= List of Pan American medalists for Brazil (before 2000) =

This is a full list of all Brazilian medalists at the Pan American Games before 2000.

== List of medalists ==
Medal	Name(s)	Games	Sport	Event	Date	Ref
Bronze	Adilton Luz	(Argentina) 1951 Buenos Aires	Athletics	Men's high jump	27 Feb 1951	
Silver	Wilson Carneiro	(Argentina) 1951 Buenos Aires	Athletics	Men's 400 m hurdles	28 Feb 1951	
Bronze	Sinibaldo Gerbasi	(Argentina) 1951 Buenos Aires	Athletics	Men's pole vault	1 Mar 1951	
Gold	Adhemar Ferreira da Silva	(Argentina) 1951 Buenos Aires	Athletics	Men's triple jump	2 Mar 1951	
Silver	Hélio da Silva	(Argentina) 1951 Buenos Aires	Athletics	Men's triple jump	2 Mar 1951	
Bronze	Nadim Marreis	(Argentina) 1951 Buenos Aires	Athletics	Men's shot put	2 Mar 1951	
Silver	Antenor da Silva	(Argentina) 1951 Buenos Aires	Wrestling	Men's freestyle light heavyweight (-87 kg)	3 Mar 1951	
Bronze	Elizabeth Müller	(Argentina) 1951 Buenos Aires	Athletics	Women's high jump	3 Mar 1951	
Silver	Vera Trezoitko	(Argentina) 1951 Buenos Aires	Athletics	Women's shot put	6 Mar 1951	
Bronze	Wanda dos Santos	(Argentina) 1951 Buenos Aires	Athletics	Women's long jump	6 Mar 1951	
Silver	Willy Otto Jordan	(Argentina) 1951 Buenos Aires	Swimming	Men's 200 m breaststroke	6 Mar 1951	
Bronze	Men's basketball team: Alberto Marson Alfredo da Motta Almir Nelson de Almeida Ardelin Pinto Hélio Marques Pereira José Luiz Azevedo Mario Jorge Fonseca Hermes Massinet Sorcinelli Paulo Rodrigues Siqueira Sebastião Gimenez Thales Monteiro Zenny de Azevedo	(Argentina) 1951 Buenos Aires	Basketball	Men's tournament	8 Mar 1951	
Silver	Paulo Sacoman	(Argentina) 1951 Buenos Aires	Boxing	Men's middleweight (-75 kg)	8 Mar 1951	
Silver	Lucio Grotone	(Argentina) 1951 Buenos Aires	Boxing	Men's light heavyweight (-81 kg)	8 Mar 1951	
Bronze	Estevão Molnar	(Argentina) 1951 Buenos Aires	Fencing	Men's sabre		
Bronze	Estevão Molnar; Frederico Taveira Serrão; Hugler Matt; Virgílio Damazio de Sá	(Argentina) 1951 Buenos Aires	Fencing	Men's sabre team		
Gold	Eric Tinoco Marques	(Argentina) 1951 Buenos Aires	Modern pentathlon	Men's individual		
Silver	Aloysio Alves Borges; Edgard Manuel Brilhante; Eduardo Lela de Medeiros; Eric Tinoco Marques	(Argentina) 1951 Buenos Aires	Modern pentathlon	Men's team		
Silver	Henrique Fusquini; Walter Karl	(Argentina) 1951 Buenos Aires	Rowing	Men's coxless pair-oared shells		
Silver	Alberto Santos; Alvaro Fonseca; Ivo Ritman; Manoel Amorim	(Argentina) 1951 Buenos Aires	Rowing	Men's coxless four-oared shells		
Silver	Jean Maligo; Geraldo Matoso	(Argentina) 1951 Buenos Aires	Sailing	Snipe class		
Gold	Roberto Bueno; Gastão Pereira Souza	(Argentina) 1951 Buenos Aires	Sailing	Star class		
Silver	Ademar Onéssimo Faller; Adhaury Rocha; Allan Sobocinski; Pedro Simão	(Argentina) 1951 Buenos Aires	Shooting	Men's 25 m rapid fire pistol team		
Silver	Antônio Snizeck; Edimar Eichemberg; Guido Albertini; Max Schrappe	(Argentina) 1951 Buenos Aires	Shooting	Men's skeet team		
Bronze	Alberto Pereira Braga; Allan Sobocinski; Antônio Martins Guimarães; Ernani Martins Neves; João Sobocinski	(Argentina) 1951 Buenos Aires	Shooting	Men's military rifle prone team		
Gold	Tetsuo Okamoto	(Argentina) 1951 Buenos Aires	Swimming	Men's 400 m freestyle		
Gold	Tetsuo Okamoto	(Argentina) 1951 Buenos Aires	Swimming	Men's 1500 m freestyle		
Silver	Aram Boghossian; João Gonçalves Filho; Ricardo Capanema; Tetsuo Okamoto	(Argentina) 1951 Buenos Aires	Swimming	Men's 4 × 200 m freestyle relay		
Bronze	Piedade Coutinho	(Argentina) 1951 Buenos Aires	Swimming	Women's 400 m freestyle		
Bronze	Ana Lucia Santa Rita; Idamis Busin; Piedade Coutinho; Talita Rodrigues	(Argentina) 1951 Buenos Aires	Swimming	Women's 4 × 100 m freestyle relay		
Bronze	Helena Stark; Silvia Villari	(Argentina) 1951 Buenos Aires	Tennis	Women's doubles		
Silver	Men's water polo team: Alfonso Zaparoli Armando Caropresco Claudino de Castro Edson Peri Guilherme Schall Isaac Moraes João Havelange Leo Rossi Luiz Antônio dos Santos Milton Busin Nelson Brescia Samuel Schemberg Saverio Gregorut	(Argentina) 1951 Buenos Aires	Water polo	Men's tournament		
Bronze	José Telles da Conceição	1955 Mexico City	Athletics	Men's high jump	13 Mar 1955	
Bronze	Ary de Sá	1955 Mexico City	Athletics	Men's long jump	14 Mar 1955	
Bronze	Wilson Carneiro	1955 Mexico City	Athletics	Men's 400 m hurdles	14 Mar 1955	
Gold	Adhemar Ferreira da Silva	1955 Mexico City	Athletics	Men's triple jump	16 Mar 1955	
Bronze	José Telles da Conceição	1955 Mexico City	Athletics	Men's 200 m	16 Mar 1955	
Bronze	Wanda dos Santos	1955 Mexico City	Athletics	Women's 80 m hurdles	17 Mar 1955	
Silver	Deyse de Castro	1955 Mexico City	Athletics	Women's high jump	17 Mar 1955	
Bronze	Men's basketball team: Wlamir Marques Amaury Pasos Almir Nelson de Almeida Mayr Facci Wilson Bombarda Edson Bispo Pedro Vicente Fonseca Leonardo Ribeiro Paraíso Moacyr Penha Ribeiro Carlos Marino Willi Pecher Zenny de Azevedo	1955 Mexico City	Basketball	Men's tournament	24 Mar 1955	
Bronze	Women's basketball team: Neuci Ramos da Silva Agláe Giorgio Nair Kanawatti Wanda Lima Bezerra Eugenia Rindeika Isaura Marli Alvares Marlene José Bento Zilah Helen Santos Maria Helena Cardoso Zilda Ulbrich Laura Rodrigues Nivea Figueiredo Silva	1955 Mexico City	Basketball	Women's tournament		
Bronze	Celestino Pinto	1955 Mexico City	Boxing	Men's light welterweight (-63,5 kg)		
Gold	Luiz Ignácio	1955 Mexico City	Boxing	Men's light heavyweight (-81 kg)		
Silver	Adão Waldemar	1955 Mexico City	Boxing	Men's heavyweight (+81 kg)		
Bronze	Ingrid Metzner	1955 Mexico City	Tennis	Women's singles		
Bronze	Ingrid Metzner; Maria Esther Bueno	1955 Mexico City	Tennis	Women's doubles		
Bronze	Men's volleyball team: Atila Gonçalves Martins Fernando Pavan Gilberto Geraldo Barcelos Jorge Almeida Belo Jorge Bittencourt José Gil Mendonça Lucio Cunha Figueiredo Mário Figueira Sobrinho Oscar Cunha Pinheiro Parker Gilbert Carvalho Reginaldo Lyra Silva Urbano Santiago	1955 Mexico City	Volleyball	Men's tournament		
Bronze	Women's volleyball team: Celma de Araújo Helena Valente Duarte Hildergarde Lassen Isaura Marli Alvares Lillian Collier Maria Imaculada Machado Maria José Barros Marlene Schenkel Norma Rosa Vaz Sônia Freire Araújo Vera Trezoitko Zilda Ulbrich	1955 Mexico City	Volleyball	Women's tournament		
Bronze	Men's water polo team: Adhemar Grijó Filho Amaury Fonseca Denir Ribeiro Edson Peri Eduardo Alijó Everaldo Cruz Hilton de Almeida Márvio dos Santos Roberto de Araújo Rodney Bell Rolf Kestener	1955 Mexico City	Water polo	Men's tournament		
Silver	Bruno Barabani	1955 Mexico City	Weightlifting	Men's middle heavyweight (-90 kg)		
Silver	Wanda dos Santos	(United States) 1959 Chicago	Athletics	Women's 80 m hurdles	31 Aug 1959	
Gold	Adhemar Ferreira da Silva	(United States) 1959 Chicago	Athletics	Men's triple jump	2 Sep 1959	
Silver	Men's football team: Françoso Dary Décio Edílson Edmar Edson Borracha Beyruth Gérson Hércules Hilton Humberto Germano Zé Maria Maranhão China Carlos Alberto Manuel Manoelzinho Nélson Ouraci Roberto Rodrigues Rubens Villadonega	(United States) 1959 Chicago	Football	Men's tournament	5 Sep 1959	
Bronze	Men's basketball team: Carlos Barone Neto Carlos Domingo Massoni Carmo de Souza Edson Bispo Fernando Pereira de Freitas Jatyr Eduardo Schall Pedro Vicente Fonseca Wlamir Marques Waldemar Blatskauskas Wilson Bombarda Waldir Geraldo Boccardo Zenny de Azevedo	(United States) 1959 Chicago	Basketball	Men's tournament		
Silver	Women's basketball team: Angelina Bizarro Genesia Isabel Cardoso Isaura Marli Alvares Maria Helena Campos Maria Helena Cardoso Marlene José Bento Marta Helga Kampmann Zilá Nepomuceno Nadir Bazani Zilda Ulbrich Nair Kanawatti Neuci Ramos da Silva	(United States) 1959 Chicago	Basketball	Women's tournament		
Silver	José Martins	(United States) 1959 Chicago	Boxing	Men's flyweight (-51 kg)		
Gold	Waldomiro Claudiano Pinto	(United States) 1959 Chicago	Boxing	Men's bantamweight (-54 kg)		
Bronze	Manuel Alves	(United States) 1959 Chicago	Boxing	Men's welterweight (-67 kg)		
Bronze	Hélio Crescêncio	(United States) 1959 Chicago	Boxing	Men's light middleweight (-71 kg)		
Gold	Abrão de Souza	(United States) 1959 Chicago	Boxing	Men's middleweight (-75 kg)		
Bronze	Jurandyr Nicolau	(United States) 1959 Chicago	Boxing	Men's heavyweight (+81 kg)		
Gold	Anésio Argenton	(United States) 1959 Chicago	Cycling	Men's 1000 m time trial (track)		
Silver	Antonio Moraes Carvalho	(United States) 1959 Chicago	Equestrian	Jumping		
Gold	Wenceslau Malta	(United States) 1959 Chicago	Modern pentathlon	Men's individual		
Silver	Breno Vignolli; José Wilson Pereira; Justo Botelho Santiago; Wenceslau Malta	(United States) 1959 Chicago	Modern pentathlon	Men's team		
Silver	Edgard Gijsen; Milton Meurer	(United States) 1959 Chicago	Rowing	Men's coxless pair-oared shells		
Bronze	Adriano Monteiro Soares; João Agostinho Almeida; João Calixto; Jorge Rodrigues; Nelson Guarda	(United States) 1959 Chicago	Rowing	Men's coxed four-oared shells		
Gold	Marcos Moraes de Barros; Reinaldo Conrad	(United States) 1959 Chicago	Sailing	Snipe class		
Gold	Antonio Barbosa; Axel Schmidt; Erik Oluf Schmidt	(United States) 1959 Chicago	Sailing	Lightning class		
Silver	Men's volleyball team: Alexandre Stubart Álvaro Caira Arlindo Lopes Corrêa Atila Gonçalves Martins Décio de Azevedo João Carlos Quaresma João Ramalho Júnior José Silvério Lage Luís Eduardo Pons Roque Midley Maron Sérgio Bóris Borges Urbano Santiago	(United States) 1959 Chicago	Volleyball	Men's tournament		
Gold	Women's volleyball team: Hildergarde Lassen Ingeborg Crause Irlana Silveira Sá Lia de Freitas Lilian Hilda Poetscher Lucia Mendes de Moraes Maria Alice Ricciardi Marina Conceição Calistre Marta Maraglia Norma Rosa Vaz Rosa Bastos O'Shea Vera Trezoitko	(United States) 1959 Chicago	Volleyball	Women's tournament		
Bronze	Men's water polo team: Adhemar Grijó Filho Everardo Cruz Flávio Ratto Hilton de Almeida João Gonçalves Filho Luiz Daniel Márvio dos Santos Paulo Bruzzi Cochrane Rodney Bell Sylvio Kelly dos Santos	(United States) 1959 Chicago	Water polo	Men's tournament		
Bronze	Iris dos Santos	(Brazil) 1963 São Paulo	Athletics	Women's javelin throw	27 Apr 1963	
Silver	Iris dos Santos	(Brazil) 1963 São Paulo	Athletics	Women's long jump	27 Apr 1963	
Silver	Sebastião Mendes	(Brazil) 1963 São Paulo	Athletics	Men's 3000 m steeplechase	30 Apr 1963	
Bronze	Roberto Chapchap	(Brazil) 1963 São Paulo	Athletics	Men's hammer throw	3 May 1963	
Silver	Men's basketball team: Amaury Pasos Antônio Salvador Sucar Carlos Domingo Massoni Carmo de Souza Celso Luiz Scarpini Edson Bispo Friedrich Wilhem Braun Luiz Cláudio Menon Ubiratan Pereira Maciel Victor Mirshauswka Wlamir Marques Waldemar Blatskauskas	(Brazil) 1963 São Paulo	Basketball	Men's tournament	3 May 1963	
Bronze	Mario Gomes	(Brazil) 1963 São Paulo	Athletics	Men's triple jump	4 May 1963	
Bronze	Walter de Almeida	(Brazil) 1963 São Paulo	Athletics	Men's javelin throw	4 May 1963	
Bronze	Wanda dos Santos	(Brazil) 1963 São Paulo	Athletics	Women's 80 m hurdles	4 May 1963	
Bronze	Edir Ribeiro; Érica da Silva; Inês Pimenta; Leontina Santos	(Brazil) 1963 São Paulo	Athletics	Women's 4 × 100 m relay	4 May 1963	
Gold	Men's football team: Adevaldo Aírton Arlindo Carlos Alberto Nene Décio Dirceu Evaldo Heitor Perroca Hélio Dias Íris Jairzinho Cardoso Zé Carlos Luiz Henrique Menotti Othon Riva Zanin Valdir	(Brazil) 1963 São Paulo	Football	Men's tournament	4 May 1963	
Bronze	Leny Filelini; Maria Helena Nascimento; Fiametta Palazo; Cecilia Ghezzi; Ana Maria Oliveira; Ignez Barros Porto; Eliana Chaves Uruguai; Ana Luisa Corrêa	(Brazil) 1963 São Paulo	Artistic swimming	Team	5 May 1963	
Silver	Women's basketball team: Angelina Bizarro Delcy Ellender Marques Diva Lucia Maretti Isaura Marli Alvares Maria Amélia Gomes Maria Helena Campos Maria Helena Cardoso Marlene José Bento Nadir Bazani Neuci Ramos da Silva Norma Pinto de Oliveira Nilza Monte Garcia	(Brazil) 1963 São Paulo	Basketball	Women's tournament		
Silver	Pedro Dias	(Brazil) 1963 São Paulo	Boxing	Men's flyweight (-51 kg)		
Gold	Rosemiro Mateus	(Brazil) 1963 São Paulo	Boxing	Men's featherweight (-57 kg)		
Silver	João da Silva	(Brazil) 1963 São Paulo	Boxing	Men's lightweight (-60 kg)		
Silver	Orlando Nunes	(Brazil) 1963 São Paulo	Boxing	Men's light welterweight (-63,5 kg)		
Silver	Rubens Alves Vasconcelos	(Brazil) 1963 São Paulo	Boxing	Men's welterweight (-67 kg)		
Gold	Elcio Neves	(Brazil) 1963 São Paulo	Boxing	Men's light middleweight (-71 kg)		
Gold	Luiz Cézar	(Brazil) 1963 São Paulo	Boxing	Men's middleweight (-75 kg)		
Bronze	Rubens Oliveira	(Brazil) 1963 São Paulo	Boxing	Men's light heavyweight (-81 kg)		
Silver	José Edson Jorge	(Brazil) 1963 São Paulo	Boxing	Men's heavyweight (+81 kg)		
Bronze	Anésio Argenton	(Brazil) 1963 São Paulo	Cycling	Men's 1000 m time trial (track)		
Silver	Aloysio Alves Borges; Arthur Cramer; Carlos Luiz Couto; José Maria Pereira	(Brazil) 1963 São Paulo	Fencing	Men's épée team		
Silver	Jorge Yamashita	(Brazil) 1963 São Paulo	Judo	Men's lightweight (-70 kg)		(Note: This medal is missing in some counts.)
Gold	Lhofei Shiozawa	(Brazil) 1963 São Paulo	Judo	Men's middleweight (-80 kg)		
Silver	Milton Lovato	(Brazil) 1963 São Paulo	Judo	Men's heavyweight (-93 kg)		
Silver	Georges Mehdi	(Brazil) 1963 São Paulo	Judo	Men's open class		
Silver	José Wilson Pereira; Justo Botelho Santiago; Nilo Jaime da Silva	(Brazil) 1963 São Paulo	Modern pentathlon	Men's team		
Silver	Ivan Pital	(Brazil) 1963 São Paulo	Rowing	Men's single sculls		
Bronze	Edgard Gijsen; Francisco Todesco	(Brazil) 1963 São Paulo	Rowing	Men's double sculls		
Bronze	Adriano Monteiro Soares; Antemídio Julião; Audifax Barbosa	(Brazil) 1963 São Paulo	Rowing	Men's coxed pair-oared shells		
Silver	Alberto Blemer; Antemídio Julião; Assis Garcia Ramos; Audifax Barbosa; Sylvio de Souza	(Brazil) 1963 São Paulo	Rowing	Men's coxed four-oared shells		
Silver	Fritz Müller; Harri Klein; Jorge Rodrigues; Roberto Knirien	(Brazil) 1963 São Paulo	Rowing	Men's coxless four-oared shells		
Silver	Ado Steiner; Edson Schmidt; Erich Passig; Ernestro Vahl Filho; Jobel Furtado; Manuel Silveira; Rui Souza Lopes; Teodoro Rogério Vahl; Walfredo Santos	(Brazil) 1963 São Paulo	Rowing	Men's eight-oared shells		
Gold	Hans Helmuth Domscke	(Brazil) 1963 São Paulo	Sailing	Finn class		
Bronze	Harry Adler; Luiz Peixoto Ramos	(Brazil) 1963 São Paulo	Sailing	Star class		
Silver	Axel Schmidt; Erik Oluf Schmidt; Robinson Hasselmann	(Brazil) 1963 São Paulo	Sailing	Lightning class		
Gold	Joaquim Roderbourg; Klaus Hendriksen	(Brazil) 1963 São Paulo	Sailing	Flying Dutchman		
Gold	Ralph Conrad; Reinaldo Conrad	(Brazil) 1963 São Paulo	Sailing	Snipe class		
Bronze	Álvaro dos Santos Filho; Benevenuto Tilli; Durval Guimarães; Francisco Estrella	(Brazil) 1963 São Paulo	Shooting	Men's 50 m pistol team		
Bronze	Álvaro Altmann; Amílcar Caldeira; Edmar de Salles; Milton Sobocinski	(Brazil) 1963 São Paulo	Shooting	Men's 50 m high power rifle three positions team		
Bronze	Athos de Oliveira	(Brazil) 1963 São Paulo	Swimming	Men's 100 m backstroke		
Bronze	Athos de Oliveira; Antonio Renzo Filho; Antonio Celso Guimarães; Peter Wolfgang Metzner	(Brazil) 1963 São Paulo	Swimming	Men's 4 × 200 m freestyle relay		
Bronze	Eliana Souza Motta; Maria Lourdes Teixeira; Angela Maria Palioli; Vera Maria Formiga	(Brazil) 1963 São Paulo	Swimming	Women's 4 × 100 m freestyle relay		
Gold	Ronald Barnes	(Brazil) 1963 São Paulo	Tennis	Men's singles		
Gold	Carlos Fernandes; Ronald Barnes	(Brazil) 1963 São Paulo	Tennis	Men's doubles		
Bronze	Iarte Adam; Thomaz Koch	(Brazil) 1963 São Paulo	Tennis	Men's doubles		
Gold	Maria Esther Bueno	(Brazil) 1963 São Paulo	Tennis	Women's singles		
Silver	Maria Esther Bueno; Maureen Schwartz	(Brazil) 1963 São Paulo	Tennis	Women's doubles		
Silver	Maria Esther Bueno; Thomaz Koch	(Brazil) 1963 São Paulo	Tennis	Mixed doubles		
Gold	Men's volleyball team: Carlos Albano Feitosa Décio de Azevedo Fábio Starling Carvalho Giuseppe Mezzalma João Cláudio França Josias Ramalho Luiz Roberto Moraes Marco Antônio Volpi Emanuel Newdon Pedro Barbosa de Andrade Roque Midley Maron Victor Barcellos Borges	(Brazil) 1963 São Paulo	Volleyball	Men's tournament		
Gold	Women's volleyball team: Corina Lasperg Elda Pimenta Eunice Rondino Joana Silva Leila Peixoto Lia de Freitas Marina Conceição Calistre Marlene Dunishian Norma Rosa Vaz Tânia Fagundes Vera Trezoitko Zilda Ulbrich	(Brazil) 1963 São Paulo	Volleyball	Women's tournament		
Gold	Men's water polo team: Adhemar Grijó Filho Aladar Szabo Flávio Ratto Ivo Carotini João Gonçalves Filho Luís Carlos Valim Luiz Daniel Luiz Eduardo Lima Márvio dos Santos Paulo Carotini	(Brazil) 1963 São Paulo	Water polo	Men's tournament		
Bronze	Aída dos Santos	(Canada) 1967 Winnipeg	Athletics	Women's pentathlon	30 Jul 1967	
Silver	Nelson Prudêncio	(Canada) 1967 Winnipeg	Athletics	Men's triple jump	1 Aug 1967	
Gold	Women's basketball team: Angelina Bizarro Delcy Ellender Marques Elza Pacheco Jacy Azevedo Laís Silva Lucia Maria Borges Marlene José Bento Nadir Bazani Neusa Camargo Nilza Monte Garcia Norma Pinto de Oliveira Rosália Vasconcelos	(Canada) 1967 Winnipeg	Basketball	Women's tournament		
Silver	Luiz Fabre	(Canada) 1967 Winnipeg	Boxing	Men's middleweight (-75 kg)		
Silver	Nelson Pessoa	(Canada) 1967 Winnipeg	Equestrian	Jumping		
Gold	Antônio Simões; José Fernandez; Nelson Pessoa; Reny Ferreira	(Canada) 1967 Winnipeg	Equestrian	Jumping team		
Gold	Arthur Cramer	(Canada) 1967 Winnipeg	Fencing	Men's épée		
Silver	Arthur Cramer; Carlos Luiz Couto; Darío Amaral; José Maria Pereira	(Canada) 1967 Winnipeg	Fencing	Men's épée team		
Gold	Akira Ono	(Canada) 1967 Winnipeg	Judo	Men's half lightweight (-63 kg)		
Gold	Takeshi Miura	(Canada) 1967 Winnipeg	Judo	Men's lightweight (-70 kg)		
Silver	Lhofei Shiozawa	(Canada) 1967 Winnipeg	Judo	Men's middleweight (-80 kg)		
Bronze	Georges Mehdi	(Canada) 1967 Winnipeg	Judo	Men's open class		
Bronze	Cláudio Angeli; José Carlos Angeli; Sylvio de Souza	(Canada) 1967 Winnipeg	Rowing	Men's coxed pair-oared shells		
Gold	Jörg Bruder	(Canada) 1967 Winnipeg	Sailing	Finn class		
Silver	Burkhard Cordes; Reinaldo Conrad	(Canada) 1967 Winnipeg	Sailing	Flying Dutchman		
Gold	Carlos Henrique de Lorenzi; Nelson Piccolo	(Canada) 1967 Winnipeg	Sailing	Snipe class		
Silver	Fernão Dias Paes Leme; Mário Borges Jr. Renato Augo da Matta	(Canada) 1967 Winnipeg	Sailing	Lightning class		
Gold	José Sylvio Fiolo	(Canada) 1967 Winnipeg	Swimming	Men's 200 m breaststroke	29 Jul 1967	
Gold	José Sylvio Fiolo	(Canada) 1967 Winnipeg	Swimming	Men's 100 m breaststroke	30 Jul 1967	
Bronze	Ilson Asturiano; João Costa Lima Neto; José Sylvio Fiolo; Waldyr Ramos	(Canada) 1967 Winnipeg	Swimming	Men's 4 × 100 m medley relay		
Gold	Thomaz Koch	(Canada) 1967 Winnipeg	Tennis	Men's singles		
Gold	José Edison Mandarino; Thomaz Koch	(Canada) 1967 Winnipeg	Tennis	Men's doubles		
Silver	Men's volleyball team: Antônio Carlos Moreno Arnaldo Jagle Carlos Albano Feitosa Décio de Azevedo Fernando Blaser Gerson Schuch Marco Antônio Volpi Mário Dunlop Mário Mariz Paulo Sevciuc Sérgio Pires Sobrinho Victor Barcellos Borges	(Canada) 1967 Winnipeg	Volleyball	Men's tournament		
Silver	Men's water polo team: Arnaldo Marsili Cláudio Lima Henrique Filellini Ivo Carotini João Gonçalves Filho Luiz Eduardo Lima Marcos Vargas da Costa Paulo Carotini Pedro Pinciroli Jr. Rodney Bell	(Canada) 1967 Winnipeg	Water polo	Men's tournament		
Silver	Koji Michi	(Canada) 1967 Winnipeg	Weightlifting	Men's middleweight (-75 kg)		
Bronze	Luiz de Almeida	(Canada) 1967 Winnipeg	Weightlifting	Men's middleweight (-75 kg)		
Silver	Silvina Pereira	(Colombia) 1971 Cali	Athletics	Women's long jump	1 Aug 1971	
Bronze	Aída dos Santos	(Colombia) 1971 Cali	Athletics	Women's pentathlon	5 Aug 1971	
Silver	Nelson Prudêncio	(Colombia) 1971 Cali	Athletics	Men's triple jump	5 Aug 1971	
Gold	Men's basketball team: Adilson Nascimento Carlos Domingo Massoni Emil Assad Rached Francisco Sérgio García Hélio Rubens José Aparecido Luiz Cláudio Menon Luiz Martins de Mello Marcos Leite Milton Setrini Roberto José Corrêa Washington Joseph	(Colombia) 1971 Cali	Basketball	Men's tournament	12 Aug 1971	
Gold	Women's basketball team: Benedita Castro Delcy Ellender Marques Elza Pacheco Jacy Azevedo Laís Silva Maria Helena Campos Maria Helena Cardoso Marlene José Bento Nadir Bazani Nilza Monte Garcia Norma Pinto de Oliveira Odila Camargo	(Colombia) 1971 Cali	Basketball	Women's tournament		
Silver	Waldemar de Oliveira	(Colombia) 1971 Cali	Boxing	Men's light heavyweight (-81 kg)		
Bronze	Vicente de Campo	(Colombia) 1971 Cali	Boxing	Men's heavyweight (+81 kg)		
Silver	Luis Carlos Flores	(Colombia) 1971 Cali	Cycling	Men's race individual (road)		
Silver	Arthur Cramer; Darío Amaral; José Maria Pereira; Marcos Borges	(Colombia) 1971 Cali	Fencing	Men's épée team		
Gold	Edgard Gijsen; Harri Klein	(Colombia) 1971 Cali	Rowing	Men's double sculls		
Gold	Atalibio Magioni; Celenio Martins Silva; Manuel Tereso Novo	(Colombia) 1971 Cali	Rowing	Men's coxed pair-oared shells		
Silver	Milton Teixeira; Wandir Kuntze	(Colombia) 1971 Cali	Rowing	Men's coxless pair-oared shells		
Gold	Érico de Souza; Miguel Bancov; Milton Teixeira; Wandir Kuntze	(Colombia) 1971 Cali	Rowing	Men's coxless four-oared shells		
Gold	Jörg Bruder	(Colombia) 1971 Cali	Sailing	Finn class		
Gold	João Pedro Reinhard; Ralph Christian	(Colombia) 1971 Cali	Sailing	Snipe class		
Gold	Manfred Shaaffhausen; Mario Buckup; Peter Ficker	(Colombia) 1971 Cali	Sailing	Lightning class		
Gold	Bertino Alves de Souza	(Colombia) 1971 Cali	Shooting	Men's 50 m pistol		
Silver	José Aranha	(Colombia) 1971 Cali	Swimming	Men's 100 m freestyle	11 Aug 1971	
Bronze	José Sylvio Fiolo	(Colombia) 1971 Cali	Swimming	Men's 100 m breaststroke	6 Aug 1971	
Bronze	Flávio Dutra Machado; José Aranha; Paulo Zanetti; Ruy de Oliveira	(Colombia) 1971 Cali	Swimming	Men's 4 × 100 m freestyle relay	7 Aug 1971	
Bronze	Alfredo Machado; Flávio Dutra Machado; José Aranha; Ruy de Oliveira	(Colombia) 1971 Cali	Swimming	Men's 4 × 200 m freestyle relay	9 Aug 1971	
Bronze	César Lourenço; Flávio Dutra Machado; José Aranha; José Sylvio Fiolo	(Colombia) 1971 Cali	Swimming	Men's 4 × 100 m medley relay	11 Aug 1971	
Bronze	Lucy Burle	(Colombia) 1971 Cali	Swimming	Women's 100 m butterfly	8 Aug 1971	
Bronze	Lucila Martins; Lucy Burle; Maria Hungerbuler; Rosemary Ribeiro	(Colombia) 1971 Cali	Swimming	Women's 4 × 100 m freestyle relay	10 Aug 1971	
Bronze	Men's volleyball team: Aderval Arvani Alexandre Abeid Antônio Carlos Moreno Décio Cattaruzzi Jorge Delano Hélio de Oliveira João Jens Jorge Américo de Souza Lino de Melo Gama Luiz Zech Mário Procopio Bebeto de Freitas	(Colombia) 1971 Cali	Volleyball	Men's tournament		
Bronze	Luiz de Almeida	(Colombia) 1971 Cali	Weightlifting	Men's light heavyweight (-82,5 kg) – clean and jerk		
Bronze	Thamer Chaim	(Colombia) 1971 Cali	Weightlifting	Men's heavyweight (-110 kg) – press		
Bronze	Thamer Chaim	(Colombia) 1971 Cali	Weightlifting	Men's heavyweight (-110 kg) – snatch		
Bronze	Thamer Chaim	(Colombia) 1971 Cali	Weightlifting	Men's heavyweight (-110 kg) – clean and jerk		
Bronze	Thamer Chaim	(Colombia) 1971 Cali	Weightlifting	Men's heavyweight (-110 kg) – total		
Bronze	Silvina Pereira	1975 Mexico City	Athletics	Women's 200 m	15 Oct 1975	
Bronze	Delmo da Silva	1975 Mexico City	Athletics	Men's 400 m	18 Oct 1975	
Silver	José Romão da Silva	1975 Mexico City	Athletics	Men's 3000 m steeplechase	14 Oct 1975	
Gold	João Carlos de Oliveira	1975 Mexico City	Athletics	Men's long jump	13 Oct 1975	
Gold	João Carlos de Oliveira	1975 Mexico City	Athletics	Men's triple jump	15 Oct 1975	
Bronze	Men's basketball team: Adilson Nascimento Fausto Gianecchini Gilson Trindade de Jesus José Geraldo Hélio Rubens Marcel de Souza Marcos Leite Milton Setrini Paulo César Esteves Roberto José Corrêa Sérgio Toledo Machado Ubiratan Pereira Maciel	1975 Mexico City	Basketball	Men's tournament		
Silver	Fernando José Martins	1975 Mexico City	Boxing	Men's middleweight (-75 kg)		
Bronze	João Batista Rodrigues	1975 Mexico City	Boxing	Men's light heavyweight (-81 kg)		
Bronze	Jair de Campos	1975 Mexico City	Boxing	Men's heavyweight (+81 kg)		
Bronze	Diana Paes Leme; Gerson Borges; Ingrid Trokyo	1975 Mexico City	Equestrian	Dressage team		
Bronze	Arthur Cramer; Francisco Buonafina; Frederico Alencar; Ronaldo Schwantes	1975 Mexico City	Fencing	Men's épée team		
Gold	Men's football team: Alberto Leguelé Bianque Carlos Carlinhos Cláudio Adão Eudes Edinho Erivelto Chico Fraga Cassano Batista Santos Luiz Alberto Marcelo Oliveira Mauro Cabeção Pitta Tiquinho Rosemiro Tecão Zé Carlos	1975 Mexico City	Football	Men's tournament	25 Oct 1975	
Bronze	Luis Shinohara	1975 Mexico City	Judo	Men's half lightweight (-63 kg)		
Silver	Roberto Machusso	1975 Mexico City	Judo	Men's lightweight (-70 kg)		
Silver	Carlos Motta	1975 Mexico City	Judo	Men's middleweight (-80 kg)		
Gold	Ricardo Campos	1975 Mexico City	Judo	Men's half heavyweight (-93 kg)		
Bronze	Fenelon da Silva	1975 Mexico City	Judo	Men's heavyweight (+93 kg)		
Gold	Gilberto Gerhardt; Mario Castro Filho	1975 Mexico City	Rowing	Men's double sculls		
Bronze	Antonio Augo Pistoia; Edilson Cunha Bezerra; Francisco Penedo Tambasco	1975 Mexico City	Rowing	Men's coxed pair-oared shells		
Gold	Érico de Souza; Raul Bagattini	1975 Mexico City	Rowing	Men's coxless pair-oared shells		
Silver	Cláudio Biekarck	1975 Mexico City	Sailing	Finn class		
Gold	Burkhard Cordes; Reinaldo Conrad	1975 Mexico City	Sailing	Flying Dutchman		
Silver	Gregório Pontes; Luiz André Reis	1975 Mexico City	Sailing	Snipe class		
Silver	Durval Guimarães	1975 Mexico City	Shooting	Men's 50 m rifle prone		
Bronze	Durval Guimarães; Edmar de Salles; Milton Sobocinski; Waldemar Capucci	1975 Mexico City	Shooting	Men's 50 m rifle prone team		
Gold	Athos Pisoni	1975 Mexico City	Shooting	Men's skeet		
Silver	Athos Pisoni; José Pedro Costa; Romeu Luchiari Filho; Sérgio Cunha Bastos	1975 Mexico City	Shooting	Men's skeet team		
Bronze	Athos Pisoni; Francisco Alavaugarte; Marcos José Olsen; Mario Morganti	1975 Mexico City	Shooting	Men's trap team		
Bronze	Djan Madruga	1975 Mexico City	Swimming	Men's 400 m freestyle	21 Oct 1975	
Bronze	Djan Madruga	1975 Mexico City	Swimming	Men's 1500 m freestyle	23 Oct 1975	
Bronze	Rômulo Arantes	1975 Mexico City	Swimming	Men's 100 m backstroke	19 Oct 1975	
Bronze	José Sylvio Fiolo	1975 Mexico City	Swimming	Men's 100 m breaststroke	19 Oct 1975	
Bronze	Djan Madruga; José Namorado; Paul Jouanneau; Rômulo Arantes	1975 Mexico City	Swimming	Men's 4 × 200 m freestyle relay	22 Oct 1975	
Bronze	Akcel de Godoy; José Namorado; José Sylvio Fiolo; Rômulo Arantes	1975 Mexico City	Swimming	Men's 4 × 100 m medley relay	24 Oct 1975	
Bronze	Rosemary Ribeiro	1975 Mexico City	Swimming	Women's 200 m butterfly	23 Oct 1975	
Bronze	Christiane Paquelet; Lucy Burle; Maria Guimarães; Rosemary Ribeiro	1975 Mexico City	Swimming	Women's 4 × 100 m freestyle relay	22 Oct 1975	
Bronze	Christiane Paquelet; Cristina Teixeira; Flávia Nadalutti; Lucy Burle	1975 Mexico City	Swimming	Women's 4 × 100 m medley relay	19 Oct 1975	
Bronze	José Schmidt Filho; João Soares Jr.	1975 Mexico City	Tennis	Men's doubles		
Silver	Patricia Medrado	1975 Mexico City	Tennis	Women's singles		
Silver	Maria Christina Andrade; Wanda Ferraz	1975 Mexico City	Tennis	Women's doubles		
Silver	Men's volleyball team: Alexandre Kalache Antônio Carlos Moreno Bernard Rajzman Elói de Oliveira Fernando Ávila Jean Luc Rosat José Marcelino Mauro Henrique Fialho Bebeto de Freitas Paulo Peterle Sérgio Danilas William Silva	1975 Mexico City	Volleyball	Men's tournament		
Silver	Paulo de Sene	1975 Mexico City	Weightlifting	Men's bantamweight (-56 kg) – snatch		
Silver	Paulo de Sene	1975 Mexico City	Weightlifting	Men's bantamweight (-56 kg) – clean and jerk		
Bronze	Eduardo Soares de Souza	1975 Mexico City	Weightlifting	Men's super heavyweight (+110 kg) – snatch		
Bronze	Arci Zélia Kempner; Cláudia Vasques; Daisy Schmidt	(Puerto Rico) 1979 San Juan	Archery	Women's team		
Silver	Antônio Ferreira	(Puerto Rico) 1979 San Juan	Athletics	Men's 400 m hurdles		
Bronze	Agberto Guimarães	(Puerto Rico) 1979 San Juan	Athletics	Men's 800 m	9 Jul 1979	
Bronze	Agberto Guimarães	(Puerto Rico) 1979 San Juan	Athletics	Men's 1500 m		
Bronze	Altevir de Araújo; Milton de Castro; Nelson dos Santos; Rui da Silva	(Puerto Rico) 1979 San Juan	Athletics	Men's 4 × 100 m relay		
Gold	João Carlos de Oliveira	(Puerto Rico) 1979 San Juan	Athletics	Men's long jump	7 Jul 1979	
Gold	João Carlos de Oliveira	(Puerto Rico) 1979 San Juan	Athletics	Men's triple jump	9 Jul 1979	
Bronze	Men's basketball team: Adilson Nascimento Fausto Gianecchini Evaristo Soares José Carlos Saiani José Geraldo Hélio Rubens Marcel de Souza Marcelo Vido Marcos Leite Milton Setrini Oscar Schmidt Ubiratan Pereira Maciel	(Puerto Rico) 1979 San Juan	Basketball	Men's tournament		
Bronze	Francisco de Jesus	(Puerto Rico) 1979 San Juan	Boxing	Men's light middleweight (-71 kg)		
Silver	Carlos Antunes da Fonseca	(Puerto Rico) 1979 San Juan	Boxing	Men's middleweight (-75 kg)		
Gold	Men's football team: Solitinho Cléo Cristóvão Mica Edson Boaro Gilcimar Jackson Jérson João Luiz Silva Luís Cláudio Luís Henrique Oswaldo Rogério Silvinho Valdoir Vítor Wagner Basílio	(Puerto Rico) 1979 San Juan	Football	Men's tournament	14 Jul 1979	
Bronze	Gilmarcio Antunes Sanches; Hélio Araújo; João Francisco Levy; João Luiz Ribeiro; Luiz Tadeu Braga; Reinaldo Calinsque	(Puerto Rico) 1979 San Juan	Gymnastics	Artistic gymnastics men's all-around team		
Gold	Luis Shinohara	(Puerto Rico) 1979 San Juan	Judo	Men's extra lightweight (-60 kg)		
Silver	Luís Onmura	(Puerto Rico) 1979 San Juan	Judo	Men's half lightweight (-65 kg)		
Bronze	Roberto Machusso	(Puerto Rico) 1979 San Juan	Judo	Men's lightweight (-71 kg)		
Gold	Carlos Alberto Cunha	(Puerto Rico) 1979 San Juan	Judo	Men's half middleweight (-78 kg)		
Gold	Carlos Pacheco	(Puerto Rico) 1979 San Juan	Judo	Men's half heavyweight (-95 kg)		
Bronze	Oswaldo Simões Filho	(Puerto Rico) 1979 San Juan	Judo	Men's heavyweight (+95 kg)		
Gold	Oswaldo Simões Filho	(Puerto Rico) 1979 San Juan	Judo	Men's open class		
Silver	Men's roller hockey team: Antônio Requena José Ricardo Frei Haroldo Requena Mário Alcoforado Maurício Duque Moacir Neuenschwander Paulo Peres Silvio Angerami	(Puerto Rico) 1979 San Juan	Roller sports	Roller hockey		
Silver	Gilberto Gerhardt; José Cláudio Lazzarotto; Paulo Dworakowski; Waldemar Trombetta	(Puerto Rico) 1979 San Juan	Rowing	Men's quadruple sculls		
Gold	Laildo Machado; Manuel Tereso Novo; Wandir Kuntze	(Puerto Rico) 1979 San Juan	Rowing	Men's coxed pair-oared shells		
Bronze	Edson Menezes; Henrique Johann; Oscar Sommer; Raúl Bagattini	(Puerto Rico) 1979 San Juan	Rowing	Men's coxless four-oared shells		
Bronze	Boris Osterbren; Ernestro Neugebauer	(Puerto Rico) 1979 San Juan	Sailing	Snipe class		
Gold	Joaquim Feneberg; Mario Buckup; Ralph Christian	(Puerto Rico) 1979 San Juan	Sailing	Lightning class		
Silver	Eduardo Souza Ramos; Manfredo Kaufmann Jr. Thomas Heimann	(Puerto Rico) 1979 San Juan	Sailing	Soling class		
Silver	Bertino Alves de Souza; Paulo Lamego; Sylvio Carvalho; Wilson Scheidemantel	(Puerto Rico) 1979 San Juan	Shooting	Men's 50 m pistol team		
Bronze	Dilson Reis; Durval Guimarães; Milton Sobocinski; Waldemar Capucci	(Puerto Rico) 1979 San Juan	Shooting	Men's 50 m rifle prone team		
Silver	Flávio Bonet; Francisco Alavaugarte; Marcos José Olsen; Paulo Monteiro Assis	(Puerto Rico) 1979 San Juan	Shooting	Men's trap team		
Silver	Rômulo Arantes	(Puerto Rico) 1979 San Juan	Swimming	Men's 100 m backstroke	2 Jul 1979	
Bronze	Djan Madruga	(Puerto Rico) 1979 San Juan	Swimming	Men's 200 m backstroke	5 Jul 1979	
Bronze	Djan Madruga	(Puerto Rico) 1979 San Juan	Swimming	Men's 200 m freestyle	2 Jul 1979	
Silver	Djan Madruga	(Puerto Rico) 1979 San Juan	Swimming	Men's 400 m freestyle	5 Jul 1979	
Silver	Djan Madruga	(Puerto Rico) 1979 San Juan	Swimming	Men's 1500 m freestyle	7 Jul 1979	
Bronze	Cyro Delgado; Djan Madruga; Marcus Mattioli; Rômulo Arantes	(Puerto Rico) 1979 San Juan	Swimming	Men's 4 × 100 m freestyle relay	3 Jul 1979	
Silver	Cyro Delgado; Djan Madruga; Jorge Fernandes; Marcus Mattioli	(Puerto Rico) 1979 San Juan	Swimming	Men's 4 × 200 m freestyle relay	6 Jul 1979	
Silver	Men's volleyball team: Aloisio Alves Antônio Carlos Moreno Antônio Carlos Ribeiro Bernard Rajzman Deraldo Wanderley Helder Zech João Alves Grangeiro Neto José Montanaro Jr. Mario Xandó Netto Mauro Henrique Fialho Renan Dal Zotto William Silva	(Puerto Rico) 1979 San Juan	Volleyball	Men's tournament		
Bronze	Women's volleyball team: Célia Garritano Denise Porto Eliana Aleixo Fernanda Emerick Heloísa Roese Ivonete das Neves Jackie Silva Lenice Oliveira Dora Castanheira Isabel Salgado Mônica da Silva Rita Teixeira	(Puerto Rico) 1979 San Juan	Volleyball	Women's tournament		
Bronze	Nelson Dias de Carvalho	(Puerto Rico) 1979 San Juan	Weightlifting	Men's middle heavyweight (-90 kg)		
Bronze	Renato Emilio	(Venezuela) 1983 Caracas	Archery	Men's individual		
Bronze	Renato Emilio	(Venezuela) 1983 Caracas	Archery	Men's recurve 70 m		
Bronze	Ana Beatriz Miranda; Cláudia Vasques; Martha Emilio	(Venezuela) 1983 Caracas	Archery	Women's team		
Bronze	Gérson de Souza	(Venezuela) 1983 Caracas	Athletics	Men's 400 m	27 Aug 1983	
Silver	Antônio Ferreira	(Venezuela) 1983 Caracas	Athletics	Men's 400 m hurdles	24 Aug 1983	
Gold	Agberto Guimarães	(Venezuela) 1983 Caracas	Athletics	Men's 800 m	24 Aug 1983	
Silver	José Luíz Barbosa	(Venezuela) 1983 Caracas	Athletics	Men's 800 m	24 Aug 1983	
Gold	Agberto Guimarães	(Venezuela) 1983 Caracas	Athletics	Men's 1500 m	26 Aug 1983	
Bronze	Tom Hintnaus	(Venezuela) 1983 Caracas	Athletics	Men's pole vault	26 Aug 1983	
Bronze	Gérson de Souza; João Batista da Silva; Nelson dos Santos; Robson Caetano	(Venezuela) 1983 Caracas	Athletics	Men's 4 × 100 m relay	28 Aug 1983	
Silver	Agberto Guimarães; Evaldo da Silva; Gérson de Souza; José Luíz Barbosa	(Venezuela) 1983 Caracas	Athletics	Men's 4 × 400 m relay	28 Aug 1983	
Gold	Esmeralda Garcia	(Venezuela) 1983 Caracas	Athletics	Women's 100 m	24 Aug 1983	
Gold	Conceição Geremias	(Venezuela) 1983 Caracas	Athletics	Women's heptathlon	25 Aug 1983	
Silver	Men's basketball team: Adilson Nascimento Fausto Gianecchini Gerson Victalino Israel Andrade Jorge Guerra Marcel de Souza Marcelo Vido Marcos Leite Milton Setrini Nilo Guimarães Ricardo Guimarães Sílvio Malvezi	(Venezuela) 1983 Caracas	Basketball	Men's tournament		
Bronze	Women's basketball team: Anne Krabenborg Dayse Mendes Elisa Garcia Hortência Marcari Maria Angélica Maria Paula Silva Marta Sobral Solange Castro Soraya Brandão Suzete Pereira Vanda dal Col Vânia Somaio Teixeira	(Venezuela) 1983 Caracas	Basketball	Women's tournament		
Bronze	Manoelito Santos	(Venezuela) 1983 Caracas	Boxing	Men's light flyweight (-48 kg)		
Bronze	Antonio Madureira	(Venezuela) 1983 Caracas	Boxing	Men's welterweight (-67 kg)		
Bronze	Antonio Carlos Hunger; Fernando Louro; Hans Fischer; Mauro Ribeiro	(Venezuela) 1983 Caracas	Cycling	Men's 4000 m pursuit team (track)		
Bronze	Orlando Facada	(Venezuela) 1983 Caracas	Equestrian	Dressage		
Bronze	José Scheleder Filho; Lica Diniz; Orlando Facada	(Venezuela) 1983 Caracas	Equestrian	Dressage team		
Silver	Men's football team: Adalberto Dunga Boni Edson Souza Everaldo Heitor Hugo Jorginho Guto Neto Marcus Vinícius Mauricinho Paulo César Paulo Sérgio Paulinho Helinho João Brigatti Waldir Marquinhos	(Venezuela) 1983 Caracas	Football	Men's tournament	23 Aug 1983	
Bronze	Altair Prado; Claudia Magalhães; Denize Campos; Jaqueline Pires; Marian Fernandes; Tatiana Figueiredo	(Venezuela) 1983 Caracas	Gymnastics	Artistic gymnastics women's all-around team		
Silver	Luis Shinohara	(Venezuela) 1983 Caracas	Judo	Men's extra lightweight (-60 kg)		
Bronze	Sérgio Sano	(Venezuela) 1983 Caracas	Judo	Men's half lightweight (-65 kg)		
Silver	Luís Onmura	(Venezuela) 1983 Caracas	Judo	Men's lightweight (-71 kg)		
Bronze	Walter Carmona	(Venezuela) 1983 Caracas	Judo	Men's middleweight (-86 kg)		
Silver	Aurélio Miguel	(Venezuela) 1983 Caracas	Judo	Men's half heavyweight (-95 kg)		
Silver	Frederico Flexa	(Venezuela) 1983 Caracas	Judo	Men's heavyweight (+95 kg)		
Silver	Inêz Nazareth	(Venezuela) 1983 Caracas	Judo	Women's extra lightweight (-48 kg)		
Bronze	Solange Almeida	(Venezuela) 1983 Caracas	Judo	Women's half lightweight (-52 kg)		
Bronze	Tânia Ishii	(Venezuela) 1983 Caracas	Judo	Women's lightweight (-56 kg)		
Bronze	Carla Duarte	(Venezuela) 1983 Caracas	Judo	Women's half middleweight (-61 kg)		
Bronze	Soraia André	(Venezuela) 1983 Caracas	Judo	Women's heavyweight (+72 kg)		
Gold	Ricardo de Carvalho; Ronaldo de Carvalho	(Venezuela) 1983 Caracas	Rowing	Men's coxless pair-oared shells		
Silver	Dênis Marinho; José Raimundo Ribeiro; Mauro Weber; Nilton Alonso; Walter Soares	(Venezuela) 1983 Caracas	Rowing	Men's coxed four-oared shells		
Gold	Pedro Bulhões	(Venezuela) 1983 Caracas	Sailing	Men's Laser class		
Gold	José Luiz Ribeiro; Paulo Roberto Ribeiro	(Venezuela) 1983 Caracas	Sailing	Men's 470 class		
Silver	Peter Ficker; Werner Sonksen	(Venezuela) 1983 Caracas	Sailing	Star class		
Gold	Cláudio Biekarck; Gunnar Ficker; Ralph Berger	(Venezuela) 1983 Caracas	Sailing	Lightning class		
Gold	Daniel Adler; Ronaldo Senfft; Torben Grael	(Venezuela) 1983 Caracas	Sailing	Soling class		
Bronze	Delival Nobre	(Venezuela) 1983 Caracas	Shooting	Men's 25 m standard pistol		
Silver	Sylvio Carvalho	(Venezuela) 1983 Caracas	Shooting	Men's 50 m pistol		
Bronze	Durval Guimarães; Sylvio Carvalho; Wilson Scheidemantel	(Venezuela) 1983 Caracas	Shooting	Men's 50 m pistol team		
Silver	Marcos José Olsen	(Venezuela) 1983 Caracas	Shooting	Men's trap		
Silver	Ricardo Prado	(Venezuela) 1983 Caracas	Swimming	Men's 200 m backstroke	19 Aug 1983	
Silver	Ricardo Prado	(Venezuela) 1983 Caracas	Swimming	Men's 200 m butterfly	21 Aug 1983	
Gold	Ricardo Prado	(Venezuela) 1983 Caracas	Swimming	Men's 200 m medley	22 Aug 1983	
Bronze	Marcelo Jucá	(Venezuela) 1983 Caracas	Swimming	Men's 400 m freestyle	20 Aug 1983	
Gold	Ricardo Prado	(Venezuela) 1983 Caracas	Swimming	Men's 400 m medley	18 Aug 1983	
Silver	Marcelo Jucá	(Venezuela) 1983 Caracas	Swimming	Men's 1500 m freestyle	22 Aug 1983	
Silver	Cyro Delgado; Djan Madruga; Jorge Fernandes; Ronald Menezes	(Venezuela) 1983 Caracas	Swimming	Men's 4 × 100 m freestyle relay	20 Aug 1983	
Silver	Cyro Delgado; Djan Madruga; Jorge Fernandes; Marcelo Jucá	(Venezuela) 1983 Caracas	Swimming	Men's 4 × 200 m freestyle relay	18 Aug 1983	
Silver	Ricardo Inokuchi	(Venezuela) 1983 Caracas	Table tennis	Men's singles		
Gold	Cláudio Kano; Ricardo Inokuchi	(Venezuela) 1983 Caracas	Table tennis	Men's doubles		
Bronze	Cláudio Kano; Sandra Noda	(Venezuela) 1983 Caracas	Table tennis	Mixed doubles		
Gold	Acassio da Cunha; Aristides Nascimento; Cláudio Kano; Maurício Kobayashi; Ricardo Inokuchi	(Venezuela) 1983 Caracas	Table tennis	Men's team		
Gold	Men's volleyball team: Amauri Ribeiro Antônio Carlos Ribeiro Bernard Rajzman Bernardo Rezende Domingos Maracanã Fernando Ávila Marcus Vinícius Freire Mario Xandó Netto Renan Dal Zotto Ronaldo de Macedo Rui Nascimento William Silva	(Venezuela) 1983 Caracas	Volleyball	Men's tournament	27 Aug 1983	
Silver	Robson Caetano	(United States) 1987 Indianapolis	Athletics	Men's 200 m	15 Aug 1987	
Silver	José Luiz Barbosa	(United States) 1987 Indianapolis	Athletics	Men's 800 m	16 Aug 1987	
Gold	Joaquim Cruz	(United States) 1987 Indianapolis	Athletics	Men's 1500 m	12 Aug 1987	
Gold	Adauto Domingues	(United States) 1987 Indianapolis	Athletics	Men's 3000 m steeplechase	12 Aug 1987	
Silver	Adauto Domingues	(United States) 1987 Indianapolis	Athletics	Men's 5000 m	13 Aug 1987	
Gold	Ivo Rodrigues	(United States) 1987 Indianapolis	Athletics	Men's marathon	9 Aug 1987	
Bronze	Soraya Telles	(United States) 1987 Indianapolis	Athletics	Women's 800 m	16 Aug 1987	
Bronze	Claudileia Oliveira; Cleide Amaral; Inês Ribeiro; Sheila Santos	(United States) 1987 Indianapolis	Athletics	Women's 4 × 100 m relay	16 Aug 1987	
Gold	Men's basketball team: André Ernesto Stoffel Gerson Victalino Israel Andrade João Vianna Jorge Guerra Marcel de Souza Maury de Souza Oscar Schmidt Paulinho Villas Boas Ricardo Guimarães Rolando Ferreira Sílvio Malvezi	(United States) 1987 Indianapolis	Basketball	Men's tournament	23 Aug 1987	
Silver	Women's basketball team: Hortência Marcari Janeth Arcain Maria Angélica Maria José Bertolotti Maria Paula Silva Marta Sobral Nádia Bento de Lima Neusa Ribeiro Ruth Roberta de Souza Vânia Hernandes Vânia Somaio Teixeira Vanira Souza	(United States) 1987 Indianapolis	Basketball	Women's tournament		
Bronze	Hamilton Rodrigues	(United States) 1987 Indianapolis	Boxing	Men's flyweight (-51 kg)		
Bronze	Wanderley Oliveira	(United States) 1987 Indianapolis	Boxing	Men's light welterweight (-63,5 kg)		
Bronze	Carlos Barcelete	(United States) 1987 Indianapolis	Boxing	Men's super heavyweight (+91 kg)		
Silver	Marcos Mazzaron	(United States) 1987 Indianapolis	Cycling	Men's race individual (road)		
Bronze	Antonio Carlos Hunger; Antônio Silvestre; Fernando Louro; Paulo Jamur	(United States) 1987 Indianapolis	Cycling	Men's 4000 m pursuit team (track)		
Gold	Men's football team: Ademir André Cruz Edu Marangon Cláudio Taffarel Pita Evair Geraldão Careca Luís Carlos Pereira Nelsinho Raí Ricardo Gomes Ricardo Rocha João Paulo Valdo Washington Douglas	(United States) 1987 Indianapolis	Football	Men's tournament	21 Aug 1987	
Bronze	Carlos Fulcher; Carlos Sabino; Gerson Gnoatto; Guilherme Pinto; Marco Monteiro; Ricardo Nassar	(United States) 1987 Indianapolis	Gymnastics	Artistic gymnastics men's all-around team		
Bronze	Luísa Parente	(United States) 1987 Indianapolis	Gymnastics	Artistic gymnastics women's uneven bars		
Bronze	Men's handball team: Drean Dutra Edson Rizzo Everaldo Lopes Gilberto Cardoso José Ronaldo do Nascimento José Luiz Ramalho José Luiz Vieira Luiz Sumaio Marcelo Sampaio Osvaldo Inocente Filho Paulo Bittar Sergio Hortelan Vinicius Tetti	(United States) 1987 Indianapolis	Handball	Men's tournament		
Bronze	Women's handball team: Anita Pires Carla Vasconcelos Cláudia Monteiro Eliane Dias Elza Giovanelli Isabela Maroja Kelma Silva Márcia Tornin Márcia Tomadon Margarete Pioresan Nivia da Cruz Simone Dias Tania Becker	(United States) 1987 Indianapolis	Handball	Women's tournament		
Gold	Sérgio Pessoa	(United States) 1987 Indianapolis	Judo	Men's extra lightweight (-60 kg)		
Silver	Nelson Onmura	(United States) 1987 Indianapolis	Judo	Men's half lightweight (-65 kg)		
Silver	Luís Onmura	(United States) 1987 Indianapolis	Judo	Men's lightweight (-71 kg)		
Gold	Rinaldo Caggiano	(United States) 1987 Indianapolis	Judo	Men's middleweight (-86 kg)		
Gold	Aurélio Miguel	(United States) 1987 Indianapolis	Judo	Men's half heavyweight (-95 kg)		
Silver	Frederico Flexa	(United States) 1987 Indianapolis	Judo	Men's heavyweight (+95 kg)		
Bronze	Rogério Cherubim	(United States) 1987 Indianapolis	Judo	Men's open class		
Gold	Monica Angelucci	(United States) 1987 Indianapolis	Judo	Women's extra lightweight (-48 kg)		
Bronze	Soraya Carvalho	(United States) 1987 Indianapolis	Judo	Women's half middleweight (-61 kg)		
Gold	Soraia André	(United States) 1987 Indianapolis	Judo	Women's half heavyweight (-72 kg)		
Bronze	Rosimeri Salvador	(United States) 1987 Indianapolis	Judo	Women's heavyweight (+72 kg)		
Bronze	Ivana Santana	(United States) 1987 Indianapolis	Judo	Women's open class		
Bronze	Men's roller hockey team: Cláudio Gomes Ermano Santos Fabio Mainardi Fernando Jesus Lauro Terroso Neto Leônidas Agra Maurício Duque Roberto Caribe Silvio Brancacco Vitor Manuel Santos	(United States) 1987 Indianapolis	Roller sports	Roller hockey		
Gold	Ricardo de Carvalho; Ronaldo de Carvalho	(United States) 1987 Indianapolis	Rowing	Men's coxless pair-oared shells		
Bronze	João Deboni; José Augo Almeida	(United States) 1987 Indianapolis	Rowing	Men's lightweight coxless pair		
Silver	Ângelo Roso Neto; Carlos Bezerra; Cláudio Tavares; Dênis Marinho; Flávio de Melo; Helder Lima; José Raimundo Ribeiro; Mauro Weber; Nilton Alonso	(United States) 1987 Indianapolis	Rowing	Men's eight-oared shells		
Silver	Jonas Penteado	(United States) 1987 Indianapolis	Sailing	Men's Laser class		
Bronze	Ivan Pimenta; Marcos Vianna	(United States) 1987 Indianapolis	Sailing	Snipe class		
Bronze	Carlos Courtney; Gastão Brun	(United States) 1987 Indianapolis	Sailing	Star class		
Bronze	Carlos Wanderley; Cláudio Biekarck; Gunnar Ficker	(United States) 1987 Indianapolis	Sailing	Lightning class		
Bronze	Daniel Adler; Ronaldo Senfft; Torben Grael	(United States) 1987 Indianapolis	Sailing	Soling class		
Bronze	Alfredo Lalia; Benevenuto Tilli; Durval Guimarães	(United States) 1987 Indianapolis	Shooting	Men's 25 m center fire pistol team		
Bronze	Alain Dufour; Marcos José Olsen; Rodrigo Bastos	(United States) 1987 Indianapolis	Shooting	Men's trap team		
Bronze	Nara Amaral	(United States) 1987 Indianapolis	Shooting	Women's 50 m pistol		
Silver	Ricardo Prado	(United States) 1987 Indianapolis	Swimming	Men's 200 m backstroke	11 Aug 1987	
Bronze	Ricardo Prado	(United States) 1987 Indianapolis	Swimming	Men's 200 m medley	15 Aug 1987	
Silver	Cristiano Michelena	(United States) 1987 Indianapolis	Swimming	Men's 400 m freestyle	13 Aug 1987	
Bronze	Cristiano Michelena; Cyro Delgado; Jorge Fernandes; Júlio López	(United States) 1987 Indianapolis	Swimming	Men's 4 × 100 m freestyle relay	13 Aug 1987	
Bronze	Cícero Tortelli; Jorge Fernandes; Otávio Silva; Ricardo Prado	(United States) 1987 Indianapolis	Swimming	Men's 4 × 100 m medley relay	15 Aug 1987	
Bronze	Cristiano Michelena; Cyro Delgado; Jorge Fernandes; Júlio López	(United States) 1987 Indianapolis	Swimming	Men's 4 × 200 m freestyle relay	10 Aug 1987	
Bronze	Carlos Kawai	(United States) 1987 Indianapolis	Table tennis	Men's singles		
Bronze	Cláudio Kano	(United States) 1987 Indianapolis	Table tennis	Men's singles		
Silver	Cláudio Kano; Hugo Hoyama	(United States) 1987 Indianapolis	Table tennis	Men's doubles		
Gold	Carlos Kawai; Cláudio Kano; Edson Takahashi; Hugo Hoyama	(United States) 1987 Indianapolis	Table tennis	Men's team		
Bronze	Gilberto Medeiros	(United States) 1987 Indianapolis	Taekwondo	Men's heavyweight (+83 kg)		
Gold	Fernando Roese	(United States) 1987 Indianapolis	Tennis	Men's singles		
Gold	Gisele Miró	(United States) 1987 Indianapolis	Tennis	Women's singles		
Bronze	Fernando Roese; Gisele Miró	(United States) 1987 Indianapolis	Tennis	Mixed doubles		
Bronze	Men's volleyball team: Carlão Bernard Rajzman Domingos Maracanã Elberto Furtado Jr. Helder Zech José Francisco Filho Leonídio de Pra Luís Alexandre Rodrigues Marcelo Dutra Mario Xandó Netto Paulo Jukoski Silva Renan Dal Zotto	(United States) 1987 Indianapolis	Volleyball	Men's tournament	23 Aug 1987	
Bronze	Men's water polo team: Ayrton Silva Eduardo Comini Eric Borges Fernando Rocha Filho Fernando Carsalade Francisco Chaves Neto Gilberto Gargiulo Gilberto Guimarães Hélio Gomes Filho José Meireles Mario Souto Sérgio Figueiredo Jr. Sílvio Manfredi	(United States) 1987 Indianapolis	Water polo	Men's tournament		
Silver	Roberto Leitão	(United States) 1987 Indianapolis	Wrestling	Men's freestyle light heavyweight (-90 kg)		
Gold	Robson Caetano	(Cuba) 1991 Havana	Athletics	Men's 100 m	5 Aug 1991	
Gold	Robson Caetano	(Cuba) 1991 Havana	Athletics	Men's 200 m	8 Aug 1991	
Gold	Eronilde de Araújo	(Cuba) 1991 Havana	Athletics	Men's 400 m hurdles	10 Aug 1991	
Gold	José Mauro Valente	(Cuba) 1991 Havana	Athletics	Men's 1500 m	8 Aug 1991	
Gold	Adauto Domingues	(Cuba) 1991 Havana	Athletics	Men's 3000 m steeplechase	5 Aug 1991	
Silver	Anísio Silva	(Cuba) 1991 Havana	Athletics	Men's triple jump	10 Aug 1991	
Bronze	Marcelo Palma	(Cuba) 1991 Havana	Athletics	Men's 20 km walk	4 Aug 1991	
Silver	José Carlos Santana	(Cuba) 1991 Havana	Athletics	Men's marathon	3 Aug 1991	
Gold	Pedro Ferreira da Silva	(Cuba) 1991 Havana	Athletics	Men's decathlon	8 Aug 1991	
Bronze	Carmen Furtado	(Cuba) 1991 Havana	Athletics	Women's 3000 m	4 Aug 1991	
Gold	Women's basketball team: Adriana dos Santos Ana Lucia Mota Hortência Marcari Janeth Arcain Joycenara Batista Maria Paula Silva Marta Sobral Nádia Bento de Lima Roseli Gustavo Ruth Roberta de Souza Simone Pontello Vânia Hernandes	(Cuba) 1991 Havana	Basketball	Women's tournament	12 Aug 1991	
Bronze	Luiz Claudio Freitas	(Cuba) 1991 Havana	Boxing	Men's flyweight (-51 kg)		
Bronze	Rogério Dezorzi	(Cuba) 1991 Havana	Boxing	Men's featherweight (-57 kg)		
Bronze	Luiz Fernando Silva	(Cuba) 1991 Havana	Boxing	Men's light welterweight (-63,5 kg)		
Bronze	Lucas França	(Cuba) 1991 Havana	Boxing	Men's light middleweight (-71 kg)		
Bronze	Wanderley Magalhães	(Cuba) 1991 Havana	Cycling	Men's race individual (road)		
Bronze	Vitor Alves Teixeira	(Cuba) 1991 Havana	Equestrian	Jumping		
Gold	André Johannpeter; Luiz Felipe de Azevedo; Marcelo Artiaga; Vitor Alves Teixeira	(Cuba) 1991 Havana	Equestrian	Jumping team		
Gold	Luísa Parente	(Cuba) 1991 Havana	Gymnastics	Artistic gymnastics women's uneven bars		
Gold	Luísa Parente	(Cuba) 1991 Havana	Gymnastics	Artistic gymnastics women's vault		
Silver	Alessandra Frederico; Alessandra Seligman; Bibiana Castro; Débora Morais; Gabriela Baal; Valquíria Rosário	(Cuba) 1991 Havana	Gymnastics	Rhythmic gymnastics group all-around		
Silver	Men's handball team: Almir Albuquerque Antonio Carlos Gonçalves Cláudio Brito Fausto Steinwandter Gilberto Cardoso Ivan Maziero Ivan Raimundo Pinheiro José Ronaldo do Nascimento José Luiz Vieira Osvaldo Inocente Filho Paulo Roberto Martins Sergio Hortelan Valmir Fassina	(Cuba) 1991 Havana	Handball	Men's tournament		
Bronze	Sumio Tsujimoto	(Cuba) 1991 Havana	Judo	Men's flyweight (-56 kg)		
Gold	Shigueto Yamasaki	(Cuba) 1991 Havana	Judo	Men's extra lightweight (-60 kg)		
Silver	Sérgio Ricardo Oliveira	(Cuba) 1991 Havana	Judo	Men's lightweight (-71 kg)		
Bronze	Renato Gagnino	(Cuba) 1991 Havana	Judo	Men's half middleweight (-78 kg)		
Bronze	Frederico Flexa	(Cuba) 1991 Havana	Judo	Men's heavyweight (+95 kg)		
Bronze	Monica Angelucci	(Cuba) 1991 Havana	Judo	Women's flyweight (-45 kg)		
Bronze	Maria Cristina de Souza	(Cuba) 1991 Havana	Judo	Women's extra lightweight (-48 kg)		
Silver	Patricia Bevilacqua	(Cuba) 1991 Havana	Judo	Women's half lightweight (-52 kg)		
Bronze	Edilene Andrade	(Cuba) 1991 Havana	Judo	Women's heavyweight (+72 kg)		
Bronze	Soraia André	(Cuba) 1991 Havana	Judo	Women's open class		
Silver	Men's roller hockey team: Alan Feres Karan Antonio Cavalaro Fabio Mainardi Flávio Pontes Guide Jurandir da Silva Leônidas Agra Marcelo Cavalaro Maurício Duque Roberto Caribe Vitor Manuel Santos	(Cuba) 1991 Havana	Roller sports	Roller hockey		
Bronze	Carlos de Almeida; Cláudio Tavares	(Cuba) 1991 Havana	Rowing	Men's coxless pair-oared shells		
Bronze	Alexandre Fernandes; Marcos Arantes; Oswaldo Kuster Neto	(Cuba) 1991 Havana	Rowing	Men's coxed pair-oared shells		
Silver	Christoph Bergmann	(Cuba) 1991 Havana	Sailing	Finn class		
Gold	Peter Transcheit	(Cuba) 1991 Havana	Sailing	Men's Laser class		
Silver	Bernardo Arndt; Eduardo Melchert	(Cuba) 1991 Havana	Sailing	Men's 470 class		
Silver	Antonio Paes Leme; Luís Marcelo Maia	(Cuba) 1991 Havana	Sailing	Snipe class		
Bronze	Cláudio Biekarck; Gunnar Ficker; Marcelo Batista da Silva	(Cuba) 1991 Havana	Sailing	Lightning class		
Silver	Marion Scheel	(Cuba) 1991 Havana	Sailing	Women's Laser Radial class		
Bronze	Cláudia Swan; Monica Scheel	(Cuba) 1991 Havana	Sailing	Women's 470 class		
Bronze	Wilson Scheidemantel	(Cuba) 1991 Havana	Shooting	Men's 10 m air pistol		
Bronze	Alejandro Stisin; Durval Guimarães; Wilson Scheidemantel	(Cuba) 1991 Havana	Shooting	Men's 10 m air pistol team		
Silver	Durval Guimarães; Jodson Edington; Wilson Scheidemantel	(Cuba) 1991 Havana	Shooting	Men's 25 m center fire pistol team		
Bronze	Tânia Giansante	(Cuba) 1991 Havana	Shooting	Women's 10 m air pistol		
Bronze	Angelamaria Lachtermacher; Lucia Maria Bosco; Victoria Egger	(Cuba) 1991 Havana	Shooting	Women's 50 m rifle prone team		
Bronze	Angelamaria Lachtermacher; Lucia Maria Bosco; Victoria Egger	(Cuba) 1991 Havana	Shooting	Women's 50 m rifle three positions team		
Bronze	Gustavo Borges	(Cuba) 1991 Havana	Swimming	Men's 50 m freestyle	17 Aug 1991	
Bronze	Eduardo Piccinini	(Cuba) 1991 Havana	Swimming	Men's 100 m butterfly	13 Aug 1991	
Gold	Gustavo Borges	(Cuba) 1991 Havana	Swimming	Men's 100 m freestyle	14 Aug 1991	
Gold	Rogério Romero	(Cuba) 1991 Havana	Swimming	Men's 200 m backstroke	14 Aug 1991	
Silver	Gustavo Borges	(Cuba) 1991 Havana	Swimming	Men's 200 m freestyle	12 Aug 1991	
Gold	Emanuel Nascimento; Gustavo Borges; Júlio López; Teófilo Ferreira	(Cuba) 1991 Havana	Swimming	Men's 4 × 100 m freestyle relay	16 Aug 1991	
Silver	Cassiano Leal; Emanuel Nascimento; Gustavo Borges; Teófilo Ferreira	(Cuba) 1991 Havana	Swimming	Men's 4 × 200 m freestyle relay	13 Aug 1991	
Bronze	Isabelle Vieira; Paula Marsiglia; Paula Renata Aguiar; Paoletti Filippini	(Cuba) 1991 Havana	Swimming	Women's 4 × 100 m freestyle relay	14 Aug 1991	
Silver	Ana Catarina Azevedo; Glicia Lofego; Paoletti Filippini; Celina Endo	(Cuba) 1991 Havana	Swimming	Women's 4 × 100 m medley relay	17 Aug 1991	
Gold	Hugo Hoyama	(Cuba) 1991 Havana	Table tennis	Men's singles		
Silver	Cláudio Kano	(Cuba) 1991 Havana	Table tennis	Men's singles		
Gold	Cláudio Kano; Hugo Hoyama	(Cuba) 1991 Havana	Table tennis	Men's doubles		
Bronze	Carlos Kawai; Silney Yuta	(Cuba) 1991 Havana	Table tennis	Men's doubles		
Gold	Carlos Kawai; Cláudio Kano; Hugo Hoyama; Silney Yuta	(Cuba) 1991 Havana	Table tennis	Men's team		
Bronze	Carla Tibério; Lyanne Kosaka; Marta Massuda; Monica Doti	(Cuba) 1991 Havana	Table tennis	Women's team		
Bronze	César Galvão	(Cuba) 1991 Havana	Taekwondo	Men's finweight (-50 kg)		
Gold	Fábio Goulart	(Cuba) 1991 Havana	Taekwondo	Men's middleweight (-83 kg)		
Silver	Lúcio Freitas	(Cuba) 1991 Havana	Taekwondo	Men's heavyweight (+83 kg)		
Bronze	Marcelo Saliola	(Cuba) 1991 Havana	Tennis	Men's singles		
Gold	Marcelo Saliola; Nelson Aerts; William Kyriakos Jr.	(Cuba) 1991 Havana	Tennis	Men's team		
Bronze	Andrea Vieira	(Cuba) 1991 Havana	Tennis	Women's singles		
Bronze	Cláudia Chabalgoity	(Cuba) 1991 Havana	Tennis	Women's singles		
Silver	Andrea Vieira; Cláudia Chabalgoity	(Cuba) 1991 Havana	Tennis	Women's doubles		
Gold	Andrea Vieira; Cláudia Chabalgoity; Gisele Miró	(Cuba) 1991 Havana	Tennis	Women's team		
Silver	Cláudia Chabalgoity; William Kyriakos Jr.	(Cuba) 1991 Havana	Tennis	Mixed doubles		
Silver	Men's volleyball team: Tande Allan Cocato Pampa Carlão Carlos Toaldo Kid Giovane Gávio Janelson Carvalho Jorge Edson Marcelo Negrão Maurício Lima Talmo Oliveira	(Cuba) 1991 Havana	Volleyball	Men's tournament	18 Aug 1991	
Silver	Women's volleyball team: Adriana Samuel Ana Moser Ana Flávia Sanglard Ana Ida Alvares Ana Maria Volponi Cilene Rocha Cristina Lopes Fernanda Venturini Fofão Kerly Santos Ricarda Lima Silvana Kühl	(Cuba) 1991 Havana	Volleyball	Women's tournament	18 Aug 1991	
Bronze	Men's water polo team: Antonio Carlos Costa Armando Gutfreund Daniel Mameri Eduardo Comini Eric Borges Fernando Rocha Filho Giuliano Bertolucci Hélio Gomes Filho José Meireles Paulo Abreu Paulo Comini Roberto Chiappini Rodney Andrew Bell	(Cuba) 1991 Havana	Water polo	Men's tournament		
Bronze	Emilson Dantas	(Cuba) 1991 Havana	Weightlifting	Men's first heavyweight (-100 kg) – snatch		
Bronze	Emilson Dantas	(Cuba) 1991 Havana	Weightlifting	Men's first heavyweight (-100 kg) – clean and jerk		
Bronze	Emilson Dantas	(Cuba) 1991 Havana	Weightlifting	Men's first heavyweight (-100 kg) – total		
Bronze	André Domingos	(Argentina) 1995 Mar del Plata	Athletics	Men's 100 m	18 Mar 1995	
Gold	Eronilde de Araújo	(Argentina) 1995 Mar del Plata	Athletics	Men's 400 m hurdles	24 Mar 1995	
Silver	Éverson Teixeira	(Argentina) 1995 Mar del Plata	Athletics	Men's 400 m hurdles	24 Mar 1995	
Gold	José Luíz Barbosa	(Argentina) 1995 Mar del Plata	Athletics	Men's 800 m	23 Mar 1995	
Gold	Joaquim Cruz	(Argentina) 1995 Mar del Plata	Athletics	Men's 1500 m	19 Mar 1995	
Gold	Wander Moura	(Argentina) 1995 Mar del Plata	Athletics	Men's 3000 m steeplechase	22 Mar 1995	
Silver	Wander Moura	(Argentina) 1995 Mar del Plata	Athletics	Men's 5000 m	25 Mar 1995	
Silver	Valdenor dos Santos	(Argentina) 1995 Mar del Plata	Athletics	Men's 10,000 m	18 Mar 1995	
Bronze	Ronaldo da Costa	(Argentina) 1995 Mar del Plata	Athletics	Men's 10,000 m	18 Mar 1995	
Bronze	Luiz Carlos da Silva	(Argentina) 1995 Mar del Plata	Athletics	Men's marathon	25 Mar 1995	
Silver	Luciana Mendes	(Argentina) 1995 Mar del Plata	Athletics	Women's 800 m	23 Mar 1995	
Gold	Carmen Furtado	(Argentina) 1995 Mar del Plata	Athletics	Women's 10,000 m	17 Mar 1995	
Bronze	Men's basketball team: Alberto Seabra André Matoso Aristides Josuel dos Santos Demétrius Conrado Ferraciú João Batista Guia Joelcio Joerke Luís Fernando da Silva Luiz de Azevedo Marco Aurélio Pegolo Rogério Klafke Rolando Ferreira Wilson Minuci	(Argentina) 1995 Mar del Plata	Basketball	Men's tournament	25 Mar 1995	
Silver	Acelino Freitas	(Argentina) 1995 Mar del Plata	Boxing	Men's lightweight (-60 kg)		
Bronze	Sebastián Cuattrin	(Argentina) 1995 Mar del Plata	Canoeing	Men's K-1 1000 m		
Bronze	Álvaro Koslowski; Sebastián Cuattrin	(Argentina) 1995 Mar del Plata	Canoeing	Men's K-2 1000 m		
Bronze	Jamil Suaiden; Hernandes Quadri; Márcio May; Mauro Ribeiro	(Argentina) 1995 Mar del Plata	Cycling	Men's 4000 m pursuit team (track)		
Bronze	André Giovanini	(Argentina) 1995 Mar del Plata	Equestrian	Eventing		
Gold	André Johannpeter; Nelson Pessoa; Rodrigo Pessoa; Vitor Alves Teixeira	(Argentina) 1995 Mar del Plata	Equestrian	Jumping team		
Gold	André Giovanini; Luciano Drubi; Ruy Fonseca; Serguei Fofanoff	(Argentina) 1995 Mar del Plata	Equestrian	Eventing team		
Bronze	Camila Ferezin; Dayane Camilo; Fernanda Festa; Luciana Barrichello; Luciane de Oliveira	(Argentina) 1995 Mar del Plata	Gymnastics	Rhythmic gymnastics group all-around		
Silver	Men's handball team: Agberto Matos Cláudio Brito Daniel Pinheiro Andrade Eduardo Reis Fausto Steinwandter Gilberto Cardoso Ivan Maziero Ivan Raimundo Pinheiro José Ronaldo do Nascimento Marcos Antônio Cezar Marcelo Sampaio Milton Pelissari Osvaldo Inocente Filho Winglitton Rocha	(Argentina) 1995 Mar del Plata	Handball	Men's tournament		
Bronze	Women's handball team: Aliteia Puzi Andrea Sacramento Aurea Comparim Cristina Landgraf Ema Lorenzon Eva Paula Freire Margarida Conte Maria José Sales Nívia da Cruz Rosana de Aleluia Rosangela Silva Oliveira Rose Anne Gomes Verônica Gomes Soraya Novaes	(Argentina) 1995 Mar del Plata	Handball	Women's tournament		
Bronze	Rodolfo Yamayose	(Argentina) 1995 Mar del Plata	Judo	Men's flyweight (-56 kg)		
Bronze	Carlos Bortole	(Argentina) 1995 Mar del Plata	Judo	Men's extra lightweight (-60 kg)		
Bronze	Henrique Guimarães	(Argentina) 1995 Mar del Plata	Judo	Men's half lightweight (-65 kg)		
Bronze	Sérgio Ricardo Oliveira	(Argentina) 1995 Mar del Plata	Judo	Men's lightweight (-71 kg)		
Bronze	Flávio Canto	(Argentina) 1995 Mar del Plata	Judo	Men's half middleweight (-78 kg)		
Silver	Carlos Eduardo Matt	(Argentina) 1995 Mar del Plata	Judo	Men's middleweight (-86 kg)		
Silver	Daniel Dell'Aquila	(Argentina) 1995 Mar del Plata	Judo	Men's half heavyweight (-95 kg)		
Gold	José Mario Tranquillini	(Argentina) 1995 Mar del Plata	Judo	Men's heavyweight (+95 kg)		
Bronze	Andrea Rodrigues	(Argentina) 1995 Mar del Plata	Judo	Women's extra lightweight (-48 kg)		
Bronze	Danielle Zangrando	(Argentina) 1995 Mar del Plata	Judo	Women's lightweight (-56 kg)		
Bronze	Vânia Ishii	(Argentina) 1995 Mar del Plata	Judo	Women's middleweight (-66 kg)		
Bronze	Valéria Brandino	(Argentina) 1995 Mar del Plata	Judo	Women's half heavyweight (-72 kg)		
Silver	Edilene Andrade	(Argentina) 1995 Mar del Plata	Judo	Women's heavyweight (+72 kg)		
Bronze	Altamiro Oliveira	(Argentina) 1995 Mar del Plata	Karate	Men's kumite (+80 kg)		
Gold	José Gomes	(Argentina) 1995 Mar del Plata	Karate	Men's kumite open class		
Silver	Altamiro Oliveira; Antonio Carlos Pinto; Erivaldo Pinto; José Gomes	(Argentina) 1995 Mar del Plata	Karate	Men's kumite team		
Silver	Iara Oliveira	(Argentina) 1995 Mar del Plata	Karate	Women's kumite (-53 kg)		
Silver	Iara Oliveira; Rosemarie Perez; Scheila Bortagaray; Yuka Yonamine	(Argentina) 1995 Mar del Plata	Karate	Women's kumite team		
Silver	Men's roller hockey team: Fabio Bossi Flávio Pontes Guide Gustavo Marques Karan Feres Karan Jr. Leonardo Agra Leônidas Agra Luzardo Silveira Maurício Lazaro Rodrigo Pontes Braz Romeu Nogueira	(Argentina) 1995 Mar del Plata	Roller sports	Roller hockey		
Silver	Dirceu Marinho; Marcelus dos Santos	(Argentina) 1995 Mar del Plata	Rowing	Men's double sculls		
Bronze	Carlos de Almeida; Cláudio Tavares	(Argentina) 1995 Mar del Plata	Rowing	Men's coxless pair-oared shells		
Gold	Robert Scheidt	(Argentina) 1995 Mar del Plata	Sailing	Men's Laser class		
Silver	Cláudio Biekarck; Gunnar Ficker; Marcelo Batista da Silva	(Argentina) 1995 Mar del Plata	Sailing	Lightning class		
Bronze	Maria Krahe	(Argentina) 1995 Mar del Plata	Sailing	Women's Laser Radial class		
Gold	Márcia Pellicano	(Argentina) 1995 Mar del Plata	Sailing	Women's Europe class		
Silver	Júlio Almeida	(Argentina) 1995 Mar del Plata	Shooting	Men's 25 m center fire pistol		
Silver	Fernando Cardoso Jr. Júlio Almeida; Mauriverth Spena	(Argentina) 1995 Mar del Plata	Shooting	Men's 25 m center fire pistol team		
Bronze	Jodson Edington	(Argentina) 1995 Mar del Plata	Shooting	Men's 50 m pistol		
Bronze	Luiz Felipe Borges; Luiz Eduardo Borges; Mario Silvio de Oliveira; Paul Conolly	(Argentina) 1995 Mar del Plata	Squash	Men's team		
Bronze	Flávia Roberts	(Argentina) 1995 Mar del Plata	Squash	Women's singles		
Bronze	Alessandra Bello; Aline da Silva; Flávia Roberts; Karina Kerr	(Argentina) 1995 Mar del Plata	Squash	Women's team		
Bronze	Alessandra Bello; Aline da Silva; Flávia Roberts; Karina Kerr; Luiz Felipe Borges; Luiz Eduardo Borges; Mario Silvio de Oliveira; Paul Conolly	(Argentina) 1995 Mar del Plata	Squash	Overall		
Gold	Fernando Scherer	(Argentina) 1995 Mar del Plata	Swimming	Men's 50 m freestyle		
Silver	Eduardo Piccinini	(Argentina) 1995 Mar del Plata	Swimming	Men's 100 m butterfly		
Gold	Gustavo Borges	(Argentina) 1995 Mar del Plata	Swimming	Men's 100 m freestyle		
Bronze	Fernando Scherer	(Argentina) 1995 Mar del Plata	Swimming	Men's 100 m freestyle		
Bronze	Rogério Romero	(Argentina) 1995 Mar del Plata	Swimming	Men's 200 m backstroke		
Bronze	André Teixeira	(Argentina) 1995 Mar del Plata	Swimming	Men's 200 m butterfly		
Gold	Gustavo Borges	(Argentina) 1995 Mar del Plata	Swimming	Men's 200 m freestyle		
Silver	Luiz Lima	(Argentina) 1995 Mar del Plata	Swimming	Men's 400 m freestyle		
Silver	Luiz Lima	(Argentina) 1995 Mar del Plata	Swimming	Men's 1500 m freestyle		
Silver	Eduardo Piccinini; Fernando Scherer; Gustavo Borges; Roberto Piovesan	(Argentina) 1995 Mar del Plata	Swimming	Men's 4 × 100 m freestyle relay		
Silver	André Teixeira; Gustavo Borges; Oscar Godói; Rogério Romero	(Argentina) 1995 Mar del Plata	Swimming	Men's 4 × 100 m medley relay		
Silver	Cassiano Leal; Fernando Scherer; Gustavo Borges; Teófilo Ferreira	(Argentina) 1995 Mar del Plata	Swimming	Men's 4 × 200 m freestyle relay		
Bronze	Fabíola Molina	(Argentina) 1995 Mar del Plata	Swimming	Women's 100 m backstroke		
Silver	Gabrielle Rose	(Argentina) 1995 Mar del Plata	Swimming	Women's 100 m butterfly		
Bronze	Gabrielle Rose; Paula Marsiglia; Paula Renata Aguiar; Raquel Takaya	(Argentina) 1995 Mar del Plata	Swimming	Women's 4 × 100 m freestyle relay		
Bronze	Fabíola Molina; Gabrielle Rose; Patrícia Comini; Paula Renata Aguiar	(Argentina) 1995 Mar del Plata	Swimming	Women's 4 × 100 m medley relay		
Gold	Hugo Hoyama	(Argentina) 1995 Mar del Plata	Table tennis	Men's singles		
Silver	Cláudio Kano	(Argentina) 1995 Mar del Plata	Table tennis	Men's singles		
Gold	Cláudio Kano; Hugo Hoyama	(Argentina) 1995 Mar del Plata	Table tennis	Men's doubles		
Gold	Carlos Kawai; Cláudio Kano; Hugo Hoyama	(Argentina) 1995 Mar del Plata	Table tennis	Men's team		
Bronze	Hugo Hoyama; Livia Kosaka	(Argentina) 1995 Mar del Plata	Table tennis	Mixed doubles		
Silver	Lúcio Freitas	(Argentina) 1995 Mar del Plata	Taekwondo	Men's heavyweight (+83 kg)		
Bronze	Andrea Vieira; Luciana Tella	(Argentina) 1995 Mar del Plata	Tennis	Women's doubles		
Bronze	Andrea Vieira; Luciana Tella; Miriam D'Agostini; Vanessa Menga	(Argentina) 1995 Mar del Plata	Tennis	Women's team		
Gold	Leandro Macedo	(Argentina) 1995 Mar del Plata	Triathlon	Men's individual	26 Mar 1995	
Silver	Men's water polo team: Adriano Marsili Alexandre Miguel Lopes Armando Gutfreund Daniel Mameri Diogo Figueiredo Erik Seegerer Guilherme Pinciroli Michel Pontes Vieira Paulo César Fernandes Ricardo Perrone Roberto Chiappini Rodrigo Yacubian Yansel Gallindo	(Argentina) 1995 Mar del Plata	Water polo	Men's tournament		
Bronze	Emilson Dantas	(Argentina) 1995 Mar del Plata	Weightlifting	Men's first heavyweight (-99 kg) – snatch		
Bronze	Emilson Dantas	(Argentina) 1995 Mar del Plata	Weightlifting	Men's first heavyweight (-99 kg) – clean and jerk		
Bronze	Claudinei Quirino	(Canada) 1999 Winnipeg	Athletics	Men's 100 m	25 Jul 1999	
Gold	Claudinei Quirino	(Canada) 1999 Winnipeg	Athletics	Men's 200 m	28 Jul 1999	
Gold	Eronilde de Araújo	(Canada) 1999 Winnipeg	Athletics	Men's 400 m hurdles	28 Jul 1999	
Bronze	Hudson de Souza	(Canada) 1999 Winnipeg	Athletics	Men's 1500 m	30 Jul 1999	
Silver	Elenilson da Silva	(Canada) 1999 Winnipeg	Athletics	Men's 5000 m	24 Jul 1999	
Gold	Elenilson da Silva	(Canada) 1999 Winnipeg	Athletics	Men's 10,000 m	27 Jul 1999	
Gold	Vanderlei Cordeiro de Lima	(Canada) 1999 Winnipeg	Athletics	Men's marathon	25 Jul 1999	
Bronze	Éder Fialho	(Canada) 1999 Winnipeg	Athletics	Men's marathon	25 Jul 1999	
Gold	André Domingos; Claudinei Quirino; Édson Luciano; Raphael de Oliveira	(Canada) 1999 Winnipeg	Athletics	Men's 4 × 100 m relay	30 Jul 1999	
Silver	Anderson Jorge dos Santos; Eronilde de Araújo; Claudinei Quirino; Sanderlei Parrela; Cleverson da Silva (heats)	(Canada) 1999 Winnipeg	Athletics	Men's 4 × 400 m relay	30 Jul 1999	
Silver	Maurren Maggi	(Canada) 1999 Winnipeg	Athletics	Women's 100 m hurdles	25 Jul 1999	
Silver	Lucimar de Moura	(Canada) 1999 Winnipeg	Athletics	Women's 200 m	28 Jul 1999	
Bronze	Viviany de Oliveira	(Canada) 1999 Winnipeg	Athletics	Women's marathon	25 Jul 1999	
Silver	Luciane Dambacher	(Canada) 1999 Winnipeg	Athletics	Women's high jump	30 Jul 1999	
Gold	Maurren Maggi	(Canada) 1999 Winnipeg	Athletics	Women's long jump	24 Jul 1999	
Gold	Elisângela Adriano	(Canada) 1999 Winnipeg	Athletics	Women's discus throw	30 Jul 1999	
Gold	Men's basketball team: André Guimarães Aristides Josuel dos Santos Aylton Tesch Caio Cazziolato Demétrius Conrado Ferraciú Helio García Luiz Fernando de Souza Marcelinho Machado Michel Nascimiento Rogério Klafke Sandro Varejão Vanderlei Mazuchini	(Canada) 1999 Winnipeg	Basketball	Men's tournament	8 Aug 1999	
Silver	Kelson Pinto	(Canada) 1999 Winnipeg	Boxing	Men's light welterweight (-63,5 kg)		
Silver	Laudelino Barros	(Canada) 1999 Winnipeg	Boxing	Men's light heavyweight (-81 kg)		
Bronze	Marcelino Novaes	(Canada) 1999 Winnipeg	Boxing	Men's heavyweight (-91 kg)		
Bronze	Cláudio Aires	(Canada) 1999 Winnipeg	Boxing	Men's super heavyweight (+91 kg)		
Bronze	Carlos Campos	(Canada) 1999 Winnipeg	Canoeing	Men's K-1 500 m		
Bronze	Carlos Campos; Sebastián Cuattrin	(Canada) 1999 Winnipeg	Canoeing	Men's K-2 500 m		
Silver	Sebastián Cuattrin	(Canada) 1999 Winnipeg	Canoeing	Men's K-1 1000 m		
Silver	Carlos Campos; Sebastián Cuattrin	(Canada) 1999 Winnipeg	Canoeing	Men's K-2 1000 m		
Bronze	André Caye; Carlos Campos; Roger Caumo; Sebastián Cuattrin	(Canada) 1999 Winnipeg	Canoeing	Men's K-4 1000 m		
Bronze	Márcio May	(Canada) 1999 Winnipeg	Cycling	Men's time trial (road)		
Bronze	Janildes Fernandes	(Canada) 1999 Winnipeg	Cycling	Women's race individual (road)		
Bronze	Vitor Alves Teixeira	(Canada) 1999 Winnipeg	Equestrian	Jumping		
Silver	Artemus de Almeida; Luciano Drubi; Marcelo Tosi; Serguei Fofanoff	(Canada) 1999 Winnipeg	Equestrian	Eventing team		
Gold	Álvaro de Miranda Neto; André Johannpeter; Bernardo Alves; Vitor Alves Teixeira	(Canada) 1999 Winnipeg	Equestrian	Jumping team		
Bronze	Daiane dos Santos	(Canada) 1999 Winnipeg	Gymnastics	Artistic gymnastics women's floor exercise		
Silver	Daiane dos Santos	(Canada) 1999 Winnipeg	Gymnastics	Artistic gymnastics women's vault		
Bronze	Camila Comin; Daiane dos Santos; Daniele Hypólito; Heine Araújo; Marilia Gomes; Patrícia Aoki	(Canada) 1999 Winnipeg	Gymnastics	Artistic gymnastics women's all-around team		
Gold	Alessandra Ferezin; Camila Ferezin; Dayane Camilo; Flávia de Faria; Juliana Coradini; Michele Salzano	(Canada) 1999 Winnipeg	Gymnastics	Rhythmic gymnastics group all-around		
Silver	Men's handball team: Alexandre Folhas Alexandre Vasconcelos Bruno Souza Carlos Alberto Freitas Carlos Ertel Fabio Vanini Gustavo Henrique Silva Hélio Justino Ivan Raimundo Pinheiro Leonardo Bortolini Lúcio Mauro Martins Marcos Paulo dos Santos Milton Pelissari	(Canada) 1999 Winnipeg	Handball	Men's tournament		
Gold	Women's handball team: Aline Silva Chana Masson Dilane Roese Idalina Mesquita Juceli Sales Lucila Vianna da Silva Margareth Montão Margarida Conte Maria José Sales Rosana de Aleluia Sandra de Oliveira Valéria de Oliveira Viviane Jacques	(Canada) 1999 Winnipeg	Handball	Women's tournament		
Silver	Denílson Lourenço	(Canada) 1999 Winnipeg	Judo	Men's extra lightweight (-60 kg)		
Bronze	Sebastian Pereira	(Canada) 1999 Winnipeg	Judo	Men's lightweight (-73 kg)		
Silver	Flávio Canto	(Canada) 1999 Winnipeg	Judo	Men's half middleweight (-81 kg)		
Bronze	Marcelo Figueiredo	(Canada) 1999 Winnipeg	Judo	Men's half heavyweight (-100 kg)		
Silver	Daniel Hernandes	(Canada) 1999 Winnipeg	Judo	Men's heavyweight (+100 kg)		
Bronze	Fabiane Hukuda	(Canada) 1999 Winnipeg	Judo	Women's half lightweight (-52 kg)		
Bronze	Danielle Zangrando	(Canada) 1999 Winnipeg	Judo	Women's lightweight (-57 kg)		
Gold	Vânia Ishii	(Canada) 1999 Winnipeg	Judo	Women's half middleweight (-63 kg)		
Bronze	Edinanci Silva	(Canada) 1999 Winnipeg	Judo	Women's half heavyweight (-78 kg)		
Bronze	Priscila Marques	(Canada) 1999 Winnipeg	Judo	Women's heavyweight (+78 kg)		
Bronze	Sidirley de Souza	(Canada) 1999 Winnipeg	Karate	Men's kumite (-60 kg)		
Bronze	Célio René	(Canada) 1999 Winnipeg	Karate	Men's kumite (-65 kg)		
Silver	Antonio Carlos Pinto	(Canada) 1999 Winnipeg	Karate	Men's kumite (-75 kg)		
Bronze	Massimiliano Pagano	(Canada) 1999 Winnipeg	Karate	Men's kumite (-75 kg)		
Silver	Nelson Sardenberg	(Canada) 1999 Winnipeg	Karate	Men's kumite (-80 kg)		
Silver	Altamiro Oliveira	(Canada) 1999 Winnipeg	Karate	Men's kumite (+80 kg)		
Silver	Maria Cecília Maia	(Canada) 1999 Winnipeg	Karate	Women's kumite (-60 kg)		
Gold	Lucélia Ribeiro	(Canada) 1999 Winnipeg	Karate	Women's kumite (+60 kg)		
Bronze	Men's roller hockey team: Alex Borba Clerimar da Silva Daniel Bellangero Eric Hayashida Érico Airoldi Fabio Bossi Pablo Gomes Navarro Paulo Sums Renato Lopes Nogueira Rubens Vaz de Oliveira	(Canada) 1999 Winnipeg	Roller sports	Roller hockey		
Bronze	Diego Alencar	(Canada) 1999 Winnipeg	Roller sports	Artistic free skating men's		
Bronze	Janaína Espíndola	(Canada) 1999 Winnipeg	Roller sports	Artistic free skating women's		
Bronze	Luciana Roiha; Max Santos	(Canada) 1999 Winnipeg	Roller sports	Artistic free skating mixed doubles		
Silver	Alexander Altair Soares; Gibran Cunha	(Canada) 1999 Winnipeg	Rowing	Men's coxless pair-oared shells		
Bronze	Bruno Prada	(Canada) 1999 Winnipeg	Sailing	Finn class		
Gold	Robert Scheidt	(Canada) 1999 Winnipeg	Sailing	Men's Laser class		
Silver	Ricardo Winicki	(Canada) 1999 Winnipeg	Sailing	Men's sailboard		
Silver	Alexandre Paradeda; Flávio Só	(Canada) 1999 Winnipeg	Sailing	Snipe class		
Silver	Cláudio Biekarck; Gunnar Ficker; Marcelo Batista da Silva	(Canada) 1999 Winnipeg	Sailing	Lightning class		
Silver	Cláudio Cardoso; Patrícia Kirchner	(Canada) 1999 Winnipeg	Sailing	Hobie 16 class		
Bronze	Isabela Maraucci	(Canada) 1999 Winnipeg	Sailing	Women's Laser Radial class		
Silver	Fernanda Guedes	(Canada) 1999 Winnipeg	Sailing	Women's Europe class		
Bronze	Christina Forte	(Canada) 1999 Winnipeg	Sailing	Women's sailboard		
Bronze	Luís da Graça	(Canada) 1999 Winnipeg	Shooting	Men's trap		
Bronze	Ronivaldo Conceição	(Canada) 1999 Winnipeg	Squash	Men's singles		
Silver	Luiz Eduardo Borges; Mario Silvio de Oliveira; Paul Conolly; Ronivaldo Conceição	(Canada) 1999 Winnipeg	Squash	Men's team		
Bronze	Adriana Moura; Carmén Helena de Almeida; Flávia Roberts; Karen Redfern	(Canada) 1999 Winnipeg	Squash	Women's team		
Gold	Fernando Scherer	(Canada) 1999 Winnipeg	Swimming	Men's 50 m freestyle	6 Aug 1999	
Silver	Alexandre Massura	(Canada) 1999 Winnipeg	Swimming	Men's 100 m backstroke	6 Aug 1999	
Gold	Fernando Scherer	(Canada) 1999 Winnipeg	Swimming	Men's 100 m freestyle	4 Aug 1999	
Bronze	Gustavo Borges	(Canada) 1999 Winnipeg	Swimming	Men's 100 m freestyle	4 Aug 1999	
Gold	Leonardo Costa	(Canada) 1999 Winnipeg	Swimming	Men's 200 m backstroke	4 Aug 1999	
Gold	Gustavo Borges	(Canada) 1999 Winnipeg	Swimming	Men's 200 m freestyle	2 Aug 1999	
Bronze	Leonardo Costa	(Canada) 1999 Winnipeg	Swimming	Men's 200 m freestyle	2 Aug 1999	
Gold	Luiz Lima	(Canada) 1999 Winnipeg	Swimming	Men's 400 m freestyle	5 Aug 1999	
Silver	Luiz Lima	(Canada) 1999 Winnipeg	Swimming	Men's 1500 m freestyle	6 Aug 1999	
Gold	André Cordeiro; César Quintaes; Fernando Scherer; Gustavo Borges	(Canada) 1999 Winnipeg	Swimming	Men's 4 × 100 m freestyle relay	5 Aug 1999	
Gold	Alexandre Massura; Fernando Scherer; Gustavo Borges; Marcelo Tomazini	(Canada) 1999 Winnipeg	Swimming	Men's 4 × 100 m medley relay	7 Aug 1999	
Silver	André Cordeiro; Gustavo Borges; Leonardo Costa; Rodrigo Castro	(Canada) 1999 Winnipeg	Swimming	Men's 4 × 200 m freestyle relay	3 Aug 1999	
Bronze	Fabíola Molina; Flávia Delaroli; Juliana Machado; Rebeca Gusmão	(Canada) 1999 Winnipeg	Swimming	Women's 4 × 100 m freestyle relay	4 Aug 1999	
Bronze	Fabíola Molina; Patrícia Comini; Tanya Schun; Tatiana Lemos	(Canada) 1999 Winnipeg	Swimming	Women's 4 × 100 m medley relay	6 Aug 1999	
Bronze	Ana Muniz; Monique Ferreira; Nayara Ribeiro; Tatiana Lemos	(Canada) 1999 Winnipeg	Swimming	Women's 4 × 200 m freestyle relay	2 Aug 1999	
Bronze	Carolina Moraes; Isabela Moraes	(Canada) 1999 Winnipeg	Artistic swimming	Duet	6 Aug 1999	
Bronze	Carlos Kawai; Hugo Hoyama; Thiago Monteiro	(Canada) 1999 Winnipeg	Table tennis	Men's team		
Bronze	Eugênia Ferreira; Lígia Silva; Lyanne Kosaka	(Canada) 1999 Winnipeg	Table tennis	Women's team		
Bronze	Paulo Taicher	(Canada) 1999 Winnipeg	Tennis	Men's singles		
Gold	André Sá; Paulo Taicher	(Canada) 1999 Winnipeg	Tennis	Men's doubles		
Gold	Joana Cortez; Vanessa Menga	(Canada) 1999 Winnipeg	Tennis	Women's doubles		
Silver	Carla Moreno	(Canada) 1999 Winnipeg	Triathlon	Women's individual	24 Jul 1999	
Silver	Adriano Garrido; Lula Barbosa	(Canada) 1999 Winnipeg	Beach volleyball	Men's tournament		
Bronze	Franco Neto; Roberto Lopes	(Canada) 1999 Winnipeg	Beach volleyball	Men's tournament		
Gold	Adriana Behar; Shelda Bede	(Canada) 1999 Winnipeg	Beach volleyball	Women's tournament		
Silver	Men's volleyball team: André Heller Carlos Axé Douglas Chiarotti Giba Gustavo Endres Joel Monteiro Marcelo Elgarten Marcelo Negrão Nalbert Bitencourt Paulo Mendonça Ferreira Renato Felizardo Ricardo Garcia	(Canada) 1999 Winnipeg	Volleyball	Men's tournament	2 Aug 1999	
Gold	Women's volleyball team: Andréa Teixeira Carolina Albuquerque Elisângela Oliveira Érika Coimbra Fofão Janina Conceição Karin Rodrigues Leila Barros Raquel Silva Renata Lúcia Virna Dias Walewska Oliveira	(Canada) 1999 Winnipeg	Volleyball	Women's tournament	1 Aug 1999	
Bronze	Women's water polo team: Ana Regina Alba Antonella Bertolucci Camila Pedrosa Cláudia Graner Cristiana Pinciroli Cristina Beer Mariana Fleury Mariana Roriz Mariana Secches Mariangela Corrêa Raquel Chiappini	(Canada) 1999 Winnipeg	Water polo	Women's tournament		

== See also ==
- List of Olympic medalists for Brazil
- Brazil at the Pan American Games
