= Brazil at the 1967 Pan American Games =

- IOC code: BRA
- NOC: Brazilian Olympic Committee
- Website: www.cob.org.br

in Winnipeg July 23 – August 6, 1967
- Competitors: 132 in 17 sports
- Flag bearer: Rodney Bell
- Medals Ranked 3rd: Gold 11 Silver 10 Bronze 5 Total 26

Pan American Games appearances (overview)
- 1951; 1955; 1959; 1963; 1967; 1971; 1975; 1979; 1983; 1987; 1991; 1995; 1999; 2003; 2007; 2011; 2015; 2019; 2023

Brazil competed at the 5th Pan American Games held in Winnipeg, Manitoba, Canada from July 23 to August 6, 1967.

== Medals ==
Medal	Name(s)	Sport	Event	Date	Ref
Bronze	Aída dos Santos	Athletics	Women's pentathlon	30 July 1967	
Silver	Nelson Prudêncio	Athletics	Men's triple jump	1 August 1967	
Gold	Women's basketball team: Angelina Bizarro Delcy Ellender Marques Elza Pacheco Jacy Azevedo Laís Silva Lucia Maria Borges Marlene José Bento Nadir Bazani Neusa Camargo Nilza Monte Garcia Norma Pinto de Oliveira Rosália Vasconcelos	Basketball	Women's tournament		
Silver	Luiz Fabre	Boxing	Men's middleweight (-75 kg)		
Silver	Nelson Pessoa	Equestrian	Jumping		
Gold	Antônio Simões; José Fernandez; Nelson Pessoa; Reny Ferreira	Equestrian	Jumping team		
Gold	Arthur Cramer	Fencing	Men's épée		
Silver	Arthur Cramer; Carlos Luiz Couto; Darío Amaral; José Maria Pereira	Fencing	Men's épée team		
Gold	Akira Ono	Judo	Men's half lightweight (-63 kg)		
Gold	Takeshi Miura	Judo	Men's lightweight (-70 kg)		
Silver	Lhofei Shiozawa	Judo	Men's middleweight (-80 kg)		
Bronze	Georges Mehdi	Judo	Men's open class		
Bronze	Cláudio Angeli; José Carlos Angeli; Sylvio de Souza	Rowing	Men's coxed pair-oared shells		
Gold	Jörg Bruder	Sailing	Finn class		
Silver	Burkhard Cordes; Reinaldo Conrad	Sailing	Flying Dutchman		
Gold	Carlos Henrique de Lorenzi; Nelson Piccolo	Sailing	Snipe class		
Silver	Fernão Dias Paes Leme; Mário Borges Jr. Renato Augusto da Matta	Sailing	Lightning class		
Gold	José Sylvio Fiolo	Swimming	Men's 200m breaststroke	29 July 1967	
Gold	José Sylvio Fiolo	Swimming	Men's 100m breaststroke	30 July 1967	
Bronze	Ilson Asturiano; João Costa Lima Neto; José Sylvio Fiolo; Waldyr Ramos	Swimming	Men's 4 × 100 m medley relay		
Gold	Thomaz Koch	Tennis	Men's singles		
Gold	José Edison Mandarino; Thomaz Koch	Tennis	Men's doubles		
Silver	Men's volleyball team: Antônio Carlos Moreno Arnaldo Jagle Carlos Albano Feitosa Décio de Azevedo Fernando Blaser Gerson Schuch Marco Antônio Volpi Mário Dunlop Mário Mariz Paulo Sevciuc Sérgio Pires Sobrinho Victor Barcellos Borges	Volleyball	Men's tournament		
Silver	Men's water polo team: Arnaldo Marsili Cláudio Lima Henrique Filellini Ivo Carotini João Gonçalves Filho Luiz Eduardo Lima Marcos Vargas da Costa Paulo Carotini Pedro Pinciroli Jr. Rodney Bell	Water polo	Men's tournament		
Silver	Koji Michi	Weightlifting	Men's middleweight (-75 kg)		
Bronze	Luiz de Almeida	Weightlifting	Men's middleweight (-75 kg)		

Medals by sport
Sport	1st place, gold medalist(s)	2nd place, silver medalist(s)	3rd place, bronze medalist(s)	Total
Sailing	2	2	0	4
Judo	2	1	1	4
Swimming	2	0	1	3
Tennis	2	0	0	2
Equestrian	1	1	0	2
Fencing	1	1	0	2
Basketball	1	0	0	1
Athletics	0	1	1	2
Weightlifting	0	1	1	2
Boxing	0	1	0	1
Volleyball	0	1	0	1
Waterpolo	0	1	0	1
Rowing	0	0	1	1
Total	11	10	5	26

== See also ==
- Brazil at the 1968 Summer Olympics
- List of Pan American medalists for Brazil
