= Basketball at the 1987 Pan American Games – Women's team rosters =

The following is a list of rosters for each nation that competed in the women's basketball tournament at the 1987 Pan American Games in Indianapolis.

== Key ==
Pos.	Position
C	Center
PF	Power Forward
SF	Small Forward
SG	Shooting Guard
PG	Point Guard

== Teams ==
=== Brazil ===
Brazil women's basketball team roster
Players
Coaches

Pos.	No.	Name	Age – Date of birth	Height	Club	Ctr.
G		Maria Angélica	21 – 10 January 1966	1.70 m (5 ft 7 in)
SG		Janeth Arcain	18 – 11 April 1969	1.80 m (5 ft 11 in)
C		Maria Bertolotti	21 – 30 April 1966	1.90 m (6 ft 3 in)
F		Vânia Hernandes	24 – 30 June 1963	1.78 m (5 ft 10 in)
G		Nádia Bento de Lima	21 – 30 July 1966	1.70 m (5 ft 7 in)
SG		Hortência Marcari	27 – 23 September 1959	1.75 m (5 ft 9 in)	Associação Desportiva Classista Minercal	(Brazil)
		Neusa Ribeiro	23 – 5 July 1964
PG		Paula Silva	25 – 11 March 1962	1.74 m (5 ft 9 in)
C		Marta Sobral	23 – 23 March 1964	1.90 m (6 ft 3 in)
PF		Ruth Roberta de Souza	18 – 3 October 1968	1.88 m (6 ft 2 in)
		Vanira Souza	–
SF		Vânia Teixeira	27 – 30 April 1960	1.75 m (5 ft 9 in)

Head coach

- (Brazil) Maria Helena Cardoso

Legend

- (C) Team captain
- Club – describes current club
- Age – describes age
  on 9 August 1987

=== Canada ===
Canada women's basketball team roster
Players
Coaches

Pos.	No.	Name	Age – Date of birth	Height	Club	Ctr.
F		Andrea Blackwell	24 – 23 November 1962	1.86 m (6 ft 1 in)
		Beth Cochran	23 – 11 June 1964		Winnipeg Wesmen	(Canada)
		Sandra Espeseth	24 – 28 March 1963
F		Janet Fowler	22 – 18 May 1965	1.83 m (6 ft 0 in)	Victoria Vikes	(Canada)
		Carol Hamilton	23 – 12 December 1963		Laurentian Voyageurs	(Canada)
G		Debbie Huband	30 – 5 September 1956	1.73 m (5 ft 8 in)
G		Karla Karch	22 – 26 August 1964	1.73 m (5 ft 8 in)	Victoria Vikes	(Canada)
F		Angela Orton	–	1.80 m (5 ft 11 in)
F		Anna Pendergast	26 – 26 June 1961	1.80 m (5 ft 11 in)
PG		Lynn Polson	25 – 19 April 1962	1.73 m (5 ft 8 in)
F		Bev Smith	27 – 4 April 1960	1.85 m (6 ft 1 in)	Ferrara Basket	(Italy)
F		Misty Thomas	23 – 1 July 1964	1.80 m (5 ft 11 in)

Head coach

- (Canada) Wayne Hussey

Legend

- (C) Team captain
- Club – describes current club
- Age – describes age
  on 9 August 1987

=== Colombia ===
Colombia women's basketball team roster
Players
Coaches

Pos.	No.	Name	Age – Date of birth	Height	Club	Ctr.
		María Arizala	–		Oklahoma City Stars	(United States)
		Beatriz Castaño	–
		Claudia Castillo	–
		Gloria Gómez	28 – 21 August 1958
		Elizabeth Hinestroza	–
		Norma Lozano	–
		Margoth Ocoró	–
		Sixta Ocoró	–
SG		Patricia Ordóñez	–	1.68 m (5 ft 6 in)	Oklahoma City Stars	(United States)
		María Elisabeth Rivas	–
		Margarita Segura	–
		Janeth Torijano	–	1.83 m (6 ft 0 in)	Oklahoma City Stars	(United States)

Legend

- (C) Team captain
- Club – describes current club
- Age – describes age
  on 9 August 1987

=== Cuba ===
Cuba women's basketball team roster
Players
Coaches

Pos.	No.	Name	Age – Date of birth	Height	Club	Ctr.
		Bárbara Bécquer	29 – 31 December 1957	1.83 m (6 ft 0 in)
C		Andrea Borrell	23 – 10 November 1963	1.90 m (6 ft 3 in)
F		Odalys Cala	25 – 8 February 1962	1.80 m (5 ft 11 in)
		Dania Cañizares	20 – 1 November 1966
		Juana Díaz	20 – 4 August 1967
		Olga Díaz	–
F		Dalia Henry	22 – 14 June 1965	1.81 m (5 ft 11 in)
		Ana Hernández	24 – 10 November 1962
		Regla Hernández	19 – 27 April 1968
F		María León	20 – 7 April 1967	1.80 m (5 ft 11 in)
G		María Moret	26 – 2 August 1961	1.73 m (5 ft 8 in)
		Beatriz Perdomo	24 – 21 April 1963

Legend

- (C) Team captain
- Club – describes current club
- Age – describes age
  on 9 August 1987

=== Mexico ===
Mexico women's basketball team roster
Players
Coaches

Pos.	No.	Name	Age – Date of birth	Height	Club	Ctr.
		Olivia Carrillo	23 – 20 September 1963	1.70 m (5 ft 7 in)
		Oralia Carrillo	–
		Katherine Eastman	–
		Rosario Gómez	–
		Elsa Hayashi	25 – 23 November 1961
		Laura Heredia	–
		Cristina Linares	–
		Graciela López	–
		Angélica Macías	–
		Elisabeth Marín	–
		Sofía Morfín	31 – 11 March 1956
		Mayra Reyes	–

Legend

- (C) Team captain
- Club – describes current club
- Age – describes age
  on 9 August 1987

=== Peru ===
Peru women's basketball team roster
Players
Coaches

Pos.	No.	Name	Age – Date of birth	Height	Club	Ctr.
		Cecilia Azangara	–
		Lourdes Borjas	–
		Marisa Cosío	28 – 16 May 1959	1.67 m (5 ft 6 in)
		Jessica Ezeta	–
		Guadalupe Garcés	31 – 3 May 1956
		Patricia Luna	22 – 24 March 1965	1.74 m (5 ft 9 in)
C		Katia Manzur	29 – 14 February 1958	1.85 m (6 ft 1 in)
		Jessica Marchig	–
		Mariella Picasso	32 – 20 April 1955
		Rose Marie Salini	–
		Mercedes Sangio	–
		Patricia Zegarra	–

Legend

- (C) Team captain
- Club – describes current club
- Age – describes age
  on 9 August 1987

=== United States ===
United States women's basketball team roster
Players
Coaches

Pos.	No.	Name	Age – Date of birth	Height	Club	Ctr.
F/C		Cindy Brown	22 – 16 March 1965	1.88 m (6 ft 2 in)	Sidis Ancona	(Italy)
G		Cynthia Cooper	24 – 14 April 1963	1.78 m (5 ft 10 in)	Basket Parma	(Italy)
F		Clarissa Davis	20 – 4 June 1967	1.85 m (6 ft 1 in)	Texas Longhorns	(United States)
C		Anne Donovan	25 – 1 November 1961	2.03 m (6 ft 8 in)	Chanson V-Magic	(Japan)
G/F		Teresa Edwards	23 – 14 July 1964	1.80 m (5 ft 11 in)	Pallacanestro Magenta	(Italy)
PG		Kamie Ethridge	23 – 21 April 1964	1.65 m (5 ft 5 in)
F/C		Jennifer Gillom	23 – 13 June 1964	1.91 m (6 ft 3 in)	Basket Femminile Milano	(Italy)
G		Fran Harris	22 – 12 March 1965	1.83 m (6 ft 0 in)
F		Andrea Lloyd-Curry	21 – 2 September 1965	1.88 m (6 ft 2 in)	Texas Longhorns	(United States)
PF		Katrina McClain	21 – 19 September 1965	1.85 m (6 ft 1 in)	Kyoto Petroleum	(Japan)
		Alisa Scott	–	1.75 m (5 ft 9 in)	Ole Miss Rebels	(United States)
F		Sue Wicks	20 – 26 November 1966	1.91 m (6 ft 3 in)	Rutgers Scarlet Knights	(United States)

Head coach

- (United States) Jody Conradt

Legend

- (C) Team captain
- Club – describes current club
- Age – describes age
  on 9 August 1987
