= Schuck =

Schuck is a surname. Notable people with the surname include:

- Alexander Schuck (born 1957), East German sprint canoeist
- Anett Schuck (born 1970), German canoeist
- Arthur A. Schuck (1895–1963), Chief Scout Executive
- Bill Schuck, American politician
- Empress Schuck (born 1993), Filipino actress
- Ernest F. Schuck (1929–2009), American politician
- Gerson Schuck (born 1946), Brazilian volleyball player
- Henrik Schück (1855–1947), Swedish literary historian, university professor and writer
- John Schuck (born 1940), American actor
- Lorraine Schuck, Filipino beauty pageant winner
- Marina Schuck, German sprint canoeist
- Princess Schuck (born 1987), Filipino actress
- Robert D. Schuck (1917–2003), American politician
- Tanja Schuck, German sprint canoeist
- Walter Schuck (1920–2015), German World War II flying ace

== See also ==
- Shuck (disambiguation)
