= Ruth Souza =

Ruth Souza may refer to:

- Ruth Roberta de Souza, Brazilian basketball player
- Ruth de Souza Brazilian actress
