= List of Pan American medalists for Brazil =

This is a full list of all Brazilian medalists at the Pan American Games.

== List of medalists ==
- List of Pan American medalists for Brazil (before 2000)
- List of Pan American medalists for Brazil (2000–present)

== Stripped medals ==
Medal	Name(s)	Games	Sport	Event	Motive	Ref
Gold	Rebeca Gusmão	(Brazil) 2007 Rio de Janeiro	Swimming	Women's 50 m freestyle	Rebeca Gusmão doping for exogenous testosterone	
Gold	Rebeca Gusmão	(Brazil) 2007 Rio de Janeiro	Swimming	Women's 100 m freestyle	Rebeca Gusmão doping for exogenous testosterone	
Silver	Flávia Delaroli; Monique Ferreira; Rebeca Gusmão; Tatiana Lemos; Manuella Lyrio (heats)	(Brazil) 2007 Rio de Janeiro	Swimming	Women's 4 × 100 m freestyle relay	Rebeca Gusmão doping for exogenous testosterone	
Bronze	Daiene Dias; Fabíola Molina; Rebeca Gusmão; Tatiane Sakemi; Fernanda Alvarenga (heats); Flávia Delaroli (heats); Gabriella Silva (heats); Mariana Katsuno (heats)	(Brazil) 2007 Rio de Janeiro	Swimming	Women's 4 × 100 m medley relay	Rebeca Gusmão doping for exogenous testosterone	
Bronze	Fabrício Mafra	(Brazil) 2007 Rio de Janeiro	Weightlifting	Men's heavyweight (-105 kg)	Doping for exogenous testosterone	
Silver	Andressa de Morais	(Peru) 2019 Lima	Athletics	Women's discus throw	Tested positive to the prohibited substance SARM S22	
Gold	Rafaela Silva	(Peru) 2019 Lima	Judo	Women's lightweight (-57 kg)	Tested positive to the prohibited substance fenoterol	

== Multiple medalists ==
=== Total medals ===
Athletes with or more than eight medals conquered:

No.	Athlete	Sport	Gender	Gold	Silver	Bronze	Total
1	Thiago Pereira	Swimming	M	15	4	4	23
2	Gustavo Borges	Swimming	M	8	8	3	19
3	Hugo Hoyama	Table tennis	M	10	1	4	15
4	Cláudio Kano	Table tennis	M	7	3	2	12
5	Sebastián Cuattrin	Canoeing	M	1	6	4	11
6	Djan Madruga	Swimming	M	0	5	6	11
7	Fernando Scherer	Swimming	M	7	2	1	10
8	Leonardo de Deus	Swimming	M	4	3	3	10
9	Cláudio Biekarck	Sailing	M	1	4	5	10
10	Larissa Oliveira	Swimming	F	1	3	6	10
11	Flávia Saraiva	Gymnastics	F	0	4	6	10
11	Daniele Hypólito	Gymnastics	F	0	3	7	10
12	Marcelo Chierighini	Swimming	M	6	2	1	9
13	Kaio de Almeida	Swimming	M	4	3	2	9
14	Etiene Medeiros	Swimming	F	2	3	4	9
15	Gunnar Ficker	Sailing	M	1	3	5	9
15	Manuella Lyrio	Swimming	F	1	3	5	9
17	César Cielo Filho	Swimming	M	7	1	0	8
18	Hugo Calderano	Table tennis	M	6	1	1	8
19	Diego Hypólito	Gymnastics	M	5	3	0	8
20	Gustavo Tsuboi	Table tennis	M	4	3	1	8
21	Thiago Monteiro	Table tennis	M	4	1	3	8
22	Arthur Nory Mariano	Gymnastics	M	2	5	1	8
23	Bruna Takahashi	Table tennis	F	0	5	3	8
24	Joanna Maranhão	Swimming	F	0	3	5	8
25	Durval Guimarães	Shooting	M	0	2	6	8

=== Most gold medals ===
Athletes with four or more gold medals won:

No.	Athlete	Sport	Gender	Gold	Silver	Bronze	Total
1	Thiago Pereira	Swimming	M	15	4	4	23
2	Hugo Hoyama	Table tennis	M	10	1	4	15
3	Gustavo Borges	Swimming	M	8	8	3	19
4	Cláudio Kano	Table tennis	M	7	3	2	12
5	Fernando Scherer	Swimming	M	7	2	1	10
6	César Cielo Filho	Swimming	M	7	1	0	8
7	Marcelo Chierighini	Swimming	M	6	2	1	9
8	Hugo Calderano	Table tennis	M	6	1	1	8
9	Luisa Matsuo	Gymnastics	F	6	0	0	6
10	Diego Hypólito	Gymnastics	M	5	3	0	8
11	Bruno Fratus	Swimming	M	5	2	0	7
12	Ana Sátila	Canoeing	F	5	1	0	6
12	Dayane Amaral	Gymnastics	F	5	1	0	6
12	Nicolas Oliveira	Swimming	M	5	1	0	6
15	Guilherme Costa	Swimming	M	5	0	0	5
16	Leonardo de Deus	Swimming	M	4	3	3	10
17	Kaio de Almeida	Swimming	M	4	3	2	9
18	Gustavo Tsuboi	Table tennis	M	4	3	1	8
19	Breno Correia	Swimming	M	4	3	0	7
20	Thiago Monteiro	Table tennis	M	4	1	3	8
21	Francisco Barretto Jr.	Gymnastics	M	4	1	0	5
21	João de Lucca	Swimming	M	4	1	0	5
21	Ricardo Winicki	Sailing	M	4	1	0	5
24	Nicole Pircio	Gymnastics	F	4	0	2	6
25	Dayane Camilo	Gymnastics	F	4	0	1	5
26	Alexandra do Nascimento	Handball	F	4	0	0	4
26	Ana Paula Belo	Handball	F	4	0	0	4
26	Daniela Piedade	Handball	F	4	0	0	4
26	Felipe França	Swimming	M	4	0	0	4
26	João Carlos de Oliveira	Athletics	M	4	0	0	4
26	Lucélia Ribeiro	Karate	F	4	0	0	4
26	Marcel Stürmer	Roller sports	M	4	0	0	4

=== More than one sport ===
Athletes who won medals in more than one type of sport:

No.	Athlete	Sport	Gender	Gold	Silver	Bronze	Total
1	Vera Trezoitko	Athletics	F	0	0	1	4
1	Vera Trezoitko	Volleyball	F	2	0	1	4
2	João Gonçalves Filho	Swimming	M	0	1	0	4
2	João Gonçalves Filho	Water polo	M	1	1	1	4
3	Zilda Ulbrich	Basketball	F	0	1	1	4
3	Zilda Ulbrich	Volleyball	F	1	0	1	4
4	Isaura Marli Alvares	Basketball	F	0	1	1	3
4	Isaura Marli Alvares	Volleyball	F	0	0	1	3
5	Aloysio Alves Borges	Fencing	M	0	1	0	2
5	Aloysio Alves Borges	Modern pentathlon	M	0	1	0	2

== See also ==
- List of Olympic medalists for Brazil
- Brazil at the Pan American Games
