= Shuckle =

Shuckle may refer to:

- Shuckling – swaying during Jewish prayer
- Shuckle (Pokémon), a fictional species in the Pokémon franchise

== See also ==
- Shuck (disambiguation)
