= Shuck =

Shuck may refer to:

- The chaff sections of grains
- Black Shuck, mythical dog
- Shuckin' and jivin'
- "Shuck", a song by Purity Ring from their debut album, Shrines (2012)

== People ==
- Glenn Shuck, American academic
- Henrietta Hall Shuck, American missionary
- J. B. Shuck, baseball player
- Jim Shuck, American football player
- Ryan Shuck, guitarist
- William E. Shuck, Jr., Medal of Honor recipient

== See also ==
- Schuck, a surname
- Shuckle (disambiguation)
