= Swimming at the 1967 Pan American Games – Men's 100 metre breaststroke =

Men's 100 metre breaststroke at the 1967 Pan American Games
- Venue: Pan Am Pool
- Dates: July 30 (preliminaries and finals)
- Competitors: from - nations

Medalists
Gold medal	José Fiolo	Brazil
Silver medal	Russell Webb	United States
Bronze medal	Ken Merten	United States

The men's 100 metre breaststroke competition of the swimming events at the 1967 Pan American Games took place on 30 July at the Pan Am Pool. It was the first appearance of this event in the Pan American Games.

This race consisted of two lengths of the pool, both lengths being in breaststroke.

== Results ==
All times are in minutes and seconds.

KEY:	q	Fastest non-qualifiers	Q	Qualified	GR	Games record	NR	National record	PB	Personal best	SB	Seasonal best

=== Final ===
The final was held on July 30.

Rank	Name	Nationality	Time	Notes
1st place, gold medalist(s)	José Fiolo	Brazil	1:07.5	GR
2nd place, silver medalist(s)	Russell Webb	United States	1:09.1	
3rd place, bronze medalist(s)	Ken Merten	United States	1:09.3	
4	William Mahony	Canada	1:10.8	
5	Paul Lottman	Canada	1:11.9	
6	Osvaldo Borretto	Argentina	1:12.0	
7	Felipe Muñoz	Mexico	1:12.8	
8	Rafael Hernández	-	1:14.8	
