= Wilson Scheidemantel =

Brazilian sports shooter

Personal information
- Born: 29 October 1949 (age 76) Ibirama, Brazil

Sport
- Sport: Sports shooting
Medal record
Representing Brazil
Pan American Games
Silver medal – second place	1979 San Juan	10m air pistol team
Silver medal – second place	1991 Havana	25m air pistol team
Bronze medal – third place	1983 Caracas	50m free pistol team
Bronze medal – third place	1991 Havana	10m air pistol
Bronze medal – third place	1991 Havana	10m air pistol team

Wilson Scheidemantel (born 29 October 1949) is a Brazilian sports shooter. He competed in two events at the 1992 Summer Olympics.
