= Lula Barbosa =

Brazilian beach volleyball player (born 1970)

Personal information
- Full name: Luís Antônio Barbosa da Silva
- Born: March 13, 1970 (age 56); Recife, Brazil
- Height: 6 ft 2 in (1.88 m)

Beach volleyball information
Teammate
Adriano Garrido
Honours
Men's beach volleyball
Representing Brazil
Pan American Games
| Silver medal – second place | 1999 Winnipeg | Beach |

Lula Barbosa da Silva (born March 13, 1970, in Recife) is a former beach volleyball player from Brazil who won the silver medal in the men's beach team competition at the 1999 Pan American Games in Winnipeg, Manitoba, Canada, partnering with Adriano Garrido.
