= Sylvio Carvalho =

Brazilian sports shooter (born 1956)

Personal information
- Born: 1 April 1956 (age 69); Rio de Janeiro, Brazil

Sport
- Sport: Sports shooting

Sylvio Carvalho (born 1 April 1956) is a Brazilian sports shooter. He competed at the 1980 Summer Olympics and the 1984 Summer Olympics.
