= Adriano Garrido =

Brazilian beach volleyball player (born 1972)

Personal information
- Full name: Francismar Adriano Dias Garrido
- Born: November 30, 1972 (age 53); Recife, Brazil
- Height: 6 ft 7 in (201 cm)

Beach volleyball information
Teammate
Lula Barbosa
Honours
Men's beach volleyball
Representing Brazil
Pan American Games
| Silver medal – second place | 1999 Winnipeg | Beach |

Francismar Adriano Dias Garrido (born November 30, 1972) is a Brazilian male former beach volleyball player who won the silver medal in the men's beach team competition at the 1999 Pan American Games in Winnipeg, Manitoba, Canada, partnering with Lula Barbosa.
