= Athletics at the 1967 Pan American Games – Women's pentathlon =

Women's pentathlon at the Pan American Games

The women's pentathlon event at the 1967 Pan American Games was held in Winnipeg on 29 and 30 July. It was the first time that women's combined events were held at the Games.

== Results ==
The highest mark recorded in each event is highlighted in yellow

Rank	Athlete	Nationality	100m H	SP	HJ	LJ	200m	Points	Notes
1st place, gold medalist(s)	Pat Winslow	United States	11.6	13.36	1.64	5.85	24.0	4860	
2nd place, silver medalist(s)	Jenny Meldrum	Canada	11.3	12.92	1.57	5.80	24.8	4724	
3rd place, bronze medalist(s)	Aída dos Santos	Brazil	11.8	11.83	1.64	5.34	24.9	4531	
4	Gisela Vidal	Venezuela	12.0	10.85	1.50	5.84	25.0	4385	
5	Leslie Shonk	Canada	11.4	9.47	1.60	5.16	24.9	4329	
6	Janet Johnson	United States	11.7	11.44	1.38	5.19	24.3	4241	
7	Daisy Echevarría	Cuba	11.5	8.07	1.36	5.51	25.1	3995	
8	Elvira Quiñónez	Ecuador	12.7	8.76	1.40	4.29	28.8	3336	
