= Athletics at the 1967 Pan American Games – Men's triple jump =

Men's triple jump at the Pan American Games

The men's triple jump event at the 1967 Pan American Games was held in Winnipeg on 1 August.

== Results ==
Rank	Name	Nationality	Result	Notes
1st place, gold medalist(s)	Charles Craig	United States	16.54	
2nd place, silver medalist(s)	Nelson Prudêncio	Brazil	16.45	
3rd place, bronze medalist(s)	José Hernández	Cuba	15.95	
4	Darrell Horn	United States	15.85	
5	Jorge Toro	Puerto Rico	15.48	
6	Bill Greenough	Canada	15.43	
7	Ian Arnold	Canada	15.28	
8	Mahoney Samuels	Jamaica	15.21	
9	M. Johnson	Bahamas	15.02	
10	Tim Barrett	Bahamas	14.40	
