= Mario Buckup =

Brazilian sailor

Personal information
- Born: 11 November 1947 (age 77); São Paulo, Brazil

Sport
- Sport: Sailing

Mario Buckup (born 11 November 1947) is a Brazilian sailor. He competed in the Tempest event at the 1972 Summer Olympics.
