= Beach volleyball at the 1999 Pan American Games =

- Dates: 29 July – 4 August 1999
- Competitors: 24

The beach volleyball tournaments at the 1999 Pan American Games were held 29 July – 4 August 1999 in Winnipeg, Canada.

== Men's tournament ==
Rank	Final ranking
Gold medal	Jody Holden and Conrad Leinemann (CAN)
Silver medal	Lula Barbosa and Adriano Garrido (BRA)
Bronze medal	Roberto Lopes and Franco Neto (BRA)
4.	Ihosvany Chambers and Lazaro Milian Carvajal (CUB)
5.	Juan Rodriguez Ibarra and Joel Sotelo (MEX)
5.	Willie de Jesus and Amaury Velasco (PUR)
7.	Brian Gatzke and Dan Lewis (CAN)
7.	Scott Davenport and Collin Smith (USA)
7.	Peter Goers and Brad Torsone (USA)
10.	Zlatko Piskulich and Alexánder Villegas (CRC)
10.	Daniel Ignasio Sanchez and Walter Anibal Sanchez (HON)
10.	Aegidio Juliana and Otmar Kalmez (AHO)

== Women's tournament ==
Rank	Final ranking
Gold medal	Shelda Bede and Adriana Behar (BRA)
Silver medal	Marsha Miller and Jenny Pavley (USA)
Bronze medal	Laura Almaral and Mayra Huerta (MEX)
4.	Barb Broen Ouellette and Christine Pack (CAN)
5.	Adriana Bento and Monica Paludo (BRA)
5.	Carrie Dodd and Liz Pagano (USA)
7.	Noemi Blanco and Mayra Ferrer del Valle (CUB)
7.	Tamara Larrea and Maru Quevedo (CUB)
7.	Patricia Castro and Sonia Pino (HON)
10.	Jennifer Harkness and Sue Lesage (CAN)
10.	Ana Aquino and Ligia Salazar (ESA)
10.	Yadeizi Abreu and Nelitza Zambrano (VEN)

=== Medal table ===
* Host nation (Canada)

Rank	Nation	Gold	Silver	Bronze	Total
1	Brazil	1	1	1	3
2	Canada	1	0	0	1
3	United States	0	1	0	1
4	Mexico	0	0	1	1
Totals (4 entries)		2	2	2	6

== See also ==
- Volleyball at the 1999 Pan American Games
