= Emilson Dantas =

Brazilian weightlifter

Personal information
- Nationality: Brazilian
- Born: 19 March 1964 (age 61)

Sport
- Sport: Weightlifting

Emilson Dantas (born 19 March 1964) is a Brazilian weightlifter. He competed at the 1988 Summer Olympics, the 1992 Summer Olympics and the 1996 Summer Olympics.
