= Cláudio Brito =

Brazilian handball player (born 1965)

Personal information
- Born: 5 April 1965 Campina Grande, Brazil
- Died: 17 May 2005 (aged 40) Maringá, Brazil

Sport
- Sport: Handball

Cláudio Oliveira Brito (5 April 1965 – 17 May 2005) was a Brazilian former handball player. He competed in the men's tournament at the 1992 Summer Olympics.
Brito died in a traffic accident between two buses in the interior of the Paraná District, where six other people died, including two young athletes from the handball team of which Brito was the coach: Chapecó (SC), and who were traveling to compete in the Brazilian championship, in Maringá, Paraná.
