= Edson Peri =

Brazilian water polo player (1928–2025)

Personal information
- Born: 5 June 1928; Rio de Janeiro, Brazil
- Died: 2 August 2025 (aged 97)

Sport
- Sport: Water polo

Edson Peri (5 June 1928 – 2 August 2025) was a Brazilian water polo player. He competed in the men's tournament at the 1952 Summer Olympics.

Peri died on 2 August 2025, at the age of 97.
