= Rosana de Aleluia =

Brazilian handball player (born 1970)

Personal information
- Full name: Rosana Ferreira de Aleluia
- Born: 2 January 1970 (age 56) Salvador, Brazil
- Height: 1.79 m (5 ft 10 in)

Sport
- Sport: Handball

Rosana Ferreira de Aleluia (born 2 January 1970) is a Brazilian former handball player. She competed in the women's tournament at the 2000 Summer Olympics.
