= Swimming at the 1967 Pan American Games – Men's 200 metre breaststroke =

Men's 200-metre breaststroke at the 1967 Pan American Games
- Venue: Pan Am Pool
- Dates: July 29 (preliminaries and finals)
- Competitors: from - nations

Medalists
Gold medal	José Fiolo	Brazil
Silver medal	Robert Monsen	United States
Bronze medal	Ken Merten	United States

The men's 200-metre breaststroke competition of the swimming events at the 1967 Pan American Games took place on 29 July at the Pan Am Pool. The last Pan American Games champion was Chet Jastremski of US.

This race consisted of four lengths of the pool, all in breaststroke.

== Results ==
All times are in minutes and seconds.

KEY:	q	Fastest non-qualifiers	Q	Qualified	GR	Games record	NR	National record	PB	Personal best	SB	Seasonal best

=== Final ===
The final was held on July 29.

Rank	Name	Nationality	Time	Notes
1st place, gold medalist(s)	José Fiolo	Brazil	2:30.4	GR
2nd place, silver medalist(s)	Robert Monsen	United States	2:31.0	
3rd place, bronze medalist(s)	Ken Merten	United States	2:34.2	
4	William Mahony	Canada	2:35.3	
5	Robert Soobdart	Canada	2:36.9	
6	Felipe Muñoz	Mexico	2:36.9	
7	Osvaldo Boreto	Argentina	2:43.8	
8	Luís Acosta	-	2:44.5	
