= Luiz Fabre =

Brazilian boxer (born 1948)

Personal information
- Full name: Luiz Carlos Fabre
- Born: 14 February 1948 (age 78) São Paulo, Brazil

Sport
- Sport: Boxing
- Weight class: Middleweight (-75 kg)
Medal record
Men's boxing
Representing Brazil
Pan American Games
Silver medal – second place	1967 Winnipeg	Middleweight

Luiz Carlos Fabre (born 14 February 1948) is a Brazilian boxer. He competed in the men's light middleweight event at the 1964 Summer Olympics.
