= Carlos Eduardo Albano Feitosa =

Brazilian volleyball player

Feitosa

Personal information
- Full name: Carlos Eduardo Albano Feitosa
- Born: 8 June 1941; Rondônia
- Died: 29 July 2007 (aged 66)
- Height: 1.80 m (5 ft 11 in)

Volleyball information
- Number: 5

National team
1962–1969	Brazil
Honours
Men's volleyball
Representing Brazil
Pan American Games
Gold medal – first place	1963 São Paulo	Team
Silver medal – second place	1967 Winnipeg	Team

Carlos Eduardo Albano Feitosa (Note: This name uses Portuguese naming customs: the first or maternal family name is Albano and the second or paternal family name is Feitosa.) (8 June 1941 – 29 July 2007), known as Feitosa, was a Brazilian volleyball player who competed in the 1964 Summer Olympics in Tokyo and the 1968 Summer Olympics in Mexico City. He played on the teams that won the gold medal at the 1963 Pan American Games and the silver medal at the 1967 Pan American Games. He was born in Rondônia, Brazil.
