= Durval Guimarães =

Brazilian sports shooter (1935–2022)

Personal information
- Full name: Durval Ferreira Guimarães
- Born: 14 July 1935 Santos, São Paulo, Brazil
- Died: 23 July 2022 (aged 87) São Paulo, Brazil

Sport
- Sport: Sports shooting

Durval Guimarães (14 July 1935 – 23 July 2022) was a Brazilian sport shooter who competed in the 1968 Summer Olympics, the 1972 Summer Olympics, the 1976 Summer Olympics, the 1980 Summer Olympics and the 1984 Summer Olympics, and several editions of the Pan American Games.

Guimarães died at the age of 87, on 23 July 2022.

== See also ==
- List of athletes with the most appearances at Olympic Games
