= Antônio Carlos Moreno =

Brazilian volleyball player

Personal information
- Full name: Antônio Carlos Moreno
- Born: 11 June 1948 (age 78); Santo André, São Paulo, Brazil
- Height: 1.92 m (6 ft 3 1/2 in)

Volleyball information
- Position: Outside hitter
- Number: 8 (1968); 5 (1972–1980)

National team
1967–1980	Brazil
Honours
Men's volleyball
Representing Brazil
Pan American Games
Silver medal – second place	1967 Winnipeg	Team
Silver medal – second place	1975 Mexico City	Team
Silver medal – second place	1979 Caguas	Team
Bronze medal – third place	1971 Cali	Team

Antônio Carlos Moreno (born 11 June 1948) is a Brazilian former volleyball player and four-time Olympian. Moreno competed in the 1968, 1972, 1976, and the 1980 Summer Olympics. He was the captain of the Brazilian team in all of his four Olympic appearances. He was an outside hitter.

== Personal life ==
Moreno's son, Carlos, was a setter for the Brigham Young University (BYU) volleyball team. In 2004, Carlos led BYU to the NCAA Championship title and was selected as the AVCA National Player of the Year.
