= Antônio Simões =

Brazilian equestrian

Personal information
- Born: 10 February 1941 (age 85) Rio de Janeiro, Brazil

Sport
- Sport: Equestrian
Medal record
Equestrian
Representing Brazil
Pan American Games
Gold medal – first place	1967 Winnipeg	Team jumping

Antônio Simões (born 10 February 1941) is a Brazilian equestrian. He competed in the individual jumping event at the 1972 Summer Olympics.
