= Décio de Azevedo =

Brazilian volleyball player

Personal information
- Full name: Décio Viotti de Azevedo
- Born: 12 October 1939 (age 87); Belo Horizonte, Minas Gerais, Brazil
- Height: 1.84 m (6 ft 0 in)

Volleyball information
- Number: 9

National team
1959–1968	Brazil
Medal record
Men's volleyball
Representing Brazil
Pan American Games
Gold medal – first place	1963 São Paulo	Team
Silver medal – second place	1959 Chicago	Team
Silver medal – second place	1967 Winnipeg	Team

Décio Viotti de Azevedo (born 12 October 1939) is a Brazilian former volleyball player who competed in the 1964 Summer Olympics in Tokyo and the 1968 Summer Olympics in Mexico City. He played on the teams that won the gold medal at the 1963 Pan American Games and silver medals at the 1959 and 1967 Pan American Games. He was born in Belo Horizonte, Minas Gerais, Brazil.
