= Nádia Bento de Lima =

Brazilian basketball player (born 1966)

Personal information
- Born: 30 July 1966 (age 58); São Paulo, Brazil

Sport
- Sport: Basketball

Nádia Bento de Lima (born 30 July 1966) is a Brazilian basketball player. She competed in the women's tournament at the 1992 Summer Olympics.
