= Arthur Ribeiro =

Brazilian fencer (born 1942)

Personal information
- Born: 21 March 1942 (age 84)

Sport
- Sport: Fencing

Arthur Ribeiro (born 21 March 1942) is a Brazilian fencer. He competed in the individual and team épée events at the 1968 Summer Olympics and the individual épée at the 1976 Summer Olympics.
