= Paulo Carotini =

Brazilian water polo player (1945–2022)

Personal information
- Full name: Paulo Kesselring Carotini
- Nickname: Polé
- Born: 10 September 1945 São Paulo, Brazil
- Died: 10 February 2022 (aged 76)

Sport
- Country: Brazil
- Sport: Water polo
Medal record
Men's water polo
Representing Brazil
Pan American Games
Gold medal – first place	1963 São Paulo	Team competition
Silver medal – second place	1967 Winnipeg	Team competition
Summer Universiade
Bronze medal – third place	1963 Porto Alegre	Team competition
South American Aquatics Championships
Gold medal – first place	1962 Buenos Aires	Team competition

Paulo Kesselring Carotini (Note: This name uses Portuguese naming customs: the first or maternal family name is Kesselring and the second or paternal family name is Carotini.) (10 September 1945 – 10 February 2022), also known as Polé, was a Brazilian water polo player. He competed in the men's tournament at the 1964 Summer Olympics.

Carotini died on 10 February 2022, at the age of 76. His brother is Ivo Carotini.
