= José Maria Pereira =

Brazilian fencer (1932–2024)

Personal information
- Born: 9 October 1932 Rio Grande do Sul, Brazil
- Died: 22 February 2024 (aged 91)

Sport
- Sport: Fencing

José Maria Pereira (9 October 1932 – 22 February 2024) was a Brazilian fencer. He competed in the team épée event at the 1968 Summer Olympics. Pereira died on 22 February 2024, at the age of 91.
