= Cláudio Lima =

Brazilian water polo player

Personal information
- Born: 7 June 1948 (age 76); Rio Grande do Sul, Brazil

Sport
- Sport: Water polo

Cláudio Lima (born 7 June 1948) is a Brazilian water polo player. He competed in the men's tournament at the 1968 Summer Olympics.
