= Pedro Pinciroli Júnior =

Brazilian water polo player

Personal information
- Born: 16 December 1943 (age 81); São Paulo, Brazil

Sport
- Sport: Water polo

Pedro Pinciroli Júnior (born 16 December 1943) is a Brazilian water polo player. He competed at the 1964 Summer Olympics and the 1968 Summer Olympics.
