= Henrique Filellini =

Brazilian water polo player (1939–2025)

Personal information
- Born: 18 July 1939; São Paulo, Brazil
- Died: 30 August 2025 (aged 86); São Paulo, Brazil

Sport
- Sport: Water polo

Henrique Filellini (18 July 1939 – 30 August 2025) was a Brazilian water polo player. He competed in the men's tournament at the 1968 Summer Olympics.

Filellini died on 30 August 2025, at the age of 86.
