= Paulo Sevciuc =

Brazilian volleyball player (born 1943)

Personal information
- Born: 27 November 1943 (age 82); São Paulo, Brazil
- Height: 1.84 m (6 ft 1/2 in)

Volleyball information
- Position: Setter
- Number: 4

National team
1967–1972	Brazil
Medal record
Men's volleyball
Representing Brazil
Pan American Games
Silver medal – second place	1967 Winnipeg	Team

Paulo Sevciuc (born 27 November 1943) is a Brazilian former volleyball player who competed in the 1972 Summer Olympics in Munich. He played on the team that won the silver medal at the 1967 Pan American Games in Winnipeg.
