= Maria José Bertolotti =

Brazilian basketball player (born 1966)

Personal information
- Born: 30 April 1966 (age 59); São Paulo, Brazil

Sport
- Sport: Basketball

Maria José Bertolotti (born 30 April 1966), sometimes known as just Zézé is a Brazilian basketball player. She competed in the women's tournament at the 1992 Summer Olympics.
