= Victor Barcellos Borges =

Brazilian Olympic volleyball player (1942–2009)

Victor Barcellos
Personal information
- Full name: Victor Mário Barcellos Borges
- Born: 26 June 1942 Rio de Janeiro, Brazil
- Died: 5 December 2009 (aged 67)
- Height: 1.77 m (5 ft 10 in)

Volleyball information
- Number: 10

National team
- Years: Team
- 1963–1968: Brazil
Medal record
Men's volleyball
Representing Brazil
Pan American Games
Gold medal – first place	1963 São Paulo	Team
Silver medal – second place	1967 Winnipeg	Team

Victor Mário Barcellos Borges (Note: This name uses Portuguese naming customs: the first or maternal family name is Barcellos and the second or paternal family name is Borges.) (26 June 1942 – 5 December 2009) was a Brazilian volleyball player who competed in the 1964 Summer Olympics in Tokyo and 1968 Summer Olympics in Mexico City. He played on the teams that won a gold medal at the 1963 Pan American Games and a silver medal at the 1967 Pan American Games. He was born in Rio de Janeiro, Brazil.
