= Rodney Bell (water polo) =

Brazilian water polo player

Personal information
- Born: 6 November 1936 (age 88); São Paulo, Brazil

Sport
- Sport: Water polo

Rodney Bell (born 6 November 1936) is a Brazilian water polo player. He competed in the men's tournament at the 1964 Summer Olympics.
