= Darío Amaral =

Brazilian fencer (born 1932)

Personal information
- Born: 23 May 1932 (age 94) São Paulo, Brazil

Sport
- Sport: Fencing

Darío Amaral (born 23 May 1932) is a Brazilian fencer. He competed in the individual and team épée events at the 1952 and 1968 Summer Olympics.
