= Marco Antônio Volpi =

Brazilian volleyball player

Personal information
- Full name: Marco Antônio Volpi
- Born: 1 July 1943 (age 83); Porto Alegre, Brazil
- Height: 1.87 m (6 ft 2 in)

Volleyball information
- Number: 6

National team
1962–1968	Brazil
Honours
Men's volleyball
Representing Brazil
Pan American Games
Gold medal – first place	1963 São Paulo	Team
Silver medal – second place	1967 Winnipeg	Team

Marco Antônio Volpi (born 1 July 1943) is a Brazilian former volleyball player who competed in the 1964 Summer Olympics in Tokyo and the 1968 Summer Olympics in Mexico City. He played on the teams that won the gold medal at the 1963 Pan American Games and the silver medal at the 1967 Pan American Games. He was born in Porto Alegre, Rio Grande do Sul, Brazil.
