= Vânia Hernandes =

Brazilian basketball player (born 1963)

Personal information
- Born: 30 June 1963 (age 63) São Paulo, Brazil

Sport
- Sport: Basketball

Vânia Hernandes (born 30 June 1963) is a Brazilian basketball player. She competed in the women's tournament at the 1992 Summer Olympics.
