= Mário Dunlop =

Brazilian volleyball player

Mário Stiebler Dunlop

Personal information
- Full name: Mário Stiebler Dunlop
- Born: 14 January 1946 (age 80); Rio de Janeiro, Brazil
- Height: 1.90 m (6 ft 3 in)

Volleyball information
- Number: 7

National team
1967–1968, 1977	Brazil
Honours
Men's volleyball
Representing Brazil
Pan American Games
Silver medal – second place	1967 Winnipeg	Team

Mário Stiebler Dunlop (born 14 January 1946) is a Brazilian former volleyball player who competed in the 1968 Summer Olympics in Mexico City. He played on the team that won the silver medal at the 1967 Pan American Games in Winnipeg. He was born in Rio de Janeiro, Brazil.
