= José Fernandez (equestrian) =

Brazilian equestrian (born 1947)

Personal information
- Born: 7 July 1947 São Paulo, Brazil
- Died: 12 January 2002 (aged 54)

Sport
- Sport: Equestrian
Medal record
Equestrian
Representing Brazil
Pan American Games
Gold medal – first place	1967 Winnipeg	Team jumping

José Roberto Reynoso Fernandez (7 July 1947 – 12 January 2002) was a Brazilian equestrian. He competed in two events at the 1968 Summer Olympics.
