= Ivo Carotini =

Brazilian water polo player

Personal information
- Full name: Ivo Kesselring Carotini
- Born: 16 February 1942 (age 84) São Paulo, Brazil
- Height: 178 cm (5 ft 10 in)
- Weight: 76 kg (168 lb)

Sport
- Country: Brazil
- Sport: Water polo
Medal record
Men's water polo
Representing Brazil
Pan American Games
Gold medal – first place	1963 São Paulo	Team competition
Silver medal – second place	1967 Winnipeg	Team competition
Summer Universiade
Bronze medal – third place	1963 Porto Alegre	Team competition

Ivo Kesselring Carotini (Note: This name uses Portuguese naming customs: the first or maternal family name is Kesselring and the second or paternal family name is Carotini.) (born 16 February 1942) is a Brazilian water polo player. He competed at the 1964 Summer Olympics and the 1968 Summer Olympics.

His brother was Paulo Carotini.
