= Ruth Roberta de Souza =

Brazilian basketball player (1968–2021)

Personal information
- Born: 3 October 1968 Três Lagoas, Mato Grosso do Sul, Brazil
- Died: 13 April 2021 (aged 52) Três Lagoas, Mato Grosso do Sul, Brazil

Sport
- Sport: Basketball
Medal record
Women's basketball
Representing Brazil
World Cup
Gold medal – first place	1994 Australia	Team
Pan American Games
Gold medal – first place	1991 Havana	Team
Silver medal – second place	1987 Indianapolis	Team

Ruth Roberta de Souza (3 October 1968 – 13 April 2021) was a Brazilian basketball player. She competed in the women's tournament at the 1992 Summer Olympics. Souza died in Três Lagoas on 13 April 2021, at the age of 52, due to COVID-19, after she had been hospitalized in the intensive care unit for two weeks.
