= Gerson Schuch =

Brazilian volleyball player

Gérson Albino Schuch

Personal information
- Full name: Gérson Albino Schuch
- Born: 22 January 1946 (age 80); Rio Grande do Sul, Brazil
- Height: 1.86 m (6 ft 1 in)

Volleyball information
- Number: 4

National team
1967–1969, 1973	Brazil
Honours
Men's volleyball
Representing Brazil
Pan American Games
Silver medal – second place	1967 Winnipeg	Team

Gérson Albino Schuch (born 22 January 1946) is a Brazilian former volleyball player who competed in the 1968 Summer Olympics in Mexico City. He played on the team that won the silver medal at the 1967 Pan American Games in Winnipeg. He was born in Rio Grande do Sul, Brazil.
