= Brazil at the 1995 Pan American Games =

- IOC code: BRA
- NOC: Brazilian Olympic Committee
- Website: www.cob.org.br

in Mar del Plata 11–26 March 1995
- Flag bearer: Torben Grael
- Medals Ranked 6th: Gold 18 Silver 27 Bronze 38 Total 83

Pan American Games appearances (overview)
- 1951; 1955; 1959; 1963; 1967; 1971; 1975; 1979; 1983; 1987; 1991; 1995; 1999; 2003; 2007; 2011; 2015; 2019; 2023; 2027

Brazil competed at the 12th Pan American Games that were held in Mar del Plata, Argentina from March 11 to March 26, 1995.

== Medals ==
The following competitors from Brazil won medals at the games. In the by discipline sections below, medalists' names are bolded.

Medal	Name(s)	Sport	Event	Date	Ref
Bronze	André Domingos	Athletics	Men's 100m	18 March 1995	
Gold	Eronilde de Araújo	Athletics	Men's 400m hurdles	24 March 1995	
Silver	Éverson Teixeira	Athletics	Men's 400m hurdles	24 March 1995	
Gold	José Luíz Barbosa	Athletics	Men's 800m	23 March 1995	
Gold	Joaquim Cruz	Athletics	Men's 1500m	19 March 1995	
Gold	Wander Moura	Athletics	Men's 3000m steeplechase	22 March 1995	
Silver	Wander Moura	Athletics	Men's 5000m	25 March 1995	
Silver	Valdenor dos Santos	Athletics	Men's 10,000m	18 March 1995	
Bronze	Ronaldo da Costa	Athletics	Men's 10,000m	18 March 1995	
Bronze	Luiz Carlos da Silva	Athletics	Men's marathon	25 March 1995	
Silver	Luciana Mendes	Athletics	Women's 800m	23 March 1995	
Gold	Carmen Furtado	Athletics	Women's 10,000m	17 March 1995	
Bronze	Men's basketball team: Alberto Seabra André Matoso Aristides Josuel dos Santos Demétrius Conrado Ferraciú João Batista Guia Joelcio Joerke Luís Fernando da Silva Luiz de Azevedo Marco Aurélio Pegolo Rogério Klafke Rolando Ferreira Wilson Minuci	Basketball	Men's tournament	25 March 1995	
Silver	Acelino Freitas	Boxing	Men's lightweight (-60 kg)		
Bronze	Sebastián Cuattrin	Canoeing	Men's K-1 1000m		
Bronze	Álvaro Koslowski; Sebastián Cuattrin	Canoeing	Men's K-2 1000m		
Bronze	Jamil Suaiden; Hernandes Quadri; Márcio May; Mauro Ribeiro	Cycling	Men's 4000m pursuit team (track)		
Bronze	André Giovanini	Equestrian	Eventing		
Gold	André Johannpeter; Nelson Pessoa; Rodrigo Pessoa; Vitor Alves Teixeira	Equestrian	Jumping team		
Gold	André Giovanini; Luciano Drubi; Ruy Fonseca; Serguei Fofanoff	Equestrian	Eventing team		
Bronze	Camila Ferezin; Dayane Camilo; Fernanda Festa; Luciana Barrichello; Luciane de Oliveira	Gymnastics	Rhythmic gymnastics group all-around		
Silver	Men's handball team: Agberto Matos Cláudio Brito Daniel Pinheiro Andrade Eduardo Reis Fausto Steinwandter Gilberto Cardoso Ivan Maziero Ivan Raimundo Pinheiro José Ronaldo do Nascimento Marcos Antônio Cezar Marcelo Sampaio Milton Pelissari Osvaldo Inocente Filho Winglitton Rocha	Handball	Men's tournament		
Bronze	Women's handball team: Aliteia Puzi Andrea Sacramento Aurea Comparim Cristina Landgraf Ema Lorenzon Eva Paula Freire Margarida Conte Maria José Sales Nívia da Cruz Rosana de Aleluia Rosangela Silva Oliveira Rose Anne Gomes Verônica Gomes Soraya Novaes	Handball	Women's tournament		
Bronze	Rodolfo Yamayose	Judo	Men's flyweight (-56 kg)		
Bronze	Carlos Bortole	Judo	Men's extra lightweight (-60 kg)		
Bronze	Henrique Guimarães	Judo	Men's half lightweight (-65 kg)		
Bronze	Sérgio Ricardo Oliveira	Judo	Men's lightweight (-71 kg)		
Bronze	Flávio Canto	Judo	Men's half middleweight (-78 kg)		
Silver	Carlos Eduardo Matt	Judo	Men's middleweight (-86 kg)		
Silver	Daniel Dell'Aquila	Judo	Men's half heavyweight (-95 kg)		
Gold	José Mario Tranquillini	Judo	Men's heavyweight (+95 kg)		
Bronze	Andrea Rodrigues	Judo	Women's extra lightweight (-48 kg)		
Bronze	Danielle Zangrando	Judo	Women's lightweight (-56 kg)		
Bronze	Vânia Ishii	Judo	Women's middleweight (-66 kg)		
Bronze	Valéria Brandino	Judo	Women's half heavyweight (-72 kg)		
Silver	Edilene Andrade	Judo	Women's heavyweight (+72 kg)		
Bronze	Altamiro Oliveira	Karate	Men's kumite (+80 kg)		
Gold	José Gomes	Karate	Men's kumite open class		
Silver	Altamiro Oliveira; Antonio Carlos Pinto; Erivaldo Pinto; José Gomes	Karate	Men's kumite team		
Silver	Iara Oliveira	Karate	Women's kumite (-53 kg)		
Silver	Iara Oliveira; Rosemarie Perez; Scheila Bortagaray; Yuka Yonamine	Karate	Women's kumite team		
Silver	Men's roller hockey team: Fabio Bossi Flávio Pontes Guide Gustavo Marques Karan Feres Karan Jr. Leonardo Agra Leônidas Agra Luzardo Silveira Maurício Lazaro Rodrigo Pontes Braz Romeu Nogueira	Roller sports	Roller hockey		
Silver	Dirceu Marinho; Marcelus dos Santos	Rowing	Men's double sculls		
Bronze	Carlos de Almeida; Cláudio Tavares	Rowing	Men's coxless pair-oared shells		
Gold	Robert Scheidt	Sailing	Men's Laser class		
Silver	Cláudio Biekarck; Gunnar Ficker; Marcelo Batista da Silva	Sailing	Lightning class		
Bronze	Maria Krahe	Sailing	Women's Laser Radial class		
Gold	Márcia Pellicano	Sailing	Women's Europe class		
Silver	Júlio Almeida	Shooting	Men's 25m center fire pistol		
Silver	Fernando Cardoso Jr. Júlio Almeida; Mauriverth Spena	Shooting	Men's 25m center fire pistol team		
Bronze	Jodson Edington	Shooting	Men's 50m pistol		
Bronze	Luiz Felipe Borges; Luiz Eduardo Borges; Mario Silvio de Oliveira; Paul Conolly	Squash	Men's team		
Bronze	Flávia Roberts	Squash	Women's singles		
Bronze	Alessandra Bello; Aline da Silva; Flávia Roberts; Karina Kerr	Squash	Women's team		
Bronze	Alessandra Bello; Aline da Silva; Flávia Roberts; Karina Kerr; Luiz Felipe Borges; Luiz Eduardo Borges; Mario Silvio de Oliveira; Paul Conolly	Squash	Overall		
Gold	Fernando Scherer	Swimming	Men's 50m freestyle		
Silver	Eduardo Piccinini	Swimming	Men's 100m butterfly		
Gold	Gustavo Borges	Swimming	Men's 100m freestyle		
Bronze	Fernando Scherer	Swimming	Men's 100m freestyle		
Bronze	Rogério Romero	Swimming	Men's 200m backstroke		
Bronze	André Teixeira	Swimming	Men's 200m butterfly		
Gold	Gustavo Borges	Swimming	Men's 200m freestyle		
Silver	Luiz Lima	Swimming	Men's 400m freestyle		
Silver	Luiz Lima	Swimming	Men's 1500m freestyle		
Silver	Eduardo Piccinini; Fernando Scherer; Gustavo Borges; Roberto Piovesan	Swimming	Men's 4 × 100 m freestyle relay		
Silver	André Teixeira; Gustavo Borges; Oscar Godói; Rogério Romero	Swimming	Men's 4 × 100 m medley relay		
Silver	Cassiano Leal; Fernando Scherer; Gustavo Borges; Teófilo Ferreira	Swimming	Men's 4 × 200 m freestyle relay		
Bronze	Fabíola Molina	Swimming	Women's 100m backstroke		
Silver	Gabrielle Rose	Swimming	Women's 100m butterfly		
Bronze	Gabrielle Rose; Paula Marsiglia; Paula Renata Aguiar; Raquel Takaya	Swimming	Women's 4 × 100 m freestyle relay		
Bronze	Fabíola Molina; Gabrielle Rose; Patrícia Comini; Paula Renata Aguiar	Swimming	Women's 4 × 100 m medley relay		
Gold	Hugo Hoyama	Table tennis	Men's singles		
Silver	Cláudio Kano	Table tennis	Men's singles		
Gold	Cláudio Kano; Hugo Hoyama	Table tennis	Men's doubles		
Gold	Carlos Kawai; Cláudio Kano; Hugo Hoyama	Table tennis	Men's team		
Bronze	Hugo Hoyama; Livia Kosaka	Table tennis	Mixed doubles		
Silver	Lúcio Freitas	Taekwondo	Men's heavyweight (+83 kg)		
Bronze	Andrea Vieira; Luciana Tella	Tennis	Women's doubles		
Bronze	Andrea Vieira; Luciana Tella; Miriam D'Agostini; Vanessa Menga	Tennis	Women's team		
Gold	Leandro Macedo	Triathlon	Men's individual	26 March 1995	
Silver	Men's water polo team: Adriano Marsili Alexandre Miguel Lopes Armando Gutfreund Daniel Mameri Diogo Figueiredo Erik Seegerer Guilherme Pinciroli Michel Pontes Vieira Paulo César Fernandes Ricardo Perrone Roberto Chiappini Rodrigo Yacubian Yansel Gallindo	Water polo	Men's tournament		
Bronze	Emilson Dantas	Weightlifting	Men's first heavyweight (-99 kg) – snatch		
Bronze	Emilson Dantas	Weightlifting	Men's first heavyweight (-99 kg) – clean and jerk		

**Medals by sport**
**Sport**	1st place, gold medalist(s)	2nd place, silver medalist(s)	3rd place, bronze medalist(s)	Total
Athletics	5	4	3	12
Swimming	3	7	6	16
Table tennis	3	1	1	5
Sailing	2	1	1	4
Equestrian	2	0	1	3
Judo	1	3	9	13
Karate	1	3	1	5
Triathlon	1	0	0	1
Shooting	0	2	1	3
Handball	0	1	1	2
Rowing	0	1	1	2
Taekwondo	0	1	0	1
Roller sports	0	1	0	1
Boxing	0	1	0	1
Waterpolo	0	1	0	1
Squash	0	0	4	4
Weightlifting	0	0	2	2
Canoeing	0	0	2	2
Tennis	0	0	2	2
Gymnastics	0	0	1	1
Basketball	0	0	1	1
Cycling	0	0	1	1
**Total**	**18**	**27**	**38**	83

== See also ==
- Brazil at the 1996 Summer Olympics
- List of Pan American medalists for Brazil
