= Brazil at the FINA World Swimming Championships (25 m) =

- Flag of Brazil
- World Aquatics code: BRA
- National federation: Confederação Brasileira de Desportos Aquáticos
- Website: www.cbda.org.br
- Medals Ranked 7th: Gold 24 Silver 9 Bronze 23 Total 56

Brazil has participated in all the FINA World Swimming Championships (25 m) since the beginning in 1993. Brazil is 7th on the all time medal table. In the first time, Brazil win the overall medal table in 2014 World Swimming Championships (25 m) in Doha, Qatar.

== Medalists ==
Medal	Name	Year	Event
Gold	Fernando Scherer	1993 Palma de Mallorca	Men's 100 m freestyle
Gold	Fernando Scherer, Gustavo Borges, José Carlos Souza, Teófilo Ferreira	1993 Palma de Mallorca	Men's 4 × 100 m freestyle relay
Silver	Gustavo Borges	1993 Palma de Mallorca	Men's 100 m freestyle
Bronze	Cassiano Leal, Gustavo Borges, José Carlos Souza, Teófilo Ferreira	1993 Palma de Mallorca	Men's 4 × 200 m freestyle relay
Gold	Fernando Scherer	1995 Rio de Janeiro	Men's 100 m freestyle
Gold	Gustavo Borges	1995 Rio de Janeiro	Men's 200 m freestyle
Gold	Alexandre Massura, André Cordeiro, Fernando Scherer, Gustavo Borges	1995 Rio de Janeiro	Men's 4 × 100 m freestyle relay
Silver	Fernando Scherer	1995 Rio de Janeiro	Men's 50 m freestyle
Silver	Gustavo Borges	1995 Rio de Janeiro	Men's 100 m freestyle
Bronze	Cassiano Leal, Fernando Saez, Gustavo Borges, Teófilo Ferreira	1995 Rio de Janeiro	Men's 4 × 200 m freestyle relay
Gold	Gustavo Borges	1997 Gothenburg	Men's 200 m freestyle
Silver	Gustavo Borges	1997 Gothenburg	Men's 100 m freestyle
Silver	Gustavo Borges	2002 Moscow	Men's 200 m freestyle
Bronze	Eduardo Fischer	2002 Moscow	Men's 50 m breaststroke
Gold	Thiago Pereira	2004 Indianapolis	Men's 200 m individual medley
Silver	César Cielo, Christiano Santos, Nicholas Santos, Thiago Pereira	2004 Indianapolis	Men's 4 × 100 m freestyle relay
Bronze	Nicholas Santos	2004 Indianapolis	Men's 50 m individual medley
Bronze	Thiago Pereira	2004 Indianapolis	Men's 100 m individual medley
Bronze	Lucas Salatta, Rafael Mosca, Rodrigo Castro, Thiago Pereira	2004 Indianapolis	Men's 4 × 200 m freestyle relay
Gold	Kaio Almeida	2006 Shanghai	Men's 100 m butterfly
Bronze	Kaio Almeida	2006 Shanghai	Men's 50 m butterfly
Gold	César Cielo	2010 Dubai	Men's 50 m freestyle
Gold	César Cielo	2010 Dubai	Men's 100 m freestyle
Gold	Felipe França Silva	2010 Dubai	Men's 50 m breaststroke
Silver	Kaio Almeida	2010 Dubai	Men's 200 m butterfly
Bronze	Felipe França Silva	2010 Dubai	Men's 100 m breaststroke
Bronze	Kaio Almeida	2010 Dubai	Men's 100 m butterfly
Bronze	César Cielo, Marcelo Chierighini, Nicholas Santos, Nicolas Oliveira	2010 Dubai	Men's 4 × 100 m freestyle relay
Bronze	César Cielo, Felipe França Silva, Guilherme Guido, Kaio Almeida, Glauber Silva^{[a]}, Henrique Barbosa^{[a]}, Nicolas Oliveira^{[a]}	2010 Dubai	Men's 4 × 100 m medley relay
Gold	Nicholas Santos	2012 Istanbul	Men's 50 m butterfly
Bronze	Guilherme Guido	2012 Istanbul	Men's 100 m backstroke
Gold	César Cielo	2014 Doha	Men's 100 m freestyle
Gold	Felipe França Silva	2014 Doha	Men's 50 m breaststroke
Gold	Felipe França Silva	2014 Doha	Men's 100 m breaststroke
Gold	Etiene Medeiros	2014 Doha	Women's 50 m backstroke
Gold	César Cielo, Felipe França Silva, Guilherme Guido, Nicholas Santos, Henrique Martins^{[a]}, João de Lucca^{[a]}	2014 Doha	Men's 4 × 50 m medley relay
Gold	César Cielo, Felipe França Silva, Guilherme Guido, Marcos Macedo, Henrique Martins^{[a]}	2014 Doha	Men's 4 × 100 m medley relay
Gold	Felipe França Silva, Nicholas Santos, Etiene Medeiros, Larissa Oliveira, Henrique Martins^{[a]}, Daiane Oliveira^{[a]}	2014 Doha	4 × 50 m mixed medley relay
Silver	Nicholas Santos	2014 Doha	Men's 50 m butterfly
Bronze	César Cielo	2014 Doha	Men's 50 m freestyle
Bronze	César Cielo, João de Lucca, Etiene Medeiros, Larissa Oliveira, Alan Vitória^{[a]}, Henrique Martins^{[a]}, Alessandra Marchioro^{[a]}, Daiane Oliveira^{[a]}	2014 Doha	4 × 50 m mixed freestyle relay
Gold	Etiene Medeiros	2016 Windsor	Women's 50 m backstroke
Silver	Felipe Lima, Nicholas Santos, Etiene Medeiros, Larissa Oliveira	2016 Windsor	4 × 50 m mixed medley relay
Bronze	Felipe Lima	2016 Windsor	Men's 50 m breaststroke
Gold	Luiz Altamir Melo, Fernando Scheffer, Leonardo Coelho Santos, Breno Correia, Leonardo de Deus^{[a]}	2018 Hangzhou	Men's 4 × 200 m freestyle relay
Gold	Nicholas Santos	2018 Hangzhou	Men's 50 m butterfly
Bronze	Matheus Santana, Marcelo Chierighini, César Cielo, Breno Correia	2018 Hangzhou	Men's 4 × 100 m freestyle relay
Bronze	Guilherme Guido, Felipe Lima, Nicholas Santos, César Cielo, Matheus Santana^{[a]}	2018 Hangzhou	Men's 4 × 50 m medley relay
Bronze	Brandonn Almeida	2018 Hangzhou	Men's 400 m medley
Bronze	Felipe Lima	2018 Hangzhou	Men's 50 m breaststroke
Bronze	Etiene Medeiros	2018 Hangzhou	Women's 50 m freestyle
Bronze	Daiene Dias	2018 Hangzhou	Women's 100 m butterfly
Gold	Nicholas Santos	2021 Abu Dhabi	Men's 50 m butterfly
Bronze	Fernando Scheffer, Murilo Sartori, Kaique Alves, Breno Correia, Leonardo Coelho Santos^{[a]}	2021 Abu Dhabi	Men's 4 × 200 m freestyle relay
Bronze	João Gomes Júnior	2021 Abu Dhabi	Men's 50 m breaststroke
Gold	Nicholas Santos	2022 Melbourne	Men's 50 m butterfly

^{a} Swimmers who participated in the heats only and received medals.

== Medal tables ==
=== By championships ===
Year	Gold	Silver	Bronze	Total
(Qatar) 2014 Doha	7	1	2	10
(Brazil) 1995 Rio de Janeiro	3	2	1	6
(United Arab Emirates) 2010 Dubai	3	1	4	8
(Spain) 1993 Palma de Mallorca	2	1	1	4
(China) 2018 Hangzhou	2	0	6	8
(United States) 2004 Indianapolis	1	1	3	5
(Canada) 2016 Windsor	1	1	1	3
(Sweden) 1997 Gothenburg	1	1	0	2
(China) 2006 Shanghai	1	0	1	2
(Turkey) 2012 Istanbul	1	0	1	2
(Russia) 2002 Moscow	0	1	1	2
1999 Hong Kong	0	0	0	0
(Greece) 2000 Athens	0	0	0	0
(United Kingdom) 2008 Manchester	0	0	0	0
Totals (14 entries)	22	9	21	52

=== By gender ===
Gender	Gold	Silver	Bronze	Total
Men	19	8	18	45
Women	2	0	2	4
Mixed	1	1	1	3

=== By athlete ===
Athlete	Gold	Silver	Bronze	Total
Felipe França Silva	6	0	2	8
César Cielo	5	1	6	12
Gustavo Borges	4	4	2	10
Nicholas Santos	4	3	3	10
Fernando Scherer	4	1	0	5
Etiene Medeiros	3	1	2	6
Henrique Martins	3	0	1	4
Guilherme Guido	2	0	3	5
Kaio Almeida	1	1	3	5
Thiago Pereira	1	1	2	4
Larissa Oliveira	1	1	1	3
Teófilo Ferreira	1	0	2	3
Felipe Lima	0	1	3	4

Only athletes with at least three medals

== Best Finishes ==
=== Men ===
Event	Gold	Silver	Bronze	Total	Best finish
Men's 50 metre freestyle	1	1	1	3	(gold) (2010)
Men's 100 metre freestyle	4	3	0	7	(gold) (1993, 1995, 2010, 2014)
Men's 200 metre freestyle	2	1	0	3	(gold) (1995, 1997)
Men's 400 metre freestyle	0	0	0	0	8th (1997, 1999, 2018)
Men's 1500 metre freestyle	0	0	0	0	4th (1995)
Men's 50 metre backstroke	0	0	0	0	4th (2012)
Men's 100 metre backstroke	0	0	1	1	(bronze) (2012)
Men's 200 metre backstroke	0	0	0	0	4th (1993)
Men's 50 metre breaststroke	2	0	4	6	(gold) (2010, 2014)
Men's 100 metre breaststroke	1	0	1	2	(gold) (2014)
Men's 200 metre breaststroke	0	0	0	0	7th (2014)
Men's 50 metre butterfly	4	1	1	6	(gold) (2012, 2018, 2021, 2022)
Men's 100 metre butterfly	1	0	1	2	(gold) (2006)
Men's 200 metre butterfly	0	1	0	1	(silver) (2010)
Men's 100 metre individual medley	0	0	1	1	(bronze) (2004)
Men's 200 metre individual medley	1	0	0	1	(gold) (2004)
Men's 400 metre individual medley	0	0	1	1	(bronze) (2018)
Men's 4 × 50 metre freestyle relay	0	0	0	0	8th (2022)
Men's 4 × 100 metre freestyle relay	2	1	2	5	(gold) (1993, 1995)
Men's 4 × 200 metre freestyle relay	1	0	4	5	(gold) (2018)
Men's 4 × 50 metre medley relay	1	0	1	2	(gold) (2014)
Men's 4 × 100 metre medley relay	1	0	1	2	(gold) (2014)

=== Women ===
Event	Gold	Silver	Bronze	Total	Best finish
Women's 50 metre freestyle	0	0	1	1	(bronze) (2018)
Women's 100 metre freestyle	0	0	0	0	8th (2006)
Women's 200 metre freestyle	0	0	0	0	8th (2016)
Women's 400 metre freestyle	0	0	0	0	8th (2006)
Women's 800 metre freestyle	0	0	0	0	8th (2022)
Women's 50 metre backstroke	2	0	0	2	(gold) (2014, 2016)
Women's 100 metre backstroke	0	0	0	0	7th (2014)
Women's 200 metre backstroke	0	0	0	0	12th (1999)
Women's 50 metre breaststroke	0	0	0	0	9th (2021)
Women's 100 metre breaststroke	0	0	0	0	22nd (2021)
Women's 200 metre breaststroke	0	0	0	0	23rd (2021)
Women's 50 metre butterfly	0	0	0	0	8th (2014)
Women's 100 metre butterfly	0	0	1	1	(bronze) (2018)
Women's 200 metre butterfly	0	0	0	0	11th (2021)
Women's 100 metre individual medley	0	0	0	0	9th (1999)
Women's 200 metre individual medley	0	0	0	0	4th (1995)
Women's 400 metre individual medley	0	0	0	0	10th (1999)
Women's 4 × 50 metre freestyle relay	0	0	0	0	8th (2014)
Women's 4 × 100 metre freestyle relay	0	0	0	0	4th (2004)
Women's 4 × 200 metre freestyle relay	0	0	0	0	6th (2004)
Women's 4 × 50 metre medley relay	0	0	0	0	5th (2014)
Women's 4 × 100 metre medley relay	0	0	0	0	6th (1995)

=== Mixed ===
Event	Gold	Silver	Bronze	Total	Best finish
4 × 50 metre mixed freestyle relay	0	0	1	1	(bronze) (2014)
4 × 50 metre mixed medley relay	1	1	0	2	(gold) (2014)

== See also ==
- Brazil at the World Aquatics Championships
