= Swimming at the 1995 Pan American Games – Men's 4 × 200 metre freestyle relay =

Men's 4 × 200 metre freestyle relay at the 1995 Pan American Games
- Venue: Complejo Natatorio
- Dates: March 12–17 (preliminaries and finals)
- Competitors: from - nations
- Winning time: 7:21.61

Medalists
Gold medal	Jon Olsen; Josh Davis; Ryan Berube; Greg Burgess	United States
Silver medal	Fernando Scherer; Gustavo Borges; Cassiano Leal; Teófilo Ferreira	Brazil
Bronze medal	Oscar Sotelo; Nelson Vargas; José Castellanos; Jose Anaya	Mexico

The men's 4 × 200 metre freestyle relay competition of the swimming events at the 1991 Pan American Games took place between March 12–17 at the Complejo Natatorio in Havana, Cuba. The last Pan American Games champion was the United States.

This race consisted of sixteen lengths of the pool. Each of the four swimmers completed four lengths of the pool. The first swimmer had to touch the wall before the second could leave the starting block.

== Results ==
All times are in minutes and seconds.

KEY:	q	Fastest non-qualifiers	Q	Qualified	GR	Games record	NR	National record	PB	Personal best	SB	Seasonal best

=== Final ===
The final was held between March 12–17.

Rank	Nation	Swimmers	Time	Notes
1st place, gold medalist(s)	United States	Jon Olsen; Josh Davis; Ryan Berube; Greg Burgess	7:21.61	GR
2nd place, silver medalist(s)	Brazil	Fernando Saez; Gustavo Borges; Cassiano Leal; Teófilo Ferreira	7:28.70	
3rd place, bronze medalist(s)	Mexico	Oscar Sotelo; Nelson Vargas; José Castellanos; Jose Anaya	7:39.56	
4	Argentina	- - - -	7:45.31	
5	Ecuador	- - - -	7:54.53	
6	-	- - - -	-	
7	-	- - - -	-	
8	-	- - - -	-	
