= Swimming at the 1995 Pan American Games – Men's 200 metre freestyle =

Men's 200 metre freestyle at the 1995 Pan American Games
- Venue: Complejo Natatorio
- Dates: between March 12–17 (preliminaries and finals)
- Competitors: from - nations

Medalists
Gold medal	Gustavo Borges	Brazil
Silver medal	Greg Burgess	United States
Bronze medal	Josh Davis	United States

The men's 200 metre freestyle competition of the swimming events at the 1995 Pan American Games took place between March 12–17 at the Complejo Natatorio. The last Pan American Games champion was Eric Diehl of US.

This race consisted of four lengths of the pool, all in freestyle.

== Results ==
All times are in minutes and seconds.

KEY:	q	Fastest non-qualifiers	Q	Qualified	GR	Games record	NR	National record	PB	Personal best	SB	Seasonal best

=== Final ===
The final was held between March 12–17.

Rank	Name	Nationality	Time	Notes
1st place, gold medalist(s)	Gustavo Borges	Brazil	1:48.49	
2nd place, silver medalist(s)	Greg Burgess	United States	1:51.69	
3rd place, bronze medalist(s)	Josh Davis	United States	1:51.92	
4	Cassiano Leal	Brazil	1:52.87	
5	Oscar Sotelo	Mexico	1:53.91	
6	Jorge Anaya	Mexico	1:55.25	
7	Felipe Delgado	Ecuador	1:56.33	
8	Alejandro Bermúdez	Colombia	1:57.01	
