= Swimming at the 1995 Pan American Games – Men's 400 metre freestyle =

Men's 400 metre freestyle at the 1995 Pan American Games
- Venue: Complejo Natatorio
- Dates: between March 12–17 (preliminaries and finals)
- Competitors: from - nations

Medalists
Gold medal	Josh Davis	United States
Silver medal	Luiz Lima	Brazil
Bronze medal	Jon Sakovich	United States

The men's 400 metre freestyle competition of the swimming events at the 1995 Pan American Games took place between March 12–17 at the Complejo Natatorio. The last Pan American Games champion was Sean Killion of US.

This race consisted of eight lengths of the pool, with all eight being in the freestyle stroke.

== Results ==
All times are in minutes and seconds.

KEY:	q	Fastest non-qualifiers	Q	Qualified	GR	Games record	NR	National record	PB	Personal best	SB	Seasonal best

=== Final ===
The final was held between March 12–17.

Rank	Name	Nationality	Time	Notes
1st place, gold medalist(s)	Josh Davis	United States	3:55.59	
2nd place, silver medalist(s)	Luiz Lima	Brazil	3:56.33	
3rd place, bronze medalist(s)	Jon Sakovich	United States	3:57.37	
4	Alejandro Bermúdez	Colombia	3:57.76	
5	Gabriel Chaillou	Argentina	-	
6	Cassiano Leal	Brazil	4:03.15	
7	Gaston Cesar	Argentina	4:08.26	
8	Reynaldo Campos	Peru	4:15.35	
