= Swimming at the 1995 Pan American Games – Men's 50 metre freestyle =

Men's 50 metre freestyle at the 1995 Pan American Games
- Venue: Complejo Natatorio
- Dates: between March 12–17 (preliminaries and finals)
- Competitors: from - nations

Medalists
Gold medal	Fernando Scherer	Brazil
Silver medal	Bill Pilczuk	United States
Bronze medal	Tom Jager	United States

The men's 50 metre freestyle competition of the swimming events at the 1995 Pan American Games took place between March 12–17 at the Complejo Natatorio. The last Pan American Games champion was Todd Pace of US.

This race consisted of one length of the pool in freestyle.

== Results ==
All times are in minutes and seconds.

KEY:	q	Fastest non-qualifiers	Q	Qualified	GR	Games record	NR	National record	PB	Personal best	SB	Seasonal best

=== Final ===
The final was held between March 12–17.

Rank	Name	Nationality	Time	Notes
1st place, gold medalist(s)	Fernando Scherer	Brazil	22.65	
2nd place, silver medalist(s)	Bill Pilczuk	United States	22.71	
3rd place, bronze medalist(s)	Tom Jager	United States	22.75	
4	Gustavo Borges	Brazil	22.82	
5	Francisco Sánchez	Venezuela	23.09	
6	Felipe Delgado	Ecuador	23.21	
7	Ricardo Busquets	Puerto Rico	23.54	
8	Enrico Linscheer	Suriname	23.57	
