= Swimming at the 1995 Pan American Games – Men's 4 × 100 metre freestyle relay =

Men's 4 × 100 metre freestyle relay at the 1995 Pan American Games
- Venue: Complejo Natatorio
- Dates: between March 12–17 (preliminaries and finals)
- Competitors: from - nations

Medalists
Gold medal	Gary Hall, Jr., Tom Jager, Josh Davis and Jon Olsen	United States
Silver medal	Fernando Scherer, Gustavo Borges, Eduardo Piccinini and Roberto Piovesan	Brazil
Bronze medal	-, -, - and -	Venezuela

The men's 4 × 100 metre freestyle relay competition of the swimming events at the 1995 Pan American Games took place between March 12–17 at the Complejo Natatorio. The last Pan American Games champion was Brazil.

This race consisted of eight lengths of the pool. Each of the four swimmers completed two lengths of the pool. The first swimmer had to touch the wall before the second could leave the starting block.

== Results ==
All times are in minutes and seconds.

KEY:	q	Fastest non-qualifiers	Q	Qualified	GR	Games record	NR	National record	PB	Personal best	SB	Seasonal best

=== Final ===
The final was held between March 12–17.

Rank	Name	Nationality	Time	Notes
1st place, gold medalist(s)	Gary Hall, Jr. Tom Jager; Josh Davis; Jon Olsen	United States	3:18.60	GR
2nd place, silver medalist(s)	Fernando Scherer; Gustavo Borges; Eduardo Piccinini; Roberto Piovesan	Brazil	3:20.33	
3rd place, bronze medalist(s)	- - - -	Venezuela	3:25.43	
4	- - - -	Puerto Rico	3:25.47	
5	- - - -	Mexico	3:28.30	
6	- - - -	Ecuador	3:32.04	
7	- - - -	Panama	3:43.93	
8	- - - -	Argentina	DQ	
