= Swimming at the 1991 Pan American Games – Men's 4 × 200 metre freestyle relay =

Men's 4 × 200 metre freestyle relay at the 1991 Pan American Games
- Venue: -
- Dates: August 13 (preliminaries and finals)
- Competitors: from - nations

Medalists
Gold medal	John Keppeler, Jim Wells, Clay Tippins and Eric Diehl	United States
Silver medal	Teófilo Ferreira, Emmanuel Nascimento, Cassiano Leal and Gustavo Borges	Brazil
Bronze medal	-, -, - and -	Puerto Rico

The men's 4 × 200 metre freestyle relay competition of the swimming events at the 1991 Pan American Games took place on 13 August. The last Pan American Games champion was the United States.

This race consisted of sixteen lengths of the pool. Each of the four swimmers completed four lengths of the pool. The first swimmer had to touch the wall before the second could leave the starting block.

== Results ==
All times are in minutes and seconds.

KEY:	q	Fastest non-qualifiers	Q	Qualified	GR	Games record	NR	National record	PB	Personal best	SB	Seasonal best

=== Final ===
The final was held on August 13.

Rank	Name	Nationality	Time	Notes
1st place, gold medalist(s)	John Keppeler; Jim Wells; Clay Tippins; Eric Diehl	United States	7:23.39	
2nd place, silver medalist(s)	Teófilo Ferreira; Emmanuel Nascimento; Cassiano Leal; Gustavo Borges	Brazil	7:28.83	
3rd place, bronze medalist(s)	- - - -	Puerto Rico	7:29.96	
4	- - - -	Canada	7:30.77	
5	- - - -	Cuba	7:31.56	NR
6	- - - -	Mexico	7:36.58	
7	- - - -	Uruguay	8:07.90	
8	- - - -	Bahamas	8:25.04	
