= Swimming at the 1995 Pan American Games – Men's 100 metre butterfly =

Men's 100 metre butterfly at the 1995 Pan American Games
- Venue: Complejo Natatorio
- Dates: between March 12–17 (preliminaries and finals)
- Competitors: from - nations

Medalists
Gold medal	Mark Henderson	United States
Silver medal	Eduardo Piccinini	Brazil
Bronze medal	Brian Alderman	United States

The men's 100 metre butterfly competition of the swimming events at the 1995 Pan American Games took place between March 12–17 at the Complejo Natatorio. The last Pan American Games champion was Anthony Nesty of Suriname.

This race consisted of two lengths of the pool, all in butterfly.

== Results ==
All times are in minutes and seconds.

KEY:	q	Fastest non-qualifiers	Q	Qualified	GR	Games record	NR	National record	PB	Personal best	SB	Seasonal best

=== Final ===
The final was held between March 12–17.

Rank	Name	Nationality	Time	Notes
1st place, gold medalist(s)	Mark Henderson	United States	54.11	
2nd place, silver medalist(s)	Eduardo Piccinini	Brazil	54.63	
3rd place, bronze medalist(s)	Brian Alderman	United States	54.75	
4	Francisco Sánchez	Venezuela	54.99	
5	Edward Parenti	Canada	55.23	
6	Diego Cuenca	Colombia	55.67	
7	José Meolans	Argentina	55.91	
8	Ruben Calderon	El Salvador	56.04	
