= Swimming at the 1995 Pan American Games – Men's 1500 metre freestyle =

Men's 1500 metre freestyle at the 1995 Pan American Games
- Venue: Complejo Natatorio
- Dates: between March 12–17 (preliminaries and finals)
- Competitors: from - nations

Medalists
Gold medal	Carlton Bruner	United States
Silver medal	Luiz Lima	Brazil
Bronze medal	Ryan Cox	United States

The men's 1500 metre freestyle competition of the swimming events at the 1995 Pan American Games took place between March 12–17 at the Complejo Natatorio. The last Pan American Games champion was Alex Kostich of US.

This race consisted of thirty lengths of the pool, all lengths being in freestyle.

== Results ==
All times are in minutes and seconds.

KEY:	q	Fastest non-qualifiers	Q	Qualified	GR	Games record	NR	National record	PB	Personal best	SB	Seasonal best

=== Final ===
The final was held between March 12–17.

Rank	Name	Nationality	Time	Notes
1st place, gold medalist(s)	Carlton Bruner	United States	15:13.90	
2nd place, silver medalist(s)	Luiz Lima	Brazil	15:19.53	
3rd place, bronze medalist(s)	Ryan Cox	United States	15:37.28	
4	Alexandre Angelot	Brazil	15:38.10	
5	Simon Azarrat	Venezuela	15:50.94	
6	Gaston Cesar	Argentina	16:16.54	
7	-	-	-	
8	-	-	-	
