= Swimming at the 1995 Pan American Games – Men's 100 metre freestyle =

Men's 100 metre freestyle at the 1995 Pan American Games
- Venue: Complejo Natatorio
- Dates: between March 12–17 (preliminaries and finals)
- Competitors: from - nations

Medalists
Gold medal	Gustavo Borges	Brazil
Silver medal	Jon Olsen	United States
Bronze medal	Fernando Scherer	Brazil

The men's 100 metre freestyle competition of the swimming events at the 1995 Pan American Games took place between March 12–17 at the Complejo Natatorio. The last Pan American Games champion was Gustavo Borges of Brazil.

This race consisted of two lengths of the pool, both lengths being in freestyle.

== Results ==
All times are in minutes and seconds.

KEY:	q	Fastest non-qualifiers	Q	Qualified	GR	Games record	NR	National record	PB	Personal best	SB	Seasonal best

=== Final ===
The final was held between March 12–17.

Rank	Name	Nationality	Time	Notes
1st place, gold medalist(s)	Gustavo Borges	Brazil	49.31	GR
2nd place, silver medalist(s)	Jon Olsen	United States	49.39	
3rd place, bronze medalist(s)	Fernando Scherer	Brazil	49.79	
4	Gary Hall, Jr.	United States	50.08	
5	Francisco Sánchez	Venezuela	50.12	
6	Ricardo Busquets	Puerto Rico	50.49	
7	Diego Henao	Venezuela	51.57	
8	Felipe Delgado	Ecuador	51.94	
