= Swimming at the 2003 Pan American Games – Men's 4 × 100 metre freestyle relay =

The Men's 4 × 100 m Freestyle Relay event at the 2003 Pan American Games took place on August 15, 2003 (Day 15 of the Games). Brazil won the men's 4 × 100 free relay in 3:18.66, just short of their Games record from four years ago. Venezuela was second and Canada was third. The USA was disqualified when the second swimmer Jayme Cramer left early.

== Medalists ==
Gold	Carlos Jayme; Gustavo Borges; Fernando Scherer; Jader Souza; Brazil
Silver	Osvaldo Quevedo; Raymond Rosal; Luis Rojas; Octavio Alesi; Venezuela
Bronze	Colin Russell; Matt Rose; Brian Edey; Chad Murray; Canada

== Records ==
Record	Nation	Time	Date	Venue
World Record	Australia	3:13.67	2000-09-16	Sydney, Australia
Pan Am Record	Brazil	3:17.18	1999-08-05	Winnipeg, Canada

== Results ==
Place	Nation	Swimmers	Heats		Final
Place	Nation	Swimmers	Time	Rank	Time
1	Brazil	♦ Carlos Jayme ♦ Gustavo Borges ♦ Fernando Scherer ♦ Jader Souza	3:27.07	2	3:18.66
2	Venezuela	♦ Osvaldo Quevedo ♦ Raymond Rosal ♦ Luis Rojas ♦ Octavio Alesi	3:28.12	3	3:23.14
3	Canada	♦ Colin Russell ♦ Matt Rose ♦ Brian Edey ♦ Chad Murray	3:29.72	4	3:23.83
4	Mexico	♦ ♦ ♦ ♦	3:31.26	6	3:26.68
5	Barbados	♦ ♦ ♦ ♦	3:32.30	7	3:30.16
6	Virgin Islands	♦ Josh Laban ♦ George Gleason ♦ Morgan Locke ♦ Kieran Locke	3:30.73	5	3:30.70 NR
7	Bahamas	♦ ♦ ♦ ♦	3:33.58	8	3:33.69
—	United States	♦ ♦ ♦ ♦	3:22.36	1	DQ
9	Dominican Republic	♦ Christopher Backhaus ♦ Santos ♦ Rodríguez ♦ Rodríguez	3:36.97 NR	9	
