= Swimming at the 1991 Pan American Games – Men's 4 × 100 metre freestyle relay =

Men's 4 × 100 metre freestyle relay at the 1991 Pan American Games
- Venue: -
- Dates: August 16 (preliminaries and finals)
- Competitors: from - nations

Medalists
Gold medal	Teófilo Ferreira, Emmanuel Nascimento, Júlio César Rebolal and Gustavo Borges	Brazil
Silver medal	-, -, - and -	Canada
Bronze medal	-, -, - and -	Puerto Rico

The men's 4 × 100 metre freestyle relay competition of the swimming events at the 1991 Pan American Games took place on 16 August. The last Pan American Games champion was the United States.

This race consisted of eight lengths of the pool. Each of the four swimmers completed two lengths of the pool. The first swimmer had to touch the wall before the second could leave the starting block.

Brazil's victory in the men's 4x100m freestyle relay was only the second time that the U.S. lost the gold in a relay event, at the Pan American Games. The first had been to Canada in women's 4x100m medley at the 1971 Pan American Games.

== Results ==
All times are in minutes and seconds.

KEY:	q	Fastest non-qualifiers	Q	Qualified	GR	Games record	NR	National record	PB	Personal best	SB	Seasonal best

=== Final ===
The final was held on August 16.

Rank	Name	Nationality	Time	Notes
1st place, gold medalist(s)	Teófilo Ferreira; Emmanuel Nascimento; Júlio César Rebolal; Gustavo Borges	Brazil	3:23.28	
2nd place, silver medalist(s)	- - - -	Canada	3:25.39	
3rd place, bronze medalist(s)	- - - -	Puerto Rico	3:27.17	
4	- - - -	Mexico	3:27.80	
5	- - - -	Cuba	3:31.48	
6	- - - -	Argentina	3:35.32	
7	- - - -	Trinidad and Tobago	3:37.11	
8	- - - -	Bahamas	3:37.62	
