= 1993 FINA World Swimming Championships (25 m) – Men's 4 × 100 metre freestyle relay =

The finals and the qualifying heats of the Men's 4 × 100 metres Freestyle Relay event at the 1993 FINA Short Course World Championships were held in Palma de Mallorca, Spain.

== Final ==
| Rank | Final | Time |
|---|---|---|
| | Brazil; Fernando Scherer; Teófilo Ferreira; José Carlos Souza; Gustavo Borges | 3:12.11 WR |
| | United States; David Fox; Seth Pepper; Jon Olsen; Mark Henderson | 3:12.68 |
| | Russia; Roman Shegolev; Vladislav Kulikov; Vladimir Predkin; Yury Mukhin | 3:15.56 |
| 4. | France; Bruno Gutzeit; Ludovic Depickère; Lionel Poirot; Frédéric Lefevre | 3:18.78 |
| 5. | Italy; Emanuele Idini; Emanuele Merisi; Bruno Zorzan; Luca Bianchin | 3:22.46 |
| 6. | Croatia; Marijan Kanjer; Miroslav Vučetić; Marko Strahija; Miloš Milošević | 3:22.68 |
| 7. | Ireland; Nicholas O'Hare; Adrian O'Connor; Justin Mitchell; Gary O'Toole | 3:30.18 |
| — | Sweden; Christer Wallin; Joakim Holmqvist; Tommy Werner; Anders Holmertz | DSQ |

== See also ==
- 1992 Men's Olympic Games 4 × 100 m Freestyle Relay
- 1993 Men's European LC Championships 4 × 100 m Freestyle Relay
