= Swimming at the 1991 Pan American Games – Men's 50 metre freestyle =

Men's 50 metre freestyle at the 1991 Pan American Games
- Venue: -
- Dates: August 17 (preliminaries and finals)
- Competitors: from - nations

Medalists
Gold medal	Todd Pace	United States
Silver medal	Adam Schmitt	United States
Bronze medal	Gustavo Borges	Brazil

The men's 50 metre freestyle competition of the swimming events at the 1991 Pan American Games took place on 17 August. The last Pan American Games champion was Tom Williams of US.

This race consisted of one length of the pool in freestyle.

== Results ==
All times are in minutes and seconds.

KEY:	q	Fastest non-qualifiers	Q	Qualified	GR	Games record	NR	National record	PB	Personal best	SB	Seasonal best

=== Final ===
The final was held on August 17.

Rank	Name	Nationality	Time	Notes
1st place, gold medalist(s)	Todd Pace	United States	22.60	
2nd place, silver medalist(s)	Adam Schmitt	United States	22.61	
3rd place, bronze medalist(s)	Gustavo Borges	Brazil	22.82	
4	Ricardo Busquets	Puerto Rico	23.42	
5	Rodrigo González	Mexico	23.53	
6	Regent Lacoursiere	Canada	23.77	
7	Enrico Linscheer	Suriname	23.79	
8	José Carlos Souza	Brazil	23.80	
