= María del Pilar Pereyra =

Argentine swimmer (born 1978)

Personal information
- Born: January 24, 1978 (age 48)
Medal record
Women's Swimming
Representing Argentina
Pan American Games
| Bronze medal – third place | 1995 Mar del Plata | 200m Butterfly |
| Bronze medal – third place | 1995 Mar del Plata | 4x200m Freestyle |

María del Pilar Pereyra (born January 24, 1978) is a retired female butterfly and freestyle swimmer from Argentina who represented her native country twice at the Summer Olympics, in 1996 and 2000. She claimed the bronze medal in the Women's 200m Butterfly event at the 1995 Pan American Games.
