= Karate at the 1995 Pan American Games =

This page shows the results of the Karate Competition for men and women at the 1995 Pan American Games, held from March 11 to March 26, 1995 in Mar del Plata, Argentina. There were eleven events, for both men (seven) and women (four), in this inaugural Pan Am event.

== Men's competition ==
=== Men's Kata ===
RANK	NAME ATHLETE
	Christi Chutchurru (ARG)
	Fredy Arevalo (PER)
	Tredie Allas (USA)

=== Men's Kumite (– 66 kg) ===
RANK	NAME ATHLETE
	Pablo Torres del Toro (CUB)
	Sergio Gavrelof (ARG)
	Carlos Espajo (COL)
	Puerto Rico (PUR)

=== Men's Kumite (– 72 kg) ===
RANK	NAME ATHLETE
	José Vilela (CUB)
	Javier Strohmeier (PER)
	Dustin Baldis (USA)
	Colombia (COL)

=== Men's Kumite (– 80 kg) ===
RANK	NAME ATHLETE
	Noel Hernández (CUB)
	Daniel Tesoro (ARG)
	Thomas Hodd (USA)
	Netherlands Antilles (AHO)

=== Men's Kumite (+ 80 kg) ===
RANK	NAME ATHLETE
	Eddy Obispo (AHO)
	Anibal Rossi (ARG)
	Otilio Cartagena (PUR)
	Altamiro Oliveira (BRA)

=== Men's Kumite (Open Class) ===
RANK	NAME ATHLETE
	José Gómez (BRA)
	Lazaro Montano (CUB)
	Eric Albino (PUR)
	Netherlands Antilles (AHO)

=== Men's Kumite (Team) ===
RANK	TEAM
	Argentina (ARG)
	Brazil (BRA)
	Paraguay (PAR)
	United States (USA)

== Women's competition ==
=== Women's Kata ===
RANK	NAME ATHLETE
	Melanie Genum (USA)
	Sandy Kim (PER)
	Paola Chaves (ARG)

=== Women's Kumite (– 53 kg) ===
RANK	NAME ATHLETE
	Vivian Sosa (CUB)
	Lara Oliveira (BRA)
	Julia Seclen (PER)
	Verónica Torres (ARG)

=== Women's Kumite (+ 53 kg) ===
RANK	NAME ATHLETE
	Nicole Poirier (CAN)
	Tracey Day (USA)
	Maria Silvera (URU)

=== Women's Kumite (Team) ===
RANK	TEAM
	Cuba (CUB)
	Brazil (BRA)
	Argentina (ARG)
	United States (USA)

== Medal table ==
Place	Nation	Gold medal	Silver medal	Bronze medal	Total
1	Cuba	5	1	0	6
2	Argentina	2	3	3	8
3	Brazil	1	3	1	6
4	United States	1	1	5	7
5	Netherlands Antilles	1	0	4	5
6	Canada	1	0	0	1
7	Peru	0	3	1	4
8	Colombia	0	0	2	1
8	Puerto Rico	0	0	2	2
8	Paraguay	0	0	1	1
8	Uruguay	0	0	1	1
Total		11	11	20	41
