= Belayneh Dinsamo =

Ethiopian long-distance runner

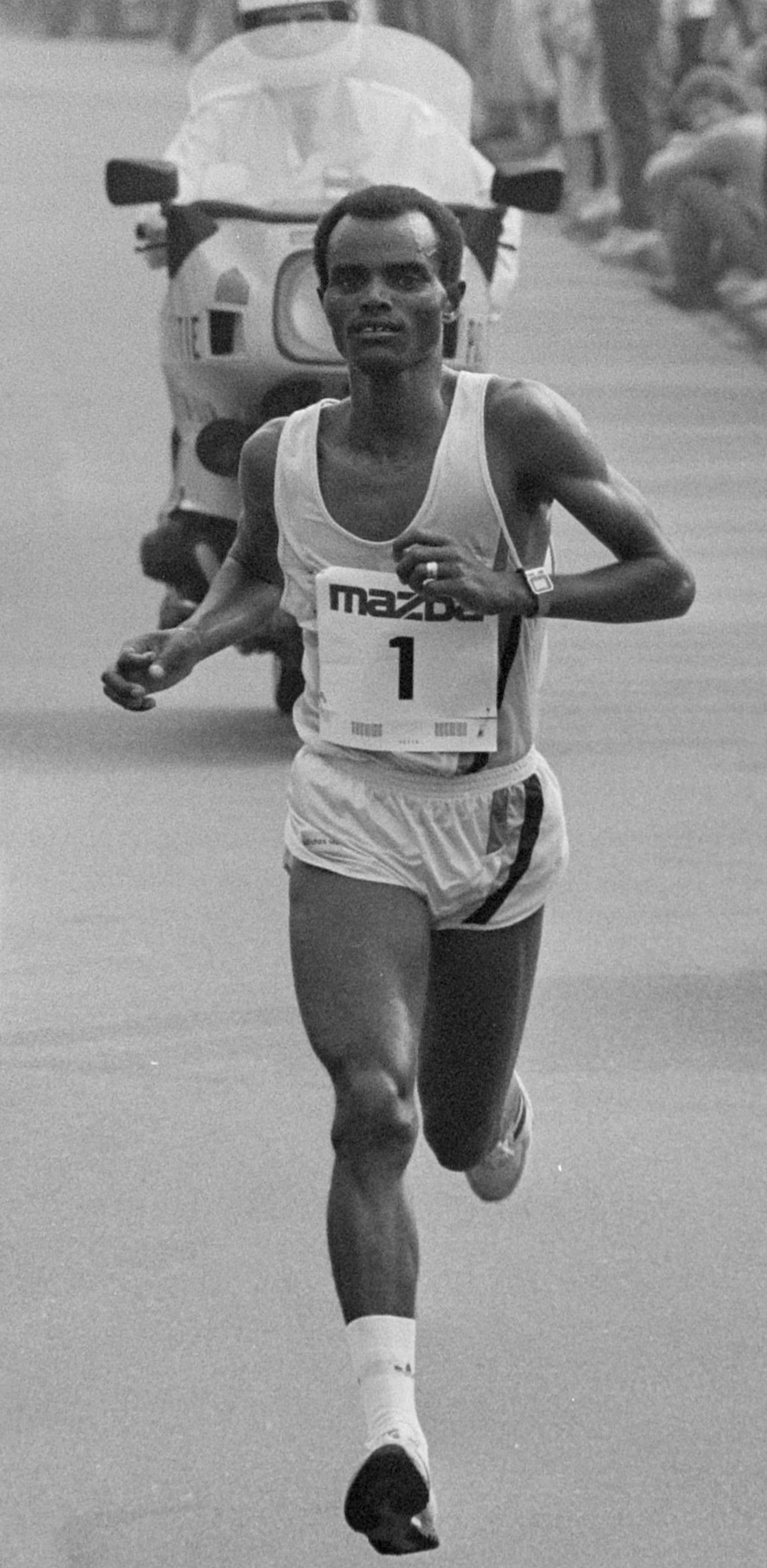
Belayneh Densamo

Belayneh Densamo (born 28 June 1965) is an Ethiopian former long-distance runner, and a long-period world record holder for the marathon discipline. He held the world record for 10 years (1988-1998).

== Early life ==
Belayneh was born in Diramo Afarrara in Sidamo, the southernmost province, and began first competing professionally at national level.

== Career ==
Densamo broke the world record by 22 seconds with a time of 2:06:50 at the 1988 Rotterdam Marathon, following three previous wins at major marathons 1986–1987. This record lasted the third-longest span ever recorded (and since the event was first professionally organized at the 1896 Olympics).

Last victories

Densamo won two major international marathons in 1989 and in 1990. He was not among the three Ethiopian men who entered the marathon in the 1992 Summer Olympics. He represented Ethiopia at the marathon at the 1996 Summer Olympics, as the world record holder in the relatively humid summer Atlanta, Georgia conditions and was among 13 of a field of 130 who did not finish. Densamo's world record fell to Ronaldo da Costa at the Berlin Marathon in 1998.

As of 2009, Belayneh lives in the area of Cambridge, Massachusetts and has retired from international competition.

== Achievements ==
- All results regarding marathon, unless stated otherwise

Year	Competition	Venue	Position	Notes
Representing Ethiopia
1986	Tokyo Marathon	Tokyo, Japan	2nd	2:08:29
1986	Rotterdam Marathon	Rotterdam, Netherlands	2nd	2:09:09
1986	Moscow Marathon	Moscow, Russia	1st	2:14:42
1987	All-Africa Games	Nairobi, Kenya	1st	2:14:47
1987	Rotterdam Marathon	Rotterdam, Netherlands	1st	2:12:58
1988	Rotterdam Marathon	Rotterdam, Netherlands	1st	2:06:50
1988	Fukuoka Marathon	Fukuoka, Japan	2nd	2:11:09
1989	Rotterdam Marathon	Rotterdam, Netherlands	1st	2:08:39
1990	Tokyo Marathon	Tokyo, Japan	3rd	2:11:32
1990	Fukuoka Marathon	Fukuoka, Japan	1st	2:11:35
1991	Rotterdam Marathon	Rotterdam, Netherlands	5th	2:11:34
1993	Beijing Marathon	Beijing, China	3rd	2:12:11
1996	Marrakech Marathon	Marrakesh, Morocco	3rd	2:12:27
1996	Rotterdam Marathon	Rotterdam, Netherlands	1st	2:10:30

Records
Preceded by (Portugal) Carlos Lopes	Men's Marathon World Record Holder; 17 April 1988 – 20 September 1998	Succeeded by (Brazil) Ronaldo da Costa
