= Swimming at the 1995 Pan American Games =

- Dates: March 12–18

Swimming at the 12th Pan American Games took place March 12–18, 1995 in Mar del Plata, Argentina. Competition was held in a long course (50 m) pool.

== Results ==
=== Men's events ===
Event	Gold		Silver		Bronze	
50 m freestyle	Fernando Scherer; Brazil	22.65	Bill Pilczuk (United States) USA	22.71	Tom Jager (United States) USA	22.75
100 m freestyle	Gustavo Borges; Brazil	49.31; GR	Jon Olsen (United States) USA	49.39	Fernando Scherer; Brazil	49.79
200 m freestyle	Gustavo Borges; Brazil	1:48.49	Greg Burgess (United States) USA	1:51.69	Josh Davis (United States) USA	1:51.92
400 m freestyle	Josh Davis (United States) USA	3:55.59	Luiz Lima; Brazil	3:56.33	Jon Sakovich (United States) USA	3:57.37
1500 m freestyle	Carlton Bruner (United States) USA	15:13.90	Luiz Lima; Brazil	15:19.53	Ryan Cox (United States) USA	15:37.28
100 m backstroke	Jeff Rouse (United States) USA	54.74; GR	Tripp Schwenk (United States) USA	55.60	Rodolfo Falcón; Cuba	56.13
200 m backstroke	Brad Bridgewater (United States) USA	2:00.79	Rodolfo Falcón; Cuba	2:00.98	Rogério Romero; Brazil	2:01.13
100 m breaststroke	Seth Van Neerden (United States) USA	1:02.48	Jonathan Cleveland; Canada	1:03.01	Tyler Mayfield (United States) USA	1:03.17
200 m breaststroke	Seth Van Neerden (United States) USA	2:16.08	Eric Namesnik (United States) USA	2:17.70	Curtis Myden; Canada	2:19.00
100 m butterfly	Mark Henderson (United States) USA	54.11	Eduardo Piccinini; Brazil	54.63	Brian Alderman (United States) USA	54.75
200 m butterfly	Nelson Mora; Venezuela	2:00.38	Tom Malchow (United States) USA	2:00.49	André Teixeira; Brazil	2:01.95
200 m I.M.	Curtis Myden; Canada	2:01.70	Greg Burgess (United States) USA	2:03.62	Eric Namesnik (United States) USA	2:03.70
400 m I.M.	Curtis Myden; Canada	4:18.55	Eric Namesnik (United States) USA	4:19.00	Iain Mull (United States) USA	4:26.32
4 × 100 m Free Relay	United States; Gary Hall Jr. Tom Jager; Josh Davis; Jon Olsen	3:18.60; GR	Brazil; Fernando Scherer; Gustavo Borges; Eduardo Piccinini; Roberto Piovesan	3:20.33	Venezuela; Diego Henao; Alejandro Carrizo; Michael Lilinthal; Francisco Sánchez	3:25.43
4 × 200 m Free Relay	United States; Jon Olsen; Josh Davis; Ryan Berube; Greg Burgess	7:21.61; GR	Brazil; Fernando Saez; Gustavo Borges; Cassiano Leal; Teófilo Ferreira	7:28.70	Mexico; Oscar Sotelo; Nelson Vargas; José Castellanos; Jorge Anaya	7:39.56
4 × 100 m Medley Relay	United States; Jeff Rouse; Seth Van Neerden; Mark Henderson; Jon Olsen	3:41.24	Brazil; Rogério Romero; Oscar Godoi; Eduardo Piccinini; Gustavo Borges	3:43.93	Canada; Chris Renaud; Jonathan Cleveland; Edward Parenti; Curtis Myden	3:45.10

=== Women's events ===
Event	Gold		Silver		Bronze	
50 m freestyle	Angel Martino (United States) USA	25.40; GR	Shannon Shakespeare; Canada	26.19	Andrea Moody; Canada	26.54
100 m freestyle	Angel Martino (United States) USA	55.62	Amy Van Dyken (United States) USA	55.92	Marianne Limpert; Canada	56.80
200 m freestyle	Cristina Teuscher (United States) USA	2:01.49	Marianne Limpert; Canada	2:02.05	Dady Vincent (United States) USA	2:03.37
400 m freestyle	Brooke Bennett (United States) USA	4:11.78	Cristina Teuscher (United States) USA	4:13.97	Katie Brambley; Canada	4:18.74
800 m freestyle	Trina Jackson (United States) USA	8:35.42	Brooke Bennett (United States) USA	8:47.99	Alicia Barrancos; Argentina	8:49.57
100 m backstroke	BJ Bedford (United States) USA	1:01.71; GR	Kristy Heydanek (United States) USA	1:03.10	Fabíola Molina; Brazil	1:04.85
200 m backstroke	BJ Bedford (United States) USA	2:12.98; GR	Rachel Joseph (United States) USA	2:14.74	Joanne Malar; Canada	2:16.67
100 m breaststroke	Lisa Flood; Canada	1:10.36	Guylaine Cloutier; Canada	1:10.44	Kelli King-Bednar (United States) USA	1:11.44
200 m breaststroke	Lisa Flood; Canada	2:31.33	Guylaine Cloutier; Canada	2:32.42	Anita Nall (United States) USA	2:32.83
100 m butterfly	Amy Van Dyken (United States) USA	1:00.71	Gabrielle Rose; Brazil	1:01.67	Angie Wester-Krieg (United States) USA	1:02.79
200 m butterfly	Trina Jackson (United States) USA	2:12.37	Michelle Griglione (United States) USA	2:14.94	María Pereyra; Argentina	2:18.52
200 m I.M.	Joanne Malar; Canada	2:15.66; GR	Marianne Limpert; Canada	2:16.13	Alison Fealey (United States) USA	2:17.14
400 m I.M.	Joanne Malar; Canada	4:43.64	Alison Fealey (United States) USA	4:48.31	Jenny Kurth (United States) USA	4:57.24
4 × 100 m Free Relay	United States; Angel Martino; Amy Van Dyken; Lindsey Farella; Cristina Teuscher	3:44.71; GR	Canada; Shannon Shakespeare; Katie Brambley; Joanne Malar; Marianne Limpert	3:49.26	Brazil; Gabrielle Rose; Raquel Takaya; Paula Marsiglia; Paula Carvalho Aguiar	3:52.85
4 × 200 m Free Relay	United States; Trina Jackson; Dady Vincent; Catherine Fox; Cristina Teuscher	8:07.30	Canada; Katie Brambley; Marianne Limpert; Shannon Shakespeare; Joanne Malar	8:08.25	Argentina; Alicia Barrancos; María Pereyra; Natalia Scapinello; María Garrone	8:27.87
4 × 100 m Medley Relay	United States; BJ Bedford; Kelli King Bednar; Amy Van Dyken; Angel Martino	4:08.17; GR	Canada; Joanne Malar; Lisa Flood; Shannon Shakespeare; Marianne Limpert	4:19.06	Brazil; Patrícia Comini; Fabíola Molina; Gabrielle Rose; Paula Carvalho Aguiar	4:22.08

== Medal standings ==
Rank	Nation	Gold	Silver	Bronze	Total
1	United States	22	15	14	51
2	Canada	6	9	6	21
3	Brazil	3	7	6	16
4	Venezuela	1	0	1	2
5	Cuba	0	1	1	2
6	Argentina	0	0	3	3
7	Mexico	0	0	1	1
Totals (7 entries)		32	32	32	96
