= Mark Henderson (swimmer) =

American swimmer

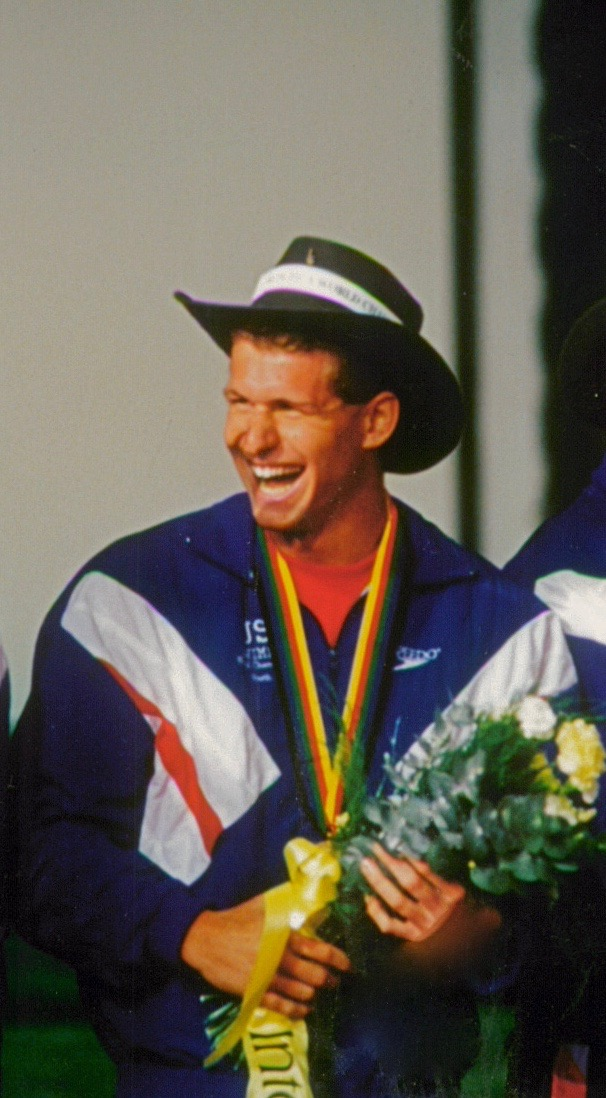

Personal information
- Full name: Mark Andrew Henderson
- National team: United States
- Born: November 14, 1969 (age 56) Washington, D.C., U.S.
- Height: 6 ft 2 in (188 cm)
- Weight: 194 lb (88 kg)
- Spouse: Tamara Henderson
- Relatives: Brooke and Brady (children)

Sport
- Sport: Swimming
- Strokes: Butterfly, Freestyle, Backstroke
- Club: Nation's Capital Swim Club
- College team: University of California, Berkeley
- Coach: Jeff King, Nort Thornton
Medal record
Men's swimming
Representing the United States
Olympic Games
Gold medal – first place	1996 Atlanta	4×100 m medley
World Championships (LC)
Gold medal – first place	1991 Perth	4×100 m medley
Gold medal – first place	1994 Rome	4×100 m medley
World Championships (SC)
Gold medal – first place	1993 Palma	4×100 m medley
Silver medal – second place	1993 Palma	100 m butterfly
Silver medal – second place	1993 Palma	4×100 m freestyle
Pan Pacific Championships
Gold medal – first place	1991 Edmonton	4×100 m medley
Gold medal – first place	1993 Kobe	100 m butterfly
Gold medal – first place	1993 Kobe	4×100 m medley
Gold medal – first place	1995 Atlanta	4×100 m medley
Silver medal – second place	1995 Atlanta	100 m butterfly
Bronze medal – third place	1989 Tokyo	100 m butterfly
Bronze medal – third place	1991 Edmonton	100 m butterfly
Pan American Games
Gold medal – first place	1995 Mar del Plata	100 m butterfly
Gold medal – first place	1995 Mar del Plata	4×100 m medley

Mark Andrew Henderson (born November 14, 1969) is a United States Olympic champion and former world record-holder. He is an Olympic gold medalist, three-time World champion, two-time Pan American Games champion, four-time Pan Pacific champion and five-time U.S. National champion. He competed at the 1996 Olympic Games in Atlanta, where he was the butterfly leg of the gold medal 4×100-meter medley relay, which set the World, Olympic, American, and U.S. Open records. He was on the U.S. National Swim Team for over 9 years.

== Career ==
Before his high school years, Olympic champion Mark Henderson swam for the Fort Washington Pool Sharks in the Prince-Monte Swim League in Fort Washington, Prince George's County, Maryland, where he still holds records in the 10-year-old & Under 25-meter Butterfly in 1980 and the 15-18-year-old 100 Freestyle in 1988. While in high school, Henderson swam for Curl-Burke Swim Club (Now known as the Nation's Capital Swim Club) and was coached by Jeff King. He credits his success to his Coach Jeff King, his parents and the people he trained with. He attended college at the University of California, Berkeley where he swam for coach Nort Thornton's California Golden Bears swimming and diving team.

At the U.S. Olympic Trials in 1992, Henderson entered the meet ranked 2nd in the world in the 100m butterfly but concentrated too much on his competition's race strategy and breaking the world record, which resulted in him taking out his race much too fast (under world record pace at the 50m mark). He led the race to the final 10 meters, where he "bonked" and dropped from first to seventh place. It was a turning point in his life, though.

Henderson returned to competition after an 8-month retirement with a vengeance. In 1993, Henderson won gold at the U.S. Open and Summer U.S. Nationals and another two gold medals at the Pan Pacific Championships. He finished his comeback year with a gold and two silvers at the inaugural Short Course World Championships in Palma, Majorca.

In 1994, Henderson joined the first USA Swimming resident team, which was located at the Olympic Training Center in Colorado Springs, Colorado. It was run and coached by former world record holder Jonty Skinner. Over the next two years, Skinner coached Henderson to two National titles, a gold at the World Championships, a gold and silver at the Pan Pacific Championships and two Pan American Gold medals. Henderson found redemption at the 1996 Olympic Trials by qualifying for the team in the 100-meter butterfly.

Upon his retirement from swimming, Henderson worked in the financial industry, concentrating on Japan and U.S. equities for 16 years for the likes of JP Morgan Securities, Citigroup, and Janney Montgomery Scott. Part of that time he spent living in Tokyo, Japan. Mark retired from Wall Street in 2016 and started a company called The Athletes Village, which focused on leveling the playing field for athletes by sharing valuable training and competition information for free. They did this by providing an easy way for elite athletes and experts in all fields of sports (coaching, parenting, nutrition, psychology, strength training, injury prevention, etc.) an easy way to connect and give back to young athletes around the world. The platform reached athletes, parents, and coaches in over 30 countries within four years of being online.

He now divides his time between Florida and Bend, OR. Mark is a partner at a financial advisory firm (Westhoff-Henderson Group - a subsidiary of Raymond James) that specializes in high-net-worth individuals/families and professional athletes.

== Personal ==
Mark started dating Summer Sanders in 1994 while training at the U.S.A. Olympic Training Center in Colorado Springs, CO. He proposed to her two years later on the field at the closing ceremonies of the 1996 Olympic Games. They were married from 1997 to 2001.

Mark met Tamara Blanchard in San Francisco in 2004, and the two were married in 2006. They have two children: Brooke and Brady, a Black Labrador (Hank), a Double Dapple Dachshund (Gator), and a Catahoula leopard dog (Lax). Mark and his family live in Bend, Oregon and Bradenton, Florida, where they spend their free time hiking, mountain biking, skiing, snowboarding, and wakeboarding. Both kids are attending IMG Academy as lacrosse players.

== Charitable endeavors ==
Since his retirement from competitive swimming, Henderson has been a member of USA Swimming's Athlete Executive Council (AEC) (2000–2008), USA Swimming Board member (2000–2008), United States Olympic Committee Athlete Advisory Council (AAC) member (2000–2008), Chair of the AAC (2004–2008), current Board member of the Leo Brien Foundation, Olympic solidarity representative to Zimbabwe (2000–present), Co-founder of S.W.I.M (Swim With Inspiration and Motivation) learn-to-swim program for inner-city youth in San Francisco, and he is also a participant/ member in the Big Brothers Big Sisters of America (1988–present) and Swim Across America. In 2008, Henderson was the recipient of the USA Swimming Athlete Appreciation Award. Mark has also been very active in giving back to the global swimming community by answering questions from athletes, parents and coaches located all over the world on the platform. He is currently a member of the Board of Trustees of the Women's Sports Foundation.

== See also ==
- List of Olympic medalists in swimming (men)
- List of University of California, Berkeley alumni
- List of World Aquatics Championships medalists in swimming (men)
- World record progression 4 × 100 metres medley relay
