= Swimming at the 1991 Pan American Games – Men's 100 metre freestyle =

Men's 100 metre freestyle at the 1991 Pan American Games
- Venue: -
- Dates: August 14 (preliminaries and finals)
- Competitors: from - nations

Medalists
Gold medal	Gustavo Borges	Brazil
Silver medal	Joel Thomas	United States
Bronze medal	Rodrigo González	Mexico

The men's 100 metre freestyle competition of the swimming events at the 1991 Pan American Games took place on 14 August. The last Pan American Games champion was Todd Dudley of US.

This race consisted of two lengths of the pool, both lengths being in freestyle.

It was the first time that the U.S. lost the gold medal in the men's 100 meter freestyle, after 10 straight titles. This feat fitted Gustavo Borges, who went on to win four Olympic medals after this.

== Results ==
All times are in minutes and seconds.

KEY:	q	Fastest non-qualifiers	Q	Qualified	GR	Games record	NR	National record	PB	Personal best	SB	Seasonal best

=== Final ===
The final was held on August 14.

Rank	Name	Nationality	Time	Notes
1st place, gold medalist(s)	Gustavo Borges	Brazil	49.48	GR
2nd place, silver medalist(s)	Joel Thomas	United States	50.55	
3rd place, bronze medalist(s)	Rodrigo González	Mexico	51.25	
4	Ricardo Busquets	Puerto Rico	51.28	
5	Bob Utley	United States	51.37	
6	Emanuel Nascimento	Brazil	51.63	
7	Giovanni Linscheer	Suriname	51.71	
8	Stephen Vandermeulen	Canada	52.10	
