= Carlton Bruner =

American swimmer (born 1972)

Personal information
- Full name: Thomas Carlton Bruner
- National team: United States
- Born: February 1, 1972 (age 54) Atlanta, Georgia, U.S.
- Height: 5 ft 9 in (1.75 m)
- Weight: 121 lb (55 kg)

Sport
- Sport: Swimming
- Strokes: Freestyle, individual medley
- Club: Dynamo Swim Club
- College team: University of Florida
Medal record
Men's swimming
Representing the United States
Pan Pacific Championships
Bronze medal – third place	1993 Kobe	1500 m freestyle
Bronze medal – third place	1995 Atlanta	1500 m freestyle
Pan American Games
Gold medal – first place	1995 Mar del Plata	1500m Freestyle

Thomas Carlton Bruner (born February 1, 1972) is an American former competition swimmer who specialized in long-distance freestyle events.

== Background ==
Bruner was born in Atlanta, Georgia in 1972, and he started his swimming career at the metropolitan Atlanta area Dynamo Swim Club.

Bruner accepted an athletic scholarship to attend the University of Florida in Gainesville, Florida, where he swam for the Florida Gators swimming and diving team in National Collegiate Athletic Association (NCAA) competition from 1991 to 1994. While swimming for the Gators, Bruner was a two-time NCAA champion, including the 1,500-meter freestyle in 1992 and the 1,650-yard freestyle in 1993, and received five All-American honors.

== Sport career ==
Bruner was considered to be one of the ten best 800-meter and 1500-meter freestyle swimmers in the world from 1992 to 1996. He placed third in both the 1993 and 1995 Pan Pacific Swimming Championships 1500-meter freestyle, and first in the 1995 Pan American Games, breaking the games record, in the same event. Bruner represented the United States at the 1996 Summer Olympics in his hometown of Atlanta, where he placed thirteenth in the 1500-meter freestyle event.

Bruner is a veteran celebrity swimmer for Swim Across America (SAA), a charitable organization that raises funds for cancer research, and has participated in SAA events since 2005.

== See also ==
- List of University of Florida alumni
- List of University of Florida Olympians
