= Athletics at the 1995 Pan American Games – Men's 10,000 metres =

Men's 10,000 metres at the Pan American Games

The men's 10,000 metres event at the 1995 Pan American Games was held at the Estadio Atletico "Justo Roman" on 18 March.

== Results ==
Rank	Name	Nationality	Time	Notes
1st place, gold medalist(s)	Armando Quintanilla	Mexico	28:57.41	
2nd place, silver medalist(s)	Valdenor dos Santos	Brazil	29:04.79	
3rd place, bronze medalist(s)	Ronaldo da Costa	Brazil	29:07.68	
4	Jorge Marquez	Mexico	29:08.69	
5	Steve Plasencia	United States	29:10.33	
6	Silvio Guerra	Ecuador	29:12.65	
7	Antonio Silio	Argentina	29:44.61	
8	Chris Fox	United States	29:56.54	
9	Mariano Mamani	Bolivia	30:02.42	
10	Aldo Pérez	Argentina	30:13.62	
	Rolando Vera	Ecuador	DNS	
