= Carlos Jayme =

Brazilian swimmer (born 1980)

Personal information
- Full name: Carlos Alberto Borges Jayme
- National team: Brazil
- Born: 13 June 1980 (age 46) Goiânia, Goiás, Brazil
- Height: 1.91 m (6 ft 3 in)
- Weight: 90 kg (198 lb)

Sport
- Sport: Swimming
- Strokes: Freestyle
- Club: Pinheiros
- College team: University of Florida
Medal record
Men's swimming
Representing Brazil
Olympic Games
Bronze medal – third place	2000 Sydney	4×100 m freestyle
Pan American Games
Gold medal – first place	2003 Santo D.	4×100 m freestyle
Silver medal – second place	2003 Santo D.	4×200 m freestyle

Carlos Alberto Borges Jayme (born 13 June 1980) is a former competition swimmer from Brazil. Jayme was a freestyle specialist and an Olympic bronze medalist.

== Early years ==
Jayme was born in Goiânia, Goiás, Brazil.

== International career ==
The end of 1998 was marked by the third consecutive world record broke by Brazilian relay in the 4×100-metre freestyle, on short course. On 20 December, shortly after the end of Jose Finkel Trophy, the quartet formed by Fernando Scherer, Carlos Jayme, Alexandre Massura and Gustavo Borges, in order, fell the pool at Club de Regatas Vasco da Gama and they got the 3:10.45 time, that would only be broken in the year 2000 by the team of Sweden.

Jayme competed for Brazil in the 2000 Summer Olympics in Sydney, Australia, and the 2004 Summer Olympics in Athens, Greece. At the 2000 Olympics, he was a member of the Brazilian men's team that won the bronze medal in the 4×100-metre freestyle relay, together with Fernando Scherer, Gustavo Borges and Edvaldo Valério.

At the 2002 FINA World Swimming Championships (25 m) in Moscow, Russia, he was in the 4×100-metre freestyle final, ranking 5th, and went to the semifinals of the 100-metre freestyle, finishing in 13th place.

Jayme was at the 2003 World Aquatics Championships in Barcelona, Spain, where he placed 12th in the 4×100-metre freestyle and 9th in 4×200-metre freestyle

Participating in 2003 Pan American Games, won gold in the 4×100-metre freestyle, and silver in the 4×200-metre freestyle.

He was also in 2004 Summer Olympics, where he finished 9th in 4×200-metre freestyle, and 12th in the 4×100-metre freestyle.

== College career ==
Jayme received an athletic scholarship to attend the University of Florida in Gainesville, Florida, where he swam for coach Gregg Troy's Florida Gators swimming and diving team in National Collegiate Athletic Association (NCAA) competition from 2000 to 2004. During his four years as a Gator swimmer, Jayme received twenty-six All-American honors, the second most of any male swimmer in Gators history. He graduated from the University of Florida with a bachelor's degree in food and resource economics in 2005.

== See also ==
- List of Olympic medalists in swimming (men)
- List of University of Florida alumni
- List of University of Florida Olympians
- World record progression 4 × 100 metres freestyle relay
