= Eric Diehl =

American swimmer

Personal information
- Born: June 25, 1973 (age 53)
- Height: 5 ft 10 in (178 cm)

Sport
- Country: United States
- Sport: Swimming
- Event: Freestyle
Medal record
Pan American Games
Gold medal – first place	1991 Havana	200 m freestyle
Gold medal – first place	1991 Havana	4 × 200 m freestyle
Bronze medal – third place	1991 Havana	400 m freestyle

Eric Diehl is an American former freestyle swimmer of the 1990s.

== Life ==
Diehl grew up in Fort Worth, Texas, and is of Luxembourgian descent. At the age of 15, he moved with his mother to Mission Viejo, California for training purposes and he completed his schooling at Mission Viejo High.

== Career ==
In 1990, Diehl earned a place on the U.S. team for the Goodwill Games after winning the 1,000 m freestyle at the short course national championships. He came eighth in the 800 m freestyle at the Goodwill Games, held in Seattle.

Diehl was the 200 m freestyle gold medalist at the 1991 Pan American Games in Havana, setting a games record. He also took bronze in the 400 m freestyle and swam on the gold medal-winning 4 × 200 m freestyle relay team.

While attending Stanford University, Diehl competed in varsity swimming for the Cardinal.
