= Swimming at the 1991 Pan American Games – Men's 400 metre freestyle =

Men's 400 metre freestyle at the 1991 Pan American Games
- Venue: -
- Dates: August 16 (preliminaries and finals)
- Competitors: from - nations

Medalists
Gold medal	Sean Killion	United States
Silver medal	Jorge Herrera	Puerto Rico
Bronze medal	Eric Diehl	United States

The men's 400 metre freestyle competition of the swimming events at the 1991 Pan American Games took place on 16 August. The last Pan American Games champion was Paul Robinson of US.

This race consisted of eight lengths of the pool, with all eight being in the freestyle stroke.

== Results ==
All times are in minutes and seconds.

KEY:	q	Fastest non-qualifiers	Q	Qualified	GR	Games record	NR	National record	PB	Personal best	SB	Seasonal best

=== Final ===
The final was held on August 16.

Rank	Name	Nationality	Time	Notes
1st place, gold medalist(s)	Sean Killion	United States	3:50.38	GR
2nd place, silver medalist(s)	Jorge Herrera	Puerto Rico	3:54.91	
3rd place, bronze medalist(s)	Eric Diehl	United States	3:58.06	
4	Pedro Carrío	Cuba	3:59.60	
5	Robbie McFarlane	Canada	3:59.89	
6	Gabriel Chaillou	Argentina	4:02.40	
7	Carlos Scanavino	Uruguay	4:02.56	
8	Sean Swain	Canada	4:06.48	
