= Athletics at the 1995 Pan American Games – Men's 400 metres hurdles =

Men's 400 metres hurdles at the Pan American Games

The men's 400 metres hurdles event at the 1995 Pan American Games was held at the Estadio Atletico "Justo Roman" on 24 March.

== Results ==
Rank	Name	Nationality	Time	Notes
1st place, gold medalist(s)	Eronilde de Araújo	Brazil	49.29	
2nd place, silver medalist(s)	Everson Teixeira	Brazil	50.24	
3rd place, bronze medalist(s)	Llimy Rivas	Colombia	50.37	
4	Juan Gutiérrez	Mexico	50.44	
5	Marco Morgan	United States	52.67	
6	Miguel Pérez	Argentina	52.73	
7	Thomas Zverina	Canada	53.27	
8	Gabriel Corradini	Argentina	55.34	
