= Todd Pace =

American swimmer

Personal information
- Full name: Todd H. Pace
- National team: USA
- Born: July 23, 1968 (age 58) Houston, Texas, United States
- Education: SMU BS Economics 1990; Nova Southeastern MBA 2003
- Occupations: Business and Sales Admin., Healthcare

Sport
- Sport: Swimming
- Event: 50, 100 freestyle
- Strokes: Freestyle
- Club: Cypress Fairbanks Swim Club
- College team: Southern Methodist University
Medal record
Representing United States
Pan American Games
Gold medal – first place	1991 Havana	50m freestyle

Todd Pace is an American competitive swimmer who competed for Southern Methodist University. He was a member of the US national swim team, competing in sprint events for over six years at the international level.

== Early life ==
Pace was born around July 23, 1968 in greater Houston, Texas, and began swimming with Cypress Fairbanks Swim Club by 1984, around the age of 16. At Cypress Fairbanks, he was coached in 1968 by Clayton Cagle. He attended Westfield High School in the Spring Independent School District in Houston, TX and was on the varsity team specializing in freestyle. In March, 1986, competing for Westfield High in the University Interscholastic League State Championships, Pace won the 50-yard freestyle in a time of 20.35.2, and the 100 freestyle in a time of 45.39.

== Education, swim career ==
Pace attended Southern Methodist University from around 1987-1990. In 1990, he set a school record in the 50 yard freestyle, which stood through 1996. After college, Pace was a U.S. national team member from 1989 to 1995. During those years, he competed at meets in 10 different countries. He won the 50-meter freestyle event at the Pan American Games in 1991. At SMU, Pace attended the Cox School of Business and received a B.S. with a major in Economics and Applied Finance, graduating around 1990.

He later earned an MBA at NOVA Southeastern University, graduating in 2003.

Pace worked for over 20 years as a Business Manager, often in sales, primarily for companies in healthcare and Medical device related fields, specializing in the area of fluorescence imaging.

Staying active in swimming between the ages of 36-54, Todd intermittently participated in United States Masters Swimming competitions representing Gold Coast Masters in Coral Springs, Florida, competing primarily in Breaststroke, Freestyle, and Butterfly events.

Best Times: 50yd Freestyle: 19.72 100yd Freestyle: 44.20 50m Freestyle: 22.52 100m Freestyle: 50.99

=== Honors ===
As a result of his two High School state championship titles, Pace was named a 1986 Class 5A Swimmer of the Year.
