= Wander Moura =

Brazilian long-distance runner

Personal information
- Born: 22 February 1969 (age 57)

Sport
- Sport: Track and field
Medal record
Representing Brazil
Pan American Games
Gold medal – first place	1995 Mar del Plata	3000m steeplechase
Silver medal – second place	1995 Mar del Plata	5000m

Wander do Prado Moura (born 22 February 1969) is a retired long-distance runner from Brazil, who won the gold medal in the men's 3000 metres steeplechase at the 1995 Pan American Games in Mar del Plata, Argentina. His winning time of 8:14.41 at the event was a Games record, Brazilian record and a South American record for the event. He is holding the 2000 meters steeplechase under 20 Years old South American and Brazilian record, 5:34.16 since 1988.

He went to the final in the world championship junior in 1988 in the 3000 meters steeplechase, 4th place sudbury Canada. Second place in the 2000 steeplechase in Quito, Ecuador, 1986 in high-altitude conditions with a time of 6:16.34. First place in the South American in the 2000 meters steeplechase under 20 5:46.26 Santiago do Chile in 1987.

He competed at the 1993 World Championships in Athletics, representing Brazil, but did not manage to progress to the steeplechase final. He had success at continental level, however, and won a silver medal at the South American Championships in Athletics in 1991 and became the continental champion in 1997.

== International competitions ==
8 Times Brazilian champion in 3000 steeplechase

Year	Competition	Venue	Position	Event	Notes
Representing Brazil
1986	South American Junior Championships	Quito, Ecuador	2nd	2,000 m steeple	6:16.5
1988	World Junior Championships	Sudbury, Canada	4th	3,000 m steeple	8:48.16
1991	South American Championships	Manaus, Brazil	2nd	3,000 m steeple	8:49.11
1995	Pan American Games	Mar del Plata, Argentina	2nd	5,000 m	13:45.53
1995	Pan American Games	Mar del Plata, Argentina	1st	3,000 m steeple	8:14.41
1996	World Road Relay Championships	Copenhagen, Denmark	2nd	Marathon relay	2:01:24
1997	South American Championships	Mar del Plata, Argentina	1st	3,000 m steeple	8:35.40

== Records ==
- 1500m: 3:41.84 Triton Stadium Meeting Record San Diego CA USA - 1500m
- 3000m steeplecahse: 8:14:41 South American Record, Brazilian Record and Pan American Games Record since 1995
- 5000m: 13:36:86 Triton Stadium Meeting Record San Diego CA USA - 5000m
