= 1993 FINA World Swimming Championships (25 m) – Men's 100 metre freestyle =

The finals and the qualifying heats of the Men's 100 metres Freestyle event at the 1993 FINA Short Course World Championships were held on 3 December 1993 in Palma de Mallorca, Spain.

== Finals ==
RANK	FINAL A	TIME
	Fernando Scherer (BRA)	48.38
	Gustavo Borges (BRA)	48.42
	Jon Olsen (USA)	48.49
4.	Christian Tröger (GER)	48.76
5.	Tommy Werner (SWE)	48.79
6.	Anders Holmertz (SWE)	48.82
7.	Seth Pepper (USA)	49.14
8.	Robert Abernethy (AUS)	49.29

== Qualifying heats ==
RANK	HEATS RANKING	TIME
1.	Jon Olsen (USA)	48.29
2.	Fernando Scherer (BRA)	48.52
3.	Gustavo Borges (BRA)	48.98
4.	Christian Tröger (GER)	49.06
5.	Anders Holmertz (SWE)	49.08
6.	Seth Pepper (USA)	49.13
7.	Tommy Werner (SWE)	49.18
8.	Robert Abernethy (AUS)	49.91

== See also ==
- 1992 Men's Olympic Games 100m Freestyle
- 1993 Men's European LC Championships 100m Freestyle
