= Swimming at the 1991 Pan American Games – Men's 200 metre freestyle =

Men's 200 metre freestyle at the 1991 Pan American Games
- Venue: -
- Dates: August 12 (preliminaries and finals)
- Competitors: from - nations

Medalists
Gold medal	Eric Diehl	United States
Silver medal	Gustavo Borges	Brazil
Bronze medal	René Sáez	Cuba

The men's 200 metre freestyle competition of the swimming events at the 1991 Pan American Games took place on 12 August. The last Pan American Games champion was John Witchel of US.

This race consisted of four lengths of the pool, all in freestyle.

== Results ==
All times are in minutes and seconds.

KEY:	q	Fastest non-qualifiers	Q	Qualified	GR	Games record	NR	National record	PB	Personal best	SB	Seasonal best

=== Final ===
The final was held on August 12.

Rank	Name	Nationality	Time	Notes
1st place, gold medalist(s)	Eric Diehl	United States	1:49.67	GR
2nd place, silver medalist(s)	Gustavo Borges	Brazil	1:49.74	
3rd place, bronze medalist(s)	René Sáez	Cuba	1:52.14	NR
4	Paul Szekula	Canada	1:52.27	
5	Pedro Carrío	Cuba	1:52.53	
6	Jim Wells	United States	1:52.71	
7	Jorge Herrera	Puerto Rico	1:53.21	
8	Sean Swain	Canada	1:54.17	
