= 1993 FINA World Swimming Championships (25 m) – Men's 200 metre freestyle =

The finals and the qualifying heats of the Men's 200 metres Freestyle event at the 1993 FINA Short Course World Championships were held in Palma de Mallorca, Spain.

== Finals ==
RANK	FINAL A	TIME
	Antti Kasvio (FIN)	1:45.21
	Trent Bray (NZL)	1:45.53
	Artur Wojdat (POL)	1:45.53
4.	Anders Holmertz (SWE)	1:45.63
5.	Gustavo Borges (BRA)	1:46.71
6.	Pier Maria Siciliano (ITA)	1:47.06
7.	Jon Olsen (USA)	1:47.40
8.	Christian Tröger (GER)	1:47.70

== Qualifying heats ==
RANK	HEATS RANKING	TIME
1.	Trent Bray (NZL)	1:46.21
2.	Artur Wojdat (POL)	1:46.71
3.	Anders Holmertz (SWE)	1:47.49
4.	Gustavo Borges (BRA)	1:47.53
5.	Antti Kasvio (FIN)	1:47.89
6.	Pier Maria Siciliano (ITA)	1:48.30
7.	Christian Tröger (GER)	1:48.40
8.	Jon Olsen (USA)	1:48.44

== See also ==
- 1992 Men's Olympic Games 200m Freestyle
- 1993 Men's European LC Championships 200m Freestyle
