= Ronaldo da Costa =

Brazilian long-distance runner

Personal information
- Born: 7 June 1970 (age 56) Descoberto, Minas Gerais, Brazil

Sport
- Sport: Track and field
Medal record
Representing Brazil
World Half Marathon Championships
Bronze medal – third place	1994 Oslo	Half marathon
Pan American Games
Bronze medal – third place	1995 Mar del Plata	10,000m

Ronaldo da Costa (born 7 June 1970) is a Brazilian former long-distance runner and former world-record holder for the marathon distance.

== Career ==
Da Costa broke the ten-year-old marathon world record in 1998 in Berlin, having been fifth-placed in the previous year. The record had been held by Belayneh Densamo from Ethiopia at the Rotterdam Marathon in April 1988. The record fell in the following year, almost eleven months later. During his record run, Da Costa was also the first man to officially reach the 40 km mark under two hours. He arrived at the 40K split in 1:59:55.

The youngest of eleven children, Da Costa became a national hero after winning the internationally competed São Silvestre Brazilian road race (15 km) in 1994. The same year he won the 5,000 m in the Ibero-American Championships entered by south-western European, Central and South American countries. From 1997, aged 27, until 2003, Da Costa achieved top-20 results in four marathons; however, unlike most marathon record holders, he did not win any international marathons apart from his world-record-breaking run.

== Achievements ==
Year	Competition	Venue	Position	Event	Notes
Representing Brazil
1993	South American Championships	Lima, Peru	1st	5000 m	13:58.7
1994	World Half Marathon Championships	Oslo, Norway	3rd	Half marathon	60:00.54
1994	Ibero-American Championships	Mar del Plata, Argentina	1st	5000m	13:47.99
1994	Ibero-American Championships	Mar del Plata, Argentina	2nd	10,000m	28:18.26
1995	Pan American Games	Mar del Plata, Argentina	7th	5000 m	14:01.47
1995	Pan American Games	Mar del Plata, Argentina	3rd	10,000 m	29:07.68
1995	South American Championships	Manaus, Brazil	1st	5000 m	13:51.66
1996	Olympic Games	Atlanta, Georgia	16th	10,000 m	29:26.58
1997	Berlin Marathon	Berlin, Germany	5th	Marathon	2:09:07
1998	Berlin Marathon	Berlin, Germany	1st	Marathon	2:06:05 WR
1998	World Half Marathon Championships	Uster, Switzerland	12th	Half marathon	61:04.54
1999	London Marathon	London, England	17th	Marathon	2:14:10
2002	Berlin Marathon	Berlin, Germany	16th	Marathon	2:12:52
2003	Tokyo Marathon	Tokyo, Japan	17th	Marathon	2:20:57

Records
Preceded by (Ethiopia) Belayneh Dinsamo	Men's Marathon World Record Holder; 20 September 1998 – 24 October 1999	Succeeded by (Morocco) Khalid Khannouchi
