= Jon Sakovich =

Guamanian-American swimmer (born 1970)

Personal information
- Full name: Jonathan Dehe Sakovich
- Nickname: "Jon"
- National team: Guam, United States
- Born: June 26, 1970 (age 56) Hilo, Hawaiʻi
- Height: 5 ft 10 in (1.78 m)
- Weight: 163 lb (74 kg)

Sport
- Sport: Swimming
- Strokes: Freestyle
- Club: Saipan Swim Club
- College team: University of Florida
Medal record
Men's swimming
Representing United States
Pan Am Games
Bronze medal – third place	1995 Mar del Plata	400m Freestyle

Jonathan Dehe Sakovich (/səˈkoʊvɪtʃ/ sə-KOH-vitch; born June 26, 1970) is a former competition swimmer from Saipan who has represented Guam and the United States at international events. At the 1988 Olympics he represented Guam, where he set the Guam records in the 400-meter and 1,500-meter freestyle and 400-meter individual medley, all three of which still stand as of May 2009.

Sakovich accepted an athletic scholarship to attend the University of Florida in Gainesville, Florida, where he swam for coach Randy Reese and coach Skip Foster's Florida Gators swimming and diving teams in National Collegiate Athletic Association (NCAA) competition from 1989 to 1992. During his NCAA career, he received seven All-American honors. Sakovich graduated from the University of Florida with a bachelor's degree in health and human performance in 1997.

Later in his swimming career, he represented the United States in such international competitions as the 1995 Pan American Games.

He was the head coach and aquatics director at the Bolles School in Jacksonville, Florida from 2015 until 2018. Sakovich received his master's degree in education, sport coaching, and pedagogy from Ohio University in 2019. LSU Tigers head coach Rick Bishop hired Sakovich as an associate head coach in 2021.

== See also ==
- List of University of Florida alumni
- List of University of Florida Olympians
