= Athletics at the 1995 Pan American Games – Men's 5000 metres =

Men's 5000 metres at the Pan American Games

The men's 5000 metres event at the 1995 Pan American Games was held at the Estadio Atletico "Justo Roman" on 25 March.

== Results ==
Rank	Name	Nationality	Time	Notes
1st place, gold medalist(s)	Armando Quintanilla	Mexico	13:30.35	
2nd place, silver medalist(s)	Wander Moura	Brazil	13:45.53	
3rd place, bronze medalist(s)	Silvio Guerra	Ecuador	13:52.29	
4	Tim Hacker	United States	13:52.52	
5	Iván Gómez	Guatemala	13:58.73	NR
6	Ronnie Harris	United States	14:00.39	
7	Ronaldo da Costa	Brazil	14:01.47	
8	Daniel Castro	Argentina	14:02.47	
9	Margarito Zamora	Mexico	14:05.07	
10	Steve Agar	Dominica	14:08.54	
11	Oscar Amaya	Argentina	14:19.01	
12	Marco Condori	Bolivia	14:20.40	
13	Robert Donker	Canada	14:24.31	
	Neehal Philogene	Dominica	DNF	
	Steve Boyd	Canada	DNS	
	Eddy Punina	Ecuador	DNS	
	Quintin John	Trinidad and Tobago	DNS	
