= Greg Burgess =

American swimmer (born 1972)

Personal information
- Full name: Gregory Stewart Burgess
- National team: United States
- Born: January 11, 1972 (age 54) Baltimore, Maryland, U.S.
- Height: 6 ft 4 in (1.93 m)
- Weight: 161 lb (73 kg)

Sport
- Sport: Swimming
- Strokes: Freestyle, individual medley
- Club: Bolles Sharks
- College team: University of Florida
Medal record
Men's swimming
Representing the United States
Olympic Games
| Silver medal – second place | 1992 Barcelona | 200 m medley |
World Championships (LC)
| Silver medal – second place | 1994 Rome | 200 m medley |
Pan Pacific Championships
| Gold medal – first place | 1993 Kobe | 4x200 m freestyle |
| Silver medal – second place | 1993 Kobe | 200 m medley |
Pan American Games
| Gold medal – first place | 1995 Mar del Plata | 4x200 m freestyle |
| Silver medal – second place | 1995 Mar del Plata | 200 m freestyle |
| Silver medal – second place | 1995 Mar del Plata | 200 m medley |
Summer Universiade
| Gold medal – first place | 1991 Sheffield | 200 m medley |
| Silver medal – second place | 1991 Sheffield | 400 m medley |

Gregory Stewart Burgess (born January 11, 1972) is an American former competition swimmer and Olympic medalist.

Burgess was born in Baltimore, Maryland. He attended the Bolles School in Jacksonville, Florida, where he swam for the Bolles high school swim team. He graduated from Bolles in 1990.

Burgess accepted an athletic scholarship to attend the University of Florida in Gainesville, Florida, where he swam for the Florida Gators swimming and diving team in National Collegiate Athletic Association (NCAA) competition from 1991 to 1994. While in college, he set four American records: two in the 200-meter individual medley and two in the 400-meter individual medley, and was a four-time NCAA champion in the same two events in 1993 and 1994. Burgess received twelve All-American honors as a Gator swimmer. He graduated from the University of Florida with a bachelor's degree in economics in 1994.

He represented the United States in the 1992 and 1996 Olympic Games. He won a silver medal for his second-place performance in the men's 200-meter individual medley at the 1992 Summer Olympics in Barcelona, Spain, finishing with a time of 2:00.97. Four years later at the 1996 Summer Olympics in Atlanta, Georgia, he finished sixth in the event final of the men's 200-meter individual medley with a time of 2:02.56.

Burgess joined the U.S. Marine Corps in 1997, and has been promoted to the rank of major. In 2010, Burgess was inducted into the Marine Corps Sports Hall of Fame. Burgess has served two tours of duty in Iraq, and as the Chief of Mission for the U.S. military team at the international military games (CISM) for swimming in 2009 (Canada) and 2010 (Germany). He is one of a select few American Olympians to volunteer for military service.

== See also ==
- List of Olympic medalists in swimming (men)
- List of United States records in swimming
- List of University of Florida alumni
- List of University of Florida Olympians
- List of World Aquatics Championships medalists in swimming (men)
