= Eduardo Piccinini =

Brazilian swimmer

Personal information
- Full name: Eduardo Beca Piccinini
- Nationality: Brazil
- Born: 30 November 1968 (age 57) Manaus, Amazonas, Brazil
- Height: 1.75 m (5 ft 9 in)
- Weight: 72 kg (159 lb)

Sport
- Sport: Swimming
- Strokes: Butterfly, Freestyle
Medal record
Men's swimming
Representing Brazil
Pan American Games
Silver medal – second place	1995 Mar del Plata	100m Butterfly
Silver medal – second place	1995 Mar del Plata	4x100m freestyle
Silver medal – second place	1995 Mar del Plata	4x100m medley
Bronze medal – third place	1991 Havana	100m Butterfly

Eduardo Beca Piccinini (born 30 November 1968) is a former international butterfly swimmer from Brazil.

He currently resides in Arizona, in United States, and his name illustrates the Amazon Swimming Cup.

He was at the 1991 Pan American Games in Havana, where he earned a bronze medal in the 100-metre butterfly.

At the 1992 Summer Olympics in Barcelona, Piccinini finished 18th in the 100-metre butterfly, and 15th in the 200-metre butterfly.

Piccinini was at the 1994 World Aquatics Championships, in Rome, where he finished 25th in the 100-metre butterfly, and 26th in the 200-metre butterfly.

At the 1995 Pan American Games in Mar del Plata, Piccinini won a silver medal in the 100-metre butterfly and in the 4×100-metre freestyle. In the 4×100-metre medley relay, Piccinini won the silver medal, beating the South American record, with a time of 3:43.93, along with Gustavo Borges, Rogério Romero and Oscar Godói.
