= Fernando Scherer =

Brazilian swimmer (born 1974)

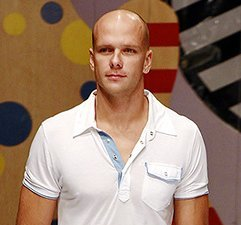
- Scherer in 2006

Personal information
- Full name: Fernando de Queiroz Scherer
- Nickname: "Xuxa"
- Nationality: Brazilian
- Born: October 6, 1974 (age 51) Florianópolis, SC, Brazil
- Height: 1.93 m (6 ft 4 in)
- Weight: 85 kg (187 lb)

Sport
- Sport: Swimming
- Strokes: Freestyle
- Club: Pinheiros/Flamengo
Medal record
Men's swimming
Representing Brazil
Olympic Games
Bronze medal – third place	1996 Atlanta	50 m freestyle
Bronze medal – third place	2000 Sydney	4×100 m freestyle
World Championships (LC)
Bronze medal – third place	1994 Rome	4×100 m freestyle
World Championships (SC)
Gold medal – first place	1993 Palma	100 m freestyle
Gold medal – first place	1993 Palma	4×100 m freestyle
Gold medal – first place	1995 Rio	100 m freestyle
Gold medal – first place	1995 Rio	4×100 m freestyle
Silver medal – second place	1995 Rio	50 m freestyle
Goodwill Games
Gold medal – first place	1998 New York	50 m freestyle
Gold medal – first place	1998 New York	4×100 m freestyle
Silver medal – second place	1998 New York	100 m freestyle
Silver medal – second place	2001 Brisbane	4×100 m freestyle
Pan American Games
Gold medal – first place	1995 Mar del Plata	50 m freestyle
Gold medal – first place	1999 Winnipeg	50 m freestyle
Gold medal – first place	1999 Winnipeg	100 m freestyle
Gold medal – first place	1999 Winnipeg	4×100 m freestyle
Gold medal – first place	1999 Winnipeg	4×100 m medley
Gold medal – first place	2003 Santo Domingo	50 m freestyle
Gold medal – first place	2003 Santo Domingo	4×100 m freestyle
Silver medal – second place	1995 Mar del Plata	4×100 m freestyle
Silver medal – second place	1995 Mar del Plata	4×200 m freestyle
Bronze medal – third place	1995 Mar del Plata	100 m freestyle
Universiade
Gold medal – first place	1995 Fukuoka	50 m freestyle
Gold medal – first place	1995 Fukuoka	100 m freestyle
Silver medal – second place	1995 Fukuoka	4×100m freestyle

Fernando de Queiroz Scherer (born October 6, 1974) is a Brazilian former international swimmer. He won the bronze medal in the 50-meter freestyle at the 1996 Summer Olympics in Atlanta and another bronze medal four years later in Sydney with the Brazilian relay team in the 4×100-meter freestyle.

Scherer won his first major title at the inaugural 1993 FINA Short Course World Championships in Palma de Mallorca, where he won the 100-meter freestyle. He trained at The Race Club, a swimming club founded by Olympic swimmers Gary Hall, Jr. and his father, Gary Hall, Sr. as a training group for elite swimmers in preparation for the 2000 Sydney Olympic Games.

Scherer is nicknamed Xuxa in his native country, and he became Brazil's Sportsman of The Year in 1995 after winning one gold and one silver medal at the 1995 FINA Short Course World Championships in Rio de Janeiro. Scherer was involved in the organization Cansei. In 2009, he took part in the second season of a reality television program called A Fazenda, where one of his fellow contestants was his future wife, the actress and dancer Sheila Mello. Scherer and Mello married on June 24, 2010, in São Paulo.

== Beginning ==
Scherer began swimming when he was a child to help improve his respiratory problems. When he was 14, he participated in his first competitions and trained at the Doze de Agosto club. In 1992, he began to achieve national prominence, winning the 50-meter freestyle and 100-meter freestyle in the Brazil Trophy. That day, his friends created a nickname "Xuxa", by which Scherer became widely known because his blond hair resembled that of a children's television presenter with the same name.

== International career ==
=== 1993 ===
At the Brazilian short course championship, the Jose Finkel Trophy in Santos on July 7, 1993, the Brazilian team comprising Fernando Scherer, Teófilo Ferreira, José Carlos Souza and Gustavo Borges, broke the world record in the 4×100-meter freestyle with a time of 3:13.97—three centiseconds better than the Swedish team record of 3:14.00 from March 19, 1989. On December 5, Brazil again broke the world record, with the same team, with a time of 3:12.11. This mark was achieved at the 1993 FINA World Swimming Championships (25 m), in Palma de Mallorca, where Scherer won his first major titles: the gold in the 100-meter freestyle and in the 4×100-meter freestyle, at 19 years of age and after five years of competitive swimming experience. With this, Scherer was elected as the revelation athlete of Brazil. He also finished eighth in the 50-meter freestyle.

=== 1994 ===
Scherer participated in the 1994 World Aquatics Championships in Rome, where he won the bronze in the 4×100-meter freestyle—along with Teófilo Ferreira, André Teixeira and Gustavo Borges. Scherer also finished 10th in the 50-meter freestyle and 14th in the 100-meter freestyle.

=== 1995 ===
In 1995, Scherer signed with Flamengo. He was the first swimmer with signed contract. In March, he competed at the 1995 Pan American Games in Argentina, where he became champion of the 50-meter freestyle, two silver medals in 4×100-meter freestyle and 4×200-meter freestyle, and bronze in the 100-meter freestyle. He was named the Brazilian Athlete of the Year in 1995, after winning two gold medals in the 100-meter freestyle and 4×100-meter freestyle at the 1995 FINA World Swimming Championships (25 m) in Rio de Janeiro. In the 4×100-meter freestyle, he opened with a time of 47.74 seconds in the heats and a time of 47.63 seconds in the final—a South American and Championship record. He also won a silver medal in the 50-meter freestyle.

=== 1996 ===
At the 1996 Summer Olympics, in Atlanta, Scherer earned a bronze medal in the 50-metre freestyle, came 5th in the 100-metre freestyle and 4th in the 4×100-metre freestyle.

=== 1997 ===
1997 was a bad year for Scherer. He could not swim competitively for six months after experiencing problems in his left shoulder and both knees caused after the Olympics. He competed in the 1997 FINA World Swimming Championships (25 m), where he finished 13th in the 100-meter freestyle, and 20th in the 50-meter freestyle.

=== 1998 ===
In 1998, Scherer moved to Coral Springs, Florida. He swam at the 1998 World Aquatics Championships, in Perth, Australia, where he finished eighth in the 50-meter freestyle, 17th in the 100-meter freestyle and sixth in the 4×100-meter freestyle. In August in New York City, at the Goodwill Games, Scherer broke the South American record for the 50-meter freestyle with a time of 22.18 seconds, that would only be broken in 2007 by César Cielo. He also broke the 100-metre freestyle record with a time of 48.69 seconds, which was unbroken until 2006, also by Cielo. With that, Scherer attained first place in the world rankings in both events; he was awarded the title of "World's Best" by Swimworld magazine, and for the second time the best Brazilian athlete, by COB. At this time, the world record for the 50-meter freestyle was 21.81 seconds, set by Tom Jager; the 100-meter freestyle world record was 48.21 seconds, set by Alexander Popov.

At the end of 1998, Scherer broke the third consecutive world record by a Brazilian relay team in the 4×100-meter freestyle on short course. On December 20, shortly after the end of Jose Finkel Trophy, the team of Scherer, Carlos Jayme, Alexandre Massura and Gustavo Borges, in order, fell the pool at Club de Regatas Vasco da Gama and recorded a time of 3:10.45; a record which would be broken in 2000 by the Swedish team.

In this competition, Scherer had also broken the short-course South American records in the 50-meter freestyle with a time of 21.44 seconds, the 100-meter freestyle with a time of 47.17 seconds, and the Brazilian record in the 100-meter butterfly with a time of 53.13 seconds. In the 50-meter freestyle, Scherer was 0.13 seconds slower than Mark Foster's world record of 21.31 seconds, obtained on December 13. He also came close to the world record in the 100-meter freestyle of 46.74 seconds set by Popov in 1994.

Scherer was also elected Best Swimmer in the World, in 1998, by FINA.

=== 1999 ===
In March 1999, Scherer broke the South American record for the 50-meter butterfly twice in one week. Also this year, Scherer participated in the 1999 Pan American Games in Winnipeg, in which Brazil achieved its best swimming results of all time. The Brazilian 4×100-meter medley relay team of Alexandre Massura, Marcelo Tomazini, Gustavo Borges and Scherer won the race for the first time in the Pan's history, with a time of 3:40.27, breaking the Pan American and South American records and securing a place in the 2000 Summer Olympics. Scherer also won the gold in the 50-meter freestyle, 100-meter freestyle, and 4×100-meter freestyle and broke the South American record for the latter race, becoming the first Brazilian to win four gold medals in the same Pan American Games.

=== 2000 ===
This year, Scherer forwent all competitions to prepare for the 2000 Summer Olympics in Sydney. However, after an accident on the stairs of his house he sprained an ankle and partially tore the ligament, almost costing him the Games. Although his injury affected his performance—he hardly used his legs—, Scherer won the bronze in the 4×100-meter freestyle and participated in two other heats, ranking 12th in the 4×100-meter medley and 20th in the 50-meter freestyle.

=== 2002 ===
In 2002, Scherer returned to Brazil and moved to São Paulo.

=== 2003 ===
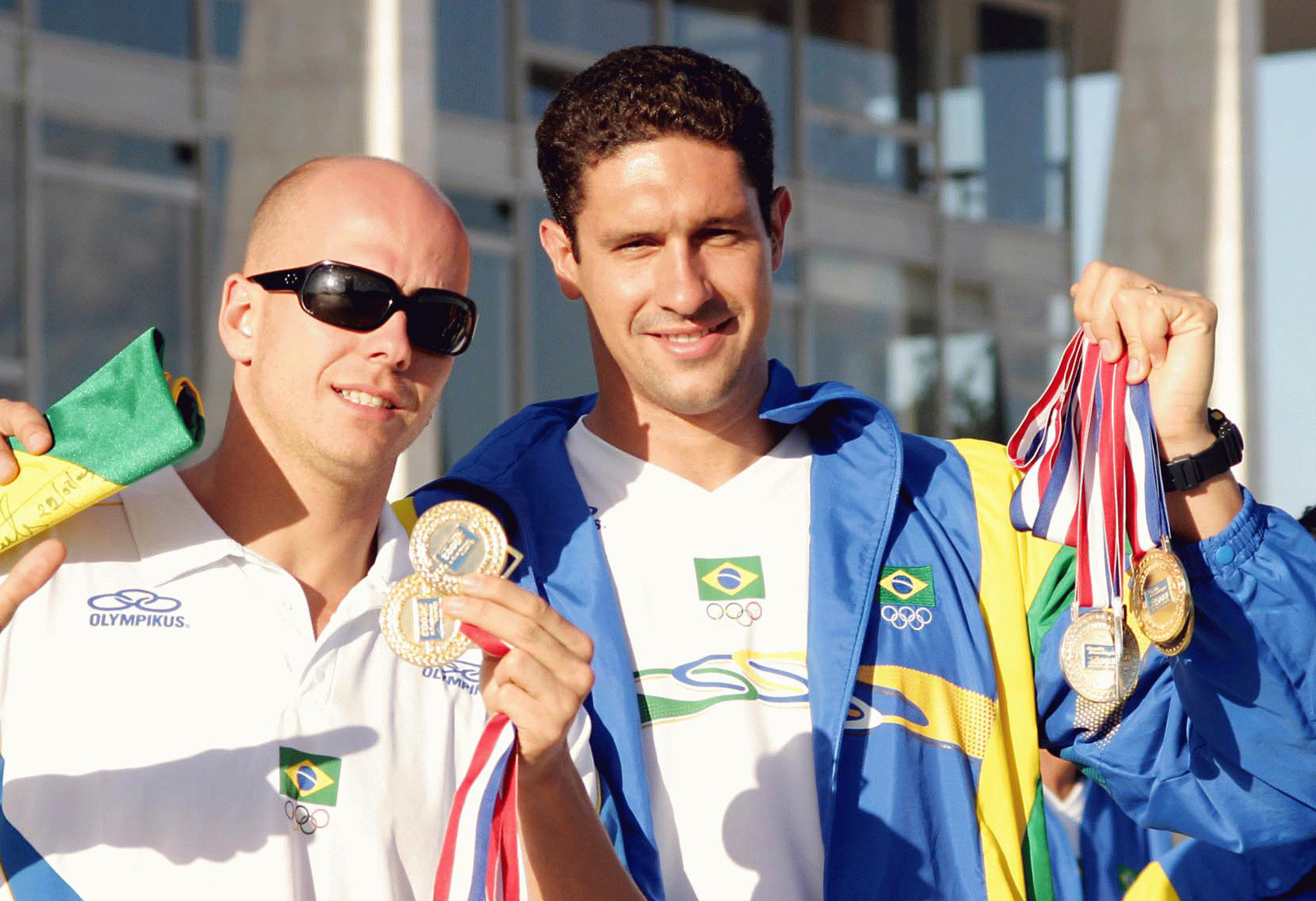
Scherer and Gustavo Borges in the 2003 Pan American Games

At the 2003 World Aquatics Championships in Barcelona, Scherer broke his own South American record in the 50-meters butterfly with a time of 23.86 seconds. He went to the final, finishing in 8th. He also finished 23rd in the 50-meter freestyle, and 12th in the 4×100-meter freestyle.

At the age of 29, Scherer competed in his third Pan American Games in Santo Domingo, where he helped Brazil win 21 medals in swimming—Brazil's all-time record. Scherer won the gold in the 50-meter freestyle, beating the Olympic champion Gary Hall Jr. and world champion José Meolans, and gold in the 4×100-meter freestyle.

=== 2004 ===
In May, Scherer equaled his South American record of 23.86 seconds in the 50-meter butterfly. At the 2004 Summer Olympics in Athens, he swam just one race, ranking 11th in the 50-meter freestyle.

=== 2005 ===
Now 30 years old, Scherer competed in the 2005 World Aquatics Championships in Montreal, where on June 24, he broke the South American record in the 50-meter butterfly in the semifinals with a time of 23.55 seconds, a record that was beaten in 2009 by César Cielo. Scherer finished fifth in the final. He also finished in 24th place in the 50-meter freestyle.

=== 2007 ===
In 2007, Scherer retired from competitive swimming.

== Records ==
Fernando Scherer is the former holder of the following records:

Race	Time	Date	Record	Pool
50m freestyle	22.18	August 1998	South American	Long Course
100m freestyle	48.69	August 2, 1998	South American	Long Course
50m butterfly	23.55	July 24, 2005	South American	Long Course
4 × 100 m freestyle	3:17.18	August 1999	South American	Long Course
4 × 100 m medley	3:40.27	August 1999	South American	Long Course
50m freestyle	21.44	December 17, 1998	South American	Short Course
100m freestyle	47.17	December 19, 1998	South American	Short Course
100m butterfly	53.13	December 19, 1998	Brazilian	Short Course
4 × 100 m freestyle	3:10.45	December 20, 1998	World	Short Course

== See also ==
- The Race Club
- South American records in swimming
