= Cassiano Leal =

Brazilian swimmer (born 1971)

Personal information
- Full name: Cassiano Schalch Leal
- Nationality: Brazil
- Born: 31 December 1971 (age 54) Piracicaba, São Paulo, Brazil
- Height: 1.87 m (6 ft 2 in)
- Weight: 82 kg (181 lb)

Sport
- Sport: Swimming
- Strokes: Freestyle
Medal record
Men's swimming
Representing Brazil
World Championships (SC)
Bronze medal – third place	1993 Palma	4×200 m free
Bronze medal – third place	1995 Rio de Janeiro	4×200 m free
Pan American Games
Silver medal – second place	1991 Havana	4×200 m free
Silver medal – second place	1995 Mar del Plata	4×200 m free

Cassiano Schalch Leal (born 31 December 1971 in Piracicaba, São Paulo) is a former international freestyle swimmer from Brazil.

At the 1991 Pan American Games, in Havana, Leal won the silver medal in the 4×200-metre freestyle.

Leal was at the 1993 FINA World Swimming Championships (25 m), in Palma de Mallorca, where he won the bronze medal in the 4×200-metre freestyle, along with José Carlos Souza, Teófilo Ferreira and Gustavo Borges (breaking the South American record with a time of 7:09.38). He also finished 14th (6th in the B final) in the 400-metre freestyle, with a time of 3:52.47.

At the 1995 Pan American Games, in Mar del Plata, Leal won for the second time the silver medal in the 4×200-metre freestyle. He also finished 4th in the 200-metre freestyle, and 6th in the 400-metre freestyle.

Participating at the 1995 FINA World Swimming Championships (25 m), in Rio de Janeiro, Leal won again the bronze medal in the 4×200-metre freestyle, now along with Fernando Saez, Teófilo Ferreira and Gustavo Borges.

He participated at the 1996 Summer Olympics, in Atlanta, for his native country. His best and only result in Atlanta, Georgia was the 10th place in the Men's 4×200-metre freestyle.

Leal participated at the 1999 Pan American Games, in Winnipeg, where he finished 10th in the 400-metre freestyle.
