= Emanuel Nascimento =

Brazilian swimmer (born 1970)

Personal information
- Full name: Emanuel Fortes Nascimento
- Born: 13 August 1970 (age 55) Minas Gerais, Brazil
- Height: 1.82 m (6 ft 0 in)
- Weight: 71 kg (157 lb)

Sport
- Sport: Swimming
- Strokes: Freestyle, Butterfly
Medal record
Men's swimming
Representing Brazil
Pan American Games
Gold medal – first place	1991 Havana	4x100m Freestyle
Silver medal – second place	1991 Havana	4x200m Freestyle

Emanuel Fortes Nascimento (born 13 August 1970 in Minas Gerais) is a former international freestyle swimmer from Brazil, who participated in two consecutive Summer Olympics for his native country, starting in 1988. His best result was the 6th place in the Men's 4×100-metre freestyle in 1992.

At the 1988 Summer Olympics, in Seoul, he finished 10th in the 4×200-metre freestyle, 12th in the 4×100-metre freestyle, 18th in the 4×100-metre medley, 36th in the 200-metre butterfly, and 37th in the 100-metre freestyle.

He was the South American record holder of the 100-metre freestyle, between 1990 and 1991.

At the 1991 World Aquatics Championships, Nascimento finished 24th in the 100-metre freestyle, and 26th in the 200-metre freestyle.

He was at the 1991 Pan American Games, in Havana. He won gold in the 4×100-metre freestyle, and silver in the 4×200-metre freestyle. He also finished 6th in the 100-metre freestyle, and 7th in the 100-metre butterfly.

At the 1992 Summer Olympics, in Barcelona, he finished 6th in the 4×100-metre freestyle, 7th in the 4×200-metre freestyle, and 25th in the 100-metre freestyle.

After closing the swimming career, he became commercial director of Monytel, a company that operates in the field of communications.
