= José Carlos Souza =

Brazilian swimmer (born 1971)

Personal information
- Full name: José Carlos Souza Júnior
- National team: Brazil
- Born: July 13, 1971 (age 54) São Paulo, Brazil
- Height: 6 ft 2 in (1.88 m)

Sport
- Sport: Swimming
- Strokes: Butterfly, freestyle, medley
- Club: Esporte Clube Pinheiros, UT, Bolles Sharks
- College team: University of Tennessee
Medal record
Men's swimming
Representing Brazil
World Championships (SC)
Gold medal – first place	1993 Palma	4×100 m freestyle
Bronze medal – third place	1993 Palma	4×200 m freestyle

José Carlos Souza Júnior (born July 13, 1971) is a former international swimmer from Brazil, who participated at the 1992 Summer Olympics for his native country. In 1987, he went to live in the United States. He studied Business Administration at the University of Tennessee.

At the 1991 World Aquatics Championships, he finished 25th in the 100-metre butterfly, and 30th in the 200-metre individual medley.

José Carlos was at the 1991 Pan American Games in Havana, where he finished 7th in the 200-metre individual medley, and 8th in the 50-metre freestyle.

At the 1992 Summer Olympics in Barcelona, his best result was the sixth place in the men's 4×100-metre freestyle. He also finished 12th in the 100-metre butterfly, and 30th in the 200-metre individual medley.

In 1993 he broke two World Records on short course. On July 7, the Brazil team, composed of Fernando Scherer, Teofilo Ferreira, José Carlos Souza and Gustavo Borges broke the world record in 4×100-metre freestyle with a time of 3:13.97, which belonged to Sweden since March 19, 1989: 3:14.00. On December 5, Brazil again beat the record, with the same team, doing 3:12.11. This mark was achieved in the 1993 FINA World Swimming Championships, where he won gold in the 4×100-metre freestyle, and bronze in the 4×200-metre freestyle (breaking the South American record with a time of 7:09.38). He also finished 5th in the 4×100-metre medley, along with Maurício Menezes, Gustavo Borges and Rogério Romero, and 15th in the 100-metre butterfly.

In 1993, he was the South American record holder in the 50-metre and 100-metre butterfly, and in the 200-metre individual medley.

He won the Bronze medal in the 1992 NCAA Championships-1993 Indianapolis, in the 100-metre butterfly. Won the gold medal in the 1992 SEC Championships-1992 Fayetville, in the 100-metre butterfly. Brasil National Champion multiple times in 50-metre freestyle, 100-metre freestyle, 100-metre butterfly, 200-metre butterfly, 200-metre individual medley.
