= Josh Davis (swimmer) =

American swimmer (born 1972)

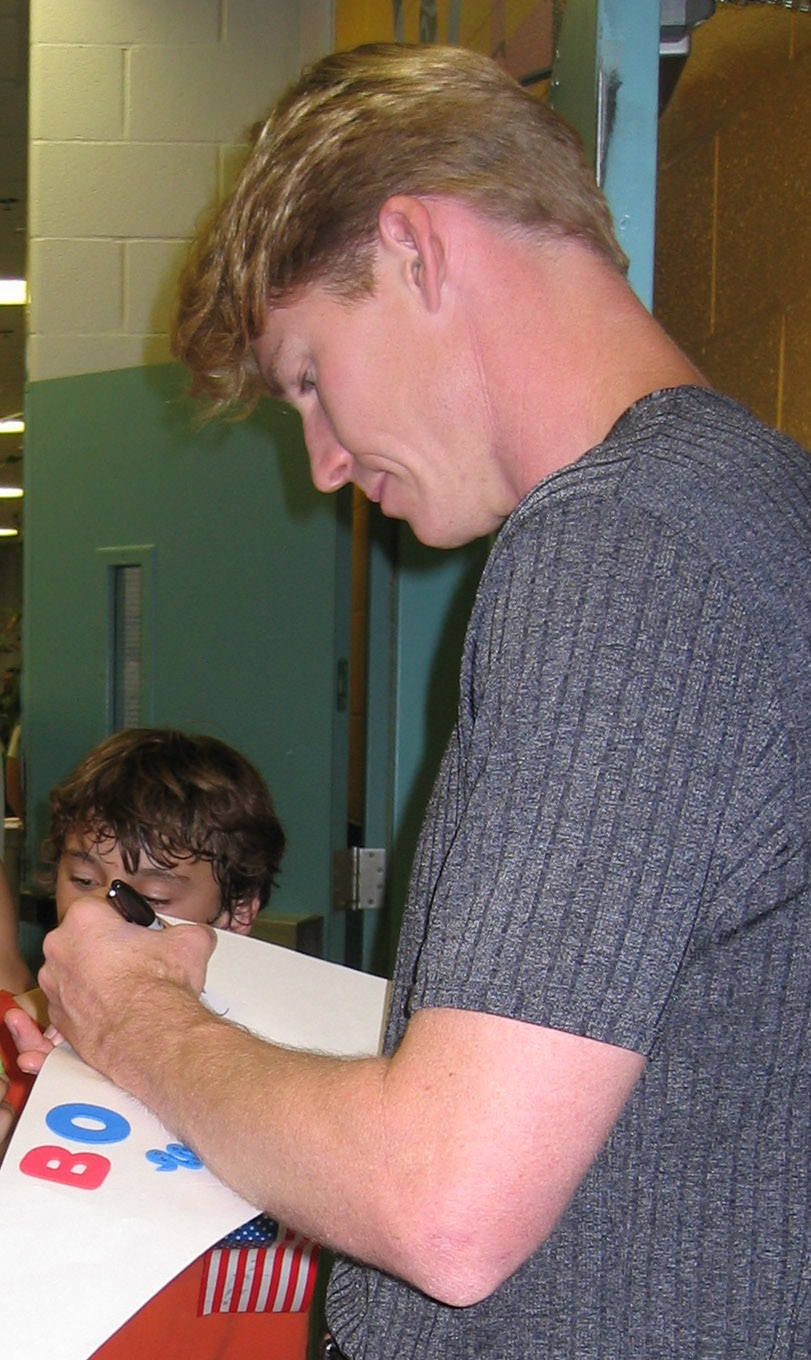
- Davis signing autographs, c. 2005

Personal information
- Full name: Joshua Clark Davis
- National team: United States
- Born: September 1, 1972 (age 53) San Antonio, Texas, U.S.
- Occupation: Collegiate swim coach
- Height: 6 ft 2 in (1.88 m)
- Weight: 185 lb (84 kg)
- Spouse: Shantel
- Children: 6

Sport
- Sport: Swimming
- Event: Freestyle Relay
- Strokes: Freestyle
- Club: Alamo Area Aquatics Club
- College team: University of Texas
- Coach: Eddie Reese, Kris Kubik (U. of Texas)
Medal record
Men's swimming
Representing United States
Olympic Games
| Gold medal – first place | 1996 Atlanta | 4×100 m freestyle |
| Gold medal – first place | 1996 Atlanta | 4×200 m freestyle |
| Gold medal – first place | 1996 Atlanta | 4×100 m medley |
| Silver medal – second place | 2000 Sydney | 4×100 m freestyle |
| Silver medal – second place | 2000 Sydney | 4×200 m freestyle |
World Championships (LC)
| Gold medal – first place | 1994 Rome | 4×100 m freestyle |
World Championships (SC)
| Gold medal – first place | 2000 Athens | 4×200 m freestyle |
| Silver medal – second place | 2000 Athens | 4×100 m freestyle |
Pan Pacific Championships
| Gold medal – first place | 1993 Kobe | 200 m freestyle |
| Gold medal – first place | 1993 Kobe | 4×200 m freestyle |
| Gold medal – first place | 1997 Fukuoka | 4×200 m freestyle |
| Silver medal – second place | 1997 Fukuoka | 200 m freestyle |
| Silver medal – second place | 1999 Sydney | 4×100 m freestyle |
| Silver medal – second place | 1999 Sydney | 4×200m freestyle |
Pan American Games
| Gold medal – first place | 1995 Mar del Plata | 400 m freestyle |
| Gold medal – first place | 1995 Mar del Plata | 4×100 m freestyle |
| Gold medal – first place | 1995 Mar del Plata | 4×200 m freestyle |
| Bronze medal – third place | 1995 Mar del Plata | 200 m freestyle |
Summer Universiade
| Gold medal – first place | 1991 Sheffield | 4×100 m freestyle |
| Gold medal – first place | 1995 Fukuoka | 400 m freestyle |
| Gold medal – first place | 1995 Fukuoka | 4×100 m freestyle |
| Gold medal – first place | 1995 Fukuoka | 4×200 m freestyle |
| Gold medal – first place | 1995 Fukuoka | 4×100 m medley |
| Silver medal – second place | 1991 Sheffield | 4×200 m freestyle |
| Bronze medal – third place | 1995 Fukuoka | 100 m freestyle |

Joshua Clark Davis (born September 1, 1972) is an American former competition swimmer who competed for the University of Texas, a three-time Olympic gold medalist, and a former world record-holder. He represented the United States at the 1996 Atlanta Summer Olympics where he won three gold medals and at the 2000 Sydney Summer Olympics where he won two silver.

== Early swimming ==
Davis was born September 1, 1972 in San Antonio, Texas. He did not begin competing in swimming meets until he was 12. While attending San Antonio's Winston Churchill High School, where he was trained and managed by Al Marks, Davis helped lead the Churchill Chargers to four successive Texas State team titles. He won individual championships in state competition in the 200-yard freestyle in 1988, 1989, and 1990. In age group club swimming, Davis competed and trained with the Alamo Area Aquatics Club, where he was a Texas Age Group Swimming (TAGS) champion in multiple meets. He swam as part of the 1989 4×100-yard freestyle relay team that established a new national public high school record, that held for over two decades.

== University of Texas ==
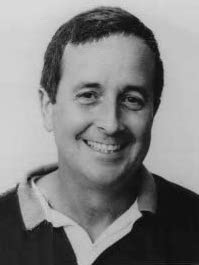
Reese 1988

He attended the University of Texas at Austin, where he swam for coach Eddie Reese and Associate Coach Kris Kubik's Texas Longhorns swimming and diving team in National Collegiate Athletic Association (NCAA) competition. While at the University of Texas, he captured 23 All-American awards, and helped lead Texas to the 1991 NCAA team championship. Davis won the 1993 NCAA individual 200-yard freestyle title and was a member of the American record setting and 1994 NCAA championship 400-yard freestyle relay.

== Olympics 1996-2000 ==
=== 1996 Atlanta ===
Somewhat disappointed at the outcome of the 1996 Olympic trials, he finished third in the finals of the 100-meter freestyle, and fourth in the 400-meter freestyle, and did not qualify in the two events. He was relieved to qualify in his specialty the 200-meter freestyle, where he had been ranked No. 1 in the world in 1995.

At the 1996 Summer Olympics in Atlanta, Georgia, he won gold medals by swimming for the winning U.S. teams in the 4×100-meter freestyle relay and 4×200-meter freestyle relay. He earned a third gold medal by swimming for the first-place U.S. team in the preliminary heats of the 4×100-meter medley relay. He also competed in the 200-meter freestyle, and finished seventh in the event final with a time of 1:48.54. At the 1996 Olympics Davis was the only male athlete in any sport to win three gold medals.

=== 2000 Sydney ===
Four years later at the 2000 Olympic trials, Davis broke Mat Biondi's 1988 record in the 200-meter freestyle.

At the 2000 Summer Olympics in Sydney, Australia, he served as the captain of the U.S. swimming team. At the 2000 Olympics, he won silver medals swimming for the second-place U.S. teams in the preliminary heats of the 4×100-meter freestyle relay, and the final of the 4×200-meter freestyle relay. He again competed in the 200-meter freestyle, finishing in fourth place in the final with a time of 1:46.73.

=== International career ===
Exceptionally accomplished in international competition, he swam for the U.S. national team at:

- World Championships: 1994, 1998
- Pan American Games: 1995
- Pan Pacific Championships: 1993, 1997, 1999
- World University Games: 1995
- Short Course Worlds: 2000

=== Honors ===
Davis is a member of the San Antonio Sports Hall of Fame, the University of Texas Hall of Honor, and the Texas Swimming and Diving Hall of Fame (2011). Completed in 2001, the San Antonio area's Josh Davis Natatorium was named in his honor. The natatorium is one of two in the North East ISD's Virgil T. Blossom Athletic Center in Davis's former school district.

== Life outside competitive swimming ==
In February 2009 four of Davis' Olympic medals—three gold medals and one silver medal—were stolen from his car after he returned from a swim clinic in St. Louis. On February 13, 2009, cleanup crews found the medals outside one of the Salvation Army's Boys and Girls Clubs in San Antonio. The medals were returned to Davis at a news conference later that night.

Davis has worked as a motivational speaker and television sports commentator. On June 1, 2016, he was named as the first coach of Oklahoma Christian University's swimming programs, charged with building men's and women's teams for competition that began with the 2017-18 season. It was Davis' first collegiate coaching job.

Davis and his wife Shantel have six children and one grandchild.

== See also ==
- Bill Boomer, swimming coach
- List of multiple Olympic gold medalists
- List of multiple Olympic gold medalists at a single Games
- List of Olympic medalists in swimming (men)
- List of University of Texas at Austin alumni
- List of World Aquatics Championships medalists in swimming (men)
- World record progression 4 × 200 metres freestyle relay
