= Gustavo Borges =

Brazilian swimmer (born 1972)

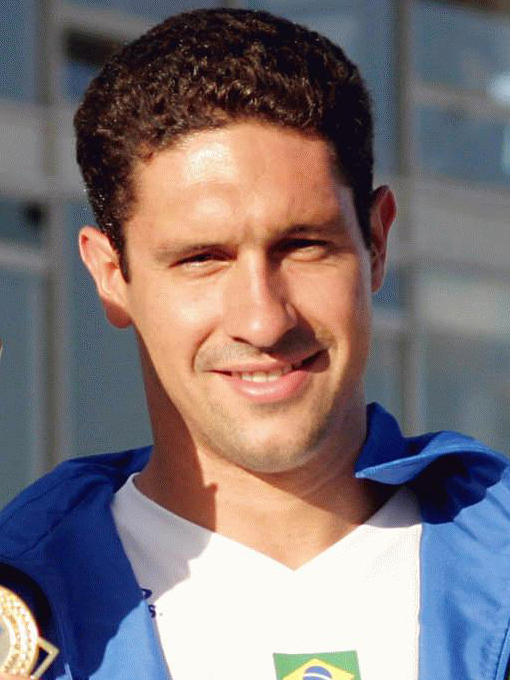
- Gustavo Borges in 2003

Personal information
- Full name: Gustavo França Borges
- National team: Brazil
- Born: 2 December 1972 (age 53) Ribeirão Preto, São Paulo
- Height: 2.03 m (6 ft 8 in)
- Weight: 98 kg (216 lb)

Sport
- Sport: Swimming
- Strokes: Freestyle
- Club: Pinheiros, Vasco da Gama
- College team: University of Michigan
- Coach: Jon Urbanchek (Michigan)
Medal record
Men's swimming
Representing Brazil
Event	1st	2nd	3rd
Olympic Games	0	2	2
World Championships (LC)	0	0	2
World Championships (SC)	4	4	2
Pan American Games	8	6	3
Universiade	0	2	0
Total	12	14	9
Olympic Games
Silver medal – second place	1992 Barcelona	100 m freestyle
Silver medal – second place	1996 Atlanta	200 m freestyle
Bronze medal – third place	1996 Atlanta	100 m freestyle
Bronze medal – third place	2000 Sydney	4×100 m freestyle
World Championships (LC)
Bronze medal – third place	1994 Rome	100 m freestyle
Bronze medal – third place	1994 Rome	4×100 m freestyle
World Championships (SC)
Gold medal – first place	1993 Palma	4×100 m freestyle
Gold medal – first place	1995 Rio	200 m freestyle
Gold medal – first place	1995 Rio	4×100 m freestyle
Gold medal – first place	1997 Gothenburg	200 m freestyle
Silver medal – second place	1993 Palma	100 m freestyle
Silver medal – second place	1995 Rio	100 m freestyle
Silver medal – second place	1997 Gothenburg	100 m freestyle
Silver medal – second place	2002 Moscow	200 m freestyle
Bronze medal – third place	1993 Palma	4×200 m freestyle
Bronze medal – third place	1995 Rio	4×200 m freestyle
Pan American Games
Gold medal – first place	1991 Havana	100 m freestyle
Gold medal – first place	1991 Havana	4×100 m freestyle
Gold medal – first place	1995 Mar del Plata	100 m freestyle
Gold medal – first place	1995 Mar del Plata	200 m freestyle
Gold medal – first place	1999 Winnipeg	200 m freestyle
Gold medal – first place	1999 Winnipeg	4×100 m freestyle
Gold medal – first place	1999 Winnipeg	4×100 m medley
Gold medal – first place	2003 Santo Domingo	4×100 m freestyle
Silver medal – second place	1991 Havana	200 m freestyle
Silver medal – second place	1991 Havana	4×200 m freestyle
Silver medal – second place	1995 Mar del Plata	4×100 m freestyle
Silver medal – second place	1995 Mar del Plata	4×200 m freestyle
Silver medal – second place	1995 Mar del Plata	4×100 m Medley
Silver medal – second place	1999 Winnipeg	4×200 m freestyle
Silver medal – second place	2003 Santo Domingo	4×200 m freestyle
Bronze medal – third place	1991 Havana	50 m freestyle
Bronze medal – third place	1999 Winnipeg	100 m freestyle
Bronze medal – third place	2003 Santo Domingo	100 m freestyle
Summer Universiade
Silver medal – second place	1995 Fukuoka	100 m freestyle
Silver medal – second place	1995 Fukuoka	4×100 m freestyle

Gustavo França Borges (born 2 December 1972) is a Brazilian former competitive swimmer. He swam for Brazil in four Summer Olympic Games: 1992, 1996, 2000 and 2004. With four medals in swimming, as of 2000 Borges had won the fourth-most Olympic medals of any Brazilian athlete, with one in 1992, two in 1996 and one in 2000. Sailors Robert Scheidt and Torben Grael and canoeist Isaquias Queiroz have won five, and gymnast Rebeca Andrade won six. As of 2000, he had won eight Pan American Games gold medals, the third-most of any Brazilian competitor. Borges was Brazil's flagbearer for the Closing Ceremony at the 2004 Summer Olympics.

Borges lives in São Paulo, where he runs his own swimming school. He had formerly resided in the United States, first in Jacksonville, Florida and then in Ann Arbor, Michigan while he was a student at Michigan. He attended the University of Michigan in the mid-1990s, where he competed and trained for the university's swim team, managed by Hall of Fame Coach Jon Urbanchek and graduated with a degree in Economics. His teammates at Michigan included Eric Namesnik and Marcel Wouda in the mid-1990s.

== Early life and swimming ==
Borges was born in Ribeirão Preto, Brazil, but lived in Ituverava throughout his childhood. In 1981, at the age of nine, he represented his school, placing third in the 50-meter freestyle, his first podium finish. Earlier, he had participated in swimming lessons at Associação Atlética Ituveravense. In 1984, in São João da Boa Vista, Gustavo won his first medal in official competition in the 100-meter breaststroke. Borges was a runner-up at the São Paulo state championship, and a runner-up at the Teto Olímpico in breaststroke, for the 11-12 age group category.

At the age of 15 in 1987, he trained and competed for the Associação Atlética Francana. Borges won the bronze in the 100-meter freestyle and silver in the 50-meter freestyle at the São Paulo Swimming Championship, in the A/B Youth category. That year, Borges left Ituverava, moved to São Carlos and defended his titles at the São Carlos Clube. At the São Paulo's Summer Youth Championship in 1988, he won gold in the 50-meter and silver in the 100-meter freestyle events. Borges' times qualified him to compete in the Brazilian Championship, for the Júlio Delamare Trophy.

In 1991, Borges joined The Bolles School in Jacksonville and quickly distinguished himself as one of America's foremost high school swimmers. He was the primary swimmer on Bolles' 1991 4x100 Freestyle Relay team that set a national high-school record with a recorded time of 2:59.98. That relay, which broke the old national record by 1.70 seconds, would later be disputed for claiming to be an official national record. This was due to the fact that the Florida high-school season officially is held in the fall, but the meet in which the record was set occurred at a Philadelphia prep school invitational in February 1991. His Bolles' 4x100 national high school relay record held until 2012.

== International career ==
=== 1989: National prominence ===
In 1989, after joining the Esporte Clube Pinheiros, Borges began to gain national fame. At 17, he began placing ahead of the adult Brazilian swimmer Cristiano Michelena, who had formerly dominated the 100-meter and 200-meter events in Brazilian national competition. Borges won the Brazil Trophy, awarded at the best known and best attended tournament in Brazil, capturing two gold medals in the 50-meter and 100-meter freestyle.

=== 1990 Brazilian championships ===
In 1990, Borges began gaining recognition from victories in international competition. In the South American championship held in Rosario, Argentina, he won gold in three high profile freestyle events; the 50-meter freestyle, and both the 4×100 and 4×200-meter freestyle relays. In July, at the Jose Finkel Trophy—the Brazilian short course championship—he became the first Brazilian to complete the 100-meter freestyle under 49 seconds with a time of 48.59 seconds, and was summoned to swim in the 1991 World Aquatics Championships in Perth, Australia. The same year, Borges went to the United States to study at The Bolles School in Jacksonville, Florida.

=== 1991 Pan American Games ===
At the 1991 World Aquatics Championships, Borges finished in 12th in the 100-meter freestyle, breaking the South American record with a time of 50.77 seconds, and also in the 50-meter freestyle (23.15 seconds). He also finished 28th in the 200-meter freestyle. Borges won his first important international medals in the 1991 Pan American Games in Havana. He won the 100-meter freestyle setting a Pan Am Games record, and was a silver medalist in the 200-meter freestyle. He won a bronze at the 1991 Pan Am Games in the 50-meter freestyle, breaking the South American record. In relay events at the 1991 Pan Ams, he won gold in the 4×100-meter freestyle, and silver in the 4×200-meter freestyle.

== 1992 Barcelona Olympics ==
Participating in his first Olympics the 1992 Summer Olympics in Barcelona, Borges won the silver medal in the 100-meter freestyle with a time of 49.43 seconds, a South American record, losing the gold to Alexander Popov. There was a delay after the end of the event as a result of a malfunction in Borges lane timer, requiring an official judge's review of video recordings to verify Borge's second place finish. Borges even overcame his idol, Matt Biondi, to win the silver medal. In other Barcelona Olympic events, Borges placed sixth overall in the 4×100-meter freestyle, seventh in the 4×200-meter freestyle, 13th in the 50-meter freestyle and 22nd in the 200-meter freestyle.

=== 1993: Champion, and World Record holder ===
In 1993, Borges broke three world records on the short course. The first was on 2 July, at the Jose Finkel Trophy in Santos, Brazil. Borges's time was 47.94 seconds in the 100-metre freestyle, setting a record that lasted until 1 January 1994, when it broken by Alexander Popov. On 7 July, the Brazilian team comprising Fernando Scherer, Teófilo Ferreira, José Carlos Souza and Gustavo Borges broke the world record in the 4×100-meter freestyle with a time of 3:13.97; the previous record time of 3:14.00.had been set by Sweden on 19 March 1989. On 5 December, Brazil again beat the world record with the same team, with a time of 3:12.11. This mark was achieved in 1993 FINA World Swimming Championships (25 m), which Borges won. He also won gold in the 4×100-meter freestyle, silver in the 100-meter freestyle and bronze in 4×200-meter freestyle—breaking the South American record with a time of 7:09.38. He also finished fifth in the 4×100-meter medley, along with Maurício Menezes, José Carlos Souza and Rogério Romero, and fifth in the 200-meter freestyle.

=== 1994 Rome World Aquatic Championships ===
At the September 1994 World Aquatics Championships in Rome, Borges won bronze in the 100-meter freestyle and in the 4×100-meter freestyle relay. He also finished fourth in the 50-meter freestyle and 11th in the 200-meter freestyle.

=== 1995: Two-times World and Pan Am champion ===
1995 was an important year for Borges. In March at the 1995 Pan American Games held in Argentina, he became two-time champion of the 100-meter freestyle and won gold in the 200-meter freestyle, both with Pan Am Games records. He won two more silver medals in the 4×100-meter and 4×200-meter freestyle events. In August, he went to the 1995 Summer Universiade, where he won two silver medals in the 100-meter freestyle and 4×100-meter freestyle. At the end of the year, at the 1995 FINA World Swimming Championships (25 m) in Rio de Janeiro, Borges became two-time 4×100-meter freestyle champion. He also won the 200-meter freestyle gold, breaking the South American record, with a time of 1:45.55, silver in the 100-meter freestyle and bronze in the 4×200-meter freestyle.

== 1996 Atlanta Olympics ==
Borges participated in the 1996 Summer Olympics in Atlanta, becoming the first Brazilian to win three Olympic medals, a feat achieved by Torben Grael in the same games. Borges won the silver medal in the 200-meter freestyle with a time of 1:48.08, and bronze in the 100-meter freestyle with a time of 49.02 seconds, both South American records. The 100-meter freestyle record was only beaten by Fernando Scherer in August 1998, and the 200-metre freestyle was only beaten by Rodrigo Castro in 2008. Borges also finished fourth in the 4×100-meter freestyle and 12th in the 50-meter freestyle.

=== 1997: 4th World Championship gold ===
At the 1997 FINA World Swimming Championships (25 m), Borges won gold in the 200-meter freestyle and silver in the 100-meter freestyle. He also finished sixth in the 50-meter freestyle.

=== 1998: The fourth World Record ===
At the 1998 World Aquatics Championships in Perth, Australia, Borges finished fifth in the 100-meter freestyle, eighth in the 200-meter freestyle and sixth in the 4×100-meter freestyle. At the end of 1998, Borges was part of the Brazilian team which broke its third consecutive world record in the 4×100-metre freestyle relay on short course. On 20 December, shortly after the end of the Jose Finkel Trophy, Fernando Scherer, Carlos Jayme, Alexandre Massura and Gustavo Borges, in order, fell the pool at Club de Regatas Vasco da Gama with a time of 3:10.45, which would only be broken in 2000 by the Swedish team. At the same tournament, Borges also broke the South American record in the 100-meter freestyle in short course with a time of 47.14 seconds and the 200-meter freestyle record with a time of 1:44.40—the last record-breaking swims of his career.

=== 1999: Best Pan Am Games for Brazil ===
In the 1999 Pan American Games in Winnipeg, Borges led Brazil to its best Pan American Games swimming result of all time. In the 4×100-meter medley, a team comprising Borges, Alexandre Massura, Fernando Scherer and Marcelo Tomazini won the medley relay for the first time in the Pan's history with a time of 3:40.27, breaking the Pan American Games and South American records and securing a place in the 2000 Summer Olympics. He also won the gold in the 200-meter freestyle and 4×100-meter freestyle—breaking the South American record—silver in the 4×200-meter freestyle—also breaking the South American record—bronze in the 100-meter freestyle, and finished fourth in the 50-meter freestyle. In this tournament, he joined Hugo Hoyama and Claudio Kano as Brazilians who won the most gold medals in the event's history, with seven each. Borges also broke the national record for medals at the Games, with 15l. This year, Borges' first son, Luiz Gustavo, was born.

== 2000 Sydney Olympics ==
The 2000 Summer Olympics in Sydney saw Borges' last Olympic podium finish, when along with Edvaldo Valério, Carlos Jayme and Fernando Scherer, he won the bronze in the 4×100-meter freestyle with a time of 3:17.40. Australia broke the world record and took the gold with a time of 3:13.67. Borges also participated in the 100-meter freestyle, finishing in 16th position. During the Games, Gustavo was chosen by FINA to be part of a team of 12 athletes who would form a committee from 2000 to 2005. He was the only South American representative on the list. Brazil became one of the countries with a large representation within the Federation. Also in 2000, Borges started preparing to end his career and become an entrepreneur.

=== 2002: Borges final world medal ===
At the 2002 FINA World Swimming Championships (25 m) in Moscow, Borges won a silver in the 200-meter freestyle; it was his last FINA world medal. He also finished fourth in the 4×200-meter freestyle, with a time of 0.4s, which won him the bronze medal. Borges was in fifth place in the 4×100-meter freestyle, seventh place in the 100-metre freestyle and seventh place in the 4×100-metre medley In this tournament, Borges broke—for the last time in his career—the South American record in short course in the 4×200-meter freestyle, with a time of 7:09.14, and in the 4×100-meter medley with 3:35.59.

=== 2003: Last Pan ===
In July, at the 2003 World Aquatics Championships in Barcelona, Borges was in the 4×100-meter freestyle team, which finished in 12th place' He was also in teams for the 4×200-meter freestyle—which finished ninth and the 4×100-meter medley—which finished 17th.

In August 2003 at the age of 30, Borges took part in the 2003 Pan American Games—his fourth and final Pan American Games—which were held in Santo Domingo. He established himself as the greatest Brazilian medalist in the history of the tournament, having won 19 podium finishes, eight gold medals, eight silver and three bronze. In these Games, Borges helped Brazil's swimming team to win 21 medals—a record. Borges won gold in the 4×100-meter freestyle, silver in 4×200-meter freestyle, and bronze in the 100-meter freestyle.

Also in 2003, Borges launches a book titled "Lessons from the water". He also became an entrepreneur, managing the Gustavo Borges Natação e Fitness in Curitiba.

=== 2004: Retirement from professional swimming ===
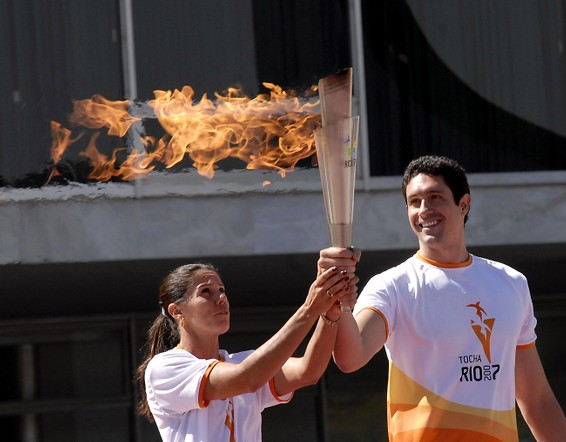
Gustavo Borges carrying the 2007 Pan American Games's torch

At the age of 31, Borges retired from swimming after competing in the 2004 Summer Olympics in Athens. His only event was the qualifying for the 4×100-meter freestyle, in which Brazil finished in 12th place and did not reach the finals. Having previously missed four opening ceremonies due to swimming contests the next day, and never witnessing any Brazilian medal other than Scherer in 1996, Borges decided to watch the rest of the Olympics, and was Brazil's flag bearer at the closing ceremony.

== Hall of Fame ==
In 2012, Borges joined the International Swimming Hall of Fame, becoming the second Brazilian to be honored by the institution – the first was Maria Lenk in 1988.

== Records ==
Gustavo Borges is the former holder of the following records:

Race	Time	Date	Record	Pool
50m freestyle	22.82	August 1991	South American	Long Course
100m freestyle	49.02	22 July 1996	South American	Long Course
200m freestyle	1:48.08	20 July 1996	South American	Long Course
4 × 100 m freestyle	3:17.18	August 1999	South American	Long Course
4 × 200 m freestyle	7:22.92	August 1999	South American	Long Course
4 × 100 m medley	3:40.27	August 1999	South American	Long Course
50m freestyle	21.90	27 June 1997	Brazilian	Short Course
100m freestyle	47.14	19 December 1998	South American	Short Course
200m freestyle	1:44.40	18 December 1998	South American	Short Course
4 × 100 m freestyle	3:10.45	20 December 1998	World	Short Course
4 × 200 m freestyle	7:09.14	4 April 2002	South American	Short Course
4 × 100 m medley	3:35.59	7 April 2002	South American	Short Course

== See also ==
- List of Olympic medalists in swimming (men)
- List of University of Michigan alumni
- Pan American Games records in swimming
- South American records in swimming
- World record progression 100 metres freestyle

Records
Preceded by Michael Gross	World Record Holder; Men's 100m Freestyle (25m); 2 July 1993 – January 1994	Succeeded by Alexander Popov
