= Teófilo Ferreira =

Brazilian swimmer (born 1973)

Personal information
- Full name: Teófilo Laborne Ferreira
- Born: 2 June 1973 (age 53) Belo Horizonte, Minas Gerais, Brazil
- Height: 1.96 m (6 ft 5 in)
- Weight: 91 kg (201 lb)

Sport
- Sport: Swimming
- Strokes: Freestyle
Medal record
World Championships (LC)
Bronze medal – third place	1994 Rome	4×100 m free
World Championships (SC)
Gold medal – first place	1993 Palma	4×100 m free
Bronze medal – third place	1993 Palma	4×200 m free
Bronze medal – third place	1995 Rio de Janeiro	4×200 m free
Pan American Games
Gold medal – first place	1991 Havana	4×100 m free
Silver medal – second place	1991 Havana	4×200 m free
Silver medal – second place	1995 Mar del Plata	4×200 m free

Teófilo Laborne Ferreira (born 2 June 1973 in Belo Horizonte) is a former international freestyle swimmer from Brazil. He participated at the 1992 Summer Olympics for his native country. His best result was the 7th place in the men's 4×200-metre freestyle. Ferreira also won three medals at the Pan American Games and four medals at the World Championships.

Teófilo was at the 1991 Pan American Games in Havana, where he won a gold medal in the 4×100-metre freestyle, and a silver in the 4×200-metre freestyle.

At the 1992 Summer Olympics in Barcelona, he went to the 4×200-metre freestyle final, finishing 7th. Also participated in the 50-metre freestyle, where Ferreira not reached the final.

The Brazilian broke in 1993 two World Records on short course. On 7 July, the Brazil team, composed of Fernando Scherer, Teofilo Ferreira, José Carlos Souza and Gustavo Borges broke the world record in 4×100-metre freestyle with a time of 3:13.97, which belonged to Sweden since 19 March 1989: 3:14.00. On 5 December, Brazil again beat the record, with the same team, doing 3:12.11. This mark was achieved in 1993 FINA World Swimming Championships, where he won gold in the 4×100-metre freestyle, and bronze in the 4×200-metre freestyle (breaking the South American record with a time of 7:09.38). He also finished 14th in the 200-metre freestyle.

At the 1994 World Aquatics Championships, held in September in Rome, Italy, the Brazilian got the bronze in the 4×100-metre freestyle relay. Ferreira also finished 27th in the 200-metre freestyle.

Teófilo was in 1995 Pan American Games in Mar del Plata, where he won a silver medal in the 4×200-metre freestyle.

At the 1995 FINA World Swimming Championships (25 m) done in Rio de Janeiro, he won bronze in the 4×200-metre freestyle.
