= Brazil at the 1999 Pan American Games =

- IOC code: BRA
- NOC: Brazilian Olympic Committee
- Website: www.cob.org.br

in Winnipeg 23 July – 8 August 1999
- Flag bearer: Robert Scheidt
- Medals Ranked 4th: Gold 25 Silver 32 Bronze 44 Total 101

Pan American Games appearances (overview)
- 1951; 1955; 1959; 1963; 1967; 1971; 1975; 1979; 1983; 1987; 1991; 1995; 1999; 2003; 2007; 2011; 2015; 2019; 2023

Brazil competed at the 13th Pan American Games that were held in Winnipeg, Manitoba, Canada from July 23 to August 8, 1999.

== Medalists ==
The following competitors from Brazil won medals at the games. In the by discipline sections below, medalists' names are bolded.

Medal	Name	Sport	Event	Date
1st place, gold medalist(s)	Maurren Maggi	Athletics	Women's long jump	24 July
1st place, gold medalist(s)	Vanderlei de Lima	Athletics	Men's marathon	25 July
1st place, gold medalist(s)	Lucélia Ribeiro	Karate	Women's +60 kg	26 July
1st place, gold medalist(s)	Elenilson da Silva	Athletics	Men's 10,000 metres	27 July
1st place, gold medalist(s)	Claudinei Silva	Athletics	Men's 200 metres	28 July
1st place, gold medalist(s)	Eronilde de Araújo	Athletics	Men's 400 metres	28 July
1st place, gold medalist(s)	Elisângela Adriano	Athletics	Women's discus throw	30 July
1st place, gold medalist(s)	Raphael de Oliveira; Claudinei da Silva; Édson Ribeiro; André da Silva	Athletics	Men's 4 × 100 metres relay	30 July
1st place, gold medalist(s)	Robert Scheidt	Sailing	Men's Laser class	31 July
1st place, gold medalist(s)	Brazil women's national volleyball team	Volleyball	Women's tournament	1 August
1st place, gold medalist(s)	Gustavo Borges	Swimming	Men's 200 metre freestyle	2 August
1st place, gold medalist(s)	Shelda Bede; Adriana Behar	Beach volleyball	Women's tournament	4 August
1st place, gold medalist(s)	Leonardo Costa	Swimming	Men's 200 metre backstroke	4 August
1st place, gold medalist(s)	Fernando Scherer	Swimming	Men's 100 metre freestyle	4 August
1st place, gold medalist(s)	Vânia Ishii	Judo	Women's 63 kg	5 August
1st place, gold medalist(s)	Joana Cortez; Vanessa Menga	Tennis	Women's doubles	5 August
1st place, gold medalist(s)	André Sá; Paulo Taicher	Tennis	Men's doubles	5 August
1st place, gold medalist(s)	Luiz Lima	Swimming	Men's 400 metre freestyle	5 August
1st place, gold medalist(s)	Fernando Scherer; César Quintaes; André Cordeiro; Gustavo Borges	Swimming	Men's 4 × 100 metre freestyle relay	5 August
1st place, gold medalist(s)	Fernando Scherer	Swimming	Men's 50 metre freestyle	6 August
1st place, gold medalist(s)	Bernardo Alves; Vitor Alves Teixeira; Álvaro de Miranda Neto; André Johannpeter	Equestrian	Team jumping	7 August
1st place, gold medalist(s)	Alexandre Massura; Marcelo Tomazini; Fernando Scherer; Gustavo Borges	Swimming	Men's 4 × 100 metre medley relay	7 August
1st place, gold medalist(s)	Brazil women's national handball team	Handball	Women's tournament	8 August
1st place, gold medalist(s)	Brazil men's national basketball team	Basketball	Men's tournament	8 August
1st place, gold medalist(s)	Brazil	Gymnastics	Women's rhythmic group all-around	8 August
2nd place, silver medalist(s)	Sebastián Cuattrin	Canoeing	K-1 1000 metres	22 July
2nd place, silver medalist(s)	Sebastián Cuattrin; Carlos Augusto Campos	Canoeing	K-2 1000 metres	22 July
2nd place, silver medalist(s)	Carla Moreno	Triathlon	Women's	24 July
2nd place, silver medalist(s)	Elenilson da Silva	Athletics	Men's 5000 metres	24 July
2nd place, silver medalist(s)	Gibran Cunha; Alexandre Soares	Rowing	Men's coxless pair-oared shells	26 July
2nd place, silver medalist(s)	Antônio Pinto	Karate	Men's 75 kg	26 July
2nd place, silver medalist(s)	Maria Cecília Maia	Karate	Women's 60 kg	26 July
2nd place, silver medalist(s)	Nelson Sardenberg	Karate	Men's 80 kg	26 July
2nd place, silver medalist(s)	Altamiro Cruz	Karate	Men's +80 kg	26 July
2nd place, silver medalist(s)	Daiane dos Santos	Gymnastics	Women's vault	27 July
2nd place, silver medalist(s)	Lucimar de Moura	Athletics	Women's 200 metres	28 July
2nd place, silver medalist(s)	Luciane Dambacher	Athletics	Women's high jump	30 July
2nd place, silver medalist(s)	Maurren Maggi	Athletics	Women's 100 metres hurdles	30 July
2nd place, silver medalist(s)	Eronilde de Araújo; Claudinei da Silva; Anderson Jorge dos Santos; Sanderlei Parrela	Athletics	Men's 4 × 400 metres relay	30 July
2nd place, silver medalist(s)	Ricardo Santos	Sailing	Men's sailboard	31 July
2nd place, silver medalist(s)	Fernanda Pinto	Sailing	Women's Europe class	31 July
2nd place, silver medalist(s)	Cláudio Biekarck	Sailing	Lightning class	31 July
2nd place, silver medalist(s)	Cláudio Cardoso; Patrícia Kirschner	Sailing	Hobie 16 Class	31 July
2nd place, silver medalist(s)	Alexandre Paradeda; Flávio Fernandes	Sailing	Snipe class	31 July
2nd place, silver medalist(s)	Denilson Lourenço	Judo	Men's 60 kg	2 August
2nd place, silver medalist(s)	Daniel Hernandes	Judo	Men's +100 kg	2 August
2nd place, silver medalist(s)	Brazil men's national volleyball team	Volleyball	Men's tournament	2 August
2nd place, silver medalist(s)	Leonardo Costa; Rodrigo Castro; André Cordeiro; Gustavo Borges	Swimming	Men's 4 × 200 metre freestyle relay	3 August
2nd place, silver medalist(s)	Serguei Fofanoff; Marcelo Tosi; Artemus de Almeida; Luciano Drubi	Equestrian	Team Three-Day	4 August
2nd place, silver medalist(s)	Lula Barbosa; Adriano Garrido	Beach volleyball	Men's tournament	4 August
2nd place, silver medalist(s)	Flávio Canto	Judo	Men's 81 kg	5 August
2nd place, silver medalist(s)	Alexandre Massura	Swimming	Men's 100 metre backstroke	6 August
2nd place, silver medalist(s)	Luiz Lima	Swimming	Men's 1500 metre freestyle	7 August
2nd place, silver medalist(s)	Brazil men's national handball team	Handball	Men's tournament	7 August
2nd place, silver medalist(s)	Ronivaldo Conceição; Mário de Oliveira; Luciano Barbosa; Luiz Borges	Squash	Men's team	7 August
2nd place, silver medalist(s)	Kelson Santos	Boxing	Men's Light welterweight	7 August
2nd place, silver medalist(s)	Laudelino Barros	Boxing	Men's Light heavyweight	7 August
3rd place, bronze medalist(s)	Sebastián Cuattrin; Carlos Augusto Campos; André Lúcio Caye; Roger Caumo	Canoeing	K-4 1000 metres	22 July
3rd place, bronze medalist(s)	Carlos Augusto Campos	Canoeing	K-1 500 metres	23 July
3rd place, bronze medalist(s)	Sebastián Cuattrin; Carlos Augusto Campos	Canoeing	K-2 500 metres	23 July
3rd place, bronze medalist(s)	Brazil	Gymnastics	Women's artistic team all-around	24 July
3rd place, bronze medalist(s)	Éder Fialho	Athletics	Men's marathon	25 July
3rd place, bronze medalist(s)	Márcio May	Cycling	Men's road time trial	25 July
3rd place, bronze medalist(s)	Viviany de Oliveira	Athletics	Women's marathon	25 July
3rd place, bronze medalist(s)	Claudinei Silva	Athletics	Men's 100 metres	25 July
3rd place, bronze medalist(s)	Brazil	Table tennis	Women's team	26 July
3rd place, bronze medalist(s)	Brazil	Table tennis	Men's team	26 July
3rd place, bronze medalist(s)	Sidirley Souza	Karate	Men's 60 kg	26 July
3rd place, bronze medalist(s)	Célio Vieiro	Karate	Men's 70 kg	26 July
3rd place, bronze medalist(s)	Massimiliano Pagano	Karate	Men's 75 kg	26 July
3rd place, bronze medalist(s)	Luiz Carlos Graça	Shooting	Men's Double Trap	27 July
3rd place, bronze medalist(s)	Daiane dos Santos	Gymnastics	Women's floor	27 July
3rd place, bronze medalist(s)	Brazil national roller hockey team	Roller sports	Roller hockey	27 July
3rd place, bronze medalist(s)	Janaína Espíndola	Roller sports	Women's free skating	30 July
3rd place, bronze medalist(s)	Diego Alencar	Roller sports	Men's free skating	30 July
3rd place, bronze medalist(s)	Luciana Roiha; Max Santos	Roller sports	Dance	30 July
3rd place, bronze medalist(s)	Brazil women's national water polo team	Water polo	Women's tournament	30 July
3rd place, bronze medalist(s)	Hudson de Souza	Athletics	Men's 1500 metres	30 July
3rd place, bronze medalist(s)	Bruno Prada	Sailing	Men's Finn class	31 July
3rd place, bronze medalist(s)	Christina Forte	Sailing	Women's sailboard	31 July
3rd place, bronze medalist(s)	Isabela Maruccui	Sailing	Women's Laser Radial class	31 July
3rd place, bronze medalist(s)	Priscila Marques	Judo	Women's +78 kg	2 August
3rd place, bronze medalist(s)	Leonardo Costa	Swimming	Men's 200 metre freestyle	2 August
3rd place, bronze medalist(s)	Monique Ferreira; Nayara Ribeiro; Tatiana Lemos; Ana Muniz	Swimming	Women's 4 × 200 metre freestyle relay	2 August
3rd place, bronze medalist(s)	Fabiane Hukuda	Judo	Women's 52 kg	3 August
3rd place, bronze medalist(s)	Edinanci Silva	Judo	Women's 78 kg	3 August
3rd place, bronze medalist(s)	Marcelo Figueiredo	Judo	Men's 100 kg	3 August
3rd place, bronze medalist(s)	Ronivaldo Conceição	Squash	Men's singles	3 August
3rd place, bronze medalist(s)	Danielle Zangrando	Judo	Women's 57 kg	3 August
3rd place, bronze medalist(s)	Janildes Fernandes	Cycling	Women's road race	4 August
3rd place, bronze medalist(s)	Sebastian Pereira	Judo	Men's 73 kg	4 August
3rd place, bronze medalist(s)	Roberto Lopes; Franco Neto	Beach volleyball	Men's tournament	4 August
3rd place, bronze medalist(s)	Paulo Taicher	Tennis	Men's singles	4 August
3rd place, bronze medalist(s)	Gustavo Borges	Swimming	Men's 100 metre freestyle	4 August
3rd place, bronze medalist(s)	Juliana Machado; Rebeca Gusmão; Flávia Delaroli; Tatiana Lemos	Swimming	Women's 4 × 100 metre freestyle relay	4 August
3rd place, bronze medalist(s)	Marcelino Novaes	Boxing	Men's Super heavyweight	4 August
3rd place, bronze medalist(s)	Cláudio Silva	Boxing	Men's Light heavyweight	5 August
3rd place, bronze medalist(s)	Carolina Moraes; Isabela Moraes	Synchronized swimming	Women's duet	6 August
3rd place, bronze medalist(s)	Fabíola Molina; Tatiana Schuh; Patrícia Comini; Tatiana Lemos	Swimming	Women's 4 × 100 metre medley relay	6 August
3rd place, bronze medalist(s)	Carmen Amazonas; Adriana de Moura; Karen Redfern; Flávia Roberts	Squash	Women's team	7 August
3rd place, bronze medalist(s)	Vitor Alves Teixeira	Equestrian	Individual jumping	8 August

**Medals by sport**
**Sport**	1st place, gold medalist(s)	2nd place, silver medalist(s)	3rd place, bronze medalist(s)	Total
Athletics	7	5	4	16
Swimming	7	3	5	15
Tennis	2	0	1	3
Sailing	1	5	3	9
Karate	1	4	3	8
Judo	1	3	6	10
Gymnastics	1	1	2	4
Beach volleyball	1	1	1	3
Equestrian	1	1	1	3
Handball	1	1	0	2
Volleyball	1	1	0	2
Basketball	1	0	0	1
Canoeing	0	2	3	5
Boxing	0	2	2	4
Squash	0	1	2	3
Rowing	0	1	0	1
Triathlon	0	1	0	1
Roller sports	0	0	4	4
Cycling	0	0	2	2
Table tennis	0	0	2	2
Synchronized swimming	0	0	1	1
Shooting	0	0	1	1
Water polo	0	0	1	1
**Total**	**25**	**32**	**44**	101

**Medals by day**
**Day**	1st place, gold medalist(s)	2nd place, silver medalist(s)	3rd place, bronze medalist(s)	**Total**
July 22	0	2	1	3
July 23	0	0	2	2
July 24	1	2	1	4
July 25	1	0	4	5
July 26	1	5	5	11
July 27	1	1	3	5
July 28	2	1	0	3
July 29	0	0	0	0
July 30	2	3	5	10
July 31	1	5	3	9
August 1	1	0	0	1
August 2	1	3	3	7
August 3	0	1	5	6
August 4	3	2	7	12
August 5	5	1	1	7
August 6	1	1	2	4
August 7	2	5	1	8
August 8	3	0	1	4
**Total**	**25**	**32**	**44**	**101**

**Medals by gender**
**Gender**	1st place, gold medalist(s)	2nd place, silver medalist(s)	3rd place, bronze medalist(s)	**Total**
Male	16	24	25	65
Female	9	7	18	34
Mixed	0	1	1	2
**Total**	**25**	**32**	**44**	**101**

== Athletics ==
Men
Track & road events

Athlete	Event	Heat		Semifinal		Final	
Athlete	Event	Result	Rank	Result	Rank	Result	Rank
Claudinei da Silva	100m	—N/a		10.19	1 Q	10.13	3rd place, bronze medalist(s)
André da Silva	100m	—N/a		10.35	5 q	10.21	5
Claudinei da Silva	200 m	—N/a		20.14	1 Q	20.30	1st place, gold medalist(s)
Édson Ribeiro	200 m	—N/a		20.84	7 Q	21.09	6
Sanderlei Parrela	400 m	—N/a		44.70	1 Q	44.93	4
Anderson Jorge dos Santos	400 m	—N/a		45.54	5 Q	45.77	7
Hudson de Souza	800 m	—N/a		Did not start		Did not advance	
Hudson de Souza	1500 m	—N/a				3:42.18	3rd place, bronze medalist(s)
Elenilson da Silva	5000 m	—N/a				13:43.13	2nd place, silver medalist(s)
Elenilson da Silva	10,000m	—N/a				28:43.50	1st place, gold medalist(s)
Luiz André Balcers	110 m hurdles	—N/a		13.46	4 q	13.64	7
Márcio de Souza	110 m hurdles	—N/a		13.67	9	Did not advance	
Eronilde de Araújo	400 m hurdles	—N/a		48.83	2 Q	48.23	1st place, gold medalist(s)
Cleverson da Silva	400 m hurdles	—N/a		49.68	5 Q	49.10	5
Vanderlei de Lima	Marathon	—N/a				2:17:20	1st place, gold medalist(s)
Éder Fialho	Marathon	—N/a				2:20:09	3rd place, bronze medalist(s)
Raphael de Oliveira; Claudinei da Silva; Édson Ribeiro; André da Silva	4 × 100 m relay	—N/a		38.67	1 Q	38.18	1st place, gold medalist(s)
Eronilde de Araújo; Claudinei da Silva; Anderson Jorge dos Santos; Sanderlei Parrela	4 × 400 m relay	—N/a		3:01.04	4 Q	2:58.56	2nd place, silver medalist(s)

Field events

Athlete	Event	Qualification		Final	
Athlete	Event	Distance	Position	Distance	Position
Fabrício Romero	High jump	—N/a		2.20	4
Gustavo Rehder	Pole vault	—N/a		5.10	5
Nélson Carlos Ferreira	Long jump	—N/a		7.77	5
Édson Miguel	Shot put	—N/a		17.99	4

Women
Track & road events

Athlete	Event	Heat		Semifinal		Final	
Athlete	Event	Result	Rank	Result	Rank	Result	Rank
Lucimar Moura	100 m	—N/a		11.42	6 q	11.29	6
Lucimar Moura	200 m	—N/a		23.20	4 Q	23.03	2nd place, silver medalist(s)
Márcia Narloch	10,000 m	—N/a				34:13.65	6
Maurren Maggi	100 m hurdles	—N/a				12.86	2nd place, silver medalist(s)
Ana Paula Pereira	400 m hurdles	—N/a		59.69	8 q	57.92	8
Viviany de Oliveira	Marathon	—N/a				2:40:55	3rd place, bronze medalist(s)

Field events

Athlete	Event	Qualification		Final	
Athlete	Event	Distance	Position	Distance	Position
Luciane Dambacher	High jump	—N/a		1.85	2nd place, silver medalist(s)
Fabiana Murer	Pole vault	—N/a		3.50	9
Maurren Maggi	Long jump	—N/a		6.59	1st place, gold medalist(s)
Luciana dos Santos	Long jump	—N/a		6.13	9
Luciana dos Santos	Triple jump	—N/a		did not start	
Elisângela Adriano	Shot put	—N/a		18.00	4
Elisângela Adriano	Discus throw	—N/a		60.92	1st place, gold medalist(s)
Sueli dos Santos	Javelin throw	—N/a		52.58	6

Combined events – Heptathlon

Athlete	Event	110H	HJ	SP	200 m	LJ	JT	800 m	Final	Rank
Euzinete dos Reis	Result								5778	4
Euzinete dos Reis	Points								5778	4

== Badminton ==
Men

Athlete	Event	First round	Round of 16	Quarterfinals	Semifinals	Final	Rank
Athlete	Event	Opposition Result	Opposition Result	Opposition Result	Opposition Result	Opposition Result	Rank
Guilherme Pardo	Singles	Athlestog (BAR); W 1-0^{r}	López (MEX); W 2-1	Carulla (PER); L 0-2	Did not advance		
Guilherme Kumasaka	Singles	Charles (TTO); W 2-0	Arthur (CAN); L 0-2	Did not advance			
Leandro Santos	Singles	Stjeward (SUR); W 2-0	Han (USA); L 0-2	Did not advance			
Guilherme Kumasaka; Leandro Santos	Men's doubles	—N/a	Carter / Athlestog (BAR); W W.O.	Bach / Manha (USA); L 0-2	Did not advance		
Guilherme Pardo; Ricardo Trevelin	Men's doubles	—N/a	Bye	Lopezllera / Monreal (MEX); L 1-2	Did not advance		

Women

Athlete	Event	First round	Round of 16	Quarterfinals	Semifinals	Final	Rank
Athlete	Event	Opposition Result	Opposition Result	Opposition Result	Opposition Result	Opposition Result	Rank
Cristina Nakano	Singles	Bye	Solmundson (CAN); L 0-2	Did not advance			
Fernanda Kumasaka	Singles	Rodríguez (MEX); L 1-2	Did not advance				
Fernanda Kumasaka; Cristina Nakano	Women's doubles	—N/a	Bye	Cloutier / Hermitage (CAN); L 0-2	Did not advance		

Mixed

Athlete	Event	First round	Second round	Quarterfinals	Semifinals	Final	Rank
Athlete	Event	Opposition Result	Opposition Result	Opposition Result	Opposition Result	Opposition Result	Rank
Leandro Santos; Fernanda Kumasaka	Mixed doubles	—N/a	Carulla / Kocsis (PER); L 0-2	Did not advance			
Ricardo Trevelin; Cristina Nakano	Mixed doubles	—N/a	Graham (TTO); Cupidon (JAM); L 1-2	Did not advance			

== Baseball ==
Summary

Team	Event	Group stage					Quarterfinal	Semifinal	Final / BM
Team	Event	Opposition Result	Opposition Result	Opposition Result	Rank	Opposition Result	Opposition Result	Opposition Result	Rank
Brazil men	Men's tournament	Canada; L 4-16	Mexico; L 0-10	Cuba; L 1-10	United States; L 2-3	5	Did not advance		

== Basketball ==
Summary

Team	Event	Group stage						Semifinal	Final / BM / Pl.	
Team	Event	Opposition Result	Opposition Result	Opposition Result	Opposition Result	Opposition Result	Rank	Opposition Result	Opposition Result	Rank
Brazil men	Men's tournament	Dominican Republic; W 102-72	United States; L 71-73	Cuba; W 86-72	—N/a		2 Q	Puerto Rico; W 95-85	United States; W 95-78	1st place, gold medalist(s)
Brazil women	Women's tournament	Cuba; W 84-78	Dominican Republic; W 124-68	Canada; W 70-59	United States; W 77-72	Argentina; W 67-65	1 Q	Canada; L 54-56	United States; L 59-85	4

== Boxing ==
Men

Athlete	Event	Round of 16	Quarterfinal	Semifinal	Final	
Athlete	Event	Opposition Result	Opposition Result	Opposition Result	Opposition Result	Rank
José Albuquerque	–48 kg	Nelson González (GUA); W 9 - 4	Maikro Romero (CUB); L W.O.	Did not advance		
Antônio de Jesus	–51 kg	Alexander Espinosa (VEN); L 5 - 15	Did not advance			
Valdemir Pereira	–57 kg	Michel Agard (TTO); W RSC	Jorge Martínez (MEX); L 5 - 5	Did not advance		
Kelson Santos	–63.5 kg	Edwin Algarin (PUR); W 19 - 5	Adams Trupish (CAN); W 6 - 5	Corey Bernard (USA); W 10 - 4	Victor Hugo Castro (ARG); L 1 - 8	2nd place, silver medalist(s)
Jorge Mello	–75 kg	Domingo Paulino (DOM); L 6 - 10	Did not advance			
Laudelino Barros	–81 kg	Bye	Joseph Pastorello (USA); W 3 - 2	Hugo Garay (ARG); W 5 - 3	Humberto Savigne (CUB); L RSC	2nd place, silver medalist(s)
Marcelino Novaes	–91 kg	Bye	Sebastián Stiell (GRN); W RSC	Odlanier Solis (CUB); L 13 - 2	Did not advance	3rd place, bronze medalist(s)
Cláudio Silva	+91 kg	Bye	Laurie Cuffy (ISV); W 9 - 7	Alexis Rubalcaba (CUB); L RSC	Did not advance	3rd place, bronze medalist(s)

== Bowling ==
Athlete	Event		
Athlete	Event	Total	Rank
Walter Costa; Juliano Oliveira; Carlos da Cruz; Márcio Vieira	Men's team		
Lúcia Vieira	Women's singles	2959	13th
Jacqueline Costa; Mary Ministério; Lúcia Vieira; Marilza Yasuoka	Women's team		

== Canoeing ==
=== Sprint ===
Men

Athlete	Event	Final	
Athlete	Event	Time	Rank
Carlos Augusto Campos	K-1 500 m	1:41.740	3rd place, bronze medalist(s)
Carlos Augusto Campos; Sebastian Cuattrin	K-2 500 m	1:33.570	3rd place, bronze medalist(s)
Sebastian Cuattrin	K-1 1000 m	3:42.683	2nd place, silver medalist(s)
Carlos Augusto Campos; Sebastian Cuattrin	K-2 1000 m	3:34.862	2nd place, silver medalist(s)
Carlos Augusto Campos; Sebastian Cuattrin; André Lúcio Caye; Roger Caumo	K-4 1000 m	3:19.780	3rd place, bronze medalist(s)
Rogério Santos	C-1 500 m	DSQ	DSQ
Rogério Santos; Hélio Araújo	C-2 500 m	1:53.730	5
Antônio Borges	C-1 1000 m	4:39.970	6
	C-2 1000 m	4:32.020	5

== Diving ==
Men

Athlete	Event	Final	
Athlete	Event	Score	Rank
Cassius Duran	3 m springboard	587.07	8
Emerson Neves	3 m springboard	518.16	10
Cassius Duran	10 m platform	506.94	10
Emerson Neves	10 m platform	474.15	11

Women

Athlete	Event	Final	
Athlete	Event	Score	Rank
Juliana Veloso	3 m springboard	445.68	8
Evelyn Winkler	3 m springboard	412.17	9
Juliana Veloso	10 m platform	448.47	6

== Equestrian ==
=== Dressage ===
Athlete	Horse	Event	Total	
Athlete	Horse	Event	Points	Rank
		Team	4077	5

=== Three-Day ===
Athlete	Horse	Event	Total	
Athlete	Horse	Event	Points	Rank
Artemus de Almeida; Luciano Drubi; Serguei Fofanoff; Marcelo Tosi	As above	Team	639	2nd place, silver medalist(s)

=== Jumping ===
Athlete	Horse	Event	Final	
Athlete	Horse	Event	Total	
Athlete	Horse	Event	Faults	Rank
Vitor Alves Teixeira	Jolly Boy	Individual	11.62	3rd place, bronze medalist(s)
André Johannpeter	Calei Joter	Individual	12.17	4th
Bernardo Alves	Athletica	Individual	13.50	6th
Vitor Alves Teixeira; André Johannpeter; Bernardo Alves; Álvaro Affonso de Miranda Neto	As above	Team	10.79	1st place, gold medalist(s)

== Gymnastics ==
=== Artistic ===
Men
Team & Individual Qualification

Athlete	Event	Final							
Athlete	Event	Apparatus						Total	Rank
Athlete	Event	F	PH	R	V	PB	HB	Total	Rank
	Team								
Total	Team							202.925	7

Qualification Legend: Q = Qualified to apparatus final

Individual finals

Athlete	Event	Apparatus						Total	
Athlete	Event	F	PH	R	V	PB	HB	Score	Rank
Gustavo Barreto	Pommel horse	—N/a	7.750	—N/a				7.750	8
Kleber Sato	Rings	—N/a		9.375	—N/a			9.375	6
Michel Conceição	Vault	—N/a			9.012	—N/a		9.012	7

Women
Team & Individual Qualification

Athlete	Event	Final					
Athlete	Event	Apparatus				Total	Rank
Athlete	Event	V	UB	BB	F	Total	Rank
	Team						
Total	Team					147.639	3rd place, bronze medalist(s)

Qualification Legend: Q = Qualified to apparatus final

Individual finals

Athlete	Event	Apparatus				Total	
Athlete	Event	V	UB	BB	F	Score	Rank
Daniele Hypólito	All-around					36.961	7
Heine Araújo	All-around					35.818	12
Camila Comin	All-around					34.837	15
Daiane dos Santos	Vault	9.387	—N/a			9.387	2nd place, silver medalist(s)
Daniele Hypólito	Vault	8.756	—N/a			8.756	7
Marilia Gomes	Uneven bars	—N/a	9.487	—N/a		9.487	5
Marilia Gomes	Balance beam	—N/a		9.100	—N/a	9.100	4
Daiane dos Santos	Floor	—N/a			9.612	9.612	3rd place, bronze medalist(s)

=== Rhythmic ===
Group

Athlete	Event	Total	
Athlete	Event	Score	Rank
Alessandra Ferezin; Camila Ferezin; Dayane Camilo; Flávia Faria; Michelle Salzano; Juliana Coradine	All-around	38.431	1st place, gold medalist(s)

== Handball ==
Summary

Team	Event	Group stage							Semifinal	Final / BM
Team	Event	Opposition Result	Opposition Result	Opposition Result	Opposition Result	Opposition Result	Rank	Opposition Result	Opposition Result	Rank
Brazil men	Men's tournament	Uruguay; W 32–9	Cuba; L 17–20	—N/a			2 Q	Argentina; W 23-22	Cuba; L 32–32 (PS:3-4)	2nd place, silver medalist(s)
Brazil women	Women's tournament	Canada; W 33-23	Cuba; W 37-27	United States; T 22–22	Uruguay; W 33–14	Argentina; W 32–23	1 Q	Cuba; W 29-18	Canada; W 31-27	1st place, gold medalist(s)

== Modern pentathlon ==
Athlete	Event		
Athlete	Event	Total points	Rank
Nilton Rolim	Men's	4767	8th
Roberta Santana	Women's	3721	8th
Gisela Ferraz	Women's	3070	9th

== Roller sports ==
=== Figure ===
Athlete	Event	Total	
Athlete	Event	Score	Rank
Diego Alencar	Men's	340.1	3rd place, bronze medalist(s)
Janaína Espíndola	Women's	174.8	3rd place, bronze medalist(s)
Max Santos; Luciana Roiha	Mixed doubles	343.8	3rd place, bronze medalist(s)

=== Hockey ===
Summary

Team	Event	Group stage						Semifinal	Final / BM
Team	Event	Opposition Result	Opposition Result	Opposition Result	Opposition Result	Rank	Opposition Result	Opposition Result	Rank
Brazil men	Roller hockey	Canada; L 1-12	Uruguay; W 5-0	United States; L 1-10	Argentina; W 6-2	3 Q	Canada; L 1-15	Argentina; L 2-4	(bronze) *

- Canada disqualified due to doping of goalie

== Rowing ==
Men

Athlete	Event	Final	
Athlete	Event	Time	Rank
Anderson Nocetti	Single sculls	5:50.16	5th
Alexandre Soares; Gibran Cunha	Pair	6:40.75	2nd place, silver medalist(s)
Thiago Gomes; Luís Fernando Prataviera	Double sculls	6:39.69	5th
	Four	6:15.91	6th
	Eight	5:50.16	5th

Women

Athlete	Event	Final	
Athlete	Event	Time	Rank
Monica Anversa	Single sculls	8:10.20	5th
Katia Alencar; Cláudia Alencar	Double sculls	7:37.22	6th

== Sailing ==
Men

Athlete	Event		
Athlete	Event	Total points	Final rank
Ricardo Santos	Sailboard	15	2nd place, silver medalist(s)
Robert Scheidt	Laser	8	1st place, gold medalist(s)
Bruno Prada	Finn	20	3rd place, bronze medalist(s)

Women

Athlete	Event		
Athlete	Event	Total points	Final rank
Christina Forte	Sailboard	22	3rd place, bronze medalist(s)
Isabela Maracucci	Laser radial	20	3rd place, bronze medalist(s)
Fernanda Pinto	Europe	14	2nd place, silver medalist(s)

Open

Athlete	Event		
Athlete	Event	Total points	Final rank
Claudio Biekarck; Marcelo Batista; Gunnar Ficker	Lightning	17	2nd place, silver medalist(s)
Cláudio Cardoso; Patrícia Kirschner	Hobie 16	17	2nd place, silver medalist(s)
Flávio Fernandes; Alexandre Paradeda	Snipe	15	2nd place, silver medalist(s)

== Shooting ==
Men

Pistol and rifle

Athlete	Event	Final	
Athlete	Event	Points	Rank
Gabriel Grunberg	50 m pistol	632.0	6th

Shotgun

Athlete	Event	Final / BM	
Athlete	Event	Points	Rank
Luiz Graça	Double Trap	181	3rd place, bronze medalist(s)
José Brito	Double Trap	175	6th

Women

Pistol and rifle

Athlete	Event	Final	
Athlete	Event	Points	Rank
Rachel Silveira	25 m pistol	664.1	5th

Shotgun

Athlete	Event	Final / BM	
Athlete	Event	Points	Rank
Janice Teixeira	Trap	81	5th

== Swimming ==
Brazil has qualified 26 athletes total, 14 men and 12 women:

Men

Event	Athletes	Heats		Final	
Event	Athletes	Time	Position	Time	Position
50 m freestyle	Fernando Scherer	22.24	1 Q	22.24	1st place, gold medalist(s)
50 m freestyle	Gustavo Borges			23.06	4
100 m freestyle	Fernando Scherer	49.45	1 Q	49.19	1st place, gold medalist(s)
100 m freestyle	Gustavo Borges			50.10	3rd place, bronze medalist(s)
200 m freestyle	Gustavo Borges	1:50.99	1 Q	1:49.41	1st place, gold medalist(s)
200 m freestyle	Leonardo Costa	1:52.51	5 Q	1:51.29	3rd place, bronze medalist(s)
400 m freestyle	Luiz Lima			3:52.25	1st place, gold medalist(s)
400 m freestyle	Cassiano Leal			4:00.04	10
1500 m freestyle	Luiz Lima			15:21.92	2nd place, silver medalist(s)
100 m backstroke	Alexandre Massura			55.17	2nd place, silver medalist(s)
100 m backstroke	Leonardo Costa			56.28	9
200 m backstroke	Leonardo Costa			1:59.33	1st place, gold medalist(s)
100 m breaststroke	Marcelo Tomazini	1:04.04	4	1:03.72	4
100 m breaststroke	Alan Pessotti			1:05.34	12
200 m breaststroke	Marcelo Tomazini			2:17.04	4
200 m breaststroke	Fábio Mauro Silva			2:22.14	8
100 m butterfly	Gabriel Mangabeira			55.81	11
200 m individual medley	Stephan Batista			2:06.20	4
200 m individual medley	Gabriel Mangabeira			2:09.90	11
4 × 100 m freestyle relay	Fernando Scherer; César Quintaes; André Cordeiro; Gustavo Borges			3:17.18	1st place, gold medalist(s)
4 × 200 m freestyle relay	Leonardo Costa; Rodrigo Castro; André Cordeiro; Gustavo Borges			7:22.92	2nd place, silver medalist(s)
4 × 100 m medley relay	Alexandre Massura; Marcelo Tomazini; Fernando Scherer; Gustavo Borges			3:40.27	1st place, gold medalist(s)

Women

Event	Athletes	Heats		Final	
Event	Athletes	Time	Position	Time	Position
50 m freestyle	Flávia Delaroli			26.27	4
50 m freestyle	Tatiana Lemos			26.66	6
100 m freestyle	Tatiana Lemos	57.70	5 Q	57.29	5
100 m freestyle	Rebeca Gusmão	58.66	8 Q	58.48	8
200 m freestyle	Ana Muniz			2:06.08	6
200 m freestyle	Nayara Ribeiro			2:06.79	7
400 m freestyle	Ana Muniz			4:19.47	5
400 m freestyle	Nayara Ribeiro			4:19.75	6
800 m freestyle	Ana Muniz			8:52.36	6
800 m freestyle	Nayara Ribeiro			8:57.61	7
100 m backstroke	Fabíola Molina			1:03.57	5
100 m backstroke	Cristiane Nakama			1:05.25	7
200 m backstroke	Fabíola Molina			2:18.12	6
200 m backstroke	Cristiane Nakama			2:21.21	7
100 m breaststroke	Patrícia Comini			1:13.10	7
200 m breaststroke	Patrícia Comini			2:37.69	7
100 m butterfly	Tanya Schuh			1:03.64	8
100 m butterfly	Monique Ferreira			1:04.08	9
200 m butterfly	Patrícia Comini			2:18.23	5
200 m butterfly	Monique Ferreira			2:18.28	6
200 m individual medley	Fabíola Molina			2:20.07	6
200 m individual medley	Bárbara Jatobá			2:28.33	9
400 m individual medley	Fabíola Molina	4:54.58	3 Q	4:54.38	4
400 m individual medley	Bárbara Jatobá	5:07.32	8 Q	5:07.02	8
4 × 100 m freestyle relay	Juliana Machado; Rebeca Gusmão; Flávia Delaroli; Tatiana Lemos			3:50.37	3rd place, bronze medalist(s)
4 × 200 m freestyle relay	Monique Ferreira; Nayara Ribeiro; Tatiana Lemos; Ana Muniz			8:25.07	3rd place, bronze medalist(s)
4 × 100 m medley relay	Fabíola Molina; Tanya Schuh; Patrícia Comini; Tatiana Lemos			4:02.52	3rd place, bronze medalist(s)

== Synchronized swimming ==
Brazil has qualified a full team of nine athletes.

Athlete	Event	Final	
Athlete	Event	Total points	Rank
Carolina Moraes; Isabela Moraes	Women's duet	94.667	3rd place, bronze medalist(s)
	Women's team	92.489	4

== Tennis ==
Men

Athlete	Event	Round of 64	Round of 32	Round of 16	Quarterfinal	Semifinal	Final / BM	
Athlete	Event	Opposition Result	Opposition Result	Opposition Result	Opposition Result	Opposition Result	Opposition Result	Rank
Paulo Taicher	Singles	Bye	Boulet (CAN); W 7 – 6, 6 – 4	Navarro-Batles (CUB); W 6 – 4, 6 – 4	Ortiz (MEX); W 7 – 6, 6 – 4	Goldstein (USA); L 4 – 6, 4 – 6	Did not advance	3rd place, bronze medalist(s)
André Sá	Singles	Bye	Kritchley (CAN); W 6 – 4, 6 – 4	Nalbandian (ARG); L 6 – 1, 3 – 6, 4 - 6	Did not advance			
Daniel Melo	Singles	Bye	Stone (TTO); W 6 – 2, 6 – 0	Gamonal (CHI); W 6 – 3, 6 – 3	Goldstein (USA); L 4 – 6, 4 – 6	Did not advance		
André Sá; Paulo Taicher	Doubles	—N/a	Bye	Barthold / Lacombe (HAI); W 6 – 1, 6 – 0	Abelson / Critchley (CAN); W 3 – 6, 6 – 3, 7 - 5	Romero / Ruah (VEN); W 3 – 6, 6 – 4, 6 - 3	Ortiz / Osorio (MEX); W 7 – 6, 6 – 2	1st place, gold medalist(s)

Women

Athlete	Event	Round of 32	Round of 16	Quarterfinal	Semifinal	Final / BM	
Athlete	Event	Opposition Result	Opposition Result	Opposition Result	Opposition Result	Opposition Result	Rank
Joana Cortez	Singles	Cordova (CUB); W 6 – 2, 7 - 6	Snyder (USA); L 4 – 6, 2 – 6	Did not advance			
Vanessa Menga	Singles	Bye	Baillie (TTO); W 6 – 2, 6 – 2	Oliva (ARG); L 4 – 6, 3 – 6	Did not advance		
Miriam D'Agostini	Singles	Stevenson (USA); L 2 – 6, 0 - 6	Did not advance				
Joana Cortez; Vanessa Menga	Doubles	—N/a	Bye	Sequera / Vento (VEN); W 4 – 6, 6 – 4, 6 - 4	Kolbovic / Soukup (CAN); W 6 – 2, 7 – 6	Cabezas / Castro (CHI); W 6 – 0, 7 – 6	1st place, gold medalist(s)

== Triathlon ==
Brazil qualified a triathlon team of five athletes (two men and three women).

Athlete	Event	Total	Rank
Armando Barcellos	Men's	1:49:48	4
Leandro Macedo	Men's	1:50:25	9
Carla Moreno	Women's	1:59:32	2nd place, silver medalist(s)
Mariana Ohata	Women's	2:02:26	6
Sandra Soldan	Women's	2:02:58	8

== Volleyball ==
=== Beach ===
Athlete	Event	Group stage				Quarterfinal	Semifinal	Final / BM	
Athlete	Event	Opposition Result	Opposition Result	Opposition Result	Rank	Opposition Result	Opposition Result	Opposition Result	Rank
Lula Barbosa; Adriano Garrido	Men's	Juliana – Kalmez (ANT); W 15-0	Goers – Torsone (USA); W 15-11	Ibarra – Sotelo (MEX); W 15-8	1 Q	Bye	Chambers – Milián (CUB); W 16-14	Holden – Leinemann (CAN); L 1–2 (8-12, 12–11, 11-13)	2nd place, silver medalist(s)
Roberto Lopes; Franco Neto	Men's	Sánchez – Sánchez (HON); W 15-0	Velasco – de Jesus (PUR); W	Gatzke – Lewis (CAN); W 15-9	1 Q	Bye	Holden – Leinemann (CAN); L 12-15	Chambers – Milián (CUB); W 2–0 (12-5, 12-9)	3rd place, bronze medalist(s)
Adriana Behar; Shelda Bede	Women's	Pavley – Miller (USA); W 15-6	Zambrano – Abreu (VEN); W 15-3	Ferrer – Blanco (CUB); W 15-0	1 Q	Bye	Broen-Ouelette – Lussier (CAN); W 15-1	Pavley – Miller (USA); W 2–0 (12–5, 12-0)	1st place, gold medalist(s)
Mônica Paludo; Adriana Samuel	Women's	Pagano – Busch (USA); W 15-5	Larrea – Quevedo (CUB); W 15-12	Harkness – Lesage (CAN); W 15-9	1 Q	Pavley – Miller (USA); L 15-17	did not advance		

=== Indoor ===
Summary

Team	Event	Group stage						Semifinal	Final / BM / Pl.	
Team	Event	Opposition Result	Opposition Result	Opposition Result	Opposition Result	Opposition Result	Rank	Opposition Result	Opposition Result	Rank
Brazil men	Men's tournament	Cuba; W 3–2	Barbados; W 3–0	Venezuela; W 3–1	—N/a		1 Q	Canada; W 3-0	Cuba; L 2-3	2nd place, silver medalist(s)
Brazil women	Women's tournament	Peru; W 3–0	United States; W 3–0	Canada; W 3–0	Dominican Republic; W 3–0	Cuba; W 3–2	1 Q	Dominican Republic; W 3-0	Cuba; W 3-2	1st place, gold medalist(s)

== Water polo ==
Summary

Team	Event	Group stage					Semifinal	Final / BM / Pl.	
Team	Event	Opposition Result	Opposition Result	Opposition Result	Opposition Result	Rank	Opposition Result	Opposition Result	Rank
Brazil men	Men's tournament	Canada; L 3-6	Puerto Rico; W 12-4	Argentina; W 7-6	—N/a	2 Q	United States; L 3-7	Canada; L 8-10	4
Brazil women	Women's tournament	Cuba; W 7–4	United States; W 8-6	Puerto Rico; W 20–0	Canada; L 6-13	2 Q	United States; L 5-6 (aet)	Cuba; W 9-4	3rd place, bronze medalist(s)

== See also ==
- Brazil at the 2000 Summer Olympics
