= Swimming at the 1999 Pan American Games – Men's 4 × 200 metre freestyle relay =

Men's 4 × 200 metre freestyle relay at the 1999 Pan American Games
- Venue: Pan Am Pool
- Dates: August 3 (preliminaries and finals)
- Competitors: 32 from 8 nations

Medalists
Gold medal	Adam Messner; Dan Phillips; Devin Howard; Scott Tucker	United States
Silver medal	Leonardo Costa; Rodrigo Castro; André Cordeiro; Gustavo Borges	Brazil
Bronze medal	Mark Johnston; Brian Johns; Yannick Lupien; Rick Say	Canada

The men's 4 × 200 metre freestyle relay competition of the swimming events at the 1999 Pan American Games took place on August 3, 1999, at the Pan Am Pool in Winnipeg, Manitoba. The last Pan American Games champion was the United States.

This race consisted of sixteen lengths of the pool. Each of the four swimmers completed four lengths of the pool. The first swimmer had to touch the wall before the second could leave the starting block.

== Results ==
All times are in minutes and seconds.

KEY:	Q	Qualified	GR	Games record	NR	National record	PB	Personal best	SB	Seasonal best

=== Final ===
The final was held on August 3.

Rank	Nation	Swimmers	Time	Notes
1st place, gold medalist(s)	United States	Adam Messner; Dan Phillips; Devin Howard; Scott Tucker	7:22.29	
2nd place, silver medalist(s)	Brazil	Leonardo Costa; Rodrigo Castro; André Cordeiro; Gustavo Borges	7:22.92	SA
3rd place, bronze medalist(s)	Canada	Mark Johnston; Brian Johns; Yannick Lupien; Rick Say	7:23.02	
4	Venezuela	Francisco Páez; Luis Rojas; Nelson Mora; Manuel Colmenares	7:40.92	
5	Peru	Juan Pablo Valdivieso; J.Martinez; Luis Bracamonte; Luis López	7:57.76	
6	Chile	Giancarlo Zolezzi; Pablo Banfi; M.Burgos; E.Morano	8:00.19	
7	U.S. Virgin Islands	George Gleason; R.Colabella; Josh Laban; A.Smith	8:07.26	
—	Ecuador	- - - -	DSQ	
