= Swimming at the 1999 Pan American Games – Women's 100 metre freestyle =

Women's 100 metre freestyle at the 1999 Pan American Games
- Venue: Pan Am Pool
- Dates: August 2 (preliminaries and finals)
- Competitors: from - nations

Medalists
Gold medal	Laura Nicholls	Canada
Silver medal	Tammie Spatz	United States
Bronze medal	Marianne Limpert	Canada

The women's 100 metre freestyle competition of the swimming events at the 1999 Pan American Games took place on 2 August at the Pan Am Pool. The last Pan American Games champion was Angel Martino of US.

This race consisted of two lengths of the pool, both lengths being in freestyle.

== Results ==
All times are in minutes and seconds.

KEY:	q	Fastest non-qualifiers	Q	Qualified	GR	Games record	NR	National record	PB	Personal best	SB	Seasonal best

=== Heats ===
The first round was held on August 2.

Rank	Name	Nationality	Time	Notes
1	Tammie Spatz	United States	56.49	Q
2	Laura Nicholls	Canada	57.03	Q
3	Jen Eberwein	United States	57.05	Q
4	Marianne Limpert	Canada	57.25	Q
5	Tatiana Lemos	Brazil	57.70	Q
6	Siobhan Cropper	Trinidad and Tobago	57.89	Q
7	Leah Martindale	Barbados	58.64	Q
8	Rebeca Gusmão	Brazil	58.66	Q

=== B Final ===
The B final was held on August 2.

Rank	Name	Nationality	Time	Notes
9	Eileen Coparropa	Panama	57.92	
10	Florencia Szigeti	Argentina	58.76	
11	Talía Barrios	Peru	59.45	
12	Angela Chuck	Jamaica	59.84	
13	S.Mojica	Puerto Rico	1:00.46	
14	Janelle Atkinson	Jamaica	1:06.93	

=== A Final ===
The A final was held on August 2.

Rank	Name	Nationality	Time	Notes
1st place, gold medalist(s)	Laura Nicholls	Canada	56.25	
2nd place, silver medalist(s)	Tammie Spatz	United States	56.44	
3rd place, bronze medalist(s)	Marianne Limpert	Canada	56.69	
4	Jen Eberwein	United States	56.93	
5	Tatiana Lemos	Brazil	57.29	
6	Leah Martindale	Barbados	58.36	
7	Siobhan Cropper	Trinidad and Tobago	58.44	
8	Rebeca Gusmão	Brazil	58.48	
