= Swimming at the 1999 Pan American Games – Women's 200 metre butterfly =

Women's 200 metre butterfly at the 1999 Pan American Games
- Venue: Pan Am Pool
- Dates: August 7 (preliminaries and finals)
- Competitors: from - nations

Medalists
Gold medal	Jessica Deglau	Canada
Silver medal	Jennifer Button	Canada
Bronze medal	Kalyn Keller	United States

The women's 200 metre butterfly competition of the swimming events at the 1999 Pan American Games took place on 7 August at the Pan Am Pool. The last Pan American Games champion was Trina Jackson of US.

This race consisted of four lengths of the pool, all lengths being in butterfly stroke.

== Results ==
All times are in minutes and seconds.

KEY:	q	Fastest non-qualifiers	Q	Qualified	GR	Games record	NR	National record	PB	Personal best	SB	Seasonal best

=== Heats ===
The first round was held on August 7.

Rank	Name	Nationality	Time	Notes
1	Jessica Deglau	Canada	2:10.30	Q
2	-	-	-	Q
3	Kalyn Keller	United States	2:16.01	Q
4	-	-	-	Q
5	-	-	-	Q
6	Ashley Ellis	United States	2:20.27	Q
7	-	-	-	Q
8	-	-	-	Q

=== B Final ===
The B final was held on August 7.

Rank	Name	Nationality	Time	Notes
9	Ana Aguilera	Argentina	2:18.42	
10	Melissa Mata	Costa Rica	2:19.87	
11	María Pereyra	Argentina	2:20.12	
12	Jeanett Yanez	Peru	2:26.10	
13	L.Rivas	Paraguay	2:26.61	
14	Claudia Campino	Uruguay	2:29.76	

=== A Final ===
The A final was held on August 7.

Rank	Name	Nationality	Time	Notes
1st place, gold medalist(s)	Jessica Deglau	Canada	2:09.64	GR
2nd place, silver medalist(s)	Jennifer Button	Canada	2:12.09	
3rd place, bronze medalist(s)	Kalyn Keller	United States	2:14.60	
4	Ashley Ellis	United States	2:18.17	
5	Patrícia Comini	Brazil	2:18.23	
6	Monique Ferreira	Brazil	2:18.28	
7	Paola López	Mexico	2:18.61	
8	Mariela Yepez	Ecuador	2:21.05	
