= Swimming at the 1999 Pan American Games – Men's 4 × 100 metre freestyle relay =

Men's 4 × 100 metre freestyle relay at the 1999 Pan American Games
- Venue: Pan Am Pool
- Dates: August 5 (preliminaries and finals)
- Competitors: from - nations

Medalists
Gold medal	Fernando Scherer, César Quintaes, André Cordeiro and Gustavo Borges	Brazil
Silver medal	Scott Tucker, Dan Phillips, Jarod Schroeder and Justin Ewers	United States
Bronze medal	Luis Rojas, Francisco Páez, José Quevedo and Francisco Sánchez	Venezuela

The men's 4 × 100 metre freestyle relay competition of the swimming events at the 1999 Pan American Games took place on August 5 at the Pan Am Pool. The last Pan American Games champion was the United States.

This race consisted of eight lengths of the pool. Each of the four swimmers completed two lengths of the pool. The first swimmer had to touch the wall before the second could leave the starting block.

== Results ==
All times are in minutes and seconds.

KEY:	q	Fastest non-qualifiers	Q	Qualified	GR	Games record	NR	National record	PB	Personal best	SB	Seasonal best

=== Final ===
The final was held on August 5.

Rank	Name	Nationality	Time	Notes
1st place, gold medalist(s)	Fernando Scherer; César Quintaes; André Cordeiro; Gustavo Borges	Brazil	3:17.18	GR, SA
2nd place, silver medalist(s)	Scott Tucker; Dan Phillips; Jarod Schroeder; Justin Ewers	United States	3:19.00	
3rd place, bronze medalist(s)	Luis Rojas; Francisco Páez; José Quevedo; Francisco Sánchez	Venezuela	3:22.21	
4	- - - -	Canada	3:22.48	
5	- - - -	Bahamas	3:31.46	
6	- - - -	Bermuda	3:36.05	
7	- - - -	Peru	3:39.32	
8	- - - -	U.S. Virgin Islands	3:39.40	
