= Swimming at the 1999 Pan American Games – Women's 50 metre freestyle =

Women's 50 metre freestyle at the 1999 Pan American Games
- Venue: Pan Am Pool
- Dates: August 7 (preliminaries and finals)
- Competitors: from - nations

Medalists
Gold medal	Tammie Spatz	United States
Silver medal	Eileen Coparropa	Panama
Bronze medal	Laura Nicholls	Canada

The women's 50 metre freestyle competition of the swimming events at the 1999 Pan American Games took place on 7 August at the Pan Am Pool.

This race consisted of one length of the pool in freestyle.

The gold medalist was Tammie Spatz of the United States of America. The runner-up, Eileen Coparropa of Panama, won the first ever silver medal for her country in swimming at the Pan American Games.

== Results ==
All times are in minutes and seconds.

KEY:	q	Fastest non-qualifiers	Q	Qualified	GR	Games record	NR	National record	PB	Personal best	SB	Seasonal best

=== Heats ===
The first round was held on August 7.

Rank	Name	Nationality	Time	Notes
1	Tammie Spatz	United States	25.67	Q
2	-	-	-	Q
3	-	-	-	Q
4	Shannon Hosack	United States	26.22	Q
5	-	-	-	Q
6	-	-	-	Q
7	-	-	-	Q
8	-	-	-	Q

=== B Final ===
The B final was held on August 7.

Rank	Name	Nationality	Time	Notes
9	Janet Cook	Canada	26.97	
10	Talía Barrios	Peru	27.22	
11	Florencia Szigeti	Argentina	27.45	
12	S.Mojica	Puerto Rico	27.69	
13	Angela Chuck	Jamaica	28.13	
14	Valeria Silva	Peru	29.06	
15	Aydee Pereyra	Bolivia	29.54	
16	Janelle Atkinson	Jamaica	30.01	

=== A Final ===
The A final was held on August 7.

Rank	Name	Nationality	Time	Notes
1st place, gold medalist(s)	Tammie Spatz	United States	25.50	
2nd place, silver medalist(s)	Eileen Coparropa	Panama	25.78	
3rd place, bronze medalist(s)	Laura Nicholls	Canada	26.10	
4	Shannon Hosack	United States	26.27	
4	Flávia Delaroli	Brazil	26.27	
6	Tatiana Lemos	Brazil	26.66	
7	Siobhan Cropper	Trinidad and Tobago	26.84	
8	Leah Martindale	Barbados	26.91	
