= Swimming at the 1999 Pan American Games – Men's 100 metre freestyle =

Men's 100 metre freestyle at the 1999 Pan American Games
- Venue: Pan Am Pool
- Date: August 4, 1999 (preliminaries and finals)
- Competitors: from - nations

Medalists
Gold medal	Fernando Scherer	Brazil
Silver medal	José Meolans	Argentina
Bronze medal	Gustavo Borges	Brazil

The men's 100 metre freestyle competition of the swimming events at the 1999 Pan American Games took place on August 4 at the Pan Am Pool. The last Pan American Games champion was Gustavo Borges of Brazil.

This race consisted of two lengths of the pool, both lengths being in freestyle.

== Results ==
All times are in minutes and seconds.

KEY:	q	Fastest non-qualifiers	Q	Qualified	GR	Games record	NR	National record	PB	Personal best	SB	Seasonal best

=== Heats ===
The first round was held on August 4.

Rank	Name	Nationality	Time	Notes
1	Fernando Scherer	Brazil	49.45	Q
2	Scott Tucker	United States	50.10	Q
3	-	-	-	Q
4	-	-	-	Q
5	Dan Phillips	United States	50.56	Q
6	-	-	-	Q
7	-	-	-	Q
8	-	-	-	Q

=== B Final ===
The B final was held on August 4.

Rank	Name	Nationality	Time	Notes
9	Francisco Sánchez	Venezuela	50.83	
10	Craig Hutchison	Canada	51.33	
11	Luis Rojas	Venezuela	51.72	
12	Felipe Delgado	Ecuador	51.75	
13	Chris Murray	Bahamas	51.97	
14	Howard Hinds	Netherlands Antilles	52.58	
15	Luiz López	Peru	52.82	
16	Fernando Jácome	Colombia	53.19	

=== A Final ===
The A final was held on August 4.

Rank	Name	Nationality	Time	Notes
1st place, gold medalist(s)	Fernando Scherer	Brazil	49.19	GR
2nd place, silver medalist(s)	José Meolans	Argentina	49.94	
3rd place, bronze medalist(s)	Gustavo Borges	Brazil	50.10	
4	Scott Tucker	United States	50.15	
5	Ricardo Busquets	Puerto Rico	50.40	
6	Marcos Hernández	Cuba	50.52	
7	Dan Phillips	United States	50.71	
8	Yannick Lupien	Canada	50.73	
