= Swimming at the 1999 Pan American Games – Men's 200 metre freestyle =

Men's 200 metre freestyle at the 1999 Pan American Games
- Venue: Pan Am Pool
- Dates: August 2 (preliminaries and finals)
- Competitors: from - nations

Medalists
Gold medal	Gustavo Borges	Brazil
Silver medal	Scott Tucker	United States
Bronze medal	Leonardo Costa	Brazil
Bronze medal	Mark Johnston	Canada

The men's 200 metre freestyle competition of the swimming events at the 1999 Pan American Games took place on 2 August at the Pan Am Pool. The last Pan American Games champion was Gustavo Borges of Brazil.

This race consisted of four lengths of the pool, all in freestyle.

== Results ==
All times are in minutes and seconds.

KEY:	q	Fastest non-qualifiers	Q	Qualified	GR	Games record	NR	National record	PB	Personal best	SB	Seasonal best

=== Heats ===
The first round was held on August 2.

Rank	Name	Nationality	Time	Notes
1	Gustavo Borges	Brazil	1:50.99	Q
2	Scott Tucker	United States	1:51.71	Q
3	Yannick Lupien	Canada	1:51.81	Q
4	Mark Johnston	Canada	1:52.00	Q
5	Leonardo Costa	Brazil	1:52.51	Q
6	Nate Boyle	United States	1:52.66	Q
7	Joshua Ilika	Mexico	1:53.33	Q
8	Javier Díaz	Mexico	1:53.38	Q

=== B Final ===
The B final was held on August 2.

Rank	Name	Nationality	Time	Notes
9	Ives García	Cuba	1:53.14	
10	Damian Alleyne	Barbados	1:53.21	
11	Fernando Jácome	Colombia	1:53.93	
12	Francisco Páez	Venezuela	1:54.49	
13	Manuel Colmenares	Venezuela	1:54.88	
14	Sebastien Paddington	Trinidad and Tobago	1:55.05	
15	George Gleason	U.S. Virgin Islands	1:55.34	
16	Mike Fung-A-Wing	Suriname	1:56.88	

=== A Final ===
The A final was held on August 2.

Rank	Name	Nationality	Time	Notes
1st place, gold medalist(s)	Gustavo Borges	Brazil	1:49.41	
2nd place, silver medalist(s)	Scott Tucker	United States	1:50.99	
3rd place, bronze medalist(s)	Leonardo Costa	Brazil	1:51.29	
3rd place, bronze medalist(s)	Mark Johnston	Canada	1:51.29	
5	Nate Boyle	United States	1:52.83	
6	Yannick Lupien	Canada	1:52.92	
7	Joshua Ilika	Mexico	1:53.73	
8	Javier Díaz	Mexico	1:54.01	
