= Swimming at the 1999 Pan American Games – Men's 4 × 100 metre medley relay =

Men's 4 × 100 metre medley relay at the 1999 Pan American Games
- Venue: Pan Am Pool
- Dates: August 7 (preliminaries and finals)
- Competitors: from - nations

Medalists
| Gold medal | Alexandre Massura, Marcelo Tomazini, Fernando Scherer and Gustavo Borges | Brazil |
| Silver medal | Matt Allen, Ed Moses, Jarod Schroeder and Scott Tucker | United States |
| Bronze medal | Mark Versfeld, Morgan Knabe, Shamek Pietucha and Yannick Lupien | Canada |

The men's 4 × 100 metre medley relay competition of the swimming events at the 1999 Pan American Games took place on August 7 at the Pan Am Pool. The last Pan American Games champion was the United States.

== Results ==
All times are in minutes and seconds.

| KEY: | q | Fastest non-qualifiers | Q | Qualified | GR | Games record | NR | National record | PB | Personal best | SB | Seasonal best |

=== Final ===
The final was held on August 7.

| Rank | Name | Nationality | Time | Notes |
|---|---|---|---|---|
| 1st place, gold medalist(s) | Alexandre Massura; Marcelo Tomazini; Fernando Scherer; Gustavo Borges | Brazil | 3:40.27 | GR, SA |
| 2nd place, silver medalist(s) | Matt Allen; Ed Moses; Jarod Schroeder; Scott Tucker | United States | 3:40.57 | |
| 3rd place, bronze medalist(s) | Mark Versfeld; Morgan Knabe; Shamek Pietucha; Yannick Lupien | Canada | 3:41.04 | |
| 4 | - - - - | Cuba | 3:44.02 | |
| 5 | - - - - | Mexico | 3:51.45 | |
| 6 | - - - - | Ecuador | 3:54.56 | |
| 7 | - - - - | Bahamas | 3:58.37 | |
| 8 | - - - - | Peru | 4:02.27 | |
