= Swimming at the 1999 Pan American Games – Women's 200 metre freestyle =

Women's 200 metre freestyle at the 1999 Pan American Games
- Venue: Pan Am Pool
- Dates: August 3 (preliminaries and finals)
- Competitors: from - nations

Medalists
Gold medal	Jessica Deglau	Canada
Silver medal	Janelle Atkinson	Jamaica
Bronze medal	Talor Bendel	United States

The women's 200 metre freestyle swimming competition at the 1999 Pan American Games took place on 3 August 1999 at the Pan Am Pool in Winnipeg, Manitoba. The last Pan American Games champion was Cristina Teuscher of US.

This race consisted of four lengths of the pool, all in freestyle.

== Results ==
All times are in minutes and seconds.

KEY:	q	Fastest non-qualifiers	Q	Qualified	GR	Games record	NR	National record	PB	Personal best	SB	Seasonal best

=== Heats ===
The first round was held on August 3.

Rank	Name	Nationality	Time	Notes
1	Janelle Atkinson	Jamaica	2:01.94	Q
2	-	-	-	Q
3	Julia Stowers	United States	2:03.14	Q
4	Talor Bendel	United States	2:04.44	Q
5	-	-	-	Q
6	-	-	-	Q
7	-	-	-	Q
8	-	-	-	Q

=== B Final ===
The B final was held on August 3.

Rank	Name	Nationality	Time	Notes
9	Michelle Diago	Puerto Rico	2:08.60	
10	S.Mojica	Puerto Rico	2:09.57	
11	Angela Chuck	Jamaica	2:11.74	
12	Pamela Vásquez	Honduras	2:16.85	

=== A Final ===
The A final was held on August 3.

Rank	Name	Nationality	Time	Notes
1st place, gold medalist(s)	Jessica Deglau	Canada	2:00.65	
2nd place, silver medalist(s)	Janelle Atkinson	Jamaica	2:01.11	
3rd place, bronze medalist(s)	Talor Bendel	United States	2:03.18	
4	Julia Stowers	United States	2:03.46	
5	Carolyn Adel	Suriname	2:04.20	
6	Ana Muniz	Brazil	2:06.08	
7	Nayara Ribeiro	Brazil	2:06.79	
8	Talía Barrios	Peru	2:08.91	
