= Swimming at the 1999 Pan American Games – Men's 50 metre freestyle =

Men's 50 metre freestyle at the 1999 Pan American Games
- Venue: Pan Am Pool
- Dates: August 6 (preliminaries and finals)
- Competitors: from - nations

Medalists
Gold medal	Fernando Scherer	Brazil
Silver medal	José Meolans	Argentina
Bronze medal	Marcos Hernández	Cuba

The men's 50 metre freestyle competition of the swimming events at the 1999 Pan American Games took place on 6 August at the Pan Am Pool. The last Pan American Games champion was Fernando Scherer of Brazil.

This race consisted of one length of the pool in freestyle.

== Results ==
All times are in minutes and seconds.

KEY:	q	Fastest non-qualifiers	Q	Qualified	GR	Games record	NR	National record	PB	Personal best	SB	Seasonal best

=== Heats ===
The first round was held on August 6.

Rank	Name	Nationality	Time	Notes
1	Fernando Scherer	Brazil	22.22	Q, GR
2	-	-	-	Q
3	-	-	-	Q
4	-	-	-	Q
5	-	-	-	Q
6	-	-	-	Q
7	-	-	-	Q
8	Jerrod Kappler	United States	23.24	Q
9	Yannick Lupien	Canada	23.24	
13	Matthew Busbee	United States	23.50	

=== B Final ===
The B final was held on August 6.

Rank	Name	Nationality	Time	Notes
9	Ricardo Busquets	Puerto Rico	22.76	
10	Pablo Abal	Argentina	23.29	
11	Francisco Sánchez	Venezuela	23.30	
12	Yannick Lupien	Canada	23.41	
13	Craig Hutchison	Canada	23.57	
13	Matthew Busbee	United States	23.57	
15	Francisco Páez	Venezuela	23.87	
16	Tim Moffet	Panama	24.52	

=== A Final ===
The A final was held on August 6.

Rank	Name	Nationality	Time	Notes
1st place, gold medalist(s)	Fernando Scherer	Brazil	22.24	
2nd place, silver medalist(s)	José Meolans	Argentina	22.46	
3rd place, bronze medalist(s)	Marcos Hernández	Cuba	22.79	
4	Gustavo Borges	Brazil	23.06	
5	Jerrod Kappler	United States	23.17	
6	Christopher Murray	Bahamas	23.22	
7	Allan Murray	Bahamas	23.30	
8	Felipe Delgado	Ecuador	23.37	
