= Swimming at the 1999 Pan American Games – Women's 4 × 100 metre medley relay =

Women's 4 × 100 metre medley relay at the 1999 Pan American Games
- Venue: Pan Am Pool
- Dates: August 6 (preliminaries and finals)
- Competitors: from - nations

Medalists
Gold medal	Denali Knapp, Staciana Stitts, Karen Campbell and Tammie Spatz	United States
Silver medal	Kelly Stefanyshyn, Lauren van Oosten, Jessica Deglau and Laura Nicholls	Canada
Bronze medal	Fabíola Molina, Tanya Schuh, Patrícia Comini and Tatiana Lemos	Brazil

The women's 4 × 100 metre medley relay competition of the swimming events at the 1999 Pan American Games took place on August 6 at the Pan Am Pool. The last Pan American Games champion was the United States.

== Results ==
All times are in minutes and seconds.

KEY:	q	Fastest non-qualifiers	Q	Qualified	GR	Games record	NR	National record	PB	Personal best	SB	Seasonal best

=== Final ===
The final was held on August 6.

Rank	Name	Nationality	Time	Notes
1st place, gold medalist(s)	Denali Knapp; Staciana Stitts; Karen Campbell; Tammie Spatz	United States	4:06.08	GR
2nd place, silver medalist(s)	Kelly Stefanyshyn; Lauren van Oosten; Jessica Deglau; Laura Nicholls	Canada	4:08.73	
3rd place, bronze medalist(s)	Fabíola Molina; Tanya Schuh; Patrícia Comini; Tatiana Lemos	Brazil	4:15.00	
4	- - - -	Cuba	4:24.15	
5	- - - -	-	-	
6	- - - -	-	-	
7	- - - -	-	-	
8	- - - -	-	-	
