= Swimming at the 1999 Pan American Games – Women's 4 × 100 metre freestyle relay =

Women's 4 × 100 metre freestyle relay at the 1999 Pan American Games
- Venue: Pan Am Pool
- Dates: August 4 (preliminaries and finals)
- Competitors: from - nations

Medalists
Gold medal	Jessica Deglau, Marianne Limpert, Sarah Evanetz and Laura Nicholls	Canada
Silver medal	Tammie Spatz, Courtney Shealy, Stefanie Williams and Jen Eberwien	United States
Bronze medal	Juliana Machado, Rebeca Gusmão, Flávia Delaroli and Tatiana Lemos	Brazil

The women's 4 × 100 metre freestyle relay competition of the swimming events at the 1999 Pan American Games took place on August 4 at the Pan Am Pool. The last Pan American Games champion was the United States.

This race consisted of eight lengths of the pool. Each of the four swimmers completed two lengths of the pool. The first swimmer had to touch the wall before the second could leave the starting block.

== Results ==
All times are in minutes and seconds.

KEY:	q	Fastest non-qualifiers	Q	Qualified	GR	Games record	NR	National record	PB	Personal best	SB	Seasonal best

=== Final ===
The final was held on August 4.

Rank	Name	Nationality	Time	Notes
1st place, gold medalist(s)	Jessica Deglau; Marianne Limpert; Sarah Evanetz; Laura Nicholls	Canada	3:45.07	
2nd place, silver medalist(s)	Tammie Spatz; Courtney Shealy; Stefanie Williams; Jen Eberwien	United States	3:45.72	
3rd place, bronze medalist(s)	Juliana Machado; Rebeca Gusmão; Flávia Delaroli; Tatiana Lemos	Brazil	3:50.37	
4	Tamara Swaby; Jevon Atkinson; Angela Chuck; Janelle Atkinson	Jamaica	4:04.76	
5	- - - -	-	-	
6	- - - -	-	-	
7	- - - -	-	-	
8	- - - -	-	-	
