= Swimming at the 1999 Pan American Games – Men's 200 metre breaststroke =

Men's 200 metre breaststroke at the 1999 Pan American Games
- Venue: Pan Am Pool
- Dates: August 5 (preliminaries and finals)
- Competitors: from - nations

Medalists
Gold medal	Morgan Knabe	Canada
Silver medal	Steve West	United States
Bronze medal	Mark Gangloff	United States

The men's 200 metre breaststroke competition of the swimming events at the 1999 Pan American Games took place on 5 August at the Pan Am Pool. The last Pan American Games champion was Seth Van Neerden of US.

This race consisted of four lengths of the pool, all in breaststroke.

== Results ==
All times are in minutes and seconds.

KEY:	q	Fastest non-qualifiers	Q	Qualified	GR	Games record	NR	National record	PB	Personal best	SB	Seasonal best

=== Heats ===
The first round was held on August 5.

Rank	Name	Nationality	Time	Notes
1	Morgan Knabe	Canada	2:16.85	Q
2	-	-	-	Q
3	-	-	-	Q
4	Steve West	United States	2:19.62	Q
5	-	-	-	Q
6	-	-	-	Q
7	Mark Gangloff	United States	2:20.20	Q
8	-	-	-	Q

=== B Final ===
The B final was held on August 5.

Rank	Name	Nationality	Time	Notes
9	Arsenio López	Puerto Rico	2:20.25	
10	José López	Mexico	2:22.70	
11	Sergio Ferreyra	Argentina	2:22.89	
12	Jeremy Knowles	Bahamas	2:24.19	
13	Abraham Solano	Ecuador	2:24.25	
14	Gunter Rodríguez	Cuba	2:24.86	
15	Alfredo Jacobo	Mexico	2:25.21	
16	Marcos Burgos	Chile	2:25.31	

=== A Final ===
The A final was held on August 5.

Rank	Name	Nationality	Time	Notes
1st place, gold medalist(s)	Morgan Knabe	Canada	2:14.73	GR
2nd place, silver medalist(s)	Steve West	United States	2:16.26	
3rd place, bronze medalist(s)	Mark Gangloff	United States	2:16.60	
4	Marcelo Tomazini	Brazil	2:17.04	
5	Michel Boulianne	Canada	2:17.93	
6	Mario González	Cuba	2:17.93	
7	Álvaro Fortuny	Guatemala	2:20.13	
8	Fábio Mauro Silva	Brazil	2:22.14	
