= Swimming at the 1999 Pan American Games – Women's 100 metre butterfly =

Women's 100 metre butterfly at the 1999 Pan American Games
- Venue: Pan Am Pool
- Dates: August 5 (preliminaries and finals)
- Competitors: from - nations

Medalists
Gold medal	Karen Campbell	United States
Silver medal	Jessica Deglau	Canada
Bronze medal	Karine Chevrier	Canada

The women's 100 metre butterfly competition of the swimming events at the 1999 Pan American Games took place on 5 August at the Pan Am Pool. The last Pan American Games champion was Amy Van Dyken of US.

This race consisted of two lengths of the pool, all in butterfly.

== Results ==
All times are in minutes and seconds.

KEY:	q	Fastest non-qualifiers	Q	Qualified	GR	Games record	NR	National record	PB	Personal best	SB	Seasonal best

=== Heats ===
The first round was held on August 5.

Rank	Name	Nationality	Time	Notes
1	Karen Campbell	United States	59.70	Q, GR
2	-	-	-	Q
3	-	-	-	Q
4	Sylvia Bereknyei	United States	1:02.51	Q
5	-	-	-	Q
6	-	-	-	Q
7	-	-	-	Q
8	-	-	-	Q

=== B Final ===
The B final was held on August 5.

Rank	Name	Nationality	Time	Notes
9	Monique Ferreira	Brazil	1:04.08	
10	Mariela Yepez	Ecuador	1:04.99	
11	Melissa Mata	Costa Rica	1:05.79	
12	Ana Aguilera	Argentina	1:06.02	
13	Claudia Campino	Uruguay	1:06.51	
14	L.Rivas	Paraguay	1:06.53	
15	Tamara Swaby	Jamaica	1:06.78	
16	Jeanett Yanez	Peru	1:07.35	

=== A Final ===
The A final was held on August 5.

Rank	Name	Nationality	Time	Notes
1st place, gold medalist(s)	Karen Campbell	United States	1:00.05	
2nd place, silver medalist(s)	Jessica Deglau	Canada	1:00.70	
3rd place, bronze medalist(s)	Karine Chevrier	Canada	1:01.15	
4	Sylvia Bereknyei	United States	1:01.97	
5	Siobhan Cropper	Trinidad and Tobago	1:02.76	
6	Paola López	Mexico	1:02.78	
7	María Pereyra	Argentina	1:03.35	
8	Tanya Schuh	Brazil	1:03.64	
