= Swimming at the 1999 Pan American Games – Men's 400 metre freestyle =

Men's 400 metre freestyle at the 1999 Pan American Games
- Venue: Pan Am Pool
- Dates: August 5 (preliminaries and finals)
- Competitors: from - nations

Medalists
Gold medal	Luiz Lima	Brazil
Silver medal	Austin Ramirez	United States
Bronze medal	Rick Say	Canada

The men's 400 metre freestyle competition of the swimming events at the 1999 Pan American Games took place on 5 August at the Pan Am Pool. The last Pan American Games champion was Josh Davis of US.

This race consisted of eight lengths of the pool, with all eight being in the freestyle stroke.

Luiz Lima won the gold medal, breaking a string of 11 U.S. titles in a row. Before him, only other non-American had won the race, his compatriot Tetsuo Okamoto, in the first edition of the Games in 1951.

== Results ==
All times are in minutes and seconds.

KEY:	q	Fastest non-qualifiers	Q	Qualified	GR	Games record	NR	National record	PB	Personal best	SB	Seasonal best

=== Heats ===
The first round was held on August 5.

Rank	Name	Nationality	Time	Notes
1	Rick Say	Canada	3:56.98	Q
2	Austin Ramirez	United States	3:57.02	Q
3	-	-	-	Q
4	-	-	-	Q
5	-	-	-	Q
6	-	-	-	Q
7	Nat Lewis	United States	3:59.16	Q
8	-	-	-	Q

=== B Final ===
The B final was held on August 5.

Rank	Name	Nationality	Time	Notes
9	Josh Ilika	Mexico	3:59.82	
10	Cassiano Leal	Brazil	4:00.04	
11	Giancarlo Zolezzi	Chile	4:04.11	
12	Manuel Colmenares	Venezuela	4:05.64	
13	Sebastien Paddington	Trinidad and Tobago	4:10.20	

=== A Final ===
The A final was held on August 5.

Rank	Name	Nationality	Time	Notes
1st place, gold medalist(s)	Luiz Lima	Brazil	3:52.25	SA
2nd place, silver medalist(s)	Austin Ramirez	United States	3:53.64	
3rd place, bronze medalist(s)	Rick Say	Canada	3:54.66	
4	Mark Johnston	Canada	3:56.68	
5	Alejandro Bermúdez	Colombia	3:57.77	
6	Ricardo Monasterio	Venezuela	3:58.65	
7	Damian Alleyne	Barbados	3:58.90	
8	Nat Lewis	United States	3:58.99	
