= Swimming at the 1999 Pan American Games – Men's 100 metre breaststroke =

Men's 100 metre breaststroke at the 1999 Pan American Games
- Venue: Pan Am Pool
- Dates: August 2 (preliminaries and finals)
- Competitors: from - nations

Medalists
Gold medal	Ed Moses	United States
Silver medal	Jarrod Marrs	United States
Silver medal	Morgan Knabe	Canada

The Men's 100 Metre Breaststroke competition of the swimming events at the 1999 Pan American Games took place on 2 August at the Pan Am Pool. The last Pan American Games champion was Seth Van Neerden of the U.S.

This race consisted of two lengths of the pool, both lengths being in breaststroke.

== Results ==
All times are in minutes and seconds.

KEY:	q	Fastest non-qualifiers	Q	Qualified	GR	Games record	NR	National record	PB	Personal best	SB	Seasonal best

=== Heats ===
The first round was held on August 2.

Rank	Name	Nationality	Time	Notes
1	Ed Moses	United States	1:01.26	Q, GR
2	Jarrod Marrs	United States	1:02.52	Q
3	Morgan Knabe	Canada	1:02.61	Q
4	Marcelo Tomazini	Brazil	1:04.04	Q
5	Mario González	Cuba	1:04.16	Q
6	Alfredo Jacobo	Mexico	1:04.58	Q
7	Álvaro Fortuny	Guatemala	1:04.84	Q
8	Gunter Rodríguez	Cuba	1:04.99	Q

=== B Final ===
The B final was held on August 2.

Rank	Name	Nationality	Time	Notes
9	Jason Hunter	Canada	1:04.38	
10	Iván Rodríguez	Panama	1:04.52	
11	Arsenio López	Puerto Rico	1:05.09	
12	Alan Pessotti	Brazil	1:05.34	
13	Sergio Ferreyra	Argentina	1:05.52	
14	José López	Mexico	1:06.85	
15	Abraham Solano	Ecuador	1:07.26	
16	Jeremy Knowles	Bahamas	1:07.52	

=== A Final ===
The A final was held on August 2.

Rank	Name	Nationality	Time	Notes
1st place, gold medalist(s)	Ed Moses	United States	1:00.99	GR
2nd place, silver medalist(s)	Jarrod Marrs	United States	1:02.11	
2nd place, silver medalist(s)	Morgan Knabe	Canada	1:02.11	
4	Marcelo Tomazini	Brazil	1:03.72	
5	Álvaro Fortuny	Guatemala	1:04.08	
6	Alfredo Jacobo	Mexico	1:04.59	
7	Mario González	Cuba	1:04.66	
8	Gunter Rodríguez	Cuba	1:05.18	
