= Swimming at the 1999 Pan American Games – Men's 100 metre backstroke =

Men's 100 metre backstroke at the 1999 Pan American Games
- Venue: Pan Am Pool
- Dates: August 6 (preliminaries and finals)
- Competitors: from - nations

Medalists
Gold medal	Rodolfo Falcón	Cuba
Silver medal	Alexandre Massura	Brazil
Bronze medal	Matt Allen	United States

The men's 100 metre backstroke competition of the swimming events at the 1999 Pan American Games took place on 6 August at the Pan Am Pool. The last Pan American Games champion was Jeff Rouse of US.

This race consisted of two lengths of the pool, all in backstroke.

It was the first time a non-American won this event at the Pan American Games.

== Results ==
All times are in minutes and seconds.

KEY:	q	Fastest non-qualifiers	Q	Qualified	GR	Games record	NR	National record	PB	Personal best	SB	Seasonal best

=== Heats ===
The first round was held on August 6.

Rank	Name	Nationality	Time	Notes
1	Rodolfo Falcón	Cuba	55.06	Q
2	-	-	-	Q
3	Matt Allen	United States	56.17	Q
4	-	-	-	Q
5	-	-	-	Q
6	Justin Ewers	United States	56.38	Q
7	-	-	-	Q
8	-	-	-	Q

=== B Final ===
The B final was held on August 6.

Rank	Name	Nationality	Time	Notes
9	Leonardo Costa	Brazil	56.28	
10	Nick Neckles	Barbados	58.42	
11	Diego Gallo	Uruguay	59.00	
12	Mike Fung-A-Wing	Suriname	59.50	
13	Nicholas Rees	Bahamas	1:00.22	
14	E.A. Gil	El Salvador	1:01.00	
15	Carlos Prudencio	Bolivia	1:01.97	
16	O.E. Rivas	Paraguay	1:02.69	

=== A Final ===
The A final was held on August 6.

Rank	Name	Nationality	Time	Notes
1st place, gold medalist(s)	Rodolfo Falcón	Cuba	54.93	
2nd place, silver medalist(s)	Alexandre Massura	Brazil	55.17	SA
3rd place, bronze medalist(s)	Matt Allen	United States	55.86	
4	Neisser Bent	Cuba	56.00	
5	Mark Versfeld	Canada	56.11	
6	Dustin Hersee	Canada	56.23	
7	Justin Ewers	United States	56.38	
8	Ricardo Busquets	Puerto Rico	56.68	
