= Swimming at the 1999 Pan American Games – Women's 100 metre backstroke =

Women's 100 metre backstroke at the 1999 Pan American Games
- Venue: Pan Am Pool
- Dates: August 4 (preliminaries and finals)
- Competitors: from - nations

Medalists
Gold medal	Kelly Stefanyshyn	Canada
Silver medal	Denali Knapp	United States
Bronze medal	Beth Botsford	United States

The women's 100 metre backstroke competition of the swimming events at the 1999 Pan American Games took place on 4 August at the Pan Am Pool. The last Pan American Games champion was Barbara Bedford of US.

This race consisted of two lengths of the pool, all in backstroke.

== Results ==
All times are in minutes and seconds.

KEY:	q	Fastest non-qualifiers	Q	Qualified	GR	Games record	NR	National record	PB	Personal best	SB	Seasonal best

=== Heats ===
The first round was held on August 4.

Rank	Name	Nationality	Time	Notes
1	Denali Knapp	United States	1:02.78	Q
2	-	-	-	Q
3	-	-	-	Q
4	Beth Botsford	United States	1:03.43	Q
5	-	-	-	Q
6	-	-	-	Q
7	-	-	-	Q
8	-	-	-	Q

=== B Final ===
The B final was held on August 4.

Rank	Name	Nationality	Time	Notes
9	Andrea Prono	Paraguay	1:09.44	
10	Valeria Silva	Peru	1:09.80	
11	Perla Martinez	Honduras	1:10.21	
12	Ashley Allaire	U.S. Virgin Islands	1:11.67	

=== A Final ===
The A final was held on August 4.

Rank	Name	Nationality	Time	Notes
1st place, gold medalist(s)	Kelly Stefanyshyn	Canada	1:02.14	
2nd place, silver medalist(s)	Denali Knapp	United States	1:02.45	
3rd place, bronze medalist(s)	Beth Botsford	United States	1:02.48	
4	Erin Gammel	Canada	1:02.91	
5	Fabíola Molina	Brazil	1:03.57	
6	Ana María González	Cuba	1:03.83	
7	Cristiane Nakama	Brazil	1:05.25	
8	Florencia Szigeti	Argentina	1:07.88	
