= Swimming at the 1999 Pan American Games – Women's 400 metre individual medley =

Women's 400 metre individual medley at the 1999 Pan American Games
- Venue: Pan Am Pool
- Dates: August 2 (preliminaries and finals)
- Competitors: from - nations

Medalists
Gold medal	Joanne Malar	Canada
Silver medal	Maggie Bowen	United States
Bronze medal	Carolyn Adel	Suriname

The women's 400 metre individual medley competition of the swimming events at the 1999 Pan American Games took place on 2 August at the Pan Am Pool. The last Pan American Games champion was Joanne Malar of Canada.

This race consisted of eight lengths of the pool. The first two lengths were swum using the butterfly stroke, the second pair with the backstroke, the third pair of lengths in breaststroke, and the final two were freestyle.

== Results ==
All times are in minutes and seconds.

KEY:	q	Fastest non-qualifiers	Q	Qualified	GR	Games record	NR	National record	PB	Personal best	SB	Seasonal best

=== Heats ===
The first round was held on August 2.

Rank	Name	Nationality	Time	Notes
1	Joanne Malar	Canada	4:44.34	Q
2	Maggie Bowen	United States	4:51.14	Q
3	Fabíola Molina	Brazil	4:54.58	Q
4	Liz Warden	Canada	4:54.68	Q
5	Shannon Cullen	United States	4:54.89	Q
6	Carolyn Adel	Suriname	4:57.74	Q
7	Georgina Bardach	Argentina	4:59.26	Q
8	Bárbara Jatobá	Brazil	5:07.32	Q

=== B Final ===
The B final was held on August 2.

Rank	Name	Nationality	Time	Notes
9	Jeanett Yanez	Peru	5:19.90	

=== A Final ===
The A final was held on August 2.

Rank	Name	Nationality	Time	Notes
1st place, gold medalist(s)	Joanne Malar	Canada	4:38.46	GR
2nd place, silver medalist(s)	Maggie Bowen	United States	4:49.22	
3rd place, bronze medalist(s)	Carolyn Adel	Suriname	4:50.41	
4	Fabíola Molina	Brazil	4:54.38	
5	Shannon Cullen	United States	4:54.68	
6	Liz Warden	Canada	4:54.83	
7	Georgina Bardach	Argentina	4:55.94	
8	Bárbara Jatobá	Brazil	5:07.02	
