= Swimming at the 1999 Pan American Games – Women's 200 metre individual medley =

Women's 200 metre individual medley at the 1999 Pan American Games
- Venue: Pan Am Pool
- Dates: August 6 (preliminaries and finals)
- Competitors: from - nations

Medalists
Gold medal	Joanne Malar	Canada
Silver medal	Maggie Bowen	United States
Bronze medal	Marianne Limpert	Canada

The women's 200-metre individual medley competition of the swimming events at the 1999 Pan American Games was held on 6 August at the Pan Am Pool. The last Pan American Games champion was Joanne Malar of Canada.

This race consisted of four lengths of the pool, one length each swum in backstroke, breaststroke, butterfly and freestyle swimming.

== Results ==
All times are in minutes and seconds.

KEY:	q	Fastest non-qualifiers	Q	Qualified	GR	Games record	NR	National record	PB	Personal best	SB	Seasonal best

=== Heats ===
The first round was held on August 6.

Rank	Name	Nationality	Time	Notes
1	Joanne Malar	Canada	2:14.81	Q, GR
2	-	-	-	Q
3	Maggie Bowen	United States	2:18.86	Q
4	Gabrielle Rose	United States	2:19.02	Q
5	-	-	-	Q
6	-	-	-	Q
7	-	-	-	Q
8	-	-	-	Q

=== B Final ===
The B final was held on August 6.

Rank	Name	Nationality	Time	Notes
9	Bárbara Jatobá	Brazil	2:28.33	
10	Jeanett Yanez	Peru	2:31.66	
11	R.Encina	Paraguay	2:34.12	
12	Ashley Allaire	U.S. Virgin Islands	2:39.19	

=== A Final ===
The A final was held on August 6.

Rank	Name	Nationality	Time	Notes
1st place, gold medalist(s)	Joanne Malar	Canada	2:14.18	GR
2nd place, silver medalist(s)	Maggie Bowen	United States	2:15.26	
3rd place, bronze medalist(s)	Marianne Limpert	Canada	2:15.80	
4	Gabrielle Rose	United States	2:16.06	
5	Carolyn Adel	Suriname	2:18.08	
6	Fabíola Molina	Brazil	2:20.07	
7	Sylvia Álvarez	Puerto Rico	2:27.13	
8	Georgina Bardach	Argentina	2:28.15	
