= Swimming at the 1999 Pan American Games – Women's 4 × 200 metre freestyle relay =

Women's 4 × 200 metre freestyle relay at the 1999 Pan American Games
- Venue: Pan Am Pool
- Dates: August 2 (preliminaries and finals)
- Competitors: from - nations

Medalists
| Gold medal | Jessica Deglau, Joanne Malar, Marianne Limpert and Laura Nicholls | Canada |
| Silver medal | Caroline Geehr, Julia Stowers, Megan Melgaard and Talor Bendel | United States |
| Bronze medal | Monique Ferreira, Nayara Ribeiro, Tatiana Lemos and Ana Muniz | Brazil |

The women's 4 × 200 metre freestyle relay competition of the swimming events at the 1999 Pan American Games took place on August 2 at the Pan Am Pool. The last Pan American Games champion was the United States.

This race consisted of sixteen lengths of the pool. Each of the four swimmers completed four lengths of the pool. The first swimmer had to touch the wall before the second could leave the starting block.

== Results ==
All times are in minutes and seconds.

| KEY: | q | Fastest non-qualifiers | Q | Qualified | GR | Games record | NR | National record | PB | Personal best | SB | Seasonal best |

=== Final ===
The final was held on August 2.

| Rank | Name | Nationality | Time | Notes |
|---|---|---|---|---|
| 1st place, gold medalist(s) | Jessica Deglau; Joanne Malar; Marianne Limpert; Laura Nicholls | Canada | 8:05.56 | |
| 2nd place, silver medalist(s) | Caroline Geehr; Julia Stowers; Megan Melgaard; Talor Bendel | United States | 8:07.18 | |
| 3rd place, bronze medalist(s) | Monique Ferreira; Nayara Ribeiro; Tatiana Lemos; Ana Muniz | Brazil | 8:25.07 | |
| 4 | - - - - | Puerto Rico | 8:45.00 | |
| 5 | - - - - | - | - | |
| 6 | - - - - | - | - | |
| 7 | - - - - | - | - | |
| 8 | - - - - | - | - | |
