= Swimming at the 1999 Pan American Games – Women's 200 metre backstroke =

Women's 200 metre backstroke at the 1999 Pan American Games
- Venue: Pan Am Pool
- Dates: August 7 (preliminaries and finals)
- Competitors: from - nations

Medalists
Gold medal	Denali Knapp	United States
Silver medal	Beth Botsford	United States
Bronze medal	Kelly Stefanyshyn	Canada

The women's 200 metre backstroke competition of the swimming events at the 1999 Pan American Games took place on 7 August at the Pan Am Pool. The last Pan American Games champion was Barbara Bedford of US.

This race consisted of four lengths of the pool, all in backstroke.

== Results ==
All times are in minutes and seconds.

KEY:	q	Fastest non-qualifiers	Q	Qualified	GR	Games record	NR	National record	PB	Personal best	SB	Seasonal best

=== Heats ===
The first round was held on August 7.

Rank	Name	Nationality	Time	Notes
1	Beth Botsford	United States	2:15.15	Q
2	-	-	-	Q
3	-	-	-	Q
4	Denali Knapp	United States	2:19.21	Q
5	-	-	-	Q
6	-	-	-	Q
7	-	-	-	Q
8	-	-	-	Q

=== B Final ===
The B final was held on August 7.

Rank	Name	Nationality	Time	Notes
9	L.R.Cardozo	Paraguay	2:35.77	

=== A Final ===
The A final was held on August 7.

Rank	Name	Nationality	Time	Notes
1st place, gold medalist(s)	Denali Knapp	United States	2:12.48	GR
2nd place, silver medalist(s)	Beth Botsford	United States	2:12.95	
3rd place, bronze medalist(s)	Kelly Stefanyshyn	Canada	2:13.24	
4	Ana María González	Cuba	2:16.70	
5	Erin Gammel	Canada	2:17.50	
6	Fabíola Molina	Brazil	2:18.12	
7	Cristiane Nakama	Brazil	2:21.21	
8	Georgina Bardach	Argentina	2:26.55	
