= Equestrian events at the 1999 Pan American Games =

Equestrian competitions were contested by participating nations at the 1999 Pan American Games in Winnipeg, Manitoba, Canada.

== Medal summary ==
=== Medal table ===
* Host nation (Canada)

Rank	Nation	Gold	Silver	Bronze	Total
1	United States	3	3	1	7
2	Canada*	1	1	2	4
3	Brazil	1	1	1	3
4	Bermuda	1	0	0	1
5	Colombia	0	1	0	1
6	Mexico	0	0	2	2
Totals (6 entries)		6	6	6	18

== Medalists ==
Event	Gold	Silver	Bronze
Individual dressage	Debbie McDonald; United States	Shannon Oldham-Duek; Canada	Bernadette Pujals; Mexico
Team dressage	United States	Colombia	Mexico
Individual jumping	Ian Millar; Canada	Peter Wylde; United States	Vitor Alves Teixeira; Brazil
Team jumping	Brazil on Fedor	United States	Canada
Individual Three-Day	Mary Jane Tumbridge; Bermuda	David O'Connor; United States	Abigail Lufkin; United States
Team Three-Day	United States	Brazil	Canada

== See also ==
- Equestrian events at the 2000 Summer Olympics
