= Swimming at the 1999 Pan American Games – Men's 1500 metre freestyle =

Men's 1500 metre freestyle at the 1999 Pan American Games
- Venue: Pan Am Pool
- Dates: August 6 (preliminaries) and 7 (finals)
- Competitors: from - nations

Medalists
Gold medal	Tim Siciliano	United States
Silver medal	Luiz Lima	Brazil
Bronze medal	Ricardo Monasterio	Venezuela

The men's 1500 metre freestyle competition of the swimming events at the 1999 Pan American Games took place on 6 August (preliminaries) and 7 August (finals) at the Pan Am Pool. The last Pan American Games champion was Carlton Bruner of US.

This race consisted of thirty lengths of the pool, all lengths being in freestyle.

== Results ==
All times are in minutes and seconds.

KEY:	q	Fastest non-qualifiers	Q	Qualified	GR	Games record	NR	National record	PB	Personal best	SB	Seasonal best

=== Heats ===
The first round was held on August 6.

Rank	Name	Nationality	Time	Notes
1	Tim Siciliano	United States	15:36.52	Q
2	-	-	-	Q
3	-	-	-	Q
4	-	-	-	Q
5	Nat Lewis	United States	15:55.17	Q
6	-	-	-	Q
7	-	-	-	Q
8	-	-	-	Q

=== Final ===
The final was held on August 7.

Rank	Name	Nationality	Time	Notes
1st place, gold medalist(s)	Tim Siciliano	United States	15:14.94	
2nd place, silver medalist(s)	Luiz Lima	Brazil	15:21.92	
3rd place, bronze medalist(s)	Ricardo Monasterio	Venezuela	15:28.64	
4	Nat Lewis	United States	15:44.15	
5	Mark Johnston	Canada	15:53.07	
6	Agustín Fiorilli	Argentina	15:58.74	
7	Tim Peterson	Canada	16:01.31	
8	Ramón Valle González	Honduras	16:18.25	
