= Pete Julian =

American track and field coach (born 1971)

Personal information
- Born: May 11, 1971 (age 55)

Achievements and titles
- National finals: 1998 USA 15K; • 15km, 9th; 1999 USA Champs; • 10,000m, 5th; 2000 USA Indoors; • 3000m, 8th; 2000 USA Champs; • 10,000m, 11th; 2004 USA 15K; • 15km, 9th; 2006 USA 10-mile; • 10 miles, 5th; 2006 USA 20K; • 20km, 14th
Medal record
Men's athletics
Representing United States
Pan American Games
| Bronze medal – third place | Winnipeg 1999 | 10,000 m |

Pete Julian (born May 11, 1971) is an American track and field coach for the Nike Union Athletics Club and former assistant coach of the Nike Oregon Project. Julian was once a professional distance runner representing the United States. He competed for the Portland Pilots track and field team in the NCAA.

As an athlete for Adidas, Julian won a bronze medal in the 10,000m at the 1999 Pan American Games and was selected to represent the United States at the 1999 World Championships in Athletics in the same event, where he finished 22nd. He also competed at the 1997 and 1998 IAAF World Cross Country Championships.

Julian began his coaching career working at Metro State in 2005 before taking over the Washington State University cross country team in 2009. He later joined as an assistant coach to the Nike Oregon Project (NOP) in September, 2012. In December, 2022, Julian founded the Union Athletics Club.

== Personal life ==
Julian is a multiple-time cancer survivor, having survived stomach cancer via an experimental treatment.

== Major international competitions ==
| Year | Competition | Venue | Position | Event | Notes |
|---|---|---|---|---|---|
| 1998 | Prefontaine Classic | Eugene, Oregon | 7th | 5000 m | 13:33.02 |
| 1999 | IAAF World Championships in Athletics | Seville, Spain | 22nd | 10000 m | 29:20.31 |
| 2001 | Chicago Marathon | Chicago, Illinois | 19th | Marathon | 2:15:54 |

== National competitions ==
| Year | Competition | Venue | Position | Event | Notes |
|---|---|---|---|---|---|
| 2004 | United States Championships | Jacksonville, Florida | 9th | 15 km | 45:50 |
| 2006 | United States Championships | Louisville, Kentucky | 5th | 10 miles | 49:44 |
| 2006 | United States Championships | New Haven, Connecticut | 14th | 20 km | 62:15 |
