= David Galván =

Mexican long-distance runner

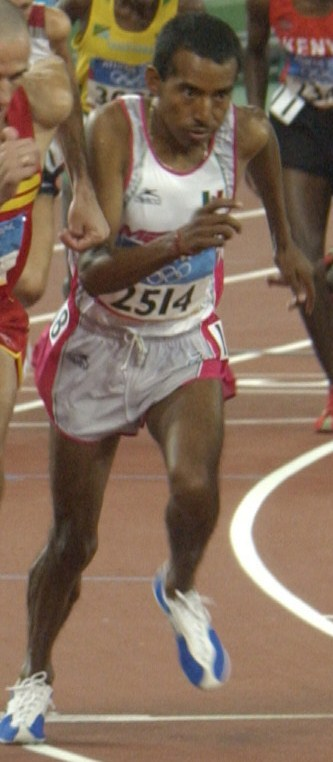
- David Galván at the 2004 Olympic Games.

Personal information
- Nickname: Keniano Mexicano
- Nationality: Mexico
- Born: 6 May 1973 (age 53) Cuatro Ciénegas, Mexico

Sport
- Sport: track and field
- Events: 5000 metres, 10000 metres
Medal record
Representing Mexico
Pan American Games
Gold medal – first place	1999 Winnipeg	5000m
Gold medal – first place	2007 Rio de Janeiro	10,000m
Silver medal – second place	1999 Winnipeg	10,000m
Silver medal – second place	2003 Santo Domingo	5000m
Central American and Caribbean Games
Gold medal – first place	2006 Cartagena	10,000m
Bronze medal – third place	2002 San Salvador	5000m

José David Galván Martínez (born 6 April 1973 in Cuatro Ciénegas, Coahuila) is a Mexican long-distance runner who specializes in the 5000 and 10,000 metres. Nicknamed Keniano Mexicano.

== Career ==
He was the winner of the inaugural North American 5K Championships, helping Mexico to the team title, and his time of 13:47 minutes went unbeaten in the competition's short history.

== Family ==
He is married to Nora Rocha.

== International competitions ==
Year	Competition	Venue	Position	Event	Notes
Representing Mexico
1999	Pan American Games	Winnipeg, Canada	1st	5000 m	13:42.04
1999	Pan American Games	Winnipeg, Canada	2nd	10,000 m	28:44.03
1999	World Championships	Seville, Spain	28th (h)	5000 m	13:54.29
2000	Olympic Games	Sydney, Australia	13th	10,000 m	27:54.56
2002	Ibero-American Championships	Guatemala City, Guatemala	3rd	3000 m	8:12.18
2002	World Cup	Madrid, Spain	2nd	3000 m	7:47.43
2002	Central American and Caribbean Games	San Salvador, El Salvador	3rd	5000 m	14:11.95
2003	World Championships	Paris, France	11th	10,000 m	27:55.31
2003	Pan American Games	Santo Domingo, Dominican Republic	2nd	5000 m	13:52.91
2004	Olympic Games	Athens, Greece	21st	10,000 m	29:38.05
2006	Central American and Caribbean Games	Cartagena, Colombia	1st	10,000 m	29:40.08
2007	Pan American Games	Rio de Janeiro, Brazil	4th	5000 m	13:38.31
2007	Pan American Games	Rio de Janeiro, Brazil	1st	10,000 m	28:08.74
2008	World Indoor Championships	Valencia, Spain	20th (h)	3000 m	8:28.29
2008	Olympic Games	Beijing, China	–	10,000 m	DNF

=== Personal bests ===
- 1500 metres - 3:39.21 min (2001)
- 3000 metres - 7:42.19 min (2000)
- 5000 metres - 13:12.18 min (2007)
- 10,000 metres - 27:33.96 min (2007)
- Half marathon - 1:03:00 hrs (2001)
