= 1999 Pan American Games medal table =

- Location: Winnipeg, Canada

Highlights
- Most gold medals: United States (106)
- Most total medals: United States (295)

The 1999 Pan American Games, officially known as the XIII Pan American Games, were a continental multi-sport event held in Winnipeg, Canada, from July 23 to August 8, 1999. At the Games, 5,000 athletes selected from 42 National Olympic Committees (NOCs) participated in events in 38 sports. Twenty-seven nations earned medals during the competition, and eighteen won at least one gold medal.

== Medal table ==
The ranking in this table is based on medal counts published by several media organizations. By default, the table is ordered by the number of gold medals won by the athletes representing a nation. (In this context, a nation is an entity represented by a NOC). The number of silver medals is taken into consideration next and then the number of bronze medals. If nations are still tied, equal ranking is given and they are listed alphabetically by IOC country code.

^{1}	Host nation

To sort this table by nation, total medal count, or any other column, click on the icon next to the column title.

Rank	Nation	Gold	Silver	Bronze	Total
1	United States	106	109	80	295
2	Cuba ^{b}	70	40	47	157
3	Canada ^{1}	64	52	80	196
4	Brazil	25	32	44	101
5	Argentina	25	19	28	72
6	Mexico	11	16	30	57
7	Colombia	7	17	18	42
8	Venezuela	7	16	17	40
9	Jamaica	3	4	6	13
10	Guatemala	2	1	1	4
11	Bahamas	2	0	1	3
12	Chile	1	4	7	12
13	Puerto Rico	1	3	8	12
14	Dominican Republic	1	3	6	10
15	Ecuador	1	2	5	8
16	Bermuda	1	2	0	3
17	Suriname	1	0	1	2
18	Netherlands Antilles	1	0	0	1
19	Peru	0	2	6	8
20	Uruguay	0	1	3	4
21	Barbados	0	1	1	2
21	Panama	0	1	1	2
23	Honduras	0	1	0	1
23	Cayman Islands	0	1	0	1
25	Costa Rica	0	0	1	1
25	El Salvador	0	0	1	1
25	Trinidad and Tobago	0	0	1	1
Total ^{c}		329/328	337/327	392/393	1,058/1,048

== Notes ==
- ^a Some sources point out that the United States earned 110 silver medals and 80 bronze medals, instead of 119 and 79, respectively. This would result in a total of 296 medals won by the nation, instead of 304.
- ^b Some sources state that Cuba earned 69 gold medals and 39 silver medals, instead of 70 and 40, respectively. This would result in the total Cuban tally of 155 medals, instead of 157.
- ^c Therefore, according to some sources, 328 gold medals, 327 silver medals and 393 bronze medals were awarded during the Games, instead of 329, 337 and 392, respectively. This would result in a total number of 1,048 medals being awarded, instead of 1,058.
