= Roller sports at the 1999 Pan American Games =

Roller skating and inline hockey were contested at the 1999 Pan American Games, held in Winnipeg, Manitoba, Canada.

== Roller skating ==
=== Men's events ===
Speed

Event	Gold	Silver	Bronze
Combined Short Distance	Diego Rosero; Colombia	Chad Hedrick; United States	Derek Downing; United States
Combined Long Distance	Chad Hedrick; United States	José Bustamante; Colombia	Derek Downing; United States
Marathon	Chad Hedrick; United States	Diego Rosero; Colombia	José Bustamante; Colombia

Artistic

Event	Gold	Silver	Bronze
Free skating	Walter Iglesias; Argentina	Eric Anderson; United States	Diego Alencar; Brazil

=== Women's events ===
Speed

Event	Gold	Silver	Bronze
Combined Short Distance	Andrea González; Argentina	Berenice Moreno; Colombia	Erika Rueda; Colombia
Combined Long Distance	Theresa Cliff; United States	Julie Brandt; United States	Andrea González; Argentina
Half Marathon	Andrea Haritchelhar; Argentina	Andrea González; Argentina	Erika Rueda; Colombia

Artistic

Event	Gold	Silver	Bronze
Free skating	Patricia Houle; United States	Florencia Sachero; Argentina	Janaína Espíndola; Brazil

=== Mixed events ===
Artistic

Event	Gold	Silver	Bronze
Dance	United States; Melissa Quinn; Adam White	Uruguay; Karina Rocha; Germán Alves	Canada; Sherri Bint; Ron Woods
Mixed doubles free skating	Argentina; Gabriela Mugica; Flavio Fissolo	United States; April Corley; Brian Richardson	Brazil; Luciana Roiha; Max Santos

== Inline hockey ==
=== Men ===
Event	Gold	Silver	Bronze
Team	United States	Argentina	Brazil

== Medal table ==
* Host nation (Canada)

Rank	Nation	Gold	Silver	Bronze	Total
1	United States	6	4	2	12
2	Argentina	4	3	1	8
3	Colombia	1	3	3	7
4	Uruguay	0	1	0	1
5	Brazil	0	0	4	4
6	Canada	0	0	1	1
Totals (6 entries)		11	11	11	33
