= Karate at the 1999 Pan American Games =

This page shows the results of the Karate Competition for men and women at the 1999 Pan American Games, held from July 23 to August 8, 1999 in Winnipeg, Manitoba, Canada.

== Men's competition ==
=== Kata ===
RANK	NAME
Gold medal	Akira Fukuda (USA)
Silver medal	Antonio Díaz (VEN)
Bronze medal	Akio Tamashiro (PER)
Bronze medal	Hector Ortiz (MEX)

=== Kumite (– 60 kg) ===
RANK	NAME
Gold medal	Yusey Padron (CUB)
Silver medal	Dov Sternberg (USA)
Bronze medal	Eduardo Noguera (VEN)
Bronze medal	Sidirley Souza (BRA)

=== Kumite (– 65 kg) ===
RANK	NAME
Gold medal	George Kotaka (USA)
Silver medal	Alberto Espejo (COL)
Bronze medal	William Preciado (ECU)
Bronze medal	Enrique Vilela (CUB)

=== Kumite (– 70 kg) ===
RANK	NAME
Gold medal	Anthony Boelbaai (AHO)
Silver medal	Jaime Noguera (VEN)
Bronze medal	Jean Carlos Peña (VEN)
Bronze medal	Célio Renê (BRA)

=== Kumite (– 75 kg) ===
RANK	NAME
Gold medal	Ricardo Pérez (VEN)
Silver medal	Antônio Pinto (BRA)
Bronze medal	Tetsuo Alonso Murayama (MEX)
Bronze medal	Massimiliano Pagano (BRA)

=== Kumite (– 80 kg) ===
RANK	NAME
Gold medal	John Fonseca (USA)
Silver medal	Nelson Sardenberg (BRA)
Bronze medal	Bravo Rodríguez (CUB)
Bronze medal	Antonio Puente Torres (MEX)

=== Kumite (+ 80 kg) ===
RANK	NAME
Gold medal	Douglas Selchan (USA)
Silver medal	Altamiro Miranda (BRA)
Bronze medal	Manuel Costa (URU)
Bronze medal	Yoel Díaz (CUB)

== Women's competition ==
=== Kata ===
RANK	NAME
Gold medal	Kellie Kennedy (USA)
Silver medal	Ulda Alarcon (MEX)
Bronze medal	Ana Martínez (VEN)
Bronze medal	Roxana Flores (PER)

=== Kumite (– 53 kg) ===
RANK	NAME
Gold medal	Beisy Quintana (CUB)
Silver medal	Gladys Eusebio (PER)
Bronze medal	Btissima Essadiqi (CAN)
Bronze medal	Christina Muccini (USA)

=== Kumite (– 60 kg) ===
RANK	NAME
Gold medal	María Wayow (VEN)
Silver medal	Maria Maia (BRA)
Bronze medal	Barbara Chinen (USA)
Bronze medal	Lisa Ling (CAN)

=== Kumite (+ 60 kg) ===
RANK	NAME
Gold medal	Lucélia Ribeiro (BRA)
Silver medal	Katty Mercedes Acevedo (DOM)
Bronze medal	Cristina Madrid (MEX)
Bronze medal	Kimberly Morgan (USA)

== Medal table ==
Place	Nation	Gold medal	Silver medal	Bronze medal	Total
1	United States	5	1	3	9
2	Venezuela	2	2	3	7
3	Cuba	2	0	3	5
4	Brazil	1	4	3	8
5	Netherlands Antilles	1	0	0	1
6	Mexico	0	1	4	5
7	Peru	0	1	2	3
8	Colombia	0	1	0	1
8	Dominican Republic	0	1	0	1
9	Canada	0	0	2	2
10	Ecuador	0	0	1	1
10	Uruguay	0	0	1	1
Total		11	11	22	44
