= Dov Sternberg =

American karateka

- Style: Karate

Dov Sternberg is an American karateka.

== Early life ==
Sternberg is from Woodmere, New York. His father, Dr. Alex Sternberg, founded the American Maccabiah Games karate team in 1977.

== Karate career ==
Sternberg began training in karate at age five. He won a gold medal in the World Junior Championships in Budapest, Hungary. In 1998, he won the gold medal in Men's Advanced Kumite −60 in the USA National Karate-do Federation national championships. He won a silver medal in the 1999 Pan American Games in the Men's Kumite Individual −60kg.

At the World Traditional Karate Organization (WTKO) 2003 North American Karate Championship, he took second place in both Men's Black Belt Individual Kumite and Men's Individual Kata. At the 2009 Maccabiah Games Sternberg won a bronze medal in the Kumite Up To 60k, as part of the Team USA Karate Team. He won a gold medal as part of Team USA in the 2013 Maccabiah Games in Team Kata.
