= Freddy González (runner) =

Venezuelan long-distance runner (born 1977)

Personal information
- Full name: Freddy González Fonten
- Born: July 10, 1977 (age 49) Cumaná, Sucre, Venezuela
- Height: 1.60 m (5 ft 3 in)
- Weight: 60 kg (132 lb)

Sport
- Country: Venezuela
- Sport: Men's Athletics

Achievements and titles
- Olympic finals: 2004 Summer Olympics
Medal record
Men's Athletics
Representing Venezuela
Bolivarian Games
Gold medal – first place	2001 Ambato	1500 m
- Updated on 27 May 2013

Freddy González Fonten (born July 10, 1977, in Cumaná, Sucre State) is a male long-distance runner from Venezuela.

== Biography ==
He represented his native country at the 2004 Summer Olympics in Athens, Greece. He set his personal best in the men's 5,000 metres (13:22.30) on July 3, 2004, in San Sebastián.

== Achievements ==
Year	Competition	Venue	Position	Event	Notes
Representing Venezuela
1998	Central American and Caribbean Games	Maracaibo, Venezuela	2nd	5000 m	14:04.77 min
1999	Pan American Games	Winnipeg, Canada	10th	5000 m	14:12.94 min
2000	Ibero-American Championships	Rio de Janeiro, Brazil	6th	5000 m	14:34.99 min
2001	Central American and Caribbean Championships	Guatemala City, Guatemala	2nd	1500 m	3:47.04 min A
2001	Central American and Caribbean Championships	Guatemala City, Guatemala	3rd	5000 m	14:25.84 min A
2001	Bolivarian Games	Ambato, Ecuador	1st	1500 m	3:56.21 min A
2002	Ibero-American Championships	Guatemala City, Guatemala	7th	3000 m	8:35.98 min
2002	Central American and Caribbean Games	San Salvador, El Salvador	2nd	5000 m	14:08.45 min
2003	Pan American Games	Santo Domingo, Dom. Rep.	6th	5000 m	14:21.53 min
2004	Ibero-American Championships	Huelva, Spain	5th	3000 m	8:00.23 min
2004	Ibero-American Championships	Huelva, Spain	2nd	5000 m	13:49.05 min
2004	Olympic Games	Athens, Greece	28th	5000 m	13:42.44 min
2006	Central American and Caribbean Games	Cartagena, Colombia	4th	5000 m	14:19.02 min
2007	ALBA Games	Caracas, Venezuela	1st	5000 m	14:06.40 min
2007	Pan American Games	Rio de Janeiro, Brazil	6th	5000 m	13:52.79 min
2007	Pan American Games	Rio de Janeiro, Brazil	8th	10,000 m	29:38.04 min
