= Athletics at the 1999 Pan American Games – Men's 10,000 metres =

Men's 10,000 metres at the Pan American Games

The men's 10,000 metres event at the 1999 Pan American Games was held on July 27.

== Results ==
Rank	Name	Nationality	Time	Notes
1st place, gold medalist(s)	Elenilson da Silva	Brazil	28:43.50	
2nd place, silver medalist(s)	David Galván	Mexico	28:44.03	
3rd place, bronze medalist(s)	Pete Julian	United States	28:44.55	
4	Silvio Guerra	Ecuador	28:47.66	
5	Meb Keflezighi	United States	28:50.22	
6	Néstor García	Uruguay	28:58.13	
7	Mauricio Díaz	Chile	29:20.56	
8	Alejandro Salvador	Mexico	30:00.87	
	Antonio Silio	Argentina	DNF	
	Sean Kaley	Canada	DNS	
	Orlando Guérrero	Colombia	DNS	
	Franklin Tenorio	Ecuador	DNS	
