= Athletics at the 1999 Pan American Games – Men's 1500 metres =

Men's 1500 metres at the Pan American Games

The men's 1500 metres event at the 1999 Pan American Games was held on July 30.

== Results ==
Rank	Name	Nationality	Time	Notes
1st place, gold medalist(s)	Graham Hood	Canada	3:41.20	
2nd place, silver medalist(s)	Michael Stember	United States	3:41.96	
3rd place, bronze medalist(s)	Hudson de Souza	Brazil	3:42.18	
4	Héctor Torres	Mexico	3:42.72	
5	Mauricio Ladino	Colombia	3:43.81	
6	Jonathon Riley	United States	3:45.37	
7	Cristián Rosales	Uruguay	3:46.92	
8	Terrance Armstrong	Bermuda	3:46.99	
9	Stephen Green	Jamaica	3:47.12	
10	Darryl Fillion	Canada	3:47.68	
11	Johnny Loria	Costa Rica	3:51.73	
	Sheldon Monderay	Trinidad and Tobago	DNS	
