= Athletics at the 1999 Pan American Games – Men's marathon =

Men's marathon at the Pan American Games

The men's marathon event at the 1999 Pan American Games was held on July 25.

== Results ==
Rank	Name	Nationality	Time	Notes
1st place, gold medalist(s)	Vanderlei de Lima	Brazil	2:17:20	
2nd place, silver medalist(s)	Rubén Maza	Venezuela	2:19:56	
3rd place, bronze medalist(s)	Éder Fialho	Brazil	2:20:09	
4	Franklin Tenorio	Ecuador	2:20:19	
5	Darrell General	United States	2:23:58	
6	Joseph McVeigh	United States	2:27:49	
7	Eddy Bathalien	Haiti	2:49:48	
	Carlos Bautista	Mexico	DNF	
	Luis Reyes	Mexico	DNF	
	Luis Alberto Ochoa	Colombia	DNF	
	Miguel Mallqui	Peru	DNS	
