= Armando Barcellos =

Brazilian triathlete (born 1966)

Armando Luís Barcellos da Silva
Personal information
- Born: February 6, 1966 (age 59); Niterói, Rio de Janeiro, Brazil

Sport
- Country: Triathlon

Armando Luís Barcellos da Silva (born February 6, 1966, in Niterói, Rio de Janeiro) is an athlete from Brazil, who competes in triathlon. Barcellos competed at the first Olympic triathlon at the 2000 Summer Olympics. He ended up in thirty-ninth place, with a total time of 1:53:42.63.
