= Athletics at the 1999 Pan American Games – Women's discus throw =

Women's discus throw at the Pan American Games

The women's discus throw event at the 1999 Pan American Games was held on July 30.

== Results ==
Rank	Name	Nationality	#1	#2	#3	#4	#5	#6	Result	Notes
1st place, gold medalist(s)	Elisângela Adriano	Brazil	59.77	x	60.92	60.64	x	x	60.92	
2nd place, silver medalist(s)	Aretha Hill	United States	x	x	56.69	x	59.06	x	59.06	
3rd place, bronze medalist(s)	Kris Kuehl	United States	54.75	55.04	54.44	57.21	56.88	x	57.21	
4	Anaelys Fernández	Cuba	52.86	54.14	x	56.32	53.54	47.86	56.32	
5	Rhonda Hackett	Trinidad and Tobago	47.47	49.95	51.42	x	x	x	51.42	
	Michelle Fournier	Canada							DNS	
