= Tennis at the 1999 Pan American Games – Women's doubles =

Women's doubles at the 1999 Pan American Games was won by Joana Cortez and Vanessa Menga of Brazil.

== Medalists ==
| Gold | (Brazil) Joana Cortez and Vanessa Menga |
| Silver | (Chile) Paula Cabezas and Bárbara Castro |
| Bronze | (Argentina) Mariana Díaz Oliva and Clarisa Fernández |
| Bronze | (Canada) Renata Kolbovic and Aneta Soukup |

== Draw ==
=== Final rounds ===
Semifinals
(Brazil) Joana Cortez / Vanessa Menga | 6 | 7
(Canada) Renata Kolbovic / Aneta Soukup | 2 | 6
(Chile) Paula Cabezas / Bárbara Castro | 6 | 6 | 3
(Argentina) Mariana Díaz Oliva / Clarisa Fernández | 7 | 3 | 2 r

Final
(Brazil) Joana Cortez / Vanessa Menga | 6 | 7
(Chile) Paula Cabezas / Bárbara Castro | 0 | 6
