= Ashley Ellis =

American ballet dancer

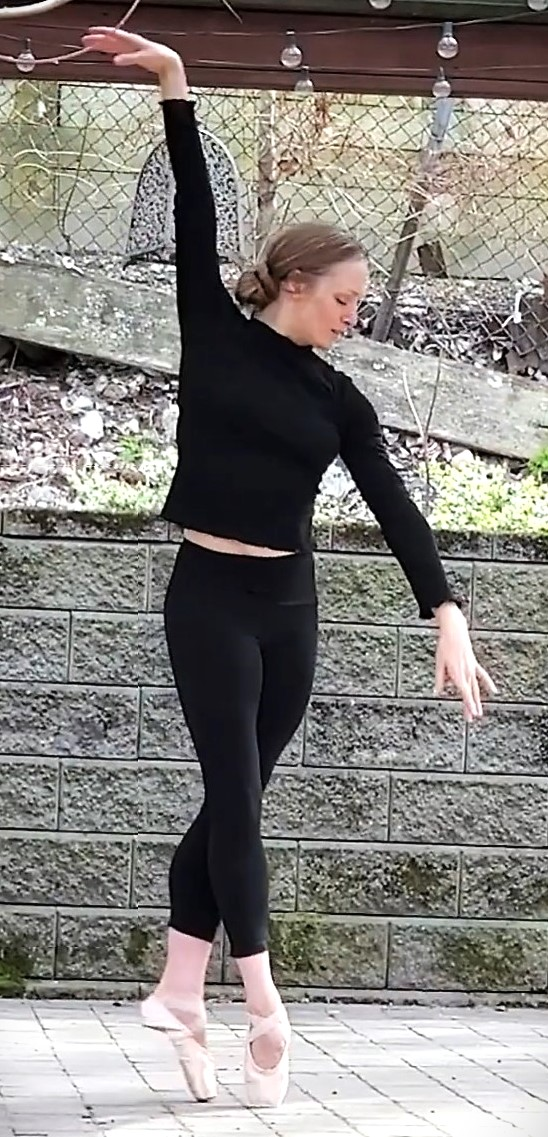
- Ellis dancing for Swans for Relief in 2020
- Born: 1983 (age 42–43)
- Occupation: Ballet dancer
- Partner: George Birkadze
- Children: 2
- Dancing career
- Current group: American Classical Ballet, American Classical Ballet Centre
- Former groups: Boston Ballet; American Ballet Theatre; Corella Ballet; Sarasota Ballet

Ashley Ellis (born August 14, 1983) is an American ballet dancer. She joined the American Ballet Theatre in 2002. She danced at Corella Ballet from 2007 to 2010 and then Sarasota Ballet for a year. In 2011, she joined the Boston Ballet, and was promoted to principal dancer in 2013. Ellis retired from performing in 2021.

== Early life and training ==
Ellis is from Torrance, California. She trained at South Bay Ballet in her hometown. She participated in the summer intensive program at the American Ballet Theatre (ABT) between 1999 and 2001.

== Career ==
In 2001, Ellis was invited to join the ABT Studio Company. The following year, she moved to the main company. Throughout her time at ABT, she was a member of the corps de ballet. In 2007, Ellis learned that ABT principal dancer Ángel Corella was going to start a company in Spain, and approached him about joining his company. She spent six months at his touring troupe before the Corella Ballet officially started. She held the position of soloist, and she danced as Odette/Odile in Swan Lake. In 2010, Ellis returned to the United States, and danced at the Sarasota Ballet as a soloist for a year.

In 2011, Ellis joined the Boston Ballet as a second soloist. In 2013, she was promoted to principal dancer. Among the ballets she danced in Boston were Swan Lake, The Sleeping Beauty, The Nutcracker and Le Corsaire, Balanchine's Serenade, Jewels, Episodes, and Coppélia, Robbins' The Concert and Fancy Free, Ashton's Cinderella, Cranko's Onegin, Landar's Études, Wheeldon's Polyphonia and McGregor's Chroma.

Outside of the Boston Ballet, in 2014, Ellis started her dancewear brand RubiaWear, which focuses on warm-up attires and accessories. She conceived the idea after her colleagues noticed her handmade leg warmers and asked her to make some for them. In 2020, when performances were canceled due to the COVID-19 pandemic, Ellis was among the 32 ballerinas that participated in Misty Copeland's "Swans for Relief" fundraiser. All of the ballerinas filmed themselves dancing Fokine's The Dying Swan to raise funds for the participating dancers' companies and the arts.

In 2021, Ellis retired from dancing. She did not have a farewell performance due to the pandemic, and she was on maternity leave after giving birth to her second child. She then became the associate director of the Dallas Conservatory's newly founded professional division, titled Classical Training Program, alongside her husband George Birkadze as the director. Ellis said the position came about when the couple were looking for opportunities in Dallas, where her parents reside. In 2025 she became Associate Director at American Classical Ballet, a Frisco based professional training program and young performing company. Ellis continues to work with dancers and run the dancewear brand, RubiaWear.

== Personal life ==
Ellis is married to dance teacher and choreographer George Birkadze. The couple met while dancing at Corella Ballet. They have two children.
