= Athletics at the 1999 Pan American Games – Men's 5000 metres =

Men's 5000 metres at the Pan American Games

The men's 5000 metres event at the 1999 Pan American Games was held on July 24.

== Results ==
Rank	Name	Nationality	Time	Notes
1st place, gold medalist(s)	David Galván	Mexico	13:42.04	
2nd place, silver medalist(s)	Elenilson da Silva	Brazil	13:43.13	
3rd place, bronze medalist(s)	Jeff Schiebler	Canada	13:43.66	
4	Brian Baker	United States	13:47.29	
5	Daniel Browne	United States	13:48.27	
6	Silvio Guerra	Ecuador	13:48.94	
7	Mauricio Díaz	Chile	13:53.55	
8	Mauricio Ladino	Colombia	13:54.15	
9	Sean Kaley	Canada	14:06.36	
10	Freddy González	Venezuela	14:12.94	
11	Néstor García	Uruguay	14:26.40	
	Pablo Olmedo	Mexico	DQ	
