= Christina Forte =

Brazilian windsurfer

Personal information
- Full name: Christina Mattoso Maia Forte
- Nationality: Brazil
- Born: 23 June 1967 (age 57)
- Height: 1.70 m (5 ft 7 in)
- Weight: 60 kg (132 lb)

Sport
- Sport: Windsurfing

Christina Mattoso Maia Forte (born 23 June 1967) is a Brazilian windsurfer. She competed in the 1992 Summer Olympics, the 1996 Summer Olympics, and the 2000 Summer Olympics.
