= Éder Fialho =

Brazilian long-distance runner

Personal information
- Born: May 4, 1973 (age 53) Rio de Janeiro, Brazil

Sport
- Sport: Track and field
Medal record
Representing Brazil
Pan American Games
Bronze medal – third place	1999 Winnipeg	Marathon

Éder Moreno Fialho (born May 4, 1973) is a marathon runner from Brazil, who represented his native country in the men's marathon at the 2000 Summer Olympics. He won the bronze medal in the same event, a year earlier at the 1999 Pan American Games. Fialho won the 1999 edition of the Beppu-Ōita Marathon in Japan.

== Achievements ==
Year	Competition	Venue	Position	Event	Notes
Representing Brazil
1997	World Championships	Athens, Greece	57th	Marathon	2:36:14
1998	Chicago Marathon	Chicago, USA	6th	Marathon	2:09:48
1999	Beppu-Ōita Marathon	Beppu-Ōita, Japan	1st	Marathon	2:09:54
1999	Pan American Games	Winnipeg, Canada	3rd	Marathon	2:20:09
2000	Olympic Games	Sydney, Australia	—	Marathon	DNF
