= Vitor Teixeira =

Brazilian equestrian

Personal information
- Born: 22 January 1958 (age 67); Belo Horizonte, Brazil

Sport
- Sport: Equestrian

Vitor Teixeira (born 22 January 1958) is a Brazilian equestrian. He competed at the 1984 Summer Olympics, the 1988 Summer Olympics and the 1992 Summer Olympics.
