= Beth Botsford =

American swimmer (born 1981)

Personal information
- Full name: Beth Anne Botsford Nickname = B.B.
- National team: United States
- Born: May 21, 1981 (age 45) Baltimore, Maryland, U.S.
- Height: 5 ft 9 in (1.75 m)
- Weight: 135 lb (61 kg)

Sport
- Sport: Swimming
- Strokes: Backstroke
- Club: North Baltimore Aquatic Club
- College team: University of Arizona
Medal record
Women's swimming
Representing the United States
Olympic Games
Gold medal – first place	1996 Atlanta	100 m backstroke
Gold medal – first place	1996 Atlanta	4x100 m medley
Pan American Games
Silver medal – second place	1999 Winnipeg	200 m backstroke
Bronze medal – third place	1999 Winnipeg	100 m backstroke
Summer Universiade
Silver medal – second place	2003 Daegu	50 m backstroke
Silver medal – second place	2003 Daegu	4x100 m medley

Beth Anne Botsford (born May 21, 1981) is an American former competition swimmer and backstroke specialist who won two gold medals as a fifteen-year-old at the 1996 Summer Olympics in Atlanta, Georgia. She did so in the individual 100-meter backstroke, and as a member of the women's relay team in 4×100-meter medley.

== Personal ==
Botsford grew up in Timonium, Maryland. She started her swimming journey at the age of 9 for the North Baltimore Aquatic Club in Baltimore, Maryland. Over the next 5 years, Beth held every national age group record in the backstroke events for the ages 9–10 year olds, 11-12 year olds, and 13-14 year olds.

In 1996 at the age of 14, and already with 2 National Championships under her belt, Beth placed first in the 200m backstroke at the US Olympic Trials and second in the 100m backstroke, earning her a spot as one of the youngest members on the United States Olympic Team. That summer in Atlanta, Georgia, Beth swam to a gold medal finish in the 100m Backstroke at the XXVI Olympic Games and swam the backstroke leg of the gold medal winning 4 × 100 m Medley Relay.

Throughout the next ten years, Beth won a total 6 National Championships, broke the American and US Open records in the 200m Backstroke, was an NCAA Champion and 16 time All-American for the University of Arizona, was voted the PAC-10 Newcomer of the Year, received the Ruby Award for "Outstanding Female Student Athlete" at the University of Arizona, has served as the honorary head coach for the Special Olympics of Maryland, and has been inducted into the Maryland Swimming Hall of Fame and the University of Arizona Sports Hall of Fame.

She has traveled all around the world including Paris, Japan, Korea, Paris, Barbados, Mexico, Canada, and Australia representing the United States as gold, silver and bronze medals earning member of the Pan American Games Team, Pan Pacific Games Team, World Championships Team and the World University Games Team (which she was also voted team captain for the USA). Beth has been requested anywhere from Alaska to Virginia to Japan for her Stroke Clinics.

Beth was the owner of the Golden Guppies Swim School in Madison, Wisconsin, and coached the Waunakee Wave Swim Team.

In 2017, Beth Botsford returned to the college where she was inducted into the Hall of Fame, the University of Arizona, this time however, as a coach. Beth was an assistant coach under new head coach Augie Busch (son of Frank Busch) for Arizona, adding to the deep-rooted Arizona coaching staff, including another former swimmer for the Wildcats, NCAA champion Cory Chitwood.

== See also ==
- List of Olympic medalists in swimming (women)
- List of University of Arizona people
