= Fernando Jácome =

Colombian swimmer (born 1980)

Personal information
- Born: January 25, 1980 (age 46)

Sport
- Sport: Swimming
Medal record
Representing Colombia
Central American and Caribbean Games
Gold medal – first place	1998 Maracaibo	200m freestyle

Fernando José Jácome Clavijo (born January 25, 1980) is a freestyle swimmer from Colombia. He competed at the 2000 Summer Olympics in Sydney, Australia for his native country. There he ended up in 47th place in the Men's 100m Freestyle, clocking 52.24 in the preliminary heats, and in 34th place (1:54.17) in the Men's 200m Freestyle.
