= Nayara Ribeiro =

Brazilian swimmer (born 1984)

Personal information
- Full name: Nayara Ledoux Ribeiro
- Nationality: Brazil
- Born: June 27, 1984 (age 42) Vitória da Conquista, Bahia, Brazil
- Height: 1.55 m (5 ft 1 in)
- Weight: 49 kg (108 lb)

Sport
- Sport: Swimming
- Strokes: Freestyle
Medal record
Women's swimming
Representing Brazil
Pan American Games
Bronze medal – third place	1999 Winnipeg	4×200 m freestyle
South American Games
Silver medal – second place	2006 Buenos Aires	4×200 m freestyle

Nayara Ledoux Ribeiro (born June 27, 1984 in Vitória da Conquista) is a freestyle swimmer from Brazil.

== Early years ==
As a child, Nayara wanted to be a ballerina. But at eight years old, her fragile health, and a pharyngitis not healed, led her to the pools. The athlete only defined to have a professional swimmer career at age 14, when she broke a legendary record: at Juvenile South American Championships, in Vitória, Espírito Santo, she broke the South American record of the 400-metre freestyle, which lasted since 1988, with a time of 4:19.32. The owner of the previous record was Patrícia Amorim, who, at the 1988 Summer Olympics marked 4:19.64.

== International career ==
At just 15 years old, participating at the 1999 Pan American Games in Winnipeg, she won a bronze medal in the 4×200-metre freestyle. She also finished 6th in the 400-metre freestyle, and 7th in the 200 and 800-metre freestyle.

On June 5, 2000, she broke the South American Record of the 800-metre freestyle, with a time of 8:46.55. On November 16, 2000, she broke the short-course South American record of the same race, doing 8:33.69. This record was only broken by Kobrich on 2004, but still was a Brazilian record until 2010, when Poliana Okimoto broke the record.

Participating in the 2001 World Aquatics Championships in Fukuoka, Nayara, 17 years old, managed to get to the 1500-metre freestyle final, finishing in 8th place. She was the first Brazilian woman to qualify for a World Championship final, where she finished the race in 16:40.37. On July 27, during qualifying, she broke the Brazilian and South American records in the 1500-metre freestyle, with a time of 16:32.18. This South American record was not broken until 2013, when Poliana Okimoto made a time of 16:26.90. At this competition, she also finished 13th in the 800-metre freestyle, with a time of 8:43.85, South American record.

At the 2002 FINA World Swimming Championships (25 m), in Moscow, Nayara finished 14th in the 800-metre freestyle, and 20th in the 400-metre freestyle.

On May 3, 2002, Nayara broke the South American record of the 1500-metre freestyle (in short course), with a time of 16:13.64. This was the Brazilian record until September 25, 2010, when Poliana Okimoto scored 16:09.04 time.

At the 2002 Pan Pacific Swimming Championships in Yokohama, Nayara did a great tournament, finishing 4th in the 1500-metre freestyle, 5th in the 4×200-metre freestyle, and 6th in the 800-metre freestyle. In Yokohama, she broke the South American Record of the 800-metre freestyle, with a time of 8:43.53, and also broke the 4×200-metre freestyle record, with a time of 8:15.80.

She participated at the 2003 World Aquatics Championships, in Barcelona, where she finished 26th in the 800-metre freestyle.

Nayara was at the 2003 Pan American Games in Santo Domingo, where she finished 5th in the 800-metre freestyle.

At the 2006 South American Games in Buenos Aires, Nayara won the silver medal in the 4×200-metre freestyle. She also had won bronze in the 1500-metre freestyle, but was disqualified after the race, losing this medal.

Nayara was at the 2007 Pan American Games in Rio de Janeiro, where she finished 10th in the 800-metre freestyle.

== After professional swimming ==
On 2008 she was attending Law School at FTC (Faculty of Science and Technology). Her idol is Ayrton Senna.

In December 2012, she married with Adriano de Souza Valente (a former breaststroke swimmer, now entrepreneur), in Salvador, Bahia.

== Personal bests ==
Nayara Ribeiro is the current holder, or former holder, of the following records:

Long Course (50 meters):

- Former South American record holder of the 400m freestyle: 4:19.32, time obtained on 1998
- Former South American record holder of the 800m freestyle: 8:43.53, time obtained on August 22, 2002
- Former South American record holder of the 1500m freestyle: 16:32.18, time obtained on July 27, 2001
- Former South American record holder of the 4x200m freestyle: 8:15.80, time obtained on August 28, 2002, along with Monique Ferreira, Mariana Brochado and Denise Oliveira

Short course (25 meters):

- Former South American record holder of the 800m freestyle: 8:33.69, time obtained on November 16, 2000
- Former South American record holder of the 1500m freestyle: 16:13.64, time obtained on May 3, 2002
