= Francisco Páez (swimmer) =

Venezuelan swimmer (born 1979)

Personal information
- Full name: Francisco José Páez Kuper
- Nickname: Pancho
- Nationality: Venezuela
- Born: 17 April 1979 (age 47) Valencia, Venezuela
- Height: 1.85

Sport
- Sport: Swimming
- Strokes: Freestyle, butterfly
- College team: LSU
Medal record
Representing Venezuela
Central American and Caribbean Games
4x100m freestyle relay

Francisco José Páez Kuper (born 17 April 1979) is an Olympic swimmer from Venezuela. He swam for Venezuela at the 2000 Olympics. He also represented Venezuela at the 1999 Pan Am Games and the 1998 Central American & Caribbean Games
