= Patrícia Comini =

Brazilian swimmer (born 1975)

Personal information
- Full name: Patrícia Comini-Ribeiro da Silva
- Nationality: Brazil
- Born: March 8, 1975 (age 51) Americana, São Paulo, Brazil
- Height: 1.78 m (5 ft 10 in)
- Weight: 68 kg (150 lb)

Sport
- Sport: Swimming
- Strokes: Breaststroke, butterfly
Medal record
Women's swimming
Representing Brazil
Pan American Games
Bronze medal – third place	1995 Mar del Plata	4x100 m medley
Bronze medal – third place	1999 Winnipeg	4x100 m medley

Patrícia Comini-Ribeiro da Silva (born March 8, 1975, in Americana) is a former breaststroke and butterfly swimmer from Brazil.

== International career ==
At the 1995 Pan American Games in Mar del Plata, Comini won a bronze medal in the 4×100-metre medley. She also finished 4th in the 200-metre butterfly, and 8th in the 100-metre butterfly.

On December 20, 1998, she broke the short-course Brazilian record in the 100-metre breaststroke, with a time of 1:10.59.

At the 1999 Pan American Games in Winnipeg, Comini won a bronze medal in the 4×100-metre medley. She also finished 5th in the 200-metre butterfly, 6th in the 100-metre breaststroke, and 7th in the 200-metre breaststroke.

On November 21, 1999, she broke the short-course South American record in the 50-metre breaststroke, with a time of 32.36 seconds.

On December 17, 1999, she broke the long-course South American record in the 50-metre breaststroke, with a time of 32.96 seconds.

On June 11, 2000, she broke the long-course Brazilian record in the 100-metre breaststroke, with a time of 1:12.47.

Participating in the 2003 World Aquatics Championships, in Barcelona, she finished 14th in the 4×100-metre medley, 38th in the 50-metre breaststroke, and 42nd in the 100-metre breaststroke.

At the 2003 Pan American Games in Santo Domingo, Dominican Republic, Comini finished 4th in the 4×100-metre medley, 8th in the 100-metre breaststroke, and 10th in the 200-metre breaststroke.

She retired from professional swimming in 2005.

== Personal bests ==
Patrícia Comini is the former holder of the following records:

Long Course (50 meters):

- Former South American record holder of the 50 m breaststroke: 32.96, time obtained on December 17, 1999
- Former Brazilian record holder of the 100 m breaststroke: 1:12.47 time obtained on June 11, 2000

Short course (25 meters):

- Former South American record holder of the 50 m breaststroke: 32.36, time obtained on November 21, 1999
- Former Brazilian record holder of the 100 m breaststroke: 1:10.59, time obtained on December 20, 1998
