= Alexandre Massura =

Brazilian swimmer (born 1975)

Personal information
- Full name: Alexandre Massura Neto
- Nationality: Brazil
- Born: 19 June 1975 (age 51) São Bernardo do Campo, São Paulo, Brazil
- Height: 1.90 m (6 ft 3 in)
- Weight: 88 kg (194 lb)

Sport
- Sport: Swimming
- Strokes: Backstroke
Medal record
Men's swimming
Representing Brazil
World Championships (SC)
Gold medal – first place	1995 Rio de Janeiro	4x100 m freestyle
Pan American Games
Gold medal – first place	1999 Winnipeg	4x100m Medley
Silver medal – second place	1999 Winnipeg	100m Backstroke

Alexandre Massura Neto (born 19 June 1975) is a retired male freestyle and backstroke swimmer from Brazil, who competed at two consecutive Summer Olympics for his native country, starting in 1996. Actually a resident of Minneapolis, Minnesota.

At the 1995 FINA World Swimming Championships (25 m) held in Rio de Janeiro, Massura won the gold medal in the 4×100-metre freestyle, along with Gustavo Borges, Fernando Scherer and André Cordeiro, with a time of 3m12s42. He also swam the 200-metre backstroke.

At the 1996 Summer Olympics in Atlanta, Massura came close to winning a medal, reaching the 4×100-metre freestyle final, and staying in 4th place.

The end of 1998 was marked by the third consecutive world record broke by Brazilian relay in the 4×100-metre freestyle, on short course. On 20 December, shortly after the end of Jose Finkel Trophy, the quartet formed by Fernando Scherer, Carlos Jayme, Alexandre Massura and Gustavo Borges, in order, fell the pool at Club de Regatas Vasco da Gama and they got the 3:10.45 time, that would only be broken in the year 2000 by the team of Sweden.

At the 1999 FINA World Swimming Championships (25 m), in Hong Kong, Massura reached the final of the 100-metre backstroke, finishing in 5th place.

Massura was in the 1999 Pan American Games in Winnipeg. In the 4×100-metre medley, along with Gustavo Borges, Fernando Scherer and Marcelo Tomazini, Brazil won the medley relay for the first time in the Pan's history, with a time of 3:40.27, breaking Pan American and South American records, and secure a place in the 2000 Summer Olympics. Massura also won the silver medal in the 100-metre backstroke, beating the South American record with a time of 55.17 seconds. The 4×100-metre medley record just fell in 2006, and the 100-metre backstroke record only dropped with Thiago Pereira's bronze at 2007 Pan, in Rio de Janeiro.

On 16 December 1999, Massura broke the South American record in the 50-metre backstroke Olympic pool, with a time of 26.00 seconds. The record was only broken in 2007.

At the 2000 Summer Olympics in Sydney, Massura ranked 13th in the 100-metre backstroke, and 12th in the 4×100-metre medley.

On 12 November 2000, Massura broke the South American record in the short-course 50-metre backstroke: 24.73 seconds. The record stood until 2007. In 2000, also broke the South American record in the 100-metre backstroke short course, with a time of 52.24 seconds, time that lasted until 2008.

At the 2001 World Aquatics Championships in Fukuoka, he reached the semifinals of the 50-metre and 100-metre backstroke.

Massura retired from professional swimming in 2004. Later, he worked in the Department of Sports of the Government of Minas Gerais.

== See also ==
- South American records in swimming
- List of world records in swimming
