= André Cordeiro (swimmer) =

Brazilian swimmer (born 1974)

Personal information
- Nationality: Brazil
- Born: 15 March 1974 (age 52) Belo Horizonte, Minas Gerais, Brazil
- Height: 1.93 m (6 ft 4 in)
- Weight: 85 kg (187 lb)

Sport
- Sport: Swimming
- Strokes: Freestyle
Medal record
Men's swimming
Representing Brazil
World Championships (SC)
Gold medal – first place	1995 Rio de Janeiro	4×100 m freestyle
Pan American Games
Gold medal – first place	1999 Winnipeg	4×100 m freestyle
Silver medal – second place	1999 Winnipeg	4×200 m freestyle

André Cordeiro (born 15 March 1974) is a retired freestyle swimmer from Brazil. He competed for his native country at the 1996 Summer Olympics in Atlanta, United States.

Participating in the 1995 FINA World Swimming Championships (25 m) held in Rio de Janeiro, Cordeiro won the gold medal in the 4×100-metre freestyle, along with Gustavo Borges, Fernando Scherer and Alexandre Massura, with 3m12s42 time.

In the 1996 Summer Olympics in Atlanta, Cordeiro qualified to the 4×100-metre freestyle final, finishing 4th.

He was at the 1999 FINA World Swimming Championships (25 m) in Hong Kong, swimming the 200-metre freestyle proof.

André was in 1999 Pan American Games in Winnipeg, where he earned a gold medal in the 4×100-metre freestyle, and a silver medal in the 4×200-metre freestyle. In the 4×100-metre freestyle, Cordeiro broke the South American record, with a time of 3:17.18, along with Gustavo Borges, Fernando Scherer and César Quintaes. In the 4×200-metre freestyle, he broke the South American record, with a time of 7:22.92, along with Gustavo Borges, Rodrigo Castro and Leonardo Costa.

In the 2002 FINA World Swimming Championships (25 m) in Moscow, Cordeiro reached the 4×200-metre freestyle final, finishing in 4th place, and was also in the 4×100-metre freestyle final, finishing in 5th place.

He swam at the 2002 Pan Pacific Swimming Championships, where he finished 4th in the 4×100-metre freestyle, 5th in the 4×200-metre freestyle, 5th in the 4×100-metre medley, 13th in the 100-metre freestyle, and 15th in the 50-metre freestyle.

After retiring from professional swimming, became coach of Minas Tênis Clube. He was part of the technical commission of the Brazilian team at the Junior World Championships in Monterrey-2008.
