= Marcelo Tomazini =

Brazilian swimmer

Personal information
- Full name: Marcelo Augusto Tomazini
- Nationality: Brazil
- Born: December 18, 1978 (age 47) São Paulo, São Paulo, Brazil

Sport
- Sport: Swimming
- Strokes: Breaststroke
Medal record
Men's swimming
Pan American Games
Gold medal – first place	1999 Winnipeg	4×100 m medley
Bronze medal – third place	2003 Santo Domingo	200 m breast

Marcelo Augusto Tomazini (born December 18, 1978, in São Paulo) is a male breaststroke swimmer from Brazil.

At the 1999 Pan American Games in Winnipeg, Manitoba, Canada, Tomazini teamed with Alexandre Massura, Fernando Scherer, and Gustavo Borges to compete in the 4×100 meter medley. The team's 3:40.27 time won a gold medal, and broke the South American record. When Tomazini competed in the 200-metre breaststroke, his time of 2:17.04 did not win a medal (finished 4th), but broke the South American record. In the 100-metre breaststroke, Tomazini also finished 4th, with a time of 1:3.72s.

Tomazini competed in the 1999 FINA 25 meter World Swimming Championships.

In July 2001, Tomazini broke the short-course South American record in the 50-metre breaststroke, with a time of 27.67 seconds, and in the 100-metre breaststroke, doing 1:00.23. On November 17, 2001, he broke the short-course South American record in the 200 meter breaststroke, with a time of 2:10.79.

On March 17, 2002, Tomazini again broke the South American record in the 200-metre breaststroke (Olympic pool), with a time of 2:16.21.

At the 2002 FINA 25 meter World Swimming Championships in Moscow, Russia, Tomazini qualified (but did not swim) in the 50-metre breaststroke semi-finals; finished 18th in the 100-metre breaststroke; and finished 11th in the 200-metre breaststroke. Tomazini also competed on the Brazilian's 4×100-metre medley, which qualified for the finals, finishing in 7th place.

On May 1, 2002, Tomazini broke the short-course South American record in the 200-metre breaststroke, with a time of 2:10.47 (breaking his own previous record of 2:10.79).

He swam at the 2002 Pan Pacific Swimming Championships, where he finished 8th in the 200-metre breaststroke.

Participating in the 2003 World Aquatics Championships, Tomazini finished 27th in the 200-metre breaststroke.

At the 2003 Pan American Games in Santo Domingo, Dominican Republic, Tomazini won the bronze medal in the 200-metre breaststroke, beating the South American record with a time of 2:15.87.

== Records ==
Tomazini is the former holder of the following records:

Long Course (50 meters):

- Former South American record holder of the 200m breaststroke: 2:15.87, time obtained on August 14, 2003
- Former South American record holder of the 4 × 100 m medley: 3:40.27, time obtained in August 1999, along with Alexandre Massura, Fernando Scherer and Gustavo Borges

Short course (25 meters):

- Former South American record holder of the 50m breaststroke: 27.67, time obtained on July 6, 2001
- Former South American record holder of the 100m breaststroke: 1:00.23, time obtained on July 8, 2001
- Former South American record holder of the 200m breaststroke: 2:10.47, time obtained on May 1, 2002
