= Angela Chuck =

Jamaican swimmer (born 1981)

Personal information
- Full name: Angela Dawn Chuck
- National team: Jamaica
- Born: 14 February 1981 (age 45) Kingston, Jamaica
- Height: 1.73 m (5 ft 8 in)
- Weight: 66 kg (146 lb)

Sport
- Sport: Swimming
- Strokes: Freestyle
Medal record
Women's swimming
Representing Jamaica
Central American and Caribbean Games
Gold medal – first place	2002 San Salvador	200 m freestyle
Bronze medal – third place	2002 San Salvador	100 m freestyle

Angela Dawn Chuck (born 14 February 1981) is a Jamaican former swimmer, who specialized in sprint freestyle events. She won a total of two medals, gold in the 200 m freestyle (2:07.81), and bronze in the 100 m freestyle (58.91), at the 2002 Central American and Caribbean Games in San Salvador, El Salvador. Chuck is a two-time Olympian (2000 and 2004) and a psychology graduate of Brown University in Providence, Rhode Island.

Chuck made her first Jamaican team at the 2000 Summer Olympics in Sydney, where she competed in the women's 50 m freestyle. Swimming in heat four, she picked up a second spot and forty-ninth overall by 0.60 of a second behind leader Yekaterina Tochenaya of Kazakhstan in 27.48.

At the 2004 Summer Olympics in Athens, Chuck qualified for the 100 m freestyle, by posting a FINA B-standard entry time of 57.59 from the Caribbean Championships in Kingston. She challenged seven other swimmers on the third heat, including Olympic veterans Dominique Diezi of Switzerland and Lara Heinz of Luxembourg. She edged out Iceland's Ragnheiður Ragnarsdóttir to take a seventh spot by 0.14 of a second, outside her entry time of 58.33. Chuck failed to advance into the semifinals, as she placed thirty-ninth overall in the preliminaries.

Shortly after her second Olympics, Chuck retired from swimming to work as an assistant coach for the Blue Devils at Duke University in Durham, North Carolina.
