= Tammie Stone =

American swimmer (born 1976)

Personal information
- Born: Tammie Spatz; 1976 (age 49–50) Saginaw, Michigan

Sport
- Sport: Swimming
Medal record
Swimming
Representing United States
FINA World Championships (LC)
Silver medal – second place	2001 Fukuoka	4x100m freestyle relay
FINA World Championships (SC)
Silver medal – second place	2000 Athens	4x200m freestyle relay
Silver medal – second place	2002 Moscow	4x100m medley relay
Silver medal – second place	2002 Moscow	4x200m freestyle relay
Bronze medal – third place	2000 Athens	4x100m medley relay
Bronze medal – third place	2002 Moscow	50m freestyle
Pan American Games
Gold medal – first place	1999 Winnipeg	50m freestyle
Gold medal – first place	1999 Winnipeg	4x100m medley relay
Silver medal – second place	1999 Winnipeg	100m freestyle
Silver medal – second place	1999 Winnipeg	4x100m freestyle relay
Pan Pacific Championships
Bronze medal – third place	2002 Yokohama	50m freestyle

Tammie Spatz-Stone (born 1976) is an American former competitive swimmer. Stone won the bronze medal in the 2002 Pan Pacific Swimming championship alongside Jenny Thompson and Jodie Henry.

== Personal life ==
Tammie began taking swimming lessons at YMCA.
