= Barbados at the 1999 Pan American Games =

- IOC code: BAR
- NOC: Barbados Olympic Association

in Winnipeg 23 July – 8 August 1999
- Medals Ranked 21st: Gold 0 Silver 1 Bronze 1 Total 2

Pan American Games appearances (overview)
- 1963; 1967; 1971; 1975; 1979; 1983; 1987; 1991; 1995; 1999; 2003; 2007; 2011; 2015; 2019; 2023; 2027

The 13th Pan American Games were held in Winnipeg, Manitoba, Canada from July 23 to August 8, 1999.

== Medals ==
=== Silver ===
===== Athletics =====
- Women's 400m Hurdles: Andrea Blackett

=== Bronze ===
===== Athletics =====
- Women's 4x400 metres: Joanne Durant, Melissa Straker, Andrea Blackett, and Tanya Oxley

== See also ==
- Sport in Barbados
- Barbados at the 2000 Summer Olympics
