= Ecuador at the 1999 Pan American Games =

- IOC code: ECU
- NOC: Comité Olímpico Ecuatoriano
- Website: www.coe.org.ec

in Winnipeg 23 July – 8 August 1999
- Medals Ranked 15th: Gold 1 Silver 2 Bronze 5 Total 8

Pan American Games appearances (overview)
- 1951; 1955; 1959; 1963; 1967; 1971; 1975; 1979; 1983; 1987; 1991; 1995; 1999; 2003; 2007; 2011; 2015; 2019; 2023; 2027

The 13th Pan American Games were held in Winnipeg, Manitoba, Canada from July 23 to August 8, 1999.

== Medals ==
=== Gold ===
===== Weightlifting =====
- Men's Heavyweight (– 105 kg): Boris Burov

=== Silver ===
===== Weightlifting =====
- Men's Middleweight (– 77 kg): Walter Llerena
- Men's Light-Heavyweight (– 85 kg): José Llerena

=== Bronze ===
===== Athletics =====
- Men's 20 km Road Walk: Jefferson Pérez

===== Boxing =====
- Men's Light Flyweight (– 48 kg): Patricio Calero

===== Judo =====
- Women's Heavyweight (+ 78 kg): Carmen Chalá

===== Karate =====
- Men's Kumite (– 70 kg): William Preciado

===== Taekwondo =====
- Men's Middleweight (– 80 kg): Cristian Peñafiel

== See also ==
- Ecuador at the 2000 Summer Olympics
