= Venezuela at the 1999 Pan American Games =

- IOC code: VEN
- NOC: Venezuelan Olympic Committee
- Website: www.cov.com.ve

in Winnipeg 23 July – 8 August 1999
- Medals Ranked 8th: Gold 7 Silver 16 Bronze 17 Total 40

Pan American Games appearances (overview)
- 1951; 1955; 1959; 1963; 1967; 1971; 1975; 1979; 1983; 1987; 1991; 1995; 1999; 2003; 2007; 2011; 2015; 2019; 2023

The 13th Pan American Games were held in Winnipeg, Manitoba, Canada from July 23 to August 8, 1999.

== Medals ==
=== Gold ===
===== Karate =====
- Men's Kumite (– 75 kg): Ricardo Pérez
- Women's Kumite (– 60 kg): María Wayow

=== Silver ===
===== Bowling =====
- Women's Singles: Alicia Marcano

===== Boxing =====
- Men's Bantamweight (– 54 kg): Nehomar Cermeno

===== Karate =====
- Men's Kata: Antonio Díaz
- Men's Kumite (– 70 kg): Jaime Noguera

=== Bronze ===
===== Boxing =====
- Men's Lightweight (– 60 kg): Patrick López
- Men's Welterweight (– 67 kg): Charlie Navarro
- Men's Middleweight (– 75 kg): Jim Rodriguez

===== Karate =====
- Men's Kumite (– 60 kg): Eduardo Noguera
- Men's Kumite (– 70 kg): Jean Carlos Peña
- Women's Kata: Ana Martínez

== See also ==
- Venezuela at the 2000 Summer Olympics
