= Volleyball at the 1992 Summer Olympics – Men's tournament =

Men's volleyball at the Games of the XXV Olympiad
- Venue: Palau Sant Jordi (finals), Palau dels Esports de Barcelona and Pavelló de la Vall d'Hebron
- Date: 26 July – 9 August
- Competitors: 142 from 12 nations

Medalists
1st place, gold medalist(s)		Brazil (1st title)
2nd place, silver medalist(s)		Netherlands
3rd place, bronze medalist(s)		United States

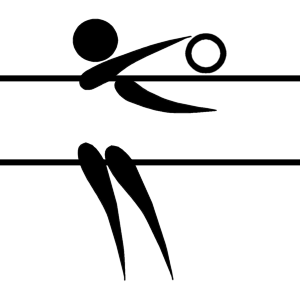

The men's tournament in volleyball at the 1992 Summer Olympics was the 8th edition of the event at the Summer Olympics, organized by the world's governing body, the FIVB in conjunction with the IOC. It was held in Barcelona, Spain from 26 July to 9 August 1992.

== Qualification ==
Means of qualification	Date	Host	Vacancies	Qualified
Host Country	17 October 1986	(Switzerland) Lausanne	1	Spain
1988 Olympic Games	17 September – 2 October 1988	(South Korea) Seoul	1	United States
1989 World Cup	17–26 November 1989	Japan	1	Cuba
1990 World Championship	18–28 October 1990	Brazil	1	Italy
1991 African Championship	July 1991	(Egypt) Cairo	1	Algeria
1991 Asian Championsnip	11–16 August 1991	(Australia) Perth	1	Japan
1991 European Championship	7–15 September 1991	Germany	1	Soviet Union
1991 NORCECA Championship	25 August – 3 September 1991	(Canada) Regina	1	Canada
1991 South American Championship	14–22 September 1991	Brazil	1	Brazil
1991 World Cup	22 November – 1 December 1991	Japan	1	South Korea
1st World Qualifier	10–15 May 1992	(France) Montpellier	1	France
2nd World Qualifier	10–15 May 1992	(Netherlands) Rotterdam	1	Netherlands
Total			12	

== Pools composition ==
Pool A	Pool B
Spain (Hosts)	Algeria
Canada	Brazil
France	Cuba
Italy	Netherlands
Japan	South Korea
United States	Unified Team

== Venues ==
Main venue	Sub venue	Sub venue
Barcelona, Spain	Barcelona, Spain	Barcelona, Spain
Palau Sant Jordi	Palau dels Esports de Barcelona	Pavelló de la Vall d'Hebron
Capacity: 17,000	Capacity: 8,000	Capacity: 2,500
		No Image

== Preliminary round ==
=== Pool A ===
Pos	Team	Pld	W	L	Pts	SW	SL	SR	SPW	SPL	SPR	Qualification
1	Italy	5	4	1	9	13	5	2.600	253	192	1.318	Quarterfinals
2	United States	5	4	1	9	13	8	1.625	287	257	1.117	Quarterfinals
3	Spain	5	3	2	8	11	12	0.917	283	299	0.946	Quarterfinals
4	Japan	5	2	3	7	10	12	0.833	277	291	0.952	Quarterfinals
5	Canada	5	1	4	6	10	12	0.833	286	279	1.025	9th place match
6	France	5	1	4	6	6	14	0.429	200	268	0.746	11th place match

26 July 1992	Japan	3–1	United States
26 July 1992	(8–15, 15–11, 15–10, 15–13)

26 July 1992	Italy	3–1	France
26 July 1992	(9–15, 15–5, 15–8, 15–2)

26 July 1992	Spain	3–2	Canada
26 July 1992	(13–15, 15–7, 9–15, 15–12, 15–13)

28 July 1992	United States	3–2	Canada
28 July 1992	(15–12, 15–12, 10–15, 11–15, 16–14)

28 July 1992	France	3–2	Japan
28 July 1992	(15–8, 9–15, 15–11, 10–15, 15–9)

28 July 1992	Italy	3–0	Spain
28 July 1992	(16–14, 15–6, 15–7)

30 July 1992	Italy	3–0	Japan
30 July 1992	(15–13, 15–7, 17–15)

30 July 1992	Canada	3–0	France
30 July 1992	(15–7, 15–8, 15–6)

30 July 1992	United States	3–2	Spain
30 July 1992	(15–6, 14–16, 12–15, 15–10, 15–11)

1 August 1992	Spain	3–2	Japan
1 August 1992	(15–8, 5–15, 15–17, 15–7, 15–13)

1 August 1992	Italy	3–1	Canada
1 August 1992	(15–11, 8–15, 15–12, 15–7)

1 August 1992	United States	3–0	France
1 August 1992	(15–5, 15–12, 15–8)

3 August 1992	Japan	3–2	Canada
3 August 1992	(11–15, 15–17, 15–11, 15–13, 15–10)

3 August 1992	Spain	3–2	France
3 August 1992	(10–15, 11–15, 15–9, 15–9, 15–12)

3 August 1992	United States	3–1	Italy
3 August 1992	(9–15, 16–14, 15–11, 15–13)

=== Pool B ===
Pos	Team	Pld	W	L	Pts	SW	SL	SR	SPW	SPL	SPR	Qualification
1	Brazil	5	5	0	10	15	2	7.500	248	165	1.503	Quarterfinals
2	Cuba	5	4	1	9	13	5	2.600	231	180	1.283	Quarterfinals
3	Unified Team	5	3	2	8	11	7	1.571	229	205	1.117	Quarterfinals
4	Netherlands	5	2	3	7	8	9	0.889	218	181	1.204	Quarterfinals
5	South Korea	5	1	4	6	3	12	0.250	142	212	0.670	9th place match
6	Algeria	5	0	5	5	0	15	0.000	100	225	0.444	11th place match

26 July 1992	Cuba	3–1	Netherlands
26 July 1992	(15–12, 17–15, 6–15, 15–10)

26 July 1992	Unified Team	3–0	Algeria
26 July 1992	(15–8, 15–7, 15–4)

26 July 1992	Brazil	3–0	South Korea
26 July 1992	(15–13, 16–14, 15–7)

28 July 1992	Cuba	3–0	Algeria
28 July 1992	(15–4, 15–2, 15–3)

28 July 1992	Brazil	3–1	Unified Team
28 July 1992	(15–6, 15–7, 9–15, 16–14)

28 July 1992	Netherlands	3–0	South Korea
28 July 1992	(15–5, 15–5, 15–7)

30 July 1992	South Korea	3–0	Algeria
30 July 1992	(15–8, 15–11, 15–12)

30 July 1992	Brazil	3–0	Netherlands
30 July 1992	(15–11, 15–9, 15–4)

30 July 1992	Cuba	3–1	Unified Team
30 July 1992	(8–15, 15–10, 15–12, 15–5)

1 August 1992	Unified Team	3–0	South Korea
1 August 1992	(15–9, 15–6, 15–11)

1 August 1992	Netherlands	3–0	Algeria
1 August 1992	(15–2, 15–5, 15–4)

1 August 1992	Brazil	3–1	Cuba
1 August 1992	(15–6, 15–8, 12–15, 15–6)

3 August 1992	Unified Team	3–1	Netherlands
3 August 1992	(8–15, 15–9, 17–16, 15–12)

3 August 1992	Cuba	3–0	South Korea
3 August 1992	(15–5, 15–7, 15–8)

3 August 1992	Brazil	3–0	Algeria
3 August 1992	(15–8, 15–13, 15–9)

== Final round ==
=== 11th–12th places ===
==== 11th place match ====
5 August 1992	France	3–0	Algeria
5 August 1992	(15–4, 15–9, 15–9)

=== 9th–10th places ===
==== 9th place match ====
5 August 1992	Canada	1–3	South Korea
5 August 1992	(10–15, 15–12, 10–15, 10–15)

=== Final eight ===
Quarterfinals
5 August
Italy	2
Netherlands	3
5 August
Spain	0
Cuba	3
5 August
United States	3
Unified Team	1
5 August
Japan	0
Brazil	3

Semifinals
7 August
Netherlands	3
Cuba	0
7 August
United States	1
Brazil	3

Gold medal match
9 August
Netherlands	0
Brazil	3
Bronze medal match
9 August
Cuba	1
United States	3

5th–8th semifinals
6 August
Italy	3
Spain	0
6 August
Unified Team	2
Japan	3

5th place match
7 August
Italy	3
Japan	0
7th place match
7 August
Spain	2
Unified Team	3

==== Quarterfinals ====
5 August 1992	Italy	2–3	Netherlands
5 August 1992	(9–15, 15–12, 15–8, 2–15, 16–17)

5 August 1992	Spain	0–3	Cuba
5 August 1992	(14–16, 9–15, 6–15)

5 August 1992	Japan	0–3	Brazil
5 August 1992	(12–15, 5–15, 12–15)

5 August 1992	United States	3–1	Unified Team
5 August 1992	(12–15, 15–10, 15–4, 15–11)

==== 5th–8th semifinals ====
6 August 1992	Italy	3–0	Spain
6 August 1992	(15–4, 15–12, 15–4)

6 August 1992	Unified Team	2–3	Japan
6 August 1992	(8–15, 15–9, 13–15, 15–12, 16–17)

==== Semifinals ====
7 August 1992	Netherlands	3–0	Cuba
7 August 1992	(15–11, 15–13, 15–9)

7 August 1992	United States	1–3	Brazil
7 August 1992	(15–12, 8–15, 9–15, 12–15)

==== 7th place match ====
7 August 1992	Spain	2–3	Unified Team
7 August 1992	(14–16, 15–12, 8–15, 15–5, 12–15)

==== 5th place match ====
7 August 1992	Italy	3–0	Japan
7 August 1992	(15–2, 15–7, 15–13)

==== Bronze medal match ====
9 August 1992	Cuba	1–3	United States
9 August 1992	(15–12, 13–15, 7–15, 11–15)

==== Gold medal match ====
9 August 1992	Netherlands	0–3	Brazil
9 August 1992	(12–15, 8–15, 5–15)

== Final standing ==
Rank	Team
1st place, gold medalist(s)	Brazil
2nd place, silver medalist(s)	Netherlands
3rd place, bronze medalist(s)	United States
4	Cuba
5	Italy
6	Japan
7	Unified Team
8	Spain
9	South Korea
10	Canada
11	France
12	Algeria

1992 Men's Olympic champions

Brazil
1st title

12–man roster
Marcelo Negrão, Jorge Edson, Giovane, Paulão, Maurício, Janelson, Douglas, Carlão, Amauri, Pampa, Tande, Talmo
Head coach
Zé Roberto

== Medalists ==
Gold	Silver	Bronze
Brazil Marcelo Negrão; Jorge Brito; Giovane Gávio; Paulo Silva; Maurício Lima; Janelson Carvalho; Douglas Chiarotti; Antônio Gouveia; Amauri Ribeiro; André Ferreira; Alexandre Samuel; Talmo Oliveira Head coach: Zé Roberto	Netherlands Martin Teffer; Henk-Jan Held; Ron Boudrie; Marko Klok; Ron Zwerver; Avital Selinger; Edwin Benne; Olof van der Meulen; Peter Blangé; Jan Posthuma; Martin van der Horst; Ronald Zoodsma Head coach: Arie Selinger	United States Eric Sato; Jeff Stork; Steve Timmons; Bryan Ivie; Douglas Partie; Bob Samuelson; Scott Fortune; Dan Greenbaum; Brent Hilliard; Nick Becker; Carlos Briceno; Bob Ctvrtlik Head coach: Fred Strum

== Awards ==
- Most valuable player
  (Brazil) Marcelo Negrão
- Best spiker
  (Brazil) Marcelo Negrão
- Best blocker
  Ruslan Olikhver
- Best server
  (Netherlands) Ron Zwerver
- Best digger
  (United States) Scott Fortune
- Best setter
  (Brazil) Maurício Lima
- Best receiver
  (United States) Bob Ctvrtlik

== See also ==
- Volleyball at the 1992 Summer Olympics
- Volleyball at the 1992 Summer Olympics – Women's tournament
