= Brazil at the 1991 Pan American Games =

- IOC code: BRA
- NOC: Brazilian Olympic Committee
- Website: www.cob.org.br

in Havana 2–18 August 1991
- Competitors: 304 in 27 sports
- Flag bearer: Robson Caetano
- Medals Ranked 4th: Gold 21 Silver 21 Bronze 37 Total 79

Pan American Games appearances (overview)
- 1951; 1955; 1959; 1963; 1967; 1971; 1975; 1979; 1983; 1987; 1991; 1995; 1999; 2003; 2007; 2011; 2015; 2019; 2023

Brazil competed at the 11th Pan American Games held in Havana, Cuba from August 2 to August 18, 1991.

== Medals ==
The following competitors from Brazil won medals at the games. In the by discipline sections below, medalists' names are bolded.

| Medal | Name(s) | Sport | Event | Date | Ref |
|---|---|---|---|---|---|
| Gold | Robson Caetano | Athletics | Men's 100m | 5 August 1991 | |
| Gold | Robson Caetano | Athletics | Men's 200m | 8 August 1991 | |
| Gold | Eronilde de Araújo | Athletics | Men's 400m hurdles | 10 August 1991 | |
| Gold | José Mauro Valente | Athletics | Men's 1500m | 8 August 1991 | |
| Gold | Adauto Domingues | Athletics | Men's 3000m steeplechase | 5 August 1991 | |
| Silver | Anísio Silva | Athletics | Men's triple jump | 10 August 1991 | |
| Bronze | Marcelo Palma | Athletics | Men's 20km walk | 4 August 1991 | |
| Silver | José Carlos Santana | Athletics | Men's marathon | 3 August 1991 | |
| Gold | Pedro Ferreira da Silva | Athletics | Men's decathlon | 8 August 1991 | |
| Bronze | Carmen Furtado | Athletics | Women's 3000m | 4 August 1991 | |
| Gold | Women's basketball team: Adriana dos Santos Ana Lucia Mota Hortência Marcari Janeth Arcain Joycenara Batista Maria Paula Silva Marta Sobral Nádia Bento de Lima Roseli Gustavo Ruth Roberta de Souza Simone Pontello Vânia Hernandes | Basketball | Women's tournament | 12 August 1991 | |
| Bronze | Luiz Claudio Freitas | Boxing | Men's flyweight (-51 kg) | | |
| Bronze | Rogério Dezorzi | Boxing | Men's featherweight (-57 kg) | | |
| Bronze | Luiz Fernando Silva | Boxing | Men's light welterweight (-63,5 kg) | | |
| Bronze | Lucas França | Boxing | Men's light middleweight (-71 kg) | | |
| Bronze | Wanderley Magalhães | Cycling | Men's race individual (road) | | |
| Bronze | Vitor Alves Teixeira | Equestrian | Jumping | | |
| Gold | André Johannpeter; Luiz Felipe de Azevedo; Marcelo Artiaga; Vitor Alves Teixeira | Equestrian | Jumping team | | |
| Gold | Luísa Parente | Gymnastics | Women's uneven bars | | |
| Gold | Luísa Parente | Gymnastics | Women's vault | | |
| Silver | Alessandra Frederico; Alessandra Seligman; Bibiana Castro; Débora Morais; Gabriela Baal; Valquíria Rosário | Gymnastics | Rhythmic gymnastics group all-around | | |
| Silver | Men's handball team: Almir Albuquerque Antonio Carlos Gonçalves Cláudio Brito Fausto Steinwandter Gilberto Cardoso Ivan Maziero Ivan Raimundo Pinheiro José Ronaldo do Nascimento José Luiz Vieira Osvaldo Inocente Filho Paulo Roberto Martins Sergio Hortelan Valmir Fassina | Handball | Men's tournament | | |
| Bronze | Sumio Tsujimoto | Judo | Men's flyweight (-56 kg) | | |
| Gold | Shigueto Yamasaki | Judo | Men's extra lightweight (-60 kg) | | |
| Silver | Sérgio Ricardo Oliveira | Judo | Men's lightweight (-71 kg) | | |
| Bronze | Renato Gagnino | Judo | Men's half middleweight (-78 kg) | | |
| Bronze | Frederico Flexa | Judo | Men's heavyweight (+95 kg) | | |
| Bronze | Monica Angelucci | Judo | Women's flyweight (-45 kg) | | |
| Bronze | Maria Cristina de Souza | Judo | Women's extra lightweight (-48 kg) | | |
| Silver | Patricia Bevilacqua | Judo | Women's half lightweight (-52 kg) | | |
| Bronze | Edilene Andrade | Judo | Women's heavyweight (+72 kg) | | |
| Bronze | Soraia André | Judo | Women's open class | | |
| Silver | Men's roller hockey team: Alan Feres Karan Antonio Cavalaro Fabio Mainardi Flávio Pontes Guide Jurandir da Silva Leônidas Agra Marcelo Cavalaro Maurício Duque Roberto Caribe Vitor Manuel Santos | Roller sports | Roller hockey | | |
| Bronze | Carlos de Almeida; Cláudio Tavares | Rowing | Men's coxless pair-oared shells | | |
| Bronze | Alexandre Fernandes; Marcos Arantes; Oswaldo Kuster Neto | Rowing | Men's coxed pair-oared shells | | |
| Silver | Christoph Bergmann | Sailing | Finn class | | |
| Gold | Peter Tanscheit | Sailing | Men's Laser class | | |
| Silver | Bernardo Arndt; Eduardo Melchert | Sailing | Men's 470 class | | |
| Silver | Antonio Paes Leme; Luís Marcelo Maia | Sailing | Snipe class | | |
| Bronze | Cláudio Biekarck; Gunnar Ficker; Marcelo Batista da Silva | Sailing | Lightning class | | |
| Silver | Marion Scheel | Sailing | Women's Laser Radial class | | |
| Bronze | Cláudia Swan; Monica Scheel | Sailing | Women's 470 class | | |
| Bronze | Wilson Scheidemantel | Shooting | Men's 10m air pistol | | |
| Bronze | Alejandro Stisin; Durval Guimarães; Wilson Scheidemantel | Shooting | Men's 10m air pistol team | | |
| Silver | Durval Guimarães; Jodson Edington; Wilson Scheidemantel | Shooting | Men's 25m center fire pistol team | | |
| Bronze | Tânia Giansante | Shooting | Women's 10m air pistol | | |
| Bronze | Angelamaria Lachtermacher; Lucia Maria Bosco; Victoria Egger | Shooting | Women's 50m rifle prone team | | |
| Bronze | Angelamaria Lachtermacher; Lucia Maria Bosco; Victoria Egger | Shooting | Women's 50m rifle three positions team | | |
| Bronze | Gustavo Borges | Swimming | Men's 50m freestyle | 17 August 1991 | |
| Bronze | Eduardo Piccinini | Swimming | Men's 100m butterfly | 13 August 1991 | |
| Gold | Gustavo Borges | Swimming | Men's 100m freestyle | 14 August 1991 | |
| Gold | Rogério Romero | Swimming | Men's 200m backstroke | 14 August 1991 | |
| Silver | Gustavo Borges | Swimming | Men's 200m freestyle | 12 August 1991 | |
| Gold | Emanuel Nascimento; Gustavo Borges; Júlio López; Teófilo Ferreira | Swimming | Men's 4 × 100 m freestyle relay | 16 August 1991 | |
| Silver | Cassiano Leal; Emanuel Nascimento; Gustavo Borges; Teófilo Ferreira | Swimming | Men's 4 × 200 m freestyle relay | 13 August 1991 | |
| Bronze | Isabelle Vieira; Paula Marsiglia; Paula Renata Aguiar; Paoletti Filippini | Swimming | Women's 4 × 100 m freestyle relay | 14 August 1991 | |
| Silver | Ana Catarina Azevedo; Glicia Lofego; Paoletti Filippini; Celina Endo | Swimming | Women's 4 × 100 m medley relay | 17 August 1991 | |
| Gold | Hugo Hoyama | Table tennis | Men's singles | | |
| Silver | Cláudio Kano | Table tennis | Men's singles | | |
| Gold | Cláudio Kano; Hugo Hoyama | Table tennis | Men's doubles | | |
| Bronze | Carlos Kawai; Silney Yuta | Table tennis | Men's doubles | | |
| Gold | Carlos Kawai; Cláudio Kano; Hugo Hoyama; Silney Yuta | Table tennis | Men's team | | |
| Bronze | Carla Tibério; Lyanne Kosaka; Marta Massuda; Monica Doti | Table tennis | Women's team | | |
| Bronze | César Galvão | Taekwondo | Men's finweight (-50 kg) | | |
| Gold | Fábio Goulart | Taekwondo | Men's middleweight (-83 kg) | | |
| Silver | Lúcio Freitas | Taekwondo | Men's heavyweight (+83 kg) | | |
| Bronze | Marcelo Saliola | Tennis | Men's singles | | |
| Gold | Marcelo Saliola; Nelson Aerts; William Kyriakos Jr. | Tennis | Men's team | | |
| Bronze | Andrea Vieira | Tennis | Women's singles | | |
| Bronze | Cláudia Chabalgoity | Tennis | Women's singles | | |
| Silver | Andrea Vieira; Cláudia Chabalgoity | Tennis | Women's doubles | | |
| Gold | Andrea Vieira; Cláudia Chabalgoity; Gisele Miró | Tennis | Women's team | | |
| Silver | Cláudia Chabalgoity; William Kyriakos Jr. | Tennis | Mixed doubles | | |
| Silver | Men's volleyball team: Tande Allan Cocato Pampa Carlão Carlos Toaldo Kid Giovane Gávio Janelson Carvalho Jorge Edson Marcelo Negrão Maurício Lima Talmo Oliveira | Volleyball | Men's tournament | 18 August 1991 | |
| Silver | Women's volleyball team: Adriana Samuel Ana Moser Ana Flávia Sanglard Ana Ida Alvares Ana Maria Volponi Cilene Rocha Cristina Lopes Fernanda Venturini Fofão Kerly Santos Ricarda Lima Silvana Kühl | Volleyball | Women's tournament | 18 August 1991 | |
| Bronze | Men's water polo team: Antonio Carlos Costa Armando Gutfreund Daniel Mameri Eduardo Comini Eric Borges Fernando Rocha Filho Giuliano Bertolucci Hélio Gomes Filho José Meireles Paulo Abreu Paulo Comini Roberto Chiappini Rodney Andrew Bell | Water polo | Men's tournament | | |
| Bronze | Emilson Dantas | Weightlifting | Men's first heavyweight (-100 kg) – snatch | | |
| Bronze | Emilson Dantas | Weightlifting | Men's first heavyweight (-100 kg) – clean and jerk | | |
| Bronze | Emilson Dantas | Weightlifting | Men's first heavyweight (-100 kg) – total | | |

**Medals by sport**
| **Sport** | 1st place, gold medalist(s) | 2nd place, silver medalist(s) | 3rd place, bronze medalist(s) | Total |
| Athletics | 6 | 2 | 2 | 10 |
| Swimming | 3 | 3 | 3 | 9 |
| Table tennis | 3 | 1 | 2 | 6 |
| Tennis | 2 | 2 | 3 | 7 |
| Gymnastics | 2 | 1 | 0 | 3 |
| Sailing | 1 | 4 | 2 | 7 |
| Judo | 1 | 2 | 7 | 10 |
| Taekwondo | 1 | 1 | 1 | 3 |
| Equestrian | 1 | 0 | 1 | 2 |
| Basketball | 1 | 0 | 0 | 1 |
| Volleyball | 0 | 2 | 0 | 2 |
| Shooting | 0 | 1 | 5 | 6 |
| Handball | 0 | 1 | 0 | 1 |
| Roller sports | 0 | 1 | 0 | 1 |
| Boxing | 0 | 0 | 4 | 4 |
| Weightlifting | 0 | 0 | 3 | 3 |
| Rowing | 0 | 0 | 2 | 2 |
| Cycling | 0 | 0 | 1 | 1 |
| Waterpolo | 0 | 0 | 1 | 1 |
| **Total** | **21** | **21** | **37** | 79 |

== See also ==
- Brazil at the 1992 Summer Olympics
