= 1994 Hellmann's Cup – Doubles =

Doubles
- 1994 Hellmann's Cup

Final
- Champions: (Czech Republic) Karel Nováček; (Sweden) Mats Wilander
- Runners-up: (Spain) Tomás Carbonell; (Spain) Francisco Roig
- Score: 4–6, 7–6, 7–6

Events
Singles	Doubles
← 1993 ·	Chile Open	· 1995 →

Mike Bauer and David Rikl were the defending champions, but did not participate this year.

Karel Nováček and Mats Wilander won the title, defeating Tomás Carbonell and Francisco Roig 4–6, 7–6, 7–6 in the final.

== Seeds ==
1. (Spain) Sergio Casal / (Spain) Emilio Sánchez (first round)
2. (Italy) Cristian Brandi / (Italy) Federico Mordegan (first round)
3. (Spain) Tomás Carbonell / (Spain) Francisco Roig (final)
4. (United States) Donald Johnson / (United States) Greg Van Emburgh (first round)

== Draw ==
=== Key ===
- Q = Qualifier
- WC = Wild card
- LL = Lucky loser
- Alt = Alternate
- ITF = ITF entry
- PR = Protected ranking
- SR = Special ranking
- SE = Special exempt
- JE = Junior exempt
- JR = Junior Accelerator Programme entrant
- CO = College Accelerator Programme entrant
- NG = Next Gen Accelerator Program entrant
- w/o = Walkover
- r = Retired
- d = Defaulted

=== Draw ===
First round

Quarterfinals

Semifinals

Final

1
- (Spain) S Casal
- (Spain) E Sánchez
6
6
6

- (Czech Republic) K Nováček
- (Sweden) M Wilander
3
7
7

- (Czech Republic) K Nováček
- (Sweden) M Wilander
6
6
6

WC
- (Chile) M Ríos
- (Chile) G Silberstein
6
6
3

WC
- (Spain) A Berasategui
- (Chile) S Cortes
7
2
4

WC
- (Spain) A Berasategui
- (Chile) S Cortés
7
3
6

- (Czech Republic) K Nováček
- (Sweden) M Wilander
6
6

4
- (United States) D Johnson
- (United States) G Van Emburgh
2
6

Q
- (Spain) À Corretja
- (Chile) M Rebolledo
4
4

Q
- (Spain) À Corretja
- (Chile) M Rebolledo
6
7

Q
- (Spain) À Corretja
- (Chile) M Rebolledo
w/o

- (United States) D Flach
- (Argentina) J Garat
7
6

- (United States) D Flach
- (Argentina) J Garat

- (Portugal) E Couto
- (Portugal) J Cunha e Silva
6
3

- (Czech Republic) K Nováček
- (Sweden) M Wilander
4
7
7

WC
- (Argentina) J Frana
- (Mexico) L Lavalle
4
4

3
- (Spain) T Carbonell
- (Spain) F Roig
6
6
6

- (Mexico) J Lozano
- (Venezuela) M Ruah
6
6

- (Mexico) J Lozano
- (Venezuela) M Ruah
3
3

- (Spain) JA Conde
- (Argentina) D Orsanic
4
5

3
- (Spain) T Carbonell
- (Spain) F Roig
6
6

3
- (Spain) T Carbonell
- (Spain) F Roig
6
7

3
- (Spain) T Carbonell
- (Spain) F Roig
4
6
7

- (Brazil) O Della
- (Brazil) M Saliola
6
6
6

- (Netherlands) T Kempers
- (United States) J Waite
6
3
6

- (Netherlands) T Kempers
- (United States) J Waite
7
4
7

- (Netherlands) T Kempers
- (United States) J Waite
7
6

- (Spain) J Arrese
- (Argentina) L Lobo
3
7
6

- (Spain) J Arrese
- (Argentina) L Lobo
6
2

2
- (Italy) C Brandi
- (Italy) F Mordegan
6
6
3
