= 1993 ATP Challenger Series =

Tennis tour

Details
- Duration: 4 January 1993 – 19 December 1993
- Edition: 16th
- Tournaments: 97

Achievements (singles)

The ATP Challenger Series is the second tier tour for professional tennis organised by the Association of Tennis Professionals (ATP). The 1993 ATP Challenger Series calendar comprised 97 tournaments, with prize money ranging from $25,000 up to $100,000.

== Schedule ==
=== January ===
Date	Country	Tournament	Prizemoney	Surface	Singles champion	Doubles champions
04.01.	New Zealand	BP National Championships	$ 50,000	Hard	(Zimbabwe) Byron Black	(United States) Paul Annacone (Zimbabwe) Byron Black
18.01.	Spain	Tenerife Challenger	$ 25,000	Hard	(Spain) José Francisco Altur	(Latvia) Ģirts Dzelde (Russia) Andrei Merinov
25.01.	Germany	Heilbronn Open	$ 100,000	Carpet (i)	(Germany) David Prinosil	(Sweden) Jan Apell (Sweden) Jonas Björkman
25.01.	India	Bangalore Challenger	$ 25,000	Clay	(Italy) Andrea Gaudenzi	(United States) Donald Johnson (India) Leander Paes

=== February ===
Date	Country	Tournament	Prizemoney	Surface	Singles champion	Doubles champions
01.02.	Germany	Lippstadt Challenger	$ 25,000	Carpet (i)	(Germany) Alexander Mronz	(Belgium) Filip Dewulf (Canada) Martin Laurendeau
01.02.	Uruguay	Punta del Este Challenger	$ 25,000	Clay	(Argentina) Javier Frana	(France) Jean-Philippe Fleurian (Netherlands) Mark Koevermans
08.02.	Canada	Vancouver Challenger	$ 50,000	Hard (i)	(United States) Kenny Thorne	(South Africa) Ellis Ferreira (United States) Richard Schmidt
08.02.	Argentina	Mar del Plata Challenger	$ 25,000	Clay	(Spain) Alberto Berasategui	(France) Jean-Philippe Fleurian (Netherlands) Mark Koevermans
08.02.	Germany	Volkswagen Challenger	$ 25,000	Clay	(Italy) Cristiano Caratti	(United States) Donald Johnson (India) Leander Paes
15.02.	France	Rennes Challenger	$ 100,000	Carpet (i)	(France) Stéphane Simian	(Sweden) Jan Apell (Sweden) Jonas Björkman
15.02.	Germany	Emden Challenger	$ 25,000	Carpet (i)	(Sweden) Tomas Nydahl	(Canada) Martin Laurendeau (Denmark) Michael Mortensen
15.02.	United States	Rancho Mirage Challenger	$ 25,000	Hard	(United States) Robbie Weiss	(United States) Todd Nelson (Sweden) Tobias Svantesson
22.02.	United States	Indian Wells Challenger	$ 50,000	Hard	(Australia) Jason Stoltenberg	(Australia) Pat Rafter (Australia) Jason Stoltenberg
22.02.	Chile	Viña del Mar Challenger	$ 25,000	Clay	(Argentina) Marcelo Ingaramo	(Chile) Marcelo Rebolledo (Argentina) Martín Rodríguez

=== March ===
Date	Country	Tournament	Prizemoney	Surface	Singles champion	Doubles champions
01.03.	Germany	Garmisch-Partenkirchen Challenger	$ 25,000	Carpet (i)	(Canada) Martin Laurendeau	(United States) Mike Bauer (Germany) Alexander Mronz
15.03.	Italy	Bergamo Challenger	$ 50,000	Hard (i)	(Sweden) Jonas Björkman	(Italy) Cristian Brandi (Italy) Cristiano Caratti
22.03.	Morocco	Agadir Challenger	$ 75,000	Clay	(Germany) Markus Naewie	(Netherlands) Menno Oosting (Croatia) Goran Prpić
29.03.	Mexico	Acapulco Challenger	$ 100,000	Clay	(Austria) Horst Skoff	(South Africa) Ellis Ferreira (United States) Richard Schmidt

=== April ===
Date	Country	Tournament	Prizemoney	Surface	Singles champion	Doubles champions
05.04.	Mexico	San Luis Potosí Challenger	$ 100,000	Clay	(Austria) Horst Skoff	(Argentina) Javier Frana (Mexico) Leonardo Lavalle
05.04.	Italy	Parioli Challenger	$ 50,000	Clay	(Italy) Vincenzo Santopadre	(Italy) Cristian Brandi (Italy) Federico Mordegan
12.04.	Spain	Barcelona Challenger	$ 50,000	Clay	(Sweden) Jonas Svensson	(Spain) Jordi Burillo (Spain) Sergio Casal
12.04.	Chile	Santiago Challenger	$ 25,000	Clay	Not completed	Not completed
19.04.	United States	Birmingham Challenger	$ 75,000	Clay	(Sweden) Mikael Pernfors	(United States) Bryan Shelton (United States) Todd Witsken
19.04.	Japan	Nagoya Challenger	$ 50,000	Hard	(Sweden) Jonas Björkman	(Sweden) Jonas Björkman (United States) Donald Johnson
19.04.	Brazil	São Paulo Challenger I	$ 50,000	Clay	(Brazil) Fernando Meligeni	(The Bahamas) Mark Knowles (United States) Richard Schmidt
19.04.	Germany	Riemerling Challenger	$ 25,000	Clay (i)	(Spain) Emilio Benfele Álvarez	(Venezuela) Maurice Ruah (United States) Mario Tabares
26.04.	Chinese Taipei	Taipei Challenger	$ 100,000	Hard	(Australia) Jason Stoltenberg	(United States) Tommy Ho (Australia) Patrick Rafter
26.04.	Italy	Rome Challenger	$ 50,000	Clay	(France) Thierry Guardiola	(South Africa) David Nainkin (South Africa) Grant Stafford

=== May ===
Date	Country	Tournament	Prizemoney	Surface	Singles champion	Doubles champions
03.05.	Slovenia	Ljubljana Challenger	$ 100,000	Clay	(Argentina) Daniel Orsanic	(Slovakia) Branislav Stankovič (Czech Republic) Richard Vogel
03.05.	Israel	Jerusalem Challenger	$ 50,000	Hard	(Israel) Gilad Bloom	(Israel) Gilad Bloom (Germany) Christian Saceanu
03.05.	Malaysia	Kuala Lumpur Challenger I	$ 50,000	Hard	(Italy) Gianluca Pozzi	(Australia) Joshua Eagle (Australia) Andrew Florent
10.05.	Germany	Ostdeutscher Sparkassen Cup	$ 50,000	Clay	(Czech Republic) David Rikl	(Netherlands) Hendrik Jan Davids (Russia) Yevgeny Kafelnikov
17.05.	Austria	Bruck Challenger	$ 25,000	Clay	(Ukraine) Dimitri Poliakov	(Sweden) Nils Holm (Sweden) Lars-Anders Wahlgren
24.05.	Germany	Bochum Challenger	$ 25,000	Clay	(Sweden) Mikael Pernfors	(Sweden) Mårten Renström (Netherlands) Joost Winnink
31.05.	Italy	Turin Challenger	$ 100,000	Clay	(Australia) Richard Fromberg	(Australia) Andrew Kratzmann (Sweden) Mårten Renström
31.05.	Germany	Quelle Cup	$ 50,000	Clay	(Sweden) Mikael Pernfors	(Sweden) Nils Holm (Sweden) Lars-Anders Wahlgren

=== June ===
Date	Country	Tournament	Prizemoney	Surface	Singles champion	Doubles champions
14.06.	Slovakia	Košice Challenger	$ 25,000	Clay	(Czech Republic) David Rikl	(Slovakia) Branislav Stankovič (Slovakia) Marián Vajda
28.06.	Portugal	Oporto Challenger I	$ 25,000	Clay (i)	(Morocco) Younes El Aynaoui	(Netherlands) Menno Oosting (Czech Republic) Daniel Vacek
28.06.	Spain	Seville Challenger	$ 25,000	Clay	(Germany) Dirk Dier	(Spain) Emilio Benfele Álvarez (Spain) Pepe Imaz

=== July ===
Date	Country	Tournament	Prizemoney	Surface	Singles champion	Doubles champions
05.07.	Great Britain	Bristol Challenger	$ 50,000	Grass	(United Kingdom) Chris Bailey	not played
05.07.	Germany	Wartburg Open	$ 25,000	Clay	(Russia) Andrei Merinov	(Sweden) Christer Allgårdh (Ukraine) Dimitri Poliakov
12.07.	United States	Aptos Challenger	$ 50,000	Hard	(Australia) Pat Rafter	(Israel) Gilad Bloom (Germany) Christian Saceanu
12.07.	Germany	Müller Cup	$ 50,000	Clay	(Germany) David Prinosil	(Germany) David Prinosil (Czech Republic) Richard Vogel
12.07.	Great Britain	Newcastle Challenger	$ 50,000	Hard	(Spain) Javier Sánchez	(Sweden) Jonas Björkman (Sweden) Peter Nyborg
12.07.	Finland	Tampere Challenger	$ 50,000	Clay	(Norway) Christian Ruud	(Sweden) David Engel (Sweden) Nicklas Utgren
12.07.	Brazil	Campinas Challenger	$ 25,000	Clay	(Brazil) Fernando Meligeni	(Argentina) Gastón Etlis (Mexico) Óscar Ortiz
12.07.	Belgium	Ostend Challenger	$ 25,000	Clay	(France) Jean-Philippe Fleurian	(Netherlands) Stephen Noteboom (United States) Jack Waite
19.07.	Canada	Montebello Challenger	$ 50,000	Hard	(Italy) Cristiano Caratti	(United States) David DiLucia (United States) Doug Flach
19.07.	Netherlands	Scheveningen Challenger	$ 50,000	Clay	(Australia) Simon Youl	(Sweden) Nils Holm (Sweden) Lars-Anders Wahlgren
19.07.	Brazil	Belo Horizonte Challenger	$ 25,000	Hard	(United States) Martin Blackman	(Brazil) Ricardo Acioly (Venezuela) Nicolás Pereira
19.07.	France	Montauban Challenger	$ 25,000	Clay	(Norway) Christian Ruud	(Croatia) Saša Hiršzon (Norway) Christian Ruud
19.07.	Germany	Oberstaufen Cup	$ 25,000	Clay	(Bulgaria) Milen Velev	(Czech Republic) Ctislav Doseděl (Czech Republic) Radomír Vašek
26.07.	Poland	Poznań Challenger	$ 50,000	Clay	(Italy) Andrea Gaudenzi	(Netherlands) Michiel Schapers (Czech Republic) Daniel Vacek
26.07.	United States	Winnetka Challenger	$ 50,000	Hard	(South Africa) Kevin Ullyett	(Australia) Wayne Arthurs (United Kingdom) Mark Petchey

=== August ===
Date	Country	Tournament	Prizemoney	Surface	Singles champion	Doubles champions
02.08.	Turkey	Istanbul Challenger	$ 100,000	Hard	(Austria) Alex Antonitsch	(The Bahamas) Roger Smith (France) Jean-Philippe Fleurian
02.08.	United States	Cincinnati Challenger	$ 50,000	Hard	(United States) Doug Flach	(South Africa) Johan de Beer (Zimbabwe) Kevin Ullyett
09.08.	Spain	Open Castilla y León	$ 100,000	Hard	(Austria) Alex Antonitsch	(Spain) Juan Ignacio Carrasco (United Kingdom) Mark Petchey
09.08.	Belgium	Liège Challenger	$ 25,000	Clay	(Austria) Gilbert Schaller	(South Africa) Brendan Curry (South Africa) Kirk Haygarth
16.08.	Austria	Graz Challenger	$ 100,000	Clay	(Spain) Alberto Berasategui	(Belgium) Filip Dewulf (Belgium) Tom Vanhoudt
16.08.	United States	Bronx Challenger	$ 50,000	Hard	(France) Jean-Philippe Fleurian	(South Africa) Johan de Beer (South Africa) Kevin Ullyett
16.08.	Switzerland	Geneva Challenger	$ 50,000	Clay	(Argentina) Gabriel Markus	(Sweden) Jan Apell (Sweden) Nicklas Utgren

=== September ===
Date	Country	Tournament	Prizemoney	Surface	Singles champion	Doubles champions
06.09.	Portugal	Azores Challenger	$ 100,000	Hard	(France) Rodolphe Gilbert	(United States) Bryan Shelton (The Bahamas) Roger Smith
06.09.	Italy	Venice Challenger	$ 100,000	Clay	(Spain) Tomás Carbonell	(Argentina) Horacio de la Peña (Spain) Juan Gisbert Schultze
06.09.	Brazil	São Paulo Challenger II	$ 25,000	Clay	(Brazil) Fernando Meligeni	(Brazil) Danilo Marcelino (Brazil) Fernando Meligeni
13.09.	Hungary	Budapest Challenger	$ 50,000	Clay	(France) Jean-Philippe Fleurian	(Belgium) Filip Dewulf (Belgium) Tom Vanhoudt
13.09.	Brazil	Natal Challenger	$ 25,000	Clay	(Brazil) Jaime Oncins	(Netherlands) Stephen Noteboom (United States) Jack Waite
20.09.	Portugal	Oporto Challenger II	$ 100,000	Clay	(Argentina) Franco Davín	(South Africa) Johan de Beer (South Africa) Brent Haygarth
20.09.	Venezuela	Caracas Challenger I	$ 75,000	Hard	(Brazil) Danilo Marcelino	(United States) Richard Matuszewski (United States) John Sullivan
20.09.	Colombia	Bogotá Challenger	$ 50,000	Clay	(Colombia) Mauricio Hadad	(Colombia) Mauricio Hadad (Colombia) Miguel Tobón
20.09.	United States	Fairfield Challenger	$ 50,000	Hard	(United States) Steve DeVries	(United States) Alex O'Brien (United States) Jared Palmer
20.09.	Singapore	Singapore Challenger	$ 50,000	Hard	(South Africa) Christo van Rensburg	(United Kingdom) Jeremy Bates (South Africa) Christo van Rensburg
20.09.	Czech Republic	Prague Challenger	$ 25,000	Clay	(Austria) Gilbert Schaller	(Czech Republic) David Rikl (Czech Republic) Pavel Vízner
27.09.	Colombia	Cali Challenger	$ 50,000	Clay	(Colombia) Mauricio Hadad	(Netherlands) Tom Kempers (United States) Jack Waite

=== October ===
Date	Country	Tournament	Prizemoney	Surface	Singles champion	Doubles champions
04.10.	Mexico	Monterrey Challenger	$ 100,000	Hard	(Sweden) Lars Jönsson	(South Africa) Lan Bale (Zimbabwe) Kevin Ullyett
04.10.	Ireland	Dublin Challenger	$ 50,000	Hard (i)	(Italy) Paolo Canè	(Sweden) Mårten Renström (Sweden) Mikael Tillström
04.10.	Canada	Calgary Challenger	$ 25,000	Hard (i)	(Canada) Sébastien Lareau	(Canada) Sébastien Lareau (Canada) Daniel Nestor
04.10.	Brazil	Cotia Challenger	$ 25,000	Hard	(Peru) José Luis Noriega	(Brazil) Otávio Della (Brazil) Marcelo Saliola
11.10.	United States	Ponte Vedra Beach Challenger	$ 50,000	Hard	(France) Jean-Philippe Fleurian	(Canada) Sébastien Lareau (Canada) Daniel Nestor
11.10.	Brazil	Recife Challenger	$ 50,000	Clay	(United Kingdom) Mark Petchey	(Portugal) João Cunha e Silva (United States) Jack Waite
18.10.	Venezuela	Caracas Challenger II	$ 75,000	Hard	(Colombia) Mauricio Hadad	(Venezuela) Maurice Ruah (Italy) Laurence Tieleman
18.10.	Sweden	Gothenburg Challenger	$ 50,000	Carpet (i)	(United Kingdom) Jeremy Bates	(United Kingdom) Jeremy Bates (United Kingdom) Chris Wilkinson
18.10.	Réunion	Réunion Challenger	$ 50,000	Hard	(Haiti) Ronald Agénor	(United States) Jonathan Canter (United States) Jeff Tarango
18.10.	Brazil	Curitiba Challenger	$ 25,000	Clay	(Austria) Gilbert Schaller	(Portugal) João Cunha e Silva (United States) Jack Waite
25.10.	France	Brest Challenger	$ 100,000	Carpet (i)	(United States) Jonathan Stark	(South Africa) Ellis Ferreira (South Africa) Grant Stafford
25.10.	Germany	Munich Challenger	$ 50,000	Carpet (i)	(Czech Republic) Martin Damm	(Netherlands) Sander Groen (Germany) Arne Thoms

=== November ===
Date	Country	Tournament	Prizemoney	Surface	Singles champion	Doubles champions
01.11.	Germany	Lambertz Open by STAWAG	$ 50,000	Carpet (i)	(Sweden) Jonas Björkman	(Sweden) Jan Apell (Sweden) Jonas Björkman
15.11.	Brazil	São Luís Challenger	$ 50,000	Hard	(Czech Republic) David Rikl	(Brazil) Otávio Della (Brazil) Marcelo Saliola
22.11.	Indonesia	Jakarta Challenger	$ 50,000	Hard	(Canada) Sébastien Lareau	(South Africa) Lan Bale (South Africa) David Nainkin
22.11.	Slovenia	Rogaška Challenger	$ 25,000	Carpet (i)	(Russia) Yevgeny Kafelnikov	(Israel) Gilad Bloom (Netherlands) Fernon Wibier
29.11.	Andorra	Andorra Challenger	$ 25,000	Carpet (i)	(Germany) Jörn Renzenbrink	(Russia) Yevgeny Kafelnikov (Netherlands) Fernon Wibier
29.11.	United States	Naples Challenger	$ 50,000	Clay	(Germany) Karsten Braasch	(United States) Francisco Montana (United States) Jim Pugh
29.11.	Malaysia	Kuala Lumpur Challenger II	$ 25,000	Hard	(Germany) Alexander Mronz	(Canada) Sébastien Lareau (Canada) Daniel Nestor
29.11.	Australia	Perth Challenger	$ 25,000	Grass	(South Africa) David Adams	(Australia) Paul Kilderry (Australia) Brent Larkham

=== December ===
Date	Country	Tournament	Prizemoney	Surface	Singles champion	Doubles champions
06.12.	Bermuda	XL Bermuda Open	$ 100,000	Clay	(Sweden) Mikael Pernfors	(The Bahamas) Mark Knowles (United States) Jared Palmer
06.12.	Australia	Adelaide Challenger	$ 25,000	Grass	(United Kingdom) Mark Petchey	(Australia) Joshua Eagle (Australia) Andrew Florent
06.12.	Hong Kong	Hongkong Challenger	$ 25,000	Hard	(Sweden) David Engel	(United States) Tommy Ho (Japan) Shuzo Matsuoka
13.12.	Australia	Launceston Challenger	$ 25,000	Carpet (i)	(Australia) Brent Larkham	(Australia) Joshua Eagle (Australia) Andrew Florent
