= 1994 ATP Challenger Series =

Tennis tour

Details
- Duration: 3 January 1994 – 18 December 1994
- Edition: 17th
- Tournaments: 96

Achievements (singles)

The ATP Challenger Series is the second tier tour for professional tennis organised by the Association of Tennis Professionals (ATP). The 1994 ATP Challenger Series calendar comprised 97 tournaments, with prize money ranging from $25,000 to $125,000.

== Schedule ==
=== January ===
Date	Country	Tournament	Prizemoney	Surface	Singles champion	Doubles champions
03.01.	New Zealand	BP National Championships	$ 50,000	Hard	(Australia) Todd Woodbridge	(Barbados) Martin Blackman (United States) Kenny Thorne
24.01.	Germany	Heilbronn Open	$ 100,000	Carpet (i)	(Germany) Markus Zoecke	(Latvia) Ģirts Dzelde (Germany) Mathias Huning
24.01.	Argentina	Mar del Plata Challenger	$ 25,000	Clay	(Spain) Albert Costa	(Argentina) Lucas Arnold Ker (Argentina) Patricio Arnold
31.01.	Germany	Lippstadt Challenger	$ 25,000	Carpet (i)	(Slovakia) Karol Kučera	(Germany) Alexander Mronz (Germany) Arne Thoms

=== February ===
Date	Country	Tournament	Prizemoney	Surface	Singles champion	Doubles champions
07.02.	France	Rennes Challenger	$ 100,000	Hard (i)	(Czech Republic) Daniel Vacek	(Sweden) Anders Järryd (Norway) Bent-Ove Pedersen
07.02.	Uruguay	Punta del Este Challenger	$ 25,000	Clay	(Argentina) Franco Davín	(Uruguay) Marcelo Filippini (Uruguay) Diego Pérez
07.02.	Germany	Volkswagen Challenger	$ 25,000	Carpet (i)	(Germany) Alexander Mronz	(United States) Rich Benson (Malaysia) Adam Malik
14.02.	France	Cherbourg Challenger	$ 50,000	Carpet (i)	(France) Thierry Guardiola	(United Kingdom) Neil Broad (South Africa) Johan de Beer
14.02.	Germany	Celle Challenger	$ 25,000	Carpet (i)	(Canada) Albert Chang	(United States) Bill Behrens (South Africa) Kirk Haygarth
21.02.	United States	Indian Wells Challenger	$ 50,000	Hard	(United States) Steve Bryan	(United States) Kelly Jones (United States) Trevor Kronemann
28.02.	Brazil	Belém Challenger	$ 50,000	Hard	(Germany) Oliver Gross	
28.02.	Germany	Garmisch-Partenkirchen Challenger	$ 25,000	Carpet (i)	(Slovakia) Karol Kučera	(Germany) Patrik Kühnen (Germany) Alexander Mronz

=== March ===
Date	Country	Tournament	Prizemoney	Surface	Singles champion	Doubles champions
21.03	Morocco	Agadir Challenger	$ 75,000	Clay	(Morocco) Younes El Aynaoui	(Czech Republic) Ctislav Doseděl (Netherlands) Mark Koevermans
28.03.	Mexico	San Luis Potosí Challenger	$ 100,000	Clay	(Venezuela) Nicolás Pereira	(Mexico) Oliver Fernández (Mexico) Leonardo Lavalle

=== April ===
Date	Country	Tournament	Prizemoney	Surface	Singles champion	Doubles champions
04.04.	Mexico	Puerto Vallarta Challenger	$ 25,000	Hard (i)	(United States) Michael Joyce	(Argentina) Pablo Albano (Venezuela) Nicolás Pereira
11.04.	Monaco	Monte Carlo Challenger	$ 50,000	Clay	(Italy) Andrea Gaudenzi	(Sweden) Henrik Holm (Sweden) Magnus Larsson
18.04.	Japan	Nagoya Challenger	$ 50,000	Hard	(Belgium) Christophe Van Garsse	(Canada) Albert Chang (Canada) Daniel Nestor
18.04.	Brazil	São Paulo Challenger	$ 25,000	Clay	(Argentina) Gabriel Markus	(Brazil) Otávio Della (Brazil) Marcelo Saliola
25.04.	Chinese Taipei	Taipei Challenger	$ 100,000	Hard	(Italy) Gianluca Pozzi	(Canada) Daniel Nestor (Venezuela) Maurice Ruah
25.04.	Colombia	Bogotá Challenger	$ 50,000	Clay	(Colombia) Mauricio Hadad	(Argentina) Lucas Arnold Ker (Ecuador) Pablo Campana
25.04.	Italy	Rome Challenger	$ 50,000	Clay	(Austria) Horst Skoff	(Egypt) Tamer El-Sawy (The Bahamas) Mark Knowles

=== May ===
Date	Country	Tournament	Prizemoney	Surface	Singles champion	Doubles champions
02.05.	Slovenia	Ljubljana Challenger	$ 125,000	Clay	(Austria) Horst Skoff	(France) Olivier Delaître (France) Jean-Philippe Fleurian
02.05.	Colombia	Cali Challenger	$ 50,000	Clay	(Colombia) Mauricio Hadad	(Portugal) João Cunha e Silva (Czech Republic) Tomáš Anzari
02.05.	Malta	Malta Challenger	$ 25,000	Clay	(Netherlands) Hendrik Jan Davids	(France) Lionel Barthez (Czech Republic) Radomír Vašek
02.05.	Philippines	Manila Challenger	$ 25,000	Hard	(Australia) Michael Tebbutt	(Canada) Albert Chang (India) Leander Paes
09.05.	Germany	Ostdeutscher Sparkassen Cup	$ 50,000	Clay	(Chile) Marcelo Ríos	(South Africa) Royce Deppe (United States) Jack Waite
09.05.	Israel	Jerusalem Challenger	$ 50,000	Hard	(Germany) Arne Thoms	(South Africa) Ellis Ferreira (Zimbabwe) Kevin Ullyett
16.05.	Hungary	Budapest Challenger I	$ 25,000	Clay	(Argentina) Hernán Gumy	(Portugal) João Cunha e Silva (Portugal) Nuno Marques
23.05.	Germany	Bochum Challenger	$ 25,000	Clay	(Argentina) Hernán Gumy	(Australia) Grant Doyle (Australia) Michael Tebbutt
23.05.	India	Bombay Challenger	$ 25,000	Hard	(India) Leander Paes	(Germany) Martin Sinner (Germany) Martin Zumpft
30.05.	Uzbekistan	Tashkent Challenger	$ 125,000	Clay	(United States) Chuck Adams	(Morocco) Karim Alami (Hungary) Sándor Noszály
30.05.	Germany	Quelle Cup	$ 100,000	Clay	(Belgium) Kris Goossens	(Czech Republic) Vojtěch Flégl (Australia) Andrew Florent
30.05.	Italy	Turin Challenger	$ 100,000	Clay	(Spain) Albert Costa	(Mexico) Leonardo Lavalle (Belgium) Libor Pimek
30.05.	Austria	Annenheim Challenger	$ 50,000	Grass	(Italy) Diego Nargiso	Not completed

=== June ===
Date	Country	Tournament	Prizemoney	Surface	Singles champion	Doubles champions
06.06.	Brazil	Campinas Challenger	$ 25,000	Clay	(France) Jérôme Golmard	(Argentina) Patricio Arnold (Argentina) Martin Stringari
06.06.	Bulgaria	Sofia Challenger	$ 25,000	Clay	(Germany) Martin Sinner	(Egypt) Tamer El-Sawy (Netherlands) Tom Kempers
06.06.	Germany	ATU Cup	$ 25,000	Clay	(Sweden) Mikael Tillström	(United States) Tommy Ho (Portugal) Nuno Marques
13.06.	Slovakia	Košice Challenger	$ 100,000	Clay	(Austria) Horst Skoff	(United States) Tommy Ho (Sweden) Mikael Tillström
20.06.	Germany	Nord/LB Open	$ 125,000	Clay	(Austria) Gilbert Schaller	(Argentina) Horacio de la Peña (Spain) Emilio Sánchez
27.06.	Portugal	Oporto Challenger	$ 125,000	Clay	(Austria) Gilbert Schaller	(Argentina) Luis Lobo (Spain) Javier Sánchez
27.06.	France	Montauban Challenger	$ 25,000	Clay	(Germany) Martin Sinner	(Germany) Martin Sinner (Netherlands) Joost Winnink
27.06.	Spain	Copa Sevilla	$ 25,000	Clay	(Spain) Gonzalo López-Fabero	(Spain) Emilio Benfele Álvarez (Spain) Pepe Imaz

=== July ===
Date	Country	Tournament	Prizemoney	Surface	Singles champion	Doubles champions
04.07.	Great Britain	Bristol Challenger	$ 50,000	Grass	(United Kingdom) Ross Matheson	(Italy) Pietro Pennisi (Germany) Alex Rădulescu
04.07.	Brazil	Campos Challenger	$ 50,000	Hard	(Mexico) Óscar Ortiz	(Argentina) Patricio Arnold (United States) Richard Matuszewski
04.07.	Germany	Wartburg Open	$ 25,000	Clay	(Germany) Lars Rehmann	(South Africa) Brendan Curry (Argentina) Luis Lobo
11.07.	United States	Aptos Challenger	$ 50,000	Hard	(Japan) Shuzo Matsuoka	(United States) Brian MacPhie (United States) Alex O'Brien
11.07.	Germany	Müller Cup	$ 50,000	Clay	(Spain) Óscar Martínez	(United States) Donald Johnson (United States) Jack Waite
11.07.	Great Britain	Newcastle Challenger	$ 50,000	Hard	(Australia) Simon Youl	(United Kingdom) Neil Broad (Australia) Simon Youl
11.07.	Belgium	Ostend Challenger	$ 25,000	Clay	(Norway) Christian Ruud	(Spain) Marcos Górriz (Belgium) Libor Pimek
18.07.	Netherlands	Scheveningen Challenger	$ 75,000	Clay	(Spain) Francisco Clavet	(Sweden) Mårten Renström (Sweden) Mikael Tillström
18.07.	United States	Montebello Challenger	$ 50,000	Hard	(Canada) Sébastien Lareau	(Canada) Sébastien Lareau (Canada) Sébastien Leblanc
18.07.	Finland	Tampere Challenger	$ 50,000	Clay	(Australia) Brent Larkham	(Slovakia) Branislav Gálik (Italy) Mario Visconti
18.07.	Germany	Oberstaufen Cup	$ 25,000	Clay	(Czech Republic) Bohdan Ulihrach	(Australia) Joshua Eagle (South Africa) Kirk Haygarth
25.07.	Poland	Poznań Challenger	$ 75,000	Clay	(Austria) Horst Skoff	(Barbados) Martin Blackman (Chile) Sergio Cortés
25.07.	United States	Winnetka Challenger	$ 50,000	Hard	(United States) Vince Spadea	(United States) Brian MacPhie (United States) David Witt
25.07.	Czech Republic	Prague Challenger	$ 25,000	Clay	(Czech Republic) Jiří Novák	(Romania) Andrei Pavel (Germany) Alex Rădulescu

=== August ===
Date	Country	Tournament	Prizemoney	Surface	Singles champion	Doubles champions
01.08.	Turkey	Istanbul Challenger	$ 125,000	Hard	(Germany) Markus Zoecke	(Germany) Alexander Mronz (Austria) Alex Antonitsch
01.08.	United States	Cincinnati Challenger	$ 50,000	Hard	(United States) Vince Spadea	(Australia) Grant Doyle (Australia) Paul Kilderry
01.08.	Brazil	Belo Horizonte Challenger	$ 25,000	Hard	(Brazil) Fabio Silberberg	(Brazil) Nelson Aerts (Brazil) Danilo Marcelino
08.08.	Spain	Open Castilla y León	$ 100,000	Hard	(France) Rodolphe Gilbert	(France) Rodolphe Gilbert (France) Stéphane Simian
08.08.	United States	Binghamton Challenger	$ 50,000	Hard	(India) Leander Paes	(United States) David DiLucia (United States) Chris Woodruff
08.08.	Brazil	Brasília Challenger	$ 50,000	Hard	(Italy) Laurence Tieleman	(United States) Bill Barber (United States) Ivan Baron
15.08.	Austria	Graz Challenger	$ 125,000	Clay	(Spain) Francisco Clavet	(Netherlands) Hendrik Jan Davids (Netherlands) Stephen Noteboom
15.08.	United States	Bronx Challenger	$ 50,000	Hard	(Spain) Alejo Mancisidor	(United Kingdom) Chris Bailey (Sweden) Lars-Anders Wahlgren
15.08.	Brazil	Fortaleza Challenger	$ 50,000	Hard	(Mexico) Óscar Ortiz	(Brazil) Otávio Della (Brazil) Marcelo Saliola
15.08.	Switzerland	Geneva Challenger	$ 50,000	Clay	(Spain) José Francisco Altur	(Argentina) Luis Lobo (Argentina) Daniel Orsanic
22.08.	Czech Republic	Pilzen Challenger	$ 25,000	Clay	(Czech Republic) Radomír Vašek	(Portugal) Emanuel Couto (Portugal) João Cunha e Silva
29.08.	Italy	Merano Challenger	$ 50,000	Clay	(France) Fabrice Santoro	(Sweden) Tomas Nydahl (Australia) Simon Youl

=== September ===
Date	Country	Tournament	Prizemoney	Surface	Singles champion	Doubles champions
05.09.	Italy	Venice Challenger	$ 100,000	Clay	(France) Fabrice Santoro	(Italy) Cristian Brandi (Italy) Federico Mordegan
05.09.	Portugal	Azores Challenger	$ 50,000	Hard	(Kenya) Paul Wekesa	(United Kingdom) Danny Sapsford (United Kingdom) Chris Wilkinson
05.09.	Brazil	Natal Challenger	$ 50,000	Clay	(Spain) Alejo Mancisidor	(Brazil) Otávio Della (Brazil) Marcelo Saliola
12.09.	South Korea	Seoul Challenger	$ 50,000	Hard	(South Africa) David Nainkin	(United States) Bill Barber (United States) Ari Nathan
12.09.	Hungary	Budapest Challenger II	$ 25,000	Clay	(Belgium) Kris Goossens	(Portugal) Emanuel Couto (Hungary) Tamás György
19.09.	Spain	Barcelona Challenger	$ 125,000	Clay	(Spain) Alberto Berasategui	(Spain) Sergio Casal (Spain) Emilio Sánchez
19.09.	Singapore	Singapore Challenger	$ 50,000	Hard	(United States) Tommy Ho	(United States) Brian Devening (Netherlands) Sander Groen
26.09.	Brazil	Recife Challenger	$ 50,000	Hard	(Italy) Daniele Musa	(Argentina) Pablo Albano (Argentina) Patricio Arnold

=== October ===
Date	Country	Tournament	Prizemoney	Surface	Singles champion	Doubles champions
03.10.	Mexico	Monterrey Challenger	$ 125,000	Hard	(Canada) Sébastien Lareau	(Canada) Daniel Nestor (United States) Kenny Thorne
03.10.	Ireland	Dublin Challenger	$ 50,000	Carpet (i)	(Germany) David Prinosil	(United Kingdom) Danny Sapsford (United Kingdom) Chris Wilkinson
03.10.	Brazil	Ribeirão Challenger	$ 25,000	Clay	(Brazil) Fernando Meligeni	(Argentina) Pablo Albano (Argentina) Patricio Arnold
10.10.	Peru	Lima Challenger	$ 50,000	Clay	(Norway) Christian Ruud	(Argentina) Gastón Etlis (Argentina) Juan Garat
10.10.	Réunion	Réunion Challenger	$ 50,000	Hard	(Italy) Laurence Tieleman	(Netherlands) Hendrik Jan Davids (Netherlands) Joost Winnink
17.10.	Ecuador	Challenger Ciudad de Guayaquil	$ 50,000	Clay	(Netherlands) Sjeng Schalken	(Portugal) João Cunha e Silva (Portugal) Nuno Marques
17.10.	Indonesia	Jakarta Challenger	$ 50,000	Hard	(India) Mahesh Bhupathi	(United Kingdom) Andrew Foster (United Kingdom) Danny Sapsford
17.10.	United States	Ponte Vedra Beach Challenger	$ 50,000	Hard	(United States) Vince Spadea	(United States) Paul Annacone (United States) Kelly Jones
24.10.	France	Brest Challenger	$ 100,000	Hard (i)	(United Kingdom) Jeremy Bates	(United States) Trevor Kronemann (Australia) David Macpherson
31.10.	Germany	Lambertz Open by STAWAG	$ 50,000	Carpet (i)	(Netherlands) Jan Siemerink	(Sweden) David Engel (Sweden) Ola Kristiansson

=== November ===
Date	Country	Tournament	Prizemoney	Surface	Singles champion	Doubles champions
14.11.	France	Nantes Challenger	$ 100,000	Carpet (i)	(United States) Jim Grabb	(France) Olivier Delaître (France) Guillaume Raoux
14.11.	United States	Glendale Challenger	$ 50,000	Hard	(Norway) Christian Ruud	(United States) Trevor Kronemann (United States) Rick Leach
21.11.	Mexico	Guadalajara Challenger	$ 100,000	Clay	(United States) Bryan Shelton	(Argentina) Juan Garat (Venezuela) Maurice Ruah
21.11.	Slovenia	Rogaška Challenger	$ 25,000	Carpet (i)	(Denmark) Frederik Fetterlein	(Czech Republic) Jan Kodeš Jr. (Czech Republic) Tomáš Anzari

=== December ===
Date	Country	Tournament	Prizemoney	Surface	Singles champion	Doubles champions
05.12.	United States	Naples Challenger	$ 50,000	Clay	(Norway) Christian Ruud	(United States) Trevor Kronemann (Australia) David Macpherson
05.12.	Australia	Perth Challenger	$ 50,000	Grass	(Slovakia) Ján Krošlák	(Australia) Ben Ellwood (Australia) Mark Philippoussis
05.12.	Brazil	São Luís Challenger	$ 50,000	Hard	(United States) Michael Joyce	(Portugal) João Cunha e Silva (The Bahamas) Roger Smith
12.12.	Andorra	Andorra Challenger	$ 125,000	Hard (i)	(Kenya) Paul Wekesa	(Sweden) Anders Järryd (Sweden) Mikael Tillström
12.12.	Germany	Cologne Challenger	$ 50,000	Hard (i)	(Germany) Karsten Braasch	(Germany) Alexander Mronz (Germany) Udo Riglewski
12.12.	Australia	Adelaide Challenger	$ 25,000	Grass	(Australia) Neil Borwick	(India) Mahesh Bhupathi (Belgium) Dick Norman
12.12.	Czech Republic	Prostějov Challenger	$ 25,000	Carpet (i)	(Slovakia) Karol Kučera	(Czech Republic) Jiří Novák (Czech Republic) Radomír Vašek
