= Maurício Lima =

Brazilian volleyball player

Personal information
- Full name: Maurício Camargo Lima
- Born: 27 January 1968 (age 58); Campinas, Brazil
- Height: 1.84 m (6 ft 0 in)
- Weight: 81 kg (179 lb)

Volleyball information
- Position: Setter
- Number: 1 (1988); 6 (1992–2004)

National team
| 1988–2004 | Brazil |
Honours
Men's volleyball
Representing Brazil
| Event | 1st | 2nd | 3rd |
|---|---|---|---|
| Olympic Games | 2 | 0 | 0 |
| World Championship | 1 | 0 | 0 |
| World Cup | 1 | 0 | 0 |
| World Grand Champions Cup | 0 | 1 | 0 |
| World League | 4 | 2 | 1 |
| Pan American Games | 0 | 1 | 1 |
| Total | 8 | 4 | 2 |
Olympic Games
| Gold medal – first place | 1992 Barcelona | Team |
| Gold medal – first place | 2004 Athens | Team |
World Championship
| Gold medal – first place | 2002 Argentina | Team |
World Cup
| Gold medal – first place | 2003 Japan | Team |
| Bronze medal – third place | 1995 Japan | |
World Grand Champions Cup
| Silver medal – second place | 2001 Japan | Team |
World League
| Gold medal – first place | 1993 São Paulo | |
| Gold medal – first place | 2001 Katowice | |
| Gold medal – first place | 2003 Madrid | |
| Gold medal – first place | 2004 Rome | Team |
| Silver medal – second place | 1995 Rio de Janeiro | |
| Silver medal – second place | 2002 Belo Horizonte | |
| Bronze medal – third place | 1994 Milan | |
Pan American Games
| Silver medal – second place | 1991 Havana | Team |
| Bronze medal – third place | 2003 Santo Domingo | Team |
CSV South American Championship
| Gold medal – first place | 1989 Curitiba | |
| Gold medal – first place | 1991 Osasco | |
| Gold medal – first place | 1993 Córdoba | |
| Gold medal – first place | 1995 Porto Alegre | |
| Gold medal – first place | 1997 Caracas | |
| Gold medal – first place | 2001 Cali | |

Maurício Camargo Lima (born 27 January 1968), known as Maurício Lima or simply Maurício, is a Brazilian former volleyball player and five-time Olympian. He won two Olympic gold medals with the Brazilian national volleyball team: the first against the Netherlands at the 1992 Summer Olympics in Barcelona and the second against Italy at the 2004 Summer Olympics in Athens. He also played at the 1988 Summer Olympics in Seoul and the 2004 Summer Olympics in Athens. He was a setter known for his strong defense.

Lima also won four FIVB World Leagues (1993, 2001, 2003 and 2004), the 2002 FIVB World Championship, and the 2003 FIVB World Cup.

In 2012, Lima was inducted into the International Volleyball Hall of Fame.

== Awards ==
=== Individual ===
- 1993 FIVB World League "Best Setter"
- 2002 FIVB World Championship "Best Setter"
