= Volleyball at the 1992 Summer Olympics =

Volleyball at the Games of the XXV Olympiad
- Venue: Palau Sant Jordi, Palau dels Esports de Barcelona; Pavelló de la Vall d'Hebron
- Dates: July 26 – August 9, 1992
- No. of events: 2
- Competitors: 231 (142 men, 89 women) from 13 nations

Volleyball has been an Olympic sport since 1964. At the 1992 Summer Olympics, it was represented by two events: men's team and women's team.

== Medal table ==
Rank	Nation	Gold	Silver	Bronze	Total
1	Brazil	1	0	0	1
1	Cuba	1	0	0	1
3	Netherlands	0	1	0	1
3	Unified Team	0	1	0	1
5	United States	0	0	2	2
Totals (5 entries)		2	2	2	6

== Medal summary ==
Event	Gold	Silver	Bronze
Men's indoor	Brazil; Amauri Ribeiro; Antônio Carlos Gouveia; Douglas Chiarotti; Giovane Gávio; Janelson Carvalho; Jorge Edson Brito; Maurício Lima; Marcelo Negrão; Paulo André Silva; André Felipe Ferreira; Talmo Oliveira; Alexandre Samuel	Netherlands; Edwin Benne; Peter Blangé; Ron Boudrie; Henk-Jan Held; Martin van der Horst; Marko Klok; Olof van der Meulen; Jan Posthuma; Avital Selinger; Martin Teffer; Ronald Zoodsma; Ron Zwerver	United States; Nick Becker; Carlos Briceno; Bob Ctvrtlik; Scott Fortune; Dan Greenbaum; Brent Hilliard; Bryan Ivie; Douglas Partie; Bob Samuelson; Eric Sato; Jeff Stork; Steve Timmons
Women's indoor	Cuba; Regla Bell; Mercedes Calderón; Magaly Carvajal; Marlenis Costa; Idalmis Gato; Lilia Izquierdo; Norka Latamblet; Mireya Luis; Tania Ortiz; Raisa O'Farril; Regla Torres; Ana Ibis Fernandez	Unified Team; Valentina Ogienko; Natalya Morozova; Marina Nikoulina; Elena Tyurina; Irina Ilchenko; Tatyana Sidorenko; Tatiana Menchova; Yevgeniya Artamonova; Galina Lebedeva; Svetlana Vassilevskaia; Elena Chebukina; Svetlana Koritova	United States; Liane Sato; Paula Weishoff; Yoko Zetterlund; Elaina Oden; Kimberley Oden; Tonya Williams; Caren Kemner; Ruth Lawanson; Tammy Liley; Janet Cobbs; Tara Cross-Battle; Lori Endicott
