= Paulo Silva (volleyball) =

Brazilian volleyball player (born 1963)

Personal information
- Full name: Paulo André Jukoski da Silva
- Nickname: Paulão
- Born: December 24, 1963 (age 62); Porto Alegre, Brazil
- Height: 201 cm (6 ft 7 in)

Volleyball information
- Position: Middle blocker
- Number: 5

National team
1987–1997	Brazil
Honours
Men's volleyball
Representing Brazil
Olympic Games
Gold medal – first place	1992 Barcelona	Team
Pan American Games
Bronze medal – third place	1987 Indianapolis	Team
CSV South American Championship
Gold medal – first place	1991 Osasco
Gold medal – first place	1993 Córdoba

Paulo André Jukoski da Silva (born December 24, 1963), known as Paulão, is a Brazilian former volleyball player who competed in the 1988 Summer Olympics, the 1992 Summer Olympics, and the 1996 Summer Olympics.

Paulão was born in Porto Alegre.

In 1988, Paulão was part of the Brazilian team that finished fourth in the Olympic tournament. He played all seven matches.

Four years later, Paulão won the gold medal with the Brazilian team in the 1992 Olympic tournament. He played all eight matches.

At the 1996 Games, Paulão was a member of the Brazilian team that finished fifth in the Olympic tournament. He played seven matches.
