= Janelson Carvalho =

Brazilian volleyball player (born 1969)

Personal information
- Full name: Janelson dos Santos Carvalho
- Born: 24 March 1969 (age 57); Porto Alegre, Brazil
- Height: 1.95 cm (1 in)

Volleyball information
- Position: Opposite
- Number: 7

National team
1989–1995	Brazil
Honours
Men's volleyball
Representing Brazil
Olympic Games
Gold medal – first place	1992 Barcelona	Team
Pan American Games
Silver medal – second place	1991 Havana	Team
CSV South American Championship
Gold medal – first place	1989 Curitiba
Gold medal – first place	1991 Osasco
Gold medal – first place	1993 Córdoba

Janelson dos Santos Carvalho (born 24 March 1969), known as Janelson, is a Brazilian former volleyball player who competed in the 1992 Summer Olympics in Barcelona.

In 1992, Janelson was part of the Brazilian team that won the gold medal in the Olympic tournament. He played two matches.
