= Antônio Gouveia =

Brazilian volleyball player (born 1965)

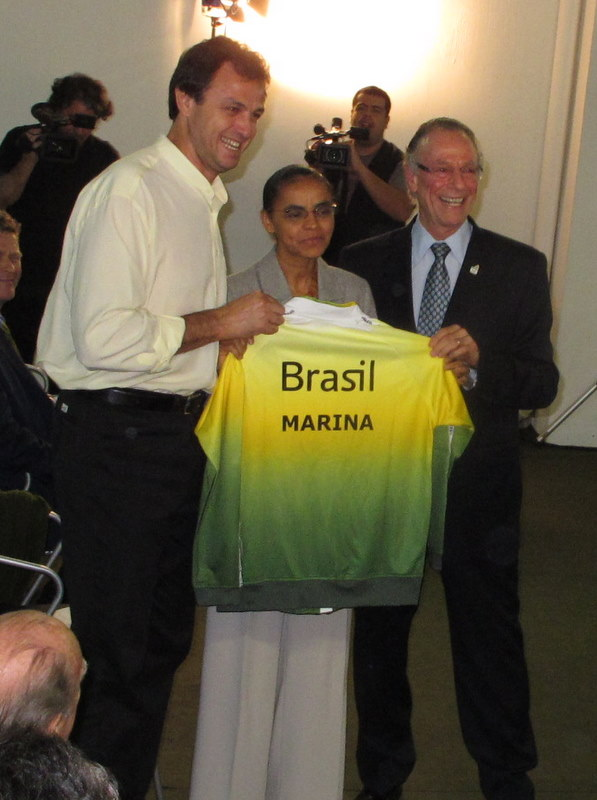

Personal information
- Full name: Antônio Carlos Aguilar Gouveia
- Nickname: Carlão
- Born: 20 April 1965 (age 61); Rio Branco, Acre, Brazil
- Height: 1.98 m (6 ft 6 in)

Volleyball information
- Position: Middle blocker
- Number: 9

National team
1985–2000	Brazil
Honours
Men's volleyball
Representing Brazil
Olympic Games
Gold medal – first place	1992 Barcelona	Team
FIVB World Cup
Bronze medal – third place	1995 Japan
World League
Gold medal – first place	1993 São Paulo
Silver medal – second place	1995 Rio de Janeiro
Bronze medal – third place	1990 Osaka
Bronze medal – third place	1994 Milan
Bronze medal – third place	2000 Rotterdam
Pan American Games
Silver medal – second place	1991 Havana	Team
Bronze medal – third place	1987 Indianapolis	Team
South American Championship
Gold medal – first place	1987 Uruguay
Gold medal – first place	1989 Brazil
Gold medal – first place	1991 Brazil
Gold medal – first place	1993 Argentina
Gold medal – first place	1995 Brazil
Gold medal – first place	1997 Venezuela
Gold medal – first place	1999 Argentina

Antônio Carlos Aguilar Gouveia (born 20 April 1965), known as Carlão, is a Brazilian former volleyball player who competed in the 1988 Summer Olympics in Seoul and the 1992 Summer Olympics in Barcelona.

In 1988, Carlão was part of the Brazilian team that finished fourth in the Olympic tournament. He played all seven matches.

Four years later, in 1992, Carlão won the gold medal with the Brazilian team in the 1992 Olympic tournament. He played all eight matches.
