= 1993 Hellmann's Cup – Singles =

Singles
- 1993 Hellmann's Cup

Final
- Champion: (Argentina) Javier Frana
- Runner-up: (Spain) Emilio Sánchez
- Score: 7–5, 3–6, 6–3

Details
- Draw: 32
- Seeds: 8

Events
Singles	Doubles
Chile Open	· 1994 →

Javier Frana defeated Emilio Sánchez 7–5, 3–6, 6–3 to win the 1993 Movistar Open singles competition.

== Seeds ==
1. (Peru) Jaime Yzaga (semifinals)
2. (Australia) Richard Fromberg (second round, retired)
3. (Spain) Alberto Berasategui (second round)
4. (Brazil) Luiz Mattar (second round)
5. (Spain) Emilio Sánchez (final)
6. (France) Fabrice Santoro (first round)
7. (Morocco) Younes El Aynaoui (second round)
8. (Spain) Àlex Corretja (second round)

== Draw ==
=== Key ===
- Q = Qualifier
- WC = Wild card
- LL = Lucky loser
- Alt = Alternate
- ITF = ITF entry
- PR = Protected ranking
- SR = Special ranking
- SE = Special exempt
- JE = Junior exempt
- JR = Junior Accelerator Programme entrant
- CO = College Accelerator Programme entrant
- NG = Next Gen Accelerator Program entrant
- w/o = Walkover
- r = Retired
- d = Defaulted

=== Finals ===
Semifinals
1	(Peru) Jaime Yzaga	1	7^{7}	5
5	(Spain) Emilio Sánchez	6	6^{5}	7
(Argentina) Javier Frana	6	3	6
(Uruguay) Marcelo Filippini	4	6	3

Final
5	(Spain) Emilio Sánchez	5	6	3
(Argentina) Javier Frana	7	3	6

=== Top half ===
First round
1	(Peru) J Yzaga	6	4	6
(Czech Republic) S Doseděl	2	6	3
(Argentina) G Markus	7	7
(France) J Fleurian	5	5
(Spain) J Arrese	3	6	5
(Italy) R Furlan	6	1	7
(Austria) G Schaller	7^{7}	2	3
7	(Morocco) Y El Aynaoui	6^{5}	6	6
3	(Spain) A Berasategui	6	4	6
(Brazil) J Oncins	4	6	3
(Argentina) F Davín	6	4	3
Q	(Spain) Á Costa	1	6	6
Q	(Sweden) C Allgårdh	6^{3}	4
Q	(Argentina) M Stringari	7^{7}	6
WC	(Chile) F Rivera	3	4
5	(Spain) E Sánchez	6	6

Second round
1	(Peru) J Yzaga	7^{9}	7^{7}
(Argentina) G Markus	6^{7}	6^{3}
(Italy) R Furlan	6	6
7	(Morocco) Y El Aynaoui	4	3
3	(Spain) A Berasategui	6	3	6^{3}
Q	(Spain) Á Costa	4	6	7^{7}
Q	(Argentina) M Stringari	2	4
5	(Spain) E Sánchez	6	6

Quarterfinals
1	(Peru) J Yzaga	7	7^{8}
(Italy) R Furlan	5	6^{6}
Q	(Spain) Á Costa	3	6^{4}
5	(Spain) E Sánchez	6	7^{7}

Semifinals
1	(Peru) J Yzaga	1	7^{7}	5
5	(Spain) E Sánchez	6	6^{5}	7

=== Bottom half ===
First round
6	(France) F Santoro	2	6	2
(Czech Republic) D Rikl	6	3	6
(Spain) J Altur	1	3
(Argentina) J Frana	6	6
(Argentina) D Orsanic	3	3
(Argentina) H de la Peña	6	6
(Argentina) A Mancini	2	3
WC/4	(Brazil) L Mattar	6	6
8	(Spain) À Corretja	7^{7}	6
Q	(Argentina) J Garat	6^{4}	3
(Uruguay) M Filippini	0	6	6
(Spain) T Carbonell	6	2	2
(Spain) J Burillo	6	6
(Spain) F Clavet	4	2
WC	(Chile) S Cortés	6^{4}	6^{2}
2	(Australia) R Fromberg	7^{7}	7^{7}

Second round
(Czech Republic) D Rikl	4	6^{4}
(Argentina) J Frana	6	7^{7}
(Argentina) H de la Peña	3	6	6
WC/4	(Brazil) L Mattar	6	3	4
8	(Spain) À Corretja	6^{5}	6^{2}
(Uruguay) M Filippini	7^{7}	7^{7}
(Spain) J Burillo	6	1
2	(Australia) R Fromberg	1	0^{r}

Quarterfinals
(Argentina) J Frana	3	6	6
(Argentina) H de la Peña	6	3	2
(Uruguay) M Filippini	6	7^{8}
(Spain) J Burillo	4	6^{6}

Semifinals
(Argentina) J Frana	6	3	6
(Uruguay) M Filippini	4	6	3
