= 1993 Hellmann's Cup – Doubles =

Doubles
- 1993 Hellmann's Cup

Final
- Champions: (United States) Mike Bauer; (Czech Republic) David Rikl
- Runners-up: (Sweden) Christer Allgårdh; (United States) Brian Devening
- Score: 7–6, 6–4

Events
Singles	Doubles
Chile Open	· 1994 →

This was the first edition of the event.

Mike Bauer and David Rikl won the title, defeating Christer Allgårdh and Brian Devening 7–6, 6–4 in the final.

== Seeds ==
1. (Spain) Sergio Casal / (Spain) Emilio Sánchez (first round)
2. (Netherlands) Mark Koevermans / (United States) Greg Van Emburgh (first round)
3. (Spain) Tomás Carbonell / (South Africa) Byron Talbot (first round)
4. (Argentina) Pablo Albano / (Argentina) Javier Frana (semifinals)

== Draw ==
=== Key ===
- Q = Qualifier
- WC = Wild card
- LL = Lucky loser
- Alt = Alternate
- ITF = ITF entry
- PR = Protected ranking
- SR = Special ranking
- SE = Special exempt
- JE = Junior exempt
- JR = Junior Accelerator Programme entrant
- CO = College Accelerator Programme entrant
- NG = Next Gen Accelerator Program entrant
- w/o = Walkover
- r = Retired
- d = Defaulted

=== Draw ===
First round

Quarterfinals

Semifinals

Final

1
- (Spain) S Casal
- (Spain) E Sánchez
3
3

- (Sweden) C Allgårdh
- (United States) B Devening
6
6

- (Sweden) C Allgårdh
- (United States) B Devening
6
7

Q
- (Argentina) F Davín
- (Argentina) G Markus
3
4

- (United States) D Johnson
- (United States) J Sullivan
3
6

- (United States) D Johnson
- (United States) J Sullivan
6
6

- (Sweden) C Allgårdh
- (United States) B Devening
7
2
6

3
- (Spain) T Carbonell
- (South Africa) B Talbot
6
5
6

- (France) J-P Fleurian
- (South Africa) B Haygarth
6
6
2

WC
- (Chile) S Cortés
- (Chile) F Rivera
4
7
7

WC
- (Chile) S Cortés
- (Chile) F Rivera
6
3
3

- (France) J-P Fleurian
- (South Africa) B Haygarth
6
6

- (France) J-P Fleurian
- (South Africa) B Haygarth
3
6
6

- (Argentina) J Garat
- (Argentina) R Saad
4
4

- (Sweden) C Allgårdh
- (United States) B Devening
6
4

- (Argentina) H de la Peña
- (Uruguay) D Pérez
2
4

- (United States) M Bauer
- (Czech Republic) D Rikl
7
6

- (United States) F Montana
- (United States) J Pugh
6
6

- (United States) F Montana
- (United States) J Pugh
6
3

WC
- (Chile) Robinson Gamonal
- (Chile) Francisco Ruiz
3
2

4
- (Argentina) P Albano
- (Argentina) J Frana
7
6

4
- (Argentina) P Albano
- (Argentina) J Frana
6
6

4
- (Argentina) P Albano
- (Argentina) J Frana
3
3

- (Brazil) L Mattar
- (Brazil) J Oncins
7
6
3

- (United States) M Bauer
- (Czech Republic) D Rikl
6
6

- (United States) M Bauer
- (Czech Republic) D Rikl
6
7
6

- (United States) M Bauer
- (Czech Republic) D Rikl
w/o

- (Italy) C Brandi
- (Spain) F Roig
6
6

- (Italy) C Brandi
- (Spain) F Roig

2
- (Netherlands) M Koevermans
- (United States) G Van Emburgh
4
4
