= Marcelo Negrão =

Brazilian volleyball player (born 1972)

Personal information
- Full name: Marcelo Teles Negrão
- Born: 10 October 1972 (age 54); São Paulo, Brazil
- Height: 198 cm (6 ft 6 in)
- Weight: 90 kg (198 lb)

Volleyball information
- Position: Opposite
- Number: 1 (national team)

Career
Years	Teams
1990; 1994	Banespa; Telesp S. Paolo

National team
1990–2001	Brazil
Honours
Men's volleyball
Representing Brazil
Olympic Games
Gold medal – first place	1992 Barcelona	Team
FIVB World Cup
Bronze medal – third place	1995 Japan
Pan American Games
Silver medal – second place	1991 Havana	Team
Silver medal – second place	1999 Winnipeg	Team
CSV South American Championship
Gold medal – first place	1991 Osasco
Gold medal – first place	1993 Córdoba
Gold medal – first place	1995 Porto Alegre
Gold medal – first place	1999 Córdoba

Marcelo Teles Negrão (born 10 October 1972) is a Brazilian former volleyball player who was a member of the Brazil men's national volleyball team that won the gold medal at the 1992 Summer Olympics in Barcelona by defeating the Netherlands in the final. Negrão also competed at the 1996 Summer Olympics in Atlanta. He played beach volleyball.

== Individual awards ==
- 1992 FIVB World League "Best Spiker"
- 1994 FIVB Volleyball Men's World Championship "Best Server"
- 1992 Olympics "MVP"

== Clubs ==
- Banespa (1990)
- Telesp S. Paolo (1994)
