= Talmo Oliveira =

Brazilian volleyball player (born 1969)

Personal information
- Full name: Talmo Curto de Oliveira
- Born: October 10, 1969 (age 57); Itabira, Brazil
- Height: 194 cm (6 ft 4 in)

Volleyball information
- Position: Setter
- Number: 10
Honours
Men's volleyball
Representing Brazil
Olympic Games
Gold medal – first place	1992 Barcelona	Team
Pan American Games
Silver medal – second place	1991 Havana	Team
CSV South American Championship
Gold medal – first place	1991 Osasco
Gold medal – first place	1993 Córdoba

Talmo Curto de Oliveira (born October 10, 1969), known as Talmo, is a Brazilian retired volleyball player. He was a member of the Brazilian national volleyball team that won the gold medal at the 1992 Summer Olympics in Barcelona, defeating the Netherlands (3-0) in the final. He played as a setter.
