= André Ferreira (volleyball) =

Brazilian volleyball player (1964–2024)

Personal information
- Full name: André Felipe Falbo Ferreira
- Nickname: Pampa
- Born: 24 November 1964; Recife, Pernambuco, Brazil
- Died: 7 June 2024 (aged 59); São Paulo, Brazil
- Height: 1.94 m (6 ft 4 in)

Volleyball information
- Position: Opposite
- Number: 12

National team
1986–1993	Brazil
Honours
Men's volleyball
Representing Brazil
Olympic Games
Gold medal – first place	1992 Barcelona	Team
World League
Gold medal – first place	1993 Brazil
Pan American Games
Silver medal – second place	1991 Havana	Team
CSV South American Championship
Gold medal – first place	1989 Curitiba
Gold medal – first place	1991 Osasco
Gold medal – first place	1993 Córdoba

André Felipe Falbo Ferreira (24 November 1964 – 7 June 2024), known as Pampa, was a Brazilian volleyball player who competed in the 1988 Summer Olympics in Seoul and the 1992 Summer Olympics in Barcelona.

In 1988, Ferreira was part of the Brazilian team that finished fourth in the Olympic tournament. He played five matches.

Four years later, Ferreira won the gold medal with the Brazilian team in the Olympic tournament. He played two matches.

Ferreira died from lymphoma in São Paulo, on 7 June 2024, at the age of 59.
