= Tande =

Brazilian volleyball player (born 1970)

Alexandre Samuel
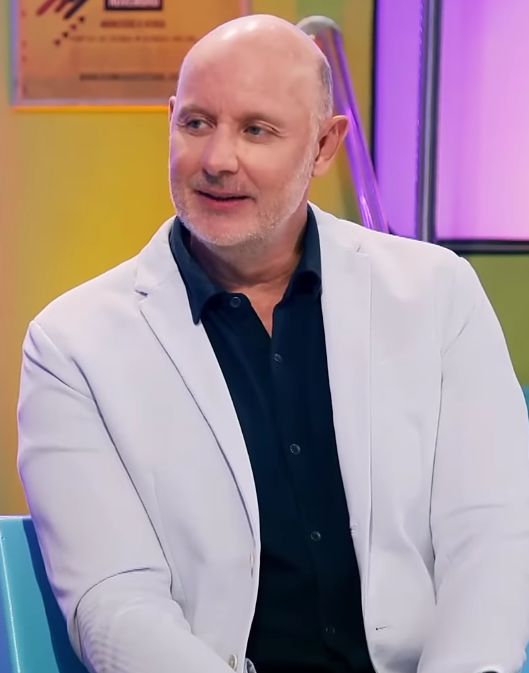

Personal information
- Full name: Alexandre Ramos Samuel
- Nickname: Tande
- Born: March 20, 1970 (age 56); Resende, Rio de Janeiro, Brazil
- Height: 200 cm (6 ft 7 in)
- Weight: 86 kg (190 lb)

Volleyball information
- Position: Outside hitter
- Number: 14

National team
1989–2000	Brazil
Honours
Men's volleyball
Representing Brazil
Olympic Games
Gold medal – first place	1992 Barcelona	Team
FIVB World Cup
Bronze medal – third place	1995 Japan
World League
Gold medal – first place	1993 São Paulo
Silver medal – second place	1995 Rio de Janeiro
Bronze medal – third place	1990 Osaka
Bronze medal – third place	1994 Milan
Pan American Games
Silver medal – second place	1991 Havana	Team
South American Championship
Gold medal – first place	1989 Brazil
Gold medal – first place	1991 Brazil
Gold medal – first place	1993 Argentina
Gold medal – first place	1995 Brazil

Alexandre Ramos Samuel (born 20 March 1970), also known as Tande, is a Brazilian former volleyball player. He began playing volleyball for the Botafogo team when he was 12 years old.

Tande won a gold medal with the Brazilian national volleyball team at the 1992 Summer Olympics in Barcelona. In 1995, he finished in fifth place with the Brazilian team at the 1996 Summer Olympics in Atlanta.

Tande won a silver medal with Brazil at the 1991 Pan American Games in Havana.

== Beach volleyball ==
In 1997, Tande switched to beach volleyball and partnered with his former teammate, Giovane Gavio.

Sporting positions
Preceded by Zé Marco de Melo and Ricardo Santos (BRA)	Men's FIVB Beach Volley World Tour Winner alongside (Brazil) Emanuel Rego; 2001	Succeeded by Martín Conde and Mariano Baracetti (ARG)
