= Swimming at the 1991 Pan American Games – Men's 100 metre butterfly =

Men's 100 metre butterfly at the 1991 Pan American Games
- Venue: -
- Dates: August 13 (preliminaries and finals)
- Competitors: from - nations

Medalists
Gold medal	Anthony Nesty	Suriname
Silver medal	Mike Merrell	United States
Bronze medal	Eduardo Piccinini	Brazil

The men's 100 metre butterfly competition of the swimming events at the 1991 Pan American Games took place on 13 August. The last Pan American Games champion was Anthony Nesty of Suriname.

This race consisted of two lengths of the pool, all in butterfly.

== Results ==
All times are in minutes and seconds.

KEY:	q	Fastest non-qualifiers	Q	Qualified	GR	Games record	NR	National record	PB	Personal best	SB	Seasonal best

=== Final ===
The final was held on August 13.

Rank	Name	Nationality	Time	Notes
1st place, gold medalist(s)	Anthony Nesty	Suriname	53.45	GR
2nd place, silver medalist(s)	Mike Merrell	United States	54.60	
3rd place, bronze medalist(s)	Eduardo Piccinini	Brazil	55.00	
4	Jim Harvey	United States	55.04	
5	Jose Menéndez	Cuba	55.84	
6	Diego Perdomo	Colombia	56.02	
7	Emmanuel Nascimento	Brazil	56.17	
8	Giovanni Linscheer	Suriname	56.21	
