= 1995 Hellmann's Cup =

- Date: 23–30 October
- Edition: 3rd
- Category: World Series
- Draw: 32S / 16D
- Prize money: $203,750
- Surface: Clay / outdoor
- Location: Santiago, Chile

Champions

Singles
- (Czech Republic) Slava Doseděl

Doubles
- (Czech Republic) Jiří Novák / (Czech Republic) David Rikl
- Chile Open

The 1995 Hellmann's Cup was a men's tennis tournament held in Santiago, Chile and played on outdoor clay courts. The tournament was part of the ATP World Series circuit of the 1995 ATP Tour. It was the third edition of the tournament and was held from 23 October through 30 October. Unseeded Slava Doseděl won the singles title.

== Finals ==
=== Singles ===
(Czech Republic) Slava Doseděl defeated (Chile) Marcelo Ríos 7–6^{(7–3)}, 6–3

- It was Doseděl 's only title of the year, and the 1st of his career.

=== Doubles ===
(Czech Republic) Jiří Novák / (Czech Republic) David Rikl defeated (United States) Shelby Cannon / (United States) Francisco Montana, 6–4, 4–6, 6–1

- It was Novak's 2nd title of the year and the 2nd of his career. It was Rikl's 2nd title of the year and the 9th of his career.
