= Swimming at the 1991 Pan American Games – Men's 200 metre backstroke =

Men's 200 metre backstroke at the 1991 Pan American Games
- Venue: -
- Dates: August 14 (preliminaries and finals)
- Competitors: from - nations

Medalists
Gold medal	Rogério Romero	Brazil
Silver medal	Dan Veatch	United States
Bronze medal	Manuel Guzmán	Puerto Rico

The men's 200 metre backstroke competition of the swimming events at the 1991 Pan American Games took place on 14 August. The last Pan American Games champion was Mike O'Brien of US.

This race consisted of four lengths of the pool, all in backstroke.

Rogério Romero won the gold medal, breaking a string of 5 U.S. titles in a row. Before him, only one other non-American had won the race; the Canadian Ralph Hutton won in 1967 in the first edition of the Games in which this race was held.

== Results ==
All times are in minutes and seconds.

KEY:	q	Fastest non-qualifiers	Q	Qualified	GR	Games record	NR	National record	PB	Personal best	SB	Seasonal best

=== Final ===
The final was held on August 14.

Rank	Name	Nationality	Time	Notes
1st place, gold medalist(s)	Rogério Romero	Brazil	2:01.07	
2nd place, silver medalist(s)	Dan Veatch	United States	2:01.14	
3rd place, bronze medalist(s)	Manuel Guzmán	Puerto Rico	2:01.68	
4	Brad Bridgewater	United States	2:01.70	
5	Rodolfo Falcón	Cuba	2:02.87	
6	Paul Szekula	Canada	2:04.83	
7	Stephen Hulford	Canada	2:05.60	
8	Tomas Bisono	Dominican Republic	2:07.44	
