= 1995 Hellmann's Cup – Singles =

Singles
- 1995 Hellmann's Cup

Final
- Champion: (Czech Republic) Sláva Doseděl
- Runner-up: (Chile) Marcelo Ríos
- Score: 7–6^{(7–3)}, 6–3

Details
- Draw: 32 (3WC/4Q)
- Seeds: 8

Events
| Singles | Doubles |
| ← 1994 · | Chile Open | · 1996 → |

Alberto Berasategui was the defending champion, but chose to compete at Stuttgart during the same week.

Sláva Doseděl won the title, defeating Marcelo Ríos 7–6^{(7–3)}, 6–3 in the final.

== Seeds ==
1. (Austria) Gilbert Schaller (first round)
2. (Spain) Álbert Costa (semifinals)
3. (Chile) Marcelo Ríos (final)
4. (Spain) Francisco Clavet (first round)
5. (Spain) Javier Sánchez (first round)
6. (Czech Republic) Bohdan Ulihrach (first round)
7. (Spain) Àlex Corretja (quarterfinals)
8. (Netherlands) Sjeng Schalken (quarterfinals)

== Draw ==
=== Key ===
- Q = Qualifier
- WC = Wild card
- LL = Lucky loser
- Alt = Alternate
- ITF = ITF entry
- PR = Protected ranking
- SR = Special ranking
- SE = Special exempt
- JE = Junior exempt
- JR = Junior Accelerator Programme entrant
- CO = College Accelerator Programme entrant
- NG = Next Gen Accelerator Program entrant
- w/o = Walkover
- r = Retired
- d = Defaulted

=== Finals ===
Semifinals
(Argentina) Hernán Gumy | 6 | 4 | 2
3 | (Chile) Marcelo Ríos | 3 | 6 | 6
(Czech Republic) Sláva Doseděl | 6 | 6
2 | (Spain) Albert Costa | 4 | 0

Final
3 | (Chile) Marcelo Ríos | 6^{3} | 3
(Czech Republic) Sláva Doseděl | 7^{7} | 6

=== Top half ===
First round
1 | (Austria) G Schaller | 6 | 6
(Brazil) F Meligeni | 4 | 3
(Argentina) H Gumy | 6^{2} | 6 | 6
(Norway) C Ruud | 7^{7} | 3 | 0
(Czech Republic) J Novák | 3 | 2
(Spain) T Carbonell | 6 | 6
(Portugal) N Marques | 6 | 5 | 3
7 | (Spain) À Corretja | 4 | 7 | 6
3 | (Chile) M Ríos | 7^{7} | 7
WC | (Spain) J Burillo | 6^{2} | 5
(Morocco) K Alami | 6 | 4 | 6
(Argentina) F Davín | 3 | 6 | 4
WC | (Peru) J Yzaga | 6 | 2 | 6
Q | (France) F Fontang | 2 | 6 | 2
(Czech Republic) D Rikl | 7 | 6
5 | (Spain) J Sánchez | 5 | 3

Second round
1 | (Austria) G Schaller | 4 | 6^{0}
(Argentina) H Gumy | 6 | 7^{7}
(Spain) T Carbonell | 5 | 5
7 | (Spain) À Corretja | 7 | 7
3 | (Chile) M Ríos | 6 | 6
(Morocco) K Alami | 1 | 2
WC | (Peru) J Yzaga | 1 | 1
(Czech Republic) D Rikl | 6 | 6

Quarterfinals
(Argentina) H Gumy | 7^{7} | 6
7 | (Spain) À Corretja | 6^{2} | 1
3 | (Chile) M Ríos | 6 | 4 | 6
(Czech Republic) D Rikl | 2 | 6 | 4

Semifinals
(Argentina) H Gumy | 6 | 4 | 2
3 | (Chile) M Ríos | 3 | 6 | 6

=== Bottom half ===
First round
6 | (Czech Republic) B Ulihrach | 2 | 6 | 3
(France) F Santoro | 6 | 2 | 6
(Uruguay) M Filippini | 1 | 6^{6}
(Colombia) M Hadad | 6 | 7^{8}
(Czech Republic) S Doseděl | 6 | 6
WC | (Chile) G Silberstein | 3 | 3
Q | (Brazil) J Oncins | 6 | 6
4 | (Spain) F Clavet | 3 | 2
8 | (Netherlands) S Schalken | 5 | 6 | 6
(United States) V Spadea | 7 | 4 | 4
(Venezuela) N Pereira | 6 | 7
(Spain) E Sánchez | 4 | 5
Q | (Romania) R Sabău | 7^{9} | 6
Q | (Spain) C Moyà | 6^{7} | 1
(Spain) J Arrese | 4 | 6^{4}
2 | (Spain) A Costa | 6 | 7^{7}

Second round
(France) F Santoro | 6 | 3 | 2
(Colombia) M Hadad | 4 | 6 | 6
(Czech Republic) S Doseděl | 6 | 7
Q | (Brazil) J Oncins | 2 | 5
8 | (Netherlands) S Schalken | 6 | 6
(Venezuela) N Pereira | 1 | 4
Q | (Romania) R Sabău | 2 | 3
2 | (Spain) A Costa | 6 | 6

Quarterfinals
(Colombia) M Hadad | 7 | 5 | 3
(Czech Republic) S Doseděl | 5 | 7 | 6
8 | (Netherlands) S Schalken | 7^{7} | 5 | 3
2 | (Spain) A Costa | 6^{1} | 7 | 6

Semifinals
(Czech Republic) S Doseděl | 6 | 6
2 | (Spain) A Costa | 4 | 0
