= 1994 Hellmann's Cup – Singles =

Singles
- 1994 Hellmann's Cup

Final
- Champion: (Spain) Alberto Berasategui
- Runner-up: (Spain) Francisco Clavet
- Score: 6–3, 6–4

Details
- Draw: 32
- Seeds: 8

Events
Singles	Doubles
← 1993 ·	Chile Open	· 1995 →

Javier Frana was the defending champion but lost in the quarterfinals to Alberto Berasategui.

Berasategui won in the final 6–3, 6–4 against Francisco Clavet.

== Seeds ==
1. (Spain) Alberto Berasategui (champion)
2. (Spain) Àlex Corretja (semifinals)
3. (Czech Republic) Slava Doseděl (semifinals)
4. (Czech Republic) Karel Nováček (second round)
5. (Austria) Gilbert Schaller (second round)
6. (Spain) Álbert Costa (first round)
7. (Argentina) Franco Davín (quarterfinals)
8. (Spain) Tomás Carbonell (second round)

== Draw ==
=== Key ===
- Q = Qualifier
- WC = Wild card
- LL = Lucky loser
- Alt = Alternate
- ITF = ITF entry
- PR = Protected ranking
- SR = Special ranking
- SE = Special exempt
- JE = Junior exempt
- JR = Junior Accelerator Programme entrant
- CO = College Accelerator Programme entrant
- NG = Next Gen Accelerator Program entrant
- w/o = Walkover
- r = Retired
- d = Defaulted

=== Finals ===
Semifinals
1	(Spain) Alberto Berasategui	6	3	6
3	(Czech Republic) Slava Doseděl	4	6	1
(Spain) Francisco Clavet	2	7	6
2	(Spain) Àlex Corretja	6	5	4

Final
1	(Spain) Alberto Berasategui	6	6
(Spain) Francisco Clavet	3	4

=== Top half ===
First round
1	(Spain) A Berasategui	6	3	6
(Chile) M Ríos	4	6	1
Q	(Romania) A Voinea	2	0
(Spain) J Burillo	6	6
(Argentina) J Frana	6	6
(Germany) O Gross	2	4
(Sweden) M Wilander	2	6	0
8	(Spain) T Carbonell	6	3	6
3	(Czech Republic) S Doseděl	6	6
(Spain) Ó Martínez	2	4
Q	(Argentina) M Rodríguez	4	6^{2}
Q	(Argentina) C Miniussi	6	7^{7}
(Spain) A Mancisidor	2	4
WC	(Spain) J Arrese	6	6
(Morocco) Y El Aynaoui	3	2
5	(Austria) G Schaller	6	6

Second round
1	(Spain) A Berasategui	6	6
(Spain) J Burillo	2	1
(Argentina) J Frana	5	6	6
8	(Spain) T Carbonell	7	2	4
3	(Czech Republic) S Doseděl	6	6
Q	(Argentina) C Miniussi	4	4
WC	(Spain) J Arrese	6	6
5	(Austria) G Schaller	4	3

Quarterfinals
1	(Spain) A Berasategui	6	7
(Argentina) J Frana	4	5
3	(Czech Republic) S Doseděl	7^{7}	6
WC	(Spain) J Arrese	6^{3}	1

Semifinals
1	(Spain) A Berasategui	6	3	6
3	(Czech Republic) S Doseděl	4	6	1

=== Bottom half ===
First round
6	(Spain) Á Costa	2	4
(Argentina) G Markus	6	6
(Spain) F Clavet	7	6
(Morocco) K Alami	5	4
WC	(Chile) G Silberstein	4	2
(Brazil) F Meligeni	6	6
(United States) V Spadea	2	7	2
4	(Czech Republic) K Nováček	6	5	6
7	(Argentina) F Davín	6	6
(Venezuela) M Ruah	2	3
WC	(Chile) S Cortés	3	6	6^{0}
(Uruguay) M Filippini	6	1	7^{7}
(Spain) E Sánchez	6	6
Q	(France) F Fontang	1	2
(Brazil) L Mattar	3	3
2	(Spain) À Corretja	6	6

Second round
(Argentina) G Markus	4	3
(Spain) F Clavet	6	6
(Brazil) F Meligeni	4	6	6
4	(Czech Republic) K Nováček	6	4	2
7	(Argentina) F Davín	6	6
(Uruguay) M Filippini	3	1
(Spain) E Sánchez	6	6^{2}	3
2	(Spain) À Corretja	1	7^{7}	6

Quarterfinals
(Spain) F Clavet	6	6
(Brazil) F Meligeni	4	4
7	(Argentina) F Davín	5	4
2	(Spain) À Corretja	7	6

Semifinals
(Spain) F Clavet	2	7	6
2	(Spain) À Corretja	6	5	4
