= Tennis at the 1991 Pan American Games =

- Dates: August 6–16

Seven tennis events were held at the 1991 Pan American Games in Havana, Cuba, from August 6–16, including a team event for the first time. 88 athletes from 25 nations participated.

== Medalists ==
=== By Country ===
(Host nation in bold.)

Rank	Nation	Gold	Silver	Bronze	Total
1	United States (USA)	3	1	0	4
2	Brazil (BRA)	2	2	3	7
3	Mexico (MEX)	1	1	1	3
3	Puerto Rico (PUR)	1	1	1	3
5	Dominican Republic (DOM)	0	1	1	2
6	Venezuela (VEN)	0	1	0	1
7	Cuba (CUB)	0	0	4	4
8	Chile (CHI)	0	0	3	3
9	Peru (PER)	0	0	1	1
Totals (9 entries)		7	7	14	28

=== Men's singles ===
Gold:	(Mexico) **Luis-Enrique Herrera**
Silver:	(United States) David DiLucia
Bronze:	(Brazil) Marcelo Saliola
Bronze:	(Cuba) Juan Pino

=== Women's singles ===
Gold:	(United States) **Pam Shriver**
Silver:	(Dominican Republic) Joelle Schad
Bronze:	(Brazil) Andrea Vieira
Bronze:	(Brazil) Claudia Chabalgoity

=== Men's doubles ===
Gold:	(Puerto Rico) **Miguel Nido & Joey Rive**
Silver:	(Mexico) Agustín Moreno & Fernando Pérez Pascal
Bronze:	(Cuba) Juan Pino & Mario Tabares
Bronze:	(Peru) Patrick Baumeler & Américo Venero

=== Women's doubles ===
Gold:	(United States) **Donna Faber & Pam Shriver**
Silver:	(Brazil) **Andrea Vieira & Cláudia Chabalgoity**
Bronze:	(Chile)
Bronze:	(Mexico)

=== Mixed doubles ===
Gold:	(United States) **David DiLucia & Pam Shriver**
Silver:	(Brazil) **William Kyriakos & Cláudia Chabalgoity**
Bronze:	(Dominican Republic) Rafael Moreno & Joelle Schad
Bronze:	(Puerto Rico) Jaime Frontera & Emilie Viqueira

=== Men's team ===
Gold:	Brazil
Silver:	Puerto Rico
Bronze:	Chile
Bronze:	Cuba

=== Women's team ===
Gold:	**Brazil**
Silver:	Venezuela
Bronze:	Chile
Bronze:	Cuba
