= Douglas Chiarotti =

Brazilian volleyball player (born 1970)

Personal information
- Born: 10 November 1970 (age 55); São Paulo, Brazil
- Height: 2.01 m (6 ft 7 in)
- Weight: 105 kg (231 lb)

Volleyball information
- Position: Middle blocker
- Number: 8

National team
1991–2001	Brazil
Honours
Men's volleyball
Representing Brazil
Olympic Games
Gold medal – first place	1992 Barcelona	Team
World Grand Champions Cup
Gold medal – first place	1997 Japan
World League
Gold medal – first place	1993 São Paulo
Gold medal – first place	2001 Katowice
Silver medal – second place	1995 Rio de Janeiro
Bronze medal – third place	1994 Milan
Bronze medal – third place	1999 Mar del Plata
Bronze medal – third place	2000 Rotterdam
Pan American Games
Silver medal – second place	1999 Winnipeg	Team
South American Championship
Gold medal – first place	1991 Brazil
Gold medal – first place	1997 Venezuela
Gold medal – first place	1999 Argentina

Douglas Chiarotti (born 10 November 1970), known as Douglas, is a Brazilian former volleyball player who competed in the 1992 Summer Olympics and in the 2000 Summer Olympics.

Douglas was born in Santo André, São Paulo, Brazil.

In 1992, Douglas was part of the Brazilian team that won the gold medal in the Olympic tournament. He played six matches.

Eight years later, Douglas finished sixth with the Brazilian team in the 2000 Olympic tournament. He played all eight matches.
