= Dan Greenbaum =

American volleyball player (born 1969)

Personal information
- Born: Daniel Robert Greenbaum; March 12, 1969 (age 57); Torrance, California, U.S.
- Height: 190 cm (6 ft 3 in)
- Education: University of Southern California

Volleyball information
- Position: Setter
- Number: 2

National team
1991–1995	United States
Medal record
Men's volleyball
Representing United States
Olympic Games
Bronze medal – third place	1992 Barcelona	Team
World Championship
Bronze medal – third place	1994 Greece	Team
FIVB World Cup
Bronze medal – third place	1991 Japan
Pan American Games
Silver medal – second place	1995 Mar del Plata	Team

Daniel "Dan" Robert Greenbaum (born March 12, 1969) is an American former volleyball player who competed in the 1992 Summer Olympics in Barcelona and won a bronze medal. He was a setter.

Greenbaum was born in Torrance, California. He played college volleyball at the University of Southern California, where he was twice an All-American and helped the Trojans win NCAA Championships in 1988 and 1990. In 1990, he was selected to the All-Tournament Team.

== Japanese V.League ==
Greenbaum played professionally in Japan for Team NEC in 1995–1996.

== Awards ==
- Two-time All-American
- Two-time NCAA Champion — 1988, 1990
- All-Tournament Team — 1990
- FIVB World Cup bronze medal — 1991
- Olympic bronze medal — 1992
- FIVB World Championship bronze medal — 1994
- Pan American Games silver medal — 1995

== See also ==
- List of select Jewish volleyball players
