= 1993 Hellmann's Cup =

Tennis tournament

- Date: 25 October – 1 November
- Edition: 1st
- Category: World Series
- Draw: 32S / 16D
- Prize money: $200,000
- Surface: Clay / outdoor
- Location: Santiago, Chile

Champions

Singles
- (Argentina) Javier Frana

Doubles
- (United States) Mike Bauer / (Czech Republic) David Rikl
- Chile Open

The 1993 Hellmann's Cup was a men's ATP tournament held in Santiago, Chile on outdoor clay courts that was part of the World Series of the 1993 ATP Tour. It was the inaugural edition of the tournament and was held from 25 October until 1 November 1997. Unseeded Javier Frana won the singles title.

== Finals ==
=== Singles ===
(Argentina) Javier Frana defeated (Spain) Emilio Sánchez 7–5, 3–6, 6–3

- It was Frana's 3rd title of the year and the 7th of his career.

=== Doubles ===
(United States) Mike Bauer / (Czech Republic) David Rikl defeated (Sweden) Christer Allgårdh / (United States) Brian Devening 7–6, 6–4

- It was Bauer's 2nd title of the year and the 10th of his career. It was Rikl's only title of the year and the 3rd of his career.
