= Marcelo Rebolledo =

Chilean tennis player (born 1971)

- Country (sports): Chile
- Born: 22 October 1971 (age 54)
- Prize money: $13,985

Singles
- Highest ranking: No. 439 (15 Aug 1994)

Doubles
- Career record: 1–4 (ATP Tour & Davis Cup)
- Highest ranking: No. 207 (28 Nov 1994)

Marcelo Rebolledo (born 22 October 1971) is a Chilean former professional tennis player.

Rebolledo was a member of Chile's Davis Cup team between 1994 and 1996, playing in three doubles rubbers. He partnered Gabriel Silberstein twice and Marcelo Ríos once. At ATP Tour level he made his only main draw appearance in doubles at the 1994 Chile Open, where he and Àlex Corretja reached the semi-finals.

== ATP Challenger titles ==
=== Doubles: (1) ===
| No. | Date | Tournament | Surface | Partner | Opponents | Score |
|---|---|---|---|---|---|---|
| 1. | Feb 1993 | Viña del Mar Challenger; Viña del Mar, Chile | Clay | (Argentina) Martín Rodríguez | (Russia) Andrei Merinov (Italy) Laurence Tieleman | 6–3, 7–6 |

== See also ==
- List of Chile Davis Cup team representatives
