= Felipe Rivera =

Chilean tennis player

- Country (sports): Chile
- Residence: Santiago
- Born: 10 May 1971; Arica, Chile
- Died: 1 October 1995 (aged 24); Santiago, Chile
- Height: 1.83 m (6 ft 0 in)
- Turned pro: 1989
- Plays: Right-handed
- Prize money: $112,854

Singles
- Career record: 6–12
- Career titles: 0
- Highest ranking: No. 173 (18 Nov 1991)

Grand Slam singles results
- French Open: 1R (1991)
- US Open: 1R (1992)

Doubles
- Career record: 3–3
- Career titles: 0
- Highest ranking: No. 240 (20 May 1991)

Felipe Rivera (10 May 1971 – 1 October 1995) was a professional tennis player from Chile.

== Career ==
Rivera was a semi-finalist in the 1989 Orange Bowl and the top ranked Chilean junior in the 14s, 16s and 18s age categories.

In 1991, Rivera reached the quarter-finals of the Banespa Open in São Paulo with wins over Martín Jaite and Jean-Philippe Fleurian. At the French Open that year he came up against Dinu Pescariu in the first round and won the opening set, but lost the next two and had to retire hurt in the fourth set. His only other Grand Slam appearance was in the US Open in 1992, where he lost a four set match in the first round to American Scott Davis. He also qualified for the 1992 German Open (an ATP Super 9 event) and made the second round, after defeating Spaniard José Francisco Altur. As a doubles player he had his best win on tour when he and partner Sergio Cortés defeated third seeds Tomás Carbonell and Byron Talbot at the 1993 Movistar Open.

He played three ties for the Chile Davis Cup team during his career, the first in 1991, when he was aged only 19. In that tie he teamed up with Hans Gildemeister in the doubles and they defeated the Dominican pairing. In 1992 he appeared in Chile's tie against Cuba. He won the opening rubber, over Juan Pino but Chile lost the other four matches, two of which Rivera played. The Chilean also participated in his country's tie against the Bahamas in 1993, which they lost 2–3. Rivera took on Roger Smith in the opening match and Mark Knowles in the final and deciding rubber, losing both.

== Death ==
Rivera was killed in a car crash on 1 October 1995. At the time of his death he was still active on tour, having taken part in a Challenger tournament at Belo Horizonte in July.
