= Paulo Abreu =

Brazilian water polo player

Personal information
- Full name: Paulo Francisco Joazeiro de Abreu
- Born: 3 December 1965; Rio de Janeiro, Brazil
- Died: 26 July 2015 (aged 49); Rio de Janeiro, Brazil
- Height: 1.76 m (5 ft 9 in)
- Weight: 78 kg (172 lb)

Sport
- Sport: Water polo

Paulo Francisco Joazeiro de Abreu (Sú) (3 December 1965 – 26 July 2015) was a Brazilian water polo player. He competed in the 1984 Summer Olympics. He died of heart problems.
