= Martin van der Horst =

Dutch volleyball player (born 1965)

Personal information
- Full name: Johannes Martinus van der Horst
- Nickname: Martin
- Born: 2 April 1965 (age 61); Heemskerk, North Holland, Netherlands
- Height: 214 cm (7 ft 0 in)

Volleyball information
- Position: Middle blocker
- Number: 14

National team
1989–2000	Netherlands
Honours
Men's volleyball
Representing the Netherlands
Olympic Games
Silver medal – second place	1992 Barcelona	Team
World Championship
Silver medal – second place	1994 Greece	Team
World League
Silver medal – second place	1990 Osaka
European Championship
Silver medal – second place	1993 Finland
Silver medal – second place	1995 Greece
Bronze medal – third place	1989 Sweden
Bronze medal – third place	1991 Germany

Johannes Martinus van der Horst (born 2 April 1965) is a retired volleyball player from the Netherlands who represented his native country at two Summer Olympics (1992 and 2000). He was a member of the Dutch national team that won the silver medal in Barcelona (1992).

== Individual awards ==
- 1991 FIVB World League "Best Blocker"
