= Ronald Zoodsma =

Dutch volleyball player (born 1966)

Personal information
- Born: 5 September 1966 (age 60); Sneek, Friesland, Netherlands
- Height: 201 cm (6 ft 7 in)

Volleyball information
- Position: Middle blocker
- Number: 15

National team
1987–1994	Netherlands
Honours
Men's volleyball
Representing the Netherlands
Olympic Games
Silver medal – second place	1992 Barcelona	Team
World Championship
Silver medal – second place	1994 Greece	Team
World League
Silver medal – second place	1990 Osaka
European Championship
Silver medal – second place	1993 Finland
Bronze medal – third place	1989 Sweden

Ronald Zoodsma (born 5 September 1966) is a retired volleyball player from the Netherlands who represented his native country at two consecutive Summer Olympics, starting in 1988. Under the guidance of head coach Arie Selinger, he was part of the Dutch team that placed fifth in Seoul, and won the silver medal four years later in Barcelona.
