= Nick Becker =

American volleyball player (born 1968)

Personal information
- Born: Nick Adrian Becker; July 30, 1968 (age 58); Fullerton, California, U.S.
- Height: 193 cm (6 ft 4 in)
- Education: University of Southern California

Volleyball information
- Position: Outside hitter
- Number: 3

National team
1991–1992	United States
Medal record
Men's volleyball
Representing the United States
Olympic Games
Bronze medal – third place	1992 Barcelona	Team

Nick Adrian Becker (born July 30, 1968) is an American former volleyball player who played with the United States national volleyball team and won a bronze medal in the 1992 Summer Olympics in Barcelona, Spain. He was valued on the team as a great passer.

== Early life ==
Becker went to Mater Dei High School in Santa Ana, California, where he played soccer in his senior year and made the All-Southern Section as a half-back. He graduated from Mater Dei in 1986.

== College ==
Becker played college volleyball with the University of Southern California (USC) as a walk-on, and helped the Trojans win NCAA Championship titles in 1988 and 1990. He graduated from USC in 1991 with a degree in economics, and then joined the national volleyball team.

== Awards ==
- Two-time NCAA Champion — 1988, 1990
- Olympic bronze medal — 1992
