= 1995 Hellmann's Cup – Doubles =

Doubles
- 1995 Hellmann's Cup

Final
- Champions: (Czech Republic) Jiří Novák (Czech Republic) David Rikl
- Runners-up: (United States) Shelby Cannon (United States) Francisco Montana
- Score: 6–4, 4–6, 6–1

Details
- Draw: 16 (3WC/1Q)
- Seeds: 4

Events
| Singles | Doubles |
- Chile Open

Karel Nováček and Mats Wilander were the defending champions, but did not participate this year.

Jiří Novák and David Rikl won the title, defeating Shelby Cannon and Francisco Montana 6–4, 4–6, 6–1 in the final.

== Seeds ==
1. (Spain) Tomás Carbonell / (Spain) Francisco Roig (quarterfinals)
2. (Spain) Sergio Casal / (Spain) Emilio Sánchez (semifinals)
3. (Czech Republic) Jiří Novák / (Czech Republic) David Rikl (champions)
4. (Portugal) Nuno Marques / (United States) Jack Waite (first round)

== Draw ==
Key

- Q = Qualifier
- WC = Wild card
- LL = Lucky loser
- Alt = Alternate
- ITF = ITF entry
- PR = Protected ranking
- SR = Special ranking
- SE = Special exempt
- JE = Junior exempt
- JR = Junior Accelerator Programme entrant
- CO = College Accelerator Programme entrant
- NG = Next Gen Accelerator Program entrant
- w/o = Walkover
- r = Retired
- d = Defaulted

=== Draw ===
First round
1 | (Spain) T Carbonell (Spain) F Roig | 6 | 3 | 6
WC | (Czech Republic) S Doseděl (Austria) G Schaller | 1 | 6 | 2
(Venezuela) N Pereira (France) F Santoro | 6 | 6 | 6
WC | (Chile) M Ríos (Netherlands) S Schalken | 1 | 7 | 3
3 | (Czech Republic) J Novák (Czech Republic) D Rikl | 6 | 7
(South Africa) B Haygarth (United States) D Johnson | 2 | 6
(Portugal) E Couto (Hungary) G Köves | 4 | 6 | 7
(Australia) J Eagle (Australia) A Florent | 6 | 1 | 6
Q | (Czech Republic) T Krupa (Czech Republic) P Vízner | 6 | 6 | 1
(United States) S Cannon (United States) F Montana | 7 | 3 | 6
(Spain) JA Conde (South Africa) C van Rensburg | 7 | 6
4 | (Portugal) N Marques (United States) J Waite | 5 | 2
(Spain) J Arrese (Spain) À Corretja | 6 | 6
WC | (Chile) G Silberstein (Peru) J Yzaga | 2 | 3
(Spain) J Sánchez (United States) V Spadea | 6 | 0 | 3
2 | (Spain) S Casal (Spain) E Sánchez | 4 | 6 | 6

Quarterfinals
1 | (Spain) T Carbonell (Spain) F Roig | 7 | 4 | 2
(Venezuela) N Pereira (France) F Santoro | 6 | 6 | 6
3 | (Czech Republic) J Novák (Czech Republic) D Rikl | 6 | 6
(Portugal) E Couto (Hungary) G Köves | 4 | 2
(United States) S Cannon (United States) F Montana | 3 | 6 | 6
(Spain) JA Conde (South Africa) C van Rensburg | 6 | 4 | 3
(Spain) J Arrese (Spain) À Corretja | 5 | 1
2 | (Spain) S Casal (Spain) E Sánchez | 7 | 6

Semifinals
(Venezuela) N Pereira (France) F Santoro | 4 | 5
3 | (Czech Republic) J Novák (Czech Republic) D Rikl | 6 | 7
(United States) S Cannon (United States) F Montana | 7 | 6
2 | (Spain) S Casal (Spain) E Sánchez | 5 | 3

Final
3 | (Czech Republic) J Novák (Czech Republic) D Rikl | 6 | 4 | 6
(United States) S Cannon (United States) F Montana | 4 | 6 | 1
