= Scott Fortune =

American former volleyball player

Personal information
- Full name: Scott Thomas Fortune
- Born: January 23, 1966 (age 60); Newport Beach, California, U.S.
- Hometown: Laguna Beach, California, U.S.
- Height: 6 ft 6 in (1.98 m)
- Education: Stanford University

Volleyball information
- Position: Outside hitter
- Number: 8

National team
1986–1996	United States
Medal record
Men's volleyball
Representing the United States
Olympic Games
Gold medal – first place	1988 Seoul	Team
Bronze medal – third place	1992 Barcelona	Team
World Championship
Bronze medal – third place	1994 Greece	Team
FIVB World Cup
Bronze medal – third place	1991 Japan

Scott Thomas Fortune (born January 23, 1966) is an American former volleyball player. Fortune was an All-American at Stanford University and a three-time Olympian for the United States national team. He helped the United States win the gold medal at the 1988 Summer Olympics and the bronze medal at the 1992 Summer Olympics.

== Early life ==
Fortune played for the volleyball team at Laguna Beach High School. He helped the team win the 1983 CIF championship. As a senior, he was named the South Coast League's Most Valuable Player. Fortune was also a point guard on the school's basketball team.

== College ==
Fortune played for Stanford from 1985 to 1989. He was selected as an All-American in 1987 and 1989. He helped Stanford advance to the NCAA Final Four in 1989, and was selected to the All-Tournament Team.

In 1998, Fortune was inducted into the Stanford Athletics Hall of Fame.

== International ==
Fortune joined the national team in 1986. He was a member of the gold medal winning team at the 1988 Summer Olympics in Seoul. In 1991, he was named the USOC Male Volleyball Athlete of the Year. He won the best passer and best digger awards at that year's World League. At the 1992 Summer Olympics in Barcelona, Fortune, as captain of the bronze medal winning United States team, was named best digger. He also played at the 1996 Summer Olympics in Atlanta.

== Professional ==
Fortune played on the 4-Man Pro-Beach Tour from 1992 to 1995. In 1993, he was named the Offensive Player of the Year. In 1994, he played for the league champions, Team Sony Autosound. Fortune also played for clubs in Greece and Italy.

== Personal life ==
Fortune was born in Newport Beach, California, on January 23, 1966. He is 6 feet 6 inches (1.98 m) tall. His brother Todd was a University of California volleyball player.

As of 2023, Fortune is a Managing Director and Senior Research Analyst for ROTH MKM.
