= Bob Samuelson =

American volleyball player (born 1966)

Personal information
- Born: Robert Lewis Samuelson; July 30, 1973 (age 53); Port Jefferson, New York, U.S.
- Height: 6 ft 5 in (196 cm)
- Education: California State University, Northridge

Volleyball information
- Position: Outside hitter
- Number: 9 (national team)

Career
Years	Teams
1994–1997	Suntory Sunbirds

National team
1989–1994	United States
Medal record
Men's volleyball
Representing United States
Olympic Games
Bronze medal – third place	1992 Barcelona	Indoor
World Championship
Bronze medal – third place	1994 Greece	Indoor
FIVB World Cup
Bronze medal – third place	1991 Japan

Robert Lewis Samuelson (born July 30, 1966) is an American former volleyball player. Samuelson won a bronze medal with the United States national team in the 1992 Summer Olympics in Barcelona.

At the Barcelona Olympics, Samuelson was the central character in the controversial preliminary round match against Japan in which the United States won until the result was overturned on appeal. A jury set up by the International Volleyball Federation ruled that by Samuelson having received his second yellow card, a red card and an automatic point to Japan should have been given, thus giving Japan the point they needed to win the match. The entire United States men's team then shaved their heads in solidarity with Samuelson.

== College ==
After finishing high school at Westchester High School in Westchester, Los Angeles, Samuelson played volleyball for Los Angeles Pierce College, leading the team to the state title in 1986. He was also selected as California's junior college player of the year.

Samuelson then played college volleyball at Cal State Northridge (CSUN), where he was a two-time All-American. He set the school record with 44 kills in a match against George Mason in 1989.

Samuelson was inducted into the CSUN Hall of Fame in 1994.

== Japanese V.League ==
Samuelson left the national team to compete for the Suntory Sunbirds of the Japanese V.League in 1994, where he played for three seasons. Samuelson led the team to the championship in his first season, and was named the league's Most Valuable Player.

== Beach volleyball ==
Samuelson briefly played beach volleyball in 1994, and then again between 2004 and 2006.

== Personal life ==
Samuelson is a father of triplet boys.

== Awards ==
- Two-time NCAA All-American
- FIVB World Cup bronze medal — 1991
- Olympic bronze medal — 1992
- FIVB World Championship bronze medal — 1994
- CSUN Hall of fame — 1994
- Japan V.League Champion — 1995
- Japan V.League MVP — 1995
