= 1994 Hellmann's Cup =

- Date: 24–31 October
- Edition: 2nd
- Category: World Series
- Draw: 32S / 16D
- Prize money: $188,750
- Surface: Clay / Outdoor
- Location: Santiago, Chile

Champions

Singles
- (Spain) Alberto Berasategui

Doubles
- (Czech Republic) Karel Nováček / (Sweden) Mats Wilander
- Chile Open

The 1994 Santiago Hellmann's Cup was a men's tennis tournament held in Santiago, Chile and played on outdoor clay courts. The tournament was part of the ATP World Series circuit of the 1994 ATP Tour. It was the second edition of the tournament and was held from 24 October to 31 October 1994.

== Finals ==
=== Singles ===
(Spain) Alberto Berasategui defeated (Spain) Francisco Clavet 6–3, 6–4

- It was Berasategui's 6th singles title of the year, and the 7th of his career.

=== Doubles ===
(Czech Republic) Karel Nováček / (Sweden) Mats Wilander defeated (Spain) Tomás Carbonell / (Spain) Francisco Roig, 4–6, 7–6, 7–6

- It was Novacek's 4th title of the year and the 19th of his career. It was Wilander's 2nd title of the year and the 40th of his career.
