= William Kyriakos =

Brazilian tennis player

- Full name: William Kyriakos Jr.
- Country (sports): Brazil
- Born: 3 September 1972 (age 52); São Paulo, Brazil
- Prize money: $27,531

Singles
- Career record: 0–1
- Highest ranking: No. 266 (24 Jun 1991)

Doubles
- Career record: 0–2
- Highest ranking: No. 244 (15 Feb 1993)
Medal record
Pan American Games
Gold medal – first place	1991 Havana	Men's team
Silver medal – second place	1991 Havana	Mixed doubles

William Kyriakos Jr. (born 3 September 1972) is a Brazilian former professional tennis player.

Kyriakos, who comes from São Paulo, represented Brazil at the 1991 Pan American Games in Havana. He won a silver medal in the mixed doubles competition, partnering Cláudia Chabalgoity, as well as a gold medal in the team event. The team of Kyriakos, Nelson Aerts and Marcelo Saliola defeated Puerto Rico in the final.

On the professional tour, Kyriakos had a career best singles ranking of 266 in the world and made an ATP Tour main draw appearance as a qualifier at the Brasília Open, held once only in 1991. He lost in the first round to José Daher.
