= Carlos Briceno =

American volleyball player (born 1967)

Personal information
- Born: Carlos Martin Briceno; August 10, 1967 (age 59); Newport Beach, California, U.S.
- Height: 6 ft 4 in (193 cm)
- Education: University of Hawaii

Volleyball information
- Position: Outside hitter
- Number: 1

National team
1991–1993	United States
Medal record
Men's volleyball
Representing United States
Olympic Games
Bronze medal – third place	1992 Barcelona	Indoor
Men's beach volleyball
Representing the United States
Goodwill Games
Silver medal – second place	1994 Saint Petersburg

Carlos Martin Briceno (born August 10, 1967) is an American former volleyball player who competed in the 1992 Summer Olympics in Barcelona, and won a bronze medal. He was known for his versatility, being able to spike from different parts of the court, including the back row.

Briceno played volleyball at Fountain Valley High School, where he made the All-Southern Section. He then played college volleyball at the University of Hawaii, where he was a three-time All-American.

== Beach volleyball ==
Between 1994 and 1996, and then briefly in 1998, Briceno played beach volleyball and won about $125,000 in prizes. He won the beach volleyball silver medal at the 1994 Goodwill Games while partnering with Jeff Williams.

== Awards ==
- High school All-Southern Section
- Three-time All-American
- Olympic bronze medal — 1992
- Goodwill Games beach volleyball silver medal — 1994
