= Otávio Della =

Brazilian tennis player

- Country (sports): Brazil
- Born: 22 June 1969 (age 56) São Paulo, Brazil
- Height: 1.70 m (5 ft 7 in)
- Plays: Right-handed
- Prize money: $66,279

Singles
- Career record: 1–3
- Career titles: 0
- Highest ranking: No. 299 (5 March 1990)

Doubles
- Career record: 2–7
- Career titles: 0
- Highest ranking: No. 125 (26 September 1994)

Otávio Della (born 22 June 1969) is a Brazilian former professional tennis player, now a tennis administrator.

Della played mostly on the Challenger circuit, but also made some appearances on the Grand Prix tennis circuit and ATP Tour. He twice participated in the Guarujá Open and in 1988 made it into the second round, with a win over Swede Ronnie Båthman. The Brazilian also played at the 1989 Citibank Open in Itaparica, where he was defeated in the opening round by Todd Witsken of the United States.

He had more success as a doubles player, winning five Challenger titles and making quarter-finals at Umag in 1990 and Bogota in 1994.

== Challenger titles ==
=== Doubles: (5) ===
No.	Year	Tournament	Surface	Partner	Opponents	Score
1.	1993	Cotia, Brazil	Hard	(Brazil) Marcelo Saliola	(Brazil) Danilo Marcelino (Spain) Francisco Roig	6–2, 6–7, 6–3
2.	1993	São Luís, Brazil	Hard	(Brazil) Marcelo Saliola	(Brazil) Luiz Mattar (Brazil) Jaime Oncins	6–7, 6–3, 7–6
3.	1994	São Paulo, Brazil	Clay	(Brazil) Marcelo Saliola	(Brazil) Nelson Aerts (Brazil) Danilo Marcelino	6–4, 6–2
4.	1994	Fortaleza, Brazil	Hard	(Brazil) Marcelo Saliola	(United States) Bill Barber (United States) Ivan Baron	W/O
5.	1994	Natal, Brazil	Clay	(Brazil) Marcelo Saliola	(Argentina) Gastón Etlis (Paraguay) Ricardo Mena	6–4, 6–3
