= Bill Barber (tennis) =

American tennis player

- Full name: Bill Barber
- Country (sports): United States
- Born: October 2, 1970 (age 55)
- Prize money: $32,309

Singles
- Career record: 1–1
- Career titles: 0
- Highest ranking: No. 259 (October 10, 1994)

Doubles
- Career record: 1–4
- Career titles: 0
- Highest ranking: No. 147 (October 10, 1994)

Bill Barber (born October 2, 1970) is an American former professional tennis player.

== Biography ==
Barber, the son of a tennis referee, grew up in Brandywine, Maryland. He played collegiate tennis at UCLA, then in the early 1990s competed professionally.

At the 1994 Legg Mason Tennis Classic he made it through qualifying and beat Alex O'Brien in the first round, before being eliminated in the second round by Jonathan Stark.

He won two Challenger titles in doubles, at Brasilia and Seoul in 1994.

== Challenger titles ==
=== Doubles: (2) ===
No.	Year	Tournament	Surface	Partner	Opponents	Score
1.	1994	Brasília, Brazil	Hard	(United States) Ivan Baron	(Brazil) Nelson Aerts (Brazil) Danilo Marcelino	6–0, 7–5
2.	1994	Seoul, South Korea	Hard	(United States) Ari Nathan	(Mexico) Óscar Ortiz (Italy) Laurence Tieleman	7–6, 6–2
