= Marcelo Saliola =

Brazilian tennis player

- Country (sports): Brazil
- Born: 31 December 1973 (age 51) São Paulo, Brazil
- Height: 5 ft 10 in (178 cm)
- Plays: Left-handed
- Prize money: $47,779

Singles
- Career record: 3-3
- Career titles: 0
- Highest ranking: No. 237 (16 Sep 1991)

Doubles
- Career record: 1-5
- Career titles: 0
- Highest ranking: No. 121 (26 Sep 1994)

Marcelo Saliola (born 31 December 1973) is a Brazilian former professional tennis player.

Saliola was the runner-up in the 1988 Junior Orange Bowl and won the South American Junior Championships in 1991, for the under 18 age bracket.

He had his best result on the ATP Tour at 1991 Brasilia Open when he made it into the round of 16, with a win over second seed and world number 12 Emilio Sánchez. He was a doubles quarter-finalist in the 1994 Colombia Open, partnering Otavio Della, with whom he won five Challenger titles.

The Brazilian won a bronze medal in the singles event at the 1991 Pan American Games

== Challenger titles ==
=== Doubles: (5) ===
| No. | Year | Tournament | Surface | Partner | Opponents in the final | Score in the final |
|---|---|---|---|---|---|---|
| 1. | 1993 | Cotia, Brazil | Hard | (Brazil) Otavio Della | (Brazil) Danilo Marcelino (Spain) Francisco Roig | 6–2, 6–7, 6–3 |
| 2. | 1993 | São Luís, Brazil | Hard | (Brazil) Otavio Della | (Brazil) Luiz Mattar (Brazil) Jaime Oncins | 6–7, 6–3, 7–6 |
| 3. | 1994 | São Paulo, Brazil | Clay | (Brazil) Otavio Della | (Brazil) Nelson Aerts (Brazil) Danilo Marcelino | 6–4, 6–2 |
| 4. | 1994 | Fortaleza, Brazil | Hard | (Brazil) Otavio Della | (United States) Bill Barber (United States) Ivan Baron | W/O |
| 5. | 1994 | Natal, Brazil | Clay | (Brazil) Otavio Della | (Argentina) Gastón Etlis (Paraguay) Ricardo Mena | 6–4, 6–3 |
