= Volleyball at the 1991 Pan American Games =

- Start date: August 11, 1991
- End date: August 18, 1991

This page presents the results of the men's and women's volleyball tournament during the 1991 Pan American Games, which was held from August 11 to August 18, 1991, in Havana, Cuba.

== Men's indoor tournament ==
=== Preliminary round robin ===
	Team	Points	G	W	L	SW	SL	Ratio
1.	Cuba	10	5	5	0	15	1	15.000
2.	Brazil	9	5	4	1	13	4	3.250
3.	United States	8	5	3	2	9	10	0.900
4.	Argentina	7	5	2	3	9	10	0.900
5.	Canada	6	5	1	4	5	13	0.385
6.	Puerto Rico	5	5	0	5	2	15	0.133

- Sunday August 11

United States	3 – 1	Canada	15-13 16-14 13-15 15-10
Brazil	3 – 1	Argentina
Cuba	3 – 0	Puerto Rico

- Monday August 12

Brazil	3 – 0	United States
Cuba	3 – 0	Canada
Argentina	3 – 0	Puerto Rico

- Tuesday August 13

United States	3 – 1	Puerto Rico
Brazil	3 – 0	Canada
Cuba	3 – 0	Argentina

- Wednesday August 14

Brazil	3 – 0	Puerto Rico
Argentina	3 – 1	Canada	15- 7 11-15 15-12 15-10
Cuba	3 – 0	United States	15- 3 15- 6 15- 9

- Thursday August 15

United States	3 – 2	Argentina	9 -15 15-13 13-15 15-11 15-12
Canada	3 – 1	Puerto Rico	15- 7 16-14 11-15 15-12
Cuba	3 – 1	Brazil

=== Final round ===
Semifinals
1991-08-17 – Havana
Cuba	3
Argentina	0
1991-08-17 – Havana
Brazil	3
United States	0

Final
1991-08-18 – Havana
Cuba	3
Brazil	0
3rd place
1991-08-18 – Havana
Argentina	3
United States	1

- Saturday August 17
  - Fifth place match

Puerto Rico	3 – 2	Canada	10-15 15- 8 15- 9 12-15 15-12

  - Semi-finals

Cuba	3 – 0	Argentina	15- 4 15- 3 15- 5
Brazil	3 – 0	United States	15- 5 15- 8 15- 7

- Sunday August 18
  - Bronze medal match

Argentina	3 – 1	United States	17-15 6 -15 15- 6 15-10

  - Gold medal match

Cuba	3 – 0	Brazil	15- 9 15-12 15- 8

=== Final ranking ===
Place	Team
1.	Cuba
2.	Brazil
3.	Argentina
4.	United States
5.	Puerto Rico
6.	Canada

1991 Pan American Games winners

Cuba
Fourth title

== Women's indoor tournament ==
=== Preliminary round robin ===
	Team	Points	G	W	L	SW	SL	Ratio
1.	Cuba	10	5	5	0	15	2	7.500
2.	Peru	9	5	4	1	13	3	4.333
3.	Brazil	8	5	3	2	9	7	1.283
4.	Canada	8	5	3	2	6	10	0.600
5.	United States	6	5	1	4	6	12	0.500
6.	Argentina	5	5	0	5	0	15	0.000

=== Final round ===
Semifinals
1991-08-17 – Havana
Cuba	3
Canada	0
1991-08-17 – Havana
Brazil	3
Peru	1

Final
1991-03-18 – Havana
Cuba	3
Brazil	1
3rd place
1991-03-18 – Havana
Canada	0
Peru	3

- Saturday August 17
  - Fifth place match

United States	3 – 1	Argentina	9 -15 15- 6 15-13 15- 5

  - Semi-finals

Cuba	3 – 0	Canada	15- 5 15-13 15- 5 5
Brazil	3 – 1	Peru	15- 6 5 -15 17-15 15- 7

- Sunday August 18
  - Bronze medal match

Peru	3 – 0	Canada	15-13 15- 9 15- 2

  - Gold medal match

Cuba	3 – 1	Brazil	8 -15 15- 6 15- 9 15- 6

=== Final ranking ===
Place	Team
1.	Cuba
2.	Brazil
3.	Peru
4.	Canada
5.	United States
6.	Argentina

1991 Pan American Games winners

Cuba
Sixth title
