= 1993 Men's South American Volleyball Championship =

The 1993 Men's South American Volleyball Championship, took place in 1993 in Córdoba (Argentina).

== Final positions ==
Place	Team
	Brazil
	Argentina
	Chile
4	Venezuela

Source: Todor66.com
