= 1991 Men's South American Volleyball Championship =

The 1991 Men's South American Volleyball Championship, took place in 1991 in São Paulo (Brazil).

== Final positions ==
Place	Team
	Brazil
	Argentina
	Venezuela
4	Peru

Source: Todor66.com
