= List of Pan American Games medalists in weightlifting =

This is the complete list of Pan American Games medalists in weightlifting from 1951 to 2023. In the 1971 edition, four sets of medals were awarded for each weight.

== Men's competition ==
=== Flyweight ===
- –52 kg (1971–1991)
- –54 kg (1995)

Games	Gold	Silver	Bronze
1971 (Press)	Roberto Lindeborg; Netherlands Antilles	Chun Hon Chan; Canada	A. Garcia; Puerto Rico
1971 (Snatch)	Chun Hon Chan; Canada	Juan Romero; Colombia	Lester Francel; Colombia
1971 (Clean & jerk)	Juan Romero; Colombia	Lester Francel; Colombia	Roberto Lindeborg; Netherlands Antilles
1971 (Total)	Juan Romero; Colombia	Roberto Lindeborg; Netherlands Antilles	Chun Hon Chan; Canada
1975	Francisco Casamayor; Cuba	Narcisco Orán; Panama	Lázaro de la Cruz; Dominican Republic
1979	Francisco Casamayor; Cuba	José Díaz; Panama	Samuel Alexis Vázquez; Venezuela
1983	Juan Hernández; Cuba	Humberto Fuentes; Venezuela	Ader Rincones; Venezuela
1987	Juan Hernández; Cuba	Humberto Fuentes; Venezuela	Jose Farfán; Venezuela
1991	Héctor Arzola; Cuba	Humberto Fuentes; Venezuela	Orlando Vásquez; Nicaragua
1995	Jesús Aparicio; Cuba	Juan Carlos Fernández; Colombia	Orlando Vásquez; Nicaragua

=== Bantamweight ===
- –56 kg (1951–1967)
- 52–56 kg (1971–1991)
- 54–59 kg (1995)
- –56 kg (1999–2015)
- –61 kg (2019–)

Games	Gold	Silver	Bronze
1951	Joseph DePietro; United States	José Crespo; Cuba	Marcelino Salas; Mexico
1955	Charles Vinci; United States	Ángel Famiglietti; Panama	Ignacio Suárez; Cuba
1959	Charles Vinci; United States	Ángel Famiglietti; Panama	(West Indies Federation) Grantley Sobers (WIF)
1963	Martin Dias; British Guiana	Hector Curiel; Netherlands Antilles	Gary Hanson; United States
1967	Fernando Báez; Puerto Rico	Anthony Phillips; Barbados	Martin Dias; Guyana
1971 (Press)	Fernando Báez; Puerto Rico	Anthony Phillips; Barbados	Rolando Chang; Cuba
1971 (Snatch)	Rolando Chang; Cuba	Carlos Lastre; Cuba	Jesús Conde; Mexico
1971 (Clean & jerk)	Rolando Chang; Cuba	Carlos Lastre; Cuba	Fernando Báez; Puerto Rico
1971 (Total)	Rolando Chang; Cuba	Fernando Báez; Puerto Rico	Carlos Lastre; Cuba
1975	Carlos Lastre; Cuba	Paulo de Sene; Brazil	Fernando Báez; Puerto Rico
1979	Daniel Núñez; Cuba	Lázaro de la Cruz; Dominican Republic	Francisco Benítez; Mexico
1983	Aristóteles Soler; Cuba	José Ramírez; Dominican Republic	Porfirio de León; Puerto Rico
1987	Pedro Negrín; Cuba	Tolentino Murillo; Colombia	Cristian Rivera; Dominican Republic
1991	William Vargas; Cuba	José Farfán; Venezuela	Carlos David; Colombia
1995	William Vargas; Cuba	Bryan Jacob; United States	Roger Berrio; Colombia
1999	Sergio Álvarez; Cuba	Nelson Castro; Colombia	Juan Carlos Fernández; Colombia
2003	Nelson Castro; Colombia	Tomas Aquino; Dominican Republic	David Mendoza; Honduras
2007	Sergio Álvarez; Cuba	Marvin López; El Salvador	Jaime Iturra; Chile
2011	Sergio Álvarez; Cuba	Sergio Rada; Colombia	José Montes; Mexico
2015	Habib de las Salas; Colombia	Carlos Berna; Colombia	Luis García; Dominican Republic
2019	Francisco Mosquera; Colombia	Jhon Serna; Colombia	Antonio Vázquez; Mexico
2023	Arley Calderón; Cuba	Víctor Güemez; Mexico	Luis Bardalez; Peru

=== Featherweight ===
- 56–60 kg (1951–1991)
- 59–64 kg (1995)
- 56–62 kg (1999–2015)
- 61–67 kg (2019–)

Games	Gold	Silver	Bronze
1951	Rodney Wilkes; Trinidad and Tobago	Richard Greenawalt; United States	Joseph Charlot; Haiti
1955	Carlos Chávez; Panama	Yas Kuzuhara; United States	Edmundo Álvarez; Mexico
1959	Isaac Berger; United States	(West Indies Federation) Maurice King (WIF)	Mauro Alanís; Mexico
1963	Isaac Berger; United States	Pedro Serrano; Puerto Rico	Ildefonso Lee; Panama
1967	Walter Imahara; United States	Manuel Mateos; Mexico	Ildefonso Lee; Panama
1971 (Press)	Manuel Mateos; Mexico	Ildefonso Lee; Panama	Ignacio Guanche; Cuba
1971 (Snatch)	Ildefonso Lee; Panama	Ignacio Guanche; Cuba	Manuel Mateos; Mexico
1971 (Clean & jerk)	Manuel Mateos; Mexico	Ignacio Guanche; Cuba	Carlos Suarez; Colombia
1971 (Total)	Manuel Mateos; Mexico	Ignacio Guanche; Cuba	Ildefonso Lee; Panama
1975	Rolando Chang; Cuba	Andrés Santoyo; Mexico	Elkin Velázquez; Colombia
1979	Víctor Pérez; Cuba	Phillip Sanderson; United States	Ángel García; Dominican Republic
1983	Hildemar Rodríguez; Venezuela	Abdel González; Colombia	Ángel García; Dominican Republic
1987	Gabriel Enseñat; Cuba; Julio Loscos; Cuba	None	Gilles Desmarais; Canada
1991	Pedro Negrín; Cuba	Bryan Jacob; United States	John Salazar; Colombia
1995	Idalberto Aranda; Cuba	Gustavo Majauskas; Argentina	Henry Blanco; Venezuela
1999	Roger Berrio; Colombia	Marvin Jiménez; Guatemala	legrand Sakamaki; Guatemala
2003	Diego Salazar; Colombia	Vladimir Rodríguez; Cuba	Israel José Rubio; Venezuela
2007	Diego Salazar; Colombia	Miñan Mogollon; Peru	David Mendoza; Honduras
2011	Óscar Figueroa; Colombia	Jesús López; Venezuela	Diego Salazar; Colombia
2015	Óscar Figueroa; Colombia	Francisco Mosquera; Colombia	Jesús López; Venezuela
2019	Jonathan Muñoz; Mexico	Edgar Pineda; Guatemala	Luis Bardalez; Peru

=== Lightweight ===
- 60–67.5 kg (1951–1991)
- 64–70 kg (1995)
- 62–69 kg (1999–2015)
- 67–73 kg (2019–)

Games	Gold	Silver	Bronze
1951	Joe Pitman; United States	Carl de Souza; Trinidad and Tobago	Hugo D'Atri; Argentina
1955	Joe Pitman; United States	Ambrose Cornet; Netherlands Antilles	Emilio González; Argentina
1959	Juan Torres; Cuba	Paul Goldberg; United States	Alberto Gumbs; Panama
1963	Tony Garcy; United States	Rudy Monk; Netherlands Antilles	Roudolph Cox; Barbados
1967	Pastor Rodríguez; Cuba	Hugo Gittens; Trinidad and Tobago	Arnaldo Muñoz; Cuba
1971 (Press)	José Martínez; Colombia	Pastor Rodríguez; Cuba	Cipriano Gutierrez; Colombia
1971 (Snatch)	Pastor Rodríguez; Cuba	Victor Lopez; Puerto Rico	James Benjamin; United States
1971 (Clean & jerk)	James Benjamin; United States	Pastor Rodríguez; Cuba	Victor Lopez; Puerto Rico
1971 (Total)	Pastor Rodríguez; Cuba	James Benjamin; United States	José Martínez; Colombia
1975	Roberto Urrutia; Cuba	Dan Cantore; United States	Amaury Cordero; Dominican Republic
1979	Mario Ricardo Villalobos; Cuba	David Jones; United States	Garry Bratty; Canada
1983	Julio Loscos; Cuba	Francisco Alleguez; Cuba	Claude Dallaire; Canada
1987	Raúl Mora; Cuba	Víctor Echevarría; Cuba	Langis Côté; Canada
1991	Víctor Echevarría; Cuba	Eyne Acevedo; Colombia	José Medina; Venezuela
1995	Rafael Gómez; Cuba	Eyne Acevedo; Colombia	Tim McRae; United States
1999	Jonny González; Colombia	Heriberto Barbosa; Colombia	Alexi Batista; Panama
2003	Yordanis Borrero; Cuba	Amílcar Pernia; Venezuela	Aristóteles Fuentes; Cuba
2007	Yordanis Borrero; Cuba	Edwin Mosquera; Colombia	Ricardo Flores; Ecuador
2011	Israel José Rubio; Venezuela	Junior Sánchez; Venezuela	Doyler Sánchez; Colombia
2015	Luis Javier Mosquera; Colombia	Bredni Roque; Mexico	Francis Luna-Grenier; Canada
2019	Julio Mayora; Venezuela	Luis Javier Mosquera; Colombia	Julio Cedeño; Dominican Republic
2023 kg	Julio Mayora; Venezuela	Luis Javier Mosquera; Colombia	Jorge Cárdenas; Mexico

=== Middleweight ===
- 67.5–75 kg (1951–1991)
- 70–76 kg (1995)
- 69–77 kg (1999–2015)
- 73–81 kg (2019)

Games	Gold	Silver	Bronze
1951	Pete George; United States	Ángel Sposato; Argentina	Emerson Holder; Panama
1955	Pete George; United States	Julián Suárez; Cuba	Don Heron; Jamaica
1959	Tommy Kono; United States	Nazih Kerbage; Argentina	(West Indies Federation) Fred Marville (WIF)
1963	Joe Puleo; United States	José Manuel Figueroa; Puerto Rico	Pierre St.-Jean; Canada
1967	Russell Knipp; United States	Koji Michi; Brazil	Luiz de Almeida; Brazil
1971 (Press)	Russell Knipp; United States	Abel López; Cuba	Keith Adams; Canada
1971 (Snatch)	Abel López; Cuba	Russell Knipp; United States	Stanley Bailey; Trinidad and Tobago
1971 (Clean & jerk)	Russell Knipp; United States	Abel López; Cuba	Stanley Bailey; Trinidad and Tobago
1971 (Total)	Russell Knipp; United States	Abel López; Cuba	Stanley Bailey; Trinidad and Tobago
1975	Ignacio Guanche; Cuba	James Napier; United States	Daniel Robitaille; Canada
1979	Roberto Urrutia; Cuba	Eric Rogers; Canada	Rogelio Weatherbee; Mexico
1983	Julio Echenique; Cuba	Jacques Demers; Canada	Cal Schake; United States
1987	Pablo Lara; Cuba	Francisco Alleguez; Cuba	Roberto Urrutia; United States
1991	Pablo Lara; Cuba	Álvaro Velasco; Colombia	Jorge Kassar; Venezuela
1995	Pablo Lara; Cuba	Álvaro Velasco; Colombia	Walter Llerena; Ecuador
1999	Idalberto Aranda; Cuba	Walter Llerena; Ecuador	Oscar Chaplin III; United States
2003	Chad Vaughn; United States	Ferney Manzano; Colombia	Octavio Mejías; Venezuela
2007	Iván Cambar; Cuba	José Ocando; Venezuela	Octavio Mejías; Venezuela
2011	Iván Cambar; Cuba	Ricardo Flores; Ecuador	Chad Vaughn; United States
2015	Addriel Garcia Lao; Cuba	Junior Sánchez; Venezuela	Jhor Moreno; Colombia
2019	Brayan Rodallegas; Colombia	Zacarías Bonnat; Dominican Republic	Harrison Maurus; United States

=== Light-heavyweight ===
- 75–82.5 kg (1951–1991)
- 76–83 kg (1995)
- 77–85 kg (1999–2015)

Games	Gold	Silver	Bronze
1951	Stanley Stanczyk; United States	Osvaldo Forte; Argentina	Orlando Garrido; Cuba
1955	Tommy Kono; United States	Osvaldo Forte; Argentina	Julian Pemberton; Netherlands Antilles
1959	Jim George; United States	Enrique Guittens; Venezuela	Fernando Torres; Puerto Rico
1963	Tommy Kono; United States	Fortunato Rijna; Netherlands Antilles	Mike Lipari; Canada
1967	Joe Puleo; United States	Víctor Ángel Pagán; Puerto Rico	Pierre St.-Jean; Canada
1971 (Press)	Juan Curbelo; Cuba	Mike Karchut; United States	Víctor Ángel Pagán; Puerto Rico
1971 (Snatch)	Mike Karchut; United States	Juan Curbelo; Cuba	Víctor Ángel Pagán; Puerto Rico
1971 (Clean & jerk)	Mike Karchut; United States	Juan Curbelo; Cuba	Luiz de Almeida; Brazil
1971 (Total)	Mike Karchut; United States	Juan Curbelo; Cuba	Víctor Ángel Pagán; Puerto Rico
1975	Lee James; United States	Abel López; Cuba	Pablo Justiniani; Panama
1979	Julio Echenique; Cuba	Thomas Hirtz; United States	Ricardo Sequera; Venezuela
1983	Enrique Sabari; Cuba	David Muñoz; Mexico	Gilles Poirier; Canada
1987	Pedro Rodriguez; Cuba	William Letriz; Puerto Rico	Guy Greavette; Canada
1991	Emilio Lara; Cuba	Julio Luna; Venezuela	Dean Goad; United States
1995	Julio Luna; Venezuela	Eduardo Moreno; Cuba	Erlyn Mena; Colombia
1999	Álvaro Velasco; Colombia	José Llerena; Ecuador	Tim McRae; United States
2003	Héctor Ballesteros; Colombia	Yoandry Hernández; Cuba	José Oliver Ruiz; Colombia
2007	José Oliver Ruiz; Colombia	Jadier Valladares; Cuba	Herbys Márquez; Venezuela
2011	Yoelmis Hernández; Cuba	Carlos Andica; Colombia	Kendrick Farris; United States
2015	Yoelmis Hernández; Cuba	Yadier Nuñez; Cuba	Juan Ruiz Morelos; Colombia

=== Middle-heavyweight ===
- 82.5 kg–90 kg (1955–1991)
- 83–91 kg (1995)
- 85–94 kg (1999–2015)
- 81–96 kg (2019–)

Games	Gold	Silver	Bronze
1955	Dave Sheppard; United States	Bruno Barabani; Brazil	Carlos Seigelshifer; Argentina
1959	Clyde Emrich; United States	Philome Laguerre; Haiti	Adolph Williams; British Guiana
1963	Bill March; United States	José Flores; Netherlands Antilles	John Lewis; Canada
1967	Phil Grippaldi; United States	Paul Bjarnason; Canada	Andrés Martínez; Cuba
1971 (Press)	Phil Grippaldi; United States	Fortunato Rijna; Netherlands Antilles	Juan Benavides; Cuba
1971 (Snatch)	Rick Holbrook; United States	Phil Grippaldi; United States	Wayne Wilson; Canada
1971 (Clean & jerk)	Rick Holbrook; United States	Phil Grippaldi; United States	Wayne Wilson; Canada
1971 (Total)	Phil Grippaldi; United States	Rick Holbrook; United States	Wayne Wilson; Canada
1975	Phil Grippaldi; United States	Alberto Blanco; Cuba	Frank Capsouras; United States
1979	Daniel Zayas; Cuba	Terry Hadlow; Canada	Nelson Carvalho; Brazil
1983	Ciro Ibáñez; Cuba	Mario Parente; Canada	Jaime Molina; Peru
1987	Omar Semanat; Cuba	Gill Paramjit; Canada	Tommy Calandro; United States
1991	Pedro Rodríguez; Cuba	Brett Brian; United States	Paul Flescher; United States
1995	Carlos Hernández; Cuba	Darío Lecman; Argentina	Tom Gough; United States
1999	Carlos Hernández; Cuba	Darío Lecman; Argentina	Julio Luna; Venezuela
2003	Julio Luna; Venezuela	Darío Lecman; Argentina	Jairo Cossio; Colombia
2007	Yoandry Hernández; Cuba	Julio Luna; Venezuela	Herman Torres; Colombia
2011	Javier Venega; Cuba	Herbys Márquez; Venezuela	Eduardo Guadamud; Ecuador
2015	Kendrick Farris; United States	Norik Vardanian; United States	Javier Vanega; Cuba
2019	Jhonatan Rivas; Colombia	Boady Santavy; Canada	Keydomar Vallenilla; Venezuela

=== First-heavyweight ===
- 90–100 kg (1979–1991)
- 91–99 kg (1995)

Games	Gold	Silver	Bronze
1979	Alberto Blanco; Cuba	Guy Carlton; United States	Jacques Oliger; Chile
1983	Michael Davis; United States	José Miguel Guzman; Dominican Republic	None
1987	Denis Garon; Canada	Ken Clark; United States	Brett Brian; United States
1991	Omar Semanat; Cuba	Wes Barnett; United States	Edmilson Silva; Brazil
1995	Alexander Fonseca; Cuba	Claudio Henschke; Argentina	Peter Kelley; United States

=== Heavyweight ===
- +90 kg (1951–1967)
- 90–110 kg (1971–1975)
- 100–110 kg (1979–1991)
- 99–108 kg (1995)
- 94–105 kg (1999–2015)
- 96–109 kg (2019–)

Games	Gold	Silver	Bronze
1951	John Davis; United States	Lennox Kilgour; Trinidad and Tobago	Norberto Ferreira; Argentina
1955	Norbert Schemansky; United States	Humberto Selvetti; Argentina	Bèto Adriana; Netherlands Antilles
1959	Dave Ashman; United States	Humberto Selvetti; Argentina	Bèto Adriana; Netherlands Antilles
1963	Sydney Henry; United States	Brandon Bailey; Trinidad and Tobago	Bèto Adriana; Netherlands Antilles
1967	Joseph Dube; United States	Ernesto Varona; Cuba	Brandon Bailey; Trinidad and Tobago
1971 (Press)	Robert Kemper; United States	Gary Deal; United States	Thamer Chaim; Brazil
1971 (Snatch)	Gary Deal; United States	Robert Kemper; United States	Thamer Chaim; Brazil
1971 (Clean & jerk)	Robert Kemper; United States	Gary Deal; United States	Thamer Chaim; Brazil
1971 (Total)	Gary Deal; United States	Robert Kemper; United States	Thamer Chaim; Brazil
1975	Russ Prior; Canada	Mark Cameron; United States	Robert Santavy; Canada
1979	Mark Cameron; United States	Javier González; Cuba	Charles Nootens; United States
1983	Kevin Roy; Canada	Rolando Villamil; Panama	Calvin Stamp; Jamaica
1987	David Bolduc; Canada	Rich Schutz; United States	Robert Jones; United States
1991	Ernesto Montoya; Cuba	Rich Schutz; United States	Humberto Gómez; Colombia
1995	Wes Barnett; United States	Osvaldo Bango; Cuba	Pedro Marin; Venezuela
1999	Boris Burov; Ecuador	Michel Batista; Cuba	Wes Barnett; United States
2003	Boris Burov; Ecuador	Michel Batista; Cuba	William Solís; Colombia
2007	Joel Mackenzie; Cuba	Pedro Stetsiuk; Argentina	Damian Abbiate; Argentina
2011	Jorge Arroyo; Ecuador	Julio Luna; Venezuela	Donald Shankle; United States
2015	Jesús González; Venezuela	Mateus Gregório; Brazil	Jorge Arroyo; Ecuador
2019	Wesley Kitts; United States	Jesús González; Venezuela	Jorge Arroyo; Ecuador

=== Super heavyweight ===
- +110 kg (1971–1991)
- +108 kg (1995)
- +105 kg (1999–2015)
- +109 kg (2019–)

Games	Gold	Silver	Bronze
1971 (Press)	Ken Patera; United States	Fernando Bernal; Cuba	Price Morris; Canada
1971 (Snatch)	Ken Patera; United States	Fernando Bernal; Cuba	Price Morris; Canada
1971 (Clean & jerk)	Ken Patera; United States	Fernando Bernal; Cuba	Price Morris; Canada
1971 (Total)	Ken Patera; United States	Fernando Bernal; Cuba	Price Morris; Canada
1975	Gerardo Fernández; Cuba	Bruce Wilhelm; United States	Fernando Bernal; Cuba
1979	Thomas Stock; United States	Marc Cardinal; Canada	Jorge Gadala María; El Salvador
1983	Reynaldo Chávez; Cuba	William Boyd; Jamaica	None
1987	Mario Martinez; United States	John Bergman; United States	Calvin Stamp; Jamaica
1991	Ernesto Aguero; Cuba	Mario Martinez; United States	Jeff Michels; United States
1995	Modesto Sánchez; Cuba	Mark Henry; United States	Mario Martinez; United States
1999	Shane Hamman; United States	Cristián Escalante; Chile	Modesto Sanchez; Cuba
2003	Hidelgar Morillo; Venezuela	Cristián Escalante; Chile	Plaiter Reyes; Dominican Republic
2007	Cristián Escalante; Chile	Casey Burgener; United States	Víctor Heredia; Venezuela
2011	Fernando Reis; Brazil	Yoel Morales; Venezuela	George Kobaladze; Canada
2015	Fernando Reis; Brazil	George Kobaladze; Canada	Fernando Salas; Ecuador
2019	Fernando Reis; Brazil	Luis Lauret; Cuba	Raúl Manríquez; Mexico

== Women's competition ==
=== Flyweight ===
- 48 kg (1999–2015)
- 49 kg (2019–)

Games	Gold	Silver	Bronze
1999	Tara Nott; United States	Leddy Zuluaga; Colombia	Guillermina Candelario; Dominican Republic
2003	Tara Nott; United States	Guillermina Candelario; Dominican Republic	Remigia Arcila; Venezuela
2007	Carolina Valencia; Mexico	Betsi Rivas; Venezuela	Guillermina Candelario; Dominican Republic
2011	Lely Burgos; Puerto Rico	Betsi Rivas; Venezuela	Katherine Mercado; Colombia
2015	Cándida Vásquez; Dominican Republic	Ana Iris Segura; Colombia	Beatriz Pirón; Dominican Republic
2019	Beatriz Pirón; Dominican Republic	Ana Iris Segura; Colombia	Santa Cotes; Dominican Republic

=== Featherweight ===
- 53 kg (1999–2015)
- 55 kg (2019–)

Games	Gold	Silver	Bronze
1999	Robin Goad; United States	Nancy Maneiro; Venezuela	Luz Gallego; Colombia
2003	Mabel Mosquera; Colombia	Yuderqui Contreras; Dominican Republic	Wendy Amparo; Dominican Republic
2007	Yuderqui Contreras; Dominican Republic	Ana Margot Lemos; Colombia	Melanie Roach; United States
2011	Yuderqui Contreras; Dominican Republic	Inmara Henríquez; Venezuela	Francia Peñuñuri; Mexico
2015	Rusmeris Villar; Colombia	Génesis Rodríguez; Venezuela	Yafreisy Silvestre; Dominican Republic
2019	Génesis Rodríguez; Venezuela	Yenny Sinisterra; Colombia	Ana López Ferrer; Mexico

=== Lightweight ===
- 58 kg (1999–2015)
- 59 kg (2019–)

Games	Gold	Silver	Bronze
1999	Maryse Turcotte; Canada	Nancy Niro; Canada	Soraya Jiménez; Mexico
2003	Alexandra Escobar; Ecuador	Soraya Jiménez; Mexico	Gretty Lugo; Venezuela
2007	Alexandra Escobar; Ecuador	Rusmeris Villar; Colombia	María Cecilia Floriddia; Argentina
2011	Alexandra Escobar; Ecuador	Jackelina Heredia; Colombia	Lina Rivas; Colombia
2015	Lina Rivas; Colombia	Yusleidy Figueroa; Venezuela	Quisia Guicho; Mexico
2019	María Lobón; Colombia	Alexandra Escobar; Ecuador	Yusleidy Figueroa; Venezuela

=== Middleweight ===
- 63 kg (1999–2015)
- 64 kg (2019–)

Games	Gold	Silver	Bronze
1999	Meil McGerrigle; Canada	Alejandra Perea; Colombia	Sención Quezada; Dominican Republic
2003	Ubaldina Valoyes; Colombia	Solenny Villasmil; Venezuela	Luz Mercedes; Mexico
2007	Leydi Solís; Colombia	Christine Girard; Canada	Natalie Woolfolk; United States
2011	Christine Girard; Canada	Nisida Palomeque; Colombia	Luz Acosta; Mexico
2015	Mercedes Pérez; Colombia	Marina Rodríguez; Cuba	Bruna Nascimento Piloto; Brazil
2019	Mercedes Pérez; Colombia	Mattie Sasser; United States	Angie Palacios; Ecuador

=== Light-heavyweight ===
- 69 kg (1999–2015)
- 76 kg (2019–)

Games	Gold	Silver	Bronze
1999	Lea Foreman; United States	Miosotis Heredia; Dominican Republic	Eva María Dimas; El Salvador
2003	Tulia Medina; Colombia	Eva María Dimas; El Salvador	Miosotis Heredia; Dominican Republic
2007	Tulia Medina; Colombia	Cinthya Domínguez; Mexico	Vanessa Nuñez; Venezuela
2011	Mercedes Pérez; Colombia	Cinthya Domínguez; Mexico	Aremi Fuentes; Mexico
2015	Leydi Solís; Colombia	Neisi Dájomes; Ecuador	Aremi Fuentes; Mexico
2019	Neisi Dájomes; Ecuador	Aremi Fuentes; Mexico	Katherine Nye; United States

=== Heavyweight ===
- 75 kg (1999–2015)
- 87 kg (2019–)

Games	Gold	Silver	Bronze
1999	Wanda Rijo; Dominican Republic	Cara Heads; United States	Jeane Lassen; Canada
2003	Wanda Rijo; Dominican Republic	Nora Köppel; Argentina	Raquel López; Venezuela
2007	Ubaldina Valoyes; Colombia	Damaris Aguirre; Mexico	Eva Dimas; El Salvador
2011	Ubaldina Valoyes; Colombia	María Valdés; Chile	Maria Alvarez; Venezuela
2015	Ubaldina Valoyes; Colombia	María Valdés; Chile	Jaqueline Ferreira; Brazil
2019	María Valdés; Chile	Crismery Santana; Dominican Republic	Tamara Salazar; Ecuador

=== Super-heavyweight ===
- +75 kg (1999–2015)
- +87 kg (2019–)

Games	Gold	Silver	Bronze
1999	Cheryl Haworth; United States	María Isabel Urrutia; Colombia	Carmenza Delgado; Colombia
2003	Carmenza Delgado; Colombia	Oliba Nieve; Ecuador	María Carvajal; Dominican Republic
2007	Oliba Nieve; Ecuador	Emmy Vargas; United States	Yinely Burgos; Dominican Republic
2011	Oliba Nieve; Ecuador	Yaniuska Espinosa; Venezuela	Tania Mascorro; Mexico
2015	Yaniuska Espinosa; Venezuela	Naryury Pérez; Venezuela	Oliba Nieve; Ecuador
2019	Sarah Robles; United States	Verónica Saladín; Dominican Republic	Lisseth Ayoví; Ecuador
