= Weightlifting at the 1971 Pan American Games =

Weightlifting was one of the sports contested at the 1971 Pan American Games in Cali, Colombia. In this edition, four sets of medals were awarded for each weight. It was the last games in which clean and press was performed, as it was eliminated for the weightlifting competition next year.

== Men's competition ==
=== Press ===
==== Flyweight (– 52 kg) ====
RANK	FINAL
Gold medal	Roberto Lindeborg (AHO)
Silver medal	Chun Hon Chan (CAN)
Bronze medal	A. Garcia (PUR)

==== Bantamweight (– 56 kg) ====
RANK	FINAL
Gold medal	Fernando Báez Cruz (PUR)
Silver medal	Anthony Phillips (BAR)
Bronze medal	Rolando Chang (CUB)

==== Featherweight (– 60 kg) ====
RANK	FINAL
Gold medal	Manuel Mateos (MEX)
Silver medal	Idelfonso Lee (PAN)
Bronze medal	Ignacio Guanche (CUB)

==== Lightweight (– 67.5 kg) ====
RANK	FINAL
Gold medal	José Martínez (COL)
Silver medal	Pastor Rodríguez (CUB)
Bronze medal	Cipriano Gutierrez (COL)

==== Middleweight (– 75 kg) ====
RANK	FINAL
Gold medal	Russell Knipp (USA)
Silver medal	Abel López (CUB)
Bronze medal	Keith Adams (CAN)

==== Light-heavyweight (– 82.5 kg) ====
RANK	FINAL
Gold medal	Juan Curbelo (CUB)
Silver medal	Michael Karchut (USA)
Bronze medal	Ángel Pagán (PUR)

==== Middle-heavyweight (– 90 kg) ====
RANK	FINAL
Gold medal	Phillip Grippaldi (USA)
Silver medal	Fortunato Rijna (AHO)
Bronze medal	Juan Benavides (CUB)

==== Heavyweight (– 110 kg) ====
RANK	FINAL
Gold medal	Robert Kemper (USA)
Silver medal	Gary Deal (USA)
Bronze medal	Thamer Chaim (BRA)

==== Super heavyweight (+ 110 kg) ====
RANK	FINAL
Gold medal	Ken Patera (USA)
Silver medal	Fernando Bernal (CUB)
Bronze medal	Price Morris (CAN)

=== Snatch ===
==== Flyweight (– 52 kg) ====
RANK	FINAL
Gold medal	Chun Hon Chan (CAN)
Silver medal	Juan Romero (COL)
Bronze medal	Lester Francel (COL)

==== Bantamweight (– 56 kg) ====
RANK	FINAL
Gold medal	Rolando Chang (CUB)
Silver medal	Carlos Lastre (CUB)
Bronze medal	Jesus Conde (MEX)

==== Featherweight (– 60 kg) ====
RANK	FINAL
Gold medal	Idelfonso Lee (PAN)
Silver medal	Ignacio Guanche (CUB)
Bronze medal	Manuel Mateos (MEX)

==== Lightweight (– 67.5 kg) ====
RANK	FINAL
Gold medal	Pastor Rodríguez (CUB)
Silver medal	Victor Lopez (PUR)
Bronze medal	James Benjamin (USA)

==== Middleweight (– 75 kg) ====
RANK	FINAL
Gold medal	Abel López (CUB)
Silver medal	Russell Knipp (USA)
Bronze medal	Stanley Bailey (TTO)

==== Light-heavyweight (– 82.5 kg) ====
RANK	FINAL
Gold medal	Michael Karchut (USA)
Silver medal	Juan Curbelo (CUB)
Bronze medal	Ángel Pagán (PUR)

==== Middle-heavyweight (– 90 kg) ====
RANK	FINAL
Gold medal	Patrick Holbrook (USA)
Silver medal	Phillip Grippaldi (USA)
Bronze medal	Wayne Wilson (CAN)

==== Heavyweight (– 110 kg) ====
RANK	FINAL
Gold medal	Gary Deal (USA)
Silver medal	Robert Kemper (USA)
Bronze medal	Thamer Chaim (BRA)

==== Super heavyweight (+ 110 kg) ====
RANK	FINAL
Gold medal	Ken Patera (USA)
Silver medal	Fernando Bernal (CUB)
Bronze medal	Price Morris (CAN)

=== Clean and Jerk ===
==== Flyweight (– 52 kg) ====
RANK	FINAL
Gold medal	Juan Romero (COL)
Silver medal	Lester Francel (COL)
Bronze medal	Roberto Lindeborg (AHO)

==== Bantamweight (– 56 kg) ====
RANK	FINAL
Gold medal	Rolando Chang (CUB)
Silver medal	Carlos Lastre (CUB)
Bronze medal	Fernando Báez Cruz (PUR)

==== Featherweight (– 60 kg) ====
RANK	FINAL
Gold medal	Manuel Mateos (MEX)
Silver medal	Ignacio Guanche (CUB)
Bronze medal	Carlos Suarez (COL)

==== Lightweight (– 67.5 kg) ====
RANK	FINAL
Gold medal	James Benjamin (USA)
Silver medal	Pastor Rodríguez (CUB)
Bronze medal	Victor Lopez (PUR)

==== Middleweight (– 75 kg) ====
RANK	FINAL
Gold medal	Russell Knipp (USA)
Silver medal	Abel López (CUB)
Bronze medal	Stanley Bailey (TTO)

==== Light-heavyweight (– 82.5 kg) ====
RANK	FINAL
Gold medal	Michael Karchut (USA)
Silver medal	Juan Curbelo (CUB)
Bronze medal	Luiz de Almeida (BRA)

==== Middle-heavyweight (– 90 kg) ====
RANK	FINAL
Gold medal	Patrick Holbrook (USA)
Silver medal	Phillip Grippaldi (USA)
Bronze medal	Wayne Wilson (CAN)

==== Heavyweight (– 110 kg) ====
RANK	FINAL
Gold medal	Robert Kemper (USA)
Silver medal	Gary Deal (USA)
Bronze medal	Thamer Chaim (BRA)

==== Super heavyweight (+ 110 kg) ====
RANK	FINAL
Gold medal	Ken Patera (USA)
Silver medal	Fernando Bernal (CUB)
Bronze medal	Price Morris (CAN)

=== Total ===
==== Flyweight (– 52 kg) ====
RANK	FINAL
Gold medal	Juan Romero (COL)
Silver medal	Roberto Lindeborg (AHO)
Bronze medal	Chun Hon Chan (CAN)

==== Bantamweight (– 56 kg) ====
RANK	FINAL
Gold medal	Rolando Chang (CUB)
Silver medal	Fernando Báez Cruz (PUR)
Bronze medal	Carlos Lastre (CUB)

==== Featherweight (– 60 kg) ====
RANK	FINAL
Gold medal	Manuel Mateos (MEX)
Silver medal	Ignacio Guanche (CUB)
Bronze medal	Idelfonso Lee (PAN)

==== Lightweight (– 67.5 kg) ====
RANK	FINAL
Gold medal	Pastor Rodríguez (CUB)
Silver medal	James Benjamin (USA)
Bronze medal	José Martínez (COL)

==== Middleweight (– 75 kg) ====
RANK	FINAL
Gold medal	Russell Knipp (USA)
Silver medal	Abel López (CUB)
Bronze medal	Stanley Bailey (TTO)

==== Light-heavyweight (– 82.5 kg) ====
RANK	FINAL
Gold medal	Michael Karchut (USA)
Silver medal	Juan Curbelo (CUB)
Bronze medal	Ángel Pagán (PUR)

==== Middle-heavyweight (– 90 kg) ====
RANK	FINAL
Gold medal	Phillip Grippaldi (USA)
Silver medal	Patrick Holbrook (USA)
Bronze medal	Wayne Wilson (CAN)

==== Heavyweight (– 110 kg) ====
RANK	FINAL
Gold medal	Gary Deal (USA)
Silver medal	Robert Kemper (USA)
Bronze medal	Thamer Chaim (BRA)

==== Super heavyweight (+ 110 kg) ====
RANK	FINAL
Gold medal	Ken Patera (USA)
Silver medal	Fernando Bernal (CUB)
Bronze medal	Price Morris (CAN)

== Medal table ==
Rank	Nation	Gold	Silver	Bronze	Total
1	United States	19	10	1	30
2	Cuba	7	17	4	28
3	Colombia	3	2	4	9
4	Mexico	3	0	2	5
5	Puerto Rico	1	2	6	9
6	Netherlands Antilles	1	2	1	4
7	Canada	1	1	9	11
8	Panama	1	1	1	3
9	Barbados	0	1	0	1
10	Brazil	0	0	5	5
11	Trinidad and Tobago	0	0	3	3
Totals (11 entries)		36	36	36	108
