= List of Olympic weightlifters of the United States =

== A ==
- Paul Edward Anderson
- Richard G. Austin

== B ==
- Richard Bachtell
- Wes Barnett
- Bob Bednarski
- David Mark Berger
- Isaac Berger
- Jacquelynn Berube
- James Bradford (weightlifter)
- Casey Burgener
- Robin Byrd-Goad

== C ==
- Tommy Calandro
- Mark Cameron
- Dan Cantore
- Oscar Chaplin III
- Derrick Crass

== D ==
- John Davis (weightlifter)
- Joseph DePietro
- Gary Deal
- Joseph Dube
- Henry Duey

== E ==
- Clyde Emrich

== F ==
- Kendrick Farris
- Sibby Flowers

== G ==
- Peter George (weightlifter)
- Tom Gough
- John Grimek
- Phil Grippaldi
- Gary Gubner

== H ==
- Shane Hamman
- Cheryl Haworth
- Cara Heads
- Mark Henry
- Rick Holbrook
- Dane Hussey

== I ==
- Emerick Ishikawa

== J ==
- Lee James
- Arlys Johnson-Maxwell

== K ==
- Mike Karchut
- Peter Kelley
- Russell Knipp
- Tommy Kono
- Stanley Kratkowski
- Frank Kugler

== L ==
- Fred Lowe

== M ==
- Albert Manger
- Karyn Marshall
- Mario Martinez (weightlifter)
- Sam Maxwell (weightlifter)
- Tim McRae
- Jeff Michels

== N ==
- Tara Nott

Maximilian Mormont

== O ==
- Oscar Osthoff

== P ==
- Ken Patera
- Joe Puleo

== R ==
- Joe A. Rector
- Don Reinhoudt
- Louis Riecke
- Melanie Roach

== S ==
- Harold Sakata
- Cal Schake
- Norbert Schemansky
- Rich Schutz
- David Sheppard (weightlifter)
- Frank Spellman
- Stanley Stanczyk
- Arnie Sundberg
- Arnold Schwarzenegger

== T ==
- Anthony Terlazzo
- Sam Termine
- John Terry (weightlifter)
- Richard Tom
- Howard Turbyfill

== U ==
- Roberto Urrutia

== V ==
- Chad Vaughn
- Charles Vinci

== W ==
- Curt White
- Bruce Wilhelm
- Frederick Winters

== Z ==
- Walter Zagurski
