= Weightlifting at the 1975 Pan American Games =

Weightlifting was one of the sports contested at the 1975 Pan American Games in Mexico City, Mexico. There were nine weight categories with medals awarded in each.

== Men's events ==
Event	Gold	Silver	Bronze
52 kg	Francisco Casamayor; Cuba	Narcisco Orán; Panama	Lázaro de la Cruz; Dominican Republic
56 kg	Carlos Lastre; Cuba	Paulo de Sene; Brazil	Fernando Báez Cruz; Puerto Rico
60 kg	Rolando Chang; Cuba	Andrés Santoyo; Mexico	Elkin Velázquez; Colombia
67.5 kg	Roberto Urrutia; Cuba	Daniel Cantore; United States	Amaury Cordero; Dominican Republic
75 kg	Ignacio Guanche; Cuba	James Napier; United States	Daniel Robitaille; Canada
82.5 kg	Lee James; United States	Abel López; Cuba	Pablo Justiniani; Panama
90 kg	Phillip Grippaldi; United States	Alberto Blanco; Cuba	Frank Capsouras; United States
110 kg	Russell Prior; Canada	Mark Cameron; United States	Robert Santavy; Canada
+110 kg	Gerardo Fernández; Cuba	Bruce Wilhelm; United States	Fernando Bernal; Cuba

== Medal table ==
Rank	Nation	Gold	Silver	Bronze	Total
1	Cuba	6	2	1	9
2	United States	2	4	1	7
3	Canada	1	0	2	3
4	Panama	0	1	1	2
5	Brazil	0	1	0	1
5	Mexico	0	1	0	1
7	Dominican Republic	0	0	2	2
8	Colombia	0	0	1	1
8	Puerto Rico	0	0	1	1
Totals (9 entries)		9	9	9	27
