= Weightlifting at the 1963 Pan American Games =

Weightlifting at the 1963 Pan American Games refers to the weightlifting events of the 1963 Pan American Games. Well-known Japanese-American weightlifter Tommy Kono won his third-consecutive gold metal in his weight class after doing so at both the 1955 and 1959 Pan-American Games.

== Men's competition ==
=== – 56 kg ===
RANK	FINAL
Gold medal	Martin Dias (BGU)
Silver medal	Hector Curiel (AHO)
Bronze medal	Gary Hanson (USA)
4.	Fernando Bacz (PUR)
5.	Yok Sun Tan (CAN)
6.	Valdomiro Pessanha (BRA)
6.	Arnaldo Moncada (ECU)

=== – 60 kg ===
RANK	FINAL
Gold medal	Isaac Berger (USA)
Silver medal	Pedro Serrano (PUR)
Bronze medal	Idelfonso Lee (PAN)
4.	Winstone Bourne (BAR)
5.	Mauro Alaniz (MEX)
6.	Francisco Sanchez (VEN)
7.	Gleide Morriz (TRI)
8.	Ezequiel Pascual (ARG)
9.	Paulo Quero (BRA)
10.	Ramon Valverde (ECU)

=== – 67.5 kg ===
RANK	FINAL
Gold medal	Anthony Garcy (USA)
Silver medal	Rudy Monk (AHO)
Bronze medal	Roudolph Cox (BAR)
4.	Vitor Pagan (PUR)
5.	Hugo Gittens (TRI)
6.	Frank McGregor (PAN)
7.	Luis Almeida (BRA)

=== – 75 kg ===
RANK	FINAL
Gold medal	Joseph Puleo (USA)
Silver medal	José Manuel Figueroa (PUR)
Bronze medal	Pierre St.-Jean (CAN)

=== – 82.5 kg ===
RANK	FINAL
Gold medal	Tommy Kono (USA)
Silver medal	Fortunato Rijna (AHO)
Bronze medal	Michel Lipari (CAN)

=== – 90 kg ===
RANK	FINAL
Gold medal	Bill March (USA)
Silver medal	José Flores (AHO)
Bronze medal	John Lewis (CAN)

=== + 90 kg ===
RANK	FINAL
Gold medal	Sydney Henry (USA)
Silver medal	Brandon Bailey (TRI)
Bronze medal	Bèto Adriana (AHO)

== Medal table ==
Rank	Nation	Gold	Silver	Bronze	Total
1	United States	6	0	1	7
2	Guyana	1	0	0	1
3	Netherlands Antilles	0	4	1	5
4	Puerto Rico	0	2	0	2
5	Trinidad and Tobago	0	1	0	1
6	Canada	0	0	3	3
7	Barbados	0	0	1	1
7	Panama	0	0	1	1
Totals (8 entries)		7	7	7	21
