= Weightlifting at the 1967 Pan American Games =

Weightlifting was one of the sports contested at the 1967 Pan American Games in Winnipeg, Manitoba, Canada. In this edition, there were seven weight categories with medals awarded in each.

== Men's competition ==
=== Bantamweight (– 56 kg) ===
RANK	FINAL
Gold medal	Fernando Báez Cruz (PUR)
Silver medal	Anthony Phillips (BAR)
Bronze medal	Martin Dias (GUY)

=== Featherweight (– 60 kg) ===
RANK	FINAL
Gold medal	Walter Imahara (USA)
Silver medal	Manuel Mateos (MEX)
Bronze medal	Idelfonso Lee (PAN)

=== Lightweight (– 67.5 kg) ===
RANK	FINAL
Gold medal	Pastor Rodríguez (CUB)
Silver medal	Hugo Gittens (TRI)
Bronze medal	Arnaldo Muñoz (CUB)

=== Middleweight (– 75 kg) ===
RANK	FINAL
Gold medal	Russell Knipp (USA)
Silver medal	Koji Michi (BRA)
Bronze medal	Luiz de Almeida (BRA)

=== Light-heavyweight (– 82.5 kg) ===
RANK	FINAL
Gold medal	Joseph Puleo (USA)
Silver medal	Ángel Pagán (PUR)
Bronze medal	Pierre St.-Jean (CAN)

=== Middle-heavyweight (– 90 kg) ===
RANK	FINAL
Gold medal	Phillip Grippaldi (USA)
Silver medal	Paul Bjarnason (CAN)
Bronze medal	Andrés Martínez (CUB)

=== Heavyweight (+ 90 kg) ===
RANK	FINAL
Gold medal	Joseph Dube (USA)
Silver medal	Ernesto Varona (CUB)
Bronze medal	Brandon Bailey (TRI)

== Medal table ==
Rank	Nation	Gold	Silver	Bronze	Total
1	United States	5	0	0	5
2	Cuba	1	1	2	4
3	Puerto Rico	1	1	0	2
4	Brazil	0	1	1	2
4	Canada	0	1	1	2
4	Trinidad and Tobago	0	1	1	2
7	Barbados	0	1	0	1
7	Mexico	0	1	0	1
9	Guyana	0	0	1	1
9	Panama	0	0	1	1
Totals (10 entries)		7	7	7	21
