= Weightlifting at the 1979 Pan American Games =

Weightlifting was one of the sports contested at the 1979 Pan American Games in San Juan, Puerto Rico. There were ten weight categories with medals awarded in each.

== Men's events ==
| Event | Gold | Silver | Bronze |
|---|---|---|---|
| 52 kg | Francisco Casamayor Fals; Cuba | José Díaz López; Panama | Samuel Alexis Vázquez; Venezuela |
| 56 kg | Daniel Núñez; Cuba | Lázaro de la Cruz; Dominican Republic | Francisco Benítez; Mexico |
| 60 kg | Víctor Pérez; Cuba | Phillip Sanderson; United States | Ángel García; Dominican Republic |
| 67.5 kg | Mario Ricardo Villalobos; Cuba | David Jones; United States | Garry Bratty; Canada |
| 75 kg | Roberto Urrutia; Cuba | Eric Rogers; Canada | Rogelio Weatherbee; Mexico |
| 82.5 kg | Julio Echenique González; Cuba | Thomas Hirtz; United States | Ricardo Sequera; Venezuela |
| 90 kg | Daniel Zayas Díaz; Cuba | Terry Hadlow; Canada | Nelson Carvalho; Brazil |
| 100 kg | Alberto Blanco Fernández; Cuba | Guy Carlton; United States | Jacques Oliger; Chile |
| 110 kg | Mark Cameron; United States | Javier González; Cuba | Charles Nootens; United States |
| +110 kg | Tom Stock; United States | Marc Cardinal; Canada | Jorge Gadala María; El Salvador |

== Medal table ==
| Rank | Nation | Gold | Silver | Bronze | Total |
|---|---|---|---|---|---|
| 1 | Cuba | 8 | 1 | 0 | 9 |
| 2 | United States | 2 | 4 | 1 | 7 |
| 3 | Canada | 0 | 3 | 1 | 4 |
| 4 | Dominican Republic | 0 | 1 | 1 | 2 |
| 5 | Panama | 0 | 1 | 0 | 1 |
| 6 | Mexico | 0 | 0 | 2 | 2 |
| 6 | Venezuela | 0 | 0 | 2 | 2 |
| 8 | Brazil | 0 | 0 | 1 | 1 |
| 8 | Chile | 0 | 0 | 1 | 1 |
| 8 | El Salvador | 0 | 0 | 1 | 1 |
| Totals (10 entries) | | 10 | 10 | 10 | 30 |
