= Weightlifting at the 1951 Pan American Games =

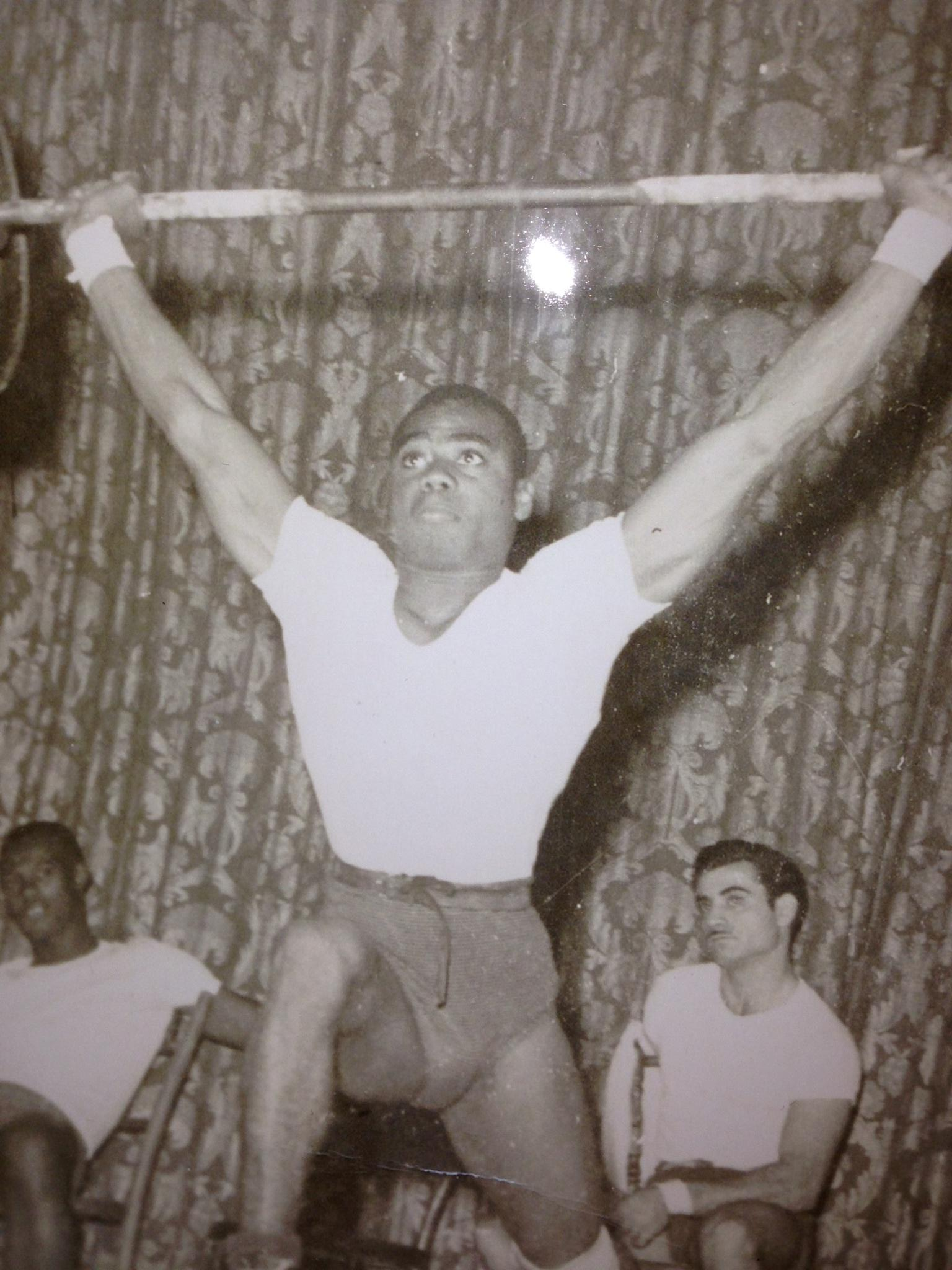
Joseph Charlot, winner of the bronze medal in the Featherweight class

The first Pan American Games in Buenos Aires in 1951 included weightlifting competitions in various weight categories. The U.S. athlete John Davis won the heavyweight event.

== Men's competition ==
=== Bantamweight (− 56 kg) ===
RANK	FINAL
Gold medal	Joseph DePietro (USA)
Silver medal	José Crespo (CUB)
Bronze medal	Marcelino Salas (MEX)

=== Featherweight (− 60 kg) ===
RANK	FINAL
Gold medal	Rodney Wilkes (TRI)
Silver medal	Richard Greenawalt (USA)
Bronze medal	Joseph Charlot (HAI)

=== Lightweight (− 67.5 kg) ===
RANK	FINAL
Gold medal	Joe Pitman (USA)
Silver medal	Carl de Souza (TRI)
Bronze medal	Hugo d'Atri (ARG)

=== Middleweight (− 75 kg) ===
RANK	FINAL
Gold medal	Peter George (USA)
Silver medal	Ángel Sposato (ARG)
Bronze medal	Emerson Holder (PAN)

=== Light-heavyweight (− 82.5 kg) ===
RANK	FINAL
Gold medal	Stanley Stanczyk (USA)
Silver medal	Osvaldo Forte (ARG)
Bronze medal	Orlando Garrido (CUB)

=== Heavyweight (+ 82.5 kg) ===
RANK	FINAL
Gold medal	John Davis (USA)
Silver medal	Lennox Kilgour (TRI)
Bronze medal	Norberto Ferreira (ARG)

== Medal table ==
Rank	Nation	Gold	Silver	Bronze	Total
1	United States	5	1	0	6
2	Trinidad and Tobago	1	2	0	3
3	Argentina	0	2	2	4
4	Cuba	0	1	1	2
5	Haiti	0	0	1	1
5	Mexico	0	0	1	1
5	Panama	0	0	1	1
Totals (7 entries)		6	6	6	18
