= Weightlifting at the 1955 Pan American Games =

Weightlifting at the 1955 Pan American Games refers to the weightlifting events of the 1955 Pan American Games. Well-known Japanese-American weightlifter Tommy Kono won the gold metal in his weight class.

== Men's competition ==
=== Bantamweight (− 56 kg) ===
RANK	FINAL
Gold medal	Charles Vinci (USA)
Silver medal	Angel Famiglietti (PAN)
Bronze medal	Ignacio Suárez (CUB)

=== Featherweight (− 60 kg) ===
RANK	FINAL
Gold medal	Carlos Chávez (PAN)
Silver medal	Yas Kuzuhara (USA)
Bronze medal	Edmundo Álvarez (MEX)

=== Lightweight (− 67.5 kg) ===
RANK	FINAL
Gold medal	Joe Pitman (USA)
Silver medal	Ambrose Cornet (AHO)
Bronze medal	Emilio González (ARG)

=== Middleweight (− 75 kg) ===
RANK	FINAL
Gold medal	Peter George (USA)
Silver medal	Julián Suárez (CUB)
Bronze medal	Don Heron (JAM)

=== Light-heavyweight (− 82.5 kg) ===
RANK	FINAL
Gold medal	Tommy Kono (USA)
Silver medal	Osvaldo Forte (ARG)
Bronze medal	Julian Pemberton (AHO)

=== Middle-heavyweight (− 90 kg) ===
RANK	FINAL
Gold medal	Dave Sheppard (USA)
Silver medal	Bruno Barabani (BRA)
Bronze medal	Carlos Seigeshifer (ARG)

=== Heavyweight (+ 90 kg) ===
RANK	FINAL
Gold medal	Norbert Shemansky (USA)
Silver medal	Humberto Selvetti (ARG)
Bronze medal	Bèto Adriana (AHO)

== Medal table ==
Rank	Nation	Gold	Silver	Bronze	Total
1	United States	6	1	0	7
2	Panama	1	1	0	2
3	Argentina	0	2	2	4
4	Netherlands Antilles	0	1	2	3
5	Cuba	0	1	1	2
6	Brazil	0	1	0	1
7	Jamaica	0	0	1	1
7	Mexico	0	0	1	1
Totals (8 entries)		7	7	7	21
