= Weightlifting at the 1956 Summer Olympics – Men's 90 kg =

Weightlifting at the Olympics

Men's 90 kg at the Games of the XVI Olympiad
- Venue: Royal Exhibition Building
- Date: 26 November 1956
- Competitors: 15 from 14 nations
- Winning total: 462.5 kg WR

Medalists
1st place, gold medalist(s)		Arkady Vorobyov	Soviet Union
2nd place, silver medalist(s)		Dave Sheppard	United States
3rd place, bronze medalist(s)		Jean Debuf	France

The men's 90 kg weightlifting competitions at the 1956 Summer Olympics in Melbourne took place on 26 November at the Royal Exhibition Building. It was the second appearance of the middle heavyweight class.

== Competition format ==
Each weightlifter had three attempts at each of the three lifts. The best score for each lift was summed to give a total. The weightlifter could increase the weight between attempts (minimum of 5 kg between first and second attempts, 2.5 kg between second and third attempts) but could not decrease weight. If two or more weightlifters finished with the same total, the competitors' body weights were used as the tie-breaker (lighter athlete wins).

== Records ==
Prior to this competition, the existing world and Olympic records were as follows.

World record	Press	Tommy Kono (USA)	146 kg		1956
World record	Snatch	Arkady Vorobyov (URS)	143 kg		1956
World record	Clean & Jerk	Norbert Schemansky (USA)	181 kg		1953
World record	Total	Arkady Vorobyov (URS)	460 kg	Vienna, Austria	9 October 1954
Olympic record	Press	Grigory Novak (URS)	140 kg	Helsinki, Finland	27 July 1952
Olympic record	Snatch	Norbert Schemansky (USA)	140 kg	Helsinki, Finland	27 July 1952
Olympic record	Clean & Jerk	Norbert Schemansky (USA)	177.5 kg	Helsinki, Finland	27 July 1952
Olympic record	Total	Norbert Schemansky (USA)	445 kg	Helsinki, Finland	27 July 1952

== Results ==
Rank	Athlete	Nation	Body weight	Press (kg)				Snatch (kg)				Clean & Jerk (kg)				Total
Rank	Athlete	Nation	Body weight	1	2	3	Result	1	2	3	Result	1	2	3	Result	Total
1st place, gold medalist(s)	Arkady Vorobyov	Soviet Union	89.80	140	145	147.5	147.5 WR	137.5	~~142.5~~	~~142.5~~	137.5	170	175	177.5	177.5 =OR	462.5 WR
2nd place, silver medalist(s)	Dave Sheppard	United States	88.80	~~140~~	140	~~145~~	140	~~137.5~~	~~137.5~~	137.5	137.5	~~165~~	165	~~185~~	165	442.5
3rd place, bronze medalist(s)	Jean Debuf	France	87.60	122.5	127.5	130	130	122.5	127.5	~~130~~	127.5	162.5	167.5	–	167.5	425
4	Mohammad Hassan Rahnavardi	Iran	89.50	127.5	135	140	140	122.5	127.5	~~130~~	127.5	157.5	~~162.5~~	~~162.5~~	157.5	425
5	Ivan Veselinov	Bulgaria	88.60	127.5	132.5	~~135~~	132.5	120	~~125~~	~~125~~	120	~~155~~	155	~~160~~	155	407.5
6	Tan Kim Bee	Malaya	86.20	112.5	~~117.5~~	117.5	117.5	115	122.5	~~127.5~~	122.5	150	155	~~160~~	155	395
7	Lennox Kilgour	Trinidad and Tobago	89.10	122.5	127.5	~~132.5~~	127.5	112.5	117.5	~~122.5~~	117.5	140	145	~~150~~	145	390
8	Leonard Treganowan	Australia	89.70	~~117.5~~	117.5	122.5	122.5	117.5	~~122.5~~	~~122.5~~	117.5	~~150~~	150	~~155~~	150	390
9	Sydney Harrington	Great Britain	88.20	110	~~115~~	115	115	112.5	117.5	~~120~~	117.5	145	152.5	~~157.5~~	152.5	385
9	Manny Santos	Australia	88.20	120	125	~~130~~	125	110	~~115~~	~~115~~	110	~~150~~	150	~~160~~	150	385
11	Kamineni Eswara Rao	India	88.40	~~117.5~~	117.5	122.5	122.5	100	110	~~115~~	110	135	142.5	147.5	147.5	380
12	Bruno Barabani	Brazil	89.70	105	110	~~115~~	110	112.5	~~117.5~~	~~120~~	112.5	~~145~~	145	~~155~~	145	367.5
13	Carlos Seigelshifer	Argentina	89.50	117.5	122.5	125	125	112.5	~~117.5~~	~~117.5~~	112.5	~~150~~	~~150~~	~~150~~	–	237.5
14	Czesław Białas	Poland	89.60	130	~~135~~	~~135~~	130	~~120~~	~~125~~	~~125~~	–	Retired				130
15	Park Dong-cheol	South Korea	87.60	115	120	~~122.5~~	120	~~120~~	~~125~~	~~125~~	–	Retired				120

== New records ==
Press	147.5 kg	Arkady Vorobyov (URS)	WR
Clean & Jerk	177.5 kg	Arkady Vorobyov (URS)	=OR
Total	462.5 kg	Arkady Vorobyov (URS)	WR
