= Weightlifting at the 1972 Summer Olympics – Men's +110 kg =

Weightlifting at the Olympics

+110 kg at the Games of the XX Olympiad
- Venue: Weightlifting Hall 7, Gewichtheberhalle
- Dates: 6 September 1972
- Competitors: 13 from 11 nations

Medalists
1st place, gold medalist(s)		Vasiliy Alekseyev; Soviet Union
2nd place, silver medalist(s)		Rudolf Mang; West Germany
3rd place, bronze medalist(s)		Gerd Bonk; East Germany

This was the first time that the super heavyweight weight class was competed at an Olympics. The event was delayed one day due to the ongoing Munich massacre.

== Results ==
The results were determined by adding the points for best lifts in military press, snatch and jerk, with any ties broken by the minimum bodyweight.

=== Final ===
Rank	Name	Nationality	Body weight	Military press (kg)				Snatch (kg)				Jerk (kg)				Total (kg)
Rank	Name	Nationality	Body weight	1	2	3	Result	1	2	3	Result	1	2	3	Result	Total (kg)
1st place, gold medalist(s)	Vasiliy Alekseyev	Soviet Union	152.80	225.0	230.0	235.0	235.0 OR	170.0	175.0	~~180.0~~	175 OR	~~225.0~~	225.0	230.0	230.0 OR	640.0 OR
2nd place, silver medalist(s)	Rudolf Mang	West Germany	129.75	~~222.5~~	~~222.5~~	225.0	225.0	170.0	~~180.0~~	~~180.0~~	170.0	215.0	~~232.5~~	~~232.5~~	215.0	610.0
3rd place, bronze medalist(s)	Gerd Bonk	East Germany	142.30	~~190.0~~	190.0	200.0	200.0	150.0	155.0	~~160.0~~	155.0	210.0	~~217.5~~	217.5	217.5	572.5
4	Jouko Leppä	Finland	144.80	190.0	200.0	205.0	205.0	150.0	157.5	~~162.5~~	157.5	200.0	205.0	210.0	210.0	572.5
5	Manfred Rieger	East Germany	125.55	185.0	190.0	~~192.5~~	190.0	~~162.5~~	162.5	~~170.0~~	162.5	200.0	205.0	~~207.5~~	205.0	557.5
6	Petr Pavlásek	Czechoslovakia	150.25	185.0	192.5	~~197.5~~	192.5	155.0	160.0	165.0	165.0	200.0	~~205.0~~	~~205.0~~	200.0	557.5
7	Kalevi Lahdenranta	Finland	134.30	180.0	190.0	~~195.0~~	190.0	~~165.0~~	165.0	~~170.0~~	165.0	~~200.0~~	200.0	~~205.0~~	200.0	555.0
8	Fernando Bernal	Cuba	125.85	190.0	~~200.0~~	~~200.0~~	190.0	~~147.5~~	147.5	~~152.5~~	147.5	200.0	207.5	~~212.5~~	207.5	545.0
9	Ove Johansson	Sweden	127.95	~~200.0~~	200.0	~~205.0~~	200.0	145.0	~~150.0~~	~~150.0~~	145.0	~~200.0~~	~~200.0~~	200.0	200.0	545.0
10	Terry Perdue	Great Britain	146.85	180.0	185.0	-	185.0	147.5	~~152.5~~	~~152.5~~	147.5	180.0	~~185.0~~	-	180.0	512.5
11	Thamer Chaim	Brazil	114.10	175.0	~~182.5~~	~~182.5~~	175.0	135.0	~~142.5~~	~~142.5~~	135.0	180.0	~~190.0~~	-	180.0	490.0
-	Ken Patera	United States	145.80	212.5	~~227.5~~	~~230.0~~	212.5	~~165.0~~	~~165.0~~	~~170.0~~	NVL					DNF
-	Serge Reding	Belgium	139.45	~~222.5~~	~~222.5~~	~~225.0~~	NVL									DNF

Key: OR = Olympic record; DNF = did not finish; NVL = no valid lift
