= Joe Pittman =

Joe Pittman may refer to:

- Joe Pittman (baseball)
- Joe Pittman (politician)

== See also ==
- Joe Pitman, American weightlifter
