= Wayne Wilson =

Wayne Wilson may refer to:

- Wayne Wilson (American football) (1957–2024), American football running back
- Wayne Wilson (ice hockey) (born 1963), Canadian ice hockey coach
- Wayne Wilson (weightlifter) (born 1949), Canadian Olympic weightlifter
