= Weightlifting at the 1959 Pan American Games =

Weightlifting at the I959 Pan American Games
- Venue: Chicago Vocational School

Weightlifting at the 1959 Pan American Games refers to the weightlifting events of the 1959 Pan American Games. Well-known Japanese-American weightlifter Tommy Kono won his second-consecutive gold metal in his weight class after doing the same at the 1955 games.

== Men's competition ==
=== Bantamweight (– 56 kg) ===
| RANK | FINAL |
|---|---|
| Gold medal | Charles Vinci (USA) |
| Silver medal | Angel Famiglietti (PAN) |
| Bronze medal | Grantley Sobers (West Indies Federation) |

=== Featherweight (– 60 kg) ===
| RANK | FINAL |
|---|---|
| Gold medal | Isaac Berger (USA) |
| Silver medal | Maurice King (West Indies Federation) |
| Bronze medal | Mauro Alanis (MEX) |

=== Lightweight (– 67.5 kg) ===
| RANK | FINAL |
|---|---|
| Gold medal | Juan Torres (CUB) |
| Silver medal | Paul Goldberg (USA) |
| Bronze medal | Alberto Gumbs (PAN) |

=== Middleweight (– 75 kg) ===
| RANK | FINAL |
|---|---|
| Gold medal | Tommy Kono (USA) |
| Silver medal | Nazih Kerbage (ARG) |
| Bronze medal | Fred Marville (West Indies Federation) |

=== Light-heavyweight (– 82.5 kg) ===
| RANK | FINAL |
|---|---|
| Gold medal | James George (USA) |
| Silver medal | Enrique Guittens (VEN) |
| Bronze medal | Fernando Torres (PUR) |

=== Middle-heavyweight (– 90 kg) ===
| RANK | FINAL |
|---|---|
| Gold medal | Clyde Emrich (USA) |
| Silver medal | Philome LaGuerre (HAI) |
| Bronze medal | Adolph Williams (BGU) |

=== Heavyweight (+ 90 kg) ===
| RANK | FINAL |
|---|---|
| Gold medal | David Ashman (USA) |
| Silver medal | Humberto Selvetti (ARG) |
| Bronze medal | Eduardo Adriana (AHO) |

== Medal table ==
| Rank | Nation | Gold | Silver | Bronze | Total |
|---|---|---|---|---|---|
| 1 | United States | 6 | 1 | 0 | 7 |
| 2 | Cuba | 1 | 0 | 0 | 1 |
| 3 | Argentina | 0 | 2 | 0 | 2 |
| 4 | British West Indies | 0 | 1 | 2 | 3 |
| 5 | Panama | 0 | 1 | 1 | 2 |
| 6 | Haiti | 0 | 1 | 0 | 1 |
| 6 | Venezuela | 0 | 1 | 0 | 1 |
| 8 | Guyana | 0 | 0 | 1 | 1 |
| 8 | Mexico | 0 | 0 | 1 | 1 |
| 8 | Netherlands Antilles | 0 | 0 | 1 | 1 |
| 8 | Puerto Rico | 0 | 0 | 1 | 1 |
| Totals (11 entries) | | 7 | 7 | 7 | 21 |
