= Schake =

Schake is a surname. Notable people with the surname include:

- Cal Schake, American weightlifter
- Kori Schake (born 1962), American foreign policy advisor
