= Gorilla press =

Gorilla press may refer to:

- Gorilla press slam, a type of throw used in professional wrestling
- Military press, a weight training exercise utilizing a similar motion as the gorilla press slam
