= Weightlifting at the 1948 Summer Olympics =

Coordinates: 51.5556°N 0.2797°W

Weightlifting at the Games of the XIV Olympiad
- Venue: Empress Hall, Earl's Court
- Dates: 9–11 August 1948
- Competitors: 120 from 30 nations

The weightlifting competition at the 1948 Summer Olympics in London consisted of six weight classes, all for men only. The bantamweight division was a newly created weight class, marking the first change to the Olympic program since 1920.

== Medal summary ==
Games	Gold	Silver	Bronze
Bantamweight	Joseph De Pietro; United States	Julian Creus; Great Britain	Richard Tom; United States
Featherweight	Mahmoud Fayad; Egypt	Rodney Wilkes; Trinidad and Tobago	Jafar Salmasi; Iran
Lightweight	Ibrahim Shams; Egypt	Attia Hamouda; Egypt	James Halliday; Great Britain
Middleweight	Frank Spellman; United States	Pete George; United States	Kim Sung-Jip; South Korea
Light-heavyweight	Stanley Stanczyk; United States	Harold Sakata; United States	Gösta Magnusson; Sweden
Heavyweight	John Davis; United States	Norbert Schemansky; United States	Abraham Charite; Netherlands

== Medal table ==
Rank	Nation	Gold	Silver	Bronze	Total
1	United States	4	3	1	8
2	Egypt	2	1	0	3
3	Great Britain	0	1	1	2
4	Trinidad and Tobago	0	1	0	1
5	Iran	0	0	1	1
5	Netherlands	0	0	1	1
5	South Korea	0	0	1	1
5	Sweden	0	0	1	1
Totals (8 entries)		6	6	6	18

== Participating nations ==
- Argentina (8)
- Australia (2)
- Austria (6)
- Belgium (3)
- Burma (1)
- Canada (5)
- Cuba (3)
- Denmark (4)
- Egypt (8)
- Finland (4)
- France (9)
- Great Britain (10)
- Guyana (2)
- Hungary (3)
- India (2)
- Iran (5)
- Italy (1)
- Jamaica (2)
- South Korea (8)
- Mexico (3)
- Netherlands (2)
- New Zealand (1)
- Pakistan (2)
- Peru (3)
- Philippines (1)
- South Africa (2)
- Sweden (4)
- Switzerland (3)
- Trinidad and Tobago (1)
- United States (12)

== Sources ==
- "Olympic Medal Winners". International Olympic Committee.
