= Weightlifting at the 1952 Summer Olympics =

Weightlifting at the Games of the XV Olympiad
- Venue: Messuhalli
- Dates: 25–27 July 1952
- Competitors: 142 from 41 nations

The weightlifting competition at the 1952 Summer Olympics in Helsinki consisted of seven weight classes, all for men only. The middle-heavyweight division was a newly created weight class, moving the heavyweight class up from 82.5 kg to 90 kg. The events were held at Messuhalli.

== Medal summary ==
Games	Gold	Silver	Bronze
Bantamweight	Ivan Udodov; Soviet Union	Mahmoud Namjoo; Iran	Ali Mirzaei; Iran
Featherweight	Rafael Chimishkyan; Soviet Union	Nikolai Saksonov; Soviet Union	Rodney Wilkes; Trinidad and Tobago
Lightweight	Tommy Kono; United States	Yevgeni Lopatin; Soviet Union	Vern Barberis; Australia
Middleweight	Pete George; United States	Gérald Gratton; Canada	Kim Sung-Jip; South Korea
Light-heavyweight	Trofim Lomakin; Soviet Union	Stanley Stanczyk; United States	Arkady Vorobyev; Soviet Union
Middle-heavyweight	Norbert Schemansky; United States	Grigory Novak; Soviet Union	Lennox Kilgour; Trinidad and Tobago
Heavyweight	John Davis; United States	James Bradford; United States	Humberto Selvetti; Argentina

== Medal table ==
Rank	Nation	Gold	Silver	Bronze	Total
1	United States	4	2	0	6
2	Soviet Union	3	3	1	7
3	Iran	0	1	1	2
4	Canada	0	1	0	1
5	Trinidad and Tobago	0	0	2	2
6	Argentina	0	0	1	1
6	Australia	0	0	1	1
6	South Korea	0	0	1	1
Totals (8 entries)		7	7	7	21

== Participating nations ==
- Argentina (5)
- Australia (3)
- Austria (4)
- Belgium (2)
- Brazil (3)
- Burma (2)
- Canada (5)
- Cuba (1)
- Czechoslovakia (4)
- Denmark (3)
- Egypt (6)
- Finland (7)
- France (5)
- Germany (5)
- Great Britain (5)
- Guyana (1)
- Hungary (2)
- India (2)
- Indonesia (1)
- Iran (7)
- Italy (6)
- Japan (1)
- South Korea (4)
- Lebanon (1)
- Mexico (2)
- Netherlands (2)
- New Zealand (1)
- Norway (3)
- Pakistan (1)
- Panama (1)
- Philippines (2)
- Poland (4)
- Puerto Rico (3)
- Romania (4)
- Singapore (3)
- South Africa (4)
- Soviet Union (7)
- Sweden (7)
- Switzerland (4)
- Trinidad and Tobago (2)
- United States (7)

== Sources ==
- "Olympic Medal Winners". International Olympic Committee.
