= Athletics at the 1955 Pan American Games – Men's shot put =

Men's shot put at the Pan American Games

The men's shot put event at the 1955 Pan American Games was held at the Estadio Universitario in Mexico City on 14 March.

== Results ==
Rank	Name	Nationality	Result	Notes
1st place, gold medalist(s)	Parry O'Brien	United States	17.59	
2nd place, silver medalist(s)	Fortune Gordien	United States	15.98	
3rd place, bronze medalist(s)	Marty Engel	United States	14.62	
4	John Pavelich	Canada	14.24	
5	Eduardo Adriana	Netherlands Antilles	13.34	
6	Rafael Trompiz	Venezuela	12.79	
