= Ove Johansson (weightlifter) =

Swedish weightlifter

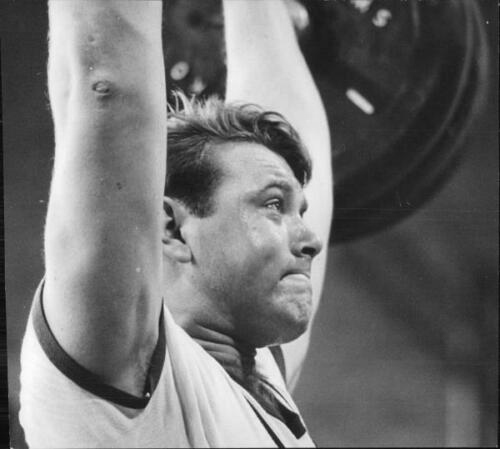
- Johansson in 1967

Personal information
- Nationality: Swedish
- Born: 24 December 1943; Stockholm, Sweden
- Died: 5 March 2025 (aged 81)
- Height: 184 cm (6 ft 0 in)
- Weight: 126 kg (278 lb)

Sport
- Sport: Weightlifting
- Club: Sundbybergs TK

Folke Klas-Ove Johansson (24 December 1943 – 5 March 2025) was a Swedish heavyweight weightlifter who competed at the 1968 and 1972 Summer Olympics. He failed in the clean and press in 1968, and finished ninth in 1972.
