= Joseph DePietro =

American weightlifter (1914–1999)

- Joseph DePietro and Bob Kurland on the way to the 1948 Olympics

Personal information
- Born: June 10, 1914 Paterson, New Jersey, U.S.
- Died: March 19, 1999 (aged 84) Fair Lawn, New Jersey, U.S.
- Height: 1.40 m (4 ft 7 in)
- Weight: 56 kg (123 lb)

Sport
- Sport: Weightlifting
- Club: Bates Weightlifting Club
Medal record
Representing the United States
Olympic Games
Gold medal – first place	1948 London	-56 kg
World Championships
Gold medal – first place	1947 Philadelphia	-56 kg
Bronze medal – third place	1949 Scheveningen	-56 kg
Pan American Games
Gold medal – first place	1951 Buenos Aires	-56 kg

Joseph Nicholas DePietro (June 10, 1914 – March 19, 1999) was an American bantamweight (56 kg) weightlifter. He won gold medals at the 1947 World Championships, 1948 Summer Olympics and 1951 Pan American Games. During his career DePietro set two world records, in 1947 and 1948, both in the press. DePietro had very short arms and body, so that the bar was barely clearing his head when he was lifting it.
