= Charles Vinci =

American weightlifter (1933–2018)

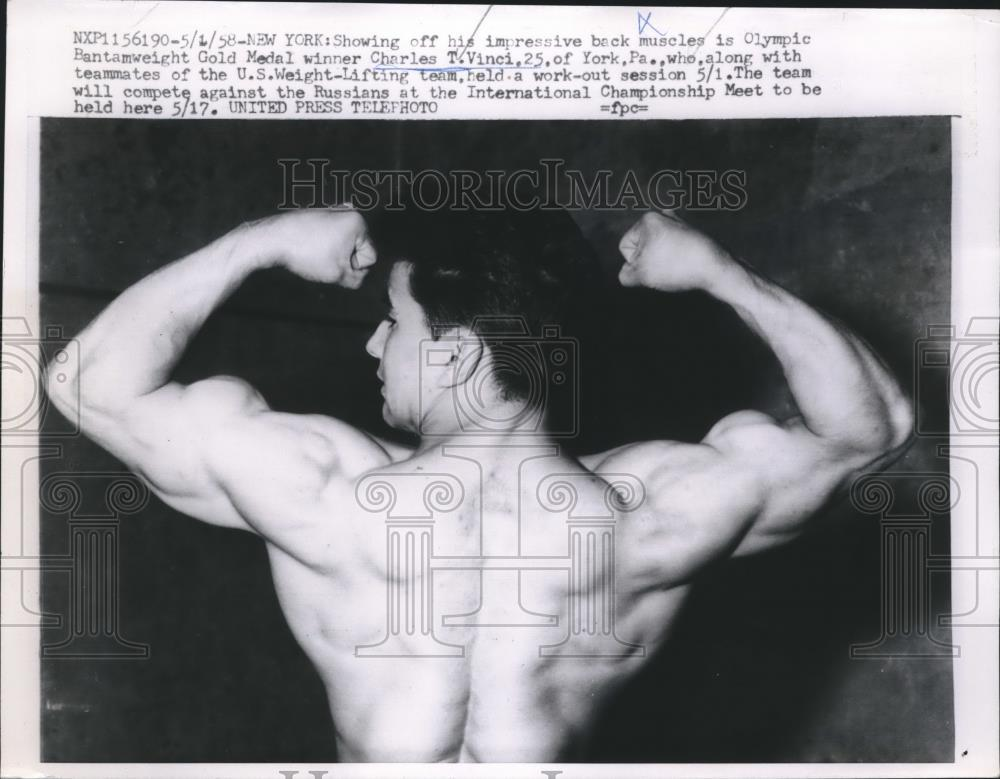
- Charles Vinci

Personal information
- Nickname: Mighty Mite
- Born: February 28, 1933 Cleveland, Ohio, U.S.
- Died: June 13, 2018 (aged 85) Elyria, Ohio, U.S.
- Height: 4 ft 11 1/2 in (151 cm)
- Weight: 123 lb (56 kg)
Medal record
Men's weightlifting
Representing the United States
Olympic Games
Gold medal – first place	1956 Melbourne	Bantamweight
Gold medal – first place	1960 Rome	Bantamweight
World Championships
Silver medal – second place	1955 Munich	Bantamweight
Silver medal – second place	1958 Stockholm	Bantamweight
Pan American Games
Gold medal – first place	1955 Mexico City	Bantamweight
Gold medal – first place	1959 Chicago	Bantamweight

Charles Thomas Vinci Jr. (February 28, 1933 – June 13, 2018) was an American weightlifter and Olympic champion. Born in Cleveland, Ohio, Vinci was the United States Senior National Champion from 1954 to 1956 and from 1958 to 1961. He received silver medals in the 1955 and 1958 world championships. He won gold medals at the 1955 and 1959 Pan American games. He won a gold medal at the 1956 Summer Olympics in Melbourne, with a world-record three-lift (snatch, clean and jerk, overhead press) total of 342.5 kilograms (755.1 lb). Just prior to weighing-in, Vinci was 1.5 pounds overweight. After an hour of running and sweating, he was still seven ounces over the limit, but a severe last-minute haircut saw him make the weight limit. He won gold again at the 1960 Summer Olympics in Rome.

During his career, Vinci set 12 world records in the bantamweight class, between 1955 and 1960. He held records in snatch, in clean and jerk and in press, as well as in total (3).

He died in Elyria, Ohio at the age of 85.
