= Roberto Lindeborg =

Dutch Antillean weightlifter (1942–2016)

Personal information
- Nationality: Dutch Antillean
- Born: 9 May 1942
- Died: 7 December 2016 (aged 74)

Sport
- Sport: Weightlifting
Medal record
Men's weightlifting
Representing Netherlands Antilles
Pan American Games
Gold medal – first place	1971 Colombia	Press – 52 kg
Bronze medal – third place	1971 Colombia	Clean and Jerk – 52 kg
Silver medal – second place	1971 Colombia	Total – 52 kg

Roberto Lindeborg (9 May 1942 – 7 December 2016) was a Dutch Antillean weightlifter. He competed in the men's bantamweight event at the 1972 Summer Olympics.
