= Brett Brian =

American weightlifter (born 1962)

Personal information
- Born: September 22, 1962 (age 63) Baton Rouge, Louisiana, United States

Sport
- Sport: Weightlifting

Brett Brian (born September 22, 1962) is an American former weightlifter. He competed at the 1988 Summer Olympics and the 1992 Summer Olympics.
