= Martin Dias =

Guyanese weightlifter (born 1936)

Personal information
- Nickname: The Mighty Midget
- Nationality: Guyanese
- Born: 17 October 1936 (age 89) Mahaica, Demerara-Mahaica, British Guiana

Sport
- Sport: Weightlifting
- Weight class: –56 kg
Medal record
Men's weightlifting
Representing British Guiana/Guyana
Pan American Games
Gold medal – first place	1963 São Paulo	–56 kg
Bronze medal – third place	1967 Winnipeg	–56 kg
British Empire and Commonwealth Games
Bronze medal – third place	1962 Perth	Bantamweight
Silver medal – second place	1966 Kingston	Bantamweight
Central American and Caribbean Games
Silver medal – second place	1962 Kingston	–56 kg
Silver medal – second place	1966 San Juan	–56 kg

Martin Dias (born 17 October 1936) is a Guyanese weightlifter. He competed in the men's bantamweight event at the 1964 Summer Olympics.
