= Hector Curiel =

Dutch Antillean weightlifter (born 1936)

Personal information
- Full name: Hector Publio Curiel
- Nationality: Dutch Antillean
- Born: 2 November 1936 Curaçao
- Died: 26 January 2022 (aged 85)
- Height: 167 cm (5 ft 6 in)
- Weight: 55–56 kg (121–123 lb)

Sport
- Sport: Weightlifting
- Weight class: Bantamweight –56 kg; Featherweight –60 kg
Medal record
Men's weightlifting
Representing Netherlands Antilles
Pan American Games
Silver medal – second place	1963 São Paulo	Bantamweight –56 kg
Central American and Caribbean Games
Silver medal – second place	1959 Caracas	Bantamweight –56 kg
Bronze medal – third place	1962 Kingston	Bantamweight –56 kg
Bronze medal – third place	1970 Panamá	Featherweight –60 kg

Hector Publio Curiel (2 November 1936 – 26 January 2022) was a Dutch Antillean weightlifter. He competed at the 1960 Summer Olympics and the 1964 Summer Olympics.
