= Dan Cantore =

American weightlifter (born 1946)

Dan Cantore (born August 24, 1946) is a weightlifter for the United States. Cantore competed at 148 lbs standing at 5 foot 4 inches tall. He was born on August 24, 1946, in Glendale, California. Cantore works out at Alex gym. He competed at the 1972 Summer Olympics and the 1976 Summer Olympics.

Cantore obtained his degree from the University of California, Berkeley.

== Weightlifting achievements ==
- Five time U.S. National Champion 1972, 1973, 1974, 1975, 1976
- Broke American record press twice in 1972, with 303 lbs at the Nationals and 308 lbs at Munich
- Broke American record clean and jerk twice in 1972, with 355 lbs and then 358 lbs at the Nationals to break Tony Garcy's record from 1964.
- Broke American record ( snatch) in 1974, with 281lbs at US Senior Nationals, old record was held by Tony Garcy, from 1964.
- Two time Pan American Champion, and Pan Am record holders, 1973, and 1974.
- U.S. Weightlifter of the year, 1974.
- Member US Weightlifting Hall of Fame.
