= Miosotis Heredia =

Dominican Republic weightlifter

Personal information
- Born: 1972 (age 53–54)
Medal record
Women's Weightlifting
Representing the Dominican Republic
Pan American Games
Silver medal – second place	1999 Winnipeg	– 69 kg
Bronze medal – third place	2003 Santo Domingo	– 69 kg

Miosotis Heredia (born 1972-01-12) is a female weightlifter from the Dominican Republic. She won two medals during her career at the Pan American Games (1999 and 2003) in the women's light-heavyweight division (– 69 kg).
