= Julio Loscos =

Cuban weightlifter (born 1961)

Personal information
- Nationality: Cuban
- Born: 14 April 1961 (age 64)

Sport
- Sport: Weightlifting

Julio Loscos (born 14 April 1961) is a Cuban weightlifter. He competed in the men's featherweight event at the 1980 Summer Olympics.
