= Bèto Adriana =

Dutch Antillean sportsperson

Personal information
- Born: Eduardo Adriana; 29 July 1925 Otrobanda, Curaçao
- Died: 10 April 1997 (aged 71)
- Height: 1.76 m (5 ft 9 in)
- Weight: 120 kg (265 lb)

Sport
- Sport: Sports shooting, weightlifting, athletics
- Event: Shot put
Medal record
Men's weightlifting heavyweight
Representing Netherlands Antilles
Pan American Games
Bronze medal – third place	1955 Mexico City
Bronze medal – third place	1959 Chicago
Bronze medal – third place	1963 São Paulo

Eduardo “Bèto” Adriana (29 July 1925 – 10 April 1997) was a sportsman who represented the Netherlands Antilles at the Olympics. At the 1960 Summer Olympics he competed in the weightlifting competition and at the 1972 Summer Olympics he competed in the sports shooting.

In weightlifting, he won three bronze medals at the Pan American Games from 1955 to 1963. He also finished fifth in the shot put competition at the 1955 Pan American Games.

== International competitions (athletics) ==
Year	Competition	Venue	Position	Event	Notes
Representing Netherlands Antilles
1946	Central American and Caribbean Games	Barranquilla, Colombia	1st	Shot put	13.35 m
1950	Central American and Caribbean Games	Guatemala City, Guatemala	2nd	Shot put	13.67 m
1954	Central American and Caribbean Games	Mexico City, Mexico	2nd	Shot put	14.45 m
1955	Pan American Games	Mexico City, Mexico	5th	Shot put	13.34 m
1959	Central American and Caribbean Games	Caracas, Venezuela	1st	Shot put	14.59 m
