= Pierre St.-Jean =

Canadian weightlifter (born 1943)

Pierre St-Jean (alternate listings: Pierre St-Jean, Pierre Saint-Jean, Pierre St.Jean; born March 28, 1943, in Montreal, Quebec) is a Canadian weightlifter who competed from the mid-1960s to the mid-1970s. He competed for Canada at the 1964, 1968 and 1976 Summer Olympics, with a best finish of 10th in 1968.

St-Jean also competed in the British Empire and Commonwealth Games, winning a silver medal in 1962, a gold medal in 1966 and a bronze medal in 1970. He won bronze medals at the Pan American Games in 1963 and 1967.

At the 1976 Summer Olympics in Montreal, he took the Athlete's Oath.

He now resides in Orleans, Ontario.
