= Richard Tom =

American weightlifter

- Tom in 1947

Personal information
- Born: November 8, 1920 Canton, Guangdong, Republic of China
- Died: February 20, 2007 (aged 86) Aina Haina, Hawaii, U.S.

Sport
- Sport: Weightlifting
- Club: Nuuanu Young Men's Christian Association
Medal record
Representing United States
Olympic Games
Bronze medal – third place	1948 London	-56 kg
World Championships
Silver medal – second place	1947 Philadelphia	-56 kg

Richard Wah Sung Tom (November 8, 1920 – February 20, 2007) was a Chinese American bantamweight weightlifter. He won a silver medal at the 1947 World Championships and a bronze at the 1948 Olympics. In 1952 he won his only national AAU title and later served as a weightlifting official. Tom was a World War II veteran. He was born in China, but his family moved to Hawaii when he was a boy. He was the first Chinese-American to compete for the United States at the Olympics.
