= Alberto Blanco (weightlifter) =

Cuban weightlifter (born 1950)

Personal information
- Full name: Alberto Blanco Fernández
- Born: 17 February 1950 (age 76)
- Height: 173 cm (5 ft 8 in)
- Weight: 90–100 kg (198–220 lb)

Sport
- Country: Cuba
- Sport: Weightlifting
- Weight class: 90 kg
- Team: National team
Medal record
Men's weightlifting
Representing Cuba
Olympic Games
| Bronze medal – third place | 1980 Moscow | 100 kg |
World Championships
| Bronze medal – third place | 1977 Stuttgart | 90 kg |
| Bronze medal – third place | 1979 Thessaloniki | 100 kg |
| Bronze medal – third place | 1980 Moscow | 100 kg |
Pan American Games
| Silver medal – second place | 1975 Mexico City | 90 kg |
| Gold medal – first place | 1979 San Juan | 100 kg |
- Updated on 7 October 2016

Alberto Blanco Fernández (born 17 February 1950) is a Cuban weightlifter. He competed in the middle heavyweight and First heavyweight class, representing Cuba at international competitions. He won the bronze medal at the 1977, 1979 and 1980 World Weightlifting Championships. He won the bronze medal at the 1980 Summer Olympics in the 100 kg event. He also participated at the 1976 Summer Olympics. He won the gold medal at the 1979 Pan American Games in the Sub-Heavyweight class (357.5 kg).
