= Humberto Selvetti =

Argentine weightlifter (1932–1992)

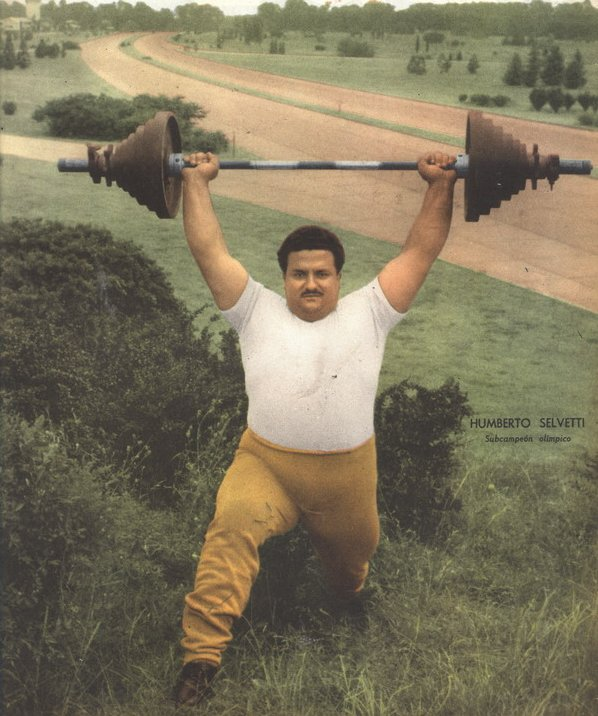
- Selvetti in 1957

Personal information
- Born: 31 March 1932 Colón, Argentina
- Died: 26 April 1992 (aged 60) Wilde, Argentina
- Height: 180 cm (5 ft 11 in)
- Weight: 140 kg (309 lb)

Sport
- Sport: Weightlifting
Medal record
Men's weightlifting
Representing Argentina
Olympic Games
| Bronze medal – third place | 1952 Helsinki | Heavyweight |
| Silver medal – second place | 1956 Melbourne | Heavyweight |
World Championships
| Bronze medal – third place | 1953 Stockholm | Heavyweight |
| Silver medal – second place | 1957 Tehran | Heavyweight |
Pan American Games
| Silver medal – second place | 1955 Mexico City | Super heavyweight |
| Silver medal – second place | 1959 Chicago | Super heavyweight |

Humberto Selvetti (31 March 1932 – 26 April 1992) was an Argentine heavyweight weightlifter. He competed at the 1952, 1956 and 1964 Summer Olympics and finished in third, second and 17th place, respectively. He also won four medals at world championships and Pan American Games and set a world record in the press, in 1951.
