= Rogelio Weatherbee =

Mexican weightlifter (born 1955)

Personal information
- Nationality: Mexican
- Born: 8 July 1955 (age 69)

Sport
- Sport: Weightlifting

Rogelio Weatherbee (born 8 July 1955) is a Mexican weightlifter. He competed in the men's middleweight event at the 1980 Summer Olympics.

== Major results ==
Year	Venue	Weight	Snatch (kg)					Clean & Jerk (kg)					Total	Rank
Year	Venue	Weight	1	2	3	Results	Rank	1	2	3	Results	Rank	Total	Rank
Representing Mexico
Olympic Games
1980	Moscow, Soviet Union	75 kg	130.0	~~135.0~~	135.0	135.0	9	160.0	165.0	~~170.0~~	165.0	10	300.0	9
Pan American Games
1979	San Juan, Puerto Rico	75 kg	—	—	—	—	3rd place, bronze medalist(s)	—	—	—	—	3rd place, bronze medalist(s)	275.0	3rd place, bronze medalist(s)
Central American and Caribbean Games
1978	Medellín, Colombia	75 kg	—	—	—	125.0	2nd place, silver medalist(s)	—	—	—	150.0	2nd place, silver medalist(s)	275.0	2nd place, silver medalist(s)
