= Ernesto Varona =

Cuban weightlifter (born 1940)

Personal information
- Nationality: Cuban
- Born: 7 November 1940 (age 84)

Sport
- Sport: Weightlifting

Ernesto Varona (born 7 November 1940) is a Cuban weightlifter. He competed in the men's heavyweight event at the 1964 Summer Olympics.
