= Robert Santavy =

Canadian weightlifter (born 1947)

Personal information
- Born: 27 October 1947 (age 79) Saint Boniface, Manitoba, Canada

Sport
- Sport: Weightlifting

Robert Cyril Santavy (born 27 October 1947) is a Canadian weightlifter. He competed in the men's heavyweight event at the 1976 Summer Olympics.
