= Andrés Martínez (weightlifter) =

Cuban weightlifter (born 1944)

Personal information
- Born: 10 June 1944 (age 81); Pinar del Río, Cuba

Sport
- Sport: Weightlifting

Andrés Martínez (born 10 June 1944) is a Cuban weightlifter. He competed at the 1968 Summer Olympics and the 1972 Summer Olympics.
