= Pablo Justiniani =

Panamanian weightlifter (born 1952)

Personal information
- Nationality: Panamanian
- Born: 9 March 1952 (age 73)

Sport
- Sport: Weightlifting

Pablo Justiniani (born 9 March 1952) is a Panamanian weightlifter. He competed in the men's light heavyweight event at the 1976 Summer Olympics.
