= Orlando Garrido (weightlifter) =

Cuban weightlifter (1924–2015)

Orlando Remberto Garrido Luloaga (4 February 1924 – 24 June 2015) was a Cuban weightlifter who competed in the 1948 Summer Olympics and in the 1952 Summer Olympics.
