= Hugo D'Atri =

Argentine weightlifter (1925–2009)

Personal information
- Full name: Hugo Contardo Emilio D'Atri
- Nationality: Argentine
- Born: 31 July 1925
- Died: 21 August 2009 (aged 84)

Sport
- Sport: Weightlifting

Hugo Contardo Emilio D'Atri (31 July 1925 – 21 August 2009) was an Argentine weightlifter. He competed in the men's lightweight event at the 1948 Summer Olympics.
