= Roberto Urrutia =

American-Cuban weightlifter (born 1957)

Personal information
- Full name: Roberto Antonio Urrutia Herdez
- Nickname: Tony
- Born: December 7, 1957 Cuba
- Died: December 2, 2024 (aged 66) United States
- Height: 1.68 m (5 ft 6 in)
Medal record
Men's weightlifting
Representing Cuba
World Championships
Gold medal – first place	1977 Stuttgart	67.5 kg
Gold medal – first place	1978 Gettysburg	75 kg
Gold medal – first place	1979 Thessaloniki	75 kg
Pan American Games
Gold medal – first place	1975 Mexico City	67.5 kg
Gold medal – first place	1979 San Juan	75 kg
Central American and Caribbean Games
Gold medal – first place	1978 Medellín	75 kg
Representing United States
Pan American Games
Bronze medal – third place	1987 Indianapolis	75 kg

Roberto Antonio Urrutia Herdez (Note: In this Spanish name, the first or paternal surname is Urrutia and the second or maternal family name is Herdez.) (December 7, 1957 – December 2, 2024), known as Tony Urrutia, was a Cuban-American Olympic weightlifter. In 1980, he defected from Cuba to, and competed for, the United States.

== Weightlifting achievements ==
- Senior world champion (1977–1979).
- Olympic team member (Cuban Team 1976; U.S.A. Team 1988 and 1992).
- Pan Am Games champion (1975 and 1979).
- Bronze medalist in Pan Am Games (1987).
- Senior national champion (1987–1989, 1991, and 1992).
- Set six world records during career.
- All-time senior American record holder in clean and jerk and total.
