= Ángel Sposato =

Argentine weightlifter (1922–c. 1990s)

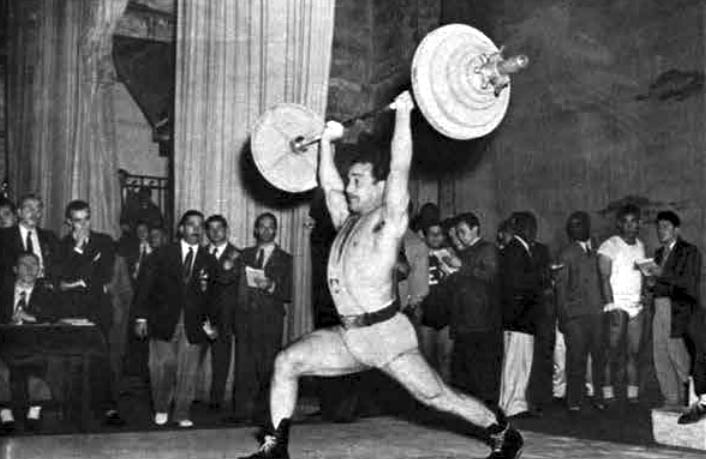
- Sposato at the 1951 Pan American Games

Personal information
- Full name: Ángel Edmundo Sposato
- Nationality: Argentine
- Born: 17 May 1922 Godoy Cruz, Mendoza, Argentina
- Died: c. early 1990s

Sport
- Sport: Weightlifting

Ángel Edmundo Sposato (17 May 1922 – c. early 1990s) was an Argentine weightlifter. He competed in the men's middleweight event at the 1952 Summer Olympics. Sposato died around the early 1990s.
