= Stanley Stanczyk =

American weightlifter (1925–1997)

Personal information
- Born: May 10, 1925 Armstrong, Wisconsin, United States
- Died: July 3, 1997 (aged 72) Miami, Florida, United States

Sport
- Sport: Weightlifting
- Club: York Barbell Club
Medal record
Representing the United States
Olympic Games
Gold medal – first place	1948 London	-82.5 kg
Silver medal – second place	1952 Helsinki	-82.5 kg
World Weightlifting Championships
Gold medal – first place	1946 Paris	Lightweight
Gold medal – first place	1947 Philadelphia	Middleweight
Gold medal – first place	1949 Scheveningen	Light heavyweight
Gold medal – first place	1950 Paris	Light heavyweight
Gold medal – first place	1951 Milan	Light heavyweight
Bronze medal – third place	1953 Stockholm	Light heavyweight
Bronze medal – third place	1954 Vienna	Middleweight
Pan American Games
Gold medal – first place	1951 Buenos Aires	Light heavyweight

Stanley Anthony "Stan" Stanczyk (May 10, 1925 – July 3, 1997) was an American weightlifter. Between 1946 and 1952 he won five consecutive world titles in three different weight classes, six consecutive national titles, as well as gold medals at the 1948 Summer Olympics and 1951 Pan American Games. In 1946–1949 he set seven ratified world records: four in the snatch, one in the clean and jerk and two in the total. Stanczyk finished second at the 1952 Summer Olympics and third at the 1953 and 1954 world championships.

During World War II Stanczyk served in the U.S. Army for three years. He retired in 1954 and opened a bowling alley in Miami combined with a restaurant, which he ran for 27 years together with his wife Dorothy. During those years he competed in bowling, continued to lift weights, and trained other weightlifters. In 1991 he was inducted into the National Polish American Sports Hall of Fame.
