= Pedro Serrano (weightlifter) =

Puerto Rican weightlifter (1931–2017)

Personal information
- Nationality: Puerto Rican
- Born: 9 November 1931 Aguas Buenas, Puerto Rico
- Died: 10 November 2017 (aged 86)

Sport
- Sport: Weightlifting

Pedro Serrano (9 November 1931 – 10 November 2017) was a Puerto Rican weightlifter. He competed at the 1964 Summer Olympics and the 1968 Summer Olympics.
