= Isaac Berger =

American weightlifter (1936–2022)

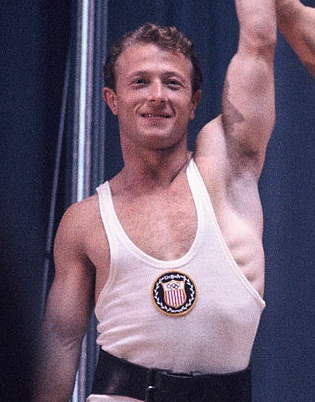
- Berger at the 1964 Olympics

Personal information
- Native name: יצחק ברגר
- Born: November 16, 1936 Jerusalem, Mandatory Palestine
- Died: June 4, 2022 (aged 85)
- Height: 157 cm (5 ft 2 in)
- Weight: 59–60 kg (130–132 lb)

Sport
- Sport: Weightlifting
- Club: York Barbell Club
Medal record
Men's weightlifting
Representing the United States
Olympic Games
| Gold medal – first place | 1956 Melbourne | -60 kg |
| Silver medal – second place | 1960 Rome | -60 kg |
| Silver medal – second place | 1964 Tokyo | -60 kg |
World Championships
| Bronze medal – third place | 1957 Teheran | -60 kg |
| Gold medal – first place | 1958 Stockholm | -60 kg |
| Silver medal – second place | 1959 Warsaw | -60 kg |
| Gold medal – first place | 1961 Vienna | -60 kg |
| Silver medal – second place | 1963 Stockholm | -60 kg |
| Silver medal – second place | 1964 Tokyo | -60 kg |
Pan American Games
| Gold medal – first place | 1959 Chicago | -60 kg |
| Gold medal – first place | 1963 São Paulo | -60 kg |

Isaac "Ike" Berger (Hebrew: יצחק ברגר; November 16, 1936 – June 4, 2022) was an American weightlifter, in the featherweight division, who competed for the United States at the 1956, 1960 and 1964 Olympics and won one gold and two silver medals. He held eight world records (four official and four unofficial), and won the United States national title eight times. In the highest level international competition, he was world featherweight (60 kg) champion in 1958 and 1961, and was the runner-up for that title in 1957, 1959, and 1963.

Berger was born to a rabbi in Jerusalem, where he studied in a yeshiva. In addition to working as a rabbi, his father made a living as a diamond setter. Isaac and his family immigrated to New York in 1949 when he was thirteen, and he became a naturalized American citizen in December 1955. Around 1952, Berger started lifting weights at Schaffer's Gym in Brooklyn. He studied auto mechanics for three years at East New York Vocational School, and later studied voice and trained to be a cantor in a synagogue. As a young man, Isaac spent time in playgrounds, doing acrobatics, playing softball, basketball, and even boxing at the Hebrew Educational Alliance in New York.

Berger was the first featherweight in history to lift more than 800 pounds (360 kg), and the first to press double his body weight. He twice won the world championships and the Pan American Games.

In 1955, at nineteen, he won the senior United States weightlifting title, which he won again in 1956 and 1957.

In his gold medal performance at the 1957 Maccabiah Games, Berger was the first (and until 1998 the only) athlete to set a world record on Israeli land in any sport. He pressed 117 kilograms (258 lb). His gold medal was presented to him by Israel Prime Minister David Ben-Gurion, who called him the "Gibor Yehudi" or "Mighty Jew".

== Olympics ==
Berger's IWF featherweight division standard of 60 kg (132 pounds) remained in use until 1993. His most publicized early achievement was likely his Gold medal in the 60 kg weightlifting competition at the 1956 Melbourne Summer Olympics, setting a world record of 352.5 kilograms (776 lbs) for three lifts. Four days before competing for the featherweight (60 kg) title at the 1960 Rome Summer Olympics, he broke four world records in the press (264 pounds), the snatch (253 pounds), the clean and jerk (336 pounds), and the total (853 pounds). Ike believed the strain and injury caused by this effort was the reason he won only a Silver Medal behind Eugene Miniev of the Soviet Union in Olympic competition. Berger became known as one of the few athletes who could compete against the Soviet dominance in weightlifting in his featherweight (60 kg) weight class. Later in his career, demonstrating his consistency in high level international competition, he won a silver medal at the 1964 Tokyo Summer Olympics at 60 kg.

== World championships ==
Showing consistent achievement in the World Championships in his 60 kg weight class, Isaac medaled every year from 1957 to 1964, with the exception of the year 1962, taking a bronze in 1957, a gold in 1958, a silver in 1959, a gold in 1961, a silver in 1963, and a final silver in 1964.

In the Pan Am Games in his 60 kg division, Berger took a gold in 1959 Pan Am Games in São Paulo, Brazil, and another gold at the 1963 Pan Am Games in Chicago.

== Retirement ==
In 1964, after retiring from weightlifting not long after the 1964 Olympics, he started a mail-order business in New York selling an exerciser that could be used for weight loss. In 1965, he helped create a product called Waste-a-Way, a belt for losing weight, that was successfully marketed. In 1965, he began a three-year training period at the New York College of Music to become a cantor, eventually officiating at synagogues in Florida, Missouri, and New York. In 1970, Isaac concentrated his attention on a business venture, known as Ike Berger Enterprises, devoted largely to the sale of weightlifting and exercise products.

== Honors ==
Berger was named to the United States Weightlifters Hall of Fame in 1965, and the International Jewish Sports Hall of Fame in 1980. He died on June 4, 2022.

== See also ==
- List of select Jewish weightlifters
