= Narcisco Orán =

Panamanian weightlifter (born 1953)

Personal information
- Nationality: Panamanian
- Born: 17 May 1953 (age 72)

Sport
- Sport: Weightlifting

Narcisco Orán (born 17 May 1953) is a Panamanian weightlifter. He competed in the men's flyweight event at the 1976 Summer Olympics.
