= Juan Curbelo (weightlifter) =

Cuban weightlifter (1946–2020)

Personal information
- Born: 27 January 1946; Cienfuegos, Cuba
- Died: 21 May 2020 (aged 74)

Sport
- Sport: Weightlifting

Juan Curbelo (27 January 1946 – 21 May 2020) was a Cuban weightlifter. He competed at the 1968 Summer Olympics and the 1972 Summer Olympics.
