= Joe Pitman =

American weightlifter (1924–2018)

Joseph Precott Pitman (August 21, 1924 – June 1, 2018) was an American weightlifter who competed in the 1948 Summer Olympics. He was born in Laconia, New Hampshire. Pitman is on the wall of fame at the United States Olympic Training Center.

== See also ==
- Weightlifting at the 1951 Pan American Games
- Weightlifting at the 1955 Pan American Games
