= Rudy Monk =

Dutch Antillean weightlifter (1936–2013)

Personal information
- Nationality: Dutch Antillean
- Born: 26 January 1936; Curaçao
- Died: August 2013 (aged 77)

Sport
- Sport: Weightlifting

Rudolf Ernst "Rudy" Monk Sofia (26 January 1936 – August 2013) was a Dutch Antillean weightlifter. He competed at the 1960 Summer Olympics, the 1964 Summer Olympics and the 1968 Summer Olympics. He retired in 1976 and continued coaching until 1983.
