= Juan Benavides (weightlifter) =

Cuban weightlifter (born 1942)

Personal information
- Born: 5 February 1942 (age 83); Guantánamo, Cuba

Sport
- Sport: Weightlifting

Juan Benavides (born 5 February 1942) is a Cuban weightlifter. He competed in the men's middle heavyweight event at the 1968 Summer Olympics.
