= Andrés Santoyo =

Mexican weightlifter (born 1952)

Personal information
- Nationality: Mexican
- Born: 6 January 1952 (age 73)

Sport
- Sport: Weightlifting

Andrés Santoyo (born 6 January 1952) is a Mexican weightlifter. He competed at the 1976 Summer Olympics and the 1980 Summer Olympics.
