= Norbert Schemansky =

American weightlifter (1924–2016)

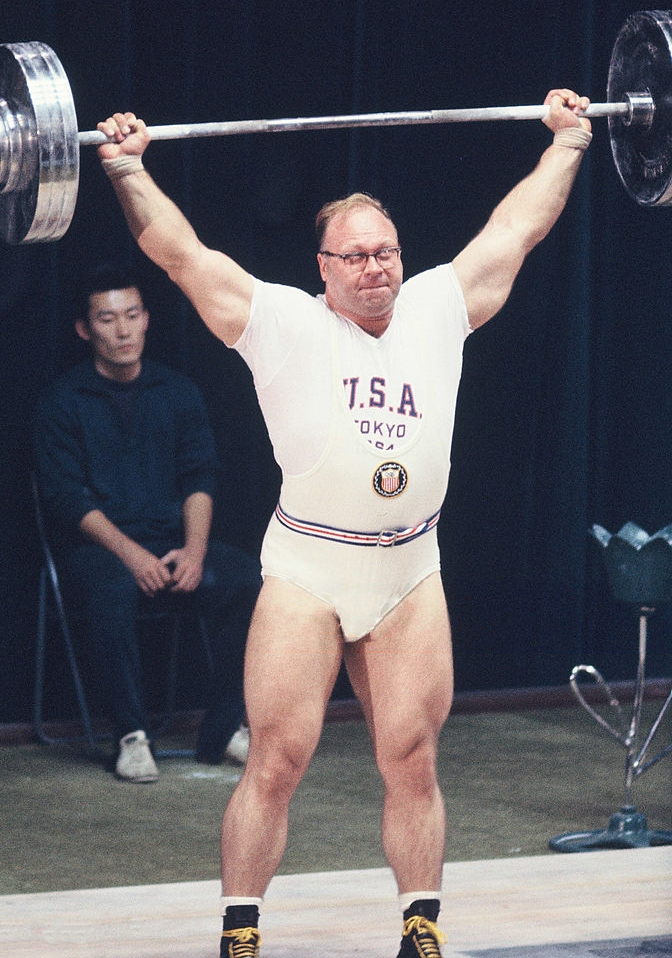
- Schemansky at the 1964 Olympics

Personal information
- Nickname: Norb
- Born: May 30, 1924 Detroit, Michigan, U.S.
- Died: September 7, 2016 (aged 92) Dearborn, Michigan, U.S.
- Height: 181 cm (5 ft 11 in)
- Weight: 90–121 kg (198–267 lb)

Sport
- Sport: Olympic weightlifting
- Events: Clean and press; Snatch; Clean and jerk
- Club: York Barbell Club
- Turned pro: 1947
- Retired: 1972
Medal record
Representing the United States
Olympic Games
Gold medal – first place	1952 Helsinki	90 kg
Silver medal – second place	1948 London	+90 kg
Bronze medal – third place	1960 Rome	+90 kg
Bronze medal – third place	1964 Tokyo	+90 kg
World Championships
Silver medal – second place	1947 Philadelphia	+82.5kg
Gold medal – first place	1951 Milan	90kg
Gold medal – first place	1953 Stockholm	90kg
Gold medal – first place	1954 Vienna	+90kg
Silver medal – second place	1962 Budapest	+90kg
Silver medal – second place	1963 Stockholm	+90kg
Pan American Games
Gold medal – first place	1955 Mexico City	+90kg

Norbert Schemansky (May 30, 1924 – September 7, 2016) was an American weightlifter. He was the first weightlifter to win four Olympic medals, despite missing the 1956 Summer Olympics due to back problems. He won a silver medal in the 1948 Summer Olympic Games, a gold in the 1952 Summer Olympics and bronzes in the 1960 and 1964 Summer Olympics.

== Biography ==
Schemansky was a three-time world champion and a Pan American and Olympic games gold medalist. During his long weightlifting career (1947–1972) he set 13 official and 11 unofficial world records. On April 28, 1962, at the age of 37 years and 333 days, Schemansky became the oldest man in the history of weightlifting to set an official world record, when he snatched 164 kg. In 1997 Schemansky was inducted into the International Weightlifting Federation Hall of fame. In 1979, he was inducted into the National Polish-American Sports Hall of Fame. He was born and raised in Detroit and from 1959 until his death in 2016 lived in Dearborn, Michigan, where a city park was named for him. Prior to his years of Olympic weightlifting competition, Schemansky served in World War II with the 184th Anti-Aircraft Artillery Battalion and fought at the Battle of the Bulge. Schemansky died in Dearborn on September 7, 2016, at the age of 92, while in hospice care.
