= William March (weightlifter) =

American weightlifter (1937–2022)

Personal information
- Born: February 4, 1937 York, Pennsylvania, United States
- Died: October 9, 2022 (aged 85) Wellsville, Pennsylvania, United States

Sport
- Sport: Weightlifting

William March (February 4, 1937 – October 9, 2022) was an American weightlifter. He competed in the men's middle heavyweight event at the 1964 Summer Olympics.
