= José Martínez (weightlifter) =

Colombian weightlifter (born 1950)

Personal information
- Nationality: Colombian
- Born: 11 February 1950 (age 75)

Sport
- Sport: Weightlifting

José Martínez (born 11 February 1950) is a Colombian weightlifter. He competed in the men's lightweight event at the 1972 Summer Olympics.
