= Carlos Seigelshifer =

Argentine weightlifter (1928–2021)

Personal information
- Nationality: Argentine
- Born: 3 September 1928
- Died: 18 July 2021 (aged 92)

Sport
- Sport: Weightlifting

Carlos Seigelshifer (3 September 1928 – 18 July 2021) was an Argentine weightlifter. He competed in the men's middle heavyweight event at the 1956 Summer Olympics.
