= Thamer Chaim =

Brazilian weightlifter (born 1945)

Personal information
- Born: 1 June 1945 (age 80); São Paulo, Brazil

Sport
- Sport: Weightlifting

Thamer Chaim (born 1 June 1945) is a Brazilian weightlifter. He competed in the men's super heavyweight event at the 1972 Summer Olympics.
