= Jesús Conde =

Mexican weightlifter (born 1949)

Personal information
- Nationality: Mexican
- Born: 4 July 1949 (age 75)

Sport
- Sport: Weightlifting

Jesús Conde (born 4 July 1949) is a Mexican weightlifter. He competed in the men's bantamweight event at the 1972 Summer Olympics.
