= Mike Lipari =

Canadian weightlifter (1932–2012)

Personal information
- Born: 18 December 1932 Montreal, Quebec, Canada
- Died: 20 April 2012 (aged 79–80) Montreal, Quebec, Canada

Sport
- Sport: Weightlifting

Mike Lipari (18 December 1932 – 20 April 2012) was a Canadian weightlifter. He competed in the men's light heavyweight event at the 1960 Summer Olympics.
