= Norberto Ferreira =

Argentine weightlifter (1919–1952)

Personal information
- Nationality: Argentine
- Born: 5 April 1919
- Died: 28 November 1952 (aged 33); Buenos Aires, Argentina

Sport
- Sport: Weightlifting

Norberto Ferreira (5 April 1919 – 28 November 1952) was an Argentine weightlifter. He competed in the men's heavyweight event at the 1952 Summer Olympics.
