= Gerardo Fernández (weightlifter) =

Cuban weightlifter (born 1953)

Personal information
- Nationality: Cuban
- Born: 24 September 1953
- Died: 4 January 2025 (aged 71)

Sport
- Sport: Weightlifting

Gerardo Fernández (24 September 1953 – 4 January 2025) was a Cuban weightlifter. He competed at the 1976 Summer Olympics and the 1980 Summer Olympics.
