= John Lewis (weightlifter) =

Canadian weightlifter (born 1943)

Personal information
- Nationality: Canadian
- Born: 19 January 1943 (age 83)

Sport
- Sport: Weightlifting

John Lewis (born 19 January 1943) is a Canadian weightlifter. He competed in the men's middle heavyweight event at the 1964 Summer Olympics.
