= Daniel Zayas =

Cuban weightlifter (born 1957)

Personal information
- Born: 21 July 1957 (age 67); Republic of Cuba

Sport
- Sport: Weightlifting

Daniel Zayas (born 21 July 1957) is a Cuban weightlifter. He competed in the men's middleweight event at the 1976 Summer Olympics.
