= Clyde Emrich =

American weightlifter (1931–2021)

Personal information
- Born: April 6, 1931 Chicago, Illinois, United States
- Died: November 10, 2021 (aged 90) Chicago, Illinois, United States

Sport
- Sport: Weightlifting
- Club: York Barbell Club
Medal record
Representing the United States
World Weightlifting Championships
Silver medal – second place	1955 Munich	82.5 kg
Bronze medal – third place	1954 Vienna	82.5 kg
Pan American Games
Gold medal – first place	1959 Chicago	82.5 kg

Clyde Emrich (April 6, 1931 – November 10, 2021) was an American Olympic weightlifter. He was also a long-time strength coach for the Chicago Bears, who in 2008 named their weight room after him. He is a member of the Chicagoland Sports Hall of Fame.

== Early life and family ==
Emrich was born in Chicago, Illinois. When he was a child, he enjoyed playing football and baseball. He began lifting weights at age 15 where he only weighed 110 pounds standing at 5 foot 6 inches tall. He had no coaching or training so he would turn to Strength and Health magazines for help on strength programs and how to lift. His early start to lifting weights paid off, leading him to win his high school wrestling championship and finishing the 100-yard dash in 10.2 seconds. He had five sisters and one brother. His father worked for the Pittsburgh Glass Company as a salesman.

== Career ==
Emrich was self-coached throughout his career in weightlifting. He placed eighth in the 181-pound (82.5 kg) weight class on the U.S. Olympic weightlifting team in the 1952 Summer Olympics in Helsinki, Finland. In 1954, he took 3rd place in the Senior World Championships held in Vienna, Austria. He later won the silver medal in Munich, Germany and was invited to be a part of the American team on its goodwill tour of the Far East. Emrich set his first world record on March 30, 1957. He was the first middle heavyweight at 198 pounds to clean and jerk 400 pounds. Two weeks later, he set the record to 409 pounds on the clean and jerk.

Emrich was also in the United States military. While in the military, he was stationed in Germany. He continued to strength train and competed internationally. In 1957, Emrich severely hurt his shoulder which required 18 months of treatment. In 1959, however, he competed in the Pan American Games in Chicago where he took home a gold medal. During his career, he won four Senior National titles as well as several state and regional championships.

== Organizations ==
- USA Weightlifting Hall of Fame
- Illinois State Weightlifting Hall of Fame
- USA Strength and Conditioning Coaches Hall of Fame
- Chicagoland Sports Hall of Fame
