= Lennox Kilgour =

Trinidad and Tobago weightlifter

Personal information
- Full name: Lennox Stanislaus Kilgour
- Nickname: Gour
- Born: May 5, 1927 Saint James, Trinidad and Tobago
- Died: 2004 (aged 76–77)

Sport
- Sport: Weightlifting
Medal record
Men's Weightlifting
Representing Trinidad and Tobago
Olympic Games
| Bronze medal – third place | 1952 Helsinki | Middle heavyweight |
West Indian Championships
| Gold medal – first place | 1949 | Heavyweight |
Central American Championships
| Gold medal – first place | 1950 Guatemala | Heavyweight |
Pan American Games
| Silver medal – second place | 1951 Buenos Aires | Super heavyweight |
British Empire and Commonwealth Games
| Silver medal – second place | 1954 Vancouver | Middle heavyweight |

Lennox Stanislaus Kilgour (May 5, 1927 – 2004) was a weightlifter from Trinidad and Tobago. He became West Indian champion in 1949, Central American champion in 1950, and won a bronze medal at the 1952 Summer Olympics in Helsinki. He did not compete at world championships because they were held in Europe in those years, and the Trinidad and Tobago Weightlifting Association had insufficient finances to cover traveling costs.
