= Julio Echenique =

Cuban weightlifter (born 1959)

Personal information
- Born: 27 May 1959 (age 66); Pinar del Río, Cuba

Sport
- Sport: Weightlifting

Julio Echenique (born 27 May 1959) is a Cuban weightlifter. He competed in the men's middleweight event at the 1980 Summer Olympics.
