= Víctor Pérez (weightlifter) =

Cuban weightlifter (born 1953)

Personal information
- Nationality: Cuban
- Born: 6 March 1953 (age 72)

Sport
- Sport: Weightlifting

Víctor Pérez (born 6 March 1953) is a Cuban weightlifter. He competed in the men's featherweight event at the 1980 Summer Olympics.
