= José Flores (weightlifter) =

Dutch weightlifter (1936–2017)

Personal information
- Nationality: Dutch
- Born: 22 December 1936 Curaçao, Colony of Curaçao and Dependencies, Netherlands
- Died: 9 January 2017 (aged 80)

Sport
- Sport: Weightlifting

José Flores (22 December 1936 – 9 January 2017) was a Dutch weightlifter. He competed for Netherlands Antilles in the men's middle heavyweight event at the 1960 Summer Olympics.

Flores died on 9 January 2017, the age of 80.
