= Paul Bjarnason =

Canadian weightlifter (born 1944)

Personal information
- Nationality: Canadian
- Born: 22 November 1944 (age 81) Vancouver, British Columbia, Canada

Sport
- Sport: Weightlifting

Paul Bjarnason (born 22 November 1944) is a Canadian weightlifter. He competed in the men's middle heavyweight event at the 1968 Summer Olympics.
