= Chun Hon Chan =

Canadian weightlifter (1935–2004)

Personal information
- Nationality: Canadian
- Born: 21 July 1935 Hong Kong
- Died: 3 March 2004 (aged 68) Montreal, Quebec, Canada

Sport
- Sport: Weightlifting
Medal record
Men's weightlifting
Representing Canada
British Empire and Commonwealth Games
Bronze medal – third place	1966 Kingston	Bantamweight

Chun Hon Chan (21 July 1935 – 3 March 2004) was a Canadian weightlifter. He competed at the 1968 Summer Olympics and the 1972 Summer Olympics.
