= Cara Heads =

American weightlifter (born 1977)

Personal information
- Born: October 7, 1977 (age 48) Costa Mesa, California, U.S.
Medal record
Women's weightlifting
Representing United States
Pan American Games
Silver medal – second place	1999 Winnipeg	– 75 kg

Cara Heads (born October 7, 1977) is an Olympic weightlifter for the United States. Her coaches are Tony Ciarelli and Stephanie Ciarelli, Howard Cohen, Bob Morris and Dr. Kyle Pierce.

== Early life ==
Sports have always been a part of Heads' life. Throughout high school, she was a scholar athlete and played 3 different sports. She played basketball. competed in track and field, and weightlifting. She was selected onto the All Orange County track and field team. In basketball, her team was Co-Champion of the Sea View League, two time CIF finalists, and state regional finalists. As a weightlifter, Heads qualified for the Junior World Weightlifting Championships in Warsaw, Poland.

== Education ==
Heads obtained her degree from the University of California Berkeley where she also participated in track and field. She competed in the hammer throw and in her freshman year earned 3rd place in the Pacific Athletic Conference Track and Field championships.

After her first year in school, Heads transitioned her focus from track and field to weightlifting. She decided to drop out of school and pursue her career in weightlifting and train amongst the best female weightlifters. After the Olympic Games she went back to California Berkeley to finish her degree.

== Career ==
Heads, at one point, was one of the top seven weightlifters in the world in her weight class.

== Weightlifting achievements ==
- Olympic team member (2000)
- Bronze Medalist in Junior World Championships (1997)
- Silver Medalist in Pan Am Championships (1999)
- Titan Games Champion (2004)
- Senior World Championships team member (1998, 1999, 2002, & 2004)
- Pan Am Games team member (2003)
- Gold Medalist in NACACI Championships (1997)
- Silver Medalist in 1997 Silver Dragon Championships
- Gold Medalist in Copa Guatemala Championships (1995 & 1997)
- Senior National Champion (1997, 1998, 2000, 2002–2005)
- Junior National Champion (1996 & 1997)
- American Open Champion (2002–2004)
- Best Lifter at Junior National Championships (1996)
