= Carlos Chávez (weightlifter) =

Panamanian weightlifter (1928–2006)

Personal information
- Born: 4 November 1928; Penonomé, Panama
- Died: 2 June 2006 (aged 77)

Sport
- Sport: Weightlifting

Carlos Chávez Gordón (4 November 1928 – 2 June 2006) was a Panamanian weightlifter. He competed in the men's featherweight event at the 1952 Summer Olympics, where his 90 points left him at the bottom of the table.
