= Price Morris =

Canadian weightlifter (born 1941)

Personal information
- Born: 22 October 1941 (age 85) Frankford, Ontario, Canada

Sport
- Sport: Weightlifting

Price Morris (born 22 October 1941) is a Canadian weightlifter. He competed in the men's heavyweight event at the 1972 Summer Olympics.
