= Lester Francel =

Colombian weightlifter (1950–2021)

Personal information
- Nationality: Colombian
- Born: 14 April 1950; Armero, Colombia
- Died: 14 March 2021 (aged 70); Medellín, Colombia

Sport
- Sport: Weightlifting

Lester Francel (14 April 1950 – 14 March 2021) was a Colombian weightlifter. He competed in the men's flyweight event at the 1972 Summer Olympics.
