= Chad Vaughn =

American weightlifter (born 1980)

Chad Vaughn OLY
Personal information
- Full name: Chad Thomas Vaughn
- Born: May 11, 1980 (age 46) Konawa, Oklahoma, U.S.
Medal record
Men's weightlifting
Representing the United States
Pan American Games
Gold medal – first place	2003 Santo Domingo	– 77 kg
Bronze medal – third place	2011 Guadalajara	– 77kg

Chad Thomas Vaughn OLY (born May 11, 1980) is an American Olympic weightlifter.

He was a member of the 2004 Olympic team in Athens, Greece, and ranked 18th in the 77 kg category, lifting a total of 320 kg.

He competed in the 85 kg category at the 2005 World Weightlifting Championships, and ranked 14th lifting a total of 335 kg.

At the 2007 World Weightlifting Championships he ranked 24th in the 77 kg category, lifting a total of 326 kg.

He qualified for the 2008 Summer Olympics.

Vaughn currently resides in San Antonio, Texas, and is coached by Richard Flemming.
