= Rich Schutz =

American weightlifter

Richard George "Rich" Schutz (born December 21, 1965) is a former Olympic weightlifter for the United States. He was born in Chicago, Illinois.

== Weightlifting achievements ==
- Olympic team member (1988 and 1992)
- Senior National Champion (1986–1994)
