= Keith Adams (weightlifter) =

Canadian weightlifter (born 1950)

Personal information
- Nationality: Canadian
- Born: 20 June 1950 (age 76)
- Height: 1.67 m (5 ft 6 in)
- Weight: 75 kg (165 lb)

Sport
- Sport: Weightlifting

Keith Adams (born 20 June 1950) is a Canadian weightlifter. He competed in the 1972 Summer Olympics.
