= Pete George =

American weightlifter (1929–2021)

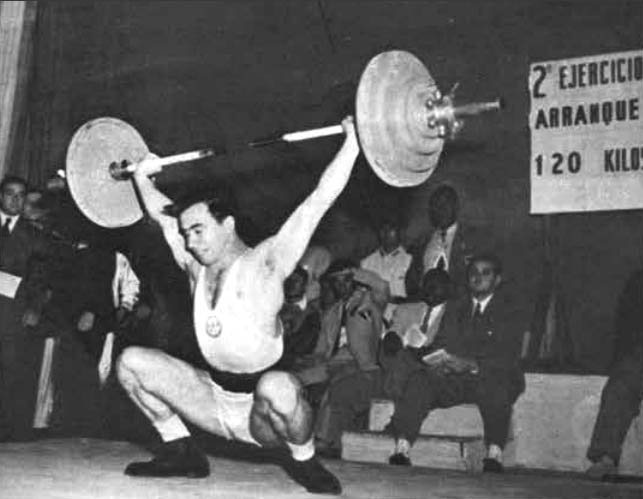
- George competing at the 1951 Pan American Games

Personal information
- Full name: Peter T. George
- Born: June 29, 1929 Akron, Ohio, U.S.
- Died: July 27, 2021 (aged 92)
Medal record
Men's weightlifting
Representing the United States
Olympic Games
| Gold medal – first place | 1952 Helsinki | -75 kg |
| Silver medal – second place | 1948 London | -75 kg |
| Silver medal – second place | 1956 Melbourne | -75 kg |
Pan American Games
| Gold medal – first place | 1951 Buenos Aires | Weightlifting |

Peter T. George (June 29, 1929 – July 27, 2021) was an American weightlifter and Olympic and World champion. He was later an assistant professor of stomatology. George was the first weightlifter of Bulgarian descent to win Olympic gold, which has since been achieved by other Bulgarian Olympians.

== Biography ==
His Bulgarian parents (Note: The cited source describes his parents first as "Macedonian immigrants" and then as ""Bulgarian immigrants") (Note: The author describes his parents and himself as "Bulgarians" stating that "Macedonian" is simply a geographic designation: My parents, however were Bulgarians born in Macedonia. I, therefore must say, my nationality is Bulgarian.) Trayan and Paraskeva Taleff originated from Bitola, from where they immigrated to the U.S. in 1929. His father was an activist of the Macedonian Patriotic Organization and both his parents were members of the Macedono-Bulgarian St. Elia the Prophet Orthodox Church (Akron, Ohio).

Born in Akron, Ohio, George was the first 15-year-old to clean and jerk 300 lbs and was the youngest senior state champion of Ohio at 14 and 1/2. His brother Jim is also a weightlifter. Pete won a gold medal at the 1952 Summer Olympics in Helsinki. George also received silver medals at the 1948 Summer Olympics in London, and at the 1956 Summer Olympics in Melbourne. He also won five World Championships outside of the Olympics in 1947, 1951, 1953, 1954, and 1955. George placed second at the World Championships in 1949 and 1950, making a total of ten medals in World and Olympic competition. He also set four world records, three in the clean and jerk, and one in the total.

After retiring from athletics, he attended Kent State University, the Ohio State University, and Columbia University. George became an orthodontist and served on the faculty of the University of Hawaii. He pioneered treatments for obstructive sleep apnea. He held the patent for the Nocturnal Airway Patency Appliance (NAPA), a device preventing the stoppage of breathing during sleep. After retirement, George used to spend summertime in the birthplace of his wife, Ognyanovo, Blagoevgrad Province, Bulgaria. He is also described sometimes as a Macedonian American, and thus in 1993 George was awarded the Macedonian Hall of Fame Award by the Macedonian Businessmen's Club in Akron, Ohio.
