= Fernando Bernal =

Cuban weightlifter (born 1941)

Personal information
- Nationality: Cuban
- Born: 7 May 1941 (age 84)

Sport
- Sport: Weightlifting

Fernando Bernal (born 7 May 1941) is a Cuban weightlifter. He competed in the men's super heavyweight event at the 1972 Summer Olympics.
