= Russell Knipp =

American weightlifter (1942–2006)

Russell Lowell Knipp (May 21, 1942 – April 9, 2006) was an American weightlifter who held nine world records and thirty-four American records.

He was born May 21, 1942, in Pittsburgh, Pennsylvania. He competed in two Olympic Games for the U.S. team: Mexico City in 1968 and Munich, Germany in 1972. During his career he won seventeen gold medals in international competition and was a three-time U.S. national champion and two-time Pan American Games champion. He was inducted in the USAW Hall of Fame and the Helms Amateur Athletes Hall of Fame in Los Angeles. He set nine world records in press during his career.

Knipp, a longtime resident of Orange County, California, died of a heart attack while playing golf in Santa Ana on April 9, 2006. He is buried in Jefferson Memorial Cemetery in Pleasant Hills, Pennsylvania, a south suburb of Pittsburgh.

At the time of his death he was in training to compete in the "Strongest Man Over 60 Contest". He was then lifting greater than the current "Over 60's Record" when he unexpectedly died.
