= Mike Karchut =

American weightlifter

- Born: August 27, 1944; Delmenhorst, Niedersachsen, Germany
- Education: Case Western Reserve University
- Occupation: Weightlifter

Mike Karchut (born August 27, 1944) is a German-born American weightlifter. He competed both as a student at Case Western Reserve University, and after graduation. He was an Olympic weightlifter for the United States in 1972 and 1980.

== Weightlifting achievements ==
- Olympic Games team member (1972 & 1980)
- Senior National Champion (1969–1973, 1975, 1978, 1980)
