= Carlos Lastre =

Cuban weightlifter (born 1950)

Personal information
- Nationality: Cuban
- Born: 27 June 1950 (age 74)

Sport
- Sport: Weightlifting

Carlos Lastre (born 27 June 1950) is a Cuban weightlifter. He competed in the men's bantamweight event at the 1976 Summer Olympics.
