= Fortunato Rijna =

Dutch Antillean weightlifter

Personal information
- Nationality: Dutch Antillean
- Born: 29 May 1938 (age 87); Curaçao

Sport
- Sport: Weightlifting

Fortunato Theodoro Rijna (born 29 May 1938) is a Dutch Antillean weightlifter. He competed at the 1964 Summer Olympics and the 1968 Summer Olympics.
