= Wayne Wilson (weightlifter) =

Canadian weightlifter (born 1949)

Personal information
- Nationality: Canadian
- Born: 1 November 1949 (age 77) Toronto, Ontario, Canada

Sport
- Sport: Weightlifting

Wayne Wilson (born 1 November 1949) is a Canadian weightlifter. He competed in the men's middle heavyweight event at the 1972 Summer Olympics.
