= Osvaldo Forte =

Argentine weightlifter (1919–2005)

Personal information
- Nationality: Argentine
- Born: 1 June 1919
- Died: 29 July 2005 (aged 86)

Sport
- Sport: Weightlifting

Osvaldo Forte (1 June 1919 – 29 July 2005) was an Argentine weightlifter. He competed at the 1948 Summer Olympics and the 1952 Summer Olympics.
