= Rolando Chang =

Cuban weightlifter (born 1946)

Personal information
- Born: 6 March 1946 (age 79); Guantánamo, Cuba

Sport
- Sport: Weightlifting
- Coached by: Hildo Romero Cuenca

Rolando Chang Pérez (born 6 March 1946) is a Cuban weightlifter. He competed in the men's featherweight event at the 1972 Summer Olympics.
