= Anthony Phillips (weightlifter) =

Barbadian weightlifter (1940–2008)

Personal information
- Nationality: Barbadian
- Born: 5 February 1940
- Died: 20 June 2008 (aged 68)

Sport
- Sport: Weightlifting

Anthony Phillips (5 February 1940 – 20 June 2008) was a Barbadian weightlifter. He competed at the 1968 Summer Olympics and the 1972 Summer Olympics.
