= San Lázaro de la Cruz =

Dominican Republic weightlifter

Personal information
- Nationality: Dominican
- Born: 20 January 1950 (age 75); San Pedro de Macorís, Dominican Republic

Sport
- Sport: Weightlifting

San Lázaro de la Cruz (born 20 January 1950) is a Dominican Republic former weightlifter. He competed in the men's flyweight event at the 1976 Summer Olympics.
