= Francisco Casamayor =

Cuban weightlifter (1949–2005)

Personal information
- Nationality: Cuban
- Born: 29 January 1949
- Died: 11 July 2005 (aged 56)

Sport
- Sport: Weightlifting

Francisco Casamayor (29 January 1949 – 11 July 2005) was a Cuban weightlifter. He competed at the 1976 Summer Olympics and the 1980 Summer Olympics.
