= Luiz de Almeida =

Brazilian weightlifter (born 1941)

Personal information
- Born: 20 August 1941 (age 83); Mucugê, Brazil

Sport
- Sport: Weightlifting

Luiz de Almeida (born 20 August 1941) is a Brazilian weightlifter. He competed at the 1968 Summer Olympics and the 1972 Summer Olympics.
