= Gary Deal =

American weightlifter (1940–2026)

Gary Deal (April 2, 1940 – November 18, 2026) was a weightlifter for the United States.

== Early life ==
At only 10 years old, Deal was diagnosed with polio. This disease left him with a shrunken and weak right arm, shoulder, and right leg. The whole right side of his body was impaired and the only way he was able to move his right arm was with the assistance of his left arm. Deal's determination and will led to a slow and painful process of developing the muscles on the right side of his body.

At 16 years old, he saw another person his age with a big arm who trained with weights. Standing at 6 feet tall weighing only 150 pounds, moving around was a difficult task for him. He began training with a barbell and eventually worked his way up to pressing 85 lbs, snatching 70 lbs, and jerking 100 lbs. However, his left side was doing most of the work. After extensive training with one of his friends, Deal slowly began to develop his right side.

When Deal was 17 years old, he competed at a weightlifting meet in Omaha. At this event, he totaled 470 lbs on three lifts in the 181 lb category. Deal continued to work hard and strive towards getting stronger. He later won the heavyweight title in the Midwestern district and in 1958 won the National Teenage title in his class. During this time he weighed in at 201 lbs and lifted 220 on clean and press, 235 in snatch, and 330 on clean and jerk. Just two years later, he took second place in the Junior Nationals with a total of 800 lbs in the 198 lb weight class. At a later meet, in Omaha, Deal clean and jerked 345 lbs. Soon after, Deal married his wife and took a small break from lifting and competing.

Deal took nearly two years off where his training was obsolete until he started implementing isometric training. This led to an increase in all of his lifts totaling 875 pounds. After he hit this landmark, he had another period of almost nonexistent gains because he was so busy with work. Deal had always been a split lifter but decided to train with the squat style. After spending two years mastering this technique, he realized this was the right style for him.

Deal later learned of the power rack. He cut out the floor of his basement, dug down about two feet and built himself a power rack. Here he was able to use heavy weight on the rack which led to an exponential increase in his lifting numbers. He would perform 1 set of 3 reps in 3 different positions. For each position, Deal would place the pins about a foot apart and then pull the top pin and hold the bar against the top pin for about 6 seconds on the 3rd rep.

Deal died on November 18, 2026, at the age of 86.

== Weightlifting achievements ==
- Pan Am Games Champion (1971)
- Senior World Team Member (4th Place in 1969)
- Senior National Champion (1971)
- Silver Medalist at Senior National Championships (1969 and 1970)
- Former American record holder
- World Masters Games Champion (2005)
- National Masters Champion (2005)
- American Masters Champion (2005)
- American Masters record holder in snatch, clean and jerk, and total
- Awarded Grand Master Designation (2006)
