= Manuel Mateos =

Mexican weightlifter (born 1950)

Personal information
- Born: 9 December 1950 (age 74); Tampico, Mexico

Sport
- Sport: Weightlifting

Manuel Mateos (born 9 December 1950) is a Mexican weightlifter. He competed in the men's featherweight event at the 1968 Summer Olympics.
