= Overhead press =

Weight training exercise

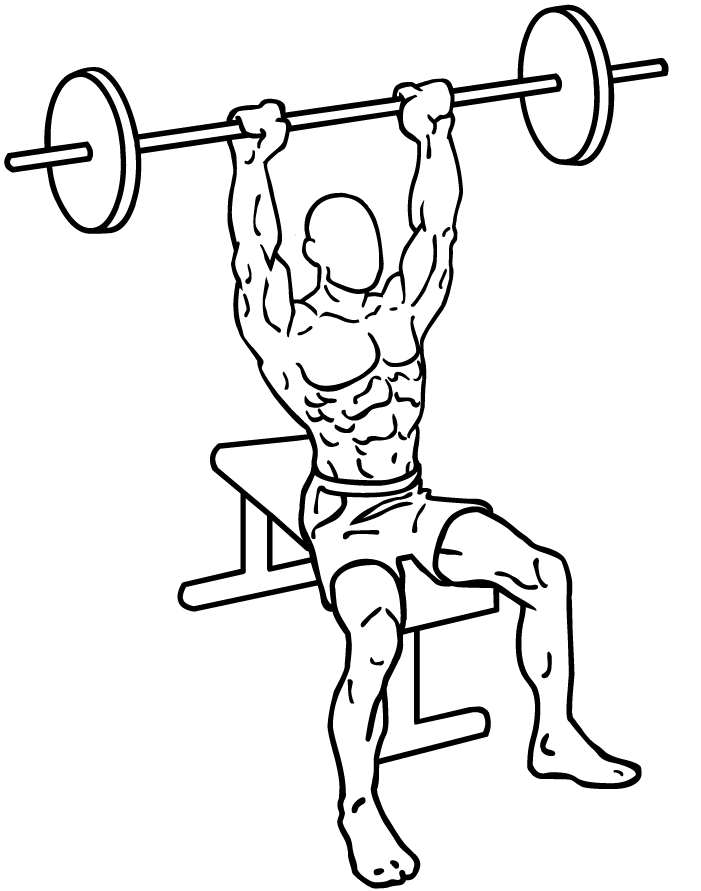
Seated military shoulder press

The overhead press, also known as the shoulder press, strict press or military press, is an upper-body weight training exercise in which the trainee presses a weight overhead while seated or standing. It is mainly used to develop the anterior deltoid muscles of the shoulder.

The lift is set up by taking either a barbell, a pair of dumbbells or kettlebells, and holding them at shoulder level. The weight is then pressed overhead. While the exercise can be performed standing or seated, standing requires more muscles as more balancing is required in order to support the lift. Other variations of the exercise include the push press, a similar movement that involves an additional dipping motion in the legs to increase momentum. An overhead press may also be performed unilaterally, with the lift being performed one handed; or in an alternating fashion with both hands holding a dumbbell or kettlebell, and then pressing with one arm and then the other.

== In strength sports ==
=== Weightlifting ===
The standing version was once a component of the sport of Olympic weightlifting as part of the clean and press movement, but was removed in 1972 due to difficulties in judging proper technique.

=== Strongman ===
In the sport of strongman, overhead presses are quite frequent where athletes are required to press implements such as logs and axles in addition to standard barbells. Strict presses, push presses and push jerks are often incorporated.

=== Bodybuilding ===
Bodybuilders have also been using overhead presses as a staple to develop their shoulders. They primarily focus on strict presses to isolate the deltoids.

== See also ==
- Bench press
- Clean and press
- Push press
