= Cal Schake =

American weightlifter

Cal Schake was an Olympic weightlifter for the United States. His coach was Marty Cypher.

== Weightlifting achievements ==
- 1980 Olympic team member
- Bronze Medalist in Pan American Games (1983)
- Senior National Champion (1980-1983, 1986 + 1987)
- Senior American Record Holder (1972-1992) with a 152.5 kg snatch in the 75 kg weight class
