= Bruno Barabani =

Brazilian weightlifter (1932–2015)

Personal information
- Born: 26 July 1932; São Paulo, Brazil
- Died: 28 March 2015 (aged 82)

Sport
- Sport: Weightlifting

Bruno Barabani (26 July 1932 – 28 March 2015) was a Brazilian weightlifter. He competed at the 1952 Summer Olympics, the 1956 Summer Olympics and the 1960 Summer Olympics.
