= Rick Holbrook =

American weightlifter (1948–2007)

Rick Holbrook (May 22, 1948 in Chicago, Illinois – December 23, 2007) was an Olympic weightlifter for the United States.

== About ==
Patrick Joseph "Rick" Holbrook Jr. competed in his weightlifting competitions at 198 lbs standing at 5 foot 10 inches tall.

== Organizations ==
Holbrook is a member of the York Barbell Club, York.

== Career ==
Holbrook was known for his infamous speed and technique in his lifting. He was more successful in his quick lifts than the presses.

== Personal Bests ==
In 1972, Holbrook worked his way up to lifting a total of 512.5 kg. He pressed 162.5 kg. snatched 155.0 kg. and 197.5 kg on the clean & jerk.

== Weightlifting achievements ==
- Olympic Games team member (1972)
- Senior National Champion (1971 and 1972)
- Competed in World Championships (1970 & 1971) taking 7th place in 1971
- AAU champion (1971 & 1972)
- Named Best Lifter at AAUs (1972)
- Won silver medal at Pan American Games (1971)
