= Hugo Gittens =

Trinidad and Tobago weightlifter

Personal information
- Born: 24 September 1936 (age 88); Morvant, Trinidad and Tobago

Sport
- Sport: Weightlifting

Hugo Gittens (born 24 September 1936) is a weightlifter from Trinidad and Tobago. He represented the country at the 1964 Summer Olympics and the 1968 Summer Olympics. Additionally, Gittens won a gold medal at the 1966 Commonwealth Games and placed fourth in the 1970 Commonwealth Games in the 67.5 kg combined men's weightlifting event.
