= Víctor Ángel Pagán =

Puerto Rican weightlifter (born 1939)

Angel Víctor Pagán
Personal information
- Nationality: Puerto Rican
- Born: 20 February 1939 (age 86); Aguadilla, Puerto Rico

Sport
- Sport: Weightlifting

Víctor Ángel Pagán (born 20 February 1939) is a Puerto Rican weightlifter. He competed at the 1964 Summer Olympics, the 1968 Summer Olympics and the 1972 Summer Olympics.
