= Tony Garcy =

American weightlifter (born 1939)

Personal information
- Nationality: American
- Born: June 20, 1939 (age 87)

Sport
- Sport: Weightlifting

Tony Garcy (born June 20, 1939) is an American former weightlifter. He competed in the men's lightweight event at the 1964 Summer Olympics.
