= Brandon Bailey (weightlifter) =

Trinidad and Tobago weightlifter

Personal information
- Nationality: Trinidad and Tobago
- Born: 5 November 1932
- Died: 9 October 2013 (aged 80)

Sport
- Sport: Weightlifting

Brandon Bailey (5 November 1932 – 9 October 2013) was a Trinidad and Tobago weightlifter. He competed in the men's heavyweight event at the 1964 Summer Olympics.
