= Ángel Famiglietti =

Panamanian weightlifter (1927–2001)

Personal information
- Born: 7 September 1927; Panama City, Panama
- Died: 11 August 2001 (aged 73)

Sport
- Sport: Weightlifting

Ángel Famiglietti (7 September 1927 – 11 August 2001) was a Panamanian weightlifter. He competed in the men's featherweight event at the 1960 Summer Olympics.
