= Abel López =

Cuban weightlifter (born 1947)

Personal information
- Full name: Abel López Arozarena
- Born: 25 March 1947 (age 79) Havana, Cuba
- Height: 170 cm (5 ft 7 in)
- Weight: 183 lb (83 kg)

Sport
- Sport: Weightlifting

Abel López Arozarena (Note: In this Spanish name, the first or paternal surname is López and the second or maternal family name is Arozarena.) (born 25 March 1947) is a Cuban weightlifter. He competed at the 1968 Summer Olympics and the 1972 Summer Olympics.
