= Ildefonso Lee =

Panamanian weightlifter (born 1936)

Personal information
- Born: 12 March 1936 (age 89); Panama City, Panama

Sport
- Sport: Weightlifting

Ildefonso Lee (born 12 March 1936) is a Panamanian weightlifter. He competed at the 1964 Summer Olympics, the 1968 Summer Olympics and the 1972 Summer Olympics.
