= Fernando Báez (weightlifter) =

Puerto Rican weightlifter (born 1941)

Personal information
- Full name: Fernando Luis Báez Cruz
- Born: 25 July 1941 (age 84) Adjuntas, Puerto Rico
- Height: 153 cm (5 ft 0 in)
- Weight: 55 kg (121 lb)

Sport
- Country: Puerto Rico
- Sport: Weightlifting
- Weight class: 56 kg
- Team: National Team
Medal record
Men's Weightlifting
Representing Puerto Rico
World Championships
Bronze medal – third place	1969	56 kg (press)
- Updated on 12 November 2016

Fernando Luis Báez Cruz (born 25 July 1941 in Adjuntas) is a Puerto Rican male former weightlifter, who competed in the 56 kg category and represented Puerto Rico at international competitions. He won the bronze medal in the press at the 1969 World Weightlifting Championships lifting 115.0 kg. He participated at the 1972 Summer Olympics in the 56 kg event. He set four bantamweight press world records.
