= Mark Cameron (weightlifter) =

American weightlifter

Mark Cameron (born October 10, 1952) is an American athlete. He was an Olympic weightlifter for the United States.

== Personal information ==
Cameron was born in Clinton, Massachusetts in 1952. As a grown adult, Cameron stood at 5 foot 10 inches and weighed 240 pounds.

== Organizations ==
Cameron was affiliated with the Central Falls Weightlifting Club (RI) and later with the York Barbell Club in York, Pennsylvania.

== Weightlifting achievements ==
- Bronze Medalist in Senior World Championships (1977)
- Pan American Games Champion (1979)
- Silver Medalist in Pan Am Games (1975)
- Senior National Champion (1975–1980)
- Olympic Games team member (1976 and 1980)
- Lightest and youngest American to clean and jerk over 500 pounds.
- Senior American record holder in clean and jerk (1972–1992).
- Served as Chairman of the Board for USA Weightlifting (2008–2010).
