= Joe Puleo =

American weightlifter (born 1942)

Joe Puleo (born 1942) was an Olympic weightlifter for the United States.

== About ==
Joseph "Joe" Robert Puleo was born in Detroit, Michigan. He was an attorney, but is now retired and living in Fort Myers, Florida.. He competed in his weightlifting competitions as a middleweight, light-heavyweight, and middle-heavyweight.

== Organizations ==
Puleo was a member of the York Barbell Club, York.

== Weightlifting achievements ==
- Olympic team member (1968 and 1980)
- Senior National Champion (1962, 1964, 1966, 1967, and 1968)
- 1st in the Pan American Games Middleweight class (1963)
- 1st in the Pan American Games Light-heavyweight class (1967)
