= Phil Grippaldi =

American weightlifter (born 1946)

Phillip Salvatore Grippaldi (born 1946) is an Olympic weightlifter who competed for the United States at the games in 1968, 1972 and 1976. His coaches were James "Butch" Toth and Mike Huszka.

== Early age ==
Grippaldi was born on September 27, 1946, in Newark, New Jersey, in 1946 and was raised in nearby Belleville, New Jersey. At an early age, Grippaldi was exposed to bodybuilding. One of his neighbors, Mike Gubliano, was a bodybuilder though he never competed in any events. Gubliano had a lot of influence on Grippaldi in the early years of his life. Gubliano excelled in training his arms. With arms of 22 inches, he was a man worth listening to when it came to working our your arms. In 1966, Gubliano ended up becoming a bodyguard for the model Twiggy. Grippaldi could not help but to start training with Gubliano's arm workouts as soon as he entered puberty. Gubliano took Grippaldi through his three-hour-long arm workouts. At only age 16, Grippaldi had 19-inch arms, which would later be what he was known for.

== Weightlifting achievements ==
- Olympic Games team member (1968, 1972, 1976)
- Silver Medalist at Senior World Championships (1970)
- Pan Am Games Champion (1971 and 1975)
- Senior National Champion (1967, 1968, 1970, and 1973-1975)
- Teenage National Champion (1966)
