= Clean and press =

Weight training exercise

The clean and press is a two-part weight training exercise whereby a loaded barbell is lifted from the floor to the shoulders (the clean) and pushed overhead (the press). The lift was a component of the sport of Olympic weightlifting from 1928 to 1972, but was removed due to difficulties in judging proper technique. Before that, weightlifter Vasily Ivanovich Alekseyev set the clean and press world record on 15 April 1972 in Tallinn, lifting 236.5 kg (521 lbs).

== Movement ==
=== Clean phase ===
In the clean movement, after taking a big breath and setting the back, the lifter jumps the bar up through triple extension (in very quick succession) of the hips, knees and then ankles. When the legs have driven the bar as high as possible, the lifter pulls under the bar by violently shrugging (contracting) the trapezius muscles of the upper back ("traps") dropping into a deep squat position and spinning the hands around the bar so the elbows are extended in front.

At the same time, the arms are brought up with the elbows extended in front of the chest so the bar may now lie across or "rest" across the palms, the front of the shoulder or deltoid muscles, and the clavicles. At this point the lifter should be in a full squat position, with his buttocks on or very close to the heels, sitting erect with the bar resting comfortably across the deltoids and fingers. By keeping a rigid torso and maintaining a deep breath hold the bar bends over the lifter's clavicle.

=== Press phase ===
Once the bar is on the anterior deltoids, the lifter proceeds to the press, pushing the bar overhead and locking it out with completely extended arms. Jerking movements, bending of the legs, excessive backward leaning, or displacement of the feet are prohibited.

== Removal from the Olympics ==
Hungarian weightlifter Győző Veres demonstrates a "layback" press in 1963.

By the 1950s, lax enforcement of the rules in international competition had allowed the press phase of the lift, by rule an upright, rigid body movement performed by the shoulders and arms, to evolve into a "layback" movement that utilized the larger muscles of the legs, hips, and torso, enabling the lifter to "cheat" to lift more weight. Historian John D. Fair wrote: "The rules had been clear about maintaining a vertical position and disallowing bending of the legs since the 1930s, but much depended on how these movements were interpreted and the political dispositions of officials and juries." In 1964, Olympic weightlifting referee George W. Kirkley wrote that the "clause of the rule which defines the permitted lean-back as 'not exaggerated' is in my view a weak spot, because it is virtually impossible to get any universal agreement of interpretation as to what constitutes 'exaggerated.'"

After World War II, the situation was compounded by Cold War tensions: in 1956, Bob Hoffman, coach of the U.S. Olympic weightlifting team, accused international judges of pro-Soviet, anti-American bias, disqualifying legal American presses and allowing rule-breaking Soviet ones. Fair, however, while acknowledging the Soviet role in the erosion of press form, wrote that "the twin trends of loose pressing and lax officiating were well in place" before the Soviets entered international competition. The International Weightlifting Federation resolved the situation by removing the clean and press from the Olympic weightlifting program after the 1972 games in Munich.

== See also ==
- Clean and jerk
