= List of Pan American Games medalists in roller sports =

This is the complete list of Pan American medalists in roller sports.

== Artistic roller skating ==
=== Men's ===
==== Free skating ====
Games	Gold	Silver	Bronze
1995 Mar del Plata	Eric Anderson; United States	Edwin Guevara; Colombia	Heath Medeiros; United States
1999 Winnipeg	Walter Iglesias; Argentina	Eric Anderson; United States	Diego Alencar; Brazil
2003 Santo Domingo	Marcel Stürmer; Brazil	Daniel Arriola; Argentina	Maurício Jaramillo; Colombia
2007 Rio de Janeiro	Marcel Stürmer; Brazil	Daniel Arriola; Argentina	Josh Rhoads; United States
2011 Guadalajara	Marcel Stürmer; Brazil	Daniel Arriola; Argentina	Leonardo Parrado; Colombia
2015 Toronto	Marcel Stürmer; Brazil	John Burchfield; United States	Diego Duque; Colombia
2019 Lima	Juan Sánchez; Argentina	John Burchfield; United States	Gustavo Casado; Brazil
2023 Santiago	Erik Medziukevicius; Brazil	Franco Mastroianni; Argentina	Deivi Rojas; Colombia

==== Figure skating ====
Games	Gold	Silver	Bronze
1987 Indianapolis	Skip Clinton; United States	Kevin Carroll; United States	Juan Reckziegel; Argentina
1995 Mar del Plata	Steven Findlay; United States	Ernesto Tamagnon; Argentina	Jason Moreton; Canada

==== Long Program ====
Games	Gold	Silver	Bronze
1979 San Juan	Fred Morante; United States	Alexander Kane; United States	Guy Aubin; Canada
1987 Indianapolis	Gregg Smith; United States	Scott Cohen; United States	Edwin Guevara; Colombia

=== Women's ===
==== Free skating ====
Games	Gold	Silver	Bronze
1987 Indianapolis	Debbie Erdman; United States	Renee Gerig; United States	Claudia DiLuciano; Argentina
1995 Mar del Plata	Dezera Salas; United States	Canela Emede; Argentina	Maria Rodriguez; Argentina
1999 Winnipeg	Patricia Houle; United States	Florencia Sachero; Argentina	Janaína Espíndola; Brazil
2003 Santo Domingo	Heather Munckey; United States	Melissa Linsalata; Argentina	Mayra Ramos; Brazil
2007 Rio de Janeiro	Leila Vanzulli; Argentina	Abigail Burris; United States	Juliana Almeida; Brazil
2011 Guadalajara	Elizabeth Soler; Argentina	Marisol Villarroel; Chile	Talitha Haas; Brazil
2015 Toronto	Giselle Soler; Argentina	Talitha Haas; Brazil	Marisol Villarroel; Chile
2019 Lima	Bruna Wurts; Brazil	Giselle Soler; Argentina	Eduarda Fuentes; Ecuador
2023 Santiago	Sandra García; Colombia	Bianca Ameixeiro; Brazil	Martina Della Chiesa; Argentina

==== Figure skating ====
Games	Gold	Silver	Bronze
1987 Indianapolis	Debbie Erdman; United States	Renee Gerig; United States	Claudia DiLuciano; Argentina
1995 Mar del Plata	April Dayney; United States	Jennifer Jill Rodriguez; United States	Carolina Pogliano; Argentina

==== Long Program ====
Games	Gold	Silver	Bronze
1979 San Juan	Natalie Dunn; United States	JoAnne Young; United States	Sylvie Gingras; Canada

=== Mixed ===
==== Pairs ====
Games	Gold	Silver	Bronze
1979 San Juan	United States	United States	Canada
1987 Indianapolis	United States	United States	Colombia
1995 Mar del Plata	Argentina	United States	United States
1999 Winnipeg	Argentina; Gabriela Mugica; Flavio Fissolo	United States; April Corley; Brian Richardson	Brazil; Luciana Roiha; Max Santos

==== Dance ====
Games	Gold	Silver	Bronze
1979 San Juan	United States	United States	Canada
1987 Indianapolis	United States	United States	Canada
1995 Mar del Plata	United States	Canada	Argentina
1999 Winnipeg	United States; Melissa Quinn; Adam White	Uruguay; Karina Rocha; Germán Alves	Canada; Sherri Bint; Ron Woods

== Roller speed skating ==
=== Men's ===
==== 200 metres ====
Time Trial

Games	Gold	Silver	Bronze
2015 Toronto	Emanuelle Silva; Chile	Pedro Causil; Colombia	Jorge Martínez; Mexico
2023 Santiago	Emanuelle Silva; Chile	Jorge Martínez; Mexico	Andrés Jiménez; Colombia

==== 300 metres ====
Time Trial

Games	Gold	Silver	Bronze
1987 Indianapolis	José Lozano; Argentina	Doug Glass; United States	Anthony Muse; United States
1991 Havana	Anthony Muse; United States	Orlando Valencia; Colombia	Doug Glass; United States
2011 Guadalajara	Pedro Causil; Colombia	Emanuelle Silva; Chile	Juan Cruz Araldi; Argentina
2019 Lima	Pedro Causil; Colombia	Johan Guzmán; Venezuela	Jorge Martínez; Mexico

Road

Games	Gold	Silver	Bronze
1995 Mar del Plata	Derek Parra; United States	Anthony Muse; United States	Sergio McCargo; Argentina

Track

Games	Gold	Silver	Bronze
1995 Mar del Plata	Anthony Muse; United States	Derek Parra; United States	Sergio McCargo; Argentina

==== 500 metres ====
Games	Gold	Silver	Bronze
1979 San Juan	Kenneth Sutton; United States	Curtis Cook; United States	Reynaldo Vega; Argentina
2015 Toronto	Pedro Causil; Colombia	Ezequiel Capellano; Argentina	Jorge Martínez; Mexico
2019 Lima	Pedro Causil; Colombia	Jorge Martínez; Mexico	Johan Guzmán; Venezuela
2023 Santiago	Andrés Jiménez; Colombia	Carlos Monsivais; Mexico	Emanuelle Silva; Chile

Pair elimination

Games	Gold	Silver	Bronze
1979 San Juan	Kenneth Sutton; United States	Reynaldo Vega; Argentina	Raul Subiledt; Argentina

Road

Games	Gold	Silver	Bronze
1995 Mar del Plata	Anthony Muse; United States	Julián Fernández; Colombia	Sergio McCargo; Argentina

Track

Games	Gold	Silver	Bronze
1995 Mar del Plata	Anthony Muse; United States	Derek Parra; United States	Adrian Villegas; Argentina

==== 1000 metres ====
Games	Gold	Silver	Bronze
2011 Guadalajara	Pedro Causil; Colombia	Ezequiel Capellano; Argentina	Jorge Reyes; Chile
2023 Santiago	Juan Mantilla; Colombia	Andrés Jiménez; Colombia	Hugo Ramírez; Chile

==== 1500 metres ====
Games	Gold	Silver	Bronze
1987 Indianapolis	Dante Muse; United States	Guillermo McCargo; Argentina	Hernán Díaz; Colombia
1991 Havana	Guillermo Botero; Colombia	Guillermo Herrero; Argentina	Dante Muse; United States

Road

Games	Gold	Silver	Bronze
1995 Mar del Plata	Derek Parra; United States	Jorge Botejo Naranjo; Colombia	Chad Hedrick; United States

Track

Games	Gold	Silver	Bronze
1995 Mar del Plata	Julián Fernández; Colombia	Anthony Muse; United States	Adrian Villegas; Argentina

==== 3000 metres ====
Mass start

Games	Gold	Silver	Bronze
1979 San Juan	Raul Subiledt; Argentina	Curtis Cook; United States	Christopher Snyder; United States

==== 5000 metres ====
Games	Gold	Silver	Bronze
1987 Indianapolis	José Lozano; Argentina	Dante Muse; United States	Marcelo Losauro; Argentina
1991 Havana	Anthony Muse; United States	Dante Muse; United States	Orlando Valencia; Colombia

Mass start

Games	Gold	Silver	Bronze
1979 San Juan	Tom Peterson; United States	Adalberto Lugea; Argentina	Humberto Triana; Colombia

==== 10000 metres ====
Games	Gold	Silver	Bronze
1979 San Juan	Tom Peterson; United States	Christopher Snyder; United States	Jose Ramírez; Colombia
1987 Indianapolis	José Lozano; Argentina	César Hurtado; Colombia	Mike Müller; United States
1991 Havana	Francisco Fuentes; Chile	Dante Muse; United States	Guillermo McCargo; Argentina

Road

Games	Gold	Silver	Bronze
1995 Mar del Plata	Chad Hedrick; United States	Martín Alejo; Argentina	Jorge Botejo Naranjo; Colombia

Track

Games	Gold	Silver	Bronze
1995 Mar del Plata	Chad Hedrick; United States	Jorge Botejo Naranjo; Colombia	Martín Alejo; Argentina

Points + elimination

Games	Gold	Silver	Bronze
2011 Guadalajara	Jorge Bolaños; Ecuador	Ezequiel Capellano; Argentina	Jorge Reyes; Chile
2015 Toronto	Mike Paez; Mexico	Juan Sebastian Paz; Colombia	Jordan Belchos; Canada
2019 Lima	Álex Cujavante; Colombia	Hugo Ramírez; Chile	Jorge Bolaños; Ecuador
2023 Santiago	Andrés Gómez; Colombia	Juan Mantilla; Colombia	Hugo Ramírez; Chile

==== 10000 metres relay ====
Games	Gold	Silver	Bronze
1979 San Juan	United States	United States	Argentina
1987 Indianapolis	Argentina	United States	Costa Rica
1991 Havana	Colombia	Argentina	Chile
1995 Mar del Plata	United States	Colombia	Argentina

==== 20000 metres ====
Games	Gold	Silver	Bronze
1979 San Juan	Tom Peterson; United States	Christopher Snyder; United States	Raul Subiledt; Argentina
1987 Indianapolis	José Lozano; Argentina	César Hurtado; Colombia	Doug Glass; United States
1991 Havana	Dante Muse; United States	Guillermo Trinaroli; Argentina	Guillermo Mata; Costa Rica

Road

Games	Gold	Silver	Bronze
1995 Mar del Plata	Derek Parra; United States	Jorge Botejo Naranjo; Colombia	Chad Hedrick; United States

Track

Games	Gold	Silver	Bronze
1995 Mar del Plata	Chad Hedrick; United States	Jorge Botejo Naranjo; Colombia	Derek Parra; United States

==== Combined Short Distance ====
Games	Gold	Silver	Bronze
1999 Winnipeg	Diego Rosero; Colombia	Chad Hedrick; United States	Derek Downing; United States
2003 Santo Domingo	Joey Mantia; United States	José Guzmán; Chile	Fabricio Seguel; Argentina
2007 Rio de Janeiro	Joey Mantia; United States	Juan Jardines; Venezuela	Damian Fernandez; Argentina

==== Combined Long Distance ====
Games	Gold	Silver	Bronze
1999 Winnipeg	Chad Hedrick; United States	José Bustamante; Colombia	Derek Downing; United States
2003 Santo Domingo	Joey Mantia; United States	Fabricio Seguel; Argentina	Gustavo Naula; Ecuador
2007 Rio de Janeiro	Jorge Luis Cifuentes; Colombia	Javier Oyalvis; Venezuela	Jorge Bolanos; Ecuador

==== Marathon ====
Games	Gold	Silver	Bronze
1995 Mar del Plata	Derek Parra; United States	Chad Hedrick; United States	Guillermo Trinaroli; Argentina
1999 Winnipeg	Chad Hedrick; United States	Diego Rosero; Colombia	José Bustamante; Colombia

=== Women's ===
==== 200 metres ====
Time Trial

Games	Gold	Silver	Bronze
2015 Toronto	Hellen Montoya; Colombia	Ingrid Factos; Ecuador	María José Moya; Chile
2023 Santiago	Geiny Pájaro; Colombia	Ivonne Nóchez; El Salvador	Erin Jackson; United States

==== 300 metres ====
Time Trial

Games	Gold	Silver	Bronze
1987 Indianapolis	Beth Tucker; United States	Darlene Kessinger; United States	Patricia Cerezo; Argentina
1991 Havana	María Richardson; Argentina	Darlene Kessinger; United States	Claudia Ruiz; Colombia
1995 Mar del Plata	Nora Vega; Argentina	Gipsy Lucas; United States	Lina Zapata; Colombia
2011 Guadalajara	Yersy Puello; Colombia	Maria Moya; Chile	Veronica Elias; Mexico
2019 Lima	María Moya; Chile	Geiny Pájaro; Colombia	Dalia Soberanis; Guatemala

==== 500 metres ====
Games	Gold	Silver	Bronze
1979 San Juan	Nora Vega; Argentina	Linda Dorso; United States	Elaine Coley; United States
2015 Toronto	Hellen Montoya; Colombia	Erin Jackson; United States	Ingrid Factos; Ecuador
2019 Lima	Geiny Pájaro; Colombia	Dalia Soberanis; Guatemala	Verónica Elías; Mexico
2023 Santiago	Erin Jackson; United States	María Arias; Ecuador	Geiny Pájaro; Colombia

Pair elimination

Games	Gold	Silver	Bronze
1979 San Juan	Nora Vega; Argentina	Linda Dorso; United States	Claudia Rodríguez; Argentina

Road

Games	Gold	Silver	Bronze
1995 Mar del Plata	Lina Zapata; Colombia	Heather Laufer; United States	Gipsy Lucas; United States

Track

Games	Gold	Silver	Bronze
1995 Mar del Plata	Heather Laufer; United States	Gipsy Lucas; United States	Nora Vega; Argentina

==== 1000 metres ====
Games	Gold	Silver	Bronze
2011 Guadalajara	Yersy Puello; Colombia	Sandra Buelvas; Venezuela	Melisa Bonnet; Argentina
2023 Santiago	Gabriela Rueda; Colombia	Gabriela Vargas; Ecuador	Angy Quintero; Venezuela

==== 1500 metres ====
Games	Gold	Silver	Bronze
1987 Indianapolis	Nora Meledi; Argentina	Lori Feger; United States	Claudia Rodríguez; Argentina
1991 Havana	María Richardson; Argentina	Danielle Lewis; United States	Jenny Duarte; Colombia

Road

Games	Gold	Silver	Bronze
1995 Mar del Plata	Heather Laufer; United States	Andrea Gónzalez; Argentina	María Richardson; Argentina

Track

Games	Gold	Silver	Bronze
1995 Mar del Plata	Isabel Henao; Colombia	Rosana Sastre; Argentina	Cheryll Ezzell; United States

==== 2000 metres ====
Points

Games	Gold	Silver	Bronze
1995 Mar del Plata	Rosana Sastre; Argentina	Vicci King; United States	Isabel Henao; Colombia

==== 3000 metres ====
Games	Gold	Silver	Bronze
1987 Indianapolis	Darlene Kessinger; United States	Luz Tristán; Colombia	Beth Tucker; United States
1991 Havana	Rosana Sastre; Argentina	Claudia Ruiz; Colombia	Claudia Rodríguez; Argentina

Mass start

Games	Gold	Silver	Bronze
1979 San Juan	Nora Vega; Argentina	Claudia Rodríguez; Argentina	Linsue Peterson; United States

==== 5000 metres ====
Games	Gold	Silver	Bronze
1979 San Juan	Claudia Rodríguez; Argentina	Suzanne Dooley; United States	Sonia Freigeiro; Argentina
1987 Indianapolis	Luz Tristán; Colombia	Isabel Gutiérrez; Colombia	Deanna Parker; United States
1991 Havana	Claudia Rodríguez; Argentina	Rosana Sastre; Argentina	Deanna Parker; United States

Road

Games	Gold	Silver	Bronze
1995 Mar del Plata	Cheryll Ezzell; United States	Rosana Sastre; Argentina	Marcela Caceres; Chile

Track

Games	Gold	Silver	Bronze
1995 Mar del Plata	Gipsy Lucas; United States	Nora Vega; Argentina	Heather Laufer; United States

==== 5000 metres relay ====
Games	Gold	Silver	Bronze
1979 San Juan	Argentina	United States	United States
1987 Indianapolis	United States	Argentina	Colombia
1991 Havana	Argentina	Colombia	United States
1995 Mar del Plata	Argentina	Chile	Colombia

==== 10000 metres ====
Games	Gold	Silver	Bronze
1987 Indianapolis	Rosana Sastre; Argentina	Beth Tucker; United States	Brenda Nyll; Puerto Rico
1991 Havana	Rosana Sastre; Argentina	Claudia Rodríguez; Argentina	Deanna Parker; United States

Road

Games	Gold	Silver	Bronze
1995 Mar del Plata	Vicci King; United States	Rosana Sastre; Argentina	Marcela Caceres; Chile

Track

Games	Gold	Silver	Bronze
1995 Mar del Plata	Cheryll Ezzell; United States	Marcela Caceres; Chile	Natalia Martínez; Argentina

Points + elimination

Games	Gold	Silver	Bronze
2011 Guadalajara	Kelly Martínez; Colombia	Melisa Bonnet; Argentina	Catherine Peñán; Chile
2015 Toronto	Maira Arias; Argentina	Emma Clare Townshend; Ecuador	Darian O'Neil; United States
2019 Lima	Johana Viveros; Colombia	Javiera San Martín; Chile	Kelsey Helman; United States
2023 Santiago	Fabriana Arias; Colombia	Gabriela Rueda; Colombia	Gabriela Vargas; Ecuador

==== Combined Short Distance ====
Games	Gold	Silver	Bronze
1999 Winnipeg	Andrea González; Argentina	Berenice Moreno; Colombia	Erika Rueda; Colombia
2003 Santo Domingo	Andrea González; Argentina	Paula Verdugo; Chile	Julie Glass; United States
2007 Rio de Janeiro	Brittany Bowe; United States	Carolina Santibanez; Chile	Melisa Bonnet; Argentina

==== Combined Long Distance ====
Games	Gold	Silver	Bronze
1999 Winnipeg	Theresa Cliff; United States	Julie Brandt; United States	Andrea González; Argentina
2003 Santo Domingo	Julie Glass; United States	Andrea González; Argentina	Cecilia Baena; Colombia
2007 Rio de Janeiro	Jessica Smith; United States	Alexandra Vivas; Colombia	Silvina Posada; Argentina

==== Half Marathon ====
Games	Gold	Silver	Bronze
1995 Mar del Plata	Marcela Caceres; Chile	Rosana Sastre; Argentina	Cheryll Ezzell; United States
1999 Winnipeg	Andrea Haritchelhar; Argentina	Andrea González; Argentina	Erika Rueda; Colombia

== Roller hockey ==
=== Men's ===
Games	Gold	Silver	Bronze
1979 San Juan	Argentina	Brazil	Chile
1987 Indianapolis	Argentina	United States	Brazil
1991 Havana	Argentina	Brazil	United States
1995 Mar del Plata	Argentina	Brazil	Colombia
1999 Winnipeg	United States	Argentina	Brazil
2003 Santo Domingo	United States	Canada	Brazil

== Skateboarding ==
=== Men's ===
==== Park ====
Games	Gold	Silver	Bronze
2023 Santiago	Taylor Nye; United States	Augusto Akio; Brazil	Steven Piñeiro; Puerto Rico

==== Street ====
Games	Gold	Silver	Bronze
2023 Santiago	Lucas Rabelo; Brazil	Ángelo Caro; Peru	Jhancarlos González; Colombia

=== Women's ===
==== Park ====
Games	Gold	Silver	Bronze
2023 Santiago	Fay De Fazio Ebert; Canada	Raicca Ventura; Brazil	Bryce Wettstein; United States

==== Street ====
Games	Gold	Silver	Bronze
2023 Santiago	Rayssa Leal; Brazil	Pâmela Rosa; Brazil	Paige Heyn; United States
