= Roller sports at the Pan American Games =

- No. of events: 14 (men: 7; women: 7)

Roller sports have been contested at the Pan American Games since the 1979 edition.

== Events ==
Events	Editions																			Years
Events	Argentina	Mexico	USA	Brazil	Canada	Colombia	Mexico	Puerto Rico	Venezuela	USA	Cuba	Argentina	Canada	Dominican Republic	Brazil	Mexico	Canada	Peru	Chile	Years
Events	I	II	III	IV	V	VI	VII	VIII	IX	X	XI	XII	XIII	XIV	XV	XVI	XVII	XVIII	XIX	Years
Artistic roller skating
Men								X		X		X	X	X	X	X	X	X	X	10
Women								X		X		X	X	X	X	X	X	X	X	10
Mixed								X		X		X	X							4
Roller speed skating
Men								X		X	X	X	X	X	X	X	X	X	X	11
Women								X		X	X	X	X	X	X	X	X	X	X	11
Roller hockey
Men								X		X	X	X	X	X						6
Skateboarding
Men																			X	1
Women																			X	1

== All-time medal table ==
=== Artistic roller skating ===
Men's, women's and mixed events (1979–2023)
Rank	Nation	Gold	Silver	Bronze	Total
1	United States	18	17	3	38
2	Argentina	7	9	7	23
3	Brazil	6	2	7	15
4	Colombia	1	1	6	8
5	Canada	0	1	7	8
6	Chile	0	1	1	2
7	Uruguay	0	1	0	1
8	Ecuador	0	0	1	1
Totals (8 entries)		32	32	32	96

=== Roller speed skating ===
Men's and women's events (1979–2023)
Rank	Nation	Gold	Silver	Bronze	Total
1	United States	40	31	27	98
2	Colombia	27	23	17	67
3	Argentina	26	24	29	79
4	Chile	5	9	10	24
5	Ecuador	1	4	5	10
6	Mexico	1	3	5	9
7	Venezuela	0	4	2	6
8	Guatemala	0	1	1	2
9	El Salvador	0	1	0	1
10	Costa Rica	0	0	2	2
11	Canada	0	0	1	1
11	Puerto Rico	0	0	1	1
Totals (12 entries)		100	100	100	300

=== Roller hockey ===
Men's events (1979–2003)
Rank	Nation	Gold	Silver	Bronze	Total
1	Argentina	4	1	0	5
2	United States	2	1	1	4
3	Brazil	0	3	3	6
4	Canada	0	1	0	1
5	Chile	0	0	1	1
5	Colombia	0	0	1	1
Totals (6 entries)		6	6	6	18

=== Skateboarding ===
Men's and women's events (2023)
Rank	Nation	Gold	Silver	Bronze	Total
1	Brazil	2	3	0	5
2	United States	1	0	2	3
3	Canada	1	0	0	1
4	Peru	0	1	0	1
5	Colombia	0	0	1	1
5	Puerto Rico	0	0	1	1
Totals (6 entries)		4	4	4	12

=== Combined total ===
Last updated after the 2023 Pan American Games
Rank	Nation	Gold	Silver	Bronze	Total
1	United States	61	49	33	143
2	Argentina	37	34	36	107
3	Colombia	28	24	25	77
4	Brazil	8	8	10	26
5	Chile	5	10	12	27
6	Ecuador	1	4	6	11
7	Mexico	1	3	5	9
8	Canada	1	2	8	11
9	Venezuela	0	4	2	6
10	Guatemala	0	1	1	2
11	El Salvador	0	1	0	1
11	Peru	0	1	0	1
11	Uruguay	0	1	0	1
14	Costa Rica	0	0	2	2
14	Puerto Rico	0	0	2	2
Totals (15 entries)		142	142	142	426
