= Weightlifting at the 1992 Summer Olympics – Men's 67.5 kg =

Weightlifting at the Olympics

Men's 67.5 kg at the Games of the XXV Olympiad
- Venue: Pavelló de l'Espanya Industrial
- Date: 29 July 1992
- Competitors: 18 from 16 nations
- Winning total: 337.5 kg

Medalists
1st place, gold medalist(s)		Israel Militosyan	Unified Team
2nd place, silver medalist(s)		Yoto Yotov	Bulgaria
3rd place, bronze medalist(s)		Andreas Behm	Germany

The Men's Lightweight Weightlifting Event (– 67.5 kg) is the fourth-lightest men's event at the Olympic weightlifting competition, limiting competitors to a maximum of 67.5 kilograms of body mass. The competition took place on 29 July 1992 in the Pavelló de l'Espanya Industrial.

Each lifter performed in both the snatch and clean and jerk lifts, with the final score being the sum of the lifter's best result in each. The athlete received three attempts in each of the two lifts; the score for the lift was the heaviest weight successfully lifted. Ties were broken by the lifter with the lightest body weight.

== Results ==
Rank	Name	Body Weight	Snatch (kg)			Clean & Jerk (kg)			Total (kg)
Rank	Name	Body Weight	1	2	3	1	2	3	Total (kg)
1st place, gold medalist(s)	Israel Militosyan (EUN)	67.25	152.5	155.0 =OR	~~157.5~~	177.5	182.5	~~187.5~~	337.5
2nd place, silver medalist(s)	Yoto Yotov (BUL)	67.05	145.0	150.0	~~152.5~~	~~177.5~~	177.5	~~182.5~~	327.5
3rd place, bronze medalist(s)	Andreas Behm (GER)	67.25	135.0	140.0	145.0	175.0	~~185.0~~	~~185.0~~	320.0
4	Abdel Manaane Yahiaoui (ALG)	67.50	135.0	140.0	~~142.5~~	170.0	~~175.0~~	175.0	315.0
5	Jouni Grönman (FIN)	67.40	~~135.0~~	135.0	~~140.0~~	165.0	170.0	~~172.5~~	305.0
6	Eyne Acevedo (COL)	66.75	125.0	~~130.0~~	130.0	165.0	170.0	~~175.0~~	300.0
7	Im Sang-ho (PRK)	67.25	135.0	-	-	165.0	-	-	300.0
8	Tim McRae (USA)	67.25	127.5	132.5	135.0	157.5	162.5	~~165.0~~	297.5
9	Noriaki Horikoshi (JPN)	67.30	125.0	130.0	~~132.5~~	160.0	165.0	~~170.0~~	295.0
10	Vernon Patao (USA)	66.65	127.5	132.5	~~135.0~~	157.5	~~162.5~~	~~162.5~~	290.0
11	Fatmir Bushi (ALB)	67.10	~~130.0~~	130.0	~~132.5~~	160.0	~~165.0~~	~~167.5~~	290.0
12	Attila Feri (ROU)	67.20	125.0	130.0	~~132.5~~	160.0	~~170.0~~	-	290.0
13	Sokol Bishanaku (ALB)	67.15	125.0	~~127.5~~	~~130.0~~	155.0	157.5	~~160.0~~	282.5
14	José Alexander Medina (VEN)	67.05	~~120.0~~	120.0	~~125.0~~	160.0	~~165.0~~	~~165.0~~	280.0
15	Mohamed Meziane (MAR)	67.15	~~115.0~~	115.0	~~125.0~~	145.0	150.0	~~155.0~~	265.0
16	Wang Yong (CHN)	67.05	140.0	~~140.0~~	~~140.0~~	~~177.5~~	~~177.5~~	~~177.5~~	DNF
17	Fernando Mariaca (ESP)	67.20	~~125.0~~	~~125.0~~	~~130.0~~	-	-	-	DNF
18	Kazem Panjavi (IRI)	67.25	~~125.0~~	~~125.0~~	~~125.0~~	-	-	-	DNF
