= Chile at the 1991 Pan American Games =

- IOC code: CHI
- NOC: Comité Olímpico de Chile

in Havana 8–18 August 1991
- Medals Ranked 10th: Gold 2 Silver 1 Bronze 7 Total 10

Pan American Games appearances (overview)
- 1951; 1955; 1959; 1963; 1967; 1971; 1975; 1979; 1983; 1987; 1991; 1995; 1999; 2003; 2007; 2011; 2015; 2019; 2023

Chile competed in the 11th Pan American Games which were held in Havana, Cuba from August 2 to August 18, 1991.

== Medalists ==
Medal	Name	Sport	Event
Gold	Gert Weil	Athletics	Men's Shot put
Gold	Francisco Fuentes	Roller sports	10 Km
Silver	Ricardo Araneda	Boxing	Men's 75 kg
Silver	Marcelo Arrué	Cycling	1000m Sprint
Silver	Marcela Caceres; Carola Varela	Roller sports	Women's 5000m relay
Silver	Marcela Caceres	Roller sports	Women's 10000m
Silver	Sofija Tepes; Jacqueline Diaz	Table tennis	Women's Doubles
Bronze	Paula Cabezas; Bárbara Castro	Tennis	Women's Doubles
Bronze	Sebastián Keitel	Athletics	Men's 200m
Bronze	Gert Weil	Athletics	Men's shot put

== See also ==
- Chile at the Pan American Games
- Chile at the 1992 Summer Olympics
