= Derrick Crass =

American weightlifter (born 1960)

Derrick Crass (born August 6, 1960) was an Olympic weightlifter for the United States. In his early years he lifted under Coach and Mentor Ted Frank at the Belleville Weightlifting Club (IL) who laid the foundation for all future lifting achievements. In his early twenties he was selected to train at the Colorado Springs Training Facility and from then on was coached by Harvey Newton and Jim Schmitz. In 1996, he appeared on the cover of a CD, entitled Amazing Disgrace, by the rock band The Posies. The image was taken from the 1984 Olympic Games in Los Angeles, CA, USA.

== Weightlifting achievements ==
- Olympic team member (1984 and 1988)
- Pan American Games team member (1987)
- Senior World Championship team member (1982 and 1989)
- Junior World Championships team member (1980)
- Gold Medalist in Oceania Championships (1984)
- Bronze Medalist in Pannonia Cup (1982)
- Silver Medalist in Manuel Suarez Cup (1987)
- Bronze Medalist in Moomba Cup (1990)
- Senior National Champion (1987, 1989, and 1990)
- Best Lifter at Senior National Championships (1989)

== Notes of interest ==
With his daughter, Rachel, they became the second father and daughter to compete together at a USA Senior National Championship (2002). To date, they are the only known father and daughter pair in the world to compete at the Junior World Championships and Senior World Championships. In 2010 Derrick Crass invented DC Blocks, which are stacked to assist in exercises, primarily weightlifting. Derrick currently resides in Ormond Beach, Florida.

In 2013, Derrick graduated from Saint Louis University as a Physician Assistant and later retired. He currently has an internet business to sell and promote his invention: DC Blocks. DC Blocks' products are a "versatile, lightweight, stackable, interlocking, and virtually indestructible system" (DC Blocks) used to raise the barbell from the floor to perform various weightlifting exercises, as well as being a piece of equipment while performing other exercises.
