= Argentina at the 1991 Pan American Games =

- IOC code: ARG
- NOC: Comité Olímpico Argentino

in Havana 8–18 August 1991
- Flag bearer: Claudia Rodríguez
- Medals Ranked 6th: Gold 11 Silver 15 Bronze 29 Total 55

Pan American Games appearances (overview)
- 1951; 1955; 1959; 1963; 1967; 1971; 1975; 1979; 1983; 1987; 1991; 1995; 1999; 2003; 2007; 2011; 2015; 2019; 2023

The 13th Pan American Games were held in Havana, Cuba from August 2 to August 18, 1991.

== Medals ==
=== Gold ===
===== Cycling =====
- Men's 4.000m Points Race (Track): Erminio Suárez

===== Judo =====
- Men's Featherweight (– 65 kg): Francisco Morales

===== Field hockey =====
- Men's Team Competition: Diego Allona, Alejandro Doherty, Fernando Ferrara, Marcelo Garraffo, Carlos Geneyro, Pablo Lombi, Adrián Mandarano, Gabriel Minadeo, Pablo Moreira, Edgardo Pailos, Rodolfo Pérez, Carlos Retegui, Emanuel Roggero, Daniel Ruiz, Alejandro Siri, and Martín Sordelli
- Women's Team Competition: Valeria Almada, Verónica Artica, Marcela Budnik, Victoria Carbó, María Castelli, María Paz Ferrari, Anabel Gambero, Gabriela Liz, Marisa López, Sofía MacKenzie, Karina Masotta, Laura Mulhall, Vanina Oneto, María Gabriela Pazos, Marcela Richezza, and Jorgelina Rimoldi

===== Roller skating =====
- Men's Team Competition: Diego Allende, Alfredo Bridge, Gabriel Cairo, Osvaldo Gonella, Pablo Cairo, Guillermo Herrmann, Jorge Luz, José Posito, and Roberto Roldán
- Women's 300 metres: María Eva Richardson
- Women's 1500 metres: María Eva Richardson
- Women's 3000 metres: Rosana Sastre
- Women's 10,000 metres: Rosana Sastre
- Women's 5000 metres: Claudia Rodríguez
- Women's Team Relay 5000 m: Claudia Rodríguez, Rosana Sastre, and María Eva Richardson

=== Silver ===
===== Judo =====
- Men's Heavyweight (+ 95 kg): Orlando Baccino
- Women's Middleweight (– 66 kg): Laura Martinel

===== Canoeing =====
- Men's K2 1.000 metres: Mauricio Vergauven and José Luis Marello

===== Fencing =====
- Women's Foil: Sandra Giancola

===== Roller skating =====
- Men's 1500 metres: Guillermo Herrero
- Men's 20 kilometres: Guillermo Trinaroli
- Men's Team Relay 10 km: Guillermo McCargo, Guillermo Herrero, and Guillermo Trinaroli
- Women's 5000 metres: Rosana Sastre
- Women's 10,000 metres: Claudia Rodríguez

===== Rowing =====
- Men's Single Sculls: Sergio Fernández
- Men's Coxed Pairs: Marcelo Pieretti, Gustavo Pacheco, and Andrés Seperizza
- Men's Lightweight Double Sculls: Federico Querin and Jorge Lammo

===== Shooting =====
- Men's 25 m Standard Pistol Teams: Oscar Yuston, Jorge Almirón, and Daniel Felizia

===== Sailing =====
- Men's Lechner A390: Carlos Espínola

===== Wrestling =====
- Men's Freestyle (– 68 kg): Daniel Navarrete

=== Bronze ===
===== Athletics =====
- Men's 5,000 metres: Antonio Silio

===== Boxing =====
- Men's Super Heavyweight (+ 91 kg): Elio Ibarra

===== Cycling =====
- Men's 1.000m Time Trial (Track): Germán García
- Men's 4.000m Team Pursuit (Track): Argentina

===== Judo =====
- Men's Light Middleweight (– 78 kg): Dario García
- Men's Light Heavyweight (– 95 kg): Jorge Aguirre
- Men's Open Class: Orlando Baccino
- Women's Half Lightweight (– 52 kg): Carolina Mariani

===== Gymnastics =====
- Women's All-Around: Romina Plataroti

===== Sailing =====
- Women's Lechner A390: María Espínola
- Men's Laser: José Campero

===== Volleyball =====
- Men's Team Competition: Argentina men's national volleyball team

== Results by event ==
=== Basketball ===
==== Men's team competition ====
- Preliminary Round (Group A)
  - Lost to Bahamas (96-104)
  - Lost to United States (81-87)
  - Defeated Cuba (77-72)
  - Defeated Venezuela (100-85)
- Quarterfinals
  - Lost to Mexico (77-91)
- Classification Matches
  - 5th/8th place: Lost to Brazil (64-95)
  - 7th/8th place: Defeated Uruguay (71-63) → Seventh place
- Team Roster

==== Women's team competition ====
- Preliminary Round Robin
  - Lost to Cuba (47-93)
  - Lost to United States (40-97)
  - Lost to Canada (61-81)
  - Lost to Brazil (56-83) → Fifth place
- Team Roster

=== Volleyball ===
==== Men's team competition ====
- Preliminary Round
  - Lost to Brazil (1-3)
  - Defeated Puerto Rico (3-0)
  - Lost to Cuba (0-3)
  - Defeated Canada (3-1)
  - Lost to United States (2-3)
- Semifinals
  - Lost to Cuba (0-3)
- Bronze Medal Match
  - Defeated United States (3-1) → Bronze Medal
- Team Roster

== See also ==
- Argentina at the 1992 Summer Olympics
