= William Vargas =

Cuban weightlifter (born 1970)

Personal information
- Born: September 17, 1970 (age 56)
- Height: 157 cm (5 ft 2 in)
Medal record
Men's Weightlifting
Representing Cuba
Pan American Games
Gold medal – first place	1991 Havana	Bantamweight
Gold medal – first place	1995 Mar del Plata	Bantamweight
Gold medal – first place	1999 Winnipeg	Featherweight
World Championships
Bronze medal – third place	2001 Antalya	Bantamweight

William Vargas Trujillo (born September 17, 1970, in Havana) is a retired male weightlifter from Cuba. He competed for his native country at the 1996 Summer Olympics, and thrice won a gold medal at the Pan American Games: in 1991, 1995 and 1999.
