= Colombia at the 1991 Pan American Games =

- IOC code: COL
- NOC: Colombian Olympic Committee
- Website: www.olimpicocol.co (in Spanish)

in Havana 8–18 August 1991
- Medals Ranked 7th: Gold 5 Silver 15 Bronze 21 Total 41

Pan American Games appearances (overview)
- 1951; 1955; 1959; 1963; 1967; 1971; 1975; 1979; 1983; 1987; 1991; 1995; 1999; 2003; 2007; 2011; 2015; 2019; 2023

The 11th Pan American Games were held in Havana, Cuba from August 2 to August 18, 1991.

== Medals ==
=== Gold ===
===== Athletics =====
- Men's 20 km Walk: Héctor Moreno

===== Cycling =====
- Men's Team Time Trial (Road): Ruber Marín, Juan de Dios Fajardo, Héctor Palacio, and Asdrúbal Patiño

===== Roller Skating =====
- Men's 1500 m: Guillermo Botero
- Men's Team 10,000 m: Guillermo Botero, Orlando Valencia, and Sergio Pino

===== Shooting =====
- Men's Pistol: Bernardo Tovar

=== Silver ===
===== Athletics =====
- Women's 200 metres: Ximena Restrepo
- Women's 400 metres: Ximena Restrepo

===== Cycling =====
- Men's 4.000m Points Race (Track): Jairo Giraldo

===== Weightlifting =====
- Men's Lightweight (– 67.5 kg): Eyne Acevedo
- Men's Middleweight (– 75 kg): Álvaro Velasco

===== Wrestling =====
- Men's Greco-Roman (– 57 kg): Víctor Capacho

=== Bronze ===
===== Athletics =====
- Men's Javelin: Luis Lucumí

===== Boxing =====
- Men's Light Flyweight (– 48 kg): Fernando Retayud

===== Cycling =====
- Men's 1.000m Match Sprint (Track): Jhon González

===== Weightlifting =====
- Men's Bantamweight (– 56 kg): Carlos David
- Men's Featherweight (– 60 kg): John Salazar
- Men's Heavyweight (– 110 kg): Humberto Gómez

== See also ==
- Colombia at the 1992 Summer Olympics
