= Gustavo Majauskas =

Argentine weightlifter (born 1966)

Personal information
- Nationality: Argentine
- Born: 12 January 1966 (age 60)

Sport
- Sport: Weightlifting
Medal record
Representing Argentina
Pan American Games
Silver medal – second place	1995 Mar del Plata	-64kg clean and jerk
Silver medal – second place	1995 Mar del Plata	-64kg snatch
Silver medal – second place	1995 Mar del Plata	-64kg total
Bronze medal – third place	1991 Havana	-60kg clean and jerk
South American Games
Gold medal – first place	1990 Lima	-60kg clean & jerk
Gold medal – first place	1990 Lima	-60kg snatch
Gold medal – first place	1990 Lima	-60kg total
Silver medal – second place	1986 Santiago	-60kg snatch
Silver medal – second place	1986 Santiago	-60kg total
Bronze medal – third place	1986 Santiago	-60kg clean & jerk

Gustavo A. Majauskas Manfredi (born 12 January 1966) is an Argentine weightlifter. He competed at the 1992 Summer Olympics and the 1996 Summer Olympics.
