= Chile at the 1995 Pan American Games =

- IOC code: CHI
- NOC: Comité Olímpico de Chile

in Mar del Plata 11–26 March 1995
- Medals Ranked 9th: Gold 2 Silver 6 Bronze 10 Total 18

Pan American Games appearances (overview)
- 1951; 1955; 1959; 1963; 1967; 1971; 1975; 1979; 1983; 1987; 1991; 1995; 1999; 2003; 2007; 2011; 2015; 2019; 2023; 2027

The 12th Pan American Games were held in Mar del Plata, Argentina from March 11 to March 26, 1995.

== Medalists ==
Medal	Name	Sport	Event
Gold	Marcela Caceres	Roller sports	Half marathon
Gold	Alberto González; Germán Schacht; Cristián Herman	Sailing	Class Lightning
Silver	Ricardo Araneda	Boxing	Men's 75 kg
Silver	Marcelo Arrué	Cycling	1000m sprint
Silver	Marcela Caceres; Carola Varela	Roller sports	Women's 5000m relay
Silver	Marcela Caceres	Roller sports	Women's 10000m
Silver	Sofija Tepes; Jacqueline Díaz	Table tennis	Women's doubles
Silver	Paula Cábezas; Bárbara Castro	Tennis	Women's doubles
Bronze	Sebastián Keitel	Athletics	Men's 200m
Bronze	Gert Weil	Athletics	Men's shot put
Bronze	Fernando Fernando García; José Córdoba	Basque pelota	Men's Trinquete goma
Bronze	Paris Inostroza	Fencing	Men's épée
Bronze	Marcela Caceres	Roller sports	Women's 5000m road
Bronze	Marcela Caceres	Roller sports	Women's 10000m road
Bronze	Berta Rodríguez; Úrsula Macaya	Table tennis	Women's doubles
Bronze	Juan Papic; Juan Salamancs	Table tennis	Men's doubles
Bronze	Sergio Curdena	Taekwondo	Men's 70 kg
Bronze	Sergio Cortés; Gabriel Silberstein	Tennis	Men's doubles
Bronze	Sergio Cortés; Gabriel Silberstein	Tennis	Men's team

== See also ==
- Chile at the Pan American Games
- Chile at the 1996 Summer Olympics
