= Mario Martinez (weightlifter) =

American weightlifter (1957–2018)

Personal information
- Born: July 6, 1957 Soledad, California, United States
- Died: January 14, 2018 (aged 60) Dublin, California, United States

Sport
- Sport: Weightlifting
Medal record
Representing United States
Olympic Games
Silver medal – second place	1984 Los Angeles	Super-heavyweight
Pan American Games
Gold medal – first place	1987 Indianapolis	+110kg clean & jerk
Gold medal – first place	1987 Indianapolis	+110kg snatch
Gold medal – first place	1987 Indianapolis	+110kg total
Gold medal – first place	1991 Havana	+110kg clean & jerk
Gold medal – first place	1991 Havana	+110kg snatch
Gold medal – first place	1991 Havana	+110kg total
Gold medal – first place	1995 Mar del Plata	+108kg clean & jerk
Gold medal – first place	1995 Mar del Plata	+108kg snatch
Gold medal – first place	1995 Mar del Plata	+108kg total

Mario Alvarez Martinez (July 6, 1957 – January 14, 2018) was an Olympic weightlifter for the United States. His coach was Jim Schmitz.

== Early life ==
Martinez was born and raised on a ranch in Soledad, California. At a young age, Martinez strength trained under a tree with a non-revolving exercise bar and weights. He tied some of these weights on the bar with just a rope so that they would stay on while he would lift. Martinez was so strong that he eventually began bending all of his bars because of all the weight he load on. He would then take a hammer and bend the bars back into place to straighten them and continue on with his training.

== Career ==
Martinez's lifting career in Olympic weightlifting lasted for over 23 years. Throughout his career, he earned himself 10 national championships, 3 Olympics including a silver medal and a 4th-place finish, 3 Pan Am medals, on top of being the first American to snatch over 400 lb and clean & jerk over 500 lb in competition. Martinez had very rough training techniques. He was well known for his bent-arm pulling style. When he would rack his cleans, only his finger tips would be on the bar and he had to regrip for the jerk. When his hands were to slip off, he would have to grab the bar again.

== Weightlifting achievements ==
- Silver Medalist in Olympic Games (1984)
- Olympic Games team member (1984, 1988, and 1992)
- Silver Medalist in Senior World Championships (1984)
- Pan Am Games Champion (1987)
- Silver Medalist in Pan Am Games (1991)
- Bronze Medalist in Pan Am Games (1995)
- Senior National Champion (1982-1989, 1992, and 1992)
- Senior American record holder in snatch, clean and jerk, and total (1972-1992)

== Death ==
Martinez died from complications due to diabetes on January 14, 2018. He had his lower left leg amputated a few years earlier.
