= Colombia at the 1995 Pan American Games =

- IOC code: COL
- NOC: Colombian Olympic Committee
- Website: www.olimpicocol.co (in Spanish)

in Mar del Plata 11–26 March 1995
- Medals Ranked 8th: Gold 5 Silver 15 Bronze 28 Total 48

Pan American Games appearances (overview)
- 1951; 1955; 1959; 1963; 1967; 1971; 1975; 1979; 1983; 1987; 1991; 1995; 1999; 2003; 2007; 2011; 2015; 2019; 2023; 2027

The 12th Pan American Games were held in Mar del Plata from March 11 to March 26, 1995.

== Medals ==
=== Silver ===
===== Weightlifting =====
- Men's Flyweight (– 54 kg): Juan Fernández
- Men's Lightweight (– 70 kg): Eine Acevedo
- Men's Middleweight (– 76 kg): Álvaro Velasco

=== Bronze ===
===== Athletics =====
- Men's 400 m Hurdles: Llimy Rivas
- Men's High Jump: Gilmar Mayo
- Women's 4×100 metres: Felipa Palacios, Mirtha Brock, Carmen Rodríguez, and Elia Mera
- Women's 4×400 metres: Carmen Rodríguez, Elia Mera, Mirtha Brock, and Felipa Palacios

===== Boxing =====
- Men's Lightweight (– 60 kg): Francisco Osorio
- Men's Middleweight (– 75 kg): Jhon Arroyo

===== Weightlifting =====
- Men's Bantamweight (– 59 kg): Roger Berrio
- Men's Light-Heavyweight (– 83 kg): Erlyn Mena

== See also ==
- Colombia at the 1996 Summer Olympics
