= Tom Gough =

American weightlifter (born 1972)

Personal information
- Born: February 20, 1972 (age 54) Fairfax, California, United States

Sport
- Sport: Weightlifting
Medal record
Representing United States
Pan American Games
Bronze medal – third place	1995 Mar del Plata	Middle-heavyweight

Thomas William "Tom" Gough (born February 20, 1972) is a former Olympic weightlifter for the United States. His coaches were Steve Gough and Dragomir Cioroslan.

== Weightlifting achievements ==
- Olympic Games team member (1996 & 2000)
- Bronze Medalist at Pan American Games (1995)
- Senior National Champion (1995-1998, 2000)
- Three-time Junior World Team Member
- Twice Junior National Champion
- All-Time Senior American record holder in total
- Senior American record holder in snatch, clean and jerk, and total (1993-1997)
