= Noriaki =

- Gender: Male

Origin
- Origin: Japanese
- Meaning: Different meanings depending on the kanji used

Noriaki (written: 紀明, 紀章, 紀昭, 紀彰, 鑑昭, 典昭, 典明, 憲明, 矩明, 伯明 or 功光) is a masculine Japanese given name. Notable people with the name include:

- Noriaki Fujimoto (藤本 憲明; born 1989), Japanese footballer
- Noriaki Fukuyama (福山 伯明; 1912–1946), Japanese botanist
- Noriaki Horikoshi (堀越 典昭; born 1972), Japanese weightlifter
- Noriaki Inoue (井上 鑑昭; 1902–1994), Japanese aikidoka
- Noriaki Ishizawa (石澤 典明; born 1985), Japanese footballer
- Noriaki Kano (狩野 紀昭; born 1940), Japanese educator
- Noriaki Kasai (葛西 紀明; born 1972), Japanese ski jumper
- Noriaki Kinoshita (木下 典明; born 1982), Japanese player of American football
- Noriaki Kumagai (born 1970), Japanese drummer
- Noriaki Okabe (岡部 憲明; born 1947), Japanese architect
- Noriaki Sanenobu (実信 憲明; born 1980), Japanese footballer
- Noriaki Sugiyama (杉山 紀彰; born 1974), Japanese voice actor and narrator
- Noriaki Tsuchimoto (土本 典昭; 1928–2008), Japanese film director
- Noriaki Tsutsui (筒井 紀章; born 1976), Japanese footballer
- Noriaki Yasuda (安田 矩明; born 1935), Japanese pole vaulter
- Noriaki Yokosuka (横須賀 功光; 1937–2003), Japanese photographer
- Noriaki Yuasa (湯浅 憲明; 1933–2004), Japanese film director

== Fictional characters ==
- Noriaki Kakyoin (花京院 典明), a character in the manga series JoJo's Bizarre Adventure
