= Álvaro Velasco =

Álvaro Velasco may refer to:

- Álvaro Velasco (weightlifter) (born 1971), Colombian weightlifter
- Álvaro Velasco (golfer) (born 1981), Spanish professional golfer
