= Wes Barnett =

American weightlifter (born 1970)

Personal information
- Full name: Wesley T. Barnett
- Born: April 1, 1970 (age 56) Saint Joseph, Missouri, U.S.
- Height: 6 ft 1 in (1.85 m)

Sport
- Country: United States
- Sport: Weightlifting
- Weight class: 100+ kg, 108+kg
- Coached by: Dennis Snethen

Achievements and titles
- Olympic finals: 6th
Medal record
Pan American Games
Gold medal – first place	1995 Mar del Plata	Heavyweight
Silver medal – second place	1991 Havana	Heavyweight
Bronze medal – third place	1999 Winnipeg	Heavyweight

Wesley T. Barnett (born April 1, 1970) is an American Olympic weightlifter. He competed for the United States at the 1992 Summer Olympics in Barcelona and at the 1996 Summer Olympics in Atlanta. Barnett is USA Weightlifting junior, collegiate, and senior national champion, and earned silver and bronze medals in 1997 at the World Championships in Chiang Mai, Thailand.

== Early life and training ==
Barnett was born and raised in Saint Joseph, Missouri. He competed at his first local competition in 1984 at a youth center in South St. Joseph, Missouri after being invited by Dennis Snethen who would become his coach. Later in the same year, he qualified for the AAU National Junior Olympics.

== Achievements ==
- 1989, 1990 was member of the Johnson County Community College Collegiate National Championship team;
- 1990 National Collegiate Champion in 90 kg weight class;
- 1990 National Junior Champion in 90 kg weight class;
- Olympic team member (1992 and 1996)
- Bronze medalist In Senior World Championships (1997)
- Pan Am Games Champion (1995)
- Silver medalist In Pan Am Games (1991)
- Bronze medalist in Pan Am Games (1999)
- Senior American record holder in clean and jerk and total (1993–1997)

== Legacy ==
After retiring as executive director of USA Weightlifting, USA Weightlifting used Wes's image in the creation of their logo, and the Olympic Training Center in Colorado erected a statue of Wes.
