= Darío Lecman =

Argentine weightlifter (born 1971)

Personal information
- Full name: Darío Lionel Lecman
- Born: 1 September 1971 (age 54) Buenos Aires, Argentina
Medal record
Men's weightlifting
Representing Argentina
Pan American Games
Silver medal – second place	1995 Mar del Plata	– 91 kg
Silver medal – second place	1999 Winnipeg	– 94 kg
Silver medal – second place	2003 Santo Domingo	– 94 kg

Darío Lionel Lecman (born 1 September 1971, in Buenos Aires) is a retired male weightlifter from Argentina. He twice competed for his native country at the Summer Olympics: 2000 and 2004. Lecman won three silver medals in a row at the Pan American Games: 1995, 1999 and 2003. He is Jewish.

After his retirement from professional weightlifting (precipitated by an International Weightlifting Federation ban lasting until 2008), Lecman worked as a personal fitness trainer for the Argentinian tennis player Mariano Puerta.

In 2020, following a period of stroke recovery, Lecman publicly denied Puerta's claims of his involvement in the latter's highly publicised 2005 doping scandal.
