= Idalberto Aranda =

Cuban weightlifter (born 1975)

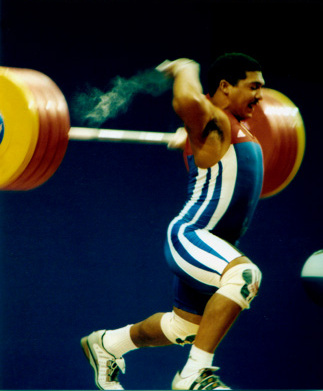
- Title weightlifting
Medal record
Men's Weightlifting
Representing Cuba
Pan American Games
Gold medal – first place	1995 Mar del Plata	Featherweight
Gold medal – first place	1999 Winnipeg	Middleweight

Idalberto Aranda Quintero (born May 29, 1975 in Santiago de Cuba) is a retired male weightlifter from Cuba. He twice competed for his native country at the Summer Olympics (1996 and 2000), and twice won a gold medal at the Pan American Games (1995 and 1999). He set one middleweight clean and jerk world record in 1999.

== Records ==
Records
Preceded by World standard	Men's 77 kg World Record Holder (C&J); 5 August 1999 – 2 September 1999	Succeeded by (China) Zhan Xugang
