= Emilio Lara =

Emilio Lara may refer to:

- Emilio Lara (weightlifter)
- Emilio Lara (footballer)
