= Gabriel Lemme =

Argentine weightlifter

Personal information
- Nationality: Argentine
- Born: 13 June 1970 (age 56)

Sport
- Sport: Weightlifting
Medal record
Representing Argentina
Pan American Games
Bronze medal – third place	1995 Mar del Plata	-70kg snatch

Gabriel Lemme (born 13 June 1970) is an Argentine weightlifter. He competed in the men's lightweight event at the 1996 Summer Olympics.
