= Weightlifting at the 1999 Pan American Games =

This page shows the results of the Weightlifting Competition at the 1999 Pan American Games, held from July 23 to August 8, 1999, in Winnipeg, Manitoba, Canada. There were a total number of fifteen medal events, eight for men and seven for women.

== Men's competition ==
=== Flyweight (– 56 kg) ===
Rank	Name	Bodyweight	Snatch	Clean & jerk	Total (kg)
1st place, gold medalist(s)	Sergio Álvarez Boulet (CUB)	55.96	115.0	150.0	265.0
2nd place, silver medalist(s)	Nelson Castro Velásquez (COL)	55.73	112.5	142.5	255.0
3rd place, bronze medalist(s)	Juan Fernández (COL)	55.94	110.0	142.5	252.5
4	Luis Medrano (GUA)	55.71	115.0	135.0	250.0
5	Franklin Liquinchana (ECU)	55.92	105.0	142.5	247.5
6	Alexis Nahuelquen (CHI)	55.77	110.0	135.0	245.0
7	Wilfredo García (ESA)	55.58	100.0	120.0	220.0
8	Manuel Romo (MEX)	54.25	90.0	120.0	210.0

=== Featherweight (– 62 kg) ===
Rank	Name	Bodyweight	Snatch	Clean & jerk	Total (kg)
1st place, gold medalist(s)	Roger Berrío (COL)	58.19	130.0	155.0	285.0
2nd place, silver medalist(s)	Marvin Jimenez (GUA)	61.94	127.5	150.0	277.5
3rd place, bronze medalist(s)	Legrand Sakamaki (GUA)	60.94	117.5	152.5	270.0
4	Amilcar Pernía (VEN)	61.55	115.0	145.0	260.0
–	Marco Culcay (ECU)	61.43	110.0	–	0

=== Lightweight (– 69 kg) ===
Rank	Name	Bodyweight	Snatch	Clean & jerk	Total (kg)
1st place, gold medalist(s)	Jonny González (COL)	68.27	137.5	177.5	315.0
2nd place, silver medalist(s)	Heriberto Barbosa (COL)	68.63	140.0	175.0	315.0
3rd place, bronze medalist(s)	Alexis Batista (PAN)	67.80	137.5	175.0	312.5
4	Sébastien Groulx (CAN)	68.00	130.0	162.5	292.5
5	Henry Blanco (VEN)	68.63	125.0	165.0	290.0
6	Jesús Caceres (ESA)	68.74	127.5	160.0	287.5
7	René Vallejo (ECU)	68.18	127.5	152.5	280.0
8	Adeilson Santos (BRA)	68.81	110.0	132.5	242.5

=== Middleweight (– 77 kg) ===
Rank	Name	Bodyweight	Snatch	Clean & jerk	Total (kg)
1st place, gold medalist(s)	Idalberto Aranda (CUB)	76.55	150.0	205.5 WR	355.0
2nd place, silver medalist(s)	Walter Llerena (ECU)	76.78	150.0	182.5	332.5
3rd place, bronze medalist(s)	Oscar Chaplin III (USA)	76.95	150.0	182.5	332.5
4	Carlos Sauri (PUR)	76.91	140.0	165.0	305.0
5	Marcelo Gandolfo (ARG)	76.25	130.0	170.0	300.0
6	Guy Hamilton (CAN)	76.86	132.5	167.5	300.0
7	Edward Silva (URU)	76.22	122.5	145.0	267.5
–	Luis Urriche (CHI)	76.18	127.5	~~152.5~~	–

=== Light-heavyweight (– 85 kg) ===
Rank	Name	Bodyweight	Snatch	Clean & jerk	Total (kg)
1st place, gold medalist(s)	Álvaro Velasco (COL)	83.92	162.5	190.0	352.5
2nd place, silver medalist(s)	José Llerena (ECU)	83.07	147.5	192.5	340.0
3rd place, bronze medalist(s)	Tim McRae (USA)	83.23	155.0	185.0	340.0
4	Corey Barrett (USA)	84.72	145.0	182.5	327.5
5	Henrry Coy (GUA)	83.29	132.5	170.0	302.5
6	Reynaldo Vélez (PUR)	84.93	130.0	170.0	300.0
7	Sergio Lafuente (URU)	84.17	120.0	160.0	280.0
8	Isnardo Faro (ARU)	84.68	120.0	155.0	275.0
–	Joël McKenzie (CUB)	84.55	155.0	–	0
–	José Barros (ARG)	84.06	140.0	–	0

=== Middle-heavyweight (– 94 kg) ===
Rank	Name	Bodyweight	Snatch	Clean & jerk	Total (kg)
1st place, gold medalist(s)	Carlos Hernández (CUB)	92.14	175.0	207.5	382.5
2nd place, silver medalist(s)	Darío Lecman (ARG)	92.92	175.0	205.0	380.0
3rd place, bronze medalist(s)	Julio César Luña (VEN)	93.62	165.0	195.0	360.0
4	Peter Kelley (USA)	93.86	150.0	180.0	330.0
5	Javier Otoya (ECU)	89.64	140.0	180.0	320.0
6	Carlos Holguín (DOM)	93.13	140.0	170.0	310.0

=== Heavyweight (– 105 kg) ===
Rank	Name	Bodyweight	Snatch	Clean & jerk	Total (kg)
1st place, gold medalist(s)	Boris Burov (ECU)	101.52	182.5	215.0	397.5
2nd place, silver medalist(s)	Michel Batista (CUB)	94.86	177.5	210.0	387.5
3rd place, bronze medalist(s)	Wes Barnett (USA)	104.91	170.0	210.0	380.0
4	Akos Sandor (CAN)	104.32	167.5	195.0	362.5
5	Joel Lackey (USA)	104.70	157.5	185.0	342.5
6	Edmilson Dantas (BRA)	104.71	155.0	185.0	340.0
7	Rodrigo Narvaez (NCA)	103.81	130.0	170.0	300.0
8	Carl Henriquez (ARU)	104.22	130.0	157.5	287.5
–	Frank Cepeda (DOM)	104.39	157.5	~~185~~	–

=== Super heavyweight (+ 105 kg) ===
Rank	Name	Bodyweight	Snatch	Clean & jerk	Total (kg)
1st place, gold medalist(s)	Shane Hamman (USA)	159.61	175.0	207.5	382.5
2nd place, silver medalist(s)	Cristian Escalante (CHI)	117.71	177.5	202.5	380.0
3rd place, bronze medalist(s)	Plaiter Reyes (DOM)	129.21	165.0	207.5	372.5
4	Edries Gonzalez (PUR)	109.04	165.0	205.0	370.0
5	Modesto Sanchez (DOM)	132.23	162.5	207.5	370.0
6	Hidelgar Morillo (VEN)	114.58	160.0	195.0	355.0
7	Roque Reinoso (DOM)	134.93	150.0	192.5	342.5

== Women's competition ==
=== Flyweight (– 48 kg) ===
Rank	Name	Bodyweight	Snatch	Clean & jerk	Total (kg)
1st place, gold medalist(s)	Tara Nott (USA)	47.95	77.5	100.0	177.5
2nd place, silver medalist(s)	Leddy Zuluaga (COL)	45.60	67.5	85.0	152.5
3rd place, bronze medalist(s)	Guillermina Candelario (DOM)	46.26	65.0	80.0	145.0
4	Elohim Gracía (MEX)	47.59	60.0	75.0	135.0
5	Olvina Gómez (GUA)	47.53	55.0	75.0	130.0
6	Indira Berrios (HON)	45.30	55.0	70.0	125.0
–	Remigia Arcila (VEN)	47.29	70.0	~~95.0~~	–
–	Wendy Santana (DOM)	47.20	~~67.5~~	87.5	–

=== Featherweight (– 53 kg) ===
Rank	Name	Bodyweight	Snatch	Clean & jerk	Total (kg)
1st place, gold medalist(s)	Robin Goad (USA)	52.42	85.0	102.5	187.5
2nd place, silver medalist(s)	Nancy Maneiro (VEN)	52.00	77.5	97.5	175.0
3rd place, bronze medalist(s)	Luz Gallego (COL)	52.68	72.5	95.0	167.5
4	Viviana Muñoz (COL)	52.39	70.0	92.5	162.5
5	Sandra Rosas (ECU)	52.41	72.5	85.0	157.5
6	Fabiana Fernández (ARG)	52.89	62.5	82.5	145
7	Maria Jorge (BRA)	52.42	60.0	80.0	140.0
–	Melanie Kosoff (USA)	52.90	75.0	~~102.5~~	–

=== Lightweight (– 58 kg) ===
Rank	Name	Bodyweight	Snatch	Clean & jerk	Total (kg)
1st place, gold medalist(s)	Maryse Turcotte (CAN)	57.56	87.5	112.5	200.0
2nd place, silver medalist(s)	Nancy Niro (CAN)	57.92	87.5	105.0	192.5
3rd place, bronze medalist(s)	Soraya Jiménez (MEX)	57.19	85.0	105.0	190.0
4	Ruth Rivera (PUR)	57.56	67.5	95.0	162.5
5	Patricia Sosa (ESA)	57.41	67.5	92.5	160.0
–	Liliana García (VEN)	57.32	80.0	~~105.0~~	–

=== Middleweight (– 63 kg) ===
Rank	Name	Bodyweight	Snatch	Clean & jerk	Total (kg)
1st place, gold medalist(s)	Meil McGerrigle (CAN)	61.62	85.0	110.0	195.0
2nd place, silver medalist(s)	Alejandra Perea (COL)	60.10	82.5	105.0	187.5
3rd place, bronze medalist(s)	Sención Quezada (DOM)	61.77	80.0	102.5	182.5
4	Gretty Lugo (VEN)	60.28	80.0	100.0	180.0
5	Jennifer López (PUR)	61.41	72.5	95.0	167.5
6	Elsa Caldera (NCA)	59.82	67.5	90.0	157.5
–	Noemi Rivera (PUR)	62.99	80.0	~~100.0~~	–

=== Light-heavyweight (– 69 kg) ===
Rank	Name	Bodyweight	Snatch	Clean & jerk	Total (kg)
1st place, gold medalist(s)	Lea Foreman (USA)	68.75	100.0	115.0	215.0
2nd place, silver medalist(s)	Miosotis Heredia (DOM)	68.24	95.0	110.0	205.0
3rd place, bronze medalist(s)	Eva María Dimas (ESA)	67.71	92.5	107.5	200.0
4	Khadijah Hunter (USA)	68.98	90.0	110.0	200.0
5	Julie Malenfant (CAN)	66.65	90.0	105.0	195.0
6	Carmen Pérez (VEN)	67.83	82.5	105.0	187.5
7	Iris de Moscoso (GUA)	68.81	72.5	92.5	165.0
8	Nelly Betanco (NCA)	67.21	60.0	80.0	140.0
–	Raquel Rombley (DOM)	68.88	85.0	~~112.5~~	–

=== Heavyweight (– 75 kg) ===
Rank	Name	Bodyweight	Snatch	Clean & jerk	Total (kg)
1st place, gold medalist(s)	Wanda Rijo (DOM)	73.68	100.0	120.0	220.0
2nd place, silver medalist(s)	Cara Heads (USA)	73.26	97.5	120.0	217.5
3rd place, bronze medalist(s)	Jean Lassen (CAN)	73.73	92.5	117.5	210.0
4	Theresa Brick (CAN)	74.80	95.0	115.0	210.0
5	Mayra Martínez (VEN)	73.60	87.5	112.5	200.0
6	María Ruiz Obando (NCA)	73.28	75.0	107.5	182.5
7	Nelly Rivera (DOM)	69.73	70.0	82.5	152.5

=== Super-heavyweight (+ 75 kg) ===
Rank	Name	Bodyweight	Snatch	Clean & jerk	Total (kg)
1st place, gold medalist(s)	Cheryl Haworth (USA)	136.16	117.5	135.0	252.5
2nd place, silver medalist(s)	María Isabel Urrutia (COL)	89.06	107.5	140.0	247.5
3rd place, bronze medalist(s)	Carmenza Delgado (COL)	88.61	110.0	135.0	245.0
4	Nelly Acosta (PUR)	87.50	95.0	105.0	200.0
5	Suzanne Dandenault (CAN)	101.43	85.0	112.5	197.5

== Medal table ==
Rank	Nation	Gold	Silver	Bronze	Total
1	United States	5	1	3	9
2	Colombia	3	5	3	11
3	Cuba	3	1	0	4
4	Canada	2	1	1	4
5	Ecuador	1	2	0	3
6	Dominican Republic	1	1	3	5
7	Guatemala	0	1	1	2
7	Venezuela	0	1	1	2
9	Argentina	0	1	0	1
9	Chile	0	1	0	1
11	El Salvador	0	0	1	1
11	Mexico	0	0	1	1
11	Panama	0	0	1	1
Totals (13 entries)		15	15	15	45

== See also ==
- Weightlifting at the 2000 Summer Olympics
