= Horikoshi =

Horikoshi (written: 堀越) is a Japanese surname. Notable people with the surname include:

- Jiro Horikoshi (堀越 二郎, 1903–1982), Japanese aerospace engineer
- Kōhei Horikoshi (堀越 耕平, born 1986), Japanese manga artist
- Mami Horikoshi (堀越 真己, born 1960), Japanese voice actress
- Noriaki Horikoshi (堀越 典昭, born 1972), Japanese weightlifter

== See also ==
- Horikoshi High School, a high school in Nakano, Tokyo, Japan
