= Carlos Hernández (weightlifter, born 1972) =

Cuban weightlifter

Personal information
- Born: June 8, 1972 (age 54) Ciego de Ávila, Cuba
Medal record
Men's weightlifting
Representing Cuba
Pan American Games
Gold medal – first place	1995 Mar del Plata	Middle-Heavyweight
Gold medal – first place	1999 Winnipeg	Middle-Heavyweight

Carlos Alexis Hernández Calderón (born June 8, 1972 in Ciego de Ávila) is a retired male weightlifter from Cuba. He competed for his native country at the 1996 Summer Olympics, finishing in sixth place in the overall-rankings of the men's middle-heavyweight division. He twice won a gold medal at the Pan American Games: 1995 and 1999.
