= Orlando Vásquez (weightlifter, born 1969) =

Nicaraguan weightlifter

Personal information
- Born: March 13, 1969 (age 57)
Medal record
Men's Weightlifting
Representing Nicaragua
Pan American Games
Bronze medal – third place	1991 Havana	Flyweight
Bronze medal – third place	1995 Mar del Plata	Flyweight

Orlando Antonio Vásquez Mendoza (born March 13, 1969) is a retired male weightlifter from Nicaragua. He competed in two Summer Olympics for his native Central American country during his career, and twice (1991 and 1995) claimed a bronze medal at the Pan American Games in the men's flyweight division.
