= Weightlifting at the 1995 Pan American Games =

This page shows the results of the Weightlifting Competition at the 1995 Pan American Games, held from March 11 to March 26, 1995, in Mar del Plata, Argentina. There were a total number of ten medal events, just for men.

== Medal table ==
Rank	Nation	Gold	Silver	Bronze	Total
1	Cuba	8	2	0	10
2	United States	1	2	4	7
3	Venezuela	1	0	2	3
4	Colombia	0	3	2	5
5	Argentina	0	3	0	3
6	Ecuador	0	0	1	1
6	Nicaragua	0	0	1	1
Totals (7 entries)		10	10	10	30

== Medal overview ==
=== Men ===
Event		Gold		Silver		Bronze	
–54 kg (Flyweight)	Snatch	Jesús Aparicio (CUB)	110.0 kg	Orlando Vásquez (NCA)	107.5 kg	Juan Carlos Fernández (COL)	105.0 kg
–54 kg (Flyweight)	Clean & Jerk	Juan Carlos Fernández (COL)	142.5 kg	Jesús Aparicio (CUB)	142.5 kg	Orlando Vásquez (NCA)	135.0 kg
–54 kg (Flyweight)	Total	Jesús Aparicio (CUB)	252.5 kg	Juan Carlos Fernández (COL)	247.5 kg	Orlando Vásquez (NCA)	242.5 kg
–59 kg (Bantamweight)	Snatch	William Vargas (CUB)	127.5 kg	Bryan Jacob (USA)	120.0 kg	Roger Berrio (COL)	112.5 kg
–59 kg (Bantamweight)	Clean & Jerk	William Vargas (CUB)	157.5 kg	Bryan Jacob (USA)	147.5 kg	Johnny Gonzales Beltran (COL)	142.5 kg
–59 kg (Bantamweight)	Total	William Vargas (CUB)	285.0 kg	Bryan Jacob (USA)	267.5 kg	Johnny Gonzales Beltran (COL)	252.5 kg
–64 kg (Featherweight)	Snatch	Idalberto Aranda (CUB)	127.5 kg	Gustavo Majauskas (ARG)	125.0 kg	Marcelo Gandolfo (ARG)	122.5 kg
–64 kg (Featherweight)	Clean & Jerk	Idalberto Aranda (CUB)	175.0 kg	Gustavo Majauskas (ARG)	160.0 kg	Henry Blanco (VEN)	157.5 kg
–64 kg (Featherweight)	Total	Idalberto Aranda (CUB)	302.5 kg	Gustavo Majauskas (ARG)	285.0 kg	Henry Blanco (VEN)	277.5 kg
–70 kg (Lightweight)	Snatch	Rafael Gómez (CUB)	137.5 kg	Tim McRae (USA)	137.5 kg	Gabriel Lemme (ARG)	135.0 kg
–70 kg (Lightweight)	Clean & Jerk	Rafael Gómez (CUB)	175.0 kg	Eyne Acevedo (COL)	175.0 kg	José Medina (VEN)	172.5 kg
–70 kg (Lightweight)	Total	Rafael Gómez (CUB)	312.5 kg	Eyne Acevedo (COL)	310.0 kg	Tim McRae (USA)	310.0 kg
–76 kg (Middleweight)	Snatch	Pablo Lara (CUB)	155.0 kg	Álvaro Velasco (COL)	147.5 kg	Walter Llerena (ECU)	142.5 kg
–76 kg (Middleweight)	Clean & Jerk	Pablo Lara (CUB)	207.5 kg WR	Álvaro Velasco (COL)	180.0 kg	David Santillo (USA)	170.0 kg
–76 kg (Middleweight)	Total	Pablo Lara (CUB)	362.5 kg	Álvaro Velasco (COL)	327.5 kg	Walter Llerena (ECU)	310.0 kg
–83 kg (Light-heavyweight)	Snatch	Julio Luna (VEN)	150.0 kg	Gustavo Stasiukiewicz (ARG)	145.0 kg	Eduardo Moreno (CUB)	145.0 kg
–83 kg (Light-heavyweight)	Clean & Jerk	Julio Luna (VEN)	192.5 kg	Eduardo Moreno (CUB)	190.0 kg	Erlyn Mena (COL)	182.5 kg
–83 kg (Light-heavyweight)	Total	Julio Luna (VEN)	342.5 kg	Eduardo Moreno (CUB)	335.0 kg	Erlyn Mena (COL)	322.5 kg
–91 kg (Middle-heavyweight)	Snatch	Carlos Hernández (CUB)	165.0 kg	Darío Lecman (ARG)	162.5 kg	Tom Gough (USA)	155.0 kg
–91 kg (Middle-heavyweight)	Clean & Jerk	Darío Lecman (ARG)	202.5 kg	Carlos Hernández (CUB)	200.0 kg	Tom Gough (USA)	192.5 kg
–91 kg (Middle-heavyweight)	Total	Carlos Hernández (CUB)	365.0 kg	Darío Lecman (ARG)	365.0 kg	Tom Gough (USA)	347.5 kg
–99 kg (First-heavyweight)	Snatch	Peter Kelley (USA)	157.5 kg	Claudio Henschke (ARG)	155.0 kg	Emilson Dantas (BRA)	155.0 kg
–99 kg (First-heavyweight)	Clean & Jerk	Alexander Fonseca (CUB)	200.0 kg	Claudio Henschke (ARG)	190.0 kg	Emilson Dantas (BRA)	187.5 kg
–99 kg (First-heavyweight)	Total	Alexander Fonseca (CUB)	352.5 kg	Claudio Henschke (ARG)	345.0 kg	Peter Kelley (USA)	345.0 kg
–108 kg (Heavyweight)	Snatch	Osvaldo Bango (CUB)	165.0 kg	Wes Barnett (USA)	165.0 kg	Ramón Álvarez (PUR)	152.0 kg
–108 kg (Heavyweight)	Clean & Jerk	Wes Barnett (USA)	210.0 kg	Osvaldo Bango (CUB)	190.0 kg	Pedro Marin (VEN)	190 kg
–108 kg (Heavyweight)	Total	Wes Barnett (USA)	375.0 kg	Osvaldo Bango (CUB)	355.0 kg	Pedro Marin (VEN)	342.5 kg
+108 kg (Super heavyweight)	Snatch	Mark Henry (USA)	177.5 kg	Modesto Sánchez (CUB)	175.0 kg	Mario Martinez (USA)	160.0 kg
+108 kg (Super heavyweight)	Clean & Jerk	Modesto Sánchez (CUB)	215.0 kg	Mario Martinez (USA)	202.5 kg	Mark Henry (USA)	192.5 kg
+108 kg (Super heavyweight)	Total	Modesto Sánchez (CUB)	390.0 kg	Mark Henry (USA)	370.0 kg	Mario Martinez (USA)	362.5 kg

== See also ==
- Weightlifting at the 1996 Summer Olympics
