= Julio Luna (weightlifter) =

Venezuelan weightlifter (born 1973)

Personal information
- Born: January 7, 1973 (age 53)
Medal record
Men's Weightlifting
Representing Venezuela
Pan American Games
Gold medal – first place	1995 Mar del Plata	Light-Heavy
Gold medal – first place	2003 Santo Domingo	Middle-Heavy
Silver medal – second place	1991 Havana	Light-Heavy
Silver medal – second place	2007 Rio de Janeiro	Middle-Heavy
Bronze medal – third place	1999 Winnipeg	Middle-Heavy
Central American and Caribbean Games
Silver medal – second place	2006 Cartagena	– 105 kg

Julio César Luna Fermín (born January 7, 1973, in Maturín, Monagas) is a male weightlifter from Venezuela. He competed in four consecutive Summer Olympics for his native South American country during his career, starting in 1992. Luña carried the flag for Venezuela at the opening ceremony of the 2004 Summer Olympics in Athens, Greece.
