= Weightlifting at the 1991 Pan American Games =

This page shows the results of the Weightlifting Competition at the 1991 Pan American Games, held from August 2 to August 18, 1991 in Havana, Cuba. There were a total number of ten medal events, just for men and all won by hosts Cuba.

== Men's competition ==
=== Flyweight (– 52 kg) ===
RANK	FINAL
Gold medal	Héctor Arzola (CUB)
Silver medal	Humberto Fuentes Rodríguez (VEN)
Bronze medal	Orlando Vásquez (NIC)

=== Bantamweight (– 56 kg) ===
RANK	FINAL
Gold medal	William Vargas Trujillo (CUB)
Silver medal	José Farfán (VEN)
Bronze medal	Carlos David (COL)

=== Featherweight (– 60 kg) ===
RANK	FINAL
Gold medal	Pedro Negrín (CUB)
Silver medal	Bryan Jacob (USA)
Bronze medal	John Salazar (COL)

=== Lightweight (– 67.5 kg) ===
RANK	FINAL
Gold medal	Víctor Echevarría (CUB)
Silver medal	Eyne Acevedo (COL)
Bronze medal	José Alexander Medina (VEN)

=== Middleweight (– 75 kg) ===
RANK	FINAL
Gold medal	Pablo Lara Rodríguez (CUB)
Silver medal	Álvaro Velasco (COL)
Bronze medal	Jorge Kassar (VEN)

=== Light-heavyweight (– 82.5 kg) ===
RANK	FINAL
Gold medal	Emilio Lara Rodríguez (CUB)
Silver medal	Julio César Luña (VEN)
Bronze medal	Dean Goad (USA)

=== Middle-heavyweight (– 90 kg) ===
RANK	FINAL
Gold medal	Pedro Rodríguez (CUB)
Silver medal	Brett Brian (USA)
Bronze medal	Paul Flescher (USA)

=== First-heavyweight (– 100 kg) ===
RANK	FINAL
Gold medal	Omar Semanat (CUB)
Silver medal	Wes Barnett (USA)
Bronze medal	Edmilson Silva (BRA)

=== Heavyweight (– 110 kg) ===
RANK	FINAL
Gold medal	Ernesto Montoya (CUB)
Silver medal	Richard Schutz (USA)
Bronze medal	Humberto Gómez (COL)

=== Super heavyweight (+ 110 kg) ===
RANK	FINAL
Gold medal	Ernesto Aguero (CUB)
Silver medal	Mario Martinez (USA)
Bronze medal	Jeff Michels (USA)

== Medal table ==
Rank	Nation	Gold	Silver	Bronze	Total
1	Cuba	10	0	0	10
2	United States	0	5	3	8
3	Venezuela	0	3	2	5
4	Colombia	0	2	3	5
5	Brazil	0	0	1	1
5	Nicaragua	0	0	1	1
Totals (6 entries)		10	10	10	30

== See also ==
- Weightlifting at the 1992 Summer Olympics
