= Jim Schmitz =

Jim or James Schmitz may refer to:

- Jim Schmitz (baseball coach)
- Jim Schmitz (weightlifting coach)
- James H. Schmitz (1911–1981), German-American science fiction writer
