= Bryan Jacob =

American weightlifter (born 1969)

Personal information
- Born: February 1, 1969 (age 57) Palatka, Florida, United States

Sport
- Sport: Weightlifting
Medal record
Representing United States
Pan American Games
Silver medal – second place	1991 Havana	-60kg
Silver medal – second place	1995 Mar del Plata	-59kg

Bryan Alan Jacob (born February 1, 1969) is an American former weightlifter. He competed at the 1992 Summer Olympics and the 1996 Summer Olympics.
