= Marcelo Gandolfo =

Argentine weightlifter (born 1972)

Personal information
- Nationality: Argentine
- Born: 6 July 1972 (age 53)

Sport
- Sport: Weightlifting
Medal record
Representing Argentina
Pan American Games
Bronze medal – third place	1995 Mar del Plata	-64kg snatch

Marcelo Gustavo Gandolfo López (born 6 July 1972) is an Argentine weightlifter. He competed at the 1992 Summer Olympics and the 1996 Summer Olympics.
