= Peter Kelley =

American weightlifter (born 1974)

Personal information
- Born: May 9, 1974 (age 52)
Medal record
Men's Weightlifting
Representing the United States
Pan American Games
Bronze medal – third place	1995 Mar del Plata	– 99 kg

Peter Kelley (born May 9, 1974) is an Olympic weightlifter for the United States. His coaches are Dennis Snethen, Dragomir Cioroslan, and Paul Fleschler. He currently holds the snatch record in the 105-kilogram (231 lb) weight class with a lift of 172.5 kilograms (380 lb), set at the 2004 U.S. Olympic Weightlifting trials.

== Personal life ==
Kelley was born in St. Joseph, Missouri.
