= Kazem Panjavi =

Iranian weightlifter

Personal information
- Nationality: Iranian
- Born: 5 September 1966 (age 60) Sardasht, Iran

Sport
- Sport: Weightlifting

Kazem Panjavi (Persian: کاظم پنجوی, born 5 September 1966) is an Iranian weightlifter. He competed in the men's lightweight event at the 1992 Summer Olympics.
