= José Medina (weightlifter) =

Venezuelan weightlifter (born 1970)

Personal information
- Born: April 21, 1970 (age 56)
Medal record
Men's Weightlifting
Representing Venezuela
Pan American Games
Bronze medal – third place	1991 Havana	Lightweight
Bronze medal – third place	1995 Mar del Plata	Lightweight

José Alexander Medina (born April 21, 1970) is a retired male weightlifter from Venezuela. He competed for his native South American country at the 1992 Summer Olympics in Barcelona, Spain.
