= Mohamed Meziane (weightlifter) =

Moroccan weightlifter

Personal information
- Nationality: Moroccan
- Born: 7 March 1967 (age 59)

Sport
- Sport: Weightlifting

Mohamed Meziane (born 7 March 1967) is a Moroccan weightlifter. He competed in the men's lightweight event at the 1992 Summer Olympics.
