= Figure skating at the 1987 Pan American Games =

Figure skating at the Pan American Games

Figure skating events for men, women, and mixed pairs were held at the 1987 Pan American Games.

== Men's events ==
Event	Gold	Silver	Bronze
Freeskating	Gregg Smith; United States	Scott Cohen; United States	Edwin Guevara; Colombia
Figures	Skip Clinton; United States	Kevin Carroll; United States	Juan Reckziergel; Argentina

== Women's events ==
Event	Gold	Silver	Bronze
Freeskating	Pattie Jefferson; United States	Tammy Jerue; United States	Carolina Saldaño; Argentina
Figures	Debbie Erdmann; United States	Renee Gerig; United States	Claudia di Luciano; Argentina

== Mixed events ==
Event	Gold	Silver	Bronze
Pairs	Robyn Young & Ken Benson; United States	Cindy South & Dion Gentile; United States	Claudia Dominguez & Juan Nieto; Colombia
Ice dancing	Lori Walsh & Rob Ferendo; United States	Allen Desterhaft & Julie Hider; United States	James Crouch & Heather Paterson; Canada
