= Vernon Patao =

American weightlifter (born 1970)

Personal information
- Born: February 13, 1970 (age 56) Wailuku, Hawaii, United States

Sport
- Sport: Weightlifting

Vernon Patao (born February 13, 1970) is an American former weightlifter. He competed in the men's lightweight event at the 1992 Summer Olympics and the men's featherweight event at the 1996 Summer Olympics.
