= Plaiter Reyes =

Dominican Republic weightlifter

Personal information
- Nationality: Dominican
- Born: 16 December 1970 Santa Cruz de Barahona, Dominican Republic
- Died: 15 July 2017 (aged 46) Jarabacoa, Dominican Republic

Sport
- Sport: Weightlifting
Medal record
Representing Dominican Republic
Pan American Games
Bronze medal – third place	1999 Winnipeg	+105kg

Plaiter Reyes Medina (16 December 1970 – 15 July 2017) was a Dominican Republic weightlifter. He competed in the men's super heavyweight event at the 2000 Summer Olympics.
