= Ernesto Aguero =

Cuban weightlifter (born 1969)

Personal information
- Born: October 1, 1969 (age 56)
Medal record
Men's Weightlifting
Representing Cuba
Pan American Games
Gold medal – first place	1991 Havana	Super-Heavyweight

Ernesto Aguero Shell (born October 1, 1969) is a retired male weightlifter from Cuba. He competed for his native country at the 1992 Summer Olympics, finishing in fourth place in the Men's Middle-Heavyweight division. He won a gold medal at the 1991 Pan American Games.
