= Wang Yong (weightlifter) =

Chinese weightlifter

Personal information
- Nationality: Chinese
- Born: 16 March 1968 (age 58)

Sport
- Sport: Weightlifting

Wang Yong (born 16 March 1968) is a Chinese weightlifter. He competed in the men's lightweight event at the 1992 Summer Olympics.
