= Juan Carlos Fernández (weightlifter) =

Colombian weightlifter (born 1976)

Personal information
- Born: Juan Carlos Fernández Garzón; March 3, 1976 (age 50)
Medal record
Men's Weightlifting
Representing Colombia
Pan American Games
Silver medal – second place	1995 Mar del Plata	– 54 kg
Bronze medal – third place	1999 Winnipeg	– 56 kg

Juan Carlos Fernández Garzón (born March 3, 1976) is a male weightlifter from Colombia. He won a silver medal for his native South American country at the 1995 Pan American Games. He also competed at the 1996 Summer Olympics, finishing in 8th place in the men's flyweight division.
