= Colombia at the 1987 Pan American Games =

- IOC code: COL
- NOC: Colombian Olympic Committee
- Website: www.olimpicocol.co (in Spanish)

in Indianapolis 7–23 August 1987
- Medals Ranked 8th: Gold 3 Silver 8 Bronze 13 Total 24

Pan American Games appearances (overview)
- 1951; 1955; 1959; 1963; 1967; 1971; 1975; 1979; 1983; 1987; 1991; 1995; 1999; 2003; 2007; 2011; 2015; 2019; 2023

The 10th Pan American Games were held in Indianapolis, United States from 7 to 23 August 1987.

== Medals ==
=== Gold ===
===== Roller skating =====
- Women's Track 5000m: Luz Tristán

=== Silver ===
===== Roller skating =====
- Men's Track 10000m: César Hurtado
- Men's Track 20000m: César Hurtado
- Women's Track 5000m: Isabel Gutiérrez

=== Bronze ===
===== Athletics =====
- Men's 20 km Road Walk: Querubín Moreno
- Men's 50 km Road Walk: Héctor Moreno

===== Fencing =====
- Men's Team épée

===== Figure skating =====
- Men's Freeskating: Edwin Guevara
- Pairs: Claudia Dominguez & Juan Nieto

===== Judo =====
- Men's Featherweight (-65 kg): Eduardo Landazury
- Men's Middleweight (-86 kg): William Medina

===== Roller skating =====
- Men's Track 1500m: Hernán Díaz
- Men's Long Program: Edwin Guevara
- Women's Track 3000m: Luz Tristán
- Women's Track 5000m Relay
- Artistic Mixed pairs

== See also ==
- Colombia at the 1988 Summer Olympics
