= Tennis at the 1995 Pan American Games =

This page shows the results of the Tennis Competition for men and women at the 1995 Pan American Games, held from March 11 to March 26, 1995, in Mar del Plata, Argentina.

== Men's competition ==
=== Singles ===
RANK	NAME
Gold medal	Hernán Gumy (ARG)
Silver medal	Javier Frana (ARG)
Bronze medal	Jimy Szymanski (VEN)
Bronze medal	Nicolás Pereira (VEN)

=== Doubles ===
RANK	NAME
Gold medal	Argentina; Javier Frana; Luis Lobo
Silver medal	Venezuela; Jimy Szymanski
Bronze medal	Chile; Sergio Cortés; Gabriel Silberstein
Bronze medal	Mexico

=== Teams ===
RANK	NAME
Gold medal	Argentina
Silver medal	Uruguay
Bronze medal	Chile
Bronze medal	United States

== Women's competition ==
=== Singles ===
RANK	NAME
Gold medal	María Florencia Labat (ARG)
Silver medal	Ann Grossman (USA)
Bronze medal	Bettina Fulco (ARG)
Bronze medal	Chanda Rubin (USA)

=== Doubles ===
RANK	NAME
Gold medal	Argentina; Mercedes María Paz; Patricia Tarabini
Silver medal	United States; Ann Grossman Chanda Rubin
Bronze medal	Brazil
Bronze medal	Mexico

=== Teams ===
RANK	NAME
Gold medal	Argentina
Silver medal	Chile
Bronze medal	Brazil
Bronze medal	United States

== Mixed Competition ==
RANK	NAME
Gold medal	United States; Shaun Stafford; Jack Waite
Silver medal	Argentina
Bronze medal	Cuba; Juan Pino; Belkis Rodríguez
Bronze medal	Venezuela

== Medal table ==
Place	Nation	Gold medal	Silver medal	Bronze medal	Total
1	Argentina	6	2	1	9
2	United States	1	2	3	6
3	Venezuela	0	1	3	4
4	Chile	0	1	2	3
5	Uruguay	0	1	0	1
6	Brazil	0	0	2	2
7	Mexico	0	0	2	2
8	Cuba	0	0	1	1
Total		7	7	14	28
