= Emilio Lara (weightlifter) =

Cuban weightlifter (born 1970)

Personal information
- Born: October 7, 1970 (age 55)
Medal record
Men's Weightlifting
Representing Cuba
Pan American Games
| Gold medal – first place | 1991 Havana | Light-Heavyweight |

Emilio Lara Rodríguez (born October 7, 1970) is a retired male weightlifter from Cuba. He competed for his native country at the 1992 Summer Olympics, finishing in sixth place in the Men's Middle-Heavyweight division. He won a gold medal at the 1991 Pan American Games. He is the brother of weightlifter Pablo Lara.
