= Roller sports at the 1991 Pan American Games =

Roller skating and roller hockey were contested at the 1991 Pan American Games, held in August in Havana, Cuba.

== Roller skating ==
=== Men's events ===
Speed

Event	Gold	Silver	Bronze
300 metres time-trial	Anthony Muse; United States	Orlando Valencia; Colombia	Doug Glass; United States
1500 metres	Guillermo Botero; Colombia	Guillermo Herrero; Argentina	Dante Muse; United States
5000 metres	Anthony Muse; United States	Dante Muse; United States	Orlando Valencia; Colombia
10000 metres	Francisco Fuentes; Chile	Dante Muse; United States	Guillermo McCargo; Argentina
20000 metres	Dante Muse; United States	Guillermo Trinaroli; Argentina	Guillermo Mata; Costa Rica
10000m Relay	Colombia	Argentina	Chile

=== Women's events ===
Speed

Event	Gold	Silver	Bronze
300 metres time-trial	María Richardson; Argentina	Darlene Kessinger; United States	Claudia Ruiz; Colombia
1500 metres	María Eva Richardson; Argentina	Danielle Lewis; United States	Jenny Duarte; Colombia
3000 metres	Rosana Sastre; Argentina	Claudia Ruiz; Colombia	Claudia Rodríguez; Argentina
5000 metres	Claudia Rodríguez; Argentina	Rosana Sastre; Argentina	Deanna Parker; United States
10000 metres	Rosana Sastre; Argentina	Claudia Rodríguez; Argentina	Deanna Parker; United States
5000m Relay	Argentina	Colombia	United States

== Roller hockey ==
=== Men ===
Event	Gold	Silver	Bronze
Team	Argentina	Brazil	United States

== Medal table ==
Place	Nation	Gold medal	Silver medal	Bronze medal	Total
1	Argentina	7	5	2	14
2	United States	3	4	6	13
3	Colombia	2	3	3	8
4	Chile	1	0	1	2
5	Brazil	0	1	0	1
6	Costa Rica	0	0	1	8
Total		13	13	13	39
