= Roller sports at the 1979 Pan American Games =

Roller skating and roller hockey were contested at the 1979 Pan American Games, held in San Juan, Puerto Rico.

== Roller skating ==
=== Men's events ===
Speed

Event	Gold	Silver	Bronze
500 metres	Kenneth Sutton; United States	Curtis Cook; United States	Reynaldo Vega; Argentina
500 metres Pair Elimination	Kenneth Sutton; United States	Reynaldo Vega; Argentina	Raul Subiledt; Argentina
3000 metres Mass Start	Raul Subiledt; Argentina	Curtis Cook; United States	Christopher Snyder; United States
5000 metres Mass Start	Tom Peterson; United States	Adalberto Lugea; Argentina	Humberto Triana; Colombia
10,000 metres	Tom Peterson; United States	Christopher Snyder; United States	Jose Ramírez; Colombia
20,000 metres	Tom Peterson; United States	Christopher Snyder; United States	Raul Subiledt; Argentina
10,000m Relay	United States	United States	Argentina

Artistic

Event	Gold	Silver	Bronze
Long Program	Fred Morante; United States	Alexander Kane; United States	Guy Aubin; Canada

=== Women's events ===
Speed

Event	Gold	Silver	Bronze
500 metres	Nora Vega; Argentina	Linda Dorso; United States	Elaine Coley; United States
500 metres Pairs Elimination	Nora Vega; Argentina	Linda Dorso; United States	Claudia Rodríguez; Argentina
3000 metres Mass Start	Nora Vega; Argentina	Claudia Rodríguez; Argentina	Linsue Peterson; United States
5000 metres	Claudia Rodríguez; Argentina	Suzanne Dooley; United States	Sonia Freigeiro; Argentina
5000m Relay	Argentina	United States	United States

Artistic

Event	Gold	Silver	Bronze
Long Program	Natalie Dunn; United States	JoAnne Young; United States	Sylvie Gingras; Canada

=== Mixed events ===
Event	Gold	Silver	Bronze
Pairs	United States	United States	Canada
Dance	United States	United States	Canada

== Roller hockey ==
=== Men ===
Event	Gold	Silver	Bronze
Team	Argentina	Brazil	Chile

== Medal table ==
Rank	Nation	Gold	Silver	Bronze	Total
1	United States	10	13	4	27
2	Argentina	7	3	6	16
3	Brazil	0	1	0	1
4	Canada	0	0	4	4
5	Colombia	0	0	2	2
6	Chile	0	0	1	1
Totals (6 entries)		17	17	17	51
