= Tim McRae =

American weightlifter (born 1970)

Personal information
- Born: August 4, 1970 (age 56)
Medal record
Men's Weightlifting
Representing the United States
Pan American Games
Bronze medal – third place	1995 Mar del Plata	– 70 kg
Bronze medal – third place	1999 Winnipeg	– 85 kg

Timothy McRae (born August 4, 1970) is a former Olympic weightlifter for the United States. His coach was Dragomir Cioroslan. He currently coaches Weightlifting at New Smyrna Beach High School.

== Weightlifting achievements ==
- Olympic Team member (1992 and 1996)
- Senior American record holder in snatch, clean and jerk, and total (1993–1997)

On April 24, 2010, he coached the New Smyrna Beach Barracudas Boys Weightlifting team to their first state title in school history. They are the only team in the school to win a state title. Since, New Smyrna Beach Boys Weightlifting have won two more titles (2014, 2015).
