= Adrián Mandarano =

Argentine field hockey player

Adrián Mandarano (born 4 October 1968) is an Argentine former field hockey player who competed in the 1992 Summer Olympics.
