= Roller sports at the 1995 Pan American Games =

Roller skating and roller hockey were contested at the 1995 Pan American Games, held in Mar del Plata, Argentina.

== Roller skating ==
=== Men's events ===
Speed

Event	Gold	Silver	Bronze
300 metres road	Derek Parra; United States	Anthony Muse; United States	Sergio Daniel McCargo; Argentina
300 metres track	Anthony Muse; United States	Derek Parra; United States	Sergio Daniel McCargo; Argentina
500 metres road	Anthony Muse; United States	Julián Fernández; Colombia	Sergio Daniel McCargo; Argentina
500 metres track	Anthony Muse; United States	Derek Parra; United States	Adrian Victor Villegas; Argentina
1500 metres road	Derek Parra; United States	Jorge Botejo Naranjo; Colombia	Chad Hedrick; United States
1500 metres track	Julián Fernández; Colombia	Anthony Muse; United States	Adrian Victor Villegas; Argentina
10,000 metres road	Chad Hedrick; United States	Martín Alejo Escobar; Argentina	Jorge Botejo Naranjo; Colombia
10,000 metres track	Chad Hedrick; United States	Jorge Botejo Naranjo; Colombia	Martín Alejo Escobar; Argentina
20,000 metres road	Derek Parra; United States	Jorge Botejo Naranjo; Colombia	Chad Hedrick; United States
20,000 metres track	Chad Hedrick; United States	Jorge Botejo Naranjo; Colombia	Derek Parra; United States
Marathon	Derek Parra; United States	Chad Hedrick; United States	Guillermo Trinaroli; Argentina
10,000m Relay	United States	Colombia	Argentina

Artistic

Event	Gold	Silver	Bronze
Freeskating	Eric Anderson; United States	Edwin Guevara; Colombia	Heath Medeiros; United States
Figures	Steven Findlay; United States	Ernesto Tamagnon; Argentina	Jason Moreton; Canada

=== Women's events ===
Speed

Event	Gold	Silver	Bronze
300 metres track	Nora Vega; Argentina	Gipsy Lucas; United States	Lina Zapata; Colombia
500 metres road	Lina Zapata; Colombia	Heather Laufer; United States	Gipsy Lucas; United States
500 metres track	Heather Laufer; United States	Gipsy Lucas; United States	Nora Vega; Argentina
1500 metres road	Heather Laufer; United States	Andrea Gónzalez; Argentina	María Richardson; Argentina
1500 metres track	Isabel Henao; Colombia	Rosana Sastre; Argentina	Cheryll Ezzell; United States
1500 metres track	Gipsy Lucas; United States	Nora Vega; Argentina	Heather Laufer; United States
5000 metres road	Cheryll Ezzell; United States	Rosana Sastre; Argentina	Marcela Caceres; Chile
10,000 metres road	Vicci King; United States	Rosana Sastre; Argentina	Marcela Caceres; Chile
10,000 metres track	Cheryll Ezzell; United States	Marcela Caceres; Chile	Natalia Martínez; Argentina
2000 mts points	Rosana Sastre; Argentina	Vicci King; United States	Isabel Henao; Colombia
Half Marathon	Marcela Caceres; Chile	Rosana Sastre; Argentina	Cheryll Ezzell; United States
5000m Relay	Argentina	Chile	Colombia

Artistic

Event	Gold	Silver	Bronze
Freeskating	Dezera Salas; United States	Canela Emede; Argentina	Maria Rodriguez; Argentina
Figures	April Dayney; United States	Jennifer Jill Rodriguez; United States	Carolina Pogliano; Argentina

=== Mixed events ===
Event	Gold	Silver	Bronze
Pairs	Argentina	United States	United States
Dance	United States	Canada	Argentina

== Roller hockey ==
=== Men ===
Event	Gold	Silver	Bronze
Team	Argentina	United States	Brazil

== Medal table ==
Place	Nation	Gold medal	Silver medal	Bronze medal	Total
1	United States	22	11	9	42
2	Argentina	5	9	14	28
3	Colombia	3	7	5	15
4	Chile	1	2	2	5
5	Canada	0	1	1	2
6	Brazil	0	1	0	1
Total		31	31	31	92
