= Roller sports at the 1987 Pan American Games =

Roller skating and roller hockey were contested at the 1987 Pan American Games, held in Indianapolis, USA.

== Roller skating ==
=== Men's events ===
Speed

Event	Gold	Silver	Bronze
300 metres time-trial	José Lozano; Argentina	Doug Glass; United States	Anthony Muse; United States
Track 1500m	Dante Muse; United States	Guillermo McCargo; Argentina	Hernán Díaz; Colombia
Track 5000m	José Lozano; Argentina	Dante Muse; United States	Marcelo Losauro; Argentina
Track 10000m	José Lozano; Argentina	César Hurtado; Colombia	Mike Müller; United States
Track 20000m	José Lozano; Argentina	César Hurtado; Colombia	Doug Glass; United States
Track 10000m Relay	Argentina; Argentina	United States of America; United States	Costa Rica; Costa Rica

Artistic

Event	Gold	Silver	Bronze
Figure skating	Skip Clinton; United States	Kevin Carroll; United States	Juan Reckziegel; Argentina
Long Program	Gregg Smith; United States	Scott Cohen; United States	Edwin Guevara; Colombia

=== Women's events ===
Speed

Event	Gold	Silver	Bronze
300 metres time-trial	Beth Tucker; United States	Darlene Kessinger; United States	Patricia Cerezo; Argentina
Track 1500m	Nora Meledi; Argentina	Lori Feger; United States	Claudia Rodríguez; Argentina
Track 3000m	Darlene Kessinger; United States	Luz Tristán; Colombia	Beth Tucker; United States
Track 5000m	Luz Tristán; Colombia	Isabel Gutiérrez; Colombia	Deanna Parker; United States
Track 10000m	Rosana Sastre; Argentina	Beth Tucker; United States	Brenda Nyll; Puerto Rico
Track 5000m Relay	United States of America; United States	Argentina; Argentina	Colombia; Colombia

Artistic

Event	Gold	Silver	Bronze
Figure skating	Debbie Erdman; United States	Renee Gerig; United States	Claudia DiLuciano; Argentina
Free skating	Debbie Erdman; United States	Renee Gerig; United States	Claudia DiLuciano; Argentina

=== Mixed events ===
Artistic

Event	Gold	Silver	Bronze
Mixed pairs	United States	United States	Colombia
Pairs free dance	United States	United States	Canada

== Roller hockey ==
=== Men ===
Event	Gold	Silver	Bronze
Team	Argentina	United States	Brazil

== Medal table ==
Place	Nation	Gold medal	Silver medal	Bronze medal	Total
1	United States	10	13	5	28
2	Argentina	8	2	6	16
3	Colombia	1	4	4	9
4	Canada	0	0	1	1
4	Brazil	0	0	1	1
4	Puerto Rico	0	0	1	1
4	Costa Rica	0	0	1	4
Total		19	19	19	57
