= Daniel Ruiz (field hockey) =

Argentine field hockey player

Daniel Ruiz (born 9 May 1969) is an Argentine former field hockey player who competed in the 1992 Summer Olympics.
