= Álvaro Velasco (weightlifter) =

Colombian weightlifter (born 1971)

Personal information
- Born: March 3, 1971 (age 55)
Medal record
Men's Weightlifting
Representing Colombia
Pan American Games
Gold medal – first place	1999 Winnipeg	– 85 kg
Silver medal – second place	1991 Havana	– 75 kg
Silver medal – second place	1995 Mar del Plata	– 76 kg

Álvaro Augusto Velasco Alzate (born March 3, 1971) is a retired male weightlifter from Colombia, who thrice won a medal for his native South American country at the Pan American Games: in 1991, 1995 and 1999. He twice competed at the Summer Olympics (1992 and 1996), finishing in 12th place in the men's middleweight division in Atlanta, Georgia (1996).
