= Sofija Tepes =

Chilean table tennis player

Personal information
- Nationality: Chilean
- Born: 18 March 1973 (age 52)

Sport
- Sport: Table tennis

Sofija Tepes (born 18 March 1973) is a Chilean table tennis player with Croatian ancestors immigrant to Chile. She competed at the 1992 Summer Olympics, the 1996 Summer Olympics, and the 2000 Summer Olympics..Sofija started playing table tennis at the age of 8 years old. She integrated the Chilean National Team at the age of 18 years old, after winning her classification in year 1991 and continued under the couching of Mr. Ren Guoqiang (national counsel of the Chinese National Table Tennis Team). In parallel, Sofija completed studies at the Business School Administration at the University of Chile working in finances in order to matain her sports activities. During her active sports career she obtained several recognitions such as, only some examples: a) Silver Medal at the 1995 Pan-American Games of Mar del Plata, Argentine; b) Bronze Medal at the 1999 Pan-American Games of Winnipeg, Canada; c) 2 Gold Medals in Women Singles at the Latin American Championships of Mexico; d) Women Gold Medal in 1996 at the Odesur South American Games, Valencia, Venezuela. Besides, she was several times champion in single and in team Women´s contests in Chile until her retirement. Presently, she plays senior championships in South America, works as a Table Tennis trainer at the University of Chile and works for the National Institute of Sports in Chile in the area of supervision of Olympic Federations.
