= Eyne Acevedo =

Colombian weightlifter (born 1970)

Personal information
- Nationality: Colombian
- Born: 6 February 1970 (age 56)
- Weight: 67 kg (148 lb)

Sport
- Sport: Weightlifting
Medal record
Representing Colombia
Pan American Games
Silver medal – second place	1991 Havana	-67.5kg clean & jerk
Silver medal – second place	1991 Havana	-67.5kg total
Silver medal – second place	1995 Mar del Plata	-70kg clean & jerk
Silver medal – second place	1995 Mar del Plata	-70kg total
Bronze medal – third place	1991 Havana	-67.5kg snatch
Central American and Caribbean Games
Silver medal – second place	1990 Mexico City	-67.5kg clean & jerk
Silver medal – second place	1990 Mexico City	-67.5kg snatch
Silver medal – second place	1990 Mexico City	-67.5kg total
Silver medal – second place	1993 Ponce	-76kg clean & jerk
Silver medal – second place	1993 Ponce	-76kg snatch
Silver medal – second place	1993 Ponce	-76kg total

Eyne Acevedo Tabares (born 6 February 1970) is a Colombian weightlifter. He competed in the 1992 Summer Olympics.
