= Pablo Lara (weightlifter) =

Cuban weightlifter (born 1968)

Personal information
- Born: 30 May 1968 (age 58) Santa Clara, Cuba
Medal record
Men's Weightlifting
Olympic Games
Gold medal – first place	1996 Atlanta	– 76 kg
Silver medal – second place	1992 Barcelona	– 75 kg
World Championships Total
Gold medal – first place	1991 Donaueschingen	– 75 kg
Gold medal – first place	1994 Istanbul	– 76 kg
Gold medal – first place	1995 Guangzhou	– 76 kg
Bronze medal – third place	1989 Athens	– 75 kg

Pablo Lara Rodríguez (born 30 May 1968 in Santa Clara) is a Cuban weightlifter. He won a gold medal in the middleweight class at the 1996 Summer Olympics in Atlanta. He is the brother of Emilio Lara. He spent several years in prison for possessing firearms.
