= John Salazar (weightlifter) =

Colombian weightlifter (born 1965)

Personal information
- Nationality: Colombian
- Born: 4 March 1965 (age 60)

Sport
- Sport: Weightlifting

John Salazar (born 4 March 1965) is a Colombian former weightlifter. He competed in the men's featherweight event at the 1988 Summer Olympics.
