= Jim Schmitz (weightlifting coach) =

American weightlifting coach (born 1945)

Personal information
- Nationality: American
- Born: August 16, 1945
- Occupations: Strength and conditioning coach, Business owner
- Website: www.nevertoostrong.org

Sport
- Country: United States
- Sport: Weightlifting
- Club: The Sports Palace

James Schmitz (born August 16, 1945) is an American weightlifting coach from Ukiah, California. He coached the U.S. Olympic Weightlifting team in 1980, 1988, 1992. He also served as the President of USA Weightlifting from 1988 to 1996, and was a member of the International Weightlifting Federation's Executive Board from 1992 to 1996. Throughout his career as a coach, he has coached over 10 Olympians over a total of 7 consecutive Olympic Games. Notably, he coached American weightlifter Mario Martinez, who won a silver medal in the super-heavyweight division at the 1984 Olympics. He was also a frequent writer for Milo magazine, and is known for naming the exercise now known as the "Romanian Deadlift".

== Life ==
Schmitz was born in San Francisco in August, 1945. He then grew up in Ukiah, California, and started getting involved in competitive sports at around 12 years old. At the age of 15, he started weightlifting in the pursuit of becoming a bigger, stronger athlete. After graduating high school, he joined the San Francisco State football team as a linebacker.

While an athlete at San Francisco State, Schmitz continued weightlifting in the university's weight room. In 1964, Schmitz started training with Walt Gioseffi, a nationally ranked weightlifter at the time. With Gioseffi's encouragement, Schmitz signed up for his first weightlifting competition in April 1966, kicking off his career as a competitive weightlifter. Eventually, Schmitz started teaching some friends and teammates how to lift weights, becoming an "unofficial weight coach" for the team.

Schmitz eventually became captain of the San Francisco State football team in 1967, and graduated with a degree in physical education in 1968.

== Career ==
After graduating from San Francisco State, Schmitz became a co-owner of Alex's Sports Palace Gym on Mission Street in San Francisco, marking Schmitz's official start as a full-time weightlifting coach. In 1972, Schmitz bought out his partners, moved the gym to a new location on Valencia Street, and shortened the name of the gym to the "Sports Palace".

During these initial years, several athletes would have success while training at the Sports Palace, leading more and more talented athletes to join his gym. This included future olympians such as Ken Patera, Dan Cantore, Bruce Wilhelm, and Ken Clark. In 1982, the Sports Palace won the USA Weightlifting National Championships, defeating the York Barbell Club, which had won the title for 29 years in a row. In this same decade, the Sports Palace would go on to win 7 more national championships.

In 1984, Schmitz served as the Competition Director for Weightlifting at the 1984 Olympic Games in Los Angeles. At this competition, Schmitz's athlete Mario Martinez would go on to snatch 185 kilograms (408 pounds) and clean and jerk 225 kilograms (496 pounds), earning him a silver medal in the super-heavyweight division.

From 1988 to 1996, Schmitz served as the President of USA Weightlifting. From 1992 to 1996, he served on the Executive Board of the International Weightlifting Federation, where he helped women's weightlifting secure a spot in the 2000 Olympics.
