= Athletics at the 1995 Pan American Games – Men's shot put =

Men's shot put at the Pan American Games

The men's shot put event at the 1995 Pan American Games was held at the Estadio Atletico "Justo Roman" on 18 March.

== Results ==
| Rank | Name | Nationality | #1 | #2 | #3 | #4 | #5 | #6 | Result | Notes |
|---|---|---|---|---|---|---|---|---|---|---|
| 1st place, gold medalist(s) | C. J. Hunter | United States | 20.52 | x | x | x | x | 19.44 | 20.52 | GR |
| ~~2~~ | Gregg Tafralis | United States | ~~19.51~~ | ~~19.74~~ | ~~19.49~~ | ~~19.85~~ | ~~19.52~~ | ~~19.53~~ | ~~19.85~~ | Doping |
| 2nd place, silver medalist(s) | Jorge Montenegro | Cuba | 18.30 | 18.94 | 18.79 | 18.40 | 18.61 | 18.64 | 18.94 | |
| 3rd place, bronze medalist(s) | Gert Weil | Chile | 18.32 | 18.32 | 18.66 | 18.71 | 18.60 | 18.48 | 18.71 | |
| 4 | Yojer Medina | Venezuela | 18.42 | 18.34 | 18.17 | 17.46 | 17.99 | 17.71 | 18.42 | |
| 5 | Scott Cappos | Canada | 17.91 | 17.24 | 18.06 | 17.75 | 17.44 | 17.15 | 18.06 | |
| 6 | Adrián Marzo | Argentina | 15.26 | 15.19 | 15.89 | 15.41 | x | 15.52 | 15.89 | |
| 7 | Jaime Comandari | El Salvador | 15.05 | 15.21 | 15.05 | 14.68 | x | x | 15.21 | |
| 8 | Brian Bynoe | Dominica | 14.84 | x | 14.88 | | | | 14.88 | |
| 9 | Clifford Worme | Grenada | 14.38 | 14.79 | x | | | | 14.79 | |
| 10 | Curtley Bynoe | Dominica | 13.07 | 13.56 | 13.93 | | | | 13.93 | |
| | Marcelo Pugliese | Argentina | | | | | | | DNS | |
