= Noriaki Horikoshi =

Japanese weightlifter

Personal information
- Nationality: Japanese
- Born: 5 September 1972 (age 52)

Sport
- Sport: Weightlifting

Noriaki Horikoshi (堀越 典昭, Horikoshi Noriaki, born 5 September 1972) is a Japanese weightlifter. He competed at the 1992 Summer Olympics and the 1996 Summer Olympics.
