= 1987 Pan American Games =

10th edition of the Pan American Games

X Pan American Games
- Host: Indianapolis, United States
- Nations: 38
- Athletes: 4,360
- Events: 297 in 30 sports
- Opening: August 8, 1987
- Closing: August 23, 1987
- Opened by: Vice President George H. W. Bush
- Cauldron lighter: Wilma Rudolph
- Main venue: Indianapolis Motor Speedway (opening) / Hoosier Dome (closing)

Summer

Winter

The 1987 Pan American Games, officially known as the X Pan American Games, was a major international multi-sport event held in Indianapolis, Indiana, United States, on August 7–23, 1987. Over 4,300 athletes from 38 countries in the Americas competed in 297 events in 30 sports, earning 1,015 medals. Events were held at 23 venues in and around Indianapolis. The official mascot for the games was Amigo, a green parrot.

== Host city selection ==
Santiago, Chile, was originally named the host of the tenth Pan American Games, but it withdrew in 1983 due to political and financial problems. Quito, Ecuador, was named to replace Santiago, but it also withdrew, in late 1984. Desperate, the Pan American Sports Organization (PASO) held a new election. Indianapolis was planning to bid on the 1991 Games, but, at the request of the United States Olympic Committee, submitted a bid for 1987. Since many sports facilities were already in place, PASO announced on December 18, 1984, that Indianapolis would be the host. Havana, Cuba, was also interested, but PASO appeased Fidel Castro, who had threatened to boycott the games, by agreeing to give Havana the 1991 Games, provided Cuba participated in the 1987 Games in Indianapolis.

== Organization ==
The city of Indianapolis created an organizing committee called Pan American Ten/Indianapolis (PAX/I). It had eighteen operating divisions, 300 paid staff, and 37,000 volunteers.

=== Symbols ===
Amigo, the 1987 Pan American Games mascot

The logo of the 1987 Pan Am Games consisted of five stylized X's, the Roman numeral for ten. Designed by Michael Hayes of the JMH Corporation in Indianapolis, the seven colors represented the wildlife and flags of western hemisphere countries. The mascot was Amigo, a green parrot, designed by Jerry Reynolds of Perennial Pictures in Indianapolis. Amigo represented friendliness and festivity. The official music of the X Pan American Games was Pan American Fanfare by Lalo Schifrin.

=== Broadcasting rights ===
The rights for the 1987 games were won by CBS with a bid of $4,000,000, and Brent Musburger hosted. CBS aired 26 hours of coverage, all on weekend afternoons, including live coverage of the Opening Ceremony from the Indianapolis Motor Speedway. Additionally, CBS provided the world feed. Because these games were first since the Cuban Revolution in which Cuban athletes were competing in the United States, the ratings were boosted by their participation, providing a United States-Cuba showdown in many events.

== Venues ==
The 1987 Pan Am Games were held at a total of 23 sites. The athletes village, which provided lodging and dining for the athletes, was located at Fort Benjamin Harrison in Lawrence, Indiana.

Venues for the 1987 Pan American Games
Venue	Location	Sport(s)/Events
Eagle Creek Park	Indianapolis, Indiana	Archery, Canoeing, Rowing
IU Michael A. Carroll Track & Soccer Stadium	Indianapolis, Indiana	Athletics
Bush Stadium	Indianapolis, Indiana	Baseball
Market Square Arena	Indianapolis, Indiana	Basketball
Brown County State Park	Nashville, Indiana	Mountain Biking
Indiana Convention Center	Indianapolis, Indiana	Boxing, Fencing, Field Hockey, Rhythmic gymnastics
Hoosier Dome	Indianapolis, Indiana	Closing ceremonies, Gymnastics, Handball
Major Taylor Velodrome	Indianapolis, Indiana	Cycling
Indiana University Natatorium	Indianapolis, Indiana	Diving, Swimming, Synchronized swimming, Water polo
Hoosier Horse Park	Edinburgh, Indiana	Equestrian events
Indianapolis Motor Speedway	Speedway, Indiana	Opening ceremonies, Speed roller skating, Cycling
Carmel Ice Skadium	Carmel, Indiana	Roller hockey, Roller figure skating
Kuntz Memorial Soccer Stadium	Indianapolis, Indiana	Soccer
IUPUI Softball Complex	Indianapolis, Indiana	Softball
IUPUI Gymnasium	Indianapolis, Indiana	Taekwondo, Judo
Indianapolis Tennis Center	Indianapolis, Indiana	Tennis
Circle Theatre	Indianapolis, Indiana	Weightlifting
University of Indianapolis	Indianapolis, Indiana	Wrestling
Lake Michigan	Michigan City, Indiana	Yachting

== Games ==
=== Opening ceremony ===
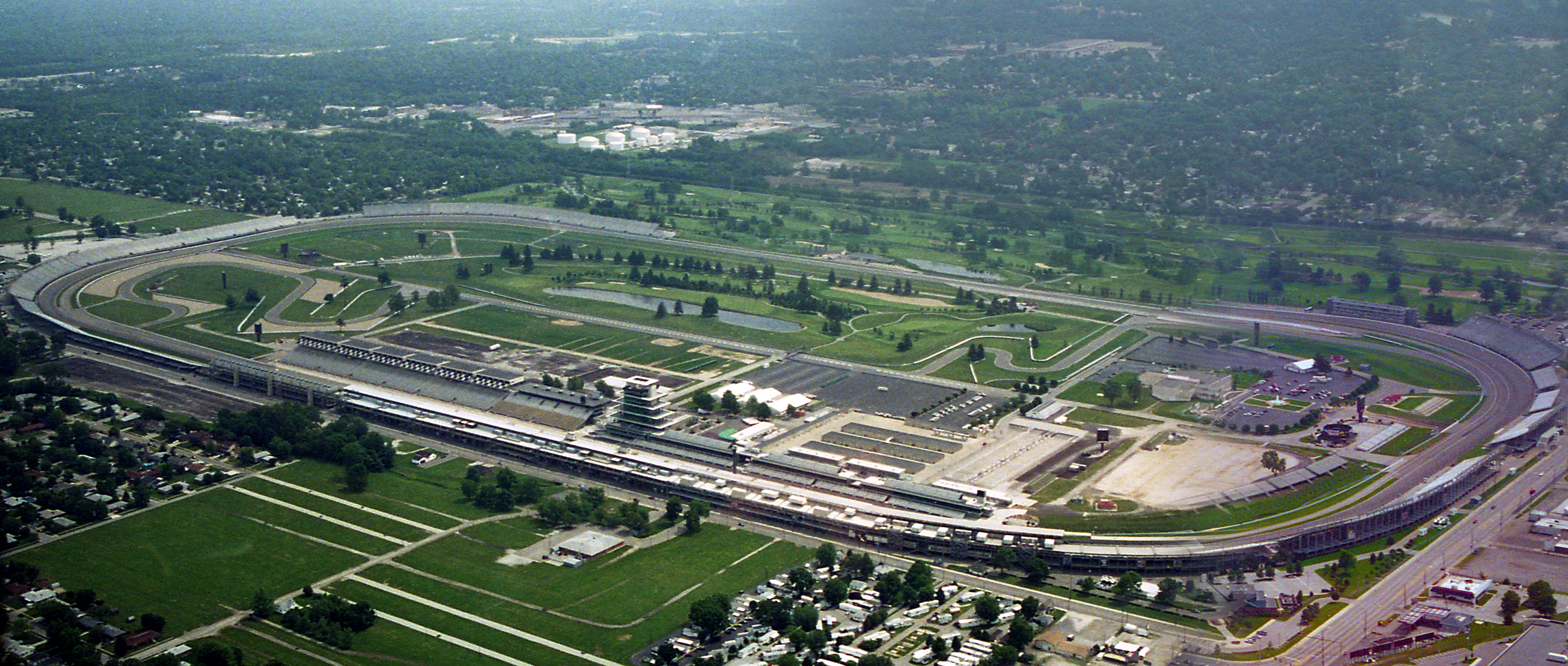
Opening ceremonies and speed roller skating were held in the Indianapolis Motor Speedway

The opening ceremony was held on the main straight of the Indianapolis Motor Speedway, the site of the Indianapolis 500. Crowd size reports range from 69,518, the official capacity of the stadium proper, to 80,000. The show, The Magic that is America, was produced by The Walt Disney Company at a cost of several million dollars. The 6,500 performers made it the largest outdoor live entertainment show held in the United States up to that date, and the largest opening ceremony of the Pan Am games. The organizers had originally budgeted $2.5 million for the opening and closing ceremonies, but all the proposals by Disney exceeded that figure, so the committee decided to use that entire amount to stage the opening ceremony.

Sandi Patty was a featured singer and the show included hot air balloons and military fighter jets. Dignitaries included IOC President Juan Antonio Samaranch, Indianapolis Mayor William H. Hudnut III, Indiana Governor Robert D. Orr, and PASO President Mario Vazquez Raña.

U.S. Vice President George H. W. Bush officially opened the games, and additional security protocols for his presence led to about 5000 people being delayed in lines, with twelve people fainting.

Flag bearers in the Parade of Nations included the games' oldest athlete, 70-year-old yachtsman Durward Knowles of the Bahamas, basketball star José Ortiz of Puerto Rico, and baseball pitcher Jim Abbott of the United States. The Canadian delegation engaged with the crowd by playing frisbee with them.

In keeping with Pan American Games tradition, a flame was lit at Cerro de la Estrella in Mexico City. The flame was flown to Chicago on July 16, and was carried along an 1,100-mile torch relay that encircled the state of Indiana before arriving in Indianapolis on August 7. Money raised during the torch relay was donated to Indianapolis's Riley Hospital for Children, which received more than $10,000. The final leg of the torch relay had the flame passed from Indianapolis-born basketball player Oscar Robertson to gymnast Kristie Phillips to sprinter Wilma Rudolph, also from Indianapolis, who lit the cauldron.

During the opening ceremony, a plane chartered by anti-Castro Cuban-American activists flew a banner urging Cuban athletes to defect.

=== Events ===
- Thirty sports were contested at the tenth Pan American Games for a total of 321 events. Five were contested for the first time in 1987, including handball.

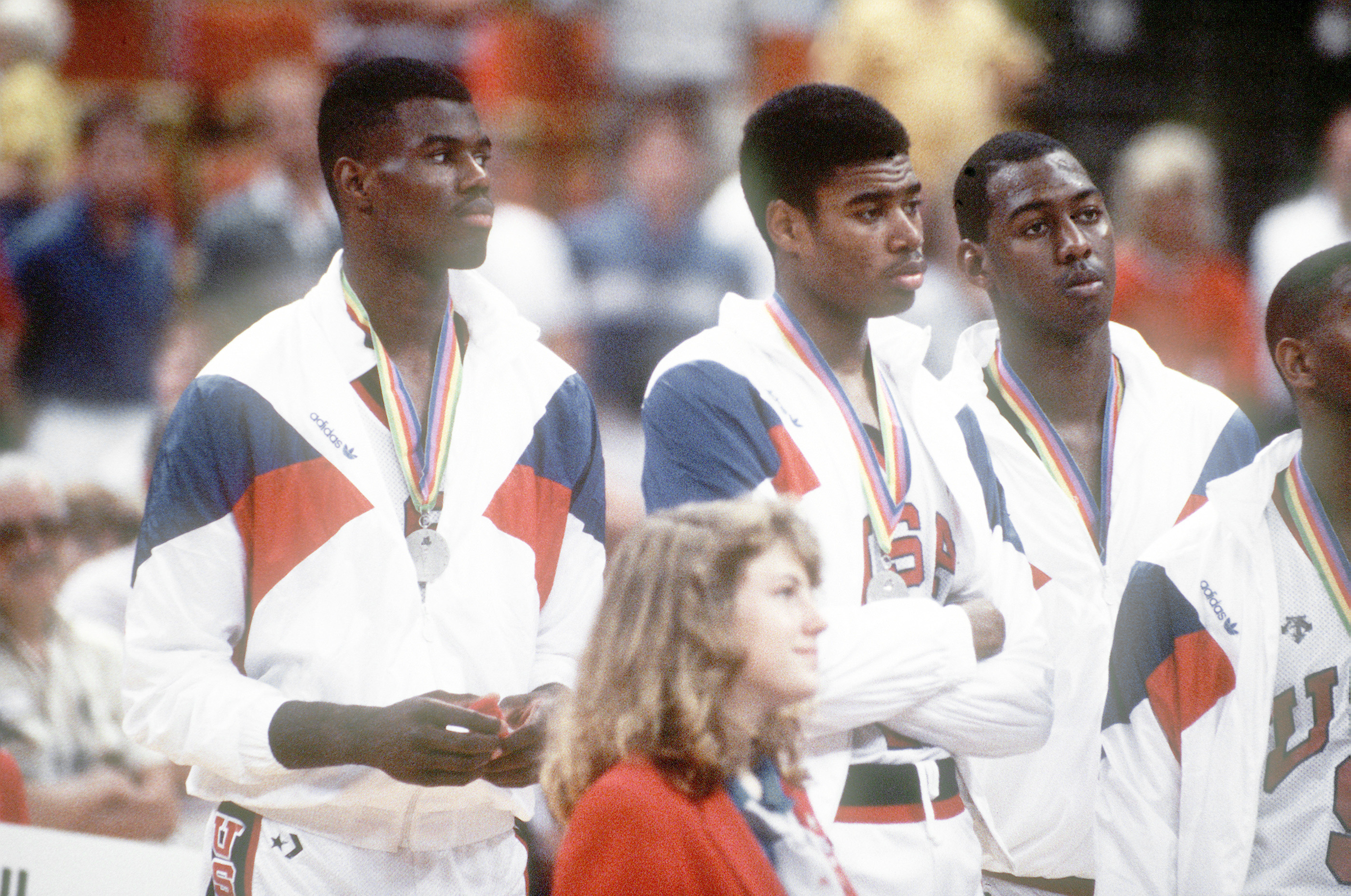
The United States' basketball team included a young David Robinson

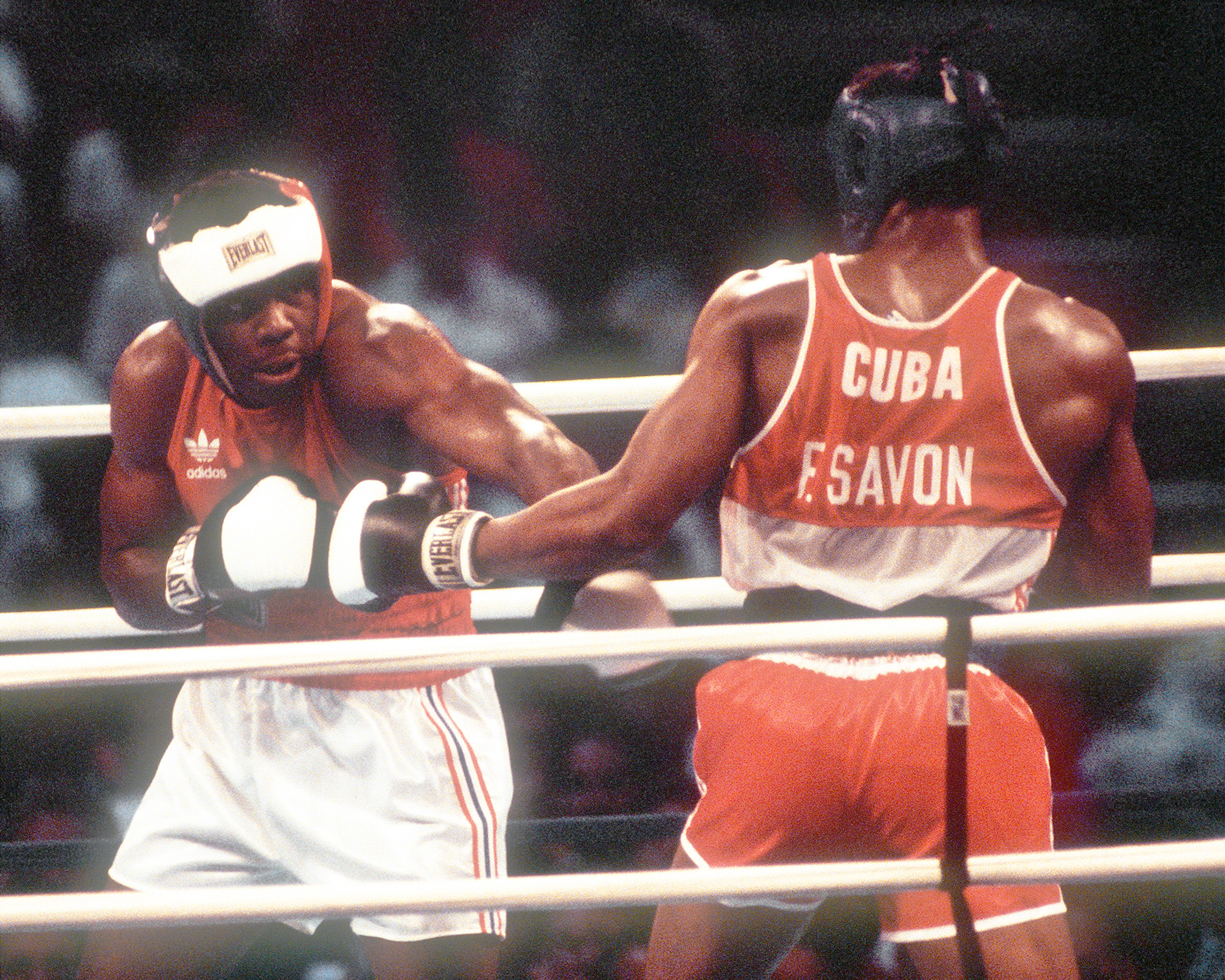
American Michael Bentt and Cuban Félix Savón in a boxing match

- Archery
- Athletics
- Baseball
- Basketball
- Boxing
- Canoeing
- Cycling
- Diving
- Equestrian
- Fencing
- Field hockey
- Figure skating
- Football (soccer)
- Gymnastics
- Handball
- Judo
- Modern Pentathlon
- Roller skating
- Rowing
- Sailing
- Shooting
- Softball
- Swimming
- Synchronized swimming
- Table tennis
- Taekwondo
- Tennis
- Volleyball
- Water polo
- Weightlifting
- Wrestling

=== Participating nations ===
38 nations participated in the tenth Pan American Games. Four countries competed for the first time in 1987: Aruba, British Virgin Islands, Cayman Islands, and Grenada.

- Antigua and Barbuda (28)
- Argentina (377)
- Aruba (45)
- Bahamas (50)
- Barbados (85)
- Belize (43)
- Bermuda (72)
- Bolivia (28)
- Brazil (410)
- British Virgin Islands
- Canada (631)
- Cayman Islands
- Chile (105)
- Colombia (260)
- Costa Rica
- Cuba (535)
- Dominican Republic (135)
- Ecuador (60)
- El Salvador (93)
- Grenada (7)
- Guatemala (92)
- Guyana (17)
- Haiti (4)
- Honduras
- Jamaica (108)
- Mexico (353)
- Netherlands Antilles (92)
- Nicaragua (40)
- Panama (100)
- Paraguay (65)
- Peru (110)
- Puerto Rico (341)
- Suriname
- Trinidad and Tobago (80)
- United States (743)
- Virgin Islands
- Uruguay (107)
- Venezuela (210)

=== Protests involving the Cuban delegation during the games ===
Tension between Cuba and the United States had already been an issue with the selection of Indianapolis over Havana for the site of the games, and a Cuban boycott had been avoided only when Fidel Castro received a promise that the 1991 Pan American Games would be held in Havana. After the incident with a plane flying a banner urging Cuban athletes to defect in the opening ceremony, Cuban immigrants to the United States continued to use the games as a way to confront the Castro regime, using the Cuban athletes as a proxy. This games marked the first time since the Cuban Revolution that Cuban athletes had participated in the United States. At a baseball game in Bush Stadium between Cuba and the Netherlands Antilles the day after the opening ceremony, Cuban-American protestors taunted the Cuban players, threw flyers at them, and mocked them with offers of cash. A fight broke out, but only one bystander was injured and hospitalized after Indianapolis police broke up the fight by preventing the Cuban players from entering the stands. At a subsequent game against Puerto Rico, some Cuban players were able to enter the stands to chase protestors before being stopped.

During boxing events at the Indiana Convention Center, anti-Castro Cuban-American protestors mocked the Cuban boxers from the stands. The police were unable to stop the Cuban boxers from entering the stands and punching the protestors in retaliation. According to witnesses, up to a dozen Cuban boxers, including Pablo Romero, as well as a hundred spectators were involved. Two people were hospitalized. After these incidents Manuel Gonzalez Guerra, who was Cuba's top sports official, publicly demanded that organizers keep the anti-Castro protestors away from the Cuban athletes. In private, he also unsuccessfully asked the Indianapolis police chief to lock the activists up. Mark Miles, the president of the organizing committee, made a phone call to the Ronald Reagan administration in the White House, who subsequently pressed Cuban-American activists groups to dial down the pressure by the final week.

=== Medal count ===
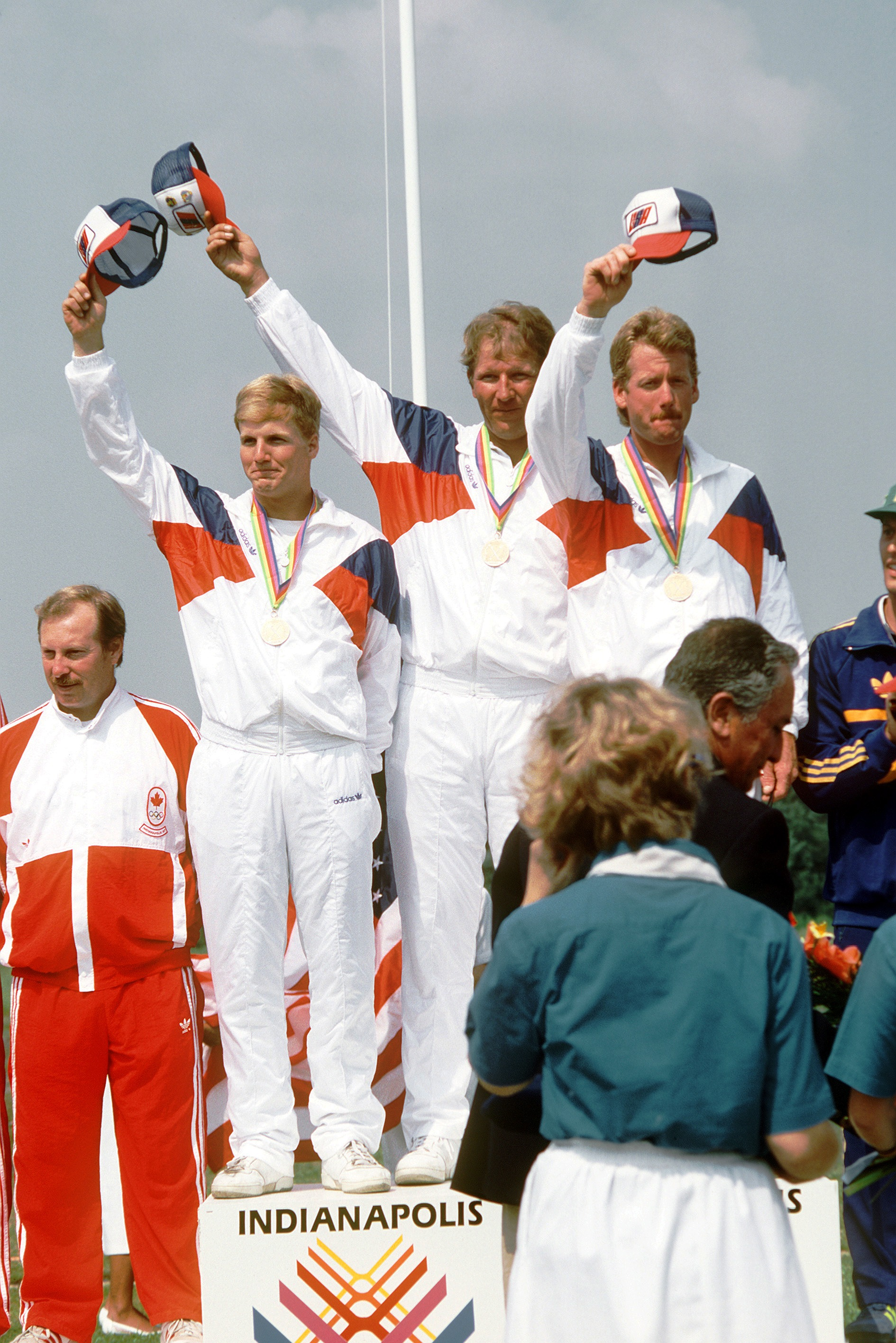
The United States received the most medals. Pictured here is their trap shooting team receiving gold

1
Host nation

Medals by nation in the 1987 Pan American Games
Rank	Nation	Gold	Silver	Bronze	Total
1	United States ^{1} ^{a}	169/168	120/118	81/83	370/369
2	Cuba	75	52	48	175
3	Canada ^{a}	30	56/57	75	161/162
4	Brazil	14	14	33	61
5	Argentina	12	14	22	48

Notes The medal counts for the United States and Canada differ in various sources.

=== Indianapolis Museum of Art exhibition ===
Coinciding with the Pan American Games was the Indianapolis Museum of Art exhibition Art of the Fantastic: Latin America, 1920–1987. The exhibition presented 125 works by artists from a variety of nations, including Argentina, Brazil, Chile, Colombia, Cuba, Mexico, Nicaragua, Peru, Puerto Rico, the United States, Uruguay, and Venezuela. Well-known artists such as Frida Kahlo and Roberto Matta were featured, as well as artists who had never exhibited outside their native country. The show was the first large-scale presentation of 20th-century Latin American art in the U.S. in over 20 years and was the museum's first contemporary exhibition to travel.

=== Closing ceremony ===
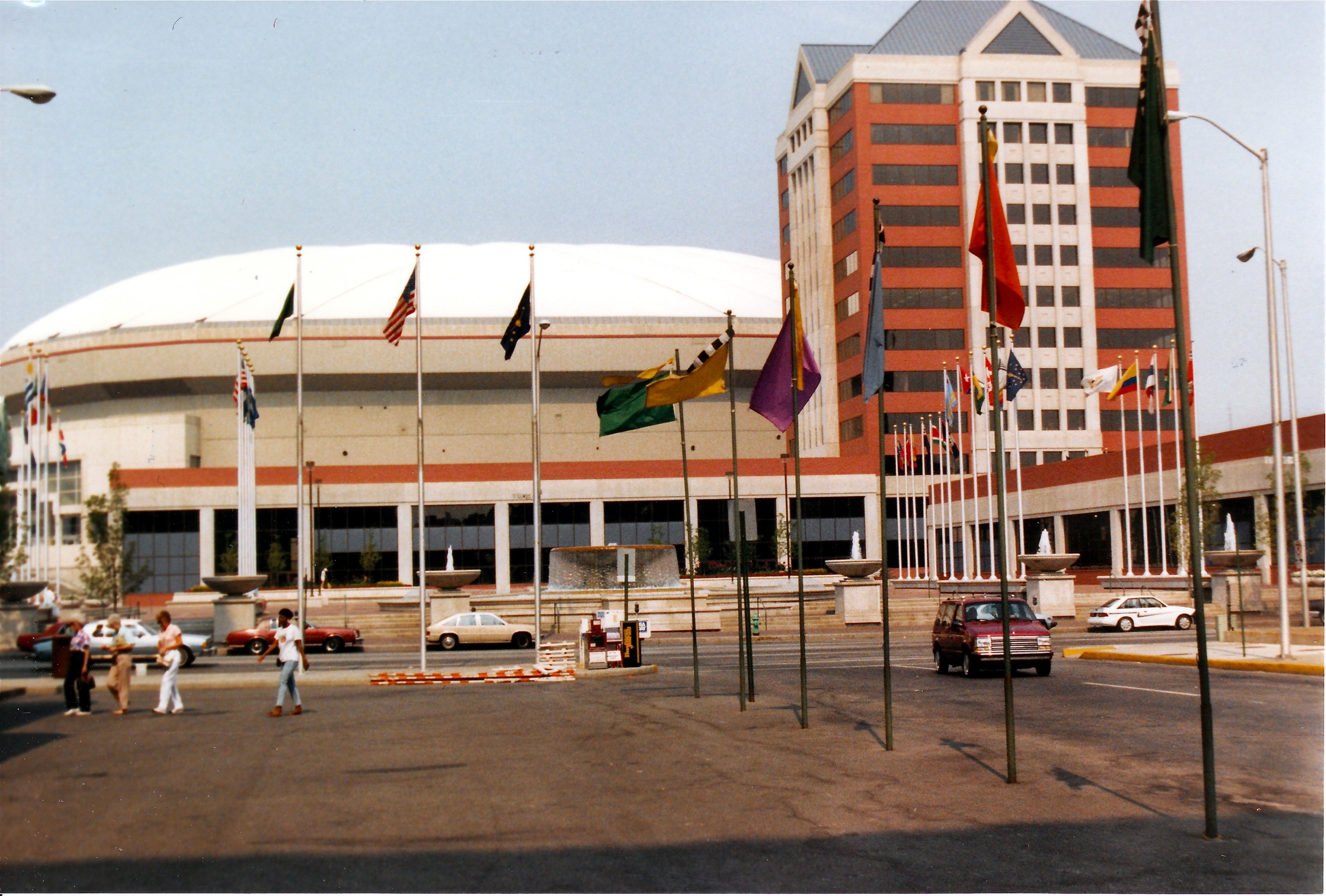
Pan American Plaza in 1988. Closing ceremonies were held inside the Hoosier Dome. These were the first Pan American Games to feature closing ceremonies in an indoor space.

The closing ceremony was initially planned to take place at the American Legion Mall, a popular site for open air events on the Indiana World War Memorial Plaza in downtown Indianapolis. However, in April, the management of the American Legion objected because of protocol issues: the flag of the host country (the United States) would be lowered and that of the host country of the next Pan American games (Cuba), with whom the U.S. had hostile relations, would be raised to fly by itself. In June, the organizing committee decided to relocate the ceremony to the Hoosier Dome. Because the gymnastics finals were scheduled to end only a few hours before the closing ceremony, it was decided to use only a portion of the dome, limiting attendance to 35,000 instead of 60,000. Despite the initial budget for all ceremonies having been allocated exclusively to the opening ceremony, the closing ceremony was staged for $500,000.

The headline act was Cuban-American Gloria Estefan and her band, Miami Sound Machine, which was selected, according to the organizing committee, because her album Let It Loose had just achieved platinum sales. The choice of Castro-critic Estefan, who had fled with her family during the Cuban Revolution while her father stayed behind and was imprisoned, led the Cuban delegation to again threaten the boycott. In the end, they attended the closing ceremony, but returned to the stands and sat during the dancing. The ceremony ended with indoor fireworks, and the spectators were invited to exit the building to see a 25-minute outdoor fireworks display.

== Impact ==
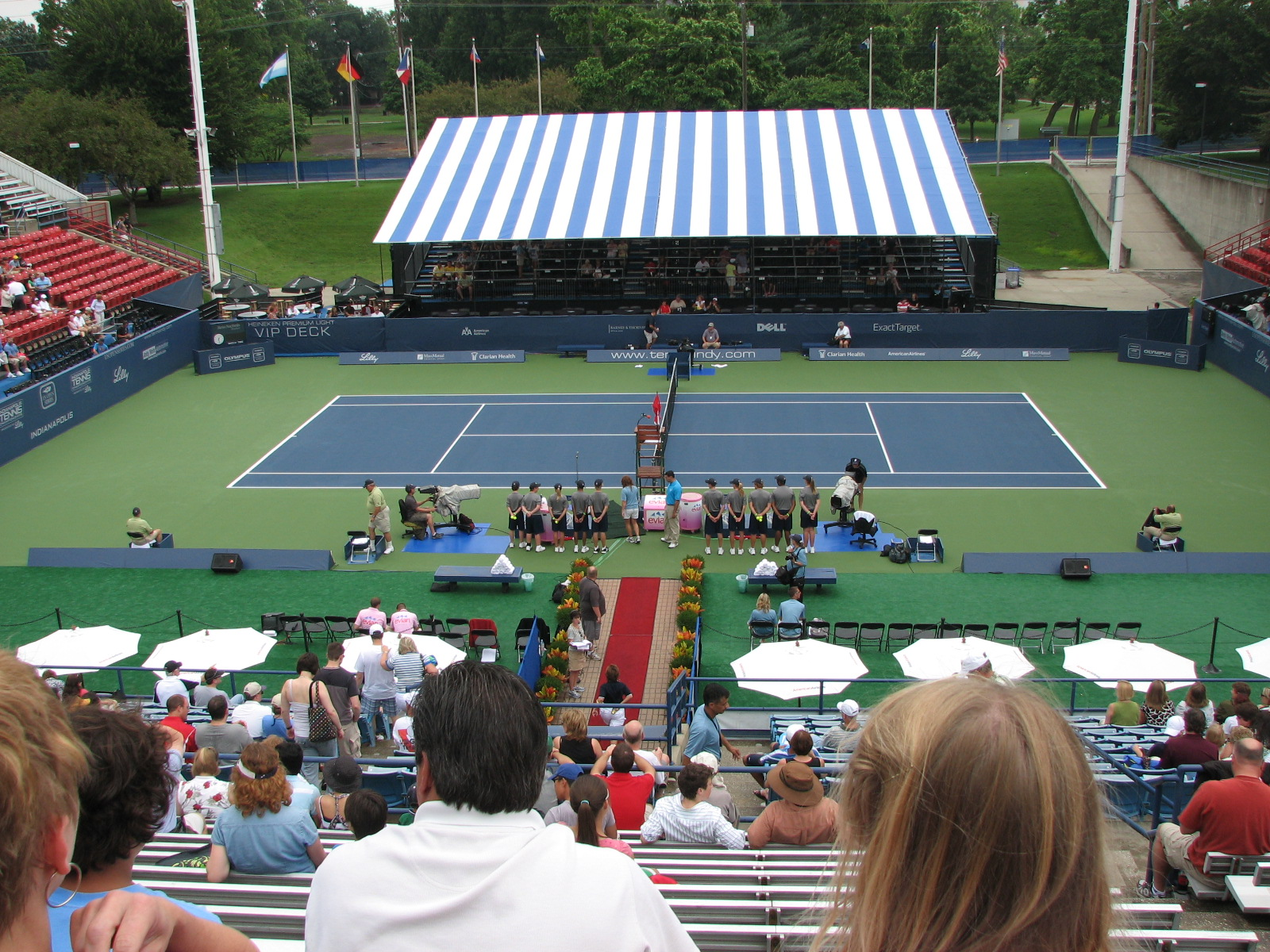
After the Pan Am Games, the Indianapolis Tennis Center became the annual venue for the Indianapolis Tennis Championships

The Pan Am Games brought about $175 million (1988 USD, $355.1 million 2016 USD) to Indianapolis's economy. Hosting the Games cost about $30 million. Indianapolis was the first Pan American Games host city to break even financially.

Hosting the games also attracted many sports organizations to consider Indianapolis as a site for their headquarters, most notably the National Collegiate Athletic Association.

== Bibliography ==
- Bodenhamer, David J. (1994). The Encyclopedia of Indianapolis. Indiana University Press. ISBN 978-0-253-31222-8.
- The Tenth Pan American Games Indianapolis 7–23 August 1983 (PDF). Indianapolis: PAX/Indianapolis, Inc. 1989.

Preceded by Caracas	X Pan American Games; Indianapolis (1987)	Succeeded by Havana
