= 1995 Pan American Games =

12th edition of the Pan American Games

XII Pan American Games
- Host: Mar del Plata, Argentina
- Nations: 42
- Athletes: 5,144
- Events: 309 in 34 sports
- Opening: March 12
- Closing: March 26
- Opened by: President Carlos Menem
- Cauldron lighter: Nora Vega
- Main venue: Estadio José María Minella

The 1995 Pan American Games, officially known as the XII Pan American Games (Spanish: XII Juegos Panamericanos) and commonly known as Mar del Plata 1995, were held in Mar del Plata, Argentina, from 12 to 26 March 1995. After 44 years, this was the Pan American Games' first return to the country that hosted the first Games, in 1951.

== Overview ==
The seaside resort city of Mar del Plata hosted the XII Pan American Games. The city of 600,000 is located 400 km south of Buenos Aires. Welcoming 5,144 athletes from 42 countries of PASO community, events were held in 34 different sports. The Games were held early by Northern Hemisphere standards, but at the end of summer in the Southern Hemisphere.

Organizers spread the 1995 games throughout Argentina, including Buenos Aires, Parana, and Mar del Plata.

== Bidding process ==
Only Mar del Plata submitted a bid to host the 1995 Pan American Games that was recognized by the Pan American Sports Organization (OPEPA). Honoring an agreement that was made after Mar del Plata withdrew their bid for the 1991 Pan American Games, OPEPA selected Mar del Plata as the host city for the 1995 games at their General Assembly in Havana, Cuba in October 1989.

== Venues ==
=== Mar del Plata ===
- Estadio José María Minella: Opening and closing ceremonies, Football
- Justo Román Athletic stadium: Athletics
- Polideportivo Islas Malvinas: Basketball, Volleyball
- Municipal Velodrome: Cycling
- Pan American Field Hockey Stadium: Field Hockey
- Alberto Zorrilla Natatorium: Swimming
- Patinódromo Municipal: Roller sports (skating)
- Laguna de los Padres: Rowing, Canoeing

=== Buenos Aires ===
- CeNARD: Badminton

== Mascot and logo ==
Lobi, mascot of the games

The mascot, Lobi, is a sea lion, an animal commonly found in the waters of Mar de Plata. He stands for the host city and is displayed with welcoming open arms. The words in the poster are constructed to imply a launching point or podium.

== Medal count ==
| ^{1} | Host nation |

To sort this table by nation, total medal count, or any other column, click on the icon next to the column title.

| Rank | Nation | Gold | Silver | Bronze | Total |
|---|---|---|---|---|---|
| 1 | United States ^{a} | 170 | 145 | 110 | 425 |
| 2 | Cuba | 112 | 66 | 60 | 238 |
| 3 | Canada | 47 | 61 | 69 | 177 |
| 4 | Argentina ^{1} | 40 | 45 | 74 | 159 |
| 5 | Mexico | 23 | 20 | 37 | 80 |

Note

The medal count for the United States is disputed.

== Sports ==
- Archery
- Athletics
- Badminton
- Baseball
- Basketball
- Basque pelota
- Bowling
- Boxing
- Canoeing
- Cycling
- Diving
- Equestrian
- Fencing
- Field Hockey
- Football
- Gymnastics (artistic)
- Gymnastics (rhythmic)
- Handball
- Judo
- Karate
- Racquetball
- Roller sports (skating)
- Roller sports (hockey)
- Rowing
- Sailing
- Shooting
- Softball
- Squash
- Swimming
- Synchronized swimming
- Table tennis
- Taekwondo
- Tennis
- Triathlon
- Volleyball
- Water polo
- Water skiing
- Weightlifting
- Wrestling

The sports of basque pelota, karate, racquetball, squash, triathlon and water skiing appeared on the schedule for the first time.

| Preceded by Havana | XII Pan American Games; Mar del Plata (1995) | Succeeded by Winnipeg |
