= Boxing at the 1988 Summer Olympics – Light welterweight =

Olympic boxing tournament

Light welterweight boxing at the Games of the XXIV Olympiad
- Venue: Jamsil Students' Gymnasium
- Dates: 19 September – 2 October 1988
- Competitors: 45 from 45 nations

Medalists
1st place, gold medalist(s)		Vyacheslav Yanovski	Soviet Union
2nd place, silver medalist(s)		Grahame Cheney	Australia
3rd place, bronze medalist(s)		Lars Myrberg	Sweden
3rd place, bronze medalist(s)		Reiner Gies	West Germany

The men's light welterweight event was part of the boxing programme at the 1988 Summer Olympics. The weight class allowed boxers of up to 63.5 kilograms to compete. The competition was held from 19 September to 2 October 1988. 45 boxers from 45 nations competed. 31-year-old Vyacheslav Yanovskiy won the gold medal.

== Medalists ==
Gold	Vyacheslav Yanovski; Soviet Union
Silver	Grahame Cheney; Australia
Bronze	Lars Myrberg; Sweden
Bronze	Reiner Gies; West Germany

== Results ==
The following boxers took part in the event:

Rank	Name	Country
1	Vyacheslav Yanovski	Soviet Union
2	Grahame Cheney	Australia
3T	Lars Myrberg	Sweden
3T	Reiner Gies	West Germany
5T	Todd Foster	United States
5T	Humberto Rodríguez	Mexico
5T	Anthony Mwamba	Zambia
5T	Sodnomdarjaagiin Altansükh	Mongolia
9T	Ike Quartey	Ghana
9T	Jeon Jin-cheol	South Korea
9T	Duke Chinyadza	Zimbabwe
9T	Howard Grant	Canada
9T	Ludovic Proto	France
9T	Lyton Mphande	Malawi
9T	Adrian Carew-Dodson	Guyana
9T	David Kamau	Kenya
17T	Miguel González	Paraguay
17T	José Saizozema	Dominican Republic
17T	Liasu Braimoh	Nigeria
17T	Andrzej Możdżeń	Poland
17T	Apete Temo	Fiji
17T	Andreas Otto	East Germany
17T	Ahmad Mayez Khanji	Syria
17T	Mark Elliott	Great Britain
17T	Rashi Ali Hadj Matumla	Tanzania
17T	Khalid Rahilou	Morocco
17T	Anoumou Aguiar	Togo
17T	Vukašin Dobrašinović	Yugoslavia
17T	Lóránt Szabó	Hungary
17T	Martin N'Dongo Ebanga	Cameroon
17T	Dan Odindo	Uganda
32T	Handhal Mohamed Al-Harithy	Oman
32T	Tomás Ruiz	Spain
32T	Søren Søndergaard	Denmark
32T	Kouassi Kouassi	Ivory Coast
32T	Jhapat Singh Bhujel	Nepal
32T	Avaavau Avaavau	Western Samoa
32T	Kunihiro Miura	Japan
32T	Jonas Bade	Papua New Guinea
32T	Borislav Abadzhiev	Bulgaria
32T	Bilal El-Masri	Lebanon
32T	Víctor Pérez	Puerto Rico
32T	Abidnasir Shabab	Jordan
32T	Hubert Wester	Aruba
32T	Pravit Suwanwichit	Thailand

=== First round ===
- Lars Myrberg (SWE) def. Handhal al-Harithy (OMA), RSC-1
- Ludovic Proto (FRA) def. Mpuco Makama (SUA), walk-over
- Mark Elliott (GBR) def. Tomas Ruíz (ESP), 5:0
- Vyacheslav Yanovskiy (URS) def. Søren Søndergaard (DEN), RSC-2
- Rashi Ali Hadj Matumla (TNZ) def. Dieudonne Kouassi (IVC), RSC-1
- Lyton Mphande (MLW) def. Ihapat Singh Bhujel (NEP), 5:0
- Khalid Rahilou (MAR) def. Avaavau Avaavau (SAM), RSC-3
- Anthony Mwamba (ZAM) def. Kunihiro Miura (JPN), 5:0
- Anoumou Aguiar (TOG) def. Jonas Bade (PNG), DSQ-2
- Vukašin Dobrašinović (YUG) def. Borislav Abadzhiev (BUL), 3:2
- Adrian Carew (GUY) def. Bilal el-Masri (LIB), 5:0
- Lórant Szabó (HUN) def. Víctor Pérez (PUR), 3:2
- Reiner Gies (FRG) def. Basil Maelagi (SIS), walk-over
- David Kamau (KEN) def. Abidnasir Shahab (JRD), RSC-1
- Martin Ndongo-Ebanga (CMR) def. Hubert Wester (ARU), RSC-1
- Sodnomdarjaagiin Altansükh (MGL) def. Pravit Suwanwichit (THA), 3:2
- Dan Odindo (UGA) def. Desiré Ollo (GAB), walk-over

=== Second round ===
- Grahame Cheney (AUS) def. Miguel González (PAR), RSC-2
- Ike Quartey (GHA) def. José Saizozema (DOM), 5:0
- Todd Foster (USA) def. Khalid Rahilou (MAR), KO-2
- Chun Jil-Chun (KOR) def. Liasu Braimoh (NGA), RSC-3
- Duke Chinyadza (ZIM) def. Andrzej Możdżeń (POL), 3:2
- Humberto Rodriguez (MEX) def. Apete Temo (FIJ), RSC-2
- Howard Grant (CAN) def. Andreas Otto (GDR), RSC-1
- Lars Myrberg (SWE) def. Ahmed Khanji (SYR), 4:1
- Ludovic Proto (FRA) def. Mark Elliott (GBR), RSC-1
- Vyacheslav Yanovskiy (URS) def. Rashid Matumla (TNZ), RSC-3
- Anthony Mwamba (ZAM) def. Anoumou Aguiar (TOG), RSC-1
- Adrian Carew (GUY) def. Vukašin Dobrašinović (YUG), 4:1
- Reiner Gies (FRG) def. Lórant Szabó (HUN), 5:0
- David Kamau (KEN) def. Martin Ndongo-Ebanga (CMR), 5:0
- Sodnomdarjaagiin Altansükh (MGL) def. Dan Odindo (UGA), RSC-2

=== Third round ===
- Grahame Cheney (AUS) def. Ike Quartey (GHA), 5:0
- Todd Foster (USA) def. Chun Jil-Chun (KOR), KO-2
- Humberto Rodriguez (MEX) def. Duke Chinyadza (ZIM), KO-1
- Lars Myrberg (SWE) def. Howard Grant (CAN), 4:1
- Vyacheslav Yanovskiy (URS) def. Ludovic Proto (FRA), 5:0
- Anthony Mwamba (ZAM) def. Lyton Mphande (MLW), KO-2
- Reiner Gies (FRG) def. Adrian Carew (GUY), 3:2
- Sodnomdarjaagiin Altansükh (MGL) def. David Kamau (KEN), 5:0

=== Quarterfinals ===
- Grahame Cheney (AUS) def. Todd Foster (USA), 3:2
- Lars Myrberg (SWE) def. Humberto Rodriguez (MEX), KO-1
- Vyacheslav Yanovskiy (URS) def. Anthony Mwamba (ZAM), 5:0
- Reiner Gies (FRG) def. Sodnomdarjaagiin Altansükh (MGL), 4:1

=== Semifinals ===
- Grahame Cheney (AUS) def. Lars Myrberg (SWE), 5:0
- Vyacheslav Yanovskiy (URS) def. Reiner Gies (FRG), KO-1

=== Final ===
- Vyacheslav Yanovskiy (URS) def. Grahame Cheney (AUS), 5:0
