= Weightlifting at the 1990 Central American and Caribbean Games =

- Location: Mexico City
- Dates: November

The weightlifting competition at the 1990 Central American and Caribbean Games was held in Mexico City, in November.

== Men's medal summary ==
Event		Gold		Silver		Bronze	
52 kg	Snatch	Humberto Fuentes (VEN)	102.5 kg	Juan Tavera (CUB)	97.5 kg	Javier Suárez (VEN)	97.5 kg
52 kg	Clean and jerk	Juan Tavera (CUB)	127.5 kg	Humberto Fuentes (VEN)	125.0 kg	Javier Suárez (VEN)	125.0 kg
52 kg	Total	Humberto Fuentes (VEN)	227.5 kg	Juan Tavera (CUB)	225.0 kg	Javier Suárez (VEN)	222.5 kg
56 kg	Snatch	William Vargas (CUB)	115.0 kg GR	Josué Farfán (VEN)	107.5 kg	José Horacio Villegas (COL)	107.5 kg
56 kg	Clean and jerk	William Vargas (CUB)	140.0 kg	Josué Farfán (VEN)	130.0 kg	José Horacio Villegas (COL)	130.0 kg
56 kg	Total	William Vargas (CUB)	255.0 kg GR	Josué Farfán (VEN)	237.5 kg	José Horacio Villegas (COL)	237.5 kg
60 kg	Snatch	Luis Rosario (DOM)	115.0 kg	Matilde Ceballos (PAN)	112.5 kg	Juan Manuel Cueto (DOM)	110.0 kg
60 kg	Clean and jerk	John Salazar (COL)	140.0 kg	Santiago Amador (CUB)	140.0 kg	Juan Manuel Cueto (DOM)	132.5 kg
60 kg	Total	John Salazar (COL)	250.0 kg	Santiago Amador (CUB)	250.0 kg	Matilde Ceballos (PAN)	245.0 kg
67.5 kg	Snatch	Víctor Echevarría (CUB)	137.5 kg GR	Eyne Acevedo (COL)	127.5 kg	Tómas Rodríguez (PAN)	125.0 kg
67.5 kg	Clean and jerk	Víctor Echevarría (CUB)	167.5 kg GR	Eyne Acevedo (COL)	165.0 kg	Iván Batista (PAN)	162.5 kg
67.5 kg	Total	Víctor Echevarría (CUB)	305.0 kg GR	Eyne Acevedo (COL)	292.5 kg	Iván Batista (PAN)	287.5 kg
75 kg	Snatch	Álvaro Velasco (COL)	140.0 kg	Raúl Mora (CUB)	135.0 kg	Arnold Franqui (PUR)	132.5 kg
75 kg	Clean and jerk	Raúl Mora (CUB)	180.0 kg	Álvaro Velasco (COL)	172.5 kg	Jorge Kassar (VEN)	165.0 kg
75 kg	Total	Raúl Mora (CUB)	315.0 kg	Álvaro Velasco (COL)	312.5 kg	Jorge Kassar (VEN)	295.0 kg
82.5 kg	Snatch	Lino Elias (CUB)	155.0 kg	Julio Luna (VEN)	140.0 kg	Luis Mejías (COL)	137.5 kg
82.5 kg	Clean and jerk	Lino Elias (CUB)	185.0 kg	Luis Mejías (COL)	180.0 kg	Julio Luna (VEN)	175.0 kg
82.5 kg	Total	Lino Elias (CUB)	340.0 kg	Luis Mejías (COL)	317.5 kg	Julio Luna (VEN)	315.0 kg
90 kg	Snatch	José Heredia (CUB)	160.0 kg	William Letriz (PUR)	140.0 kg	David Muñoz (MEX)	137.5 kg
90 kg	Clean and jerk	José Heredia (CUB)	200.0 kg	Cruz Pérez (VEN)	170.0 kg	William Letriz (PUR)	170.0 kg
90 kg	Total	José Heredia (CUB)	360.0 kg	William Letriz (PUR)	310.0 kg	Cruz Pérez (VEN)	302.5 kg
100 kg	Snatch	Omar Semanat (CUB)	155.0 kg	Pedro Marin (VEN)	137.5 kg	Víctor Ruiz (MEX)	137.5 kg
100 kg	Clean and jerk	Omar Semanat (CUB)	205.0 kg	Pedro Marin (VEN)	170.0 kg	Víctor Ruiz (MEX)	170.0 kg
100 kg	Total	Omar Semanat (CUB)	360.0 kg	Pedro Marin (VEN)	307.5 kg	Víctor Ruiz (MEX)	307.5 kg
110 kg	Snatch	Maurys Charón (CUB)	167.5 kg	Jesús Lezama (VEN)	135.0 kg	Delfín Rentería (COL)	135.0 kg
110 kg	Clean and jerk	Maurys Charón (CUB)	200.0 kg	Pedro Figueroa (VEN)	167.5 kg	Guillermo Guzmán (MEX)	165.0 kg
110 kg	Total	Maurys Charón (CUB)	367.5 kg	Delfín Rentería (COL)	300.0 kg	Guillermo Guzmán (MEX)	297.5 kg
+110 kg	Snatch	Nelson Velázquez (CUB)	175.0 kg	José Roque (PUR)	150.0 kg	Juan Mejía (DOM)	127.5 kg
+110 kg	Clean and jerk	Nelson Velázquez (CUB)	210.0 kg	José Roque (PUR)	182.5 kg	Antonio Sánchez (MEX)	160.0 kg
+110 kg	Total	Nelson Velázquez (CUB)	385.0 kg	José Roque (PUR)	332.5 kg	Antonio Sánchez (MEX)	285.0 kg

== Medal table ==
Ranking by Big (Total result) medals

* Host nation (Mexico)

Rank	Nation	Gold	Silver	Bronze	Total
1	Cuba	8	2	0	10
2	Colombia	1	4	1	6
3	Venezuela	1	2	4	7
4	Puerto Rico	0	2	0	2
5	Mexico*	0	0	3	3
6	Panama	0	0	2	2
Totals (6 entries)		10	10	10	30

Ranking by all medals: Big (Total result) and Small (Snatch and clean and jerk)

* Host nation (Mexico)

Rank	Nation	Gold	Silver	Bronze	Total
1	Cuba	24	5	0	29
2	Colombia	3	8	5	16
3	Venezuela (VEN)	2	11	8	21
4	Dominican Republic	1	0	3	4
5	Puerto Rico (PUR)	0	5	2	7
6	Panama	0	1	4	5
7	Mexico*	0	0	8	8
Totals (7 entries)		30	30	30	90
