= Weightlifting at the 1986 Central American and Caribbean Games =

- Location: (Dominican Republic) Santiago de los Caballeros
- Dates: June–July

The weightlifting competition at the 1986 Central American and Caribbean Games was held in Santiago de los Caballeros, in June and July.

== Medal summary ==
=== Men's events ===
Event		Gold		Silver		Bronze	
52 kg	Snatch	Juan A. Hernández (CUB)	102.5 kg	Humberto Fuentes (VEN)	100.0 kg	Tolentino Murillo (COL)	90.0 kg
52 kg	Clean & Jerk	Humberto Fuentes (VEN)	130.0 kg	Juan A. Hernández (CUB)	127.5 kg	Alberto Ortíz (PUR)	115.0 kg
52 kg	Total	Humberto Fuentes (VEN)	230.0 kg	Juan A. Hernández (CUB)	230.0 kg	Alberto Ortíz (PUR)	202.5 kg
56 kg	Snatch	Julio Guerrero (CUB)	105.0 kg	Cristian Rivera (DOM)	100.0 kg	Nicolas Mercado (COL)	100.0 kg
56 kg	Clean & Jerk	Julio Guerrero (CUB)	140.0 kg	José Díaz (PAN)	130.0 kg	Carlos David (COL)	130.0 kg
56 kg	Total	Julio Guerrero (CUB)	245.0 kg	Cristian Rivera (DOM)	225.0 kg	José Díaz (PAN); Nicolas Mercado (COL)	225.0 kg
60 kg	Snatch	Daniel Núñez (CUB)	125.0 kg	Tómas Rodríguez (PAN)	107.5 kg	Matilde Ceballos (PAN)	107.5 kg
60 kg	Clean & Jerk	Daniel Núñez (CUB)	155.0 kg	Héctor Domínguez (DOM)	140.0 kg	Tómas Rodríguez (PAN)	137.5 kg
60 kg	Total	Daniel Núñez (CUB)	280.0 kg	Tómas Rodríguez (PAN)	245.0 kg	Matilde Ceballos (PAN); Héctor Domínguez (DOM)	240.0 kg
67.5 kg	Snatch	Víctor Echevarría (CUB)	125.0 kg	José Orellana (VEN)	120.0 kg	Máximo Martínez (DOM)	117.5 kg
67.5 kg	Clean & Jerk	Víctor Echevarría (CUB)	165.0 kg	Máximo Martínez (DOM)	162.5 kg	Jorge Kassar (VEN)	152.5 kg
67.5 kg	Total	Víctor Echevarría (CUB)	290.0 kg	Máximo Martínez (DOM)	280.0 kg	José Orellana (VEN)	267.5 kg
75 kg	Snatch	Nelson Caraballo (CUB)	150.0 kg GR	Gilberto Mercado (COL)	135.0 kg	Frank Cepeda (DOM)	130.0 kg
75 kg	Clean & Jerk	Nelson Caraballo (CUB)	190.0 kg	Ricardo Salas (PAN)	165.0 kg	Gilberto Mercado (COL)	160.0 kg
75 kg	Total	Nelson Caraballo (CUB)	340.0 kg	Gilberto Mercado (COL)	295.0 kg	Ricardo Salas (PAN)	295.0 kg
82.5 kg	Snatch	Enrique Sabarit (CUB)	162.5 kg GR	Ángel Bernald (DOM)	140.0 kg	William Letriz (PUR)	137.5 kg
82.5 kg	Clean & Jerk	Enrique Sabarit (CUB)	210.0 kg GR	Pedro Torres (VEN)	170.0 kg	Ángel Bernald (DOM)	162.5 kg
82.5 kg	Total	Enrique Sabarit (CUB)	372.5 kg GR	Ángel Bernald (DOM)	302.5 kg	William Letriz (PUR)	300.0 kg
90 kg	Snatch	Francisco Ferreira (CUB)	175.0 kg GR	Roberto López (DOM)	132.5 kg	Javier Jiménez (COL)	130.0 kg
90 kg	Clean & Jerk	Francisco Ferreira (CUB)	200.0 kg	Luis Piñate (VEN)	172.5 kg	Javier Jiménez (COL)	170.0 kg
90 kg	Total	Francisco Ferreira (CUB)	375.0 kg	Luis Piñate (VEN)	300.0 kg	Javier Jiménez (COL)	300.0 kg
100 kg	Snatch	Ciro Ibáñez (CUB)	155.0 kg	Víctor Ruiz (MEX)	135.0 kg	William Echezuria (VEN)	135.0 kg
100 kg	Clean & Jerk	Ciro Ibáñez (CUB)	190.0 kg	William Echezuria (VEN)	170.0 kg	Víctor Ruiz (MEX)	165.0 kg
100 kg	Total	Ciro Ibáñez (CUB)	345.0 kg	William Echezuria (VEN)	305.0 kg	Víctor Ruiz (MEX)	300.0 kg
110 kg	Snatch	René González (CUB)	157.5 kg	Jesús Lezama (VEN)	130.0 kg	Wilberto Torres (PUR)	122.5 kg
110 kg	Clean & Jerk	René González (CUB)	207.5 kg	Jesús Lezama (VEN)	155.0 kg	Wilberto Torres (PUR)	150.0 kg
110 kg	Total	René González (CUB)	365.0 kg	Jesús Lezama (VEN)	285.0 kg	Wilberto Torres (PUR)	272.5 kg
+110 kg	Snatch	Reynaldo Chávez (CUB)	167.5 kg	Calvin Stamp (JAM)	145.0 kg	Douglas Uribarri (VEN)	130.0 kg
+110 kg	Clean & Jerk	Reynaldo Chávez (CUB)	195.0 kg	Calvin Stamp (JAM)	175.0 kg	Douglas Uribarri (VEN)	165.0 kg
+110 kg	Total	Reynaldo Chávez (CUB)	362.5 kg	Calvin Stamp (JAM)	320.0 kg	Douglas Uribarri (VEN)	295.0 kg

== Medal table ==
Ranking by Big (Total result) medals

* Host nation (Dominican Republic)

Rank	Nation	Gold	Silver	Bronze	Total
1	Cuba	9	1	0	10
2	Venezuela	1	3	2	6
3	Dominican Republic*	0	3	1	4
4	Panama	0	1	3	4
5	Colombia	0	1	2	3
6	Jamaica	0	1	0	1
7	Puerto Rico	0	0	3	3
8	Mexico	0	0	1	1
Totals (8 entries)		10	10	12	32

Ranking by all medals: Big (Total result) and Small (Snatch and Clean & Jerk)

* Host nation (Dominican Republic)

Rank	Nation	Gold	Silver	Bronze	Total
1	Cuba	28	2	0	30
2	Venezuela (VEN)	2	10	6	18
3	Dominican Republic*	0	8	4	12
4	Panama	0	4	5	9
5	Jamaica	0	3	0	3
6	Colombia	0	2	8	10
7	Mexico	0	1	2	3
8	Puerto Rico (PUR)	0	0	7	7
Totals (8 entries)		30	30	32	92
