= Boxing at the 1984 Summer Olympics – Lightweight =

Olympic boxing tournament

Lightweight boxing at the Games of the XXIII Olympiad
- Venue: Los Angeles Memorial Sports Arena
- Dates: 29 July – 11 August 1984
- Competitors: 40 from 40 nations

Medalists
1st place, gold medalist(s)		Pernell Whitaker	United States
2nd place, silver medalist(s)		Luis Ortiz	Puerto Rico
3rd place, bronze medalist(s)		Chun Chil-sung	South Korea
3rd place, bronze medalist(s)		Martin Ndongo-Ebanga	Cameroon

The men's lightweight event was part of the boxing programme at the 1984 Summer Olympics. The weight class allowed boxers of up to 60 kilograms to compete. The competition was held from 29 July to 11 August 1984. 40 boxers from 40 nations competed.

== Medalists ==
Gold	Pernell Whitaker; United States
Silver	Luis Ortiz; Puerto Rico
Bronze	Chun Chil-sung; South Korea
Bronze	Martin Ndongo-Ebanga; Cameroon

== Results ==
The following boxers took part in the event:

Rank	Name	Country
1	Pernell Whitaker	United States
2	Luis Ortiz	Puerto Rico
3T	Chun Chil-sung	South Korea
3T	Martin Ndongo-Ebanga	Cameroon
5T	José Antonio Hernando	Spain
5T	Fahri Sümer	Turkey
5T	Reiner Gies	West Germany
5T	Leopoldo Cantancio	Philippines
9T	Douglas Odame	Ghana
9T	Alex Dickson	Great Britain
9T	Gordon Carew	Guyana
9T	Jaineck Chinyanta	Zambia
9T	Geofrey Nyeko	Uganda
9T	John Kalbhenn	Canada
9T	Christopher Ossai	Nigeria
9T	Renato Cornett	Australia
17T	Jean-Claude Labonte	Seychelles
17T	Dieudonné Kossi	Central African Republic
17T	Buala Sasakul	Thailand
17T	Desiré Ollo	Gabon
17T	André Kimbu Mboma	Zaire
17T	Shadrach Odhiambo	Sweden
17T	Bakary Fofana	Ivory Coast
17T	Emrol Phillip	Grenada
17T	Ama Sodogah	Togo
17T	Omar Méndez	Nicaragua
17T	Samir Khenyab	Iraq
17T	Milson Randrianasolo	Madagascar
17T	Ángel Beltré	Dominican Republic
17T	Asif Kamran Dar	Pakistan
17T	Slobodan Pavlović	Yugoslavia
17T	Hernán Gutiérrez	Colombia
33T	Latt Zaw	Burma
33T	Dalbahadur Ranamagar	Nepal
33T	Solomon Kondowe	Malawi
33T	Shlomo Niazov	Israel
33T	Patrick Waweru	Kenya
33T	Luciano Solis	Mexico
33T	Viorel Ioana	Romania
33T	Mustapha Fadli	Morocco

=== First round ===
- Christopher Ossai (NGR) def. Zan Latt (BUR), 5:0
- Angel Beltre (DOM) def. Dal Ranamagar (NEP), 5:0
- Leopoldo Cantancio (PHI) def. Solomon Kondowa (MLW), 5:0
- Asif Dar (PAK) def. Shlomo Niazov (ISR), 5:0
- Chun Chil-Sung (KOR) def. Patrick Waweru (KEN), 3:2
- Slobodan Pavlović (YUG) def. Luciano Solis (MEX), 3:2
- Renato Cornett (AUS) def. Viorel Ioana (ROU), 4:1
- Hernán Guttierez (COL) def. Mustafa Fadli (MAR), 5:0

=== Second round ===
- José Antonio Hernando (ESP) def. Jean-Claude Labonte (SEY), 5:0
- Douglas Odame (GHA) def. Dieudonne Kossi (RCA), RSC-3
- Luis Ortiz (PUR) def. Buala Sakul (THA), KO-2
- Alex Dickson (GBR) def. Desire Ollo (GAB), 5:0
- Gordon Carew (GUY) def. André Kimbu Mboma (ZAI), 5:0
- Martin N'Dongo (CMR) def. Shadrah Odhiambo (SWE), RSC-2
- Fahri Sumer (TUR) def. Bakary Fofana (IVC), 5:0
- Jaineck Chinyanta (ZAM) def. Errol Phillip (GRN), RSC-2
- Geoffrey Nyeko (UGA) def. Ama Sodogah (TOG), 5:0
- Pernell Whitaker (USA) def. Adolfo Mendez (NIC), 5:0
- Reiner Gies (FRG) def. Samir Khenyab (IRQ), 4:1
- John Kalbhenn (CAN) def. Wilson Randrinasolo (MDG), RSC-1
- Christopher Ossai (NGR) def. Angel Beltre (DOM), RSC-2
- Leopoldo Cantancio (PHI) def. Asif Dar (PAK), 5:0
- Chun Chil-Sung (KOR) def. Slobodan Pavlović (YUG), 4:1
- Renato Cornett (AUS) def. Hernán Guttierez (COL), 5:0

=== Third round ===
- José Antonio Hernando (ESP) def. Douglas Odame (GHA), 5:0
- Luis Ortiz (PUR) def. Alex Dickson (GBR), KO-2
- Martin N'Dongo (CMR) def. Gordon Carew (GUY), KO-2
- Fahri Sumer (TUR) def. Jaineck Chinyanta (ZAM), 5:0
- Pernell Whitaker (USA) def. Geoffrey Nyeko (UGA), 5:0
- Reiner Gies (FRG) def. John Kalbhenn (CAN), 5:0
- Leopoldo Cantancio (PHI) def. Christopher Ossai (NGR), 5:0
- Chun Chil-Sung (KOR) def. Renato Cornett (AUS), 4:1

=== Quarterfinals ===
- Luis Ortiz (PUR) def. José Antonio Hernando (ESP), 5:0
- Martin N'Dongo (CMR) def. Fahri Sumer (TUR), 4:1
- Pernell Whitaker (USA) def. Reiner Gies (FRG), 5:0
- Chun Chil-Sung (KOR) def. Leopoldo Cantancio (PHI), RSC-3

=== Semifinals ===
- Luis Ortiz (PUR) def. Martin N'Dongo (CMR), 3:2
- Pernell Whitaker (USA) def. Chun Chil-Sung (KOR), 5:0

=== Final ===
- Pernell Whitaker (USA) def. Luis Ortiz (PUR), AB-2
