= Weightlifting at the 1987 Pan American Games =

Weightlifting was one of the sports contested at the 1987 Pan American Games in Indianapolis in Indiana, United States. There were ten weight categories, just as there were in the previous two games, with medals awarded in each.

== Men's competition ==
=== Flyweight (– 52 kg) ===
RANK	FINAL
Gold medal	Juan Hernández (CUB)
Silver medal	Humberto Fuentes (VEN)
Bronze medal	Jose Farfán (VEN)

=== Bantamweight (– 56 kg) ===
RANK	FINAL
Gold medal	Pedro Negrín (CUB)
Silver medal	Tolentino Murillo (COL)
Bronze medal	Christian Rivera (DOM)

=== Featherweight (– 60 kg) ===
RANK	FINAL
Gold medal	Gabriel Enseñat (CUB)
Gold medal	Julio Loscos (CUB)
Bronze medal	Gilles Desmarais (CAN)

=== Lightweight (– 67.5 kg) ===
RANK	FINAL
Gold medal	Raúl Mora Licea (CUB)
Silver medal	Víctor Echevarría (CUB)
Bronze medal	Langis Côté (CAN)

=== Middleweight (– 75 kg) ===
RANK	FINAL
Gold medal	Pablo Lara Rodríguez (CUB)
Silver medal	Francisco Alleguez (CUB)
Bronze medal	Roberto Urrutia (USA)
4.	Jorge Kassar (VEN)
5.	Arnold Franqui (PUR)
6.	Louis Payer (CAN)
7.	Pablo Gomez (URU)
8.	Ricardo Salas (PAN)
9.	Fran Pérez (DOM)

=== Light-heavyweight (– 82.5 kg) ===
RANK	FINAL
Gold medal	Pedro Rodriguez (CUB)
Silver medal	William Letriz (PUR)
Bronze medal	Guy Greavette (CAN)
4.	Glen Dodds (CAN)
5.	Juan Rojas (PER)
6.	Pedro Torres (VEN)
7.	Hugo Garbia (ARG)
8.	Derrick Crass (USA)
9.	Freddy Tabares (COL)
10.	Paul Distant (JAM)

=== Middle-heavyweight (– 90 kg) ===
RANK	FINAL
Gold medal	Omar Semanat (CUB)
Bronze medal	Gill Paramjit (CAN)
Bronze medal	Thomas Calandro (USA)

=== First-heavyweight (– 100 kg) ===
RANK	FINAL
Gold medal	Denis Garon (CAN)
Silver medal	Ken Clark (USA)
Bronze medal	Brett Brian (USA)

=== Heavyweight (– 110 kg) ===
RANK	FINAL
Gold medal	David Bolduc (CAN)
Silver medal	Richard Schutz (USA)
Bronze medal	Robert Jones (USA)

=== Super heavyweight (+ 110 kg) ===
RANK	FINAL
Gold medal	Mario Alvarez Martinez (USA)
Silver medal	John Bergman (USA)
Bronze medal	Calvin Stamp (JAM)

== Medal table ==
Rank	Nation	Gold	Silver	Bronze	Total
1	Cuba	8	2	0	10
2	Canada	2	1	4	7
3	United States	1	3	3	7
4	Venezuela	0	1	1	2
5	Colombia	0	1	0	1
5	Puerto Rico	0	1	0	1
7	Dominican Republic	0	0	1	1
7	Jamaica	0	0	1	1
Totals (8 entries)		11	9	10	30
