= Colombia at the 1984 Summer Olympics =

- IOC code: COL
- NOC: Colombian Olympic Committee

in Los Angeles
- Competitors: 39 (36 men and 3 women) in 8 sports
- Flag bearer: Pablo Restrepo
- Medals Ranked 33rd: Gold 0 Silver 1 Bronze 0 Total 1

Summer Olympics appearances (overview)
- 1932; 1936; 1948; 1952; 1956; 1960; 1964; 1968; 1972; 1976; 1980; 1984; 1988; 1992; 1996; 2000; 2004; 2008; 2012; 2016; 2020; 2024

Colombia was represented at the 1984 Summer Olympics in Los Angeles, California, United States by the Colombian Olympic Committee.

In total, 39 athletes including 36 men and three women represented Colombia in eight different sports including archery, athletics, boxing, cycling, shooting, swimming, weightlifting and wrestling.

Colombia won one medal at the games after Helmut Bellingrodt claimed silver in the shooting men's 50 m running target.

== Background ==
Colombia made their Olympic debut at the 1932 Summer Olympics in Los Angeles, California, United States. Following World War II, the 1952 Summer Olympics in Helsinki, Finland were the only games that Colombia had missed. The 1984 Summer Olympics in Los Angeles, California, United States marked their 11th appearance at the Olympics.

== Competitors ==
In total, 39 athletes represented Colombia at the 1984 Summer Olympics in Los Angeles, California, United States across eight different sports.

Sport	Men	Women	Total
Archery	1	0	1
Athletics	5	0	5
Boxing	5	—	5
Cycling	7	0	7
Shooting	11	3	14
Swimming	1	0	1
Weightlifting	5	—	5
Wrestling	1	—	1
Total	36	3	39

== Medalists ==
Colombia won one medal at the games after Helmut Bellingrodt claimed silver in the shooting men's 50 m running target.

Medal	Name	Sport	Event	Date
Silver	Helmut Bellingrodt	Shooting	Men's 50 metre running target	31 July

== Archery ==
In total, one Colombian athlete participated in the archery events – Juan Echavarria in the men's individual.

== Athletics ==
In total, five Colombian athletes participated in the athletics events – Manuel Ramirez-Caicedo in the men's 200 m, the men's 400 m and the men's 800 m, Domingo Tibaduiza in the men's 10,000 m and the men's marathon, Querubín Moreno in the men's 20 km wace walk and the men's 50 km wace walk and Héctor Moreno and Francisco Vargas in the men's 20 km wace walk.

== Boxing ==
In total, five Colombian athletes participated in the boxing events – Hernán Gutiérrez in the lightweight category, Álvaro Mercado in the flyweight category, Robinsón Pitalúa in the bantamweight category, Francisco Tejedor in the light flyweight category and Rafael Zuñiga in the featherweight category.

== Cycling ==
In total, seven Colombian athletes participated in the cycling events – Rogelio Arango, Carlos Jaramillo, Fabio Parra and Néstor Mora in the men's road race, Hugo Daya in the men's sprint and Balbino Jaramillo and William Palacio in the men's individual pursuit and the men's points race.

== Shooting ==
In total, 14 Colombian athletes participated in the shooting events – Helmut Bellingrodt and Horst Bellingrodt in the shooting men's 50 m running target, German Carrasquilla in the men's 10 m air rifle, Mario Clopatofsky in the men's 50 m rifle three positions, Gustavo García and Alonso Morales in the trap, Alfredo González in the men's 25 m rapid fire pistol, Alejandra Hoyos and Gloria López in the women's 10 m air rifle, Jorge Molina and Carlos Mazo in the skeet, Luis Ortiz in the men's 50 m pistol, Elvira Salazar in the women's 25 m pistol and Bernardo Tovar in the men's 25 m rapid fire pistol and the men's 50 m pistol.

== Swimming ==
In total, one Colombian athlete participated in the swimming events – Pablo Restrepo in the men's 100 m breaststroke, the men's 200 m breaststroke and the men's 200 m individual medley.

== Weightlifting ==
In total, five Colombian athletes participated in the weightlifting events – Gilberto Mercado in the –75 kg, Nicolas Mercado in the –56 kg category, Oscar Palma in the –60 kg category and Oscar Penagos and Antonio Quintana in the –52 kg category.

== Wrestling ==
In total, one Colombian athlete participated in the wrestling events – Romelio Salas in the freestyle –74 kg category and the Greco-Roman –74 kg category.

== See also ==
- Sports in Colombia
