= Weightlifting at the 1988 Summer Olympics – Men's 56 kg =

Weightlifting at the Olympics

Men's 56 kg at the Games of the XXIV Olympiad
- Venue: Olympic Weightlifting Gymnasium
- Date: 19 September 1988
- Competitors: 23 from 17 nations

Medalists
1st place, gold medalist(s)		Oksen Mirzoyan	Soviet Union
2nd place, silver medalist(s)		He Yingqiang	China
3rd place, bronze medalist(s)		Liu Shoubin	China

The men's 56 kg weightlifting event was one of the event at the weightlifting competition of the 1988 Summer Olympics, limiting competitors to a maximum of 56 kilograms of body mass. The competition took place on 19 September, and participants were divided in two groups.

Each lifter performed in both the snatch and clean and jerk lifts, with the final score being the sum of the lifter's best result in each. The athlete received three attempts in each of the two lifts; the score for the lift was the heaviest weight successfully lifted.

Mitko Grablev originally won this category, but he was disqualified after he tested positive for furosemide.

== Results ==
Rank	Athlete	Group	Body weight	Snatch (kg)				Clean & Jerk (kg)				Total
Rank	Athlete	Group	Body weight	1	2	3	Result	1	2	3	Result	Total
1st place, gold medalist(s)	Oksen Mirzoyan (URS)	A	55.75	122.5	127.5	~~130~~	127.5	160	165	~~172.5~~	165	292.5 OR
2nd place, silver medalist(s)	He Yingqiang (CHN)	A	55.65	125	~~130~~	~~130~~	125	150	162.5	~~167.5~~	162.5	287.5
3rd place, bronze medalist(s)	Liu Shoubin (CHN)	A	55.35	~~127.5~~	~~127.5~~	127.5	127.5	140	~~150~~	~~150~~	140	267.5
4	Dirdja Wihardja (INA)	A	55.80	107.5	~~112.5~~	112.5	112.5	137.5	142.5	~~147.5~~	142.5	255
5	Takashi Ichiba (JPN)	B	55.75	107.5	~~112.5~~	~~112.5~~	107.5	137.5	142.5	145	145	252.5
6	Kim Gwi-sik (KOR)	A	55.80	110	~~115~~	~~115~~	110	142.5	~~147.5~~	~~147.5~~	142.5	252.5
7	Joaquin Valle (ESP)	B	55.90	107.5	112.5	~~115~~	112.5	135	~~140~~	~~140~~	135	247.5
8	Giovanni Scarantino (ITA)	A	55.40	110	~~115~~	~~115~~	110	135	~~142.5~~	~~142.5~~	135	245
9	Pascal Arnou (FRA)	B	55.80	100	105	~~107.5~~	105	135	140	~~142.5~~	140	245
10	Azzedine Basbas (ALG)	B	55.95	~~102.5~~	102.5	107.5	107.5	130	137.5	~~140~~	137.5	245
11	José Zurera (ESP)	B	55.15	105	110	~~112.5~~	110	127.5	~~132.5~~	132.5	132.5	242.5
12	Arvo Ojalehto (FIN)	A	55.40	~~105~~	105	~~110~~	105	~~137.5~~	137.5	~~142.5~~	137.5	242.5
13	Samuel Alegada (PHI)	B	56.00	~~107.5~~	107.5	~~112.5~~	107.5	135	~~140~~	~~140~~	135	242.5
14	Toru Hara (JPN)	A	55.55	105	~~110~~	~~110~~	105	135	~~142.5~~	~~142.5~~	135	240
15	Liao Hsing-chou (TPE)	B	55.80	~~105~~	~~105~~	105	105	135	~~142.5~~	~~142.5~~	135	240
16	Laurent Fombertasse (FRA)	B	55.70	~~100~~	100	105	105	132.5	~~137.5~~	~~137.5~~	132.5	237.5
17	Oscar Penagos (COL)	B	55.85	100	105	~~110~~	105	127.5	132.5	~~135~~	132.5	237.5
18	Yon Haryono (INA)	B	55.85	~~100~~	~~100~~	100	100	132.5	137.5	~~140~~	137.5	237.5
19	Jose Diaz (PAN)	B	55.70	95	~~100~~	~~100~~	95	125	~~130~~	~~130~~	125	220
20	Edwin Mata (ECU)	B	55.95	92.5	~~97.5~~	~~97.5~~	92.5	125	~~130~~	~~130~~	125	217.5
—	Cristian Rivera (DOM)	B	55.40	~~105~~	~~105~~	~~107.5~~	—	—	—	—	—	—
—	Tsai Wen-yee (TPE)	A	55.95	~~122.5~~	~~122.5~~	~~122.5~~	—	—	—	—	—	—
—	Mitko Grablev (BUL)	A	55.85	122.5	127.5	130	130	162.5	167.5	~~172.5~~	167.5	~~297.5~~ DQ

== Sources ==
- The Official Report of the Games of the XXIV Olympiad Seoul 1988 Volume Two (PDF) (PDF). p. 642.
