= Weightlifting at the 1983 Pan American Games =

Weightlifting was one of the sports contested at the 1983 Pan American Games in Caracas, Venezuela. There were ten weight categories, just as there were in the 1979 games, with medals awarded in each.

== Men's events ==
Event	Gold	Silver	Bronze
52 kg	Juan Hernández; Cuba	Humberto Fuentes; Venezuela	Ader Rincones; Venezuela
56 kg	Aristóteles Soler; Cuba	José Ramírez; Dominican Republic	Porfirio de León; Puerto Rico
60 kg	Hildemar Rodríguez; Venezuela	Abdel González; Colombia	Ángel García; Dominican Republic
67.5 kg	Julio Loscos; Cuba	Francisco Alleguez; Cuba	Claude Dallaire; Canada
75 kg	Julio Echenique; Cuba	Jacques Demers; Canada	Cal Schake; United States
82.5 kg	Enrique Sabari; Cuba	David Muñoz; Mexico	Gilles Poirier; Canada
90 kg	Ciro Ibáñez; Cuba	Mario Parente; Canada	Jaime Molina; Peru
100 kg	Michael Davis; United States	José Miguel Guzman; Dominican Republic	None
110 kg	Kevin Roy; Canada	Rolando Villamil; Panama	Calvin Stamp; Jamaica
+110 kg	Reynaldo Chávez; Cuba	William Boyd; Jamaica	None

== Medal table ==
Rank	Nation	Gold	Silver	Bronze	Total
1	Cuba	8	1	0	9
2	Canada	1	2	2	5
3	Venezuela	1	1	1	3
4	Dominican Republic	0	2	1	3
5	Jamaica	0	1	1	2
6	Colombia	0	1	0	1
6	Mexico	0	1	0	1
6	Panama	0	1	0	1
9	Peru	0	0	1	1
9	Puerto Rico	0	0	1	1
9	United States	0	0	1	1
Totals (11 entries)		10	10	8	28
