= Chun Chil-sung =

South Korean boxer (born 1961)

Olympic medal record

Men's boxing

Representing South Korea
Bronze medal – third place	1984 Los Angeles	Lightweight

- Chun Chil-sung
- Hangul: 전칠성
- Hanja: 全七星
- RR: Jeon Chilseong
- MR: Chŏn Ch'ilsŏng

Chun Chil-sung (Korean: 전칠성; born July 7, 1961, in Sinan, Jeollanam-do, South Korea) is a retired South Korean boxer.

== Amateur career ==
Chun managed a career record of 100-6 during his amateur career.

In 1983, Chun won the silver medal in lightweight (–60 kg) at the 3rd Boxing World Cup in Rome, Italy. He defeated 1983 European lightweight champion Emil Chuprenski of Bulgaria in the semifinal bout.

Next year, he won the bronze medal in the lightweight division at the 1984 Summer Olympics in Los Angeles, California. In the semifinals he was defeated by eventual winner Pernell Whitaker of the United States by 0-5 unanimous decision, but this is considered one of the controversial pro-American jury decisions in the boxing competitions at the 1984 Olympics.

=== Results ===
1983 Boxing World Cup

Event	Round	Result	Opponent	Score
Lightweight	First	Win	(Italy) Carlo Russolillo	DQ 3
Lightweight	Quarterfinal	Win	(Kenya) James Omondi	5-0
Lightweight	Semifinal	Win	(Bulgaria) Emil Chuprenski	3-2
Lightweight	Final	Loss	(Cuba) Ramon Goire	1-4

1984 Summer Olympics

Event	Round	Result	Opponent	Score
Lightweight	First	Win	(Kenya) Patrick Waweru	3-2
Lightweight	Second	Win	(Socialist Federal Republic of Yugoslavia) Slobodan Pavlović	4-1
Lightweight	Third	Win	(Australia) Renato Cornett	4-1
Lightweight	Quarterfinal	Win	(Philippines) Leopoldo Cantancio	RSC 3
Lightweight	Semifinal	Loss	(United States) Pernell Whitaker	0-5

== Pro career ==
In 1986 Chun turned professional. He was the first South Korean Olympic medalist boxer to turn pro since 1968 Olympic bronze medalist Chang Kyou-chul.

Chun defeated former two-time WBC Super Featherweight champion Rafael Limón in 1989. After going 18–1, he was matched up against Joey Gamache for the WBA Lightweight title in Portland, Maine in 1992, but was defeated by 9-round TKO. After the bout, he retired from boxing.
