= Vyacheslav Yanovskiy =

Belarusian boxer (born 1957)

Medal record

Men's Boxing

Representing the Soviet Union

Olympic Games
Gold medal – first place	1988 Seoul	Light Welterweight

Friendship Games
Silver medal – second place	1984 Havana	Light Welterweight

European Amateur Championships
Silver medal – second place	1987 Turin	Light Welterweight
Bronze medal – third place	1985 Budapest	Light Welterweight

Vyacheslav Evgenevich Yanovskiy (Russian: Вячеслав Евгеньевич Яновский sometimes spelt Viatcheslav Ianovski, born 24 August 1957, in Vitebsk, Belarusian SSR, Soviet Union) is a Belarusian former professional boxer who won a Light Welterweight Gold Medal at the 1988 Summer Olympics for the USSR. He began boxing at the age of 13. In 1988 he became the Honoured Master of Sports of the USSR. During his amateur career he trained at Dynamo in Vitebsk. He won the final gold medal for the USSR in the 1988 Seoul Olympics, and therefore, the final Gold Medal for the USSR ever, as it dissolved three years later.

== 1988 Olympic results ==
- Round of 64: Defeated Søren Søndergaard (Denmark) referee stopped contest in second round
- Round o 32: Defeated Rashid Matumla (Tanzania) referee stopped contest in third round
- Round of 16: Defeated Ludovic Proto (France) on points, 5-0
- Quarterfinal: Defeated Anthony Mwamba (Zambia) on points, 5-0
- Semifinal: Defeated Reiner Gies (West Germany) first-round knockout
- Final: Defeated Grahame Cheney (Australia) on points, 5-0 (won gold medal)

== Pro career ==
Yanovskiy turned professional in 1990 and did not lose in his first 26 fights. In 1995, he was KO'd by journeyman Edwin Murillo and got retired in 1997 with a career record of 30-1-1.
