= José Heredia =

José Heredia may refer to:

- José-Maria de Heredia, Cuban-born French Parnassian poet
- José María Heredia y Heredia, Cuban-born poet
- José Heredia (weightlifter), Cuban weightlifter
