= Søren Søndergaard =

Søren Søndergaard may refer to:

- Søren Søndergaard (politician) (born 1955), Danish politician
- Søren Søndergaard (boxer) (born 1966), Danish boxer
