= Weightlifting at the 1992 Summer Olympics – Men's 60 kg =

Weightlifting at the Olympics

Men's 60 kg at the Games of the XXV Olympiad
- Venue: Pavelló de l'Espanya Industrial
- Date: 28 July 1992
- Competitors: 31 from 26 nations
- Winning total: 320.0 kg

Medalists
1st place, gold medalist(s)		Naim Süleymanoğlu	Turkey
2nd place, silver medalist(s)		Nikolaj Pešalov	Bulgaria
3rd place, bronze medalist(s)		He Yingqiang	China

The Men's Featherweight Weightlifting Event (– 60 kg) is the third-lightest men's event at the Olympic weightlifting competition, limiting competitors to a maximum of 60 kilograms of body mass. The competition took place on 28 July 1992 in the Pavelló de l'Espanya Industrial.

Each lifter performed in both the snatch and clean and jerk lifts, with the final score being the sum of the lifter's best result in each. The athlete received three attempts in each of the two lifts; the score for the lift was the heaviest weight successfully lifted. Ties were broken by the lifter with the lightest body weight.

== Results ==
Rank	Name	Body Weight	Snatch (kg)			Clean & Jerk (kg)			Total (kg)
Rank	Name	Body Weight	1	2	3	1	2	3	Total (kg)
1st place, gold medalist(s)	Naim Süleymanoğlu (TUR)	59.90	142.5	~~153.0~~	~~153.0~~	170.0	177.5	-	320.0
2nd place, silver medalist(s)	Nikolay Peshalov (BUL)	59.35	132.5	~~137.5~~	137.5	~~162.5~~	162.5	167.5	305.0
3rd place, bronze medalist(s)	He Yingqiang (CHN)	59.30	127.5	130.0	~~132.5~~	160.0	165.0	~~170.0~~	295.0
4	Neno Terziiski (BUL)	59.70	125.0	~~130.0~~	130.0	155.0	165.0	~~167.5~~	295.0
5	Valerios Leonidis (GRE)	59.80	125.0	130.0	132.5	162.5	~~167.5~~	~~167.5~~	295.0
6	Ro Hyon-il (PRK)	59.70	122.5	~~127.5~~	127.5	155.0	~~160.0~~	160.0	287.5
7	Attila Czanka (HUN)	59.65	127.5	~~132.5~~	~~135.0~~	157.5	~~160.0~~	~~160.0~~	285.0
8	Li Jae-son (PRK)	59.75	125.0	130.0	~~132.5~~	150.0	~~155.0~~	~~155.0~~	280.0
9	Marcus Stephen (WSM)	59.85	112.5	117.5	~~122.5~~	147.5	152.5	157.5	275.0
10	Paul Toroczcoi (ROU)	59.90	~~120.0~~	120.0	~~125.0~~	150.0	155.0	~~160.0~~	275.0
11	Yosuke Muraki-Iwata (JPN)	59.75	115.0	120.0	~~122.5~~	145.0	~~150.0~~	150.0	270.0
12	Kim Gwi-Sik (KOR)	60.00	~~115.0~~	115.0	~~120.0~~	150.0	155.0	~~157.5~~	270.0
13	Marco Spanehl (GER)	59.70	117.5	~~122.5~~	~~122.5~~	150.0	~~157.5~~	~~157.5~~	267.5
14	Sugiono Katijo (INA)	59.85	110.0	115.0	117.5	145.0	150.0	~~155.0~~	267.5
15	Reuven Hadinatov (ISR)	59.90	122.5	~~127.5~~	~~127.5~~	145.0	~~150.0~~	~~150.0~~	267.5
16	Azzedine Basbas (ALG)	59.95	~~115.0~~	115.0	~~117.5~~	150.0	~~157.5~~	~~157.5~~	265.0
17	David Balp (FRA)	59.50	112.5	117.5	120.0	142.5	~~147.5~~	~~147.5~~	262.5
18	Bryan Jacob (USA)	59.90	117.5	~~122.5~~	~~122.5~~	145.0	~~150.0~~	~~150.0~~	262.5
19	Riadh Khedher (IRQ)	59.95	115.0	~~122.5~~	122.5	140.0	~~150.0~~	~~150.0~~	262.5
20	Kazuo Sato (JPN)	59.80	110.0	115.0	~~120.0~~	140.0	145.0	~~150.0~~	260.0
21	José Horacio Villegas (COL)	59.90	110.0	115.0	117.5	135.0	140.0	~~145.0~~	257.5
22	Sivaraj Naalamuthu Pillai (IND)	59.45	110.0	115.0	~~117.5~~	~~140.0~~	140.0	~~147.5~~	255.0
23	Cecilio Leal (ESP)	59.75	115.0	~~120.0~~	~~120.0~~	140.0	~~145.0~~	~~145.0~~	255.0
24	Gustavo Majauskas (ARG)	59.85	105.0	~~110.0~~	~~110.0~~	140.0	145.0	~~150.0~~	250.0
25	Juan Manuel Cueto (DOM)	59.75	112.5	~~117.5~~	~~117.5~~	135.0	~~140.0~~	~~140.0~~	247.5
26	Marcelo Gandolfo (ARG)	59.85	100.0	107.5	~~112.5~~	130.0	135.0	~~140.0~~	242.5
27	Matilde Ceballos (PAN)	58.80	105.0	110.0	~~115.0~~	125.0	130.0	~~137.5~~	240.0
28	Abdallah Juma (KEN)	59.65	95.0	100.0	~~105.0~~	115.0	~~120.0~~	~~120.0~~	215.0
29	Osman Manzanares (HON)	59.60	~~90.0~~	90.0	92.5	~~110.0~~	110.0	115.0	207.5
30	Harinela Randriamanarivo (MAD)	59.80	80.0	85.0	~~90.0~~	100.0	~~105.0~~	110.0	195.0
31	Roger Berrio (COL)	59.80	115.0	~~120.0~~	~~120.0~~	~~145.0~~	~~145.0~~	-	DNF
