= Jeff Michels =

American weightlifter (born 1961)

Jeffrey ("Jeff") Thomas Michels (born December 29, 1961) was an Olympic weightlifter for the United States. His coach was Steve Gough.

== Career ==
In 1983, after Michels won three gold medals from the Pan American Games, he realized he was roughly two years away from setting world weightlifting records. However, after this competition, Michels tested positive for excessive amounts of testosterone. Because of his use of a banned substance, Michels was stripped of all of his medals that he had earned, suspended by the International Weightlifting Federation, and forbidden by the International Olympic Committee to compete in the 1984 Los Angeles Games.

Michels was one of 19 positive tests at the 1983 Pan American Games in Caracas, where new sophisticated testing procedures were introduced for the first time, in earnest. Michels repudiated his positive test for synthetic testosterone, which before the introduction of the Gas Chromatography-Mass Spectrometry assay, could not be identified in athletes' samples. Curiously, Michels was cleared to compete in the Games after testing clean as part of a pre-screening program conducted by the USOC. After winning the heavyweight competition in Caracas just two days later, Michels was found positive, and was subsequently stripped of his gold medals and sent home from the competition. After a lengthy legal battle, wherein Michels contested the testing procedures and laboratory findings, his ban was upheld, ruling him out of the 1984 Los Angeles Olympics.

Michels' legal case made headlines across the United States, ostensibly because he had several legitimate arguments. For one, the recently ratified Amateur Sports Act of 1978 guaranteed athletes "swift and equitable" resolution of disputes, including the adjudication of doping cases. After testing positive in August 1983 Michels' case dragged on, and had yet to be resolved just weeks before the opening ceremonies in Los Angeles. Michels filed several injunctions in an attempt to qualify for the Games, but was ultimately unsuccessful.

Michels now works for a firm that makes dictation equipment. His testing positive for a banned substance, temporary retirement, and a back injury that prevented him from lifting for 18 months left Michels' body incapable to compete at the highest world-class levels of weight lifting.

== Family ==
Michels is married with one son.

== Weightlifting achievements ==
- Olympic Games team member (1988 & 1992)
- Multiple All-Time Junior American record holder in snatch, clean and jerk, and total
- Multiple Junior and Senior American record holder in snatch and total (1972–1992)
- Senior National Champion (1982, 1983, 1985, 1988–1990)

== See also ==
- List of sportspeople sanctioned for doping offences
