= Możdżeń =

Możdżeń is a Polish surname. Notable people with the surname include:

- Andrzej Możdżeń (born 1962), Polish boxer
- Mateusz Możdżeń (born 1991), Polish footballer
