= Abadzhiev =

Abadzhiev (masculine, Bulgarian: Абаджиев) or Abadzhieva (feminine, Bulgarian: Абаджиева) is a Bulgarian occupational surname, a producer of hodden. Notable people with the surname include:

- Borislav Abadzhiev (born 1963), Bulgarian boxer
- Ivan Abadzhiev (1932–2017), Bulgarian weightlifter
- Stefan Abadzhiev (1934–2024), Bulgarian footballer
