= Puerto Rico at the 1983 Pan American Games =

- IOC code: PUR
- NOC: Puerto Rico Olympic Committee

in Caracas 14–29 August 1983
- Medals Ranked 8th: Gold 2 Silver 7 Bronze 6 Total 15

Pan American Games appearances (overview)
- 1951; 1955; 1959; 1963; 1967; 1971; 1975; 1979; 1983; 1987; 1991; 1995; 1999; 2003; 2007; 2011; 2015; 2019; 2023

The 9th Pan American Games were held in Caracas, Venezuela from August 14 to August 29, 1983.

== Medals ==
=== Gold ===
===== Athletics =====
- Men's Marathon: Jorge González

===== Boxing =====
- Men's Light Flyweight (– 48 kg): Rafael Ramos

=== Silver ===
===== Athletics =====
- Men's Marathon: César Mercado
- Men's 3000 m Steeplechase: Carmelo Ríos

===== Swimming =====
- Men's 100m Freestyle: Fernando Cañales

===== Boxing =====
- Men's Featherweight (– 57 kg): Santos Cardona
- Men's Middleweight (– 75 kg): Alfredo Delgado

===== Tennis =====
- Women's Singles: Gigi Fernández
- Women's Doubles: Gigi Fernández and Marilda Julia

=== Bronze ===
===== Athletics =====
- Men's Javelin: Amado Morales

===== Boxing =====
- Men's Flyweight (– 51 kg): Héctor Ortíz

===== Judo =====
- Men's Open Class: José O. Fuentes

===== Weightlifting =====
- Men's – 56 kg: Porfirio de Léon

===== Wrestling =====
- Men's Greco-Roman – 68 kg: José Betancourt
- Men's Freestyle – 57 kg: Orlando Cáceres

== See also ==
- Puerto Rico at the 1982 Central American and Caribbean Games
- Puerto Rico at the 1984 Summer Olympics
