= Víctor Ruiz =

Víctor Ruiz may refer to:

- Víctor Ruiz (Mexican footballer) (born 1969)
- Víctor Ruiz (footballer, born 1989), Spanish footballer
- Víctor Ruiz (footballer, born 1993), Spanish footballer
- Víctor Ruiz (weightlifter) (born 1957), Mexican Olympic weightlifter
