= Adrian Dodson =

Guyana-British boxer

Personal information
- Nationality: British, Guyanese
- Born: Adrian Dodson; September 20, 1970 (age 56) Georgetown, Guyana
- Height: 5 ft 11 in (1.80 m)
- Weight: Super-middleweight

Boxing career
- Stance: Southpaw

Boxing record
- Total fights: 31
- Wins: 25
- Win by KO: 17
- Losses: 6
- Draws: 0
- No contests: 0

Adrian Dodson, also known as Adrian Carew, (born 20 September 1970) is a British former Olympic boxer. He competed for Guyana at the 1988 Summer Olympics in Seoul under the name Adrian Carew his adopted name, before representing Great Britain at the 1992 Summer Olympics.

== Amateur career ==
Dodson's first Olympic appearance came as a 17-year-old competing in the light welterweight division. He won his first two fights against Bilal el-Masri of Lebanon and Vukašin Dobrašinović of Yugoslavia before losing a disputed 3-2 decision to eventual bronze medallist Reiner Gies of West Germany in the quarter finals.

In 1989, he competed in the 147-pound division of the Golden Gloves and won the Sugar Ray Robinson Award as the outstanding boxer of the tournament.

After moving back to England, he was the ABA welterweight champion in 1990, fighting out of Lynn ABC. He then reverted to his birth name and mother's last name, Dodson, and made his second Olympic appearance competing for Great Britain at the 1992 Games in Barcelona. Due to the presence of Robin Reid in the team Dodson was forced to drop from his favoured light middleweight to the welterweight division in order to compete. He won by KO in the second round against Masashi Kawakami of Japan in the first round of competition, but lost 6-5 decision on the computer scoring in the second round to former World Amateur champion Francisc Vaştag of Romania. Robin Reid went on to win a bronze medal.

== Professional career ==
After turning professional Dodson won his first 18 fights, including winning the vacant WBO super welterweight inter-continental title with a stoppage win against Hughes Daigneault of Canada at the Ulster Hall in Belfast Ireland. He defended that title against Craig Snyder of the USA with an eight round stoppage at the Kings Hall in Belfast Ireland. He defeated former world champion Lloyd Honeyghan in 1995. He lost his first professional fight to Ronald Winky Wright in a world title fight in 1997 but won the IBO World super-middleweight title with a third round ko of Paul Silky Jones in 2001.

In 1999 he was fined £1,000 and banned for 18 months after being found guilty of biting Alain Bonnamie in the last round of their fight for the Commonwealth title with seconds to go and ahead on the scorecards. Dodson appealed this decision and was back in the ring August 2000. His last official professional boxing bout was on his birthday September 2003 with a record of 25 wins and 6 defeats.

In 2011 Dodson was scheduled to make a comeback in the super-middleweight division as part of the Prizefighter series, where he could have faced fellow 1992 Olympian Robin Reid. Dodson pulled out before the series as he felt he was not in physical condition to compete and was replaced by Joe Ainscough.

Titles in pretence
| Vacant Title last held by Dana Rosenblatt | World Super Middleweight Champion; IBO recognition 3 March 2001 – 10 December 2001 | Succeeded by Ramon Arturo Britez |
