= Tomás Ruiz =

Tomás Ruiz may refer to:

- Tomás Ruiz (boxer)
- Tomás Ruiz (field hockey)
- Tomás Ruiz González, Mexican politician
