= Grahame Cheney =

Australian boxer (born 1969)

Medal record

Men's boxing

Representing Australia

Olympic Games
Silver medal – second place	1988 Seoul	Light welterweight

Commonwealth Games
Bronze medal – third place	1990 Auckland	Welterweight

Grahame Francis "Spike" Cheney (born 27 April 1969) is a retired Australian boxer, who won a light welterweight (63.5 kg) silver medal at the 1988 Summer Olympics.

Cheney also won a bronze medal in the welterweight (67 kg) division at the 1990 Commonwealth Games.

== Olympic results ==
- 1st round bye
- Defeated Miguel González (Paraguay) RSC 2
- Defeated Ike Quartey (Ghana) 5–0
- Defeated Todd Foster (United States) 3–2
- Defeated Lars Myrberg (Sweden) 5–0
- Lost to Vyacheslav Yanovski (Soviet Union) 0–5

== Pro career ==
Cheney turned pro in 1991, winning the WBC International Welterweight title. He retired in 1996 with a professional record of 17–3–0.

== Personal life ==
Since 1998, Cheney has suffered from bipolar disorder.
