= Viorel Ioana =

Romanian boxer (born 1958)

Personal information
- Nationality: Romanian
- Born: 23 November 1958 (age 67)

Sport
- Sport: Boxing
Medal record
Representing Romania
Romania National Amateur Boxing Championships
Gold medal – first place	1980 Bucharest	Lightweight
Gold medal – first place	1982 Bucharest	Lightweight
World Amateur Championships
Bronze medal – third place	Munich 1982	Lightweight

Viorel Ioana (born 23 November 1958) is a Romanian boxer. He competed in the men's lightweight event at the 1984 Summer Olympics. He lost to Renato Cornett of Australia at the 1984 Summer Olympics. Ioana also won two national senior titles and one bronze medal at the European Amateur Boxing Championships.
