= Leopoldo Cantancio =

Filipino boxer (1963–2018)

Personal information
- Nickname: Pol
- Born: July 6, 1963 Bago, Negros Occidental, Philippines
- Died: April 20, 2018 (aged 54) Bago, Negros Occidental, Philippines
- Height: 5 ft 9 in (176 cm)
- Weight: 130 lb (60 kg)

Sport
- Weight class: Bantamweight, Featherweight, Lightweight
Medal record
Men's Boxing
Representing the Philippines
Asian Games
Silver medal – second place	1986 Seoul	Lightweight
Bronze medal – third place	1990 Beijing	Lightweight
Asian Amateur Boxing Championships
Gold medal – first place	1983 Naha	Featherweight
Gold medal – first place	1985 Bangkok	Lightweight
Southeast Asian Games
Gold medal – first place	1983 Singapore	Featherweight
Gold medal – first place	1987 Jakarta	Lightweight
Bronze medal – third place	1981 Manila	Bantamweight

Leopoldo Cantancio (July 6, 1963 – April 20, 2018) was a Filipino boxer who competed at the 1984 Summer Olympics and 1988 Summer Olympics. He won a silver medal at the 1986 Asian Games and a bronze medal at the 1990 Asian Games, and was a two-time gold medalist in the Asian Amateur Boxing Championships.

== Career ==
Cantancio was just 18 years old when he won a bronze medal in the bantamweight division at the 1981 Southeast Asian Games held in Manila. The Bago native took part at the 1982 AIBA World Amateur Championships and was eliminated in the Round of 16. He also participated at the 1982 Asian Games in New Delhi as a featherweight and was knocked out by North Korean Jo Rion-sik in the quarterfinals.

Cantancio finally tasted success at the 1983 Southeast Asian Games in Singapore when he won the gold medal in the featherweight division. Later that year, he claimed the gold medal in his weight class at the Asian Amateur Boxing Championships in Naha after defeating South Korean Lee Choon-kil in the final.

Cantancio, along with Nelson Jamili and Efren Tabanas, represented the Philippines at the 1984 Summer Olympics. In his first bout at the Memorial Sports Arena, Cantancio posted a unanimous decision win over Malawi's Solomon Kondowe. He next beat Pakistan's Asif Dar to reach the last 16 of the lightweight division. In his next bout, Cantancio absorbed a 2–3 loss to Nigeria's Christopher Ossai but the jury reversed the verdict and handed the Filipino a 5–0 win and a quarterfinal date with South Korean Chun Chil-sung.

Against Chun, Cantancio dictated the tempo of the fight before being knocked down by a left hook on the jaw and was counted out halfway through the third and final round. It was a devastating result as a win would’ve guaranteed the Filipino a bronze medal.

Cantancio resumed his career after his heartbreaking Olympic stint in Los Angeles and won a gold medal in the lightweight division at the 1985 Asian Amateur Boxing Championships in Bangkok where he was also named Best Boxer of the tournament.

At the 1986 Asian Games, Cantancio secured a silver medal after losing to hometown bet Kwon Hyun-kyu in the final.

The following year, Cantancio triumphed in the lightweight division of the Southeast Asian Games in Jakarta to claim his second gold medal in the biennial multi-sport spectacle.

Cantancio again represented the country at the 1988 Summer Olympics but could not duplicate his quarterfinal finish in Los Angeles. Drawn against Kostya Tszyu in his opening bout, Cantancio lasted just a round against the hard-hitting Soviet boxer who went on to win multiple world titles in the professional ranks.

In one of his last major tournaments, Cantancio bagged a bronze medal at the 1990 Asian Games in Beijing.

Cantancio became a full-time police officer after hanging up his gloves and later became a local coach.

== Personal life ==
Cantancio studied at Arellano University.

== Death ==
On April 20, 2018, while on his way home after attending a boxing tournament in Bacolod, Cantancio lost control of his motorcycle and slammed into an electric post in Barangay Malingin, Bago. He was rushed to the Bago Hospital where he was declared dead on arrival due to severe head injuries. Cantancio had just filed his certificate of candidacy as kagawad at the time of the accident.

== Legacy ==
Although Cantancio never won any medals at the Olympics Games or AIBA World Boxing Championships, he was successful in getting many podium finishes in regional championships and hence became one of the important Filipino amateur boxers in that era.
