= Ángel Beltré =

Dominican boxer (born 1963)

Personal information
- Nationality: Dominican
- Born: 20 September 1963 (age 62)

Sport
- Sport: Boxing
Medal record
Men's amateur boxing
Representing Dominican Republic
Pan American Games
Bronze medal – third place	1983 Caracas	Lightweight

Ángel Beltré (born 20 September 1963) is a Dominican Republic boxer. He competed in the men's lightweight event at the 1984 Summer Olympics.
