= Martin Ndongo-Ebanga =

Cameroonian boxer (1966–2024)

Personal information
- Born: 23 March 1966
- Died: 6 March 2024 (aged 57)
Medal record
Men's Boxing
Representing Cameroon
Olympic Games
Bronze medal – third place	1984 Los Angeles	Lightweight

Martin Ndongo Ebanga (23 March 1966 – 6 March 2024) was a Cameroonian boxer.

Ndongo-Ebanga won the bronze medal in the men's lightweight division (– 60 kg) at the 1984 Summer Olympics in Los Angeles, California. He was defeated in the semifinals by eventual silver medalist Luis Ortiz of Puerto Rico. N'Dongo also competed at the 1988 Summer Olympics in Seoul, South Korea, where he was eliminated in the second round. He died on 6 March 2024, at the age of 57.

== Olympic results ==
- 1st round bye
- Defeated Shadrah Odhiambo (Sweden) RSC 2
- Defeated Gordon Carew (Guyana) KO 2
- Defeated Fahri Sumer (Turkey) 4-1
- Lost to Luis Ortiz (Puerto Rico) 2-3
