= Michael Davis (weightlifter) =

American weightlifter

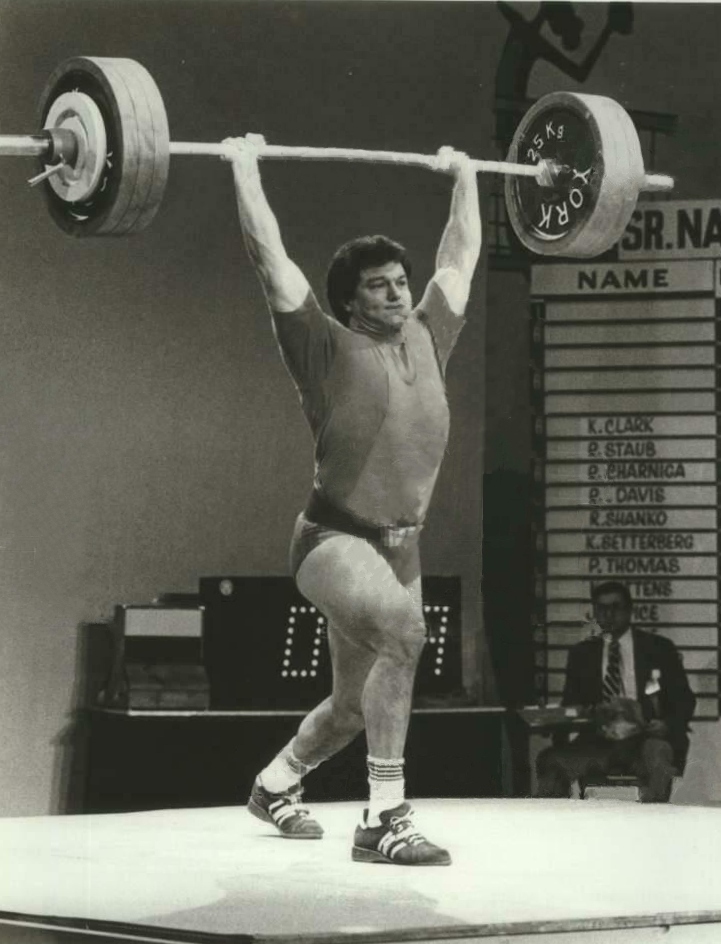
- Davis in 1984

Sport
- Sport: Weightlifting
Medal record
Representing United States
Pan American Games
Gold medal – first place	1983 Caracas	-100 kg

Michael Davis is a retired American weightlifter. Competing in the −100 kg division he won a gold medal at the 1983 Pan American Games.
