= Mark Elliott (boxer) =

British boxer (born 1966)

Personal information
- Nationality: British (English)
- Born: 2 February 1966 (age 59) Wellington, England

Sport
- Sport: Boxing

Mark Conrad Elliott (born 2 February 1966) is a former British boxer.

The son of Jamaican Olympian boxer Johnny Elliott, he competed in the men's light welterweight event at the 1988 Summer Olympics. At the 1988 Summer Olympics, he lost to Ludovic Proto of France.

Elliott won the 1987 and 1989 Amateur Boxing Association British welterweight title, when boxing out of the GKN Sankey ABC and the Bennett's Bank ABC respectively.
