= Bakary Fofana =

Bakary Fofana may refer to:

- Bakary Fofana (politician), Guinea minister for foreign affairs
- Bakary Fofana (boxer) (born 1966), Côte d'Ivoire boxer
