= Ahmad Mayez Khanji =

Syrian boxer

Personal information
- Nationality: Syrian
- Born: 22 June 1967 (age 58)

Sport
- Sport: Boxing

Ahmad Mayez Khanji (Arabic: أحمد مايز خانجي; born 22 June 1967) is a Syrian boxer. He competed in the men's light welterweight event at the 1988 Summer Olympics in Seoul. At the 1988 Summer Olympics, he lost to Lars Myrberg of Sweden.
