= Christian Rivera =

Christian or Cristian Rivera may refer to:

- Christian Rivera (IWDominate) (born 1990), American esports coach and streamer
- Christian Rivera (Spanish footballer) (born 1997), Spanish football defensive midfielder
- Christian Rivera (Colombian footballer) (born 1996), Colombian football midfielder
- Cristian Rivera (weightlifter) (born 1963), Dominican Republic weightlifter
