= Luis Ortiz (Puerto Rican boxer) =

Puerto Rican former boxer

Personal information
- Nationality: Puerto Rico
- Born: Luis Ortiz Humacao, Puerto Rico
- Weight: Lightweight

Boxing career

Boxing record
- Total fights: 3
- Wins: 2
- Win by KO: 0
- Losses: 1
- Draws: 0
Medal record
Men's boxing
Representing Puerto Rico
Olympic Games
Silver medal – second place	1984 Los Angeles	Lightweight

Luis Ortiz Flores (born November 5, 1965, in Humacao) is a Puerto Rican former boxer.

== Amateur career ==
Ortiz had an award-winning amateur career, which led him to represent Puerto Rico in the 1984 Los Angeles summer Olympics. Ortiz at first wasn't very well known in Puerto Rico. Within days after he started competing in the Olympics, that changed, as he began to win bouts. When he secured a bronze medal at the games, he became a nationally known figure, because Puerto Rico had only had two other medalists in their Olympic history, Juan Evangelista Venegas (1948, bronze, boxing) and Orlando Maldonado (1976, bronze, boxing).

Ortiz made history, however, when he secured the silver medal a few days before the end of the games. According to him, he weighed himself on the morning of the day before the gold medal fight in his Olympic village room, and he outweighed his division's weight limit (135 pounds) by one and a half pounds. As a consequence of that, since that moment and until the gold medal fight, he was placed in a strict, liquids-only diet by his training team.

Ortiz made the weight for the fight and was allowed to fight for the gold medal. However, he lost the fight by a knockout in round two to future multiple-time professional world champion Pernell Whitaker.

Ortiz and Arístides González also made history another way during these games: when Gonzalez won a bronze medal in boxing at the Middleweight division, these games became the first Olympic games in which Puerto Rico earned two medals in the same games. While José Torres, a Puerto Rican, won a silver medal in boxing at the 1956 Olympics, he did so representing the United States, as he was required to because he had resided there more than six months. Ortiz's silver medal is historically recognized by Puerto Rican sports historians as the first silver medal won by Puerto Rico.

Nevertheless, Ortiz was the object of a hero's welcome by about 300 fans at Luis Muñoz Marín International Airport in San Juan when he returned home. His hometown officially welcomed him by placing many banners on street lights and thank you messages.

=== Olympic results ===
- 1st round bye
- Defeated Buala Sakul (Thailand) KO 2
- Defeated Alex Dickson (Great Britain) KO 2
- Defeated José Antonio Hernando (Spain) 5-0
- Defeated Martin N'Dongo (Cameroon) 3-2
- Lost to Pernell Whitaker (United States) TKO 2

== Pro career ==
Ortiz tried professional boxing between 1985 and 1986. He did not enjoy much success in the professional rankings, winning 2 bouts and losing 1. His lone loss was to California fighter, Henry Lugo.

All his three professional fights were won or lost by decision. Ortiz retired soon after his third bout, and now holds an office job in his native town.

== Retirement (1986–present) ==
In 2016, Ortiz made a bid to become a delegate of the Puerto Rico Boxing Federation.

== See also ==
- List of Puerto Ricans
- Monica Puig
