= Sivaraj Naalamuthu Pillai =

Indian weightlifter (born 1968)

Personal information
- Nationality: Indian
- Born: 25 April 1968 (age 56)

Sport
- Sport: Weightlifting

Sivaraj Naalamuthu Pillai (born 25 April 1968) is an Indian weightlifter. He competed in the men's featherweight event at the 1992 Summer Olympics.
