= Sugiono Katijo =

Indonesian weightlifter

Personal information
- Nationality: Indonesian
- Born: 21 August 1971 (age 53)

Sport
- Sport: Weightlifting

Sugiono Katijo (born 21 August 1971) is an Indonesian weightlifter. He competed in the men's featherweight event at the 1992 Summer Olympics.
