= José Saizozema =

Dominican Republic boxer (born 1965)

Personal information
- Nationality: Dominican
- Born: 30 November 1965 (age 59)

Sport
- Sport: Boxing

José Saizozema (born 30 November 1965) is a Dominican Republic boxer. He competed in the men's light welterweight event at the 1988 Summer Olympics. At the 1988 Summer Olympics, he lost to Ike Quartey of Ghana.
