= Víctor Pérez (Puerto Rican boxer) =

Puerto Rican boxer

Personal information
- Nationality: Puerto Rican
- Born: 9 February 1971 (age 55)

Sport
- Sport: Boxing

Víctor Pérez (born 9 February 1971) is a Puerto Rican boxer. He competed in the men's light welterweight event at the 1988 Summer Olympics.

As a professional, one of his most significant wins was over fellow Puerto Rican Rafael Solis.
