= Paul Toroczcoi =

Romanian weightlifter (born 1968)

Personal information
- Nationality: Romanian
- Born: 27 December 1968 (age 56); Bistrița, Romania

Sport
- Sport: Weightlifting

Paul Toroczcoi (born 27 December 1968) is a Romanian former weightlifter. He competed in the men's featherweight event at the 1992 Summer Olympics.
