= Mustapha Fadli =

Moroccan boxer (1961–2016)

Personal information
- Nationality: Moroccan
- Born: 1961
- Died: 14 March 2016 (aged 54–55)

Sport
- Sport: Boxing

Mustapha Fadli (1961 – 14 March 2016) was a Moroccan boxer. He competed in the men's lightweight event at the 1984 Summer Olympics.
