= Riadh Khedher =

Iraqi weightlifter

Personal information
- Nationality: Iraqi
- Born: 1 July 1972 (age 52)

Sport
- Sport: Weightlifting

Riadh Khedher (born 1 July 1972) is an Iraqi weightlifter. He competed in the men's featherweight event at the 1992 Summer Olympics.
