= Toru Hara =

Japanese weightlifter

Personal information
- Nationality: Japanese
- Born: 5 January 1962 (age 63)

Sport
- Sport: Weightlifting

Toru Hara (born 5 January 1962) is a Japanese weightlifter. He competed in the men's bantamweight event at the 1988 Summer Olympics.
