= Liasu Braimoh =

Nigerian boxer

Personal information
- Nationality: Nigerian
- Born: 15 August 1965 (age 59)

Sport
- Sport: Boxing

Liasu Braimoh (born 15 August 1965) is a Nigerian boxer. He competed in the men's light welterweight event at the 1988 Summer Olympics.
