= Reiner Gies =

German boxer

Personal information
- Born: March 12, 1963 (age 63) Kaiserslautern, West Germany
- Height: 5 ft 11 in (180 cm)
Medal record
Men's Boxing
Representing West Germany
Olympic Games
Bronze medal – third place	1988 Seoul	Light Welterweight

Reiner Gies (born March 12, 1963, in Kaiserslautern, West Germany) is a former German boxer who won a Light Welterweight Bronze Medal at the 1988 Summer Olympics for West Germany. Four years earlier, when Los Angeles, California hosted the Games, he was eliminated in the quarterfinals.

== Olympic results ==
Represented West Germany as a lightweight at the 1984 Los Angeles Olympic Games.

- 1st round bye
- Defeated Samir Khenyab (Iraq) 4-1
- Defeated John Kalbhenn (Canada) 5-0
- Lost to Pernell Whitaker (United States) 0-5

Represented West Germany as a Light Welterweight at the 1988 Seoul Olympic Games, capturing a bronze medal.

- Defeated Basil Maelagi (Solomon Islands) walkover
- Defeated Lórant Szabó (Hungary) 5-0
- Defeated Adrian Carew (Guyana) 3-2
- Defeated Sodnomdarjaagiin Altansükh (Mongolia) 4-1
- Lost to Vyacheslav Yanovskiy (Soviet Union) KO 1

== Pro career ==
Gies turned pro in 1991 and had limited success, losing two fights to journeymen and retiring with a record of 13-2-0.
