= Harinela Randriamanarivo =

Malagasy weightlifter

Personal information
- Nationality: Malagasy
- Born: 25 January 1966 (age 59)

Sport
- Sport: Weightlifting

Harinela Randriamanarivo (born 25 January 1966) is a Malagasy weightlifter. He competed in the men's featherweight event at the 1992 Summer Olympics.
