= Osman Manzanares =

Honduran weightlifter

Personal information
- Full name: Osman Roney Manzanares Bonilla
- Nationality: Honduran and American
- Born: 2 November 1965 (age 60)

Sport
- Sport: Weightlifting

Osman Roney Manzanares Bonilla (born 2 November 1965) is a Honduran and American weightlifter and weightlifting coach. As an athlete for Honduras, he competed in the men's featherweight event at the 1992 Summer Olympics. He later moved to the United States and opened a gym to coach weightlifters. He also turned to masters weightlifting representing Tennessee and the United States, becoming an 18-time national champion and three-time world champion.

== Biography ==
Osman Roney Manzanares Bonilla was born on 2 November 1965 in Honduras. As an athlete, he represented Honduras in international competition. He was initially a bodybuilder but was introduced to weightlifting in 1984 after a Polish weightlifting coach and his athletes held a seminar in Honduras.

He trained in the sport for quite some time and was eventually selected to compete for Honduras at the 1992 Summer Olympics held in Barcelona, Spain. At the 1992 Summer Games, he was entered in one event, the men's featherweight event for weightlifters that weighed 60 kilograms (130 lb) or less. He competed in the event on 28 July 1992. There, he lifted a snatch of 92.5 kilograms (204 lb) and a clean and jerk of 115.0 kilograms (253.5 lb) for a total of 207.5 kilograms (457 lb). Overall, he placed 29th out of the 31 weightlifters that competed in the event.

After the 1996 Summer Games, he moved to New York before moving to Nashville, Tennessee, around 2001 to train athletes he knew while he lived in Honduras. They initially trained at odd locations though Manzanares eventually opened his own gym in 2009 in The Nations before moving the location to Madison in 2016.

After his career, he turned to masters weightlifting. Representing Tennessee and the United States, he became an 18-time national champion and three-time world champion in the sport. He also set three national records for the men's 73 kilograms (161 lb) category for the masters 55 to 59 age group.
