= Humberto Fuentes =

Venezuelan weightlifter (born 1961)

Personal information
- Born: December 13, 1961 (age 64)
- Height: 1.50 m (4 ft 11 in)
Medal record
Men's Weightlifting
Representing Venezuela
Pan American Games
Silver medal – second place	1991 Havana	Flyweight

Humberto Fuentes Rodríguez (born December 13, 1961) is a retired male weightlifter from Venezuela. He competed in three Summer Olympics for his native South American country during his career.

== Major results ==
Year	Venue	Weight	Snatch (kg)					Clean & Jerk (kg)					Total	Rank
Year	Venue	Weight	1	2	3	Results	Rank	1	2	3	Results	Rank	Total	Rank
Representing Venezuela
Olympic Games
1992	Barcelona, Spain	52 kg	100.0	~~105.0~~	~~105.0~~	100.0	9	125.0	130.0	~~135.0~~	130.0	7	230.0	7
1988	Seoul, South Korea	52 kg	~~100.0~~	~~100.0~~	100.0	100.0	12	~~127.5~~	127.5	~~132.5~~	127.5	11	227.5	10
1980	Moscow, Soviet Union	52 kg	~~90.0~~	~~90.0~~	90.0	90.0	14	117.5	~~127.5~~	~~127.5~~	117.5	10	207.5	11
Pan American Games
1991	Havana, Cuba	52 kg	—N/a	—N/a	—N/a	105.0	2nd place, silver medalist(s)	—N/a	—N/a	—N/a	125.0	3rd place, bronze medalist(s)	230.0	2nd place, silver medalist(s)
1987	Indianapolis, United States	52 kg	—N/a	—N/a	—N/a	97.5	2nd place, silver medalist(s)	—N/a	—N/a	—N/a	125.0	2nd place, silver medalist(s)	222.5	2nd place, silver medalist(s)
1983	Caracas, Venezuela	52 kg	—N/a	—N/a	—N/a	95.0	2nd place, silver medalist(s)	—N/a	—N/a	—N/a	125.0	2nd place, silver medalist(s)	220.0	2nd place, silver medalist(s)
Central American and Caribbean Games
1993	Ponce, Puerto Rico	53 kg	—N/a	—N/a	—N/a	100.0	2nd place, silver medalist(s)	—N/a	—N/a	—N/a	130.0	3rd place, bronze medalist(s)	230.0	3rd place, bronze medalist(s)
1990	Mexico City, Mexico	52 kg	—N/a	—N/a	—N/a	102.5	1st place, gold medalist(s)	—N/a	—N/a	—N/a	125.0	2nd place, silver medalist(s)	227.5	1st place, gold medalist(s)
1986	Santiago de los Caballeros, Dominican Republic	52 kg	—N/a	—N/a	—N/a	100.0	2nd place, silver medalist(s)	—N/a	—N/a	—N/a	130.0	1st place, gold medalist(s)	230.0	1st place, gold medalist(s)
