= Lyton Mphande =

Malawian boxer (born 1963)

Personal information
- Born: 14 May 1963 (age 63)
Medal record
Men's Boxing
Representing Malawi
Commonwealth Games
| Bronze medal – third place | 1986 Edinburgh | Lightweight |

Lyton Levison Mphande (born 14 May 1963) is a former Malawian lightweight and light-welterweight boxer. He received a bronze medal at the 1986 Commonwealth Games. He competed at the 1988 Summer Olympics, where he defeated Jhapat Singh Bhujel of Nepal before losing to Anthony Mwamba of Zambia. He finished in ninth place.
