= Apete Temo =

Fijian boxer

Personal information
- Nationality: Fijian
- Born: 15 November 1968 (age 56)

Sport
- Sport: Boxing

Apete Temo (born 15 November 1968) is a Fijian boxer. He competed in the men's light welterweight event at the 1988 Summer Olympics.
