= Kazuo Sato (weightlifter) =

Japanese weightlifter

Personal information
- Nationality: Japanese
- Born: 21 January 1970 (age 55)

Sport
- Sport: Weightlifting

Kazuo Sato (佐藤 和夫, Satō Kazuo, born 21 January 1970) is a Japanese weightlifter. He competed in the men's featherweight event at the 1992 Summer Olympics.
