= Solomon Kondowe =

Malawian boxer (born 1960)

Personal information
- Nationality: Malawian
- Born: 23 September 1960 (age 65)

Sport
- Sport: Boxing
Medal record
Men's Boxing
Representing Malawi
Commonwealth Games
Bronze medal – third place	1986 Edinburgh	Light welterweight

Solomon Kondowe (born 23 September 1960) is a Malawian boxer. He competed in the men's lightweight event at the 1984 Summer Olympics. He also competed at the 1978 Commonwealth Games and the 1986 Commonwealth Games, winning the bronze medal at the latter. He remains, along with Lyton Mphande, the last Malawian to win a medal at the Commonwealth Games, and is one of only three all-time.
