= Jaineck Chinyanta =

Zambian boxer (born 1958)

Personal information
- Nationality: Zambian
- Born: 1 August 1958 (age 66)

Sport
- Sport: Boxing

Jaineck Chinyanta (born 1 August 1958) is a Zambian boxer. He competed in the men's lightweight event at the 1984 Summer Olympics.
