= Humberto Rodríguez =

Mexican boxer (born 1969)

Personal information
- Nationality: Mexican
- Born: 7 March 1969 (age 56)

Sport
- Sport: Boxing

Humberto Rodríguez (born 7 March 1969) is a Mexican former professional boxer who competed from 1989 to 1998. As an amateur, he competed in the men's light welterweight event at the 1988 Summer Olympics.
