= Todd Foster =

American boxer

Todd Foster (born August 27, 1967, in Great Falls, Montana) is a former American boxer in the Welterweight division.

== Amateur career ==
Foster was an amateur boxing standout. In the Light welterweight division, he was the 1987 National Golden Gloves champion, silver medalist at the 1987 Pan American Games, and 1988 United States Amateur champion, which earned a seed in the Olympic trials.

== Olympic results ==
Foster was a member of the 1988 US Olympic Team, boxing as a Light Welterweight. His results were:

- 1st round bye
- Defeated Khalid Rahilou (Morocco) KO 2
- Defeated Chun Jil-Chun (South Korea) KO 2 Note: Chun was confused by the multi-ring setup with a bell to end rounds in a different ring and a gong in his own, and stopped fighting in the middle of a round after hearing a bell and was hit by Foster. Chun's coaches could be seen ringside directing Chun to fall, thinking they could win by foul. Chun was counted out, as there was no foul. The South Korean (host country) team protested and later in the day the boxers returned to the ring to fight again. Foster won by KO.
- Lost to Grahame Cheney (Australia) 2-g

== Professional career ==
"Kid" Foster turned pro in 1989 and won his first 22 fights, setting up a bout with former champ Jimmy Paul in 1992. Paul won by an upset KO in the 7th round. In 1995 he challenged Hector Camacho for the IBC Welterweight Title, but lost via TKO in the 5th round. Foster later retired in 2001.
