= Martin Zawieja =

German weightlifter

Personal information
- Born: 31 January 1963 (age 63) Dortmund, West Germany
- Height: 1.81 m (5 ft 11 in)
- Weight: 128 kg (282 lb)

Sport
- Sport: Weightlifting
- Club: AC Soest, Soest
Medal record
Representing West Germany
Olympic Games
Bronze medal – third place	1988 Seoul	Super heavyweight; 182.5+232.5 kg

Martin Zawieja (born 31 January 1963) is a retired West German weightlifter who was active between 1985 and 1992. He competed at the 1988 and 1992 Summer Olympics in the super heavyweight category and finished in third and ninth place, respectively. He finished third in the snatch at the 1991 World Weightlifting Championships and won three national titles in 1984, 1990 and 1991.

After retiring from competitions he studied physical education, graduating in 1995, and later worked as a weightlifting coach. He was the head coach of the national junior (2001–2006) and women's teams (2002–2005).
