= David Balp =

French weightlifter

Personal information
- Nationality: French
- Born: 3 March 1970 (age 55); Clermont-l'Hérault, France

Sport
- Sport: Weightlifting

David Balp (born 3 March 1970) is a French weightlifter. He competed in the men's featherweight event at the 1992 Summer Olympics.
