= Yon Haryono =

Indonesian weightlifter

Personal information
- Nationality: Indonesian
- Born: 16 February 1969 (age 56)

Sport
- Sport: Weightlifting

Yon Haryono (born 16 February 1969) is an Indonesian weightlifter. He competed in the men's bantamweight event at the 1988 Summer Olympics.
