= Jean-Claude Labonte =

Seychellois boxer (born 1957)

Personal information
- Nationality: Seychellois
- Born: 23 September 1957 (age 67)

Sport
- Sport: Boxing

Jean-Claude Labonte (born 23 September 1957) is a Seychellois boxer. He competed in the men's lightweight event at the 1984 Summer Olympics.
