= Avaavau Avaavau =

Samoan boxer (born 1965)

Personal information
- Nationality: Samoan
- Born: 30 August 1965 (age 59)

Sport
- Sport: Boxing

Avaavau Avaavau (born 30 August 1965) is a Samoan boxer. He competed in the men's light welterweight event at the 1988 Summer Olympics. At the 1988 Summer Olympics, he lost to Khalid Rahilou of Morocco.
