= Adhan Mohamed =

Egyptian weightlifter

Personal information
- Nationality: Egyptian
- Born: 3 November 1966 (age 58)

Sport
- Sport: Weightlifting

Adhan Mohamed (born 3 November 1966) is an Egyptian weightlifter. He competed in the men's super heavyweight event at the 1988 Summer Olympics.
