= Ro Hyon-il =

North Korean weightlifter

Personal information
- Nationality: North Korean
- Born: 2 June 1969 (age 55)

Sport
- Sport: Weightlifting

Ro Hyon-il (born 2 June 1969) is a North Korean weightlifter. He competed in the men's featherweight event at the 1992 Summer Olympics.
