= Edwin Mata =

Ecuadorian weightlifter

Personal information
- Nationality: Ecuadorian
- Born: 1 January 1970 (age 55)

Sport
- Sport: Weightlifting

Edwin Mata (born 1 January 1970) is an Ecuadorian weightlifter. He competed in the men's bantamweight event at the 1988 Summer Olympics.
