= Jonas Bade =

Papua New Guinean boxer

Personal information
- Nationality: Papua New Guinean
- Born: 16 March 1956 (age 69)

Sport
- Sport: Boxing

Jonas Bade (born 16 March 1956) is a Papua New Guinean boxer. He competed in the men's light welterweight event at the 1988 Summer Olympics. At the time, he also worked as an apprentice mechanic.
