= Omar Méndez (boxer) =

Nicaraguan boxer (born 1961)

Personal information
- Nationality: Nicaraguan
- Born: 6 February 1961 (age 64)

Sport
- Sport: Boxing

Omar Méndez (born 6 February 1961) is a Nicaraguan boxer. He competed in the men's lightweight event at the 1984 Summer Olympics. Méndez also represented Nicaragua at the 1983 Pan American Games.
