= Douglas Odame =

Ghanaian boxer

Personal information
- Nationality: Ghanaian
- Born: 1 June 1963 (age 61)

Sport
- Sport: Boxing

Douglas Odame (born 1 June 1963) is a Ghanaian boxer. He competed in the men's lightweight event at the 1984 Summer Olympics.
