= John Kalbhenn =

Canadian boxer

John Kalbhenn (born April 14, 1963 in Kitchener, Ontario) is a retired boxer from Canada, who competed for his native country at the 1984 Summer Olympics in Los Angeles, California. There he was defeated in the third round of the men's lightweight (– 60 kg) division by West Germany's Reiner Gies.

== Olympic results ==
- 1st round bye
- Defeated Wilson Randrinasolo (Madagascar) RSC 1
- Lost to Reiner Gies (West Germany) 0-5
