= Howard Grant (boxer) =

Canadian boxer (born 1966)

Personal information
- Full name: Howard Grant
- Nickname: The Snake
- Nationality: Canadian
- Born: June 22, 1966 (age 60) Saint Ann's Bay, Jamaica
- Height: 1.80 m (5 ft 11 in)
- Weight: 64 kg (141 lb)

Sport
- Sport: Boxing
- Weight class: Light Welterweight
- Club: Ring 83 Boxing Club
Medal record
World Amateur Championships
Silver medal – second place	1986 Reno	Light Welterweight
Commonwealth Games
Gold medal – first place	1986 Edinburgh	Light Welterweight

Howard Grant (born June 22, 1966, in Saint Ann, Jamaica) is a retired male Canadian boxer, competing in the light-welterweight (– 63.5 kg) division. A resident of Montréal, Quebec, he represented Canada at the 1988 Summer Olympics in Seoul, South Korea, where he was defeated in the round of 16 by Sweden's Lars Myrberg.

Grant won the gold medal in the same weight division, two years earlier, at the 1986 Commonwealth Games Howard is renowned for training top UFC Fighters and Professional Boxers. He and his brother Otis have their own gym on the West Island in Montreal, Grant Brothers Boxing, where they train professional athletes and many amateurs.

Not only coaching, Howard is involved in developing boxing product with several brands such as Grant Boxing and GBB.

Howard has trained former UFC welterweight champion Georges St-Pierre in boxing for a few years now.

== Amateur career ==
Howard Grant's journey into boxing started in 1979 in Montreal. Progressing slowly, Howard caught the eye of Pierre Gauthier from the Saint Laurent Boxing Club. As Howard fine tuned his style over the months, and leading into his path into amateur boxing, Howard was eventually coached by Russ Anber leading into his first amateur boxing tournaments.

As a Junior at 15 years old, Howard Grant captured the gold medal in the Bantamweight division at a Tournament in Vancouver, British Columbia in 1981.

One year later, he captured the gold medal in the Featherweight division at a Tournament in Montreal, Quebec in 1982.

=== 1983 Canada Games ===
Representing Quebec, Howard Grant defeated Ontario's James Hope to capture the gold medal in the 1983 Canada Games in Saguenay-Lac-St-Jean in the Lightweight division.

=== 1983 World Juniors in Dominican Republic: ===
Captured the bronze medal in the Lightweight Division. He lost to the eventual gold medalist, Angel Esponosa, in the semi-finals. Howard Grant considers Angel Esponosa as one of his toughest opponents.

=== 1984 Canadian Nationals in Nova Scotia ===
Captured the gold medal in the Lightweight Division.

=== 1984-1986 ===
From 84 to 86 Howard Grant participated in many European tournaments representing Canada including the Stockholm Boxing Open in Sweden and the Tammer Tournament in Finland – capturing the silver medal in both tournaments.

=== 1986 World Amateur Boxing Championships ===
Captured the silver medal in the 1986 World Amateur Boxing Championships in Reno, Nevada. Howard was defeated by Vasily Shisov.

=== 1986 Commonwealth Games ===
In his biggest tournament victory in his young career, Howard Grant defeated David Clencie by point decision to capture Gold for Canada in the Light-Welterweight Division. Along with Howard Grant, other notable boxers that participated in this tournament were former Undisputed Heavyweight Champion, Lennox Lewis, who also captured Gold in his division.

=== 1987 International Tournament in Albena, Bulgaria: ===
Captured the gold medal in Light welterweight division during the 1987 International Tournament in Albena, Bulgaria

=== 1987 President's Cup in Indonesia ===
Captured the President's Cup in the Light-welterweight division

=== 1988 Summer Olympic Games in Seoul, South Korea: ===
After defeating Andreas Otto of East Germany in his first bout, Howard was defeated in the Round of 16 by the eventual bronze medal winner, Lars Myrberg of Sweden by split decision.

- Round of 64: bye
- Round of 32: defeated Andreas Otto (East Germany) referee stopped contest in the first round
- Round of 16: lost to Lars Myberg (Sweden) by decision, 1–4

== Professional career ==
After concluding the amateur portion of his career, Howard Grant turned pro after the 1988 Seoul Olympic Games winning his first 6 professional boxing bouts and going undefeated in his first 17 fights. Howard compiled a professional record of 16–2–1. Howard's most notable opponents at the professional level included champions Stevie Johnston, Jake Rodriguez and Billy Schwer.

=== Professional Fights (16-2-1) ===
Date	Opponent	Location	Result
1995-05-02	Stevie Johnston	Arizona Charlie's, Las Vegas NABF Lightweight Title	L by TKO
1995-02-24	Clarence Barnes	Palais des Sports, Jonquiere	W by TKO
1994-05-11	Billy Schwer	Ice Bowl, Stevenage Commonwealth (British Empire) Lightweight Title	L by KO
1994-01-29	Nedrick Simmons	Charlottetown Canada Lightweight Title	W by TKO
1993-06-18	Clifford Hicks	Hotel Le Roussillon, Jonquiere	W by UD
1993-03-30	Alex Perez	Auditorium, Verdun	W by TKO
1992-11-03	Mark Smith	St-Leonard	W by UD
1992-05-02	Greg Gayle	Orillia vacant Canada Lightweight Title	W by UD
1991-12-10	Jeff Trimble	Paul Sauve Arena, Montreal	W by KO
1991-09-10	Jeff Hanna	The Palace, Laval	W by TKO
1990-12-11	John Kalbhenn	The Palace, Laval	W by TKO
1990-08-01	Nedrick Simmons	Copps Coliseum, Hamilton	W by SD
1990-05-03	Jake Rodriguez	Quality Inn Hotel, Newark	Draw
1990-04-11	Eugene McCully	Albany	W by PTS
1989-09-29	Ray Bright	Civic Center, Hartford	W by KO
1989-06-27	Eddie Correa	Paul Sauve Arena, Montreal	W by KO
1989-06-16	Greg Cadiz	Sheraton Hotel, Hartford	W by PTS
1989-05-05	Jose Soto	Civic Center, Hartford	W by TKO
1988-11-29	Albert Dumas	Forum, Montreal	W by UD

== Post-Boxing Career ==
Howard Grant's love of the sport never wavered once his in-ring career came to a close. Howard has spent his post-professional career training the next crop of in-ring gladiators.

Howard Grant along with his Brother, former WBO Middleweight Champion, Otis “Magic” Grant started the Grant Brothers Boxing Gym in 2003. With his experience and skill, Howard has trained many notable pugilists over the years including his brother Otis, former Canadian Champion, Tony Pep, former IBF super-middleweight champion, Lucien Bute, 1998 Commonwealth games silver medalist, Herman Ngoudjo, former WBA light middleweight world champion, Joachim Alcine, current NABA super bantamweight champion, Olivier Lontchi, former Olympian, Dale Brown, former super middleweight contender, Librado Andrade, former World Boxing Organisation NABO Middleweight Champion, Francis Lafreniere, former Canadian middleweight title holder and IBF International middleweight title contender, Walid Smichet, former World Boxing Council World Super Lightweight champion, Leonard Dorin.

Howard has also trained many accomplished mixed martial artists including future UFC Hall of Famer and decorated champion, Georges St. Pierre, current Bellator Welterweight World Champion, Rory MacDonald, former top UFC middleweight contender, Patrick Côté, former TKO Middleweight Champion, David L’Oiseau, former UFC fighter, Mike Ricci, current UFC Lightweight competitor, Irish Joe Duffy, former UFC contender, Zack Makovsky, former UFC fighter and current TKO competitor, Xavier Alaoui, former UFC and current Bellator top contender, Valerie Letourneau, current TKO competitor, Jamie Mancini, and up-and-coming female MMA fighter and current TKO competitor, Corinne Laframboise.
