= Weightlifting at the 1988 Summer Olympics – Men's +110 kg =

Weightlifting at the Olympics

Men's +110 kg at the Games of the XXIV Olympiad
- Venue: Olympic Weightlifting Gymnasium
- Date: 29 September 1988
- Competitors: 18 from 13 nations

Medalists
1st place, gold medalist(s)		Aleksandr Kurlovich	Soviet Union
2nd place, silver medalist(s)		Manfred Nerlinger	West Germany
3rd place, bronze medalist(s)		Martin Zawieja	West Germany

The men's +110 kg weightlifting event was the heaviest event at the weightlifting competition of the 1988 Summer Olympics, with competitors required to have a minimum of 110 kilograms of body mass. The competition took place on 29 September, and participants were divided in two groups.

Each lifter performed in both the snatch and clean and jerk lifts, with the final score being the sum of the lifter's best result in each. The athlete received three attempts in each of the two lifts, with the score for the lift being the heaviest weight successfully lifted.

== Results ==
Rank	Athlete	Group	Body weight	Snatch (kg)				Clean & Jerk (kg)				Total
Rank	Athlete	Group	Body weight	1	2	3	Result	1	2	3	Result	Total
1st place, gold medalist(s)	Aleksandr Kurlovich (URS)	A	132.20	202.5	207.5	212.5	212.5	245	~~250~~	250	250	462.5 OR
2nd place, silver medalist(s)	Manfred Nerlinger (FRG)	A	149.80	~~190~~	190	~~195~~	190	240	~~266~~	~~266~~	240	430
3rd place, bronze medalist(s)	Martin Zawieja (FRG)	A	127.55	182.5	~~187.5~~	~~190~~	182.5	220	227.5	232.5	232.5	415
4	Mario Martinez (USA)	A	139.45	~~175~~	175	~~182.5~~	175	217.5	232.5	~~242.5~~	232.5	407.5
5	Petr Hudeček (TCH)	A	128.60	175	~~180~~	~~180~~	175	210	217.5	225	225	400
6	Reda El-Batoty (EGY)	A	120.15	~~170~~	170	175	175	200	210	217.5	217.5	392.5
7	Charles Garzarella (AUS)	B	148.10	155	160	162.5	162.5	200	205	207.5	207.5	370
8	Pavlos Saltsidis (GRE)	B	112.55	155	160	~~165~~	160	~~200~~	200	207.5	207.5	367.5
9	Matthew Vine (GBR)	B	117.00	150	155	157.5	157.5	195	~~205~~	~~205~~	195	352.5
10	John Bergman (USA)	B	132.80	155	162.5	167.5	167.5	185	~~192.5~~	~~192.5~~	185	352.5
11	Calvin Stamp (JAM)	B	119.20	145	~~150~~	150	150	185	~~192.5~~	195	195	345
12	Adhan Mohamed (EGY)	B	120.85	152.5	~~160~~	~~160~~	152.5	~~190~~	190	~~200~~	190	342.5
13	José Miguel Guzman (DOM)	B	124.50	142.5	~~147.5~~	—	142.5	190	~~195~~	~~195~~	190	332.5
14	Dieudonné Takou (CMR)	B	111.65	140	~~150~~	~~150~~	140	~~190~~	190	~~195~~	190	330
15	Rolando Marchinares (PER)	B	127.80	142.5	~~150~~	~~150~~	142.5	182.5	~~192.5~~	~~192.5~~	182.5	325
—	Gilbert Ojadi Aduche (NGR)	A	119.45	~~160~~	~~160~~	~~165~~	—	—	—	—	—	—
—	Jiri Zubricky (TCH)	A	164.95	~~185~~	~~185~~	~~185~~	—	—	—	—	—	—
—	Giannis Tsintsaris (GRE)	A	131.55									INJ

Note: INJ — Injured

== Sources ==
- The Official Report of the Games of the XXIV Olympiad Seoul 1988 Volume Two (PDF). p. 646.
