= Khalid Rahilou =

French-Moroccan boxer (born 1966)

Personal information
- Nationality: Moroccan; French
- Born: June 19, 1966 (age 60) Argenteuil, France
- Height: 5 ft 8 in (173 cm)
- Weight: Light welterweight

Boxing career
- Reach: 71 in (180 cm)
- Stance: Orthodox

Boxing record
- Total fights: 42
- Wins: 37
- Win by KO: 16
- Losses: 5

Khalid Rahilou (born 19 June 1966) is a French-Moroccan former professional boxer and kickboxer. He held the WBA light-welterweight world title between 1997 and 1998, and the EBU European title between 1994 and 1995.

== Kickboxing career ==
=== Amateur career ===
Khalil participated in the W.A.K.O. World Championships, defeating German fighter Klemens Willner by decision and defeated the American fighter Tommy Williams by decision to win the 1987 WAKO World Championship Full Contact - 63.5 kg Gold Medal.

=== Professional career ===
After winning the World Kickboxing Association Title, he defended it against Ramon Dekkers winning a 12 round fight by unanimous decision in 1989. as a side not this was Dekkers first and only 12 round fight and first and only fight with above the waist kicks.

In 1993 he fought for the belt again against Troy Dorsey in a 12 round fight winning by unanimous decision.

== Boxing career ==
=== Amateur career ===
Rahilou compiled an amateur record of 45 wins, 7 losses and 12 knockouts. He represented Morocco in the 1988 Olympics in the light welterweight division. His results were:

- Defeated Avaavau Avaavau (Western Samoa) – RSC 3
- Lost to Todd Foster (USA) – KO 2

=== Professional career ===
Rahilou began his professional career in 1988 and won his first major regional championship—the European light-welterweight title—in 1994. He later became world champion by winning the WBA light-welterweight title from Frankie Randall in 1997. Rahilou defended the title twice before losing it to Sharmba Mitchell in 1998. Following a loss to Souleymane M'baye in 2002, Rahilou retired from the sport.

== Titles and accomplishments ==
=== Kickboxing ===
==== Professional ====
- 2 time World Kickboxing Association Champion (1 defense)

==== Amateur ====
- World Association of Kickboxing Organizations
  - 1987 W.A.K.O. World Championships in Munich Full-Contact -63.5 kg (gold)

=== Boxing ===
- WBA Champion (2 defenses)
- European Boxing Union Champion(5 defenses)
- WBA Intercontinental Champion
- 2 Time French Champion

== Professional boxing record ==
42 fights	37 wins	5 losses
By knockout	16	3
By decision	21	2

No.	Result	Record	Opponent	Type	Round, time	Date	Location	Notes
42	Loss	37–5	Souleymane M'baye	UD	12 (12)	2002-05-23	Palais Marcel Cerdan, Levallois-Perret, France	Lost WBA Inter-Continental light-welterweight title
41	Win	37–4	Ferenc Szakallas	TKO	1 (12)	2001-09-15	Telde, Spain	Won vacant WBA Inter-Continental light-welterweight title
40	Win	36–4	Brice Faradji	SD	8 (8)	2001-06-23	Massy, France	
39	Win	35–4	Jean Marc Linguet	PTS	8 (8)	2001-02-16	Mont-de-Marsan, France	
38	Win	34–4	Freddy Cruz	PTS	8 (8)	2000-08-12	Marigot, Saint Martin	
37	Win	33–4	Jozef Kubovsky	TKO	2 (8)	2000-04-08	Palais Omnisport de Paris-Bercy, Bercy, France	
36	Loss	32–4	Thomas Damgaard	KO	4 (12)	1999-04-16	K.B. Hallen, Copenhagen, Denmark	For European light-welterweight title
35	Loss	32–3	Sharmba Mitchell	UD	12 (12)	1998-10-10	Palais Omnisport de Paris-Bercy, Bercy, France	Lost WBA light-welterweight title
34	Win	32–2	Jean Baptiste Mendy	UD	12 (12)	1998-02-21	Palais Omnisport de Paris-Bercy, Bercy, France	Retained WBA light-welterweight title
33	Win	31–2	Silvio Walter Rojas	SD	8 (8)	1997-10-04	Le Grand Dôme, Villebon-sur-Yvette, France	
32	Win	30–2	Marty Jakubowski	TKO	7 (12)	1997-07-05	Salle Mohammed V, Casablanca, Morocco	Retained WBA light-welterweight title
31	Win	29–2	Frankie Randall	TKO	11 (12)	1997-01-11	Nashville Arena, Nashville, Tennessee, U.S.	Won WBA light-welterweight title
30	Win	28–2	Angel Fernandez	KO	3 (6)	1996-08-21	La Palestre, Le Cannet, France	
29	Win	27–2	Rodney Wilson	PTS	8 (8)	1996-04-20	Palais Marcel Cerdan, Levallois-Perret, France	
28	Win	26–2	Eric Jakubowski	PTS	6 (6)	1996-03-10	Paris, France	
27	Win	25–2	Søren Søndergaard	TKO	9 (12)	1995-09-08	Aalborghallen, Aalborg, Denmark	Retained European light-welterweight title
26	Win	24–2	Pasquale Perna	UD	12 (12)	1995-07-18	Val Thorens, France	Retained European light-welterweight title
25	Win	23–2	Gert Bo Jacobsen	TKO	9 (12)	1995-04-28	Arena Randers, Randers, Denmark	Retained European light-welterweight title
24	Win	22–2	Patrick Ballesta	TKO	7 (12)	1995-02-04	Palais des Sports, Castelnau-le-Lez, France	Retained European light-welterweight title
23	Win	21–2	Gert Bo Jacobsen	TKO	3 (12)	1994-11-11	Arena Randers, Randers, Denmark	Retained European light-welterweight title
22	Win	20–2	Mario Morales	PTS	8 (8)	1994-10-01	Arena de Cosets, Carpentras, France	
21	Win	19–2	Valery Kayumba	UD	12 (12)	1994-06-04	Palais Marcel Cerdan, Levallois-Perret, France	Won European light-welterweight title
20	Win	18–2	Eduardo Jaquez	PTS	8 (8)	1994-05-07	Levallois-Perret, France	
19	Win	17–2	Patrick Ballesta	PTS	10 (10)	1994-02-12	Cergy-Pontoise, France	Won vacant French light-welterweight title
18	Win	16–2	Jean Marc Linguet	PTS	8 (8)	1993-12-20	Paris, France	
17	Loss	15–2	Christian Merle	KO	8 (10)	1993-06-25	Clermont-Ferrand, France	Lost French light-welterweight title
16	Win	15–1	Jean Marc Linguet	RTD	7 (?)	1993-05-08	Cergy-Pontoise, France	
15	Win	14–1	Darren McGrew	TKO	8 (8)	1993-02-06	Cirque d'hiver, Paris, France	
14	Win	13–1	Raffaele Paoletti	TKO	1 (?)	1992-11-07	Differdange, Luxembourg	
13	Win	12–1	Mark Hammon	PTS	8 (8)	1992-09-26	Paris, France	
12	Win	11–1	Arturo Nina	PTS	6 (6)	1992-09-05	Paris, France	
11	Win	10–1	Madjid Madhjoub	TKO	3 (10)	1992-06-13	Palais Marcel Cerdan, Levallois-Perret, France	Won vacant French light-welterweight title
10	Win	9–1	Roland LeClercq	TKO	4 (?)	1992-04-23	Cirque d'hiver, Paris, France	
9	Win	8–1	Mike Powell	PTS	8 (8)	1992-03-12	Cirque d'hiver, Paris, France	
8	Win	7–1	Lofti Ben Sayel	TKO	7 (8)	1992-01-30	Paris, France	
7	Win	6–1	Laroussi Trabelsi	UD	8 (8)	1991-12-19	Paris, France	
6	Win	5–1	Georges Elame	PTS	6 (6)	1991-10-25	Paris, France	
5	Loss	4–1	Karim Rabbi	TKO	1 (10)	1991-06-19	Paris, France	For vacant French light-welterweight title
4	Win	4–0	Jean Pierre Scigliano	PTS	8 (8)	1991-04-17	Paris, France	
3	Win	3–0	Roland LeClercq	TKO	3 (8)	1991-03-09	Conflans-Sainte-Honorine, France	
2	Win	2–0	Mourad Mezouari	PTS	6 (6)	1991-01-26	Criel-sur-Mer, France	
1	Win	1–0	Mohammed Chebab	PTS	6 (6)	1988-12-10	Conflans-sur-Anille, France	

== Post career ==
- Khalid Rahilou is considered to be the greatest Morocco Boxer of all time and is considered in the top 20 of the greatest French male boxers of all time.

== See also ==
- List of world light-welterweight boxing champions

Sporting positions
Regional boxing titles
Vacant Title last held by Karim Rabbi	French light-welterweight champion June 13, 1992 – June 25, 1993	Succeeded by Christian Merle
Vacant Title last held by Christian Merle	French light-welterweight champion February 12, 1994 – June 4, 1994; Won European title	Vacant Title next held by Christian Merle
Preceded by Valery Kayumba	European light-welterweight champion June 4, 1994 – 1996; Vacated	Vacant Title next held by Søren Søndergaard
Vacant Title last held by Ricky Hatton	WBA Inter-Continental light-welterweight champion September 15, 2001 – May 23, 2002	Succeeded by Souleymane M'baye
World boxing titles
Preceded by Frankie Randall	WBA light-welterweight champion January 11, 1997 – October 10, 1998	Succeeded by Sharmba Mitchell
