= Maurys Charón =

Cuban weightlifter (born 1965)

Personal information
- Nationality: Cuban
- Born: 25 January 1965 (age 60)

Sport
- Sport: Weightlifting

Maurys Charón (born 25 January 1965) is a Cuban weightlifter. He competed in the men's heavyweight II event at the 1992 Summer Olympics.
