= José Horacio Villegas =

Colombian weightlifter (born 1969)

Personal information
- Full name: José Horacio Villegas Sarria
- Nationality: Colombian
- Born: 13 February 1969 (age 56)

Sport
- Sport: Weightlifting

José Horacio Villegas Sarria (born 13 February 1969) is a Colombian weightlifter. He competed in the men's featherweight event at the 1992 Summer Olympics.
