= Shlomo Niazov =

Israeli boxer

Shlomo Niazov (Hebrew: שלמה ניאזוב; born May 12, 1962) is an Israeli former Olympic boxer.

Niazov is Jewish, and was born in Tel Aviv, Israel.

== Boxing career ==
When Niazov competed in the Olympics, he was 5 ft 7.5 in (171.5 cm) tall, and weighed 132 lb (60 kg). He is left-handed.

Niazov competed for Israel at the 1984 Summer Olympics in Los Angeles, at the age of 22, in Boxing--Men's Lightweight, and came in tied for 33rd. Niazov was the first Israeli Olympic boxer.

== 1984 Olympic results ==
Below is the record of Shlomo Niazov, an Israeli lightweight boxer who competed at the 1984 Los Angeles Olympics:

- Round of 64: lost to Asif Dar (Pakistan) by decision, 0–5

== Professional boxing career ==
In 1985 and 1986, Niazov fought five professional matches as a super lightweight. He won four of them, all by knockout.

== Coaching career ==
In 2000, he and Tal Niazov founded the Israel Professional Boxing Organization (IPBO) in Raanana, Israel.

They operate Combined Martial Arts (CMA), which runs 12 gyms in Israel where some 500 people come to train in all kinds of martial arts and boxing. Their best students as of 2007 were Elad Shmouel, Ran Nakash, and Hagar Finer.
