= Emrol Phillip =

Grenadian boxer (born 1966)

Personal information
- Full name: Emrol Phillip
- Born: June 26, 1966 (age 59)

Sport
- Country: Grenada
- Sport: Boxing

Emrol Phillip (born 26 June 1966) is retired male amateur boxer from Grenada, who fought at the 1984 Summer Olympics in the men's lightweight division.
