= José Miguel Guzman =

Dominican Republic weightlifter (born 1956)

Personal information
- Nationality: Dominican
- Born: 19 May 1956 (age 69)

Sport
- Sport: Weightlifting

José Miguel Guzman Reynoso (born 19 May 1956) is a Dominican Republic weightlifter. He competed in the men's super heavyweight event at the 1988 Summer Olympics.
