= Víctor Ruiz (weightlifter) =

Mexican weightlifter (born 1957)

Personal information
- Full name: Víctor Manuel Ruiz Limones
- Born: 7 December 1957 (age 67); Piedras Negras, Coahuila, Mexico

Sport
- Sport: Weightlifting

Víctor Manuel Ruiz Limones (born 7 December 1957) is a Mexican weightlifter. He competed in the men's middle heavyweight event at the 1980 Summer Olympics.

== Major results ==
Year	Venue	Weight	Snatch (kg)					Clean & Jerk (kg)					Total	Rank
Year	Venue	Weight	1	2	3	Results	Rank	1	2	3	Results	Rank	Total	Rank
Representing Mexico
Olympic Games
1980	Moscow, Soviet Union	90 kg	135.0	~~140.0~~	~~140.0~~	135.0	13	~~165.0~~	165.0	~~172.5~~	165.0	12	300.0	12
Central American and Caribbean Games
1990	Mexico City, Mexico	100 kg	—	—	—	137.5	3rd place, bronze medalist(s)	—	—	—	170.0	3rd place, bronze medalist(s)	307.5	3rd place, bronze medalist(s)
1986	Santiago de los Caballeros, Dominican Republic	100 kg	—	—	—	135.0	2nd place, silver medalist(s)	—	—	—	165.0	3rd place, bronze medalist(s)	300.0	3rd place, bronze medalist(s)
