= Lóránt Szabó =

Hungarian boxer

Personal information
- Nationality: Hungarian
- Born: 28 August 1966 (age 58); Pécs, Hungary

Sport
- Sport: Boxing

Lóránt Szabó (born 28 August 1966) is a Hungarian boxer. He competed in the men's light welterweight event at the 1988 Summer Olympics.
