= José Roque =

Cuban baseball player (born 1909)

- Right fielder
- Born: 1909; Havana, Cuba
- Died: 2000 (aged 91); Cuba
- Batted: Unknown Threw: Unknown

Negro league baseball debut
- 1929, for the Cuban Stars (West)

Last appearance
- 1929, for the Cuban Stars (West)

Negro National League I statistics
- Batting average: .253
- Home runs: 3
- Runs batted in: 19
- Stolen bases: 3
- Stats at Baseball Reference

Teams
- Cuban Stars (West) (1929)

José Roque (1909 – 2000) was a Cuban professional baseball right fielder who played in the Negro leagues in 1929.

A native of Havana, Cuba, Roque played 43 games for the Cuban Stars (West) in 1929. In his only season of professional baseball, he posted 38 hits and 13 walks in 163 plate appearances and 150 at bats for a batting average of .253 and an on-base percentage (OBP) of .313. Roque hit 3 home runs, had 19 runs batted in (RBI) and 3 stolen bases.
