= Anoumou Aguiar =

Togolese boxer (born 1965)

Personal information
- Nationality: Togolese
- Born: 27 January 1965 (age 60)
- Height: 1.72 m (5 ft 8 in)
- Weight: 67 kg (148 lb)

Sport
- Sport: Boxing

Honoré Anoumou Aguiar (born 27 January 1965) is a Togolese boxer. He competed in the 1988 Summer Olympics.
