= José Antonio Hernando =

Spanish boxer (born 1963)

José Antonio Hernando de Juana (born January 30, 1963) is a retired boxer from Spain, who represented his native country at the 1984 Summer Olympics in Los Angeles. There he was stopped in the quarterfinals of the lightweight division (– 51 kg) by Puerto Rico's eventual silver medalist Luis Ortiz.
