= Fahri Sümer =

Turkish boxer

Personal information
- Nationality: Turkish
- Born: 10 December 1958 (age 66)

Sport
- Sport: Boxing

Fahri Sümer (born 10 December 1958) is a Turkish boxer. He competed in the men's lightweight event at the 1984 Summer Olympics.
