= Slobodan Pavlović =

Yugoslav boxer (born 1960)

Personal information
- Nationality: Yugoslav
- Born: 1 July 1960 (age 64)

Sport
- Sport: Boxing

Slobodan Pavlović (born 1 July 1960) is a Yugoslav boxer. He competed in the men's lightweight event at the 1984 Summer Olympics.
