= Jhapat Singh Bhujel =

Nepalese boxer

Personal information
- Nationality: Nepalese
- Born: 1968 (age 56–57)

Sport
- Sport: Boxing

Jhapat Singh Bhujel (born 1968) is a Nepalese boxer. He competed in the men's light welterweight event at the 1988 Summer Olympics.
