= John Bergman =

American weightlifter (born 1962)

Personal information
- Nationality: American
- Born: June 7, 1962 (age 64)

Sport
- Sport: Weightlifting

John Bergman (born June 7, 1962) is an American former weightlifter. He competed in the men's super heavyweight event at the 1988 Summer Olympics.
