= Gordon Carew =

Guyanese boxer

Personal information
- Nationality: Guyanese
- Born: 21 October 1965 (age 59)

Sport
- Sport: Boxing

Gordon Carew (born 21 October 1965) is a Guyanese boxer. He competed in the men's lightweight event at the 1984 Summer Olympics.

His younger brother, Dillon Carew, also represented Guyana, boxing in the light welterweight division at the 1992 Summer Olympics.
