= Andrzej Możdżeń =

Polish boxer

Personal information
- Nationality: Polish
- Born: 7 July 1962 (age 62); Morąg, Poland

Sport
- Sport: Boxing

Andrzej Możdżeń (born 7 July 1962) is a Polish boxer. He competed in the men's light welterweight event at the 1988 Summer Olympics.
