= Lino Elias =

Cuban weightlifter (born 1966)

Personal information
- Full name: Lino Emerido Elías Ocaña
- Nationality: Cuban
- Born: 16 March 1966 (age 59)

Sport
- Sport: Weightlifting

Lino Emerido Elías Ocaña (born 16 March 1966) is a Cuban weightlifter. He competed in the men's light heavyweight event at the 1992 Summer Olympics.

Elías Ocaña won weightlifting gold at the 1993 Central American and Caribbean Games in Puerto Rico. Following the games, he defected to the United States with at least 30 other Cuban athletes.
