= Tomás Ruiz (boxer) =

Spanish boxer

Personal information
- Nationality: Spanish
- Born: 17 September 1967 (age 58)

Sport
- Sport: Boxing

Tomás Ruiz (born 17 September 1967) is a Spanish boxer. He competed in the men's light welterweight event at the 1988 Summer Olympics.
