= Geofrey Nyeko =

Ugandan boxer

Personal information
- Nationality: Ugandan
- Born: 2 February 1959 (age 66)

Sport
- Sport: Boxing

Geofrey Nyeko (born 2 February 1959) is a Ugandan boxer. He competed at the 1980 Summer Olympics and the 1984 Summer Olympics. At the 1980 Summer Olympics, he lost to Richard Nowakowski of East Germany.
