= Buala Sasakul =

Thai boxer

Personal information
- Born: บัวลา•สาสกุล
- Weight: 60 kg (132 lb)

Boxing career

Boxing record
- Total fights: 1
- Wins: 0
- Losses: 1

Buala Sasakul (born 21 October 1960) is a Thai boxer. He competed in the men's lightweight event at the 1984 Summer Olympics.
