= Alex Dickson (boxer) =

Scottish boxer (born 1962)

Personal information
- Born: Alexander Dickson; 1 October 1962 (age 63) Bellshill, Lanarkshire, Scotland
- Height: 5 ft 9 in (175 cm)
- Weight: Lightweight, light welterweight

Boxing career
- Stance: Orthodox

Boxing record
- Total fights: 22
- Wins: 18
- Win by KO: 4
- Losses: 3
- Draws: 1
Medal record
Men's boxing
Representing Scotland
Commonwealth Championships
Gold medal – first place	1983 Belfast	Light Welterweight

Alexander Dickson (born 1 October 1962) is a Scottish former boxer who represented Great Britain at the 1984 Summer Olympics and in his professional career was British lightweight champion between 1987 and 1988.

== Career ==
=== Amateur ===
Born in Bellshill and fighting out of the Larkhall ABC, Dickson won the ABA lightweight title in 1984 and represented Great Britain at the Olympics that year in Los Angeles, losing to eventual silver medallist Luis Ortíz of Puerto Rico in the third round.

=== Professional ===
Dickson made his professional debut in January 1985, a points win over Tyrell Wilson. After winning his first 13 fights he faced Tony Willis in September 1987 for the latter's British lightweight title. Dickson took a points decision to become British champion. He made his first defence of the title in February 1988 against fellow Scot Steve Boyle, with the Scottish Area title also at stake; Boyle knocked Dickson out in the second round.

Dickson won three of his next four fights, and after moving up to light welterweight, challenged for Tim Burgess's WBA Inter-Continental title in November 1989, the fight ending in a draw. Dickson returned in May 1990 with a win over Dave Pierre, and in September met Tony Ekubia for the latter's Commonwealth title and the vacant British title. Ekubia knocked Dickson out in the eleventh round. This proved to be Dickson's final fight.

Dickson's identical twin brother John was also a professional boxer.
