= Calvin Stamp =

Jamaican weightlifter (1958–2018)

Personal information
- Full name: Calvin Washington Stamp
- Nationality: Jamaican
- Born: 25 June 1958
- Died: 30 December 2018 (aged 60) DeKalb County, Georgia, United States

Sport
- Sport: Weightlifting

Calvin Washington Stamp (25 June 1958 – 30 December 2018) was a Jamaican weightlifter. He competed at the 1984 Summer Olympics and the 1988 Summer Olympics.

On 30 December 2018, he died in a car accident in DeKalb County, Georgia.

== Major results ==
Year	Venue	Weight	Snatch (kg)					Clean & Jerk (kg)					Total	Rank
Year	Venue	Weight	1	2	3	Results	Rank	1	2	3	Results	Rank	Total	Rank
Representing Jamaica
Olympic Games
1988	Seoul, South Korea	+110 kg	145.0	~~150.0~~	150.0	150.0	12	185.0	~~192.5~~	195.0	195.0	10	345.0	11
1984	Los Angeles, United States	110 kg	135.0	140.0	~~145.0~~	140.0	12	180.0	~~185.0~~	~~187.5~~	180.0	10	320.0	9
Pan American Games
1987	Indianapolis, United States	+110 kg	—N/a	—N/a	—N/a	145.0	3rd place, bronze medalist(s)	—N/a	—N/a	—N/a	187.5	3rd place, bronze medalist(s)	332.5	3rd place, bronze medalist(s)
Commonwealth Games
1990	Auckland, New Zealand	+110 kg	—N/a	—N/a	—N/a	150.0	7	—N/a	—N/a	—N/a	—	—	—	—
Central American and Caribbean Games
1986	Santiago de los Caballeros, Dominican Republic	+110 kg	—N/a	—N/a	—N/a	145.0	2nd place, silver medalist(s)	—N/a	—N/a	—N/a	175.0	2nd place, silver medalist(s)	320.0	2nd place, silver medalist(s)
