= Borislav Abadzhiev =

Bulgarian boxer (born 1963)

Personal information
- Born: October 14, 1963 (age 62) Vidin
Medal record
Men's Boxing
Representing Bulgaria
World Amateur Championships
Bronze medal – third place	1986 Reno	Light-Welterweight
European Amateur Championships
Gold medal – first place	1987 Turin	Light-Welterweight
Silver medal – second place	1989 Athens	Welterweight
Bronze medal – third place	1985 Budapest	Welterweight

Borislav Stefanov Abadzhiev (Bulgarian: Борислав Стефанов Абаджиев; born October 14, 1963, in Vidin) is a retired boxer from Bulgaria, who competed for his native country at the 1988 Summer Olympics in Seoul, South Korea. There he was defeated in the first round of the Men's Light-Welterweight Division (– 63,5 kg) by Yugoslavia's Vukašin Dobrašinović. He is best known for winning the European title in 1987.
