= Hernán Gutiérrez =

Colombian boxer

Personal information
- Nationality: Colombian
- Born: 11 November 1964 (age 60)

Sport
- Sport: Boxing

Hernán Gutiérrez (born 11 November 1964) is a Colombian boxer. He competed in the men's lightweight event at the 1984 Summer Olympics.
