= Søren Søndergaard (boxer) =

Danish boxer (born 1966)

Personal information
- Nickname: Mr Perfect
- Nationality: Danish
- Born: Søren Søndergaard; 17 September 1966 (age 59) Nørager, Nordjylland), Denmark
- Weight: Super-lightweight; Welterweight

Boxing career
- Stance: Orthodox

Boxing record
- Total fights: 41
- Wins: 39
- Win by KO: 24
- Losses: 1
- Draws: 1

Søren Fjordback Søndergaard (born 17 September 1966) is a Danish former professional boxer. As an Amateur he won the bronze medal at the 1987 European Championships in Turin, Italy in the Men's Light Welterweight (– 63.5 kg) division. Nicknamed Mr. Perfect he represented his native country at the 1988 Summer Olympics in Seoul, South Korea, losing in the first round to eventual gold medalist Vyacheslav Yanovskiy.

== 1988 Olympic results ==
Below is the record of Soren Sondergaard, a Danish Light welterweight boxer who competed at the 1988 Seoul Olympics:

- Round of 64: lost to Vyacheslav Yanovskiy (Soviet Union) referee stopped contest in the second round

== Professional career ==
During his professional career he held the European Super Lightweight Title and the International Boxing Council Super Lightweight and Welterweight Titles. He recorded victories over world champions Michele Piccirillo, Livingstone Bramble and Carlos Baldomir, his only professional loss coming in a European title fight with future WBA World Super-Lightweight champion Khalid Rahilou.
