= Ricardo Salas =

Panamanian weightlifter

Personal information
- Nationality: Panamanian

Sport
- Sport: Weightlifting

Ricardo Salas is a Panamanian weightlifter. He competed in the men's light heavyweight event at the 1984 Summer Olympics.
