= Raúl Mora =

Cuban weightlifter (born 1969)

Personal information
- Born: 10 April 1969 (age 56); Santiago de Cuba, Cuba

Sport
- Sport: Weightlifting

Raúl Mora (born 10 April 1969) is a Cuban weightlifter. He competed in the men's middleweight event at the 1992 Summer Olympics.
