= José Heredia (weightlifter) =

Cuban weightlifter (born 1969)

Personal information
- Nationality: Cuban
- Born: 21 February 1969 (age 56)

Sport
- Sport: Weightlifting

José Heredia (born 21 February 1969) is a Cuban weightlifter. He competed in the men's light heavyweight event at the 1992 Summer Olympics.
