= Anthony Mwamba =

Zambian boxer (1960–2021)

Personal information
- Nationality: Zambian
- Born: 6 June 1960 solwezi, zambia
- Died: 21 January 2021 (aged 60) Lusaka, Zambia

Sport
- Sport: Boxing
Medal record
Men's boxing
Representing Zambia
Commonwealth Games
Bronze medal – third place	1990 Auckland	Welterweight

Anthony Mwamba (8 August 1960 – 21 January 2021) was a Zambian boxer. He competed in the men's light welterweight event at the 1988 Summer Olympics. Mwamba won a bronze medal in the welterweight (67 kg) division at the 1990 Commonwealth Games. He died of COVID-19 during the pandemic in Zambia.
