= Tolentino Murillo =

Colombian weightlifter (born 1967)

Personal information
- Nationality: Colombian
- Born: 29 August 1967 (age 57)

Sport
- Sport: Weightlifting

Tolentino Murillo (born 29 August 1967) is a Colombian weightlifter. He competed in the men's featherweight event at the 1988 Summer Olympics.
