= Christopher Ossai =

Nigerian boxer (born 1957)

Personal information
- Born: 1 April 1957 (age 69)
Medal record
Men's Boxing
Representing Nigeria
Commonwealth Games
Gold medal – first place	1982 Brisbane	Light Welterweight
All-Africa Games
Bronze medal – third place	1978 Algiers	Featherweight

Christopher Ossai (born 1 April 1957) is a Nigerian boxer. He competed at the 1980 Summer Olympics in Moscow, and at the 1984 Summer Olympics in Los Angeles, both times in the lightweight class.

As a professional, he held the African lightweight title from 1991 to 1993 when he was stripped.

== 1980 Olympic results ==
Below is the record of Christopher Ossai, a Nigerian lightweight boxer who competed in the 1980 Moscow Olympics:

- Round of 16: lost to Richard Nowakowsi (East Germany) on points, 0-5
