= Kim Gwi-sik =

South Korean weightlifter

Personal information
- Nationality: South Korean
- Born: 16 February 1969 (age 56)

Sport
- Sport: Weightlifting

Kim Gwi-sik (born 16 February 1969) is a South Korean weightlifter. He competed at the 1988 Summer Olympics and the 1992 Summer Olympics.
