= Vukašin Dobrašinović =

Montenegrin boxer (born 1964)

Personal information
- Nationality: Montenegrin
- Born: 15 July 1964 (age 61) Berane, Yugoslavia

Sport
- Sport: Boxing

Vukašin Dobrašinović (born 15 July 1964) is a Montenegrin boxer. He competed in the men's light welterweight event at the 1988 Summer Olympics.
