= Renato Cornett =

Australian boxer

Personal information
- Nationality: Australian
- Born: 12 June 1965 (age 60); Varaždin, Yugoslavia

Sport
- Sport: Boxing

Renato Cornett (born 12 June 1965 Varaždin, Croatia) is an Australian boxer of Croatian origin. He competed in the men's lightweight event at the 1984 Summer Olympics.
