= Nicolas Mercado =

Colombian weightlifter

Personal information
- Nationality: Colombian
- Born: 10 July 1960 (age 64)

Sport
- Sport: Weightlifting

Nicolas Mercado (born 10 July 1960) is a Colombian weightlifter. He competed in the men's bantamweight event at the 1984 Summer Olympics.
