= Oscar Penagos =

Colombian weightlifter (born 1964)

Personal information
- Nationality: Colombian
- Born: 2 August 1964 (age 60)

Sport
- Sport: Weightlifting

Oscar Penagos (born 2 August 1964) is a Colombian former weightlifter. He competed at the 1984 Summer Olympics and the 1988 Summer Olympics.
