= Gilberto Mercado =

Colombian weightlifter

Personal information
- Nationality: Colombian
- Born: 2 May 1962 (age 62)

Sport
- Sport: Weightlifting

Gilberto Mercado (born 2 May 1962) is a Colombian former weightlifter. He competed in the men's middleweight event at the 1984 Summer Olympics.
