= Tómas Rodríguez (weightlifter) =

Panamanian weightlifter (born 1962)

Personal information
- Nationality: Panamanian
- Born: 1 April 1962 (age 63)

Sport
- Sport: Weightlifting

Tómas Rodríguez Ortiz (born 1 April 1962) is a Panamanian weightlifter. He competed at the 1984 Summer Olympics and the 1988 Summer Olympics.
