= Bakary Fofana (boxer) =

Ivorian boxer (born 1966)

Bakary Fofana (born 20 October 1966) is a former boxer in the 1984 and 1988 Summer Olympics who represented the Côte d'Ivoire.

== 1988 Olympic results ==
Below is the record of Bakary Fofana, a featherweight boxer from the Ivory Coast who competed at the 1988 Seoul Olympics:

- Round of 64 lost to Wataru Yamada (Japan) referee stopped contest in first round
