= Matilde Ceballos =

Panamanian weightlifter (born 1957)

Personal information
- Nationality: Panamanian
- Born: 14 March 1957 (age 69)

Sport
- Sport: Weightlifting

Matilde Ceballos (born 14 March 1957) is a Panamanian weightlifter. She competed in the men's featherweight event at the 1992 Summer Olympics.
