= Chun Jin-chul =

Korean male boxer (born 1967)

Personal information
- Nationality: South Korean
- Born: 16 September 1967 (age 57)

Sport
- Sport: Boxing

Chun Jin-chul (born 16 September 1967) is a South Korean boxer. He competed at the 1988 Summer Olympics and the 1992 Summer Olympics.
