= Enrique Sabari =

Cuban weightlifter (born 1965)

Enrique Urbano Sabari Gaitén (born May 25, 1965 in Camagüey) is a retired male weightlifter from Cuba. He competed for Cuba at the 1996 Summer Olympics, finishing in 12th place in the overall rankings of the men's middle-heavyweight division (– 91 kg). The other Cuban competitor in the same weight class was Carlos Alexis Hernández, who finished in sixth place.
