= William Letriz =

Puerto Rican weightlifter (born 1958)

Personal information
- Nationality: Puerto Rican
- Born: 20 May 1958 (age 67)

Sport
- Sport: Weightlifting

William Letriz (born 20 May 1958) is a Puerto Rican weightlifter. He competed at the 1984 Summer Olympics and the 1988 Summer Olympics.
