= Cristian Rivera (weightlifter) =

Dominican Republic weightlifter

Personal information
- Nationality: Dominican
- Born: 6 September 1963 (age 61)

Sport
- Sport: Weightlifting

Cristian Rivera (born 6 September 1963) is a Dominican Republic former weightlifter. He competed in the men's bantamweight event at the 1988 Summer Olympics.
