= 1983 Pan American Games =

9th edition of the Pan American Games

IX Pan American Games
- Host: Caracas, Venezuela
- Nations: 36
- Athletes: 3,426
- Events: 269 in 23 sports
- Opening: August 14
- Closing: August 29
- Opened by: President Luis Herrera Campins
- Cauldron lighter: Francisco Rodríguez
- Main venue: Estadio Olímpico

The 1983 Pan American Games, officially known as the IX Pan American Games (Spanish: IX Juegos Panamericanos) and commonly known as Caracas 1983, were held in Caracas, Venezuela from August 14 to August 29, 1983. The games were the first major international competition to include relatively accurate steroid testing.

== Host city selection ==
Four cities submitted bids to host the 1983 Pan American Games that were recognized by the Pan American Sports Organization (PASO); however, only one city, Hamilton, Ontario submitted their bid on time. On 23 April 1977, Caracas, Venezuela was selected over Hamilton, Canada in a two-city vote to host the IX Pan American Games by the PASO at its general assembly in San Juan, Puerto Rico.

== Medal count ==
^{1}	Host nation

To sort this table by nation, total medal count, or any other column, click on the icon next to the column title.

Rank	Nation	Gold	Silver	Bronze	Total
1	United States ^{a}	137/148	92/101	56/53	285/302
2	Cuba ^{a}	79/78/80	53/51/49	43/45	175/174
3	Canada ^{a}	18/22	44/42	47/55	109/119
4	Brazil	14	20	23	57
5	Venezuela ^{1} ^{a}	12/14	26/25	35/37	73/76

== Sports ==
These links lead to articles discussing the events of the respective discipline at the 1983 Pan American Games

- Archery
- Athletics
- Baseball
- Basketball
- Boxing
- Cycling
- Diving
- Equestrian
- Fencing
- Football (soccer)
- Gymnastics
- Field Hockey
- Judo
- Rowing
- Sailing
- Shooting
- Softball
- Sambo
- Swimming
- Synchronized swimming
- Table tennis
- Tennis
- Volleyball
- Water polo
- Weightlifting
- Wrestling

== Doping ==
Doping positives
Athlete	Nation	Sport	Prohibited substance	Note
Daniel Núñez	Cuba	Weightlifting	Anabolic steroid	
Alberto Blanco	Cuba	Weightlifting	Anabolic steroid	
Jeff Michels	United States	Weightlifting	Anabolic steroid	
Guy Greavette	Canada	Weightlifting	Anabolic steroid	
Jacques Oligier	Chile	Weightlifting	Anabolic steroid	
Michael Vian	Canada	Weightlifting	Anabolic steroid	
Enrique Montiel	Nicaragua	Weightlifting	Anabolic steroid	
José Adarmes	Venezuela	Weightlifting	Anabolic steroid	
Mario Durruty	Cuba	Fencing	Anabolic steroid	
Juan Núñez	Dominican Republic	Athletics	Fencamfamine	
Francisco López	Argentina	Weightlifting	Anabolic steroid	
Caballero Dolcey	Colombia	Weightlifting	Anabolic steroid	
Fernando Vera	Chile	Cycling	Anabolic steroid	
Lázaro Beltrán	Cuba	Volleyball	Ephedrine	
Juan De la Cruz	Dominican Republic	Athletics	Anabolic steroid	
José Lozada	Puerto Rico	Weightlifting	Anabolic steroid	

== Mascot ==
The 1983 Games' mascot was a lion holding a 1983 sign named Santiaguito.

Preceded by San Juan	IX Pan American Games; Caracas (1983)	Succeeded by Indianapolis
