= Lars Myrberg =

Swedish boxer

Personal information
- Full name: Lars Mikael Myrberg
- Nationality: Sweden
- Born: 23 November 1964 (age 61) Stockholm, Sweden
- Height: 1.75 m (5 ft 9 in)
- Weight: 63 kg (139 lb)

Sport
- Sport: Boxing
- Weight class: Light Welterweight
- Club: Djurgårdens IF
Medal record
Olympic Games
Bronze medal – third place	1988 Seoul	Light Welterweight

Lars Mikael Myrberg (born 23 November 1964) is a Swedish former boxer who won a light welterweight bronze medal at the 1988 Summer Olympics.

Myrberg represented Djurgårdens IF.

== 1988 Olympic record ==
Below is the record of Lars Myrberg, a Swedish light welterweight boxer who competed at the 1988 Seoul Olympics:

- Round of 64: defeated Handhal al-Harithy (Oman) referee stopped contest in first round
- Round of 32: defeated Ahmed Khanji (Syria) by decision, 4–1
- Round of 16: Defeated Howard Grant (Canada) by decision, 4–1
- Quarterfinal: defeated Humberto Rodriguez (Mexico) by first-round knockout
- Semifinal: lost to Grahame Cheney (Australia) by decision, 0-5 (was awarded bronze medal)

== Professional career ==
Myrberg turned pro in 1996 and fought only one bout. He defeated Shaba Edwards by technical knockout in a bout held in Denmark. Myrberg retired with a record of 1–0–0.

== Sources ==
- Boxing record for Lars Myrberg from BoxRec (registration required)
- sports-reference
