= Ludovic Proto =

French boxer (born 1965)

Personal information
- Born: 30 April 1965 (age 61) Pointe-à-Pitre, Guadeloupe
- Height: 5 ft 9 in (1.75 m)
- Weight: Light flyweight

Boxing career
- Stance: Southpaw

Boxing record
- Total fights: 41
- Wins: 36
- Win by KO: 23
- Losses: 5

Ludovic Proto (born 30 April 1965 in Pointe-a-Pitre, Guadeloupe) is a French former professional boxer who competed from 1989 to 1998. At welterweight, he held the European and French titles. He challenged for the European light middleweight title in 1994. As an amateur, he represented France at the 1988 Summer Olympics in the men's light welterweight division .
