= List of flag bearers for Nicaragua at the Olympics =

Nicaragua at the Olympics
- IOC code: NCA
- NOC: Comité Olímpico Nicaragüense
- Website: www.con.org.ni
- Medals: Gold 0 Silver 0 Bronze 0 Total 0

Summer appearances
- 1968; 1972; 1976; 1980; 1984; 1988; 1992; 1996; 2000; 2004; 2008; 2012; 2016; 2020; 2024

This is a list of flag bearers who have represented Nicaragua at the Olympics.

Flag bearers carry the national flag of their country at the opening ceremony of the Olympic Games.

#	Event year	Season	Flag bearer	Sport	Ref.
1	1968	Summer	Don Vélez	Athletics	
2	1972	Summer	Don Vélez	Athletics	
3	1976	Summer	Frank Richardson	Swimming	
4	1980	Summer	Xiomara Larios	Athletics	
5	1984	Summer	Gustavo Herrera	Official	
6	1992	Summer	Magdiel Gutiérrez	Wrestling	
7	1996	Summer	Walter Martínez	Shooting	
8	2000	Summer	Walter Martínez	Shooting	
9	2004	Summer	Svitlana Kashchenko	Shooting	
10	2008	Summer	Alexis Argüello	Boxing (non-participant)	
11	2012	Summer	Osmar Bravo	Boxing	
12	2016	Summer	Rafael Lacayo	Shooting	
13	2020	Summer	Edwin Barberena	Shooting	
13	2020	Summer	Sema Ludrick	Weightlifting	
14	2024	Summer	Izayana Marenco	Judo	
14	2024	Summer	Gerald Hernandez	Swimming	

== See also ==
- Nicaragua at the Olympics
