= Nicaragua at the 1976 Summer Olympics =

- IOC code: NCA
- NOC: Comité Olímpico Nicaragüense

in Montreal
- Competitors: 15 in 6 sports
- Flag bearer: Frank Richardson
- Medals: Gold 0 Silver 0 Bronze 0 Total 0

Summer Olympics appearances (overview)
- 1968; 1972; 1976; 1980; 1984; 1988; 1992; 1996; 2000; 2004; 2008; 2012; 2016; 2020; 2024; 2028

Nicaragua competed at the 1976 Summer Olympics in Montreal, Quebec, Canada. Fifteen competitors, all men, took part in nineteen events in six sports.

== Athletics ==
Men's High Jump

- Carlos Abaunza

- Qualification – NM (→ did not advance)

== Cycling ==
Individual road race

- David Iornos – did not finish (→ no ranking)
- Hamblin González – did not finish (→ no ranking)
- Manuel Largaespada – did not finish (→ no ranking)
- Miguel Espinoza – did not finish (→ no ranking)

Team time trial

- David Iornos
- Hamblin González
- Manuel Largaespada
- Miguel Espinoza
