= Nicaragua at the 2020 Summer Olympics =

- IOC code: NCA
- NOC: Comité Olímpico Nicaragüense

in Tokyo, Japan July 23, 2021 – August 8, 2021
- Competitors: 8 in 6 sports
- Flag bearers (opening): Sema Ludrick; Edwin Barberena
- Flag bearer (closing): N/A
- Medals: Gold 0 Silver 0 Bronze 0 Total 0

Summer Olympics appearances (overview)
- 1968; 1972; 1976; 1980; 1984; 1988; 1992; 1996; 2000; 2004; 2008; 2012; 2016; 2020; 2024

Nicaragua competed at the 2020 Summer Olympics in Tokyo. Originally scheduled to take place from 24 July to 9 August 2020, the Games were postponed to 23 July to 8 August 2021, because of the COVID-19 pandemic. It was the nation's fourteenth appearance at the Summer Olympics, having competed at every Games since 1968 with the exception of the 1988 Summer Olympics in Seoul because of its partial support of the North Korean boycott.

== Competitors ==
The following is the list of number of competitors participating in the Games:

Sport	Men	Women	Total
Athletics	1	0	1
Judo	0	1	1
Rowing	1	1	2
Shooting	1	0	1
Swimming	1	1	2
Weightlifting	0	1	1
Total	4	4	8

== Athletics ==
Nicaragua received a universality slot from World Athletics to send a male track and field athlete to the Olympics.

Key

- Note–Ranks given for track events are within the athlete's heat only
- Q = Qualified for the next round
- q = Qualified for the next round as a fastest loser or, in field events, by position without achieving the qualifying target
- NR = National record
- N/A = Round not applicable for the event
- Bye = Athlete not required to compete in round

Track & road events

Athlete	Event	Heat		Quarterfinal		Semifinal		Final	
Athlete	Event	Result	Rank	Result	Rank	Result	Rank	Result	Rank
Yeykell Eliuth Romero	Men's 100 m	10.62	3 Q	10.70	8	Did not advance			

== Judo ==
Nicaragua qualified one judoka for the women's heavyweight category (+78 kg) at the Games, signifying the nation's return to the sport for the first time since Atlanta 1996. Izayana Marenco accepted a continental berth from the Americas as the nation's top-ranked judoka outside of direct qualifying position in the IJF World Ranking List of June 28, 2021.

Athlete	Event	Round of 32	Round of 16	Quarterfinals	Semifinals	Repechage	Final / BM	
Athlete	Event	Opposition Result	Opposition Result	Opposition Result	Opposition Result	Opposition Result	Opposition Result	Rank
Izayana Marenco	Women's +78 kg	Cerić (BIH); L 00–10	Did not advance					

== Rowing ==
Nicaragua qualified one boat in the men's single sculls for the Games after finishing fourth in the B-final and securing the third of five berths available at the 2021 FISA Americas Olympic Qualification Regatta in Rio de Janeiro, Brazil, marking the country's debut in the sport. An additional slot was awarded to another Nicaraguan rower competing in the women's single sculls, as the nation granted an invitation from the Tripartite Commission and the International Rowing Federation.

Athlete	Event	Heats		Repechage		Quarterfinals		Semifinals		Final	
Athlete	Event	Time	Rank	Time	Rank	Time	Rank	Time	Rank	Time	Rank
Felix Potoy	Men's single sculls	7:32.54	4 R	7:44.52	3 SE/F	Bye		7:45.02	1 FE	7:28.00	26
Evidelia González	Women's single sculls	8:25.18	4 R	8:37.55	3 SE/F	Bye		8:36.99	1 FE	8:10.87	27

Qualification Legend: FA=Final A (medal); FB=Final B (non-medal); FC=Final C (non-medal); FD=Final D (non-medal); FE=Final E (non-medal); FF=Final F (non-medal); SA/B=Semifinals A/B; SC/D=Semifinals C/D; SE/F=Semifinals E/F; QF=Quarterfinals; R=Repechage

== Shooting ==
Nicaragua received an invitation from the Tripartite Commission to send a men's air pistol shooter to the Olympics, as long as the minimum qualifying score (MQS) was fulfilled by June 5, 2021.

Athlete	Event	Qualification		Final	
Athlete	Event	Points	Rank	Points	Rank
Edwin Barberena	Men's 10 m air pistol	554	36	Did not advance	

== Swimming ==
Nicaragua received a universality invitation from FINA to send two top-ranked swimmers (one per gender) in their respective individual events to the Olympics, based on the FINA Points System of June 28, 2021.

Athlete	Event	Heat		Semifinal		Final	
Athlete	Event	Time	Rank	Time	Rank	Time	Rank
Miguel Mena	Men's 100 m freestyle	51.99	55	Did not advance			
Maria Schutzmeier	Women's 100 m freestyle	57.94	43	Did not advance			

== Weightlifting ==
Nicaragua entered one female weightlifter into the Olympic competition. Sema Nancy Loudrick topped the list of weightlifters from the Americas in the women's 64 kg category based on the IWF Absolute Continental Rankings.

Athlete	Event	Snatch		Clean & Jerk		Total	Rank
Athlete	Event	Result	Rank	Result	Rank	Total	Rank
Sema Ludrick	Women's –64 kg	87	13	115	11	202	12

== See also ==
- Nicaragua at the 2019 Pan American Games
