= Nicaragua at the 2023 Pan American Games =

- IOC code: NIC
- NOC: Nicaraguan Olympic Committee

in Santiago, Chile 20 October 2023 – 5 November 2023
- Competitors: 24 in 10 sports
- Flag bearers (opening): Orlando Vásquez & Sema Ludrick
- Flag bearer (closing): TBD
- Medals Ranked 24th: Gold 0 Silver 2 Bronze 0 Total 2

Pan American Games appearances (overview)
- 1951; 1955; 1959; 1963; 1967; 1971; 1975; 1979; 1983; 1987; 1991; 1995; 1999; 2003; 2007; 2011; 2015; 2019; 2023; 2027

Nicaragua competed at the 2023 Pan American Games in Santiago, Chile from October 20 to November 5, 2023. This will be Nicaragua's 16th appearance at the Pan American Games, having competed at every edition of the Games except 1955, 1963 and 1979.

The Nicaraguan team consisted of 24 athletes competing in ten sports. Weightlifters Orlando Vásquez and Sema Ludrick were the country's flagbearers during the opening ceremony.

== Medalists ==
The following Nicaraguan competitors won medals at the games. In the by discipline sections below, medalists' names are bolded.

Medal	Name	Sport	Event	Date
Silver	Elian Ortega	Taekwondo	Men's poomsae individual	October 21
Silver	Elian Ortega; Ingrid Darce	Taekwondo	Mixed poomsae pairs	October 22

== Competitors ==
The following is the list of number of competitors (per gender) participating at the games per sport/discipline.

Sport	Men	Women	Total
Judo	0	1	1
Karate	1	0	1
Rowing	1	3	4
Surfing	0	1	1
Taekwondo	2	1	3
Weightlifting	2	2	4
Total	6	8	14

== Judo ==
Nicaragua has qualified one female judoka.

Athlete	Event	Round of 16	Quarterfinals	Semifinals	Repechage	Final / BM	
Athlete	Event	Opposition Result	Opposition Result	Opposition Result	Opposition Result	Opposition Result	Rank
Izayana Marenco	Women's +78 kg	Bye	Urdaneta (VEN); **L** 00S3–10S1	Did not advance	Williams (USA); **W** 11–00S3	Bronze medal final Morillo (DOM); **L** 00S3–10S1	=5

== Karate ==
Nicaragua qualified one male karateka in the 2023 Central American and Caribbean Championship.

Kumite

Athlete	Event	Round robin				Semifinal	Final	
Athlete	Event	Opposition Result	Opposition Result	Opposition Result	Rank	Opposition Result	Opposition Result	Rank
Melvin Oporta	Men's +84 kg	Lenis (COL); **W** 7–3	Salgado (BRA); **L** 2–4	Timmermans (ARU); **L** 1–3	3	Did not advance		

== Rowing ==
Nicaragua qualified a team of 4 athletes (one man and three women).

Athlete	Event	Heat		Repechage		Semifinal		Final A/B	
Athlete	Event	Time	Rank	Time	Rank	Time	Rank	Time	Rank
Felix Potoy	Men's single sculls	7:54:03	5 **R**	7:30:89	3 **SA/B**	8:00.03	5 **FB**	7:58.59	12
Evidelia Gonzalez	Women's single sculls	8:49:96	5 **R**	8:16:68	2 **SA/B**	8:18:81	5 **FB**	8:20.42	9
María Isabel Vanegas; Evidelia Gonzalez	Women's pair	8:17:86	4 **R**	8:08.90	5 **FB**	—N/a		7:59.60	9

== Surfing ==
Nicaragua qualified a female surfer.

Artistic

Athlete	Event	Round 1	Round 2	Round 3	Round 4	Repechage 1	Repechage 2	Repechage 3	Repechage 4	Repechage 5	Repechage 6	Final / BM	
Athlete	Event	Opposition Result	Opposition Result	Opposition Result	Opposition Result	Opposition Result	Opposition Result	Opposition Result	Opposition Result	Opposition Result	Opposition Result	Opposition Result	Rank
Candelaria Resano	Women's shortboard	Pellizzari (ARG); **W** 11.50–6.77	Rosas (PER); **L** 8.14–11.40	Did not advance		Bye	Pellizzari (ARG); **W** 8.00–4.77	Dempfle-Olin (CAN); **L** 11.94–14.90	Did not advance				

== Taekwondo ==
Nicaragua qualified 3 athletes (two men and one woman) during the Pan American Games Qualification Tournament.

Kyorugi

Men

Athlete	Event	Round of 16	Quarterfinals	Semifinals	Repechage	Final/ BM	
Athlete	Event	Opposition Result	Opposition Result	Opposition Result	Opposition Result	Opposition Result	Rank
David Robleto	–80 kg	González (PUR); **W** 2–1	Salazar (MEX); **W** 2–1	Trejos (COL); **L** 0–2	Bye	Bronze medal final Ostapiv (BRA); **L** 0–2	=5

Poomsae (forms)

Athlete	Event	Round of 16	Quarterfinals	Semifinals	Final/ BM	
Athlete	Event	Opposition Result	Opposition Result	Opposition Result	Opposition Result	Rank
**Elian Ortega**	Men's individual	Bye	Do (USA); **W** 7.670–7.460	Colon (PUR); **W** 7.670–7.460	Arroyo (MEX); **L** 7.880–7.990	2nd place, silver medalist(s)
Ingrid Darce	Women's individual	Ho (CAN); **W** 1.0–WDR	Higueros (EAI); **L** 7.120–7.540	Did not advance		
**Elian Ortega**; **Ingrid Darce**	Mixed pair	—N/a			7.880	2nd place, silver medalist(s)

== Weightlifting ==
Nicaragua qualified four weightlifters (two men and two women).

Athlete	Event	Snatch		Clean & Jerk		Total	Rank
Athlete	Event	Result	Rank	Result	Rank	Total	Rank
Javiana Pavón	Women's 59 kg	75	11	97	=10	172	10
Sema Ludrick	Women's 71 kg	80	=12	110	11	190	12
