= Nicaragua at the 2019 Pan American Games =

- IOC code: NCA
- NOC: Nicaraguan Olympic Committee

in Lima, Peru 26 July–11 August, 2019
- Competitors: 60 in 13 sports
- Flag bearer: Swan Mendoza (opening)
- Medals Ranked 29th: Gold 0 Silver 0 Bronze 3 Total 3

Pan American Games appearances (overview)
- 1951; 1955; 1959; 1963; 1967; 1971; 1975; 1979; 1983; 1987; 1991; 1995; 1999; 2003; 2007; 2011; 2015; 2019; 2023

Nicaragua competed at the 2019 Pan American Games in Lima, Peru from July 26 to August 11, 2019.

In June 2019, the Nicaraguan Olympic Committee named a team of 60 athletes (41 men and 19 women) competing in 13 sports.

During the opening ceremony of the games, beach volleyball athlete Swan Mendoza carried the flag of the country as part of the parade of nations.

== Competitors ==
The following is the list of number of competitors (per gender) participating at the games per sport/discipline.

Sport	Men	Women	Total
Athletics (track and field)	0	1	1
Baseball	24	0	24
Bodybuilding	1	1	2
Boxing	4	5	9
Judo	0	1	1
Karate	3	0	3
Rowing	2	2	4
Taekwondo	1	1	2
Shooting	2	1	3
Swimming	2	2	4
Volleyball	2	2	4
Weightlifting	0	2	2
Wrestling	0	1	1
Total	41	19	60

== Medalists ==
The following competitors from Nicaragua won medals at the games. In the by discipline sections below, medalists' names are bolded.

Medal	Name	Sport	Event	Date
Bronze	Kevin Arias	Boxing	Men's 49 kg	July 30
Bronze	Lesther Espino	Boxing	Men's 75 kg	July 30
Bronze	Benjamín Alegría; Luis Alen; Isaac Benard; Jimmy Bermúdez; Dwight Britton; Jorge Bucardo; Wilber Bucardo; Jilton Calderón; Darrel Campbell; Ofilio Castro; Berman Espinoza; Rafael Estrada; Fidencio Flores; Jesús Garrido; Ernesto Glasgon; Elías Gutiérrez; Wilton López; Gustavo Martínez; Marvin Martínez; Edgard Montiel; Javier Robles; Junior Téllez; Norlando Valle; Wuillians Vasquez	Baseball	Men's tournament	August 4

**Medals by sport**
**Sport**	1st place, gold medalist(s)	2nd place, silver medalist(s)	3rd place, bronze medalist(s)	**Total**
Boxing	0	0	2	2
Baseball	0	0	1	1
**Total**	**0**	**0**	**3**	**3**

== Athletics (track and field) ==
Nicaragua entered one female athlete. Originally two athletes were named to the team.

Key

- Note–Ranks given for track events are for the entire round

Women
Field event

Athlete	Event	Final	
Athlete	Event	Distance	Position
Dalila Rugama	Javelin throw	47.66	14

== Baseball ==
Nicaragua qualified a men's team of 24 athletes by finishing in the top four at the 2019 Pan American Games Qualifier in Brazil.

Roster

Player	Pos.	DOB and age	Team	League	Birthplace
Jimmy Bermúdez	P	June 21, 1981 (aged 38)	(Nicaragua) Leones de León	Nicaraguan Baseball League	Ticuantepe, Nicaragua
Wilber Bucardo	P	November 20, 1987 (aged 31)	(Nicaragua) Tigres del Chinandega	Nicaraguan Baseball League	León, Nicaragua
Berman Espinoza	P	November 4, 1987 (aged 31)	(Nicaragua) Indios del Bóer	Nicaraguan Baseball League	Matagalpa, Nicaragua
Fidencio Flores	P	September 10, 1991 (aged 27)	(Nicaragua) Indios del Bóer	Nicaraguan Baseball League	El Sauce, Nicaragua
Elvin García	P	May 14, 1990 (aged 29)	(Nicaragua) Indios del Bóer	Nicaraguan Baseball League	Estelí, Nicaragua
Jesús Garrido	P	May 10, 1995 (aged 24)	(Nicaragua) Leones de León	Nicaraguan Baseball League	Chinandega, Nicaragua
Ernesto Glasgon	P	September 14, 1991 (aged 27)	(Nicaragua) Indios del Bóer	Nicaraguan Baseball League	Caribe Sur, Nicaragua
Elías Gutiérrez	P	December 11, 1994 (aged 24)	(Nicaragua) Leones de León	Nicaraguan Baseball League	Jinotega, Nicaragua
Wilton López	P	July 19, 1983 (aged 36)			León, Nicaragua
Gustavo Martínez	P	November 9, 1975 (aged 43)	(Nicaragua) Gigantes de Rivas	Nicaraguan Baseball League	Santo Domingo, Dominican Republic
Junior Téllez	P	July 1, 1990 (aged 29)	(Nicaragua) Tigres del Chinandega	Nicaraguan Baseball League	León, Nicaragua
Luis Alen	C	April 16, 1985 (aged 34)	(Nicaragua) Leones de León	Nicaraguan Baseball League	Ciudad Bolívar, Venezuela
Rafael Estrada	C	March 5, 1993 (aged 26)	(Nicaragua) Leones de León	Nicaraguan Baseball League	Jinotega, Nicaragua
Benjamín Alegría	IF	August 6, 1997 (aged 21)	(Nicaragua) Leones de León	Nicaraguan Baseball League	Managua, Nicaragua
Darrel Campbell	IF	December 29, 1981 (aged 37)	(Nicaragua) Gigantes de Rivas	Nicaraguan Baseball League	Bluefields, Nicaragua
Ofilio Castro	IF	August 18, 1983 (aged 35)	(Nicaragua) Leones de León	Nicaraguan Baseball League	Managua, Nicaragua
Marvin Martínez	IF	April 20, 1991 (aged 28)	(Nicaragua) Tigres del Chinandega	Nicaraguan Baseball League	León, Nicaragua
Edgard Montiel	IF	January 13, 1988 (aged 31)	(Nicaragua) Tigres del Chinandega	Nicaraguan Baseball League	Managua, Nicaragua
Wuillians Vasquez	IF	July 23, 1983 (aged 36)	(Nicaragua) Leones de León	Nicaraguan Baseball League	Acarigua, Venezuela
Isaac Benard	OF	January 2, 1996 (aged 23)	(United States) Florence Freedom	Frontier League	West Richland, Washington, United States
Dwight Britton	OF	July 17, 1987 (aged 32)	(Nicaragua) Leones de León	Nicaraguan Baseball League	Corn Islands, Nicaragua
Jilton Calderón	OF	September 16, 1988 (aged 30)	(Nicaragua) Indios del Bóer	Nicaraguan Baseball League	Jinotepe, Nicaragua
Javier Robles	OF	August 10, 1994 (aged 24)	(Nicaragua) Indios del Bóer	Nicaraguan Baseball League	Masaya, Nicaragua
Norlando Valle	OF	August 2, 1994 (aged 24)	(Nicaragua) Tigres del Chinandega	Nicaraguan Baseball League	León, Nicaragua

Group A

	GP	W	L	RS	RA	DIFF
Puerto Rico	3	3	0	13	5	+8
Nicaragua	3	2	1	17	9	+8
Dominican Republic	3	1	2	13	9	+4
Peru	3	0	3	4	24	−14

Qualified for the Super round

July 30; 10:05	**Puerto Rico**	**7–3**	Nicaragua	Baseball Stadium, Lima; Attendance: 1,059
July 30; 10:05		Boxscore		Baseball Stadium, Lima; Attendance: 1,059

July 31; 10:05	**Nicaragua**	**4–2**	Dominican Republic	Baseball Stadium, Lima; Attendance: 577
July 31; 10:05		Boxscore		Baseball Stadium, Lima; Attendance: 577

August 1; 19:05	Peru	**0–10 (F/7)**	**Nicaragua**	Baseball Stadium, Lima; Attendance: 1,994
August 1; 19:05		Boxscore		Baseball Stadium, Lima; Attendance: 1,994

Super round

	GP	W	L	RS	RA	DIFF
Puerto Rico	3	3	0	17	9	+8
Canada	3	2	1	25	11	+14
Colombia	3	1	2	15	13	+2
Nicaragua	3	0	3	4	28	−24

August 2; 19:05	Nicaragua	**1–11 (F/7)**	**Colombia**	Baseball Stadium, Lima; Attendance: 1,513
August 2; 19:05		Boxscore		Baseball Stadium, Lima; Attendance: 1,513

August 3; 15:05	Nicaragua	**0–10 (F/7)**	**Canada**	Baseball Stadium, Lima; Attendance: 1,979
August 3; 15:05		Boxscore		Baseball Stadium, Lima; Attendance: 1,979

Bronze medal match

August 4; 11:05	Colombia	**0–6**	**Nicaragua** (bronze)	Baseball Stadium, Lima; Attendance: N/A
August 4; 11:05		Boxscore		Baseball Stadium, Lima; Attendance: N/A

== Bodybuilding ==
Nicaragua qualified a full team of two bodybuilders (one male and one female).

Athlete	Event	Prejudging		Final	
Athlete	Event	Points	Rank	Points	Rank
Jorge Callejas	Men's classic bodybuilding	—N/a		79	6
Grace Callejas	Women's bikini fitness	—N/a		Did not advance	

- No results were provided for the prejudging round, with only the top six advancing.

== Boxing ==
Nicaragua qualified nine boxers (four men and five women).

Men

Athlete	Event	Quarterfinals	Semifinals	Final	Rank
Athlete	Event	Opposition Result	Opposition Result	Opposition Result	Rank
**Kevin Arias**	49 kg	Bezerra (BRA); **W** 3–2	Martínez (COL); **L** 0–5	Did not advance	3rd place, bronze medalist(s)
Jimmy Brenes	69 kg	Iglesias (CUB); **L** 0–5	Did not advance		
**Lesther Espino**	75 kg	Prince (TRI); **W** RSC	López (CUB); **L** 0–5	Did not advance	3rd place, bronze medalist(s)
Darwin Rodríguez	+91 kg	Brown (JAM); **L** 2–3	Did not advance		

Women

Athlete	Event	Quarterfinals	Semifinals	Final	Rank
Athlete	Event	Opposition Result	Opposition Result	Opposition Result	Rank
Katy Esquivel	51 kg	Hernández (DOM); **L** 1–4	Did not advance		
Keyling Reyes	57 kg	Romeu (BRA); **L** RSC	Did not advance		
Scarleth Ojeda	60 kg	Falcon (MEX); **L** 0–5	Did not advance		
Keyling Osejo	69 kg	Cruz (MEX); **L** 0–5	Did not advance		
Fredly Ramírez	75 kg	Figueiredo (BRA); **L** 0–5	Did not advance		

== Judo ==
Nicaragua qualified one female judoka.

Women

Athlete	Event	Round of 16	Quarterfinals	Semifinals	Repechage	Final / BM	
Athlete	Event	Opposition Result	Opposition Result	Opposition Result	Opposition Result	Opposition Result	Rank
Izayana Marenco	+78 kg	Bye	Cutro-Kelly (USA); **L** 00S3–100S1	Did not advance	Wood (TRI); **W** 100–000	Souza (BRA); **L** 00S2–100	=5

== Karate ==
Nicaragua qualified three male karatekas. The team of three athletes was disqualified in the bronze medal match versus Brazil for going over the time limit.

Kata
Men

Athlete	Event	Round Robin		Final / BM	
Athlete	Event	Points	Rank	Opposition Result	Rank
Alejandro Hernandez; Daniel Lira; Franklin Sanchez	Team kata	21.40	3 **QB**	Brazil; **L** 0–24.42	=5

== Rowing ==
Nicaragua qualified two female rowers. Later two male quotas were redistributed to the country.

Athlete	Event	Heats		Repechage		Final	
Athlete	Event	Time	Rank	Time	Rank	Time	Rank
Felix Potoy; Eddy Vanega	Men's double sculls	7:00.61	6 **R**	6:48.75	4 **FB**	7:08.66	10
Evidelia González; Ana Vanegas	Women's pair	7:54.47	5 **FA**	—N/a		8:07.30	5

Qualification Legend: FA=Final A; FB=Final B; R=Repechage
- Results given are within the heat.

== Shooting ==
Nicaragua received three reallocated sports in shooting (two men and one woman).

Athlete	Event	Qualification		Final	
Athlete	Event	Points	Rank	Points	Rank
Angel Barquero	Men's 10 m air pistol	552	29	Did not advance	
Rafael Lacayo	Men's 10 m air pistol	556	28	Did not advance	
Maria Lopez	Women's 10 m air rifle	579.4	24	Did not advance	
Maria Lopez	50 m rifle three positions	1129	17	Did not advance	

== Swimming ==
Nicaragua qualified four swimmers (two men and two women).

Key

- Note – Ranks given are for the entire round

Athlete	Event	Heat		Final	
Athlete	Event	Time	Rank	Time	Rank
Miguel Mena	Men's 50 m freestyle	24.00	26	Did not advance	
Miguel Mena	Men's 100 m freestyle	52.07	19	Did not advance	
Miguel Mena	Men's 200 m freestyle	1:57.67	20	Did not advance	
Eisner Barbarena	Men's 100 m backstroke	1:00.52	23	Did not advance	
Eisner Barbarena	Men's 200 m backstroke	2:15.83	23	Did not advance	
María Hernández	Women's 50 m freestyle	27.74	25	Did not advance	
María Hernández	Women's 200 m freestyle	2:17.25	23	Did not advance	
María Hernández	Women's 100 m backstroke	1:11.75	24	Did not advance	
Maria Schutzmeier	Women's 100 m freestyle	59.32	20	Did not advance	
Maria Schutzmeier	Women's 100 m butterfly	1:03.99	18	Did not advance	

== Taekwondo ==
Nicaragua qualified one male and one female taekwondo practitioner.

Kyorugi

Athlete	Event	Round of 16	Quarterfinals	Semifinals	Repechage	Final / BM	Rank
Athlete	Event	Opposition Result	Opposition Result	Opposition Result	Opposition Result	Opposition Result	Rank
Jerry Mansell	Men's 58 kg	Oblitas (PER); **L** 8–19	Did not advance				
Solansh Vargas	Women's 49 kg	Canseco (PER); **L** 8–11	Did not advance				

== Volleyball ==
=== Beach ===
Nicaragua qualified four beach volleyball athletes (two men and two women).

Athletes	Event	Preliminary Round				Qualifying round	Placement round	Placement match	Rank
Athletes	Event	Opposition Score	Opposition Score	Opposition Score	Rank	Opposition Score	Opposition Score	Opposition Score	Rank
Rubén Mora; Danny López	Men's	Nusbaum / Plantinga (CAN); **L** 0–2 (20–22, 28–30)	M. Grimalt / E. Grimalt (CHI); **L** 1–2 (19–21, 21–19, 13–15)	Ontiveros/ Virgen (MEX); **L** 0–2 (16–21, 17–21)	4	Did not qualify	Vásquez / Seminario (PER); **W** 2–0 (21–7, 21–15)	Alpízar / Valenciano (CRC); **W** 2–0 (21–16, 21–14)	13
Swan Mendoza; Lolette Rodriguez	Women's	Harnett / Lapointe (CAN); **L** 1–2 (17–21, 21–14, 9–15)	Gallay / Pereyra (ARG); **L** 0–2 (12–21, 11–21)	Alvarado / Bethancourt (GUA); **W** 2–0 (21–15, 21–18)	3 **Q**	Araya / Valenciano (CRC); **L** 0–2 (14–21, 16–21)	Allcca / Mendoza (PER); **L** 1–2 (21–18, 22–24, 11–15)	Orellana / Revuelta (MEX); **L** 0–2 (16–21, 18–21)	12

== Weightlifting ==
Nicaragua qualified two female weightlifters.

Women

Athlete	Event	Snatch		Clean & jerk		Total	Rank
Athlete	Event	Result	Rank	Result	Rank	Total	Rank
María Navarro	49 kg	60	11	83	9	143	9
Sema Ludrick	64 kg	89	5	112	5	222	5

== Wrestling ==
Nicaragua received one wild card in the women's freestyle discipline.

Freestyle
Women

Athlete	Event	Qualification	Quarterfinals	Semifinals	Repechage	Final / BM	Rank
Athlete	Event	Opposition Result	Opposition Result	Opposition Result	Opposition Result	Opposition Result	Rank
Paula Ramírez	57 kg	Bye	Burkert (USA); **L** 0–10	Did not advance	—N/a	Penalber (BRA); **L** 2–2^{F}	=5
