= Nicaragua at the 2015 Pan American Games =

- IOC code: NIC
- NOC: Comité Olímpico Nicaragüense
- Website: www.ind.gob.ni/comiteolimpico.php

in Toronto, Canada 10–26 July 2015
- Competitors: 49 in 11 sports
- Flag bearer (opening): Darrel Campbell Lewis
- Flag bearer (closing): Dalila Rugama
- Medals: Gold 0 Silver 0 Bronze 0 Total 0

Pan American Games appearances (overview)
- 1951; 1955; 1959; 1963; 1967; 1971; 1975; 1979; 1983; 1987; 1991; 1995; 1999; 2003; 2007; 2011; 2015; 2019; 2023; 2027

Nicaragua competed in the 2015 Pan American Games in Toronto, Canada from July 10-26, 2015.

Baseball player Darrel Campbell Lewis was the flagbearer for the team during the opening ceremony.

== Competitors ==
The following table lists Nicaragua's delegation per sport and gender.

Sport	Men	Women	Total
Athletics	1	1	2
Baseball	24	0	24
Beach volleyball	2	2	4
Boxing	3	1	4
Rowing	0	2	2
Shooting	3	0	3
Swimming	1	1	2
Taekwondo	2	0	2
Triathlon	1	0	1
Weightlifting	1	1	2
Wrestling	2	1	3
Total	40	9	49

== Athletics ==
Nicaragua entered two track and field athletes (one male and one female).

Key

- Note – Ranks given for track events are for the entire round
- NM – No mark

Track

Athlete	Event	Final	
Athlete	Event	Result	Rank
Erick Rodríguez	Men's 3000 m steeplechase	9:25.90	11

Field

Athlete	Event	Final	
Athlete	Event	Distance	Position
Dalila Rugama	Women's javelin throw	NM	

== Baseball ==
Nicaragua qualified a men's baseball team of 24 athletes.

Men's tournament

Roster

The following is Nicaragua's men's baseball team for the 2015 Pan American Games. The position of the player is listed in parentheses.

- Dwight Britton (OF)
- Jorge Bucardo (P)
- Ofilio Castro (INF)
- Wiston Davila (C)
- Berman Espinoza (P)
- Samuel Estrada (P)
- Ramon Flores (OF)
- Elvin Garcia (P)
- Ronald Garth (INF)
- Sandor Guido (INF)
- Gerardo Juarez (P)
- Darrel Leiva (P)
- Darrel Campbell Lewis (INF)
- Ivan Marin (INF)
- Gustavo Martinez (P)
- Janior Montes (C)
- Renato Morales (OF)
- Vicente Padilla (P)
- Justo Rivas (OF)
- Arnold Rizo (OF)
- Jose Saenz (P)
- Douglas Solis (P)
- Carlos Teller (P)
- Junior Tellez (P)

Legend: C = Catcher, INF = Infielder, OF = Outfielder, P = Pitcher

Group A

Pos	Team	Pld	W	L	RF	RA	RD	PCT	GB	Qualification
1	Canada	6	5	1	38	15	+23	.833	—	Advance to the semifinals
2	United States	6	4	2	33	22	+11	.667 (Note: In the 3-way tie for 2nd place, all three teams went 1-1 head to head. The 2nd tiebreaker, Team Quality Balance, was used to identify and eliminate the last team in the group (Puerto Rico). The tie between the other two teams was then broken on the basis of the head-to-head result between them (United States defeating Cuba).)	1	Advance to the semifinals
3	Cuba	6	4	2	41	23	+18	.667	1	Advance to the semifinals
4	Puerto Rico	6	4	2	40	44	−4	.667	1	Advance to the semifinals
5	Dominican Republic	6	3	3	30	35	−5	.500	2	
6	Nicaragua	6	1	5	22	43	−21	.167	4	
7	Colombia	6	0	6	22	44	−22	.000	5	

Notes:

12 July 2015; 12:00	Dominican Republic	8–5	Nicaragua	President’s Choice Ajax Pan Am Ballpark – Main Field, Ajax; Attendance: 3,418
12 July 2015; 12:00		Boxscore		President’s Choice Ajax Pan Am Ballpark – Main Field, Ajax; Attendance: 3,418

13 July 2015; 19:00	Nicaragua	1–9	Canada	President’s Choice Ajax Pan Am Ballpark – Main Field, Ajax; Attendance: 4,327
13 July 2015; 19:00		Boxscore		President’s Choice Ajax Pan Am Ballpark – Main Field, Ajax; Attendance: 4,327

14 July 2015; 12:00	Colombia	4–7	Nicaragua	President’s Choice Ajax Pan Am Ballpark – Main Field, Ajax; Attendance: 1,357
14 July 2015; 12:00		Boxscore		President’s Choice Ajax Pan Am Ballpark – Main Field, Ajax; Attendance: 1,357

15 July 2015; 12:00	Nicaragua	0–6	United States	President’s Choice Ajax Pan Am Ballpark – Main Field, Ajax; Attendance: 1,038
15 July 2015; 12:00		Boxscore		President’s Choice Ajax Pan Am Ballpark – Main Field, Ajax; Attendance: 1,038

16 July 2015; 15:30	Nicaragua	6–11	Cuba	President’s Choice Ajax Pan Am Ballpark – Second Field, Ajax; Attendance: 1,027
16 July 2015; 15:30		Boxscore		President’s Choice Ajax Pan Am Ballpark – Second Field, Ajax; Attendance: 1,027

17 July 2015; 12:00	Puerto Rico	5–3	Nicaragua	President’s Choice Ajax Pan Am Ballpark – Main Field, Ajax; Attendance: 724
17 July 2015; 12:00		Boxscore		President’s Choice Ajax Pan Am Ballpark – Main Field, Ajax; Attendance: 724

== Beach volleyball ==
Nicaragua qualified a men's and women's pair.

Athlete	Event	Preliminary Round			Elimination Round	9-12th place round	11th place match	Finals
Athlete	Event	Opposition Score	Opposition Score	Opposition Score	Opposition Score	Opposition Score	Opposition Score	Rank
Mora Romero; Lopez Alvarado	Men's	Binstock / Schachter (CAN); L 14–21, 21–16, 10–15	Cairus / Vieyto (URU); L 14–21, 14–21	Betancourt / Ocaña (GUA); W 21–17, 17–21, 15–7	Capogrosso / Mehamed (ARG); L 15–21, 15–21	Williams / Withfield (TRI); L 21–23, 21–17, 13–15	Evans / Satterfield (USA); 16–21, 28–30	12

Athlete	Event	Preliminary Round			13th to 16th Round	15th to 16th Round	Finals
Athlete	Event	Opposition Score	Opposition Score	Opposition Score	Opposition Score	Opposition Score	Rank
Elia Machado; Lolette Rodríguez	Women's	Maestrini / Horta (BRA); L 7–21, 13–21	Alfaro / Cope (CRC); L 15–21, 9–21	Mardones / Rivas (CHI); L 13–21, 21–14, 10–15	Orellana / Recinos (GUA); L 12–21, 23–21, 8–15	Powery / Smith-Johnson (CAY); W 21–7, 21–16	15

== Boxing ==
Nicaragua qualified four boxers (three men and one woman).

Athlete	Event	Preliminaries	Quarterfinals	Semifinals	Final	Rank
Athlete	Event	Opposition Result	Opposition Result	Opposition Result	Opposition Result	Rank
Kevin Arias	Men's light flyweight	Bye	Argilagos (CUB); L 0–2	did not advance		5
Franco Gutiérrez	Men's bantamweight	Bye	García (DOM); L 0–3	did not advance		5
Lester Silva	Men's welterweight	Bye	Solano (DOM); L 0–3	did not advance		5
Claudia Parrales Guevara	Women's flyweight	—N/a	Esparza (USA); L 0–3	did not advance		5

== Rowing ==
Nicaragua qualified 1 boat and two athletes.

Women

Athlete	Event	Heats		Final	
Athlete	Event	Time	Rank	Time	Rank
Ana Jarguin; Evidelia Jarquin	Coxless Pair	8:00.59	6 FA	8:12.45	6

Qualification Legend: FA=Final A (medal); FB=Final B (non-medal); R=Repechage

== Shooting ==
Nicaragua has qualified 3 male shooters.

Men

Athlete	Event	Qualification		Final	
Athlete	Event	Points	Rank	Points	Rank
Manuel Aburto Espinales	10 metre air pistol	547-07x	31	did not advance	
Yerald Canda	50 metre rifle prone	564.1	29	did not advance	
Yerald Canda	10 metre air rifle	543.4	22	did not advance	
Rafael Lacayo Paladino	10 metre air pistol	566-15x	12	did not advance	

== Swimming ==
Nicaragua received two wildcards to enter one male and one female swimmer.

Key

- Note – Ranks given are for the entire round
- FB = Qualified for the B Final

Athlete	Event	Heat		Final	
Athlete	Event	Time	Rank	Time	Rank
Miguel Mena	Men's 50 m freestyle	23.71	17	did not advance	
Miguel Mena	Men's 100 m freestyle	52.55	17 FB	52.59	=15
Miguel Mena	Men's 200 m freestyle	1:58.51	20	did not advance	
Dalia Tórrez Zamora	Women's 50 m freestyle	27.80	22	did not advance	
Dalia Tórrez Zamora	Women's 100 m freestyle	1:01.48	25	did not advance	
Dalia Tórrez Zamora	Women's 200 m butterfly	1:04.79	19	did not advance	

== Taekwondo ==
Nicaragua qualified a team of one male athlete, and also received an additional wildcard to enter another male athlete.

Men

Athlete	Event	Round of 16	Quarterfinals	Semifinals	Repechage	Bronze Medal	Final	
Athlete	Event	Opposition Result	Opposition Result	Opposition Result	Opposition Result	Opposition Result	Opposition Result	Rank
Danilo Castillo	58 kg	Logan Gerrick (USA); L 3–4	did not advance					
Michael Rodriguez	80 kg	Agustin Alves (ARG); L 2–11	did not advance					

== Triathlon ==
Nicaragua received a wildcard to enter one male triathlete.

Men

Athlete	Event	Swim (1.5 km)	Trans 1	Bike (40 km)	Trans 2	Run (10 km)	Total	Rank
Hennert Mayorga	Individual	22:06	0:27	LAP				

== Weightlifting ==
Nicaragua qualified one male and one female weightlifter.

Athlete	Event	Snatch		Clean & Jerk		Total	Rank
Athlete	Event	Result	Rank	Result	Rank	Total	Rank
Orlando Vasquez Morales	Men's 56 kg	100	6	123	6	223	6
Silvia Artola	Women's 63 kg	81	6	105	6	186	6

== Wrestling ==
Nicaragua received two reallocated spots (one each in men's freestyle and Greco-Roman) and one wildcard in women's freestyle. However, Elverine Jimenez was disqualified from the games for doping. Jimenez did not compete in the event, and her opponent in the first round won by default.

Athlete	Event	Preliminaries	Quarterfinals	Semifinals	Repechage	Final / BM
Athlete	Event	Opposition Result	Opposition Result	Opposition Result	Opposition Result	Opposition Result
Alberto Mendieta	Men's Freestyle 65 kg	Luis Portillo (ESA); L 0–10	Did not advance			
Rene Silva	Men's Freestyle 125 kg	—N/a	Zach Rey (USA); L 0–4	Did not advance	Andres Ramos (CUB); L 0–10	Did not advance
Elverine Jimenez	Women's Freestyle 53 kg	—N/a	Whitney Conder (USA); L DQ	Did not advance		

== See also ==
- Nicaragua at the 2016 Summer Olympics
