= Omar Núñez =

Nicaraguan swimmer

Sport
- Sport: Swimming
- Strokes: Freestyle, open water swimming

Omar Yasser Núñez Munguía is an Olympic swimmer from Nicaragua. He swam for Nicaragua at the:

- Olympics: 2008, 2012
- World Championships: 2001, 2003, 2005, 2007, 2009, 2011
- Pan American Games: 2003, 2007, 2011
- Central American and Caribbean Games: 2002, 2006
- Short Course Worlds: 2008, 2010
- Central American Sports Games: 1997, 2001, 2006 (Silver and bronze medals),2010
