= Nicaragua at the 2012 Summer Olympics =

- IOC code: NCA
- NOC: Nicaraguan Olympic Committee

in London
- Competitors: 6 in 4 sports
- Flag bearer: Osmar Bravo
- Medals: Gold 0 Silver 0 Bronze 0 Total 0

Summer Olympics appearances (overview)
- 1968; 1972; 1976; 1980; 1984; 1988; 1992; 1996; 2000; 2004; 2008; 2012; 2016; 2020; 2024

Nicaragua competed at the 2012 Summer Olympics in London, United Kingdom, held from 27 July to 12 August 2012. This was the nation's 12th appearance at the Olympics.

The Nicaraguan Olympic Committee sent a total of six athletes to the Games, an equal share between men and women, to compete in four different sports, tying its record for the number of athletes at a single Olympics with the 2008 Summer Olympics in Beijing, China.

== Background ==
Nicaragua made their Olympic debut at the 1968 Summer Olympics in Mexico City, Mexico and they had appeared at every Summer Olympics since. The 2012 Summer Olympics in London, England, United Kingdom marked Nicaragua's 12th appearance at a Summer Olympics and the six athletes present was their joint-largest delegation ever, equal with the 2008 Summer Olympics in Beijing, China.

== Competitors ==
In total, six athletes represented Nicaragua at the 2012 Summer Olympics in London, England, United Kingdom across four different sports.

Sport	Men	Women	Total
Athletics	1	1	2
Boxing	1	0	1
Swimming	1	1	2
Weightlifting	0	1	1
Total	3	3	6

== Athletics ==
In total, two Nicaraguan athletes participated in the athletics events – Edgar Cortez in the men's 800 m and Ingrid Yahoska Narvaez |align=left|women's 400 m.

Men

Athlete	Event	Heat		Semifinal		Final	
Athlete	Event	Result	Rank	Result	Rank	Result	Rank
Edgar Cortez	800 m	1:58.99	7	did not advance			

Women

Athlete	Event	Heat		Semifinal		Final	
Athlete	Event	Result	Rank	Result	Rank	Result	Rank
Ingrid Yahoska Narvaez	400 m	59.55	6	did not advance			

== Boxing ==
In total, one Nicaraguan athlete participated in the boxing events – Osmar Bravo in the men's light heavyweight category.

Athlete	Event	Round of 32	Round of 16	Quarterfinals	Semifinals	Final	
Athlete	Event	Opposition Result	Opposition Result	Opposition Result	Opposition Result	Opposition Result	Rank
Osmar Bravo	Light heavyweight	Drašković (MNE); W 16–11	Hvozdyk (UKR); L 6–18	did not advance			

== Swimming ==
In total, two Nicaraguan athletes participated in the swimming events – Omar Núñez in the men's 100 m freestyle and Dalia Torrez Zamora in the women's 100 m butterfly.

Men

Athlete	Event	Heat		Semifinal		Final	
Athlete	Event	Time	Rank	Time	Rank	Time	Rank
Omar Núñez	100 m freestyle	57.11	51	did not advance			

Women

Athlete	Event	Heat		Semifinal		Final	
Athlete	Event	Time	Rank	Time	Rank	Time	Rank
Dalia Torrez Zamora	100 m butterfly	1:05.32	39	did not advance			

== Weightlifting ==
In total, one Nicaraguan athlete participated in the weightlifting events – Lucia Castañeda in the women's −63 kg category.

Athlete	Event	Snatch		Clean & Jerk		Total	Rank
Athlete	Event	Result	Rank	Result	Rank	Total	Rank
Lucia Castañeda	Women's −63 kg	79	9	97	10	176	9
