= List of Nicaraguan records in Olympic weightlifting =

The following are the records of Nicaragua in Olympic weightlifting. Records are maintained in each weight class for the snatch lift, clean and jerk lift, and the total for both lifts by the Federacion Nicaraguense de Levantamiento de Pesas.

== Current records ==
=== Men ===
Event	Record	Athlete	Date	Meet	Place	Ref
60 kg
Snatch	kg					
Clean & Jerk	kg					
Total	kg					
65 kg
Snatch	126 kg	Orlando Vásquez	5 August 2026	CAC Games	Santo Domingo, Dominican Republic	
Clean & Jerk	156 kg	Orlando Vásquez	5 August 2026	CAC Games	Santo Domingo, Dominican Republic	
Total	282 kg	Orlando Vásquez	5 August 2026	CAC Games	Santo Domingo, Dominican Republic	
71 kg
Snatch	kg					
Clean & Jerk	kg					
Total	kg					
79 kg
Snatch	kg					
Clean & Jerk	kg					
Total	kg					
88 kg
Snatch	161 kg	Norwin Washington	7 August 2026	CAC Games	Santo Domingo, Dominican Republic	
Clean & Jerk	kg					
Total	kg					
94 kg
Snatch	kg					
Clean & Jerk	kg					
Total	kg					
110 kg
Snatch	kg					
Clean & Jerk	kg					
Total	kg					
+110 kg
Snatch	kg					
Clean & Jerk	kg					
Total	kg					

== Historical records ==
=== Men (2018-2025) ===
Event	Record	Athlete	Date	Meet	Place	Ref
55 kg
Snatch						
Clean & Jerk						
Total						
61 kg
Snatch	116 kg	Orlando Vasquez	23 April 2019	Pan American Championships	Guatemala City, Guatemala	
Clean & Jerk	132 kg	Mith Lacayo	24 June 2023	CAC Games	San Salvador, El Salvador	
Total	237 kg	Mith Lacayo	24 June 2023	CAC Games	San Salvador, El Salvador	
67 kg
Snatch	131 kg	Orlando Vasquez	24 June 2023	CAC Games	San Salvador, El Salvador	
Clean & Jerk	159 kg	Orlando Vasquez	19 April 2023	Central American & Caribbean Championships	Santo Domingo, Dominican Republic	
Total	286 kg	Orlando Vasquez	19 April 2023	Central American & Caribbean Championships	Santo Domingo, Dominican Republic	
73 kg
Snatch	131 kg	Orlando Vasquez	10 June 2023	IWF Grand Prix	Havana, Cuba	
Clean & Jerk	167 kg	Armando Britton	25 June 2023	CAC Games	San Salvador, El Salvador	
Total	298 kg	Armando Britton	25 June 2023	CAC Games	San Salvador, El Salvador	
81 kg
Snatch						
Clean & Jerk						
Total						
89 kg
Snatch						
Clean & Jerk						
Total						
96 kg
Snatch	140 kg	Norwin Washington	26 June 2023	CAC Games	San Salvador, El Salvador	
Clean & Jerk	167 kg	Norwin Washington	27 February 2024	Pan American Championships	Caracas, Venezuela	
Total	307 kg	Norwin Washington	27 February 2024	Pan American Championships	Caracas, Venezuela	
102 kg
Snatch						
Clean & Jerk						
Total						
109 kg
Snatch						
Clean & Jerk						
Total						
+109 kg
Snatch						
Clean & Jerk						
Total						

=== Women (2018-2025) ===
Event	Record	Athlete	Date	Meet	Place	Ref
45 kg
Snatch	64 kg	Maria Navarro	19 April 2021	Pan American Championships	Santo Domingo, Dominican Republic	
Clean & Jerk	82 kg	Maria Navarro	19 April 2021	Pan American Championships	Santo Domingo, Dominican Republic	
Total	146 kg	Maria Navarro	19 April 2021	Pan American Championships	Santo Domingo, Dominican Republic	
49 kg
Snatch	66 kg	Jessica González	20 April 2021	Pan American Championships	Santo Domingo, Dominican Republic	
Clean & Jerk	85 kg	Jessica González	20 April 2021	Pan American Championships	Santo Domingo, Dominican Republic	
Total	151 kg	Jessica González	20 April 2021	Pan American Championships	Santo Domingo, Dominican Republic	
55 kg
Snatch						
Clean & Jerk						
Total						
59 kg
Snatch	80 kg	Mariana Olivas	10 June 2023	IWF Grand Prix	Havana, Cuba	
Clean & Jerk	100 kg	Javiana Pavon	10 June 2023	IWF Grand Prix	Havana, Cuba	
Total	180 kg	Javiana Pavon	10 June 2023	IWF Grand Prix	Havana, Cuba	
64 kg
Snatch	89 kg	Sema Ludrick	29 July 2019	Pan American Games	Lima, Peru	
Clean & Jerk	116 kg	Sema Ludrick	21 April 2021	Pan American Championships	Santo Domingo, Dominican Republic	
Total	202 kg	Sema Ludrick	27 July 2021	Olympic Games	Tokyo, Japan	
71 kg
Snatch	86 kg	Lucía Castañeda	26 June 2023	CAC Games	San Salvador, El Salvador	
Clean & Jerk	116 kg	Sema Ludrick	26 February 2024	Pan American Championships	Caracas, Venezuela	
Total	202 kg	Sema Ludrick	26 February 2024	Pan American Championships	Caracas, Venezuela	
76 kg
Snatch	81 kg	Caratiny Stivenson	April 2019	Pan American Championships	Guatemala City, Guatemala	
Clean & Jerk	101 kg	Caratiny Stivenson	April 2019	Pan American Championships	Guatemala City, Guatemala	
Total	182 kg	Caratiny Stivenson	April 2019	Pan American Championships	Guatemala City, Guatemala	
81 kg
Snatch						
Clean & Jerk						
Total						
87 kg
Snatch						
Clean & Jerk						
Total						
+87 kg
Snatch						
Clean & Jerk						
Total						
