= Nicaragua at the 2011 Pan American Games =

- IOC code: NIC
- NOC: Comité Olímpico Nicaragüense
- Website: www.ind.gob.ni/comiteolimpico.php

in Guadalajara 14–30 October 2011
- Competitors: 31 in 11 sports
- Flag bearer: Dalia Tórrez Zamora
- Medals: Gold 0 Silver 0 Bronze 0 Total 0

Pan American Games appearances (overview)
- 1951; 1955; 1959; 1963; 1967; 1971; 1975; 1979; 1983; 1987; 1991; 1995; 1999; 2003; 2007; 2011; 2015; 2019; 2023

Nicaragua competed at the 2011 Pan American Games in Guadalajara, Mexico from October 14 to 30, 2011. Nicaragua's contingent was made up of 50 people including 31 athletes competing in 11 different sports. The Chef de mission of the team was Eduardo Abdullah.

== Athletics ==
=== Men ===
Track and road events

| Event | Athletes | Heats | | Semifinal | | Final | |
| Event | Athletes | Time | Rank | Time | Rank | Time | Rank |
|---|---|---|---|---|---|---|---|
| 800 m | Edgard Alejandro Cortez | | | 1:59.02 | 7th | Did not advance | |
| Marathon | Simas Alberto Castro | | | | | 2:47:25 | 17th |

=== Women ===
Track and road events

| Event | Athletes | Semifinal | | Final | |
| Event | Athletes | Time | Rank | Time | Rank |
|---|---|---|---|---|---|
| 400 m hurdles | Jessica Aguilera | 1:03.75 | 7th | Did not advance | |

Field events

| Event | Athletes | Semifinal | | Final | |
| Event | Athletes | Result | Rank | Result | Rank |
|---|---|---|---|---|---|
| Javelin throw | Dalila Rugama | | | 46.82 m. | 14th |

== Basque pelota ==
Nicaragua qualified two athletes in the paleta rubber pairs 30m fronton category.

=== Men ===
| Athlete(s) | Event | Series 1 | Series 2 | Series 3 | Series 4 | Bronze medal | Final |
| Athlete(s) | Event | Opposition Score | Opposition Score | Opposition Score | Opposition Score | Opposition Score | Opposition Score |
|---|---|---|---|---|---|---|---|
| Oscar Bustillo; Victor Bustillo | Paleta Rubber Pairs 30m Fronton | Fernando Celaya (CHI) & Pedro De Orte; L 0-2 | Enrique Blas (GUA) & Juan Diego Blas; L 0-2 | Fernando Ergueta (ARG) & Javier Nicosia; L 0-2 | Tomas Fernandez (CRC) & Jorge Lopez; W 2-0 | Did not advance | |

== Beach volleyball ==
Nicaragua qualified a men's and women's team in the beach volleyball competition.

| Athlete | Event | Preliminary round | | | Quarterfinals | Semifinals | Finals | |
| Athlete | Event | Opposition Score | Opposition Score | Opposition Score | Opposition Score | Opposition Score | Opposition Score | Rank |
|---|---|---|---|---|---|---|---|---|
| Dany López; Gerald Umaña | Men | Aldo Miramontes (MEX); Juan Virgen (MEX); L 12-21, 15-21 | Cristian Redmann (CAN); Bejamin Saxton (CAN); L 22-24, 16-21 | Guillermo Williman (URU); Nicolas Zanotta (URU); L 11-21, 13-23 | Did not advance | | | |
| Amalia Hernández; Lollette Rodríguez | Women | Bibiana Candelas (MEX); Mayra García (MEX); L 5-21, 12-21 | Fabiana Gómez (URU); Lucia Guigou (URU); L 12-21, 15-21 | Nathalia Alfaro (CRC); Ingrid Morales (CRC); L 14-21, 15-21 | Did not advance | | | |

== Boxing ==
Nicaragua qualified a boxing team of four athletes.

Men

| Athlete | Event | Preliminaries | Quarterfinals | Semifinals | Final |
| Athlete | Event | Opposition Result | Opposition Result | Opposition Result | Opposition Result |
|---|---|---|---|---|---|
| Marvin Solano | Flyweight | Eddie Valenzuela (GUA); L 10 – 22 | Did not advance | | |
| Julio Laguna | Lightweight | Yasniel Toledo (CUB); L RSC Round1 3:00 | Did not advance | | |
| Luis Amador | Light welterweight | Valentino Knowles (BAH); L 7 – 17 | Did not advance | | |

Women

| Athlete | Event | Quarterfinals | Semifinals | Final |
| Athlete | Event | Opposition Result | Opposition Result | Opposition Result |
|---|---|---|---|---|
| Ledy Mayorga | Light heavyweight | Alma Nora Ibarra (MEX); L 3 – 16 | Did not advance | |

== Rowing ==
Men

| Athlete(s) | Event | Heats | | Repechage | | Final | |
| Athlete(s) | Event | Time | Rank | Time | Rank | Time | Rank |
|---|---|---|---|---|---|---|---|
| Felipe Jarquin; Vicente Vanega | Coxless pair (M2-) | 7:23.41 | 5th R | 7:25.16 | 5th qB | 7:21.78 | 3rd B |
| Felipe Jarquin; Hector Potoy; Eddy Vanega; Vicente Vanega | Coxless four (M4-) | 6:49.04 | 4th R | 6:41.26 | 5th qB | 6:34.64 | 1st B |

=== Women ===
| Athlete(s) | Event | Heats | | Repechage | | Final | |
| Athlete(s) | Event | Time | Rank | Time | Rank | Time | Rank |
|---|---|---|---|---|---|---|---|
| Ana Vanega; Maria Vanega | Double sculls (W2x) | 8:52.91 | 4th R | 8:56.17 | 5th | Did not advance | |

== Shooting ==
Men

| Event | Athlete | Qualification | | Final | |
| Event | Athlete | Score | Rank | Score | Rank |
|---|---|---|---|---|---|
| 10 m air pistol | Jaime Ramon Davila | 542- 4x | 32nd | Did not advance | |
| 10 m air pistol | Pablo Alejandro Guerrero | 521- 4x | 33rd | Did not advance | |
| 10 m air rifle | Walter Antonio Martínez | 569-20x | 22nd | Did not advance | |
| 25 m rapid fire pistol | Jaime Ramon Davila | 508- 6x | 14th | Did not advance | |
| 50 m pistol | Jaime Ramon Davila | 520-10x | 23rd | Did not advance | |
| 50 m pistol | Pablo Alejandro Guerrero | 477- 4x | 28th | Did not advance | |
| 50 m rifle prone | Walter Antonio Martínez | 573-21x | 24th | Did not advance | |
| 50 m rifle three positions | Walter Antonio Martínez | 1094- 29x | 20th | Did not advance | |

== Swimming ==
Nicaragua qualified three swimmers.

Men

| Event | Athletes | Heats | | Final | |
| Event | Athletes | Time | Position | Time | Position |
|---|---|---|---|---|---|
| 200 m Butterfly | Victor Lopez Cantera | 2:10.22 | 15th qB | 2:09.19 | 7th B |
| 10 km marathon | Omar Núñez | | | 2:19:16.8 | 16th |

Women

| Event | Athletes | Heats | | Final | |
| Event | Athletes | Time | Position | Time | Position |
|---|---|---|---|---|---|
| 100 m butterfly | Dalia Tórrez Zamora | 1:08.65 | 23rd | Did not advance | |

== Taekwondo ==
Nicaragua received a wild card to send one male taekwondo athlete.

Men

| Athlete | Event | Round of 16 | Quarterfinals | Semifinals | Final |
| Athlete | Event | Opposition Result | Opposition Result | Opposition Result | Opposition Result |
|---|---|---|---|---|---|
| Michael Antonio Rodriguez | Heavyweight (-80kg) | Sebastian Crismanich (ARG); L 0 – 12 | Did not advance | | |

== Triathlon ==
Nicaragua received a wild card in the men's triathlon event.

Men

| Athlete | Event | Swim (1.5 km) | Trans 1 | Bike (40 km) | Trans 2 | Run (10 km) | Total | Rank |
|---|---|---|---|---|---|---|---|---|
| Francisco Lopez | Individual | DNF | | | | | | |

== Weightlifting ==
Nicaragua qualified one male athlete and one female athlete.

| Athlete | Event | Snatch | | | Clean & jerk | | | Total | Rank |
| Athlete | Event | Attempt 1 | Attempt 2 | Attempt 3 | Attempt 1 | Attempt 2 | Attempt 3 | Total | Rank |
|---|---|---|---|---|---|---|---|---|---|
| Eddy Fernando Peña | Men's 69 kg | 105 | 110 | ~~115~~ | 130 | 140 | ~~147~~ | 250 | 8th |
| Silvia Artola | Women's 48 kg | 65 | 70 | 73 | 92 | 97 | ~~100~~ | 170 | 5th |

== Wrestling ==
Nicaragua qualified one athlete in the 55 kg men's Greco-Roman category.

Men

Greco-Roman

| Athlete | Event | Quarterfinals | Semifinals | Final |
| Athlete | Event | Opposition Result | Opposition Result | Opposition Result |
|---|---|---|---|---|
| Alberto Mendieta | 55 kg | Gustavo Balart (CUB); L PO 0 – 3 | | Bronze medal match: Juan Carlos Lopez (COL); L PP 1 – 3 |
