= Nicaragua at the 2024 Summer Olympics =

- IOC code: NCA
- NOC: Comité Olímpico Nicaragüense

in Paris, France 26 July 2024 – 11 August 2024
- Competitors: 7 (1 man and 6 women) in 6 sports
- Flag bearers (opening): Gerald Hernández & Izayana Marenco
- Flag bearer (closing): María Carmona
- Medals: Gold 0 Silver 0 Bronze 0 Total 0

Summer Olympics appearances (overview)
- 1968; 1972; 1976; 1980; 1984; 1988; 1992; 1996; 2000; 2004; 2008; 2012; 2016; 2020; 2024

Nicaragua competed at the 2024 Summer Olympics in Paris, France from 26 July to 11 August 2024. It was the nation's fifteenth appearance at the Summer Olympics, having competed at every Games since 1968 with the exception of the 1988 Summer Olympics in Seoul because of its partial support of the North Korean boycott.

== Competitors ==
The following is the list of number of competitors in the Games.

Sport	Men	Women	Total
Athletics	0	1	1
Judo	0	1	1
Rowing	0	1	1
Shooting	0	1	1
Surfing	0	1	1
Swimming	1	1	2
Total	1	6	7

== Athletics ==
Nicaraguan track and field athletes achieved the entry standards for Paris 2024, either by passing the direct qualifying mark (or time for track and road races) or by world ranking, in the following events (a maximum of 3 athletes each):

Key

- Note–Ranks given for track events are within the athlete's heat only
- Q = Qualified for the next round
- q = Qualified for the next round as a fastest loser or, in field events, by position without achieving the qualifying target
- NR = National record
- N/A = Round not applicable for the event
- Bye = Athlete not required to compete in round

Track events

Athlete	Event	Preliminary		Heat		Semifinal		Final	
Athlete	Event	Result	Rank	Result	Rank	Result	Rank	Result	Rank
María Carmona	Women's 100 m	11.88	11	12.00	67	Did not advance			

== Judo ==
Nicaragua entered one judoka for the 2024 Summer Olympics. Izayana Marenco qualified for the games through the allocations of universality places.

Athlete	Event	Round of 64	Round of 32	Round of 16	Quarterfinals	Semifinals	Final
Athlete	Event	Opposition Result	Opposition Result	Opposition Result	Opposition Result	Opposition Result	Rank
Izayana Marenco	Women's +78 kg	—N/a	Portuondo-Isasi (CAN); W 10–00	Souza (BRA); L 00–10	Did not advance		

== Rowing ==
Nicaraguan rowers entered one boat in the women's single sculls for the Games, after receiving the allocations of universality spots.

Athlete	Event	Heats		Repechage		Semifinals		Final	
Athlete	Event	Time	Rank	Time	Rank	Time	Rank	Time	Rank
Evidelia González	Women's single sculls	8:23.25	6 R	8:26.23	4 SE/F	8:43.78	3 FE	8:08.61	30

Qualification Legend: FA=Final A (medal); FB=Final B (non-medal); FC=Final C (non-medal); FD=Final D (non-medal); FE=Final E (non-medal); FF=Final F (non-medal); SA/B=Semifinals A/B; SC/D=Semifinals C/D; SE/F=Semifinals E/F; QF=Quarterfinals; R=Repechage

== Shooting ==
Nicaraguan shooters achieved one quota places for Paris 2024 based on the allocations of universality spots.

Athlete	Event	Qualification		Final	
Athlete	Event	Points	Rank	Points	Rank
Mariel López Pavón	Women's 10 m air rifle	617.5	41	Did not advance	

== Surfing ==
For the first time, Nicaragua entered one surfer into the summer Olympic competitions. Candelaria Resano obtained one spot for her nation through the allocations universality spots.

Athlete	Event	Round 1		Round 2	Round 3	Quarterfinal	Semifinal	Final / BM	
Athlete	Event	Score	Rank	Opposition Result	Opposition Result	Opposition Result	Opposition Result	Opposition Result	Rank
Candelaria Resano	Women's shortboard	9.43	3 R2	Weston-Webb (BRA); L 3.30–9.50	Did not advance				

== Swimming ==
Nicaragua sent two swimmers to compete at the 2024 Paris Olympics.

Athlete	Event	Heat		Semifinal		Final	
Athlete	Event	Time	Rank	Time	Rank	Time	Rank
Gerald Hernández	Men's 200 m butterfly	2:06.80	27	Did not advance			
María Schutzmeier	Women's 100 m butterfly	1:03.18	30	Did not advance			
