= Nicaragua at the 2016 Summer Olympics =

- IOC code: NCA
- NOC: Comité Olímpico Nicaragüense

in Rio de Janeiro
- Competitors: 5 in 4 sports
- Flag bearer: Rafael Lacayo
- Medals: Gold 0 Silver 0 Bronze 0 Total 0

Summer Olympics appearances (overview)
- 1968; 1972; 1976; 1980; 1984; 1988; 1992; 1996; 2000; 2004; 2008; 2012; 2016; 2020; 2024

Nicaragua competed at the 2016 Summer Olympics in Rio de Janeiro, Brazil, from 5 to 21 August 2016. This was the nation's thirteenth appearance at the Summer Olympics, with the exception of the 1988 Summer Olympics in Seoul because of its partial support to the North Korean boycott.

Nicaragua Olympic Committee (Spanish: Comité Olímpico Nicaragüense) sent the nation's smallest delegation to the Games since 2004. A total of five athletes, three men and two women, were selected to the Nicaraguan team across four different sports. Majority of Nicaraguan athletes made their Olympic debut in Rio de Janeiro, except for butterfly swimmer Dalia Torrez Zamora, who attended her third Games as the oldest (aged 26) and most experienced competitor. Meanwhile, air pistol shooter Rafael Lacayo, the youngest of the team (aged 17), led the delegation as the nation's flag bearer in the opening ceremony. Nicaragua, however, has yet to win its first ever Olympic medal.

== Athletics ==
Nicaraguan athletes have so far achieved qualifying standards in the following athletics events (up to a maximum of 3 athletes in each event):

Key

- Note–Ranks given for track events are within the athlete's heat only
- Q = Qualified for the next round
- q = Qualified for the next round as a fastest loser or, in field events, by position without achieving the qualifying target
- NR = National record
- N/A = Round not applicable for the event
- Bye = Athlete not required to compete in round

Track & road events

Athlete	Event	Heat		Semifinal		Final	
Athlete	Event	Result	Rank	Result	Rank	Result	Rank
Erick Rodríguez	Men's 1500 m	4:00.30	15	Did not advance			

== Shooting ==
Nicaragua has received an invitation from the Tripartite Commission to send a men's pistol shooter to the Olympics.

Athlete	Event	Qualification		Final	
Athlete	Event	Points	Rank	Points	Rank
Rafael Lacayo	Men's 10 m air pistol	569	39	Did not advance	

Qualification Legend: Q = Qualify for the next round; q = Qualify for the bronze medal (shotgun)

== Swimming ==
Nicaragua has received a Universality invitation from FINA to send two swimmers (one male and one female) to the Olympics.

Athlete	Event	Heat		Semifinal		Final	
Athlete	Event	Time	Rank	Time	Rank	Time	Rank
Miguel Mena	Men's 100 m freestyle	53.40	55	Did not advance			
Dalia Torrez Zamora	Women's 100 m butterfly	1:05.81	39	Did not advance			

== Weightlifting ==
Nicaragua has received an invitation from the Tripartite Commission to send Scarleth Mercado in the women's featherweight category (53 kg) to the Olympics.

Athlete	Event	Snatch		Clean & Jerk		Total	Rank
Athlete	Event	Result	Rank	Result	Rank	Total	Rank
Scarleth Mercado	Women's −53 kg	66	11	89	10	155	10

== See also ==
- Nicaragua at the 2015 Pan American Games
