= Nicaragua at the 1992 Summer Olympics =

- IOC code: NCA
- NOC: Comité Olímpico Nicaragüense

in Barcelona
- Competitors: 8 (7 men and 1 woman) in 6 sports
- Flag bearer: Magdiel Gutiérrez
- Medals: Gold 0 Silver 0 Bronze 0 Total 0

Summer Olympics appearances (overview)
- 1968; 1972; 1976; 1980; 1984; 1988; 1992; 1996; 2000; 2004; 2008; 2012; 2016; 2020; 2024

Nicaragua competed at the 1992 Summer Olympics in Barcelona, Spain. Eight competitors, seven men and one woman, took part in nine events in six sports.

== Competitors ==
The following is the list of number of competitors in the Games.

Sport	Men	Women	Total
Athletics	1	0	1
Boxing	2	–	2
Cycling	0	1	1
Shooting	1	0	1
Weightlifting	2	–	2
Wrestling	1	–	1
Total	7	1	8

== Athletics ==
Men's Marathon

- William Aguirre – 2:34.18 (→ 73rd place)

== Boxing ==
Men's Featherweight (– 57 kg)

- Eddy Sáenz

- First Round – Lost to Victoriano Damian (DOM), 14:23

Men's Welterweight (– 67 kg)

- Mario Romero

- First Round – Defeated Khyber Shah (PAK), 7:2
- Second Round – Lost to Andreas Otto (GER), RSCH-2

== Cycling ==
One female cyclist represented Nicaragua in 1992.

Women's Individual Road Race

- Olga Sacasa

Women's 1.000m Sprint

- Olga Sacasa

Women's 3.000m Individual Pursuit

- Olga Sacasa

- Final – 16th place overall; did not qualify semi-finals – top 8 places went to semi-finals.

== Shooting ==
Men's Air Pistol (10 metres)

- Norman Ortega

== Weightlifting ==
Men's Flyweight

- Alvaro Marenco

Men's Bantamweight

- Orlando Vásquez

== Wrestling ==
Men's Freestyle Heavyweight

- Magdiel Gutiérrez

== See also ==
- Nicaragua at the 1991 Pan American Games
