= Nicaragua at the 2008 Summer Olympics =

- IOC code: NCA
- NOC: Comité Olímpico Nicaragüense

in Beijing
- Competitors: 6 in 4 sports
- Flag bearer: Alexis Argüello
- Medals: Gold 0 Silver 0 Bronze 0 Total 0

Summer Olympics appearances (overview)
- 1968; 1972; 1976; 1980; 1984; 1988; 1992; 1996; 2000; 2004; 2008; 2012; 2016; 2020; 2024

Nicaragua competed at the 2008 Summer Olympics in Beijing. The country's flag-bearer at the Opening ceremony was boxer Alexis Arguello.

== Athletics ==
Men

Athlete	Event	Heat		Quarterfinal		Semifinal		Final	
Athlete	Event	Result	Rank	Result	Rank	Result	Rank	Result	Rank
Juan Zeledon	200 m	23.39	9	Did not advance					

Women

Athlete	Event	Heat		Quarterfinal		Semifinal		Final	
Athlete	Event	Result	Rank	Result	Rank	Result	Rank	Result	Rank
Jessica Aguilera	100 m	13.15	7	Did not advance					

Key

- Note–Ranks given for track events are within the athlete's heat only
- Q = Qualified for the next round
- q = Qualified for the next round as a fastest loser or, in field events, by position without achieving the qualifying target
- NR = National record
- N/A = Round not applicable for the event
- Bye = Athlete not required to compete in round

== Shooting ==
Men

Athlete	Event	Qualification		Final	
Athlete	Event	Points	Rank	Points	Rank
Walter Martínez	10 m air rifle	569	50	Did not advance	
Walter Martínez	50 m rifle prone	576	55	Did not advance	

== Swimming ==
Men

Athlete	Event	Heat		Semifinal		Final	
Athlete	Event	Time	Rank	Time	Rank	Time	Rank
Omar Núñez	50 m freestyle	26.00	72	Did not advance			

Women

Athlete	Event	Heat		Semifinal		Final	
Athlete	Event	Time	Rank	Time	Rank	Time	Rank
Dalia Torrez Zamora	50 m freestyle	27.81	53	Did not advance			

== Weightlifting ==
Athlete	Event	Snatch		Clean & Jerk		Total	Rank
Athlete	Event	Result	Rank	Result	Rank	Total	Rank
Karla Moreno	Women's −48 kg	65	11	85	11	150	11

== See also ==
- Nicaragua at the 2007 Pan American Games
- Nicaragua at the 2010 Central American and Caribbean Games
