= Nicaragua at the 2000 Summer Olympics =

- IOC code: NCA
- NOC: Comité Olímpico Nicaragüense

in Sydney
- Competitors: 6 (4 men and 2 women) in 5 sports
- Flag bearer: Walter Martínez
- Medals: Gold 0 Silver 0 Bronze 0 Total 0

Summer Olympics appearances (overview)
- 1968; 1972; 1976; 1980; 1984; 1988; 1992; 1996; 2000; 2004; 2008; 2012; 2016; 2020; 2024

Nicaragua competed at the 2000 Summer Olympics in Sydney, Australia.

== Competitors ==
The following is the list of number of competitors in the Games.

| Sport | Men | Women | Total |
|---|---|---|---|
| Athletics | 0 | 1 | 1 |
| Shooting | 1 | 0 | 1 |
| Swimming | 1 | 1 | 2 |
| Taekwondo | 1 | 0 | 1 |
| Weightlifting | 1 | 0 | 1 |
| Total | 4 | 2 | 6 |

== Athletics ==
Key

- Note–Ranks given for track events are within the athlete's heat only
- Q = Qualified for the next round by position in race or, in field events, by achieving the automatic qualification target
- q = Qualified for the next round as a fastest loser or, in field events, by position without achieving the qualifying target

| Athlete | Event | Heat | | Quarterfinal | | Semifinal | | Final | |
| Athlete | Event | Time | Rank | Time | Rank | Time | Rank | Time | Rank |
|---|---|---|---|---|---|---|---|---|---|
| Maritza Figueroa | Women's 400 m | 58.82 | 8 | Did not advance | | | | | |

== Shooting ==
| Athlete | Event | Qualification | | Final | | Total | |
| Athlete | Event | Points | Rank | Points | Rank | Points | Rank |
|---|---|---|---|---|---|---|---|
| Walter Martínez | Men's 10 m air rifle | 571 | 46 | Did not advance | | | |

== Swimming ==
| Athlete | Event | Heat | | Semifinal | | Final | |
| Athlete | Event | Time | Rank | Time | Rank | Time | Rank |
|---|---|---|---|---|---|---|---|
| Marcelino López | Men's 400 m freestyle | 4:18.89 | 46 | Did not advance | | | |
| Fernanda Cuadra | Women's 200 m individual medley | 2:38.25 | 36 | Did not advance | | | |

== Taekwondo ==
| Athlete | Event | Round of 16 | Quarterfinals | Semifinals | Repechage Quarterfinals | Repechage Semifinals | Final / BM | |
| Athlete | Event | Opposition Result | Opposition Result | Opposition Result | Opposition Result | Opposition Result | Opposition Result | Rank |
|---|---|---|---|---|---|---|---|---|
| Carlos Delgado | Men's +80 kg | Bye | Kim (KOR); L 0–5 | Did not advance | Al-Dosari (KSA); L 1–3 | Did not advance | | |

== Weightlifting ==
Men

| Athlete | Event | Snatch | | | Clean & jerk | | | Total | Rank |
| Athlete | Event | 1 | 2 | 3 | 1 | 2 | 3 | Total | Rank |
|---|---|---|---|---|---|---|---|---|---|
| Orlando Vásquez | – 56 kg | 102.5 | ~~107.5~~ | ~~107.5~~ | 130.0 | ~~135.0~~ | ~~135.0~~ | 232.5 | 18 |

== See also ==
- Nicaragua at the 1999 Pan American Games
