= Weightlifting at the 2019 Pan American Games – Women's 64 kg =

Weightlifting – Women's 64 kg at the 2019 Pan American Games
- Venue: Coliseo Mariscal Caceres
- Dates: July 29
- Competitors: 11 from 10 nations

Medalists
Gold medal	Mercedes Pérez	Colombia
Silver medal	Mattie Sasser	United States
Bronze medal	Angie Palacios	Ecuador

The women's 64 kg competition of the weightlifting events at the 2019 Pan American Games in Lima, Peru, was held on July 29 at the Coliseo Mariscal Caceres.

== Results ==
11 athletes from ten countries took part.

Rank	Athlete	Nation	Group	Snatch (kg)				Clean & Jerk (kg)				Total
Rank	Athlete	Nation	Group	1	2	3	Result	1	2	3	Result	Total
1st place, gold medalist(s)	Mercedes Pérez	Colombia	A	100	~~104~~	105	105	127	130	~~135~~	130	235
2nd place, silver medalist(s)	Mattie Sasser	United States	A	96	100	102	102	125	128	130	130	232
3rd place, bronze medalist(s)	Angie Palacios	Ecuador	A	98	103	105	105	~~118~~	118	123	123	228
4	Maude Charron	Canada	A	~~97~~	97	101	101	~~123~~	123	~~128~~	123	224
5	Marina Rodríguez	Cuba	A	96	~~100~~	~~100~~	96	121	126	~~129~~	126	222
6	Sema Ludrick	Nicaragua	A	82	86	89	89	106	112	~~115~~	112	201
7	Maria Luz Casadevall	Argentina	A	81	85	88	88	101	105	108	108	196
8	Eldi Paredes	Peru	A	81	~~85~~	~~85~~	81	106	111	~~113~~	111	192
9	Lesbia Cruz	Guatemala	A	80	~~83~~	~~84~~	80	102	~~106~~	108	108	188
10	Angie Cárdenas	Peru	A	78	81	~~84~~	81	~~106~~	106	~~110~~	106	187
11	Laura Zamora	Costa Rica	A	62	66	~~70~~	66	85	~~90~~	~~90~~	85	151

== New records ==
Clean & Jerk	130 kg	Mercedes Pérez (COL)	AM, PR
Total	235 kg	Mercedes Pérez (COL)	AM, PR
