= Nicaragua at the 1996 Summer Olympics =

- IOC code: NCA
- NOC: Comité Olímpico Nicaragüense

in Atlanta
- Competitors: 26 (25 men and 1 woman) in 5 sports
- Flag bearer: Walter Martínez
- Medals: Gold 0 Silver 0 Bronze 0 Total 0

Summer Olympics appearances (overview)
- 1968; 1972; 1976; 1980; 1984; 1988; 1992; 1996; 2000; 2004; 2008; 2012; 2016; 2020; 2024

Nicaragua competed at the 1996 Summer Olympics in Atlanta, United States.

== Competitors ==
The following is the list of number of competitors in the Games.

Sport	Men	Women	Total
Athletics	1	1	2
Baseball	20	–	20
Judo	2	0	2
Shooting	1	0	1
Swimming	1	0	1
Total	25	1	26

== Athletics ==
Key

- Note–Ranks given for track events are within the athlete's heat only
- Q = Qualified for the next round
- q = Qualified for the next round as a fastest loser or, in field events, by position without achieving the qualifying target

Athlete	Event	Heat		Quarterfinal		Semifinal		Final	
Athlete	Event	Time	Rank	Time	Rank	Time	Rank	Time	Rank
William Aguirre	Men's Marathon	—N/a						2:37.02	99
Marta Portoblanco	Women's 5000 m	18:42.78	15	—N/a				did not advance	

== Baseball ==
=== Men's team competition ===
Nicaragua's debut performance at the Olympic baseball tournament resulted in a semifinal run for the team. They defeated Italy, Australia, South Korea, and the Netherlands in the preliminary round, losing to the three eventual medallists Cuba, Japan, and the United States. This put the Nicaraguans in fourth place for the preliminary round, setting up a semifinal match against Cuba. This game resulted in extending Cuba's winning streak to 17 games, and relegating Nicaragua to the bronze medal game, which it lost to the United States.

Summary

Team	Event	Round robin								Semifinal	Final / BM	
Team	Event	Opposition Result	Opposition Result	Opposition Result	Opposition Result	Opposition Result	Opposition Result	Opposition Result	Rank	Opposition Result	Opposition Result	Rank
Nicaragua men	Men's tournament	United States; L 1–4	Italy; W 7–2	South Korea; W 8–3	Netherlands; W 5–0	Japan; L 6–13	Australia; W 10–0	Cuba; L 7-8	4 Q	Cuba; L 1–8	Bronze medal game United States; L 3–10	4

Team Roster
- Bayardo Davila
- Martín Aleman
- Norman Cardozo
- Oswaldo Mairena
- Nemesio Porras
- José Luis Quiroz
- Carlos Alberto Berrios
- Sandy Moreno
- Omar Obando
- José Ramon Padilla
- Fredy Zamora
- Julio César Osejo
- Eduardo Bojorge
- Asdrudes Flores
- Anibal Vega
- Erasmo Baca
- Luis Daniel Miranda
- Fredy Corea
- Jorge Luis Avellan
- Henry Roa

== Judo ==
Men

Athlete	Event	Round of 64	Round of 32	Round of 16	Quarterfinals	Semifinals	Repechage			Final	
Athlete	Event	Round of 64	Round of 32	Round of 16	Quarterfinals	Semifinals	Round 1	Round 2	Round 3	Final	
Athlete	Event	Opposition Result	Opposition Result	Opposition Result	Opposition Result	Opposition Result	Opposition Result	Opposition Result	Opposition Result	Opposition Result	Rank
Ricky Dixon	–78 kg	Bye	Dott (GER); L	Did not advance			Laats (BEL); L	Did not advance			
Arnulfo Betancourt	+95 kg	Bye	Ogawa (JPN); L	Did not advance			Papaioannou (GRE); L w/o	Did not advance			

== Shooting ==
Men

Athlete	Event	Qualification		Final	
Athlete	Event	Points	Rank	Points	Rank
Walter Martínez	10 m air rifle	566	44	Did not advance	

== Swimming ==
Men

Athlete	Event	Heats		Final A/B	
Athlete	Event	Time	Rank	Time	Rank
Walter Soza	200 m butterfly	2:04.66	36	Did not advance	
Walter Soza	200 m individual medley	2:06.15	20	Did not advance	
Walter Soza	400 m individual medley	4:32.11	22	Did not advance	

== See also ==
- Nicaragua at the 1995 Pan American Games
