= Weightlifting at the 2015 Pan American Games – Women's 63 kg =

Weightlifting – Women's 63 kg at the 2015 Pan American Games
- Venue: Oshawa Sports Centre
- Dates: July 13
- Competitors: 8 from 8 nations

Medalists
| Gold medal | Mercedes Pérez | Colombia |
| Silver medal | Marina Rodríguez | Cuba |
| Bronze medal | Bruna Nascimento Piloto | Brazil |

The women's 63 kg competition of the weightlifting events at the 2015 Pan American Games in Toronto, Canada, was held on July 13 at the Oshawa Sports Centre. The defending champion was Maria Escobar from Ecuador.

Each lifter performed in both the snatch and clean and jerk lifts, with the final score being the sum of the lifter's best result in each. The athlete received three attempts in each of the two lifts; the score for the lift was the heaviest weight successfully lifted.

== Schedule ==
All times are Eastern Daylight Time (UTC-4).

| Date | Time | Round |
|---|---|---|
| July 12, 2015 | 16:30 | Final |

== Results ==
8 athletes from eight countries took part.

| Rank | Name | Country | Group | B.weight (kg) | Snatch (kg) | Clean & Jerk (kg) | Total (kg) |
|---|---|---|---|---|---|---|---|
| 1st place, gold medalist(s) | Mercedes Pérez | Colombia | A | 62.74 | 103 | 132 | 235 |
| 2nd place, silver medalist(s) | Marina Rodriguez | Cuba | A | 62.25 | 89 | 114 | 203 |
| 3rd place, bronze medalist(s) | Bruna Nascimento Piloto | Brazil | A | 62.15 | 90 | 112 | 202 |
| 4 | Massiel Rojas | Chile | A | 61.74 | 85 | 112 | 197 |
| 5 | Lesbia Cruz | Guatemala | A | 61.69 | 82 | 105 | 187 |
| 6 | Silvia Artola | Nicaragua | A | 62.74 | 81 | 105 | 186 |
| 7 | Angie Cárdenas | Peru | A | 62.08 | 79 | 103 | 182 |
| 8 | Jennifer Piter | Aruba | A | 62.08 | 77 | 95 | 172 |
