= Nicaragua at the 1991 Pan American Games =

- IOC code: NIC
- NOC: Comité Olímpico Nicaragüense
- Website: www.ind.gob.ni/comiteolimpico.php

in Havana 8–18 August 1991
- Medals Ranked 17th: Gold 0 Silver 1 Bronze 2 Total 3

Pan American Games appearances (overview)
- 1951; 1955; 1959; 1963; 1967; 1971; 1975; 1979; 1983; 1987; 1991; 1995; 1999; 2003; 2007; 2011; 2015; 2019; 2023

The 11th Pan American Games were held in Havana, Cuba from August 2 to August 18, 1991.

== Medals ==
=== Bronze ===
===== Weightlifting =====
- Men's Flyweight (– 52 kg): Orlando Vásquez

== See also ==
- Nicaragua at the 1992 Summer Olympics
