= Nicaragua at the Pan American Games =

- IOC code: NIC
- NOC: Comité Olímpico Nicaragüense
- Website: www.ind.gob.ni/comiteolimpico.php
- Medals Ranked 35th: Gold 0 Silver 6 Bronze 10 Total 16

Pan American Games appearances (overview)
- 1951; 1955; 1959; 1963; 1967; 1971; 1975; 1979; 1983; 1987; 1991; 1995; 1999; 2003; 2007; 2011; 2015; 2019; 2023

Nicaragua has competed at the Pan American Games since the first edition of the multi-sport event in 1951. It has missed three Pan American Games (1955, 1963 and 1979).

== Pan American Games ==
=== Medals by games ===
Year	Host city	Gold	Silver	Bronze	Total
1951	(Argentina) Buenos Aires	0	0	0	0
1959	(United States) Chicago	0	0	0	0
1967	(Canada) Winnipeg	0	0	0	0
1971	(Colombia) Cali	0	0	0	0
1975	Mexico City	0	0	1	1
1983	(Venezuela) Caracas	0	1	0	1
1987	(United States) Indianapolis	0	0	0	0
1991	(Cuba) Havana	0	1	2	3
1995	(Argentina) Mar del Plata	0	2	2	4
1999	(Canada) Winnipeg	0	0	0	0
2003	(Dominican Republic) Santo Domingo	0	0	0	0
2007	(Brazil) Rio de Janeiro	0	0	2	2
2011	(Mexico) Guadalajara	0	0	0	0
2015	(Canada) Toronto	0	0	0	0
2019	(Peru) Lima	0	0	3	3
2023	(Chile) Santiago	0	2	0	2
Total		0	6	10	16

== Junior Pan American Games ==
=== Medals by games ===
Games	Gold	Silver	Bronze	Total	Rank
(Colombia) 2021 Cali-Valle	0	1	0	1	22nd
(Paraguay) 2025 Asunción	Future event				
Total	0	1	0	1	22nd

=== Medals by sport ===
Sport	Gold	Silver	Bronze	Total
Taekwondo	0	1	0	1
Totals (1 entries)	0	1	0	1

=== Medalists ===
Medal	Name	Games	Sport	Event
Silver	David Robleto	2021 Cali-Valle	Taekwondo	Men's 80 kg
