= Orlando Vasquez =

Orlando Vasquez may refer to:

- Orlando Vásquez (weightlifter, born 1969), Nicaraguan weightlifter
- Orlando Vasquez Morales (born 1997), a Nicaraguan Olympic weightlifting record holder
