= Nicaragua at the 2004 Summer Olympics =

- IOC code: NCA
- NOC: Comité Olímpico Nicaragüense

in Athens
- Competitors: 5 in 3 sports
- Flag bearer: Svitlana Kashchenko
- Medals: Gold 0 Silver 0 Bronze 0 Total 0

Summer Olympics appearances (overview)
- 1968; 1972; 1976; 1980; 1984; 1988; 1992; 1996; 2000; 2004; 2008; 2012; 2016; 2020; 2024

Nicaragua competed at the 2004 Summer Olympics in Athens, Greece, from 13 to 29 August 2004.

== Athletics ==
Chinese athletes have so far achieved qualifying standards in the following athletics events (up to a maximum of 3 athletes in each event at the 'A' Standard, and 1 at the 'B' Standard).

Men
Track & road events

Athlete	Event	Heat		Quarterfinal		Semifinal		Final	
Athlete	Event	Result	Rank	Result	Rank	Result	Rank	Result	Rank
Carlos Abaunza	100 m	11.17	8	did not advance					

Women
Field events

Athlete	Event	Qualification		Final	
Athlete	Event	Distance	Position	Distance	Position
Dalila Rugama	Javelin throw	51.42	40	did not advance	

Key

- Note–Ranks given for track events are within the athlete's heat only
- Q = Qualified for the next round
- q = Qualified for the next round as a fastest loser or, in field events, by position without achieving the qualifying target
- NR = National record
- N/A = Round not applicable for the event
- Bye = Athlete not required to compete in round

== Shooting ==
One Nicaraguan shooter qualified to compete in the following events:

Women

Athlete	Event	Qualification		Final	
Athlete	Event	Points	Rank	Points	Rank
Svitlana Kashchenko	10 m air rifle	383	41	did not advance	
Svitlana Kashchenko	50 m rifle 3 positions	563	28	did not advance	

== Swimming ==
Men

Athlete	Event	Heat		Semifinal		Final	
Athlete	Event	Time	Rank	Time	Rank	Time	Rank
Fernando Medrano Medina	100 m butterfly	1:00.91	58	did not advance			

Women

Athlete	Event	Heat		Semifinal		Final	
Athlete	Event	Time	Rank	Time	Rank	Time	Rank
Geraldine Arce	50 m freestyle	28.73	51	did not advance			

== See also ==
- Nicaragua at the 2003 Pan American Games
- Nicaragua at the 2004 Summer Paralympics
