= Boxing at the 2019 Pan American Games – Qualification =

The following is the qualification system and qualified athletes for the boxing at the 2019 Pan American Games competitions.

== Qualification system ==
A total of 120 boxers will qualify to compete at the games (eight per event). The host nation (Peru) received seven automatic qualification spots (five men and two women). The remainder of the spots were awarded at the Pan American Games qualifier held in Managua, Nicaragua in April 2019.

== Qualification timeline ==
Events	Date	Venue
2019 Pan American Games Qualifier	April 4–10, 2019	(Nicaragua) Managua

== Qualification summary ==
The following is a summary of qualified countries per event.

NOC	Men										Women					Total
NOC	49 kg	52 kg	56 kg	60 kg	64 kg	69 kg	75 kg	81 kg	91 kg	+91 kg	51 kg	57 kg	60 kg	69 kg	75 kg	Total
Antigua and Barbuda					X											1
Argentina		X					X					X	X			4
Brazil	X						X	X	X	X		X	X		X	8
Canada								X	X			X	X	X	X	6
Chile		X														1
Colombia	X	X	X	X		X	X		X	X	X	X		X	X	12
Costa Rica					X						X					2
Cuba	X	X	X	X	X	X	X	X	X	X						10
Dominican Republic	X	X	X	X	X	X	X	X	X		X			X		11
Ecuador	X		X		X			X	X						X	6
El Salvador											X	X				2
Guatemala															X	1
Guyana			X													1
Jamaica				X						X						2
Mexico		X						X	X				X	X	X	6
Nicaragua	X					X	X			X	X	X	X	X	X	9
Panama				X										X		2
Peru	X	X	X	X	X	X			X	X	X	X	X			11
Puerto Rico	X	X												X		3
Trinidad and Tobago					X	X	X			X						4
United States			X	X	X	X	X			X	X	X	X	X	X	11
Uruguay			X													1
Venezuela				X	X	X		X			X		X			6
Virgin Islands								X								1
Total: 26 NOCs	8	8	8	8	9	8	8	8	8	8	8	8	8	8	8	121

== Men ==
=== Men's 49 kg ===
Competition	Vacancies	Qualified
Host nation	1	Peru
2019 Pan American Games Qualifier	7	Colombia; Puerto Rico; Nicaragua; Brazil; Cuba; Ecuador; Dominican Republic
TOTAL	8	

=== Men's 52 kg ===
Competition	Vacancies	Qualified
Host nation	1	Peru
2019 Pan American Games Qualifier	7	Cuba; Dominican Republic; Colombia; Puerto Rico; Argentina; Mexico; Chile
TOTAL	8	

=== Men's 56 kg ===
Competition	Vacancies	Qualified
Host nation	1	Peru
2019 Pan American Games Qualifier	7	Dominican Republic; Ecuador; Colombia; United States; Guyana; Uruguay; Cuba
TOTAL	8	

=== Men's 60 kg ===
Competition	Vacancies	Qualified
2019 Pan American Games Qualifier	8	Dominican Republic; Cuba; Venezuela; Colombia; Panama; United States; Peru; Jamaica
TOTAL	8	

=== Men's 64 kg ===
Competition	Vacancies	Qualified
Host nation	1	Peru
2019 Pan American Games Qualifier	8	Cuba; United States; Ecuador; Trinidad and Tobago; Dominican Republic; Venezuela; Costa Rica; Antigua and Barbuda
TOTAL	9	

=== Men's 69 kg ===
Competition	Vacancies	Qualified
Host nation	1	Peru
2019 Pan American Games Qualifier	7	United States; Dominican Republic; Cuba; Venezuela; Nicaragua; Colombia; Trinidad and Tobago
TOTAL	8	

=== Men's 75 kg ===
Competition	Vacancies	Qualified
2019 Pan American Games Qualifier	8	United States; Cuba; Brazil; Dominican Republic; Nicaragua; Argentina; Colombia; Trinidad and Tobago
TOTAL	8	

=== Men's 81 kg ===
Competition	Vacancies	Qualified
2019 Pan American Games Qualifier	8	Cuba; Ecuador; Brazil; Dominican Republic; Mexico; Venezuela; Virgin Islands; Canada
TOTAL	8	

=== Men's 91 kg ===
Competition	Vacancies	Qualified
2019 Pan American Games Qualifier	8	Cuba; Colombia; Dominican Republic; Ecuador; Canada; Peru; Mexico; Brazil
TOTAL	8	

=== Men's +91 kg ===
Competition	Vacancies	Qualified
2019 Pan American Games Qualifier	8	Cuba; Colombia; Nicaragua; United States; Brazil; Trinidad and Tobago; Peru; Jamaica
TOTAL	8	

== Women ==
=== Women's 51 kg ===
Competition	Vacancies	Qualified
2019 Pan American Games Qualifier	8	United States; Costa Rica; Venezuela; Dominican Republic; Peru; Nicaragua; El Salvador; Colombia
TOTAL	8	

=== Women's 57 kg ===
Competition	Vacancies	Qualified
Host nation	1	Peru
2019 Pan American Games Qualifier	7	Argentina; Colombia; Canada; Brazil; United States; El Salvador; Nicaragua
TOTAL	8	

=== Women's 60 kg ===
Competition	Vacancies	Qualified
Host nation	1	Peru
2019 Pan American Games Qualifier	7	United States; Brazil; Venezuela; Canada; Argentina; Mexico; Nicaragua
TOTAL	8	

=== Women's 69 kg ===
Competition	Vacancies	Qualified
2019 Pan American Games Qualifier	8	Panama; United States; Dominican Republic; Puerto Rico; Mexico; Canada; Colombia; Nicaragua
TOTAL	8	

=== Women's 75 kg ===
Competition	Vacancies	Qualified
2019 Pan American Games Qualifier	8	Canada; Colombia; United States; Ecuador; Brazil; Guatemala; Nicaragua; Mexico
TOTAL	8	
