= Taekwondo at the 2023 Pan American Games – Mixed poomsae pairs =

Mixed poomsae pairs at the 2023 Pan American Games
- Venue: Contact Sports Center
- Dates: October 22
- Competitors: 20 from 10 nations

Medalists
Gold medal	Seo Lee Kim; William Arroyo	Mexico
Silver medal	Elian Ortega; Ingrid Darce	Nicaragua
Bronze medal	Luis Colón; Arelis Medina	Puerto Rico
Bronze medal	Katlen Jervez; Mario Troya	Ecuador

The mixed poomsae pairs competition of the taekwondo events at the 2023 Pan American Games in Santiago, Chile, was held on October 22 at the Contact Sports Center. A total of 10 athletes from 10 NOC's competed.

== Qualification ==
A total of 20 athletes (10 men and 10 women) qualified to compete in the Mixed Poomsae pairs event, two for each NOC. The host nation, Chile, automatically qualified automatically and the quotas spots will be awarded at the qualification tournament held in Rio de Janeiro in March 2023. The final quota spots were awarded as wildcards.

== Results ==
The results were as follows:

Position	Athletes	Country	Acc	Pre	Total
1st place, gold medalist(s)	Seo Lee Kim; William Arroyo	Mexico	4.74	3.18	7.92
2nd place, silver medalist(s)	Elian Ortega; Ingrid Darce	Nicaragua	4.66	3.22	7.88
3rd place, bronze medalist(s)	Luis Colón; Arelis Medina	Puerto Rico	4.54	3.06	7.60
3rd place, bronze medalist(s)	Katlen Jervez; Mario Troya	Ecuador	4.50	3.10	7.60
5	Jinsu Ha; Valerie Ho	Canada	4.44	3.12	7.56
6	Anthony Do; Kaitlyn Reclusado	United States	4.46	3.08	7.54
7	Héctor Morales; María Alejandra Higueros	Independent Athletes Team	4.36	3.02	7.38
8	Gabriela Castillo; Hugo del Castillo	Peru	4.22	3.02	7.24
9	Tania Delgado; Darío Navarro	Cuba	4.10	2.70	6.80
10	Jonathan Farías; Constanza Moya	Chile	3.88	2.70	6.58
