= Boxing at the 2019 Pan American Games – Men's 49 kg =

Men's Light flyweight at the 2019 Pan American Games
- Venue: Miguel Grau Coliseum
- Dates: July 29– August 2, 2019
- Competitors: 8 from 8 nations

Medalists
Gold medal	Óscar Collazo	Puerto Rico
Silver medal	Yuberjen Martínez	Colombia
Bronze medal	Kevin Arias	Nicaragua
Bronze medal	Damián Arce	Cuba

The Men's Light flyweight competition of the boxing events at the 2019 Pan American Games in Lima, Peru, was held between 27 July and 2 August 2019 at the Miguel Grau Coliseum.

Like all Pan American boxing events, the competition is a straight single-elimination tournament. Both semifinal losers are awarded bronze medals, so no boxers compete again after their first loss. Bouts consist of a 3 rounds "10-point must" scoring system used in the pro game, where the winner of each round must be awarded 10 points and the loser a lesser amount, and the elimination of the padded headgear. Five judges scored each bout. The winner will be the boxer who scored the most at the end of the match.

== Results ==
=== Bracket ===
Quarterfinals; July 29, 2019
Yuberjen Martínez (COL)	5
Mario Lavegar (DOM)	0
Ronaldo Bezerra (BRA)	2
Kevin Arias (NCA)	3
Damián Arce (CUB)	5
William Peña (PER)	0
Luis Delgado (ECU)	0
Oscar Collazo (PUR)	5

Semifinals; July 30, 2019
Yuberjen Martínez (COL)	5
Kevin Arias (NCA)	0
Damián Arce (CUB)	1
Oscar Collazo (PUR)	4

Final; August 2, 2019
Yuberjen Martínez (COL)	1
Oscar Collazo (PUR)	4
