= Nicaragua at the 1968 Summer Olympics =

- IOC code: NCA (NIC used at these Games)
- NOC: Comité Olímpico Nicaragüense

in Mexico City
- Competitors: 11 in 3 sports
- Flag bearer: Donald Vélez
- Medals: Gold 0 Silver 0 Bronze 0 Total 0

Summer Olympics appearances (overview)
- 1968; 1972; 1976; 1980; 1984; 1988; 1992; 1996; 2000; 2004; 2008; 2012; 2016; 2020; 2024

Nicaragua competed in the Olympic Games for the first time at the 1968 Summer Olympics in Mexico City, Mexico.
