= Nicaragua at the 1984 Summer Olympics =

- IOC code: NCA
- NOC: Comité Olímpico Nicaragüense

in Los Angeles
- Competitors: 5 in 3 sports
- Flag bearer: Gustavo Herrera
- Medals: Gold 0 Silver 0 Bronze 0 Total 0

Summer Olympics appearances (overview)
- 1968; 1972; 1976; 1980; 1984; 1988; 1992; 1996; 2000; 2004; 2008; 2012; 2016; 2020; 2024

Nicaragua competed at the 1984 Summer Olympics in Los Angeles, United States. 25 male competitors represented the country in 3 sports.

== Boxing ==
Bantamweight, Men

- Gustavo Cruz (=17th)

Lightweight, Men

- Omar Méndez (=17th)

Light middleweight, Men

- Mario Centeno (=17th)

== Weightlifting ==
Featherweight, Men

- Alfredo Palma (17th)

Heavyweight I, Men

- Luis Salinas DNF
