= Nicaragua at the 1980 Summer Olympics =

- IOC code: NCA
- NOC: Comité Olímpico Nicaragüense

in Moscow
- Competitors: 5 in 2 sports
- Flag bearer: Xiomara Larios
- Medals: Gold 0 Silver 0 Bronze 0 Total 0

Summer Olympics appearances (overview)
- 1968; 1972; 1976; 1980; 1984; 1988; 1992; 1996; 2000; 2004; 2008; 2012; 2016; 2020; 2024

Nicaragua competed at the 1980 Summer Olympics in Moscow, USSR.

== Results by event ==
=== Athletics ===
Men's 400 m Hurdles

- Leonel Teller

- Heat — did not finish (→ did not advance)

=== Boxing ===
Men's Flyweight (– 51 kg)

- Onofre Ramirez

- First Round — Lost to Petar Lesov (Bulgaria) on points (0-5)

Men's Bantamweight (– 54 kg)

- Ernesto Alguera

- First Round — Bye
- Second Round — Lost to Bernardo Piñango (Venezuela) on points (1-4)

=== Swimming ===
Women's 100m Breaststroke

- Garnet Charwat

- Heats — 1:28.88 (→ did not advance)
