= Nicaragua at the 2003 Pan American Games =

- IOC code: NIC
- NOC: Comité Olímpico Nicaragüense
- Website: www.ind.gob.ni/comiteolimpico.php

in Santo Domingo 1–17 August 2003
- Medals Ranked 29th: Gold 0 Silver 0 Bronze 0 Total 0

Pan American Games appearances (overview)
- 1951; 1955; 1959; 1963; 1967; 1971; 1975; 1979; 1983; 1987; 1991; 1995; 1999; 2003; 2007; 2011; 2015; 2019; 2023

The 14th Pan American Games were held in Santo Domingo, Dominican Republic, from August 1 to August 17, 2003.

== Results by event ==
=== Athletics ===
Road

Athlete	Event	Time	Rank
Cristian Villavicencio	Men's marathon	2:37:28	11

Field

Athlete	Event	Throws						Total	
Athlete	Event	1	2	3	4	5	6	Distance	Rank
Rigoberto Calderón	Men's javelin throw	66.98	63.59	X	—	—	—	66.98 m	10
Dalila Rugama	Women's javelin throw	X	X	44.50	—	—	—	44.50 m	9

=== Baseball ===
Preliminary round
Group	Pld	W	L	RF	RA	Pct
B	4	4	0			1.000
Group B: Nicaragua, USA, Dominican Republic, Guatemala, Bahamas

Knockout rounds
Round	Opponent	Score
Quarter finals	'Panama	2:5
Semi-finals	'Cuba	2:1
Third place	(Mexico) 'Medxico	6:2
Placed:	4th	

=== Boxing ===
Athlete	Event	Round of 16	Quarterfinals	Semifinals	Final
Athlete	Event	Opposition Result	Opposition Result	Opposition Result	Opposition Result
Saúl Baca	Light flyweight	Tamara (COL); L RSCO-2	did not advance		
Carlos Guevara	Bantamweight	Perez (COL); L 9-19	did not advance		
José González	Lightweight	Monzón (GUA); W 16-8	Kindelán (CUB); L RSCH-4	did not advance	

== See also ==
- Nicaragua at the 2002 Central American and Caribbean Games
- Nicaragua at the 2004 Summer Olympics
