= Weightlifting at the 2011 Pan American Games – Women's 69 kg =

Weightlifting – Women's 69 kg at the 2011 Pan American Games
- Venue: Weightlifting Forum
- Dates: October 26
- Competitors: 9 from 8 nations

Medalists
Gold medal	Mercedes Pérez	Colombia
Silver medal	Cinthya Domínguez	Mexico
Bronze medal	Aremi Fuentes	Mexico

The women's 69 kg competition of the weightlifting events at the 2011 Pan American Games in Guadalajara, Mexico, was held on October 26 at the Weightlifting Forum. The defending champion was Tulia Angela Medina from Colombia.

Each lifter performed in both the snatch and clean and jerk lifts, with the final score being the sum of the lifter's best result in each. The athlete received three attempts in each of the two lifts; the score for the lift was the heaviest weight successfully lifted. This weightlifting event was the third heaviest women's event at the weightlifting competition, limiting competitors to a maximum of 69 kilograms of body mass.

== Schedule ==
All times are Central Standard Time (UTC-6).

Date	Time	Round
October 26, 2011	12:00	Final

== Results ==
9 athletes from 8 countries took part.

- PR – Pan American Games record

Rank	Name	Country	Group	B.weight (kg)	Snatch (kg)	Clean & Jerk (kg)	Total (kg)
1st place, gold medalist(s)	Mercedes Pérez	Colombia	A	67.74	101	131 PR	232
2nd place, silver medalist(s)	Cinthya Domínguez	Mexico	A	68.93	103	123	226
3rd place, bronze medalist(s)	Aremi Fuentes	Mexico	A	68.27	101	120	221
4	Rosa Tenorio	Ecuador	A	68.55	99	115	214
5	Danica Rue	United States	A	68.21	88	115	203
6	Liliane Menezes	Brazil	A	67.74	90	110	200
7	Norma Figueroa	Puerto Rico	A	68.07	85	110	195
8	Idalmis Rivera	Cuba	A	65.79	83	111	194
–	Angie Toledo	Chile	A	68.15			DNF

== New records ==
The following records were established and improved upon during the competition.

Clean & Jerk	131.0 kg	Mercedes Pérez (COL)	PR
