= Nicaragua at the Olympics =

- IOC code: NCA
- NOC: Comité Olímpico Nicaragüense
- Website: www.con.org.ni
- Medals: Gold 0 Silver 0 Bronze 0 Total 0

Summer appearances
- 1968; 1972; 1976; 1980; 1984; 1988; 1992; 1996; 2000; 2004; 2008; 2012; 2016; 2020; 2024; 2028

Nicaragua first participated at the Olympic Games in 1968, and has sent athletes to compete in every Summer Olympic Games since then, except the 1988 Games which they did not attend due to "athletic and financial considerations." Nicaraguan President Daniel Ortega had previously asserted that Nicaragua would boycott the 1988 Games in support of North Korea. (Note: Ortega first made this claim on February 7, 1986, when he said Nicaragua would not participate in Seoul if North Korea's proposal to co-host were not realized. On September 15, 1986, while visiting North Korea, Ortega repeated his assertion at a banquet hosted by Kim Il Sung that "Nicaragua will not participate in the Games if the co-hosting proposal of the Democratic People's Republic of Korea is not realized". On May 20, 1987, Nicaraguan NOC President Moisés Hassan reiterated his country's intentions, saying "if the 1988 Olympics are not carried out in Pyongyang and Seoul, the two Korean capitals, Nicaragua will not attend this event". Despite these three prior attestations to Nicaragua's boycott intent, on January 16, 1988, in a telex sent by Nicaraguan NOC President Hassan to IOC President Juan Antonio Samaranch, there was no mention of North Korea in the reasons given by Hassan. Instead, Hassan claimed a 'lack of concentration on sport' due to hostilities in Nicaragua, non-qualification of their best athletes through the Pan American Games, and a 'bad economic situation' as being the reasons for Nicaragua's boycott. Samaranch dismissed the reasons in Hassan's telex as false, saying they were "a feeble rationalization of a political decision not to participate", and reminded Hassan in a reply telex that the Nicaraguan NOC would not share in any of the Olympic Solidarity funds for the period of 1988–1992 if it failed to participate in the Seoul Games.)

The nation has never participated in the Winter Olympic Games.

To date, no athletes from Nicaragua have won an Olympic medal, although the baseball team finished in fourth place at the 1996 Summer Olympics.

The National Olympic Committee for Nicaragua was created in 1959 and recognized by the International Olympic Committee that same year.

== Medal tables ==
=== Medals by Summer Games ===
Games	Athletes	Gold	Silver	Bronze	Total	Rank
1968 Mexico City	11	0	0	0	0	–
1972 Munich	8	0	0	0	0	–
1976 Montreal	15	0	0	0	0	–
1980 Moscow	5	0	0	0	0	–
1984 Los Angeles	5	0	0	0	0	–
1988 Seoul	did not participate					
1992 Barcelona	8	0	0	0	0	–
1996 Atlanta	26	0	0	0	0	–
2000 Sydney	6	0	0	0	0	–
2004 Athens	5	0	0	0	0	–
2008 Beijing	5	0	0	0	0	–
2012 London	6	0	0	0	0	–
2016 Rio de Janeiro	5	0	0	0	0	–
2020 Tokyo	8	0	0	0	0	–
2024 Paris	7	0	0	0	0	–
2028 Los Angeles	future event					
2032 Brisbane	future event					
Total		0	0	0	0	–

== See also ==
- List of flag bearers for Nicaragua at the Olympics
- Category:Olympic competitors for Nicaragua
- Nicaragua at the Paralympics
