= Nicaragua at the 2007 Pan American Games =

- IOC code: NIC
- NOC: Comité Olímpico Nicaragüense
- Website: www.ind.gob.ni/comiteolimpico.php

in Rio de Janeiro 13–29 July 2007
- Competitors: 55
- Flag bearer: Christian Villacencio
- Medals Ranked 24th: Gold 0 Silver 0 Bronze 2 Total 2

Pan American Games appearances (overview)
- 1951; 1955; 1959; 1963; 1967; 1971; 1975; 1979; 1983; 1987; 1991; 1995; 1999; 2003; 2007; 2011; 2015; 2019; 2023

The 15th Pan American Games were held in Rio de Janeiro, Brazil from 13 July to 29 July 2007.

== Medals ==
=== Bronze ===
===== Baseball =====
- Men's Team Competition: Nicaragua national baseball team

===== Boxing =====
- Men's Featherweight (– 57 kg): Orlando Rizo

== See also ==
- Nicaragua at the 2008 Summer Olympics
