= Nicaragua at the 1972 Summer Olympics =

- IOC code: NCA
- NOC: Comité Olímpico Nicaragüense

in Munich
- Competitors: 8
- Flag bearer: Donald Vélez
- Medals: Gold 0 Silver 0 Bronze 0 Total 0

Summer Olympics appearances (overview)
- 1968; 1972; 1976; 1980; 1984; 1988; 1992; 1996; 2000; 2004; 2008; 2012; 2016; 2020; 2024

Nicaragua competed at the 1972 Summer Olympics in Munich, West Germany.

== Results by event ==
=== Athletics ===
Men's 800 metres

- Francisco Menocal

- Heat — 1:58.6 (→ did not advance)

=== Boxing ===
Men's Flyweight (– 51 kg)

- Salvador Miranda

- First Round — Lost to Arturo Delgado (MEX), TKO-3
