= Taekwondo at the 2023 Pan American Games – Men's poomsae individual =

Men's poomsae individual at the 2023 Pan American Games
- Venue: Contact Sports Center
- Start date: October 21, 2023
- End date: October 21, 2023
- Competitors: 10 from 10 nations

Medalists
Gold medal	William Arroyo	Mexico
Silver medal	Elian Ortega	Nicaragua
Bronze medal	Luis Colon	Puerto Rico
Bronze medal	Hugo del Castillo	Peru

The men's poomsae individual competition of the taekwondo events at the 2023 Pan American Games in Santiago, Chile, was held on October 21 at the Contact Sports Center. A total of 10 athletes from 10 NOC's competed.

== Qualification ==
A total of 10 athletes qualified to compete in the men's Poomsae individual event. The host nation, Chile, qualified automatically and the quotas spots will be awarded at the qualification tournament held in Rio de Janeiro in March 2023. The final quota spots were awarded as wildcards.

== Results ==
=== Bracket ===
Round of 16
Anthony Do (USA)	7.430
Jinsu Ha (CAN)	7.300
Hector Morales (EAI)	7.110
Mario Troya (ECU)	7.160

Quarterfinals
Elian Ortega (NCA)	7.670
Anthony Do (USA)	7.460
Luis Colon (PUR)	7.410
Jonathan Farias (CHI)	7.360
William Arroyo (MEX)	7.730
Dario Navarro (CUB)	7.470
Mario Troya (ECU)	7.150
Hugo del Castillo (PER)	7.630

Semifinals
Elian Ortega (NCA)	7.760
Luis Colon (PUR)	7.110
William Arroyo (MEX)	7.850
Hugo del Castillo (PER)	7.770

Final
Elian Ortega (NCA)	7.880
William Arroyo (MEX)	7.990
