= Manuel Largaespada =

Nicaraguan cyclist

Personal information
- Full name: Manuel Largaespada

Cycling career
- Sport: Cycling

Manuel Largaespada is a Nicaraguan former cyclist. He competed in the individual road race and team time trial events at the 1976 Summer Olympics.
