= Osmar Bravo =

Nicaraguan boxer (born 1984)

Personal information
- Full name: Osmar Bravo Amador
- Nationality: Nicaragua
- Born: 1 November 1984 (age 41)

Sport
- Sport: Boxing
- Weight class: Light Heavyweight
Medal record
Men's amateur boxing
Representing Nicaragua
Central American and Caribbean Games
Bronze medal – third place	2014 Veracruz	Light heavyweight
Bronze medal – third place	2018 Barranquilla	Light heavyweight
Central American Games
Gold medal – first place	2013 San José	Light heavyweight
Bronze medal – third place	2010 Panamá City	Light heavyweight
Bronze medal – third place	2017 Managua	Light heavyweight

Osmar Bravo Amador (born 1 November 1984 in Nueva Guinea) is an amateur boxer from Nicaragua that qualified for the 2012 Olympics at light heavyweight (81 kg).

Osmar was a semi-finalist at light heavyweight at the 2012 American Boxing Olympic Qualification Tournament, and this finish earned him his Olympic birth. Osmar became the first boxer to qualify for the Olympics from Nicaragua since Mario Romero at the 1992 Summer Olympics. At the 2012 Olympic Games, he beat Montenegrin boxer Bosko Draskovic, before losing to Ukrainian Oleksander Gvozdyk.

Olympic Games
Preceded by Alexis Argüello	Flag bearer for Nicaragua; London 2012	Succeeded by Rafael Lacayo
