= Ingrid Yahoska Narvaez =

Nicaraguan sprinter

Personal information
- Born: February 15, 1994 (age 31)
- Weight: 48 kg (106 lb)

Sport
- Country: Nicaragua
- Sport: Athletics
- Event: 400m

Ingrid Yahoska Narvaez (born 15 February 1994 in Tola) is a Nicaraguan sprinter who specializes in the 400 metres. She represented Nicaragua at the 2012 Summer Olympics.

In 2019, she competed in the women's 400 metres event at the 2019 World Athletics Championships. She did not advance to compete in the semi-finals as she was disqualified after lane infringement.
