= Hamblin González =

Nicaraguan cyclist

Personal information
- Full name: Hamblin González
- Died: 5 September 2001

Cycling career
- Sport: Cycling

Hamblin González (died 5 September 2001) was a Nicaraguan cyclist. He competed in the individual road race and team time trial events at the 1976 Summer Olympics.
