= Lucía Castañeda =

Nicaraguan weightlifter

Personal information
- Born: July 8, 1981 (age 44) Managua, Nicaragua
- Weight: 63 kg (139 lb)

Sport
- Country: Nicaragua
- Sport: Weightlifting
- Event: 63kg
- Updated on 7 August 2012

Lucía Castañeda Gomez (born 8 July 1981) is a weightlifter who competed for Nicaragua at the 2012 Summer Olympics in Women's 63kg. She would finish 9th in the event.
