= Svitlana Kashchenko =

Russian-born Nicaraguan sport shooter (born 1968)

Personal information
- Full name: Svitlana Kashchenko de Lopéz
- Nationality: Nicaragua
- Born: 16 December 1968 (age 57) Yaroslavl, Russian SFSR, Soviet Union
- Height: 1.63 m (5 ft 4 in)
- Weight: 55 kg (121 lb)

Sport
- Sport: Shooting
- Event(s): 10 m air rifle (AR40); 50 m rifle 3 positions (STR3X20)
- Club: Fenitíro

Svitlana Kashchenko de Lopéz (Russian: Светлана Кащенко де Лопес; born 16 December 1968 in Yaroslavl, Russian SFSR, Soviet Union) is a Russian-born Nicaraguan sport shooter. Kashchenko has achieved a ninth-place finish in women's air rifle at the 2003 Pan American Games in Santo Domingo, and later represented Nicaragua at the 2004 Summer Olympics, where she became the nation's flag bearer in the opening ceremony. Throughout her sporting career, Kashchenko has been training for the Nicaraguan Shooting Federation (Spanish: Federación Nicaragüense de Tiro, Fenitíro) in Managua (where she currently resides.

Kashchenko qualified for the Nicaraguan squad in two sport shooting events at the 2004 Summer Olympics in Athens by receiving a wild card entry from ISSF On the first day of the Games, Kashchenko scored a total of 383 points to share a forty-first place tie with Jamaica's Dawn Kobayashi in the women's 10 m air rifle. Six days later, in the 50 m rifle 3 positions, Kashchenko obtained 189 shots in a prone position, 183 in standing, and 191 in kneeling to deliver a twenty-eighth-place finish in a vast field of 33 shooters with a total score of 563.

Olympic Games
Preceded by Walter Martínez	Flag bearer for Nicaragua; Athens 2004	Succeeded by Alexis Argüello
