= Rafael Lacayo =

Nicaraguan sports shooter

Personal information
- Born: 19 November 1998 (age 27)
- Height: 178 cm (5 ft 10 in)
- Weight: 59 kg (130 lb)

Sport
- Sport: Sports shooting

Rafael Lacayo (born 19 November 1998) is a Nicaraguan sports shooter. He competed in the men's 10 metre air pistol event at the 2016 Summer Olympics. He finished 39th in the qualifying round and did not advance to the finals. He was the flagbearer for Nicaragua during the Parade of Nations.

Olympic Games
Preceded by Osmar Bravo	Flag bearer for Nicaragua; Rio 2016	Succeeded by Edwin Barberena; Sema Ludrick
