= Marina Rodríguez (weightlifter) =

Cuban weightlifter (born 1995)

Personal information
- Born: 2 March 1995 (age 31) Marianao, Cuba
- Height: 1.55 m (5 ft 1 in)
- Weight: 62 kg (137 lb)

Sport
- Country: Cuba
- Sport: Weightlifting
- Event: Women's 63 kg
Medal record
Representing Cuba
Pan American Games
Silver medal – second place	2015 Toronto	63 kg

Marina de la Caridad Rodríguez Mitjan (born 2 March 1995) is a Cuban weightlifter. She competed in the women's 63 kg event at the 2016 Summer Olympics and the 2020 Summer Olympics.
