= Magdiel Gutiérrez =

Nicaraguan wrestler

Personal information
- Born: 14 April 1968 (age 58) Managua, Nicaragua

Sport
- Sport: Wrestling

Magdiel Gutiérrez (born 14 April 1968) is a Nicaraguan wrestler. He competed in the men's freestyle 100 kg at the 1992 Summer Olympics.
