= Walter Martínez (sport shooter) =

Nicaraguan sports shooter

Personal information
- Full name: Walter Antonio Martínez Hernández
- Nationality: Nicaragua
- Born: 14 December 1967 (age 58)
- Height: 1.79 m (5 ft 10 1/2 in)
- Weight: 97 kg (214 lb)

Sport
- Sport: Shooting
- Event(s): 10 m air rifle, 50 m rifle prone

Walter Antonio Martínez Hernández (born December 14, 1967) is a Nicaraguan sport shooter. Martinez made his official debut at the 1996 Summer Olympics in Atlanta, where he placed forty-fourth in the men's 10 m air rifle, with a score of 566 points.

At the 2000 Summer Olympics in Sydney, Martinez was given the privilege and honor of carrying the national flag at the opening ceremony. He competed again for the second time in the 10 m air rifle, where he placed last again out of forty-six shooters in the qualifying rounds, with a slightly improved score of 571 points.

Martinez made a comeback from his eight-year absence at the 2008 Summer Olympics in Beijing, where he competed this time in two rifle shooting events. He placed fiftieth in the men's 10 m air rifle, with a total score of 569 points. Few days later, Martinez competed for his second event, 50 m rifle prone, where he placed fifty-fifth in the qualifying rounds, with a total score of 576 points, just one target ahead from his last attempt of Egypt's Hazem Mohamed.

Olympic Games
Preceded by Magdiel Gutiérrez	Flag bearer for Nicaragua; Atlanta 1996; Sydney 2000	Succeeded by Svitlana Kashchenko
