= Izayana Marenco =

Nicaraguan judoka (born 1992)

Personal information
- Born: 9 October 1992 (age 32); Managua, Nicaragua
- Occupation: Judoka

Sport
- Country: Nicaragua
- Sport: Judo
- Weight class: +78 kg

Achievements and titles
- Olympic Games: R32 (2020, 2024)
- World Champ.: R16 (2025)
- Pan American Champ.: 7th (2019, 2021)

Profile at external databases
- IJF: 52885
- JudoInside.com: 126813
- Updated on 19 June 2025

Izayana Adelina Marenco Vivas (born 9 October 1992) is a Nicaraguan international level judoka.

In 2021, she competed in the women's +78 kg event at the 2020 Summer Olympics in Tokyo, Japan.

She participated in the 2019 Pan American Judo Championships, and 2021 Pan American Judo Championships.

Olympic Games
| Preceded by Edwin Barberena; Sema Ludrick | Flag bearer for Nicaragua; Paris 2024 with Gerald Hernandez | Succeeded by Incumbent |
