= Sema Ludrick =

Nicaraguan weightlifter

Personal information
- Nationality: Nicaraguan
- Born: 21 December 1999 (age 26) Puerto Cabezas, Nicaragua

Sport
- Sport: Weightlifting
Medal record
Women's weightlifting
Representing Nicaragua
Pan American Championships
Silver medal – second place	2023 Bariloche	64 kg

Sema Nancy Ludrick Rivas is a Nicaraguan weightlifter. She represented Nicaragua at the 2020 Summer Olympics in Tokyo.

She won the silver medal in the women's 64 kg event at the 2023 Pan American Weightlifting Championships held in Bariloche, Argentina. She competed in the women's 71 kg event at the 2023 Pan American Games held in Santiago, Chile.

Olympic Games
Preceded by Rafael Lacayo	Flag bearer for Nicaragua; Tokyo 2020 with Edwin Barberena	Succeeded by Gerald Hernandez; Izayana Marenco
