= Shooting at the 2020 Summer Olympics – Men's 10 metre air pistol =

Olympic shooting event

Men's 10 metre air pistol at the Games of the XXXII Olympiad
- Venue: Asaka Shooting Range
- Dates: 24 July
- Competitors: 36 from 29 nations
- Winning score: 244.8 OR

Medalists
1st place, gold medalist(s)		Javad Foroughi	Iran
2nd place, silver medalist(s)		Damir Mikec	Serbia
3rd place, bronze medalist(s)		Pang Wei	China

The Men's 10 meter air pistol event at the 2020 Summer Olympics took place on 24 July 2021 at the Asaka Shooting Range in Japan.

== Records ==
Prior to this competition, the existing world and Olympic records were as follows.

Qualification records
World record	Jin Jong-oh (KOR)	594	Changwon, Korea	12 April 2009
Olympic record	Mikhail Nestruyev (RUS)	591	Athens, Greece	14 August 2004

Final records
World record	Kim Song-guk (PRK)	246.5	Doha, Qatar	11 November 2019
Olympic record	Not established	—	—	—

== Schedule ==
All times are Japan Standard Time (UTC+9)

Date	Time	Round
Saturday, 24 July 2021	13:00	Qualification
Saturday, 24 July 2021	15:30	Final

== Results ==
=== Qualification ===
Rank	Shooter	Nation	1	2	3	4	5	6	Total	Inner 10s	Notes
1	Saurabh Chaudhary	India	95	98	98	100	98	97	586	28	Q
2	Zhang Bowen	China	98	95	99	98	99	97	586	18	Q
3	Christian Reitz	Germany	97	99	99	95	97	97	584	21	Q
4	Pavlo Korostylov	Ukraine	98	97	97	97	95	97	581	15	Q
5	Javad Foroughi	Iran	98	97	97	97	93	98	580	25	Q
6	Kim Mo-se	South Korea	97	95	95	97	98	97	579	20	Q
7	Pang Wei	China	97	94	98	98	96	95	578	22	Q
8	Damir Mikec	Serbia	98	98	96	94	96	96	578	21	Q
9	Gulfam Joseph	Pakistan	92	98	95	97	98	98	578	13	
10	James Hall	United States	96	95	97	95	96	98	577	23	
11	Artem Chernousov	ROC	96	96	94	99	96	96	577	15	
12	Enkhtaivany Davaakhüü	Mongolia	94	95	95	97	98	98	577	8	
13	Nickolaus Mowrer	United States	96	97	99	97	94	93	576	22	
14	Ye Tun Naung	Myanmar	92	95	98	96	98	97	576	17	
15	Jin Jong-oh	South Korea	95	96	98	93	97	97	576	17	
16	Kojiro Horimizu	Japan	96	97	94	97	98	94	576	13	
17	Abhishek Verma	India	94	96	98	97	98	92	575	19	
18	Oleh Omelchuk	Ukraine	97	95	98	95	95	95	575	14	
19	Jorge Grau Potrille	Cuba	93	100	94	98	96	93	574	16	
20	Ruslan Lunev	Azerbaijan	95	95	98	94	97	95	574	14	
21	Borjan Brankovski	North Macedonia	94	93	98	95	96	95	573	20	
22	Hoàng Xuân Vinh	Vietnam	94	98	97	94	93	97	573	16	
23	Vadim Mukhametyanov	ROC	97	92	96	97	96	95	573	16	
24	Yusuf Dikeç	Turkey	96	95	94	97	96	94	572	19	
25	İsmail Keleş	Turkey	96	94	96	95	95	96	572	17	
26	Paolo Monna	Italy	92	92	97	97	95	97	570	23	
27	Juraj Tužinský	Slovakia	96	95	95	95	94	95	570	14	
28	Ásgeir Sigurgeirsson	Iceland	95	98	91	92	97	97	570	13	
29	Marko Carrillo	Peru	90	91	99	97	96	96	569	14	
30	Daniel Repacholi	Australia	95	93	95	95	94	96	568	15	
31	Samy Abdel Razek	Egypt	97	95	93	95	94	93	567	11	
32	Felipe Wu	Brazil	94	94	94	92	95	97	566	15	
33	Peeter Olesk	Estonia	93	92	96	96	92	95	564	8	
34	Ala Al-Othmani	Tunisia	93	94	97	93	92	94	563	16	
35	Philip Elhage	Aruba	93	94	94	92	94	89	556	6	
36	Edwin Barberena	Nicaragua	96	90	93	92	93	90	554	10	

=== Final ===
Rank	Shooter	Nation	1	2	3	4	5	6	7	8	9	Total	Notes
1st place, gold medalist(s)	Javad Foroughi	Iran	50.7	101.0	121.2	142.2	163.3	184.0	204.2	224.2	244.8	244.8	OR
2nd place, silver medalist(s)	Damir Mikec	Serbia	48.7	98.7	119.3	138.0	158.6	179.3	199.6	220.0	237.9	237.9	
3rd place, bronze medalist(s)	Pang Wei	China	49.1	99.7	119.5	139.6	160.5	180.0	199.4	217.6	—	217.6	
4	Pavlo Korostylov	Ukraine	48.4	99.2	119.6	139.4	160.4	180.3	198.9	—		198.9	
5	Christian Reitz	Germany	49.5	97.1	117.6	137.8	158.2	176.6	—			176.6	
6	Zhang Bowen	China	48.9	98.2	116.8	137.7	158.2	—				158.2	
7	Saurabh Chaudhary	India	47.7	96.8	117.2	137.4	—					137.4	
8	Kim Mo-se	South Korea	50.0	96.7	115.8	—						115.8	
