= Evidelia González =

Nicaraguan rower (born 1997)

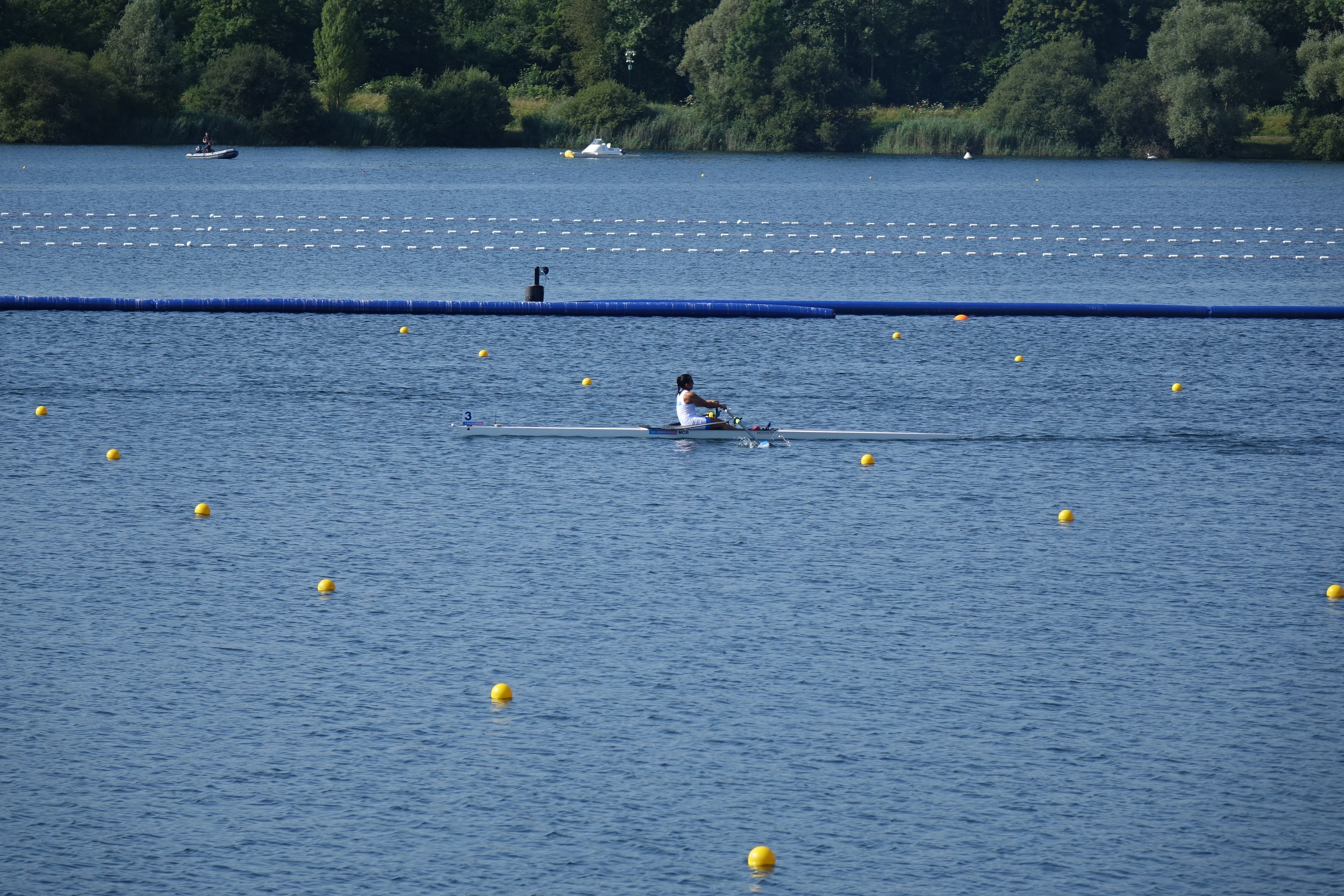
- 2024 Summer Olympics

Personal information
- Full name: Evidelia González Jarquin
- Nationality: Nicaragua
- Born: 20 November 1997 (age 28)

Sport
- Sport: Rowing

Evidelia González Jarquin (born 20 November 1997) is a Nicaraguan rower. She competed in the 2020 Summer Olympics. She was one of the eight athletes who represented Nicaragua in these games, as well as the first Nicaraguan woman to compete in the rowing discipline. In 2018, Ana Vanegas and Evidelia González won bronze in the double scull competition at the Central American and Caribbean Games in Barranquilla, Colombia. In 2017 she won the gold medal in the rowing competition at the Central American Games in Managua (2017).
