= Nicaraguan Olympic Committee =

National Olympic Committee for Nicaragua

- Country: Nicaragua
- [[|]]
- Code: NCA
- Created: 1959
- Recognized: 1959
- Continental Association: PASO
- Headquarters: Managua, Nicaragua
- President: Emmett Lang Salmerón
- Secretary General: Juan Santiago Estrada García
- Website: www.con.org.ni

The Nicaraguan Olympic Committee (Spanish: Comité Olímpico Nicaragüense) (IOC Code: NCA) is the National Olympic Committee representing Nicaragua at the Olympics. It is also the body responsible for Nicaragua representation at the Olympic Games.

== History ==
The Nicaraguan Olympic Committee was founded in 1959 and recognised by the International Olympic Committee in the same year.

== See also ==
- Nicaragua at the Olympics
