= Mexico at the 1992 Summer Olympics =

- IOC code: MEX
- NOC: Mexican Olympic Committee
- Website: www.soycom.org (in Spanish)

in Barcelona
- Competitors: 102 (76 men and 26 women) in 18 sports
- Flag bearer: Jesús Mena
- Medals Ranked 49th: Gold 0 Silver 1 Bronze 0 Total 1

Summer Olympics appearances (overview)
- 1900; 1904–1920; 1924; 1928; 1932; 1936; 1948; 1952; 1956; 1960; 1964; 1968; 1972; 1976; 1980; 1984; 1988; 1992; 1996; 2000; 2004; 2008; 2012; 2016; 2020; 2024; 2028

Mexico competed at the 1992 Summer Olympics in Barcelona, Spain. The country sent 102 athletes (76 men and 26 women) and competed in 71 events in 18 sports.

== Medalists ==
Medal	Name	Sport	Event	Date
Silver	Carlos Mercenario	Athletics	Men's 50 kilometres walk	7 August

== Competitors ==
The following is the list of number of competitors in the Games.

Sport	Men	Women	Total
Archery	3	1	4
Athletics	18	6	24
Boxing	4	–	4
Canoeing	4	0	4
Cycling	5	0	5
Diving	4	4	8
Equestrian	6	0	6
Football	16	–	16
Gymnastics	1	1	2
Judo	1	0	1
Modern pentathlon	3	–	3
Rowing	3	2	5
Sailing	1	2	3
Shooting	1	0	1
Swimming	2	5	7
Synchronized swimming	–	3	3
Tennis	2	2	4
Wrestling	2	–	2
Total	76	26	102

== Archery ==
In its fourth Olympic archery competition, Mexico entered three men and one woman. Only one of the individuals advanced to the elimination rounds, where he was defeated in the first match. The men's team missed the team round by one ranking. They were 4 points behind the 16th place team.

Women's Individual Competition:

- Aurora Breton — Ranking round, 45th place (0-0)

Men's Individual Competition:

- José Anchondo — Round of 32, 31st place (0-1)
- Ricardo Rojas — Ranking round, 37th place (0-0)
- Omar Bustani — Ranking round, 67th place (0-0)

Men's Team Competition:

- Anchondo, Rojas, and Bustani — Ranking round, 17th place (0-0)

== Athletics ==
Men's 5,000 metres

- Ignacio Fragoso — 14.16,14 (→ 42nd place)

Men's 10,000 metres

- Arturo Barrios

- Heat — 28:28.26
- Final — 28:17.79 (→ 5th place)

- Germán Silva

- Heat — 28:13.72
- Final — 28:20.19 (→ 6th place)

- Armando Quintanilla

- Heat — 28:23.76
- Final — 28:48.05(→ 16th place)

Men's Marathon

- Isidro Rico — 2:18.52 (→ 29th place)
- Dionicio Cerón — did not finish (→ no ranking)

Men's 4 × 100 m Relay

- Genaro Rojas, Eduardo Nava, Raymundo Escalante, Herman Adam and Alejandro Cárdenas

Men's 4 × 400 m Relay

- Raymundo Escalante, Eduardo Nava, Luis Karin Toledo, and Juan Vallin Gutierrez

- Heat — 3:05.75 (→ did not advance)

Men's 20 km Walk

- Daniel Garcia — 1:25:35 (→ 7th place)
- Joel Sánchez — 1:30:12 (→ 21st place)
- Ernesto Canto — 1:33:51 (→ 29th place)

Men's 50 km Walk

- Carlos Mercenario — 3:52:09 (→ Silver Medal)
- Miguel Rodríguez — 3:58:26 (→ 8th place)
- Germán Sánchez — DSQ (→ no ranking)

Women's 10,000 metres

- María Luisa Servín

- Heat — 33:42.74 (→ did not advance)

Women's Marathon

- Olga Appell — did not finish (→ no ranking)

Women's 10 km Walk

- Maricela Chávez

- Final — 48:39 (→ 28th place)

- Eva Machuca

- Final — 50:02 (→ 30th place)

- Graciela Mendoza

- Final — DSQ (→ no ranking)

Women's High Jump

- Cristina Fink

- Qualification — 1.83 m (→ did not advance)

== Boxing ==
Men's Flyweight (— 51 kg)

- Narciso González

- First Round — Lost to Benjamin Mwangata (TAN), RSCH-3 (01:43)

Men's Bantamweight (— 54 kg)

- Javier Calderón

- First Round — Defeated Benjamin Ngaruiya (KEN), 16:4
- Second Round — Lost to Remigio Molina (ARG), 4:5

Men's Light-Welterweight (– 63.5 kg)

- Edgar Ruiz

- First Round — Lost to Leonard Doroftei (ROM), 4:24

Men's Light-Heavyweight (– 81 kg)

- Manuel Verde

- First Round — Lost to Patrice Aouissi (FRA), RSCH-3 (01:46)

== Cycling ==
Five male cyclists represented Mexico in 1992.

Men's 1 km time trial

- César Muciño

Men's team pursuit

- Arturo García
- César Muciño
- Jesús Vázquez
- Marco Zaragoza

Men's points race

- Manuel Youshimatz

== Diving ==
Men's 3m Springboard

- Jorge Mondragón

- Preliminary Round — 384.45 points
- Final — 604.14 points (→ 6th place)

- Fernando Platas

- Preliminary Round — 355.47 points (→ did not advance, 17th place)

Men's 10m Platform

- Alberto Acosta

- Preliminary Round — 398.55 points
- Final — 482.28 points (→ 11th place)

- Jesús Mena

- Preliminary Round — 370.47 (→ did not advance, 15th place)

Women's 3m Springboard

- María Elena Romero

- Preliminary Round — 269.34 (→ did not advance, 16th place)

- Ana Ayala

- Preliminary Round — 249.03 (→ did not advance, 25th place)

Women's 10m Platform

- María Alcalá

- Final — 394.35 points (→ 6th place)

- Macarena Alexanderson

- Preliminary Round — 286.59 points (→ 13th place)

== Football ==
=== Men's team competition ===
- Preliminary round (group D)

- Drew with Denmark (1-1)
- Drew with Australia (1-1)
- Drew with Ghana (1-1) → did not advance

- Team roster

- ( 1.) José Alberto Guadarrama
- ( 2.) Ricardo Cadena
- ( 3.) Manuel Vidrio
- ( 4.) Alberto Macías
- ( 5.) Silviano Delgado
- ( 6.) Joaquín Hernández
- ( 7.) José Agustín Morales
- ( 8.) David Rangel
- ( 9.) Francisco Rotllán
- (10.) Jorge Castañeda
- (11.) Damián Álvarez
- (12.) Miguel Fuentes
- (13.) Camilo Romero
- (14.) Carlos López
- (15.) José Eduardo Pavez
- (16.) Mario Arteaga
- (17.) Pedro Pineda
- (18.) Ángel Lemus
- (19.) Ignacio Vázquez
- (20.) Ángel Maldonado

- Head coach: Óscar Iparraguirre

== Modern pentathlon ==
Three male pentathletes represented Mexico in 1992.

Individual

- Iván Ortega
- Alejandro Yrizar
- Alberto Félix

Team

- Iván Ortega
- Alejandro Yrizar
- Alberto Félix

== Sailing ==
Women's 470 Class

- Margarita Pazos and Karla Gutiérrez

- Final Ranking — 126 points (→ 17th place)

== Swimming ==
Men's 50m Freestyle

- Rodrigo González

- Heat — 23.52 (→ did not advance, 27th place)

Men's 100m Freestyle

- Rodrigo González

- Heat — 51.04 (→ did not advance, 22nd place)

Men's 100m Breaststroke

- Javier Careaga

- Heat — 1:03.45 (→ did not advance, 20th place)

Men's 200m Breaststroke

- Javier Careaga

- Heat — 2:15.59
- B-Final — 2:16.55 (→ did not advance, 15th place)

Women's 400m Freestyle

- Laura Sánchez

- Heat — 4:23.87 (→ did not advance, 23rd place)

- Erika González

- Heat — 4:32.06 (→ did not advance, 29th place)

Women's 800m Freestyle

- Laura Sánchez

- Heat — 9:10.31 (→ did not advance, 21st place)

- Erika González

- Heat — 9:17.18 (→ did not advance, 25th place)

Women's 100m Butterfly

- Gabriela Gaja

- Heat — 1:04.84 (→ did not advance, 40th place)

Women's 4 × 100 m Medley Relay

- Heike Koerner, Ana Mendoza, Gabriela Gaja, and Laura Sánchez

- Heat — 4:26.73 (→ did not advance, 17th place)

== Synchronized Swimming ==
Three synchronized swimmers represented Mexico in 1992.

Women's solo

- Sonia Cárdeñas
- Elizabeth Cervantes
- Lourdes Olivera

Women's duet

- Sonia Cárdeñas
- Lourdes Olivera

== Tennis ==
Men's Singles Competition

- Francisco Maciel

- First round — Lost to Jakob Hlasek (Switzerland) 3-6, 4-6, 6-4, 2-6

- Leonardo Lavalle

- First round — Defeated Jan Siemerink (Netherlands) 6-4, 6-4, 6-2
- Second round — Defeated Henri Leconte (France) 6-4, 3-6, 4-6, 6-3, 10-8
- Third round — Defeated Carl-Uwe Steeb (Germany) 6-4, 3-6, 6-3, 6-2
- Quarterfinals — Lost to Jordi Arrese (Spain) 1-6, 6-7, 1-6

Men's Doubles Competition

- Leonardo Lavalle and Francisco Maciel

- First round — Lost to Owen Casey and Eoin Collins (Ireland) 6-7, 4-6, retired

Women's Singles Competition

- Lupita Novelo

- First Round — Lost to Steffi Graf (Germany) 1-6 1-6

== See also ==
- Mexico at the 1991 Pan American Games
