= Swimming at the 1991 Pan American Games – Women's 200 metre backstroke =

Women's 200 metre backstroke at the 1991 Pan American Games
- Venue: -
- Dates: August 18 (preliminaries and finals)
- Competitors: from - nations

Medalists
Gold medal	Diana Trimble	United States
Silver medal	Nikki Dryden	Canada
Bronze medal	Joanne Malar	Canada

The women's 200 metre backstroke competition of the swimming events at the 1991 Pan American Games took place on 18 August. The last Pan American Games champion was Katie Welch of US.

This race consisted of four lengths of the pool, all in backstroke.

== Results ==
All times are in minutes and seconds.

KEY:	q	Fastest non-qualifiers	Q	Qualified	GR	Games record	NR	National record	PB	Personal best	SB	Seasonal best

=== Final ===
The final was held on August 18.

Rank	Name	Nationality	Time	Notes
1st place, gold medalist(s)	Diana Trimble	United States	2:15.80	
2nd place, silver medalist(s)	Nikki Dryden	Canada	2:16.13	
3rd place, bronze medalist(s)	Joanne Malar	Canada	2:16.36	
4	Kristy Heydanek	United States	2:16.61	
5	Rita Garay	Puerto Rico	2:17.82	
6	Veronica Meinhard	Venezuela	2:19.84	
7	Heike Koerner	Mexico	2:22.73	
8	Cristiane Santos	Brazil	2:24.10	
