= Synchronized swimming at the 1991 Pan American Games =

- No. of events: 3

Synchronized swimming at the 1991 Pan American Games was held from August 2 to August 18, 1991 in Havana, Cuba. There were three medal events.

== Medal table ==
Rank	Nation	Gold	Silver	Bronze	Total
1	United States	3	0	0	3
2	Canada	0	1	1	2
2	Mexico	0	1	1	2
4	Venezuela	0	1	0	1
5	Cuba	0	0	1	1
Totals (5 entries)		3	3	3	9

== Medalists ==
Event	Gold		Silver		Bronze	
Solo	Becky Dyroen; United States	181.372	María Elena Giusti; Venezuela	180.022	Sonia Cárdeñas; Mexico	176.625
Duet	United States (USA); Tia Harding; Diana Ulrich	177.994	Mexico (MEX); Sonia Cárdeñas; Lourdes Olivera	174.936	Canada (CAN); Julie Bibby; Corinne Keddie	174.452
Team	United States (USA); Tia Harding; Laurie Martin; Anna Miller; Kim Ochsner; Emily Porter; Diana Ulrich; Janet Wiecking; Mary Wodka; Keri Kreitzer; Khadija Cutcher	177.646	Canada (CAN)	176.407	Cuba (CUB)	171.775
