= Swimming at the 1991 Pan American Games – Women's 200 metre individual medley =

Women's 200 metre individual medley at the 1991 Pan American Games
- Venue: -
- Dates: August 17 (preliminaries and finals)
- Competitors: from - nations

Medalists
| Gold medal | Lisa Summers | United States |
| Silver medal | Joanne Malar | Canada |
| Bronze medal | Jennifer Toton | United States |

The women's 200 metre individual medley competition of the swimming events at the 1991 Pan American Games took place on 17 August. The last Pan American Games champion was Susan Habermas of US.

This race consisted of four lengths of the pool, one each in backstroke, breaststroke, butterfly and freestyle swimming.

== Results ==
All times are in minutes and seconds.

| KEY: | q | Fastest non-qualifiers | Q | Qualified | GR | Games record | NR | National record | PB | Personal best | SB | Seasonal best |

=== Final ===
The final was held on August 17.

| Rank | Name | Nationality | Time | Notes |
|---|---|---|---|---|
| 1st place, gold medalist(s) | Lisa Summers | United States | 2:16.86 | |
| 2nd place, silver medalist(s) | Joanne Malar | Canada | 2:19.14 | |
| 3rd place, bronze medalist(s) | Jennifer Toton | United States | 2:19.56 | |
| 4 | Sheila Hewerdine | Canada | 2:21.32 | |
| 5 | Veronica Meinhard | Venezuela | 2:22.32 | |
| 6 | Fernanda Ferraz | Brazil | 2:23.00 | |
| 7 | Sonia Alvarez | Puerto Rico | 2:25.02 | |
| 8 | Laura Sánchez | Mexico | 2:25.25 | |
