= Taekwondo at the 1991 Pan American Games =

The competition for Taekwondo at the 1991 Pan American Games took place from August 14 - August 17, 1991 in Havana, Cuba. This was the sport's second appearance at the Pan American Games, after its debut at the 1987 Games.

== Medal table ==
* Host nation (Cuba)

Rank	Nation	Gold	Silver	Bronze	Total
1	Cuba*	3	2	1	6
2	Venezuela	2	0	2	4
3	United States	1	2	0	3
4	Brazil	1	1	1	3
4	Canada	1	1	1	3
6	Mexico	0	1	2	3
7	Bolivia	0	1	0	1
8	Colombia	0	0	3	3
9	Argentina	0	0	2	2
10	Chile	0	0	1	1
10	Guatemala	0	0	1	1
10	Peru	0	0	1	1
10	U.S. Virgin Islands (VIR)	0	0	1	1
Totals (13 entries)		8	8	16	32

== Men's events ==
Event	Gold	Silver	Bronze
50 kg	Juan Moreno; United States	Amauris Batista; Cuba	César Galvão; Brazil
50 kg	Juan Moreno; United States	Amauris Batista; Cuba	José Morales; Colombia
54 kg	Arlindo Gouveia; Venezuela	Agustín Ayala; Mexico	Luis Flores; Peru
54 kg	Arlindo Gouveia; Venezuela	Agustín Ayala; Mexico	Diego Yáñez; Chile
58 kg	Carlos Rivas; Venezuela	Marcial Basanta; Cuba	Flavio Salvador; Argentina
58 kg	Carlos Rivas; Venezuela	Marcial Basanta; Cuba	Rafael Zúñiga; Mexico
64 kg	Roberto Abreu; Cuba	Stephan Goodwin; Canada	Gerardo González; Venezuela
64 kg	Roberto Abreu; Cuba	Stephan Goodwin; Canada	Fernando Oviedo; Colombia
70 kg	Ilse Guilarte; Cuba	William Arancibia; Bolivia	Víctor Estrada; Mexico
70 kg	Ilse Guilarte; Cuba	William Arancibia; Bolivia	Michael Popovich; Canada
76 kg	Jae Hoon Lee; Canada	James Vilasana; United States	Juan Noa; Cuba
76 kg	Jae Hoon Lee; Canada	James Vilasana; United States	Marco Prado; Guatemala
83 kg	Fabio Goulart; Brazil	Herbert Perez; United States	Jorge Kahkajian; Venezuela
83 kg	Fabio Goulart; Brazil	Herbert Perez; United States	Henry Ramírez; Colombia
+ 83 kg	Nelson Sáenz; Cuba	Lúcio Freitas; Brazil	Robert Fellner; Virgin Islands
+ 83 kg	Nelson Sáenz; Cuba	Lúcio Freitas; Brazil	Ricardo Pupo; Argentina
