= Mexico at the 1991 Pan American Games =

- IOC code: MEX
- NOC: Comité Olímpico Mexicano (in Spanish)

in Havana 8–18 August 1991
- Medals Ranked 5th: Gold 14 Silver 23 Bronze 38 Total 75

Pan American Games appearances (overview)
- 1951; 1955; 1959; 1963; 1967; 1971; 1975; 1979; 1983; 1987; 1991; 1995; 1999; 2003; 2007; 2011; 2015; 2019; 2023; 2027

The 11th Pan American Games were held in Havana, Cuba from August 2 to August 18, 1991.

== Medals ==
=== Gold ===
===== Athletics =====
1. Men's 5000 metres - Arturo Barrios
2. Men's 10000 metres - Martín Pitayo
3. Men's 50 kilometre road walk - Carlos Mercenario
4. Women's 10000 metres - María del Carmen Díaz
5. Women's Marathon - Olga Appell
6. Women's 50 kilometre road walk - Graciela Mendoza

===== Bowling =====
1. Women's Masters - Edda Piccini

===== Judo =====
1. Men's Lightweight - Mario González

===== Rowing =====
1. Men's Single sculls - Joaquín Gómez
2. Men's Lightweight Single sculls - Miguel García
3. Men's Lightweight Coxless Pairs - Mexico
4. Women's Double sculls - Mexico

===== Shooting =====
1. Men's Team 10 metre air pistol - Mexico

===== Tennis =====
1. Men's singles - Luis-Enrique Herrera

=== Silver ===
===== Archery =====
1. Men's Recurve Team
2. Women's Recurve Team

===== Athletics =====
1. Men's 5000 metres - Ignacio Fragoso
2. Men's 20 kilometre road walk - Joel Sánchez Guerrero
3. Men's 50 kilometre road walk - Miguel Ángel Rodríguez
4. Women's 3000 metres - María del Carmen Díaz

===== Boxing =====
1. Men's Light Flyweight - Ricardo Sánchez López
2. Men's Light Welterweight - Edgar Ruiz

===== Canoeing =====
1. Men's C-2 500 metres - Mexico
2. Men's C-2 1000 metres - Mexico

===== Diving =====
1. Men's 10m Platform - Jesús Mena

===== Fencing =====
1. Women's Individual épée - Angélica Dueñas

===== Football =====
1. Men's Team - Mexico

===== Gymnastics =====
1. Men's Horizontal Bar - Luis López

===== Rowing =====
1. Women's Single sculls - Martha García
2. Women's Lightweight Single sculls - María Montoya

===== Sailing =====
1. Women's 470 - Mexico

===== Synchronized swimming =====
1. Women's Duet - Sonia Cárdeñas & Lourdes Olivera

===== Taekwondo =====
1. Men's 54 kg - Agustín Ayala

===== Tennis =====
1. Men's Doubles - Mexico

===== Wrestling =====
1. Men's Freestyle (52 kg) - Bernardo Olvera
2. Men's Freestyle (74 kg) - Felipe Guzman

=== Bronze ===
===== Archery =====
1. Men's Recurve: Ricardo Rojas
2. Men's Recurve 30 m: Ricardo Rojas
3. Men's Recurve 50 m: Ricardo Rojas
4. Men's Recurve 70 m: Eduardo Messmacher
5. Men's Recurve 90 m: Ricardo Rojas
6. Women's Recurve: Aurora Bretón
7. Women's Recurve 30 m: Aurora Bretón
8. Women's Recurve 50 m: Miriam Véliz
9. Women's Recurve 60 m: Alejandra Garcia
10. Women's Recurve 70 m: Aurora Bretón

===== Athletics =====
1. Women's 10000 metres - María Luisa Servín
2. Women's 10000 metre track walk - Maricela Chávez

===== Bowling =====
1. Men's Team - Alfonso Rodríguez, Daniel Falconi, Luis Javier Iserte, Roberto Silva
2. Women's Team - Edda Piccini, Ana Maria Avila, Leticia Rosas, Celia Flores

===== Boxing =====
1. Men's Bantamweight - Javier Calderón
2. Men's Featherweight - Arnulfo Castillo
3. Men's Welterweight - Santos Beltrán

===== Canoeing =====
1. Men's C-1 500 metres - José Ferrer

===== Diving =====
1. Men's 1m Springboard - Jorge Mondragon
2. Men's 3m Springboard - Jorge Mondragon

===== Equestrian =====
1. Team dressage - Mexico

===== Fencing =====
1. Women's individual épée - Yolitzin Martínez
2. Women's team épée - Mexico

===== Gymnastics =====
1. Men's Parallel Bars - Luis López
2. Men's Parallel Bars - Alejandro Peniche
3. Men's Vault - Alejandro Peniche
4. Men's Team - Mexico

===== Rowing =====
1. Men's Quadruple sculls - Mexico
2. Men's Lightweight quadruple sculls - Mexico
3. Women's Quadruple sculls - Mexico

===== Sailing =====
1. Men's Finn - Erick Mergenthaler

===== Swimming =====
1. Men's 100m freestyle: Rodrigo González
2. Women's 4×100m Medley Relay: Heike Koerner, Monique Piñon, Gabriela Gaja, Laura Sánchez
3. Women's 4×200m Freestyle Relay: Lorenza Muñoz, Maria S.Rivera, Heike Koerner, Laura Sánchez

===== Synchronized swimming =====
1. Women's Solo - Sonia Cárdeñas

===== Taekwondo =====
1. Men's 58 kg - Rafael Zúñiga
2. Men's 70 kg - Víctor Estrada

===== Tennis =====
1. Men's Doubles - Mexico
2. Women's Doubles - Mexico

===== Wrestling =====
1. Men's Greco-Roman (68 kg) - Juan Mora

== See also ==
- Mexico at the 1990 Central American and Caribbean Games
- Mexico at the 1992 Summer Olympics
