= Judo at the 1991 Pan American Games =

Judo Judo at the 1991 Pan American Games
- Location: Havana, Cuba
- Dates: 8–11 August 1991

Competition at external databases
- Links: JudoInside

This page shows the results of the Judo Competition for men and women at the 1991 Pan American Games, held from August 2 to August 18, 1991 in Havana, Cuba. There were nine weight divisions, for both men and women.

== Medal table ==
Place	Nation	Gold medal	Silver medal	Bronze medal	Total
1	Cuba	11	1	5	17
2	United States	3	6	6	15
3	Brazil	1	2	7	10
4	Argentina	1	2	4	7
5	Puerto Rico	1	2	2	5
6	Mexico	1	0	0	1
7	Canada	0	2	4	6
8	Dominican Republic	0	2	1	3
9	Ecuador	0	1	0	1
10	Venezuela	0	0	6	6
11	Haiti	0	0	1	1
Total		18	18	36	72

== Men's competition ==
=== Men's Flyweight (– 56 kg) ===
RANK	NAME JUDOKA
Gold medal	Luis Martinez (PUR)
Silver medal	Clifton Sunada (USA)
Bronze medal	Willis García (VEN)
Bronze medal	Sumio Tsujimoto (BRA)

=== Men's Bantamweight (– 60 kg) ===
RANK	NAME JUDOKA
Gold medal	Shigueto Yamasaki (BRA)
Silver medal	Ewan Beaton (CAN)
Bronze medal	Israel Hernández (CUB)
Bronze medal	Edward Liddie (USA)

=== Men's Featherweight (– 65 kg) ===
RANK	NAME JUDOKA
Gold medal	Francisco Morales (ARG)
Silver medal	Jean-Pierre Cantin (CAN)
Bronze medal	Pablo Hernández (CUB)
Bronze medal	Jimmy Pedro (USA)

=== Men's Lightweight (– 71 kg) ===
RANK	NAME JUDOKA
Gold medal	Mario González (MEX)
Silver medal	Sergio Oliveira (BRA)
Bronze medal	Ismael Borbona (CUB)
Bronze medal	Dan Hatano (USA)

=== Men's Light Middleweight (– 78 kg) ===
RANK	NAME JUDOKA
Gold medal	Jason Morris (USA)
Silver medal	Armando Maldonado (CUB)
Bronze medal	Renato Dagnino (BRA)
Bronze medal	Gastón García (ARG)

=== Men's Middleweight (– 86 kg) ===
RANK	NAME JUDOKA
Gold medal	Joseph Wanag (USA)
Silver medal	José Vera (DOM)
Bronze medal	Andrés Franco (CUB)
Bronze medal	Hermate Souffrant (HAI)

=== Men's Light Heavyweight (– 95 kg) ===
RANK	NAME JUDOKA
Gold medal	Belarmino Salgado (CUB)
Silver medal	Leo White (USA)
Bronze medal	Jorge Aguirre (ARG)
Bronze medal	Charles Griffith (VEN)

=== Men's Heavyweight (+ 95 kg) ===
RANK	NAME JUDOKA
Gold medal	Frank Moreno (CUB)
Silver medal	Orlando Baccino (ARG)
Bronze medal	James Bacon (USA)
Bronze medal	Frederico Flexa (BRA)

=== Men's Open ===
RANK	NAME JUDOKA
Gold medal	Jorge Fis (CUB)
Silver medal	Christophe Leininger (USA)
Bronze medal	Orlando Baccino (ARG)
Bronze medal	Charles Griffith (VEN)

== Women's competition ==
=== Women's Flyweight (– 45 kg) ===
RANK	NAME JUDOKA
Gold medal	Mabel Fonseca (CUB)
Silver medal	Cathy Lee (USA)
Bronze medal	Cristina Souza (BRA)
Bronze medal	María Villapol (VEN)

=== Women's Extra Lightweight (– 48 kg) ===
RANK	NAME JUDOKA
Gold medal	Legna Verdecia (CUB)
Silver medal	Valerie Lafon (USA)
Bronze medal	Mônica Angelucci (BRA)
Bronze medal	Brigitte Lastrade (CAN)

=== Women's Half Lightweight (– 52 kg) ===
RANK	NAME JUDOKA
Gold medal	Maritza Pérez (CUB)
Silver medal	Patricia Bevilacqua (BRA)
Bronze medal	Lisa Boscarino (PUR)
Bronze medal	Carolina Mariani (ARG)

=== Women's Lightweight (– 56 kg) ===
RANK	NAME JUDOKA
Gold medal	Kate Donahoo (USA)
Silver medal	Altagracia Contreras (DOM)
Bronze medal	Kenia Rodríguez (CUB)
Bronze medal	Maniliz Segarra (PUR)

=== Women's Half Middleweight (– 61 kg) ===
RANK	NAME JUDOKA
Gold medal	Ileana Beltrán (CUB)
Silver medal	Lynn Roethke (USA)
Bronze medal	Xiomara Griffith (VEN)
Bronze medal	Eleucadia Vargas (DOM)

=== Women's Middleweight (– 66 kg) ===
RANK	NAME JUDOKA
Gold medal	Odalis Revé (CUB)
Silver medal	Laura Martinel (ARG)
Bronze medal	Francis Gómez (VEN)
Bronze medal	Liliko Ogasawara (USA)

=== Women's Half Heavyweight (– 72 kg) ===
RANK	NAME JUDOKA
Gold medal	Niurka Moreno (CUB)
Silver medal	María Cangá (ECU)
Bronze medal	Tammy Hensley (USA)
Bronze medal	Alison Webb (CAN)

=== Women's Heavyweight (+ 72 kg) ===
RANK	NAME JUDOKA
Gold medal	Estela Rodríguez (CUB)
Silver medal	Nilmaris Santini (PUR)
Bronze medal	Edilene Aparecida (BRA)
Bronze medal	Jane Patterson (CAN)

=== Women's Open ===
RANK	NAME JUDOKA
Gold medal	Estela Rodríguez (CUB)
Silver medal	Nilmaris Santini (PUR)
Bronze medal	Soraia André (BRA)
Bronze medal	Jane Patterson (CAN)
