= Bowling at the 1991 Pan American Games =

This page shows the results of the Bowling Competition for men and women at the 1991 Pan American Games, held from August 2 to August 18, 1991 in Havana, Cuba. The event was included for the first time at the Pan American Games.

Having been held at the Games as a demonstration sport in 1983, the sport was given full status by the Pan American Sports Organization Council in 1986. The 1991 edition represented the first time that athletes' performances counted towards the Pan American Games medal table.

== Men's competition ==
=== Masters ===
RANK	FINAL	AVERAGE
Gold medal	Patrick Healey (USA)	—
Silver medal	Luis Serfaty (VEN)	—
Bronze medal	Jon Juneau (USA)	—
4.	Ray Vervynck (CAN)	—

=== Teams ===
RANK	FINAL	AVERAGE
Gold medal	United States • Steve Kloempken • Ralph Solan • Jon Juneau • Patrick Healey Jr.	7,442
Silver medal	Venezuela • Pedro Carreyo • Pedro Elias Cardozo • Luis Serfaty • Francisco Carabano	7,007
Bronze medal	Mexico • Alfonso Rodríguez • Daniel Falconi • Luis Javier Iserte • Roberto Silva	6,989

== Women's competition ==
=== Masters ===
RANK	FINAL	AVERAGE
Gold medal	Edda Piccini (MEX)	—
Silver medal	Julie Gardner (USA)	—
Bronze medal	Mandy Wilson (USA)	—
4.	Mari Ortíz (PUR)	—

=== Teams ===
RANK	FINAL	AVERAGE
Gold medal	United States • Maureen Webb • Julie Gardner • Mandy Wilson • Lynda Norry	6,733
Silver medal	Venezuela • Mirella Trasolini • Gisela Sánchez • Mariela Alarza • Gabriela Bigai	6,687
Bronze medal	Mexico • Edda Piccini • Ana Maria Avila • Leticia Rosas • Celia Flores	6,627

== Medal table ==
Place	Nation	Gold medal	Silver medal	Bronze medal	Total
1	United States	3	1	2	6
2	Mexico	1	0	2	3
3	Venezuela	0	3	0	3
Total		4	4	4	12
