= Mark Warburton (gymnast) =

American artistic gymnast

- Born: March 22, 1968 (age 58) Burlington, Vermont, U.S.

Gymnastics career
- Discipline: Men's artistic gymnastics
- Country represented: United States; (1988–1993)
- College team: Nebraska Cornhuskers
- Gym: Stony Hill Gymnastics Club
- Head coach: Francis Allen
- Former coaches: Mike McCarthy; Bob Abbott
Medal record
Men's artistic gymnastics
Representing United States
Event	1st	2nd	3rd
Pan American Games	0	1	0
Total	0	1	0
Pan American Games
Silver medal – second place	1991 Havana	Team

Mark Warburton (born March 22, 1968) is a retired American artistic gymnast. He was a member of the United States men's national artistic gymnastics team and won a silver medal at the 1991 Pan American Games.

== Early life and education ==
Warburton was born on March 22, 1968, in Burlington, Vermont, to Georgia C. and R. King Warburton. He was raised in Dunbarton, New Hampshire. His sister participated in gymnastics and Warburton followed her lead while in grade school. He trained under coach Bob Abbott for 4 years and followed the coach to different clubs to stay together. While in high school, he decided to switch gyms to Massachusetts' Stony Hill Gymnastics Club under coach Mike McCarthy.

Warburton attended Goffstown High School for his freshman and sophomore years before transferring to Wilbraham & Monson Academy and graduating in 1986. A winner of a Harvard Book Award, Warburton was recruited by University of Wisconsin–Madison, University of Iowa, and University of Minnesota before enrolling at University of Nebraska–Lincoln to pursue gymnastics.

== Gymnastics career ==
While a student at Nebraska, Warburton was an Nebraska Cornhuskers men's gymnastics team member. He competed from 1987 to 1990 and finished as one of the most accomplished gymnasts in program history with 20 combined individual titles. He was a member of Nebraska's 1990 NCAA men's gymnastics championship winning team.

At the 1988 U.S. National Gymnastics Championships, Warburton finished first all-around for the 1992 Olympic candidate grouping and was named to the United States senior elite development team. Following a seventh-place all-around placement at the 1988 Winter Nationals, Warburton was named to the United States men's national artistic gymnastics team for the first time. He participated in the 1988 Kraft International in London, England.

Warburton placed sixth in the all-around at the 1990 U.S. National Gymnastics Championships with third-place finishes on the pommel horse and still rings. The following month, he was third in the all-around and first on the pommel horse at the 1990 U.S. Olympic Festival in July 1990.

In 1991, Warburton placed ninth in the all-around at the 1991 U.S. National Gymnastics Championships with a fourth-place finish on still rings. He was chosen to represent the United States at the 1991 Pan American Games later that summer. He received a silver medal as the team placed second in the team all-around.

In 1992, Warburton repeated his ninth-place finish at the 1992 U.S. National Gymnastics Championships and finished third on the parallel bars. He participated in the 1992 United States Olympic trials, but was not selected as a member of the 1992 Summer Olympics team.
