= Jeff Lutz =

American artistic gymnast

- Born: 1967 or 1968 (age 58–59)
- Height: 5 ft 5 in (165 cm)

Gymnastics career
- Discipline: Men's artistic gymnastics
- Country represented: United States
- College team: Oklahoma Sooners
- Head coach: Greg Buwick
- Retired: 1994
Medal record
Men's artistic gymnastics
Representing United States
Event	1st	2nd	3rd
Pan American Games	0	1	0
Total	0	1	0
Pan American Games
Silver medal – second place	1991 Havana	Team

Jeff Lutz is a retired American artistic gymnast. He was a member of the United States men's national artistic gymnastics team and won a silver medal at the 1991 Pan American Games.

== Early life and education ==
Lutz called Fort Worth, Texas home and competed in gymnastics at an early age for Gyros. He attended Richland High School in nearby North Richland Hills. He competed for the school's gymnastics team for one season as a sophomore and led the team to the Texas state title. He quit high school gymnastics when he was selected for the junior national gymnastics team and to train more difficult compulsory routines. He was considered one of the best youth gymnasts in the nation and after he graduated from Richland in 1986, he enrolled at the University of Oklahoma to pursue gymnastics.

== Gymnastics career ==
While a student at Oklahoma, Lutz was an Oklahoma Sooners men's gymnastics team member. He competed on the team for the 1987, 1988, and 1991 teams culminating in winning the 1991 NCAA Men's Gymnastics Championships. He graduated from Oklahoma in 1992 with a political science degree.

In 1991, Lutz was chosen to represent the United States at the 1991 Pan American Games. He received a silver medal as the team placed second in the team all-around.

Lutz retired in 1992 for around one year before returning to gymnastics competition in October 1993. He retired from competition in 1994.

== Later career ==
After his competitive career, Lutz stayed involved with gymnastics. He opened Gym Express, a gymnastics facility that was located in Auburn, Washington, in 1997. It remained under their control until they sold the gym in 2007. They then purchased PSSG in 2007, renamed it Puget Sound Gymnastics, and later sold it in 2010.

In June 2005, Lutz was named assistant coach for the Washington Huskies women's gymnastics team. He was in the role for one season and did not return after head coach Bob Levesque's retirement in 2006 and the subsequent hire of Joanne Bowers to lead Washington gymnastics.

In August 2012, he was named as the general manager of Axis Gymnastics in Jackson, Wyoming.

== Personal life ==
Lutz married fellow Oklahoma gymnast Linda Haverly in 1995. They later divorced.
