= Sailing at the 1991 Pan American Games =

Sailing at the 1991 Pan American Games lists the results of all sailing-related events held at the 1991 Pan American Games in Havana, Cuba. Open, men's and women's events were held.

== Men's events ==
Event	Gold	Silver	Bronze
Lechner A-390 Div II	United States; Ted Huang	Argentina; Carlos Espinola	Canada; Murray McCaig
Finn	Canada; Lawrence Lemieux	Brazil; Christoph Bergmann	Mexico; Erick Mergenthaler
470	Canada; Nigel Cochrane; Jeff Eckard	Brazil; Bernardo Arndt; Eduardo Melchert	United States; Morgan Larson; Paul Kerner
Laser	Brazil; Peter Tanscheit	United States; Sam Kerner	Argentina; José Campero

== Women's events ==
Event	Gold	Silver	Bronze
Lechner A-390 Div II	United States; Lanee Butler	Canada; Edithe Trepanier	Argentina; María Espínola
Laser Radial	Canada; Shona Moss	Brazil; Marion Scheel	United States; Karen Long
470	United States	Mexico; Karla Gutiérrez; Margarita Pasos	Brazil; Monica Scheel; Cláudia Swan

== Open events ==
Event	Gold	Silver	Bronze
Snipe	Cuba	Brazil	United States; Peter Commette; Tarasa Davis
Lightning	} Matt Fisher; Steve Callison; Sean Michael Fidler	Chile	Brazil

== Medal table ==
Place	Nation	Gold medal	Silver medal	Bronze medal	Total
1	United States	4	1	3	8
2	Canada	3	1	1	5
3	Brazil	1	4	2	7
4	Cuba	1	0	0	1
5	Argentina	0	1	2	3
4	Mexico	0	1	1	2
5	Chile	0	1	0	1
Total		9	9	9	27
