= Bob Stelter =

American artistic gymnast

- Full name: Robert Stelter
- Nickname: Air Bob
- Height: 5 ft 6 in (168 cm)

Gymnastics career
- Discipline: Men's artistic gymnastics
- Country represented: United States
- College team: Nebraska Cornhuskers
- Head coach: Francis Allen
- Retired: 1992
Medal record
Men's artistic gymnastics
Representing United States
Event	1st	2nd	3rd
Pan American Games	0	1	1
Total	0	1	1
Pan American Games
Silver medal – second place	1991 Havana	Team
Bronze medal – third place	1991 Havana	Rings

Robert Stelter is a retired American artistic gymnast. He was a member of the United States men's national artistic gymnastics team and won two medals at the 1991 Pan American Games.

== Early life and education ==
Stelter called Burbank, California home as a youth. He competed in gymnastics as a child and was the top-ranked 16 year old in California. He was a United States junior national team member for five years. He attended John Burroughs High School and graduated in 1986. Despite wanting to attend nearby University of California, Los Angeles and be a member of the UCLA Bruins men's gymnastics team, coach Art Shurlock did not extend one of two available scholarships to Lutz. With offers made from several other schools, Lutz chose to enroll at the University of Nebraska–Lincoln to pursue gymnastics.

== Gymnastics career ==
While a student at Nebraska, Stelter was an Nebraska Cornhuskers men's gymnastics team member. He competed from 1987 to 1990 and finished as one of the most accomplished gymnasts in program history with 24 combined individual titles. International Gymnast Magazine named him the MVP of Nebraska's 1990 NCAA men's gymnastics championship winning team.

Following graduation, Stelter competed at the 1990 U.S. National Gymnastics Championships and was the United States champion in the floor exercise. In 1991, Stelter was chosen to represent the United States at the 1991 Pan American Games. He received a silver medal as the team placed second in the team all-around. He also won the bronze medal in the still rings.

He participated in the 1992 United States Olympic trials, but was not selected as a member of the 1992 Summer Olympics team.

== Personal life ==
Stelter worked as a stuntman for Twilight Zone: The Movie.
