= Gymnastics at the 1991 Pan American Games =

- Gymnastics pictograms
- Venue: Sala Polivalente Alejandro Urgelles
- Start date: August 3, 1991
- End date: August 18, 1991
- No. of events: 21 (8 men, 13 women)
- Competitors: 138 from 15 nations

This page shows the results of the Gymnastics Competition at the 1991 Pan American Games in Havana, Cuba. Artistic and rhythmic gymnastics competition was held from August 3 to August 18 in Santiago de Cuba at the Sala Polivalente Alejandro Urgelles.

== Medal summary ==
=== Medal table ===
Place	Nation	Gold medal	Silver medal	Bronze medal	Total
1	Cuba	14	8	5	27
2	United States	6	5	7	18
3	Canada	2	5	5	12
4	Brazil	2	1	0	3
5	Mexico	0	1	3	4
6	Argentina	0	0	2	1
6	Guatemala	0	0	1	1
6	Puerto Rico	0	0	1	1
Total		24	20	24	68

=== Artistic gymnastics ===
==== Men's events ====
Games	Gold	Silver	Bronze
Team all-around	Cuba; Felix Aguilera; Erick López; Raul Menendez; Damian Merino; Casimiro Suárez; Jose Tejada	United States; Trent Dimas; Jeff Lutz; Dominick Minicucci; Mike Racanelli; Bob Stelter; Mark Warburton	Mexico; Licurgo Diaz; Oscar Figueroa; Francisco Lopez; Luis López; Alejandro Peniche; Andres Sanchez
Individual all-around	Erick López; Cuba	Jose Tejada; Cuba	Felix Aguilera; Cuba
Floor exercise	Damian Merino; Cuba Mike Racanelli; United States	—N/a	Trent Dimas; United States
Pommel horse	Jose Tejada; Cuba	Felix Aguilera; Cuba	Dominick Minicucci; United States
Rings	Damian Merino; Cuba	Erick López; Cuba	Bob Stelter; United States
Vault	Erick López; Cuba	Casimiro Suárez; Cuba	Victor Colon; Puerto Rico Alejandro Peniche; Mexico
Parallel bars	Erick López; Cuba Dominick Minicucci; United States	—N/a	Felix Aguilera; Cuba Isidro Ibarrondo; Argentina Luis López; Mexico
Horizontal bar	Felix Aguilera; Cuba	Luis López; Mexico	Trent Dimas; United States

==== Women's events ====
Games	Gold	Silver	Bronze
Team all-around	United States; Hillary Anderson; Juliet Bangerter; Kristin McDermott; Chelle Stack; Stephanie Woods; Anne Woynerowski	Cuba; Georgina Benítez; Lisandra Caldezo; Leyanet Gonzalez; Indira Hernandez; Odaimis Jiménez; Dayami Núñez	Canada; Mylene Fleury; Stacey Galloway; Colleen Johnson; Stephanie Pierce; Tara Sherwood; Jennifer Wood
Individual all-around	Stephanie Woods; United States	Chelle Stack; United States	Romina Plataroti; Argentina
Vault	Luisa Parente; Brazil	Anne Woynerowski; United States	Jennifer Wood; Canada
Uneven bars	Luisa Parente; Brazil	Mylene Fleury; Canada Hillary Anderson; United States	—N/a
Balance beam	Leyanet Gonzalez; Cuba Stephanie Woods; United States	—N/a	Odaimis Jiménez; Cuba Luisa Portocarrero; Guatemala
Floor exercise	Chelle Stack; United States	Dayami Núñez; Cuba	Georgina Benítez; Cuba

=== Men's results ===
==== Team ====
RANK	FINAL RANKING	SCORE
Gold medal	Cuba; Felix Aguilera; Erick López; Raul Menendez; Damian Merino; Casimiro Suárez; Jose Tejada	580.550
Silver medal	United States; Trent Dimas; Jeff Lutz; Dominick Minicucci; Mike Racanelli; Bob Stelter; Mark Warburton	575.450
Bronze medal	Mexico; Licurgo Diaz; Oscar Figueroa; Francisco Lopez; Luis López; Alejandro Peniche; Andres Sanchez	558.300
4.	Puerto Rico; Victor Colon; Diego Lizardi; Pedro Rosado; Francisco Suarez; Hector Tanco; Pedro Tort	543.000
5.	Brazil; Irano Carvalho; Adriano Engelke; Gilberto Figueira; Andre Monteiro; Marco Monteiro; Ricardo Nassar	541.350
6.	Canada; Darren Bersuk; Kris Burley; Mark Hudson; Richard Ikeda; Jason Papp	539.900
7.	Argentina; Sergio Alvaríno; Sebastian Alvarez; Pablo Delazari; Martin Gonzalez; Isidro Ibarrondo; Gustavo Pisos	529.750

==== All-around ====
Rank	Gymnast	Floor Exercise	Pommel Horse	Rings	Vault	Parallel Bars	Horizontal Bar	Total
Gold medal	Erick López (CUB)	9.600	9.500	9.800	9.800	9.600	9.800	58.300
Silver medal	Jose Tejada (CUB)	9.500	9.800	9.700	9.750	9.550	9.800	58.100
Bronze medal	Felix Aguilera (CUB)	9.500	9.350	9.700	9.750	9.800	9.650	57.750
4	Mike Racanelli (USA)	9.800	9.650	9.700	9.350	9.250	9.150	56.900
4	Trent Dimas (USA)	9.600	9.650	9.800	8.750	9.350	9.750	56.900
4	Mark Warburton (USA)	9.350	9.700	9.550	9.150	9.450	9.700	56.900
7	Luis López (MEX)	8.900	9.600	9.400	9.550	9.500	9.750	56.700
8	Victor Colon (PUR)	9.400	9.450	9.100	9.700	9.250	9.500	56.400
9	Alejandro Peniche (MEX)	9.450	9.250	9.550	9.650	9.200	9.000	56.100
10	Francisco Lopez (MEX)	9.250	8.850	9.350	9.250	9.100	9.150	54.950
11	Marco Monteiro (BRA)	9.250	9.400	9.050	8.650	8.850	9.550	54.700
12	Isidro Ibarrondo (ARG)	9.400	8.150	8.850	9.400	8.900	9.550	54.250
13	Kris Burley (CAN)	9.400	9.150	8.750	9.500	8.500	8.600	53.900
14	Darren Bersuk (CAN)	8.900	9.150	9.400	9.300	8.200	8.800	53.750
15	Richard Ikeda (CAN)	8.950	9.400	8.600	8.800	8.950	9.000	53.700
16	Gilberto Figueira (BRA)	9.050	8.850	8.700	9.000	8.750	8.750	53.100
17	Pedro Tort (PUR)	9.200	9.350	8.400	9.300	8.700	7.800	52.750

==== Floor exercise ====
RANK	FINAL RANKING	SCORE
Gold medal	Damian Merino (CUB)	9.700
Gold medal	Mike Racanelli (USA)	9.700
Bronze medal	Trent Dimas (USA)	9.550
4.	Raul Menendez (CUB)	9.400
5.	Luis López (MEX)	9.350
6.	Kris Burley (CAN)	8.950
7.	Alejandro Peniche (MEX)	8.900
8.	Sergio Alvaríno (ARG)	7.900

==== Pommel horse ====
RANK	FINAL RANKING	SCORE
Gold medal	Jose Tejada (CUB)	9.800
Silver medal	Felix Aguilera (CUB)	9.750
Bronze medal	Dominick Minicucci (USA)	9.700
4.	Luis López (MEX)	9.600
4.	Trent Dimas (USA)	9.600
6.	Marco Monteiro (BRA)	9.400
7.	Victor Colon (PUR)	9.350
8.	Pedro Tort (PUR)	8.850

==== Rings ====
RANK	FINAL RANKING	SCORE
Gold medal	Damian Merino (CUB)	9.900
Silver medal	Erick López (CUB)	9.825
Bronze medal	Bob Stelter (USA)	9.625
4.	Alejandro Peniche (MEX)	9.575
5.	Luis López (MEX)	9.500
6.	Victor Colon (PUR)	9.250
7.	Mark Warburton (USA)	9.000
8.	Kris Burley (CAN)	8.700

==== Vault ====
RANK	FINAL RANKING	SCORE
Gold medal	Erick López (CUB)	9.750
Silver medal	Casimiro Suárez (CUB)	9.737
Bronze medal	Victor Colon (PUR)	9.700
Bronze medal	Alejandro Peniche (MEX)	9.700
5.	Luis López (MEX)	9.525
6.	Kris Burley (CAN)	9.300
7.	Bob Stelter (USA)	9.225
8.	Trent Dimas (USA)	8.900

==== Parallel bars ====
RANK	FINAL RANKING	SCORE
Gold medal	Erick López (CUB)	9.675
Gold medal	Dominick Minicucci (USA)	9.675
Bronze medal	Isidro Ibarrondo (ARG)	9.600
Bronze medal	Felix Aguilera (CUB)	9.600
Bronze medal	Luis López (MEX)	9.600
6.	Mark Warburton (USA)	9.400
7.	Marco Monteiro (BRA)	9.200
7.	Alejandro Peniche (MEX)	9.200

==== Horizontal bar ====
RANK	FINAL RANKING	SCORE
Gold medal	Felix Aguilera (CUB)	9.900
Silver medal	Luis López (MEX)	9.800
Bronze medal	Trent Dimas (USA)	9.750
4.	Erik Heikkila (ISV)	9.700
5.	Raul Hernandez (CUB)	9.500
6.	Dominick Minicucci (USA)	9.400
7.	Isidro Ibarrondo (ARG)	9.350
8.	Jason Papp (CAN)	8.050

=== Women's results ===
==== Team ====
RANK	FINAL RANKING	SCORE
Gold medal	United States; Hillary Anderson; Juliet Bangerter; Kristin McDermott; Chelle Stack; Stephanie Woods; Anne Woynerowski	380.775
Silver medal	Cuba; Georgina Benítez; Lisandra Caldezo; Leyanet Gonzalez; Indira Hernandez; Odaimis Jiménez; Dayami Núñez	376.675
Bronze medal	Canada; Mylene Fleury; Stacey Galloway; Colleen Johnson; Stephanie Pierce; Tara Sherwood; Jennifer Wood	373.825
4.	Brazil; Debora Biffe; Viviane Cardoso; Soraia Carvalho; Anne Fernandez; Silvia Mendes; Luisa Parente	372.925
5.	Argentina; Maria Eugenia Garcia; Andrea Giordano; Andrea Kovelinsky; Romina Plataroti; Karina Oliveira; Gabriela Sobrado	370.650
6.	Mexico; Mariana Ascensio; Mariana Castañeda; Brenda Magaña; Liliana Mosquedo; Karina Olivares; Victoria Vallejo	365.375

==== All-around ====
Rank	Gymnast	Vault	Uneven Bars	Balance Beam	Floor Exercise	Total
Gold medal	Stephanie Woods (USA)	9.675	9.550	9.775	9.600	38.600
Silver medal	Chelle Stack (USA)	9.700	9.650	9.575	9.600	38.525
Bronze medal	Romina Plataroti (ARG)	9.575	9.500	9.675	9.600	38.400
4	Luisa Parente (BRA)	9.725	9.775	9.200	9.625	38.325
5	Odaimis Jiménez (CUB)	9.800	9.500	9.625	9.225	38.175
6	Mylene Fleury (CAN)	9.700	9.525	9.300	9.250	37.775
7	Luisa Portocarrero (GUA)	9.400	9.675	9.200	9.425	37.700
8	Jennifer Wood (CAN)	9.650	9.500	8.900	9.600	37.650
8	Georgina Benítez (CUB)	9.475	9.350	9.300	9.525	37.650
8	Kristin McDermott (USA)	9.375	9.500	9.200	9.575	37.650
11	Indira Hernandez (CUB)	9.275	9.350	9.500	9.400	37.575
12	Karina Oliveira (ARG)	9.400	9.300	9.425	9.425	37.550
13	Andrea Giordano (ARG)	9.450	9.425	8.825	9.400	37.100
14	Stephanie Pierce (CAN)	9.500	9.450	8.475	9.450	36.925

==== Vault ====
RANK	FINAL RANKING	SCORE
Gold medal	Luisa Parente (BRA)	9.775
Silver medal	Anne Woynerowski (USA)	9.662
Bronze medal	Jennifer Wood (CAN)	9.650
4.	Karina Olivares (MEX)	9.550
5.	Stephanie Woods (USA)	9.462
6.	Odaimis Jiménez (CUB)	9.450
7.	Silvia Mendes (BRA)	9.387
8.	Stephanie Pierce (CAN)	9.362

==== Uneven bars ====
RANK	FINAL RANKING	SCORE
Gold medal	Luisa Parente (BRA)	9.775
Silver medal	Mylene Fleury (CAN)	9.625
Silver medal	Hillary Anderson (USA)	9.625
4.	Romina Plataroti (ARG)	9.600
5.	Viviane Cardoso (BRA)	9.575
6.	Jennifer Wood (CAN)	9.550
7.	Andrea Giordano (ARG)	9.450
8.	Anne Woynerowski (USA)	9.225

==== Balance beam ====
RANK	FINAL RANKING	SCORE
Gold medal	Leyanet Gonzalez (CUB)	9.700
Gold medal	Stephanie Woods (USA)	9.700
Bronze medal	Odaimis Jiménez (CUB)	9.650
Bronze medal	Luisa Portocarrero (GUA)	9.650
5.	Kristin McDermott (USA)	9.275
6.	Soraia Carvalho (BRA)	9.175
7.	Mylene Fleury (CAN)	9.125
8.	Stephanie Pierce (CAN)	8.450

==== Floor exercise ====
RANK	FINAL RANKING	SCORE
Gold medal	Chelle Stack (USA)	9.700
Silver medal	Dayami Núñez (CUB)	9.625
Bronze medal	Georgina Benítez (CUB)	9.600
4.	Luisa Portocarrero (GUA)	9.575
5.	Romina Plataroti (ARG)	9.550
6.	Mariana Castañeda (MEX)	9.500
6.	Kristin McDermott (USA)	9.500
8.	Brenda Magaña (MEX)	9.475

== Rhythmic gymnastics ==
=== Women's competition ===
==== All-around ====
RANK	FINAL RANKING
Gold medal	Lourdes Medina (CUB)
Silver medal	Mary Fuzesi (CAN)
Bronze medal	Susan Cushman (CAN)

==== Rope ====
RANK	FINAL RANKING
Gold medal	Lourdes Medina (CUB)
Silver medal	Mary Fuzesi (CAN)
Bronze medal	Naomi Hewitt-Couturier (USA)

==== Hoop ====
RANK	FINAL RANKING
Gold medal	Mary Fuzesi (CAN)
Silver medal	Lourdes Medina (CUB)
Silver medal	Susan Cushman (CAN)

==== Ball ====
RANK	FINAL RANKING
Gold medal	Lourdes Medina (CUB)
Silver medal	Mary Fuzesi (CAN)
Bronze medal	Madonna Gimotea (CAN)
Bronze medal	Jennifer Lovell (USA)

==== Clubs ====
RANK	FINAL RANKING
Gold medal	Lourdes Medina (CUB)
Silver medal	Naomi Hewitt-Couturier (USA)
Bronze medal	Yalili Fung (CUB)

==== Group ====
RANK	FINAL RANKING
Gold medal	Cuba
Silver medal	Brazil; Alessandra Seligman; Bibiana de Castro; Débora Moraes; Gabriela Baal; Valquíria Rosário; Alessandra Frederico
Bronze medal	Canada

==== Team ====
RANK	FINAL RANKING
Gold medal	Canada
Silver medal	Cuba
Bronze medal	United States

== See also ==
- Pan American Gymnastics Championships
- South American Gymnastics Championships
- Gymnastics at the 1992 Summer Olympics
