= Basketball at the 1991 Pan American Games =

- Venue: Coliseo de la Ciudad Deportiva
- Dates: August 3–17, 1991
- Teams: 10

Medalists
Gold medal	Puerto Rico
Silver medal	Mexico
Bronze medal	United States

The men's basketball tournament at the 1991 Pan American Games was held from August 3 to 17, 1991 in Havana, Cuba. The women also competed in the Cuban capital, from August 3 to 12. Coliseo de la Ciudad Deportiva was the venue for the games.

== Men's competition ==
=== Participating nations ===
Group A	Group B
Argentina; Bahamas; Cuba; United States; Venezuela	Brazil; Canada; Mexico; Puerto Rico; Uruguay

=== Preliminary round ===
Group A	Pts	Pld	W	L	PF	PA	Diff
United States	8	4	4	0	386	293	+93
Argentina	6	4	2	2	354	348	+6
Venezuela	6	4	2	2	331	342	–11
Cuba	5	4	1	3	230	253	–23
Bahamas	5	4	1	3	243	308	–65

- 1991-08-03

United States	92 – 88	Cuba

- 1991-08-04

Bahamas	104 – 96	Argentina

- 1991-08-05

United States	91 – 66	Venezuela
Cuba	99 – 90	Bahamas

- 1991-08-06

United States	87 – 81	Argentina

- 1991-08-07

Venezuela	84 – 70	Cuba

- 1991-08-08

Venezuela	96 – 81	Bahamas

- 1991-08-09

United States	116 – 58	Bahamas
Argentina	77 – 72	Cuba

- 1991-08-10

Argentina	100 – 85	Venezuela

Group B	Pts	Pld	W	L	PF	PA	Diff
Brazil	8	4	4	0	339	247	+92
Puerto Rico	7	4	3	1	357	334	+23
Mexico	6	4	2	2	311	320	–9
Uruguay	5	4	1	3	283	327	–44
Canada	4	4	0	4	259	321	–62

- 1991-08-04

Brazil	94 – 72	Uruguay
Puerto Rico	95 – 77	Canada

- 1991-08-05

Brazil	85 – 55	Canada
Puerto Rico	102 – 100	Mexico

- 1991-08-06

Uruguay	62 – 61	Canada

- 1991-08-07

Brazil	81 – 58	Mexico

- 1991-08-08

Puerto Rico	98 – 78	Uruguay

- 1991-08-09

Mexico	79 – 66	Canada
Brazil	79 – 62	Puerto Rico

- 1991-08-10

Mexico	74 – 71	Uruguay

=== Quarterfinals ===
- 1991-08-12

Puerto Rico	111 – 104	Venezuela
Mexico	91 – 77	Argentina
United States	114 – 68	Uruguay
Cuba	96 – 92 [OT]	Brazil

=== Semifinals ===
- 1991-08-13 — 5th/8th place

Brazil	95 – 64	Argentina
Venezuela	85 – 79	Uruguay

- 1991-08-15 — 1st/4th place

Puerto Rico	73 – 68	United States
Mexico	93 – 87	Cuba

=== Finals ===
- 1991-08-11 — 9th/10th place

Bahamas	75 – 62	Canada

- 1991-08-16 — 7th/8th place

Argentina	71 – 63	Uruguay

- 1991-08-16 — 5th/6th place

Brazil	90 – 88	Venezuela

- 1991-08-17 — Bronze Medal Match

United States	93 – 74	Cuba

- 1991-08-17 — Gold Medal Match

Puerto Rico	77 – 65	Mexico

=== Final ranking ===
RANK	TEAM
1.	Puerto Rico
2.	Mexico
3.	United States
4.	Cuba
5.	Brazil
6.	Argentina
7.	Uruguay
8.	Bahamas
9.	Canada
10.	Venezuela

=== Rosters ===
-	Team	Roster
1	Puerto Rico	Puerto Rico; José Ortiz, Federico López, Raymond Gause, Edwin Pellot, Jerome Mincy, James Carter, Javier Colon, Ramón Rivas, Mario Morales, Edgar Loja, Pablo Alicea, Richard Soto, Coach. -
2	Mexico	Mexico; Oscar Castellanos, Antonio Reyes, Apolonio Torres, Roberto González, Enrique González, Rafael Willis, Octavio Robles, Luis López, Arturo Sánchez, Jose Luis Arroyos, Alberto Martínez, Arturo Montes, Coach. Arturo Guerrero
3	United States	(United States) USA; Anthony Bennett, Terry Dehere, Grant Hill, Thomas Hill, James Jackson, Adam Keefe, Christian Laettner, Eric Montross, Tracy Murray, Mike Peplowski, Clarence Weatherspoon, Walt Williams, Coach. Gene Keady (Purdue University)
4	Cuba	Cuba; Angel Caballero, Yudi Abreu, Osmar Caballero, Noangel Luaces, Jose Luis Díaz, Raul Dubois, Leonardo Pérez, Lazaro Borrell, Luciano Rivero, Augusto Duquesne, Roberto Simón, Andres Guibert, Coach. Carmelo Ortega
5	Brazil	Brazil; Paulinho Villas Boas, Guerrinha, Gerson Victalino, João Vianna, Rolando Ferreira, Fernando Minucci, Maury de Souza, Marcel, Luiz Zanon, Evandro, Luisão, Josuel, Coach. José Medalha
6	Argentina	Argentina; Marcelo Milanesio, Ariel Bernardini, Esteban De la Fuente, Orlando Tourn, Diego Osella, Esteban Pérez, Diego Maggi, Miguel Cortijo, Juan Espil, Luis Oroño, Coach. Carlos Boismené
7	Uruguay	Uruguay; Alejandro Costa, Juan Blanc, Marcelo Capalbo, Jeffrey Granger, Gustavo Sczygielski, Javier Guerra, Luis Larrosa, Hebert Núñez, Horacio Perdomo, Álvaro Tito, Daniel Koster, Enrique Tucuna. Coach: Javier Espíndola
8	Bahamas	(The Bahamas) Bahamas; Benjamin Russell, Mark Dean, Cutter, Neville Adderley, Michael Wilson, Zhivago Nicholls, Glenroy Ferguson, Sears, Anthony Hinds, Jeff Pinder, Lynden Rose, Vincent Knowles
9	Canada	Canada; Joey Vickery, Phil Stewart, Phil Dixon, Tom Johnson, Alex Urosevic, Patrick Jebbison, Barry Bekkadam, Ted Byrne, Martin Keane, Andrew Steinfeld, Scott Petterson, Spencer McKay, Coach. Jerry Hemmings
10	Venezuela	Venezuela; Victor Díaz, Cesar Portillo, Alex Nelcha, Nestor Solórzano, Armando Becker, Luis Jiménez Guevara, Sam Shepherd, Carl Herrera, Luis Sosa, Gabriel Estaba, Ivan Olivares, Omar Walcott, Coach. Julio Toro

== Awards ==
=== Topscorer ===
- (Cuba) Leonardo Perez (150 pts)

1991 Pan American Games winners

Puerto Rico
First title

== Women's competition ==
=== Participating nations ===
Argentina
Brazil
Canada
Cuba
United States

=== Preliminary round ===
Team	Pts	Pld	W	L	PF	PA	Diff
Brazil	8	4	4	0	334	293	+41
United States	7	4	3	1	359	268	+91
Cuba	6	4	2	2	346	299	+47
Canada	5	4	1	3	288	317	–29
Argentina	4	4	0	4	204	354	–150

- 1991-08-03

United States	87 – 70	Canada
Cuba	93 – 47	Argentina

- 1991-08-04

Brazil	87 – 84	United States
Cuba	95 – 71	Canada

- 1991-08-05

United States	97 – 40	Argentina
Brazil	74 – 66	Canada

- 1991-08-07

Canada	81 – 61	Argentina
Brazil	90 – 87	Cuba

- 1991-08-08

United States	91 – 71	Cuba
Brazil	83 – 56	Argentina

=== Semifinals ===
- 1991-08-10

Brazil	87 – 78	Canada
Cuba	86 – 81	United States

=== Finals ===
- 1991-08-12 — Bronze Medal Match

United States	92 – 61	Canada

- 1991-08-12 — Gold Medal Match

Brazil	97 – 76	Cuba

=== Final ranking ===
RANK	TEAM
1.	Brazil
2.	Cuba
3.	United States
4.	Canada
5.	Argentina

=== Awards ===
1991 Pan American Games winners

Brazil
Third title

== See also ==
- Basketball at the 1992 Summer Olympics
