= Karen LaFace =

American diver

Karen Marie LaFace
Personal information
- Born: January 29, 1966 (age 60) Pittsburgh, Pennsylvania, U.S.

Sport
- Event(s): Diving, springboard
- College team: Ohio State University 1988
- Club: Pitt Aquatic Club; McDonald's Divers; U.S. National Diving Team
- Coached by: Julian Krug (Pitt Aquatic); Vince Panzano (OSU)
Medal record
Women's diving
Representing the United States
Pan American Games
Gold medal – first place	1991 Havana	3m Springboard

Karen Marie LaFace (born January 29, 1966) is a retired American female diver for Ohio State University and a 1992 U.S. Olympic competitor in 3m springboard diving. She later worked as a physician and coached diving in Ithaca, New York.

== Early diving ==
In her early years, LaFace participated in swimming, ballet and acrobatics frequently, but always took an interest in the diving boards over the pool where she practiced swimming. With former training in acrobatics, she used to try doing flips on the boards. Realizing that taking diving practice would conflict with her regular swimming practices which she had grown tired of, she welcomed the opportunity to enroll in a diving squad at the University of Pittsburgh.

Laface began training in dive training around the age of 9 or 10, and by around 1980 was coached by Julian Krug of the Pitt Aquatic Club, who greatly improved her diving, and where she did nearly all of her high school training. By the age of 10, she trained at the University of Pittsburgh Pool, eventually with Krug by the age of 14, as the university had the only indoor platform tower in the area. LaFace also attended and competed in swimming for Churchill High School in dual meets where in her Freshman year was Coached by Bill Griffith. Her primary Coach Julian Krug at Pitt Aquatics also coached the swim team at the University of Pittsburgh. As a Sophomore at Churchill High, she won a WPIAL championship in 1982, and in 1981 had placed second in the WPIAL and third in the State Championship. By her Sophomore year, she trained with the Pitt Club, a highly competitive program, in the Pittsburgh suburb of Oakland, six nights a week.

LaFace was state diving champion during her high school year at the PIAA (Pennsylvania) Meet and competed in the National Sports Festival in Indianapolis, Indiana, placing 5th in the 10-meter platform diving event. She received All-American honors as a sophomore at Pennsylvania's Churchill High School in 1985.

== Ohio State ==
She attended Ohio State University from 1985 to 1988, where she dove for Coach Vince Panzano, a former diver for Ohio State. She also dove and competed at times for McDonalds Diver's, coached by Panzano. She won an NCAA Championship on the 1-metre springboard in 1987 while attending Ohio State. In 1986–87, she was the Diver of the Year, and won the 3-meter dive at the Big Ten Championships. In an exceptional year for her diving career, in 1987 she was named the Ohio State Athlete of the Year.

== International competition ==
She swam ten years for the U.S. National Team. LaFace captured a gold medal on springboard at the 1991 Pan American Games, and won the 3-metre springboard at both the 1990 Volksbank International in Vienna (Wien), Austria, and the 1990 US Olympic Festival.

She competed for the US at the 1992 Barcelona Olympics, finishing in ninth place in the Women's 3m Springboard event. LaFace won the gold medal in the same event a year earlier at the 1991 Pan American Games.

After college and swimming competition, she attended the University of Pennsylvania medical school, completed a residency in family medicine at Brown University, and then, beginning around 1996 practiced in Ithaca, New York, with a specialty in women's primary care. She worked for the Guthrie Medical Group, and served as head diving coach at New York's Ithaca College.

=== Honors ===
Highly recognized as a diver and in academics, she was a recipient of a Schottenstein Post-Graduate Scholarship, the Grimes Davidge Academic Award, the Big Ten Medal of Honor, the Big Ten Diver of the Year, the Ohio State Athlete of the Year and two Academic all-Big Ten selections.
