= Sailing at the 1992 Summer Olympics – Women's 470 =

Sailing at the Olympics

470 Women's at the Games of the XXV Olympiad
- 470
- Venue: Barcelona
- Dates: 27 July to 3 August
- Competitors: 34 from 17 nations
- Teams: 17

Medalists
1st place, gold medalist(s)		Theresa Zabell; Patricia Guerra	Spain
2nd place, silver medalist(s)		Leslie Jean Egnot; Jan Shearer	New Zealand
3rd place, bronze medalist(s)		Jennifer Isler; Pamela Healy	United States

The Women's 470 Class Competition at the 1992 Summer Olympics was held from 27 July to 4 August 1992, in Barcelona, Spain. Points were awarded for placement in each race. The best six out of seven race scores did count for the final placement.

== Results ==
Rank	Helmsman (Country)	Crew	Race I		Race II		Race III		Race IV		Race V		Race VI		Race VII		Total Points	Total -1
Rank	Helmsman (Country)	Crew	Rank	Points	Rank	Points	Rank	Points	Rank	Points	Rank	Points	Rank	Points	Rank	Points	Total Points	Total -1
1	Theresa Zabell (ESP)	Patricia Guerra	~~PMS~~	~~24.0~~	2	3.0	3	5.7	1	0.0	4	8.0	1	0.0	7	13.0	53.7	29.7
2	Leslie Egnot (NZL)	Jan Shearer	~~PMS~~	~~24.0~~	5	10.0	1	0.0	9	15.0	1	0.0	6	11.7	1	0.0	60.7	36.7
3	Jennifer Isler (USA)	Pamela Healy	~~PMS~~	~~24.0~~	6	11.7	2	3.0	2	3.0	2	3.0	5	10.0	5	10.0	64.7	40.7
4	Larisa Moskalenko (EUN)	Elena Pakholtchik	2	3.0	~~14~~	~~20.0~~	4	8.0	4	8.0	7	13.0	2	3.0	4	8.0	63.0	43.0
5	Yumiko Shige (JPN)	Alicia Kinoshita	4	8.0	1	0.0	8	14.0	5	10.0	10	16.0	~~13~~	~~19.0~~	3	5.7	72.7	53.7
6	Florence Le Brun (FRA)	Odile Barre	1	0.0	11	17.0	9	15.0	3	5.7	9	15.0	7	13.0	~~12~~	~~18.0~~	83.7	65.7
7	Maria Quarra (ITA)	Anna Maria Barabino	~~PMS~~	~~24.0~~	3	5.7	5	10.0	8	14.0	14	20.0	10	16.0	2	3.0	92.7	68.7
8	Peggy Hardwiger (GER)	Christina Pinnow	5	10.0	7	13.0	7	13.0	7	13.0	3	5.7	11	17.0	~~DSQ~~	~~24.0~~	95.7	71.7
9	Jennifer Norton Lidgett (AUS)	Addy Elizabeth Bucek	~~PMS~~	~~24.0~~	10	16.0	12	18.0	6	11.7	5	10.0	3	5.7	13	19.0	104.4	80.4
10	Kati Läike (FIN)	Anna Slunga-Tallberg	3	5.7	~~17~~	~~23.0~~	10	16.0	16	22.0	11	17.0	4	8.0	15	21.0	112.7	89.7
11	Penny Stamper-Davis (CAN)	Sarah McLean	7	13.0	13	19.0	6	11.7	~~14~~	~~20.0~~	8	14.0	14	20.0	11	17.0	114.7	94.7
12	Debbie Jarvis (GBR)	Sue Carr	~~PMS~~	~~24.0~~	8	14.0	11	17.0	13	19.0	12	18.0	8	14.0	9	15.0	121.0	97.0
13	Susanne Ward (DEN)	Marianne Halfdan-Nielsen	6	11.7	12	18.0	14	20.0	11	17.0	6	11.7	~~17~~	~~23.0~~	14	20.0	121.4	98.4
14	Ida Andersen (NOR)	Tonje Kristiansen	8	14.0	9	15.0	~~15~~	~~21.0~~	15	21.0	13	19.0	9	15.0	10	16.0	121.0	100.0
15	Cláudia Swan (BRA)	Monica Scheel	~~PMS~~	~~24.0~~	4	8.0	17	23.0	12	18.0	16	22.0	12	18.0	6	11.7	124.7	100.7
16	Renata Srbová (TCH)	Radmila Dobnerová	~~PMS~~	~~24.0~~	15	21.0	13	19.0	10	16.0	15	21.0	15	21.0	8	14.0	136.0	112.0
17	Margarita Pasos (MEX)	Karla Gutiérrez	9	15.0	16	22.0	16	22.0	17	23.0	~~17~~	~~23.0~~	16	22.0	16	22.0	149.0	126.0

=== Daily standings ===
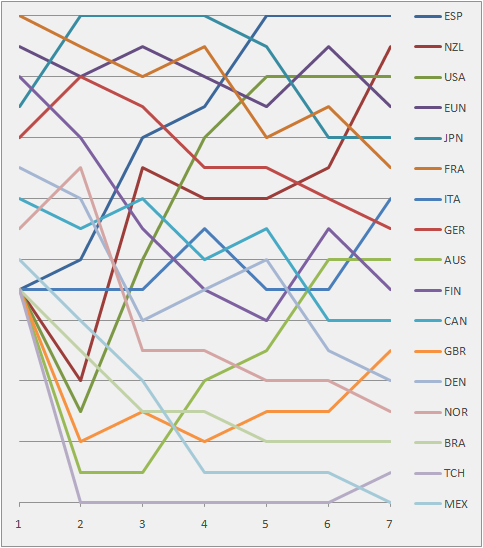
Graph showing the daily standings in the 470 Women's during the 1992 Summer Olympics
