= Canada at the 1991 Pan American Games =

- IOC code: CAN
- NOC: Canadian Olympic Committee

in Havana 8–18 August 1991
- Medals Ranked 3rd: Gold 22 Silver 46 Bronze 59 Total 127

Pan American Games appearances (overview)
- 1955; 1959; 1963; 1967; 1971; 1975; 1979; 1983; 1987; 1991; 1995; 1999; 2003; 2007; 2011; 2015; 2019; 2023

The 13th Pan American Games were held in Havana, Cuba from August 2 to August 18, 1991.

== Medals ==
=== Gold ===
===== Cycling =====
- Men's 1,000m Sprint (Track): Richard Young
- Women's 1,000m Sprint (Track): Tanya Dubnicoff

===== Gymnastics =====
- Women's Hoop: Mary Fuzesi
- Women's Team: Canada

===== Swimming =====
- Women's 50m Freestyle: Kristin Topham
- Women's 100m Butterfly: Kristin Topham

===== Sailing =====
- Men's 470: Nigel Cochrane Jeff Eckard
- Women's Laser Radial: Shona Moss
- Men's Finn: Lawrence Lemieux

=== Silver ===
===== Athletics =====
- Men's Pole Vault: Doug Wood
- Men's 4 × 100 m Relay: Canada
- Women's 10,000 metres: Lisa Harvey

===== Boxing =====
- Men's Welterweight (– 67 kg): Greg Johnson
- Men's Middleweight (– 75 kg): Chris Johnson

===== Cycling =====
- Women's 3,000m Individual Pursuit (Track): Clara Hughes

===== Diving =====
- Women's 3m Springboard: Paige Gordon

===== Gymnastics =====
- Women's Uneven Bars: Mylène Fleury

===== Gymnastics =====
- Women's All-Around: Mary Fuzesi
- Women's Rope: Mary Fuzesi
- Women's Ball: Mary Fuzesi

===== Judo =====
- Men's Bantamweight (– 60 kg): Ewan Beaton
- Men's Featherweight (– 65 kg): Jean-Pierre Cantin

===== Swimming =====
- Men's 4 × 100 m Freestyle: Canada
- Women's 100m Backstroke: Nikki Dryden
- Women's 200m Backstroke: Nikki Dryden
- Women's 200m Breaststroke: Chantal Dubois
- Women's 200m Individual Medley: Joanne Malar
- Women's 400m Individual Medley: Joanne Malar
- Women's 4 × 100 m Freestyle: Canada
- Women's 4 × 200 m Freestyle: Canada

===== Synchronized swimming =====
- Women's Team: Canada

===== Wrestling =====
- Men's Freestyle (– 100 kg): John Matile
- Men's Freestyle (– 130 kg): Andy Borodow

===== Sailing =====
- Women's Sailboard: Edithe Trepanier

=== Bronze ===
===== Athletics =====
- Men's 1,500 metres: Dan Bertoia
- Women's 1,500 metres: Sarah Howell

===== Boxing =====
- Men's Lightweight (– 60 kg): William Irwin
- Men's Light Heavyweight (– 81 kg): Robert Dale Brown
- Men's Heavyweight (– 91 kg): Tom Glesby
- Men's Super Heavyweight (+ 91 kg): Terry Campbell

===== Cycling =====
- Women's Team Time Trial (Road): Canada

===== Gymnastics =====
- Women's Vault: Jennifer Wood
- Women's Team Competition: Canada

===== Gymnastics =====
- Women's All-Around: Susan Cushman
- Women's Hoop: Susan Cushman
- Women's Ball: Madonna Gimotea
- Women's Group: Canada

===== Judo =====
- Women's Extra Lightweight (– 48 kg): Brigitte Lastrade
- Women's Half Heavyweight (– 72 kg): Alison Webb
- Women's Heavyweight (+ 72 kg): Jane Patterson
- Women's Open: Jane Patterson

===== Swimming =====
- Men's 400m Individual Medley: Jasen Pratt
- Women's 100m Freestyle: Kristin Topham
- Women's 200m Freestyle: Kim Paton
- Women's 400m Freestyle: Tara-Lynn Seymour
- Women's 800m Freestyle: Tara-Lynn Seymour
- Women's 200m Backstroke: Joanne Malar
- Women's 100m Breaststroke: Lisa Flood
- Women's 200m Breaststroke: Lisa Flood
- Women's 200m Butterfly: Beth Hazel

===== Synchronized swimming =====
- Women's Duet: Julie Bibby and Corinne Keddie

===== Wrestling =====
- Men's Freestyle (– 57 kg): Robert Dawson
- Men's Freestyle (– 82 kg): David Hohl
- Men's Freestyle (– 90 kg): Gregory Edgelow
- Men's Greco-Roman (– 90 kg): Gregory Edgelow
- Men's Greco-Roman (– 100 kg): John Matile
- Men's Greco-Roman (– 130 kg): Andy Borodow

===== Sailing =====
- Men's Sailboard: Murray McCaig

== Results by event ==
=== Basketball ===
==== Men's team competition ====
- Preliminary Round (Group B)
  - Lost to Puerto Rico (77-95)
  - Lost to Brazil (55-85)
  - Lost to Uruguay (61-62)
  - Lost to Mexico (66-79)
- Classification Match
  - 9th/10th place: Lost to Bahamas (62-75) → 10th place
- Team Roster

==== Women's team competition ====
- Preliminary Round Robin
  - Lost to United States (70-87)
  - Lost to Cuba (71-95)
  - Lost to Brazil (66-74)
  - Defeated Argentina (81-61)
- Semifinals
  - Lost to Brazil (78-87)
- Bronze Medal Match
  - Lost to United States (61-92) → 4th place
- Team Roster

=== Volleyball ===
==== Men's team competition ====
- Preliminary Round
  - Lost to United States (1-3)
  - Lost to Cuba (0-3)
  - Lost to Brazil (0-3)
  - Lost to Argentina (1-3)
  - Defeated Puerto Rico (3-1)
- Classification Match
  - 5th/6th place: Lost to Puerto Rico (2-3) → 6th place
- Team Roster

==== Women's team competition ====
- Preliminary Round
  - Lost to Brazil
  - Lost to Argentina
  - Lost to Peru
  - Lost to Cuba
  - Defeated United States
- Semi Finals
  - Lost to Cuba (0-3)
- Bronze Medal Match
  - Lost to Peru (0-3) → 4th place
- Team Roster

== See also ==
- Canada at the 1990 Commonwealth Games
- Canada at the 1992 Summer Olympics
