= Stephan Rose =

Guyanese boxer

Personal information
- Nationality: Guyanese
- Born: Georgetown, Guyana
- Weight: Super Bantamweight

Boxing career

Boxing record
- Total fights: 14
- Wins: 7
- Win by KO: 5
- Losses: 7
- Draws: 0
Medal record
Representing Guyana
Pan American Games
Bronze medal – third place	1991 Havana	Flyweight

Stephan Rose is a boxer from Guyana who participated in the 1991 Pan American Games. He won the bronze medal in boxing in the Men's Flyweight division (less than 51 kg in weight).
