= Diving at the 1991 Pan American Games =

Diving at the 1991 Pan American Games was held from August 2 to August 18, 1991 in Havana, Cuba. There were three events, for both men and women.

== Medal table ==
| Place | Nation | Gold medal | Silver medal | Bronze medal | Total |
|---|---|---|---|---|---|
| 1 | United States | 5 | 3 | 1 | 9 |
| 2 | Cuba | 1 | 1 | 3 | 5 |
| 3 | Mexico | 0 | 1 | 2 | 3 |
| 4 | Canada | 0 | 1 | 0 | 1 |
| Total | | 6 | 6 | 6 | 18 |

== Medalists ==
=== Men ===
| Event | Gold | Silver | Bronze |
|---|---|---|---|
| 1m springboard | Mark Lenzi; United States | Abel Ramírez; Cuba | Jorge Mondragón; Mexico |
| 3m springboard | Kent Ferguson; United States | Mark Bradshaw; United States | Jorge Mondragón; Mexico |
| 10m platform | Roger Ramírez; Cuba | Jesús Mena; Mexico | Patrick Jeffrey; United States |

=== Women ===
| Event | Gold | Silver | Bronze |
|---|---|---|---|
| 1m springboard | Jill Schlabach; United States | Alison Malsch; United States | Mayte Garbey; Cuba |
| 3m springboard | Karen LaFace; United States | Paige Gordon; Canada | Mayte Garbey; Cuba |
| 10m platform | Eileen Richetelli; United States | Alison Malsch; United States | María Carmuza; Cuba |

== See also ==
- Diving at the 1992 Summer Olympics
