= Trent Dimas =

American artistic gymnast (born 1970)

- Full name: Trent Dimas
- Born: November 10, 1970 (age 56) Albuquerque, New Mexico, U.S.
- Height: 172 cm (5 ft 8 in)

Gymnastics career
- Discipline: Men's artistic gymnastics
- Country represented: United States; (1989–1993)
- College team: Nebraska Cornhuskers
- Gym: Gold Cup Gymnastics
Medal record
Men's artistic gymnastics
Representing United States
Event	1st	2nd	3rd
Olympic Games	1	0	0
Pan American Games	0	1	2
Goodwill Games	0	1	0
Total	1	2	2
Olympic Games
Gold medal – first place	1992 Barcelona	Horizontal bar
Pan American Games
Silver medal – second place	1991 Havana	Team
Bronze medal – third place	1991 Havana	Floor
Bronze medal – third place	1991 Havana	Horizontal bar
Goodwill Games
Silver medal – second place	1990 Seattle	Team

Trent Dimas (born November 10, 1970; Albuquerque, N.M.) is a Hispanic American gymnast and Olympic champion. Now retired, Dimas was an elite senior-level international artistic gymnast.

== Early life and education ==
Dimas became a member of the U.S. junior national team at the age of 13 and made the U.S. senior national team at the age of 15. He attended the University of Nebraska–Lincoln his freshman year where he became a two time All American and a member of UNL's 1990 NCAA Men's Gymnastics championship team. After one season of NCAA competition, Dimas left his athletic scholarship to train full-time in hopes of making a U.S. Olympic Team.

Following his athletic career, in 1992, Dimas graduated from Columbia University School of General Studies in New York City with a B.A. in political science.

== Gymnastics career ==
As a nationally and internationally ranked athlete, he competed at the Goodwill Games (Team, Silver), Pan American Games (FX, Bronze and HB, Bronze) (See Gymnastics at the 1991 Pan American Games), won the American Cup (AA) and was the U.S. Men's Vault Champion, Parallel Bars Champion and Horizontal Bar Champion.

In an era of compulsory routines and a straightforward format to Olympic team trials (and before apparatus specialists), Dimas was ranked 5th All Around at trials (top 6 made the Olympic Team) which placed him on the U.S. Olympic Team roster. He competed in all six of the men's apparatuses in qualification at the 1992 Summer Olympics in Barcelona where he received a gold medal on horizontal bar in the event final. This was the second time that an American gymnast, male or female, won a gold medal in an Olympics held outside the United States. Only Frank Kriz (on vault at Paris in 1924) had done so previously. Dimas was also the first Latino Olympic gymnastics medalist from the USA.
