= 1991 Pan American Games medal table =

- Location: Havana, Cuba

Highlights
- Most gold medals: Cuba (140)
- Most total medals: United States (353)

The 1991 Pan American Games, officially known as the XI Pan American Games, were a continental multi-sport event held in Havana, Cuba, from 2 to 18 August 1991. At the Games, 4,519 athletes selected from 39 National Olympic Committees (NOCs) participated in events in 27 sports. Twenty-six nations earned medals during the competition, and fourteen won at least one gold medal.

== Medal table ==
The ranking in this table is based on medal counts published by several media organizations. By default, the table is ordered by the number of gold medals won by the athletes representing a nation. (In this context, a nation is an entity represented by an NOC). The number of silver medals is taken into consideration next and then the number of bronze medals. If nations are still tied, equal ranking is given and they are listed alphabetically by IOC country code.

^{1}	Host nation

To sort this table by nation, total medal count, or any other column, click on the icon next to the column title.

* Host nation (Cuba)

Rank	Nation	Gold	Silver	Bronze	Total
1	Cuba*	140	62	63	265
2	United States	130	125	98	353
3	Canada	24	46	59	129
4	Brazil	21	21	37	79
5	Mexico	14	23	38	75
6	Argentina	11	15	29	55
7	Colombia	5	15	21	41
8	Venezuela	4	14	20	38
9	Puerto Rico	3	13	11	27
10	Chile	2	1	7	10
11	Jamaica	2	1	5	8
12	Suriname	1	2	1	4
13	Trinidad and Tobago	1	1	0	2
14	Costa Rica	1	0	1	2
15	Dominican Republic	0	5	4	9
16	Bermuda	0	2	0	2
17	Guatemala	0	1	5	6
18	Nicaragua	0	1	2	3
19	Bahamas	0	1	1	2
19	Ecuador	0	1	1	2
21	Bolivia	0	1	0	1
21	Panama	0	1	0	1
21	Uruguay	0	1	0	1
24	Peru	0	0	3	3
25	Guyana	0	0	2	2
25	Virgin Islands	0	0	2	2
27	Haiti	0	0	1	1
Totals (27 entries)		359	353	411	1,123
