= Slunga =

Slunga is a Finnish surname. Notable people with the surname include:

- Anna Slunga-Tallberg (born 1962), Finnish sailor
- Riikka Slunga-Poutsalo (born 1971), Finnish politician
