= María Espínola =

Argentine windsurfer

Personal information
- Nationality: Argentine
- Born: María Inés Espínola Lorenzo; 11 December 1974 (age 51) Corrientes, Argentina

Sport
- Sport: Windsurfing
Medal record
Representing Argentina
Pan American Games
Bronze medal – third place	1991 Havana	Lechner

María Inés Espínola Lorenzo (Note: In this Spanish name, the first or paternal surname is Espínola and the second or maternal family name is Lorenzo.) (born 11 December 1974) is an Argentine windsurfer. She competed in the women's Lechner A-390 event at the 1992 Summer Olympics.
