= Eduardo Melchert =

Brazilian sailor

Personal information
- Nationality: Brazilian
- Born: 28 September 1961 (age 64)

Sport
- Sport: Sailing
Medal record
Representing Brazil
Pan American Games
Silver medal – second place	1991 Havana	470

Eduardo Costa Melchert (born 28 September 1961) is a Brazilian sailor. He competed in the men's 470 event at the 1992 Summer Olympics.
