= María Elena Giusti =

Venezuelan synchronized swimmer (born 1968)

Personal information
- Full name: María Elena Giusti Lugo
- Nationality: Venezuela
- Born: 13 November 1968 (age 57)
- Height: 1.73 m (5 ft 8 in)
- Weight: 59 kg (130 lb)

Sport
- Sport: Swimming
- Strokes: Synchronized swimming
Medal record
Synchronized swimming
Representing Venezuela
Pan American Games
Silver medal – second place	1991 Havana	Women's solo
Bronze medal – third place	1995 Mar del Plata	Women's solo
- Updated on 10 February 2015

María Elena Giusti Lugo (born November 13, 1968) is a retired synchronized swimmer from Venezuela.

She represented her country in the women's solo competition at the 1988 and 1992 Summer Olympics but failed to reach the medal podium; and at the latter sporting event, she was the Olympic flag bearer for Venezuela.

At the 1991 and 1995 Pan American Games, she won a silver and a bronze medal respectively; and she also competed at the 1991 and 1994 World Aquatics Championships.
