= Boxing at the 1991 Pan American Games =

The Men's Boxing Tournament at the 1991 Pan American Games was held in Havana, Cuba from August 2 to August 18. It served as a qualification tournament for the 1992 Summer Olympics. The number one and two earned a ticket for the Barcelona Games. The host country dominated the boxing event, winning all weight divisions except for one: the Light Welterweight (– 63.5 kg). Preliminary bouts were held at the new, multi-purpose Sala Polivalente Kid Chocolate, finals at Sports City Coliseum.

== Qualification ==
Shannon Briggs became one of a few boxers to ever qualify for the Games finale, thus gaining the silver medal already, without any competition. His Cuban opponent, Félix Savón, while being regarded much higher by the world amateur rankings, had to fight a semifinal bout.

== Medal winners ==
Event	Gold	Silver	Bronze
Light Flyweight (– 48 kilograms)	Rogelio Marcelo; Cuba	Ricardo Sánchez López; Mexico	Nelson Dieppa; Puerto Rico
Light Flyweight (– 48 kilograms)	Rogelio Marcelo; Cuba	Ricardo Sánchez López; Mexico	Fernando Retayud; Colombia
Flyweight (– 51 kilograms)	José Ramos; Cuba	David Serradas; Venezuela	José Freitas; Brazil
Flyweight (– 51 kilograms)	José Ramos; Cuba	David Serradas; Venezuela	Stephan Rose; Guyana
Bantamweight (– 54 kilograms)	Enrique Carrión; Cuba	Carlos Gerena; Puerto Rico	Luis Alberto Ojeda; Venezuela
Bantamweight (– 54 kilograms)	Enrique Carrión; Cuba	Carlos Gerena; Puerto Rico	Javier Calderón; Mexico
Featherweight (– 57 kilograms)	Arnaldo Mesa; Cuba	Kenneth Friday; United States	Rogerio Dezorzi; Brazil
Featherweight (– 57 kilograms)	Arnaldo Mesa; Cuba	Kenneth Friday; United States	Arnulfo Castillo; Mexico
Lightweight (– 60 kilograms)	Julio González; Cuba	Patrice Brooks; United States	Delroy Leslie; Jamaica
Lightweight (– 60 kilograms)	Julio González; Cuba	Patrice Brooks; United States	William Irwin; Canada
Light Welterweight (– 63.5 kilograms)	Stevie Johnston; United States	Edgar Ruiz; Mexico	Luis da Silva; Brazil
Light Welterweight (– 63.5 kilograms)	Stevie Johnston; United States	Edgar Ruiz; Mexico	Aníbal Santiago Acevedo; Puerto Rico
Welterweight (– 67 kilograms)	Juan Hernández Sierra; Cuba	Greg Johnson; Canada	Santos Beltrán; Mexico
Welterweight (– 67 kilograms)	Juan Hernández Sierra; Cuba	Greg Johnson; Canada	José Guzmán; Venezuela
Light Middleweight (– 71 kilograms)	Juan Carlos Lemus; Cuba	Miguel Jiménez; Puerto Rico	Lucas França; Brazil
Light Middleweight (– 71 kilograms)	Juan Carlos Lemus; Cuba	Miguel Jiménez; Puerto Rico	Ravea Springs; United States
Middleweight (– 75 kilograms)	Ramón Garbey; Cuba	Chris Johnson; Canada	Richard Santiago; Puerto Rico
Middleweight (– 75 kilograms)	Ramón Garbey; Cuba	Chris Johnson; Canada	Michael DeMoss; United States
Light Heavyweight (– 81 kilograms)	Orestes Solano; Cuba	Raimundo Yant; Venezuela	Dale Brown; Canada
Light Heavyweight (– 81 kilograms)	Orestes Solano; Cuba	Raimundo Yant; Venezuela	Terrence Poole; Guyana
Heavyweight (– 91 kilograms)	Félix Savón; Cuba	Shannon Briggs; United States	Tom Glesby; Canada
Super Heavyweight (+ 91 kilograms)	Roberto Balado; Cuba	Harold Arroyo; Puerto Rico	Elio Ibarra; Argentina
Super Heavyweight (+ 91 kilograms)	Roberto Balado; Cuba	Harold Arroyo; Puerto Rico	Terry Campbell; Canada

== Medal table ==
Place	Nation	Gold medal	Silver medal	Bronze medal	Total
1	Cuba	11	0	0	11
2	United States	1	3	2	6
3	Puerto Rico	0	3	3	6
4	Canada	0	2	4	6
5	Mexico	0	2	3	5
6	Venezuela	0	2	2	4
7	Brazil	0	0	4	4
8	Guyana	0	0	2	2
9	Argentina	0	0	1	1
9	Colombia	0	0	1	1
9	Jamaica	0	0	1	1
Total		12	12	23	47
