= Sean Michael Fidler =

Sport
- Sport: Sailing
Medal record
Representing United States
Pan American Games
Gold medal – first place	1991 Havana	Lightning

Sean Michael Fidler is an American sailboat racer and sailplane competition pilot.

Sean was a US Sailing Team Gold Medalist in Yachting at the 1991 Pan American Games in the Lightning Class. Sean has also won several world and national championships in various one-design sailboat classes.

Sean is also an American sailplane (glider) competition pilot. Sean is a member of the 2015, 2016 and 2017 US Soaring Team and will compete in the 18-meter class at the 2017 FAI Gliding World Championships in Benalla, Australia, in January 2017. Sean placed third in the 1st Pan American Gliding Championships held in Benton, Tennessee in April 2015 in the 15-meter class. He qualified for the final of the 2021 Sailplane Grand Prix.
