= Cláudia Swan =

Brazilian sailor

Personal information
- Full name: Cláudia Swan de Freitas
- Born: 3 October 1974 (age 51) Niterói, Brazil

Sport
- Sport: Sailing
Medal record
Representing Brazil
Pan American Games
Bronze medal – third place	1991 Havana	470

Cláudia Swan de Freitas (born 3 October 1974) is a Brazilian sailor. She competed in the women's 470 event at the 1992 Summer Olympics. She's married to Clinio Freitas and the aunt of Isabel Swan, both Olympic medallists in sailing.
