= Jorge Mondragón =

Jorge Mondragón may refer to:

- Jorge Mondragón (diver)
- Jorge Mondragón (actor)
