= Archery at the 1991 Pan American Games =

This page shows the results of the archery competition at the 1991 Pan American Games, held from August 2 to August 18, 1991, in Havana, Cuba.

== Men's competition ==
=== Recurve ===
RANK	NAME
Gold medal	Darrell Pace (USA)
Silver medal	Edwin Eliason (USA)
Bronze medal	Ricardo Rojas (MEX)

=== Recurve 30 m ===
RANK	NAME
Gold medal	Edwin Eliason (USA)
Silver medal	Jay Barrs (USA)
Bronze medal	Ricardo Rojas (MEX)

=== Recurve 50 m ===
RANK	NAME
Gold medal	Eric Brumlow (USA)
Silver medal	Miguel León (CUB)
Bronze medal	Ricardo Rojas (MEX)

=== Recurve 70 m ===
RANK	NAME
Gold medal	Darrell Pace (USA)
Silver medal	Eric Brumlow (USA)
Bronze medal	Eduardo Messmacher (MEX)

=== Recurve 90 m ===
RANK	NAME
Gold medal	Eric Brumlow (USA)
Silver medal	Jay Barrs (USA)
Bronze medal	Ricardo Rojas (MEX)

=== Recurve Teams ===
RANK	NAME
Gold medal	United States
Silver medal	Mexico
Bronze medal	Cuba

== Women's competition ==
=== Recurve ===
RANK	NAME
Gold medal	Denise Parker (USA)
Silver medal	Jennifer O'Donnell (USA)
Bronze medal	Aurora Bretón (MEX)

=== Recurve 30 m ===
RANK	NAME
Gold medal	Denise Parker (USA)
Silver medal	Kitty Frazier (USA)
Bronze medal	Aurora Bretón (MEX)

=== Recurve 50 m ===
RANK	NAME
Gold medal	Janet Dykman (USA)
Silver medal	Denise Parker (USA)
Bronze medal	Miriam Véliz (MEX)

=== Recurve 60 m ===
RANK	NAME
Gold medal	Denise Parker (USA)
Silver medal	Jennifer O'Donnell (USA)
Bronze medal	Alejandra García (MEX)

=== Recurve 70 m ===
RANK	NAME
Gold medal	Denise Parker (USA)
Silver medal	Kitty Frazier (USA)
Bronze medal	Aurora Bretón (MEX)

=== Recurve Teams ===
RANK	NAME
Gold medal	United States
Silver medal	Mexico
Bronze medal	Cuba

== Medal table ==
Place	Nation	Gold medal	Silver medal	Bronze medal	Total
1	United States	12	9	0	21
2	Mexico	0	2	10	12
3	Cuba	0	1	2	3
Total		12	12	12	36

== See also ==
- Archery at the 1992 Summer Olympics
