= Monica Scheel =

Brazilian sailor

Personal information
- Born: 9 March 1967 (age 59) São Paulo, Brazil

Sport
- Sport: Sailing
Medal record
Representing Brazil
Pan American Games
Bronze medal – third place	1991 Havana	470

Monica Scheel (born 9 March 1967) is a Brazilian sailor. She competed in the women's 470 event at the 1992 Summer Olympics.
