= Mike Racanelli =

American gymnast (born 1970)

- Full name: Mike Racanelli
- Born: October 20, 1970 (age 55)

Gymnastics career
- Discipline: Men's artistic gymnastics
- Country represented: United States
- College team: Ohio State Buckeyes
Medal record
Men's artistic gymnastics
Representing United States
Event	1st	2nd	3rd
Pan American Games	1	1	0
Total	1	1	0
Pan American Games
Gold medal – first place	1991 Havana	Floor
Silver medal – second place	1991 Havana	Team
- Awards: Nissen-Emery Award (1990)

Mike Racanelli (born October 20, 1970) is an American retired gymnast. He was a member of the United States men's national artistic gymnastics team and won a gold and silver medal at the 1991 Pan American Games. His specialty was floor exercise, where he had an expressive style.

== Gymnastics career ==
=== College ===
Racanelli competed for Ohio State University, where he was a 10-time All-American. His coach at OSU was Peter Kormann, who had medalled in the 1976 Olympics. In 1990, Racanelli won the Nissen Award, the "Heisman" of gymnastics, as well as the Big Ten Medal of Honor. At the 1990 NCAA championships, Racanelli won gold in the all-around and floor exercise. Also, he qualified for finals on all 6 apparatus that year, the only athlete to do so. Racanelli is a member of Ohio State's Men's Varsity "O" Hall of Fame.

=== Elite ===
In 1989 Racanelli won gold on the floor exercise at the U.S. National Championships and bronze in the all-around. That year, he was also a member of the U.S. World Championships team.

In 1990, Racanelli won floor exercise at the Chunichi Cup, becoming the first American since 1984 to win an event gold. Later that year, he competed at the U.S. Olympic Cup.

In 1991, Racanelli, recovering from a shoulder injury, finished only 11th in the all-around at Nationals but won gold on the floor. Later that year, he won floor gold at the World University Games. In August, he won another floor gold, at the Pan American Games.

In 1992, Racanelli did not participate in Nationals or Olympic Trials.

In 1995, Racanelli finished 16th overall at Nationals.

In 1996, at Nationals, Racanelli finished fourth on pommel horse and 6th on vault. His all-around score was 17th. Only the top 14 were invited to Olympic Trials.
