= Muciño =

Surname list

Muciño is a surname. Notable people with the surname include:

- Arely Muciño (born 1989), Mexican professional boxer
- César Muciño (1972–2003), Mexican cyclist
- Claudia Muciño (born 1971), Mexican former professional tennis player
- Jennifer Mucino-Fernandez (born 2002), American archer
- Luis Muciño (born 1936), Mexican former cyclist
- Octavio Muciño (1950–1974), Mexican professional football player
