= Radmila Dobnerová =

Czech sailor

Personal information
- Nationality: Czech
- Born: 3 May 1969 (age 55); Prague, Czechoslovakia

Sport
- Sport: Sailing

Radmila Dobnerová (born 3 May 1969) is a Czech sailor. She competed in the women's 470 event at the 1992 Summer Olympics.
