= Raimundo Yant =

Venezuelan boxer (born 1964)

Personal information
- Born: October 2, 1964 (age 61)
Medal record
Men's Boxing
Representing Venezuela
Pan American Games
Silver medal – second place	1991 Havana	Light Heavyweight
Central American and Caribbean Games
Silver medal – second place	1986 Santiago	Light Heavyweight
Bronze medal – third place	1990 Mexico City	Light Heavyweight

Raimundo Rafael Yant Rivas (born October 2, 1964) is a former Venezuelan boxer.

He competed for his native country at the 1992 Summer Olympics in Barcelona, Spain, where he was defeated in the first round of the Men's Light Heavyweight (– 81 kg) by Algeria's Mohamed Benguesmia (11:15). A year earlier he captured the silver medal in the same division at the 1991 Pan American Games.
