= John Clayton (sportswriter) =

American sportswriter (1954–2022)

- Born: May 11, 1954; Braddock, Pennsylvania, U.S.
- Died: March 18, 2022 (aged 67); Bellevue, Washington, U.S.
- Education: Duquesne University
- Occupation: Sports journalist
- Years active: 1972–2022
- Spouse: Pat

John Travis Clayton (May 11, 1954 – March 18, 2022) was an American sports journalist who was a National Football League (NFL) writer and reporter for ESPN, as well as a senior writer for ESPN.com. He also worked for The Pittsburgh Press and The News Tribune in Tacoma, Washington. Clayton received the Dick McCann Memorial Award (now the Bill Nunn Award) from the Pro Football Writers of America in recognition of his long-time coverage of professional football.

== Early life ==
Clayton was born in Braddock, Pennsylvania, a suburb of Pittsburgh, on May 11, 1954. He started covering sports while he was attending Churchill Area High School. Beginning in 1972, he covered the Pittsburgh Steelers in twice-weekly dispatches for the Daily Press in St. Marys, Pennsylvania. He later wrote for Steel City Sports, and also served as a stringer for AP Radio and CBS Radio. Clayton graduated from Duquesne University in 1976.

== Career ==
=== Newspaper ===
Clayton started with The Pittsburgh Press after college. In May 1978, he was sent to cover a Steelers minicamp. While there, he discovered and reported a rule violation involving Steelers players wearing shoulder pads during minicamp, which would cost the team a third-round draft pick. The affair was dubbed "Shouldergate" by Clayton. He consequently became persona non grata for some time in his hometown for his role in the affair.

Clayton eventually worked his way up to become the Steelers beat writer at the Press, before leaving the paper in 1986. He moved across the country and began covering the Seattle Seahawks for The News Tribune in Tacoma, Washington. It was at this time that he began appearing in NFL segments on Seattle sports radio station KJR (AM) on host Nanci Donnellan's program The Fabulous Sports Babe. When Donnellan's show was picked up by ESPN for national syndication, Clayton came along as an NFL correspondent.

=== ESPN ===
Clayton joined ESPN as a reporter in 1995. He later added to his duties a weekly radio show during the NFL offseason. He hosted the show with former NFL quarterback Sean Salisbury; the show included "Four Downs," a debate with Salisbury over current NFL issues. Their debates often became quite heated, with Clayton underscoring how Salisbury "only started 12 more games in the NFL than I did". Clayton characterized their relationship as "a good chemistry", but added that his "mission is to destroy him". There was debate as to seriousness of the animosity between Clayton and Salisbury.

Clayton notably appeared in a This is SportsCenter commercial, in which he was featured out of character in a sleeveless Slayer t-shirt and a concealed ponytail. He was initially reluctant to participate in the ad, fearing that its humorous nature would sully his standing for "serious reporting" that he had developed over the years. However, it turned out to be popular, and gave him "a new level of celebrity that was totally unexpected". After more than two decades with ESPN, Clayton left as part of mass layoffs by the network on May 31, 2017.

=== Radio ===
Clayton remained a frequent contributor to KJR, which he first joined in 1990 as a radio talk show host. He hosted its Sports Saturday show on Saturday mornings. He was a regular caller to sports-talk radio stations around the country. After Seattle's KIRO changed to an all-sports format, Clayton moved his show to the new ESPN affiliate. He continued to work at KIRO after he was let go by ESPN. Starting in February 2021, Clayton contributed to 104.3 The Fan's website and radio station in Denver.

== Awards and honors ==
In recognition of his long and distinguished contribution to the coverage of pro football, Clayton received the Dick McCann Memorial Award from the Pro Football Writers of America in 2007. This distinction puts him in the "writer's wing" of the Pro Football Hall of Fame.

Clayton was also inducted into the sports hall of fame of his alma mater, Duquesne University, in 2001. His hometown of Braddock designated March 18, 2018, as "John Clayton Day" in his honor.

== Personal life ==
Clayton was married to his wife, Pat, until his death. They met while working for The News Tribune, where she covered bowling. He died on March 18, 2022, at the age of 67, at a hospital in Bellevue, Washington, from an unspecified brief illness.
