= Jeff Eckard =

Canadian sailor

Personal information
- Nationality: Canadian
- Born: 18 December 1965 (age 60) Pietermaritzburg, South Africa

Sport
- Sport: Sailing
Medal record
Representing Canada
Pan American Games
| Gold medal – first place | 1991 Havana | 470 |

Jeffrey Mark Eckard (born 18 December 1965) is a Canadian sailor. He competed in the men's 470 event at the 1992 Summer Olympics.
