= Javier Careaga =

Mexican swimmer (born 1967)

Javier Careaga OLY
Personal information
- Full name: Javier Careaga Tagueña
- Born: November 17, 1967 (age 58)

Sport
- Sport: Swimming
- Strokes: Breaststroke

Javier Careaga Tagueña (born November 17, 1967) is a former breaststroke swimmer Olympian from Mexico. As of 2008, he is the ex-president of the Mexican Swimming Federation (la Federación Mexicana de Natación).

== International competition ==
=== Summer Olympics ===
He competed at two consecutive Summer Olympic Games. The first Games were the 1988 Summer Olympics in Seoul, South Korea, as part of the Mexico swimming team. No one on the ten-member team at Seoul finished above the "heat" stage of competition. The second Games were the 1992 Summer Olympics in Barcelona, Catalonia, Spain, as part of the Mexico swimming team.
