= Sarah McLean =

Canadian sailor

Personal information
- Nationality: Canadian
- Born: 23 September 1967 (age 59) London, England
- Height: 170 cm (5 ft 7 in)

Sport
- Country: Canada
- Sport: Sailing
- Event: 470

Sarah McLean (born 23 September 1967) is a Canadian sailor. She competed in the women's 470 event at the 1992 Summer Olympics.
