= Nigel Cochrane =

Canadian sailor (born 1961)

Personal information
- Born: 12 November 1961 (age 65) Toronto, Ontario, Canada

Sport
- Sport: Sailing
Medal record
Representing Canada
Pan American Games
Gold medal – first place	1991 Havana	470

Nigel Cochrane (born 12 November 1961) is a Canadian sailor. He competed at the 1988 Summer Olympics and the 1992 Summer Olympics.
