= Gymnastics at the 1992 Summer Olympics – Men's horizontal bar =

Men's horizontal bar at the Games of the XXV Olympiad
- Artistic gymnastics pictogram
- Venue: Palau Sant Jordi
- Dates: 27 July – 2 August 1992
- Competitors: 93 from 25 nations
- Winning score: 9.875

Medalists
1st place, gold medalist(s)		Trent Dimas; United States
2nd place, silver medalist(s)		Andreas Wecker; Germany
2nd place, silver medalist(s)		Grigory Misutin; Unified Team

The men's horizontal bar competition was one of eight events for male competitors in artistic gymnastics at the 1992 Summer Olympics in Barcelona. The qualification and final rounds took place on July 29 and August 2, 1992 at the Palau Sant Jordi. There were 93 competitors from 25 nations, with nations in the team event having 6 gymnasts while other nations could have up to 3 gymnasts. The event was won by Trent Dimas of the United States, the nation's first victory in the event since 1932 and fourth gold medal in the horizontal bar overall (tying the Soviet Union for second-most all-time after Japan with six). Andreas Wecker of Germany earned silver in the nation's return after unification; the first medal for "Germany" in the event since 1952. The Unified Team's Grigory Misutin took bronze.

== Background ==
This was the 18th appearance of the event, which is one of the five apparatus events held every time there were apparatus events at the Summer Olympics (no apparatus events were held in 1900, 1908, 1912, or 1920). Three of the eight finalists from 1988 returned: bronze medalist Marius Gherman of Romania, seventh-place finisher Curtis Hibbert of Canada, and eighth-place finisher Andreas Wecker of East Germany (now competing for unified Germany). Grigory Misutin of the Unified Team was the reigning (1992) world champion; China's Li Chunyang had won in 1989 and 1991, sharing the title in the latter year with Germany's Ralf Büchner.

Puerto Rico and Slovenia each made their debut in the men's horizontal bar; twelve former Soviet republics competed together as the Unified Team. The United States made its 16th appearance, most of any nation; the Americans had missed only the inaugural 1896 event and the boycotted 1980 Games.

== Competition format ==
Each nation entered a team of six gymnasts or up to three individual gymnasts. All entrants in the gymnastics competitions performed both a compulsory exercise and a voluntary exercise for each apparatus. The scores for all 12 exercises were summed to give an individual all-around score. These exercise scores were also used for qualification for the apparatus finals. The two exercises (compulsory and voluntary) for each apparatus were summed to give an apparatus score. The top eight gymnasts, with a limit of two per nation, advanced to the final. In a change from previous years, the preliminary score had no effect on the final; once the eight finalists were selected, their ranking depended only on the final exercise. Non-finalists were ranked 9th through 93rd based on preliminary score.

== Schedule ==
All times are Central European Summer Time (UTC+2)

Date	Time	Round
Wednesday, 29 July 1992		Preliminary
Sunday, 2 August 1992	23:30	Final

== Results ==
Ninety-one gymnasts competed in the horizontal bar event during the compulsory and optional rounds on July 27 and 29. The eight highest scoring gymnasts advanced to the final on August 2. Each country was limited to two competitors in the final.

Rank	Gymnast	Nation	Preliminary			Final
Rank	Gymnast	Nation	Compulsory	Voluntary	Total	Final
1st place, gold medalist(s)	Trent Dimas	United States	9.725	9.725	19.450	9.875
2nd place, silver medalist(s)	Andreas Wecker	Germany	9.800	9.800	19.600	9.837
2nd place, silver medalist(s)	Grigory Misutin	Unified Team	9.800	9.900	19.700	9.837
4	Guo Linyao	China	9.725	9.700	19.425	9.812
5	Daisuke Nishikawa	Japan	9.750	9.725	19.475	9.787
5	Valery Belenky	Unified Team	9.825	9.700	19.525	9.787
5	Yoshiaki Hatakeda	Japan	9.750	9.650	19.400	9.787
8	Li Jing	China	9.825	9.725	19.550	6.425
