= Shona Moss =

Canadian sailor

Personal information
- Born: 12 April 1969 (age 57) Kitchener, Ontario, Canada
- Height: 175 cm (5 ft 9 in)
- Weight: 68 kg (150 lb; 10 st 10 lb)

Sport
- Sport: Sailing
Medal record
Representing Canada
Pan American Games
Gold medal – first place	1991 Havana	Laser

Shona Moss (born 12 April 1969) is a Canadian sailor. She competed in the Europe event at the 1992 Summer Olympics.
