= Margarita Pasos =

Mexican sailor (born 1965)

Personal information
- Nationality: Mexican
- Born: 20 October 1965 (age 60)

Sport
- Sport: Sailing
Medal record
Representing Mexico
Pan American Games
Silver medal – second place	1991 Havana	470
Central American and Caribbean Games
Bronze medal – third place	2002 San Salvador	Laser

Margarita Pasos Monsalvo (born 20 October 1965) is a Mexican sailor. She competed in the women's 470 event at the 1992 Summer Olympics.
