= Renata Srbová =

Czech sailor

Personal information
- Nationality: Czech
- Born: 16 June 1972 (age 53); Jablonec nad Nisou, Czechoslovakia

Sport
- Sport: Sailing

Renata Srbová (born 16 June 1972) is a Czech sailor. She competed in the women's 470 event at the 1992 Summer Olympics.
