= Jill Schlabach =

American diver

Personal information
- Born: Fairfield, Ohio, United States

Sport
- Sport: Diving
Medal record
Representing United States
Pan American Games
Gold medal – first place	1991 Havana	1 m springboard

Jill Schlabach (born 1965 or 1966) is an American diver. She competed in the NCAA Championship and the 1991 Pan American Games. Schlabach hoped to participate in the 1992 Olympics.

== Early life ==
Schlabach did tumbling in elementary school and did not survive until she entered high school. She said that she landed right on her face the first time she went off a board. After graduating from Fairfield High School, Schlabach attended the University of Cincinnati as a nursing major. Schlabach was one of the top divers in the Cincinnati Bearcats swimming and diving team. She earned a full athletic scholarship after she won 8th place in the NCAA Championships, where she earned an All-America title in 1986. She was named female diver of the year in 1986 by the Metro Conference and during the same year, she was a finalist in the 1 meter board competition at the U.S. Diving Championships.

Schlabach moved to Michigan in December 1989 after meeting University of Michigan coach Dick Kimball at an Olympic Festival. Kimball asked her to join his team and Schlabach found a job at the Michigan Medical Center. Once she improved her diving, she began to work less hours. During days that she worked, Schlabach trained from 4:10 to 6:00 PM, arrive at work by 7:00 PM, stay there till 7:30 AM, and then travel back to the pool to train until 9:30. Schlabach later competed at the FINA Diving World Cup in Canada.

== Diving at the 1991 Pan American Games ==
Schlabach was a surgical intensive-care nurse at Michigan Medicine at the time she competed in the 1991 Pan American Games. In order to have the time-off to compete, Schlabach worked four days of 12-hour shifts in a row. At the 1991 Pan American Games, Shlabach won the 1 meter springboard and Alison Malsch received second place. Schlabach scored 256.5 points and Maisch received 250.68 points, with Schlabach's best individual score being 55.08 points. She said she hoped to compete in the 3- and 10 meter events at the 1992 Olympics.
