= Karla Gutiérrez =

Mexican sailor (born 1966)

Personal information
- Nationality: Mexican
- Born: 21 December 1966 (age 59)

Sport
- Sport: Sailing
Medal record
Representing Mexico
Pan American Games
Silver medal – second place	1991 Havana	470

Karla Gutiérrez Athensburg (born 21 December 1966) is a Mexican sailor. She competed in the women's 470 event at the 1992 Summer Olympics.
