= Marianne Halfdan-Nielsen =

Danish sailor

Personal information
- Nationality: Danish
- Born: 7 May 1956 (age 70) Virum, Denmark

Sport
- Sport: Sailing

Marianne Halfdan-Nielsen (born 7 May 1956) is a Danish sailor. She competed in the women's 470 event at the 1992 Summer Olympics.
