= Edwin Eliason =

American archer (born 1938)

Personal information
- Born: May 1, 1938 (age 88) Port Gamble, Washington, United States

Sport
- Sport: Archery
Medal record
Representing United States
World Archery Championships
Gold medal – first place	1971 York	Recurve team
Gold medal – first place	1973 Grenoble	Recurve team
Gold medal – first place	1977 Canberra	Recurve team
Gold medal – first place	1981 Punta Ala	Recurve team
World Indoor Archery Championships
Gold medal – first place	1995 Birmingham	Recurve team
Pan American Games
Gold medal – first place	1983 Caracas	70m recurve
Gold medal – first place	1983 Caracas	Recurve team
Gold medal – first place	1991 Havana	30m recurve
Gold medal – first place	1991 Havana	Recurve team
Gold medal – first place	1995 Mar del Plata	Individual recurve
Gold medal – first place	1995 Mar del Plata	Recurve team
Silver medal – second place	1991 Havana	Individual recurve
Silver medal – second place	1995 Mar del Plata	30m recurve
Silver medal – second place	1995 Mar del Plata	50m recurve
Bronze medal – third place	1995 Mar del Plata	70m recurve

Edwin Murry Eliason (born May 1, 1938) is an American archer. He competed in the men's individual event at the 1972 Summer Olympics.
