= Luis López (gymnast) =

Mexican gymnast (1969–1995)

- Full name: Luis Alberto López Ghigliazza
- Born: 8 June 1969
- Died: 9 October 1995 (aged 26) Mexico City, Mexico

Gymnastics career
- Discipline: Men's artistic gymnastics
- Country represented: Mexico
- College team: New Mexico Lobos

Luis Alberto López Ghigliazza (8 June 1969 – 9 October 1995) was a Mexican gymnast. He competed in eight events at the 1992 Summer Olympics.
