= Anna Slunga-Tallberg =

Finnish sailor

Personal information
- Nationality: Finnish
- Born: 5 February 1962 (age 64) Helsinki, Finland

Sport
- Sport: Sailing

Anna Slunga-Tallberg (born 5 February 1962) is a Finnish sailor. She competed in the women's 470 event at the 1992 Summer Olympics.
