= Jennifer Wood (gymnast) =

Canadian gymnast

Personal information
- Born: 4 August 1972 (age 53) Edmonton, Alberta, Canada

Sport
- Sport: Gymnastics
Medal record
Pan American Games
Bronze medal – third place	1991 Havana	Team
Bronze medal – third place	1991 Havana	Vault

Jennifer Wood (born 4 August 1972) is a Canadian gymnast. She competed in six events at the 1992 Summer Olympics.
