= Mylène Fleury =

Canadian gymnast

Personal information
- Born: 12 January 1975 (age 51) Montreal, Quebec, Canada

Sport
- Sport: Gymnastics
Medal record
Pan American Games
Silver medal – second place	1991 Havana	Uneven bars
Bronze medal – third place	1991 Havana	Team

Mylène Fleury (born 12 January 1975) is a Canadian gymnast. She competed in six events at the 1992 Summer Olympics.
