= Marco Prado =

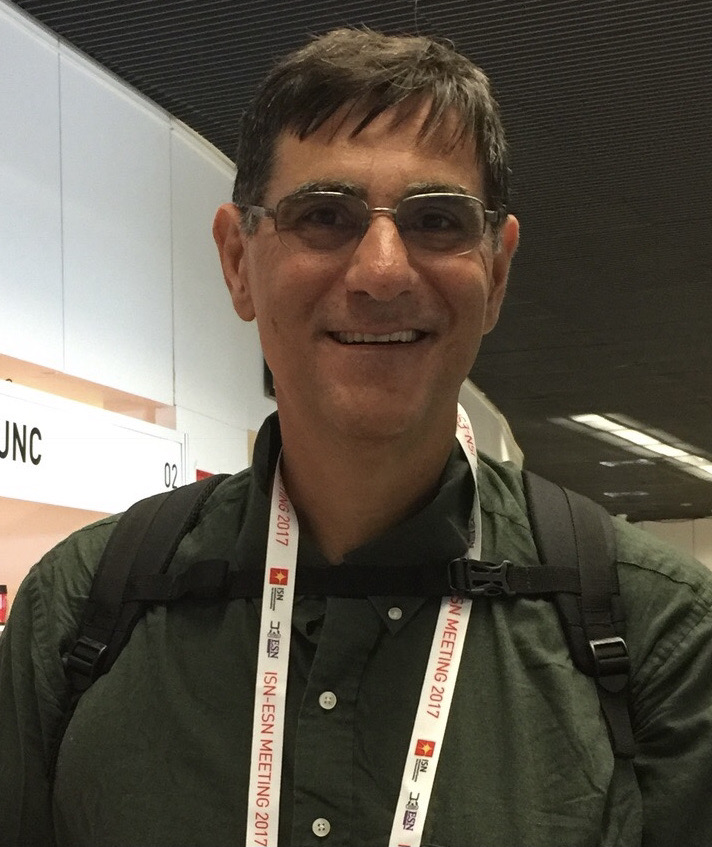
- Spouse: Vania Prado

Academic background
- Education: B Pharm, Fluminense Federal University; MSc, PhD, Biochemistry, Federal University of Minas Gerais

Academic work
- Institutions: University of Western Ontario; Federal University of Minas Gerais

Marco Antonio Maximo Prado is a Brazilian/Canadian neuroscientist. He is a Tier 1 Canada Research Chair in Neurochemistry of Dementia and Deputy Editor-in-Chief for Journal of Neurochemistry.

== Early life and education ==
Prado was born and raised in Brazil. He earned his Bachelor of Pharmacy from the Fluminense Federal University and his Master of Science and PhD in biochemistry from the Federal University of Minas Gerais. While conducting his doctorate degree, Prado spent three years at McGill University in Montreal, Quebec.

== Career ==
Following his PhD, Prado and his wife Vania returned to the Federal University of Minas Gerais where they ran separate molecular research laboratories. Prior to joining the faculty at the University of Western Ontario (UWO), Prado focused his research on studying proteins as they relate to prion diseases. He used mouse models to understand how abnormal protein behaviours play roles in neurodegenerative diseases. In 2004, Prado accepted a John Simon Guggenheim Memorial Foundation Fellowship in Neuroscience. Upon accepting a faculty appointment at UWO as a tenured full professor, Prado established a laboratory to focus on two projects. His first project aimed at studying molecular mechanisms in Alzheimer's disease while his second project focused on transmissible spongiform encephalopathies. In 2011, Prado and his wife were part of a team of researchers who demonstrated that investigated the role of cholinergic neurons in the striatum, a brain region affected in Parkinson's disease." As a result of his research, Prado was named a UWO Faculty Scholar in 2013.

In 2019, Prado was named a Tier 1 Canada Research Chair in Neurochemistry of Dementia and Editor-in-Chief for Reviews for Journal of Neurochemistry.
