= Ana Mendoza (swimmer) =

Mexican swimmer

Personal information
- Full name: Ana Mendoza Velasco
- Born: October 4, 1970 (age 55)

Sport
- Sport: Swimming
- Strokes: Breaststroke

Ana Mendoza Velasco (born October 4, 1970) is a retired female breaststroke swimmer from Mexico. She represented her native country at the 1992 Summer Olympics in Barcelona, Spain. There, she ended up in 17th place (4:26.73) in the Women's 4 × 100 m Medley Relay event, alongside Heike Koerner (backstroke), Gabriela Gaja (butterfly), and Laura Sánchez (freestyle).
