= Churchill Area High School =

Coordinates: 40.43814°N 79.85363°W

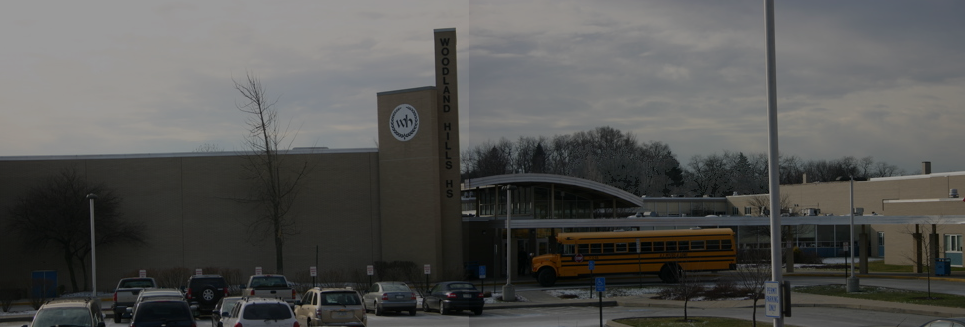

Location
- 2550 Greensburg Pike; Pittsburgh, Pennsylvania; United States

Information
- Type: Public
- Established: 1963
- Grades: 9-12

Churchill Area High School (CAHS) was a secondary school that taught students in grades 9-12 for the Churchill Area School District located in Churchill, Pennsylvania, a close suburb of Pittsburgh. In 1987, the school was merged with surrounding schools into Woodland Hills High School, at its present site, due to a 1981 court-ordered desegregation merger.

== Athletics ==
Churchill High School Hockey was a dynasty in the early days of the Western Pennsylvania Interscholastic Hockey League. The Chargers won the WPIHL League Championship in 1973, 1974, 1975, 1976, 1978, 1979, 1980, 1982, and 1983. Churchill was a Pennsylvania AAA State Finalist in 1975 and 1976 and a Pennsylvania AAA Champion in 1977 (Philadelphia) over Erie McDowell 6-5 and 1979 over Erie McDowell 10-9 [Two Game Series].

== Notable alumni ==
- John Clayton, 1972, American sports journalist
