= César Muciño =

Mexican cyclist

Personal information
- Born: 28 February 1972
- Died: 7 March 2003 (aged 31) Santiago de Querétaro, Mexico

Cycling career
- Sport: Cycling

César Muciño (28 February 1972 – 7 March 2003) was a Mexican cyclist. He competed in two events at the 1992 Summer Olympics.
