= Lourdes Olivera =

Mexican synchronised swimmer

Personal information
- Full name: Lourdes Olivera Martínez
- Nationality: Mexico
- Born: 16 December 1970 (age 55)

Sport
- Sport: Swimming
- Strokes: Synchronized swimming
Medal record
Synchronized swimming
Representing Mexico
Pan American Games
Silver medal – second place	1991 Havana	Women's duet
- Updated on 30 May 2015

Lourdes Olivera (born 16 December 1970) is a former synchronized swimmer from Mexico. She competed in both the women's solo and the women's duet competitions at the 1988 and 1992 Summer Olympics.
