= Heike Koerner =

Mexican swimmer (born 1973)

Personal information
- Full name: Heike Koerner Romo
- Nationality: Mexico
- Born: Mexico

Sport
- Sport: Swimming
- Strokes: Backstroke
Medal record
Women's swimming
Representing Mexico
Pan American Games
Bronze medal – third place	1991 Havana	4x200m freestyle
Bronze medal – third place	1991 Havana	4x100m medley

Heike Koerner Romo is a Mexican retired backstroke swimmer. She represented her native country at the 1992 Summer Olympics in Barcelona, Spain. There she ended up in 17th place (4:26.73) in the Women's 4 × 100 m Medley Relay event, alongside Ana Mendoza (breaststroke), Gabriela Gaja (butterfly), and Laura Sánchez (freestyle).
