= Jorge Mondragón (diver) =

Mexican diver

Personal information
- Born: October 30, 1962 (age 63) in México
Medal record
Men's diving
Representing Mexico
Pan American Games
Bronze medal – third place	1991 Havana	1m Springboard
Bronze medal – third place	1991 Havana	3m Springboard

Jorge Mondragón Vázquez (born October 30, 1962) is a Mexican retired diver. He competed in four consecutive Summer Olympics for his native country, starting in 1980. Mondragón won two bronze medals at the 1991 Pan American Games in Havana, Cuba.
