= Laura Sánchez (swimmer) =

Mexican swimmer (born 1972)

Personal information
- Full name: Laura Sánchez Rodríguez
- Nationality: Mexico
- Born: May 5, 1972 (age 54) Mexico

Sport
- Sport: Swimming
- Strokes: Freestyle
Medal record
Women's swimming
Representing Mexico
Pan American Games
Bronze medal – third place	1991 Havana	4x200m freestyle
Bronze medal – third place	1991 Havana	4x100m medley

Laura Sánchez Rodríguez (born May 5, 1972) is a retired female freestyle swimmer from Mexico. She represented her native country at the 1992 Summer Olympics in Barcelona, Spain. Her best result there was the 17th place (4:26.73) in the Women's 4 × 100 m Medley Relay event, alongside Heike Koerner (backstroke), Ana Mendoza (breaststroke), and Gabriela Gaja (butterfly).
