= Sonia Cárdeñas =

Mexican synchronized swimmer

Sonia Cárdenas
Personal information
- Full name: Sonia Cárdeñas Saavedra
- Nationality: Mexico
- Born: 22 February 1970 (age 56) mexico city
- Height: 5 ft 6 in (168 cm)
- Weight: 56 kg (123 lb)

Sport
- Sport: Swimming
- Strokes: Synchronized swimming
- Club: cuicacalli
Medal record
Synchronized swimming
Representing Mexico
Pan American Games
Silver medal – second place	1991 Havana	Women's duet
Bronze medal – third place	1991 Havana	Women's solo
- Updated on 8 February 2015

Sonia Cárdeñas (born 22 February 1970) is a former synchronized swimmer from Mexico. She competed in the women's solo at the 1988 and 1992 Summer Olympics.
