= Venezuela at the 1991 Pan American Games =

- IOC code: VEN
- NOC: Venezuelan Olympic Committee
- Website: www.cov.com.ve

in Havana 8–18 August 1991
- Medals Ranked 8th: Gold 4 Silver 14 Bronze 20 Total 38

Pan American Games appearances (overview)
- 1951; 1955; 1959; 1963; 1967; 1971; 1975; 1979; 1983; 1987; 1991; 1995; 1999; 2003; 2007; 2011; 2015; 2019; 2023

The 13th Pan American Games were held in Havana, Cuba from August 2 to August 18, 1991.

== Medals ==
=== Gold ===
===== Cycling =====
- Men's Individual Race (Road): Robinson Merchan

=== Silver ===
===== Boxing =====
- Men's Flyweight (– 51 kg): David Serradas
- Men's Light Heavyweight (– 81 kg): Raimundo Yant

===== Bowling =====
- Men's Masters: Luis Serfaty
- Men's Teams: Pedro Carreyo, Pedro Elias Cardozo, Luis Serfaty, and Francisco Carabano
- Women's Teams: Mirella Trasolini, Gisela Sánchez, Mariela Alarza, and Gabriela Bigai

===== Weightlifting =====
- Men's Flyweight (– 52 kg): Humberto Fuentes
- Men's Bantamweight (– 56 kg): José Farfán
- Men's Light-Heavyweight (– 82.5 kg): Julio César Luña

===== Wrestling =====
- Men's Greco-Roman (– 82 kg): Luis Rondón

=== Bronze ===
Shooting

- Free Pistol(Ven): Edgar Espinoza - Alejandro Muñoz - Bernardo Ocando

===== Boxing =====
- Men's Bantamweight (– 54 kg): Luis Ojeda
- Men's Welterweight (– 67 kg): José Guzman

===== Weightlifting =====
- Men's Lightweight (– 67.5 kg): José Medina
- Men's Middleweight (– 75 kg): Jorge Kassar

===== Wrestling =====
- Men's Freestyle (– 68 kg): José Díaz
- Men's Greco-Roman (– 62 kg): Winston Santos
- Men's Greco-Roman (– 74 kg): Néstor García

== Results by event ==
=== Basketball ===
==== Men's team competition ====
- Preliminary Round (Group A)

- Lost to United States (66-91)
- Defeated Cuba (84-70)
- Defeated Bahamas (96-81)
- Lost to Argentina (85-100)

- Quarterfinals

- Lost to Puerto Rico (104-111)

- Classification Matches

- 5th/8th place: Defeated Uruguay (85-79)
- 5th/6th place: Lost to Brazil (88-90) → 6th place → 10th place

- Team Roster

== See also ==
- Venezuela at the 1992 Summer Olympics
