= Cuba at the 1991 Pan American Games =

- IOC code: CUB
- NOC: Cuban Olympic Committee

in Havana 8–18 August 1991
- Medals Ranked 1st: Gold 140 Silver 62 Bronze 63 Total 265

Pan American Games appearances (overview)
- 1951; 1955; 1959; 1963; 1967; 1971; 1975; 1979; 1983; 1987; 1991; 1995; 1999; 2003; 2007; 2011; 2015; 2019; 2023

The 11th Pan American Games were held in Havana, Cuba from August 2 to August 18, 1991.

== Medals ==
=== Gold ===
===== Athletics =====
- Men's 400 metres: Roberto Hernández
- Men's 4×100 metres: Leandro Peñalver, Félix Stevens, Jorge Aguilera, and Joel Lamela
- Men's 4×400 metres: Héctor Herrera, Agustin Pavó, Jorge Valentin, and Lázaro Martínez
- Men's Marathon: Alberto Cuba
- Men's High Jump: Javier Sotomayor
- Men's Long Jump: Jaime Jefferson
- Men's Triple Jump: Yoelbi Quesada
- Men's Javelin: Ramón González
- Women's 100 metres: Liliana Allen
- Women's 200 metres: Liliana Allen
- Women's 400 metres: Ana Fidelia Quirot
- Women's 800 metres: Ana Fidelia Quirot
- Women's 100 m hurdles: Aliuska López
- Women's 400 m hurdles: Lency Montelier
- Women's High Jump: Ioamnet Quintero
- Women's Shot Put: Belsis Laza
- Women's Discus: Bárbara Hechevarría
- Women's Javelin: Dulce García

===== Boxing =====
- Men's Light Flyweight (– 48 kg): Rogelio Marcelo
- Men's Flyweight (– 51 kg): José Ramos
- Men's Bantamweight (– 54 kg): Enrique Carrion
- Men's Featherweight (– 57 kg): Arnaldo Mesa
- Men's Lightweight (– 60 kg): Julio González Valladares
- Men's Welterweight (– 67 kg): Juan Hernández Sierra
- Men's Light Middleweight (– 71 kg): Juan Carlos Lemus
- Men's Middleweight (– 75 kg): Ramón Garbey
- Men's Light Heavyweight (– 81 kg): Orestes Solano
- Men's Heavyweight (– 91 kg): Félix Savón
- Men's Super Heavyweight (+ 91 kg): Roberto Balado

===== Cycling =====
- Men's 4.000m Individual Pursuit (Track): Raúl Domínguez
- Men's 4.000m Team Pursuit (Track): Cuba
- Men's Team Time Trial (Road): Cuba

===== Diving =====
- Men's 10m Platform: Roger Ramírez

===== Gymnastics =====
- Men's All-Around: Eric López
- Men's Floor Exercise: Damian Merino
- Men's Parallel Bars: Eric López
- Men's Pommel Horse: José Tejada
- Men's Rings: Damian Merino
- Men's Horizontal Bar: Félix Aguilera
- Men's Vault: Eric López
- Men's Team: Cuba
- Women's Balance Beam: Leyanet González

===== Gymnastics =====
- Women's All-Around: Lourdes Medina
- Women's Rope: Lourdes Medina
- Women's Ball: Lourdes Medina
- Women's Clubs: Lourdes Medina
- Women's Group: Cuba

===== Handball =====
- Men's Team Competition: Cuba men's national handball team

===== Swimming =====
- Men's 200 m Breaststroke: Mario González

===== Water polo =====
- Men's Team Competition: Cuba men's national water polo team

===== Weightlifting =====
- Men's Flyweight (– 52 kg): Héctor Arzola
- Men's Bantamweight (– 56 kg): William Vargas
- Men's Featherweight (– 60 kg): Pedro Negrín
- Men's Lightweight (– 67.5 kg): Víctor Echevarría
- Men's Middleweight (– 75 kg): Pablo Lara
- Men's Light-Heavyweight (– 82.5 kg): Emilio Lara
- Men's Middle-Heavyweight (– 90 kg): Pedro Rodríguez
- Men's First-Heavyweight (– 100 kg): Omar Semanat
- Men's Heavyweight (– 110 kg): Ernesto Montoya
- Men's Super Heavyweight (+ 110 kg): Ernesto Aguero

===== Wrestling =====
- Men's Freestyle (– 48 kg): Aldo Martínez
- Men's Freestyle (– 52 kg): Carlos Varela
- Men's Freestyle (– 90 kg): Roberto Limonta
- Men's Greco-Roman (– 52 kg): Raúl Francisco Martínez
- Men's Greco-Roman (– 57 kg): Amadoris González
- Men's Greco-Roman (– 62 kg): Juan Luis Marén
- Men's Greco-Roman (– 74 kg): Abel Sarmiento
- Men's Greco-Roman (– 82 kg): Alfredo Linares
- Men's Greco-Roman (– 100 kg): Héctor Milian

=== Silver ===
===== Archery =====
- Men's Recurve (50 m): Miguel León

===== Athletics =====
- Men's 10,000 metres: Ángel Rodríguez
- Men's 110 m hurdles: Alexis Sánchez
- Men's Shot Put: Paul Ruiz
- Men's Discus: Roberto Moya
- Men's Decathlon: Eugenio Balanqué
- Women's Marathon: Maribel Durruty
- Women's 100 m hurdles: Odalys Adams
- Women's Long Jump: Eloína Echevarría
- Women's Discus: Hilda Ramos
- Women's 4×100 metres: Liliana Allen, Eusebia Riquelme, Julia Duporty, and Idalmis Bonne
- Women's 4×400 metres: Ana Fidelia Quirot, Nancy McLeón, Julia Duporty, and Odalmis Limonta

===== Basketball =====
- Women's Team Competition: Cuba women's national basketball team

===== Cycling =====
- Men's 1.000m Sprint (Track): D. Hiram
- Men's Individual Race (Road): Heriberto Rodríguez
- Women's Individual Race (Road): Odalys Toms
- Women's Team Time Trial (Road): Cuba

===== Diving =====
- Men's 1m Springboard: Abel Ramírez

===== Gymnastics =====
- Men's All-Around: José Tejada
- Men's Pommel Horse: Félix Aguilera
- Men's Rings: Eric López
- Men's Vault: Casimiro Suárez
- Women's Floor Exercise: Dayami Núñez
- Women's Team: Cuba

===== Gymnastics =====
- Women's Hoop: Lourdes Medina
- Women's Team: Cuba

===== Swimming =====
- Men's 100 m Backstroke: Rodolfo Falcón

===== Wrestling =====
- Men's Freestyle (– 57 kg): Alejandro Puerto
- Men's Freestyle (– 82 kg): Orlando Hernández
- Men's Greco-Roman (– 48 kg): Geovani Mato
- Men's Greco-Roman (– 68 kg): Cecilio Rodríguez
- Men's Greco-Roman (– 90 kg): Reynaldo Peña
- Men's Greco-Roman (– 130 kg): Wilfredo Pelayo

=== Bronze ===
===== Archery =====
- Men's Recurve Team: Cuba
- Women's Recurve Team: Cuba

===== Athletics =====
- Men's 200 metres: Félix Stevens
- Men's 10,000 metres: Juan Jesús Linares
- Men's Marathon: Radamés González
- Men's 3,000 m Steeplechase: Juan Ramón Conde
- Men's Long Jump: Iván Pedroso
- Men's Pole Vault: Ángel García
- Men's Discus: Juan Martínez Brito
- Men's Hammer: René Díaz
- Men's 50 km Walk: Edel Oliva
- Women's Marathon: Emperatriz Wilson
- Women's Javelin: Herminia Bouza
- Women's Heptathlon: Magalys García

===== Cycling =====
- Men's 4.000m Points Race (Track): Conrado Cabrera
- Women's 3.000m Individual Pursuit (Track): Tatiana Fernández

===== Diving =====
- Women's 1m Springboard: Mayte Garbey
- Women's 3m Springboard: Mayte Garbey
- Women's 10m Platform: María Carmuza

===== Football =====
- Men's Team Competition: Cuba national football team

===== Gymnastics =====
- Men's All-Around: Félix Aguilera
- Men's Parallel Bars: Félix Aguilera
- Women's Floor Exercise: Georgina Benítez
- Women's Balance Beam: Odaimis Jiménez

===== Gymnastics =====
- Women's Clubs: Yalili Fung

===== Swimming =====
- Men's 200 m Freestyle: René Sáez
- Men's 1500 m Freestyle: Pedro Carrío
- Men's 4 × 100 m Medley Relay: Cuba

===== Wrestling =====
- Men's Freestyle (– 62 kg): Lázaro Reinoso
- Men's Freestyle (– 74 kg): Alberto Rodríguez
- Men's Freestyle (– 100 kg): Ángel Anaya
- Men's Freestyle (– 130 kg): Domingo Mesa

== Results by event ==
=== Basketball ===
==== Men's team competition ====
- Preliminary Round (Group A)
  - Lost to United States (88-92)
  - Defeated Bahamas (99-90)
  - Lost to Venezuela (70-84)
  - Lost to Argentina (72-77)
- Quarterfinals
  - Defeated Brazil (96-92)
- Semifinals
  - Lost to Mexico (87-93)
- Bronze Medal Match
  - Lost to United States (74-93) → 4th place
- Team Roster

==== Women's team competition ====
- Preliminary Round
  - Defeated Argentina (93-47)
  - Defeated Canada (95-71)
  - Lost to Brazil (87-90)
  - Lost to United States (71-91)
- Semifinals
  - Defeated United States (86-81)
- Final
  - Lost to Brazil (76-97) → Silver Medal
- Team Roster

=== Volleyball ===
==== Men's team competition ====
- Preliminary Round
  - Defeated Puerto Rico (3-0)
  - Defeated Canada (3-0)
  - Defeated Argentina (3-0)
  - Defeated United States (3-0)
  - Defeated Brazil (3-1)
- Semifinals
  - Defeated Argentina (3-0)
- Final
  - Defeated Brazil (3-0) → Gold Medal
- Team Roster

== See also ==
- Cuba at the 1992 Summer Olympics
