= United States at the 1991 Pan American Games =

- IOC code: USA
- NOC: United States Olympic Committee
- Website: teamusa.org

in Havana 8–18 August 1991
- Medals Ranked 2nd: Gold 130 Silver 125 Bronze 97 Total 352

Pan American Games appearances (overview)
- 1951; 1955; 1959; 1963; 1967; 1971; 1975; 1979; 1983; 1987; 1991; 1995; 1999; 2003; 2007; 2011; 2015; 2019; 2023; 2027

The 13th Pan American Games were held in Havana, Cuba, from August 2 to August 18, 1991.

== Medals ==
=== Gold ===
===== Archery =====
- Men's Recurve: Darrell Pace
- Men's Recurve (30 m): Edwin Eliason
- Men's Recurve (50 m): Eric Brumlow
- Men's Recurve (70 m): Darrell Pace
- Men's Recurve (90 m): Eric Brumlow
- Men's Recurve Team: United States
- Women's Recurve: Denise Parker
- Women's Recurve (30 m): Denise Parker
- Women's Recurve (50 m): Janet Dykman
- Women's Recurve (60 m): Denise Parker
- Women's Recurve (70 m): Denise Parker
- Women's Recurve Team: United States

===== Athletics =====
- Men's 800 metres: Ocky Clark
- Men's 110 metres hurdles: Cletus Clark
- Men's Pole vault: Pat Manson
- Men's Discus throw: Anthony Washington
- Men's Hammer throw: Jim Driscoll
- Women's 1500 metres: Alisa Hill
- Women's 3000 metres: Sabrina Dornhoefer
- Women's Heptathlon: DeDee Nathan
- Women's 4 × 400 m relay: Natasha Kaiser-Brown, Tasha Downing, Maicel Malone, and Jearl Miles Clark

===== Boxing =====
- Men's Light Welterweight (– 63.5 kilograms): Stevie Johnston

===== Bowling =====
- Men's Masters: Patrick Healey
- Men's Teams: Steve Kloempken, Ralph Solan, Jon Juneau, and Patrick Healey
- Women's Teams: Maureen Webb, Julie Gardner, Mandy Wilson, and Lynda Norry

===== Cycling =====
- Women's 3.000m Individual Pursuit (Track): Kendra Kneeland
- Women's Individual Race (Road): Jeanne Golay
- Women's Team Time Trial (Road): United States

===== Diving =====
- Men's 1m Springboard: Mark Lenzi
- Men's 3m Springboard: Kent Ferguson
- Women's 1m Springboard: Jill Schlabach
- Women's 3m Springboard: Karen LaFace
- Women's 10m Platform: Eileen Richetelli

===== Football =====
- Men's Team Competition: United States men's national soccer team

===== Judo =====
- Men's Light Middleweight (– 78 kilograms): Jason Morris
- Men's Middleweight (– 86 kilograms): Joseph Wanang
- Women's Lightweight (– 56 kilograms): Kate Donahue

===== Sailing =====
- Men's Lightning: Matt Fisher, Steven Callison and Sean Fidler
- Men's Board: Ted Huang
- Women's 470: Amy Lawser and Susan Lawser
- Women's Board: Lanee Butler

=== Silver ===
===== Archery =====
- Men's Recurve: Edwin Eliason
- Men's Recurve (30 m): Jay Barrs
- Men's Recurve (70 m): Eric Brumlow
- Men's Recurve (90 m): Jay Barrs
- Women's Recurve: Jennifer O'Donnell
- Women's Recurve (30 m): Kitty Frazier
- Women's Recurve (50 m): Denise Parker
- Women's Recurve (60 m): Jennifer O'Donnell
- Women's Recurve (70 m): Kitty Frazier

===== Athletics =====
- Men's 100 metres: Andre Cason
- Men's 200 metres: Kevin Little
- Men's 800 metres: Terril Davis
- Men's 1500 metres: Bill Burke
- Men's 400 m hurdles: McClinton Neal
- Men's Long jump: Llewellyn Starks
- Men's Hammer throw: Jud Logan
- Men's Javelin throw: Mike Barnett
- Men's 4 × 400 m relay: Clarence Daniel, Quincy Watts, Jeff Reynolds, and Gabriel Luke
- Women's 100 metres: Chryste Gaines
- Women's 800 metres: Alisa Hill
- Women's Shot put: Connie Price-Smith
- Women's Javelin throw: Donna Mayhew
- Women's Heptathlon: Sharon Hanson
- Women's 10,000 m race walk: Debbi Lawrence

===== Boxing =====
- Men's Featherweight (– 57 kilograms): Kenneth Friday
- Men's Lightweight (– 60 kilograms): Patrice Brooks
- Men's Heavyweight (– 91 kilograms): Shannon Briggs

===== Bowling =====
- Women's Masters: Julie Gardner

===== Cycling =====
- Men's 1.000m Time Trial (Track): Erin Hartwell
- Men's 4.000m Individual Pursuit (Track): Dirk Copeland
- Men's 4.000m Team Pursuit (Track): United States
- Women's 1.000m Sprint (Track): Julie Gregg

===== Diving =====
- Men's 3m Springboard: Mark Bradshaw
- Women's 1m Springboard: Alison Malsch
- Women's 10m Platform: Alison Malsch

===== Gymnastics =====
- Women's Clubs: Naomi Hewitt-Couturier

===== Judo =====
- Men's Flyweight (– 56 kilograms): Clifton Sunada
- Men's Light Heavyweight (– 95 kilograms): Leo White
- Men's Open: Christophe Leininger
- Women's Flyweight (– 45 kilograms): Cathy Lee
- Women's Extra Lightweight (– 48 kilograms): Valerie Lafon
- Women's Half Middleweight (– 61 kilograms): Lynn Roethke

===== Sailing =====
- Men's Laser: Sam Kerner

===== Water polo =====
- Men's Team Competition: United States men's national water polo team

=== Bronze ===
===== Athletics =====
- Men's 100 metres: Jeff Williams
- Men's 400 metres: Jeff Reynolds
- Men's 110 m hurdles: Elbert Ellis
- Men's 400 m hurdles: Torrance Zellner
- Men's High jump: Hollis Conway
- Men's Triple jump: Jason Allegri
- Men's Shot put: C. J. Hunter
- Men's Decathlon: Sheldon Blockburger
- Women's 400 metres: Jearl Miles
- Women's 100 m hurdles: Arnita Myricks
- Women's 400 m hurdles: Tonja Buford-Bailey
- Women's High jump: Jan Wohlschlag
- Women's Long jump: Julie Bright
- Women's Shot put: Ramona Pagel
- Women's Discus throw: Lacy Barnes
- Women's 4 × 100 m relay: Chryste Gaines, Inger Miller, Donna Howard, and Arnita Myricks

===== Basketball =====
- Men's Team Competition: United States men's national basketball team
- Women's Team Competition: United States women's national basketball team

===== Boxing =====
- Men's Light Middleweight (– 71 kilograms): Ravea Springs
- Men's Middleweight (– 75 kilograms): Michael DeMoss

===== Bowling =====
- Men's Masters: Jon Juneau
- Women's Masters: Mandy Wilson

===== Cycling =====
- Men's Team Time Trial (Road): United States
- Women's 1.000m Sprint (Track): Jessica Grieco
- Women's Individual Race (Road): Janice Bolland

===== Diving =====
- Men's 10m Platform: Patrick Jeffrey

===== Gymnastics =====
- Women's Rope: Naomi Hewitt-Couturier
- Women's Ball: Jennifer Lovell
- Women's Team: United States

===== Handball =====
- Men's Team Competition: United States men's national handball team

===== Judo =====
- Men's Bantamweight (– 60 kilograms): Edward Liddie
- Men's Featherweight (– 65 kilograms): Jimmy Pedro
- Men's Lightweight (– 71 kilograms): Dan Hatano
- Men's Heavyweight (+ 95 kilograms): James Bacon
- Women's Middleweight (– 66 kilograms): Liliko Owasawara
- Women's Half Heavyweight (– 72 kilograms): Tammy Hensley

===== Sailing =====
- Men's 470: Morgan Larson and Paul Kerner
- Women's Laser: Karen Long
- Mixed Snipe: Peter Commette and Tarasa Davis

== Results by event ==
=== Basketball ===
==== Men's team competition ====
- Preliminary round (group A)

- Defeated Cuba (92-88)
- Defeated Venezuela (91-66)
- Defeated Argentina (87-81)
- Defeated Bahamas (116-58)

- Quarterfinals

- Defeated Uruguay (114-68)

- Semifinals

- Lost to Puerto Rico (68-73)

- Bronze Medal Match

- Defeated Cuba (93-74) → Bronze Medal

- Team roster

- Anthony Bennett
- Terry Dehere
- Grant Hill
- Thomas Hill
- James Jackson
- Adam Keefe
- Christian Laettner
- Eric Montross
- Tracy Murray
- Mike Peplowski
- Clarence Weatherspoon
- Walt Williams

- Head coach: Gene Keady (Purdue University)

==== Women's team competition ====
- Preliminary round robin

- Defeated Canada (93-47)
- Lost to Brazil (84-87)
- Defeated Argentina (97-40)
- Defeated Cuba (91-71)

- Semifinals

- Lost to Cuba (81-86)

- Bronze Medal Match

- Defeated Canada (92-61) → Bronze Medal

- Team roster

- Jennifer Azzi
- Medina Dixon
- Michelle Edwards
- Teresa Edwards
- Bridgette Gordon
- Sonja Henning
- Venus Lacy
- Andrea Lloyd
- Katrina McClain
- Andrea Stinson
- Regina Street
- Lynette Woodard

- Head coach: C. Vivian Stringer (University of Iowa)

=== Volleyball ===
==== Men's team competition ====
- Preliminary round

- Defeated Canada (3-1)
- Lost to Brazil (0-3)
- Defeated Puerto Rico (3-1)
- Lost to Cuba (0-3)
- Defeated Argentina (3-2)

- Semifinals

- Lost to Brazil (0-3)

- Bronze Medal Match

- Lost to Argentina (1-3) → Fourth place

- Team roster

== See also ==
- United States at the 1992 Summer Olympics
