= 1991 Pan American Games =

11th edition of the Pan American Games

XI Pan American Games
- Host: Havana, Cuba
- Nations: 39
- Athletes: 4,519
- Events: 331 in 33 sports
- Opening: August 2
- Closing: August 18
- Opened by: President Fidel Castro
- Cauldron lighter: Javier Sotomayor
- Main venue: Estadio Panamericano

Summer

Winter

The 1991 Pan American Games, officially known as the XI Pan American Games (Spanish: XI Juegos Panamericanos) and commonly known as Havana 1991 (Spanish: La Habana 1991), were held in Havana, Cuba from 2 to 18 August 1991. There were 4,519 athletes from 39 countries of the PASO community, with events in 33 different sports. The main stadium was the Estadio Panamericano, a multi-use stadium in Havana that holds 50,000 people.

== Host city election ==
Havana was the only non-withdrawn bid to host the 1991 Pan American Games. At the Pan American Games (ODEPA) Assembly, from November 12 to 14, 1986, in Bridgetown, Barbados, Mar del Plata withdrew its bid, leaving Havana as the winner to host the Games. London, Ontario, Canada also submitted a bid, but withdrew from the bid process due to the federal government prohibiting all funding from any international multi-sport events (aside from the 1988 Calgary Winter Olympics).

== Participating nations ==
- Antigua and Barbuda
- Netherlands Antilles
- Argentina
- Aruba
- Bahamas
- Barbados
- Belize
- Bermuda
- Bolivia
- Brazil
- British Virgin Islands
- Canada
- Cayman Islands
- Chile
- Colombia
- Costa Rica
- Cuba
- El Salvador
- Ecuador
- Grenada
- Guatemala
- Guyana
- Haiti
- Honduras
- Jamaica
- Mexico
- Nicaragua
- Panama
- Paraguay
- Peru
- Puerto Rico
- Dominican Republic
- Saint Vincent and the Grenadines
- Suriname
- Trinidad and Tobago
- Uruguay
- United States
- Venezuela
- Virgin Islands

== Sports ==
- Bowling made its debut at the Pan American Games
- Archery
- Athletics
- Baseball
- Basketball
- Bowling
- Boxing
- Canoeing
- Cycling
- Equestrian
- Fencing
- Field hockey
- Football
- Gymnastics
- Handball
- Judo
- Racquetball
- Roller skating
- Rowing
- Sailing
- Shooting
- Softball
- Swimming
- Synchronized swimming
- Table tennis
- Taekwondo
- Tennis
- Volleyball
- Water polo
- Weightlifting
- Wrestling

== Medal table ==
To sort this table by nation, total medal count, or any other column, click on the icon next to the column title. R

| Rank | Nation | Gold | Silver | Bronze | Total |
|---|---|---|---|---|---|
| 1 | Cuba | 140 | 62 | 63 | 265 |
| 2 | United States | 130 | 125 | 97 | 352 |
| 3 | Canada | 22 | 46 | 59 | 127 |
| 4 | Brazil | 21 | 21 | 37 | 79 |
| 5 | Mexico | 14 | 23 | 38 | 75 |
| Totals (5 entries) | | 327 | 277 | 294 | 898 |

== Mascot ==
Tocopan, the mascot of the games

The 1991 Games' mascot named Tocopan, was a combination of the country's national bird "Tocororo" and the first three letters of Panamerican.

| Preceded by Indianapolis | XI Pan American Games; Havana (1991) | Succeeded by Mar del Plata |
