= Campeonato Sudamericano de Clubes Campeones de Básquetbol =

Basketball cup competition in South America

Campeonato Sudamericano de Clubes Campeones de Básquetbol South American Basketball Championship of Champion Clubs
- Founded: 1946; 80 years ago
- Folded: 2008; 18 years ago
- Level on pyramid: 1st (1946–1992); 2nd (1993–1996, 2001–2007); 3rd (1996–2000, 2008)
- Last champions: (Uruguay) Biguá
- Most championships: (Brazil) Sírio (8 titles)

The Campeonato Sudamericano de Clubes Campeones de Básquetbol (Portuguese: Campeonato Sul-Americano de Clubes Campeões de Basquetebol, English: South American Basketball Championship of Champion Clubs), or Campeonato Sudamericano de Clubes de Básquetbol (South American Basketball Club Championship), was an international men's professional basketball cup competition that took place between South American sports clubs. It was originally organized by the South American Basketball Confederation (CONSUBASQUET), and later in 2008 by FIBA Americas. It was played annually between the league champions in each country, plus the winner of the previous edition.

== History ==
The South American Championship of Champion Clubs was founded in 1946, and it was the first international tournament in South America. It was played in a round robin format, usually hosted by a single city. From 1965 until 1987 the champion teams (and on many occasions the runners-up too) participated in the FIBA Intercontinental Cup represented South America. The competition was the first-tier and most important club competition in South America until 1996 when the FIBA South American League was launched, with a format that looked more of one of a European completion and not a single tournament.

The competition was finally discontinued in the year 2008, after the new top-tier Panamerican FIBA Americas League had been recently formed in December 2007 and meant that each South America country's top teams would qualify to the new league and not the FIBA South American League. Subsequently, the South American Championship lost its importance and it was abolished.

Legendary South American players like Oscar Schmidt, Marcelo Milanesio and Hector Campana have played in the competition.

=== South American Championship of Champion Clubs levels on the South American pyramid ===
- 1st-tier: (1946 – 1992)
- 2nd-tier: (1993 – 1996, 2001 – 2007)
- 3rd-tier: (1996 – 2000, 2008)

=== Names of the top-tier level South American / Latin American competition ===
- Consubasquet era: (1946–2007)
  - Campeonato Sudamericano de Clubes Campeones de Básquetbol (English: South American Basketball Championship of Champion Clubs): (1946–1992)
  - Campeonato Panamericano de Clubes de Básquetbol (English: Pan American Basketball Club Championship): (1993–2000)
  - Liga Sudamericana de Básquetbol (LSB) (English: South American Basketball League): (2001–2007)
- FIBA Americas era: (2007–present)
  - FIBA Americas League: (2007 – 2019)

== Format ==
The competition was hosted in one or more cities. In the first round, the eight clubs were divided in two groups of four teams each. The two best placed teams of each group advanced to the semifinals. In the semifinals, the first placed team of a group played against the other group's runner-up. The final was contested by the semifinal winners.

== Finals ==
Year	Winners	Finalists	Score
1946	(Uruguay) Olimpia Montevideo	(Argentina) Gimnasia y Esgrima (VdP)	
1953	(Brazil) Flamengo (Argentina) Selección de Santa Fé (Paraguay) Olimpia		Round robin
1956	Sporting Club Uruguay	(Argentina) Ateneo de la Juventud	Round robin
1958	Sporting Club Uruguay	(Argentina) San Lorenzo (Colombia) Selección Valley del Cauca	Round robin
1961	(Brazil) Sírio	(Paraguay) Olimpia	Round robin
1965	(Brazil) Corinthians	(Uruguay) Tabaré	
1966	(Brazil) Corinthians	(Ecuador) L.D. Estudantil	100-83, 109-84
1967	(Chile) Thomas Bata	(Uruguay) Welcome	65-61
1968	(Brazil) Sírio	(Uruguay) Welcome	
1969	(Brazil) Corinthians	(Ecuador) L.D. Estudantil	107-80
1970	(Brazil) Sírio	(Uruguay) Atenas	
1971	(Brazil) Sírio	(Chile) Sportiva Italiana	
1972	(Brazil) Sírio	(Uruguay) Olimpia	
1974	(Brazil) Franca	(Uruguay) CA Peñarol	
1975	(Brazil) Franca	(Argentina) Obras Sanitarias	
1977	(Brazil) Franca	(Brazil) Palmeiras	
1978	(Brazil) Sírio	(Brazil) Franca	
1979	(Brazil) Sírio	(Venezuela) Guaiqueríes de Margarita	81-80
1980	(Brazil) Franca	(Brazil) Sírio	75-74
1981	(Argentina) Ferro Carril Oeste	(Brazil) São José dos Campos	
1982	(Argentina) Ferro Carril Oeste	(Argentina) Obras Sanitarias	
1983	(Uruguay) Peñarol	(Brazil) Monte Líbano	
1984	(Brazil) Sírio	(Argentina) River Plate	
1985	(Brazil) Monte Líbano	(Argentina) San Andrés	108-85
1986	(Brazil) Monte Líbano	(Argentina) Ferro Carril Oeste	
1987	(Argentina) Ferro Carril Oeste	(Brazil) Monte Líbano	
1988	(Venezuela) Trotamundos	(Argentina) Atenas	Round robin
1989	(Venezuela) Trotamundos	(Uruguay) Biguá	103-101
1990	(Brazil) Franca	(Ecuador) San Pedro Pascual	88-85
1991	(Brazil) Franca	(Argentina) Atenas	94-72
1992	(Uruguay) Biguá	(Brazil) Franca	85-68
1993	(Argentina) Atenas	(Brazil) Franca	76-73
1994	(Argentina) Atenas	(Argentina) Olimpia (VT)	77-70
1995	(Brazil) Rio Claro	(Uruguay) Hebraica y Macabi	106-103
1996	(Argentina) Independiente	(Brazil) Rio Claro	84-78
1998	(Brazil) Vasco da Gama	(Uruguay) Atlético Welcome	98-84
1999	(Brazil) Vasco da Gama	(Brazil) Bauru	82-76
2000	(Venezuela) Trotamundos	(Brazil) Vasco da Gama	94-91
2001	(Venezuela) Delfines de Cabimas	(Venezuela) Espartanos de Margarita	78-73
2002	(Venezuela) Delfines de Miranda	(Chile) Valdivia	Round robin
2003	(Venezuela) Delfines de Miranda	(Argentina) Gimnasia y Esgrima (CR)	88-85
2004	(Argentina) Boca Juniors	(Venezuela) Delfines de Miranda	92-87
2005	(Argentina) Boca Juniors	(Brazil) Unitri/Uberlândia	85-75
2006	(Argentina) Boca Juniors	(Venezuela) Guaros de Lara	Round robin
2007	(Brazil) Minas Tênis	(Argentina) Boca Juniors	Round robin
2008	(Uruguay) Biguá	(Argentina) Libertad	Round robin

== Classification ==
=== Final tournament ===
South American 1st tier

Year	Host	Champion	Runner-up	Third	Fourth	Fifth	Sixth	Seventh	Eighth
1946	(Argentina) Buenos Aires	(Uruguay) Olimpia Montevideo	(Argentina) Gimnasia y Esgrima VdP (Villa del Parque)						
1953	(Chile) Antofagasta	(Brazil) Flamengo (Argentina) Selección de Santa Fé (Paraguay) Olimpia	-	-	(Uruguay) Paysandú	(Chile) Palestino	(Peru) Atlético Bilis	(Chile) Selección de Antofagasta	(Ecuador) LDU Quito
1956	(Uruguay) Montevideo	Sporting Club Uruguay	(Argentina) Ateneo de la Juventud	(Brazil) Selección of State of São Paulo					
1958	(Ecuador) Guayaquil	Sporting Club Uruguay	(Argentina) San Lorenzo (Colombia) Selección Valley del Cauca						
1961	(Paraguay) Asunción	(Brazil) Sírio	(Paraguay) Olimpia Assuncion	(Uruguay) Tabaré					
1965	(Brazil) São Paulo	(Brazil) Corinthians	(Uruguay) Tabaré						
1966	(Brazil) São Paulo	(Brazil) Corinthians	(Ecuador) L.D. Estudantil						
1967	(Chile) Antofagasta	(Chile) Thomas Bata	(Uruguay) Welcome	(Brazil) Botafogo					
1968	(Uruguay) Montevideo	(Brazil) Sírio	(Uruguay) Welcome	(Ecuador) L.D. Estudantil					
1969	(Ecuador) Guayaquil	(Brazil) Corinthians	(Ecuador) L.D. Estudantil	(Chile) Union Espanola	(Peru) Club de Regatas Lima	(Uruguay) Club Atlético Tabaré	(Argentina) Club Atletico Almagro	-	-
1970	(Chile) Punta Arenas	(Brazil) Sírio	(Uruguay) Atenas	(Chile) Sokol					
1971	(Peru) Arequipa	(Brazil) Sírio	(Chile) Sportiva Italiana	(Peru) Club de Regatas Lima		(Uruguay) Olimpia			
1972	(Brazil) São Paulo	(Brazil) Sírio	(Uruguay) Olimpia	(Paraguay) Olimpia Assuncion					
1974	(Uruguay) Mercedes, Salto, Montevideo	(Brazil) Franca	(Uruguay) CA Peñarol	(Chile) Thomas Bata					
1975	(Bolivia) La Paz	(Brazil) Franca	(Argentina) Obras Sanitarias	(Bolivia) Noris					
1977	(Argentina) Corrientes, Buenos Aires	(Brazil) Franca	(Brazil) Palmeiras	(Argentina) Obras Sanitarias		(Uruguay) Club Atlético Aguada			
1978	(Brazil) São Paulo	(Brazil) Sírio	(Brazil) Franca	(Venezuela) Guaiqueríes de Nueva Esparta					
1979	(Venezuela) Isla Margarita	(Brazil) Sírio	(Venezuela) Guaiqueríes de Margarita	(Argentina) Obras Sanitarias	(Uruguay) Peñarol	(Peru) Deportivo Field	(Paraguay) Olimpia Asuncion	(Bolivia) Club Deportivo Universitario de Sucre	-
1980	(Colombia) Cúcuta	(Brazil) Franca	(Brazil) Sírio	(Argentina) Gimnasia y Esgrima de La Plata			Sporting Club Uruguay		
1981	(Paraguay) Asunción, Encarnación	(Argentina) Ferro Carril Oeste	(Brazil) São José dos Campos			Sporting Club Uruguay			
1982	(Argentina) Buenos Aires, (Uruguay) Montevideo	(Argentina) Ferro Carril Oeste	(Argentina) Obras Sanitarias	(Brazil) Franca	(Uruguay) Club Atlético Bohemios				
1983	(Argentina) Buenos Aires, (Uruguay) Montevideo	(Uruguay) Peñarol	(Brazil) Monte Líbano	(Brazil) Franca					
1984	(Bolivia) Tarija, Sucre	(Brazil) Sírio	(Argentina) River Plate						
1985	(Brazil) Limeira, Jundiaí	(Brazil) Monte Líbano	(Argentina) San Andrés						
1986	(Argentina) Buenos Aires	(Brazil) Monte Líbano	(Argentina) Ferro Carril Oeste	(Argentina) Atenas					
1987	Valparaíso, Santiago de Chile	(Argentina) Ferro Carril Oeste	(Brazil) Monte Líbano			(Uruguay) Club Atlético Bohemios			
1988	(Venezuela) Caracas	(Venezuela) Trotamundos	(Argentina) Atenas						
1989	(Paraguay) Asunción	(Venezuela) Trotamundos	(Uruguay) Biguá	(Paraguay) Olimpia Assuncion					
1990	(Ecuador) Guayaquil	(Brazil) Ravelli/Franca	(Ecuador) San Pedro Pascual					(Uruguay) Biguá	
1991	(Brazil) Franca	(Brazil) Franca	(Argentina) Atenas	(Uruguay) Neptuno					
1992	(Uruguay) Montevideo	(Uruguay) Biguá	(Brazil) Franca	(Brazil) Cesp/Rio Claro	(Argentina) GEPU	(Chile) Deportivo Petrox	(Ecuador) C.N.D.	(Peru) Gimnasia y Esgrima Arequipa	(Bolivia) Ingavi
1993	(Argentina) Córdoba	(Argentina) Atenas	(Brazil) Franca	(Uruguay) Club Atlético Cordón			(Uruguay) Biguá		
1994	(Peru) Lima (23-29 April 1994)	(Argentina) Atenas	(Argentina) Olimpia (VT)	(Brazil) União Corinthians-RS					
1995	(Colombia) Bucaramanga (2-8 June 1995)	(Brazil) Rio Claro	(Uruguay) Hebraica y Macabi	(Argentina) Peñarol Mar del Plata	(Peru) Club de Regatas Lima	(Argentina) Atenas	(Colombia) Leopardos de Bucaramanga	(Chile) C.D. Universidad de Concepción	Banco Central del Ecuador
1996	(Chile) Concepción, Talca (12-21 May 1996)	(Argentina) Independiente	(Brazil) Rio Claro	(Chile) C.D. Universidad de Concepción	(Uruguay) Club Atlético Cordón	(Brazil) Dharma Franca	(Peru) Club de Regatas Lima	(Bolivia) Ingavi	-

South American 2nd tier

Year	Host	Champion	Runner-up	Third	Fourth	Fifth	Sixth	Seventh	Eighth
1998	(Bolivia) Tarija (1-6 December 1998)	(Brazil) Vasco da Gama	(Uruguay) Atlético Welcome	(Argentina) Independiente	(Argentina) Estudiantes de Bahía Blanca	(Chile) Provincial Osorno	(Bolivia) Ingavi	(Peru) Club de Regatas Lima	(Ecuador) Deportivo Guayas
1999	(Brazil) Rio de Janeiro	(Brazil) Vasco da Gama	(Brazil) Bauru/Tilibra	(Uruguay) Welcome	(Argentina) Independiente	(Chile) C.D. Universidad de Concepción	(Peru) Club de Regatas Lima	(Venezuela) Cocodrilos de Caracas	(Bolivia) Umpayu
2000	(Venezuela) Valencia (30 Aug - 3 Sept 2000)	(Venezuela) Trotamundos	(Brazil) Vasco da Gama	(Uruguay) Welcome	(Argentina) Estudiantes de Olavarría	(Colombia) Piratas de Bogota	(Chile) Provincial Osorno	(Peru) Club de Regatas Lima	(Ecuador) Club ESPE
2001	(Venezuela) Isla Margarita (18-22 October 2001)	(Venezuela) Delfines de Cabimas	(Venezuela) Espartanos de Margarita	(Argentina) Estudiantes de Olavarría	(Brazil) Unitri/Uberlândia	(Uruguay) Defensor Sporting	(Colombia) Paisas de Medellín	(Ecuador) UTE	-
2002	(Chile) Valdivia (20-27 October 2002)	(Venezuela) Delfines de Miranda	(Chile) Valdivia			(Paraguay) Deportivo San José	(Uruguay) Defensor Sporting	(Colombia) Paisas de Medellín	(Ecuador) Mavort
2003	(Venezuela) Maracaibo	(Venezuela) Delfines de Miranda	(Argentina) Gimnasia y Esgrima (CR)	(Venezuela) Duros de Lara	(Venezuela) Tanqueros del Zulia	(Brazil) Ribeirao Prato	(Paraguay) Deportivo San José	(Colombia) Paisas de Medellín	(Ecuador) Club ESPE
2004	(Paraguay) Asunción (7-11 September 2004)	(Argentina) Boca Juniors	(Venezuela) Delfines de Miranda	(Paraguay) Deportivo San José	(Brazil) Unitri/Uberlândia	(Chile) Provincial Llanquihue	(Venezuela) Guacharos Monagas	(Colombia) Piratas de Bogota	(Peru) Club de Regatas Lima
2005	(Argentina) Rafaela (20-24 September 2005)	(Argentina) Boca Juniors	(Brazil) Unitri/Uberlândia	(Argentina) Libertad	(Argentina) Ben Hur	(Uruguay) Salto	(Ecuador) Club ESPE	(Paraguay) Deportivo San José	(Venezuela) Delfines de Miranda
2006	(Venezuela) Barquisimeto (18-22 October 2006)	(Argentina) Boca Juniors	(Venezuela) Guaros de Lara	(Brazil) UniCEUB	(Argentina) Gimnasia y Esgrima de Comodoro Rivadavia	(Paraguay) Deportivo San José	(Chile) Universidad Católica	-	-
2007	(Brazil) Brasília (31 Oct - 4 Nov 2007)	(Brazil) Minas Tênis	(Argentina) Boca Juniors	(Argentina) Peñarol Mar del Plata	(Venezuela) Duros de Lara	(Brazil) UniCEUB	(Paraguay) Deportivo San José	-	-

South American 3d tier

Year	Host	Champion	Runner-up	Third	Fourth	Fifth	Sixth
2008	(Ecuador) Guayaquil (28 Oct - 1 Nov 2008)	(Uruguay) Biguá	(Argentina) Libertad	(Brazil) Joinville	(Brazil) Minas Tênis	(Chile) Liceo Mixto	(Ecuador) Barcelona S.C.

== Performances ==
=== Titles by club ===
Titles	Club	Years won
8	(Brazil) Sírio	1961, 1968, 1970, 1971, 1972, 1978, 1979, 1984
6	(Brazil) Franca	1974, 1975, 1977, 1980, 1990, 1991
3	(Brazil) Corinthians	1965, 1966, 1969
3	(Argentina) Ferro Carril Oeste	1981, 1982, 1987
3	(Venezuela) Trotamundos	1988, 1989, 2000
3	(Venezuela) Delfines de Miranda	2001, 2002, 2003
3	(Argentina) Boca Juniors	2004, 2005, 2006
2	(Uruguay) Defensor	1956, 1958
2	(Brazil) Monte Líbano	1985, 1986
2	(Uruguay) Biguá	1992, 2008
2	(Argentina) Atenas	1993, 1994
2	(Brazil) Vasco da Gama	1998, 1999
1	(Uruguay) Olimpia	1946
1	(Brazil) Flamengo	1953
1	(Argentina) Selección de Santa Fé	1953
1	(Paraguay) Olimpia	1953
1	(Chile) Thomas Bata	1967
1	(Uruguay) Peñarol	1983
1	(Brazil) Rio Claro	1995
1	(Argentina) Independiente	1996
1	(Brazil) Minas	2007

=== Titles by country ===
Titles	Country
24	Brazil
10	Argentina
6	Uruguay
6	Venezuela
1	Paraguay
1	Chile

== Statistical leaders per season ==
=== Topscorers per tournament ===
1946: Roberto Lovera (Club Atlético Olimpia)
1953: (Paraguay) Aristides Isusi (Club Olimpia) 140 pts
1958: Héctor Costa (Sporting Club Uruguay) 124 pts
1966: (Brazil) Wlamir Marques (Corinthians)
1969: (Brazil) Wlamir Marques (Corinthians) 144 pts
1989: (United States) Al Smith (Trotamundos B.B.C.)
1992: Gustavo Szczygielski (Bigua) 104 pts
1995: (United States) Billy Law (Rio Claro)
1998: (United States) Charles Byrd (Vasco da Gama) 161 pts
1999: (United States) Charles Byrd (Vasco da Gama) 160 pts
2000: (Venezuela) Victor Diaz (Trotamundos B.B.C.) 99 pts
2001: (Venezuela) Víctor Díaz (Delfines)
2003: (United States) Jervaughn Scales (Gimnasia) 115 pts
2004: (Argentina) Paolo Quinteros (Boca Juniors) 138 pts
2006: (United States) Maurice Spillers (Boca Juniors) 95 pts (19.0 pg)
2007: (Brazil) Evandro Fernandes Pinto (Minas Tenis Clube) 113 pts (22.6 pg)
2008: Leandro Garcia Morales (Bigua) 94 pts (23.5 pg)

=== Most rebounds ===
2003: (United States) Nick Davis (Duros de Lara) 40
2004: (United States) Kenny Whitehead (Club de Regatas Lima)
2006: (Argentina) Martín Leiva (Boca Juniors) 4.8
2007: (Brazil) Charles Márcio Lopes (UniCEUB) 9.8 (pg)
2008: (Brazil) Shilton Dos Santos (Joinville) 8.8 (pg)

=== Most assists ===
2003: (Brazil) Nezinho Dos Santos (Ribeirão Preto) 28
2006: (Argentina) Pablo Moldú (Boca Juniors) 4.2
2007: (Argentina) Facundo Sucatzky (Tenis Minas) 5.0 (pg)
2008: (Argentina) Facundo Sucatzky (Tenis Minas) 11.6 (pg)

=== Index rating ===
2007: (Argentina) Facundo Sucatzky (Tenis Minas) 23.0 pts
2008: (Uruguay) Leandro Garcia Morales (Bigua) 19.3 pts

== South American Cup Finals Top Scorers ==
The competition was normally held in a round robin format, but on a few occasions there were single finals. On many occasions the Final was considered the decider match of the last round.

Season	Top Scorer	Club	Points Scored
1966	(Brazil) Wlamir Marques	(Brazil) Corinthians	43
1989	(United States) Al Smith	(Venezuela) Trotamundos	48
1994	(Argentina) Marcelo Milanesio	(Argentina) Atenas Cordoba	
1995	(United States) Billy Law	(Brazil) Rio Claro	
1998	(United States) Charles Byrd	(Brazil) Vasco da Gama	32
1999	(United States) Charles Byrd	(Brazil) Vasco da Gama	20
2000	(Dominican Republic) José Vargas	(Brazil) Vasco da Gama	26
2001	(Venezuela) Richard Lugo	(Venezuela) Delfines de Miranda	23
2002	(United States) Ruben Nembhard	(Venezuela) Delfines de Miranda	22
2003	(United States) Jervaughn Scales	(Argentina) Gimnasia	25
2004	(Argentina) Paolo Quinteros	(Argentina) Boca Juniors	28
2005	(Brazil) Marcelinho Machado	(Brazil) Uberlandia	29
2006	(United States) Maurice Spillers	(Argentina) Boca Juniors	30+

== MVP per tournament ==
Season	Player	Club
1989	(United States) Sam Shepherd	(Venezuela) Trotamundos
1990	(United States) Rocky Smith	(Brazil) Ravelli/Franca
1992	(Uruguay) Gustavo Szczygielski	(Uruguay) Bigua
1998	(United States) Charles Byrd	(Brazil) Vasco da Gama
1999	(United States) Charles Byrd	(Brazil) Vasco da Gama
2000	(Venezuela) Oscar Torres	(Venezuela) Trotamundos
2001	(United States) Anthony Smith	(Venezuela) Espartanos
2003	(Venezuela) Victor David Díaz	(Venezuela) Delfines de Miranda
2004	(Argentina) Paolo Quinteros	(Argentina) Boca Juniors
2006	(United States) Maurice Spillers	(Argentina) Boca Juniors
2008	(Uruguay) Leandro Garcia Morales	(Uruguay) Bigua

== Winning rosters ==
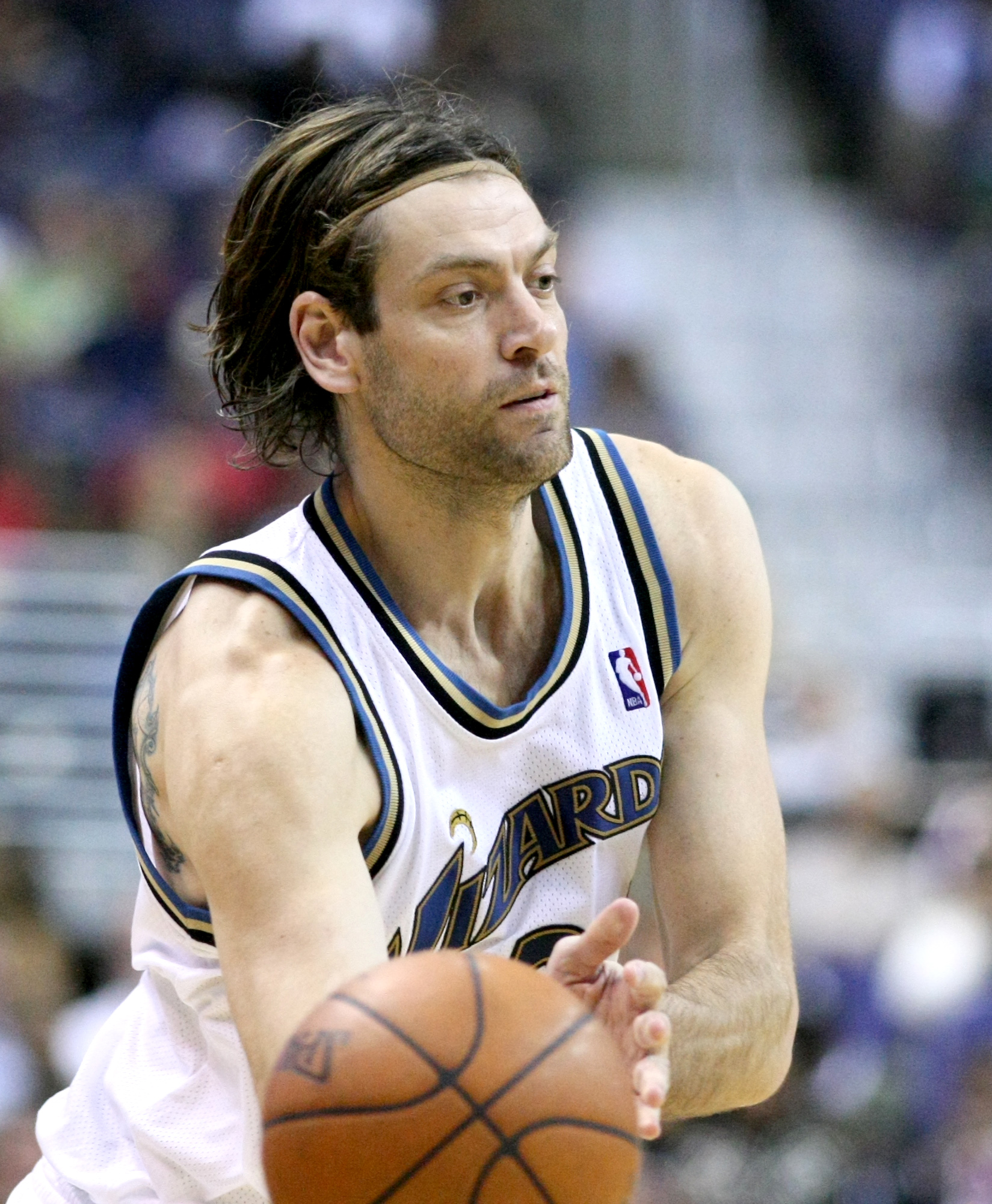
Fabricio Oberto helped Atenas Cordoba win the 1994 South American Championship.

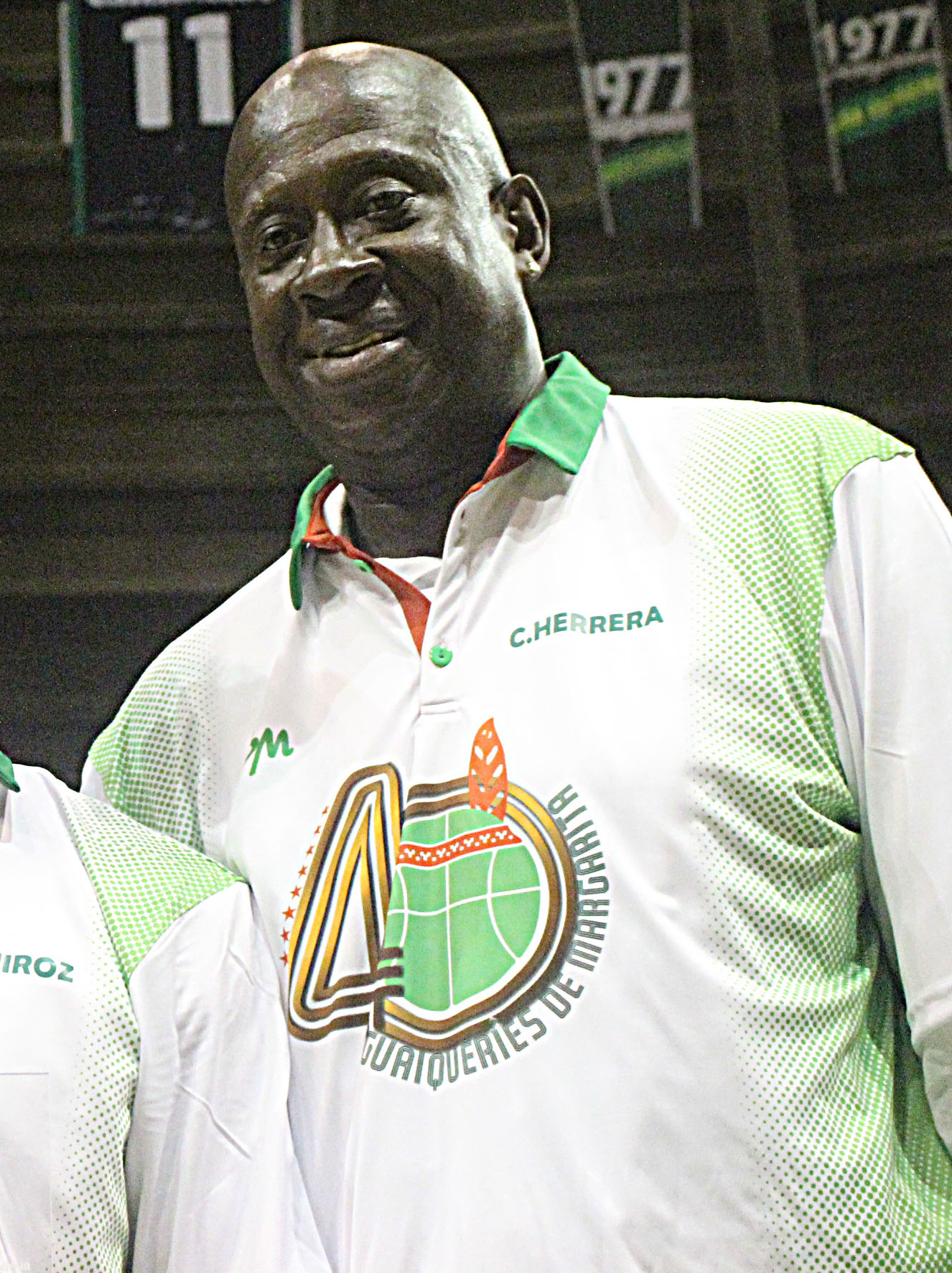
NBA champion Carl Herrera won the trophy 3 times (2000, 2002, 2003) after the competition was branded as 2nd tier.

=== 1950s ===
- 1958 Sporting Club Uruguay

Héctor Costa (c), Adolfo Lubnicki, Enrique Baliño, José Llera, Jorge Pagani, Zafiro Antúnez, Hugo Vázquez, Luciano Aranzadi, Tydeo Irigoyen, Carlos Peinado, Nelson Chelle, Carlos Roselló, José Otonello. Coach: Héctor López Reboledo

=== 1960s ===
- 1966 (Brazil) Corinthians

José Edvar Simões, Pedro Yves, Bira, Rene, Wlamir Marques, Rosa Branca. Coach: Moacyr Daiuto

- 1967 (Chile) Thomas Bata

Juan Lishnowski, Josè Pleticovic, Luis Lamig, Francisco Valenzuela, Francisco Guerrero, Juan Encina, Luis Garcìa, Enrique Espinoza, Ivan Torres, Luis Barrera.

- 1969 (Brazil) Corinthians

Ortiz, Ferraz, Bernardo, Felipe, Bira, Rene, Peninha, Amaury Pasos, Wlamir Marques, Renzo, Fernando, Rosa Branca. Coach: Moacyr Daiuto

=== 1970s ===
- 1974 (Brazil) Franca

Hélio Rubens Garcia, Fransérgio, Fausto Giannechini, Gilson Trindade, Robertão -Betão, Gustavo Aguirre, Carlão, Carrarinho, Carraro. Coach: Pedroca.

- 1975 (Brazil) Franca

Hélio Rubens Garcia, Fransérgio, Fausto Giannechini, Gilson Trindade, Robertão - Betão, Gustavo Aguirre, Carlão, Carrarinho, Carraro.Coach: Pedroca.

=== 1980s ===
- 1980 (Brazil) Franca

Hélio Rubens Garcia, Fransérgio, Fausto Giannechini, Guerrinha, Robertão - Tom Zé. Coach: Pedroca

- 1981 (Argentina) FCO

Miguel Cortijo, Bill Terry, Luis Oroño, Javier Maretto, Jorge Martin, Jose Cotic, Luis Gonzalez, George Berry, Hugo Francisco Belli. Coach: Leon Najnudel

- 1982 (Brazil) FCO

Miguel Cortijo, Bill Terry, Luis Oroño, Harthorne Wingo, Luis Chuzo Gonzalez, Alejandro Meschini, Gabriel Darrás, Sebastian Uranga. Coach: Leon Najnudel

- 1983 (Uruguay) Penarol Montevideo

Daniel Wenzel, Hebert Núñez, Álvaro Tito, Juan Andrés Blanc, Gustavo Tito, Joe McColl, Pedro Malet, Alejandro Trias, Oscar Soto, Lincoln Pérez, Bo Jackson y Jimmy Wells. Coach: Victor Hugo Berardi.

- 1985 (Brazil) CA Monte Libano

Cadum, Marcel de Souza, Maury de Souza, Pipoca, Israel Andrade, Bob Miservicius, Paraguai Pisérgio, António Valliengo Toninho. Coach: José Edvar Simões

- 1986 (Brazil) CA Monte Libano

Ricardo Cardoso Cadum, Marcel de Souza, Maury de Souza, Pipoca, Israel Andrade, António Valliengo Toninho, André Ernesto Stoffel, Cadum, Zé Mauro, Antonio Valliengo Toninho. Coach: José Edvar Simões

- 1987 (Argentina) FCO

Miguel Cortijo, Luis Oroño, Jimmy Gilbert, Horacio López, Luis Chuzo Gonzalez, Gabriel Darrás, Orlando Tourn, Diego Maggi. Coach: Luis Martinez

- 1988 (Venezuela) Trotamundos

Al Smith, Sam Shepherd, Jerry Corcoram, David Simmons, Alfredo Díaz, Randall Rodríguez, Luís Jiménez, Yván Olivares, Calos Dalrrimple, Allison García, Gustavo Borromé, Douglas Barinas, Efraín Ponce, Alexander Nelcha, Manuel Jiménez, Ernesto Rivero. Coach: Osiris Duquela

- 1989 (Venezuela) Trotamundos

Al Smith, Sam Shepherd, Carlos Dalrrimple, César Ramos, Randall Rodríguez, Roldman Toro, Rostyn González, Luís Jiménez, Elías Romero, Manuel Jiménez, Allison García, Yván Olivares, Nicolás Castillo, Luis Gómez, Alexander Nelcha, Elsren Jackson. Coach: Pedro “Camagüey” Espinoza

=== 1990s ===
- 1990 (Brazil) Franca

Guerrinha, Fernando Minucci, Rocky Smith, Patrick Reynolds, Paulão - Evandro, Janjão. Coach: Hélio Rubens Garcia

- 1991 (Brazil) Franca

Guerrinha, Fernando Minucci, Rocky Smith, Morgan Taylor, Paulão - Evandro, Janjão. Coach: Hélio Rubens Garcia

- 1992 (Uruguay) Bigua

Horacio Perdomo, Gustavo Szczygielski, Luis Pierri, Medrick, Nebel, Toto, Luis Eduardo Larrosa, Enrique Cattivelli, Mark Stevenson, Oldham, Enrique Tucuna, Camilo Castro, Coach: Victor Hugo Berardi

- 1993 (Argentina) Asociación Deportiva Atenas

Luis Villar, Marcelo Milanesio, Jervis Cole, Luis Villar, Esteban De la Fuente, Wallace Bryant, Ernesto Michel, Luis Gonzalez, Marcelo Milanesio, Diego Osella, Wallace Bryant, Pedro Casermeiro, Carlos Colla. Coach: Walter Garrone (es)

- 1994 (Argentina) Asociación Deportiva Atenas

Luis Villar, Marcelo Milanesio, Mario Milanesio, Esteban De la Fuente, Luis Villar, Pedro Casermeiro, Fabricio Oberto, Marcos Nóbile, Diego Osella, Fabricio Oberto, Bruno Lábaque, Leandro Palladino, Ben Gillery. Coach: Rubén Magnano

- 1995 (Brazil) Rio Claro

Valtinho da Silva, Scooby Tec, Taddei Cury, Billy Law, Robyn Davis, Paulao, Antonio Santana, Luiz Felipe Azevedo, Almir, Gibi, Daniel Ricardo Probst, Efigenio, Seu Agostinho, Walter Rosamila, Gustavo. Coach: Ze Boquinha (pt)

- 1996 (Argentina) Independence de General Pico

Miguel Cortijo, Facundo Sucatzky, Jervis Cole, Melvin Johnson, Pelado Sanchez, Sergio Aispurúa (es), Raul Merlo (es), Alberto Falasconi, Luis Chuzo Gonzalez, Pablo Cariddi. Coach: Mario Guzman

- 1998 (Brazil) Vasco da Gama

Charles Byrd, Jose Mingao, Demétrius Conrado Ferraciú, Rogerio Klafke, Janjao, Ricardinho dos Santos, Jose Vargas, Paulinho, Carlao, Dial, Ze Carlos.

- 1999 (Brazil) Vasco da Gama

Charles Byrd, Helio Rubens Garcia Filho, Jose Mingao, Demétrius Conrado Ferraciú, Janjao, Rogerio Klafke, Ricardinho dos Santos, Jose Vargas. Coach: Flor Meléndez

=== 2000s ===
- 2000 (Venezuela) Trotamundos

Oscar Torres, Victor David Diaz, Carl Herrera, Sean Colson, Art Long, C.Estaba, A.Garcia, R.Osorio, V.Heredia, P.Barrios

- 2002 (Venezuela) Delfines de Miranda

Victor David Diaz, Carl Herrera, Ruben Nembhard, Nate Johnston, Ludwing Irazabal, Jose Mora, Alejandro Quiroz, Rafael Guevara, Luis Julio, Pablo Machado, Armando Becker. Coach: Francisco "Paco" Diez

- 2003 (Venezuela) Delfines de Miranda

Carl Herrera, Derrick Brown, Victor David Diaz, Alejandro Quiroz, Angel Caballero, Richard Lugo.

- 2004 (Argentina) Boca Juniors

Rotta Juan Pablo, Leonardo Peralta, Fernando Malara, Carlos Matías Sanders, Lucas Ortiz, Juan Sartorelli, Martin Leiva, Sebastian Festa, Paolo Quinteros, Raheim Brown, Alejandro Burgos. Coach: Sergio Hernandez

- 2005 (Argentina) Boca Juniors

Carlos Matías Sanders, Sherell Ford Lucas Ortiz, Martin Leiva, Paolo Quinteros, Diego Alba, Fernando Malara, Luis Cequeira, Carlos Strong, Fernando Funes, Leonardo Peralta. Coach: Carlos Duro (es)

- 2006 (Argentina) Boca Juniors

Julian Aprea, Raymundo Legaria, Lucas Ortiz, Martin Miner, Matias Fioretti, Luis Cequeira, Leonardo Gutierrez, Martin Leiva, Gustavo Orona, Lazaro Borrell, Rodrigo Sanchez, Maurice Spillers. Coach: Eduardo Cadillac (es)

- 2007 (Brazil) Minas Tenis Clube

Soro, Maozao, Facundo Sucatzky, Wanderson Trigueiro, Evandro Fernandes Pinto, Andre, Luiz Felipe, Marcio, Romario Souza, Mauro, Guilherme, Sean Knitter. Coach: Flavio Davis Furtado

- 2008 (Uruguay) Biguá

Leandro Garcia Morales, Kevin Young, Duke Freeman-McKarney, Santiago Vidal, Nathan Guillermo, Martín Osimani, Juan Cambon, Joaquin Osimani, Gonzalo Meira, Gonzalo Carvidon, Juan Jose Rovira, Mathias Calfani. Coach: Néstor Garcia

== See also ==
- List of basketball champions of the Americas
- FIBA Americas League
- Pan American Championship
- FIBA South American League

== Sources ==
- RODRIGO GARCIA BASKETBALL Histórico de Campeonato 1946-2008
- TORNEOS CONTINENTALES DE CLUBES
- FIBA Archive 95-08
- 1990 edition
- 1983 edition
- 1958 edition
- History
- Basketball Uruguano
- Trotamundos: history
- Bigua history
