= 1992 Tournament of the Americas squads =

This article displays the rosters for the participating teams at the 1992 Tournament of the Americas played in Portland, Oregon, United States from June 27 to July 5, 1992.

== Group A ==
=== Argentina ===
- 4 Luis Villar
- 5 Héctor Campana
- 6 Fabián Tourn
- 7 Esteban de la Fuente
- 8 Hernán Montenegro
- 9 Marcelo Milanesio
- 10 Juan Espil
- 11 Miguel Cortijo
- 12 Sebastián Uranga
- 13 Rubén Scolari
- 14 Esteban Pérez
- 15 Diego Osella

- Head coach: (Argentina) Walter Garrone

=== Canada ===
- 4 Trevor Williams
- 5 Ronn McMahon
- 6 J. D. Jackson
- 7 David Turcotte
- 8 Al Kristmanson
- 9 Leo Rautins
- 10 Bill Wennington
- 11 Martin Keane
- 12 Mike Smrek
- 13 Greg Wiltjer
- 14 Phil Ohl
- 15 Gerald Kazanowski

- Head coach: (Canada) Ken Shields

=== Cuba ===
- 4 Ángel Caballero
- 5 Yudi Abreu
- 6 Félix Morales
- 7 Lázaro Negrin
- 8 José Luis Díaz
- 9 Eliécer Rojas
- 10 Leonardo Pérez
- 11 Lazaro Borrell
- 12 Alberto Maturell
- 13 Juan Caballero
- 14 Richard Matienzo
- 15 Andrés Guibert

- Head coach: (Cuba) Miguel Calderón Gómez

=== Panama ===
- 4 Enrique Grenald
- 5 Eddy Chávez
- 6 Reggie Grenald
- 7 Ricardo Chávez
- 8 Guillermo Myers
- 9 Leroy Jackson
- 10 Mario Gálvez
- 11 Rolando Frazer
- 12 Ricardo Grant
- 13 Carlos Rockshead
- 14 Stuart Gray
- 15 Mario Butler

- Head coach: (United States) Jim Baron

=== United States ===
- 4 Christian Laettner
- 5 David Robinson
- 6 Patrick Ewing
- 7 Larry Bird
- 8 Scottie Pippen
- 9 Michael Jordan
- 10 Clyde Drexler
- 11 Karl Malone
- 12 John Stockton
- 13 Chris Mullin
- 14 Charles Barkley
- 15 Magic Johnson

- Head coach: (United States) Chuck Daly

== Group B ==
=== Brazil ===
- 4 Paulinho
- 5 Guerrinha
- 6 Gerson
- 7 Pipoka
- 8 Rolando
- 9 Cadum
- 10 Maury
- 11 Marcel
- 12 Josuel
- 13 Minuci
- 14 Oscar
- 15 Israel

- Head coach: (Brazil) José Medalha

=== Mexico ===
- 4 Óscar Castellanos
- 5 Antonio Reyes
- 6 Erick Martínez
- 7 Roberto González
- 8 Enrique González
- 9 Rafael Willis
- 10 Alberto Martínez
- 11 Luis López
- 12 Arturo Sánchez
- 13 José Luis Arroyos
- 14 Octavio Robles
- 15 Arturo Montes

- Head coach: (Mexico) Arturo Guerrero

=== Puerto Rico ===
- 4 José Ortiz
- 5 Federico López
- 6 Raymond Gause
- 7 Edwin Pellot
- 8 Jerome Mincy
- 9 James Carter
- 10 Javier Antonio Colón
- 11 Ramón Rivas
- 12 Mario Morales
- 13 Edgar de León
- 14 Eddie Casiano
- 15 Richard Soto

- Head coach: (Puerto Rico) Raymond Dalmau

=== Uruguay ===
- 4 Horacio López
- 5 Luis Larrosa
- 6 Luis Pierri
- 7 Hébert Núñez
- 8 Alain Mayor
- 9 Horacio Perdomo
- 10 Marcelo Capalbo
- 11 Álvaro Tito
- 12 Gustavo Szczygielski
- 13 Adolfo Medrick
- 14 Enrique Tucuna
- 15 Marcelo Sánchez

- Head coach: (Uruguay) Víctor Hugo Berardi

=== Venezuela ===
- 4 Víctor David Díaz
- 5 David Díaz
- 6 Melquíades Jaramillo
- 7 Nelson Solórzano
- 8 Rostyn González
- 9 Luis Jiménez
- 10 Sam Shepherd
- 11 Carl Herrera
- 12 Armando Palacios
- 13 Gabriel Estaba
- 14 Iván Olivares
- 15 Alexander Nelcha

- Head coach: (Puerto Rico) Julio Toro

== Bibliography ==
- Mexico 2015 FIBA Americas Championship Guía Histórica 1980–2015 (in Spanish). FIBA. 2015. p. 45–50.
