= 1993 Tournament of the Americas squads =

This article displays the rosters for the participating teams at the 1993 Tournament of the Americas played in San Juan, Puerto Rico from August 28 to September 5, 1993.

== Group A ==
=== Brazil ===
- 4 Chuí
- 5 Ratto
- 6 Olívia
- 7 Pipoka
- 8 Ferreira
- 9 Demétrius
- 10 Maury
- 11 Minuci
- 12 Josuel
- 13 Janjão
- 14 Rogério
- 15 Luizão

- Head coach: (Brazil) Ênio Ângelo Vecchi

=== Dominican Republic ===
- 4 Derek Baker
- 5 Víctor Hansen
- 6 Evaristo Pérez Carrión
- 7 José Molina
- 8 Víctor Chacón
- 9 José Mercedes
- 10 Mario Regús
- 11 Vinicio Muñoz
- 12 Tito Horford
- 13 Felipe López
- 14 Mauricio Espinal
- 15 José Vargas

- Head coach: (Dominican Republic) Héctor Báez

=== Panama ===
- 4 Anthony Fiss
- 5 Ricardo Yearwood
- 6 Ricardo Grant
- 7 Eliécer Ellis Jr.
- 8 Guillermo Myers
- 9 Leroy Jackson
- 10 Mario Gálvez
- 11 Rolando Frazer
- 12 Amado Martínez
- 13 Carlos Rockshead
- 14 Rubén Garcés
- 15 Mario Butler

- Head coach: (Puerto Rico) Flor Meléndez

=== United States ===
- 4 Tony White
- 5 Kelsey Weems
- 6 Craig Neal
- 7 Eldridge Recasner
- 8 Rod Mason
- 9 Reggie Jordan
- 10 Harold Ellis
- 11 Chris Jent
- 12 Tony Martin
- 13 Brian Rahilly
- 14 Bobby Martin
- 15 Tom Copa

- Head coach: (United States) Mike Thibault

=== Venezuela ===
- 4 Víctor David Díaz
- 5 César Portillo
- 6 Armando Becker
- 7 Nelson Solórzano
- 8 Rostyn González
- 9 Eduardo Crespo
- 10 Sam Shepherd
- 11 Richard Medina
- 12 Víctor González
- 13 Gabriel Estaba
- 14 Iván Olivares
- 15 Omar Walcott

- Head coach: (Puerto Rico) Julio Toro

== Group B ==
=== Argentina ===
- 4 Eduardo Dominé
- 5 Fabián Tourn
- 6 Luis Villar
- 7 Daniel Farabello
- 8 Carlos Romano
- 9 Marcelo Milanesio
- 10 Juan Espil
- 11 Diego Osella
- 12 Sebastián Uranga
- 13 Hernán Montenegro
- 14 Esteban Pérez
- 15 Rubén Wolkowyski

- Head coach: (Argentina) Guillermo Vecchio

=== Canada ===
- 4 Joey Vickery
- 5 Ronn McMahon
- 6 Steve Nash
- 7 David Turcotte
- 8 Rowan Barrett
- 9 Cordell Llewellyn
- 10 Kory Hallas
- 11 Dwight Walton
- 12 William Njoku
- 13 Jeff Foreman
- 14 Rob Wilson
- 15 Sean VanKoughnett

- Head coach: (Canada) Ken Shields

=== Cuba ===
- 4 Ángel Caballero
- 5 Yudith Abreu
- 6 Roberto Amaro
- 7 Ángel Núñez
- 8 José Luis Díaz
- 9 Roberto Herrera García
- 10 Leonardo Pérez
- 11 Lazaro Borrell
- 12 Luciano Rivero
- 13 Pedro Cobarrubias
- 14 Richard Matienzo
- 15 Andrés Guibert

- Head coach: (Cuba) Miguel Calderón Gómez

=== Puerto Rico ===
- 4 José Ortiz
- 5 Federico López
- 6 Dean Borges
- 7 Luis Allende
- 8 Jerome Mincy
- 9 James Carter
- 10 Javier Antonio Colón
- 11 Julián Rodríguez
- 12 Mario Morales
- 13 Edgar de León
- 14 Eddie Casiano
- 15 Félix Javier Pérez

- Head coach: (Puerto Rico) Carlos Morales

=== Uruguay ===
- 4 Horacio López
- 5 Camilo Acosta
- 6 Luis Pierri
- 7 Julio Pereyra
- 8 Alain Mayor
- 9 Juliano Rivera
- 10 Marcelo Capalbo
- 11 Diego Losada
- 12 Gustavo Szczygielski
- 13 Adrián Laborda
- 14 Enrique Tucuna
- 15 Federico Garcín

- Head coach: (Uruguay) Víctor Hugo Berardi

== Bibliography ==
- Mexico 2015 FIBA Americas Championship Guía Histórica 1980–2015 (in Spanish). FIBA. 2015. p. 53–59.
