= History of Boca Juniors (basketball) =

The history of Boca Juniors basketball section can be traced to 1929, when the club executives decided to open a basketball section, when the sport was still amateur in the country. Boca Juniors started competing one year later, when the club affiliated to "Federación Argentina de Básquetbol", the only regulation body by then.

Boca would then play in another basketball associations such as "Asociación de Básquet de Buenos Aires", where most of the football clubs played. In successive years, Boca would win a considerable amount of championships not only in the amateur or semi-professional leagues but also in professional Liga Nacional.

== The beginning ==
The basketball section of Boca Juniors was created in 1929, requesting affiliation to the association but it was rejected. In 1930 the club could be registered to Federación Argentina de Básquet (the body that governed basketball in Argentina by then) but only junior teams took part of the competitions. The good results encouraged the club to continue participating in the league. In 1934 the team debuted at second division finishing second.

In 1937, a rift developed between the Buenos Aires Basketball Association and some of its affiliated clubs, including Boca Juniors. Following this conflict, Boca, along with River Plate, Racing Club, Independiente, San Lorenzo, Sportivo Barracas, Estudiantes de La Plata, Lanús and Talleres de Remedios de Escalada, It decided to disaffiliate from the governing body and form a new parallel entity called the Buenos Aires Basketball Association (ABBA), of a semi-amateur nature, with an orientation towards professionalism. In their first participation in the tournaments organized by the new league, Boca obtained four victories and two defeats.

On 27 November 1938 Boca Juniors played United States' team Amateur Athletic Union at the Luna Park of Buenos Aires. Boca won the match 38-33 being the first victory achieved by an Argentine basketball team over a North American side. The line-up was José Giuliano, Víctor Di Vita, Pedro Aizcorbe, Carlos Stropiana y Roberto Contini.

== The "all-star" team ==
Between the late 1930s and early 1940s, Boca Juniors won its first titles in Buenos Aires basketball. The team was crowned champion of the 1938 Torneo Apertura (Opening Tournament) undefeated, and the following year, it finished as runner-up in the Torneo Oficial (Official Tournament) with 10 wins and one loss, in addition to winning the Torneo Apertura again without a single defeat.

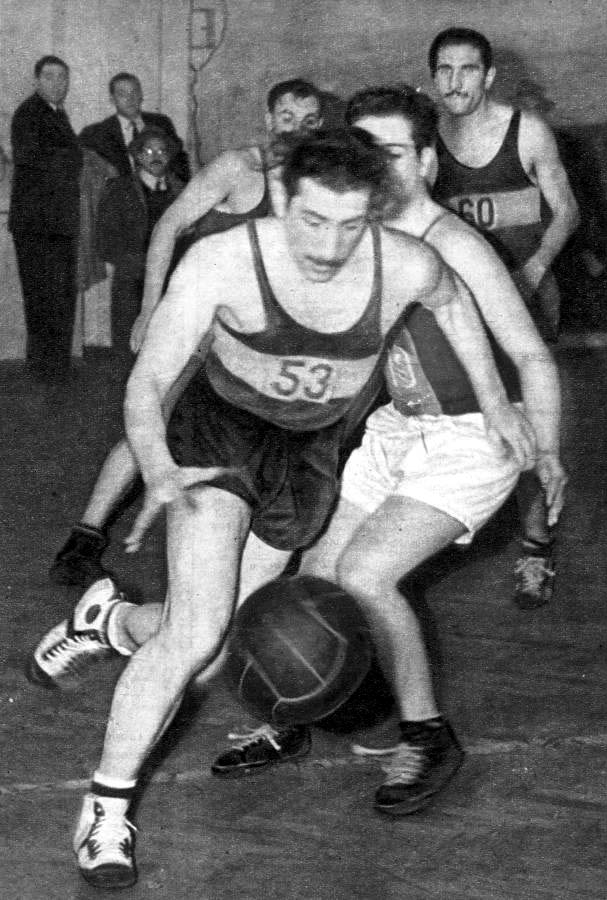
Oscar Izquierdo (Boca Juniors) dribbles over Trama (San Lorenzo), 1946.

On June 1, 1940, as part of the celebrations for the inauguration of the La Bombonera, Boca played a friendly match against Estudiantes de La Plata, winning 57-52.

The club also won the Buenos Aires Association's official championships in 1940 and 1941, while in 1942 they finished as runners-up and in 1943 they took third place. The players who made up the squad during that period were, in alphabetical order: Pedro Aizcorbe, Daniel Anglés, Elías Bissio, Roberto Contini, Alberto Dayán, Víctor Di Vita, José Giuliano, Carlos Induni, Felipe Mattianich, Mario Mattioni, Pedro Rodríguez, and Carlos Stroppiana.

In 1947, a conflict arose between Boca Juniors and the Buenos Aires Basketball Association (ABBA), jeopardizing the participation of its representative teams after the club threatened to withdraw from the governing body. The Boca leadership was pushing for a merger between the Argentine Basketball Federation and the ABBA, but ultimately, after a series of negotiations, Boca decided to remain part of the latter.

== Return to glory ==
In 1951, the Metropolitan Tournament was created, a new competition that brought together teams from the two rival leagues of the time: the Argentine Federation and the Buenos Aires Association. Starting in 1955, Boca Juniors began a project to regain its prestige in basketball. Rosario natives Enrique Borda joined the team in 1954, and Bernardo Schime and Rubén Petrilli in 1955. The roster also included Fazio, Alberto Noval, and Egidio De Fornasari, under the technical direction of Andrés Rossi.

Between 1956 and 1957, José Olivera, José Novoa, and Luis Pérez joined the team. This group began to achieve outstanding results: Boca Juniors won the Metropolitano Tournament in 1957 and 1959, after having been runner-up in 1958. They also finished as runners-up in the Buenos Aires Association's Official Tournament in 1958 and 1959.

== The triple-triple crown ==
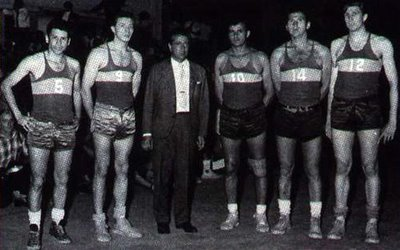
Boca Juniors' multi-championship-winning squad from the 1960s. From left to right: Jesús Díaz, Enrique Borda, coach Abelardo Rafael Dasso, Bernardo Schime, Miguel Carrizo, and Alberto Desimone.

At that time, the stadium used for the sport was the "Salón Azul" ("Blue Hall" in Spanish), located in the same area where the "Museo de la Pasión Boquense" ("Boca Juniors Passion Museum" in Spanish) is currently located.

After Andrés Rossi's departure in 1959, Abelardo Rafael Dasso took over as head coach, beginning one of the most outstanding periods in Boca Juniors basketball history. The roster during those years included players such as Enrique Borda, Jesús María Díaz, Miguel Carrizo, Bernardo Schime, Alberto Desimone, Luis Pérez, Egidio De Fornasari, Alberto Noval, Héctor Vázquez, Rubén Castelli, Juan Carlos Mazzini, Abel Rojas, Luis Torrás, Edgardo Molinari, and Héctor Rosales.

Between 1961 and 1963, Boca Juniors achieved the treble, winning the Torneo Apertura, the Torneo Metropolitano, and the Buenos Aires Association Championship. During that period, they played 93 matches, with a record of 89 wins and 4 losses. Subsequently, they added further titles: the 1964 Torneo Apertura and the Buenos Aires Association Championships in 1965, 1966, and 1967.

In 1969, Boca Juniors again won the Torneo Metropolitano and finished as runners-up in the Buenos Aires Association Championship. The following year, they won the Buenos Aires Association Championship once more, defeating Lanús 91–76 at River Plate's Microstadium. The team was coached by Enrique Borda and featured Juan Carlos Mazzini, Néstor Delguy, Adalberto Gusso, Emilio Dumani, Juan Tito, and Jesús María Díaz.

== Economic crisis and restructuring ==
Boca played the 1984 season, the last before the creation of Liga Nacional de Básquet, although the severe crisis of the club by then caused the team went off the competition few days before the beginning of the tournament. Boca made an effort to play in the second division in 1986 but the association did not allow the team to participate so Boca had to play at the last division, the Regional C. The team promoted to Liga B that same year.

== First participation in LNB ==
In 1988, Boca Juniors achieved promotion to the top division by winning the tournament organized by the Confederación Argentina de Básquetbol. The team was led by Horacio Seguí, who years later served as coach of the Argentina men's national basketball team.

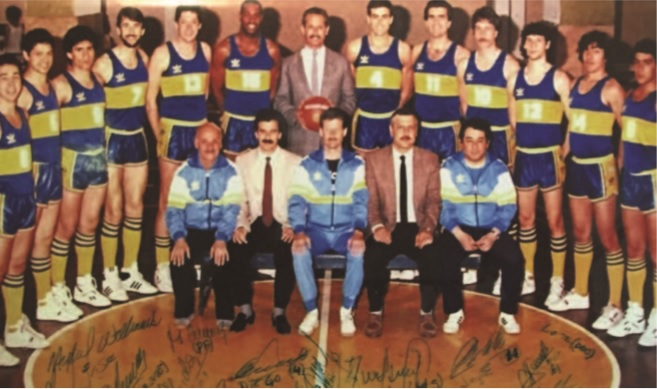
Squad that won the 1988 National B League title. By jersey number: 4 Diego de Simone, 5 Ángel Cerisola, 6 Carlos Centeno, 7 Ricardo Rattone, 10 Norberto Meire, 11 Vicente Pellegrino, 12 Fabián Sachi, 13 Horacio Beigier, 14 Jorge Malerba y 15 Thomas Minor

In the 1989 season of the National Basketball League, Boca Juniors played 32 games, with a record of 12 wins and 19 losses, finishing in 14th place out of 16 participating teams with a total of 43 points. This result resulted in their relegation to the National League B. In 1990, they competed in the second division, reaching the promotion final and finishing in second place. Despite not winning the championship, the team still earned the right to participate in the top division, thus achieving their return to the elite of Argentine basketball.

== 1996–97 season ==
On June 29, 1996, in a friendly match against Obras Sanitarias, the Luis Conde Stadium, built specifically for basketball, was inaugurated, built specifically for the practise of basketball, then named "Luis Conde" (mostly known as "La Bombonerita") in honour of a recently deceased vice president. The game ended 85–74 in favor of Boca Juniors. The stadium's construction was spearheaded by Mauricio Macri, then president of the club, along with Orlando Salvestrini, head of the basketball subcommittee.

In the 1996-97 National Basketball League, the team coached by Julio Lamas had an outstanding initial phase, finishing in first place. In the second phase, injuries affected their performance, causing them to relinquish the lead to Atenas; however, they managed to maintain second place and secured home-court advantage until the semifinals.

In the quarterfinals they defeated Regatas de San Nicolás 3-1, in the semifinals they beat Ferro 3-2, and in the decisive series they beat Independiente (General Pico) 4-1. With an overall record of 42 wins and 16 losses in 58 games played, Boca Juniors became champions for the first time of the National Basketball League.

The team roster was: Byron Wilson, Jerome Mincy, Ariel Bernardini, Luis Villar, Sebastián Festa, Gabriel Fernández, Claudio Farabello, Gustavo Fernández, Diego Prego, Claudio Chiappero, Sebastián Acosta, Esteban Acosta, Fernando Oyarzún and Ariel Eslava. Julio Lamas was the coach.

== Golden Era: 11 titles in five years ==
=== 2002–03 season ===
In 2002, they competed in the 2002 Argentine Basketball Cup, which was introduced as a preseason competition. They were in Group 2 of the qualifying round. In the quarterfinals, they defeated La Unión de Formosa 2-0, in the semifinals they beat Central Entrerriano by point differential (94-96 and 96-71), and in the final they defeated Ben Hur by the same margin (78-91 and 78-63). With these results, they advanced to the final quadrangular, where they defeated Argentino de Junín, Gimnasia (LP) and Atenas, becoming the first champion of the Copa Argentina.

=== 2003–04 season ===
With Sergio Hernández taking over as head coach, Boca Juniors won the 2003 Copa Argentina de Básquet, securing the title undefeated for the second consecutive year. They were placed in Group 2 of the qualifying round, where they defeated River Plate 2–0 in the quarterfinals, Obras Sanitarias 2–0 in the semifinals, and Quimsa 2–0 in the final. In the final quadrangular, they defeated Argentino de Junín, Gimnasia (LP) and Atenas.

In the 2003-04 National Basketball League, the team finished first in the first phase of the South Zone and repeated that position in the second phase, securing home-court advantage in all playoff series. In the quarterfinals, they defeated Belgrano (San Nicolás de los Arroyos) 3-0, in the semifinals they beat Obras 3-1, and in the final they faced Gimnasia y Esgrima La Plata, losing the first two games at home. They then rallied to win the series 4-2. They finished the season with a record of 44 wins and 13 losses in 57 games, averaging 95.8 points for and 85.0 points against.

=== 2004–05 season ===
In the 2004 Argentine Basketball Cup, they were placed in Series 1 of the qualifying round. In the quarterfinals, they faced Sionista, losing the first game 78-69 and winning the second 95-63, advancing on aggregate. In the semifinals, they eliminated Ciclista Juninense (2-0), and in the final, they defeated Central Entrerriano (2-0). In this way he qualified for the final quadrangular, where he defeated Obras (83-81), Libertad (S) (107-104) and River Plate (94-87), becoming three-time champion of the Argentine Cup.

In the 2004 South American Club Champions Championship, they were in Group B. They debuted with a loss against Guácharos (Venezuela) by 78-76, but then defeated Piratas de Medellín (Colombia) 94-62 and Uberlândia (Brazil) by 94-83, qualifying for the semifinals. There they defeated Deportivo San José (Paraguay) 82-78 and in the final they defeated Delfines (Venezuela) 92-87, becoming international champions for the first time.

In the Top 4 Tournament 2004, Boca beat Libertad (S) 90–70 in the first round, River Plate 79–75 in the second round and Ben Hur 82–81 in the last round, becoming champion of the tournament.

=== 2005–06 season ===
The season began in the 2005 Argentine Basketball Cup. Placed in Group 3 of the qualifying round, they defeated Ferro Carril Oeste 2–0 in the quarterfinals, Central Entrerriano 2–0 in the semifinals, and Quimsa 2–0 in the final. In the final quadrangular, they defeated Libertad (S) 95–91 on the first day, lost to Ben Hur 80–78 on the second day, and overcame River Plate 82–74 on the third day, becoming champions by point difference over Ben Hur, as both teams finished with two wins and one loss.

They subsequently competed in the 2005 South American Club Championship as defending champions. They were in Group B of the initial phase along with Libertad (S), Salto (Uruguay), and Delfines (Venezuela). They finished second with two wins and one loss, advancing to the semifinals, where they defeated Ben Hur 70–65 away. In the final they beat Uberlândia (Brazil) 85-75, becoming two-time champions in Rafaela with Carlos Duro as coach.

=== 2006–07 season ===
In the 2006 Argentine Cup, Boca was in Group 1 along with Obras, Gimnasia (LP), and Echagüe, winning all six of their matches and advancing to the next stage. In Series 1 of the Second Phase, they eliminated Argentino (J) 2-0 and qualified for the final four, where they defeated Regatas (91-80), Libertad (S), and Peñarol on the road (83-80). This secured their fifth consecutive championship, undefeated with a total of eleven wins.

That same year, they participated in the 2006 South American Club Championship, where they won their third title in the competition. They defeated Deportivo San José (Paraguay) (78-62), UniCEUB (Brazil) (76-74), Gimnasia (Costa Rica) (91-78), Universidad Católica (Chile) (94-67), and Guerreros de Lara (Venezuela) (97-85) consecutively. With Eduardo Cadillac as coach, Boca became three-time champions of the tournament.

During the 2006–07 season, Cadillac was replaced by Gabriel Piccato midway through the campaign. Under Piccato's leadership, the team won its third National League title. In the first phase, they competed in the South Zone and qualified for the 2006 Super 8 Tournament with a record of 7 wins and 7 losses. In the second phase, they finished third with 19 wins and 13 losses. In the playoffs, they eliminated Ben Hur (3-2) in the quarterfinals and Libertad (S) (3-2) in the semifinals. In the final, they defeated Peñarol 4-2, taking home advantage of their home court after winning in Mar del Plata, and were crowned champions at the Luis Conde Stadium. In total he played 59 games, with 35 wins and 24 losses, averaging 79.3 points for and 78.0 against. The championship squad consisted of Luis Cequeira, Leonardo Gutiérrez, Martín Leiva, Jamal Robinson, Raymundo Legaria, Jonatan Slider, Lázaro Borrell, Federico Aguerre, Gustavo Oroná, Leandro Podestá, Patricio Rodríguez, Rodrigo Sánchez, Leandro Palladino, Lucas Ortiz, Matías Fioretti and Nahuel Rodríguez.

=== 2023–24 season ===
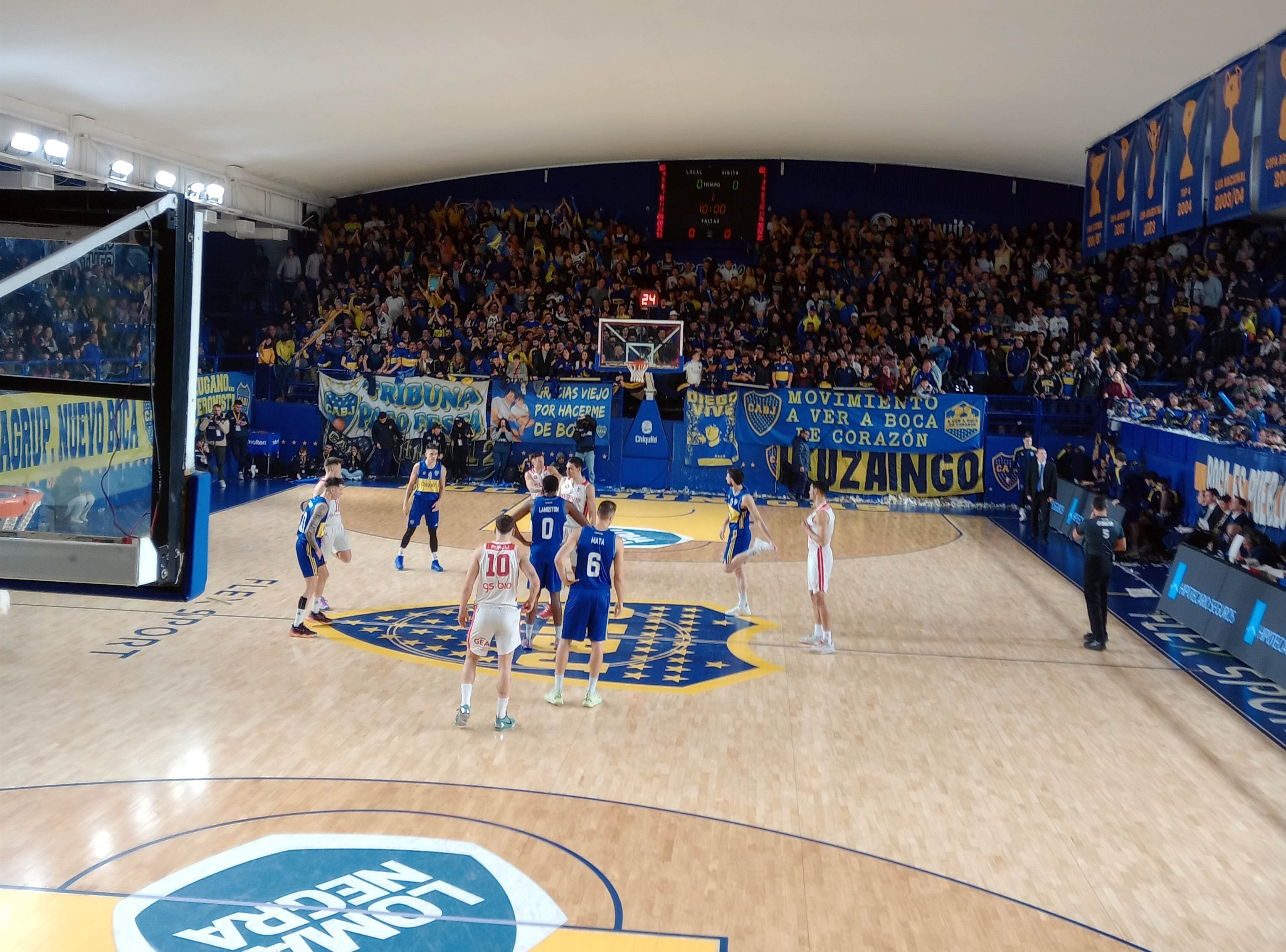
Boca vs Instituto at the opening tip-off of Game 3 of the 2023–24 season finals

In the 2023-24 National Basketball League, Boca started with five consecutive wins, placing them near the top of the standings. Throughout the regular season, they remained in contention for a direct berth in the quarterfinals, but a series of losses against lower-ranked teams led to the resignation of head coach Carlos Duro, when the team had fallen to ninth place with a 19–12 record. His assistant, Gonzalo Pérez, took over as head coach for the first time. Under his leadership, the team finished the regular season in fourth place with a record of 24 wins and 14 losses.

In playoffs, Boca eliminated San Lorenzo 3–1, and then in semifinals, Boca eliminated Quimsa 3–2. In the finals, Boca faced Instituto, which leaded the series 2–0 but a Boca Juniors' comeback put the series 4–2 to win a new league title in La Bombonerita, the fourth in their history after 17 years. Moreover, in playoffs Boca Juniors eliminated the three last league champions (San Lorenzo, Quimsa, and Instituto).

The champions were: José Vildoza, Leonel Schattmann, Leonardo Mainoldi, Marcos Mata, Wayne Langston, Sebastián Vega, José Defelippo, Raven Barber, Juan Martín Guerrero, Manuel Rodríguez, Nicolás Stenta, and Tiziano Prome.

=== 2024–25 season ===
After winning the 2023-24 National Basketball League, they played in the 2024 Liga Super Cup Final against Quimsa, whom they defeated 90-75, becoming champions for the first time in the competition.

They qualified first for the 2025 Super 20 Cup after finishing the first round of the 2024-25 National Basketball League with a 15-4 record. In the semifinal they faced Obras, whom they defeated 91-82, after an overtime period following a 72-72 tie. They played the final against Instituto, beating them 71-65 and becoming champions for the first time of the Super 20 Cup.

To defend their title in the 2024-25 season, key players from the previous season's championship team, including Marcos Mata, Leonel Schattmann, Leonardo Mainoldi, José Defelippo, Wayne Langston, and Raven Barber, left the team. They were replaced by Martín Cuello, Marcos Delía, Andrés Ibargüen, Facundo Piñero, Alphonso Anderson, and Thomas Cooper. After 11 games, the coaching staff decided to make a tactical change, terminating Alphonso Anderson's contract and signing Franco Giorgetti to bolster the defense and provide a rotation option. Their final record was 29 wins and 9 losses, which allowed them to qualify for the playoffs in first place in the overall standings.

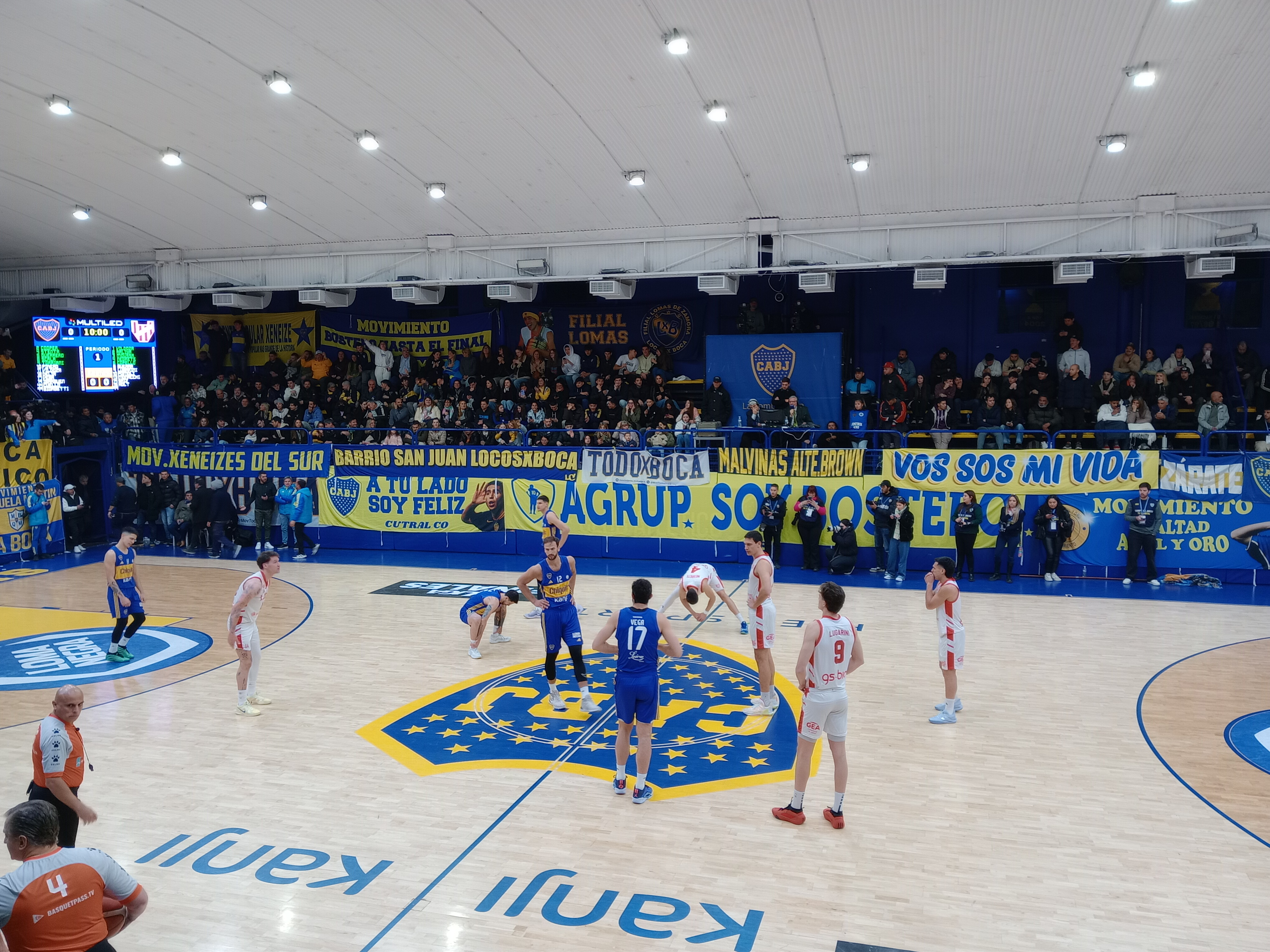
Boca Juniors vs Instituto in the first game of the finals

In the elimination phase, Boca Juniors advanced to the quarterfinals, where they faced Ferro Carril Oeste in a hard-fought series, which ended with a 3-2 victory for Boca. Subsequently, in the semifinals, they faced Quimsa in a best-of-five series, which ended with a 3-0 victory for Boca Juniors, allowing them to qualify for the championship final for the third consecutive season. In the final, Boca Juniors faced Instituto in a best-of-seven series. The series went to a seventh game, where Boca Juniors prevailed 4-3, becoming champions of the Liga Nacional de Básquet for the fifth time in their history and securing their second consecutive title, having won the championship the previous season.

The championship-winning squad consisted of José Vildoza, Santiago Scala, Sebastián Vega, Martín Cuello, Marcos Delía, Andrés Ibargüen, Franco Giorgetti, Facundo Piñero, Thomas Cooper, Juan Martín Guerrero, Alphonso Anderson, Nicolás Stenta, Fidel Rotta, Tiziano Prome, Martín Torriani and Tiago Drocezesky, under the technical direction of Gonzalo Pérez.
