= Campeonato Panamericano de Clubes de Básquetbol =

International basketball tournament

Campeonato Panamericano de Clubes de Básquetbol Pan American Basketball Club Championship
- Founded: 1993; 33 years ago
- First season: 1993
- Folded: 2000; 26 years ago
- Country: Latin America
- Confederation: FIBA Americas
- Number of teams: 8
- Level on pyramid: 1
- Related competitions: FIBA South American League
- Last champions: (Argentina) Estudiantes de Olavarría (1 title)
- Most championships: (Brazil) Franca (4 titles)

The Campeonato Panamericano de Clubes de Básquetbol (English: Pan American Basketball Club Championship) was an international professional basketball tournament that was contested from 1993 to 2000, with the exception of 1998, when it was scheduled to be held in the Dominican Republic, and was cancelled due to Hurricane Georges. The team that won the most championships was Franca Basquetebol Clube, with 4 titles.

This tournament which was known as Copa America in its first editions, was the predecessor of the FIBA Americas League created in 2007.

== History ==
The Pan American Club Championship, founded in 1993, was the top-tier level annual professional basketball competition for all of Latin America. It was not held in 1998, due to Hurricane Georges. The competition's last season was held in 2000. A new version of the Pan American Club Championship, called the FIBA Americas League, was created in 2007 and it was then replaced by the BCL in 2019.

=== Names of the top-tier level Pan-American competition ===
  - Campeonato Panamericano de Clubes de Básquetbol (English: Pan American Basketball Club Championship): (1993–2000)
- FIBA Americas era: (2007–present)
  - FIBA Americas League: (2007 – 2019)
  - Basketball Champions League Americas: (2019–present)

== Classification ==
| Year | Host city | Champions | Finalists | Third place | Fourth place | Fifth place | Sixth place | Seventh place | Eight place |
|---|---|---|---|---|---|---|---|---|---|
| 1993 | (Ecuador) Quito | (Brazil) All Star Sabesp/Franca | (Argentina) Atenas | (Mexico) Indios de Ciudad Juárez | (Ecuador) Adidas | | | | |
| 1994 | (Argentina) Córdoba / Olavarría | (Brazil) Sabesp/Franca | (Argentina) Olimpia de Venado Tuerto | (Brazil) Esporte Clube União Corinthians | (Argentina) Atenas | | | | |
| 1995 | (Brazil) Santa Cruz do Sul / Porto Alegre | (Brazil) Rio Claro | (Argentina) Peñarol Mar del Plata | (Brazil) Pony EC União Corinthians | (Brazil) Franca | | | | |
| 1996 | (Brazil) Franca (9-15 September 1996) | (Argentina) Atenas | (Brazil) Cougar/Franca | (Brazil) Dharma/Yara Franca | (Argentina) Independiente de General Pico | | | | |
| 1997 | (Argentina) General Pico | (Brazil) Marathon/Franca | (Argentina) Atenas | (Argentina) Independiente de General Pico | (Brazil) Mogi das Cruzes | (Uruguay) Club Atletico Cordon | | | |
| 1998 (Note: Teams of 1998 tournament: Marathon Franca (holders), Vasco de Gama (Brasil), Atenas and Independiente Pico (Argentina), U.de Concepción (Chile), San Carlos (Dominican) and Capitalinos (Cuba)) | (Dominican Republic) Santo Domingo (cancelled due to Hurricane Georges) | N/A | N/A | N/A | N/A | N/A | N/A | N/A | N/A |
| 1999 | (Dominican Republic) Santo Domingo | (Brazil) Franca | (Brazil) Vasco da Gama | (Dominican Republic) Mauricio Baez | (Argentina) Independiente de General Pico | (Uruguay) Atlético Welcome | | | |
| 2000 | (Uruguay) Montevideo | (Argentina) Estudiantes de Olavarría | (Uruguay) Aguada | (Uruguay) Atlético Welcome | (Brazil) Marathon Franca | (Brazil) Vasco da Gama | (Mexico) Mayas de Yucatán | (Panama) Colosos de Tumba Muerto | (Dominican Republic) Pueblo Nuevo |

== Finals ==
| Year | Winners | Runners-up | Score |
|---|---|---|---|
| 1993 | (Brazil) Franca | (Argentina) Atenas | 115-105 |
| 1994 | (Brazil) Franca | (Argentina) Olimpia de Venado Tuerto | 98-97 |
| 1995 | (Brazil) Rio Claro | (Argentina) Peñarol Mar del Plata | 78-75 |
| 1996 | (Argentina) Atenas | (Brazil) Cougar/Franca | 81-78 |
| 1997 | (Brazil) Marathon/Franca | (Argentina) Atenas | 75-67 |
| 1999 | (Brazil) Franca | (Brazil) Vasco da Gama | 88-87 |
| 2000 | (Argentina) Estudiantes de Olavarría | (Uruguay) Club Atlético Aguada | 74-64 |

== Performances ==
=== Titles by club ===
| Club | Champions | Years won | Runners-up | Years Finalists |
|---|---|---|---|---|
| (Brazil) Franca | 4 | 1993, 1994, 1997, 1999 | 1 | 1996 |
| (Argentina) Atenas | 1 | 1996 | 2 | 1993, 1997 |
| (Brazil) Rio Claro | 1 | 1995 | 0 | – |
| (Argentina) Estudiantes de Olavarría | 1 | 2000 | 0 | – |
| (Argentina) Olimpia de Venado Tuerto | 0 | – | 1 | 1994 |
| (Argentina) Peñarol de Mar del Plata | 0 | – | 1 | 1995 |
| (Brazil) Vasco da Gama | 0 | – | 1 | 1999 |
| (Uruguay) Aguada | 0 | – | 1 | 2000 |

=== Titles by country ===
| Country (national league) | Champions | Years won | Runners-up | Years Finalists |
|---|---|---|---|---|
| Brazil (CBB) | 5 | 1993, 1994, 1995, 1997, 1999 | 2 | 1996, 1999 |
| Argentina (LNB) | 2 | 1996, 2000 | 4 | 1993, 1994, 1995, 1997 |
| Uruguay (CFB) | 0 | – | 1 | 2000 |

== Statistical leaders ==
=== Tournament top scorer ===
| Season | Top scorer | Club | Total points |
|---|---|---|---|
| 1994 | (United States) Carey Scurry | (Brazil) Franca | |
| 2000 | (Mexico) Víctor Mariscal | (Mexico) Mayas de Yucatán | 135 |

== Pan-American Cup Finals Top Scorers ==
| Season | Top scorer | Club | Points Scored |
|---|---|---|---|
| 1993 | (United States) Dexter Shouse | (Brazil) Franca | 39 |
| 1994 | (United States) Carey Scurry | (Brazil) Franca | 27 |
| 1996 | (Argentina) Hector Campana | (Argentina) Atenas Cordoba | 34 |
| 1997 | (Brazil) Demétrius Conrado Ferraciú | (Brazil) Franca | 21 |
| 2000 | (Argentina) Víctor Baldo | (Argentina) Estudiantes Olavarria | 16 |

== MVP ==
| Season | Top scorer | Club |
|---|---|---|
| 2000 | (United States) Byron Wilson | (Argentina) Estudiantes Olavarria |

== Rosters ==
=== 1993 Final ===
Cougar Franca (115): Dexter Shouse. Coach: Hélio Rubens
Atenas (105): Diego Osella, Luis Villar.

=== 1994 Final ===
Cougar Franca (98): Maury, Chuí, Dexter Shouse, Rogério Klafke, Fábio Pira - Demétrius Conrado Ferraciú, Janjao. Coach: Hélio Rubens
Olimpia (97): Héctor Campana, Alejandro Montecchia, Jorge Racca, Lucas Victoriano, Sebastian Uranga, Gabriel Darrás, Orlando Tourn, Orlando Lightfoot, George Montgomery, Leonardo Gutiérrez. Coach: Julio Lamas

=== 1995 Final ===
Rio Claro: Valtinho da Silva, Scooby Tec, Taddei Cury, Paulao, Antonio Santana, Luiz Felipe Azevedo, Almir, Gibi, Daniel Ricardo Probst, Efigenio, Seu Agostinho, Walter Rosamila, Gustavo.
Penarol: Marcelo Richotti, Ariel Bernardini, Héctor Campana, Diego Maggi, Pablo Sebastián Rodríguez. Coach: Néstor García

=== 1996 Final ===
Atenas Cordoba (81): Marcelo Milanesio, Greg Dennis, Wallace Bryant, Fabricio Oberto, Diego Osella - Héctor Campana, Bruno Lábaque, Leandro Palladino, Alejandro Olivares. Coach: Rubén Magnano
Cougar Franca (78): Helinho, Demétrius Conrado Ferraciú, Ronnie Thompkins, Rogério Klafke, Jose Vargas, Isaías, Fernando Reis, Evandro. Coach: Hélio Rubens

=== 1997 Final ===
Cougar Franca (75): Helinho, Chuí, Demétrius Conrado Ferraciú, Rogério Klafke, Jose Vargas, Fabio Pira, Evandro, Ricardo Giannecchini, Guillherme da Luz, Serafin. Coach: Hélio Rubens
Atenas Cordoba (67): Bruno Lábaque, Leandro Palladino Steve Edwards, Stephen Rich, Fabricio Oberto - Marcelo Milanesio, Diego Osella, Héctor Campana, Gabriel Riofrio, Pellusi. Coach: Rubén Magnano

=== 1999 Final ===
Cougar Franca (88): Helinho, Chuí, Sandro Varejao, Guillherme da Luz, Gilsinho, Mike Higgins, Rodrigo Bahia, Fernando Reis, Fransergio, Ricardo Giannecchini, Valtinho da Silva, Edu Mineiro, Jorginho, Marcio Dornelles. Coach: Hélio Rubens
Vasco da Gama (87): Demétrius Conrado Ferraciú, Paulinho, Jose Vargas, Charles Byrd, Janjao, Mingao, Joao Batista, Rogerio, Diego, Espiga, Ricardinho. Coach: Flor Meléndez

=== 2000 Final ===
Estudiantes de Olavarria (74): Gustavo Fernández, Daniel Farabello, Gabriel Díaz, Dwight McGray, Gabriel Fernández - Byron Wilson, Victor Baldo, Paolo Quinteros. Coach: Sergio Hernandez
Aguada (64): Jorge Cabrera, Diego Losada, Sterling Davis, Bill Washington, Fredy Navarrete, Hébert Núñez, Diego Castrillón, González. Coach: Alberto Espasandín

== See also ==
- FIBA Americas League
- Basketball Champions League Americas
- FIBA South American League
- South American Championship of Champions Clubs

== Sources ==
- 1999 Tournament
- 2000 Tournament
- 1994 Olimpia
- Historical standings
- Franca vs Atenas rivalry (Spanish)
