= 1958 South American Basketball Championship of Champion Clubs =

4th season of the South American Clubs Championship

1958 Campeonato Sudamericano de Clubes Campeones de Básquetbol
Tournament details
- City: Quito, Ecuador
- Dates: 16 August - 1 September 1958
- Teams: 8

Final positions
- Champions: Sporting Club Uruguay (1st title)
- Runners-up: (Argentina) San Lorenzo
- Third place: (Colombia) Valle del Cauca Select Team
- Fourth place: (Ecuador) L.D.U. Quito

The 1958 South American Basketball Championship of Champion Clubs was the 4th edition of the Campeonato Sudamericano de Clubes Campeones de Básquetbol, the first-tier basketball competition in South America.

Eight teams from eight countries participated and played each other in a round-robin format. Chile sent its national team as their representative, Colombia and Brazil sent two select teams that were created for the tournament.

The competition was played from 16 August to 1 September 1958 and was held in Quito, the capital city of Ecuador. Sporting Club Uruguay won the championship, becoming the first Uruguayan club to do so.

== Final standings ==
Key

- Pos.: Position
- GP: Games played
- W: Games won
- L: Games lost
- Pts: Points (2 given for a win, 1 for a loss)

Pos.	Club	GP	W	L	Pts
1	Sporting Club Uruguay	7	5	2	12
2	(Argentina) San Lorenzo	7	5	2	12
3	(Colombia) Valle del Cauca Select Team	7	5	2	12
4	(Ecuador) L.D.U. Quito	7	4	3	11
5	(Paraguay) Olimpia Asunción	7	4	3	11
6	(Ecuador) Oriente	7	3	4	10
7	Chile	7	2	5	9
8	(Brazil) Río Grande Select Team	7	0	7	7

== Winning roster ==
Player	Total Points
Héctor Costa (captain)	124
Adolfo Lubnicki	97
Enrique Baliño	60
José Llera	39
Jorge Pagani	34
Zafiro Antúnez	31
Hugo Vázquez	24
Luciano Aranzadi	23
Tydeo Irigoyen	20
Carlos Peinado	4
Nelson Chelle	4
Carlos Roselló	2
José Otonello.	–

Head coach: Héctor López Reboledo
