= Ferro Carril Oeste (basketball) =

- Nickname: Ferro, Verdolaga
- Leagues: LNB
- Founded: 1933; 93 years ago (basketball section)
- Arena: Estadio Héctor Etchart
- Location: Caballito, Buenos Aires, Argentina
- Team colors
- President: Guillermo Bameule
- Vice-president: Carlos Pandolfi
- Head coach: Federico Fernández
- Website: ferrocarriloeste.org.ar/basquet
Home	Away

Club Ferro Carril Oeste Basquet, or Ferro Basquet, is a professional basketball team based in Caballito, Buenos Aires, Argentina. It is a part of the sports club Club Ferro Carril Oeste.

The club currently plays in Liga Nacional de Básquet, the top division of the Argentine basketball system. Ferro was the competition's first winner in 1985, with a total of 3 league titles won to date. It was also the first team to win two consecutive titles (1985–86), and the first Argentine team to become South American champion (in 1981). Besides, Ferro Carril Oeste is one of the three Argentine clubs to have played a final of the FIBA Intercontinental Cup (1986).

== History ==
The club affiliated to Federación Argentina in 1921, playing in youth divisions. The first senior squad was formed in 1933, playing its first international v Uruguayan side Atenas de Montevideo. Ferro disaffiliated from the FAB in 1941, switching to recently founded "Asociación Argentina de Básquet" (AAB). Under the AAB, Ferro was runner-up in the 1956 Metropolitano, playing the final at Estadio Luna Park-

In 1968, Ferro was promoted to the first division of the Buenos Aires Basketball Association. In 1971 the club inaugurated its arena, "Estadio Héctor Etchart". In 1974, the two federations operating in Buenos Aires merged to form "Federación Única". By those times Ferro developed a strong rivalry with Obras Sanitarias. Coach León Najnudel arrived to the club in 1976. Under his leading and helped by notable players such as Miguel Cortijo, Ferro Carril Oeste achieved its first professional success, winning Torneo Metropolitano, Torneo Apertura and Torneo Oficial. The team also won the Campeonato Argentino de Clubes in 1981.

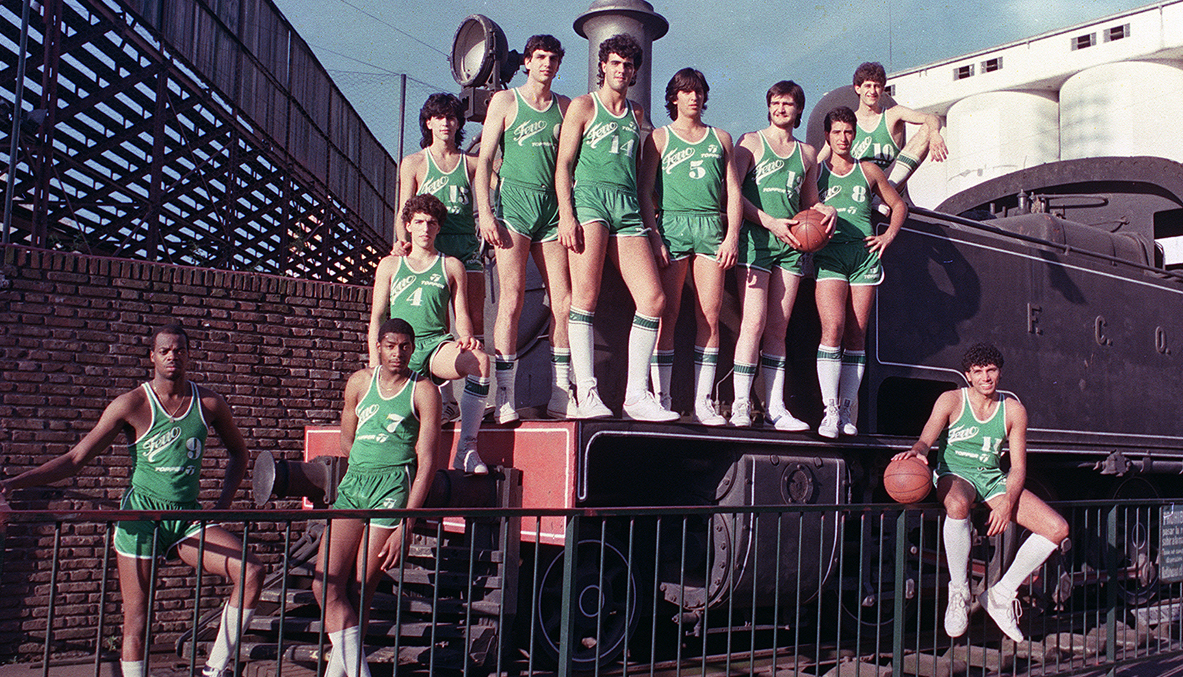
Ferro players posing with an old locomotive for El Gráfico, after winning their first LNB title in 1985

Ferro also became the first Argentine team to win the Campeonato Sudamericano de Clubes (South American Club Championship) in 1981 and 1982, with the second title after beating Obras Sanitarias in the final. Najnudel left the club to coach Spanish team CB Zaragoza, being replaced by former player Luis Martínez. The international success continued in 1987, with Ferro winning another edition of the Sudamericano.

When the top Liga Nacional de Básquet began in 1985, Ferro's main rival became Atenas de Córdoba. Ferro won the Argentine League championship in 1985 and 1986, finished 2nd in 1987, and also won it 1989. They also competed at the Club World Cup in 1981, 1986, and 1987, and they were that competition's runner-up in 1986.

At the end of 2003–04 season, Ferro was relegated to the Argentine second division, the Torneo Nacional de Ascenso (TNA). The team played there until 2015, when Ferro returned to LNB after Ciclista Juninense was relegated to TNA.

== Players ==
=== Current roster ===
Ferro Carril Oeste roster
Players
Coaches

Pos.	No.	Nat.	Name	Ht.		Age
G	2	(Argentina)	Torresi, Jonatan	1.92 m (6 ft 4 in)		32 – 13 May 1994
PG	4	(Argentina)	Lezcano, Emiliano	1.88 m (6 ft 2 in)		25 – 2 May 2001
G	5	(Argentina)	Defelippo, José	1.86 m (6 ft 1 in)		29 – 26 July 1997
PG	6	(Argentina)	Martínez, Jano David	1.76 m (5 ft 9 in)		23 – 24 April 2003
F	9	(Argentina)	Rodríguez, Felipe	1.95 m (6 ft 5 in)		23 – 12 March 2003
C	10	(Argentina)	Piñero, Facundo	2.03 m (6 ft 8 in)	110 kg (243 lb)	37 – 26 September 1988
PG	12	(Argentina)	Gallegos, Rodrigo	1.86 m (6 ft 1 in)		35 – 28 January 1991
G	13	(Argentina)	Rodríguez, Camilo	1.87 m (6 ft 2 in)		23 – 20 March 2003
F	14	(Argentina)	Diez, Alejandro	2.01 m (6 ft 7 in)		39 – 21 February 1987
F	22	(Italy)	Cerruti, Matteo	1.95 m (6 ft 5 in)		25 – 11 May 2001
SG	25	(Argentina)	Bettiga, Valentín	1.93 m (6 ft 4 in)	92 kg (203 lb)	26 – 9 October 1999
F	32	(Argentina)	Vasirani, Eduardo	2.00 m (6 ft 7 in)		35 – 16 January 1991

Head coach

- (Argentina) José Franzi

Legend

- (C) Team captain
- Injured

- Roster
Updated: 2020-01-01

=== Notable players ===
- (Argentina) Miguel Cortijo (1976–92)
- (Argentina) Diego Maggi (1985–89)
- (Argentina) Gabriel Fernández (1995–96)
- (Argentina) Luis Scola (1995–98)
- (Argentina) Martín Leiva (1997–2001)
- (Argentina) Diego Lo Grippo (1998–2001)
- (Argentina) Federico Kammerichs (1998–2001)
- (Argentina) Luis Oroño
- (Argentina) Sebastián Uranga (1981–85)
- (Argentina) Javier Maretto
- (Argentina) Daniel Aréjula
- (Argentina) Horacio López
- (United States) Erron Maxey (2001)
- (Puerto Rico) Ramón Clemente
- (Uruguay) "Tato" López
- (United States) Ben Gillery
- (United States) Harthorne Wingo
- (United States) Glenn Mosley
- (United States) Rory White (1991–92)
- (United States) Mike Schlegel

== Head coaches ==
- (Argentina) León Najnudel (1976–82, 1989–90, 1996)

== Titles ==
=== Domestic ===
- Torneo Metropolitano (1): 1980
- Torneo Oficial de la Federación de Buenos Aires (3): 1980, 1982, 1983
- Torneo de Apertura de la Federación de Buenos Aires (3): 1980, 1981, 1982
- Campeonato Argentino de Clubes (1): 1981
- Liga Nacional de Básquet (3): 1985, 1986, 1989

=== International ===
- Campeonato Sudamericano de Clubes (3): 1981, 1982, 1987
