= Robertão (basketball) =

Brazilian basketball player

Roberto José Corrêa
Personal information
- Born: May 05 1949 Rio de Janeiro, Brazil
- Died: Sep 08 2021 Franca, Brazil
- Listed height: 6 ft 6.75 in (2.00 m)
- Position: Small forward

Career highlights
- 3× South American Club champion; 5× Brazilian champion (1971, 1974, 1975, 1980, 1981 (II)); 5× São Paulo State champion
Medals
Representing Brazil
Men's basketball
FIBA World Cup
Bronze medal – third place	1978 Manila
Pan American Games
Gold medal – first place	1971 Colombia
Bronze medal – third place	1975 Mexico
FIBA South American Championship
Gold medal – first place	1971 Uruguay
Gold medal – first place	1973 Colombia

Roberto "Robertão" José Corrêa (born 3 January 1951), also commonly known as Roberto Corrêa, or simply as, "Robertão", is a Brazilian former professional basketball player.

== Professional career ==
During his pro club career, Robertão won 5 Brazilian Championships, in the seasons 1971, 1974, 1975, 1980, and 1981 (II), while a member of Franca. He also played with the Brazilian clubs Flamengo, Araçatuba, COC/Ribeirão Preto, and Yara Clube.

== National team career ==
With the senior Brazilian national basketball team, Robertão competed the 1974 FIBA World Cup and the 1978 FIBA World Cup.

He won a gold medal at the 1971 Pan American Games, and a bronze medal at the 1975 Pan American Games. He also won gold medals at the 1971 FIBA South American Championship, and the 1973 FIBA South American Championship.
