= Miguel Cortijo =

Argentine basketball player

Miguel Alberto Cortijo
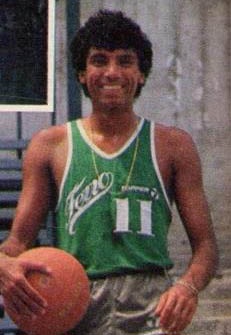
- Cortijo in 1982.

Personal information
- Born: August 22, 1958 (age 68) La Banda, Argentina
- Listed height: 6.2 ft 0 in (1.89 m)

Career information
- Playing career: 1976–1998
- Position: Point guard
- Number: 11

Career history
- 1976–1990: Ferro Carril Oeste
- 1990–1991: Peñarol
- 1991–1992: Ferro Carril Oeste
- 1992–1993: Olímpico de La Banda
- 1993–1994: Boca Juniors
- 1994–1995: Siderca Campana
- 1996–1997: Independiente (GP)
- 1997–1998: Regatas Corrientes
- 1998–2000: Quimsa

Career highlights
- 3× Campeonato Sudamericano de Clubes champion (1981, 1982, 1987); 3× Liga Nacional de Básquet champion (1985, 1986, 1989); N° 11 retired by Quimsa
Medals
Men's basketball
Representing Argentina
FIBA South American Championship
Gold medal – first place	1987 Asunción

Miguel Alberto Cortijo (born August 22, 1958 in La Banda, Santiago del Estero) is a retired Argentine basketball player. He spent his mostly career at Ferro Carril Oeste, the club where he won 4 local titles. Cortijo is considered one of the best point guards in Argentine basketball history.

== Career ==
Cortijo started his career at Club INTI of Santiago del Estero, playing in youth categories. He would be later drafted by León Najnudel (considered "the father" of the Liga Nacional de Básquet) who was coaching Ferro Carril Oeste at that time. Cortijo was only 18 when he was incorporated by Ferro where he spent most of his career, playing 14 consecutive years for the club. With Cortijo in the team, Ferro Carril Oeste won the 1980 Metropolitano championship and the Campeonato Sudamericano de Clubes in 1981 and 1982.

In 1984 the Liga Nacional was created and Ferro won the 1985 and 1986 championships. The team also was the 1987 runner-up losing the finals against Atenas de Córdoba of Marcelo Milanesio and Héctor Campana. Cortijo continued playing for Ferro until 1990, where the club achieved a new Liga championship (in 1989, being coached by his mentor Najnudel) and the Campeonato Sudamericano de Clubes in 1986.

Cortijo was signed by Peñarol de Mar del Plata where he spent a year after returning to Ferro where he played another season. He then played in Club Olímpico (from his home town, La Banda) and then was signed by Boca Juniors for the 1993-94 season, where he met León Najnudel again, although the team did not win any title. In 1994 Cortijo played for Siderca (located in the city of Campana, Buenos Aires Province). His next team was Independiente of General Pico, La Pampa, where he won a new Sudamericano de Clubes championship although the team would be defeated by Boca Juniors at the Liga Nacional finals. In 1997 Cortijo joined Regatas Corrientes where he played until 1998, when he signed with Quimsa, where he put an end to his career after two seasons there.

== Honours and awards ==
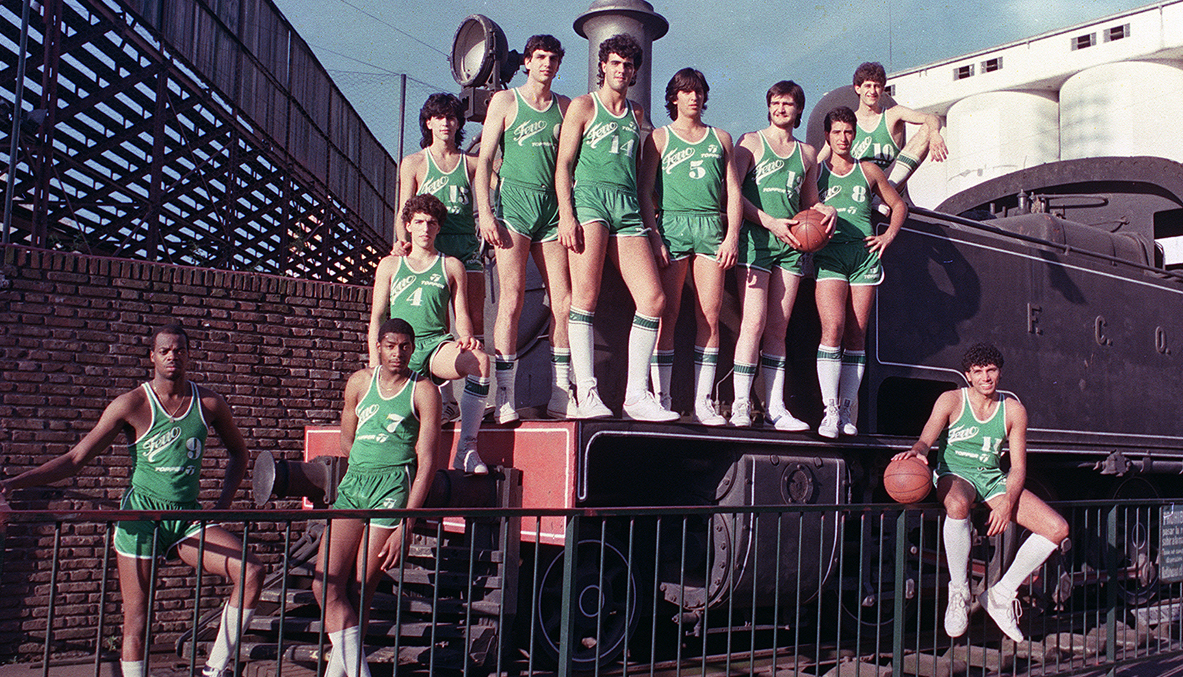
Cortijo (first from right, #11) posing with Ferro C. Oeste teammates after winning the first LNB title in 1985

=== Clubs ===
Domestic

- Campeonato Argentino (1): 1980
- Liga Nacional de Básquet (3): 1985, 1986, 1989

International

- Campeonato Sudamericano (4): 1981, 1982, 1987, 1996 (Note: Title shared with Independiente (GP).)
- Torneo Federación de Buenos Aires (3): 1980, 1982, 1983

=== National team ===
- Bronce Medal (Torneo de las Américas, Pre-Olympic Games) (1): 1980
- Gold Medal (Campeonato Sudamericano) (1): 1987

=== Individual ===
- Olimpia de Plata (4): 1980, 1981, 1986, 1987
- Konex Award (1): 1990
- Konex Foundation (Certificate of Distinction) (1): 1990
- Number 11 retired by Quimsa

=== Statistics ===
- 396 matches played at the Liga Nacional
- 4,201 points scored at the Liga Nacional (10,6 pts. per game)
