= Martín Leiva =

Argentine basketball player

Personal information
- Born: 23 April 1980 (age 46) Buenos Aires, Argentina
- Listed height: 2.10 m (6 ft 11 in)
- Listed weight: 113 kg (249 lb)

Career information
- Playing career: 1997–2023
- Position: Center

Career history
- 1997–2001: Ferro Carril Oeste
- 2001–2007: Boca Juniors
- 2007–2008: Autocid Ford Burgos
- 2008–2009: Baloncesto León
- 2009–2015: Peñarol de Mar del Plata
- 2015–2016: Regatas Corrientes
- 2016–2017: Obras Basket
- 2017–2018: Peñarol Mar del Plata
- 2018–2019: Estudiantes Concordia
- 2019–2023: Boca Juniors

Career highlights
- FIBA Americas League champion (2010); 3× South American Club Championship champion (2004–2006); 6× Argentine League champion (2004, 2007, 2010–2012, 2014)
Medals
Men's basketball
Representing Argentina
FIBA South American Championship
Silver medal – second place	2003 Montevideo
Gold medal – first place	2012 Resistencia
Silver medal – second place	2014 Venezuela
FIBA AmeriCup
Silver medal – second place	2005 Santo Domingo
Silver medal – second place	2007 Las Vegas
Gold medal – first place	2011 Mar del Plata

Martín Darío Leiva (born 23 April 1980) is an Argentine former professional basketball player. He is 2.10 m (6 ft 11 in) tall, and he played at the center position.

== Professional career ==
Leiva debuted in the LNB (Argentine 1st Division) on 12 October 1997, playing for Ferro Carril Oeste, against Independiente de General Pico. He played four seasons with Ferro, and then 6 with Boca Juniors in the top division. With Boca, he won the 2003–04 and 2006–07 seasons of the LNB.

In 2007, he moved to Spain to play for Autocid Ford Burgos, and the following season for Baloncesto León, both in the LEB (Spanish 2nd Division).

In 2009, he returned to Argentina, signing for Peñarol de Mar del Plata. Upon his return, he helped the team win the 2009–10 and 2010–11 seasons of the LNB, as well as the 2009–10 FIBA Americas League.

On 30 September 2019, Leiva returned to Boca Juniors.

== National team career ==
Leiva played with the junior national team of Argentina at the 1999 FIBA Under-19 World Cup. He has been a member of the senior men's Argentine national basketball team. In 2011, he was selected by coach Julio Lamas for the 2011 FIBA Americas Championship team. He competed at the 2012 Summer Olympics.
