= Félix Javier Pérez =

Puerto Rican basketball player

Personal information
- Born: May 31, 1971 Guayama, Puerto Rico
- Died: September 21, 2005 (aged 34) Guaynabo, Puerto Rico
- Listed height: 6 ft 10 in (2.08 m)
- Listed weight: 250 lb (113 kg)

Career information
- Playing career: 1990–2004
- Position: Center

Career history
- 1990–1997: Mets de Guaynabo
- 1998–1999: Atléticos de San Germán
- 2000–2001: Piratas de Quebradillas
- 2002: Capitanes de Arecibo
- 2003: Leones de Ponce
- 2003–2004: Capitanes de Arecibo

Félix Javier Pérez
Medal record

Men's basketball

Representing Puerto Rico

Goodwill Games
Gold medal – first place	1994 St. Petersburg	Team competition

Félix Javier Pérez Rivera (May 31, 1971 – September 21, 2005) was a Puerto Rican professional basketball player. In 15 seasons in the Baloncesto Superior Nacional (BSN), Pérez played for the Mets de Guaynabo, Atléticos de San Germán, Piratas de Quebradillas, Leones de Ponce, and Capitanes de Arecibo. In 1995, he led the league in rebounds with an average of 10.3 per game.

Pérez was a member of the Puerto Rican national basketball team. As part of the national team, he participated in the 1994 Goodwill Games where Puerto Rico won the gold medal, and the 1994 FIBA World Championship.

Pérez was killed on September 21, 2005, outside his home in Guaynabo, Puerto Rico, when he tried to help his neighbor during a robbery. He had a wife, Sara Aponte, and four children.

In 2010, Glorimari Jaime Rodríguez, mayor of Pérez's hometown Guayama, announced that the basketball stadium of Cimarrona would be renamed in his honor.

== Statistics ==
Legend
GP	Games played	GS	Games started	MPG	Minutes per game
FG%	Field goal percentage	3P%	3-point field goal percentage	FT%	Free throw percentage
RPG	Rebounds per game	APG	Assists per game	SPG	Steals per game
BPG	Blocks per game	PPG	Points per game	**Bold**	Career high

Year	Team	GP	FG%	3P%	FT%	RPG	APG	PPG
1990	Guaynabo	6	.500	.000	.250	1.5	0.2	2.0
1991	Guaynabo	14	.333	.000	**1.000**	1.6	0.1	1.3
1992	Guaynabo	33	.556	.000	.475	9.7	0.8	8.7
1993	Guaynabo	30	.488	.286	.442	3.3	1.0	7.7
1994	Guaynabo	30	.532	.000	.450	8.8	0.9	9.8
1995	Guaynabo	30	.602	**.316**	.491	**10.3**	**1.7**	**12.7**
1996	Guaynabo	**34**	.551	.125	.362	6.9	1.1	7.3
1997	Guaynabo	25	.622	.000	.520	4.7	0.9	9.6
1998	San Germán	31	.597	.000	.545	7.0	1.3	5.7
1999	San Germán	18	.620	.000	.556	6.2	1.1	5.7
2000	Quebradillas	23	.556	.000	.667	3.7	0.7	3.6
2001	Quebradillas	22	**.640**	.000	.565	9.8	1.3	7.9
2002	Arecibo	28	.548	.000	.355	7.9	1.6	6.5
2003	Ponce	24	.616	.000	.556	5.1	0.8	4.2
2003	Arecibo	6	.286	.000	.455	8.7	0.7	4.2
2004	Arecibo	27	.515	.500	.615	3.6	0.9	2.9
Career		381	.560	.213	.480	6.9	1.0	6.9
