= Francisco Sérgio García =

Brazilian basketball player

Personal information
- Born: 8 May 1948 (age 76); São Paulo, Brazil

Sport
- Sport: Basketball

Francisco Sérgio García, also commonly known as Fransérgio (born 8 May 1948) is a Brazilian basketball player. He competed in the men's tournament at the 1972 Summer Olympics.
