= Ben Gillery =

American basketball player

Personal information
- Born: September 19, 1965 (age 61) Detroit, Michigan, U.S.
- Listed height: 7 ft 0 in (2.13 m)
- Listed weight: 235 lb (107 kg)

Career information
- High school: Central (Detroit, Michigan)
- College: Hutchinson CC (1984–1986); Georgetown (1986–1988)
- NBA draft: 1988: undrafted
- Position: Center
- Number: 50

Career history
- 1988–1989: Sacramento Kings
- Stats at NBA.com
- Stats at Basketball Reference

Benjamin Gillery (born September 19, 1965, in Detroit, Michigan) is an American former professional basketball player. A 7'0" center from Hutchinson Community College and Georgetown University, Gillery was mainly a "project" player for the Hoyas, starting games but benched during the first stoppage of time. Although Gillery was never drafted by an NBA team, he played for the Sacramento Kings during the 1988-89 NBA season, averaging 1.0 points in 25 games. Gillery later played in the Continental Basketball Association (CBA) for the San Jose Jammers, Rapid City Thrillers and Cedar Rapids Silver Bullets. He now coaches young boys in basketball.

Gillery appeared on an episode of TV show Cristina's Court when his sister sued him for charges ($3,100) related to a vehicle leased by her for his use.

== Career statistics ==
Legend
GP	Games played	GS	Games started	MPG	Minutes per game
FG%	Field goal percentage	3P%	3-point field goal percentage	FT%	Free throw percentage
RPG	Rebounds per game	APG	Assists per game	SPG	Steals per game
BPG	Blocks per game	PPG	Points per game	**Bold**	Career high

=== NBA ===
==== Regular season ====
Year	Team	GP	GS	MPG	FG%	3P%	FT%	RPG	APG	SPG	BPG	PPG
1988–89	Sacramento	24	0	3.5	.316	–	.565	1.0	.1	.1	.2	1.0
