= Alexander Nelcha =

Venezuelan basketball player

Personal information
- Born: January 21, 1968 (age 58) Caracas, Venezuela
- Listed height: 6 ft 8 in (2.03 m)

Career information
- College: Bloomsburg State (1987-1991)
- Playing career: 1991–2005
- Position: Power forward

Career history
- 1991–1993: Maurienne Savoie (France)
- 1993–1996: JDA Dijon (France)
- 1996: Trotamundos de Carabobo (Venezuela)
- 1996–1998: JDA Dijon
- 1998: Trotamundos de Carabobo
- 1998: Toulouse Spacer's (France)
- 1998–1999: CB Murcia (Spain)
- 1999: Mabo Pistoia (Italy)
- 1999: Trotamundos de Carabobo
- 1999–2000: Le Mans (France)
- 2000–2001: Montpellier (France)
- 2001: Trotamundos de Carabobo
- 2001–2002: CSP Limoges (France)
- 2002: Trotamundos de Carabobo
- 2002–2003: CSP Limoges
- 2003–2005: Trotamundos de Carabobo

Alexander Angel Nelcha Dubard (born 21 January 1968 in Caracas) is a former professional Venezuelan basketball player.

== Career ==
Nelcha played professionally in France with JDA Dijon and Hyères-Toulon Var Basket, as well as in Italy with Mabo Pistoia and in Spain with CB Murcia. He played with the Venezuela national basketball team at the 1990 FIBA World Championship (12th place) and 1992 Summer Olympics (11th place).
