= Luis Jiménez (basketball) =

Venezuelan basketball player (born 1962)

Luis Jiménez Guevara (born 21 January 1962) is a Venezuelan former basketball player who competed in the 1992 Summer Olympics.
