= Guerrinha =

Brazilian basketball player and coach

Jorge "Guerrinha" Guerra
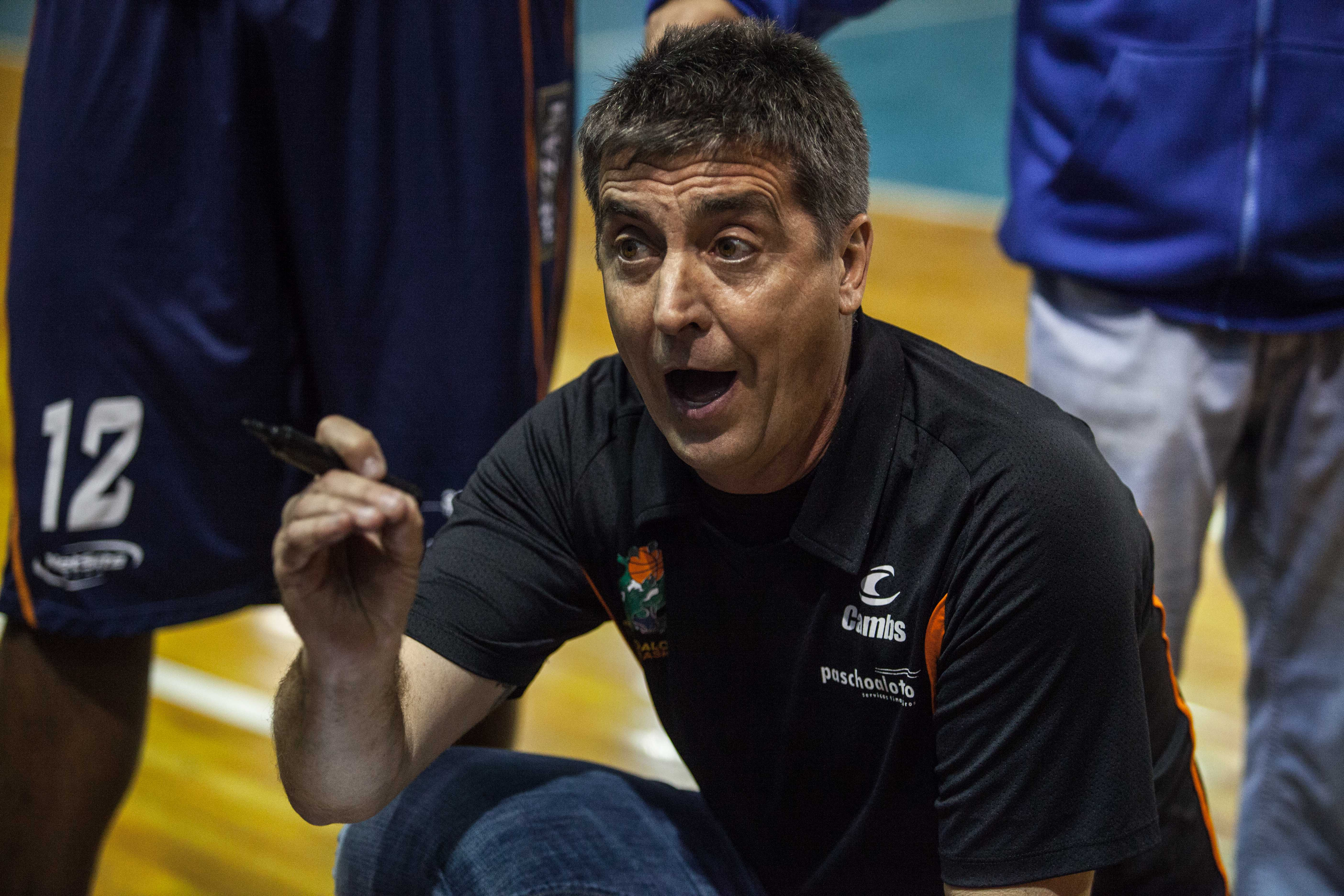
- Guerrinha, working as the head coach of Bauru.

Personal information
- Born: June 21, 1959 (age 67) Franca, São Paulo (state), Brazil
- Listed height: 6 ft 1.25 in (1.86 m)
- Listed weight: 175 lb (79 kg)
- Position: Point guard

Career highlights
- As a player: 4× Brazilian champion (1980, 1981 (II), 1990, 1991); As head coach: FIBA Americas League champion (2015); 2× FIBA South American League champion (2014, 2016); Brazilian champion (2002)

Jorge Guerra (born 21 June 1959), also commonly known in Brazil as Jorge Guerrinha, is a Brazilian former professional basketball player and coach.

== Professional playing career ==
Born in Franca, in the state of São Paulo, Guerra debuted in basketball when he was 16, playing with Amazonas Franca. He also played with C.A. Monte Líbano and Ribeirão Preto. During his pro club career, Guerra won 4 Brazilian Championships, in the seasons 1980, 1981 (II), 1990, and 1991.

== National team playing career ==
Guerra was a part of the senior Brazilian national basketball team that won the 1987 Pan American Games, in Indianapolis. In that tournament's final game, the Brazilian side outscored the home team, the Team USA, 120–115, which marked the first time that Team USA lost a game as a tournament host. It was also the first time Team USA was defeated in a finals game.

He also played at the 1986 FIBA World Cup, the 1988 Summer Olympic Games, the 1990 FIBA World Cup, and the 1992 Summer Olympic Games.

== Coaching career ==
Guerrinha has been the head coach of several Brazilian clubs, some of which include Ribeirão Preto/Polti/COC, ACF Campos and Bandeirantes/Rio Claro. In 2016, he became the head coach of the Brazilian club Mogi das Cruzes, after having previously been Bauru's head coach.
