= Enrique Baliño =

Uruguayan basketball player (1928–2018)

Medal record
Men's basketball
Representing Uruguay
Olympic Games
Bronze medal – third place	1952 Helsinki	Team competition

Enrique Baliño Pavón (20 June 1928 in Montevideo – 14 October 2018) was a Uruguayan basketball player who competed in the 1952 Summer Olympics. Balino was a member of the Uruguayan team, which won the bronze medal. He played in all eight matches. Baliño died on October 14, 2018, at the age of 90.
