= Iván Olivares =

Venezuelan basketball player (born 1961)

Iván José Olivares Alvárez (born 10 December 1961 in Caracas) is a Venezuelan former basketball player who competed in the 1992 Summer Olympics. He is considered one of the greatest Venezuelan basketball players of all time.

== Career ==
In addition to the Olympics, he represented his country at the 1990 FIBA World Championship and 1991 South American Basketball Championship.

Olivares played for Springfield College in Massachusetts, earning NCAA Division II All-American honors in 1986. That season, he broke the school record for points in a season with 832. In 1998, he became the first Latino to be inducted into the NCAA Hall of Fame.

After college, he played for the Gaiteros del Zulia, Cocodrilos de Caracas and Trotamundos de Carabobo in Venezuela's Liga Profesional de Baloncesto, winning five league titles with the Trotamundos (1986–89, 1994) as well as the 1988 and 1989 editions of the South American Club Championship. He led the league in scoring in 1994 while teaming with American import Stanley Brundy. He also played in Colombia with Leopardos de Bucaramanga, leading the team in scoring and rebounding in 1988, in addition to stints in Brazil and Argentina. His two sons (Alberto Olivares Bastardo) that lives in U.S and (José Freites Bastardo) that was one of the greatest promises in Venezuela to reach the NBA at the time, it is unknown why he did not follow in his father's footsteps.
