= Adolfo Lubnicki =

Argentine-Uruguayan basketball player

Personal information
- Born: 25 July 1933 Charata, Argentina
- Died: 2 April 2015 (aged 81)
- Listed height: 191 cm (6 ft 3 in)
Medals
Men's basketball
Representing Argentina
Pan American Games
Silver medal – second place	1955 Mexico City	Team

Adolfo Lubnicki Kolton (Note: In this Spanish name, the first or paternal surname is Lubnicki and the second or maternal family name is Kolton.) (25 July 1933 – 2 April 2015) was an Argentine and later Uruguayan basketball player who competed in the 1960 Summer Olympics. He was born in Charata, Argentina.
