= Facundo Piñero =

Argentine basketball player

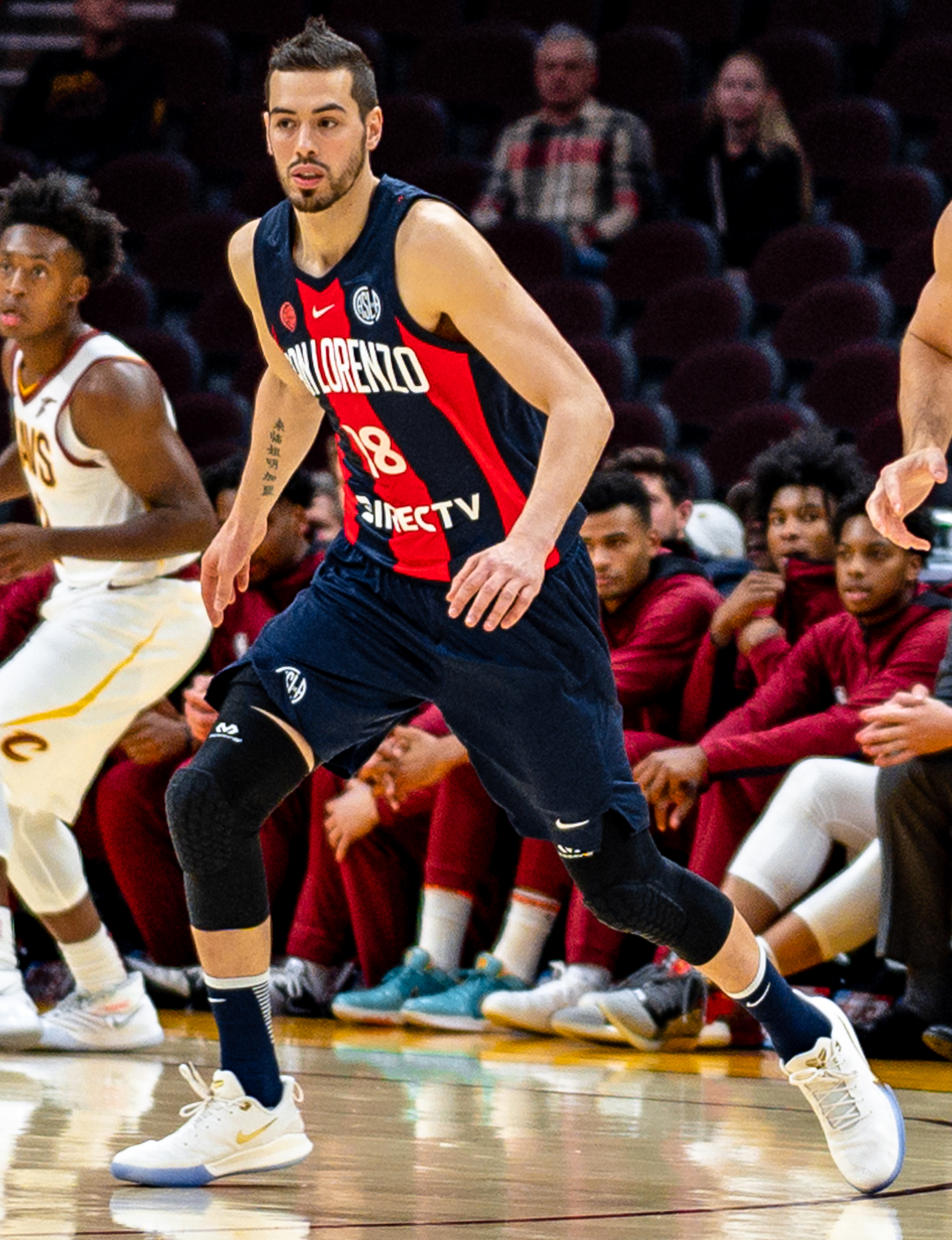
- Piñero with San Lorenzo in 2019

No. 10 – Boca Juniors
- Position: Center
- League: Liga Nacional de Básquet

Personal information
- Born: 26 September 1988 (age 36); Mar del Plata, Argentina
- Listed height: 6 ft 8 in (2.03 m)
- Listed weight: 260 lb (118 kg)

Career information
- Playing career: 2005–present

Career history
- 2005–2012: Quilmes de Mar del Plata
- 2012–2013: San Isidro
- 2015–2017: La Unión
- 2017–2019: Instituto
- 2020–2021: San Lorenzo
- 2021: Fuerza Regia
- 2021–2024: Regatas Corrientes
- 2024-present: Boca Juniors

Facundo Piñero (born 26 September 1988) is an Argentinian basketball player for Boca Juniors of the Argentine Basketball League. He is 1.98 m (6 ft 6 in) tall and he plays the center position.

== Career ==
In 2015, Piñero played for La Unión de Formosa.

On 13 July 2019, Piñero signed with defending Argentine champions San Lorenzo.
