= Leandro Palladino =

Argentine-Italian basketball player

Personal information
- Born: January 13, 1976 (age 50) Concepción del Uruguay, Argentina
- Listed height: 6 ft 4.75 in (1.95 m)
- Listed weight: 223 lb (101 kg)

Career information
- Playing career: 1994–2009
- Position: Shooting guard / small forward

Career history
- 1994–2000: Atenas de Córdoba
- 2000–2001: Viola Reggio Calabria
- 2001–2002: Pompea Napoli
- 2002–2003: Tau Cerámica
- 2003–2005: Tenerife CB
- 2005: Club Sportivo Ben Hur
- 2006: Cimberio Novara
- 2006: PBC CSKA Sofia
- 2006–2007: Central Entrerriano
- 2007: Boca Juniors
- 2007–2008: Atenas de Córdoba
- 2008–2009: Tomás de Rocamora
Medals
Men's basketball
Representing Argentina
FIBA World Cup
Silver medal – second place	2002 Indianapolis

Leandro Fabián Palladino (born January 13, 1976) is a retired Argentine-Italian professional basketball player.

== Professional career ==
In his pro career, Palladino played in the Argentine League, the Spanish League, the Italian League, and the EuroLeague.

== National team career ==
Palladino was a member of the senior men's Argentine national team. With them he won a silver medal at the 2002 FIBA World Championship.
