= Enrique Tucuna =

Uruguayan basketball player (born 1968)

Enrique Tucuna (born 6 August 1968) is an Uruguayan former basketball player.
