= Joélcio Joerke =

Brazilian basketball player

Personal information
- Born: 24 August 1972 (age 52); Campo Grande, Brazil

Joélcio "Janjão" Joerke, also known simply as "Janjão" (born 24 August 1972) is a Brazilian former professional basketball player. With the senior Brazilian national basketball team, Joerke competed at the 1994 FIBA World Cup, the 1996 Summer Olympics, and the 1998 FIBA World Cup.
