= Marcelo Milanesio =

Argentine basketball player

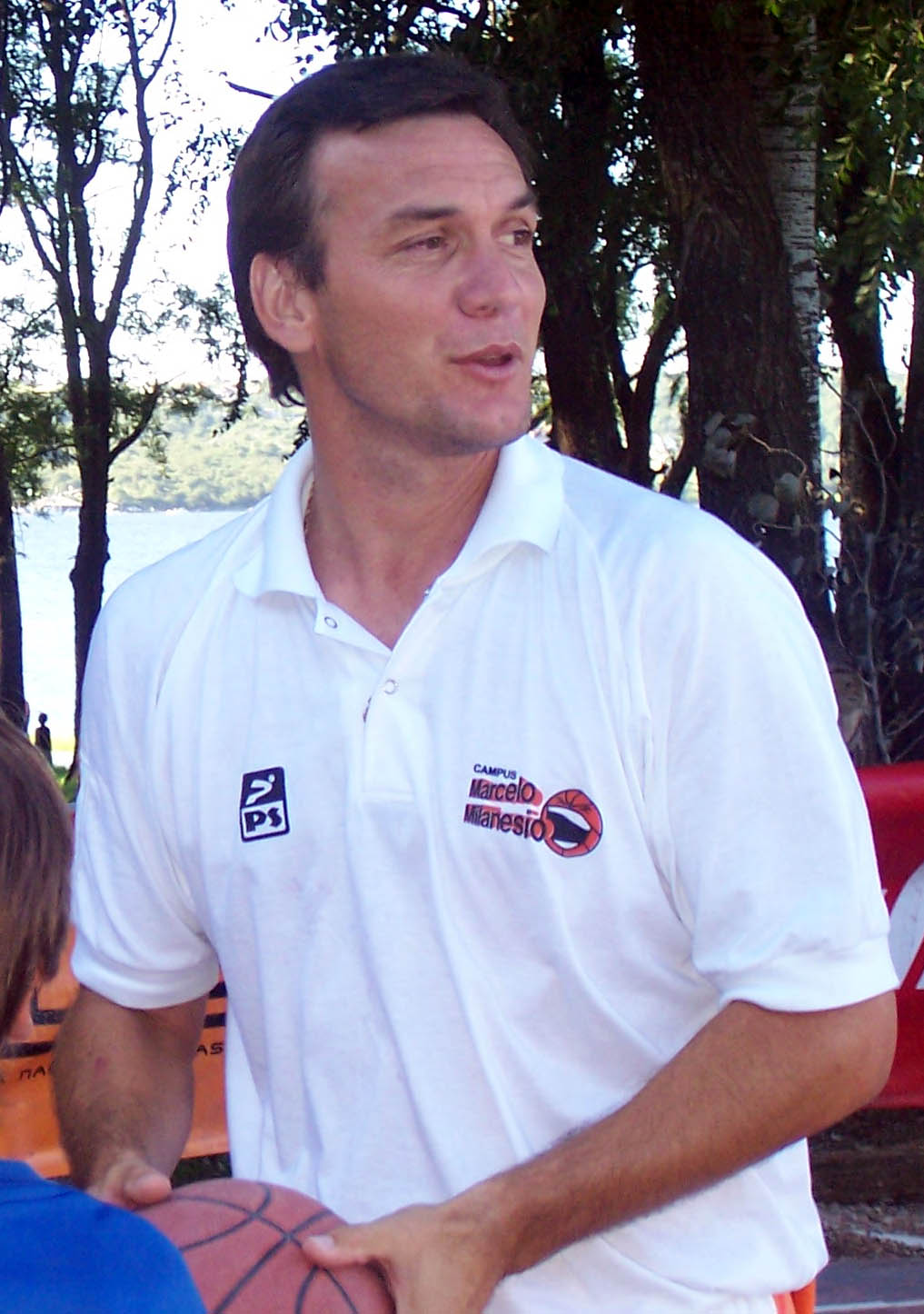
- Milanesio at a basketball campus in 2006

Personal information
- Born: February 11, 1965 (age 61) Córdoba, Argentina
- Listed height: 1.88 m (6 ft 2 in)

Career information
- Playing career: 1982–2002
- Position: Point guard
- Number: 9

Career history
- 1982–2002: Atenas

Career highlights
- 2× FIBA South American League champion (1997, 1998); 2× South American Club Championship champion (1993, 1994); 7× Argentine League champion (1987, 1988, 1990, 1992, 1998, 1999, 2002); 2× Argentine League MVP (1992, 1994); Argentine League Finals MVP (1990); N° 9 retired by Atenas (2002)
Medals
Men's basketball
Representing Argentina
FIBA AmeriCup
Bronze medal – third place	1993 San Juan
Silver medal – second place	1995 Neuquén
FIBA South American Championship
Gold medal – first place	1987 Asunción
Silver medal – second place	1989 Guayaquil
Bronze medal – third place	1991 Valencia
Silver medal – second place	1993 Guaratinguetá
Silver medal – second place	1995 Montevideo
Pan American Games
Gold medal – first place	1995 Mar del Plata

Marcelo Gustavo Milanesio (born February 11, 1965, in Hernando, Córdoba) is an Argentine former professional basketball player. A significant figure in Argentine basketball, he defended Argentina for 2 titles, and Atenas for 14 club titles. He was twice named MVP. He was the player with most assists at the 1994 FIBA World Cup. A one club man, he played all his professional life with Atenas.

== Playing career ==
=== Clubs ===
Milanesio began basketball at the Military Factory of Río Tercero, where he was affectionately known as "Tachuela". He and his brother Mario joined club Atenas in 1982 and debuted in the senior squad on June 2, in a match of local league "Torneo León Zakalian" organised by the Argentine Basketball Association. In that game Atenas beat Unión San Vicente, and Milanesio scored 4 points. His brother Mario also debuted that same night playing for Atenas, and was the topscorer of the match with 22 points.

The first official game for Atenas came on August 9, when they beat Club Argentino of Villa Cabrera 108–51, with Milanesio scoring 16 points. Milanesio's first title came in 1983, when Atenas won the Córdoba Basketball Association championship.

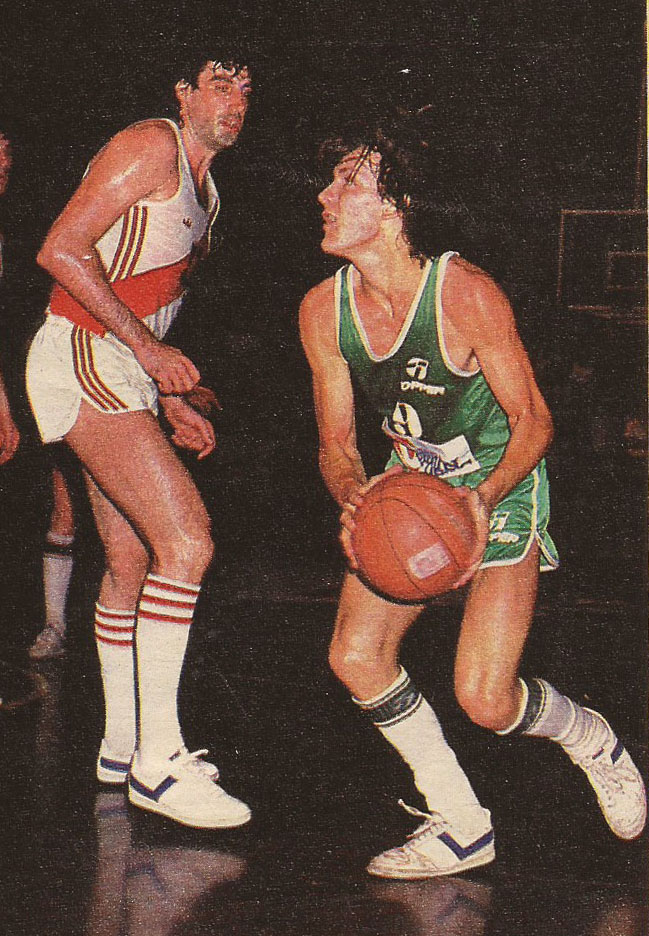
(left): Milanesio (#9) playing for Atenas v River Plate, 1985; (right): Milanesio (#9) with the Argentine side in 1992

It was in 1984 that the then-National League transitioned to the "Liga Nacional de Básquetbol", when Atenas lost the semifinals to River Plate, being eliminated. One year later, the first season of LNB started. Atenas qualified for the finals, then losing to Ferro Carril Oeste 2–1, after the third game ended 95–86 for FCO. At the end of the season, Milanesio had played 37 matches and scored 415 points (an average of 11,12). It would be the first of his 649 consecutive games played for Atenas. In the next season, Atenas was eliminated by Ferro C.O. in semifinals after a 3–2 score.

He suffered an injury before the beginning of the 1998–99 season that benched for the first time in his career. When he returned to play, Atenas won a championship. He never played for the national team after his injury. In 2002, he retired from professional basketball, with 14 Championships with Atenas, and 2 with the national team.

Known for his efficiency of external shots, he reached an average point score of 43.9% for three in the 848 matches in the 18 seasons he was with Atenaso, the first 649 without missing a side match.

His community activities gave him public and institutional recognition. He was declared illustrious citizen of the cities of Hernando, Río Tercero, San Marcos Sierra and Córdoba. In 1993 he was honored with the inaugural "decade" Golden Olimpia Award for Basketball, ten years later it was given to Emanuel Ginóbili.

=== Argentina national team ===
Milanesio defended Argentina and won the 1987 South American Championship in Asunción, Paraguay. He was Argentina's main point guard, at the 1990 FIBA World Championship, hosted by Argentina. Argentina brought home their inaugural gold medal at the 1995 Pan American Games, having defeated the Team USA, in the final of the 1995 Pan American Games, in Mar del Plata, Argentina.

== Coaching career ==
Milanesio currently works on sharing his experience and knowledge of the game. In 2004, he organised his first National Campus at Villa Carlos Paz, which has since successfully repeated every year, and receive around 150 children and teenagers from Argentina, and from neighbouring Bolivia and Chile.

In August 2010, Milanesio was designated as assistant coach to and helper of Sergio Hernández to the Argentina national basketball team, preparing for the 2010 FIBA World Championship, in Turkey.

== Career ==
=== Clubs ===
- Atenas (C) (Argentina): 1984–2002
  - Games Played: 848 (649 consecutive)
  - Total Points: 10,835

=== International ===
- Argentina National Team: 1986–1998
  - Games Played: 125
  - Total Points:

== Honours and awards ==
=== Championships ===
==== Clubs ====
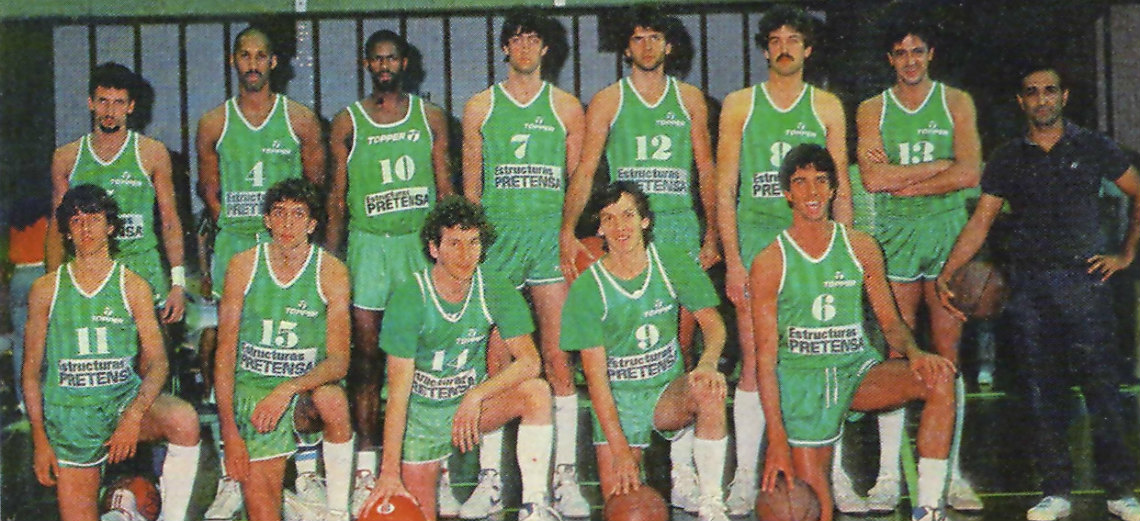
The 1987 roster that won the first LNB title for the club, with Milanesio (9) being part of the team

- Liga Nacional: 1987, 1988, 1990, 1991–92, 1997–98, 1998–99, 2001–02
- Liga Sudamericana: 1997, 1998
- Sudamericano de Clubes: 1993, 1994
- Panamericano de Clubes: 1996
- Copa de Campeones: 1998, 1999
- Atenas International: 1998, 1999, 2001

==== Argentina national team ====
- Sudamericano, Asunción, (Paraguay): 1987
- Panamericano, Mar del Plata, (Argentina): 1995
- Acropolis Cup, (Greece): 1990

=== Individual Honors ===
- LNB:
  - 848 games played in the Argentine League, also has the record of consecutive games played (649).
  - Selected to the Argentine League All-Star Game: 1988–90, 1992–93, 1995–2000
  - MVP of the finals: 1990
  - MVP of the regular season: 1991–92, 1993–94
  - MVP of the Argentine League All-Star Game: 2002
  - 3 Point Competition Winner Argentine All-Star Game: 1990, 1993
  - Jersey number 9 (which Milanesio wore during his whole career) was retired by Atenas, the only club team where he played: (2002)
- Olimpia de Oro Award (for "sportsman of the year" in Argentina): 1993 (given for the first time to a basketball player)
- Olimpia de Plata Award (for "basketball player of the year" in Argentina): 1990, 1993, 1994
- Argentine player that played in the most FIBA World Cups: 1986, 1990, 1994, 1998
- His jersey that he wore in the 1994 FIBA World Cup, was placed in the Basketball Hall of Fame.

Awards
Preceded by (Argentina) Diego Degano	Olimpia de Oro; 1993	Succeeded by (Argentina) Julio César Vásquez
