= Maury de Souza =

Brazilian basketball player (born 1962)

Maury Ponikwar de Souza
Personal information
- Born: 2 September 1962 (age 64) Campinas, Brazil
- Listed height: 6 ft 2.75 in (1.90 m)
- Listed weight: 185 lb (84 kg)
- Position: Point guard

Career highlights
- 2× South American Club champion (1986, 1987); 5× Brazilian champion (1983, 1985, 1986 (I), 1986 (II), 1987)

Maury Ponikwar de Souza (born 2 September 1962), commonly known as Maury de Souza, or simply Maury, is a Brazilian former professional basketball player.

== Professional career ==
During his pro club career, de Souza won 5 Brazilian Championships, in the seasons 1983, 1985, 1986 (I), 1986 (II), and 1987.

== National team career ==
With the senior Brazilian national basketball team, De Souza competed at the 1982 FIBA World Cup, the 1986 FIBA World Cup, the 1988 Summer Olympics, the 1990 FIBA World Cup, the 1992 Summer Olympics, and the 1994 FIBA World Cup.

== Personal ==
De Souza is the younger brother of Marcel de Souza, who is also a Brazilian former professional basketball player.
