= Sam Shepherd (basketball) =

American-Venezuelan basketball player

Sam Shepherd (born April 21, 1953 in La Grange, North Carolina), also known as El Mago, is an American/Venezuelan former professional basketball player who played for the Venezuelan basketball team in the 1992 Summer Olympics and world games in 1990, and for Colombian professional teams. He also went to two NBA camps for Washington Bullets tryouts and ABA Baltimore Claws. Throughout his long professional career, he scored more than 30,000 points and won more than 20 International Tournaments, in addition to holding the record for 20 years for most three-pointers made in a game 14 and more than 25 games scoring more than 50 points only player to average 52 points in tournament with Brazil, Dominican Republic, and Colombia.

== Basketball career ==
He attended Delaware State University, where he excelled in basketball for the Hornets. He is member of Delaware State University sports Hall of Fame and Hall of Fame in South America and Hall of Fame North Lenoir High school. He played until 1975, at Delaware State University and after unsuccessful tryouts for NBA and ABA teams, he decided to go to Venezuela and play at the Liga Especial de Basket. Likewise, he later played for the Colombian basketball team Lotería de Cucuta from 1978 to 1982, where he won four national championships (between 1978 and 1982) and Lotería de Valle in Cali Colombia (1) Championship and Barranquilla runner up finalist (1) year also Icollantas Copa sprite in Bogotá (1) year 4 South American championships.

Shepherd played professionally in Venezuela from 1975 to 1997, earning seven national titles and thirteen other International titles in 1977 average 50 points in Feria Sebastian tournament against Brazil, Dominican Republic and Colombia and held record for most 3 pointers made in a game in South America 14 . And In Colombia 7 years with 5 national titles . There, he played on various teams in the Liga Profesional de Baloncesto, including Trotamundos de Carabobo, Panteras del Táchira, and Guaiqueríes de Margarita. His rise to fame there earned him the nickname "El Mago". He represented Venezuela at world games in Argentina in 1990, and later led the national team to a silver medal at the 1992 Tournament of the Americas in Portland Oregon and Olympics Barcelona Spain 1992 against the dream team and 1992 Olympic Games in Barcelona Spain

== Personal life ==
He was born and grew up at La Grange, North Carolina. He married Janis Williams-Shepherd. He has a daughter, Gwendolyn, who attended and graduated from Temple University, and another daughter, Frinè, in Venezuela, who attended university de Católica del Táchira and graduated, his grandson Dorian, his grandson, Darrell, graduated Penn State. His son, Sam Jr. (born 1991), who inherited his father's love of basketball, won the Central American University Games.
