= Rostyn González =

Venezuelan basketball player

Rostin González (born 14 February 1964) is a Venezuelan former basketball player who competed in the 1992 Summer Olympics.
