= Wilson Minuci =

Brazilian basketball player

Personal information
- Born: 14 February 1969 (age 57) São Paulo, Brazil
- Listed height: 6 ft 6.75 in (2.00 m)
- Listed weight: 200 lb (91 kg)
- Position: Small forward

Wilson Fernando Kuhn Minuci, commonly known as Fernando Minuci (alternate spelling: Minucci; born 14 February 1969), is a Brazilian former professional basketball player.

== National team career ==
With the senior Brazilian national basketball team, Minuci competed at the 1990 FIBA World Cup, the 1992 Summer Olympics, the 1994 FIBA World Cup, and the 1996 Summer Olympics.
