= Gustavo Szczygielski =

Uruguayan basketball player

Gustavo Szczygielski (born 28 September 1967) is a Uruguayan former basketball player.
