= Club Sportivo Independiente =

Independiente (Gral. Pico)
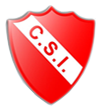
- Nickname: Rojo de La Pampa
- Leagues: Liga Pampeana de Basquet
- Founded: August 20, 1920; 105 years ago
- Location: General Pico, La Pampa Province
Home	Away

Club Sportivo Independiente, also known as Independiente de General Pico, is an Argentine sports club based in General Pico, La Pampa Province. Although many sports are practised at the club, Independiente was mostly known for its basketball team, which won one Liga Nacional de Básquet title and was also runner-up three times.

Apart from basketball, the club hosts other sports such as association football, team handball and volleyball.

== History ==
Independiente (nicknamed El Rojo, like its homonym from Avellaneda, Buenos Aires) was founded on August 20, 1920, an soon began to host many sports activities, such as football, tennis, basketball, golf, among others.

Independiente's basketball team gained recognition in the 1990s, having won 1 national title (during the 1994-95 season) and reaching the finals 3 times. Some of the team's notable players of those years in the first division were a young Andrés Nocioni, along with veterans Miguel Cortijo and Hernán Montenegro. But the high costs that required a professional basketball team playing at the highest level, originated some financial problems to the club, which finally decided to disaffiliate from the Liga Nacional.

As a result, professional basketball was dissolved. Nowadays the club hosts the practise of basketball only as an amateur activity, mainly focused on children.

=== Honours ===
- Liga Nacional de Básquet (1):

1994-95

- Liga Sudamericana (1):

1996

The team also reached the finals in 1993-94, 1996–97, 1998-99 seasons, although was defeated by Peñarol, Boca Juniors and Atenas respectively.

=== Notable players ===
Note: Flags indicate national team eligibility at FIBA-sanctioned events. Players may hold other non-FIBA nationalities not displayed.

Criteria

To appear in this section a player must have either:

- Set a club record or won an individual award while at the club
- Played at least one official international match for their national team at any time
- Played at least one official NBA match at any time.

- Andrés Nocioni (1997–99)
- Hernán Montenegro (1997–98)
- Ime Udoka (2001)
