= Luis Villar =

Argentine basketball player

Luis Emilio Villar (born March 15, 1967, in Carrilobo, Córdoba) is a retired male basketball player (2.03 metres) from Argentina, who competed for his native country at the 1996 Summer Olympics in Atlanta, Georgia, finishing in ninth place in the overall-rankings. He was nicknamed "Mili" during his career.
