= Puerto Rico at the 1992 Summer Olympics =

- IOC code: PUR
- NOC: Puerto Rico Olympic Committee

in Barcelona
- Competitors: 71 in 12 sports
- Flag bearer: Luis Martínez
- Medals Ranked 54th: Gold 0 Silver 0 Bronze 1 Total 1

Summer Olympics appearances (overview)
- 1948; 1952; 1956; 1960; 1964; 1968; 1972; 1976; 1980; 1984; 1988; 1992; 1996; 2000; 2004; 2008; 2012; 2016; 2020; 2024; 2028

Puerto Rico competed at the 1992 Summer Olympics in Barcelona, Spain.

== Medalists ==
Medal	Name	Sport	Event	Date
Bronze	Aníbal Acevedo	Boxing	Welterweight	6 August

== Competitors ==
The following is the list of number of competitors in the Games.

Sport	Men	Women	Total
Athletics	6	1	7
Baseball	20	–	20
Basketball	12	0	12
Boxing	8	–	8
Gymnastics	1	0	1
Judo	1	3	4
Sailing	3	1	4
Shooting	2	0	2
Swimming	5	1	6
Tennis	2	0	2
Weightlifting	1	–	1
Wrestling	4	–	4
Total	65	6	71

== Results by event ==
=== Athletics ===
Men's 200 metres

- Edgardo Guilbe

Men's Marathon

- Jorge González

Men's 400m Hurdles

- Domingo Cordero

- Heat — 50.19 (→ did not advance, no ranking)

Men's Long Jump

- Michael Francis

- Qualification — 7.47 m (→ did not advance)

- Elmer Williams

- Qualification — 7.70 m (→ did not advance)

Men's Pole Vault

- Edgar Díaz

- Qualification — 5.50 m (→ did not advance)

Women's 100 metres

- Myra Mayberry-Wilkinson

Women's 400 metres

- Myra Mayberry-Wilkinson

=== Baseball ===
==== Men's team competition ====
The Puerto Ricans won only two of the seven games of the preliminary round in the debut of Olympic baseball. Their victories came against Italy and the Dominican Republic, while the five losses included one against last-place Spain after the Dominicans lost their 6-4 lead in the bottom of the ninth. Their record in the preliminary round eliminated them from medal contention.

- Preliminary round

- Lost to Japan (0:9)
- Defeated Dominican Republic (7:5)
- Lost to Chinese Taipei (1:10)
- Defeated Italy (2:0)
- Lost to United States (2:8)
- Lost to Cuba (4:9)
- Lost to Spain(6:7) → 5th place

- Team roster:

- Jorge Aranzamendi Torres
- Roberto Lopez Ocasio
- Angel Morales Rodriguez
- Efrain Garcia Santiago
- Helson Rodriguez Santiago
- Albert Bracero Chevere
- Manuel Serrano
- José Lorenzana Oquendo
- Luis Ramos Torres
- Silvio Censale
- Abimael Rosario Marrero
- Efrain Nieves Soto
- Gualberto Lopez Ortiz
- Wilfredo Velez Leon
- James Figueroa
- Rafael Santiago Rivera
- Jesus Feliciano Amadeo
- José Mateo Rosario
- Orlando Lopez Bobian
- José Sepulveda Pinto

Head coach: José Carradero Muriel

=== Basketball ===
==== Men's team competition ====
- Preliminary round (group B):

- Lost to Australia (76-116)
- Defeated China (100-68)
- Lost to Lithuania (91-104)
- Defeated Venezuela (96-82)
- Defeated Unified Team (82-70)

- Quarter Finals:

- Lost to United States (77-115)

- Classification Matches:

- 5th/8th place: Lost to Brazil (84-86)
- 7th/8th place: Lost to Germany (86-96) → 8th place

- Team roster:

- ( 4.) José Ortiz
- ( 5.) Federico Lopez
- ( 6.) Raymond Gause
- ( 7.) Edwin Pellot
- ( 8.) Jerome Mincy
- ( 9.) James Carter
- (10.) Javier Antonio Colón
- (11.) Ramon Rivas
- (12.) Mario Morales
- (13.) Edgar De Leon
- (14.) Eddie Casiano
- (15.) Richard Soto

=== Boxing ===
Men's Light Flyweight (– 48 kg)

- Nelson Dieppa

- First Round — Lost to Daniel Petrov (BUL), 7:10

Men's Flyweight (– 51 kg)

- Angel Chacón

- First Round — Lost to David Serradas (VEN), 3:12

Men's Bantamweight (– 54 kg)

- Harold Ramírez

- First Round — Lost to Sergio Reyes Jr. (USA), 1:10

Men's Featherweight (– 57 kg)

- Carlos Gerena

- First Round — Defeated Narendar Singh Bisth (USA), 20:11
- Second Round — Lost to Hocine Soltani (ALG), 0:23

Men's Welterweight (– 67 kg)

- Aníbal Acevedo

- First Round — Defeated Harry Simon (NAM), 13:11
- Second Round — Defeated Stefan Scriggins (AUS), 16:3
- Quarterfinals — Defeated Francisc Vaştag (ROM), 20:9
- Semifinals — Lost to Juan Hernández Sierra (CUB), 2:11 → Bronze Medal

Men's Light-Middleweight (– 71 kg)

- Miguel Jiménez

- First Round — Lost to Furas Hashim (IRQ), 3:10

Men's Middleweight (– 75 kg)

- Richard Santiago

- First Round — Lost to Sven Ottke (GER), 2:15

Men's Light-Heavyweight (– 81 kg)

- Alex González

- First Round — Lost to Wojciech Bartnik (POL), 3:6

=== Gymnastics ===
Men's Floor Exercise

- Victor Colon

Men's Horse Vault

- Victor Colon

Men's Parallel Bars

- Victor Colon

Men's Horizontal Bar

- Victor Colon

Men's Rings

- Victor Colon

Men's Pommelled Horse

- Victor Colon

=== Judo ===
Men's Extra-Lightweight

- Luis Martínez

Women's Half-Lightweight

- Lisa Boscarino

Women's Lightweight

- Maniliz Segarra

Women's Heavyweight

- Nilmaris Santini

=== Sailing ===
Men's One Person Dinghy

- José Sambolin

Mixed Multihull

- Enrique Figueroa and Oscar Mercado

Women's Sailboard (Lechner A-390)

- Lucia Martínez

- Final Ranking — 205.0 points (→ 19th place)

=== Shooting ===
Men's Small-Bore Rifle Prone (50 m)

- Ralph Rodríguez

Mixed Trap

- Jesús Tirado

=== Swimming ===
Men's 50 m Freestyle

- Ricardo Busquets

- Heat — 23.44 (→ did not advance, 24th place)

- Todd Torres

- Heat — 23.79 (→ did not advance, 34th place)

Men's 100 m Freestyle

- Ricardo Busquets

- Heat — 50.31
- B-Final — 49.92 (→ 9th place)

Men's 400 m Freestyle

- Jorge Herrera

- Heat — 4:00.11 (→ did not advance, 30th place)

Men's 1500 m Freestyle

- Jorge Herrera

- Heat — 16:01.69 (→ did not advance, 24th place)

Men's 100 m Backstroke

- Manuel Guzmán

- Heat — 56.93 (→ did not advance, 17th place)

- Ricardo Busquets

- Heat — 58.42 (→ did not advance, 38th place)

Men's 200 m Backstroke

- Manuel Guzmán

- Heat — 2:01.84
- B-Final — 2:01.87 (→ 13th place)

Men's 100 m Breaststroke

- Todd Torres

- Heat — 1:02.72
- B-Final — 1:03.21 (→ 16th place)

Men's 200 m Butterfly

- David Monasterio

- Heat — 2:02.32 (→ did not advance, 30th place)

Men's 200 m Individual Medley

- Manuel Guzmán

- Heat — 2:04.95
- B-Final — Withdrawn

Men's 400 m Individual Medley

- David Monasterio

- Heat — 4:36.39 (→ did not advance, 28th place)

Men's 4 × 100 m Freestyle Relay

- Manuel Guzmán, Jorge Herrera, David Monasterio, and Ricardo Busquets

- Heat — 3:30.48 (→ did not advance, 13th place)

Men's 4 × 200 m Freestyle Relay

- Jorge Herrera, Manuel Guzmán, Ricardo Busquets, and David Monasterio

- Heat — 7:35.63 (→ did not advance, 15th place)

Men's 4 × 100 m Medley Relay

- Manuel Guzmán, Todd Torres, David Monasterio, and Ricardo Busquets

- Heat — 3:46.52 (→ did not advance, 12th place)

Women's 200 m Freestyle

- Rita Garay

- Heat — 2:07.08 (→ did not advance, 27th place)

Women's 100 m Backstroke

- Rita Garay

- Heat — 1:05.92 (→ did not advance, 34th place)

Women's 200 m Backstroke

- Rita Garay

- Heat — 2:18.10 (→ did not advance, 27th place)

=== Tennis ===
Men's Singles Competition

- Juan Rios

- First round — Lost to Omar Camporese (Italy) 2-6, 2-6, 0-6

Men's Doubles Competition

- Juan Rios and Miguel Nido

- First round — Lost to Omar Camporese and Diego Nargiso (Italy) 1-6, 2-6, 3-6

=== Weightlifting ===
Men's Light-Heavyweight

- Arnold Franqui

=== Wrestling ===
Men's Freestyle Featherweight

- Anibál Nieves

Men's Freestyle Middleweight

- José Betancourt

Men's Freestyle Light-Heavyweight

- Daniel Sánchez

Men's Freestyle Super-Heavyweight

- Rodney Figueroa

== See also ==
- Puerto Rico at the 1991 Pan American Games
