= Puerto Rico at the 1991 Pan American Games =

- IOC code: PUR
- NOC: Puerto Rico Olympic Committee

in Havana 8–18 August 1991
- Medals Ranked 9th: Gold 3 Silver 13 Bronze 11 Total 27

Pan American Games appearances (overview)
- 1951; 1955; 1959; 1963; 1967; 1971; 1975; 1979; 1983; 1987; 1991; 1995; 1999; 2003; 2007; 2011; 2015; 2019; 2023; 2027

The 11th Pan American Games were held in Havana, Cuba from August 2 to August 18, 1991.

== Medals ==
=== Gold ===
===== Basketball =====
- Men's Team Competition: Puerto Rico national basketball team

- José Ortiz, Federico López, Raymond Gause, Edwin Pellot, Jerome Mincy, James Carter, Javier Antonio Colón, Ramón Rivas, Mario Morales, Edgar Leon, Pablo Alicea, and Richard Soto

===== Judo =====
- Men's Flyweight (– 56 kg): Luis Martínez

===== Tennis =====
- Men's Doubles: Miguel Nido and Joey Rivé

=== Silver ===
===== Baseball =====
- Men's Team Competition: Puerto Rico national baseball team

===== Boxing =====
- Men's Bantamweight (– 54 kg): Carlos Gerena
- Men's Light-Middleweight (– 71 kg): Miguel Jiménez
- Men's Super Heavyweight (+ 91 kg): Harold Arroyo

===== Judo =====
- Women's Heavyweight (+ 72 kg): Nilmaris Santini
- Women's Open Class: Nilmaris Santini

===== Swimming =====
- Men's 400m Freestyle: Jorge Herrera
- Men's 1500m Freestyle: Jorge Herrera
- Men's 100m Breaststroke: Todd Torres
- Men's 200m Individual Medley: Manuel Guzmán
- Men's 4x100m Medley: David Monasterio, Jorge Herrera, Todd Torres, and Ricardo Busquets

===== Tennis =====
- Men's Team: Puerto Rico

- Miguel Nido, Joey Rivé, and Jaime Frontera

===== Wrestling =====
- Men's Freestyle (– 62 kg): Anibal Nieves

=== Bronze ===
===== Boxing =====
- Men's Light Flyweight (– 48 kg): Nelson Dieppa
- Men's Light Welterweight (– 63.5 kg): Aníbal Santiago Acevedo
- Men's Middleweight (– 75 kg): Richard Santiago

===== Gymnastics =====
- Men's Vault: Victor Colon

===== Judo =====
- Women's Half Lightweight (– 52 kg): Lisa Boscarino
- Women's Lightweight (– 56 kg): Maniliz Segarra

===== Swimming =====
- Men's 200m Backstroke: Manuel Guzmán
- Men's 4x100m Freestyle: David Monasterio, Jorge Herrera, Manuel Guzmán, and Ricardo Busquets
- Men's 4x200m Freestyle: David Monasterio, Jorge Herrera, Manuel Guzmán, and Ricardo Busquets

===== Tennis =====
- Mixed Doubles: Jaime Frontera and Emilie Viqueira

== See also ==
- Puerto Rico at the 1990 Central American and Caribbean Games
- Puerto Rico at the 1992 Summer Olympics
