= Basketball at the 1992 Summer Olympics – Men's team rosters =

Twelve men's teams competed in basketball at the 1992 Summer Olympics.

== Group A ==
=== Angola ===
Angola men's national basketball team roster
Players
Coaches

Pos.	No.	Name	Age – Date of birth	Height	Club	Ctr.
G	4	Benjamim Romano	22 – 19 August 1969
F	5	Aníbal Moreira	25 – 17 September 1966	1.93 m (6 ft 4 in)
F	6	Ângelo Victoriano	24 – 8 February 1968	1.96 m (6 ft 5 in)
G	7	Benjamim Ucuahamba	27 – 27 April 1965
F	8	Herlander Coimbra	24 – 16 June 1968
G	9	Manuel Sousa	29 – 18 September 1962
G	10	Víctor de Carvalho	23 – 20 February 1969
C	11	Nelson Sardinha	26 – 28 June 1966
F	12	David Dias	23 – 21 April 1969	1.99 m (6 ft 6 in)
G	13	Paulo Macedo	24 – 28 May 1968
G	14	José Carlos Guimarães	28 – 9 April 1964		Benfica	(Portugal)
F	15	Jean-Jacques Conceição	28 – 3 April 1964		Benfica	(Portugal)

Head coach

- (Angola) Victorino Cunha

Legend

- Club – describes last
  club before the competition
- Age – describes age
  on 26 July 1992

=== Brazil ===
Brazil men's national basketball team roster
Players
Coaches

Pos.	No.	Name	Age – Date of birth	Height	Club	Ctr.
C	4	Paulinho Villas Boas	29 – 26 January 1963
G	5	Jorge Guerra	33 – 21 June 1959
F	6	Gerson Victalino	32 – 19 September 1959
F	7	João Vianna	28 – 15 November 1963		Dallas Mavericks	(United States)
C	8	Rolando Ferreira	28 – 24 May 1964		Corinthians	(Brazil)
G	9	Ricardo Cardoso Guimarães	32 – 4 October 1959		Palmeiras	(Brazil)
G	10	Maury de Souza	29 – 2 September 1962		All Star/Franca	(Brazil)
G	11	Marcel de Souza	35 – 4 December 1956		Corinthians	(Brazil)
C	12	Josuel dos Santos	22 – 14 June 1970	2.08 m (6 ft 10 in)
F	13	Fernando Minuci	23 – 14 February 1969
F	14	Oscar Schmidt	34 – 16 February 1958		Fernet Branca Pavia	(Italy)
C	15	Israel Andrade	32 – 17 January 1960		Marr Rimini	(Italy)

Head coach

- (Brazil) José Medalha

Legend

- Club – describes last
  club before the competition
- Age – describes age
  on 26 July 1992

=== Croatia ===
Croatia men's national basketball team roster
Players
Coaches

Pos.	No.	Name	Age – Date of birth	Height	Club	Ctr.
G	4	Dražen Petrović	27 – 22 October 1964	1.96 m (6 ft 5 in)	New Jersey Nets	(United States)
G	5	Velimir Perasović	27 – 9 February 1965	1.96 m (6 ft 5 in)	Slobodna Dalmacija Split	(Croatia)
G	6	Danko Cvjetićanin	28 – 16 October 1963	1.98 m (6 ft 6 in)	Cibona Zagreb	(Croatia)
F	7	Toni Kukoč	23 – 18 September 1968	2.11 m (6 ft 11 in)	Benetton Treviso	(Italy)
G	8	Vladan Alanović	25 – 3 July 1967	1.94 m (6 ft 4 in)	Cibona Zagreb	(Croatia)
C	9	Franjo Arapović	27 – 2 June 1965	2.15 m (7 ft 1 in)	Cibona Zagreb	(Croatia)
C	10	Žan Tabak	22 – 15 June 1970	2.13 m (7 ft 0 in)	Slobodna Dalmacija Split	(Croatia)
C	11	Stojan Vranković	28 – 22 January 1964	2.18 m (7 ft 2 in)	Boston Celtics	(United States)
G	12	Alan Gregov	22 – 1 April 1970		Zadar	(Croatia)
G	13	Arijan Komazec	22 – 23 January 1970	2.01 m (6 ft 7 in)	Zadar	(Croatia)
C	14	Dino Rađa	25 – 24 April 1967	2.11 m (6 ft 11 in)	Virtus Roma	(Italy)
PF	15	Aramis Naglić	26 – 28 August 1965	2.03 m (6 ft 8 in)	Slobodna Dalmacija Split	(Croatia)

Head coach

- (Croatia) Petar Skansi

Legend

- Club – describes last
  club before the competition
- Age – describes age
  on 26 July 1992

=== Germany ===
Germany men's national basketball team roster
Players
Coaches

Pos.	No.	Name	Age – Date of birth	Height	Club	Ctr.
C	4	Gunther Behnke	29 – 19 January 1963		Bayer Giants Leverkusen	(Germany)
G	5	Henrik Rödl	23 – 4 March 1969	2.00 m (6 ft 7 in)	North Carolina Tar Heels	(United States)
G	6	Armin Andres	33 – 5 April 1959		MTV 1846 Gießen	(Germany)
F	7	Stephan Baeck	27 – 12 April 1965	1.92 m (6 ft 4 in)	Bayer Giants Leverkusen	(Germany)
F	8	Arnd Neuhaus	24 – 26 September 1967		Brandt Hagen	(Germany)
F	9	Henning Harnisch	24 – 15 April 1968		Bayer Giants Leverkusen	(Germany)
C	10	Uwe Blab	30 – 26 March 1962		Alba Berlin	(Germany)
F	11	Detlef Schrempf	29 – 21 January 1963		Indiana Pacers	(United States)
C	12	Hans-Jürgen Gnad	29 – 4 June 1963	2.07 m (6 ft 9 in)	Billy Desio	(Italy)
G	13	Kai Nürnberger	26 – 7 June 1966		TTL Bamberg	(Germany)
C	14	Jens Kujawa	27 – 28 January 1965		BSG Basket Ludwigsburg	(Germany)
F	15	Michael Jackel	32 – 19 October 1959		TTL Bamberg	(Germany)

Head coach

- (Federal Republic of Yugoslavia) Svetislav Pešić

Legend

- Club – describes last
  club before the competition
- Age – describes age
  on 26 July 1992

=== Spain ===
Spain men's national basketball team roster
Players
Coaches

Pos.	No.	Name	Age – Date of birth	Height	Club	Ctr.
G	4	Jordi Villacampa	28 – 11 October 1963		Joventut Badalona	(Spain)
G	5	José Arcega	28 – 31 May 1964		CAI Zaragoza	(Spain)
G	6	José Biriukov	29 – 3 February 1963		Real Madrid	(Spain)
G	7	Rafael Jofresa	25 – 22 September 1966		Joventut Badalona	(Spain)
F	8	Andrés Jiménez	30 – 6 June 1962		FC Barcelona	(Spain)
C	9	Santiago Aldama	23 – 7 December 1968		CAI Zaragoza	(Spain)
G	10	Tomás Jofresa	22 – 25 January 1970		Joventut Badalona	(Spain)
F	11	Xavi Fernández	24 – 12 February 1968		León	(Spain)
G	12	Alberto Herreros	23 – 20 April 1969	2.00 m (6 ft 7 in)	Estudiantes	(Spain)
C	13	Juan Antonio Orenga	25 – 29 July 1966		Estudiantes	(Spain)
C	14	Enrique Andreu	24 – 20 October 1967		CAI Zaragoza	(Spain)
F	15	Juan Antonio San Epifanio	33 – 12 June 1959		FC Barcelona	(Spain)

Head coach

- (Spain) Antonio Díaz-Miguel

Legend

- Club – describes last
  club before the competition
- Age – describes age
  on 26 July 1992

=== United States ===
United States men's national basketball team roster
Players
Coaches

Pos.	No.	Name	Age – Date of birth	Height	Club	Ctr.
F	4	Christian Laettner	22 – 17 August 1969	2.11 m (6 ft 11 in)	Duke Blue Devils	(United States)
C	5	David Robinson	26 – 6 August 1965	2.16 m (7 ft 1 in)	San Antonio Spurs	(United States)
C	6	Patrick Ewing	29 – 5 August 1962	2.13 m (7 ft 0 in)	New York Knicks	(United States)
F	7	Larry Bird	35 – 7 December 1956	2.06 m (6 ft 9 in)	Boston Celtics	(United States)
F	8	Scottie Pippen	26 – 25 September 1965	2.03 m (6 ft 8 in)	Chicago Bulls	(United States)
G	9	Michael Jordan	29 – 17 February 1963	1.98 m (6 ft 6 in)	Chicago Bulls	(United States)
G/F	10	Clyde Drexler	30 – 22 June 1962	2.01 m (6 ft 7 in)	Portland Trail Blazers	(United States)
F	11	Karl Malone	29 – 24 July 1963	2.06 m (6 ft 9 in)	Utah Jazz	(United States)
G	12	John Stockton	30 – 26 March 1962	1.85 m (6 ft 1 in)	Utah Jazz	(United States)
G/F	13	Chris Mullin	28 – 30 July 1963	2.01 m (6 ft 7 in)	Golden State Warriors	(United States)
F	14	Charles Barkley	29 – 20 February 1963	1.98 m (6 ft 6 in)	Phoenix Suns	(United States)
G	15	Magic Johnson	32 – 14 August 1959	2.06 m (6 ft 9 in)	Los Angeles Lakers	(United States)

Head coach

- (United States) Chuck Daly

Assistant coach(es)

- (United States) P. J. Carlesimo
- (United States) Mike Krzyzewski
- (United States) Lenny Wilkens

Legend

- Club – describes last
  club before the competition
- Age – describes age
  on 26 July 1992

== Group B ==
=== Australia ===
Australia men's national basketball team roster
Players
Coaches

Pos.	No.	Name	Age – Date of birth	Height	Club	Ctr.
C	4	John Dorge	29 – 17 October 1962		South East Melbourne Magic	(Australia)
G/F	5	Michael McKay	26 – 15 October 1965		Adelaide 36ers	(Australia)
G	6	Phil Smyth	34 – 11 May 1958		Canberra Cannons	(Australia)
F	7	Larry Sengstock	32 – 4 March 1960		Gold Coast Rollers	(Australia)
G/F	8	Damian Keogh	30 – 1 February 1962		Sydney Kings	(Australia)
G/F	9	Leroy Loggins	34 – 20 December 1957		Brisbane Bullets	(Australia)
G	10	Andrew Gaze	27 – 24 July 1965	2.01 m (6 ft 7 in)	Rex Udine	(Italy)
G	11	Shane Heal	21 – 6 September 1970	1.83 m (6 ft 0 in)	Brisbane Bullets	(Australia)
C	12	Mark Bradtke	22 – 27 September 1969	2.09 m (6 ft 10 in)	Juver Murcia	(Spain)
C	13	Luc Longley	23 – 19 January 1969	2.18 m (7 ft 2 in)	Minnesota Timberwolves	(United States)
F	14	Andrew Vlahov	23 – 1 April 1969	2.00 m (6 ft 7 in)	Perth Wildcats	(Australia)
F/C	15	Ray Borner	30 – 27 May 1962		North Melbourne Giants	(Australia)

Head coach

- (Australia) Adrian Hurley

Legend

- Club – describes last
  club before the competition
- Age – describes age
  on 26 July 1992

=== China ===
China men's national basketball team roster
Players
Coaches

Pos.	No.	Name	Age – Date of birth	Height	Club	Ctr.
G	4	Adiljan Jun	24 – 21 August 1967
F	5	Li Chunjiang	29 – 11 March 1963		Liaoning Flying Leopards	(China)
C	6	Wang Zhidan	21 – 19 December 1970
F	7	Sun Jun	23 – 22 June 1969	1.97 m (6 ft 6 in)	Jilin Northeast Tigers	(China)
F	8	Hu Weidong	22 – 3 January 1970	1.98 m (6 ft 6 in)	Jiangsu Dragons	(China)
	9	Song Ligang	25 – 8 June 1967
G	10	Wu Qinglong	26 – 27 December 1965
G	11	Sun Fengwu	30 – 19 March 1962
F	12	Ma Jian	22 – 20 August 1969
G	13	Zhang Yongjun	29 – 4 January 1963
C	14	Shan Tao	22 – 30 May 1970
F/C	15	Gong Xiaobin	22 – 23 November 1969	2.02 m (6 ft 8 in)	Shandong Flaming Bulls	(China)

Head coach

- (China) Jiang Xingquan

Legend

- Club – describes last
  club before the competition
- Age – describes age
  on 26 July 1992

=== Lithuania ===
Lithuania men's national basketball team roster
Players
Coaches

Pos.	No.	Name	Age – Date of birth	Height	Club	Ctr.
G	4	Valdemaras Chomičius	33 – 4 May 1959		CAI Zaragoza	(Spain)
F	5	Alvydas Pazdrazdis	20 – 20 July 1972		Statyba Vilnius	(Lithuania)
F	6	Arūnas Visockas	26 – 7 December 1965		Žalgiris Kaunas	(Lithuania)
F	7	Darius Dimavičius	24 – 8 April 1968		Baník Cígeľ Prievidza	(Czechoslovakia)
C	8	Romanas Brazdauskis	28 – 20 February 1964		Adelaide 36ers	(Australia)
F	9	Gintaras Krapikas	31 – 6 July 1961
G	10	Rimas Kurtinaitis	32 – 15 May 1960		Žalgiris Kaunas	(Lithuania)
C	11	Arvydas Sabonis	27 – 19 December 1964	2.20 m (7 ft 3 in)	Forum Valladolid	(Spain)
F	12	Artūras Karnišovas	21 – 27 April 1971	2.04 m (6 ft 8 in)	Seton Hall Pirates	(United States)
G	13	Šarūnas Marčiulionis	28 – 13 June 1964		Golden State Warriors	(United States)
F/C	14	Gintaras Einikis	22 – 30 September 1969	2.07 m (6 ft 9 in)	Žalgiris Kaunas	(Lithuania)
G	15	Sergejus Jovaiša	37 – 17 December 1954		Brandt Hagen	(Germany)

Head coach

- (Lithuania) Vladas Garastas

Legend

- Club – describes last
  club before the competition
- Age – describes age
  on 26 July 1992

=== Puerto Rico ===
Puerto Rico men's national basketball team roster
Players
Coaches

Pos.	No.	Name	Age – Date of birth	Height	Club	Ctr.
F/C	4	José Ortiz	28 – 25 October 1963	2.11 m (6 ft 11 in)	FC Barcelona	(Spain)
G	5	Federico López	30 – 26 March 1962		Mets de Guaynabo	(Puerto Rico)
G	6	Raymond Gause	31 – 4 February 1961		Vaqueros de Bayamón	(Puerto Rico)
G/F	7	Edwin Pellot	29 – 13 June 1963		Gallitos de Isabela	(Puerto Rico)
F	8	Jerome Mincy	27 – 10 November 1964	2.00 m (6 ft 7 in)	Vaqueros de Bayamón	(Puerto Rico)
G	9	James Carter	28 – 27 March 1964	1.83 m (6 ft 0 in)	Brujos de Guayama	(Puerto Rico)
G	10	Antonio Colón	23 – 4 June 1969		Leones de Ponce	(Puerto Rico)
F/C	11	Ramón Rivas	26 – 13 March 1966	2.03 m (6 ft 8 in)	Taugrés	(Spain)
F	12	Mario Morales	34 – 13 November 1957		Mets de Guaynabo	(Puerto Rico)
F/C	13	Edgar de León	27 – 2 November 1964		Cariduros de Fajardo	(Puerto Rico)
G	14	Eddie Casiano	19 – 20 September 1972	1.92 m (6 ft 4 in)	Atléticos de San Germán	(Puerto Rico)
G	15	Richard Soto	23 – 4 November 1968	1.92 m (6 ft 4 in)	Taínos de Cabo Rojo	(Puerto Rico)

Head coach

- (Puerto Rico) Raymond Dalmau

Legend

- Club – describes last
  club before the competition
- Age – describes age
  on 26 July 1992

=== Unified Team ===
Unified Team men's national basketball team roster
Players
Coaches

Pos.	No.	Name	Age – Date of birth	Height	Club	Ctr.
G/F	4	Gundars Vētra	25 – 22 May 1967	1.96 m (6 ft 5 in)	VEF Rīga	(Latvia)
G	5	Sergei Bazarevich	27 – 16 March 1965	1.91 m (6 ft 3 in)	CSKA Moscow	(Russia)
G	6	Igors Miglinieks	28 – 4 May 1964		VEF Rīga	(Latvia)
G	7	Vladimir Gorin	31 – 13 March 1961		Spartak Saint Petersburg	(Russia)
F	8	Sergei Panov	22 – 30 June 1970	2.03 m (6 ft 8 in)	Spartak Saint Petersburg	(Russia)
F	9	Valeri Tikhonenko	27 – 19 August 1964	2.06 m (6 ft 9 in)	Unicaja Ronda	(Spain)
F	10	Viktor Berezhniy	31 – 20 February 1961		Kolej	(Turkey)
C	11	Vitaly Nosov	24 – 1 February 1968	2.12 m (6 ft 11 in)	Avtodor Saratov	(Russia)
C	12	Dmitri Sukharev	31 – 25 December 1960		Klosterneuburg Dukes	(Austria)
F	13	Elşad Qadaşev	24 – 1 May 1968		Dynamo Moscow	(Russia)
F/C	14	Alexander Volkov	28 – 29 March 1964		Atlanta Hawks	(United States)
C	15	Alexander Belostenny	33 – 24 February 1959		TBB Trier	(Germany)

Head coach

- (Russia) Yuri Selikhov

Legend

- Club – describes last
  club before the competition
- Age – describes age
  on 26 July 1992

=== Venezuela ===
Venezuela men's national basketball team roster
Players
Coaches

Pos.	No.	Name	Age – Date of birth	Height	Club	Ctr.
F	4	Víctor Díaz	24 – 4 February 1968	1.98 m (6 ft 6 in)	Houston Cougars	(United States)
G	5	David Díaz	27 – 6 September 1964	2.00 m (6 ft 7 in)	Cocodrilos de Caracas	(Venezuela)
C	6	Melquíades Jaramillo	25 – 11 January 1967
G	7	Nelson Solórzano	33 – 30 May 1959
F	8	Rostyn González	28 – 14 February 1964
	9	Luis Jiménez	30 – 21 January 1962
G	10	Sam Shepherd	39 – 21 April 1953
F	11	Carl Herrera	25 – 14 December 1966	2.06 m (6 ft 9 in)	Houston Rockets	(United States)
C	12	Omar Walcott	27 – 24 July 1965	2.04 m (6 ft 8 in)	Marinos de Anzoátegui	(Venezuela)
F	13	Gabriel Estaba	27 – 24 March 1965		Bravos de Portuguesa	(Venezuela)
F	14	Iván Olivares	30 – 10 December 1961		Trotamundos de Carabobo	(Venezuela)
F	15	Alexander Nelcha	24 – 21 January 1968		Maurienne Savoie	(France)

Head coach

- (Puerto Rico) Julio Toro

Legend

- Club – describes last
  club before the competition
- Age – describes age
  on 26 July 1992
