= Swimming at the 1991 Pan American Games – Men's 200 metre butterfly =

Men's 200 metre butterfly at the 1991 Pan American Games
- Venue: -
- Dates: August 17 (preliminaries and finals)
- Competitors: from - nations

Medalists
Gold medal	Mark Dean	United States
Silver medal	Anthony Nesty	Suriname
Bronze medal	Bart Pippenger	United States

The men's 200 metre butterfly competition of the swimming events at the 1991 Pan American Games took place on 17 August. The last Pan American Games champion was Bill Stapleton of US.

This race consisted of four lengths of the pool, all lengths being in butterfly stroke.

== Results ==
All times are in minutes and seconds.

KEY:	q	Fastest non-qualifiers	Q	Qualified	GR	Games record	NR	National record	PB	Personal best	SB	Seasonal best

=== Final ===
The final was held on August 17.

Rank	Name	Nationality	Time	Notes
1st place, gold medalist(s)	Mark Dean	United States	2:00.11	
2nd place, silver medalist(s)	Anthony Nesty	Suriname	2:01.76	
3rd place, bronze medalist(s)	Bart Pippenger	United States	2:02.00	
4	David Monasterio	Puerto Rico	2:03.13	
5	Diego Perdomo	Colombia	2:04.83	
6	Adriano Venturi	Chile	2:05.06	
7	Rene Santaella	Puerto Rico	2:05.09	
8	Erik Despradel	Dominican Republic	2:05.56	
