= Puerto Rico at the 1988 Summer Olympics =

- IOC code: PUR
- NOC: Puerto Rico Olympic Committee

in Seoul
- Competitors: 47 (44 men and 3 women) in 12 sports
- Flag bearer: Jesús Feliciano
- Medals: Gold 0 Silver 0 Bronze 0 Total 0

Summer Olympics appearances (overview)
- 1948; 1952; 1956; 1960; 1964; 1968; 1972; 1976; 1980; 1984; 1988; 1992; 1996; 2000; 2004; 2008; 2012; 2016; 2020; 2024; 2028

Puerto Rico competed at the 1988 Summer Olympics in Seoul, South Korea.

== Competitors ==
The following is the list of number of competitors in the Games.

Sport	Men	Women	Total
Archery	1	1	2
Athletics	4	1	5
Basketball	12	0	12
Boxing	10	–	10
Equestrian	1	0	1
Judo	4	–	4
Rowing	1	0	1
Sailing	3	0	3
Shooting	2	0	2
Swimming	2	1	3
Weightlifting	2	–	2
Wrestling	2	–	2
Total	44	3	47

== Results by event ==
=== Archery ===
In the fourth time this U.S. territory competed in archery at the Olympics, Puerto Rico entered one man and one woman.

Women's Individual Competition:

- Gloria Rosa — Preliminary Round (→ 54th place)

Men's Individual Competition:

- Miguel Pedraza — Preliminary Round (→ 67th place)

=== Athletics ===
Men's 200 metres

- Edgardo Guilbe

Men's 400 metres Hurdles

- Domingo Cordero

Men's Long Jump

- Raul Tejada

- Qualification — NM (→ did not advance)

Men's Triple Jump

- Ernesto Torres

Women's Long Jump

- Madeline de Jesús

=== Basketball ===
==== Men's tournament ====
Team roster

The following is the Puerto Rico roster in the men's basketball tournament of the 1988 Summer Olympics.

Puerto Rico men's national basketball team – 1988 Summer Olympics roster
Players
Coaches

Pos.	No.	Name	Age – Date of birth	Height	Club	Ctr.
C	4	José Ortiz	24 – 25 October 1963	2.11 m (6 ft 11 in)		(Greece)
PG	5	Federico López	26 – 26 March 1962	1.85 m (6 ft 1 in)
SG	6	Raymond Gause	28 – 4 February 1960	1.93 m (6 ft 4 in)
	7	Vicente Ithier	26 – 22 April 1962	1.91 m (6 ft 3 in)
F	8	Jerome Mincy	23 – 10 October 1964	2.00 m (6 ft 7 in)
	9	Roberto Ríos	31 – 14 August 1957	1.83 m (6 ft 0 in)
PG	10	Angelo Cruz	29 – 20 September 1958	1.75 m (5 ft 9 in)
F/C	11	Ramón Rivas	22 – 16 March 1966	2.08 m (6 ft 10 in)		(Greece)
F	12	Mario Morales	30 – 15 November 1957	1.96 m (6 ft 5 in)
	13	Edgar de León	23 – 2 November 1964	2.03 m (6 ft 8 in)
	14	Francisco de León	27 – 25 July 1961	2.08 m (6 ft 10 in)
F/C	15	Ramón Ramos	20 – 2 November 1967	2.03 m (6 ft 8 in)

Head coach

Aramandito Torres

Legend

- Club – describes last
  club before the tournament
- Age – describes age
  on 17 September 1988

Group play

Pos	Team	Pld	W	L	PF	PA	PD	Pts	Qualification
1	Yugoslavia	5	4	1	468	384	+84	9 (Note: Head-to-head record: Yugoslavia 1–0 Soviet Union)	Quarterfinals
2	Soviet Union	5	4	1	460	393	+67	9	Quarterfinals
3	Australia	5	3	2	429	408	+21	8 (Note: Head-to-head record: Australia 1–0 Puerto Rico)	Quarterfinals
4	Puerto Rico	5	3	2	382	387	−5	8	Quarterfinals
5	Central African Republic	5	1	4	346	436	−90	6	9th–12th classification round
6	South Korea (H)	5	0	5	384	461	−77	5	9th–12th classification round

Source: FIBA archive
Rules for classification: 1) points; 2) head-to-head points; 3) head-to-head goal average; 4) head-to-head number of points scored.
(H) Hosts
Notes:

18 September 1988

Australia	81–77	Puerto Rico
Scoring by half: 50–36, 31–41

Jamsil Gymnasium, Seoul

20 September 1988

South Korea	74–79	Puerto Rico
Scoring by half: 30–38, 44–41

Jamsil Gymnasium, Seoul

21 September 1988

Puerto Rico	81–93 (OT)	Soviet Union
Scoring by half: 39–37, 37–39 Overtime: 5–17

Jamsil Gymnasium, Seoul

23 September 1988

Central African Republic	67–71	Puerto Rico
Scoring by half: 41–27, 26–34

Jamsil Gymnasium, Seoul

24 September 1988

Puerto Rico	74–72	Yugoslavia
Scoring by half: 36–37, 38–35

Jamsil Gymnasium, Seoul

Quarterfinals

26 September 1988
11:45

Boxscore

United States	94–57	Puerto Rico
Scoring by half: 48–28, 46–29
Pts: Manning 18; Rebs: Manning 7 Asts: C.D. Smith 3		Pts: Cruz 12; Rebs: Mincy 8 Asts: Cruz 4

Jamsil Gymnasium, Seoul

Classification round 5–8

28 September 1988
9:45

Boxscore

Brazil	104–86	Puerto Rico
Scoring by half: 51–39, 53–47
Pts: Schmidt 46; Rebs: Schmidt 9 Asts: Guerrinha 7		Pts: E. de León 19; Rebs: E. de León 10; Asts: Cruz 2

Jamsil Gymnasium, Seoul

Classification round 7/8

29 September 1988
19:30

Boxscore

Puerto Rico	93–92	Spain
Scoring by half: 47–45, 46–47
Pts: Morales 25; Rebs: Ortíz, Mincy 8 Asts: Ortíz 4		Pts: Jiménez 31; Rebs: Jiménez 8 Asts: Solozábal 6

Jamsil Gymnasium, Seoul

=== Boxing ===
Men's Light Flyweight (– 48 kg)

- Luis Román Rolón

- First Round — Bye
- Second Round — Lost to Chatchai Sasakul (THA), 2:3

Men's Flyweight

- Andy Agosto

Men's Bantamweight

- Felipe Nieves

Men's Featherweight

- Esteban Flores

Men's Lightweight

- Héctor Arroyo

Men's Light-Welterweight

- Víctor Pérez

Men's Welterweight

- Lionel Ortíz

Men's Light-Middleweight

- Rey Rivera

Men's Light-Heavyweight

- Nelson Adams

Men's Super-Heavyweight

- Harold Arroyo

=== Judo ===
Men's Extra-Lightweight

- Luis Martínez

Men's Half-Lightweight

- Víctor Rivera

Men's Lightweight

- Angelo Ruiz

Men's Middleweight

- Jorge Bonnet

=== Swimming ===
Men's 50m Freestyle

- Manuel Guzmán

- Heat — 23.61 (→ did not advance, 24th place)

Men's 100m Freestyle

- Manuel Guzmán

- Heat — 51.25 (→ did not advance, 24th place)

Men's 200m Freestyle

- Salvador Vassallo

- Heat — 1:53.82 (→ did not advance, 36th place)

Men's 400m Freestyle

- Salvador Vassallo

- Heat — 3:55.30
- B-Final — 3:55.39 (→ 15th place)

Men's 100m Backstroke

- Manuel Guzmán

- Heat — 57.62 (→ did not advance, 24th place)
- B-Final — 57.95 (→ 15th place)

Men's 400m Individual Medley

- Salvador Vassallo

- Heat — 4:30.37 (→ did not advance, 20th place)

Women's 200m Freestyle

- Ritajean Garay

- Heat — 2:07.44 (→ did not advance, 33rd place)

Women's 400m Freestyle

- Ritajean Garay

- Heat — 4:24.84 (→ did not advance, 28th place)

Women's 800m Freestyle

- Ritajean Garay

- Heat — 9:04.62 (→ did not advance, 27th place)

Women's 100m Backstroke

- Ritajean Garay

- Heat — 1:08.58 (→ did not advance, 31st place)

Women's 200m Backstroke

- Ritajean Garay

- Heat — 2:23.73 (→ did not advance, 24th place)

== See also ==
- Puerto Rico at the 1987 Pan American Games
