= Swimming at the 1991 Pan American Games – Men's 100 metre breaststroke =

Men's 100 metre breaststroke at the 1991 Pan American Games
- Venue: -
- Dates: August 12 (preliminaries and finals)
- Competitors: from - nations

Medalists
Gold medal	Hans Dersch	United States
Silver medal	Todd Torres	Puerto Rico
Bronze medal	Jeff Commings	United States

The men's 100 metre breaststroke competition of the swimming events at the 1991 Pan American Games took place on 12 August. The last Pan American Games champion was Richard Korhammer of US.

This race consisted of two lengths of the pool, both lengths being in breaststroke.

== Results ==
All times are in minutes and seconds.

KEY:	q	Fastest non-qualifiers	Q	Qualified	GR	Games record	NR	National record	PB	Personal best	SB	Seasonal best

=== Final ===
The final was held on August 12.

Rank	Name	Nationality	Time	Notes
1st place, gold medalist(s)	Hans Dersch	United States	1:02.57	
2nd place, silver medalist(s)	Todd Torres	Puerto Rico	1:02.83	
3rd place, bronze medalist(s)	Jeff Commings	United States	1:03.02	
4	Pedro Hernández	Cuba	1:03.26	
5	Mario González	Cuba	1:03.56	
6	Robert Fox	Canada	1:03.86	
7	Jaime Mitropoulos	Brazil	1:05.04	
8	Gustavo Gorriaran	Uruguay	1:05.82	
