= 1993 FINA World Swimming Championships (25 m) – Men's 100 metre breaststroke =

These are the official results of the Men's 100 metres Breaststroke event at the 1993 FINA Short Course World Championships held in Palma de Mallorca, Spain.

== Finals ==
Pos	FINAL A	MARK
	Phil Rogers (AUS)	59.56
	Ron Dekker (NED)	59.95
	Seth Van Neerden (USA)	1:00.08
4.	Nick Gillingham (GBR)	1:00.29
5.	Eric Wunderlich (USA)	1:00.44
6.	Robert Abernethy (AUS)	1:00.68
7.	Chen Jianhong (CHN)	1:00.75
8.	Vitaly Kirinchuk (RUS)	1:00.95

Pos	FINAL B	MARK
1.	Vasily Ivanov (RUS)	1:00.90
2.	Sergio López (ESP)	1:01.06
3.	Fred Deburghgraeve (BEL)	1:01.15
4.	Jon Cleveland (CAN)	1:01.23
5.	Andrea Cecchi (ITA)	1:01.24
6.	Dariusz Jarzyna (POL)	1:01.42
7.	Petteri Lehtinen (FIN)	1:01.47
8.	Stéphane Vossart (FRA)	1:01.87

== Preliminary Round ==
Pos	HEAT 1	MARK
1.	Stéphane Vossart (FRA)	1:01.99
2.	Aleksandr Savitsky (KAZ)	1:02.48
3.	Cédric Pénicaud (FRA)	1:03.16
4.	Vadim Tatarov (MDA)	1:03.28
5.	Nikola Savčić (SCG)	1:03.66
6.	M. de Vasconcelos (BRA)	1:03.70
7.	Rubén Andrade (ECU)	1:07.84
DQ	Smain Ali-Benali (ALG)	-

Pos	HEAT 2	MARK
1.	Ron Dekker (NED)	1:00.31
2.	Seth Van Neerden (USA)	1:00.36
3.	Nick Gillingham (GBR)	1:00.54
4.	Dariusz Jarzyna (POL)	1:01.81
5.	Mario González (CUB)	1:02.07
6.	Marko Pachel (EST)	1:03.15
7.	José Merino (ECU)	-
8.	Todd Torres (PUR)	-

Pos	HEAT 3	MARK
1.	Eric Wunderlich (USA)	1:00.85
2.	Robert Abernethy (AUS)	1:01.20
3.	Jon Cleveland (CAN)	1:01.23
4.	Andrea Cecchi (ITA)	1:01.44
5.	Paul Kent (NZL)	1:02.31
6.	Gary O'Toole (IRL)	1:03.19
7.	Raiko Pachel (EST)	1:03.69
8.	Curtis Myden (CAN)	1:04.57

Pos	HEAT 4	MARK
1.	Phil Rogers (AUS)	1:00.48
2.	Chen Jianhong (CHN)	1:00.92
3.	Vitaly Kirinchuk (RUS)	1:01.16
4.	Sergio López (ESP)	1:01.21
5.	Vasily Ivanov (RUS)	1:01.55
6.	Petteri Lehtinen (FIN)	1:01.86
7.	Fred Deburghgraeve (BEL)	1:01.90
8.	Yevgeny Borodulin (KAZ)	1:02.40

RANK	HEATS RANKING	TIME
1.	Ron Dekker (NED)	1:00.31
2.	Seth Van Neerden (USA)	1:00.36
3.	Phil Rogers (AUS)	1:00.48
4.	Nick Gillingham (GBR)	1:00.54
5.	Eric Wunderlich (USA)	1:00.85
6.	Chen Jianhong (CHN)	1:00.92
7.	Vitaly Kirinchuk (RUS)	1:01.16
8.	Robert Abernethy (AUS)	1:01.20

== See also ==
- 1992 Men's Olympic Games 100m Breaststroke
- 1993 Men's European LC Championships 100m Breaststroke
