= Swimming at the 1995 Pan American Games – Men's 200 metre breaststroke =

Men's 200 metre breaststroke at the 1995 Pan American Games
- Venue: Complejo Natatorio
- Dates: between March 12–17 (preliminaries and finals)
- Competitors: from - nations

Medalists
Gold medal	Seth Van Neerden	United States
Silver medal	Eric Namesnik	United States
Bronze medal	Curtis Myden	Canada

The men's 200 metre breaststroke competition of the swimming events at the 1995 Pan American Games took place between March 12–17 at the Complejo Natatorio. The last Pan American Games champion was Mario González of Cuba.

This race consisted of four lengths of the pool, all in breaststroke.

== Results ==
All times are in minutes and seconds.

KEY:	q	Fastest non-qualifiers	Q	Qualified	GR	Games record	NR	National record	PB	Personal best	SB	Seasonal best

=== Final ===
The final was held between March 12–17.

Rank	Name	Nationality	Time	Notes
1st place, gold medalist(s)	Seth Van Neerden	United States	2:16.08	
2nd place, silver medalist(s)	Eric Namesnik	United States	2:17.70	
3rd place, bronze medalist(s)	Curtis Myden	Canada	2:19.00	
4	Todd Torres	Puerto Rico	2:20.57	
5	Jonathan Cleveland	Canada	2:21.74	
6	Jorge Montalvan	Peru	2:24.29	
7	Ricardo Arguelle	Panama	2:24.75	
8	Francisco Siu	El Salvador	2:25.62	
