= Swimming at the 1995 Pan American Games – Women's 100 metre butterfly =

Women's 100 metre butterfly at the 1995 Pan American Games
- Venue: Complejo Natatorio
- Dates: between March 12–17 (preliminaries and finals)
- Competitors: from - nations

Medalists
Gold medal	Amy Van Dyken	United States
Silver medal	Gabrielle Rose	Brazil
Bronze medal	Angie Wester-Krieg	United States

The women's 100 metre butterfly competition of the swimming events at the 1995 Pan American Games took place between March 12–17 at the Complejo Natatorio. The last Pan American Games champion was Kristin Topham of Canada.

This race consisted of two lengths of the pool, all in butterfly.

== Results ==
All times are in minutes and seconds.

KEY:	q	Fastest non-qualifiers	Q	Qualified	GR	Games record	NR	National record	PB	Personal best	SB	Seasonal best

=== Final ===
The final was held between March 12–17.

Rank	Name	Nationality	Time	Notes
1st place, gold medalist(s)	Amy Van Dyken	United States	1:00.71	
2nd place, silver medalist(s)	Gabrielle Rose	Brazil	1:01.67	
3rd place, bronze medalist(s)	Angie Wester-Krieg	United States	1:02.79	
4	Joanne Malar	Canada	1:03.10	
5	Niubis Reyes	Cuba	1:03.91	
6	María Pereyra	Argentina	1:04.13	
7	Gabriela Pignatta	Argentina	1:05.64	
8	Patrícia Comini	Brazil	1:06.04	
