= Swimming at the 1995 Pan American Games – Men's 100 metre breaststroke =

Men's 100 metre breaststroke at the 1995 Pan American Games
- Venue: Complejo Natatorio
- Dates: between March 12–17 (preliminaries and finals)
- Competitors: from - nations

Medalists
Gold medal	Seth Van Neerden	United States
Silver medal	Jonathan Cleveland	Canada
Bronze medal	Tyler Mayfield	United States

The men's 100 metre breaststroke competition of the swimming events at the 1995 Pan American Games took place between March 12–17 at the Complejo Natatorio. The last Pan American Games champion was Hans Dersch of US.

This race consisted of two lengths of the pool, both lengths being in breaststroke.

== Results ==
All times are in minutes and seconds.

KEY:	q	Fastest non-qualifiers	Q	Qualified	GR	Games record	NR	National record	PB	Personal best	SB	Seasonal best

=== Final ===
The final was held between March 12–17.

Rank	Name	Nationality	Time	Notes
1st place, gold medalist(s)	Seth Van Neerden	United States	1:02.48	
2nd place, silver medalist(s)	Jonathan Cleveland	Canada	1:03.01	
3rd place, bronze medalist(s)	Tyler Mayfield	United States	1:03.17	
4	Todd Torres	Puerto Rico	1:03.73	
5	Russell Patrick	Canada	1:04.59	
6	Jorge Montalvan	Peru	1:05.15	
7	José García	Mexico	1:05.81	
8	Francisco Siu	El Salvador	1:06.22	
