= Swimming at the 1995 Pan American Games – Men's 200 metre butterfly =

Men's 200 metre butterfly at the 1995 Pan American Games
- Venue: Complejo Natatorio
- Dates: between March 12–17 (preliminaries and finals)
- Competitors: from - nations

Medalists
Gold medal	Nelson Mora	Venezuela
Silver medal	Tom Malchow	United States
Bronze medal	André Teixeira	Brazil

The men's 200 metre butterfly competition of the swimming events at the 1995 Pan American Games took place between March 12–17 at the Complejo Natatorio. The last Pan American Games champion was Mark Dean of US.

This race consisted of four lengths of the pool, all lengths being in butterfly stroke.

== Results ==
All times are in minutes and seconds.

KEY:	q	Fastest non-qualifiers	Q	Qualified	GR	Games record	NR	National record	PB	Personal best	SB	Seasonal best

=== Final ===
The final was held between March 12–17.

Rank	Name	Nationality	Time	Notes
1st place, gold medalist(s)	Nelson Mora	Venezuela	2:00.38	
2nd place, silver medalist(s)	Tom Malchow	United States	2:00.49	
3rd place, bronze medalist(s)	André Teixeira	Brazil	2:01.95	
4	Edward Parenti	Canada	2:02.30	
5	Eduardo Piccinini	Brazil	2:03.09	
6	Joey Rossetti	United States	2:06.26	
7	Jorge Orozco	Mexico	2:07.41	
8	Diego Perdomo	Colombia	2:08.48	
