= Swimming at the 1993 Central American and Caribbean Games =

The Swimming competition at the 17th Central American and Caribbean Games was swum in November 1993 in Ponce, Puerto Rico. It featured events in a long course (50m) pool.

== Results ==
=== Men ===
Games	Gold		Silver		Bronze	
50 freestyle	Francisco Sánchez; Venezuela	23.40	Ricardo Busquets; Puerto Rico	23.54	Nelson Vargas; Mexico	24.12
100 freestyle	Francisco Sánchez; Venezuela	50.29	Ricardo Busquets; Puerto Rico	50.63	Oscar Sotelo; Mexico	52.94
200 freestyle	Pedro Carrío; Cuba	1:53.94	Alejandro Bermúdez; Colombia	1:54.18	Francisco Sánchez; Venezuela	1:54.67
400 freestyle	Jaime Lipszyc; Costa Rica	4:00.20	Alejandro Bermudez; Colombia	4:00.43	Pedro Carrío; Cuba	4:02.90
1500 freestyle	Jaime Lipszyc; Costa Rica	15:47.96	Simón Chocrón; Venezuela	15:49.77	Michel García; Cuba	16:02.36
100 backstroke	Rodolfo Falcón; Cuba	57.47	Ricardo Busquets; Puerto Rico	58.45	René Sáez; Cuba	58.76
200 backstroke	Rodolfo Falcón; Cuba	2:03.48	René Sáez; Cuba	2:05.94	Alejandro Bermúdez; Colombia	2:06.43
100 breaststroke	Mario González; Cuba	1:03.27; GR	Chris Flook; Bermuda	1:04.04; NR	Todd Torres; Puerto Rico	1:04.71
200 breaststroke	Mario González; Cuba	2:17.76; GR	Gabriel Vázquez; Mexico	2:21.21	Chris Flook; Bermuda	2:22.93; NR
100 butterfly	Diego Perdomo; Colombia	55.57	Francisco Sánchez; Venezuela	56.72	José Menéndez; Cuba	56.81
200 butterfly	Nelson Mora; Venezuela	2:02.64	Germán Rieckehoff; Puerto Rico	2:05.13	Jorge Anaya; Mexico	2:05.29
200 I.M.	Walter Sosa; Nicaragua	2:09.38	Mario González; Cuba	2:10.06	Carlos Bodega; Puerto Rico	2:10.19
400 I.M.	Alejandro Bermúdez; Colombia	4:32.35	Gabriel Vázquez; Mexico	4:40.73	Erick Greenwood; Costa Rica	4:41.35
4x100 free relay	Mexico; César Pérez; Nelson Vargas; José Castellanos; Oscar Sotelo	3:29.78	Venezuela; Raúl Arismendi; Diego Henao; José Pérez; Francisco Sánchez	3:30.84	Puerto Rico; Luis Díaz; Germán Rieckehoff; Pablo Espada; Ricardo Busquets	3:31.38
4x200 free relay	Cuba; Pedro Carrío; Michel García; Rodolfo Falcón; René Sáez	7:43.83	Venezuela; Raúl Arismendi; Rafael Manzano; José Pérez; Francisco Sánchez	7:44.39	Mexico; Oscar Sotelo; José Gutiérrez; Jorge Anaya; Rodolfo Bulnes	7:45.20
4x100 medley relay	Cuba; Rodolfo Falcón; Mario González; José Menéndez; Yohan Casas	3:50.90	Puerto Rico; Ricardo Busquets; Todd Torres; Jorge Vázquez; Luis Díaz	3:52.15	Mexico; Nelson Vargas; Gabriel Vázquez; Jorge Anaya; Oscar Sotelo	3:53.77

=== Women ===
Games	Gold		Silver		Bronze	
50 freestyle	Déborah Figueroa; Cuba	26.83	Siobhan Cropper; Trinidad and Tobago	26.93	Celiangel Coello; Venezuela	27.58
100 freestyle	Déborah Figueroa; Cuba	58.23	Siobhan Cropper; Trinidad and Tobago	58.78	Niuvys Rosales; Cuba	59.09
200 freestyle	Daimara Muñoz; Cuba	2:07.99	Daniela Villegas; Mexico	2:08.56	Dayana Vázquez; Venezuela	2:08.10
400 freestyle	Daniela Nayarena; Venezuela	4:24.73	María José Marenco; El Salvador	4:25.55	Dayana Vázquez; Venezuela	4:27.12
800 freestyle	Daniela Nayarena; Venezuela	9:02.69	María José Marenco; El Salvador	9:08.06	Dayana Vázquez; Venezuela	9:11.90
100 backstroke	Sangeeta Puri; Trinidad and Tobago	1:05.87	Ana María González; Cuba	1:06.60	Rosa Barbella; Venezuela	1:08.19
200 backstroke	Ana María González; Cuba	2:22.18	Sangeeta Puri; Trinidad and Tobago	2:24.25	Rosa Barbella; Venezuela	2:24.31
100 breaststroke	Mikeila Torres; Cuba	1:14.62	Kenia Puertas; Venezuela	1:15.06	Sandra Arroyo; Costa Rica	1:15.41
200 breaststroke	Sandra Arroyo; Costa Rica	2:39.38	Mikeila Torres; Cuba	2:42.65	Kenia Puertas; Venezuela	2:44.90
100 butterfly	Niuvys Rosales; Cuba	1:03.12	Ana Graham; Mexico	1:05.04	Odaysi Salgado; Cuba	1:05.06
200 butterfly	Niuvys Rosales; Cuba	2:21.36	Odaysi Salgado; Cuba	2:21.42	María José Marenco; El Salvador	2:22.97
200 I.M.	Claudia Fortín; Honduras	2:25.17	Sonia Álvarez; Puerto Rico	2:25.46	Daniela Villegas; Mexico	2:25.95
400 I.M.	Sonia Álvarez; Puerto Rico	5:04.58	Claudia Fortín; Honduras	5:08.62	Isabel Ceballos; Colombia	5:08.93
4x100 free relay	Cuba; Déborah Figueroa; Ivaniuska Dreke; Suset López; Niuvys Rosales	3:58.20	Mexico; Laura Pontones; Daniela Villegas; Agueda Chávez; Paola Meléndez	4:02.16	Puerto Rico; Gloria Lebrón; Sonia Álvarez; Vanessa Carrero; Rosalee Ramírez	4:04.74
4x200 free relay	Cuba; Déborah Figueroa; Daimara Muñoz; Odaysi Salgado; Niuvys Rosales	8:39.83	Mexico; Paola Meléndez; Daniela Villegas; Yessica Altamirano; Olivia Bautista	8:43.67	Venezuela; Rosa Barbella; Gloria Ramos; Daniela Nayarena; Dayana Vázquez	8:43.96
4x100 medley relay	Cuba; Ana María González; Mikeila Torres; Niuvys Rosales; Déborah Figueroa	4:23.90	Costa Rica; Marianela Marín; Sandra Arroy; Mariana Soto; Geisel Bonilla	4:30.61	Mexico; Heike Koerner; Natalia Costa; Ana Graham; Daniela Villegas	4:32.89
