= Swimming at the 1991 Pan American Games – Women's 100 metre butterfly =

Women's 100 metre butterfly at the 1991 Pan American Games
- Venue: -
- Dates: August 16 (preliminaries and finals)
- Competitors: from - nations

Medalists
Gold medal	Kristin Topham	Canada
Silver medal	Angie Wester-Krieg	United States
Bronze medal	Suzy Buckovich	United States

The women's 100 metre butterfly competition of the swimming events at the 1991 Pan American Games took place on 16 August. The last Pan American Games champion was Janel Jorgensen of US.

This race consisted of two lengths of the pool, all in butterfly.

== Results ==
All times are in minutes and seconds.

KEY:	q	Fastest non-qualifiers	Q	Qualified	GR	Games record	NR	National record	PB	Personal best	SB	Seasonal best

=== Final ===
The final was held on August 16.

Rank	Name	Nationality	Time	Notes
1st place, gold medalist(s)	Kristin Topham	Canada	1:01.19	
2nd place, silver medalist(s)	Angie Wester-Krieg	United States	1:01.55	
3rd place, bronze medalist(s)	Suzy Buckovich	United States	1:01.60	
4	Niuvis Rosales	Cuba	1:03.10	
5	Gabriela Gaja	Mexico	1:03.32	
6	Beth Hazel	Canada	1:03.64	
7	Celina Endo	Brazil	1:04.23	
8	Shelley Cramer	U.S. Virgin Islands	1:04.82	
