= Seth Van Neerden =

American swimmer (born 1968)

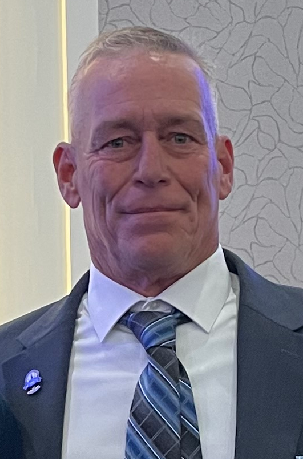
- Van Neerden in 2026

Personal information
- National team: United States
- Born: August 1968 (age 58)

Sport
- Sport: Swimming
- Strokes: Breaststroke
- Club: Fort Lauderdale Swim Team
- Coach: Jack Nelson
Medal record
Men's swimming
Representing the United States
World Championships (SC)
Bronze medal – third place	1993 Palma	100 m breaststroke
Pan Pacific Championships
Gold medal – first place	1993 Kobe	4×100 m medley
Bronze medal – third place	1993 Kobe	100 m breaststroke
Pan American Games
Gold medal – first place	1995 Mar del Plata	100 m breaststroke
Gold medal – first place	1995 Mar del Plata	200 m breaststroke
Gold medal – first place	1995 Mar del Plata	4×100 m medley

Seth Van Neerden (born August 1968) is an American former swimmer. Specializing in breaststroke events, he won multiple U.S. championships and held a national record in the 100 metres breaststroke. Van Neerden ranked among the top 20 in the event worldwide for seven years and won three gold medals at the 1995 Pan American Games. He was also a gold medalist at the 1993 Pan Pacific Swimming Championships and won a bronze medal at the 1993 FINA World Swimming Championships.

== Early life ==
Seth Van Neerden was born in August 1968, and is from Arden, Delaware. He started swimming at age seven, at a club in Arden, and later competed at the Wilmington Aquatic Club (WAC) under coach Bob Mattson. Growing up, he was a top swimmer in breaststroke events, once being ranked number one nationally in the 100-yard breaststroke in the U.S. in the 13–14 age bracket. He was also an AAU Junior Olympics champion in the event when competing in that age group. Van Neerden attended Mount Pleasant High School, and as a freshman in 1982 was a state champion and broke the state record in the 100-yard breaststroke, with a time of 1:00.10. Van Neerden did not compete at Mount Pleasant as a sophomore due to academic issues but returned for his junior season. As a junior, he won the state championship in his breaststroke event and placed second in the 200 individual medley. He also broke his state record in the 100 breaststroke with a time of 59.12, a time that also set the pool record at the University of Delaware. Van Neerden was a high school All-American for his junior season. He won another state title as a senior and finished his time at Mount Pleasant with an undefeated record of 62–0. Van Neerden's state breaststroke record remained unbeaten until 2002; it was Delaware's longest-lasting individual swimming record at that time.

While in high school, Van Neerden qualified for the 1984 United States Olympic trials, although he decided not to compete at them, in part due to academic issues and being "not in tip-top shape". Two years later, he won gold in the 100 breaststroke at the U.S. Olympic Festival, defeating Scott Jaffe in an upset. In 1986, after having finished his Mount Pleasant career, he served as an assistant coach at the school. He still attended classes at Mount Pleasant during the 1986–87 school year although he was ineligible to compete. He graduated from Mount Pleasant in 1987.

After high school, Van Neerden enrolled at Indian River Community College in Florida, but left shortly after. He said, "I didn't pack anything. I just walked out and hitchhiked home. I didn't bring a thing with me." Van Neerden worked various odd jobs, including in construction and landscaping, after coming back to Delaware, but also struggled with substance abuse. The Miami Herald described Van Neerden's life at the time of the 1988 Olympic trials as "going nowhere". He told the paper in 1992, "I didn't know whether I wanted to go up, down, left or right. I went up, down left and right ... Four years ago I was getting into trouble every night of the week, and that went on for quite awhile." However, a lifeguard job offered by his old coach, Bob Mattson, led to him becoming interested in swimming again, and he underwent rehabilitation, becoming drug-free. Reflecting on his past in the Montreal Gazette, Van Neerden said "Drugs and alcohol are the worst things you can do. They do nothing but ruin human lives. I feel very strongly about this."

== Return to swimming and international career ==
Van Neerden trained under Mattson in 1989 and 1990 at the WAC for five hours each day, while also serving as a youth coach. He competed in all 11 events at one tournament in December 1989 and helped the club to a Middle Atlantic championship. He placed second at the 1990 Senior National Swimming Championships in the 100-yard breaststroke and sixth at the U.S. Swimming Long Course World Games Selection Meet in the 100 metres breaststroke. Van Neerden later decided to move to Florida to continue his career. According to the Chicago Tribune, he "arrived in Fort Lauderdale at Christmas of 1990 with $60, three duffel bags and a reputation that made it hard for him to travel light." He said, "I didn't know anybody or anything. I just knew I wanted to swim." He joined the Fort Lauderdale Swim Team, coached by Jack Nelson, where he trained four hours a day, six days a week.

In 1991, Van Neerden won the 100 m breaststroke at the Senior National Championships with a time of 1:01.67, just slower than the world record of 1:01.45 and qualifying him for the 1991 Pan Pacific Swimming Championships. He was a selection to the 1991 U.S. Swimming All-America team and was ranked the number one competitor in his event in the country. Van Neerden finished fourth in his event at the 1991 Pan Pacific Championships and won a silver medal at the U.S. Open in December 1991. He qualified for the 1992 U.S. Olympic trials, but finished eighth and last in the finals of the 100 m breaststroke, in part due to a slow start after believing he false started, with a time of 1:03.53. Later that year, he won gold in the event at the U.S. Open with a time of 1:02.35.

Van Neerden finished second at the 1993 national championships with a time of 1:02.33 and thus qualified for the 1993 Pan Pacific Swimming Championships. At the Pan Pacific Championships, he finished fourth in the 200 m breaststroke with a time of 2:15.56, won bronze in the 100 m breaststroke with a time of 1:02.35, and was a member of a 4 × 100 m medley relay team that won gold with a time of 3:39.52. Later that year, he also participated at the 1993 FINA World Swimming Championships, winning bronze in the 100 m while being a member of a U.S. team that set a world record and won gold in the 4 × 100 medley relay with a time of 3:32.57.

At the 1994 U.S. national championships, Van Neerden won the 100 m breaststroke with a time of 1:01.40, tying the all-time American record. His time was also the second-fastest in world history at the time, and his American record remained until it was broken two years later. He also won the 200 m breaststroke title at the U.S. championships, beating Eric Wunderlich in a comeback win with a time of 2:13.27. Van Neerden qualified for the 1994 World Aquatics Championships in Rome, where he finished eighth in both the 100 m and 200 m. The following year, he qualified for the 1995 Pan American Games in three events. He won gold in all three: in the 100 m, with a time of 1:02.48; in the 200 m, with a time of 2:16.08; and as a member of the gold-medal-winning 4 × 100 medley relay team that posted a time of 3:41.24. For 1995, Van Neerden was named the Athlete of the Year by the Delaware Sportswriters and Broadcasters Association; he was only the third swimmer to ever win the award. In 1996, he won another national championship in the 100 m. However, at trials for the 1996 Summer Olympics, he placed sixth in the 100 m and tenth in the 200 m, thus failing to qualify again. Afterwards, he announced his retirement.

From 1990 to 1996, Van Neerden was among the top 20 breaststrokers in the 100 m every year. He also had the fourth-best 200 m time in the world in 1995.

During his career, Van Neerden was known for his flamboyant personality. The News Journal called him "the U.S. team's resident free spirit" and said that "Van Neerden yells at spectators, spits mists of pool water and bangs his starting blocks before races. It's his way of spicing up a sport he calls, at best, bland." He told The Miami Herald, "Swimming is one of the dullest sports in existence because it lacks radicals. A person sets a world record, people clap, he waves at them, and that's about it. But when I come out on the deck, you know I'm there."

== Later life ==
Van Neerden returned to swimming in masters competitions. In 1997, he was an All-American in the 25–29 age group in the 100 m breaststroke. He broke a masters national record in the 30–34 age group in 1998 and was an All-American in that group and later the 35–39 group. He later attended Broward College in Florida and Delaware Technical Community College. Van Neerden worked at The Mary Campbell Center, a care facility for the disabled. There, he met his wife Melissa Heck, whom he married in 2014. In 2026, Van Neerden was selected for induction to the Delaware Sports Museum and Hall of Fame.

== See also ==
- World record progression 4 × 100 metres medley relay
