= Swimming at the 1991 Pan American Games – Men's 4 × 100 metre medley relay =

Men's 4 × 100 metre medley relay at the 1991 Pan American Games
- Venue: -
- Dates: August 18 (preliminaries and finals)
- Competitors: from - nations

Medalists
Gold medal	Andrew Gill, Hans Dersch, Mike Merrell and Joel Thomas	United States
Silver medal	-, -, - and -	Puerto Rico
Bronze medal	-, -, - and -	Cuba

The men's 4 × 100 metre medley relay competition of the swimming events at the 1991 Pan American Games took place on 18 August. The last Pan American Games champion was the United States.

== Results ==
All times are in minutes and seconds.

KEY:	q	Fastest non-qualifiers	Q	Qualified	GR	Games record	NR	National record	PB	Personal best	SB	Seasonal best

=== Final ===
The final was held on August 18.

Rank	Name	Nationality	Time	Notes
1st place, gold medalist(s)	Andrew Gill; Hans Dersch; Mike Merrell; Joel Thomas	United States	3:42.84	
2nd place, silver medalist(s)	- - - -	Puerto Rico	3:45.78	
3rd place, bronze medalist(s)	- - - -	Cuba	3:45.96	
4	- - - -	Canada	3:48.37	
5	- - - -	Argentina	3:54.10	
6	- - - -	Mexico	3:54.34	
7	- - - -	Uruguay	3:55.95	
8	- - - -	Trinidad and Tobago	4:03.61	
