= 1992 United States Olympic trials (swimming) =

1992 United States Olympic Trials (swimming)
- Host city: Indianapolis, Indiana, U.S.
- Date: March 1 – March 7
- Venue: Indiana University Natatorium
- Events: 28 (men: 14; women: 14) The men's 800-meter and women's 1500-meter freestyle were contested, but the winners were not selected on the Olympic team as the events were not swam at the 1992 Olympics.

The 1992 United States Olympic trials for swimming events were held from March 1 to 7 in Indianapolis. It was the qualifying meet for American swimmers who hoped to compete at the 1992 Summer Olympics in Barcelona.

== Results ==
Key: Highlighted swimmers achieved the qualification conditions to be included in the Olympic team in that respective event.

=== Men's events ===
Event	Gold		Silver		Bronze	
50 m freestyle	Matt Biondi	22.12	Tom Jager	22.17	Steve Crocker	22.49
100 m freestyle	Matt Biondi	49.31	Jon Olsen	49.42	Joe Hudepohl	49.52
200 m freestyle	Joe Hudepohl	1:48.73	Doug Gjertsen	1:48.89	Melvin Stewart	1:49.05
400 m freestyle	Dan Jorgensen	3:49.14	Sean Killion	3:51.47	Lawrence Frostad	3:52.95
1500 m freestyle	Sean Killion	15:07.21	Lawrence Frostad	15:09.93	Carlton Bruner	15:11.24
100 m backstroke	Jeff Rouse	54.07	David Berkoff	54.65	Andy Gill	55.53
200 m backstroke	Royce Sharp	1:58.66	Tripp Schwenk	1:58.97	Jeff Rouse	1:59.37
100 m breaststroke	Nelson Diebel	1:01.40 NR	Hans Dersch	1:02.14	Eric Wunderlich	1:02.47
200 m breaststroke	Roque Santos	2:13.50	Mike Barrowman	2:13.54	Eric Wunderlich	2:15.87
100 m butterfly	Pablo Morales	54.05	Melvin Stewart	54.06	Seth Pepper	54.37
200 m butterfly	Melvin Stewart	1:55.72	Dave Wharton	1:59.66	Mike Merrell	1:59.68
200 m IM	Ron Karnaugh	2:01.56	Greg Burgess	2:01.71	Mike Barrowman	2:01.79
400 m IM	Eric Namesnik	4:15.60	Dave Wharton	4:17.58	Ray Looze	4:21.51

=== Women's events ===
Event	Gold		Silver		Bronze	
50 m freestyle	Jenny Thompson	25.20 NR	Angel Martino	25.46	Leigh Ann Fetter	25.55
100 m freestyle	Jenny Thompson	54.63	Nicole Haislett	55.15	Ashley Tappin	55.47
200 m freestyle	Nicole Haislett	1:58.65	Jenny Thompson	1:59.98	Whitney Hedgepeth	2:00.86
400 m freestyle	Janet Evans	4:09.47	Erika Hansen	4:11.30	Kim Small	4:12.11
800 m freestyle	Janet Evans	8:27.24	Erika Hansen	8:30.05	Kim Small	8:35.48
100 m backstroke	Janie Wagstaff	1:00.84 NR	Lea Loveless	1:01.17	Trina Thames	1:02.41
200 m backstroke	Janie Wagstaff	2:09.43	Lea Loveless	2:10.68	Whitney Hedgepeth	2:13.09
100 m breaststroke	Anita Nall	1:09.29	Megan Kleine	1:10.08	Kelli King-Bednar	1:10.20
200 m breaststroke	Anita Nall	2:25.35 WR	Jill Johnson	2:28.52	Kristine Quance	2:29.89
100 m butterfly	Crissy Ahmann-Leighton	58.61	Summer Sanders	59.67	Jenny Thompson	59.88
200 m butterfly	Summer Sanders	2:08.86	Angie Wester-Krieg	2:12.13	Julia Gorman	2:12.50
200 m IM	Summer Sanders	2:13.10	Nicole Haislett	2:14.49	Janel Jorgensen	2:16.85
400 m IM	Summer Sanders	4:40.79	Erika Hansen	4:41.06	Janet Evans	4:45.55

== See also ==
- United States at the 1992 Summer Olympics
- United States Olympic Trials (swimming)
- USA Swimming
