= Swimming at the 1995 Pan American Games – Men's 4 × 100 metre medley relay =

Men's 4 × 100 metre medley relay at the 1995 Pan American Games
- Venue: Complejo Natatorio
- Dates: between March 12–17 (preliminaries and finals)
- Competitors: from - nations

Medalists
Gold medal	Jeff Rouse, Seth Van Neerden, Mark Henderson and Jon Olsen	United States
Silver medal	Rogério Romero, Oscar Godói, Eduardo Piccinini and Gustavo Borges	Brazil
Bronze medal	Jonathan Cleveland, -, - and -	Canada

The men's 4 × 100 metre medley relay competition of the swimming events at the 1995 Pan American Games took place between March 12–17 at the Complejo Natatorio. The last Pan American Games champion was the United States.

== Results ==
All times are in minutes and seconds.

KEY:	q	Fastest non-qualifiers	Q	Qualified	GR	Games record	NR	National record	PB	Personal best	SB	Seasonal best

=== Final ===
The final was held between March 12–17.

Rank	Name	Nationality	Time	Notes
1st place, gold medalist(s)	Jeff Rouse; Seth Van Neerden; Mark Henderson; Jon Olsen	United States	3:41.24	
2nd place, silver medalist(s)	Rogério Romero; Oscar Godói; Eduardo Piccinini; Gustavo Borges	Brazil	3:43.93	
3rd place, bronze medalist(s)	Jonathan Cleveland - - -	Canada	3:45.10	
4	- - - -	Puerto Rico	3:49.55	
5	- - - -	Mexico	3:51.80	
6	- - - -	Argentina	3:53.95	
7	- - - -	Ecuador	3:59.95	
8	- - - -	Panama	4:06.88	
