= Swimming at the 1991 Pan American Games =

- Dates: August 12–18, 1991
- No. of events: 32

Swimming at the 11th Pan American Games was held August 12–18, 1991 in Havana, Cuba. The competition consisted of 32 events (26 individual and 6 relay); and were contested in the long course (50 m) pool.

Brazil's victory in the men's 4 × 100 m freestyle relay was only the second time that the U.S. lost the gold in a relay event, at the Pan American Games. The first had been to Canada in women's 4 × 100 m medley at the 1971 Pan American Games.

It was the first time that the U.S. lost the gold medal in the men's 100 meter freestyle, after 10 straight titles. This feat fitted Gustavo Borges, who went on to win four Olympic medals after this.

== Results ==
=== Men's events ===
Event	Gold		Silver		Bronze	
50 m freestyle	Todd Pace; United States	22.60	Adam Schmitt; United States	22.61	Gustavo Borges; Brazil	22.82
100 m freestyle	Gustavo Borges; Brazil	49.48; GR	Joel Thomas; United States	50.55	Rodrigo González; Mexico	51.25
200 m freestyle	Eric Diehl; United States	1:49.67; GR	Gustavo Borges; Brazil	1:49.74	René Sáez; Cuba	1:52.14
400 m freestyle	Sean Killion; United States	3:50.38; GR	Jorge Herrera; Cuba	3:54.91	Eric Diehl; United States	3:58.06
1500 m freestyle	Alex Kostich; United States	15:21.36	Jorge Herrera; Cuba	15:33.61	Pedro Carrío; Cuba	15:39.73
100 m backstroke	Andy Gill; United States	55.79	Rodolfo Falcón; Cuba	56.12	Bobby Brewer; United States	56.39
200 m backstroke	Rogério Romero; Brazil	2:01.07	Dan Veatch; United States	2:01.14	Manuel Guzmán; Cuba	2:01.68
100 m breaststroke	Hans Dersch; United States	1:02.57	Todd Torres; Cuba	1:02.83	Jeff Commings; United States	1:03.02
200 m breaststroke	Mario González; Cuba	2:15.50; GR	Nelson Diebel; United States	2:16.08	Tyler Mayfield; United States	2:17.49
100 m butterfly	Anthony Nesty; Suriname	53.45; GR	Mike Merrell; United States	54.60	Eduardo Piccinini; Brazil	55.00
200 m butterfly	Mark Dean; United States	2:00.11	Anthony Nesty; Suriname	2:01.76	Bart Pippenger; United States	2:02.00
200 m I.M.	Ron Karnaugh; United States	2:00.92; GR	Manuel Guzmán; Cuba	2:03.99	Ray Looze; United States	2:04.29
400 m I.M.	Alex Kostich; United States	4:23.96	Jody Braden; United States	4:26.25	Jasen Pratt; Canada	4:26.31
4 × 100 m Free Relay	Brazil; Teófilo Ferreira; Emmanuel Nascimento; Júlio César Rebolal; Gustavo Borges	3:23.26	Canada; Reggie Lacoursiere; Ronald Page; Stephen Clarke; Stephen Vandermeulen	3:25.39	Puerto Rico; David Monasterio; Jorge Herrera; Manuel Guzmán; Ricardo Busquets	3:27.17
4 × 200 m Free Relay	(United States) USA; John Keppeler; Jim Wells; Clay Tippins; Eric Diehl	7:23.39	Brazil; Teófilo Ferreira; Emmanuel Nascimento; Cassiano Leal; Gustavo Borges	7:28.83	Puerto Rico; David Monasterio; Jorge Herrera; Manuel Guzmán; Ricardo Busquets	7:29.96
4 × 100 m Medley Relay	(United States) USA; Andrew Gill; Hans Dersch; Mike Merrell; Joel Thomas	3:42.84	Puerto Rico; David Monasterio; Jorge Herrera; Todd Torres; Ricardo Busquets	3:45.78	Cuba; Rodolfo Falcón; Mario González; José Ulises Hernández; René Sáez	3:45.96

=== Women's events ===
Event	Gold		Silver		Bronze	
50 m freestyle	Kristin Topham; Canada	26.01; GR	Heather Hageman; United States	26.26	Allison Bock; United States	26.45
100 m freestyle	Ashley Tappin; United States	56.51	Megan Oesting; United States	57.14	Kristin Topham; Canada	57.63
200 m freestyle	Lisa Jacob; United States	2:02.06	Barbara Metz; United States	2:02.92	Kim Paton; Canada	2:04.73
400 m freestyle	Jane Skillman; United States	4:13.69	Barbara Metz; United States	4:16.90	Tara-Lynn Seymour; Canada	4:22.15
800 m freestyle	Jane Skillman; United States	8:43.26	Lisa Jacob; United States	8:51.36	Tara-Lynn Seymour; Canada	8:52.33
100 m backstroke	Sylvia Poll; Costa Rica	1:03.15	Nikki Dryden; Canada	1:03.64	Jodi Wilson; United States	1:03.78
200 m backstroke	Diana Trimble; United States	2:15.80	Nikki Dryden; Canada	2:16.13	Joanne Malar; Canada	2:16.36
100 m breaststroke	Dorsey Tierney; United States	1:10.30; GR	Lydia Morrow; United States	1:11.00	Lisa Flood; Canada	1:11.75
200 m breaststroke	Dorsey Tierney; United States	2:28.69; GR	Chantal Dubois; Canada	2:33.62	Lisa Flood; Canada	2:34.08
100 m butterfly	Kristin Topham; Canada	1:01.19	Angie Wester-Krieg; United States	1:01.55	Suzy Buckovich; United States	1:01.60
200 m butterfly	Susan Gottlieb; United States	2:12.35	Angie Wester-Krieg; United States	2:14.55	Beth Hazel; Canada	2:14.91
200 m I.M.	Lisa Summers; United States	2:16.86	Joanne Malar; Canada	2:19.14	Jennifer Toton; United States	2:19.56
400 m I.M.	Amy Shaw; United States	4:50.39	Joanne Malar; Canada	4:51.27	Brandy Wood; United States	4:52.38
4 × 100 m Freestyle Relay	(United States) USA; Megan Oesting; Suzy Buckovich; Lisa Jacob; Ashley Tappin	3:48.88	Canada; Sharon Turner; Kristin Topham; Joanne Malar; Kimberly Paton	3:52.29	Brazil; Isabelle Vieira; Paula Marsiglia; Paula Renata Aguiar; Paoletti Filippini	3:52.92
4 × 200 m Freestyle Relay	(United States) USA; Natalie Norberg; Barbara Metz; Jane Skillman; Lisa Jacob	8:11.47; GR	Canada; Kimberly Paton; Joanne Malar; Nikki Dryden; Tara-Lynn Seymour	8:21.62	Mexico; Lorenza Muñoz; Susana Goldschmied; Gabriela Gajá; Laura Sánchez	8:29.17
4 × 100 m Medley Relay	(United States) USA; Jodi Wilson; Dorsey Tierney; Angie Wester-Krieg; Ashley Tappin	4:12.51; GR	Brazil; Ana Azevedo; Glicia Lofego; Paoletti Filippini; Celina Endo	4:23.45	Mexico; Heike Koerner; Monique Piñon; Gabriela Gaja; Laura Sánchez	4:25.94

== Medal table ==
Rank	Nation	Gold	Silver	Bronze	Total
1	United States	24	14	11	49
2	Brazil	3	3	3	9
3	Canada	2	8	9	19
4	Cuba	1	1	3	5
5	Suriname	1	1	0	2
6	Costa Rica	1	0	0	1
7	Puerto Rico	0	5	3	8
8	Mexico	0	0	3	3
Totals (8 entries)		32	32	32	96
