= René Sáez =

Cuban swimmer (born 1971)

Personal information
- Born: June 27, 1971 (age 55) Havana, Cuba

Sport
- Sport: Swimming
Medal record
Representing Cuba
Pan American Games
Bronze medal – third place	1991 Havana	200m freestyle
Bronze medal – third place	1991 Havana	4x100m medley relay
Central American and Caribbean Games
Gold medal – first place	1993 Ponce	4x200m freestyle relay
Silver medal – second place	1993 Ponce	200m backstroke
Bronze medal – third place	1993 Ponce	100m backstroke

René Sáez (born June 27, 1971) is a former international swimmer from Cuba, who participated in two consecutive Panamerican Games for his native country, starting in 1987.

His best result was a third place in the Men's 200m freestyle at the 1991 Panamerican Games, Havana, Cuba. At the 1993 Central American and Caribbean Games, he won medals in the 100m and 200m backstroke and 4 x 200m freestyle relay. He also participated in the Swimming at the 1991 Pan American Games – Men's 200 metre freestyle and Swimming at the 1991 Pan American Games.
