= Alejandro Bermúdez =

Colombian swimmer

Personal information
- Full name: Alejandro Bermúdez Tamayo
- Nationality: Colombia
- Born: March 30, 1975 (age 51) Colombia
- Height: 1.90 m (6 ft 3 in)
- Weight: 75 kg (165 lb)

Sport
- Sport: Swimming
- Strokes: Medley
Medal record
Men's swimming
Representing Colombia
Central American and Caribbean Games
Gold medal – first place	1993 Ponce	400 m medley
Silver medal – second place	1993 Ponce	200 m freestyle
Silver medal – second place	1993 Ponce	400 m freestyle
Silver medal – second place	1998 Maracaibo	400 m freestyle
Silver medal – second place	1998 Maracaibo	400 m medley
Bronze medal – third place	1993 Ponce	200 m backstroke
Bronze medal – third place	1998 Maracaibo	200 m medley

Alejandro Bermúdez Tamayo (born March 30, 1975) is a retired backstroke and medley swimmer from Colombia. He competed in three consecutive Summer Olympics for his native country, starting in 1992. His best result was 13th place in the Men's 400 metres Individual Medley at the 1996 Summer Olympics in Atlanta, Georgia.

At the 1992 Summer Olympics in Barcelona, Bermúdez finished 25th in the 1500-meter freestyle, 26th in the 200-meter backstroke, 27th in the 400-meter individual medley, and 35th in the 400-meter freestyle. At the 1995 Pan American Games in Mar del Plata, he finished 4th in the 400-meter freestyle, 4th in the 400-meter individual medley, and 8th in the 200-meter freestyle. At the 1996 Summer Olympics in Atlanta, Bermúdez finished 13th in the 400-meter individual medley, and 21st in the 400-meter freestyle. At the 2000 Summer Olympics in Sydney, Bermúdez finished 28th in the 200-meter backstroke, and 35th in the 400-meter individual medley.
