= Swimming at the 1991 Pan American Games – Men's 200 metre breaststroke =

Men's 200 metre breaststroke at the 1991 Pan American Games
- Venue: -
- Dates: August 16 (preliminaries and finals)
- Competitors: from - nations

Medalists
Gold medal	Mario González	Cuba
Silver medal	Nelson Diebel	United States
Bronze medal	Tyler Mayfield	United States

The men's 200 metre breaststroke competition of the swimming events at the 1991 Pan American Games took place on 16 August. The last Pan American Games champion was Jeff Kubiak of US.

This race consisted of four lengths of the pool, all in breaststroke.

== Results ==
All times are in minutes and seconds.

KEY:	q	Fastest non-qualifiers	Q	Qualified	GR	Games record	NR	National record	PB	Personal best	SB	Seasonal best

=== Final ===
The final was held on August 16.

Rank	Name	Nationality	Time	Notes
1st place, gold medalist(s)	Mario González	Cuba	2:15.50	GR
2nd place, silver medalist(s)	Nelson Diebel	United States	2:16.08	
3rd place, bronze medalist(s)	Tyler Mayfield	United States	2:17.49	
4	Pablo Minelli	Argentina	2:17.96	
5	Robert Fox	Canada	2:19.01	
6	Gustavo Gorriaran	Uruguay	2:20.38	
7	Andrew Tussler	Canada	2:20.55	
8	Jaime Mitropoulos	Brazil	2:22.36	
