= Beth Hazel =

Canadian swimmer

Personal information
- Full name: Elizabeth Merryn Hazel
- National team: Canada
- Born: January 15, 1974 (age 52) Thornton Heath, London, England
- Height: 1.72 m (5 ft 8 in)
- Weight: 59 kg (130 lb)

Sport
- Sport: Swimming
- Strokes: Backstroke, butterfly
- Club: London Aquatic Club (Ontario)
- College team: University of Florida
Medal record
Women's swimming
Representing Canada
Pan American Games
Bronze medal – third place	1991 Havana	200 m butterfly

Elizabeth Merryn Hazel (born January 15, 1974) is an English-born former competition swimmer who represented Canada in international events.

In her international debut as a 17-year-old at the 1991 Pan American Games in Havana, Hazel won a bronze medal for her third-place finish in the women's 200-metre butterfly, finishing behind Americans Susan Gottlieb and Angie Wester-Krieg. A year later at the 1992 Summer Olympics in Barcelona, Spain, she swam in the preliminary heats of the women's 200-metre backstroke, clocking a time of 2:17.70 and finishing 25th overall among 43 contenders.

Hazel attended the University of Florida, where she swam for the Florida Gators swimming and diving team in National Collegiate Athletic Association (NCAA) and Southeastern Conference (SEC) competition from 1992 to 1995. During her college swimming career, she received nine All-American honors, and won SEC championships in the 400-yard medley relay in 1993, and the 200-yard backstroke in 1995. She graduated from the University of Florida with a bachelor's degree in zoology in 1995.

After the Olympic Games, Hazel went on to marry Don Field. In 2002, their twins, Erin and Sean Field, were born. Hazel now works as a rheumatologist at the Montreal General hospital. She is also the residency program director for Rheumatology at McGill University. Dr. Hazel still swims in her spare time.

== See also ==
- List of University of Florida alumni
- List of University of Florida Olympians
