= Chris Flook =

Bermudian swimmer (born 1973)

Personal information
- Full name: Christopher Thomas Flook
- Nationality: Bermuda
- Born: February 1, 1973 (age 53)

Sport
- Sport: Swimming
- Strokes: Breaststroke
- College team: Shippensburg University (USA)
Medal record
Central American and Caribbean Games
Silver medal – second place	1993 Ponce	100 breast
Bronze medal – third place	1993 Ponce	200 breast

Chris Flook (born February 1, 1973) is an Olympic and national record holding swimmer from Bermuda. He swam for Bermuda at the 1992 Olympics.

At the 1993 Central American & Caribbean Games, he set the Bermuda Records in the 100 and 200 Breaststrokes (1:04.04 and 2:22.93).

He swam for Bermuda at the:

- 1994 Commonwealth Games
- 1993 Central American & Caribbean Games
- 1992 Olympics
- 1991 Pan American Games
