= Sangeeta Puri =

Indian swimmer

Personal information
- Born: December 4, 1979 (age 46)

Sport
- Sport: Swimming
Medal record
Representing Trinidad and Tobago
Central American and Caribbean Games
Gold medal – first place	1993 Ponce	100m backstroke
Silver medal – second place	1993 Ponce	200m backstroke

Sangeeta Puri (born 4 December 1979) is a former swimmer who competed for India in the Olympic Games and Trinidad and Tobago at the Pan American Games. She was the first female swimmer to represent India in the Olympics, breaking the glass ceiling for future female swimmers in India to compete at that level. Puri was world ranked (top 25 in the world) in the 100m Backstroke with a time of 1:04.68, which was a national record for Trinidad and Tobago for over 23 years. She held long-standing national records in multiple events in both India as well as Trinidad and Tobago. She competed in international games, including Pan American Games, Commonwealth Games, Asian Games, World Games, and the Olympic Games.

== Career ==
Puri represented Trinidad and Tobago in the 1993 Central American and Caribbean Games and won a gold medal in the 100m backstroke and a silver medal in the 200m backstroke.

She competed in the 1994 Commonwealth Games in the 50m freestyle, 100m backstroke and 100m butterfly.

Puri represented India at the 1996 Summer Olympic Games in the 50m freestyle and finished 48th with a time of 28.02.

She attended Palisades Charter High School and set records in the 100-yard butterfly and 100-yard backstroke at the City Section swimming finals. Puri then swam for Princeton, and helped her tiger team win multiple Ivy League titles and break Princeton records.

After retiring from swimming and graduating from Princeton University, Puri went on to work for the International Rescue Committee in Tanzania as a Princeton in Africa fellow. She then returned to the United States and pursued her Juris Doctor at the University of San Francisco School of Law. Once she graduated from Law School, she worked for the United Nations in Guatemala.

Puri now enjoys a quiet life with her family. She continues to love swimming.
