= Jaime Lipszyc =

Costa Rican freestyle swimmer (born 1971)

Personal information
- Born: August 22, 1971 (age 54) San Jose, Costa Rica
- Height: 5 ft 11 in (180 cm)

Sport
- Sport: Swimming
- Strokes: Freestyle
Medal record
Representing Costa Rica
Central American and Caribbean Games
| Gold medal – first place | 1993 Ponce | 400m freestyle |
| Gold medal – first place | 1993 Ponce | 1500m freestyle |

Jaime Lipszyc (born August 22, 1971) is a Costa Rica freestyle swimmer. He holds national records in the 400m and 1500m swimming races. He participated in the 1986 Madrid World Championships. He went to school at the University of Tennessee where he was an All American.
