= Swimming at the 1987 Pan American Games – Men's 200 metre backstroke =

Men's 200 metre backstroke at the 1987 Pan American Games
- Venue: Indiana University Natatorium
- Dates: August 11 (preliminaries and finals)
- Competitors: from - nations

Medalists
Gold medal	Mike O'Brien	United States
Silver medal	Ricardo Prado	Brazil
Bronze medal	Ray Brown	Canada

The men's 200 metre backstroke competition of the swimming events at the 1987 Pan American Games took place on 11 August at the Indiana University Natatorium. The last Pan American Games champion was Rick Carey of US.

This race consisted of four lengths of the pool, all in backstroke.

== Results ==
All times are in minutes and seconds.

KEY:	q	Fastest non-qualifiers	Q	Qualified	GR	Games record	NR	National record	PB	Personal best	SB	Seasonal best

=== Final ===
The final was held on August 11.

Rank	Name	Nationality	Time	Notes
1st place, gold medalist(s)	Mike O'Brien	United States	2:02.29	
2nd place, silver medalist(s)	Ricardo Prado	Brazil	2:03.75	
3rd place, bronze medalist(s)	Ray Brown	Canada	2:04.28	
4	Gary Vandermeulen	Canada	2:05.29	
5	Jerry Frentsos	United States	2:05.42	
6	Alejandro Alvizuri	Peru	2:05.63	
7	Ernesto Vela	Mexico	2:06.45	
8	Rene Saez	Cuba	2:09.66	
