= Arnd Neuhaus =

German basketball player (born 1967)

Personal information
- Nationality: German
- Born: 26 September 1967 (age 57); Hagen, West Germany

Sport
- Sport: Basketball

Arnd Neuhaus (born 26 September 1967) is a German basketball player. He competed in the men's tournament at the 1992 Summer Olympics.
