= Vladimir Gorin =

Russian basketball player (born 1961)

Personal information
- Nationality: Russian
- Born: 13 March 1961 (age 64); Cherepovets, Soviet Union

Sport
- Sport: Basketball

Vladimir Gorin (born 13 March 1961) is a Russian former basketball player. He competed in the men's tournament at the 1992 Summer Olympics.
