= Vitaly Kirinchuk =

Russian swimmer

Personal information
- Born: 2 September 1970 (age 55) Saint Petersburg, Russia

Sport
- Sport: Swimming
Medal record
Representing Russia
European Championships
Gold medal – first place	1993 Sheffield	4×100 m medley
Bronze medal – third place	1993 Sheffield	100 m breaststroke

Vitaly Yurievich Kirinchuk (Russian: Виталий Юрьевич Киринчук; born 2 September 1970) is a retired Russian swimmer who won a gold medal in the 4×100 m medley relay and a bronze medal in the 100 m breaststroke events at the 1993 European Aquatics Championships.

He graduated from the Lesgaft National State University of Physical Education, and after retirement from competitions worked as a coach in swimming, volleyball and basketball at the Saint-Petersburg University of Humanities and Social Sciences.
