= Swimming at the 1987 Pan American Games – Men's 200 metre butterfly =

Men's 200 metre butterfly at the 1987 Pan American Games
- Venue: Indiana University Natatorium
- Dates: August 14 (preliminaries and finals)
- Competitors: from - nations

Medalists
Gold medal	Bill Stapleton	United States
Silver medal	Jayme Taylor	United States
Bronze medal	Anthony Nesty	Suriname

The Men's 200 metre butterfly competition of the swimming events at the 1987 Pan American Games took place on 14 August at the Indiana University Natatorium. The last Pan American Games champion was Craig Beardsley of US.

This race consisted of four lengths of the pool, all lengths being in butterfly stroke.

== Results ==
All times are in minutes and seconds.

KEY:	q	Fastest non-qualifiers	Q	Qualified	GR	Games record	NR	National record	PB	Personal best	SB	Seasonal best

=== Final ===
The final was held on August 14.

Rank	Name	Nationality	Time	Notes
1st place, gold medalist(s)	Bill Stapleton	United States	2:00.70	
2nd place, silver medalist(s)	Jayme Taylor	United States	2:00.73	
3rd place, bronze medalist(s)	Anthony Nesty	Suriname	2:01.09	
4	Peter Ward	Canada	2:02.52	
5	Mike Meldrum	Canada	2:02.98	
6	Ricardo Jimenez	Venezuela	2:03.42	
7	Hans Palacios	Ecuador	2:06.67	
8	Luis Correa	Nicaragua	2:08.52	
