= Elşad Qadaşev =

Russian basketball player

Personal information
- Nationality: Soviet
- Born: 1 May 1968 (age 57); Baku, Azerbaijan SSR, Soviet Union

Sport
- Sport: Basketball

Elşad Qadaşev (born 1 May 1968) is an Azerbaijani-Russian former basketball player. He competed in the men's tournament at the 1992 Summer Olympics.
