= Jack Nelson (swimmer) =

American swimmer and coach

Personal information
- Full name: Jack Weyman Nelson
- National team: United States
- Born: November 8, 1931 Chickamauga, Georgia
- Died: November 5, 2014 (aged 82) Fort Lauderdale, Florida
- Height: 5 ft 4 in (1.63 m)
- Weight: 161 lb (73 kg)

Sport
- Sport: Swimming
- Strokes: Butterfly
- Club: North Carolina Athletic Club
- College team: University of Miami

Jack Weyman Nelson (November 8, 1931 – November 5, 2014) was an All-American competition swimmer for the University of Miami who competed in the 1956 Melbourne Olympics in butterfly and served as a Hall of Fame swimming coach at Fort Lauderdale's Pine Crest School, the Jack Nelson Swim Club, and the University of Miami. He allegedly sexually abused many of his athletes. He managed teams that won 6 National Championship titles, and 30 High School State Championships.

Remaining a Southerner nearly all his life, Nelson was born on November 8, 1931 in Chickamauga, Georgia.

== University of Miami swimming ==
Nelson began his swimming career at Indiana's Lafayette high school, currently known as Lafayette Jefferson, though he subsequently took a break in his swimming career to serve in the United States Air Force. He was a member of the University of Miami Hurricanes aquatic teams from 1958-1959 and was untouchable in butterfly competition in southern area meets during his period of competition. He excelled equally in freestyle relay events, swimming a school record in the 100-yard sprint. Nelson won at nearly every distance in University of Miami dual meets, going undefeated for over two years. He made his most notable mark for Miami in the 1958 NCAA championships, placing third in the 200-yard butterfly. In 1958, he was chosen as an All-American. He graduated from the University of Miami in 1960.

== 1956 Olympics ==
Nelson represented the United States at the 1956 Summer Olympics in Melbourne, Australia, and competed in the men's 200-meter butterfly, finishing fourth in the event final.

== Coaching ==
In 1962 he began coaching Pine Crest School's swim team, and also coached his own Jack Nelson Swim Club which he founded as the Fort Lauderdale Swim Club in Fort Lauderdale, Florida. He led his Jack Nelson Swim Club, to an exceptional six US National Championship titles. In Florida High School coaching, he managed teams that won 30 High School State championships.

Outstanding swimmers he coached included 1972 Munich Olympian, 1974 4 x 100 meter freestyle relay world record holder and Pine Crest graduate Ann Marshall, and 1968 Canadian Olympic medalist Marilyn Corson. He also coached David Edgar an NCAA championship freestyle sprinter from the U. of Tennessee and 1972 Olympic gold medalist. Other Olympic medalists he coached included 1960 Olympic gold medalist Shirley Stobbs, and 1992 Olympic gold medalist Joel Thomas. He led several swimmers to record world record times, including Laurie Lehner, Ann Marshall and Andy Coan. One of his outstanding swimmers, Seth Van Neerden, broke the American record in the 100 breaststroke in 1994. In all, he coached five swimmers who would advance to capture Olympic medals. He also served as a head coach for the U.S. Olympic women's swim team at the 1976 Summer Olympics in Montreal, Quebec.

After coaching in Fort Lauderdale, Nelson served as head swim coach for the University of Miami from 1986-90.

== Honors ==
Nelson was inducted into the University of Miami Sports Hall of Fame in 1975. In a more exclusive recognition, he was subsequently inducted into the International Swimming Hall of Fame as an "Honor Coach" in 1994, and the American Swimming Coaches Association Hall of Fame in 2009. In 1993 Nelson was selected as Man of the Year for the City of Fort Lauderdale’s Man of the Year.

== Sexual abuse allegations ==
In the 1990s, Nelson was accused by Diana Nyad, a former pupil, and her teammates, of rape and sexual harassment though Nyad had spoken of the incidents as early as the 1980s. Nyad and her teammates first reported sexual assault incidents to the headmaster of Pine Crest School, William McMillan, in 1971–1972; McMillan subsequently terminated Nelson's contract. Nyad more recently said publicly that Nelson molested her beginning when she was 14 years old, around 1963, until she graduated from high school at Pine Crest School, as he did with other girls he coached. The incidents of sexual assault are depicted in the 2023 film Nyad with Eric T. Miller as Nelson.

== Personal life ==
Nelson died on November 5, 2014, of complications from Alzheimer's disease; he was 82.

== See also ==
- List of members of the International Swimming Hall of Fame
- List of University of Miami alumni
