= Mike Merrell =

American swimmer (born 1973)

Personal information
- Full name: Michael Wayne Merrell
- Nickname: "Mike"
- National team: United States
- Born: June 25, 1973 (age 53) Charlotte, North Carolina, U.S.
- Height: 5 ft 9 in (1.75 m)
- Weight: 155 lb (70 kg)

Sport
- Sport: Swimming
- Strokes: Butterfly
- Club: Trojan Swim Club; Mecklenburg Aquatic Club
- College team: University of Southern California
Medal record
Men's swimming
Representing the United States
US Olympic Festival
Gold medal – first place	1990 Minneapolis	100 m butterfly
Gold medal – first place	1990 Minneapolis	200 m butterfly
Pan American Games
Gold medal – first place	1991 Havana, Cuba	400 medley relay
Silver medal – second place	1991 Havana, Cuba	100 m butterfly
Summer Universiade
Silver medal – second place	1995 Fukuoka	200 m butterfly

Michael Wayne Merrell (born June 25, 1973) is an American competition swimmer, one of the world's top butterfliers and a 7-time All-American.

Mike swam at USC under both coach Peter Daland and Mark Schubert. He holds University of Southern California Top Ten Times in both the 100 fly (47.93) and 200 fly (1:44.78), and held the school record in the 200m butterfly for over 20 years until 2016.

In 1994-95, Merrell represented the United States at the Summer Universiade Games in Fukuoka, where he won a silver medal in the 200 fly. He also competed in the 1996 US Olympic Trials where he placed 8th in the 200 fly.

In 1993-94, Merrell represented the United States at the Pan Pacific Games in Kobe, Japan, where he was the consolation winner in both fly events. At the 1994 NCAA Championships, he placed fourth in the 200 fly (1:45.20) and 11th in the 100 fly (48.32). He also help the team to an eighth-place finish in 800 free relay.

In 1992-92, Merrell earned All-America honors for the second straight year after finishing sixth in the 100 fly (47.93) and third in the 200 fly (1:44.93) at the 1993 NCAAs, the highest finish for any USC Trojan at the meet. He was the 1992 U.S. national champion in the 100 meter fly in August 1992 (54.08). He place third (missing a berth on the Olympic team by 2-hundredths of a second) at the 1992 U.S. Olympic Trials in the 200-meter fly.

In 1991-92, Merrell earned All-America honors by finishing third in the 200-yard fly at the 1992 NCAA Championships (1:45:22). Also at the NCAAs, he swam legs on USC's 200 and 400 medley relays. Merrell was the fastest collegian at the 1992 Olympic Trials in the 200-meter fly, setting a USC record of 1:59:86, good for third place. Ironically, his winning time of 54:08 in the 100 fly at the 1992 Summer Nationals would have earned him a spot on the 1992 Olympic Team. He also placed third in the 200-meter fly at U.S. Nationals. His first international experience was a success: In 1992, Merrell won a gold and silver medal in the 400 medley relay and 100 meter fly (54.06), respectively, as the PanAm Games in Havana, Cuba.

In high school, Merrell was selected to the 1991 USA Junior National Team that competed in Canada and traveled with the 1990 U.S. Junior National Team to France and Germany. He was a 2-event gold medalist at the 1990 [Olympic Festival], including setting a Festival record in the 100-meter fly (54.97) and was the meet's high points scorer. Merrell was one of the top high school butterfliers throughout his career at South Mecklenburg High, winning North Carolina state titles in the 100 fly in 1990 and 1991 and being named North Carolina Swimmer of the Year. He also earned high school All-America honors in 1989, 1990 and 1991. In the age group rankings, he was the nation's top 17-18 year old in the 100 fly in 1990 and was world-ranked in both the 100-meter fly and 200-meter fly (2:01.44) in 1990.

Personal records:

- 100-yard fly: .......48.11
- 100-meter fly: ......53.74
- 200-yard fly: .....1:44.93
- 200-meter fly: ... 1:59.45
- 200-yard IM: ......1:49.39
- 400-yard IM: ......4:06.10

Merrell currently lives in Marin County, California, with his wife Erika and their three sons: Chase, Cooper, and Brody. He is Head Coach for the Lucas Valley Lightning Swim Team in San Rafael, CA which is part of the Marin Swim League.
