= Ana María González (swimmer) =

Cuban swimmer (born 1976)

Personal information
- Nationality: Cuba
- Born: July 9, 1976 (age 49)

Sport
- Sport: Swimming
- Strokes: Backstroke

Ana María González (born July 9, 1976) is a retired female Olympic backstroke swimmer from Cuba. She swam for Cuba at the:

- 2000 Olympics
- 1999 Pan American Games
- 1998 Central American & Caribbean Games
- 1993 Central American & Caribbean Games
