= Joel Thomas (swimmer) =

American swimmer (born 1966)

Personal information
- Full name: Joel Ladd Thomas
- National team: United States
- Born: December 13, 1966 (age 59) Pasadena, California, U.S.
- Height: 6 ft 4 in (1.93 m)
- Weight: 229 lb (104 kg)

Sport
- Sport: Swimming
- Strokes: Freestyle
- Club: Fort Lauderdale Swim Club
- College team: University of California, Berkeley
- Coach: Nort Thornton (U. Cal. Berkeley); Jack Nelson (Fort Lauderdale Swim Club)
Medal record
Men's swimming
Representing United States
Olympic Games
Gold medal – first place	1992 Barcelona	4x100 m freestyle
Pan American Games
Gold medal – first place	1991 Havana	4x100 m medley
Silver medal – second place	1991 Havana	100 m freestyle
Universiade
Gold medal – first place	1987 Zagreb	4x100 m freestyle

Joel Ladd Thomas (born December 13, 1966) is an American former competition swimmer and Water Polo player for the University of California at Berkeley and a 1992 Olympic gold medalist in the 4x100-meter freestyle relay.

Thomas attended John Muir High School. He was honored with a selection as a second team All-League Water Polo player while competing for John Muir in January 1983. In the Pacific League finals in May 1984, swimming for John Muir, Thomas set a league record in the 100-yard freestyle of 47.47. He would lower his times and remain an accomplished sprinter throughout his swimming career.

== U. Cal Berkeley ==
Thomas attended and swam for U Cal Berkeley, where he also played water polo as he had at John Muir High School. He helped the team win 1987 and 1988 NCAA Water Polo titles. Swimming for Cal Berkeley, Thomas won the 100 freestyle competition at the Pacific 10 Conference Championships in the Spring of both 1988, and in March 1989, where he swam a 43.68 in Long Beach, California, leading Berkeley to a third-place finish behind powerful Stanford, and second place UCLA.

Thomas tried out for the U.S. Olympic team at the 1988 Olympic Trials in Austin, Texas. Swimming in the 100-meter freestyle, he set a time of 50.69 in the preliminaries, finishing in 12th place and did not make the finals, as the top finishers were swimming under 50 seconds. He also tried out for the 50-meter freestyle event, but swam a 23.74, placing 44th.

Thomas swam for the U.S. National team between 1987-1992. His singularly most impressive achievement in swimming is likely his win in the US Open on December 2, 1990 against Matt Biondi in the 100-meter freestyle, where he set a time of 50.46. Thomas was training with Coach Jack Nelson's Fort Lauderdale Swim Club in Fort Lauderdale at the time. In December, 1990, while swimming the 200-yard freestyle event, Thomas also set a new 100-yard freestyle record of 43.77 at the Hall of Fame Trophy Meet in Fort Lauderdale, breaking the 15-year old record of Andy Coan set in 1975. In 1990, Thomas led the U.S. National Team in a meet against University of Tennessee in Knoxville winning the 100-yard freestyle in 50.89, though it was not his fastest time that year, anchoring the winning 400-meter medley relay team, and leading off the winning 400-meter freestyle relay team. In 1992, Thomas again swam in the U.S. Open placing third in the 100-yard freestyle with a time of 51.59.

== Pan Am Games, Universiade ==
At the 1991 Pan American Games in Havana, Cuba, Thomas won a gold medal as a member of the winning U.S. team in the 4×100-meter medley relay. Individually, he also received a silver medal for finishing second in the 100-meter freestyle event. In the 1987 Universiade in Zagreb, he won a gold medal swimming on the 4x100-meter freestyle relay team.

== 1992 Olympics ==
Thomas represented the United States at the 1992 Summer Olympics in Barcelona, Spain. He received a gold medal for swimming for the first-place U.S. team in the preliminary heats of the men's 4×100-meter freestyle relay. The combined time for the U.S. 4 x 100-meter freestyle relay team in the preliminary round 1, heat 1, in which Thomas swam was 3:18.50, with a Final time, in which Thomas did not swim of 3:16.74, taking the gold and finishing ahead of the Combined Team of five former Soviet Republics, including Russia, which finished 1.2 seconds behind the American team.

== See also ==
- List of Olympic medalists in swimming (men)
- List of University of California, Berkeley alumni
