= Javier Antonio Colón =

Puerto Rican basketball player

Personal information
- Born: June 4, 1969 (age 57) Ponce, Puerto Rico
- Listed height: 6 ft 0 in (1.83 m)
- Listed weight: 180 lb (82 kg)

Career information
- Playing career: 1987–2008
- Position: Point guard

Career history
- 1987–2008: Leones de Ponce

Career highlights
- 5× BSN champion (1990, 1992, 1993, 2002, 2004); BSN Most Valuable Player (1998)
Medals
Men's basketball
Representing Puerto Rico
FIBA Americas Championship
Gold medal – first place	1995 Argentina	Team competition
Silver medal – second place	1993 Puerto Rico	Team competition
Silver medal – second place	1997 Uruguay	Team competition
Pan American Games
Gold medal – first place	1991 Havana	Team competition
Centrobasket
Gold medal – first place	1991 Mexico	Team competition
Gold medal – first place	1993 Puerto Rico	Team competition
Silver medal – second place	1997 Honduras	Team competition
Bronze medal – third place	1995 Dominican Republic	Team competition
Central American and Caribbean Games
Gold medal – first place	1993 Puerto Rico	Team competition
Silver medal – second place	1990 Mexico	Team competition
Goodwill Games
Gold medal – first place	1994 St. Petersburg	Team competition

Javier Antonio "Toñito" Colón (born June 4, 1969) is a retired Puerto Rican basketball player. Colón spent his entire career as a point guard for the Leones de Ponce of the BSN from 1987 to 2008. Colón led the team to five championships during his career, and is currently third on assists of all-time in the league. Colón also played for the Puerto Rico National Basketball Team from 1990 to 1999.

== Career ==
Colón was born in Ponce, Puerto Rico on June 4, 1969. He debuted with the Leones de Ponce in 1987 when he was 17 years old.

Colón became a starter for the team in 1989 and became its captain until 2004. In 1990, he led the Leones to its first championship in 24 years. The team would win again in 1992 and 1993, as Colón led a sharpshooting team known for its accuracy. Colón, along with teammates Bobby Ríos, José "Papote" Agosto, and Charlie Lanauze were referred to as the "Four Horsemen of the Apocalypse" by the media. Colón averaged 18.2 points per game in 1993, the highest of his career.

Colón and the Leones would reach the Finals again in 1995, 1996, 1998, and 2003. In 2004, they beat the Vaqueros de Bayamón for their fifth championship in 15 years. Colón dedicated the championship to the Mayor of Ponce Rafael Cordero Santiago, an avid fan of the team, who had died early that year.

Colón was selected as one of the league's best players of the 1990s, along with Eddie Casiano, James Carter, Edgar de León and José "Piculín" Ortiz.

In his last years as a player, Colón settled on a role of back-up point guard. He retired in 2008.

=== Statistics ===
Legend
GP	Games played	GS	Games started	MPG	Minutes per game
FG%	Field goal percentage	3P%	3-point field goal percentage	FT%	Free throw percentage
RPG	Rebounds per game	APG	Assists per game	SPG	Steals per game
BPG	Blocks per game	PPG	Points per game	**Bold**	Career high

†	Denotes seasons in which Colón won a BSN championship

Year	Team	GP	FG%	3P%	FT%	RPG	APG	PPG
1987	Ponce	19	.517	.500	.808	0.8	1.0	4.6
1988	Ponce	30	.522	.320	.767	1.0	1.7	6.1
1989	Ponce	30	**.584**	.426	.773	2.8	5.9	12.6
1990	Ponce	24	.485	.314	.688	3.3	**9.0**	11.9
1991	Ponce	30	.517	**.528**	.743	4.3	6.3	14.0
1992	Ponce	21	.458	.407	**.906**	4.4	7.1	15.7
1993	Ponce	**34**	.525	.489	.896	4.5	5.3	**18.2**
1994	Ponce	26	.481	.371	.809	4.0	6.2	14.8
1995	Ponce	16	.462	.333	.772	3.7	7.2	16.8
1996	Ponce	33	.488	.343	.808	4.8	6.8	15.3
1997	Ponce	28	.488	.410	.904	**5.2**	6.8	16.9
1998	Ponce	30	.552	.434	.836	5.0	7.1	15.8
2000	Ponce	18	.472	.364	.829	3.0	4.2	10.8
2001	Ponce	25	.421	.406	.864	4.0	5.5	13.6
2002	Ponce	28	.466	.429	.792	4.1	5.1	15.3
2003	Ponce	29	.440	.368	.838	4.5	4.4	14.3
2004	Ponce	29	.462	.483	.736	3.6	4.8	11.2
2005	Ponce	32	.399	.414	.727	3.6	3.4	10.2
2006	Ponce	25	.356	.362	.721	2.5	2.9	9.0
2007	Ponce	28	.395	.328	.744	1.2	1.4	5.2
2008	Ponce	20	.298	.333	.750	0.5	0.8	2.6
Career		555	.475	.405	.819	3.5	5.0	12.3

== Olympic career ==
Colón was a member of Puerto Rico's National Basketball team for 9 years (1990–1999). As a member, he participated at the 1992 and 1996 Summer Olympics where the team finished 8th and 10th respectively. He also participated in several FIBA tournaments, winning a gold medal in 1995 and two silver medals in 1993 and 1997. Colón and the Puerto Rico team also won the gold at the 1991 Pan American Games and the 1994 Goodwill Games. Other tournaments and events were Colón participated with the Puerto Rico team were Centrobasket (winning two gold medals) and the Central American and Caribbean Games (winning one gold medal).

Colón quit the international team in 1999 after an injury had him sidelined the whole year.
