= Diego Perdomo =

Colombian swimmer

Personal information
- Born: April 4, 1972 (age 54)

Sport
- Sport: Swimming
Medal record
Representing Colombia
Central American and Caribbean Games
Gold medal – first place	1993 Ponce	100m butterfly

Diego Perdomo (born 4 April 1972) is a Colombian former swimmer who competed in the 1996 Summer Olympics.
