= Jorge Herrera (swimmer) =

Puerto Rican swimmer (born 1972)

Personal information
- Born: April 9, 1972 (age 54)
Medal record
Men's swimming
Representing Puerto Rico
Pan American Games
Silver medal – second place	1991 Havana	400m Freestyle
Silver medal – second place	1991 Havana	1500m Freestyle
Silver medal – second place	1991 Havana	4x100m Medley
Bronze medal – third place	1991 Havana	4x100m Freestyle
Bronze medal – third place	1991 Havana	4x200m Freestyle

Jorge A. Herrera Soto (born September 4, 1972) is a former international freestyle swimmer from Puerto Rico. He started swimming at the age of seven in Round Hill Swimming Team.

Among other competitions, Herrera participated in the 1990 Central American and Caribbean Games in Mexico, the 1991 6th World Swimming Championships in Australia, the 1991 Pan American Games in Cuba, the Pan Pacific Swimming Championships in Edmonton, Canada, and the 1992 Summer Olympics.

His best World Ranking result was a 10th place @ the 6th World Championships in Perth in the Men's 400m Freestyle (3:54.01). Herrera is best known for winning two silver medals and one bronze at the 1991 Pan American Games in Havana, Cuba, and five medals (two gold, two silver and a bronze) in the 1990 Centroamerican Games in Mexico. He currently holds national records in the 400 and 1,500 km freestyle since 1991.

== Life after swimming ==
He studied medicine and became a doctor in the Dominican Republic. He does not practice medicine, but works in a related field as general manager of a surgical implant company.

== Competitions ==
Herrera participated in:

1983 CCCAN in Dominican Republic, 1984 CISC in Trinidad and Tobago, 1985 CCCAN in Mexico, 1986 CISC in Curaçao, 1987 CCCAN in Salinas, Puerto Rico, 1988 CAC in Mexico and CISC in Dominican Republic, 1989 CCCAN in Venezuela. 1990 CAC in México 1991 6th World Swimming Championship 1991 Pan American Games in Cuba 1991 Pan Pacific Games, Edmonton Canadá 1992 Olympic Games, in Barcelona
