= Raymond Gause =

Puerto Rican basketball player

Personal information
- Born: February 4, 1961 Memphis, Tennessee
- Listed height: 6 ft 4 in (1.93 m)
- Listed weight: 194 lb (88 kg)

Career information
- College: UAB
- Position: Shooting guard
Medals
Representing Puerto Rico
Men's basketball
Pan American Games
Gold medal – first place	Havana 1991	Team competition
Tournament of the Americas.
Gold medal – first place	Mexico City 1989	Team competition
Silver medal – second place	Montevideo 1988	Team competition
CentroBasket Championships
Gold medal – first place	Havana 1989	Team competition
Gold medal – first place	Monterrey 1991	Team competition

Raymond Gause is a Puerto Rican former basketball player. He was born in Memphis, Tennessee and played his college basketball with the UAB Blazers under Gene Bartow. At Alabama-Birmingham he played with Jerome Mincy and Orlando "Pipo" Marrero. In 1984 he moved to Puerto Rico and established residency on the island. In 1987 he played his first season in the Superior League, BSN, with the Bayamon Cowboys. The following year, 1988, under Robert Corn, he helped Bayamon win their last championship of the 80's. That same year he was recruited by the Puerto Rican National Basketball Team as a three-point shooter and specialist, and became the starting shooting guard for the next four years. He immediately helped qualify Puerto Rico to the 1988 Summer Olympics in Seoul, Korea, at the 1988 Tournament of the Americas Olympic Qualifier in Montevideo, Uruguay.

In 1989 he played in the World Tournament Qualifier, 1989 Tournament of the Americas, in Mexico City and helped the team win a gold medal there. He also led Puerto Rico to a gold medal victory over Panama at the 1989 Centro Basket Tournament in Havana, Cuba. The following year, 1990, he helped Puerto Rico earn a Fourth Place at the 1990 FIBA World Championship in Buenos Aires, Argentina. After disposing of World Powers Yugoslavia, USA, and Australia, the team arrived undefeated at 7-0 to the semi-finals, only to lose its last two games in the medal round to the Soviet Union and Team USA.

In 1991, he led Puerto Rico to gold medals at the Centro Basket Tournament in Monterrey, Mexico, and the 1991 Pan American Games in Havana, Cuba, where he led the team by scoring 25 points with 7 three point baskets in the gold medal game victory against Mexico. That is the only gold medal Puerto Rico Basketball has ever won in Pan American Games.

In 1992, he played in the first international event NBA players were allowed to compete in at the 1992 Tournament of the Americas in Portland, Oregon and helped Puerto Rico qualify for the 1992 Summer Olympics in Barcelona, Spain. The 1992 Olympics marked his last participation in International Competition.

During his 4-year International career, the 6'4" Gause was known as an above average shooter, knocking down three-point shots at a 42% average. With his ability to shoot threes in clutch situations, his arrival on the National Team brought about the team's best four-year run of its history between 1988 and 1992.
