= Kristin Topham =

Canadian swimmer

Personal information
- Full name: Kristin Louise Topham
- National team: Canada
- Born: May 4, 1973 (age 53) Edmonton, Alberta, Canada
- Height: 1.85 m (6 ft 1 in)
- Weight: 65 kg (143 lb)

Sport
- Sport: Swimming
- Strokes: Butterfly, freestyle
- Club: Etobicoke Swim Club
Medal record
Women's swimming
Representing Canada
Pan American Games
Gold medal – first place	1991 Havana	50 m freestyle
Gold medal – first place	1991 Havana	100 m butterfly
Silver medal – second place	1991 Havana	4x100 m freestyle
Bronze medal – third place	1991 Havana	100 m freestyle

Kristin Louise Topham (born April 5, 1973) is a Canadian former competitive swimmer who represented Canada in international championship competitions in the late 1980s and early 1990s.

Topham is best remembered for her four-medal performance at the 1991 Pan American Games in Havana, Cuba. In individual sprint event, she won two gold medals in the 50-metre freestyle and the 100-metre butterfly, as well as a bronze in the 100-metre freestyle. As a member of Canada's second-place women's team in the 4x100-metre freestyle relay, she also earned a silver medal.

Topham also represented Canada twice in the Olympic Games. At her international debut as a 15-year-old at the 1988 Summer Olympics in Seoul, South Korea, she competed in two events, advancing to the B Final of the 50-metre freestyle and placing twelfth overall, as well as swimming for the Canadian team in the preliminary heats of the 4x100-metre freestyle relay.

When she won two golds at the 1991 Pan American Games, the Toronto Star listed her a Mississaugan.

Four years later at the 1992 Summer Olympics in Barcelona, Spain, she qualified for three events. Topham was a member of the sixth-place Canadian women's team in the 4x100-metre medley relay. In individual competition, she advanced to the B Finals of the 50-metre freestyle and the 100-metre butterfly, placing tenth and fourteenth, respectively.
