= Richard Santiago =

Puerto Rican boxer (born 1970)

Personal information
- Full name: Richard Santiago Rodríguez
- Nationality: Puerto Rico
- Born: September 28, 1970 (age 55)

Sport
- Sport: Boxing
- Weight class: Middleweight
Medal record
Pan American Games
Bronze medal – third place	1991 Havana	Middleweight

Richard Santiago Rodríguez (born September 28, 1970) is a retired male boxer from Puerto Rico, who won the bronze medal in the men's middleweight (– 75 kg) category at the 1991 Pan American Games in Havana, Cuba. He represented his native country at the 1992 Summer Olympics in Barcelona, Spain, falling in the first round to Germany's Sven Ottke.
