= Victor Colon =

Puerto Rican artistic gymnast (born 1972)

- Full name: Víctor Colon Ortíz
- Nickname: Peke papito
- Born: March 16, 1972 (age 54)
- Height: 173 cm (5 ft 8 in)

Gymnastics career
- Discipline: Men's artistic gymnastics
- Country represented: Puerto Rico
- Retired: 1995
Medal record
World Championships
Bronze medal – third place	1992 Paris	Vault
Pan American Games
Silver medal – second place	1995 Mar del Plata	Horizontal Bar
Bronze medal – third place	1991 Havana	Vault

Victor Colon Ortíz (born March 16, 1972) is a retired Puerto Rican artistic gymnast, who was the first Puerto Rican gymnast to obtain a medal in this sport in a world competition. He won a bronze medal with a score of 9.581 for the vault event in the 1992 World Artistic Gymnastics Championships. He was also the first Puerto Rican gymnast to complete in an Olympic Games, at the 1992 Summer Olympics in Barcelona.

Colon won medals at the 1991 Pan American Games and the 1995 Pan American Games.
