= Rita Garay =

Puerto Rican swimmer (born 1971)

Personal information
- Born: 30 June 1971 (age 55) San Juan de Puerto Rico

Sport
- Sport: Swimming

Rita Garay (born 30 June 1971) is a Puerto Rican swimmer. She competed at the 1988 Summer Olympics and the 1992 Summer Olympics.
