= Mark Dean (swimmer) =

American swimmer (born 1967)

Personal information
- Full name: Mark John Dean
- National team: United States
- Born: October 13, 1967 (age 58) Rockford, Illinois, U.S.
- Occupation: Attorney
- Height: 6 ft 0 in (1.83 m)
- Weight: 164 lb (74 kg)
- Spouse: Mary Helen Flanagan (1996)

Sport
- Sport: Swimming
- Strokes: Butterfly
- Club: Sugar Creek Sports (St. Louis); Kansas City Blazers
- College team: U of Cal, Los Angeles
- Coach: Jim Tynan (Sugar Creek); Pete Malone (KC Blazers); Ron Ballatore (UCLA)
Medal record
Men's swimming
Representing the United States
Pan American Games
Gold medal – first place	1991 Havana	200 m butterfly

Mark John Dean (born October 13, 1967) is an American former competition swimmer who competed for the University of California Los Angeles (UCLA), participated in the 200-meter butterfly at the 1988 Seoul Olympics, and was a Pan American Games gold medalist. After graduating UCLA in 1991, and the St. Louis University School of Law in 1996, he practiced law in St. Louis, Missouri.

Mark Dean was born October 13, 1967, in Rockford, Illinois to Roland and Margaret Dean. He began swimming at the age of 6 and after a family move he attended St. Louis, Missouri's Parkway North High School, where he swam for the Sugar Creek Sports Club and then Kansas's Shawnee Mission North High School where the family lived in Overland, Kansas, and Mark graduated in 1986. Though he preferred competing in basketball, by the age of 15, Dean was rated third nationally in his age group category in the 200 butterfly, and he began to realize his own potential in the sport.

== 1984 Olympic trials ==
He was one of the nation's youngest swimmers to qualify for the 1984 Olympic trials at the Indiana University Nadatorium in Indianapolis, where at 16, he swam the 1500-meter freestyle event. At the time he swam with the Sugar Creek Sports Club in St. Louis, Missouri, under Coach Jim Tynan where he started around 1980. The Sugar Creek Club had talented swimmers, and sent three of their members to the Olympic Trials in Indianapolis. Sugar Creek closed in May 1984, and Dean soon made the move to the Kansas City Blazers Sports Club. In 1984, he attended St. Louis's Parkway North High School.

By 1984, Mark emerged on the international stage under the tutelage of Shawnee Mission, Kansas's Kansas City Blazers swim team Hall of Fame Head coach, Pete Donovan Malone, averaging three hours of training a day. Like many outstanding coaches, Malone was a stern trainer, and had to adjust to Dean's more laid-back personality. Malone, who would serve as an Assistant Coach to the U.S. National Team in 1986, had competed for UCLA as a collegian, where he was coached by Ron Ballatore, Dean's own future coach.

== Early competition highlights ==
In December 1985, Dean spent a week training at Northern Arizona University's nadatorium where he engaged in medical testing and intense high altitude training along with 50 of the nation's top swimming prospects for the 1988 Olympics.

At the U.S. Swimming Senior Nationals in August, 1985, he placed fifth in the 200-meter butterfly with a 2:02.1, and 20th in the 800 freestyle with a 8:16.0 and 22nd in the 400 IM with a time of 4:32.6. At the National Seniors Meet, Dean placed sixth in the 200 Individual Medley, fifth in the 400 Individual Medley, and ninth in his signature event, the 200 butterfly.

Dean qualified for the 1986 World Championship Trials in Orlando, Florida, having swum a 4:33.59 in the 400 Individual Medley, and a 2:02.00 in the 200 Butterfly. At the June 1986 World Championship Trials, Dean performed well regionally, but his performance was not outstanding on the national stage, and he did not qualify for the World Championships. He went 11th in the 400 IM with a time of 4:32.07, 13th in the 200 butterfly with a Missouri Valley record time of 2:01.94, and set another Missouri Valley record in the 400 freestyle where he swam a 4:17.99, though ironically, with exceptional competition, he did not place in the event. His times would improve under the rigorous competition and training provided at UCLA.

== University of California ==
Enrolling at University of California, Los Angeles (UCLA) in September 1986, as the fastest 200 butterfly swimmer on the team, Dean graduated in 1991, after competing for Hall of Fame Coach Ron Ballatore's UCLA Bruins swimming and diving team. In November of his Freshman year, he first earned recognition on the All-American team for his performance in the 200 butterfly and 400 Individual Medley.

Around his Sophomore year while swimming with Ballatore at UCLA, Dean returned to his home in Kansas to train with Coach Malone and focus on a possible Olympic berth. Awakening at 5:00 am, and training as much as 5-6 hours a day, he qualified at the 1988 Olympic trials in Austin in the 200-meter butterfly with a time of 1:59.56, beating out Pablo Morales, to secure his place on the 1988 U.S. Olympic team.

== 1988 Seoul Olympics ==
At 20, Dean represented the United States at the late September, 1988 Summer Olympics in Seoul, South Korea, where he competed in the B Final of the men's 200-meter butterfly event, and finished with the ninth-best time overall of 2:00.26, an exceptional swim, but somewhat below his prior hopes. The American team did not have their best overall performance that year. Following the olympics, he met adversity, recovering from a collapsed lung in 1989 and a more severe collapsed lung in 1990 that required surgery.

On August 17, 1991, at the age of 23, Dean won the gold medal in the men's 200-meter butterfly event at the August, 1991 Pan American Games in Havana, Cuba, outperforming his Olympic time, with a personal best 2:00.11 in the finals.

=== Post-swimming careers ===
After ending his swimming career, he attended Saint Louis University School of Law beginning around 1992, where he served as the school's NCAA Compliance Officer. After graduating law school in 1995, Dean practiced law in St. Louis, where in 1996, he served as an Assistant Attorney General in Jefferson City, Missouri.

Dean married Mary Helen Flanagan on October 12, 1996 at the College Church at St. Louis University. Flanagan was a 1991 graduate of the University of Illinois in Champaign, and like Dean, a 1995 graduate of the St. Louis University School of Law, where the couple met. After law school, she initially served as a Public Defender in Jefferson City. Mark Dean has recently lived in Chesterfield, Missouri with his wife Mary, with whom he had a son and daughter.

== See also ==
- List of University of California, Los Angeles people
