= Edwin Pellot =

Puerto Rican basketball player

Personal information
- Nationality: Puerto Rican
- Born: 13 June 1963 (age 61)

Sport
- Sport: Basketball

Edwin Pellot (born 13 June 1963) is a Puerto Rican basketball player. He competed in the men's tournament at the 1992 Summer Olympics. He is best known for his tenure as a player with the BSN's Gallitos de Isabela team.
