= Luis Martínez (judoka) =

Puerto Rican judoka (born 1965)

Personal information
- Born: December 15, 1965 (age 60) Río Piedras, Puerto Rico
Medal record
Men's Judo
Representing Puerto Rico
Pan American Games
Gold medal – first place	1991 Havana	Flyweight

Luis Felipe Martínez Rosado (born December 15, 1965) is a retired male judoka from Puerto Rico.

Martínez claimed the gold medal in the Men's Flyweight (– 56 kg) division at the 1991 Pan American Games in Havana, Cuba. In the final he defeated USA's Clifton Sunada. He twice (1988 and 1992) represented his native country at the Summer Olympics.
