= Richard Soto =

Puerto Rican basketball player

Personal information
- Nationality: Puerto Rican
- Born: 11 April 1968 (age 56); New York, New York, United States

Sport
- Sport: Basketball

Richard Soto (born 11 April 1968) is a Puerto Rican basketball player. He competed in the men's tournament and played against top teams such as the USA and Australia in 1992 Summer Olympics and the 1996 Summer Olympics.
