= David Monasterio =

Puerto Rican swimmer (born 1971)

Personal information
- Born: January 13, 1971 (age 55)
Medal record
Men's swimming
Representing Puerto Rico
Pan American Games
Silver medal – second place	1991 Havana	4x100m Medley
Bronze medal – third place	1991 Havana	4x100m Freestyle
Bronze medal – third place	1991 Havana	4x200m Freestyle

David V. Monasterio Ruiz (born January 13, 1971) is a former international freestyle and butterfly swimmer from Puerto Rico, who participated at the 1992 Summer Olympics for his native country. He won three relay medals (one silver, two bronze) at the 1991 Pan American Games in Havana, Cuba. He has three brothers, Eric, Eugenio, and Manuel. David attended the University of North Carolina at Chapel Hill, and earned an MBA from Indiana University Bloomington.
