= Manuel Guzmán =

Puerto Rican swimmer (born 1969)

Personal information
- Full name: Manuel Guzmán Flores
- Nationality: Puerto Rican
- Born: October 13, 1969 (age 56)

Sport
- Sport: Swimming
- Strokes: Backstroke and Freestyle
Medal record
Pan American Games
Bronze medal – third place	1991 Havana	200 m Backstroke
Bronze medal – third place	1991 Havana	4x100 m Freestyle
Bronze medal – third place	1991 Havana	4x200 m Freestyle

Manuel Guzmán Flores (born October 13, 1969) is a former international backstroke and freestyle swimmer from Puerto Rico, who participated in two consecutive Summer Olympics for his native country, starting in 1988. His best result was a 12th place in the Men's 4 × 100 m Freestyle Relay at the 1992 Summer Olympics in Barcelona, Spain. He graduated from Bloomington High School South in 1989 where he was an individual state champion and helped lead the team to a state runner-up finish.
