= Edgar de León =

Puerto Rican basketball player

Personal information
- Nationality: Puerto Rican
- Born: 2 November 1964 (age 60); Santurce, Puerto Rico

Sport
- Sport: Basketball

Edgar Francisco de León (born 2 November 1964) is a Puerto Rican basketball player. He competed in the men's tournament at the 1988 Summer Olympics and the 1992 Summer Olympics.
