= Angie Wester-Krieg =

American swimmer (born 1964)

Personal information
- Full name: Ina Angelika Wester-Krieg
- National team: United States
- Born: October 28, 1964 (age 61) Los Gatos, California, U.S.
- Height: 5 ft 5 in (1.65 m)
- Weight: 126 lb (57 kg)

Sport
- Sport: Swimming
- Strokes: Butterfly
- College team: San Jose State University
Medal record
Women's swimming
Representing the United States
Pan American Games
Gold medal – first place	1991 Havana	4x100 m medley
Silver medal – second place	1991 Havana	100 m butterfly
Silver medal – second place	1991 Havana	200 m butterfly
Bronze medal – third place	1995 Mar del Plata	100 m butterfly

Ina Angelika Wester-Krieg (born October 28, 1964) is an American former competition swimmer who represented the United States at the 1992 Summer Olympics in Barcelona, Spain. Wester-Krieg competed in the women's 200-meter butterfly, finishing sixth in the event final with a time of 2:11.46.

Wester-Krieg attended San Jose State University, where she swam for the San Jose State Spartans swimming and diving team in National Collegiate Athletic Association (NCAA) competition.

== See also ==
- List of San Jose State University people
