= Mario González (swimmer) =

Cuban swimmer (born 1975)

Personal information
- Full name: Mario González Montesinos
- Nationality: Cuba
- Born: August 2, 1975 (age 50) Havana, Cuba
- Height: 1.82 m (6 ft 0 in)
- Weight: 73 kg (161 lb)

Sport
- Sport: Swimming
- Strokes: Breaststroke
Medal record
Pan American Games
Gold medal – first place	1991 Havana	200m Breaststroke
Summer Universiade
Gold medal – first place	1993 Buffalo	200m Breaststroke
Bronze medal – third place	1993 Buffalo	100m Breaststroke

Mario González Montesinos (born August 2, 1975, in Havana, Cuba) is a former international breaststroke swimmer from Cuba, who participated in two consecutive Summer Olympics for his native country, starting in 1992. His best results were a gold medal at the Panamerican Games 1991 Havana in Havana and a tenth place at the 1996 Summer Olympics in Atlanta, Georgia both in the Men's 200m Breaststroke.

At the 1993 Central American and Caribbean Games, he set Championship Records in both the 100 and 200 breaststrokes (1:03.27 and 2:17.76). As of 2009, these are still the Games records.
