= Todd Torres =

Puerto Rican swimmer (born 1968)

Personal information
- Full name: Todd Torres Bost
- Born: June 11, 1968 (age 58) North Carolina, U.S.

Sport
- Sport: Swimming
- Strokes: Breaststroke and Freestyle
Medal record
Pan American Games
Representing Puerto Rico
Silver medal – second place	1991 Havana	100m breaststroke
Summer Universiade
Representing the United States
Gold medal – first place	1987 Zagreb	4x100m medley
Silver medal – second place	1987 Zagreb	200m breaststroke

Todd Torres (born June 11, 1968) is a former international breaststroke and freestyle swimmer from Puerto Rico, who participated in two consecutive Summer Olympics starting in 1992.

His best Olympic result was a 12th place in the Men's 4 × 100 m Freestyle Relay at the 1992 Summer Olympics in Barcelona, Spain. Torres also competed for the United States, winning a gold and a silver medal at the 1987 Summer Universiade in Zagreb.

Torres swam collegiately for Louisiana State University (LSU). At LSU, he was a 14-time All American and won a national and Southeastern Conference (SEC) championship in 1987. Torres also won another SEC Championship in the 200-yard breaststroke in 1988. In 2015 Swimmer Todd Torres was inducted to the Louisiana State University Athletic Hall of Fame and in 2019 was inducted to the North Carlolina Swimming Hall of Fame.
