= Gymnastics at the 1987 Pan American Games =

- Gymnastics pictograms
- Venues: Hoosier Dome (artistic); Indiana Convention Center (rhythmic)
- Start date: August 9, 1987
- End date: August 23, 1987
- No. of events: 19 (8 men, 11 women)
- Competitors: 114 from 13 nations

This page shows the results of the Gymnastics Competition at the 1987 Pan American Games in Indianapolis, United States. The rhythmic competition was held at the Indiana Convention Center (event capacity 5,000) from August 9 through 11th and had a cumulative of 13,508 in attendance. The artistic competition was held at the Hoosier Dome from August 12 through 23rd and had a cumulative of 81,549 in attendance.

== Medal summary ==
=== Medal table ===
Place	Nation	Gold medal	Silver medal	Bronze medal	Total
1	United States	12	9	7	28
2	Cuba	7	10	7	27
3	Canada	0	1	5	6
4	Brazil	0	0	2	2
4	Mexico	0	0	2	2
6	Puerto Rico	0	0	1	1
Total		19	20	24	63

=== Artistic Gymnastics ===
==== Men's Events ====
Games	Gold	Silver	Bronze
Team all-around	United States; Tim Daggett; Kevin Davis; Brian Ginsberg; Scott Johnson; Charles Lakes; Tom Schlesinger	Cuba; Félix Aguilera; Lázaro Amador; Luis Cartaya; José Fraga; Jesús Rivera; Casimiro Suarez	Brazil; Carlos Fulcher; Gerson Gnoatto; Marco Monteiro; Ricardo Nassar; Guilherme Pinto; Carlo Sabino
Individual all-around	Scott Johnson; United States	Casimiro Suarez; Cuba	Tim Daggett; United States
Floor exercise	Casimiro Suarez; Cuba	Scott Johnson; United States	Félix Aguilera; Cuba
Pommel horse	Tim Daggett; United States	Scott Johnson; United States	Félix Aguilera; Cuba Mario Gonzalez; Puerto Rico Tony Pineda; Mexico
Rings	Scott Johnson; United States	José Fraga; Cuba	Luis Cartaya; Cuba Brian Ginsberg; United States
Vault	Casimiro Suarez; Cuba	Scott Johnson; United States	Alejandro Peniche; Mexico
Parallel bars	Scott Johnson; United States	Casimiro Suarez; Cuba	Félix Aguilera; Cuba
Horizontal bar	Félix Aguilera; Cuba	Casimiro Suarez; Cuba Scott Johnson; United States	—N/a

=== Women's Events ===
==== Artistic Gymnastics ====
Event	Gold	Silver	Bronze
Individual all-around	Sabrina Mar; United States	Kristie Phillips; United States	Kelly Garrison-Steves; United States
Team all-around	United States; Rhonda Faehn; Kelly Garrison-Steves; Sabrina Mar; Melissa Marlowe; Kristie Phillips; Hope Spivey	Cuba; Elsa Chivas; Tonia Guia; Ibis Naredo; Luisa Prieto; Laura Rodríguez; Judith Villa	Canada; Andrea Conway; Yanic Giguere; Ildiko Hattayer; Mary MacKenzie; Amelie Major; Daphne Vallieres
Vault	Laura Rodríguez; Cuba	Luisa Prieto; Cuba	Kristie Phillips; United States
Uneven bars	Melissa Marlowe; United States	Sabrina Mar; United States	Luisa Parente; Brazil
Balance Beam	Kelly Garrison; United States	Tania Guia; Cuba	Elsa Chivas; Cuba
Balance Beam	Kelly Garrison; United States	Tania Guia; Cuba	Sabrina Mar; United States
Floor	Kristie Phillips; United States	Sabrina Mar; United States	Laura Rodríguez; Cuba

==== Rhythmic Gymnastics ====
Event	Gold	Silver	Bronze
Individual all-around	Lourdes Medina; Cuba	Diane Simpson; United States	Mary Fuzesi; Canada
Clubs	Lourdes Medina; Cuba	Mary Fuzesi; Canada	Susan Cushman; Canada
Clubs	Lourdes Medina; Cuba	Mary Fuzesi; Canada	Marina Kunyavsky; United States
Hoop	Lourdes Medina; Cuba	Diane Simpson; United States	Mary Fuzesi; Canada
Rope	Diane Simpson; United States	Lourdes Medina; Cuba	Marina Kunyavsky; United States
Ribbon	Diane Simpson; United States	Lourdes Medina; Cuba	Mary Fuzesi; Canada
Ribbon	Diane Simpson; United States	Lourdes Medina; Cuba	Thalia Fung; Cuba

== Men's artistic results ==
=== Team ===
RANK	TEAM	SCORE
Gold medal	United States; Tim Dagget; Kevin Davis; Brian Ginsberg; Scott Johnson; Charles Lakes; Tom Schlesinger	577.050
Silver medal	Cuba; Félix Aguilera; Lázaro Amador; Luis Cartaya; José Fraga; Jesús Rivera; Casimiro Suarez	550.900
Bronze medal	Brazil; Carlos Fulcher; Gerson Gnoatto; Marco Monteiro; Ricardo Nassar; Guilherme Pinto; Carlo Sabino	546.100
4.	Mexico; Jorge Carmarena; Licurgo Díaz; Oscar Figueroa; Luis Ordoñez; Alejandro Peniche; Tony Pineda	546.850
5.	Canada; Chuck Basler; Shaun Jaikaran; Alan Nolet; Robert Noory; Frank Nutzenberger; Brad Peters	540.050
6.	Puerto Rico; Victor Colon; Mario Gonzalez; Alexis Moreno; José Rosa; Ramón Rosado; Héctor Tanco	527.950

=== All-around ===
RANK	GYMNAST	SCORE
Gold medal	Scott Johnson (USA)	116.250
Silver medal	Casimiro Suarez (CUB)	115.500
Bronze medal	Tim Daggett (USA)	115.050
4.	Félix Aguilera (CUB)	115.000
5.	Brian Ginsberg (USA)	114.425
6.	Lázaro Amador (CUB)	113.600
7.	Brad Peters (CAN)	111.850
8.	Guilherme Pinto (BRA)	110.225
9.	Gerson Gnoatto (BRA)	110.075
10.	Alan Nolet (CAN)	110.025
11.	Mario Gonzalez (PUR)	109.925
12.	Alejandro Peniche (MEX)	109.750
13.	Licurgo Díaz (MEX)	108.550
14.	Carlos Fulcher (BRA)	108.350
15.	Frank Nutzenberger (CAN)	107.125
16.	Diego Lopez (ARG)	105.725
17.	Alexis Moreno (PUR)	105.050
18.	Luis Ordoñez (MEX)	103.675
19.	Héctor Salazar (PER)	103.575
20.	Victor Colon (PUR)	100.400
21.	Eric Heikla (ISV)	100.350

=== Floor exercise ===
RANK	FINAL RANKING	SCORE
Gold medal	Casimiro Suarez (CUB)	19.475
Silver medal	Scott Johnson (USA)	19.425
Bronze medal	Félix Aguilera (CUB)	19.175
4.	Alan Nolet (CAN)	19.050
5.	Alejandro Peniche (MEX)	19.050
6.	Tony Pineda (MEX)	19.025
7.	Brian Ginsberg (USA)	19.000
8.	Guilherme Pinto (BRA)	18.975

=== Pommel horse ===
RANK	FINAL RANKING	SCORE
Gold medal	Tim Daggett (USA)	19.500
Silver medal	Scott Johnson (USA)	19.200
Bronze medal	Félix Aguilera (CUB)	19.150
Bronze medal	Mario Gonzalez (PUR)	19.150
Bronze medal	Tony Pineda (MEX)	19.150
6.	Lázaro Amador (CUB)	19.000
7.	Brad Peters (CAN)	18.850
8.	Carlo Sabino (BRA)	18.600

=== Rings ===
RANK	FINAL RANKING	SCORE
Gold medal	Scott Johnson (USA)	19.450
Silver medal	José Fraga (CUB)	19.375
Bronze medal	Luis Cartaya (CUB)	19.350
Bronze medal	Brian Ginsberg (USA)	19.350
5.	Brad Peters (CAN)	18.975
6.	Alejandro Peniche (MEX)	18.925
7.	Carlos Fulcher (BRA)	18.125
8.	Héctor Tanco (PUR)	17.675

=== Vault ===
RANK	FINAL RANKING	SCORE
Gold medal	Casimiro Suarez (CUB)	19.500
Silver medal	Scott Johnson (USA)	19.413
Bronze medal	Alejandro Peniche (MEX)	19.325
4.	Félix Aguilera (CUB)	19.100
5.	Brian Ginsberg (USA)	18.950
6.	Alan Nolet (CAN)	18.888
7.	Ricardo Nassar (BRA)	18.575
8.	Alexis Moreno (PUR)	18.525

=== Parallel bars ===
RANK	FINAL RANKING	SCORE
Gold medal	Scott Johnson (USA)	19.575
Silver medal	Casimiro Suarez (CUB)	19.550
Bronze medal	Félix Aguilera (CUB)	19.225
4.	Guilherme Pinto (BRA)	19.125
5.	Tony Pineda (MEX)	19.050
6.	Tim Daggett (USA)	18.775
6.	Carlos Fulcher (BRA)	18.775
8.	Licurgo Díaz (MEX)	18.525

=== Horizontal bar ===
RANK	FINAL RANKING	SCORE
Gold medal	Félix Aguilera (CUB)	19.725
Silver medal	Casimiro Suarez (CUB)	19.625
Silver medal	Scott Johnson (USA)	19.625
4.	Tim Daggett (USA)	19.525
5.	Tony Pineda (MEX)	19.325
6.	Gerson Gnoatto (BRA)	19.200
7.	Guilherme Pinto (BRA)	19.175
8.	Brad Peters (CAN)	18.075

== Women's artistic results ==
=== Team ===
RANK	TEAM	SCORE
Gold medal	United States; Rhonda Faehn; Kelly Garrison-Steves; Sabrina Mar; Melissa Marlowe; Kristie Phillips; Hope Spivey	385.950
Silver medal	Cuba; Elsa Chivas; Tonia Guia; Ibis Naredo; Luisa Prieto; Laura Rodríguez; Judith Villa	376.375
Bronze medal	Canada; Andrea Conway; Yanic Giguere; Ildiko Hattayer; Mary MacKenzie; Amelie Major; Daphne Vallieres	368.725
4.	Brazil; Marian Fernandes; Tatiana Figueiredo; Vanda Oliveira; Altair Prado; Luisa Parente; Priscila Steinberger	364.275
5.	Puerto Rico; Beatriz Collazo; Beatriz Corteguera; Adriana Duffy; Michelle Sandoz; Mailara Santana; Mariceli Snyder	337.950
6.	Argentina; Mariana Alvarino; Mariana Falcioni; María Ibarrondo; Gabriela Lobato; Marina Magas; Gabriela Sobrado	352.250
7.	Venezuela; Ariana Carrera; Oriana Mendez; Paola Rodriguez; Adriana Ruiz; Aida Ubeto	352.250

=== All-around ===
RANK	FINAL RANKING	SCORE
Gold medal	Sabrina Mar (USA)	77.975
Silver medal	Kristie Phillips (USA)	77.362
Bronze medal	Kelly Garrison-Steves (USA)	77.300
4.	Luisa Parente (BRA)	75.400
5.	Tania Guia (CUB)	75.000
6.	Laura Rodríguez (CUB)	74.987
7.	Elsa Chivas (CUB)	74.900
8.	Tatiana Figueiredo (BRA)	74.312
9.	Yanic Giguere (CAN)	74.300
10.	Andrea Conway (CAN)	74.150
10.	María Flores (GUA)	74.150
12.	Amelie Major (CAN)	73.737
13.	Oriana Mendez (VEN)	73.700
14.	Beatriz Corteguera (PUR)	73.237
15.	Marian Fernandes (BRA)	72.900
16.	Adriana Duffy (PUR)	72.600
17.	Mailara Santana (PUR)	71.600
18.	Gabriela Lobato (ARG)	70.112
19.	Marina Magas (ARG)	69.925
20.	María Ibarrondo (ARG)	69.775
21.	Adriana Ruiz (VEN)	69.262
22.	Aida Ubeto (VEN)	67.837
23.	Nalda Savinon (DOM)	67.675

=== Vault ===
RANK	FINAL RANKING	SCORE
Gold medal	Laura Rodríguez (CUB)	19.582
Silver medal	Luisa Prieto (CUB)	19.450
Bronze medal	Kristie Phillips (USA)	19.256
4.	Rhonda Faehn (USA)	19.218
5.	Oriana Mendez (VEN)	19.118
6.	Tatiana Figueiredo (BRA)	18.900
7.	Adriana Ruiz (VEN)	18.787
8.	Adriana Duffy (PUR)	18.550

=== Uneven bars ===
RANK	FINAL RANKING	SCORE
Gold medal	Melissa Marlowe (USA)	19.637
Silver medal	Sabrina Mar (USA)	19.512
Bronze medal	Luisa Parente (BRA)	19.263
4.	Elsa Chivas (CUB)	18.925
5.	María Flores (GUA)	18.900
6.	Mary MacKenzie (CAN)	18.787
7.	Laura Rodríguez (CUB)	18.737
8.	Tatiana Figueiredo (BRA)	18.338

=== Balance beam ===
RANK	FINAL RANKING	SCORE
Gold medal	Kelly Garrison-Steves (USA)	19.338
Silver medal	Tania Guia (CUB)	19.287
Bronze medal	Elsa Chivas (CUB)	19.263
Bronze medal	Sabrina Mar (USA)	19.263
5.	Ildiko Hattayer (CAN)	18.675
6.	Michelle Sandoz (PUR)	18.275
7.	María Flores (GUA)	18.125
8.	Mailara Santana (PUR)	17.075

=== Floor exercise ===
RANK	FINAL RANKING	SCORE
Gold medal	Kristie Phillips (USA)	19.538
Silver medal	Sabrina Mar (USA)	19.425
Bronze medal	Laura Rodríguez (CUB)	18.987
4.	Andrea Conway (CAN)	18.937
5.	María Flores (GUA)	18.662
6.	Beatriz Corteguera (PUR)	18.650
7.	Mary MacKenzie (CAN)	18.525
8.	Ibis Naredo (CUB)	18.325

== See also ==
- Pan American Gymnastics Championships
- South American Gymnastics Championships
- Gymnastics at the 1988 Summer Olympics
