= Jason Y. Ng =

Hong Kong-born Canadian author, news columnist and a social activist

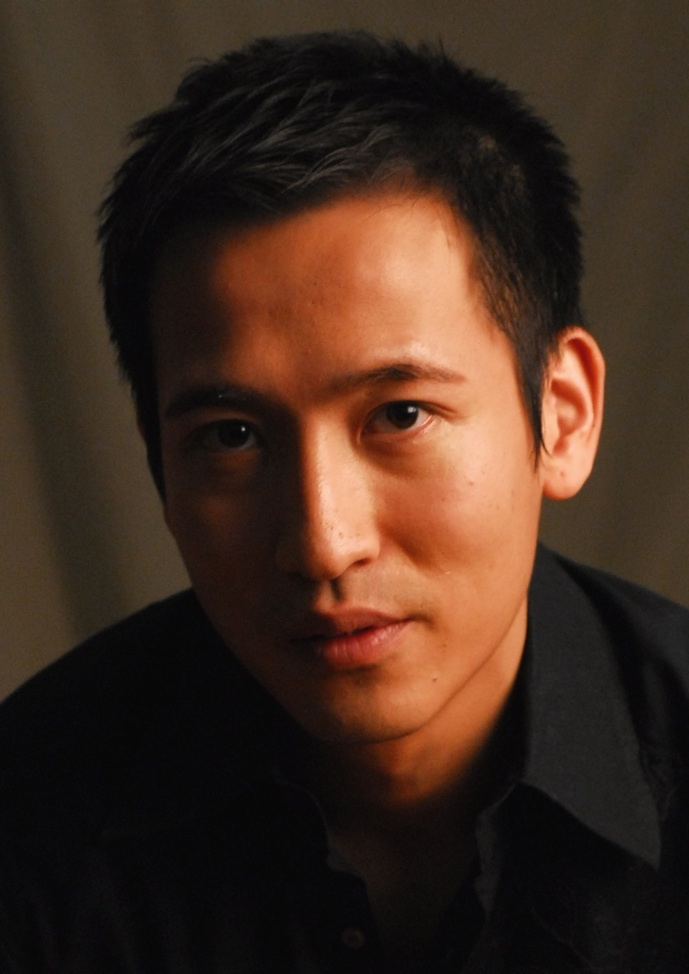
- Born: Hong Kong
- Education: Wharton School of the University of Pennsylvania, University of Toronto, United World College of the Adriatic
- Occupations: Writer; news columnist; lawyer
- Writing career
- Period: 2000s-present
- Website: www.jasonyng.com

Jason Y. Ng is a Hong Kong-born Canadian author, news columnist and social activist for various progressive causes.

== Background ==
Ng was born in Hong Kong and moved to Italy when he was a child, around 1985, and lived in the United States and Canada before returning to Hong Kong in 2005. He earned a bachelor's degree in finance from the Wharton School of the University of Pennsylvania and holds a Juris Doctor and Master of Business Administration from the University of Toronto. Ng is admitted to the New York bar and the Massachusetts bar.

Ng's parents were born in Taishan, Guangdong in the People's Republic of China. They lived in Hong Kong, where his father was a newspaper illustrator until the late 1980s, when they emigrated to Canada.

== Career ==
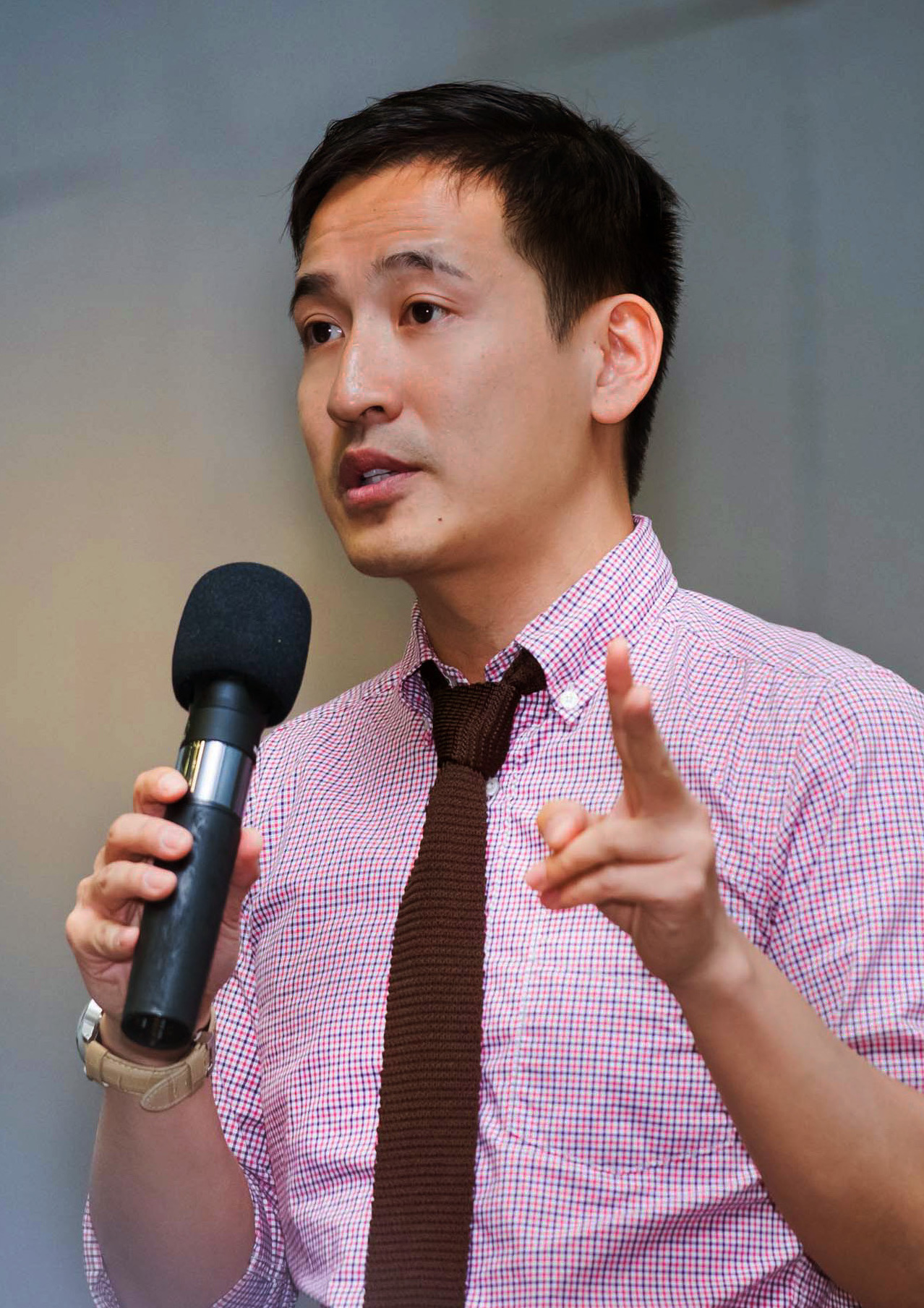
Ng delivering a keynote speech in 2013.

Ng is the author of four books about Hong Kong: HONG KONG State of Mind (2010), No City for Slow Men (2013), Umbrellas in Bloom (2016) and Unfree Speech (2020). His books have been translated into many languages. Ng also co-edited Hong Kong 20/20 (2017) and Hong Kong Noir (2019), the Hong Kong edition of Akashic Books' internationally "Noir" series.

Ng contributes opinion columns to the South China Morning Post and Hong Kong Free Press and news pieces and commentary to the Guardian. Between 2014 and 2016, he was a classical music and opera critic for Hong Kong Time Out.

Between October 2016 (inception) and April 2019, Ng served as the inaugural President of PEN Hong Kong, the local chapter of PEN International that promotes literature and defends freedom of expression around the world. He is also an ambassador for Shark Savers Hong Kong and frequent advocate for Hong Kong's pro-democracy movement, free expression, and the rights of foreign domestic helpers in Hong Kong.

In 2019, Ng was elected Co-convener of the Progressive Lawyers Group, a group of Hong Kong-based lawyers dedicated to promoting rule of law and civil liberties.

== Controversial comments on Beijing loyalists ==
In September 2019, Ng made comments in several posts on his personal Facebook page during the anti-extradition protest in Hong Kong, which included words "monkey see, monkey do" when referring to Chinese mainlanders. The post prompted outrage among Chinese netizens.

In a statement on BNP Paribas's global website, the French bank apologised for "the offence caused by those social media posts that were expressed on one of [its] employees’ personal accounts", and added that while it respects its employees’ freedom of expression, it does not tolerate "language that is racist or disrespectful". In an interview with CNBC, Jean Lemierre, chairman of BNP Paribas, said that Ng's "inappropriate words were not compatible at all with the standards of the bank".

A few days later, Ng issued a public statement, stating that "It isn’t my fault that a common North American expression I used has been misconstrued and twisted to political ends. It isn’t my fault that I’ve become the latest target of vicious cyberbullying and doxxing. But that isn’t the scary part. What worries me most is that the same can happen to anyone in China."

In the same month, Ng left BNP Paribas, which he first joined in 2007.

== Position on use of violence in political protests ==
In December 2018, Ng wrote an op-ed for South China Morning Post titled "What France’s ‘yellow vests’ can teach Hong Kong activists about political protests and the use of violence", in which he compared the political situations in France and Hong Kong and raised doubts over the use of violence in Hong Kong's pro-democracy movement with the observation that "to subscribe to [the] argument [that violence works] is to ignore several key cultural and political differences that shaped the two uprisings."

In a January 2020 interview with Agence France-Presse in Barcelona, Ng itinerated his belief in nonviolent civil disobedience as a means to achieving political goals and that violence would not bring about the desired change in Hong Kong. "Using violence is a slippery slope... You sort of become addicted to media attention by creating more violence and I don’t want that to happen in Hong Kong."

== Honors ==
In 2011, Ng was named "Man of the Year" by Elle Men magazine. In 2013, Hong Kong State of Mind was chosen as the book prize for the Harvard Book Award in Hong Kong. In the following year, No City for Slow Men was chosen as the book prize for the same award for that year.

== Bibliography ==
=== Non-fiction ===
- Hong Kong State of Mind: 37 Views of a City That Doesn't Blink, Blacksmith Books, Hong Kong, 2010, ISBN 978-9881900319
- No City for Slow Men: Hong Kong's Quirks and Quandaries Laid Bare, Blacksmith Books, Hong Kong, 2013, ISBN 978-9881613875
- Umbrellas in Bloom: Hong Kong's Occupy Movement Uncovered, Blacksmith Books, Hong Kong, 2016, ISBN 978-9881376534
- Unfree Speech: The Threat to Global Democracy and Why We Must Act, Now, co-authored with Joshua Wong, Penguin Books, The United Kingdom, 2020, ISBN 978-0753554791

=== Short fiction anthologies ===
- As We See It: Hong Kong Stories (co-editors: Ryan Harper, Danielle Lowry), Hong Kong Writers Circle, 2012, ISBN 978-9889836689
- The Queen of Statue Square: New Short Fiction from Hong Kong (co-editors: Xu Xi, Marshall Moore), Critical, Cultural & Communications Press, 2014, ISBN 978-1905510436
- Hong Kong Future Perfect: One City, Twenty Visions of What Is To Come (co-editors: Peter Humphreys, Elizabeth Solomon), Hong Kong Writers Circle, 2016, ISBN 978-9881685872
- HK24: Twenty-Four Hours of Hong Kong Stories (editor: Stewart McKay), Hong Kong Writers Circle, 2017, ISBN 978-9881685896
- Hong Kong 20/20: Reflections on a Borrowed Place (co-editors: Jason Y. Ng, Tammy Ho, et al.), Blacksmith Books, 2017, ISBN 978-9887792765
- Hong Kong Highs and Lows: (editor: Chris Maden), Hong Kong Writers Circle, 2018, ISBN 978-9881685919
- Hong Kong Noir (co-editors: Jason Y. Ng, Susan Blumberg-Kason), Akashic Books, 2019, ISBN 978-1617756726
- Coming to Our Senses (editor: Joy Al-Sofi), Hong Kong Writers Circle, 2019, ISBN 978-9881685933
- Masking the City (editor: Nathan Lauer), Hong Kong Writers Circle, 2020, ISBN 978-9881685957
- After the Storm (editor: Paul Clinton Carrigon), Hong Kong Writers Circle, 2021, ISBN 978-9881685971
- Flux (editor: Nathan Lauer, Dominic Sargent), Hong Kong Writers Circle, forthcoming 2022
