= Gymnastics at the 1990 South American Games =

Gymnastics events were competed at the 1990 South American Games in Lima, Peru, in December 1990.

== Medal summary ==
=== Medal table ===
Rank	Nation	Gold	Silver	Bronze	Total
1	Brazil (BRA)	13	8	3	24
2	Argentina (ARG)	7	15	5	27
3	Peru (PER)	0	1	5	6
4	Venezuela (VEN)	0	1	1	2
5	Chile (CHI)	0	0	2	2
Totals (5 entries)		20	25	16	61

=== Artistic gymnastics ===
Event	Gold	Silver	Bronze
Men
Team all-around	Brazil; Adriano Engelke; Gilberto Figueira; André Monteiro; Marco Monteiro; Ricardo Nassar; Fernando Teixeira	Argentina; Sergio Alvariño; Walter Chaio; Robert Conte; Martín González; Fabio Ricci	Peru; James Peña
Individual all-around	Marco Monteiro (BRA)	Walter Chaio (ARG)	Manuel Bejarano (VEN)
Floor exercise	Adriano Engelke (BRA)	Sergio Alvariño (ARG)	James Peña (PER)
Pommel horse	Robert Conte (ARG)	Walter Chaio (ARG) André Monteiro (BRA)	—N/a
Rings	Sergio Alvariño (ARG)	Robert Conte (ARG)	Ricardo Nassar (BRA)
Vault	Adriano Engelke (BRA)	Manuel Bejarano (VEN)	Marcelo Toledo (CHI)
Parallel bars	Marco Monteiro (BRA)	Walter Chaio (ARG)	Martín González (ARG)
Horizontal bar	Martín González (ARG)	Marco Monteiro (BRA)	Ricardo Nassar (BRA)
Women
Team all-around	Argentina; Karina Oliveira; Andrea Giordano; Gabriela Sobrado; Lucía Peirano; Andrea Kobelinski; María Laura Dzwonik	Brazil; Luisa Parente; Soraya Carvalho; Viviane Cardoso; Adriana Andrade; Debora Biffe; Iracema Andori; Claudia Garcia	Peru; Mariana Cuadra
Individual all-around	Luisa Parente (BRA)	Karina Oliveira (ARG)	Andrea Giordano (ARG)
Vault	Luisa Parente (BRA)	Mariana Cuadra (PER)	Gabriela Sobrado (ARG)
Uneven bars	Luisa Parente (BRA)	Gabriela Sobrado (ARG)	Viviane Cardoso (BRA)
Balance beam	Gabriela Sobrado (ARG)	Luisa Parente (BRA)	María González (CHI)
Floor exercise	Andrea Giordano (ARG)	Karina Oliveira (ARG)	Mariana Cuadra (PER)

=== Rhythmic gymnastics ===
Event	Gold	Silver	Bronze
Team all-around	Argentina; Barbara Bessolo; Zarina Fabre; Julieta Torres; Daniela Wall	Brazil; Françoise Biot; Debora Sana; Martha Schonhorst; Fernanda Simbemberg	Peru
Individual all-around	Martha Schonhorst (BRA)	Daniela Wall (ARG)	Julieta Torres (ARG)
Hoop	Martha Schonhorst (BRA)	Debora Sana (BRA) Daniela Wall (ARG) Julieta Torres (ARG)	—N/a
Ball	Martha Schonhorst (BRA)	Debora Sana (BRA) Daniela Wall (ARG)	—N/a
Rope	Martha Schonhorst (BRA)	Barbara Bessolo (ARG) Zarina Fabre (ARG)	—N/a
Ribbon	Martha Schonhorst (BRA)	Fernanda Simbemberg (BRA)	Zarina Fabre (ARG)
