= 1988 South American Artistic Gymnastics Championships =

International artistic gymnastics competition

The 1988 South American Artistic Gymnastics Championships were held in Rosario, Argentina, October 1988. It was the sixth edition of the South American Artistic Gymnastics Championships.

== Participating nations ==
- Argentina
- Brazil
- Colombia
- Venezuela

== Medalists ==
Event	Gold	Silver	Bronze
Men
Team all-around	Brazil; Ricardo Nassar; Marco Monteiro; Gustavo Boschi; Adriano Engenkel; Marcelo Azeredo; Irano Carvalho	Argentina; Martín González; Gabriel Bayeto; Gustavo Sito; Sergio Alvariño; Miguel Bardeggia; Walter Chaio	Unknown
Individual all-around	Walter Chaio (ARG)	Gustavo Boschi (BRA)	Irano Carvalho (BRA)
Women
Team all-around	Argentina; Karina Oliveira; Romina Plataroti; Gabriela Sobrado; Andrea Giordano; Marcela Roldán; Carolina Gentile	Brazil; Luisa Parente; Simone Boratto; Anne Fernandes; Daniela Mesquita; Viviane Cardoso; Adriana Andrade	Colombia
Individual all-around	Karina Oliveira (ARG)	Romina Plataroti (ARG)	Luisa Parente (BRA)
