= 1989 Pan American Gymnastics Cup =

Gymnastics cup

The 1989 Pan American Gymnastics Cup was held in Victoria, Mexico, July 24–29, 1989.

== Medalists ==
=== Artistic gymnastics ===
Event	Gold	Silver	Bronze
Men
Team all-around	Unknown	Unknown	Brazil; Ricardo Nassar; Marco Monteiro; Fernando Sabino
Individual all-around	Alejandro Peniche (MEX)	Tony Piñeda (MEX)	Raul Menendez (CUB)
Floor exercise	Ricardo Nassar (BRA) Alejandro Peniche (MEX)	—N/a	Unknown
Vault	Alejandro Peniche (MEX)	Manuel Bejarano (VEN)	Ricardo Nassar (BRA)
Pommel horse	Tony Piñeda (MEX)	Raul Menendez (CUB)	Marco Monteiro (BRA)
Parallel bars	Unknown	Unknown	Zac Lee (USA)
Horizontal bar	Unknown	Unknown	Isidro Ibarrondo (ARG)
Women
Team all-around	United States; Tracey Cole; Robin Richter; Agina Simpkins	Brazil; Luisa Parente; Viviane Cardoso; Adriana Andrade	Cuba; Laura Rodriguez; Luisa Prieto
Individual all-around	Luisa Parente (BRA)	Tracey Cole (USA)	Oriana Mendez (VEN)
Vault	Luisa Prieto (CUB)	Luisa Parente (BRA)	Tracey Cole (USA)
Uneven bars	Luisa Parente (BRA)	Unknown	Tracey Cole (USA)
Balance beam	Romina Plataroti (ARG)	Fernanda Rodríguez (MEX)	Tracey Cole (USA)
Floor exercise	Romina Plataroti (ARG)	Tracey Cole (USA)	Unknown

=== Rhythmic gymnastics ===
Event	Gold	Silver	Bronze
Rope	Unknown	Françoise Biot (BRA)	Rosana Favila (BRA)
Hoop	Françoise Biot (BRA) Marta Schonhurst (BRA)	None awarded	Unknown
Ball	Unknown	Marta Schonhurst (BRA)	Rosana Favila (BRA)
Ribbon	Unknown	Marta Schonhurst (BRA)	Rosana Favila (BRA)

== Results ==
=== Artistic gymnastics ===
==== Men's all-around ====
Rk.	Name	NOC	Score
1st place, gold medalist(s)	Alejandro Peniche	Mexico	57.050
2nd place, silver medalist(s)	Tony Piñeda	Mexico	56.900
3rd place, bronze medalist(s)	Raul Menendez	Cuba	54.400
4	Felix Aguilera	Cuba	53.300
5	Marco Monteiro	Brazil	–
6	Ricardo Nassar	Brazil	–
7	Manuel Bejarano	Venezuela	–
8	Isidro Ibarrondo	Argentina	–
9	Jose Tort	Puerto Rico	–
10	Brandy Wood	United States	–

==== Women's all-around ====
Rk.	Name	NOC	Score
1st place, gold medalist(s)	Luisa Parente	Brazil	38.325
2nd place, silver medalist(s)	Tracey Cole	United States	37.900
3rd place, bronze medalist(s)	Oriana Mendez	Venezuela	37.100
4	Laura Rodriguez	Cuba	36.950
5	Viviane Cardoso	Brazil	36.675
6	Romina Plataroti	Argentina	–
7	Agina Simpkins	United States	–
8	Veronica Fadua	Mexico	–
9	Fernanda Rodríguez	Mexico	–
10	Luciana Peirano	Argentina	–
11	Beatriz Collazo	Peru	–
12	Claudia Cardona	Colombia	–
13	Mariana Cuadra	Puerto Rico	–
14	Ximena Diaz	Colombia	–
15	Ines Salas	Peru	–
16	Luisa Prieto	Cuba	–
17	Carla Hernandez	El Salvador	–
18	Sonia Aguilar	El Salvador	–
