= Luísa Ribeiro =

Brazilian gymnast (born 1973)

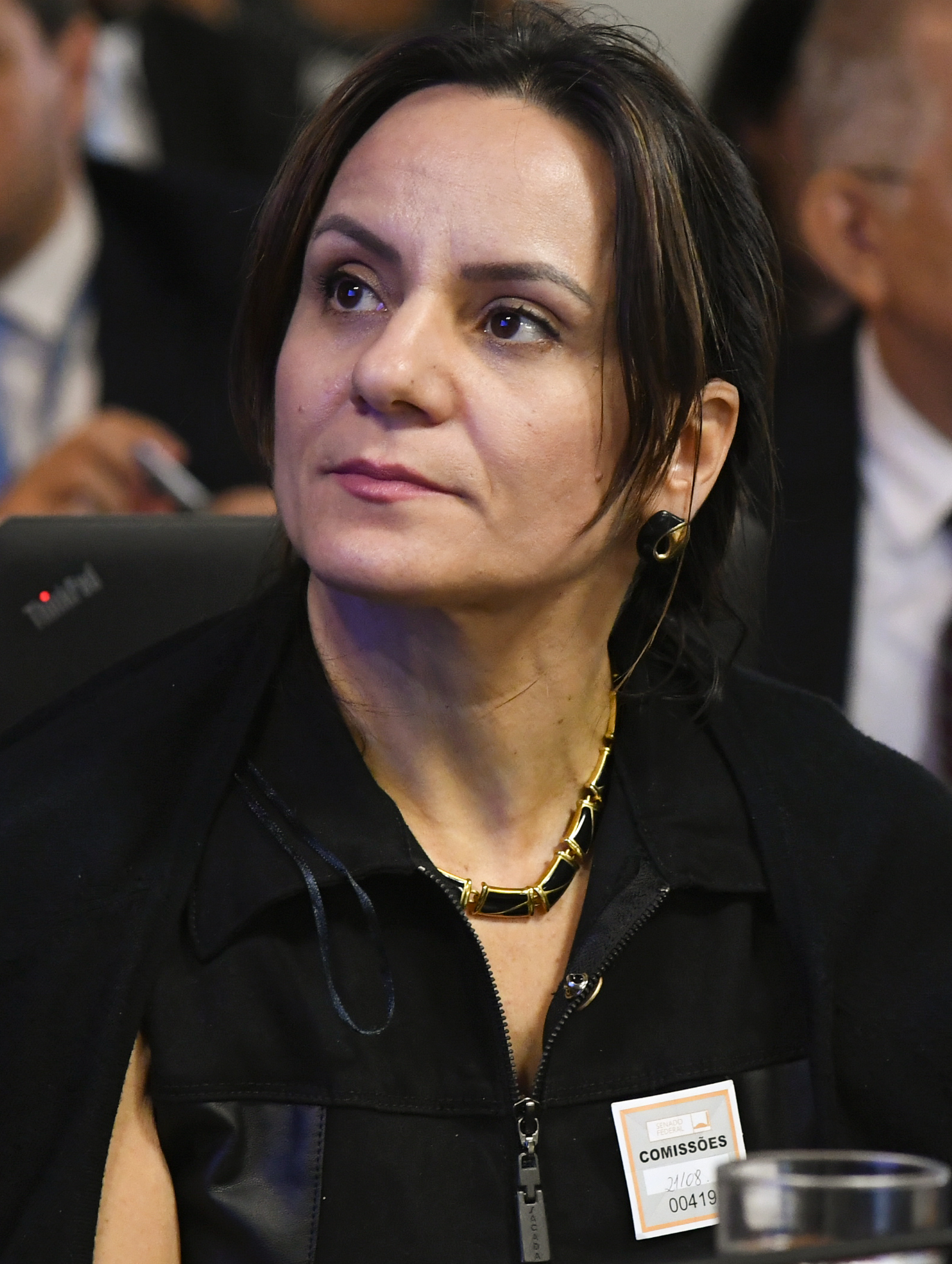
- Full name: Luísa Parente Ribeiro de Carvalho
- Born: 1 February 1973 (age 53) Rio de Janeiro, Brazil

Gymnastics career
- Discipline: Women's artistic gymnastics
- Country represented: Brazil
- Club: Clube de Regatas do Flamengo
- Former coaches: Jesús Carballo, Béla Károlyi
Medal record
Representing Brazil
Women's artistic gymnastics
Summer Universiade
Silver medal – second place	1993 Buffalo	Vault
Pan American Games
Gold medal – first place	1991 Havana	Vault
Gold medal – first place	1991 Havana	Uneven bars
Bronze medal – third place	1987 Indianapolis	Uneven bars
Pan American Cup
Gold medal – first place	1989 Victoria	All-around
Gold medal – first place	1989 Victoria	Uneven bars
Silver medal – second place	1989 Victoria	Team
Silver medal – second place	1989 Victoria	Vault
South American Games
Gold medal – first place	1990 Lima	All-around
Gold medal – first place	1990 Lima	Vault
Gold medal – first place	1990 Lima	Uneven bars
Silver medal – second place	1990 Lima	Team
Silver medal – second place	1990 Lima	Balance beam
South American Championships
Silver medal – second place	1988 Rosario	Team
Bronze medal – third place	1988 Rosario	All-around

Luísa Parente Ribeiro de Carvalho (born 1 February 1973) is a Brazilian gymnast. She competed at the 1988 Summer Olympics and the 1992 Summer Olympics.
