= Asia Society =

Non-profit organization based in New York City

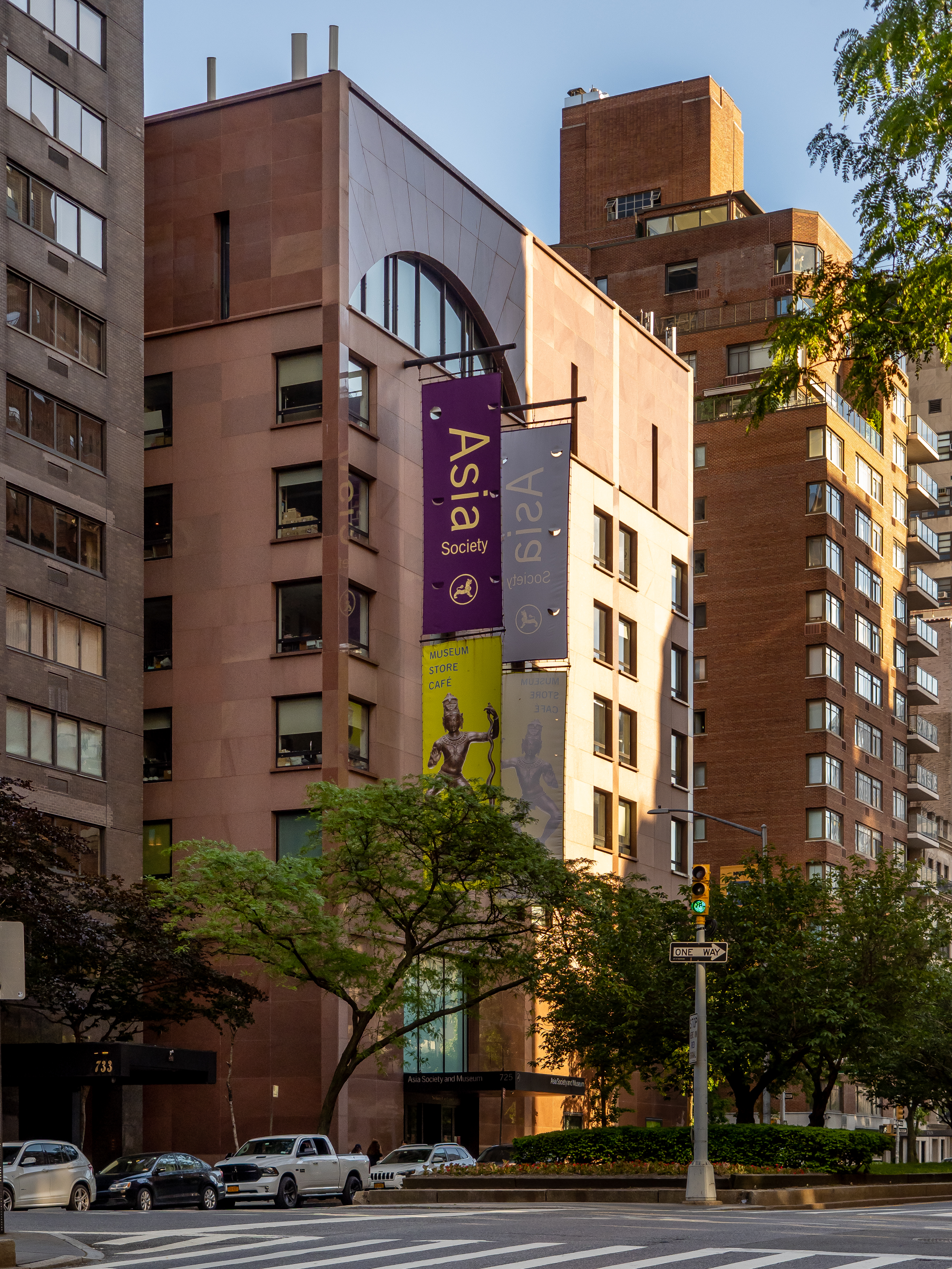
- Asia Society's Manhattan headquarters and museum designed by Edward Larrabee Barnes and John MY Lee Architects
- Established: 1956; 70 years ago
- Type: 501(c)(3) organization
- Tax ID no.: 13-3234632
- Headquarters: 725 Park Avenue; New York City 10021; U.S.
- Coordinates: 40.7698°N 73.9643°W
- Global President and CEO: Kevin Rudd
- Revenue: $31 million USD (2019)
- Website: www.asiasociety.org

The Asia Society is a 501(c)(3) organization that focuses on educating the world about Asia. It has several centers in the United States (Manhattan, Washington, D.C., Houston, Los Angeles, San Francisco and Seattle) and around the world (Hong Kong, Manila, Seoul, Melbourne, Sydney, Tokyo, Mumbai, Delhi, Paris and Zurich). The Society's headquarters are in New York City, and includes a museum that exhibits pre-modern, modern, and contemporary art from Asia, Oceania and the Asian diaspora. Asia Society also publishes an online magazine, ChinaFile.

In January 2024, Kyung-wha Kang, who served as the first female Minister of Foreign Affairs of South Korea, from 2017 to 2021, was named its president and CEO, effective in April 2024; in October 2025, she stood down to become South Korea's ambassador to the United States; former president and CEO, Kevin Rudd, returned to that position in March 2026, having resigned early from his role as Australian ambassador to the United States. Asia Society has sometimes been described by the Chinese Communist Party (CCP) as a participant in its "backchannel" diplomatic efforts with the United States government. Others have disputed any characterization of the Asia Society as speaking on behalf of the United States in track II diplomacy.

== History ==
Asia Society logo (1997–2021).

The Asia Society was founded in 1956 by John D. Rockefeller 3rd. In 1974, Rockefeller donated 300 objects of Asian art (worth between $10 and $15 million) to the Asia Society.

The Asia Society's original focus was explaining aspects about Asia to Americans, and Robin Pogrebin of The New York Times said that it was "[l]ong regarded as a New York institution with regional branches". Around 2011, the society was refocusing efforts on augmenting partnerships amongst Asians and between Asians and Americans in business, culture, education, and public policy. In 2011, Pogrebin said "over the last few years [it] has aimed to recast itself as an international organization, partly through the construction of the two major centers in Houston and Hong Kong where it previously had only offices". The organization's records are held at the Rockefeller Archive Center in Sleepy Hollow, New York.

== Buildings ==
=== Headquarters ===
The Society's Manhattan headquarters, at Park Avenue and East 70th Street on the Upper East Side, is a nine-story building faced in smooth red Oklahoma granite designed by Edward Larrabee Barnes / John M.Y. Lee Architects in 1980. Barnes gave the building a strong facade to continue the line along Park, and set it back from East 70th with a terraced garden buffering it between the street and the older houses on that block. The semicircular window on the upper story and variations in the color and finish of the granite are intended to evoke Asian cultures. Paul Goldberger, architecture critic at The New York Times, called it "an ambitious building, full of civilized intentions, some of which succeed and others that do not". In the former category he put the interiors and the overall shape; in the latter he included the facade.

In 1999, it was closed for 18 months so that new interiors, designed by Bartholomew Voorsanger, could be built. During that time the society used the former Christie's Manhattan offices on 59th Street as a temporary home. The completed renovation included a 24-foot-high (7.3 m) atrium and cafe. The expansion doubled the museum's exhibition space, allowing the society space for special exhibitions in addition to displaying the Rockefeller Asian art collection on display.

Robin Pogrebin of The New York Times said in 2011 that the Asia Society is "perhaps best known for the elegance of its headquarters and galleries on Park Avenue at 70th Street".

=== Global expansion ===
==== Asia Society Hong Kong Center ====
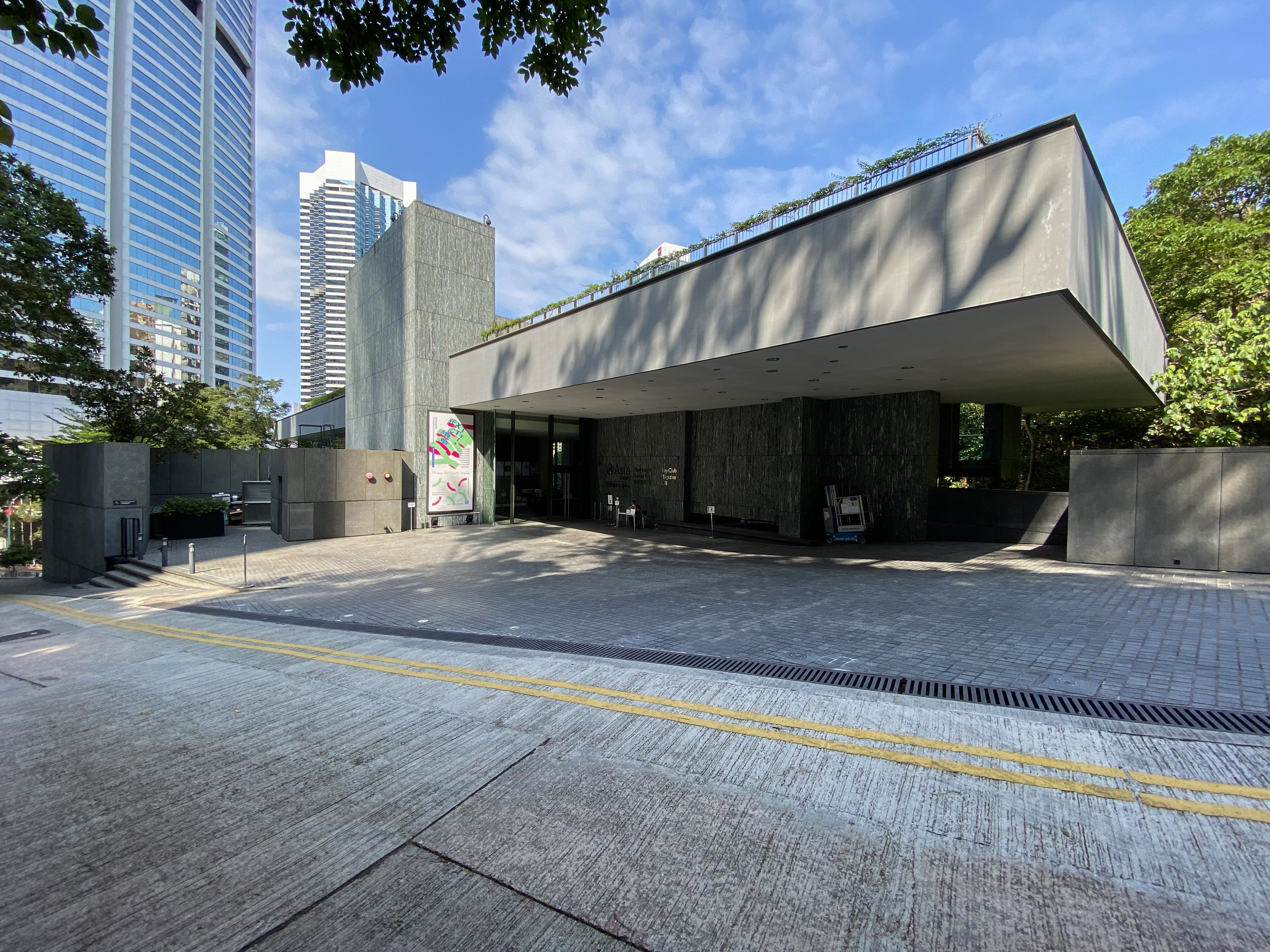
Asia Society Hong Kong Center

2012 marked a major expansion, with the opening of multimillion-dollar buildings in Hong Kong and Houston, Texas. The Hong Kong complex, dedicated on February 9, 2012, is situated on the site of a former British military explosives magazine overlooking Victoria Harbour and includes numerous restored military buildings. The project was designed by architects Tod Williams and Billie Tsien. The Asia Society Hong Kong Center was established in 1990.

==== Asia Society Texas Center in Houston ====
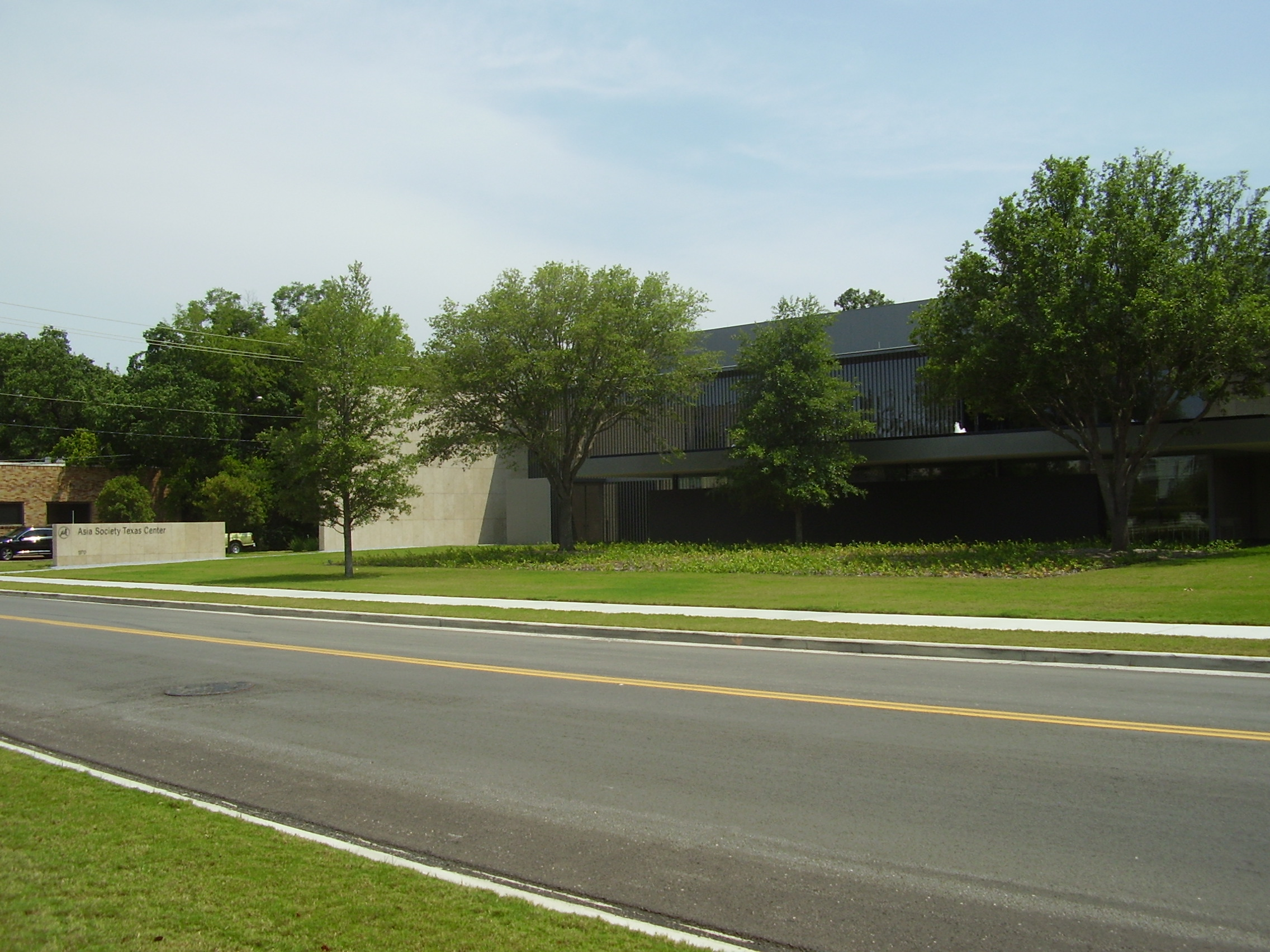
Asia Society Texas Center in Houston

The Texas Center first opened in 1979. The current 40,000-square-foot (3,700 m^{2}) building, located in the city's museum district, opened on May 6, 2012, and was designed by architect Yoshio Taniguchi. With a cost of $50 million, the Texas Center has a modernist style and was built with German-origin Jura limestone personally inspected by Taniguchi and his employees. The building includes glass walls, steam generated from the roofline, and a garden as significant elements.

==== Asia Society Northern California ====
The Northern California Center was established in 1998 in the San Francisco Bay Area.

=== New York Museum ===
At its 70th Street headquarters, The Asia Society Museum is host to traditional, modern and contemporary exhibitions, film screenings, literary events and performances. The holdings include works that date from the eleventh century BCE to the nineteenth century CE and include Chinese ceramics of the Song and Ming periods as well as works by contemporary Asian and Asian diaspora artists. The museum's collection of traditional objects stems from a donation from Asia Society founder John D. Rockefeller 3rd and Blanchette Ferry Hooker Rockefeller, who contributed a number of items in 1978. The society began actively collecting contemporary Asian art with a 2007 initiative. A major renovation was completed in 2001, doubling the size of the four public galleries and expanding space for educational programming and including conference spaces and an auditorium.

The headquarters also houses a museum shop and café. Forbes has listed the Garden Court Cafe (now the Leo Café) on its All-Star Eateries in New York list several times.

== Leadership ==
In January 2026, Kevin Rudd was reappointed as its president and CEO, effective in March 2026; he had previously served in that role from 2021 to 2023.

=== Board Co-Chairs ===
- Chan Heng Chee
- John L. Thornton

=== Past Presidents ===
- Phillips Talbot 1970–1982
- Robert Oxnam 1982–1992
- Vishakha N. Desai 2004–2012
- Josette Sheeran, 2013–2021
- Kevin Rudd, 2021–2023
- Kyung-wha Kang, 2024–2025

== Functions ==
=== Business ===
From 1998 to 2010, the Asia Society annually presented a Corporate Conference in Asia, which functioned as a fundraiser, to examine the implications of macroeconomic trends and geopolitical developments for the region and the world. Heads of Asian governments were often featured, as well as roundtable discussions with business and policy leaders from around the world.

=== Education ===
The Asia Society's Education department has two primary objectives: one focusing on teaching and learning about Asia in the United States and the other on the expansion of US investments in international studies at the elementary and secondary school levels.

=== Policy ===
The Asia Society houses two policy institutions. The Asia Society Policy Institute (ASPI), founded in 2014, is a think tank that works with policy-makers and experts in Asia.

The Center on U.S.-China Relations was established in 2006 with a gift from Arthur Ross with the goal of helping to forge a more constructive bilateral relationship. The Center undertakes projects and events which explore areas of common interest and divergent views between the two countries, focusing on policy, culture, business, media, economics, energy and the environment. Orville Schell is the current director of the center.

In 2018 the Center on U.S.-China Relations co-produced a report with the Hoover Institution, Chinese Influence & American Interests: Promoting Constructive Vigilance, which examined Chinese influence efforts across American institutions and called for what its authors termed constructive vigilance. The report was the subject of a panel discussion at Stanford University in February 2019.

=== Partnerships ===
In May 2020, during the COVID-19 pandemic, the Asia Society partnered with the nonprofit organization East Coast Coalition for Tolerance and Non-Discrimination and the Rockefeller Foundation to host a virtual forum entitled Standing Against Racism in the Time of COVID. Speakers at the forum included Representative Ted Lieu, then-Los Angeles Mayor Eric Garcetti, community organizer Bincheng Mao, and actor Tzi Ma. The Asia Society maintains a strategic partnership with the Chinese People's Association for Friendship with Foreign Countries.

== Controversy ==
=== Blocking pro-democracy activist from attending event ===
Pro-democracy activist and secretary-general of Demosisto Joshua Wong was allegedly disallowed by Asia Society Hong Kong from speaking at a book launch originally scheduled to take place at its Hong Kong venue on June 28, 2017. Asia Society Hong Kong was approached by PEN Hong Kong to co-curate the book launch, but negotiations stalled upon the former's request for a more diverse panel of speakers. PEN Hong Kong, a nonprofit organization supporting literature and freedom of expression, eventually decided to relocate the launch of Hong Kong 20/20: Reflections on a Borrowed Place – of which Wong was one of the authors – to the Foreign Correspondents Club. Joshua Wong said that Asia Society Hong Kong needs to give a "reasonable explanation" for the incident.

"The mission of PEN Hong Kong is to promote literature and defend the freedom of expression. To bar one of the contributors to our anthology, whether it is Joshua Wong or somebody else, from speaking at our launch event would undermine and in fact contravene that mission," said PEN Hong Kong President Jason Y. Ng.

Back to November 2016, Asia Society Hong Kong also canceled a scheduled screening of Raise The Umbrellas, a documentary on the 2014 Occupy protests with appearance of Joshua Wong. Asia Society Hong Kong has similarly cited the lack of balanced speaker representation at the pre-screening talk as the reason for not screening the film.

US Congressman Chris Smith, co-chairperson of the Congressional-Executive Commission on China, expressed that "The Asia Society has some explaining to do after two events that featured Joshua Wong prominently were canceled over the past nine months," said the New Jersey representative. "I commend PEN Hong Kong for not appeasing the Asia Society's demands."

On July 7, 2017, Asia Society Hong Kong released a statement attributing the decision to an error in judgment at staff level. Asia Society Hong Kong emphasized they received no representations from the Chinese government on this matter, and Joshua Wong and speakers from all sides of the issue were welcome at Asia Society.

On July 10, 2017, Forbes magazine ran an article revealing Hong Kong real estate magnate and Asia Society Co-chair Ronnie Chan (a US citizen) to be the political force behind the Joshua Wong incident. It alleged that wealthy Asians have been behind US think tanks and NGOs and effectively turning them into foreign policy tools of the People's Republic of China (Beijing). However, the link to the article went dead a day later. It has been rumored that Asia Society or Ronnie Chan could be taking legal action against Forbes for libel.

On July 20, 2017, Asia Society Chairman Ronnie Chan defended the Hong Kong center's apolitical stance at an event in New York. He reiterated the Hong Kong center's deliberate stance to stay away from local politics and to cover business and policy, education, arts and culture as an institution. "At Asia Society, we generate not heat but light," he said.

On August 4, 2017, Hong Kong international affairs commentator and newspaper columnist Simon Shen wrote in support of Asia Society Hong Kong's apolitical stance and described it as a "firewall" between international relations and local politics. He pointed to the increasingly blinkered outlook of the local political discourse and argued for the need served by Asia Society to bring a broader perspective for understanding the role of Hong Kong in a global context.

== See also ==
- Japan Society (Manhattan)
- The Korea Society
