= Vishakha N. Desai =

American scholar specialized in Asian history

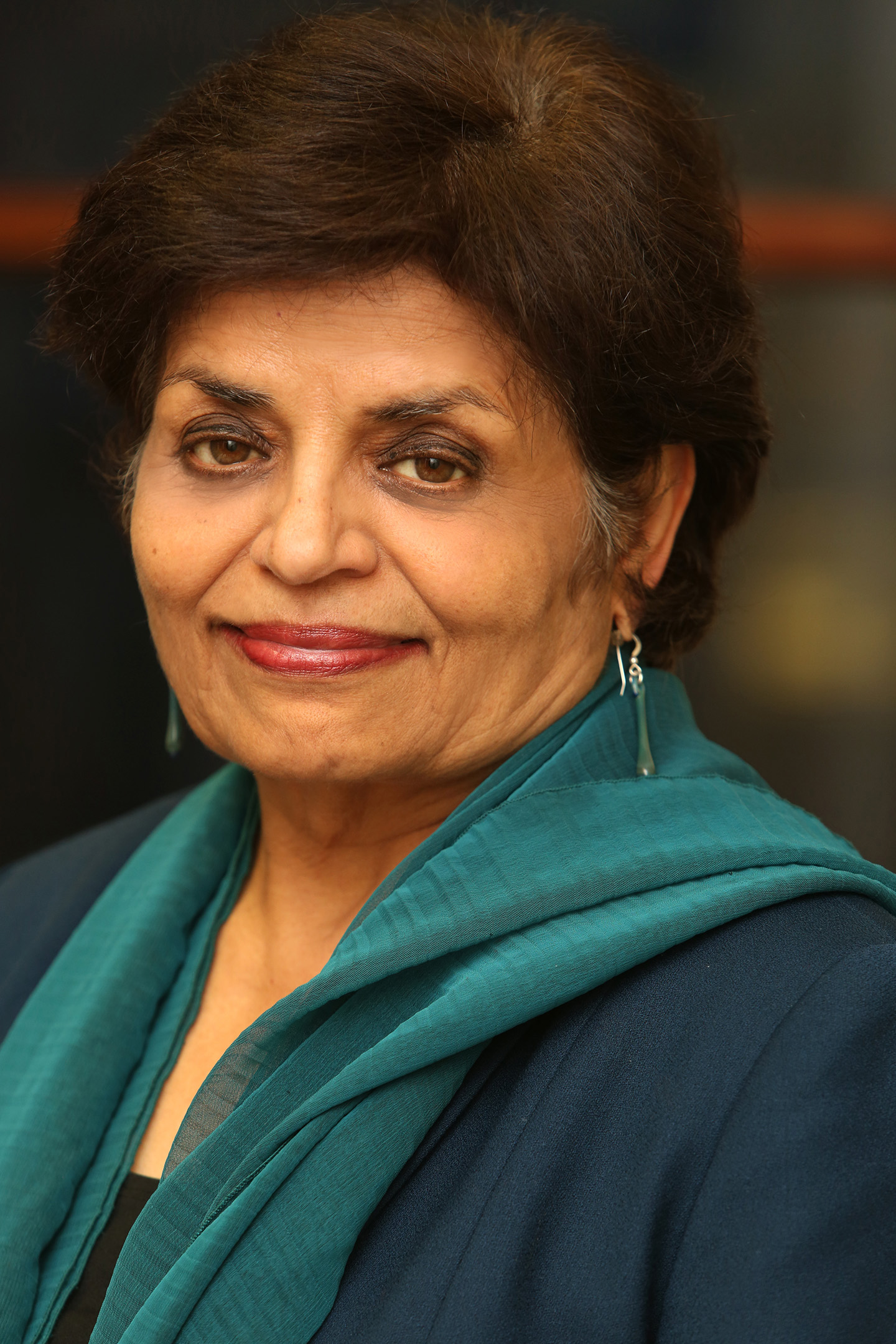
- Born: Vishakha Nirubhai Desai; 1 May 1949 (age 77); Ahmedabad, Gujarat, India
- Title: Senior Advisor to Columbia Global Columbia University
- Spouse: Dr. Robert B. Oxnam

Vishakha N. Desai is a scholar, teacher and institutional leader, with expertise in Asian art and culture and its connection to contemporary issues. She currently serves as Senior Advisor to Columbia Global and Senior Fellow in Global Thought at the Committee on Global Thought at Columbia University, where for over a decade, she has been Senior Advisor for Global Affairs to the President of the university, Senior Research Scholar in Global Studies at its School of International and Public Affairs and Chair of the Committee on Global Thought. She was president emerita of the Asia Society (2004–2012). In recognition of her leadership in the museum field, President Barack Obama appointed her to serve on the National Commission on Museums and Libraries in 2012. Desai has been recognized as one of the "Most Powerful Women in New York" by Crains Magazine, and for her Distinguished Service to the Visual Arts by ArtTable. A recipient of numerous awards, she has received five honorary degrees, from Centre College, Pace University, the College of Staten Island, Susquehanna University, and Williams College.

== Life and career ==
Desai is Senior Advisor to Columbia Global Columbia University and senior Fellow at the University’s Committee on Global thought. She has served as Senior Advisor for Global Affairs to the President of Columbia (2013-2023), as Chair of Committee on Global Thought, and as senior research scholar in global studies at the School of International and Public Affairs.

Desai served as president and CEO of the Asia Society, a global organization dedicated to strengthening partnerships among peoples of Asia and the U.S. from 2004 through 2012. As president, she set the direction for the society's diverse sets of programs ranging from policy initiatives and national educational programs to ground breaking exhibitions and performing arts programs throughout its network of eleven offices in the U.S. and Asia. Under her leadership the society expanded the scope and scale of its activities with the opening of new offices in India and Korea, a new center of U.S.–China Relations, various leadership initiatives, and inauguration of two new architecturally distinguished facilities in Hong Kong and Houston. Prior to becoming president, Desai held various senior positions at the Asia Society from 1990 to 2004, including as the Director of its museum and as Senor Vice President of arts and Culture.

Before joining the Asia Society in 1990, Desai was at the Museum of Fine Arts, Boston as a curator and the head of public programs and academic affairs. She has taught at Columbia University, Boston University, and the University of Massachusetts where she was given a tenured appointment. A Scholar of Asian Art and a public intellectual, Desai is a frequent speaker at international forums on subjects focusing on cultural roots of Asia's economic and political transformation and challenges. She has authored opinion pieces on political, cultural, and women's development in Asia that have appeared in more than fifty publications around the world. Author of major exhibition catalogues and editor of a major scholarly publication on Asian Art History for the 21st Century, Desai is internationally recognized for her leadership in presenting contemporary Asian Art to western audiences.

Desai served as a trustee of the Doris Duke Charitable Foundation, Tallberg Foundation, and serves on the board of KREA University in India. She has been a member of the board of directors of Mahindra and Mahindra, one of the largest multi-national corporation in India, and Teach For All, a global network of 45 independent, locally led and funded partner organizations whose stated shared mission is to expand educational opportunity around the world by increasing and accelerating the impact of social enterprises that are cultivating the leadership necessary for change. She has served as chair of the board of trustees for AFS Intercultural Programs and trustee of the Brookings Institution as well as the Mayor's Commission for Cultural Affairs in New York City, the international advisory committee for the House of World Cultures, Berlin, and for the Auroville Foundation. She served as president of the Association of Art Museum Directors (AAMD) from 1998 to 1999 and on the board from 1995 to 2000. She has served on the board of the Andy Warhol Foundation for Visual Arts, College Art Association, ArtTable, and the Massachusetts Foundation for the Humanities.

The recipient of numerous international and national grants and fellowships, Desai has received five honorary degrees from American Universities and colleges. For her work on Asian American issues, she has received awards from the University of Massachusetts, City University of New York, Asian Americans for Equality, and Leadership Education for Asian Pacific Americans (LEAP). For her leadership in the arts, she has been honored by ArtTable, a national organization of women leaders in the arts, and has received a Gold Medal from the National Institute of Social Sciences. Desai was selected by Crain's New York as one of the “100 most powerful women leaders” in New York, by India Abroad, the leading national weekly for Indian Americans, as one of the “50 most distinguished Indian Americans,” and was honored by Zee T.V. (India) as the outstanding International Woman of the Year.

Desai holds a B.A. in political science from Bombay University and an M.A. and Ph.D. in Asian art history from the University of Michigan.

Desai was married to Robert Oxnam, a China scholar, who was Asia Society's president from 1981 to 1992.

== Bibliography ==
=== Books ===
- Politics of Visual Arts in a Changing World, 2014-2024, Editor, Columbia University Press, 2026.
- World As Family: A Journey of Multi-Rooted Belongings, Author, Columbia University Press, 2021.
- Asian Art History in the 21st Century, Editor, Yale University Press, 2008.
- A Passion for Asia: The Rockefeller Legacy. Editor, Exhibition Catalogue, Asia Society Museum, 2006.
- Conversations with Traditions: Nilima Sheikh – Shahzia Sikander. Exhibition catalogue, Asia Society Museum, 2002.
- Gods, Guardians and Lovers: Temple Sculptures from North India, A.D. 700-1200. Co-Editor and Author, exhibition catalogue, New York: Asia Society in association with Mapin Publishing, 1993.
- Faces of Asia: Portraits from the Permanent Collection. Co-author, Boston: Museum of Fine Arts, Boston, 1989.
- Life at Court: Art for India’s Rulers, 16th-19th Centuries. Exhibition catalogue, Boston: Museum of Fine Arts, Boston, 1985.

=== Select op-eds ===
- "Whose heritage is it anyway?" Frontline, The Hindu, 24 March 2026.
- "Charting a new path in the age of restitution" Frontline, The Hindu, 03 February 2026.
- "Kamala Devi Harris: A Third Generation Feminist, Indian Style" Asia Society Magazine, 20 September 2024.
- "What the Coconut Tree meme says about Kamala Harris' Indian heritage" Nikkei Asia, 30 July 2024.
- "The world is globalizing whether Donald Trump likes it or not—and we must learn to navigate it," QUARTZ, 31 October 2017.
- "The Mahatma in Manhattan" The Hindu, 13 August 2016
- "Who Owns Art?" The Hindu, 13 March 2016
- “India’s Deafening Silence on Stolen Art,” The Hindu, 11 April 2015.
- “Miss America or Miss 7/11,” Huffington Post, 23 September 2013.
- “Missing India in Venice,” The Indian Express, 7 June 2013.
- “North Korea’s Surprising Sense of Vulnerability and Hopes for Change,” Huffington Post, 21 December 2011.
- “Asia Needs More Women Leaders,” Huffington Post, 1 April 2011.
- “President Obama in India,” Huffington Post, 3 November 2010.
- “Overcoming the Bamboo Ceiling,” Huffington Post, 21 July 2010.
- “Asia and America – Two Tracks, One Future,” Huffington Post, 27 January 2010.
- “Women Leaders and the Asia-Pacific Century,” The Business Times (Singapore), 2010.
- “Asia Matters,” Project Syndicate, 2008.
- “China’s Dilemma: Balancing the Individual and the Collectivity,” South Morning China Post, 2008.
- “A New Tang Dynasty,” Daily Times, 15 August 2008.

=== Select articles ===
- “Collecting Contemporary Asian Art: Strategies for the New Century” in Collecting the New, (ed. Bruce Altshuler), Princeton University Press, 2007.
- Exhibiting Cultures or Art? Global/Local: Issues in Presentations of Contemporary Asian Art, Guangzhou Triennial Symposium volume, 2004.
- “Shringara, Viraha and the Rasikapriya,” Ananda Krishna Felicitation volume, 2003.
- “Loves of Radha in the Rasikapriya Verses and Paintings,” Arts Orientalis, 2000.
- “East in the West: Presentations of Contemporary Asian Art in the U.S.,” Japan Foundation Symposium “Asian Contemporary Art Reconsidered,” 1997.
- “Beyond Borders: Presenting Contemporary Asian art in the West,” in a Symposium volume on Chinese Art in the 20th Century, Hong Kong Museum of Art, 1997.
- “Reorienting Ourselves to Asian Art,” ARTnews, 1996.
- “Re-Visioning Asian Art in the 1990s: Reflections of a Museum Professional” Art Bulletin, June 1995, pp. 169–174.
- “Timeless Symbols: Royal Portraits from Rajasthan, 17th-19th Centuries” in The Idea of Rajasthan: History and Culture, Riverdale, MD: Riverdale Press and New Delhi: Manohar, 1994.
- “From Illustrations to Icons: The Changing Context of the Rasikapriya Paintings in Mewar,” in New Studies in Indian Paintings in Honor of Karl Khandalavala, Ahmedabad: Mapin International, December 1994.
- “Whither Home? The Predicament of a Bicultural Existence,” in Asia/America: Identities in Contemporary Asian American Art, exhibition catalogue, New York: The Asia Society in association with The New Press, 1994.
- “Painting and Politics and Seventeenth Century India: Mewar and Bikaner in the Mughal World,” Art Journal, New Approaches to Indian Art, 1990.
- “The Sidhu Collection,” The India Magazine, December 1988, pp. 26–35.
- “On Defining Authenticity and Excellence in Narrative Paintings from Rajasthan,” in The Real, the Fake and the Masterpiece, New York: The Asia Society, 1988, pp. 25–35.
- Asiatic Art in the Museum of Fine Arts, Boston. Sections on Indian, Southeast Asian and Islamic Art, Boston: Museum of Fine Arts, Boston, 1985.
- “Ananda K. Coomaraswamy, Boston and Indian Art in the U.S.” India, June 1982.
- Contributor, Through Closed Doors: Western Influence on Japanese Art, 1939–1853. Exhibition catalogue, Ann Arbor: Meadow Brook Art Gallery and the University of Michigan Museum of Art, 1977.
