= Tim Daggett =

American gymnast (born 1962)

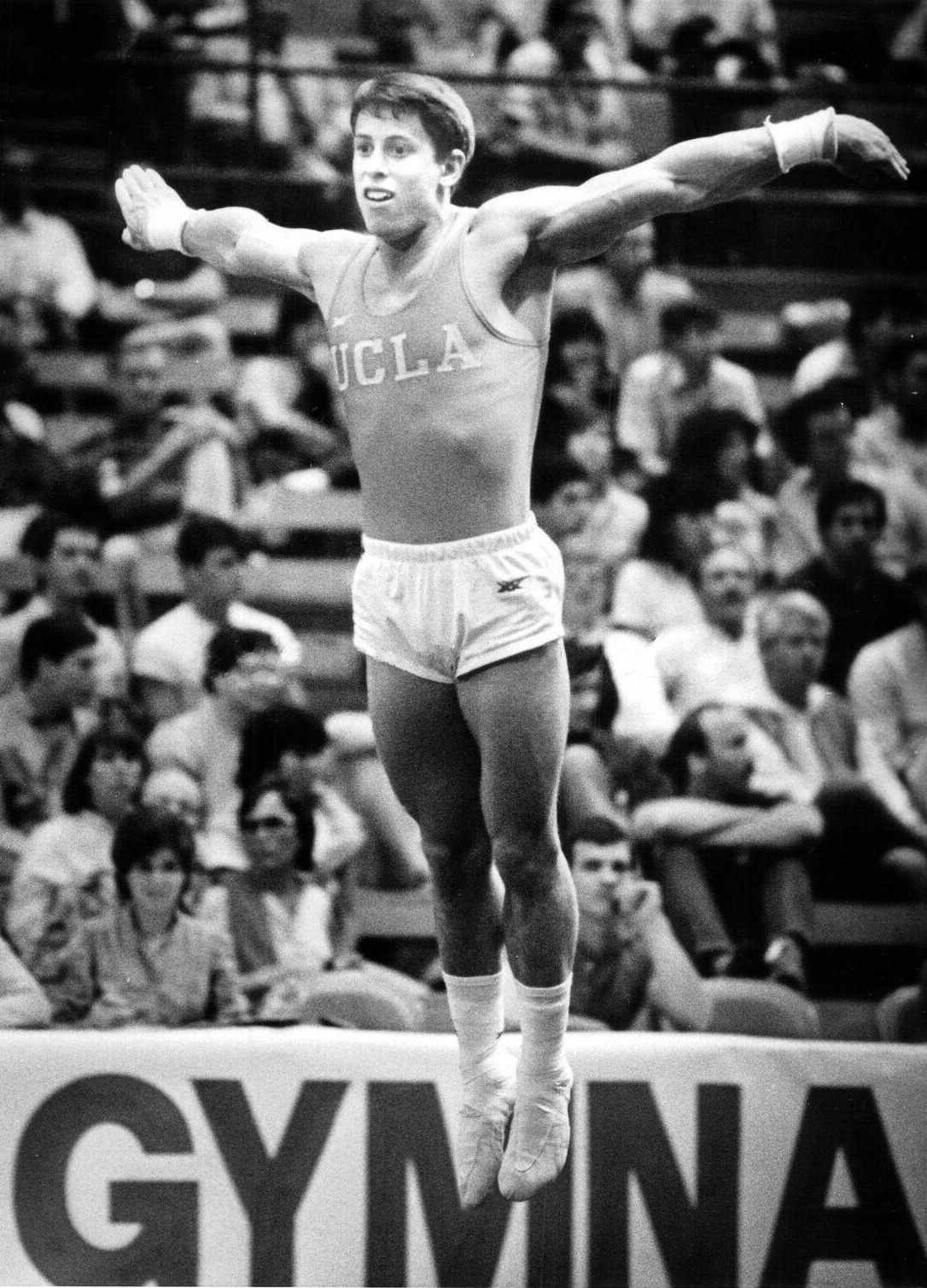
- Daggett in 1984

Personal information
- Full name: Timothy Patrick Daggett
- Born: May 22, 1962 (age 64) Springfield, Massachusetts, U.S.
- Height: 165 cm (5 ft 5 in)

Gymnastics career
- Discipline: Men's artistic gymnastics
- Country represented: United States
- College team: UCLA Bruins
- Head coach: Art Shurlock
- Assistant coach: Makoto Sakamoto
- Eponymous skills: Daggett (pommel horse)
- Retired: 1988
Medal record
Men's artistic gymnastics
Representing United States
| Event | 1st | 2nd | 3rd |
|---|---|---|---|
| Olympic Games | 1 | 0 | 1 |
| Pan American Games | 2 | 0 | 1 |
| Total | 3 | 0 | 2 |
Olympic Games
| Gold medal – first place | 1984 Los Angeles | Team |
| Bronze medal – third place | 1984 Los Angeles | Pommel horse |
Pan American Games
| Gold medal – first place | 1987 Indianapolis | Team |
| Gold medal – first place | 1987 Indianapolis | Pommel horse |
| Bronze medal – third place | 1987 Indianapolis | All-around |

Timothy Patrick Daggett (born May 22, 1962) is an American former gymnast and an Olympic gold medalist. He is a graduate of West Springfield High School and UCLA, who competed in the 1984 Los Angeles Olympics, along with Bart Conner, Peter Vidmar and Mitch Gaylord. There, Daggett scored a perfect 10 on the horizontal bar, assisting his team in winning a gold medal – the first for the U.S. men's gymnastics team in Olympic history. In addition to team gold, he earned an individual bronze medal on the pommel horse. In 2005, he was inducted into the United States Olympic Hall of Fame.

== Personal life ==
In West Springfield, Massachusetts, at the age of 10, Daggett began his future career in gymnastics by enrolling in the Parks and Recreation program. Advancing quickly, Daggett was invited by the local high school coach to train with his team. While he was a college student at UCLA, he competed in NCAA Division I gymnastics. He graduated from UCLA in 1986 with a degree in psychology.

Daggett is married to Deanne (née Lazer), formerly a collegiate-level gymnast at Eastern Michigan University and now an M.D. practicing anesthesiology. Their children are Peter and Carlie Daggett. Tim named his son Peter after teammate Peter Vidmar. Peter's son Tim is named after Tim Daggett. They all currently live in East Longmeadow, Massachusetts.

== Medical history ==
Daggett's ankles had historically been weak. In 1980, Daggett dislocated one ankle shortly after having the other rebuilt. For months in 1986, he was forced to recover from his two ankles again being rebuilt. Immediately following the recovery during training, his horizontal bar release ended with him landing on his neck. The result was a ruptured spinal disc, and his left arm nerves were also damaged.

Daggett, against doctor recommendations, ignored the proposed surgery, which would have ended his career, and caught mononucleosis following his recovery from the near-fatal landing. At the 1987 World Championships in Rotterdam, he was severely injured. On the vault, he snapped his tibia and fibula and severed one of his arteries following the impact from a pike Cuervo, which consists of a handspring followed by a half twist and a piked flip backward. He was treated at the Academia Hospital in Rotterdam, and two weeks later was flown to the UCLA Medical Center in the United States for additional surgery, including skin grafts and removing supportive braces and pins to his left leg. He was under sedation from morphine in hospitals for three months.

== Post-retirement career ==
Since retiring from competitive gymnastics after the 1988 Summer Olympics in Seoul, Daggett has become a prominent television commentator, serving as the primary commentator for NBC's gymnastics coverage at the Olympic Games in Barcelona, Atlanta, Sydney, Athens, Beijing, London, Rio, Tokyo, and Paris. He has provided expert analysis alongside Elfi Schlegel, Al Trautwig, John Tesh, Nastia Liukin, John Roethlisberger, Amanda Borden, and Andrea Joyce.

In addition to his broadcasting career, in 1990, Daggett founded Daggett Gold Medal Gymnastics, a gymnastics facility in Agawam, Massachusetts, which offered a range of programs for both recreational and competitive gymnasts. The facility featured Boys and Girls Team Programs, as well as classes for toddlers and young children. It also hosted open gym sessions for the public and offered a martial arts class. Daggett coached the competitive Boys Junior Olympic Team Program and helped develop multiple gymnasts who have achieved national championship titles and earned spots on national teams. As of 2022, the gymnastics facility is now called Western Mass Gymnastics.

Additionally, Daggett organized and hosted the Tim Daggett National Invitational (TDNI), an annual gymnastics competition held every January at the Springfield MassMutual Center.This prestigious event attracted gymnasts from across the country to compete at a high level, showcasing emerging talent in the sport.

== Eponymous skills ==
Daggett had one named element on the pommel horse, originally named in 1989, but removed from the code of points in 2000.

Gymnastics elements named after Tim Daggett
| Apparatus | Name | Description | Difficulty | Added to Code of Points |
|---|---|---|---|---|
| Pommel horse | Conner | "Scissor bw. with 1/2 counter turn" | Removed from CoP on December 31, 2000. | 1989 |

== Gymnastics record ==
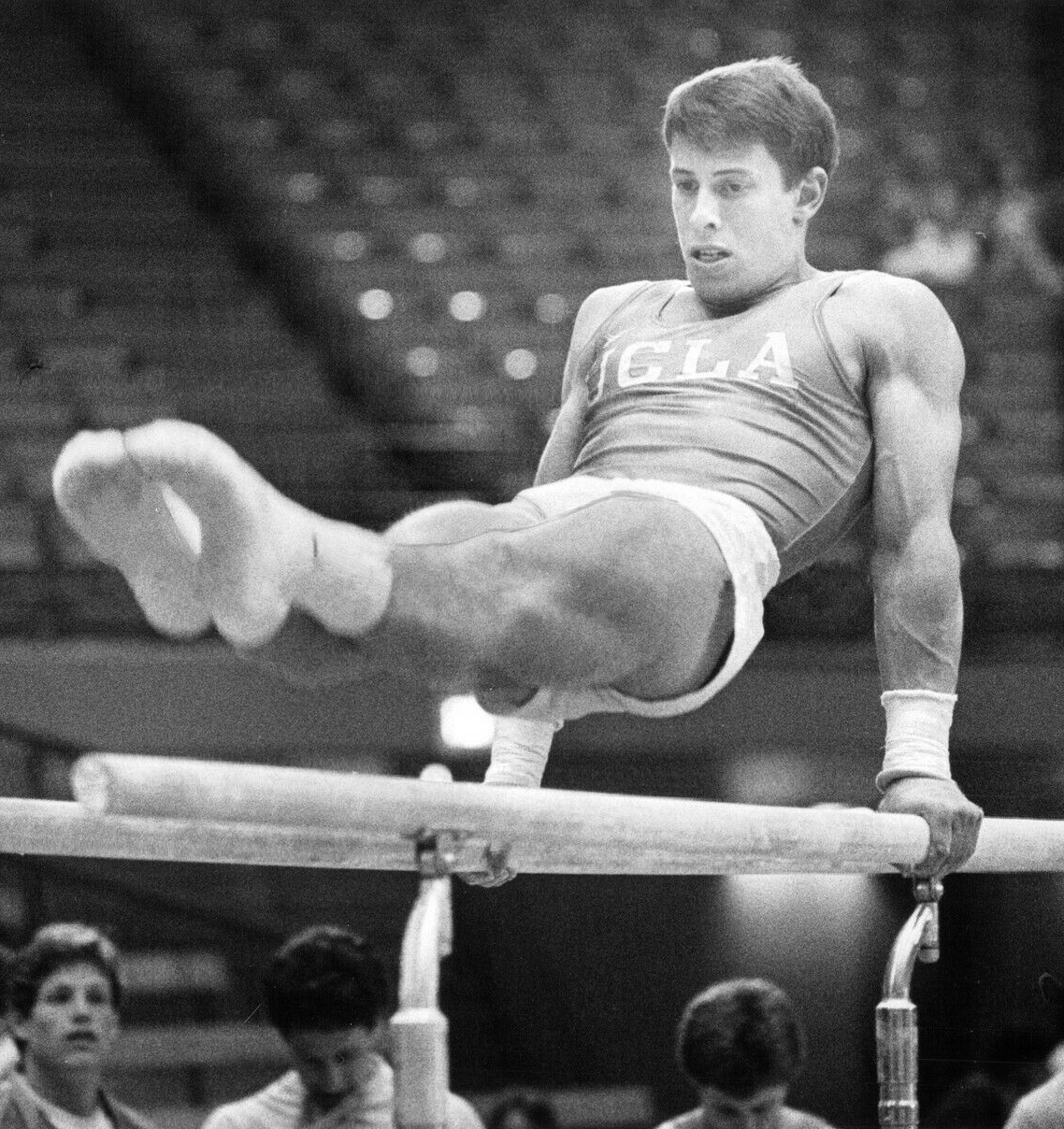
Daggett in 1984

=== U.S. Nationals ===
- 1981 — 12th AA
- 1982 — 4th AA, 5th PH, 6th RG (tie), 6th PB,
- 1983 — 5th AA, 1st PH, 2nd HB
- 1984 — 4th AA, 5th FX, 1st PH, 2nd RG (tie), 1st PB (tie), 1st HB (tie)
- 1985 — 3rd AA, 2nd PH, 1st PB, 3rd FX
- 1986 — 1st AA, 6th PH, 3rd RG, 3rd V, 1st PB, 4th HB
- 1988 — 43rd AA (withdrew due to injury), 5th PH

=== U.S. Olympic trials ===
- 1984 — 3rd AA
- 1988 — 23rd AA (withdrew due to injury)

=== World Championships ===
- 1983 — 4th Team
- 1985 — 9th Team, 25th AA
- 1987 — 9th Team (During the vault, Daggett suffered shattered bones in his left leg in an unfortunate landing)

=== Olympics ===
- 1984 — 1st Team, 3rd PH, 4th HB (tie)
