= Robert Oxnam =

American scholar (1942–2024)

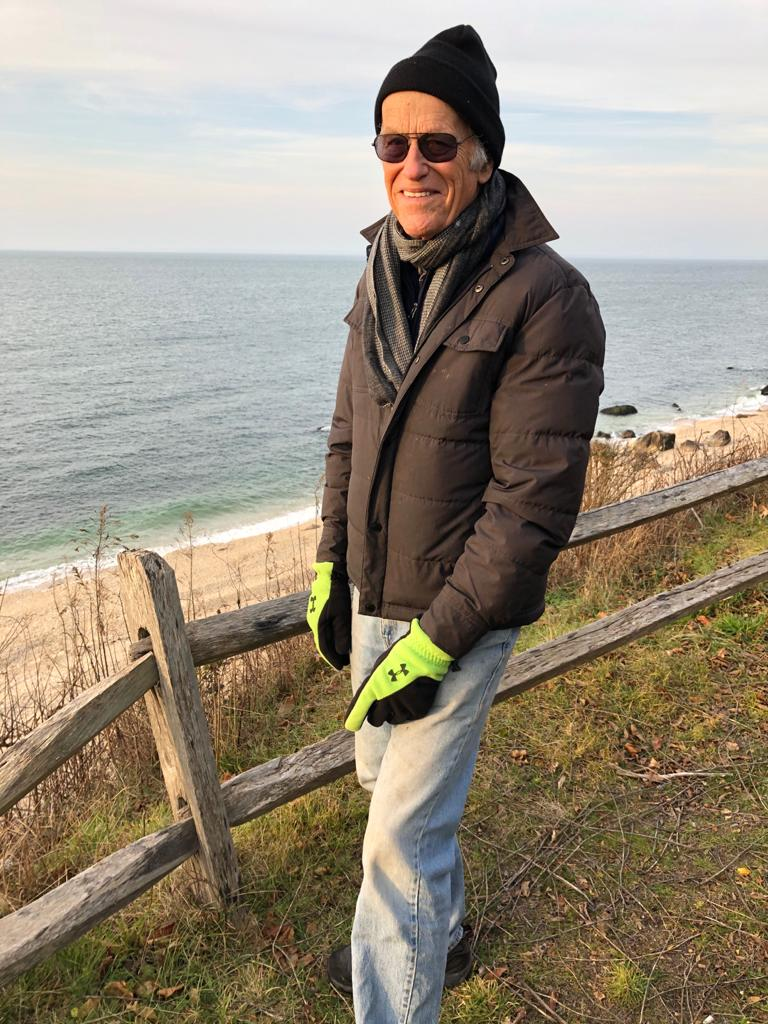
- Born: December 14, 1942; Los Angeles, California, U.S.
- Died: April 18, 2024 (aged 81); Greenport, Suffolk County, New York, U.S.
- Education: Williams College; Yale University
- Title: President of the Asia Society
- Spouse: Vishakha N. Desai (m. 1993)
- Website: www.robertoxnam.com

Robert Bromley Oxnam (December 14, 1942 – April 18, 2024) was an American China scholar who was President of the Asia Society New York. He ran the society for more than a decade, and led financial-cultural tours of China for Bill Gates, Warren Buffett, and former U.S. President George H. W. Bush. He became well known in the public media after his 2005 autobiography, A Fractured Mind, in which he revealed that he had been diagnosed with dissociative identity disorder.

== Early life and education ==
Oxnam was born on December 14, 1942, in Los Angeles, California. He was educated at Williams College (B.A. 1964, Phi Beta Kappa) and Yale University (M.A. 1966, Ph.D., 1969). He taught at Trinity College (Connecticut) (1969–75), Columbia University (1990s), and Williams College (Bernhard Professorship, 1995). His academic honors have included the Williams College Bicentennial Medal (1993) and the Trinity College LL.D. (1994). He served as a member of the visiting committee of Drew University and American University's School of International Service.

== Career ==
Oxnam was President of The Asia Society for over a decade (1981–92). The Asia Society, America's leading public education institution on all aspects of the Asia/Pacific region, grew rapidly under his direction to encompass corporate, contemporary, and cultural programs concerning over thirty Asian countries, with a New York headquarters and offices in Washington D.C., Los Angeles, Houston, and Hong Kong. Prior to his presidency, he served as the Society's Vice President and Washington D.C. Center Director (1979–81) and as China Council Director (1975–81).

From the 1990s, Oxnam often acted as a lecturer for prominent Americans seeking in-depth knowledge of China, including Bill Gates (Microsoft) and Warren Buffett (Berkshire Hathaway) and former President George H. W. Bush and Mrs. Barbara Bush. He was Senior Advisor to the Atlanta-based Society of International Business Fellows and often accompanied their business leaders to various parts of Asia. For a short time he was also Special Correspondent for the MacNeil/Lehrer NewsHour, hosting an acclaimed nine-part special on China.

Oxnam was the author of two novels (both from St. Martin's Press): Cinnabar (1990 - a mystery thriller on 20th century China) and Ming (1995 - a historical novel about 17th century China). He also authored or edited several non-fiction works on Asia: Ruling from Horseback (on the Manchu conquest of China); Dragon and Eagle (a comprehensive review of U.S.-China relations); several editions of China Briefing (annual review designed for businesspeople, journalists, and academics). He contributed articles to The New York Times, Foreign Affairs, and The Asian Wall Street Journal.

In 2005, he published his unusual memoir: A Fractured Mind (Hyperion Press). The book elicited widespread media coverage including CBS's 60 Minutes, ABC's Good Morning America, NBC Today Show, PBS, The New York Times, Time Magazine, Daily Telegraph, and the BBC.

In 2003–06, he was Visiting Professor at Beijing University and Global Scholar at Robinson College of Business Georgia State University. He was a member of the Council on Foreign Relations, Cosmos Club, Century Association, the Association of Asian Studies, and the National Committee on U.S.-China Relations. In later years, he was advisor to major wealth management firms including, the Bessemer Trust Company, as well as trustee of the Rockefeller Brothers Fund and the Armand Erpf Fund, offering insights on the Asia/Pacific region.

In later years, Oxnam embarked on an artistic career — making weathered wood sculptures and doing macro-lens photography of glacial rocks — in the great tradition of Chinese scholar's rocks. In recent years, exhibitions have included: Chambers Fine Art Gallery, Rockefeller Brothers Fund, Triple Candie Gallery, Interchurch Center, Brecknock Hall, Full Moon Arts Center, Art Sites Gallery. In addition to being a frequent speaker on topics concerning China and Asia, Oxnam gave keynote addresses on the "Psychology of Creativity" to such organizations as An Infinite Mind and the Conductors Retreat at Medomak.

In 2011, world-famous Chinese contemporary artist Cai Guoqiang said of Oxnam's artwork:

Looking at Robert's work, I was very touched, and glad to see the artistry and youth in each individual piece. Using weathered wood and tree roots as his main medium, Robert's art largely relies on the magic and strangeness of natural found objects. He begins with a good eye and fine artisanship, but then he goes further, bringing out the hidden beauty or ugliness in each piece. In the process, the artistry becomes evident and the works become charismatic.

In 2014, he was one of two hundred leading American artists asked to create a work for the highly successful Fabergè Big Egg Hunt New York and continued to expand his talent.

== Personal life and death ==
Oxnam was married to Vishakha N. Desai, a specialist on Asian art, who stepped down as President of the Asia Society in 2012, and is currently Special Advisor for Global Affairs to the President of Columbia University and Senior Advisor for Global Policy and Programs to the Director of the Solomon R. Guggenheim Foundation.

Oxnam died of complications of Alzheimer's disease in Greenport, Suffolk County, New York, on April 18, 2024. He was 81.

== Bibliography ==
=== Books ===
- A Fractured Mind: My Life with Multiple Personality Disorder. (Author) Hyperion Press, 2005.
- Ming: A Novel of Seventeenth-Century China.(Author) St. Martin's Press, 1995.
- Cinnabar: A Novel of China. (Author) St. Martin's Press, 1990.
- Japan, Korea and China: American Perceptions and Policies. (Co-Author) Lexington Books, D.C. Heath and Company, 1979.
- Dragon and Eagle: United States-China Relations, Past and Future. (Co-Editor) Basic Books, 1978.
- Ruling from Horseback: Manchu Politics in the Oboi Regency, 1661–1669. (Author) University of Chicago Press, 1975.

=== Select articles ===
- "Launching Pad—PhD, Target—TBD", in Perspectives on History: The Newsmagazine of the American Historical Association, October 2014.
- "An Interview with Robert Oxnam", in Orientations: The Magazine for Collectors and Connoisseurs of Asian Art, May 2013.
- "Chinese Scholars Rocks: Traditional Legacies, Modern Inspirations", in Art and Rocks: Nature Found and Made Exhibition Catalogue, Chambers Fine Art, July 2009.
