= Romina Plataroti =

Argentine artistic gymnast (born 1977)

- Full name: Romina Cecilia Plataroti Francisco
- Born: March 9, 1977 (age 49)

Gymnastics career
- Discipline: Women's artistic gymnastics
- Country represented: Argentina
- Retired: Yes
Medal record
Representing Argentina
Women's artistic gymnastics
Pan American Games
Bronze medal – third place	1991 Havana	All-around
Bronze medal – third place	1995 Mar del Plata	Team
Pan American Cup
Gold medal – first place	1989 Victoria	Balance beam
Gold medal – first place	1989 Victoria	Floor exercise
South American Championships
Gold medal – first place	1988 Rosario	Team
Silver medal – second place	1988 Rosario	All-around

Romina Cecilia Plataroti Francisco (born March 9, 1977) is a retired female gymnast from Argentina, who competed for her native South American country at the 1992 Summer Olympics. She won a bronze medal at the 1991 Pan American Games in Havana, Cuba.
