= Brian Ginsberg =

American gymnast (born 1966)

- Full name: Brian Ginsberg
- Born: December 5, 1966 (age 59) Miami, Florida, U.S.
- Height: 5 ft 2 in (157 cm)

Gymnastics career
- Discipline: Men's artistic gymnastics
- Country represented: United States
- College team: UCLA Bruins
- Gym: Empire Eagles
- Head coach: Arthur Shurlock
- Eponymous skills: Ginsberg (parallel bars)
Medal record
Men's artistic gymnastics
Representing United States
Event	1st	2nd	3rd
Pan American Games	1	0	1
Total	1	0	1
Pan American Games
Gold medal – first place	1987 Indianapolis	Team
Bronze medal – third place	1987 Indianapolis	Rings

Brian Ginsberg (born 1966) is an American former gymnast. He is a two-time US junior national gymnastics champion. He was a member of the United States men's national artistic gymnastics team and won two medals at the 1987 Pan American Games.

== Early life and education ==
Ginsberg was born in Miami, Florida, to Nathan (a radiologist) and Iris Ginsberg, is Jewish, and grew up in Denver, Colorado, and Mobile, Alabama. His grandparents are Betty and Sam Diemar.

Ginsberg competed in gymnastics for UCLA, where he majored in kinesiology and was pre-med hoping to specialize in sports medicine.

== Gymnastics career ==
Ginsberg was the 1982 and 1983 United States junior national gymnastics champion. In 1985 he won the all-around competition at the Brazil Cup. Ginsberg also won gold in the rings, silver in the floor exercise, and bronze in the vault individual medals at the National Sports Festival. He competed in the 1985 Maccabiah Games for Team USA.

In 1986 competing for the UCLA Bruins, Ginsberg was an All-American, and finished second in the 1986 NCAA all-around competition. He won the floor exercise in the competition.

In 1987, Ginsberg won the McDonald's American Cup at George Mason University's Patriot Center in Virginia, as Soviet national champion Vladimir Gogoladze came in second. The Alabama State Senate passed a resolution commending him for extraordinary achievement.

Ginsberg won a gold and a bronze medal at the 1987 Pan American Games.

== Eponymous skills ==
Ginsberg had one named element on the parallel bars, originally named in 1989, but removed from the code of points in 2000.

Gymnastics elements named after Brian Ginsberg
Apparatus	Name	Description	Difficulty	Added to Code of Points
Parallel bars	Ginsberg	"Giant swing fw. to hdst."	Removed from CoP on December 31, 2000.	1989
