= Harvard Book Award =

Award for high school students

The Harvard Book Award or Harvard Prize Book is an award given out by the alumni of Harvard University to the top-performing student(s) in 11th/12th grade reading classes in nearly 2,000 "selected" high schools from around the world. The award has been in existence since 1910.

The award is traditionally handed out at graduation ceremonies. Criteria for selection vary by school, and it is usually associated with unmistakable academic excellence, strength of character and achievements in other fields.

Each Book awarded comes with an official Harvard bookplate which states the name of the donor and the award recipient and a commemorative bookmark.

The Harvard Prize Books are usually presented at the end of the academic year at high school award ceremonies or high school graduations.

== See also ==
- Graduation
- Harvard University
