= Progressive Lawyers Group =

Hong Kong pro-democracy civil group

- Founded: 27 January 2015; 11 years ago
- Location: Hong Kong
- Key people: Craig Choy (蔡騏), Billy Li (李安然), Wilson Leung (梁允信), Jonathan Man (文浩正), Chris Ng (吳宗鑾), Kevin Yam (任建峰)
- Website: www.hkplg.org

Progressive Lawyers Group
- Traditional Chinese: 法政匯思
- Simplified Chinese: 法政汇思
Transcriptions
Standard Mandarin
- Hanyu Pinyin: Fázhèng Huìsī
Yue: Cantonese
- Yale Romanization: Faat jing wuih sī
- Jyutping: Faat3 zing3 wui6 si1

The Progressive Lawyers Group (Chinese: 法政匯思), formed on 27 January 2015, is a pro-democracy civil group formed by local barristers, solicitors, law students and citizens holding law degrees. It aims to uphold and promote core values in Hong Kong including rule of law, judicial independence, democracy, human rights and freedom. The group was disbanded in July 2021.

== Formation ==
The group was founded by solicitors Kevin Yam (任建峰), Jonathan Man (文浩正) and barrister Wilson Leung (梁允信), in 2015, after the Occupy Central Movement. It aims to project the voice of local law practitioners, and to uphold pro-democratic values in Hong Kong. The group have since then commented on major Hong Kong political events, such as the Causeway Bay Books disappearances, Copyright (Amendment) Bill 2014, the National Anthem Bill and the 709 crackdown.

== Current status ==
The group currently engages in different local activities, which includes commenting on Hong Kong affairs in legal standpoint, conducting research for policies in Hong Kong in a legal standpoint, organise street stalls to educate and communicate with the public, and to give talks to local schools and universities. The group also raises money for social movements and projects and write articles in both Chinese and English through different media outlets in Hong Kong.
