= Andrea Conway =

Canadian gymnast, acrobat and actor

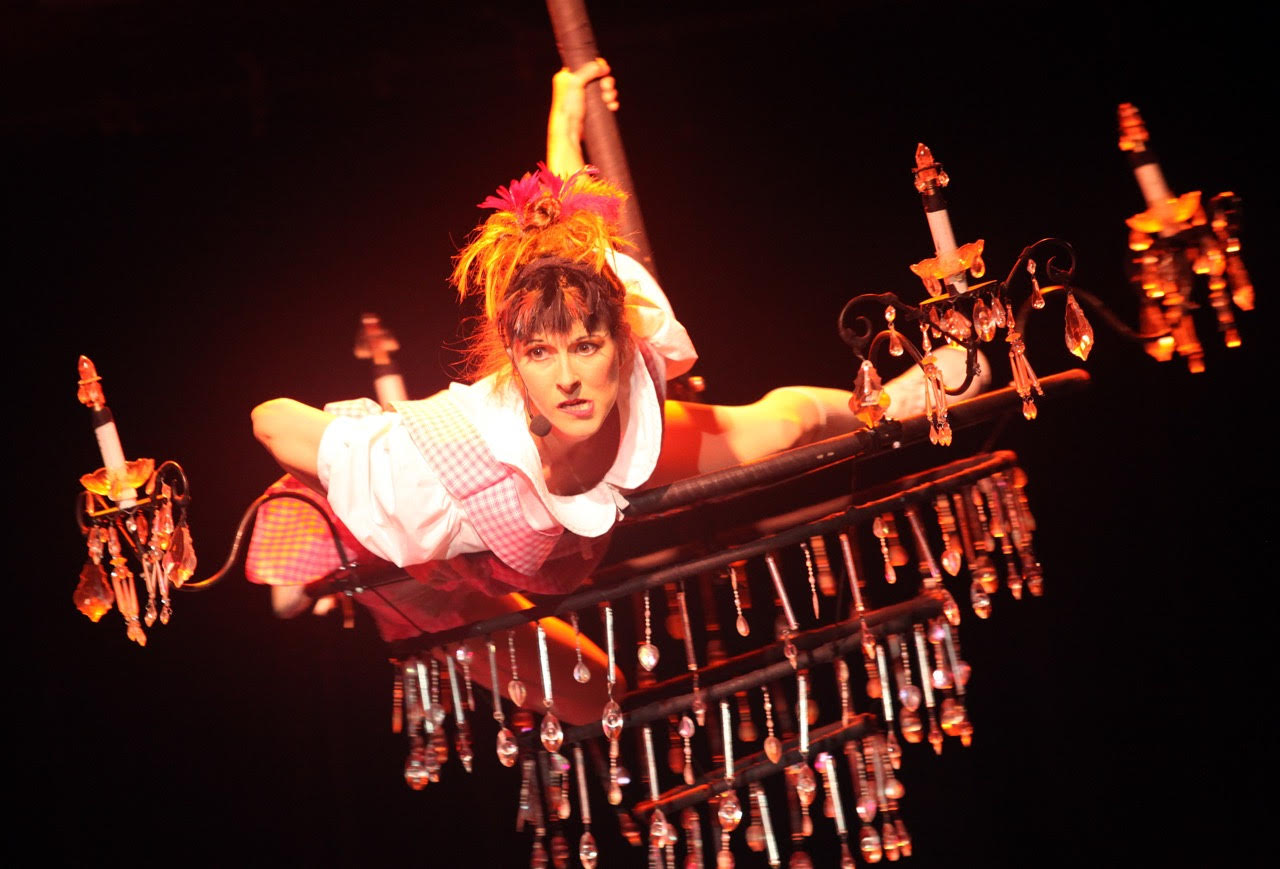
- Andrea Conway performing as “Mitzi"
- Born: September 15, 1971 (age 54); Pointe-Claire, Quebec
- Other names: Andrea Conway-Doba
- Occupations: Gymnast, acrobat, actor, tap dancer, clown

Andrea Conway, also known as Andrea Conway-Doba (born September 15, 1971), is a former Canadian gymnast, acrobat, actor, tap dancer and clown from Pointe-Claire, Quebec.

== Gymnastics ==
Conway competed in artistic gymnastics on a national level, representing Quebec. In 1987, she represented Canada at the Pan American Games in Indianapolis, winning a bronze medal for team Canada.

== Stage career ==
Conway toured with Cirque du Soleil from 1992–2000, performing on the Chinese poles and Russian swing. She was a cast member in Cirque du Soleil's Saltimbanco.

In 2001, she was cast in Teatro Zinzanni. She went on to collaborate in 18 Teatro Zinzanni productions in San Francisco and Seattle. She also co-wrote and co-directed two Teatro Zinzanni productions.

Conway appeared in several Teatro Zinzanni shows with her husband, Wayne Doba, as the tap dancing comedy duo “Dik and Mitzi”. The couple perform two-person shows in small theaters across the U.S. and Canada.

== Personal life ==
Conway went into kidney failure in 2016 and spent two years on dialysis before undergoing a successful kidney transplant from an anonymous donor. She wrote about her experience in Journal Le Tour, a bilingual newspaper in Quebec.
