= 1990 South American Games =

Multi-sport event in Lima, Peru

IV South American Games
- 1990 South American Games logo
- Host city: Lima
- Country: Peru
- Nations: 10
- Athletes: 1,070
- Events: 260 in 16 sports
- Opening: December 1, 1990
- Closing: December 10, 1990
- Opened by: Alberto Fujimori
- Torch lighter: Cecilia Tait
- Main venue: Estadio Nacional del Perú

The IV South American Games (Spanish: Juegos Sudamericanos; Portuguese: Jogos Sul-Americanos) were a multi-sport event held in 1990 in Lima, Peru, with some events in Arequipa (cycling and weightlifting) and Trujillo (artistic gymnastics and taekwondo). The Games were organized by the South American Sports Organization (ODESUR). An appraisal of the games and detailed medal lists were published elsewhere, emphasizing the results of the Argentinian teams.

The games were officially opened by Peruvian president Alberto Fujimori. Torch lighter at the Estadio Nacional del Perú was Olympic silver medalist, volleyball player Cecilia Tait.

Colombia rather preferred to participate at the Central American and Caribbean Games at Ciudad de México taking place almost at the same time, and sent no athletes. Venezuela also preferred to participate at the Central American and Caribbean Games, but sent at least a small contingent of 56 athletes.

== Participants ==
10 ODESUR members participated on the games, Colombia did not participate because preferred to participate the 1990 Central American and Caribbean Games

- Argentina
- Bolivia
- Brazil
- Chile
- Ecuador
- Paraguay
- Peru (Hosts)
- Suriname
- Uruguay
- Venezuela

== Medal count ==
The medal count for these Games is tabulated below. This table is sorted by the number of gold medals earned by each country. The number of silver medals is taken into consideration next, and then the number of bronze medals.

* Host nation (Peru)

Rank	Nation	Gold	Silver	Bronze	Total
1	Argentina (ARG)	68	73	46	187
2	Peru (PER)*	50	59	76	185
3	Chile (CHI)	40	38	60	138
4	Brazil (BRA)	37	21	19	77
5	Venezuela (VEN)	27	22	15	64
6	Ecuador (ECU)	21	23	18	62
7	Uruguay (URU)	13	13	15	41
8	Bolivia (BOL)	2	9	24	35
9	Suriname (SUR)	2	0	1	3
10	Paraguay (PAR)	0	4	2	6
Totals (10 entries)		260	262	276	798

== Sports ==
- Aquatic sports
  - Swimming
- Athletics
- Baseball
- Bowling^{‡}
- Boxing
- Cycling
  - Road Cycling
  - Track Cycling
- Fencing
- Gymnastics
  - Artistic Gymnastics
  - Rhythmic Gymnastics
- Judo^{†}
- Sailing
- Shooting
- Table Tennis
- Taekwondo
- Tennis
- Weightlifting
- Wrestling

=== Notes ===
^{†}: The male judo competition was reserved to junior representatives (U-20).

^{‡}: The bowling competition was reserved to junior representatives (U-20).
