= María Flores-Wurmser =

Guatemalan gymnast (born 1971)

Personal information
- Nationality: Guatemalan
- Born: 28 July 1971 (age 54)

Sport
- Sport: Gymnastics

María Flores-Wurmser (born 28 July 1971) is a Guatemalan gymnast.

She competed in five events at the 1988 Summer Olympics.
