= PEN Hong Kong =

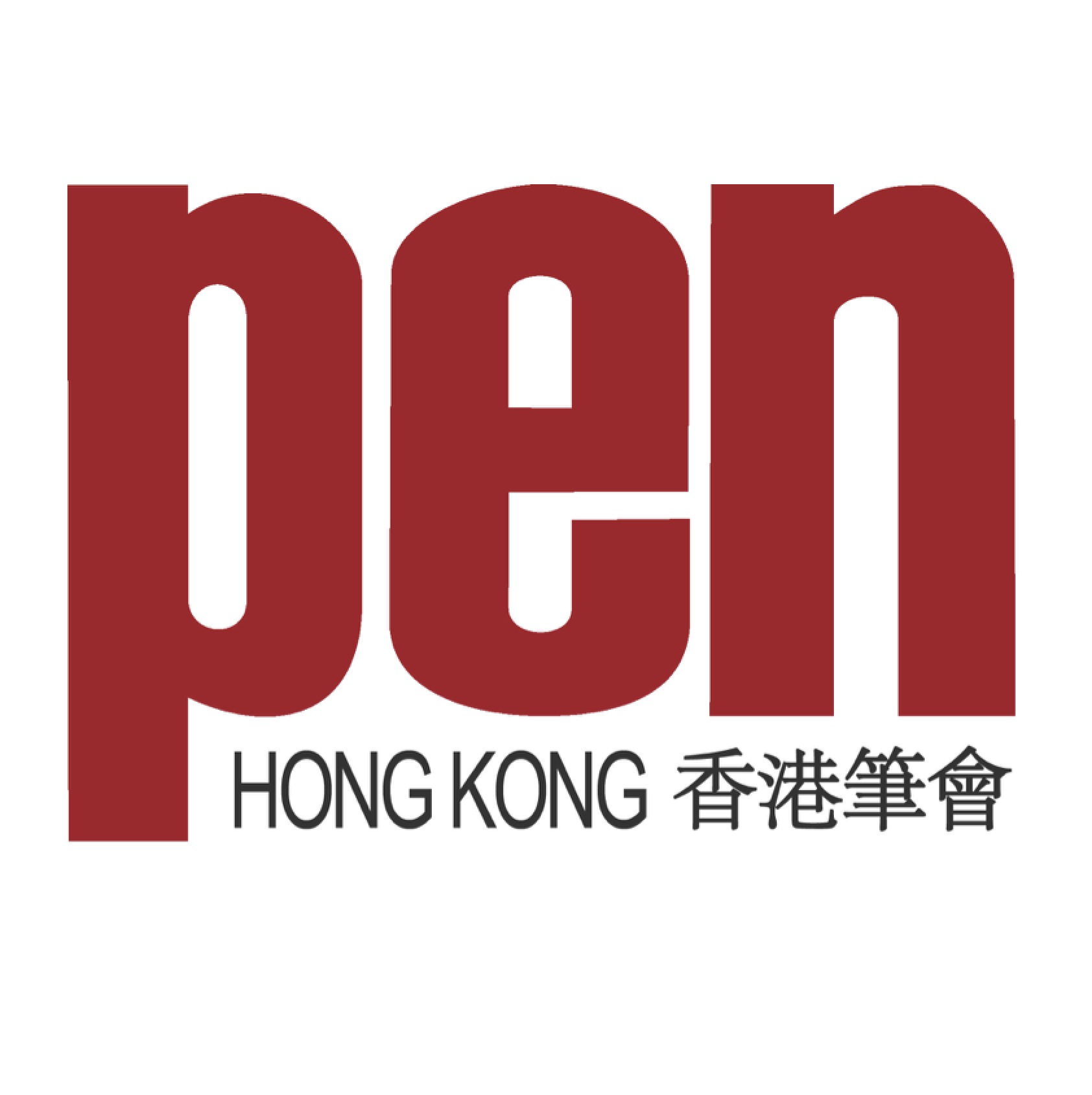
- Formation: 2016
- Type: Literary organization
- Purpose: Promote literature and defend freedom of expression in Hong Kong and the rest of China
- Headquarters: Hong Kong
- Region served: Hong Kong, China
- Official language: English, Chinese
- President: Tammy Lai-Ming Ho
- Key people: Tammy Lai-Ming Ho (president), William Nee (vice president), Ilaria Maria Sala (vice president)
- Parent organization: PEN International
- Website: penhongkong.org (no longer working)

PEN Hong Kong (Chinese: 香港筆會) is one of the 148 centers of PEN International. Founded in 2016, it is a multilingual society of Hong Kong–based writers, poets, publishers, editors, translators, journalists and academics, aimed at promoting literature and defending the freedom of expression in Hong Kong.

The current president of PEN Hong Kong is Tammy Lai-Ming Ho. Other officers include Ilaria Maria Sala (Vice President), William Nee (Vice President) and Edmund Cheng (Secretary).

== History ==
An English-language only PEN Hong Kong Center was founded in the 1980s by a number of Hong Kong–based expatriates. The organization was widely recognized for its work in the 1980s and 1990s providing assistance to writers who were Vietnamese refugees. The center went inactive after key members of the organization left the city.

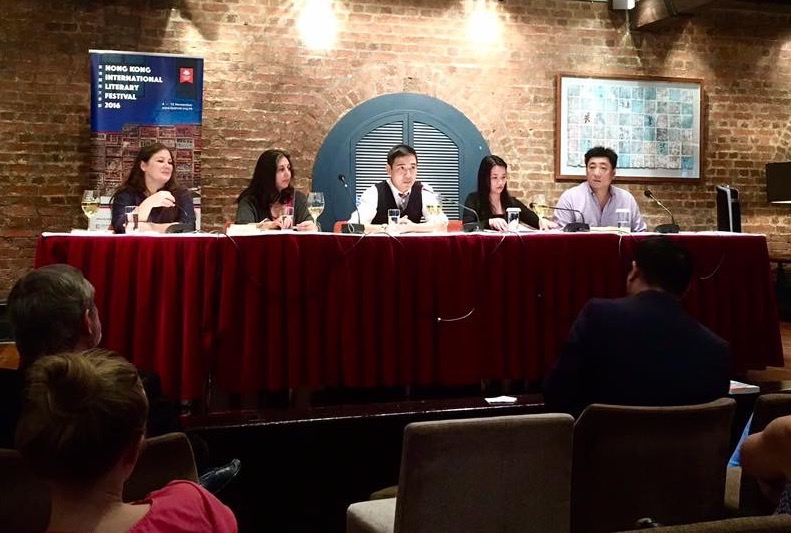
Founding members of PEN Hong Kong spoke at the Foreign Correspondents' Club launch event

In 2016, a number of prominent writers, journalists and academics came together to revive the Hong Kong Center, motivated in large part by the rapid erosion of press freedom, academic freedom, and the freedom of expression in general in Hong Kong. High-profile incidents such as the knife attack on Kevin Lau, the Causeway Bay Books disappearances, the University of Hong Kong pro-vice-chancellor selection controversy have bolstered the need for a bilingual platform to bring together the Chinese language and English language literary circles which for years have been segregated due to the differences in language and readership.

On 13 November 2016, PEN Hong Kong was officially launched at the Foreign Correspondents' Club, Hong Kong in conjunction with the Hong Kong International Literary Festival.

== Mission ==
The mission of PEN Hong Kong is to bring together individuals working in the field of the written word to celebrate and promote literature and creative expression. The organization is focused on defending the freedom of expression in Hong Kong and the rest of China.

== Publication ==
- Hong Kong 20/20 ISBN 978-988-77927-6-5
