= Andrea Giordano =

Argentine gymnast (born 1976)

Personal information
- Nationality: Argentine
- Born: 17 July 1976 (age 48)

Sport
- Sport: Gymnastics

Andrea Giordano (born 17 July 1976) is an Argentine gymnast. She competed in five events at the 1992 Summer Olympics.
