= Marco Monteiro =

Brazilian gymnast (born 1966)

- Born: 23 July 1966 (age 60) Rio de Janeiro, Brazil

Gymnastics career
- Discipline: Men's artistic gymnastics
- Country represented: Brazil

Marco Monteiro (born 23 July 1966) is a Brazilian gymnast. He competed in seven events at the 1992 Summer Olympics.
