= Chile at the Pan American Games =

- IOC code: CHI
- NOC: Comité Olímpico de Chile
- Medals Ranked 9th: Gold 69 Silver 141 Bronze 205 Total 415

Pan American Games appearances (overview)
- 1951; 1955; 1959; 1963; 1967; 1971; 1975; 1979; 1983; 1987; 1991; 1995; 1999; 2003; 2007; 2011; 2015; 2019; 2023

Chile is one of participating countries in the Pan American Games, the largest multi-sport event in the Americas. The Chilean Olympic Committee (COCH) is the National Olympic Committee for the country and the main organizer for its participation at the Pan American Games.

Chile is one of the six countries that has participated in every edition of the Pan American Games since the 1951 edition, even considering the only Winter edition held in 1990. (Note: The other countries that have participated in all Summer and Winter Pan American Games are Argentina, Brazil, Canada, Mexico and United States.)

After several failed attempts to organize the Games, Santiago hosted the 2023 Pan American Games. At those Games, Chile won 79 medals, being its most successful participation. The largest amount of gold medals was reached in the 2019 Pan American Games, when Chilean athletes received a total of 13 gold medals.

== Hosted Games ==
Chile has hosted the Pan American Games once:

Games	Host city	Dates	Nations	Participants	Events
2023 Pan American Games	Santiago	October 20 - November 5	41	6,909	425

Before 2023, Santiago was expected to host the Pan American Games on different occasions but the events were eventually cancelled:

- 1975 Pan American Games: Santiago was elected unanimously as the host city in 1969. The Games were cancelled in December 1973 by the military junta due to the economic crisis in the country and the turmoil after the coup d'état. The Games were moved to São Paulo initially, and later to Mexico City.
- 1987 Pan American Games: Santiago was elected by the members of PASO as the host city in 1981. The Games were cancelled later in 1983 by the military junta, due to a severe economic crisis. Quito, the runner-up city, was chosen initially as its replacement, but it cancelled too a few months later. Eventually, Indianapolis was elected as the definitive host city.
- 1993 Winter Pan American Games: The second edition of the Winter Pan American Games was expected to be held in Santiago. However, the first edition of the Games was not successful and the potential absence of the United States in future editions led to the suspension of the Games.
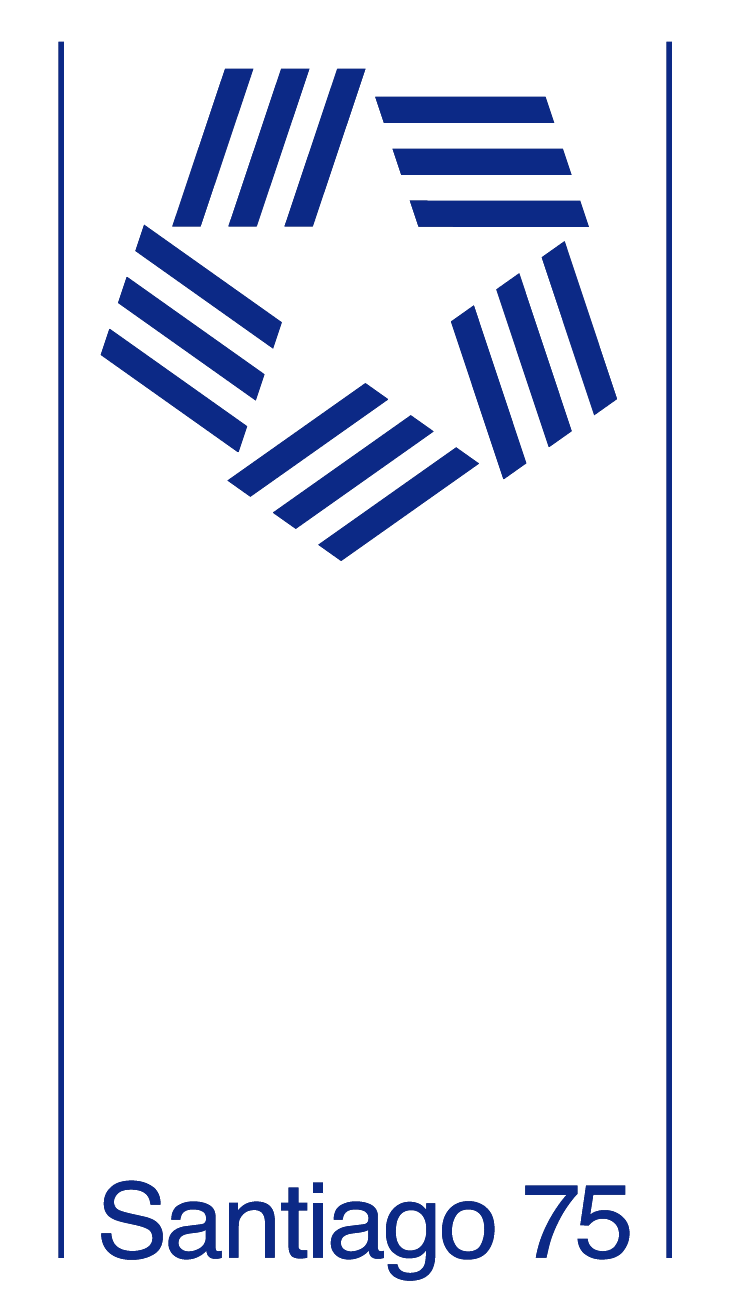
Logo of the cancelled 1975 Pan American Games

Logo of the 2023 Pan American Games

== Pan American Games ==
=== Medals by games ===
Hosting edition

Games	Gold	Silver	Bronze	Total	Gold medals	Total medals
(Argentina) 1951 Buenos Aires	8	19	12	39	3	3
1955 Mexico City	4	8	13	25	4	4
(United States) 1959 Chicago	5	2	6	13	6	8
(Brazil) 1963 São Paulo	2	1	6	9	9	9
(Canada) 1967 Winnipeg	1	1	3	5	11	11
(Colombia) 1971 Cali	0	3	4	7	16	12
1975 Mexico City	0	0	2	2	18	16
(Puerto Rico) 1979 San Juan	1	4	6	11	8	9
(Venezuela) 1983 Caracas	1	3	9	13	10	10
(United States) 1987 Indianapolis	1	2	4	7	13	14
(Cuba) 1991 Havana	2	1	7	10	10	10
(Argentina) 1995 Mar del Plata	2	6	11	19	9	10
(Canada) 1999 Winnipeg	1	4	7	12	12	10
(Dominican Republic) 2003 Santo Domingo	2	10	10	22	13	10
(Brazil) 2007 Rio de Janeiro	6	5	9	20	10	11
(Mexico) 2011 Guadalajara	3	16	24	43	13	9
(Canada) 2015 Toronto	5	6	18	29	11	10
(Peru) 2019 Lima	13	19	18	50	8	8
(Chile) 2023 Santiago	12	31	36	79	8	6
Total	69	141	205	415	9	9

=== Medals by sport ===
Sport	Gold	Silver	Bronze	Total
Athletics	16	14	21	51
Rowing	10	12	14	36
Equestrian	7	6	13	26
Cycling	6	14	16	36
Roller sports	5	10	12	27
Karate	5	5	10	20
Tennis	3	13	7	23
Shooting	3	7	9	19
Sailing	3	5	9	17
Boxing	2	9	9	20
Water skiing	2	6	11	19
Weightlifting	2	4	4	10
Judo	1	3	3	7
Gymnastics	1	3	2	6
Swimming	1	3	2	6
Triathlon	1	1	0	2
Beach volleyball	1	0	1	2
Fencing	0	6	5	11
Canoeing	0	5	1	6
Football	0	3	2	5
Basketball	0	2	3	5
Archery	0	2	1	3
Table tennis	0	1	12	13
Taekwondo	0	1	7	8
Field hockey	0	1	6	7
Wrestling	0	1	5	6
Handball	0	1	3	4
Modern pentathlon	0	1	2	3
Rugby sevens	0	1	0	1
Surfing	0	1	0	1
Basque pelota	0	0	6	6
Racquetball	0	0	3	3
Golf	0	0	2	2
Squash	0	0	2	2
Bodybuilding	0	0	1	1
Breaking	0	0	1	1
Totals (36 entries)	69	141	205	415

== Summary by sport ==
=== Archery ===
Games	Gold	Silver	Bronze	Total	Ranking
(Canada) 1999 Winnipeg	0	1	0	1	3
(Peru) 2019 Lima	0	1	0	1	7
(Chile) 2023 Santiago	0	0	1	1	7
Total	0	2	1	3	10

=== Athletics ===
Games	Gold	Silver	Bronze	Total	Ranking
(Argentina) 1951 Buenos Aires	3	6	3	12	3
1955 Mexico City	2	1	6	9	3
(United States) 1959 Chicago	1	1	0	2	3
(Brazil) 1963 Sao Paulo	1	0	0	1	7
(Colombia) 1971 Cali	0	0	1	1	11
(Venezuela) 1983 Caracas	1	1	2	4	7
(United States) 1987 Indianapolis	1	0	1	2	6
(Cuba) 1991 Havana	1	0	0	1	7
(Argentina) 1995 Mar del Plata	0	0	2	2	13
(Canada) 1999 Winnipeg	1	0	1	2	9
(Dominican Republic) 2003 Santo Domingo	0	2	1	3	11
(Mexico) 2011 Guadalajara	1	0	0	1	11
(Canada) 2015 Toronto	0	0	2	2	21
(Peru) 2019 Lima	1	1	1	3	10
(Chile) 2023 Santiago	3	2	1	6	7
Total	16	14	21	51	8

=== Boxing ===
Games	Gold	Silver	Bronze	Total	Ranking
(Argentina) 1951 Buenos Aires	0	4	2	6	2
1955 Mexico City	0	3	1	4	6
(United States) 1959 Chicago	1	0	2	3	4
(Brazil) 1963 São Paulo	1	0	0	1	6
(Canada) 1967 Winnipeg	0	0	1	1	10
(Colombia) 1971 Cali	0	1	0	1	8
(Puerto Rico) 1979 San Juan	0	0	1	1	11
(Argentina) 1995 Mar del Plata	0	1	0	1	8
(Canada) 2015 Toronto	0	0	1	1	11
(Chile) 2023 Santiago	0	0	1	1	12
Total	2	9	9	20	11

=== Canoeing ===
Games	Gold	Silver	Bronze	Total	Ranking
(Dominican Republic) 2003 Santo Domingo	0	1	0	1	7
(Mexico) 2011 Guadalajara	0	0	1	1	8
(Peru) 2019 Lima	0	2	0	2	7
(Chile) 2023 Santiago	0	2	0	2	7
Total	0	5	1	6	8

=== Cycling ===
Games	Gold	Silver	Bronze	Total	Ranking
(Argentina) 1951 Buenos Aires	1	3	1	5	2
1975 Mexico City	0	0	1	1	8
(Puerto Rico) 1979 San Juan	1	1	1	3	3
(Venezuela) 1983 Caracas	0	0	1	1	8
(Cuba) 1991 Havana	0	0	1	1	8
(Argentina) 1995 Mar del Plata	0	1	0	1	7
(Canada) 1999 Winnipeg	0	0	1	1	8
(Dominican Republic) 2003 Santo Domingo	1	2	2	5	6
(Brazil) 2007 Rio de Janeiro	2	0	0	2	6
(Mexico) 2011 Guadalajara	0	2	1	3	8
(Peru) 2019 Lima	1	1	4	6	7
(Chile) 2023 Santiago	0	4	3	7	6
Total	6	14	16	36	9

=== Equestrian ===
Games	Gold	Silver	Bronze	Total	Ranking
(Argentina) 1951 Buenos Aires	4	2	2	8	1
1955 Mexico City	1	0	2	3	3
(United States) 1959 Chicago	1	1	2	4	2
(Brazil) 1963 São Paulo	0	0	3	3	3
(Canada) 1967 Winnipeg	1	1	1	3	3
(Colombia) 1971 Cali	0	2	2	4	3
(United States) 1987 Indianapolis	0	0	1	1	4
Total	7	6	13	26	5

=== Fencing ===
Games	Gold	Silver	Bronze	Total	Ranking
(Brazil) 1963 São Paulo	0	1	1	2	4
(Argentina) 1995 Mar del Plata	0	0	1	1	5
(Canada) 1999 Winnipeg	0	1	0	1	6
(Dominican Republic) 2003 Santo Domingo	0	0	1	1	6
(Brazil) 2007 Rio de Janeiro	0	1	1	2	5
(Mexico) 2011 Guadalajara	0	1	0	1	5
(Peru) 2019 Lima	0	1	0	1	7
(Chile) 2023 Santiago	0	1	1	2	6
Total	0	6	5	11	8

=== Golf ===
Games	Gold	Silver	Bronze	Total	Ranking
(Canada) 2015 Toronto	0	0	1	1	4
(Peru) 2019 Lima	0	0	1	1	4
Total	0	0	2	2	7

=== Gymnastics ===
Games	Gold	Silver	Bronze	Total	Ranking
(Brazil) 2007 Rio de Janeiro	0	1	1	2	9
(Mexico) 2011 Guadalajara	0	2	1	3	8
(Peru) 2019 Lima	1	0	0	1	5
Total	1	3	2	6	12

=== Judo ===
Games	Gold	Silver	Bronze	Total	Ranking
(Puerto Rico) 1979 San Juan	0	0	1	1	9
(Venezuela) 1983 Caracas	0	0	1	1	8
(Peru) 2019 Lima	1	0	1	2	5
(Chile) 2023 Santiago	0	3	0	3	5
Total	1	3	3	7	11

=== Karate ===
Games	Gold	Silver	Bronze	Total	Ranking
(Brazil) 2007 Rio de Janeiro	1	0	2	3	4
(Mexico) 2011 Guadalajara	0	1	4	5	9
(Canada) 2015 Toronto	0	1	2	3	9
(Peru) 2019 Lima	1	2	1	4	6
(Chile) 2023 Santiago	3	1	1	5	1
Total	5	5	10	20	6

=== Modern Pentathlon ===
Games	Gold	Silver	Bronze	Total	Ranking
1955 Mexico City	0	0	1	1	3
(Mexico) 2011 Guadalajara	0	0	1	1	5
(Peru) 2019 Lima	0	1	0	1	5
Total	0	1	2	3	7

=== Rowing ===
Games	Gold	Silver	Bronze	Total	Ranking
(Argentina) 1951 Buenos Aires	0	2	0	2	2
1955 Mexico City	0	0	2	2	5
(United States) 1959 Chicago	0	0	1	1	6
(Venezuela) 1983 Caracas	0	1	0	1	7
(United States) 1987 Indianapolis	0	1	0	1	8
(Canada) 1999 Winnipeg	0	0	2	2	7
(Dominican Republic) 2003 Santo Domingo	1	0	1	2	5
(Brazil) 2007 Rio de Janeiro	1	0	1	2	5
(Mexico) 2011 Guadalajara	0	0	1	1	8
(Canada) 2015 Toronto	1	1	2	4	5
(Peru) 2019 Lima	4	2	2	8	2
(Chile) 2023 Santiago	3	5	2	10	2
Total	10	12	14	36	6

=== Sailing ===
Games	Gold	Silver	Bronze	Total	Ranking
(Argentina) 1951 Buenos Aires	0	0	1	1	3
(Venezuela) 1983 Caracas	0	1	0	1	6
(Cuba) 1991 Havana	0	1	0	1	7
(Argentina) 1995 Mar del Plata	1	0	0	1	6
(Dominican Republic) 2003 Santo Domingo	0	0	2	2	10
(Brazil) 2007 Rio de Janeiro	1	0	0	1	5
(Mexico) 2011 Guadalajara	1	1	1	3	3
(Canada) 2015 Toronto	0	0	2	2	10
(Peru) 2019 Lima	0	0	1	1	8
(Chile) 2023 Santiago	0	2	2	4	7
Total	3	5	9	17	9

=== Shooting ===
Games	Gold	Silver	Bronze	Total	Ranking
(Argentina) 1951 Buenos Aires	0	1	2	3	6
1955 Mexico City	1	3	0	4	4
(United States) 1959 Chicago	1	0	0	1	3
(Canada) 1967 Winnipeg	0	0	1	1	8
(Colombia) 1971 Cali	0	0	1	1	7
(Puerto Rico) 1979 San Juan	0	1	0	1	5
(Venezuela) 1983 Caracas	0	0	3	3	10
(Mexico) 2011 Guadalajara	0	1	1	2	7
(Canada) 2015 Toronto	0	0	1	1	11
(Peru) 2019 Lima	0	1	0	1	6
(Chile) 2023 Santiago	1	0	0	1	5
Total	3	7	9	19	11

=== Surfing ===
Games	Gold	Silver	Bronze	Total	Ranking
(Chile) 2023 Santiago	0	1	0	1	7
Total	0	1	0	1	8

=== Swimming ===
Games	Gold	Silver	Bronze	Total	Ranking
(Dominican Republic) 2003 Santo Domingo	0	0	1	1	8
(Mexico) 2011 Guadalajara	1	0	1	2	7
(Canada) 2015 Toronto	0	1	0	1	7
(Peru) 2019 Lima	0	1	0	1	6
(Chile) 2023 Santiago	0	1	0	1	7
Total	1	3	2	6	12

=== Table tennis ===
Games	Gold	Silver	Bronze	Total	Ranking
(Venezuela) 1983 Caracas	0	0	1	1	7
(United States) 1987 Indianapolis	0	0	1	1	5
(Cuba) 1991 Havana	0	0	1	1	5
(Argentina) 1995 Mar del Plata	0	1	2	3	4
(Canada) 1999 Winnipeg	0	0	2	2	4
(Dominican Republic) 2003 Santo Domingo	0	0	1	1	5
(Chile) 2023 Santiago	0	0	4	4	6
Total	0	1	12	13	8

=== Taekwondo ===
Games	Gold	Silver	Bronze	Total	Ranking
(Cuba) 1991 Havana	0	0	1	1	10
(Argentina) 1995 Mar del Plara	0	0	1	1	13
(Mexico) 2011 Guadalajara	0	0	2	2	11
(Peru) 2019 Lima	0	0	2	2	10
(Chile) 2023 Santiago	0	1	1	2	9
Total	0	1	7	8	14

== Best results in non-medaling sports ==
Summer
Sport	Rank	Athlete	Event & year
Artistic swimming	5th	Antonia Mella; Isidora Letelier; Josefa Morales; Nicolás Campos; Rocio Vargas; Soledad García; Theodora Garrido; Trinidad García; Valentina Valdivia	Team in 2023
Badminton	5th	Cristián Araya and Esteban Mujica	Men's doubles in 2011
Badminton	5th	Ashley Montre and Constanza Naranjo	Women's doubles in 2019
Badminton	5th	Alonso Medel and Vania Díaz	Mixed doubles in 2023
Baseball	8th	Chile men's team	Men's tournament in 2023
Bowling	7th	Verónica Valdebenito and María José Caro	Women's doubles in 2023
Diving	5th	Wendy Espina and Paula Sotomayor	Women's synchronized 3 metre springboard in 2011
Softball	8th	Chile women's team	Women's tournament in 2023
Sport climbing	5th	Alejandra Contreras	Women's boulder & lead in 2023
Volleyball	4th	Chile men's team	Men's tournament in 2019
Water polo	5th	Chile men's team	Men's tournament in 1951
Winter
Sport	Rank	Athlete	Event & year
Alpine skiing	> 10th	details not available (1990)	

== Winter Pan American Games ==
=== Medals by games ===
Games	Gold	Silver	Bronze	Total	Gold medals	Total medals
(Argentina) 1990 Las Leñas	0	0	0	0	–	–

== Junior Pan American Games ==
=== Medals by games ===
Games	Gold	Silver	Bronze	Total	Gold medals	Total medals
(Colombia) 2021 Cali-Valle	12	15	31	58	8th	6th
(Paraguay) 2025 Asunción	18	19	28	65	8th	6th
Total	30	34	59	123	7th	6th
