= Pan American Games sports =

Sports included in the Pan American Games

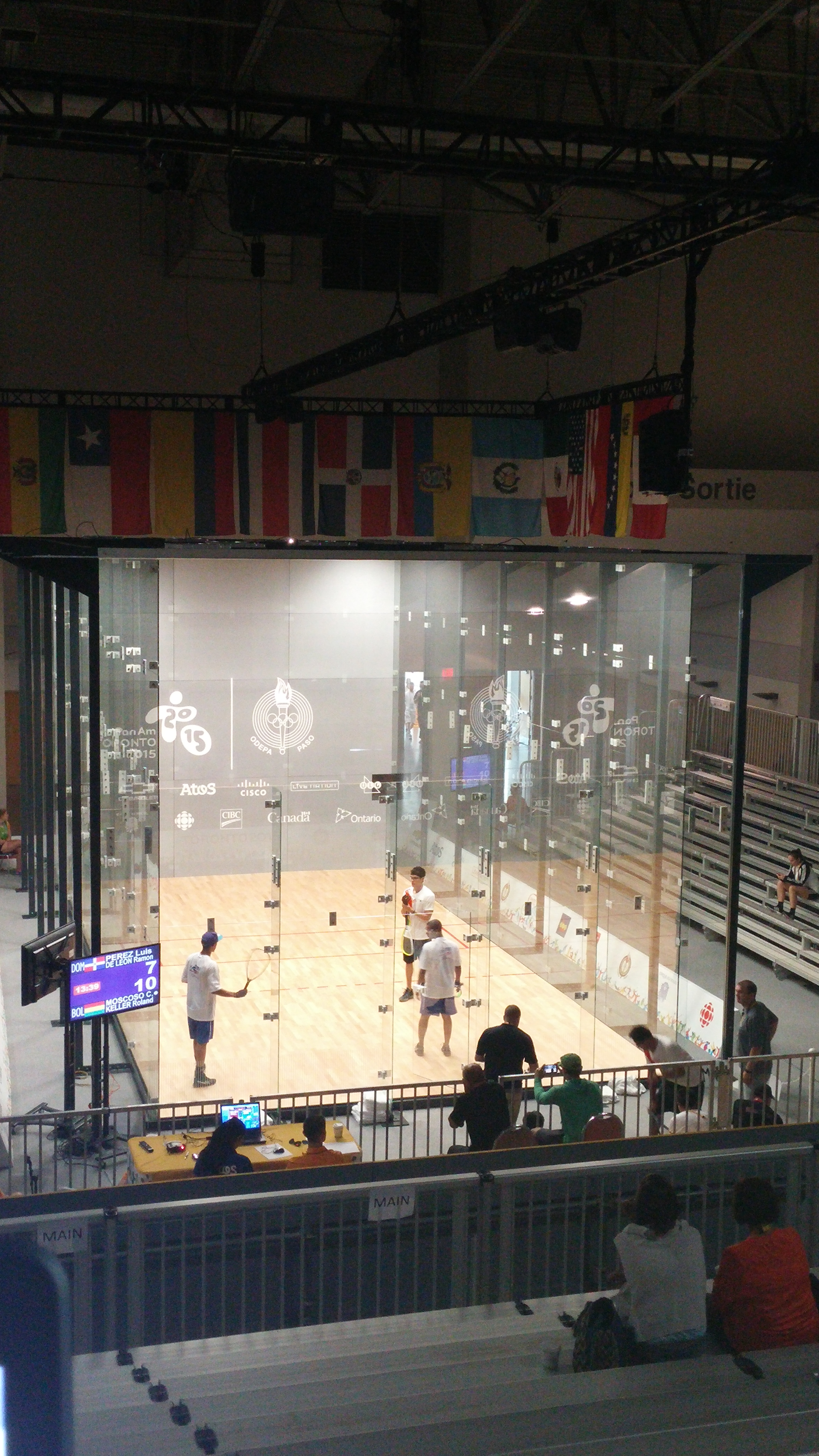
The Racquetball competition held during the Toronto 2015 Pan American Games, one of the non-Olympic sports played on the sports program.

The Pan American Games sports comprise all the sports contested in the Summer Olympic Games. In addition, traditional and popular sports throughout the Americas which are not contested at the Olympic Games are also contested such as bowling and baseball. As of 2015, the Pan American Games included 36 sports with 51 disciplines and 364 events. The number and kinds of events may change slightly from one Pan American Games to another.

== Sports, disciplines, events ==
For purposes of Pan American Games competition, the Pan American Sports Organization (PASO) makes a distinction between sports and disciplines. A sport, in Pan American Games terms, is a single or group of disciplines as represented by an international governing body, namely an International Federation. For example, aquatics, represented at the Olympic level by the International Swimming Federation, is a sport at the Pan American Games that includes the swimming, diving, synchronized swimming and water polo disciplines.

Every Summer Olympic discipline is currently on the Pan American Games program. The last such discipline to be added was canoe slalom, which made its debut in 2015 in Toronto, Canada. The discipline had been scheduled to be held at both the 2007 and 2011 Pan American Games, but had been dropped both times due to the small number of competing countries. The Games also include some disciplines which have never been contested at a Summer Olympics. Examples can be found in baseball and softball, now considered a single Pan Am Games sport due to sharing a single international federation. Both were last contested in the Olympics in 2008 and will return in 2020, but baseball has been strictly for men and softball for women. In the Pan Am Games, men's softball has been on the program on several occasions, most recently in 2015; women's baseball made its debut in 2015.

Medals are awarded on a per-event basis; there can be one or more events per sport or discipline. In fact, every current Pan American Games discipline has at least two events.

=== Changes ===
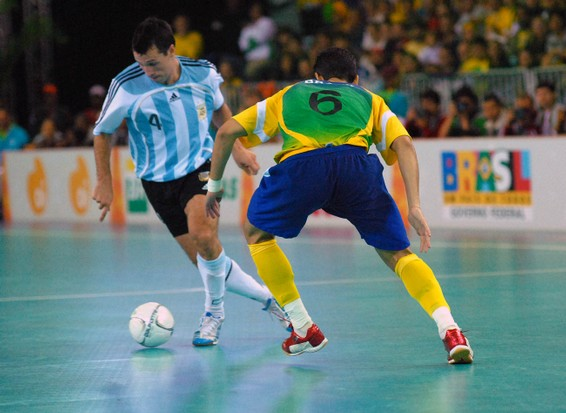
Futsal was dropped after being played at only one Games.

The Pan American Games charter establishes that they comprise the program of the Games, the 28 compulsory sports of the program of the Olympic Games plus seven sports recognized by the entity, due to its popularity in the American continent, if a new sport becomes Olympic it is automatically added to the program of the Pan American Games. This only happens, if the number of national federations in the Americas is sufficient. In the same way that it happens in the Universiade, the Organizing Committee of the each edition can request the inclusion of new sports or disciplines, respecting the local demands. An example of this is the removal of the Basque pelota in the program of the Games of 2007 and 2015 and its replacement respectively by futsal. and the woman's baseball tournament.

Until the 2011 Games in Guadalajara, just one Olympic event was never held, the canoe slalom. The event was planned to be held in the 2007 and 2011 editions, but was eventually canceled due to the low number of entries. Thus, the event was held for the first time at the 2015 Games.

Previous Pan American Games have included sports which are no longer present on the current program, like futsal and polo.

The International Olympic Committee voted on October 9, 2009, during the 121st IOC Session in Copenhagen, to elevate both rugby sevens and golf as official Olympic sports and to include them in the Olympics, beginning with the 2016 Olympic Games. With this development, rugby sevens made its debut at the 2011 Pan American Games in Guadalajara, and golf was played at the 2015 Pan American Games before becoming an Olympic sport. In 2015, as a result of a request from the organizing committee, PASO decided to include surfing in the 2019 Pan American Games program. The following year, a few days before the opening ceremony of the 2016 Summer Olympics, surfing was integrated to the 2020 Summer Olympics program.

Multiple new sports and events were added to the 2023 Games; breaking, skateboarding and sport climbing.

Cricket will make its Pan American Games debut in 2027. The sports of basketball, breaking, bowling and racquetball were dropped, with the earlier not being contested for the first time ever at the Pan American Games, due to a dispute between FIBA and Panam Sports.

=== Current Pan American Games program ===
The following sports (or disciplines of a sport) make up the current Pan American Games official program and are listed alphabetically according to the name used by PASO. The figures in each cell indicate the number of events for each sport contested at the respective Games; a bullet (•) denotes that the sport/discipline was scheduled to be competed, but was dropped due to a lack of entries.

Nine of the 39 sports (Aquatics, Basketball, Canoeing, Cycling, Football, Gymnastics, Volleyball, Equestrian and Wrestling) consist of multiple disciplines. Disciplines from the same sport are grouped under the same heading:

For equestrian and wrestling, the figures in each cell indicate the number of events for each sport, and not for each discipline separately.

The following sports have been contested at the Pan American Games:

Sport (Discipline)	Body	51	55	59	63	67	71	75	79	83	87	91	95	99	03	07	11	15	19	23	27
Artistic swimming	WAquatics		3		3	3	3	3	3	3	3	3	3	2	2	2	2	2	2	2	X
Diving	WAquatics	4	4	4	4	4	4	4	4	4	4	6	6	4	8	8	8	8	10	10	X
Marathon swimming	WAquatics															2	2	2	2	2	X
Swimming	WAquatics	21	21	21	21	30	30	30	30	30	32	32	32	32	32	32	32	32	34	36	X
Water polo	WAquatics	1	1	1	1	1	1	1	1	1	1	1	1	2	2	2	2	2	2	2	X
Basketball	FIBA	1	2	2	2	2	2	2	2	2	2	2	2	2	2	2	2	2	2	2	
3x3 basketball	FIBA																		2	2	
Canoe/kayak (sprint)	PW										12	13	13	12	12	12	12	13	12	10	X
Canoe/kayak (slalom)	PW															•	•	5	6	6	X
Figure skating	WSkate								3		4	6	6	4	2	2	2	2	2	2	X
Speed skating	WSkate								12		12	13	23	6	4	4	6	6	6	8	X
Skateboarding	WSkate																			4	X
Baseball	WBSC	1	1	1	1	1	1	1	1	1	1	1	1	1	1	1	1	2	1	1	X
Softball	WBSC								2	2	2	2	2	2	2	1	1	2	2	1	X
BMX freestyle	UCI																		2	2	X
BMX racing	UCI															2	2	2	2	2	X
Mountain biking	UCI												2	2	2	2	2	2	2	2	X
Road cycling	UCI	3	2	2	2	2	2	2	2	2	3	4	4	4	4	4	4	4	4	4	X
Track cycling	UCI	5	3	3	3	4	4	4	4	5	7	7	8	12	12	10	10	10	12	12	X
Artistic	World Gymnastics	8	12	18	14	14	14	14	14	14	14	14	14	14	14	14	14	14	14	14	X
Rhythmic	World Gymnastics										5	7	7	2	6	8	8	8	8	8	X
Trampoline	World Gymnastics															2	2	2	2	4	X
Volleyball (beach)	FIVB													2	2	2	2	2	2	2	X
Volleyball (indoor)	FIVB		2	2	2	2	2	2	2	2	2	2	2	2	2	2	2	2	2	2	X
Dressage	FEI	6	5	6	6	6	6	6	4	4	6	4	6	6	4	6	6	6	6	6	X
Eventing	FEI	6	5	6	6	6	6	6	4	4	6	4	6	6	4	6	6	6	6	6	X
Jumping	FEI	6	5	6	6	6	6	6	4	4	6	4	6	6	4	6	6	6	6	6	X
Freestyle	UWW	8	8	8	8	8	10	20	20	20	20	20	20	16	18	18	18	18	18	18	X
Greco-Roman	UWW	8	8	8	8	8	10	20	20	20	20	20	20	16	18	18	18	18	18	18	X
Archery	WArchery								4	12	4	12	12	4	4	4	4	4	8	10	X
Athletics	WAthletics	33	29	32	33	35	37	37	39	40	48	43	44	47	46	47	47	47	48	48	X
Badminton	BWF												5	5	5	5	5	5	5	5	X
Basque pelota	FIPV												12		6		10		10	8	X
Bowling	WTBA									Demo		4	8	4	4	4	4	4	4	4	X
Boxing	WB	8	10	10	10	10	11	11	11	12	12	12	12	12	11	11	13	13	15	13	X
Cricket	ICC																				X
Fencing	FIE	7	7	8	8	8	8	8	8	8	8	10	10	10	10	10	12	12	12	12	X
Field hockey	FIH					1	1	1	1	1	2	2	2	2	2	2	2	2	2	2	X
Football	FIFA	1	1	1	1	1	1	1	1	1	1	1	1	2	2	2	2	2	2	2	X
Golf	IGF																	3	3	2	X
Handball	IHF										2	1	2	2	2	2	2	2	2	2	X
Judo	IJF				4	6		6	8	16	16	18	18	14	14	14	14	14	14	15	X
Karate	WKF												10	11	9	9	10	10	14	12	X
Modern pentathlon	UIPM	2	2	2	2						1	1	1	2	2	2	2	2	5	5	X
Racquetball	IRF												6	4	4		6	6	6	7	X
Rowing	WRowing	7	7	7	7	7	7	8	8	10	15	20	21	14	14	13	14	14	14	13	X
Rugby sevens	WRugby																1	2	2	2	X
Sailing	WSailing	2		7	6	4	3	4	5	8	6	9	11	10	8	9	9	10	10	13	X
Shooting	ISSF	14	16	21	12	10	10	14	14	32	22	34	36	15	17	15	15	15	15	15	X
Sport climbing	World Climbing																			4	X
Squash	WSquash												4	4	4	4	6	6	7	7	X
Surfing	ISA																		8	8	X
Table tennis	ITTF								7	7	7	7	7	6	6	4	4	4	7	7	X
Taekwondo	WTaekwondo										8	8	16	8	8	8	8	8	12	11	X
Tennis	World Tennis	5	5	5	5	5		5	5	5	5	6	6	4	4	4	5	5	5	5	X
Triathlon	WTriathlon												2	2	2	2	2	2	3	3	X
Water skiing	IWWF												6	6	6	7	9	9	10	10	X
Weightlifting	IWF	5	7	7	7	7	9	9	10	10	10	10	10	15	15	15	15	15	14	10	X
Total events		140	146	166	160	169	164	190	249	249	296	331	408	330	338	331	361	364	421	417	???

=== Discontinued sports ===
The following sports were previously part of the Pan American Games program as official sports, but are no longer on the current program.

==== Summer sports ====
Sport	Body	51	55	59	63	67	71	75	79	83	87	91	95	99	03	07	11	15	19	23	27
Inline hockey	WSkate													1	1						
Roller hockey	WSkate								1		1	1	1								
Breaking	WDSF																			2	
Bodybuilding	IFBB																		2		
Futsal	FIFA															1					
Polo	FIP	1																			
Sambo	FIAS									20											
Total events		1							1	20	1	1	1	1	1	1			2	2	

==== Winter sports ====
Sport	Body	90
Alpine skiing	FIS	6
Total events		6

== Related article ==
- Olympic sports
