= 1979 Pan American Games medal table =

- Location: San Juan, Puerto Rico

Highlights
- Most gold medals: United States (126)
- Most total medals: United States (266)

The 1979 Pan American Games, officially known as the VIII Pan American Games, were a continental multi-sport event held in San Juan, Puerto Rico, from 1 to 15 July 1979. At the Games, 3,700 athletes selected from 34 National Olympic Committees (NOCs) participated in events in 22 sports. Twenty-one nations earned medals during the competition, including nine who won at least one gold medal.

== Medal table ==
The ranking in this table is based on medal counts published by several media organizations. By default, the table is ordered by the number of gold medals won by the athletes representing a nation. (In this context, a nation is an entity represented by an NOC). The number of silver medals is taken into consideration next and then the number of bronze medals. If nations are still tied, equal ranking is given and they are listed alphabetically by IOC country code.

To sort this table by nation, total medal count, or any other column, click on the icon next to the column title.

* Host nation (Puerto Rico)

Rank	Nation	Gold	Silver	Bronze	Total
1	United States	126	95	45	266
2	Cuba	64	47	34	145
3	Canada	24	43	71	138
4	Argentina	12	7	17	36
5	Brazil	9	13	17	39
6	Mexico	3	6	29	38
7	Puerto Rico*	2	9	10	21
8	Chile	1	4	6	11
9	Venezuela	1	4	4	9
10	Dominican Republic	0	5	10	15
11	Jamaica	0	4	1	5
12	Panama	0	2	2	4
13	Guyana	0	2	1	3
14	Colombia	0	1	8	9
15	Peru	0	1	2	3
16	Bahamas	0	1	0	1
17	Ecuador	0	0	2	2
18	Belize	0	0	1	1
18	El Salvador	0	0	1	1
18	Netherlands Antilles	0	0	1	1
18	Virgin Islands	0	0	1	1
Totals (21 entries)		242	244	263	749

== Notes ==
- ^a Some sources state that Canada achieved 70 bronze medals, despite the majority of reports counting 71. This would result in a total of 137 medals earned by Canadian athletes during the Games.
