= 1963 Pan American Games medal table =

- Location: São Paulo, Brazil

Highlights
- Most gold medals: United States (110)
- Most total medals: United States (208)

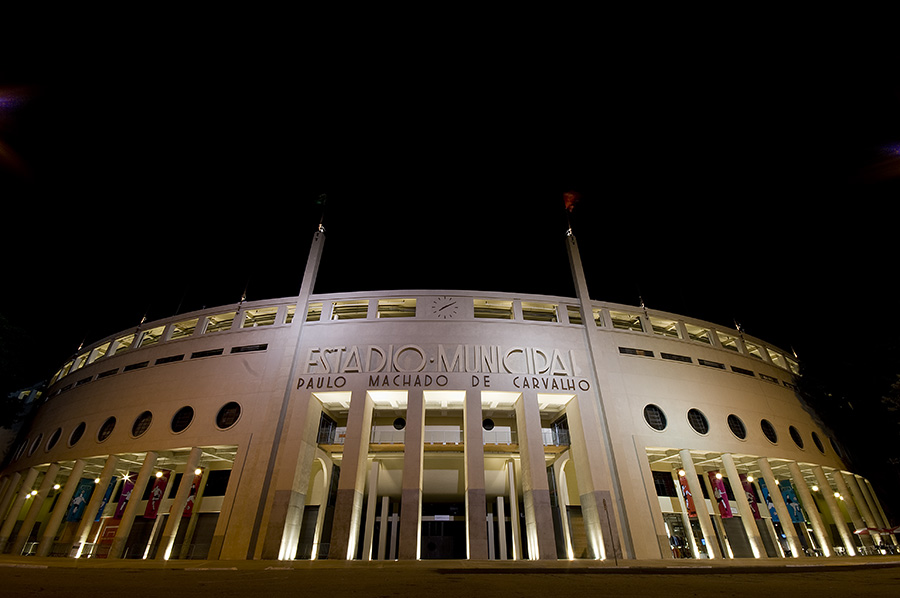
Paulo Machado de Carvalho Municipal Stadium, the main venue of the 1963 Pan American Games

The 1963 Pan American Games, officially known as the IV Pan American Games, were a continental multi-sport event held in São Paulo, Brazil, from April 20 to May 5, 1963. At the Games, 1,665 athletes selected from 22 National Olympic Committees (NOCs) participated in events in 19 sports. Eighteen nations earned medals during the competition and eleven won at least one gold. Barbados, debuting at the Pan American Games, won its first medals (three bronze), while British Guiana won its first ever gold medal. Colombia, Costa Rica, the Dominican Republic, Haiti, Nicaragua and Paraguay did not send athletes to São Paulo, making it the Games with the lowest number of competitors in history.

Brazil, Canada, Cuba, Guatemala, the Netherlands Antilles, Puerto Rico, Trinidad and Tobago, Uruguay and Venezuela improved their position in the general medal table compared to the 1959 Pan American Games. The United States led the medal count, winning a total of 199 medals (106 gold, 56 silver and 37 bronze).^{[A]} Competitors from the host nation, Brazil, won 14 gold medals, 20 silver medals and 18 bronze medals, finishing the Games in second place and marking the country's best performance to date, as well as its highest-ever position in the medal table.

Judo made its debut in the Pan American Games. Brazil, as the host, was allowed to compete in all sports, bringing 385 athletes to the Games. Brazilian competitors won more medals in boxing than in any other sport (three gold, five silver and one bronze), followed by athletics (two silver and six bronze) and tennis (three gold).

== Medal table ==
The ranking in this table is based on medal counts published by several media organizations and according to information provided by some NOCs, such as the Brazilian Olympic Committee (BOC). However, there were no details regarding the number of events or the discrepancy between the number of gold, silver and bronze medals. By default, the table is ordered by the number of gold medals won by the athletes representing a nation. (In this context, a nation is an entity represented by an NOC). The number of silver medals is taken into consideration next and then the number of bronze medals. If nations are still tied, equal ranking is given and they are listed alphabetically by IOC country code.

* Host nation (Brazil)

Rank	Nation	Gold	Silver	Bronze	Total
1	United States	110	59	39	208
2	Brazil*	14	21	18	53
3	Canada	8	23	25	56
4	Argentina	8	16	17	41
5	Cuba	4	5	4	13
6	Uruguay	4	1	7	12
7	Venezuela	3	8	9	20
8	Mexico	2	8	16	26
9	Chile	2	1	5	8
10	Trinidad and Tobago	1	2	2	5
11	British Guiana	1	0	0	1
12	Netherlands Antilles	0	4	2	6
13	Panama	0	2	3	5
14	Jamaica	0	2	2	4
14	Puerto Rico	0	2	2	4
16	Guatemala	0	2	0	2
17	Peru	0	1	1	2
18	Barbados	0	0	3	3
Totals (18 entries)		157	157	155	469
