= 1975 Pan American Games medal table =

- Location: Mexico City, Mexico

Highlights
- Most gold medals: United States (117)
- Most total medals: United States (247) ^{a}

The 1975 Pan American Games, officially known as the VII Pan American Games, were a continental multi-sport event held in Mexico City, Mexico, from 12 to 26 October 1975. At the Games, 3,146 athletes selected from 33 National Olympic Committees (NOCs) participated in events in 19 sports. Twenty-three nations earned medals during the competition, and nine won at least one gold medal.

== Medal table ==
The ranking in this table is based on medal counts published by several media organizations. By default, the table is ordered by the number of gold medals won by the athletes representing a nation. (In this context, a nation is an entity represented by an NOC). The number of silver medals is taken into consideration next and then the number of bronze medals. If nations are still tied, equal ranking is given and they are listed alphabetically by IOC country code.

^{1}	Host nation

To sort this table by nation, total medal count, or any other column, click on the icon next to the column title.

Rank	Nation	Gold	Silver	Bronze	Total
1	United States ^{a}	117	82	48/47	247/246
2	Cuba ^{b}	56/57	45	33/32	134
3	Canada ^{c}	19/18	35	40/38	94/91
4	Mexico ^{1}	9	13	38	60
5	Brazil	8	13	23	44
6	Argentina	3	5	7	15
7	Colombia	2	4	4	10
8	Ecuador	1	1	1	3
9	Guyana	1	1	0	2
9	Peru	1	1	0	2
11	Puerto Rico	0	3	7	10
12	Panama	0	2	2	4
13	Venezuela	0	1	11	12
14	Dominican Republic	0	1	7	8
15	Jamaica	0	1	3	4
16	Netherlands Antilles	0	1	0	1
16	Trinidad and Tobago	0	1	0	1
18	Chile	0	0	2	2
18	Uruguay	0	0	2	2
20	Barbados	0	0	1	1
20	El Salvador	0	0	1	1
20	Guatemala	0	0	1	1
20	Nicaragua	0	0	1	1
Total		217	210	232/228	659/655

== Notes ==
- ^a Some sources say that the United States achieved 47 bronze medals, while others count 48. This would result in a total of 246 medals earned by American athletes during the Games.
- ^b Some reports say that Cuba earned 57 gold medals and 32 bronze medals, instead of 56 and 33, respectively. This would result in the same total medal count for Cuban athletes during the Games.
- ^c Some sources state that Canada actually achieved 18 gold medals and 38 bronze medals, despite reports counting 19 and 40, respectively. This would result in a total of 91 medals earned by Canadian athletes during the Games.
