= 1955 Pan American Games medal table =

- Location: Mexico City, Mexico

Highlights
- Most gold medals: United States (81) ^{a}
- Most total medals: United States (177) ^{a}

The 1955 Pan American Games, officially known as the II Pan American Games, were a continental multi-sport event held in Mexico City, Mexico, from March 12 to March 26, 1955. At the Games, 2,583 athletes selected from 21 National Olympic Committees (NOCs) participated in events in 17 sports. Seventeen nations earned medals during the competition, and twelve won at least one gold medal.

== Medal table ==
The ranking in this table is based on medal counts published by several media organizations. By default, the table is ordered by the number of gold medals won by the athletes representing a nation. (In this context, a nation is an entity represented by a NOC). The number of silver medals is taken into consideration next and then the number of bronze medals. If nations are still tied, equal ranking is given and they are listed alphabetically by IOC country code.

^{1}	Host nation
^{2}	Debuting nation
^{3}	First ever gold medal

To sort this table by nation, total medal count, or any other column, click on the icon next to the column title.

Rank	Nation	Gold	Silver	Bronze	Total
1	United States ^{a}	81/88	58	38	177/184
2	Argentina ^{b}	27	31/33	15/20	73/80
3	Mexico ^{1}	17	11	30	58
4	Chile ^{c}	4	7/8	13	24/25
5	Canada ^{2}	4	4	3	11
6	Venezuela ^{3}	2	5	11	18
7	Brazil ^{d}	2	3	13	18
8	Colombia	2	3	1	6
9	Cuba	1	6	6	13
10	Panama ^{3}	1	1	0	2
11	Guatemala ^{3}	1	0	1	2
11	Dominican Republic ^{2}	1	0	1	2
13	Uruguay	0	6	3	9
14	Puerto Rico ^{2}	0	2	2	4
15	Jamaica	0	2	1	3
16	Netherlands Antilles (AHO) ^{2}	0	1	3	4
17	Trinidad and Tobago (TTO)	0	1	1	2
Total		143/150	141/144	142/147	426/441

== Notes ==
- ^a Some sources appoint that the United States achieved 88 gold medals, while others report 81. This would result in a total of 184 medals earned by American athletes during the Games.
- ^b Some reports say that Argentina earned 33 silver medals and 20 bronze medals, instead of 31 and 15, respectively. This would result in a total of 80 medals earned by Argentinean athletes during the Games.
- ^c Some sources appoint that Chile achieved, in fact, 8 silver medals, not 7. This would result in a total of 25 medals earned by Chilean athletes during the Games.
- ^d Some reports say that Brazil achieved 12 bronze medals and placed fifth in the medal table. This would result in a total of 17 medals earned by Brazilian athletes during the Games. However, the Brazilian Olympic Committee (BOC) confirm that the country placed seventh with 13 bronze medals.
