= 1959 Pan American Games medal table =

- Location: Chicago, United States

Highlights
- Most gold medals: United States (115) ^{a}
- Most total medals: United States (236) ^{a}

The 1959 Pan American Games, officially known as the III Pan American Games, were a continental multi-sport event held in Chicago, United States, from August 27 to September 7, 1959. At the Games, 2,263 athletes selected from 25 National Olympic Committees (NOCs) participated in events in 18 sports. Nineteen nations earned medals during the competition, and eleven won at least one gold medal.

== Medal table ==
The ranking in this table is based on medal counts published by several media organizations. By default, the table is ordered by the number of gold medals won by the athletes representing a nation. (In this context, a nation is an entity represented by a NOC). The number of silver medals is taken into consideration next and then the number of bronze medals. If nations are still tied, equal ranking is given and they are listed alphabetically by IOC country code.

^{1}	Host nation
^{2}	Debuting nation
^{3}	First ever gold medal

To sort this table by nation, total medal count, or any other column, click on the icon next to the column title.

Rank	Nation	Gold	Silver	Bronze	Total
1	United States ^{1} ^{a}	115/122	69/73	52/54	236/249
2	Argentina ^{b}	9	19/22	11/12	39/43
3	Brazil	8	8	6	22
4	Mexico ^{c}	6	11	12/13	29/30
5	Canada ^{d}	5/7	19/21	24/28	48/56
6	Chile	5	2	6	13
7	West Indies^{3}	2	4	8	14
8	Cuba	2	4	4	10
9	Bahamas ^{3}	2	0	0	2
10	Venezuela	1	7	7	15
11	Uruguay ^{3}	1	3	4	8
11	Panama	0	4	4	8
13	Peru	0	2	5	7
14	Puerto Rico	0	2	4	6
15	Ecuador	0	1	1	2
16	Haiti	0	1	0	1
17	Guyana ^{2}	0	0	3	3
18	Netherlands Antilles (AHO)	0	0	1	1
18	Guatemala	0	0	1	1
Total		156/165	156/165	153/161	465/491

== Notes ==
- ^a Some sources appoint that the United States actually achieved 122 gold medals, 73 silver medals and 54 bronze medals, while others report 115, 69 and 52, respectively. This would result in a total of 249 medals earned by American athletes during the Games.
- ^b Some reports say that Argentina earned 22 silver medals and 12 bronze medals, instead of 19 and 11, respectively. This would result in a total of 43 medals earned by Argentinean athletes during the Games.
- ^c Some sources appoint that Mexico achieved 13 bronze medals, not 12. This would result in a total of 30 medals earned by Mexican athletes during the Games.
- ^d Some reports say that Canada placed fourth in the medal table, ahead of Mexico, after achieving 7 gold medals, 21 silver medals and 28 bronze medals. This would result in a total of 56 medals earned by Canadian athletes during the Games.
