= Shooting at the Pan American Games =

- No. of events: 15 (men: 6; women: 6; mixed: 3)

Shooting has been a sport of the Pan American Games since the inaugural 1951 Pan American Games.

== Medal table ==
Updated after the 2023 Pan American Games.

Rank	Nation	Gold	Silver	Bronze	Total
1	United States	242	145	72	459
2	Cuba	35	59	50	144
3	Canada	24	43	60	127
4	Argentina	23	39	41	103
5	Mexico	11	12	34	57
6	Venezuela	6	18	15	39
7	Brazil	6	14	29	49
8	Colombia	6	10	19	35
9	Guatemala	6	2	5	13
10	Peru	3	8	13	24
11	Chile	3	7	9	19
12	Independent Athletes Team	2	1	1	4
13	Ecuador	1	3	6	10
14	Puerto Rico	0	3	9	12
15	Dominican Republic	0	2	0	2
16	El Salvador	0	1	2	3
17	Trinidad and Tobago	0	1	0	1
17	Virgin Islands	0	1	0	1
19	Uruguay	0	0	1	1
Totals (19 entries)		368	369	366	1,103

== See also ==
- List of Pan American Games medalists in shooting
