= Wrestling at the Pan American Games =

- No. of events: 10 (men: 6; women: 4)

Wrestling has been part of the Pan American Games since the 1951 Games in Buenos Aires, Argentina.

== Medal table ==
Updated after the 2023 Pan American Games.

Rank	Nation	Gold	Silver	Bronze	Total
1	United States	151	69	50	270
2	Cuba	106	71	59	236
3	Canada	15	38	70	123
4	Argentina	8	13	12	33
5	Ecuador	4	2	10	16
6	Venezuela	3	34	48	85
7	Brazil	3	7	8	18
8	Mexico	1	22	44	67
9	Colombia	1	12	23	36
10	Puerto Rico	1	6	15	22
11	Dominican Republic	1	6	14	21
12	Panama	0	7	8	15
13	Peru	0	3	11	14
14	Chile	0	1	5	6
15	Honduras	0	1	2	3
16	El Salvador	0	1	1	2
16	Guatemala	0	1	1	2
18	Jamaica	0	0	1	1
Totals (18 entries)		294	294	382	970

== See also ==
- List of Pan American Games medalists in wrestling
- Pan American Wrestling Championships
