= Mexico at the Pan American Games =

- Flag of Mexico
- IOC code: MEX
- NOC: Mexican Olympic Committee
- Website: www.soycom.org (in Spanish)
- Medals Ranked 6th: Gold 310 Silver 362 Bronze 617 Total 1,289

Pan American Games appearances (overview)
- 1951; 1955; 1959; 1963; 1967; 1971; 1975; 1979; 1983; 1987; 1991; 1995; 1999; 2003; 2007; 2011; 2015; 2019; 2023

Mexico has participated in every edition of the Pan American Games since 1951, obtaining 40 medals (4 gold, 9 silver, and 27 bronze) in the first edition in Buenos Aires. In addition, the country is the first, and so far only one, to have hosted three editions of the games, two in Mexico City in 1955 and 1975, and one in Guadalajara in 2011.

Overall, Mexican athletes have won 1,289 all-time medals at the Pan American Games. The best participation of a Mexican delegation has been at the 2023 Pan American Games in Santiago, Chile with 142 medals (52 gold, 38 silver, and 52 bronze). The country has always been inside the top-6 of the medals table, managing a third place overall in the 1955 Pan American Games and achieving fourth place 8 different times. Individually, diver Paola Espinosa is the most decorated Mexican athlete at the Pan American Games, obtaining 15 medals (8 gold, 3 silver, and 4 bronze) in her career.

== Pan American Games ==
=== Medals by games ===
Red border indicates host nation status.

Games	Gold	Silver	Bronze	Total	Gold medals	Total medals
(Argentina) 1951 Buenos Aires	4	7	24	35	6	4
1955 Mexico City	17	11	30	58	3	3
(United States) 1959 Chicago	6	10	15	31	4	4
(Brazil) 1963 São Paulo	2	8	16	26	8	5
(Canada) 1967 Winnipeg	7	16	25	48	6	4
(Colombia) 1971 Cali	7	11	23	41	5	4
1975 Mexico City	9	13	38	60	4	4
(Puerto Rico) 1979 San Juan	3	6	29	38	6	5
(Venezuela) 1983 Caracas	7	11	24	42	6	6
(United States) 1987 Indianapolis	9	11	18	38	6	6
(Cuba) 1991 Havana	14	23	38	75	5	5
(Argentina) 1995 Mar del Plata	23	20	37	80	5	6
(Canada) 1999 Winnipeg	11	16	30	57	6	6
(Dominican Republic) 2003 Santo Domingo	20	27	32	79	5	5
(Brazil) 2007 Rio de Janeiro	18	24	31	73	5	5
(Mexico) 2011 Guadalajara	42	41	50	133	4	4
(Canada) 2015 Toronto	22	30	43	95	6	5
(Peru) 2019 Lima	37	39	62	138	3	4
(Chile) 2023 Santiago	52	38	52	142	3	4
(Peru) 2027 Lima	Future event					
(Paraguay) 2031 Asunción	Future event					
Total	310	362	617	1,289	6	5

=== Medals by sport ===
As of the conclusion of the 2023 Pan American Games.

Leading in that sport

Sport	Gold	Silver	Bronze	Total
Athletics	54	53	40	147
Diving	38	25	22	85
Taekwondo	27	12	19	58
Basque pelota	22	8	7	37
Racquetball	19	4	15	38
Tennis	14	20	17	51
Gymnastics	12	18	35	65
Rowing	12	11	28	51
Shooting	11	12	34	57
Modern pentathlon	10	5	7	22
Cycling	9	28	21	58
Boxing	9	14	40	63
Canoeing	9	10	19	38
Archery	7	14	27	48
Equestrian	7	10	17	34
Weightlifting	5	14	26	45
Football	5	5	7	17
Squash	5	4	19	28
Triathlon	4	1	6	11
Sailing	3	8	7	18
Judo	3	7	18	28
Bowling	3	7	10	20
Fencing	3	6	18	27
Karate	2	11	12	25
Artistic swimming	2	8	15	25
Water skiing	2	1	9	12
Wrestling	1	22	44	67
Swimming	1	7	45	53
Roller sports	1	3	5	9
Beach volleyball	1	3	2	6
Volleyball	1	1	6	8
Water polo	1	0	2	3
Golf	1	0	0	1
Basketball	0	5	1	6
Field hockey	0	1	2	3
Table tennis	0	1	2	3
Bodybuilding	0	1	0	1
Polo	0	1	0	1
Badminton	0	0	7	7
Baseball	0	0	5	5
Sambo	0	0	1	1
Softball	0	0	1	1
Totals (42 entries)	304	361	618	1,283

== Winter Pan American Games ==
Mexico participated in the first, and so far, only edition of the Winter Pan American Games in 1990 in Argentina. Mexico sent 4 athletes and only 8 countries participated. The competition was limited to 3 alpine skiing events due to the lack of snow. The following edition in 1993 was cancelled after the United States refused to compete without a full schedule of events, and the Winter Pan American Games have never been held again.

=== Medals by games ===
Games	Athletes	Gold	Silver	Bronze	Total
(Argentina) 1990 Las Leñas	4	0	0	0	0

== Junior Pan American Games ==
In 2019, Panam Sports created the Junior Pan American Games for athletes 21 years of age or younger in order to bridge a gap between junior and senior-level sports. Mexico has participated in both editions of the games.

=== Medals by games ===
Games	Athletes	Gold	Silver	Bronze	Total	Final Rank
(Colombia) 2021 Cali-Valle	357	46	78	48	172	4
(Paraguay) 2025 Asunción	377	29	45	55	129	4
(Argentina) 2029 Rosario	Future event					
Total	734	75	123	103	301	-
