= 1971 Pan American Games medal table =

- Location: Cali, Colombia

Highlights
- Most gold medals: United States (106)
- Most total medals: United States (223)

The 1971 Pan American Games, officially known as the VI Pan American Games, were a continental multi-sport event held in Cali, Colombia, from July 30 to August 13, 1971. At the Games, 2,935 athletes selected from 32 National Olympic Committees (NOCs) participated in events in 17 sports. Twenty nations earned medals during the competition, and fifteen won at least one gold medal.

== Medal table ==
The ranking in this table is based on medal counts published by several media organizations. By default, the table is ordered by the number of gold medals won by the athletes representing a nation. (In this context, a nation is an entity represented by an NOC). The number of silver medals is taken into consideration next and then the number of bronze medals. If nations are still tied, equal ranking is given and they are listed alphabetically by IOC country code.

* Host nation (Colombia)

Rank	Nation	Gold	Silver	Bronze	Total
1	United States	106	73	44	223
2	Cuba	29	51	25	105
3	Canada	20	20	39	79
4	Brazil	9	7	14	30
5	Mexico	6	12	23	41
6	Argentina	6	3	12	21
7	Colombia*	5	9	14	28
8	Jamaica	4	3	4	11
9	Puerto Rico	2	4	7	13
10	Venezuela	2	3	4	9
11	Netherlands Antilles	1	2	1	4
12	Trinidad and Tobago	1	1	6	8
13	Panama	1	1	4	6
14	Ecuador	1	0	2	3
15	Guatemala	1	0	0	1
16	Chile	0	3	5	8
17	Peru	0	1	4	5
18	Barbados	0	1	0	1
19	Uruguay	0	0	3	3
20	Guyana	0	0	1	1
Totals (20 entries)		194	194	212	600
