= Colombia at the Pan American Games =

- IOC code: COL
- NOC: Colombian Olympic Committee
- Website: www.olimpicocol.co (in Spanish)
- Medals Ranked 7th: Gold 164 Silver 210 Bronze 292 Total 666

Pan American Games appearances (overview)
- 1951; 1955; 1959; 1963; 1967; 1971; 1975; 1979; 1983; 1987; 1991; 1995; 1999; 2003; 2007; 2011; 2015; 2019; 2023

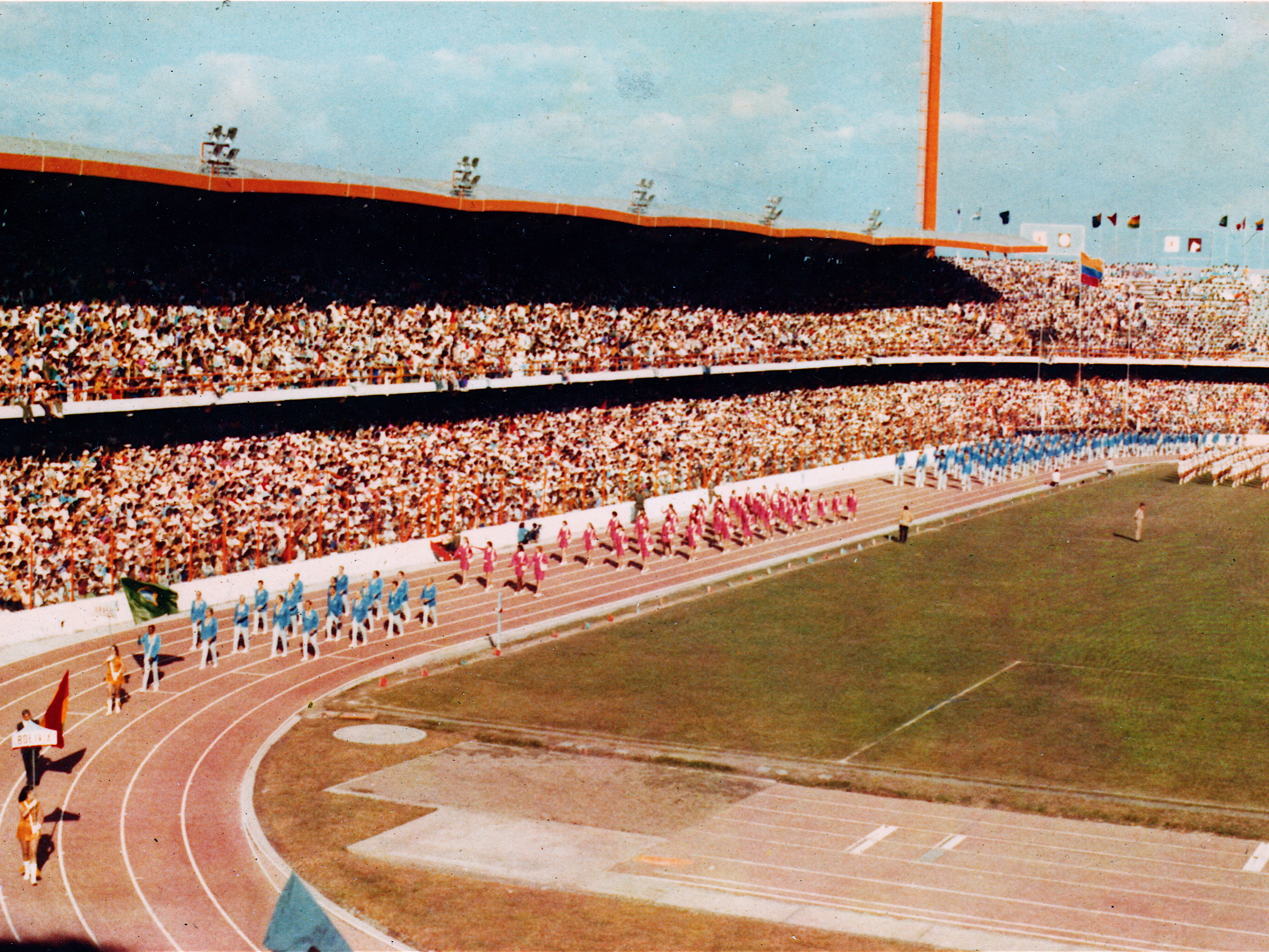
1971 Pan American Games Opening Ceremony, in Cali.

Colombia has participated in all editions of the Pan American games since its inception in 1951, except in 1959 and 1963. Hurdler Jaime Aparicio Rodewaldt won the country's first medal at the inaugural edition of the games in Buenos Aires 1951, a gold medal at the 400 m hurdles. The country is ranked seventh in the all-time Pan American games medal table. Cali, the capital of the Colombian department of Valle del Cauca, held the 1971 Pan American Games, and to date, the only time Colombia hosted the games. Its best performance was at the 2019 Edition in Lima, where it earned 28 golden medals, however, their best rank was at Toronto 2015 ranking fifth. The nation has won a total of 136 golden medals, and 568 overall, with weightlifting, roller skating, and cycling as the most successful sports.

== Pan American Games ==
=== Medals by games ===
Games	Athletes	Gold	Silver	Bronze	Total	Rank
(Argentina) 1951 Buenos Aires	–	1	0	0	1	10
1955 Mexico City	–	2	3	1	6	8
(United States) 1959 Chicago	did not participate					
(Brazil) 1963 São Paulo	did not participate					
(Canada) 1967 Winnipeg	–	1	2	5	8	9
(Colombia) 1971 Cali	–	5	9	14	28	7
1975 Mexico City	–	2	4	4	10	7
(Puerto Rico) 1979 San Juan	–	0	1	8	9	14
(Venezuela) 1983 Caracas	–	1	7	13	21	9
(United States) 1987 Indianapolis	–	3	8	13	24	8
(Cuba) 1991 Havana	–	5	15	21	41	7
(Argentina) 1995 Mar del Plata	–	5	15	28	48	8
(Canada) 1999 Winnipeg	168	7	17	18	42	7
(Dominican Republic) 2003 Santo Domingo	–	11	8	23	42	8
(Brazil) 2007 Rio de Janeiro	307	14	20	13	47	6
(Mexico) 2011 Guadalajara	284	24	25	35	84	6
(Canada) 2015 Toronto	294	27	14	31	72	5
(Peru) 2019 Lima	349	27	24	31	82	7
(Chile) 2023 Santiago	390	29	38	34	101	6
(Peru) 2027 Lima	Future event					
Total		164	210	292	666	7

=== Medals by sport ===
Leading in that sport

Sport	Gold	Silver	Bronze	Total
Weightlifting	38	42	38	118
Cycling	36	24	26	86
Roller sports	28	24	25	77
Athletics	14	20	35	69
Squash	8	5	10	23
Shooting	6	10	19	35
Gymnastics	5	8	11	24
Bowling	5	5	8	18
Boxing	4	12	17	33
Tennis	4	5	1	10
Archery	4	3	9	16
Golf	3	2	1	6
Surfing	3	0	0	3
Wrestling	1	12	23	36
Karate	1	6	8	15
Taekwondo	1	5	13	19
Diving	1	3	8	12
Football	1	2	1	4
Baseball	1	0	1	2
Judo	0	7	12	19
Fencing	0	2	8	10
Swimming	0	2	6	8
Water skiing	0	2	1	3
Basketball	0	2	0	2
Equestrian	0	1	4	5
Racquetball	0	1	3	4
Volleyball	0	1	1	2
Bodybuilding	0	1	0	1
Breaking	0	1	0	1
Sailing	0	1	0	1
Triathlon	0	1	0	1
Canoeing	0	0	1	1
Rugby sevens	0	0	1	1
Table tennis	0	0	1	1
Totals (34 entries)	164	210	292	666

== Winter Pan American Games ==
=== Medals by games ===
Games	Athletes	Gold	Silver	Bronze	Total	Rank
(Argentina) 1990 Las Leñas	1	0	0	0	0	—

== Parapan American Games ==
=== Medals by games ===
Colombia had participated in all editions of the Parapan American Games, since 1999. As of the 2015 edition, it ranks in the eighth place of the all-time medal table of the competition. The country has won 51 golden medals, and 193 overall.

Games	Athletes	Gold	Silver	Bronze	Total	Rank
1999 Mexico City	–	2	6	4	12	13
(Argentina) 2003 Mar del Plata	–	5	6	9	20	7
(Brazil) 2007 Rio de Janeiro	66	2	6	9	17	9
(Mexico) 2011 Guadalajara	107	18	23	13	54	6
(Canada) 2015 Toronto	140	24	36	30	90	5
(Peru) 2019 Lima	191	47	36	50	133	4
(Chile) 2023 Santiago	176	50	58	53	161	3
Total		148	171	168	487	6

== Junior Pan American Games ==
=== Medals by games ===
Games	Athletes	Gold	Silver	Bronze	Total	Rank
(Colombia) 2021 Cali-Valle	364	48	34	63	145	2
(Paraguay) 2025 Asunción	213	48	27	40	115	3
Total		96	61	103	260	3

=== Medals by sport ===
Leading in that sport

Sport	Gold	Silver	Bronze	Total
Cycling	27	11	8	46
Roller sports	22	2	4	28
Weightlifting	12	2	1	15
Athletics	9	11	14	34
Gymnastics	5	2	6	13
Swimming	4	9	17	30
Squash	4	4	4	12
Boxing	3	2	6	11
Wrestling	2	2	8	12
Tennis	2	0	0	2
Archery	1	4	4	9
Taekwondo	1	3	3	7
Judo	1	2	9	12
Bowling	1	1	2	4
3x3 basketball	1	0	0	1
Baseball	1	0	0	1
Diving	0	2	2	4
Water Skiing	0	2	1	3
Karate	0	1	7	8
Fencing	0	1	0	1
Artistic swimming	0	0	2	2
Table tennis	0	0	2	2
Canoeing	0	0	1	1
Golf	0	0	1	1
Rowing	0	0	1	1
Totals (25 entries)	96	61	103	260

== See also ==
- Colombia at the Olympics
- Colombia at the Paralympics
- Colombia at the Youth Olympics
