= 1967 Pan American Games medal table =

- Location: Winnipeg, Canada

Highlights
- Most gold medals: United States (115)
- Most total medals: United States (218)

The 1967 Pan American Games, officially known as the V Pan American Games, were a continental multi-sport event held in Winnipeg, Canada, from July 22 to August 7, 1967. At the Games, 2,361 athletes selected from 29 National Olympic Committees (NOCs) participated in events in 19 sports. Twenty-one nations earned medals during the competition, and eleven won at least one gold medal.

== Medal table ==
The ranking in this table is based on medal counts published by several media organizations. By default, the table is ordered by the number of gold medals won by the athletes representing a nation. (In this context, a nation is an entity represented by an NOC). The number of silver medals is taken into consideration next and then the number of bronze medals. If nations are still tied, equal ranking is given and they are listed alphabetically by IOC country code.

* Host nation (Canada)

Rank	Nation	Gold	Silver	Bronze	Total
1	United States	115	61	42	218
2	Canada*	12	33	38	83
3	Brazil	10	10	5	25
4	Cuba	8	14	24	46
5	Argentina	7	12	10	29
6	Mexico	5	14	21	40
7	Trinidad and Tobago	2	2	3	7
8	Venezuela	1	4	5	10
9	Colombia	1	2	5	8
10	Chile	1	1	3	5
10	Puerto Rico	1	1	3	5
12	Peru	0	2	1	3
13	Uruguay	0	1	4	5
14	Ecuador	0	1	2	3
14	Panama	0	1	2	3
16	Bermuda	0	1	1	2
17	Barbados	0	1	0	1
18	Jamaica	0	0	3	3
19	Guyana	0	0	1	1
19	Netherlands Antilles	0	0	1	1
Totals (20 entries)		163	161	174	498

== Notes ==
- ^a Some sources state that the United States actually achieved 120 gold medals, 63 silver medals and 42 bronze medals, despite the majority of reports counting 128, 69 and 47, respectively. This would result in a total of 225 medals earned by American athletes during the Games.
- ^b Some reports say that Canada earned 12 gold medals, 37 silver medals and 43 bronze medals, instead of 17, 39 and 50, respectively. This would result in a total of 92 medals earned by Canadian athletes during the Games.
- ^c According to some sources, Argentina achieved 13 silver medals and 11 bronze medals, instead of 14 and 12, respectively. This would result in a total of 30 medals earned by Argentinean athletes during the Games.
- ^d Some reports say that Cuba placed fourth in the medal table, ahead of Argentina and Mexico, after achieving 8 gold medals, 14 silver medals and 26 bronze medals. This would result in a total of 48 medals earned by Cuban athletes during the Games.
