= United States at the Pan American Games =

- IOC code: USA
- NOC: United States Olympic & Paralympic Committee
- Website: www.teamusa.org
- Medals Ranked 1st: Gold 2,192 Silver 1,619 Bronze 1,199 Total 5,010

Pan American Games appearances (overview)
- 1951; 1955; 1959; 1963; 1967; 1971; 1975; 1979; 1983; 1987; 1991; 1995; 1999; 2003; 2007; 2011; 2015; 2019; 2023

The United States of America (USA) has sent athletes to every celebration of the Pan American Games. The United States Olympic & Paralympic Committee (USOPC) is the National Olympic Committee for the United States.

American athletes have won a total of 4999 medals at the Pan American Games, 11 at the Winter Pan American Games (which have been staged only once). Which brings their total medal tally to 5010. Also American athletes have won 266 medals at the Junior Pan American Games.

== Hosted Games ==
The United States has hosted the Pan American Games on two occasions:

Games	Host city	Dates
1959 Pan American Games	Chicago, Illinois	August 27 – September 7
1987 Pan American Games	Indianapolis, Indiana	August 8 – August 23

== Pan American Games ==
=== Medals by games ===
Games	Gold	Silver	Bronze	Total	Gold medals	Total medals
(Argentina) 1951 Buenos Aires	46	34	21	101	2	2
1955 Mexico City	81	58	38	177	1	1
(United States) 1959 Chicago	121	75	56	252	1	1
(Brazil) 1963 São Paulo	106	56	37	199	1	1
(Canada) 1967 Winnipeg	120/128	63/69	42/47	225/244	1	1
(Colombia) 1971 Cali	105	73/74	40/39	218	1	1
1975 Mexico City	117	82	47/48	246/247	1	1
(Puerto Rico) 1979 San Juan	126	95	45	266	1	1
(Venezuela) 1983 Caracas	137/148	92/101	56/53	285/302	1	1
(United States) 1987 Indianapolis	168/169	118/120	83/81	369/370	1	1
(Cuba) 1991 Havana	130	125	97	352	2	1
(Argentina) 1995 Mar del Plata	170	145	110	425	1	1
(Canada) 1999 Winnipeg	106	110/119	80/79	296/304	1	1
(Dominican Republic) 2003 Santo Domingo	117	80	73	270	1	1
(Brazil) 2007 Rio de Janeiro	97	88	52	237	1	1
(Mexico) 2011 Guadalajara	92	79	66	237	1	1
(Canada) 2015 Toronto	103	82	80	265	1	1
(Peru) 2019 Lima	122	87	84	293	1	1
(Chile) 2023 Santiago	124	75	87	286	1	1
(Peru) 2027 Lima	Future event					
Total	2188	1617	1194	4999	1	1

=== Medals by sport ===
As of the conclusion of the 2023 Pan American Games

Leading in that sport

Sport	Gold	Silver	Bronze	Total
Swimming	370	269	149	788
Athletics	300	247	183	730
Shooting	242	145	72	459
Wrestling	151	70	49	270
Artistic gymnastics	132	111	94	337
Fencing	88	60	41	189
Weightlifting	81	74	55	210
Rowing	65	64	31	160
Archery	60	43	12	115
Equestrian	52	34	20	106
Diving	40	42	43	125
Roller speed skating	40	31	27	98
Sailing	39	34	25	98
Boxing	37	37	51	125
Judo	32	30	56	118
Water skiing	32	17	14	63
Track cycling	31	26	17	74
Artistic swimming	28	11	5	44
Tennis	27	14	22	63
Bowling	26	7	9	42
Rhythmic gymnastics	25	25	21	71
Table tennis	25	12	18	55
Canoe sprint	23	14	15	52
Taekwondo	21	12	24	57
Water polo	20	5	1	26
Artistic roller skating	18	17	3	38
Road cycling	17	9	7	33
Karate	17	6	14	37
Racquetball	16	12	12	40
Basketball	15	9	6	30
Modern pentathlon	13	10	7	30
Badminton	11	11	18	40
Squash	11	10	11	32
Softball	10	10	0	20
Trampoline gymnastics	8	8	5	21
Slalom canoeing	8	3	3	14
Sambo	7	8	0	15
Volleyball	6	9	5	20
Triathlon	6	7	2	15
Mountain biking	6	4	3	13
Marathon swimming	6	4	1	11
Sport climbing	4	4	1	9
BMX racing	4	3	1	8
Surfing	4	1	2	7
3x3 basketball	4	0	0	4
Handball	3	0	2	5
Baseball	2	11	3	16
Field hockey	2	6	7	15
Golf	2	2	1	5
Football	2	1	3	6
Roller hockey	2	1	1	4
BMX freestyle	2	0	1	3
Rugby	1	2	3	6
Beach volleyball	1	2	1	4
Breaking	1	1	1	3
Skateboarding	1	0	2	3
Basque pelota	0	4	1	5
Totals (57 entries)	2,197	1,609	1,181	4,987

== Winter Pan American Games ==
=== Medals by games ===
Games	Gold	Silver	Bronze	Total	Gold medals	Total medals
(Argentina) 1990 Las Leñas	4	2	5	11	1	1
Total	4	2	5	11	1	1

=== Medals by sport ===
Leading in that sport

Sport	Gold	Silver	Bronze	Total
Alpine skiing	4	2	5	11
Totals (1 entries)	4	2	5	11

== Junior Pan American Games ==
=== Medals by games ===
Games	Gold	Silver	Bronze	Total	Gold medals	Total medals
(Colombia) 2021 Cali-Valle	47	29	38	114	3	4
(Paraguay) 2025 Asunción	54	42	46	142	2	2
Total	101	71	84	256	2	4
