= 1983 Pan American Games medal table =

- Location: Caracas, Venezuela

Highlights
- Most gold medals: United States (141) ^{a}
- Most total medals: United States (293) ^{a}

The 1983 Pan American Games, officially known as the IX Pan American Games, were a continental multi-sport event held in Caracas, Venezuela, from 12 to 29 August1983. At the Games, 3,426 athletes selected from 36 National Olympic Committees (NOCs) participated in events in 22 sports. Twenty-one nations earned medals during the competition, including 13 that won at least one gold medal.

== Medal table ==
The ranking in this table is based on medal counts published by several media organizations. By default, the table is ordered by the number of gold medals won by the athletes representing a nation. (In this context, a nation is an entity represented by an NOC). The number of silver medals is taken into consideration next and then the number of bronze medals. If nations are still tied, equal ranking is given and they are listed alphabetically by IOC country code.

^{1}	Host nation

To sort this table by nation, total medal count, or any other column, click on the icon next to the column title.

Rank	Nation	Gold	Silver	Bronze	Total
1	United States ^{a}	141	100	52	293
2	Cuba ^{b}	79/78/80	53/51/49	43/45	175/174
3	Canada ^{c}	21	40	60	121
4	Brazil	14	20	23	57
5	Venezuela ^{1} ^{d}	12/14	26/25	35/37	73/76
6	Mexico	7	11	24	42
7	Argentina	2	11	22	35
8	Puerto Rico	2	7	6	15
9	Colombia	1	7	13	21
10	Chile	1	3	9	13
11	Peru	1	1	4	6
12	Uruguay	1	0	2	3
13	Ecuador	1	0	0	1
14	Dominican Republic	0	7	7	14
15	Trinidad and Tobago	0	1	2	3
16	Bahamas	0	1	0	1
16	Guatemala	0	1	0	1
16	Nicaragua	0	1	0	1
19	Jamaica	0	0	6	6
20	Belize	0	0	1	1
20	Panama	0	0	1	1
Total		276/292/294	286/290/288	303/312	865/894

== Notes ==
- ^a Some sources state that the United States actually achieved 148 gold medals, 101 silver medals and 53 bronze medals, while others count 137, 92 and 56, respectively. This would result in a total of 302 medals earned by American athletes during the Games.
- ^b Some reports say that Cuba earned 78 gold medals, 51 silver medals and 45 bronze medals, instead of 79, 53 and 43, respectively. This would result in a total of 176 medals for the nation. According to another source, they won 80 gold medals, 49 silver medals and 45 bronze medals. This would result in a total of 174 medals earned by Cuban athletes during the Games.
- ^c Some sources state that Canada achieved 22 gold medals, 42 silver medals and 55 bronze medals, instead of 18, 44 and 47, respectively. This would result in a total of 119 medals earned by Canadian athletes during the Games.
- ^d Some reports say that Venezuela placed fourth in the medal table, ahead of Brazil, after achieving 14 gold medals, 25 silver medals and 37 bronze medals. This would result in a total of 76 medals earned by Venezuelan athletes during the Games. However, the Brazilian Olympic Committee (BOC) confirms that Brazil placed fourth.
