= 1987 Pan American Games medal table =

1991 Pan American Games medal table
- Location: Indianapolis, United States

Highlights
- Most gold medals: United States (169) ^{a}
- Most total medals: United States (370) ^{a}

The 1987 Pan American Games, officially known as the X Pan American Games, were a continental multi-sport event held in Indianapolis, United States, from 7 to 23 August 1987. At the Games, 4,453 athletes selected from 38 National Olympic Committees (NOCs) participated in events in 27 sports. Twenty-seven nations earned medals during the competition, and fourteen won at least one gold medal.

== Medal table ==
The ranking in this table is based on medal counts published by several media organizations. By default, the table is ordered by the number of gold medals won by the athletes representing a nation. (In this context, a nation is an entity represented by an NOC). The number of silver medals is taken into consideration next and then the number of bronze medals. If nations are still tied, equal ranking is given and they are listed alphabetically by IOC country code.

^{1}	Host nation

To sort this table by nation, total medal count, or any other column, click on the icon next to the column title.

Rank	Nation	Gold	Silver	Bronze	Total
1	United States ^{1} ^{a}	169/168	120/118	81/83	370/369
2	Cuba	75	52	48	175
3	Canada ^{b}	30	56/57	75	161/162
4	Brazil	14	14	33	61
5	Argentina	12	14	22	48
6	Mexico	9	11	18	38
7	Venezuela	3	12	12	27
8	Colombia	3	8	13	24
9	Puerto Rico	3	6	20	29
10	Costa Rica	3	4	4	11
11	Jamaica	2	3	8	13
12	Uruguay	2	2	3	7
13	Chile	1	2	4	7
14	Suriname	1	0	1	2
15	Peru	0	4	2	6
16	Dominican Republic	0	3	9	12
17	Panama	0	3	1	4
18	Bahamas	0	2	3	5
19	Ecuador	0	1	5	6
20	Virgin Islands	0	1	1	2
20	Trinidad and Tobago	0	1	1	2
22	Guatemala	0	0	2	2
23	Netherlands Antilles	0	0	1	1
23	Bermuda	0	0	1	1
23	El Salvador	0	0	1	1
23	Guyana	0	0	1	1
23	Paraguay	0	0	1	1
Total ^{c}		327/326	319/318	373/375	1,019

== Notes ==
- ^a Some sources state that the United States earned 168 gold medals, 118 silver medals, and 83 bronze medals, instead of 169, 120, and 81, respectively. This would result in a total of 369 medals for the United States.
- ^b Some sources state that Canada earned 57 bronze medals, instead of 56. This would result in a total of 162 medals for the nation.
- ^c Therefore, according to some sources, 326 gold medals, 318 silver medals and 375 bronze medals were awarded during the Games, instead of 327, 319 and 373, respectively. This would result in the same total number of 1019 medals awarded.
