= 1951 Pan American Games medal table =

- Location: Buenos Aires, Argentina

Highlights
- Most gold medals: Argentina (63)
- Most total medals: Argentina (142)

The 1951 Pan American Games, officially known as the I Pan American Games, were a continental multi-sport event held in Buenos Aires, Argentina, from February 5 to March 9, 1951. At the Games, 2,513 athletes selected from 21 National Olympic Committees (NOCs) participated in events in 18 sports. Seventeen nations earned medals during the competition, and ten won at least one gold medal.

== Medal table ==
The ranking in this table is based on medal counts published by several media organizations. By default, the table is ordered by the number of gold medals won by the athletes representing a nation. (In this context, a nation is an entity represented by a NOC). The number of silver medals is taken into consideration next and then the number of bronze medals. If nations are still tied, equal ranking is given and they are listed alphabetically by IOC country code.

To sort this table by nation, total medal count, or any other column, click on the icon next to the column title.

== Medal count ==
* Host nation (Argentina)

Rank	NOC	Gold	Silver	Bronze	Total
1	Argentina	63	43	36	142
2	United States	46	34	21	101
3	Chile	8	19	12	39
4	Cuba	6	7	8	21
5	Brazil	5	15	13	33
6	Mexico	5	7	23	35
7	Peru	2	5	7	14
8	Trinidad and Tobago	1	2	0	3
9	Ecuador	1	0	1	2
10	Colombia	1	0	0	1
11	Venezuela	0	1	1	2
12	Costa Rica	0	1	0	1
13	Guatemala	0	0	3	3
13	Jamaica	0	0	3	3
15	Haiti	0	0	1	1
15	Panama	0	0	1	1
Totals (16 entries)		138	134	130	402

== Notes ==
- ^a Some sources appoint that Argentina achieved 47 silver medals and 39 bronze medals, despite the majority of reports counting 44 and 38, respectively. This would result in a total of 154 medals earned by Argentinean athletes during the Games.
- ^b Some reports say that the United States earned 46 gold medals and 19 bronze medals, instead of 44 and 18, respectively. This would result in a total of 98 medals earned by American athletes during the Games.
- ^c Some sources appoint that Chile achieved, in fact, 8 gold medals and 19 silver medals, despite many reports counting 9 and 20, respectively. This would result in a total of 39 medals earned by Chilean athletes during the Games and would put the country in fourth place, behind Cuba.
