= Equestrian events at the Pan American Games =

- No. of events: 6 (mixed)

Equestrianism made its Pan American Games debut at the first Pan American Games in 1951 in Buenos Aires, Argentina. It has appeared at every Pan American Games since. The current Pan American Games equestrian disciplines are Dressage, Eventing, and Jumping. In each discipline, both individual and team medals are awarded. Women and men compete together on equal terms.

Equestrian disciplines and the equestrian component of Modern Pentathlon are also the only Pan American Games events that involve animals. The horse is considered as much an athlete as the rider.

The international governing body for equestrian sports is the Fédération Équestre Internationale (FEI).

== Editions ==
Games	Year	Host city	Best nation
IX	1983	Caracas, Venezuela	United States
X	1987	Indianapolis, US	Canada
XI	1991	Havana, Cuba	Canada
XII	1995	Buenos Aires, Argentina	United States
XIII	1999	Winnipeg, Canada	United States
XIV	2003	Santo Domingo, Dominican Republic	United States
XV	2007	Rio de Janeiro, Brazil	United States
XVI	2011	Guadalajara, Mexico	United States
XVII	2015	Toronto, Canada	United States
XVIII	2019	Lima, Peru	United States
XIX	2023	Santiago, Chile	United States

== Eventing ==
In 1991 in Havana and 2003 in Santo Domingo the eventing competition were not held. Rather, a Pan American Eventing Championship was held in Chatsworth, Georgia, United States in 1991 and in 2003 the competition was held in Fair Hill in 2003.

== Medal table ==
Some events did not have silver and/or bronze medalists.

Rank	Nation	Gold	Silver	Bronze	Total
1	United States	52	34	20	106
2	Canada	21	23	15	59
3	Brazil	9	10	17	36
4	Mexico	7	10	17	34
5	Chile	7	6	13	26
6	Argentina	2	12	2	16
7	Bermuda	1	0	1	2
8	Ecuador	1	0	0	1
8	Puerto Rico	1	0	0	1
10	Colombia	0	1	4	5
11	Venezuela	0	1	1	2
12	Dominican Republic	0	0	2	2
Totals (12 entries)		101	97	92	290
