= Basque pelota at the Pan American Games =

- No. of events: 10 (men: 6; women: 4)

Basque pelota was contested at the Pan American Games in 1995, 2003, 2011, 2019 and 2023.

== Medal table ==
Rank	Nation	Gold	Silver	Bronze	Total
1	Mexico	22	8	7	37
2	Argentina	13	6	10	29
3	Cuba	2	13	10	25
4	Peru	2	0	1	3
5	Uruguay	1	6	2	9
6	United States	0	4	1	5
7	Venezuela	0	3	1	4
8	Chile	0	0	6	6
9	Brazil	0	0	2	2
Totals (9 entries)		40	40	40	120
