= Water skiing at the Pan American Games =

- No. of events: 10 (men: 5; women: 5)

Water Skiing has been contested at the Pan American Games since in 1995, without ever leaving the program.

== Medal table ==
Rank	Nation	Gold	Silver	Bronze	Total
1	United States	32	17	14	63
2	Canada	19	33	12	64
3	Argentina	5	3	14	22
4	Chile	2	6	11	19
5	Mexico	2	1	9	12
6	Peru	2	0	0	2
7	Brazil	1	1	2	4
8	Dominican Republic	1	1	0	2
9	Colombia	0	2	1	3
10	Venezuela	0	0	1	1
Totals (10 entries)		64	64	64	192
