= All-time Pan American Games medal table =

An all-time medal table for all Pan American Games from 1951 to 2023 is tabulated below. PASO (Panam Sports) itself does not publish all-time tables, and publishes unofficial tables only per single Games. This table was thus compiled by adding up single entries from the PASO database.

The results are attributed to the IOC country code as currently displayed by the IOC database. Usually, a single code corresponds to a single National Olympic Committee (NOC). When different codes are displayed for different years, medal counts are combined in the case of a simple change of IOC code (such as from TRT to TRI for Trinidad and Tobago) or simple change of country name (such as from British Honduras to Belize). As the medals are attributed to each NOC, not all totals include medals won by athletes from that country for another NOC, such as before independence of that country (see individual footnotes for special cases such as combined teams). Names in italic are national entities that no longer exist. The 2023 Pan American Games started on October 20 and concluded on November 5.

== NOCs ==
The table is pre-sorted by the name of each Olympic Committee, but can be displayed as sorted by any other column, such as the total number of gold medals or total number of overall medals. To sort by gold, silver, and then bronze (as used unofficially by the IOC) and by most broadcasters outside the US and Canada sort first by the bronze column, then the silver, and then the gold. The National Olympic Committee of the Netherlands Antilles and Independent Athletes Team at the 2023 Pan American Games are listed in italics because they are NOCs that no longer exist.

	Summer Pan American Games					Winter Pan American Games					Combined Total				
Team (IOC code)	№	1st place, gold medalist(s)	2nd place, silver medalist(s)	3rd place, bronze medalist(s)	Total	№	1st place, gold medalist(s)	2nd place, silver medalist(s)	3rd place, bronze medalist(s)	Total	№	1st place, gold medalist(s)	2nd place, silver medalist(s)	3rd place, bronze medalist(s)	Total
Antigua and Barbuda	12	1	3	5	9	0	0	0	0	0	12	1	3	5	9
Argentina	19	343	391	501	1235	1	0	0	0	0	20	343	391	501	1235
Aruba	10	0	2	2	4	0	0	0	0	0	10	0	2	2	4
Bahamas	18	9	15	15	39	0	0	0	0	0	18	9	15	15	39
Barbados	16	1	4	13	18	0	0	0	0	0	16	1	4	13	18
Belize	15	0	0	2	2	0	0	0	0	0	15	0	0	2	2
Bermuda	15	1	6	5	12	0	0	0	0	0	16	1	6	5	12
Bolivia	15	3	5	10	18	1	0	0	0	0	16	3	5	10	18
Brazil	19	449	476	656	1581	1	0	0	0	0	20	449	476	656	1581
British Virgin Islands	11	1	0	0	1	0	0	0	0	0	11	1	0	0	1
Canada	18	537	776	918	2231	1	2	4	1	7	19	539	780	919	2238
Cayman Islands	12	1	4	1	6	0	0	0	0	0	12	1	4	1	6
Chile	19	69	141	205	415	1	0	0	0	0	20	69	141	205	415
Colombia	19	164	209	296	669	1	0	0	0	0	20	164	209	296	669
Costa Rica	19	6	7	17	30	0	0	0	0	0	19	6	7	17	30
Cuba	19	938	642	613	2193	0	0	0	0	0	19	938	642	613	2193
Dominica	8	0	2	2	4	0	0	0	0	0	8	0	2	2	4
Dominican Republic	19	48	82	150	280	0	0	0	0	0	19	48	82	150	280
Ecuador	19	45	49	84	178	0	0	0	0	0	19	45	49	84	178
El Salvador	19	5	9	18	32	0	0	0	0	0	19	5	9	18	32
Grenada	10	1	3	2	6	0	0	0	0	0	10	1	3	2	6
Guatemala	18	22	24	48	94	0	0	0	0	0	18	22	24	48	94
Guyana	17	2	5	14	21	0	0	0	0	0	17	2	5	14	21
Haiti	18	0	3	7	10	0	0	0	0	0	18	0	3	7	10
Honduras	13	0	3	6	9	0	0	0	0	0	13	0	3	6	9
Independent Athletes Team	1	3	4	5	12	0	0	0	0	0	1	3	4	5	12
Jamaica	19	32	48	75	155	0	0	0	0	0	19	32	48	75	155
Mexico	19	310	362	617	1289	1	0	0	0	0	20	310	362	617	1289
Netherlands Antilles	15	5	9	17	31	0	0	0	0	0	15	5	9	17	31
Nicaragua	19	0	6	10	16	0	0	0	0	0	19	0	6	10	16
Panama	18	5	23	41	69	0	0	0	0	0	18	5	23	41	69
Paraguay	10	2	5	15	22	0	0	0	0	0	10	2	5	15	22
Peru	19	29	46	105	180	0	0	0	0	0	19	29	46	105	180
Puerto Rico	19	36	91	158	285	0	0	0	0	0	19	36	91	158	285
Saint Lucia	8	2	0	3	5	0	0	0	0	0	8	2	0	3	5
Saint Kitts and Nevis	7	0	2	2	4	0	0	0	0	0	7	0	2	2	4
Saint Vincent and the Grenadines	8	0	0	2	2	0	0	0	0	0	8	0	0	2	2
Suriname	13	3	3	5	11	0	0	0	0	0	13	3	3	5	11
Trinidad and Tobago	18	12	23	31	66	0	0	0	0	0	18	22	23	31	66
United States	19	2188	1617	1194	4999	1	4	2	5	11	20	2192	1619	1199	5010
Uruguay	19	14	31	52	97	0	0	0	0	0	19	14	31	52	97
Virgin Islands	15	0	4	5	9	0	0	0	0	0	15	0	4	5	9
Venezuela	19	110	235	317	662	0	0	0	0	0	19	110	235	317	662
Totals	19	5403	5372	6249	17024	1	6	6	6	18	20	5409	5378	6255	17030

== Ranked medal table ==
Rank	Nation	Gold	Silver	Bronze	Total
1	United States	2,192	1,619	1,199	5,010
2	Cuba	938	642	613	2,193
3	Canada	539	776	918	2,233
4	Brazil	449	476	656	1,581
5	Argentina	343	391	501	1,235
6	Mexico	310	362	617	1,289
7	Colombia	164	210	292	666
8	Venezuela	110	235	317	662
9	Chile	69	141	205	415
10	Dominican Republic	48	82	150	280
11	Ecuador	45	49	84	178
12	Puerto Rico	36	91	158	285
13	Jamaica	32	48	75	155
14	Peru	29	46	105	180
15	Guatemala	22	24	48	94
16	Uruguay	14	31	52	97
17	Trinidad and Tobago	12	23	31	66
18	Bahamas	9	15	15	39
19	Costa Rica	6	7	17	30
20	Panama	5	23	41	69
21	El Salvador	5	9	18	32
22	Netherlands Antilles	5	9	17	31
23	Bolivia	3	5	10	18
24	Independent Athletes Team	3	4	5	12
25	Suriname	3	3	5	11
26	Paraguay	2	5	15	22
27	Guyana	2	5	14	21
28	Saint Lucia	2	0	3	5
29	Bermuda	1	6	5	12
30	Barbados	1	4	13	18
31	Cayman Islands	1	4	1	6
32	Antigua and Barbuda	1	3	5	9
33	Grenada	1	3	2	6
34	British Virgin Islands	1	0	0	1
35	Nicaragua	0	6	10	16
36	Virgin Islands	0	4	5	9
37	Haiti	0	3	7	10
38	Honduras	0	3	6	9
39	Aruba	0	2	2	4
39	Dominica	0	2	2	4
39	Saint Kitts and Nevis	0	2	2	4
42	Belize	0	0	2	2
42	Saint Vincent and the Grenadines	0	0	2	2
Totals (43 entries)		5,403	5,373	6,245	17,021

== See also ==
- All-time Olympic Games medal table
- All-time Paralympic Games medal table
- All-time Youth Olympic Games medal table
- All-time FISU World University Games medal table
- All-time European Games medal table
- All-time Asian Games medal table
- All-time African Games medal table
- All-time Pacific Games medal table
- All-time Commonwealth Games medal table
- All-time World Games medal table
