= Cuba at the Pan American Games =

- IOC code: CUB
- NOC: Cuban Olympic Committee
- Medals Ranked 2nd: Gold 938 Silver 643 Bronze 614 Total 2,195

Pan American Games appearances (overview)
- 1951; 1955; 1959; 1963; 1967; 1971; 1975; 1979; 1983; 1987; 1991; 1995; 1999; 2003; 2007; 2011; 2015; 2019; 2023

Cuba at the Pan American Games.

== Pan American Games ==
=== Medals by games ===
| Games | Gold | Silver | Bronze | Total | Gold medals | Total medals |
| (Argentina) 1951 Buenos Aires | 9 | 9 | 10 | 28 | 4 | 6 |
| 1955 Mexico City | 1 | 6 | 6 | 13 | 9 | 7 |
| (United States) 1959 Chicago | 2 | 4 | 4 | 10 | 8 | 9 |
| (Brazil) 1963 São Paulo | 4 | 6 | 4 | 14 | 5 | 7 |
| (Canada) 1967 Winnipeg | 8 | 14 | 24 | 46 | 4 | 3 |
| (Colombia) 1971 Cali | 31 | 49 | 25 | 105 | 2 | 2 |
| 1975 Mexico City | 56 | 45 | 33 | 134 | 2 | 2 |
| (Puerto Rico) 1979 San Juan | 64 | 47 | 34 | 145 | 2 | 2 |
| (Venezuela) 1983 Caracas | 79 | 53 | 43 | 175 | 2 | 2 |
| (United States) 1987 Indianapolis | 75 | 52 | 48 | 175 | 2 | 2 |
| (Cuba) 1991 Havana | 140 | 62 | 63 | 265 | 1 | 2 |
| (Argentina) 1995 Mar del Plata | 112 | 66 | 60 | 238 | 2 | 2 |
| (Canada) 1999 Winnipeg | 70 | 40 | 47 | 157 | 2 | 3 |
| (Dominican Republic) 2003 Santo Domingo | 72 | 41 | 39 | 152 | 2 | 2 |
| (Brazil) 2007 Rio de Janeiro | 59 | 35 | 41 | 135 | 2 | 4 |
| (Mexico) 2011 Guadalajara | 58 | 35 | 43 | 136 | 2 | 3 |
| (Canada) 2015 Toronto | 36 | 27 | 34 | 97 | 4 | 4 |
| (Peru) 2019 Lima | 33 | 28 | 39 | 100 | 6 | 5 |
| (Chile) 2023 Santiago | 30 | 22 | 17 | 69 | 5 | 8 |
| (Peru) 2027 Lima | Future event | | | | | |
| Total | 938 | 642 | 613 | 2193 | 2 | 2 |

== Junior Pan American Games ==
=== Medals by games ===
| Games | Gold | Silver | Bronze | Total | Gold medals | Total medals |
| (Colombia) 2021 Cali-Valle | 29 | 19 | 22 | 70 | 5th | 5th |
| (Paraguay) 2025 Asunción | Future event | | | | | |
| Total | 29 | 19 | 22 | 70 | 5th | 5th |
