= Polo at 1951 Pan American Games =

Polo at the 1951 Pan American Games

Polo was held once at the Pan American Games, in 1951 the first edition of the games.

== Men's participating nations ==
Nation	1951	Years
Argentina	1st place, gold medalist(s)	1
Mexico	2nd place, silver medalist(s)	1
Peru	3rd place, bronze medalist(s)	1
Colombia	4th	1
Nations	4	

YEAR / HOST	GOLD	SILVER	BRONZE
1951 Buenos Aires	Argentina	Mexico	Peru
