= 1955 Pan American Games =

2nd edition of the Pan American Games

II Pan American Games
- Poster of the 1955 Pan American Games.
- Host: Mexico City, Mexico
- Nations: 22
- Athletes: 2,583
- Events: 146 in 17 sports
- Opening: March 12
- Closing: March 26
- Opened by: President Adolfo Ruiz Cortines
- Main venue: Estadio Olímpico Universitario

The 1955 Pan American Games, officially known as II Pan American Games (Spanish: II Juegos Panamericanos) and commonly known as Mexico 1955 (Spanish: México 1955), opened on March 12, 1955, at University Stadium in Mexico City, Mexico, in front of a capacity crowd of 100,000 spectators.

A total of 2,583 athletes from 22 nations marched in review and formed ranks upon the infield. The nations paraded into the stadium in Spanish alphabetical order: Argentina, Bahamas, Brazil, Canada, Colombia, Costa Rica, Cuba, Chile, El Salvador, United States, Guatemala, Haiti, Jamaica, Netherlands Antilles, Panama, Paraguay, Puerto Rico, Dominican Republic, Trinidad and Tobago, Uruguay, Venezuela, and Mexico. The hot sun, combined with the high altitude, caused two members of the U.S. team to collapse. Both quickly recovered.

== Host city selection ==
On March 6, 1951, the Pan American Sports Organization (PASO) selected Mexico City over Guatemala City to host the II Pan American Games. Seventeen of the eighteen countries participated in the vote, with El Salvador abstaining. Guatemala City received two votes, one from Guatemala and one from Mexico, and Mexico City received the remaining fifteen votes.

== Medal table ==
* Host nation (Mexico)

Rank	MEX	Gold	Silver	Bronze	Total
1	United States	81	58	38	177
2	Argentina	27	32	17	76
3	Mexico*	18	10	31	59
4	Chile	4	7	13	24
5	Canada	4	4	3	11
6	Venezuela	2	5	9	16
7	Brazil	2	3	12	17
8	Colombia	2	3	1	6
9	Cuba	1	4	8	13
10	Panama	1	1	0	2
11	Guatemala	1	0	1	2
12	Dominican Republic	1	0	0	1
13	Uruguay	0	6	2	8
14	Puerto Rico	0	2	2	4
15	Jamaica	0	2	1	3
16	Netherlands Antilles	0	1	2	3
17	Trinidad and Tobago	0	1	1	2
Totals (17 entries)		144	139	141	424

== Sports ==
- Athletics (29)
- Baseball (1)
- Basketball (2)
- Boxing (10)
- Cycling
  - Road (2)
  - Track (3)
- Diving (8)
- Equestrian (5)
- Fencing (7)
- Football (1)
- Gymnastics
  - Artistic (12)
- Modern pentathlon (2)
- Rowing (5)
- Shooting (16)
- Swimming (21)
- Synchronized swimming (3)
- Tennis (5)
- Volleyball (2)
- Water polo (1)
- Weightlifting (7)
- Wrestling (8)

Preceded by Buenos Aires	II Pan American Games; Mexico City (1955)	Succeeded by Chicago
