= Alpine skiing at the Pan American Games =

- No. of events: 6 (men: 3; women: 3)

Alpine skiing at the Pan American Games was only held at the 1990 Winter Pan American Games in Las Leñas, Argentina.

== Medal table ==
Rank	Nation	Gold	Silver	Bronze	Total
1	United States	4	2	5	11
2	Canada	2	4	1	7
Totals (2 entries)		6	6	6	18

== See also ==
- 1990 Winter Pan American Games
