= 2019 Pan American Games medal table =

- Location: Lima, Peru

Highlights
- Most gold medals: United States (122)
- Most total medals: United States (293)

The 2019 Pan American Games medal table is a list of National Olympic Committees (NOCs) ranked by the number of gold medals won by their athletes during the 2019 Pan American Games, held in Lima, Peru, from July 26 to August 11, 2019. Approximately 6,650 athletes from 41 NOCs participated in 419 events in 39 sports.

The United States topped the medal count with 122 gold and 293 overall medals, its best result in the 21st century. Brazil pulled off its best performance in history, winning 54 gold and 169 overall medals, and finishing second in the standings. Mexico (37 golds) edged Canada (35), Argentina (33), and Cuba (33) in the battle for third place. The Canadians, however, won the most total medals among the three, 152. For Cuba, it was their worst result in terms of gold medals since 1971. For Chile, it was their best result in history in terms of gold and total medals.

== Medal table ==
The ranking in this table is based on information provided by Panam Sports and is consistent with the convention used in its published medal tables. By default, the table is ordered by the number of gold medals an athlete's nation has won (in this context, a "nation" is an entity represented by a National Olympic Committee). The number of silver medals is considered next, followed by the number of bronze medals. If nations are still tied, equal ranking is given, and they are listed alphabetically by IOC country code.

In badminton, boxing, judo, karate, racquetball, taekwondo, table tennis, and wrestling, two bronze medals will be awarded for each event. Also, in bowling, fencing, and squash, two bronze medals will be awarded in some events. Therefore, the total number of bronze medals will be greater than the total number of gold or silver medals. The following is the medal table maintained by the official website of the games.

The British Virgin Islands won its first-ever gold medal and its first-ever Pan American Games medal after Chantel Malone won the women's long jump athletics event. Aruba also earned its first medal in the history of the Pan American Games, a bronze medal won by sailor Mack van den Eerenbeemt in men's RS:X. This means that all current participating countries have now won at least one medal.

Barbados, Bolivia, Grenada, and Paraguay also won their first-ever gold medals at the Pan American Games.

* Host nation (Peru)

Rank	Nation	Gold	Silver	Bronze	Total
1	United States	122	87	84	293
2	Brazil	54	45	70	169
3	Mexico	37	39	62	138
4	Canada	35	65	52	152
5	Argentina	33	33	34	100
6	Cuba	33	28	39	100
7	Colombia	27	24	31	82
8	Chile	13	19	18	50
9	Dominican Republic	11	12	17	40
10	Peru*	11	7	23	41
11	Ecuador	10	7	15	32
12	Venezuela	9	14	20	43
13	Jamaica	6	6	7	19
14	Puerto Rico	5	5	14	24
15	El Salvador	3	0	1	4
16	Guatemala	2	9	8	19
17	Trinidad and Tobago	1	7	3	11
18	Paraguay	1	3	1	5
19	Bolivia	1	2	2	5
20	Grenada	1	1	0	2
21	Costa Rica	1	0	4	5
22	Saint Lucia	1	0	1	2
23	Barbados	1	0	0	1
23	British Virgin Islands	1	0	0	1
25	Uruguay	0	4	4	8
26	Antigua and Barbuda	0	1	2	3
27	Honduras	0	1	1	2
28	Panama	0	0	4	4
29	Nicaragua	0	0	3	3
30	Aruba	0	0	1	1
30	Bahamas	0	0	1	1
Totals (31 entries)		419	419	522	1,360

== Changes in medal standings ==
Ruling date	Sport/Event	Athlete (NOC)	1st place, gold medalist(s)	2nd place, silver medalist(s)	3rd place, bronze medalist(s)	Total	Comment
List of official changes in medal standings (during the Games)
11 August 2019	Bowling; Men's doubles	Puerto Rico DSQ	−1			−1	Jean Pérez Faure, a member of the Puerto Rican team who won the gold medal in the men's doubles has tested positive for doping with chlorthalidone, a prohibited diuretic. The Panam Sports Disciplinary Commission announced this positive on the day the Lima Games are closed, on 11 August 2019. As a consequence, the Puerto Rican duo loses gold, which passes to the United States. Colombia gets the silver, and the bronze goes to the Mexican team.
11 August 2019	Bowling; Men's doubles	United States	+1	−1		0	Jean Pérez Faure, a member of the Puerto Rican team who won the gold medal in the men's doubles has tested positive for doping with chlorthalidone, a prohibited diuretic. The Panam Sports Disciplinary Commission announced this positive on the day the Lima Games are closed, on 11 August 2019. As a consequence, the Puerto Rican duo loses gold, which passes to the United States. Colombia gets the silver, and the bronze goes to the Mexican team.
11 August 2019	Bowling; Men's doubles	Colombia		+1	−1	0	Jean Pérez Faure, a member of the Puerto Rican team who won the gold medal in the men's doubles has tested positive for doping with chlorthalidone, a prohibited diuretic. The Panam Sports Disciplinary Commission announced this positive on the day the Lima Games are closed, on 11 August 2019. As a consequence, the Puerto Rican duo loses gold, which passes to the United States. Colombia gets the silver, and the bronze goes to the Mexican team.
11 August 2019	Bowling; Men's doubles	Mexico			+1	+1	Jean Pérez Faure, a member of the Puerto Rican team who won the gold medal in the men's doubles has tested positive for doping with chlorthalidone, a prohibited diuretic. The Panam Sports Disciplinary Commission announced this positive on the day the Lima Games are closed, on 11 August 2019. As a consequence, the Puerto Rican duo loses gold, which passes to the United States. Colombia gets the silver, and the bronze goes to the Mexican team.
List of official changes in medal standings (after the Games)
27 September 2019	Judo; Women's 57 kg	Rafaela Silva (BRA) DSQ	−1			−1	Rafaela Silva who won the gold medal in the women's 57 kg category, has tested positive for doping with fenoterol after the Games.
27 September 2019	Judo; Women's 57 kg	Ana Rosa (DOM)	+1	−1		0	Rafaela Silva who won the gold medal in the women's 57 kg category, has tested positive for doping with fenoterol after the Games.
27 September 2019	Judo; Women's 57 kg	Yadinis Amarís (COL)		+1	−1	0	Rafaela Silva who won the gold medal in the women's 57 kg category, has tested positive for doping with fenoterol after the Games.
27 September 2019	Judo; Women's 57 kg	Anailys Dorvigny (CUB)			+1	+1	Rafaela Silva who won the gold medal in the women's 57 kg category, has tested positive for doping with fenoterol after the Games.
26 December 2019	Rowing; Men's quadruple sculls	Uruguay DSQ	−1			−1	The team from Uruguay was disqualified for doping.
26 December 2019	Rowing; Men's quadruple sculls	Argentina	+1	−1		0	The team from Uruguay was disqualified for doping.
26 December 2019	Rowing; Men's quadruple sculls	Cuba		+1	−1	0	The team from Uruguay was disqualified for doping.
26 December 2019	Rowing; Men's quadruple sculls	Mexico			+1	+1	The team from Uruguay was disqualified for doping.
26 December 2019	Karate; Men's 84 kg	Carlos Sinisterra (COL) DSQ	−1			−1	Carlos Sinisterra from Colombia was disqualified for doping.
26 December 2019	Karate; Men's 84 kg	Kamran Madani (USA)	+1	−1		0	Carlos Sinisterra from Colombia was disqualified for doping.
26 December 2019	Karate; Men's 84 kg	Alan Ever Cuevas (MEX)		+1	−1	0	Carlos Sinisterra from Colombia was disqualified for doping.
26 December 2019	Boxing; Women's 75 kg	Jessica Caicedo (COL) DSQ	−1			−1	Jessica Caicedo from Colombia was disqualified for doping.
26 December 2019	Boxing; Women's 75 kg	Naomi Graham (USA)	+1	−1		0	Jessica Caicedo from Colombia was disqualified for doping.
26 December 2019	Boxing; Women's 75 kg	Tammara Thibeault (CAN)		+1	−1	0	Jessica Caicedo from Colombia was disqualified for doping.
26 December 2019	Boxing; Women's 75 kg	Érika Pachito (ECU)			+1	+1	Jessica Caicedo from Colombia was disqualified for doping.
26 December 2019	Wrestling; Men's Greco-Roman 67 kg	Shalom Villegas (VEN) DSQ		−1		−1	Shalom Villegas from Venezuela was disqualified for doping.
26 December 2019	Wrestling; Men's Greco-Roman 67 kg	Manuel López (MEX)		+1	−1	0	Shalom Villegas from Venezuela was disqualified for doping.
26 December 2019	Wrestling; Men's Greco-Roman 67 kg	Nilton Soto (PER)			+1	+1	Shalom Villegas from Venezuela was disqualified for doping.
26 December 2019	Athletics; Women's discus throw	Andressa de Morais (BRA) DSQ		−1		−1	Andressa de Morais from Brazil was disqualified for doping. Silver medal was won by Fernanda Martins, also from Brazil.
26 December 2019	Athletics; Women's discus throw	Fernanda Martins (BRA)		+1	−1	0	Andressa de Morais from Brazil was disqualified for doping. Silver medal was won by Fernanda Martins, also from Brazil.
26 December 2019	Athletics; Women's discus throw	Denia Caballero (CUB)			+1	+1	Andressa de Morais from Brazil was disqualified for doping. Silver medal was won by Fernanda Martins, also from Brazil.
26 December 2019	Cycling; Men's sprint	Njisane Phillip (TTO) DSQ		−1		−1	Njisane Phillip from Trinidad and Tobago was disqualified for doping.
26 December 2019	Cycling; Men's sprint	Kevin Quintero (COL)		+1	−1	0	Njisane Phillip from Trinidad and Tobago was disqualified for doping.
26 December 2019	Cycling; Men's sprint	Hersony Canelón (VEN)			+1	+1	Njisane Phillip from Trinidad and Tobago was disqualified for doping.
26 December 2019	Cycling; Men's team sprint	Trinidad and Tobago DSQ	−1			−1	Njisane Phillip from Trinidad and Tobago and Kacio Fonseca from Brazil were disqualified for doping.
26 December 2019	Cycling; Men's team sprint	Colombia	+1	−1		0	Njisane Phillip from Trinidad and Tobago and Kacio Fonseca from Brazil were disqualified for doping.
26 December 2019	Cycling; Men's team sprint	Mexico		+1		+1	Njisane Phillip from Trinidad and Tobago and Kacio Fonseca from Brazil were disqualified for doping.
26 December 2019	Cycling; Men's team sprint	Brazil DSQ			−1	−1	Njisane Phillip from Trinidad and Tobago and Kacio Fonseca from Brazil were disqualified for doping.
26 December 2019	Cycling; Men's team sprint	Peru			+1	+1	Njisane Phillip from Trinidad and Tobago and Kacio Fonseca from Brazil were disqualified for doping.
1 July 2020	Swimming; Men's marathon 10 kilometres	Guillermo Bertola (ARG) DSQ		−1		−1	Guillermo Bertola who won the silver medal in the men's marathon 10 kilometres category, has tested positive for doping.
1 July 2020	Swimming; Men's marathon 10 kilometres	Taylor Abbott (USA)		+1	−1	0	Guillermo Bertola who won the silver medal in the men's marathon 10 kilometres category, has tested positive for doping.
1 July 2020	Swimming; Men's marathon 10 kilometres	Victor Colonese (BRA)			+1	+1	Guillermo Bertola who won the silver medal in the men's marathon 10 kilometres category, has tested positive for doping.

== See also ==
- All-time Pan American Games medal table
