= 2015 Pan American Games medal table =

- Location: Toronto, Canada

Highlights
- Most gold medals: United States (103)
- Most total medals: United States (265)

The 2015 Pan American Games medal table is a list of National Olympic Committees (NOCs) ranked by the number of gold medals won by their athletes during the 2015 Pan American Games, held in Toronto, Canada from July 10 to 26, 2015. Approximately 6,132 athletes from 41 NOCs participated in 364 events in 36 sports and 51 disciplines.

The United States led the medal table both in number of gold medals won (103), and in overall medals (265). Behind the United States, Canada was second on the medal table by golds (78), and second by overall medals (219) – their best result ever, while Brazil was third by golds (42), and third by overall medals (141). Cuba's 4th-place finish was the first time since 1971 that the country had finished outside top-2.

High jumper Levern Spencer won St. Lucia's first Pan American gold medal.

== Medal table ==
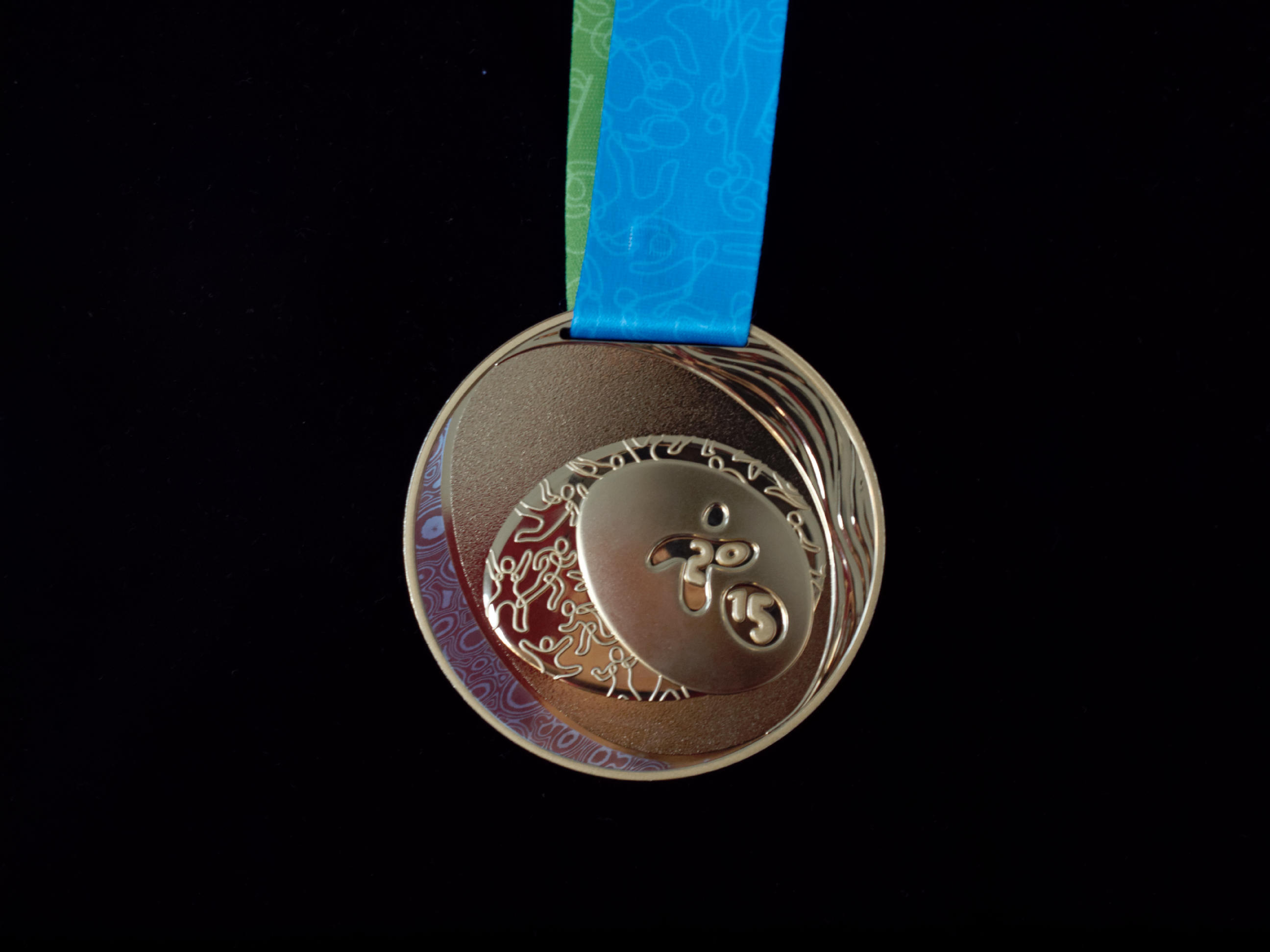
Gold medal

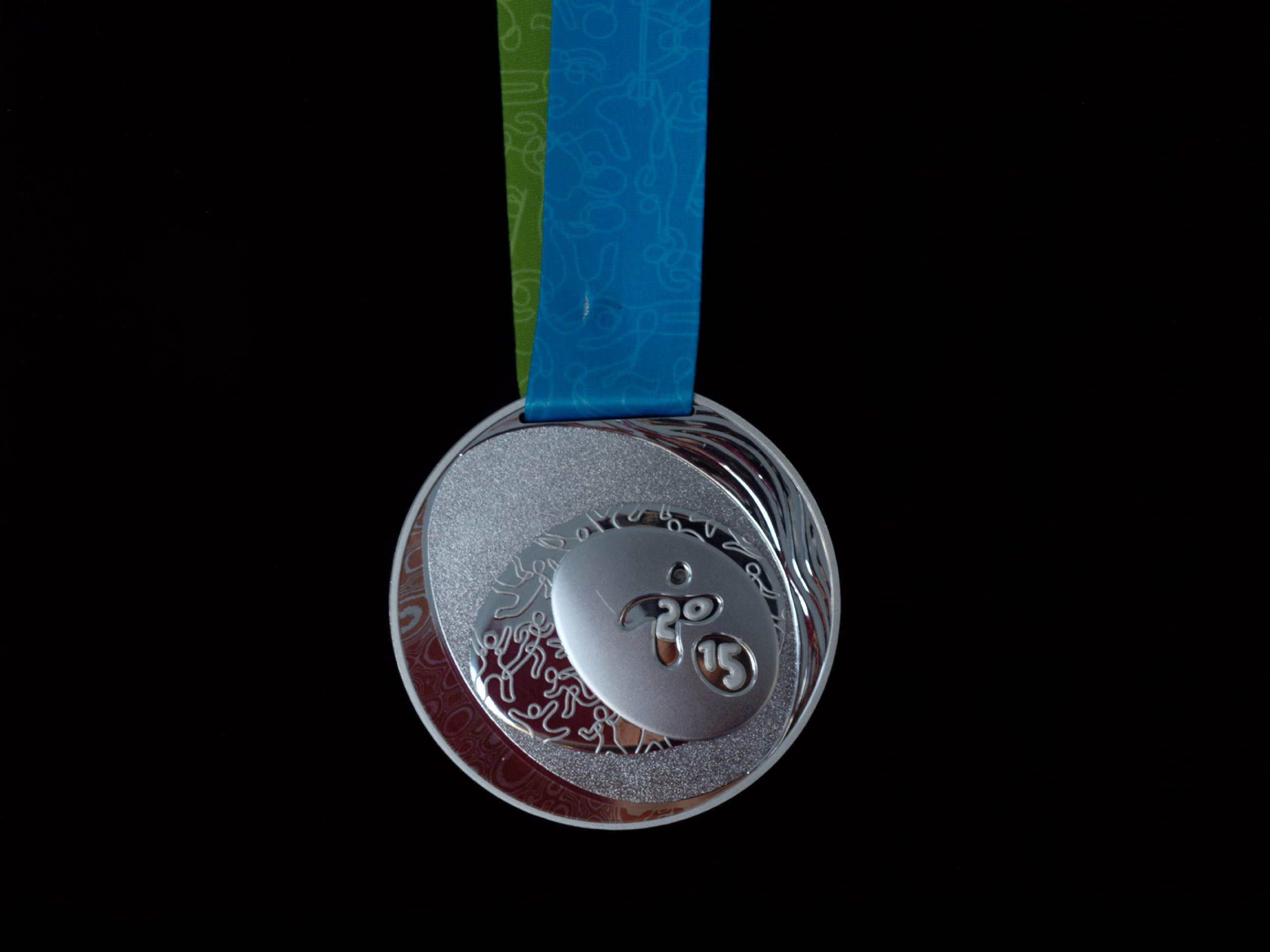
Silver medal

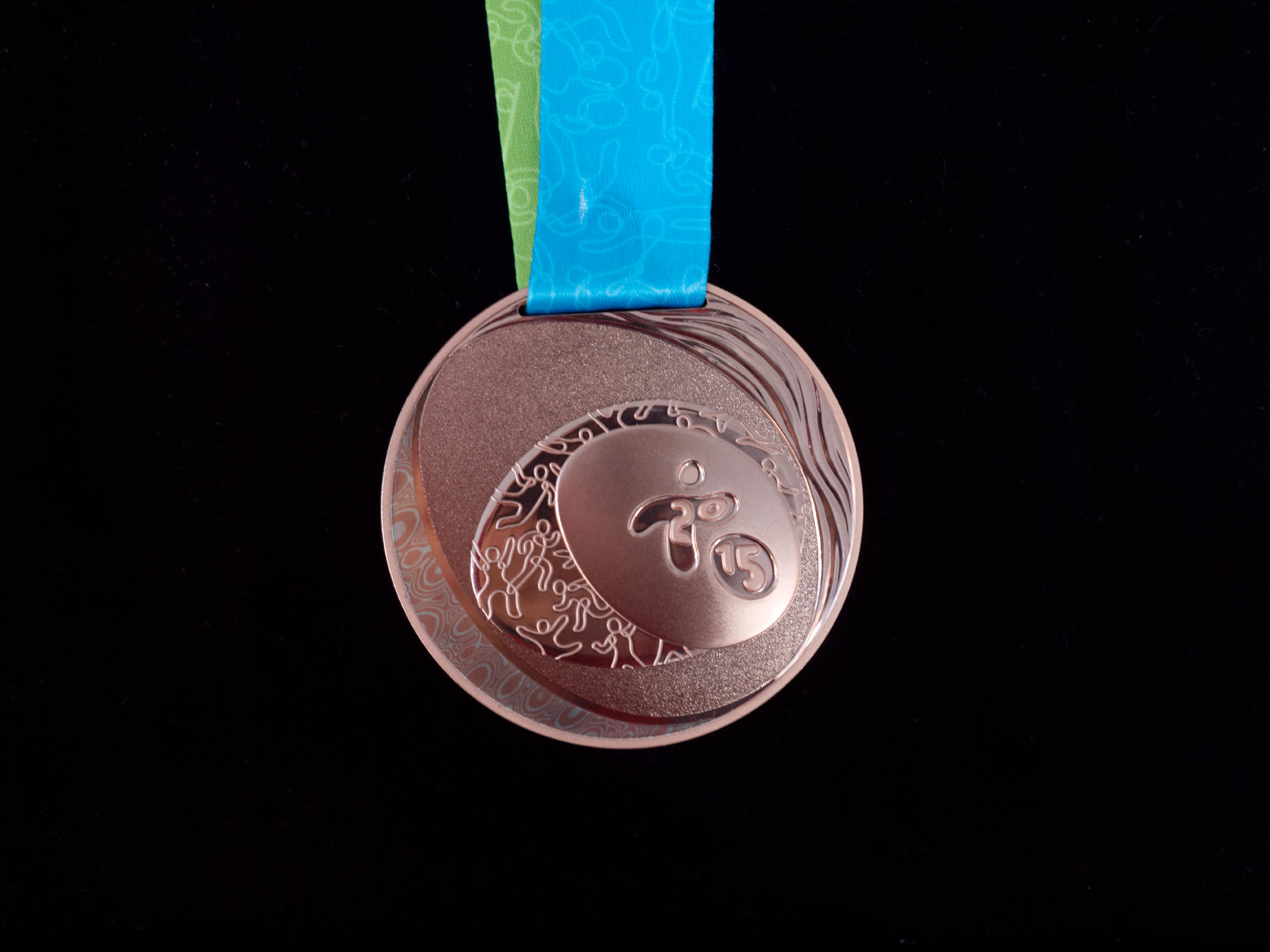
Bronze medal

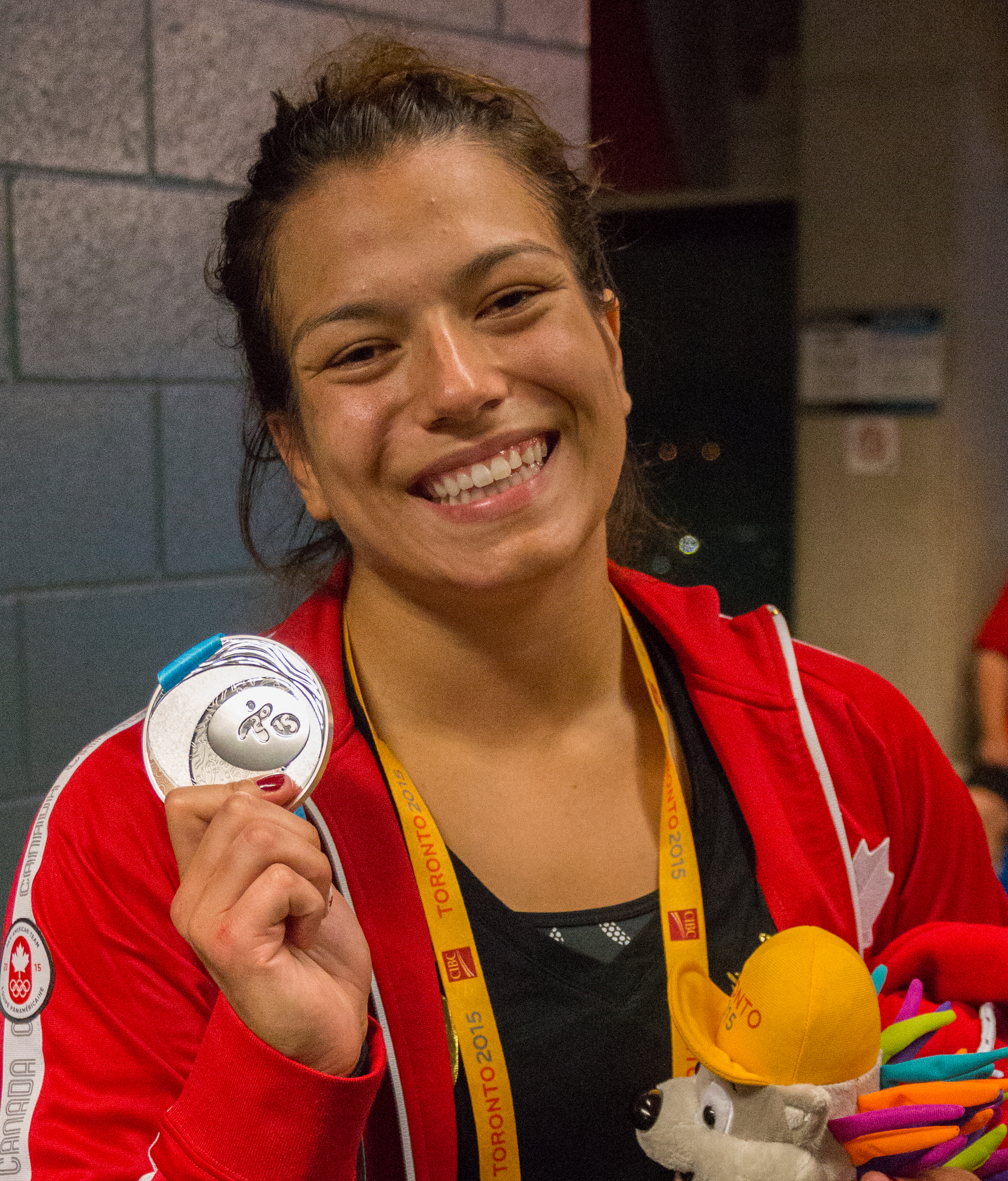
Justina Di Stasio, of Canada, wrestling silver medalist

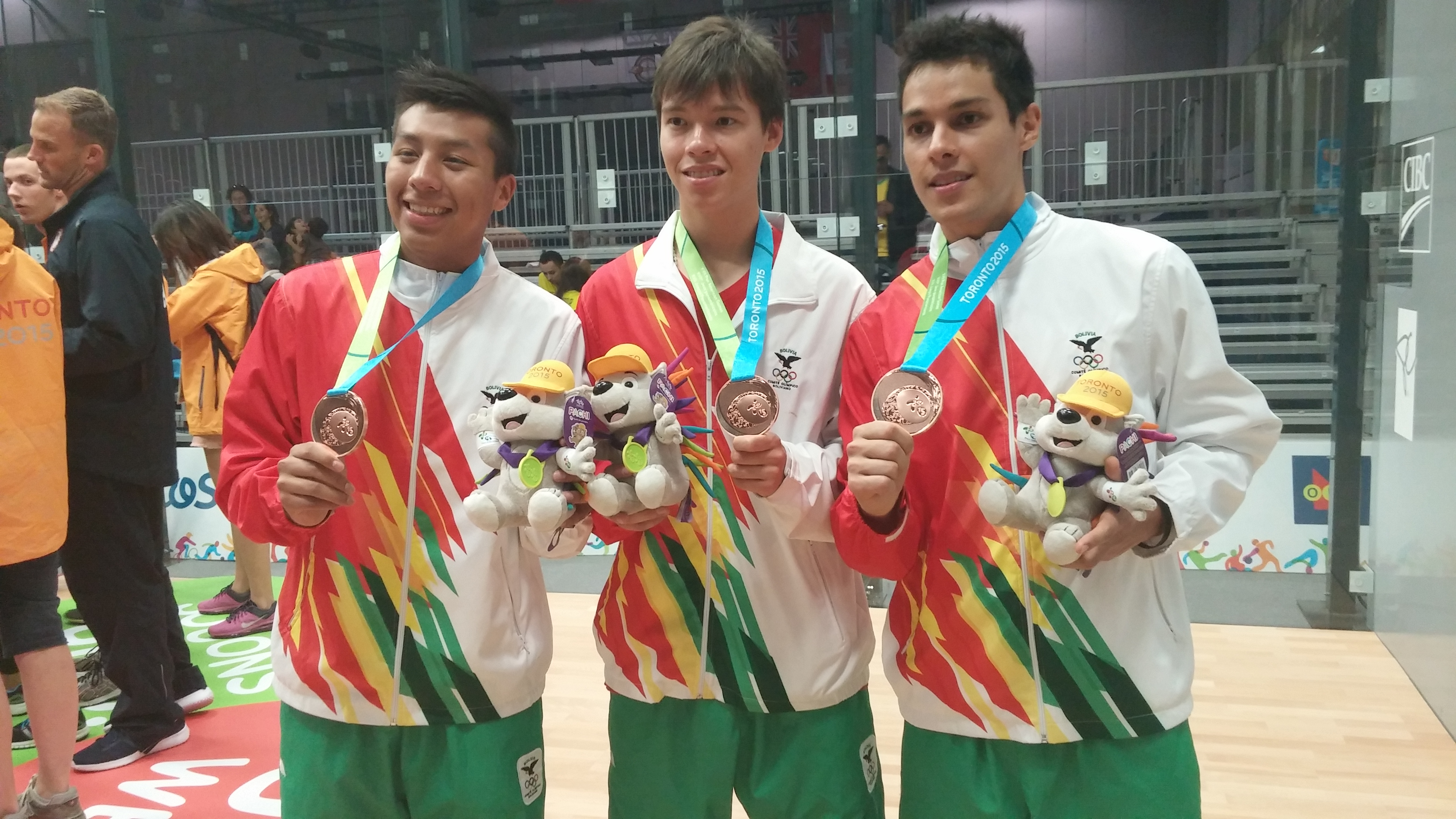
Bolivia's bronze medal Racquetball Men's team

The ranking in this table is based on information provided by the Pan American Sports Organization (PASO) and is consistent with PASO convention in its published medal tables. By default, the table is ordered by the number of gold medals the athletes from a nation have won (in this context, a "nation" is an entity represented by a National Olympic Committee). The number of silver medals is taken into consideration next and then the number of bronze medals. If nations are still tied, equal ranking is given and they are listed alphabetically by IOC country code.

In badminton, boxing, judo, karate, racquetball, squash, taekwondo, table tennis, and wrestling two bronze medals will be awarded for each event. Also in bowling, fencing and squash two bronze medals will be awarded in some events. Therefore, the total number of bronze medals will be greater than the total number of gold or silver medals.

Two gold medals, one to the United States and one to Colombia, were awarded for a first-place tie in the men's pommel horse. Two gold medals were also awarded for a first-place tie in the men's coxless pair, one to Chile and one to Argentina. No silver medal was awarded for both events. Two bronze medals were awarded for a third-place tie at the men's K2 200m, one to Brazil and one to Canada.

Eleven NOCs did not win medals: Aruba, Belize, British Virgin Islands, Cayman Islands, Dominica, Guyana, Haiti, Nicaragua, Suriname and the Virgin Islands.

* Host nation (Canada)

Rank	NOC	Gold	Silver	Bronze	Total
1	United States	103	82	80	265
2	Canada*	78	70	71	219
3	Brazil	42	39	60	141
4	Cuba	36	27	34	97
5	Colombia	27	14	31	72
6	Mexico	22	30	43	95
7	Argentina	15	29	30	74
8	Venezuela	8	22	20	50
9	Ecuador	7	9	16	32
10	Guatemala	6	1	3	10
11	Chile	5	6	18	29
12	Dominican Republic	3	11	10	24
13	Jamaica	3	4	2	9
14	Peru	3	3	6	12
15	Trinidad and Tobago	3	3	2	8
16	Bahamas	2	2	2	6
17	Puerto Rico	1	1	13	15
18	Uruguay	1	1	3	5
19	Saint Lucia^{[a]}	1	0	0	1
20	Barbados	0	1	2	3
20	Bolivia	0	1	2	3
20	El Salvador	0	1	2	3
20	Paraguay	0	1	2	3
24	Panama	0	1	1	2
25	Antigua and Barbuda	0	1	0	1
25	Grenada	0	1	0	1
25	Honduras	0	1	0	1
28	Bermuda	0	0	1	1
28	Costa Rica	0	0	1	1
28	Saint Kitts and Nevis	0	0	1	1
28	Saint Vincent and the Grenadines	0	0	1	1
Totals (31 entries)		366	362	457	1,185

^[a] First ever gold medal

== See also ==
- All-time Pan American Games medal table
