= El Salvador at the Pan American Games =

- IOC code: ESA
- NOC: El Salvador Olympic Committee
- Medals Ranked 21st: Gold 5 Silver 9 Bronze 18 Total 32

Pan American Games appearances (overview)
- 1951; 1955; 1959; 1963; 1967; 1971; 1975; 1979; 1983; 1987; 1991; 1995; 1999; 2003; 2007; 2011; 2015; 2019; 2023

At the most recent Pan American Games in 2019, El Salvador took home 3 gold medals, quadrupling its gold medal count from one to four. The country also took home both gold medals on offer in bodybuilding, a sport making its debut at the Pan American Games.

== Pan American Games ==
=== Medals by games ===
| Year | Host city | Gold | Silver | Bronze | Total |
|---|---|---|---|---|---|
| 1951 | Buenos Aires | 0 | 0 | 0 | 0 |
| 1955 | Mexico City | 0 | 0 | 0 | 0 |
| 1959 | Chicago | 0 | 0 | 0 | 0 |
| 1963 | São Paulo | 0 | 0 | 0 | 0 |
| 1967 | Winnipeg | 0 | 0 | 0 | 0 |
| 1971 | Cali | 0 | 0 | 0 | 0 |
| 1975 | Mexico City | 0 | 0 | 1 | 1 |
| 1979 | San Juan | 0 | 0 | 1 | 1 |
| 1983 | Caracas | 0 | 0 | 0 | 0 |
| 1987 | Indianapolis | 0 | 0 | 1 | 1 |
| 1991 | Havana | 0 | 0 | 0 | 0 |
| 1995 | Mar del Plata | 0 | 1 | 0 | 1 |
| 1999 | Winnipeg | 0 | 0 | 1 | 1 |
| 2003 | Santo Domingo | 0 | 2 | 2 | 4 |
| 2007 | Rio de Janeiro | 1 | 3 | 6 | 10 |
| 2011 | Guadalajara | 0 | 1 | 1 | 2 |
| 2015 | Toronto | 0 | 1 | 2 | 3 |
| 2019 | Lima | 3 | 0 | 1 | 4 |
| 2023 | Santiago | 1 | 1 | 2 | 4 |
| Total | | 5 | 9 | 18 | 32 |

== Junior Pan American Games ==
=== Medals by games ===
| Games | Gold | Silver | Bronze | Total | Rank |
| (Colombia) 2021 Cali-Valle | 0 | 3 | 5 | 8 | 20th |
| (Paraguay) 2025 Asunción | 0 | 2 | 1 | 3 | 28th |
| Total | 0 | 5 | 6 | 11 | 29th |
