= 2023 Pan American Games medal table =

- Location: Santiago, Chile

Highlights
- Most gold medals: United States (124)
- Most total medals: United States (286)

The 2023 Pan American Games medal table is a list of National Olympic Committees (NOCs) ranked by the number of gold medals won by their athletes during the 2023 Pan American Games, held in Santiago, Chile from October 20 to November 5, 2023. Approximately 6,909 athletes from 40 NOCs and an Independent Athletes Team participated in 425 events in 39 sports. A record 34 different teams won medals, surpassing the previous record of 32 in 2007.

== Sports information ==
In badminton, boxing, judo, karate, racquetball, squash, taekwondo and table tennis two bronze medals were awarded for each event. In wrestling two bronze medals were awarded in 17 events with the exception of the women's freestyle 50 kg event where only one bronze medal was awarded. Also in bowling and fencing two bronze medals were awarded in individual events. A tie for the first place in the women's 50 metre freestyle in swimming resulted in two gold medals and one bronze medal being awarded. Another two ties happened: one in the men's 100 metre freestyle swimming event and the other in the women's floor in artistic gymnastics. Two silvers were awarded in each event.

Therefore, the total number of bronze medals was greater than the total number of gold or silver medals. The following is the medal table maintained by the official website of the games.

== Medal table ==
The ranking in this table is based on information provided by Panam Sports and Santiago 2023 official website and is consistent with convention in its published medal tables. By default, the table is ordered by the number of gold medals the athletes from a nation have won (in this context, a "nation" is an entity represented by a National Olympic Committee). The number of silver medals is taken into consideration next and then the number of bronze medals. If nations are still tied, equal ranking is given and they are listed alphabetically by IOC country code.

After winning its first medal ever, a bronze in 2019, Aruba made the best historical performance at the Pan American Games with two silvers and one bronze medal.

* Host nation (Chile)

| Rank | NOC | Gold | Silver | Bronze | Total |
|---|---|---|---|---|---|
| 1 | United States | 124 | 75 | 87 | 286 |
| 2 | Brazil | 66 | 73 | 66 | 205 |
| 3 | Mexico | 52 | 38 | 52 | 142 |
| 4 | Canada | 46 | 55 | 63 | 164 |
| 5 | Cuba | 30 | 22 | 17 | 69 |
| 6 | Colombia | 29 | 38 | 34 | 101 |
| 7 | Argentina | 17 | 25 | 33 | 75 |
| 8 | Chile* | 12 | 31 | 36 | 79 |
| 9 | Peru | 10 | 6 | 16 | 32 |
| 10 | Venezuela | 8 | 15 | 21 | 44 |
| 11 | Dominican Republic | 8 | 7 | 17 | 32 |
| 12 | Ecuador | 7 | 12 | 17 | 36 |
| 13 | Puerto Rico | 3 | 6 | 11 | 20 |
| 14 | Independent Athletes Team | 3 | 4 | 12 | 19 |
| 15 | Uruguay | 2 | 5 | 3 | 10 |
| 16 | Panama | 2 | 1 | 5 | 8 |
| 17 | Bolivia | 2 | 1 | 2 | 5 |
| 18 | Costa Rica | 1 | 1 | 7 | 9 |
| 19 | El Salvador | 1 | 1 | 2 | 4 |
| 19 | Trinidad and Tobago | 1 | 1 | 2 | 4 |
| 21 | Paraguay | 1 | 0 | 6 | 7 |
| 22 | Jamaica | 1 | 0 | 5 | 6 |
| 23 | Aruba | 0 | 2 | 1 | 3 |
| 24 | Nicaragua | 0 | 2 | 0 | 2 |
| 25 | Bahamas | 0 | 1 | 2 | 3 |
| 25 | Guyana | 0 | 1 | 2 | 3 |
| 25 | Haiti | 0 | 1 | 2 | 3 |
| 28 | Antigua and Barbuda | 0 | 1 | 0 | 1 |
| 28 | Suriname | 0 | 1 | 0 | 1 |
| 30 | Barbados | 0 | 0 | 2 | 2 |
| 31 | Bermuda | 0 | 0 | 1 | 1 |
| 31 | Dominica | 0 | 0 | 1 | 1 |
| 31 | Honduras | 0 | 0 | 1 | 1 |
| 31 | Saint Kitts and Nevis | 0 | 0 | 1 | 1 |
| Totals (34 entries) | | 426 | 426 | 527 | 1,379 |
