= Argentina at the Pan American Games =

- IOC code: ARG
- NOC: Argentine Olympic Committee
- Medals Ranked 5th: Gold 343 Silver 391 Bronze 501 Total 1,235

Pan American Games appearances (overview)
- 1951; 1955; 1959; 1963; 1967; 1971; 1975; 1979; 1983; 1987; 1991; 1995; 1999; 2003; 2007; 2011; 2015; 2019; 2023

Argentina has competed at every edition of the Pan American Games since the first edition of the multi-sport event in 1951, in which it hosted. Argentina competed in the first ever Pan American Winter Games in 1990; however, it failed to get medals.

Argentina finished first in the medal table in the 1951 edition.

== Pan American Games ==
=== Medals by games ===
^{1}	Hosting edition

To sort the tables by host city, total medal count, or any other column, click on the icon next to the column title.

Year	Ref.	Edition	Host city	Rank	Gold	Silver	Bronze	Total
1951 ^{a}		I	(Argentina) Buenos Aires ^{1}	1st	68	47	37	152
1955 ^{b}		II	Mexico City	2nd	27	33	20	80
1959 ^{c}		III	(United States) Chicago	2nd	9	22	12	43
1963 ^{d}		IV	(Brazil) São Paulo	4th	8	15	19	42
1967 ^{e}		V	(Canada) Winnipeg	5th	8	13	11	32
1971		VI	(Colombia) Cali	6th	6	4	12	22
1975		VII	Mexico City	6th	3	5	7	15
1979		VIII	(Puerto Rico) San Juan	4th	12	7	17	36
1983		IX	(Venezuela) Caracas	7th	3	10	23	36
1987		X	(United States) Indianapolis	5th	12	14	22	48
1991		XI	(Cuba) Havana	6th	11	15	29	55
1995		XII	(Argentina) Mar del Plata ^{1}	4th	40	45	74	159
1999		XIII	(Canada) Winnipeg	5th	25	19	28	72
2003		XIV	(Dominican Republic) Santo Domingo	7th	16	20	27	63
2007		XV	(Brazil) Rio de Janeiro	8th	11	16	33	60
2011		XVI	(Mexico) Guadalajara	7th	21	19	34	74
2015		XVII	(Canada) Toronto	7th	15	29	30	74
2019		XVIII	(Peru) Lima	5th	33	33	34	100
2023		XIX	(Chile) Santiago	7th	17	25	33	75
Total ^{f}				5th	328	366	469	1,163

Notes

- ^a Some sources appoint 47 silver medals and 39 bronze medals, instead of 44 and 38, respectively. This would result in a total of 154 medals earned during the 1951 Games, instead of 150.
- ^b Some sources appoint 33 silver medals and 20 bronze medals, instead of 31 and 15, respectively. This would result in a total of 80 medals earned during the 1955 Games, instead of 73.
- ^c Some sources appoint 22 silver medals and 12 bronze medals, instead of 19 and 11, respectively. This would result in a total of 43 medals earned during the 1959 Games, instead of 39.
- ^d Some sources appoint 20 bronze medals, instead of 16. This would result in a total of 43 medals earned during the 1963 Games, instead of 39.
- ^e Some sources appoint 13 silver medals and 11 bronze medals, instead of 14 and 12, respectively. This would result in a total of 32 medals earned during the 1967 Games, instead of 34.
- ^f According to those sources, the historical medal table for Argentina counts 305 silver medals and 408 bronze medals, instead of 298 and 398, respectively. This would result in a total number of 992 Pan American medals.

=== Medals by sport ===
Argentines have won medals in most of the current Pan American sports. The exceptions are artistic swimming, badminton, baseball and sport climbing.

As of the conclusion of the 2023 Pan American Games

Leading in that sport

Sport	Gold	Silver	Bronze	Total
Rowing	46	31	30	107
Roller speed skating	26	24	29	79
Shooting	23	37	41	101
Boxing	23	16	28	67
Athletics	17	18	29	64
Field hockey	17	6	0	23
Tennis	16	13	14	43
Sailing	15	15	25	55
Track cycling	14	15	14	43
Basque pelota	13	5	9	27
Swimming	12	22	22	56
Fencing	12	16	27	55
Canoe sprint	12	14	22	48
Wrestling	8	13	10	31
Road cycling	8	5	7	20
Artistic gymnastics	7	9	17	33
Artistic roller skating	7	8	6	21
Football	7	3	3	13
Judo	5	10	29	44
Karate	5	3	7	15
Taekwondo	4	5	16	25
Roller hockey	4	1	0	5
Water skiing	3	2	13	18
Volleyball	3	0	5	8
Equestrian	2	12	2	16
Handball	2	7	3	12
Sambo	2	3	4	9
Basketball	2	2	0	4
Water polo	2	1	1	4
Weightlifting	1	19	9	29
Table tennis	1	8	2	11
Mountain biking	1	2	4	7
Rugby	1	2	0	3
Rhythmic gymnastics	1	1	5	7
Beach volleyball	1	1	2	4
Archery	1	1	1	3
BMX freestyle	1	1	1	3
Marathon swimming	1	1	1	3
BMX racing	1	0	3	4
Softball	1	0	2	3
Polo	1	0	0	1
Racquetball	0	4	3	7
Squash	0	3	7	10
Slalom canoeing	0	3	0	3
Triathlon	0	1	3	4
Diving	0	1	1	2
Golf	0	1	1	2
Surfing	0	1	1	2
3x3 basketball	0	1	0	1
Futsal	0	1	0	1
Modern pentathlon	0	0	4	4
Trampoline gymnastics	0	0	2	2
Bowling	0	0	1	1
Totals (53 entries)	329	368	466	1,163

Best results in non-medaling sports:

Summer
Sport	Rank	Athlete	Event & Year
Artistic swimming	5th	Etel Sánchez; Sofía Sánchez; Camila Maria Arregui; Lucia Paula Diaz; Sofia Eliceche; Ana Victoria Fernandez; Sofia Ana Boasso; Brenda Moller; Lucina Soledad Simon	Women's team in 2015
Badminton	5th	Nicolas Oliva & Santiago Otero	Men's doubles in 2023
Badminton	5th	Nicolas Oliva & Ailen Oliva	Mixed doubles in 2023
Baseball	6th	Argentina men's team	Men's tournament in 1995
Sport climbing	6th	Valentina Aguada	Women's boulder & lead

== Winter Pan American Games ==
=== Medals by games ===
Year	Ref.	Edition	Host city	Rank	Gold	Silver	Bronze	Total
1990		I	(Argentina) Las Leñas ^{1}	—	0	0	0	0
Total				—	0	0	0	0

== Junior Pan American Games ==
=== Medals by games ===
Games	Gold	Silver	Bronze	Total	Gold medals	Total medals
(Colombia) 2021 Cali-Valle	19	22	32	73	6th	5th
(Paraguay) 2025 Asunción	27	38	30	95	5th	5th
Total	46	40	62	168	6th	5th
