= Puerto Rico at the Pan American Games =

- IOC code: PUR
- NOC: Puerto Rico Olympic Committee
- Medals Ranked 12th: Gold 36 Silver 91 Bronze 159 Total 286

Pan American Games appearances (overview)
- 1951; 1955; 1959; 1963; 1967; 1971; 1975; 1979; 1983; 1987; 1991; 1995; 1999; 2003; 2007; 2011; 2015; 2019; 2023

Puerto Rico first participated at the Pan American Games in 1951 and has competed in every edition since then. Puerto Rico did not compete at the 1990 Winter Pan American Games in Las Leñas. Puerto Rico won the first medal at the 1955 Pan American Games in Mexico City with two silver medals and two bronze medals. 12 years later in Winnipeg, Puerto Rico won the first gold medal at the Pan American Games.

== Pan American Games ==
=== Medals by games ===
Year	Host city	Gold	Silver	Bronze	Total
1951	Buenos Aires	0	0	0	0
1955	Mexico City	0	2	2	4
1959	Chicago	0	2	4	6
1963	São Paulo	0	2	2	4
1967	Winnipeg	1	1	3	5
1971	Cali	2	4	7	13
1975	Mexico City	0	3	7	10
1979	San Juan	2	9	10	21
1983	Caracas	2	7	6	15
1987	Indianapolis	3	6	20	29
1991	Havana	3	13	11	27
1995	Mar del Plata	1	9	12	22
1999	Winnipeg	1	3	8	12
2003	Santo Domingo	3	4	9	16
2007	Rio de Janeiro	3	6	12	21
2011	Guadalajara	6	8	8	22
2015	Toronto	1	1	13	15
2019	Lima	5	5	14	24
2023	Santiago	3	6	11	20
Total		36	91	159	286

== Junior Pan American Games ==
=== Medals by games ===
Games	Gold	Silver	Bronze	Total	Gold medals	Total medals
(Colombia) 2021 Cali-Valle	8	4	8	20	9th	12th
(Paraguay) 2025 Asunción	Future event					
Total	8	4	8	20	9th	12th
