= Venezuela at the Pan American Games =

- IOC code: VEN
- NOC: Venezuelan Olympic Committee
- Website: www.cov.com.ve
- Medals Ranked 8th: Gold 110 Silver 235 Bronze 317 Total 662

Pan American Games appearances (overview)
- 1951; 1955; 1959; 1963; 1967; 1971; 1975; 1979; 1983; 1987; 1991; 1995; 1999; 2003; 2007; 2011; 2015; 2019; 2023

Venezuela at the Pan American Games.

== Pan American Games ==
=== Medals by games ===
Year	Host city	Gold	Silver	Bronze	Total
1951	Buenos Aires	0	1	1	2
1955	Mexico City	2	5	11	18
1959	Chicago	1	7	7	15
1963	São Paulo	3	5	9	17
1967	Winnipeg	1	4	6	11
1971	Cali	2	3	4	9
1975	Mexico City	0	1	11	12
1979	San Juan	1	4	4	9
1983	Caracas	12	26	35	73
1987	Indianapolis	3	12	12	27
1991	Havana	4	14	20	38
1995	Mar del Plata	9	14	25	48
1999	Winnipeg	7	16	17	40
2003	Santo Domingo	16	21	27	64
2007	Rio de Janeiro	12	23	35	70
2011	Guadalajara	11	27	33	71
2015	Toronto	8	22	20	50
2019	Lima	9	14	20	43
2023	Santiago	8	15	21	44
Total		109	235	317	662

== Junior Pan American Games ==
=== Medals by games ===
Games	Gold	Silver	Bronze	Total	Rank
(Colombia) 2021 Cali-Valle	7	8	21	36	11th
(Paraguay) 2025 Asunción	12	15	19	46	9°
Total	19	23	40	82	10th
