= Bids for the Pan American Games =

Bids for the Pan American Games is the process where associations select from within their national territory cities to put forward bids to host a Pan American Games, which is governed by Panam Sports. The host cities also hold the Parapan American Games following the conclusion of the Pan American Games.

The General Assembly of Panam Sports is responsible for deciding who will host the Games. The federation then entrusts the organisation of the games to the organising committee, association, and government of the winning host nation or territory, including security and finance, but is still monitored by the federation.

== Pan American Games ==
Games	Year	Bid party		Result	Final selection process		Note	Ref.
Games	Year	City	Nation	Result	Date	Panam Sports General Assembly	Note	Ref.
I	1951	Buenos Aires	Argentina	Awarded to host the 1951 Pan American Games (sole bid)	1948			
II	1955	Mexico City	Mexico	Awarded to host the 1955 Pan American Games (15 votes)	6 March 1951			
II	1955	Guatemala City	Guatemala	Eliminated in the first round of voting (2 votes)	6 March 1951			
III	1959	~~Cleveland~~	~~United States~~	Awarded to host the 1959 Pan American Games and later withdrew	11 March 1955	Mexico City		
III	1959	Chicago	United States	Awarded to host the 1959 Pan American Games (13 votes)	3 August 1957			
III	1959	São Paulo	Brazil	Eliminated in the first round of voting (6 votes)	3 August 1957			
IV	1963	São Paulo	Brazil	Awarded to host the 1963 Pan American Games (18 votes)	25 August 1959	Chicago		
IV	1963	Winnipeg	Canada	Eliminated in the first round of voting (5 votes)	25 August 1959	Chicago		
V	1967	Winnipeg	Canada	Awarded to host the 1967 Pan American Games	22 April 1963	São Paulo		
V	1967	Caracas	Venezuela	Eliminated	22 April 1963	São Paulo		
V	1967	Santiago	Chile	Eliminated	22 April 1963	São Paulo		
VI	1971	Cali	Colombia	Awarded to host the 1971 Pan American Games (12 votes)	22 July 1967	Winnipeg		
VI	1971	Santiago	Chile	Eliminated in the first round of voting (11 votes)	22 July 1967	Winnipeg		
VI	1971	Champ	United States	Eliminated in the first round of voting (6 votes)	22 July 1967	Winnipeg		
VII	1975	~~Santiago~~	~~Chile~~	Awarded to host the 1975 Pan American Games (27 votes) and later withdrew	29 August 1969	Cali		
VII	1975	San Juan	Puerto Rico	Eliminated in the first round of voting (0 votes)	29 August 1969	Cali		
VII	1975	~~São Paulo~~	~~Brazil~~	Awarded to host the 1975 Pan American Games (sole bid) and later withdrew	1974			
VII	1975	Mexico City	Mexico	Awarded to host the 1975 Pan American Games (sole bid)				
VIII	1979	San Juan	Puerto Rico	Awarded to host the 1979 Pan American Games (sole bid)	31 May 1973	Santiago		
IX	1983	Caracas	Venezuela	Awarded to host the 1983 Pan American Games	23 April 1977	San Juan		
IX	1983	Hamilton	Canada	Eliminated in the first round of voting	23 April 1977	San Juan		
X	1987	~~Santiago~~	~~Chile~~	Awarded to host the 1987 Pan American Games (18 votes) and later withdrew	12 July 1981	Caraballeda		
X	1987	Quito	Ecuador	Eliminated in the first round of voting (14 votes)	12 July 1981	Caraballeda		
X	1987	Indianapolis	United States	Awarded to host the 1987 Pan American Games	18 December 1984			
X	1987	Havana	Cuba	Eliminated in the first round of voting	18 December 1984			
XI	1991	Havana	Cuba	Awarded to host the 1991 Pan American Games (sole bid)	14 November 1986	Bridgetown		
XII	1995	Mar del Plata	Argentina	Awarded to host the 1995 Pan American Games (sole bid)	October 1989	Havana		
XIII	1999	Winnipeg	Canada	Awarded to host the 1999 Pan American Games (28 votes in round three)	31 July 1994	Guayaquil	1999 Parapan American Games held in Mexico City	
XIII	1999	Santo Domingo	Dominican Republic	Eliminated in the third round of voting (22 votes)	31 July 1994	Guayaquil	1999 Parapan American Games held in Mexico City	
XIII	1999	Bogotá	Colombia	Eliminated in the first round of voting (10 votes)	31 July 1994	Guayaquil	1999 Parapan American Games held in Mexico City	
XIV	2003	Santo Domingo	Dominican Republic	Awarded to host the 2003 Pan American Games (28 votes in round two)	6 December 1998	Panama City	2003 Parapan American Games held in Mar del Plata	
XIV	2003	Guadalajara	Mexico	Eliminated in the second round of voting (24 votes)	6 December 1998	Panama City	2003 Parapan American Games held in Mar del Plata	
XIV	2003	Medellín	Colombia	Eliminated in the first round of voting (6 votes)	6 December 1998	Panama City	2003 Parapan American Games held in Mar del Plata	
XV	2007	Rio de Janeiro	Brazil	Awarded to host the 2007 Pan American Games and 2007 Parapan American Games (30 votes)	24 August 2002	Mexico City		
XV	2007	San Antonio	United States	Eliminated in the first round of voting (21 votes)	24 August 2002	Mexico City		
XVI	2011	Guadalajara	Mexico	Awarded to host the 2011 Pan American Games and 2011 Parapan American Games (sole bid)	2 June 2006	Buenos Aires		
XVII	2015	Toronto	Canada	Awarded to host the 2015 Pan American Games and 2015 Parapan American Games (33 votes)	6 November 2009	Guadalajara		
XVII	2015	Lima	Peru	Eliminated in the first round of voting (11 votes)	6 November 2009	Guadalajara		
XVII	2015	Bogotá	Colombia	Eliminated in the first round of voting (7 votes)	6 November 2009	Guadalajara		
XVIII	2019	Lima	Peru	Awarded to host the 2019 Pan American Games and 2019 Parapan American Games (31 votes)	11 October 2013	Toronto		
XVIII	2019	La Punta	Argentina	Eliminated in the first round of voting (9 votes)	11 October 2013	Toronto		
XVIII	2019	Santiago	Chile	Eliminated in the first round of voting (9 votes)	11 October 2013	Toronto		
XVIII	2019	Ciudad Bolívar	Venezuela	Eliminated in the first round of voting (8 votes)	11 October 2013	Toronto		
XIX	2023	Santiago	Chile	Awarded to host the 2023 Pan American Games and 2023 Parapan American Games (sole bid)	4 November 2017	Prague		
XX	2027	~~Barranquilla~~	~~Colombia~~	Awarded to host the 2027 Pan American Games and 2027 Parapan American Games (sole bid) and later revoked	27 August 2021	Barranquilla		
XX	2027	Lima	Peru	Awarded to host the 2027 Pan American Games 2027 Parapan American Games (28 votes)	12 March 2024			
XX	2027	Asunción	Paraguay	Eliminated in the first round of voting (24 votes)	12 March 2024			
XXI	2031	Asunción	Paraguay	Awarded to host the 2031 Pan American Games 2031 Parapan American Games (28 votes)	10 October 2025	Santiago		
XXI	2031	Rio de Janeiro and Niterói	Brazil	Eliminated in the first round of voting (24 votes)	10 October 2025	Santiago		

== Winter Pan American Games ==
Games	Year	Bid party		Result	Final selection process		Note	Ref.
Games	Year	City	Nation	Result	Date	Panam Sports General Assembly	Note	Ref.
I	1990	Las Leñas	Argentina	Awarded to host the 1990 Winter Pan American Games	1988			
~~II~~	1993	~~Santiago~~	~~Chile~~	Awarded to host the 1993 Winter Pan American Games and later cancelled				

== Junior Pan American Games ==
Games	Year	Bid party		Result	Final selection process		Note	Ref.
Games	Year	City	Nation	Result	Date	Panam Sports General Assembly	Note	Ref.
I	2021	Cali and Valle	Colombia	Awarded to host the 2021 Junior Pan American Games	27 March 2019	San José		
I	2021	Santa Ana	El Salvador	Eliminated	27 March 2019	San José		
I	2021	Monterrey	Mexico	Eliminated	27 March 2019	San José		
II	2025	Asunción	Paraguay	Awarded to host the 2025 Junior Pan American Games (32 votes)	28 November 2022	Miami		
II	2025	Santa Marta	Colombia	Eliminated in the first round of voting (16 votes)	28 November 2022	Miami		
III	2029	Rosario	Argentina	Awarded to host the 2029 Junior Pan American Games (29 votes)	28 August 2026	Lima		
III	2029	Guatemala City	Guatemala	Eliminated in the first round of voting (24 votes)	28 August 2026	Lima		
III	2029	Panama City	Panama	Withdrew during the host election process	28 August 2026	Lima		
