= Bids for the 2011 Pan American Games =

Bids for the 2011 Pan and Parapan American Games
Overview
- XVI Pan American Games; IV Parapan American Games
- Winner: Guadalajara

Details
- Committee: PASO
- Election venue: Buenos Aires, Argentina; 44th PASO General Assembly

Map
- Location of the bidding cities

Important dates
- Decision: June 2, 2006

Decision
- Winner: Guadalajara

Only one city submitted a bid to host the 2011 Pan American Games and Parapan Games that was recognized by the Pan American Sports Organization (PASO). Guadalajara, Mexico was selected by PASO unanimously as the host for 16th Pan American Games on Friday, June 2, 2006, at its 44th general assembly held in Buenos Aires, Argentina. Guadalajara was the only city to officially bid for the 2011 Pan American Games; this may have been in part due to no announced and/or open candidature period for the event.

== Host city selection ==
2011 Pan American Games bidding results
City	NOC	Round 1
Guadalajara	Mexico	Unanimous

== Candidate cities ==
=== Guadalajara, Mexico ===
On February 24, 2005, Governor Francisco Ramírez Acuña, Municipal President Emilio González Márquez and director of the organizing committee Carlos Andrade Garín met with the Odepa executives in Mexico City to formalize Guadalajara's intent for candidacy for the 2011 Pan American Games. As the only city to bid for the games, Guadalajara won.

Guadalajara had previously bid for two other Pan Am Games - in 2003, in which they lost to Santo Domingo, and in 2007 Pan American Games, where they withdrew.

== Showed preliminary interest ==
- San Antonio, United States

In June 2003, the Texas State Legislature amended a 1999 bill that only allowed any Texas city with a population of over 850,000 to host an Olympic or Pan American Game. The amendment changed the bill to allow any city in Texas to host the 2011 Pan American Games. In the following year, members of the San Antonio Sports Foundation expressed interest in pursuing a bid for the 2011 Pan American Games. However, San Antonio ultimately did not show any further interest and did not submit a bid.
