= Bids for the 1987 Pan American Games =

Overview
- X Pan American Games
- Winner: Santiago; Runner-up: Quito

Details
- Committee: PASO

Map
- Location of the bidding cities

Important dates
- Decision: July 12, 1981

Decision
- Winner: Santiago (18 votes)
- Runner-up: Quito (14 votes)

Two cities initially submitted bids to host the 1987 Pan American Games that were recognized by the Pan American Sports Organization. On July 12, 1981, Santiago was selected over Quito by PASO to host the X Pan American Games after the first round of voting at its general assembly held in Caraballeda, Venezuela.

For economic reasons, Santiago was forced to forfeit hosting the games. This made Quito the host of the games, but in 1984, they also stepped out. Subsequently, Havana and Indianapolis presented themselves as candidates to hold the 1987 Games. On December 18, 1984, PASO elected Indianapolis as the host city, giving Indianapolis two and a half years to prepare for the games.

== First host city selection ==
Only 32 of the 35 Pan American National Olympic Committees participated in voting, as Antigua, Cayman Islands and Guyana did not participate in the voting for reasons that were not explained. Santiago defeated Quito in the first round by a margin of four votes.

1987 Pan American Games bidding results
City	NOC	Round 1
Santiago	Chile	18
Quito	Ecuador	14

== First candidate cities ==
=== Santiago, Chile ===
In mid-1980, the Chilean Olympic Committee (COCH) requested the support of the President of Chile Augusto Pinochet to nominate Santiago as the venue for the X Pan American Games, which resulted into a letter from Pinochet, dated 10 December 1980, addressed to the President of PASO Mario Vázquez Raña.

President of the COCH Gustavo Benko reported that Chile had a budget of $150 million for the Games; of that amount, $70 million would be dedicated exclusively to sports fields and venues, $44 million to the Pan American Village, and the rest to organizational expenses. As a part of their bid, Santiago noted that the Chilean Department of Housing had already approved the Pan American Village construction in La Florida, which would include over 1,000 apartments, media and communication centers, recreational areas, club houses, medical centers, and training areas.

=== Quito, Ecuador ===
Many predictions had Quito as the favorite to host the 1987 Games; even Ecuador believed that they would have 22 votes in their favor.

Bids for the 1987 Pan American Games
Overview
- X Pan American Games
- Winner: Indianapolis; Runner-up: Havana

Details
- Committee: PASO

Map
- Location of the bidding cities

Important dates
- Decision: December 18, 1984

Decision
- Winner: Indianapolis
- Runner-up: Havana

== Second host city selection ==
Due to the Chilean Economic Crisis of 1982, Santiago was forced to forfeit hosting the game, making Quito the host of the games, but in 1984, they also stepped out; subsequently, Havana and Indianapolis presented themselves as candidates to hold the 1987 Games. In part due to Indianapolis already having most of the key venues in place, PASO selected them to host the games. Many believed that Cuba would end up boycotting the 1987 Games if they did not win. Considering Cuba was the second-largest presence in the Pan American Games, the United States Olympic Committee and PASO guaranteed to support the Cuban bid to organize the 1991 Games, so long as on Cuba participated in the Indianapolis games.

=== Indianapolis, United States ===
Originally, Indianapolis intended to bid for the 1991 Games, with a view to the 1993 World University Summer Games; however, after Santiago, and then Quito, backed out of hosting the 1987 Games, mayor of Indianapolis Bill Hudnut and former Indiana Supreme Court justice Theodore R. Boehm made a bid for Indianapolis to be the host city at the PASO meeting in Mexico City in November 1984. Indianapolis had recent success in hosting national and international sporting events, with the most recent one being the 1982 National Sports Festival, and was the headquarters of the Amateur Athletic Union. Because of this, the city already had over $136 million worth of first-class sporting venues.

=== Havana, Cuba ===
Cuba made a formal request to meet with PASO Havana in June 1984 to discuss the candidature of Havana to be the host of the 1987 Pan American Games. On that same day, the Cuban government announced that it would not be participating in the 1984 Los Angeles Olympics. President Fidel Castro explained to PASO that it was not for security reasons, but rather that it was due to solidarity reasons with the Soviet Union. This news did not bode well with PASO, and the meeting with Cuba was postponed, leading to Indianapolis winning the bid for the 1987 Games.

Many believed that, due to this, Cuba would not participate in the Indianapolis games. Nevertheless, the dialogue between the main Cuban authorities and those of the Indianapolis Organizing Committee and the United States Olympic Committee (USOC) flourished. Two agreements were made between the parties: Cuba would participate in the 1987 Pan American Games and the PASO and USOC gave guarantees to support the Cuban candidacy to organize the 1991 Pan American Games.
