= Bids for the 1979 Pan American Games =

Overview
- VIII Pan American Games
- Winner: San Juan, Puerto Rico

Details
- Committee: PASO

Map
- Location of the bidding cities

Important dates
- Decision: May 31, 1973

Decision
- Winner: San Juan, Puerto Rico

Two cities submitted bids to host the 1979 Pan American Games that were recognized by the Pan American Sports Organization (PASO). However, Bolivia dropped out of the race, leaving San Juan as the only candidate city. On May 31, 1973, San Juan was selected to host the VIII Pan American Games by PASO at its general assembly in Santiago, Chile.

== Host city selection ==
1979 Pan American Games bidding results
City	NOC	Round 1
San Juan	Puerto Rico	Unanimous

== Candidate cities ==
=== San Juan, Puerto Rico ===
San Juan had attempted to submit a bid for the 1975 Pan American Games, but had to withdraw, as the official documents on the proposal were incomplete. In 1972, a group of athletes created the Organizing Committee of the Pan American Games (COPAN); overlooked by Arturo L. Carrión Muñoz and Germán Rieckehoff, the committee made preparations to host the 1979 Games.

In 1973, the Puerto Rico Olympic Committee (COPUR) submitted a bid to PASO to host the games. The other bidding country Bolivia had withdrawn its bid, but San Juan still had to convince PASO that the city was able to host a successful event. In part to ensure that San Juan was the host of the games, Governor Rafael Hernandez Colon announced that the Puerto Rican government was willing to contribute up to $7 million to fund the 1979 Pan American Games.

=== Canceled bids ===
- Bolivia
