= Bids for the 1999 Pan American Games =

Overview
- XIII Pan American Games
- Winner: Winnipeg; Runner-up: Dominican Republic; Candidate: Bogotá

Details
- Committee: PASO
- Election venue: 32nd PASO General Assembly

Map
- Location of the bidding cities

Important dates
- Decision: Guayaquil, Ecuador; July 31, 1994

Decision
- Winner: Winnipeg (28 votes)
- Runner-up: Dominican Republic (22 votes)

Three cities submitted bids to host the 1999 Pan American Games. Voting took place on 31 July, 1994, in Guayaquil, Ecuador. Winnipeg, Santo Domingo, and Bogotá reached the final stage, and the assembly awarded Winnipeg the hosting rights following a deadlock.

As 1999 was the last year in the 20th century, a poetic layer was added to the bidding process as each city wanted to be the one to close out a century of American sports.

== Candidate cities ==
=== Winnipeg, Canada ===
In 1988, the Winnipeg delegation announced plans to submit a bid to host the games, which first enquired approval from the Canadian Olympic Association. On December 5, 1992, Winnipeg secured the Canadian bidding rights, defeating Toronto by one vote. Other three Canadian cities in the running were Halifax, Edmonton, and Sherbrooke.

Canadian bid process results
City	Round 1	Round 2	Round 3
Winnipeg	15	14	22
Toronto	17	21	21
Sherbrooke	10	10	—
Edmonton	3	—	—

=== Santo Domingo, Dominican Republic ===
Following the success of the 1986 Central American and Caribbean Games held in Santiago de los Caballeros, resident Dominican Republic Olympic Committee member Dr. José Joaquín Puello announced a 13-point "ten-year strategic plan," that would run from 1989 to 1999, ending with the city hosting the games. Plans for a Dominican host gained the support of President of the Pan American Sports Organization, Mario Vázquez Raña. On June 24, 1986, Raña urged Puello to submit a bid.

On June 21, 1994, President of the Dominican Republic Joaquín Balaguer issued Decree 181–94, declaring that it was,

"Of national interest to obtain the rights to host the 1999 Pan American Games in Santo Domingo and therefore, all the official authorities of the country are asked to give their collaboration to the Dominican Olympic Committee to achieve this objective."

During the final vote, Balaguer wrote to the Pan-American Games assembly in Guayaquil, stating, "We want, again, to be protagonists of history. Just as we were the land that opened the doors to American civilization, to conclude the century with the sports festival of the Continent."

=== Bogotá, Colombia ===
Bogotá officially presented their bid to the Pan American Sports Organization on March 9, 1993. Bogotá had never held the Pan American Games; however, nearby Cali held the 1971 Pan American Games. On November 16, 1993, Mayor Jaime Castro Castro was announced as the leader of Bogotá's hosting campaign during the 1993 Central American and Caribbean Games. Castro, under the slogan En Colombia todo está dispuesto (English: In Colombia, everything can happen), pitched to the Pan-American Sports Organization that the city has fulfilled commitments made to the international community, particularly in the sports field.

=== Preliminarily interested cities ===
In addition to the three cities who submitted finalist bids, thee other cities expressed interest in submitting bids, yet failed to do so. They are:

- Brasília, Brazil
- San Juan, United States
- Denver, United States

== Voting ==
In the Pan American Games, previous host nations are allowed to cast two votes. In 1999, this rule applied to Argentina, Brazil, Mexico, the United States, and Venezuela. Nations with bids to host the games - Canada, Colombia, and the Dominican Republic - were not allowed to vote.

=== Winnipeg's strategy ===
In an attempt to secure votes from Latin American delegates, the Canadian bid committee hired Uruguayan television host Carlos Garcia. Garcia, who lived in Toronto, was a well-known figure in Latin America and had existing relationships with several National Olympic Committee members. Additionally, the city presented an original song, written and performed by Burton Cummings, during its presentation.

Following the first round of voting, Bogotá was eliminated with 10 votes. During the second round, Winnipeg and Santo Domingo were tied with 25 votes. The tie was broken by Don Mackenzie, co-chairman of the Canadian bid. He convinced three delegates from the National Olympic Committee that Canada was the better choice, stating, "Santo Domingo had no place for water-skiing, but Portage la Prairie has one of the best water-skiing facilities in Canada." The next round, Winnipeg won, 28 to 22.

1999 Pan American Games bidding results
City	NOC	Round 1	Round 2	Round 3
Winnipeg	Canada	22	25	28
Santo Domingo	Dominican Republic	18	25	22
Bogotá	Colombia	10	—	—
