= Bids for the 2019 Pan American Games =

Bids for the 2019 Pan and Parapan American Games
Overview
- XVIII Pan American Games; VI Parapan American Games
- Winner: Lima; Candidate: Santiago · La Punta, San Luis · Ciudad Bolívar

Details
- Committee: PASO
- Election venue: Toronto, Canada; 51st PASO General Assembly

Map
- Location of the bidding cities

Important dates
- Bid: January 31, 2013
- Decision: October 11, 2013

Decision
- Winner: Lima (31 votes)

Four cities submitted bids to host the 2019 Pan American Games and Parapan games that were recognized by the Pan American Sports Organization (PASO), all four of which made the PASO Executive Committee's shortlist. PASO selected a host city for the 2019 Pan American Games at the Westin Harbour Castle Hotel in Toronto, Canada on October 11, 2013, which Lima won. The other shortlisted cities were Santiago, Chile, La Punta, Argentina, and Ciudad Bolívar, Venezuela.

Lima won an absolute majority of votes after just one round of voting, eliminating the need for subsequent rounds of voting. PASO delegates and the media identified a number of factors in its favor, including the size of the country, safety, experience in staging multi sporting events, government guarantees, security and cleanliness.

== Host city selection ==
On May 1, 2013, the National Olympic Committee (NOC) members of PASO were informed of the confirmation of the four candidate cities to host the 2019 Pan American Games. Each city was required to pay a deposit of $50,000 by that date, in which each one fulfilled, in order to continue with the election process. From April 30 to May 8, the Evaluation Commission carried out its visits to Ciudad Bolivar, La Punta, Santiago de Chile and Lima, in that order.

Lima was selected as the host city for the 2019 Pan American Games on October 11, 2013 by PASO at the Westin Harbour Castle Hotel in Toronto, Canada on October 11, 2013.

2019 Pan American Games bidding results
| City | NOC | Round 1 |
| Lima | Peru | 31 |
| Santiago | Chile | 9 |
| La Punta | Argentina | 9 |
| Ciudad Bolívar | Venezuela | 8 |

== Candidate cities overview ==
=== Candidate cities ===
| Logo | City | Country | National Olympic Committee | Result |
|---|---|---|---|---|
| | Lima | Peru | Peruvian Olympic Committee (COP) | Winner |
Lima 2019 was a successful bid for the 2019 Pan American Games by the president of the Peruvian Institute of Sport and the Peruvian Olympic Committee. The Pan American Village was planned to be located in El Callao, with a capacity of 9,000 people on 43 hectares (430,000 m^{2}) in 60 buildings. Lima had previously submitted a bid for the Pan American Games to host the 2015 Pan American Games, but lost out to Toronto. On the Olympic circuit, Peru hosted the 1990 South American Games, the 1947 Bolivarian Games, the 1997 Bolivarian Games, and the 2012 Bolivarian Beach Games.
| | Santiago | Chile | Chilean Olympic Committee (COCH) | First runner-up |
During the 2011 Pan American Games, the Chilean capital had been lobbying for these games, and stated their 2014 South American Games venues are being built to high Panamerican standards. Their interest was confirmed in March 2012 when the Secretary of Sports and the President of the Chilean Olympic Committee presented their bid at the Assembly of the Pan American Sports Organization. The city of Santiago proposed to have the 2019 Pan American Games held from October 8 to 25, and the city estimated a budget of US$658 million for funding the Games. The Pan American Village was planned to have 26 apartment buildings, shopping areas, a press and television center, pools and recreation areas, and 115,000 square meters of green areas. Although the bid failed, Santiago was elected to host the 2023 Pan American Games in 2017.
| | La Punta | Argentina | Argentine Olympic Committee (COA) | First runner-up |
On June 14, 2012, the Argentine Olympic Committee selected La Punta, San Luis to be put forward as Argentina's bidding city for the 2019 Pan American Games. The city was selected over Rosario by a vote of 30 to 20. La Punta aimed to hold the first fully sustainable Pan American Games, with the use of hybrid transport, wind and solar energy, and the "Plant Awareness, Plant a Tree" campaign, where each athlete competing in the Games would plant a tree. To that end, the Pan American Village was to be called the Pan American Green Village. The city's budget for the Games was to be split into three parts: sports infrastructure and the Green Village, refurbishment not related to sports facilities (such as airport and highways), and operation expenditure. In addition to La Punta's bid for the Pan American Games, Buenos Aires bid to host the 2018 Summer Youth Olympics and was elected as the host city on July 4, 2013.
| | Ciudad Bolívar | Venezuela | Venezuelan Olympic Committee (COV) | Third runner-up |
The city of Ciudad Bolívar proposed to hold the 2019 Pan American Games from September 20 to October 6, 2019, with the 2019 Parapan American games held from October 20 to November 30, citing that the city would be "surrounded by a landscape of lush beautiful greenery." With an estimated budget of US$1.5 billion (VEB 9.6 billion) for funding the Games, the city planned to develop the outskirts of the city, such as building world-class sports facilities, hotels, and the 292 hectares (1.13 sq mi) Pan American village. The village was expected to hold 12,000 athletes and officials and would have encompassed a total number of 68, five-story buildings, such as offices, stores, and gyms.

=== Candidate cities venues list ===
Note that the selected candidate cities may have slightly changed venues plan in the final proposal to PASO.

| Event | | Lima | Santiago | La Punta | Ciudad Bolívar |
| Event | | PER | CHI | ARG | VEN |
|---|---|---|---|---|---|
| Pan American Games dates | | 26 Jul – 11 Aug | 8 Oct – 25 Oct | October | 20 Sep – 6 Oct |
| Parapan American Games dates | | | | | 20 Oct – 30 Nov |
| Opening and closing ceremonies | | National Stadium of Peru | Chile National Stadium | | |
Aquatics
| Aquatics | Diving | Campus Marte | Chile National Stadium | Sports Theme Park | |
| Aquatics | Swimming | Campus Marte | Chile National Stadium | Sports Theme Park | |
| Aquatics | Synchronized swimming | Campus Marte | Chile National Stadium | Sports Theme Park | |
| Aquatics | Swimming (open) | Ring 1 (Callao) | | | |
| Aquatics | Water polo | Campus Marte | Chile National Stadium | Sports Theme Park | |
| Archery | | Lima Cricket and Football Club | Peñalolen Sports Park | Pan American Archery Venue | |
| Athletics | | Miguel Grau Complex | | | |
| Badminton | | Villa Deportiva Nacional | Centro de Entrenamiento Olímpico (CEO 1) | The Racquet Centre | |
| Basketball | | Eduardo Dibós Coliseum | El Salto Sports Center | Pan American Sports Stadium | |
| Boxing | | Miguel Grau Complex | Centro de Entrenamiento Olímpico (CEO 2) | Jose Maria Gatica Sports Venue (Villa Mercedes) | |
| Canoeing | | Ring 1 (Callao) | Lake Curauma | Florida Reservoir (San Luis Province) | |
Cycling
| Cycling | Cycling | Villa Deportiva Nacional | Velódromo Peñalolén | | |
| Cycling | Cycling (road) | Peru Highway 1 | Santiago Street Circuit | San Luis / La Punta Highway and Potrero de los Funes Circuit | |
| Cycling | Cycling (BMX) | New venue (San Juan de Lurigancho district) | Peñalolen Sports Park | Sports Theme Park | |
| Cycling | Mountain bike | Manchay (Pachacamac District) | Santiago Metropolitan Park | | |
Equestrian
| Equestrian | Dressage | Huachipa Equestrian Club | Quillota Equestrian Center | Estancia Grande Polo Club | |
| Equestrian | Eventing | Huachipa Equestrian Club | Quillota Equestrian Center | Estancia Grande Polo Club | |
| Equestrian | Jumping | Huachipa Equestrian Club | Quillota Equestrian Center | Estancia Grande Polo Club | |
| Fencing | | La Punta Coliseum | Chimkowe | | |
| Field hockey | | New venue | Estadio San Carlos de Apoquindo | Sports Theme Park | |
| Football | | Campus Marte | Estadio Elías Figueroa Brander | | |
| Golf | | Los Inkas Golf Club | San Cristóbal Polo and Riding Club | | |
| Gymnastics | | Villa Deportiva Nacional | Movistar Arena | Sports Centre C | |
| Handball | | Villa Deportiva Nacional | Chile National Stadium | Sports Stadium B | |
| Hockey | | Miraflores District | | | |
| Judo | | Sports Coliseum of the Catholic University of Peru | Viña del Mar Sports Center | Sports Theme Park | |
| Modern pentathlon | | Miguel Grau Complex | Chilean Military Academy | Sports Theme Park | |
| Rowing | | Ring 1 (Callao) | | Florida Reservoir (San Luis Province) | |
| Rugby 7 | | Newton College | High Performance Center (CARR) | | |
| Sailing | | Ring 1 (Callao) | Lake Curauma or Higuerillas Yacht Club | Florida Reservoir (San Luis Province) | |
| Shooting | | FAP Captain José Abelardo Quiñones González International Airport | Shooting Range | Pan American Shooting Range | |
| Table tennis | | Coliseum of the Peruvian-Chinese School John XXIII | Centro de Entrenamiento Olímpico (CEO 1) | Sports Theme Park | |
| Taekwondo | | Manuel Bonilla Stadium | Ramón Cruz Sports Center | | |
| Tennis | | Miraflores Las Terrazas Tennis Club | Chile National Stadium | Sports Theme Park | |
| Triathlon | | Near La Punta District | Viña del Mar Street Circuits | | |
Volleyball
| Volleyball | Beach Volley | Miraflores District | Peñalolen Sports Park | Pan American Beach Volleyball Stadium | |
| Volleyball | Indoor Volleyball | Coliseum of Lima | Playa Ancha Sports Club (Valparaíso) | | |
| Weightlifting | | Hotel Maria Angola (Miraflores District) | Ramón Cruz Sports Center | | |
| Wrestling | | Sports Coliseum of the Catholic University of Peru | Viña del Mar Sports Center | | |

- Italics indicate venue does not yet exist.

== Showed preliminary interest in bidding ==
- Bogotá, Colombia
- Puerto Rico

A number of cities had been mentioned as possible bids from Puerto Rico such as San Juan, Ponce, Mayagüez and Caguas.

- San Salvador, El Salvador
- Miami, United States

During the 2011 Pan American Games, United States Olympic Committee chief Scott Blackmun said that the United States would be interested in hosting the Pan American Games at some point. Miami had been mentioned as a potential bidder for the 2019 Games.

- Montevideo, Uruguay
