= Estádio Universitário São Paulo =

Stadium in São Paulo, Brazil

Coordinates: 23.559198°S 46.718395°W

Estádio Universitário São Paulo is a multi-use stadium located in São Paulo, Brazil. It was designed by architect Ícaro de Castro Mello in 1962 for the 1975 Pan American Games and inaugurated in 1971. As a homage to the Universiades it has a continuous two-level seating deck shaped as a crescent or a letter "U". Today it encompasses two side-a-side pitches used for football, rugby union matches. It hosts the home matches of University of São Paulo. The stadium has a de facto capacity of 30,000 people on concrete bleachers, but the exterior of the venue is no longer maintained, it no longer meets the operational requirements for attracting events, and the upper level has been indefinitely closed off.

== See also ==
- Great Strahov Stadium, another multi-pitch stadium
