= Bids for the 2015 Pan American Games =

Bids for the 2015 Pan and Parapan American Games
Overview
- XVII Pan American Games; V Parapan American Games
- Winner: Toronto; Runner-up: Lima; Candidate: Bogotá

Details
- Committee: PASO
- Election venue: Guadalajara, Mexico; 47th PASO General Assembly

Map
- Location of the bidding cities

Important dates
- Bid: October 11, 2008
- Decision: November 6, 2009

Decision
- Winner: Toronto (33 votes)
- Runner-up: Lima (11 votes)

Three cities submitted bids to host the 2015 Pan American Games and Parapan games that were recognized by the Pan American Sports Organization (PASO), all three of which made the PASO Executive Committee's shortlist. The games were awarded to Toronto, Canada on November 6, 2009. The other shortlisted cities were Lima, Peru and Bogotá, Colombia. Toronto won an absolute majority of votes after just one round of voting, eliminating the need for subsequent rounds of voting. PASO delegates and the media identified a number of factors in its favor, including the size of the country, safety, experience in staging multi sporting events, government guarantees, security, and cleanliness. Moreover, the other two nations are not as developed, and with the troubles faced with the 2011 Pan American Games, Toronto was seen as the favourite. Mario Vazquez Rana, the president of the Pan American Sports Organization was also known to be favouring Toronto. Moreover, the head of Lima's bid Ricardo Mungi even admitted Toronto was the best choice as they had the facilities and budget to stage the games.

== Host city selection ==
Because there is no longer a formal process of rotation between the 3 Regions of the Americas policy, and the previous games would have been held in Central America/Caribbean (2003), South America (2007), and North America (2011). It was suggested that bids from Canada or the United States may have an edge. The United States did not bid so as not to interfere with its ultimately unsuccessful 2016 Olympic bid. Nevertheless, South American candidates lobbied as heavily as Canada did.

On November 6, 2009 in Guadalajara, Mexico, the candidate cities made their final presentations to the Pan American Sports Organization (PASO). After the first round of ballots, the host was announced by PASO as Toronto.

2015 Pan American Games bidding results
City	NOC	Round 1
Toronto	Canada	33
Lima	Peru	11
Bogotá	Colombia	7

== Candidate cities ==
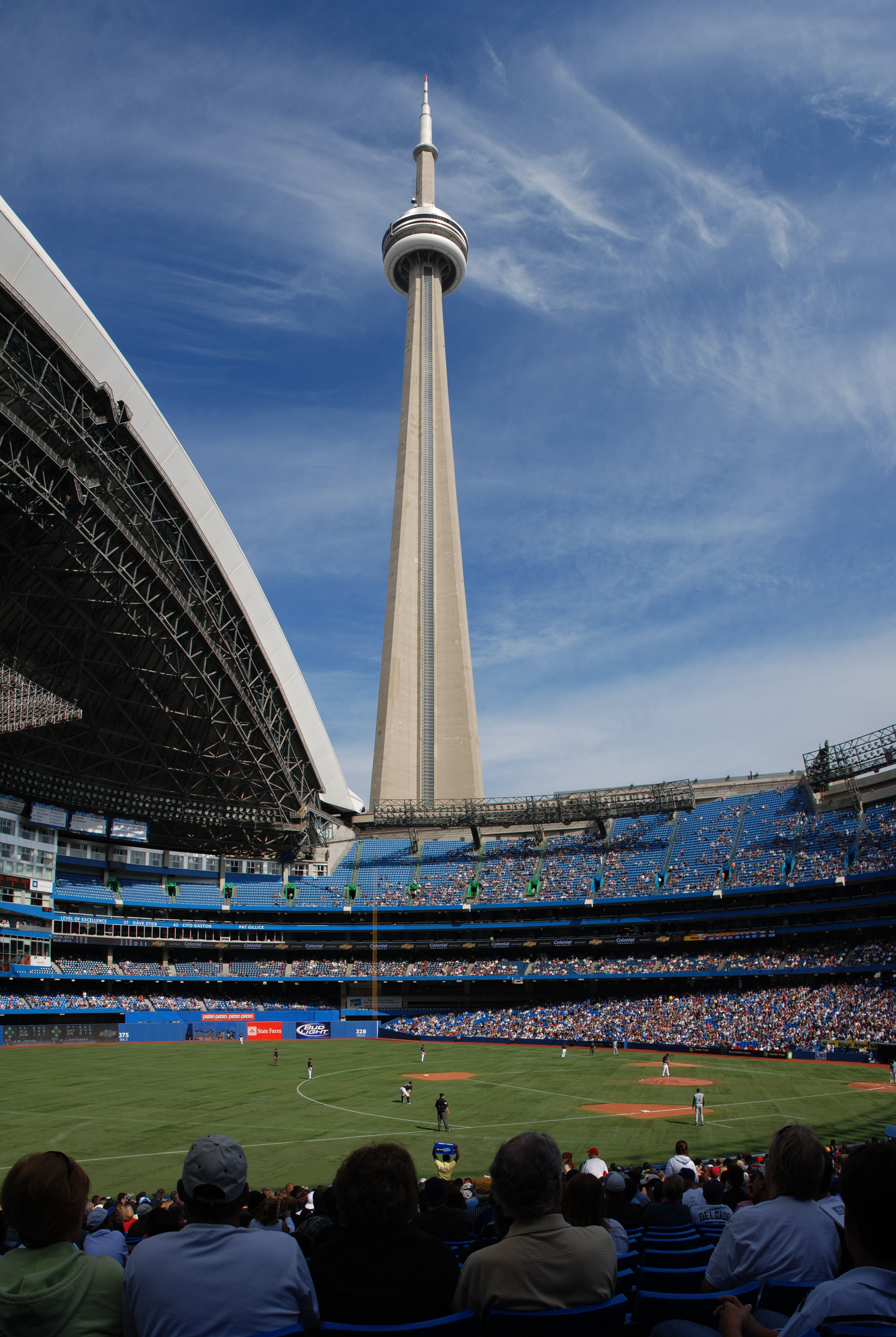
Rogers Centre, Toronto's proposed stadium to host the opening and closing ceremony

Logo	City	Country	National Olympic Committee	Result
	Toronto	Canada	Canadian Olympic Committee (COC)	Winner
Having twice bid for hosting the Olympic Games (unofficially six times since 1960), Toronto, along with other communities in the area known as the Greater Golden Horseshoe, bid for the 2015 Pan-American Games. The budget was set at $2.43 billion ($1.43 billion for the games and $1 billion for the village). The cost-sharing plan stipulated that Ontario and the federal government each contribute 35 per cent of the funding, or $500 million each. The city of Toronto, other hosting partners, and games revenue were expected to pay the remaining 30 per cent. All levels of government approved the bid. The federal government approved the bid on August 7, 2008. The new Hamilton stadium for athletics, situated on the waterfront harbour, that was included in the bid may have been a future venue for the Hamilton Tiger-Cats. St. Catharines had expressed interest in joining the bid, particularly due to their already-existing championship rowing facilities. Canadian Olympic Committee president Michael Chambers met with Pan American Sports Organization president Mario Vazquez Rana in January 2008 and was assured PASO had not unofficially anointed another candidate. Former Ontario Premier David Peterson had been appointed head of the bid committee. Performing in a voluntary capacity, he had experience as the head of Toronto's previous bids for the Olympics. The bid was formally launched on October 2, 2008; the bid head was Jagoda Pike. The bid logo was a maple leaf in green, red, and blue.
	Lima	Peru	Peruvian Olympic Committee (COP)	First runner-up
The capital of Peru also announced its candidacy at the 2007 Games. President of Peru Alan Garcia was enthusiastically pushing for upgraded sports infrastructure and athlete training. Should Peru not win the bid, they planned to pursue a bid for the 2019 edition and possibly the Olympics in the 2020s. after their defeat, Lima successfully bid for the next edition of the Pan Am games. The head of the Peruvian committee, Carlos Paz Soldan, said Peru deserved to host as a country which has never hosted before. Both of other two bid cities are in countries which had previously hosted. Authorities announced plans for construction of new sport facilities and the remodeling of existing ones, such as the 45,000 seat Estadio Nacional, which recently hosted the Copa América 2004.
	Bogotá	Colombia	Colombian Olympic Committee (COC)	Second runner-up
The capital city of Colombia coincided its announcement of candidacy at the 2007 Pan Am Games in Rio de Janeiro. Interference with the bid effort from the 2008 Andean diplomatic crisis between Colombia, Ecuador, and Venezuela seemed to have been averted. With a budget of $950 million if the bid was successful, Bogotá was touting its ideal year-round spring-like weather and its central geographical position in the Americas. Eighty percent of the required sporting facilities were already in place; new facilities would need to be built for tennis, track and field, and the Athletes' village. Also, the venues would be only six kilometers apart. Mayor Samuel Moreno Rojas also touted other cultural and sporting attractions in the city, which include over 50 museums and 313 km (194 mi). of bike paths. He did acknowledge Bogotá's altitude of 2,650 metres was a disadvantage. In sizing up the competition, Moreno added, "Toronto also has excellent infrastructure - they have an advantage on us in some aspects. But some venues there are 60 kilometres apart". If chosen, Bogotá would have become the second Colombian city to host a Pan American Games, after Cali (1971).
	Caracas	Venezuela	Venezuelan Olympic Committee (COV)	Canceled bid
This capital city hosted the 1983 Pan American Games and already has the Estadio Olímpico de la UCV in place. It announced its candidacy at the 2007 Games. President Hugo Chavez also endorsed the bid, but financial support was not guaranteed. On October 10 Caracas dropped out of the race without comment; PASO sources suggest they withdrew to avoid splitting the vote among three South American candidates.

== Showed preliminary interest ==
- Mar del Plata, Argentina

The city of Mar del Plata indicated preliminary interest in bidding for the games to mark the 20th anniversary of the 1995 Pan American Games held in the city. However, at the bidding deadline the city decided against bidding for the games.

- San Jose, Costa Rica

San Jose initially indicated an interest in bidding the games, in the end San Jose decided against bidding. If San Jose was successful, it would have become the first city to stage the Pan American Games in Central America.

- Birmingham, United States

As of April 2009, Birmingham mayor Larry Langford was discussing a bid, but the deadline to apply had already passed.

- Detroit, Miami or Chicago, United States

The United States showed preliminary interest in bidding with one of three cities (Chicago, Miami or Detroit). However, the country decided to not bid for the games, because it decided to bid for the 2016 Summer Olympics with Chicago.
