= Bids for the 1983 Pan American Games =

Overview
- IX Pan American Games
- Winner: Caracas; Runner-up: Hamilton; Candidate: Havana · Santiago

Details
- Committee: PASO

Map
- Location of the bidding cities

Important dates
- Bid: March 21, 1977
- Decision: April 23, 1977

Decision
- Winner: Caracas
- Runner-up: Hamilton

Four cities submitted bids to host the 1983 Pan American Games that were recognized by the Pan American Sports Organization (PASO); however, only one city, Hamilton submitted their bid on time. On April 23, 1977, Caracas, Venezuela was selected over Hamilton, Canada in a two-city vote to host the IX Pan American Games by the PASO at its general assembly in San Juan, Puerto Rico.

== Host city selection ==
By the rotational system rule, it was a country from the Central America and Caribbean zone's turn to host the games. With Venezuela being such a country, the Venezuelan Olympic Committee argued that Canada had no right to bid for the 1983 Games for this reason. However, the deadline to submit a bid was March 21, and Venezuela entered its bid 30 days late; this situation was not covered in the PASO regulations.

The PASO approved a recommendation to hold an open vote for the bids from Hamilton and Caracas. A total of 28 of the 33 countries took place in the vote; the exact results of the vote were not released.

== Candidate cities ==
=== Caracas, Venezuela ===
Venezuela entered its bid for the 1983 Games thirty days after the official deadline for entries. Had the city submitted its bid on time, a vote would not have been necessary, as it would have been the only eligible city to host the Games, due to rotation regulations. Even so, many believed that Caracas still had the greatest chance of winning.

=== Hamilton, Canada ===
Hamilton submitted its bid offer to the Canadian Olympic Committee (COC) to be the Canadian host city in early April 1976. Canada was not happy with the recent 1976 Summer Olympics in Montreal. "The Montreal Olympics left a very bad taste because of its huge cost ... we want to prove that the Pan American Games can be held at a minimum cost," said Mayor John A. McDonald. The cost to host the 1983 Games in Hamilton would have been around $60 million; a contribution of $17 million each from the commonwealth and provincial government was expected to help with funding. Hamilton had previously hosted the (inaugural) 1930 Commonwealth Games.

The city would have held 19 sports from July 16 to August 1, 1983. The main venue would have been the $32 million Ontario Sports Training Center, which was undergoing construction. The Pan American Village was going to be located at the same site as the 1977 Canadian Wrestling Championship, an event the city was already planning to host.

In April 1977, Venezuela made a request to Canada to withdraw their bid for the Games, in which the Canadian government rejected. Earlier, in January of that year, the Hamilton's Games committee sent a telegram to the Venezuelan government, offering to drop the Hamilton bid if Venezuela wanted to bid. Venezuela sent no reply to the telegram, and did not enter a bid until after the PASO deadline.

=== Havana, Cuba ===
Cuba's late application for Havana to be the host city of the 1983 Games was made by an official of the Cuban Olympic Committee (COC) to PASO President Mario Vázquez Raña by a long-distance phone call.

=== Santiago, Chile ===
Santiago did not meet the deadline for application, but was still eligible to be in the running for host city.
