= Bids for the 2003 Pan American Games =

Overview
- XIV Pan American Games
- Winner: Santo Domingo; Runner-up: Guadalajara; Candidate: Medellín

Details
- Committee: PASO
- Election venue: Panama City, Panama; 36th PASO General Assembly

Map
- Location of the bidding cities

Important dates
- Decision: December 6, 1998

Decision
- Winner: Santo Domingo (28 votes)
- Runner-up: Guadalajara (24 votes)

Three cities submitted bids to host the 2003 Pan American Games that were recognized by the Pan American Sports Organization. Santo Domingo was selected by PASO to host the XIV Pan American Games in the second round of voting on December 6, 1998, at its general assembly held in Panama City, Panama.

== Host city selection ==
Medellín was eliminated in the first round, as 26 votes were needed to win. Santo Domingo won the majority vote in the first and second rounds with 24 votes and 28 votes, respectively.

2003 Pan American Games bidding results
City	NOC	Round 1	Round 2
Santo Domingo	Dominican Republic	24	28
Guadalajara	Mexico	21	24
Medellín	Colombia	6	—

== Bidding cities ==
=== Santo Domingo, Dominican Republic ===
Following the 1986 Central American and Caribbean Games held in Santiago de los Caballeros, President of the Dominican Republic Olympic Committee Dr. José Joaquín Puello announced a 13-point "ten-year plan," from 1989 to 1999, in which the last point was to hold the Pan American Games. The country gained support of President of the Pan American Sports Organization Mario Vázquez Raña following thereafter; on June 24, 1986 Raña urged Puello to bid for Pan American Games. Santo Domingo had submitted a bid for the 1999 Pan American Games, but lost to Winnipeg by six votes after a tight voting.

Santo Domingo's campaign to host the 2003 Games focused on the fact that the smaller countries can host the event, using the slogan Los Pequeños También Pueden (English: The little ones can also), and it proved to be effective. Puello also gained the support of newly-elected the then president Leonel Fernandez, even though broad sectors rejected the bid project.

In the first round of voting, Medellín was eliminated. Santo Domingo and Medellín had an informal agreement that if one of the two cities was eliminated in the first round, they would make a campaign for the other in the second. Santo Domingo won in the second round.

=== Guadalajara, Mexico ===
In 1996, Mayor César Coll Carabias launched the first ever candidacy for Guadalajara to host the 2003 Pan American Games. Guadalajara had most of the sports venues necessary and a wealth of experience in organizing multi-sport events. Additionally, the then president of the Pan American Sports Organization Mario Vázquez Raña supported the city. In an effort to gain support for Guadalajara, Mexican delegates had offered to give about $51,000 to each of the 41 National Olympic Committees to be used for training programs for athletes. The Colombian delegation responded to this by accusing Mexico of bribery. Guadalajara lost to Santo Domingo in the second round.

=== Medellín, Colombia ===
Medellín had boasted an excellent climate condition, as well as the fact that most of the facilities that would have been necessary already existed, but due the colombian internal drug owners conflicts, the security considerations were a major concern. the then General Rosso José Serrano attempted to alleviate concerns over safety in Medellín. Medellín was eliminated was eliminated in the first round of voting. Keeping their promise to vote for Santo Domingo if they were eliminated in the first round, after the elimination, the colombian city make your campaign for Santo Domingo in the second.

== Showed preliminary interest ==
- Santiago, Chile

Santiago did show interest in hosting the 2003 Games, but in June 1998, the city decided not to further any attempt for hosting the games.
