= Bids for the 1959 Pan American Games =

Overview
- III Pan American Games
- Winner: Cleveland

Details
- Committee: PASO

Map
- Location of the bidding cities

Important dates
- Decision: March 11, 1955

Decision
- Winner: Cleveland

One city initially submitted a bid to host the 1959 Pan American Games that was recognized by the Pan American Sports Organization (PASO), along with three cities that withdrew their bids. On March 11, 1955, at the IV Pan American Congress in Mexico City, PASO selected Cleveland unanimously to host the III Pan American Games.

On April 15, 1957, Cleveland asked PASO to be relieved of their assignment as the host city. Subsequently, both Guatemala City and Rio de Janeiro informed PASO that they would not be able to host the games either. Two cities came forward as candidates host the games, Chicago and São Paulo, and on August 3, 1957, Chicago was selected over São Paulo by a vote of 13 to 6.

== First host city selection ==
On March 11, 1955, PASO decided by unanimous vote to hold the games in Cleveland city after Guatemala, Chile, and Brazil withdrew the proposals they had presented to be held in their respective countries. At the same time, the committee decided that the 1963 Pan American Games would be held in a city in Latin America.

=== Candidate cities ===
- Cleveland, United States

=== Withdrew bid ===
Guatemala City, Rio de Janeiro, and Santiago all withdrew their accepted bids prior to the final voting date.

- Guatemala City, Guatemala
- Rio de Janeiro, Brazil
- Santiago, Chile

=== Interested cities ===
Detroit, Houston, and Los Angeles showed interest in holding the Games.

- Detroit, United States
- Houston, United States
- Los Angeles, United States

== Cleveland is forced to withdraw ==
As Cleveland was making all the necessary preparations to hold the 1959 Games, all of the various sporting venues were approved. It was estimated that the total cost for all the new facilities would be $11 million. In order to fund the games, the financing plan proposed that $2 million would be obtained from the City of Cleveland, $3 million from Cuyahoga County, $1 million from the State of Ohio, and $5 million from the United States Federal Government.

By early 1957, the city, county, and state all approved the proposed funding, but the Federal Government had yet to approve the funding. The United States was making a movement to reduce taxes by imposing a restriction on the national budget; because of this, it became abundantly clear that Cleveland would not receive the funding necessary to build the required facilities. On March 15, 1957, the PASO organized a special session of the Congress of the Pan American Sports Organization in Caracas, Venezuela. In this meeting, the organization set a deadline of May 1, 1957 for Cleveland to show that it would have all of its finances in order. It was also at this meeting that PASO approved Guatemala City to be the first alternate and Rio de Janeiro to be the second alternate, should Cleveland be forced to withdraw its hosting rights. On April 15, 1957, Cleveland was forced to ask PASO to be relieved of its assignment as host city.

The Pan American Sports Organization asked Guatemala City to be the new host city for the Games, but on May 15, 1957, Roberto Castaneda, an assistant to President of Guatemala Carlos Castillo Armas, informed PASO at a meeting in Caracas that, due to a national election that was scheduled to be held in Spring 1959 and the fact that the city would need a $5 million grant in order to host the games, they would not be able to be the host city, either.

Shortly thereafter, Rio de Janeiro also informed PASO that they would not be able to host the games.

Bids for the 1959 Pan American Games
Overview
- III Pan American Games
- Winner: Chicago; Runner-up: São Paulo

Details
- Committee: PASO

Map
- Location of the bidding cities

Important dates
- Decision: August 3, 1957

Decision
- Winner: Chicago (13 votes)
- Runner-up: São Paulo (6 votes)

== Second host city selection ==
On August 3, 1957, the II Special Congress of the Pan American Sports Organization was called in San Jose, Costa Rica to decide on whether Chicago or São Paulo would host the III Pan American Games. Nineteen of the twenty-five nations of PASO attended the Congress. Chicago won the games over São Paulo by a vote of thirteen to six.

=== Candidate cities ===
- Chicago, United States

As soon as Cleveland made it official that they would relinquish their hosting rights, Mayor of Chicago Richard J. Daley expressed an interest in holding the Games. On July 29, 1957, in an effort to ensure that the Cleveland situation would not repeat itself, President of United States Olympic Committee (USOC) Kenneth L. Wilson and his Olympic Survey Committee chose Chicago over Philadelphia as the host city candidate for the United States.

At the II Special Congress, Chicago was represented by Michael J. McDermott, Chairman of the Chicago Organizing Committee, Alderman Ralph Metcalfe, and Jack Reilly, special aid to Mayor Richard J. Daley.

- São Paulo, Brazil

=== Interested cities ===
Philadelphia and Montevideo showed interest in holding the Games after Cleveland redacted their hosting rights.

- Philadelphia, United States
- Montevideo, Uruguay
