= Bids for the 1995 Pan American Games =

Overview
- XII Pan American Games
- Winner: Mar del Plata

Details
- Committee: PASO

Map
- Location of the bidding cities

Important dates
- Decision: October 1989

Decision
- Winner: Mar del Plata

One city submitted a bid to host the 1995 Pan American Games that was recognized by the Pan American Sports Organization (OPEPA). Honoring an agreement that was made after Mar del Plata withdrew their bid for the 1991 Pan American Games, OPEDA selected Mar del Plata as the host city for the 1995 games at the ODEPA Assembly in Havana, Cuba in October 1989.

== Host city selection ==
1995 Pan American Games bidding results
City	NOC	Round 1
Mar del Plata	Argentina	Unanimous

== Candidate cities ==
=== Mar del Plata, Argentina ===
In 1986, at the ODEPA Assembly in Barbados, Mar del Plata was bidding against Havana, Cuba to host the 1991 Pan American Games. Mar del Plata argued that, due to PASO regulations, Havana was not eligible to host the games, since Central America's turn to host the games was in 1987. However, due to bid withdrawals, Indianapolis hosted the 1987. Cuba responded by threatening to boycott the 1987 Games if they were not awarded that 1991 games. This would have been an issue, as Cuba was the second-largest contender in the Pan Am Games.

As tensions grew between the committees, president of the Puerto Rico Olympic Committee, Germán Rieckehoff asked Mar del Plata if they would consider withdrawing their bid, noting that Argentina hosted the inaugural Pan American games, and Cuba had never held the games. To avoid discord in the Pan American unity, the Argentina Committee withdrew their bid in favor of Havana, understanding the reasoning of the Cuban community. Following the withdrawal, ODEPA promised to award Mar del Plata the 1995 Pan American Games; in October 1989 at the OPEDA Assembly in Havana, the agreement was honored, and Mar del Plata was awarded the 1995 Games in a unanimous vote.

== Legacy ==
Argentina's act to avoid a rift and preserve unity between the Pan American nations was cemented in history. On September 26, 2002, The Honorable Deliberative Council (HCD) unanimously approved sanction file DE 12024-4-2002, Ordanance No. 14910, establishing November 14 as "Pan American Friendship Day," signed by the President of the HCD Gustavo Pulti and promulgated by Intendant Daniel Katz on October 9, 2002.
