= Bids for the 1991 Pan American Games =

Overview
- XI Pan American Games
- Winner: Havana

Details
- Committee: PASO

Map
- Location of the bidding cities

Important dates
- Decision: November 14, 1986

Decision
- Winner: Havana

Havana, Cuba was the only non-withdrawn bid to host the 1991 Pan American Games. At the Pan American Games (PASO ) Assembly, from November 12 to 14, 1986, in Bridgetown, Barbados, Mar del Plata withdrew its bid, leaving Havana as the winner to host the Games.

== Host city selection ==
1991 Pan American Games bidding results
City	NOC	Round 1
Havana	Cuba	Unanimous

== Candidate cities ==
=== Havana, Cuba ===
After Santiago, Chile in 1983, and then subsequently Quito, Ecuador in 1984, forfeited being the host for the 1987 Pan American Games, Havana and Indianapolis presented themselves as candidates to hold the 1987 Games. In November 1984, the PASO General Assembly met in Mexico and voted Indianapolis as the host for the 1987 games. The United States Olympic Committee promised to not submit a bid for the 1991 Games, and them, along with PASO, guaranteed to support the Cuban candidacy to organize the 1991 Games.

In 1986, at the PASO Assembly in Barbados, Mar del Plata argued that, due to PASO regulations, Havana was not eligible to host the 1991 Games, since Central America's turn to host the games was in 1987. Cuba responded by threatening to boycott the 1987 Games if they were not awarded that 1991 games. This would have been an issue, as Cuba was the second-largest contender in the Pan Am Games.

As tensions grew between the committees, president of the Puerto Rico Olympic Committee, Germán Rieckehoff asked Mar del Plata if they would consider withdrawing their bid, noting that Argentina hosted the inaugural Pan American games, and Cuba had never held the games. To avoid discord in the Pan American unity, the Argentina Committee withdrew their bid in favor of Havana, understanding the reasoning of the Cuban community.

=== Withdrew bid ===
- Mar del Plata, Argentina

On September 10, 1986, the Argentine Olympic Committee selected Mar del Plata to be the representing city of Argentina for the 1991 Pan American Games over Córdoba and Rosario by a vote of 24 to 2 to 1, respectively. The city withdrew their bid at the PASO Assembly of 1986, allowing Havana to be the only city in contention to host the games.

- London, Canada

In early 1985, the Canadian Olympic Committee selected London, Ontario over Hamilton, Ontario as the host city to represent Canada. In June 1985, London withdrew from the bid process due to the federal government prohibiting all funding from any international multi-sport events (aside from the 1988 Calgary Winter Olympics).

== Showed preliminary interest ==
- Indianapolis, United States

Indianapolis was planning on bidding for the 1991 Games, but after the 1987 Games were without a host, the city decided to bid for, and ended up winning, those games instead.
