= Bids for the 2023 Pan American Games =

Bids for the 2023 Pan and Parapan American Games
Overview
- XIX Pan American Games; VII Parapan American Games
- Winner: Santiago

Details
- Committee: PASO
- Election venue: Prague, Czech Republic; 55th PASO General Assembly

Map
- Location of the bidding cities

Important dates
- Bid: February 1, 2017
- Decision: November 4, 2017

Decision
- Winner: Santiago

PASO received two bids to host the 2023 Pan American Games and Parapan games from Santiago, Chile and Buenos Aires, Argentina. Later in the bidding process, Buenos Aires withdrew their bid, leaving Santiago as the sole bidder. Santiago was elected as the host city on November 4, 2017. PASO originally intended to hold the host city election in Lima, Peru which would also be the venue of the 55th PASO General Assembly, but moved the venue to Prague, Czech Republic, the venue of the 22nd ANOC General Assembly to allow Peru to focus on Pan American Games preparations.

== Candidate cities ==
- Santiago, Chile

The Chilean Olympic Committee (COCH) presented a last minute bid on January 31, 2017, right before the deadline to submit bids. Neven Ilic, president of the COCh, said the bid would use the 2014 South American Games as base. Santiago bid to host the 2019 Pan American Games, and was awarded the 1975 and 1987 Pan American Games but both times financial difficulties and political problems forced the organizers to withdraw. Santiago was selected to host the 2023 Pan American Games on November 4, 2017.

== Cancelled bids ==
- Buenos Aires, Argentina

The Argentine Olympic Committee confirmed Buenos Aires' bid on January 27, 2017, after president Mauricio Macri and chief of government Horacio Rodríguez Larreta signed supporting letters. Rosario or Mar del Plata would host some open water events. The Argentine capital hosted the first Pan American Games, the 2006 South American Games and the 2018 Summer Youth Olympics. However, on April 21, 2017, the Argentine Olympic Committee withdrew the Buenos Aires bid, leaving Santiago as the only candidate city. Werthein told reporters, "I would like Argentina to present its Olympic candidacy for 2032, but for now I’m only thinking about (the PanAm Games in) 2027 ... The budget necessary to organize the Pan American Games was $650 million... It’s too much for this moment in Argentina."

== Showed preliminary interest in bidding ==
Other cities in Argentina, Brazil, Colombia and Puerto Rico expressed interest in bidding but failed to submit bids when applications were due.

- Mar del Plata, Argentina
- Rosario, Argentina
- São Paulo, Brazil
- Cali, Colombia
- Medellín, Colombia
- Bogotá, Colombia
- San Juan, Puerto Rico
