= Bids for the 1963 Pan American Games =

Overview
- IV Pan American Games
- Winner: São Paulo; Runner-up: Winnipeg

Details
- Committee: PASO

Map
- Location of the bidding cities

Important dates
- Decision: August 25, 1959

Decision
- Winner: São Paulo (18 votes)
- Runner-up: Winnipeg (5 votes)

For the first time, two cities submitted bids to host the 1963 Pan American Games that were recognized by the Pan American Sports Organization (PASO). On August 25, 1959, São Paulo was selected over Winnipeg to host the IV Pan American Games by the PASO at the VII Pan American Sports Congress in Chicago, United States.

== Host city selection ==
Twenty-three countries took place in the vote; with a total of eighteen votes against five, the Brazilian city won the right to host the 1963 Pan American Games.

1963 Pan American Games bidding results
City	NOC	Round 1
São Paulo	Brazil	18
Winnipeg	Canada	5

== Candidate cities ==
=== São Paulo, Brazil ===
São Paulo had lost its bid to hold the 1959 Pan American Games to Chicago by a vote of 13 to 6 on August 3, 1957; because of this, many believed that São Paulo would receive overwhelming support to hold the 1963 Games. The Organizing and Executive Committee, headed by Sylvio de Magalhães Padilha, announced its intent to bid for the 1963 Games in 1958.

=== Winnipeg, Canada ===
On February 8, 1958, Mayor of Winnipeg Stephen Juba announced that Winnipeg would be bidding for the Games, noting that the games have been moving further north with each edition, and Canada would be the next logical step. Juba and athlete Doug Groff made presented Winnipeg's bid along with their 12-man delegation.

After failing to secure their bid, Juba was convinced that "São Paulo was given some sort of assurance" that the Brazilian city would hold the 1957 Games. In the same manner, the PASO was on record stating that Canada was in serious contention to hold the 1967 Pan American Games—an event that Winnipeg ultimately hosted.
