= Bids for the 1967 Pan American Games =

Overview
- V Pan American Games
- Winner: Winnipeg; Candidate: Caracas · Santiago

Details
- Committee: PASO

Map
- Location of the bidding cities

Important dates

Decision
- Winner: Winnipeg

Three cities submitted bids to host the 1967 Pan American Games that were recognized by the Pan American Sports Organization (PASO). On April 22, 1963, Winnipeg was selected over Caracas and Santiago to host the V Pan American Games by the PASO at its general assembly in São Paulo, Brazil.

== Host city selection ==
The host city selection was set to be made prior to the opening ceremonies of the 1963 Pan American Games in São Paulo, but the voting was delayed until Monday April 22. The Metropolitan Corporation of Greater Winnipeg (Metro) was expected to assist in Winnipeg's finances for the Games, but backed out right before the vote was to take place. Mayor of Winnipeg Stephen Juba believed that Metro attempted to ruin Winnipeg's bid for the Games and that was why the voting was delated, stating, "They can say all they want, but they deliberately tried to scuttle our bid on the eve of the departure of our delegation to Brazil ... When this got in the papers as 'the largest Greater Winnipeg municipality backing out' you can bet that’s why the Pan-American congress delayed a decision on the site for 1967."

Winnipeg went on to win the games. The results of the voting were not released.

== Candidate cities ==
=== Winnipeg, Canada ===
The countries that made up the PASO assured Winnipeg that the city would host the 1967 Games after the city failed to secure the hosting rights of the 1963 Pan American Games – an event that São Paulo claimed. The same committee that organized the bid for those games worked to create a better bid for the 1967 Games.

The Citizens Committee estimated that the total net cost to hold the games in Winnipeg at $4.5 million. The Government of Canada, the Government of Manitoba, and Greater Winnipeg were expected to cover one-third of the costs each.

The main sporting venues were the Winnipeg Stadium and Winnipeg Arena, which were to host the opening and closing ceremonies, track events, soccer, basketball, and possibly more. Ontario also purchased the Grand Beach Provincial Park from Canadian Natural Resources in hopes that it could be renovated to a point that it could host the sailing events, and after the games, it could be used for public use. Additionally, organizers hoped to purchase Whiteshell Provincial Park for the tennis matches and Falcon Lake for rowing. Other venues included the Oshawa Civic Auditorium, Minto Armoury, Assiniboia Downs, and University of Manitoba. Additionally, the Pan American Village would be located in the Fort Osborne Barracks, which would be centered around the new $25 million addition known as the Selkirk Lines.

=== Santiago, Chile ===
On March 18, 1963, authorities announced that Santiago had bid for the 1967 Games.

== Interested cities ==
=== Miami and Kansas City, United States ===
On February 12, 1963, the United States Olympic Committee (USOC) gave permission to Miami and Kansas City to bid for the 1963 Pan American Games. Since the United States was bidding of the 1968 Summer and Winter Olympics, the country was allowed to have more than one bidding city apply to host the Games.
