= Bids for the 1975 Pan American Games =

Overview
- VII Pan American Games
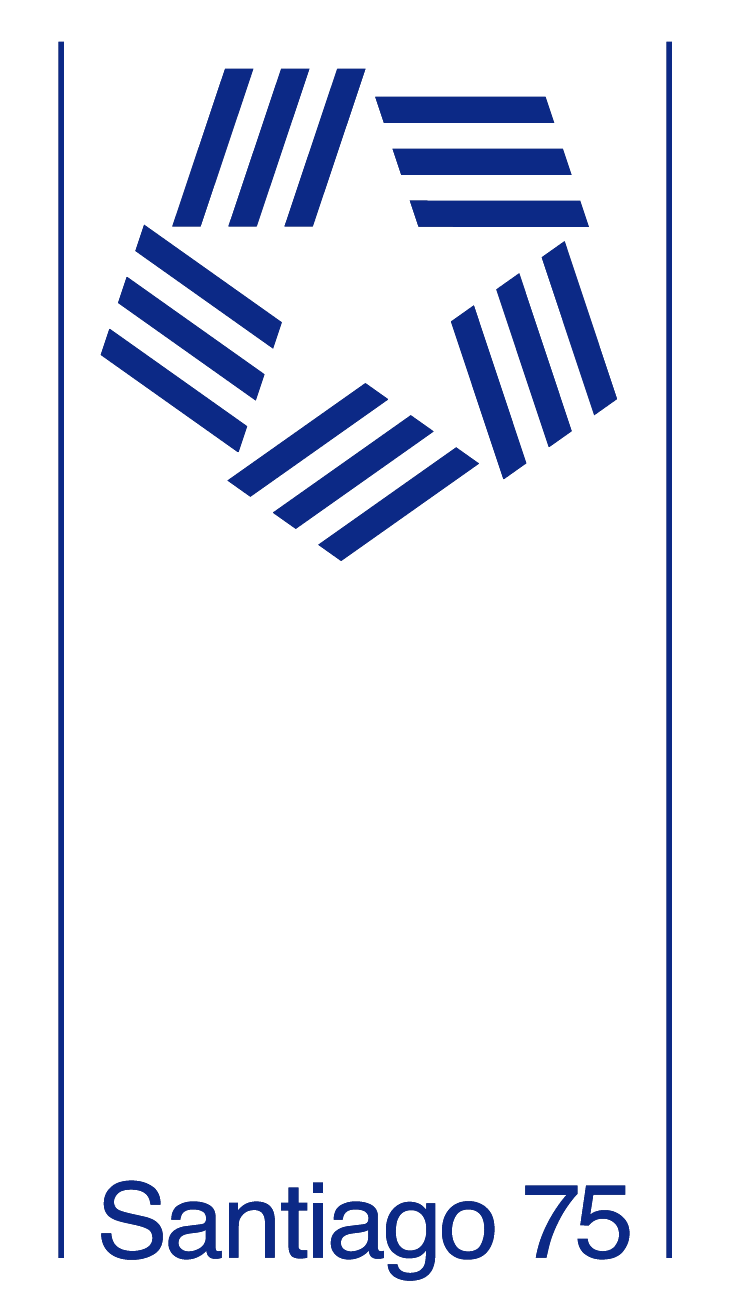
- Winner: Santiago; Runner-up: San Juan, Puerto Rico

Details
- Committee: PASO

Map
- Location of the bidding cities

Important dates

Decision
- Winner: Santiago (27 votes)
- Runner-up: San Juan, Puerto Rico (0 votes)

Two cities submitted bids to host the 1975 Pan American Games, which were recognized by the Pan American Sports Organization. On August 29, 1969, Santiago was selected unanimously over San Juan to host the VII Pan American Games by PASO at its 10th general assembly, held in Cali, Colombia.

In 1973, Santiago dropped out from hosting, and in 1974, its replacement São Paulo did the same. Mexico City was granted the hosting rights with just 10 months to prepare.

== Host city selection ==
Twenty-seven countries took part in the vote.

1975 Pan American Games bidding results
City	NOC	Round 1
Santiago	Chile	27
San Juan	Puerto Rico	0

== Candidate cities ==
=== Santiago, Chile ===
This bid marked the fourth time that Santiago had bid to host the Pan American Games—first in São Paulo, then in Mexico, and most recently, in Winnipeg.

=== San Juan, Puerto Rico ===
It was generally understood that San Juan would not host the 1975 Pan American Games; as such, President of the Puerto Rico Olympic Committee Felicio Terregrosa asked to be the alternate host city, should Santiago back out. Puerto Rico's bid was presented extemporaneously.

== Mexico City hosts the games ==
In 1973, due to unstable political and financial reasons mainly due to the military coup of Augusto Pinochet, Santiago declined to organize the games. The runner-up San Juan had already been awarded the 1979 Pan American Games, so they declined to host the games. São Paulo, Brazil took over as the host city but was forced to give up because of a meningitis epidemic that swept Brazil in 1974.

After São Paulo dropped out, President Luis Echeverría Álvarez informed President of the Mexican Olympic Committee (COM) Mario Vázquez Raña that Mexico City was authorized to host the games in an on an emergency basis. The committee then informed PASO that the city would host the games, if as no other countries or city are interested. With just 10 months until the Pan American Games, the PASO announced that Mexico City would serve as the host city.
