= Pan American Games =

Multi-sport event of the Americas

- 1951; 1955; 1959; 1963; 1967; 1971; 1975; 1979; 1983; 1987; 1991; 1995; 1999; 2003; 2007; 2011; 2015; 2019; 2023; 2027

Pan American Games
- Abbreviation: Pan Am Games
- Purpose: Multi-sport event for nations in the American continents
- Frequency: Every four years
- Inaugurated: 1951 Pan American Games in Buenos Aires, Argentina
- Most recent: 2023 Pan American Games in Santiago, Chile
- Next event: 2027 Pan American Games in Lima, Peru

The Pan American Games, known as the Pan Am Games, is a continental multi-sport event in the Americas first held in 1951. It features thousands of athletes participating in competitions to win different summer sports. It is held among athletes from nations across the Americas, every four years, the year before Summer Olympics. It is the second-oldest continental games in the world. The only Winter Pan American Games were held in 1990. In 2021, the Junior Pan American Games was held for the first time specifically for young athletes. The Pan American Sports Organization is the governing body of the Pan American Games movement, whose structure and actions are defined by the Olympic Charter.

The most recent event was the XIX Pan American Games, held in Santiago from 20 October to 5 November 2023. The XX Pan American Games will be held in 2027. Since the XV Pan American Games in 2007, host cities are contracted to manage both the Pan American and Parapan American Games, in which athletes with physical disabilities compete with one another. As the Paralympic Games, the Parapan American Games are held immediately following the Pan American Games.

The Pan American Games Movement consists of international sports federations, National Olympic Committees recognized by PASO, and organizing committees for each specific Pan American Games. As the decision-making body, PASO is responsible for choosing the host city for each Pan American Games. The host city is responsible for organizing and funding a celebration of the Games consistent with the Olympic Charter and rules. The Pan-Am Games program, consisting of the sports to be contested at the Games, is determined by PASO. The celebration of the Games encompasses many rituals and symbols, such as the flag and torch, and the opening and closing ceremonies. Over 5,000 athletes compete at the Pan American Games in 36 sports and nearly 400 events. The first, second, and third-place finishers in each event receive gold, silver, and bronze medals, respectively.

== History ==
=== Early games ===
The idea of holding a Pan American Games was first raised at the 1932 Summer Olympics in Los Angeles, where Latin American representatives of the International Olympic Committee (IOC) suggested that a competition among all the countries in the Americas should be created. During the Pan-American Exposition at Dallas in 1937, a limited sports program was staged. These included athletics, boxing and wrestling, among others. This program was considered a success and a meeting of Olympic officials from the Americas was held.

At the first Pan American Sports Congress, held in Buenos Aires in 1940, the participants decided that the first games should be held in Buenos Aires in 1942. The plans had to be postponed because of World War II. A second Pan American Sports Congress held in London during the 1948 Summer Olympics reconfirmed Buenos Aires as the choice of host city for the inaugural games, which were held in 1951. The games began on February 25 of that year, and offered 18 sports. Countries and territories that were part of the Commonwealth of Nations such as Canada did not compete at the first Pan American Games. The second games were held in Mexico City, Mexico. Competitions started on March 12 and included 2,583 athletes from 22 countries, competing in 17 sports. The Pan American Games have subsequently been held every four years.

=== Recent games ===
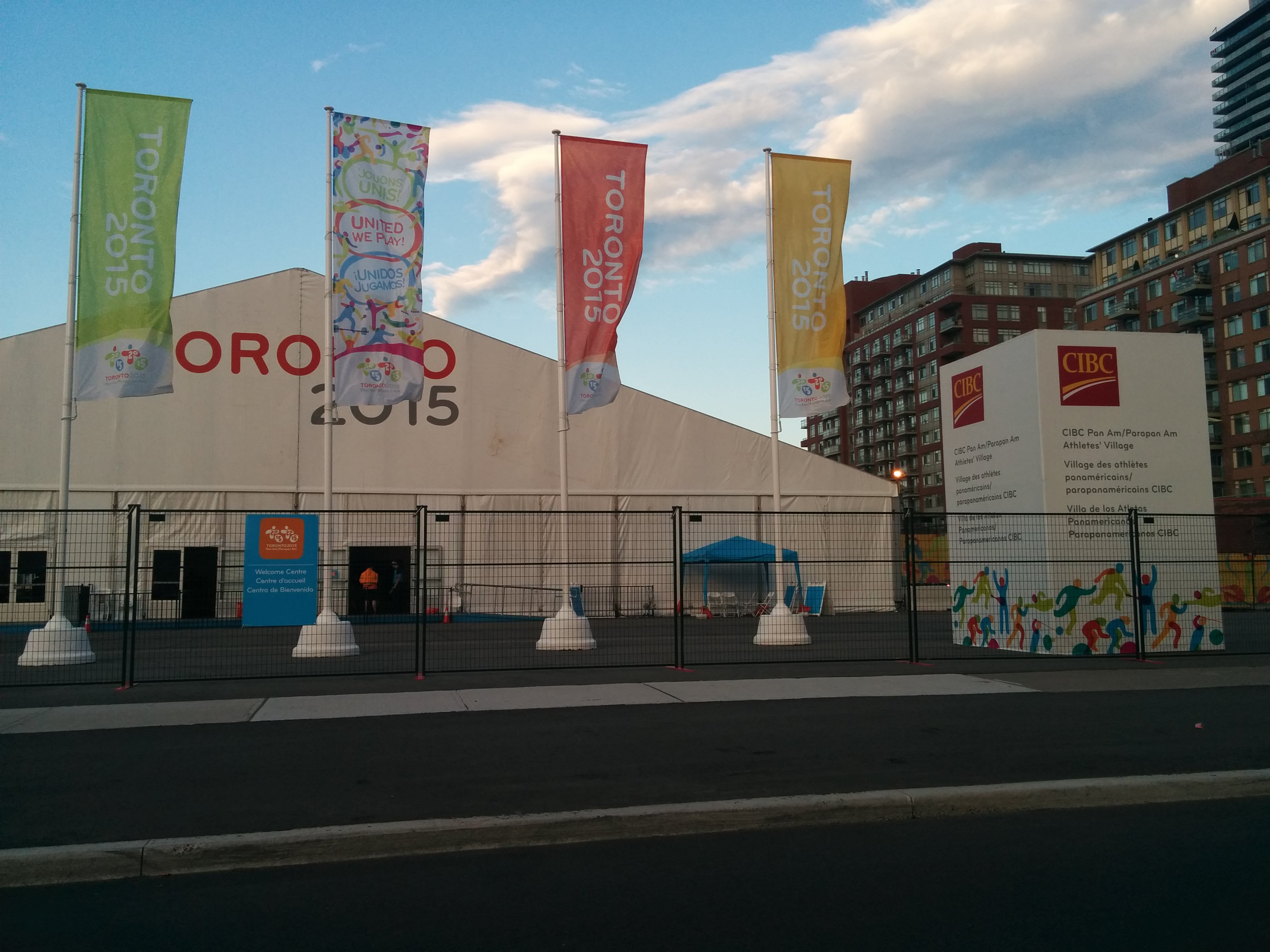
The welcome centre at the 2015 Pan American Games athletes' village.

While the inaugural 1951 Games hosted 2,513 participants representing 14 nations, the 2019 Pan American Games involved 6,680 competitors from 41 countries. During the games most athletes and officials are housed in the Pan American Games village. This village is intended to be a self-contained home for all the participants. It is furnished with cafeterias, health clinics, and locations for religious expression.

PASO allows nations to compete that do not meet the strict requirements for political sovereignty that other international organizations demand. As a result, colonies and dependencies are permitted to set up their own National Olympic Committees. This includes territories such as Puerto Rico and Bermuda, which compete as separate nations despite being under the jurisdiction of another power.

=== Winter Pan American Games ===
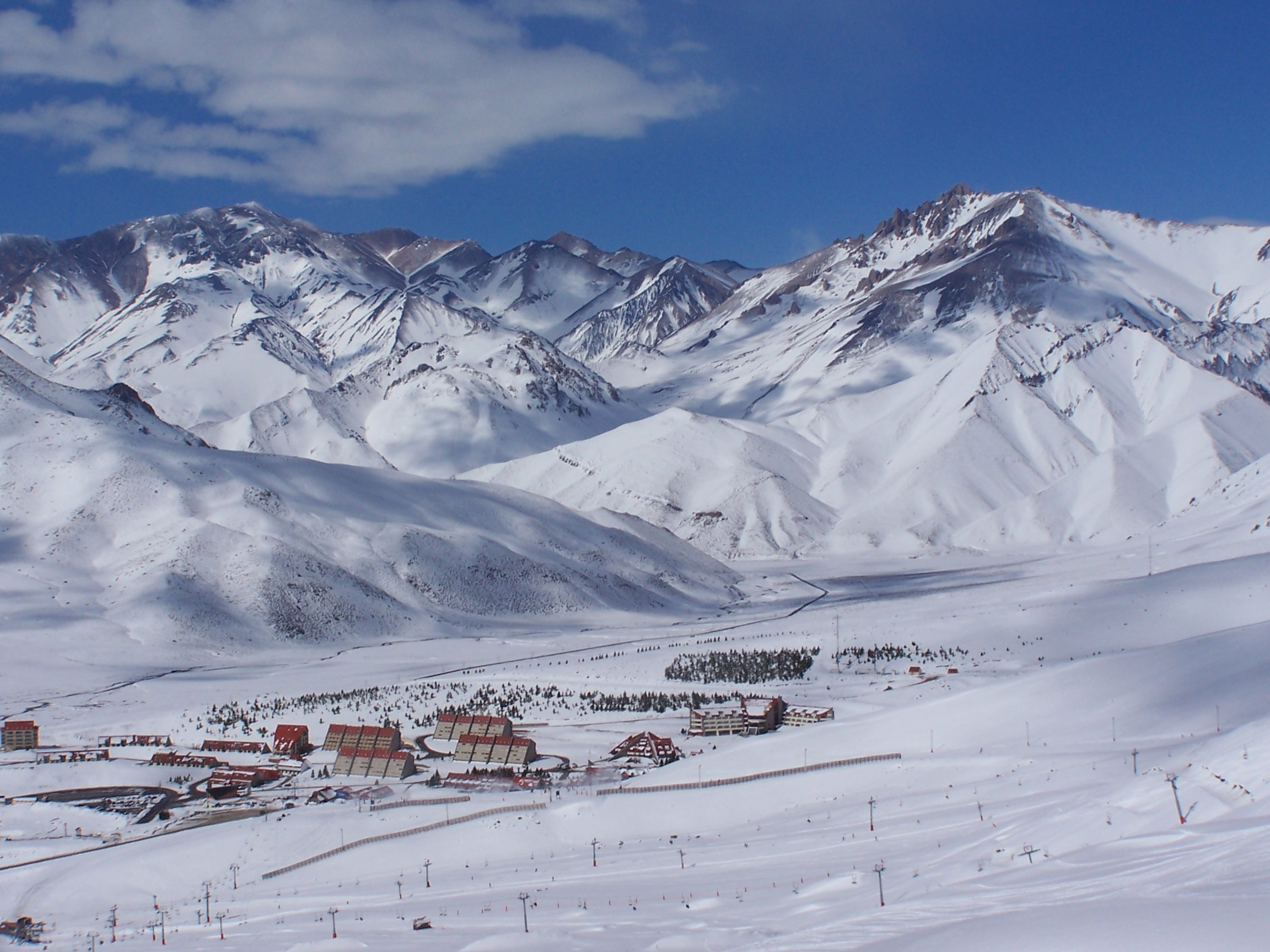
Las Leñas, Argentina, hosted the only Pan American Winter Games.

There have been attempts to hold Winter Pan American Games throughout the history of the games, but these have had little success. The organizers of the 1951 Pan American Games in Buenos Aires planned to stage winter events later in the year, but dropped the idea due to lack of interest. Another difficulty is that the Americas cover both hemispheres, which creates scheduling issues related to reverse seasons.

Lake Placid, New York tried to organize Winter Games in 1959, but again not enough countries expressed interest. The plans were eventually cancelled.

In 1988, members of PASO voted to hold the first Pan American Winter Games at Las Leñas, Argentina in September 1989. It was further agreed that Winter Games would be held every four years. But lack of snow forced the postponement of the games until 16–22 September 1990, when only eight countries sent 97 athletes to Las Leñas. Of that total, 76 were from just three countries: Argentina, Canada, and the United States. Weather was unseasonably warm and again there was little snow, so only three Alpine Skiing events were staged: the Slalom, Giant Slalom, and Super G. The United States and Canada won all 18 medals between them.

PASO awarded the second Pan American Winter Games to Santiago, Chile for 1993. The United States warned that it would not take part unless a full schedule of events was held. The Santiago organizing committee eventually gave up on planning the Games after the United States Olympic Committee declined to participate, and the idea has not been revived since.

=== Junior Pan American Games ===
On 16 January 2019 PASO announced the creation of the Junior Pan American Games. This event, inspired by the Youth Olympic Games, is exclusively for athletes who are under 21 years of age, with fewer requirements on infrastructure and cost.

For the first edition of the games, Panam Sports accepted candidate cities until 31 January. Cali, Colombia; Santa Ana, El Salvador; and Monterrey, Mexico were accepted as candidate cities. Cali was chosen as the host city at the Executive Committee in San José, Costa Rica on 27 March 2019.

Panam Sports chose Asunción, Paraguay as the host for the 2025 Junior Pan American Games. Asunción received 32 out of 48 votes, while Santa Marta, Colombia received the remaining 16 votes.

== Pan American Sports Organization ==
The Pan American Games Movement encompasses a number of national and international sporting organizations and federations, recognized media partners, athletes, officials, judges, and every other person and institution that agrees to abide by the rules of the Olympic Charter (which is the same as PASO's charter). As the umbrella organization of the Olympic Movement, PASO is responsible for selecting the host city, overseeing the planning of the Pan American Games, updating and approving the sports program, and negotiating sponsorship and broadcasting rights.

The Pan American Games Movement is made of three major elements:

- International Federations (IFs) are the governing bodies that supervise a sport at an international level. For example, the International Federation of Association Football (FIFA) is the IF for football (soccer), and the Fédération Internationale de Volleyball (FIVB) is the international governing body for volleyball. There are currently 36 IFs in the Pan American Games Movement, representing each of the Pan American Games sports.
- National Olympic Committees (NOCs) represent and regulate the Pan American Games movement within each country. For example, the United States Olympic Committee (USOC) is the NOC of the United States. There are currently 41 NOCs recognized by PASO.
- Organizing Committees for the Pan America Games (PAOGs) constitute the temporary committees responsible for the organization of a specific celebration of the Pan American Games. PAOGs are dissolved after each Games, once the final report is delivered to PASO.

Spanish and English are the official languages of the Pan American Games Movement. The other language used at each Pan American Games is the language of the host country. For example: at the 2007 Pan American Games which was held in Brazil, the first language was Brazilian Portuguese. Every proclamation (such as the announcement of each country during the parade of nations in the opening ceremony) is spoken in these three languages or the main two depending on whether the host country is an English or Spanish speaking country.

== Symbols ==
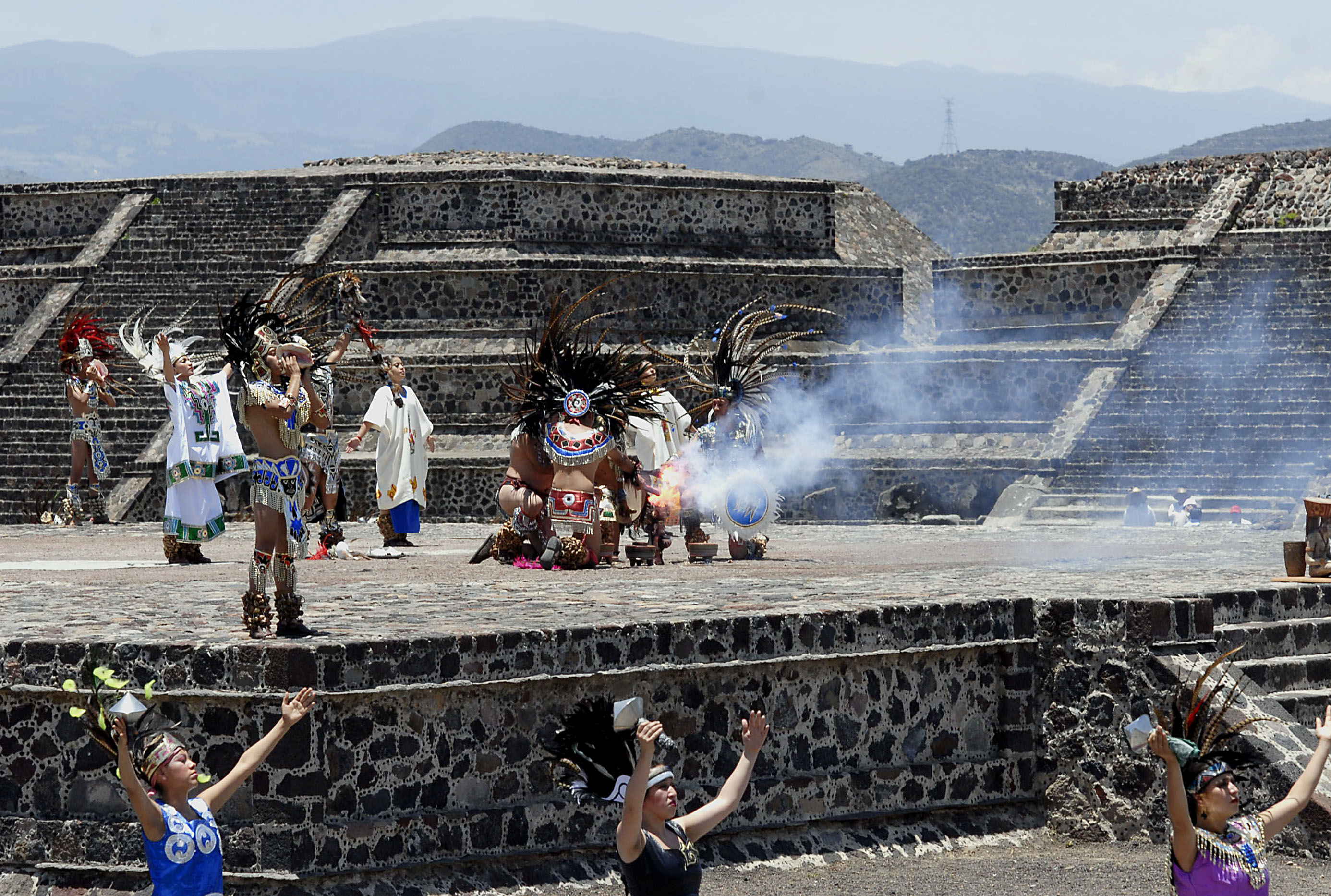
The Pan American Games torch being lit in Teotihuacan.

The Anthem of PASO
Adopted in 2008

The Pan American Games Movement uses symbols to represent the ideals embodied in the Pan American Games charter. The Pan American Sports Organization flag displays the PASO logo on a white background. To highlight the close association between the International Olympic Committee and the Pan Am Games, the Olympic Rings were added to the flag in 1988. The flag has been hoisted during each celebration of the Games. Due to an administrative issue, the flag was hoisted while the Olympic Hymn was played until the 2007 Games. In 2011 Games, the new anthem was played for the first time. The anthem itself was chosen in 2007 and was adopted in 2008.

Similar to the Olympic flame, the Pan American Games flame is lit well before the Games are to commence. The flame was lit for the first games in Olympia, Greece. For subsequent games, the torch has been lit during the simulation of the Aztec new fire ceremony held during the Mezoamerican period, the ceremonies here held first in the Cerro de la Estrella National Park in Mexico City and later they moved the ceremony to the Pyramid of the Sun located in Teotihuacan Pyramids Complex. The only exception was for the São Paulo games in 1963, when the torch was lit in Brasília by the indigenous Guaraní people and two ways were held as the country also hosted the 1963 Summer Universiade in Porto Alegre. An Aztec elder then lights the torch of the first relay bearer, thus initiating the Pan American torch relay that will carry the flame to the host city's main stadium, where it plays an important role in the opening ceremony. Since 2011, the flame is required to be held during the games in the stadium which will host the athletics competition. If the Opening ceremony and athletics competition will be held in different stadiums, the flame will be required to move from one stadium to the other. Exceptions occurred in the 1987, 1999, 2007 and 2015 Games when they have only one cauldron. In some cases the flame burn in a cauldron placed outside the main stadium.

The Pan American Games mascot, an animal or human figure representing the cultural heritage of the host country, was introduced in 1979 in San Juan, Puerto Rico. It has played an important part on the Games identity and promotion. The mascot of the most recent Pan American Games, in Santiago de Chile, was Fiu, a seven color rush tyrant.

List of Games mascots:

- San Juan 1979: Coqui (frog)
- Caracas 1983: Santiaguito (lion)
- Indianapolis 1987: Amigo (green parrot)
- Havana 1991: Tocopan (bird)
- Mar del Plata 1995: Lobi (sea lion)
- Winnipeg 1999: Duck and Lorita (ducks)
- Santo Domingo 2003: Tito (manatee)
- Rio de Janeiro 2007: Cauê (sun)
- Guadalajara 2011: Huichi (deer), Gavo (agave plant) and Leo (lion)
- Toronto 2015: Pachi (porcupine)
- Lima 2019: Milco (statue)
- Santiago 2023: Fiu (Many-colored rush tyrant)

== Ceremonies ==
=== Opening ===
As mandated by the Olympic Charter, various elements frame the opening ceremony of the Pan American Games. The Organizing Committee of each edition has the flexibility to choose the order of the opening ceremony program. But, it has been common since 2007 that the opening ceremonies starts with the nation anthem of the host country and the nations parade is held immediately afterwards, with the athletes grouped by nation. Argentina is traditionally the first nation to enter in order to honor the origins of the Pan American Games, similarly to how Greece enters first in the Olympic Games as the originator. Nations usually then enter the stadium alphabetically according to the host country's or city's official language, with the host country's athletes being the last to enter. During the 1995 Pan American Games, which was hosted in Mar del Plata, Argentina, the Argentine flag entered the stadium first, while the country's delegation entered last (similarly to the 2004 Summer Olympics in Greece) and all delegations could sit in reserved areas in the stands of the main stadium. The speeches are given, formally opening the Games; the PANAM Sports Flag and Olympic Flag are raised and the oaths taken immediately afterwards. The host nation then presents artistic displays of music, singing, dance, and theater representative of its culture and history. The artistic presentations have grown in scale and complexity as successive hosts attempt to provide a ceremony that outlasts its predecessor's in terms of memorability. The opening ceremony of the 2011 Games held in Guadalajara, Mexico, reportedly cost $20 million, with much of the cost incurred in the artistic segment. Finally, the Pan American torch is brought into the stadium and passed on until it reaches the final torch carrier—often a well-known and successful athlete from the host nation—who lights the Pan American Games flame in the stadium's cauldron.

=== Closing ===
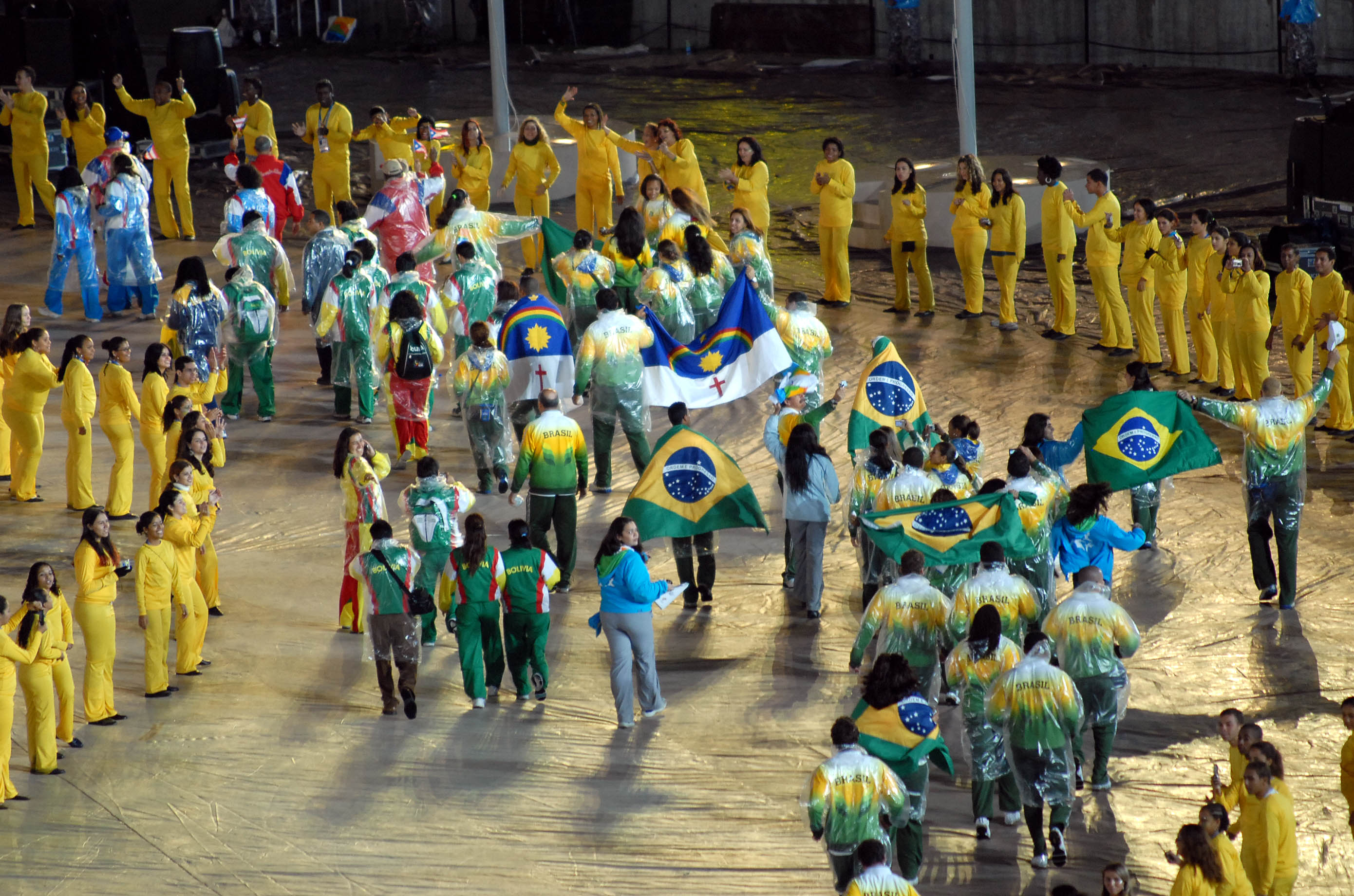
Athletes gather in the stadium during the closing ceremony of the 2007 Pan American Games.

The closing ceremony of the Pan American Games takes place after all sporting events have concluded. Flag-bearers from each participating country enter the stadium, followed by the athletes who enter together, without any national distinction.

Two flags are hoisted while the corresponding national anthems are played: the flags of the current host country and of the country hosting the next Pan American Games. The president of the organizing committee and the president of PASO make their closing speeches, the Games are officially closed, and the Pan American family is invited to participate at the next Games. The PanAm Sports Flag and the Olympic Flag are lowered and Pan-American flame is then extinguished. In what is known as the Antwerp Ceremony, the highest authority of the city that organized the Games transfers a special Pan American Games flag to the president of PASO, who then passes it on to the current highest authority of the city hosting the next Games. After these compulsory elements, the next host nation briefly introduces itself with artistic displays of dance and theater representative of its culture. The closing ceremony may include a fifteen-minute presentation from the next host city.

=== Medal presentation ===
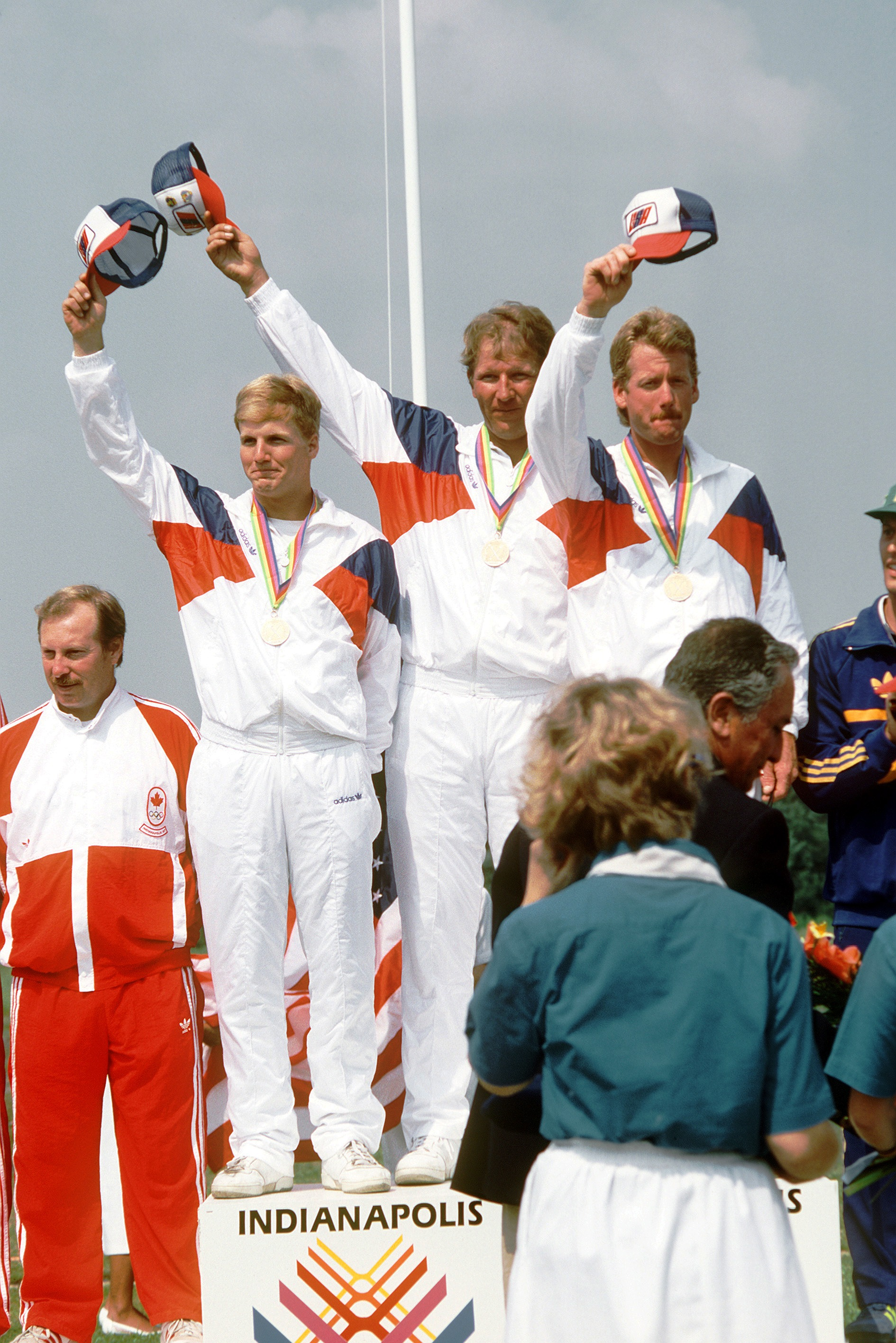
A medal ceremony during the 1987 Pan American Games in Indianapolis.

At the conclusion of each event, medals are ceremonially presented by an IOC or PASO member to the first, second and third-place finishers. The medal winners stand on a three-tiered podium while receiving their medals. After the medals are presented, the national flags of the three medalists are raised while the national anthem of the gold medalist's country plays. Volunteering citizens of the host country act as hosts during the medal ceremonies: they aid the officials who present the medals and act as flag-bearers. For each event, the respective medal ceremony is held, at most, one day after the event's final. When athletics was scheduled for the last days, the men's marathon is run on the last day of the games, and the award ceremony is held before or during the closing ceremony.

== Sports ==
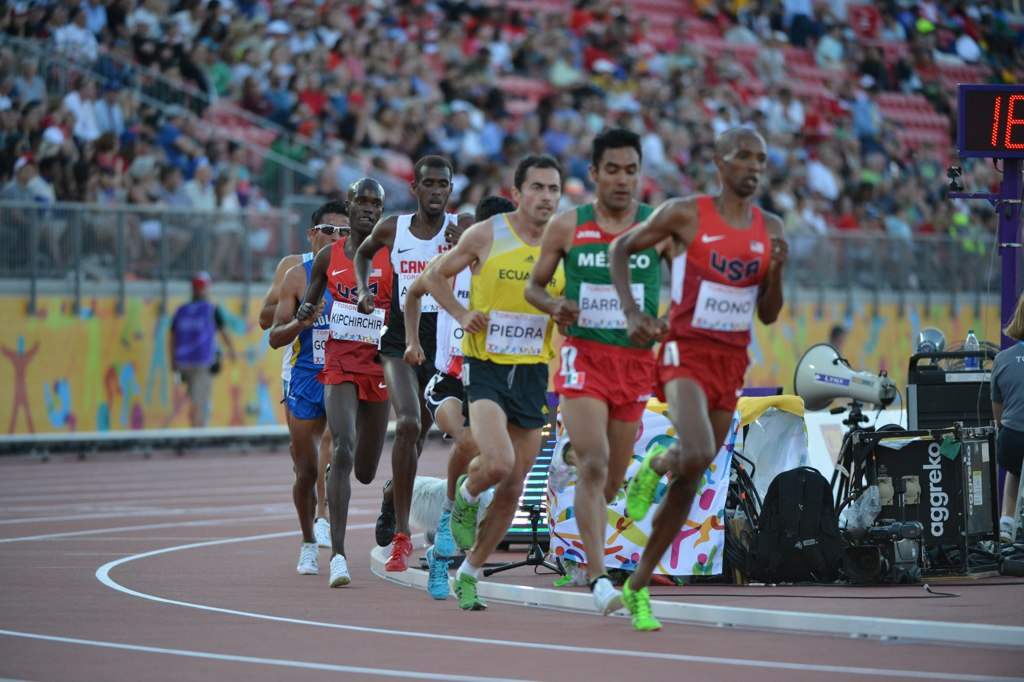
Athletics has been held at all nineteen editions of the Pan American Games. Pictured here is the 10,000 metres event for men at the 2015 edition in Toronto.

Key: = Discontinued

Sport	Years
3x3 basketball	Since 2019
Archery	Since 1971
Artistic swimming	1955, 1971, 1979–
Athletics	Since 1951
Badminton	Since 1995
Baseball	Since 1951
Basketball	1951–2023
Basque pelota	1995, 2003, 2011, 2019–
Beach volleyball	Since 1999
Bodybuilding	2019
Bowling	Since 1995–2023
Boxing	Since 1951
Breaking	2023
Canoeing	Since 1987
Cricket	2027
Cycling	Since 1951
Diving	Since 1951
Equestrian	1951–1955, 1963–1971, 1979–
Fencing	1951–1955, 1963–1971, 1979–
Field hockey	Since 1967
Football	Since 1951
Futsal	2007
Gymnastics	Since 1951
Golf	Since 2015
Handball	Since 1987
Judo	1963–1967, 1975–

Sport	Years
Karate	Since 1995
Marathon swimming	Since 2015
Modern pentathlon	1951–1963, 1987–
Polo	1951
Racquetball	1991–2003, 2011–2023
Roller sports	1979, 1987–
Rowing	Since 1951
Rugby sevens	Since 2011
Sailing	1951–1971, 1979–
Sambo	1983
Shooting	Since 1951
Softball	Since 1979
Sport climbing	Since 2023
Squash	Since 1995
Surfing	Since 2019
Swimming	Since 1951
Table tennis	Since 1979
Taekwondo	Since 1987
Tennis	1951–1967, 1979–
Triathlon	Since 1995
Volleyball	Since 1955
Water polo	Since 1951
Water skiing	Since 1995
Weightlifting	Since 1951
Wrestling	Since 1951

== Medals ==
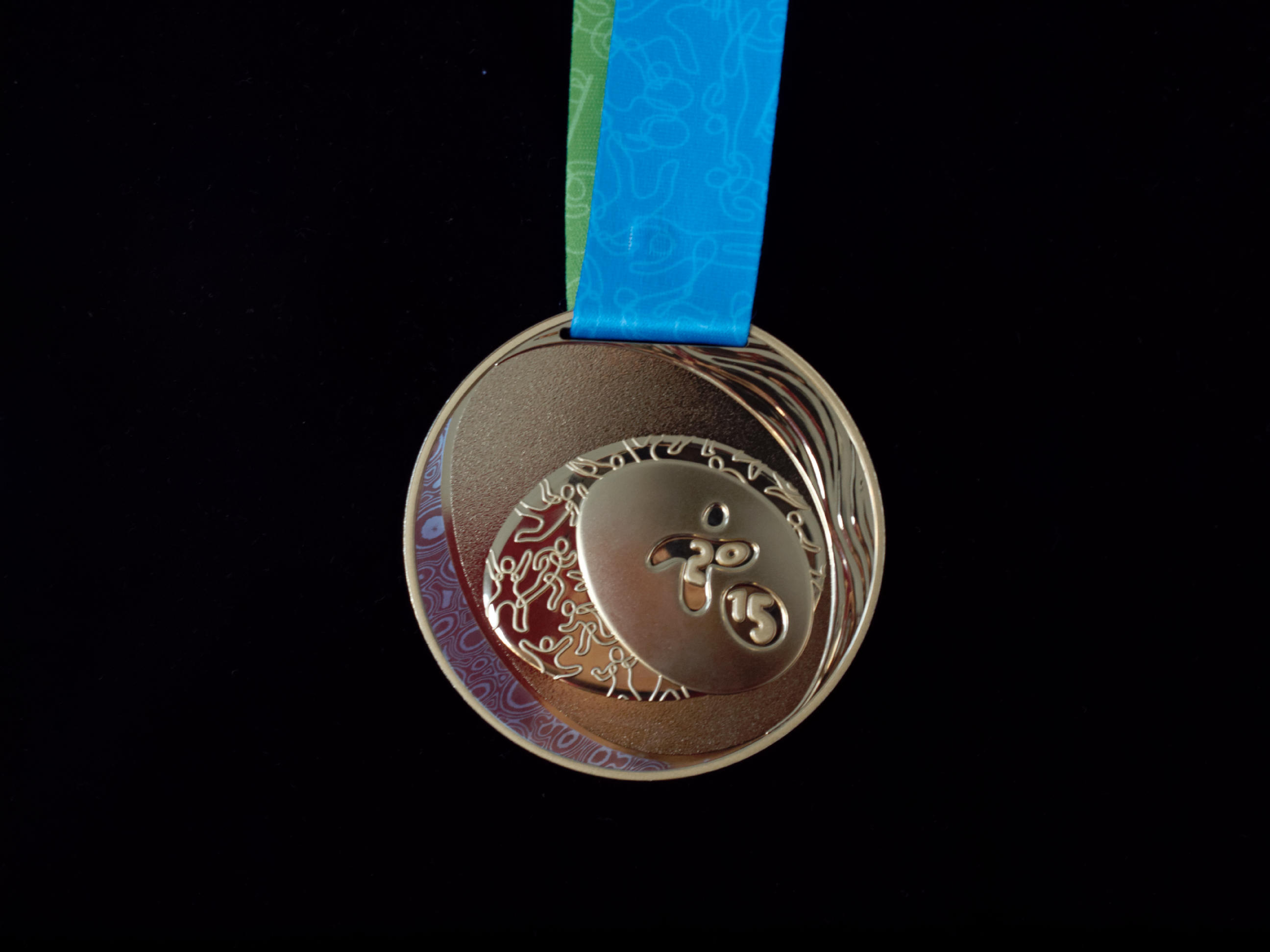
Gold medal from the 2015 Pan American Games

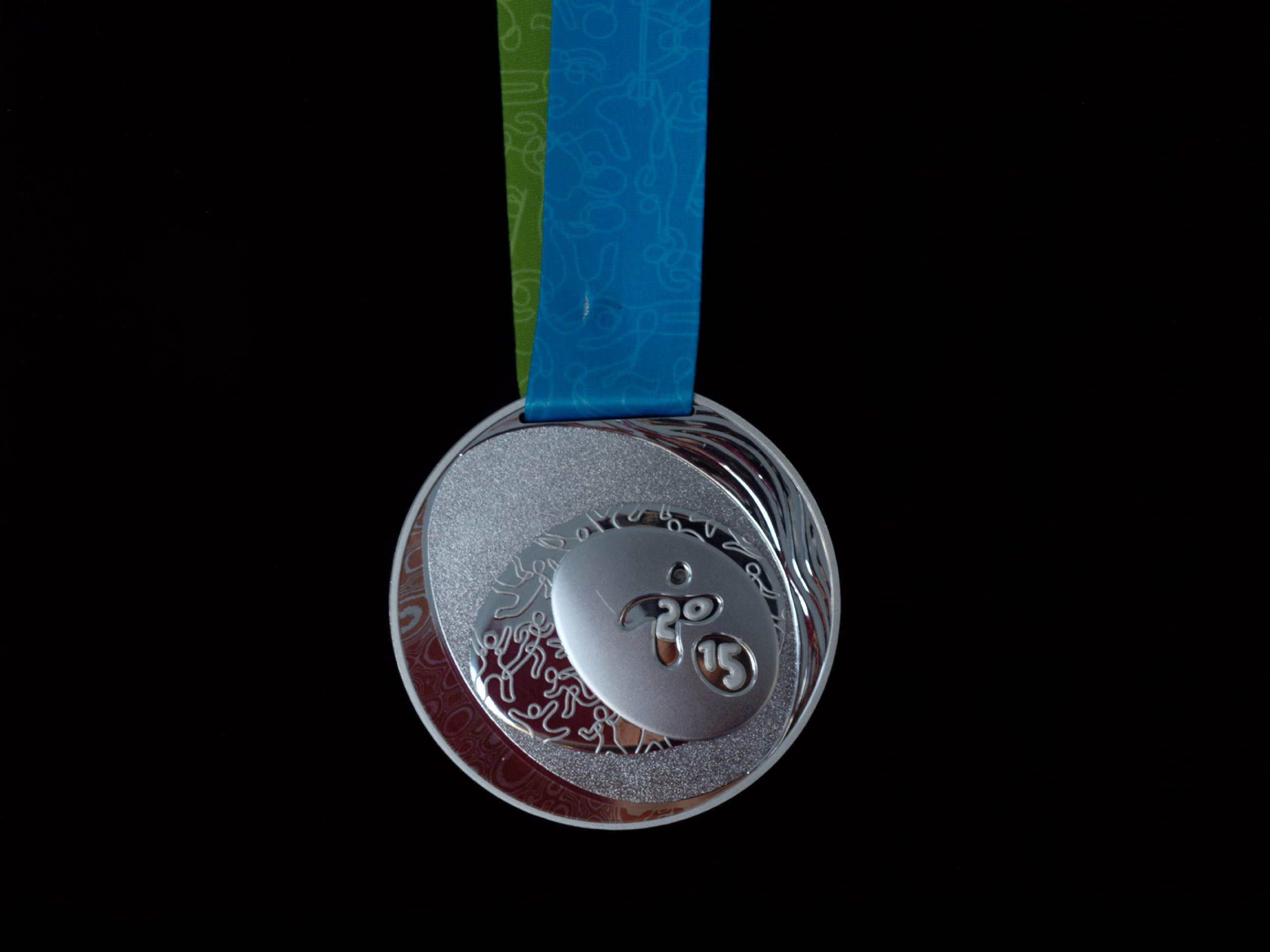
Silver medal from the 2015 Pan American Games

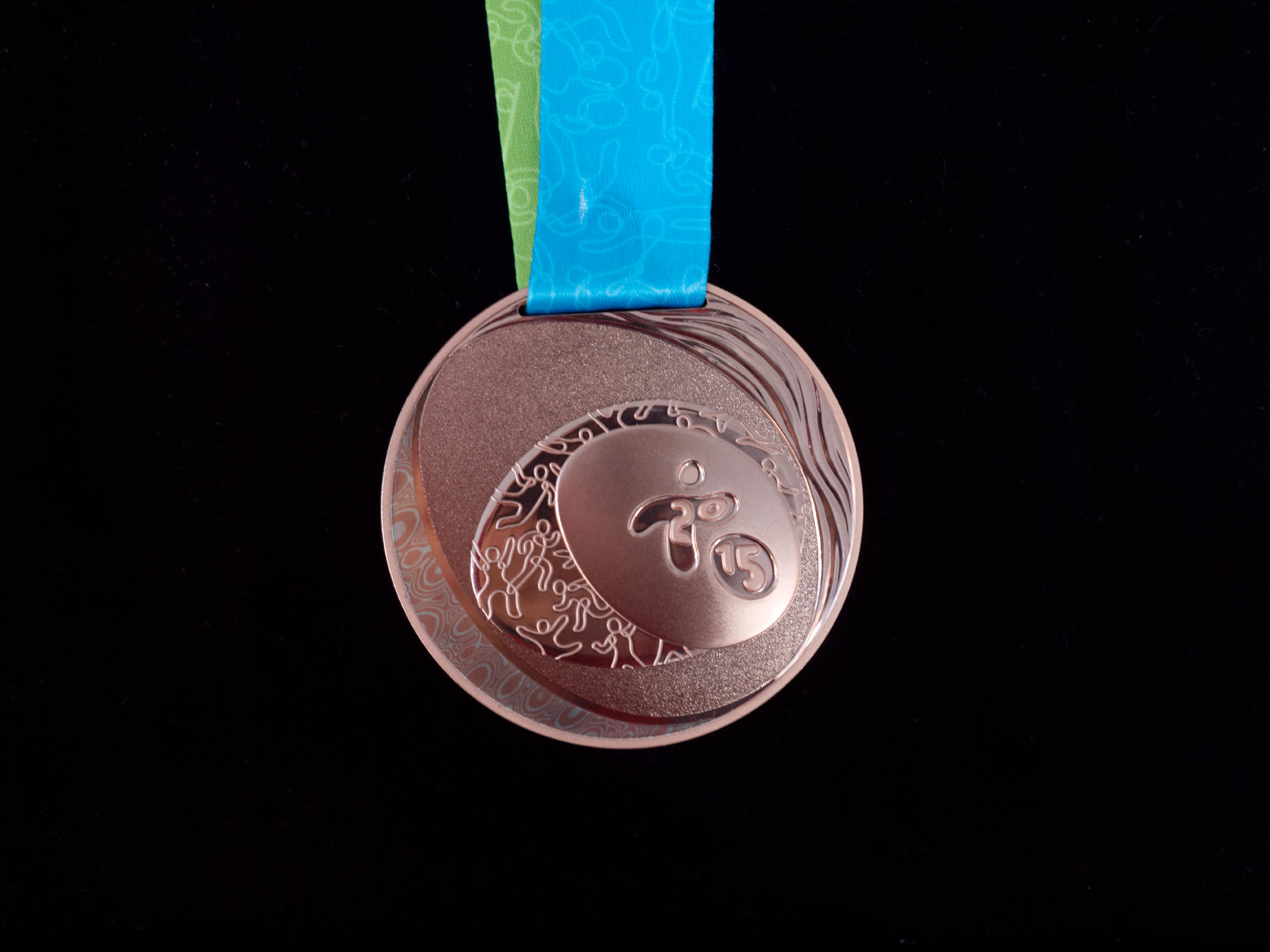
Bronze medal from the 2015 Pan American Games

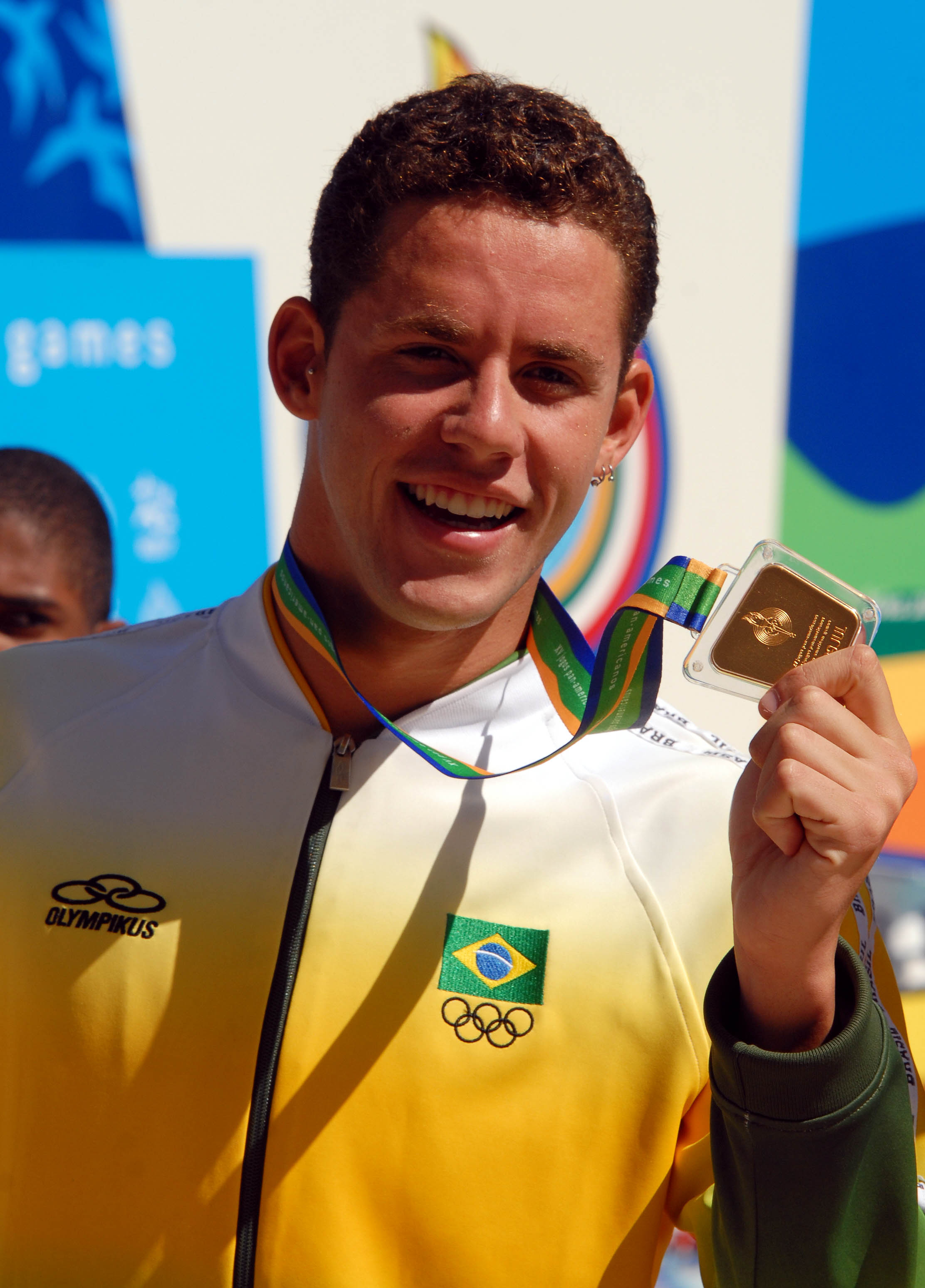
Swimmer Thiago Pereira of Brazil has a record 23 Pan American medals. Here he holds a gold medal during the 2007 edition.

The athletes or teams who place first, second, or third in each event receive medals. The winners receive gold medals, while the runners-up receive silver medals and the third-place athletes are awarded bronze medals. In events contested by a single-elimination tournament (most notably boxing), third place might not be determined and both semifinal losers receive bronze medals. PASO does not keep statistics of medals won, but National Olympic Committees and the media record medal statistics as a measure of success.

The top ten nations all time at the Pan American Games (minus medals won at the Winter Pan American Games):

Summer Pan American Games
Rank	Nation	Gold	Silver	Bronze	Total
1	United States	2,188	1,617	1,194	4,999
2	Cuba	938	642	613	2,193
3	Canada	537	776	918	2,231
4	Brazil	449	476	656	1,581
5	Argentina	343	391	501	1,235
6	Mexico	310	362	617	1,289
7	Colombia	164	210	292	666
8	Venezuela	110	235	317	662
9	Chile	69	141	205	415
10	Dominican Republic	48	82	146	276
Totals (10 entries)		5,156	4,932	5,459	15,547

Winter Pan American Games
Rank	Nation	Gold	Silver	Bronze	Total
1	United States	4	2	5	11
2	Canada	2	4	1	7
Totals (2 entries)		6	6	6	18

== List of Pan American Games ==
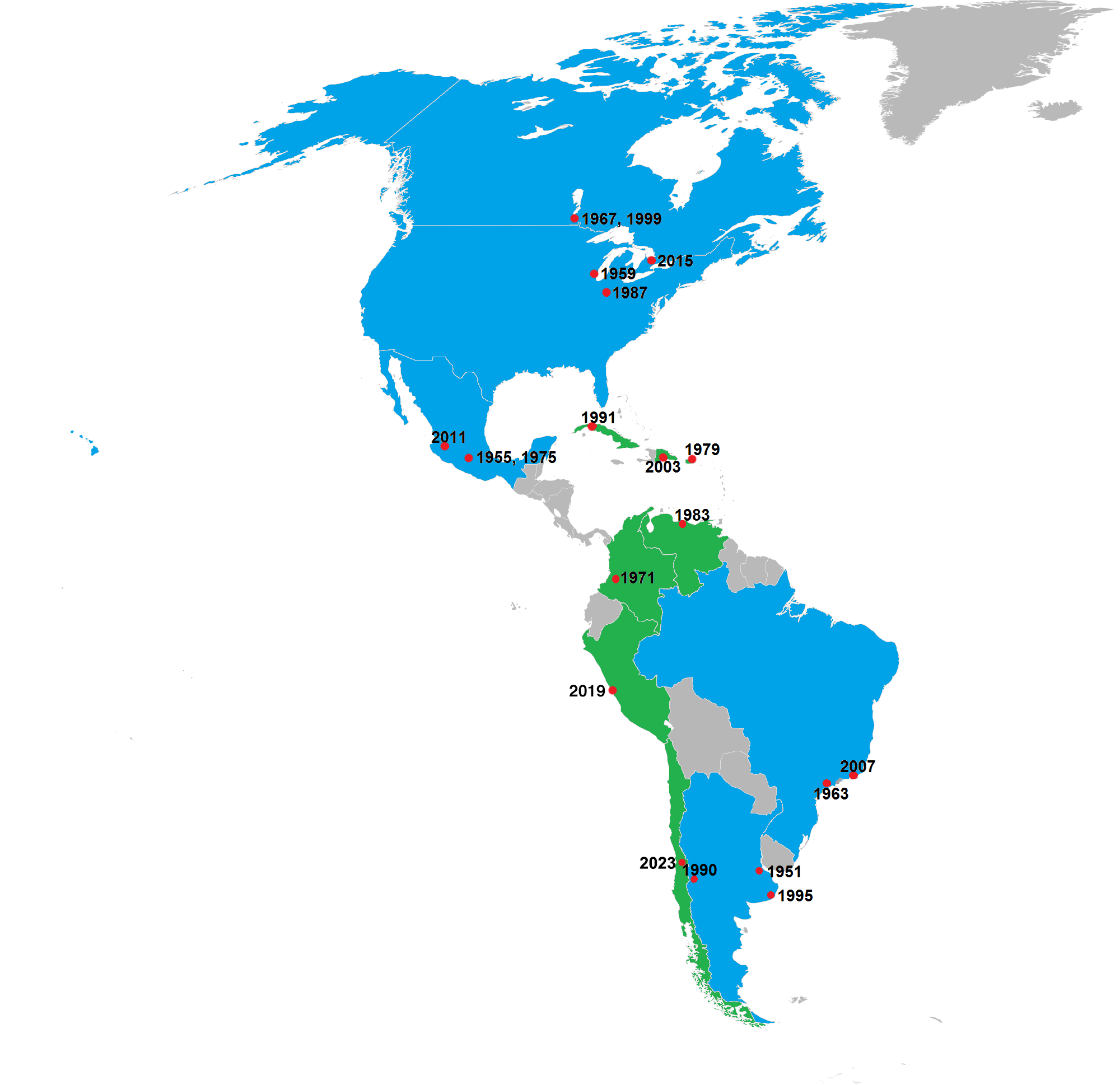
Map of Pan American Games locations (host cities in red dots). Countries that have hosted one Pan Am Games are shaded green, while countries that have hosted two or more are shaded blue.

The Pan American Games have been hosted by 17 cities in 11 countries. Mexico and Canada have hosted three Pan American Games each, more than any other nation. Among cities, only Winnipeg and Mexico City have hosted the Games twice. The city of Lima, Peru, which hosted the Games in 2019, will be the host city again in 2027, making this the third city to have hosted the Games twice.

The host city for a Pan American Games is usually decided between six and seven years ahead of the Games. The selection process is held in two phases that span a three year period. Since 2024, cities or regions can apply for the Games, following the changes proposed by the International Olympic Committee, respecting Agenda 2020+5. The interested parties can present their proposals to their country's National Olympic Committee (NOC), who can accept or reject the proposals. If more than one city or region from the same country submits a proposal to its NOC, the national committee typically holds an internal selection, since only one bid per NOC can be presented to the PanAm Sports for consideration. Once the deadline for submission of proposals by the NOCs is reached, the first phase (Application) begins with the applicant cities asked to complete a questionnaire form regarding several key criteria related to the organization of the Pan American Games. In that form, the applicants must give assurances that they will comply with the Olympic Charter and with any other regulations established by PanAm Sports's Executive Committee. A group of experts from PanAm Sports evaluates each application, with an overview of each applicant's project and their potential to host the Games. On the basis of this technical evaluation, PASO's Executive Board selects the applicants that will proceed to the candidature stage.

Once the candidate cities are selected, they must submit to PASO a bigger and more detailed presentation of their project as part of a candidature file. Each city is thoroughly analyzed by an evaluation commission. This commission will visit the candidates, interviewing local officials and inspecting prospective venue sites, and submit a report on its findings one month before the PanAm Sports's final decision. During the interview process the bidding city or region must guarantee that it will be able to fund the Games. After the work of the evaluation commission, a list of candidates is presented to the General Session of PanAm Sports, which is assembled in a country that must not have a candidate city in the running. The members of PASO gathered in the Session have the final vote on the host city. Once elected, the host city bid committee (together with the NOC of the respective country) signs a Host City Contract with PanAm Sports, officially becoming a Pan American Games host nation and host city.

Edition	Year	Host city	Host nation	Opened by (Note: Names & offices in italics reflect an opener who was not head of state when opening the Games. If the office is partially italicized, the non-italicized portion is the office & name of the head of state being represented.)	Start date	End date	Nations	Competitors	Sports	Events	Top placed team
1	1951	Buenos Aires	Argentina	President Juan Domingo Perón	February 25	March 9	21	2,513	18	140	Argentina
2	1955	Mexico City	Mexico	President Adolfo Ruiz Cortines	March 12	March 26	22	2,583	17	146	United States
3	1959	Chicago	United States	Milton S. Eisenhower (Note: Representing his brother Dwight D. Eisenhower, President of the United States)	August 27	September 7	25	2,263	15	166	United States
4	1963	São Paulo	Brazil	Governor Adhemar de Barros	April 20	May 5	22	1,665	19	160	United States
5	1967	Winnipeg	Canada	Prince Philip (Note: Representing Elizabeth II, Queen of Canada.)	July 23	August 6	29	2,361	19	169	United States
6	1971	Cali	Colombia	President Misael Pastrana Borrero	July 30	August 13	32	2,935	17	164	United States
7	1975	Mexico City	Mexico	President Luis Echeverría	October 12	October 26	33	3,146	19	190	United States
8	1979	San Juan	Puerto Rico	Governor Carlos Romero Barceló	July 1	July 15	34	3,700	21	249	United States
9	1983	Caracas	Venezuela	President Luis Herrera Campins	August 14	August 29	36	3,426	22	249	United States
10	1987	Indianapolis	United States	Vice President George H. W. Bush (Note: Representing Ronald Reagan, President of the United States)	August 7	August 23	38	4,360	27	296	United States
11	1991	Havana	Cuba	President Fidel Castro	August 2	August 18	39	4,519	28	331	Cuba
12	1995	Mar del Plata	Argentina	President Carlos Menem	March 12	March 26	42	5,144	34	408	United States
13	1999	Winnipeg	Canada	Governor General Roméo LeBlanc	July 23	August 8	42	5,083	34	330	United States
14	2003	Santo Domingo	Dominican Republic	President Hipólito Mejía	August 1	August 17	42	5,223	34	338	United States
15	2007	Rio de Janeiro	Brazil	Carlos Arthur Nuzman	July 13	July 29	42	5,633	33	331	United States
16	2011	Guadalajara	Mexico	President Felipe Calderón	October 14	October 30	42	5,996	36	361	United States
17	2015	Toronto	Canada	Governor General David Johnston	July 10	July 26	41	6,123	36	364	United States
18	2019	Lima	Peru	President Martín Vizcarra	July 26	August 11	41	6,668	38	419	United States
19	2023	Santiago	Chile	President Gabriel Boric	October 20	November 5	41	6,909	39	425	United States
20	2027	Lima	Peru	TBD	July 23	August 8	41	TBD	38	TBD	TBD
21	2031	Asunción	Paraguay	TBD	August 8	August 24	41	TBD	TBD	TBD	TBD

== Participating nations ==
As of the 2023 edition, 35 countries and six territories, whose National Olympic Committee is recognized by the Pan American Sports Organization, compete at the Pan American Games.

- Antigua and Barbuda
- Argentina
- Aruba
- Bahamas
- Barbados
- Belize
- Bermuda
- Bolivia
- Brazil
- British Virgin Islands
- Canada
- Cayman Islands
- Chile
- Colombia
- Costa Rica
- Cuba
- Dominica
- Dominican Republic
- Ecuador
- El Salvador
- Grenada
- Guatemala
- Guyana
- Haiti
- Honduras
- Jamaica
- Mexico
- Nicaragua
- Panama
- Paraguay
- Peru
- Puerto Rico
- Saint Kitts and Nevis
- Saint Lucia
- Saint Vincent and the Grenadines
- Suriname
- Trinidad and Tobago
- United States
- Uruguay
- Venezuela
- Virgin Islands

== See also ==
- Bids for the Pan American Games
- Junior Pan American Games
- Pan American Winter Games
- Parapan American Games
- Parapan Youth American Games
- Central American and Caribbean Games
- South American Games
- Pan American Sports Festival
- African Games
- Asian Games
- European Games
- Pacific Games
- Olympic Games
- Commonwealth Games
