= Mario Vázquez Raña =

Mexican businessman (1932–2015)

Mario Vásquez Raña

Executive Board NOC Representative of the International Olympic Committee
- In office 2000 – March 2012
- Succeeded by: Pat Hickey

Member of the International Olympic Committee
- In office 1991 – March 2012
- Preceded by: Eduardo Hay

President of the Association of National Olympic Committees
- In office 1979 – March 2012
- Succeeded by: Ahmad Al-Fahad Al-Ahmed Al-Sabah

President of the Pan American Sports Organization
- In office 1975–2015
- Preceded by: José Beracasa
- Succeeded by: Ivar Sisniega (acting)

President of the Mexican Olympic Committee
- In office 1974–2001
- Preceded by: Pedro Ramírez Vázquez
- Succeeded by: Felipe Muñoz

Personal details
- Born: June 7, 1932 Mexico City, Mexico
- Died: February 8, 2015 (aged 82) Mexico City, Mexico
- Spouse: Francisca Ramos
- Children: 5
- Relatives: Olegario Vázquez Raña; Abel Vázquez
- Education: National Autonomous University of Mexico (BBA)

Mario Vázquez Raña (June 7, 1932 - February 8, 2015) was a Mexican businessman and sports administrator, who served on both national and Olympic committees. He served as a member of the executive board of the International Olympic Committee (IOC) and the Association of National Olympic Committees (ANOC) until 2012. He was the President of the Pan American Sports Organization (PASO).

On April 5, 2008, Vázquez Raña received international press attention for his statement that the situation in Tibet "is a Chinese problem" that is "not an issue for the Olympic Games."

== Career ==
- President of the board of directors of the Hermanos Vázquez Company (1960–1980);
- President and director general of the Organización Editorial Mexicana (1975–) the largest newspaper company in Latin America, "Cartones Ponderosa" (2001–) and
- owned United Press International (1985–1988)

On 15 March 2012 he resigned from the IOC, IOC Executive Board and as the head of the Association of National Olympic Committees. He also resigned from being the President of the Olympic Solidarity Commission. He continued to serve as the head of the Pan American Sports Organization.

== 2012 Controversy ==
In 2012, Vázquez Raña came under media scrutiny for allegedly manipulating news stories in newspapers controlled by the Organización Editorial Mexicana in favor of Enrique Peña Nieto, presidential candidate of the Institutional Revolutionary Party.

On May 11, 2012, Enrique Peña Nieto gave a speech at the Universidad Iberoamericana in Mexico City as part of his 2012 presidential campaign. He was jeered by the general student population upon arrival, but was allowed to deliver his remarks. Multiple newspapers belonging to the Organización Editorial Mexicana including El Sol de México and Diario de Xalapa covered the story by printing identical headlines labeling Peña Nieto's speech a "success" after an attempted "boycott" by leftist activists. The university incident, as well as the coverage by newspapers controlled by Vázquez Raña subsequently received media attention and scrutiny.

== Sports ==
Vásquez Raña participated in shooting competitions at national and international level in 1960. grupo star (2010)

== Sports Administration ==
- President of the Mexican Shooting Federation (1969–1974);
- President of the American Shooting Confederation (1973–1979);
- Vice-President of the Mexican Sports Confederation (1973–1976);
- member of the Mexican Olympic Committee (Comité Olímpico Mexicano) (1972–1974) then
  - President (1974–2001);
- President of the PanAmerican Games Organization Committee (1975);
- President, Pan American Sports Organization (1975–2015);
- President of the Association of National Olympic Committees (ANOC) (1979–2012)

== Positions with the IOC ==
- Member of the Executive Board as representative of NOCs (2000–2012);
- Vice-Chairman of the Olympic Solidarity Commission (1979–1996),
  - Deputy Chairman (1997–2001) then
  - Chairman (2002–2012);
- member of the following Commissions:
  - Olympic Movement (1990–1999),
  - Preparation of the XII Olympic Congress (1990–1994),
  - Apartheid and Olympism (1990–1992),
  - "IOC 2000" (Executive Committee, 1999),
  - Marketing (2000),
  - IOC 2000 Reform Follow-up (2002).

== Awards ==
In 1986 Vázquez received the Eagle Award from the United States Sports Academy. The Eagle Award is the Academy's highest international honor and was awarded to Vázquez for his significant contributions in promoting international harmony, peace, and goodwill through the effective use of sport.

== See also ==
- Organización Editorial Mexicana
