= Panam Sports =

International sports organization

- Pan American Sports Organization; Organización Deportiva Panamericana

- Member countries are in green
- Formation: August 8, 1948; 77 years ago
- Type: Continental Sports Organization
- Headquarters: Mexico City, Mexico
- Locations: Santiago, Chile; Miami, Florida, U.S.
- Coordinates: 19°26′14″N 99°09′30″W
- Members: 41 National Olympic Committees
- Official language: English, Spanish
- President: (Chile) Neven Ilic
- Website: www.panamsports.org

Panam Sports, officially the Pan American Sports Organization (Spanish: Organización Deportiva Panamericana), is an international organization which represents the current 41 National Olympic Committees of the Americas.

It is affiliated with the International Olympic Committee and its affiliated bodies, including the Association of National Olympic Committees, and serves as the continental association of the Americas.

The organization's flagship event is the quadrennial Pan American Games, held since 1951. The Parapan American Games were inaugurated in 1999 for disabled athletes and are held alongside the able-bodied Pan American Games. The Pan American Winter Games, for winter sports, were held only once in 1990. The Pan American Sports Festival was inaugurated in 2014 as a developmental event for the region's athletes.

== Affiliated organizations ==
There are four regional entities affiliated with Panam Sports, they are:

- CACSO (ODECABE) – organizers of the Central American and Caribbean Games
- ODEBO – organizers of the Bolivarian Games
- ODESUR – organizers of the South American Games
- ORDECA – organizers of the Central American Games

== Official languages ==
The organization's official languages are English and Spanish.

== Flag ==
Just like the International Olympic Committee, Panam Sports has its own flag. In 2017, Panam Sports underwent a complete rebranding of the organization, including changes to its commercial name (now Panam Sports), brand and flag. The modern design emphasizes the unity of Panam Sports' 41 member nations, displaying the both continents within a seal that features the new commercial name 'Panam Sports' at the top and 'Organization' at the bottom. The Olympic Rings reside below the seal, symbolizing the continental organization's close relationship with the IOC and the Olympic Games. The seal and accompanying rings are centered on the white background of the flag.

The original flag of PASO-ODEPA contained organization's motto "AMÉRICA, ESPÍRITO, SPORT, FRATERNITÉ", each respectively in Spanish, Portuguese, English and French. The original flag also displayed a torch along with the Olympic Rings and five circles with the official colors of the Olympics on a white background. Finally, the words PASO and ODEPA were written to indicate the organization the flag represents.

== Member nations ==
In the following table, the year in which the NOC was recognized by the International Olympic Committee (IOC) is also given if it is different from the year in which the NOC was created.

Nation	Code	National Olympic Committee	President	Created/Recognised	IOC member	Subregion
Antigua and Barbuda	ANT	Antigua and Barbuda National Olympic Committee	E.P. Chet Greene	1966/1976	Yes	Caribbean
Argentina	ARG	Argentine Olympic Committee	Mario Moccia	1923	Yes	South America
Aruba	ARU	Aruban Olympic Committee	Wanda Broeksema	1985/1986	Yes	Caribbean/South America (Note: Represented by athletes from all six Dutch Caribbean territories instead.)
Bahamas	BAH	Bahamas Olympic Committee	Romell Knowles	1952	Yes	Caribbean
Barbados	BAR	Barbados Olympic Association	Sandra Osborne	1955	Yes	Caribbean
Belize	BIZ	Belize Olympic and Commonwealth Games Association	Hilberto Martínez	1967	Yes	Central America/Caribbean
Bermuda	BER	Bermuda Olympic Association	Peter Dunne	1935/1936	Yes	Northern America (Note: Northern America does not have a regional multi-sport event, Bermuda competes in the Central American and Caribbean Games instead.)
Bolivia	BOL	Bolivian Olympic Committee	Marco Antonio Arze Mendoza	1932/1936	Yes	South America/Bolivarian
Brazil	BRA	Brazilian Olympic Committee	Marco Antônio La Porta	1914/1935	Yes	South America
British Virgin Islands	IVB	British Virgin Islands Olympic Committee	Ephraim Penn	1980/1982	Yes	Caribbean
Canada	CAN	Canadian Olympic Committee	Tricia Smith	1904/1907	Yes	Northern America (Note: Northern America does not have a regional multi-sport event, Canada only competes in the Pan American Games.)
Cayman Islands	CAY	Cayman Islands Olympic Committee	Lorette Powell (acting)	1973/1976	Yes	Caribbean
Chile	CHI	Chilean Olympic Committee	Miguel Ángel Mujica	1934	Yes	South America/Bolivarian
Colombia	COL	Colombian Olympic Committee	Ciro Solano Hurtado	1936/1948	Yes	South America/Caribbean/Bolivarian
Costa Rica	CRC	Costa Rican Olympic Committee	Alexánder Zamora Gomez	1953/1954	Yes	Central America/Caribbean
Cuba	CUB	Cuban Olympic Committee	Roberto León Richards Aguiar	1926/1954	Yes	Caribbean
Dominica	DMA	Dominica Olympic Committee	Billy Doctrove	1987/1993	Yes	Caribbean
Dominican Republic	DOM	Dominican Republic Olympic Committee	Antonio Acosta Corletto	1946/1962	Yes	Caribbean/Bolivarian
Ecuador	ECU	Ecuadorian National Olympic Committee	Cap. Jorge Delgado Panchana	1948/1959	Yes	South America/Bolivarian
El Salvador	ESA	El Salvador Olympic Committee	Jose Armando Bruni Ochoa	1949/1962	Yes	Central America/Bolivarian
Grenada	GRN	Grenada Olympic Committee	Cheney Joseph	1984	Yes	Caribbean
Guatemala	GUA	Guatemalan Olympic Committee	Gerardo Aguirre	1947	Yes	Central America/Caribbean/Bolivarian
Guyana	GUY	Guyana Olympic Association	Kalam Azad Juman-Yassin	1935/1948	Yes	South America (Note: Geographically a part of South America, Guyana also competes in the Central American and Caribbean Games.)
Haiti	HAI	Haitian Olympic Committee	Hans Larsen	1914/1924	Yes	Caribbean
Honduras	HON	Honduran Olympic Committee	José Ubaldo Zavala Valladares	1956	Yes	Central America/Caribbean
Jamaica	JAM	Jamaica Olympic Association	Christopher Samuda	1936	Yes	Caribbean
Mexico	MEX	Mexican Olympic Committee	María José Alcalá	1923	Yes	Central America/Caribbean (Note: Mexico does not compete in the Central American Games, the country only competes in the Central American and Caribbean Games.)
Nicaragua	NCA	Nicaraguan Olympic Committee	Emmett Lang Salmerón	1959	Yes	Central America/Caribbean
Panama	PAN	Panama Olympic Committee	Camilo Amado	1934/1947	Yes	Central America/Caribbean/South America/Bolivarian
Paraguay	PAR	Paraguayan Olympic Committee	Camilo Pérez López Moreira	1970	Yes	South America/Bolivarian
Peru	PER	Peruvian Olympic Committee	Renzo Manyari	1924/1936	Yes	South America/Bolivarian
Puerto Rico	PUR	Puerto Rico Olympic Committee	Sara Rosario	1948	Yes	Caribbean
Saint Kitts and Nevis	SKN	Saint Kitts and Nevis Olympic Committee	Alphonso Bridgewater	1986/1993	Yes	Caribbean
Saint Lucia	LCA	Saint Lucia Olympic Committee	Alfred Emmanuel	1987/1993	Yes	Caribbean
Saint Vincent and the Grenadines	VIN	Saint Vincent and the Grenadines Olympic Committee	George Trevor Bailey	1982/1987	Yes	Caribbean
Suriname	SUR	Suriname Olympic Committee	Ramon Tjon-A-Fat	1959	Yes	South America (Note: Geographically a part of South America, Suriname also competes in the Central American and Caribbean Games.)
Trinidad and Tobago	TTO	Trinidad and Tobago Olympic Committee	Diane Henderson	1946/1948	Yes	Caribbean (Note: Geographically near South America, Trinidad and Tobago only competes in the Central American and Caribbean Games.)
United States	USA	United States Olympic & Paralympic Committee	Gene Sykes	1894	Yes	Northern America (Note: Northern America does not have a regional multi-sport event, the United States only competes in the Pan American Games.)
Uruguay	URU	Uruguayan Olympic Committee	Julio César Maglione	1923	Yes	South America
Venezuela	VEN	Venezuelan Olympic Committee	Eduardo Álvarez Camacho	1935	Yes	South America/Caribbean/Bolivarian
U.S. Virgin Islands	ISV	Virgin Islands Olympic Committee	Angel L. Morales	1967	Yes	Caribbean

Former member: Netherlands Antilles Olympic Committee

There are some nations which are not members of the Panam Sports because they are not independent countries:

- Anguilla, the Falkland Islands, Montserrat, and the Turks and Caicos Islands are British Overseas Territories without internal autonomy and so failed to create their own National Olympic Committees and therefore are not members of the Panam Sports.
- Bonaire, Curaçao, Saba, Sint Eustatius, and Sint Maarten are parts of the Dutch Caribbean since 2010. With the Dissolution of the Netherlands Antilles later in that year, the athletes from these territories were allowed to compete at the 2011 Pan American Games with the older denomination. This also happened with these athletes at the 2012 Summer Olympics, but they were parts of the Independent Olympic Athletes team. Since 2013, athletes from these five territories have been representing Aruba instead.
- French Guiana, Guadeloupe, Martinique, Saint Barthélemy, Saint Martin, and Saint Pierre and Miquelon are not members of the Panam Sports as they are overseas departments and collectivities of France. Nevertheless, French Guiana participated in the 1951 Pan American Games. Guadeloupe and Martinique also competed in the 2003 Pan American Games.
- Greenland is an autonomous territory within the Kingdom of Denmark and geopolitically associated with Europe. Greenland is the only Northern America territory which is not a member of Panam Sports.

== Presidents ==
S. No.	Name	Country	Tenure
1.	Avery Brundage	United States	1948–1951
2.	José de Jesús Clark Flores	Mexico	1951–1955
3.	Doug Roby	United States	1955–1959
4.	José de Jesús Clark Flores	Mexico	1959–1971
5.	Sylvio de Magalhaes Padilha^{1}	Brazil	1971–1971
6.	José Beracasa	Venezuela	1971–1975
7.	Mario Vázquez Raña	Mexico	1975–2015
8.	Ivar Sisniega	Mexico	2015–2015
9.	Julio César Maglione	Uruguay	2015–2017
10.	Neven Ilic	Chile	2017–present

^1 Served as acting president for two months until new election.

== Athlete Commission ==
In 2011, a new Panam Sports Athlete Commission was formed. Former Canadian rhythmic gymnast and three-time Pan American Games gold medalist Alexandra Orlando was selected the president of the commission. The commission will be made up of seven athletes (five current and two former) with two being reserved for non-Olympic sports.

Member	Country	Since	Pan American Games Participation
Alexandra Orlando	Canada	2011	2003–2007
Mijaín López	Cuba	2011	2003–2019
Samyr Lainé	Haiti	2011	2003–2011
Andrea Estrada	Guatemala	2011	2011
Guillermo Perez	Mexico	2011	2011
Pedro Causil	Colombia	2011	2011
Shannon Nishi	United States	2011	2011

== Debut of countries per Games ==
Games	Host	Year	Debuting Countries	Total
I	(Argentina) Buenos Aires	1951	Argentina, Brazil, Chile, Colombia, Costa Rica, Cuba, Ecuador, El Salvador, Guatemala, Haiti, Jamaica, Mexico, Nicaragua, Panama, Paraguay, Peru, Trinidad and Tobago, United States, Uruguay, Venezuela.	20
II	Mexico City	1955	Bahamas, Canada, Dominican Republic, Netherlands Antilles, Puerto Rico.	5
III	(United States) Chicago	1959	Guyana.	1
IV	(Brazil) São Paulo	1963	Barbados.	1
V	(Canada) Winnipeg	1967	Belize, Bolivia, Bermuda, Virgin Islands.	4
VI	(Colombia) Cali	1971	–	0
VII	Mexico City	1975	Honduras.	1
VIII	(Puerto Rico) San Juan	1979	Antigua and Barbuda.	1
IX	(Venezuela) Caracas	1983	British Virgin Islands, Suriname.	2
X	(United States) Indianapolis	1987	Aruba, Cayman Islands, Grenada.	3
XI	(Cuba) Havana	1991	Saint Vincent and the Grenadines.	1
XII	(Argentina) Mar del Plata	1995	Dominica, Saint Kitts and Nevis, Saint Lucia.	3
XIII	(Canada) Winnipeg	1999	–	0
XIV	(Dominican Republic) Santo Domingo	2003	–	0
XV	(Brazil) Rio de Janeiro	2007	–	0
XVI	(Mexico) Guadalajara	2011	–	0
XVII	(Canada) Toronto	2015	–	0
XVIII	(Peru) Lima	2019	-	0
XIX	(Chile) Santiago	2023	-	0
XX	(Peru) Lima	2027	Future	-
XXI	-	2031	Future	-

== Exclusion of indigenous sports ==
Despite criticisms that Ulama, the Mesoamerican Ballgame and Lacrosse are not included in the program of the Pan American Games, the number of countries practicing the sport is too small for the sports to be added to the program. As of 2023, there are 19 national federations in the Americas affiliated with World Lacrosse with a minimum number of Panam Sports recognition being 14 (Argentina, Barbados, Bermuda, Canada, United States, Colombia, Costa Rica, Guatemala, Jamaica, Mexico, Peru, Puerto Rico, Chile, Ecuador, Haiti, the Dominican Republic, Panama, and the United States Virgin Islands). However, the Iroquois nation is not recognized as a National Olympic Committee by Panam Sports or the IOC. Thus, there are at this time 14 regional member nations of World Lacrosse, enough for the sport to be included in the Pan Am Games as early as 2027 or 2031. Lacrosse is recognized by the Global Association of International Sports Federations and by the International Olympic Committee and will be played in a six-a-side format at the 2028 Summer Olympics in Los Angeles, but the number of National Federations have to grow to sport to be added at the Pan-An Games program. However, this is not the case with ulama, which inhibits its participation in the Pan American Games. It is a possibility that lacrosse will be included in the program of the Games in the future.

== See also ==
- Americas Paralympic Committee
- Pan American Games
