= Instituto de Desenvolvimento Educacional =

Brazilian private institution

The Instituto de Desenvolvimento Educacional (Educational Development Institute, IDE) is a Brazilian private institution established in 2003 to develop and manage a single distribution network at the domestic and international levels for the continuing education programs developed by the various Fundação Getúlio Vargas schools and institutes: EBAPE, EAESP, EPGE, EESP, FGV Direito Rio, Direito GV e CPDOC.

IDE comprehends the Graduate Program FGV Management; the Distance Learning Program (FGV Online), the Customized Courses Program (FGV Cursos Corporativos), the Quality and Business Intelligence Center and Quality Certification.

The institute also relies on support from the Academic Council − made up of the directors of member schools and institutes and charged with the technical and academic validation of the long-term courses IDE markets.
