= Idee =

Idee or Idée may refer to:

== People ==
- Émile Idée (1920–2024), French professional road bicycle racer

== Other ==
- Idée, Inc., creator of image search engine TinEye
- Idée fixe (psychology), a fixation
- Idée Fixe (album), 1978 album by Aerolit
- Idée reçue, a received or accepted idea
- "Idee Stupide", 2006 single released by Fabri Fibra
- Les idées de ma maison (disambiguation)

== See also ==
- Idea
- Ide (disambiguation)
- Ides (disambiguation)
- Ideen (disambiguation)
- Idée fixe (disambiguation)
