= Ideen =

Ideen may refer to:

- Ideen I, a 1913 philosophical work by Edmund Husserl (Ideen zu einer reinen Phänomenologie und phänomenologischen Philosophie – Erstes Buch: Allgemeine Einführung in die reine Phänomenologie, translated as Ideas Pertaining to a Pure Phenomenology and to a Phenomenological Philosophy – First Book: General Introduction to a Pure Phenomenology)
- Ideen II, a posthumous philosophical work by Edmund Husserl withheld until 1952 (Ideen zu einer reinen Phänomenologie und phänomenologischen Philosophie – Zweites Buch: Phänomenologische Untersuchungen zur Konstitution, translated as Ideas Pertaining to a Pure Phenomenology and to a Phenomenological Philosophy – Second Book: Studies in the Phenomenology of Constitution)
- Ideen III, a posthumous philosophical work by Edmund Husserl withheld until 1952 (Ideen zu einer reinen Phänomenologie und phänomenologischen Philosophie – Drittes Buch: Die Phänomenologie und die Fundamente der Wissenschaften, translated as Ideas Pertaining to a Pure Phenomenology and to a Phenomenological Philosophy – Third Book: Phenomenology and the Foundations of the Sciences)
- Ideen & Argumente, philosophical book series edited by Lutz Wingert
- Deutschland – Land der Ideen, a German national marketing initiative (German Wikipedia)

== See also ==
- Idea
- Ide (disambiguation)
- Ideas (disambiguation)
- Ides (disambiguation)
- Idee (disambiguation)
