= Sonia Fleury =

Brazilian political scientist and professor

Dr. Sonia Fleury
- Born: Brazil
- Education: University of Notre Dame
- Occupations: political scientist, professor and researcher

Sonia Maria Fleury Teixeira also simply known as Sonia Fleury, is a Brazilian political scientist, researcher and professor. She has written and published over 120 research articles in scientific magazines and editorials.

== Career ==
Sonia holds a doctorate degree in political science, bachelor's degree in psychology and also pursued her master's degree in sociology. She has been a faculty fellow at the Kellogg Institute at the University of Notre Dame in USA.

She has served as a prominent researcher at the Oswaldo Cruz Foundation in Brazil and also served as a professor at the National School of Public Health in Brazil until 1995. In addition, she has also worked as a consultant for Brazilian social ministries, IDB, UNDP, World Bank, WHO, SELA and CLAD.

She currently serves as a senior researcher at the Escola Brasileira de Administração Pública e de Empresas, Fundação Getulio Vargas. Sonia has also been often critical about Brazilian government's mishandling of the COVID-19 pandemic in Brazil.
