= The Idea =

The Idea may refer to:

- The Idea (book), a 1920 wordless novel by Frans Masereel
- The Idea (1932 film), an animated film by Berthold Bartosch based on the Masereel novel
- "The Idea", a 1976 short story by Raymond Carver from Will You Please Be Quiet, Please?
- "The Idea" a 2022 single by Blackbear from In Loving Memory

== See also ==
- Idea (disambiguation)
- Ideas (disambiguation)
