= 2014 Brazilian economic crisis =

Crisis that began during the presidency of Dilma Rousseff

January 2016 cover of The Economist magazine about the crisis. The cover depicts then-president Dilma Rousseff.

From mid-2014 until late 2016, Brazil experienced a severe economic crisis. The country's Gross Domestic Product (GDP) fell by 3.5% in 2015 and 3.3% in 2016, after which a small economic recovery began. That recovery continued until 2020, when the COVID-19 pandemic began to impact the economy again.

The economic crisis occurred alongside a political crisis that resulted in the impeachment of president Dilma Rousseff. These events combined caused mass popular dissatisfaction with the political system.

The cause of the crisis was the aforementioned political crisis, as well as the 2014 commodity price shock, which negatively affected Brazil's exports and reduced the entrance of foreign capital into the economy. However, the most important cause was internal, which is associated with economic measures that didn't achieve the expected results. Adopted in 2011, these measures are known as the nova matriz econômica ("new economic matrix", in a free translation).

During the economic crisis, high unemployment rates were reported throughout the country, and there was widespread uncertainty regarding Brazil's economic future following a series of political scandals. In the first quarter of 2017, Brazil's GDP rose by 1%. This was the first GDP increase to occur in eight consecutive quarters. Finance Minister Henrique Meirelles announced that Brazil had "emerged from the greatest crisis of the century". However, the rise in GDP marked only the end of a technical recession, not the end of the crisis. The recession was the second most severe in the country's history, and was followed by the slowest recovery. The GDP only surpassed that of early 2014 by mid-2022.

== Context ==
=== Economic ===
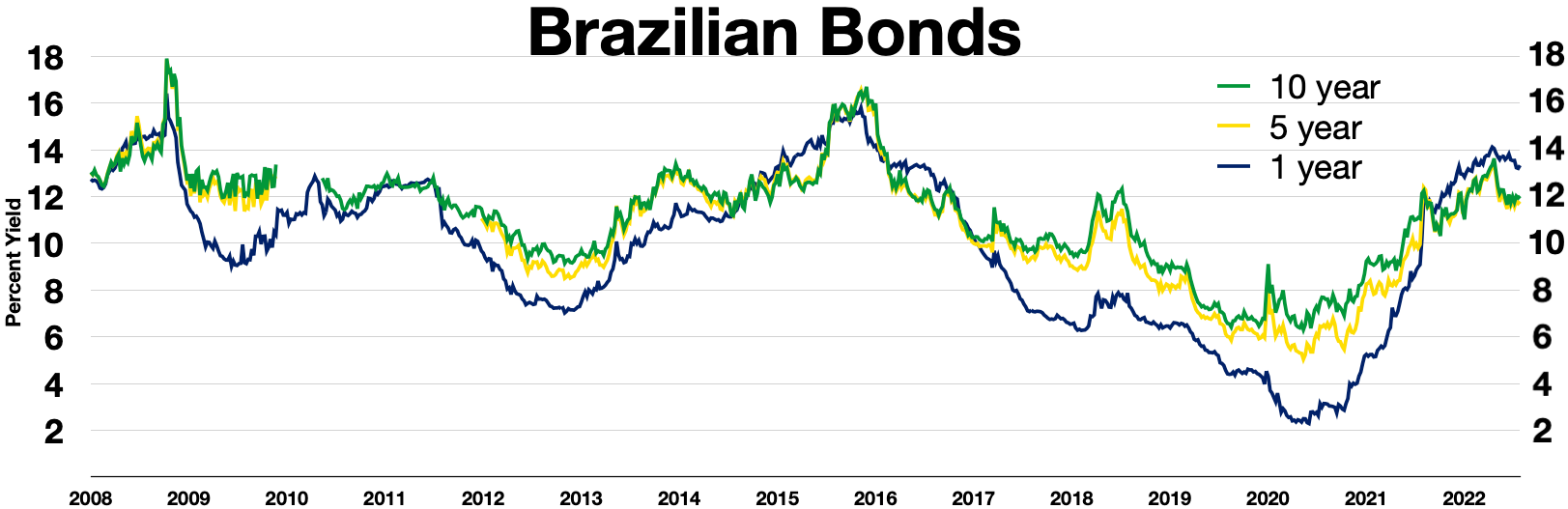
Brazilian bonds had an Inverted yield curve in August 2014 when the 1 year bond got above the 10 year bond 10 year bond 5 year bond 1 year bond

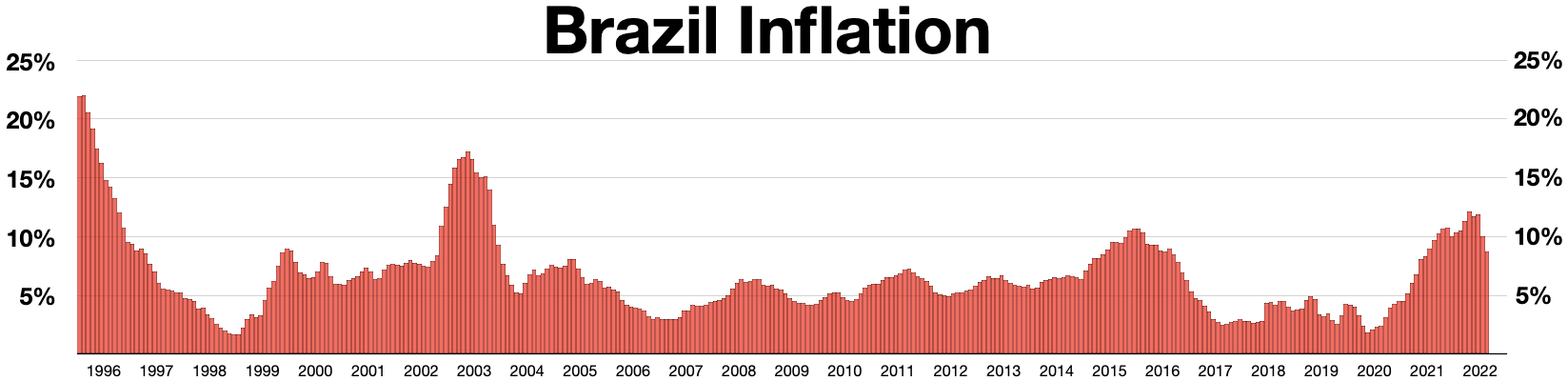
Brazil inflation 1996-2022

Brazil's economy is largely dependent on the export of commodities, particularly iron ore, petroleum and soy. From the late 1990s till 2012, prices for these export commodities rose significantly (partly because of increasing demand from China), resulting in about two decades of economic growth. As a result of the Great Recession, Brazil's GDP dropped sharply and unemployment rose. During Luiz Inácio Lula da Silva's left-wing presidency from 2003 to 2010, the government redistributed wealth through welfare programs and raised the minimum wage in order to increase consumption.

In response to critics of Lula's socialist economic stance, his successor, Dilma Rousseff (president during the crisis), introduced macroeconomic tax exemptions and subsidies. These policies are widely acknowledged as a major factor in the 2014–16 economic crisis.

=== Political ===
The economic crisis was followed and intensified by a political crisis. In 2014, a series of corruption scandals uncovered by Operation Car Wash engulfed many influential politicians. In the presidential election of the same year, President Dilma Rousseff was re-elected to a second term, defeating the PSDB candidate Aécio Neves by a narrow margin. The result was not recognized by a section of the opposition and provoked popular discontent. Due to the disputed legitimacy of the election, the Operation Car Wash investigation, and the economic crisis; dissatisfaction with the government became widespread. By 2015, Rousseff's approval rating had plummeted to 8% according to a Datafolha survey.

== Causes ==
=== Errors in macroeconomic policy ===
Cover of The Economist in January 2016 ("Brazil's fall: Dilma Rousseff and the disastrous year ahead"), highlighting the negative aspect of the then-president

According to Gustavo Franco, President of the Central Bank during the FHC government, the main cause of the crisis was internal and related to "local macroeconomic measures that went wrong."

A 2017 academic study on the subject arrived at the following conclusion regarding the origin of the crisis:

The exhaustion of the NEM [new economic matrix] due to the loss of the government's financial capacity reduced several investments in the Brazilian economy from 2015 onward, with the sharp reduction in Petrobras' investment being a notable example. The ensuing fiscal sustainability crisis raised country risk, long-term interest rates, and uncertainty, substantially reducing consumption and investment in 2015 and 2016. The reestablishment of prices and the necessary monetary policy to bring inflation back to target also contributed to the recession, mainly due to the loss of credibility of the Central Bank. [...]

— Filho, Fernando de Holanda Barbosa (2017). "A crise econômica de 2014/2017". Estudos Avançados. 31 (89).

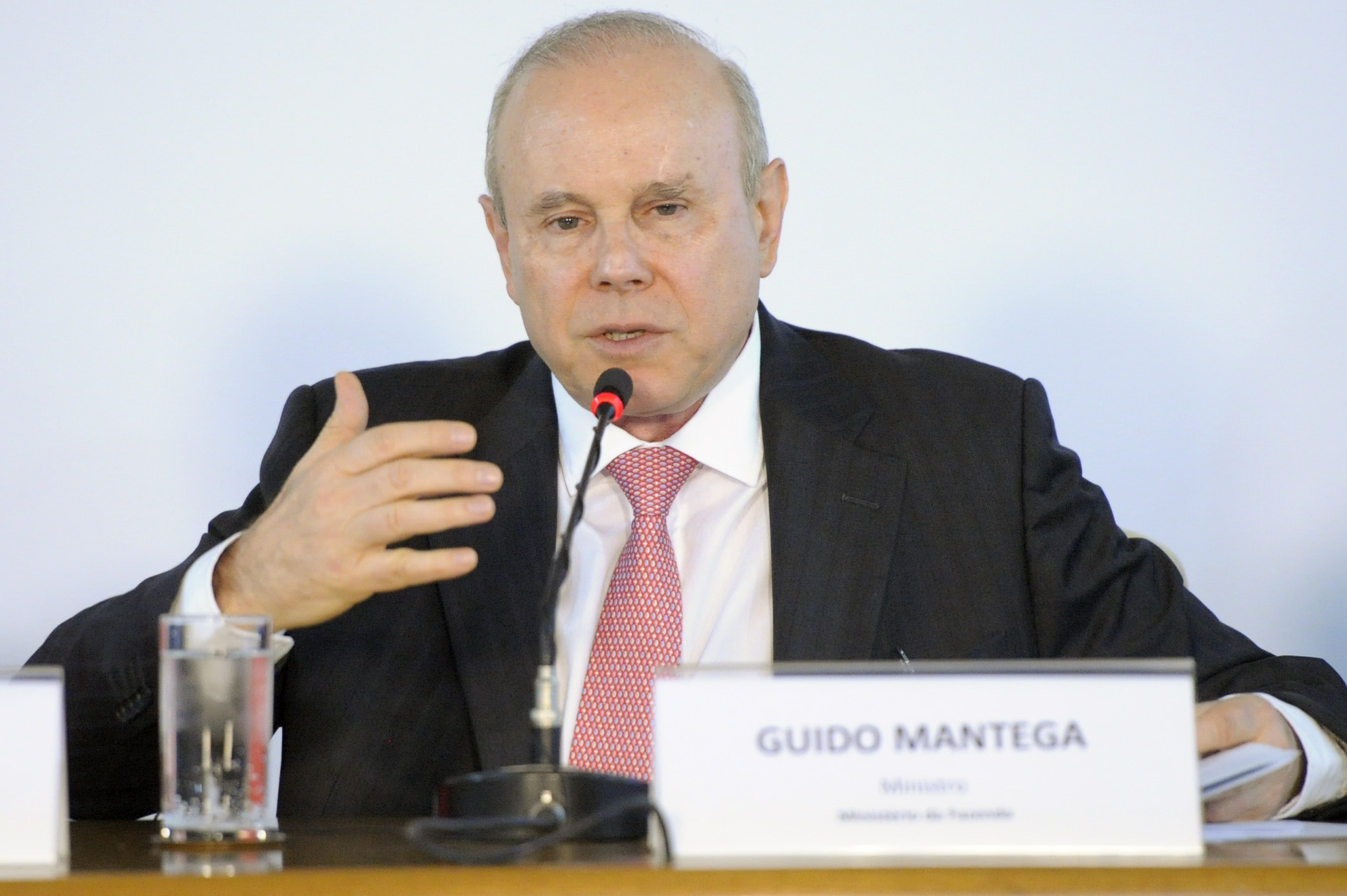
Guido Mantega, Minister of Finance during the first Dilma government. In July 2012, Mantega admitted for the first time that the government practiced a new "macroeconomic matrix".

Previously, the state had played a crucial role in expanding the domestic market through consumer incentives, such as raising the minimum wage, income transfers, and credit expansion. However, by the end of the Lula government, there was a growing perception that this strategy would be unsustainable. On May 26, 2011, an article published in Folha de S.Paulo titled "an agreement for the Brazilian industry" reaffirmed the importance of that economic policy of the Lula government but criticized the shrinking share of the national industry in GDP and the substitution of domestic production with imported industrial products. The article was signed, among others, by Paulo Skaf, president of the Federation of Industries of the State of São Paulo (FIESP), who years later would request and support Dilma's impeachment.

Dilma, an economics graduate from an industrialist school, agreed with the demands. Therefore, the new economic matrix was a set of measures to benefit the industrial sector, aiming to reduce the costs of national companies and increase competitiveness against foreign competition. However, the industry did not react. Industrial production, which had grown by 2.7% in 2010, declined by 0.9% and 3.7% in the following two years, damaging government revenue and, consequently, public investments.

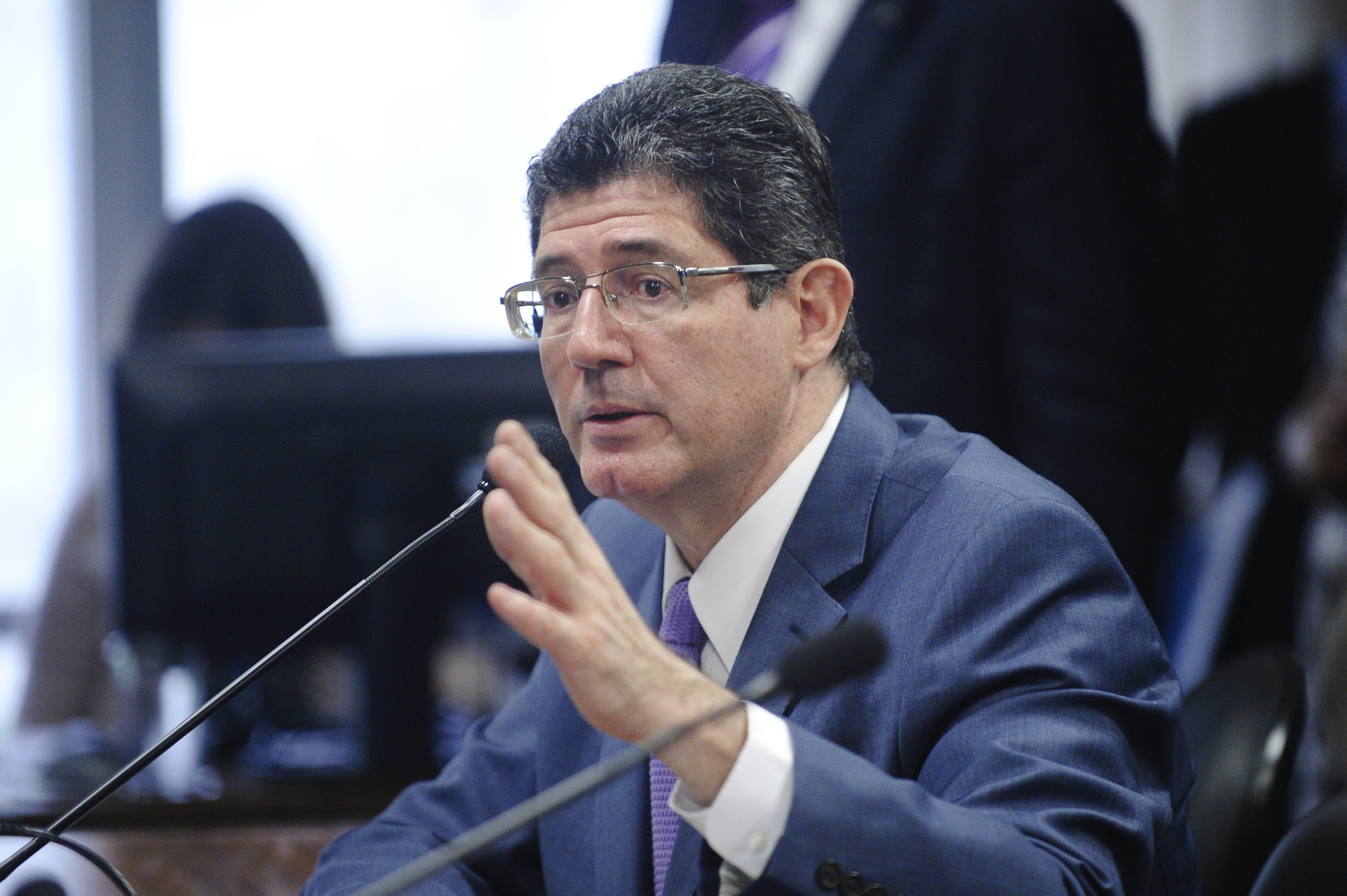
Joaquim Levy, Minister responsible for fiscal adjustment, in March 2015

In an attempt to reverse the deterioration in public accounts due to falling revenue, a fiscal adjustment was implemented in 2014, which included highly recessive policies (i.e., aimed at reducing expenses and increasing taxes). These policies mainly involved cutting public expenses and investments, such as cuts to the Growth Acceleration Program (PAC). The adjustment continued throughout 2015. In that year, there was a sharp reduction in administered prices. (See section Anticrisis measures.) These measures further deepened the crisis because, according to Carvalho, there was a decrease in public investments. Additionally, the sharp adjustment of administered prices and the significant depreciation of the currency led to soaring inflation, reaching over 10%. This increase, in turn, caused the Selic Rate to rise successively until reaching 14.25% per year. The fiscal adjustment was not successful even in its main objective, which was to achieve a surplus in public accounts, as the recession in which the country found itself reduced government revenues.

=== Commodities Devaluation ===
Average annual growth of commodity prices
| Period | Change (% per year) |
| 1999-2002 | 10.3 |
| 2003-2005 | 19.1 |
| 2006-2010 | 10.5 |
2011-2014
2015-2016

An external cause identified was the slowdown of the Chinese economy, Brazil's largest trading partner. This slowdown led to a sharp drop in commodity prices, which are the basis of Brazilian exports. As a result, Brazil's trade surplus plummeted and some exporting companies, such as Usiminas and Vale, suffered heavy losses. According to Roberto Dumas, a professor at Insper, the government made a strategic mistake during the commodity supercycle by stimulating consumption instead of prioritizing industrialization and improving productive capacity.

According to Steven Tobin from the International Labour Organization (ILO) Research Department, the decrease in external demand, especially from China, combined with the fall in commodity prices in the second half of 2014, were factors that contributed to the crisis. However, Tobin also stated that this unfavorable external scenario revealed structural weaknesses in the country, such as low productivity. Between June and December 2014, the commodity price index published by the International Monetary Fund (IMF) experienced a cumulative decline of 29.3%, which continued to increase until it was interrupted in January 2016.

In 2015, The Economist magazine also stated that the immediate causes of the crisis were external, and that the decline in commodity prices partly explained the crisis. The publication also argued that then-president Dilma Rousseff could have made better use of the commodity boom of the 2000s to reduce the bloated state, which consumed 36% of GDP in taxes. Instead, the government chose to guarantee subsidized loans and costly tax incentives for favored industries.

Silvia Matos, a researcher at the Brazilian Institute of Economics (FGV), concluded that external factors were responsible for 30% of the crisis.

Silvia Matos shows [...] through a comparative analysis that, although other economies have also experienced a growth reduction in recent years, the Brazilian deceleration was more intense. This occurred even when compared to Latin American countries, which form a natural control group for performance comparisons. Then, she confirms this diagnosis through an econometric analysis of panel data with a sample of 14 emerging countries. In fact, the results indicate that only 30% of the Brazilian deceleration can be explained by external factors. Based on this, Silvia Matos concludes that factors specific to our economy are the most relevant in explaining the worsening performance of the Brazilian economy

— FGV (4 April 2017). A Crise de Crescimento do Brasil. Brazil: Elsevier Brasil. ISBN 9788535266382.

=== Political Crisis ===
In the international context of major protests following the 2008 financial crisis, such as the Arab Spring in the Arab world, Occupy Wall Street in the United States, and Los Indignados in Spain, Brazil experienced major protests in 2013, the largest since the demonstrations for the impeachment of Fernando Collor in 1992. The protesters initially challenged increases in public transportation fares but later questioned the hosting of FIFA mega-events (Confederations Cup and World Cup) and political corruption. In response, the federal government announced measures to try to address the protesters' demands and the National Congress of Brazil passed a series of concessions, known as the "positive agenda."

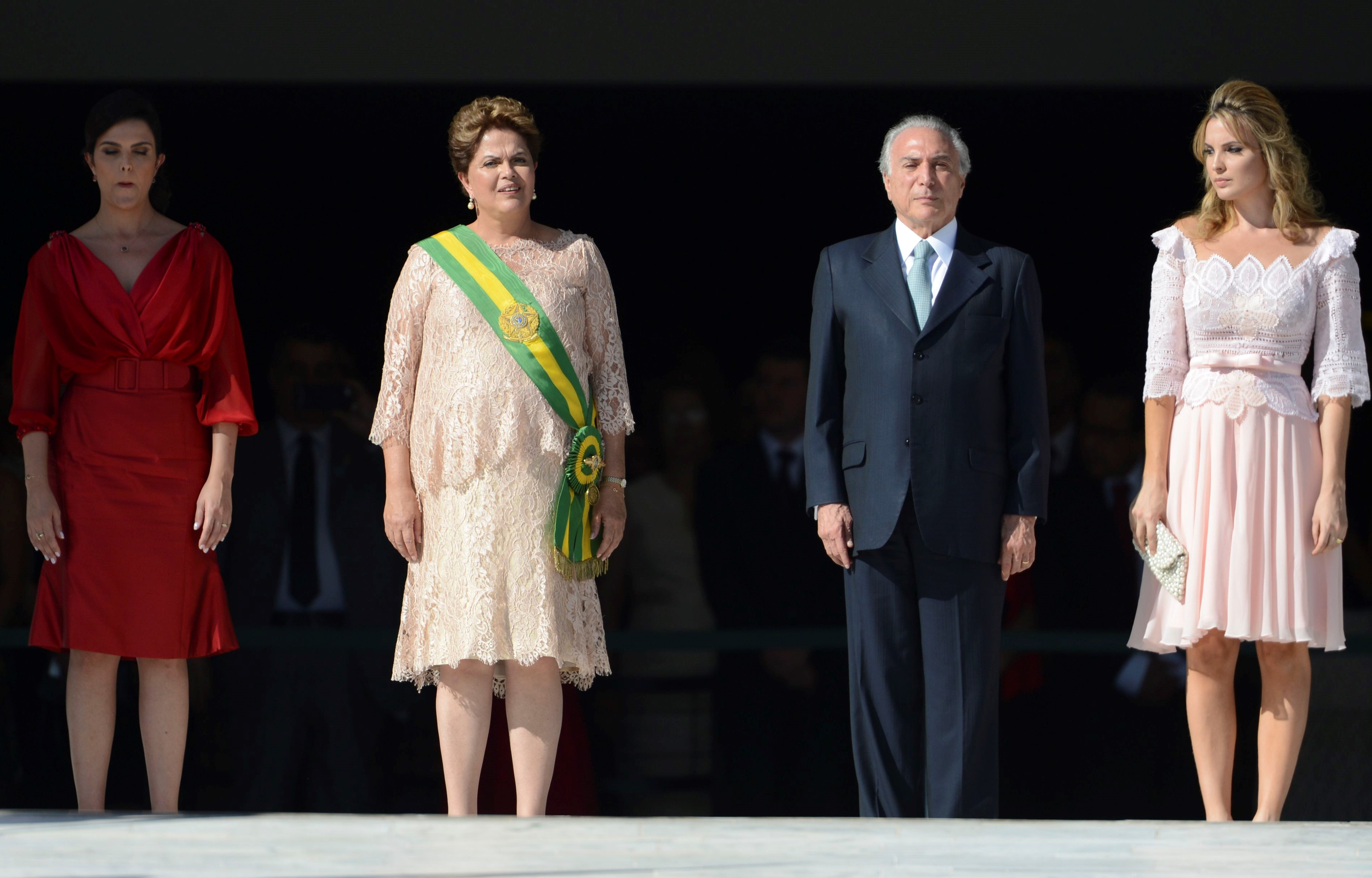
Dilma Rousseff at her inauguration as president in 2015, alongside her vice president, Michel Temer

The following year, in 2014, the Operation Car Wash investigation began, revealing a vast corruption scheme involving the political class and parties. The re-election of Dilma Rousseff a few months later exacerbated the political crisis. Running for a second term as a candidate for the Workers' Party, Dilma won the presidential election that year, defeating the candidate from the Brazilian Social Democracy Party (PSDB), Aécio Neves, in the most fiercely contested presidential race in the country's history at that time. The election was also marked by turmoil and controversies, mainly due to Operation Car Wash.

In this context of political crisis, the Congress began to vote on measures that could generate more expenses for the government. These were called "bills bombs" (pautas-bomba). If the president vetoed any of these bills, the President of the Chamber of Deputies, Eduardo Cunha, would entertain an impeachment request against her. These bills were used as instruments of blackmail. The proposed spending increases voted by Congress occurred at the same time the government intended to make cuts to achieve the fiscal target for the year. In a scenario of an economy in crisis, this hindered the rebalancing of public accounts by increasing state expenses and making the economic adjustments proposed by Dilma unviable.

In December 2015, after the PT voted for the impeachment of Eduardo Cunha (who was involved in corruption scandals), he accepted an impeachment request against Dilma for alleged crime of responsibility. On May 12, 2016, the Federal Senate removed her from the presidency for 180 days. Immediately, her vice-president Michel Temer assumed the position temporarily. Even though he was acting president but behaving as if he were the definitive president, Temer established his government plan and made "stopping the free fall in economic activity" a priority in his first speech as president.

However, early in his government, Temer became involved in controversies due to his ministers who were being investigated in the scope of Operation Car Wash, as well as himself. The scandals affected the progress of the government's proposed reforms aimed at economic recovery. Not only did they affect the progress itself, but they also required Temer to allocate many resources to maintain his allied base cohesive. The total amount of funds released in 2017 for parliamentary amendments (a legal mechanism used for political negotiations) increased from 959 million to 1.5 billion reais just in June, the month following the JBS scandal. All the corruption scandals involving the Temer government, combined with the unpopular reform proposals, caused Temer's approval rating, according to CNI/Ibope polls, to drop to 3 percent in September 2017, even lower than Dilma's.

Therefore, Dilma's impeachment and the beginning of the Temer government were not able to halt the political crisis or the economic crisis. The persistence of the political crisis continued to hinder economic recovery because the scandals affect the markets, especially those subject to short-term speculative movements, such as the stock market and the foreign exchange market, which are the first to react. Although Temer survived, his image was damaged. Several popular protests questioned whether he could remain in office.

=== Economic Impacts of Operation Car Wash ===
Operation Car Wash mainly affected the construction and oil sectors. A study by the Dieese, published in March 2021, indicated that about 4.4 million jobs were lost in the country from 2014 to 2017 as a result of Operation Car Wash. Of these, 1.1 million were in the construction sector. During the same period, the sector recorded a negative balance between hirings and dismissals of 991,734 formal positions. According to a study published in 2018 by the Independent Fiscal Institution, since the beginning of 2014, the construction industry experienced 14 quarters of negative results, with a negative impact of 0.9 percentage points per quarter. The study also pointed out that the sector was a limiting factor to the recovery trajectory of industrial GDP and economic activity in aggregate terms.

Some consultancies estimated that the economic contraction caused by Operation Car Wash would be around 1% to 1.5% of the GDP per year. The direct and indirect effects of Operation Car Wash on the country's economy may have caused, according to a projection by the consulting firm Go Associados for 2015, a contraction of more than 140 billion reais in the country's economy. According to a study by consultancy Tendências, the recession could be three times smaller without the impacts of the operation on the economy.

== Consequences ==
=== Unemployment ===
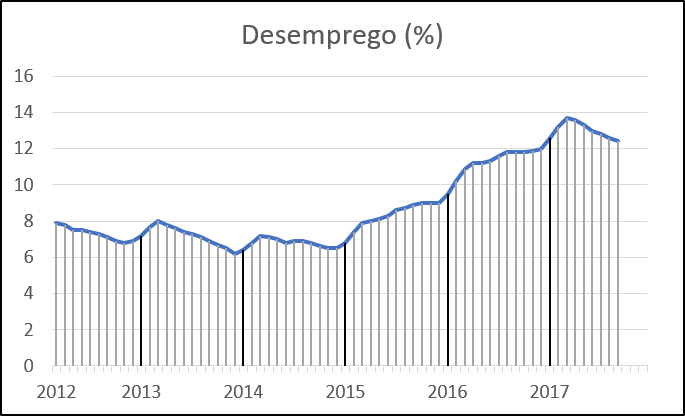
The unemployment rate from 2012 to 2017. Each vertical line corresponds to a month.

Before the recession, Brazil's unemployment rate hovered around 6.8% for most of 2014, but began increasing in February 2015, resulting in a 2015 average of 8.5%. The economy lost more than 1.5 million jobs throughout 2015, fueling public discontent against the political establishment and the political leadership of the Worker's Party and President Dilma Rousseff. The unemployment rate continued to rise throughout 2016 to finish the year at 12.0%, with 12.3 million people unemployed and an estimated 2.8 million private-sector jobs cut over the preceding two years.

Young people were affected most by the worsening job market. While the overall unemployment rate was 12.7% in the first quarter of 2019, the rate in people from 14 to 17 years was 44.5% and 27.3% for people from 18 to 24 years.

Experts expressed concern for the unintended economic and social repercussions for Brazil's younger population, as the economic crisis decreased social security contributions and depreciated human capital (caused by the decrease in the technical capacity of future workers).

=== Recession ===
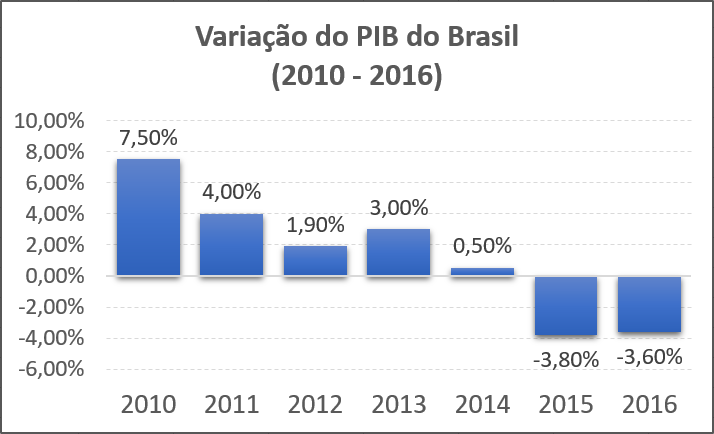
Change in GDP from 2010 to 2016 in Brazil. Growth slowed significantly in 2014 which was followed by two consecutive drops. (Note: The values for 2015 and 2016 were later revised to 3,5% and 3,3%, respectively.)

At the end of the second quarter of 2014, the country was in a technical recession. According to some Brazilian economists, a technical recession is negative economic growth for two consecutive quarters. It is different from an actual recession, in which the situation of the country depreciates significantly. Finance Minister, Guido Mantega, lessened the economic result and, in comparison to Europe, declared that:

[In Brazil] we're talking about two trimesters [of negative GDP growth], and we know that the economy is in motion. Recession is when there are rising unemployment and decreasing income. Here we have the opposite.

— Guido Mantega, Finance Minister

Regardless of Mantega's statements, specialists had already spotted signs that a strong recession was well underway, citing the technical recession and later, the small growth of 0.5% at the end of 2014. The expectations were confirmed in the next year when the economy shrunk by 3.5%. In 2016, there was another sharp decrease of 3.3%. In the first trimester of 2017, the GDP rose for the first time after eight consecutive trimesters of negative growth.

The recession caused a fiscal crisis and an increasing budget deficit which, according to Bloomberg, was "the largest-ever primary budget gap ... as a two-year economic recession sapped tax collection while expenses grew further." The government deficit reached 5.8 billion reais (US$1.7 billion) in the first three months of 2016, the widest reported since December 2001. The two-year fiscal deterioration can be explained by the decrease in government revenue from taxes as a result of the recession, while government expenses have been growing constantly.

=== Increase in economic inequality ===
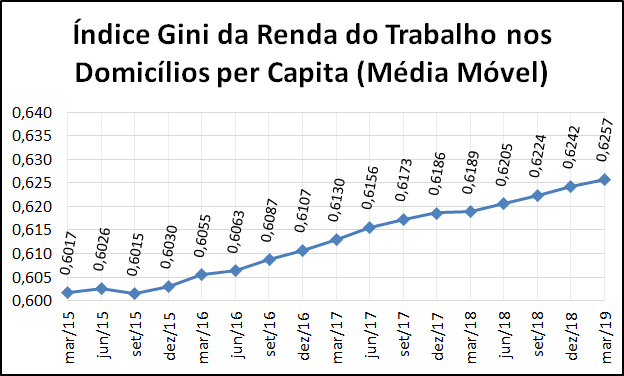
Evolution of the Gini coefficient in Brazil from 2012 to 2019. Source: Ibre/FGV

A 2019 study by the Instituto Brasileiro de Economia (IBRE), part of Fundação Getúlio Vargas (FGV), obtained by the magazine Valor Econômico, showed that the Gini coefficient, which measures the economic inequality in society from 0 to 1, had increased year after year since 2015 and reached its peak in March 2019.

In seven years, the accumulated wealth of the top 10% rose by 8.5%, while that of the 40% poorest dropped 14%. The research showed that people with lower incomes suffered the effects of the crisis more intensely and recovered from the crisis slower.

According to an Ibre researcher, Daniel Duque, the recovery of the job market benefited the most qualified and experienced, reinforcing inequality. Many underqualified people gave up trying to get a job, and the loss of hope was at a "[...] record high, and it helps to explain why, even after the decrease in unemployment, inequality kept rising."

=== Emigration ===
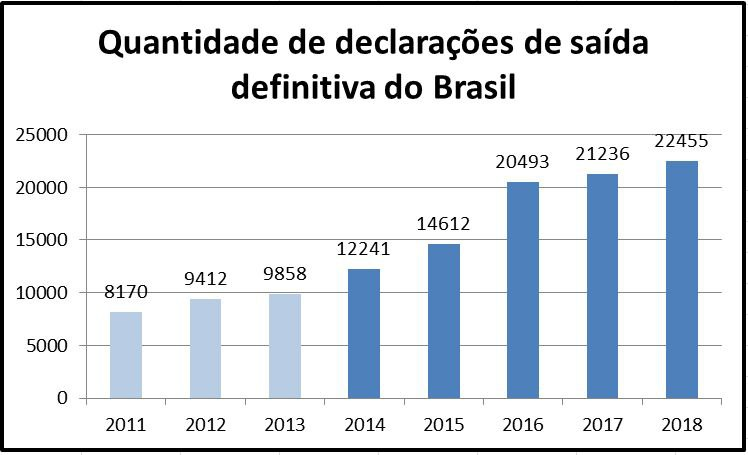
Number of declarations of definite emigration from the country. Source: Receita Federal.

The number of declarations of definitive departure from the country began to grow in the first year of crisis and has increased steadily ever since, according to Receita Federal. Among the countries that received the most Brazilian citizens were the United States, Japan and Canada, which, due to low unemployment and aging populations among other reasons, needed a boost to decrease the age of the workforce. Another destination was Portugal, which conceded Portuguese citizenship to 8,000 Brazilians only in 2016, according to Eurostat. Besides the crisis, another reason for the emigration were the elevated levels of criminality.

According to a JBJ Partners employee (a company specialized in expatriation to the United States), many who fled Brazil were qualified workers:

We're talking about qualified people. The profile of the immigrant is no longer that of the poor individual looking for better opportunities. They are high executives, who are abandoning their careers to open a business abroad, people with Ph.D., which is sad because the country is losing resources.

— Jorge Botrel, a JBJ partner.

An OECD report shows an even higher number. In 2016 80,000 Brazilians emigrated legally to one of the member states of the OECD, whereas 99,000 did so in 2017. Similarly, data from Receita Federal shows that the number of people leaving Brazil increased in consecutive years since the beginning of the crisis.

=== Credit rating ===
This is a table of the credit ratings of the Brazilian economy according to Trading Economics.

| Agency | Rating | Outlook | Date |
|---|---|---|---|
| Fitch | BB | negative | May 5, 2016 |
| TE | 34 | negative | Apr 16 2016 |
| Moody's | Ba2 | negative | Feb 24 2016 |
| S&P | BB | negative | Feb 17 2016 |

== Anti-crisis measures ==
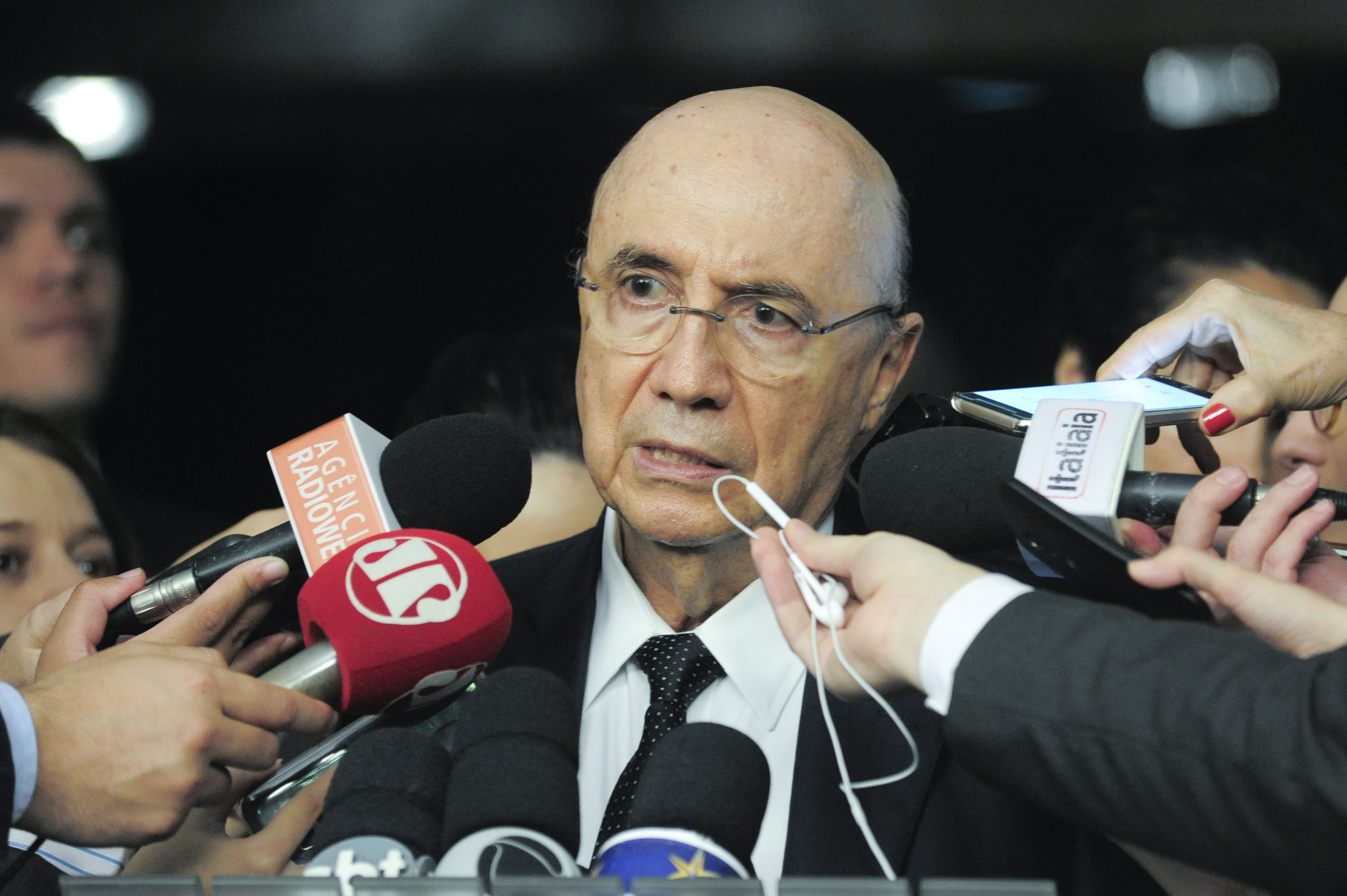
Henrique Meirelles, the Minister of Finance from May 2016 to April 2018

Since the impeachment of Dilma Rousseff and Michel Temer's subsequent rise to power, several measures, most of which are unpopular, were implemented or proposed to get the economy back on track. The most important of which were:

- The 95º Constitutional amendment (a.k.a. "new fiscal regime"): Constitutional amendment which established a "ceiling" (upper limit) to government spending for the next 20 years;
- The Outsourcing law, which allows companies to hire outsourced employees to work on primary activities, and not just secondary activities (such as security or cleaning);
- The 2017 labor reform, a significant change in the Consolidation of Labor Laws; and
- a pension reform, which the government failed to approve.

One year after the labor reform was approved, however, it was verified that the decrease in unemployment was minimal, while the contracts of intermittent, outsourced and temporary labor increased.

== Recovery ==
In early 2017, there were already signals that the economy was beginning to recover, however, it was agreed that the process would be long and slow.

In June 2017, a 1% rise in GDP in the first quarter of the year was reported. It was the first rise of the GDP after eight consecutive falls (two years). Minister of Finance Henrique Meirelles said that the country had left the "greatest recession of the century." However, economists say that the growth characterizes only the end of the "technical recession" and that it is still too early to claim that the crisis is over, given that unemployment remains high and there's still widespread uncertainty regarding the future of the economy, especially in the aftermath of the recent political scandals.

== Comparison with other crises ==
Real GDP growth in 2016. Source: CIA World Factbook

In countries with similar size and wealth, there were a few, but less severe crises in the same period. In 2015, among OECD countries, only Russia went through a recession. Even after the economic sanctions imposed by other countries due to the Russo-Ukrainian war, Russia's GDP fell by only 4% in two years (2015 and 2016). Few other countries in this period were going through a recession, which reinforces the argument that the crisis in Brazil was mainly due to local causes.

In comparison to other crises in Brazil, it was verified that the 2014 crisis was not the deepest recession of Brazilian history, as previously thought. After the GDP values for 2015 and 2016 were reviewed by the Brazilian Institute of Geography and Statistics (IBGE), the economy shrank by 8.2% in the period, in contrast to the 8.5% in the 1981 recession. Despite the relative mildness, the crisis was prolonged, being followed by the slowest economic recovery in Brazilian history.

According to Codace (committee part of Fundação Getúlio Vargas), the 1981 crisis lasted nine economic quarters, reached its peak in the first quarter of 1983 and, since then, took seven quarters for the GDP the reach its pre-crisis level. Later, the 1989-1992 crisis lasted 11 quarters and the recovery time was the same: seven quarters. This crisis, however, had a lower intensity, with an accumulated decrease in the GDP of 7.7%.

In turn, Brazil's GDP after the 2014 crisis was expected to reach the pre-crisis level in 2022, according to an optimistic estimate, with 20 quarters of recovery in total. When taking into account both GDP and the employment rate, the recovery from this economic crisis would be measured as taking longer. In addition to the sluggish recovery, the new jobs will likely be of lower quality, including informal and autonomous labor.

== See also ==
- List of economic crises in Brazil
- Brazil labor reform (2017)
- Economy of Brazil
- 2018 in Brazil
