= Murilo Ferreira (executive) =

Brazilian business executive

Murilo Ferreira is a Brazilian business executive, former CEO of Vale, a position he held from 2011 to 2017. He has been employed with the company since 1998. He was previously employed, and held the title of CEO at Alumínio Brasileiro and CVRD. He was educated at Escola de Administração de Empresas de São Paulo and Fundação Getúlio Vargas.
