= Ideation =

Ideation may refer to:

- Ideation (creative process), the creative process of generating, developing, and communicating new ideas
- Homicidal ideation, a common medical term for thoughts about homicide
- Suicidal ideation, the thought process of having ideas or ruminations about the possibility of dying by suicide

== See also ==
- Idea (disambiguation)
