= IDEAS =

IDEAS may stand for:

- I-DEAS (Integrated Design and Engineering Analysis Software), a computer-aided design software package
- IDEAS For Us, American environmental organization
- IDEAS Group, International Defence Enterprise Architecture Specification For Exchange group, developers of the IDEAS ontological foundation
- IDEAS UAV, a Chinese unmanned aerial vehicle
- Institute for Democracy and Economic Affairs, a Malaysian libertarian think tank
- International Defence Exhibition and Seminar, a defence sector event, held biennially, in Pakistan
- IDEAS, a database maintained by the Research Papers in Economics project
- IDEAS, International Development Evaluation Association, https://ideas-int.org

== See also ==
- Idea (disambiguation)
- Ideas (disambiguation)
