= Raimar Richers =

Brazil writer and academic (1926–2002)

Raimar Richers (born Zürich, July 31, 1926 – died São Paulo, June 18, 2002) was one of the founding professors at Escola de Administração de Empresas de São Paulo, business consultant and Brazilian amateur photographer. He was one of the first specialists in marketing in Brazil and wrote several books on that subject and others.

== Biography ==
Son of Gustave Pedro Wilhelm Richers and Anna Maria Schaumann Richers, both born in Brazil and descendants of German families, he was married to Anna Elisabeth Richers, Swiss, born in Solothurn, on July 31, 1923. He had two children: Cristiano (1958) and Betina (1959). He was the grandson of Henrique Schaumann and great-grandson of Gustav Stutzer. He was born in Zurich, Switzerland, during one of his mother's many trips to Europe, but spent his entire childhood and adolescence in São Paulo. Despite being born in that country and having married a Swiss citizen, he never had Swiss nationality (Switzerland follows the criterion of the "ius sanguinis" to grant nationality and Brazil the "ius solis"). He spent his first 20 years without nationality and, later, requested the Brazilian. He was a first cousin of Herbert Richers, film producer who brought the technology of dubbing to Brazil.

He studied economics at the University of Bern, where he obtained the title of Doctor in Economics with the distinction Summa Cum Laude in 1952. At the university he met his future wife, Anna Elisabeth Bläsi, who was studying Psychology there, having as one of her professors Jean Piaget.

After his return to Brazil, he worked at General Motors do Brasil as manager of the economic analysis department until 1956. That year he was selected to participate in the training of the first professors for the Escola de Administração de Empresas de São Paulo, at the Michigan State University, where he obtained the title of Master of Arts in business administration. Still in 1956, he began his career at EAESP/FGV as assistant professor. In 1957 he became associate professor, in 1974 full professor and in 1975 founding professor. During this period he also held the following positions at the school: coordinator of the graduate course in 1958, head of the center for research and publications from 1959 to 1963, coordinator of the intensive course for administrators from 1966 to 1968, head of the marketing department of 1970 to 1973. He created RAE and was its chief editor and director in charge from 1960 to 1965. He retired from FGV in 1982.

In 1973 he founded the company RR&CA – Raimar Richers e Consultores Associados, through which he acted as a consultant in more than 200 Brazilian companies until his death in 2002. He was a member of the boards of directors of the following companies: Bicicletas Caloi S.A. (São Paulo), Zivi-Hercules S.A. (Porto Alegre) and of Brasilinterpart Intermediações e Participações S.A. (São Paulo).

He died on June 18, 2002, at the age of 75, in the city of São Paulo.

== Main published books and monographs ==
- Sobre a Fundação do Café no Comércio Exterior do Brasil (tese de doutoramento, Linotipadora Gráfica Ltda., São Paulo, 1953, original in German).
- Análise de Títulos Particulares no Brasil e Ações Paulistas: Rendimento e Valorização (co-author, monographs, Bolsa Oficial de Valores de São Paulo, São Paulo, 1959 and 1960).
- Impacto da Ação do Governo sobre as Empresas Brasileiras (co-author, Fundação Getúlio Vargas, Rio de Janeiro, 1963).
- A Administração de Vendas nas Pequenas Empresas Brasileiras (co-author, Fundação Getúlio Vargas, Rio de Janeiro, 1967; 2nd edition 1970).
- Ensaios de Administração Mercadológica (Coordenador, Fundação Getúlio Vargas, Rio de Janeiro, 1972; 2nd edition 1977).
- Princípios da Administração Mercadológica (coautor, with 3 chapters, Fundação Getúlio Vargas, Rio de Janeiro, 1973).
- Rumos da América Latina – Desenvolvimento Econômico e Mudança Social (Editora Edgard Blücher, São Paulo, 1975).
- Seguro de Vida: Um Mercado a Conquistar (Associação das Cias. de Seguro no Estado de São Paulo, mimeographed, 1975).
- Segmentação como Alternativa Estratégica em Empresas Brasileiras (research report no. 1, EAESP/FGV, mimeographed, 1980)
- O Que é Marketing (Coleção Primeiros Passos, Editora Brasiliense, São Paulo, 1st edition 1981)
- O Que é Empresa (Coleção Primeiros Passos, Editora Brasiliense, São Paulo, 1986)
- O que é – Trabalho, Empresa e Marketing (co-author, Coleção Primeiros Passos, Editora Brasiliense, São Paulo, 1987)
- Segmentação – Opções Estratégicas para o Mercado Brasileiro (coordinator with Cecilia P. Lima, Editora Nobel, 1991)
- Surfando as ondas do mercado (RR&CA Editora, São Paulo, 1st edition 1996)
- Marketing: Uma Visão Brasileira (Editora Negócio, São Paulo, 1st edition 2000)

== Notable articles ==
- A Emancipação do Administrador Mercadológico (Revista de Administração de Empresas, vol.1, number 1, May/August 1961)
- O Empresário e a Inflação Brasileira (Revista de Administração de Empresas, vol.2, number 4, May/August 1962)
- Um Método Composto de Determinação de Preços (Revista de Administração de Empresas, vol.2, number 5, September/December 1962)
- Determinação de Zonas de Vendas: Um Modelo Brasileiro (Revista de Administração de Empresas, vol . 4, number 13, December 1964)
- Eine Strategie der Preisbestimmung für die Unternehmung (Management International Review, Wiesbaden, vol.6, number 3, 1966)
- Transformação Social pela Abertura de Novos Mercados (Revista de Administração de Empresas, vol. 8, number 27, June 1968)
- Desenvolvimento: Um Desafio Social (Revista de Administração de Empresas, vol. 1O, number 2, June 1970)
- Considerações Pouco Ortodoxas Sobre a Função do Consumo e Suas Implicações para os Países Menos Desenvolvidos (Revista de Administração de Empresas, vol. 11, number 2, June 1971)
- Educar — Para que? (Revista de Administração de Empresas, vol. 11, number 4, December 1971)
- Uma Futurologia Mercadológica para o Brasil (Mercados Porto Alegre, September/October 1977)
- Um Conceito Funcional de Integração Mercadológica (in: R. Richers (coord.), Ensaios de Administração Mercadológica FGV, Rio de Janeiro, 1972 and 1978)
- Dependência: Fatalidade ou Falácia do Desenvolvimento? (Revista de Administração de Empresas, vol.13, number 1, March 1973)
- A Mercadologia Internacional como Desafio e Ameaça para os Países em Desenvolvimento (Revista de Administração de Empresas, vol.14, number 2, April 1974)
- O Planejamento Familiar e o Mercado de Anticoncepcionais no Brasil (co-authored with Eduardo A. Buarque de Almeida, Revista de Administração de Empresas, vol. 15, number 4, July/August 1975
- Seguro de Vida: Um Mercado a Conquistar (Revista de Administração de Empresas, vol. 15, number 3, May/June 1975)
- A Latin American Marketing Profile and its Implications for Economic Development (in: World Marketing Series in Modern Marketing, Nr.5, Japan Productivity Center, Tokyo, 1975)
- Estratégias Mercadológicas de Empresas Multinacionais no Brasil (co-authored with William K. Brandt e James M. Hulbert‚ Revista de Administração de Empresas, vol. 6, number 4, July/August 1976)
- Marketing Brasil: Onde Estamos? Para Onde Vamos? (Mercado Global, Year 7, number 46, 1980)
- Marketing Planning in the Multinational Subsidiary: Practices and Problems (with James M. Hulbert and William K. Brandt, Journal of Marketing, vol. 44, number 3, version 1980)
- Objetivos como Razão de Ser da Empresa (Revista de Administração de Empresas, vol. 20, number 3, July/September 1980)
- Pitfalls in Planning for Multinational Operations (com William K. Brandt e James M. Hulbert, Long Range Planning, vol. 13, number 4, December 1980)
- Diversificar ou Não? Eis a Questão (Revista de Administração – FEA-USP, vol.16, number 2, April/June 1981)
- Livros-textos de Marketing: Um Confronto Crítico (Revista de Administração de Empresas, vol. 2l, number 2, April/June 1981)
- Estratégia, Estrutura e Ambiente (Revista de Administração de Empresas (USP), vol. 21, number 4, October/December 1981)
- A Sociedade Industrial e o Poder da Empresa Revista de Economia Política, vol. 2, number 4, October/December 1982)
- Elementos para uma Teoria de Decisões Estratégicas (Revista de Administração USP, vol. 17, number 4, October/December 1982)
- Como Enfrentar a Concorrência com Vantagem (Briefing, number 51, January/February 1984)
- Marketing e a Crise Econômica Brasileira (Tibiriçá, Ano XI, number 20, January/June 1984)
- O Enigmático, mas Indispensável Consumidor (Revista de Administração USP, vol. 19, number 3, July/September 1984)
- O Mercado Como Catalisador do Desenvolvimento (Revista de Administração de Empresas, vol. 26, number 3, July/September 1986)
- O Futuro do Marketing e o Marketing do Futuro (Revista de Administração USP, vol. 21, number 4, October/December 1986)
- Informação, Conhecimento e Sabedoria (Mercado Global, Ano XIV, number 70, January/April 1987)
- O despertar do Marketing Comunitário (Conjuntura Social, Ano II, March 2000)
- As extraordinárias perspectivas do Marketing (About, Ano XII, number 578, May 2000)
