= Fabio Alperowitch =

Brazilian entrepreneur

- Education: Fundação Getúlio Vargas (FGV/SP)
- Occupation: Entrepreneur
- Organization: fama re.capital

Fabio Alperowitch is a Brazilian entrepreneur and founder of FAMA Investimentos.

== Education ==
Alperowitch holds bachelor's degree in business from Fundação Getúlio Vargas (FGV/SP).

== Career ==
Alperowitch began his career as an intern at Procter & Gamble - Brazil, and at the age of 21 when he was in the final year of college he founded FAMA Investimentos, an asset management company focused on equity investments in Brazil. The company has always been focused on investing in Brazilian companies listed on the stock exchange, standards and socio-environmental responsibility. He is a board member of WWF Brazil, GRI Brazil, Capitalismo Consciente Brazil (Conscious Capitalism), Intituto Totós da Teté, Pacto pela Equidade Racial (Racial Equality Pact), LIFE Institute, Museu Judaico de São Paulo (Jewish Museum of São Paulo), Instituto FAMA, Instituto Brasil Israel.

He has two children, Felipe and Alan Alperowitch.

== Publication ==
"The World's 99 Greatest Investor" Magnus Angefelt, 2014 Listed Among the most successful investors in the world.
