= João Meirelles Filho =

Brazilian writer

- Born: João Meirelles Filho; Brazil
- Occupations: social entrepreneur, writer

João Carlos de Souza Meirelles Filho (São Paulo, Brazil, March 7, 1960) is a Brazilian writer and a social entrepreneur, considered to be a reference in studies on the Amazon Basin.

As a social entrepreneur, he is the general director of Instituto Peabiru, a Brazilian NGO whose mission is "to facilitate processes to strengthen social organization and the valorization of socio-biodiversity so that the extractive populations and family farmers of the Amazon can be protagonists of their reality". He has overseen partnership building and fundraising for Instituto Peabiru since the organization’s foundation in 1998.

Meirelles is an active environmentalist with over 32 years of experience defending the Amazon. Among major themes he is dedicated to are traditional knowledge associated to family agriculture, pollination, human rights and land grabbing on traditional land, and the impacts of meat & dairy production on food security.

For 6 years, he has served as the vice president and director of the Fundação SOS Mata Atlântica, directing a major environmental campaign in Brazil called “We are taking the green out of our land”. From 1998 to 2002 he has served as the director of the Institute of Ecotourism in Brazil. From 1999 to 2012 Meirelles was supported by Avina Foundation as a “Leader-Partner” in social entrepreneurship for four projects on behalf of Instituto Peabiru.

He has served in a number of advisory roles as a consultant for companies and public organizations. Meirelles is the author of articles in the press and the author of 18 books that sold more than 150 thousand copies including Private Natural Heritage in Brazil (Metalivros, 2016) and Rios do Brasil (Rivers of Brazil)(Metalivros, 2016).

He holds a degree in business administration from Fundação Getulio Vargas in São Paulo. He has won twice Amazon region’s most prestigious prize, Prêmio Samuel Benchimol Banco da Amazônia (2012 and 2013).
