= FGV Management =

Brazilian education foundation

The FGV Management is a Brazilian private institution established in 2003 to develop and manage a single distribution network at the domestic at international levels for the Continued Education programs developed by the various Fundação Getúlio Vargas.

Created in 1999, and initially the fruit of a partnership between EBAPE and EPGE, FGV Management's objective is to distribute and manage broad graduate courses, including MBAs and short-run curses (Cademp).

FGV Management has a Partners Network made up of more than 30 institutions in over 80 cities. These institutions are responsible for tasks including program marketing, logistics and execution, while the contents, faculty and academic coordination are FGV's exclusive responsibility.

The FGV Management Network is made up of own center and associate institutes distributed strategically across Brazil. Its structure comprehends five superintendences (Rio de Janeiro, Brasília, São Paulo and two regional areas for the rest of Brazil) and by associate institutes ISAE Paraná, ISAE Manaus and ISAE Maranhão.

It maintains international partnerships with universities in Europe − ISCTE (Lisbon), IMD (Lausanne, Switzerland) − and the United States − Ohio University, University of California, The University of Tampa, Columbia Business School and The University of Chicago −, where students can take part in short- and medium-term programs. International programs are available to all IDE students.

FGV Management has graduate and short-term programs that attempt to meet the needs of five different professional segments:

- FGV CEO Internacional, in partnership with the Columbia University and IMD (for presidents, vice presidents, directors and superintendents);
- MBA Programs (for directors, managers and professionals);
- Graduate degree in Business Administration (for recent graduates and trainees);
- Graduate degree in Private Law and Enterprise (for legal practitioners interested in putting into practice the knowledge gained in Law School);
- Cademp Programs.
