= Idea (disambiguation) =

An idea is an image existing or formed in the mind.

Idea or IDEA or similar may also refer to:

== Computing and software ==
- International Data Encryption Algorithm, a block cipher
- IntelliJ IDEA, a development application for the Java programming language
- IdeaPad, a line of consumer-oriented laptop computers from Lenovo

== Government organizations ==
- International Institute for Democracy and Electoral Assistance, an international intergovernmental organization
- Local Government Improvement and Development, a United Kingdom local government organization previously known as the Improvement and Development Agency (IDEA)

== Politics ==
- Diversity, equity, inclusion and access
- Idea (political party), a political party in Slovakia
- Identity and Action (IDEA), a political party in Italy
- Ieros Desmos Ellinon Axiomatikon (ΙΔΕΑ, Sacred Bond of Greek Officers), a right-wing group of officers in the Greek army in the 1940s–1960s whose members led the Greek military junta of 1967–74
- Megali Idea, an irredentist concept of Greek nationalism
- Szeged Idea, refers to the proto-fascist ideology that developed among anti-communist counter-revolutionaries in Szeged, Hungary in 1919

== Law ==
- IDEA (journal), a law review published by an independent student organization at the Franklin Pierce Center for Intellectual Property at the University of New Hampshire School of Law
- Individuals with Disabilities Education Act, a U.S. federal law on the education of primary school students with disabilities
- Wisconsin Idea, the policy developed in the U.S. state of Wisconsin that fosters public universities' contributions to the state

== Music ==
- Idea in music may refer to a concept implemented musically, shortest forms of musical ideas are Motif (music) and Figure (music)
- Idea (album), by the Bee Gees
- Idea (TV special), about the Bee Gees
- Idea Records, a record label
- The Idea (musical), an 1893 Broadway musical

== Automotive and industrial design ==
- Fiat Idea, a compact car
- International Design Excellence Awards, an award program
- I.DE.A Institute, an automobile design and engineering company
- IDEA, a high-mileage plug-in hybrid electric van produced by Bright Automotive

== Other organizations ==
- IDEA League, a loose alliance of five European universities
- Idea (news agency), an evangelical news agency in Germany
- Institute for Dynamic Educational Advancement, an organization promoting computer-based learning
- Intelligent Design and Evolution Awareness Center, a Christian nonprofit organization formed as a student club to promote the pseudoscientific principle of intelligent design at the University of California, San Diego (UCSD)
- Idea Cellular, a wireless telephony company in India
- International Deaf Education Association (IDEA), an organization focused on the program of educating the deaf in Bohol, Philippines initiated by the United States Peace Corps
- Idea (supermarkets), a retail chain in Serbia
- IDEA Public Schools, a Texas non-profit organization of tuition-free K-12 charter schools
- International Development Ethics Association, an association formerly led by David Crocker
- IDEA (bookstore), a bookstore in the Soho district of London

== Other meanings ==
- Idea (classical element)
- Idea (genus), a genus of butterflies

== See also ==
- Ideas (disambiguation)
- IDEAS (disambiguation)
- Eyedea (1981–2010), a rapper and part of the hip-hop duo Eyedea & Abilities
- General Idea, a collective of three Canadian artists active from 1967 to 1994
- Idea Vilariño (1920–2009), a Uruguayan poet, essayist and literary critic
- Idea Zee Cinestars, a popular talent-hunt reality show on Zee TV channel in 2006
- New Idea, an Australian weekly magazine
- "Wrong Idea", a 2001 song by Americans rappers Bad Azz and Snoop Dogg featuring Kokane, and Lil' ½ Dead
