= IDEAS For Us =

Non-governmental organization

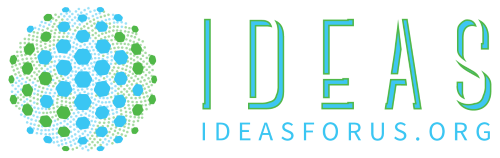
- Formation: 2008; 18 years ago
- Type: Nonprofit
- Tax ID no.: 27-3999166
- Legal status: 501(c)(3)
- Headquarters: Orlando, Florida, United States
- Founders: Henry Harding and Chris Castro
- Website: https://ideasforus.org/

IDEAS For Us is a United Nations–accredited non-governmental organization which works to advance sustainability through local action projects in countries and on campuses around the world. IDEAS For Us focuses on reaching communities furthest from sustainable development and advancing the global goals for sustainable development by helping to develop, fund, and scale local action projects from within communities which have the potential to grow into ongoing programs. IDEAS For Us has three major programs: Fleet Farming (an urban agricultural program), the Hive (a community think/do tank), and the Solutions Fund (an international micro-granting philanthropic branch which supports projects related to the 17 Global Goals).

== Goals ==
Since their inception, IDEAS For Us has evolved into an international network of thousands of individuals who work together to identify, share, develop and initiate these solutions to the integrated environment and sustainability challenges with a focus on the 5 Pillars of Sustainability: Energy, Water, Food, Waste and Ecology. The movement uses an all inclusive approach to directly involve students in multiple disciplines to organize community actions, share resources and best practices, develop innovations, and invent the solutions they need through cooperation.

== Mission ==
IDEAS For Us seeks to "Educate, Engage, and Empower" youth and all ages on environmental issues. The organization seeks to provide means for groups of individuals to make a positive change in their environmental community. IDEAS chapters are encouraged "not to dilute, but to add value" to the existing environmental community.

Mission Statement of IDEAS For Us, taken from the organization's website:

IDEAS FOR US is a 501(c)(3) non-profit organization, and accredited NGO by the United Nations, advancing sustainability and environmental awareness through youth-led action.

Mission Statement of the IDEAS Movement, taken from the organization's website:

"To Educate, Engage, and Empower people of all ages in Sustainability through a database of resources, initiatives and experiential learning activities to create positive environmental change on campus and in their community."

== IDEAS Movement ==
=== Origins ===
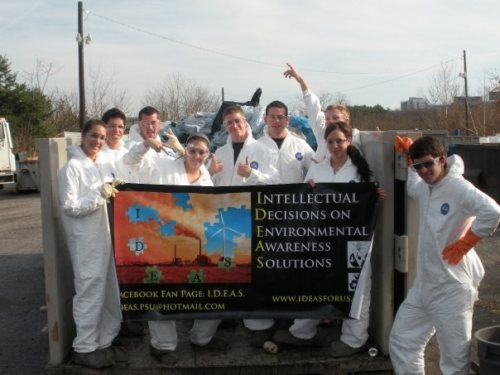
Penn State University Chapter during the Green Your Game recycling initiative

The first chapter of I.D.E.A.S. (Intellectual Decisions on Environmental Awareness Solutions) was created at the University of Central Florida in August 2008 by Chris Castro and Henry Harding, both UCF students at the time. Shortly after, a second chapter was created at the University of Miami. Chapters at both schools worked together to participate in the Kill-a-Watt challenge, proving to be the first project which gained acclaim in school newspapers for the movement. From there, the UCF chapter created the "T-tote" campaign, which involved upcycling worn out donated T-shirts into carrying bags. This campaign moved IDEAS on the national level for winning the "Best Campaign of the Year" award at the 2010 Campus Progress National Conference. The movement gained further attention when a video with Chris Castro, founder to the movement, appeared on the front page of the United States Department of Energy's website in 2010.

By 2011 the vision to transform the organization into a 501 (c)(3) Non-Profit Organization was pursued and with the help of the current executive director, Clayton Louis Ferrara, I.D.E.A.S. transformed into IDEAS For Us.

=== Activities ===
On October 31, 2011, a house which functions completely off-the-grid was established by IDEAS members in downtown Orlando, Florida. This house has no basic utilities, such as municipal water or electric. Instead the house is completely powered by solar panels and wind turbines. Water is provided by runoff barrels. The house was designed and implemented entilerly by a team of IDEAS eco engineers.

DJ Chill Will, a Floridian IDEAS member, is a DJ who runs all of his equipment on solar power.

As of Fall 2012, IDEAS for Binghamton and IDEAS Office of the Northern Region are collaborating on a project which will bring a semi-closed loop food system to the Binghamton University campus, by creating an on-campus farm as well as an on-campus compost system.

Through Clean Edison, IDEASforUs offers courses in the U.S. Green Building Council’s LEED (Leadership in Energy and Environmental Design), BPI (Building Performance Institute) Certification, Energy Auditing, Solar Installation, Wind Engineer and Renewable Energy Technician.

TEDx Orlando featured a seminar about the application of biomimicry to the environmental movement, given by Chris Castro.

On February 6, 2013, IDEAS launched The Hive, a think tank at Urban ReThink in Orlando, Florida. The Hive is an initiative meant to mobilize activists invested in community sustainability.

IDEAS was represented at the February 17, l 2013 Forward On Climate rally in Washington, D.C. Before the rally, IDEAS for Binghamton and fellow New York residents met to protest hydraulic fracturing in New York's Southern Tier.

=== Chapters ===
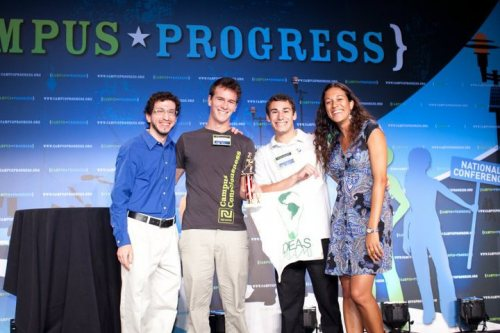
IDEAS for Us accepts the Best Campaign of the Year Award from Campus Progress

- University of Central Florida
- University of Florida
- Florida International University
- University of Miami
- Miami-Dade College
- Seminole State College
- Penn State University
- Florida State University
- Florida A&M University
- Full Sail University
- Coral Reef High School
- Binghamton University
- Rollins College
- Eau Gallie High School
- Chapel Hill High School
- University of Michigan
- Howard University
- Uganda
- Chitwan Medical College
- Kathmandu University
- Pokhara University
- Pashchimanchal Campus
- Janapriya Multiple Campus
- Institute of Engineering

=== Awards ===
Best Campaign of the Year 2009-2010 - Campus Progress

2011 Conservation Organization of the Year (2011) - Florida Wildlife Federation

Champions of Change (2011) - The White House Office of Public Engagement
