= FGV Brasília =

FGV Brasília is a Brazilian private higher education institution established in 1978 and linked to the Fundação Getúlio Vargas. It is the only institution of FGV located outside the Rio de Janeiro-São Paulo axis. The FGV Center in Brasília develops strict graduate programs in various areas of knowledge. It also designs and develops in-company corporate education programs.
