= St. Ides (disambiguation) =

St. Ides is an American brand of malt liquor.

St. Ides may also refer to:

- Íte of Killeedy, also known as St. Ides
- "St. Ides", a song by L.A.P.D. from Who's Laughing Now
- "St. Ides", a song by Macklemore & Ryan Lewis from This Unruly Mess I've Made
- St. Ides EP, an extended play by 213

== See also ==
- Ides
- St Ives
