= Bids for the 2007 Pan American Games =

Bids for the 2007 Pan and Parapan American Games
Overview
- XV Pan American Games; III Parapan American Games
- Winner: Rio de Janeiro; Runner-up: San Antonio

Details
- Committee: PASO
- Election venue: Mexico City, Mexico; 40th PASO General Assembly

Map
- Location of the bidding cities

Important dates
- Decision: August 24, 2002

Decision
- Winner: Rio de Janeiro (30 votes)
- Runner-up: San Antonio (21 votes)

Two cities submitted bids to host the 2007 Pan American Games that were recognized by the Pan American Sports Organization. PASO selected Rio de Janeiro, Brazil over San Antonio, United States as the host for 15th Pan American Games on August 24, 2002, at its general assembly held in Mexico City, Mexico by a vote of 30 to 21.

== Host city selection ==
2007 Pan American Games bidding results
City	NOC	Round 1
Rio de Janeiro	Brazil	30
San Antonio	United States	21

== Candidate cities ==
=== Rio de Janeiro, Brazil ===
As early as 1999, Rio de Janeiro decided to bid for the 2007 Pan American Games over the 2008 Summer Olympics. Rio de Janeiro representatives cited that their beaches were superior to the San Antonio River Walk, their conditions for the games were better, and that hosting the games would mean more to Brazil than the United States. Additionally, Brazil on in a emergential basis, agreed to host the 2002 South American Games in four cities, including Rio de Janeiro, after the games had to be relocated away from its initial host Medellín, Colombia, due to city violence concerns, with just three months of planning. Rio also took advantage of the world climate post the September 11 attacks in the United States, touting that they were a terrorism-free city.

=== San Antonio, United States ===
On October 16, 1999, San Antonio was selected over Houston, Raleigh-Durham, and Miami to be the running host city for the 2007 Pan American Games by the United States Olympic Committee. In many circles, San Antonio was the clear front-runner to hold the games. Financially, $4.6 million of the $5.5 million the city promised for the games was already in the bank, and the city promised free airfare, hotel rooms, food, and long-distance calls for all of the athletes and delegates. Additionally, the bid noted that the city had every venue already built, sans a main track and field stadium and a velodrome.

Much to many peoples surprise, San Antonio did not win the host rights. San Antonio's bid committee members were "reeling in disbelief," due to the fact that San Antonio had hosted numerous multi-sport international games and had been trying to hold the Pan American Games for 15 years. Some sources claim that the city's chances of winning were hampered by the political relationship between the USOC and PASO.

== Canceled bid ==
- Guadalajara, Mexico

Guadalajara officially entered the bidding process on August 17, 2001 at the PASO general assembly meetings in Santo Domingo, Dominican Republic. However, the city decided to withdraw early due to the discouraging outlook.
