= Revista de Administração de Empresas =

Brazilian scientific journal on Business Management launched in 1961

- Discipline: Business
- Language: English, Portuguese, Spanish
- Edited by: Juliana Bonomi Santos

Publication details
- History: 1961–present
- Publisher: Escola de Administração de Empresas de São Paulo (Brazil)
- Frequency: Continuous
- Open access: Yes
- License: CC BY
- Impact factor: 0.7 (2022)

Standard abbreviations
- ISO 4: Rev. Adm. Empresas

Indexing
- ISSN: 0034-7590 (print); 2178-938X (web)

Links
- Journal homepage; Online access; Online archive

Revista de Administração de Empresas (RAE) is a Brazilian peer-reviewed, open-access academic journal covering the fields of business administration and management. Established in 1961, it is published by the Escola de Administração de Empresas de São Paulo (FGV EAESP). As of May 1st 2024, its editor-in-chief is Juliana Bonomi Santos.

== History ==
The first issue contained contributions by foreign authors, several linked to the Michigan State University, an institution that participated in the foundation and development of the Escola de Administração de Empresas de São Paulo. The first editor was Raimar Richers (Escola de Administração de Empresas de São Paulo).

== Editors ==
According to the journal's official historical records, the editorial leadership of the Revista de Administração de Empresas has included the following individuals since its establishment in 1961:

Editor	Period
Juliana Bonomi Santos	Since 1 May 2024
Jorge Carneiro	June 2021 – April 2024
Maria José Tonelli	January 2016 – May 2021
Eduardo Henrique Diniz	February 2009 – December 2015
Flávio Carvalho de Vasconcelos	October 2008 – January 2009
Francisco Aranha	August 2007 – September 2008
Carlos Osmar Bertero	January 2005 – August 2007
Thomaz Wood Jr.	January 2001 – December 2004
Roberto Venosa	December 1995 – December 2000
Marilson Alves Gonçalves	October 1991 – November 1995
Gisela Black Taschner	January 1986 – September 1991
Maria Rita G. Loureiro Durand	October 1989 – December 1989
Maria Cecília Spina Forjaz	October 1985 – September 1989
Arakcy Martins Rodrigues	January 1984 – December 1985
Sérgio Micelli Pessoa de Barros	January 1984 – September 1985
Dennis Cintra Leite	July 1982 – December 1983
Yoshiaki Nakano	April 1982 – December 1983
Alkimar Ribeiro Moura	April 1980 – June 1982
Sérgio Micelli Pessoa de Barros	April 1980 – March 1982
Luiz Antonio de Oliveira Lima	July 1975 – March 1980
Gerald Dinu Reiss	April 1978 – March 1980
Paulo Clarindo Goldschmidt	January 1975 – March 1978
Sérgio Micelli Pessoa de Barros	January 1973 – December 1974
Robert N. V. C. Nicol	October 1970 – June 1975
Manoel Tosta Berlinck	July 1971 – December 1972
Orlando Figueiredo	April 1969 – June 1971
Eduardo Matarazzo Suplicy	September 1969 – September 1970
Esdras Borges Costa	October 1968 – August 1969
Ary Bouzan	July 1968 – March 1969
Carlos Osmar Bertero	January 1967 – June 1968
Yolanda F. Balcão	July 1965 – December 1966
Raimar Richers	May 1961 – June 1965
