= Rio de Janeiro bid for the 2007 Pan American Games =

Bids for the 2007 Pan and Parapan American Games
Overview
- XV Pan American Games; III Parapan American Games
- Winner: Rio de Janeiro; Runner-up: San Antonio

Details
- City: Rio de Janeiro, Brazil
- Chair: Paulo Wanderley Teixeira
- NOC: Brazilian Olympic Committee

Previous Games hosted
- None

Decision
- Result: Defeated San Antonio, 30-21

The Rio de Janeiro bid for the 2007 Pan American Games was a successful campaign, first recognised by the Pan American Sports Organization (PASO) in August 2001. Rio de Janeiro began working on the idea of staging the 2007 Pan American Games during the 1999 Pan American Games held in Winnipeg, Canada. There was a strong desire among sportspersons and officials at that time to work so that the best of national sport could be showcased at home, in a large event using state-of-the-art fields-of-play. Based on this strategic vision, the Brazilian Olympic Committee (BOC) General Assembly decided in December 1999 that Brazil would not bid to host the 2008 Summer Olympics and would instead focus its efforts on the bid for the 2007 Pan American Games. The important results obtained by the Brazilian delegation at the Winnipeg Games and the wide publicity for the event in Brazil encouraged sports authorities to definitely support the Rio de Janeiro bid to host the 2007 Pan American Games.

== Details ==
The official bid was submitted in August 2001 during the XXXIX Pan American Sports Organization (PASO) General Assembly held in Santo Domingo, Dominican Republic. In April 2002, following delivery of Federal, State and City Government and BOC letters confirming country, state, city and Brazilian sport compliance with the applicable Games regulations, PASO announced the approval of Rio de Janeiro's bid. The Bidding Committee then submitted a detailed bid file for the Games. The document was prepared and developed with the assistance of Fundação Getúlio Vargas (FGV), which had been commissioned by Rio de Janeiro's City Government. In the running to host the 2007 Pan American Games, Rio de Janeiro faced off with the city of San Antonio, United States; which previously beat Houston, Miami, and Raleigh to become the American candidate.

Rio de Janeiro had in favour a compact bid plan, able to stage all of the competitions within city limits by capitalizing on its outstanding natural characteristics, which were conducive to building competition venues that were located close to each other and welcoming athletes in one Pan American Village. Rio de Janeiro got another boost from succeeding in preparing to host the 2002 South American Games, with competitions held in four different capital cities—Curitiba, Belém, Rio de Janeiro, and São Paulo—in as little as three months in advance. The Games were originally scheduled to be held in Medellín, Colombia, but intervening problems affecting that country forced the South American Sports Organization (ODESUR), to choose between canceling Games or moving them to Brazil, which took up the challenge to host and organize the event in record time.

According to PASO statute and regulations, the host city was selected by direct voting during the XL PASO General Assembly held in Mexico City, Mexico, on August 24, 2002. The candidate city that received the simple majority of votes from representatives of the 42 member National Olympic Committees (NOCs) would be awarded the right to host the competition. The announcement was made by PASO President Mario Vázquez Raña. Rio de Janeiro received 30 votes against 21 from San Antonio. Marked by a professional strategy that included the showing of city and project videos, Rio de Janeiro's campaign convinced the majority of voters, accounting for a total 51 votes. The 30-member Brazilian delegation erupted into boisterous celebration celebrating the country's highest achievement in terms of sporting event organization until then, before the winning bid for the 2016 Summer Olympics.
