= Escola de Direito de São Paulo =

Brazilian law institution

The FGV Direito SP or Escola de Direito de São Paulo da Fundação Getulio Vargas (São Paulo Law School of Fundação Getulio Vargas) is a Brazilian private law higher education institution founded on July 1, 2002, in São Paulo by the Fundação Getulio Vargas.

At that time, the school already provided at least twenty courses through the GVlaw program, which preceded the creation of Direito GV. Conceived in 2000 as a branch of the São Paulo Business School (EAESP) continued education programs and, later, in 2002, as a Direito GV learning initiative, GVlaw is now a reference for lato-sensu graduate legal studies, dedicated to the creation, development and organization of specialization, continued education and corporate courses.
