= Ideas (disambiguation) =

Ideas usually refer to a person's thoughts or a developed concepts.

Ideas may also refer to:

- I-DEAS, the CAx software
- Ideas: General Introduction to Pure Phenomenology, a 1913 book by Edmund Husserl
- Ideas (radio show), a Canadian radio program
- Ideas (retailer), a Pakistani retail chain
- Institute for Democracy and Economic Affairs, or IDEAS, a Malaysian think tank
- International Defence Exhibition and Seminar, a major biennial defence event based in Pakistan
- LSE IDEAS, an international affairs research centre at the London School of Economics
- Theory of forms, or theory of ideas, a theory of abstract entities created by Plato, referred to as Ideas or Forms

== See also ==
- Idea (disambiguation)
- IDEAS (disambiguation)
- Ideas Festival (disambiguation)
- Ideen (disambiguation)
