= Lutz Wingert =

German philosopher (born 1958)

- Born: 1958 (age 67–68); Stuttgart, West Germany
- Occupation: Philosopher

Lutz Wingert (German: [ˈvɪŋɐt]; born 1958) is a German philosopher who is sometimes identified as one of the "Third Generation" of the Frankfurt School of philosophy.

He is a professor of philosophy focusing on practical philosophy at the Swiss Federal Institute of Technology Zurich and a member of the Zentrum Geschichte des Wissens (Centre for the History of Knowledge). He is a former student of, and a co-author with, Jürgen Habermas, a founding member of the Frankfurt School. Wingert is a former chair of practical philosophy at the University of Dortmund. Along with Wilfried Hinsch, he edits the Ideen & Argumente philosophical book series.

In 1998, he was awarded the Karl Jaspers Prize. In 2009 he helped chair a Habermas conference in Pécs, Hungary. In March 2011, he co-chaired the Rhetorics and Therapy conference.

== Bibliography ==
=== Books ===
- Wingert, Lutz (1993). Gemeinsinn und Moral: Grundzüge einer intersubjektivistischen Moralkonzeption [Common sense and morality: basic features of an intersubjective conception of morality] (in German). Frankfurt am Main: Suhrkamp Verlag. ISBN 978-3-518-58157-5. OCLC 31616839. Revision of the author's thesis, Frankfurt am Main, 1990-1991
- Wingert, Lutz; Habermas, Jürgen (2001). Epistemisch nützliche Konfrontationen mit der Welt [Epistemically useful confrontations with the world] (in German). Frankfurt am Main: Suhrkamp Verlag. OCLC 248840004.
- Wingert, Lutz; Habermas, Jürgen (2001). Die Öffentlichkeit der Vernunft und die Vernunft der Öffentlichkeit: Festschrift für Jürgen Habermas [The public sphere of reason and common sense to the public: Festschrift for Jurgen Habermas]. Suhrkamp-Taschenbuch Wissenschaft (in German). Frankfurt am Main: Suhrkamp Verlag. ISBN 978-3-518-29133-7. OCLC 237472213.
- Wingert, Lutz (2003). Mit realistischem Sinn: zur Erklärung empirischer Rechtfertigung [With a realistic sense for the explanation of empirical justification]. Suhrkamp-Taschenbuch Wissenschaft (in German). Frankfurt am Main: Suhrkamp Verlag. ISBN 978-3-518-29221-1. OCLC 249311773.
- Vogel, Matthias; Wingert, Lutz (2003). Wissen zwischen Entdeckung und Konstruktion: erkenntnistheoretische Kontroversen [Knowledge between discovery and design: epistemological controversy]. Suhrkamp-Taschenbuch Wissenschaft (in German). Frankfurt am Main: Suhrkamp Verlag. ISBN 978-3-518-29191-7. OCLC 464387980.

=== Series editor ===
- Hinsch, Wilfried; Wingert, Lutz (eds.). Ideen & Argumente (in German). Berlin: Walter de Gruyter GmbH & Co. KG. ISSN 1862-1147. OCLC 73592674.

=== Articles in journals ===
- Wingert, Lutz (1995). "Unter nicht-transzendenten Prämissen begründen und sich fragen, was mit der Moral sonst noch verlorenginge" [To Found on No-Transcendent Premises and to Ask Oneself, what Still More Will Be Lost with Morals]. Philosophische Rundschau (in German). 42 (4). Tübingen: J.C.B. Mohr: 286–296. ISSN 0031-8159. OCLC 1465678.
- Wingert, Lutz (1997). "Gott naturalisieren: Anscombes Problem und Tugendhats Lösung" [Naturalizing God? Anscombe's problem and Tugendhat's solution]. Deutsche Zeitschrift für Philosophie (in German). 45 (4). Berlin: Akademie Verlag: 501–528. doi:10.1524/dzph.1997.45.4.501. ISSN 0012-1045. OCLC 185043316. S2CID 171322652.
- Wingert, Lutz (2000). "Genealogie der Objektivitat. Zu Robert B. Brandoms, expressiver Vernunft" [Genealogy of objectivity. On Robert B. Brandoms, expressive reason]. Deutsche Zeitschrift für Philosophie (in German). 48 (5). Berlin: Akademie Verlag: 738–761. doi:10.1524/dzph.2000.48.5.738. ISSN 0012-1045. OCLC 185043316. S2CID 171757628.*Wingert, Lutz (2007). "Lebensweltliche Gewissheit versus wissenschaftliches Wissen?" [Everyday assurance versus scientific knowledge?]. Deutsche Zeitschrift für Philosophie (in German). 55 (6). Berlin: Akademie Verlag: 911. doi:10.1524/dzph.2007.55.6.911. ISSN 0012-1045. OCLC 185043316. S2CID 170945328.
- Wingert, Lutz (March 2011). "Die elementaren Strukturen der menschlichen Sozialität" [The basic structures of human sociality]. Deutsche Zeitschrift für Philosophie (in German). 59 (1). Berlin: Akademie Verlag: 158–163. doi:10.1524/dzph.2011.0013. ISSN 0012-1045. OCLC 185043316. S2CID 170466573.

=== Articles in newspapers ===
- Wingert, Lutz (2007). "WISSEN - Philosophie - Biologie allein kann den Geist nicht erklaren - eine Erwiderung" [KNOWLEDGE - Philosophy - Biology alone can not explain the mind - a response]. Die Zeit (in German). 62 (36). Hamburg: Zeit-Verlag Gerd Bucerius: 34. ISSN 0044-2070. OCLC 169829194.
- Wingert, Lutz (2010). "Armutsdebatte - Die unheilige Allianz der neuen Leistungsträger" [Poverty Debate - The unholy alliance of the new Leistungsträger]. Die Zeit (in German). 65 (3). Hamburg: Zeit-Verlag Gerd Bucerius: 40. ISSN 0044-2070. OCLC 169829194.
