= IDE =

IDE, ide, or Ide may refer to:

== Organizations ==
- Institut für Dokumentologie und Editorik, a German think tank for the application of digital methods on historical documents
- Institute of Developing Economies, a semi-governmental research institute in Japan
- Institute for Democratic Education, founded by Yaacov Hecht
- Instituto de Desenvolvimento Educacional, a Brazilian institution linked with Fundação Getúlio Vargas
- International Development Enterprises, a U.S.-based nonprofit organization
- Party of Internet Democracy, a political party in Hungary

== Science and technology ==
=== Biology and medicine ===
- Ide (fish), a freshwater fish
- Intact dilation and extraction, a form of abortion
- Insulin-degrading enzyme, an enzyme encoded by the gene IDE
- Infectious disease epidemiology, the study of the patterns of communicable diseases at the population level
- Investigational Device Exemption, a U.S. Food and Drug Administration regulatory status

=== Chemistry ===
- -ide, a suffix for some molecules in the IUPAC nomenclature of inorganic chemistry

=== Computing ===
- Integrated development environment, a software application used to develop software
- Integrated Drive Electronics, a computer hardware bus for disk drives, retroactively termed Parallel ATA

== Places ==
- Ide, Devon, a village in England
- Ide, Kyoto, a town in Japan

== Greek mythology ==
- Ida (mother of Minos), the daughter of Corybas, the wife of Lycastus king of Crete, and the mother of the "second" king Minos of Crete
- Ida (nurse of Zeus), who along with her sister Adrasteia nursed Zeus on Crete

== Abbreviations ==
- IDE, sometimes used to refer to diversity, equity, and inclusion, an organizational equality training term

== People ==
- Samuel Krafsur (1913–1983), an American journalist (KGB code: IDE)
- Ide Schelling (born 1998), a Dutch cyclist

=== Given name ===
- Íde, a feminine name of Gaelic origin

=== Surname ===
- William B. Ide (1796–1852), the author of the California Republic's proclamation of independence from Mexico
- Henry Clay Ide (1844–1921), an American commissioner to Samoa and the Philippines
- Bob Ide, an American politician
- Charlie Ide (born 1988), an English footballer
- Haruya Ide (井出 遥也; born 1994), a Japanese footballer
- Junpei Ide (井出 隼平; born 1991), a Japanese shogi player
- Juri Ide (井出 樹里; born 1983), a Japanese triathlete
- Kaname Ide (井出 かなめ; born 1947), a Japanese speed skater
- Ide Kaoru (井手 薰; 1879–1944), a Japanese architect
- Toshirō Ide (井手 俊郎; 1910–1988), a Japanese screenwriter
- Yasunori Ide (井出 安軌), a Japanese anime creator
- Yuji Ide (井出 有治; born 1975), a Japanese racing driver

== Other uses ==
- Idere language (ISO 639-3 code: ide)

== See also ==
- Eid (disambiguation)
- Ides (disambiguation)
