= Janapriya Multiple Campus =

College in Nepal

- जनप्रिय बहुमुखि क्याम्पस

Location
- Pokhara, Gandaki Province; Nepal; 28.2033°N 83.9784°E

Information
- Other names: JMC
- Motto: Quality Education University Experience
- Established: 1991 (2048 BS)
- Status: Open
- Language: English, Nepalese
- Affiliations: Tribhuwan University
- Website: janapriya.edu.np

Janapriya Multiple Campus (JMC) is a multi-disciplinary institute affiliated to the Tribhuwan University. The campus was established in 1991 as a non-profit academic institution at Pokhara, Nepal to develop skilled human resources. The campus has been QAA certified by the University Grants Commission (Nepal). As of 2019, the campus had 4550 students. The campus publishes its academic journal annually titled Janapriya Journal of Interdisciplinary Studies.

== History ==
On 8 March 2005, students of the All Nepal National Independent Students' Union (Revolutionary) assaulted the principal of the college, Ganesh Man Palikhe, in his office, dousing him with gasoline and attempting to burn him alive. He fought back and survived. The district administration arranged two police officers as bodyguards, but on 12 June he and his bodyguards were assassinated by Maoist gunmen.

On 14 December 2008, students affiliated with communist parties CPN-Maoist and CPN-UML forcibly detained Campus Chief Sabita Baidya and vandalized her office, burning furniture and documents. She resigned after the attack.

== Courses ==
- Master of Business Administration (MBA)
- Master of Business Studies (MBS)
- BSc in Microbiology
- Bachelor of Mountain Tourism Management (BMTM)
- BBA (Bachelor of Business Administration (BBA)
- BIM (Bachelor of Information Management)
- Bachelor of Business studies (BBS)
- Bachelor of Arts (BA)
- Bachelor of Education (BEd)
- 10+2 in Management, Education, Humanities and Science.

== See also ==
- Prithivi Narayan Campus
