= IDEA (bookstore) =

Bookshop in London

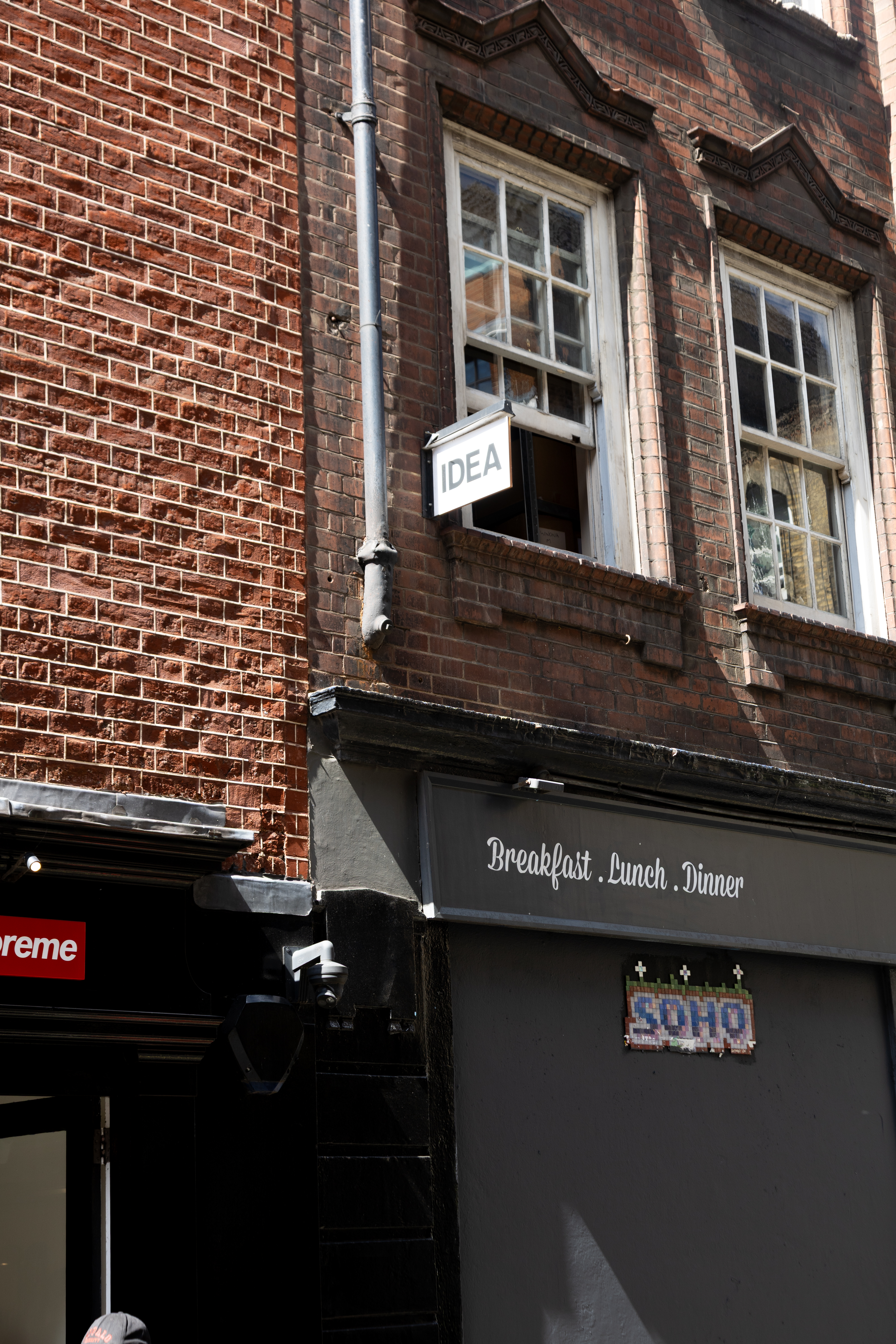
- The sign for IDEA in Soho in 2025
- Interactive map of the IDEA area

General information
- Location: 101 Wardour Street, London W1F 0UG, United Kingdom
- Coordinates: 51.51308426449794°N 0.13379263840977954°W
- Opened: 2024

IDEA is a bookstore in the Soho district of London specializing in rare, vintage books and magazines, among other kinds of titles. It was founded by David Owen and Angela Hill. Originally selling through Colette in the nineties and, later, various Dover Street Market locations, Owen and Hill gained popular traction on Instagram in the 2010s and also pivoted to book publishing in collaboration with various high fashion houses like Vetements.

In 2024, IDEA officially opened its permanent location in the Soho building where Owen and Hill have operated it for decades. The same year, Vogue called it the coolest bookshop in the world since 2011.

== History ==
IDEA founders David Owen and Angela Hill began collecting rare, vintage titles in the nineties and selling them through Paris' Colette and, later, thanks to a recommendation from Colette's Sarah Lerfel, London's Dover Street Market. Owen had been a journalist and editor; Hill had worked in fashion, as well as founded a magazine.

In 2009, Owen and Hill opened a "gleaming, futuristic" pop-up store St. Martins Lane Hotel. Their older daughter, Iris, came up with the idea to name it "IDEA," after Iris, David, Edith (their younger daughter), and Angela.

In 2011, the couple created an Instagram account advertising and selling parts of their collection to a following of nearly half a million. Multiple times per day, Owen would post images of books to sell, after which they would often sell right away. In 2013, their page was deleted due to "violating nudity guidelines" from a book post. Since then, another Instagram account has been made, though one somewhat less focused on books.

Starting in the 2010s, Owen and Hill began booking appointments for customers to enter their "Secret Book Room" in Soho. Many fashion designers, design students, and other interested parties would stop by to peruse through their collection. IDEA would also still maintain pop-ups with and/or source for Dover Street Market locations in London, New York City, Tokyo, and Los Angeles. It also has a large Depop presence. In 2018, Owen and Hill were named to the Business of Fashion 500 for their work on IDEA as a brand and business.

In 2024, an "expanded shop" in Owen and Hill's building was opened to the public in 2024. While appointments are still recommended, walk-ins are generally allowed through a buzzer system. In addition to rare, vintage titles, the bookstore also launched a merchandise line of hats and tote bags with a "tongue-in-cheek" sensibility.

== Publishing ==
In 2014, IDEA pivoted to book publishing, with limited press runs of zines and monographs, among other kinds of books.

In 2016, IDEA published a photo book for Vetements ahead of their SS16 line; only 500 copies were printed, which were sold at the Comme des Garçons Trading Museum, various Dover Street Market locations, and online. In 2025, it published Nadia Lee Cohen and Martin Parr's book, Julia Bullard.

== Collaborations ==
In 2013, IDEA had an exhibition at London's Institute of Contemporary Arts titled Ibiza: Moments of Love which showcased the island of Ibiza through the lens of books, photographs, and other ephemera.

In 2017, IDEA and Stüssy partnered to release a branded cap as part of Dover Street Market's Open House in London. The same year, IDEA and Russian clothing brand KM20 released a red polo shirt with "ALL ENGLAND TECHNO CLUB" embroidered on its front.

In 2019, IDEA and footwear brand Rombaut on a pair of vegan Boccaccio sneakers adorned with padlocks.
