= Deutsche Zeitschrift für Philosophie =

- Discipline: Philosophy
- Language: German (abstracts in English)
- Edited by: Mischka Dammaschke

Publication details
- History: 1953–present
- Publisher: Akademie Verlag (Germany)
- Frequency: Bimonthly

Standard abbreviations
- ISO 4: Dtsch. Z. Philos.

Indexing
- ISSN: 0012-1045
- LCCN: 56019284
- OCLC no.: 472498234

Links
- Journal homepage

The Deutsche Zeitschrift für Philosophie (German: German Journal for Philosophy) is a bimonthly academic journal of philosophy publishing in German. It was established in 1953.

== See also ==
- List of philosophy journals
