= Instituto Brasileiro de Economia =

Brazilian research institute

The Instituto Brasileiro de Economia, (IBRE) (Brazilian Institute of Economics) is a Brazilian institute located in Rio de Janeiro. IBRE was founded in 1951, originally led by Jorge Kingston and Alexandre Kafka, linked to the Fundação Getúlio Vargas. IBRE focuses on measurements and applied research concerning the Brazilian economy. The IBRE includes: the Data Management Division ("Divisão de Gestão de Dados" – DGD) − in charge of producing and disseminating economic statistics; the Applied Economics Division ("Divisão de Economia Aplicada" – DEA) − in charge of studies on the Brazilian economy; and the Publications and Events Division ("Divisão de Publicações e Eventos" – DPE).

The Applied Economics Division (DEA) is made up of the Social Policy Center ("Centro de Políticas Sociais" – CPS), the Center for Agriculture Studies ("Centro de Estudos Agrícolas"), the Center for Economic Growth ("Centro de Crescimento Econômico"), the Center for International Trade and the Center for Economics and Petroleum Research ("Centro de Economia e Petróleo").

The Social Policy Center Regular CPS activities include generating statistics and analyses based on the processing of micro-data – one of the center's main characteristics – and contributing to the design, implementation and evaluation of public policies – industrial and general, at the domestic and international levels – and private sector strategies.

Other attributes of this IBRE unit are to stand as a forum for the debate of ideas and diagnoses of Brazilian society, to do field research, and to prepare professionals for the public and private sectors.

The Publication and Events Division (DPE) is responsible for publication of the Conjuntura Econômica review, founded in 1947 and the longest standing publication in Brazil in the field of specialized economic analysis. The monthly review includes articles and reports on the macro economy, scenarios, finance, marketing, management, insurance, and a comprehensive statistics and price indexes section.

IBRE made the first measurement of the Brazilian gross domestic product.
