= Les idées de ma maison =

Les idées de ma maison may refer to one of two media properties owned by Groupe TVA:

- Les idées de ma maison (My Home Ideas), a Canadian French language shelter magazine
- Les idées de ma maison télé, (My Home Ideas TV), a Canadian French language digital television channel, a spinoff of the magazine.
