= Idée fixe =

Idée fixe may refer to:

- Idée fixe (psychology), a psychological disorder
- Idée Fixe (album), a 1978 album by Aerolit
- Dogmatix, the English name of an Asterix comics character, called Idéfix in French
- Idée fixe (music), a recurring theme or motif, as in the Symphonie fantastique by Hector Berlioz

== See also ==
- Fixation (disambiguation)
- Leitmotif, a recurring musical phrase used as an element of musical structure
