= FGV Direito Rio =

The FGV Direito Rio (Fundação Getúlio Vargas Rio de Janeiro Law School) is a Brazilian private law higher education founded in 2002 in Rio de Janeiro by the Fundação Getúlio Vargas. The undergraduate program has been approved by the Brazilian Bar (the OAB examination) and by the Brazilian Ministry of Education, with maximum grades in every aspect. It has recently been ranked as the top Law School in Brazil, obtaining the highest national score in the Brazilian Bar Examination, first private Brazilian university to ever achieve that position.

== Specialization cycle ==
The Specialization Cycle allows concentrating studies in either of two proposed areas: Business Law, Public Defense and the Judiciary.

=== Business Law ===
This program is oriented towards Business Law. Subjects address current topics relevant to the corporate world, such as Advanced Corporate Law.

=== Public Defense and the Judiciary ===
This specialization program provides students with education to dedicate themselves to the various public legal careers: the Judiciary, Prosecution, Public Defense, the Attorney General's office, and the Third Sector.

The program also emphasizes subjects that shed light on the operation of public authorities and the specific action of public legal careers, such as public legal institutions, and state and federal judiciary structure.

== Internship opportunities ==
FGV Direito Rio has standing internship agreements with law firms in Rio de Janeiro, corporations, and public authorities — the Court of Justice and the State Prosecution, among others. Students will also have internship opportunities with projects developed by the school, such as the Technology and Society Center, a center of study of legal relationships involving intellectual property and technology, and the Justice and Society Center, whose activities involve collaboration to modernize and appreciate the Judiciary and Public Defense professions.

== FGV Law Online ==
FGV Law Online programs are 30-hour courses spread over two months. Their method is based on practical case studies supported by substantial references, including doctrine, law and case law. Every program is acknowledge by the Brazilian Bar/Rio de Janeiro and, for Rio de Janeiro students, are equivalent to 25 hours' internship.

== Technology and Society Center ==
The Technology and Society Center (Centro de Tecnologia e Sociedade, CTS) develops studies and projects in the areas of intellectual property, free software, Internet governance, and privacy on the Internet, and provides research and consultancy services to public and private entities, as well as to the third sector.

CTS has been accepted as a permanent observer of the World Intellectual Property Organization (WIPO).

== Justice and Society Center ==
The Justice and Society Center (Centro de Justiça e Sociedade, CJUS) has activities that are intended to collaborate with the modernization and appreciation of the judiciary and of public legal professions, to foster research and development of public legal careers and to contribute to the School's graduate programs.

In this sense, CJUS relies on support from several courts, from Brazilian Magistrates Association (AMB), the National Prosecutors Association (CONAMP), the National Public Defense Association (ANADEP) and private companies.
