= Idea (news agency) =

News agency based in Wetzlar, Germany

The Evangelische Nachrichtenagentur idea e. V. is a news agency based in Wetzlar. It products media "mainly about the Evangelical Movement and the evangelical assessment of church and secular processes" and also serves "the communication within the evangelical area".

== History and Objectives ==
=== Origins and Establishment ===
IDEA was founded in 1970 as the information service of the German Evangelical Alliance. The agency was established due to dissatisfaction among pietistic circles of German Protestantism with the Evangelical Press Service (epd), which was perceived as politically one-sided and unrepresentative of evangelical concerns. After several unsuccessful attempts to influence the epd's reporting, the decision was made to create an independent evangelical news service to provide a platform for their perspectives.

On February 17, 1972, the association idea (Informationsdienst der Evangelischen Allianz) e. V. was formally registered. The founding organizations included the German Evangelical Alliance, the Wetzlar-based broadcaster Evangeliums-Rundfunk, and the Association of Evangelical Missions. Horst Marquardt, representing the broadcaster, served as the association's first chairman.

In its early years, the agency's reports were primarily aimed at evangelical leaders and groups. Under the leadership of Helmut Matthies, who became editor-in-chief in 1977, the agency expanded its reach to the secular press and adopted a more professional journalistic style. In 1979, IDEA launched its weekly magazine, originally titled ideaSpektrum (now simply IDEA), to cater to a broader audience of clergy and lay members.

Helmut Matthies led the agency until 2017. He was succeeded by Matthias Pankau (2018–2022). Since June 2023, the agency has been led by a dual management team consisting of Daniela Städter and Dennis Pfeifer.

=== Position within Protestant Publishing ===
The relationship between IDEA and the official EKD news agency, the epd, has historically been characterized by tension regarding the "general mandate" for news coverage within the German Protestant church. While the EKD initially viewed IDEA as a niche supplement, IDEA's growing circulation and influence led to an "independent coexistence" between the two services.

From 1982 until 2020, the EKD provided a financial grant to IDEA. However, this funding became controversial, particularly due to IDEA's critical reporting on Islam and other theological differences. In 2017, the EKD Synod decided to phase out the grant, which ended in 2020. The funds were redirected to an innovation fund for various evangelical media projects.
