= Centro de Pesquisa e Documentação de História Contemporânea do Brasil =

Archive in Rio de Janeiro, Rio de Janeiro

Coordinates: 22.9411°S 43.1803°W

The Centro de Pesquisa e Documentação de História Contemporânea do Brasil (Contemporary Brazilian History Research and Documentation Center, CPDOC) is a Brazilian private higher education institution founded in 1973 and part of the Fundação Getúlio Vargas. In 2013 it also became officially known as the School of Social Sciences (Escola de Ciências Sociais) at FGV.

The CPDOC commenced activities in 2003 in the area of learning, with the launch of its Professional Master of Cultural Goods and Social Projects program, the first stricto sensu graduate course of its kind approved by CAPES.

In 2006, the activities of FGV's Escola Superior de Ciências Sociais (Higher School of Social Sciences) began, with the inauguration of the first Undergraduate Social Sciences Course class. In 2007, CPDOC academic master's and doctor's programs began. Finally, lato sensu graduate programs also exist in partnership with IDE. Therefore, CPDOC now provides courses at all levels.

CPDOC owns a collection of personal files of relevant public figures in the domestic stage post-1930, with around 1.5 million text documents, photographs, records and films. The personalities include Presidents of Brazil, state ministers and state governors. After being donated to the Center, the files are organized, preserved and disseminated.

There are also 1.1 thousand oral history interviews, with over 6 thousand hours and covering testimonials by social actors in politics, the Brazilian Armed Forces, science, technocracy, economy, journalism, the intellectual realm, the law, the third sector and grassroots movements.

CPDOC has also released more than 1.2 thousand titles published as books, articles, essays and other works. Noteworthy among the works produced is the Histórico-Biográfico Brasileiro Pós-1930 (2ª edição, Rio de Janeiro, FGV, 2001), and the weekly cross-disciplinary review Estudos Históricos.

The Center's main activities further include coordination of Espaço Cultural FGV, which operates at the Candelária street building, consulting services in the areas of Documentation, Oral History and Historic Research, the organization of exhibitions, and opinion polls. Market, public opinion and user satisfaction are some of the areas surveyed by its applied social research center, FGV-Opinião.
