= Escola de Economia de São Paulo =

Coordinates: 23.5599°S 46.6534°W

The Escola de Economia de São Paulo (São Paulo School of Economics – EESP) is a Brazilian private economics higher education institution founded in April, 2003, in São Paulo by the Fundação Getúlio Vargas.

== History ==
EESP was founded with strict graduate programs, academic master and doctor of economics courses, and the Professional Master of Finance and Economics course, each of which was acknowledged by CAPES. These courses already existed, but were transferred to the School of Economics. EESP also inaugurated its Specialization Course in Business Economics (CEABE), intended for practitioners in need of improving their knowledge of economics. The course offers three areas of specialization: the stock market, international economic relations, and business economics.

The Construction MBA was inaugurated in 2003, the result of a partnership with the São Paulo State Union of Construction Companies. More recently, the school launched the Specialization Course in Financial Economics (CEAFE) and the Pharmaceutical Industry MBA, in partnership with Febrafarma.

In 2006, the new FGV Agribusiness Center – GV Agro – was established with the purpose of becoming a think tank in this area, with emphasis on bi-energy and coordinated by former state minister and professor Roberto Rodrigues. The center will congregate learning activities and the formatting of Agribusiness MBA and Masters programs to be distributed by FGV's IDE, research, consulting and publications.
