= Festival of Ideas =

Festival of Ideas of Ideas Festival may refer to:

- Adelaide Festival of Ideas, held in Adelaide, South Australia, since 1999
- Aspen Ideas Festival, held in Aspen, Colorado, U.S. since 2005
- Bristol Festival of Ideas, held in Bristol, England, since 2005
- Ideas Festival, formerly held in Brisbane, Queensland, Australia (2006–2011)
- York Festival of Ideas, held in York, England, since 2011

== See also ==
- Pebble Beach Authors & Ideas Festival, held in Pebble Beach, California, U.S., since 2013 (formerly Carmel Authors and Ideas Festival, since 2007)
- Festival of Dangerous Ideas, held in Sydney, Australia, since 2009
- International Festival of Arts & Ideas, held in New Haven, Connecticut, U.S., since 1996
