= Ides =

Ides or IDES may refer to:

== Calendar dates ==
- Ides (calendar), a day in the Roman calendar that fell roughly in the middle of the month
  - Ides of March, a day in the Roman calendar that corresponded to March 15

== Music ==
- "St. Ides Heaven", a song by Elliott Smith, on his self-titled album
- "St. Ides of March", a song by Soledad Brothers (band)
- "The Ides of March", a song by Iron Maiden
- The Ides of March (band), an American rock band

== Other uses ==
- Intrusion Detection Expert System (IDES), an SRI International software product
- Saint Ides (c. 480 – c. 570), an Irish saint
- St. Ides, a brand of malt liquor
- Initiative for the Development of Soria or IDES, a Spanish political party
- Illinois Department of Employment Security

== See also ==
- IDE (disambiguation)
- St. Ides (disambiguation)
- Idis (Germanic), a being in Germanic paganism
