= Escola Brasileira de Administração Pública e de Empresas =

Brazilian School of Public and Business Administration
- Escola Brasileira de Administração Pública e de Empresas
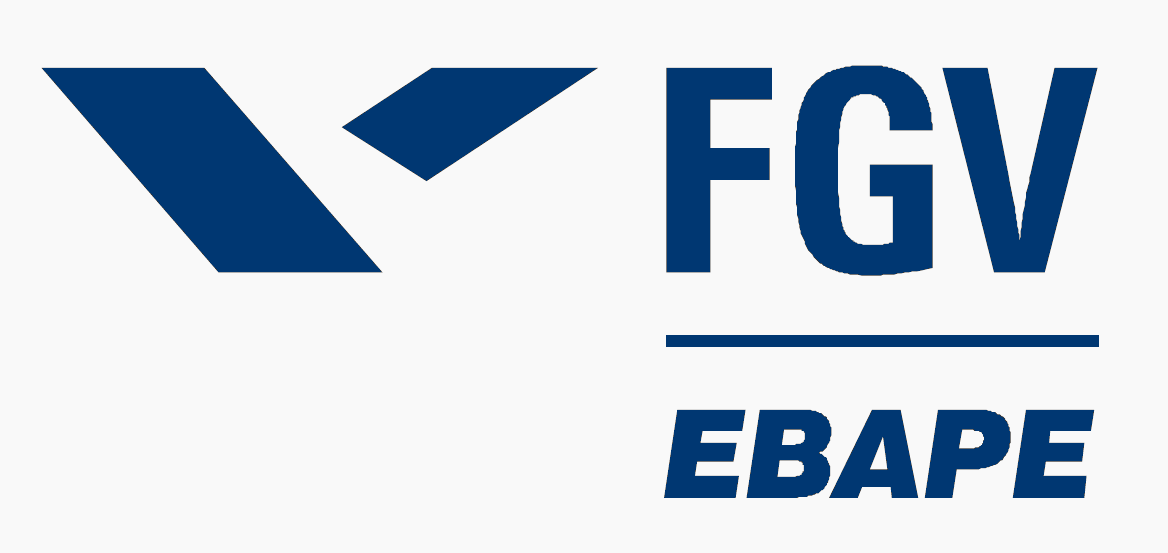
- Former names: EBAP
- Type: Private
- Established: 1952
- Affiliations: Fundação Getulio Vargas
- Dean: Flavio Carvalho de Vasconcelos
- Students: 800
- Location: (Brazil) Rio de Janeiro, RJ, Brazil; 22°56′31″S 43°10′46″W
- Campus: Urban
- Website: http://www.ebape.fgv.br

The Escola Brasileira de Administração Pública e de Empresas (EBAPE, Brazilian School of Public and Business Administration) is a Brazilian private higher education institution founded in April 1952 and linked to the Fundação Getúlio Vargas. The School also works as a research institution. Its academic programs include: Undergraduate in Administration, Online Undergraduate in Technological Management Processes (FGV Online), Master of Public Administration, Executive Master of Business Administration, Doctor of Administration and Post-Doctorate in Administration.

EBAPE has played an important role in training university and government personnel both in Brazil and in other countries in Latin America and Africa, also fostering cooperation between institutions and exchange programs. Over the years, these programs have been an incentive for developing joint research efforts and technical counseling projects with other Administration Schools.

Its academic policy is formulated by the Consultative Council made up of its faculty members. The board of directors is responsible for the administration of the School, though its Academic Training and Research Centers, Lato Sensu Graduate Center and Consultancy, Training and Managerial Development Centers.

In addition to the activities conducted at its head offices in Rio de Janeiro, EBAPE has extended and consolidated its work in regional centers around the country and abroad. Special programs in technical training and consultancy are held in Brasília and other Brazilian cities.

== History ==
=== 1950s ===
- Established in 1952, EBAPE was the first institution dedicated to Administration in the whole of Latin America.

=== 1960s ===
- Initial basis for the institutionalization of post-graduate degree in administration in the country.
- Pioneering the adoption of the credit system, replacing the graded system.
- Creation of the Course Master of Public Administration.
- Surge EBAPE with its current features: Teaching-Research-Technical Consulting.
- Editorial program supported by the Ford Foundation: unprecedented number of books and monographs on public administration.

=== 1970s ===
- Broadening the scope of external relations: the country and abroad.
- Consolidation of the masters course, with the inclusion of the area of public policy.
- Establishment of Intensive Graduate Program in Public Administration (Cipade) and various management development programs.
- Installation of the shares of the headquarters of EBAPE FGV Brasília, marking the beginning of the greater presence of the Foundation in that city.
- Participation as a founding member of the Associação Nacional de Programas de Pós-Graduação em Administração Pública (National Association of the Post-Graduate in Public Administration).

=== 1980s ===
- Expanding the role of EBAPE: over 2000 students in various cities of the country.
- Expansion of the international borders of the School: institutional relations with the U.S., Europe and Latin America, affiliation to international bodies: CLADEA, INTERMAN, CLAD. Permanent presence of teachers abroad.

=== 1990s ===
- Consolidation of post-graduate and intensification of consulting and training of human resources in public administration and the corporate sector of the state.
- Development of a regional action and support to government and municipal.
- International partnerships with the UN.
- Support programs OAS and CLAD.
- Reconciliation of the academic vocation and the ability to provide services: the pursuit of financial stability.
- Development Program Ph.D. in Business Administration.

== Undergraduate program ==
Located at the headquarters of the foundation, the undergraduate program of EBAPE is recognized as one of the best business schools of Brazil and even Latin America, although being part of a great and famous university, it is a school for a very restricted number of students. The school offers only 50 seats per year and currently has less than 400 students.
Despite the little number of students, EBAPE is one of the few schools of Brazil that has about 50 full-time professors.
All professors are PhDs and virtually all recently graduated students are already employed.

The program is divided into two cycles. The first two years constitute the Basic Management Cycle comprises courses that are the core issues and concepts central to the formation of the administrator. Matters concerning the area of mathematics develop the habit of logical and objective.

During the past two years that comprise the Professional Cycle, that provides students with the tools and expertise related to business administration and public policy. The disciplines to be taught in the last four semesters of course complement the knowledge acquired in Basic Cycle. The Professional Cycle also features two distinct emphases in Public Administration and Business Administration. The student, upon entering the 7th period, should choose which branch he would like to take to further the studies.

The college has strong rules of conduct and behavior, where no student or employee can enter the building dressed in shorts or slippers. It also hardly supports festivals or sporting events.

== Online Courses ==
EBAPE regulates the graduate course in technological management processes in partnership with FGV Online. This course is recognized by Associação Brasileira dos Estudantes de Educação a Distância (ABE-DL, Brazilian Association of Students of Distance Education) as the best distance learning course in the country, where only the FGV has received top marks in the assessment.

== Publications ==
=== RAP (Revista de Administração Pública) ===
The EBAPE publishes since 1967, the Revista de Administração Pública (Public Administration Magazine), printed bi-monthly, with high circulation in the technical-scientific sector. The publication receives sponsorship financing from:

- Bibliographie Latinoamericana D'Articles n 22 - 1987
- Handbook of Latin American Studies: Social Sciences, v 41- 1979
- International Bibliography of the Social Sciences - The London School of Economics
- Sumários Correntes Brasileiros
- Indices de Ciencias Sociais/ IUPERJ v. 9, 1979

=== RPBG (Revista Portuguesa e Brasileira de Gestão) ===
The Revista Portuguesa e Brasileira de Gestão (Brazilian and Portuguese Journal of Management), is a joint publication of INDEG/ISCTE and the Fundação Getulio Vargas since 2002, with simultaneous distribution in Portugal and Brazil, is a quarterly that provides a scientific approach and also disseminates the various areas of Management .

=== Revista OIT (Observatório de Inovação do Turismo) ===
The Revista Acadêmica Observatório de Inovação do Turismo (Journal of Academic Innovation Centre Tourism) is an initiative of the Center for Tourism of EBAPE, in partnership with the Brazilian Tourism Institute (Embratur), created with the purpose to serve the discussion of topics related to public and private management of tourism-oriented balance between theoretical and practical approaches.

The journal, published quarterly, is divided into three sections: articles, case studies and theoretical essays, book reviews and interviews. Your target audience consists of teachers, researchers, students, professionals and individuals interested in the literature of tourism. The magazine's mission is to stimulate the production and dissemination of knowledge about tourism that can contribute to academic activities and actions in public and private organizations.

== Rankings ==
=== Best Brazilians Schools ===
The IGC (General Index of Courses) is an annual ranking made by MEC, the Brazilian Ministry of Education, through INEP. EBAPE is one of the 11 brazilian universities that got the highest concept on all evaluations.

Year	Business Schools	Overall	Points	Total Schools
2012	1st	5th		1,799
2011	5th	12th		1,770
2010	4th	9th	435	1,828
2009	5th	14th	420	1,798
2008	1st	1st	469	1,700
2007	1st	3rd	467	1,529

== Alumni ==
- Wagner Siqueira - President of Rio de Janeiro's Regional Administration Council
- Roberto Cavalcanti - President of American Express - Latin America
- Maria Silvia Bastos Marques - Chairperson of Companhia Siderúrgica Nacional
- André Corrêa - Rio de Janeiro State Secretary of the Environment
