= Escola de Administração de Empresas de São Paulo =

Brazilian academic institution

The Escola de Administração de Empresas de São Paulo da Fundação Getulio Vargas (EAESP FGV) (Fundação Getulio Vargas's São Paulo School of Business Administration) is a Brazilian private higher education institution founded in 1954 as the result of joint efforts of the Brazilian government and business community with the objective to provide people with the skills needed to tackle the challenges Brazil was going through.

The school was established with the help of Michigan State University professors in the assembly of its academic system. In partnerships with some Brazilians companies and governmental bodies, EAESP maintains 20 studies and research center and a Junior Enterprise, the first one in Latin America. Among other degrees, EAESP offers four-year bachelor's degrees in business and public administration, MBA, MPA and other master's degrees, as well as doctoral programs.

In 2000, EAESP's undergraduate and graduate Administration programs were accredited by the Association to Advance Collegiate Schools of Business (AACSB). One year later, in 2001, its learning activities were again accredited with another international accreditation: European Quality Improvement System (EQUIS). In 2004, two of EAESP's courses were accredited by Association of MBAs (AMBA). EAESP is one of South American universities with these three accreditations.

== Research and Publications Center ("Núcleo de Pesquisas e Publicações" – NPP) ==
EAESP's Research and Publications Center − GVpesquisa − contains material for further research in the topics of Administration and related areas, such as Economics, Information Technology, Sociology and Psychology. Its Business Administration Reviews include RAE, GV-Executivo and RAE-eletrônica.

RAE, published since 1961, is written and published by a team of authors made up of faculty and students from EAESP and other institutions. In addition to RAE, EAESP has published, since 2002, GV-executivo, with a focus on business administration.

Together with Tuck School of Business at Dartmouth, Keio Business School in Tokyo, the School of Management of Fudan University in Shanghai, ESSEC Business School in France and Singapore, and the University of Mannheim in Germany, EAESP forged an alliance of leading business schools from all parts of the world in 2010 called "Council on Business and Society". The Council on Business & Society convenes a biennial forum that combines faculty members from each of the partner schools with that of representatives of business, government, and non-governmental organizations from around the world. The inaugural forum, held in Paris in November 2012, focused on Corporate Governance and Leadership. The 2014 forum was hosted by Keio Business School in Tokyo and focused on Health Care Delivery.

== Centros de Estudos (Studying Centres) ==
The Studying Centres have publications on relevant topics in Administration learning. They are formed by:

- Centro de Estudos em Planejamento e Gestão de Saúde – GVsaúde (Health Planning and Management Studies Center)
- Centro de Administração Pública e Governo – CEAPG (Public Administration and Government Center)
- Centro de Estudos em Ética nas Organizações – CENE (Organizational Ethics Studies Center)
- Centro de Estudos de Administração e do Meio Ambiente – CEAMA (Administration and the Environment Studies Center)
- Centro de Estudos em Cultura e Consumo – CECC (Culture and Consumption Studies Center)
- Centro de Estudos de Lazer e Turismo – CELT (Leisure and Travel Studies Center)
- Centro de Excelência Bancária – CEB (Banking Excellence Center)
- Centro de Tecnologia de Informação Aplicada – CIA (Applied Information Technology Center)
- Centro de Estudos do Terceiro Setor – CETS (Third Sector Studies Center)
- Centro de Estudos em Finanças – CEF (Finance Studies Center)
- Centro de Excelência em Varejo – CEV (Retail Excellence Center)
- Centro de Estudos Estratégicos Internacionais – CEEI (Strategic International Studies Center)
- Centro de Estudos em Sustentabilidade – CES (Sustainability Studies Center)
- Centro de Estudos em Private Equity e Venture Capital – CEPE (Private Equity and Venture Capital Research Center)
- Centro de Estudos em Tecnologia da Informação para Governo – TECiGOV (Governmental Information Technology Studies Center)
- Centro de Empreendedorismo e Novos Negócios – CENN (Enterprise and New Business Center)
- Centro de Estudos de Negócios da Propaganda – CENPRO (Advertising Business Studies Center)
- Centro de Excelência em Logística e Cadeias de Suprimento – CELOG (Logistics and Supply Chain Excellence Center)
- Centro de Estudos em Estratégia e Competitividade – CEEC (Strategy and Competitiveness Studies Center)
- Centro de Estudos de Política e Economia do Setor Público – CEPESP (Public Sector Policy and Economy Studies Center)
