= Fundação Getulio Vargas =

Brazilian higher education institution and think tank

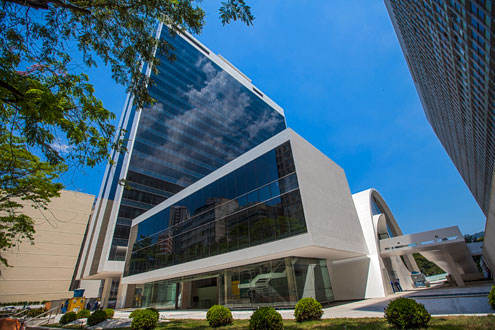
- FGV Headquarters in Rio de Janeiro, Brazil
- Other name: FGV
- Type: Private
- Established: December 20, 1944; 81 years ago
- Affiliations: Council on Business & Society, AACSB, AMBA, EQUIS
- President: Carlos Ivan Simonsen Leal
- Location: Rio de Janeiro, RJ, Brazil; 22.906908°S 43.178427°W
- Campus: Rio de Janeiro São Paulo Brasília
- Website: fgv.br/en
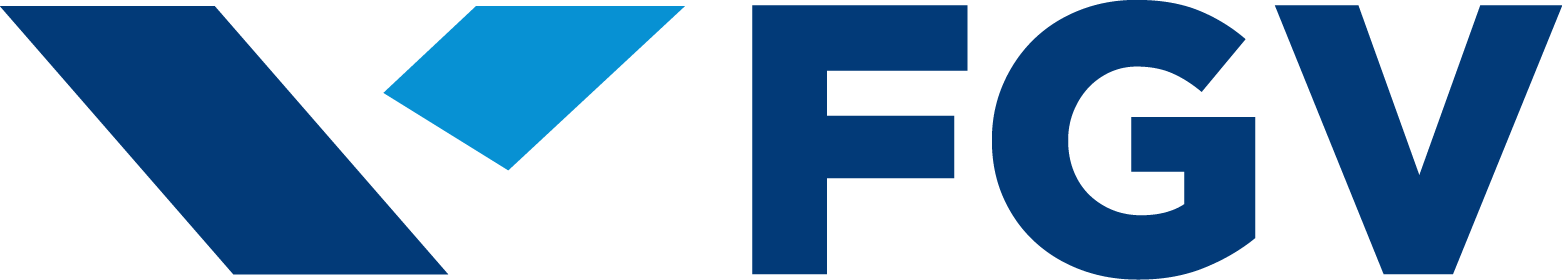

Fundação Getulio Vargas (Getulio Vargas Foundation, often abbreviated as FGV) is a Brazilian higher education institution and think tank based in Rio de Janeiro. It was founded on December 20, 1944.

The institution was created in the last days of the Estado Novo, as an independent institution to provide professional training to Brazil's bureaucracy. It subsequently also began to provide services to the private sector.

FGV is considered as the top think tank in Latin America by the Think Tanks and Civil Societies Program of the University of Pennsylvania, it also ranks seventh among the best think tanks in the world.

FGV offers undergraduate, MBA, as well as Master's & PhD programs in economics, business administration, public administration, law, social sciences, applied mathematics and international relations. The foundation has over 90 research centers and produces a large amount of academic research. The subjects cover macro and microeconomics, finance, business, decision-making, law, health, welfare, poverty and unemployment, pollution, and sustainable development. FGV also maintains research programs in the fields of history, social sciences, education, justice, citizenship, and politics. FGV executes projects at the request of the public sector as well, as private enterprises and international agencies such as the World Bank and the Inter-American Development Bank (IDB). Examples include assistance for the successful Rio de Janeiro bids for the 2007 Pan American Games and the 2016 Summer Olympics.

FGV's main office is based in Rio de Janeiro, and is also present in São Paulo and Brasília. In addition, it offers educational programs in over 100 cities in Brazil, through a network of affiliate partner institutions, with Executive Education and MBA programs in several areas of knowledge.

== Schools of Administration ==
- Brazilian School of Public and Business Administration (FGV EBAPE)
- São Paulo School of Business Administration (FGV EAESP)
- School of Public Policy and Government (FGV EPPG)

== Schools of Law ==
- São Paulo Law School (FGV Direito SP)
- Rio de Janeiro Law School (FGV Direito Rio)

== Schools of Economics ==
- São Paulo School of Economics (FGV EESP)
- Brazilian School of Economics and Finance (FGV EPGE)

== Schools of Social Sciences ==
- School of Social Sciences (FGV CPDOC)
- School of International Relations (FGV RI)

== School of Applied Mathematics ==
- School of Applied Mathematics (FGV EMAp)

== Institute for Educational Development ==
- Executive Education
- FGV Online
- FGV In Company

== Services, Indexes and Publications ==
- FGV Press
- FGV Projetos
- Brazilian Institute of Economics

== Centers and Divisions ==
- Business Cooperation Committee
- Chamber FGV of Mediation & Arbitration
- Center for the Development of Mathematics and Science
- Center for Global Economics
- Center for Regulation and Infrastructure Studies
- Department of Public Policy Analysis
- FGV Energy - Center for Energy Studies
- FGV Social - Center for Social Policy
- Growth & Development - Center for Growth and Economic Development Studies
- International Affairs Division
- International Intelligence Unit

== General Administration ==
- Applied Research and Knowledge Network
- Communications and Marketing Division
- Controllership Superintendent's Office
- Division of Operations
- FGV Library System
- Human Resources Division
- Internal Control Division
- Provost Office
- Treasury

== Accreditation ==
The São Paulo School of Business Administration is the only Brazilian school to receive Triple accreditation from all three major international accreditation institutions (and one of only 82 schools worldwide):

- AACSB
- AMBA
- EQUIS (EFMD)

== International Partnerships ==
FGV has over 200 academic cooperation agreements with renowned institutions all over the world, which include research, joint projects and exchange of students and professors.

== See also ==
- Brazil University Rankings
- Universities and Higher Education in Brazil
