= List of Pan American Games medalists in boxing =

This is the complete list of Pan American Games medalists in boxing from 1951 to 2015.

== Men's events ==
=== Light Flyweight ===
- 48 kg (1971–2007)
- 49 kg (2011–)

| Games | Gold | Silver | Bronze |
|---|---|---|---|
| 1971 | Rafael Carbonell; Cuba | Héctor Velásquez; Chile | Salvador García; Mexico Juan Carlos Ríos; Argentina |
| 1975 | Jorge Hernández; Cuba | Eleoncio Mercedes; Dominican Republic | Reinaldo Becerra; Venezuela Arturo Urruzquieta; Mexico |
| 1979 | Héctor Ramírez; Cuba | Richie Sandoval; United States | Eduardo Burgos; Chile Gilberto Sosa; Mexico |
| 1983 | Rafael Ramos; Puerto Rico | Paul Gonzales; United States | Héctor Díaz; Dominican Republic Manoelito Santos; Brazil |
| 1987 | Luis Román Rolón; Puerto Rico | Michael Carbajal; United States | Juan Torres Odelín; Cuba Jesús Beltre; Dominican Republic |
| 1991 | Rogelio Marcelo; Cuba | Ricardo Sánchez López; Mexico | Nelson Dieppa; Puerto Rico Fernando Retayud; Colombia |
| 1995 | Édgar Velásquez; Venezuela | Juan Ramírez; Cuba | Geovany Baca; Honduras Albert Guardado; United States |
| 1999 | Maikro Romero; Cuba | Liborio Romero; Mexico | Carlo Pizarro; Puerto Rico Patricio Calero; Ecuador |
| 2003 | Yan Bartelemí; Cuba | Carlos Tamara; Colombia | José Jefferson Perez; Venezuela Raúl Castañeda; Mexico |
| 2007 | Luis Yáñez; United States | Kevin Betancourt; Venezuela | Winston Montero; Dominican Republic Carlos Ortiz; Puerto Rico |
| 2011 | Joselito Velázquez; Mexico | Yosvany Veitía; Cuba | Jantony Ortiz; Puerto Rico |
| 2011 | Joselito Velázquez; Mexico | Yosvany Veitía; Cuba | Juan Medina Herrad; Dominican Republic |
| 2015 | Joselito Velázquez; Mexico | Joahnys Argilagos; Cuba | Yoel Finol; Venezuela |
| 2015 | Joselito Velázquez; Mexico | Joahnys Argilagos; Cuba | Victor Santillan; Dominican Republic |
| 2019 | Oscar Collazo; Puerto Rico | Yuberjen Martínez; Colombia | Kevin Arias; Guatemala |
| 2019 | Oscar Collazo; Puerto Rico | Yuberjen Martínez; Colombia | Damián Arce; Cuba |

=== Flyweight ===
- 51 kg (1951–2007)
- 52 kg (2011–)

| Games | Gold | Silver | Bronze |
|---|---|---|---|
| 1951 | Alberto Barenghi; Argentina | Germán Pardo; Chile | Raúl Macías; Mexico |
| 1955 | Hilario Correa; Mexico | Manuel Lugo Vega; Chile | Ramón Arias; Venezuela |
| 1959 | Miguel Ángel Botta; Argentina | José Martins; Brazil | Tito Blanco; Venezuela |
| 1963 | Floreal García; Uruguay | Pedro Dias; Brazil | Robert Carmody; United States |
| 1967 | Francisco Rodríguez; Venezuela | Ricardo Delgado; Mexico | Walter Henry; Canada Harlan Marbley; United States |
| 1971 | Francisco Rodríguez; Venezuela | Arturo Delgado; Mexico | Douglas Rodríguez; Cuba Bobby Hunter; United States |
| 1975 | Ramón Duvalón; Cuba | Victor Vinuesa; Ecuador | Roberto Espinosa; El Salvador Alfredo Pérez; Venezuela |
| 1979 | Alberto Mercado; Puerto Rico | Pedro Nolasco; Dominican Republic | Ian Clyde; Canada Jerome Coffee; United States |
| 1983 | Pedro Orlando Reyes; Cuba | Laureano Ramírez; Dominican Republic | Jesus Poll; Venezuela Steve McCrory; United States |
| 1987 | Adalberto Regalado; Cuba | David Grimán; Venezuela | Hamilton Rodrigues; Brazil Rafael Ramos; Puerto Rico |
| 1991 | José Ramos; Cuba | David Serradas; Venezuela | Luiz Freitas; Brazil Stephan Rose; Guyana |
| 1995 | Joan Guzmán; Dominican Republic | Raúl González Sánchez; Cuba | José Luis López; Venezuela José Juan Cotto; Puerto Rico |
| 1999 | Omar Narváez; Argentina | José Navarro; United States | Daniel Ponce de León; Mexico Manuel Mantilla; Cuba |
| 2003 | Yuriorkis Gamboa; Cuba | Juan Carlos Payano; Dominican Republic | Raúl Hirales; Mexico James Pereira; Brazil |
| 2007 | McWilliams Arroyo; Puerto Rico | Juan Carlos Payano; Dominican Republic | Yoandris Salinas; Cuba Braulio Ávila; Mexico |
| 2011 | Robeisy Ramírez; Cuba | Dagoberto Aguero; Dominican Republic | Braulio Ávila; Mexico |
| 2011 | Robeisy Ramírez; Cuba | Dagoberto Aguero; Dominican Republic | Julião Henriques Neto; Brazil |
| 2015 | Antonio Vargas; United States | Yosvany Veitía; Cuba | Ceiber Ávila; Colombia |
| 2015 | Antonio Vargas; United States | Yosvany Veitía; Cuba | David Jimenez; Costa Rica |
| 2019 | Rodrigo Marte; Dominican Republic | Yosvany Veitía; Cuba | Yankiel Rivera; Puerto Rico |
| 2019 | Rodrigo Marte; Dominican Republic | Yosvany Veitía; Cuba | Ramón Quiroga; Argentina |

=== Bantamweight ===
- 54 kg (1951–2007)
- 56 kg (2011–)

| Games | Gold | Silver | Bronze |
|---|---|---|---|
| 1951 | Ricardo Gonzales; Argentina | Ali Martucci; Venezuela | Juan Rodríguez; Chile |
| 1955 | Salvador Enriquez; Venezuela | Wardy Yee; United States | Roberto Lobos; Chile |
| 1959 | Waldomiro Pinto; Brazil | Carlos Cañete; Argentina | Pete Spanakos; United States |
| 1963 | Abel Almarez; Argentina | Marcíal Guttiérez; Panama | Arthur Jones; United States |
| 1967 | Juvencio Martínez; Mexico | Fermin Espinosa; Cuba | Guillermo Velásquez; Chile Armando Mendoza; Venezuela |
| 1971 | Pedro Flores; Mexico | Calixto Pérez; Colombia | Roger Buchely; Ecuador Ricardo Carreras; United States |
| 1975 | Orlando Martínez; Cuba | Bernard Taylor; United States | Alejandro Silva; Puerto Rico Ángel Pacheco; Venezuela |
| 1979 | Jackie Beard; United States | Luis Pizarro; Puerto Rico | Héctor Lazaro; Cuba Santiago Caballero; Venezuela |
| 1983 | Manuel Vilchez; Venezuela | Pedro Nolasco; Dominican Republic | Robinsón Pitalúa; Colombia Floyd Favors; United States |
| 1987 | Manuel Martínez; Cuba | Michael Collins; United States | Domingo Damigella; Argentina Rafael del Valle; Puerto Rico |
| 1991 | Enrique Carrión; Cuba | Carlos Gerena; Puerto Rico | Luis Alberto Ojeda; Venezuela Javier Calderón; Mexico |
| 1995 | Juan Despaigne; Cuba | José Cotto; Puerto Rico | John Nolasco; Dominican Republic Claude Lambert; Canada |
| 1999 | Gerald Tucker; United States | Nehomar Cermeño; Venezuela | Waldemar Font; Cuba Ceferino Labarda; Argentina |
| 2003 | Guillermo Rigondeaux; Cuba | Abner Mares; Mexico | Andrew Kooner; Canada Yonnhy Pérez; Colombia |
| 2007 | Carlos Cuadras; Mexico | Claudio Marrero; Dominican Republic | James Pereira; Brazil Clive Atwell; Guyana |
| 2011 | Lázaro Álvarez; Cuba | Óscar Valdez; Mexico | Angel Rodriguez; Venezuela |
| 2011 | Lázaro Álvarez; Cuba | Óscar Valdez; Mexico | Robenílson de Jesus; Brazil |
| 2015 | Andy Cruz; Cuba | Héctor García; Dominican Republic | Kenny Lally; Canada |
| 2015 | Andy Cruz; Cuba | Héctor García; Dominican Republic | Francisco Martinez; United States |
| 2019 | Osvel Caballero; Cuba | Duke Ragan; United States | Lucas Fernández; Uruguay |
| 2019 | Osvel Caballero; Cuba | Duke Ragan; United States | Alexy de la Cruz; Dominican Republic |

=== Featherweight ===
- 57 kg (1951–2007)

| Games | Gold | Silver | Bronze |
|---|---|---|---|
| 1951 | Francisco Núñez; Argentina | Augusto Carcamo; Chile | Juan Alvarado; Mexico |
| 1955 | Oswaldo Cañete; Argentina | Claudio Barrientos; Chile | Marcial Galicia; Mexico |
| 1959 | Carlos Aro; Argentina | Charles Brown; United States | Mario Garate; Chile |
| 1963 | Rosemiro Mateus; Brazil | Héctor Pace; Argentina | Charles Brown; United States |
| 1967 | Miguel García; Argentina | Francisco Oduardo; Cuba | Freiton Caban; Puerto Rico Al Robinson; United States |
| 1971 | Juan Francisco García; Mexico | José Baptista; Venezuela | Manuel Torres; Cuba Enrique Alonso; Panama |
| 1975 | Davey Armstrong; United States | Genovefo Grinan; Cuba | Hugo Rengifo; Venezuela Carlos Calderón; Puerto Rico |
| 1979 | Bernard Taylor; United States | Naudy Piñero; Venezuela | Fernando Sosa; Argentina Felipe Orozco; Colombia |
| 1983 | Adolfo Horta; Cuba | Santos Cardona; Puerto Rico | Bernard Gary; United States Rafael Zuñiga; Colombia |
| 1987 | Kelcie Banks; United States | Emilio Villegas; Dominican Republic | Frank Avelar; El Salvador Esteban Flores; Puerto Rico |
| 1991 | Arnaldo Mesa; Cuba | Kenneth Friday; United States | Rogério Dezorzi; Brazil Arnulfo Castillo; Mexico |
| 1995 | Arnaldo Mesa; Cuba | Alex Trujillo; Puerto Rico | Luis Ernesto José; Dominican Republic Cristian Rodríguez; Argentina |
| 1999 | Yudel Johnson; Cuba | Zayas Younan; Canada | Jorge Martínez; Mexico Aaron Torres; United States |
| 2003 | Likar Ramos Concha; Colombia | Aaron Garcia; United States | Jhonathan Batista; Dominican Republic Yosvani Aguilera; Cuba |
| 2007 | Idel Torriente; Cuba | Abner Cotto; Puerto Rico | Davi Souza; Brazil Orlando Rizo; Nicaragua |

=== Lightweight ===
- 60 kg (1951–)

| Games | Gold | Silver | Bronze |
|---|---|---|---|
| 1951 | Oscar Gallardo; Argentina | Fernando Araneda; Chile | Willie Hunter; United States |
| 1955 | Miguel Angel Péndola; Argentina | Gerardo Clemente; Puerto Rico | Ricardo Orta; Venezuela |
| 1959 | Abel Laudonio; Argentina | Gualberto Gutiérrez; Uruguay | Mario Romero; Venezuela |
| 1963 | Roberto Caminero; Cuba | João da Silva; Brazil | Barry Foster; Jamaica |
| 1967 | Enrique Regüeiferos; Cuba | Luis Minami; Peru | Ronald Harris; United States Juan Rivero; Uruguay |
| 1971 | Luis Davila; Puerto Rico | Alfonso Pérez; Colombia | Marco Juardo; Ecuador James Busceme; United States |
| 1975 | Chris Clarke; Canada | Aaron Pryor; United States | Odalis Perez; Venezuela Luis Echaide; Cuba |
| 1979 | Adolfo Horta; Cuba | Roberto Andino; Puerto Rico | Rafael Rodriguez; Dominican Republic Guillermo Fernández; Venezuela |
| 1983 | Pernell Whitaker; United States | Ángel Herrera Vera; Cuba | Alberto Cortez; Argentina Ángel Beltré; Dominican Republic |
| 1987 | Julio González Valladares; Cuba | José Pérez; Venezuela | Héctor Arroyo; Puerto Rico Marc Menard; Canada |
| 1991 | Julio González Valladares; Cuba | Patrice Brooks; United States | Delroy Leslie; Jamaica William Irwin; Canada |
| 1995 | Julio González Valladares; Cuba | Acelino Freitas; Brazil | Francisco Osorio; Colombia Michael Strange; Canada |
| 1999 | Mario Kindelán; Cuba | Dana Laframboise; Canada | Patrick López; Venezuela Cristián Bejarano; Mexico |
| 2003 | Mario Kindelán; Cuba | Alex de Jesús; Puerto Rico | Félix Díaz; Dominican Republic Francisco Vargas; Mexico |
| 2007 | Yordenis Ugás; Cuba | Éverton Lopes; Brazil | Luis Rueda; Argentina José Pedraza; Puerto Rico |
| 2011 | Yasnier Toledo; Cuba | Robson Conceição; Brazil | Ángel Suárez; Puerto Rico |
| 2011 | Yasnier Toledo; Cuba | Robson Conceição; Brazil | Ángel Gutiérrez; Mexico |
| 2015 | Lázaro Álvarez; Cuba | Lindolfo Delgado; Mexico | Kevin Luna; Guatemala |
| 2015 | Lázaro Álvarez; Cuba | Lindolfo Delgado; Mexico | José Rosario; Puerto Rico |
| 2019 | Lázaro Álvarez; Cuba | Leonel de los Santos; Dominican Republic | Leodan Pezo; Peru |
| 2019 | Lázaro Álvarez; Cuba | Leonel de los Santos; Dominican Republic | Luis Angel Cabrera; Venezuela |

=== Light Welterweight ===
- 63,5 kg (1951–1999)
- 64 kg (2003–)

| Games | Gold | Silver | Bronze |
|---|---|---|---|
| 1955 | Juan Carlos Rivero; Argentina | William Morton; United States | Celestino Pinto; Brazil |
| 1959 | Vince Shomo; United States | Luis Aranda; Argentina | Humberto Dip; Mexico |
| 1963 | Adolfo Moreira; Argentina | Orlando Nuñes; Brazil | Quincey Daniels; United States |
| 1967 | Jim Wallington; United States | Hugo Sclarandi; Argentina | Alfredo Morales; Mexico Guillermo Salcedo; Venezuela |
| 1971 | Enrique Regüeiferos; Cuba | José Vasquez; Colombia | Wiley Johnson; United States Reginald Forde; Guyana |
| 1975 | Sugar Ray Leonard; United States | Victor Corona; Cuba | Jesús Navas; Venezuela Jesus Marte; Dominican Republic |
| 1979 | Lemuel Steeples; United States | Hugo Hernández; Argentina | José Aguilar; Cuba Pedro Cruz; Puerto Rico |
| 1983 | Candelario Duvergel; Cuba | Jerry Page; United States | Genaro León; Mexico Giovanni Sepulveda; Dominican Republic |
| 1987 | Candelario Duvergel; Cuba | Todd Foster; United States | Wanderley Oliveira; Brazil Daniel Cueto; Panama |
| 1991 | Stevie Johnston; United States | Edgar Ruiz; Mexico | Luis da Silva; Brazil Aníbal Santiago Acevedo; Puerto Rico |
| 1995 | Walter Crucce; Argentina | Luis Deines Pérez; Puerto Rico | Héctor Vinent; Cuba Fernando Vargas; United States |
| 1999 | Victor Hugo Castro; Argentina | Kelson Pinto; Brazil | Diógenes Luna; Cuba Corey Bernard; United States |
| 2003 | Patrick López; Venezuela | Isidro Mosquea; Dominican Republic | Juan de Dios Navarro; Mexico Marcos Costa; Brazil |
| 2007 | Karl Dargan; United States | Jonathan González Ortiz; Puerto Rico | Myke Carvalho; Brazil Inocente Fiss; Cuba |
| 2011 | Roniel Iglesias; Cuba | Valentino Knowles; Bahamas | Joelvis Hernandes; Venezuela |
| 2011 | Roniel Iglesias; Cuba | Valentino Knowles; Bahamas | Éverton Lopes; Brazil |
| 2015 | Arthur Biyarslanov; Canada | Yasniel Toledo; Cuba | Joedison Teixeira; Brazil |
| 2015 | Arthur Biyarslanov; Canada | Yasniel Toledo; Cuba | Luis Arcon; Venezuela |
| 2019 | Andy Cruz; Cuba | Keyshawn Davis; United States | Alston Ryan; Antigua and Barbuda |
| 2019 | Andy Cruz; Cuba | Keyshawn Davis; United States | Michael Alexander; Trinidad and Tobago |

=== Welterweight ===
- 67 kg (1951–1999)
- 69 kg (2003–)

| Games | Gold | Silver | Bronze |
|---|---|---|---|
| 1951 | Oscar Pietta; Argentina | Cristobal Hernández; Cuba | José Dávalos; Mexico |
| 1955 | James Dorando; United States | Antonio Nigri; Argentina | — |
| 1959 | Alfredo Cornejo; Chile | Aurelio González; Argentina | Manuel Alves; Brazil |
| 1963 | Misael Vilugrón; Chile | Rubens Vasconcelos; Brazil | Felipe Pereyra; Argentina |
| 1967 | Andrés Molina; Cuba | Mario Guilloti; Argentina | Alfonso Ramírez; Mexico Jesse Valdez; United States |
| 1971 | Emilio Correa; Cuba | Larry Carlisle; United States | Jovito Díaz; Venezuela Sergio Lozano; Mexico |
| 1975 | Clinton Jackson; United States | Kenny Bristol; Guyana | Pedro Gamarro; Venezuela Emilio Correa; Cuba |
| 1979 | Andrés Aldama; Cuba | Mike McCallum; Jamaica | José Baret; Dominican Republic Javier Colin; Mexico |
| 1983 | Louis Howard; United States | José Aguilar; Cuba | Luis Luis García; Venezuela Antonio Madureira; Brazil |
| 1987 | Juan Carlos Lemus; Cuba | Kenneth Gould; United States | Pedro Frias; Dominican Republic Rey Rivera; Puerto Rico |
| 1991 | Juan Hernández Sierra; Cuba | Greg Johnson; Canada | Santos Beltrán; Mexico José Guzmán; Venezuela |
| 1995 | David Reid; United States | Daniel Santos; Puerto Rico | Hercules Kyvelos; Canada Tomás Leyva; Guatemala |
| 1999 | Juan Hernández Sierra; Cuba | Jeremy Molitor; Canada | LeChaunce Shepherd; United States Charlie Navarro; Venezuela |
| 2003 | Lorenzo Aragón; Cuba | Juan McPherson; United States | Euri González; Dominican Republic Alfredo Angulo; Mexico |
| 2007 | Pedro Lima; Brazil | Demetrius Andrade; United States | Diego Chaves; Argentina Ricardo Smith; Jamaica |
| 2011 | Carlos Banteux; Cuba | Óscar Molina; Mexico | Mian Hussain; Canada |
| 2011 | Carlos Banteux; Cuba | Óscar Molina; Mexico | Myke Carvalho; Brazil |
| 2015 | Gabriel Maestre; Venezuela | Roniel Iglesias; Cuba | Juan Ramón Solano; Dominican Republic |
| 2015 | Gabriel Maestre; Venezuela | Roniel Iglesias; Cuba | Alberto Palmetta; Argentina |
| 2019 | Roniel Iglesias; Cuba | Rohan Polanco; Dominican Republic | Gabriel Maestre; Venezuela |
| 2019 | Roniel Iglesias; Cuba | Rohan Polanco; Dominican Republic | Delante Johnson; United States |

=== Light Middleweight ===
- 71 kg (1955–1999)

| Games | Gold | Silver | Bronze |
|---|---|---|---|
| 1955 | Paul Wright; United States | Raul Tovar; Venezuela | Alberto Sáenz; Argentina |
| 1959 | Wilbert McClure; United States | José Burgos; Venezuela | Hélio Crescêncio; Brazil |
| 1963 | Elecio Neves; Brazil | Manuel Sánchez; Peru | Osvaldo Mariño; Argentina |
| 1967 | Rolando Garbey; Cuba | Víctor Galíndez; Argentina | Agustín Zaragoza; Mexico Donato Paduano; Canada |
| 1971 | Rolando Garbey; Cuba | Emeterio Villanueva; Mexico | Bernard Guindon; Canada Reggie Jones; United States |
| 1975 | Rolando Garbey; Cuba | Michael Prevost; Canada | Alfredo Lemus; Venezuela Chuck Walker; United States |
| 1979 | José Angel Molina; Puerto Rico | James Shuler; United States | Francisco de Jesus; Brazil Jorge Amparo; Dominican Republic |
| 1983 | Orestes Solano; Cuba | Dennis Milton; United States | Dario Matteoni; Argentina Héctor Ortíz; Puerto Rico |
| 1987 | Orestes Solano; Cuba | Freddy Sanchez; Puerto Rico | Frankie Liles; United States Gary Smikle; Jamaica |
| 1991 | Juan Carlos Lemus; Cuba | Miguel Jiménez; Puerto Rico | Lucas França; Brazil Ravea Springs; United States |
| 1995 | Alfredo Duvergel; Cuba | Derbys Álvarez; Venezuela | Kurt Sinette; Trinidad and Tobago Jason Smith; Canada |
| 1999 | Jorge Gutiérrez; Cuba | Scott MacIntosh; Canada | Euri González; Dominican Republic Sean Black; Jamaica |

=== Middleweight ===
- 75 kg (1951–)

| Games | Gold | Silver | Bronze |
|---|---|---|---|
| 1951 | Ubaldo Pereira; Argentina | Paulo Sacoman; Brazil | Manuel Vargas; Chile |
| 1955 | Orville Pitts; United States | Miguel Safatle; Chile | Arnaldo Serra; Argentina |
| 1959 | Abrao de Souza; Brazil | Bob Foster; United States | Carl Crawford; Guyana |
| 1963 | Luiz Cézar; Brazil | Leonardo Alcolea; Cuba | Fidel Odreman; Venezuela |
| 1967 | Jorge Ahumada; Argentina | Luiz Fabre; Brazil | Joaquin Delis; Cuba Carlos Franco; Uruguay |
| 1971 | Faustino Quinales; Venezuela | Jerry Otis; United States | Agustín Zaragoza; Mexico Carlos Franco; Uruguay |
| 1975 | Alejandro Montoya; Cuba | Fernando Martins; Brazil | Nicolás Arredondo; Mexico Ildefonso Gomez; Nicaragua |
| 1979 | José Gómez Mustelier; Cuba | Carlos Fonseca; Brazil | Alfred Thomas; Guyana Oscar Florentín; Argentina |
| 1983 | Bernardo Comas; Cuba | Alfredo Delgado; Puerto Rico | Pedro Gamarro; Venezuela John Smith; Trinidad and Tobago |
| 1987 | Angel Espinosa; Cuba | Otis Grant; Canada | Carlos Herrera; Venezuela Juan Montiel; Uruguay |
| 1991 | Ramón Garbey; Cuba | Chris Johnson; Canada | Richard Santiago; Puerto Rico Michael DeMoss; United States |
| 1995 | Ariel Hernández; Cuba | Ricardo Araneda; Chile | Jhon Arroyo; Colombia Ronald Simms; United States |
| 1999 | Yohanson Martínez; Cuba | Arthur Palac; United States | José Herrera; Colombia Jim Rodriguez; Venezuela |
| 2003 | Juan Ubaldo; Dominican Republic | Yordanis Despaigne; Cuba | Jean Pascal; Canada Alexander Brand; Colombia |
| 2007 | Emilio Correa; Cuba | Argenis Núñez; Dominican Republic | Glaucélio Abreu; Brazil Carlos Góngora; Ecuador |
| 2011 | Emilio Correa; Cuba | Jaime Cortez; Ecuador | Juan Carlos Rodriguez; Venezuela |
| 2011 | Emilio Correa; Cuba | Jaime Cortez; Ecuador | Brody Blair; Canada |
| 2015 | Arlen López; Cuba | Jorge Vivas; Colombia | Misael Rodríguez; Mexico |
| 2015 | Arlen López; Cuba | Jorge Vivas; Colombia | Endry José Pinto; Venezuela |
| 2019 | Arlen López; Cuba | Hebert Conceição; Brazil | Lesther Espino; Nicaragua |
| 2019 | Arlen López; Cuba | Hebert Conceição; Brazil | Troy Isley; United States |

=== Light Heavyweight ===
- 81 kg (1951–)

| Games | Gold | Silver | Bronze |
|---|---|---|---|
| 1951 | Rinaldo Ansaloni; Argentina | Lucio Grotone; Brazil | John Stewart; United States |
| 1955 | Luiz Inácio; Brazil | Antonio Escalante; Argentina | John Stewart; United States |
| 1959 | Amos Johnson; United States | Rafael Gargiulo; Argentina | Carlos Lucas; Chile |
| 1963 | Fred Lewis; United States | Ronald Holmes; Jamaica | Ruben Alves; Brazil |
| 1967 | Arthur Redden; United States | Juan José Torres; Argentina | Manuel Castanon; Mexico Marijan Kholar; Canada |
| 1971 | Raymond Russell; United States | Waldemar de Oliveira; Brazil | William Titley; Canada Humberto Salguero; Argentina |
| 1975 | Rene Pedroso; Cuba | Leon Spinks; United States | João Batista; Brazil Juan Suárez; Argentina |
| 1979 | Tony Tucker; United States | Dennis Jackson; Puerto Rico | Patrick Fennel; Canada Clemente Ortiz; Dominican Republic |
| 1983 | Pablo Romero; Cuba | Evander Holyfield; United States | Miguel Mosna; Argentina Carlos Salazar; Venezuela |
| 1987 | Pablo Romero; Cuba | Nelson Adams; Puerto Rico | Wilfred Moses; Guyana Andrew Maynard; United States |
| 1991 | Orestes Solano; Cuba | Raimundo Yant; Venezuela | Dale Brown; Canada Terrence Poole; Guyana |
| 1995 | Antonio Tarver; United States | Thompson García; Ecuador | Edgardo Santos; Puerto Rico Gabriel Hernández; Dominican Republic |
| 1999 | Humberto Savigne; Cuba | Laudelino Barros; Brazil | Troy Amos-Ross; Canada Hugo Garay; Argentina |
| 2003 | Ramiro Reducindo; Mexico | Yoan Pablo Hernández; Cuba | Edgar Muñoz; Venezuela Argenis Casimiro; Dominican Republic |
| 2007 | Eleider Álvarez; Colombia | Yusiel Nápoles; Cuba | Julio Castillo; Ecuador Christopher Downs; United States |
| 2011 | Julio César La Cruz; Cuba | Yamaguchi Falcão; Brazil | Carlos Góngora; Ecuador |
| 2011 | Julio César La Cruz; Cuba | Yamaguchi Falcão; Brazil | Armando Pina; Mexico |
| 2015 | Julio César La Cruz; Cuba | Albert Ramírez; Venezuela | Juan Carlos Carrillo; Colombia |
| 2015 | Julio César La Cruz; Cuba | Albert Ramírez; Venezuela | Rogelio Romero; Mexico |
| 2019 | Julio César La Cruz; Cuba | Keno Machado; Brazil | Nalek Korbaj; Venezuela |
| 2019 | Julio César La Cruz; Cuba | Keno Machado; Brazil | Rogelio Romero; Mexico |

=== Heavyweight ===
- +81 kg (1951–1979)
- 91 kg (1983–)

| Games | Gold | Silver | Bronze |
|---|---|---|---|
| 1951 | Jorge Vertone; Argentina | Víctor Bignon; Chile | Norvel Lee; United States |
| 1955 | Pablo Alexis Miteff; Argentina | Adão Waldemar; Brazil | Norvel Lee; United States |
| 1959 | Allen Hudson; United States | Eduardo Corletti; Argentina | Jurandyr Nicolau; Brazil |
| 1963 | Lee Carr; United States | José E. Jorge; Brazil | Raul Aguilar; Uruguay |
| 1967 | Forrest Ward; United States | José Cabrera; Cuba | Ricardo Aguad; Argentina |
| 1971 | Duane Bobick; United States | Joaquín Rocha; Mexico | Teófilo Stevenson; Cuba Vicente de Campo; Brazil |
| 1975 | Teófilo Stevenson; Cuba | Michael Dokes; United States | Trevor Berbick; Jamaica Jair de Campos; Brazil |
| 1979 | Teófilo Stevenson; Cuba | Narciso Maldonado; Puerto Rico | Rufus Hadley; United States Luis Castillo; Ecuador |
| 1983 | Aurelio Toyo; Cuba | Henry Tillman; United States | Virgilio Frias; Dominican Republic Alex Stewart; Jamaica |
| 1987 | Félix Savón; Cuba | Juan Antonio Díaz; Argentina | Domenico d'Amico; Canada Michael Bentt; United States |
| 1991 | Félix Savón; Cuba | Shannon Briggs; United States | Tom Glesby; Canada |
| 1995 | Félix Savón; Cuba | Lamon Brewster; United States | Moises Rolón; Puerto Rico Santiago Palavecino; Argentina |
| 1999 | Odlanier Solís; Cuba | Mark Simmons; Canada | Marcelino Novaes; Brazil Kerron Speid; Jamaica |
| 2003 | Odlanier Solís; Cuba | Kertson Manswell; Trinidad and Tobago | Jason Douglas; Canada Devin Vargas; United States |
| 2007 | Osmay Acosta; Cuba | José Payares; Venezuela | Rafael Lima; Brazil Jorge Quiñonez; Ecuador |
| 2011 | Lenier Peró; Cuba | Julio Castillo; Ecuador | Yamil Peralta; Argentina |
| 2011 | Lenier Peró; Cuba | Julio Castillo; Ecuador | Anderson Emmanuel; Barbados |
| 2015 | Erislandy Savón; Cuba | Deivi Julio; Colombia | Samir El-Mais; Canada |
| 2015 | Erislandy Savón; Cuba | Deivi Julio; Colombia | Miguel Veliz; Chile |
| 2019 | Erislandy Savón; Cuba | Julio Castillo; Ecuador | Abner Teixeira; Brazil |
| 2019 | Erislandy Savón; Cuba | Julio Castillo; Ecuador | José María Lúcar; Peru |

=== Super Heavyweight ===
- +91 kg (1983–)

| Games | Gold | Silver | Bronze |
|---|---|---|---|
| 1983 | Jorge Luis González; Cuba | Eloy Loaiza; Venezuela | Tyrell Biggs; United States |
| 1987 | Jorge Luis González; Cuba | Lennox Lewis; Canada | Carlos Barcelete; Brazil Riddick Bowe; United States |
| 1991 | Roberto Balado; Cuba | Harold Arroyo; Puerto Rico | Elio Ibarra; Argentina Terry Campbell; Canada |
| 1995 | Leonardo Martínez Fiz; Cuba | Jean-François Bergeron; Canada | Romulo Cuarez; Venezuela Lance Whitaker; United States |
| 1999 | Alexis Rubalcaba; Cuba | Davin King; United States | Claudio Silva; Brazil Manuel Azar; Argentina |
| 2003 | Jason Estrada; United States | Michel López Núñez; Cuba | Sébastian Ceballo; Argentina Victor Bisbal; Puerto Rico |
| 2007 | Robert Alfonso; Cuba | Óscar Rivas; Colombia | Didier Bence; Canada Antônio Nogueira; Brazil |
| 2011 | Ítalo Perea; Ecuador | Juan Hiracheta; Mexico | Isaia Mena; Colombia |
| 2011 | Ítalo Perea; Ecuador | Juan Hiracheta; Mexico | Gerardo Bisbal; Puerto Rico |
| 2015 | Lenier Peró; Cuba | Edgar Muñoz; Venezuela | Cam F. Awesome; United States |
| 2015 | Lenier Peró; Cuba | Edgar Muñoz; Venezuela | Rafael Lima; Brazil |
| 2019 | Dainier Peró; Cuba | Cristian Salcedo; Colombia | Richard Torrez; United States |
| 2019 | Dainier Peró; Cuba | Cristian Salcedo; Colombia | Ricardo Brown; Jamaica |

== Women's events ==
=== Flyweight ===
- 51 kg (2011–)

| Games | Gold | Silver | Bronze |
|---|---|---|---|
| 2011 | Mandy Bujold; Canada | Ingrit Valencia; Colombia | Pamela Benavidez; Argentina |
| 2011 | Mandy Bujold; Canada | Ingrit Valencia; Colombia | Karlha Magliocco; Venezuela |
| 2015 | Mandy Bujold; Canada | Marlen Esparza; United States | Monica Gonzalez; Puerto Rico |
| 2015 | Mandy Bujold; Canada | Marlen Esparza; United States | Ingrit Valencia; Colombia |
| 2019 | Ingrit Valencia; Colombia | Virginia Fuchs; United States | Irismar Cardozo; Venezuela |
| 2019 | Ingrit Valencia; Colombia | Virginia Fuchs; United States | Miguelina Hernández; Dominican Republic |

=== Featherweight ===
- 57 kg (2019–)

| Games | Gold | Silver | Bronze |
|---|---|---|---|
| 2019 | Leonela Sánchez; Argentina | Jucielen Romeu; Brazil | Yeni Arias; Colombia |
| 2019 | Leonela Sánchez; Argentina | Jucielen Romeu; Brazil | Yarisel Ramirez; United States |

=== Light welterweight ===
- 60 kg (2011–)

| Games | Gold | Silver | Bronze |
|---|---|---|---|
| 2011 | Kiria Tapia; Puerto Rico | Erika Cruz; Mexico | Sandra Bizier; Canada |
| 2011 | Kiria Tapia; Puerto Rico | Erika Cruz; Mexico | Adela Peralta; Argentina |
| 2015 | Caroline Veyre; Canada | Dayana Sánchez; Argentina | Victoria Torres; Mexico |
| 2015 | Caroline Veyre; Canada | Dayana Sánchez; Argentina | Mirquin Sena; Dominican Republic |
| 2019 | Beatriz Ferreira; Brazil | Dayana Sánchez; Argentina | Rashida Ellis; United States |
| 2019 | Beatriz Ferreira; Brazil | Dayana Sánchez; Argentina | Esmeralda Falcón; Mexico |

=== Welterweight ===
- 69 kg (2019–)

| Games | Gold | Silver | Bronze |
|---|---|---|---|
| 2019 | Oshae Jones; United States | Myriam Da Silva; Canada | Brianda Cruz; Mexico |
| 2019 | Oshae Jones; United States | Myriam Da Silva; Canada | María Moronta; Dominican Republic |

=== Middleweight ===
- 75 kg (2011–)

| Games | Gold | Silver | Bronze |
|---|---|---|---|
| 2011 | Mary Spencer; Canada | Yenebier Guillén; Dominican Republic | Roseli Feitosa; Brazil |
| 2011 | Mary Spencer; Canada | Yenebier Guillén; Dominican Republic | Alma Ibarra; Mexico |
| 2015 | Claressa Shields; United States | Yenebier Guillén; Dominican Republic | Ariane Fortin; Canada |
| 2015 | Claressa Shields; United States | Yenebier Guillén; Dominican Republic | Lucía Pérez; Argentina |
| 2019 | Naomi Graham; United States | Tammara Thibeault; Canada | Flávia Figueiredo; Brazil |
| 2019 | Naomi Graham; United States | Tammara Thibeault; Canada | Érika Pachito; Ecuador |
