= Boxing at the 1995 Pan American Games =

The Men's Boxing Tournament at the 1995 Pan American Games was held in Mar del Plata, Argentina from March 11 to March 27. It served as a qualification tournament for the 1996 Summer Olympics in Atlanta, Georgia. First and second place qualified for the Olympic tournament.

== Medal winners ==
Event	Gold	Silver	Bronze
Light Flyweight (– 48 kilograms)	Edgar Velásquez; Venezuela	Juan Ramírez; Cuba	Geovany Baca; Honduras Albert Guardado; United States
Flyweight (– 51 kilograms)	Joan Guzmán; Dominican Republic	Raúl González Sánchez; Cuba	José Luis López; Venezuela José Juan Cotto; Puerto Rico
Bantamweight (– 54 kilograms)	Juan Despaigne; Cuba	José Miguel Cotto; Puerto Rico	John Nolasco; Dominican Republic Claude Lambert; Canada
Featherweight (– 57 kilograms)	Arnaldo Mesa; Cuba	Alex Trujillo; Puerto Rico	Luis Ernesto José; Dominican Republic Cristian Rodríguez; Argentina
Lightweight (– 60 kilograms)	Julio González; Cuba	Acelino Freitas; Brazil	Francisco Osorio; Colombia Michael Strange; Canada
Light Welterweight (– 63.5 kilograms)	Walter Crucce; Argentina	Luis Deines Pérez; Puerto Rico	Héctor Vinent; Cuba Fernando Vargas; United States
Welterweight (– 67 kilograms)	David Reid; United States	Daniel Santos; Puerto Rico	Hercules Kyvelos; Canada Tomás Leyva; Guatemala
Light Middleweight (– 71 kilograms)	Alfredo Duvergel; Cuba	Derbys Álvarez; Venezuela	Kurt Sinette; Trinidad and Tobago Jason Smith; Canada
Middleweight (– 75 kilograms)	Ariel Hernández; Cuba	Ricardo Araneda; Chile	Jhon Arroyo; Colombia Ronald Simms; United States
Light Heavyweight (– 81 kilograms)	Antonio Tarver; United States	Thompson García; Ecuador	Edgardo Santos; Puerto Rico Gabriel Hernández; Dominican Republic
Heavyweight (– 91 kilograms)	Félix Savón; Cuba	Lamon Brewster; United States	Moises Rolón; Puerto Rico Santiago Palavecino; Argentina
Super Heavyweight (+ 91 kilograms)	Leonardo Martínez Fiz; Cuba	Jean-François Bergeron; Canada	Romulo Cuarez; Venezuela Lance Whitaker; United States

== Results ==
=== Light Flyweight (– 48 kg) ===
Round of 16
Guardado (USA)	9
Guimarães (BRA)	5
Lazarte (ARG)	7
Reyes (COL)	13

Quarterfinals
Figliomeni (CAN)	6
Baca (HON)	10
Martínez Tejada (MEX)	8
Velasquez (VEN)	12
Guardado (USA)	11
Reyes (COL)	6
Laureano (PUR)	13
Ramírez (CUB)	18

Semifinals
Baca (HON)	3
Velasquez (VEN)	28
Guardado (USA)	0
Ramírez (CUB)	5

Final
Velasquez (VEN)	11
Ramírez (CUB)	6

=== Flyweight (– 51 kg) ===
Round of 16
Cotto (PUR)	15
Angeles (HON)	11
Rivas (NCA)	11
Rossel (PER)	17
Morel (USA)	22
Roldán (COL)	2
González (CUB)	ab
Scott (CAN)	ab

Quarterfinals
Cotto (PUR)	20
Rossel (PER)	9
Morel (USA)	wo
González (CUB)	wo
López (VEN)	16
Rivero (ARG)	7
Castillo (MEX)	4
Guzmán (DOM)	21

Semifinals
Cotto (PUR)	0
González (CUB)	11
López (VEN)	5
Guzmán (DOM)	27

Final
González (CUB)	11
Guzmán (DOM)	16

=== Bantamweight (– 54 kg) ===
Round of 16
Navarro (USA)	10
Chacón (ARG)	5
Despaigne (CUB)	21
Martínez (PAN)	8

Quarterfinals
Nolasco (DOM)	9
Jiménez (MEX)	3
Verbel (COL)	20
Cotto (PUR)	25
Lambert (CAN)	14
Cardenas (PER)	6
Navarro (USA)	9
Despaigne (CUB)	11

Semifinals
Nolasco (DOM)	4
Cotto (PUR)	11
Lambert (CAN)	2
Despaigne (CUB)	9

Final
Cotto (PUR)	8
Despaigne (CUB)	20

=== Featherweight (– 57 kg) ===
Round of 16
Rodríguez (ARG)	11
Vargas (MEX)	4
Vazquez (PAN)	15
Léon (COL)	6
Valbuena (VEN)	RSC-1
Nieves (ISV)	RSC-1
Mesa (CUB)	18
Corrales (USA)	3

Quarterfinals
José (DOM)	10
Williams (CAN)	6
Thomas (BAR)	RSC-2
Trujillo (PUR)	RSC-2
Rodríguez (ARG)	10
Vazquez (PAN)	5
Valbuena (VEN)	2
Mesa (CUB)	7

Semifinals
José (DOM)	RSC-2
Trujillo (PUR)	RSC-2
Rodríguez (ARG)	3
Mesa (CUB)	8

Final
Trujillo (PUR)	2
Mesa (CUB)	12

=== Lightweight (– 60 kg) ===
Round of 16

Quarterfinals

Semifinals
Freitas (BRA)	8
Osorio (COL)	3
Mike Strange (CAN)	2
González (CUB)	13

Final
Freitas (BRA)	4
González (CUB)	6

=== Light Welterweight (– 63.5 kg) ===
Round of 16	Quarterfinals	Semifinals	Final
			Crucce (ARG)	13
			Deines Pérez (PUR)	7

=== Welterweight (– 67 kg) ===
Round of 16	Quarterfinals	Semifinals	Final
			Reid (USA)	+9
			Santos (PUR)	9

=== Light Middleweight (– 71 kg) ===
Round of 16	Quarterfinals	Semifinals	Final
			Álvarez (VEN)	0
			Duvergel (CUB)	19

=== Middleweight (– 75 kg) ===
Round of 16	Quarterfinals	Semifinals	Final
			Araneda (CHI)	0
			Hernández (CUB)	13

=== Light Heavyweight (– 81 kg) ===
Round of 16
Tarver (USA)	RSC-2
Amador (MEX)	—
Vega (CUB)	RSC-1
Amador (NCA)	—

Quarterfinals
Tarver (USA)	11
Vega (CUB)	10
Hernández (DOM)	9
Sotelo (ARG)	8
García (ECU)	11
Mosquera (COL)	8
Santos (PUR)	AB-1
Heit (CAN)	—

Semifinals
Tarver (USA)	RSC-1
Hernández (DOM)	—
García (ECU)	4
Santos (PUR)	2

Final
Tarver (USA)	RSCH-2
García (ECU)	—

=== Heavyweight (– 91 kg) ===
Round of 16

Quarterfinals
Savón (CUB)	KO-1
Lewis (ISV)	—
Alcántara (DOM)	3
Palavecino (ARG)	13
Brewster (USA)	12
Hinton (CAN)	3
Novaes (BRA)	2
Rolón (PUR)	20

Semifinals
Savón (CUB)	RSCH-2
Palavecino (ARG)	—
Brewster (USA)	RSCH-2
Rolón (PUR)	—

Final
Savón (CUB)	AB-2
Brewster (USA)	—

=== Super Heavyweight (+ 91 kg) ===
Quarterfinals
Whitaker (USA)	wo
Stewart (GRN)	wo
Arganaraz (ARG)	RSC-1
Martínez Fiz (CUB)	RSC-1

Semifinals
Whitaker (USA)	KO-1
Martínez Fiz (CUB)	KO-1
Suarez (VEN)	RSC-2
Bergeron (CAN)	RSC-2

Final
Martínez Fiz (CUB)	RSCH-2
Bergeron (CAN)	RSCH-2

Super heavyweight event of the 1995 Pan American Games was tarnished by the absence of Cuban legend Roberto Balado, the 1992 Olympic champion, who was winning only gold medals at all events since October 1990, and was one of the most probable finalists if participated, but died in a car crash a year prior to the event. He was substituted by Leonardo Martínez Fiz.

== Medal table ==
Place	Nation	Gold medal	Silver medal	Bronze medal	Total
1	Cuba	7	2	1	10
2	United States	2	1	4	7
3	Venezuela	1	1	2	4
4	Dominican Republic	1	0	3	4
5	Argentina	1	0	2	3
6	Puerto Rico	0	4	3	7
7	Canada	0	1	4	5
8	Brazil	0	1	0	1
8	Ecuador	0	1	0	1
8	Chile	0	1	0	1
11	Colombia	0	0	2	2
12	Guatemala	0	0	1	1
12	Honduras	0	0	1	1
12	Trinidad and Tobago	0	0	1	1
Total		12	12	24	48

== See also ==
- Boxing at the 1996 Summer Olympics
