= Boxing at the Pan American Games =

- No. of events: 15 (men: 10; women: 5)

Boxing has been contested at every Pan American Games since the first edition of the games in 1951. The 2007 Pan American Games was the final games with boxing as a male-only event. The 2011 Pan American Games included women's boxing in the program for the first time.

== Medal table ==
The following table is ranked by the number of golds, then silvers, then bronzes. At the 1951 games there the losing semi-finalists held a bronze medal playoff; since then, both losing semi-finalists have received bronze medals.

Updated after the 2023 Pan American Games.

Rank	Nation	Gold	Silver	Bronze	Total
1	Cuba	100	22	18	140
2	United States	37	37	51	125
3	Argentina	23	16	30	69
4	Brazil	12	27	40	79
5	Mexico	9	14	40	63
6	Puerto Rico	8	19	27	54
7	Venezuela	8	16	45	69
8	Canada	8	13	32	53
9	Dominican Republic	4	16	28	48
10	Colombia	4	12	17	33
11	Chile	2	9	9	20
12	Ecuador	1	6	11	18
13	Uruguay	1	1	6	8
14	Jamaica	0	2	9	11
15	Panama	0	2	3	5
16	Peru	0	2	2	4
17	Guyana	0	1	7	8
18	Trinidad and Tobago	0	1	3	4
19	Bahamas	0	1	0	1
20	Nicaragua	0	0	4	4
21	El Salvador	0	0	2	2
21	Guatemala	0	0	2	2
23	Antigua and Barbuda	0	0	1	1
23	Barbados	0	0	1	1
23	Costa Rica	0	0	1	1
23	Haiti	0	0	1	1
23	Honduras	0	0	1	1
Totals (27 entries)		217	217	391	825

== See also ==
- List of Pan American Games medalists in boxing
