= Puerto Rico at the 1995 Pan American Games =

- IOC code: PUR
- NOC: Puerto Rico Olympic Committee

in Mar del Plata 11–26 March 1995
- Medals Ranked 10th: Gold 1 Silver 9 Bronze 12 Total 22

Pan American Games appearances (overview)
- 1951; 1955; 1959; 1963; 1967; 1971; 1975; 1979; 1983; 1987; 1991; 1995; 1999; 2003; 2007; 2011; 2015; 2019; 2023

The 12th Pan American Games were held in Mar del Plata, Argentina from March 11 to March 26, 1995.

== Medals ==
=== Gold ===
===== Taekwondo =====
- Women's – 47 kg: Betsy Ortíz

=== Silver ===
===== Boxing =====
- Men's Bantamweight (– 54 kg): José Miguel Cotto
- Men's Featherweight (– 57 kg): Alex Trujillo
- Men's Light-Welterweight (– 63.5 kg): Luis Deines Pérez
- Men's Welterweight (– 67 kg): Daniel Santos

===== Gymnastics =====
- Men's Horizontal Bar: Victor Colon

===== Softball =====
- Women's Team Competition: Puerto Rico women's national softball team

===== Wrestling =====
- Men's Freestyle (– 62 kg): Anibal Nieves
- Men's Greco-Roman (– 82 kg): José Betancourt
- Men's Greco-Roman (– 130 kg): Edwin Millet

=== Bronze ===
===== Archery =====
- Women's Recurve 30 m: María Reyes

===== Athletics =====
- Men's Long Jump: Elmer Williams

===== Baseball =====
- Men's Team Competition: Puerto Rico national baseball team

===== Boxing =====
- Men's Flyweight (– 51 kg): José Juan Cotto
- Men's Light-Heavyweight (– 81 kg): Edgardo Santos
- Men's Heavyweight (– 91 kg): Moisés Rolón

===== Cycling =====
- Men's Points Race: Juán Merhed

===== Judo =====
- Women's Flyweight (– 45 kg): Evelyn Matías

===== Karate =====
- Men's Kumite (+ 80 kg): Otilio Cartagena
- Men's Kumite (Open Class): Eric Albino

===== Taekwondo =====
- Men's – 85 kg: Aníbal Cintrón

===== Weightlifting =====
- Men's 108 kg: Ramón Álvarez

== See also ==
- Puerto Rico at the 1996 Summer Olympics
