= Dominican Republic at the 1995 Pan American Games =

- IOC code: DOM
- NOC: Comité Olímpico Dominicano
- Website: www.colimdo.org

in Mar del Plata 11–26 March 1995
- Medals Ranked 13th: Gold 1 Silver 1 Bronze 5 Total 7

Pan American Games appearances (overview)
- 1951; 1955; 1959; 1963; 1967; 1971; 1975; 1979; 1983; 1987; 1991; 1995; 1999; 2003; 2007; 2011; 2015; 2019; 2023

The 12th Pan American Games were held in Mar del Plata, Argentina from March 11 to March 25, 1995.

== Medals ==
=== Gold ===
===== Boxing =====
- Men's Flyweight (– 51 kg): Joan Guzmán

=== Silver ===
===== Judo =====
- Men's Flyweight (– 56 kg): Luis Vizcaíno

=== Bronze ===
===== Boxing =====
- Men's Bantamweight (– 54 kg): John Nolasco
- Men's Featherweight (– 57 kg): Luis Ernesto José
- Men's Light Heavyweight (– 81 kg): Gabriel Hernández

===== Judo =====
- Women's Middleweight (– 66 kg): Dulce Piña

===== Taekwondo =====
- Men's Heavyweight (+ 83 kg): Julio Vázquez

== See also ==
- Dominican Republic at the 1996 Summer Olympics
