= Boxing at the 1959 Pan American Games =

Boxing at the I959 Pan American Games

The Men's Boxing Tournament at the 1959 Pan American Games was held in Chicago, United States, from August 27 to September 7.

== Medal winners ==
Event	Gold	Silver	Bronze
Flyweight (– 51 kilograms)	Miguel Angel Botta; Argentina	José Martins; Brazil	Tito Blanco; Venezuela
Bantamweight (– 54 kilograms)	Waldomiro Pinto; Brazil	Carlos Cañete; Argentina	Pete Spanakos; United States
Featherweight (– 57 kilograms)	Carlos Aro; Argentina	Charles Brown; United States	Mario Garate; Chile
Lightweight (– 60 kilograms)	Abel Laudonio; Argentina	Gualberto Gutiérrez; Uruguay	Mario Romero; Venezuela
Light Welterweight (– 63.5 kilograms)	Vincent Shomo; United States	Luis Aranda; Argentina	Humberto Dip; Mexico
Welterweight (– 67 kilograms)	Alfredo Cornejo; Chile	Aurelio González; Argentina	Manuel Alves; Brazil
Light Middleweight (– 71 kilograms)	Wilbert McClure; United States	José Burgos; Venezuela	Helio Crescencio; Brazil
Middleweight (– 75 kilograms)	Abrao de Souza; Brazil	Bob Foster; United States	Carl Crawford; British Guiana
Light Heavyweight (– 81 kilograms)	Amos Johnson; United States	Rafael Gargiulo; Argentina	Carlos Lucas; Chile
Heavyweight (+ 81 kilograms)	Allen Hudson; United States	Eduardo Corletti; Argentina	Jurandyr Nicolau; Brazil

== Medal table ==
Rank	Nation	Gold	Silver	Bronze	Total
1	United States (USA)	4	2	1	7
2	Argentina (ARG)	3	5	0	8
3	Brazil (BRA)	2	1	3	6
4	Chile (CHI)	1	0	2	3
5	Venezuela (VEN)	0	1	2	3
6	Uruguay (URU)	0	1	0	1
7	Guiana (BGU)	0	0	1	1
7	Mexico (MEX)	0	0	1	1
Totals (8 entries)		10	10	10	30
