= Shomo =

Shomo may refer to:

- Caleb Shomo (born 1992), lead vocalist of hardcore punk band Beartooth, the former lead vocalist, keyboardist of vintage crabcore/electronicore band Attack Attack! and the owner of Studio Records in Columbus, Ohio
- Vince Shomo (born 1940), American amateur light welterweight champion for 1957, 1958 and 1960. See list
- William A. Shomo or William Arthur "Bill" Shomo (1918–1990), United States Army Air Forces fighter pilot during World War II

== See also ==
- Adonai-Shomo, the name given to a commune which existed from 1861 to 1896 in Massachusetts, USA
- Shomo Rock, a nunatak lying between the Ricker Hills and Pape Rock in the Prince Albert Mountains, Oates Land, East Antarctica
