= Table tennis at the 1979 Pan American Games =

== Events ==
Event	Gold	Silver	Bronze
Men's singles	Eddie Lo; Canada	Mario Álvarez; Dominican Republic	Alex Polisois; Canada
Men's singles	Eddie Lo; Canada	Mario Álvarez; Dominican Republic	Raymundo Fermin; Dominican Republic
Women's singles	Mariann Domonkos; Canada	Faan Yeen Liu; United States	Diana Guillen; Mexico
Women's singles	Mariann Domonkos; Canada	Faan Yeen Liu; United States	Judy Bochenski; United States
Men's doubles	Canada; Eddie Lo; Alex Polisois	Dominican Republic; Mario Álvarez; Esteban Ortiz Gonzalo	Dominican Republic; Raymundo Fermin; Juan Vila
Men's doubles	Canada; Eddie Lo; Alex Polisois	Dominican Republic; Mario Álvarez; Esteban Ortiz Gonzalo	Ecuador; Gustavo Ripalda; Gustavo Ulloa
Women's doubles	Canada; Mariann Domonkos; Birute Plucas	United States; Judy Bochenski; Connie Sweeris	Colombia; Ana Uribe; Isabel Bastida
Women's doubles	Canada; Mariann Domonkos; Birute Plucas	United States; Judy Bochenski; Connie Sweeris	Cuba; Paquita Roman; Ailed Gonzalez
Mixed doubles	Canada; Alex Polisois; Mariann Domonkos	Mexico; Sergio Sanchez; Diana Guillen	Canada; Eddie Lo; Birute Plucas
Mixed doubles	Canada; Alex Polisois; Mariann Domonkos	Mexico; Sergio Sanchez; Diana Guillen	United States; Bui Quang Dang; Faan Yeen Liu
Men's team	Dominican Republic; Mario Álvarez; Raymundo Fermin; Esteban Ortiz; Juan Vila	United States; Quang Dang Bui; David Sakai; Dean Doyle; Todd Petersen	Canada; Eddie Lo; Alex Polisois
Women's team	Canada; Mariann Domonkos; Birute Plucas	United States; Faan Yeen Liu; Judy Bochenski; Connie Sweeris	Trinidad and Tobago; Nadira Abdool; Tara Hansrajsingh

== See also ==
- List of Pan American Games medalists in table tennis
