= Spanakos =

Spanakos is a Greek surname. Notable people with the surname include:

- Nick Spanakos (born 1938), American boxer
- Pete Spanakos (born 1938), American boxer, twin brother of Nick
