= José Martins =

José Martins may refer to:

- José Martins (boxer) (1931–1999), Brazilian Olympic boxer
- José Freitas Martins (born 1951), Portuguese cyclist
- José Saraiva Martins (born 1932), Portuguese cardinal of the Roman Catholic Church
- José Gouveia Martins (1930–2015), Portuguese football half-back
- José Martins (footballer, born 1906) (1906–1994), Portuguese football forward
