= Alfredo Cornejo =

Alfredo Cornejo may refer to:

- Alfredo Cornejo (boxer)
- Alfredo Cornejo (politician)
