= Peru at the 1991 Pan American Games =

Peru at the 1995 Pan American Games
- IOC code: PER
- NOC: Comité Olímpico Peruano
- Website: www.coperu.org

in Mar del Plata 11–26 March 1995
- Medals Ranked 23rd: Gold 0 Silver 0 Bronze 3 Total 3

Pan American Games appearances (overview)
- 1951; 1955; 1959; 1963; 1967; 1971; 1975; 1979; 1983; 1987; 1991; 1995; 1999; 2003; 2007; 2011; 2015; 2019; 2023

Peru participated in the 11th Pan American Games, which were held in Havana, Cuba from August 2 to August 18, 1991.

== See also ==
- Peru at the 1992 Summer Olympics
