= Ecuador at the 1995 Pan American Games =

- IOC code: ECU
- NOC: Comité Olímpico Ecuatoriano
- Website: www.coe.org.ec

in Mar del Plata 11–26 March 1995
- Medals Ranked 15th: Gold 1 Silver 1 Bronze 3 Total 5

Pan American Games appearances (overview)
- 1951; 1955; 1959; 1963; 1967; 1971; 1975; 1979; 1983; 1987; 1991; 1995; 1999; 2003; 2007; 2011; 2015; 2019; 2023; 2027

The 12th Pan American Games were held in Mar del Plata, Argentina from March 11 to March 26, 1995.

== Medals ==
=== Gold ===
===== Athletics =====
- Men's 20 km Road Walk: Jefferson Pérez

=== Silver ===
===== Boxing =====
- Men's Heavyweight (– 91 kg): Thompson García

=== Bronze ===
===== Athletics =====
- Men's 5,000 metres: Silvio Guerra

===== Weightlifting =====
- Men's Middleweight (– 76 kg): Walter Llerena (total)
- Men's Middleweight (– 76 kg): Walter Llerena (snatch)

== See also ==
- Ecuador at the 1996 Summer Olympics
