= Mariano Marquez =

Puerto Rican boxer

Personal information
- Born: April 22, 1968 (age 58) Río Piedras, Puerto Rico
Medal record
Men's Boxing
Representing Puerto Rico
Central American and Caribbean Games
Bronze medal – third place	1993 Ponce	Light Heavyweight

Mariano Marquez (born April 22, 1968 in Río Piedras, Puerto Rico) is a retired professional boxer from Puerto Rico.

== Career ==
As an amateur, Marquez represented his native country in the light heavyweight division (– 81 kg), winning a bronze medal at the 1993 Central American and Caribbean Games in Ponce, Puerto Rico. Rated as a middleweight he made his professional debut on 1995-10-28, defeating USA's Jorge Delgado in Philadelphia, Pennsylvania. He quit after 12 pro bouts (5 wins, 7 losses).
