= Boxing at the 1993 Central American and Caribbean Games =

Boxing competitions

The Boxing Tournament at the 1993 Central American and Caribbean Games was held in Ponce, Puerto Rico from November 20 to November 28, 1993.

== Medal winners ==
| Event | Gold | Silver | Bronze |
|---|---|---|---|
| Light Flyweight (– 48 kilograms) | Joan Guzmán (DOM) | José Laureano (PUR) | Maikro Romero (CUB); Javier Medina (NCA) |
| Flyweight (– 51 kilograms) | Manuel Mantilla (CUB) | Eidy Moya (VEN) | John Nolasco (DOM); Francisco Manuel Rivera (PUR) |
| Bantamweight (– 54 kilograms) | Daniel Regalado (CUB) | Alex Trujillo (PUR) | Gairy St. Clair (GUY); Wilson Fana Peña (DOM) |
| Featherweight (– 57 kilograms) | Enrique Carrion (CUB) | Armando Perez (PUR) | Hugo Lewis (GUY); David Sevilla (VEN) |
| Lightweight (– 60 kilograms) | Mario Kindelan (CUB) | Juan Gomez (PUR) | Fernando Colmenares (VEN); Marvin Simon (ANT) |
| Light Welterweight (– 63.5 kilograms) | Héctor Vinent (CUB) | Rogelio Martínez (DOM) | Carlos Saenz (COL); Albertano Caballero (MEX) |
| Welterweight (– 67 kilograms) | Juan Hernandez Sierra (CUB) | Erner Julio (COL) | Amador Acevedo (PUR); Christopher Henry (BAR) |
| Light Middleweight (– 71 kilograms) | Juan Carlos Lemus (CUB) | Alberto Zorilla (DOM) | José Luis Quinones (PUR); Ernest Barnes (CAY) |
| Middleweight (– 75 kilograms) | Ariel Hernandez (CUB) | Marvin Penniston John (TRI) | Carlos López (MEX); Joel Duncan (GUY) |
| Light Heavyweight (– 81 kilograms) | Dihosvany Vega (CUB) | Juan Charles Gimenez (DOM) | Manuel Verde (MEX); Mariano Marquez (PUR) |
| Heavyweight (– 91 kilograms) | Félix Savón (CUB) | Edgardo Santos (PUR) | Julian Skeete (GUY); Prince Wilks (JAM) |
| Super Heavyweight (+ 91 kilograms) | Roberto Balado (CUB) | Rómulo Suarez (VEN) | Aníbal Gonzalez (DOM); Terrence Poole (GUY) |
