= Dominican Republic at the 1991 Pan American Games =

- IOC code: DOM
- NOC: Comité Olímpico Dominicano
- Website: www.colimdo.org

in Havana 8–18 August 1991
- Medals Ranked 15th: Gold 0 Silver 5 Bronze 4 Total 9

Pan American Games appearances (overview)
- 1951; 1955; 1959; 1963; 1967; 1971; 1975; 1979; 1983; 1987; 1991; 1995; 1999; 2003; 2007; 2011; 2015; 2019; 2023

The 11th Pan American Games were held in Havana, Cuba from August 2 to August 18, 1991.

== Medals ==
=== Silver ===
===== Judo =====
- Men's Middleweight (– 86 kg): José Vera
- Women's Lightweight (– 56 kg): Altagracia Contreras

=== Bronze ===
===== Judo =====
- Women's Half Middleweight (– 61 kg): Eleucadia Vargas

===== Wrestling =====
- Men's Freestyle (– 48 kg): José Sabino
- Men's Greco-Roman (– 48 kg): José Sabino

== See also ==
- Dominican Republic at the 1992 Summer Olympics
