= Dominican Republic at the 1999 Pan American Games =

- IOC code: DOM
- NOC: Comité Olímpico Dominicano
- Website: www.colimdo.org

in Winnipeg 23 July – 8 August 1999
- Competitors: 158 (107 men and 51 women)
- Medals Ranked 14th: Gold 1 Silver 3 Bronze 5 Total 9

Pan American Games appearances (overview)
- 1951; 1955; 1959; 1963; 1967; 1971; 1975; 1979; 1983; 1987; 1991; 1995; 1999; 2003; 2007; 2011; 2015; 2019; 2023

The 13th Pan American Games were held in Winnipeg, Manitoba, Canada from July 23, 1999 to August 8, 1999.

== Medals ==
=== Gold ===
===== Weightlifting =====
- Women's Heavyweight (– 75 kg): Wanda Rijo

=== Silver ===
===== Weightlifting =====
- Women's Light-Heavyweight (– 69 kg): Miosotis Heredia

===== Karate =====
- Women's Kumite (+ 60 kg): Katty Acevedo

===== Taekwondo =====
- Men's Lightweight (– 68 kg): Luis Benítez

=== Bronze ===
===== Judo =====
- Men's Extra-Lightweight (– 60 kg): Juan Jacinto
- Women's Half-Middleweight (– 63 kg): Eleucadia Vargas

===== Taekwondo =====
- Men's Heavyweight (+ 80 kg): Danny Vizcaino

===== Weightlifting =====
- Women's Middleweight (– 63 kg): Sención Quezada
- Women's Flyweight (– 48 kg): Guillermina Candelario

== See also ==
- Dominican Republic at the 2000 Summer Olympics
