= Rogelio Martínez (boxer) =

Dominican Republic boxer (born 1974)

Personal information
- Born: 16 July 1974 (age 51) Cotuí, Dominican Republic
Medal record
Men's Boxing
Representing the Dominican Republic
Central American and Caribbean Games
Silver medal – second place	1993 Ponce	Light Welterweight

Rogelio Martínez (born 16 July 1974) is a Dominican Republic former professional boxer, who was nicknamed "The Golden Warrior" during his career.

As an amateur, Martínez represented his native country in the light welterweight division (– 63.5 kg), winning a silver medal at the 1993 Central American and Caribbean Games in Ponce, Puerto Rico. Rated as a middleweight he made his professional debut on 24 April 1997, defeating USA's Darrell Jacobs in Philadelphia, Pennsylvania. He retired after 19 pro bouts (13 wins, 5 losses and 1 draw).
