= Alex Polisois =

Canadian table tennis player

Personal information
- Nationality: Canada
- Born: January 19, 1957 (age 69)

Sport
- Sport: Table tennis
Medal record
Men's table tennis
Representing Canada
Pan American Games
Gold medal – first place	1979 San Juan	Doubles
Gold medal – first place	1979 San Juan	Mixed doubles
Bronze medal – third place	1979 San Juan	Singles
Bronze medal – third place	1979 San Juan	Team

Alex Polisois (born January 19, 1957) is a Canadian table tennis player.
