= Eddie Lo =

Chinese-Canadian table tennis player

Eddie (Ed) Lo
Personal information
- Full name: Ed Lo
- Nationality: Canada
- Born: April 1959 (age 67) B.C., Canada

Sport
- Sport: Table tennis
- Playing style: Penhold
Medal record
Men's table tennis
Representing Canada
Pan American Games
Gold medal – first place	1979 San Juan	Singles
Gold medal – first place	1979 San Juan	Doubles
Bronze medal – third place	1979 San Juan	Mixed doubles
Bronze medal – third place	1979 San Juan	Team

Eddie (Ed) Lo is a Chinese-Canadian table tennis player.
