= Peru at the 1995 Pan American Games =

- IOC code: PER
- NOC: Comité Olímpico Peruano
- Website: www.coperu.org

in Mar del Plata 11–26 March 1995
- Medals Ranked 16th: Gold 0 Silver 3 Bronze 4 Total 7

Pan American Games appearances (overview)
- 1951; 1955; 1959; 1963; 1967; 1971; 1975; 1979; 1983; 1987; 1991; 1995; 1999; 2003; 2007; 2011; 2015; 2019; 2023; 2027

The 12th Pan American Games were held in Mar del Plata, Argentina from March 11 to March 25, 1995.

== Medals ==
=== Bronze ===
===== Taekwondo =====
- Women's Middleweight (– 70 kg): Ursula Guimet

== See also ==
- Peru at the 1996 Summer Olympics
