= 1995 Pan American Games medal table =

- Location: Mar del Plata, Argentina

Highlights
- Most gold medals: United States (170)
- Most total medals: United States (425)

The 1995 Pan American Games, officially known as the XII Pan American Games, were a continental multi-sport event held in Mar del Plata, Argentina, from March 11 to March 26, 1995. At the Games, 5,144 athletes selected from 42 National Olympic Committees (NOCs) participated in events in 34 sports. Thirty-one nations earned medals during the competition, and fifteen won at least one gold medal.

== Medal table ==
The ranking in this table is based on medal counts published by several media organizations. By default, the table is ordered by the number of gold medals won by the athletes representing a nation. (In this context, a nation is an entity represented by a NOC). The number of silver medals is taken into consideration next and then the number of bronze medals. If nations are still tied, equal ranking is given and they are listed alphabetically by IOC country code.

To sort this table by nation, total medal count, or any other column, click on the icon next to the column title.

* Host nation (Argentina)

Rank	Nation	Gold	Silver	Bronze	Total
1	United States^{a}	170	145	110	425
2	Cuba	112	66	60	238
3	Canada	47	61	69	177
4	Argentina*	40	45	74	159
5	Mexico	23	20	37	80
6	Brazil	18	27	38	83
7	Venezuela	9	14	25	48
8	Colombia	5	15	28	48
9	Chile	2	6	11	19
10	Puerto Rico	1	9	12	22
11	Uruguay	1	4	3	8
12	Guatemala	1	1	6	8
13	Dominican Republic	1	1	5	7
14	Netherlands Antilles	1	1	4	6
15	Ecuador	1	1	3	5
16	Peru	0	3	4	7
17	Virgin Islands	0	3	0	3
18	Jamaica	0	2	2	4
18	Nicaragua	0	2	2	4
20	Bahamas	0	2	1	3
21	Paraguay	0	1	2	3
22	Costa Rica	0	1	1	2
23	Dominica	0	1	0	1
23	El Salvador	0	1	0	1
23	Panama	0	1	0	1
26	Trinidad and Tobago	0	0	6	6
27	Honduras	0	0	2	2
27	Suriname	0	0	2	2
29	Antigua and Barbuda	0	0	1	1
29	Bermuda	0	0	1	1
29	Saint Vincent and the Grenadines	0	0	1	1
Totals (31 entries)		432	433	510	1,375

== Notes ==
- ^a Some sources point out that the United States earned 124 silver medals, instead of 125. This would result in a total of 424 medals for the nation.
- ^b Therefore, according to some sources, 432 silver medals were awarded during the Games, instead of 433. This would result in a total number of 1,372 medals awarded.
