= Gualberto Gutiérrez =

Uruguayan boxer (1940–2023)

Personal information
- Born: 25 January 1940 Cardona, Uruguay
- Died: 25 September 2023 (aged 83) Sydney, Australia

Sport
- Sport: Boxing
Medal record
Men's amateur boxing
Representing Uruguay
Pan American Games
Silver medal – second place	1959 Chicago	Lightweight

Gualberto Gutiérrez (25 January 1940 – 26 September 2023) was a Uruguayan boxer. He competed in the men's lightweight event at the 1960 Summer Olympics, where he lost to Eddie Blay of Ghana.
