= José Laureano =

Puerto Rican boxer

Personal information
- Born: November 6, 1972 (age 53) Vega Baja, Puerto Rico
Medal record
Men's Boxing
Representing Puerto Rico
Central American and Caribbean Games
| Silver medal – second place | 1993 Ponce | Light Flyweight |

José Laureano (born 1972-11-06) is a retired professional boxer from Puerto Rico. As an amateur, he represented his native country in the light flyweight division (– 48 kg), winning a silver medal at the 1993 Central American and Caribbean Games in Ponce, Puerto Rico. Rated as a bantamweight he made his professional debut on 1994-02-26, defeating compatriot Rafael Colón in Guaynabo, Puerto Rico. He quit after 34 pro bouts (18 wins, 15 losses and 1 draw).
