= Aurelio González (boxer) =

Argentine boxer (born 1939)

Personal information
- Born: 16 January 1939 (age 87) Buenos Aires, Argentina

Sport
- Sport: Boxing
Medal record
Men's amateur boxing
Representing Argentina
Pan American Games
Silver medal – second place	1959 Chicago	Welterweight

Aurelio González (born 16 January 1939) is an Argentine boxer. He competed in the men's welterweight event at the 1960 Summer Olympics.
