= Julio González (Cuban boxer) =

Cuban boxer (born 1961)

Personal information
- Born: 7 January 1961 (age 65) Cienfuegos, Cuba

Sport
- Sport: Boxing
Medal record
Representing Cuba
World Championships
Gold medal – first place	1989 Moscow	Lightweight
Pan American Games
Gold medal – first place	1987 Indianapolis	Lightweight
Gold medal – first place	1991 Havana	Lightweight
Gold medal – first place	1995 Mar del Plata	Lightweight
Central American and Caribbean Games
Gold medal – first place	1986 Santiago	Lightweight
Gold medal – first place	1990 Mexico City	Lightweight

Julio González Valladares (born 7 January 1961) is a Cuban boxer. He competed at the 1992 Summer Olympics and the 1996 Summer Olympics.
