= Cristian Rodríguez (boxer) =

Argentine boxer (born 1973)

Personal information
- Full name: Manuel Cristian Rodríguez
- Born: 27 June 1973 (age 52) San Isidro, Buenos Aires
Medal record
Men's boxing
Representing Argentina
Pan American Games
Bronze medal – third place	1995 Mar del Plata	Featherweight

Manuel Cristian Rodríguez (born 27 June 1973 in San Isidro, Buenos Aires) is a retired professional boxer from Argentina. As an amateur, Rodríguez represented his native country in the featherweight division (57 kg), winning a bronze medal at the 1995 Pan American Games in Mar del Plata, Argentina. Rated as a lightweight he made his professional debut in August 1996, defeating compatriot Roberto Rivademar. He quit after eight pro bouts (6 wins, 1 loss and 1 draw).
