= Hercules Kyvelos =

Canadian boxer

Personal information
- Nickname: The God
- Nationality: (Canada) Canadian
- Born: Hercules Kyvelos; February 25, 1975 (age 51) Montreal, Quebec
- Height: 1.77 m (5 ft 10 in)
- Weight: Middleweight; Light Middleweight; Welterweight

Boxing career
- Reach: 72 in (183 cm)
- Stance: Orthodox

Boxing record
- Total fights: 27
- Wins: 24
- Win by KO: 12
- Losses: 3
- Draws: 0
- No contests: 0
Medal record
Representing Canada
Pan American Games
Bronze medal – third place	1995 Mar del Plata	Welterweight

Hercules Kyvelos (born February 25, 1975) is a Canadian boxer in the Welterweight division and is the former Canadian Welterweight Champion. He fought at the 1996 Summer Olympics in Atlanta, Georgia.

== Early life ==
Hercules was born in Canada but he has Greek roots.

== Amateur career ==
He represented his native country at the 1996 Summer Olympics in Atlanta, Georgia. A year before, Kyvelos won the bronze medal at the 1995 Pan American Games in Mar del Plata, Argentina. He also twice won the National Canadian Golden Gloves.

== Pro career ==
After the Atlanta Games he became a professional boxer, winning his debut against Ryan Jones by first-round knockout.

In February 2000, Hercules won the Canadian Welterweight Championship by defeating fellow countryman Fitz Vanderpool.

=== WBO Welterweight Championship ===
On January 31, 2004, Kyvelos lost for the first time as a professional, when he faced WBO Welterweight Champion, American Antonio Margarito in Phoenix, Arizona. He lost by a second-round knockout.

In his next fight he was also stopped by knockout against Mexican Cosme Rivera, the fight was an IBF Welterweight Title Eliminator.

=== Personal life ===
As of 2007, Hercules is retired from boxing and is working as a real estate agent in Montreal.
