= Jason Smith (boxer) =

Canadian boxer

Personal information
- Born: September 4, 1973 (age 52) Edmonton, Canada

Sport
- Sport: Boxing
Medal record
Representing Canada
Pan American Games
Bronze medal – third place	1995 Mar del Plata	Light middleweight

Jason Smith (born September 4, 1973) is a retired male Canadian boxing champion. Smith placed third in the 1995 Pan American Games and won a bronze medal in the men's light middleweight division (- 71 kg).
