= Hélio Crescêncio =

Brazilian boxer (1933–2017)

Personal information
- Born: 2 January 1933 Rio de Janeiro, Brazil
- Died: 17 August 2017 (aged 84) Rio de Janeiro, Brazil

Sport
- Sport: Boxing
Medal record
Men's amateur boxing
Representing Brazil
Pan American Games
Bronze medal – third place	1959 Chicago	Light middleweight

Hélio Crescêncio (2 January 1933 – 17 August 2017) was a Brazilian boxer. He competed in the men's light middleweight event at the 1960 Summer Olympics. Crescêncio died in Rio de Janeiro on 17 August 2017, at the age of 84.
