= Claude Lambert =

Canadian boxer

Personal information
- Born: February 16, 1969 (age 57) Montreal, Quebec
Medal record
Men's Boxing
Representing Canada
Pan American Games
Bronze medal – third place	1995 Mar del Plata	Bantamweight

Claude Lambert (born February 16, 1969, in Montreal, Quebec) is a retired boxer from Canada, who competed in the bantamweight (< 54 kg) division at the 1996 Summer Olympics in Atlanta, Georgia. There he was stopped in the first round by Thailand's Vichairachanon Khadpo (the eventual bronze medalist). A year earlier, he had captured the bronze medal himself at the Pan American Games in Mar del Plata, Argentina. He also represented Canada at the 1994 Commonwealth Games.
