= Nick Spanakos =

American boxer

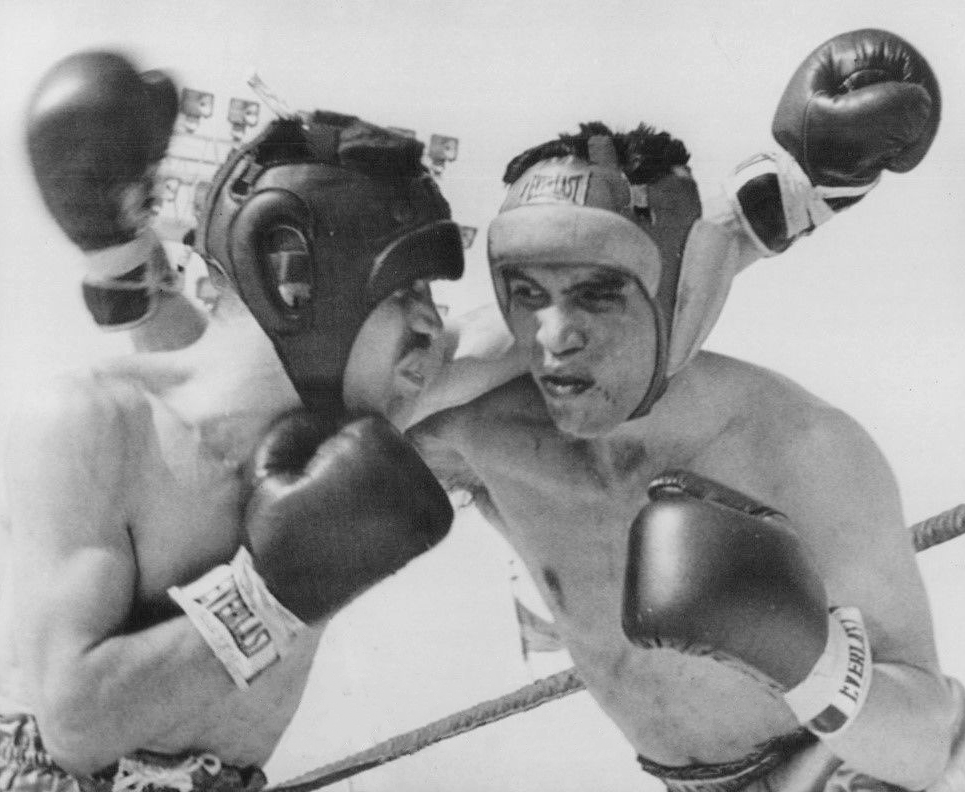
- Spanakos (left) in 1964

Personal information
- Born: July 26, 1938 (age 88)
- Height: 161 cm (5 ft 3 in)
- Weight: 56 kg (123 lb)

Sport
- Sport: Boxing
- Club: Elk's Club

Nikos Michaelis Spanakos (born July 26, 1938) is a retired American featherweight boxer. He competed at the 1960 Olympics, where he was eliminated in the first bout. He also attempted to qualify for the 1964 Tokyo Games. In 1967 he fought one professional bout and won. His twin brother Pete is also a retired competitive boxer.

Spanakos twins were born in a Greek family to Michael and Stella Spanakos. They had five brothers and attended the College of Idaho. Nick held a PhD in business administration and for 26 years taught at the City University of New York. He first married at the age of 73, to Barbara Stamatopoulou.
