= List of United States national amateur boxing light welterweight champions =

Below is a list of National Amateur Boxing Welterweight Champions, also known as United States Amateur Champions, along with the state or region which they represented. The United States National Boxing Championships bestow the title of United States Amateur Champion on amateur boxers for winning the annual national amateur boxing tournament organized by USA Boxing, the national governing body for Olympic boxing and is the United States' member organization of the International Amateur Boxing Association (AIBA). It is one of four premier amateur boxing tournaments, the others being the National Golden Gloves Tournament, which crowns its own amateur light welterweight champion, the Police Athletic League Tournament, and the United States Armed Forces Tournament, all sending champions to the US Olympic Trials. It was contested at 139lbs until 2002 when it was changed to 141lbs.

- 1952 - Isaac Vaughn, Cleveland, OH
- 1953 - J. Curet Alvarez, Puerto Rico
- 1954 - Bobby Shell, New York, NY
- 1955 - Robert Cofer, Philadelphia, PA
- 1956 - Tommy Thomas, Portland, OR
- 1957 - Vince Shomo, New York, NY
- 1958 - Vince Shomo, New York, NY
- 1959 - Brian O'Shea, Chicago, IL
- 1960 - Vince Shomo, New York, NY
- 1961 - J. Caldwell, Shawano, WI
- 1962 - Jackie Range, Nashville, TN
- 1963 - Harold Finley, South Africa
- 1964 - Freddie Ward, Portland, OR
- 1965 - Ray Garay, Houston, TX
- 1966 - Jim Wallington, US Army
- 1967 - Jim Wallington, US Army
- 1968 - Joe Louis Valdez, Houston, TX
- 1969 - Rudy Bolds, Pittsburgh, PA
- 1970 - Quincy Daniel, US Navy
- 1971 - Ray Seales, Tacoma, WA
- 1972 - Carlos Palomino, Westminster, CA
- 1973 - Randy Shields, Los Angeles, CA
- 1974 - Ray Leonard, Palmer Park, MD
- 1975 - Ray Leonard, Palmer Park, MD
- 1976 - Milton Seward, Columbus, OH
- 1977 - Thomas Hearns, Detroit, MI
- 1978 - Donald Curry, Fort Worth, TX
- 1979 - Lemuel Steeples, St. Louis, MO
- 1980 - Johnny Bumphus, Nashville, TN
- 1981 - James Mitchell, US Army
- 1982 - Henry Hughes, Cleveland, OH
- 1983 - Henry Hughes, Cleveland, OH
- 1984 - Elvis Yero, Miami Beach, FL
- 1985 - Nick Kakouris, St. Louis, MO
- 1986 - Nick Kakouris, St. Louis, MO
- 1987 - Nick Kakouris, St. Louis, MO
- 1988 - Todd Foster, Great Falls, MT
- 1989 - Ray Lovato, Sacramento, CA
- 1990 - Stevie Johnston, Denver, CO
- 1991 - Vernon Forrest, Augusta, GA
- 1992 - Shane Mosley, Pomona, CA
- 1993 - Lupe Sauzo, Tucson, AZ
- 1994 - Fareed Samad, Fort Bragg, NC
- 1995 - Arturo Ramos, San Antonio, TX
- 1996 - Hector Camacho, Jr., Orlando, FL
- 1997 - Keith Kemp, Cincinnati, OH
- 1999 - Ricardo Williams, Jr., Cincinnati, OH
- 1999 - Ricardo Williams, Jr., Cincinnati, OH
- 2000 - Anthony Thompson, Philadelphia, PA
- 2001 - Rock Allen, Philadelphia, PA
- 2002 - Rock Allen, Philadelphia, PA
- 2003 - Lamont Peterson, Washington, DC
- 2004 - Devon Alexander, St. Louis, MO
- 2005 - Karl Dargan, Philadelphia, PA
- 2006 - Karl Dargan, Philadelphia, PA
- 2007 - Javier Molina, Commerce, CA
- 2008 - Danny O'Connor, Framingham, MA
- 2009 - Frankie Gomez, Los Angeles, CA
- 2010 - Pedro Sosa, Bronx, NY
- 2011 - Semajay Thomas, Chicago, IL
- 2012 - Jamel Herring, Coram, NY/United States Marine Corps.
- 2014 - Andrew Kabangai, Philadelphia, PA
- 2019 - Jameel Fields-Carr, Omaha, Ne
