= Francisco Osorio =

Colombian boxer (born 1975)

Personal information
- Born: November 15, 1975 (age 50)
Medal record
Men's Boxing
Representing Colombia
Pan American Games
| Bronze medal – third place | 1995 Mar del Plata | Lightweight |

Francisco Ruben Osorio Gary (born November 15, 1975, in Barranquilla) is a welterweight boxer from Colombia, who won the bronze medal at the 1995 Pan American Games in Mar del Plata, Argentina. Nicknamed Flash he made his professional debut on March 21, 1997, when he was defeated by countryman Roberto Ortega.
