= Geovany Baca =

Honduran boxer (born 1971)

Geovanny Baca
Personal information
- Full name: Geovanny Óscar Baca Oliva
- Nationality: Honduras
- Born: March 5, 1971 (age 55)
- Height: 1.66 m (5 ft 5 1/2 in)
- Weight: 48 kg (106 lb)

Sport
- Sport: Boxing
- Weight class: Light Flyweight
Medal record
Pan American Games
Bronze medal – third place	1995 Mar del Plata	Light Flyweight

Geovanny Óscar Baca Oliva (born 5 March 1971) is a Honduran retired boxer. He competed at the 1995 Pan American Games representing Honduras and won the bronze medal in the men's light flyweight division after reaching the semifinals. He was also selected to compete for Honduras at the 1996 Summer Olympics in the men's light flyweight division. There, he placed equal 17th with 13 other competitors.

== Biography ==
Geovanny Óscar Baca Oliva was born on 5 March 1971. As an athlete, he competed for Honduras in international competition.

Baca competed at the 1995 Pan American Games held in Mar del Plata, Argentina, in the boxing competitions. There, he competed in the men's light flyweight division for competitors that weigh 48 kilograms (106 lb) or less. He received a Bye in the Round of 16 and immediately went to the quarterfinals of the event. In the quarterfinals, he went up against Domenic Figliomeni of Canada and won 6 to 10, advancing to the semifinals. In the semifinals, Baca went up against Édgar Velásquez and lost 3 to 28. Baca won the bronze medal in the event while Velásquez eventually won the gold medal in the final bout against Juan Ramírez.

Baca was later selected to compete for Honduras at the 1996 Summer Olympics held in Atlanta, United States. At the 1996 Summer Games, he was entered into one event, the men's light flyweight division. He competed in the first round of the event on 21 July 1996 in the seventh match against Anicet Rasonnaivo of Madagascar. There, Baca lost per the judge's decision and did not advance to the second round held five days later. Overall, he placed equal 17th with 13 other competitors in the event.
