= Wiley Johnson =

American farmer and political leader

Wiley W. Johnson was a farmer, shoemaker and political leader during the Reconstruction era in Texas. He served as a delegate to the 1868–1869 Texas Constitutional Convention. He and other 19th-century African American political leaders in Texas are commemorated on a memorial in Austin, Texas.

He was born in Arkansas c. 1841.

He and Mitchell Kendall represented Harrison County. They were among the eleven African Americans who served in the 1868–1869 Texas Constitutional Convention. He was one of the candidates supported by the Union League.
