= Ricardo Araneda =

Chilean boxer (born 1971)

Medal record
Men's Boxing
Representing Chile
Pan American Games
Silver medal – second place	1995 Mar del Plata	Middleweight

Ricardo Anibal Araneda Aviles (born 3 January 1971 in Valdivia, Los Ríos Region) is a Chilean former professional boxer who competed from 2004 to 2005. As an amateur, he won a silver medal at the 1995 Pan American Games in Mar del Plata, Argentina and represented his native country at the 1996 Summer Olympics, where he lost in the first round. Araneda made his professional debut on May 7, 2004 in Santiago de Chile, defeating countryman Juan Reyes.
