= Santiago Palavecino =

Argentine boxer

Personal information
- Full name: Santiago Felipe Palavecino
- Nationality: Argentina
- Born: November 13, 1974 (age 51) Buenos Aires

Sport
- Sport: Boxing
- Weight class: Heavyweight
Medal record
Pan American Games
Bronze medal – third place	1995 Mar del Plata	Heavyweight

Santiago Palavecino (born November 13, 1974, in Buenos Aires) is a retired male boxer from Argentina, who won the bronze medal in the men's heavyweight (– 91 kg) category at the 1995 Pan American Games in Mar del Plata. In the semi-finals he lost to Cuba's eventual gold medalist Félix Savón. Palavecino made his professional debut on 1999-02-26 defeating Pablo Beckmann on points.
