= Alfredo Cornejo (boxer) =

Chilean boxer (1933–2021)

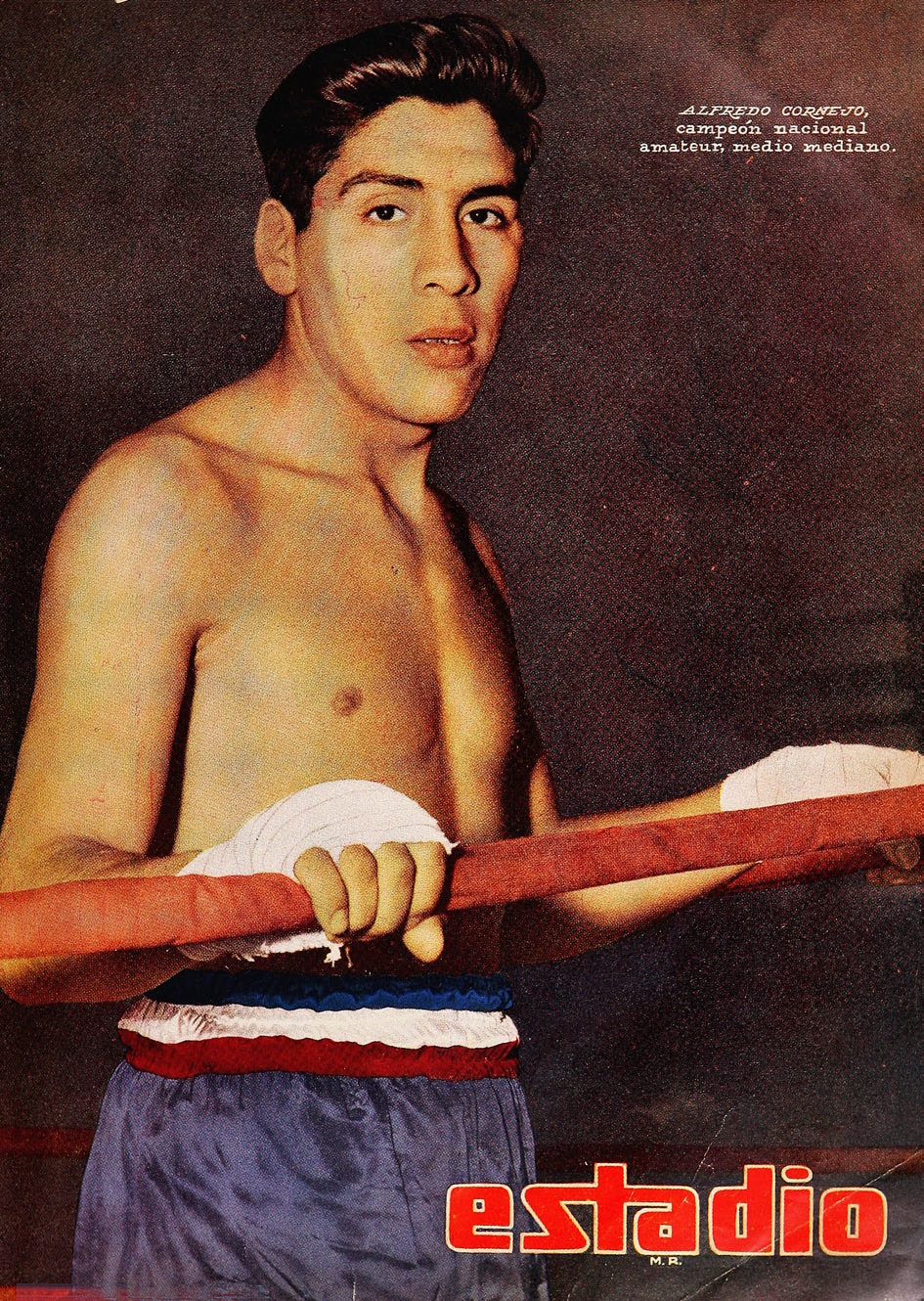

Personal information
- Full name: Alfredo Cornejo Cuevas
- Born: June 6, 1933 Santiago de Chile, Chile
- Died: August 15, 2021 (aged 88)
Medal record
Men's Boxing
Representing Chile
Pan American Games
Gold medal – first place	1959 Chicago	Welterweight

Alfredo Cornejo Cuevas (June 6, 1933 – August 15, 2021) was a Chilean boxer, who won the gold medal in the welterweight division at the 1959 Pan American Games in Chicago, United States. In the same year he also won the world amateur welterweight title in Mexico City. He later fought four professional fights from 1961 to 1962. As an amateur, he was three times South American Champion; as a light welterweight in Montevideo, Uruguay, 1956, and in Santiago, Chile, 1957, and as a welterweight, in Lima, Peru, 1958. He also competed in the men's welterweight event at the 1960 Summer Olympics.
