= Edgardo Santos =

Puerto Rican boxer

Personal information
- Born: May 6, 1970 (age 56) Carolina, Puerto Rico
Medal record
Men's Boxing
Representing Puerto Rico
Pan American Games
Bronze medal – third place	1995 Mar del Plata	Light-Heavyweight
Central American and Caribbean Games
Silver medal – second place	1993 Ponce	Heavyweight

Edgardo Santos (born May 6, 1970 in Carolina, Puerto Rico) is a retired Puerto Rican professional boxer. As an amateur, Santos represented Puerto Rico in the light-heavyweight division (– 81 kg), winning a bronze medal at the 1995 Pan American Games in Mar del Plata, Argentina. He made his professional debut at cruiserweight level in December 2002. He lost the debut bout to Argentina's Víctor Gimenez and retired from the sport after six fights, having just one win to his name after 4 losses and a draw.
