= Alex Trujillo =

Puerto Rican boxer

Personal information
- Nickname: Alexander the Great
- Born: Alexander Trujillo; August 28, 1974 (age 51) San Juan, Puerto Rico
- Height: 5 ft 9 in (1.75 m)
- Weight: Light welterweight Lightweight

Boxing career
- Reach: 68 in (170 cm)
- Stance: Orthodox

Boxing record
- Total fights: 26
- Wins: 23
- Win by KO: 17
- Losses: 2
- Draws: 1
Medal record
Men's Boxing
Representing Puerto Rico
Pan American Games
Silver medal – second place	1995 Mar del Plata	Featherweight
Central American and Caribbean Games
Silver medal – second place	1993 Ponce	Bantamweight

Alexander Trujillo (born August 28, 1974) is a retired professional boxer from Puerto Rico, who was nicknamed "Alexander the Great" during his career.

== Professional career ==
As a professional, he was the IBA world super lightweight champion. The IBA was a sanctioning group without much international recognition.

== Professional boxing record ==
26 fights	23 wins	2 losses
By knockout	17	0
By decision	5	2
By disqualification	1	0
Draws	1	
