= José Martins (boxer) =

Brazilian boxer (1931–1999)

Personal information
- Full name: José Neves Martins
- Born: 5 August 1931 São Paulo, Brazil
- Died: 10 November 1999 (aged 68) São Paulo, Brazil

Sport
- Sport: Boxing
Medal record
Men's amateur boxing
Representing Brazil
Pan American Games
Silver medal – second place	1959 Chicago	Flyweight

José Neves Martins (5 August 1931 – 10 November 1999), also known as Piccinin, was a Brazilian boxer. He competed in the men's flyweight event at the 1960 Summer Olympics. At the 1960 Summer Olympics in Rome, he lost to Mircea Dobrescu of Romania in the Round of 32. Martins died in São Paulo on 10 November 1999, at the age of 68.
