= Édgar Velásquez =

Venezuelan boxer (born 1974)

Edgar Velasquez
Personal information
- Full name: Edgar Velasquez
- Nicknames: "Plaga Loca" and "Kokusai"
- Nationality: Venezuela
- Born: April 3, 1974 (age 52) Tucupita, Venezuela

Sport
- Sport: Boxing
- Weight class: Light flyweight
Medal record
Pan American Games
Gold medal – first place	1995 Mar del Plata	Light flyweight

Edgar Velásquez (born 3 April 1974 in Tucupita) is a retired boxer from Venezuela. He competed in the men's light flyweight (– 48 kg) division during the early 1990s.

Velasquez is best known for having won the gold medal as an amateur in his weight category at the 1995 Pan American Games in Mar del Plata, Argentina. He made his professional debut on November 27, 1996, defeating Juanito Rubillar in the Korakuen Hall in Tokyo, Japan.
