= José Cotto =

Puerto Rican boxer (born 1977)

José Miguel Cotto
Personal information
- Nationality: Puerto Rican
- Born: José Miguel Cotto Vázquez; June 22, 1977 (age 49) Caguas, Puerto Rico
- Height: 5 ft 5.5 in (1.66 m)
- Weight: Super bantamweight Featherweight; Super featherweight Lightweight; Light welterweight Welterweight; Light middleweight

Boxing career
- Stance: Orthodox

Boxing record
- Total fights: 38
- Wins: 33
- Win by KO: 24
- Losses: 4
- Draws: 1
Medal record
Men's boxing
Representing Puerto Rico
Pan American Games
Silver medal – second place	1995 Mar del Plata	Bantamweight

José Miguel Cotto Vázquez (born June 22, 1977) is a Puerto Rican professional boxer and a four-time regional level champion. He is the brother of six-time world boxing champion Miguel Cotto and the cousin of lightweight contender Abner Cotto.

== Amateur career ==
In 1995, as an amateur, he participated at the Pan American Games in Mar del Plata, Argentina, and won a silver medal. A year later, he represented his native country at the 1996 Summer Olympics, where he was defeated in the first round.

== Pro career ==
He won the WBC Youth World super bantamweight title on August 20, 2000, a split decision win against a capable young Fernando Velardez (who would later fight Mexican legend Erik Morales for Morales' WBC Featherweight title).

On July 25, 2003, Cotto was supposed to fight in Phoenix, Arizona. However, his opponent had trouble getting a license to fight, as he had been knocked out recently and was serving a 45-day suspension from another state. The Arizona boxing commission was unable to find Cotto an opponent in time, and the fight got cancelled.

On September 9, at his native Caguas, Cotto finally returned to action, with a first-round knockout win over Johnny Walker. On December 19, he fought Anthony Martinez in Aibonito, winning by an eighth-round knockout.

Cotto moved to Phoenix early in 2004. On April 14 of that year, he stopped Mexican Luis Lizarraga at two minutes and thirty-seven seconds of the first round to win the regional, International Boxing Council (IBC) Intercontinental super featherweight title. He has also won the vacant WBO intercontinental super featherweight title during his fight with Genaro Trazancos.

On August 6, he beat former WBA Bantamweight champion Al Kotey by a ten-round unanimous decision in San Juan. On August 20, 2005, Cotto would have boxed Manuel Medina, with a world title shot at stake. But he was unable to make the fight's weight limit and the fight was cancelled.

On January 29, 2005, Cotto knocked out Armando Cordoba in the first round to win the vacant WBO NABO lightweight title.

On January 20, 2006, Cotto knocked Ubaldo Hernandez out in seven rounds at Mayfield, California. On April 8, he received his first world title try, losing a twelve-round decision to Juan Díaz as part of a Pay Per View undercard, for the WBA world Lightweight title in an exciting fight where both contestants threw nearly a hundred punches per round.

In May 2007, he and Prawat Singwangcha (30-3-1, 18 KOs) battled to a twelve-round draw in a bout for the vacant WBA lightweight title.

Cotto then proceeded to fight Canelo Álvarez at welterweight. Cotto got off to a good start and almost knocked out Alvarez, in round 2, Cotto went down after missing a hook. The referee stopped the fight in round 9 after Cotto was trapped in the corner and was taking many flush right hands by Alvarez.

On April 9, 2011, he lost a 10-round unanimous decision to former IBF Light Welterweight champion Paulie Malignaggi, managing to buckle Maligaggi a couple of times.

He was scheduled to face former two time lightweight champion José Luis Castillo on February 11, 2012, though it was cancelled due to Castillo coming in overweight. On April 21, 2012, Jose Cotto beat Eric Cruz (13-8 13 KO's) by UD over 10 rounds, knocking the overmatched opponent down twice.

== Professional boxing record (incomplete) ==
33 Wins (24 knockouts), 4 loss(s), 1 Draw, 0 No Contest
Res.	Record	Opponent	Type	Rd., Time	Date	Location	Notes
Loss	33-4-1	(United States) Manuel Pérez	SD	10	2012-07-21	(Mexico) Oasis Hotel Complex, Cancún, Quintana Roo	For NABA Lightweight title.
Win	33-3-1	(Puerto Rico) Eric Cruz	UD	10	2012-04-21	(Puerto Rico) Coliseo Roger L. Mendoza, Caguas	
Loss	32-3-1	(United States) Paulie Malignaggi	UD	10	2011-04-09	(United States) MGM Grand Garden Arena, Las Vegas	
Win	32-2-1	(Barbados) Christopher Henry	TKO	4 (10), 1:19	2010-11-05	(Puerto Rico) Coliseo Cosme Beitia Salamo, Cataño	
Loss	31-2-1	(Mexico) Canelo Álvarez	TKO	9 (10), 2:51	2010-05-01	(United States) MGM Grand Garden Arena, Las Vegas	For NABF WBA Latino Super-Light Welterweight title.
Win	31-1-1	(Colombia) Ilido Julio	TKO	6 (8)	2009-12-19	(Puerto Rico) Coliseo Roger L. Mendoza, Caguas	
Win	30-1-1	(United States) Martin Ramirez	KO	3 (8), 2:52	2009-09-26	(Puerto Rico) Coliseo Héctor Solá Bezares, Caguas	
Win	29-1-1	(The Bahamas) Anthony Woods	TKO	4 (8), 2:24	2009-08-29	(Puerto Rico) Coliseo Ruben Viera, Las Piedras	
Draw	28-1-1	(Thailand) Prawet Singwancha	MD	12	2007-05-11	(Puerto Rico) Coliseo Angel 'Cholo' Espada, Salinas	For vacant WBA World Lightweight title.
Win	28-1-0	(Colombia) Ivan Hernandez	TKO	10 (10), 1:57	2006-08-04	(Puerto Rico) Coliseo Pedrín Zorrilla, Hato Rey	
Loss	27-1-0	(United States) Juan Díaz	UD	12	2006-04-08	(United States) Thomas & Mack Center, Las Vegas	For WBA World Lightweight title.
Win	26-0-0	(Mexico) Ubaldo Hernandez	KO	7 (10), 2:59	2006-01-20	(United States) Activity Center, Maywood, California	
Win	25-0-0	(Mexico) Genaro Trazancos	TKO	7 (12), 1:00	2005-03-04	(Puerto Rico) Coliseo Pedrín Zorrilla, Hato Rey	Won vacant WBO Inter-Continental Super Featherweight title.
Win	24-0-0	(Panama) Armando Cordoba	KO	1 (12), 1:27	2005-01-29	(Puerto Rico) Coliseo Rubén Rodríguez, Hato Rey	Won vacant WBO NABO Lightweight title.
Win	23-0-0	(Ghana) Alfred Kotey	UD	10	2004-08-06	(Puerto Rico) Coliseo Pedrín Zorrilla, Hato Rey	
Win	22-0-0	(Mexico) Luis Alfonso Lizarraga	KO	1 (11), 2:27	2004-05-14	(United States) Dodge Theater, Phoenix, Arizona	Won IBC Intercontinental Lightweight title.

== See also ==
- Boxing at the 1995 Pan American Games
- Boxing at the 1996 Summer Olympics
- List of Puerto Ricans

Awards and achievements
Preceded by Fernando Velardez	WBC Youth World Super Bantamweight Champion; August 20, 2000 – September 23, 2000; Vacated	Vacant Title next held by Fernando Velardez
Vacant Title last held by Lemuel Nelson	IBC Intercontinental Super Featherweight Champion; April 14, 2004 – 2005; Vacated	Succeeded by Incumbent
Vacant Title last held by Ebo Elder	WBO NABO Lightweight Champion; January 29, 2005 – July 22, 2005; Vacated	Succeeded by Rolando Reyes
Vacant Title last held by Janos Nagy	WBO Intercontinental Super Featherweight Champion; March 4, 2005 – December 2, 2005; Vacated	Succeeded by Julio Pablo Chacon
