= Luis Ernesto José =

Dominican Republic boxer (born 1975)

Personal information
- Born: October 11, 1975 (age 50)
Medal record
Men's Boxing
Representing the Dominican Republic
Pan American Games
| Bronze medal – third place | 1995 Mar del Plata | Featherweight |

Luis Ernesto José (born October 11, 1975, in La Romana, Dominican Republic) is a lightweight boxer from the Dominican Republic, who won a bronze medal at the 1995 Pan American Games in Mar del Plata, Argentina. He made his professional debut on May 14, 2000.
