= Peru at the Pan American Games =

- IOC code: PER
- NOC: Peruvian Olympic Committee
- Website: www.coperu.org
- Medals Ranked 15th: Gold 29 Silver 46 Bronze 105 Total 180

Pan American Games appearances (overview)
- 1951; 1955; 1959; 1963; 1967; 1971; 1975; 1979; 1983; 1987; 1991; 1995; 1999; 2003; 2007; 2011; 2015; 2019; 2023

Peru at the Pan American Games. The Peruvians had participated in all editions of the games, except in 1955 in Mexico City. They have won a total of 19 gold medals, 40 silver and 90 bronze and 149 overall counting the 2019 Panamerican Games in Lima.

Lima was elected to stage the Games in 2013. It is the seventh city in South America to receive the games.

The Peruvian capital, Lima, was the venue for the games in 2019. The inauguration of the event was on July 26 at the National Stadium of Lima, with more than 50,000 people present. The event was preceded by the President of Peru, Martin Vizcarra.

As host of Pan American Games in Lima, Peru made sporting history by winning 11 gold medals, surpassing the 3 at Toronto in 2015 and the 2 won in Buenos Aires in 1951. Prior to these Games Peru had won 8 gold medals all told; in Lima alone Peru won 11 gold medals in one edition. This is by far the best performance of any Peruvian sporting delegation to date.

== Pan American Games ==
=== Medals by games ===
Year	Host city	Gold	Silver	Bronze	Total
1951	Buenos Aires	2	5	7	14
1955	Mexico City	0	0	0	0
1959	Chicago	0	2	5	7
1963	São Paulo	0	1	1	2
1967	Winnipeg	0	2	1	3
1971	Cali	0	1	4	5
1975	Mexico City	1	1	0	2
1979	San Juan	0	1	2	3
1983	Caracas	1	1	4	6
1987	Indianapolis	0	4	2	6
1991	Havana	0	0	3	3
1995	Mar del Plata	0	3	4	7
1999	Winnipeg	0	2	6	8
2003	Santo Domingo	1	1	8	10
2007	Rio de Janeiro	0	4	8	12
2011	Guadalajara	0	2	5	7
2015	Toronto	3	3	6	12
2019	Lima	11	7	23	41
2023	Santiago	10	6	16	32
2027	Lima	Future event			
Total		29	46	105	180

=== Medalists ===
(This section will be changing until we investigate all data)

Gold medal

1951 Buenos Aires - Edwin Vásquez Cam (Shooting)

1951 Buenos Aires - Julia Sánchez (Athletics - 100 m)

1975 Mexico - Edith Noeding (Running - 100 m vallas)

1983 Caracas - Carlos Hora (Shooting)

2003 Santo Domingo - Alexis Carvajal (Karate)

2015 Toronto - Francisco Boza (Shooting)

2015 Toronto - Natalia Cuglievan (Water skiing tricks)

2015 Toronto - Alexandra Grande (Karate)

2019 Lima - Gladys Tejeda (Athletics - Women Marathon)

2019 Lima - Christian Pacheco (Athletics - Men Marathon)

2019 Lima - Diego Elías (Squash)

2019 Lima - Natalia Cuglievan (Water skiing tricks)

2019 Lima - Piccolo Clemente (Men Surf Longboard)

2019 Lima - Lucca Mesinas (Men Surf Open)

2019 Lima - Daniella Rosas (Women Surf Open)

2019 Lima - John Trebejo, Oliver Del Castillo y Carlos Lam (Men Karate Kata)

2019 Lima - Claudia Suárez (Ball game Basque Paleta fronton)

2019 Lima - Kevin Martínez (Ball game Basque Paleta fronton)

2019 Lima - Alexandra Grande (Karate)

Silver medal

(winners under research)

1951 Buenos Aires - Gerardo Salazar (Decathlon), Javier Piqueras Sánchez Concha (Pole vault Men) 2007 Rio de Janeiro - Alexander Zimmermann (Sailing Men's Sunfish Class), Peter Lopez (Taekwondo Men's 68 kg), Miñán Mogollón (Weightlifting Men's 62 kg), Sixto Barrera (Wrestling Men's Greco-Roman 74 kg) 2011 Guadalajara - Lizbeth Diez-Canseco (Taekwondo Women's 49 kg) Alexandra Grande (Karate Women's 61 kg) 2019 Lima - Gabriela García León (Athleticism Women March), Alonso Wong (Judo), Tamil Martino (Surf SUP Men), María Fernanda Reyes (Longboard Women), Vania Torres (Surf SUP Women), Hugo Del Castillo (Taekwondo Poomsae Individual Men), Marcela Castillo (Taekwondo Poomsae Individual Women).

Bronze medal

(winners under research)

2011 Guadalajara - Claudia Rivero (Badminton Women's singles), Claudia Rivero with Rodrigo Pacheco (Badminton Mixed doubles), Gladys Tejeda (Athletics Women's Marathon), Inés Melchor (Athletics Women's 5,000 metres), Juan Postigos (Judo Men's 60 kg) 2015 Toronto - Alexandra Vindrola (Karate), Thalia Mallqui, Yanet Sovero (Wrestling Freestyle women), Mario Molina (Wrestling Greco-Roman) 2019 Lima - Mario Bazan (Athleticism 3000m Obstáculos Men), Leodan Pezo Saboya (Box 60kg-Light Men) José Maria Lucar (Box 91kg-Crucero Men), Mariano Wong (Karate Individual Kata Men), Team Peru (Karate Kata Women), Isabel Aco (Karate +68kg), Ingrid Aranda (Karate Individual Kata Women), Luis Bardalez, (Weightlifting 67 kg Men), Thalia Mallqui (Wrestling Free 50 Women), Team Peru (BQP Frontenis Women Double), Team Peru (Squash Men Double), Itzel Delgado (Surf SUP Race men), Team Peru (Taekwondo Poomsae Pair Mixed), Team Peru Tenis Galdos y Varillas (Tenis Double Men), Team Peru Iamachkine y Galdos (Tenis Double Mixed), Marko Carrillo (Shooting 25m Pistol Tiro Rapido Men), Nicolas Pacheco, (Shooting Skeet Men), Renzo Sanguineti (Sailing Open Boat), Maria Bazo (Sailing Tabla a Vela Women) Yuta Galarreta (Judo 90kg Hombres) Yuliana Bolívar (Judo +78kg Mujeres).

== Junior Pan American Games ==
=== Medals by games ===
Games	Gold	Silver	Bronze	Total	Rank
(Colombia) 2021 Cali-Valle	6	15	14	35	12th
(Paraguay) 2025 Asunción	Future event				
Total	6	15	14	35	12th
