= John Nolasco =

Dominican Republic boxer (born 1975)

Personal information
- Born: August 15, 1975 (age 50)
Medal record
Men's Boxing
Representing the Dominican Republic
Pan American Games
Bronze medal – third place	1995 Mar del Plata	Bantamweight
Central American and Caribbean Games
Bronze medal – third place	1993 Ponce	Flyweight

John ("Johnny") Nolasco Hughes (born August 15, 1975 in La Romana, Dominican Republic) is a featherweight boxer from the Dominican Republic, who won the bronze medal at the 1995 Pan American Games in Mar del Plata, Argentina. A year later he represented his native country at the 1996 Summer Olympics. Nolasco made his professional debut on March 17, 1999.
