= Walter Crucce =

Argentine boxer

Personal information
- Full name: Walter Javier Crucce
- Nickname: El Pibe de Oro
- Nationality: Argentina
- Born: September 5, 1974 (age 51) Las Flores, Buenos Aires
- Height: 1.65 m (5 ft 5 in)

Sport
- Sport: Boxing
- Weight class: Light Welterweight
Medal record
Pan American Games
Gold medal – first place	1995 Mar del Plata	Light-Welterweight

Walter Crucce (born September 5, 1974) is a retired male boxer from Argentina, who won the gold medal in the men's light-welterweight (– 63.5 kg) category at the 1995 Pan American Games in Mar del Plata, Argentina. In the final he defeated Puerto Rico's Luis Deines Pérez. Crucce made his professional debut on 1995-07-08 defeating Sandro Ramon Sosa on knock-out. For the press and much of the general public, Crucce was considered in the 90's as the future of Argentine boxing. It was a great puncher and in his first 22 fights, ten were won in the first round. Over time his career was devaluing by weight problems. His last fight was on 2012/08/28, when he retired in the 6th round against Brazilian boxer Junior Jackson, for the WBO Latino title in the light heavyweight category.

== Professional boxing record ==
50 Wins (37 knockouts), 13 Loss
Res.	Record	Opponent	Type	Rd., Time	Date	Location	Notes
Loss	50-13	(Australia) Junior Talipeau	UD	12 (12)	2013-08-30	Homebush, New South Wales, Australia	
Loss	50-12	(Brazil) Jackson Junior	RTD	6 (12)	2012-08-28	Ginasio Baby Barione, Sao Paulo, Sao Paulo, Brazil	For vacant WBO Latino light heavyweight title
Win	50-11	(Argentina) Bernardino Gonzalez	UD	6 (6)	2012-02-11	Club River Plate, Azul, Buenos Aires, Argentina	
Win	49-11	(Argentina) Claudio Omar Parra	KO	1 (8)	2011-10-21	Club River Plate, Azul, Buenos Aires, Argentina	
Win	48-11	(Argentina) Alejandro Gabriel Boatto	KO	4 (6)	2011-05-07	Club Sociedad Sportiva, Gualeguay, Entre Rios, Argentina	
Loss	47-11	(Brazil) Marcus Vinicius de Oliveira	UD	12 (12)	2011-02-26	Ginasio Mane Garrincha, Sao Paulo, Sao Paulo, Brazil	For WBO Latino light heavyweight title
Win	47-10	(Argentina) Gustavo Daniel Boggio	UD	4 (4)	2010-10-09	Polideportivo San Pedro, San Martin, Mendoza, Argentina	
Win	46-10	(Argentina) Mario Javier Moreno	KO	2 (10)	2005-12-03	Club Cervantes, Cervantes, Rio Negro, Argentina	
Loss	45-10	(Argentina) Javier Alberto Mamani	UD	10 (10)	2005-03-05	Gimnasio Municipal Nº 1, San Carlos de Bariloche, Rio Negro, Argentina	
Loss	45-9	(Argentina) Miguel Angel Arroyo	TD	8 (10)	2005-01-21	Ex Salta Club, Salta, Salta, Argentina	
Loss	45-8	(Australia) Shannan Taylor	UD	12 (12)	2004-06-25	Royal Pines Resort, Ashmore, Gold Coast, Queensland, Australia	
Loss	45-7	(Argentina) Javier Alberto Mamani	SD	10 (10)	2004-04-17	Estadio F.A.B., Buenos Aires, Distrito Federal, Argentina	
