= Thompson García =

Ecuadorian boxer

Personal information
- Born: December 16, 1970 (age 55)
Medal record
Men's Boxing
Representing Ecuador
Pan American Games
Silver medal – second place	1995 Mar del Plata	Light Heavyweight

Thompson García (born December 16, 1970) is a former boxer from Ecuador, competing in the heavyweight (> 91 kg) division. He was born in Esmeraldas.

== Amateur ==
Garcia won the Light heavyweight silver medal at the 1995 Pan American Games, where he lost the final to Antonio Tarver of the United States.

He represented his native country at heavyweight at the 1996 Summer Olympics in Atlanta, Georgia, where he lost to Georgi Kandelaki.

== Pro ==
He turned pro in 1999 at Cruiser but lost his first fight and retired the next year with a 3-2 record.
