= Kurt Sinette =

Trinidad and Tobago boxer (born 1974)

Personal information
- Full name: Kurt Sinette
- Nationality: Trinidad and Tobago
- Born: May 9, 1974 (age 52)
- Height: 1.85 m (6 ft 1 in)
- Weight: 71 kg (157 lb)

Sport
- Sport: Boxing
- Weight class: Light Middleweight
Medal record
Pan American Games
Bronze medal – third place	1995 Mar del Plata	Light Middleweight
Central American and Caribbean Games
Bronze medal – third place	1998 Maracaibo	Light Middleweight

Kurt Sinette (born May 9, 1974) is a retired male boxer from Trinidad and Tobago, who won the bronze medal in the men's light middleweight (– 71 kg) category at the 1995 Pan American Games in Mar del Plata. He also came in 17th in the 1996 Summer Olympics in Atlanta.
