= Allen Hudson =

American legislator and constable

Allen Hudson was a constable and state legislator in South Carolina. He served in the South Carolina House of Representatives from 1874 to 1876 representing Lancaster County. He was African-American.

== See also ==
- African American officeholders from the end of the Civil War until before 1900
