= Pete Spanakos =

American boxer (born 1938)

Personal information
- Born: July 26, 1938 (age 88)
- Height: 161 cm (5 ft 3 in)
- Weight: 54 kg (119 lb)

Sport
- Sport: Boxing
- Club: Red Hook NYC Parks Depart, Wisconsin Badgers, College of Idaho
- Coached by: Johnny Reed
Medal record
Representing the United States
Pan American Games
Bronze medal – third place	1959 Chicago	-54 kg
1960 Bantamweight Golden Gloves Champion

Petros M. Spanakos (born July 26, 1938) is a retired American bantamweight boxer who won a bronze medal at the 1959 Pan American Games. His twin brother Nick is also a retired competitive boxer.

Spanakos twins were born into a Greek immigrant family, descendants of the Ancient Lacedaemonian (Spartans), parents Michael and Stella Spanakos who left Mani province at sixteen in 1912 and six years old in 1908, respectively. They had five older brothers and attended the College of Idaho. Pete graduated from Brooklyn Law School and worked most of his career as a counselor for the New York City Board of Education. In 1966 he married a Greek woman named Stratoniki.

- 1952-1956 Attended Fort Hamilton High School and was elected senior class president. 1959 Inducted into the Fort Hamilton High School Athletic Hall of Fame.
- 1955 112 lbs Petros Spanakos 16 years old won the novice New York City Golden Gloves' championship at flyweight vs. Victor Bonner. Becoming the first twin(s) to enter and or win the New York City Golden Gloves.
- 1956 118 lbs February 20, he won the New York Daily News Golden Gloves' open championship at bantam weight vs. Frank Figueroa by default.
- 1956 118 lbs March 7 he won the New York Golden Gloves Tournament of Champions at bantamweight vs. Joe Stewart and did not represent New York at the Intercity Golden Gloves Tournament that year.
- Originally receiving a boxing scholarship with the Wisconsin Badgers but later was a standout boxer for the College of Idaho from 1957-1960.
- A three-time competitor at the U.S. Olympic Trials (1956, 1960, 1964).
- 1959 54 kg/118 lbs Pan-American Trials winner.
- 1959 54 kg/118 lbs Spanakos earned a bronze medal at the 1959 Pan-American Games.
- 1960 118 lbs attending the College of Idaho, with his twin brother boxer Nick Spanakos both fighting out of Hollywood, California, Petros Spanakos won the Chicago Golden Gloves Tournament of Champions at bantamweight over Darrell Shavanaux.
- 1960 118 lbs representing Chicago won the Intercity Golden Gloves' championship vs. Mike Loucas at bantamweight.
- Won the 1960 118 lbs National Golden Gloves championship.
- 1961 Entered New York Law School later in 1965 graduated from Brooklyn Law School with a Juris Doctor.
- 1961 118 lbs New York Daily News Golden Gloves' semi-finals. Lost to either Joe Cortez, Boys Club of NY or Angelo Soto, Salem Crescent AC
- 1964 126 lbs New York Daily News Golden Gloves' won the open championship vs. Angelo Alvarez at featherweight. With this win becoming the first to win championships in three weight classes.
- It has been said that Pete Spanakos and Harry Smith are the only fighters to win both the Chicago and New York Golden Gloves Tournaments of Champions.
- 1964 126 lbs silver medal United States National Championships - Las Vegas - April 8–10, 1964
- 1989 Inducted into the AHEPA Athletic hall of fame.
- 2001 Inducted into the College of Idaho Athletic Hall of Fame.
- Ranked 9 along with twin brother Nikos in Ringside Book’s Amateur Rankings.
- 2014 Inducted into the New York Daily News Golden Gloves Hall of Fame.
- He and his twin brother Nick Spanakos were dubbed the Greek Twins, by some in the press.
- The Spanakos brothers are originally from the Red Hook section of Brooklyn, NY.

All accomplished while attending High School, College and Law School.
