= Ecuador at the Pan American Games =

- IOC code: ECU
- NOC: Comité Olímpico Ecuatoriano
- Website: www.coe.org.ec
- Medals Ranked 12th: Gold 45 Silver 49 Bronze 94 Total 188

Pan American Games appearances (overview)
- 1951; 1955; 1959; 1963; 1967; 1971; 1975; 1979; 1983; 1987; 1991; 1995; 1999; 2003; 2007; 2011; 2015; 2019; 2023

Ecuador at the Pan American Games.

== Pan American Games ==
=== Medals by games ===
Year	Host city	Gold	Silver	Bronze	Total
1951	Buenos Aires	1	0	1	2
1955	Mexico City	0	0	0	0
1959	Chicago	0	1	0	1
1963	São Paulo	0	0	0	0
1967	Winnipeg	0	1	2	3
1971	Cali	1	0	2	3
1975	Mexico City	1	1	1	3
1979	San Juan	0	0	2	2
1983	Caracas	1	0	0	1
1987	Indianapolis	0	1	5	6
1991	Havana	0	1	1	2
1995	Mar del Plata	1	1	3	5
1999	Winnipeg	1	2	5	8
2003	Santo Domingo	3	1	5	9
2007	Rio de Janeiro	5	4	10	19
2011	Guadalajara	7	8	9	24
2015	Toronto	7	9	16	32
2019	Lima	10	7	15	32
2023	Santiago	7	12	17	36
Total		45	49	94	188

== Junior Pan American Games ==
=== Medals by games ===
Games	Gold	Silver	Bronze	Total	Gold medals	Total medals
(Colombia) 2021 Cali-Valle	15	14	24	53	7th	8th
(Paraguay) 2025 Asunción	Future event					
Total	15	14	24	53	7th	8th
