= Luis Deines Pérez =

Puerto Rican boxer (born 1973)

Luis Angel Pérez Deines
Personal information
- Full name: Luis Angel Pérez Deines
- Nationality: Puerto Rico
- Born: March 29, 1973 (age 53)
- Height: 1.72 m (5 ft 7 1/2 in)
- Weight: 64 kg (141 lb)

Sport
- Sport: Boxing
- Weight class: Light Welterweight
Medal record
Pan American Games
Silver medal – second place	1995 Mar del Plata	Light-Welterweight

Luis Deines Pérez (born March 29, 1973) is a retired male boxer from Puerto Rico, who won the silver medal in the men's light-welterweight (– 63.5 kg) category at the 1995 Pan American Games in Mar del Plata. In the final he was defeated by Argentina's Walter Crucce. Pérez represented his native country at the 1996 Summer Olympics in Atlanta, Georgia, falling in the first round to Poland's Jacek Bielski.
