= Vince Shomo =

American boxer (1940–2020)

Vincent O'Neal Shomo better known as Vince Shomo or Vincent Shomo (born in New York, NY on 30 July 1940 - June 9, 2020) was a 5-foot-7-inch (170 cm) American amateur light welterweight boxer and champion.

Shomo won four Daily News Golden Gloves titles in five years between 1956 and 1960. In 1956 he won the sub-novice championship at 126 pounds and three times in the 135-pound open titles in 1957, 1958 and 1960. by taking part in a number of championship tournaments run by the National Amateur Boxing Welterweight Association also known as United States Amateur Championships.

In 1959, Shomo came first in the lightweight category for the Pan-American Games that were organized in Chicago between 27 August and 7 September 1959. In the quarter-finals of the Pan-American Games, he defeated the representative of Brazil Jorge Sacomãna. In the semi-final duel, Shomo faced Mexico's representative Humberto Dip, with whom he won by technical knockout in the first round. In the final he faced the Argentine Luis Aranda, defeating him by a technical knockout in the first round.

He continued boxing until 1968 with the period 1960 to 1968 as a professional boxer. Later on in the 1980s, he returned as a boxing official. He was inducted to the Daily News Golden Gloves Hall of Fame. Retired, he lived in Stroudsburg, Pennsylvania, USA.

== See also ==
- List of United States national amateur boxing light welterweight champions
