= Gabriel Hernández (boxer) =

Dominican Republic boxer (1973–2001)

Personal information
- Full name: Gabriel Hernández
- Nickname: tito
- Nationality: Dominican
- Born: July 13, 1973 La Romana
- Died: June 25, 2001 (aged 27) Yonkers, New York
- Height: 1.96 m (6 ft 5 in)
- Weight: 81 kg (179 lb)

Sport
- Sport: Boxing
- Weight class: Light Heavyweight
Medal record
Men's Boxing
Representing the Dominican Republic
Pan American Games
Bronze medal – third place	1995 Mar del Plata	Light Heavyweight

Gabriel Hernández Romero (July 13, 1973 – June 25, 2001) was a male boxer from the Dominican Republic, who competed for his native country at the 1996 Summer Olympics in Atlanta, Georgia. There he was stopped in the first round of the men's light heavyweight division by South Africa's Sybrand Botes (11–16).

A bronze medal winner at the 1995 Pan American Games Hernández made his professional debut on November 15, 1996, defeating Shawn Cornell by knock-out in the first round.

Hernández died at the age of 27. The cause of death was suicide.
