= Dominican Republic at the Pan American Games =

- IOC code: DOM
- NOC: Comité Olímpico Dominicano
- Website: www.colimdo.org
- Medals Ranked 10th: Gold 48 Silver 82 Bronze 150 Total 280

Pan American Games appearances (overview)
- 1951; 1955; 1959; 1963; 1967; 1971; 1975; 1979; 1983; 1987; 1991; 1995; 1999; 2003; 2007; 2011; 2015; 2019; 2023

The Dominican Republic at the Pan American Games.

== Pan American Games ==
=== Medals by games ===
Year	Host city	Gold	Silver	Bronze	Total
1951	Buenos Aires	0	0	0	0
1955	Mexico City	1	0	0	1
1959	Chicago	0	0	0	0
1963	São Paulo	0	0	0	0
1967	Winnipeg	0	0	0	0
1971	Cali	0	0	0	0
1975	Mexico City	0	1	7	8
1979	San Juan	0	5	10	15
1983	Caracas	0	7	12	19
1987	Indianapolis	0	3	9	12
1991	Havana	0	5	4	9
1995	Mar del Plata	1	1	5	7
1999	Winnipeg	1	3	6	10
2003	Santo Domingo	10	12	19	41
2007	Rio de Janeiro	6	6	17	29
2011	Guadalajara	7	9	17	33
2015	Toronto	3	11	10	24
2019	Lima	11	12	17	40
2023	Santiago	8	7	17	32
Total		48	82	150	280

== Junior Pan American Games ==
=== Medals by games ===
Games	Gold	Silver	Bronze	Total	Rank
(Colombia) 2021 Cali-Valle	5	8	10	23	13th
(Paraguay) 2025 Asunción	Future event				
Total	5	8	10	23	13th
