= List of FIBA Intercontinental Cup finals =

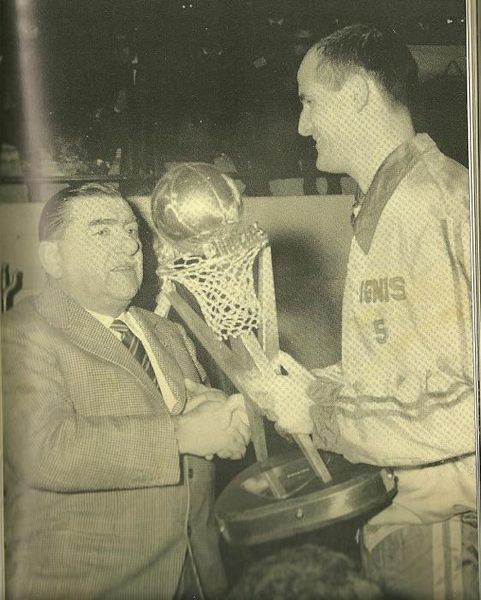
Giovanni Gavagnin of Varese accepting the first official Intercontinental Cup trophy in 1966

The FIBA Intercontinental Cup (formerly the FIBA Club World Cup) is an international basketball competition that is organised by FIBA, the sport's global governing body. Currently, NBA G League United and five teams qualify for each season, the winners of the Basketball Africa League (BAL), Basketball Champions League (BCL), Basketball Champions League Americas (BCLA), Basketball Champions League Asia (BCL Asia) and the National Basketball League (NBL).

From to 1970 to 1980, there were no finals played as the league champions were decided through a league format, in which all teams played each other once and were ranked based on wins. The Intercontinental Cup was not organised between 1998 and 1995, and 1997 and 2012 as well.

Real Madrid holds the record for most championships, with five, with two of them coming after a direct confrontation in a final. Spain has been the most successful country with nine titles distributed among clubs from the country. Teams representing Europe have been most successful, winning 33 titles in total.

== List of finals ==
Season	Champions		Score	Runners-up		Final venue	Host nation	Attendance	Ref(s)
Season	Country	Club	Score	Club	Country	Final venue	Host nation	Attendance	Ref(s)
1965 (Note: The 1965 FIBA Intercontinental Cup Test Tournament was a test tournament and is not recognised as an official edition of the competition.)	Brazil	Corinthians	118–109	Real Madrid	Spain	Ginásio do Ibirapuera, São Paulo	Brazil	10,000	
1966	Italy	Varese	66–59	Corinthians	Brazil	Raimundo Saporta Pavilion, Madrid	Spain	5,000	
1967	United States	Akron Goodyear Wingfoots	78–72	Varese	Italy	Palazzetto dello Sport, Rome	Italy	15,000	
1968	United States	Akron Goodyear Wingfoots	105–73	Real Madrid	Spain	Spectrum, Philadelphia	United States	17,000	
1969	United States	Akron Goodyear Wingfoots	84–71	Spartak Brno	Czechoslovakia	Macon Coliseum, Georgia	United States	2,000	
1970–1980	No finals played as the Intercontinental Cup used a league format								
1981	Spain	Real Madrid	109–83	Sírio	Brazil	Ginásio do Ibirapuera, São Paulo	Brazil	16,000	
1985	Spain	Barcelona	93–89	Monte Líbano	Brazil	Palau Blaugrana, Barcelona	Spain	5,000	
1986	Soviet Union	Žalgiris	84–78	Ferro Carril Oeste	Argentina	Estadio Obras Sanitarias, Buenos Aires	Argentina	5,930	
1987	Italy	Olimpia Milano	100–84	FC Barcelona	Spain	Palatrussardi, Milan	Italy	7,000	
1988–1995	Not held								
1996	Greece	Panathinaikos	83–89	Olimpia	Argentina	Estadio Cubierto Newell's Old Boys, Rosario	Argentina	7,000	
1996	Greece	Panathinaikos	83–78	Olimpia	Argentina	Olympic Indoor Hall, Athens	Greece	20,000	
1996	Greece	Panathinaikos	101–76	Olimpia	Argentina	Olympic Indoor Hall, Athens	Greece	20,000	
1997–2012	Not held								
2013	Greece	Olympiacos	81–70	Pinheiros	Brazil	Ginásio José Corrêa, São Paulo	Brazil	4,500	
2013	Greece	Olympiacos	86–69	Pinheiros	Brazil	Ginásio José Corrêa, São Paulo	Brazil	3,000	
2014	Brazil	Flamengo	69–66	Maccabi Tel Aviv	Israel	HBSC Arena, Rio de Janeiro	Brazil	7,000	
2014	Brazil	Flamengo	90–77	Maccabi Tel Aviv	Israel	HBSC Arena, Rio de Janeiro	Brazil	14,500	
2015	Spain	Real Madrid	90–91	Bauru	Brazil	Ginásio do Ibirapuera, São Paulo	Brazil	5,500	
2015	Spain	Real Madrid	91–79	Bauru	Brazil	Ginásio do Ibirapuera, São Paulo	Brazil	8,000	
2016	Venezuela	Guaros de Lara	74–69	Skyliners Frankfurt	Germany	Fraport Arena, Frankfurt	Germany	5,002	
2017	Spain	Canarias	76–71	Guaros de Lara	Venezuela	Santiago Martín, La Laguna	Spain	5,100	
2019	Greece	AEK	86–70	Flamengo	Brazil	Carioca Arena 1, Rio de Janeiro	Brazil	6,000	
2020	Spain	Canarias	80–72	Virtus Bologna	Italy	Santiago Martín, La Laguna (2)	Spain	3,000	
2021	Spain	San Pablo Burgos	82–73	Quimsa	Argentina	Estadio Obras Sanitarias, Buenos Aires (2)	Argentina	0 (Note: The 2021 Intercontinental Cup was played behind closed doors due to restrictions related to the COVID-19 pandemic.)	
2022	Brazil	Flamengo	75–62	San Pablo Burgos	Spain	Hassan Moustafa Sports Hall, Cairo	Egypt	2,000	
2023 (I)	Spain	Canarias	89–68	São Paulo	Brazil	Santiago Martín, La Laguna (3)	Spain	4,887	
2023 (II)	Brazil	Franca	70–69	Baskets Bonn	Germany	Singapore Indoor Stadium, Singapore	Singapore	8,000	
2024	Spain	Unicaja	75–60	NBA G League United	United States	Singapore Indoor Stadium, Singapore (2)	Singapore	8,205	
2025	Spain	Unicaja	71–61	NBA G League United	United States	Singapore Indoor Stadium, Singapore (3)	Singapore	6,217	

== Results ==
=== Performance by head coach ===
Lolo Sainz holds the record for most Intercontinental Cup titles won by a head coach, with four titles won with Real Madrid. He is followed by Hank Vaughn, who managed the Akron Goodyear Wingfoots during their three consecutive championships from 1967 to 1969.

Performance by head coach
Head coach	Winner	Runner-up	Years won	Years runner-up
(Spain) Lolo Sainz	4	1	1976, 1977, 1978, 1981	1975
(United States) Hank Vaughn	3	—	1967, 1968, 1969	—
(Spain) Ibon Navarro	2	—	2024, 2025	—
(Serbia) Aleksandar Nikolić	2	—	1970, 1973	—
(Brazil) Cláudio Mortari	1	2	1979	1981, 2013
(Brazil) Gustavo de Conti	1	1	2022	2019
(Spain) Iván Déniz	1	1	2016	2017
(Brazil) Helinho	1	—	2023 (II)	—
(Spain) Txus Vidorreta	1	—	2023 (I)	—
(Spain) Joan Peñarroya	1	—	2021	—
(Italy) Luca Banchi	1	–	2019	—
(Bosnia and Herzegovina) Nenad Marković	1	—	2017	—
(Spain) Pablo Laso	1	—	2015	—
(Brazil) José Neto	1	—	2014	—
(Greece) Georgios Bartzokas	1	—	2013	—
(Serbia) Božidar Maljković	1	—	1996	—
(Italy) Franco Casalini	1	—	1987	—
(Soviet Union) Vladas Garastas	1	—	1986	—
(Spain) Manuel Flores	1	—	1985	—
(Italy) Valerio Bianchini	1	—	1984	—
(Puerto Rico) Flor Meléndez	1	—	1983	—
(Italy) Giancarlo Primo	1	—	1982	—
(United States) Rudy D'Amico	1	—	1980	—
(Italy) Arnaldo Taurisano	1	—	1975	—
(United States) Lefty Driesell	1	—	1974	—
(Italy) Nico Messina	—	2	—	1976, 1977
(Brazil) Pedroca	—	2	—	1973, 1980
(United States) Joseph Blair	—	1	—	2025
(United States) Paul Hewitt	—	1	—	2024
(Belgium) Roel Moors	—	1	—	2023 (II)
(Brazil) Bruno Mortari	—	1	—	2023 (I)
(Spain) Paco Olmos	—	1	—	2022
(Argentina) Jorge Sebastián González	—	1	—	2021
(Canada) Gordie Herbert	—	1	—	2016
(Brazil) Guerrinha	—	1	—	2015
(Israel) Guy Goodes	—	1	—	2014
(Argentina) Horacio Segul	—	1	—	1996
(Spain) Aíto García Reneses	—	1	—	1987
(Argentina) Luis Martínez	—	1	—	1986
(Brazil) Edvar Simões	—	1	—	1985
(Spain) Antoni Serra	—	1	—	1984
(Italy) Gianni Asti	—	1	—	1983
(Netherlands) Ton Boot	—	1	—	1982
(Montenegro) Bogdan Tanjević	—	1	—	1979
(Italy) Sandro Gamba	—	1	—	1974
(Czech Republic) Jaroslav Šíp	—	1	—	1970
(Czech Republic) Ivan Mrázek	—	1	—	1969
(Spain) Pedro Ferrándiz	—	1	—	1968
