= List of FIBA Intercontinental Cup participants =

The FIBA Intercontinental Cup is an international basketball competition organised by FIBA, the sport's global governing body. The champions of the competition are considered the de jure champions of the world, as representatives from all confederation can participate in the competition.

The current competitions is played by the winners of each year's Basketball Africa League (BAL), Basketball Champions League (BCL), Basketball Champions League Americas (BCL Americas), Basketball Champions League Asia (BCL Asia), National Basketball League (NBL) and the NBA G League.

== Confederation records (2013–present) ==
Only including modern era (2013–present) participations.

In the modern era of the FIBA Intercontinental Cup, that was restored in 2013, confederations can each send one team to the tournament. The current format sees FIBA Africa, FIBA Europe, FIBA Americas and FIBA Asia sending the winners of their top-level competitions, as well as Oceania's National Basketball League (NBL) and the NBA G League, which has teams from the United States, Canada and Mexico.

=== Africa ===
Since the 2022, FIBA Africa send the champions of the Basketball Africa League (BAL) to compete. As of today, a team from the BAL has yet to win a game in the competition.

| Year | Club | Method of qualification | Performance | Ref(s) |
|---|---|---|---|---|
| 2022 | (Egypt) Zamalek (1/1) | Winners of the 2021 BAL season | Fourth place | |
| 2023 (I) | (Tunisia) US Monastir (1/1) | Winners of the 2022 BAL season | Fourth place | |
| 2023 (II) | (Egypt) Al Ahly (1/1) | Winners of the 2023 BAL season | Fourth place | |
| 2024 | (Angola) Petro de Luanda (1/1) | Winners of the 2024 BAL season | Fifth place | |
| 2025 | (Libya) Al Ahli Tripoli (1/1) | Winners of the 2025 BAL season | Third place | |
| 2026 | (Rwanda) RSSB Tigers (1/1) | Winners of the 2026 BAL season | | |

=== Americas ===
| Year | Club | Method of qualification | Performance | Ref(s) |
|---|---|---|---|---|
| 2013 | (Brazil) Pinheiros (1/1) | Winners of the 2013 FIBA Americas League | Runners-up | |
| 2014 | (Brazil) Flamengo (1/4) | Winners of the 2014 FIBA Americas League | Champions | |
| 2015 | (Brazil) Bauru (1/1) | Winners of the 2015 FIBA Americas League | Runners-up | |
| 2016 | (Venezuela) Guaros de Lara (1/2) | Winners of the 2016 FIBA Americas League | Champions | |
| 2017 | (Venezuela) Guaros de Lara (2/2) | Winners of the 2017 FIBA Americas League | Runners-up | |
| 2019 | (Brazil) Flamengo (2/4) | Hosts | Runners-up | |
| 2019 | (Argentina) San Lorenzo (1/2) | Winners of the 2018 FIBA Americas League | Third place | |
| 2020 | (Argentina) San Lorenzo (2/2) | Winners of the 2019 FIBA Americas League | Third place | |
| 2021 | (Argentina) Quimsa (1/2) | Winners of the 2019–20 BCL Americas | Runners-up | |
| 2022 | (Brazil) Flamengo (3/4) | Winners of the 2021 BCL Americas | Champions | |
| 2023 (I) | (Brazil) São Paulo (1/1) | Winners of the 2021–22 BCL Americas | Runners-up | |
| 2023 (II) | (Brazil) Sesi Franca (1/1) | Winners of the 2022–23 BCL Americas | Champions | |
| 2024 | (Argentina) Quimsa (2/2) | Winners of the 2023–24 BCL Americas | Sixth place | |
| 2025 | (Brazil) Flamengo (4/4) | Winners of the 2024–25 BCL Americas | Fourth place | |
| 2026 | (Argentina) Boca Juniors (1/1) | Winners of the 2025–26 BCL Americas | | |

=== Europe ===
In the modern era of the Intercontinental Cup, teams representing Europe have reached the final in each year.

| Year | Club | Method of qualification | Performance | Ref(s) |
|---|---|---|---|---|
| 2013 | (Greece) Olympiacos (1/1) | Winners of the 2012–13 Euroleague | Champions | |
| 2014 | (Israel) Maccabi Tel Aviv (1/1) | Winners of the 2013–14 Euroleague | Runners-up | |
| 2015 | (Spain) Real Madrid (12/12) | Winners of the 2014–15 Euroleague | Champions | |
| 2016 | (Germany) Skyliners Frankfurt (1/1) | Winners of the 2015–16 FIBA Europe Cup | Runners-up | |
| 2017 | (Spain) Canarias (1/3) | Winners of the 2016–17 Basketball Champions League | Champions | |
| 2019 | (Greece) AEK (1/1) | Winners of the 2017–18 Basketball Champions League | Champions | |
| 2020 | (Spain) Canarias (2/3) | Hosts | Champions | |
| 2020 | (Italy) Virtus Bologna (1/1) | Winners of the 2018–19 Basketball Champions League | Runners-up | |
| 2021 | (Spain) San Pablo Burgos (1/2) | Winners of the 2019–20 Basketball Champions League | Champions | |
| 2022 | (Spain) San Pablo Burgos (2/2) | Winners of the 2020–21 Basketball Champions League | Runners-up | |
| 2023 (I) | (Spain) Canarias (3/3) | Winners of the 2021–22 Basketball Champions League | Champions | |
| 2023 (II) | (Germany) Telekom Baskets Bonn (1/1) | Winners of the 2022–23 Basketball Champions League | Runners-up | |
| 2024 | (Spain) Unicaja (1/2) | Winners of the 2023–24 Basketball Champions League | Champions | |
| 2025 | (Spain) Unicaja (2/2) | Winners of the 2024–25 Basketball Champions League | Champions | |
| 2026 | (Lithuania) Rytas (1/1) | Winners of the 2025–26 Basketball Champions League | | |

=== NBA G League ===
Instead of the champions of the National Basketball Association (NBA), the champions of each year's NBA G League are participating.

| Year | Club | Method of qualification | Performance | Ref(s) |
|---|---|---|---|---|
| 2019 | (United States) Austin Spurs (1/1) | Winners of the 2018–19 NBA G League season | Fourth place | |
| 2020 | (United States) Rio Grande Valley Vipers (1/2) | Winners of the 2019–20 NBA G League season | Fourth place | |
| 2022 | (United States) Lakeland Magic (1/1) | Winners of the 2021–22 NBA G League season | Third place | |
| 2023 (I) | (United States) Rio Grande Valley Vipers (2/2) | Winners of the 2022–23 NBA G League season | Third place | |
| 2023 (II) | (United States) NBA G League Ignite (1/1) | Pre-selected by the NBA G League | Fifth place | |
| 2024 | (United States) NBA G League United (1/3) | Select team set up by the NBA G League | Runners-up | |
| 2025 | (United States) NBA G League United (2/3) | Select team set up by the NBA G League | Runners-up | |
| 2026 | (United States) NBA G League United (3/3) | Select team set up by the NBA G League | | |

=== Asia ===
| Year | Club | Method of qualification | Performance | Ref(s) |
|---|---|---|---|---|
| 2023 (II) | (China) Zhejiang Golden Bulls (1/1) | Selected by the Chinese Basketball Association (CBA) | Third place | |
| 2023 (II) | (Bahrain) Manama Club (1/1) | Winners of the 2022–23 West Asia Super League | Sixth place | |
| 2024 | (Lebanon) Al Riyadi Beirut (1/1) | Winners of the 2024 Basketball Champions League Asia | Fourth place | |
| 2025 | (Japan) Utsunomiya Brex (1/1) | Winners of the 2025 Basketball Champions League Asia | Sixth place | |
| 2026 | (China) Beijing Royal Fighters (1/1) | Hosts | | |
| 2026 | (China) Shanghai Sharks (1/1) | Winners of the 2025–26 Chinese Basketball Association season | | |

=== Oceania (NBL) ===
| Year | Club | Method of qualification | Performance | Ref(s) |
|---|---|---|---|---|
| 2024 | (Australia) Tasmania JackJumpers (1/1) | Winners of the 2023–24 NBL season | Third place | |
| 2025 | (Australia) Illawarra Hawks (1/1) | Winners of the 2024–25 NBL season | Fifth place | |

== List of participating clubs of the FIBA Intercontinental Cup ==
The following is a list of clubs that have played in or qualified for the FIBA Intercontinental Cup. Editions in bold indicate competitions won. Rows can be adjusted to national league, total number of participations by national league or club and years played.

Real Madrid have contested the Intercontinental Cup twelve times, a record. The United States hold the record for the nation with the most different teams, with 21 teams having played in the competition.

List of participant clubs
| Nation | No. | Clubs | Years |
|---|---|---|---|
| United States (21) | 3 | NBA G League United | 2024, 2025, 2026 |
| United States (21) | 3 | NCAA Division I (select team) | 1979, 1980, 1987 |
| United States (21) | 3 | Akron Goodyear Wingfoots | **1967**, **1968**, **1969** |
| United States (21) | 2 | Rio Grande Valley Vipers | 2020, 2023-I |
| United States (21) | 2 | Lexington Marathon Oilers | 1973, 1984 |
| United States (21) | 1 | NBA G League Ignite | 2023-II |
| United States (21) | 1 | Lakeland Magic | 2022 |
| United States (21) | 1 | Austin Spurs | 2019 |
| United States (21) | 1 | Continental Basketball Association (select team) | 1986 |
| United States (21) | 1 | Marquette Golden Eagles | 1985 |
| United States (21) | 1 | Oregon State Beavers | 1983 |
| United States (21) | 1 | Air Force Falcons | 1982 |
| United States (21) | 1 | Clemson Tigers | 1981 |
| United States (21) | 1 | Rhode Island Rams | 1978 |
| United States (21) | 1 | Providence Friars | 1977 |
| United States (21) | 1 | Missouri Tigers | 1976 |
| United States (21) | 1 | Penn Quakers | 1975 |
| United States (21) | 1 | Maryland Terrapins | **1974** |
| United States (21) | 1 | Columbia Sertoma | 1970 |
| United States (21) | 1 | Macon Movers | 1969 |
| United States (21) | 1 | Jamaco Saints | 1966 |
| Brazil (10) | 6 | Sírio | 1969, 1973, 1978, **1979**, 1981, 1984 |
| Brazil (10) | 6 | Franca | 1975, 1976, 1977, 1980, 1981, **2023-II** |
| Brazil (10) | 4 | Monte Líbano | 1983, 1985, 1986, 1987 |
| Brazil (10) | 4 | Corinthians | 1966, 1967, 1970, 1986 |
| Brazil (10) | 3 | Flamengo | **2014**, 2025 |
| Brazil (10) | 1 | São Paulo | 2023-I |
| Brazil (10) | 1 | Bauru | 2015 |
| Brazil (10) | 1 | Pinheiros | 2013 |
| Brazil (10) | 1 | Vila Nova | 1974 |
| Brazil (10) | 1 | Botafogo | 1968 |
| Argentina (7) | 5 | Obras Sanitarias | 1976, 1978, **1983**, 1984, 1986 |
| Argentina (7) | 4 | Ferro Carril Oeste | 1981, 1982, 1986, 1987 |
| Argentina (7) | 2 | Quimsa | 2021, 2024 |
| Argentina (7) | 1 | Boca Juniors | 2026 |
| Argentina (7) | 1 | San Lorenzo | 2020 |
| Argentina (7) | 1 | Olimpia | 1996 |
| Argentina (7) | 1 | San Andrés | 1985 |
| Spain (5) | 12 | Real Madrid | 1966, 1968, 1969, 1970, 1974, 1975, **1976**, **1977**, **1978**, 1980, **1981**, **2015** |
| Spain (5) | 3 | Canarias (Note: As Iberostar Tenerife in 2017 and 2020 and as Lenovo Tenerife in 2023) | **2017**, **2020**, **2023-I** |
| Spain (5) | 2 | San Pablo Burgos | **2021**, 2022 |
| Spain (5) | 2 | Unicaja Malaga | **2024**, **2025** |
| Spain (5) | 2 | Barcelona | **1985**, 1987 |
| Italy (5) | 10 | Varese | **1966**, 1967, **1970**, **1973**, 1974, 1975, 1976, 1977, 1978, 1979 |
| Italy (5) | 4 | Olimpia Milano | 1967, 1968, 1983, **1987** |
| Italy (5) | 3 | Cantù | **1975**, **1982**, 1983 |
| Italy (5) | 2 | Virtus Roma | **1984**, 1985 |
| Italy (5) | 1 | Virtus Bologna | 2020 |
| China (4) | 1 | Beijing Royal Fighters | 2026 |
| China (4) | 1 | Shanghai Sharks | 2026 |
| China (4) | 1 | Zhejiang Golden Bulls | 2023-II |
| China (4) | 1 | Bayi Rockets | 1981 |
| Yugoslavia (3) | 3 | Cibona | 1985, 1986, 1987 |
| Yugoslavia (3) | 2 | Bosna | 1979, 1980 |
| Yugoslavia (3) | 1 | Split (Note: As KK Jugoplastika in 1973) | 1973 |
| Australia (3) | 1 | Illawarra Hawks | 2025 |
| Australia (3) | 1 | Tasmania JackJumpers | 2024 |
| Australia (3) | 1 | St. Kilda Saints | 1981 |
| Greece (3) | 1 | AEK Athens | **2019** |
| Greece (3) | 1 | Olympiacos | **2013** |
| Greece (3) | 1 | Panathinaikos | **1996** |
| Puerto Rico (3) | 1 | Cariduros de Fajardo | 1986 |
| Puerto Rico (3) | 1 | Piratas de Quebradillas | 1979 |
| Puerto Rico (3) | 1 | Vaqueros de Bayamón | 1973 |
| Mexico (3) | 1 | Dragones de Tijuana | 1977 |
| Mexico (3) | 1 | Panteras de Aguascalientes | 1974 |
| Mexico (3) | 1 | Dorados de Chihuahua | 1974 |
| Czechia (2) | 2 | USK Praha (Note: As Slavia Praha in 1970 and 1970) | 1967, 1970 |
| Czechia (2) | 1 | Brno (Note: As Spartak Brno in 1969) | 1969 |
| Egypt (2) | 1 | Al Ahly | 2023-II |
| Egypt (2) | 1 | Zamalek | 2022 |
| Germany (2) | 1 | Telekom Baskets Bonn | 2023-II |
| Germany (2) | 1 | Skyliners Frankfurt | 2016 |
| Netherlands (2) | 1 | ZZ Leiden (Note: As Elmex Leiden in 1982) | 1982 |
| Netherlands (2) | 1 | Heroes Den Bosch (Note: As EBBC Den Bosch in 1982) | 1982 |
| Israel (1) | 5 | Maccabi Tel Aviv | 1977, **1980**, 1981, 1982, 2014 |
| Soviet Union (1) | 2 | Žalgiris | **1986**, 1987 |
| Senegal (1) | 2 | ASFA | 1976, 1981 |
| Lithuania (1) | 1 | Rytas | 2026 |
| Rwanda (1) | 1 | RSSB Tigers | 2026 |
| Japan (1) | 1 | Utsunomiya Brex | 2025 |
| Libya (1) | 1 | Al Ahli Tripoli | 2025 |
| Angola (1) | 1 | Petro de Luanda | 2024 |
| Lebanon (1) | 1 | Al Riyadi Beirut | 2024 |
| Bahrain (1) | 1 | Manama Club | 2023-II |
| Tunisia (1) | 1 | US Monastir | 2023-I |
| France (1) | 1 | Limoges | 1985 |
| Cuba (1) | 1 | Guantánamo | 1985 |
| Mozambique (1) | 1 | Maxaquene | 1985 |
| Philippines (1) | 1 | Northern Cement | 1985 |
| Uruguay (1) | 1 | Peñarol | 1983 |
| Venezuela (1) | 1 | Guaiqueríes de Margarita | 1981 |
| Central African Republic (1) | 1 | Hit Trésor | 1975 |
