= FIBA Intercontinental Cup MVP =

The FIBA Intercontinental Cup Most Valuable Player (MVP) Award is the award bestowed to the player that is deemed to be the most valuable player" of the FIBA Intercontinental Cup official world basketball club championship. The winner of the award is decided by FIBA and is given after the final of the competition, usually to a player on the winning team.

The first MVP award was given in 1977 to Walt Szczerbiak, and has been given to eleven other players since. No individual player has won the award more than once.

== Award winners ==
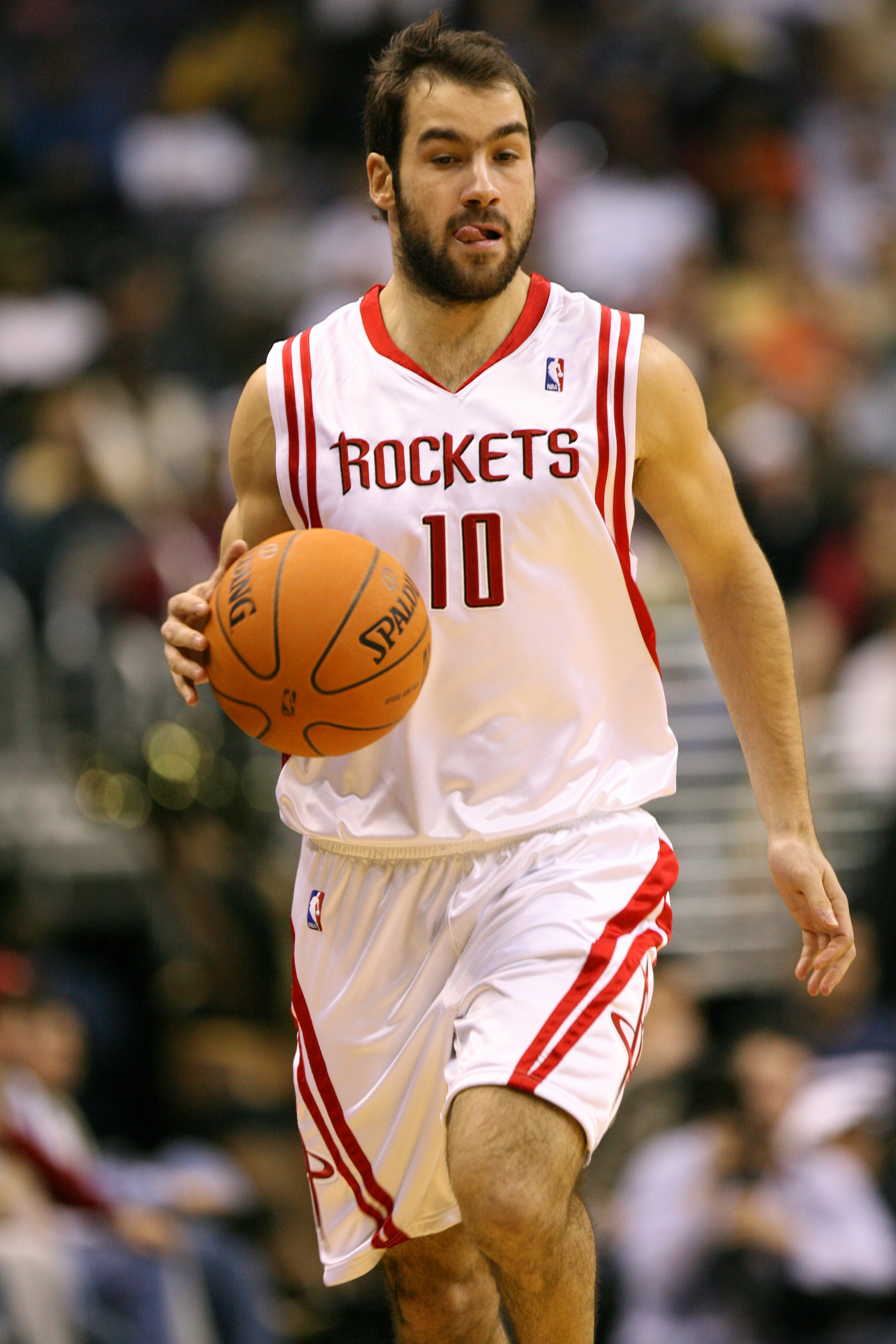
Vassilis Spanoulis was the FIBA Intercontinental Cup's MVP in 2013.

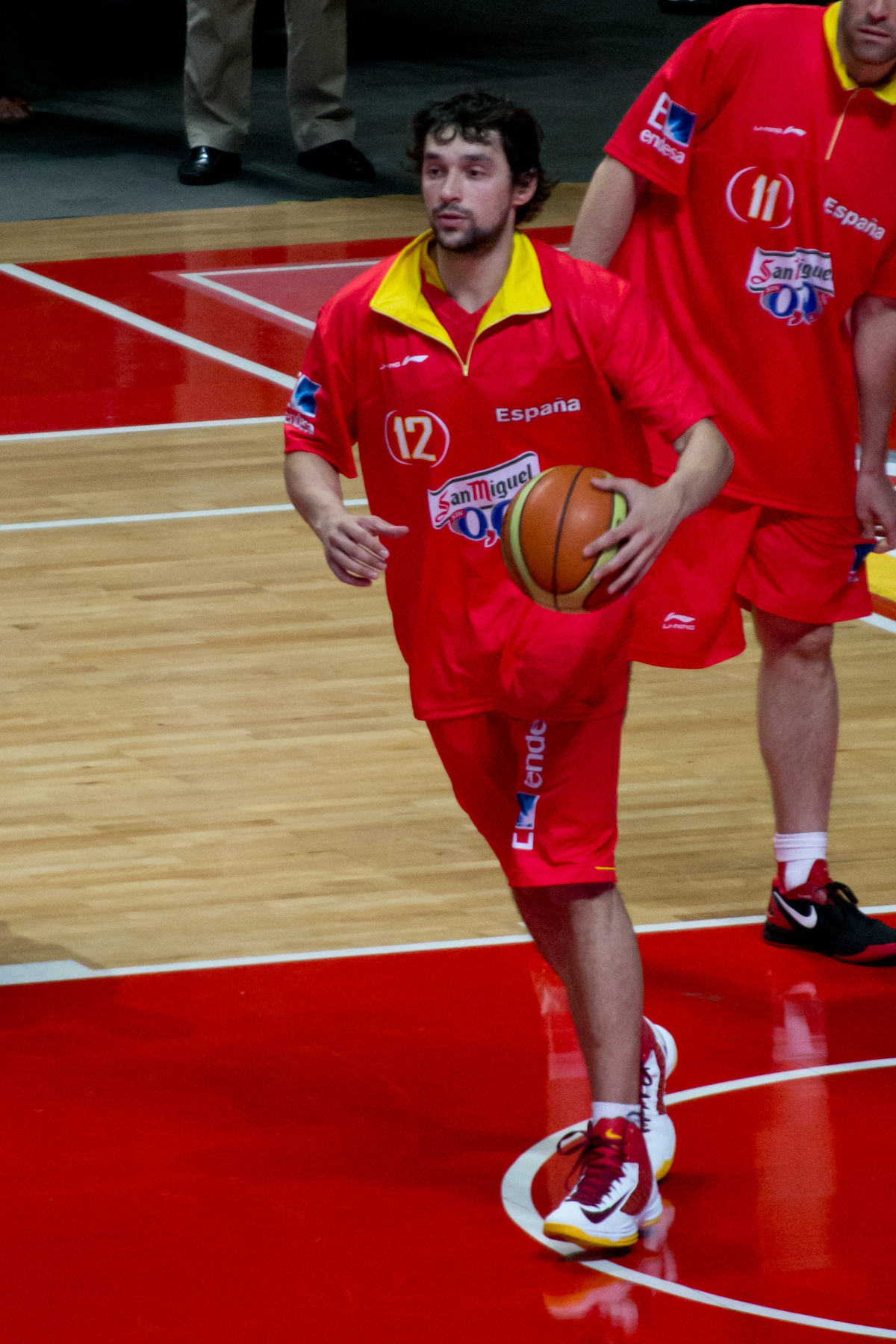
Sergio Llull was the FIBA Intercontinental Cup's MVP in 2015.

Year	Name	Position	Nationality	Club	Ref.
1977	Walt Szczerbiak	Small forward	United States	(Spain) Real Madrid	
1987	Juan San Epifanio "Epi"	Small forward	Spain	(Spain) FC Barcelona	
2013	Vassilis Spanoulis	Point guard	Greece	(Greece) Olympiacos	
2014	Nicolás Laprovíttola	Point guard	Argentina	(Brazil) Flamengo	
2015	Sergio Llull	Guard	Spain	(Spain) Real Madrid	
2016	Zach Graham	Guard/Forward	United States	(Venezuela) Guaros de Lara	
2017	Mike Tobey	Center	United States (Note: Mike Tobey became a naturalised Slovenian citizen four years later, in 2021.)	(Spain) Iberostar Tenerife	
2019	Jordan Theodore	Point guard	North Macedonia (Note: Jordan Theodore was born in the United States, but became a naturalised Macedonian citizen.)	(Greece) AEK	
2020	Marcelinho Huertas	Point guard	Brazil	(Spain) Iberostar Tenerife	
2021	Vítor Benite	Point guard	Brazil	(Spain) San Pablo Burgos	
2022	Luke Martínez	Guard	Mexico (Note: Luke Martínez was born in the United States and also holds the American nationality.)	(Brazil) Flamengo	
2023 (I)	Bruno Fitipaldo	Point guard	Uruguay (Note: Bruno Fitipaldo also holds the Italian nationality.)	(Spain) Lenovo Tenerife	
2023 (II)	David Jackson	Shooting guard	United States	(Brazil) Franca	
2024	Dylan Osetkowski	Power forward	Germany (Note: Dylan Osetkowski was born in the United States, but became a naturalised German citizen.)	(Spain) Unicaja	
2025	Tyler Kalinoski	Shooting guard	United States	(Spain) Unicaja	

== Statistics ==
=== By club ===
CB Canarias holds the record for most players with a MVP award, with 3.

Nationality	Selections
(Spain) Canarias	3
(Spain) Real Madrid	2
(Brazil) Flamengo	2

=== By nationality ===
Players from the United States have won the most awards, with three players playing under the American nationality winning MVP.

Nationality	Selections
United States	5 (Note: Excluding American players naturalised as citizens of other countries.)
Brazil	2
Spain	2
Argentina	1
Germany	1
Greece	1
North Macedonia	1
Mexico	1
Uruguay	1

== See also ==
- FIBA Intercontinental Cup
