= 1977–78 FIBA European Champions Cup =

- League: FIBA European Champions Cup
- Sport: Basketball

Final
- Champions: (Spain) Real Madrid (6th title)
- Runners-up: (Italy) Mobilgirgi Varese

FIBA European Champions Cup seasons
- ← 1976–77 1978–79 →

The 1977–78 FIBA European Champions Cup was the 21st season of the European top-tier level professional basketball club competition FIBA European Champions Cup (now called EuroLeague). The Final was held at the Olympiahalle, in Munich, West Germany, on April 6, 1978. Real Madrid defeated Mobilgirgi Varese, by a result of 75–67; both teams qualified for 1978 FIBA Intercontinental Cup.

== Competition system ==
- 19 teams total (European national domestic league champions, plus the then current title holders), playing in a tournament system. 18 teams (domestic champions) entered a Quarterfinals group stage, divided into five groups and played a round-robin. The final standing was based on individual wins and defeats. In the case of a tie between two or more teams after the group stage, the following criteria were used to decide the final classification: 1) number of wins in one-to-one games between the teams; 2) basket average between the teams; 3) general basket average within the group
- The 5 group winners of the quarterfinals group stage, together with the title holders, advanced to the semifinals group stage, which was played as a single group under the same round-robin rules.
- The group winner and the runner-up of the semifinal group stage qualified for the final, which was played at a predetermined venue.

== Quarterfinals group stage ==
Key to colors
Top place in each group advance to semifinal group stage

=== Group A ===
	Team	Pld	Pts	W	L	PF	PA	PD
1.	(Italy) Mobilgirgi Varese	4	8	4	0	388	322	+66
2.	(Romania) Dinamo București	4	6	2	2	364	345	+19
3.	(Switzerland) Federale	4	4	0	4	349	434	-85

=== Group B ===
	Team	Pld	Pts	W	L	PF	PA	PD
1.	(Spain) Real Madrid	6	12	6	0	703	436	+267
2.	(West Germany) TuS 04 Leverkusen	6	10	4	2	561	537	+24
3.	(Luxembourg) T71 Dudelange	6	7	1	5	433	552	-119
4.	(Portugal) Ginásio Figueirense	6	7	1	5	454	626	-172

=== Group C ===
	Team	Pld	Pts	W	L	PF	PA	PD
1.	(France) ASVEL	4	7	3	1	376	299	+77
2.	(Bulgaria) CSKA Sofia	4	7	3	1	317	331	-14
3.	(England) Sutton & Crystal Palace	4	4	0	4	319	382	-63

=== Group D ===
	Team	Pld	Pts	W	L	PF	PA	PD
1.	(Sweden) Alvik	6	10	4	2	541	539	+2
2.	(Czechoslovakia) Zbrojovka Brno	6	10	4	2	585	557	+28
3.	(Turkey) Eczacıbaşı	6	9	3	3	504	511	-7
4.	(Austria) Shopping Centre Wien	6	7	1	5	573	596	-23

=== Group E ===
	Team	Pld	Pts	W	L	PF	PA	PD
1.	(Socialist Federal Republic of Yugoslavia) Jugoplastika	6	11	5	1	579	520	+59
2.	(Greece) Panathinaikos	6	11	5	1	528	511	+17
3.	(Hungary) Honvéd	6	7	1	5	543	576	-33
4.	(Poland) Śląsk Wrocław	6	7	1	5	508	551	-43

Automatically qualified to the semifinals group stage

- (Israel) Maccabi Elite Tel Aviv (title holder)

== Semifinals group stage ==
Key to colors
Top two places in the group advance to Final. Qualified for 1978 FIBA Intercontinental Cup.

	Team	Pld	Pts	W	L	PF	PA	PD
1.	(Spain) Real Madrid	10	17	7	3	1017	874	+133
2.	(Italy) Mobilgirgi Varese	10	16	6	4	896	852	+44
3.	(Israel) Maccabi Elite Tel Aviv	10	16	6	4	919	897	+22
4.	(France) ASVEL	10	15	5	5	914	902	+12
5.	(Socialist Federal Republic of Yugoslavia) Jugoplastika	10	15	5	5	899	962	-63
6.	(Sweden) Alvik	10	12	1	9	880	1034	-154

== Final ==
April 6, Olympiahalle, Munich

Team 1	Score	Team 2
Real Madrid (Spain)	75–67	(Italy) Mobilgirgi Varese

1977–78 FIBA European Champions Cup
Champions

Real Madrid
6th Title

== Awards ==
=== FIBA European Champions Cup Finals Top Scorer ===
- (United States) Walter Szczerbiak Sr. ( (Spain) Real Madrid)
