= Walt Szczerbiak =

American basketball player (born 1949)

- Szczerbiak playing for Real Madrid against Maccabi Tel Aviv, January 1975

Personal information
- Born: August 21, 1949 (age 77) Hamburg, West Germany
- Listed height: 6 ft 6 in (1.98 m)
- Listed weight: 210 lb (95 kg)

Career information
- High school: Saint Casimir (Pittsburgh, Pennsylvania)
- College: George Washington (1968–1971)
- NBA draft: 1971: 4th round, 65th overall pick
- Drafted by: Phoenix Suns
- Playing career: 1971–1984
- Position: Small forward
- Number: 21

Career history
- 1971–1972: Pittsburgh Condors
- 1972–1973: Wilkes-Barre Barons
- 1973–1980: Real Madrid
- 1980–1982: A.P.U. Udine
- 1983–1984: Canarias

Career highlights
- 3× FIBA Intercontinental Cup champion (1976–1978); FIBA Intercontinental Cup MVP (1977); 3× EuroLeague champion (1974, 1978, 1980); 4× Spanish League champion (1974–1977); Spanish League Top Scorer (1976); Spanish Cup winner (1977); 50 Greatest EuroLeague Contributors (2008); EBA champion (1973); All-EBA First Team (1973)
- Stats at Basketball Reference

Walter Szczerbiak Sr. (Note: Ukrainian: Волтер Щерб'як, romanized: Volter Shcherb'iak) (born Wolodymir Szczerbiak, August 21, 1949) is an American former professional basketball player. At 6 ft 6 in (1.98 m), Szczerbiak played at the small forward position.

On February 3, 2008, Szczerbiak was chosen as one of the 50 most influential personalities to European club basketball, over the previous half-century, by the EuroLeague Basketball Experts Committee.

== Early life and education ==
Born Wolodymir Szczerbiak in a Ukrainian refugee camp in Hamburg, West Germany, he received a sponsorship from a Ukrainian Catholic Church to immigrate to Pittsburgh, Pennsylvania, in December 1951. He later attended St. Basil College, a Ukrainian Catholic minor seminary in Stamford, Connecticut, where he first learned to play basketball. He later graduated from St. Casimir High School in Pittsburgh.

Szczerbiak attended George Washington University, where he played college basketball. In 1985, he was inducted into the GW Athletics Hall of Fame.

== Club career ==
After college, Szczerbiak was drafted by the Phoenix Suns, in the 4th round (14th pick, 65th overall) of the 1971 NBA draft. He was also drafted by the Dallas Chaparrals, of the American Basketball Association (ABA), in the 1971 ABA Draft.

Szczerbiak played in the ABA during the 1971–72 season, as a member of the Pittsburgh Condors. He then joined the Kentucky Colonels, who selected him in the Condors' dispersal draft, but he was later cut from Kentucky's roster.

Szczerbiak played for the Wilkes-Barre Barons of the Eastern Basketball Association (EBA) during the 1972–73 season and was selected to the All-EBA First Team.

Szczerbiak won three EuroLeague titles with the Spanish League club Real Madrid (1974, 1978, and 1980). He also won the FIBA Intercontinental Cup three times with Real Madrid (1976, 1977, and 1978). He was named the MVP of the 1977 FIBA Intercontinental Cup.

== Personal life ==
Szczerbiak was born in West Germany to Ukrainian parents who met in a refugee camp, after World War II. They later emigrated to Pittsburgh. His son Wally is a former NBA player.
