= 2015 FIBA Intercontinental Cup =

Bauru	Real Madrid
(Brazil)	(Spain)
170	181

First leg
Bauru	Real Madrid
91	90
- Date: September 25, 2015
- Venue: Ginásio do Ibirapuera, São Paulo
- MVP: (Spain) Sergio Llull

Second leg
Real Madrid	Bauru
91	79
- Date: September 27, 2015
- Venue: Ginásio do Ibirapuera, São Paulo

The 2015 FIBA Intercontinental Cup was the 25th edition of the FIBA Intercontinental Cup. The series, played with two legs, was played by EuroLeague champions Real Madrid, and FIBA Americas League champions Bauru. Both games were played in the Ginásio do Ibirapuera, based in São Paulo. The first leg was played on September 25, the second one on September 27. This was the last Intercontinental Cup to include the EuroLeague champions.

== Qualified teams ==
Team	Qualification	Qualified date	Participations (bold indicates winners)
(Spain) Real Madrid	Winners of the 2014–15 Euroleague	17 May 2015	12 (1965, 1966, 1968, 1969, 1970, 1974, 1975, **1976**, 1977, **1978**, 1980, **1981**)
(Brazil) Bauru	Winners of the 2015 FIBA Americas League	15 March 2015	Debut

== First leg ==
25 September 2015
20:00

Boxscore

**Bauru** (Brazil)	**91**–90	(Spain) Real Madrid
Scoring by quarter: 19–**22**, 11–**15**, **29**–25, **32**–28
Pts: Hettsheimeir 27; Rebs: Garcia 7 Asts: Fischer, Garcia 8		Pts: Carroll 18; Rebs: Fernández, Reyes 6 Asts: Llull 6

Ginásio do Ibirapuera, São Paulo
Attendance: 5,500
Referees: Reynaldo Mercedes (DOM); José Reyes (MEX), Christos Christodoulou (GRE)

== Second leg ==
27 September 2015
20:00

Boxscore

**Real Madrid** (Spain)	**91**–79	(Brazil) Bauru
Scoring by quarter: **24**–15, 25–25, 17–17, **25**–22
Pts: Carroll 22; Rebs: Ayón 15; Asts: Llull 6		Pts: Fischer 26; Rebs: Hettsheimeir 6 Asts: Fischer 6

Ginásio do Ibirapuera, São Paulo
Attendance: 8,000
Referees: Reynaldo Mercedes (DOM), Christos Christodoulou (GRE), José Reyes (MEX)

2015 Intercontinental Cup winners

**Real Madrid**
5th title

== MVP ==
- (Spain) Sergio Llull - ( (Spain) Real Madrid)
