= Tyler Kalinoski =

American basketball player (born 1992)

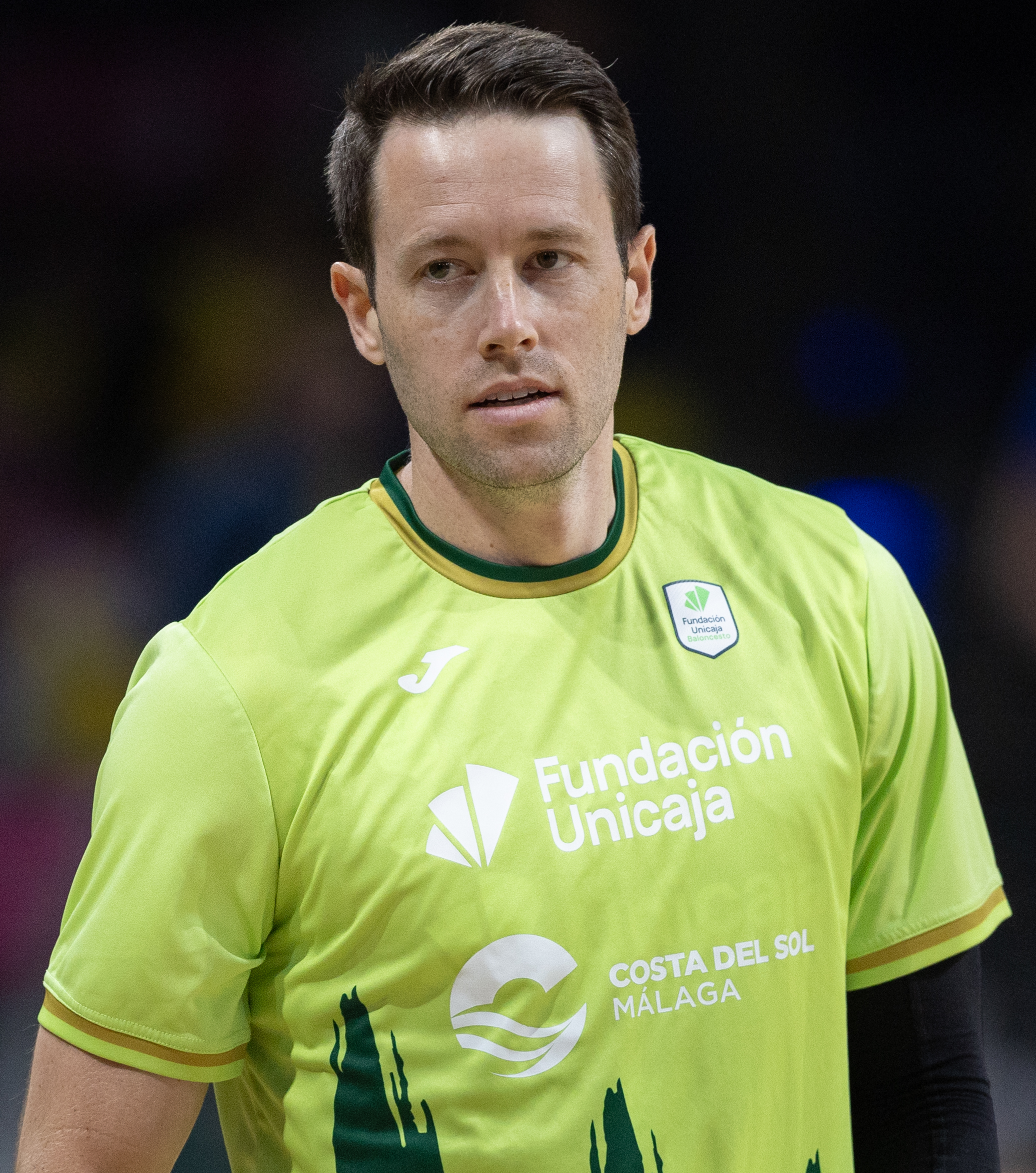
- Kalinoski in 2026

No. 4 – Unicaja Málaga
- Position: Shooting guard
- League: Liga ACB; BCL

Personal information
- Born: December 19, 1992 (age 33) Cincinnati, Ohio, U.S.
- Listed height: 6 ft 4 in (1.93 m)
- Listed weight: 181 lb (82 kg)

Career information
- High school: Olathe East (Olathe, Kansas)
- College: Davidson (2011–2015)
- NBA draft: 2015: undrafted
- Playing career: 2015–present

Career history
- 2015–2016: Élan Chalon
- 2016–2017: Apollon Patras
- 2017–2019: Antwerp Giants
- 2019–2020: Bandırma
- 2020–2021: Brescia
- 2021–2022: Río Breogán
- 2022–present: Unicaja Málaga

Career highlights
- 2× FIBA Intercontinental Cup wnner (2024, 2025); FIBA Intercontinental Cup MVP (2025); 2× FIBA Champions League champion (2024, 2025); 2× Spanish Cup winner (2023, 2025); Spanish Supercup winner (2024); Atlantic 10 Player of the Year (2015); First-team All-Atlantic 10 (2015)

Tyler Kenneth Kalinoski (born December 19, 1992) is an American professional basketball player for Unicaja Málaga of the Spanish Liga ACB and the Basketball Champions League (BCL). Kalinoski was a McDonald's All-American nominee as a senior at Olathe East High School in Kansas and completed his college career for the Davidson Wildcats. He was named Atlantic 10 Conference Men's Basketball Player of the Year in 2015.

== High school career ==
Kalinoski competed for Olathe East High School under coach Jim Super. He was named to the first-team All-Sunflower League in 2010 and 2011. As a senior, he averaged 17.1 points, 5.8 rebounds, 5.7 assists, and 2.2 steals per game, leading the team in all statistical categories. The Wichita Eagle and Topeka Capital Journal selected him to the 6A first-team all-state, and the Olathe News named him Player of the Year in his senior year. He was a McDonald's All-American nominee.

== College career ==
Kalinoski was the last player recruited by Davidson. In his freshman year in 2011–12, Kalinoski posted averages of 4.7 points, 2.2 rebounds and 1.2 assists in 17.4 minutes a game. His best game was a 17-point outing in the quarterfinals of the Southern Conference tournament against Furman, in which he knocked down five 3-pointers. As a sophomore in 2012–13, he averaged 7.6 points, 2.8 rebounds and 1.6 assists in 22.6 minutes per game. On 13 occasions he scored in double figures.

As a senior in 2014–15, Kalinoski guided Davidson to a 23–6 record and Atlantic 10 regular season championship despite being picked 12th in the preseason coaches poll. He led Davidson in scoring with 16.9 points per game and finished second on the team with 5.7 rebounds per game. On March 9, 2015, CBS Sports named Kalinoski player of the week after he scored 22 points in a win over VCU and 32 points in a win over Duquesne. At the conclusion of the regular season he was named Atlantic 10 player of the year. Kalinoski hit a buzzer-beater to prevent a La Salle victory in the quarterfinals of the Atlantic 10 Tournament, capping a 14-point comeback.

== Professional career ==
Kalinoski went undrafted in the 2015 NBA draft. On June 26, he signed with the Miami Heat to play in the 2015 NBA Summer League. "I want to seize the moment and just go out and play," he said. When Summer League ended, Miami and the Charlotte Hornets were interested in signing him as a fringe player, with the perspective of spending most of the season in the NBA D-League.

After impressing at Summer League, Kalinoski opted against trying his luck in the NBA as a fringe player or in the NBA D-League, and he joined French League club Élan Chalon.

On July 22, 2016, Kalinoski joined Apollon Patras of the Greek Basket League.

He signed with the Antwerp Giants on June 21, 2017.

On July 31, 2019, he signed a contract with Teksüt Bandırma of the Turkish Basketball Super League (BSL). He averaged 10.7 points, 3.5 rebounds and 3.2 assists per game. Kalinoski signed with Germani Basket Brescia of the Italian league on June 18, 2020.

In the summer 2021, Kalinoski signed for Breogán of the Spanish Liga ACB.

On July 9, 2022, he has signed with Unicaja of the Spanish Liga ACB.
