= 2023 FIBA Intercontinental Cup (February) =

32nd season of the FIBA Intercontinental Cup

Tournament details
- Host country: Spain
- City: San Cristóbal de La Laguna
- Dates: 10–12 February 2023
- Teams: 4
- Venue: 1

Final positions
- Champions: (Spain) Lenovo Tenerife (3rd title)
- Runners-up: (Brazil) São Paulo
- Third place: (United States) Rio Grande Valley Vipers
- Fourth place: (Tunisia) US Monastir

Tournament statistics
- Games played: 4
- MVP: Bruno Fitipaldo (Lenovo Tenerife)
- Top scorer: Jarrett Culver (Rio Grande Valley Vipers) (45 total points)

Official website
- Link

The 2023 FIBA Intercontinental Cup was the 32nd edition of the FIBA Intercontinental Cup. The tournament was held on 10 and 12 February 2023 in San Cristóbal de La Laguna, on the Spanish island of Tenerife. It was the third time that the tournament is held in Tenerife after 2017 and 2020.

Canarias (known as Lenovo Tenerife for sponsorship reasons) won its third Intercontinental Cup title after defeating São Paulo in the final. Bruno Fitipaldo was named the MVP. Rio Grande Valley Vipers came in third place, US Monastir in the fourth.

== Teams ==
Location of teams of the 2023 FIBA Intercontinental Cup Tenerife

On December 6, 2021, FIBA announced the champions of the 2022 FIBA Asia Champions Cup would be added to the competition. The tournament was to be expanded from four to at least five teams. It would be the first time an Asian club participated since 1985. However, the Asia Champions Cup was cancelled due to the COVID-19 pandemic, and no team participated.

Team	Qualification	Qualified date	Participations (bold indicates winners)	Ref.
–	~~Winners of the 2022 FIBA Asia Champions Cup~~	Competition cancelled	–	–
(Tunisia) US Monastir	Winners of the 2022 BAL season	28 May 2022	Debut	
(Brazil) São Paulo	Winners of the 2021–22 BCL Americas	9 April 2022	Debut	
(United States) Rio Grande Valley Vipers	Winners of the 2021–22 NBA G League season	14 April 2022	1 (2020)	
(Spain) Lenovo Tenerife	Winners of the 2021–22 Basketball Champions League (host)	7 May 2022	2 (**2017, 2020**)	

== Venue ==
2023 FIBA Intercontinental Cup (February) (Spain, Canary Islands)
San Cristóbal de La Laguna
Santiago Martín
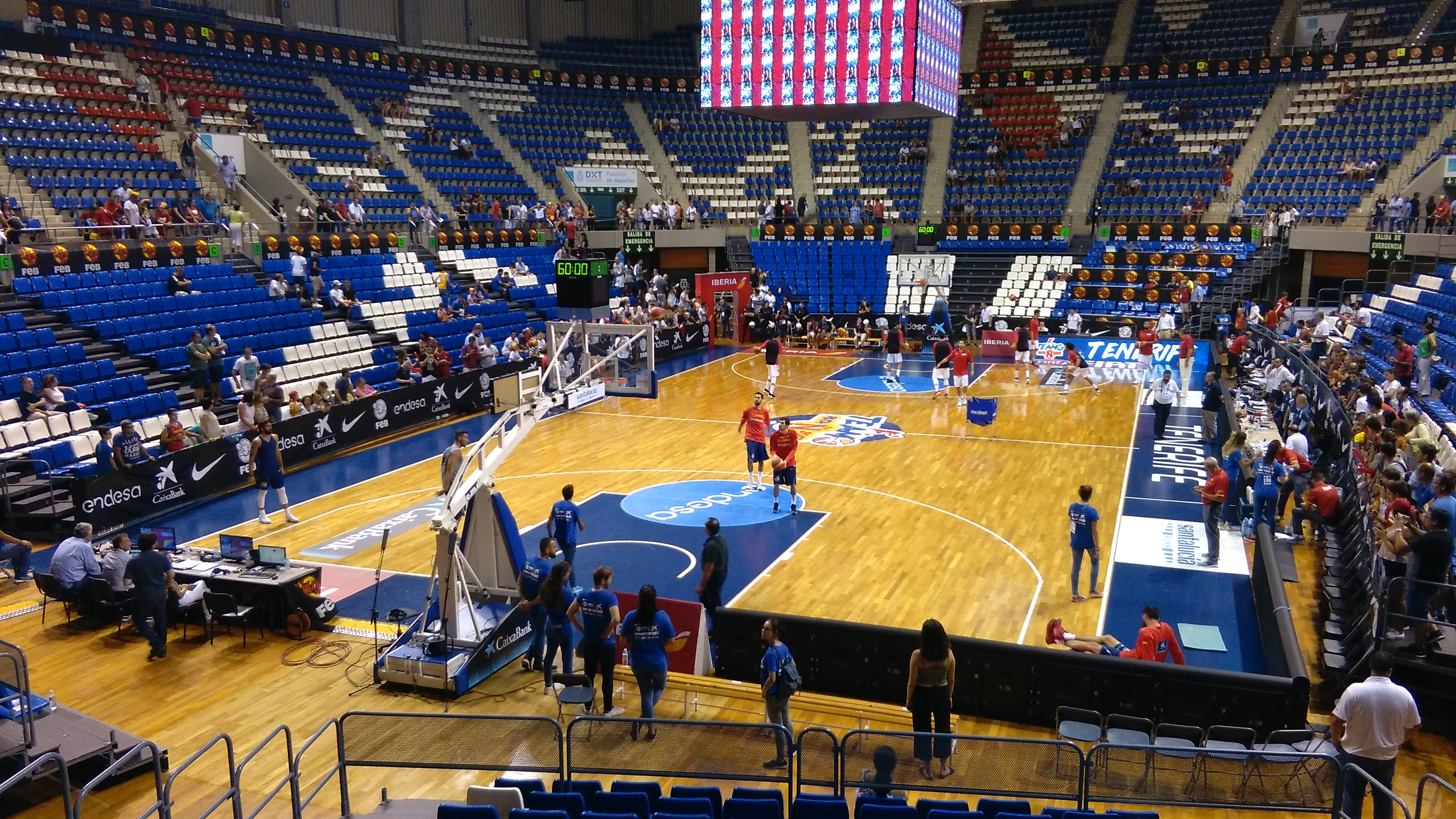
Capacity: 5,100

== Draw ==
The draw for the semi-final pairings was held on 13 January 2023 in the building of the Cabildo Insular de Tenerife, the governing body of Tenerife.

== Results ==
=== Bracket ===
Semi-finals
10 February
(United States) Rio Grande Valley Vipers	70
(Brazil) São Paulo	91
10 February
(Spain) Lenovo Tenerife	112
(Tunisia) US Monastir	42

Final
12 February
(Brazil) São Paulo	68
(Spain) Lenovo Tenerife	89
Third place
12 February
(United States) Rio Grande Valley Vipers	107
(Tunisia) US Monastir	84

=== Semi-finals ===
10 February 2023	Rio Grande Valley Vipers (United States)	70–91	(Brazil) São Paulo	San Cristóbal de La Laguna
18:00 (UTC±0)	Scoring by quarter: 18–24, 12–22, 14–22, 26–23
	Pts: Occeus 17; Rebs: Culver 12; Asts: Heron 3	Boxscore	Pts: Miller 24; Rebs: Da Silva 15; Asts: Corazza 10	Arena: Santiago Martín Arena; Referees: Julio Anaya (PAN), Gatis Saliņš (LAT), Boris Krejić (SLO)

10 February 2023	Lenovo Tenerife (Spain)	112–42	(Tunisia) US Monastir	San Cristóbal de La Laguna
21:00 (UTC±0)	Scoring by quarter: 25–6, 27–10, 31–11, 29–15
	Pts: Abromaitis 20; Rebs: Diagne 11; Asts: Huertas 7	Boxscore	Pts: Randle 14; Rebs: Marnaoui 5 Asts: Ghyaza 3	Arena: Santiago Martín Arena; Attendance: 4,062; Referees: Manuel Mazzoni (ITA), Scott Beker (AUS), Juan Fernández (ARG)

=== Third place game ===
12 February 2023	Rio Grande Valley Vipers (United States)	107–84	(Tunisia) US Monastir	San Cristóbal de La Laguna
16:00 (UTC±0)	Scoring by quarter: 32–20, 31–17, 24–18, 20–29
	Pts: Culver 34; Rebs: Stanley 5 Asts: Lecque 7	Boxscore	Pts: Marnaoui 19; Rebs: Lahiani 8 Asts: Marnaoui 3	Arena: Santiago Martín Arena; Referees: Manuel Mazzoni (ITA), Ahmed Al-Shuwaili (IRQ), Jean Ruhamiriza (RWA)

=== Final ===
12 February 2023	São Paulo (Brazil)	68–89	(Spain) Lenovo Tenerife	San Cristóbal de La Laguna
19:00 (UTC±0)	Scoring by quarter: 19–25, 16–18, 18–22, 15–24
	Pts: Coelho 18; Rebs: Da Silva 12; Asts: Coelho, Corazza 4	Boxscore	Pts: Fitipaldo, Salin 15; Rebs: Doornekamp 9 Asts: Fitipaldo 6	Arena: Santiago Martín Arena; Attendance: 4,887; Referees: Julio Anaya (PAN), Scott Beker (AUS), Gatis Saliņš (LAT)
