= Dylan Osetkowski =

American basketball player (born 1996)

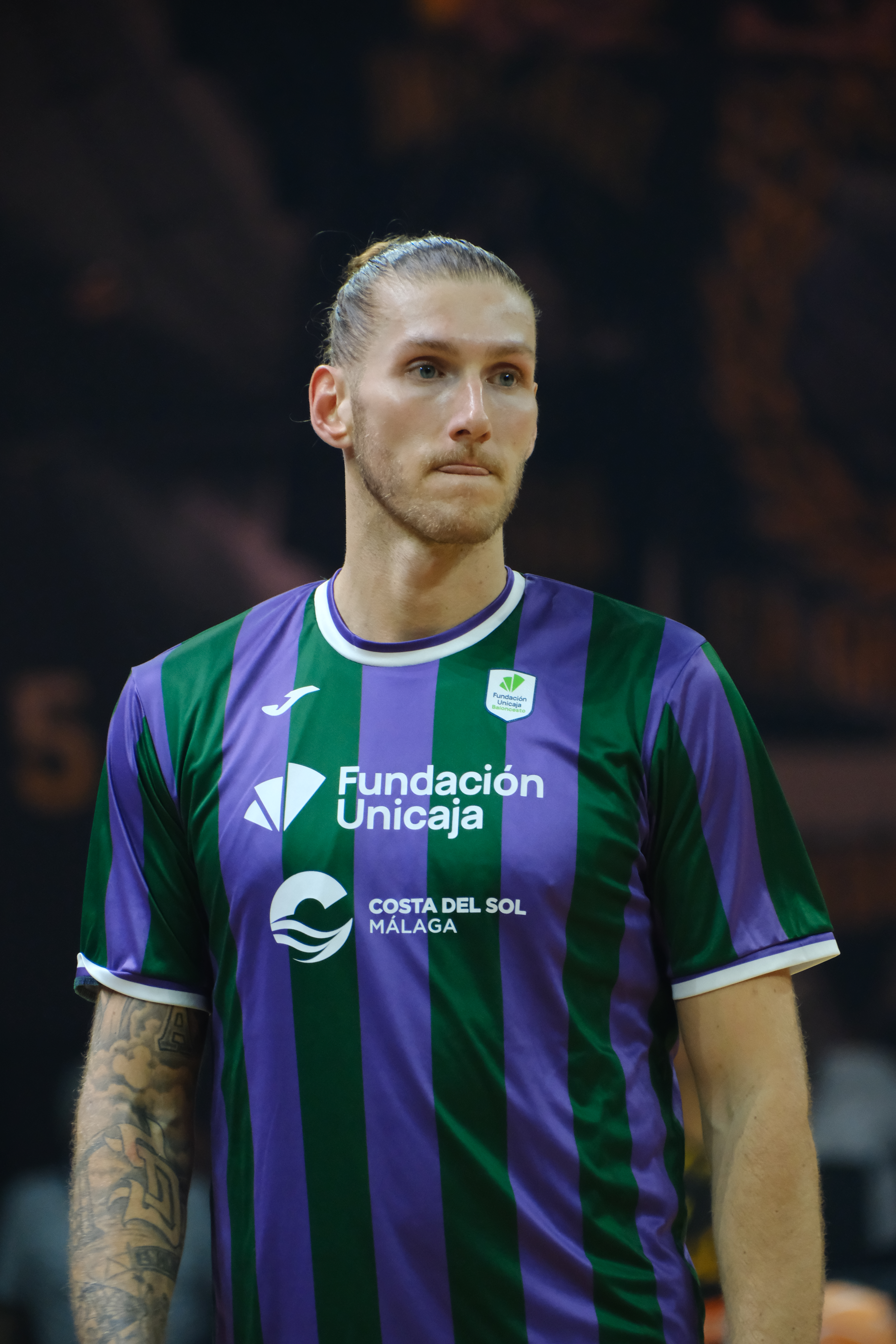
- Osetkowski with Unicaja in 2025

No. 8 – Valencia Basket
- Position: Power forward
- League: Liga ACB; EuroLeague

Personal information
- Born: August 8, 1996 (age 30) San Diego, California, U.S.
- Listed height: 6 ft 9 in (2.06 m)
- Listed weight: 240 lb (109 kg)

Career information
- High school: JSerra Catholic (San Juan Capistrano, California)
- College: Tulane (2014–2016); Texas (2017–2019)
- NBA draft: 2019: undrafted
- Playing career: 2019–present

Career history
- 2019–2021: Ratiopharm Ulm
- 2019–2020: →BG Göttingen
- 2021–2022: ASVEL
- 2022–2025: Unicaja
- 2025–2026: Partizan
- 2026–present: Valencia

Career highlights
- FIBA Intercontinental Cup champion (2024); FIBA Intercontinental Cup MVP (2024); 2× FIBA Champions League champion (2024, 2025); All-FIBA Champions League First Team (2025); All-FIBA Champions League Second Team (2024); All-Liga ACB First Team (2024); 2× Spanish Cup winner (2023, 2025); Spanish Supercup winner (2024); French League champion (2022); NIT MVP (2019)

Dylan Osetkowski (born August 8, 1996) is a German-American professional basketball player for Valencia Basket of the Liga ACB and the EuroLeague. He played college basketball for the Texas Longhorns and the Tulane Green Wave.

== High school career ==
Osetkowski played basketball for JSerra Catholic High School in San Juan Capistrano, California. As a senior, he averaged 14.8 points and 9.9 rebounds per game and was a first-team All-Trinity League selection. He led his team to the CIF Southern Section Division 4AA championship, scoring 16 points in the title game. Osetkowski received strong interest from only two NCAA Division I programs out of high school, Tulane and UC Irvine. He committed to Tulane on July 12, 2014.

== College career ==
As a freshman for Tulane, Osetkowski averaged 6.3 points and 4.8 rebounds per game. He was placed in a more important role in his sophomore season, averaging 11.3 points and 8.3 rebounds per game and registering 11 double-doubles. After the season, Osetkowski transferred to Texas and sat out the next season due to National Collegiate Athletic Association transfer rules. In his junior season, he averaged a team-high 13.4 points and 7.2 rebounds per game and was an honorable mention All-Big 12 Conference selection. As a senior, Osetkowski averaged 11.1 points, 7.2 rebounds and 1.4 steals per game. He led Texas to the National Invitational Tournament title and was named most valuable player of the competition. In the first round of the NIT, Osetkowski scored a career-high 26 points in a 79-73 win over South Dakota State.

== Professional career ==
=== ratiopharm Ulm (2019–2021) ===
Osetkowski played for the Cleveland Cavaliers at 2019 NBA Summer League. He signed his first professional contract with ratiopharm Ulm of the Basketball Bundesliga (BBL) and was immediately loaned to BG Göttingen, with whom he averaged 12.6 points and 6.2 rebounds per game in the BBL.

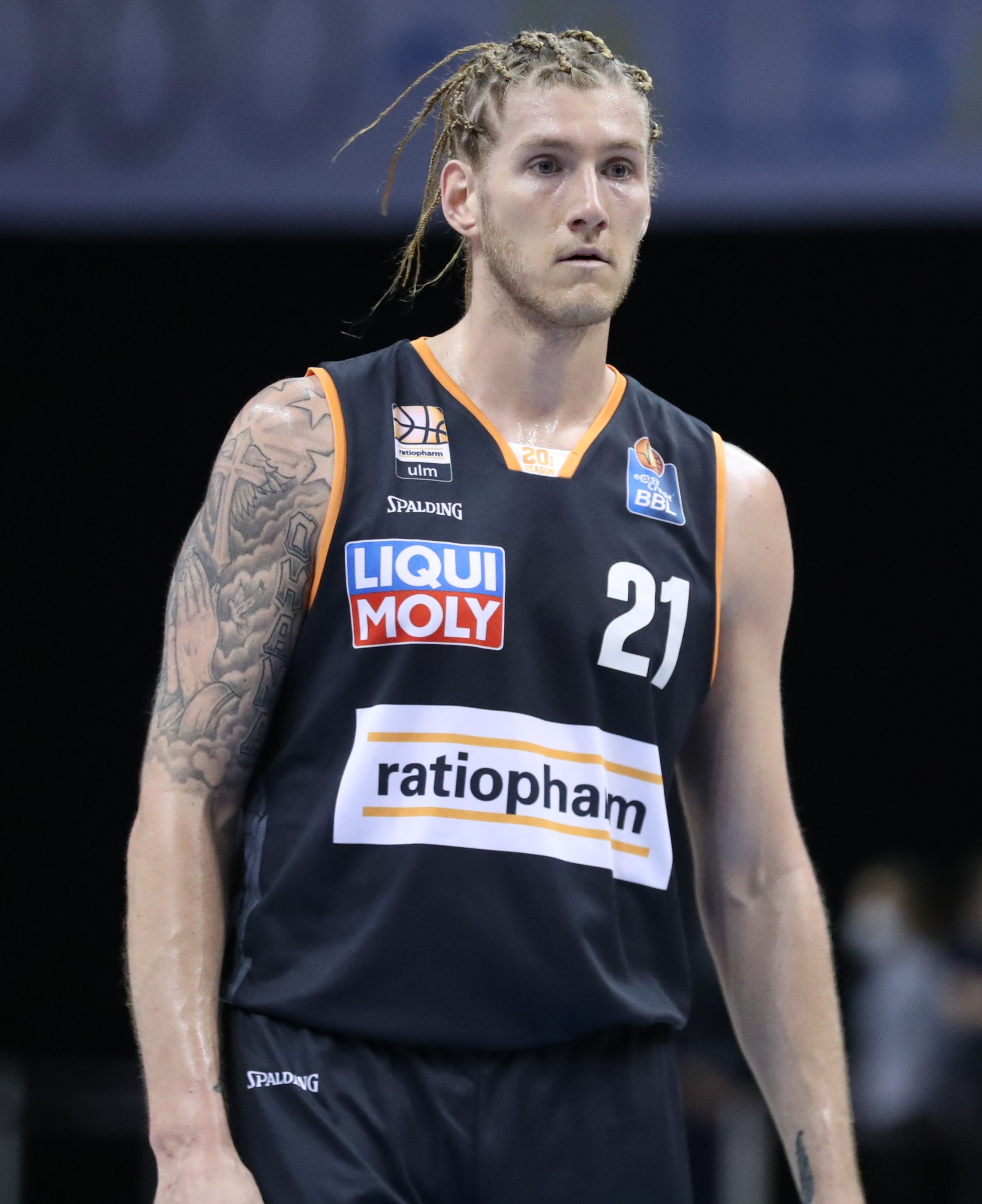
Osetkowski with Ulm in 2021

On May 22, 2020, Osetkowski returned to ratiopharm Ulm and began his two-year contract with the club. On November 12, he was named EuroCup player of the week after contributing 32 points and seven rebounds in a victory over Pallacanestro Brescia. He finished the season averaging 17.9 points, 5.3 rebounds, 2.8 assists and 1.0 steals (21.8 point PIR) in the EuroCup, and 13.2 points, 5.6 rebounds, 2.5 assists and 1.2 steals in the BBL.

=== ASVEL (2021–2022) ===
On July 14, 2021, Osetkowski inked a two-year deal with current French champs and Euroleague team ASVEL Basket.

=== Unicaja (2022–2025) ===
On July 2, 2022, Osetkowski signed with Unicaja from Málaga of the Spanish Liga ACB. On September 15, 2024, he won the 2024 FIBA Intercontinental Cup with Unicaja, and was named the Intercontinental Cup MVP following his final performance, after leading all scorers in the final with 15 points, and averaging 11.7 points and 5 rebounds over the tournament.

=== Partizan (2025–2026) ===
On June 27, 2025, Osetkowski signed with Partizan Mozzart Bet of the Serbian League (KLS), ABA League and the EuroLeague.

On February 13, 2026, he was suspended until further notice by the Spanish anti-doping agency due to a positive marijuana test from 2023. The ban was suspended on February 18.

=== Valencia (2026–present) ===
On July 5, 2026, Osetkowski signed a two–year deal with Valencia Basket of the Liga ACB.

== National team career ==
Osetkowski is eligible to play for the senior men's German national team.

== Career statistics ==
Legend
GP	Games played	GS	Games started	MPG	Minutes per game
FG%	Field-goal percentage	3P%	3-point field-goal percentage	FT%	Free-throw percentage
RPG	Rebounds per game	APG	Assists per game	SPG	Steals per game
BPG	Blocks per game	PPG	Points per game	PIR	Performance index rating
**Bold**	Career high

=== EuroLeague ===
Year	Team	GP	GS	MPG	FG%	3P%	FT%	RPG	APG	SPG	BPG	PPG	PIR
2021–22	ASVEL	26	15	19.3	.402	.312	.811	3.1	0.6	1.0	0.2	6.0	6.2
Career		26	15	19.3	.402	.312	.811	3.1	0.6	1.0	0.2	6.0	6.2

=== College ===
Year	Team	GP	GS	MPG	FG%	3P%	FT%	RPG	APG	SPG	BPG	PPG
2014–15	Tulane	7	0	14.3	.708	.000	.636	4.0	1.0	0.0	0.1	5.9
2015–16	Tulane	33	33	32.3	.438	.273	.672	8.4	1.5	1.2	0.5	11.2
2016–17	Texas	Redshirt										
2017–18	Texas	34	34	35.2	.400	.288	.721	7.2	1.2	1.0	0.2	13.4
2018–19	Texas	33	33	28.6	.438	.319	.730	7.2	1.2	1.4	0.4	10.9
Career		107	100	29.8	.444	.289	.690	7.4	1.3	1.1	0.3	10.3

== Personal life ==
Osetkowski's older brother, Cory, played college basketball for Columbia and set the program record for career games played. In May 2020, Osetkowski announced that he received German citizenship.
