= 1983 FIBA Intercontinental Cup =

- League: FIBA Intercontinental Cup
- Sport: Basketball
- Finals champions: (Argentina) Obras Sanitarias
- Runners-up: (Italy) Jollycolombani Cantù

FIBA Intercontinental Cup seasons
- ← 1982 FIBA Intercontinental Cup 1984 FIBA Intercontinental Cup →

The 1983 FIBA Intercontinental Cup William Jones was the 17th edition of the FIBA Intercontinental Cup for men's basketball clubs and the 16th edition of the tournament in the form of a true intercontinental cup. The competition began on September 20 and ended September 24, 1983.

The edition took place at the Estadio Obras Sanitarias in Buenos Aires, Argentina. Hosts Obras Sanitarias won their inaugural title and were the first club from Argentina to win the Intercontinental Cup.

== Participants ==
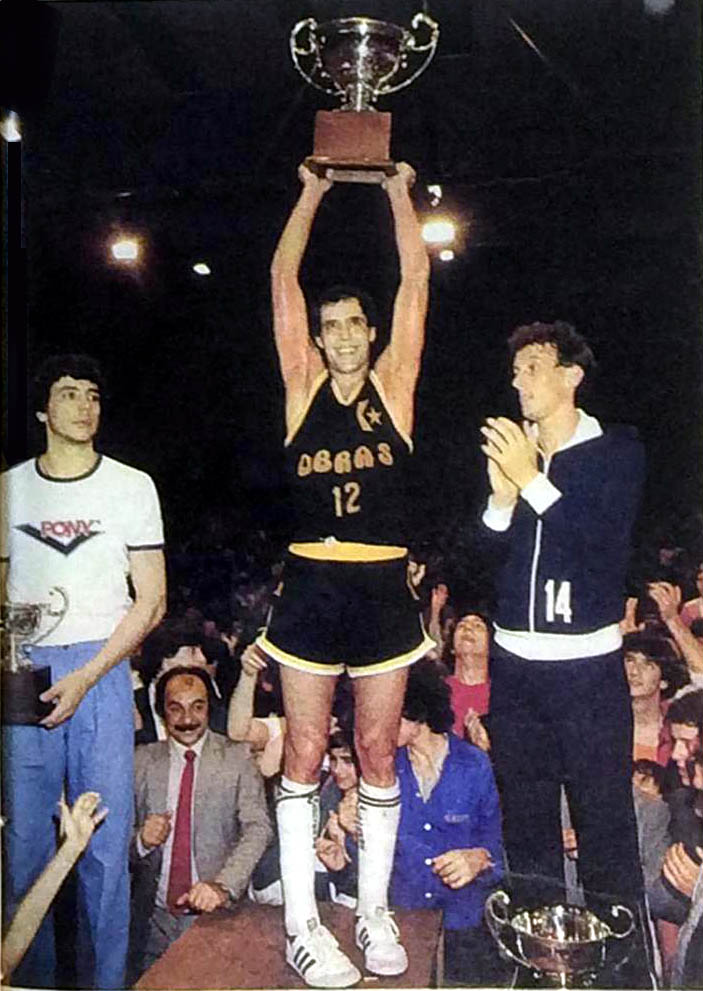
Obras Sanitarias' captain, Eduardo Cadillac, raising the Intercontinental Cup

Continent	Teams	Clubs		
South America	3	(Uruguay) Peñarol	(Brazil) Monte Líbano	(Argentina) Obras Sanitarias
Europe	2	(Italy) Jollycolombany Cantù	(Italy) Simac Milano	
North America	1	(United States) Oregon State Beavers		

== League stage ==
Day 1, September 20, 1983

Team 1	Score	Team 2
Jollycolombany Cantù (Italy)	92–74	(Uruguay) Peñarol
Monte Líbano (Brazil)	81–65	(Italy) Simac Milano
Obras Sanitarias (Argentina)	92–77	(United States) Oregon State Beavers

Day 2, September 21, 1983

Team 1	Score	Team 2
Simac Milano (Italy)	97–92	(Uruguay) Peñarol
Oregon State Beavers (United States)	76–75	(Italy) Jollycolombany Cantù
Obras Sanitarias (Argentina)	91–86	(Brazil) Monte Líbano

Day 3, September 22, 1983

Team 1	Score	Team 2
Monte Líbano (Brazil)	68–65	(United States) Oregon State Beavers
Jollycolombany Cantù (Italy)	88–82	(Italy) Simac Milano
Obras Sanitarias (Argentina)	104–81	(Uruguay) Peñarol

Day 4, September 23, 1983

Team 1	Score	Team 2
Peñarol (Uruguay)	91–73	(United States) Oregon State Beavers
Jollycolombany Cantù (Italy)	82–81	(Brazil) Monte Líbano
Obras Sanitarias (Argentina)	84–75	(Italy) Simac Milano

Day 5, September 24, 1983

Team 1	Score	Team 2
Simac Milano (Italy)	90–75	(United States) Oregon State Beavers
Peñarol (Uruguay)	110–99	(Brazil) Monte Líbano
Obras Sanitarias (Argentina)	89–76	(Italy) Jollycolombany Cantù

== Final standings ==
	Team	Pld	Pts	W	L	PF	PA
1.	(Argentina) Obras Sanitarias	5	10	5	0	460	395
2.	(Italy) Jollycolombani Cantù	5	8	3	2	413	402
3.	(Uruguay) Peñarol	5	7	2	3	448	465
4.	(Brazil) Monte Líbano	5	7	2	3	415	413
5.	(Italy) Simac Milano	5	7	2	3	409	420
6.	(United States) Oregon State Beavers	5	6	1	4	366	416

1983 Intercontinental Champions

Obras Sanitarias
1st title
