= 1987 FIBA Club World Cup =

- League: FIBA Club World Cup
- Sport: Basketball
- Cup MVP: (Spain) "Epi"
- Finals champions: (Italy) Tracer Milano
- Runners-up: (Spain) FC Barcelona

FIBA Club World Cup seasons
- ← 1986 FIBA Club World Cup 1996 FIBA Intercontinental Cup →

The 1987 FIBA Club World Cup took place at PalaTrussardi, Milan. It was the 21st edition of the FIBA Intercontinental Cup for men's basketball clubs. It was the fourth edition of the competition that was held under the name of FIBA Club World Cup. From the FIBA European Champions Cup participated Tracer Milano, Maccabi Elite, Cibona, Žalgiris, and FC Barcelona. From the South American Club Championship participated Monte Líbano, and Ferro Carril Oeste. Representing the Division I (NCAA) was the State of Washington NCAA All-Stars Team.

== Participants ==
Continent	Teams	Clubs				
Europe	5	(Italy) Tracer Milano	(Israel) Maccabi Elite	(Socialist Federal Republic of Yugoslavia) Cibona	(Spain) FC Barcelona	(Soviet Union) Žalgiris
South America	2	(Brazil) Monte Líbano	(Argentina) Ferro Carril Oeste			
North America	1	(United States) Washington All-Stars				

== Group stage ==
=== Group A ===
	Team	Pld	Pts	W	L	PF	PA
1.	(Spain) FC Barcelona	3	6	3	0	345	287
2.	(Italy) Tracer Milano	3	5	2	1	301	282
3.	(Argentina) Ferro Carril Oeste	3	4	1	2	263	308
4.	(United States) Washington All-Stars	3	3	0	3	293	325

Day 1, September 15, 1987

Team 1	Score	Team 2
FC Barcelona (Spain)	121–103	(United States) Washington All-Stars
Tracer Milano (Italy)	99–77	(Argentina) Ferro Carril Oeste

Day 2, September 16, 1987

Team 1	Score	Team 2
Ferro Carril Oeste (Argentina)	93–87	(United States) Washington All-Stars

Day 3, September 17, 1987

Team 1	Score	Team 2
Tracer Milano (Italy)	91–102	(Spain) FC Barcelona

Day 4, September 18, 1987

Team 1	Score	Team 2
Ferro Carril Oeste (Argentina)	93–122	(Spain) FC Barcelona
Tracer Milano (Italy)	111–103	(United States) Washington All-Stars

=== Group B ===
	Team	Pld	Pts	W	L	PF	PA
1.	(Socialist Federal Republic of Yugoslavia) Cibona	3	6	3	0	314	283
2.	(Israel) Maccabi Elite	3	5	2	1	284	280
3.	(Brazil) Monte Líbano	3	4	1	2	268	279
4.	(Soviet Union) Žalgiris	3	3	0	3	310	334

Day 1, September 15, 1987

Team 1	Score	Team 2
Maccabi Elite (Israel)	92–72	(Brazil) Monte Líbano

Day 2, September 16, 1987

Team 1	Score	Team 2
Maccabi Elite (Israel)	83–101	(Socialist Federal Republic of Yugoslavia) Cibona
Monte Líbano (Brazil)	109–90	(Soviet Union) Žalgiris

Day 3, September 17, 1987

Team 1	Score	Team 2
Maccabi Elite (Israel)	109–107	(Soviet Union) Žalgiris
Monte Líbano (Brazil)	87–97	(Socialist Federal Republic of Yugoslavia) Cibona

Day 4, September 18, 1987

Team 1	Score	Team 2
Cibona (Socialist Federal Republic of Yugoslavia)	116–113	(Soviet Union) Žalgiris

== Places 5-8 ==
=== 7th place game ===
September 19, 1987

Team 1	Score	Team 2
Washington All-Stars (United States)	126–122	(Soviet Union) Žalgiris

=== 5th place game ===
September 20, 1987

Team 1	Score	Team 2
Ferro Carril Oeste (Argentina)	94–119	(Brazil) Monte Líbano

== Places 1-4 ==
=== Semi finals ===
September 19, 1987

Team 1	Score	Team 2
FC Barcelona (Spain)	95–87	(Israel) Maccabi Elite
Cibona (Socialist Federal Republic of Yugoslavia)	83–94	(Italy) Tracer Milano

=== 3rd place game ===
September 20, 1987

Team 1	Score	Team 2
Maccabi Elite (Israel)	96–106	(Socialist Federal Republic of Yugoslavia) Cibona

=== Final ===
20 September 1987
19:00

Boxscore^{[usurped]}

Tracer Olimpia (Italy)	100–84	(Spain) FC Barcelona
Scoring by half: 49–39, 51–45
Pts: Bob McAdoo 25; Rebs: Rickey Brown 13; Asts: Mike D'Antoni 4		Pts: Chicho Sibilio 15; Rebs: Steve Trumbo 9 Asts: Nacho Solozábal 3

Palatrussardi, Milan, Italy
Attendance: 7,000
Referees: Kostas Rigas (Greece), Yvan Mainini (France)

== Final standings ==
	Team
Gold medal	(Italy) Tracer Milano
Silver medal	(Spain) FC Barcelona
Bronze medal	(Socialist Federal Republic of Yugoslavia) Cibona
4.	(Israel) Maccabi Elite
5.	(Brazil) Monte Líbano
6.	(Argentina) Ferro Carril Oeste
7.	(United States) Washington All-Stars
8.	(Soviet Union) Žalgiris

== MVP (Best Player Award) ==
- (Spain) Juan Antonio San Epifanio ("Epi") - ( (Spain) FC Barcelona)
