= 1986 FIBA Club World Cup =

- League: FIBA Club World Cup
- Sport: Basketball
- Finals champions: (Soviet Union) Žalgiris
- Runners-up: (Argentina) Ferro Carril Oeste

FIBA Club World Cup seasons
- ← 1985 FIBA Club World Cup 1987 FIBA Club World Cup →

The 1986 FIBA Club World Cup took place at Córdoba and Buenos Aires, Argentina. It was the 20th edition of the FIBA Intercontinental Cup for men's basketball clubs. It was the third edition of the competition that was held under the name of FIBA Club World Cup.

== Participants ==
Continent	Teams	Clubs			
South America	4	(Brazil) Monte Líbano	(Argentina) Ferro Carril Oeste	(Argentina) Obras Sanitarias	(Brazil) Corinthians
Europe	2	(Socialist Federal Republic of Yugoslavia) Cibona	(Soviet Union) Žalgiris		
North America	2	(Puerto Rico) Cariduros de Fajardo	(United States) Continental-Coors All-Stars		

== Group stage ==
=== Group A ===
	Team	Pld	Pts	W	L	PF	PA
1.	(Socialist Federal Republic of Yugoslavia) Cibona	3	6	3	0	351	261
2.	(Brazil) Corinthians	3	5	2	1	333	316
3.	(Argentina) Obras Sanitarias	3	4	1	2	284	343
4.	(United States) Continental-Coors All-Stars	3	3	0	3	307	355

Day 1, September 9, 1986, Buenos Aires

Team 1	Score	Team 2
Cibona (Socialist Federal Republic of Yugoslavia)	114–87	(Brazil) Corinthians
Obras Sanitarias (Argentina)	108–107	(United States) Continental-Coors All-Stars

Day 2, September 10, 1986, Buenos Aires

Team 1	Score	Team 2
Cibona (Socialist Federal Republic of Yugoslavia)	127–82	(United States) Continental-Coors All-Stars
Corinthians (Brazil)	126–84	(Argentina) Obras Sanitarias

Day 3, September 11, 1986, Buenos Aires

Team 1	Score	Team 2
Corinthians (Brazil)	120–118	(United States) Continental-Coors All-Stars
Cibona (Socialist Federal Republic of Yugoslavia)	110–92	(Argentina) Obras Sanitarias

=== Group B ===
	Team	Pld	Pts	W	L	PF	PA
1.	(Argentina) Ferro Carril Oeste	3	5	2	1	260	261
2.	(Soviet Union) Žalgiris	3	5	2	1	264	267
3.	(Puerto Rico) Cariduros de Fajardo	3	4	1	2	248	259
4.	(Brazil) Monte Líbano	3	4	1	2	250	235

Day 1, September 9, 1986, Córdoba

Team 1	Score	Team 2
Ferro Carril Oeste (Argentina)	90–80	(Puerto Rico) Cariduros de Fajardo
Žalgiris (Soviet Union)	83–81	(Brazil) Monte Líbano

Day 2, September 10, 1986, Córdoba

Team 1	Score	Team 2
Cariduros de Fajardo (Puerto Rico)	81–75	(Brazil) Monte Líbano
Ferro Carril Oeste (Argentina)	99–87	(Soviet Union) Žalgiris

Day 3, September 11, 1986, Córdoba

Team 1	Score	Team 2
Žalgiris (Soviet Union)	94–87	(Puerto Rico) Cariduros de Fajardo
Monte Líbano (Brazil)	94–91	(Argentina) Ferro Carril Oeste

== Places 5-8 ==
=== Semi finals ===
September 13, 1986, Buenos Aires

Team 1	Score	Team 2
Obras Sanitarias (Argentina)	76–129	(Brazil) Monte Líbano
Cariduros de Fajardo (Puerto Rico)	102–116	(United States) Continental-Coors All-Stars

=== 7th & 5th place games ===
September 14, 1986, Buenos Aires

Team 1	Score	Team 2
Obras Sanitarias (Argentina)	90–110	(Puerto Rico) Cariduros de Fajardo
Monte Líbano (Brazil)	00–00	(United States) Continental-Coors All-Stars

== Places 1-4 ==
=== Semi finals ===
September 13, 1986, Buenos Aires

Team 1	Score	Team 2
Cibona (Socialist Federal Republic of Yugoslavia)	77–104	(Soviet Union) Žalgiris
Ferro Carril Oeste (Argentina)	103–84	(Brazil) Corinthians

=== 3rd place game ===
September 14, 1986, Buenos Aires

Team 1	Score	Team 2
Cibona (Socialist Federal Republic of Yugoslavia)	119–96	(Brazil) Corinthians

=== Final ===
14 September 1986	Žalgiris (Soviet Union)	84–78	(Argentina) Ferro Carril Oeste	Buenos Aires
	Scoring by half: 45–46, 39–32
	Pts: Sabonis 26	Boxscore	Pts: Cortijo 24	Arena: Estadio Obras Sanitarias; Attendance: 5,930; Referees: Richard Steeves (CAN), Victor García (COL)

1986 Intercontinental Champions

Žalgiris
1st title

== Final standings ==
	Team
Gold medal	(Soviet Union) Žalgiris
Silver medal	(Argentina) Ferro Carril Oeste
Bronze medal	(Socialist Federal Republic of Yugoslavia) Cibona
4.	(Brazil) Corinthians
5.	(Brazil) Monte Líbano
6.	(United States) Continental-Coors All-Stars
7.	(Puerto Rico) Cariduros de Fajardo
8.	(Argentina) Obras Sanitarias
