= 2025 FIBA Intercontinental Cup =

35th edition of the FIBA Intercontinental Cup in 2025

Tournament details
- Host country: Singapore
- City: Singapore
- Dates: 18–21 September
- Teams: 6
- Venue: 1

Final positions
- Champions: (Spain) Unicaja (2nd title)
- Runners-up: (USA Basketball) NBA G League United
- Third place: (Libya) Al Ahli Tripoli
- Fourth place: (Brazilian Basketball Confederation) Flamengo

Tournament statistics
- Games played: 9
- MVP: Tyler Kalinoski (Unicaja)
- Top scorer: Jaden Shackelford (NBA G League United, 21.0 ppg)

Official website
- 2025 FIBA Intercontinental Cup

The 2025 FIBA Intercontinental Cup was the 35th edition of the FIBA Intercontinental Cup. The tournament was hosted at the Singapore Indoor Stadium for a third consecutive year under a three-year agreement with the Singaporean government. It was the third time the tournament was hosted in Asia.

Unicaja were the defending champions, and defeated NBA G League United by a score of 71–61, to win their second championship.

== Teams ==
The list of teams was confirmed by FIBA on 17 July 2025.

Location of teams of the 2025 FIBA Intercontinental Cup

Team	Qualification	Date of qualification	Participations (bold indicates winners)	Ref.
(Basketball Australia) Illawarra Hawks	Winners of the 2024–25 NBL season	23 March 2025	Debut	
(Brazilian Basketball Confederation) Flamengo	Winners of the 2024–25 Basketball Champions League Americas	19 April 2025	3 (**2014**, 2019, **2022**)	
(Spain) Unicaja	Winners of the 2024–25 Basketball Champions League	11 May 2025	1 (**2024**)	
(Japan) Utsunomiya Brex	Winners of the 2025 Basketball Champions League Asia	13 June 2025	Debut	
(Libya) Al Ahli Tripoli	Winners of the 2025 BAL season	14 June 2025	Debut	
(USA Basketball) NBA G League United	Representative of the NBA G League	17 July 2025	1 (2024)	

== Group stage ==
All times are local (UTC+08:00)

=== Group A ===
Pos	Team	Pld	W	L	PF	PA	PD	Pts	Qualification
1	(Spanish Basketball Federation) Unicaja	2	2	0	170	129	+41	**4**	Advance to final
2	(Libyan Arab Basketball Federation) Al Ahli Tripoli	2	1	1	148	151	−3	**3**	Qualification to third place game
3	(Japan Basketball Association) Utsunomiya Brex	2	0	2	146	184	−38	**2**	Qualification to fifth place game

Source: FIBA

18 September
20:00

Boxscore

Al Ahli Tripoli (Libyan Arab Basketball Federation)	61–**73**	(Spanish Basketball Federation) **Unicaja**
Scoring by quarter: 10–**16**, 18–18, 15–**21**, 18–18
Pts: Almeida 21; Rebs: Almeida 9 Asts: Badrush 3		Pts: Pérez 16; Rebs: Díaz 6 Asts: three players 4

Singapore Indoor Stadium
Attendance: 1,783
Referees: Roberto Vázquez (PUR), Yann Vézo Davidson (MAD), Carlos Vélez (COL)

19 September
20:00

Boxscore

Utsunomiya Brex (Japan Basketball Association)	68–**97**	(Spanish Basketball Federation) **Unicaja**
Scoring by quarter: 20–**23**, 13–**18**, 20–**35**, 15–**21**
Pts: Newbill 21; Rebs: Newbill 8 Asts: Newbill 8		Pts: Kalinoski 19; Rebs: Kravish 6 Asts: Perry 8

Singapore Indoor Stadium
Attendance: 2,871
Referees: Mārtiņš Kozlovskis (LAT), Yener Yılmaz (TUR), Waseem Husainy (CAN)

20 September
20:00

Boxscore

**Al Ahli Tripoli** (Libyan Arab Basketball Federation)	**87**–78	(Japan Basketball Association) Utsunomiya Brex
Scoring by quarter: **21**–14, 14–**22**, **27**–23, **25**–19
Pts: Romero 21; Rebs: Romero 15; Asts: Knight 6		Pts: Newbill 28; Rebs: Jerrett 6 Asts: Newbill 7

Singapore Indoor Stadium
Attendance: 3,201
Referees: Luis Castillo (ESP), James Griguol (AUS), Yann Vézo Davidson (MAD)

=== Group B ===
Pos	Team	Pld	W	L	PF	PA	PD	Pts	Qualification
1	(USA Basketball) NBA G League United	2	2	0	193	185	+8	**4**	Advance to final
2	(Brazilian Basketball Confederation) Flamengo	2	1	1	175	175	0	**3**	Qualification to third place game
3	(Basketball Australia) Illawarra Hawks	2	0	2	176	184	−8	**2**	Qualification to fifth place game

Source: FIBA

18 September
17:00

Boxscore

**NBA G League United** (USA Basketball)	**93**–91	(Brazilian Basketball Confederation) Flamengo
Scoring by quarter: **19**–16, **19**–13, **29**–27, 26–**35**
Pts: Hunt 24; Rebs: Hunt 9 Asts: Hunt 7		Pts: Deodato, Johnson 20; Rebs: Deodato, Johnson 5 Asts: Johnson, Borges 5

Singapore Indoor Stadium
Attendance: 1,547
Referees: Luis Castillo (ESP), Mārtiņš Kozlovskis (LAT), James Griguol (AUS)

19 September
17:00

Boxscore

Illawarra Hawks (Basketball Australia)	82–**84** (OT)	(Brazilian Basketball Confederation) **Flamengo**
Scoring by quarter: 13–**20**, **18**–8, 19–**25**, **23**–20, Overtime: 9–**11**
Pts: Harvey 24; Rebs: Bolden 11; Asts: Bolden, McLaughlin 2		Pts: Borges 22; Rebs: Cummings, Borges 9 Asts: Borges 8

Singapore Indoor Stadium
Attendance: 2,569
Referees: Roberto Vázquez (PUR), Carlos Vélez (COL), Sun Jian (CHN)

20 September
17:00

Boxscore

**NBA G League United** (USA Basketball)	**100**–94	(Basketball Australia) Illawarra Hawks
Scoring by quarter: 24–**25**, **27**–20, 22–**23**, **27**–26
Pts: Shackelford 26; Rebs: Williams 9 Asts: Randle 4		Pts: Harvey 32; Rebs: McGee 10; Asts: McLaughlin 5

Singapore Indoor Stadium
Attendance: 2,285
Referees: Mārtiņš Kozlovskis (LAT), Yener Yılmaz (TUR), Waseem Husainy (CAN)

== Final round ==
=== Fifth place game ===
21 September
13:00

Boxscore

Utsunomiya Brex (Japan Basketball Association)	69–**93**	(Basketball Australia) **Illawarra Hawks**
Scoring by quarter: 14–**26**, 13–**26**, 15–**20**, **27**–21
Pts: Ishikawa 15; Rebs: Takeuchi, Aoki 6 Asts: five players 2		Pts: McLaughlin 15; Rebs: Yates 9 Asts: McDowell-White, Froling 4

Singapore Indoor Stadium
Attendance: 2,147
Referees: Roberto Vázquez (PUR), Waseem Husainy (CAN), Sun Jian (CHN)

=== Third place game ===
21 September
16:00

Boxscore

**Al Ahli Tripoli** (Libyan Arab Basketball Federation)	**95**–85	(Brazilian Basketball Confederation) Flamengo
Scoring by quarter: **26**–22, 13–**22**, **25**–21, **31**–20
Pts: Maker, Almeida 21; Rebs: Maker 12; Asts: Knight 9		Pts: Deodato, Cummings 14; Rebs: Johnson 5 Asts: Borges 8

Singapore Indoor Stadium
Attendance: 3,710
Referees: Luis Castillo (ESP), Carlos Vélez (COL), Yener Yılmaz (TUR)

=== Final ===
21 September
19:00

Boxscore

**Unicaja** (Spanish Basketball Federation)	**71**–61	(USA Basketball) NBA G League United
Scoring by quarter: 11–**21**, **22**–15, **23**–5, 15–**20**
Pts: Tillie 14; Rebs: Webb 8 Asts: Perry 5		Pts: Shackelford 17; Rebs: Hunt 11; Asts: Hunt 3

Singapore Indoor Stadium
Attendance: 6,217
Referees: Mārtiņš Kozlovskis (LAT), James Griguol (AUS), Yann Vézo Davidson (MAD)

== Final standings ==
Rank	Team	Record
1st place, gold medalist(s)	(Spanish Basketball Federation) Unicaja	3–0
2nd place, silver medalist(s)	(USA Basketball) NBA G League United	2–1
3rd place, bronze medalist(s)	(Libyan Arab Basketball Federation) Al Ahli Tripoli	2–1
4	(Brazilian Basketball Confederation) Flamengo	1–2
5	(Basketball Australia) Illawarra Hawks	1–2
6	(Japan Basketball Association) Utsunomiya Brex	0–3
