= Palatrussardi =

Indoor arena in Milan

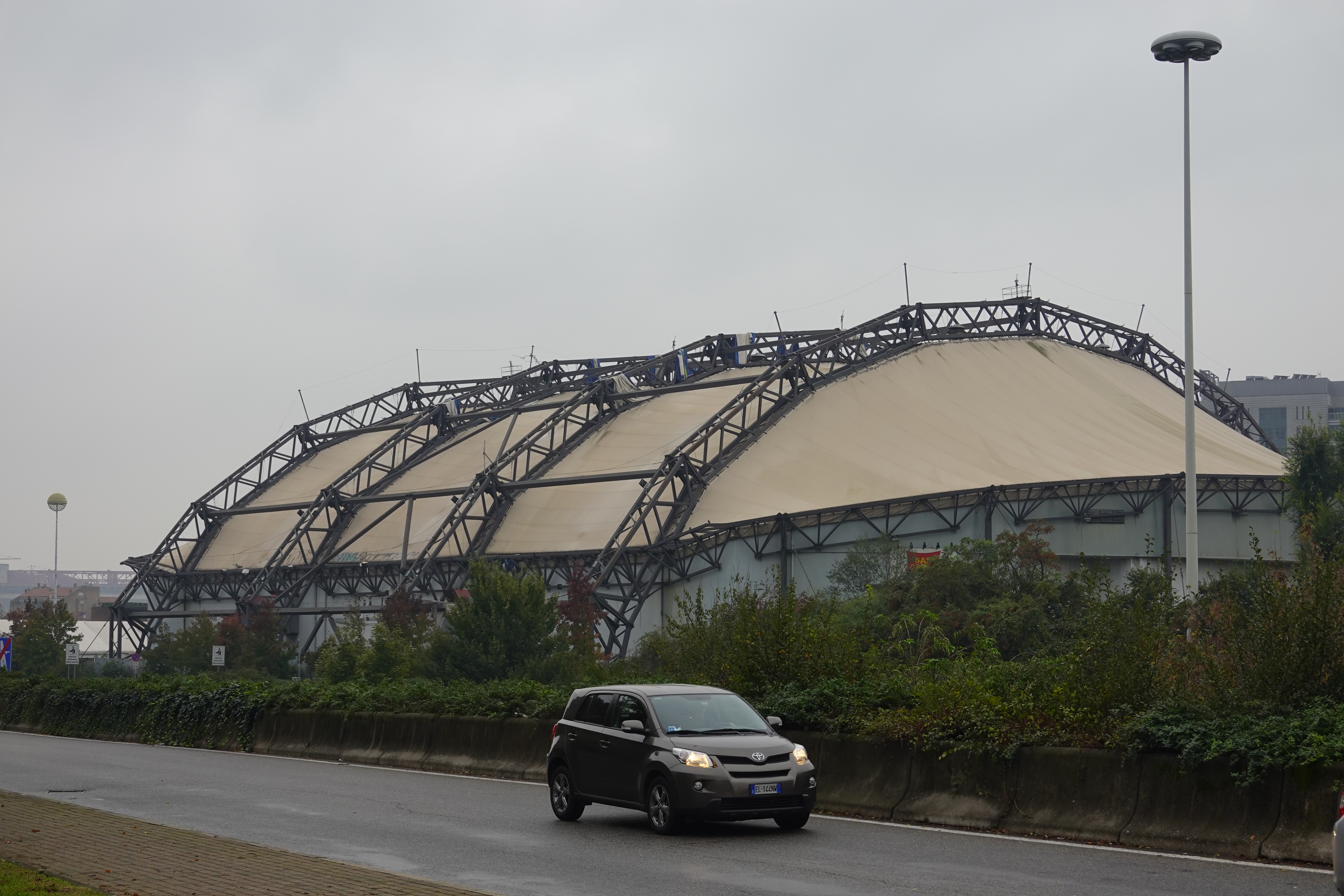
- Interactive map of Palatrussardi
- Former names: Palatrussardi (1986–1996); PalaVobis (1996–2002); PalaTucker (2002); Mazda Palace (2002–2007); PalaSharp (2007–2013)
- Location: Via Antonio Sant'Elia, 33 20151 Milan, Italy
- Coordinates: 45°29′29″N 9°7′45″E
- Capacity: 8,479

Construction
- Built: 1985–1986
- Opened: September 26, 1986
- Closed: 2011

Tenant
- Olimpia Milano (1986–1990)

Website
- Official Site

PalaTrussardi, later known as PalaVobis, PalaTucker, Mazda Palace and PalaSharp, was an indoor arena located in Milan, Italy. The seating capacity was 8,479 and it hosted concerts and sporting events. It was built in 1985 to replace two pre-existing structures, the Sport Palace and the Palatenda.

The arena hosted the 1987 Basketball Intercontinental Cup in which local Philips Milano defeated FC Barcelona and won the competition.

== Naming right history ==
When opened in 1986, it was named after Nicola Trussardi, a local fashion designer and entrepreneur.

Other naming rights deals included computer company Vobis (1996–2002), automobile emissions control company Tucker and Mazda automotive manufacturer.

The arena was lastly under an agreement with Sharp electronics corporation, in effect since 2007.

== Gallery ==
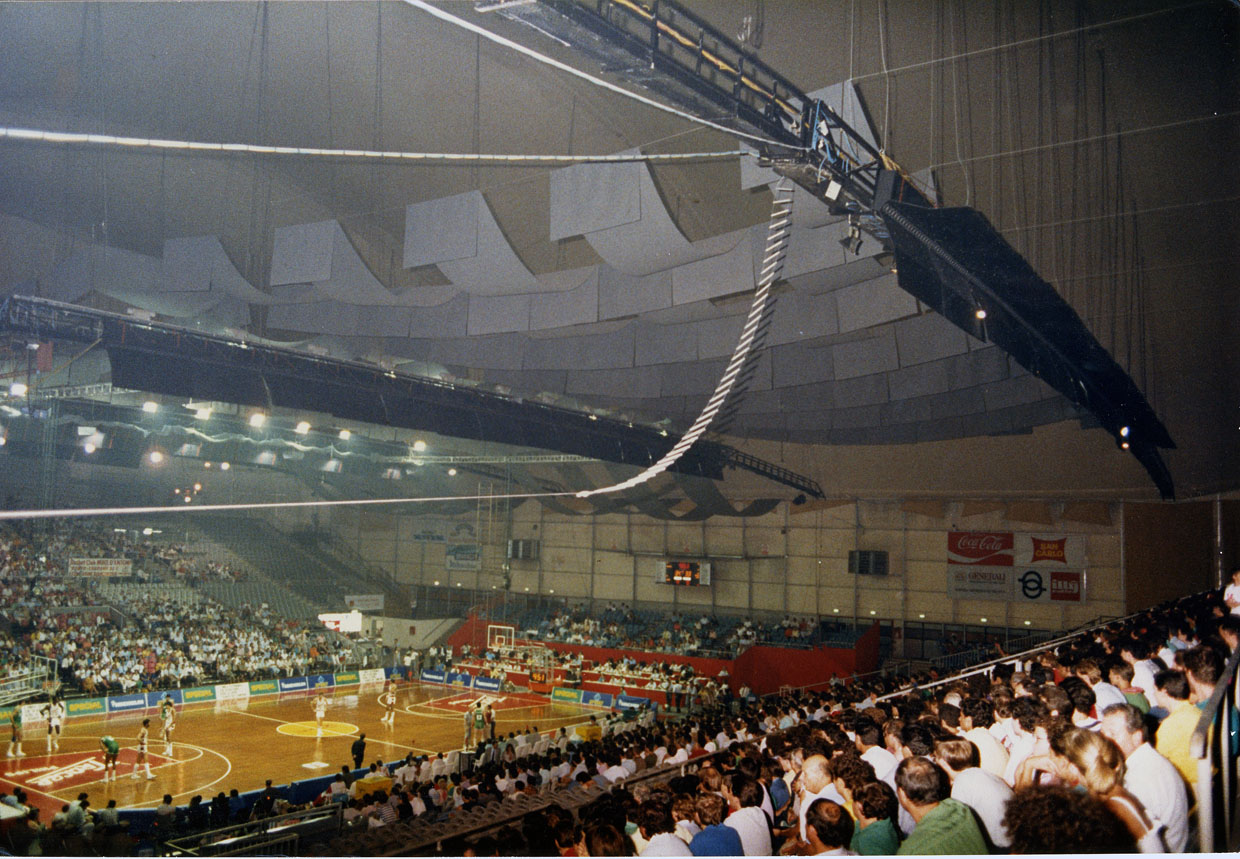
PalaTrussardi during an Olimpia Milano basketball game

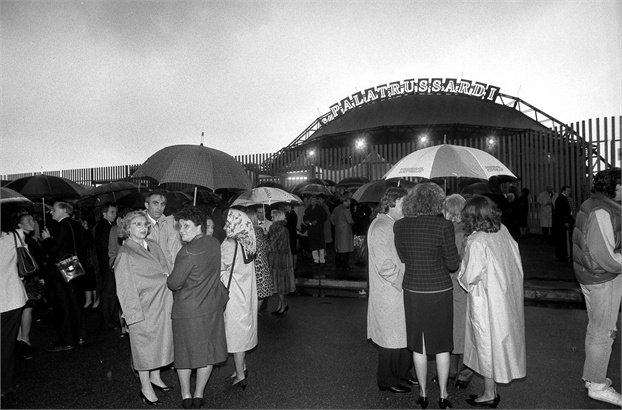
PalaTrussardi outside in the 80s

== 2026 Winter Olympics ==
It was considered to renovate it and use it for ice hockey, along with PalaItalia Santa Giulia, during the 2026 Winter Olympics. This option was later discarded.

Preceded by Estadio Obras Sanitarias; Buenos Aires	FIBA Intercontinental Cup; Final Venue; 1987	Succeeded by Newell's Old Boys; Rosario / O.A.C.A. Indoor Hall; Maroussi, Athens
