= 1977 FIBA Intercontinental Cup =

- League: FIBA Intercontinental Cup
- Sport: Basketball
- Cup MVP: (United States) Walter Szczerbiak Sr.
- Finals champions: (Spain) Real Madrid
- Runners-up: (Italy) Mobilgirgi Varèse

FIBA Intercontinental Cup seasons
- ← 1976 FIBA Intercontinental Cup 1978 FIBA Intercontinental Cup →

The 1977 FIBA Intercontinental Cup William Jones was the 11th edition of the FIBA Intercontinental Cup for men's basketball clubs. It took place at Pabellón de la Ciudad Deportiva del Real Madrid, Madrid. From the FIBA European Champions Cup participated Real Madrid as host club and title holder, Mobilgirgi Varèse, and Maccabi Elite as European Champions. From the South American Club Championship participated Atlética Francana.

Dragones de Tijuana took part from the Mexican Basketball Circuit, and from the Division I (NCAA) participated the Providence Friars.

== Participants ==
Continent	Teams	Clubs		
Europe	3	(Israel) Maccabi Elite	(Italy) Mobilgirgi Varèse	(Spain) Real Madrid
North America	2	(United States) Providence Friars	(Mexico) Dragones de Tijuana	
South America	1	(Brazil) Atlética Francana		

== League stage ==
Day 1, October 4, 1977

Team 1	Score	Team 2
Mobilgirgi Varèse (Italy)	104–87	(Mexico) Dragones de Tijuana
Atlética Francana (Brazil)	94–113	(Spain) Real Madrid
Providence Friars (United States)	80–106	(Israel) Maccabi Elite

Day 2, October 5, 1977

Team 1	Score	Team 2
Dragones de Tijuana (Mexico)	88–112	(Brazil) Atlética Francana
Real Madrid (Spain)	105–97	(Israel) Maccabi Elite
Mobilgirgi Varèse (Italy)	99–89	(United States) Providence Friars

Day 3, October 6, 1977

Team 1	Score	Team 2
Providence Friars (United States)	85–82	(Brazil) Atlética Francana
Dragones de Tijuana (Mexico)	105–129	(Spain) Real Madrid
Mobilgirgi Varèse (Italy)	108–100	(Israel) Maccabi Elite

Day 4, October 7, 1977

Team 1	Score	Team 2
Providence Friars (United States)	92–96	(Mexico) Dragones de Tijuana
Real Madrid (Spain)	115–94	(Italy) Mobilgirgi Varèse
Atlética Francana (Brazil)	98–101	(Israel) Maccabi Elite

Day 5, October 8, 1977

Team 1	Score	Team 2
Maccabi Elite (Israel)	126–94	(Mexico) Dragones de Tijuana
Mobilgirgi Varèse (Italy)	87–98	(Brazil) Atlética Francana
Real Madrid (Spain)	103–90	(United States) Providence Friars

== Final standings ==
	Team	Pld	Pts	W	L	PF	PA
1.	(Spain) Real Madrid	5	10	5	0	565	480
2.	(Italy) Mobilgirgi Varèse	5	8	3	2	492	489
3.	(Israel) Maccabi Elite	5	8	3	2	530	485
4.	(Brazil) Atlética Francana	5	7	2	3	484	474
5.	(Mexico) Dragones de Tijuana	5	6	1	4	470	563
6.	(United States) Providence Friars	5	6	1	4	436	486

1977 Intercontinental Champions

Real Madrid
2nd title

== Awards ==
=== Europe's Five ===
- (Spain) Juan Antonio Corbalán - ( (Spain) Real Madrid)
- (Spain) Wayne Brabender - ( (Spain) Real Madrid)
- (United States) Walter Szczerbiak Sr. - ( (Spain) Real Madrid)
- (United States) Bob Morse - ( (Italy) Mobilgirgi Varèse)
- (United States) Aulcie Perry - ( (Israel) Maccabi Elite)

=== America's Five ===
- (United States) Dwight Williams - ( (United States) Providence Friars)
- (United States) Paul McCracken - ( (Mexico) Dragones de Tijuana)
- (Mexico) Arturo Guerrero - ( (Mexico) Dragones de Tijuana)
- (United States) Bruce Campbell - ( (United States) Providence Friars)
- (Brazil) Adilson de Freitas - ( (Brazil) Atlética Francana)

=== MVP ===
- (United States) Walter Szczerbiak Sr. - ( (Spain) Real Madrid)
