= 2020 FIBA Intercontinental Cup =

- Season: 2020
- Dates: 7–9 February 2020
- Games played: 4
- Teams: 4

Regular season
- Season MVP: (Brazil) Marcelo Huertas (Iberostar Tenerife)

Finals
- Champions: (Spain) Iberostar Tenerife (2nd title)
- Runners-up: (Italy) Virtus Segafredo Bologna

The 2020 FIBA Intercontinental Cup was the 29th edition of the FIBA Intercontinental Cup. The tournament was held on 7 and 9 February 2020 in San Cristóbal de La Laguna, on the Spanish island of Tenerife. It was the second time in three years the tournament is held in Tenerife after 2017.

== Format ==
Like other years, the tournament was held under a Final Four format, played by four teams, and included a third-place game.

== Teams ==
Location of teams of the 2020 FIBA Intercontinental Cup

The tournament was contested by four teams. For the second time, the National Basketball Association (NBA) opted to send the NBA G League champions, rather than the NBA champions.

Team	Qualification	Qualified date	Participations (bold indicates winners)
(Argentina) San Lorenzo de Almagro	Winners of the 2019 FIBA Americas League	31 March 2019	1 (2019)
(Italy) Virtus Segafredo Bologna	Winners of the 2018–19 Basketball Champions League	5 May 2019	Debut
(United States) Rio Grande Valley Vipers	Winners of the 2018–19 NBA G League	12 April 2019	Debut
(Spain) Iberostar Tenerife	Host team	12 December 2019	1 (**2017**)

== Venue ==
2020 FIBA Intercontinental Cup (Spain, Canary Islands)
San Cristóbal de La Laguna
Santiago Martín
Capacity: 5,100

== Results ==
=== Bracket ===
Semifinals
7 February
**(Italy) Virtus Segafredo Bologna**	**75**
(Argentina) San Lorenzo de Almagro	57
7 February
**(Spain) Iberostar Tenerife**	**110**
(United States) Rio Grande Valley Vipers	89

Final
9 February
(Italy) Virtus Segafredo Bologna	72
**(Spain) Iberostar Tenerife**	**80**
Third place game
9 February
**(Argentina) San Lorenzo de Almagro**	**96**
(United States) Rio Grande Valley Vipers	90

=== Semifinals ===
7 February 2020	**Virtus Segafredo Bologna** (Italy)	**75**–57	(Argentina) San Lorenzo de Almagro	San Cristóbal de La Laguna
18:30 (UTC)	Scoring by quarter: **23**−10, 8−**17**, **21**−15, **23**−15
	Pts: Hunter 16; Rebs: Ricci 10; Asts: Marble, Marković 4	Boxscore	Pts: Tucker 16; Rebs: Batista, Fjellerup 5 Asts: Batista, González 3	Arena: Santiago Martín Arena; Referees: Jorge Vázquez (PUR), Matthew Kallio (CAN), Mārtiņš Kozlovskis (LAT)

7 February 2020	**Iberostar Tenerife** (Spain)	**110**–89	(United States) Rio Grande Valley Vipers	San Cristóbal de La Laguna
21:00 (UTC)	Scoring by quarter: **26**−24, **25**−24, 19−**20**, **40**−21
	Pts: Yusta 31; Rebs: Shermadini 8 Asts: Huertas 9	Boxscore	Pts: Brown 15; Rebs: Martin 6 Asts: Taylor, Thornwell 7	Arena: Santiago Martín Arena; Referees: Aleksandar Glišić (SRB), Omar Bermúdez (MEX), Georgios Poursanidis (GRE)

=== Third place game ===
9 February 2020	**San Lorenzo de Almagro** (Argentina)	**96**–90	(United States) Rio Grande Valley Vipers	San Cristóbal de La Laguna
16:30 (UTC)	Scoring by quarter: **27**−19, 18−**29**, **21**−20, **30**−22
	Pts: Tucker 21; Rebs: Mata 8 Asts: Aguirre 7	Boxscore	Pts: Taylor 19; Rebs: Martin 10; Asts: Roach, Taylor 4	Arena: Santiago Martín Arena; Referees: Antonio Conde (ESP), Omar Bermúdez (MEX), Mārtiņš Kozlovskis (LAT)

=== Final ===
9 February 2020	Virtus Segafredo Bologna (Italy)	72–**80**	(Spain) **Iberostar Tenerife**	San Cristóbal de La Laguna
19:00 (UTC)	Scoring by quarter: 11−**16**, 21−**26**, 22−**25**, **18**−13
	Pts: Teodosić 15; Rebs: Ricci 8 Asts: Teodosić 8	Boxscore	Pts: Huertas 23; Rebs: Shermadini, White 7 Asts: three players 3	Arena: Santiago Martín Arena; Referees: Jorge Vázquez (PUR), Aleksandar Glišić (SRB), Matthew Kallio (CAN)
