= 1982 FIBA Intercontinental Cup =

- Season: 1982
- Dates: 27 September – 3 October
- Games played: 15
- Teams: 6

Finals
- Champions: (Italy) Ford Cantù (2nd title)
- Runners-up: (Netherlands) Nashua EBBC

The 1982 FIBA Intercontinental Cup William Jones was the 16th edition of the FIBA Intercontinental Cup for men's basketball clubs and the 15th edition of the tournament in the form of a true intercontinental cup. It took place at Amsterdam, Rotterdam and Den Bosch, Netherlands.

== Participants ==
Continent	Teams	Clubs			
Europe	4	(Italy) Ford Cantù	(Israel) Maccabi Elite	(Netherlands) Nashua EBBC	(Netherlands) Elmex Leiden
North America	1	(United States) Air Force Falcons			
South America	1	(Argentina) Ferro Carril Oeste			

== League stage ==
Day 1, September 27, 1982, Den Bosch

Team 1	Score	Team 2
Nashua EBBC (Netherlands)	81–84	(United States) Air Force Falcons
Elmex Leiden (Netherlands)	68–81	(Argentina) Ferro Carril Oeste

Day 2, September 28, 1982, Rotterdam

Team 1	Score	Team 2
Elmex Leiden (Netherlands)	75–92	(Italy) Ford Cantù
Maccabi Elite (Israel)	100–88	(Argentina) Ferro Carril Oeste

Day 3, September 29, 1982, Den Bosch

Team 1	Score	Team 2
Nashua EBBC (Netherlands)	71–64	(Netherlands) Elmex Leiden
Maccabi Elite (Israel)	73–76	(Italy) Ford Cantù

Day 4, September 30, 1982, Amsterdam

Team 1	Score	Team 2
Nashua EBBC (Netherlands)	97–77	(Argentina) Ferro Carril Oeste
Maccabi Elite (Israel)	103–100	(United States) Air Force Falcons

Day 5, October 1, 1982, Rotterdam

Team 1	Score	Team 2
Elmex Leiden (Netherlands)	95–86	(United States) Air Force Falcons
Ferro Carril Oeste (Argentina)	75–102	(Italy) Ford Cantù

Day 6, October 2, 1982, Den Bosch

Team 1	Score	Team 2
Elmex Leiden (Netherlands)	79–92	(Israel) Maccabi Elite
Air Force Falcons (United States)	82–74	(Argentina) Ferro Carril Oeste
Nashua EBBC (Netherlands)	68–70	(Italy) Ford Cantù

Day 7, October 3, 1982, Den Bosch

Team 1	Score	Team 2
Maccabi Elite (Israel)	77–86	(Netherlands) Nashua EBBC
Air Force Falcons (United States)	67–72	(Italy) Ford Cantù

== Final standings ==
	Team	Pld	Pts	W	L	PF	PA
1.	(Italy) Ford Cantù	5	10	5	0	412	358
2.	(Netherlands) Nashua EBBC	5	8	3	2	403	372
3.	(Israel) Maccabi Elite	5	8	3	2	422	404
4.	(United States) Air Force Falcons	5	7	2	3	394	402
5.	(Argentina) Ferro Carril Oeste	5	6	1	4	395	449
6.	(Netherlands) Elmex Leiden	5	6	1	4	381	422

1982 Intercontinental Champions

Ford Cantù
2nd title
