= 2022 FIBA Intercontinental Cup =

31st edition of the FIBA Intercontinental Cup

Tournament details
- Host country: Egypt
- City: Cairo
- Dates: 11–13 February 2022
- Teams: 4
- Venue: 1

Final positions
- Champions: (Brazil) Flamengo (2nd title)
- Runners-up: (Spain) San Pablo Burgos
- Third place: (United States) Lakeland Magic
- Fourth place: (Egypt) Zamalek

Tournament statistics
- Games played: 4
- MVP: Luke Martinez (Flamengo)
- Top scorer: Luke Martinez (Flamengo)

Official website
- Link

The 2022 FIBA Intercontinental Cup was the 31st edition of the FIBA Intercontinental Cup. The tournament was held in February 2022. The competition was played in the Hassan Moustafa Sports Hall in Cairo, the first time the competition was hosted in Egypt, as well as the first time in Africa.

Flamengo won their second Intercontinental Cup after beating San Pablo Burgos in the finals. Luke Martínez was named the tournament's MVP.

== Teams ==
Location of teams of the 2022 FIBA Intercontinental Cup

In September 2021, the Egyptian Basketball Federation announced that Zamalek, defending BAL champions, will play in the FIBA Intercontinental Cup. This will be the first time an African team will play in the competition. On 19 November 2021, FIBA officially announced the four competing teams.

Team	Qualification	Qualified date	Participations (bold indicates winners)
(Egypt) Zamalek	Hosts and Winners of the 2021 BAL season	30 May 2021	Debut
(Spain) San Pablo Burgos	Winners of the 2020–21 Basketball Champions League	9 May 2021	1 (**2020**)
(Brazil) Flamengo	Winners of the 2020–21 BCL Americas	13 April 2021	2 (**2014**, 2019)
(United States) Lakeland Magic	Winners of the 2020–21 NBA G League season	11 May 2021	Debut

== Draw ==
The draw was held on 15 January in Cairo.

== Results ==
=== Bracket ===
Semifinals
11 February
(Egypt) Zamalek	61
**(Spain) San Pablo Burgos**	**78**
11 February
**(Brazil) Flamengo**	**94**
(United States) Lakeland Magic	71

Final
13 February
(Spain) San Pablo Burgos	62
**(Brazil) Flamengo**	**75**
Third place
13 February
(Egypt) Zamalek	78
**(United States) Lakeland Magic**	**113**

=== Semifinals ===
11 February 2022	**Flamengo** (Brazil)	**94**–71	(United States) Lakeland Magic	Cairo
17:00 (UTC+2)	Scoring by quarter: **27**−19, **24**−16, 19−19, **24**−17
	Pts: Santos 18; Rebs: Batista 7 Asts: Balbi 9	Boxscore	Pts: Dowtin, Gravett 16; Rebs: Gravett 6 Asts: Gravett 8	Arena: Hassan Moustafa Sports Hall; Referees: Yohan Rosso (FRA), Danniel García (VEN), Manuel Mazzoni (ITA)

11 February 2022	Zamalek (Egypt)	61–**78**	(Spain) **San Pablo Burgos**	Cairo
20:00 (UTC+2)	Scoring by quarter: 16−**23**, 18−**21**, 13−**19**, 14−**15**
	Pts: McKinney 15; Rebs: Mahmoud 11; Asts: McKinney 4	Boxscore	Pts: Eddie 17; Rebs: Nnoko 10; Asts: Renfroe 6	Arena: Hassan Moustafa Sports Hall; Referees: Roberto Vázquez (PUR), Rabah Noujaim (LBN), Wojciech Liszka (POL)

=== Third place game ===
13 February 2022	Zamalek (Egypt)	78–**113**	(United States) **Lakeland Magic**	Cairo
17:00 (UTC+2)	Scoring by quarter: 21−**30**, 22−**33**, 14−**20**, 21−**30**
	Pts: Sosa 18; Rebs: Diogu 15; Asts: Mahmoud 5	Boxscore	Pts: Gravett 22; Rebs: Teske 7 Asts: Dowtin 11	Arena: Hassan Moustafa Sports Hall; Referees: Yohan Rosso (FRA), Danniel García (VEN), Yevgeniy Mikheyev (KAZ)

=== Final ===
13 February 2022	San Pablo Burgos (Spain)	62–**75**	(Brazil) **Flamengo**	Cairo
20:00 (UTC+2)	Scoring by quarter: 12−**25**, 17−**20**, 20−20, **13**−10
	Pts: Benite 14; Rebs: Eddie, Nnoko 6 Asts: Gamble 3	Boxscore	Pts: Olivinha 17; Rebs: Tucker 6 Asts: Santos 5	Arena: Hassan Moustafa Sports Hall; Attendance: 2,000; Referees: Roberto Vázquez (PUR), Manuel Mazzoni (ITA), Wojciech Liszka (POL)
