= 1974 FIBA Intercontinental Cup =

- League: FIBA Intercontinental Cup
- Sport: Basketball
- Finals champions: (United States) Maryland Terrapins
- Runners-up: (Italy) Ignis Varèse

FIBA Intercontinental Cup seasons
- ← 1973 FIBA Intercontinental Cup 1975 FIBA Intercontinental Cup →

The 1974 FIBA Intercontinental Cup William Jones was the 8th edition of the FIBA Intercontinental Cup for men's basketball clubs. It took place at Mexico City, Mexico.

== Participants ==
Continent	Teams	Clubs		
North America	3	(United States) Maryland Terrapins	(Mexico) Panteras de Aguascalientes	(Mexico) Dorados de Chihuahua
Europe	2	(Spain) Real Madrid	(Italy) Ignis Varèse	
South America	1	(Brazil) Vila Nova		

== League stage ==
Day 1, September 10, 1974

Team 1	Score	Team 2
Panteras de Aguascalientes (Mexico)	78–73	(Mexico) Dorados de Chihuahua
Maryland Terrapins (United States)	99–87	(Spain) Real Madrid
Ignis Varèse (Italy)	67–63	(Brazil) Vila Nova

Day 2, September 11, 1974

Team 1	Score	Team 2
Ignis Varèse (Italy)	79–78	(Mexico) Panteras de Aguascalientes
Maryland Terrapins (United States)	89–79	(Mexico) Dorados de Chihuahua
Vila Nova (Brazil)	72–71	(Spain) Real Madrid

Day 3, September 12, 1974

Team 1	Score	Team 2
Maryland Terrapins (United States)	120–107	(Mexico) Panteras de Aguascalientes
Vila Nova (Brazil)	87–81	(Mexico) Dorados de Chihuahua
Ignis Varèse (Italy)	89–76	(Spain) Real Madrid

Day 4, September 13, 1974

Team 1	Score	Team 2
Maryland Terrapins (United States)	84–76	(Brazil) Vila Nova
Ignis Varèse (Italy)	77–59	(Mexico) Dorados de Chihuahua
Real Madrid (Spain)	92–85	(Mexico) Panteras de Aguascalientes

Day 5, September 14, 1974

Team 1	Score	Team 2
Vila Nova (Brazil)	82–54	(Mexico) Panteras de Aguascalientes
Real Madrid (Spain)	97–71	(Mexico) Dorados de Chihuahua
Maryland Terrapins (United States)	81–80	(Italy) Ignis Varèse

== Final standings ==
	Team	Pld	Pts	W	L	PF	PA
1.	(United States) Maryland Terrapins	5	10	5	0	473	429
2.	(Italy) Ignis Varèse	5	8	4	1	392	357
3.	(Brazil) Vila Nova	5	6	3	2	380	357
4.	(Spain) Real Madrid	5	4	2	3	423	416
5.	(Mexico) Panteras de Aguascalientes	5	2	1	4	402	446
6.	(Mexico) Dorados de Chihuahua	5	0	0	5	363	428

1974 FIBA Intercontinental Cup Champions

Maryland Terrapins
1st title
