= 2017 FIBA Intercontinental Cup =

27th edition of the FIBA Intercontinental Cup

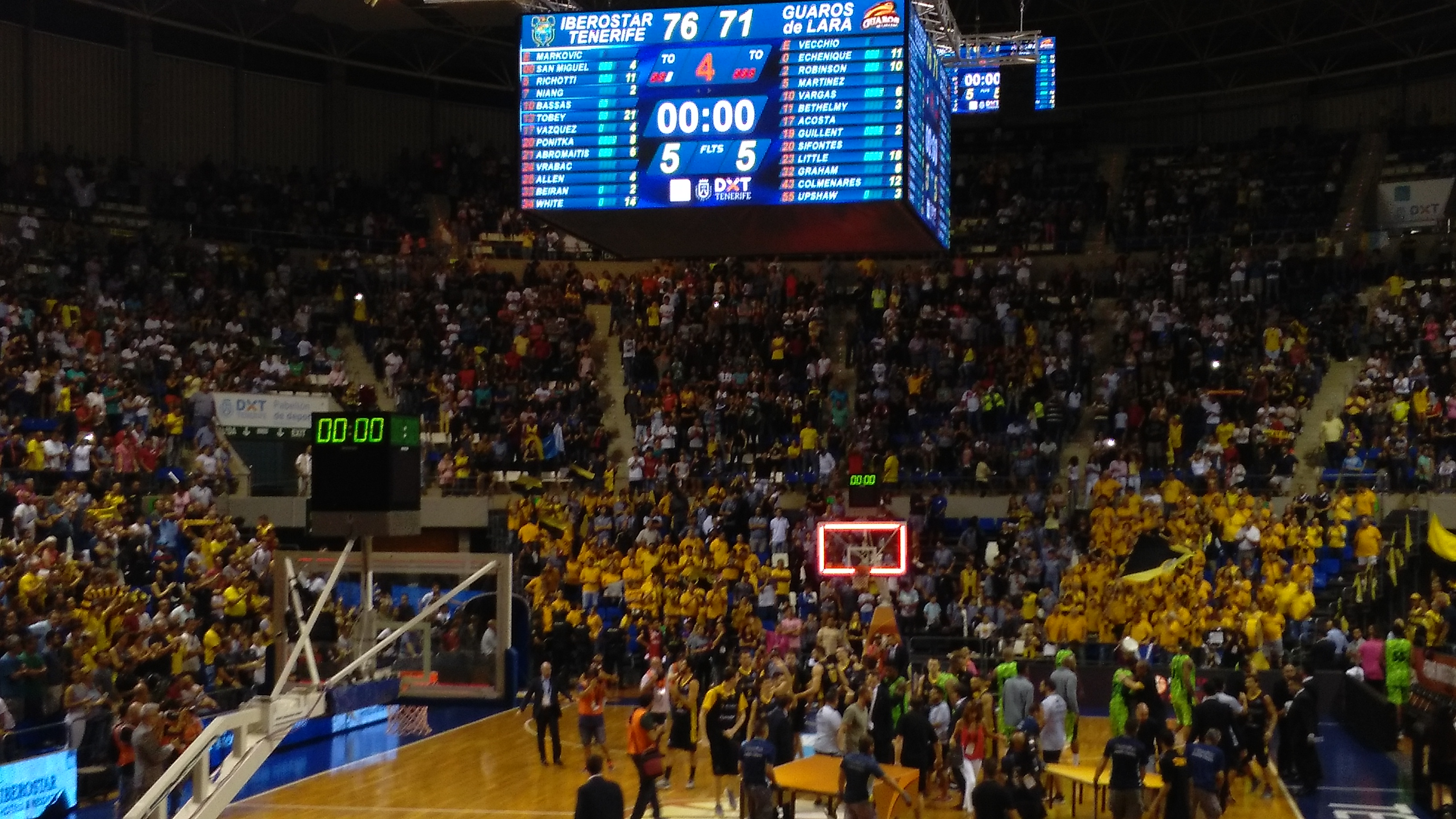
- Scenes of Tenerife celebrating after the game
- Event: FIBA Intercontinental Cup
Iberostar Tenerife	Guaros de Lara
(Spain)	(Venezuela)
76	71
- Date: 24 September 2017
- Venue: Santiago Martín, San Cristóbal de La Laguna, Tenerife, Spain
- MVP: Mike Tobey (Tenerife)

The 2017 FIBA Intercontinental Cup was the 27th edition of the FIBA Intercontinental Cup. The cup winner was decided through one game, which was held on September 24, 2017. It was contested by the 2017 FIBA Americas League champions, Guaros de Lara, and the 2017 FIBA Champions League champions, Iberostar Tenerife. The title game was held at the Santiago Martín, in San Cristóbal de La Laguna. Champions of the 2016-17 EuroLeague, Fenerbahçe, were not allowed to participate by FIBA, due to the EuroLeague's dispute with FIBA.

Iberostar Tenerife won the game, and captured its first FIBA Intercontinental Cup title. Mike Tobey was named the FIBA Intercontinental Cup Most Valuable Player.

== Qualified teams ==
Team	Qualification	Qualified date	Participations (bold indicates winners)
(Spain) Iberostar Tenerife	Winners of the 2016–17 Basketball Champions League	30 April 2017	Debut
(Venezuela) Guaros de Lara	Winners of 2017 FIBA Americas League	18 March 2017	1 (**2016**)

== Venue ==
2017 FIBA Intercontinental Cup (Spain, Canary Islands)
San Cristóbal de La Laguna
Santiago Martín
Capacity: 5,100

== Match details ==
24 September 2017	**Iberostar Tenerife (Spain)**	**76**–71	(Venezuela) Guaros de Lara	San Cristóbal de La Laguna, Tenerife, Spain
20:00	Scoring by quarter: 14–17, 22–22, 20–16, 20–16
	Pts: Tobey 21; Rebs: Tobey 9 Asts: Abromaitis 3 PIR: Tobey 24	Boxscore	Pts: Little 23; Rebs: Colmenares 11; Asts: Robinson 6 PIR: Little 23	Arena: Santiago Martín; Attendance: 5,100; Referees: Cristiano Maranho (BRA), Manuel Mazzoni (ITA), Omar Bermúdez (MEX)

Starters:			Pts	Reb	Ast
PG	00	(Spain) Rodrigo San Miguel	4	3	1
SG	5	(Argentina) Nicolás Richotti	11	3	1
G/F	20	(Poland) Mateusz Ponitka	8	1	1
PF	21	(United States) Tim Abromaitis	6	4	3
C	13	(United States) Mike Tobey	21	9	1
Reserves:					
C	7	(Senegal) Mamadou Niang	2	2	0
PG	10	(Spain) Ferrán Bassas	0	1	2
C	17	(Spain) Fran Vázquez	4	8	0
SF	24	(Bosnia and Herzegovina) Adin Vrabac	DNP		
SF	25	(Hungary) Rosco Allen	4	2	0
SF	33	(Spain) Javier Beirán	2	2	2
PG	34	(United States) Davin White	14	3	1
Head coach:
(Basketball Federation of Bosnia and Herzegovina) Nenad Marković

**Tenerife**	**Guaros de Lara**

2017 Intercontinental Cup champions

**Iberostar Tenerife**
(1st title)

Starters:			Pts	Reb	Ast
PG	2	(United States) Nate Robinson	12	1	6
G/F	23	(United States) Mario Little	23	4	1
G/F	10	(Venezuela) José Gregorio Vargas	6	7	1
F/C	43	(Venezuela) Néstor Colmenares	2	5	2
C	0	(Venezuela) Gregory Echenique	11	4	0
Reserves:					
C	55	(United States) Robert Upshaw	10	11	3
F	5	(Venezuela) José Martínez Suárez	DNP		
F	11	(Venezuela) Luis Bethelmy	3	0	1
G	17	(Venezuela) Amos Acosta La Guerre	DNP		
PG	19	(Venezuela) Heissler Guillént	2	0	2
G/F	32	(United States) Zach Graham	3	3	0
G	20	(Venezuela) Yohanner Sifontes	DNP		
Head coach:
(Spanish Basketball Federation) Iván Déniz

== MVP ==
- (United States) Mike Tobey - ( (Spain) Iberostar Tenerife)
