= 2024 FIBA Intercontinental Cup =

34th edition of the FIBA Intercontinental Cup in 2024

Tournament details
- Host country: Singapore
- City: Singapore
- Dates: 12–15 September
- Teams: 6
- Venue: 1

Final positions
- Champions: (Spanish Basketball Federation) Unicaja (1st title)
- Runners-up: (USA Basketball) NBA G League United
- Third place: (Basketball Australia) Tasmania JackJumpers
- Fourth place: (Lebanese Basketball Federation) Al Riyadi

Tournament statistics
- Games played: 9
- MVP: Dylan Osetkowski (Unicaja)
- Top scorer: Elmedin Kikanović (Al Riyadi, 16.7 ppg)

Official website
- 2024 FIBA Intercontinental Cup

The 2024 FIBA Intercontinental Cup was the 34th edition of the FIBA Intercontinental Cup. The tournament was hosted at the Singapore Indoor Stadium for a second consecutive year under a three-year agreement with the Singaporean government. It was the second time the tournament was hosted in Asia. For the first time in competition history, a team from Oceania is included and five continents represented.

Franca were the defending champions but will not be able to defend their title as they were eliminated in the quarterfinals of the 2023–24 BCL Americas season.

During the tournament, the FIBA Hall of Fame held its induction ceremony.

In the final, Unicaja defeated NBA G League United by a score of 75–60, to win their first championship.

== Teams ==
Location of teams of the 2024 FIBA Intercontinental Cup

Quimsa from Argentina was the first team to qualify for the Intercontinental Cup on 14 April. Unicaja from Spain, made its debut. Petro de Luanda from Angola qualified as the champions of the Basketball Africa League (BAL), becoming the first Sub-Saharan African team to do so. Al Riyadi qualified as the champions of the Basketball Champions League Asia, as the first team to qualify through the competition. The NBA G League will send a team of selected players, named "NBA G League United", as the previous representing team, the NBA G League Ignite, was dissolved earlier in the year. The Tasmania JackJumpers, as winners of the NBL, became the first team ever from Oceania to be included in the competition, excluding the St. Kilda Saints who played 43 years earlier in the 1981 Club World Cup.

Team	Qualification	Date of qualification	Participations (bold indicates winners)	Ref.
(Argentine Basketball Confederation) Quimsa	Winners of the 2023–24 Basketball Champions League Americas	14 April 2024	1 (2021)	
(Spanish Basketball Federation) Unicaja	Winners of the 2023–24 Basketball Champions League	28 April 2024	Debut	
(Angolan Basketball Federation) Petro de Luanda	Winners of the 2024 BAL season	1 June 2024	Debut	
(Lebanese Basketball Federation) Al Riyadi	Winners of the 2024 Basketball Champions League Asia	15 June 2024	Debut	
(USA Basketball) NBA G League United	Representative of the NBA G League	18 June 2024 (Note: Initially, the NBA G League Ignite, who also played in the previous season, were confirmed by FIBA on 13 June 2024. However, as the Ignite was dissolved, it was later announced that the league will send a team of selected players for the occasion.)	Debut	
(Basketball Australia) Tasmania JackJumpers	Winners of the 2023–24 NBL season	31 March 2024	Debut	

== Group stage ==
All times are local (UTC+08:00)

=== Group A ===
Pos	Team	Pld	W	L	PF	PA	PD	Pts	Qualification
1	(Spanish Basketball Federation) Unicaja	2	2	0	190	137	+53	4	Advance to final
2	(Lebanese Basketball Federation) Al Riyadi	2	1	1	139	171	−32	3	Qualification to third place game
3	(Angolan Basketball Federation) Petro de Luanda	2	0	2	153	174	−21	2	Qualification to fifth place game

Source: FIBA

12 September
20:00

Boxscore

Petro de Luanda (Angolan Basketball Federation)	78–94	(Spanish Basketball Federation) Unicaja
Scoring by quarter: 6–25, 26–30, 20–20, 26–19
Pts: Castro 13; Rebs: Castro 9 Asts: Diabate, Domingos 6		Pts: Kalinoski 16; Rebs: Osetkowski 8 Asts: Osetkowski 7

Singapore Indoor Stadium
Attendance: 1,627
Referees: Johnny Batista (PUR), Carlos Peralta (ECU), James Alexander Boyer (AUS)

13 September
20:00

Boxscore

Al Riyadi (Lebanese Basketball Federation)	59–96	(Spanish Basketball Federation) Unicaja
Scoring by quarter: 18–23, 13–19, 10–28, 18–26
Pts: Kikanović 19; Rebs: Kikanović 8 Asts: Gyokchyan 5		Pts: Perry 17; Rebs: Perez 7 Asts: Díaz 6

Singapore Indoor Stadium
Attendance: 3,752
Referees: Julio Anaya (PAN), Wojciech Liszka (POL), Sun Jian (CHN)

14 September
16:00

Boxscore

Petro de Luanda (Angolan Basketball Federation)	75–80	(Lebanese Basketball Federation) Al Riyadi
Scoring by quarter: 21–23, 14–11, 16–28, 24–18
Pts: Gakou 20; Rebs: Diabate 8 Asts: Diabate 7		Pts: Harris 22; Rebs: Gyokchyan 10; Asts: Gyokchyan 6

Singapore Indoor Stadium
Attendance: 2,925
Referees: Johnny Batista (PUR), Yann Vezo Davidson (MAD), James Alexander Boyer (AUS)

=== Group B ===
Pos	Team	Pld	W	L	PF	PA	PD	Pts	Qualification
1	(USA Basketball) NBA G League United	2	2	0	154	139	+15	4	Advance to final
2	(Basketball Australia) Tasmania JackJumpers	2	1	1	155	135	+20	3	Qualification to third place game
3	(Argentine Basketball Confederation) Quimsa	2	0	2	124	159	−35	2	Qualification to fifth place game

Source: FIBA

12 September
17:00

Boxscore

NBA G League United (USA Basketball)	78–65	(Argentine Basketball Confederation) Quimsa
Scoring by quarter: 16–12, 17–15, 24–22, 21–16
Pts: Burton 17; Rebs: Baker 10; Asts: Toscano 6		Pts: Romano 12; Rebs: Miller 16; Asts: four players 3

Singapore Indoor Stadium
Attendance: 1,053
Referees: Julio Anaya (PAN), Wojciech Liszka (POL), Yann Vezo Davidsaon (MAD)

13 September
17:00

Boxscore

Tasmania JackJumpers (Basketball Australia)	81–59	(Argentine Basketball Confederation) Quimsa
Scoring by quarter: 20–12, 14–12, 22–22, 25–13
Pts: Crawford 15; Rebs: Magnay 9 Asts: Krslovic 4		Pts: Brussino, Tabarez 11; Rebs: Miller 11; Asts: Sansimoni, Romano 3

Singapore Indoor Stadium
Attendance: 3,247
Referees: Johnny Batista (PUR), Boris Krejic (SLO), Ariadna Chueca (ESP)

14 September
13:00

Boxscore

NBA G League United (USA Basketball)	76–74	(Basketball Australia) Tasmania JackJumpers
Scoring by quarter: 20–11, 24–24, 18–23, 14–16
Pts: Brown 23; Rebs: three players 6 Asts: Burton 5		Pts: Crawford 24; Rebs: Te Rangi 10; Asts: Magnay 5

Singapore Indoor Stadium
Attendance: 4,136
Referees: Julio Anaya (PAN), Carlos Peralta (ECU), Boris Krejic (SLO)

== Final round ==
=== Fifth place game ===
15 September
13:00

Boxscore

Petro de Luanda (Angolan Basketball Federation)	70–64	(Argentine Basketball Confederation) Quimsa
Scoring by quarter: 11–24, 24–9, 16–22, 19–9
Pts: Gakou 20; Rebs: Gardner 10; Asts: Diabate 6		Pts: Romano 13; Rebs: Miller, Brussino 6 Asts: Brussino 8

Singapore Indoor Stadium
Attendance: 3,173
Referees: Johnny Batista (PUR), Ariadna Chueca (ESP), Yann Vezo Davidson (MAD)

=== Third place game ===
15 September
16:00

Boxscore

Al Riyadi (Lebanese Basketball Federation)	75–80	(Basketball Australia) Tasmania JackJumpers
Scoring by quarter: 20–24, 12–15, 26–12, 17–29
Pts: Gyokchyan 19; Rebs: Gyokchyan, Harris 8 Asts: Gyokchyan, Arakji 6		Pts: Magnay 19; Rebs: Magnay 7 Asts: Doyle 6

Singapore Indoor Stadium
Attendance: 3,881
Referees: Boris Krejic (SLO), Carlos Peralta (ECU), Sun Jian (CHN)

=== Final ===
15 September
19:00

Boxscore

Unicaja (Spanish Basketball Federation)	75–60	(USA Basketball) NBA G League United
Scoring by quarter: 22–17, 16–15, 19–12, 18–16
Pts: Osetkowski 15; Rebs: Kravish 7 Asts: Perry 8		Pts: Bowden 20; Rebs: Brown 6 Asts: three players 3

Singapore Indoor Stadium
Attendance: 8,205
Referees: Julio Anaya (PAN), Wojciech Liszka (POL), James Alexander Boyer (AUS)

== Final standings ==
Rank	Team	Record
1st place, gold medalist(s)	(Spanish Basketball Federation) Unicaja	3–0
2nd place, silver medalist(s)	(USA Basketball) NBA G League United	2–1
3rd place, bronze medalist(s)	(Basketball Australia) Tasmania JackJumpers	2–1
4	(Lebanese Basketball Federation) Al Riyadi	1–2
5	(Angolan Basketball Federation) Petro de Luanda	1–2
6	(Argentine Basketball Confederation) Quimsa	0–3
