= Clube Atlético Monte Líbano (basketball) =

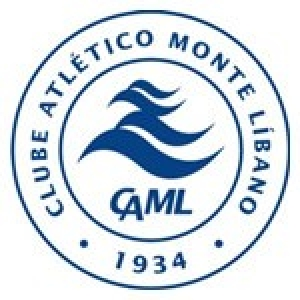
- Arena: Ginásio do Ibirapuera
- Capacity: 10,200
- Location: São Paulo, Brazil
- Team colors: White, blue
- Championships: 2 South American Club Championships; 5 Brazilian Championships
- Website: caml.com.br
Home	Away

Clube Atlético Monte Líbano, abbreviated as C.A. Monte Líbano and CAML, is a Brazilian men's professional basketball club that is based in São Paulo, Brazil.

== History ==
C.A. Monte Líbano won the regional São Paulo State Championship three times, and the national Brazilian Championship title 5 times. They also won the South American Club Championship twice.

== Honors and titles ==
=== Worldwide ===
- FIBA Intercontinental Cup
  - Runners-up (1): 1985

=== Continental ===
- South American Club Championship
  - Champions (2): 1985, 1986
  - Runners-up (2): 1983, 1987

=== National ===
- Brazilian Championship
  - Champions (5): 1982, 1985, 1986 (I), 1986 (II), 1987

=== Regional ===
- São Paulo State Championship
  - Champions (3): 1982, 1984, 1986
  - Runners-up (3): 1981, 1985, 1987

== Notable players ==
Note: Flags indicate national team eligibility at FIBA-sanctioned events. Players may hold other non-FIBA nationalities not displayed.

Criteria

To appear in this section a player must have either:

- Set a club record or won an individual award while at the club
- Played at least one official international match for their national team at any time
- Played at least one official NBA match at any time.

- (Brazil) Eduardo Agra
- (Brazil) Israel Andrade
- (Brazil) Marcel de Souza
- (Brazil) Maury de Souza
- (Brazil) Rolando Ferreira
- (Brazil) Jorge Guerra
- (Brazil) Ricardo Guimarães
- (Brazil) André Stoffel
- (Brazil) João Vianna
- (Brazil) Gerson Victalino
- (Brazil) Paulinho Villas Boas
- (Uruguay) Fefo Ruiz
- (United States) Rocky Smith
- (United States) Ray Townsend

== Head coaches ==
- (Brazil) Amaury Pasos
- (Brazil) Edvar Simões
