= 1978 FIBA Intercontinental Cup =

- League: FIBA Intercontinental Cup
- Sport: Basketball
- Finals champions: (Spain) Real Madrid
- Runners-up: (Argentina) Obras Sanitarias

FIBA Intercontinental Cup seasons
- ← 1977 FIBA Intercontinental Cup 1979 FIBA Intercontinental Cup →

The 1978 FIBA Intercontinental Cup William Jones was the 12th edition of the FIBA Intercontinental Cup for men's basketball clubs. It took place at Buenos Aires. From the FIBA European Champions Cup participated Mobilgirgi Varèse and Real Madrid, from the South American Club Championship participated EC Sírio and Obras Sanitarias, and from the Division I (NCAA) participated the Rhode Island Rams.

== Participants ==
| Continent | Teams | Clubs | |
|---|---|---|---|
| Europe | 2 | (Spain) Real Madrid | (Italy) Mobilgirgi Varèse |
| South America | 2 | (Brazil) Sírio | (Argentina) Obras Sanitarias |
| North America | 1 | (United States) Rhode Island Rams | |

== League stage ==
Day 1, June 19, 1978

| Team 1 | Score | Team 2 |
|---|---|---|
| Real Madrid (Spain) | 111–108 | (Brazil) Sírio |
| Obras Sanitarias (Argentina) | 98–71 | (United States) Rhode Island Rams |

Day 2, June 20, 1978

| Team 1 | Score | Team 2 |
|---|---|---|
| Mobilgirgi Varèse (Italy) | 90–82 | (United States) Rhode Island Rams |
| Obras Sanitarias (Argentina) | 95–90 | (Brazil) Sírio |

Day 3, June 22, 1978

| Team 1 | Score | Team 2 |
|---|---|---|
| Obras Sanitarias (Argentina) | 95–89 | (Italy) Mobilgirgi Varèse |
| Real Madrid (Spain) | 127–102 | (United States) Rhode Island Rams |

Day 4, June 23, 1978

| Team 1 | Score | Team 2 |
|---|---|---|
| Sírio (Brazil) | 109–95 | (United States) Rhode Island Rams |
| Real Madrid (Spain) | 137–112 | (Italy) Mobilgirgi Varèse |

Day 5, June 24, 1978

| Team 1 | Score | Team 2 |
|---|---|---|
| Sírio (Brazil) | 112–92 | (Italy) Mobilgirgi Varèse |
| Obras Sanitarias (Argentina) | 103–104 | (Spain) Real Madrid |

== Final standings ==
| | Team | Pld | Pts | W | L | PF | PA |
|---|---|---|---|---|---|---|---|
| 1. | (Spain) Real Madrid | 4 | 8 | 4 | 0 | 479 | 425 |
| 2. | (Argentina) Obras Sanitarias | 4 | 7 | 3 | 1 | 391 | 354 |
| 3. | (Brazil) Sírio | 4 | 6 | 2 | 2 | 419 | 393 |
| 4. | (Italy) Mobilgirgi Varèse | 4 | 5 | 1 | 3 | 383 | 426 |
| 5. | (United States) Rhode Island Rams | 4 | 4 | 0 | 4 | 350 | 424 |

1978 Intercontinental Champions

Real Madrid
3rd title
