= Pallacanestro Varese in international competitions =

History and Statistics in FIBA Europe and Euroleague Basketball

Pallacanestro Varese history and statistics in FIBA Europe and Euroleague Basketball (company) competitions.

== European competitions ==
Record	Round	Opponent club			
1961–62 FIBA European Champions Cup 1st–tier
3–1	1st round	(Portugal) Benfica	73–49 (a)	101–48 (h)	
3–1	2nd round	(Spain) Real Madrid	82–80 (h)	62–83 (a)	
1964–65 FIBA European Champions Cup 1st–tier
4–4	1st round	(Morocco) FAR	99–76 (a)	112–58 (h)	
4–4	2nd round	(Hungary) Honvéd	74–84 (a)	67–56 (h)	
4–4	QF	(Czechoslovakia) Spartak ZJŠ Brno	90–84 (h)	67–72 (a)	
4–4	SF	(Soviet Union) CSKA Moscow	57–58 (h)	67–69 (a)	
1966–67 FIBA European Cup Winner's Cup 2nd–tier
7–1	1st round	Bye	Ignis qualified without games		
7–1	2nd round	(France) Nantes	81–43 (h)	69–68 (a)	
7–1	QF	(Socialist Federal Republic of Yugoslavia) Partizan	83–55 (h)	76–73 (a)	
7–1	SF	(Czechoslovakia) Spartak ZJŠ Brno	84–83 (a)	58–53 (h)	
7–1	F	(Israel) Maccabi Tel Aviv	77–67, April 7, Palazzetto dello Sport Lino Oldrini, Varese; 67–68, April 13, Yad Eliyahu Arena, Tel Aviv		
1967–68 FIBA European Cup Winner's Cup 2nd–tier
2–2	2nd round	Bye	Ignis qualified without games		
2–2	QF	(France) ASVEL	73–88 (a)	70–51 (h)	
2–2	SF	(Greece) AEK	78–60 (h)	52–72 (a)	
1969–70 FIBA European Champions Cup 1st–tier
10–1	2nd round	(Finland) Tapion Honka	88–59 (a)	99–55 (h)	
10–1	QF	(France) ASVEL	76–69 (a)	96–70 (h)	
10–1	QF	(Soviet Union) CSKA Moscow	60–83 (a)	79–59 (h)	
10–1	QF	(Socialist Federal Republic of Yugoslavia) Crvena zvezda	99–65 (h)	75–74 (a)	
10–1	SF	(Spain) Real Madrid	90–86 (a)	103–78 (h)	
10–1	F	(Soviet Union) CSKA Moscow	79–74; April 9, Sportska Dvorana Skenderija, Sarajevo		
1970–71 FIBA European Champions Cup 1st–tier
8–3	2nd round	(West Germany) 04 Leverkusen	90–50 (h)	72–69 (a)	
8–3	QF	(Czechoslovakia) Slavia VŠ Praha	89–72 (a)	94–78 (h)	
8–3	QF	(France) Olympique Antibes	81–70 (a)	95–65 (h)	
8–3	QF	(Socialist Federal Republic of Yugoslavia) AŠK Olimpija	85–68 (h)	71–73 (a)	
8–3	SF	(Spain) Real Madrid	82–59 (h)	66–74 (a)	
8–3	F	(Soviet Union) CSKA Moscow	53–67; April 8, Arena Deurne, Antwerp		
1971–72 FIBA European Champions Cup 1st–tier
7–2	2nd round	Bye	Ignis qualified without games		
7–2	QF	(Spain) Real Madrid	90–76 (h)	71–76 (a)	
7–2	QF	(Austria) Radio Koch Wien	93–71 (a)	101–85 (h)	
7–2	QF	(Netherlands) Levi's Flamingo's	93–91 (a)	105–89 (h)	
7–2	SF	(Greece) Panathinaikos	69–55 (h)	70–78 (a)	
7–2	F	(Socialist Federal Republic of Yugoslavia) Jugoplastika	70–69; March 23, Sports Palace at Yad Eliyahu, Tel Aviv		
1972–73 FIBA European Champions Cup 1st–tier
6–3	2nd round	Bye	Ignis qualified without games		
6–3	QF	(Czechoslovakia) Slavia VŠ Praha	102–80 (h)	82–91 (a)	
6–3	QF	(Romania) Dinamo București	84–60 (h)	81–82 (a)	
6–3	QF	(Soviet Union) CSKA Moscow	76–97 (a)	78–65 (h)	
6–3	SF	(Italy) Simmenthal Milano	97–72 (a)	115–100 (h)	
6–3	F	(Soviet Union) CSKA Moscow	71–66; March 22, Country Hall du Sart Tilman, Liège		
1973–74 FIBA European Champions Cup 1st–tier
6–3	2nd round	Bye	Ignis qualified without games		
6–3	QF	(Israel) Maccabi Tel Aviv	83–77 (a)	93–76 (h)	
6–3	QF	(Belgium) Racing Ford Antwerpen	100–80 (a)	89–63 (h)	
6–3	QF	(France) Berck	89–70 (h)	84–87 (a)	
6–3	SF	(Socialist Federal Republic of Yugoslavia) Radnički Belgrade	105–78 (h)	70–83 (a)	
6–3	F	(Spain) Real Madrid	82–84; April 3, Palais des Sports de Beaulieu, Nantes		
1974–75 FIBA European Champions Cup 1st–tier
13–0	2nd round	Bye	Ignis qualified without games		
13–0	Top 12	(Austria) Sefra Wien	109–66 (h)	97–82 (a)	
13–0	Top 12	(Bulgaria) Balkan Botevgrad	84–79 (a)	106–56 (h)	
13–0	Top 12	(Socialist Federal Republic of Yugoslavia) Zadar	91–85 (h)	94–91 (a)	
13–0	Top 12	(Czechoslovakia) Slavia VŠ Praha	110–78 (h)	92–81 (a)	
13–0	Top 12	(Belgium) Racing Maes Pils Mechelen	99–87 (a)	108–84 (h)	
13–0	SF	(France) Berck	86–85 (a)	98–79 (h)	
13–0	F	(Spain) Real Madrid	79–66; April 10, Arena Deurne, Antwerp		
1975–76 FIBA European Champions Cup 1st–tier
9–4	2nd round	Bye	Mobilgirgi qualified without games		
9–4	Top 12	(Bulgaria) Academic	109–58 (h)	84–85 (a)	
9–4	Top 12	(France) ASVEL	75–81 (a)	88–67 (h)	
9–4	Top 12	(Belgium) Racing Maes Pils Mechelen	74–58 (h)	62–71 (a)	
9–4	Top 12	(Finland) Turun NMKY	103–71 (h)	99–71 (a)	
9–4	Top 12	(Socialist Federal Republic of Yugoslavia) Zadar	101–74 (h)	91–93 (a)	
9–4	SF	(Italy) Forst Cantù	95–85 (h)	78–70 (a)	
9–4	F	(Spain) Real Madrid	81–74; April 1, Patinoire des Vernets, Geneva		
1976–77 FIBA European Champions Cup 1st–tier
12–5	1st round	(Luxembourg) T71 Sanichaufer	96–64 (h)	68–62 (a)	
12–5	1st round	(Turkey) Eczacıbaşı	109–77 (h)	84–72 (a)	
12–5	1st round	(West Germany) 04 Leverkusen	86–103 (a)	96–80 (h)	
12–5	SF	(Belgium) Racing Maes Pils Mechelen	83–61 (h)	64–65 (a)	
12–5	SF	(Czechoslovakia) Spartak-Zbrojovka Brno	110–73 (h)	84–77 (a)	
12–5	SF	(Israel) Maccabi Tel Aviv	102–79 (a)	81–70 (h)	
12–5	SF	(Spain) Real Madrid	88–103 (a)	94–81 (h)	
12–5	SF	(Soviet Union) CSKA Moscow	89–75 (h)	76–104 (a)	
12–5	F	(Israel) Maccabi Tel Aviv	77–78; April 7, Hala Pionir, Belgrade		
1977–78 FIBA European Champions Cup 1st–tier
10–5	1st round	(Switzerland) Federale	101–74 (h)	118–99 (a)	
10–5	1st round	(Romania) Dinamo București	80–68 (a)	89–81 (h)	
10–5	SF	(France) ASVEL	90–77 (a)	87–79 (h)	
10–5	SF	(Israel) Maccabi Tel Aviv	91–78 (h)	80–91 (a)	
10–5	SF	(Sweden) Alvik	105–85 (h)	95–79 (a)	
10–5	SF	(Spain) Real Madrid	87–91 (a)	87–72 (h)	
10–5	SF	(Socialist Federal Republic of Yugoslavia) Jugoplastika	79–83 (h)	95–117 (a)	
10–5	F	(Spain) Real Madrid	67–75; April 6, Olympiahalle, Munich		
1978–79 FIBA European Champions Cup 1st–tier
11–4	1st round	(Portugal) Sporting	108–79 (h)	116–85 (a)	
11–4	1st round	(Luxembourg) Amicale	108–68 (a)	123–71 (h)	
11–4	SF	(Spain) Joventut Freixenet	68–70 (a)	85–78 (h)	
11–4	SF	(Greece) Olympiacos	92–67 (h)	72–68 (a)	
11–4	SF	(Israel) Maccabi Tel Aviv	71–72 (a)	71–53 (h)	
11–4	SF	(Socialist Federal Republic of Yugoslavia) Bosna	92–73 (h)	85–104 (a)	
11–4	SF	(Spain) Real Madrid	100–96 (h)	83–82 (a)	
11–4	F	(Socialist Federal Republic of Yugoslavia) Bosna	93–96; April 5, Palais des Sports, Grenoble		
11–4	1979–80 FIBA European Cup Winner's Cup 2nd–tier				
10–1	1st round	(Portugal) Sporting	Emerson qualified without games		
10–1	2nd round	(Finland) Chatby KTP	105–79 (a)	124–80 (h)	
10–1	QF	(Socialist Federal Republic of Yugoslavia) Zadar	120–92 (h)	84–67 (a)	
10–1	QF	(Turkey) Eczacıbaşı	83–69 (a)	110–72 (h)	
10–1	QF	(Spain) FC Barcelona	68–70 (a)	106–86 (h)	
10–1	SF	(Netherlands) Parker Leiden	89–87 (a)	95–87 (h)	
10–1	F	(Italy) Gabetti Cantù	90–88; March 19, Palasport di San Siro, Milan		
1980–81 FIBA European Cup Winner's Cup 2nd–tier
4–4	2nd round	Bye	Turisanda qualified without games		
4–4	QF	(Netherlands) Parker Leiden	84–85 (a)	92–74 (h)	
4–4	QF	(Turkey) Efes Pilsen	84–74 (a)	88–69 (h)	
4–4	QF	(Spain) FC Barcelona	102–88 (h)	68–76 (a)	
4–4	SF	(Italy) Squibb Cantù	84–94 (h)	65–78 (a)	
1981–82 FIBA Korać Cup 3rd–tier
2–4	2nd round	Bye	Cagiva qualified without games		
2–4	Top 16	(France) Orthez	97–82 (h)	77–102 (a)	
2–4	Top 16	(Socialist Federal Republic of Yugoslavia) Zadar	83–75 (h)	104–119 (a)	
2–4	Top 16	(Spain) Joventut Sony	65–83 (a)	73–74 (h)	
1983–84 FIBA Korać Cup 3rd–tier
2–4	2nd round	Bye	Star qualified without games		
2–4	Top 16	(France) Orthez	75–77 (h)	82–92 (a)	
2–4	Top 16	(Greece) PAOK	93–80 (h)	80–81 (a)	
2–4	Top 16	(Socialist Federal Republic of Yugoslavia) Zadar	83–97 (a)	111–100 (h)	
1984–85 FIBA Korać Cup 3rd–tier
8–3	2nd round	(Greece) Panionios	91–67 (a)	84–75 (h)	
8–3	Top 16	(Belgium) Renault Gent	102–78 (h)	105–62 (a)	
8–3	Top 16	(France) Orthez	99–75 (h)	66–82 (a)	
8–3	Top 16	(Spain) Clesa Ferrol	95–86 (a)	105–89 (h)	
8–3	SF	(Greece) Aris	77–80 (a)	95–71 (h)	
8–3	F	(Italy) Simac Milano	78–91; March 21, Palais du Midi, Brussels		
1985–86 FIBA Korać Cup 3rd–tier
5–3	2nd round	Bye	Divarese qualified without games		
5–3	Top 16	(Spain) Breogán	79–72 (a)	101–82 (h)	
5–3	Top 16	(Socialist Federal Republic of Yugoslavia) Crvena zvezda	101–83 (h)	83–90 (a)	
5–3	Top 16	(France) ASVEL	77–81 (a)	76–64 (h)	
5–3	SF	(Italy) Mobilgirgi Caserta	84–71 (h)	75–91 (a)	
1986–87 FIBA Korać Cup 3rd–tier
4–4	2nd round	(Israel) Hapoel Tel Aviv	85–92 (a)	112–75 (h)	
4–4	Top 16	(Socialist Federal Republic of Yugoslavia) Jugoplastika	76–84 (a)	105–90 (h)	
4–4	Top 16	(France) Olympique Antibes	98–76 (h)	93–95 (a)	
4–4	Top 16	(Spain) FC Barcelona	71–83 (a)	82–79 (h)	
1987–88 FIBA Korać Cup 3rd–tier
2–1 +1 draw	1st round	(Luxembourg) T71 Dudelange	115–61 (h)	114–89 (a)	
2–1 +1 draw	2nd round	(France) Racing Paris	98–98 (h)	83–96 (a)	
1988–89 FIBA Korać Cup 3rd–tier
4–4	2nd round	(Greece) Panathinaikos	76–79 (a)	91–73 (h)	
4–4	Top 16	(Socialist Federal Republic of Yugoslavia) Partizan	71–75 (a)	75–77 (h)	
4–4	Top 16	(Spain) Estudiantes Bosé	83–71 (h)	92–89 (a)	
4–4	Top 16	(Belgium) Assubel Mariembourg	80–88 (a)	103–80 (h)	
1990–91 FIBA Korać Cup 3rd–tier
5–5	1st round	(Cyprus) APOEL	87–55 (a)	87–55 (h)	
5–5	2nd round	(Belgium) Go Pass Verviers-Pepinster	84–74 (a)	103–109 (h)	
5–5	Top 16	(Spain) Montigalà Joventut	69–109 (a)	78–92 (h)	
5–5	Top 16	(France) Mulhouse	83–99 (a)	99–70 (h)	
5–5	Top 16	(Greece) Iraklis	121–95 (h)	73–98 (a)	
1995–96 FIBA Korać Cup 3rd–tier
9–3	2nd round	(Bulgaria) Slavia Sofia	104–89 (a)	97–70 (h)	
9–3	3rd round	Croatia Osiguranje	60–54 (a)	72–61 (h)	
9–3	Top 16	(Turkey) Efes Pilsen	60–80 (a)	80–56 (h)	
9–3	Top 16	(Spain) Festina Andorra	78–61 (h)	83–73 (a)	
9–3	Top 16	(Greece) Panionios Afisorama	61–68 (a)	96–91 (h)	
9–3	QF	(Italy) Stefanel Milano	72–81 (h)	90–89 (a)	
1996–97 FIBA Korać Cup 3rd–tier
4–4	1st round	Bye	Cagiva qualified without games		
4–4	2nd round	(Israel) Bnei Herzliya	87–84 (a)	79–67 (h)	
4–4	2nd round	(Bulgaria) Cherno More Port Varna	97–72 (h)	71–85 (a)	
4–4	2nd round	(Poland) Mazowzanka	83–85 (a)	88–96 (h)	
4–4	3rd round	(Greece) Nikas Peristeri	78–72 (h)	81–92 (a)	
1997–98 FIBA Korać Cup 3rd–tier
7–2 +1 draw	1st round	Bye	Varese qualified without games		
7–2 +1 draw	2nd round	(Croatia) Benston	70–60 (h)	89–90 (a)	
7–2 +1 draw	2nd round	(North Macedonia) Žito Vardar	101–71 (h)	88–68 (a)	
7–2 +1 draw	2nd round	(Turkey) Galatasaray	77–70 (a)	80–65 (h)	
7–2 +1 draw	3rd round	(Russia) Spartak Moscow	104–79 (a)	94–94 (h)	
7–2 +1 draw	Top 16	(France) Cholet	70–95 (a)	89–82 (h)	
1998–99 FIBA EuroLeague 1st–tier
7–11	1st round	(Russia) Avtodor Saratov	70–73 (a)	95–73 (h)	
7–11	1st round	(Lithuania) Žalgiris	81–97 (a)	75–84 (h)	
7–11	1st round	(Spain) Tau Cerámica	86–78 (h)	72–75 (a)	
7–11	1st round	(France) Pau-Orthez	89–77 (h)	67–82 (a)	
7–11	1st round	(Turkey) Fenerbahçe	75–94 (a)	92–78 (h)	
7–11	2nd round	(Turkey) Efes Pilsen	67–57 (h)	72–83 (a)	
7–11	2nd round	(Greece) Panathinaikos	71–82 (a)	63–54 (h)	
7–11	2nd round	(Israel) Maccabi Tel Aviv	100–96 (h)	78–94 (a)	
7–11	Top 16	(Greece) Olympiacos	66–78 (a)	77–83 (h)	– (a)
1999–00 FIBA EuroLeague 1st–tier
5–11	1st round	(Slovenia) Pivovarna Laško	83–73 (a)	80–70 (h)	
5–11	1st round	(Turkey) Ülker	82–86 (h)	70–79 (a)	
5–11	1st round	(Israel) Maccabi Tel Aviv	79–87 (h)	66–87 (a)	
5–11	1st round	(France) ASVEL	71–84 (a)	58–60 (h)	
5–11	1st round	(Greece) Olympiacos	69–62 (a)	57–74 (h)	
5–11	2nd round	(Croatia) Cibona	87–77 (h)	59–75 (a)	
5–11	2nd round	(Turkey) Efes Pilsen	74–84 (a)	76–79 (h)	
5–11	2nd round	(Italy) Paf Wennington Bologna	91–72 (h)	82–91 (a)	
2002–03 ULEB Cup 2nd–tier
7–7	Regular season	(Spain) Caprabo Lleida	87–78 (h)	78–82 (a)	
7–7	Regular season	(Croatia) Zadar	71–73 (a)	88–86 (h)	
7–7	Regular season	(Belgium) Spirou	75–69 (h)	71–79 (a)	
7–7	Regular season	(France) Cholet	81–76 (h)	74–85 (a)	
7–7	Regular season	(Netherlands) Ricoh Astronauts	79–69 (a)	80–72 (h)	
7–7	Top 16	(Italy) Snaidero Udine	77–83 (h)	73–59 (a)	
7–7	QF	(Spain) Adecco Estudiantes	59–77 (a)	88–101 (h)	
2003–04 ULEB Cup 2nd–tier
8–6	Regular season	(France) Gravelines-Dunkerque	80–63 (h)	70–71 (a)	
8–6	Regular season	(Spain) Etosa Alicante	83–80 (a)	93–78 (h)	
8–6	Regular season	(Latvia) Ventspils	75–66 (a)	85–75 (h)	
8–6	Regular season	(Serbia and Montenegro) Crvena zvezda	93–84 (h)	76–85 (a)	
8–6	Regular season	(Belgium) Spirou	89–93 (a)	100–75 (h)	
8–6	Top 16	(Germany) RheinEnergie Köln	70–81 (a)	81–62 (h)	
8–6	QF	(Spain) Real Madrid	67–68 (a)	57–62 (h)	
2004–05 ULEB Cup 2nd–tier
7–5	Regular season	(Portugal) QueluzSintra PM	98–91 (a)	91–83 (h)	
7–5	Regular season	(France) Élan Chalon	71–65 (h)	77–61 (a)	
7–5	Regular season	(Spain) Pamesa Valencia	59–84 (a)	69–83 (h)	
7–5	Regular season	(Israel) Hapoel Migdal	95–74 (h)	61–90 (a)	
7–5	Regular season	(Portugal) Ovarense Aerosoles	70–60 (a)	73–67 (h)	
7–5	Top 16	(Greece) Makedonikos	65–77 (h)	57–90 (a)	
2013–14 Euroleague 1st–tier
0–1	Qualifying round 1	(Germany) EWE Baskets	74–79; October 1, Siemens Arena, Qualification tournament, Vilnius		
2013–14 Eurocup 2nd–tier
2–8	Regular season	(Slovenia) Union Olimpija	59–67 (a)	82–83 (h)	
2–8	Regular season	(France) Paris-Levallois	77–71 (h)	65–77 (a)	
2–8	Regular season	(France) ASVEL	78–85 (h)	80–83 (a)	
2–8	Regular season	(Spain) Valencia	64–98 (a)	62–94 (h)	
2–8	Regular season	(Germany) ratiopharm Ulm	77–78 (h)	86–75 (a)	
2015–16 FIBA Europe Cup 3rd–tier
13–7	Regular season	(Belgium) Telenet Oostende	79–83 (h)	85–79 (a)	
13–7	Regular season	(Hungary) Falco Szombathely	94–71 (h)	73–75 (a)	
13–7	Regular season	(Sweden) Södertälje Kings	86–90 (a)	76–61 (h)	
13–7	Top 32	(Belarus) Tsmoki-Minsk	94–63 (h)	89–84 (a)	
13–7	Top 32	(Cyprus) AEK Larnaca	61–65 (a)	74–72 (h)	
13–7	Top 32	(Austria) Magnofit Güssing Knights	85–81 (h)	77–71 (a)	
13–7	Top 16	(Turkey) Gaziantep	82–81 (h)	60–76 (a)	74–71 (h)
13–7	QF	(Belgium) Port of Antwerp Giants	92–81 (h)	82–93 (a)	105–93 (h)
13–7	SF	(France) Élan Chalon	91–82; April 29, Le Colisée, Chalon-sur-Saône		
13–7	F	(Germany) Fraport Skyliners	62–66; May 1, Le Colisée, Chalon-sur-Saône		

== Worldwide competitions ==
Record	Round	Opponent club	
1966 FIBA Intercontinental Cup
2–0	SF	(Spain) Real Madrid	86–77; January 7, Pabellón de la Ciudad Deportiva del Real Madrid, Madrid
2–0	F	(Brazil) Corinthians	66–59; January 9, Pabellón de la Ciudad Deportiva del Real Madrid, Madrid
1967 FIBA Intercontinental Cup
1–1	SF	(Italy) Simmenthal Milano	79–70; January 6, Palazzetto dello Sport, Rome
1–1	F	(United States) Akron Goodyear Wingfoots	72–78; January 7, Palazzetto dello Sport, Rome
1970 FIBA Intercontinental Cup
4–0	Mini league	(Brazil) Corinthians	84–57; September 23, Palazzetto dello Sport Lino Oldrini, Varese
4–0	Mini league	(Spain) Real Madrid	81–60; September 24, Palazzetto dello Sport Lino Oldrini, Varese
4–0	Mini league	(Czechoslovakia) Slavia VŠ Praha	71–63; September 26, Palazzetto dello Sport Lino Oldrini, Varese
4–0	Mini league	(United States) Columbia Sertoma	53–49; September 27, Palazzetto dello Sport Lino Oldrini, Varese
1973 FIBA Intercontinental Cup
3–1	Mini league	(Puerto Rico) Vaqueros de Bayamón	94–66; May 1, Ginásio do Ibirapuera, São Paulo
3–1	Mini league	(Socialist Federal Republic of Yugoslavia) Jugoplastika	92–78; May 3, Ginásio do Ibirapuera, São Paulo
3–1	Mini league	(United States) Lexington Marathon Oilers	104–89; May 4, Ginásio do Ibirapuera, São Paulo
3–1	Mini league	(Brazil) Sírio	74–81; May 5, Ginásio do Ibirapuera, São Paulo
1974 FIBA Intercontinental Cup
4–1	Mini league	(Brazil) Vila Nova	67–63; September 10, Palacio de los Deportes, Mexico City
4–1	Mini league	(Mexico) Panteras de Aguascalientes	79–78; September 11, Palacio de los Deportes, Mexico City
4–1	Mini league	(Spain) Real Madrid	89–76; September 12, Palacio de los Deportes, Mexico City
4–1	Mini league	(Mexico) Dorados de Chihuahua	77–59; September 13, Palacio de los Deportes, Mexico City
4–1	Mini league	(United States) Maryland Terrapins	80–81; September 14, Palacio de los Deportes, Mexico City
1975 FIBA Intercontinental Cup
2–3	5th Mini league	(Spain) Real Madrid	75–77; September 13, Palazzetto dello Sport Lino Oldrini, Varese
2–3	5th Mini league	(Brazil) Amazonas Franca	67–68; September 14, Palasport Pianella, Cucciago
2–3	5th Mini league	(Italy) Forst Cantù	87–83; September 15, Palazzetto dello Sport Lino Oldrini, Varese
2–3	5th Mini league	(Central African Republic) Hit Trésor	84–68; September 16, Palasport Pianella, Cucciago
2–3	5th Mini league	(United States) Penn Quakers	82–95; September 17, Palazzetto dello Sport Lino Oldrini, Varese
1976 FIBA Intercontinental Cup
4–1	Mini league	(United States) Missouri Tigers	89–66; October 1, Estadio Luna Park, Buenos Aires
4–1	Mini league	(Brazil) Amazonas Franca	68–67; October 2, Estadio Luna Park, Buenos Aires
4–1	Mini league	(Senegal) ASFA	94–46; October 3, Estadio Luna Park, Buenos Aires
4–1	Mini league	(Spain) Real Madrid	74–79; October 4, Estadio Luna Park, Buenos Aires
4–1	Mini league	(Argentina) Obras Sanitarias	81–77; October 5, Estadio Luna Park, Buenos Aires
1977 FIBA Intercontinental Cup
3–2	Mini league	(Mexico) Dragones de Tijuana	104–87; October 4, Pabellón de la Ciudad Deportiva del Real Madrid, Madrid
3–2	Mini league	(United States) Providence Friars	99–89; October 5, Pabellón de la Ciudad Deportiva del Real Madrid, Madrid
3–2	Mini league	(Israel) Maccabi Tel Aviv	108–100; October 6, Pabellón de la Ciudad Deportiva del Real Madrid, Madrid
3–2	Mini league	(Spain) Real Madrid	94–115; October 7, Pabellón de la Ciudad Deportiva del Real Madrid, Madrid
3–2	Mini league	(Brazil) Atlética Francana	87–98; October 8, Pabellón de la Ciudad Deportiva del Real Madrid, Madrid
1978 FIBA Intercontinental Cup
1–3	4th Mini league	(United States) Rhode Island Rams	90–82; June 2, Estadio Obras Sanitarias, Buenos Aires
1–3	4th Mini league	(Argentina) Obras Sanitarias	89–95; June 3, Estadio Obras Sanitarias, Buenos Aires
1–3	4th Mini league	(Spain) Real Madrid	112–137; June 4, Estadio Obras Sanitarias, Buenos Aires
1–3	4th Mini league	(Brazil) Sírio	92–112; June 5, Estadio Obras Sanitarias, Buenos Aires
1979 FIBA Intercontinental Cup
2–2	Mini league	(Puerto Rico) Piratas de Quebradillas	78–73; October 3, Ginásio do Ibirapuera, São Paulo
2–2	Mini league	(Socialist Federal Republic of Yugoslavia) Bosna	90–109; October 4, Ginásio do Ibirapuera, São Paulo
2–2	Mini league	(Brazil) Sírio	79–83; October 5, Ginásio do Ibirapuera, São Paulo
2–2	Mini league	(United States) Mo-Kan All-Stars	80–75; October 6, Ginásio do Ibirapuera, São Paulo
