= USK Praha in international competitions =

USK Praha history and statistics in FIBA Europe and Euroleague Basketball (company) competitions.

== European competitions ==
Record	Round	Opponent club			
1965–66 FIBA European Champions Cup 1st–tier
8–4	1st round	(Denmark) Gladsaxe Efterslægten	84–57 (a)	87–39 (h)	
8–4	Top 16	(Hungary) Honvéd	100–62 (a)	82–81 (h)	
8–4	QF	(Spain) Real Madrid	83–71 (h)	63–80 (a)	
8–4	QF	(Italy) Simmenthal Milano	77–96 (a)	82–59 (h)	
8–4	QF	(Belgium) Racing Mechelen	91–104 (a)	94–76 (h)	
8–4	SF	(Greece) AEK	103–73; March 30, Final4 Milan		
8–4	F	(Italy) Simmenthal Milano	72–77; April 1, Palazzo dello Sport, Final4 Bologna		
1966–67 FIBA European Champions Cup 1st–tier
7–4	Top 16	(Romania) Steaua București	72–76 (a)	70–66 (h)	77–61 (h)
7–4	QF	(East Germany) Vorwärts Leipzig	80–63 (h)	68–63 (a)	
7–4	QF	(Spain) Real Madrid	75–99 (a)	87–74 (h)	
7–4	QF	(Bulgaria) Lokomotiv Sofia	95–88 (a)	92–71 (h)	
7–4	SF	(Italy) Simmenthal Milano	97–103; March 30, Pabellón de la Ciudad Deportiva del Real Madrid, Final4 Madrid		
7–4	3rd place game	(Socialist Federal Republic of Yugoslavia) AŠK Olimpija	83–88; April 1, Pabellón de la Ciudad Deportiva del Real Madrid, Final4 Madrid		
1967–68 FIBA European Cup Winners' Cup 2nd–tier
5–2	2nd round	(West Germany) Osnabrück	88–77 (a)	90–51 (h)	
5–2	QF	(Socialist Federal Republic of Yugoslavia) AŠK Olimpija	95–64 (h)	70–82 (a)	
5–2	SF	(East Germany) Vorwärts Leipzig	58–57 (a)	98–76 (h)	
5–2	F	(Greece) AEK	82–89; April 4, Panathenaic Stadium, Athens		
1968–69 FIBA European Cup Winners' Cup 2nd–tier
7–0	2nd round	(Finland) Helsingin Kisa-Toverit	76–74 (a)	94–86 (h)	
7–0	QF	(Poland) Legia Warsaw	113–82 (h)	91–80 (a)	
7–0	SF	(Socialist Federal Republic of Yugoslavia) AŠK Olimpija	83–76 (a)	82–61 (h)	
7–0	F	(Soviet Union) Dinamo Tbilisi	80–74; April 17, Wiener Stadthalle, Vienna		
1969–70 FIBA European Champions Cup 1st–tier
5–5	2nd round	(Austria) Engelmann Wien	106–68 (h)	93–79 (a)	
5–5	QF	(Spain) Real Madrid	78–76 (h)	80–95 (a)	
5–5	QF	(Bulgaria) Academic	87–65 (h)	62–75 (a)	
5–5	QF	(Belgium) Racing Bell Mechelen	70–78 (a)	80–68 (h)	
5–5	SF	(Soviet Union) CSKA Moscow	79–107 (h)	75–113 (a)	
1970–71 FIBA European Champions Cup 1st–tier
7–5	1st round	(Denmark) Virum	113–63 (a)	146–42 (h)	
7–5	Top 16	(Turkey) İTÜ	66–77 (a)	103–77 (h)	
7–5	QF	(Italy) Ignis Varese	72–89 (h)	78–94 (a)	
7–5	QF	(Socialist Federal Republic of Yugoslavia) AŠK Olimpija	58–76 (a)	101–78 (h)	
7–5	QF	(France) Olympique Antibes	97–91 (a)	100–80 (h)	
7–5	SF	(Soviet Union) CSKA Moscow	83–68 (h)	67–94 (a)	
1971–72 FIBA European Champions Cup 1st–tier
4–2 +2 draws	2nd round	(Finland) Tapion Honka	87–80 (a)	101–73 (h)	
4–2 +2 draws	QF	(Socialist Federal Republic of Yugoslavia) Jugoplastika	78–75 (h)	81–94 (a)	
4–2 +2 draws	QF	(Belgium) Bus Fruit Lier	95–81 (h)	83–83 (a)	
4–2 +2 draws	QF	(Greece) Panathinaikos	73–99 (a)	74–74 (h)	
1972–73 FIBA European Champions Cup 1st–tier
5–5	1st round	(Portugal) Porto	93–81 (a)	109–68 (h)	
5–5	2nd round	(France) ASVEL	63–66 (a)	90–82 (h)	
5–5	QF	(Italy) Ignis Varese	80–102 (a)	91–82 (h)	
5–5	QF	(Soviet Union) CSKA Moscow	79–94 (h)	76–77 (a)	
5–5	QF	(Romania) Dinamo București	99–83 (h)	64–100 (a)	
1974–75 FIBA European Champions Cup 1st–tier
5–6 +1 draw	2nd round	(Egypt) Al-Zamalek	110–65 (h)	91–90 (a)	
5–6 +1 draw	QF	(Socialist Federal Republic of Yugoslavia) Zadar	69–93 (a)	86–85 (h)	
5–6 +1 draw	QF	(Austria) Sefra Wien	76–57 (h)	62–87 (a)	
5–6 +1 draw	QF	(Belgium) Racing Maes Pils Mechelen	85–85 (h)	80–108 (a)	
5–6 +1 draw	QF	(Italy) Ignis Varese	78–110 (a)	81–92 (h)	
5–6 +1 draw	QF	(Bulgaria) Balkan Botevgrad	75–94 (a)	79–64 (h)	
1975–76 FIBA European Cup Winners' Cup 2nd–tier
2–2	1st round	(Syria) Al-Wahda	02–00 (a)	02–00 (h)	
2–2	2nd round	(West Germany) SSV Hagen	75–84 (a)	76–78 (h)	
1976–77 FIBA European Cup Winners' Cup 2nd–tier
4–6	1st round	(Greece) AEK	66–73 (a)	106–59 (h)	
4–6	2nd round	(Belgium) Ijsboerke Kortrijk	83–96 (a)	95–69 (h)	
4–6	QF	(Italy) Cinzano Milano	97–83 (h)	63–105 (a)	
4–6	QF	(Soviet Union) Spartak Leningrad	58–84 (a)	84–79 (h)	
4–6	QF	(Socialist Federal Republic of Yugoslavia) Radnički Belgrade	70–115 (a)	54–84 (h)	
1977–78 FIBA European Cup Winners' Cup 2nd–tier
1–1	2nd round	(Netherlands) Falcon Jeans EBBC	73–98 (a)	83–78 (h)	
1978–79 FIBA Korać Cup 3rd–tier
4–4	2nd round	(West Germany) Wolfenbüttel	86–82 (h)	80–60 (a)	
4–4	Top 16	(France) Caen	75–87 (h)	54–75 (a)	
4–4	Top 16	(Belgium) Éveil Monceau	85–83 (h)	87–86 (a)	
4–4	Top 16	(Socialist Federal Republic of Yugoslavia) Jugoplastika	77–92 (a)	84–91 (h)	
1980–81 FIBA Korać Cup 3rd–tier
1–1	2nd round	(Belgium) Sunair Oostende	90–84 (h)	64–79 (a)	
1981–82 FIBA European Champions Cup 1st–tier
1–3	1st round	(Turkey) Eczacıbaşı	96–89 (a)	74–75 (h)	
1–3	1st round	(Egypt) Al-Zamalek	Al-Zamalek withdrew without games		
1–3	1st round	(Socialist Federal Republic of Yugoslavia) Partizan	97–99 (h)	80–85 (a)	
1982–83 FIBA European Champions Cup 1st–tier
1–1	1st round	(Finland) Turun NMKY	63–90 (a)	86–77 (h)	
1988–89 FIBA Korać Cup 3rd–tier
0–2	1st round	(Italy) Wiwa Vismara Cantù	79–93 (h)	91–106 (a)	
1991–92 FIBA European League 1st–tier
1–1	1st round	(Cyprus) Pezoporikos Larnaca	88–92 (a)	86–83 (h)	
1992–93 FIBA European League 1st–tier
2–2	1st round	(Romania) Universitatea Cluj-Napoca	85–59 (a)	103–87 (h)	
2–2	2nd round	(Spain) Estudiantes Caja Postal	84–99 (h)	68–76 (a)	
1992–93 FIBA European Cup 2nd–tier
0–2	3rd round	(Russia) CSKA Moscow	96–113 (h)	89–108 (a)	
1993–94 FIBA European League 1st–tier
2–2	1st round	(Luxembourg) Résidence	94–67 (a)	86–63 (h)	
2–2	2nd round	(Italy) Benetton Treviso	75–88 (h)	73–97 (a)	
1993–94 FIBA European Cup 2nd–tier
0–2	3rd round	(Switzerland) Fidefinanz Bellinzona	75–78 (h)	83–88 (a)	
1994–95 FIBA Korać Cup 3rd–tier
3–2 +1 draw	1st round	(Slovenia) Helios Suns	100–77 (a)	106–75 (h)	
3–2 +1 draw	2nd round	(Israel) Bnei Herzliya	95–82 (h)	81–93 (a)	
3–2 +1 draw	3rd round	(Italy) Filodoro Bologna	69–69 (h)	80–82 (a)	
1995–96 FIBA Korać Cup 3rd–tier
0–2	1st round	(Austria) Trodat Wels	82–84 (a)	65–76 (h)	
1996–97 FIBA Korać Cup 3rd–tier
3–5	1st round	(North Macedonia) Tikveš	77–78 (a)	104–73 (h)	
3–5	2nd round	(Greece) Aris	88–90 (h)	65–77 (a)	
3–5	2nd round	(Croatia) Olimpija Slavoning	73–87 (a)	87–76 (h)	
3–5	2nd round	(Slovenia) Satex Maribor	87–82 (h)	78–81 (a)	
1997–98 FIBA EuroCup 2nd–tier
1–9	1st round	(Greece) Apollon Patras	86–108 (h)	69–99 (a)	
1–9	1st round	(Belgium) Spirou	58–94 (a)	61–71 (h)	
1–9	1st round	(Slovenia) Kovinotehna Savinjska Polzela	75–79 (h)	68–93 (a)	
1–9	1st round	(Netherlands) Libertel Dolphins EBBC	66–77 (a)	84–67 (h)	
1–9	1st round	(Croatia) Zrinjevac	95–115 (h)	68–90 (a)	

== Worldwide competitions ==
Record	Round	Opponent club	
1967 FIBA Intercontinental Cup
0–1	Qualifying round	(Italy) Simmenthal Milano	77–82; January 4, Palazzetto dello Sport Partenope, Naples
1970 FIBA Intercontinental Cup
1–3	League stage	(Brazil) Corinthians	74–82; September 24, Palazzetto dello Sport Lino Oldrini, Varese
1–3	League stage	(United States) Columbia Sertoma	81–74; September 25, Palazzetto dello Sport Lino Oldrini, Varese
1–3	League stage	(Italy) Ignis Varese	63–71; September 26, Palazzetto dello Sport Lino Oldrini, Varese
1–3	League stage	(Spain) Real Madrid	57–84; September 27, Palazzetto dello Sport Lino Oldrini, Varese

== Record ==
USK Praha has overall from 1965 to 1966 (first participation) to 1997–98 (last participation): 79 wins against 80 defeats plus 4 draws in 163 games for all the European club competitions.

- EuroLeague: 48–40 plus 3 draws (91)
  - FIBA Saporta Cup: 22–24 (44)
    - FIBA Korać Cup: 11–6 plus 1 draw (28)

Also USK has a 1–4 record in the FIBA Intercontinental Cup.

== See also ==
- Czechoslovak basketball clubs in European competitions
