= 1972 FIBA Intercontinental Cup of National Teams =

- League: FIBA Intercontinental Cup
- Sport: Basketball
- Finals champions: (United States) NABL All-Stars
- Runners-up: Soviet Union

FIBA Intercontinental Cup of National Teams seasons
- ← 1970 FIBA Intercontinental Cup 1973 FIBA Intercontinental Cup →

The 1972 FIBA Intercontinental Cup of National Teams was a special edition tournament of the FIBA Intercontinental Cup, and the 6th edition of the tournament overall. It took place at Ginásio do Ibirapuera, São Paulo, Brazil.

== Participants ==
Continent	Teams	Clubs	
Europe	2	Soviet Union	Poland
North America	1	(United States) NABL All-Stars	
South America	1	Brazil	

== League stage ==
Day 1, January 26 & 27, 1972

Team 1	Score	Team 2
Brazil	82–62	Poland
NABL All-Stars (United States)	67–77	Soviet Union

Day 2, January 28, 1972

Team 1	Score	Team 2
Poland	60–81	Soviet Union
Brazil	61–83	(United States) NABL All-Stars

Day 3, January 29, 1972

Team 1	Score	Team 2
Poland	76–80	(United States) NABL All-Stars
Brazil	65–64	Soviet Union

== Final standings ==
	Team	Pld	Pts	W	L	PF	PA
1.	(United States) NABL All-Stars	3	4	2	1	230	214
2.	Soviet Union	3	4	2	1	222	192
3.	Brazil	3	4	2	1	208	209
4.	Poland	3	0	0	3	198	243

1972 FIBA Intercontinental Cup Champions

NABL All-Stars
