= Constâncio Vaz Guimarães =

Brazilian lawyer, tax attorney, athlete and sports administrator

- Born: c. 1886; São Paulo, Brazil
- Died: c. 1968; São Paulo, Brazil
- Occupations: Athlete, sports administrator
- Known for: Contributions to Brazilian athletics

Constâncio Vaz Guimarães (c. 1886 – c. 1968) was a Brazilian lawyer, tax attorney, athlete, and sports administrator. He is recognized for his contributions to the development of athletics and sports infrastructure in São Paulo, as well as his involvement in sports programs in Brazil. Vaz Guimarães was also a decathlete and represented the Club Athletico Paulistano in São Paulo.

== Early life and career ==
Constâncio Vaz Guimarães was born around 1886 in São Paulo and held an early interest in sports. He participated as a decathlete, and worked as a lawyer and tax attorney.

On September 30, 1939, he helped create the Boqueirão Praia Beach Club.

== Contributions to sports development ==
In 1934, Vaz Guimarães became the first president of the Federação Universitária Paulista de Esportes (FUPE), an organization he co-founded while a member of the XI de Agosto Academic Center at the Faculty of Law of São Paulo. As a member of the São Paulo Athletics Federation, Vaz Guimarães worked to help advance the state’s athletic programs and infrastructure. He was also part of the Steering Committee at the 1936 Berlin Olympic Games.

== Legacy and recognition ==
The São Paulo state government posthumously honored Vaz Guimarães in 1968 by naming the Constâncio Vaz Guimarães Sports Complex after him. The complex includes facilities such as the Ibirapuera Gymnasium, which has hosted numerous national and international events.

In 2024, the complex was officially designated as a heritage site by the National Institute of Historic and Artistic Heritage (IPHAN).
