= USK Praha =

Czech basketball team

- League: NBL
- Founded: 1953; 73 years ago
- History: List: Slavia ITVS Praha (1953–1959) Slavia VŠ Praha (1959–1982) VŠ Praha (1982–1991) USK Praha (1991-1995) USK Trident Praha (1995–1996) USK Erpet Praha (1996-2001) USK Praha (2001-present)
- Arena: Hala Folimanka
- Capacity: 1,300
- Location: Prague, Czech Republic
- Team colors: Navy and white
- Head coach: David E. Gale
- Championships: 1 FIBA Saporta Cup; 11 Czechoslovak Championships; 3 Czech Championships
- Website: uskpraha.cz
Home	Away

USK Praha (Czech: Univerzitní Sportovní Klub Praha, University Sports Club Prague), formerly known as Slavia VŠ Praha (Czech: Slavia Vysoké Školy Praha), is a Czech professional basketball club that was founded in 1953 in the city of Prague. USK Praha plays in the NBL, the highest competition in the Czech Republic, where they are 14-time national champions. USK Praha also became the first, and so far the only men's basketball club in the Czech Republic as well as former Czechoslovakia, to win one of the European cup competitions, the FIBA Cup Winners' Cup in 1969.

== History ==
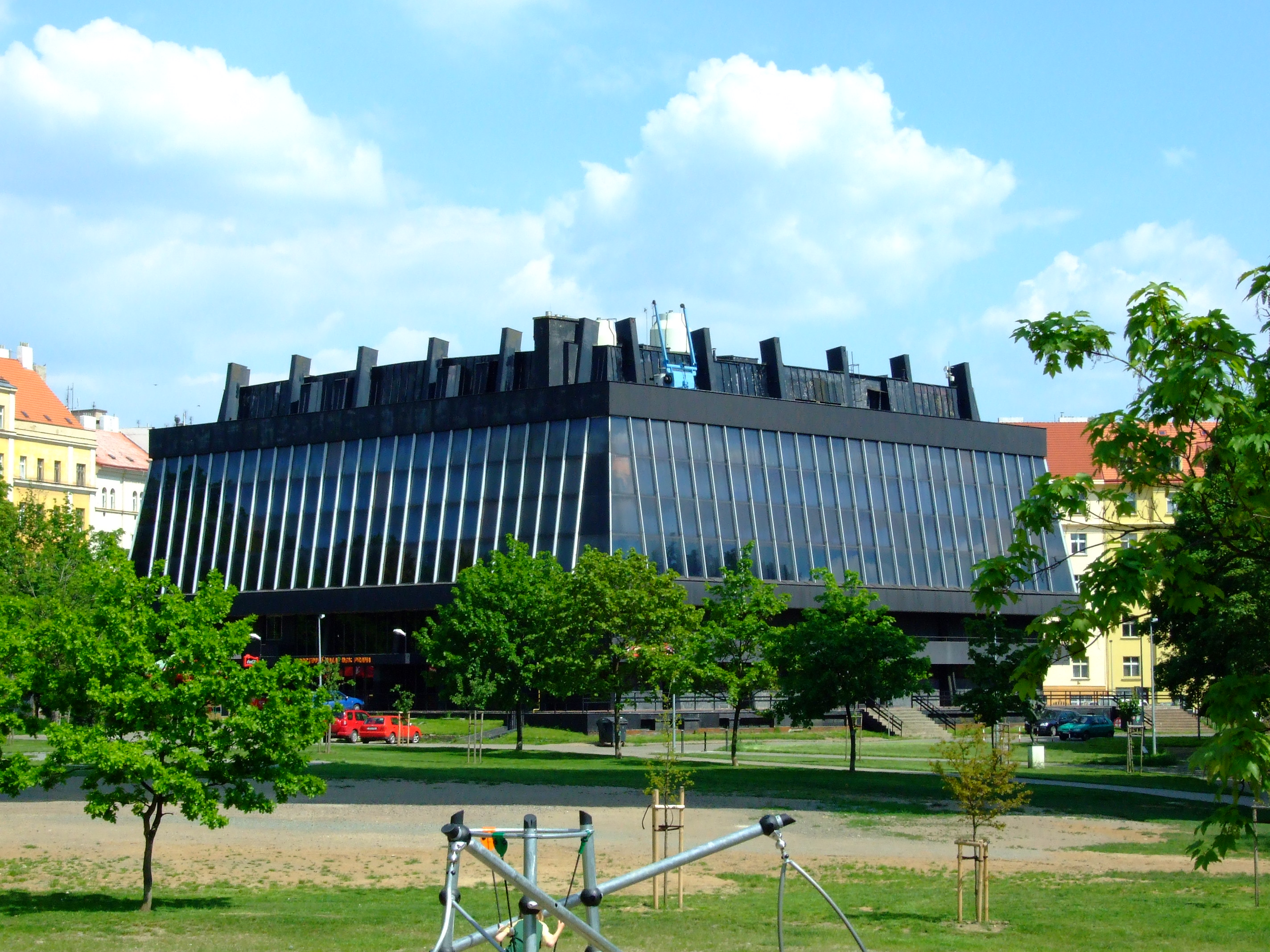
Home arena of USK Praha, Hala Folimanka

The club won the 2nd tier FIBA European Cup Winners' Cup in the 1968–69 season, only a year after losing the same title in the final game of the 1967–68 season against AEK. Slavia also reached the FIBA European Champions Cup Final during the 1965–66 season, where they lost to Simmenthal Milano.

== Honours ==
Total titles: 15

=== Domestic competitions ===
- Czech League

Winners (3): 1993, 1999–00, 2000–01
Runners-up (3): 1995–96, 1996–97, 1998–99

- Czech Republic Cup

Runners-up (3): 1995–96, 2000–01, 2019–20

- Czechoslovak League (defunct)

Winners (11): 1964–65, 1965–66, 1968–69, 1969–70, 1970–71, 1971–72, 1973–74, 1980–81, 1981–82, 1990–91, 1991–92
Runners-up (8): 1962–63, 1963–64, 1966–67, 1967–68, 1972–73, 1975–76, 1976–77, 1992–93

=== European competitions ===
- EuroLeague

Runners-up (1): 1965–66
3rd place (1): 1966–67
Semifinalists (2): 1969–70, 1970–71
Final Four (2): 1966, 1967

- FIBA Saporta Cup (defunct)

Winners (1): 1968–69
Runners-up (1): 1967–68

=== Worldwide competitions ===
- FIBA Intercontinental Cup

4th place (1): 1970

== International record ==
Season	Achievement	Notes
EuroLeague
1965–66	Final	defeated AEK 103–73 in the semi-final, lost to Simmenthal Milano 72–77 in the final (Bologna)
1966–67	Final four	3rd place in Madrid, lost to Simmenthal Milano 97–103 in the semi-final, defeated AŠK Olimpija 88–83 in the 3rd place game
1969–70	Semi-finals	eliminated by CSKA Moscow, 79–107 (L) in Prague, 75–113 (L) in Moscow
1970–71	Semi-finals	eliminated by CSKA Moscow, 83–68 (W) in Prague, 67–94 (L) in Moscow
1971–72	Quarter-finals	3rd place in a group with Jugoplastika, Panathinaikos and Bus Fruit Lier
1972–73	Quarter-finals	4th place in a group with CSKA Moscow, Ignis Varese and Dinamo București
FIBA Saporta Cup
1967–68	Final	lost to AEK, 82–89 in the final (Athens)
1968–69	Champions	defeated Dinamo Tbilisi, 80–74 in the final of FIBA European Cup Winners' Cup in Vienna
1976–77	Quarter-finals	4th place in a group with Radnički Belgrade, Cinzano Milano and Spartak Leningrad
FIBA Intercontinental Cup
1970	Final group stage	4th place in a group with Ignis Varese, Real Madrid, Corinthians and Columbia Sertoma

== The road to the 1968–69 FIBA European Cup Winners' Cup victory ==
Round	Team	Home	Away
1st	Bye		
2nd	(Finland) Helsingin Kisa-Toverit	94–86	76–74
QF	(Poland) Legia Warsaw	113–82	91–80
SF	(Socialist Federal Republic of Yugoslavia) AŠK Olimpija	82–61	83–76
F	(Soviet Union) Dinamo Tbilisi	80–74	

== Current roster ==
Note: Flags indicate national team eligibility at FIBA-sanctioned events. Players may hold other non-FIBA nationalities not displayed.

USK Praha roster
Players
Coaches

Pos.	No.	Nat.	Name
C		(Australia)	Deng Matur Gak
F	0	(Czech Republic)	Cortesao Joao Eduardo
F	1	(Germany)	Jabbar Dejan Bruce
SG	2	(Canada)	Jaden Campbell
PG	3	(Czech Republic)	David Látal
G	5	(Czech Republic)	Matěj Šafařík
G	6	(Czech Republic)	Ondřej Švec
F	8	(Czech Republic)	Tomáš Palas
F	9	(Czech Republic)	Matyáš Ježek
G	10	(Czech Republic)	Mikuláš Kramosil
C	12	(Czech Republic)	Adam Kopřiva
F	13	(Czech Republic)	Dalibor Vlk
C	21	(Czech Republic)	František Fuxa
F	24	(Czech Republic)	Blake Schilb
SG	77	(Czech Republic)	Adam Kolář
PF		(Finland)	Touko Tainamo

Head coach

(United States) David Gale

Assistant coach(es)

(Czech Republic) Martin Bašta
(Czech Republic) Jan Pospíšil

Legend

- (C) Team captain
- Injured

- Roster
Updated: 1 August 2024

== Notable players ==
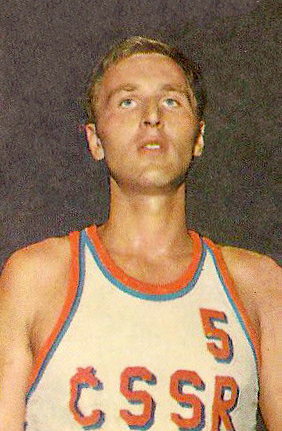
George Zidek

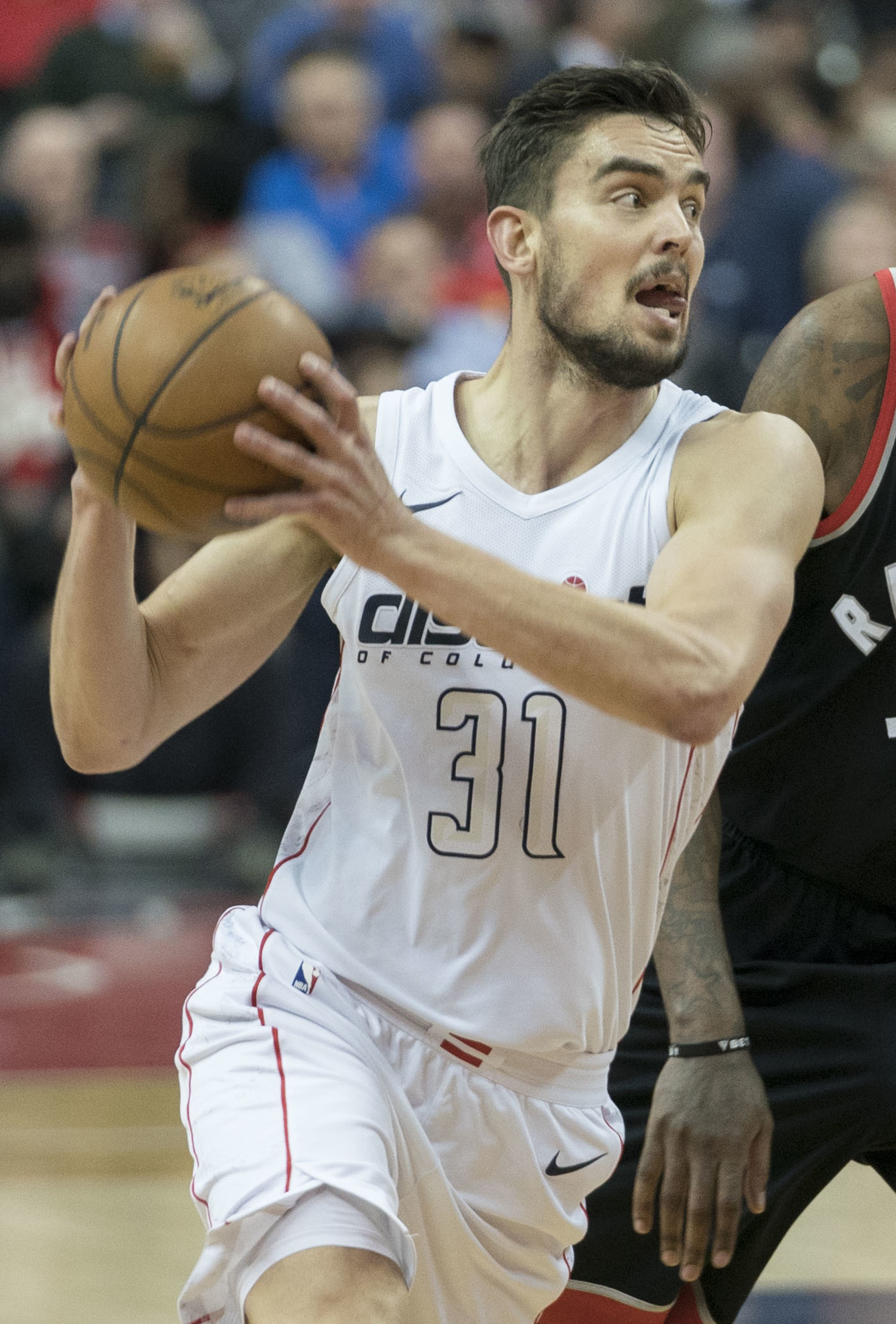
Tomas Satoransky

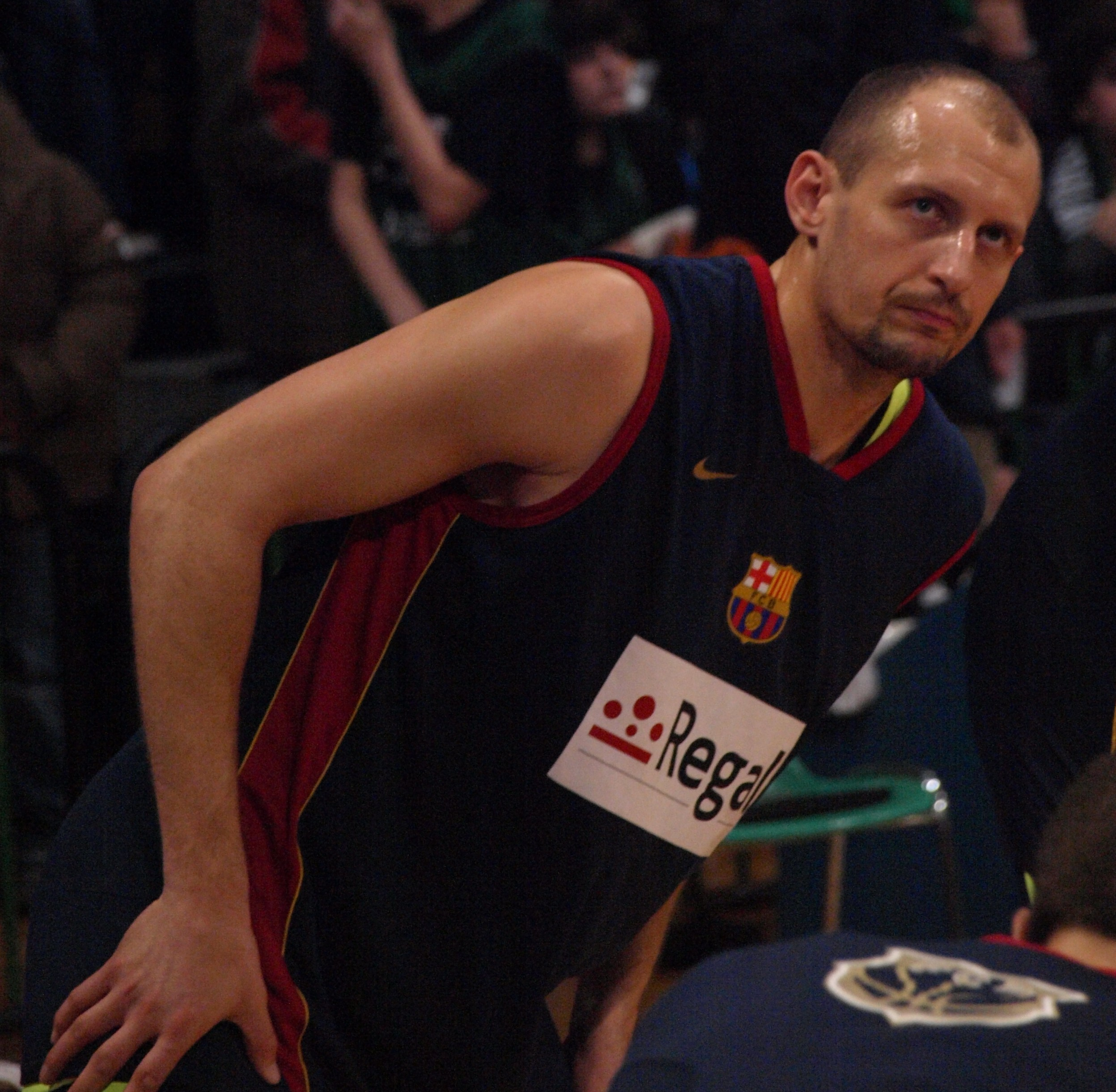
Lubos Barton

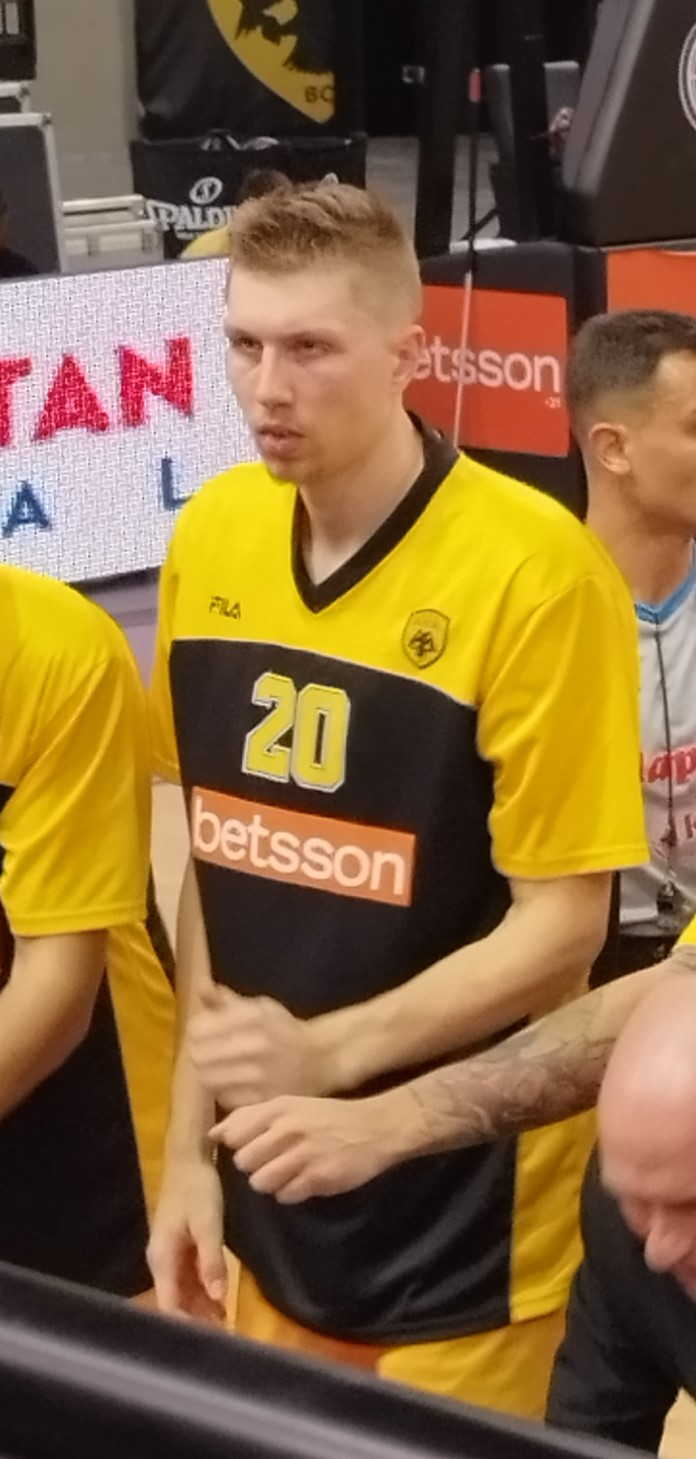
Alexander Madsen

To appear in this section a player must have played at least two seasons for the club AND either:

– Set a club record or won an individual award as a professional player.
– Played at least one official international match for his senior national team at any time.

- (Czech Republic) Tomáš Satoranský
- (Czech Republic) Lubos Barton
- (Czechoslovakia) Vlastibor Klimeš
- (Czech Republic) Jiri Zidek Sr.
- (Finland) Alexander Madsen
- (Czech Republic) Ondřej Sehnal
- (Lithuania) Darius Dimavicius

== See also ==
- USK Praha (women's basketball)
