= Enrico Garbosi =

Italian basketball player and coach

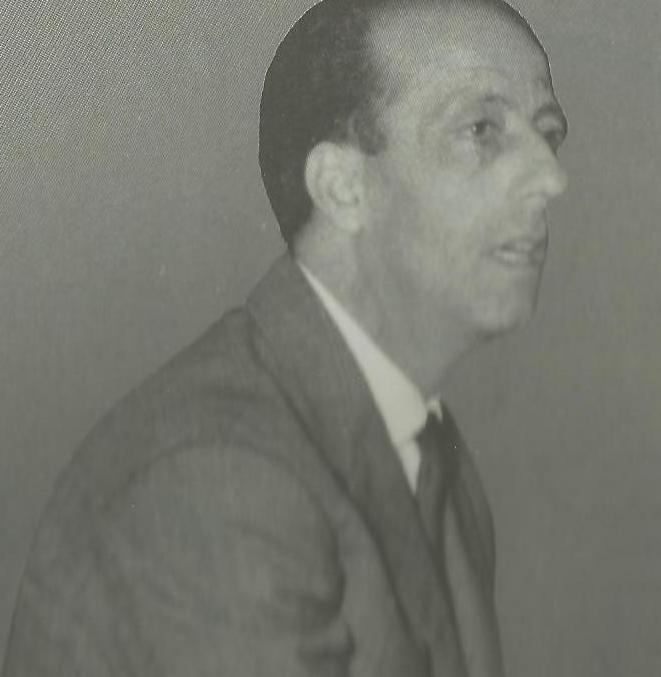

Personal information
- Born: 7 April 1916 Venice, Italy
- Died: 6 January 1973 (aged 56) Varese, Italy
- Occupation(s): Italy (1947) – 5 caps, 14 points

Sport
- Sport: Basketball
- Position: Point guard / guard Coach

Enrico Garbosi (7 April 1916 – 6 January 1973) was an Italian basketball player and coach. He made major contributions to Italian women's basketball, serving as head coach of the national team and winning four consecutive titles with ASDG Comense 1872.

== Career ==
As a player, he won the Italian championships in the 1941–42 and 1942–43 seasons with Reyer Venezia.

In 1948, he was appointed head coach of the Italian women's national basketball team, leading them in 24 games until 1953. He participated in the 1950 European Championship in Budapest (fifth place), the Nice Tournament (second place), and the 1952 European Championship in Moscow (sixth place).

Simultaneously, he won four championships in the women's league with Comense Como, where he stayed for seven years from 1947 to 1954. Between 1951 and 1953, and in the 1955–56 season, he also coached the men's team of Reyer Venezia. From 1956 to 1962, he led Pallacanestro Varese, winning the Italian championship in the 1960–61 season. In the 1962–63 season, he moved to the second team of Varese, Prealpi, finishing in fourth place. In the late 1950s, while concurrently coaching Ignis Varese, he also coached Alessi Fulgor Omegna for three seasons.

He later moved to Milan, where he worked as technical director for All'Onestà. After the dismissal of Vittorio Tracuzzi during the 1969–1970 season, he became co-coach with a young Riccardo Sales, as the official coach, Romano Forastieri, had not yet obtained his coaching license.

The Trofeo Internazionale Città di Varese, a tournament for youth teams, is named in his honor.

== Personal life ==
He was married to Miriam Garbosi.

== Honours ==
=== Player ===
==== Lega Basket Serie A ====
- Reyer Venezia:1941–1942
- Reyer Venezia: 1942–1943

=== Coach ===
==== Lega Basket Serie A ====
- Pallacanestro Varese: 1960–1961

==== Lega Basket Femminile ====
- Comense Como: 1949–50
- Comense Como: 1950–51
- Comense Como: 1951–52
- Comense Como: 1952–53
