= 1973 FIBA Intercontinental Cup =

- League: FIBA Intercontinental Cup
- Sport: Basketball
- Finals champions: (Italy) Ignis Varese
- Runners-up: (Brazil) Sírio

FIBA Intercontinental Cup seasons
- ← 1970 FIBA Intercontinental Cup 1972 Intercontinental Cup of National Teams 1974 FIBA Intercontinental Cup →

The 1973 FIBA Intercontinental Cup William Jones was the 7th edition of the FIBA Intercontinental Cup for men's basketball clubs. It took place at Ginásio do Ibirapuera, São Paulo. From the FIBA European Champions Cup participated Ignis Varese and Jugoplastika, from the South American Club Championship participated Sírio and Vaqueros de Bayamón, and from the NABL participated the Lexington Marathon Oilers.

== Participants ==
Continent	Teams	Clubs	
Europe	2	(Italy) Ignis Varese	(Socialist Federal Republic of Yugoslavia) Jugoplastika
North America	2	(United States) Lexington Marathon Oilers	(Puerto Rico) Vaqueros de Bayamón
South America	1	(Brazil) Sírio	

== League stage ==
Day 1, May 1, 1973

Team 1	Score	Team 2
Ignis Varese (Italy)	94–66	(Puerto Rico) Vaqueros de Bayamón
Sírio (Brazil)	96–75	(Socialist Federal Republic of Yugoslavia) Jugoplastika

Day 2, May 2, 1973

Team 1	Score	Team 2
Lexington Marathon Oilers (United States)	93–103	(Brazil) Sírio
Jugoplastika (Socialist Federal Republic of Yugoslavia)	76–84	(Puerto Rico) Vaqueros de Bayamón

Day 3, May 3, 1973

Team 1	Score	Team 2
Ignis Varese (Italy)	92–78	(Socialist Federal Republic of Yugoslavia) Jugoplastika
Vaqueros de Bayamón (Puerto Rico)	80–76	(United States) Lexington Marathon Oilers

Day 4, May 4, 1973

Team 1	Score	Team 2
Sírio (Brazil)	89–92	(Puerto Rico) Vaqueros de Bayamón
Lexington Marathon Oilers (United States)	89–104	(Italy) Ignis Varese

Day 5, May 5, 1973

Team 1	Score	Team 2
Jugoplastika (Socialist Federal Republic of Yugoslavia)	102–84	(United States) Lexington Marathon Oilers
Sírio (Brazil)	81–74	(Italy) Ignis Varese

== Final standings ==
	Team	Pld	Pts	W	L	PF	PA
1.	(Italy) Ignis Varese	4	6	3	1	364	314
2.	(Brazil) Sírio	4	6	3	1	369	334
3.	(Puerto Rico) Vaqueros de Bayamón	4	6	3	1	322	335
4.	(Socialist Federal Republic of Yugoslavia) Jugoplastika	4	2	1	3	331	356
5.	(United States) Lexington Marathon Oilers	4	0	0	4	342	389

1973 FIBA Intercontinental Cup Champions

Ignis Varese
3rd title
