= Lexington Marathon Oilers =

The Lexington Marathon Oilers, or Lexington Marathon Oil, was a professional basketball team. They were a part of the National Alliance of Basketball Leagues.

== History ==
The Oilers competed at the 1973 edition, and 1984 edition of the Intercontinental Cup.
