= Columbia Sertoma Basketball Club =

Professional basketball team

The Columbia Sertoma Basketball Club was an amateur basketball team sponsored by the Columbia, South Carolina chapter of Sertoma International. They were a part of the National Alliance of Basketball Leagues.

== History ==
The Columbia Sertoma Basketball Club was made up former college basketball players, including Bobby Cremins (South Carolina), Dennis Berkholtz (Kansas State), Joe Brunson (Furman), Richie Mahaffey (Clemson), Bruce Sloan (Kansas), and Tommy Mattocks (NC State). They were the runners-up of the 1970 AAU men's basketball tournament, losing to the Armed Forces All-Stars 77–76 in overtime. They competed at the 1970 edition of the Intercontinental Cup, losing all four of their games.
