= 1970 FIBA Intercontinental Cup =

- League: FIBA Intercontinental Cup
- Sport: Basketball
- Finals champions: (Italy) Ignis Varese
- Runners-up: (Spain) Real Madrid

FIBA Intercontinental Cup seasons
- ← 1969 FIBA Intercontinental Cup 1972 Intercontinental Cup of National Teams 1973 FIBA Intercontinental Cup →

The 1970 FIBA Intercontinental Cup was the 5th edition of the FIBA Intercontinental Cup for men's basketball clubs. It took place at Palazzo dello Sport, Varese. From the FIBA European Champions Cup participated Ignis Varese, Real Madrid, and Slavia VŠ Praha, from the South American Club Championship participated SC Corinthians, and from the NABL participated the Columbia Sertoma.

== Participants ==
Continent	Teams	Clubs		
Europe	3	(Italy) Ignis Varese	(Spain) Real Madrid	(Czechoslovakia) Slavia VŠ Praha
North America	1	(United States) Columbia Sertoma		
South America	1	(Brazil) Corinthians		

== League stage ==
Day 1, September 23, 1970

Team 1	Score	Team 2
Real Madrid (Spain)	71–67	(United States) Columbia Sertoma
Ignis Varese (Italy)	84–57	(Brazil) Corinthians

Day 2, September 24, 1970

Team 1	Score	Team 2
Corinthians (Brazil)	82–74	(Czechoslovakia) Slavia VŠ Praha
Ignis Varese (Italy)	81–60	(Spain) Real Madrid

Day 3, September 25, 1970

Team 1	Score	Team 2
Real Madrid (Spain)	78–77	(Brazil) Corinthians
Slavia VŠ Praha (Czechoslovakia)	81–74	(United States) Columbia Sertoma

Day 4, September 26, 1970

Team 1	Score	Team 2
Corinthians (Brazil)	83–62	(United States) Columbia Sertoma
Ignis Varese (Italy)	71–63	(Czechoslovakia) Slavia VŠ Praha

Day 5, September 27, 1970

Team 1	Score	Team 2
Ignis Varese (Italy)	53–49	(United States) Columbia Sertoma
Real Madrid (Spain)	105–99	(Czechoslovakia) Slavia VŠ Praha

== Final standings ==
	Team	Pld	Pts	W	L	PF	PA
1.	(Italy) Ignis Varese	4	8	4	0	289	229
2.	(Spain) Real Madrid	4	6	3	1	314	324
3.	(Brazil) Corinthians	4	4	2	2	299	298
4.	(Czechoslovakia) Slavia VŠ Praha	4	2	1	3	317	332
5.	(United States) Columbia Sertoma	4	0	0	4	252	288

1970 FIBA Intercontinental Cup Champions

Ignis Varese
2nd title
