= Palasport Lino Oldrini =

Sporting arena in Varese, Italy

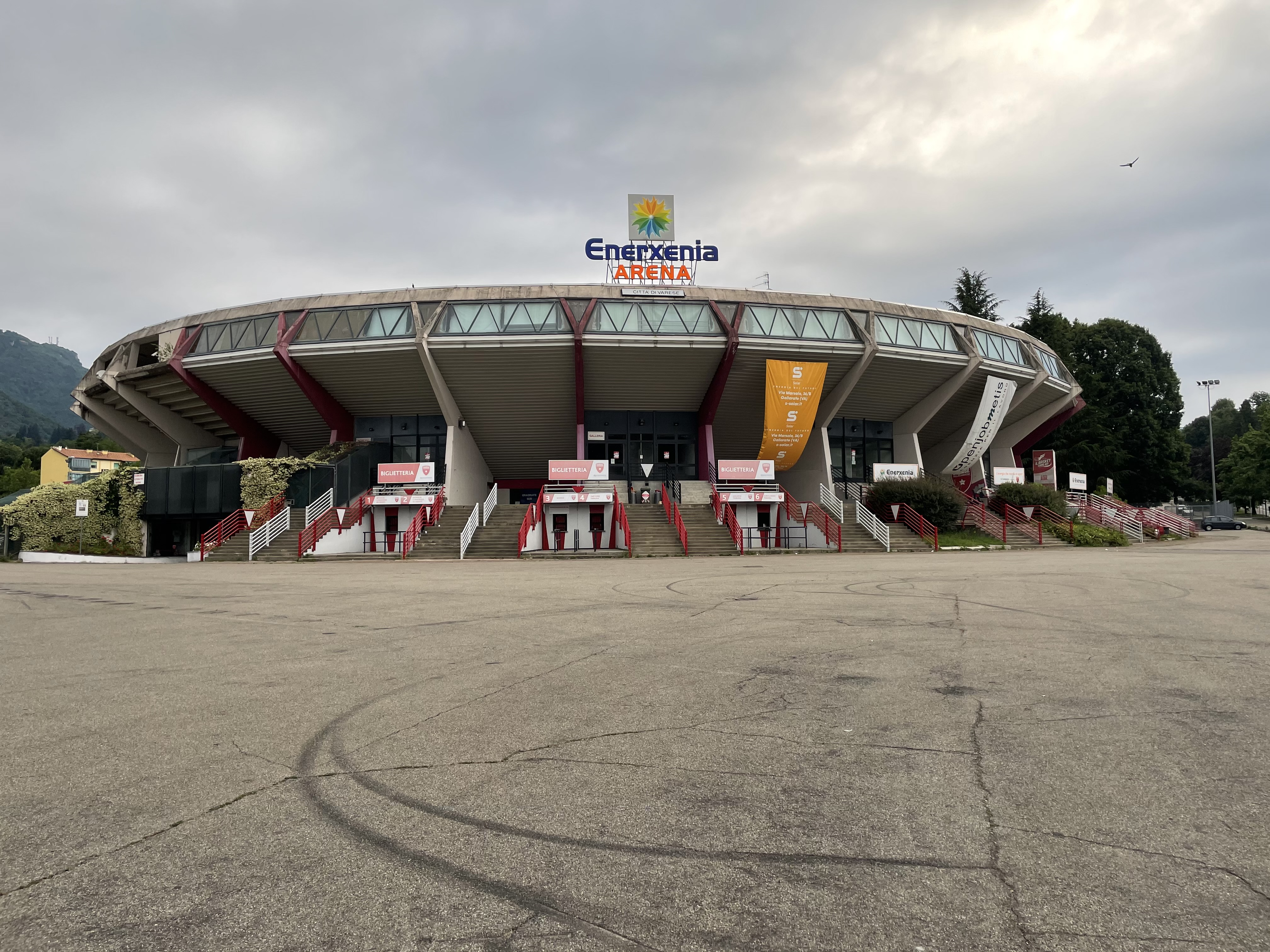
- Interactive map of Palasport Lino Oldrini
- Former names: Palazzo dello Sport Lino Oldrini; PalaIgnis; PalaWhirlpool; PalA2A
- Location: Piazzale Antonio Gramsci, 1 21100 Varese, VA, Italy
- Coordinates: 45°50′9.96″N 8°48′8.60″E
- Owner: City of Varese
- Capacity: Basketball: 5,300
- Surface: 1,080 mq
- Field size: 40x27 mt

Construction
- Opened: 6 December 1964
- Renovated: 1989, 1995, 2011

Tenant
- Pallacanestro Varese (1964–present)

Palasport Lino Oldrini, known as Enerxenia Arena for sponsorship reasons, is an indoor sporting arena that is located in Varese, Italy. The seating capacity of the arena is 5,300 people for basketball games.

== History ==
The arena hosted the 1970 FIBA Intercontinental Cup basketball tournament. It is currently the home arena of the Italian League professional basketball club Pallacanestro Varese.

== See also ==
- List of indoor arenas in Italy

Preceded by Macon Coliseum; Macon	FIBA Intercontinental Cup; Final Venue; 1970	Succeeded by Ginásio do Ibirapuera; São Paulo
