= Ginásio do Ibirapuera =

Indoor gymnasium in São Paulo, Brazil

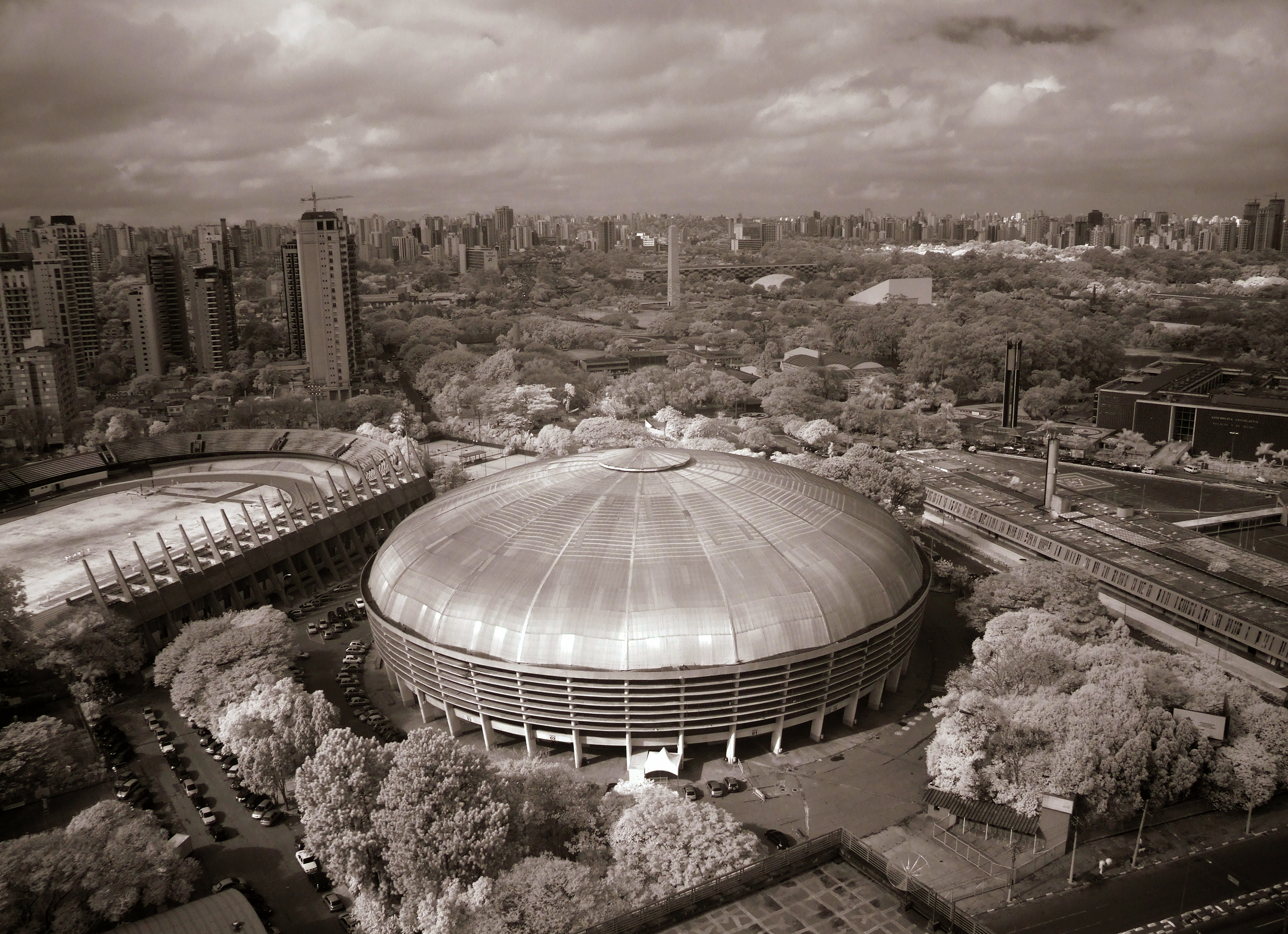
- Interactive map of Ginásio do Ibirapuera
- Full name: Ginásio Estadual Geraldo José de Almeida
- Location: Rua Abílio Soares, 1300, Ibirapuera, São Paulo
- Coordinates: 23.577721°S 46.656048°W
- Owner: São Paulo State Government
- Capacity: 10,200
- Record attendance: over 20,000

Construction
- Groundbreaking: 1954
- Built: 1954–1957
- Opened: January 25, 1957
- Architect: Ícaro de Castro Mello

Ginásio do Ibirapuera (lit. 'Gymnasium of Ibirapuera'), officially named Ginásio Estadual Geraldo José de Almeida is an indoor sporting arena located in São Paulo, Brazil. The seating capacity of the arena is 11,000 people and it was opened on 25 January 1957. It is used mostly for volleyball matches.

== Events ==
Named after famous sports broadcaster and sports commentator Geraldo José de Almeida, in 2004, 2005 and 2006 Ginásio do Ibirapuera hosted the Salonpas Cup matches, and in 2006, the arena hosted the Basketball World Championship for Women. Other notable basketball events include the 1973 Intercontinental Cup, the 1979 edition of the competition in which local E.C. Sírio won the title after a memorable win over Bosna Sarajevo, and the 1984 edition of the same competition in which Banco Roma won the title.

The arena has hosted several UFC events, beginning with UFC on FX: Belfort vs. Bisping on 2013. The Ultimate Fighter Brazil 3 Finale: Miocic vs. Maldonado was held at the arena in 2014. The UFC returned to the arena in 2014 for UFC Fight Night: Belfort vs. Henderson 3. The venue held UFC Fight Night: Bader vs. Nogueira 2 in 2014. In 2017, the promotion held UFC Fight Night: Brunson vs. Machida at the arena. The UFC made its return to the arena in 2018 for UFC Fight Night: Santos vs. Anders. In 2019, the venue hosted UFC Fight Night: Błachowicz vs. Jacaré. The most recent event at the arena was held on 4 November 2023 for UFC Fight Night: Almeida vs. Lewis.

In 2023,2024 and 2025 the venue hosted the Street League Skateboarding Super Crown.

The arena has a history of hosting tennis competitions, such as the Billie Jean King Cup in the ties contested by Brazil against Germany on the first semester of 2024 and by Brazil against Argentina on the second semester of 2024. It was also the venue for the ATP 250 Brasil Open, in 2012,2013,2014 and 2015 and later in 2018 and 2019.

The venue has hosted many international concerts, such as Kylie Minogue, A-ha, Santana, Van Halen, Metallica, Cyndi Lauper, Sade, Michael Bublé, Queen + Adam Lambert and more.

The venue will also host an event of Valorant's esports, the VCT LOCK//IN, featuring all 30 of the tour's partnered teams.

== See also ==
- List of indoor arenas in Brazil

Events and tenants
Preceded by Palazzo dello Sport; Varese	FIBA Intercontinental Cup; Final Venue; 1973	Succeeded by Palacio de los Deportes; Mexico City
Preceded by Estadio Obras Sanitarias; Buenos Aires	FIBA Intercontinental Cup; Final Venue; 1979	Succeeded by Dvorana Skenderija; Sarajevo
Preceded by Dvorana Skenderija; Sarajevo	FIBA Intercontinental Cup; Final Venue; 1981	Succeeded by Maaspoort Sports end Events; Den Bosch
Preceded by Estadio Obras Sanitarias; Buenos Aires	FIBA Intercontinental Cup; Final Venue; 1984	Succeeded by Palau Blaugrana; Barcelona
Preceded by Olympic Sports Center Gymnasium; Nanjing	World Women's Handball Championship; Final Venue; 2011	Succeeded by Belgrade Arena; Belgrade
Preceded by HSBC Arena; Rio de Janeiro	FIBA Intercontinental Cup; Final Venue; 2015	Succeeded by Fraport Arena; Frankfurt
