= Pallacanestro Varese =

Professional basketball club

Openjobmetis Varese
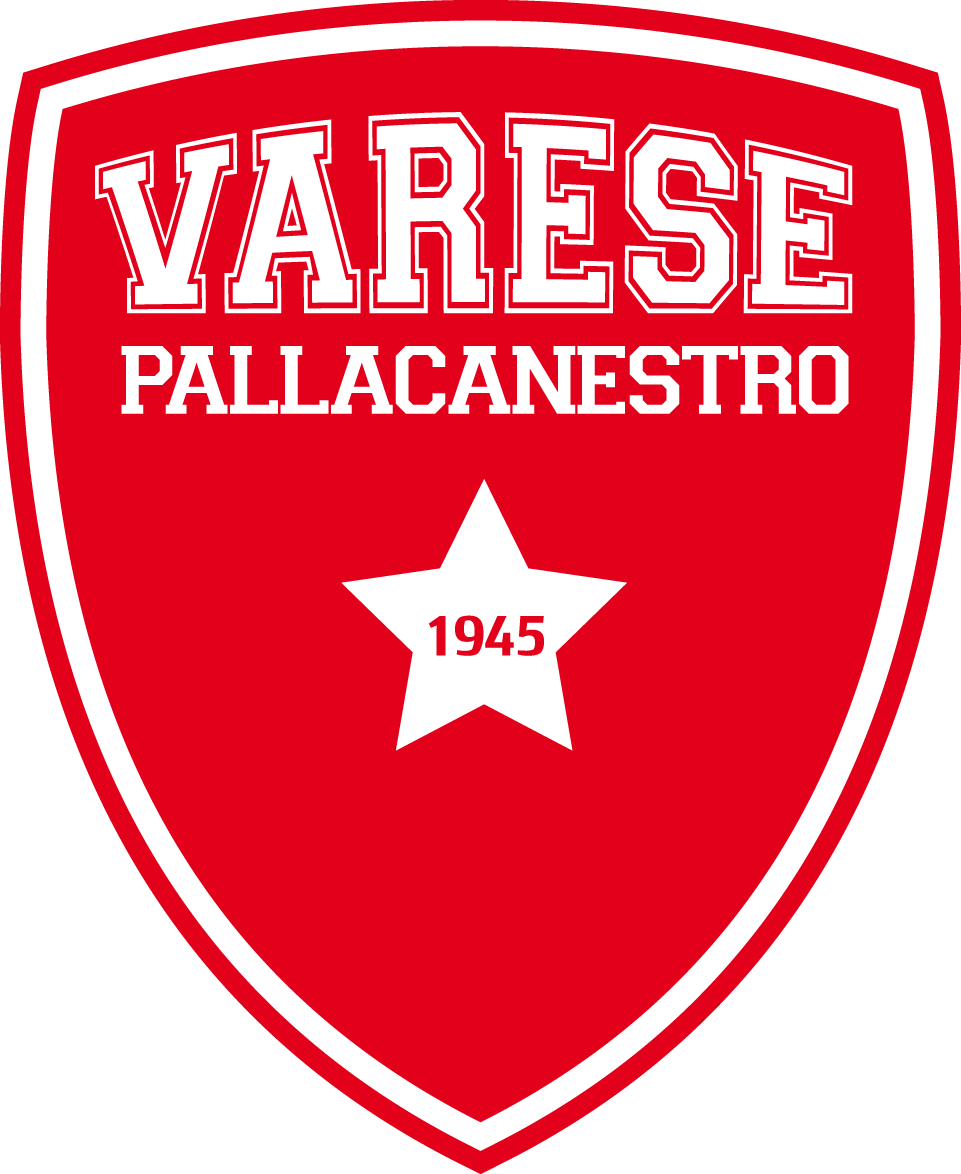
- Leagues: LBA; Champions League
- Founded: 1945; 81 years ago
- History: Pallacanestro Varese (1946–present)
- Arena: Palasport Lino Oldrini
- Capacity: 5,107
- Location: Varese, Italy
- Team colors: White, Red
- CEO: Luis Scola
- President: Antonio Bulgheroni
- General manager: Maksim Horowitz and Zachary Sogolow
- Head coach: Ioannis Kastritis
- Ownership: Luis Scola, Varese nel cuore s.c. a r.l., Il Basket Siamo Noi
- Championships: 10 Italian Leagues; 4 Italian Cups; 1 Italian Supercup; 3 Intercontinental Cups; 5 EuroLeagues; 2 Saporta Cups
- Website: pallacanestrovarese.it
Home	Away

Pallacanestro Varese, also called by its current sponsor's name, the Openjobmetis Varese, is an Italian professional basketball club based in Varese, Lombardy. Founded in 1945, the team plays in the Italian first division LBA.

For past club sponsorship names, see sponsorship names.

== History ==
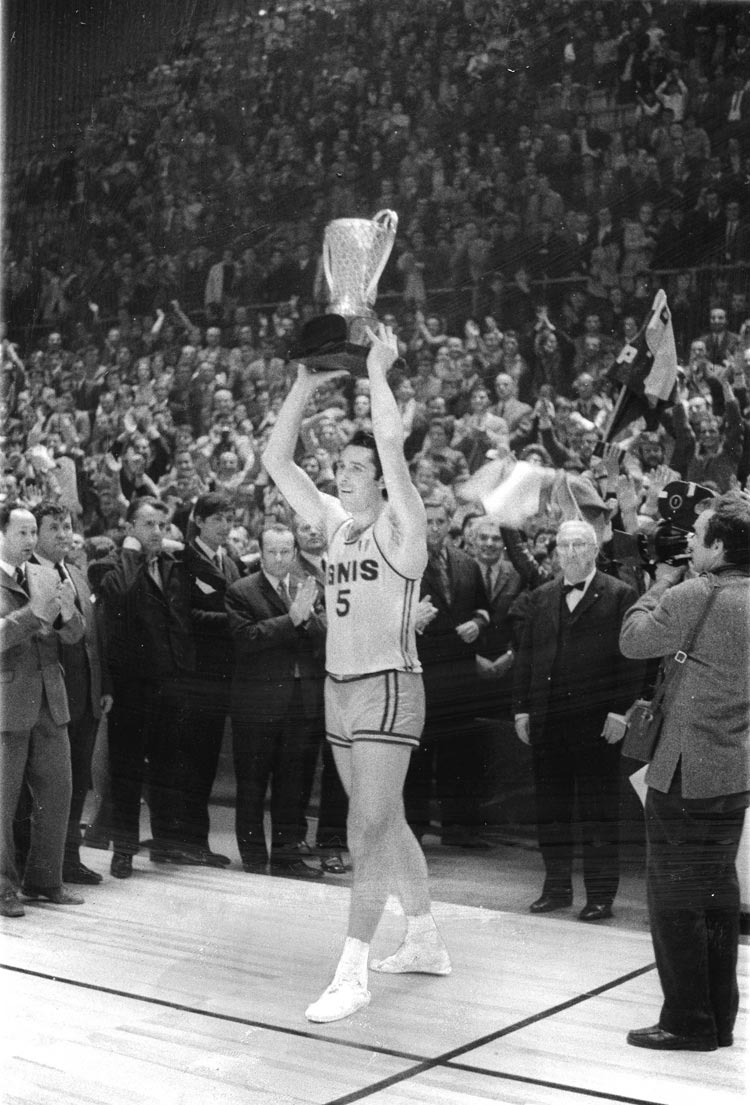
Varese captain Ottorino Flaborea lifts the FIBA European Champions Cup trophy after defeating CSKA Moscow in the final at Sarajevo's Skenderija on 4 April 1970—the first of the club's five European titles during the 1970s.

Basketball was introduced in Varese in 1945, with the creation of the historical club, Pallacanestro Varese. The first sponsors were introduced 8 years later in 1954, including Storm and Ignis, followed by Emerson, Turisanda, Cagiva, Star, Ciaocrem, Divarese, Ranger, Metis, Whirlpool, and the most recent, Cimberio. Varese is also famous due to the lack of its having a main sponsor in the mid-1990s (something unusual in the Italian basketball league), and the choice of its franchise name, the Varese Roosters.

Since their creation, Pallancanestro Varese has won 10 Italian first-tier level LBA titles, in the years 1961, 1964, 1969, 1970, 1971, 1973, 1974, 1977, 1978, and their last Italian League title, won 21 years after the previous title, in 1999. With 10 titles, Pallacanestro Varese is the third most winning team ever in the Italian League, after Olimpia Milano and Virtus Bologna.

As it is shown by its roll of honors, Varese was extremely competitive in the 1970s, when the club played in the European-wide first-tier level FIBA European Champions Cup (now called EuroLeague), and played in ten finals in a row, winning 5 of them, in the years 1970, 1972, 1973, 1975, and 1976. Between 1956 and 1975, the club was named Ignis Varese. What was the club's golden age had begun some years before, as Varese conquered the FIBA Intercontinental Cup in 1966, and repeated the same title 4 and 7 years later, in the middle of the club's greatest decade in 1970 and 1973. Varese accomplished the great feat of winning the Triple Crown, winning all the trophies available in 1973, with the legendary Professor Aca Nikolić as the team's head coach. Varese also won two championships of the European-wide first-tier level FIBA European Cup Winners' Cup, in 1967 and 1980, and four Italian Cups, in 1969, 1970, 1971, and 1973.

Varese's great age ended in the early nineties, when the team dropped down to the Italian second division. Soon, the club took its revenge, coming up once again to the Italian top-tier level league, and after 5 years time became the real team to watch in the Italian League's playoffs, as it succeeded in winning its historical 10th Italian League title in 1999, with Carlo Recalcati (who later coached the Italian national team), leading the way as the club's head coach. Varese has never repeated that triumph so far, but that success is still remembered to this day. Varese has been trying to return to the top of the Italian League and European-wide competitions in the years since.

== Players ==
=== Current roster ===
Note: Flags indicate national team eligibility at FIBA-sanctioned events. Players may hold other non-FIBA nationalities not displayed.

Openjobmetis Varese roster
Players
Coaches

Pos.	No.	Nat.	Name	Ht.	Wt.	Age
SF	2	(Italy)	Alviti, Davide	2.00 m (6 ft 7 in)	88 kg (194 lb)	29 – 5 November 1996
G	3	(United States)	Duke Jr., David	1.93 m (6 ft 4 in)	93 kg (205 lb)	27 – 13 October 1999
G	5	(Argentina)	Villa, Mauro	1.93 m (6 ft 4 in)		22 – 7 July 2004
G	7	(Australia)	McDowell-White, Will	1.96 m (6 ft 5 in)	89 kg (196 lb)	28 – 13 April 1998
SG	8	(Italy)	Della Valle, Amedeo	1.94 m (6 ft 4 in)	90 kg (198 lb)	33 – 11 April 1993
F	11	(Serbia)	Nikolić, Stefan	2.06 m (6 ft 9 in)	95 kg (209 lb)	29 – 29 May 1997
SG	12	(United States)	Hale, Hunter	1.91 m (6 ft 3 in)	84 kg (185 lb)	29 – 25 June 1997
PG	13	(Italy)	Librizzi, Matteo	1.80 m (5 ft 11 in)	70 kg (154 lb)	24 – 6 April 2002
C	15	(United States)	Renfro, Nate	2.03 m (6 ft 8 in)	93 kg (205 lb)	29 – 11 December 1996
C	17	(France)	Kamagate, Ismaël	2.11 m (6 ft 11 in)	100 kg (220 lb)	25 – 17 January 2001
F	22	(United States)	Roby, Isaiah	2.03 m (6 ft 8 in)	104 kg (229 lb)	28 – 3 February 1998
C	34	(Italy)	Ladurner, Maximilian	2.07 m (6 ft 9 in)	95 kg (209 lb)	24 – 6 December 2001
PF	35	(Italy)	Ikangi, Iris	2.00 m (6 ft 7 in)	87 kg (192 lb)	32 – 21 February 1994

Head coach

- (Greece) Ioannis Kastritis

Assistant coach(es)

- (Italy) Matteo Jemoli
- (Italy) Tommaso Sacchetti

Legend

- (C) Team captain
- Injured

- Roster
Updated: September 20, 2026

== Season by season ==
Season	Tier	League	Pos.	Italian Cup	European competitions	
2004–05	1	Serie A	14th			
2005–06	1	Serie A	10th			
2006–07	1	Serie A	7th			
2007–08	1	Serie A	18th			
2008–09	2	Serie A2	1st			
2009–10	1	Serie A	11th			
2010–11	1	Serie A	8th			
2011–12	1	Serie A	8th			
2012–13	1	Serie A	3rd			
2013–14	1	Serie A	10th		1 Euroleague	QR1
2013–14	1	Serie A	10th		2 Eurocup	RS
2014–15	1	Serie A	11th			
2015–16	1	LBA	9th		3 FIBA Europe Cup	RU
2016–17	1	LBA	12th		3 Champions League	RS
2017–18	1	LBA	6th			
2018–19	1	LBA	9th			
2019–20	1	LBA	10th			
2020–21	1	LBA	14th			
2021–22	1	LBA	12th			
2022–23	1	LBA	13th	Quarterfinalist		
2023–24	1	LBA	14th		3 Champions League	QR2
2023–24	1	LBA	14th		4 FIBA Europe Cup	SF
2024–25	1	LBA	12th			

== Honours ==
Total titles: 25

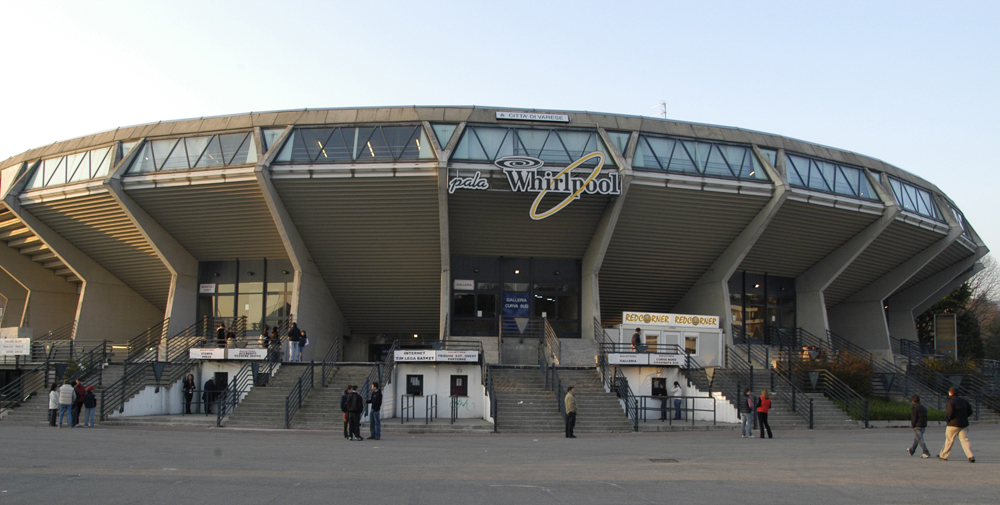
Palasport Lino Oldrini

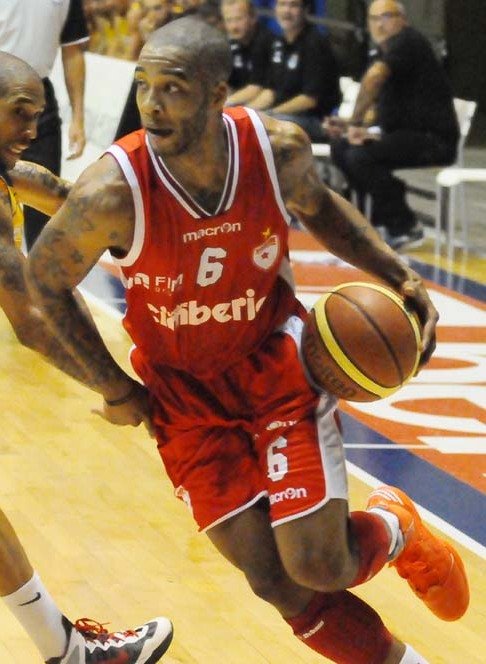
Adrian Banks

=== Domestic competitions ===
- Italian League

Winners (10): 1960–61, 1963–64, 1968–69, 1969–70, 1970–71, 1972–73, 1973–74, 1976–77, 1977–78, 1998–99
Runners-up (10): 1948–49, 1961–62, 1962–63, 1964–65, 1965–66, 1966–67, 1971–72, 1974–75, 1975–76, 1989–90

- Italian Cup

Winners (4): 1968–69, 1969–70, 1970–71, 1972–73
Runners-up (5): 1971–72, 1984–85, 1987–88, 1998–99, 2012–13

- Italian Supercup

Winners (1): 1999
Runners-up (1): 2013

=== European competitions ===
- EuroLeague

Winners (5): 1969–70, 1971–72, 1972–73, 1974–75, 1975–76
Runners-up (5): 1970–71, 1973–74, 1976–77, 1977–78, 1978–79
Semifinalists (1): 1964–65

- FIBA Saporta Cup (defunct)

Winners (2): 1966–67, 1979–80
Semifinalists (2): 1967–68, 1980–81

- FIBA Korać Cup (defunct)

Runners-up (1): 1984–85
Semifinalists (1): 1985–86

- FIBA Europe Cup

Runners-up (1): 2015–16

=== Worldwide competitions ===
- FIBA Intercontinental Cup

Winners (3): 1966, 1970, 1973
Runners-up (4): 1967, 1974, 1976, 1977
3rd place (1): 1979
4th place (1): 1978

- McDonald's Championship

4th place (1): 1999

=== Individual club awards ===
- Triple Crown

Winners (2): 1969–70, 1972–73

== International record ==
Season	Achievement	Notes
EuroLeague
1964–65	Semi-finals	eliminated by CSKA Moscow, 57–58 (L) in Varese and 67–69 (L) in Moscow
1969–70	Champions	defeated CSKA Moscow, 79–74 in the final of European Champions Cup in Sarajevo
1970–71	Final	lost to CSKA Moscow, 53–67 in the final (Antwerp)
1971–72	Champions	defeated Jugoplastika, 70–69 in the final of European Champions Cup in Tel Aviv
1972–73	Champions	defeated CSKA Moscow, 71–66 in the final of European Champions Cup in Liège
1973–74	Final	lost to Real Madrid, 82–84 in the final (Nantes)
1974–75	Champions	defeated Real Madrid, 79–66 in the final of European Champions Cup in Antwerp
1975–76	Champions	defeated Real Madrid, 81–74 in the final of European Champions Cup in Geneva
1976–77	Final	lost to Maccabi Tel Aviv, 77–78 in the final (Belgrade)
1977–78	Final	lost to Real Madrid, 67–75 in the final (Munich)
1978–79	Final	lost to Bosna, 93–96 in the final (Grenoble)
FIBA Saporta Cup
1966–67	Champions	defeated Maccabi Tel Aviv, 77–67 (W) in Varese and 67–68 (L) in Tel Aviv in the double final of European Cup Winners' Cup
1967–68	Semi-finals	eliminated by AEK, 78–60 (W) in Varese and 52–72 (L) in Athens
1979–80	Champions	defeated Gabetti Cantù, 90–88 in the final of European Cup Winners' Cup in Milan
1980–81	Semi-finals	eliminated by Squibb Cantù, 84–94 (L) in Varese and 65–78 (L) in Cantù
FIBA Korać Cup
1984–85	Final	lost to Simac Milano, 78–91 in the final (Brussels)
1985–86	Semi-finals	eliminated by Mobilgirgi Caserta, 84–71 (W) in Varese and 75–91 (L) in Caserta
1995–96	Quarter-finals	eliminated by Stefanel Milano, 72–81 (L) in Varese and 89–90 (L) in Milan
EuroCup
2002–03	Quarter-finals	eliminated by Adecco Estudiantes, 59–77 (L) in Madrid and 88–101 (L) in Varese
2003–04	Quarter-finals	eliminated by Real Madrid, 67–68 (L) in Madrid and 57–62 (L) in Varese
FIBA Europe Cup
2015–16	Final	lost to Fraport Skyliners, 62–66 in the final (Chalon-sur-Saône)
Intercontinental Cup
1966	Champions	defeated Corinthians 66–59 in the final of Intercontinental Cup in Madrid
1967	Final	lost to Akron Goodyear Wingfoots, 72–78 in the final (Rome)
1970	Champions	Intercontinental Cup Champions with a 4–0 record in a league tournament in Varese
1973	Champions	Intercontinental Cup Champions with a 3–1 record in a league tournament in São Paulo
1974	Runners-up	Runners-up with a 4–1 record in a league tournament in Mexico City
1975	5th place	5th place with a 2–3 record in a league tournament in Varese
1976	Runners-up	Runners-up with a 4–1 record in a league tournament in Buenos Aires
1977	Runners-up	Runners-up with a 3–2 record in a league tournament in Madrid
1978	4th place	4th place with a 1–3 record in a league tournament in Buenos Aires
1979	3rd place	3rd place with a 2–2 record in a league tournament in São Paulo
McDonald's Championship
1999	4th place	4th place in Milan, lost to San Antonio Spurs 86–96 in the semi-final, lost to Žalgiris 78–97 in the 3rd place game

== Notable players ==
Note: Flags indicate national team eligibility at FIBA-sanctioned events. Players may hold other non-FIBA nationalities not displayed.

Criteria

To appear in this section a player must have either:

- Set a club record or won an individual award while at the club
- Played at least one official international match for their national team at any time
- Played at least one official NBA match at any time.

- (Italy) Ivan Bisson
- (Italy) Paolo Conti
- (Italy) Marcelo Damiao
- (Italy) Andrea De Nicolao
- (Italy) Giancarlo Ferrero
- (Italy) Fabrizio Della Fiori
- (Italy) Giacomo Galanda
- (Italy) Andrea Meneghin
- (Italy) Dino Meneghin
- (Italy) Aldo Ossola
- (Italy) Achille Polonara
- (Italy) Gianmarco Pozzecco
- (Italy) Stefano Rusconi
- (Italy) Romeo Sacchetti
- (Italy) Paolo Vittori
- (Italy) Marino Zanatta
- (United States) Anthony Bowie
- (United States) Frank Brickowski
- (United States) Tyler Cain
- (United States) Bill Campion
- (United States) Geno Carlisle
- (United States) Tim Bassett
- (United States) Toney Douglas
- (United States) (Armenia) Bryant Dunston
- (United States) Derek Hamilton
- (United States) Delonte Holland
- (United States) Frank Johnson
- (United States) Jalen Jones
- (United States) Anthony Gennari
- (United States) Kevin Magee
- (United States) (Italy) Nico Mannion
- (United States) Stan McKenzie
- (United States) Billy Keys
- (United States) Rusty LaRue
- (United States) Pat Cummings
- (United States) Bill Edwards
- (United States) Wes Matthews
- (United States) Jerry McCullough
- (United States) Larry Micheaux
- (United States) Miles Simon
- (United States) Ron Slay
- (United States) (Israel) Alex Tyus
- (United States) Corny Thompson
- (United States) Eddie Lee Wilkins
- (United States) Leon Wood
- (United States) Charlie Yelverton
- (United States) Reggie Theus
- (United States) Tyrone Nesby
- (United States) Charles Pittman
- (United States) Bob Morse
- (United States) DeJuan Collins
- (Argentina) Daniel Farabello
- (Argentina) Gabriel Fernández
- (Argentina) Luis Scola
- (Bosnia and Herzegovina) Marko Šćekić
- (Canada) Thomas Scrubb
- (Croatia) Arijan Komazec
- (Croatia) Mate Skelin
- (Croatia) Veljko Mršić
- (Croatia) Roko Ukić
- (Croatia) Rok Stipčević
- (Slovenia) Boris Gorenc
- (Slovenia) Sani Bečirović
- (Slovenia) Aleksandar Ćapin
- (France) Alain Digbeu
- (Finland) Antero Lehto
- (Finland) Teemu Rannikko
- (Finland) Olivier Nkamhoua
- (Estonia) Kristjan Kangur
- (Estonia) Janar Talts
- (Estonia) Siim-Sander Vene
- (Puerto Rico) Daniel Santiago
- (Slovakia) Richard Petruška
- (Russia) Pavel Podkolzin
- (Mexico) Manuel Raga
- (Serbia) Nikola Lončar
- (Serbia) Aleksa Avramović
- (Greece) Fedon Matheou
- (Belgium) D. J. Mbenga
- (Nigeria) Stan Okoye

== Head coaches ==
- (Italy) Vittorio Tracuzzi (1948–54)
- (Italy) Valerio Giobbi (1954–55)
- (United States) Yogi Bough (1955–56)
- (Italy) Enrico Garbosi (1956–62)
- (Italy) Vittorio Tracuzzi (1954–55 & 1966–68)
- (Italy) Nico Messina (1968–69 & 1977–78)
- (Socialist Federal Republic of Yugoslavia) Aleksandar Nikolić (1969–73)
- (Italy) Sandro Gamba (1973–77)
- (Italy) Edoardo Rusconi (1978–80, 1993–97 & 2003–04)
- (United States) Joe Isaac (1986–89 & 1992–93)
- (Italy) Carlo Recalcati (1997–99 & 2010–12)
- (Italy) Valerio Bianchini (1999 & 2007–08)
- (Italy) Gianfranco Lombardi (2000–01)
- (France) Grégor Beugnot (2001–03)
- (Argentina) Ruben Magnano (2004–07)
- (Croatia) Veljko Mršić (2007–08)
- (Italy) Stefano Pillastrini (2008–10)
- (Italy) Francesco Vitucci (2012–13)
- (Italy) Fabrizio Frates (2013–14)
- (Italy) Stefano Bizzozi (2014)
- (Italy) Gianmarco Pozzecco (2014–15)
- (Italy) Attilio Caja (2015 & 2016–20)
- (Italy) Paolo Moretti (2015–16)
- (Italy) Massimo Bulleri (2020–21)
- (Italy) Adriano Vertemati (2021–22)
- (Netherlands) Johan Roijakkers (2022)
- (Italy) Alberto Seravalli (2022)
- (United States) Matt Brase (2022–2023)
- (United States) Tom Bialaszewski (2023–2024)
- (Argentina) Herman Mandole (2024–2025)
- (Greece) Ioannis Kastritis (2025–present)

== Sponsorship names ==
Through the years, due to sponsorship deals, it has been also known as:

- Storm (1954–56)
- Ignis (1956–75)
- Mobilgirgi (1975–78)
- Emerson (1978–80)
- Turisanda (1980–81)
- Cagiva (1981–83)
- Star (1983–84)
- Ciao Crem (1984–85)
- Divarese (1985–89)
- Ranger (1989–92)
- Cagiva (1992–97)
- No name sponsorship (1997–99)
- Varese Roosters (1999–01)
- Metis (2001–04)
- Casti Group (2004–05)
- Whirlpool (2005–07)
- Cimberio (2007–2014)
- OpenjobMetis (2014–present)

== Shirt sponsors and manufacturers ==
Period	Kit manufacturer
1997–1999	Kappa
1999–2001	Reebok
2002–2003	(unspecified)
2003–2006	Macron
2006-2008	Nike
2008–2010	Aries
2010–2014	Macron
2014–2015	Adidas
2015–2018	Spalding
2018–present	Macron

== Colors and badge ==
City crest
(1997–99)

Roosters crest
(1999–01)

Casti Group crest
(2004–05)

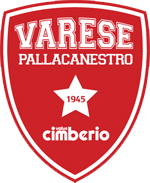
Cimberio Varese crest
(2010–14)

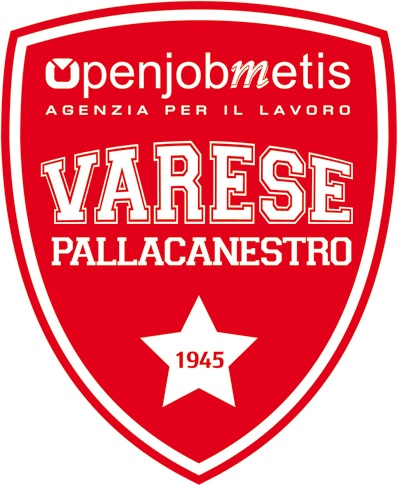
Openjobmetis Varese crest
(2014–present)
