= National Alliance of Basketball Leagues =

American basketball league (1961–1973)

- Sport: Basketball
- Founded: 1961
- Folded: 1973
- Country: United States

The National Alliance of Basketball Leagues (NABL) (founded 1961) is the descendant of the industrial-based basketball clubs that formed into the National Basketball League (NBL) in the early 1930s.

== History ==
=== Origins in the 1930s ===
The league was the brainchild of Indianapolis grocer Irv Kautsky, who sponsored the Indianapolis Kautskys club team, and Goodyear Tire Company, who originally sponsored the Akron Wingfoots. After a false start in the early 1930s, the league was restarted in 1938, with the Wingfoots winning the initial NBL title. By World War II, both the Wingfoots and the Firestone Tire Company's Non-Skids had suspended play, but other seminal pro teams such as the Ft. Wayne Zollner Pistons (now the Detroit Pistons), Syracuse Nationals (now the Philadelphia 76ers), Rochester Royals (now the Sacramento Kings), Minneapolis Lakers (now the Los Angeles Lakers), and Tri-Cities BlackHawks (now the Atlanta Hawks), all of whom are currently playing in the NBA, had joined.
After World War II, the fledgling Basketball Association of America was established by arena owners in large cities to try to capture the popularity of the NBL teams from the smaller communities. This attempt failed miserably as 13 of the 16 BAA teams folded. Undaunted, the remaining BAA teams, the Philadelphia Warriors, Boston Celtics, and New York Knicks convinced the top NBL teams to join with them and they formed the NBA. Thus, the early NBA was composed mostly of teams brought over from the NBL and three BAA teams.

=== 1947–1961: Creation of the NIBL ===
The remaining NBL teams reformed and changed the name to the National Industrial Basketball League (NIBL) where teams such as the Denver Truckers, Chicago Jamaco Saints, Akron Wingfoots, Phillips 66ers, Peoria Cats, Philadelphia Tapers, Lexington Marathon Oilers and Cleveland Pipers thrived as club teams. In the 1960s the league recognized the changing sponsorship of the teams away from the large industrial companies and renamed it the National AAU Basketball League (NABL).

=== List of champions ===
1948: Milwaukee Harnischfegers
1949: Phillips 66ers
1950: Phillips 66ers
1951: Phillips 66ers
1952: Phillips 66ers
1953: Phillips 66ers
1954: Phillips 66ers and Peoria Caterpillars
1955: Phillips 66ers
1956: Phillips 66ers
1957: Phillips 66ers
1958: Phillips 66ers and Wichita Vickers
1959: Denver-Chicago Truckers
1960: Phillips 66ers
1961: Cleveland Pipers

=== 1961–1963: Decline ===
During the early 1960s, the Pipers and the Tapers left to join the Hawaii Chiefs, Kansas City Steers, Los Angeles Jets and other teams to form the American Basketball League; when this venture folded, some of these teams returned to the NABL.

By the end of the 1970s, the NABL teams elected to adapt touring schedules rather than league schedules and the NABL format was mothballed until it was brought back in the 1990s when many of the legendary teams had been restarted under a new wave of sponsors. Today, the NABL teams are focused on preparing post-college players for the opportunity to play pro basketball overseas.

== National Amateur Athletic Union Basketball League (1966–1973) ==
In 1966, the NABL organized the National Amateur Athletic Union Basketball League, with the league's champions playing at FIBA's Intercontinental Cup, as the North American Champions. The Akron Wingfoots won the title on the three occasions that they represented the country at the FIBA Intercontinental Cup. One factor that would help result in the league's decline and eventual downfall was when the newly created American Basketball Association, a rivaling professional basketball league that was meant to compete with the National Basketball Association at the time before eventually forcing a merger with them, sought to take star talents from this league's teams like Larry Brown from the Akron Goodyear Wingfoots, Darel Carrier and John Beasley of the Phillips 66ers, and Steve "Snapper" Jones and Levern Tart of the Jamaco Saints in order to establish quality looking rosters that could at least feel comparable to the NBA's rosters at the time.

=== List of Champions ===
1967: Akron Goodyear Wingfoots
1968: Akron Goodyear Wingfoots
1969: Akron Goodyear Wingfoots
1970: Currently Unknown
1971: Lexington Marathon Oil
1972: Dayton Sanders Stone
1973: Dayton Utopians

== Members ==
The following leagues were members of the NABL in the 90s and noughties.

- CBA
- IBL
- PBL
- UBL
- WBA

== See also ==
- National Industrial Basketball League
