= FIBA Intercontinental Cup =

Basketball competition for clubs

- Organising body: FIBA
- Founded: 1965; 61 years ago
- First season: 1965
- Confederation: 6 regions: FIBA Americas (Central and South America); FIBA Europe (Europe); FIBA Africa (Africa); FIBA Asia (Asia); FIBA Oceania (Oceania); NBA G League (North America)
- Number of teams: 6
- Current champions: (USA Basketball) NBA G League United (1st title)
- Most championships: (Spain) Real Madrid (5 titles)
- Website: intercontinentalcup.basketball
- 2026 FIBA Intercontinental Cup

The FIBA Intercontinental Cup, previously known as the FIBA World Cup for Champion Clubs and the FIBA Club World Cup, is an annual international men's basketball competition organised by FIBA, the sport's global governing body. The competition features the club champions of the five FIBA continental confederations, as well as one representative from the NBA G League.

Historically, its purpose has been to gather the premier basketball clubs from each of the world's geographical zones, and to officially decide the best basketball club of the world, which is officially crowned as the world club champion. The World Cup for Clubs has been contended mainly by the champions of the continents and/or world geographical regions that are of the highest basketball levels.

Instead of the National Basketball Association (NBA) champions, which is widely considered the most prestigious basketball league in the world, the North American spot is usually allocated to the champions of the NBA's developmental league, the G League. In place of the EuroLeague, which has long been considered Europe's most prestigious club competition, FIBA Europe sends the champions of their main club competition, the Basketball Champions League (BCL).

The champions of the Basketball Champions League Americas (BCLA), Basketball Africa League (BAL), Basketball Champions League Asia (BCL Asia) and National Basketball League (NBL) also receive a place in the tournament.

== History ==
The FIBA Intercontinental Cup competition was originally organized between the years 1966 and 1987. The tournament had its origins with a friendly test game in São Paulo, Brazil, in 1965. The test game was contested by the winners of the South American Championship of Champions Clubs, the Brazilian club S.C. Corinthians Paulista, and the FIBA European Champions Cup (now the EuroLeague) champions, the Spanish club Real Madrid. S.C. Corinthians Paulista won the test game, by a score of 118 to 109. After the success of the test tournament, the first official tournament took place in the year 1966.

In 1973, the competition adopted the name FIBA Intercontinental Cup William Jones, to honour the secretary general of FIBA, William Jones. FIBA tried to rebirth the competition in 1996, by reorganizing the Intercontinental Cup into a best-of-three playoff tournament between the winners of the Euroleague and the winners of the FIBA South American League (the champions of South America). After that tournament, however, the competition was not held until the 2013 edition.

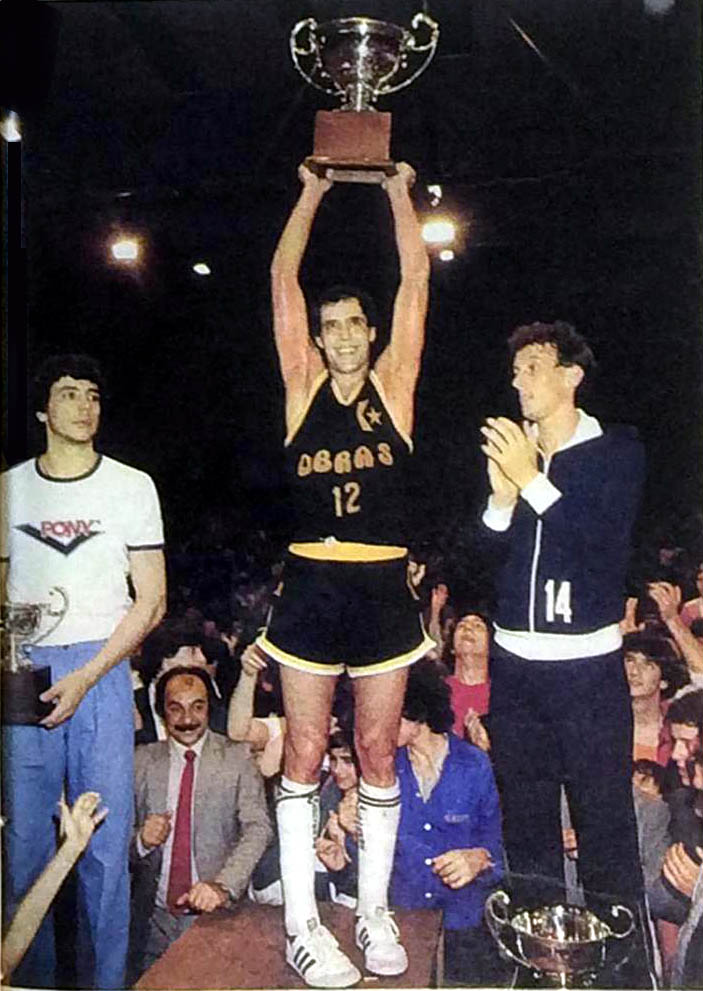
Eduardo Cadillac of Obras Sanitarias the cup in 1983, after becoming the first team from South America to win the competition.

In August 2013, an agreement reached between Euroleague Basketball Company, FIBA Americas, and FIBA World, allowed for the World Cup for Champion Clubs to be relaunched, and to be played between the Euroleague champion and the FIBA Americas League champion.

=== 1965 test tournament ===
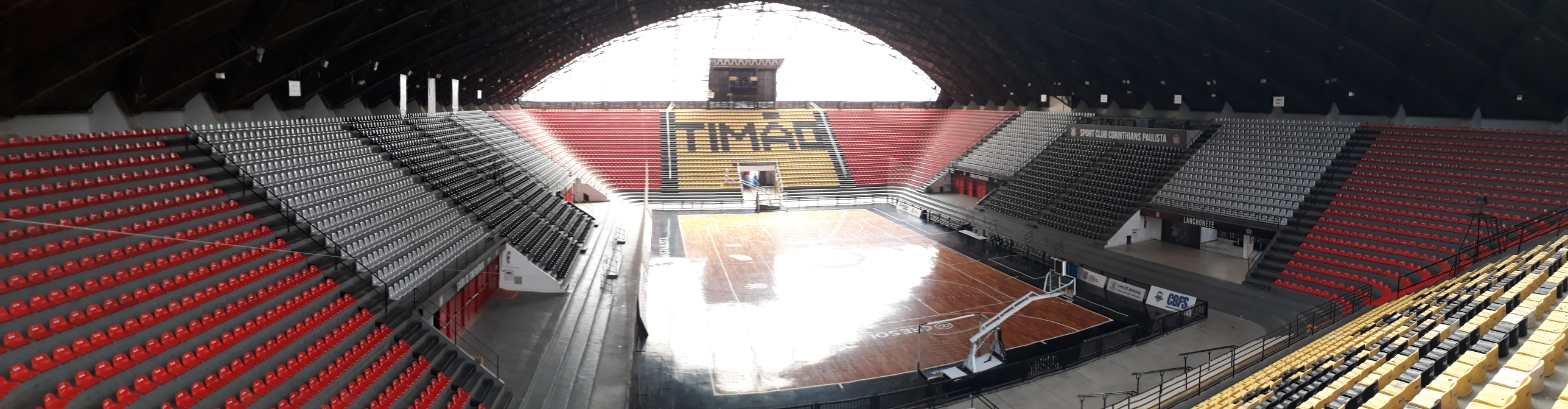
Ginásio Poliesportivo Parque São Jorge, where the 1965 FIBA Intercontinental Cup Test was held.

The FIBA Intercontinental Cup unofficially began with the friendly competition of the 1965 FIBA Intercontinental Cup Test in São Paulo, Brazil, in 1965. The game was played by the defending champions of the South American Club Championship, S.C. Corinthians Paulista, and the defending champions of the FIBA European Champions Cup (EuroLeague), Real Madrid. It was held at the Ginásio Poliesportivo Parque São Jorge. Corinthians won the game 118 to 109, with Wlamir Marques of S.C. Corinthians scoring 40 points in the game. Due to the test tournament's great success (attendance for the game was 10,000), the FIBA Intercontinental Cup was made an official annual tournament by FIBA. The first official FIBA Intercontinental Cup tournament was then held the following year.

=== 1972 special version ===
In 1972, FIBA held a 4 team tournament, featuring the Soviet Union national basketball team, the Polish national basketball team, the Brazilian national basketball team, and the NABL All-Stars Team, which participated in the place of Team USA. Although this tournament is not a part of the actual Club World Cup, it is still listed in the event's history as a special version of the tournament and counts as one of the editions, while the actual club competition was on hiatus between the years of 1970 and 1973.

=== Four team format (2016–2023) ===
In 2016, the tournament again changed format, with the EuroLeague champions no longer being allowed to compete in the tournament due to the EuroLeague's dispute with FIBA. In place of the EuroLeague champions, FIBA Europe began to send the champions of their club competition, originally the FIBA Europe Cup and later the FIBA Champions League, instead. For the 2019 tournament, FIBA increased the competition's number of teams to four, by adding the NBA G League's champions, and also a tournament host club. The tournament was also reconfigured into a final four format.

FIBA has also considered plans to expand the tournament at some point in the future, with plans to add the champion teams from the FIBA AfroLeague, the FIBA Asia Champions Cup, the Australian NBL, and possibly the NBA.

In the 2022 tournament, the league expanded to include the winner of the Basketball Africa League (BAL). From the 2023 tournament, the winners of the FIBA Asia Champions Cup will also be included in the tournament.

=== Expanded format (2023–present) ===
In March 2023, the tournament format received an overhaul. The event was changed from February to September so that it adapts more efficiently to the domestic and continental leagues' calendar and the schedule of international players, and to better accommodate participating clubs.

FIBA also signed a three-year deal partnership with Sport Singapore to hold the competition in the Singapore Sports Hub for three years in a row (until 2025). This makes it the first time in the Intercontinental Cup's history that the event will be held in Asia. Additionally, the tournament was expanded to six teams as an Asian representative was added. For the 2023 edition a team from the Chinese Basketball Association (CBA) was chosen by FIBA to participate.

The 2024 season will feature a team from Oceania for the first time, as the winners of Australia and New Zealand's National Basketball League (NBL) earn direct qualification. The Tasmania JackJumpers are the first representative in tournament history.

=== Names of the competition ===
Part of the official logo with the current competition name.

- FIBA Intercontinental Cup (or FIBA World Cup for Champion Clubs): (1966–1980)
- FIBA Club World Cup: (1981)
- FIBA Intercontinental Cup (or FIBA World Cup for Champion Clubs): (1982–1984)
- FIBA Club World Cup: (1985–1987)
- FIBA Intercontinental Cup (or FIBA World Cup for Champion Clubs): (1996, 2013–present)
  - Since 1973, the tournament has also been named in Honor of Renato William Jones, so the tournament's full official names would be either FIBA Intercontinental Cup "William Jones", or FIBA Club World Cup "William Jones".
  - The tournament is also referred to as the FIBA Intercontinental Cup of Clubs, in order to avoid confusion with the 1972 FIBA Intercontinental Cup of National Teams.

== Format ==
From the 2013 edition of the tournament through to the 2015 edition, the competition was played in either an aggregate score two-legged series, or in a single-game final format between two teams, that determined the official club world champions. Those two teams were the champions of Europe's most prestigious competition, the EuroLeague, and the champions of Latin America's premier competition, the FIBA Americas League.

For the 2016 edition and 2017 edition, the champions of the FIBA Americas League played against the champions of FIBA Europe's main club competition (now second-tier), FIBA Europe Cup (2016) and FIBA Europe's new top competition, the Basketball Champions League (2017), as EuroLeague clubs were no longer allowed to participate by FIBA due to its dispute with Euroleague Basketball.

For the 2019 edition of the tournament, FIBA expanded the competition to include the NBA G League's champions and a tournament host club. Thus, the tournament format was also changed to a final four format involving four teams.

When the competition changed from February to September, the format was also changed. Currently, six teams play in two groups of three teams. The top team of each group will go to final. Second place will go to third-place match. Third place will go to fifth place match.

== Results ==
Real Madrid from Spain holds the record for most victories, with a total of five titles.

Edition	Year	Hosts	Champions	Runners-up	Third place	Fourth place	Result(s) / Note(s)	Number of teams
–	1965 (Note: The 1965 edition of the tournament was a test edition.); Details	(Brazil); São Paulo	(Brazil); Corinthians	(Spain); Real Madrid	N/A	N/A	118–109; Unofficial test tournament	2
1	1966; Details	(Spain); Madrid	(Italy); Ignis Varese	(Brazil); Corinthians	(Spain); Real Madrid	(United States); Chicago Jamaco Saints	Final: 66–59; 3rd place game: 112–96	4
2	1967; Details	Italy (3 cities)	(United States); Akron Goodyear Wingfoots	(Italy); Ignis Varese	(Italy); Simmenthal Milano	(Brazil); Corinthians	Final: 78–72; 3rd place game: 90–89	5
3	1968; Details	(United States); Philadelphia	(United States); Akron Goodyear Wingfoots	(Spain); Real Madrid	(Italy); Simmenthal Milano	(Brazil); Botafogo	Final: 105–73; 3rd place game: 82–54	4
4	1969; Details	(United States); Macon	(United States); Akron Goodyear Wingfoots	(Czechoslovakia); Spartak ZJŠ Brno	(Brazil); Sírio	(Spain); Real Madrid	Final: 84–71; 3rd place game: 72–60	5
5	1970; Details	(Italy); Varese	(Italy); Ignis Varese	(Spain); Real Madrid	(Brazil); Corinthians	(Czechoslovakia); Slavia VŠ Praha	Five team league stage	5
6	1972 (Note: The 1972 edition of the tournament was contested by national teams rather than professional clubs.); Details	(Brazil); São Paulo	(United States); NABL All-Stars	Soviet Union	Brazil	Poland	Four team league stage	4
7	1973; Details	(Brazil); São Paulo	(Italy); Ignis Varese	(Brazil); Sírio	(Puerto Rico); Vaqueros de Bayamón	(Socialist Federal Republic of Yugoslavia); Jugoplastika	Five team league stage	5
8	1974; Details	Mexico City	(United States); Maryland Terrapins	(Italy); Ignis Varese	(Brazil); Vila Nova	(Spain); Real Madrid	Six team league stage	6
9	1975; Details	Italy (2 cities)	(Italy); Birra Forst Cantù	(Brazil); Amazonas Franca	(Spain); Real Madrid	(United States); Penn Quakers	Six team league stage	6
10	1976; Details	(Argentina); Buenos Aires	(Spain); Real Madrid	(Italy); Mobilgirgi Varese	(Argentina); Obras Sanitarias	(Brazil); Amazonas Franca	Six team league stage	6
11	1977; Details	(Spain); Madrid	(Spain); Real Madrid	(Italy); Mobilgirgi Varese	(Israel); Maccabi Elite Tel Aviv	(Brazil); Atlética Francana	Six team league stage	6
12	1978; Details	(Argentina); Buenos Aires	(Spain); Real Madrid	(Argentina); Obras Sanitarias	(Brazil); Sírio	(Italy); Mobilgirgi Varese	Five team league stage	5
13	1979; Details	(Brazil); São Paulo	(Brazil); Sírio	(Socialist Federal Republic of Yugoslavia); Bosna	(Italy); Emerson Varese	(Puerto Rico); Piratas de Quebradillas	Five team league stage	5
14	1980; Details	(Socialist Federal Republic of Yugoslavia); Sarajevo	(Israel); Maccabi Elite Tel Aviv	(Brazil); Atlética Francana	(Socialist Federal Republic of Yugoslavia); Bosna	(Spain); Real Madrid	Five team league stage	5
15	1981; Details	(Brazil); São Paulo	(Spain); Real Madrid	(Brazil); Sírio	(United States); Clemson Tigers	(Brazil); Atlética Francana	Final: 109–83; 3rd place game: 79–73	10
16	1982; Details	Netherlands (3 cities)	(Italy); Ford Cantù	(Netherlands); Nashua EBBC	(Israel); Maccabi Elite Tel Aviv	(United States); Air Force Falcons	Six team league stage	6
17	1983; Details	(Argentina); Buenos Aires	(Argentina); Obras Sanitarias	(Italy); Jollycolombani Cantù	(Uruguay); Peñarol	(Brazil); Monte Líbano	Six team league stage	6
18	1984; Details	(Brazil); São Paulo	(Italy); Banco di Roma	(Argentina); Obras Sanitarias	(Brazil); Sírio	(Spain); FC Barcelona	Five team league stage	5
19	1985; Details	Spain (2 cities)	(Spain); FC Barcelona	(Brazil); Monte Líbano	(Socialist Federal Republic of Yugoslavia); Cibona	(Argentina); San Andrés	Final: 93–89; 3rd place game: 109–82	10
20	1986; Details	Argentina (2 cities)	(Soviet Union); Žalgiris	(Argentina); Ferro Carril Oeste	(Socialist Federal Republic of Yugoslavia); Cibona	(Brazil); Corinthians	Final: 84–78; 3rd place game: 119–96	8
21	1987; Details	(Italy); Milan	(Italy); Tracer Milano	(Spain); FC Barcelona	(Socialist Federal Republic of Yugoslavia); Cibona	(Israel); Maccabi Elite Tel Aviv	Final: 100–84; 3rd place game: 106–96	8
	1988–1995		Competition inactive					
22	1996; Details (Note: In 1996, the event between the champion team of Europe and the champion of South America was initially considered as an attempt to revive the institution by FIBA with an unofficial character, however, later on it was classified by FIBA among its official events.)	Away, home and home	(Greece); Panathinaikos	(Argentina); Olimpia	N/A	N/A	2–1; 83–89 (away) / 83–78 (home) / 101–76 (home)	2
	1997–2012		Competition inactive					
23	2013; Details	Home and away	(Greece); Olympiacos	(Brazil); Pinheiros Sky	N/A	N/A	167–139; 81–70 / 86–69	2
24	2014; Details	Home and away	(Brazil); Flamengo	(Israel); Maccabi Electra Tel Aviv	N/A	N/A	156–146; 66–69 / 90–77	2
25	2015; Details	Home and away	(Spain); Real Madrid	(Brazil); Bauru	N/A	N/A	181–170; 90–91 / 91–79	2
26	2016; Details	(Germany); Frankfurt	(Venezuela); Guaros de Lara	(Germany); Fraport Skyliners	N/A	N/A	74–69	2
27	2017; Details	(Spain); Tenerife	(Spain); Iberostar Tenerife	(Venezuela); Guaros de Lara	N/A	N/A	76–71	2
28	2019; Details	(Brazil); Rio de Janeiro	(Greece); AEK	(Brazil); Flamengo	(Argentina); San Lorenzo	(United States); Austin Spurs	Final: 86–70; 3rd place game: 77–59	4
29	2020; Details	(Spain); Tenerife	(Spain); Iberostar Tenerife	(Italy); Virtus Segafredo Bologna	(Argentina); San Lorenzo	(United States); Rio Grande Valley Vipers	Final: 80–72; 3rd place game: 96–90	4
30	2021; Details	(Argentina); Buenos Aires	(Spain); San Pablo Burgos	(Argentina); Quimsa	N/A	N/A	Final: 82–73	2
31	2022; Details	(Egypt); Cairo	(Brazil); Flamengo	(Spain); San Pablo Burgos	(United States); Lakeland Magic	(Egypt); Zamalek	Final: 75–62; 3rd place game: 113–78	4
32	2023 (I); Details	(Spain); Tenerife	(Spain); Lenovo Tenerife	(Brazil); São Paulo	(United States); Rio Grande Valley Vipers	(Tunisia); US Monastir	Final: 89–67; 3rd place game: 107–84	4
33	2023 (II); Details	Singapore	(Brazil); Sesi Franca	(Germany); Telekom Baskets Bonn	(China); Zhejiang Golden Bulls	(Egypt); Al Ahly	Final: 70–69; 3rd place game: 81–74	6
34	2024; Details	Singapore	(Spain); Unicaja	(United States); NBA G League United	(Australia); Tasmania JackJumpers	(Lebanon); Al Riyadi	Final: 75–60; 3rd place game: 80–75	6
35	2025; Details	Singapore	(Spain); Unicaja	(United States); NBA G League United	(Libya); Al Ahli Tripoli	(Brazil); Flamengo	Final: 71–61; 3rd place game: 95–85	6
36	2026; Details	(China); Beijing	(United States); NBA G League United	(Lithuania); Rytas	(Argentina); Boca Juniors	(Rwanda); RSSB Tigers	Final: 89–86; 3rd place game: 93–62	6

== Statistics ==
=== Performance by club ===
Club	Titles	Runners-up	Seasons won	Seasons runner-up
(Spain) Real Madrid	5	2	1976, 1977, 1978, 1981, 2015	1968, 1970
(Italy) Varese	3	4	1966, 1970, 1973	1967, 1974, 1976, 1977
(United States) Akron Wingfoots	3	0	1967, 1968, 1969	—
(Spain) Canarias	3	0	2017, 2020, 2023 (I)	—
(Italy) Cantù	2	1	1975, 1982	1983
(Brazil) Flamengo	2	1	2014, 2022	2019
(Spain) Unicaja Málaga	2	0	2024, 2025	—
(Brazil) Sírio	1	2	1979	1973, 1981
(Argentina) Obras Sanitarias	1	2	1983	1978, 1984
(Brazil) Franca	1	2	2023 (II)	1975, 1980
(United States) NBA G League United	1	2	2026	2024, 2025
(Israel) Maccabi Tel Aviv	1	1	1980	2014
(Spain) FC Barcelona	1	1	1985	1987
(Venezuela) Guaros de Lara	1	1	2016	2017
(Spain) San Pablo Burgos	1	1	2021	2022
(United States) Maryland Terrapins	1	0	1974	—
(Italy) Virtus Roma	1	0	1984	—
(Lithuania) Žalgiris	1	0	1986	—
(Italy) Olimpia Milano	1	0	1987	—
(Greece) Panathinaikos	1	0	1996	—
(Greece) Olympiacos	1	0	2013	—
(Greece) AEK	1	0	2019	—
(Brazil) Corinthians	0	1	—	1966
(Czechoslovakia) Brno	0	1	—	1969
(Socialist Federal Republic of Yugoslavia) Bosna	0	1	—	1979
(Netherlands) EBBC	0	1	—	1982
(Brazil) Monte Líbano	0	1	—	1985
(Argentina) Ferro Carril Oeste	0	1	—	1986
(Argentina) Olimpia	0	1	—	1996
(Brazil) Pinheiros	0	1	—	2013
(Brazil) Bauru	0	1	—	2015
(Germany) Skyliners Frankfurt	0	1	—	2016
(Italy) Virtus Bologna	0	1	—	2020
(Argentina) Quimsa	0	1	—	2021
(Brazil) São Paulo	0	1	—	2023 (I)
(Germany) Baskets Bonn	0	1	—	2023 (II)
(Lithuanian Basketball Federation) Rytas	0	1	—	2026

- The 1965 test tournament and the 1972 tournament for national teams are not included.

=== Performance by country ===
Rank	Country	League(s)	Title(s)	Runner(s)-up
1	Spain	Primera División / ACB	12	4
2	Italy	LBA	7	6
3	Brazil	CBB / NBB	4	10
4	United States	NABL – 3	4	–
4	United States	NCAA Division I – 1	4	–
4	United States	NBA G League	1	2
5	Greece	GBL	3	–
6	Argentina	CAC / LNB	1	5
7	Israel	BSL	1	1
7	Venezuela	LPB	1	1
9	Soviet Union	Premier League	1	–
10	Germany	BBL	–	2
11	Czechoslovakia	CSBL	–	1
11	Netherlands	DBL	–	1
11	Yugoslavia	FFL	–	1
11	Lithuania	LKL	–	1
Total			35	35

- The 1965 test tournament and the 1972 tournament for national teams are not included.

=== Winners by confederation ===
Rank	Confederation	Winners	Runners-up
1	FIBA Europe	24	17
2	FIBA Americas	6	16
3	NABL	3	0
4	NBA	1	2
5	NCAA	1	0

=== Medals by country ===
Rank	Nation	Gold	Silver	Bronze	Total
1	Spain	12	4	2	18
2	Italy	7	6	3	16
3	United States	5	2	3	10
4	Brazil	4	10	5	19
5	Greece	3	0	0	3
6	Argentina	1	5	4	10
7	Israel	1	1	2	4
8	Venezuela	1	1	0	2
9	Soviet Union	1	0	0	1
10	Germany	0	2	0	2
11	Yugoslavia	0	1	4	5
12	Czechoslovakia	0	1	0	1
12	Lithuania	0	1	0	1
12	Netherlands	0	1	0	1
15	Australia	0	0	1	1
15	China	0	0	1	1
15	Libya	0	0	1	1
15	Puerto Rico	0	0	1	1
15	Uruguay	0	0	1	1
Totals (19 entries)		35	35	28	98

- The 1965 test tournament and the 1972 tournament for national teams are not included.

== Individual performances ==
=== Top scorers ===
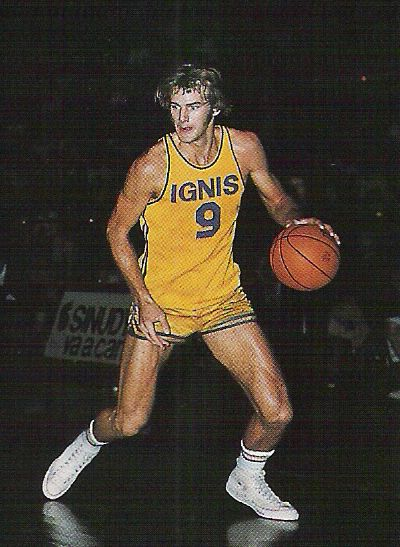
Bob Morse was the FIBA Intercontinental Cup Top Scorer in 1973 and 1976.

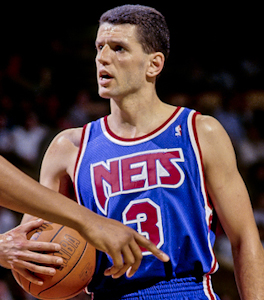
Dražen Petrović was the FIBA Intercontinental Cup Top Scorer in 1985, 1986 and 1987 with Cibona Zagreb.

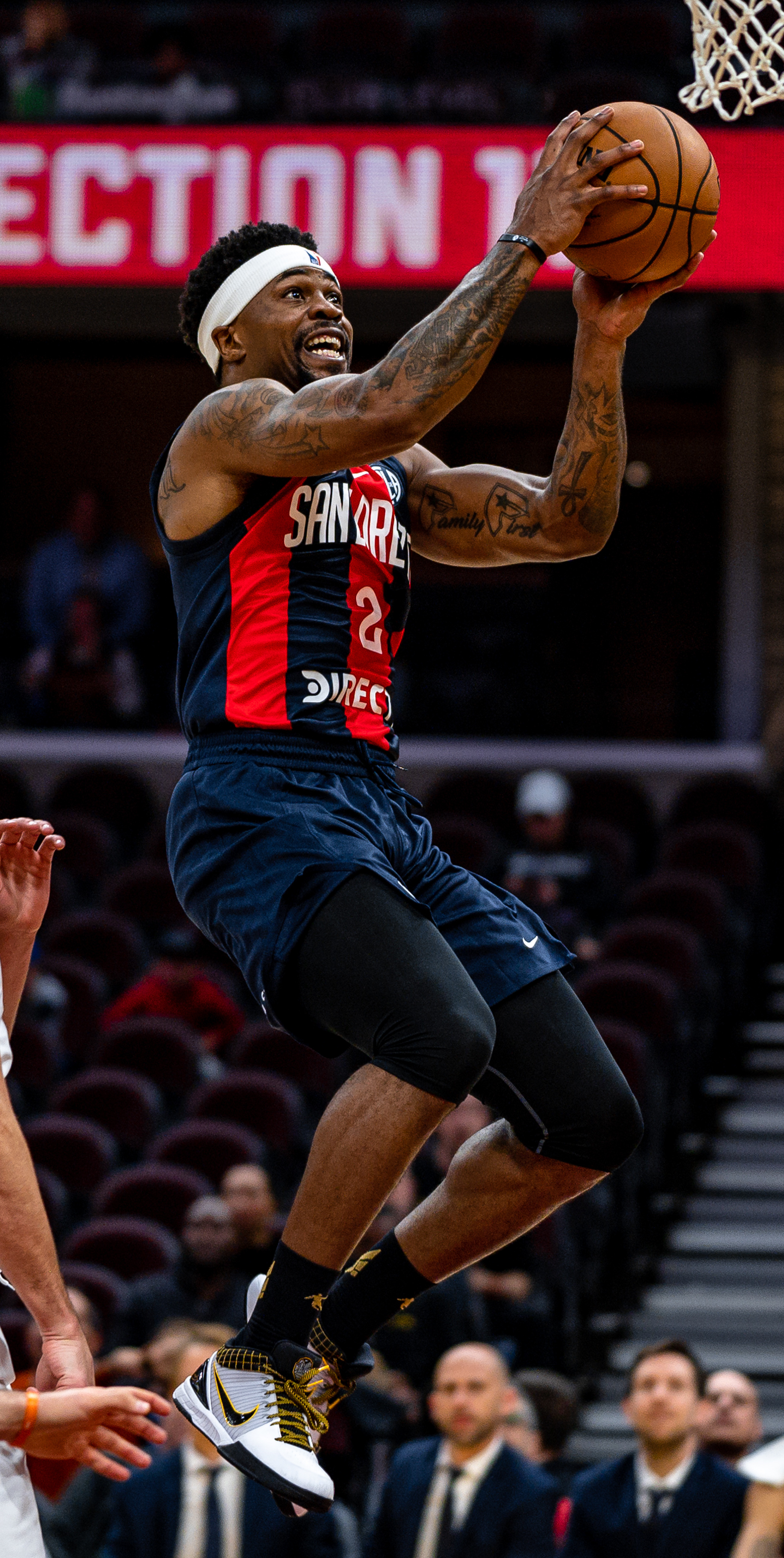
Dar Tucker was the FIBA Intercontinental Cup Top Scorer in 2019 and 2020.

Wlamir Marques holds the record for most points scored in a single game, when he scored 51 points in the 1965 test tournament. Dražen Petrović was top scorer of the tournament three times, a record. The players' nationalities in the following table are shown by national team.

Year	Name(s)	Club(s)	Points	Ref.
1965	(Brazil) Wlamir Marques	(Brazil) Corinthians	51	
1966	(Spain) Clifford Luyk	(Spain) Real Madrid	38	
1967	(United States) Steve Chubin	(Italy) Simmental Milano	79	
1968	(United States) Miles Aiken	(Spain) Real Madrid	53	
1969	(Czechoslovakia) Jan Bobrovský	(Czechoslovakia) Spartak ZJŠ Brno		
1970	(Czechoslovakia) Jiří Zídek Sr.	(Czechoslovakia) Slavia VŠ Praha	125	
1972	(Brazil) Robertão	Brazil		
1973	(United States) Bob Morse	(Italy) Ignis Varese	103	
1974	(United States) Walt Szczerbiak	(Spain) Real Madrid		
1975	(Spain) Wayne Brabender	(Spain) Real Madrid		
1976	(United States) Bob Morse	(Italy) Ignis Varese	90	
1977	(Spain) Wayne Brabender (United States) Bruce Campbell	(Spain) Real Madrid (United States) Providence Friars	141	
1978	(United States) Walt Szczerbiak	(Spain) Real Madrid	114	
1979	(Brazil) Oscar Schmidt	(Brazil) Sírio	138	
1980	(Israel) Miki Berkovich	(Israel) Maccabi Elite Tel Aviv	94	
1981	(Socialist Federal Republic of Yugoslavia) Mirza Delibašić	(Spain) Real Madrid	176	
1982	(United States) David Lawrence	(Netherlands) Nashua EBBC	92	
1983	(Italy) Antonello Riva	(Italy) Jollycolombani Cantù	158	
1984	(Spain) San Epifanio	(Spain) FC Barcelona	101	
1985	(Socialist Federal Republic of Yugoslavia) Dražen Petrović	(Socialist Federal Republic of Yugoslavia) Cibona Zagreb	141	
1986	(Socialist Federal Republic of Yugoslavia) Dražen Petrović	(Socialist Federal Republic of Yugoslavia) Cibona Zagreb	120	
1987	(Socialist Federal Republic of Yugoslavia) Dražen Petrović	(Socialist Federal Republic of Yugoslavia) Cibona Zagreb	175	
1996	(Argentina) Jorge Racca	(Argentina) Olimpia	74	
2013	(United States) Shamell Stallworth	(Brazil) Pinheiros Sky	53	
2014	(United States) Jeremy Pargo	(Israel) Maccabi Electra Tel Aviv	49	
2015	(Brazil) Rafael Hettsheimeir	(Brazil) Bauru	44	
2016	(United States) Zach Graham	(Venezuela) Guaros de Lara	19	
2017	(United States) Mario Little	(Venezuela) Guaros de Lara	23	
2019	(Jordan) Dar Tucker	(Argentina) San Lorenzo	37	
2020	(Jordan) Dar Tucker	(Argentina) San Lorenzo	38	
2021	(United States) Brandon Robinson	(Argentina) Quimsa	25	
2022	(Mexico) Luke Martínez	(Brazil) Flamengo	44	
2023 (I)	(United States) Jarrett Culver	(United States) Rio Grande Valley Vipers	45	
2023 (II)	(Brazil) Lucas Dias	(Brazil) Sesi Franca	54	
2024	(Bosnia and Herzegovina) Elmedin Kikanović	(Lebanon) Al Riyadi	50	
2025	(United States) Jaden Shackelford	(United States) NBA G League United	63	

=== MVP award ===
After each tournament, FIBA awards the Most valuable player award to the player that is deemed the most important to his team during the Intercontinental Cup. The first MVP award was given to Walt Szczerbiak Sr. of Real Madrid after he guided them to the 1977 title. The last winner is Dylan Osetkowski of Unicaja in 2024.

== Broadcasters ==
All four games are streamed through FIBA's YouTube channel for free in the USA and the unsold markets with highlights available in all territories. The tournament is also streamed for free through FIBA-DAZN's subscription streaming service Courtside 1891.

Nation(s)	Broadcaster
Africa	OSN
Belgium	DAZN
Croatia	DAZN
France	DAZN
Germany	DAZN
Hungary	DAZN
Italy	DAZN
Latin America	DAZN
Portugal	DAZN
Spain	DAZN
United States	DAZN
China	BRT
China	Migu
Czech Republic	Nova Sport
Slovakia	Nova Sport
Greece	Magenta Sport
Israel	Sport 5
Lithuania	LRT
Rwanda	RBA

== See also ==
- McDonald's Championship

== Sources ==
- History rosters 1966-87
- Sirio 1979 edition
