= 2014–15 Flamengo Basketball season =

Flamengo
2014–15 season
- Chairman: Eduardo Bandeira de Mello
- Head coach: José Alves Neto
- Arena: HSBC Arena (capacity: 15,000); Maracanãzinho (capacity: 11,800); Ginásio Álvaro Vieira Lima (capacity: 4,500)
- NBB: Champion
- FIBA Americas League: Third place
- FIBA Intercontinental Cup: Champion
Home	Away

The 2014–15 season of Flamengo Basketball is the 95th season of the club, and the club's 7th in the Novo Basquete Brasil (NBB).

Flamengo played all NBB regular season games in Ginásio Álvaro Vieira Lima.

== Off-season ==
The NBB defending champions started planning for the 2014-15 season with the signing of the former 2004 Summer Olympics gold medalist veteran Argentinian small forward Walter Herrmann, on July 24, 2014.

On August 14, 2014 NBA officially confirmed that Flamengo would be playing against Phoenix Suns, Orlando Magic and Memphis Grizzlies in the 2014-15 pre-season games. This will be the first time a South American basketball team plays against an NBA team in a pre-season game, as well as the first in North American soil.

In preparation to play 2014 FIBA Intercontinental Cup, 2015 FIBA Americas League and the 2014–15 NBB Flamengo re-signed Vítor Benite, Gegê Chaia, Olivinha, Jerome Meyinsse and one of the team stars Nicolás Laprovíttola, in order to keep the 2013-14 team base to the next season.

On September 23, 2014 the club signed former Los Angeles Lakers center Derrick Caracter, initially to be member the team's roster only for the 2014 FIBA Intercontinental Cup and the NBA pre-season tour.

== The season ==
The season started with the club winning FIBA Intercontinental Cup over Maccabi Tel Aviv, on aggregate, on a two-game series. Both games were played at HSBC Arena on September 26 and 28 and the Argentine Nicolás Laprovíttola were selected the competition MVP.

== Roster ==
Note: Flags indicate national team eligibility at FIBA-sanctioned events. Players may hold other non-FIBA nationalities not displayed.

Flamengo Basketball roster
Players
Coaches

Pos.	No.	Nat.	Name	Ht.	Wt.	Age
F	1	(Argentina)	Herrmann, Walter	2.06 m (6 ft 9 in)	102 kg (225 lb)	46 – 26 June 1979
G/F	4	(Brazil)	Machado, Marcelinho (C)	2.00 m (6 ft 7 in)	88 kg (194 lb)	50 – 12 April 1975
G	5	(Brazil)	Lorio, Danielzinho	1.80 m (5 ft 11 in)		31 – 26 May 1994
G	7	(Argentina)	Laprovíttola, Nicolás	1.86 m (6 ft 1 in)	91 kg (201 lb)	36 – 31 January 1990
G	8	(Brazil)	Benite, Vítor	1.90 m (6 ft 3 in)	88 kg (194 lb)	35 – 20 February 1990
F	9	(Brazil)	Chupeta, Luis Otávio	1.95 m (6 ft 5 in)		33 – 9 March 1992
F	10	(Brazil)	Pizzolato, Dedé (LDB)	2.00 m (6 ft 7 in)		33 – 16 April 1992
F	11	(Brazil)	Vinicius, Marcus	2.07 m (6 ft 9 in)	102 kg (225 lb)	41 – 31 May 1984
G/F	12	(Brazil)	Marques, Diego	1.91 m (6 ft 3 in)		33 – 17 March 1992
F	13	(Brazil)	Huguenin, Léo (LDB)	1.95 m (6 ft 5 in)		30 – 13 March 1995
F	16	(Brazil)	Olivinha	2.03 m (6 ft 8 in)	118 kg (260 lb)	42 – 18 April 1983
F	18	(Brazil)	Pereira, Alef (LDB)	1.85 m (6 ft 1 in)		30 – 6 March 1995
G	19	(Brazil)	Chaia, Gegê	1.88 m (6 ft 2 in)	82 kg (181 lb)	34 – 2 March 1991
C	21	(Brazil)	Felício, Cristiano	2.08 m (6 ft 10 in)	113 kg (249 lb)	33 – 7 July 1992
F/C	33	(Brazil)	Stafleu, Fernando (LDB)	2.03 m (6 ft 8 in)		31 – 10 January 1995
F/C	34	(Brazil)	Schwartzman, Luiz Otavio (LDB)	2.01 m (6 ft 7 in)		32 – 18 September 1993
G/F	35	(Brazil)	Gonçalves, Caique (LDB)	1.90 m (6 ft 3 in)		30 – 23 March 1995
F/C	40	(Brazil)	Ferreira, Gabriel Jonathan (LDB)	2.03 m (6 ft 8 in)		29 – 11 April 1996
C	55	(United States)	Meyinsse, Jerome	2.07 m (6 ft 9 in)	106 kg (234 lb)	37 – 18 December 1988

Head coach

- (Brazil) José Alves Neto

Assistant coach(es)

- (Brazil) Rodrigo Silva

Legend

- (C) Team captain
- Injured

- Roster
Updated: 2014-11-13

- (LDB) On assignment to LBD team

== Transactions ==
=== In ===
No.	Pos.	Nat.	Name	Age	Moving from		Type	Ends	Transfer fee	Date	Source
1	SF	(Argentina)	Walter Herrmann	35	Atenas de Córdoba	(Argentina)	Free agency	2015	–	1 August 2014	
45	PF	(United States)	Derrick Caracter	26	Idaho Stampede	(United States)	Free agency	2014	–	23 September 2014	

=== Out ===
No.	Pos.	Nat.	Name	Age	Moving to		Type	Transfer fee	Date	Source
20	C	(Brazil)	Douglas Santos	23	Uberlândia	(Brazil)	Free agency	–	2014	
14	SG	(United States)	Tony Washam	32	Free agent		Free agency	–	6 May 2014	
6	PF	(Brazil)	Shilton dos Santos	32	Minas Tênis Clube	(Brazil)	Free agency	–	21 July 2014	
45	PF	(United States)	Derrick Caracter	26	AEK Athens	(Greece)	Free agency	–	20 October 2014	

== Pre-season games ==
=== Friendly ===
September 20, 2014

Box Score

Flamengo	70–63	Pinheiros

Ginásio Hélio Maurício, Rio de Janeiro

=== Pre-season USA tour ===
October 8, 2014

Box Score

Phoenix Suns (United States)	100–88	(Brazil) Flamengo *
Scoring by quarter: 21–26, 33–17, 17–23, 29–20
Pts: Thomas 18; Rebs: Marc. Morris 7 Asts: Thomas 4		Pts: Marcelinho 16; Rebs: Felício 8 Asts: Laprovíttola 12

(United States) US Airways Center, Phoenix, Arizona
Attendance: 8.041

October 15, 2014

Box Score

Orlando Magic (United States)	106–88	(Brazil) Flamengo
Scoring by quarter: 34–23, 21–26, 29–23, 22–16
Pts: Vučević 20; Rebs: Vučević 11; Asts: Ridnour 5		Pts: Marcelinho 20; Rebs: Olivinha 8 Asts: Laprovíttola 9

(United States) Amway Center, Orlando, Florida
Attendance: 13.734

October 17, 2014

Box Score

Memphis Grizzlies (United States)	112–72	(Brazil) Flamengo
Scoring by quarter: 27–20, 35–21, 24–13, 24–18
Pts: Gasol 15; Rebs: Gasol, Randolph 8 Asts: Conley 7		Pts: Marcelinho 17; Rebs: Felício 7 Asts: Gegê 6

(United States) FedExForum, Memphis, Tennessee
Attendance: 10.969

* First Brazilian team to play against an NBA team on North American soil.

== Competitions ==
=== Rio de Janeiro State Championship ===
September 19, 2014

Box Score

Flamengo	96–68	Macaé Basquete

Ginásio Hélio Maurício, Rio de Janeiro

September 13, 2014

Box Score

Flamengo	102–53	Liga Super Basketball

Ginásio Hélio Maurício, Rio de Janeiro

October 22, 2014

Box Score

Macaé Basquete	69–79	Flamengo

Ginásio Tênis Clube de Macaé, Macaé

October 27, 2014

Box Score

Macaé Basquete	81–93	Flamengo

Ginásio Tênis Clube de Macaé, Macaé

October 28, 2014

Box Score

Flamengo	98–85	Macaé Basquete

Ginásio Hélio Maurício, Rio de Janeiro

=== 2014 FIBA Intercontinental Cup ===
September 26, 2014
21:30

Box Score

Flamengo (Brazil)	66–69	(Israel) Maccabi Tel Aviv
Scoring by quarter: 15–14, 20–16, 16–16, 15–23
Pts: Olivinha 13; Rebs: Caracter 11; Asts: Caracter 2		Pts: Pargo 21; Rebs: Randle 9 Asts: Pargo, Randle, Landesberg, Ohayon 2

(Brazil) HSBC Arena, Rio de Janeiro

September 28, 2014
12:00

Box Score

Flamengo (Brazil)	90–77	(Israel) Maccabi Tel Aviv
Scoring by quarter: 27–25, 19–11, 18–25, 26–16
Pts: Laprovíttola 24; Rebs: Meyinsse 6 Asts: Laprovíttola 6		Pts: Pargo 28; Rebs: Pargo 6 Asts: Pargo 7, Haynes 7

(Brazil) HSBC Arena, Rio de Janeiro

2014 FIBA Intercontinental Cup Champions

Flamengo
1st title

=== 2014-15 NBB ===
==== Regular season standings ====
Pos	Team	Pld	W	L	PF	PA	PD	Pts	Qualification or relegation
1	Bauru	30	28	2	2723	2263	+460	58	Quarterfinals Playoffs
2	Limeira	30	25	5	2483	2299	+184	55	Quarterfinals Playoffs
3	Flamengo	30	23	7	2602	2302	+300	53	Quarterfinals Playoffs
4	Mogi das Cruzes	30	21	9	2547	2447	+100	51	Quarterfinals Playoffs
5	Minas	30	17	13	2267	2228	+39	47	First Round Playoffs
6	Paulistano	30	17	13	2464	2391	+73	47	First Round Playoffs
7	Pinheiros	30	16	14	2387	2397	−10	46	First Round Playoffs
8	Franca	30	14	16	2294	2314	−20	44	First Round Playoffs
9	Palmeiras	30	13	17	2323	2378	−55	43	First Round Playoffs
10	Brasília	30	12	18	2469	2524	−55	42	First Round Playoffs
11	São José	30	12	18	2344	2433	−89	42	First Round Playoffs
12	Macaé Basquete	30	9	21	2370	2523	−153	39	First Round Playoffs
13	Uberlândia	30	9	21	2254	2471	−217	39	
14	Basquete Cearense	30	8	22	2299	2521	−222	38	
15	Rio Claro	30	8	22	2376	2535	−159	38	
16	Liga Sorocabana	30	8	22	2350	2526	−176	38	Relegation to Liga Ouro

Source: LNB – NBB

==== Regular season games ====
October 31, 2014

Box Score

Paulistano	91–99	Flamengo
Scoring by quarter: 29–18, 19–27, 25–33, 18–21
Pts: Holloway 29; Rebs: Hardin 10; Asts: Dawkins 6		Pts: Herrmann 21; Rebs: Herrmann, Meyinsse 6 Asts: Laprovíttola 7

Ginásio Antônio Prado Junior, São Paulo

November 7, 2014

Box Score

Liga Sorocabana	92–97	Flamengo
Scoring by quarter: 19–26, 26–26, 18–18, 29–27
Pts: Cauê 21; Rebs: Schneider, Thiaguinho 6 Asts: Thiaguinho 6		Pts: Marcelinho 24; Rebs: Meyinsse 8 Asts: Gegê 7

Ginásio Gualberto Moreira, Sorocaba

November 12, 2014

Box Score

Flamengo	82–79	Franca
Scoring by quarter: 20–16, 19–25, 20–19, 23–19
Pts: Marquinhos 21; Rebs: Meyinsse 6 Asts: Marcelinho 4		Pts: Meindl 17; Rebs: Meindl 8 Asts: Figueroa 4

Ginásio Álvaro Vieira Lima, Rio de Janeiro

November 18, 2014

Box Score

Minas Tênis Clube	78–76	Flamengo
Scoring by quarter: 17–14, 18–19, 19–20, 24–23
Pts: Alex 22; Rebs: Ansaloni 13; Asts: Collum 7		Pts: Herrmann 18; Rebs: Herrmann 8 Asts: Laprovíttola 6

Arena VIVO, Belo Horizonte

November 20, 2014

Box Score

Uberlândia	101–98	Flamengo
Scoring by quarter: 29–23, 17–31, 29–20, 26–24
Pts: Audrei 21; Rebs: Brown, Taboada, Renan, Silva 4 Asts: Brown, Taboada, Renan, Mims 4		Pts: Herrmann 20; Rebs: Meyinsse 11; Asts: Laprovíttola, Machado, Olivinha 3

Ginásio Homero Santos, Uberlândia

November 25, 2014

Box Score

Flamengo	0–20	Pinheiros

Ginásio Álvaro Vieira Lima, Rio de Janeiro

November 27, 2014

Box Score

Flamengo	81–79	Palmeiras
Scoring by quarter: 14–17, 19–18, 31–22, 17–20
Pts: Marquinhos 16; Rebs: Marquinhos, Meyinsse 7 Asts: Laprovíttola 6		Pts: Jhonatan 19; Rebs: Nunes, Toyloy 7 Asts: Stanic 7

Ginásio Álvaro Vieira Lima, Rio de Janeiro

December 10, 2014

Box Score

Mogi das Cruzes	94–98	Flamengo
Scoring by quarter: 28–18, 22–28, 16–18, 28–34
Pts: Stallworth 28; Rebs: Curnell 8 Asts: Elinho 5		Pts: Marquinhos 25; Rebs: Laprovíttola, Meyinsse 4 Asts: Laprovíttola 11

Ginásio Municipal Hugo Ramos, Mogi das Cruzes

December 12, 2014

Box Score

São José	71–94	Flamengo
Scoring by quarter: 17–18, 18–30, 25–20, 11–26
Pts: Baxter 19; Rebs: Drudi 7 Asts: Dedé 4		Pts: Benite 24; Rebs: Meyinsse 7 Asts: Gegê, Olivinha 4

Ginásio Lineu de Moura, São José dos Campos

December 16, 2014

Box Score

Flamengo	76–74	Brasília
Scoring by quarter: 19–21, 19–14, 20–17, 18–22
Pts: Machado 17; Rebs: Felício 10; Asts: Marquinhos 4		Pts: Fred 17; Rebs: Ronald 7 Asts: Fred, Giovanonni 4

Ginásio Álvaro Vieira Lima, Rio de Janeiro

December 18, 2014

Box Score

Flamengo	106–73	Basquete Cearense
Scoring by quarter: 29–21, 19–20, 31–16, 27–16
Pts: Marquinhos 21; Rebs: Felício, Meyinsse 7 Asts: Gegê 9		Pts: Rossetto, Andrezão 15; Rebs: Paranhos 4 Asts: Rossetto 3

Ginásio Tênis Clube de Macaé, Macaé

December 22, 2014

Box Score

Macaé Basquete	86–84	Flamengo
Scoring by quarter: 16–20, 13–23, 25–20, 32–21
Pts: Smith 26; Rebs: George 9 Asts: Márcio 5		Pts: Machado 19; Rebs: Marquinhos 6 Asts: Laprovíttola 8

Ginásio Tênis Clube de Macaé, Macaé

January 7, 2015

Box Score

Rio Claro	85–93	Flamengo
Scoring by quarter: 18–21, 13–27, 28–19, 26–26
Pts: Tischer 18; Rebs: Tischer 6 Asts: Brown 6		Pts: Meyinsse 15; Rebs: Marquinhos, Olivinha 7 Asts: Laprovíttola, Machado 3

Ginásio Felipe Karam, Rio Claro

January 9, 2015

Box Score

Limeira	78–73	Flamengo
Scoring by quarter: 20–16, 24–19, 18–19, 16–19
Pts: Nezinho 23; Rebs: Fiorotto 9 Asts: Nezinho, Fiorotto 5		Pts: Marquinhos 23; Rebs: Herrmann 9 Asts: Laprovíttola 6

Ginásio "Vô" Lucato, Limeira

January 13, 2014

Box Score

Flamengo	77–84	Bauru
Scoring by quarter: 18–25, 18–21, 22–19, 19–19
Pts: Marquinhos 18; Rebs: Marquinhos, Machado 8 Asts: Laprovíttola 6		Pts: Garcia 19; Rebs: Garcia 10; Asts: Jefferson 3

HSBC Arena, Rio de Janeiro

==== (3) Flamengo vs. (11) São José ====
Game 1

April 23, 2015
18:00 UTC−03:00

Report

Flamengo 85, São José 62
Scoring by quarter: 28–15, 19–18, 20–18, 18–11
Pts: Benite 19; Rebs: Olivinha 13; Asts: Laprovíttola 4	Pts: Baxter 15; Rebs: Torres 8 Asts: Valtinho 4

Ginásio Álvaro Vieira Lima, Rio de Janeiro, Rio de Janeiro
Attendance: 934
Referees: Cristiano Maranho, Fabiano Huber, Maria Cláudia Moraes

Game 2

April 25, 2015
18:00 UTC−03:00

Report

Flamengo 76, São José 82
Scoring by quarter: 21–20, 14–21, 22–16, 19–25
Pts: Marquinhos 22; Rebs: Olivinha 6 Asts: Laprovíttola 5	Pts: Laws 17; Rebs: three players 7 Asts: Betinho 6

Ginásio Álvaro Vieira Lima, Rio de Janeiro, Rio de Janeiro
Attendance: 1,617
Referees: Guilherme Locatelli, Marcos Ferreira, Leandro Sehnem

Game 3

April 28, 2015
20:00 UTC−03:00

Report

São José 68, Flamengo 86
Scoring by quarter: 18–25, 11–22, 22–20, 17–19
Pts: Dedé 14; Rebs: Torres 10; Asts: Torres, Valtinho 4	Pts: Olivinha 21; Rebs: Marquinhos 7 Asts: Laprovíttola 6

Ginásio Lineu de Moura, São José dos Campos, São Paulo
Attendance: 1,570
Referees: José Pelissari, Marcos Benito, Diego Chiconato

Game 4

April 30, 2015
19:30 UTC−03:00

Report

São José 81, Flamengo 76
Scoring by quarter: 28–23, 17–17, 22–19, 14–17
Pts: Baxter 21; Rebs: Torres 11; Asts: Valtinho 8	Pts: Marquinhos 26; Rebs: Laprovíttola 6 Asts: Laprovíttola 6

Ginásio Lineu de Moura, São José dos Campos, São Paulo
Attendance: 1,520
Referees: Fernando Serpa, Jacob Barreto, Andreia Silva

Game 5

May 5, 2015
21:00 UTC−03:00

Report

Flamengo 98, São José 64
Scoring by quarter: 21–18, 22–17, 29–10, 26–19
Pts: Marquinhos 26; Rebs: Meyinsse 10; Asts: Laprovíttola 9	Pts: Torres 16; Rebs: Torres, Renan 6 Asts: Valtinho 5
Flamengo wins series, 3–2

Ginásio Álvaro Vieira Lima, Rio de Janeiro, Rio de Janeiro
Attendance: 1,877
Referees: Fernando Serpa, Guilherme Locatelli, Diego Chiconato

==== (2) Limeira vs. (3) Flamengo ====
Game 1

May 9, 2015
16:00 UTC−03:00

Report

Limeira 78, Flamengo 85
Scoring by quarter: 20–14, 21–24, 18–18, 19–29
Pts: Jackson 19; Rebs: Jackson, Fiorotto 5 Asts: Nezinho 7	Pts: Laprovíttola 21; Rebs: Olivinha, Marquinhos 6 Asts: Laprovíttola 6

Ginásio Vô Lucato, Limeira, São Paulo
Attendance: 1,431
Referees: Guilherme Locatelli, Diego Chiconato, Fabiano Huber

Game 2

May 11, 2015
19:00 UTC−03:00

Report

Limeira 73, Flamengo 92
Scoring by quarter: 15–27, 21–16, 13–17, 24–32
Pts: Teichmann, Deryk 13; Rebs: Teichmann 6 Asts: Mineiro 5	Pts: Marquinhos 25; Rebs: Marquinhos 5 Asts: Laprovíttola 6

Ginásio Vô Lucato, Limeira, São Paulo
Attendance: 1,168
Referees: Fernando Serpa, Marcos Ferreira, Leandro Sehnem

Game 3

May 14, 2015
20:30 UTC−03:00

Report

Flamengo 76, Limeira 67
Scoring by quarter: 21–21, 14–19, 19–20, 22–7
Pts: Meyinsse 17; Rebs: Olivinha 8 Asts: Laprovíttola 7	Pts: Jackson 15; Rebs: Mineiro 8 Asts: Ramón 4
Flamengo wins series, 3–0

Ginásio Álvaro Vieira Lima, Rio de Janeiro, Rio de Janeiro
Attendance: 1,971
Referees: Cristiano Maranho, Jacob Barreto, Maurício Serour

==== (1) Bauru vs. (3) Flamengo ====
Game 1

May 26, 2015
21:30 UTC−03:00

Report

Flamengo 91, Bauru 69
Scoring by quarter: 28–18, 19–10, 23–15, 21–26
Pts: Benite 16; Rebs: Felício 8 Asts: Laprovíttola 7	Pts: Fischer 20; Rebs: Garcia, Murilo 5 Asts: Fischer 8

HSBC Arena, Rio de Janeiro, Rio de Janeiro
Attendance: 5,616
Referees: Fernando Serpa, Guilherme Locatelli, Diego Chiconato

Game 2

May 30, 2015
10:00 UTC−03:00

Report

Bauru 67, Flamengo 77
Scoring by quarter: 11–25, 14–15, 14–22, 28–15
Pts: Day 23; Rebs: Garcia 8 Asts: Taylor 6	Pts: Laprovíttola 19; Rebs: Olivinha, Meyinsse 8 Asts: Laprovíttola 4
Flamengo wins series, 2–0

Ginásio Municipal Neusa Galetti, Marília, São Paulo
Referees: Cristiano Maranho, Jacob Barreto, Fabiano Huber

=== FIBA Americas League ===
==== Group B ====
Pos	Team	Pld	W	L	PF	PA	PD	Pts	Qualification
1	(Brazil) Flamengo	3	2	1	288	237	+51	5	Advance to Quarterfinals
2	(Mexico) Pioneros de Quintana Roo	3	2	1	264	238	+26	5	Advance to Quarterfinals
3	(Uruguay) Malvín	3	2	1	240	249	−9	5	
4	(Chile) Leones de Quilpué	3	0	3	243	311	−68	3	

Source: fibaamericas.com

23 January 2015
18:15

Boxscore

Malvín (Uruguay)	74–97	(Brazil) Flamengo
Scoring by quarter: 19-24, 12-20, 22-31, 21-22
Pts: Winston 21; Rebs: Asselin 7 Asts: Mazzarino 4		Pts: Laprovittola 25; Rebs: Felício 10; Asts: Laprovittola 10

Polifórum Benito Juárez, Cancún (MEX)

24 January 2015
18:15

Boxscore

Flamengo (Brazil)	110–77	(Chile) Leones de Quilpué
Scoring by quarter: 28-18, 20-23, 30-17, 32-19
Pts: Herrmann 26; Rebs: Olivinha 12; Asts: Laprovittola 9		Pts: Nelson 18; Rebs: Nelson, Washington 6 Asts: Nelson 2

Polifórum Benito Juárez, Cancún (MEX)

25 January 2015
20:30

Boxscore

Pioneros de Quintana Roo (Mexico)	86–81	(Brazil) Flamengo
Scoring by quarter: 17-31, 30-23, 23-9, 16-18
Pts: Keenan 22; Rebs: Soriano 10; Asts: Clemente 6		Pts: Herrmann 26; Rebs: Olivinha 10; Asts: Laprovittola 12

Polifórum Benito Juárez, Cancún (MEX)

==== Group F ====
Pos	Team	Pld	W	L	PF	PA	PD	Pts	Qualification
1	(Brazil) Flamengo	3	3	0	285	218	+67	6	Advance to Final Four
2	(Argentina) Peñarol de Mar del Plata	3	2	1	242	215	+27	5	Advance to Final Four
3	(Mexico) Halcones Rojos	3	1	2	209	242	−33	4	
4	(Venezuela) Trotamundos	3	0	3	201	262	−61	3	

Source: fibaamericas.com

27 February 2015
19:00

Boxscore

Flamengo (Brazil)	92–62	(Mexico) Halcones Rojos
Scoring by quarter: 17-12, 19-18, 31-18, 25-14
Pts: Marquinhos 19; Rebs: Olivinha 10; Asts: Marquinhos 5		Pts: Ebanks 20; Rebs: 3 players 5 Asts: Ebanks, Holloway 2

Polideportivo Islas Malvinas, Mar del Plata (ARG)

28 February 2015
19:00

Boxscore

Trotamundos (Venezuela)	70–105	(Brazil) Flamengo
Scoring by quarter: 27-29, 6-18, 19-33, 18-25
Pts: Matthews 14; Rebs: Matthews, Martinez 6 Asts: D.Cubillan, Aguilera 2		Pts: Herrmann 22; Rebs: Felício 13; Asts: Laprovittola 9

Polideportivo Islas Malvinas, Mar del Plata (ARG)

1 March 2015
20:30

Boxscore

Peñarol de Mar del Plata (Argentina)	86–88	(Brazil) Flamengo
Scoring by quarter: 17-22, 13-23, 22-24, 34-19
Pts: Gutierrez 20; Rebs: Leiva, Boccia 5 Asts: Konsztadt 6		Pts: Laprovittola 18; Rebs: Olivinha 9 Asts: Laprovittola 3

Polideportivo Islas Malvinas, Mar del Plata (ARG)

==== Semifinals ====
March 14, 2015
20:15

Boxscore

Flamengo (Brazil)	80–81 (OT)	(Mexico) Pioneros de Quintana Roo
Scoring by quarter: 23–14, 19–26, 16–20, 16–14, Overtime: 7–8
Pts: Marquinhos 27; Rebs: Meyinsse 7 Asts: Marquinhos 27		Pts: Keenan 25; Rebs: Hernández 12; Asts: Manjarres 5

Rio de Janeiro

==== Bronze medal game ====
March 15, 2015
18:00

Boxscore

Peñarol de Mar del Plata (Argentina)	81–97	(Brazil) Flamengo
Scoring by quarter: 23-31, 20-19, 14-24, 24–23
Pts: Massarelli, Leiva 15; Rebs: Leiva 7 Asts: Massarelli 4		Pts: Laprovittola, Benite 24; Rebs: Felício 9 Asts: Laprovittola 9

Rio de Janeiro

=== Season records ===
Competition	Regular season				Playoffs				Totals			
Competition	G	W	L	PCT	G	W	L	PCT	G	W	L	PCT
NBB	40	23	7	.767	10	8	2	.800	40	31	9	.775
FIBA Americas League	6	5	1	.833	2	1	1	.500	8	6	2	.750
Totals	46	28	8	.778	12	9	3	.750	48	37	11	.771

== Player statistics ==
=== NBB regular season ===
#	Player	GP	GS	MPG	2FG%	3FG%	FT%	RPG	APG	SPG	BPG	TO	PPG	EFF
1	(Argentina) Walter Herrmann	29	-	25.1	.492	.407	.836	4.9	.9	.5	.0	.9	11.1	11.5
4	(Brazil) Marcelinho Machado	25	-	23.1	.418	.398	.778	2.0	2.2	.6	.1	1.2	11.4	9.2
5	(Brazil) Danielzinho Lorio	9	-	1.7	.000	.250	.000	.0	.3	.0	.0	.0	.3	.3
7	(Argentina) Nicolás Laprovíttola	29	-	27.2	.551	.457	.791	3.0	5.6	1.2	.0	3.2	11.6	14.3
8	(Brazil) Vítor Benite	28	-	22.4	.521	.411	.840	2.1	1.4	.6	.0	1.3	11.7	10.6
9	(Brazil) Luís Otávio Chupeta	7	-	3.4	.167	.500	.167	1.0	.0	.3	.0	.0	1.7	1.1
11	(Brazil) Marquinhos Vieira	28	-	27.8	.539	.459	.821	4.5	2.6	.9	.2	2.0	16.3	16.3
12	(Brazil) Diego Marques	0	-	0.0	.000	.000	.000	.0	.0	.0	.0	.0	.0	.0
13	(Brazil) Léo Huguenin	1	-	0.5	.000	.000	.000	.0	.0	.0	.0	.0	.0	.0
16	(Brazil) Carlos Olivinha	29	-	22.6	.622	.349	.703	6.1	1.1	.9	.2	1.0	10.2	13.4
19	(Brazil) Gegê Chaia	26	-	16.7	.357	.304	.750	1.1	3.3	.7	.0	1.1	3.2	5.0
21	(Brazil) Cristiano Felício	29	-	14.7	.644	.000	.717	4.6	.9	.3	.3	.9	5.6	9.1
55	(United States) Jerome Meyinsse	29	-	25.5	.617	.500	.674	5.5	.8	.9	1.1	1.8	11.2	14.0

Updated: August 10, 2016

== Notes ==
On October 1, 2014 Flamengo announced the project to build a multisport arena in the Gávea neighborhood in a partnership with fast food chain McDonald's. The venue will have a capacity up to 4,000 people for basketball, volleyball and futsal events and music shows.
