= Rexhepi =

- Language: Albanian

Origin
- Language: Arabic via Turkish
- Origin: Arabic
- Derivation: Rexhep

Other names
- Variant forms: Redžepi, Redzepi

Rexhepi is an Albanian surname, originally a patronymic for the given name Rexhep, an older Albanian spelling for "Rajab" via Turkish "Recep". The current spelling is Rexheb. The digraph xh in Albanian orthography denotes the sound [dʒ], similar to how the initial j is pronounced in the English word jump. The name has been re-spelled as Redzepi outside Albania.

People with that surname include:

- Arbresha Rexhepi (born 2000), Macedonian judoka
- Ardian Rexhepi (born 1993), Swedish football player
- Arsim Rexhepi (born 1972), Kosovan politician
- Bajram Rexhepi (1954–2017), Interior Minister of the Republic of Kosovo
- Dardan Rexhepi (born 1992), Swedish football player
- Davide Redzepi (born 1988), Swiss football player
- Emilija Redžepi (born 1973), Kosovan politician
- Haris Redžepi (born 1988), Bosnian football player
- Klaudio Rexhepi (born 1989), Albanian footballer
- Lavdrim Rexhepi (born 1998), Swiss footballer
- Lum Rexhepi (born 1992), Finnish football player
- Perlat Rexhepi (1919–1942), Albanian anti-fascist student, one of the Three Heroes of Shkodër
- René Redzepi (born 1977), award-winning Danish chef
- Rexhep Rexhepi (died 1999), former player and captain of Kosovar football club KF Feronikeli after whom its Rexhep Rexhepi Stadium has been named
- Rexhep Rexhepi (born 1987), award-winning watchmaker, Kosovar émigré to Switzerland
- Šakir Redžepi (born 1987), Macedonian football player
- Sulejman Rexhepi, former leader of the Islamic Religious Community of Macedonia
- Xhemail Rexhepi (died 2015), commander of the National Liberation Army
- Xhengis Rexhepi (born 1982), Macedonian coach
