= Rajab (disambiguation) =

Rajab is the seventh month of the Islamic calendar, Rajab may also refer to:

== Places ==
- Naqsh-e Rajab, archaeological site in Iran
- Rajab, Jalandhar, village in India
- Rajab, village in Jordan

== People ==
- Rajab (name), an Arabic given name
