= Recep =

Recep is a Turkish name deriving from the Arabic name Rajab. It may refer to:

== People ==
=== Surname ===
- Sibel Recep (born 1987), Swedish pop singer

=== Given name ===
- Recep Adanır (1929–2017), Turkish footballer
- Recep Akdağ (born 1960), Turkish physician and politician
- Recep Altepe (born 1959), Turkish politician
- Recep Ankaralı (born 1968), Turkish basketball referee
- Recep Aydın (born 1990), Turkish footballer
- Recep Biler (born 1981), Turkish footballer
- Recep Bülent Bostanoğlu (born 1953), Turkish admiral
- Recep Burak Yılmaz (born 1995), Turkish footballer
- Recep Çelik (born 1983), Turkish racewalker
- Recep Çetin (born 1965), retired Turkish footballer
- Recep Çiftçi (born 1995), Turkish paralympic judoka
- Recep Gül (born 2000), Turkish footballer
- Recep Gürkan (born 1964), Turkish politician
- Recep Küpçü (1934–1976), Bulgarian poet and writer
- Recep Niyaz (born 1995), Turkish footballer
- Recep Öztürk (born 1977), Turkish footballer
- Recep Pasha (died 1726), Ottoman statesman and governor
- Recep Peker (1889–1950), Turkish politician
- Recep Şentürk (born 1964), Turkish academic and sociologist
- Recep Tayyip Erdoğan (born 1954), Prime Minister of Turkey (2003–2014) and President of Turkey (2014–present)
- Recep Topal (born 1992), Turkishw wrestler
- Recep Uçar (born 1975), Turkish footballer and manager
- Recep Ünalan (born 1990), Turkish cyclist
- Recep Uslu (born 1958), Turkish writer
- Recep Yemişçi (born 1999), Turkish footballer
- Recep Yıldız (born 1986), Turkish footballer

=== Middle name ===
- Matlı Recep Paşa (1842–1908), Albanian Ottoman marshal, governor and statesman
- Münir Recep Aktaş (born 1989), Turkish wrestler
- Onur Recep Kivrak (born 1988), Turkish footballer
- Topal Recep Pasha (died 1632), Bosnian Ottoman statesman and grand vizier

== Other uses ==
- Recep's chub (Alburnoides recepi), a freshwater fish
- Recep, Çermik, village in Diyarbakir Province, Turkey
- Recep, Çelikhan, village in Adiyaman Province, Turkey

== See also ==
- Rexhep
- Rajab
