= HSBC Arena =

HSBC Arena may refer to:

- Jeunesse Arena in Rio de Janeiro, known as HSBC Arena from 2008 to 2017
- KeyBank Center in Buffalo, New York, known as HSBC Arena from 2000 to 2011
