= Cristiano Felício =

Brazilian basketball player (born 1992)

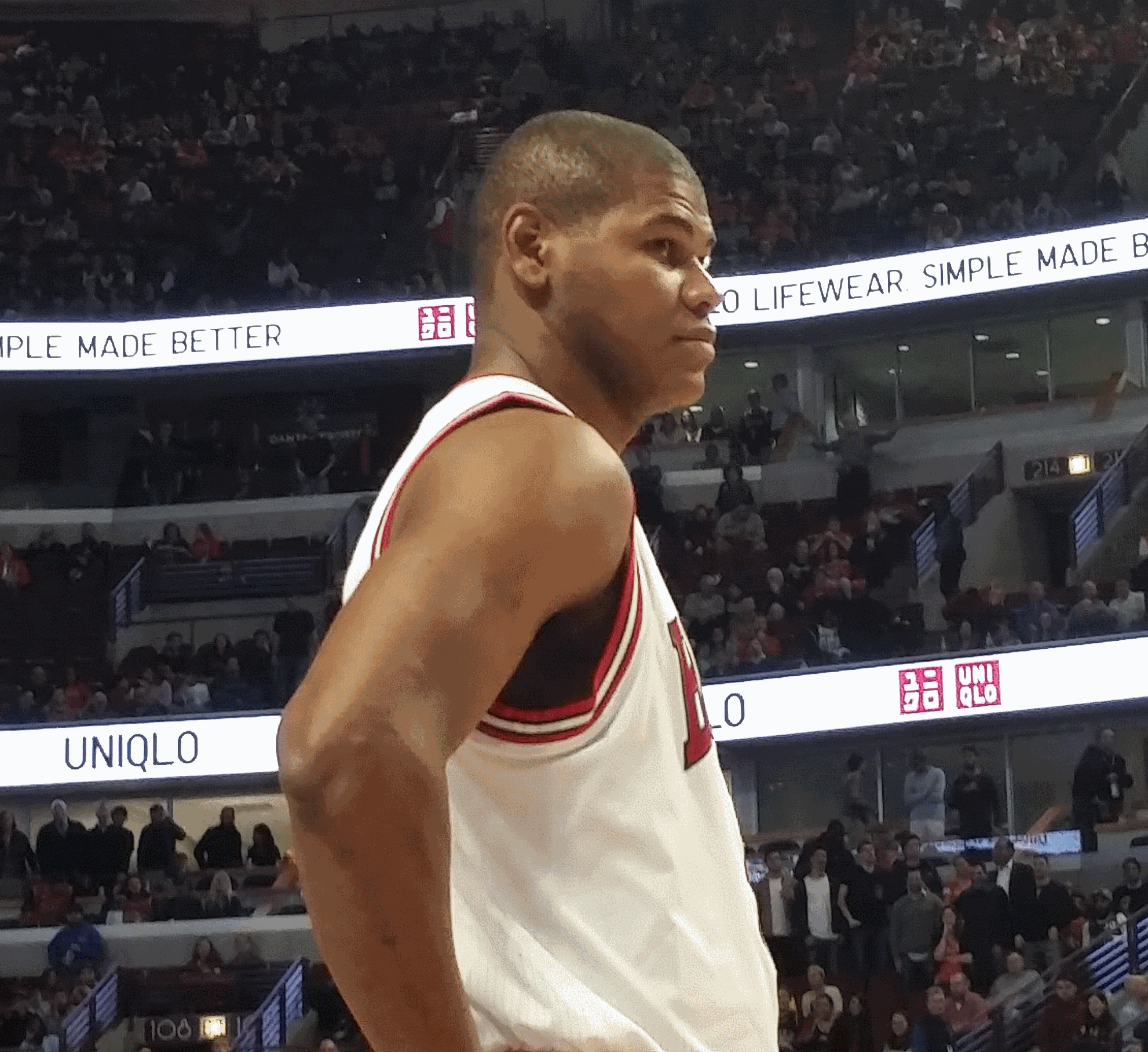
- Felício with the Chicago Bulls in 2016

No. 6 – Sendai 89ers
- Position: Center / power forward
- League: B.League

Personal information
- Born: July 7, 1992 (age 34) Pouso Alegre, Brazil
- Listed height: 6 ft 11 in (2.11 m)
- Listed weight: 271 lb (123 kg)

Career information
- High school: CCSE Prep Academy (Sacramento, California)
- NBA draft: 2014: undrafted
- Playing career: 2009–present

Career history
- 2009–2012: Minas Tênis Clube
- 2013–2015: Flamengo
- 2015–2021: Chicago Bulls
- 2015–2016: →Canton Charge
- 2016, 2019–2020: →Windy City Bulls
- 2021–2022: ratiopharm Ulm
- 2022–2024: Covirán Granada
- 2024–present: Sendai 89ers

Career highlights
- FIBA Intercontinental Cup champion (2014); FIBA Americas League champion (2014); 3× Brazilian League champion (2013–2015); BBL rebounding leader (2022)
- Stats at NBA.com
- Stats at Basketball Reference
Medals
Men's basketball
Representing Brazil
FIBA AmeriCup
Silver medal – second place	2022 Brazil
FIBA South American Championship
Bronze medal – third place	2014 Venezuela

Cristiano Silva Felício (born July 7, 1992) is a Brazilian professional basketball player for Sendai 89ers of the B.League. He previously played in his home country of Brazil for Minas Tênis Clube and Flamengo, in the National Basketball Association for the Chicago Bulls, and in Germany for ratiopharm Ulm.

== Professional career ==
=== Minas Tênis Clube (2009–2012) ===
After playing professionally in Brazil for Minas Tênis Clube between 2009 and 2012, Felício moved to Sacramento, California to attend CCSE Prep Academy in 2012–13 before attempting to gain NCAA eligibility to attend the University of Oregon in 2013–14.

=== Flamengo (2013–2015) ===
Felicio was later deemed ineligible to play college basketball and returned to Brazil, where he played a further two seasons for Flamengo, winning both the 2014 FIBA Americas League and FIBA Intercontinental Cup.

=== Chicago Bulls (2015–2021) ===
After joining the Chicago Bulls for the 2015 NBA Summer League, Felício signed with the team on July 12, 2015. On December 31, 2015, using the flexible assignment rule, he was assigned to the Canton Charge, the D-League affiliate of the Cleveland Cavaliers. He was recalled by the Bulls on January 13, reassigned to Canton on January 15, and recalled again on January 16. On March 17, he recorded six points and a season-high 10 rebounds in a 118–102 win over the Brooklyn Nets. Two days later, he made his first career start, replacing the injured Pau Gasol in the Bulls' 92–85 win over the Utah Jazz. On April 9, he had a season-best game in the Bulls' 105–102 win over the Cleveland Cavaliers. Felício was 7-for-7 from the field, scored 16 points, grabbed five rebounds, blocked two shots and dished out an assist in 23 minutes. Two days later, he scored 16 points for the second straight game, helping the Bulls defeat the New Orleans Pelicans 121–116.

On November 26, 2016, Felício was assigned to Chicago's new D-League affiliate, the Windy City Bulls. He was recalled the next day. On December 30, 2016, he grabbed a season-high 12 rebounds in a 111–101 loss to the Indiana Pacers. On January 12, 2017, he scored a season-high 13 points in a 104–89 loss to the New York Knicks.

On July 6, 2017, Felício re-signed with the Bulls. On March 19, 2018, he scored a career-high 17 points in a 110–92 loss to the New York Knicks.

=== ratiopharm Ulm (2021–2022) ===
On August 9, 2021, Felicio signed with ratiopharm Ulm of the Basketball Bundesliga.

=== Granada (2022–present) ===
For the 2022–23 season, Felicio signed with Covirán Granada of the Spanish Liga ACB.

== National team career ==
Felício has been a member of the senior Brazilian national basketball team. With Brazil, he has played at the following major tournaments: the 2012 FIBA South American Championship, the 2013 FIBA AmeriCup, the 2014 FIBA South American Championship, and the 2016 Rio Olympics. He won the bronze medal at the 2014 FIBA South American Championship.

== NBA career statistics ==
Legend
GP	Games played	GS	Games started	MPG	Minutes per game
FG%	Field goal percentage	3P%	3-point field goal percentage	FT%	Free throw percentage
RPG	Rebounds per game	APG	Assists per game	SPG	Steals per game
BPG	Blocks per game	PPG	Points per game	**Bold**	Career high

=== Regular season ===
Year	Team	GP	GS	MPG	FG%	3P%	FT%	RPG	APG	SPG	BPG	PPG
2015–16	Chicago	31	4	10.4	.556	.000	.714	3.3	.8	.2	**.4**	3.4
2016–17	Chicago	**66**	0	15.8	.579	–	.645	**4.7**	.6	.4	.3	4.8
2017–18	Chicago	55	**16**	**17.8**	.591	.000	.667	4.2	**1.0**	.3	.2	**5.6**
2018–19	Chicago	60	0	12.4	.531	.000	.685	3.6	.6	.2	.1	4.0
2019–20	Chicago	22	0	17.5	**.630**	.000	**.783**	4.6	.7	**.5**	.1	3.9
2020–21	Chicago	18	0	4.7	.538	.000	.563	1.4	.5	.2	.0	1.3
Career		252	20	14.1	.572	.000	.673	3.9	.7	.3	.2	4.3

=== Playoffs ===
Year	Team	GP	GS	MPG	FG%	3P%	FT%	RPG	APG	SPG	BPG	PPG
2017	Chicago	6	0	13.7	.600	.000	.500	4.3	.3	.5	.3	3.2
Career		6	0	13.7	.600	.000	.500	4.3	.3	.5	.3	3.2
