= 2014 FIBA Intercontinental Cup =

Flamengo	Maccabi Electra
(Brazil)	(Israel)
156	146

First leg
Flamengo	Maccabi Electra
66	69
- Date: September 26, 2014
- Venue: HSBC Arena, Rio de Janeiro
- MVP: (Argentina) Nicolás Laprovíttola

Second leg
Maccabi Electra	Flamengo
77	90
- Date: September 28, 2014
- Venue: HSBC Arena, Rio de Janeiro

The 2014 FIBA Intercontinental Cup was the 24th edition of the FIBA Intercontinental Cup for men's professional basketball clubs and the 23rd edition of the tournament being in the form of a true intercontinental tournament for clubs. The 2 game aggregate score tournament took place at the HSBC Arena in Rio de Janeiro, Brazil, on September 26 and September 28, 2014, in order to determine the world club champion. The tournament was contested between the 2013–14 season EuroLeague champions, Maccabi Electra, and the 2014 FIBA Americas League champions, Flamengo.

== Series summary ==
Game	Date	Home team	Result	Road team
Game 1	September 26	Flamengo	66–69	Maccabi Electra
Game 2	September 28	Flamengo	90–77	Maccabi Electra

Flamengo won the series by aggregate score 156-146.

=== Game 1 ===
September 26
21:30

Box Score

Flamengo (Brazil)	66–69	(Israel) Maccabi Electra
Scoring by quarter: 15–14, 20–16, 16–16, 15–23
Pts: Olivinha 13; Rebs: Caracter 11; Asts: Caracter 2		Pts: Pargo 21; Rebs: Randle 9 Asts: four players 2

HSBC Arena, Rio de Janeiro, Brazil
Attendance: 7,000
Referees: Daniel Hierrezuelo (ESP), Recep Ankaralı (TUR), Jorge Vázquez (PUR)

Flamengo Basketball
Number	Position	Player	Points	Rebounds	Assists	Steals	Blocks	Minutes
#1	PF	(Argentina) Herrmann*	9	5	0	1	0	30:00
#4	SG	(Brazil) Marcelinho*	4	4	1	0	0	19:47
#7	PG	(Argentina) Laprovíttola*	5	0	1	1	0	28:09
#11	SF	(Brazil) Marquinhos*	11	4	0	2	0	29:32
#55	C	(United States) Meyinsse*	2	5	1	0	3	18:04
Bench
#5	PG	(Brazil) Danielzinho	0	0	0	0	0	0
#8	SG	(Brazil) Benite	9	4	1	0	0	16:37
#9	SF	(Brazil) Chupeta	0	0	0	0	0	0
#16	SF / PF	(Brazil) Olivinha	13	7	1	0	0	24:05
#19	PG	(Brazil) Gegê	3	0	0	1	0	11:50
#21	PF / C	(Brazil) Felício	0	0	0	0	0	0
#45	C	(United States) Caracter	10	11	2	0	0	21:52
* = Starters
Head Coach					(Brazil) José Alves Neto
Assistant Coach					(Brazil) Rodrigo Silva

Maccabi Electra
Number	Position	Player	Points	Rebounds	Assists	Steals	Blocks	Minutes
#4	PG / SG	(United States) Pargo*	21	5	2	1	0	30:21
#7	PF	(United States) Randle*	8	9	2	1	0	29:05
#10	SF / PF	(Israel) Pnini*	11	4	1	1	0	22:02
#15	SG / SF	(United States) (Israel) Landesberg*	10	5	2	1	0	28:55
#23	C	(Australia) (Serbia) Marić*	2	2	0	0	0	10:39
Bench
#5	PG / SG	(United States) (Georgia (country)) Haynes	5	1	0	0	0	13:27
#6	SG / SF	(United States) Smith	0	0	1	0	0	26:49
#8	SF	(United States) Linhart	2	1	0	0	1	4:43
#9	PF / C	(United States) (Israel) Tyus	8	5	0	0	1	23:49
#11	PF / C	(United States) (Israel) Cohen	0	0	0	0	0	0:25
#12	PG	(Israel) Ohayon	2	1	2	0	0	9:40
#14	PF / C	(Israel) Altit	0	0	0	0	0	0
* = Starters
Head Coach					(Israel) Guy Goodes
Assistant Coach					(Israel) Pini Gershon
Assistant Coach					(Israel) (Germany) Alon Stein

=== Game 2 ===
September 28
12:00

Box Score

Flamengo (Brazil)	90–77	(Israel) Maccabi Electra
Scoring by quarter: 27–25, 19–11, 18–25, 26–16
Pts: Laprovíttola 24; Rebs: Meyinsse 6 Asts: Laprovíttola 6		Pts: Pargo 28; Rebs: Pargo 6 Asts: Pargo 7, Haynes 7

HSBC Arena, Rio de Janeiro, Brazil
Attendance: 14,500
Referees: Jorge Vázquez (PUR), Recep Ankaralı (TUR), Daniel Hierrezuelo (ESP)

Flamengo Basketball
Number	Position	Player	Points	Rebounds	Assists	Steals	Blocks	Minutes
#1	PF	(Argentina) Herrmann*	8	5	2	0	0	30:05
#4	SG	(Brazil) Marcelinho*	5	0	1	0	0	17:09
#7	PG	(Argentina) Laprovíttola*	24	0	6	1	0	30:18
#11	SF	(Brazil) Marquinhos*	9	4	2	0	0	31:35
#55	C	(United States) Meyinsse*	22	6	0	0	1	27:36
Bench
#5	PG	(Brazil) Danielzinho	0	0	0	0	0	0:06
#8	SG	(Brazil) Benite	8	3	0	1	0	23:46
#9	SF	(Brazil) Chupeta	0	0	0	0	0	0
#16	SF / PF	(Brazil) Olivinha	9	5	2	1	0	17:39
#19	PG	(Brazil) Gegê	0	1	1	2	0	9:41
#21	PF / C	(Brazil) Felício	1	1	0	0	0	1:39
#45	C	(United States) Caracter	4	2	0	0	0	10:20
* = Starters
Head Coach					(Brazil) José Alves Neto
Assistant Coach					(Brazil) Rodrigo Silva

Maccabi Electra
Number	Position	Player	Points	Rebounds	Assists	Steals	Blocks	Minutes
#4	PG / SG	(United States) Pargo*	28	6	7	1	1	34:50
#7	PF	(United States) Randle*	6	2	0	3	2	23:16
#10	SF / PF	(Israel) Pnini*	10	1	2	0	0	27:47
#15	SG / SF	(United States) (Israel) Landesberg*	7	5	0	0	0	20:07
#23	C	(Australia) (Serbia) Marić*	4	5	0	1	1	17:06
Bench
#5	PG / SG	(United States) (Georgia (country)) Haynes	15	3	7	1	0	29:20
#6	SG / SF	(United States) Smith	2	2	0	1	0	14:09
#8	SF	(United States) Linhart	0	1	0	0	0	6:01
#9	PF / C	(United States) (Israel) Tyus	4	1	0	0	0	17:10
#11	PF / C	(United States) (Israel) Cohen	1	1	0	0	0	1:30
#12	PG	(Israel) Ohayon	0	2	0	0	0	8:38
#14	PF / C	(Israel) Altit	0	0	0	0	0	0
* = Starters
Head Coach					(Israel) Guy Goodes
Assistant Coach					(Israel) Pini Gershon
Assistant Coach					(Israel) (Germany) Alon Stein

2014 FIBA Intercontinental Cup Champions

Flamengo
1st title

== Rosters ==
Maccabi Electra	Flamengo

Maccabi Electra
Pos	No.	Player
G	4	(United States) Jeremy Pargo
G	5	(United States) (Georgia (country)) MarQuez Haynes
G/F	6	(United States) Devin Smith
PF	7	(United States) Brian Randle
SF	8	(United States) Nate Linhart
F/C	9	(United States) (Israel) Alex Tyus
F	10	(Israel) Guy Pnini (C)
F/C	11	(United States) (Israel) Jake Cohen
PG	12	(Israel) Yogev Ohayon
G/F	15	(United States) (Israel) Sylven Landesberg
C	23	(Australia) (Serbia) Aleks Marić
Did not play
PF	13	(Israel) Idan Zalmanson – Coach's decision
F/C	14	(Israel) Ben Altit – Coach's decision
C	21	(Greece) Sofoklis Schortsanitis – Eye surgery
Head coach:
(Israel) Guy Goodes
Assistant coaches:
(Israel) Pini Gershon
(Israel) Alon Stein

Flamengo
Pos	No.	Player
F	1	(Argentina) Walter Herrmann
G/F	4	(Brazil) Marcelinho Machado (C)
PG	5	(Brazil) Danielzinho
PG	7	(Argentina) Nicolás Laprovíttola
SG	8	(Brazil) Vítor Benite
F	11	(Brazil) Marquinhos Vieira
F	16	(Brazil) Carlos Olivinha
PG	19	(Brazil) Gegê Chaia
F/C	21	(Brazil) Cristiano Felício
F/C	45	(United States) Derrick Caracter
F/C	55	(United States) Jerome Meyinsse
Did not play
G/F	9	(Brazil) Chupeta – Coach's decision
G/F	12	(Brazil) Diego Marques – Coach's decision
Head coach:
(Brazil) José Neto
Assistant coach:
(Brazil) Rodrigo Silva

== Referees ==
- (Turkey) Recep Ankarali
- (Puerto Rico) Jorge Vázquez
- (Spain) Daniel Hierrezuelo

== MVP ==
- (Argentina) Nicolás Laprovíttola - ( (Brazil) Flamengo)
