= Rexhep =

- Gender: Male
- Language: Albanian

Other names
- Related names: Recep (Turkish); Rajab (Arabic)

Rexhep is an Albanian masculine given name. Notable people with the name include:

== Given name ==
- Rexhep Demi (1864–1929), member of the Albanian independence movement, politician
- Rexhep Ferri (1937–2024), Kosovo Albanian artist and writer
- Rexhep Jella, Albanian politician, former mayor of Tirana
- Rexhep Jusufi (died 1943), Albanian-Yugoslav World War II partisan
- Rexhep Krasniqi (1906–1999), Albanian-American historian, teacher, nationalist and anti-communist politician
- Rexhep Maçi (1912–1980), Albanian football player
- Rexhep Pasha Mati (1842–1908), Ottoman marshal, governor, war minister, revolutionary
- Rexhep Meidani (born 1944), Albanian politician, third President of Albania
- Rexhep Memini (born 1994), Albanian footballer
- Rexhep Mitrovica (1887–1967), Albanian politician, 18th Prime Minister of Albania
- Rexhep Qosja (1936–2026), Albanian writer, literary critic and academic
- Rexhep Selimi (born 1971), Kosovar politician
- Rexhep Shala (1882–1943), Albanian politician
- Rexhep Spahiu (1923–1993), Albanian footballer and coach
- Rexhep Xhaka (born 1945), Kosovan coach and former footballer
