= Marcelinho Machado =

Brazilian basketball player

Personal information
- Born: 12 April 1975 (age 51) Rio de Janeiro, Brazil
- Listed height: 6 ft 7 in (2.01 m)
- Listed weight: 210 lb (95 kg)

Career information
- Playing career: 1995–2018
- Position: Small forward / shooting guard
- Number: 4

Career history
- 1995–1996: Fluminense
- 1996–1997: Tijuca
- 1997–1998: Corinthians RS
- 1998–2001: Botafogo
- 2001–2002: Fluminense
- 2002–2003: Rimini Crabs
- 2003–2004: Alerta Cantabria Lobos
- 2004–2005: Telemar/Rio de Janeiro
- 2005-2006: Uberlândia
- 2006–2007: Žalgiris Kaunas
- 2007–2018: Flamengo

Career highlights
- FIBA Intercontinental Cup champion (2014); FIBA AmeriCup MVP (2005); FIBA Americas League champion (2014); FIBA Americas League Grand Finals MVP (2014); FIBA South American League champion (2009); FIBA South American League MVP (2009); 7× Brazilian champion (2005, 2008, 2009, 2013–2016); 2× Brazilian League MVP (2009, 2010); 2× All-Brazilian League Team (2009, 2010); 3× Brazilian League scoring champion (2009–2011); 2× Brazilian League Fan's Player of the Year (2009, 2010); Brazilian League Sixth Man of the Year (2016); 7× Brazilian All-Star (2009–2012, 2014, 2017, 2018); Brazilian All-Star Game MVP (2010); 2× Brazilian All-Star Three-Point champion (2014, 2015); Lithuanian Basketball League champion (2007); LKF Cup champion (2007)

Career NBB statistics
- Points: 5,709 (18.2 ppg)
- Rebounds: 1,232 (3.9 rpg)
- Assists: 972 (3.1 apg)
Medals
Men's basketball
Representing Brazil
Pan American Games
| Gold medal – first place | 1999 Winnipeg |
| Gold medal – first place | 2003 Santo Domingo |
| Gold medal – first place | 2007 Rio de Janeiro |
FIBA AmeriCup
| Silver medal – second place | 2001 Neuquén |
| Gold medal – first place | 2005 Santo Domingo |
| Gold medal – first place | 2009 San Juan |
| Silver medal – second place | 2011 Mar del Plata | {{{2}}} |
FIBA South American Championship
| Gold medal – first place | 1999 Bahía Blanca |
| Silver medal – second place | 2001 Valdivia |
| Gold medal – first place | 2003 Montevidéu |
| Silver medal – second place | 2004 Campos dos Goytacazes |

Marcelo "Marcelinho" Magalhães Machado (born 12 April 1975) is a former Brazilian professional basketball player. At a height of 2.01 m (6 ft 7 in) tall, and a weight of 95 kg (209 lb), he played at the shooting guard and small forward positions, with small forward being his main position. He spent most of his career playing with Flamengo in Brazil's top-tier level NBB league, and he was also a long-time member of the senior men's Brazilian national basketball team.

== Professional career ==
=== Early career and Europe ===
Machado, who was a long-time player of the Brazilian club Flamengo, started his career playing for Fluminense, a team from Rio de Janeiro, one of the greatest Flamengo's rivals. He emerged as one of the greatest hopes of Brazilian basketball as a career then idol Oscar Schmidt was ending, mainly due to the similarities of their game, a player who threw a lot of balls three and did many points. He was soon called to the national team to play the 1999 Pan American Games, in Winnipeg, Canada. The Brazilian team won the tournament, after a win over the American team. He went through teams like Botafogo, Tijuca, Ginástico (MG), Corinthians (PR), Crabs Rimini (ITA), Alerta Lobos Cantabria (ESP), Telemar/Rio de Janeiro, with whom Marcelinho won the Campeonato Brasileiro de Basquete, after a final series against Unitri/Uberlândia, which would be his next team, in 2005. After he played for Uberlândia, Machado went to Lithuania to defend the main team of the country, Žalgiris Kaunas. He stayed in Lithuania until 2007, helping Žalgiris win the national championship and cup, before he signed with Flamengo. He had just won his third Pan American Games, realized in Rio de Janeiro.

=== Flamengo (2007–present) ===
==== 2007–2008 season: Flamengo's first national title ====
The arrival of Marcelinho to Flamengo created much expectation around the team, who had never won the Campeonato Brasileiro de Basquete, not even on the Oscar Schmidt Era. Together with Marcelinho, arrived to the team his brother, the guard Duda Machado, the guard Hélio Lima and other important players.

Machado lead the team to a one-defeat campaign in the regular season. Besides, he scored 46 points in a game, which the record in that season, and made averages of 24,4 points per game and 2,9 steals per game. Beside Duda, Hélio, the center Fernando Coloneze and the power forward Jefferson William, Marcelinho lead Flamengo to the final, against the champion of the previous season, Brasília, which would become the greatest rival of Flamengo in the national scene.

In the final series, Flamengo won by 3–0 and won its first national title.

==== 2008–2009 season: The First NBB and the first MVP ====
On 28 January 2009, it was disputed the first game in NBB's history, between Flamengo and Pinheiros. Marcelinho played a great match, with 36 points in a 90–89 win, dueling with the Pinheiros' forward Marquinhos, his teammate in the Brazilian national team. Two days later, Machado scored 31 points and recorded 4 steals in a 96–87 win against Paulistano.

Keeping the previous season champion team's base, Flamengo acquired an important teammate to Marcelinho: the former NBA center Rafael "Baby" Araújo.

On 1 March, Marcelinho made 30 points and 5 assists, and led the team to a 103–97 win over Bauru, with 36 efficiency points. On 22 April, Machado almost got a double-double, with 25 points and 7 assists, leading Flamengo to the great difference in points, with a 99–49 win over Saldanha da Gama.

In the middle of the season, Marcelinho was chosen for the NBB All Star Game as the most voted player. He scored 25 points, but his team did not win the game.

Marcelinho led his team to 27–win streak, the greatest one in NBB's history, until the defeat in the Game 2 of the NBB Finals, against Brasília. In the Game 5, Baby got into a fight with one of the players of Brasilia and was excluded from the game. That way, fitted Marcelo take responsibility to decide for Flamengo. That happened, when Marcelinho scored 27 points and, beside his teammates, won the first NBB in the history, after 76–68 win.

At the end of the season, Marcelinho won the NBB Top Scoring Award, the NBB MVP Award and was chosen for the NBB All-First Team.

==== 2009–2010 season: The Reign of MVP ====
Soon in the first game of the 2009–10 NBB season (NBB 2), Marcelo showed why he was chosen the MVP of the previous season. He scored 39 points against CETAF/Vila Velha, in a 99–70 win, on 1 November 2009. Flamengo had signed the forward-center Guilherme Teichmann, from Limeira, to replace Rafael Araújo, who had gone to Paulistano.

On 22 January 2010, Marcelinho scored 28 points and 5 steals, with 33 of efficiency, against Bauru, and Flamengo by 107–90. Two days later, he scored 45 points, 3 assists and 5 steals, making incredible 49 points of efficiency, against Assis. On 5 February 2010, in the first game of the runoff, against CETAF/Vila Velha, the center Manuil, from Vila Velha, elbowed Duda Machado, who fainted on the court. It happened in the begin of the 4th quarter, when Flamengo was winning by 74–60. Manuil had claimed that Duda attacked him twice before, protecting Marcelo.

On 18 February 2010, the LNB announced the teams for the NBB All-Star Game, realized in Uberlândia. Marcelinho was chosen as one of the starters, as in the previous season. Three days later, Machado's team won the All-Star Game, with Marcelo scoring 38 points and being chosen the All-Star Game MVP. On 7 March 2010, Marcelinho broke the record for points in a game that belonged to Oscar Schmidt. He scored 63 points in a 101–89 win over São José. In that game, he made 16 three-pointers, another record in the Brazilian basketball.

In the semifinal series of the playoffs, Marcelinho was responsible for classification of Flamengo to the Finals, with a threes-pointer missing 5 seconds to the end of the Game 4. In the Finals, against Brasília one more time, Marcelinho e his teammates could not avoid their rivals' title, after a 3–2 series for Brasília. But, despite this defeat Marcelo won the NBB Top Scoring Award, the NBB MVP Award and was chosen for the NBB All-First Team for the second time.

==== 2010–2011 season: The double-double season ====
The 2010–2011 NBB season (NBB 3) began the same way: on 17 November 2010, Marcelo scored 28 points, 5 assists and 5 steals against Vila Velha, winning by 90–70. Four days later, Flamengo obtained the highest points difference in the history of the NBB, in a 112–58 win against CECRE/Vitória. Marcelinho made a double-double, with 33 points and 10 assists.

On 3 December 2010, and 25 January 2011, he almost made other two double-doubles in the 91–74 and 99–86 wins over Assis and Araraquara, when he scored 39 points and 8 assists, and 43 points and 8 assists, respectively.

On 12 December 2010, Marcelo made another double-double in the 90–88 defeat against Pinheiros, with 30 points and 10 rebounds. On 7 January 2011, another double-double against Joinville, with 27 points and 11 rebounds, and an 85–78 win. And finally, on 27 March 2011, the last double-double against Brasília, with 27 points and 11 rebounds, in the 93–80 win.

In the playoffs, Marcelinho led Flamengo to the semifinals, after a 3–1 series against Bauru. Marcelinho scored a 24-point average in that series. But in the semifinal series, Flamengo was eliminated by Franca, after 3 games. Marcelinho scored 32 points in the Game 1, 40 points in the Game 2, and 27 points in the Game 3. In that game, he became involved in a mess with the point guard from Franca Fernando Penna. It started when Penna passed the ball between the forward David Teague's legs to escape his marking. Marcelinho did not like that and said that Penna disrespected his teammate, but actually Fernando used a feature to clear your opponent.

Still in the same season, on 26 January 2011, Machado was again chosen as starter of the NBB All Star Game, to defend NBB Brasil (NBB Brazil), the team formed by Brazilian players. At the end of the season, Marcelinho won again the NBB Top Scoring Award, but he was not chosen for the NBB All-First Team.

==== 2011–2012 season: The second fall in the Semifinals ====
In the 2011–2012 NBB season (NBB 4), Machado just started to play in the third game of Flamengo in the season, due to his suspension because of the fight with Fernando Penna. In that game, realized on 24 November 2011, against Minas, he scored 26 points and 5 assists.

Two days later, Marcelinho was close to score his first triple-double in NBB, against Brasília, with 25 points, 9 rebounds and 8 assists, in the 110–72 win. On 10 December 2011, another double-double, with 23 points and 13 assists in a 101–98 win over São José.

On 3 March 2012, Machado scored 34 points and 5 rebounds against Vila Velha, and Flamengo won by 72–60. On 8 March 2012, Marcelinho substituted Marquinhos in the starting lineup of NBB Brasil in the NBB All Star Game, due to an injury suffered by the Pinheiros' forward. He scored 7 points in 17 minutes in his 4th All Star Game.

In the playoffs, Machado, beside his teammates Caio Torres, Federico Kammerichs and David Jackson eliminated Uberlândia after five games, reaching the semifinals for the fourth time. But, as the previous season, Flamengo fell in the semifinals, this time against São José, by 3–2.

Marcelinho finished the season with a 20,6-point average, his lowest average since the begin of NBB.

==== 2012–2013 season: Injured season, Flamengo's second NBB ====
For the 2012–2013 NBB season (NBB 5), Flamengo mounted a super-team, hiring players like Marquinhos and Olivinha, from Pinheiros, Vítor Benite, from Limeira, Kojo Mensah and Shilton, from Joinville, and Gegê Chaia, from Tijuca, besides keeping players like Caio Torres and Duda Machado. The goal was to win NBB, title that was far from Gávea three seasons.

But soon in the first game, against Vila Velha, Marcelinho ruptured the ACL in the begin of the second quarter, which kept him out of the courts throughout the rest of the season. In January, 2013, Flamengo hired the Paraguayan Bruno Zanotti to replace Marcelinho, who saw his team win the NBB at the end of the season.

==== 2013–2014 season: The Return and the most successful season in Flamengo's history ====
The 2013–14 season went down in Flamengo's history, with the inedited titles of the FIBA Americas League and the Intercontinental Cup and the first games against NBA teams in the club's history. On 30 November 2013, Marcelinho returned to the courts against Paulistano. He played 21 minutes and scored 19 points in the 80–58 win. He also scored 19 points against Espírito Santo Basquete, former Vila Velha, whom Flamengo won by 77–60. On 19 December 2013, Marcelinho helped his teammates with 16 points, led by an inspirational Olivinha, who scored 18 points and 16 rebounds, to win the leader Limeira, in Limeira, by 88–67. Two days later, he scored 21 points against Bauru, and Flamengo, again led by Olivinha, won by 96–94.

On 7 January 2014, Flamengo played against Macaé Basquete in the first game in the NBB's history between the two teams. It was also the first time Marcelinho Machado played against his brother, Duda Machado, who had signed with Macaé in the begin of the season, and the first time Duda Machado played against the team he defended for seven seasons. Flamengo won by 79–69 and Marcelinho scored 18 points and 4 rebounds, but Duda had the highest scoring, with 29 points.

On 24 January 2014, the team started its path in FIBA Americas League in Arecibo, Puerto Rico, at the same group of Leones de Quilpué, Mavort and the host Capitanes de Arecibo. After winning all its opponents, the team set the first place.

== National team career ==
Machado was a long-time member of the senior Brazilian national basketball team. With Brazil, he played at the following major tournaments: the 1998 FIBA World Cup, the 2002 FIBA World Cup, the 2003 FIBA AmeriCup, the 2005 FIBA AmeriCup, the 2006 FIBA World Cup, the 2007 FIBA AmeriCup, the 2009 FIBA AmeriCup, the 2010 FIBA World Cup, the 2011 FIBA AmeriCup, the 2012 Summer Olympics, and the 2014 FIBA World Cup.

He was the leading scorer, and was also voted the MVP of the 2005 FIBA AmeriCup.

== Personal ==
Marcelinho's father, Renê Machado, was a Brazilian club basketball player in the 1960s and 1970s. His uncle, Sérgio "Macarrão" Toledo Machado, was also a successful basketball player with the senior men's Brazilian national basketball team, in the 1960s and 1970s. Marcelinho's younger brother, Duda Machado, also represented Brazil's senior national team.

== NBB statistics ==
| † | Denotes seasons in which Marcelinho won NBB championship |
| * | Led the league |
| ‡ | NBB record |

=== NBB regular season ===
| Season | Team | GP | MPG | 2PT FG% | 3PT FG% | FT% | RPG | APG | SPG | BPG | PPG |
|---|---|---|---|---|---|---|---|---|---|---|---|
| 2009† | Flamengo | 28 | 36.9* | .600 | .449 | .871 | 6.1 | 3.7 | 2.1 | .2 | 26.3* |
| 2009–10 | Flamengo | 26 | 36.6* | .568 | .430 | .813 | 6.3 | 2.5 | 2.4 | .2 | 27.3* |
| 2010–11 | Flamengo | 28 | 32.5 | .555 | .397 | .859 | 5.0 | 3.7 | 1.9 | .1 | 25.8* |
| 2011–12 | Flamengo | 22 | 33.5 | .510 | .392 | .855 | 4.1 | 3.8 | 1.3 | .1 | 21.3 |
| 2012–13† | Flamengo | 1 | 12.0 | 1.000 | .0 | .0 | 2.0 | 2.0 | 1.0 | .0 | 2.0 |
| 2013–14† | Flamengo | 27 | 30.8 | .486 | .395 | .904 | 3.0 | 2.5 | 1.0 | .0 | 19.0 |
| 2014–15† | Flamengo | 25 | 23.1 | .418 | .398 | .778 | 2.0 | 2.2 | .6 | .1 | 11.4 |
| 2015–16† | Flamengo | 26 | 22.8 | .479 | .396 | .857 | 2.4 | 3.1 | 1.2 | .1 | 11.7 |
| 2016–17 | Flamengo | 23 | 28.6 | .452 | .332 | .839 | 3.4 | 4.3 | 1.0 | .1 | 15.7 |
| 2017–18 | Flamengo | 24 | 18.7 | .564 | .389 | .857 | 2.6 | 2.9 | .3 | .1 | 8.0 |
| Career | | 230 | 29.4 | .525 | .401 | .851 | 3.9 | 3.2 | 1.3 | .1 | 18.7 |
| All-Star | | 5 | – | – | – | – | – | – | – | - | 20.7 |

=== NBB playoffs ===
| Season | Team | GP | MPG | 2PT FG% | 3PT FG% | FT% | RPG | APG | SPG | BPG | PPG |
|---|---|---|---|---|---|---|---|---|---|---|---|
| 2009† | Flamengo | 11 | 37.8 | .520 | .385 | .857 | 6.5 | 2.5 | 1.7 | .2 | 28.4 |
| 2010 | Flamengo | 12 | 36.8 | .442 | .405 | .887 | 6.0 | 3.3 | 1.2 | .2 | 23.0 |
| 2011 | Flamengo | 7 | 36.2 | .591 | .400 | .846 | 4.7 | 2.1 | 1.0 | .1 | 27.8 |
| 2012 | Flamengo | 10 | 35.4 | .475 | .284 | .852 | 3.0 | 3.5 | 1.7 | .1 | 19.1 |
| 2014† | Flamengo | 9 | 29.1 | .343 | .309 | .767 | 3.7 | 2.6 | .9 | .1 | 12.2 |
| 2015† | Flamengo | 9 | 19.6 | .600 | .425 | 1.000 | 1.6 | 2.0 | .9 | .0 | 7.9 |
| 2016† | Flamengo | 13 | 23.6 | .293 | .416 | .811 | 3.3 | 3.8 | .9 | .1 | 11.5 |
| 2017 | Flamengo | 5 | 23.4 | .467 | .297 | .875 | 2.0 | 2.8 | .8 | .0 | 10.8 |
| 2018 | Flamengo | 7 | 20.4 | .467 | .306 | 1.000 | 2.9 | 3.0 | .6 | .0 | 8.3 |
| Career | | 84 | 29.4 | .457 | .364 | .853 | 3.9 | 2.9 | 1.1 | .1 | 16.9 |

== EuroLeague ==
=== EuroLeague statistics ===
| Year | Team | GP | GS | MPG | FG% | 3P% | FT% | RPG | APG | SPG | BPG | PPG | PIR |
|---|---|---|---|---|---|---|---|---|---|---|---|---|---|
| 2006–07 | Žalgiris | 12 | 11 | 26.3 | .395 | .263 | .1000 | 2.9 | 1.8 | .9 | .0 | 7.7 | 4.6 |
