= Rajab (name) =

Rajab (Arabic: رجب) is a masculine Arabic given name corresponding to the seventh month of the Islamic calendar which is known as Rajab, it is transcribed as Recep in Turkish, and Ragab from Egyptian Arabic, and Rexhep in Albanian. The Bengali name "Rajeeb/Rajib" (Bengali: রাজীব/রাজিব) is derivative form of Arabic word "Rajab" and can be used both as given name or a surname.

== Given name ==
- Ragab Abdelhay, Egyptian weightlifter
- Rajab Ali, Kenyan cricketer
- Babu Rajab Ali, Indian writer
- Omar Rajab Amin, Kuwaiti prisoner
- Rajab Bursi, Iraqi Sufi
- Ismail Ahmed Rajab Al Hadidi, Iraqi politician
- Salih Rajab al-Mismari, Libyan politician
- Rajab Mwinyi, Burundian footballer

=== Rajib ===
- Rajeeb Samdani, Bangladeshi industrialist and art collector
- Wasimul Bari Rajib, Bengali actor.
- Rajib Ashraf, Bengali writer, Lyricist, filmmaker and actor.
- Rajibul Islam, Bangladeshi cricketer

== Surname ==
- Abdallah Ragab, Egyptian footballer
- Ahmed Ragab (satirist), Egyptian satirist
- Ahmed Ragab (sailor), Egyptian sailor
- Hind Rajab (2018–2024), Palestinian girl killed by Israeli military
- Muhammad az-Zaruq Rajab, Libyan politician
- Nabeel Rajab, Bahrani human rights activist
- Abdul Hafez Salem Rajab, Omani politician
- Sauda Rajab, Kenyan business executive
