= Gegê Chaia =

Brazilian basketball player

No. 19 – Corinthians
- Position: Point guard
- League: NBB

Personal information
- Born: February 3, 1991 (age 35) Rio de Janeiro
- Listed height: 6 ft 2 in (1.88 m)
- Listed weight: 190 lb (86 kg)

Career information
- Playing career: 2008–present

Career history
- 2008–2011: Baloncesto Torrejón
- 2010–2011: → Flamengo
- 2011–2012: Tijuca
- 2012–2016: Flamengo
- 2016–2017: Bauru
- 2017–2020: Minas
- 2020–present: Corinthians

Career highlights
- FIBA Intercontinental Cup champion (2014); FIBA Americas League champion (2014); 5× Brazilian League champion (2013–2017); Brazilian Developmental League champion (2011)

George Frederico Torres Homem Chaia (born February 3, 1991, in Rio de Janeiro), commonly known as "Gegê" Chaia, is a Brazilian professional basketball player, who currently plays as point guard for Corinthians in the Novo Basquete Brasil (NBB).

== Professional career ==
Chaia started his career at Tijuca, but then moved to Spanish club Baloncesto Torrejón in 2008, where he became a professional player. In 2010, he transferred to Flamengo, on a one-season loan spell. In that season he won the Brazilian Developmental League youth age championship.

=== Tijuca Tênis Clube ===
For the 2011–12 NBB season, Chaia signed with his former club, Tijuca Tênis Clube and debuted in the NBB. He didn't have any impressive numbers, but managed to play in four postseason games.

=== Flamengo ===
In 2012, Chaia once again signed with Flamengo. This time with more experience, he became the team's back-up point guard, and with them he won the 2012–13 season championship of the Brazilian NBB league. In the next season, 2013–14, Chaia got even more playing time, and was more consistently in the team's rotation. In that season, he averaged 6.2 points and 5.4 assists per game in the Brazilian NBB's regular season. That season, he also won the 2014 FIBA Americas League and the 2013–14 season championship of the Brazilian NBB league.

His most important career achievement came at the beginning of the 2014–15 season, when his team, Flamengo, defeated Maccabi Tel Aviv, on aggregate score, in a two-game series, to become the 2014 FIBA Intercontinental Cup champions.

== NBB statistics ==
=== NBB regular season ===
Season	Team	GP	MPG	2PT FG%	3PT FG%	FT%	RPG	APG	SPG	BPG	PPG
2011–12	Tijuca	27	17.7	.517	.342	.625	1.7	1.8	1.0	.0	4.8
2012–13	Flamengo	34	17.7	.393	.264	.771	2.1	2.1	.7	.0	3.5
2013–14	Flamengo	32	30.0	.553	.316	.795	2.3	5.4	1.5	.0	6.2
2014–15	Flamengo	26	16.7	.357	.304	.750	1.1	3.3	.7	.0	3.2
2015–16	Flamengo	24	17.8	.455	.302	1.000	2.3	2.6	.8	.0	3.1
Career		143	20.0	.473	.306	.743	1.9	3.0	.9	.0	4.2

=== NBB playoffs ===
Season	Team	GP	MPG	2PT FG%	3PT FG%	FT%	RPG	APG	SPG	BPG	PPG
2012	Tijuca	4	22.5	.333	.067	.833	1.8	1.5	1.5	.3	4.8
2013	Flamengo	9	13.7	.400	.450	1.000	.9	1.4	.4	.0	3.9
2014	Flamengo	9	14.8	.600	.125	1.000	1.6	2.0	1.3	.0	2.7
2015	Flamengo	10	13.2	.444	.071	.000	.8	2.4	1.2	.0	1.1
2016	Flamengo	12	7.6	.500	.167	.500	.5	.8	.5	.0	1.1
Career		44	14.4	.457	.193	.733	1.1	1.6	1.0	.1	2.3
