= Derrick Caracter =

American basketball player (born 1988)

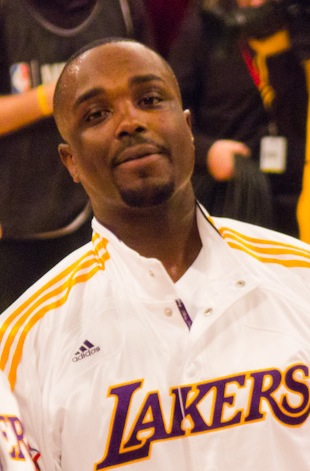
- Caracter with the Los Angeles Lakers in 2010

Personal information
- Born: May 4, 1988 (age 38) Fanwood, New Jersey, U.S.
- Listed height: 6 ft 9 in (2.06 m)
- Listed weight: 276 lb (125 kg)

Career information
- High school: St. Patrick (Elizabeth, New Jersey); Scotch Plains-Fanwood (Scotch Plains, New Jersey); Notre Dame Prep (Fitchburg, Massachusetts)
- College: Louisville (2006–2008); UTEP (2009–2010)
- NBA draft: 2010: 2nd round, 58th overall pick
- Drafted by: Los Angeles Lakers
- Playing career: 2010–2018
- Position: Power forward / center
- Number: 45

Career history
- 2010–2012: Los Angeles Lakers
- 2011: →Bakersfield Jam
- 2012: →Los Angeles D-Fenders
- 2012: Rio Grande Valley Vipers
- 2012: Idaho Stampede
- 2012: Mets de Guaynabo
- 2012–2013: Bnei Herzliya
- 2013: Pieno žvaigždės Pasvalys
- 2014: Idaho Stampede
- 2014: Flamengo
- 2015: Yulon Dinos
- 2015: Club Atlético Atenas
- 2015: GlobalPort Batang Pier
- 2015–2016: Erie BayHawks
- 2016: Hapoel Ramat Gan Givatayim
- 2016: Prievidza
- 2016: A.S. Ramat HaSharon
- 2017: Atletico Echague Parana
- 2018: Capitanes de Arecibo

Career highlights
- FIBA Intercontinental Cup champion (2014); Second-team All-C-USA (2010)
- Stats at NBA.com
- Stats at Basketball Reference

Derrick Eugene Caracter (born May 4, 1988) is an American former professional basketball player who played briefly in the National Basketball Association (NBA) for the Los Angeles Lakers. He played college basketball for the Louisville Cardinals and UTEP Miners.

== High school and college career ==
Caracter grew up in Fanwood, New Jersey. He began attracting interest from college scouts in 2002 at the age of 14. He played high school basketball at St. Patrick High School as a freshman, and attended Scotch Plains-Fanwood High School as a sophomore before returning to St. Patrick's for his junior year. Caracter transferred to a boarding school, Notre Dame Preparatory School, during his senior year to focus on academics. In 2006, he began his college career at the University of Louisville.

He withdrew from the 2008 NBA draft and later that summer left the University of Louisville. He then enrolled at UTEP and, as required by NCAA regulations, sat out the 2008–09 basketball season. He became eligible to play in the second half of the 2009–10 season where he averaged 14.1 points and 8.1 rebounds in 27 games as a junior with the Miners. In three college seasons, he averaged 10.2 points (.560 FG%) and 5.6 rebounds in 80 games (36 starts).

== Professional career ==
=== Los Angeles Lakers (2010–2012) ===
==== 2010–11 season ====
Caracter was selected with the 58th overall pick by the Los Angeles Lakers in the 2010 NBA draft. He joined the Lakers for the 2010 NBA Summer League. On August 15, 2010, he signed a multi-year, rookie deal with the Lakers. On March 29, 2011, he was assigned to the Bakersfield Jam of the NBA D-League. On April 5, 2011, he was recalled by the Lakers. He was reassigned to the Jam the next day. On April 13, he was again recalled by the Lakers.

==== 2011–12 season ====
On December 12, 2011, Caracter tore his left lateral meniscus during practice. Throughout rehabilitation he attended team games, but didn't return to play. On January 25, 2012, he was assigned to the Los Angeles D-Fenders. On February 7, 2012, he was recalled by the Lakers and subsequently waived the same day.

On February 22, 2012, he was acquired by the Rio Grande Valley Vipers. On March 22, 2012, he was waived by the Vipers. On March 26, 2012, he was acquired by the Idaho Stampede. On April 21, 2012, he signed with Mets de Guaynabo for the rest of the 2012 BSN season. In his debut, he recorded 17 points and 5 rebounds in 19 minutes of play. On May 1, 2012, he left Mets de Guaynabo.

=== 2012–13 season ===
In July 2012, he joined the Atlanta Hawks for the 2012 NBA Summer League. He later signed with Guangdong Southern Tigers of China for the 2012–13 season. On November 19, 2012, he left Guangdong after one pre-season game.

On December 4, 2012, he signed with Bnei Herzliya of Israel for the rest of the season.

=== 2013–14 season ===
On August 26, 2013, he signed with Śląsk Wrocław of Poland. On September 4, 2013, he was released before playing in a game for them.

On October 11, 2013, he signed with BC Pieno žvaigždės of Lithuania for the rest of the 2013–14 season. In December 2013, he left Pieno.

On January 29, 2014, he was acquired by the Idaho Stampede.

=== 2014–15 season ===
On September 19, 2014, Caracter signed a one-year deal with Flamengo Basketball of the Novo Basquete Brasil. He went on to help Flamengo win the 2014 FIBA Intercontinental Cup nine days later before leaving the club in October 2014. He went on to have a stint in Taiwan and Uruguay in early 2015 before signing with GlobalPort Batang Pier of the Philippine Basketball Association on March 11.

=== 2015–16 season ===
On October 31, 2015, Caracter was acquired by the Erie BayHawks of the NBA Development League. On November 14, he made his debut for the BayHawks in an 83–79 loss to the Westchester Knicks, recording seven points and nine rebounds in 21 minutes. On February 2, 2016, he was waived by the BayHawks. In 24 games, he averaged 4.8 points and 3.6 rebounds on 44% shooting in 11.3 minutes of play. On February 24, he signed with Hapoel Ramat Gan Givatayim of the Liga Leumit.

=== 2016–17 season ===
On September 6, 2016, Caracter signed with BC Prievidza of the Slovak Extraliga. He left Prievidza after appearing in only two games, and on October 5, 2016, he signed with Israeli club A.S. Ramat HaSharon of the Liga Leumit. On December 28, 2016, he left Hasharon and signed in Argentina with Atletico Echague Parana of the Liga Nacional de Básquet.

=== 2017–18 season ===
On January 11, 2018, Caracter signed with Capitanes de Arecibo.

== NBA career statistics ==
Legend
GP	Games played	GS	Games started	MPG	Minutes per game
FG%	Field goal percentage	3P%	3-point field goal percentage	FT%	Free throw percentage
RPG	Rebounds per game	APG	Assists per game	SPG	Steals per game
BPG	Blocks per game	PPG	Points per game	**Bold**	Career high

=== Regular season ===
Year	Team	GP	GS	MPG	FG%	3P%	FT%	RPG	APG	SPG	BPG	PPG
2010–11	L.A. Lakers	41	0	5.2	.485	.000	.739	1.0	.2	.1	.2	2.0
Career		41	0	5.2	.485	.000	.739	1.0	.2	.1	.2	2.0
