= Recep's chub =

Scientific classification
- Kingdom: Animalia
- Phylum: Chordata
- Class: Actinopterygii
- Order: Cypriniformes
- Family: Leuciscidae
- Subfamily: Leuciscinae
- Genus: Alburnoides
- Species: A. recepi

Binomial name
- Alburnoides recepi Turan, Kaya, Ekmekçi & Doğan, 2014

Species of fish

Recep's chub (Alburnoides recepi) is a species of freshwater fish in the family Cyprinidae. It is endemic to the Euphrates River drainage in Turkey.
