= Rajab Mwinyi =

Burundian footballer

Personal information
- Date of birth: August 1, 1984 (age 42)
- Place of birth: Bujumbura, Burundi
- Position: Midfielder

Team information
- Current team: Simba SC
- Number: 7

Senior career*
Years	Team	Apps	(Gls)
2003	Young Africans FC		
2004–	Simba SC		

International career^{‡}
2003–	Burundi	4	(0)
- * Club domestic league appearances and goals as of 9 November 2007 ‡ National team caps and goals as of 9 November 2007

Rajab Mwinyi (born January 10, 1984, in Bujumbura) is a Burundian midfield player who plays for Simba SC in Dar es Salaam. He is also a member of the Burundi national football team.
