= Walter Herrmann =

Argentine basketball player (born 1979)

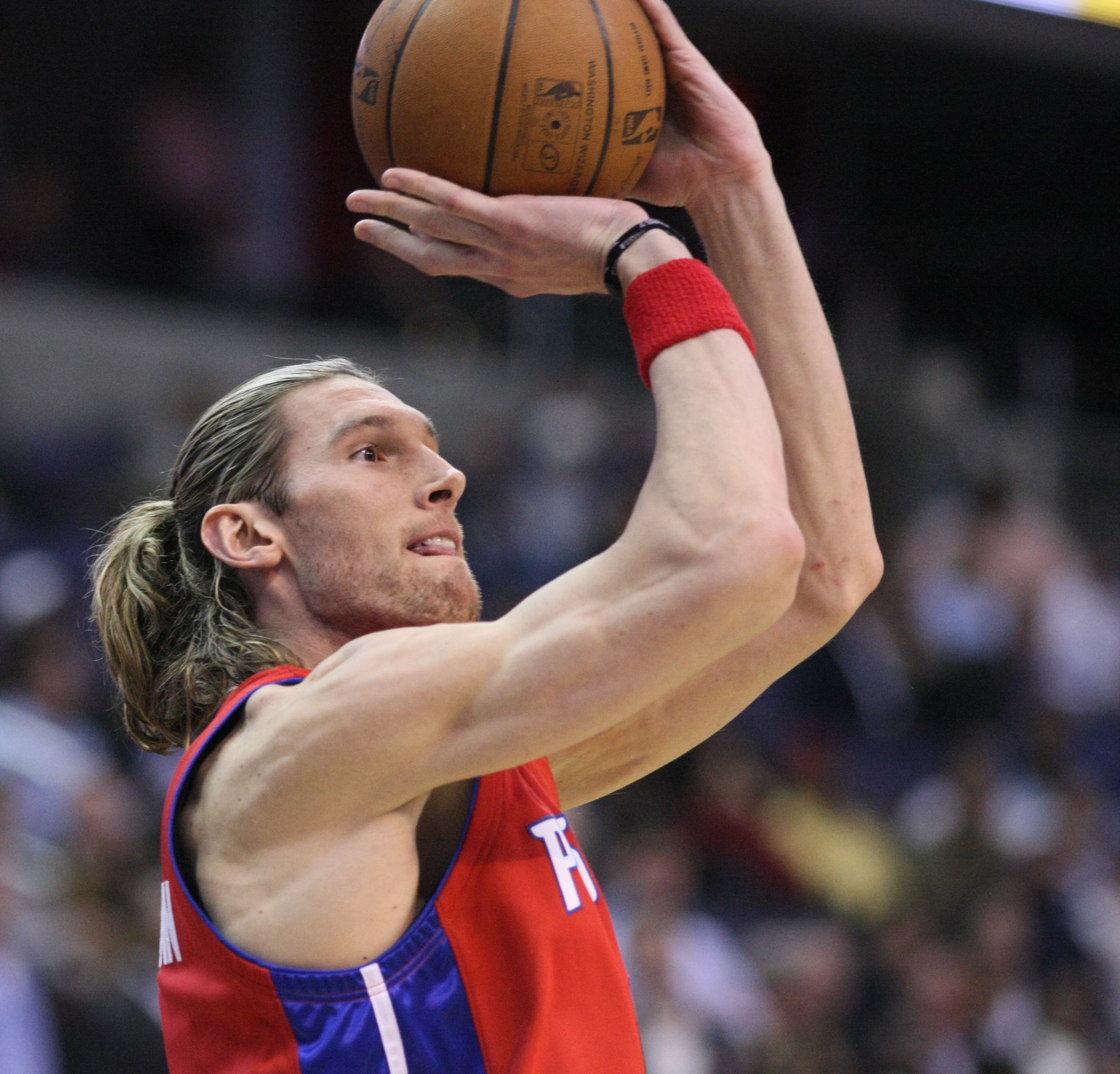
- Herrmann with the Detroit Pistons in 2008

Personal information
- Born: 26 June 1979 (age 47) Venado Tuerto, Santa Fe, Argentina
- Listed height: 6 ft 9 in (2.06 m)
- Listed weight: 225 lb (102 kg)

Career information
- NBA draft: 2001: undrafted
- Playing career: 1996–2019
- Position: Small forward
- Number: 5

Career history
- 1996–2000: Olimpia de Venado Tuerto
- 2000–2002: Atenas de Córdoba
- 2002–2003: Jabones Pardo Fuenlabrada
- 2003–2006: Unicaja Málaga
- 2006–2007: Charlotte Bobcats
- 2007–2009: Detroit Pistons
- 2009–2010: Caja Laboral
- 2011–2012: Unión Deportiva de Venado Tuerto
- 2013–2014: Atenas de Córdoba
- 2014–2015: Flamengo
- 2015–2016: San Lorenzo
- 2016–2018: Obras Sanitarias
- 2018–2019: Atenas de Córdoba

Career highlights
- NBA All-Rookie Second Team (2007); FIBA Intercontinental Cup champion (2014); 2× Spanish League champion (2006, 2010); Spanish Cup winner (2005); Spanish League MVP (2003); Spanish League Top Scorer (2003); Spanish All-Star Game MVP (2003); Brazilian League champion (2015); Brazilian League All-Star (2015); 2× Argentine League champion (2002, 2016); 2× Argentine League MVP (2001, 2014); 2× Argentine League Finals MVP (2002, 2016); Argentine League Revelation of the Year (1999)
- Stats at NBA.com
- Stats at Basketball Reference
Medals
Men's basketball
Representing Argentina
Summer Olympic Games
Gold medal – first place	2004 Athens
FIBA South American Championship
Gold medal – first place	2001 Valdivia
Gold medal – first place	2004 Rio de Janeiro
Goodwill Games
Silver medal – second place	2001 Brisbane

Walter Herrmann Heinrich (born 26 June 1979) is an Argentine former professional basketball player. He is listed at 6'9" and 225 lbs. He was a key member of the senior men's Argentine national basketball team that won the gold medal during the 2004 Summer Olympic Games.

== Professional career ==
=== Argentina ===
Herrmann began his pro career in the top-tier level Argentine League with Olimpia Venado Tuerto in 1996. He played there until the year 2000. He won two Argentine League slam dunk contests during that time in 1999 and 2000, and the Argentine League Revelation of the Year award (best rookie) in 1999. In 2000, he moved to the Argentine club Atenas Córdoba, and he played there until 2002. With Atenas, he was named the MVP of the Argentine League regular season in 2001, and the MVP of the Argentine League Finals in 2002.

After a 16 month long hiatus from last playing basketball in Spain, during the 2009–2010 season; Herrmann returned to Argentina in 2011, to play in a local regional minor league with Unión Deportiva de Venado Tuerto. He spent the 2013–14 season with Atenas de Córdoba. He was the Argentine League's MVP in 2014.

After playing in the Brazilian League, during the 2014–15 season, he spent the 2015–16 season with the Argentine club San Lorenzo, with whom he won the Argentine League championship, and the Argentine League's Finals MVP award. He moved to the Argentine League club Obras Sanitarias, for the 2016–17 season. He moved to the Argentine club Atenas de Córdoba, prior to the 2018–19 season.

=== Spain ===
Herrmann moved to the Spanish ACB League club Baloncesto Fuenlabrada for the 2002–03 season. He was named the regular season ACB League MVP that year. He then moved the Spanish club Unicaja Málaga and he played there until the year 2006. Then he moved on to the NBA (National Basketball Association). He returned to the Spanish League in July 2009, when he signed a 4-year contract worth €5.05 million euros net income with Saski Baskonia. The last two years of the contract being team options.

=== NBA ===
In 2006, Herrmann signed a one-year contract worth $1.8 million with a team option for a 2nd year to play for the NBA's Charlotte Bobcats during the 2006–07 NBA season Herrmann won the NBA Eastern Conference Rookie of the Month Award in March 2007. In his 13 March games, Herrmann averaged 12.1 points and 4.2 rebounds per game and he shot 58.5 percent from the field and 47.2 percent from 3-point range.

Herrmann finished the 2006–07 NBA season averaging 9.2 points per game and 2.9 rebounds per game. Walter scored his NBA career-high 30 points against the Milwaukee Bucks on April 14 and also grabbed a career high 7 defensive rebounds in the same game. Walter made the NBA All-Rookie Second Team along with his teammate Adam Morrison at the end of the season. After the season was over, the Bobcats activated their team option on Herrmann for the 2007–08 NBA season, paying him $1.944 million.

On December 14, 2007, Herrmann, along with center Primož Brezec, was traded to the Detroit Pistons in exchange for center Nazr Mohammed. On August 2, 2008, it was announced that Herrmann had signed a one-year deal to keep him in Detroit for another season.

Herrmann's final NBA game was in Game 4 of the 2009 Eastern Conference First Round against the Cleveland Cavaliers on April 26, 2009. In that game, Herrman played for 6 and half minutes and recorded no stats, while Detroit lost the game 78–99. Losing Game 4 caused Detroit to lose the series in a 4–0 sweep.

=== Brazil ===
Herrmann spent the 2014–15 season, playing in the top-tier level Brazilian League, with Flamengo. With Flamengo, he won the 2014 edition of the FIBA Intercontinental Cup, and the Brazilian League's 2014–15 season championship.

== National team career ==
Herrmann was a key reserve for years on the senior men's Argentine national basketball team. With Argentina's national team, he won the gold medal at the 2001 and 2004 South American Championship. He also was part of the squad that won the gold medal at the 2004 Summer Olympic Games.

Herrmann also played at the 2006 FIBA World Championship with Argentina's national team. In 2012, he was invited to re-join Argentina's national team. He also played at the 2014 FIBA World Cup.

== Personal life ==
The son of Héctor Herrmann and María Cristina Heinrich, Walter Herrmann is of German descent. He lost his mother, his younger sister and his fiancée in a car accident in July 2003. Exactly one year later, his father died of a heart attack. Herrmann is married to Spanish doctor Elena, whose father worked in CB Málaga when he played there. They have two children, Barbara (named after Hermann's deceased sister) and Leyton. Hermann also has a son, Federico, from a previous relationship.

== NBA career statistics ==
Legend
GP	Games played	GS	Games started	MPG	Minutes per game
FG%	Field goal percentage	3P%	3-point field goal percentage	FT%	Free throw percentage
RPG	Rebounds per game	APG	Assists per game	SPG	Steals per game
BPG	Blocks per game	PPG	Points per game	**Bold**	Career high

=== Regular season ===
Year	Team	GP	GS	MPG	FG%	3P%	FT%	RPG	APG	SPG	BPG	PPG
2006–07	Charlotte	48	**12**	**19.5**	**.527**	**.461**	.774	**2.9**	**.5**	**.4**	**.1**	**9.2**
2007–08	Charlotte	17	0	10.2	.385	.346	**.900**	2.1	.2	.2	.0	4.0
2007–08	Detroit	28	0	7.1	.392	.289	.800	1.3	**.5**	.1	.0	3.0
2008–09	Detroit	**59**	0	10.7	.396	.342	.760	1.8	.4	.1	**.1**	3.8
Career		152	12	12.8	.458	.381	.786	2.1	.4	.2	.1	5.4

=== Playoffs ===
Year	Team	GP	GS	MPG	FG%	3P%	FT%	RPG	APG	SPG	BPG	PPG
2008	Detroit	**4**	0	**6.8**	.250	**1.000**	**.500**	**.3**	.0	.0	.0	1.3
2009	Detroit	**4**	0	5.5	**.375**	.500	.000	**.3**	**.5**	**.3**	.0	**2.0**
Career		8	0	6.1	.333	.600	.500	.3	.3	.1	.0	1.6
