= Recep Ankaralı =

Turkish basketball referee

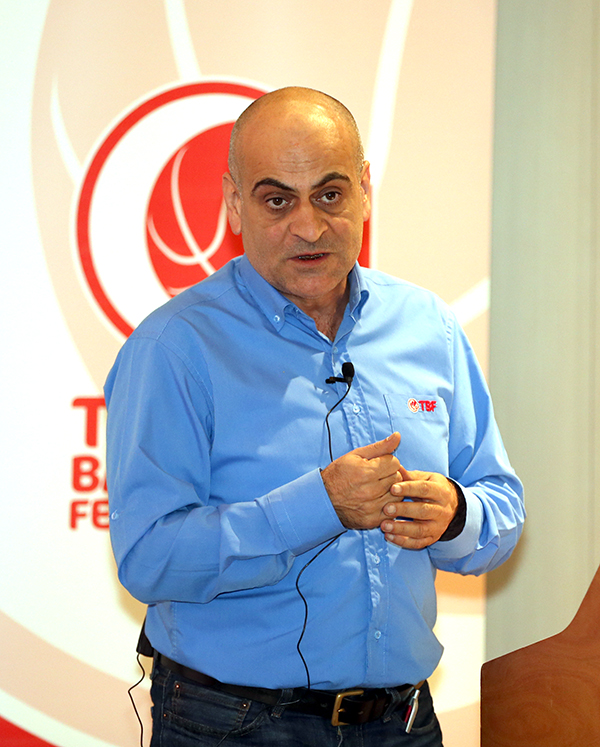
- Ankaralı in 2016
- Born: April 10, 1968 (age 57); Istanbul, Turkey
- Occupation: Basketball Referee
- Spouse: Nukhet
- Children: Ege and Ece

Recep Ankaralı (born April 10, 1968, in Istanbul, Turkey) is a retired professional basketball referee. He started his career in 1989 and retired after 2015- 2016 season. As the end of 2016 season, Ankaralı has officiated more than 1,000 in his career including, Turkish Basketball League, Euroleague, Eurocup, World Championship and Olympics. Recep Ankaralı is currently President of Turkish Basketball Federation Officiating Committee and also Director of Referees for Turkish Basketball Leagues.

Ankaralı has been a part of the officiating crew for Euroleague's most important games, Euroleague Final Four games in 2006, 2008, 2012 and Game 4 of Euroleague's first final series. He was also part of officiating crew for 2014 FIBA Intercontinental Cup Game between Maccabi Tel Aviv and Flamengo. Recep Ankaralı also officiated 8 games in 2012 London Olympics.
