= Rajab, Jalandhar =

Rajab
- Village
- Country: India
- State: Punjab
- District: Jalandhar

Languages
  - Official: Punjabi
- Time zone: UTC+5:30 (IST)
- PIN: 14401

Rajab is a village in Jalandhar district in the Indian state of Punjab.

== About ==
Rajab lies on the Kartarpur-Kala Bakra road; the nearest railway station to Rajab is Kartarpur railway station at a distance of 6 kilometers (3.7 mi).

== Post code ==
Rajab's Post office is Mustafapur.
