= Rexhep Pasha Mati =

Ottoman-Albanian marshal, governor and war minister

Rexhep Mati Pasha
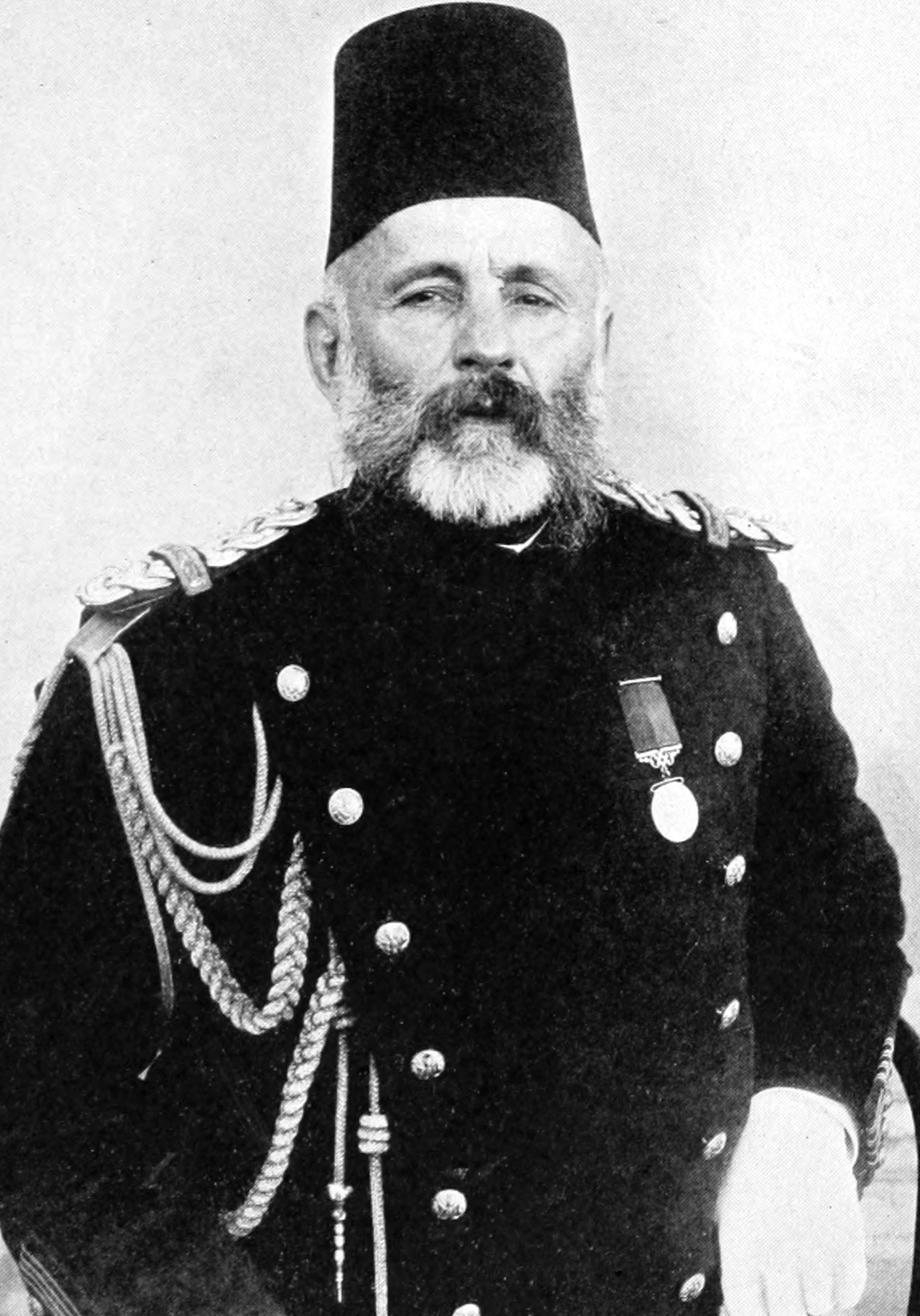
- Born: 1842; Mat region, Ottoman Empire (present-day Albania)
- Died: 14 August 1908 (aged 65–66); Istanbul, Ottoman Empire (present-day Turkey)
- Citizenship: Ottoman
- Occupations: Marshal (müşir), governor (vali), war minister, revolutionary
- Movement: Committee of Union and Progress

Rexhep Pasha Mati (Turkish: Matlı Recep Paşa, Arabic: رجب باشا Rajab Pasha; 1842–1908) was an Ottoman-Albanian marshal, governor and war minister.

== Biography ==
Rexhep Pasha Mati was an Albanian.

While serving in Kerbela (modern Karbala, Iraq), Mati took action against an attack on a Bektashi convert in the town and his efforts were praised by Bektashis.

=== Vali of Tripolitana ===
Abdul Hamid II was aware of Mati's animosity for his government and himself with the Pasha being politically suspect. The sultan appointed Mati in the early 1900s as the Ottoman military commander of the garrison and vali (governor) of Tripoli, a place often reserved for Ottoman political exiles. Mati allowed Ottoman exiles to operate and hold liberal views with the province of Tripolitana gaining a reputation for freedom of speech. He also allowed Ottoman exiles to escape to Europe. Câmi Baykut was Mati's aide-de-camp in Tripoli. Mati opposed the activities of the Italian Bank Banco di Roma operating in Ottoman Libya. Mohamed Fekini, the kaymakam (sub-governor) of Fassatu had been decorated by Mati for repelling a French military incursion into Ottoman Libya back to the Tunisian border. Mati was against religious hatred. The Italian consul of Ottoman Libya tried to force Mati to stop the Isawiyya, a Sufi order from performing the dhikr in 1905 and the Muslim community opposed any prevention. Mati inherited a dispute from the previous governor between the Jewish community and Ottoman government relating to payment of the military exemption tax. Mati continued to insist on payment of the tax and over time through compromise much of amount was reduced.

==== Plot to overthrow Ottoman sultan ====
In 1902, an Ottoman officer Cemil Cahit was sent to Tripolitana and according to him had heard about the patriotism of Mati. He attempted to persuade Mati to declare the constitution yet the commander refused to do so.

Between 1902 and 1903 a coup de detat plot to overthrow Abdulhamid II was devised by the Committee of Union and Progress (CUP). A proposal by Colonel Shevket Bey, a leader of the CUP Tripoli branch was brought before the CUP central committee by Prince Mehmed Sabahaddin. The plan encompassed a coup de detat based on support from Mati. Ahmed Fazlı and Sabahaddin were tasked by the central committee to make a report about the possibility of the venture and after an exchange of letters between them and Shevket Pasha all agreed to meet at Malta. Shevket was sent to Malta by Mati under the pretence of discussions with the Ottoman consul General of Malta to prevent smuggling. As Mati's representative Shevket met with Sabahaddin and Ahmed and informed both that the initial plan was undertake a military expedition in Albania, yet fears of foreign intervention in the area made them choose instead the port of Dedeağaç (modern Alexandroupoli). Troops were then to be transported to Istanbul that could depose the sultan and Mati had agreed to provide soldiers for the venture. At the time Mati was the only Ottoman general to offer his military services to the CUP and it was the main reason that made CUP members want to go through with the plot. Mati was respected by factions within the CUP and also by the British.

The tasks of those involved were Mati and Shevket left in charge of organising the military aspects of the plan along with Ismail Kemal and Sabaheddin given the job of getting diplomatic and financial support to buy two ships for the venture. Kemal also sent an Albanian confidant Xhafer Berxhani from Greece to see Mati in Tripoli. Eqrem Vlora, a member of the Vlora family stated that during this time Mati sent £1000 in gold to Kemal and assisted his son Tahir Pasha in exile at Tripoli to escape to Europe. Later those involved in the plot worked to finalise details of their plan and Reșid Sadi traveled to Tripoli to give Mati £3,000. Kemal was of the view that if Mati captured Selanik (modern Thessaloniki) with part of his army, it would make Albanians join his forces. The failure of the plan was put down to different reasons with Kemal blaming prolonged negotiations about obtaining ships, while Rexhep Pasha viewed Kemal's lukewarm attitude for the venture as reason to change his mind.

In 1904 Mati was involved in a plot where he would generate a military uprising in Tripoli, become the leader of rebels going to Istanbul and force Abdul Hamid II to either reinstate the constitution or renounce the throne.

=== Post Young Turk Revolution and death ===
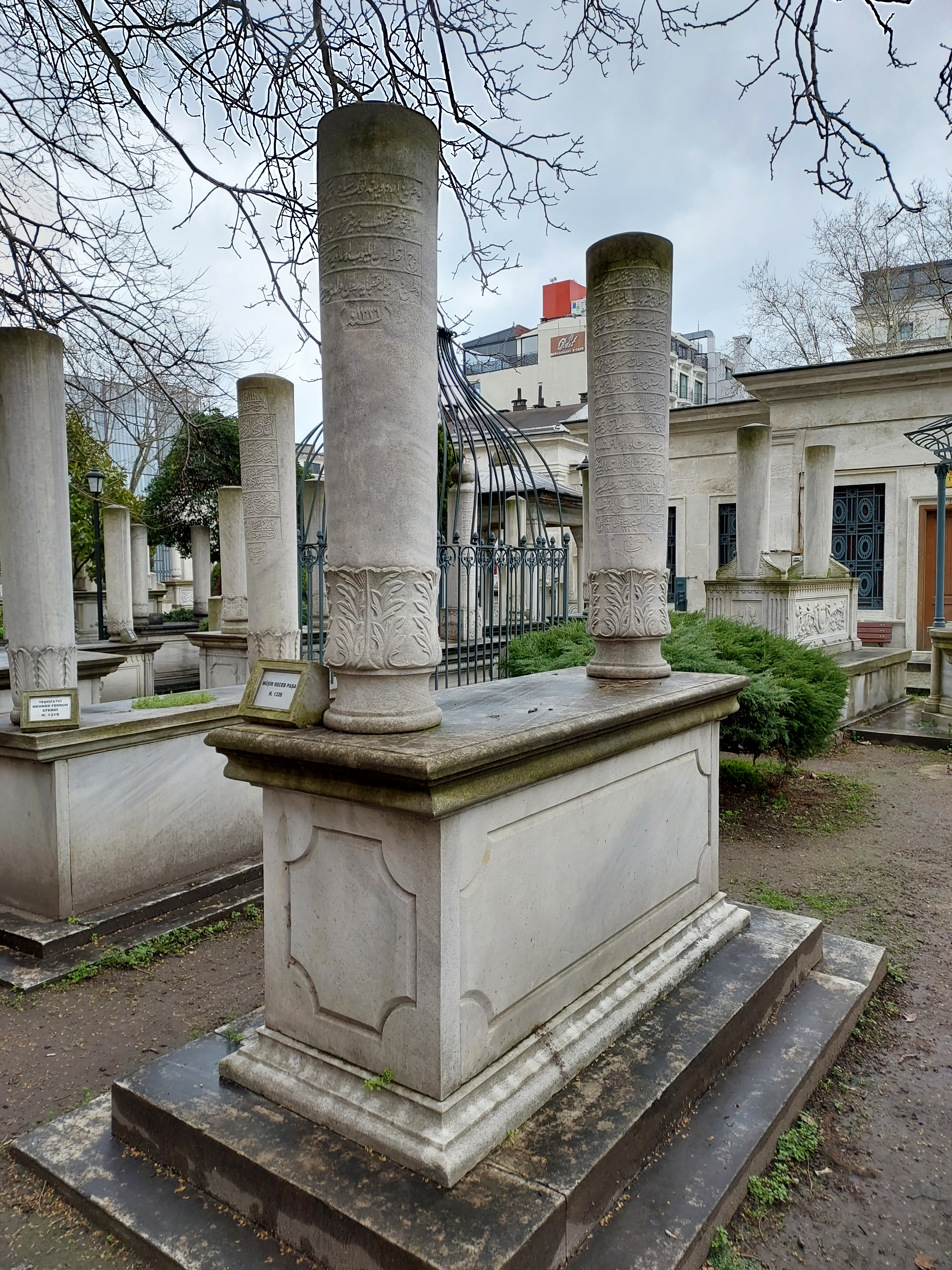
Grave of Rexhep Pasha in the courtyard of the Mausoleum of Sultan Mahmud II

After the Young Turk Revolution (1908), the new Ottoman government installed Mati as the War Minister in Kamil Pasha's cabinet. Prior to leaving for Istanbul, Mati installed the mutasarrıf (sanjak administrator) of Jebel and CUP member Bekir Sami Bey as the new vali of Tripoli. He cancelled the appointment of Bekir Sami due to strong local opposition and Mati later left for Istanbul by ship with 198 CUP exiles. After holding office for a short period of time, Mati died of a heart attack. Rumors of the time claimed that Mati's heart attack was brought about due to the excitement of events he felt following the revolution.

In 1911 Dervish Hima published a book Musaver Arnavud (The Illustrated Albanian) in Ottoman Turkish and it contained content on important Albanians of the time and included a short article about Mati. After the death of Mati some newspaper articles by the CUP portrayed him as "not only a soldier but also a genius of politics". The European press was criticised by Albanian nationalists in newspaper articles for neglecting to mention the ethnic origin of Mati following his death.
