= Farmasi Arena =

Indoor multi-purpose arena in Brazil

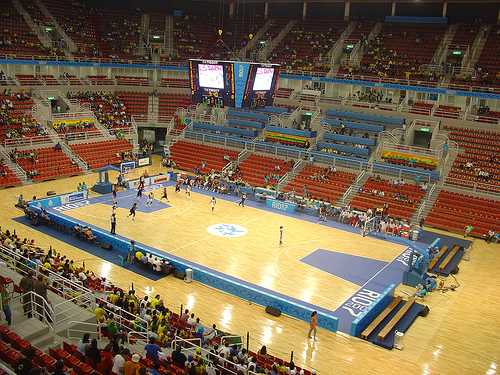
- The then-Arena Olímpica during the 2007 Pan American Games
- Interactive map of Farmasi Arena
- Former names: Arena Olímpica do Rio (2007, 2016); RioArena (2007–2008); HSBC Arena (2007–2016); Jeunesse Arena (2017–2023)
- Address: Av. Embaixador Abelardo Bueno, 3401
- Location: Rio de Janeiro, Brazil
- Coordinates: 22°58′31″S 43°23′25″W
- Owner: Municipality of Rio de Janeiro
- Operator: GL events
- Capacity: Sports events: 15,430; Concerts: 18,768
- Field size: 2,400 m^{2} (26,000 sq ft)
- Public transit: Parque Olímpico

Construction
- Groundbreaking: November 2005
- Opened: July 2007
- Years active: 2007–present
- Cost: R$ 126 million (US$ 64,700,000)

Tenant
- Flamengo Basketball (some matches) (NBB) (2009–present)

Website
- farmasiarena.com.br

Farmasi Arena is an indoor multipurpose arena, located in the region of Barra da Tijuca, in Rio de Janeiro, Brazil. It is one of the indoor arena with largest capacity in the country, with 15,430 people for sports and up to 18,768 for concerts.

The arena is named for the Turkish cosmetics company Farmasi through a naming rights deal closed in 2024. Priorly, the arena was sponsored by the American cosmetics company Jeunesse Global from 2017 to 2023, and British bank HSBC. The arena was completed in July 2007 and was first known as Arena Olímpica do Rio (Rio Olympic Arena), which it was known as during the 2016 Summer Olympics. From December 2007 to March 2008, plus the months between Jeunesse's deal expiring and Farmasi taking over, it was known as RioArena.

== Sports ==
The arena was built to host basketball and gymnastics during the 2007 Pan American Games. In December 2007, it started being operated by GL events, who also operates the nearby Riocentro Convention Center and the Riocentro Sports Complex, and started hosting many concerts from a variety of artists. It has also hosted the UNESCO teleton, Criança Esperança, after 2008, replacing Ginásio do Ibirapuera in São Paulo as the main venue. Starting on 29 March 2008, it was renamed as the HSBC Arena, as part of a naming rights agreement with the bank.

The arena hosted UFC's first event in Brazil in thirteen years, UFC 134: Silva vs. Okami, which took place on August 27, 2011. Nine other UFC events have since been held in the arena: UFC 142: Aldo vs. Mendes, on January 14, 2012; UFC 153: Silva vs. Bonnar, on October 13, 2012; UFC 163: Aldo vs. Korean Zombie on August 3, 2013; UFC 190: Rousey vs. Correia, on August 1, 2015; UFC 212: Aldo vs. Holloway, on June 3, 2017; UFC 224: Nunes vs. Pennington, on May 12, 2018; UFC 237: Namajunas vs. Andrade, on May 11, 2019; UFC 283: Teixeira vs. Hill, on January 21, 2023; UFC 301: Pantoja vs. Erceg, on May 4. 2024 and UFC Fight Night: Oliveira vs. Gamrot, on October 11, 2025.

An NBA game between the Chicago Bulls and the Washington Wizards was also held at HSBC Arena in 2013. The arena also hosted the 2014 edition of the FIBA Intercontinental Cup between Flamengo and Maccabi Tel Aviv. The NBA also hosted a preseason game between the Cleveland Cavaliers and the Miami Heat on 11 October 2014, as part of the NBA Global Games.

The venue hosted gymnastics during the 2016 Summer Olympics, and wheelchair basketball during the 2016 Summer Paralympics.

In 2017, the arena hosted the 2017 League of Legends Mid-Season Invitational.

In November 2018, the arena hosted the Tom Clancy's Rainbow Six Siege Season 8 Pro League finals.

In November 2022, the arena hosted the Champions Stage of the IEM Rio Major 2022, the eighteenth Counter-Strike: Global Offensive (CS:GO) Major Championship. The Major was the first held in Brazil and the first held in South America for CS:GO.

In 2026, the arena hosted the Davis Cup Group I confrontation between Brazil and Switzerland.

== Concerts ==
Queen + Paul Rodgers concluded their Rock the Cosmos Tour at the arena on 29 November 2008. Demi Lovato performed at the arena for her South American Tour 2010 on May 27, 2010. Miley Cyrus performed at the arena for her Gypsy Heart Tour on May 13, 2011, and it was Cyrus' first concert in Brazil.

On March 27, 2011, Iron Maiden's performance at the arena had to be postponed to the following night after a security barrier collapsed during the opening song. The entire audience was allowed to attend the following night's show, although those who could not attend were given a refund.

Other stars like Beyoncé, Amy Winehouse, Now United, Ariana Grande, Green Day, Ed Sheeran, Paul McCartney, Eric Clapton, Elton John, Radiohead, Niall Horan, Harry Styles, Louis Tomlinson and Twenty One Pilots performed at the venue.

== Performers ==
| Country | Artist | Tour | Date |
|---|---|---|---|
| (United Kingdom) (United States) | Ozzy Osbourne, Korn, Black Label Society | Black Rain Tour | 3 April 2008 |
| (Mexico) | RBD | Empezar Desde Cero Tour | 9 May 2008 |
| (United States) | Maroon 5 | It Won't Be Soon Before Long Tour | 7 November 2008 |
| (United States) | R.E.M. | Accelerate World Tour | 8 November 2008 |
| (Mexico) | RBD | Tour del Adiós | 28 November 2008 |
| (United Kingdom) | Queen, Paul Rodgers | Rock the Cosmos Tour | 29 November 2008 |
| (Canada) | Alanis Morissette | Flavors of Entanglement Tour | 4 February 2009 |
| (Italy) | Andrea Bocelli | | 18 April 2009 |
| (United States) | Beyoncé | I Am... | 7, 8 February 2010 |
| (United States) | Green Day | 21st Century Breakdown World Tour | 15 October 2010 |
| (United Kingdom) | Amy Winehouse | | 10, 11 January 2011 |
| (United Kingdom) | Iron Maiden | The Final Frontier World Tour | 28 March 2011 |
| (United States) | Miley Cyrus | Gypsy Heart Tour | 13 May 2011 |
| (United Kingdom) | Sade | Sade Live | 22 October 2011 |
| (United States) | Selena Gomez | We Own the Night Tour | 4 February 2012 |
| (United States) (Brazil) | Jennifer Lopez, Ivete Sangalo | Dance Again World Tour | 27 June 2012 |
| (United States) | Maroon 5 | Overexposed Tour | 25 August 2012 |
| (United States) | Evanescence, The Used | Evanescence Tour | 6 October 2012 |
| (United States) | Kiss, Mötley Crüe | The Tour | 18 November 2012 |
| (United Kingdom) | The Cure | | 4 April 2013 |
| (United States) | Paramore | Self-Titled Tour | 25 July 2013 |
| (Brazil) | Anitta | Turnê Show das Poderosas | 15 February 2014 |
| (United Kingdom) | Elton John | The Diving Board Tour | 19 February 2014 |
| (United States) | Avenged Sevenfold | Hail to the King Tour | 14 March 2014 |
| (United States) | Guns N' Roses | Appetite for Democracy | 20 March 2014 |
| (South Korea) (United States) | Shinee, B.A.P, MBLAQ, CNBLUE, Ailee | Music Bank World Tour | 7 June 2014 |
| (United Kingdom) | Arctic Monkeys | AM Tour | 15 November 2014 |
| (United Kingdom) | Ed Sheeran | x Tour | 30 April 2015 |
| (Argentina) | Violetta | Violetta Live | 30 June 2015 |
| (United Kingdom) | Muse | Drones World Tour | 22 October 2015 |
| (United Kingdom) | Iron Maiden | The Book of Souls World Tour | 17 March 2016 |
| (United States) | Ariana Grande | Dangerous Woman Tour | 29 June 2017 |
| (United Kingdom) | Radiohead | | 20 April 2018 |
| (United Kingdom) | Ozzy Osbourne | No More Tours II | 20 May 2018 |
| (United Kingdom) | Arctic Monkeys | Tranquility Base Hotel & Casino Tour | 3 April 2019 |
| (Canada) | Shawn Mendes | Shawn Mendes: The Tour | 3 December 2019 |
| (United States) | Backstreet Boys | DNA World Tour | 13 March 2020 |
| (United States) | Now United | Wave Your Flag World Tour | 24 March 2022 |
| (United Kingdom) | Harry Styles | Love On Tour | 8 December 2022 |
| (United Kingdom) | Arctic Monkeys | The Car Tour | 4 November 2022 |
| (United States) (United Kingdom) | Slipknot, Bring Me the Horizon | | 15 December 2022 |
| (United States) | Imagine Dragons | Mercury World Tour | 4 March 2023 |
| (United States) | Alicia Keys | Alicia + Keys World Tour | 3 May 2023 |
| (United Kingdom) | Louis Tomlinson | Faith in the Future World Tour | 8 May 2024 |
| (United Kingdom) | Simply Red | | 12 March 2024 |
| (United States) | Fall Out Boy, Yellowcard | So Much For (Tour) Dust | 27 August 2024 |
| (United States) | Twenty One Pilots | The Clancy World Tour | 24 January 2025 |
| (United States) | Christina Aguilera | | 6 February 2025 |
| (United Kingdom) | Dua Lipa | Radical Optimism Tour | 22 November 2025 |
| (China) | Jackson Wang | Magic Man 2 World Tour | 25 April 2026 |
| (Spain) | Rosalía | Lux Tour | 10, 11 August 2026 |

== Gallery ==
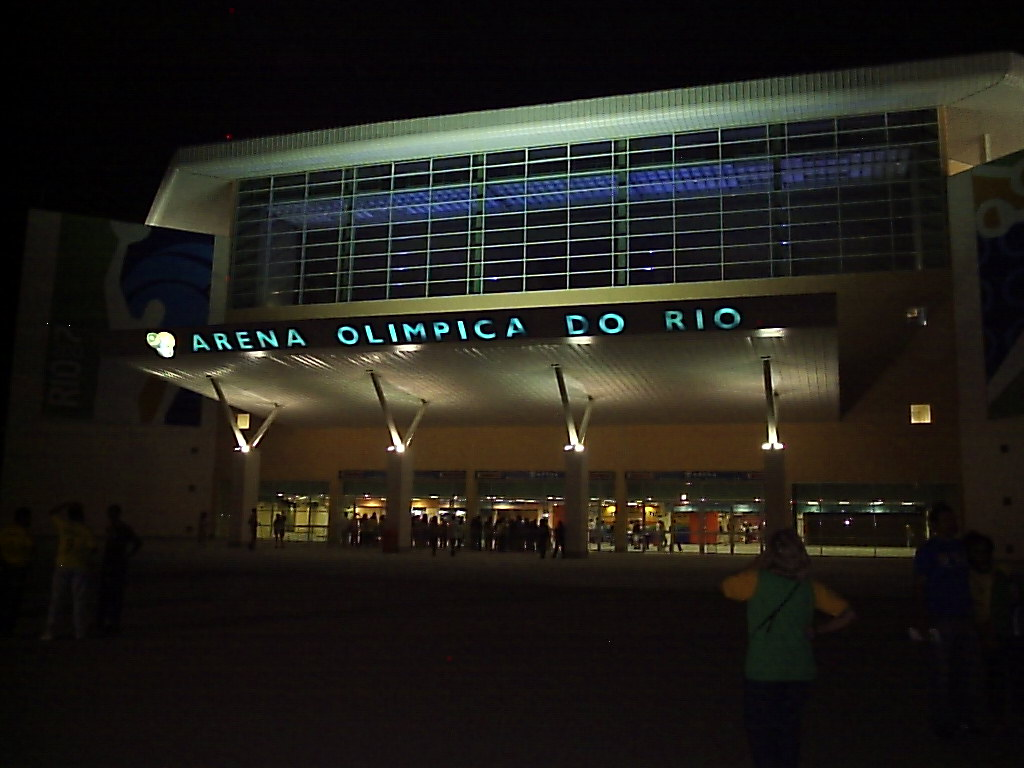
HSBC Arena facade, during the 2007 Pan American Games

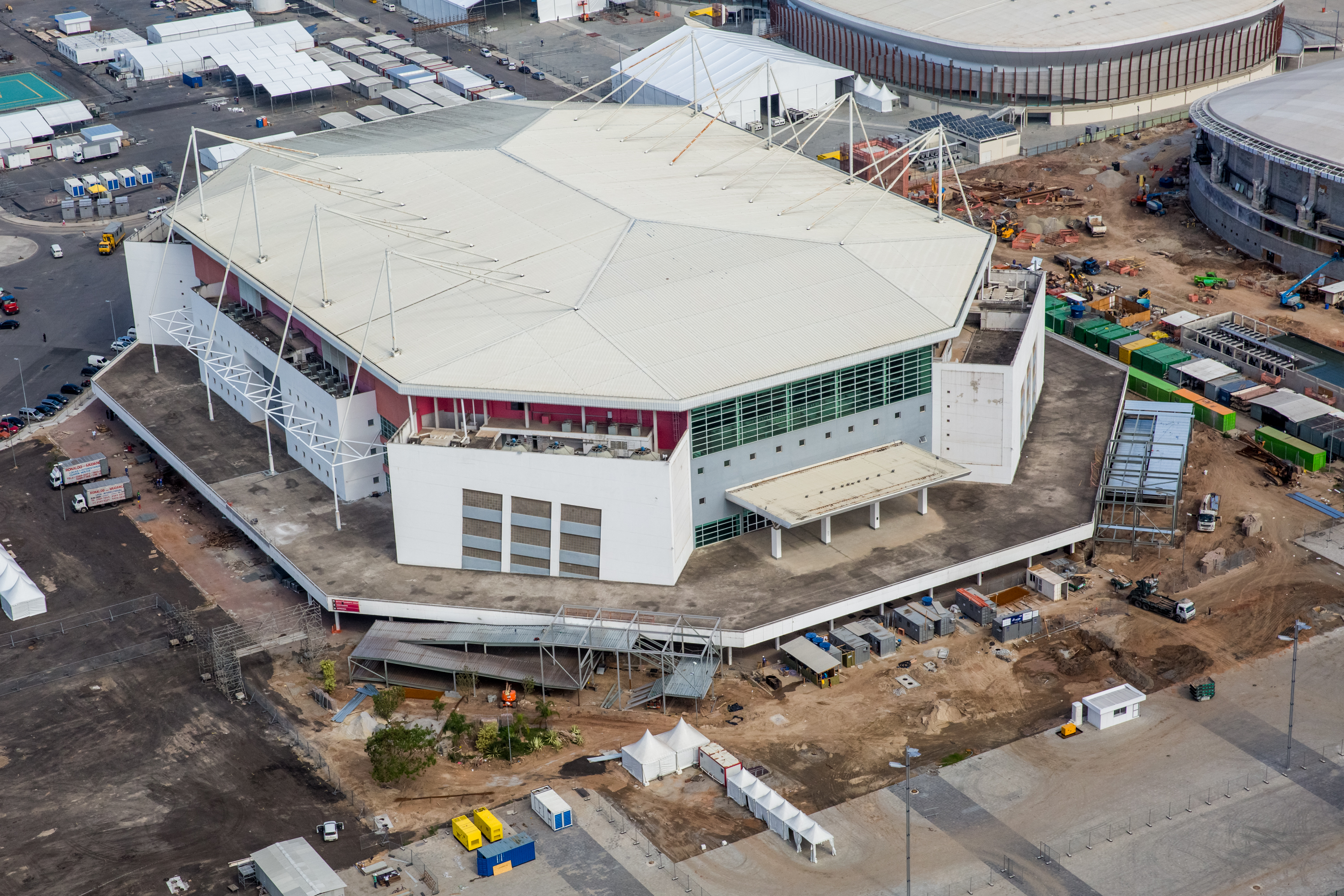
Aerial picture of the arena in 2016.

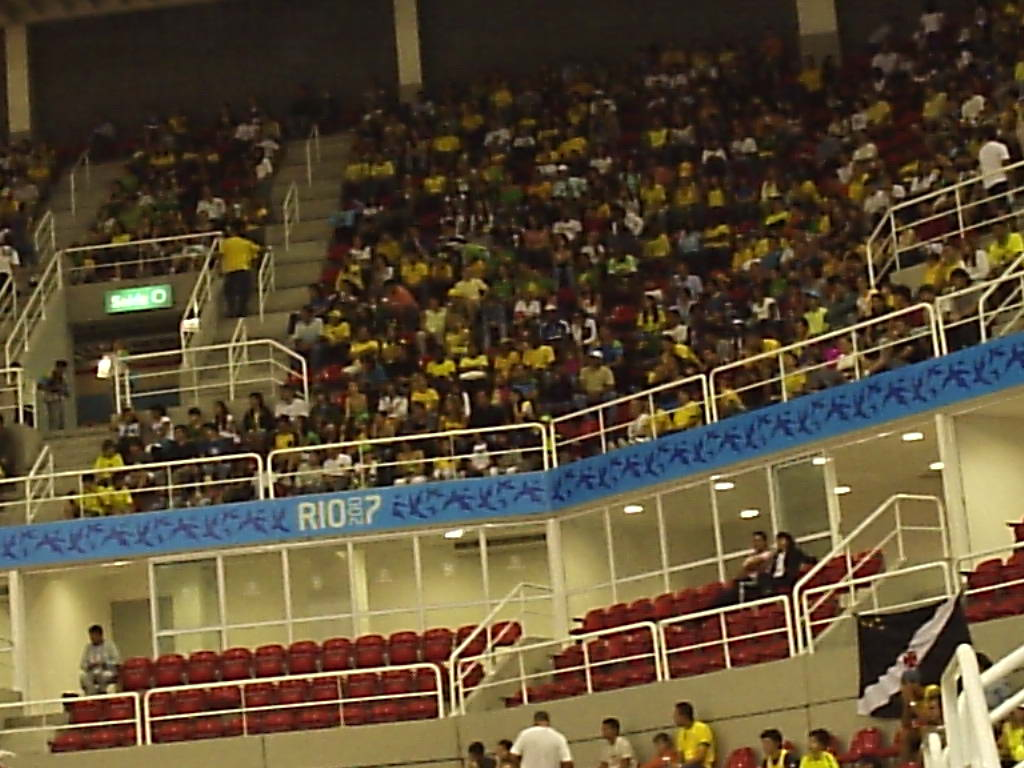
Inside the HSBC Arena, in a men's basketball game at the 2007 Pan American Games

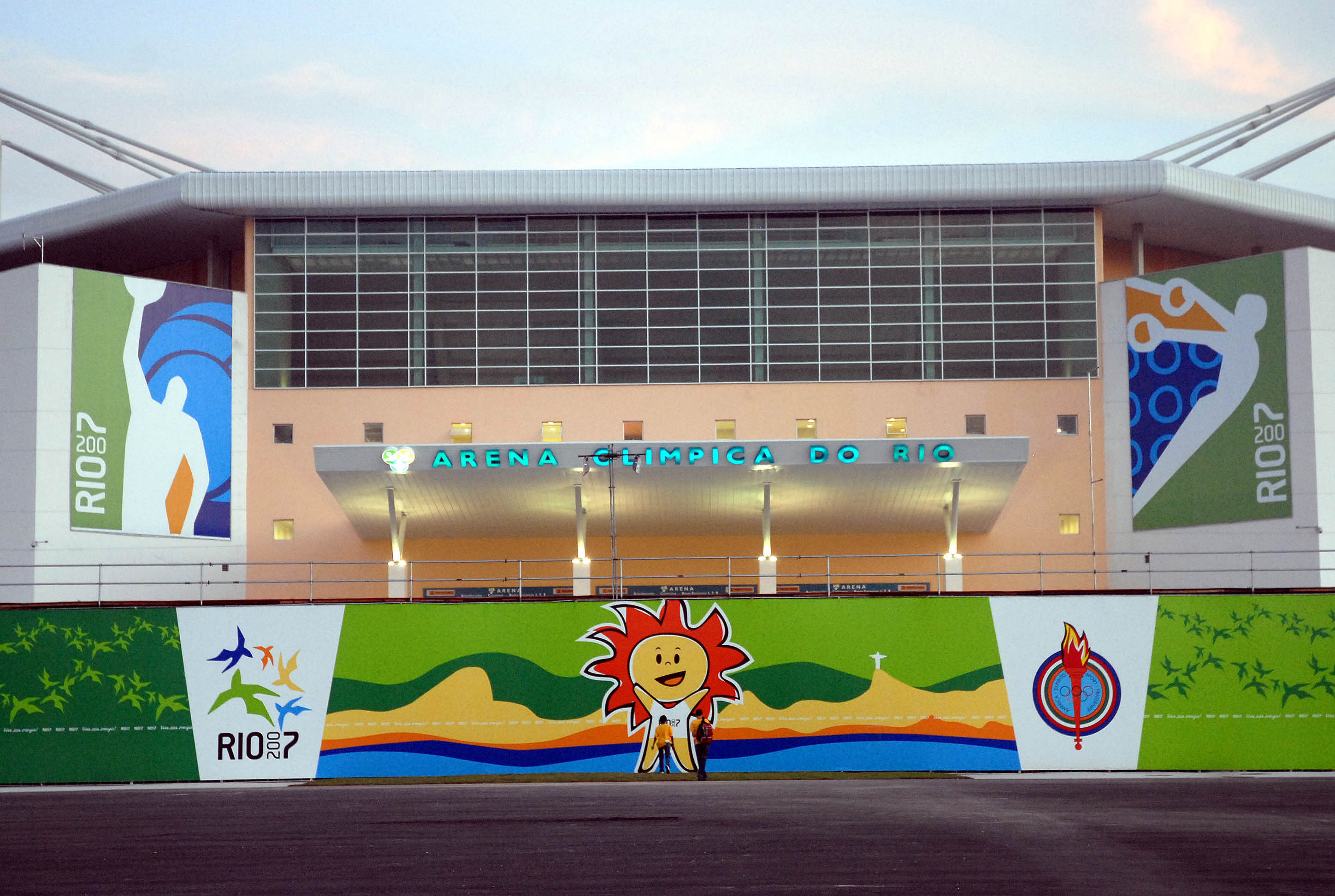
2007 Pan American Games

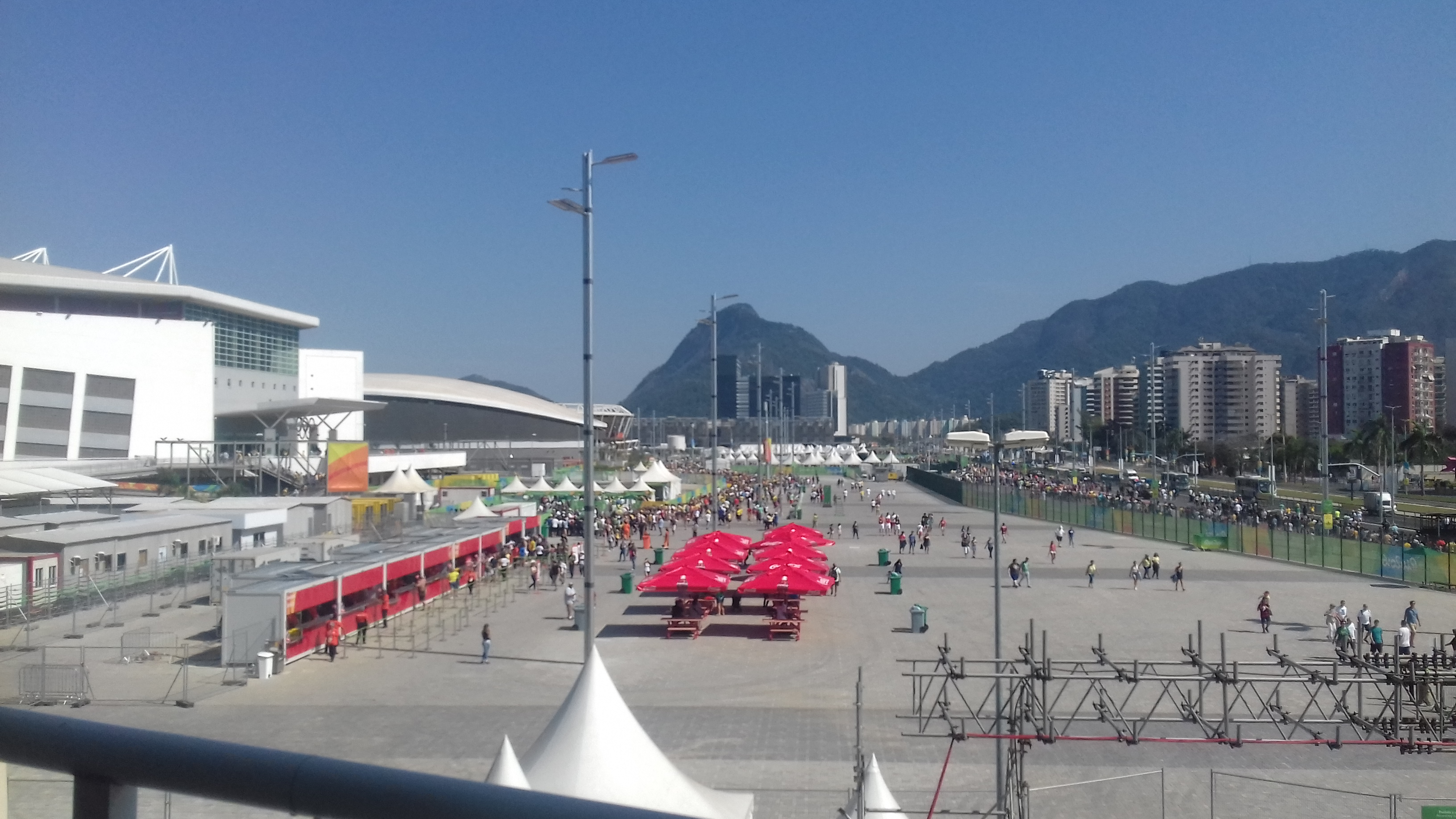
Outside the Arena during the 2016 Summer Paralympics

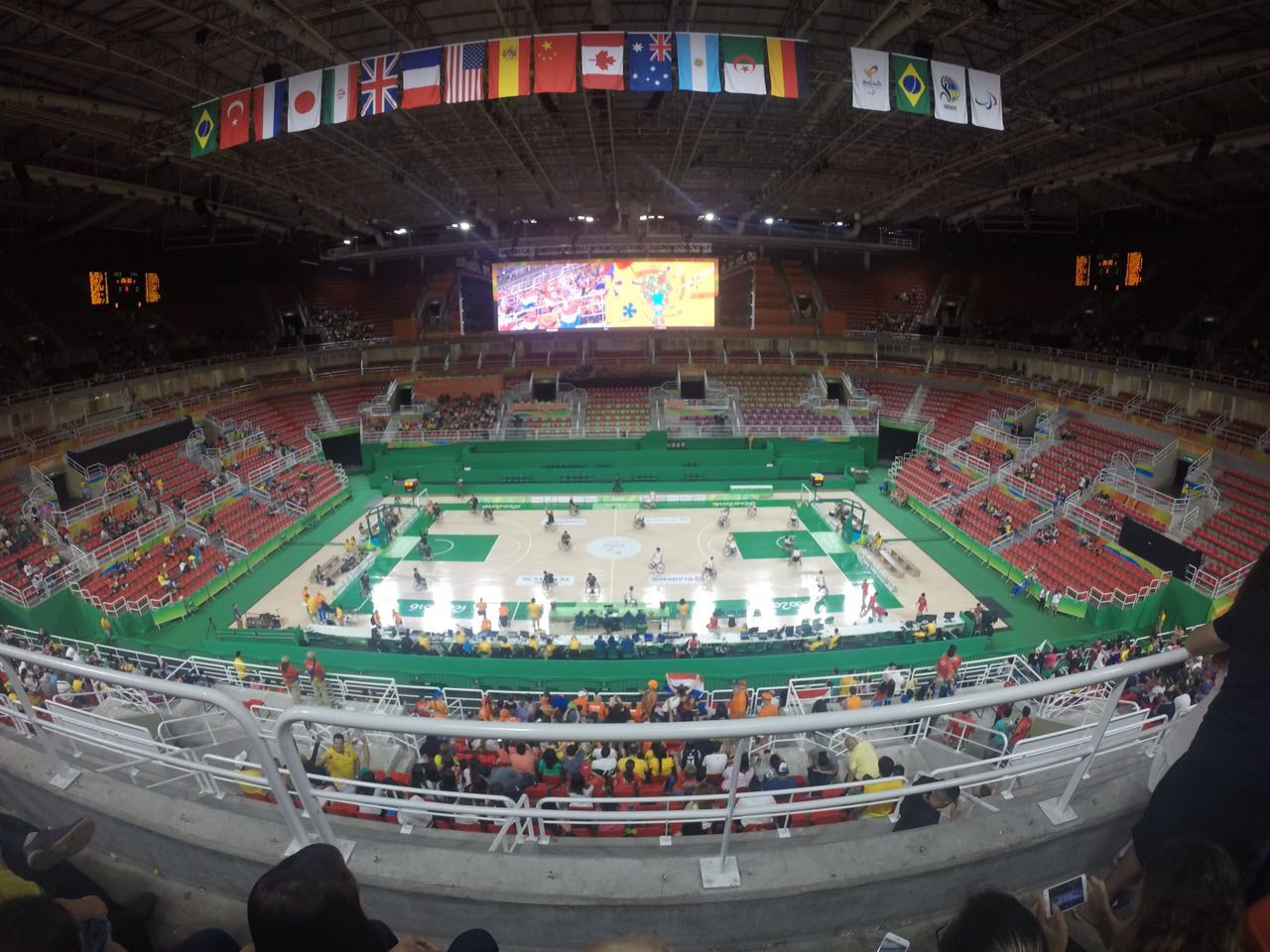
2016 Summer Paralympics wheelchair basketball games

== See also ==
- List of indoor arenas in Brazil

Events and tenants
| Preceded by Ginásio José Corrêa; Barueri, São Paulo | FIBA Intercontinental Cup; Final Venue; 2014 | Succeeded by Ginásio do Ibirapuera; São Paulo |
