= 2014 FIBA Americas League =

FIBA Americas League
- Duration: January 24, 2014 – March 22, 2014

Finals
- Champions: (Brazil) Flamengo (1st title)
- Runners-up: (Brazil) E.C. Pinheiros
- Third place: (Uruguay) Atlético Aguada
- Fourth place: (Mexico) Halcones de Xalapa
- Grand Final MVP: Marcelinho Machado

Statistical leaders
Points	(Uruguay) Leandro Morales	28.3
Rebounds	(Mexico) Lorenzo Mata	11.7
Assists	(Argentina) Nicolás Laprovíttola	6.3

The 2014 FIBA Americas League was played between January and March, 2014. It was the 7th edition of the first-tier and most important professional international club basketball competition in the regions of South America, Central America, the Caribbean, and Mexico, with the winner of the competition being crowned as the best team and champion of all of those regions.

== Groups ==
=== Group A ===
Team	W	L	Pts	PF	PA
(Venezuela) Cocodrilos de Caracas	3	0	6	274	259
(Brazil) Esporte Clube Pinheiros	2	1	5	267	246
(Mexico) Toros de Nuevo Laredo	1	2	4	236	246
(Colombia) Bambuqueros Neiva	0	3	3	254	280

=== Group B ===
Team	W	L	Pts	PF	PA
(Uruguay) Club Atlético Aguada	3	0	6	273	237
(Brazil) Unitri/Uberlândia	2	1	5	227	231
(Puerto Rico) Leones de Ponce	1	2	4	263	251
(Argentina) Club Atlético Lanús	0	3	3	210	254

=== Group C ===
Team	W	L	Pts	PF	PA
(Argentina) Regatas Corrientes	2	1	5	257	236
(Mexico) Halcones de Xalapa	2	1	5	229	230
(Brazil) Brasília	1	2	4	256	255
(Venezuela) Marinos de Anzoátegui	1	2	4	258	279

=== Group D ===
Team	W	L	Pts	PF	PA
(Brazil) Flamengo	3	0	6	348	275
(Puerto Rico) Capitanes de Arecibo	2	1	5	289	299
(Chile) Leones de Quilpué	1	2	4	270	310
(Ecuador) Mavort	0	3	3	281	304

== Semifinals ==
=== Group E ===
Team	W	L	Pts	PF	PA
(Brazil) Flamengo	3	0	6	267	211
(Mexico) Halcones de Xalapa	2	1	5	219	220
(Brazil) Unitri/Uberlândia	1	2	4	246	247
(Venezuela) Cocodrilos de Caracas	0	3	3	208	262

=== Group F ===
Team	W	L	Pts	PF	PA
(Brazil) Esporte Clube Pinheiros	3	0	6	264	251
(Uruguay) Club Atlético Aguada	2	1	5	230	235
(Argentina) Regatas Corrientes	1	2	4	254	245
(Puerto Rico) Capitanes de Arecibo	0	3	3	249	266

== Final 4 ==
Semifinals; 21 March 2014
(Brazil) Flamengo	113
(Uruguay) Club Atlético Aguada	81
(Brazil) Esporte Clube Pinheiros	85
(Mexico) Halcones de Xalapa	72

Grand Final; 22 March 2014
(Brazil) Flamengo	85
(Brazil) Esporte Clube Pinheiros	78
Third-place game
(Uruguay) Club Atlético Aguada	113
(Mexico) Halcones de Xalapa	108
