= Kemerer =

Kemerer may refer to:

- Annie S. Kemerer (1865–1951), American art collector
- Benjamin Tibbets Kemerer (1874–1960), American Episcopalian bishop
- Kemerer Museum of Decorative Arts, a decorative arts museum in Bethlehem, Pennsylvania, United States, founded by Annie S. Kemerer

== See also ==
- Kemer (disambiguation)
- Kemmerer (disambiguation)
