= 2023 FIBA Women's AmeriCup squads =

This article displays the rosters for the teams competing at the 2023 FIBA Women's AmeriCup. Each team had to submit 12 players.

== Group A ==
=== Argentina ===
A 14-player squad was announced on 1 June. The final squad was revealed on 1 July.

Argentina women's national basketball team roster
Players
Coaches

Pos.	No.	Name	Age – Date of birth	Height	Club	Ctr.
PG	2	Macarena D´urso	31 – 16 December 1991	1.62 m (5 ft 4 in)	Club Atlético Aguada	(Uruguay)
C	3	Julieta Mungo	25 – 6 August 1997	1.81 m (5 ft 11 in)	Quimsa	(Argentina)
SG	5	Agustina García	27 – 14 June 1996	1.78 m (5 ft 10 in)	Club Universitario San Simon	(Argentina)
SF	8	Andrea Boquete	32 – 24 September 1990	1.80 m (5 ft 11 in)	Quimsa	(Argentina)
C	9	Celia Fiorotto	31 – 2 June 1992	1.84 m (6 ft 0 in)	Quimsa	(Argentina)
C	10	Agostina Burani	31 – 4 October 1991	1.86 m (6 ft 1 in)	Araski AES	(Spain)
PG	11	Melisa Gretter	30 – 24 January 1993	1.67 m (5 ft 6 in)	CB Estudiantes	(Spain)
SF	13	Candela Gentinetta	22 – 18 March 2001	1.81 m (5 ft 11 in)	Club Deportivo Berazategui	(Argentina)
SG	14	Florencia Chagas	22 – 27 June 2001	1.80 m (5 ft 11 in)	Araski AES	(Spain)
SG	20	Camila Suárez	22 – 12 July 2000	1.78 m (5 ft 10 in)	Obras Sanitarias	(Argentina)
F	27	Magali Vilches	21 – 1 June 2002	1.82 m (6 ft 0 in)	Força Lleida	(Spain)
C	55	Brenda Fontana	22 – 3 May 2001	1.85 m (6 ft 1 in)	UTEP Miners	(United States)

Head coach

- (Argentina) Gregorio Martínez

Assistant coach(es)

- (Argentina) Federico Fernández
- (Argentina) Ignacio Navazo

Legend

- Club – describes last
  club before the tournament
- Age – describes age
  on 1 July 2023

=== Brazil ===
A 19-player squad were announced on 31 May. The final roster was revealed on 30 June.

Brazil women's national basketball team roster
Players
Coaches

Pos.	No.	Name	Age – Date of birth	Height	Club	Ctr.
SG	3	Isabela Ramona	29 – 23 January 1994	1.80 m (5 ft 11 in)	BC Samara	(Russia)
G	4	Gabriella D'Arrigo	24 – 9 October 1998	1.74 m (5 ft 9 in)	SESI Araraquara	(Brazil)
F	5	Rapha Monteiro	28 – 28 January 1995	1.81 m (5 ft 11 in)	Sampaio Basquete	(Brazil)
PF	6	Sassá Gonçalves	28 – 20 August 1994	1.80 m (5 ft 11 in)	APABA	(Brazil)
G	8	Tainá Paixão	31 – 29 November 1991	1.73 m (5 ft 8 in)	Sampaio Basquete	(Brazil)
C	10	Kamilla Cardoso	22 – 30 April 2001	2.04 m (6 ft 8 in)	South Carolina Gamecocks	(United States)
PF	12	Damiris Dantas	30 – 17 November 1992	1.92 m (6 ft 4 in)	Fuerza Regia de Monterrey	(Mexico)
C	14	Érika de Souza	41 – 9 March 1982	1.97 m (6 ft 6 in)	Sampaio Basquete	(Brazil)
PF	15	Aline Moura	25 – 4 July 1997	1.85 m (6 ft 1 in)	SESI Araraquara	(Brazil)
PG	18	Débora Costa	31 – 12 August 1991	1.64 m (5 ft 5 in)	SESI Araraquara	(Brazil)
PF	23	Emanuely de Oliveira	23 – 11 December 1999	1.80 m (5 ft 11 in)	Sampaio Basquete	(Brazil)
PG	24	Alana Gonçalo	28 – 23 September 1994	1.66 m (5 ft 5 in)	Sampaio Basquete	(Brazil)

Head coach

- (Brazil) José Neto

Assistant coach(es)

- (Brazil) João Camargo
- (Brazil) Virgil López

Legend

- Club – describes last
  club before the tournament
- Age – describes age
  on 1 July 2023

=== Cuba ===
Cuba women's national basketball team roster
Players
Coaches

Pos.	No.	Name	Age – Date of birth	Height	Club	Ctr.
G	9	Yamara Amargo	38 – 28 June 1985	1.80 m (5 ft 11 in)	Santi Espiritu	(Cuba)
SF	10	Bexy Claro	21 – 5 October 2001	1.93 m (6 ft 4 in)	Santiago De Cuba	(Cuba)
PG	11	María Montero	24 – 3 November 1998	1.75 m (5 ft 9 in)	Guantánamo CB	(Cuba)
C	12	Nahomis Vargas	19 – 23 August 2003	1.85 m (6 ft 1 in)	CRC Quinta dos Lombos	(Portugal)
PF	17	Isabela Jourdain	19 – 28 November 2003	1.88 m (6 ft 2 in)	Clube Propaganda Natação	(Portugal)
PF	22	Melissa Despaigne	20 – 11 October 2002	1.89 m (6 ft 2 in)	Santiago De Cuba	(Cuba)
F	24	Suanly Tanis	28 – 13 December 1994	1.78 m (5 ft 10 in)	Santiago De Cuba	(Cuba)
G	30	Elianis Armentero	23 – 2 January 2000	1.75 m (5 ft 9 in)	Capitalinos de La Habana	(Cuba)
G	32	Betsy Guilarte	20 – 10 February 2003	1.86 m (6 ft 1 in)
G	55	Dairis Tornell	31 – 18 April 1992	1.76 m (5 ft 9 in)	Capitalinos de La Habana	(Cuba)
C	80	Enriqueta Neyra	26 – 3 January 1997	1.87 m (6 ft 2 in)	Santi Espiritu	(Cuba)
C	87	Rachel Contreras	23 – 23 July 1999	1.84 m (6 ft 0 in)	Ciego de Ávila	(Cuba)

Head coach

- (Cuba) Margarito Pedroso

Assistant coach(es)

- (Cuba) Ernesto Wright

Legend

- Club – describes last
  club before the tournament
- Age – describes age
  on 1 July 2023

=== United States ===
Eight players were announced on 14 May. The final squad was revealed on 23 June.

United States women's national basketball team – 2023 FIBA Women's AmeriCup roster
Players
Coaches

Pos.	No.	Name	Age – Date of birth	Height	Club
G	4	Raven Johnson	22 – 4 March 2001	1.73 m (5 ft 8 in)	South Carolina Gamecocks	(United States)
G	5	Jewel Spear	21 – 25 February 2002	1.78 m (5 ft 10 in)	Tennessee Lady Volunteers	(United States)
G	6	Laila Phelia	20 – 28 December 2002	1.83 m (6 ft 0 in)	Michigan Wolverines	(United States)
F	7	Rickea Jackson	22 – 16 March 2001	1.88 m (6 ft 2 in)	Tennessee Lady Volunteers	(United States)
G	8	Chance Gray	18 – 6 July 2004	1.75 m (5 ft 9 in)	Oregon Ducks	(United States)
G	9	Deja Kelly	21 – 8 September 2001	1.73 m (5 ft 8 in)	North Carolina Tar Heels	(United States)
F	10	Angel Reese	21 – 6 May 2002	1.90 m (6 ft 3 in)	LSU Tigers	(United States)
G	11	Charisma Osborne	21 – 3 July 2001	1.73 m (5 ft 8 in)	UCLA Bruins	(United States)
G	12	Abbey Hsu	22 – 22 March 2001	1.80 m (5 ft 11 in)	Columbia Lions	(United States)
F	13	Rayah Marshall	19 – 15 November 2003	1.93 m (6 ft 4 in)	USC Trojans	(United States)
F	14	Janiah Barker	19 – 8 November 2003	1.90 m (6 ft 3 in)	Texas A&M Aggies	(United States)
C	15	Lauren Betts	19 – 15 October 2003	2.01 m (6 ft 7 in)	UCLA Bruins	(United States)

Head coach

- (United States) Kamie Ethridge

Assistant coach(es)

- (United States) Aaron Johnston
- (United States) Katrina Merriweather

Legend

- Club – describes last
  club before the tournament
- Age – describes age
  on 1 July 2023

=== Venezuela ===
A 27-player squad was announced on 1 June. The final roster was revealed on 29 June.

Venezuela women's national basketball team roster
Players
Coaches

Pos.	No.	Name	Age – Date of birth	Height	Club	Ctr.
SF	2	Genesis Rivera	27 – 6 February 1996	1.78 m (5 ft 10 in)	Club Atlético Aguada	(Uruguay)
PG	3	Barbara Pico	21 – 20 January 2002	1.72 m (5 ft 8 in)	Pastoras de Lara	(Venezuela)
SF	6	Yosimar Corrales	33 – 5 February 1990	1.81 m (5 ft 11 in)	Cayenas de Carabobo	(Venezuela)
G	7	Guadalupe Díaz	23 – 7 December 1999	1.68 m (5 ft 6 in)	Taurinas de Girardot	(Colombia)
SF	8	Ivaney Marquez	40 – 17 March 1983	1.81 m (5 ft 11 in)	Cayenas de Carabobo	(Uruguay)
SF	9	Daniela Wallen	28 – 4 April 1995	1.79 m (5 ft 10 in)	Keflavík	(Iceland)
PG	11	Mariana Durán	30 – 12 May 1993	1.72 m (5 ft 8 in)	Basket 2000	(Italy)
SG	13	Jormelys Urbina	26 – 9 July 1996	1.71 m (5 ft 7 in)	Caribeñas de Caracas	(Venezuela)
PG	14	Waleska Pérez	29 – 17 February 1994	1.81 m (5 ft 11 in)	Abejas de León Femenil	(Mexico)
PF	19	Leudys Quevedo	24 – 3 July 1998	1.83 m (6 ft 0 in)	Cayenas de Carabobo	(Venezuela)
C	22	Aguehil Fajardo	23 – 6 October 1999	1.84 m (6 ft 0 in)	Esgueira Basket	(Portugal)
C	25	Yolimar Martínez	28 – 30 January 1995	1.84 m (6 ft 0 in)	Capitalinas Distrito Capital	(Venezuela)

Head coach

- (Venezuela) Eduardo Pinto

Assistant coach(es)

- (Venezuela) José Gallardo
- (Venezuela) Luz Vargas

Legend

- Club – describes last
  club before the tournament
- Age – describes age
  on 1 July 2023

== Group B ==
=== Canada ===
The squad was announced on 26 June 2023.

Canada women's national basketball team roster
Players
Coaches

Pos.	No.	Name	Age – Date of birth	Height	Club	Ctr.
G	1	Aislinn Konig	25 – 20 May 1998	1.75 m (5 ft 9 in)	UCAM Jairis Alcantarilla	(Spain)
G	2	Shay Colley	27 – 1 June 1996	1.76 m (5 ft 9 in)	Flammes Carolo Basket	(France)
SF	3	Merissah Russell	21 – 3 March 2002	1.80 m (5 ft 11 in)	Louisville Cardinals	(United States)
G	4	Sami Hill	28 – 22 November 1994	1.78 m (5 ft 10 in)	Araski AES	(Spain)
SF	8	Cassandre Prosper	18 – 25 June 2005	1.88 m (6 ft 2 in)	Notre Dame Fighting Irish	(United States)
PF	9	Yvonne Ejim	21 – 9 April 2002	1.82 m (6 ft 0 in)	Gonzaga Bulldogs	(United States)
C	10	Emily Potter	27 – 10 October 1995	1.96 m (6 ft 5 in)	Perth Lynx	(Australia)
G	12	Syla Swords	17 – 28 January 2006	1.82 m (6 ft 0 in)	Long Island Lutheran HS	(United States)
C	14	Kayla Alexander	32 – 5 January 1991	1.93 m (6 ft 4 in)	Tango Bourges Basket	(France)
G	21	Nirra Fields	29 – 3 December 1993	1.76 m (5 ft 9 in)	Emlak Konut SK	(Turkey)
F	24	Aaliyah Edwards	20 – 9 July 2002	1.91 m (6 ft 3 in)	UConn Huskies	(United States)
SG	30	Taya Hanson	23 – 14 June 2000	1.78 m (5 ft 10 in)	TKH Basketball	(Germany)

Head coach

- (Spain) Víctor Lapeña

Assistant coach(es)

- (Canada) Steve Baur
- (United States) Murriel Page
- (Canada) Tamara Tatham

Legend

- Club – describes last
  club before the tournament
- Age – describes age
  on 1 July 2023

=== Colombia ===
The squad was announced on 29 June.

Colombia women's national basketball team roster
Players
Coaches

Pos.	No.	Name	Age – Date of birth	Height	Club	Ctr.
C	5	Diana Prnes	27 – 6 September 1995	1.92 m (6 ft 4 in)	Indeportes Antioquia	(Colombia)
C	6	Yuliany Paz	23 – 20 June 2000	1.93 m (6 ft 4 in)	Indeportes Antioquia	(Colombia)
SF	7	Hamileth Ulloa	22 – 21 January 2001	1.77 m (5 ft 10 in)
PG	8	Carolina López	24 – 18 August 1998	1.65 m (5 ft 5 in)	Indeportes Antioquia	(Colombia)
PG	9	Manuela Ríos	26 – 25 January 1997	1.63 m (5 ft 4 in)	Indeportes Antioquia	(Colombia)
F	10	Mabel Martínez	36 – 28 October 1986	1.78 m (5 ft 10 in)	Indeportes Antioquia	(Colombia)
PG	11	Mayra Caicedo	23 – 12 January 2000	1.61 m (5 ft 3 in)	Búcaros de Bucaramanga	(Colombia)
SG	12	Jennifer Muñoz	32 – 1 February 1991	1.71 m (5 ft 7 in)	Indeportes Antioquia	(Colombia)
C	14	Marlyn Venté	27 – 8 July 1995	1.85 m (6 ft 1 in)	Indeportes Antioquia	(Colombia)
PG	18	Gabriela Chivata	21 – 21 January 2002	1.66 m (5 ft 5 in)	Búcaros de Bucaramanga	(Colombia)
PF	19	Daniela González	20 – 28 July 2002	1.80 m (5 ft 11 in)	Indervalle	(Colombia)
SG	22	Esperanza Delgado	27 – 9 March 1996	1.70 m (5 ft 7 in)	Búcaros de Bucaramanga	(Colombia)

Head coach

- (Colombia) Luis Cuenca

Assistant coach(es)

- (Colombia) Sara Olarte

Legend

- Club – describes last
  club before the tournament
- Age – describes age
  on 1 July 2023

=== Dominican Republic ===
Dominican Republic women's national basketball team roster
Players
Coaches

Pos.	No.	Name	Age – Date of birth	Height	Club	Ctr.
F	1	Ángela Jiménez	20 – 3 January 2003	1.83 m (6 ft 0 in)	Club Ensanche Calero	(Dominican Republic)
SF	3	Cesarina Cappelan	19 – 3 July 2003	1.78 m (5 ft 10 in)	Baloncesto Femenino León	(Spain)
SG	4	Katiana Benítez	21 – 20 October 2001	1.72 m (5 ft 8 in)
G	5	Yohanna Morton	35 – 12 December 1987	1.72 m (5 ft 8 in)	Club De Hostos	(Dominican Republic)
SG	6	Yenifer Jiménez	24 – 1 January 1999	1.63 m (5 ft 4 in)	Reinas del Este	(Dominican Republic)
G	7	Genesis Evangelista	30 – 25 February 1993	1.80 m (5 ft 11 in)	Mauricio Báez BC	(Dominican Republic)
F	12	Esmery Martínez	23 – 1 May 2000	1.88 m (6 ft 2 in)
C	14	Yamile Rodríguez	28 – 14 October 1994	1.88 m (6 ft 2 in)	Club San Lazaro	(Spain)
C	15	Sugeiry Monsac	42 – 26 February 1981	1.85 m (6 ft 1 in)	Águilas de Guachupita	(Dominican Republic)
F	20	Hellary de los Santos	21 – 6 January 2002	1.85 m (6 ft 1 in)
F	25	Maira Andrade	27 – 23 August 1995		Ausarta Barakaldo	(Spain)

Head coach

- (Dominican Republic) Alberto Zabala

Assistant coach(es)

- (Dominican Republic) Ariel Portuondo
- (Dominican Republic) Miguel Reyes

Legend

- Club – describes last
  club before the tournament
- Age – describes age
  on 1 July 2023

=== Mexico ===
The squad was announced on 16 June.

Mexico women's national basketball team roster
Players
Coaches

Pos.	No.	Name	Age – Date of birth	Height	Club	Ctr.
PF	3	Mariana Valenzuela	20 – 1 April 2003	1.88 m (6 ft 2 in)	Florida State Seminoles	(United States)
PG	4	Katia Gallegos	21 – 23 August 2001	1.68 m (5 ft 6 in)	Tulsa Golden Hurricane	(United States)
PF	5	Jacqueline Luna	30 – 22 January 1993	1.90 m (6 ft 3 in)	Teporacas de Chihuahua	(Mexico)
G	6	Gladys Ávila	28 – 27 November 1994	1.77 m (5 ft 10 in)	Adelitas de Chihuahua	(Mexico)
F	7	Karla Martínez	23 – 7 June 2000	1.80 m (5 ft 11 in)	Panteras de Aguascalientes	(Mexico)
PG	8	Paola Beltrán	28 – 8 August 1994	1.64 m (5 ft 5 in)	Halcones de Xalapa	(Mexico)
F	10	Claudia Ramos	25 – 27 August 1997	1.80 m (5 ft 11 in)	Astros de Jalisco	(Mexico)
G	11	Sofía Payán	22 – 6 August 2000	1.67 m (5 ft 6 in)	Plateros de Fresnillo	(Mexico)
C	13	Myriam Lara	28 – 22 July 1994	1.86 m (6 ft 1 in)	Libertadores de Querétaro	(Mexico)
PG	22	Hazel Ramírez	31 – 7 June 1992	1.67 m (5 ft 6 in)	Teporacas de Chihuahua	(Mexico)
PF	23	Aixchel Hernández	20 – 26 April 2003	1.88 m (6 ft 2 in)	Cal State Fullerton Titans	(United States)
G	68	Saide Peraza	26 – 9 June 1997	1.77 m (5 ft 10 in)	Teporacas de Chihuahua	(Mexico)

Head coach

- (United States) Lindsey Harding

Assistant coach(es)

- (United States) Chasity Melvin
- (United States) Mitchell Thompson

Legend

- Club – describes last
  club before the tournament
- Age – describes age
  on 1 July 2023

=== Puerto Rico ===
Puerto Rico women's national basketball team roster
Players
Coaches

Pos.	No.	Name	Age – Date of birth	Height	Club	Ctr.
PG	0	Jennifer O'Neill	33 – 19 April 1990	1.65 m (5 ft 5 in)	Explosivas de Moca	(Puerto Rico)
F	2	Brianna Jones	26 – 9 February 1997	1.78 m (5 ft 10 in)	Cangrejeros de Santurce	(Puerto Rico)
PG	5	Pamela Rosado	37 – 30 April 1986	1.65 m (5 ft 5 in)	Montañeras de Morovis	(Puerto Rico)
PF	11	Sofía Roma	26 – 21 November 1996	1.88 m (6 ft 2 in)	Montañeras de Morovis	(Puerto Rico)
G/F	13	Kaelynn Satterfield	21 – 28 August 2001	1.83 m (6 ft 0 in)	Seton Hall Pirates	(United States)
PF	21	Mya Hollingshed	23 – 29 October 1999	1.93 m (6 ft 4 in)	WBC Dynamo Novosibirsk	(Russia)
SG	22	Arella Guirantes	25 – 15 October 1997	1.80 m (5 ft 11 in)	Seattle Storm	(United States)
PG	23	Trinity San Antonio	19 – 28 October 2003	1.74 m (5 ft 9 in)	Grand Canyon Antelopes	(United States)
SG	24	Jazmon Gwathmey	30 – 24 January 1993	1.88 m (6 ft 2 in)	PEAC-Pécs	(Hungary)
PF	25	Isalys Quiñones	25 – 23 October 1997	1.91 m (6 ft 3 in)	Osos de Manatí	(Puerto Rico)
C	33	India Pagán	24 – 7 January 1999	1.87 m (6 ft 2 in)	BC Marburg	(Germany)
G	55	Jacqueline Benítez	26 – 6 June 1997	1.55 m (5 ft 1 in)	Explosivas de Moca	(Puerto Rico)

Head coach

- (Puerto Rico) Jerry Batista

Assistant coach(es)

- (Puerto Rico) Carlos Morales

Legend

- Club – describes last
  club before the tournament
- Age – describes age
  on 1 July 2023
