= Basketball at the 2023 Pan American Games – Women's team rosters =

This article shows the rosters of all participating teams at the women's basketball tournament at the 2023 Pan American Games in Santiago.

== Argentina ==
Argentina women's basketball team roster
Players
Coaches

| Pos. | No. | Name | Age – Date of birth | Height | Club | Ctr. |
|---|---|---|---|---|---|---|
| | | Malvina D’Agostino | – | | Ameghino | (Argentina) |
| | | Valeria Fernandez | – | | Obras Sanitarias | (Argentina) |
| | | Agustina Garcia | – | | Defensor Sporting | (Uruguay) |
| | | Victoria Gauna | – | | Bishop University | (Canada) |
| | | Candela Gentinetta | – | | Obras Sanitarias | (Argentina) |
| | | Agustina Jourdehuil | – | | Malvín | (Uruguay) |
| | | Natassja Kolff | – | | Ameghino | (Argentina) |
| | | Agustina Marín | – | | CDE Francisco Franco | (Portugal) |
| | | Carla Miculka | – | | Malvín | (Uruguay) |
| | | Delfina Saravia | – | | Unión Florida | (Argentina) |
| | | Camila Suárez | – | | Obras Sanitarias | (Argentina) |
| | | Magali Vilches | – | | CB Lleida | (Spain) |

Head coach

- (Argentina) Mauricio Santángelo

Assistant coach(es)

- (Argentina) Rocío Pérez

Legend

- (C) Team captain
- Club – describes current club
- Age – describes age
  on 31 July 2023

== Chile ==
Chile women's basketball team roster
Players
Coaches

| Pos. | No. | Name | Age – Date of birth | Height | Club | Ctr. |
|---|---|---|---|---|---|---|
| | | Javiera Novión | – | | Universidad de Chile | (Chile) |
| | | Paula Carrasco | – | | Sportiva Italiana | (Chile) |
| | | Thiare Garcia | – | | Sportiva Italiana | (Chile) |
| | | Tatiana Gómez | – | | Escuela Alemana Paillaco | (Chile) |
| | | Catalina Abuyeres | – | | Universidad de Chile | (Chile) |
| | | Constanza Cárdenas | – | | Universidad La Frontera | (Chile) |
| | | Antonia Andaur | – | | Universidad de Chile | (Chile) |
| | | Catalina Pérez | – | | Sportiva Italiana | (Chile) |
| | | Josefina Cortés | – | | Sportiva Italiana | (Chile) |
| | | Barbara Cousiño | – | | Universidad de Concepción | (Chile) |
| | | Andrea Valdés | – | | Sportiva Italiana | (Chile) |
| | | Fernanda Ovalle | – | | Gimnástico | (Chile) |

Head coach

- (Chile) Gianluca Pozo

Assistant coach(es)

Legend

- (C) Team captain
- Club – describes current club
- Age – describes age
  on 31 July 2023

== Cuba ==
Cuba women's basketball team roster
Players
Coaches

| Pos. | No. | Name | Age – Date of birth | Height | Club | Ctr. |
|---|---|---|---|---|---|---|
| | | Bexy Claro | – | | Tipitapa Baloncesto | (Nicaragua) |
| | | Maria Machado | – | | Guantánamo CB | (Cuba) |
| | | Melissa Despagne | – | | Santiago de Cuba | (Cuba) |
| | | Suanly Tanis | – | | Santiago de Cuba | (Cuba) |
| | | Enriqueta Neyra | – | | Sancti Spiritus | (Cuba) |
| | | Elianis Armentero | – | | Capitalinos Azules de la Habana | (Cuba) |
| | | Dairis Tornell | – | | Tipitapa Baloncesto | (Nicaragua) |
| | | Anisleidy Galindo | – | | FAS Fever 2 | (El Salvador) |
| | | Rachel Contreras | – | | Santa Tecla F1 | (El Salvador) |
| | | Eugenia Fragela | – | | Unnatached |

Head coach

Assistant coach(es)

Legend

- (C) Team captain
- Club – describes current club
- Age – describes age
  on 31 July 2023

== Puerto Rico ==
Puerto Rico women's basketball team roster
Players
Coaches

| Pos. | No. | Name | Age – Date of birth | Height | Club | Ctr. |
|---|---|---|---|---|---|---|
| | | Tayra Melendez | – | | Gigantes de Carolina | (Puerto Rico) |
| | | Charity Harris | – | | Gigantes de Carolina | (Puerto Rico) |
| | | Arielle Gonzalez-Varner | – | | Cangrejeras de Santurce | (Puerto Rico) |
| | | Pamela Rosado | – | | Montañeras de Morovis | (Puerto Rico) |
| | | Abeliz Rodriguez | – |
| | | Ashley Torres | – | | Atenienses de Manatí | (Puerto Rico) |
| | | Sofia Roma | – | | Montañeras de Morovis | (Puerto Rico) |
| | | Narimar Vargas | – | | Cangrejeras de Santurce | (Puerto Rico) |
| | | Kaela Hilaire | – | | Atenienses de Manatí | (Puerto Rico) |
| | | Katie Villarini | – | | Montañeras de Morovis | (Puerto Rico) |
| | | Isalys Quinones | – | | Montañeras de Morovis | (Puerto Rico) |
| | | Jacqueline Benitez | – | | Explosivos de Moca | (Puerto Rico) |

Head coach

- (Puerto Rico) Jerry Batista

Assistant coach(es)

Legend

- (C) Team captain
- Club – describes current club
- Age – describes age
  on 31 July 2023

== Brazil ==
Brazil women's basketball team roster
Players
Coaches

| Pos. | No. | Name | Age – Date of birth | Height | Club | Ctr. |
|---|---|---|---|---|---|---|
| | | Débora Costa | – | | SESI Araraquara | (Brazil) |
| | | Maria Albiero | – | | Ituano | (Brazil) |
| | | Ana Beatriz Oliveira | – | | Unimed/Campinas | (Brazil) |
| | | Carina dos Santos | – | | Unimed/Campinas | (Brazil) |
| | | Gabriela Soares | – | | SESI Araraquara | (Brazil) |
| | | Leila Zabani | – | | Ituano | (Brazil) |
| | | Emanuely de Oliveira | – | | SESI Araraquara | (Brazil) |
| | | Vanessa Sassá | – | | Santo André | (Brazil) |
| | | Aline Moura | – | | SESI Araraquara | (Brazil) |
| | | Licinara Bispo | – | | Unimed/Campinas | (Brazil) |
| | | Mariana Dias | – | | Ituano | (Brazil) |
| | | Érika de Souza | – | | Sampaio Basquete | (Brazil) |

Head coach

- (Brazil) João Camargo

Assistant coach(es)

- (France) Virgil Lopez

Legend

- (C) Team captain
- Club – describes current club
- Age – describes age
  on 31 July 2023

== Colombia ==
Colombia women's basketball team roster
Players
Coaches

| Pos. | No. | Name | Age – Date of birth | Height | Club | Ctr. |
|---|---|---|---|---|---|---|
| | | María Delgado | – | | Neptunas | (Lithuania) |
| | | Meredith Venner | – | | Unnatached |
| | | Isabel Rodríguez | – | | Escuela | (Colombia) |
| | | Manuela Rios | – | | Teporacas de Chihuahua | (Mexico) |
| | | Yanet Arias | – | | Búcaros de Bucaramanga | (Colombia) |
| | | Mayra Caicedo | – | | Indeportes Antioquia | (Colombia) |
| | | Mabel Martínez | – | | Olimpia | (Paraguay) |
| | | Marlyn Vente | – | | Malvín | (Uruguay) |
| | | Yuliany Paz | – | | Indeportes Antioquia | (Colombia) |
| | | Jenifer Muñoz | – | | Malvín | (Uruguay) |
| | | Carolina López | – | | Indeportes Antioquia | (Colombia) |

Head coach

- (Colombia) Luis Miguel Cuenca

Assistant coach(es)

- (Colombia) Ricardo Pinzón

Legend

- (C) Team captain
- Club – describes current club
- Age – describes age
  on 31 July 2023

== Mexico ==
Mexico women's basketball team roster
Players
Coaches

| Pos. | No. | Name | Age – Date of birth | Height | Club | Ctr. |
|---|---|---|---|---|---|---|
| | | Hazel Ramirez | – | | Borregas del ITESM Monterrey | (Mexico) |
| | | Paola Beltrán | – | | Aztks del Estado de México | (Mexico) |
| | | Sofia Payán | – | | Teporacas de Chihuahua | (Mexico) |
| | | Carmen González | – | | Bujías de Aguascalientes | (Mexico) |
| | | Karla Martinez | – | | Barreteras de Zacatecas | (Mexico) |
| | | Sandra Vargas | – | | Aztks del Estado de México | (Mexico) |
| | | Gladiana Ávila | – | | Centauros de Chihuahua | (Mexico) |
| | | Anisa Jeffreis | – | | Borregas del ITESM Monterrey | (Mexico) |
| | | Claudia Ramos | – | | Astros de Jalisco | (Mexico) |
| | | Jacqueline Luna | – | | Aztks del Estado de México | (Mexico) |
| | | Myriam Lara | – | | Teporacas de Chihuahua | (Mexico) |
| | | Diana Armas | – | | Marineras de Puerto Vallarta | (Mexico) |

Head coach

- (United States) Ebony Hoffman

Assistant coach(es)

Legend

- (C) Team captain
- Club – describes current club
- Age – describes age
  on 31 July 2023

== Venezuela ==
Venezuela women's basketball team roster
Players
Coaches

| Pos. | No. | Name | Age – Date of birth | Height | Club | Ctr. |
|---|---|---|---|---|---|---|
| | | Barbara Pico | – | | Pastoras de Lara | (Venezuela) |
| | | Génesis Rivera | – | | CPN Basquetebol | (Portugal) |
| | | Yosimar Corrales | – | | Quimsa | (Argentina) |
| | | Guadalupe Diaz | – | | Pastoras de Lara | (Venezuela) |
| | | Gisell Ramirez | – | | Pastoras de Lara | (Venezuela) |
| | | Ivaney Marquez | – | | Cayenas de Carabobo | (Venezuela) |
| | | Mirielka Garate | – | | Panteras | (Peru) |
| | | Mariana Duran | – | | Pallacanestro Bolzano | (Italy) |
| | | Waleska Pérez | – | | ZKK Kraljevo | (Serbia) |
| | | Jormelys Urbina | – | | Club 25 de Agosto | (Uruguay) |
| | | Aguehil Fajardo | – | | KK Lavovi Brčko | (Bosnia and Herzegovina) |
| | | Leudys Quevedo | – | | Cayenas de Carabobo | (Venezuela) |

Head coach

- (Venezuela) Eduardo Pinto

Assistant coach(es)

- (Venezuela) José Gallardo

Legend

- (C) Team captain
- Club – describes current club
- Age – describes age
  on 31 July 2023
