= Kee Mar College =

Women's college in Hagerstown, Maryland (1853–1911)

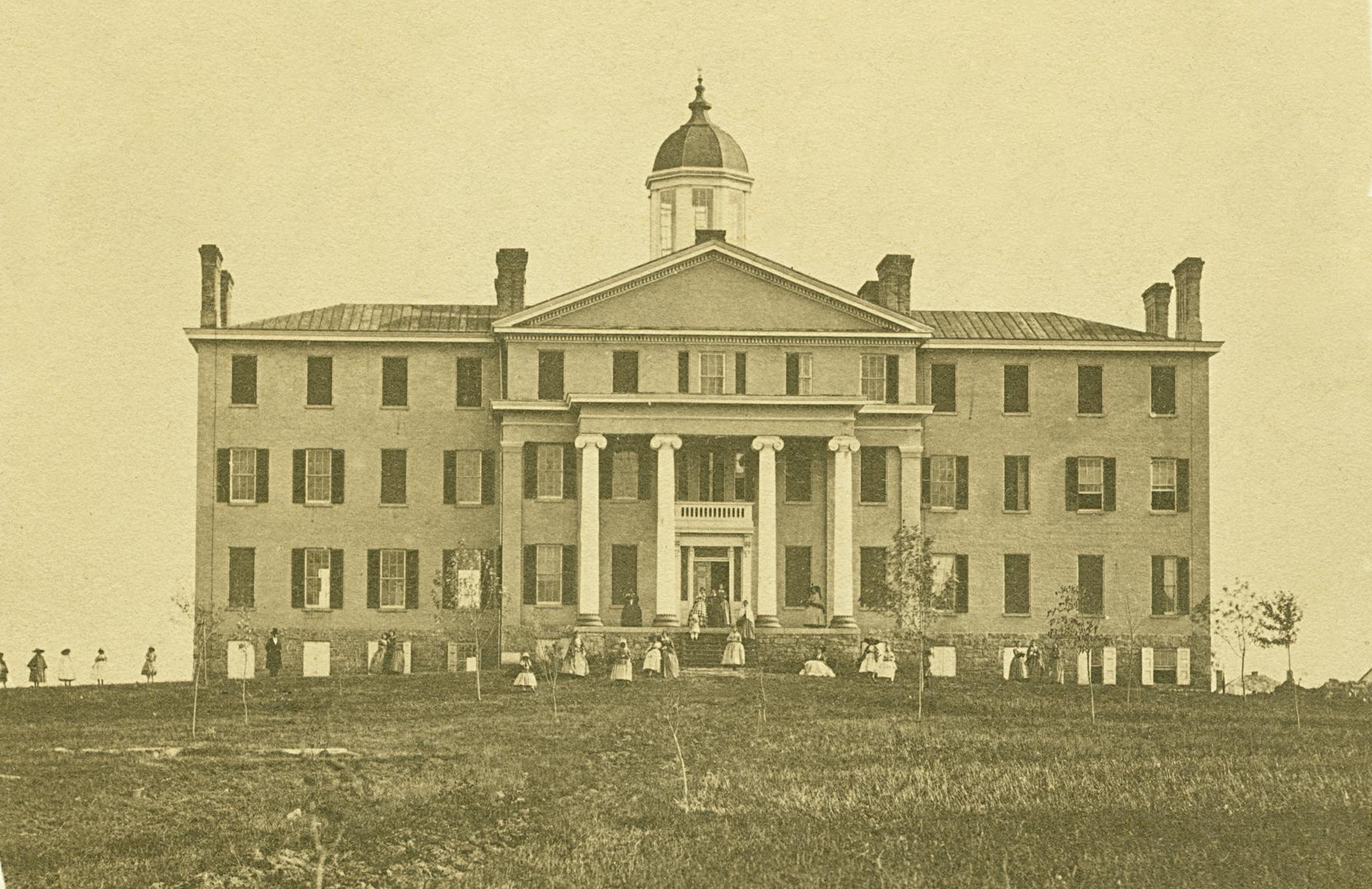
- circa 1855
- Other name: Kee-Mar College of Washington County
- Former name: Hagerstown Female Seminary (1853–1889)
- Type: Private
- Active: 1853–1911
- Religious affiliation: Lutheran
- Location: Hagerstown, Maryland, US

Kee Mar College was a private women's college in Hagerstown, Maryland. It was founded in 1853 as the Hagerstown Female Seminary under the auspices of the Lutheran church. The college conferred Bachelor of Arts (A.B.) and Master of Arts (A.M.) degrees. After a period of financial trouble, the school was sold to the Washington County Hospital Association in 1911.

== History ==
=== 19th century ===
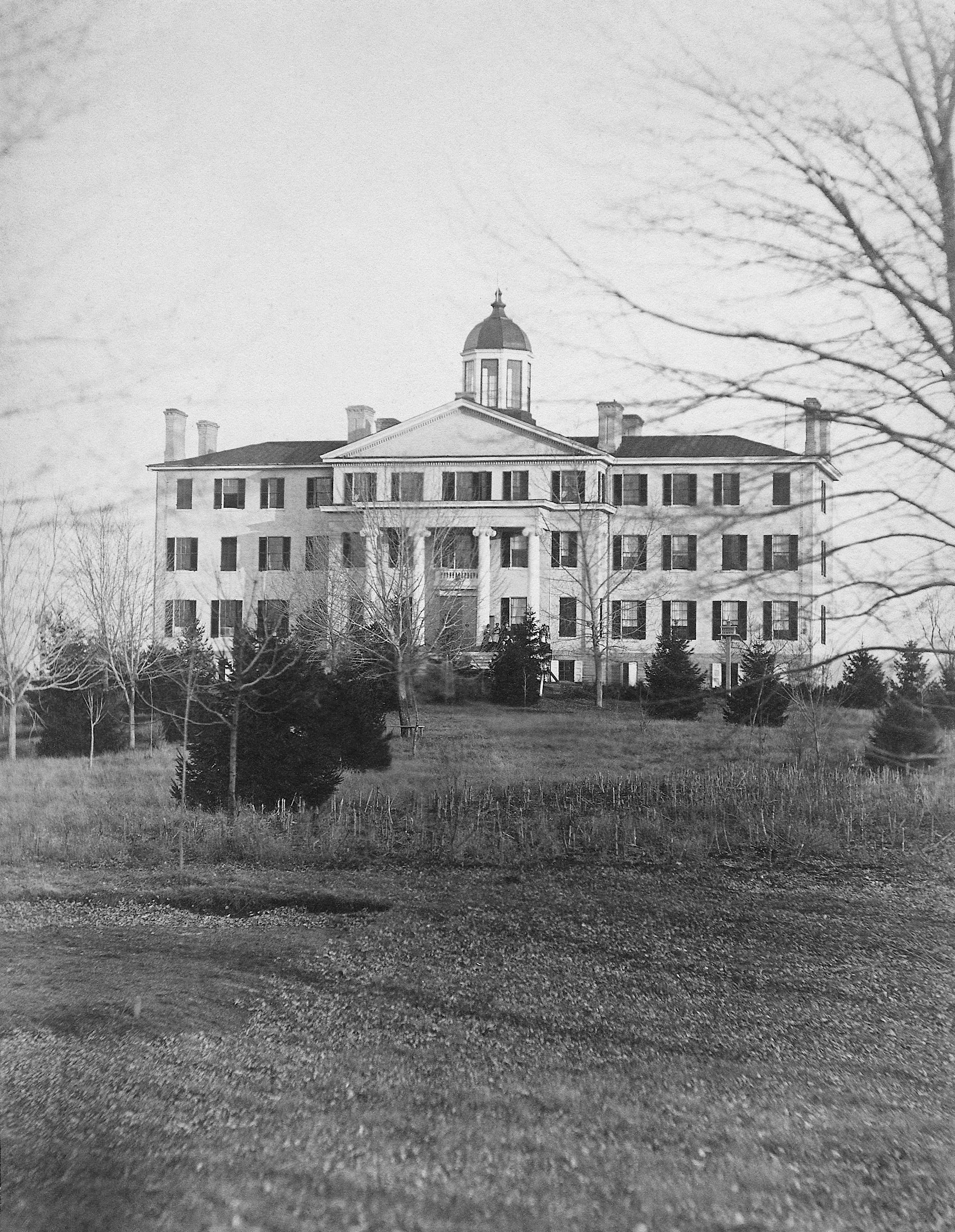
Kee Mar College in the 1860s

In the 1840s, a group of civic leaders conceived the idea to improve advanced education for women in Hagerstown, Maryland. These subscribers held a general meeting to elect a board of trustees that consisted of 15 members. Ten were members of the Lutheran church (including five ministers). In 1848, a site was selected on the "eastern extremity" of Antietam Street. The land was purchased on July 10, 1852, for $1,400. On September 21, 1853, the Hagerstown Female Seminary formally opened. It was established under the auspices of the Lutheran church with $25,000 raised for the construction and endowment. Reverend C. C. Baugham of the Evangelical Lutheran Synod was appointed to be in charge of the seminary. In its first year, 101 students from ten states including Alabama, Pennsylvania, Illinois, West Virginia, and Ohio enrolled. In 1857, the seminary produced its first graduates. During a period of financial trouble, the board of trustees applied to the Maryland General Assembly for an act to allow them to raise funds or sell property to meet its financial obligations. The Assembly created a plan and enacted it into law before further developments were delayed by the American Civil War. Reverend W. F. Eyster succeeded Baughman as the principal in 1863. When the Confederate States Army marched through Hagerstown, the seminary sent its students home and closed for two years. During the Battle of Antietam, the campus was used as a hospital. For nine months between 1865 and 1866, Evelyn Mac and Kate Doolittle acted as principals. In 1865, a committee of the Maryland Lutheran Synod authorized the formation of a corporation of Lutherans to purchase the seminary. In 1866, two Lutherans, Charles W. Humrichhouse and J. C. Bridges purchased the seminary. Humrichhouse later became the sole owner.

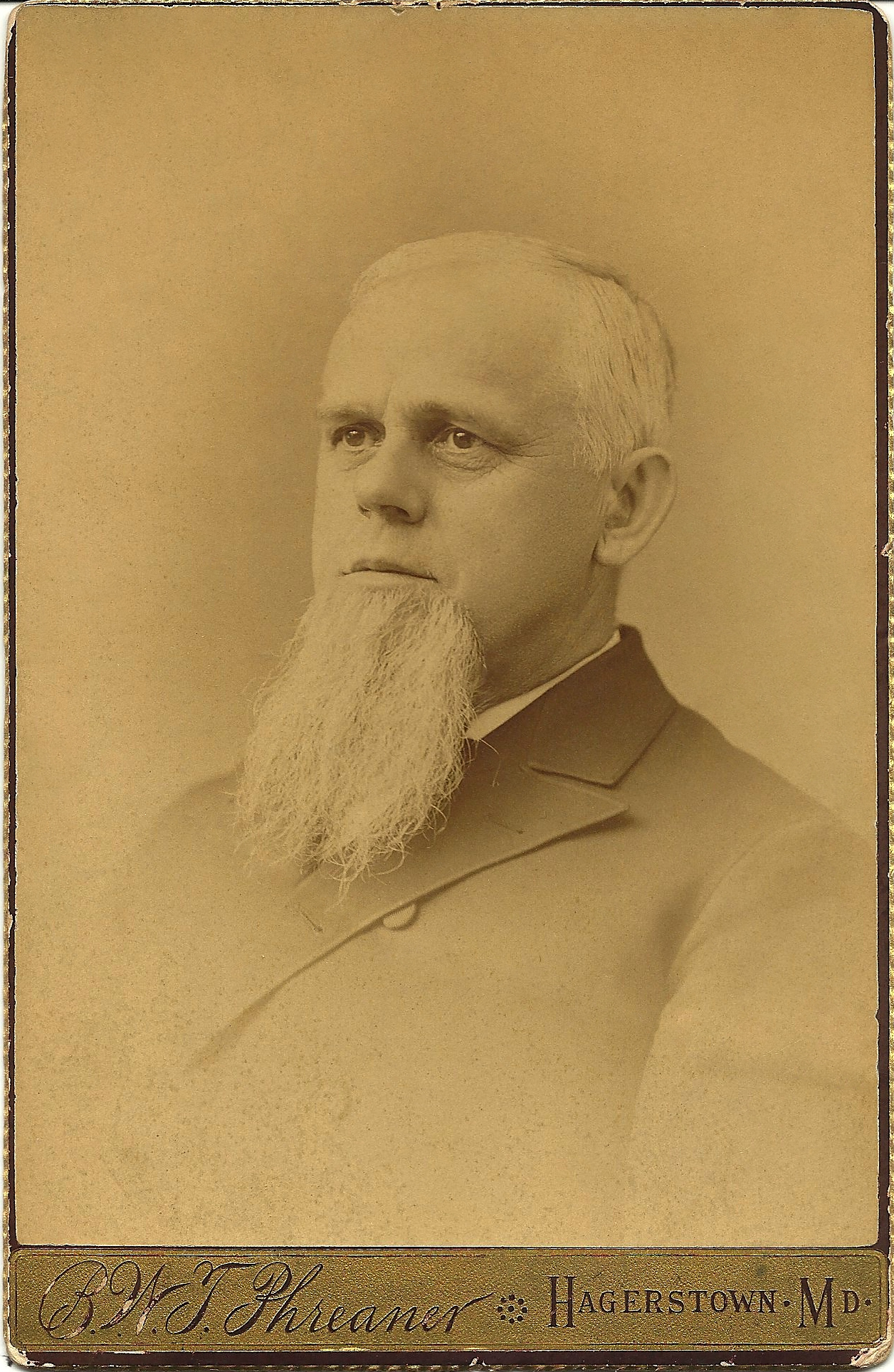
Cabinet card of Cornelius L. Keedy, who bought the college in 1878

In 1875, Reverend Cornelius L. Keedy became president of the seminary. He purchased the institution from Humrichouse in 1878. In 1889, the school was renamed Kee Mar College. The name is based on the first three letters of Keedy's name and the first three letters of his wife's maiden name, Marburg. The college seal was a reproduction of an intaglio found in Pompeii. The original intaglio has been in the British Museum, belonged to the king of Saxony, and was in the possession of principal Margaret Barry.^{pg. 182}

=== 20th century ===
In April 1901, Keedy sold Kee Mar to Daniel W. Doub and Henry Holzapfel Jr. They incorporated the school with the name Kee-Mar College of Washington County. In 1905, president Bruce Lesher Kershner and his brother, Frederick Doyle Kershener, dean of faculty, disposed of their financial interests in the college to William C. Aughinbaugh, who became financially interested in the college. The Kershner brothers remained with the college until the close of the scholastic year. The Kershners held 49 shares of a total issue of 100. The stock was purchased at par. In 1906, William C. Aughenbaugh purchased Doub's stock, which M. P. Moller had invested in. A board of trustees, comprising chair Holzapfel, Humrichhouse, M. L. Keedy, M. P. Moller, George Oawald, and Jacob Roessner was formed to provide direction. The school closed in 1911. Kee Mar College was purchased by the Washington County Hospital Association for the reported price of $60,000. The buildings were converted for hospital purposes.

== Campus ==
Kee Mar College consisted of 11 acres (4.5 ha) centrally located on high ground in Hagerstown with a view of the Cumberland Valley. From its buildings, one could view the Blue Ridge Mountains, Crampton's Gap, and South Mountain. The buildings comprised a main college building, a music hall, and a large auditorium. These were all heated by steam and lighted by gas and electricity. The campus contained ten acres (4.0 ha) of forested land containing a mix of shrubbery, evergreens, and maples. The main hall exhibited Romanesque architecture and landscaped gardens. The campus was designed by a Baltimore architect and a Philadelphia landscape gardener. The auditorium was constructed in 1894.

== Academics ==
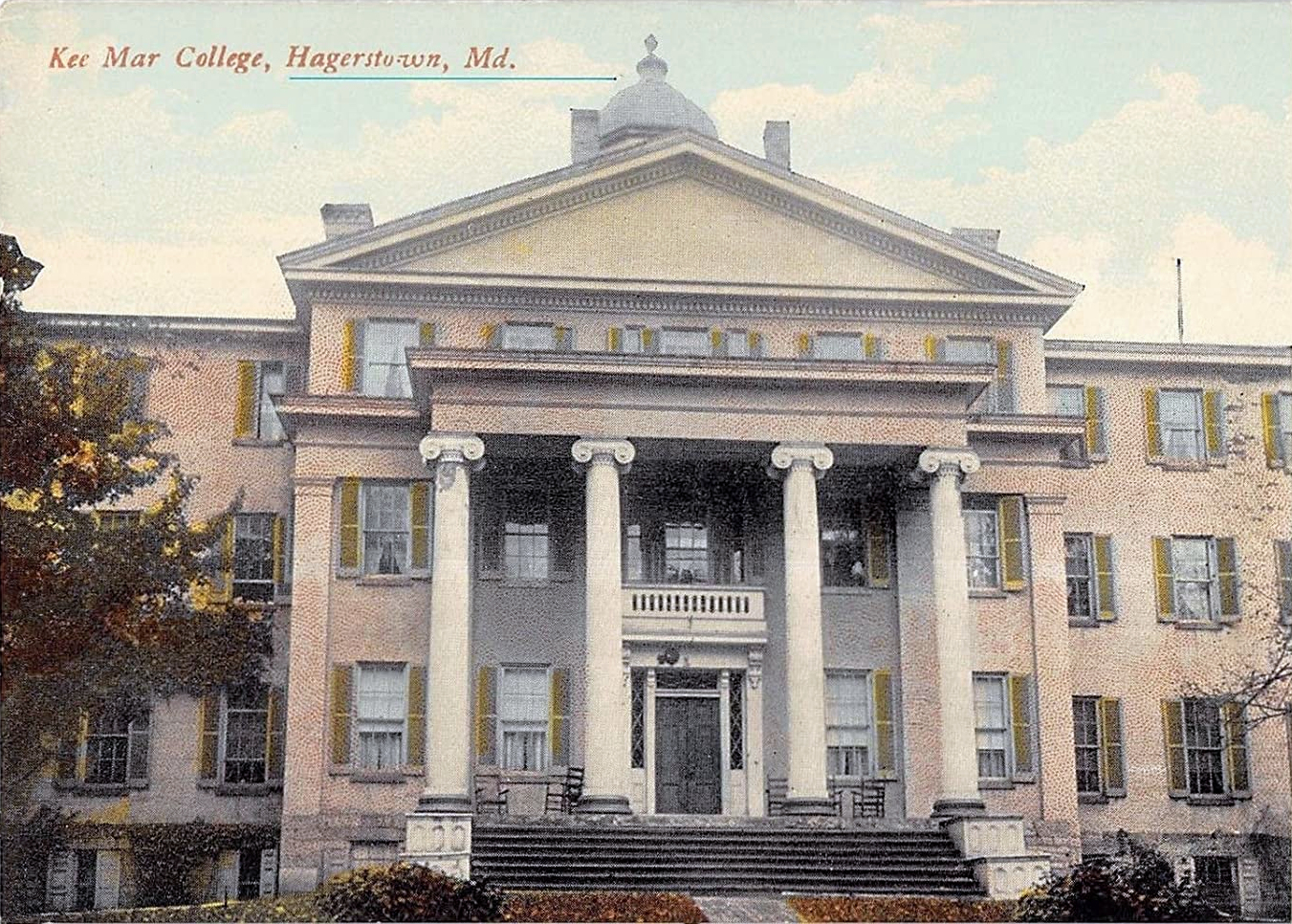
Postcard of Kee Mar College

The curriculum included the departments of philosophy, history, mathematics, natural science, and English, Latin, Greek, French, and German language and literature. The college conferred Bachelor of Arts (A.B.) and Master of Arts (A.M.) degrees. Diplomas were conferred for literary courses, music, and art.

Kee Mar was known for its notable faculty members. The institution maintained a close relation with the American Society for the Extension of University Teaching. One member of its staff was an affiliated teacher. Two courses of university extension lecturers were given during the year 1905 to 1906 and other lectures were frequently held. Two literary organizations, The Society of Elaine and The Society of Antigone, helped students put to into practice the knowledge acquired in the classroom. The separate departments of Kee Mar had specialized libraries containing a mix of reference books and works of general interest. Students also had use of the Old Washington County Library located nearby.

Painting was taught as an allied department of the institution, and history of art was studied as a feature of the curriculum. Kee Mar hosted a collection of art reproductions brought from Italy. A series of over thirty reproductions of Sistine frescoes of the Vatican, made under the supervision of John Ruskin, was available for use by the students. A large collection of similar reproductions of drawings, namely by Leonardo da Vinci, Michelangelo, and Raphael were in position by the college. The music faculty comprised teachers from conservatories in Europe. The Margaret Barry School of Expression featured opportunities to develop aesthetic culture.

== Student life ==
Chapel services were held daily and students were expected to attend the church to which they belonged or which their parents selected on Sundays. Vespers were conducted by ministers of different denominations every Sunday. For student social life, formal receptions were held during the school term and the laws of polite society observed at all times. The school's amateur theatrical productions were popular in the Hagerstown area. Kee Mar hosted an alumnae association that continued after the school's closure. In 1949, the association was still in operation. Activities included raising funds for educational scholarships for local students and annual parties.

== People ==
=== Presidents ===
- Cornelius L. Keedy (1875-1900)
- Bruce Lesher Kershner (1905-1906)
- J. Emory Shaw (1906-1907)
- Bruce Lesher Kershner (1909)

=== Notable alumni ===
- Cathrine Countiss (1873–1955), actress
- Annie S. Kemerer (1865—1951), art collector and founder of the Kemerer Museum of Decorative Arts

== See also ==
- Women's colleges in the Southern United States
