= Algaze =

Algaze is a surname. Notable people with the surname include:

- Guillermo Algaze (born 1954), Cuban anthropologist
- Mario Algaze (born 1947), Cuban-American photographer
