= Kemer (disambiguation) =

Kemer is a seaside resort and district of Antalya Province, Turkey.

Kemer may also refer to:

== Places ==
- Kemer, Burdur, Turkey, a town and district
- Kemer, Biga, Çanakkale, Turkey, a village
- Kemer, Kozan, Adana, Turkey, a village
- Kemer Dam, a dam in Bozdoğan, Aydın, Turkey
- Kemer railway station, a railway station in İzmir, Anatolia, Turkey

== Other uses ==
- Cemre Kemer (born 1985), Turkish singer and songwriter

== See also ==
- Kemerer (disambiguation)
- Kemmer
