= Kemme =

Kemme is a surname. Notable people with the surname include:

- Carl A. Kemme (born 1960), Catholic bishop in the United States
- Tabea Kemme (born 1991), German football player

== See also ==
- Kemmer
