= William Granda =

Cuban basketball player

Ciego de Avila
- Position: Shooting guard
- League: Liga Superior de Baloncesto (LSB)

Personal information
- Born: August 8, 1985 (age 41) Ciego de Ávila, Cuba
- Listed height: 6 ft 3 in (1.91 m)
- Listed weight: 209 lb (95 kg)

Career information
- Playing career: 2004–present

Career history
- 2004–2015: Ciego de Avila (Cuba)
- 2015–2016: Club Atlético Tabaré (Uruguay)
- 2016-Present: Ciego de Avila

William Granda Lewis (born August 8, 1985), is a Cuban professional basketball player. He currently plays for the Ciego de Avila club of the LSB in Cuba.

He has been a member of Cuba's national basketball team. At the 2016 Centrobasket in Panama City, he was Cuba's best three point shooter (three point shots made).
