= Club Deportivo San Andrés Basquet =

San Andrés
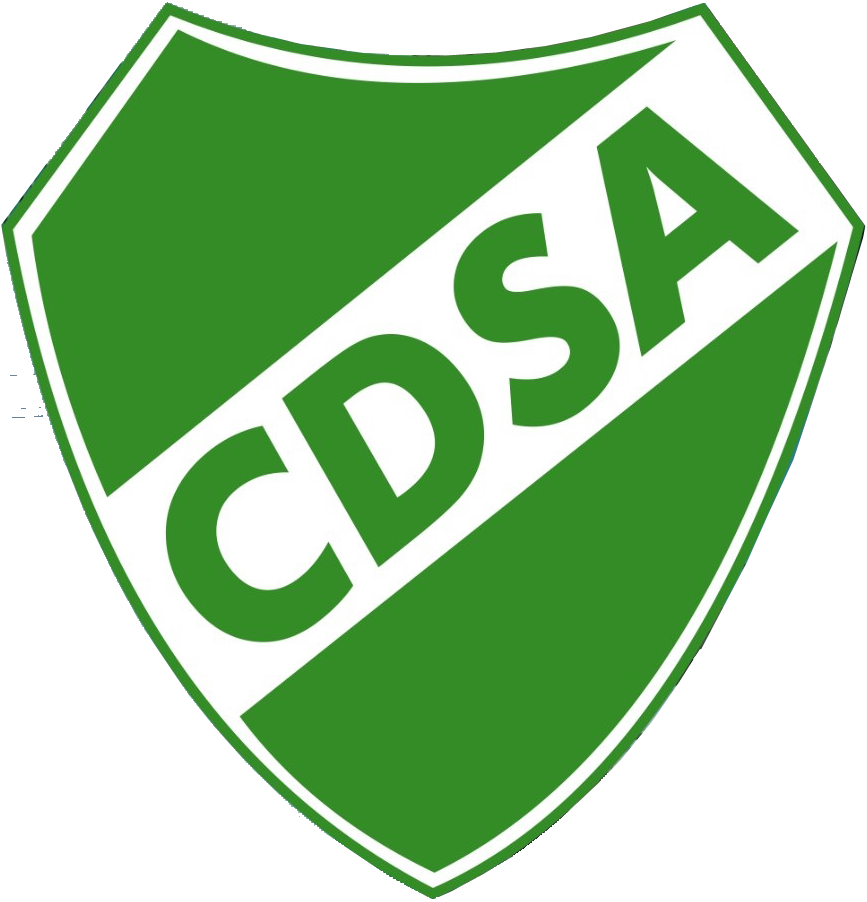
- Nickname: Depor
- Founded: April 23, 1927; 98 years ago
- Arena: San Andrés stadium, Marengo y P. Luna
- Location: San Andrés, Greater Buenos Aires, Argentina
- Team colors: Green, White
- President: Graciela Spiazzi
- Championships: 1 Campeonato Argentino
Home	Away

Club Deportivo San Andrés is an Argentine sports club based in San Andrés district of General San Martín Partido, Greater Buenos Aires.

The club gained notoriety during the 1980s, when its basketball team competed in the first division, winning the last edition of Campeonato Argentino in 1984, prior to creation of Liga Nacional de Básquet.

Apart from basketball, San Andrés hosts the practise of other sports, such as Five-a-side football, karate, swimming, tennis and volleyball.

== History ==
The club was founded on April 23, 1927, as Club Deportivo San Andrés (Villa Golf Club). One year later the club added activities such as bocce, boxing, chess, and basketball. In 1939 the institution changed its name to "Club Deportivo San Andrés" while starting to build a basketball court.

San Andrés debuted in the Argentine league in 1956, competing in Asociación Porteña de Básquetball (Buenos Aires Basketball Association), with Oscar Loco Ibáñez and Alfredo Stanizewski as its most notable players. Being coached by professor Bobino, El Depor promoted to second division. In 1959 San Andrés promoted to the first division.

After playing nine years at the top division of Argentine basketball, San Andrés won its first title in 1968 after beating Racing Club by 66–65 at Estadio Luna Park. Coached by Leopoldo Contarbio, some of San Andrés players were Ibáñez, Stanizewski, Chamorro, Sujero and Calvo.

Nevertheless, San Andrés would be relegated to the second division (Primera B) returning to the top division in 1982. Three years later San Andrés won the Campeonato Argentino beating River Plate at the finals, after three games played (2–1 on aggregate).

San Andrés made it to the final of the South American Club Championship in 1985. Te team also competed at the 1985 edition of the Intercontinental Cup.

== Honours ==
- Campeonato Argentino (1): 1984
