= 1985 FIBA Club World Cup =

- League: FIBA Club World Cup
- Sport: Basketball
- Finals champions: (Spain) FC Barcelona
- Runners-up: (Brazil) Monte Líbano

FIBA Club World Cup seasons
- ← 1984 FIBA Intercontinental Cup 1986 FIBA Club World Cup →

The 1985 FIBA Club World Cup was the 19th edition of the FIBA Intercontinental Cup for men's basketball clubs. It was the second edition of the competition that was held under the name of FIBA Club World Cup. It took place at Barcelona and Girona. From the FIBA European Champions Cup participated Banco di Roma Virtus, Limoges, Cibona, and FC Barcelona. Also participating were Monte Líbano, San Andrés, and Guantánamo from the South American Club Championship. The Team USA NCAA Olympics Select Team, called the Golden Eagles, took part from the Division I (NCAA), and Maxaquene took part from the FIBA Africa Clubs Champions Cup. The Northern Cement, the Philippines, took part from the FIBA Asia Championship.

== Participants ==
Continent	Teams	Clubs			
Europe	4	(Socialist Federal Republic of Yugoslavia) Cibona	(Spain) FC Barcelona	(France) Limoges	(Italy) Banco di Roma Virtus
North America	2	(Cuba) Guantánamo	(United States) Golden Eagles		
South America	2	(Brazil) Monte Líbano	(Argentina) San Andrés		
Africa	1	(Mozambique) Maxaquene			
Asia	1	(Philippines) Northern Cement			

== Group stage ==
=== Group A ===
	Team	Pld	Pts	W	L	PF	PA
1.	(Argentina) San Andrés	4	8	4	0	431	330
2.	(Spain) FC Barcelona	4	7	3	1	415	340
3.	(France) Limoges	4	6	2	2	343	306
4.	(Cuba) Guantánamo	4	5	1	3	305	358
5.	(Mozambique) Maxaquene	4	4	0	4	237	397

Day 1, June 23 1985, Barcelona

Team 1	Score	Team 2
FC Barcelona (Spain)	106–111	(Argentina) San Andrés
Guantánamo (Cuba)	78–59	(Mozambique) Maxaquene

Day 2, June 24 1985, Barcelona

Team 1	Score	Team 2
Guantánamo (Cuba)	77–108	(Argentina) San Andrés
FC Barcelona (Spain)	91–83	(France) Limoges

Day 3, June 25 1985, Barcelona

Team 1	Score	Team 2
Limoges (France)	84–68	(Cuba) Guantánamo
San Andrés (Argentina)	114–65	(Mozambique) Maxaquene

Day 4, June 26 1985, Barcelona

Team 1	Score	Team 2
Limoges (France)	94–49	(Mozambique) Maxaquene
FC Barcelona (Spain)	107–82	(Cuba) Guantánamo

Day 5, June 27 1985, Barcelona

Team 1	Score	Team 2
San Andrés (Argentina)	98–82	(France) Limoges
FC Barcelona (Spain)	111–64	(Mozambique) Maxaquene

=== Group B ===
	Team	Pld	Pts	W	L	PF	PA
1.	(Socialist Federal Republic of Yugoslavia) Cibona	4	7	3	1	382	354
2.	(Brazil) Monte Líbano	4	7	3	1	354	328
3.	(United States) Golden Eagles	4	6	2	2	324	326
4.	(Philippines) Northern Cement	4	5	1	3	334	349
5.	(Italy) Banco di Roma Virtus	4	5	1	3	338	375

Day 1, June 23 1985, Girona

Team 1	Score	Team 2
Cibona (Socialist Federal Republic of Yugoslavia)	111–86	(Philippines) Northern Cement
Golden Eagles (United States)	87–76	(Italy) Banco di Roma Virtus

Day 2, June 24 1985, Girona

Team 1	Score	Team 2
Golden Eagles (United States)	81–73	(Philippines) Northern Cement
Monte Líbano (Brazil)	92–82	(Italy) Banco di Roma Virtus

Day 3, June 25 1985, Girona

Team 1	Score	Team 2
Monte Líbano (Brazil)	78–77	(Philippines) Northern Cement
Cibona (Socialist Federal Republic of Yugoslavia)	81–79	(United States) Golden Eagles

Day 4, June 26 1985, Girona

Team 1	Score	Team 2
Northern Cement (Philippines)	98–79	(Italy) Banco di Roma Virtus
Cibona (Socialist Federal Republic of Yugoslavia)	92–88	(Brazil) Monte Líbano

Day 5, June 27 1985, Girona

Team 1	Score	Team 2
Monte Líbano (Brazil)	96–77	(United States) Golden Eagles
Banco di Roma Virtus (Italy)	101–98	(Socialist Federal Republic of Yugoslavia) Cibona

== Places 1-4 ==
=== Semi finals ===
June 28 1985, Barcelona & Girona

Team 1	Score	Team 2
San Andrés (Argentina)	93–95	(Brazil) Monte Líbano
Cibona (Socialist Federal Republic of Yugoslavia)	68–74	(Spain) FC Barcelona

=== 3rd place game ===
June 29 1985, Barcelona

Team 1	Score	Team 2
San Andrés (Argentina)	82–109	(Socialist Federal Republic of Yugoslavia) Cibona

=== Final ===
29 June 1985 Final	FC Barcelona (Spain)	93–89	(Brazil) Monte Líbano	Barcelona
21:00	Scoring by half: 47–51, 46–38
	Pts: Epi 39; Rebs: Howard 16; Asts: Three players 1	Boxscore	Pts: Marcel 38; Rebs: Cadum, Misevicius 5 Asts: Maury 2	Arena: Palau Blaugrana; Attendance: 5,000; Referees: Don Cline (CAN), Mikhail Davidov (USSR)

1985 Intercontinental Champions

FC Barcelona
1st title

== Final standings ==
	Team
Gold medal	(Spain) FC Barcelona
Silver medal	(Brazil) Monte Líbano
Bronze medal	(Socialist Federal Republic of Yugoslavia) Cibona
4.	(Argentina) San Andrés
5.	(France) Limoges
6.	(United States) Golden Eagles
7.	(Philippines) Northern Cement
8.	(Italy) Banco di Roma Virtus
9.	(Cuba) Guantánamo
10.	(Mozambique) Maxaquene
