= Kemmer =

Kemmer is a surname. Notable people with the surname include:

- Bill Kemmer (1873–1945), American baseball player
- Ed Kemmer (1921–2004), American actor
- Heike Kemmer (born 1962), German equestrian
- Herbert Kemmer (1905–1962), German field hockey player
- Jean-Pierre Kemmer (1923–1991), Luxembourgian composer and conductor
- Mariette Kemmer (born 1953), Luxembourgian opera singer
- Nicholas Kemmer (1911–1998), Russian-born British physicist
- Ronja Kemmer (born 1989), German politician

== See also ==
- Kemer (disambiguation)
- Kemmerer (disambiguation)
