= Ricardo Viera =

Cuban-born American artist, educator (1945–2020)

- Born: December 15, 1945; Ciego de Avila, Cuba
- Died: April 1, 2020 (aged 74); Miami, Florida, U.S.
- Education: School of the Museum of Fine Arts (BFA), Rhode Island School of Design (MFA), University of Colorado Boulder
- Occupations: Visual artist, educator, museum director, curator, art collector
- Spouse: Patricia Medeiros

Ricardo Viera (December 15, 1945 – April 1, 2020) was a Cuban-born American visual artist, educator, museum director, art collector, and curator. He specializing in working in painting, drawing, and engraving. He was a professor of art at Lehigh University in Pennsylvania from 1974 until 2018; and also served as the director and chief curator of the Lehigh University Art Galleries (LUAG) museum.

== Early life and education ==
Ricardo Viera was born in December 15, 1945, in Ciego de Avila, Camagüey, Cuba. When he was 17 years old, Viera immigrated to the United States.

He received a BFA degree in 1973 from the School of the Museum of Fine Arts (now School of the Museum of Fine Arts at Tufts) in Boston, Massachusetts; and a MFA degree in 1974 from the Rhode Island School of Design in Providence, Rhode Island. Additionally he received a certificate of museum management from the museum at the University of Colorado Boulder.

== Curatorships ==
In 1982, Viera worked as a curator consultant for six months for the Cuban Museum of Arts and Culture (formerly the Cuban Museum of the Americas, 1974–1999) in Miami.

Between 1988–1989, he was the curator of the 24th Annual Contemporary American Art Exhibition. In 1989 he made the curatorships of the exhibitions William Rau. Photographer: The Lehigh Valley Railroad Photographs. In 1994 he worked also in American Voices: Cuban American Photography in the U.S.'', in FotoFest'94, Fifth Biennial International Festival of Photography, Houston, U.S. In 1998 he was the curator of Josef Bajus. Design Explorations Mixed Media, in DuBois Gallery, Lehigh University Art Galleries, Pennsylvania, U.S.

== Exhibitions ==
=== Solo exhibitions ===
In 1979 he exhibited his works in Ricardo Viera., in the Sardoni Art Gallery, Wilkes College, Wilkes Bane, Pennsylvania, U.S. In 1985 he presented Island on my mind in the Museum of Contemporary Hispanic Art (MOCHA), New York City, U.S. In 1986 he made other personal exhibition: 'Ricardo Viera: Computer Graphics 1986, in the Kemerer Museum, Bethlehem, Pennsylvania, U.S. And in 1987 he presented his works in Ricardo Viera: Computer Art, in the East Stroudsburg University Art Gallery, East Stroudsburg, Pennsylvania, U.S.

=== Group exhibitions ===
He was part of many collective exhibitions, among them we can quote in 1977 Re encuentro Cubano 1977, Museo Cubano de Arte y Cultura, Miami, Florida, U.S. Some of his works were selected to conform the V (1981) and VII (1986) Bienal de San Juan del Grabado Latinoamericano y del Caribe, San Juan, Puerto Rico. In 1982 he was one of the selected artists to conform Young Hispanics U.S., in the 27th Annual Contemporary Art. Ralph Wilson Gallery, Lehigh University Art Galleries, Bethlehem, Pennsylvania, U.S. And in 1990 he was also included in the Urban Anthropology, in the Sculptors Gallery, New York City, U.S.

== Awards ==
He obtained many awards, such as the Cintas Foundation Fellowship, New York City 1974-1975. And in 1980, 1981 and 1984, he gained the Pennsylvania Governor's Award for Excellence in the Arts.

== Death and legacy ==
Viera died at the age of 75 on April 1, 2020, in Miami, Florida, after cardiac arrest.

His works can be found as part of important collections, such as Cintas Foundation, New York City; the Cleveland Museum, Cleveland, Ohio; the Lowe Art Museum at the University of Miami; the David C. Driskell Center at the University of Maryland; the Noyes Museum, New Jersey; and the Tel Aviv Museum, Israel.
