= Cornelius L. Keedy =

American pastor, physician, and academic administrator (1834–1911)

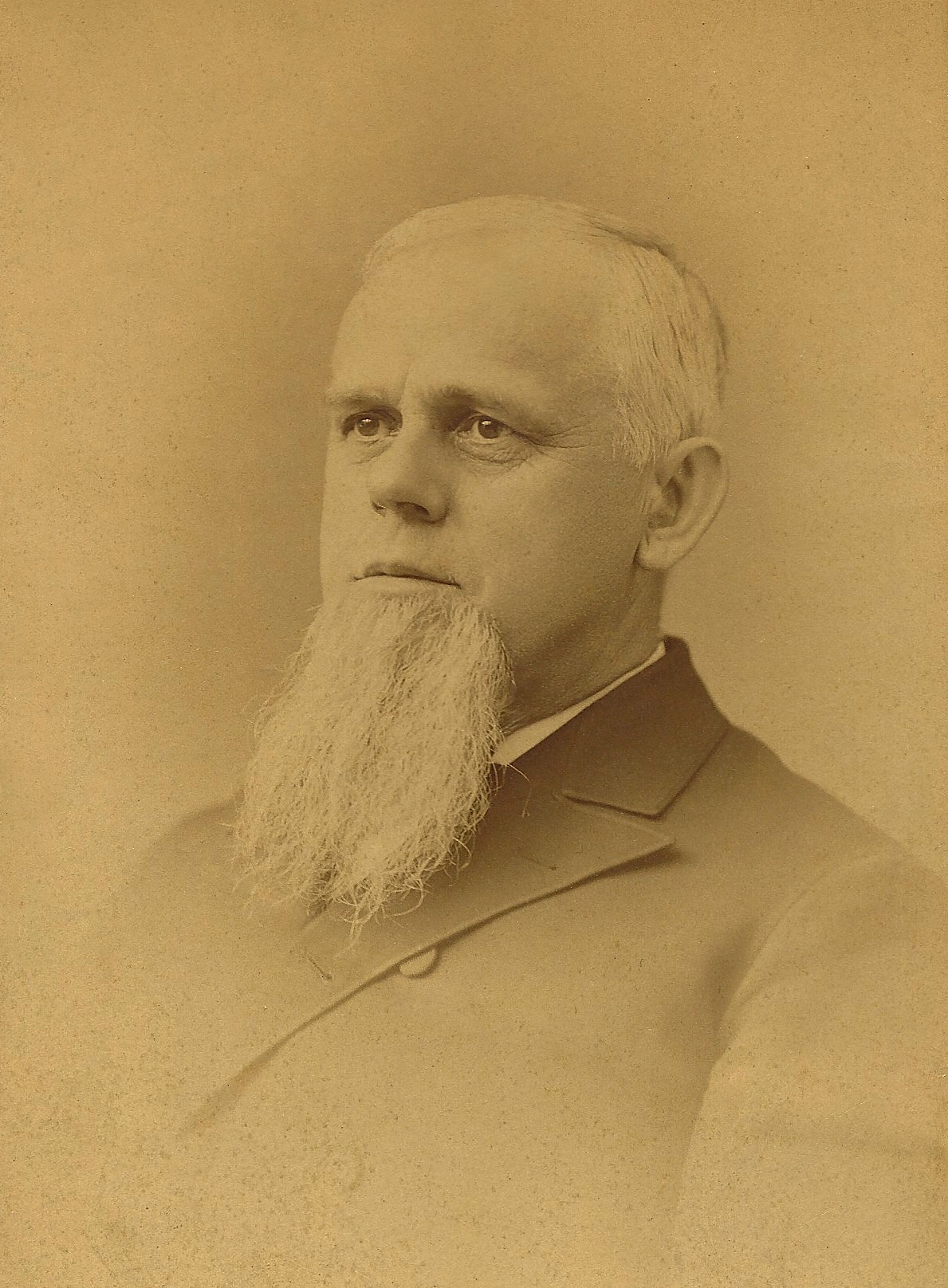

President of Kee Mar College
- In office 1875–1900

Personal details
- Born: March 28, 1834 Rohrersville, Maryland, US
- Died: March 25, 1911 (aged 76) Hagerstown, Maryland, US
- Children: 4
- Education: Pennsylvania College; Lutheran Theological Seminary at Gettysburg; University of Pennsylvania
- Occupation: Pastor, physician, academic administrator

Cornelius Luther Keedy (March 28, 1834 – March 25, 1911) was an American pastor, physician, and academic administrator. He served as owner and president of Kee Mar College for 25 years.

== Life ==
Keedy was born March 28, 1834, in Rohrersville, Maryland to Daniel and Sophia Miller Keedy. He was admitted to Pennsylvania College and the Lutheran Theological Seminary at Gettysburg. Keedy was ordained to preach by the East Pennsylvania Lutheran Synod. He was licensed in 1859. He was pastor of Lutheran churches at various times at Johnstown, Riegelsville, Barren Hill, and Waynesboro. In 1860, Keedy married Elizabeth Wyatt Marbourg, the daughter of a Alexander Marbourg, a Johnstown merchant. After struggling his health, Keedy began studying medicine at University of Pennsylvania and graduated in New York in 1863. He practiced medicine for seven years in Iowa.

In 1875, Keedy became president of the Hagerstown Female Seminary, purchasing the institution three years later from Charles W. Humrichhouse. In 1889, the school was renamed Kee Mar College. The name is based on the first three letters of Keedy's name and the first three letters of his wife's maiden name, Marburg. While serving as president, nearly 400 women graduated from the institution and several thousand students had taken courses. Ten years before his death, he sold the college to a company. He had served as owner and president for 25 years.

After years of poor health, Keedy died of heart disease on March 25, 1911, in his home in Hagerstown, Maryland. He was survived by his wife, 2 sons, and 2 daughters.
