= Arapapıştı Canyon =

- Arapapıştı Kanyonu
- Location within Turkey
- Length: 6 km (3.7 mi)
- Depth: 380 m (1,250 ft)

Geology
- Type: Canyon

Geography
- Location: Bozdoğan, Aydın Province, Turkey
- Coordinates: 37°31′24.8″N 28°34′46″E
- Rivers: Akçay
- Interactive map of Arapapıştı Canyon

Arapapıştı Canyon (Turkish: Arapapıştı Kanyonu) is a canyon in Bozdoğan district of Aydın Province in western Turkey.

It is a canyon formed by the Akçay River that feeds Kemer Dam. The length of the canyon is 6 kilometres, and its height is 380 metres. A part of the canyon is located on the border of Aydın, Denizli and Muğla provinces. In 2017, it was opened to tourism by Aydın Metropolitan Municipality.
