= Mario Algaze =

Cuban-American photojournalist (1947–2022)

- Born: 1947; Havana, Cuba
- Died: 28 September 2022 (aged 75); Florida, U.S.
- Website: http://www.marioalgaze.com

Mario Algaze (1947 – 28 September 2022) was a Cuban-American photographer who photographed musicians and celebrities, in rural and urban areas, throughout Latin America.

== Early life ==
Algaze was exiled from Cuba in 1960, when he was 13 years old and moved to Miami. Self-taught in photography, he enrolled to study art at Miami Dade College, Florida in the 1970s and went on to work as a freelance photojournalist for national and international publications including the Miami Herald.

== Career ==
Starting work as a photojournalist in 1971, Algaze went often to Latin America, and the Caribbean (including his native Cuba) to make photographs. From 1979 to 1981 he was the director of the Gallery Exposures in Coral Gables, Florida. During the 1970s he photographed Mick Jagger, Paul McCartney and Frank Zappa. In 1992 Algaze, who previously had developed his photographs in the bathroom, was one of 71 visual artists working in photography and crafts awarded Visual Artists Fellowships of $20,000. He used the fellowship to install a darkroom in his home in which to create 86 exhibition-quality images.

== Reception ==
In 1983 Ricardo Pau-Llosa wrote that:

The kind of photograph which Algaze pursues is more than a frozen image, the souvenir of flux, a stay of mutability. These photographs reveal the spirit of a moment in human space (the "subjects are usually human beings, cities, streets, walls, plazas, rooms, shops, artifacts) as much as the workings of consciousness that graps [sic] this spirit. [...] His is not a tourist's eye giddy with compassion for fallen places. What comes through in his photographs is not simply the arduous predicament of life in Latin America, but the unique scenarios in which life reveals itslef [sic] in this part of the world.

Museum of Photographic Arts (MoPA) curator Carol McCusker wrote of Algaze that he "steadily built a sum view of Spanish-speaking countries that no other photographer has done before or since." Curator Jorge Zamanillo remarked that many of Algaze's photographs "evoke the cinematographic spirit that Fellini's films have."

In Mario Algaze: Portfolio Latino Americano, his friend and colleague, curator Ricardo Viera interpreted his photography as pervasively revealing the often contradictory layering of cultures in Latin and South America.

Benjamin R. Fraser, Editor-in-Chief of Hispania, perceiving that a 'magic realism;' a Latin idyll, is read into, or imposed on, Algaze's oeuvre, writes in 2004 that "one may somehow suspect that even Algaze's role is not neutral," and "that there might be self-tropicalization on his part," in his exclusion of modern, industrial artefacts and goods from his imagery.

Vince Aletti surveyed his work in A Respect for Light: The Latin American Photographs, 1974-2008 published in 2014, and notes in his foreword that Algaze's theme is "Latin America, both as a place and a state of mind."

Algaze returned to his homeland Cuba in 1999 after nearly four decades in exile; curator and writer Elizabeth Ferrer attributes Algaze's project to photograph across South America to a nostalgic desire to find "echoes of a beloved Cuba in the old quarters of Latin American cities."

In 2022 Algaze died in Florida on 28 September.

== Individual exhibitions ==
- 1974, 29 October–8 November: Mario Algaze Exhibit. Bacardi Art Gallery, Miami, FL
- 1977, from 21 October:17 Color Prints. Sociedad Española de la Florida, 800 Douglas Road, Coral Gables, Miami, FL
- 1983 – Light Factory, Charlotte, North Carolina
- 1983 – Spirit of Place, Miami Dade Community College, North Campus, Art Gallery, Miami, FL (traveled to Lehigh University Art Gallery, Bethlehem, PA in 1984)
- 1984 – Little Havana Series, Barbara Gillman Gallery, Miami, FL
- 1984 – Fifteen Recent Images, Coral Gables Public Library, Coral Gables, FL
- 1985 – The Artist as a Theme, INTAR Latin American Art Gallery, New York, NY
- 1986 – Portraits, Miami Film Festival, Cuban Museum, Miami, FL
- 1986 – Portraits, Latin American Intellectuals, Books and Books, Coral Gables, FL
- 1987 – El Sur, Miami Dade Community College, North Campus, Art Gallery, Miami, FL
- 1989 – Caras, Cuban Museum of Arts and Culture, Miami, FL
- 1989 – 45 Imágenes, Museo de Antioquía, Medellín, Colombia
- 1989 – El Sur, Fundación del Banco del Comercio, Lima, Perú
- 1991 – Portafolio Latinoamericano, curated by Ricardo Viera, opened at the Guayasamín Foundation, Quito, Ecuador (traveled to Lowe Art Museum, Coral Gables, FL; Art Galleries of Lehigh University, Bethlehem, PA; Museo Rayo, Roldanillo Valle, Colombia; Art Museum of the Miami University, Oxford, OH, Norton Gallery of Art, West Palm Beach, FL)
- 1991 – An Exercise in color, Barbara Gillman Gallery, Miami, FL
- 1991 – 40 Images, L'Alliance Française au Perú, Lima, Perú
- 1992 – Film Festival Portraits, Ambrosino Gallery, Coral Gables, FL
- 1993 – Portafolio Latinoamericano, 2. Internacionale Fototage, Herten, Germany. Sponsored by AGFA and curated by Michael Koetzle
- 1995 – Solo exhibition at the Fundación Guayasamín, Quito, Ecuador. Sponsored by the Alliance Française
- 1997 – Portafolio Latinoamericano, Throckmorton Fine Arts Gallery. New York, NY
- 1998 – Sur, Freites Revilla Gallery, Coral Gables, FL
- 1999 – Sur, Throckmorton Fine Arts Gallery. New York, NY
- 1999 – Sur, John Cleary Gallery. Houston, TX
- 1999 – Sur, Peter Fetterman Photographic Works of Art, Santa Monica, CA
- 2001 – Cuba 1999-2000, Throckmorton Fine Art Gallery, New York, NY
- 2001 – Cuba 1999-2000, Books and Books, Coral Cables, FL
- 2002 – CUBA 1999-2000, Lowe Art Museum, University of Miami, Coral Gables, FL
- 2003 – Mario Algaze, Cuba 1999-2000, University of California, San Diego, CA
- 2004 – Selections from Three Decades of Work, Missing Link Gallery, Sarasota
- 2005 – Southern Exposure, Barbara Gillman Gallery, Miami, FL

== Group exhibitions ==
- 1978, from 11 August: Mario Algaze, Margarita Cano, Oscar Manuel Melian, photographs. Forma, 305 Alcazar, Coral Gables
- 1978 – 'Displaced Cuban Photographers'. Washington Projects for The Arts, Washington, D.C.
- 1978 – Camerawork Gallery, San Francisco, California
- 1979 – Cuban Photographers, Washington Project for the Arts, Washington DC (traveled to Camerawork, San Francisco, CA)
- 1984 – Hortt Memorial Exhibition. Museum Of Art, Ft. Lauderdale, FL
- 1985 – The Art of Miami, SECCA Winston-Salem, NCGroup Exhibition of Gallery Artists at Gemini Gallery, Palm Beach, FL
- 1987 – Outside Cuba/Fuera de Cuba Zimmerli Museum, Rutgers University, New Brunswick, NJ (traveled to Museum of Contemporary Hispanic Art, New York, NY; Art Museum, Miami University, Miami, OH; Museo de Arte de Ponce, Puerto Rico; Center for the Fine Arts, Miami, FL; Atlanta College of Fine Arts, Atlanta, GA)
- 1987 – Poetic Visions. Real Art Ways Space, Hartford, CT
- 1987 – Contemporary Figurative American Photography, Center For The Fine Arts, Miami. FL
- 1987 – Intentions and Techniques, Lehigh University. Bethlehem, PA
- 1988 – Of People and Places, Milwaukee Art Museum, Milwaukee, WI (traveled to the Tampa Museum of Art in 1989)
- 1988 – Photo Glimpses of Hispanic Culture, Boward Community College, Art Gallery, FL
- 1988 – The Image Makers, Museum of Modern Art of Latin America, Washington, DC
- 1988 – Eight from Outside of Cuba, Barbara Gillman, Miami, FL
- 1989 – South Florida in the Eighties, North Miami Center Of Contemporary Art, North Miami, FL
- 1989 - Four Florida Photographers, Stein-Gillman Gallery, Tampa, FL
- 1989 – Six in Florida, North Miami Museum Of Art, North Miami, FL
- 1990 – Twenty-Five in Miami, Art Gallery, Miami Dade Community College, South Campus, Miami, FL
- 1990 – Fact and Fiction: The State of Florida Photography, Norton Gallery of Art, West Palm Beach, FL (traveled to Museum Of Fine Arts, St. Petersburg, FL; Florida State University Fine Arts Gallery and Museum, Tallahassee, FL; Center for the Fine Arts, Miami. FL; Pensacola Museum of Art, Pensacola, FL)
- 1991 – Cuba-USA: First Generation, curated by Fondo del Sol Gallery, Washington, DC, opened at Museum of Contemporary Art, Chicago, IL (traveled to Art Museum, Florida International University, Miami, FL, Minnesota Museum of Art, St. Paul, MN)
- 1991 – Traveling, Dunedin Fine Art Center, Dunedin, FL
- 1991 – Directors Choice, South Florida Cultural Consortium Artist Fellowship Recipients, Norton Gallery of Art, West Palm Beach, FL
- 1991 – Other Times, Other Places, Main Public Library, Miami, FL
- 1992 – 1991 SAF/NEA Regional Fellowships In Photography, Savannah College of Art and Design, Savannah, GA
- 1994 – Portafolio Latinoamericano, Houston Fotofest, Houston, TX. Curated by Ricardo Viera, State University. Curated by Tom Callas and Linda Centell
- 1995 – Magic Moments: 40 Years of Leica M, traveled to New York, Paris, Milano, Tokyo, Cologne, Bath, Vienna, Montreux, Luxembourg, Oslo, Beirut, Frankfurt
- 1995 – Cintas Fellowship Exhibition, Southeastern Center for Photography, Daytona Beach, FL
- 1997 - American Voices, Smithsonian International Gallery, Washington, DC. Curated by Ricardo Viera
- 1997 – Once Removed: The Photograph in Contemporary Cuban-American Art, California
- 1999 – Theater of the Memory, Five Cuban American Artist Photographers, Centro Cultural Español, Miami, FL. Curated by Ricardo Viera
- 2000 – Latin American Photographers, El Museo Del Barrio, New York, NY. Curated by Ricardo Viera
- 2001 – 'A Painting for Over the Sofa (that's not necessarily a painting)'; Bernice Steinbaum Gallery, Miami, Florida.
- 2001 – Del Sur, Miami Dade Public Library system, Miami, FL. Curated by Barbara Young
- 2002 – One Hundred Photographs, A collection by Bruce Bernard, Victoria and Albert Museum, London, England
- 2002 – Three Visions of Perú, Throckmorton Fine Art Gallery, New York, NY. Traveled to MOPA, San Diego, California
- 2003 – Three Visions of Perú, Throckmorton Fine Art Gallery, New York, NY
- 2004 – 100 Great Photographs, Victoria and Albert Museum, Traveled to Scottish National Gallery of Modern Art, England

== Awards ==
- 1980 – Best in Show Award, Art Auction, WPBT Channel 2; Miami, Florida
- 1992 – National Endowment for the Arts (photography), U.S.A.

== Public and corporate collections ==
- MOPA, San Diego, California
- Museum of Fine Arts, Houston, Texas
- Museo Cuevas, Mexico City
- Museo Rayo, Roldanillo, Colombia
- Milwaukee Art Museum, WI
- Museo Tamayo, Mexico City
- Santa Barbara Museum, CA
- Archer M. Huntington Art Gallery, University of Texas/Austin
- Norton Gallery of Art, West Palm Beach, FL
- Museo de Antioquía, Medellín, Colombia
- Fundación Guayasamín, Quito, Ecuador
- Jane Voorhees Zimmerli Art Museum, Rutgers University, NJ
- Lehigh University, Bethleham, PA
- Ft. Lauderdale Art Museum, Ft. Lauderdale, FL
- Lowe Art Museum, University of Miami, Coral Gables, FL
- Miami University, Miami, OH
- Art in Public Places, State of FL
- Art in Public Places. Miami, FL
- Miami Public Library System
- L'Alliance Française au Pérou, Lima, Perú
- Eastman Pharmaceuticals, PA
- American Express, Latin American-Caribbean Division
- General Dynamics, Virginia, US
- Citicorp, Miami, FL
- Royal Caribbean International, Holland
- Southeast Museum of Photography, Daytona Beach Community College, Daytona Beach, FL
- Cintas Foundation Collection, Florida International University
- Leica, Solms, Germany
- The New York Public Library
- The Chase Manhattan Bank, N.A. New York, NY
- The Sprint Collection, New York, NY
- A.G. Edwards and Sons, St. Louis, MO
- U.P.S. Atlanta, GA
- Nortel, Latinamerican, Caribbean Division
- Carrier Latinamerican Caribbean Division
- LaSalle National Bank, Chicago, IL
- Ignacio Oberto Collection, Caracas, Venezuela
- Howard Gittis Collection, New York, NY
- Martin Margulies Collection, Miami, FL
- University of California, San Diego, CA
- DePaul University, Chicago, IL
- Luis Gutierrez, PSC, Architecture and Design Puerto Rico
- Morgan Stanley, Dean Witter, NYC
- MacAndrews & Forbes Holdings, Inc. NYC
- Fundación Daniela Chappard, Caracas, Venezuela
- The Providence Group, Providence, RI
- Cleveland Museum of Art

== Bibliography ==
- Mario Algaze, Michael Koetzle, & Enrique Fernandez; Portfolio Latinoamericano, (Kehayoff Verlag, 1998); ISBN 978-3-929078-66-4
- Jose Veigas-Zamora, Cristina Vives Gutierrez, Adolfo V. Nodal, Valia Garzon, Dannys Montes de Oca; Memoria: Cuban Art of the 20th Century; (California/International Arts Foundation 2001); ISBN 978-0-917571-11-4
- Jose Viegas; Memoria: Artes Visuales Cubanas Del Siglo Xx; (California Intl Arts 2004); ISBN 978-0-917571-12-1
- Helen D. Hume; The Art Teacher's Book of Lists; (Jossey-Bass 2003); ISBN 978-0-7879-7424-4
