= J. Emory Shaw =

American opera singer

President of Kee Mar College
- In office 1906–1907

Personal details
- Born: J. Emory D. Shaw; 1863 Baltimore, Maryland, US
- Died: June 10, 1943 Paris, Texas, US
- Children: 2
- Occupation: Musician, educator, academic administrator

J. Emory D. Shaw (1863 – June 10, 1943) was an American musician, educator, and academic administrator. He served as the musical director of Wilson College, president of Kee Mar College, and director of fine arts at Southwestern University.

== Early life and education ==
J. Emory Shaw was born in Baltimore in 1863, the son of Greenbury Washington Shaw, a sailmaker, and Ann Eliza Travers. He began to study the piano at the age of 15, and at 19 he took up vocal instruction for which he had the strongest predilection. At his parents' request, he continued studying piano and theory. Shaw received private instruction at home and abroad.

== Career ==
Shaw relocated to Richmond, Virginia. There, he became director of the Philharmonic Orchestra and Southern Women's College. Later, he became musical director of Wilson College. Shaw retired as musical director in 1905. He served as organist of the Falling Spring Presbyterian Church from 1895 to 1905. In 1906, Shaw became president of Kee Mar College. By November 1906, he reported issues with nervous prostration. Shaw resigned in April 1907 due to his health issues. Shaw was the head master and teacher of voice and organ in the Paris Texas School of Singing and Organ Instruction. In 1912, Shaw became director of fine arts at Southwestern University. He was also the director of the choir of the First Methodist church in Georgetown, Texas. Shaw was a vocalist specialized in voice culture, conductor, and organist. He was experienced in orchestra and the art of instrumentation. For a short time, Shaw was a baritone of the Boston Ideal Opera Company. He produced an opera that was well received by the press and public. While Shaw has written a number of songs and sacred pieces, he devoted most of his time to composing larger instrumental forms.

In 1935, Shaw received an honorary Ll.D. from Trinity University in recognition of his service to his field.

== Personal life ==
Shaw's first wife, Mary Augusta Deady, was a noted vocalist. They had two children who survived to adulthood, Mrs. Ralph Mason (Olga) of La Porte, Texas and E. Winfred Shaw of Cleveland Ohio. Shaw died the morning of June 10, 1943, age 79, in Paris, Texas. He is buried at Evergreen Cemetery in Paris, Texas.

Shaw built a home on Montgomery Ave., Chambersburg, PA, breaking ground in 1902 and moving into it March, 1903.
