= Campeonato Argentino de Clubes de Básquet =

Basketball championship in Argentina

Campeonato Argentino de Clubes
- Organising body: CABB
- Founded: 1936; 90 years ago
- Folded: 1984; 42 years ago
- Replaced by: Liga Nacional de Básquet
- Country: Argentina
- Divisions: 1
- Level on pyramid: 1
- Relegation to: Primera B
- Most championships: Obras Sanitarias (3)

The Campeonato Argentino de Clubes de Básquet (English: Argentine Championship of Basketball Clubs) was the top-tier level division professional basketball championship in Argentina, until 1984, when it was replaced by the Liga Nacional de Básquet (LNB).

== History ==
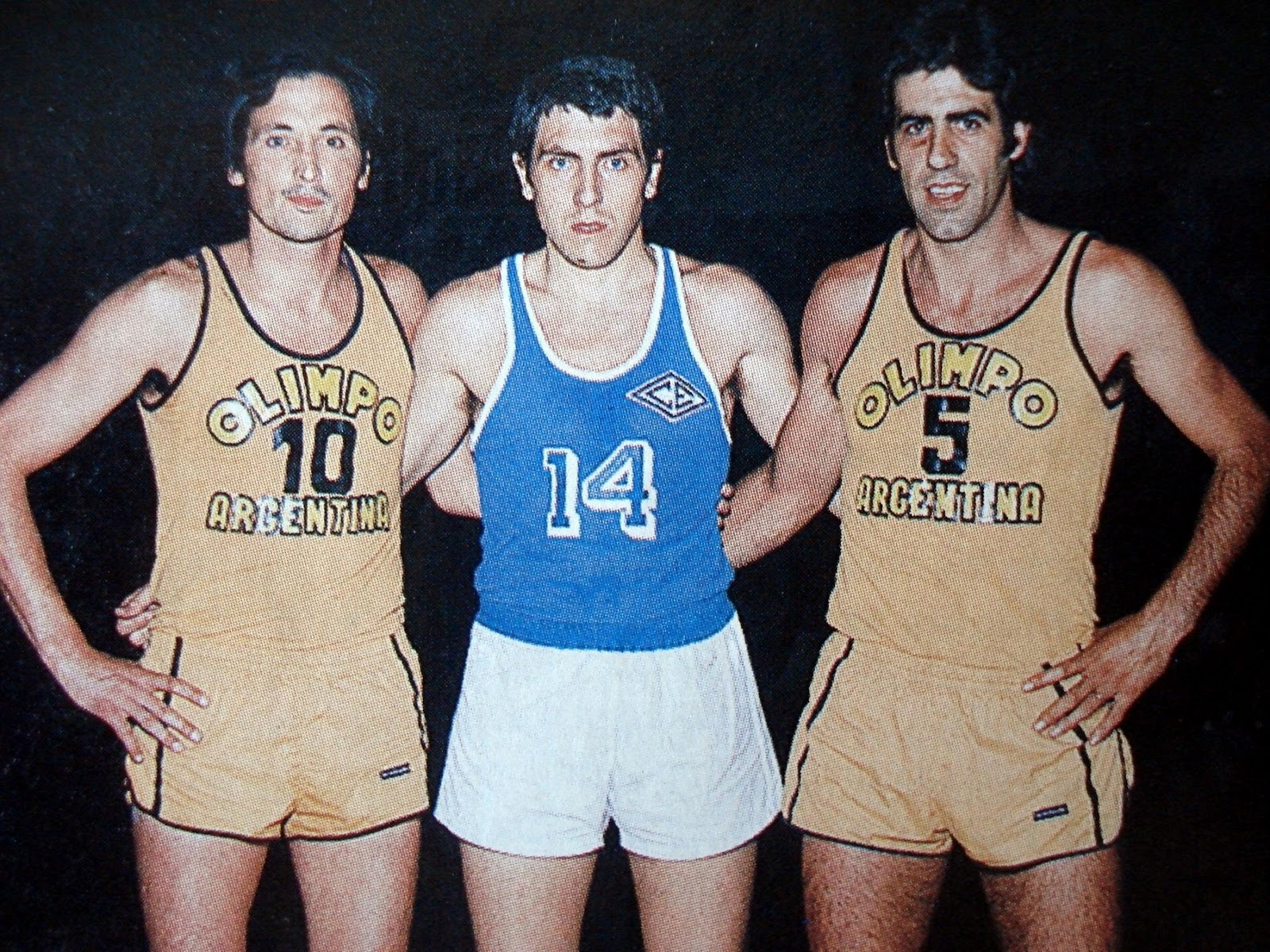
Atilio Fruet, Alberto Cabrera and José De Lizaso, who played for the "Bahiense" teams Olimpo and Estudiantes respectively. They were nicknamed, The Three Musketeers of basketball, in the 1960s.

The competition was established in 1936, with the purpose of organizing a basketball competition for men's clubs. Until then, there was only a tournament where provincial sides took part, as a part of local leagues, such as the Torneo Metropolitano, for teams of Buenos Aires.

The Campeonato Argentino was organised by the Argentine Basketball Confederation (CABB), with the first two editions being played on the YMCA's clay courts, in Buenos Aires. After four editions were held in Buenos Aires, the Campeonato Argentino was also played in Córdoba, Mendoza, Rosario, Tucumán, San Juan, Salta, and Jujuy. In 1939, the CA was held in Bahía Blanca (renamed "the capital of Argentine basketball"), with 15 teams taking part in it.

The last edition of the competition was held in 1984, and was won by Deportivo San Andrés, a club from General San Martín Partido, after they defeated River Plate in the finals.

Boca Juniors, Obras Sanitarias, Lanús, and San Lorenzo, are the only current LNB teams that won the CA championship at least once.

== Champions ==
Year	Team
1936	Huracán (Rosario)
1938	Gimnasia y Esgrima (Santa Fe)
1939	Gimnasia y Esgrima (Santa Fe)
1941	Juventud BBC (SdE)
1943	Unión (SF)
1958	San Lorenzo
1959	INTI
1960	Juventud BBC (SdE)
1961	Hindú (Resistencia)
1963	Boca Juniors
1965	Tomás de Rocamora (ER)
1968	Almagro (Esperanza)
1969	Unión (SF)
1974	Olimpo (BB)
1975	Obras Sanitarias
1976	Obras Sanitarias
1977	Lanús
1978	Olimpo (BB)
1979	Gimnasia y Esgrima (LP)
1980	Gimnasia y Esgrima (LP)
1981	Ferro Carril Oeste
1982	Obras Sanitarias
1983	River Plate
1984	Deportivo San Andrés

== Titles by club ==
Titles	Team	Years won
3	Obras Sanitarias	1975, 1976, 1982
2	Gimnasia y Esgrima (SF)	1938, 1939
2	Olimpo (BB)	1974, 1978
2	Unión (SF)	1943, 1969
2	Juventud BBC (SdE)	1941, 1960
2	Gimnasia y Esgrima (LP)	1979, 1980
1	Huracán (Rosario)	1936
1	San Lorenzo	1958
1	INTI	1959
1	Hindú (Resistencia)	1961
1	Boca Juniors	1963
1	Tomás de Rocamora	1965
1	Almagro (Esperanza)	1968
1	Lanús	1977
1	Ferro Carril Oeste	1981
1	River Plate	1983
1	Deportivo San Andrés	1984
