= Ciego de Ávila =

City in Cuba

Ciego de Avila
- Municipality
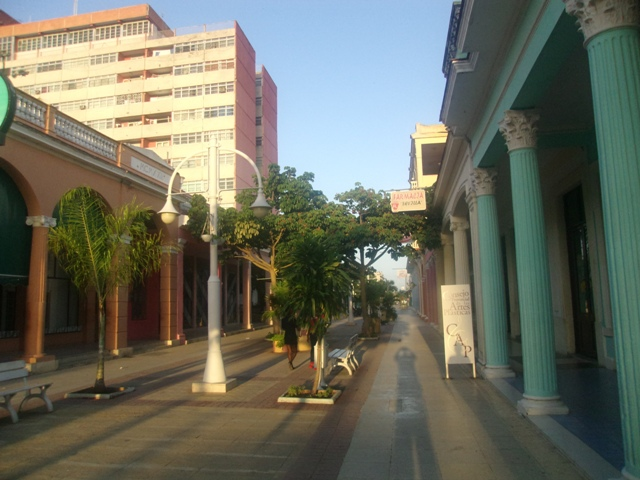
- Boulevard in Ciego de Ávila

- Coat of arms

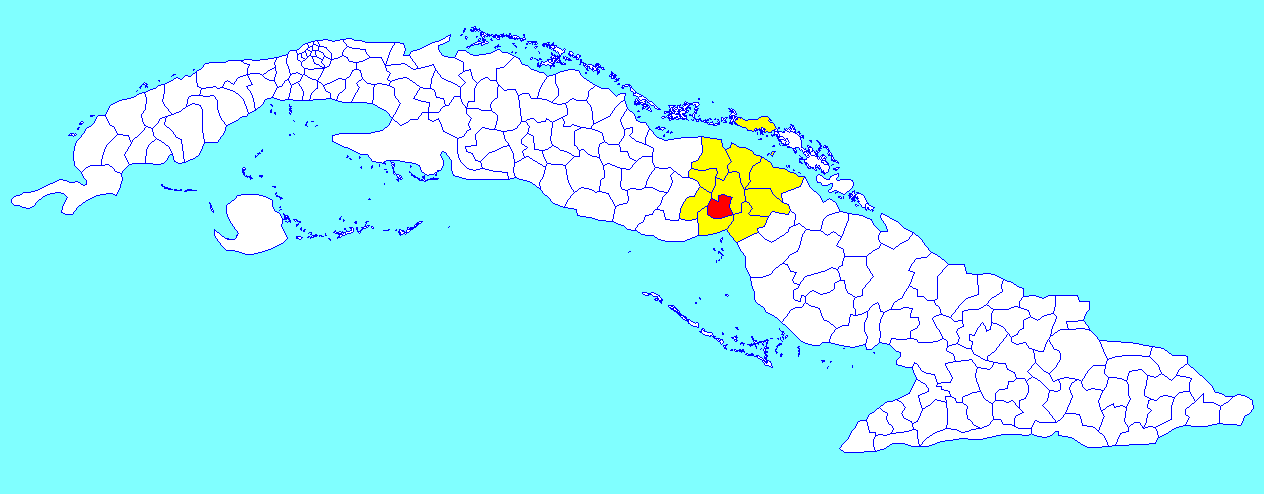
- Ciego de Ávila municipality (red) within (Cuba)
- Coordinates: 21°50′53″N 78°45′47″W
- Country: Cuba
- Province: Ciego de Ávila
- Established: 1840

Government
  - President: Viviana Martínez Cárdenas

Area
  - Municipality: 450 km^{2} (170 sq mi)
- Elevation: 55 m (180 ft)

Population (2022)
  - Municipality: 156,322
  - Density: 350/km^{2} (900/sq mi)
  - Urban: 131,551
  - Rural: 24,771
- Demonym: Avileño/a
- Time zone: UTC-5 (EST)
- Postal code: 65200
- Area code: +53 43
- Highways: Carretera Central

Ciego de Ávila (Spanish pronunciation: [ˈsjeɣo ðe ˈaβila]) is a city in the central part of Cuba and the capital of Ciego de Ávila Province. The capital city has a population of about 156,322 and the province 430,507.

== Geography ==
Ciego de Ávila lies on the Carretera Central highway and on a major railroad. Its port, Júcaro, lies 24 km (15 mi) south-southwest on the coast of the Gulf of Ana Maria of the Caribbean Sea, in the adjacent municipality of Venezuela. The city is located about 460 km (290 mi) east of Havana and 110 km (68 mi) west of the city of Camagüey. It was part of the Camagüey Province until 1976, when Fidel Castro's government made Ciego de Ávila the capital of the newly created Ciego de Ávila Province.

By 1945, the municipality was divided into the barrios of Angel Castillo, Ceballos, Guanales, Jagüeyal, Jicotea, José Miguel Gómez, Júcaro, La Ceiba, Majagua, Norte, San Nicolás and Sur. After the new political and administrative division of Cuba in 1976, it was divided into four municipalities (Majagua, Ciego de Ávila, Baragua, and Venezuela).

=== Climate ===
Ciego de Ávila experiences a tropical savanna climate (Köppen Aw).

Climate data for Ciego de Ávila
Month	Jan	Feb	Mar	Apr	May	Jun	Jul	Aug	Sep	Oct	Nov	Dec	Year
Mean daily maximum °C (°F)	27.3 (81.1)	28.1 (82.6)	29.9 (85.8)	31.3 (88.3)	31.9 (89.4)	32.1 (89.8)	33.1 (91.6)	33.3 (91.9)	32.5 (90.5)	31.0 (87.8)	29.9 (85.8)	27.9 (82.2)	30.7 (87.2)
Mean daily minimum °C (°F)	17.2 (63.0)	17.1 (62.8)	18.8 (65.8)	20.0 (68.0)	21.5 (70.7)	22.8 (73.0)	23.3 (73.9)	23.3 (73.9)	22.6 (72.7)	21.8 (71.2)	20.4 (68.7)	18.0 (64.4)	20.6 (69.0)
Average rainfall mm (inches)	31 (1.2)	28 (1.1)	41 (1.6)	82 (3.2)	181 (7.1)	191 (7.5)	135 (5.3)	142 (5.6)	187 (7.4)	177 (7.0)	66 (2.6)	30 (1.2)	1,291 (50.8)
Source: CLIMATE-DATA.ORG

== History ==
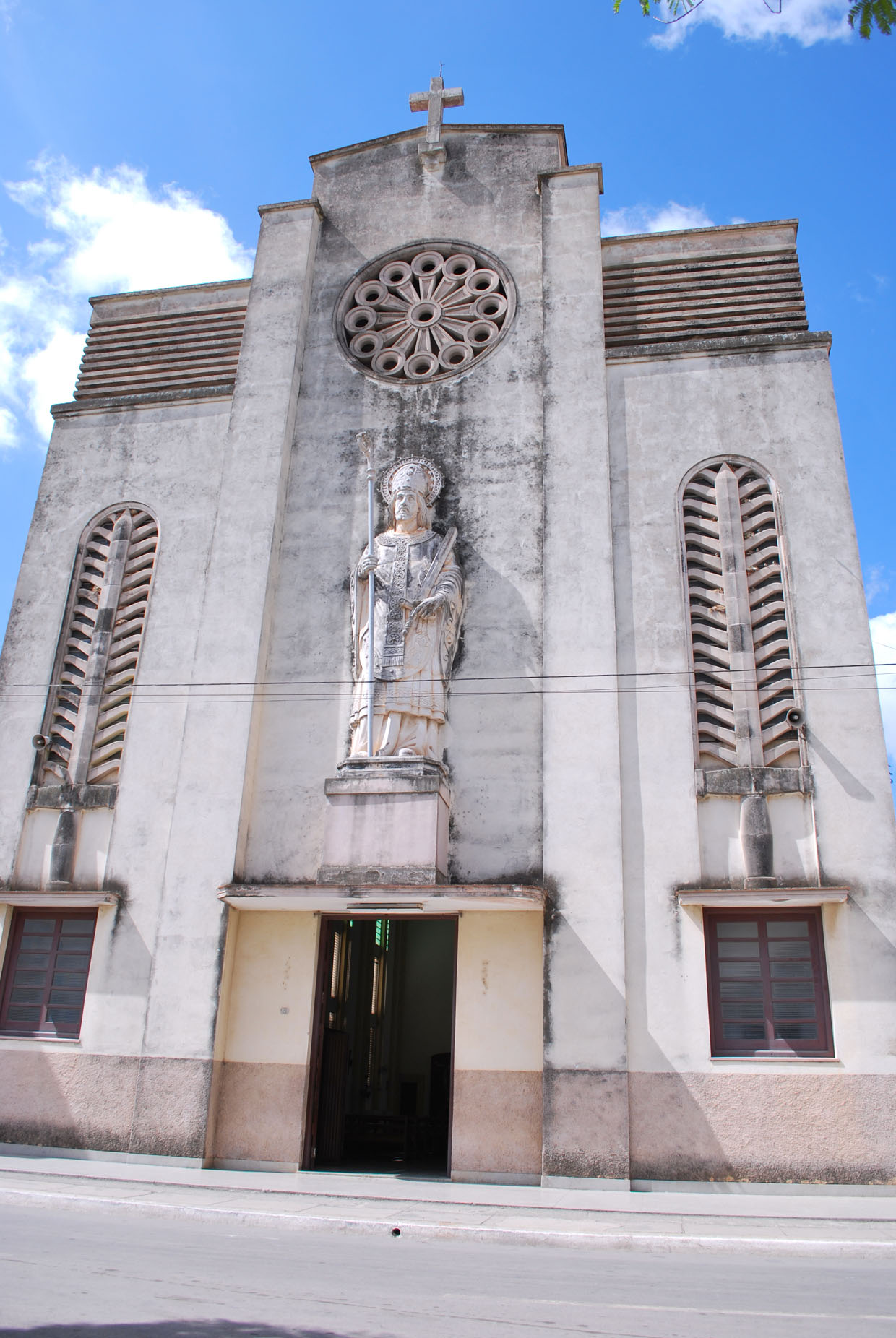
St. Eugene (San Eugenio) Cathedral

The city of Ciego de Ávila was founded by 1840, having at the time 263 inhabitants. In 1877, its municipal government was created and the city became independent of the city of Morón. Ciego de Ávila gained importance when the Spanish army built a fortified military line, known as Trocha de Júcaro a Morón, to impede the pass of insurrectionist forces to the western part of the island during the 1st War of Independence (1868–1878). This "trocha", which made this region famous, was thought to be strong enough to stop the Cuban forces, but was not able to stop the pass of General Máximo Gómez and several hundred men. Many of the old Spanish colonial buildings in Ciego de Ávila (such as the Teatro Principal) were commissioned under Angela Hernández, viuda de Jiménez, a rich socialite who battled to create a cultural mecca in her hometown.

== Demographics ==
In 2022, the Municipality of Ciego de Ávila had a population of 156,322. With a total area of 445 km^{2} (172 sq mi), it has a population density of 350/km^{2} (910/sq mi).

== Attractions ==
- Parque de la Ciudad is the largest park in the city of Ciego de Ávila.
- Parque de Marti is the central meeting grounds for people downtown.
- Teatro Principal is a 500-seat theatre located just a few blocks from Parque Martí.
- University of Ciego de Ávila (Universidad de Ciego de Ávila, UNICA) is the province's secondary education institution.
- IPVCE Ignacio Agramonte Instituto Pre-Universitario Vocacional de Ciencias Exactas (10 a 12 grado) con emphasis en las ciencias basicas: Fisica, Quimica, Matematica, Biologia y Electronica. Se encuentra en la carretera a Ceballos.
- la Turbina is a small amusement park located to the north west of the city with approximately 6 rides.

== Media ==
Its present radio station, Radio Surco (previously Radio Cuba), was founded October 10, 1952.

== Sports ==
Ciego de Ávila's basketball team has been one of the most successful teams in the country, as it has won 9 national championships since 2005.

== Transportation ==
The city is served by Máximo Gómez Airport.

== Notable residents ==
- Andy Morales (b. 1974, Major League Baseball player
- Tony Pérez (b. 1942), Major League Baseball player
- Rusney Castillo (b. 1987), Major League Baseball player
- William Granda (b. 1985), member of Cuba's national basketball team
- Adolis García (b. 1993), member of Texas Rangers (baseball)

== See also ==
- Municipalities of Cuba
- List of cities in Cuba
