= Kemer Dam =

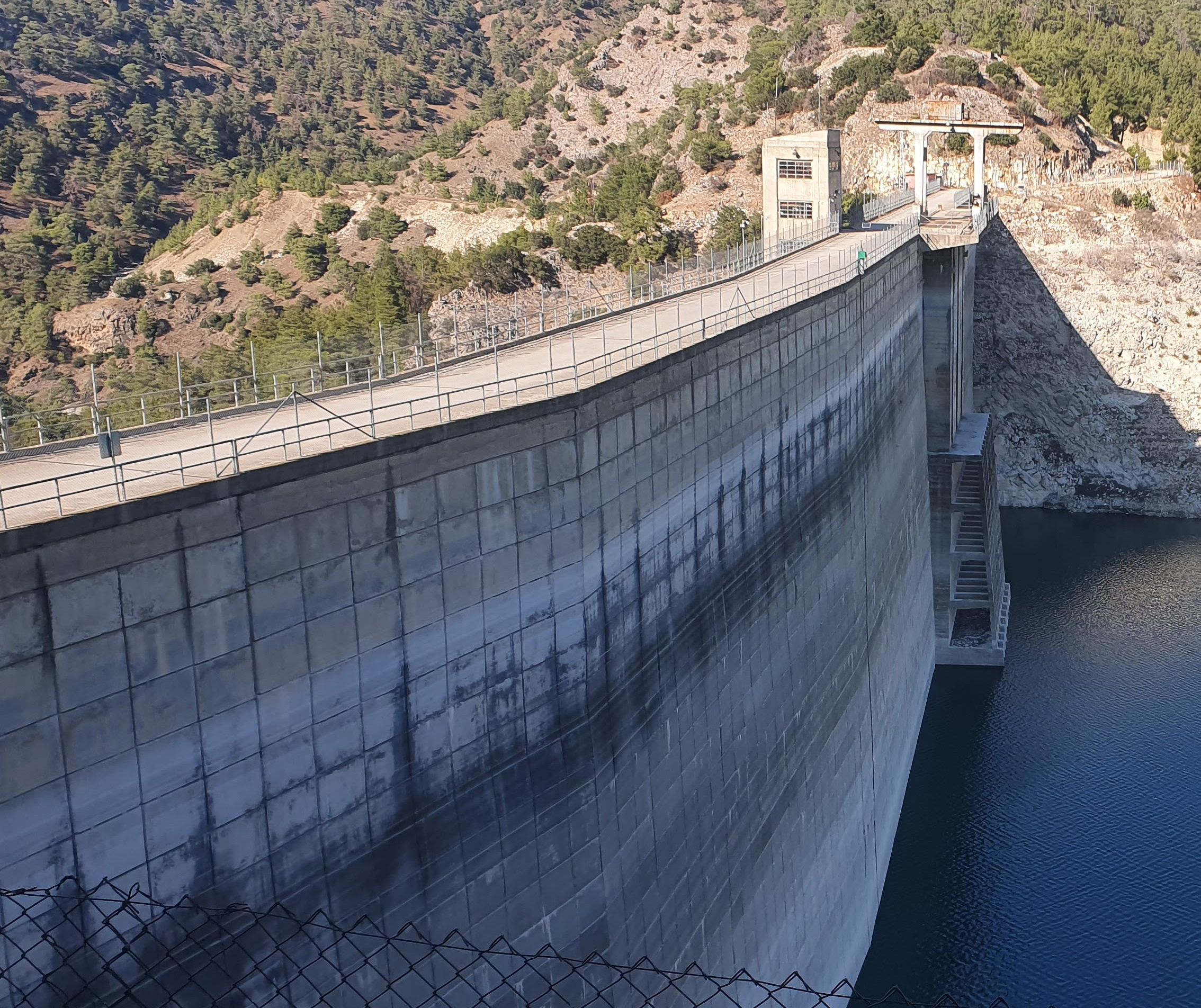
- Interactive map of Kemer Dam
- Official name: Kemer Barajı
- Location: Bozdoğan, Aydın, Turkey
- Coordinates: 37.5718°N 28.5246°E
- Construction began: 1954
- Opening date: September 25, 1958 (67 years ago)

Dam and spillways
- Height: 108 m (354 ft)

Reservoir
- Creates: Kemer Reservoir
- Total capacity: 419 ha (1,040 acres)

Power Station
- Installed capacity: 48 MW
- Annual generation: 150 GWh

Kemer Dam is a dam in Bozdoğan, Aydın, Turkey, built between 1954 and 1958. The development was backed by the Turkish State Hydraulic Works. The dam was privatized in 2016. In 2017, Aydın Metropolitan Municipality decided to open the Arapapıştı Canyon, which is connected to the dam, to tourists.

== See also ==
- List of dams and reservoirs in Turkey
