= Kemmerer =

Kemmerer may refer to:

== Places in the United States ==
- Kemmerer, Wyoming, a city
- Kemmerer High School, a high school in Kemmerer, Wyoming
- Kemmerer House, a historic home in Emmaus, Pennsylvania
- Kemmerer Hotel, a former historic hotel in Kemmerer, Wyoming
- Kemmerer Municipal Airport, an airport in Kemmerer, Wyoming

== People ==
- Beatrice Kemmerer (1930–2013), American baseball player
- Brigid Kemmerer (born 1978), American author
- Connie Kemmerer, American businesswoman
- Ed Kemmer (1921–2014), born Edward Kemmerer, American actor
- Edwin W. Kemmerer (1875–1945), American economist
- Jay Kemmerer (born 1947), American businessman
- Lisa Kemmerer, American academic
- Russ Kemmerer (1930–2013), American baseball player

== See also ==
- Kemerer (disambiguation)
