= Annie S. Kemerer =

Annie S. Kemerer (1865–1951) was an art collector who founded the Kemerer Museum of Decorative Arts in Bethlehem, Pennsylvania, upon her death in 1951.

Annie Grim (Kemerer) was one of three daughters born in 1865 to Ellen Fogel Grim and Jacob Grim whose parents owned the Grim farm, which is now part of the Saucon Valley Country Club, where their home serves as the clubhouse. Kemerer enrolled at Hackettstown Academy in New Jersey and then Hagerstown Female Seminary, a Lutheran school, in Maryland. In 1890, she married Albert Kemerer, the son of State Senator Jacob Kemerer, who employed Albert in the real estate division of his law firm. The Kemerers lived on W. Broad Street near the movie theater. The Kemerers had one son who served stateside during World War I, but committed suicide in 1921.

Albert Kemerer died in 1927, and after his death Annie Kemerer became more reclusive but continued to acquire a large collection of antiques until her death in 1951 at age 85. She bequeathed her $300,000 and her collection to start a decorative arts museum which became the Kemerer Museum in 1954.
