= Ciego de Ávila (basketball) =

Ciego de Avila
- Nickname: Búfalos (Buffaloos)
- Leagues: Liga Superior de Baloncesto (LSB)
- Founded: 2004
- History: Ciego de Ávila (2004–present)
- Arena: Sala Polivalente Giraldo Cordova Cardin
- Location: Ciego de Ávila, Cuba
- Championships: 10 (2005, 2006, 2007, 2008, 2009, 2012, 2013, 2013, 2016, 2022

Ciego de Ávila, nicknamed Búfalos, is a Cuban professional basketball team located in Ciego de Ávila.

The team has been competing in the Cuban Liga Superior de Baloncesto (LSB) since 2004 and has won a record 10 championships.

== Honours ==
Liga Superior de Baloncesto

- Champions (10): 2004–05, 2005–06, 2006–07, 2007–08, 2008–09, 2011–12, 2012–13, 2013, 2016, 2022

== Notable players ==
Note: Flags indicate national team eligibility at FIBA-sanctioned events. Players may hold other non-FIBA nationalities not displayed.

Criteria

To appear in this section a player must have either:

- Set a club record or won an individual award while at the club
- Played at least one official international match for their national team at any time
- Played at least one official NBA match at any time.

- (Cuba) Yoel Cubilla
- (Cuba) William Granda
- (Cuba) Joan Luis Haiti
- (Cuba) Yaser Rodriguez
