= Guantánamo CB =

Guantánamo CB is a professional basketball club that is based in Guantánamo, Cuba. The club competes in the Cuban League.

Guantánamo CB competed at the 1985 edition of the Intercontinental Cup.
