= Kemerer Museum of Decorative Arts =

Museum in Belhlehem, Pennsylvania

Coordinates: 40°37′10″N 75°22′44″W

Kemerer Museum of Decorative Arts is a decorative arts museum at 427 N. New Street in Bethlehem, Pennsylvania run by Historic Bethlehem. The Kemerer Museum is housed in three mid-nineteenth century houses, which are interconnected. Founded in 1951 the Kemerer Museum is the only decorative arts museum in Pennsylvania, and one of only fifteen nationwide devoted exclusively to decorative arts.

== History ==
The Kemerer Museum of Decorative Arts is named after Annie S. Kemerer (1865–1951), a reclusive collector of antiques, furniture, paintings, and other decorative objects, who left her collection to the City of Bethlehem to start a museum after her death. With $300,000 from Kemerer and her collection, the Annie S. Kemerer Museum Association was founded in 1954.

In the 1960s William J. Murtagh, the first keeper of the Records for the National Register of Historic Places, served as a president of the museum. The museum has featured exhibitions by notable artists, including Ricardo Viera.
