= Liga Superior de Baloncesto (Cuba) =

Cuba's top basketball league

Liga Superior de Baloncesto (LSB)
- Sport: Basketball
- Founded: 1993
- No. of teams: 8
- Country: Cuba
- Continent: North America
- Most recent champion: Capitalinos de La Habana (8th title) (2023)
- Website: www.latinbasket.com/Cuba/basketball.asp

The Liga Superior de Baloncesto (LSB) (English: Superior Basketball League) is the highest level men's professional basketball league in Cuba. The LSB has been active for twenty-eight years, interrupted only three times, once in 2011, 2014, and in 2020.

Ciego de Ávila is the most decorated team of the league with 10 championships.

== Current teams ==
- Artemisa
- Capitalinos de La Habana
- Ciego de Ávila
- Huracanes de Mayabeque
- Las Tunas
- Sancti Spiritus
- Santiago de Cuba
- Villa Clara

== Former Teams ==
- Cienfuegos
- Guantánamo CB
- Holguin
- Occidentales
- Orientales
- Pinar del Rio

== Post Season Structure ==
During the regular season, 60-160 games are played within the two months of league activity. The top four teams with the most wins are entered into the post season semifinals. The two respective winners from the semifinals advance to the finals, and whoever wins in the finals is crowned the champion. The semifinals and finals are played to best of five, with no draws allowed.

== Standings 2001-2023 ==
Season	Record							
2001	1. Centrales 19-3	2. Orientales 17-10	3. Capitalinos Azules de La Habana 13-14	4. Occidentales 5-22				
2002	1. Centrales 18-9	2. Capitalinos Azules de La Habana 14-13	3. Occidentales 13-14	4. Orientales 9-18				
2003	1. Centrales 26-10	2. Orientales 17-19	3. Occidentales 15-21	4. Capitalinos Azules de La Habana 14-22				
2004–05	1. Ciego de Ávila	2. Santiago de Cuba	3. Villa Clara	4. Guerreros de Matanzas				
2005–06	1. Ciego de Ávila 17-3	2. Santiago de Cuba 12-8	3. Villa Clara 10-10	4. Guerreros de Matanzas 8-12	5. Capitalinos Azules de La Habana 7-13	6. Guantanamo CB 6-14		
2006–07	1. Ciego de Ávila	2. Capitalinos Azules de La Habana	3. Guerreros de Matanzas	4. Tigres de Camaguey				
2007–08	1. Capitalinos Azules de La Habana 14-6	2. Ciego de Ávila 14-6	3. Guerreros de Matanzas 11-9	4. Tigres de Camaguey	5. Guantanamo CB 6-14	6. Santiago de Cuba 5-15		
2008–09	1. Capitalinos Azules de La Habana 24-4	2. Ciego de Ávila 20-6	3. Guerreros de Matanzas 19-9	4. Guantanamo CB 17-11	5. Tigres de Camaguey 15-11	6. Metropolitanos 7-21	7. Villa Clara 5-23	8. Santiago de Cuba 3-25
2009–10	1. Capitalinos Azules de La Habana 13-1	2. Tigres de Camaguey 10-4	3. Ciego de Ávila 10-4	4. Guerreros de Matanzas 7-7	5. Guantanamo CB 5-9	6. Metropolitanos 5-9	7. Villa Clara 4-10	8. Santiago de Cuba 2-12
2011 Season Suspended
2011–12	1. Ciego de Ávila 21-7	2. Capitalinos Azules de La Habana 22-8	3. Tigres de Camaguey 17-11	4. Guerreros de Matanzas 14-14	5. Villa Clara 13-15	6. Guantanamo CB 12-16	7. Pinar del Rio 9-18	8. Santiago de Cuba 5-22
2012–13	1. Capitalinos Azules de La Habana 15-5	2. Ciego de Ávila 15-7	3. Santiago de Cuba 14-8	4. Tigres de Camaguey 10-10	5. Artemisa 10-12	6. Guerreros de Matanzas 10-12	7. Guantanamo CB 8-12	8. Sancti Spiritus 2-18
2014 Season Suspended
2015	1. Capitalinos Azules de La Habana 27-0	2. Ciego de Ávila 19-9	3. Artemisa 18-10	4. Santiago de Cuba 18-10	5. Pinar del Rio 12-16	6. Tigres de Camaguey 9-19	7. Las Tunas 5-22	8. Guantanamo CB 3-25
2016	1. Capitalinos Azules de La Habana 19-9	2. Ciego de Ávila 18-10	3. Villa Clara 18-10	4. Guantanamo CB 14-14	5. Pinar del Rio 12-16	6. Santiago de Cuba 11-17	7. Tigres de Camaguey 11-17	8. Artemisa 9-19
2017	1. Villa Clara 18-3	2. Pinar del Rio 15-6	3. Capitalinos Azules de La Habana 14-6	4. Guerreros de Matanzas 13-7	5. Santiago de Cuba 8-12	6. Ciego de Ávila 7-13	7. Tigres de Camaguey 2-18	8. Guantanamo CB 0-20
2018	1. Villa Clara 13-8	2. Ciego de Ávila 12-9	3. Santiago de Cuba 12-9	4. Tigres de Camaguey 12-9	5. Capitalinos Azules de La Habana 11-10	6. Guerreros de Matanzas 10-11	7. Guantanamo CB 8-13	8. Pinar del Rio 6-15
2019	1. Villa Clara 15-11	2. Artemisa 15-11	3. Santiago de Cuba 14-12	4. Capitalinos Azules de La Habana 14-12	5. Sancti Spiritus 14-12	6. Guerreros de Matanzas 13-13	7. Tigres de Camaguey 9-16	8. Guantanamo CB 7-19
2020	Abandoned due to the COVID-19 pandemic in Cuba							
2022	1. Ciego de Ávila 19-3	2. Capitalinos Azules de La Habana 14-8	3. Sancti Spiritus 13-5	4. Santiago de Cuba 12–10	5. Villa Clara 9-13	6. Artemisa 7-13	7. Guantanamo CB 6-15	8. Guerreros de Matanzas 2-18
2023	1. Capitalinos de La Habana 23-5	2. Santiago de Cuba 23-5	3. Ciego de Ávila 15-13	4. Sancti Spiritus 13-15	5. Artemisa 12-16	6. Huracanes de Mayabeque 11-17	7. Villa Clara 11-17	8. Las Tunas 4-24

== Champions ==
Season	Champion
1993	Orientales
1994	Capitalinos Azules de La Habana
1995	Capitalinos Azules de La Habana
1996	Capitalinos Azules de La Habana
1997	Capitalinos Azules de La Habana
1998	Capitalinos Azules de La Habana
1999	Orientales
2000	Orientales
2001	Centrales
2002	Centrales
2003	Centrales
2004–05	Ciego de Ávila
2005–06	Ciego de Ávila
2006–07	Ciego de Ávila
2007–08	Ciego de Ávila
2008–09	Ciego de Ávila
2009–10	Capitalinos Azules de La Habana
2010–11	No champion
2011–12	Ciego de Ávila
2012–13	Ciego de Ávila
2013	Ciego de Ávila
2014	No champion
2015	Capitalinos Azules de La Habana
2016	Ciego de Ávila
2017	Pinar del Rio
2018	Villa Clara
2019	Villa Clara
2020	no champion
2022	Ciego de Ávila
2023	Capitalinos de La Habana
