= Juan Antonio Corbalán =

Spanish basketball player

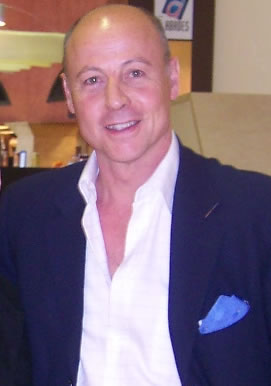
- Corbalán in 2009

Personal information
- Born: August 3, 1954 (age 72) Madrid, Spain
- Listed height: 6 ft 0.5 in (1.84 m)
- Listed weight: 185 lb (84 kg)

Career information
- Playing career: 1970–1991
- Position: Point guard
- Number: 11

Career history
- 1970–1988: Real Madrid
- 1990–1991: Valladolid

Career highlights
- 4× FIBA Intercontinental Cup champion (1976–1978, 1981); 13× FIBA International Christmas Tournament champion (1970, 1972, 1973, 1974, 1975, 1976, 1977, 1978, 1980, 1981, 1985, 1986, 1987); FIBA's 50 Greatest Players (1991); FIBA EuroBasket MVP (1983); FIBA European Player of the Year (1983); 2× European Club Super Cup champion (1984, 1988); 3× EuroLeague champion (1974, 1978, 1980); 7× FIBA European Selection Team (1976, 1977, 1979, 1980, 1981 2×, 1982); 50 Greatest EuroLeague Contributors (2008); 101 Greats of European Basketball (2018); FIBA European Cup Winners' Champion champion (1984); FIBA Korać Cup champion (1988); 12× Spanish League champion (1972–1977, 1979, 1980, 1982 LEB, 1984–1986 ACB); 7× Spanish Cup winner (1972–1975, 1977, 1985, 1986); Spanish Supercup winner (1984); Spanish Sportsman of the Year (1983); Spanish Royal Order of Sports Merit (1994); Spanish Basketball Hall of Fame (2019)
Medals
Men's basketball
Representing Spain
Summer Olympic Games
Silver medal – second place	1984 Los Angeles
FIBA EuroBasket
Silver medal – second place	1983 France

Juan Antonio Corbalán Alfocea (born August 3, 1954) is a Spanish retired professional basketball player. At 6 ft. 1/2 in. (1.84 m) tall, Corbalán was one of the best European point guards of the 1970s and 1980s. During his playing career, he was nicknamed "Von Karajan", like the Italian player Aldo Ossola before him, due to being a point guard with a great ability to direct the offensive rhythm and game tempo for his teams. At the club level, Corbalan won four FIBA Intercontinental Cup championships, and three EuroLeague championships. He was named by FIBA Europe, to the FIBA European Selection Team, a record total of seven times. Corbalan was named the Spanish Sportsman of the Year in 1983.

At the national team level, Corbalan represented his native country in three Summer Olympic Games. He competed with Spain's senior national team at the 1972 Munich Summer Games, the 1980 Moscow Summer Games, and the 1984 Los Angeles Summer Games. He was also voted the EuroBasket MVP of the 1983 FIBA EuroBasket.

Corbalan was named one of FIBA's 50 Greatest Players in 1991. He was given the Spanish Royal Order of Sports Merit award in 1994. In 2008, he was named one of the 50 Greatest EuroLeague Contributors. He was named one of the 101 Greats of European Basketball in 2018. He was inducted into the Spanish Basketball Hall of Fame in 2019.

Corbalán is also a doctor, specializing in cardiology.

== Club career ==
=== Real Madrid ===
Corbalán spent most of his club career playing in Spain's top-tier level competition. He played with Real Madrid, from the 1971–72 season, until the 1987–88 season. With Real Madrid, he won four FIBA Intercontinental Cup championships, in the years 1976, 1977, 1978, and 1981, thirteen FIBA International Christmas Tournament championships (1970, 1972, 1973, 1974, 1975, 1976, 1977, 1978, 1980, 1981, 1985, 1986, and 1987), and two European Club Super Cup championships, in the years 1984 and 1988.

As a member of Real Madrid, he also won three FIBA European Champions Cups (now known as the EuroLeague) championships, in the years 1974, 1978, and 1980, one FIBA European Cup Winners' Cup championship, in the year 1984, and one FIBA Korać Cup championship, in the year 1988.

In addition to that, Corbalan won twelve Spanish League championships while with Real Madrid, as he won nine of them in the LEB Primera División (1972, 1973, 1974, 1975, 1976, 1977, 1979, 1980, and 1982), and three of them in the Liga ACB, in 1984, 1985, and 1986. He also won seven Spanish Cup titles (1972, 1973, 1974, 1975, 1977, 1985, and 1986), and one Spanish Supercup title, in the year 1984, with Real Madrid.

Corbalan was chosen for the FIBA European Selection Team a total of seven times (1976, 1977, 1979, 1980, 1981 2×, 1982).

=== Valladolid ===
Corbalan ended his professional club playing career with the Spanish ACB League club Valladolid. He played with the club during the ACB 1990–91 season.

== National team career ==
=== Spanish junior national team ===
Corbalan was a member of the Spanish junior national teams. He played at the 1971 FIBA European Championship for Cadets, where Spain finished in 4th place. He also played at the 1972 FIBA European Championship for Juniors, where Spain finished in 7th place.

=== Spanish senior national team ===
Corbalán was also a member of the senior Spanish national team. He was named the Most Valuable Player of the 1983 FIBA EuroBasket, after leading Spain to that tournament's final against Italy, by a score of 105–96. Spain ended up losing to Italy in the final. Corbalan also won the silver medal with the senior Spanish national team at the 1984 Los Angeles Summer Olympic Games.

Corbalán also represented Spain at the following major FIBA tournaments: the 1972 FIBA European Olympic Qualifying Tournament, the 1972 FIBA Pre-Olympic Basketball Tournament, the 1972 Munich Summer Olympics, the 1974 FIBA World Championship, the 1975 FIBA EuroBasket, the 1976 FIBA Pre-Olympic Basketball Tournament, the 1977 FIBA EuroBasket, the 1979 FIBA EuroBasket, the 1980 FIBA European Olympic Qualifying Tournament, the 1980 Moscow Summer Olymppics, the 1981 FIBA EuroBasket, and the 1982 FIBA World Championship.

== Medical career ==
During his basketball activity years, Corbalán studied medicine at the Complutense University of Madrid and became a cardiologist. He worked as a doctor for Real Madrid F.C. and the Spain men's national basketball team.
