= History of Real Madrid Baloncesto =

History of Spanish professional basketball club Real Madrid Baloncesto

This is the history of Real Madrid Baloncesto, a professional Spanish basketball club founded in 1931 as a division of Real Madrid CF.

== History ==
=== Foundation and early decades (1931–1952) ===
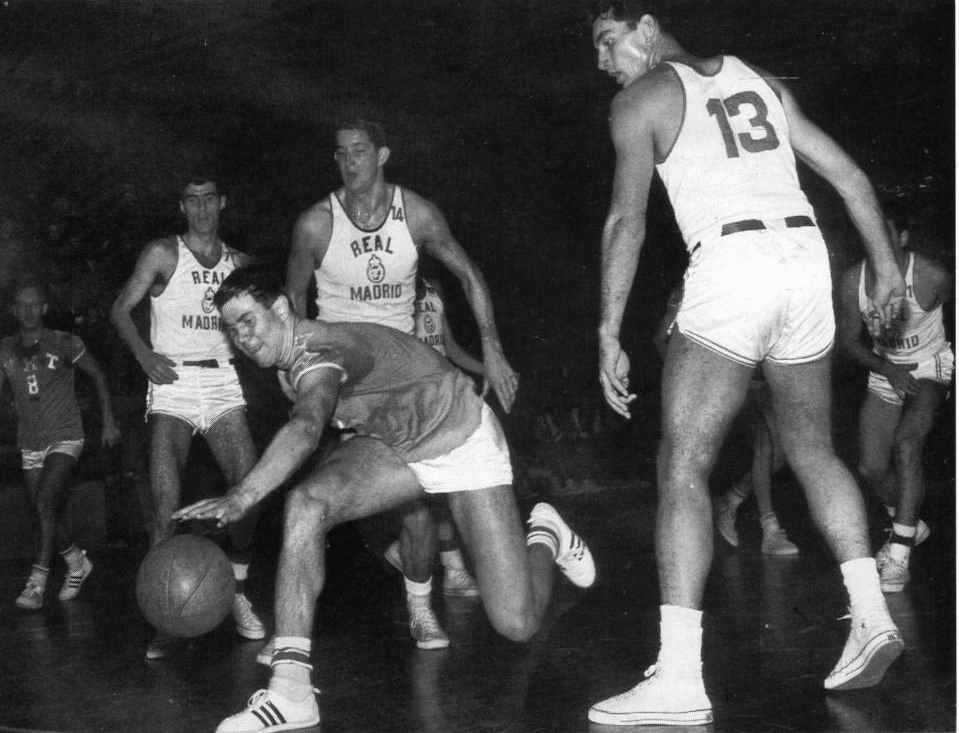
The Real Madrid basketball department was founded in 1931.

Ángel Cabrera, a pioneer and one of the key figures in promoting basketball in Spain, established the first basketball team in Castile in 1922. This was followed on March 8, 1931, by the creation of the Real Madrid basketball department after placing an advertisement in the ABC newspaper to recruit volunteer players. The initial roster included Eric Hermes, Luis Hoyos, Emilio Gutiérrez Bringas, Juan Castellví, Jenaro Olives, Máximo Arnáiz, Juan Negrín, Delgado, Llano, Midel, and the German Midelman, who, along with Cabrera, formed the first squad, officially named Real Madrid Basket-Ball on March 22 of the same year. The team held its first training sessions at the Standard Club's court. The recruitment announcement stated:

"Real Madrid requests that all gentlemen interested in practicing this sport (basketball) visit the Club's Secretariat at Caballero de Gracia, 15, to receive instructions regarding the selection match and training session to be played next Sunday at ten in the morning against the Instituto-Escuela."

— Ángel Cabrera, March 8, 1931, Madrid

With football already well-established, the then-president Luis Usera sought to promote other sports to enhance the club's prestige. Thus, a new discipline was born within the club, among many other departments, which over time gained popularity and became one of the club's most prominent representations beyond Spain's borders.

In its founding year, the club won its first title, the Copa Chapultepec, a tournament organized in Cercedilla by the Mexican magnate and former club member Emilio Gutiérrez Bringas, who maintained a close friendship with the then-young general secretary of the club, Santiago Bernabéu. That same year, the club competed in its first national competition, the inaugural Regional Championship, finishing third behind the Rayo Club, with whom they vied for Castilian supremacy until the outbreak of the Spanish Civil War.

After the first training and selection session on March 15 against the Instituto-Escuela—the origin of the Instituto Ramiro de Maeztu, the youth academy of the current Club Baloncesto Estudiantes—to determine the initial team, the first official match in the club's history took place on March 22, 1931. The game, played on the same day as the department's official founding, was against the Dumping Basket-Ball Club in the aforementioned Castile Regional Championship. The match ended in a 19–5 defeat for Real Madrid, with Ángel Cabrera as the club's top scorer with four points, scoring one field goal and two free throws. The other four players were Emilio Gutiérrez, Midelman, Luis Hoyos—who scored another free throw—and Midel. The club's first victory came in the second round on April 2, defeating the Ministry of the Navy 9–5 at the Standard Club's court, as the club did not yet have its own facility, which was inaugurated just a month later. The scorers were Llano with four baskets and Máximo Arnáiz with one free throw, joined by Ángel Cabrera, Luis Hoyos, Delgado, Iranzo, and Maller.

On April 3, 1932, the first match between Catalans and Madrilenians was played to gauge the level of Madrid's basketball compared to the more established Catalan game. Held in Barcelona, at La Bordeta court, Real Madrid Basket-Ball defeated RCD Espanyol 24–19, a team that included Anselmo López, who later became the coach of the Madrid team. The 1930s also brought the first official title, the aforementioned 1933 Regional Championship, and the creation of the Women's Department, which won the Regional Championship in its founding year, 1934, and again in 1943, finishing as runners-up in the Copa de la Reina de Baloncesto before the department was disbanded in 1944 and its players joined the Sección Femenina of the Falange Española.

From then on, the club dominated a tournament whose standings qualified teams for the Copa del Rey de Baloncesto. In its first appearance in the inaugural edition, Real Madrid was defeated 21–17 by the Iluro Basket-Ball Club in Mataró. After a comeback in the return leg in Madrid, they finished as runners-up, losing the final 21–11 to a Rayo Club composed of several former Real Madrid players. This was the first of four runner-up finishes before the club finally won the Spanish Championship.

Thanks to one of the key factors that strengthened the club's foundations in its early social championships, the recruitment of international players, Real Madrid became not only the regional but also the national dominant force over the years. The attraction of Latin American talent to the Complutense University of Madrid allowed the club to sign promising players from the New World, significantly elevating the quality of Spanish basketball, which was still rudimentary at the time.

From Spain's former colonies of Cuba, Puerto Rico, and the Philippines, the club welcomed exceptional players such as Freddy Borrás, Rafael Deliz, Willo Galíndez, Toñín Casillas, and Johnny Báez, who were well-versed in American professional basketball and brought unprecedented height to Spain, greatly strengthening the club. They led Real Madrid to its first three Spanish Championship titles in 1951 against FC Barcelona, the dominant team of the previous decade led by Eduardo Kucharsky, and in 1952 and 1954 against Joventut Badalona.

Another pivotal moment for the department, perhaps the most significant, occurred in 1952, coinciding with the club's Golden Jubilee. Santiago Bernabéu, now leading the club, sought assistance from the Spanish Basketball Federation to organize a basketball tournament, a sport in which he had limited expertise. This led to the arrival of one of the club's most iconic figures: Raimundo Saporta.

=== Raimundo Saporta and the first golden era (1952–75) ===
The young executive from the Federation quickly became Santiago Bernabéu's right-hand man, thanks to his impeccable organization of the event. The tournament, attended by Paris Basket Racing, the Puerto Rican national team, and a team of American soldiers stationed at the English airbase in Lakenheath called the Lakenheath Pirates, was a success, prompting Bernabéu to recruit Saporta to the club despite his lack of football knowledge, unlike the club's president. This partnership propelled the club to the pinnacle of Europe in both football and basketball, establishing Raimundo Saporta as one of the most prominent figures in Spanish and European basketball.

In the 1952–53 season, the club won the Latin Cup, a recently created competition that served as a precursor to the European Cup and the modern EuroLeague. This was the club's first international title.

Under Saporta's leadership, the basketball department continued to grow, and he was instrumental in creating various competitions that elevated the sport, such as the league tournament. The first edition of the National Basketball League began in the 1956–57 season, with Real Madrid playing at their new venue, the Fiesta Alegre fronton, the stage for many great achievements and comebacks. In this competition, the club won its first league title and had the honor of being the first leader in the standings after defeating their city rivals and main competitors, Club Baloncesto Estudiantes, 76–61 in the opening round. The players in that first match, coached by Ignacio Pinedo, were Joaquín Hernández, José Alberto Herreras, José Luis Alcántara, Arturo Imedio, Luis Trujillano, William Brindle, Jorge Bonet, and the center Alfonso Martínez, with the latter being the team's top scorer with 17 points and the league's leading scorer with 180 points.

The teams in that inaugural league edition included the aforementioned Real Madrid and Estudiantes, along with Joventut Badalona, FC Barcelona Bàsquet, CB Aismalíbar, and CB Sabadell. Seven victories in ten games secured Real Madrid's first league trophy, which also qualified them for their debut in official international competition, the inaugural European Cup, a competition co-created by Raimundo Saporta modeled after the European Football Cup, which had been established three years earlier. Both competitions were initiated and promoted by the club.

Their first official international match was in the aforementioned European Cup against the Portuguese Barreirense Basket, winning 51–68 in the round of 16. The team's top scorers were Alfonso Martínez and “Johnny” Báez, both with 16 points. After advancing with a 154–91 aggregate score, they faced Royal Brussels in the quarterfinals, winning 121–116 over two legs to reach the semifinals. However, their first participation in Europe's premier club competition ended there. Real Madrid was set to face Armijas Sporta Klubs Rīga from the Soviet Union, but political tensions between the Soviet Union and Spain's regime at the time led Francisco Franco to prohibit Spanish teams from traveling to Soviet territory. In response, Raimundo Saporta proposed playing the tie in a single match in Paris, but this was not accepted by FIBA, resulting in the Spanish team's elimination without playing the semifinal against the eventual champions of the first three editions of the tournament.

In 1957, the Castile Championship (1931–1957) was discontinued for teams competing in the National League, with Real Madrid having won 11 titles, making them the most decorated team. The Marca Trophy (Regional Basketball Tournament), which brought together the best regional teams from Madrid and served as the season opener, succeeding the Castile Championship, emerged during this period and ran from 1957 to 1967. Sponsored by the newspaper Marca, Real Madrid was the most successful team with eight titles.

During the 1950s, the club won one Latin Cup, three leagues, six cups, four Castile Cups, and two Regional Tournaments (Marca Trophy).

==== The arrival of Pedro Ferrándiz ====
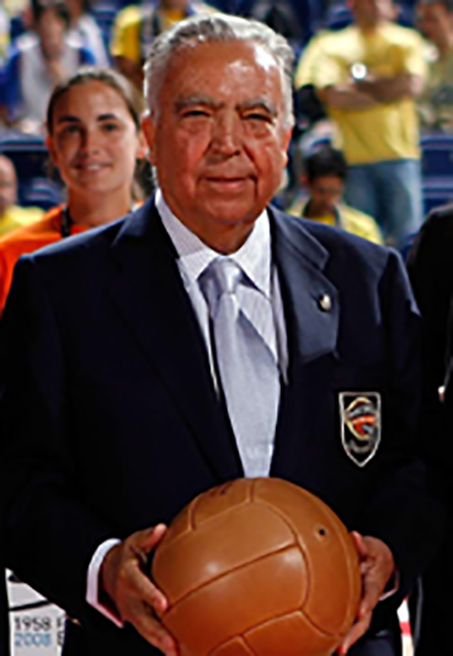
Pedro Ferrándiz, the club's most decorated coach.

The club struggled to translate its national success to the international stage, often being eliminated before reaching the final of Europe's top tournament in its early editions. As a result, Saporta decided to bring in Pedro Ferrándiz, who would become one of the most iconic figures in global basketball. Under the direction of the Alicante-born coach, the club experienced its greatest years, even pitting its first team against its reserve team, Club Hesperia de Madrid, in a Spanish Cup final—a feat later replicated by the football department, a unique occurrence in the history of both competitions.

Coached by Ferrándiz, the team won fifteen Leagues, fourteen Cups, and four European Cups, a record that remains unmatched to this day. Ferrándiz was the first to introduce innovations from the NBA and pioneered the exchange of concepts with American coaches. During one of his trips to North America, he signed a young college basketball prospect before he joined the Harlem Globetrotters, a 2.03 m center named Wayne Hightower, who joined players such as Emiliano Rodríguez, Carlos Sevillano, and Lolo Sainz. Thanks to them, the club reached the final of the coveted European Cup, aiming to take over the international spotlight from the football department, which was seeing the end of the golden era of “Di Stéfano’s Madrid.”

After defeating Club Sportif Casablancais 166–84 on aggregate in the first round of the 1961–62 edition, Real Madrid faced Pallacanestro Varese, where a curious incident occurred. With seconds remaining and the score tied at 80 in the first leg in Varese, Ferrándiz called a timeout despite having suspended and injured players. To minimize risks and avoid a larger defeat, he instructed his players to score in their own basket, resulting in a final score of 82–80. Following this, FIBA changed the rules for knockout ties, allowing draws to avoid overtime and controversial decisions. The return leg in Madrid qualified the Spaniards.

CWKS Legia and AŠK Olimpija were the opponents before facing BC Dinamo of Tbilisi in the final. Due to the same political issues as in the first edition, the tournament was decided in a single match for the first time in its history, played in Geneva, Switzerland. The standout performance of the new signing Wayne Hightower, who scored 30 points and was the game’s top scorer, was not enough for a Madrid victory, losing the final 90–83. Nevertheless, the club reached the pinnacle of international basketball, a position it would solidify throughout the decade.

In the 1962–63 season, the team reached its second final, requiring a third tiebreaker game after a 160–160 aggregate against CSKA Moscow. The tiebreaker was lost 99–80.

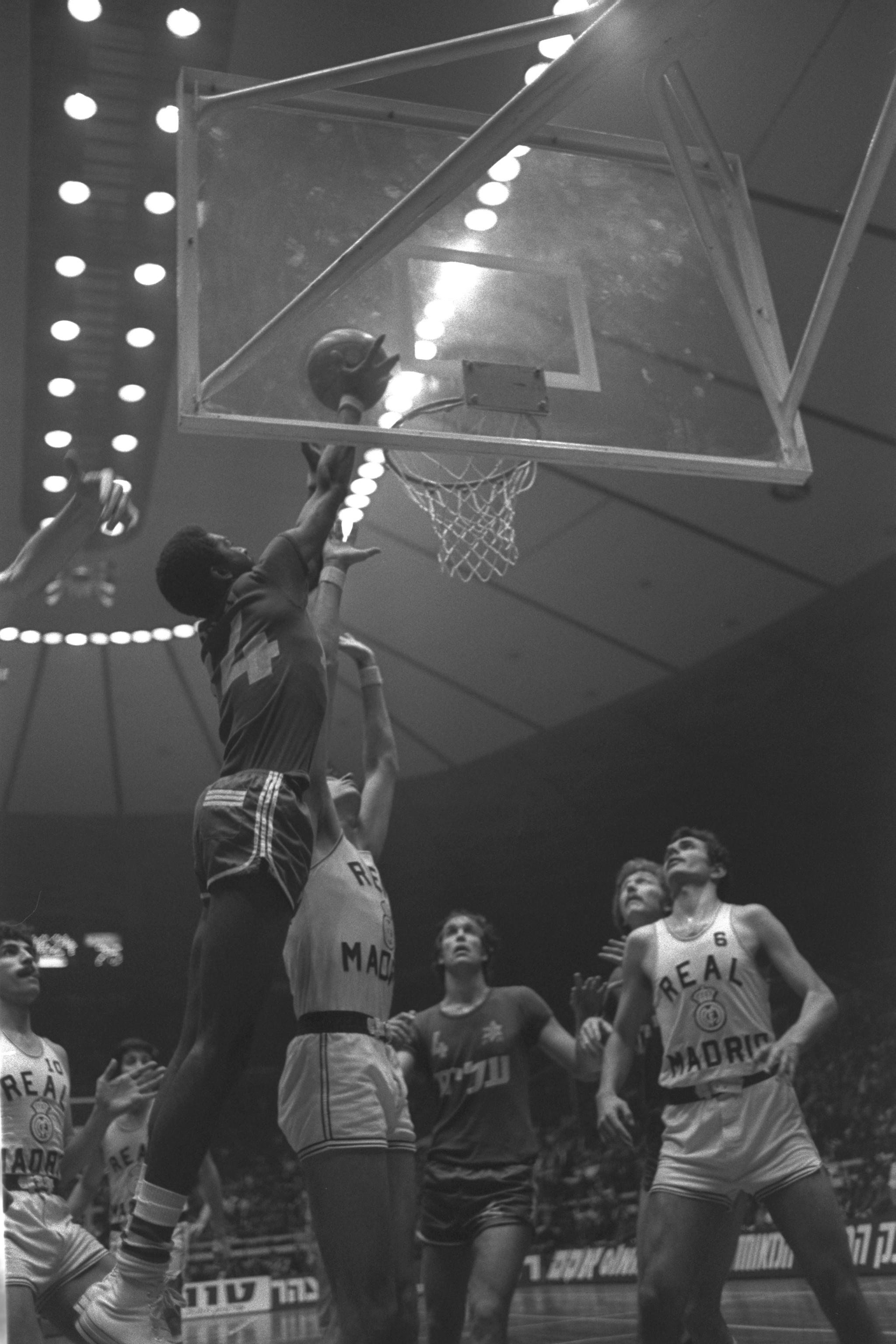
European matchup against Maccabi Tel Aviv in 1975.

Just two years after reaching its first European final, Real Madrid became the first team to dethrone Soviet teams from the top of European basketball. Another American, brought in by Ferrándiz, left his mark in the club’s history: Clifford Luyk. Luyk shone in a triumphant team alongside players such as the Ramos brothers (Vicente and José Ramón), from C.B. Estudiantes, Lolo Sáinz, and Emiliano Rodríguez, the great idol of the 1960s who won 24 major titles in his career.

Real Madrid achieved an unstoppable run to the 1964 European Cup final, defeating Celtic Belfast B.C. (209–119), TSV Alemannia Aachen (208–112), CWKS Legia (194–176), and Simmenthal Olimpia Milano (178–160) before facing Spartak ZJŠ Brno. In the two-leg tie, the Czechoslovak team won the first leg 110–99 despite strong performances from Emiliano, Luyk, and Burgess, leaving an 11-point deficit to overcome in Madrid. In the return leg, the halftime score was 37–33 in favor of Real Madrid, but insufficient for the title. A strong second half resulted in an 84–64 victory, securing the club’s first European Cup, achieved under Joaquín Hernández’s coaching during a brief two-year period when Pedro Ferrándiz took over as sporting director, replacing Saporta, who was occupied with other club duties.

The successful trajectory, driven by figures such as Saporta, Ferrándiz, Emiliano, Sáinz, and Luyk, continued with players such as Wayne Brabender and Juan Antonio Corbalán. When it seemed the club’s great cycle of victories was ending with the departures of Sáinz and Emiliano, they led the club to four more European Cups in six finals while dominating Spain with ten consecutive leagues and six cups. Meanwhile, Lolo Sainz took charge of the youth categories, planting the seeds for the club’s second golden era.

In 1968 and 1970, the club reached the Intercontinental Cup final.

During the 1960s, Real Madrid won 4 European Cups (the premier European club competition), 9 leagues, 6 cups, 4 International Christmas Tournaments (FIBA), and 6 Regional Tournaments (Marca Trophy), along with their first Triple Crown in 1965.

==== International Christmas Tournament ====
The growing prestige of the team led to the creation of a tournament that brought together the best international teams, coinciding with the opening of the indoor arena at the Ciudad Deportiva. The competition began in January 1966 as the FIBA Intercontinental Cup and was later renamed the FIBA International Christmas Tournament.

The Christmas Tournament, also known as the International Christmas Tournament, was a defunct international friendly men’s basketball competition at the club level, organized by FIBA in its early decades through the Commission of International Organizations under the leadership of Raimundo Saporta, a club executive and president of FIBA’s International Commission, and with the authorization and support of William Jones, its secretary general. It held official FIBA status in its early decades (and later continued under FIBA’s auspices), serving as the starting point for the FIBA Intercontinental Cup, whose first edition is included in this tournament’s record.

With FIBA’s authorization and support, Real Madrid C.F. was tasked with its annual organization, bringing together teams from most continents. Ignis Varese from Italy, Sport Club Corinthians Paulista from Brazil, and the Chicago Jamaco Saints faced Real Madrid in the first edition. Its success led to a second edition during the same year’s Christmas under the name Latin Cup, (Note: Named after the origin of the participating teams, not to be confused with the earlier Latin Cup.) a clear attempt to establish a global competition, as it laid the foundation for the Intercontinental Cup, with the first edition of this Christmas tournament counted in its record.

Over its four decades, prestigious teams such as the North Carolina Tar Heels, the team of Michael Jordan, Maccabi Tel Aviv Basketball Club, Košarkaški Klub Split, Benetton Treviso, Košarkaški klub Cibona, C.S.K.A. Moskva, Joventut Badalona, and the national teams of the former Soviet Union and Yugoslavia participated, with Real Madrid winning the title 26 times.

In the 1973–74 season, Real Madrid won another European Cup against a Varese team they faced in three other finals, with the Lombard team playing in every European Cup final between 1969 and 1979.

The club holds the record for the most consecutive wins (87) from November 6, 1971, to February 2, 1975.

=== Second golden era (1975–89) ===
Before the retirement of Ferrándiz and Saporta from the department, they achieved five consecutive league and cup doubles, an 88-game unbeaten streak in the league, and chose Lolo Sainz, a key figure from the first golden era and well-versed in the club’s philosophy, as Ferrándiz’s successor. The choice quickly proved successful, and although he did not match his predecessor’s achievements, Sáinz amassed an impressive array of national and European titles over the two decades he coached the first team.

Over the years, another player took his place on the court: Juan Antonio Corbalán. He captained the team during its second golden era alongside Wayne Brabender, Rafael Rullán, Carmelo Cabrera, Cristóbal, Prada, Juanma Iturriaga, and Fernando Romay, who passed the baton to another great generation of players, including Chechu Biriukov, Llorente, and Fernando Martín, the first Spanish player to compete in the NBA with the Portland Trail Blazers.

Sáinz’s tenure extended the streak to ten consecutive leagues, still the best record by any Spanish team, while their cup dominance was interrupted by F.C. Barcelona, which began its own first golden era, resulting in some of the most competitive battles in basketball history, alongside those against Ignis Varese. Against the Italians, they vied for European supremacy, facing off in four European Cup finals with two wins each. In the last of these, both teams had five titles, with Real Madrid prevailing in the 1978 victory in Munich by 75–68, thanks to a stellar performance by Walter Szczerbiak, a flagship player whom Saporta persuaded to sign when the German-American was on his way to the NBA.

In 1977, Real Madrid inflicted a severe defeat on F.C. Barcelona in the league, winning by 60 points (138–78) at the Sports City pavilion, with standout performances from Brabender (37 points), Rullán (29 points), Walter (20 points), Cristóbal (17 points), and Cabrera (5 points).

For three consecutive years, 1976, 1977, and 1978, Real Madrid won the FIBA Intercontinental Cup (remaining the most decorated team in this competition to date).

Additionally, it is the club with the largest margin of victory, at 92 points, after defeating Breogán 140–48 in 1976. It also holds the record for the highest individual scoring in a league game (Walter Szczerbiak, 65 points) on February 8, 1976, against Breogán.

The 1970s concluded with 3 Intercontinental Cups, 3 European Cups (the premier European club competition), 9 leagues, 6 cups, and 8 International Christmas Tournaments (FIBA), not counting friendly tournaments. The club also won its second Triple Crown in the 1973–74 season.

==== The boom of the eighties and the department’s Golden Jubilee ====
The significant growth of basketball was particularly evident in Spain during the 1980s, marked by intense rivalries in various national competitions and the emergence of new teams.

Competitions adapted to this growth, introducing the three-point line at 6.25 meters from the basket and restructuring the national league system, leading to the creation of the professional Liga ACB under the Asociación de Clubs de Baloncesto, with 16 teams attracting top players through early professional contracts. Real Madrid continued its dominance, having won 22 of the 27 editions of the National League (1957–1983), and claimed the first three ACB titles (1984–1986). These were the years of the rise of Fernando Martín, Fernando Romay, and Juanma López Iturriaga.

The club set a record for the highest scoring in a league game (149 points) against Salle de Barcelona in the 1981–82 season.

That first ACB edition was memorable for the inaugural playoff final between Real Madrid and Barcelona. Leading 1–0, Real Madrid faced a tight second game. A scuffle in the final minutes between Mike Davis and Juanma Iturriaga led to sanctions that caused discontent among the Catalans, who, despite tying the series in overtime, refused to play the decisive third game, handing the title to Real Madrid.

In 1981, the club celebrated the Golden Jubilee of the basketball department, the same year it won the Club World Championship in São Paulo, becoming the club with the most world titles at the club level, a record it still holds.

In the 1984–85 season, the ACB Spanish Supercup was introduced, initially promoted by the FEB, for only four editions before being revived in 2004. Real Madrid won the inaugural edition against CAI Zaragoza (101–61), finishing as runners-up in the next two editions against Joventut Badalona.

The presence of strong rivals in the 1980s added luster to the department’s history. One name stood out above the rest: Dražen Petrović. The young Croatian dominated the continent with his talent and strong personality. In 1985, he won the European Cup with Cibona Zagreb against Real Madrid. In 1986, Petrović scored 90 points across two games against Real Madrid. The club retaliated in 1988 by winning the Korać Cup against them. With this success, Lolo Sainz became the first coach to win all three continental titles (European Cup, Cup Winners’ Cup, and Korać Cup). The following season, the Croatian star donned the white jersey.

In the 1987–88 season, the team reached the final of the Prince of Asturias Basketball Cup for the first time (losing to F.C. Barcelona), a competition that only had four editions and was later contested by LEB teams.

The 1988–89 season began with high hopes, finishing as runners-up in the McDonald's Championship (World Cup), where Real Madrid challenged the Boston Celtics. Months later, they won the King’s Cup against Barça. A highlight of the season was March 14, 1989, when they won the European Cup Winners’ Cup in one of the most memorable finals in European basketball history. Dražen Petrović scored 62 points, leading Real Madrid to a 117–113 victory over Snaidero Caserta, featuring Oscar Schmidt.

After fifteen years as head coach, Lolo Sainz moved to the technical secretary role at the start of the 1989–90 season. He was replaced by NBA coach George Karl. Meanwhile, Dražen Petrović headed to the NBA, leaving Fernando Martín as the team’s cornerstone. On December 3, 1989, the Madrid-born center died in a car accident on his way to a game at the Sports Palace.

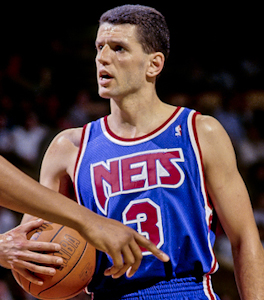
Dražen Petrović, one of the greatest basketball players in the club’s history.

In the 1980s, the Torneo Comunidad de Madrid ("CAM Tournament") was established, organized by the Madrid Basketball Federation and the ACB, succeeding the Regional Tournament (Marca Trophy). Real Madrid won the first four editions consecutively.

Additionally, during the 1980s, the ACEB (ACB) organized an international competition, the ACB International Clubs Tournament, "Héctor Quiroga Memorial" (1983–1991), featuring notable matchups against Pallacanestro Virtus Roma, F.C. Barcelona, Olimpia Milano, KK Cibona, and KK Split. Real Madrid won three editions, making them the most decorated team in this competition, which gradually faded until its discontinuation. The FIBA European Super Cup of 1989, which Real Madrid qualified for as Cup Winners’ Cup champions, was not held due to the absence of Jugoplástika (KK Split), resulting in the tournament’s cancellation, though Real Madrid was declared the winner.

The 1980s concluded with 1 Club World Championship, 2 European Cup Winners’ Cups, 1 Korać Cup, 3 ACB International Tournaments, 4 leagues, 3 King’s Cups, 1 Spanish Supercup, 5 International Christmas Tournaments, and 4 CAM Tournaments (not counting the suspended European Super Cup final due to the opponent’s refusal to play), as the most notable titles.

=== The nineties: The eighth European Cup and the pursuit of new successes (1990–2000) ===
The 1989–90 season was one of the most challenging for the department and the entire club, beginning the 1990s with the car accident on December 3, 1989, that claimed the life of Fernando Martín, a symbol of Madridismo and basketball, as he was driving to the Sports Palace. Three days later, Real Madrid played a European competition match against PAOK, winning by twenty points. His sudden passing had a profound impact on Spanish society. Thousands of people visited the chapel that was set up at the Sports City pavilion. Real Madrid retired his number 10 jersey, the only number never worn again, making him an enduring emotional reference for Madridismo and Spanish basketball. The traditional International Christmas Tournament was dedicated to honoring him (Fernando Martín Memorial).

The following season, the team reached the Korać Cup final despite the departure of legends such as Lolo Sainz and Paco Amescua. Tragedy struck again with the death of Ignacio Pinedo, a club icon who had replaced Wayne Brabender as coach, suffering a heart attack just 16 minutes into the first leg of the final. The players were so affected that they could not recover in overtime during the second match. However, the next season, they dedicated a victory to him by winning the European Cup Winners’ Cup final in Nantes, thanks to a basket by Rickey Brown assisted by Fasoulas, with Clifford Luyk on the bench (replacing George Karl in January). Luyk coached in two stints (1991–94 and 1998–99), winning 2 leagues (reaching 3 finals), 1 cup, and 1 Cup Winners’ Cup in his first stint.

In 1992, the club signed the Lithuanian Arvydas Sabonis, a key piece in the project devised by department director Mariano Jaquotot to return to Europe’s summit, completed with the signing of Joe Arlauckas. The 1992–93 season saw a historic league and cup double and a EuroLeague semifinal appearance against Limoges, the eventual champions.

Before heading to the NBA, Arvydas Sabonis played a key role in winning the eighth European Cup.

In the McDonald's Championship, they secured third place. The 1993–94 league title was not enough, and Jaquotot hired Želimir Obradović in 1994, a coach who had won two EuroLeagues in three seasons, along with Lithuanian Rimas Kurtinaitis. On June 7, 1993, another tragedy struck with the death of Dražen Petrović in a car accident, followed by Jaquotot’s passing in August 1994 due to illness.

In the 1994–95 season, the team, featuring Arvydas Sabonis, Joe Arlauckas, José Lasa, Ismael Santos, Javier García Coll, Pep Cargol, Antonio Martín, José Miguel Antúnez, and José Biriukov, coached by Želimir Obradović, failed to win national titles and fell in the league semifinals to FC Barcelona by 29 points. However, they reached the EuroLeague Final Four in Zaragoza, defeating Olympiacos B.C. 73–61 in the final to claim the 8th European Cup (the premier European club competition), their first in fifteen years, adding to their historic European and international record (13th European title and 17th FIBA-recognized international title, the most decorated). That November, Lorenzo Sanz succeeded Ramón Mendoza as club president. In the McDonald's Championship, they finished fourth.

After this historic success, the following season’s EuroLeague Final Four ended in fourth place, with no national titles won. Notably, Joe Arlauckas delivered a memorable performance, scoring 63 points in a EuroLeague group stage game against Virtus Bologna.

Due to severe financial difficulties and a restructuring, coupled with the departures of stars such as Sabonis (to the NBA), Lasa, and Cargol, and the retirements of Biriukov and Antonio Martín, a new project was needed. However, president Lorenzo Sanz’s ambition to sign the best, along with Pedro Ferrándiz’s return to the front office, led to the arrivals of the top Spanish small forward Alberto Herreros and European star Dejan Bodiroga. With experienced players such as Pablo Laso, Alberto Angulo, and Juan Antonio Orenga, the 1996–97 season saw Real Madrid reach the European Cup Winners’ Cup final, defeating Mash Verona to win their 4th European Cup Winners’ Cup (tied with Cantù as the most decorated in this now-defunct competition). This marked their 14th European title and 18th FIBA-recognized international title, the most decorated. This was the first title won after the February 1997 death of Raimundo Saporta, the department’s iconic director and club’s honorary president, who was honored at the December 1996 Christmas Tournament. At the end of the season, the team finished as the league runner-up in 1996–97. The board then sacked Obradović for failing to win a national title during his three seasons.

In 1998, due to significant financial losses and a lack of titles, there was speculation about disbanding the department, which ultimately did not happen. A major team restructuring followed, with coaches Miguel Ángel Martín and Tirso Lorente (1997–98) and Clifford Luyk in the 1998–99 season (coinciding with his son Sergio playing that season), signing Tanoka Beard to revitalize the team.

With Sergio Scariolo’s arrival in 1999 (staying for three seasons) and the Angulo brothers (Lucio Angulo and Alberto Angulo) on the court, Real Madrid won its 28th league title in the 1999–2000 season, the last of the 20th century, defeating eternal rivals FC Barcelona in the fifth game at the Palau Blaugrana. Despite an injured Alberto Herreros (the era’s top player), Alberto Angulo and Aleksandar Đorđević, a former Barcelona player, shone, with Đorđević emerging as the hero of the final. Contributions from Belgian Éric Struelens (1998–2002) were also notable. The department was led by Lorenzo Sanz “Junior.”

The 1990s concluded with 1 European Cup (EuroLeague), 2 European Cup Winners’ Cups, 3 leagues, 1 cup, 5 CAM Tournaments, and 6 Christmas Tournaments as the most prominent competitions.

=== The department and the early 21st century: Herreros’ league and the ULEB Cup (2001–2010) ===
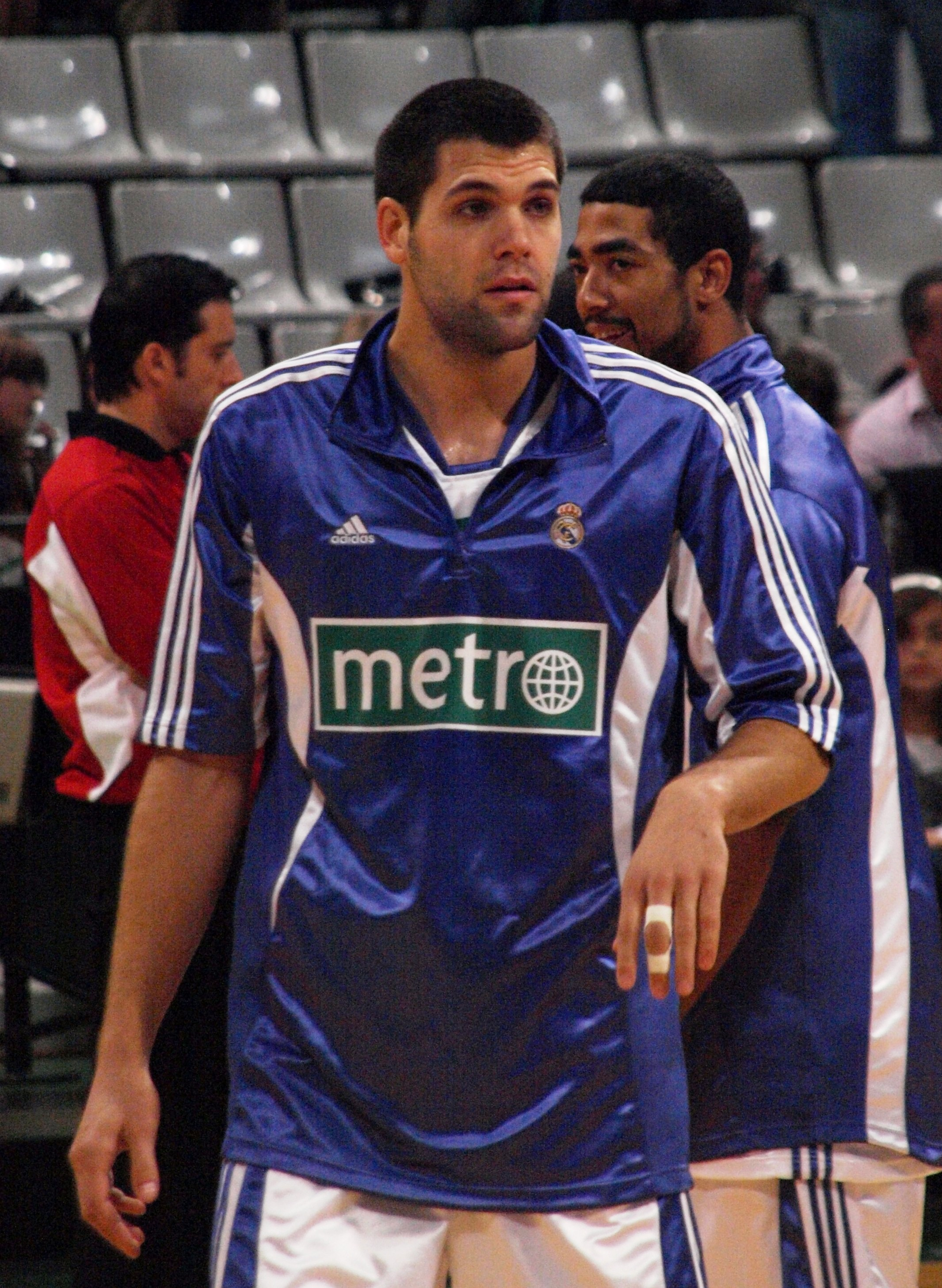
Felipe Reyes, one of the idols of the white team's fans.

The 21st century began with Florentino Pérez as president (his first term), Jorge Valdano as sporting director (for both football and basketball), the signing of Raúl López, the sale of the old Ciudad Deportiva’s land, including the demolition of the historic Raimundo Saporta Pavilion in 2004, the creation of a new Ciudad Real Madrid (opened in 2005), and plans for a new top-tier pavilion. The team temporarily played at the Palacio Vistalegre until 2010, then at the Caja Mágica for one year (2010–11).

In the first game of the new EuroLeague (the premier European club competition), in the 2000–01 season, Real Madrid received a deserved tribute from EuroLeague-ULEB. The inaugural match was Real Madrid vs. Olympiacos at the old Sports City pavilion, renamed Raimundo Saporta in 1999, as recognition of Europe’s most decorated team. The European Cup Winners’ Cup (renamed the Saporta Cup in honor of the iconic director) and Korać Cup were discontinued, replaced by the new ULEB Cup.

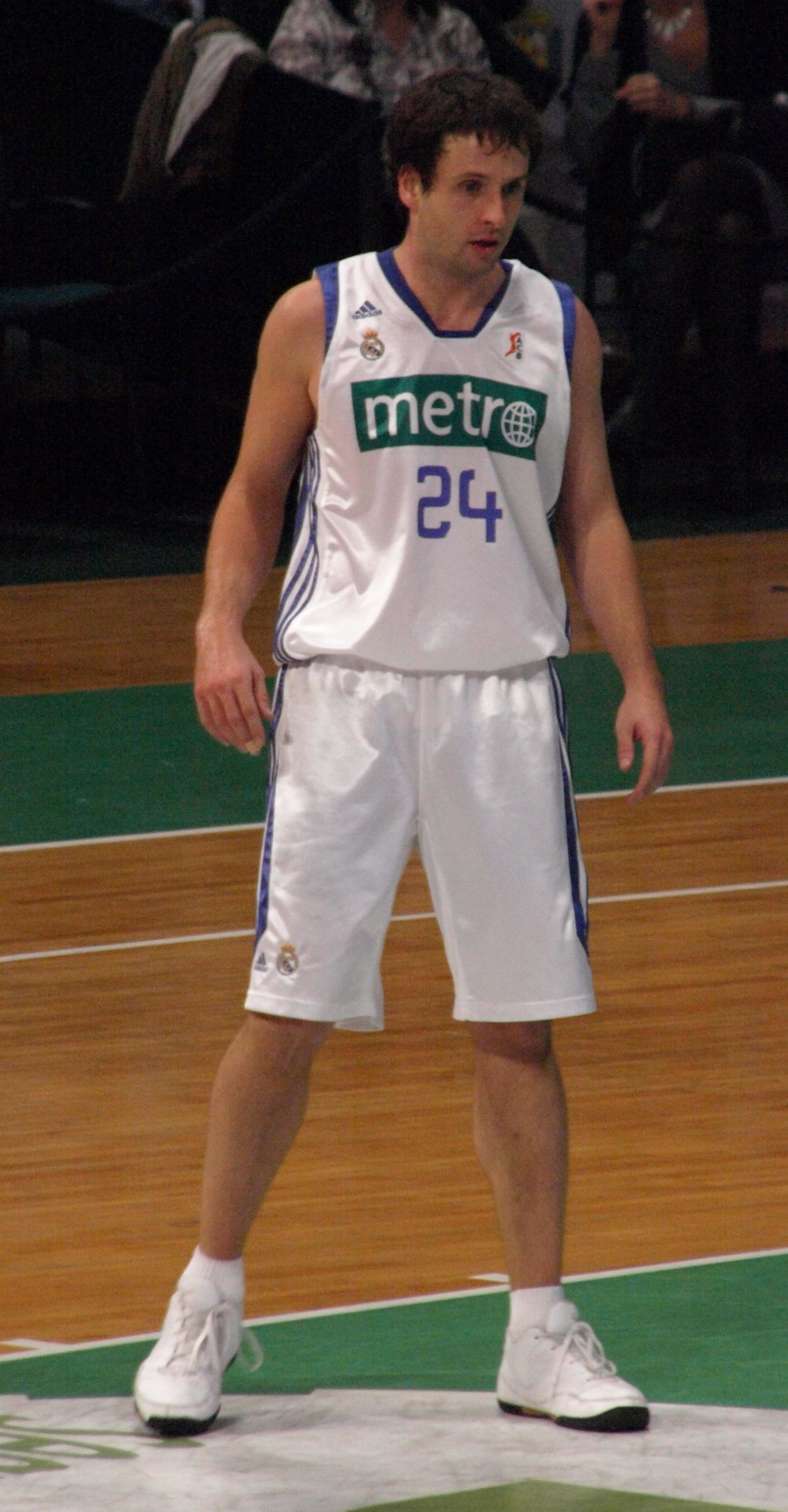
Raúl López.

Unlike FIFA, which awarded a trophy to the best club of the 20th century, FIBA did not officially designate one at the start of the 21st century. However, Real Madrid was undeniably the most decorated and successful basketball club of the 20th century, with 51 national titles and 21 international titles, making it FIBA’s most decorated club.

In the 2000–01 season, finishing as runners-up in both the league and cup (losing to Barcelona in both), Florentino Pérez named Emiliano Rodríguez honorary president of the basketball department (and in 2009, of the Veterans’ Association), one of the greatest players in European basketball history, honoring his contributions to spreading Real Madrid’s name on the court.

In the 2002–03 season, under coach Javier Imbroda, the department did not achieve the successes of the football team during the club’s centenary year, missing the league playoffs for the first time. The following season, with Argentine Julio Lamas on the bench, they reached the ULEB Cup (Eurocup) final, losing to Hapoel Jerusalem B.C. 72–83, after a stellar campaign featuring Bennet with 22 points and Kamabala with 19, alongside players such as Lucas Victoriano and Alfonso Reyes.

This drought ended with Božidar Maljković’s arrival as coach (2004–05, 2005–06), considered one of Europe’s best, and signings that became legends, such as Felipe Reyes, Louis Bullock, and Axel Hervelle, along with Frenchman Mickaël Gelabale, bringing new energy to the team. With the reintroduced Spanish Supercup in 2004, Real Madrid reached the final, losing to FC Barcelona by one point (74–75). They also reached the King’s Cup final (2004–05). In 2005, one of the most thrilling league finals occurred in the fifth game in Vitoria. Trailing by 8 points with 42 seconds left, Real Madrid mounted a series of quick attacks, culminating in Alberto Herreros’ iconic corner three-pointer, securing a 69–70 victory. Herreros, the ACB’s all-time leading scorer, joined the department’s management, with Lolo Sainz as director until his retirement, succeeded by Antonio Martín Espina.

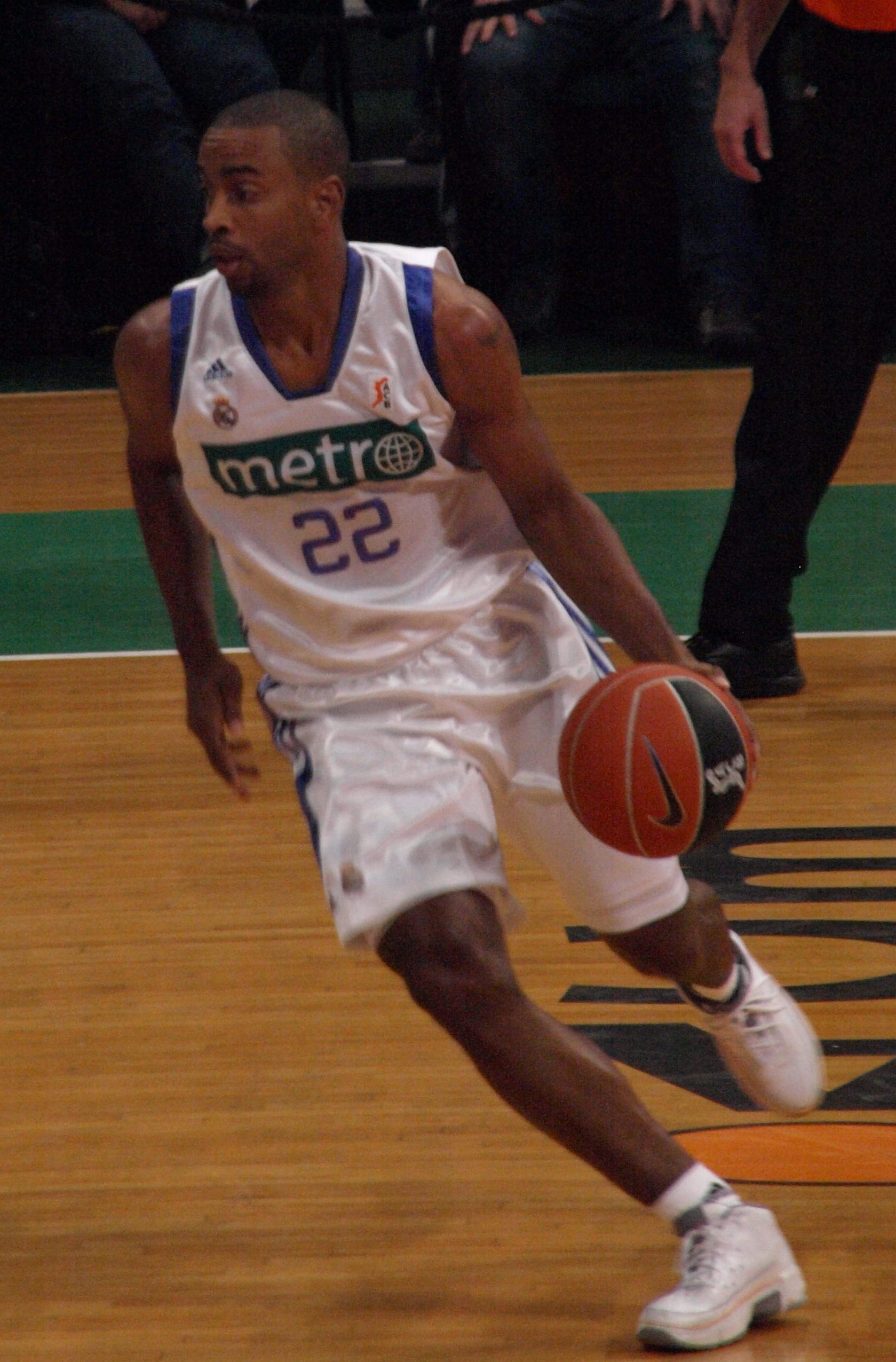
Louis Bullock, one of the club’s greatest scorers.

With the arrival of Ramón Calderón as president, Joan Plaza (2006/07, 2007/08, 2008/09) was appointed as a personal choice after failing to secure a more renowned coach. His value was soon proven, as in his first season (2006–07), he led the team to the ULEB Cup (EuroCup) and the 30th League title, while also reaching the Copa del Rey final. This season saw the emergence of a young point guard, Sergio Llull, who, in 2009, would pair with Sergio Rodríguez (returning from the NBA) to form one of the most dynamic backcourt duos. The ULEB Cup (EuroCup) was won against Lietuvos Rytas (75–87) at the Spiroudome in Charleroi, thanks to the performances of players such as Raúl López, Kerem Tunçeri, Louis Bullock, Charles Smith, Marko Tomas, Álex Mumbrú, Marko Milić, Venson Hamilton, Blagota Sekulić, Axel Hervelle, Felipe Reyes, Eduardo Hernández-Sonseca, Ratko Varda, Nedžad Sinanović, Richard Nguema, Pablo Aguilar, and Jan Fernando Martín (son of the legendary Fernando Martín), under Joan Plaza’s leadership. This title marked the club’s 15th European trophy and its 19th international title, making it the most decorated club in FIBA history (22nd overall, including the ACEB International Tournament).

The 2007/08 season was marked by the signing of Greek center Lazaros Papadopoulos, a European basketball star who failed to adapt and stayed for only one season. On October 11, 2007, Real Madrid defeated the Toronto Raptors 104–103 at the Palacio de Deportes de la Comunidad de Madrid during the NBA Europe Live Tour, becoming the fourth team to defeat an NBA franchise.

With Florentino Pérez’s return to the presidency in 2009 for his second term, Ettore Messina—a four-time European champion—was hired in the summer of that year. Messina left midway through his second season after failing to achieve the expected success, finishing as runner-up in the Supercopa and Copa del Rey twice (alongside Antonio Martín as department director). He was replaced by his assistant, Emanuele Molin, who led the team to the Euroleague Final Four after a 15-year absence. The team suffered one of its heaviest defeats in the Supercopa when they lost to FC Barcelona by 34 points. In 2009, Jorge Garbajosa joined the club for two seasons, and in 2010, Croatian Ante Tomić arrived.

Despite Florentino Pérez’s ambitious investment in basketball and hiring a high-profile coach, the expected results were not achieved. However, a turning point came with the appointment of Juan Carlos Sánchez Lázaro as technical director in 2010. The technical staff included former players committed to the department, such as Alberto Herreros as assistant manager (since 2005), Alberto Angulo as youth academy director in 2009, Clifford Luyk as technical advisor in 2009, and Emiliano Rodríguez as honorary president. This marked the beginning of a new direction for the historic basketball department, which celebrated its 75th anniversary in March 2006. The project took shape with the arrival of another former player, Pablo Laso, as head coach in the summer of 2011.

To mark the 20th anniversary of Fernando Martín’s death, a large image of Fernando Martín alongside the Real Madrid crest was displayed, with a banner reading “20 Years Later, Your Spirit Lives On,” organized by the Berserkers fan group and the entire Palacio Vistalegre (then the team’s home venue). The ACB also paid a tribute by calling a timeout in the 10th minute of the game (Martín’s jersey number), showing highlights of his career on the scoreboard.

The decade concluded with 1 ULEB Cup (EuroCup), 2 league titles, 7 CAM Tournaments, and 2 Christmas Tournaments as the most notable achievements. The International Christmas Tournament ended in 2004, with an epilogue in the summer of 2006, concluding one of the most prestigious international tournaments that, for decades, brought together top teams, initially organized by FIBA.

=== The Pablo Laso era (2011–2022) ===
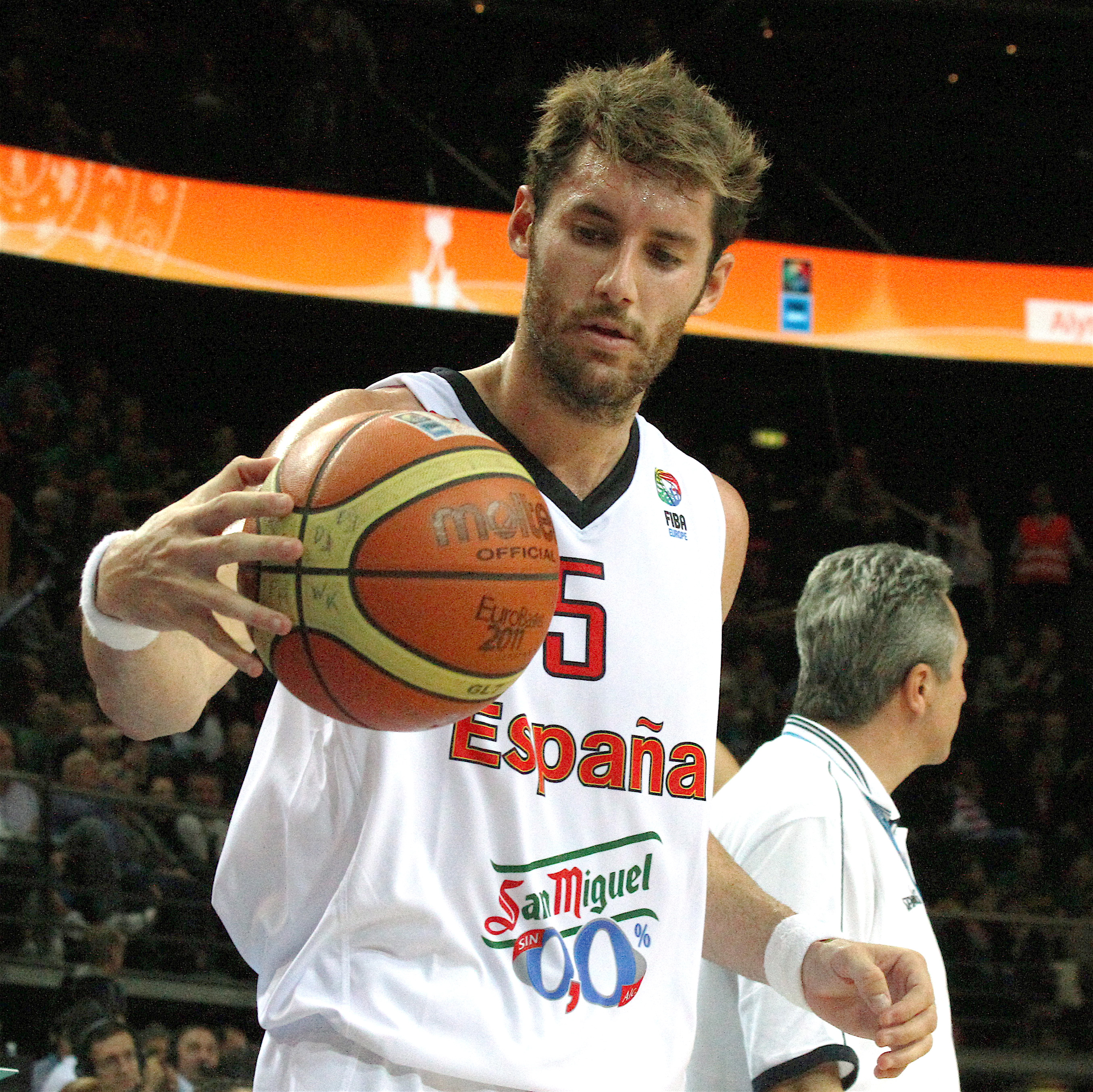
Rudy Fernández joined the club during the NBA lockout.

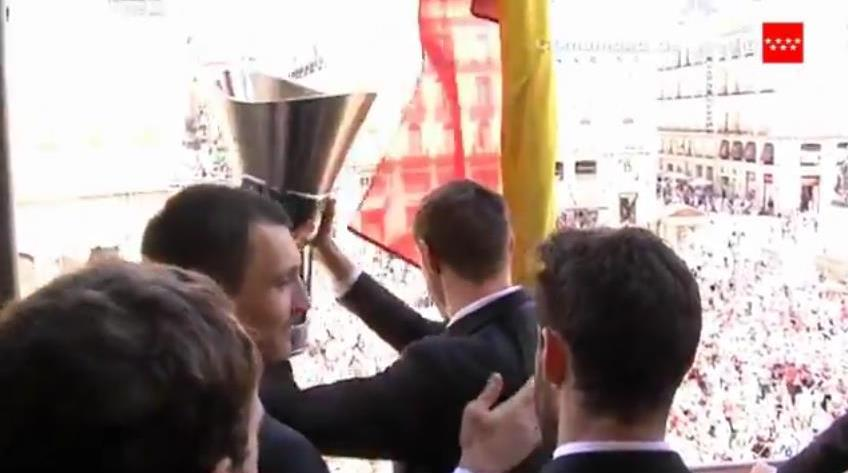
Players of the club present the ninth European Cup to their fans.

The new project and the board’s financial commitment to basketball took shape with the arrival of former player Pablo Laso as head coach in 2011. His offensive style was bolstered by signings of proven talent or high potential, such as Sergio Rodríguez, Jaycee Carroll, and NBA star Rudy Fernández as a key figure, (Note: In 2011 for a few months due to the NBA lockout, and definitively in 2012 as a full member.) alongside Felipe Reyes, Sergio Llull, and the breakout youth player Nikola Mirotić, laying the foundation to return the department to the top of European basketball. Even Serge Ibaka, a Spanish international, played for the team during the NBA lockout months.

Returning to the Palacio de los Deportes, the team won the Copa del Rey after a 19-year drought, defeating F.C. Barcelona 74–91 at the Palau Sant Jordi, with Llull scoring 23 points and Carroll 22, while also finishing as league and Supercopa runners-up, consolidating the project.

The following season, the team was strengthened with the signings of Tremmell Darden, Dontaye Draper, and Marcus Slaughter, coinciding with the departure of Ante Tomić. The team won the club’s second Supercopa de España, again against F.C. Barcelona, and secured its 31st league title, with Felipe Reyes earning MVP honors in the final, achieving 38 wins in 44 games. In Europe, the team reached the Euroleague Final Four after an 18-year absence, defeating Barcelona in the semifinals before losing the title to Olympiacos Piraeus 100–88. The subsequent seasons saw further national success with another Supercopa and Copa del Rey, with players such as Llull and Mirotić shining, and another Euroleague Final Four appearance, the 16th in club history. However, the title slipped away in the final, losing 98–86 to historic rival Maccabi Tel Aviv.

During this period, the team recorded the best start in the department’s history with 31 consecutive wins—16 in the league, 13 in the Euroleague, and 2 in the Supercopa—surpassing the previous record of 23 wins from the 1960–61 season under Ferrándiz. For this achievement, the team received a commemorative trophy, setting a new record of 28 consecutive league wins. (Note: Surpassing the ACB-era record of 27 wins in the 1984–85 season, also set by Real Madrid.)

==== European Champions: The Historic "Quintuple" ====
2014/15 Season

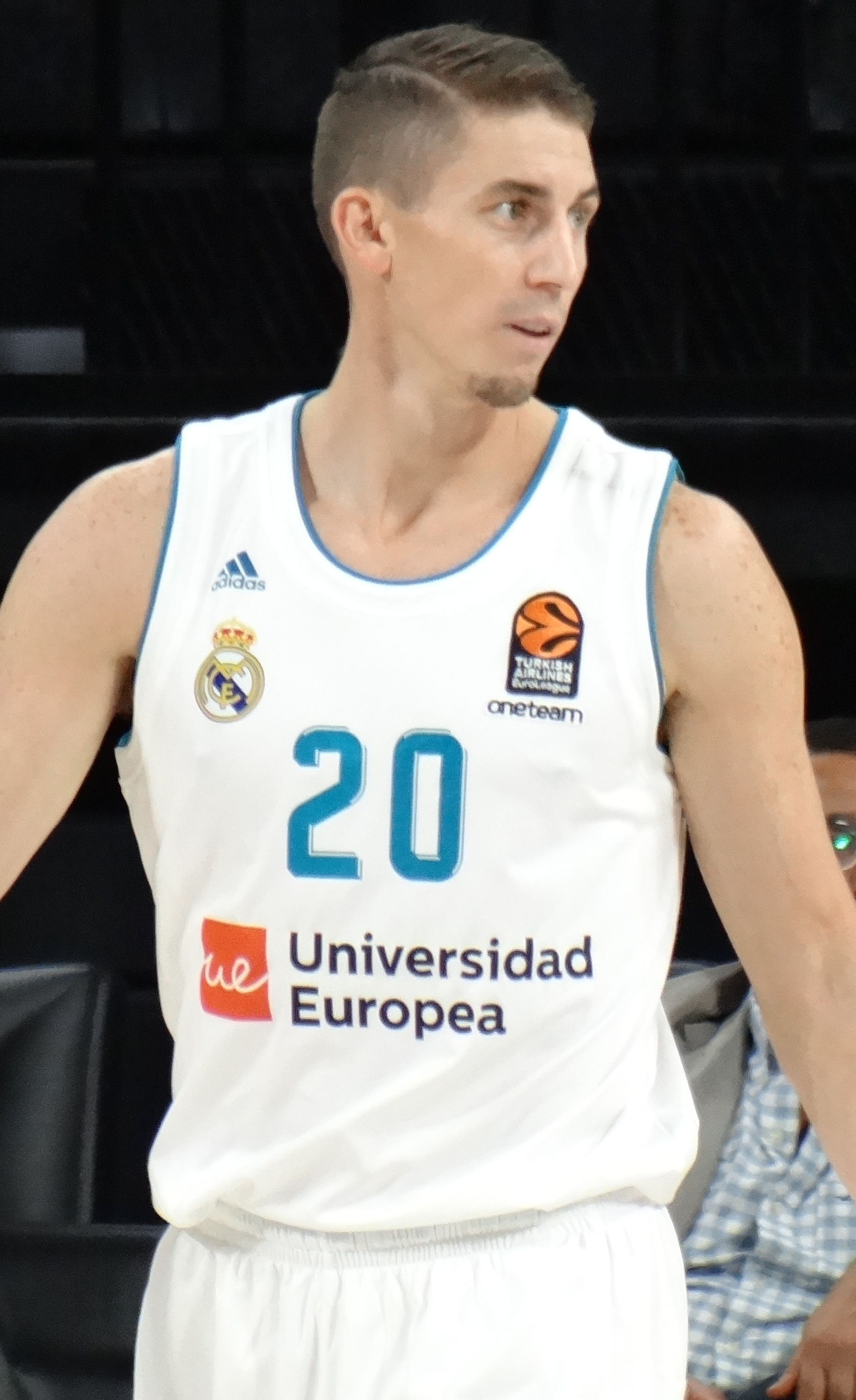
On November 24, 2016, Jaycee Carroll surpassed Bullock as the foreign player with the most games for Real Madrid (324).

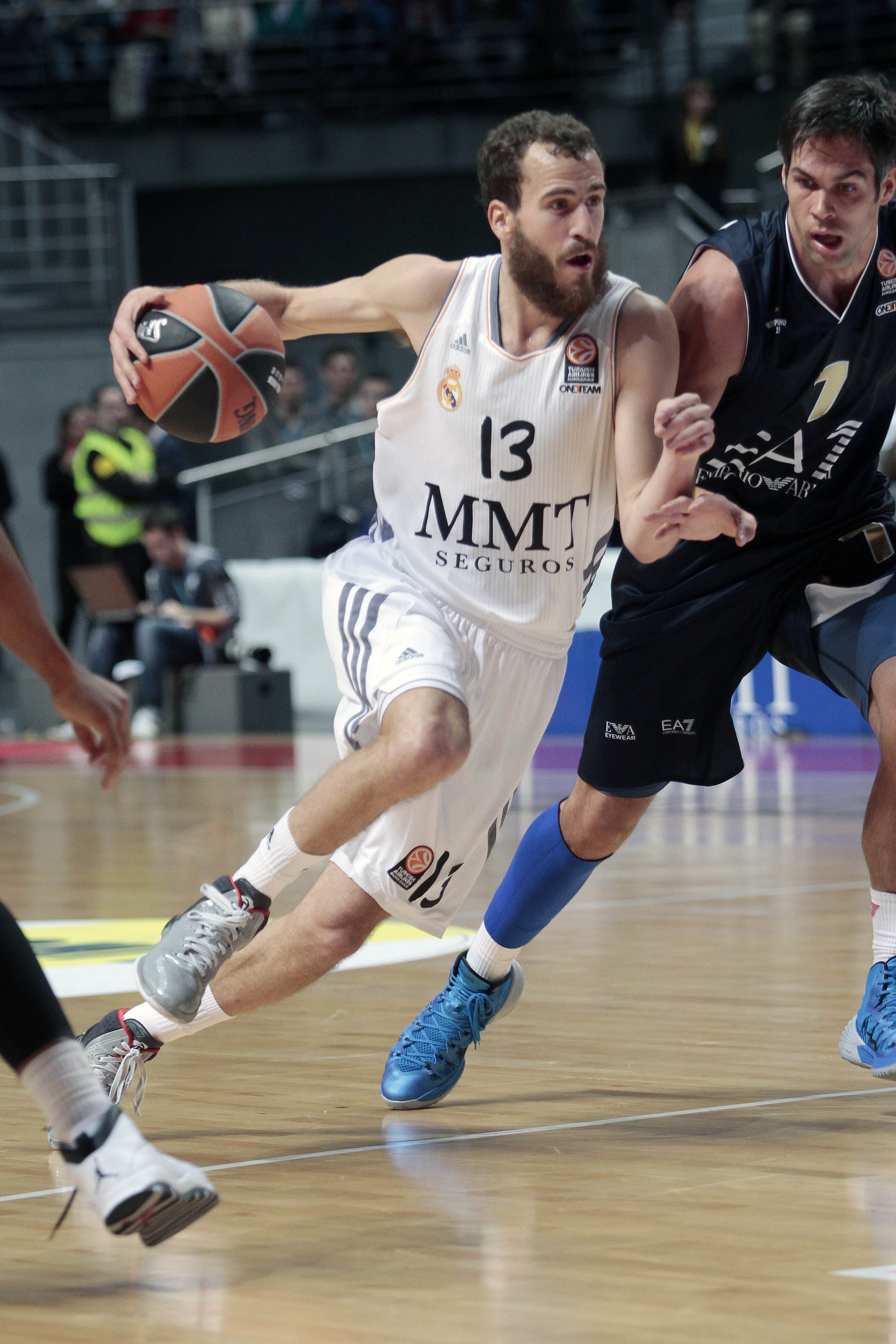
Sergio Rodríguez against EA7 Emporio Armani in a 2013/14 Euroleague game.

In the 2014–15 season, confidence was maintained in Pablo Laso’s project despite not yet winning the coveted Euroleague. With new assistants Chus Mateo and Žan Tabak (a player in 2001/02 and assistant to Joan Plaza in 2007/08), the team was bolstered by signings such as K. C. Rivers, Facundo Campazzo, Jonas Mačiulis, Andrés Nocioni, and Gustavo Ayón, following the departures of Tremmell Darden, Dontaye Draper, and Nikola Mirotić (to the NBA). The season began with another Supercopa de España, defeating FC Barcelona 99–78 for the third consecutive time (the club’s fourth Supercopa). Earlier, the team won the inaugural Copa EuroAmericana de Básquet in the preseason, a friendly tournament. The CAM Tournament was not held for the first time in its history due to scheduling conflicts, after Real Madrid had won the last 10 editions consecutively.

The season started spectacularly, with the team holding a Euroleague record of 21 consecutive home wins (lasting 20 months, from April 4, 2013, to November 5, 2014). Real Madrid became the first ACB team to start three consecutive seasons undefeated in the league (over 70 games as regular-season leader). Only twice in basketball history had a team achieved such a start: in 1958–59, 1959–60, and 1960–61, and again in 1972–73, 1973–74, and 1974–75. Four decades later, Real Madrid replicated this with a 27–0 start in 2013–14 and 14–0 in 2012–13. They remained the only undefeated team in Europe at the start of the season, falling to Anadolu Efes in the final second, while leading in offensive stats, percentages, and averages.

On November 30, 2014, nearing the 25th anniversary of Fernando Martín’s death (December 3, 1989), Real Madrid paid a tribute during a game against CAI Zaragoza, the same opponent from that tragic day. During warm-ups, players wore jerseys with F. Martín’s name and number 10 (the only retired number in his honor). Before the game, an event featured his brother Antonio Martín and former teammates (Corbalán, Romay, etc.). Children displayed a banner representing Martín’s retired jersey, and a video tribute was shown on the screens. Captain Felipe Reyes presented Antonio Martín with a signed team jersey, and Rafa Rullán, president of the Veterans Association, presented a plaque with Fernando Martín’s image and the inscription “Always in Our Hearts.” The Berserkers and Ojos del Tigre fan groups displayed banners reading “25 Years Later, Your Spirit Lives On” and “25 Years Remembering You.” The team dedicated the victory to the legendary number 10, an icon of Madridismo.

Once again, Real Madrid faced FC Barcelona in the Euroleague Top 16, delivering a commanding 97–73 performance, showcasing their dominance. Before the game, Felipe Reyes was honored as the Euroleague’s all-time leading rebounder with 1,288 rebounds, and Rudy Fernández was named MVP of the sixth round. In the Copa del Rey, the team defended their title for the second consecutive year, defeating F.C. Barcelona 71–77, with Rudy Fernández named MVP of the final and both Sergio Rodríguez and Rudy included in the All-Tournament Team.

In their relentless pursuit of the ninth European Cup, Real Madrid reached the Final Four for the third consecutive year (their seventh in the format), hosted in Madrid, after defeating Anadolu Efes 3–1 in the quarterfinals. Felipe Reyes was named to the All-Euroleague Team. After beating Fenerbahçe in the semifinals, they reached their 17th Euroleague final, facing Olympiacos (as they did two years prior, and in their last Euroleague title win). In a thrilling game, with Andrés Nocioni named Final Four MVP, Real Madrid won their ninth European Cup at the Palacio de Deportes (the 23rd international title, 20th official FIBA title, excluding the Christmas Tournament). That same weekend, the junior team won the Euroleague Junior Tournament. This marked the 11th time the club won both a national and an international title in the same season. At the end of the season, Pablo Laso was named Euroleague Coach of the Year.

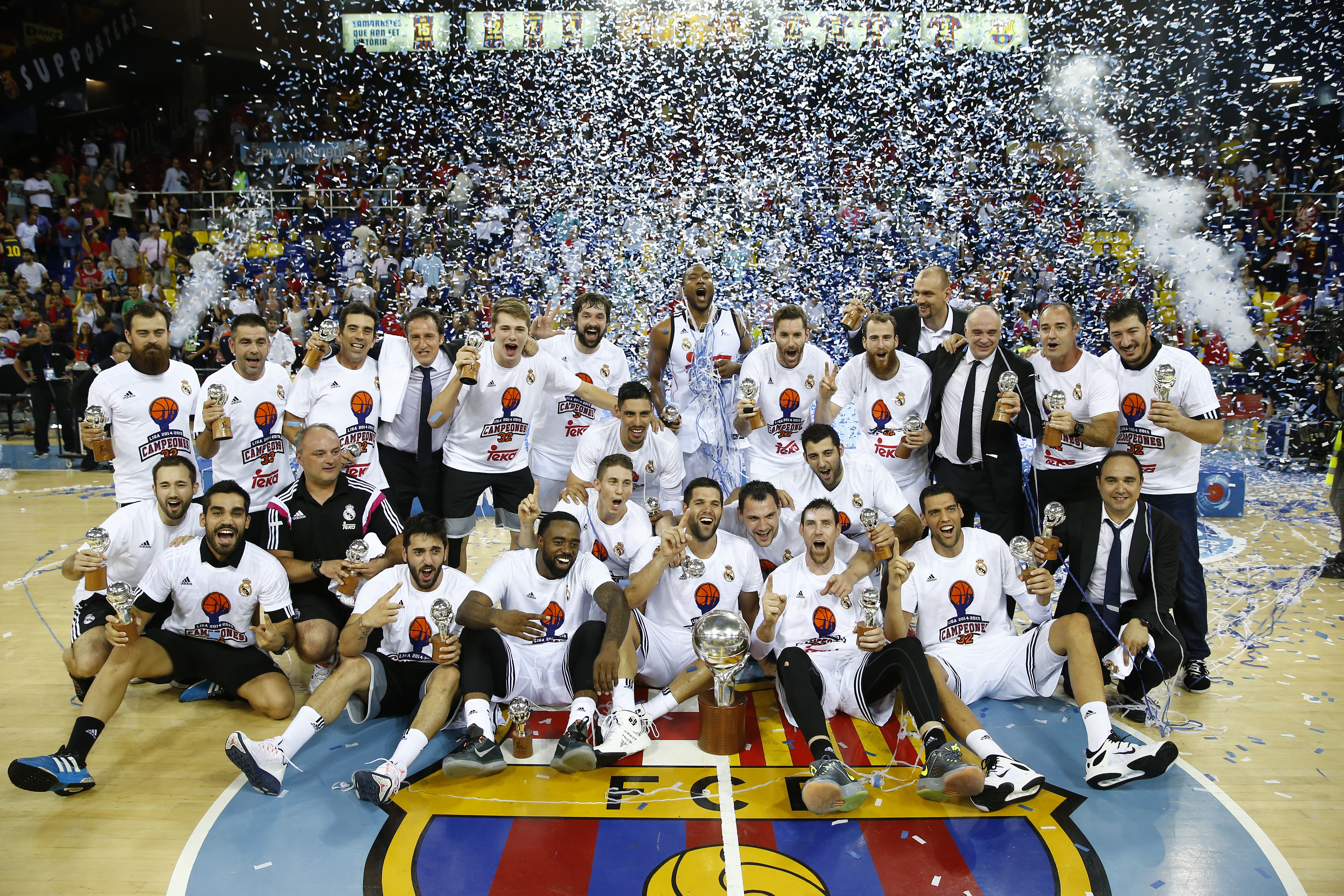
The 32nd League title, won at the Palau Blaugrana, marked not only a new domestic double but also the third Triple Crown in club history, alongside the Supercopa won earlier, culminating in a historic quadruple of titles in the 2014/15 season.

For the third consecutive year, Real Madrid won the ACB regular-season title (their 11th) and Pablo Laso was named ACB Coach of the Year for the third straight year. Felipe Reyes was named regular-season MVP and joined Sergio Llull in the All-ACB Team. For the fourth consecutive year, the team reached the ACB Finals, facing F.C. Barcelona for the fourth time. They won 3–0 at the Palau Blaugrana (their fifth trophy celebrated at their rival’s home in 21 years and their 32nd league title, matching their football counterparts at the time). It was their 10th playoff final victory out of 17 and the second 3–0 sweep since 1994, with five players scoring in double figures, led by Jaycee Carroll’s 19 points. Sergio Llull was named Finals MVP, achieving all four titles contested that season. This was the third final that season in which they defeated F.C. Barcelona.

This historic season saw Real Madrid achieve their 11th domestic double (league and cup), a Spanish record, and their third Triple Crown (league, cup, and Euroleague: 1964/65, 1973/74, 2014/15), making them the Spanish club and second European club with the most Triple Crowns. The 2014/15 season was historic, with Real Madrid winning the Euroleague, league, Copa del Rey, and Supercopa, plus the regular-season title, achieving an unprecedented quadruple in Spain. Only two European teams had previously won the four major competitions (European Cup, Intercontinental, league, and cup): Mobilgirgi Varese (1970, 1973) and Olimpia Milano (1987). This was the department’s best season in terms of official national and international titles, with 64 wins in 78 games (2–0 in Supercopa, 3–0 in Copa, 24–6 in Euroleague, 27–7 in ACB regular season, 8–1 in playoffs), an 82% win rate. Additionally, the club won Spanish championships in three youth categories (Junior, Cadet A, and Infantil A) for the first time, in addition to the Euroleague Junior, Mini Copa ACB (Infantil A), Madrid Championships (Junior and Cadet A), and the EBA League Tournament (Real Madrid B, first in Group B but fourth in the promotion phase), among other youth successes. The young prospect Luka Dončić debuted with the senior team.

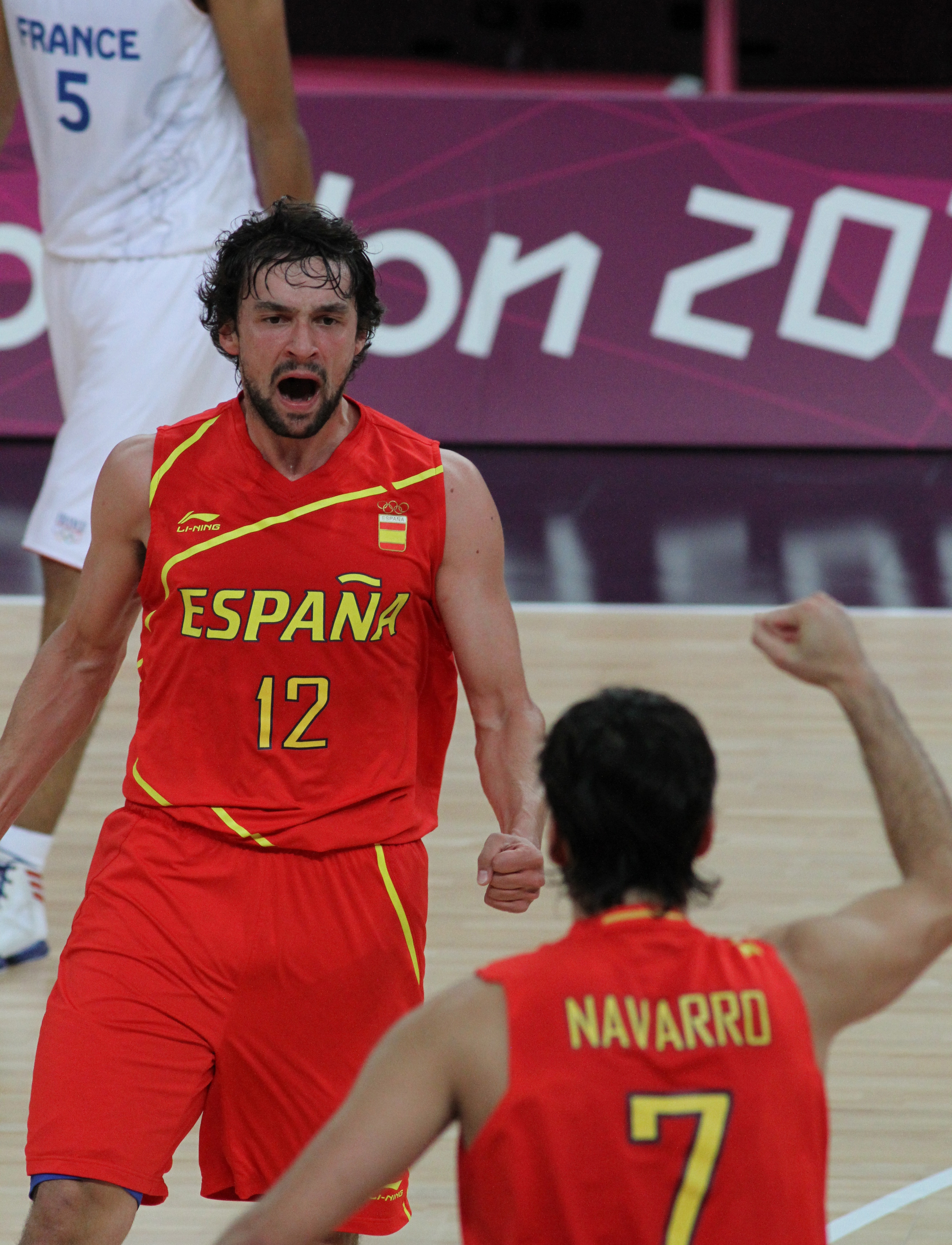
Sergio Llull, a club and Spanish national team icon (2012 London Olympics).

2015/16 Season: Following the departures of Salah Mejri, Ioannis Bourousis, Marcus Slaughter, K. C. Rivers (due to non-EU status issues), and the loans of Facundo Campazzo and Alex Suárez, the team signed Trey Thompkins and Jeffery Taylor, promoted Luka Dončić after his standout youth performance, and welcomed back Willy Hernangómez from loan. This marked the start of Laso’s 5.0 project for the 2015/16 season, with the team now based at their own facilities in the Real Madrid Sports City in Valdebebas.

The season’s standout signing was Sergio Llull, who declined a $21 million, three-year offer from the Houston Rockets—the highest for an NBA rookie—to stay with Real Madrid, stating:

“Many kids dream of playing in the NBA; mine was to play for Real Madrid, and I want to keep fulfilling that dream.”

— Sergio Llull on his career.

After winning the Ciudad de Córdoba Tournament (without six players at the Eurobasket final), the season officially began with the FIBA Intercontinental Cup (World Cup), revived by FIBA in 2013 as a global club competition between the European and Americas champions. Real Madrid, the most decorated team with four titles (three Intercontinental Cups and one World Club Championship), entered as the reigning European champion. They faced Brazil’s Bauru in a two-game series, losing the first 91–90 after leading by 17 but winning the second 91–79 in São Paulo’s Ibirapuera Gymnasium, where they had won their fourth Intercontinental Cup 34 years earlier. This secured their fifth global title (Llull was named Finals MVP) and a “quintuple” (five titles) in a year from September 27, 2014, to September 27, 2015, including four titles in 2015 (Supercopa, Copa, Euroleague, League, and Intercontinental). This was their 21st FIBA-ULEB-recognized international title, cementing their status as FIBA’s most decorated club. Real Madrid became the first club to hold simultaneous world champion titles in football and basketball. Had the Madrid Championship (official regional competition) and the ULEB European Super Cup (in development) been active, up to seven titles could have been possible.

In the 2015/16 Supercopa de España, Real Madrid fell in the semifinals to Unicaja Málaga, affected by the physical toll and travel from the Intercontinental Cup and Eurobasket. Jaycee Carroll won the ACB Three-Point Contest with 22 points, defeating Mallet in the final.

A friendly match against the Boston Celtics on October 8, 2015, in Madrid, part of the NBA Global Games, echoed the 1988 FIBA-NBA Open-World Championship final at the same venue. The score mirrored that game (96–111), with Real Madrid falling short of defeating the Celtics.

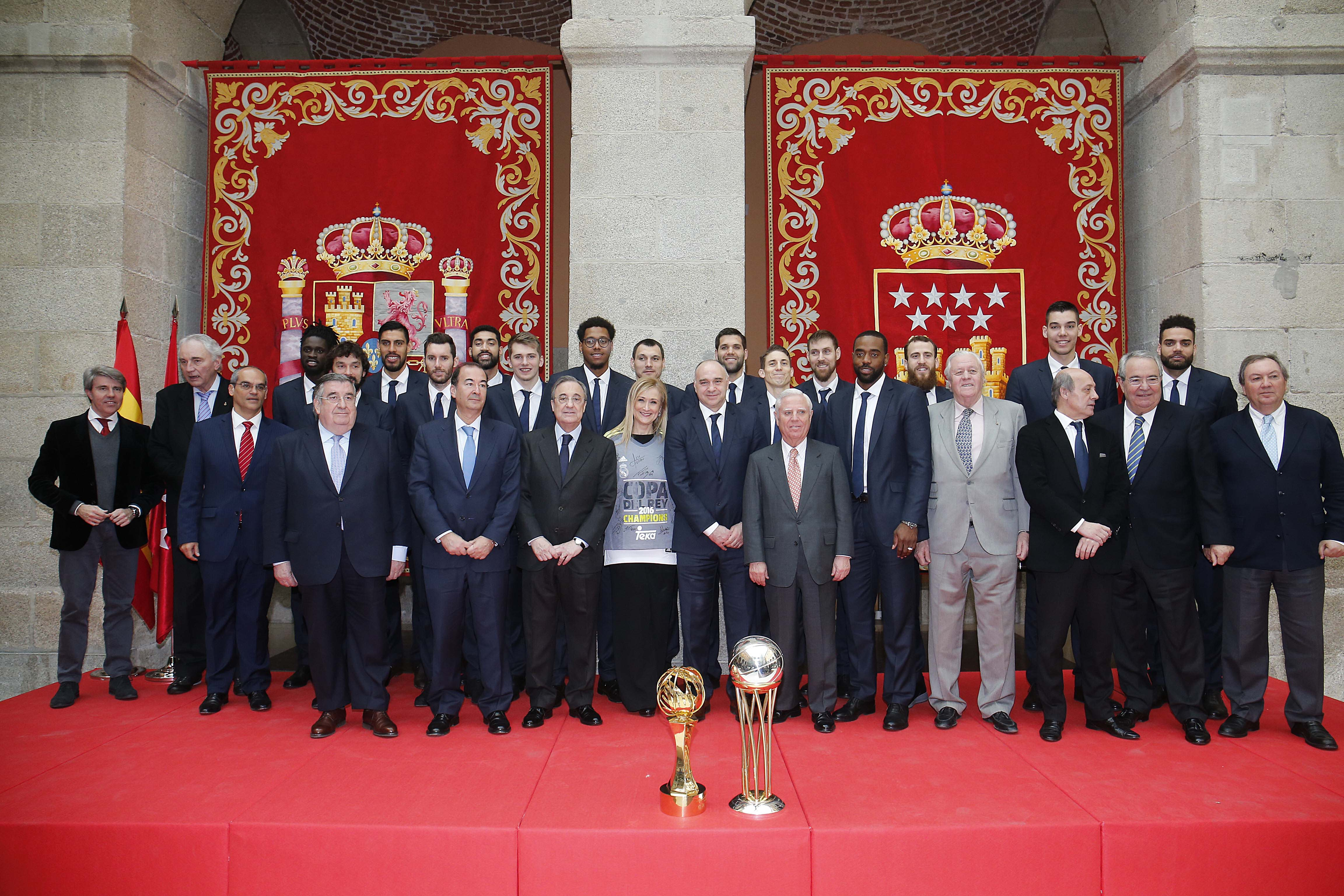
The Intercontinental Cup and Copa del Rey were presented at the headquarters of the Community of Madrid.

In the winter transfer window, after Rudy’s injury, K. C. Rivers was re-signed after resolving his non-EU status and a brief stint at Bayern, alongside Maurice Ndour and Augusto Lima. Center Samba Ndiaye debuted with the senior team.

The second title of the season was the Copa del Rey, won for the third consecutive year—a historic feat in the current format—defeating Gran Canaria 81–85, with Gustavo Ayón named MVP. The Infantil A team won the Mini Copa ACB for the fourth consecutive time, defeating Joventut 102–50, with Garuba as MVP.

The team qualified for the Euroleague quarterfinals for the fourth consecutive year but failed to reach the Final Four, losing to Fenerbahçe.

Real Madrid won their 33rd league title, their second consecutive, defeating F.C. Barcelona 3–1, marking their 1,500th league victory in a packed Palacio de Deportes. Llull earned Finals MVP honors for the second straight year, joining Arvydas Sabonis as the only players to achieve this consecutively. This was the club’s 12th domestic double (second consecutive), a Spanish record, alongside the Intercontinental Cup. The Infantil A team also won the Spanish Championship. Dončić and Hernangómez were named to the ACB Best Young Team, and Pablo Laso was named ACB Coach of the Year.

==== Real Madrid under Pablo Laso 6.0 ====
Following the departure of Sergio Rodríguez, who penned a farewell letter before returning to the NBA after a remarkable cycle, alongside Willy Hernangómez and Maurice Ndour to the New York Knicks, and K. C. Rivers, Facundo Campazzo (previously on loan), and Augusto Lima, the new season began with Álex Suárez (returning from loan at Bilbao Basket), the return of Dontaye Draper, and the signings of power forwards Othello Hunter (from Olympiacos) and Anthony Randolph (from Lokomotiv Kuban). In the Supercopa de España semifinals, Real Madrid faced F.C. Barcelona, losing 93–99 after a strong performance by Tyrese Rice. Jaycee Carroll defended his ACB Three-Point Contest title.

The team that wrote the club’s greatest chapter with the “quintuple” faced a new challenge: defeating an NBA franchise. On October 3, 2016, during the NBA Global Games, Real Madrid beat the Oklahoma City Thunder 142–137 in an unforgettable game. Trailing by 22 points, they forced overtime with a last-second three-pointer by Llull, who shone, and sealed the win in overtime—the club’s second victory against an NBA team. The game featured a new short-sleeved blue kit, a first since the club’s early days, worn for the NBA visit.

In an ACB game, Real Madrid overwhelmed Valencia 75–94, led by Dončić, with Llull, Rudy, Randolph, and Ayón excelling, including a decisive 18–34 run. Llull became the club’s all-time assist leader with 1,160, surpassing Sergio Rodríguez.

The 2016/17 Euroleague introduced a new format after another split with FIBA, featuring a 30-game round-robin league, with the top eight advancing to a best-of-five quarterfinal playoff, followed by the Final Four. Despite the split, the Euroleague remained the premier European club competition. The season opened with Real Madrid defeating Olympiacos 83–65, echoing the 2000 split. Felipe Reyes became the Euroleague’s all-time leading rebounder with 1,500 rebounds. A consequence of the FIBA-Euroleague rift was that the FIBA Intercontinental Cup no longer featured the Euroleague champion but the winner of the third-tier FIBA Europe Cup.

On November 17, 2016, a historic moment in the Madrid-Barça rivalry occurred during the eighth Euroleague round at the Palau Blaugrana. Real Madrid delivered a crushing 63–102 victory, described as a “historic thrashing” by the press, setting multiple records: the largest margin in the Palau Blaugrana (surpassing a +23 from 1967), Barcelona’s worst European defeat, the first time they conceded 100 points (previous record was –38, also against Real Madrid), Real Madrid’s largest margin against Barcelona (sixth-largest in their rivalry), and the biggest road win in El Clásico history.
