= 2001 XXXVII FIBA International Christmas Tournament =

2001 XXXVII FIBA International Christmas Tournament "Trofeo Raimundo Saporta-Memorial Fernando Martín"
- Sport: Basketball
- Finals champions: (Russia) Ural Great Perm
- Runners-up: (Spain) Real Madrid

FIBA International Christmas Tournament seasons
- ← 2000 2002 →

The 2001 XXXVII FIBA International Christmas Tournament "Trofeo Raimundo Saporta-Memorial Fernando Martín" was the 37th edition of the FIBA International Christmas Tournament. It took place at Raimundo Saporta Pavilion, Madrid, Spain, on 25 December 2001 with the participations of Real Madrid and Ural Great Perm.

== Final ==
December 25, 2001

Team 1	Score	Team 2
Real Madrid (Spain)	69–80	(Russia) Ural Great Perm

2001 XXXVII FIBA International Christmas Tournament
"Trofeo Raimundo Saporta-Memorial Fernando Martín" Champions

Ural Great Perm
1st title
