= 1979 XV FIBA International Christmas Tournament =

1979 XV FIBA International Christmas Tournament "Trofeo Raimundo Saporta"
- Sport: Basketball
- Finals champions: Soviet Union
- Runners-up: (Spain) Real Madrid

FIBA International Christmas Tournament seasons
- ← 1978 1980 →

The 1979 XV FIBA International Christmas Tournament "Trofeo Raimundo Saporta" was the 15th edition of the FIBA International Christmas Tournament. It took place at Sports City of Real Madrid Pavilion, Madrid, Spain, on 24, 25 and 26 December 1979 with the participations of Spanish club sides Real Madrid and Joventut Freixenet, a Soviet Union senior national team, and an American AiA amateur team.

== League stage ==
Day 1, December 24, 1979

Team 1	Score	Team 2
Real Madrid (Spain)	106–93	(Spain) Joventut Freixenet
Soviet Union	104–87	(United States) Athletes in Action

Day 2, December 25, 1979

Team 1	Score	Team 2
Real Madrid (Spain)	115–88	(United States) Athletes in Action
Soviet Union	91–83	(Spain) Joventut Freixenet

Day 3, December 26, 1979

Team 1	Score	Team 2
Real Madrid (Spain)	102–106	Soviet Union
Joventut Freixenet (Spain)	86–89	(United States) Athletes in Action

== Final standings ==
	Team	Pld	Pts	W	L	PF	PA
1.	Soviet Union	3	6	3	0	301	272
2.	(Spain) Real Madrid	3	5	2	1	323	287
3.	(United States) Athletes in Action	3	4	1	2	264	305
4.	(Spain) Joventut Freixenet	3	3	0	3	262	286

1979 XV FIBA International Christmas Tournament
"Trofeo Raimundo Saporta" Champions

Soviet Union
1st title
