= 2000 XXXVI FIBA International Christmas Tournament =

2000 XXXVI FIBA International Christmas Tournament "Trofeo Raimundo Saporta-Memorial Fernando Martín"
- Sport: Basketball
- Finals champions: (Spain) Real Madrid Teka
- Runners-up: (Brazil) São Paulo All-Stars

FIBA International Christmas Tournament seasons
- ← 1999 2001 →

The 2000 XXXVI FIBA International Christmas Tournament "Trofeo Raimundo Saporta-Memorial Fernando Martín" was the 36th edition of the FIBA International Christmas Tournament. It took place at Raimundo Saporta Pavilion, Madrid, Spain, on 25 December 2000 with the participations of Real Madrid Teka (champions of the 1999–2000 Liga ACB) and São Paulo All-Stars.

== Final ==
December 25, 2000

Team 1	Score	Team 2
Real Madrid Teka (Spain)	111–83	(Brazil) São Paulo All-Stars

2000 XXXVI FIBA International Christmas Tournament
"Trofeo Raimundo Saporta-Memorial Fernando Martín" Champions

Real Madrid Teka
23rd title
