= 1998 XXXIV FIBA International Christmas Tournament =

1998 XXXIV FIBA International Christmas Tournament "Trofeo Raimundo Saporta-Memorial Fernando Martín"
- Sport: Basketball
- Finals champions: (Russia) CSKA Moscow
- Runners-up: (Spain) Real Madrid Teka

FIBA International Christmas Tournament seasons
- ← 1997 1999 →

The 1999 XXXV FIBA International Christmas Tournament "Trofeo Raimundo Saporta-Memorial Fernando Martín" was the 34th edition of the FIBA International Christmas Tournament. It took place at Raimundo Saporta Pavilion, Madrid, Spain, on 24 and 25 December 1998 with the participations of Real Madrid Teka, CSKA Moscow (champions of the 1997–98 Super League A), Partizan and Union Olimpija (runners-up of the 1997–98 1. Slovenska Košarkarska Liga).

== Semifinals ==
December 24, 1998

Team 1	Score	Team 2
Real Madrid Teka (Spain)	82–77	(Federal Republic of Yugoslavia) Partizan
CSKA Moscow (Russia)	93–71	(Slovenia) Union Olimpija

== Third place game ==
December 25, 1998

Team 1	Score	Team 2
Union Olimpija (Slovenia)	62–66	(Federal Republic of Yugoslavia) Partizan

== Final ==
December 25, 1998

Team 1	Score	Team 2
Real Madrid Teka (Spain)	77–84	(Russia) CSKA Moscow

1998 XXXIV FIBA International Christmas Tournament
"Trofeo Raimundo Saporta-Memorial Fernando Martín" Champions

CSKA Moscow
1st title

== Final standings ==
	Team
1.	(Russia) CSKA Moscow
2.	(Spain) Real Madrid Teka
3.	(Federal Republic of Yugoslavia) Partizan
4.	(Slovenia) Union Olimpija
