= 1971 VII FIBA International Christmas Tournament =

1971 VII FIBA International Christmas Tournament "Trofeo Raimundo Saporta"
- Sport: Basketball
- Finals champions: (United States) North Carolina Tar Heels
- Runners-up: (Spain) Real Madrid

FIBA International Christmas Tournament seasons
- ← 1970 1972 →

The 1971 VII FIBA International Christmas Tournament "Trofeo Raimundo Saporta" was the 7th edition of the FIBA International Christmas Tournament. It took place at Sports City of Real Madrid Pavilion, Madrid, Spain, on 24, 25 and 26 December 1971 with the participations of Real Madrid (champions of the 1970–71 Liga Española de Baloncesto), North Carolina Tar Heels, Juventud Schweppes (runners-up of the 1970–71 Copa del Rey de Baloncesto) and Unión Española.

== League stage ==
Day 1, December 24, 1971

Team 1	Score	Team 2
Real Madrid (Spain)	89–80	(Spain) Juventud Schweppes
North Carolina Tar Heels (United States)	87–65	(Chile) Unión Española

Day 2, December 25, 1971

Team 1	Score	Team 2
Real Madrid (Spain)	107–90	(Chile) Unión Española
North Carolina Tar Heels (United States)	87–74	(Spain) Juventud Schweppes

Day 3, December 26, 1971

Team 1	Score	Team 2
Real Madrid (Spain)	77–83	(United States) North Carolina Tar Heels
Juventud Schweppes (Spain)	81–61	(Chile) Unión Española

== Final standings ==
	Team	Pld	Pts	W	L	PF	PA
1.	(United States) North Carolina Tar Heels	3	6	3	0	257	216
2.	(Spain) Real Madrid	3	5	2	1	273	253
3.	(Spain) Juventud Schweppes	3	4	1	2	235	237
4.	(Chile) Unión Española	3	3	0	3	216	275

1971 VII FIBA International Christmas Tournament
"Trofeo Raimundo Saporta" Champions

North Carolina Tar Heels
1st title
