= 1972 VIII FIBA International Christmas Tournament =

1972 VIII FIBA International Christmas Tournament "Trofeo Raimundo Saporta"
- Sport: Basketball
- Finals champions: (Spain) Real Madrid
- Runners-up: (Brazil) Palmeiras

FIBA International Christmas Tournament seasons
- ← 1971 1973 →

The 1972 VIII FIBA International Christmas Tournament "Trofeo Raimundo Saporta" was the 8th edition of the FIBA International Christmas Tournament. It took place at Sports City of Real Madrid Pavilion, Madrid, Spain, on 24, 25 and 26 December 1972 with the participations of Real Madrid (champions of the 1971–72 Liga Española de Baloncesto), Palmeiras, Virginia Cavaliers and Estudiantes Monteverde.

== League stage ==
Day 1, December 24, 1972

Team 1	Score	Team 2
Real Madrid (Spain)	89–70	(Spain) Estudiantes Monteverde
Palmeiras (Brazil)	84–76	(United States) Virginia Cavaliers

Day 2, December 25, 1972

Team 1	Score	Team 2
Real Madrid (Spain)	86–65	(Brazil) Palmeiras
Estudiantes Monteverde (Spain)	79–94	(United States) Virginia Cavaliers

Day 3, December 26, 1972

Team 1	Score	Team 2
Real Madrid (Spain)	97–72	(United States) Virginia Cavaliers
Palmeiras (Brazil)	88–67	(Spain) Estudiantes Monteverde

== Final standings ==
	Team	Pld	Pts	W	L	PF	PA
1.	(Spain) Real Madrid	3	6	3	0	272	207
2.	(Brazil) Palmeiras	3	5	2	1	237	229
3.	(United States) Virginia Cavaliers	3	4	1	2	242	260
4.	(Spain) Estudiantes Monteverde	3	3	0	3	216	271

1972 VIII FIBA International Christmas Tournament
"Trofeo Raimundo Saporta" Champions

Real Madrid
5th title
