= 2002 XXXVIII FIBA International Christmas Tournament =

2002 XXXVIII FIBA International Christmas Tournament "Trofeo Raimundo Saporta-Memorial Fernando Martín"
- Sport: Basketball
- Finals champions: (Israel) Maccabi Tel Aviv
- Runners-up: (Spain) Real Madrid

FIBA International Christmas Tournament seasons
- ← 2001 2003 →

The 2002 XXXVIII FIBA International Christmas Tournament "Trofeo Raimundo Saporta-Memorial Fernando Martín" was the 38th edition of the FIBA International Christmas Tournament. It took place at Raimundo Saporta Pavilion, Madrid, Spain, on 25 December 2002 with the participations of Real Madrid and Maccabi Tel Aviv.

== Final ==
December 25, 2002

Team 1	Score	Team 2
Real Madrid (Spain)	71–87	(Israel) Maccabi Tel Aviv

2002 XXXVIII FIBA International Christmas Tournament
"Trofeo Raimundo Saporta-Memorial Fernando Martín" Champions

Maccabi Tel Aviv
1st title
