= 1999 XXXV FIBA International Christmas Tournament =

1999 XXXV FIBA International Christmas Tournament "Trofeo Raimundo Saporta-Memorial Fernando Martín"
- Sport: Basketball
- Finals champions: (Greece) Panathinaikos
- Runners-up: (Spain) Real Madrid Teka

FIBA International Christmas Tournament seasons
- ← 1998 2000 →

The 1999 XXXV FIBA International Christmas Tournament "Trofeo Raimundo Saporta-Memorial Fernando Martín" was the 35th edition of the FIBA International Christmas Tournament. It took place at Raimundo Saporta Pavilion, Madrid, Spain, on 24 and 25 December 1999 with the participations of Real Madrid Teka, Panathinaikos (champions of the 1998–99 Greek Basket League), Partizan (champions of the 1998–99 Yugoslav Basketball Cup) and Zadar (runners-up of the 1998–99 A-1 Liga).

== Semifinals ==
December 24, 1999

| Team 1 | Score | Team 2 |
|---|---|---|
| Real Madrid Teka (Spain) | 67–65 | (Federal Republic of Yugoslavia) Partizan |
| Panathinaikos (Greece) | 65–60 | (Croatia) Zadar |

== 3rd place game ==
December 25, 1999

| Team 1 | Score | Team 2 |
|---|---|---|
| Zadar (Croatia) | 74–76 | (Federal Republic of Yugoslavia) Partizan |

== Final ==
December 25, 1999

| Team 1 | Score | Team 2 |
|---|---|---|
| Real Madrid Teka (Spain) | 77–78 | (Greece) Panathinaikos |

1999 XXXV FIBA International Christmas Tournament
"Trofeo Raimundo Saporta-Memorial Fernando Martín" Champions

Panathinaikos
1st title

== Final standings ==
| | Team |
|---|---|
| 1. | (Greece) Panathinaikos |
| 2. | (Spain) Real Madrid Teka |
| 3. | (Federal Republic of Yugoslavia) Partizan |
| 4. | (Croatia) Zadar |
