= 2003 XXXIX FIBA International Christmas Tournament =

2003 XXXIX FIBA International Christmas Tournament "Trofeo Raimundo Saporta-Memorial Fernando Martín"
- Sport: Basketball
- Finals champions: (Spain) Real Madrid
- Runners-up: (Turkey) Ülker

FIBA International Christmas Tournament seasons
- ← 2002 2004 →

The 2003 XXXIX FIBA International Christmas Tournament "Trofeo Raimundo Saporta-Memorial Fernando Martín" was the 39th edition of the FIBA International Christmas Tournament. It took place at Raimundo Saporta Pavilion, Madrid, Spain, on 25 December 2003 with the participations of Real Madrid and Ülker.

== Final ==
December 25, 2003

Team 1	Score	Team 2
Real Madrid (Spain)	86–78	(Turkey) Ülker

2003 XXXIX FIBA International Christmas Tournament
"Trofeo Raimundo Saporta-Memorial Fernando Martín" Champions

Real Madrid
24th title
