= 1994 XXX FIBA International Christmas Tournament =

1994 XXX FIBA International Christmas Tournament "Trofeo Raimundo Saporta-Memorial Fernando Martín"
- Sport: Basketball
- Finals champions: (Federal Republic of Yugoslavia) Yugoslavia
- Runners-up: (Spain) Real Madrid Teka

FIBA International Christmas Tournament seasons
- ← 1993 1995 →

The 1994 XXX FIBA International Christmas Tournament "Trofeo Raimundo Saporta-Memorial Fernando Martín" was the 30th edition of the FIBA International Christmas Tournament. It took place at Palacio de Deportes de la Comunidad de Madrid, Madrid, Spain, on 24, 25 and 26 December 1994 with the participations of Real Madrid Teka (champions of the 1993–94 Liga ACB), Yugoslavia, Moscow Selection and São Paulo All-Stars.

== League stage ==
Day 1, December 24, 1994

Team 1	Score	Team 2
Real Madrid Teka (Spain)	106–75	(Brazil) São Paulo All-Stars
Yugoslavia (Federal Republic of Yugoslavia)	80–73	(Russia) Moscow Selection

Day 2, December 25, 1994

Team 1	Score	Team 2
Real Madrid Teka (Spain)	77–75	(Russia) Moscow Selection
Yugoslavia (Federal Republic of Yugoslavia)	92–88	(Brazil) São Paulo All-Stars

Day 3, December 26, 1994

Team 1	Score	Team 2
Real Madrid Teka (Spain)	72–88	(Federal Republic of Yugoslavia) Yugoslavia
Moscow Selection (Russia)	104–100	(Brazil) São Paulo All-Stars

== Final standings ==
	Team	Pld	Pts	W	L	PF	PA
1.	(Federal Republic of Yugoslavia) Yugoslavia	3	6	3	0	260	233
2.	(Spain) Real Madrid Teka	3	5	2	1	255	238
3.	(Russia) Moscow Selection	3	4	1	2	252	257
4.	(Brazil) São Paulo All-Stars	3	3	0	3	263	302

1994 XXX FIBA International Christmas Tournament
"Trofeo Raimundo Saporta-Memorial Fernando Martín" Champions

Yugoslavia
2nd title
