= 2004 XXXX FIBA International Christmas Tournament =

2004 XXXX FIBA International Christmas Tournament "Trofeo Raimundo Saporta-Memorial Fernando Martín"
- Sport: Basketball
- Finals champions: (Spain) Real Madrid
- Runners-up: (Brazil) Telemar Rio de Janeiro

FIBA International Christmas Tournament seasons
- ← 2003 2006 →

The 2004 XXXX FIBA International Christmas Tournament "Trofeo Raimundo Saporta-Memorial Fernando Martín" was such written because the 40th edition (XLth in roman numbers and here XXXXth in old roman numbers perhaps more graphical), of the FIBA International Christmas Tournament, between a former XXXIXth one in 2003 and the following XXXXIst tournament in 2006. This one took place at Palacio Vistalegre, Madrid, Spain, on 25 December 2004 with the participations of Real Madrid and Telemar Rio de Janeiro.

== Final ==
December 25, 2004

Team 1	Score	Team 2
Real Madrid (Spain)	85–69	(Brazil) Telemar Rio de Janeiro

2004 XXXX FIBA International Christmas Tournament
"Trofeo Raimundo Saporta-Memorial Fernando Martín" Champions

Real Madrid
25th title
