= 1970 VI FIBA International Christmas Tournament =

1970 VI FIBA International Christmas Tournament "Trofeo Raimundo Saporta"
- Sport: Basketball
- Finals champions: (Spain) Real Madrid
- Runners-up: (Spain) Juventud Nerva

FIBA International Christmas Tournament seasons
- ← 1969 1971 →

The 1970 VI FIBA International Christmas Tournament "Trofeo Raimundo Saporta" was the 6th edition of the FIBA International Christmas Tournament. It took place at Sports City of Real Madrid Pavilion, Madrid, Spain, on 24, 25 and 26 December 1970 with the participations of Real Madrid (champions of the 1969–70 Liga Española de Baloncesto), Juventud Nerva, Gimnasia y Esgrima and Puerto Rico.

== League stage ==
Day 1, December 24, 1970

Team 1	Score	Team 2
Real Madrid (Spain)	83–64	(Argentina) Gimnasia y Esgrima
Juventud Nerva (Spain)	80–71	Puerto Rico

Day 2, December 25, 1970

Team 1	Score	Team 2
Real Madrid (Spain)	89–68	(Spain) Juventud Nerva
Gimnasia y Esgrima (Argentina)	87–82	Puerto Rico

Day 3, December 26, 1970

Team 1	Score	Team 2
Real Madrid (Spain)	89–80	Puerto Rico
Juventud Nerva (Spain)	78–76	(Argentina) Gimnasia y Esgrima

== Final standings ==
	Team	Pld	Pts	W	L	PF	PA
1.	(Spain) Real Madrid	3	6	3	0	261	212
2.	(Spain) Juventud Nerva	3	5	2	1	226	236
3.	(Argentina) Gimnasia y Esgrima	3	4	1	2	227	243
4.	Puerto Rico	3	3	0	3	233	256

1970 VI FIBA International Christmas Tournament
"Trofeo Raimundo Saporta" Champions

Real Madrid
4th title
