= 1995 XXXI FIBA International Christmas Tournament =

1995 XXXI FIBA International Christmas Tournament "Trofeo Raimundo Saporta-Memorial Fernando Martín"
- Sport: Basketball
- Finals champions: (Spain) Real Madrid Teka
- Runners-up: Australia

FIBA International Christmas Tournament seasons
- ← 1994 1996 →

The 1995 XXXI FIBA International Christmas Tournament "Trofeo Raimundo Saporta-Memorial Fernando Martín" was the 30th edition of the FIBA International Christmas Tournament. It took place at Palacio de Deportes de la Comunidad de Madrid, Madrid, Spain, on 24, 25 and 26 December 1995 with the participations of Real Madrid Teka (champions of the 1994–95 FIBA European League), Australia, Rio Claro and Cuba.

== League stage ==
Day 1, December 24, 1995

Team 1	Score	Team 2
Real Madrid Teka (Spain)	93–85	Cuba
Australia	80–75	(Brazil) Rio Claro

Day 2, December 25, 1995

Team 1	Score	Team 2
Real Madrid Teka (Spain)	92–82	Australia
Rio Claro (Brazil)	85–73	Cuba

Day 3, December 26, 1995

Team 1	Score	Team 2
Real Madrid Teka (Spain)	75–76	(Brazil) Rio Claro
Australia	95–70	Cuba

== Final standings ==
	Team	Pld	Pts	W	L	PF	PA
1.	(Spain) Real Madrid Teka	3	5	2	1	260	243
2.	Australia	3	5	2	1	257	237
3.	(Brazil) Rio Claro	3	5	2	1	236	228
4.	Cuba	3	3	0	3	228	273

1995 XXXI FIBA International Christmas Tournament
"Trofeo Raimundo Saporta-Memorial Fernando Martín" Champions

Real Madrid Teka
20th title
