= 2006 XXXXI FIBA International Christmas Tournament =

2006 XXXXI FIBA International Christmas Tournament "Trofeo Raimundo Saporta-Memorial Fernando Martín"
- Sport: Basketball
- Finals champions: (Spain) Real Madrid
- Runners-up: (Lithuania) Lietuvos rytas

FIBA International Christmas Tournament seasons
- ← 2004

The 2006 XXXXI FIBA International Christmas Tournament "Trofeo Raimundo Saporta-Memorial Fernando Martín" was the 41st edition of the FIBA International Christmas Tournament. It took place at Palacio Vistalegre, Madrid, Spain, on 25 December 2006 with the participations of Real Madrid and Lietuvos rytas.

== Final ==
December 25, 2006

Team 1	Score	Team 2
Real Madrid (Spain)	88–78	(Lithuania) Lietuvos rytas

2006 XXXXI FIBA International Christmas Tournament
"Trofeo Raimundo Saporta-Memorial Fernando Martín" Champions

Real Madrid
26th title
