= 1993 XXIX FIBA International Christmas Tournament =

1993 XXIX FIBA International Christmas Tournament "Trofeo Raimundo Saporta-Memorial Fernando Martín"
- Sport: Basketball
- Finals champions: Brazil All-Stars
- Runners-up: (Italy) Stefanel Trieste

FIBA International Christmas Tournament seasons
- ← 1992 1994 →

The 1993 XXIX FIBA International Christmas Tournament "Trofeo Raimundo Saporta-Memorial Fernando Martín" was the 29th edition of the FIBA International Christmas Tournament. It took place at Palacio de Deportes de la Comunidad de Madrid, Madrid, Spain, on 24, 25 and 26 December 1993 with the participations of Real Madrid Teka (champions of the 1992–93 Liga ACB), Brazil All-Stars, Stefanel Trieste and Estudiantes Argentaria (semifinalists of the 1992–93 Liga ACB).

== League stage ==
Day 1, December 24, 1993

Team 1	Score	Team 2
Real Madrid Teka (Spain)	111–108	Brazil All-Stars
Stefanel Trieste (Italy)	88–86	(Spain) Estudiantes Argentaria

Day 2, December 25, 1993

Team 1	Score	Team 2
Real Madrid Teka (Spain)	84–90	(Spain) Estudiantes Argentaria
Brazil All-Stars	87–76	(Italy) Stefanel Trieste

Day 3, December 26, 1993

Team 1	Score	Team 2
Real Madrid Teka (Spain)	86–96	(Italy) Stefanel Trieste
Brazil All-Stars	101–81	(Spain) Estudiantes Argentaria

== Final standings ==
	Team	Pld	Pts	W	L	PF	PA
1.	Brazil All-Stars	3	5	2	1	296	268
2.	(Italy) Stefanel Trieste	3	3	2	1	260	269
3.	(Spain) Real Madrid Teka	3	3	1	2	291	294
4.	(Spain) Estudiantes Argentaria	3	3	1	2	257	273

1993 XXIX FIBA International Christmas Tournament
"Trofeo Raimundo Saporta-Memorial Fernando Martín" Champions

Brazil All-Stars
1st title
