= 1976 XII FIBA International Christmas Tournament =

1976 XII FIBA International Christmas Tournament "Trofeo Raimundo Saporta"
- Sport: Basketball
- Finals champions: (Spain) Real Madrid
- Runners-up: (United States) Tennessee Volunteers

FIBA International Christmas Tournament seasons
- ← 1975 1977 →

The 1976 XII FIBA International Christmas Tournament "Trofeo Raimundo Saporta" was the 12th edition of the FIBA International Christmas Tournament. It took place at Sports City of Real Madrid Pavilion, Madrid, Spain, on 24, 25 and 26 December 1976 with the participations of Real Madrid (runners-up of the 1975–76 FIBA European Champions Cup), Tennessee Volunteers, Cavigal Nice and Africa Selection.

== League stage ==
Day 1, December 24, 1976

Team 1	Score	Team 2
Real Madrid (Spain)	96–82	(France) Cavigal Nice
Tennessee Volunteers (United States)	112–85	(United Nations) Africa Selection

Day 2, December 25, 1976

Team 1	Score	Team 2
Real Madrid (Spain)	98–62	(United Nations) Africa Selection
Tennessee Volunteers (United States)	98–75	(France) Cavigal Nice

Day 3, December 26, 1976

Team 1	Score	Team 2
Real Madrid (Spain)	113–103	(United States) Tennessee Volunteers
Cavigal Nice (France)	105–64	(United Nations) Africa Selection

== Final standings ==
	Team	Pld	Pts	W	L	PF	PA
1.	(Spain) Real Madrid	3	6	3	0	307	247
2.	(United States) Tennessee Volunteers	3	5	2	1	313	273
3.	(France) Cavigal Nice	3	4	1	2	262	258
4.	(United Nations) Africa Selection	3	3	0	3	211	315

1976 XII FIBA International Christmas Tournament
"Trofeo Raimundo Saporta" Champions

Real Madrid
9th title
