= 1973 IX FIBA International Christmas Tournament =

1973 IX FIBA International Christmas Tournament "Trofeo Raimundo Saporta"
- Sport: Basketball
- Finals champions: (Spain) Real Madrid
- Runners-up: Puerto Rico

FIBA International Christmas Tournament seasons
- ← 1972 1974 →

The 1973 IX FIBA International Christmas Tournament "Trofeo Raimundo Saporta" was the 9th edition of the FIBA International Christmas Tournament. It took place at Sports City of Real Madrid Pavilion, Madrid, Spain, on 24, 25 and 26 December 1973 with the participations of Real Madrid (champions of the 1972–73 Liga Española de Baloncesto), Puerto Rico, Juventud Schweppes (semifinalists of the 1972–73 FIBA European Cup Winners' Cup) and Obras Sanitarias.

== League stage ==
Day 1, December 24, 1973

Team 1	Score	Team 2
Real Madrid (Spain)	101–69	(Spain) Juventud Schweppes
Puerto Rico	91–72	(Argentina) Obras Sanitarias

Day 2, December 25, 1973

Team 1	Score	Team 2
Real Madrid (Spain)	109–80	(Argentina) Obras Sanitarias
Puerto Rico	89–87	(Spain) Juventud Schweppes

Day 3, December 26, 1973

Team 1	Score	Team 2
Real Madrid (Spain)	120–90	Puerto Rico
Juventud Schweppes (Spain)	77–72	(Argentina) Obras Sanitarias

== Final standings ==
	Team	Pld	Pts	W	L	PF	PA
1.	(Spain) Real Madrid	3	6	3	0	330	239
2.	Puerto Rico	3	5	2	1	270	279
3.	(Spain) Juventud Schweppes	3	4	1	2	233	262
4.	(Argentina) Obras Sanitarias	3	3	0	3	224	277

1973 IX FIBA International Christmas Tournament
"Trofeo Raimundo Saporta" Champions

Real Madrid
6th title
