= 1996 XXXII FIBA International Christmas Tournament =

1996 XXXII FIBA International Christmas Tournament "Trofeo Raimundo Saporta-Memorial Fernando Martín"
- Sport: Basketball
- Finals champions: (Spain) Real Madrid Teka
- Runners-up: (Greece) Olympiacos

FIBA International Christmas Tournament seasons
- ← 1995 1997 →

The 1996 XXXII FIBA International Christmas Tournament "Trofeo Raimundo Saporta-Memorial Fernando Martín" was the 32nd edition of the FIBA International Christmas Tournament. It took place at Palacio de Deportes de la Comunidad de Madrid, Madrid, Spain, on 24, 25 and 26 December 1996 with the participations of Real Madrid Teka, Olympiacos (champions of the 1995–96 Greek Basket League), Efes Pilsen (champions of the 1995–96 FIBA Korać Cup) and Scavolini Pesaro (ranked 7th in the 1995–96 Serie A1 FIP).

== League stage ==
Day 1, December 24, 1996

Team 1	Score	Team 2
Real Madrid Teka (Spain)	86–79	(Italy) Scavolini Pesaro
Olympiacos (Greece)	80–76	(Turkey) Efes Pilsen

Day 2, December 25, 1996

Team 1	Score	Team 2
Real Madrid Teka (Spain)	87–68	(Turkey) Efes Pilsen
Olympiacos (Greece)	85–62	(Italy) Scavolini Pesaro

Day 3, December 26, 1996

Team 1	Score	Team 2
Real Madrid Teka (Spain)	66–64	(Greece) Olympiacos
Efes Pilsen (Turkey)	87–66	(Italy) Scavolini Pesaro

== Final standings ==
	Team	Pld	Pts	W	L	PF	PA
1.	(Spain) Real Madrid Teka	3	6	3	0	239	211
2.	(Greece) Olympiacos	3	5	2	1	229	204
3.	(Turkey) Efes Pilsen	3	4	1	2	231	233
4.	(Italy) Scavolini Pesaro	3	3	0	3	207	258

1996 XXXII FIBA International Christmas Tournament
"Trofeo Raimundo Saporta-Memorial Fernando Martín" Champions

Real Madrid Teka
21st title
