= 1978 XIV FIBA International Christmas Tournament =

1978 XIV FIBA International Christmas Tournament "Trofeo Raimundo Saporta"
- Sport: Basketball
- Finals champions: (Spain) Real Madrid
- Runners-up: (Spain) Joventut Freixenet

FIBA International Christmas Tournament seasons
- ← 1977 1979 →

The 1978 XIV FIBA International Christmas Tournament "Trofeo Raimundo Saporta" was the 14th edition of the FIBA International Christmas Tournament. It took place at Sports City of Real Madrid Pavilion, Madrid, Spain, on 24, 25 and 26 December 1978 with the participations of Real Madrid (champions of the 1977–78 FIBA European Champions Cup), Joventut Freixenet (champions of the 1977–78 Liga Española de Baloncesto), Czechoslovakia and Obras Sanitarias.

== League stage ==
Day 1, December 24, 1978

Team 1	Score	Team 2
Real Madrid (Spain)	107–101	(Spain) Joventut Freixenet
Czechoslovakia	90–88	(Argentina) Obras Sanitarias

Day 2, December 25, 1978

Team 1	Score	Team 2
Real Madrid (Spain)	117–90	(Argentina) Obras Sanitarias
Joventut Freixenet (Spain)	93–80	Czechoslovakia

Day 3, December 26, 1978

Team 1	Score	Team 2
Real Madrid (Spain)	118–105	Czechoslovakia
Joventut Freixenet (Spain)	86–81	(Argentina) Obras Sanitarias

== Final standings ==
	Team	Pld	Pts	W	L	PF	PA
1.	(Spain) Real Madrid	3	6	3	0	342	296
2.	(Spain) Joventut Freixenet	3	5	2	1	280	268
3.	Czechoslovakia	3	4	1	2	275	299
4.	(Argentina) Obras Sanitarias	3	3	0	3	259	293

1978 XIV FIBA International Christmas Tournament
"Trofeo Raimundo Saporta" Champions

Real Madrid
11th title
