= 1997 XXXIII FIBA International Christmas Tournament =

1997 XXXIII FIBA International Christmas Tournament "Trofeo Raimundo Saporta-Memorial Fernando Martín"
- Sport: Basketball
- Finals champions: (Spain) Real Madrid Teka
- Runners-up: Italy

FIBA International Christmas Tournament seasons
- ← 1996 1998 →

The 1997 XXXIII FIBA International Christmas Tournament "Trofeo Raimundo Saporta-Memorial Fernando Martín" was the 33nd edition of the FIBA International Christmas Tournament. It took place at Palacio de Deportes de la Comunidad de Madrid, Madrid, Spain, on 24, 25 and 26 December 1997 with the participations of Real Madrid Teka (champions of the 1996–97 FIBA EuroCup), Brazil, Italy and New Zealand.

== League stage ==
Day 1, December 24, 1997

Team 1	Score	Team 2
Real Madrid Teka (Spain)	71–64	Italy
Brazil	90–66	New Zealand

Day 2, December 25, 1997

Team 1	Score	Team 2
Real Madrid Teka (Spain)	91–49	New Zealand
Brazil	80–86	Italy

Day 3, December 26, 1997

Team 1	Score	Team 2
Real Madrid Teka (Spain)	77–76	Brazil
Italy	70–56	New Zealand

== Final standings ==
	Team	Pld	Pts	W	L	PF	PA
1.	(Spain) Real Madrid Teka	3	6	3	0	239	189
2.	Italy	3	5	2	1	220	207
3.	Brazil	3	4	1	2	246	229
4.	New Zealand	3	3	0	3	171	251

1997 XXXIII FIBA International Christmas Tournament
"Trofeo Raimundo Saporta-Memorial Fernando Martín" Champions

Real Madrid Teka
22nd title
