= 1977 XIII FIBA International Christmas Tournament =

1977 XIII FIBA International Christmas Tournament "Trofeo Raimundo Saporta"
- Sport: Basketball
- Finals champions: (Spain) Real Madrid
- Runners-up: Australia

FIBA International Christmas Tournament seasons
- ← 1976 1978 →

The 1977 XIII FIBA International Christmas Tournament "Trofeo Raimundo Saporta" was the 13th edition of the FIBA International Christmas Tournament. It took place at Sports City of Real Madrid Pavilion, Madrid, Spain, on 24, 25 and 26 December 1977 with the participations of Real Madrid (champions of the 1976–77 Liga Española de Baloncesto), Australia, Defensor Sporting and Bradley Braves.

== League stage ==
Day 1, December 24, 1977

Team 1	Score	Team 2
Real Madrid (Spain)	120–109	(Uruguay) Defensor Sporting
Australia	94–69	(United States) Bradley Braves

Day 2, December 25, 1977

Team 1	Score	Team 2
Real Madrid (Spain)	116–64	Australia
Defensor Sporting (Uruguay)	104–114	(United States) Bradley Braves

Day 3, December 26, 1977

Team 1	Score	Team 2
Real Madrid (Spain)	138–87	(United States) Bradley Braves
Australia	78–87	(Uruguay) Defensor Sporting

== Final standings ==
	Team	Pld	Pts	W	L	PF	PA
1.	(Spain) Real Madrid	3	6	3	0	374	260
2.	Australia	3	4	1	2	236	272
3.	(Uruguay) Defensor Sporting	3	4	1	2	300	312
4.	(United States) Bradley Braves	3	4	1	2	270	336

1977 XIII FIBA International Christmas Tournament
"Trofeo Raimundo Saporta" Champions

Real Madrid
10th title
