= 1974 X FIBA International Christmas Tournament =

1974 X FIBA International Christmas Tournament "Trofeo Raimundo Saporta"
- Sport: Basketball
- Finals champions: (Spain) Real Madrid
- Runners-up: (United States) North Carolina Tar Heels

FIBA International Christmas Tournament seasons
- ← 1973 1975 →

The 1974 X FIBA International Christmas Tournament "Trofeo Raimundo Saporta" was the 10th edition of the FIBA International Christmas Tournament. It took place at Sports City of Real Madrid Pavilion, Madrid, Spain, on 24, 25 and 26 December 1974 with the participations of Real Madrid (champions of the 1973–74 FIBA European Champions Cup), North Carolina Tar Heels, Cuba (semifinalists of the 1974 FIBA World Championship) and Estudiantes Monteverde (semifinalists of the 1973–74 FIBA European Cup Winners' Cup).

== League stage ==
Day 1, December 24, 1974

Team 1	Score	Team 2
Real Madrid (Spain)	100–76	Cuba
North Carolina Tar Heels (United States)	109–82	(Spain) Estudiantes Monteverde

Day 2, December 25, 1974

Team 1	Score	Team 2
Real Madrid (Spain)	96–71	(Spain) Estudiantes Monteverde
North Carolina Tar Heels (United States)	87–86	Cuba

Day 3, December 26, 1974

Team 1	Score	Team 2
Real Madrid (Spain)	112–101	(United States) North Carolina Tar Heels
Cuba	96–75	(Spain) Estudiantes Monteverde

== Final standings ==
	Team	Pld	Pts	W	L	PF	PA
1.	(Spain) Real Madrid	3	6	3	0	308	248
2.	(United States) North Carolina Tar Heels	3	5	2	1	297	280
3.	Cuba	3	4	1	2	258	262
4.	(Spain) Estudiantes Monteverde	3	3	0	3	228	301

1974 X FIBA International Christmas Tournament
"Trofeo Raimundo Saporta" Champions

Real Madrid
7th title
