= 1975 XI FIBA International Christmas Tournament =

1975 XI FIBA International Christmas Tournament "Trofeo Raimundo Saporta"
- Sport: Basketball
- Finals champions: (Spain) Real Madrid
- Runners-up: (Brazil) Palmeiras

FIBA International Christmas Tournament seasons
- ← 1974 1976 →

The 1975 XI FIBA International Christmas Tournament "Trofeo Raimundo Saporta" was the 11th edition of the FIBA International Christmas Tournament. It took place at Sports City of Real Madrid Pavilion, Madrid, Spain, on 24, 25 and 26 December 1975 with the participations of Real Madrid (runners-up of the 1974–75 FIBA European Champions Cup), Palmeiras, Arizona State Sun Devils and Estudiantes Monteverde.

== League stage ==
Day 1, December 24, 1975

Team 1	Score	Team 2
Real Madrid (Spain)	120–95	(United States) Arizona State Sun Devils
Estudiantes Monteverde (Spain)	78–87	(Brazil) Palmeiras

Day 2, December 25, 1975

Team 1	Score	Team 2
Real Madrid (Spain)	99–65	(Spain) Estudiantes Monteverde
Arizona State Sun Devils (United States)	84–92	(Brazil) Palmeiras

Day 3, December 26, 1975

Team 1	Score	Team 2
Real Madrid (Spain)	117–100	(Brazil) Palmeiras
Arizona State Sun Devils (United States)	94–83	(Spain) Estudiantes Monteverde

== Final standings ==
	Team	Pld	Pts	W	L	PF	PA
1.	(Spain) Real Madrid	3	6	3	0	336	260
2.	(Brazil) Palmeiras	3	5	2	1	279	279
3.	(United States) Arizona State Sun Devils	3	4	1	2	273	295
4.	(Spain) Estudiantes Monteverde	3	3	0	3	226	280

1975 XI FIBA International Christmas Tournament
"Trofeo Raimundo Saporta" Champions

Real Madrid
8th title
