= FIBA International Christmas Tournament =

- Sport: Basketball
- Founded: 1966
- First season: 1966
- Folded: 2006
- No. of teams: 4
- Country: FIBA members
- Continent: Europe
- Last champions: (Spain) Real Madrid (26th title)
- Most titles: (Spain) Real Madrid (26 titles)

FIBA International Christmas Tournament also known as the Christmas Tournament (Torneo de Navidad) was a men's basketball international friendly competition at the club level (and in some editions with national teams), organized by FIBA at its first decades through the Commission of International Organizations under the hand of Raimundo Saporta, club director and president of the International Commission of the International Basketball Federation (FIBA), and with the authorization and support of R. William Jones, its general secretary, so it had the officiality of FIBA in its first decades of life, being also the starting point of the FIBA Intercontinental Cup, whose first edition appears in the history of this competition. After 1980, the tournament transitioned to being an festive exhibition, although it still garnered attention and popularity.

== History ==
The competition was held for the first time in January 1966 with the name of FIBA Intercontinental Cup on the occasion of the inauguration of the new basketball venue of Real Madrid, the Pabellón de la Ciudad Deportiva (later called the "Raimundo Saporta Pavilion"). This edition also served as the starting point of the FIBA Intercontinental Cup (later known as the FIBA Club World Cup), whose results were valid for the first edition of the aforementioned competition of the highest basketball organism, and whose first trophy It was the same as the one used in the FIBA International Christmas Tournament until 1980.

The second edition of the Christmas Tournament was baptized at the time as Latin Cup, due to the origin of the participating teams (there was a competition called Latin Cup in 1953 that only had an edition, although the one of December 1966 counts as the second edition of the Christmas Tournament), and it was not until the third edition, in 1967, when the tournament was renamed by the popular and better-known FIBA International Tournament Christmas – Torneo de Navidad – (also known as the "Trophy Raimundo Saporta", and later "Memorial Fernando Martín", together with the denomination of Christmas Tournament, as well as "Philips Trophy" from its beginnings and El Corte Inglés from 1981 until the end of the 80s). That is, FIBA organized, Philips put the money and Real Madrid yielded the field, with the approval and consent of the FEB. As of 1981, Real Madrid, with the sponsorship of the English Court (until 1989, subsequently replacing other sponsors), managed the tournament, although their relations with FIBA continued.

Despite the tournament's perceived importance at the time, it is considered nowadays a friendly competition, although the prestige of the twelve silver medals of the winner for the contenders was maximum, since until 1980 it had the official status and the protection of FIBA. However, the first edition of the International Christmas Tournament made the FIBA Intercontinental Basketball Cup officially emerge, a competition that "merengues" would go on to win four times.

It could be said that the International Christmas Tournament, while it was under the auspices and organization of the FIBA (1966–1980), had a rank of para-official competition, that is, that it had an official rank or character (although it was not considered like this at present), but it worked as such at that time. For what was an international friendly competition of an official nature. Although from 1981 it was managed by Real Madrid, the Committee of International Activities of FIBA was behind it. In fact it was the starting point of the FIBA Intercontinental Cup, and whose second edition of this tournament (called Copa Latina in that edition), already breaking away from the Intercontinental, continued under the organization and official FIBA in everything concerning the delivery of trophies and the FIBA emblem on the podium, as well as FIBA referees, but the fact that its last decades were largely managed by Real Madrid, because it gave the competition, for all intents and purposes, a friendly character, despite its weight, importance and notoriety, but above all due to the fact that its participants acceded by invitation (although in the FIBA Club World Cup as well). In short, the officiality of FIBA was languishing as of 1980 (despite the fact that FIBA and its committee were still behind the event, as attested by the presence, year after year, of FIBA referees) and redefining itself in a friendly tournament (from 1980), although of great prestige for all tale meant and the international character of it.

== Results ==
The competition featured three different trophy models throughout its history. The first gold and granted by FIBA until 1980, the second granted by Real Madrid together with its sponsor El Corte Inglés during the time that the sponsorship lasted (1981-1989), and the third trophy model that granted Real Madrid during his last decades.

Year	Champions	Second place	Third place	Fourth place	Results / Notes
1966; Details	(Italy); Ignis Varese	(Brazil); Corinthians	(Spain); Real Madrid	(United States); Chicago Jamaco Saints	Final: 66–59; 3rd place game: 112–96
1966; Details	(Italy); Simmenthal Milano	(Spain); Real Madrid	(France); ASVEL	(Portugal); Benfica	Four team league stage.
1967; Details	(Spain); Real Madrid	(Spain); Juventud Kalso	(Australia); Victoria Melbourne	(Argentina); River Plate	Four team league stage.
1968; Details	(Spain); Real Madrid	Uruguay	(Philippines); Meralco Reddy Kilowatts	(Spain); Picadero	Four team league stage.
1969; Details	(Spain); Real Madrid	Panama	(Argentina); Buenos Aires Selection	(Spain); Juventud Nerva	Four team league stage.
1970; Details	(Spain); Real Madrid	(Spain); Juventud Nerva	(Argentina); Gimnasia y Esgrima	Puerto Rico	Four team league stage.
1971; Details	(United States); North Carolina Tar Heels	(Spain); Real Madrid	(Spain); Juventud Schweppes	(Chile); Unión Española	Four team league stage.
1972; Details	(Spain); Real Madrid	(Brazil); Palmeiras	(United States); Virginia Cavaliers	(Spain); Estudiantes Monteverde	Four team league stage.
1973; Details	(Spain); Real Madrid	Puerto Rico	(Spain); Juventud Schweppes	(Argentina); Obras Sanitarias	Four team league stage.
1974; Details	(Spain); Real Madrid	(United States); North Carolina Tar Heels	Cuba	(Spain); Estudiantes Monteverde	Four team league stage.
1975; Details	(Spain); Real Madrid	(Brazil); Palmeiras	(United States); Arizona State Sun Devils	(Spain); Estudiantes Monteverde	Four team league stage.
1976; Details	(Spain); Real Madrid	(United States); Tennessee Volunteers	(France); Cavigal Nice	(United Nations); Africa Selection	Four team league stage.
1977; Details	(Spain); Real Madrid	Australia	(Uruguay); Defensor Sporting	(United States); Bradley Braves	Four team league stage.
1978; Details	(Spain); Real Madrid	(Spain); Joventut Freixenet	Czechoslovakia	(Argentina); Obras Sanitarias	Four team league stage.
1979; Details	Soviet Union	(Spain); Real Madrid	(United States); Athletes in Action	(Spain); Joventut Freixenet	Four team league stage.
1980; Details	(Spain); Real Madrid	(Spain); Cotonificio	(Brazil); Sírio	(Socialist Federal Republic of Yugoslavia); Partizan	Four team league stage.
1981; Details	(Spain); Real Madrid	(United States); Marlboro All-Stars	(Spain); Inmobanco	Israel	Four team league stage.
1982; Details	(Spain); Inmobanco	(Spain); Real Madrid	(United States); Marlboro All-Stars	(Brazil); São José	Four team league stage.
1983; Details	Soviet Union	(Spain); Real Madrid	(United States); New York All-Stars	Cuba	Four team league stage.
1984; Details	Soviet Union	(Spain); Real Madrid	(United States); Cheiw All-Stars	(Socialist Federal Republic of Yugoslavia); Yugoslavia	Four team league stage.
1985; Details	(Spain); Real Madrid	(Socialist Federal Republic of Yugoslavia); Yugoslavia	(Brazil); Monte Líbano	(United States); Golden State All-Stars	Four team league stage.
1986; Details	(Spain); Real Madrid	(Socialist Federal Republic of Yugoslavia); Yugoslavia	Brazil	(United States); Winston All-Stars	Four team league stage.
1987; Details	(Spain); Real Madrid	Soviet Union	Greece	Argentina	Four team league stage.
1988; Details	(Socialist Federal Republic of Yugoslavia); Yugoslavia	(Spain); Real Madrid	Soviet Union	(Brazil); Monte Líbano	Four team league stage.
1989; Details	(Socialist Federal Republic of Yugoslavia); Jugoplastika	(Spain); Real Madrid	(Greece); Aris	(Israel); Maccabi Elite Tel Aviv	Four team league stage.
1990; Details	(Spain); Real Madrid Otaysa	(Socialist Federal Republic of Yugoslavia); POP 84	(Israel); Maccabi Elite Tel Aviv	(France); Limoges CSP	Four team league stage.
1991; Details	(Spain); Real Madrid Asegurator	(Israel); Maccabi Elite Tel Aviv	Australia	(Italy); Benetton Treviso	Four team league stage.
1992; Details	(Spain); Real Madrid Teka	(Spain); Estudiantes Argentaria	(Croatia); Cibona	(Israel); Maccabi Elite Tel Aviv	Four team league stage.
1993; Details	Brazil All-Stars	(Italy); Stefanel Trieste	(Spain); Real Madrid Teka	(Spain); Estudiantes Argentaria	Four team league stage.
1994; Details	(Federal Republic of Yugoslavia); Yugoslavia	(Spain); Real Madrid Teka	(Russia); Moscow Selection	(Brazil); São Paulo All-Stars	Four team league stage.
1995; Details	(Spain); Real Madrid Teka	Australia	(Brazil); Rio Claro	Cuba	Four team league stage.
1996; Details	(Spain); Real Madrid Teka	(Greece); Olympiacos	(Turkey); Efes Pilsen	(Italy); Scavolini Pesaro	Four team league stage.
1997; Details	(Spain); Real Madrid Teka	Italy	Brazil	(New Zealand); Nea Zealand	Four team league stage.
1998; Details	(Russia); CSKA Moscow	(Spain); Real Madrid Teka	(Federal Republic of Yugoslavia); Partizan	(Slovenia); Union Olimpija	Final: 84–77; 3rd place game: 66–62
1999; Details	(Greece); Panathinaikos	(Spain); Real Madrid Teka	(Federal Republic of Yugoslavia); Partizan	(Croatia); Zadar	Final: 78–77; 3rd place game: 76–74
2000; Details	(Spain); Real Madrid Teka	(Brazil); São Paulo All-Stars	N/A	N/A	Final: 111–83
2001; Details	(Russia); Ural Great Perm	(Spain); Real Madrid	N/A	N/A	Final: 80–69
2002; Details	(Israel); Maccabi Elite Tel Aviv	(Spain); Real Madrid	N/A	N/A	Final: 87–71
2003; Details	(Spain); Real Madrid	(Turkey); Ülker	N/A	N/A	Final: 86–78
2004; Details	(Spain); Real Madrid	(Brazil); Telemar Rio de Janeiro	N/A	N/A	Final: 85–69
2006; Details	(Spain); Real Madrid	(Lithuania); Lietuvos rytas	N/A	N/A	Final: 88–78

== Medals (1966-2006) ==
Rank	Nation	Gold	Silver	Bronze	Total
1	Spain (ESP)	27	18	5	50
2	Russia (RUS)	5	1	2	8
3	Serbia (SRB)	3	3	2	8
4	Italy (ITA)	2	2	0	4
5	Brazil (BRA)	1	6	5	12
6	United States (USA)	1	3	6	10
7	Greece (GRE)	1	1	2	4
8	Israel (ISR)	1	1	1	3
9	Australia (AUS)	0	1	2	3
10	Turkey (TUR)	0	1	1	2
10	Uruguay (URU)	0	1	1	2
12	Lithuania (LTU)	0	1	0	1
12	Panama (PAN)	0	1	0	1
12	Puerto Rico (PUR)	0	1	0	1
15	Argentina (ARG)	0	0	2	2
15	France (FRA)	0	0	2	2
17	Croatia (CRO)	0	0	1	1
17	Cuba (CUB)	0	0	1	1
17	Czech Republic (CZE)	0	0	1	1
17	Philippines (PHI)	0	0	1	1
Totals (20 entries)		41	41	35	117

1. Russia + Soviet Union
2. Serbia + Yugoslavia
3. Czech Republic + Czechoslovakia
