= 1971–72 Liga Española de Baloncesto =

Liga Española de Baloncesto
- Season: 1971–72
- Games played: 132
- Teams: 12
- TV partner: TVE

Finals
- Champions: Real Madrid (14th title)
- Runners-up: Barcelona

Statistical leaders
- Points: Gonzalo Sagi-Vela

Records
- Biggest home win: Barcelona 84–29 Breogán (21 November 1971); Real Madrid 108–53 Náutico (2 January 1972)
- Biggest away win: Breogán 42–89 Real Madrid (28 November 1971)
- Highest scoring: Madrid 133–85 Vallehermoso (18 December 1971)
- Winning streak: 17 games Real Madrid
- Losing streak: 15 games Vallehermoso

The 1971–72 Liga Española de Baloncesto season was the 16th season of the Liga Española de Baloncesto and was played between 9 October 1971 and 27 February 1972. The season ended with Real Madrid winning their 14th title.

== Overview before the season ==
12 teams joined the league, including two promoted from the 1970–71 Segunda División.

Promoted from 1970 to 1971 Segunda División

- Vallehermoso
- Pineda

== Teams and locations ==
Location of teams in 1971–72 Liga Española de Baloncesto
Location of teams in 1971–72 Liga Española de Baloncesto (Canary Islands)

Team	Home city
Barcelona	Barcelona
Breogán Fontecelta	Lugo
Estudiantes Monteverde	Madrid
Juventud Schweppes	Badalona
Kas	Bilbao
Manresa La Casera	Manresa
Náutico	Santa Cruz de Tenerife
Picadero Damm	Barcelona
Pineda	Pineda de Mar
Real Madrid	Madrid
San José Irpen Rovilux	Badalona
Vallehermoso	Madrid

== Regular season ==
=== League table ===
Pos	Team	Pld	W	D	L	PF	PA	PD	Pts	Qualification or relegation
1	Real Madrid (C)	22	21	0	1	2115	1455	+660	42	Qualification to FIBA European Champions Cup
2	Barcelona	22	19	0	3	1814	1469	+345	38	Qualification to FIBA Korać Cup
3	Juventud Schweppes	22	17	0	5	1778	1393	+385	34	Qualification to FIBA European Cup Winners' Cup
4	Picadero Damm	22	13	0	9	1531	1591	−60	26	Qualification to FIBA Korać Cup
5	Estudiantes Monteverde	22	12	0	10	1686	1560	+126	24	
6	Kas	22	11	0	11	1741	1675	+66	22	
7	San José Irpen Rovilux	22	9	2	11	1429	1613	−184	20	
8	Manresa La Casera	22	9	0	13	1713	1736	−23	18	
9	Náutico	22	7	0	15	1392	1629	−237	14	
10	Pineda (O)	22	5	1	16	1382	1605	−223	11	Relegation playoffs
11	Breogán Fontecelta (O)	22	4	1	17	1229	1652	−423	9	Relegation playoffs
12	Vallehermoso (O)	22	3	0	19	1513	1945	−432	6	Relegation playoffs

Source: Linguasport
(C) Champions; (O) Play-off winners

== Relegation playoffs ==
Team 1	Agg.	Team 2	1st leg	2nd leg
Pineda	178–92	Universidad Canarias	99–41	79–51
L'Hospitalet	97–99	Breogán Fontecelta	47–51	50–48
Vallehermoso	122–119	Real Canoe	58–51	64–68

== Statistics leaders ==
=== Points ===
Rank	Name	Team	Points
1	(Spain) Gonzalo Sagi-Vela	Estudiantes Monteverde	475
2	(Spain) Juan Martínez	Manresa Kan's	437
3	(Spain) Víctor Escorial	Picadero Damm	415
4	(Spain) Clifford Luyk	Real Madrid	413
5	(Spain) Juan Colell	Manresa Kan's	368
