= Raimundo Saporta Pavilion =

Indoor arena in Madrid, Spain

Coordinates: 40.479218°N 3.687662°W

- El Pabellón
- Interactive map of Raimundo Saporta Pavilion
- Former names: Pabellón de la Ciudad Deportiva del Real Madrid (1966–1999)
- Location: Paseo de la Castellana 259, Madrid 28046
- Owner: Real Madrid
- Operator: Real Madrid Baloncesto
- Capacity: 5,200 (basketball)
- Surface: Parquet Floor

Construction
- Opened: 6 January 1966
- Closed: 2004
- Demolished: August 2004

Tenants
- Real Madrid (ACB) (1966–1986), (1998–2004)

Raimundo Saporta Pavilion (originally known as Pabellón de la Ciudad Deportiva del Real Madrid) was an indoor arena located in Madrid, Spain. It was used particularly for basketball matches of Real Madrid. Until 1999, it was known as the Pabellón de la Ciudad Deportiva del Real Madrid, when it was renamed in honor of the former president of Real Madrid's basketball team, the late Raimundo Saporta.

The arena was demolished in 2004.

== Early history ==
The arena was inaugurated on 6 January 1966 for the annual intercontinental Philips trophy (later renamed annual Christmas tournament), in which Ignis Varese defeated local Real Madrid, the Jarnaco Saints of Chicago and the Brazilian Corinthians. A year after its inauguration, on 1 April 1967, The arena saw the home team Real defeat Simmenthal Milano to claim its third European Champions cup title after a 93–91 victory. During the 21 consecutive years that Real played on the field of the old pavilion it would conquer 5 European Champions titles, 4 Intercontinental cups, 17 League Championships, 10 Cup titles, 1 Supercopa of Spain, 2 Matches of the Community of Madrid and 16 Matches of Christmas. The second in three straight Intercontinental cup wins was achieved by the home team on the Pavilion floor in 1977. The tremendous successes in that period of time made the 5,000 seat arena too small for a team of that magnitude, and in 1987 the team moved its home matches to the Palace of Sports of the Madrid Community located in the Goya Street of Madrid.

== Recent years ==
Soon after Real decided to return and host its home matches in the arena in the start of the 1998–99 season, the arena was renovated at a cost of roughly 350 million pesetas and reopened on 4 February 1999 and was also renamed Raimundo Saporta Pavilion in honor of the club director who had died in February 1997. The pavilion had increased seating capacity of 5,200 seats.

The bad economic situation of the club forced club president Florentino Pérez to sell the lands on which the Ciudad Deportiva was located for an estimated 188 million euros in November 2001. The demolition of the arena took place in August 2004, and Real Madrid moved its home games to Palacio Vistalegre.

== Demolition and current development ==
The former site of the Sports city and the Raimundo Saporta Pavilion is now used for the Four Towers Business Area, an important business park.

== Notes ==
Preceded by Fiesta Alegre fronton Palacio de Deportes de la CAM	Home of Real Madrid; 1966–1987; 1999–2004	Succeeded by Palacio de Deportes de la CAM; Palacio Vistalegre
Preceded by Ginásio Poliesportivo Parque São Jorge; São Paulo	FIBA Intercontinental Cup; Final Venue; 1966	Succeeded by Palazzo dello Sport; Rome
Preceded by Palazzetto dello sport Bologna	FIBA European Champions Cup; Final Four Venue; 1967	Succeeded by Palais des Sports de Gerland; Lyon
Preceded by Luna Park; Buenos Aires	FIBA Intercontinental Cup; Final Venue; 1977	Succeeded by Estadio Obras Sanitarias; Buenos Aires
