= Königsfeld =

Königsfeld may refer to several places:

In Germany:

- Königsfeld, Mecklenburg-Vorpommern in the Nordwestmecklenburg district in Mecklenburg-Vorpommern
- Königsfeld, Saxony in the Mittweida district in Saxony
- Königsfeld, Rhineland-Palatinate in Brohltal, Ahrweiler in Rhineland-Palatinate
- Königsfeld, Bavaria in the district of Bamberg in Bavaria
- Königsfeld im Schwarzwald in Schwarzwald-Baar-Kreis in Baden-Württemberg
- Ennepetal-Königsfeld, a borough of Ennepetal

In the Czech Republic:

- Anenská Studánka, in Ústí nad Orlicí District (Bohemia)
- Brno-Královo Pole, in Brno-City District (Moravia)

In Ukraine:

- German name of Ust-Chorna (Усть-Чорна) oblast Transkarpatien, rajon Tjatschiw
