= 1963–64 FIBA European Champions Cup =

- League: FIBA European Champions Cup
- Sport: Basketball

Finals
- Champions: (Spain) Real Madrid (1st title)
- Runners-up: (Czechoslovakia) Spartak ZJŠ Brno

FIBA European Champions Cup seasons
- ← 1962–63 1964–65 →

The 1963–64 FIBA European Champions Cup was the seventh season of the European top-tier level professional basketball club competition FIBA European Champions Cup (now called EuroLeague). It was won by Real Madrid, marking the first of the club's 10 EuroLeague championships in its history.

Real defeated Spartak ZJŠ Brno in the two-legged EuroLeague Final, after losing the first game in Brno, 110–99, and winning the second game at Madrid, 84–64.

== Competition system ==
23 teams. European national domestic league champions, plus the then current FIBA European Champions Cup title holders only, playing in a tournament system. The Finals were a two-game home-and-away aggregate.

== First round ==
Team 1	Agg.	Team 2	1st leg	2nd leg
Wiener (Austria)	133–184	(Czechoslovakia) Spartak ZJŠ Brno	71–105	62–79
AEK (Greece)	141–154	(Turkey) Galatasaray	73–66	68–88
Stade Francais Geneva (Switzerland)	119–161	(East Germany) Chemie Halle	59–72	60–89
Alvik (Sweden)	147–173	(Poland) Legia Warsaw	80–98	67–75
Belfast Celtics (Northern Ireland)	119–209	(Spain) Real Madrid	73–102	46–107
Etzella (Luxembourg)	114–145	(France) PUC	57–73	57–72
Academic (Bulgaria)	141–149	(Socialist Federal Republic of Yugoslavia) OKK Beograd	61–68	80–81
Alliance Casablanca (Morocco)	116–177	(Belgium) Antwerpse	54–73	62–104

== Second round ==
Team 1	Agg.	Team 2	1st leg	2nd leg
Helsingin Kisa-Toverit (Finland)	139–129	(East Germany) Chemie Halle	75–64	64–65
Antwerpse (Belgium)	170–180	(Italy) Simmenthal Milano	84–90	86–90
Galatasaray (Turkey)	131–131*	(Romania) Steaua București	69–51	62–80
Benfica (Portugal)	0–4**	(Poland) Legia Warsaw	0–2	0–2
Alemannia Aachen (West Germany)	112–208	(Spain) Real Madrid	69–93	43–115
PUC (France)	63–105***	(Socialist Federal Republic of Yugoslavia) OKK Beograd	63–105	
Maccabi Tel Aviv (Israel)	111–154	(Czechoslovakia) Spartak ZJŠ Brno	60–58	51–96

*Since the aggregate score after the two legs was tied, a tie-break was played in București on 19 January 1964: Steaua București – Galatasaray 57–56.

**Benfica withdrew before the first leg and Legia Warsaw received a forfeit (2–0) in both games.

***PUC could not travel to Belgrade to play the first leg after all fights to the Yugoslavian capital were cancelled due to adverse weather. Later, FIBA decided that this tie should be played as a single game in Paris (16 January 1964).

Automatically qualified to the quarterfinals

- (Soviet Union) CSKA Moscow (title holder) withdrew before the competition. The "official" explanation given by the Soviet Basketball Federation was to prepare the Olympic Games.

== Quarterfinals ==
Team 1	Agg.	Team 2	1st leg	2nd leg
Steaua București (Romania)	169–196	(Czechoslovakia) Spartak ZJŠ Brno	94–92	75–104
Simmenthal Milano (Italy)	186–167	(Finland) Helsingin Kisa-Toverit	99–70	87–97
Legia Warsaw (Poland)	176–194	(Spain) Real Madrid	90–102	86–92

Automatically qualified to the semifinals

- (Socialist Federal Republic of Yugoslavia) OKK Beograd

== Semifinals ==
Team 1	Agg.	Team 2	1st leg	2nd leg
OKK Beograd (Socialist Federal Republic of Yugoslavia)	178–179	(Czechoslovakia) Spartak ZJŠ Brno	103–94	75–85
Simmenthal Milano (Italy)	160–178	(Spain) Real Madrid	82–77	78–101

== Finals ==
Team 1	Agg.	Team 2	1st leg	2nd leg
Spartak ZJŠ Brno (Czechoslovakia)	174–183	(Spain) Real Madrid	110–99	64–84

First leg Brno Ice rink, Brno;Attendance 11,207, also mentioned as 12,000 or 14,000 (27 April 1964)
Second leg Frontón Vista Alegre, Madrid;Attendance 2,500 (10 May 1964)

1963–64 FIBA European Champions Cup
Champions

Real Madrid
1st Title

== Awards ==
=== FIBA European Champions Cup Finals Top Scorer ===
- (Spain) Emiliano Rodríguez ( (Spain) Real Madrid)
