= 1932–33 Akron Goodyear Wingfoots season =

NPBL professional basketball team season

- League: National Professional Basketball League
- Head coach: Smiley Weltner
- Owner(s): Goodyear
- Arena: Goodyear Hall

Results
- Record: 2–4 (.333)
- Place: Division: 4th
- Playoff finish: Did not qualify

The 1932–33 Akron Goodyear Wingfoots season was the Goodyear Wingfoots' only season in the National Professional Basketball League (NPBL), a short-lived professional basketball league of sorts that could be seen as the precursor of both the Midwest Basketball Conference (MBC) and the National Basketball League (NBL), with the latter league eventually merging operations in 1949 with the younger, rivaling Basketball Association of America (BAA) to become the National Basketball Association (NBA). However, if you include their previous seasons of existence as an independent team, alongside seasons where they competed in the Amateur Athletic Union and the National Industrial League (not to be confused with the National Industrial Basketball League that they would later compete in, with the Goodyear Wingfoots winning a championship in the NIL during the previous season in 1932), this season would officially be considered their 15th season of play as a team. Entering this season, the Goodyear Wingfoots would join the inner city rivaling Akron Firestone Non-Skids operated by head coach Paul Sheeks and the Indianapolis Kautskys team that was owned by Frank Kautsky as three of the nine incoming teams to create that new league (with two of the teams presumably being former American Basketball League under rebranded names in the Fort Wayne Chiefs and the Toledo Crimson Coaches Tobaccos). (Interestingly, Goodyear's team was considered one-half of the Akron, Ohio representatives that were interested in joining this league at a time when the initial final attempt for creating the NPBL for this season had representatives in Fort Wayne, Indiana within that state's Anthony Wayne Hotel being joined by representatives in Chicago, Illinois and other Ohio locations beyond just their home area with Canton, Cleveland, Dayton, and Toledo meeting at the time for an eight-team league before eventually deciding to be a combined Indiana-Ohio nine-team league there.) Unfortunately for the rest of the league, four of the teams created would end up folding operations throughout the season for one reason or another, with the Goodyear Wingfoots themselves playing in only six games this year. Worse yet for the Goodyear squad, they would finish the season with a below-average 2–4 record for a technical fourth place finish (finishing ahead of only the Fort Wayne Chiefs in terms of teams that would actually finish their seasons properly), which resulted in them failing to qualify for the NPBL's playoffs (which was just a championship series) for this season. Following this season's conclusion, the Goodyear Wingfoots would continue playing as a team in the (local) National Industrial League until 1936, when they decided to enter the Midwest Basketball Conference that was created by Paul Sheeks of the Akron Firestone Non-Skids and Frank Kautsky of the Indianapolis Kautskys for what would ultimately become their second and final season of existence before it later became the National Basketball League.

== Roster ==
Due to information on National Professional Basketball League players being generally hard to find, there are bound to be more gaps and/or inaccuracies found in certain areas on the team's roster spots than usual.

1932–33 Akron Goodyear Wingfoots roster
Players

Pos.	No.	Player	Height	Weight	DOB	From
F/C		Dick Bolton	6 ft 2 in (1.88 m)	180 lb (82 kg)	1904–10–17	Cincinnati
G		Buck Burkle			1907–10–05	Mount Union
G/F		Frank Harrigan	6 ft 1 in (1.85 m)	195 lb (88 kg)	1904–12–28	Michigan
G		Bob Kamp	6 ft 0 in (1.83 m)	155 lb (70 kg)	1909–12–17	Illinois
G		Johnny Miner	5 ft 9 in (1.75 m)	150 lb (68 kg)	1901–05–31	Ohio State
G/F		Rex Moffett	5 ft 11 in (1.80 m)	175 lb (79 kg)	1915–05–07	DePauw
G/F		Swede Olson	6 ft 0 in (1.83 m)	150 lb (68 kg)	1904–06–29	Illinois
G/F		Burt Riel	5 ft 11 in (1.80 m)	160 lb (73 kg)	1910–09–16	Northwestern
F		Mal Rush	6 ft 0 in (1.83 m)	170 lb (77 kg)	1909–04–02	Bethany (WV)
C		Bob Taylor	6 ft 5 in (1.96 m)	185 lb (84 kg)	1906–08–26	Muskingum
G/F		Stash Wrobleski	5 ft 10 in (1.78 m)	160 lb (73 kg)	1905–10–28	Pittsburgh

Coaches
Head coach
- Smiley Weltner

Legend
- (DP) Unsigned draft pick
- (FA) Free agent
- (S) Suspended
- Injured

== NPBL Standings ==
Pos.	Team	Wins	Losses	Win %
1	Akron Firestone Non-Skids	10	1	.909
2	Toledo Crimson Coaches Tobaccos	8	4	.667
3	Indianapolis Kautskys	7	4	.636
4	Akron Goodyear Wingfoots	2	4	.333
5	Fort Wayne Chiefs	4	9	.308
6	Kokomo Kelts†	2	3	.400
7	Muncie Whys†	1	4	.200
8	South Bend Guardsmen†	1	5	.167
9	Lorain Fisher Foods†	0	1	.000

† – Dropped out of the NPBL at various points in the season.
