= Chicago Jamaco Saints =

American basketball team

The Chicago Jamaco Saints was a basketball team. They were a part of the National Alliance of Basketball Leagues.

== History ==
The Saints competed at the 1966 edition of the Intercontinental Cup. Some players that were on that team at the time included future American Basketball Association star players Steve "Snapper" Jones and Levern Tart.
