= Real Madrid Baloncesto =

Professional basketball club in Madrid, Spain

Real Madrid
- 2026–27 Real Madrid Baloncesto season
- Leagues: Liga ACB; EuroLeague
- Founded: 8 March 1931; 95 years ago
- History: Real Madrid CF (1931–present)
- Arena: Movistar Arena
- Capacity: 15,000
- Location: Madrid, Spain
- Team colours: White, Purple, Navy, Gray
- Main sponsor: Emirates
- President: Florentino Pérez
- Head coach: Pedro Martínez
- Team captain: Sergio Llull
- International titles: 11 EuroLeagues; 5 Intercontinental Cups; 1 EuroLeague SuperCup; 1 Eurocup; 4 Saporta Cups; 1 Korać Cup
- Domestic titles: 38 Spanish Championships; 29 Spanish Cups; 10 Spanish Supercups
- Retired numbers: 1 (10)
- Website: realmadrid.com
Home	Away

Real Madrid Baloncesto is a Spanish professional basketball club that was founded in 1931, as a division of Real Madrid CF. They play domestically in the Liga ACB, and internationally in the EuroLeague. They are widely regarded as one of the greatest basketball clubs in Europe. Real Madrid currently ranks second in the European professional basketball club rankings.

Similarly to the Real Madrid athletic association football club, the basketball team has been the most successful of its peers in both Spain and Europe. Real Madrid CF is the only European sports club to have become the European champions in both football and basketball in the same season (2018).

The Real Madrid squads have won a record 38 Spanish League championships, including in 7-in-a-row and 10-in-a-row sequences. They have also won a record 29 Spanish Cup titles, a record 11 EuroLeague Championships, a record 4 Saporta Cups, and a record 5 Intercontinental Cups. Madrid has also won 3 Triple Crowns, which constitute a treble of the national league, cup, and continental league won in a single season. Some of the club's star players over the years have included: Wayne Brabender, Rafael Rullán, Arvydas Sabonis, Dražen Petrović, Sergio Llull, Luka Dončić, Rudy Fernández, Serge Ibaka, Nikola Mirotić, Raül López, Louis Bullock, Felipe Reyes, Sergio Rodríguez, Carlos Suárez, Jaycee Carroll, Andrés Nocioni, Gustavo Ayón, Mirza Delibašić, Dražen Dalipagić, Juan Antonio Corbalán, Fernando Martín, Alberto Herreros, Dejan Bodiroga, Edy Tavares, Facundo Campazzo, Gabriel Deck, Trey Thompkins, Jeffery Taylor, Anthony Randolph, Fabien Causeur, Vincent Poirier, Guerschon Yabusele, Džanan Musa and Mario Hezonja.

Real Madrid also has a developmental basketball team, called Real Madrid B, that plays in the amateur-level under 22 Liga U.

== History ==
=== Early years ===
In March 1931, Ángel Cabrera, one of the earliest promotors of basketball in Spain, placed and advertisement in the newspaper ABC to recruit players for a new basketball team. The first team existed of Eric Hermes, Luis Hoyos, Emilio Gutiérrez Bringas, Juan Castellví, Jenaro Olives, Máximo Arnáiz, Juan Negrín, Midel, Delgado, Llano, and German player Midelman. The squad was officially formed on 22 March 1931, and was officially named Real Madrid Baloncesto.

As the Real Madrid club already had a firm presence with its football section, President Luis Usera wanted to expand the number of sports the club was playing to expand its reach.

In the debut season, Real Madrid won the Copa Chapultepec and played in the Castilla regional league. The first official game was played on 22 March 1931, against Dumping BC, and was lost by 19–5, despite Cabrera's 5 points. One month later, Real inaugurated its new home court in the Chamartín district.

The 1930s saw the first regional title in 1933, as well as the establishment of the women's team. The following years Real Madrid would dominate the regional league, and as such gained access to the national level. They played their first top-level game against Iluro, being defeated 21–17. The following years, the team saw an influx of international talent from Spanish colonies, including Freddy Borás, Rafael Deliz, Johnny Báez, among others, which led the team to their first three Spanish national championships, in 1957, 1958 and 1960.

=== History of great success: 1950s to 1980s ===
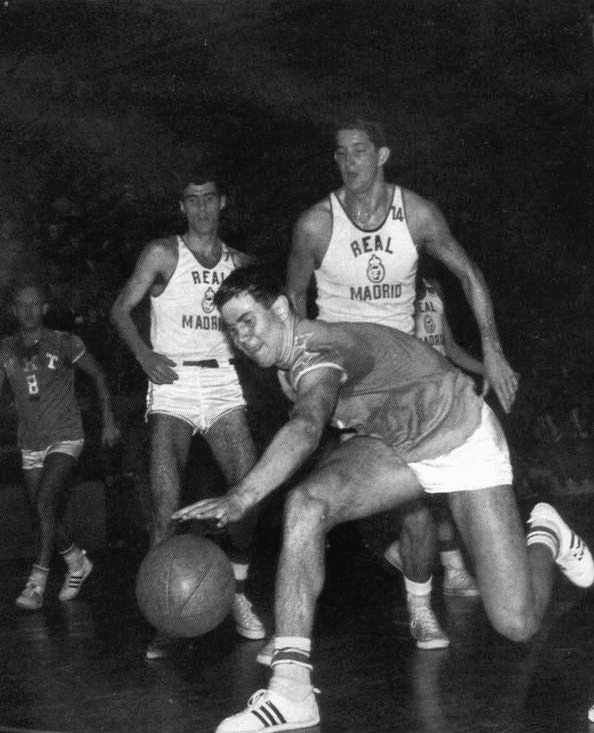
Real Madrid players during a fixture in 1965

For at least half a century, Madrid has been a standard-bearer in European basketball, accumulating a record ten continental titles, based on its dominance in the 1960s. Its early dominance in Spain has resulted in another untouchable cache of 38 national domestic league and 29 national cup trophies.

Madrid downed Olimpia Milano in the 1984 Cup Winners' Cup, on free throws made by Brian Jackson, then Petrović had 62 points in the 1989 Cup Winners' Cup final, against Snaidero Caserta. Madrid added a 1988 Korać Cup title, against Cibona Zagreb.

=== 1990–2010 ===
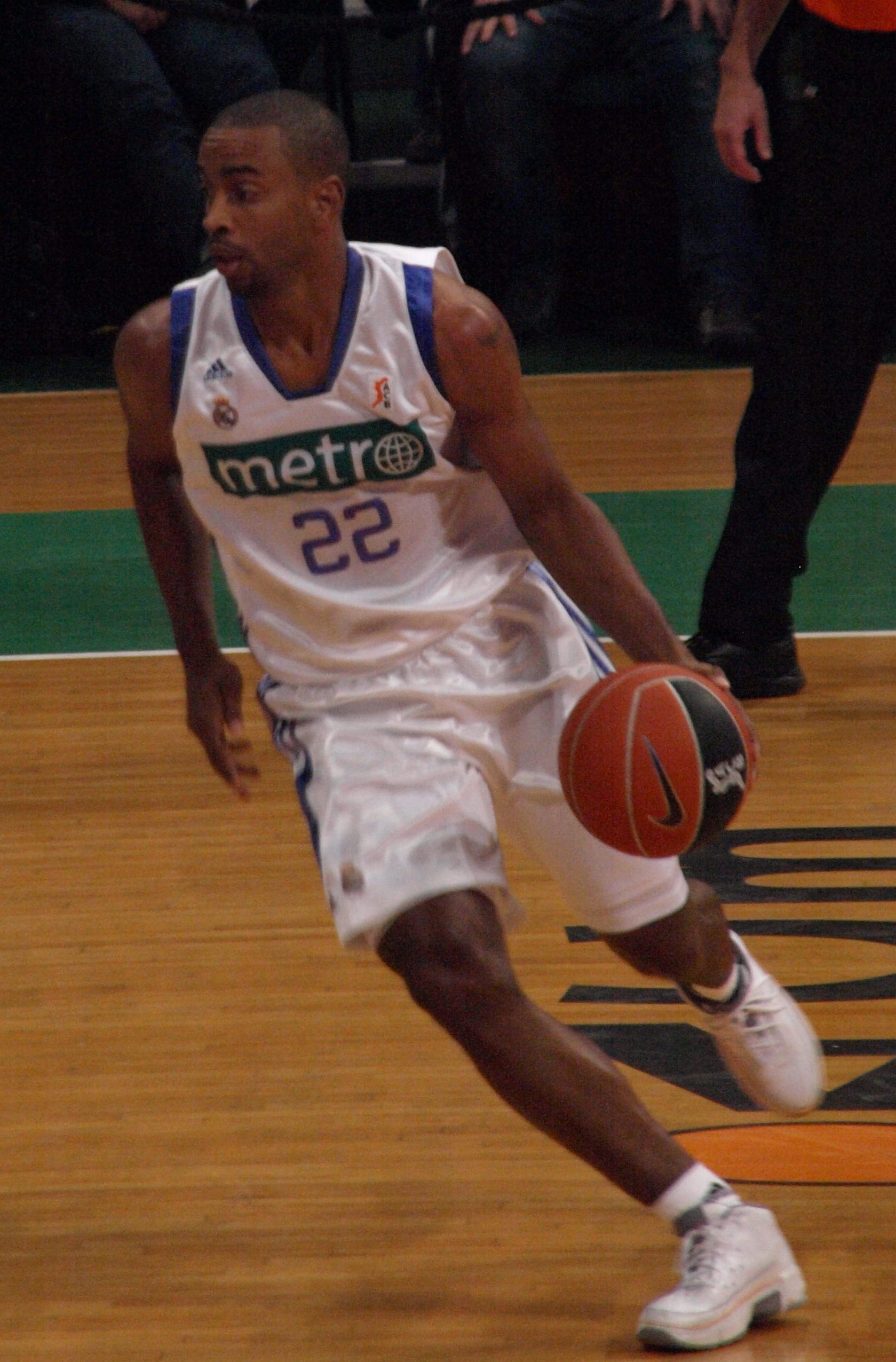
Louis Bullock in 2008

Real Madrid won the 1992 Saporta Cup trophy against PAOK, on a buzzer-beating jumper by Rickey Brown. It was not until Sabonis arrived in Madrid, when Real won its eighth EuroLeague title in 1995, by beating Olympiacos in the final. Madrid next won the 1997 Saporta Cup title against Verona, but no more European-wide trophies came for the club in the next decade.

Madrid still found success at home, winning Spanish League titles in 2000 and 2005. It all changed in 2007, when Joan Plaza was promoted to the club's head coach position. With the help of players like Louis Bullock, Felipe Reyes, and Álex Mumbrú, Madrid added a new trophy to its roll of honours, the ULEB Cup, as it won 12 of its last 13 games and downed Lietuvos Rytas by a score of 75–87 in the 2007 ULEB Cup Final. Moreover, Madrid finished in 2nd place in the 2006–07 Spanish League regular season, and stayed strong in its play in Palacio Vistalegre during the Spanish league playoffs; they lifted the club's 30th national league trophy by besting their arch-rivals, Winterthur FC Barcelona, 3–1 in the Spanish League title series in 2007.

=== 2011–2022: Pablo Laso era ===
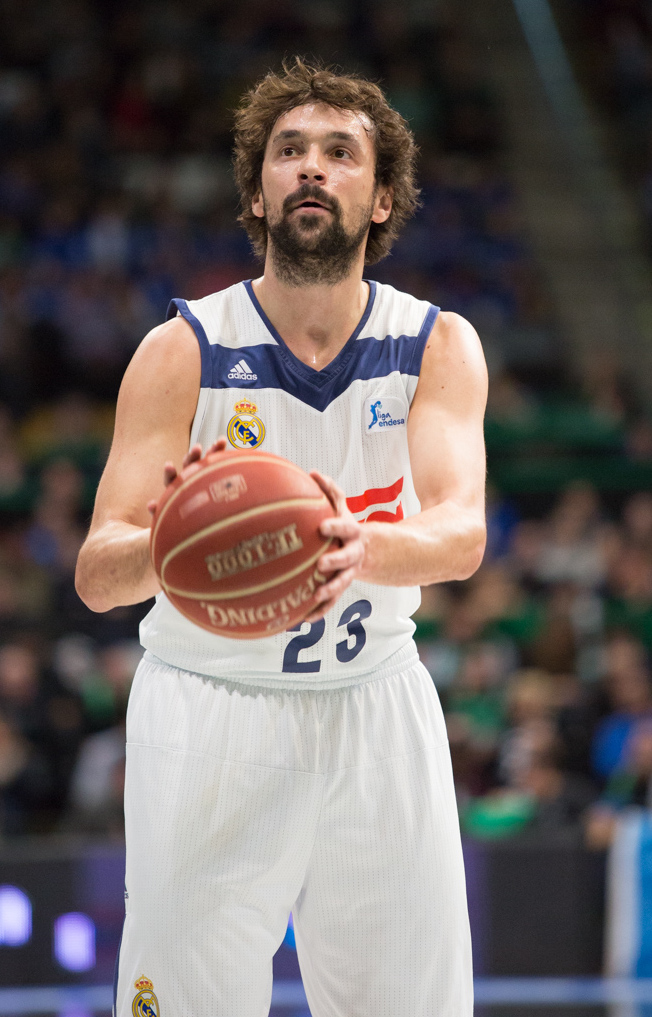
Sergio Llull grew as a player under Laso to become one of the most valuable ACB guards

In Pablo Laso's era, Real Madrid Baloncesto managed to find consistent success. Spanish top-tier level players of the time, like Sergio Rodríguez and Rudy Fernández, were acquired by the club. Also, ACB Rising Star winner Nikola Mirotić was a part of the team's mix, along with Sergio Llull and Felipe Reyes, to give Real Madrid a strong home grown core of players. This group of players gave Real Madrid Baloncesto 6 Copa del Reys (Spanish Cup) titles, 7 Spanish Super Cup titles, 6 Liga ACB (Spanish League) titles, 2 EuroLeague championships, and an FIBA Intercontinental Cup championship.

On 17 May 2015, after waiting 20 years to win another EuroLeague championship, Real Madrid won the 2015 EuroLeague championship against Olympiacos. Madrid's Andrés Nocioni was named the Final Four MVP. This title was called La Novena. Following the EuroLeague title, the 2014–15 ACB season's championship was also won by Real. Because Real also won the national Spanish Cup and the national Spanish Supercup that season, the club won its first "Quadruble crown".

On 27 September 2015, 34 years after their last FIBA Intercontinental Cup title, Real Madrid won their fifth FIBA Intercontinental Cup trophy, after defeating the Brazilian League club Bauru. Sergio Llull was named the MVP of the tournament. Real Madrid thus made it a record five FIBA Intercontinental Cup titles won, and with the Intercontinental Cup title.

On 20 May 2018, Real Madrid conquered again the EuroLeague, achieving their tenth title ever. The considered major leader of the team that season would be a Slovenian guard/forward named Luka Dončić, who became the designated MVP of the EuroLeague on all accounts at 19 years old.

On 5 June 2022, Pablo Laso suffered a heart attack. Exactly one month later, Real Madrid parted ways with him citing "medical reasons exclusively" and adding that keeping him as a coach in his health condition would have been "a risk that this institution cannot assume". Laso left Real Madrid as one of the greatest coaches in the club's history, having won 22 titles, which ties him with Lolo Sainz in the second place for most trophies won with Real Madrid, only behind Pedro Ferrándiz with 27. Laso is also the coach who has managed the most games for Madrid (860), having won 659 of them. He was succeeded at Real Madrid's helm by his assistant Chus Mateo.

=== 2022—present Post-Laso era ===
In the 2022–23 season, Chus Mateo became the new head coach for the team. They signed additional players including Petr Cornelie, Mario Hezonja, Džanan Musa, with Sergio Rodríguez returning for the team, which ranked third in EuroLeague standings. In the playoffs, they faced Partizan in the quarterfinals. Madrid lost its first two games at home. In Game 2 of the quarterfinals, in 1 minute and 40 seconds, Sergio Llull drew a flagrant foul on Kevin Punter; and both teams, as well as players on the bench, went on the court to fight. Guerschon Yabusele slammed Danté Exum, leading Exum injured with a ruptured tendon in his toe and an injured lip and leaving on crutches. The game ended in a brawl. The EuroLeague gave suspensions to Gabriel Deck and Guerschon Yabusele from the Real side and Punter and Mathias Lessort from Partizan's side. Madrid won the next 3 games and became the first EuroLeague team to come back from a 2–0 deficit in the playoffs to qualify to the 2023 EuroLeague Final Four. In the semifinals, they beat Barcelona 78–66 in the semifinals. Real Madrid won their record–extending eleventh EuroLeague title, beating Olympiacos in the championship game, the first in 5 years. The previous year, they lost the championship game versus Anadolu Efes 57–58 in the final, Sergio Llull winning with a clutch 2-point shot with 3.1 seconds to go. Real Madrid beating Olympiacos 79–78 in the final. In Liga ACB, the team ended third in regular season but they lost to Barcelona 0–3 in the finals.

In the following 2023–24 EuroLeague season, Real ended as a top seed during the regular season with a 27-7 which whom they defend the EuroLeague title again. In the Quarterfinals, they faced Baskonia with a perfect 3-0 which whom the first team to qualified to the 2024 EuroLeague Final Four in Berlin. In the semifinals, they faced Olypiacos once again, which is the rematch of the previous year's final and Real won 87–76 in the semis. In the final they faced Panathinakos AKTOR. Despite an early start in the first quarter, Panathinakos returned a comeback in the next three quarters. In the third quarter, Real only scored 7 points. Then in the fourth quarter Panathinaikos went a massive game outscoring 31 points out of Real's 19 points in the fourth and final quarter and Real did not comeback afterwards which Panathinakos won with a big win 95-80 and won its first EuroLeague trophy after (which was the Panathinaikos seventh EuroLeague title) after thirteen years. Despite that, they won the 2023–24 ACB season beating Murcia 3–1 in the finals.

== Sponsorship naming ==
- Real Madrid Otaysa 1990–1991
- Real Madrid Asegurator 1991–1992
- Real Madrid Teka 1992–1995 and 1996–2000

== Home arenas ==
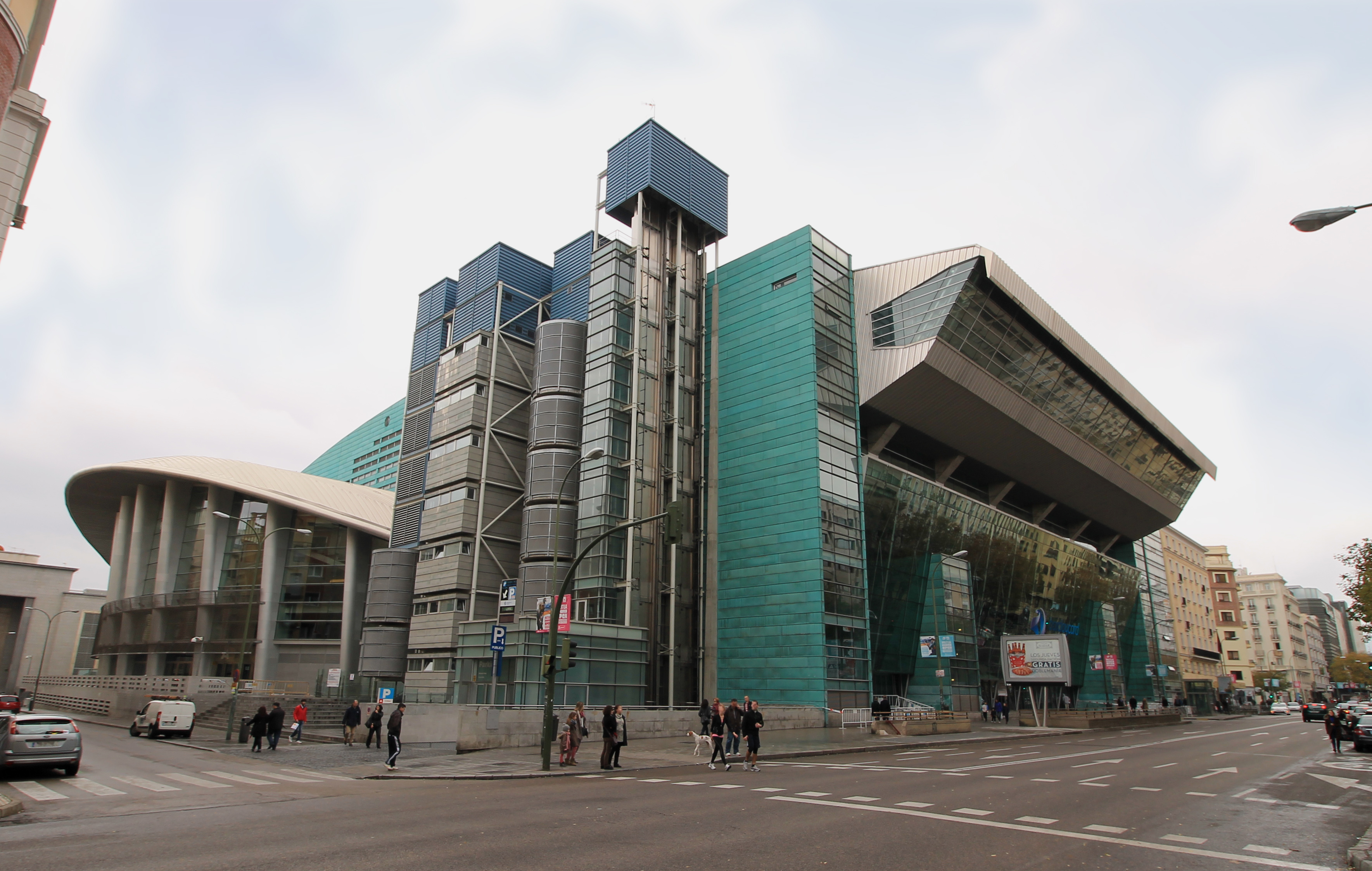
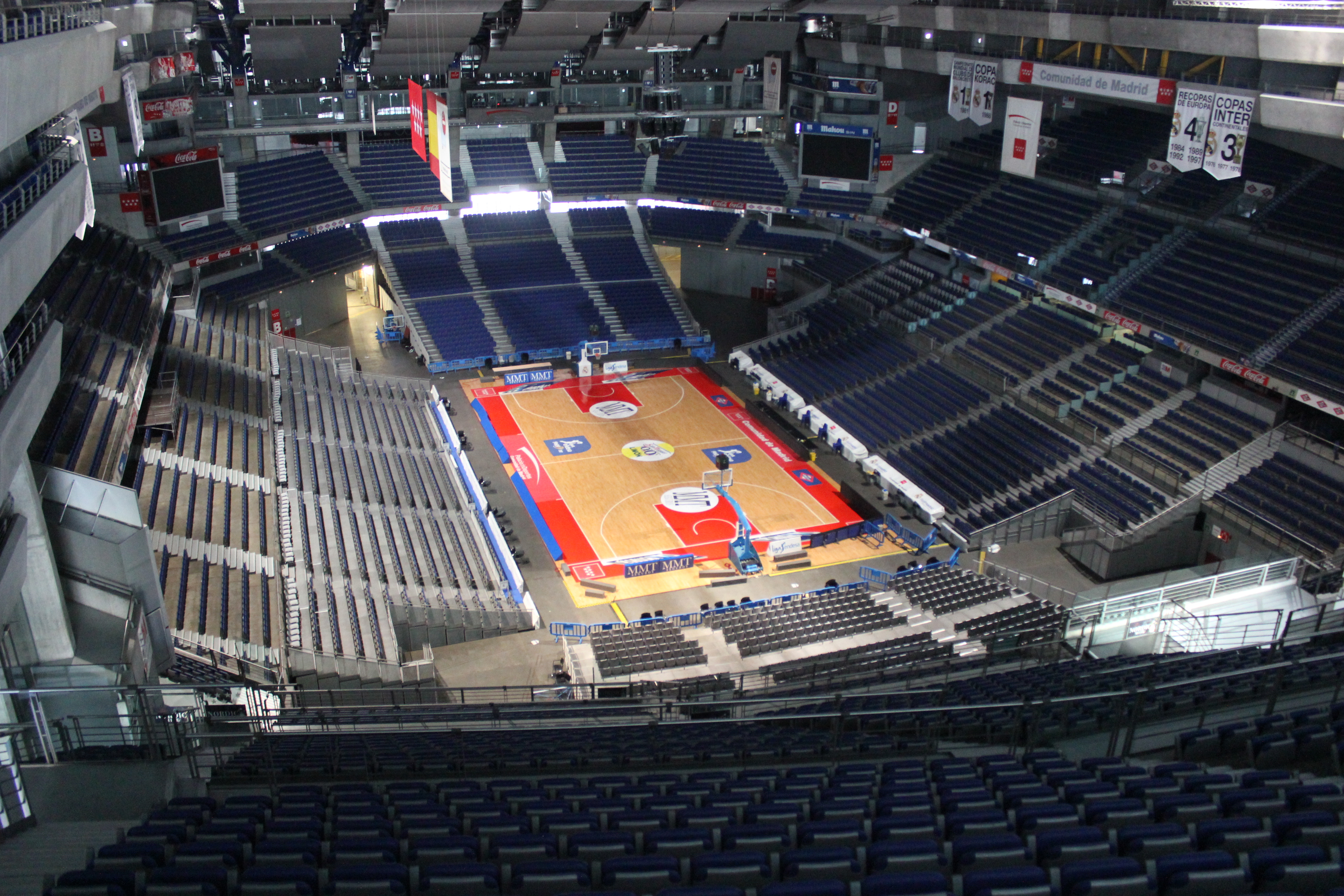
External and internal view of Palacio de Deportes de la Comunidad de Madrid
- Estadio Chamartín (1931–1936), outdoor basketball court under the stands of Real Madrid football stadium.
- Frontón Recoletos (1939–1952), first indoor court, an adapted basque pelota fronton located in Salamanca district.
- Frontón Jai Alai (1952–1965), first big court and official headquarters of the club, also a converted fronton located in Los Jerónimos neighborhood.
- Colegio Maravillas (1965), used during the construction of the new pavilion.
- Pabellón de la Ciudad Deportiva del Real Madrid (1966–1986), first pavilion owned by the club, located in its training complex north of the city.
- Palacio de Deportes de la Comunidad de Madrid (1986–1998).
- Pabellón Parque Corredor (1998–1999), in the city of Torrejón de Ardoz, used during the renovation of the club pavilion.
- Pabellón Raimundo Saporta (1999–2004), the renovated and renamed Pabellón de la Ciudad Deportiva.
- Palacio Vistalegre (2004–2010).
- Caja Mágica (2010–2011).
- Palacio de Deportes – Movistar Arena (2011–present).

== Players ==
=== Current roster ===
Note: Flags indicate national team eligibility at FIBA-sanctioned events. Players may hold other non-FIBA nationalities not displayed.

Real Madrid roster
Players
Coaches

Pos.	No.	Nat.	Name	Ht.	Wt.	Age
SG	1	(United States)	Smith Jr., Nick	1.88 m (6 ft 2 in)	84 kg (185 lb)	22 – 18 April 2004
SG	2	(Ukraine)	Shulga, Max	1.97 m (6 ft 6 in)	95 kg (209 lb)	24 – 25 June 2002
G/F	3	(France)	Luwawu-Cabarrot, Timothé	2.00 m (6 ft 7 in)	98 kg (216 lb)	31 – 9 May 1995
PF	4	(Spain)	Pradilla, Jaime	2.05 m (6 ft 9 in)	106 kg (234 lb)	25 – 3 January 2001
G/F	6	(Spain)	Abalde, Alberto	2.02 m (6 ft 8 in)	95 kg (209 lb)	30 – 15 December 1995
PG	7	(Argentina)	Campazzo, Facundo (injured)	1.80 m (5 ft 11 in)	88 kg (194 lb)	35 – 23 March 1991
F	8	(Nigeria)	Okeke, Chuma	2.01 m (6 ft 7 in)	104 kg (229 lb)	28 – 18 August 1998
G/F	9	(Italy)	Procida, Gabriele	2.01 m (6 ft 7 in)	88 kg (194 lb)	24 – 1 June 2002
G	12	(France)	Maledon, Théo (injured)	1.97 m (6 ft 6 in)	79 kg (174 lb)	25 – 12 June 2001
F	14	(Argentina)	Deck, Gabriel (injured)	1.98 m (6 ft 6 in)	105 kg (231 lb)	31 – 8 February 1995
F/C	16	(Spain)	Garuba, Usman (injured)	2.03 m (6 ft 8 in)	115 kg (254 lb)	24 – 9 March 2002
PF	20	(Finland)	Jantunen, Mikael (injured)	2.04 m (6 ft 8 in)	100 kg (220 lb)	26 – 20 April 2000
C	22	(Cape Verde)	Tavares, Edy	2.22 m (7 ft 3 in)	125 kg (276 lb)	34 – 22 March 1992
G	23	(Spain)	Llull, Sergio (C)	1.94 m (6 ft 4 in)	94 kg (207 lb)	39 – 15 November 1987
G	24	(Dominican Republic)	Feliz, Andrés	1.88 m (6 ft 2 in)	92 kg (203 lb)	29 – 15 July 1997
C	30	(United States)	Jones, Damian	2.11 m (6 ft 11 in)	111 kg (245 lb)	31 – 30 June 1995
C	33	(France)	Sarr, Olivier	2.15 m (7 ft 1 in)	109 kg (240 lb)	27 – 20 February 1999
PF	44	(Spain)	Ndiaye, Eli	2.04 m (6 ft 8 in)	95 kg (209 lb)	22 – 26 June 2004

Head coach

- (Spain) Pedro Martínez

Assistant coach(es)

- (Spain) Francisco Redondo
- (Spain) Salva Camps
- (Spain) Isidoro Calín
- (Spain) Piti Hurtado
- (Spain) David Jimeno

Athletic trainer(s)

- (Spain) Juan Trapero

Legend

- (C) Team captain
- (Y) Youth player
- Injured

- Roster
Updated: November 15, 2026

=== Depth chart ===
Pos.	Starting 5	Bench 1	Bench 2	Inactive
C	Edy Tavares †	Damian Jones *	Olivier Sarr °	Usman Garuba † (injured)
PF	Jaime Pradilla †	Chuma Okeke ^	Eli Ndiaye †	Mikael Jantunen ° (injured)
SF	Gabriele Procida °	Timothé Luwawu-Cabarrot °		Gabriel Deck † (injured)
SG	Alberto Abalde †	Nick Smith Jr. *	Max Shulga †
PG	Théo Maledon °	Andrés Feliz ^	Sergio Llull †	Facundo Campazzo ° (injured)

Notes: Blue † – Spanish or homegrown player; (Note: A homegrown player is a player that played for at least three years before the age of 20 on a Spanish team. In Liga ACB, the team must register at least four homegrown players in rosters of 10–12 players or at least three homegrown players in rosters of 8–9 players. In EuroLeague, the team did not have any limitations regarding the number of homegrown players.) Red * – overseas player; (Note: An overseas player is a player from outside EEA, FIBA Europe or ACP states. In Liga ACB, the team may register at most two overseas players. In EuroLeague, the team did not have any limitations regarding the number of overseas players.) Purple °; – community player (Note: Comunitarios (loosely translated as "Community players") refers to any player who holds a passport from a country within the European Union (EU), the European Economic Area (EEA), or an associated nation with specific treaties. In Liga ACB, if a European player signs with a Spanish team, they are registered as a Comunitario. Teams can theoretically sign an unlimited number of these players, provided they still satisfy the mandatory homegrown quota (cupos).) Gold ^; – cotonou status player (Note: Cotonou status is a massive roster loophole in European basketball. It allows players from 78 African, Caribbean, and Pacific (ACP) countries to be treated exactly like EU citizens (Comunitarios) for employment purposes. In Liga ACB, a player with a passport from a Cotonou country does not count toward the maximum limit of 2 non-EU imports.) Green ‡ – youth player (Note: In Liga ACB, the team may register under-22 players linked to the youth system. In EuroLeague, the team may register under-20 players linked to the youth system.)

=== Players out on loan ===
Players out on loan
Nat.	Player	Position	Team
(Spain)	Eli Ndiaye	PF	(Spain) Joventut Badalona

=== Retired numbers ===
Real Madrid retired numbers
No	Nat.	Player	Position	Tenure
10	(Spain)	Fernando Martín	C	1981–1986, 1987–1989

=== Naismith Memorial Basketball Hall of Famers ===
The following former Real Madrid players are inducted into the Naismith Memorial Basketball Hall of Fame:

- (Serbia) Dražen Dalipagić, G, 1982–1983, Inducted 2004
- (Spain) Antonio Díaz-Miguel, F, 1958–1961, Inducted 1997
- (Spain) Pedro Ferrándiz, coach, 1959–1962, 1964–1965, 1966–1975, Inducted 2007
- (Croatia) Dražen Petrović, G, 1988–1989, Inducted 2002
- (Lithuania) Arvydas Sabonis, C, 1992–1995, Inducted 2011

=== Record holders ===
Top scorers			Most official matches
1.	(Spain) Sergio Llull	11 515 points	1.	(Spain) Sergio Llull	1084 matches
2.	(Spain) (United States) Wayne Brabender	11 215 points	2.	(Spain) Felipe Reyes	1046 matches
3.	(Spain) Felipe Reyes	9 613 points	3.	(Spain) Rudy Fernández	757 matches
4.	(United States) (Azerbaijan) Jaycee Carroll	7 332 points	4.	(United States) (Azerbaijan) Jaycee Carroll	709 matches
5.	(Spain) Rafael Rullán	7 135 points	5.	(Spain) Sergio Rodríguez	580 matches
Show complete list			Show complete list

== Head coaches ==
- (Spain) Ángel Cabrera: 1931–33
- (Spain) Juan Castellví: 1931–34
- (Spain) Máximo Arnáiz: 1934–35
- (Mexico) Segundo Braña: 1935–36
- (Peru) Cholo Méndez: 1939–43
- (Spain) (Mexico) Anselmo López: 1943–45, 1946–47
- (Spain) José Borrero: 1947–48
- (Philippines) Felipe Kaimo Calderón: 1948–49
- (Puerto Rico) Freddy Borrás: 1949–1954
- (Spain) Ignacio Pinedo: 1954–1958, 1990–1991
- (Spain) Jacinto Ardevínez: 1958–1959
- (Spain) Pedro Ferrándiz: 1959–1962, 1964–1965, 1966–1975
- (Spain) Joaquín Hernández: 1962–1964
- (France) Robert Busnel: 1965–1966
- (Spain) Lolo Sainz: 1975–1989
- (United States) George Karl: 1989–1990, 1991–1992
- (Spain) (United States) Wayne Brabender: 1990
- (Spain) Ángel González Jareño: 1991.
- (Spain) (United States) Clifford Luyk: 1992–1994, 1998–1999
- (Federal Republic of Yugoslavia) Željko Obradović: 1994–1997
- (Spain) Miguel Ángel Martín: 1997
- (Spain) Tirso Lorente: 1998
- (Italy) Sergio Scariolo: 1999–2002, 2025–2026
- (Spain) Javier Imbroda: 2002–2003
- (Argentina) Julio Lamas: 2003–2004
- (Serbia and Montenegro) Božidar Maljković: 2004–2006
- (Spain) Joan Plaza: 2006–2009
- (Italy) Ettore Messina: 2009–2011
- (Italy) Emanuele Molin: 2011
- (Spain) Pablo Laso: 2011–2022
- (Spain) Chus Mateo: 2022–2025
- (Spain) Pedro Martínez: 2026–present

== Honours and other achievements ==
Honours
Type	Competition	Titles	Seasons
International	EuroLeague	11	1964, 1965, 1967, 1968, 1974, 1978, 1980, 1995, 2015, 2018, 2023
International	FIBA Intercontinental Cup	5	1976, 1977, 1978, 1981, 2015
International	EuroCup	1	2007
International	FIBA Saporta Cup	4	1984, 1989, 1992, 1997
International	FIBA Korać Cup	1	1988
International	EuroLeague SuperCup	1	2026
Domestic	Spanish League	38	1957, 1958, 1960, 1961, 1962, 1963, 1964, 1965, 1966, 1968, 1969, 1970, 1971, 1972, 1973, 1974, 1975, 1976, 1977, 1979, 1980, 1982, 1984, 1985, 1986, 1993, 1994, 2000, 2005, 2007, 2013, 2015, 2016, 2018, 2019, 2022, 2024, 2025
Domestic	Spanish Cup	29	1951, 1952, 1954, 1956, 1957, 1960, 1961, 1962, 1965, 1966, 1967, 1970, 1971, 1972, 1973, 1974, 1975, 1977, 1985, 1986, 1989, 1993, 2012, 2014, 2015, 2016, 2017, 2020, 2024
Domestic	Spanish Supercup	10	1984, 2012, 2013, 2014, 2018, 2019, 2020, 2021, 2022, 2023

- Record title holders

=== Other Achievements ===
==== Trebles ====
- Triple Crown
  - Seasons (3): 1964–65, 1973–74, 2014–15

==== International competitions ====
- EuroLeague
  - Runners-up (11): 1961–62, 1962–63, 1968–69, 1974–75, 1975–76, 1984–85, 2012–13, 2013–14, 2021–22, 2023–24, 2025–26
  - Semifinalists (7): 1958, 1960–61, 1969–70, 1970–71, 1971–72, 1980–81, 1986–87
  - Third place (2): 1982–83, 2018–19
  - Fourth place (7): 1976–77, 1978–79, 1985–86, 1992–93, 1995–96, 2010–11, 2016–17
  - Final Four (15): 1967, 1993, 1995, 1996, 2011, 2013, 2014, 2015, 2017, 2018, 2019, 2022, 2023, 2024, 2026
- FIBA Saporta Cup (defunct)
  - Runners-up (2): 1981–82, 1989–90
- FIBA Korać Cup (defunct)
  - Runners-up (1): 1990–91
- EuroCup
  - Runners-up (1): 2003–04
- FIBA Intercontinental Cup
  - Runners-up (3): 1965^{*}, 1968, 1970
  - Third place (2): 1966, 1975
  - Fourth place (3): 1969, 1974, 1980
- McDonald's Championship
  - Runners-up (1): 1988
  - Third place (1): 1993
  - Fourth place (1): 1995
- Latin Cup
  - Winners (1): 1953
  - Runners-up (1): 1966
- European Basketball Club Super Cup (semi-official, ACB International Tournament "Memorial Héctor Quiroga", defunct)
  - Winners (3): 1984, 1988, 1989
  - Runners-up (1): 1986
  - Third place (2): 1983, 1985

^{*} Unofficial edition

==== Regional competitions ====
- Torneo Comunidad de Madrid

Winners (20): 1984, 1985, 1986, 1987, 1989, 1991, 1994, 1995, 1997, 2000, 2004, 2005, 2006, 2007, 2008, 2009, 2010, 2011, 2012, 2013
Runners-up (8):

- Campeonato de Castilla

Winners (11): 1933, 1942, 1943, 1944, 1948, 1949, 1950, 1953, 1954, 1956, 1957
Runners-up (8):

- Trofeo Marca

Winners (8): 1957, 1958, 1961, 1962, 1963, 1964, 1966, 1967

==== Friendly competitions ====
- FIBA International Christmas Tournament (Trofeo "Raimundo Saporta"-Memorial "Fernando Martín")

26: 1967, 1968, 1969, 1970, 1972, 1973, 1974, 1975, 1976, 1977, 1978, 1980, 1981, 1985, 1986, 1987, 1990, 1991, 1992, 1995, 1996, 1997, 2000, 2003, 2004, 2006.

- 7 Trofeo Costa del Sol: 2012, 2016, 2017, 2018, 2019, 2021, 2022.
- 3 Trofeo Gol: 1941–42, 1942–43, 1943–44. (Note: AAVV. Cien Años del Real Madrid. Vol. 16 Historia del Baloncesto. Madrid, As, 2001, pág. 17–20)
- 3 Trofeo Teresa Herrera: 1987, 1989, 1991. (Note: AAVV. Cien Años del Real Madrid. Vol. 16 Historia del Baloncesto. Madrid, As, 2001, pág. 115)
- 3 Trofeo Ciudat de Zaragoza: 2005, 2011, 2014.
- 2 Trofeo Montbrisson: 1959, 1960.
- 2 Trofeos Open de París: 1961–62, 1962–63.
- 2 Torneo de Navidad de Bruselas: 1948, 1950.
- 2 Trofeo Diputación Valladolid: 1997, 2009.
- 2 Torneo Ciudad de Córdoba: 2013, 2015.
- 2 Trofeo de Torneig de Bàsquet Junior Ciutat de L'Hospitalet: 2015, 2016.
- 1 Copa Chapultepec: 1931.
- 1 Torneo Primavera de Madrid: 1934.
- 1 Trofeo Cupones Cork: 1946.
- 1 Torneo Inauguración (Madrid): 1951.
- 1 Torneo Bodas de Oro del Real Madrid: 1952.
- 1 Torneo Bodas de Oro del Club: 1952.
- 1 Trofeo Homenaje a Luis Moreno Melilla: 1952.
- 1 Torneo Bodas de Plata de la Sección: 1955.
- 1 Torneo Internacional de Portugal: 1955.
- 1 Torneo de Vigo: 1956.
- 1 Torneo Triangular: 1956.
- 1 Torneo de Gijón: 1956.
- 1 Trofeo XII Juegos del Sudeste (Alicante): 1960.
- 1 Torneo de Casablanca: 1962.
- 1 Trofeo Open de París: 1962.
- 1 Trofeo Bodas de Plata del Canoe: 1965.
- 1 Trofeo Breogán: 1967.
- 1 Galardón As de Oro: 1977–78.
- 1 Trofeo Nuevo Banco (Madrid): 1978.
- 1 Torneo de la Pollinica (Málaga): 1985–86.
- 1 Trofeo Memorial Gasca (San Sebastián): 1985–86.
- 1 Torneo de San Julián (Cuenca): 1986–87.
- 1 Trofeo 50 Aniversario Diario Sur: 1988.
- 1 Trofeo Canal +: 1991.
- 1 Trofeo Ciutat de Palma: 2007
- 1 Torneo de Diada de Mallorca : 2008.
- 1 San Sebastian, Spain Invitational Game : 2009.
- 1 La Nucia, Alicante, Spain Invitational Game: 2010.
- 1 Torneo Sportquarters de Guadalajara: 2012.
- 1 Torneo Spa Porta Maris & Suites del Mar: 2012.
- 1 Trofeo Grupo Dalmau Vaquer: 2014.
- 1 Copa EuroAmericana: 2014.
- 1 Arganda del Rey, Spain Invitational Game: 2017.
- 1 Burgos, Spain Invitational Game: 2018.
- 1 Torneo San Mateo: 2019.
- 1 Trofeo Memorial Jose Luis Abos: 2019.

=== Individual awards ===
ACB Most Valuable Player

- Arvydas Sabonis – 1994, 1995
- Dejan Bodiroga – 1998
- Tanoka Beard – 1999
- Felipe Reyes – 2009, 2015
- Nikola Mirotić – 2013
- Sergio Llull – 2017
- Luka Dončić – 2018
- Facundo Campazzo – 2024
- Mario Hezonja - 2026

ACB Finals MVP

- Arvydas Sabonis – 1993, 1994
- Alberto Angulo – 2000
- Louis Bullock – 2005
- Felipe Reyes – 2007, 2013
- Sergio Llull – 2015, 2016
- Rudy Fernández – 2018
- Facundo Campazzo – 2019, 2025
- Edy Tavares – 2022
- Džanan Musa – 2024

All-ACB First Team

- Elmer Bennett – 2004
- Felipe Reyes – 2007, 2008, 2009, 2015
- Ante Tomić – 2011
- Sergio Llull – 2012, 2015, 2017
- Rudy Fernández – 2013, 2014
- Nikola Mirotić – 2013, 2014
- Sergio Rodríguez – 2013, 2014, 2016
- Luka Dončić – 2018
- Facundo Campazzo – 2019, 2020, 2024
- Edy Tavares – 2019, 2021, 2023
- Džanan Musa – 2023
- Mario Hezonja – 2025, 2026

All-ACB Second Team

- Gustavo Ayón – 2016
- Anthony Randolph – 2017
- Facundo Campazzo – 2018
- Edy Tavares – 2020, 2022, 2026

ACB Three Point Shootout Champion

- Alberto Herreros – 1998, 1999
- Alberto Angulo – 2000
- Louis Bullock – 2004, 2006, 2008
- Jaycee Carroll – 2015, 2016

ACB Slam Dunk Champion

- Mickaël Gelabale – 2004, 2005

ACB Most Spectacular Player of the Year

- Rudy Fernández – 2013
- Sergio Rodríguez – 2014

Spanish Cup MVP

- Sergio Llull – 2012, 2017
- Nikola Mirotić – 2014
- Rudy Fernández – 2015
- Gustavo Ayón – 2016
- Facundo Campazzo – 2020, 2024

Spanish Supercup MVP

- Rudy Fernández – 2012
- Sergio Rodríguez – 2013
- Sergio Llull – 2014, 2018, 2021
- Facundo Campazzo – 2019, 2020, 2023
- Edy Tavares – 2022

EuroLeague MVP

- Sergio Rodríguez – 2014
- Sergio Llull – 2017
- Luka Dončić – 2018

EuroLeague Final Four MVP

- Arvydas Sabonis – 1995
- Andrés Nocioni – 2015
- Luka Dončić – 2018
- Edy Tavares – 2023

FIBA Intercontinental Cup MVP

- Walter Szczerbiak – 1977
- Sergio Llull – 2015

All-EuroLeague First Team

- Rudy Fernández – 2013, 2014
- Sergio Rodríguez – 2014
- Felipe Reyes – 2015
- Sergio Llull – 2017
- Luka Dončić – 2018
- Edy Tavares – 2021, 2022, 2023
- Džanan Musa – 2023
- Facundo Campazzo – 2024

All-EuroLeague Second Team

- Sergio Llull – 2011
- Nikola Mirotić – 2013, 2014
- Rudy Fernández – 2015
- Gustavo Ayón – 2016, 2017
- Edy Tavares – 2019, 2024, 2025, 2026
- Mario Hezonja – 2024

EuroLeague Rising Star

- Nikola Mirotić – 2011, 2012
- Luka Dončić – 2017, 2018
- Usman Garuba – 2021

EuroLeague Best Defender

- Edy Tavares – 2019, 2021, 2023

== Season by season ==
Season	Tier	Division	Pos.	W–L	Copa del Rey	Other cups		European competitions		
1931–56	Copa del Rey		4 times champion (1951, 1952, 1954, 1956), 6 times runner-up (1933, 1944, 1948, 1949, 1953, 1955)							
1957	1	1ª División	1st	7–3	Champion					
1958	1	1ª División	1st	16–2	Runner-up			1 Champions Cup	SF	3–1
1958–59	1	1ª División	2nd	19–3	Semifinalist			1 Champions Cup	R16	3–1
1959–60	1	1ª División	1st	20–2	Champion					
1960–61	1	1ª División	1st	21–1	Champion			1 Champions Cup	SF	5–1
1961–62	1	1ª División	1st	18–0	Champion			1 Champions Cup	RU	5–4
1962–63	1	1ª División	1st	14–2	Runner-up			1 Champions Cup	RU	7–4
1963–64	1	1ª División	1st	19–3	Fourth place			1 Champions Cup	C	8–2
1964–65	1	1ª División	1st	13–1	Champion	Intercontinental Cup	RU	1 Champions Cup	C	6–2
1965–66	1	1ª División	1st	16–2	Champion	Intercontinental Cup	3rd	1 Champions Cup	QF	5–3
1966–67	1	1ª División	2nd	18–2	Champion			1 Champions Cup	C	10–2
1967–68	1	1ª División	1st	18–2	Semifinalist	Intercontinental Cup	RU	1 Champions Cup	C	10–3
1968–69	1	1ª División	1st	18–1–3	Runner-up	Intercontinental Cup	4th	1 Champions Cup	RU	10–3
1969–70	1	1ª División	1st	19–3	Champion	Intercontinental Cup	RU	1 Champions Cup	SF	6–6
1970–71	1	1ª División	1st	21–1	Champion			1 Champions Cup	SF	7–1–4
1971–72	1	1ª División	1st	21–1	Champion			1 Champions Cup	SF	8–4
1972–73	1	1ª División	1st	30–0	Champion			1 Champions Cup	QF	7–3
1973–74	1	1ª División	1st	27–1–0	Champion			1 Champions Cup	C	12–1
1974–75	1	1ª División	1st	20–2	Champion	Intercontinental Cup	4th	1 Champions Cup	RU	9–1–1
1975–76	1	1ª División	1st	29–3	Runner-up	Intercontinental Cup	3rd	1 Champions Cup	RU	12–3
1976–77	1	1ª División	1st	21–1	Champion	Intercontinental Cup	C	1 Champions Cup	SF	12–4
1977–78	1	1ª División	2nd	19–3	Runner-up	Intercontinental Cup	C	1 Champions Cup	C	14–3
1978–79	1	1ª División	1st	19–2–1	Semifinalist	Intercontinental Cup	C	1 Champions Cup	SF	12–4
1979–80	1	1ª División	1st	20–2	Quarterfinalist			1 Champions Cup	C	14–3
1980–81	1	1ª División	3rd	18–2–6	Runner-up	Intercontinental Cup	4th	1 Champions Cup	SF	10–6
1981–82	1	1ª División	1st	25–1	Runner-up	Intercontinental Cup	C	2 Cup Winners' Cup	RU	10–1
1982–83	1	1ª División	2nd	25–2	Semifinalist			1 Cup Champions Cup	SF	8–6
1983–84	1	Liga ACB	1st	31–5	Third place			2 Cup Winners' Cup	C	8–1
1984–85	1	Liga ACB	1st	33–3	Champion	Supercopa	C	1 Champions Cup	RU	10–1–4
1985–86	1	Liga ACB	1st	30–4	Champion	Supercopa	RU	1 Champions Cup	SF	9–5
1986–87	1	Liga ACB	4th	23–12	Quarterfinalist	Supercopa	RU	1 Champions Cup	SF	7–7
1986–87	1	Liga ACB	4th	23–12	Quarterfinalist	Copa Príncipe	QF	1 Champions Cup	SF	7–7
1987–88	1	Liga ACB	2nd	32–7	Champion	Copa Príncipe	RU	3 Korać Cup	C	10–2
1988–89	1	Liga ACB	2nd	36–11	Champion	Copa Príncipe	SF	2 Cup Winners' Cup	C	10–1
1989–90	1	Liga ACB	3rd	26–15	Semifinalist			2 Cup Winners' Cup	RU	8–3
1990–91	1	Liga ACB	5th	26–12	Fourth place	Copa Príncipe	SF	3 Korać Cup	RU	8–6
1991–92	1	Liga ACB	2nd	33–15	Quarterfinalist			2 European Cup	C	13–1–1
1992–93	1	Liga ACB	1st	35–10	Champion			1 European League	4th	16–4
1993–94	1	Liga ACB	1st	34–6	Semifinalist			1 European League	QF	9–7
1994–95	1	Liga ACB	3rd	27–19	Fourth place			1 European League	C	13–5
1995–96	1	Liga ACB	5th	28–12	Third place			1 European League	4th	13–8
1996–97	1	Liga ACB	2nd	37–8	Quarterfinalist			2 EuroCup	C	15–4
1997–98	1	Liga ACB	3rd	29–13	Quarterfinalist			1 EuroLeague	GS	7–9
1998–99	1	Liga ACB	3rd	30–11	Semifinalist			1 EuroLeague	QF	11–9
1999–00	1	Liga ACB	1st	32–15	Quarterfinalist			1 EuroLeague	R16	10–8
2000–01	1	Liga ACB	2nd	33–12	Runner-up			1 Euroleague	QF	10–5
2001–02	1	Liga ACB	5th	26–13	Quarterfinalist			1 Euroleague	T16	12–8
2002–03	1	Liga ACB	10th	17–17	Quarterfinalist			1 Euroleague	RS	6–8
2003–04	1	Liga ACB	5th	21–17	Quarterfinalist			2 ULEB Cup	RU	12–5
2004–05	1	Liga ACB	1st	35–12	Runner-up	Supercopa	RU	1 Euroleague	T16	9–11
2005–06	1	Liga ACB	6th	20–18	Semifinalist	Supercopa	3rd	1 Euroleague	QF	12–11
2006–07	1	Liga ACB	1st	34–13	Runner-up			2 ULEB Cup	C	13–4
2007–08	1	Liga ACB	5th	29–7	Semifinalist	Supercopa	SF	1 Euroleague	T16	14–6
2008–09	1	Liga ACB	4th	26–12	Quarterfinalist			1 Euroleague	QF	12–8
2009–10	1	Liga ACB	3rd	31–11	Runner-up	Supercopa	RU	1 Euroleague	QF	12–8
2010–11	1	Liga ACB	3rd	29–11	Runner-up	Supercopa	SF	1 Euroleague	4th	14–9
2011–12	1	Liga ACB	2nd	33–13	Champion	Supercopa	SF	1 Euroleague	T16	12–4
2012–13	1	Liga ACB	1st	38–6	Quarterfinalist	Supercopa	C	1 Euroleague	RU	21–8
2013–14	1	Liga ACB	2nd	38–6	Champion	Supercopa	C	1 Euroleague	RU	25–6
2014–15	1	Liga ACB	1st	35–8	Champion	Supercopa	C	1 Euroleague	C	24–6
2015–16	1	Liga ACB	1st	37–8	Champion	Intercontinental Cup	C	1 Euroleague	QF	12–15
2015–16	1	Liga ACB	1st	37–8	Champion	Supercopa	SF	1 Euroleague	QF	12–15
2016–17	1	Liga ACB	2nd	31–11	Champion	Supercopa	SF	1 EuroLeague	4th	26–10
2017–18	1	Liga ACB	1st	38–5	Runner-up	Supercopa	SF	1 EuroLeague	C	24–12
2018–19	1	Liga ACB	1st	36–7	Runner-up	Supercopa	C	1 EuroLeague	3rd	26–9
2019–20	1	Liga ACB	5th	21–7	Champion	Supercopa	C	1 EuroLeague	– (Note: The season was cancelled due to the COVID-19 pandemic.)	22–6
2020–21	1	Liga ACB	2nd	38–5	Runner-up	Supercopa	C	1 EuroLeague	QF	22–17
2021–22	1	Liga ACB	1st	33–10	Runner-up	Supercopa	C	1 EuroLeague	RU	22–11
2022–23	1	Liga ACB	2nd	33–10	Semifinalist	Supercopa	C	1 EuroLeague	C	28–13
2023–24	1	Liga ACB	1st	36–6	Champion	Supercopa	C	1 EuroLeague	RU	31–8
2024–25	1	Liga ACB	1st	38–5	Runner-up	Supercopa	RU	1 EuroLeague	QF	22–18
2025–26	1	Liga ACB	5th	27–10	Runner-up	Supercopa	RU	1 EuroLeague	RU	28–16
2026–27	1	Liga ACB				EuroLeague SuperCup	C	1 EuroLeague		

== International record ==
Seasons	Achievement	Notes
EuroLeague
1957–58	Semi-finals	eliminated by Rīgas ASK, received a forfeit (2–0) in both games
1960–61	Semi-finals	eliminated by Rīgas ASK, 78–75 (W) in Paris and 45–66 (L) in Prague
1961–62	Final	lost to Dinamo Tbilisi 83–90 in the final (Geneva)
1962–63	Final	lost to CSKA Moscow, 86–69 (W) in Madrid and 74–91 (L) in Moscow in the double finals
1963–64	Champions	defeated Spartak ZJŠ Brno, 99–110 (L) in Brno and 84–64 (W) in Madrid in the double finals
1964–65	Champions	defeated CSKA Moscow, 81–88 (L) in Moscow and 76–62 (W) in Madrid in the double finals
1965–66	Quarter-final group stage	4th place in a group with Slavia Prague, Simmenthal Milano and Bell Mechelen
1966–67	Champions	defeated AŠK Olimpija 88–86 in the semi-final, defeated Simmenthal Milano 91–83 in the final of the Final Four in Madrid
1967–68	Champions	defeated Spartak ZJŠ Brno 98–95 in the final (Lyon)
1968–69	Final	lost to CSKA Moscow 99–103 in the final (Barcelona)
1969–70	Semi-finals	eliminated by Ignis Varèse, 86–90 (L) in Madrid and 73–108 (L) in Varese
1970–71	Semi-finals	eliminated by Ignis Varèse, 59–82 (L) in Varese and 74–66 (W) in Madrid
1971–72	Semi-finals	eliminated by Jugoplastika, 89–81 (W) in Madrid and 69–80 (L) in Split
1972–73	Quarter-finals	3rd place in a group with Simmenthal Milano, Crvena Zvezda and Maccabi Tel Aviv
1973–74	Champions	defeated Ignis Varèse 84–82 in the final (Nantes)
1974–75	Final	lost to Ignis Varèse 66–79 in the final (Antwerp)
1975–76	Final	lost to Mobilgirgi Varese 74–81 in the final (Geneva)
1976–77	Semi-final group stage	4th place in a group with Mobilgirgi Varese, Maccabi Tel Aviv, CSKA Moscow, Maes Pils Mechelen and Zbrojovka Brno
1977–78	Champions	defeated Mobilgirgi Varese 75–67 in the final (Munich)
1978–79	Semi-final group stage	4th place in a group with Emerson Varèse, Bosna, Maccabi Tel Aviv, Joventut Freixenet and Olympiacos
1979–80	Champions	defeated Maccabi Tel Aviv 89–85 in the final (West Berlin)
1980–81	Semi-final group stage	5th place in a group with Sinudyne Bologna, Maccabi Tel Aviv, Nashua Den Bosch, Bosna and CSKA Moscow
1982–83	Semi-final group stage	3rd place in a group with Ford Cantù, Billy Milano, CSKA Moscow, Maccabi Tel Aviv and Cibona
1984–85	Final	lost to Cibona 78–87 in the final (Athens)
1985–86	Semi-final group stage	4th place in a group with Cibona, Žalgiris, Simac Milano, Maccabi Tel Aviv and Limoges
1986–87	Semi-final group stage	6th place in a group with Tracer Milano, Maccabi Tel Aviv, Orthez, Zadar and Žalgiris
1992–93	Final Four	4th place in Athens, lost to Limoges 52–62 in the semi-final, lost to PAOK 70–76 in the 3rd place game
1993–94	Quarter-finals	eliminated 2–0 by 7up Joventut, 69–88 (L) in Barcelona and 67–71 (L) in Madrid
1994–95	Champions	defeated Limoges 62–49 in the semi-final, defeated Olympiacos 73–61 in the final of the Final Four in Zaragoza
1995–96	Final Four	4th place in Paris, lost to FC Barcelona 66–76 in the semi-final, lost to CSKA Moscow 73–74 in the 3rd place game
1998–99	Quarter-finals	eliminated 2–0 by Teamsystem Bologna, 63–90 (L) in Bologna and 65–76 (L) in Madrid
2000–01	Quarter-finals	eliminated 2–1 by Paf Wennington Bologna, 68–74 (L) in Bologna, 88–57 (W) in Madrid and 70–88 (L) in Bologna
2005–06	Quarter-finals	eliminated 2–1 by FC Barcelona, 58–72 (L) in Barcelona, 84–78 (W) in Madrid and 70–76 (L) in Barcelona
2008–09	Quarter-finals	eliminated 3–1 by Olympiacos, 79–88 (L) & 73–79 (L) in Piraeus, 71–63 (W) & 75–78 (L) in Madrid
2009–10	Quarter-finals	eliminated 3–1 by FC Barcelona, 61–68 (L) & 70–63 (W) in Barcelona, 73–84 (L) & 78–84 (L) in Madrid
2010–11	Final Four	4th place in Barcelona, lost to Maccabi Tel Aviv 63–82 in the semi-final, lost to Montepaschi Siena 62–80 in the 3rd place game
2012–13	Final	defeated FC Barcelona 74–67 in the semi-final, lost to Olympiacos 88–100 in the final of the Final Four in London
2013–14	Final	defeated FC Barcelona 100–62 in the semi-final, lost to Maccabi Tel Aviv 86–98 in the final of the Final Four in Milan
2014–15	Champions	defeated Fenerbahçe 96–87 in the semi-final, defeated Olympiacos 78–59 in the final of the Final Four in Madrid
2015–16	Quarter-finals	eliminated 3–0 by Fenerbahçe, 69–75 (L) & 78–110 (L) in Istanbul, 63–75 (L) in Madrid
2016–17	Final Four	4th place in Istanbul, lost to Fenerbahçe 75–84 in the semi-final, lost to CSKA Moscow 70–94 in the 3rd place game
2017–18	Champions	defeated CSKA Moscow 92–83 in the semi-final, defeated Fenerbahçe 85–80 in the final of the Final Four in Belgrade
2018–19	Final Four	3rd place in Vitoria-Gasteiz, lost to CSKA Moscow 90–95 in the semi-final, defeated Fenerbahçe 94–75 in the 3rd place game
2019–20	Regular season	The tournament was suspended and then cancelled due to the COVID-19 pandemic; Madrid was 2nd in the standings at the time of suspension
2020–21	Quarter-finals	eliminated 3–2 by Anadolu Efes, 63–90 (L) & 68–91 (L) in Istanbul, 80–76 (W) & 82–76 (W) in Madrid, 83–88 (L) in Istanbul
2021–22	Final	defeated FC Barcelona 86–83 in the semi-final, lost to Anadolu Efes 57–58 in the final of the Final Four in Belgrade
2022–23	Champions	defeated FC Barcelona 78–66 in the semi-final, defeated Olympiacos 79–78 in the final of the Final Four in Kaunas
2023–24	Final	defeated Olympiacos 87–76 in the semifinals, lost to Panathinaikos 80–95 in the final of the Final Four in Berlin
2024–25	Quarter-finals	eliminated 3–1 by Olympiacos, 72–84 (L) & 71–77 (L) in Piraeus, 80–72 (W) & 84–86 (L) in Madrid
Saporta Cup
1981–82	Final	lost to Cibona 96–95 in the final (Brussels)
1983–84	Champions	defeated Simac Milano 82–81 in the final of European Cup Winners' Cup in Ostend
1988–89	Champions	defeated Snaidero Caserta 117–113 in the final of European Cup Winners' Cup in Athens
1989–90	Final	lost to Knorr Bologna 74–79 in the final (Florence)
1991–92	Champions	defeated PAOK 65–63 in the final of European Cup in Nantes
1996–97	Champions	defeated Mash Verona 78–64 in the final of EuroCup in Nicosia
Korać Cup
1987–88	Champions	defeated Cibona, 102–89 (W) in Madrid, 93–94 (L) in Zagreb in the double finals of Korać Cup
1990–91	Final	lost to Clear Cantù, 71–73 (L) in Madrid, 93–95 (L) in Cucciago in the double finals of Korać Cup
Eurocup
2003–04	Final	lost to Hapoel Migdal 72–83 in the final (Charleroi)
2006–07	Champions	defeated Lietuvos Rytas 87–75 in the final of Eurocup in Charleroi

== Notable players ==
Players who are currently on the team are in boldface. Players who are still active, but in other team, are in italics.

Note: Flags indicate national team eligibility at FIBA-sanctioned events. Players may hold other non-FIBA nationalities not displayed.

Criteria

To appear in this section a player must have either:

- Set a club record or won an individual award while at the club
- Played at least one official international match for their national team at any time
- Played at least one official NBA match at any time.

- (Spain) **Alberto Abalde**
- (Spain) Izan Almansa
- (Spain) Carlos Alocén
- (Spain) Pablo Aguilar
- (Spain) Alberto Angulo
- (Spain) Lucio Angulo
- (Spain) José Miguel Antúnez
- (Spain) Jonathan Barreiro
- (Spain) José Biriukov
- (Spain) Wayne Brabender
- (Spain) Antonio Bueno
- (Spain) Carmelo Cabrera
- (Spain) Josep Cargol
- (Spain) Juan Antonio Corbalán
- (Spain) Dani Díez
- (Spain) Rudy Fernández
- (Spain) Jorge Garbajosa
- (Spain) **Usman Garuba**
- (Spain) Hugo González
- (Spain) Eduardo Hernández-Sonseca
- (Spain) Willy Hernangómez
- (Spain) Alberto Herreros
- (Spain) Serge Ibaka
- (Spain) Iker Iturbe
- (Spain) Pablo Laso
- (Spain) José Luis Llorente
- (Spain) **Sergio Llull**
- (Spain) Raúl López
- (Spain) Juan Manuel López Iturriaga
- (Spain) Clifford Luyk
- (Spain) Antonio Martín
- (Spain) Fernando Martín
- (Spain) Baba Miller
- (Spain) Nikola Mirotić
- (Spain) Juan Antonio Morales
- (Spain) Álex Mumbrú
- (Spain) Juan Núñez
- (Spain) Juan Antonio Orenga
- (Spain) **Jaime Pradilla**
- (Spain) Alfonso Reyes
- (Spain) Felipe Reyes
- (Spain) Emiliano Rodríguez
- (Spain) Sergio Rodríguez
- (Spain) Johnny Rogers
- (Spain) Fernando Romay
- (Spain) Nacho Romero
- (Spain) Rafael Rullán
- (Spain) Lolo Sainz
- (Spain) Ismael Santos
- (Spain) Lorenzo Sanz
- (Spain) Mike Smith
- (Spain) Carlos Suárez
- (Spain) Sergi Vidal
- (Spain) Enrique Villalobos
- (Spain) Santiago Yusta
- (Angola) Bruno Fernando
- (Argentina) **Facundo Campazzo**
- (Argentina) **Gabriel Deck**
- (Argentina) Nicolás Laprovíttola
- (Argentina) Andrés Nocioni
- (Argentina) Pablo Prigioni
- (Argentina) Juan Ignacio Sánchez
- (Argentina) Lucas Victoriano
- (Azerbaijan) Jaycee Carroll
- (Belgium) Axel Hervelle
- (Belgium) Jean-Marc Jaumin
- (Belgium) Éric Struelens
- (Belgium) Tomas Van Den Spiegel
- (Bosnia and Herzegovina) Mirza Delibašić
- (Bosnia and Herzegovina) Džanan Musa
- (Bosnia and Herzegovina) Nedžad Sinanović
- (Bosnia and Herzegovina) Ratko Varda
- (Brazil) Rafael Hettsheimeir
- (Brazil) Augusto Lima
- (Bulgaria) Filip Videnov
- (Canada) Xavier Rathan-Mayes
- (Canada) Trey Lyles
- (Cape Verde) **Edy Tavares**
- (Croatia) Damir Mulaomerović
- (Croatia) Bojan Bogdanović
- (Croatia) Dontaye Draper
- (Croatia) Mario Hezonja
- (Croatia) Dražen Petrović
- (Croatia) Mario Stojić
- (Croatia) Žan Tabak
- (Croatia) Marko Tomas
- (Croatia) Ante Tomić
- (Czech Republic) Jiří Zídek
- (Denmark) Mikkel Larsen
- (Dominican Republic) **Andrés Feliz**
- (Finland) **Mikael Jantunen**
- (France) Fabien Causeur
- (France) Petr Cornelie
- (France) Alain Digbeu
- (France) Mickaël Gelabale
- (France) Thomas Heurtel
- (France) **Timothé Luwawu-Cabarrot**
- (France) **Théo Maledon**
- (France) **Olivier Sarr**
- (France) Moustapha Sonko
- (France) Vincent Poirier
- (France) Guerschon Yabusele
- (Germany) David Krämer
- (United Kingdom) Andrew Betts
- (Greece) Ioannis Bourousis
- (Greece) Antonis Fotsis
- (Greece) Lazaros Papadopoulos
- (Greece) Michalis Pelekanos
- (Hungary) Ádám Hanga
- (Republic of Ireland) Pat Burke
- (Republic of Ireland) Jay Larrañaga
- (Israel) D'or Fischer
- (Israel) Alex Tyus
- (Italy) Stefano Attruia
- (Italy) **Gabriele Procida**
- (Italy) Matteo Spagnolo
- (Latvia) Kaspars Kambala
- (Lithuania) Arvydas Sabonis
- (Lithuania) Rimas Kurtinaitis
- (Lithuania) Darjuš Lavrinovič
- (Lithuania) Rimantas Kaukėnas
- (Lithuania) Martynas Pocius
- (Lithuania) Jonas Mačiulis
- (Mexico) Gustavo Ayón
- (Montenegro) Blagota Sekulić
- (Montenegro) Vladimir Dašić
- (Montenegro) Dino Radončić
- (Netherlands) Rolf van Rijn
- (North Macedonia) Jeremiah Massey
- (Poland) Maciej Lampe
- (Puerto Rico) Johnny Báez
- (Puerto Rico) José Ortiz
- (Puerto Rico) Toñín Casillas
- (Russia) Egor Dëmin
- (Russia) Mikhail Mikhailov
- (Senegal) Maurice Ndour
- (Serbia) Dejan Bodiroga
- (Serbia) Dražen Dalipagić
- (Serbia) Aleksandar Đorđević
- (Serbia) Marko Jarić
- (Serbia) Ognjen Kuzmić
- (Serbia) Nikola Lončar
- (Serbia) Igor Rakočević
- (Serbia) Zoran Savić
- (Serbia) Dragan Tarlać
- (Serbia) Novica Veličković
- (Serbia) Dušan Vukčević
- (Serbia) Tristan Vukčević
- (Slovenia) Mirza Begić
- (Slovenia) Luka Dončić
- (Slovenia) Klemen Prepelič
- (Slovenia) Marko Milič
- (Slovenia) Anthony Randolph
- (Sweden) Melwin Pantzar
- (Sweden) Jeffery Taylor
- (Tunisia) Salah Mejri
- (Turkey) Kerem Tunçeri
- (Turkey) Ömer Yurtseven
- (Ukraine) Alex Len
- (Ukraine) **Max Shulga**
- (United States) Miles Aiken
- (United States) Derrick Alston
- (United States) Morris Almond
- (United States) Michael Anderson
- (United States) Joe Arlauckas
- (United States) Tanoka Beard
- (United States) Elmer Bennett
- (United States) Louis Bullock
- (United States) Josh Fisher
- (United States) Travis Hansen
- (United States) Michael Hawkins
- (United States) Othello Hunter
- (United States) Brian Jackson
- (United States) Keith Jennings
- (United States) **Damian Jones**
- (United States) Jordan Mickey
- (United States) **Chuma Okeke**
- (United States) Chasson Randle
- (United States) Stanley Roberts
- (United States) Brent Scott
- (United States) Kyle Singler
- (United States) Charles Smith
- (United States) Dennis Smith Jr.
- (United States) Larry Spriggs
- (United States) Walter Szczerbiak
- (United States) Trey Thompkins
- (United States) Nigel Williams-Goss
- (Venezuela) Carl Herrera

=== Players in the NBA draft ===
*	Denotes player who has been selected for at least one All-Star Game and All-NBA Team
^{#}	Denotes player who has never appeared in an NBA regular-season or playoff game
^{~}	Denotes player who has been selected as Rookie of the Year

Position	Player	Year	Round	Pick	Drafted by
PF/C	(Spain) Fernando Martín	1985	2nd round	38th	New Jersey Nets
C	(United States) Stanley Roberts	1991	1st round	23rd	Orlando Magic
PG	(Spain) Raül López	2001	1st round	24th	Utah Jazz
PF/C	(Poland) Maciej Lampe	2003	2nd round	30th	New York Knicks
SF/PF	(France) Mickaël Gelabale	2005	2nd round	48th	Seattle SuperSonics
PF	(Belgium) Axel Hervelle^{#}	2005	2nd round	52nd	Denver Nuggets
PG/SG	(Spain) Sergio Llull^{#}	2009	2nd round	34th	Denver Nuggets
PF	(Spain) Nikola Mirotić	2011	1st round	23rd	Houston Rockets
SG/SF	(Slovenia) Luka Dončić^{*~}	2018	1st round	3rd	Atlanta Hawks
PF	(Spain) Usman Garuba	2021	1st round	23rd	Houston Rockets
SF/SG	(Spain) Hugo González	2025	1st round	28th	Boston Celtics

== Historical uniforms ==
1931 (Home)	2012–13 (Home)	2012–13 (Away)	2014–15 (Home)	2014–15 (Away)	2016–17 (Home)	2016–17 (Away)

== Matches against NBA teams ==
23 October 1988

Boston Celtics (United States)	111–96	(Spain) Real Madrid

(Spain) Palacio de Deportes, Madrid

22 October 1993

Phoenix Suns (United States)	145–115	(Spain) Real Madrid

(Germany) Olympiahalle, Munich

11 October 2007

Boxscore

Toronto Raptors (Canada)	103–104	(Spain) Real Madrid

(Spain) Palacio de Deportes, Madrid

8 October 2009

Boxscore

Utah Jazz (United States)	109–87	(Spain) Real Madrid

(Spain) Palacio de Deportes, Madrid

6 October 2012

Boxscore

Real Madrid (Spain)	93–105	(United States) Memphis Grizzlies

(United States) FedExForum, Memphis

8 October 2012

Boxscore

Real Madrid (Spain)	95–102	(Canada) Toronto Raptors

Air Canada Centre, Toronto

8 October 2015

Boxscore

Boston Celtics (United States)	111–96	(Spain) Real Madrid

(Spain) Barclaycard Center, Madrid

3 October 2016

Boxscore

Oklahoma City Thunder (United States)	137–142 (OT)	(Spain) Real Madrid

(Spain) Barclaycard Center, Madrid

10 October 2023

Boxscore

Dallas Mavericks (United States)	123–127	(Spain) Real Madrid

(Spain) WiZink Center, Madrid

== See also ==
- Real Madrid–FC Barcelona rivalry
- Real Madrid–Estudiantes rivalry
- 2007 NBA Europe Live Tour
- 2009 NBA Europe Live Tour

== Notes and references ==
Notes
