= 1964–65 FIBA European Champions Cup =

- League: FIBA European Champions Cup
- Sport: Basketball
- Top scorer: (Socialist Federal Republic of Yugoslavia) Radivoj Korać

Finals
- Champions: (Spain) Real Madrid (2nd title)
- Runners-up: (Soviet Union) CSKA Moscow

FIBA European Champions Cup seasons
- ← 1963–64 1965–66 →

The 1964–65 FIBA European Champions Cup was the eighth season of the European top-tier level professional basketball club competition FIBA European Champions Cup (now called EuroLeague). It was won by Real Madrid, for the second straight time. Real defeated CSKA Moscow in the two-legged EuroLeague Finals, after losing the first game in Moscow, 88–81, and winning the second game at Madrid, 62–76.

During the season, Radivoj Korać, a member of the Yugoslav League club OKK Beograd, set the EuroLeague's all-time single-game scoring record, including all games played since 1958, when he scored 99 points in a game versus the Swedish League club Alviks.

== Competition system ==
25 teams. European national domestic league champions, plus the then current FIBA European Champions Cup title holders only, playing in a tournament system. The Finals were a two-game home and away aggregate.

== First round ==
| Team 1 | Agg. | Team 2 | 1st leg | 2nd leg |
|---|---|---|---|---|
| ÍR (Iceland) | 134–64 | (Northern Ireland) Celtic | 71–17 | 63–47 |
| Central YMCA (England) | 106–165 | (France) ASVEL | 66–74 | 40–91 |
| Alemannia Aachen (West Germany) | 117–153 | (Hungary) Honvéd | 51–70 | 66–83 |
| ASFAR (Morocco) | 134–211 | (Italy) Ignis Varese | 76–99 | 58–112 |
| Etzella (Luxembourg) | 104–179 | (Belgium) Antwerpse | 52–80 | 52–99 |
| Maccabi Tel Aviv (Israel) | 127–131 | (Greece) AEK | 74–67 | 53–64 |
| Alvik (Sweden) | 155–149 | (Netherlands) The Wolves Amsterdam | 82–84 | 73–65 |
| Wiener (Austria) | 135–135* | (East Germany) Chemie Halle | 76–63 | 59–72 |
| Galatasaray (Turkey) | 126–161 | (Bulgaria) Lokomotiv Sofia | 53–70 | 73–91 |
| Helsingin Kisa-Toverit (Finland) | 205–115 | (Denmark) Gladsaxe Efterslægten | 127–53 | 78–62 |

*After a 135 aggregate drew, a third decisive game was held in which Chemie Halle won 59–63.

== Second round ==
| Team 1 | Agg. | Team 2 | 1st leg | 2nd leg |
|---|---|---|---|---|
| Honvéd (Hungary) | 140–141 | (Italy) Ignis Varese | 84–74 | 56–67 |
| ÍR (Iceland) | 61–158 | (France) ASVEL | 42–74 | 19–84 |
| Antwerpse (Belgium) | 141–157 | (Greece) AEK | 71–72 | 70–85 |
| Alvik (Sweden) | 147–291 | (Socialist Federal Republic of Yugoslavia) OKK Beograd | 90–136 | 57–155 |
| Chemie Halle (East Germany) | 142–155 | (Czechoslovakia) Spartak ZJŠ Brno | 76–82 | 66–73 |
| Lokomotiv Sofia (Bulgaria) | 133–143 | (Poland) Wisła Kraków | 79–61 | 54–82 |
| Helsingin Kisa-Toverit (Finland) | 151–206 | (Spain) Real Madrid | 100–109 | 51–97 |

Automatically qualified to the quarter-finals

- (Soviet Union) CSKA Moscow

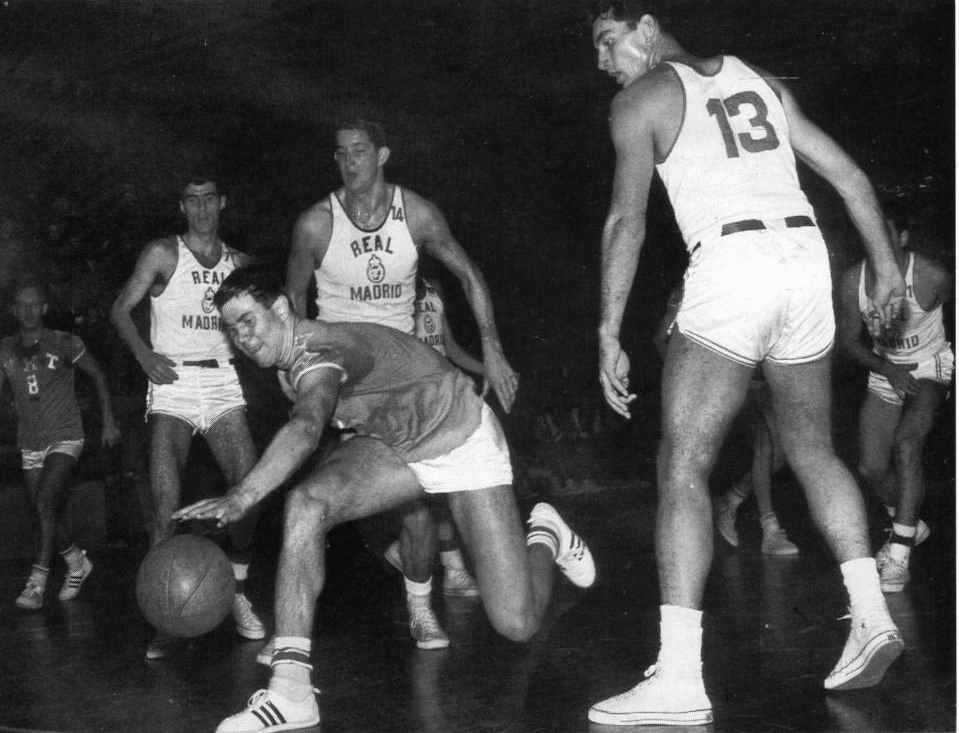
Helsingin Kisa-Toverit's Kari Liimo against Real Madrid

== Quarterfinals ==
| Team 1 | Agg. | Team 2 | 1st leg | 2nd leg |
|---|---|---|---|---|
| ASVEL (France) | 130–167 | (Spain) Real Madrid | 65–83 | 65–84 |
| AEK (Greece) | 169–179 | (Socialist Federal Republic of Yugoslavia) OKK Beograd | 85–78 | 84–101 |
| Ignis Varese (Italy) | 157–156 | (Czechoslovakia) Spartak ZJŠ Brno | 90–84 | 67–72 |
| Wisła Kraków (Poland) | 122–162 | (Soviet Union) CSKA Moscow | 62–68 | 60–94 |

== Semifinals ==
| Team 1 | Agg. | Team 2 | 1st leg | 2nd leg |
|---|---|---|---|---|
| Real Madrid (Spain) | 180–174 | (Socialist Federal Republic of Yugoslavia) OKK Beograd | 84–61 | 96–113 |
| Ignis Varese (Italy) | 124–127 | (Soviet Union) CSKA Moscow | 57–58 | 67–69 |

== Finals ==
| Team 1 | Agg. | Team 2 | 1st leg | 2nd leg |
|---|---|---|---|---|
| CSKA Moscow (Soviet Union) | 150–157 | (Spain) Real Madrid | 88–81 | 62–76 |

First leg Palace of Sports, Moscow;Attendance 15,000 (8 April 1965)

Second leg Frontón Vista Alegre, Madrid;Attendance 3,000 (13 April 1965)

1964–65 FIBA European Champions Cup
Champions

Real Madrid
2nd Title

== Awards ==
=== FIBA European Champions Cup Finals Top Scorer ===
- (Spain) Clifford Luyk ( (Spain) Real Madrid)
