= Ponava =

- Cadastral territory of Brno
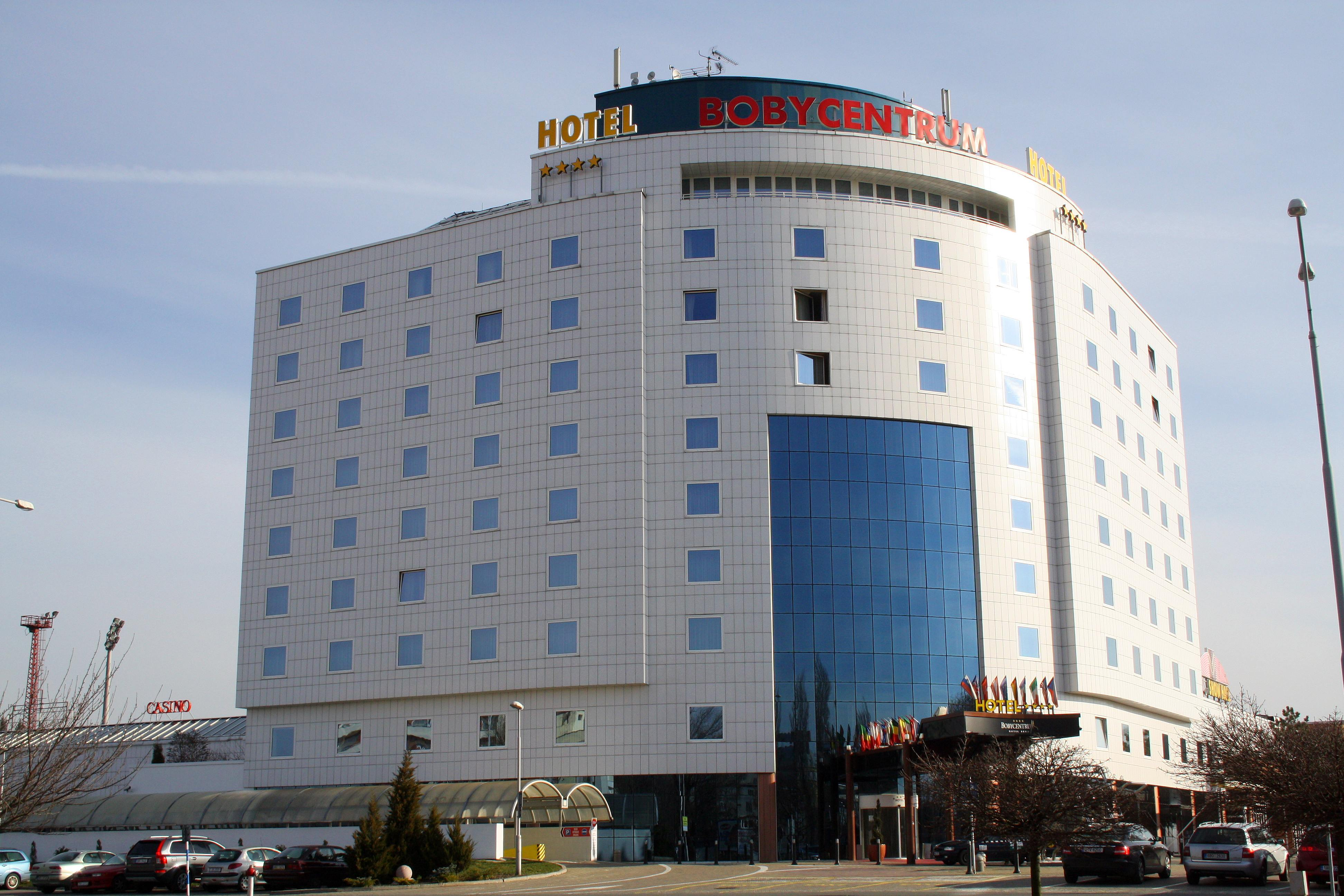
- Hotel Bobycentrum

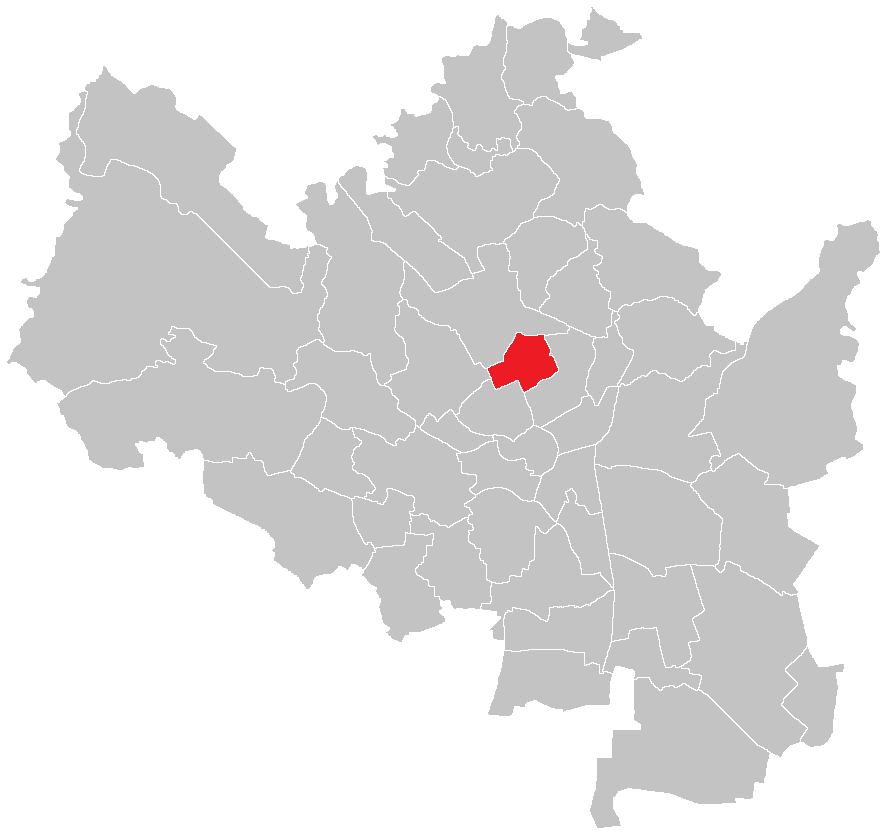
- Location of Ponava in Brno 49°12′44″N 16°35′59″E
- Country: Czech Republic
- Region: South Moravian Region
- District: Brno-City
- City: Brno
- City district: Brno-Královo Pole

Area
  - Total: 1.60 km^{2} (0.62 sq mi)

Population (2021)
  - Total: 6,817
  - Density: 4,260/km^{2} (11,000/sq mi)
- Time zone: UTC+1 (CET)
  - Summer (DST): UTC+2 (CEST)
- Postal code: 602 00

Ponava is a municipal part and cadastral territory of Brno-Královo Pole, a city district of Brno, Czech Republic. The cadastral territory has an area of 1.6 km^{2}. The territory of today's Ponava was annexed to Brno in parts in 1850 and 1919. Ponava has been part of Brno-Královo Pole since November 24, 1990. About 6,800 people live here.

== History ==
The cadastral territory of Ponava was created during the reambulation of Brno, from the years 1966–1969, consisting, among other things, of changes in the cadastral division of Brno, as well as adjustments to the borders of Brno with the surrounding municipalities. It was created from parts of the cadastral territories Velká Nová Ulice and Červená, Královo Pole, Dolní Cejl and Horní Cejl. Its lands were therefore annexed to Brno in two stages: on July 6, 1850 (parts of Ponava belonging at that time to the cadastres of Velká and Nová Ulice and Horní Cejl and Dolní Cejl and on April 16, 1919 (part of Ponava belonging at that time to the cadastre of Králova Pole ). However, before July 1, 1979, Ponava had a different western border than it has today: it also included the entire ZSJ Dřevařská (today part of the cadastral territory of Veveří), on the other hand, it did not include the western blocks bounded in the east by Klatovská, Šumavská and Chodská streets. The territory of Ponava within the boundaries of 1979 was divided until July 31, 1976 between the municipal districts of Brno V (most of the cadastre) and Brno III (the southeastern part of the cadastre with almost the entire campus of the Mendel University Arboretum, both stadiums, the campus of TJ Tesla Brno and Bobycentrum. From August 1, 1976 to November 23, 1990, the entire territory of present-day Ponava belonged to the Brno V municipal district.

== Geography ==
The border with the cadastral territory of Veveří passes through Štefániková, Hrnčířská and Kounicová streets, with the cadastral territory of Žabovřesky through Kounicová street, with the cadastral territory of Královo Pole through Tábor, Domažlická, Kartouzská and Antonína Macka streets, and with the cadastral territory of Černá Pole through Pionýrská, Drobného and Třída generála Píky streets.

=== Description ===
The entire district has a distinctly urban character, the important Štefánikova Street passes through it, along which tram service is provided between the city center and the districts of Královo Pole, Medlánky and Řečkovice. Places of interest in the district are, for example, the Botanical Garden and Arboretum of the Mendel University of Agriculture and Forestry in Brno or the Za Lužánkami football stadium. In the east of the district there is the large Královo Pole shopping center.

=== Territorial divisions ===
The cadastral territory of Ponava is further divided into 6 basic settlement units.

Basic settlement unit	Population		
Basic settlement unit	2011	2021	Change
Červený mlýn	0	0	+0%
Antonína Macka-Reissigova	468	438	-6.4%
Ptašínského	3,850	3,762	-2.3%
Skřivanova	1,686	1,656	-1.8%
Stadión	4	9	+125.0%
Staňkova	733	952	+29.9%

== Demographics ==
Historical population
Year	Pop.	±%
1970	10,866	—
1980	9,065	−16.6%
1991	8,009	−11.6%
2001	7,120	−11.1%
2011	6,741	−5.3%
2021	6,817	+1.1%
Source: Censuses

As of the 2021 census, the population is 6,817, up 1% from 6,741 in the 2011 census. The population peaked at 10,866 in 1970.
