= Zdeněk Konečný =

Czech basketball player (1936–2025)

Personal information
- Nationality: Czech
- Born: 13 August 1936 Olomouc, Czechoslovakia
- Died: 20 November 2025 (aged 89)

Sport
- Sport: Basketball

Zdeněk Konečný (13 August 1936 – 20 November 2025) was a Czech basketball player. He competed in the men's tournament at the 1960 Summer Olympics.

Konečný died on 20 November 2025, at the age of 89.
