= 1968 FIBA Intercontinental Cup =

- League: FIBA Intercontinental Cup
- Sport: Basketball
- Finals champions: (United States) Akron Goodyear Wingfoots
- Runners-up: (Spain) Real Madrid

FIBA Intercontinental Cup seasons
- ← 1967 FIBA Intercontinental Cup 1969 FIBA Intercontinental Cup →

The 1968 FIBA Intercontinental Cup was the 3rd edition of the FIBA Intercontinental Cup for men's basketball clubs. It took place at the Palestra and Spectrum in Philadelphia in January 1968. From the FIBA European Champions Cup participated Real Madrid and Simmenthal Milano, from the South American Club Championship participated Botafogo, and from the NABL participated the Akron Wingfoots.

== Participants ==
Continent	Teams	Clubs	
Europe	2	(Spain) Real Madrid	(Italy) Simmenthal Milano
North America	1	(United States) Akron Goodyear Wingfoots	
South America	1	(Brazil) Botafogo	

== Semifinals ==
Fewer than 1,000 fans turned out to the Palestra for the semi-final double header on January 4, 1968 which was seen as a loss to the sponsoring Amateur Athletic Union.

January 4, Palestra, Philadelphia

Team 1	Score	Team 2
Real Madrid (Spain)	93–84	(Italy) Simmenthal Milano
Akron Goodyear Wingfoots (United States)	84–52	(Brazil) Botafogo

== 3rd place game ==
January 6, Spectrum, Philadelphia

Team 1	Score	Team 2
Simmenthal Milano (Italy)	82–54	(Brazil) Botafogo

== Final ==
January 6

Akron Goodyear Wingfoots (United States)	105–73	(Spain) Real Madrid
Pts: Fowler 22; Rebs: King 7		Pts: Aiken 23; Rebs: Aiken 10

Spectrum, Philadelphia
Attendance: 3,104

1968 FIBA Intercontinental Cup Champions

Akron Goodyear Wingfoots
2nd title

== Final standings ==
	Team
	(United States) Akron Goodyear Wingfoots
Silver medal	(Spain) Real Madrid
Bronze medal	(Italy) Simmenthal Milano
4.	(Brazil) Botafogo
