= 1967 FIBA Intercontinental Cup =

- League: FIBA Intercontinental Cup
- Sport: Basketball
- Finals champions: (United States) Akron Goodyear Wingfoots
- Runners-up: (Italy) Ignis Varese

FIBA Intercontinental Cup seasons
- ← 1966 FIBA Intercontinental Cup 1968 FIBA Intercontinental Cup →

The 1967 FIBA Intercontinental Cup was the 2nd edition of the FIBA Intercontinental Cup for men's basketball clubs. It took place at Varese, Naples & Rome. From the FIBA European Champions Cup participated Simmenthal Milano, Slavia VŠ Praha, and Ignis Varese. From the South American Club Championship participated Corinthians, and from the NABL participated the Akron Wingfoots.

== Participants ==
Continent	Teams	Clubs		
Europe	3	(Italy) Ignis Varese	(Italy) Simmenthal Milano	(Czechoslovakia) Slavia VŠ Praha
North America	1	(United States) Akron Goodyear Wingfoots		
South America	1	(Brazil) Corinthians		

== Qualifying game ==
January 4, Naples

Team 1	Score	Team 2
Simmenthal Milano (Italy)	82–77	(Czechoslovakia) Slavia VŠ Praha

== Semi finals ==
January 5 & 6, Varese & Rome

Team 1	Score	Team 2
Akron Goodyear Wingfoots (United States)	57–52	(Brazil) Corinthians
Ignis Varese (Italy)	79–70	(Italy) Simmenthal Milano

== 3rd place game ==
January 7, Rome

Team 1	Score	Team 2
Simmenthal Milano (Italy)	90–89	(Brazil) Corinthians

== Final ==
January 7, Palazzo dello Sport, Rome

Team 1	Score	Team 2
Akron Goodyear Wingfoots (United States)	78–72	(Italy) Ignis Varese

1967 FIBA Intercontinental Cup Champions

Akron Goodyear Wingfoots
1st title

== Final standings ==
	Team
	(United States) Akron Goodyear Wingfoots
Silver medal	(Italy) Ignis Varèse
Bronze medal	(Italy) Simmenthal Milano
4.	(Brazil) Corinthians
5.	(Czechoslovakia) Slavia VŠ Praha
