= 1976–77 FIBA European Champions Cup =

- League: FIBA European Champions Cup
- Sport: Basketball

Final
- Champions: (Israel) Maccabi Elite Tel Aviv (1st title)
- Runners-up: (Italy) Mobilgirgi Varese

FIBA European Champions Cup seasons
- ← 1975–76 1977–78 →

The 1976–77 FIBA European Champions Cup was the 20th edition of the European top-tier level professional basketball club competition FIBA European Champions Cup (now called EuroLeague). The Final was held at the Pionir Hall, in Belgrade, Yugoslavia, on April 7, 1977. Maccabi Elite Tel Aviv defeated Mobilgirgi Varese, by a score of 78–77. This year saw a competition system change, as FIBA opted to replace classic knock-out round qualifications with a group stage.

== Competition system ==
- 24 teams (European national domestic league champions, plus the then current title holders), playing in a tournament system, entered a Quarterfinals group stage, divided into six groups that played a round-robin. The final standing was based on individual wins and defeats. In the case of a tie between two or more teams after the group stage, the following criteria were used to decide the final classification: 1) number of wins in one-to-one games between the teams; 2) basket average between the teams; 3) general basket average within the group
- The 6 group winners of the Quarterfinal Group Stage advanced to the Semifinal Group Stage, which was played as a single group under the same round-robin rules.
- The group winner and the runner-up of the Semifinal Group Stage qualified for the final, which was played at a predetermined venue.

== Quarterfinals group stage ==
Key to colors
Top place in each group advance to Semifinal group stage

=== Group A ===
	Team	Pld	Pts	W	L	PF	PA	PD
1.	(Italy) Mobilgirgi Varese	6	11	5	1	539	458	+81
2.	(West Germany) TuS 04 Leverkusen	6	10	4	2	558	489	+69
3.	(Turkey) Eczacıbaşı	6	9	3	3	484	528	-44
4.	(Luxembourg) T71 Sanichaufer	6	6	0	6	402	508	-106

=== Group B ===
	Team	Pld	Pts	W	L	PF	PA	PD
1.	(Spain) Real Madrid	6	12	6	0	763	499	+264
2.	(England) Sutton & Crystal Palace	6	9	3	3	568	596	-28
3.	(Switzerland) Federale	6	9	3	3	639	652	-13
4.	(Portugal) Sporting	6	6	0	6	517	740	-223

=== Group C ===
	Team	Pld	Pts	W	L	PF	PA	PD
1.	(Soviet Union) CSKA Moscow	6	12	6	0	700	487	+213
2.	(Sweden) Alvik	6	9	3	3	539	569	-30
3.	(Finland) Playhonka	6	8	2	4	472	556	-85
4.	(Poland) Wisła Kraków	6	7	1	5	495	594	-99

=== Group D ===
	Team	Pld	Pts	W	L	PF	PA	PD
1.	(Belgium) Maes Pils	6	11	5	1	445	393	+52
2.	(France) ASPO Tours	6	9	3	3	553	540	+13
3.	(Austria) Shopping Centre Wien	6	8	2	4	523	534	-11
4.	(Netherlands) Kinzo Amstelveen	6	8	2	4	488	542	-54

=== Group E ===
	Team	Pld	Pts	W	L	PF	PA	PD
1.	(Israel) Maccabi Elite Tel Aviv	6	11	5	1	542	470	+72
2.	(Italy) Sinudyne Bologna	6	9	3	3	496	482	+14
3.	(Romania) Dinamo București	6	8	2	4	505	509	-4
4.	(Greece) Olympiacos	6	8	2	4	449	531	-82

=== Group F ===
	Team	Pld	Pts	W	L	PF	PA	PD
1.	(Czechoslovakia) Spartak-Zbrojovka Brno	4	7	3	1	372	334	+138
2.	(Socialist Federal Republic of Yugoslavia) Partizan	4	6	2	2	400	376	+24
3.	(Bulgaria) Academic	4	5	1	3	336	398	-62
4.	(Egypt) Al-Gezira*	0	0	0	0	0	0	0

*Egyptian team Al-Gezira from Cairo was drawn into this group, but withdrew from the competition.

== Semifinals group stage ==
Key to colors
Top two advance to Final

	Team	Pld	Pts	W	L	PF	PA	PD
1.	(Italy) Mobilgirgi Varese	10	17	7	3	871	788	+83
2.	(Israel) Maccabi Elite Tel Aviv	10	16	6	4	698	699	-1
3.	(Soviet Union) CSKA Moscow	10	16	6	4	869	788	+81
4.	(Spain) Real Madrid	10	16	6	4	998	936	+62
5.	(Belgium) Maes Pils	10	15	5	5	743	839	-96
6.	(Czechoslovakia) Spartak-Zbrojovka Brno	10	10	0	10	740	869	-129

== Final ==
April 7, Pionir Hall, Belgrade

Team 1	Score	Team 2
Mobilgirgi Varese (Italy)	77–78	(Israel) Maccabi Elite Tel Aviv

1976–77 FIBA European Champions Cup
Champions

Maccabi Elite Tel Aviv
1st Title

== Awards ==
=== FIBA European Champions Cup Finals Top Scorer ===
- (Israel) Jim Boatwright ( (Israel) Maccabi Elite Tel Aviv)
