= 1969 FIBA Intercontinental Cup =

- League: FIBA Intercontinental Cup
- Sport: Basketball
- Finals champions: (United States) Akron Goodyear Wingfoots
- Runners-up: (Czechoslovakia) Spartak ZJŠ Brno

FIBA Intercontinental Cup seasons
- ← 1968 FIBA Intercontinental Cup 1970 FIBA Intercontinental Cup →

The 1969 FIBA Intercontinental Cup was the 4th edition of the FIBA Intercontinental Cup for men's basketball clubs. It took place at Macon, Georgia, United States. From the FIBA European Champions Cup participated Real Madrid and Spartak ZJŠ Brno, and from the South American Club Championship participated Sírio. Macon Movers took part from the NCAA, and from the NABL participated the Akron Goodyear Wingfoots.

== Participants ==
| Continent | Teams | Clubs | |
|---|---|---|---|
| Europe | 2 | (Spain) Real Madrid | (Czechoslovakia) Spartak ZJŠ Brno |
| North America | 2 | (United States) Akron Goodyear Wingfoots | (United States) Macon Movers |
| South America | 1 | (Brazil) Sírio | |

== Qualifying game ==
January 24, Macon Coliseum, Macon

| Team 1 | Score | Team 2 |
|---|---|---|
| Sírio (Brazil) | 73–68 | (United States) Macon Movers |

== Semi finals ==
January 25, Macon Coliseum, Macon

| Team 1 | Score | Team 2 |
|---|---|---|
| Spartak ZJŠ Brno (Czechoslovakia) | 84–77 | (Spain) Real Madrid |
| Akron Goodyear Wingfoots (United States) | 68–57 | (Brazil) Sírio |

== 3rd place game ==
January 26, Macon Coliseum, Macon

| Team 1 | Score | Team 2 |
|---|---|---|
| Sírio (Brazil) | 72–60 | (Spain) Real Madrid |

== Final ==
January 26, Macon Coliseum, Macon

| Team 1 | Score | Team 2 |
|---|---|---|
| Akron Goodyear Wingfoots (United States) | 84–71 | (Czechoslovakia) Spartak ZJŠ Brno |

1969 FIBA Intercontinental Cup Champions

Akron Goodyear Wingfoots
3rd title

== Final standings ==
| | Team |
|---|---|
| | (United States) Akron Goodyear Wingfoots |
| Silver medal | (Czechoslovakia) Spartak ZJŠ Brno |
| Bronze medal | (Brazil) Sírio |
| 4. | (Spain) Real Madrid |
| 5. | (United States) Macon Movers |
