= 1966 FIBA Intercontinental Cup =

- League: FIBA Intercontinental Cup
- Sport: Basketball
- Finals champions: (Italy) Ignis Varese
- Runners-up: (Brazil) Corinthians

FIBA Intercontinental Cup seasons
- ← 1965 FIBA Intercontinental Cup Test Tournament 1967 FIBA Intercontinental Cup →

The 1966 FIBA Intercontinental Cup was the 1st official edition of the FIBA Intercontinental Cup for men's basketball clubs. It took place at Real Madrid Pavilion, Madrid, Spain. From the FIBA European Champions Cup participated Real Madrid and Ignis Varese, from the South American Club Championship participated Corinthians, and from the NABL played the Chicago Jamaco Saints.

== Participants ==
Continent	Teams	Clubs	
Europe	2	(Spain) Real Madrid	(Italy) Ignis Varese
North America	1	(United States) Jamaco Saints	
South America	1	(Brazil) Corinthians	

== Semi finals ==
January 7, Real Madrid Pavilion, Madrid

Team 1	Score	Team 2
Real Madrid (Spain)	77–86	(Italy) Ignis Varese
Corinthians (Brazil)	69–62	(United States) Jamaco Saints

== 3rd place game ==
January 8, Real Madrid Pavilion, Madrid

Team 1	Score	Team 2
Real Madrid (Spain)	112–96	(United States) Jamaco Saints

== Final ==
January 9, Real Madrid Pavilion, Madrid

Team 1	Score	Team 2
Ignis Varese (Italy)	66–59	(Brazil) Corinthians

1966 FIBA Intercontinental Cup Champions

Ignis Varese
1st title

== Final standings ==
	Team
	(Italy) Ignis Varese
Silver medal	(Brazil) Corinthians
Bronze medal	(Spain) Real Madrid
4.	(United States) Jamaco Saints
