= Anenská Studánka =

- Municipality
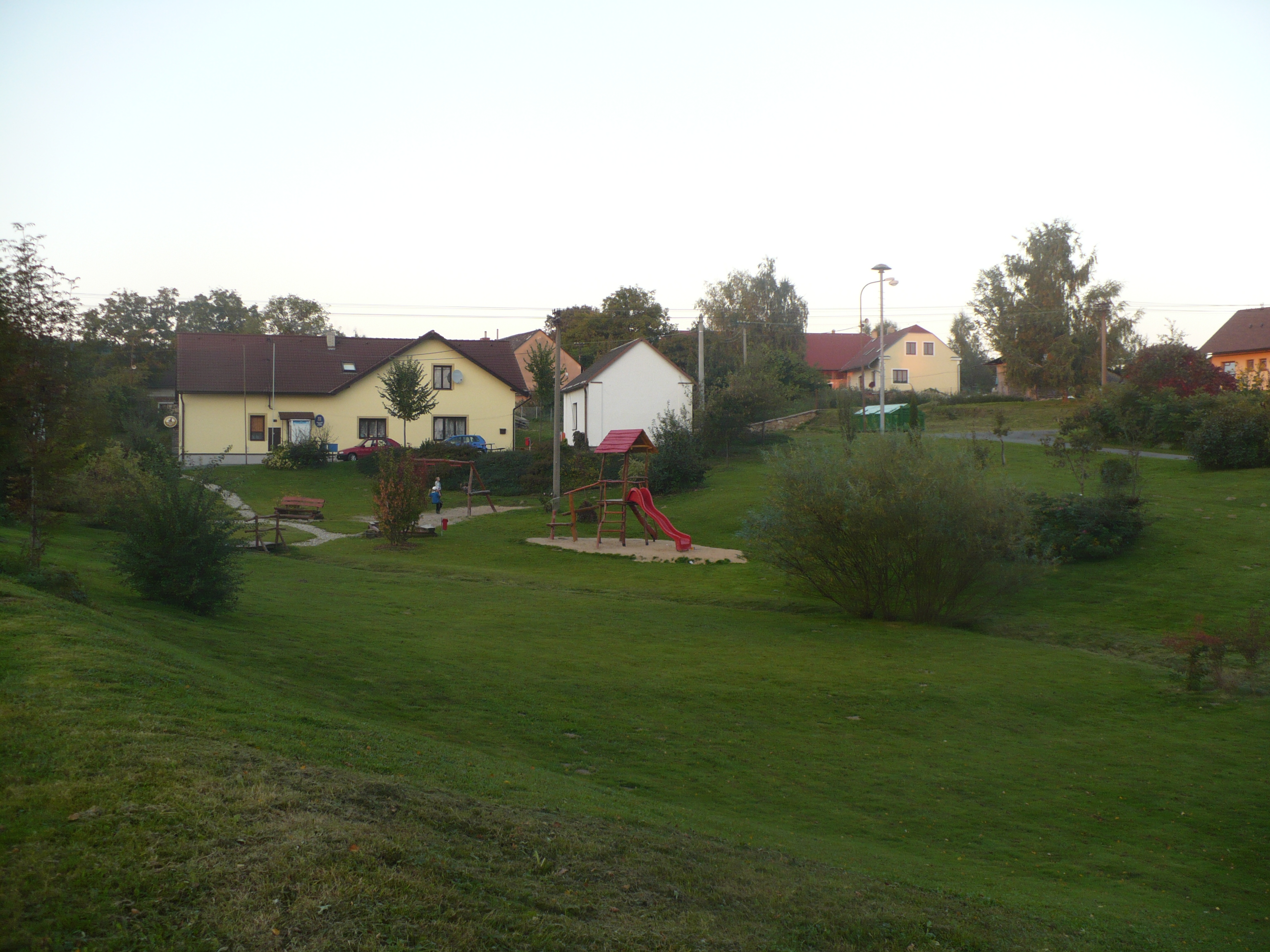
- Park in the centre of Anenská Studánka

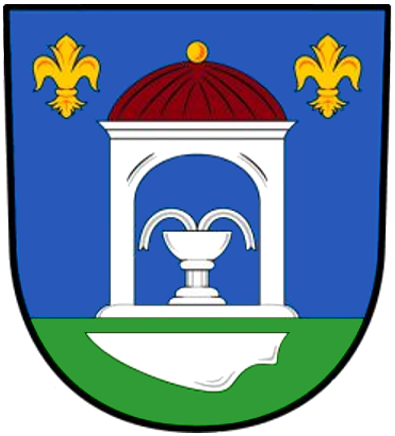
- Flag Coat of arms

- Location in the Czech Republic
- Coordinates: 49°50′59″N 16°32′25″E
- Country: Czech Republic
- Region: Pardubice
- District: Ústí nad Orlicí
- First mentioned: 1292

Area
  - Total: 7.91 km^{2} (3.05 sq mi)
- Elevation: 505 m (1,657 ft)

Population (2026-01-01)
  - Total: 193
  - Density: 24.4/km^{2} (63.2/sq mi)
- Time zone: UTC+1 (CET)
  - Summer (DST): UTC+2 (CEST)
- Postal code: 563 01
- Website: www.anenskastudanka.cz

Anenská Studánka (German: Königsfeld) is a municipality and village in Ústí nad Orlicí District in the Pardubice Region of the Czech Republic. It has about 200 inhabitants.

== Administrative division ==
Anenská Studánka consists of two municipal parts (in brackets population according to the 2021 census):

- Anenská Studánka (169)
- Helvíkov (15)

== Etymology ==
The name Anenská Studánka means "Anne's spring" in Czech.

== Geography ==
Anenská Studánka is located about 17 kilometres (11 mi) southeast of Ústí nad Orlicí and 57 km (35 mi) southeast of Pardubice. It lies in the Orlické Foothills. The highest point is at 641 m (2,103 ft) above sea level.

== History ==
The first written mention of Anenská Studánka is from 1292, when it was owned by the Zbraslav Monastery. Before 1678, a spa with a chapel was founded here. The spa was replaced by a new building in 1735, which was built by the then owners of Anenská Studánka, the Liechtenstein family.

== Demographics ==
Historical population

Year	Pop.	±%
1869	710	—
1880	697	−1.8%
1890	659	−5.5%
1900	658	−0.2%
1910	557	−15.3%

Year	Pop.	±%
1921	530	−4.8%
1930	534	+0.8%
1950	247	−53.7%
1961	311	+25.9%
1970	282	−9.3%

Year	Pop.	±%
1980	237	−16.0%
1991	196	−17.3%
2001	187	−4.6%
2011	205	+9.6%
2021	184	−10.2%

Source: Censuses

== Economy ==
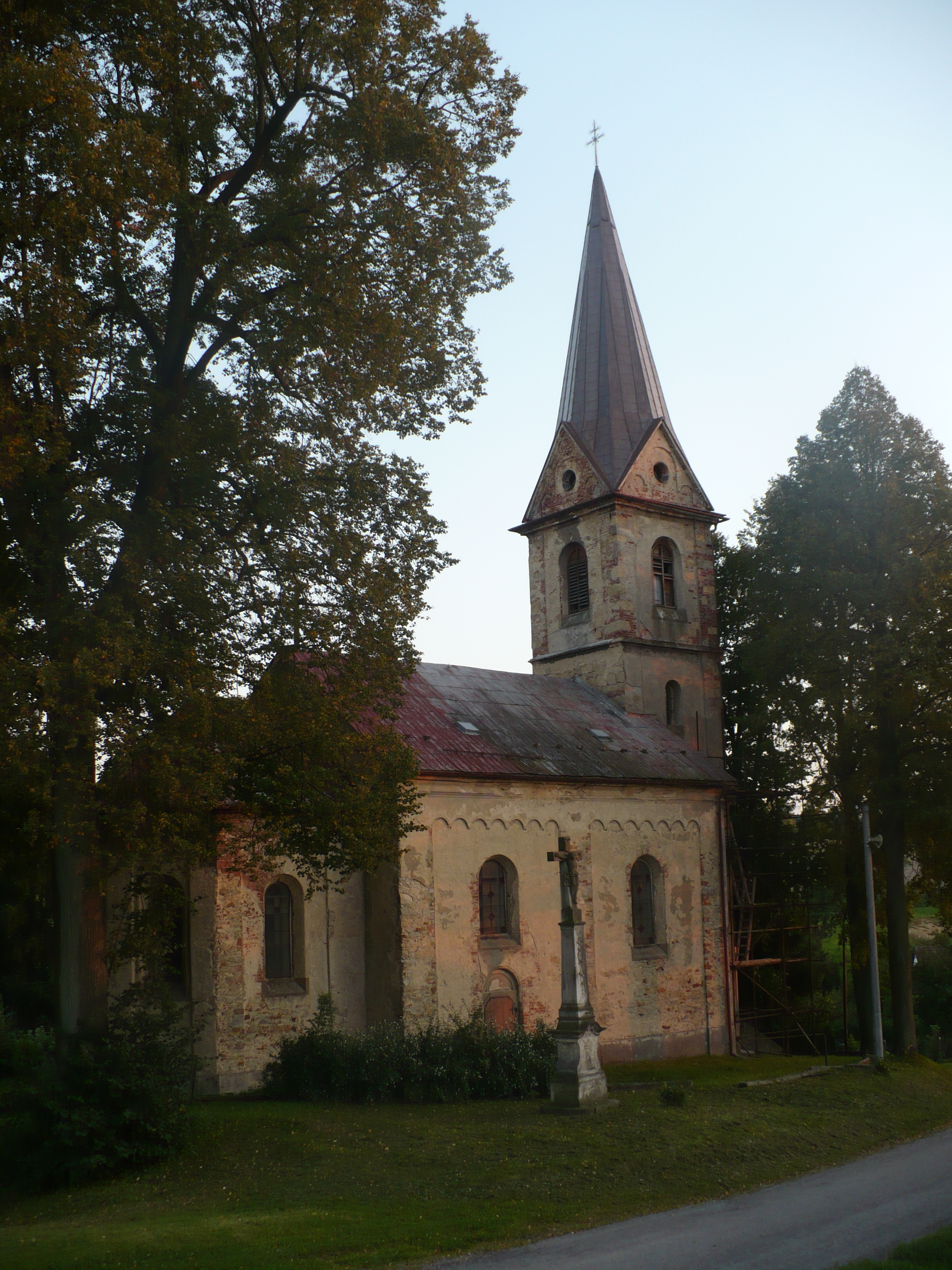
Church of Saint Lawrence

The building of the former spa today serves as a home for people with mental disabilities.

== Transport ==
There are no railways or major roads passing through the municipality.

== Sights ==
The main landmark of Anenská Studánka is the Church of Saint Lawrence. It was built in 1907, on the site of an old church from 1607.
