= Královo Pole indoor arena =

Sporting arena in Brno, Czech Republic

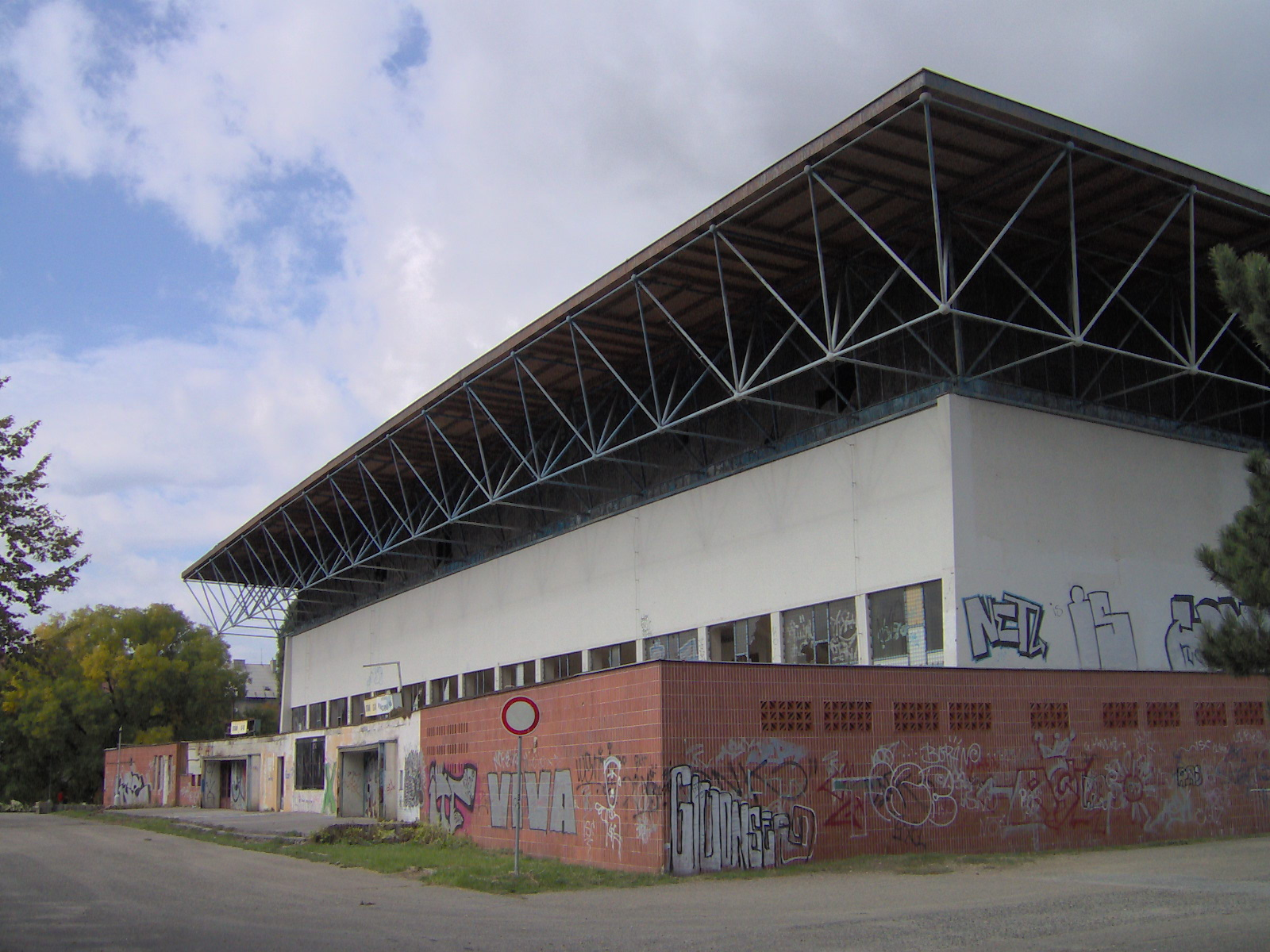
- Interactive map of Královo Pole indoor arena
- Location: Sportovní, Brno-Královo Pole, Brno, Czech Republic, 602 00
- Coordinates: 49°12′39.051″N 16°36′32.23″E
- Owner: Brno

Construction
- Opened: 1946
- Renovated: 1964
- Closed: 2000
- Demolished: 2008–2009

Tenants
- Spartak ZJŠ Brno (1947) HC Brno (1947–1993); HC Kometa Brno (1953–1986, 1988–1993, 1994–1998) HC Ytong Brno (1998–2000)

Královo Pole indoor arena was an indoor sporting arena located in Brno-Královo Pole, Brno, Czech Republic. The capacity of the arena was 12,000 people. It opened in 1947 and closed in 2000. Prior to its closure, it served as the primary arena for HC Kometa Brno.
