= Brno-Královo Pole =

- City district of Brno
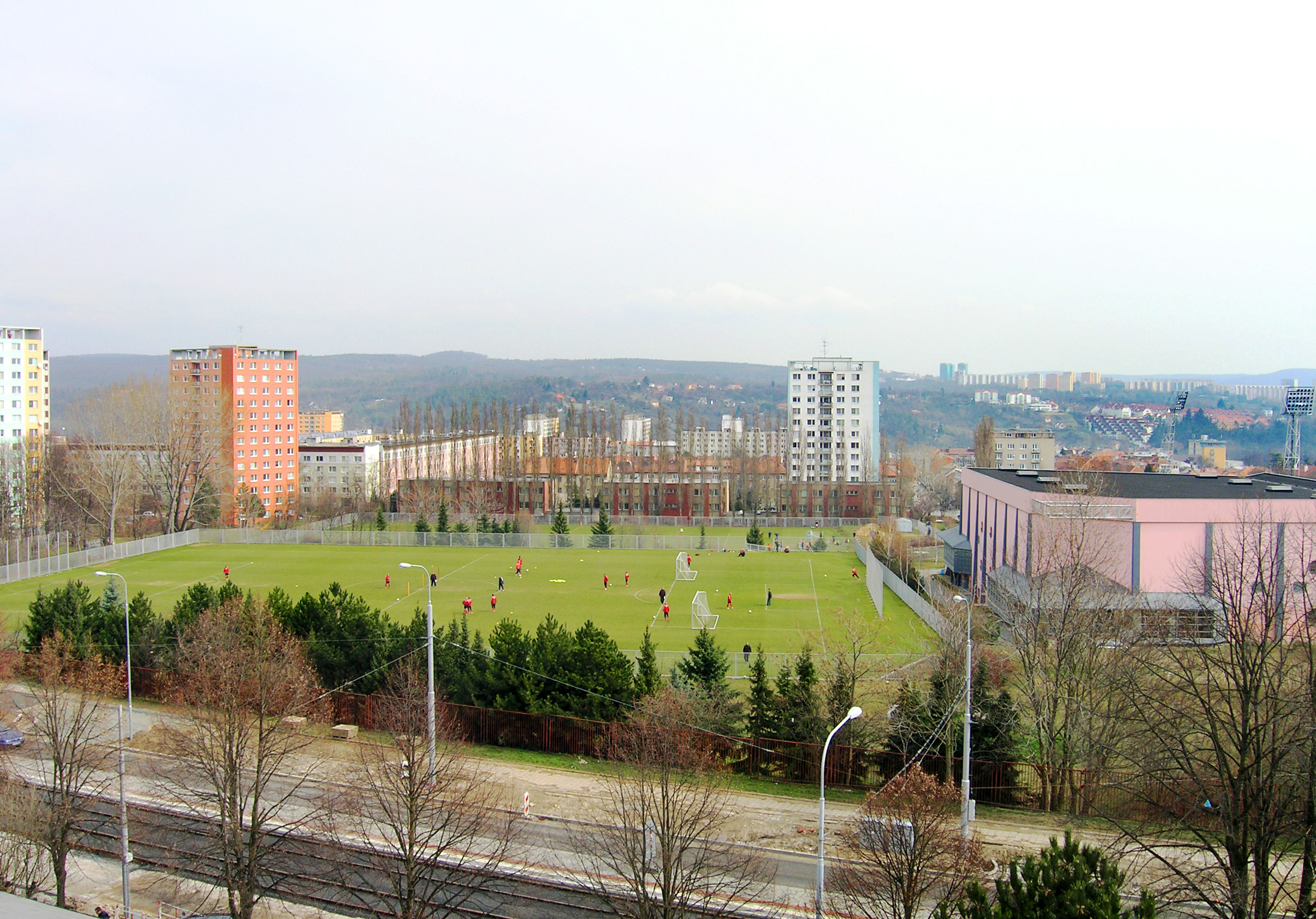
- Football on Herčíkova street

- Flag Coat of arms

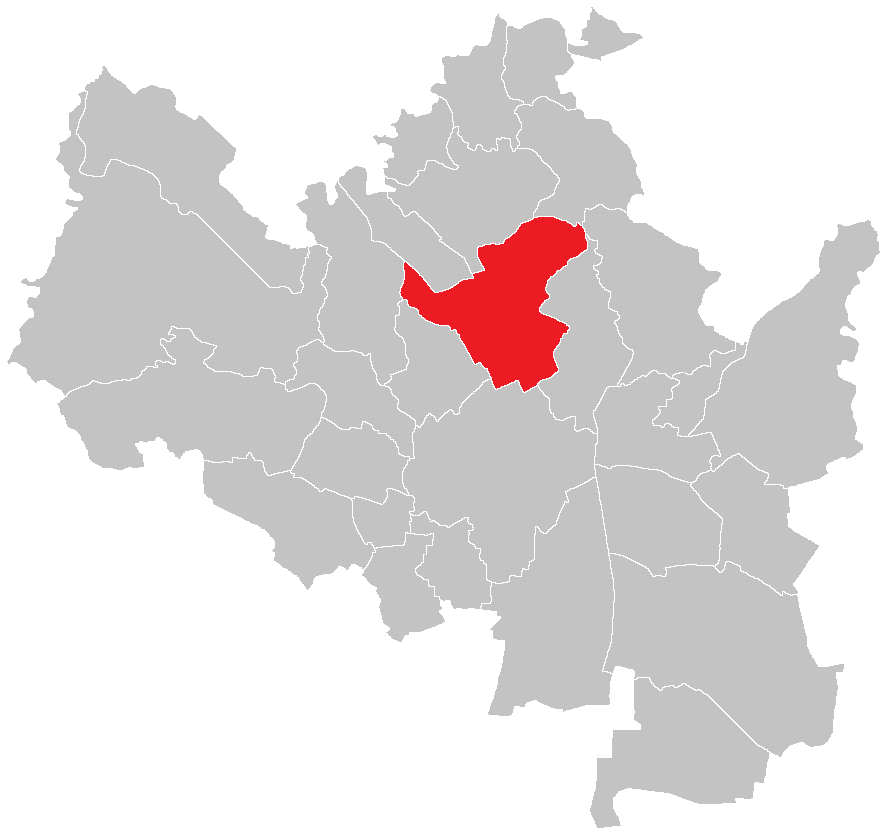
- Location of Brno-Královo Pole in Brno 49°13′25″N 16°35′40″E
- Country: Czech Republic
- Region: South Moravian Region
- District: Brno-City
- City: Brno
- Established: 24 November 1990

Government
  - Mayor: Andrea Pazderová (ODS)

Area
  - Total: 9.91 km^{2} (3.83 sq mi)

Population (2021)
  - Total: 30,155
  - Density: 3,040/km^{2} (7,880/sq mi)
- Time zone: UTC+1 (CET)
  - Summer (DST): UTC+2 (CEST)
- Postal code: 612 00
- Website: kralovopole.brno.cz

Brno-Královo Pole (German: Königsfeld, lit. 'Brno-King's Field') is a city district of Brno, the 2nd-largest city in the Czech Republic. It is made up of the cadastral territories of Královo Pole, Ponava and Sadová, as well as the northwestern corner of Černá Pole. The city district was established on 24 November 1990. It has a population of 30,155 as of 2021.

Formerly a village, it was annexed into Brno in 1919. A post office was opened 30 November 1868. For the purposes of the senate elections, the territory of the district is included in electoral district number 60 of Brno-City District.

The Brno-Královo Pole district has a distinctly urban character, but in the north-east of the district in the Sadová area, there are extensive forests and there is an important landscape element of the Zaječí potok valley.

The natural monument Medlánecké kopce with the Palackého vrch forest park extends to the northwest of the town. The main building of the Technical Museum in Brno is located in the city district. The famous Královo Pole Steel Works (Královopolská strojírna) is located in the east of the town, and the large shopping center Královo Pole is located south of it in Ponava.

== History ==
Until the first half of the 19th century, Královo Pole was a settlement, in 1844 it was promoted to a town. In 1869, the first horse-drawn carriage railway was put into operation in Královo Pole, and in 1890, the Královo Pole Engineering Works were founded. It was the establishment of engineering factories that contributed to rapid industrialization and promotion to a city in 1905. A major moment in the development of the town was the annexation of Královo Pole into Brno in 1919. Municipal schools also began to emerge rapidly, when the Slovanské náměstí 2 primary school was founded in 1913, and in 1920 across the park Gymnázium Slovanské náměstí 7.

At the end of the 1960s, during the second cadastral reform of Brno, in the territory of today's Brno-Královo Pole district, there were significant changes in the borders cadastral territories, which apply to the present day.

== Demographics ==
Historical population

| Year | Pop. | ±% |
|---|---|---|
| 1869 | 3,361 | — |
| 1880 | 4,427 | +31.7% |
| 1890 | 6,688 | +51.1% |
| 1900 | 10,228 | +52.9% |
| 1910 | 13,078 | +27.9% |

| Year | Pop. | ±% |
|---|---|---|
| 1921 | 15,179 | +16.1% |
| 1930 | 20,667 | +36.2% |
| 1950 | 22,847 | +10.5% |
| 1961 | 28,175 | +23.3% |
| 1970 | 33,747 | +19.8% |

| Year | Pop. | ±% |
|---|---|---|
| 1980 | 34,646 | +2.7% |
| 1991 | 29,386 | −15.2% |
| 2001 | 27,729 | −5.6% |
| 2011 | 28,674 | +3.4% |
| 2021 | 30,155 | +5.2% |

Source: Censuses

== Education ==
There are several universities on the territory of Královo Pole - the Veterinary University of Brno, the Technical University has several faculties here - the Faculty of Information Technology, the Faculty of Entrepreneurship and the Faculty of Mechanical Engineering, the Faculty of Electrical Engineering and Communication Technologies. The Faculty of Information Technologies of Masaryk University is also located here. Thanks to this, the Královo Pole district is a sought-after student district.

== Sports ==
The Královo Pole indoor arena was opened in 1947 and closed in 2000.

There is a stadium on Srbská street next to a housing estate, the Městský fotbalový stadion Srbská, officially ShipEx Arena since 2025. It was built in 1941, and can hold up to 10,785 people.
