= Mal Rush =

American basketball player (1909–1989)

Personal information
- Born: April 2, 1909 Graysville, Pennsylvania, U.S.
- Died: January 1, 1989 (aged 79) Akron, Ohio, U.S.
- Listed height: 6 ft 0 in (1.83 m)
- Listed weight: 170 lb (77 kg)

Career information
- High school: Salem (Salem, Ohio)
- College: Bethany (WV) (1928–1932)
- Position: Forward

Career history
- 1931–1938, 1941–1942: Akron Goodyear Wingfoots

Career highlights
- MBC champion (1937); NBL champion (1938)

Malcolm Warren Rush (April 2, 1909 – January 1, 1989) was an American professional basketball player. He played for the Akron Goodyear Wingfoots in the National Basketball League in 1937–38. He played college basketball, baseball, football, track, and tennis at Bethany College in Bethany, West Virginia. After his professional basketball career, Rush stayed with Goodyear Aerospace for over 40 more years.
