= List of California Golden Bears men's basketball head coaches =

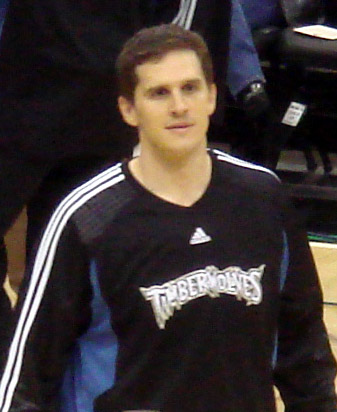
Mark Madsen, the current head coach of the California Golden Bears

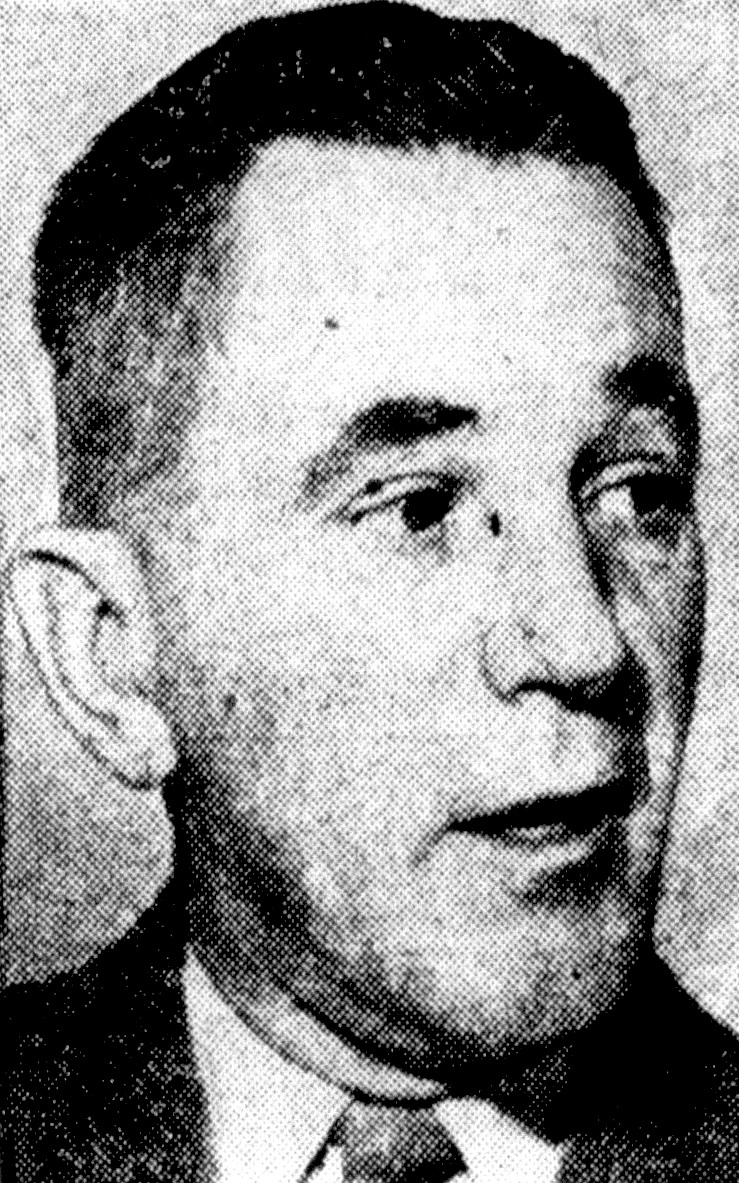
Nibs Price, the winningest head coach in Golden Bears men's basketball history

The following is a list of California Golden Bears men's basketball head coaches. There have been 19 head coaches of the Golden Bears in their 114-season history.

California's current head coach is Mark Madsen. He was hired as the Golden Bears' head coach in March 2023, replacing Mark Fox, who was fired after the 2022–23 season.

No.	Tenure	Coach	Years	Record	Pct.
–	1907–1915 (Note: California did not field a basketball team for the 1909–10 and 1910–11 seasons.)	No coach	6	21–0	1.000
1	1915–1916	Kilduff	1	11–5	.688
2	1916–1917	Ben Cherrington	1	15–1	.938
3	1917–1918	Walter Christie	1	8–2	.800
4	1918–1920	Bill Hollander	2	14–8	.636
5	1920–1924	Earl Wight	4	60–20	.750
6	1924–1954	Nibs Price	30	449–294	.604
7	1954–1960	Pete Newell	6	119–44	.730
8	1960–1968	Rene Herrerias	8	92–100	.479
9	1968–1972	Jim Padgett	4	52–53	.495
10	1972–1978	Dick Edwards	6	73–85	.462
11	1978–1985	Dick Kuchen	7	80–112	.417
12	1985–1993 (Note: Campanelli was fired on February 8, 1993. Todd Bozeman was named interim head coach for the remainder of the season.)	Lou Campanelli	8	123–108	.532
13	1993–1996 (Note: Bozeman was named permanent head coach in March of 1993, five weeks after being named interim coach.) (Note: California forfeited all games from the 1994–95 season, and 25 games from the 1995–96 season. Bozeman's on-court record is 63–35 (.643).)	Todd Bozeman	4	35–63	.357
14	1996–2008	Ben Braun	12	219–154	.587
15	2008–2014	Mike Montgomery	6	130–73	.640
16	2014–2017	Cuonzo Martin	3	62–39	.614
17	2017–2019	Wyking Jones	2	16–47	.254
18	2019–2023	Mark Fox	4	38–87	.304
19	2023–present	Mark Madsen	3	49–50	.495
Totals		19 coaches	115 seasons	1,677–1,345	.555
Records updated through end of 2025–26 season Source
