= List of California Golden Bears men's basketball seasons =

This is a list of seasons completed by the California Golden Bears men's college basketball team.

== Seasons ==
Record table
Season	Coach	Overall	Conference	Standing	Postseason
No coach (Independent) (1907–1915)
1907–08	No coach	1–0	—	—	—
1908–09	No coach	8–0	—	—	—
1911–12	No coach	2–0	—	—	—
1912–13	No coach	2–0	—	—	—
1913–14	No coach	2–0	—	—	—
1914–15	No coach	6–0	—	—	—
No coach:		21–0 (1.000)			
Pacific Coast Conference
Kilduff (PCC) (1915–1916)
1915–16	Patrick Kilduff	11–5	5–3	1st	—
Kilduff:		11–5 (.688)	5–3 (.625)		
Ben Cherrington (PCC) (1916–1917)
1916–17	Ben Cherrington	15–1	5–1	2nd	—
Ben Cherrington:		15–1 (.938)	5–1 (.833)		
Walter Christie (Independent) (1917–1918)
1917–18	Walter Christie	8–2	—	—	—
Walter Christie:		8–2 (.800)			
William Hollender (PCC) (1918–1920)
1918–19	William Hollender	6–3	2–2	3rd	—
1919–20	William Hollender	8–2	5–5	2nd	—
William Hollender:		14–8 (.636)	7–7 (.500)		
E. H. Wright (PCC) (1920–1924)
1920–21	E. H. Wright	15–4	8–3	T–1st	—
1921–22	E. H. Wright	19–6	10–4	3rd	—
1922–23	E. H. Wright	12–6	5–3	1st (South)	—
1923–24	E. H. Wright	14–4	5–3	1st (South)	—
E. H. Wright:		60–20 (.750)	28–13 (.683)		
Nibs Price (PCC) (1924–1954)
1924–25	Nibs Price	11–4	3–1	1st (South)	—
1925–26	Nibs Price	14–0	5–0	1st (South)	—
1926–27	Nibs Price	13–0	5–0	1st (South)	—
1927–28	Nibs Price	9–6	6–3	T–1st (South)	—
1928–29	Nibs Price	17–3	9–0	1st (South)	—
1929–30	Nibs Price	9–8	6–3	2nd (South)	—
1930–31	Nibs Price	12–10	6–3	1st (South)	—
1931–32	Nibs Price	16–8	8–3	1st (South)	—
1932–33	Nibs Price	18–7	8–3	2nd (South)	—
1933–34	Nibs Price	19–7	8–4	2nd (South)	—
1934–35	Nibs Price	11–14	5–7	2nd (South)	—
1935–36	Nibs Price	13–16	6–6	3rd (South)	—
1936–37	Nibs Price	17–10	4–8	3rd (South)	—
1937–38	Nibs Price	18–11	8–4	2nd (South)	—
1938–39	Nibs Price	24–8	9–3	T–1st (South)	—
1939–40	Nibs Price	15–17	5–7	3rd (South)	—
1940–41	Nibs Price	15–12	6–6	3rd (South)	—
1941–42	Nibs Price	11–19	4–8	3rd (South)	—
1942–43	Nibs Price	9–15	1–7	4th (South)	—
1943–44	Nibs Price	7–3	4–0	1st (South)	—
1944–45	Nibs Price	7–8	1–3	3rd (South)	—
1945–46	Nibs Price	30–6	11–1	1st (South)	NCAA Final Four
1946–47	Nibs Price	20–11	8–4	2nd (South)	—
1947–48	Nibs Price	25–9	11–1	1st (South)	—
1948–49	Nibs Price	14–19	1–11	4th (South)	—
1949–50	Nibs Price	10–17	4–8	3rd (South)	—
1950–51	Nibs Price	16–16	3–9	4th (South)	—
1951–52	Nibs Price	17–13	6–6	T–2nd (South)	—
1952–53	Nibs Price	15–10	9–3	1st (South)	—
1953–54	Nibs Price	17–7	6–6	3rd (South)	—
Nibs Price:		449–294 (.604)	176–128 (.579)		
Pete Newell (PCC/AAWU) (1954–1960)
1954–55	Pete Newell	9–16	1–11	4th (South)	
1955–56	Pete Newell	17–8	10–6	3rd	
1956–57	Pete Newell	21–5	14–2	1st	NCAA University Division Elite Eight
1957–58	Pete Newell	19–9	12–4	T–1st	NCAA University Division Elite Eight
1958–59	Pete Newell	25–4	14–2	1st	NCAA University Division Champion
Athletic Association of Western Universities
1959–60	Pete Newell	28–2	11–1	1st	NCAA University Division Runner-up
Pete Newell:		119–44 (.730)	62–26 (.705)		
Rene Herrerias (AAWU) (1960–1968)
1960–61	Rene Herrerias	13–9	5–7	4th	—
1961–62	Rene Herrerias	8–17	2–10	5th	—
1962–63	Rene Herrerias	13–11	4–8	5th	—
1963–64	Rene Herrerias	11–13	8–7	3rd	—
1964–65	Rene Herrerias	8–15	4–10	7th	—
1965–66	Rene Herrerias	9–16	4–10	7th	—
1966–67	Rene Herrerias	15–10	6–8	T–5th	—
1967–68	Rene Herrerias	15–9	7–7	4th	—
Rene Herrerias:		92–100 (.479)	40–67 (.374)		
Pac-8/10/12 Conference
Jim Padgett (Pac–8) (1968–1972)
1968–69	Jim Padgett	12–13	4–10	T–7th	—
1969–70	Jim Padgett	11–15	5–9	6th	—
1970–71	Jim Padgett	16–9	8–6	T–3rd	—
1971–72	Jim Padgett	13–16	6–8	5th	—
Jim Padgett:		52–53 (.495)	23–33 (.411)		
Dick Edwards (Pac–8) (1972–1978)
1972–73	Dick Edwards	11–15	4–10	7th	—
1973–74	Dick Edwards	9–17	3–11	T–7th	—
1974–75	Dick Edwards	17–9	7–7	4th	—
1975–76	Dick Edwards	13–13	5–9	T–6th	—
1976–77	Dick Edwards	12–15	7–7	6th	—
1977–78	Dick Edwards	11–16	4–10	7th	—
Dick Edwards:		73–85 (.462)	30–54 (.357)		
Dick Kuchen (Pac–10) (1978–1985)
1978–79	Dick Kuchen	6–21	4–14	10th	—
1979–80	Dick Kuchen	8–19	3–15	10th	—
1980–81	Dick Kuchen	13–14	5–13	T–8th	—
1981–82	Dick Kuchen	14–13	8–10	T–6th	—
1982–83	Dick Kuchen	14–14	7–11	T–8th	—
1983–84	Dick Kuchen	12–16	5–13	9th	—
1984–85	Dick Kuchen	13–15	5–13	T–8th	—
Dick Kuchen:		80–112 (.417)	37–89 (.294)		
Lou Campanelli (Pac–10) (1985–1993)
1985–86	Lou Campanelli	19–10	11–7	3rd	NIT First Round
1986–87	Lou Campanelli	20–15	10–8	T–3rd	NIT Quarterfinal
1987–88	Lou Campanelli	9–20	5–13	T–8th	—
1988–89	Lou Campanelli	20–13	10–8	5th	NIT Second Round
1989–90	Lou Campanelli	22–10	12–6	3rd	NCAA Division I Second Round
1990–91	Lou Campanelli	13–15	8–10	T–5th	—
1991–92	Lou Campanelli	10–18	4–14	9th	—
1992–93	Lou Campanelli; Todd Bozeman^{[Note A]}	21–9^{[Note A]}	12–6^{[Note A]}	2nd	NCAA Division I Sweet Sixteen
Lou Campanelli:		123–108 (.532)	64–71 (.474)		
Todd Bozeman (Pac–10) (1993–1996)
1993–94	Todd Bozeman	22–8	13–5	T–2nd	NCAA Division I First Round
1994–95	Todd Bozeman	13–14^{[Note B]}	5–13^{[Note B]}	T–8th	—
1995–96	Todd Bozeman	17–11^{[Note B]}	11–7^{[Note B]}	4th	NCAA Division I First Round
Todd Bozeman:		63–35^{[Note C]} (.643)	37–26^{[Note C]} (.587)		
Ben Braun (Pac–10) (1996–2008)
1996–97	Ben Braun	23–9	12–6	T–2nd	NCAA Division I Sweet Sixteen
1997–98	Ben Braun	12–15	8–10	T–5th	—
1998–99	Ben Braun	22–11	8–10	T–5th	NIT Champion
1999–00	Ben Braun	18–15	7–11	7th	NIT Quarterfinal
2000–01	Ben Braun	20–11	11–7	T–4th	NCAA Division I First Round
2001–02	Ben Braun	23–9	12–6	T–2nd	NCAA Division I Second Round
2002–03	Ben Braun	22–9	13–5	3rd	NCAA Division I Second Round
2003–04	Ben Braun	13–15	9–9	T–4th	—
2004–05	Ben Braun	13–16	6–12	T–8th	—
2005–06	Ben Braun	20–11	12–6	3rd	NCAA Division I First Round
2006–07	Ben Braun	16–17	6–12	8th	—
2007–08	Ben Braun	17–16	6–12	9th	NIT Second Round
Ben Braun:		219–154 (.587)	110–106 (.509)		
Mike Montgomery (Pac–10/Pac–12) (2008–2014)
2008–09	Mike Montgomery	22–11	11–7	T–3rd	NCAA Division I First Round
2009–10	Mike Montgomery	24–11	13–5	1st	NCAA Division I Second Round
2010–11	Mike Montgomery	18–15	10–8	T–4th	NIT Second Round
2011–12	Mike Montgomery	24–10	13–5	T–2nd	NCAA Division I First Round
2012–13	Mike Montgomery	21–12	12–6	T–2nd	NCAA Division I Third Round
2013–14	Mike Montgomery	21–14	10–8	T–3rd	NIT Quarterfinal
Mike Montgomery:		130–73 (.640)	69–39 (.639)		
Cuonzo Martin (Pac–12) (2014–2017)
2014–15	Cuonzo Martin	18–15	7–11	T–8th	–
2015–16	Cuonzo Martin	23–11	12–6	T–3rd	NCAA Division I First Round
2016–17	Cuonzo Martin	21–13	10–8	T–5th	NIT First Round
Cuonzo Martin:		62–39 (.614)	28–24 (.538)		
Wyking Jones (Pac–12) (2017–2019)
2017–18	Wyking Jones	8–24	2–16	12th	
2018–19	Wyking Jones	8–23	3–15	12th	
Wyking Jones:		16–47 (.254)	5–31 (.139)		
Mark Fox (Pac–12) (2019–2023)
2019–20	Mark Fox	14–18	7–11	T–8th	No postseason held
2020–21	Mark Fox	9–20	3–17	12th	
2021–22	Mark Fox	12–20	5–15	10th	
2022–23	Mark Fox	3–29	2–18	12th	
Mark Fox:		38–87 (.304)	17–61 (.250)		
Mark Madsen (Pac–12) (2023–2024)
2023–24	Mark Madsen	13–19	9–11	T–6th	
Atlantic Coast Conference
Mark Madsen (ACC) (2024–present)
2024–25	Mark Madsen	14–19	6–14	15th	
2025–26	Mark Madsen	22–12	9–9	T–9th	NIT Second Round
Mark Madsen:		49–50 (.495)	24–34 (.414)		
Total:					
National champion Postseason invitational champion Conference regular season champion Conference regular season and conference tournament champion Division regular season champion Division regular season and conference tournament champion Conference tournament champion

^A.Bozeman was named acting head coach in February 1993 following the firing of Lou Campanelli; California credits the first 17 games of the regular season to Campanelli, who went 10–7 and 4–5 in conference. The final 13 games (including the NCAA Tournament) were credited to Bozeman, who went 11–2 and 8–1 in conference.
^B.Entire 1994–95 season and all but two games of 1995–96 season were forfeited by NCAA after it was discovered that Jelani Gardner was ineligible. 1996 NCAA Tournament appearance was vacated. Cal's adjusted records are 0–27 (0–18 Pac–10) 1994–95, and 2–26 (2–16 Pac–10) in 1995–96.
^C.California's adjusted record under Bozeman was 35–63 (23–41 Pac–10).
