= Bob Presley =

American basketball player (1946-1975)

Personal information
- Born: April 30, 1946 Birmingham, Alabama, U.S.
- Died: March 25, 1975 (aged 28) Portland, Oregon, U.S.
- Listed height: 6 ft 10 in (2.08 m)

Career information
- High school: Northern (Detroit, Michigan)
- College: Mt. San Jacinto (1966–1967); California (1967–1969)
- NBA draft: 1969: 11th round, 143rd overall pick
- Drafted by: Milwaukee Bucks
- Playing career: 1971–1975
- Position: Center

Career history
- 1971: Meralco
- 1973–1974: Richmond Believers
- 1974: San Francisco Sugar Hills
- 1974–1975: Martinez Muirs

Career highlights
- MICAA champion (1971 Open); Second-team All-AAWU (1968); Desert Conference Most Valuable Player (1967); First-team All-Desert Conference (1967)
- Stats at Basketball Reference

Robert Nathaniel Presley (April 30, 1946 – March 25, 1975) was an American professional basketball player. He played college basketball for the California Golden Bears and was an eleventh round selection by the Milwaukee Bucks in the 1969 NBA draft. Presley played professionally in the Philippines, Belgium and in the American semi-professional Western Basketball Association (WBA).

Presley was raised in Detroit, Michigan, where he attended three high schools and struggled academically despite having potential as a basketball player. Presley was sent to California where he benefitted from alleviated academic standards and graduated from high school. He became eligible to attend Mt. San Jacinto College where he starred on the basketball team as a sophomore. Presley transferred to play for the Golden Bears from 1967 to 1969. His suspension and subsequent reinstatement in 1968 sparked racial tension on the team and resulted in the resignations of head coach Rene Herrerias and athletic director Pete Newell. Presley was expected to start his professional career with the Denver Rockets of the American Basketball Association (ABA) in 1969 but quit the team before appearing in a game. After his release from prison for grand theft in 1971, Presley aspired to play in the NBA and toiled in minor leagues.

Presley's personal life was marked by turmoil and poverty. He struggled to make an adequate income from his basketball career and failed in other business ventures. After experiencing several mental breakdowns in his pursuit for a successful basketball career, Presley drowned himself in the Willamette River in Portland, Oregon.

== Early life ==
Presley was born on April 30, 1946, in Birmingham, Alabama. His parents had wanted to name him Nathaniel Robert but the hospital where he was born reversed the names on his birth certificate. Presley's family lived in poverty in Birmingham so they moved to Detroit. They lived in the attic of a relative's house, slept on the floor and used a "slop jar" because they did not have access to a bathroom. Presley's father worked late hours on the assembly line at the Ford Motor Company. His childhood was permeated by hunger and inattention.

Presley attended the Moore School for Boys which was a predominantly black institution that was established for troubled children. Moore did not have an interscholastic sports program so Presley transferred to Pershing High School when he was aged 16 because of his potential as a basketball player. Pershing basketball coach Will Robinson attempted to keep Presley interested in pursuing his education by giving him lunch money and driving him to school but he was suspended after six weeks due to truancy. Presley later stated that "Pershing was 97% white, and I couldn't make the adjustment."

Presley spent the rest of the year at a job where he reconditioned used cars. He enrolled at Northern High School as a sophomore in 1963 and played as a reserve center on the basketball team. Presley and Northern made the Class A championship game in 1964 where they lost to Benton Harbor High School. In October 1964, Presley arrived at Northern while intoxicated and punched a teacher, starting a brawl that took four teachers and multiple policemen to control him. He was expelled from Northern and spent the rest of the year playing basketball on neighborhood courts with local players including Bill Buntin and Mel Daniels.

Presley had formed a connection with George Gaddy, a physical education instructor and manager of a local sports club for underprivileged children, during his attendance at Moore. Gaddy was involved in an operation that helped black athletes with poor grades gain enrollment at colleges so they could participate in intercollegiate athletics; Sports Illustrated compared the scheme to the Underground Railroad. Gaddy helped Presley to enroll at Salinas High School in northern California where he completed his junior year. He then enrolled at both Mt. San Jacinto College (which, as a California junior college, only required students to be 18 years old) and Banning High School where he achieved his high school diploma at the age of 20.

== College career ==
=== Mt. San Jacinto Eagles (1966–1967) ===
Presley returned to Mt. San Jacinto, where he played on the Eagles basketball team as a sophomore. The Eagles achieved a 25–5 record, and won the Desert Conference championship. Presley averaged 22 points per game and was selected as the most valuable player of the Desert Conference.

=== California Golden Bears (1967–1969) ===
==== Junior season ====
Presley was recruited to play for the California Golden Bears at the University of California, Berkeley. He had only achieved a C-plus average with his grades at Mt. San Jacinto but was eligible for entrance under a Californian scheme that allowed 2% of undergraduates to be admitted at a level below the usual academic requirements. Presley submitted a letter of intent to play for the Golden Bears in April 1967. He was expected "to become one of the best centers in the country" with the Golden Bears.

In the first 12 games of the 1967–68 season, Presley averaged a team-leading 22.2 points and 16.4 rebounds per game. A professional scout noted that, "next to Lew Alcindor, [Presley] is the best big man in the nation."

===== Suspension and protest =====
On January 18, 1968, Golden Bears head coach Rene Herrerias announced that Presley was suspended indefinitely but did not elaborate on the reason. A California athletic department source stated that the suspension was because of "rule violations". On January 20, Herrerias reinstated Presley to the team and again declined to give reasoning. On January 22, a team meeting occurred where the black players begged off and sided with Presley. Later that day, 11 white players and a manager of the Golden Bears basketball team resigned in support of Herrerias after allegations that administrative pressure was invoked to have Presley reinstated.

On January 23, Presley appeared alongside a group representing black athletes at the University of California, Berkeley who made demands that California fire Herrerias and Golden Bears football assistant coaches Bill Dutton and Joe Marvin "for reasons of their inability or unwillingness to relate to Black Athletes." They also declared that black athletes at the university had been subjected to derogatory comments because of their appearance, had to find housing on their own and received poor academic counselling because of an assumption they lacked intelligence. Presley stated that he was "shocked" at the action of the white players quitting the team and claimed that he did not think Herrerias was "qualified to coach." He also alleged that he was suspended because he refused to get a haircut; this was denied by both Herrerias and California athletic director Pete Newell. Presley was one of the first collegiate athletes who donned an afro; he would maintain for the rest of his life that his refusal to cut it was the reason for his suspension. The 11 players responded to the black athletes' demands with a statement on January 23 that urged "all team members, both black and white, be treated equally and fairly."

On January 24, Presley and all members of the Golden Bears returned to practice. The 11 players had relented after they had a conference with Herrerias where he confirmed that he made the decision to reinstate Presley. On February 2, Presley appeared in his first game with the Golden Bears since his suspension where a team spokesman observed there was no sign of the short-lived racial rebellion. On February 10, Presley was returned to the Golden Bears' starting line-up. Presley finished the season with averages of 18.1 points and 13.8 rebounds per game. He set a program record with 27 rebounds in a game against the Saint Mary's Gaels. Presley was selected to the All-Athletic Association of Western Universities (AAWU) second-team in 1968.

In March 1968, Newell resigned as California athletic director; the Los Angeles Times alleged that it was the result of the Presley scandal and made Newell "the first casualty of racial unrest in college sports." On April 11, Herrerias resigned as head coach and stated that the black protest was a contribution but not "the sole factor" in his desire to leave. Presley announced that Herrerias' resignation was "a great thing" as he had been contemplating not returning to the basketball team if Herrerias was to stay. Herrerias was replaced by freshman coach Jim Padgett.

==== Senior season ====
In a November 1968 interview, Presley stated: "All the ill feelings from last year are gone, because the causes are gone." He praised Padgett for his coaching methods that utilised Presley as the focal point of the team. He averaged a team-high 10.4 rebounds but the Golden Bears languished to a 12–13 record during the 1968–69 season.

== Professional career ==
On April 15, 1969, Presley was selected by the Denver Rockets of the American Basketball Association (ABA) in the second round of the 1969 ABA draft. On April 26, he signed a three-year contract with the Rockets. Bill Ringsby, the Rockets president, stated that the team considered Presley "a fantastic player who is destined to become a superstar." On May 7, Presley was also selected by the Milwaukee Bucks in the 11th round of the 1969 National Basketball Association (NBA) draft.

On September 23, 1969, Presley participated in a workout with the Rockets and then left the team training camp with no explanation. Head coach John McLendon did not speculate on why Presley had left but admitted that he had criticised Presley for lagging. McLendon claimed that Presley would be the sixth center in his line-up and was unlikely to make the team if he stayed. A Rockets spokesman stated: "we may have to write it off as a bad investment. I don't think management is too concerned right now." In a 1971 interview, Presley claimed that he left the team because they refused to pay his bonus and McLendon enforced an intensive training program. Presley's contract with the Rockets meant that he could not play for another team in either the ABA or NBA without additional action by the team. Using the $10,000 that he received by showing up to Rockets training camp, Presley briefly moved to Europe before he returned to the United States in October 1969.

On November 13, 1969, Presley was jailed on charges that he orchestrated an alleged traveller's cheque fraud in Berkeley, California. In December, he was charged with grand theft while charges of conspiracy and fraudulent use of checks were dropped. On August 19, 1970, Presley pleaded guilty to grand theft. On September 23, Presley was sentenced to six months imprisonment.

In 1971, Presley played for the Meralco Kilowatts in the Philippines. Playing alongside Robert Jaworski and Alberto Reynoso, the team won the Manila Industrial and Commercial Athletic Association (MICAA) championship. Presley returned to the United States and contacted Bob Bass who had drafted him on the Rockets; Bass suggested that he join him on the Miami Floridians of the ABA. Presley signed with the Floridians in August 1971. On October 4, Presley was the final player cut by the Floridians before the start of the 1971–72 ABA season. He returned to the Philippines for the 1972 season and then had a short playing stint in Belgium.

In 1973, Presley joined the Richmond Believers of the Western Basketball Association (WBA). The team folded in January 1974, and Presley moved to the San Francisco Sugar Hills for the remainder of the season. In 1974, he unsuccessfully tried out for the International Basketball Association. He returned to the WBA where he joined the Martinez Muirs for the 1974–75 season. He was paid $50 per weekend to play for the Muirs. Presley led the WBA with 13.0 rebounds per game while his 20.6 points ranked fourth best.

In a March 1975 interview, Presley lamented how his professional career had unfolded and credited his problems to his suspension at California. He believed that "the system won't let [him] play." Presley stated: "I'm going to give it one more year because I'm still motivated enough to feel I can make it, I would do a lot of things different if I had the chance again but it doesn't do any good to look back."

== Personal life ==
Presley was married but experienced a sadomasochistic relationship with his wife. Before their marriage, he had convinced her to become a prostitute so that he could work as her pimp. Presley attempted to run a bar and drive-in restaurant which both failed as business ventures. He was unable to keep other jobs which friends helped him to attain. Presley's wife was the sole money earner in their relationship and Presley was primarily relegated to working as a homemaker. His wife ultimately left him in 1975. Presley worked as a janitor to supplement his income while playing for the Muirs.

At the conclusion of the WBA season, Presley experienced a mental breakdown. In March 1975, Presley went to the Northwestern United States to seek an opportunity with the Seattle SuperSonics or Portland Trail Blazers of the NBA. His Muirs head coach, Dale Hall, attempted to arrange a tryout with the SuperSonics. Presley attended a SuperSonics game where he directed abusive remarks at rookie center Tommy Burleson and had to be evicted from the locker room by head coach Bill Russell.

== Death ==
The day after his SuperSonics confrontation, Presley travelled to Portland, Oregon. He lodged that night with a couple where he had another mental breakdown, wore a skirt and called himself "the wife" in his relationship. A few hours later, on March 25, 1975, Presley reportedly jumped from the Hawthorne Bridge into the Willamette River.

On May 11, 1975, a decomposed body was spotted floating in the Willamette River by a tugboat. It was believed to have been in the water for several weeks. The body was reported as being 7-foot tall; Portland police stated that they had no report of a missing man that size. Two phone numbers were found on the body: one for a listing in Detroit and another for Muirs head coach Hall. The Berkeley Gazette speculated that the body was Presley's on May 12, which was confirmed when identification was made from fingerprints the following day. A medical examiner declared that Presley had died of drowning, and his death was ruled a suicide.

== Legacy ==
Presley's life was documented in the 1980 book Almost a Famous Person by Herb Michelson, a columnist for The Sacramento Bee.

== See also ==
- List of basketball players who died during their careers
