= 1977 Toyota Tamaraws season =

- Head coach: Dante Silverio
- Owner(s): Delta Motors Corporation

All-Filipino Conference results
- Record: 13–10 (56.5%)
- Place: 3rd
- Playoff finish: Semifinals

Open Conference results
- Record: 19–11 (63.3%)
- Place: 3rd
- Playoff finish: Semifinals

Invitational Conference results
- Record: 9–1 (90%)
- Place: 1st
- Playoff finish: Finals

Toyota Tamaraws seasons

The 1977 Toyota Tamaraws season was the third season of the franchise in the Philippine Basketball Association (PBA).

== Colors ==
(dark)
(light)

== Transactions ==
Transactions
Nicanor Bulaong Rookie; from Far Eastern University
Pablo Javier Rookie; from Toyota's farm team Crown Motors in the MICAA
Abe King Rookie; from Toyota's farm team Crown Motors in the MICAA
Emerito Legaspi Rookie; from Toyota's farm team Crown Motors in the MICAA
Quirino Salazar Acquired from Tanduay

== Summary ==
The Toyota Tamaraws were the top qualifier in the Group A standings with nine wins and five losses in the All-Filipino Conference. The Tamaraws missed out a finals stint for the first time in seven conferences and settled for a third-place finish via 3–0 sweep off Tanduay.

In the Open Conference, the Tamaraws came up with the best imports seemingly - Bruce "Sky" King and John "Dr.I" Irving. Toyota wound up again with a 9-5 win-loss card after the two-round eliminations. In the semifinal round, Toyota forced a playoff game with arch rival Crispa for the second finals berth following a 104–92 victory, but fell short in the do-or-die game, 87–90. The Tamaraws clinch third place at the expense of Seven-Up.

Toyota came back with a vengeance in the Invitational championship, snapping Crispa's dynastic rule while claiming the league's first three-game title-romp. The visiting Emtex Sacronels (a guest team composed of players from the Brazil national basketball team, including Oscar Schmidt) had a clean seven-game sweep in the elimination round and sealed a titular meeting with the Tamaraws. King and Irving displayed an overwhelming show of power in Toyota's three-game sweep over the Brazilians. The championship was the first for coach Dante Silverio in the third conference.

== Roster ==
Roster	#	Position	Height
Alberto Reynoso	4	Center	6 ft 3 in (1.91 m)
Abe King	6	Forward-Center	6 ft 3 in (1.91 m)
Robert Jaworski	7	Guard	6 ft 0 in (1.83 m)
Francis Arnaiz	8	Guard	5 ft 10 in (1.78 m)
Orlando Bauzon	9	Guard	6 ft 1 in (1.85 m)
Ramon Fernandez	10	Forward-Center	6 ft 4.5 in (1.94 m)
Bruce King ^{Import}	11	Forward-Center	6 ft 8 in (2.03 m)
Pablo Javier	12	Guard	5 ft 11 in (1.80 m)
Jesus Sta. Maria	13	Guard-Forward	5 ft 11 in (1.80 m)
Rino Salazar	14	Guard	5 ft 9 in (1.75 m)
Rodolfo Segura	15	Forward	6 ft 2 in (1.88 m)
Virgilio Cortez ^{Moved to Mariwasa}	16	Forward-Center	6 ft 4 in (1.93 m)
Fort Acuña	17	Forward-Center	6 ft 1 in (1.85 m)
Emerito Legaspi	18	Guard-Forward	5 ft 11 in (1.80 m)
Nicanor Bulaong	20	Forward	6 ft 3 in (1.91 m)
Aurelio Clariño ^{Moved to U-Tex}	23	Center	6 ft 2 in (1.88 m)
John Irving ^{Import}	34	Center	6 ft 10 in (2.08 m)
Oscar Rocha	45	Guard-Forward	5 ft 11 in (1.80 m)
