= 1968 IV FIBA International Christmas Tournament =

1968 IV FIBA International Christmas Tournament "Trofeo Raimundo Saporta"
- Sport: Basketball
- Finals champions: (Spain) Real Madrid
- Runners-up: Uruguay

FIBA International Christmas Tournament seasons
- ← 1967 1969 →

The 1968 IV FIBA International Christmas Tournament "Trofeo Raimundo Saporta" was the 4th edition of the FIBA International Christmas Tournament. It took place at Sports City of Real Madrid Pavilion, Madrid, Spain, on 24, 25 and 26 December 1968 with the participations of Real Madrid (champions of the 1967–68 FIBA European Champions Cup), Uruguay, Meralco Reddy Kilowatts and Picadero.

== League stage ==
Day 1, December 24, 1968

Team 1	Score	Team 2
Real Madrid (Spain)	103–100	(Philippines) Meralco Reddy Kilowatts
Uruguay	80–66	(Spain) Picadero

Day 2, December 25, 1968

Team 1	Score	Team 2
Real Madrid (Spain)	101–81	(Spain) Picadero
Uruguay	102–92	(Philippines) Meralco Reddy Kilowatts

Day 3, December 26, 1968

Team 1	Score	Team 2
Real Madrid (Spain)	99–74	Uruguay
Picadero (Spain)	85–87	(Philippines) Meralco Reddy Kilowatts

== Final standings ==
	Team	Pld	Pts	W	L	PF	PA
1.	(Spain) Real Madrid	3	6	3	0	303	255
2.	Uruguay	3	5	2	1	256	257
3.	(Philippines) Meralco Reddy Kilowatts	3	4	1	2	279	290
4.	(Spain) Picadero	3	3	0	3	232	268

1968 IV FIBA International Christmas Tournament
"Trofeo Raimundo Saporta" Champions

Real Madrid
2nd title
