= Robert Presley =

Robert Presley may refer to:

- Robert B. Presley (1924–2018), American politician
- Bob Presley (1946–1975), American basketball player

== See also ==
- Robert Pressley (born 1959), American racing driver
