= 1987–88 Ohio Bobcats men's basketball team =

American college basketball season

1987–88 Ohio Bobcats men's basketball
- Conference: Mid-American Conference
- Record: 16–14 (9–7 MAC)
- Head coach: Billy Hahn (2nd season)
- Home arena: Convocation Center

1987–88 Mid-American Conference men's basketball standings
	Conf.				Overall
Team	W		L	PCT	W		L	PCT
Eastern Michigan †	14	–	2	.875	22	–	8	.733
Central Michigan	10	–	6	.625	19	–	13	.594
Ohio	9	–	7	.563	16	–	14	.533
Ball State	8	–	8	.500	14	–	14	.500
Western Michigan	7	–	9	.438	12	–	17	.414
Bowling Green	7	–	9	.438	12	–	16	.429
Kent State	6	–	10	.375	10	–	18	.357
Miami (OH)	6	–	10	.375	9	–	18	.333
Toledo	5	–	11	.313	15	–	12	.556
† 1988 MAC tournament winner Rankings from AP Poll

The 1987–88 Ohio Bobcats men's basketball team represented Ohio University in the college basketball season of 1987–88. The team was coached by Billy Hahn and played their home games at the Convocation Center.

== Schedule ==
Date time, TV	Rank^{#}	Opponent^{#}	Result	Record	Site (attendance) city, state
Non-conference regular season
11/28/1987*		Ohio Wesleyan	L 115–122	0–1	Convocation Center; Athens, OH
11/30/1987*		at Morehead State	L 92–99	0–2	Ellis Johnson Arena; Morehead, KY
12/2/1987*		Robert Morris	W 87–57	1–2	Convocation Center; Athens, OH
12/7/1987*		Marshall	L 77–91	1–3	Convocation Center; Athens, OH
12/9/1987*		at Akron	L 69–76	1–4	James A. Rhodes Arena; Akron, OH
12/12/1987*		Boston University	L 81–89	1–5	Convocation Center; Athens, OH
12/15/1987*		at Youngstown State	W 68–60	2–5	Beeghly Center; Youngstown, OH
12/19/1987*		at Vanderbilt	L 77–93	2–6	Memorial Gymnasium; Nashville, TN
12/21/1987*		at Tennessee	W 72–70	3–6	Thompson–Boling Arena; Knoxville, TN
12/30/1987*		UNC Wilmington	W 72–60	4–6	Convocation Center; Athens, OH
1/2/1988*		Bluffton	W 79–66	5–6	Convocation Center; Athens, OH
MAC regular season
1/6/1988		Toledo	W 79–62	6–6 (1–0)	Convocation Center; Athens, OH
1/13/1988		Kent State	W 74–65	7–6 (2–0)	Convocation Center; Athens, OH
1/16/1988		at Ball State	W 58–51	8–6 (3–0)	Irving Gymnasium; Muncie, IN
1/20/1988		Miami (OH)	W 80–76	9–6 (4–0)	Convocation Center; Athens, OH
1/23/1988		at Western Michigan	L 68–71	9–7 (4–1)	University Arena; Kalamazoo, MI
1/27/1988		at Bowling Green	L 65–79	9–8 (4–2)	Anderson Arena; Bowling Green, OH
1/30/1988		Central Michigan	L 65–67	9–9 (4–3)	Convocation Center; Athens, OH
2/3/1988		at Eastern Michigan	L 92–109	9–10 (4–4)	Bowen Field House; Ypsilanti, MI
2/10/1988		at Kent State	L 71–72	10–10 (5–4)	MAC Center; Kent, OH
2/13/1988		Ball State	W 83–63	11–10 (6–4)	Convocation Center; Athens, OH
2/13/1988		at Miami (OH)	L 71–72	11–11 (6–5)	Millett Hall; Oxford, OH
2/20/1988		Western Michigan	W 95–87	12–11 (7–5)	Convocation Center; Athens, OH
2/24/1988		Bowling Green	W 83–70	13–11 (8–5)	Convocation Center; Athens, OH
2/27/1988		Central Michigan	L 61–64	13–12 (8–6)	McGuirk Arena; Mount Pleasant, MI
3/2/1988		Eastern Michigan	L 101–102	13–13 (8–7)	Convocation Center; Athens, OH
3/5/1988		at Toledo	W 106–95	14–13 (9–7)	Savage Arena; Toledo, OH
MAC tournament
3/8/1988		Bowling Green	W 79–73	15–13	Convocation Center; Athens, OH
3/11/1988		vs. Central Michigan	W 64–62	16–13	Centennial Hall; Toledo, OH
3/12/1988		vs. Eastern Michigan; Championship	L 80–94	16–14	Centennial Hall; Toledo, OH
*Non-conference game. ^{#}Rankings from AP Poll. (#) Tournament seedings in parentheses. All times are in Eastern Time.

== Statistics ==
=== Team statistics ===
Final 1987–88 statistics

Record	Ohio	OPP
Scoring	2364	2313
Scoring Average	78.80	77.10
Field goals – Att	893–1774	826–1710
3-pt. Field goals – Att	76–200	132–312
Free throws – Att	502–726	529–743
Rebounds	1109	947
Assists	539	435
Turnovers	467	472
Steals	173	199
Blocked Shots	77	73

=== Player statistics ===
			Minutes		Scoring		Total FGs			3-point FGs			Free-Throws			Rebounds								
Player	GP	GS	Tot	Avg	Pts	Avg	FG	FGA	Pct	3FG	3FA	Pct	FT	FTA	Pct	Off	Def	Tot	Avg	A	PF	TO	Stl	Blk
Paul Graham	30	-	-	-	599	20.0	227	413	0.550	4	9	0.444	141	183	0.770	-	-	153	5.1	80	102	73	40	15
Dave Jamerson	30	-	-	-	519	17.3	198	416	0.476	49	122	0.402	74	87	0.851	-	-	115	3.8	86	68	65	17	2
John Rhodes	30	-	-	-	333	11.1	134	214	0.626	0	0	0.000	65	125	0.520	-	-	281	9.4	47	107	60	18	39
Jamie Brock	30	-	-	-	171	5.7	71	123	0.577	0	0	0.000	29	58	0.500	-	-	72	2.4	15	63	22	5	8
Marty Lehmann	30	-	-	-	171	5.7	58	133	0.436	0	1	0.000	55	71	0.775	-	-	103	3.4	16	68	30	10	2
Reggie Rankin	30	-	-	-	164	5.5	69	146	0.473	5	12	0.417	21	27	0.778	-	-	44	1.5	30	32	32	12	0
Dennis Whitaker	29	-	-	-	160	5.5	54	140	0.386	10	29	0.345	42	60	0.700	-	-	81	2.8	199	70	97	60	6
George Reid	25	-	-	-	103	4.1	34	64	0.531	0	0	0.000	35	61	0.574	-	-	67	2.7	10	69	40	4	4
Sean Jackson	28	-	-	-	73	2.6	22	65	0.338	8	27	0.296	21	22	0.955	-	-	22	0.8	44	29	22	3	0
Ricky Cannon	25	-	-	-	64	2.6	24	55	0.436	0	0	0.000	16	27	0.593	-	-	28	1.1	12	39	20	4	1
Brian Kocher	8	-	-	-	4	0.5	1	2	0.500	0	0	0.000	2	2	1.000	-	-	2	0.3	0	2	2	0	0
John Beauford	2	-	-	-	3	1.5	1	3	0.333	0	0	0.000	0	1	0.000	-	-	1	0.5	0	1	2	0	0
Total	30	-	-	-	2364	78.8	893	1774	0.503	76	200	0.380	502	726	0.691			1109	37.0	539	650	467	173	77
Opponents	30	-	-	-	2313	77.1	826	1710	0.483	132	312	0.423	529	743	0.712			947	31.6	435	636	472	199	73

Legend
GP	Games played	GS	Games started	Avg	Average per game
FG	Field-goals made	FGA	Field-goal attempts	Off	Offensive rebounds
Def	Defensive rebounds	A	Assists	TO	Turnovers
Blk	Blocks	Stl	Steals	High	Team high
