= Jun Ross =

Filipino basketball player

Personal information
- Born: July 14, 1949
- Died: November 24, 2009 (aged 60)

Career information
- High school: Ateneo (Quezon City)
- College: Ateneo
- Number: 7

Career history
- Meralco Reddy Kilowatts

Jun (Lyle M.) Ross Jr. (July 14, 1949–November 24, 2009) is a Filipino former basketball player.

He was born to Lyle Ross Sr. (an American soldier of Scottish descent who served in the Philippines during World War 2) and Maddamou (a Philippine native). Lyle is often referred to and remembered lovingly as "Jun". He is a noted player of the Ateneo Blue Eagles basketball team. He graduated from Ateneo de Manila University in 1971. He was a member of the 1971 MICAA Meralco commercial league Basketball team.

He emigrated to the United States in the early 1970s where he held a variety of business jobs in both New Jersey and California. He died of lung cancer on November 24, 2009, after a lengthy illness. He had two children Richard Ross and Megan M. Ross (born 1988).

== Ateneo days ==
Lyle Ross Jr. started his basketball career as co-captain of the Ateneo Midgets who held a record of 24–1. From 1963 to 1967, he was a member of the Ateneo Juniors, as co-captain they won the NCAA championship with an undefeated record. In 1966 and 1967 he was a part of the NCAA Juniors Mythical Five. During his college years he was a member of the senior Blue Eagle team for his four years at Ateneo de Manila University. He was part of the NCAA selection for two years. Considered by many alumni as the strongest team Ateneo has ever assembled, Lyle, was part of the 1969 NCAA champion team.

Though his main focus was basketball, Jun also participated in cross-country where in high school he was a two time champion. He was a member of the track and field from 1964 to 1971. He participated and won medals in the long jump, high jump, triple jump, 4 x 100 relay, and 4 x 400 relay. Over-all he won a total of 16 gold medals, 2 silver medals, and 2 bronze medals in the NCAA track and field competitions.

As a basketball member, Jun wore the number 7 through his years at Ateneo.

== Later life ==
Jun played for the MICAA Meralco basketball in 1971; a team which was sponsored by 7-UP. During that year the team won the MICAA Championship. After emigrating to the United States, Jun hung up his basketball shoes and started a professional life as a business man. He managed several businesses in both New Jersey and California.

He was inducted into the Ateneo de Manila Sports Hall of Fame on December 8, 2000, at the Moro Lorenzo Sports Center (Philippines).

== Personal life ==
Lyle was married in the Philippines and had one child, a son named Richard before emigrating to the United States. After leaving the Philippines he settled down on the East Coast primarily in New Jersey. In 1985 he married a long-time girlfriend Jan and in 1988 had a baby girl named Megan. In the early 1990s Jan and Lyle divorced and he married Jane Alcala to whom he remained married to until his death. In 2000, he relocated to California with his wife Jane, stepdaughter Grace, and grandson Christian.

Though thousands of miles away from his homeland, Lyle still remained a Blue Eagle fan. He recounted his days at Ateneo often and fondly. He was honored to be a part of the Ateneo Sports Hall of Fame and stayed in touch with many of his former teammates and classmates.

He battled lung cancer for over a year until he succumbed to his death on November 24, 2009. He was surrounded by his family at this time. He has left behind a sports legacy and a family that loves him dearly.

He is survived by his wife Jane, his daughter Megan, his son Richard.
