= 1967 III FIBA International Christmas Tournament =

1967 III FIBA International Christmas Tournament "Trofeo Raimundo Saporta"
- Sport: Basketball
- Finals champions: (Spain) Real Madrid
- Runners-up: (Spain) Juventud Kalso

FIBA International Christmas Tournament seasons
- ← 1966 1968 →

The 1967 III FIBA International Christmas Tournament "Trofeo Raimundo Saporta" was the 3rd edition of the FIBA International Christmas Tournament. It took place at Sports City of Real Madrid Pavilion, Madrid, Spain, on 24, 25 and 26 December 1967 with the participations of Real Madrid (champions of the 1966–67 FIBA European Champions Cup), Juventud Kalso (champions of the 1966–67 Liga Española de Baloncesto), Victoria Melbourne and River Plate.

== League stage ==
Day 1, December 24, 1967

Team 1	Score	Team 2
Real Madrid (Spain)	86–69	(Spain) Juventud Kalso
Victoria Melbourne (Australia)	80–56	(Argentina) River Plate

Day 2, December 25, 1967

Team 1	Score	Team 2
Real Madrid (Spain)	85–66	(Argentina) River Plate
Juventud Kalso (Spain)	82–75	(Australia) Victoria Melbourne

Day 3, December 26, 1967

Team 1	Score	Team 2
Real Madrid (Spain)	91–60	(Australia) Victoria Melbourne
Juventud Kalso (Spain)	84–73	(Argentina) River Plate

== Final standings ==
	Team	Pld	Pts	W	L	PF	PA
1.	(Spain) Real Madrid	3	6	3	0	262	195
2.	(Spain) Juventud Kalso	3	5	2	1	235	234
3.	(Australia) Victoria Melbourne	3	4	1	2	215	229
4.	(Argentina) River Plate	3	3	0	3	195	249

1967 III FIBA International Christmas Tournament
"Trofeo Raimundo Saporta" Champions

Real Madrid
1st title
