= Alfonso Marquez (basketball) =

Filipino basketball player (1938–2020)

Alfonso Márquez
Personal information
- Born: March 29, 1938 Zamboanga City, Philippine Commonwealth
- Died: April 15, 2020 (aged 82)
- Listed height: 6 ft 0 in (183 cm)
- Listed weight: 168 lb (76 kg)

Career information
- High school: Ateneo de Zamboanga (Zamboanga City)
- College: UV
Medals
Men's basketball
Representing Philippines
ABC Championship
Gold medal – first place	1960 Manila	Team
Silver medal – second place	1965 Kuala Lumpur	Team
Gold medal – first place	1967 Seoul	Team
Asian Games
Gold medal – first place	1962 Jakarta	Team

Alfonso R. Márquez (March 29, 1938 – April 15, 2020), better known as Boy Márquez, was a Filipino basketball player and coach. Márquez was born in Zamboanga City, Philippines.

== Youth career ==
Alfonso Márquez played for the high school team of Ateneo de Zamboanga where he was mentored by a Jesuit priest. He was later scouted by coach Eddie Gullas who convinced him to suit up for the Green Lancers collegiate team of the University of Visayas (UV). He came into wider public attention due to UV's upset 74–63 win against the Ateneo de Manila in an intercollegiate tournament in Manila in 1957. In that game, Márquez who was 19-years-old at that time is the third highest UV scorer accounting for 16 points for the Green Lancers.

== Club career ==
Márquez joined Ysmael Steel Admirals in 1958. He won six championships as a part of the Ysmael Steel squad. An all-around player, he could play the center, forward and guard positions. He later played for Meralco and Mariwasa during the 1970s in the Manila Industrial and Commercial Athletic Association.

== International career ==
Márquez was a former member of Philippine national team. His performance playing with the University of Visayas gained the attention of head coach Baby Dalupan helping Márquez secure a place in the Philippines roster for the 1959 FIBA World Championship in Chile.

Márquez has also suited up for the Philippines at the Olympic Games participating in 1960 edition in Rome and the 1968 edition in Mexico City. In the 1960 Summer Olympics, the Philippines placed 11th and in 1968, the national squad placed 13th. Márquez played a significant role in the Philippines' 63–60 win against South Korea in the play off for 13th place. Márquez contributed the most points for the Philippines in that game scoring 18 points while his Korean counterpart Shin Dong-pa made 16 points for his team.

== Retirement and later life ==
Márquez retired from competitive basketball to focus on his family. He held a management position at the Kamuning branch of Meralco and later held a position in the government accounts department in the main office of the same electricity company. In his later years leading to his death on April 15, 2020, Márquez had been in frail health.
