= 1987–88 Eastern Michigan Hurons men's basketball team =

American college basketball season

1987–88 Eastern Michigan Eagles men's basketball

MAC Regular season champions MAC tournament champions

NCAA tournament, First Round
- Conference: Mid-American Conference
- Record: 22–8 (14–2 MAC)
- Head coach: Ben Braun (3rd season)
- Assistant coach: Brian Miller
- Home arena: Bowen Field House

1987–88 Mid-American Conference men's basketball standings
	Conf.				Overall
Team	W		L	PCT	W		L	PCT
Eastern Michigan †	14	–	2	.875	22	–	8	.733
Central Michigan	10	–	6	.625	19	–	13	.594
Ohio	9	–	7	.563	16	–	14	.533
Ball State	8	–	8	.500	14	–	14	.500
Western Michigan	7	–	9	.438	12	–	17	.414
Bowling Green	7	–	9	.438	12	–	16	.429
Kent State	6	–	10	.375	10	–	18	.357
Miami (OH)	6	–	10	.375	9	–	18	.333
Toledo	5	–	11	.313	15	–	12	.556
† 1988 MAC tournament winner Rankings from AP Poll

The 1987–88 Eastern Michigan Hurons men's basketball team represented Eastern Michigan University during the 1987–88 NCAA Division I men's basketball season. The Hurons, led by head coach Ben Braun, played their home games at Bowen Field House and were members of the Mid-American Conference. They finished the season 22–8, 14–2 in MAC play. They were MAC Regular season and MAC tournament champions, and received an automatic bid to the NCAA tournament as No. 15 seed in the Midwest region. Making the first NCAA Tournament appearance in school history, the Hurons fell to No. 2 seed Pittsburgh in the opening round.

== Roster ==
1987–88 Eastern Michigan Hurons men's basketball team
Players
Coaches

Pos.	#	Name	Height	Weight	Year	Previous school	Hometown
G	15	Lorenzo Neely	—	—	Fr
G	23	Charles Thomas	6 ft 4 in (1.93 m)	180 lb (82 kg)	Fr	Everett HS	Lansing, Michigan
G/F	31	Carl Thomas	6 ft 4 in (1.93 m)	175 lb (79 kg)	Fr	Everett HS	Lansing, Michigan
PF		Grant Long	6 ft 9 in (2.06 m)	235 lb (107 kg)	Sr	Romulus HS	Romulus, Michigan

Head coach

- Ben Braun

Assistant coach(es)

- Brian Miller

Legend

- (C) Team captain
- (S) Suspended
- (I) Ineligible
- (W) Walk-on
- Injured
- Current redshirt

== Schedule and results ==
Date time, TV	Rank^{#}	Opponent^{#}	Result	Record	Site (attendance) city, state
Regular season
Nov 28, 1987*		Wisconsin-Milwaukee	W 71–67	1–0	Bowen Field House; Ypsilanti, Michigan
Nov 30, 1987*		Oakland	W 117–107	2–0	Bowen Field House; Ypsilanti, Michigan
Dec 4, 1987*		vs. Alcorn State; Wadsworth Show-Me Classic	W 75–61	3–0	Hearnes Center; Columbia, Missouri
Dec 5, 1987*		at No. 8 Missouri; Wadsworth Show-Me Classic	L 75–77 ^{2OT}	3–1	Hearnes Center; Columbia, Missouri
Dec 9, 1987*		Detroit Mercy	W 79–66	4–1	Bowen Field House; Ypsilanti, Michigan
Dec 12, 1987*		at No. 15 Michigan	L 63–115	4–2	Crisler Arena; Ann Arbor, Michigan
Dec 17, 1987*		Michigan State	W 84–80 ^{OT}	5–2	Bowen Field House; Ypsilanti, Michigan
Dec 19, 1987*		at Chicago State	L 80–83	5–3	Dickens Athletic Center; Chicago, Illinois
Dec 23, 1987*		at Cleveland State	L 88–103	5–4	Woodling Gym; Cleveland, Ohio
Jan 2, 1988*		at Valparaiso	L 57–59	5–5	Athletics-Recreation Center; Valparaiso, Indiana
Jan 6, 1988		at Central Michigan	W 72–65	6–5 (1–0)	Daniel P. Rose Center; Mount Pleasant, Michigan
Jan 9, 1988		Bowling Green	W 81–66	7–5 (2–0)	Bowen Field House; Ypsilanti, Michigan
Jan 13, 1988		Toledo	W 82–54	8–5 (3–0)	Bowen Field House; Ypsilanti, Michigan
Jan 16, 1988*		St. Mary's	W 101–77	9–5	Bowen Field House; Ypsilanti, Michigan
Jan 20, 1988		Kent State	W 75–70	10–5 (4–0)	Bowen Field House; Ypsilanti, Michigan
Jan 23, 1988		at Ball State	W 72–71	11–5 (5–0)	Irving Gymnasium; Muncie, Indiana
Jan 27, 1988		Miami (OH)	W 81–69	12–5 (6–0)	Bowen Field House; Ypsilanti, Michigan
Jan 30, 1988		at Western Michigan	L 78–81	12–6 (6–1)	University Arena; Kalamazoo, Michigan
Feb 3, 1988		Ohio	W 109–92	13–6 (7–1)	Bowen Field House; Ypsilanti, Michigan
Feb 6, 1988		at Bowling Green	W 78–64	14–6 (8–1)	Anderson Arena; Bowling Green, Ohio
Feb 10, 1988		at Toledo	W 81–66	15–6 (9–1)	Savage Arena; Toledo, Ohio
Feb 17, 1988		at Kent State	L 76–83	15–7 (9–2)	MAC Center; Kent, Ohio
Feb 20, 1988		Ball State	W 77–68	16–7 (10–2)	Bowen Field House; Ypsilanti, Michigan
Feb 24, 1988		at Miami (OH)	W 69–52	17–7 (11–2)	Millett Hall; Oxford, Ohio
Feb 27, 1988		Western Michigan	W 96–82	18–7 (12–2)	Bowen Field House; Ypsilanti, Michigan
Mar 2, 1988		at Ohio	W 102–101	19–7 (13–2)	Convocation Center; Athens, Ohio
Mar 5, 1988		Central Michigan	W 79–64	20–7 (14–2)	Bowen Field House; Ypsilanti, Michigan
MAC tournament
Mar 9, 1988*		vs. Western Michigan; Semifinals	W 95–88	21–7	John F. Savage Hall; Toledo, Ohio
Mar 10, 1988*		vs. Ohio; Championship game	W 94–80	22–7	John F. Savage Hall; Toledo, Ohio
NCAA tournament
Mar 18, 1988*; ESPN; NCAA Productions	(15 MW)	vs. (2 MW) No. 8 Pittsburgh; First Round	L 90–108	22–8	Bob Devaney Sports Center (14,375); Lincoln, Nebraska
*Non-conference game. ^{#}Rankings from AP Poll. (#) Tournament seedings in parentheses. MW=Midwest. All times are in Eastern Time.
