= 1988 MAC men's basketball tournament =

Men's basketball championship

- Classification: Division I
- Season: 1987–88
- Teams: 7
- First round site: Campus Arenas; Campus Sites
- Finals site: Centennial Hall; Toledo, OH
- Champions: Eastern Michigan (1st title)
- Winning coach: Ben Braun (1st title)
- MVP: Grant Long (Eastern Michigan)
- MAC men's basketball tournaments

1987–88 Mid-American Conference men's basketball standings
	Conf.				Overall
Team	W		L	PCT	W		L	PCT
Eastern Michigan †	14	–	2	.875	22	–	8	.733
Central Michigan	10	–	6	.625	19	–	13	.594
Ohio	9	–	7	.563	16	–	14	.533
Ball State	8	–	8	.500	14	–	14	.500
Western Michigan	7	–	9	.438	12	–	17	.414
Bowling Green	7	–	9	.438	12	–	16	.429
Kent State	6	–	10	.375	10	–	18	.357
Miami (OH)	6	–	10	.375	9	–	18	.333
Toledo	5	–	11	.313	15	–	12	.556
† 1988 MAC tournament winner Rankings from AP Poll

The 1988 MAC men's basketball tournament was held March 8–10 at Centennial Hall in Toledo, Ohio. Top-seeded Eastern Michigan defeated Ohio in the championship game by the score of 94–80 to win their first MAC men's basketball tournament and a bid to the NCAA tournament. There they lost to Pittsburgh in the first round. Grant Long of Eastern Michigan was named the tournament MVP.

== Format ==
Seven of the nine MAC teams participated. All games were played at Centennial Hall in Toledo, Ohio.

== Bracket ==
Quarterfinals; March 8
5	Western Michigan	80
4	Ball State	79
3	Ohio	79
6	Bowling Green	73
7	Kent State	56
2	Central Michigan	66

Semifinals; March 9
1	Eastern Michigan	95
5	Western Michigan	88
3	Ohio	64
2	Central Michigan	62

Final; March 10
1	Eastern Michigan	94
3	Ohio	80
