= 1969 V FIBA International Christmas Tournament =

1969 V FIBA International Christmas Tournament "Trofeo Raimundo Saporta"
- Sport: Basketball
- Finals champions: (Spain) Real Madrid
- Runners-up: Panama

FIBA International Christmas Tournament seasons
- ← 1968 1970 →

The 1969 V FIBA International Christmas Tournament "Trofeo Raimundo Saporta" was the 5th edition of the FIBA International Christmas Tournament. It took place at Sports City of Real Madrid Pavilion, Madrid, Spain, on 24, 25 and 26 December 1969 with the participations of Real Madrid (champions of the 1968–69 Liga Española de Baloncesto) and also runners-up of the 1968–69 FIBA European Champions Cup), Panama, Buenos Aires Selection and Juventud Nerva (champions of the 1968–69 Copa del Rey de Baloncesto and also runners-up of the 1968–69 Liga Española de Baloncesto).

== League stage ==
Day 1, December 24, 1969

Team 1	Score	Team 2
Real Madrid (Spain)	107–91	(Argentina) Buenos Aires Selection
Panama	80–74	(Spain) Juventud Nerva

Day 2, December 25, 1969

Team 1	Score	Team 2
Real Madrid (Spain)	103–94	(Spain) Juventud Nerva
Panama	70–79	(Argentina) Buenos Aires Selection

Day 3, December 26, 1969

Team 1	Score	Team 2
Real Madrid (Spain)	87–92	Panama
Juventud Nerva (Spain)	86–90	(Argentina) Buenos Aires Selection

== Final standings ==
	Team	Pld	Pts	W	L	PF	PA
1.	(Spain) Real Madrid	3	5	2	1	297	277
2.	Panama	3	5	2	1	242	240
3.	(Argentina) Buenos Aires Selection	3	5	2	1	260	263
4.	(Spain) Juventud Nerva	3	3	0	3	254	273

1969 V FIBA International Christmas Tournament
"Trofeo Raimundo Saporta" Champions

Real Madrid
3rd title
