= Meralco Reddy Kilowatts =

Basketball team

MERALCO Reddy Kilowatts
- Leagues: MICAA
- Founded: 1968
- History: 1968-1972
- Location: Philippines
- Team colors: Orange, black, yellow, white
- President: Manuel M. López
- Head coach: Felicisimo Fajardo; Valentin "Tito" Eduque; Lauro Mumar
- Championships: BAP (2): 1969 National Seniors; 1970 National Invitational; MICAA (1): 1971 Open

The MERALCO Reddy Kilowatts were a basketball team of the MERALCO Athletic Club owned by the Manila Electric Company (MERALCO) that played in the Manila Industrial and Commercial Athletic Association (MICAA) from 1968 to 1972. Its moniker and mascot, Reddy Kilowatt, was a licensed branding character used by the company during that period. The company briefly joined the MICAA prior to World War II and was re-admitted in 1968.

The team consisted of players from the just-disbanded Ysmael Steel Admirals – namely, Alberto “Big Boy” Reynoso, Alfonso “Boy” Marquez, Jimmy Mariano and Orlando Bauzon. Other players included, Ramon Lucindo, Robert Jaworski, Fort Acuña, Francis Arnaiz, Bobby Salonga, Arthur Herrera, Larry Mumar and Jumbo Salvador. The team was originally coached by Valentin “Tito” Eduque. In 1970, Lauro Mumar took over the position of head coach.

After the demise of the YCO-Ysmael Steel rivalry following the breakup of the Ysmael Steel Admirals in 1968, the Reddy Kilowatts and the Crispa-Floro Redmanizers began its own rivalry beginning in 1970. The rivalry came into full bloom on December 19, 1971, during their last 1971 MICAA All-Filipino elimination round game - when Reynoso and Jaworski mauled referees Eriberto “Ting” Cruz and Jose “Joe” Obias in retaliation for what Reynoso and Jaworski perceived to be dubious calls against them. Reynoso and Jaworski were meted lifetime suspensions by the Basketball Association of the Philippines. The suspensions were lifted through the efforts of Presidential Assistant Guillermo “Gimo” de Vega in time for the 1973 FIBA Asia Championship.

The team disbanded in 1972 in the wake of the declaration of Martial Law in the Philippines, wherein the Marcos government seized the company from Eugenio López, Sr.

Reynoso, Jaworski, Bauzon, Acuña and Arnaiz went on to form the nucleus of the Komatsu Komets/Toyota Comets in 1973. The Comets carried on MERALCO’s rivalry with Crispa beginning in 1974, during the 1974 MICAA All-Filipino tournament.

In 2010, Meralco returned to Philippine basketball with the Meralco Bolts in the Philippine Basketball Association. On April 9, 2025, the Bolts wore the jerseys of the 1971 Kilowatts as part of the PBA's 50th anniversary. Those jerseys will be worn again starting with the 2025–26 PBA season as part of the Bolts' 15th anniversary rebrand.

== Championships ==
The Reddy Kilowatts won one MICAA championship in the 1971 MICAA Open, defeating Crispa, 65–58, before a banner crowd at the Araneta Coliseum. This was MERALCO's only MICAA basketball title since rejoining the league in 1968. They also won two (2) National (BAP) titles - the 1969 National Seniors and the 1970 National Invitational.

== Rosters ==
=== 1971 MICAA Open Champion team ===
Meralco Reddy Kilowatts roster
Players
Coaches

Pos.	No.	Nat.	Name	Ht.	Wt.
F/C	4	(Philippines)	Alberto Reynoso	6 ft 2 in (1.88 m)	220 lb (100 kg)
G	5	(Philippines)	Bobby Salonga	5 ft 11 in (1.80 m)	165 lb (75 kg)
F	6	(Philippines)	Jimmy Mariano	6 ft 4 in (1.93 m)	160 lb (73 kg)
G	7	(Philippines)	Robert Jaworski	6 ft 1 in (1.85 m)	185 lb (84 kg)
G	8	(Philippines)	Francis Arnaiz	5 ft 11 in (1.80 m)	162 lb (73 kg)
G	9	(Philippines)	Orlando Bauzon	6 ft 1 in (1.85 m)	180 lb (82 kg)
G	10	(Philippines)	Engracio Arazas
G	11	(Philippines)	Alfonso Marquez	6 ft 0 in (1.83 m)
F	12	(Philippines)	Jumbo Salvador	5 ft 10 in (1.78 m)
G	13	(Philippines)	Jun Ross
G	15	(Philippines)	Lawrence Mumar	5 ft 11 in (1.80 m)	135 lb (61 kg)
F	16	(Philippines)	Ramon Lucindo	6 ft 2 in (1.88 m)	170 lb (77 kg)
G/F	18	(Philippines)	Fort Acuña	6 ft 1 in (1.85 m)	185 lb (84 kg)
C	20	(United States)	Bob Presley (I)	6 ft 10 in (2.08 m)
C	21	(United States)	Carl Greenfield (I)	6 ft 8 in (2.03 m)

Head coach

- (Philippines) Lauro Mumar

Legend

- (C) Team captain
- Injured

=== Other notable players ===
- Jing Aldanese
- Chito Afable
- Ric Cabrera
- Arthur Herrera
- Rudy Hines
- Dave Regullano
- Joseph Wilson

=== Imports ===
- Charles Greenfield
- Don Griffin
- Tine Hardeman
- Bob Presley

== Coaches ==
- Felicisimo Fajardo (1967)
- Valentin Eduque (1968–1970)
- Lauro Mumar (1970–1972)

== Team manager ==
- Manuel M. López (Meralco vice-president and adviser of the Meralco Athletic Club).
- Emmanuel J. Ledesma

== See also ==
- Meralco Bolts
- F.C. Meralco Manila
- Meralco Power Spikers
