= Ben Braun =

American basketball coach (born 1953)

Biographical details
- Born: November 25, 1953 (age 72); Chicago, Illinois, U.S.

Playing career
- 1972–1975: Wisconsin

Coaching career (HC unless noted)
- 1975–1977: Washington Park HS (WI) (assistant)
- 1977–1985: Siena Heights
- 1985–1986: Eastern Michigan (assistant)
- 1986–1996: Eastern Michigan
- 1996–2008: California
- 2008–2014: Rice

Head coaching record
- Overall: 615–517
- Tournaments: 7–8 (NCAA Division I); 8–3 (NIT); 2–1 (CIT)

Accomplishments and honors

Championships
- NIT (1999); 3 MAC regular season (1988, 1991, 1996); 3 MAC tournament (1988, 1991, 1996)

Awards
- 3x MAC Coach of the Year (1988, 1991, 1996); Pac-10 Coach of the Year (1997)

Benjamin Abraham Braun (born November 25, 1953) is an American former men's college basketball coach and college basketball analyst. He served as the head men's basketball coach at Siena Heights University (1977–1985), Eastern Michigan University (1986–1996), the University of California, Berkeley (1996–2008), and Rice University (2008–2014), compiling a career coaching record of 615–517. He won the most games (185) of any head coach in the history of the Eastern Michigan Eagles men's basketball program and was named Mid-American Conference Coach of the Year three times. As the head coach of the California Golden Bears, he won the Pac-10 Coach of the Year and had a 219–154 record (.587). As of 2025, Braun is a college basketball analyst for ESPN, and formerly the Pac-12 Network.

== Early and personal life ==
Braun was born in Chicago, Illinois and is Jewish. His father is Academy Award nominee producer Zev Braun. He graduated from New Trier High School in Winnetka, Illinois, where he excelled on both the basketball team and, as a shortstop, on the baseball team.

Braun played one year of basketball at the University of Wisconsin–La Crosse. He then transferred to the University of Wisconsin–Madison. He earned a teaching degree in English, with a minor in African-American Studies, in June 1975. He earned a master's degree in guidance and counseling from Siena Heights in 1980.

He and his wife, Jessica, have a son Julius and a daughter Eliza.

== Basketball coaching career ==
After graduating from Wisconsin in 1975, Braun began his career as an assistant coach at Washington Park High School in Racine, Wisconsin. After two years of coaching high school basketball, he accepted the head coaching job at Siena Heights University. Braun coached Siena Heights for eight years, taking the National Association of Intercollegiate Athletics (NAIA) school to a 148–103 record and five postseason tournaments.

Prior to the 1985–86 season, Braun took on the position of associate head coach at Eastern Michigan. Midway through the year, on January 15, 1986, he was elevated to interim head coach. Within two years his Hurons (Eagles from 1991 onwards) were in the NCAA Tournament for the first time in school history. During his 11 years at Eastern Michigan, he guided the Eagles to four postseason berths, including three NCAA appearances. Braun accumulated a record of 185–132 and was named Mid-American Conference Coach of the Year three times. His 185 wins are the most by a coach in Eastern Michigan Eagles men's basketball history.

In the summer of 1989, he was the head coach of the U.S. men's basketball team at the 1989 Maccabiah Games. The team lost to Team Israel in the final.

Braun replaced Todd Bozeman as the head coach at Cal prior to the 1996–97 season. Expectations were low as the Golden Bears were predicted to finish in the bottom half of the conference. However, the team finished tied for second in the conference and reached the NCAA Sweet 16. The team finished the season 23–9 and gave Braun a school record for most wins by a Bear coach in his first year with the program. Braun went on to win the Pac-10 Coach of the Year – the first Cal coach to ever receive the award.

In the 1998–99 season, Braun's club defeated North Carolina, UCLA, and Arizona during the course of the year to become the first team ever at Cal to beat three Top 10 schools in the same season. Then after entering the NIT, the Bears, led by Geno Carlisle, won five consecutive postseason games to capture the NIT title – Cal's first postseason tournament championship since the Bears won the 1959 NCAA title. Cal finished the 1998–99 campaign with a 22–11 record.

In 2000–01, the Bears returned to the NCAA Tournament, finishing with a 20–11 record, and Sean Lampley – Braun's first recruit at Cal after NCAA sanctions were lifted from Bozeman's tenure – became the school's all-time leading scorer late in his senior campaign, finishing with 1,776 points.

In 2001–02, the Bears again went 23–9 and tied for second in the Pac-10 standings. Cal earned a No. 6 seed in the NCAA playoffs, where the Bears toppled Penn before falling to Pittsburgh in the second round.

In 2002–03, Cal again reached the second round of the NCAA Tournament behind All-Pac-10 forwards Joe Shipp and Amit Tamir. Shipp ended his career in the No. 3 position on the Bears' all-time scoring list, while teammate Brian Wethers finished in the No. 15 position.

In 2005–06, Cal defeated USC and Oregon to reach the Pac-10 Tournament final for the first time ever. Leon Powe and the Bears then earned a No. 7 regional seed in the NCAA Tournament and finished the year with a 20–11 mark. On November 21, 2005, Cal defeated Long Beach State, 88–69, to give Braun his 500th career win.

After losing to Ohio State in the 2008 National Invitation Tournament, Braun was fired as head coach of the Golden Bears on March 26. During his tenure at Cal, Braun directed the Bears to more postseason appearances and more postseason victories than any coach in school history. His 219 wins in 12 years are second to Nibs Price (1925–54, 449–294) in both tenure and wins at Cal, while his Cal winning percentage (.606) is the best at the school since Hall of Famer Pete Newell guided the Bears to a 119–44 mark from 1955 to 1960.

Braun was hired as the head men's coach at Rice, replacing Willis Wilson in 2008. He resigned on March 13, 2014, after six seasons with the Owls, compiling a 63–128 record.

In 2023, the basketball court at the George Gervin GameAbove Center, where Eastern Michigan plays, was named after Braun. In May 2025, he was inducted to the Mid-American Conference Hall of Fame.

== Head coaching record ==
Record table
Season	Team	Overall	Conference	Standing	Postseason
Siena Heights Saints () (1977–1985)
1977–78	Siena Heights	8–21			
1978–79	Siena Heights	24–6			
1979–80	Siena Heights	21–11			
1980–81	Siena Heights	22–11			
1981–82	Siena Heights	19–13			
1982–83	Siena Heights	21–12			
1983–84	Siena Heights	15–14			
1984–85	Siena Heights	18–15			
Siena Heights:		148–103 (.590)			
Eastern Michigan Hurons / Eagles (Mid-American Conference) (1986–1996)
1985–86	Eastern Michigan	5–10	4–10	T–9th	
1986–87	Eastern Michigan	14–15	8–8	4th	
1987–88	Eastern Michigan	22–8	14–2	1st	NCAA Division I First Round
1988–89	Eastern Michigan	17–12	8–8	4th	
1989–90	Eastern Michigan	19–13	8–8	5th	
1990–91	Eastern Michigan	26–7	13–3	1st	NCAA Division I Sweet 16
1991–92	Eastern Michigan	9–22	4–12	8th	
1992–93	Eastern Michigan	13–17	8–10	6th	
1993–94	Eastern Michigan	15–12	10–8	T–5th	
1994–95	Eastern Michigan	20–10	12–6	3rd	NIT First Round
1995–96	Eastern Michigan	25–6	14–4	1st	NCAA Division I Second Round
Eastern Michigan:		185–132 (.584)	103–79 (.566)		
California Golden Bears (Pacific-10 Conference) (1996–2008)
1996–97	California	23–9	12–6	T–2nd	NCAA Division I Sweet 16
1997–98	California	12–15	8–10	T–5th	
1998–99	California	22–11	8–10	T–5th	NIT champion
1999–00	California	18–15	7–11	7th	NIT Quarterfinal
2000–01	California	20–11	11–7	T–4th	NCAA Division I First Round
2001–02	California	23–9	12–6	T–2nd	NCAA Division I Second Round
2002–03	California	22–9	13–5	3rd	NCAA Division I Second Round
2003–04	California	13–15	9–9	T–4th	
2004–05	California	13–16	6–12	T–8th	
2005–06	California	20–11	12–6	3rd	NCAA Division I First Round
2006–07	California	16–17	6–12	9th	
2007–08	California	17–16	6–12	8th	NIT Second Round
California:		219–154 (.587)	110–106 (.509)		
Rice Owls (Conference USA) (2008–2014)
2008–09	Rice	10–22	4–12	T–10th	
2009–10	Rice	8–23	1–15	12th	
2010–11	Rice	14–18	5–11	10th	
2011–12	Rice	17–15	8–8	7th	CIT Quarterfinal
2012–13	Rice	5–26	1–15	12th	
2013–14	Rice	7–23	2–14	16th	
Rice:		63–128 (.330)	21–75 (.219)		
Total:		615–517 (.543)			
National champion Postseason invitational champion Conference regular season champion Conference regular season and conference tournament champion Division regular season champion Division regular season and conference tournament champion Conference tournament champion

== See also ==
- List of college men's basketball coaches with 600 wins
