= Orly Bauzon =

Filipino basketball player and coach (1944–2020)

Personal information
- Born: November 17, 1944 Calasiao, Pangasinan, Philippine Commonwealth
- Died: September 5, 2020 (aged 75) Quezon City, Philippines
- Listed height: 6 ft 1 in (186 cm)
- Listed weight: 183 lb (83 kg)

Career information
- College: UST

Career history

Playing
- –: Meralco Reddy Kilowatts
- 1973–1978: Toyota Comets
- 1978: Mariwasa Honda Wildcats

Coaching
- 1980–1981: Bax Jeans
- 1983–1984: PUP (men)
- 1985–1987: UST (women)
- 1985–1986: PHCR (men)
- 1988: UST (men)
- 1992: Adamson (men)
- 1995: UP (men)
- 1998: Pangasinan Presidents
Medals
Representing Philippines
Representing Philippines
ABC Championship
Silver medal – second place	1965 Kuala Lumpur	Team
Gold medal – first place	1967 Seoul	Team

Orlando "Orly" Bauzon (November 17, 1944 – September 5, 2020) was a Filipino basketball player and coach.

== Early life ==
Bauzon was born on November 17, 1944, in Calasiao, Pangasinan in the Philippines during the later years of the Japanese occupation of the islands during the World War II era.

== Playing career ==
=== Collegiate ===
Bauzon played for the men's basketball collegiate varsity team of the University of Santo Tomas (UST).

=== MICAA ===
In the MICAA, he played for the multi-titled Ysmael Steel Admirals, the Meralco Reddy Kilowatts, and the Komatsu Komets/Toyota Comets.

Bauzon joined Toyota in its first MICAA tournament in 1973 and was instrumental in securing his team a place in the final with his last second shot in the semifinal. Toyota won against the Concepcion Motorolas in the final.

=== PBA ===
He continued with Toyota when the franchise transferred to the PBA. He ended his playing career with the Mariwasa Honda Wildcats (1978).

=== National team ===
Bauzon also played for the Philippine national team and competed at the 1968 Summer Olympics in Mexico City. He also represented the country at the 1970 Asian Games in Bangkok and the 1967 ABC Championship in Seoul. In the latter, the Philippines won the title besting hosts South Korea in the de facto final.

== Coaching career ==
After his retirement from competitive basketball as player in 1978, he has coached various collegiate teams. He has coached his alma mater UST during UAAP Season 51 in 1988 where his squad finished seventh and Adamson University which he led to the UAAP Season 55 finals in 1992 where Adamson faced eventual champions Far Eastern University. He has also mentored the University of the Philippines in 1995 and the Pangasinan Presidents of the Metropolitan Basketball Association in 1998.

== Death ==
Bauzon died on September 5, 2020, in Quezon City due to cardiac arrest at age 75.

== Personal life ==
Bauzon was married to Josie Bauzon who was the first female Philippine Sports Commission commissioner. His wife died in 2011.
