= Rene Herrerias =

American basketball player-coach

Biographical details
- Born: June 4, 1926 (age 100); San Francisco, California, U.S.

Playing career
- 1947–1950: San Francisco
- Position: Guard

Coaching career (HC unless noted)
- 1950–1956: St. Ignatius Prep
- 1956–1960: California (assistant)
- 1960–1968: California

Head coaching record
- Overall: 97–101

Rene Anthony Herrerias (born June 4, 1926) is an American basketball coach. He served as head coach at University of California, Berkeley from 1960 to 1968.

Born in San Francisco, Herrerias graduated from St. Ignatius College Preparatory in 1944 and served in the United States Navy afterwards.

From 1947 to 1950, Herrerias played college basketball at the University of San Francisco, where he was a member of the 1949 NIT championship team coached by Pete Newell. Herrerias received All-American honors (HM) in 1950. After graduating, he became head coach at St. Ignatius Prep. As coach, Herrerias led St. Ignatius to four state titles, in 1951, 1954, 1955, and 1956. Herrerias also taught history and typing at St. Igantius.

Herrerias reunited with Newell as an assistant coach at Cal. In 1960, Herrerias succeeded Newell as Cal's head coach. He resigned in 1968 because of a dispute with athlete Bob Presley. Presley was suspended from the team for violation of team training rules. Presley was reinstated three days later, but relations between African-American and white players on the team remained tense. Herrerias and Newell resigned after the 1968 season. Herrerias has a record of 97–101 in his eight seasons at Cal.

After resigning from Cal, Herrerias became a history teacher and Basketball coach at El Camino High School in South San Francisco.

== Head coaching record ==
Record table
Season	Team	Overall	Conference	Standing	Postseason
California Golden Bears (Athletic Association of Western Universities) (1960–1968)
1960–61	California	13–9	5–7	4th	
1961–62	California	8–17	2–10	5th	
1962–63	California	13–11	4–8	5th	
1963–64	California	13–14	8–7	3rd	
1964–65	California	8–15	4–10	7th	
1965–66	California	9–16	4–10	T–7th	
1966–67	California	17–10	6–8	T–5th	
1967–68	California	16–9	7–7	4th	
California:		97–101	40–67		
Total:		97–101			
