= Alberto Reynoso =

Filipino basketball player

Personal information
- Born: May 14, 1940 Pasig, Rizal, Commonwealth of the Philippines
- Died: November 22, 2011 (aged 71) Sacramento, California, U.S.
- Listed height: 6 ft 2 in (1.88 m)
- Listed weight: 216 lb (98 kg)

Career information
- College: San Beda
- PBA draft: 1975
- Drafted by: Toyota Super Corollas
- Playing career: 1960–1977
- Position: Center
- Number: 4
- Coaching career: 1977–1987

Career history

Playing
- 1960–1968: Ysmael Steel Admirals
- 1968–1972: Meralco Reddy Kilowatts
- 1973–1976: Toyota Comets
- 1977: Mariwasa Honda

Coaching
- 1977–1982: Mariwasa Honda; Finance, Inc. Galerie Dominique
- 1984–1987: Al Manama Sports Club
Medals
Men's basketball
Representing Philippines
ABC Championship
Gold medal – first place	1963 Taipei	Team
Silver medal – second place	1965 Kuala Lumpur	Team
Gold medal – first place	1967 Seoul	Team
Silver medal – second place	1971 Tokyo	Team
Gold medal – first place	1973 Manila	Team
Asian Games
Gold medal – first place	1962 Jakarta	Team

Alberto C. Reynoso (May 14, 1940 – November 22, 2011), also known by his nickname "Big Boy" Reynoso, was a professional basketball player from the Philippines.

During the 1960s to 1970s, Reynoso played in the amateur basketball tournament of the Manila Industrial and Commercial Athletic Association. He later played in the professional Philippine Basketball Association from its formation in 1975 to his retirement. Though standing only 6'2", he was selected numerous times to play the center position on the country's national basketball team.
