= Mark Madsen (basketball) =

American basketball player and coach (born 1976)

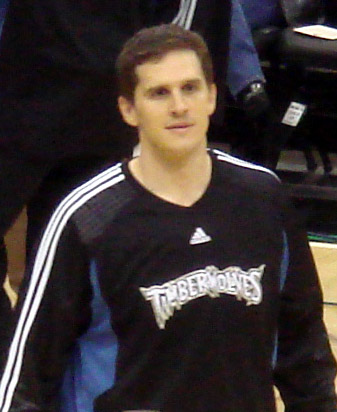
- Madsen with the Minnesota Timberwolves in 2008

California Golden Bears
- Title: Head coach
- League: Atlantic Coast Conference

Personal information
- Born: January 28, 1976 (age 50) Walnut Creek, California, U.S.
- Listed height: 6 ft 9 in (2.06 m)
- Listed weight: 245 lb (111 kg)

Career information
- High school: San Ramon Valley (Danville, California)
- College: Stanford (1996–2000)
- NBA draft: 2000: 1st round, 29th overall pick
- Drafted by: Los Angeles Lakers
- Playing career: 2000–2009
- Position: Power forward / center
- Number: 35
- Coaching career: 2009–present

Career history

Playing
- 2000–2003: Los Angeles Lakers
- 2003–2009: Minnesota Timberwolves

Career highlights
- As player: 2× NBA champion (2001, 2002); Third-team All-American – NABC (1999); 2× First-team All-Pac-10 (1999, 2000); As coach: 2× WAC regular season champion (2021, 2023); WAC Coach of the Year (2023)

Career NBA statistics
- Points: 975 (2.2 ppg)
- Rebounds: 1,157 (2.6 rpg)
- Assists: 181 (0.4 apg)
- Stats at NBA.com
- Stats at Basketball Reference
Medals
Men's basketball
Representing United States
Goodwill Games
| Gold medal – first place | 2001 Brisbane | National team |
Summer Universiade
| Gold medal – first place | 1999 Palma | National team |

Mark Ellsworth Madsen (born January 28, 1976) is an American basketball coach and former NBA player who is the head coach of the California Golden Bears of the Atlantic Coast Conference (ACC). Due to his hustle and physical style of play, he received the nickname "Mad Dog" while playing for the San Ramon Valley High School Wolves, and the moniker continued during his time with the Stanford Cardinal and beyond. He played professionally in the National Basketball Association (NBA) with the Los Angeles Lakers, winning two NBA championships. He also played for the Minnesota Timberwolves.

== College career ==
Madsen played NCAA basketball at Stanford, where he finished his career ranked in the school's career top 10 in blocks and rebounds. In addition, Madsen helped the Cardinal to four NCAA tournament appearances, including a Final Four berth in 1998. Perhaps his signature moment at Stanford was his dunk and free throw that gave Stanford a lead over Rhode Island, propelling the team into the Final Four, where it lost to eventual champion Kentucky. Madsen was a two-time All-American and a two-time All-Pac-10 selection.

== Professional career ==
=== Los Angeles Lakers (2000–2003) ===
The Los Angeles Lakers selected Madsen in the first round (29th pick overall) of the 2000 NBA draft. He contributed to the Lakers' NBA championships in 2001 and 2002, and became well known for his goofy dances at the victory parades for those championships.

Talking about his prime with the Lakers, Shaquille O'Neal said that the only player who could thwart him from his dominant play was Madsen. "He used to beat me up in practice", O'Neal said.

=== Minnesota Timberwolves (2003–2009) ===
Madsen signed with the Timberwolves as a free agent on a two-year, minimum contract before the start of the 2003–04 NBA season. He played six seasons for the Wolves, after re-signing on a five-year, $12.1 million deal following the 2004–05 season.

On July 20, 2009, Madsen was traded to the Los Angeles Clippers along with Craig Smith and Sebastian Telfair in exchange for Quentin Richardson. On August 21, 2009, he was waived by the Clippers.

Madsen's final NBA game was played on April 15, 2009, in a 90–97 loss to the Sacramento Kings. In his final game, Madsen was the team's starting power forward, but he played for only 9 1/2 minutes and recorded no stats. His career averages were 2.2 points, 2.6 rebounds, and 0.4 assists in 11.8 minutes played per game.

== Coaching career ==
=== Los Angeles D-Fenders (2013) ===
Following being waived, Madsen was hired as the assistant coach for the Utah Flash of the NBA Development League (D-League). In 2012, he was hired as an assistant coach at Stanford. On May 13, 2013, he was named head coach of the Los Angeles D-Fenders, a D-League team owned by the Los Angeles Lakers.

=== Los Angeles Lakers (2013-2019) ===
On July 19, 2013, Madsen was promoted to a player development coach position with the Lakers. On September 16, 2014, Madsen was promoted to full-fledged assistant coach by Byron Scott. After Byron Scott was dismissed as head coach of the Lakers, new head coach Luke Walton retained Madsen as assistant coach on July 1, 2016.

=== Utah Valley (2019–2023) ===
Madsen was hired as the head coach at Utah Valley University on April 14, 2019.

=== California (2023–present) ===
Madsen was hired as the head coach at the University of California, Berkeley on March 29, 2023. Madsen is the 19th men's basketball head coach in Cal history. On March 12, 2024, Madsen signed a two-year contract extension through the 2029–30 season. His salary for the 2025-2026 season is $2.8 million.

== Personal life ==
Madsen is a member of the Church of Jesus Christ of Latter-day Saints. Madsen speaks Spanish, acquiring the language from a two-year mission abroad in Málaga, Spain on behalf of his church following his graduation from high school.

As a youth, Madsen attained the rank of Eagle Scout and credits Scouting with teaching him about leadership, character and mentoring.

In fall 2010, Madsen enrolled in the Stanford Graduate School of Business. In June 2012, he received an M.B.A. degree with a Certificate in Public Management.

Madsen married Hannah Harkness on September 3, 2016. The Madsens have three boys and two daughters.

== NBA career statistics ==
Legend
| GP | Games played | GS | Games started | MPG | Minutes per game |
| FG% | Field goal percentage | 3P% | 3-point field goal percentage | FT% | Free throw percentage |
| RPG | Rebounds per game | APG | Assists per game | SPG | Steals per game |
| BPG | Blocks per game | PPG | Points per game | **Bold** | Career high |
| † | Won an NBA championship |

=== Regular season ===
| Year | Team | GP | GS | MPG | FG% | 3P% | FT% | RPG | APG | SPG | BPG | PPG |
|---|---|---|---|---|---|---|---|---|---|---|---|---|
| 2000–01† | L.A. Lakers | 70 | 3 | 9.2 | .487 | **1.000** | **.703** | 2.2 | .3 | .1 | .1 | 2.0 |
| 2001–02† | L.A. Lakers | 59 | 5 | 11.0 | .452 | .000 | .648 | 2.7 | **.7** | .3 | .2 | 2.8 |
| 2002–03 | L.A. Lakers | 54 | **22** | 14.5 | .423 | – | .590 | 2.9 | **.7** | .3 | **.4** | 3.2 |
| 2003–04 | Minnesota | **72** | 12 | **17.3** | .495 | .000 | .483 | **3.8** | .4 | **.5** | .3 | **3.6** |
| 2004–05 | Minnesota | 41 | 14 | 14.7 | .515 | – | .500 | 3.1 | .4 | .2 | .3 | 2.1 |
| 2005–06 | Minnesota | 62 | 7 | 10.9 | .409 | .000 | .426 | 2.3 | .2 | .4 | .3 | 1.2 |
| 2006–07 | Minnesota | 56 | 0 | 8.4 | **.535** | – | .517 | 1.6 | .2 | .2 | .2 | 1.1 |
| 2007–08 | Minnesota | 20 | 6 | 7.6 | .158 | – | .250 | 1.9 | .2 | .2 | .1 | .5 |
| 2008–09 | Minnesota | 19 | 1 | 6.1 | .214 | – | .000 | .9 | .2 | .1 | .1 | .3 |
| Career | | 453 | 70 | 11.8 | .457 | .063 | .527 | 2.6 | .4 | .3 | .2 | 2.2 |

=== Playoffs ===
| Year | Team | GP | GS | MPG | FG% | 3P% | FT% | RPG | APG | SPG | BPG | PPG |
|---|---|---|---|---|---|---|---|---|---|---|---|---|
| 2001† | L.A. Lakers | 13 | 0 | 3.7 | .077 | – | **.600** | .8 | .3 | .0 | **.2** | .4 |
| 2002† | L.A. Lakers | 7 | 0 | 1.4 | .000 | .000 | – | .3 | .0 | .0 | .0 | .0 |
| 2003 | L.A. Lakers | 12 | **2** | **14.1** | .419 | .000 | .438 | 2.3 | **1.0** | **.3** | **.2** | **2.8** |
| 2004 | Minnesota | **17** | 0 | 13.1 | **.531** | – | .448 | **3.4** | .1 | **.3** | **.2** | **2.8** |
| Career | | 49 | 2 | 9.2 | .403 | .000 | .460 | 2.0 | .4 | .2 | .2 | 1.7 |

== Head coaching record ==
=== College ===
Record table
| Season | Team | Overall | Conference | Standing | Postseason |
|---|---|---|---|---|---|
Utah Valley Wolverines (Western Athletic Conference) (2019–2023)
| 2019–20 | Utah Valley | 11–19 | 5–10 | 8th | |
| 2020–21 | Utah Valley | 11–11 | 9–4 | T–1st^{1} | |
| 2021–22 | Utah Valley | 20–12 | 10–8 | 7th | |
| 2022–23 | Utah Valley | 28–9 | 15–3 | 1st | NIT Semifinals |
| Utah Valley: | | 70–51 (.579) | 39–25 (.609) | | |
California Golden Bears (Pac-12 Conference) (2023–2024)
| 2023–24 | California | 13–19 | 9–11 | T–6th | |
California Golden Bears (Atlantic Coast Conference) (2024–present)
| 2024–25 | California | 14–19 | 6–14 | 15th | |
| 2025–26 | California | 22–12 | 9–9 | T–9th | NIT Second Round |
| California: | | 49–50 (.495) | 24–34 (.414) | | |
| Total: | | 119–101 (.541) | | | |
National champion Postseason invitational champion Conference regular season champion Conference regular season and conference tournament champion Division regular season champion Division regular season and conference tournament champion Conference tournament champion

1. Due to irregularities in the WAC standings due to cancelled games resulted from the ongoing COVID-19 pandemic throughout the season, Utah Valley and Grand Canyon were declared co-champions in the regular season as both teams had 9 wins in conference play. This was contrary to the fact Utah Valley finished with one extra loss and thus an inferior winning percentage in conference play.
