= Dick Edwards (basketball) =

Biographical details
- Born: June 21, 1930; Hannibal, Missouri, U.S.
- Died: January 31, 1981 (aged 50); Billings, Montana, U.S.

Coaching career (HC unless noted)
- 1957–1960: Yreka HS
- 1963–1972: Pacific (CA)
- 1972–1978: California
- 1978–1981: Eastern Montana

Head coaching record
- Overall: 304–182 (college)
- Tournaments: 2–4 (NCAA University Division)

Accomplishments and honors

Championships
- 2 Frontier regular season (1979, 1980)

Awards
- 3× WCAC Coach of the Year (1966, 1967, 1971)

Dick Edwards (June 21, 1930 – January 31, 1981) was an American basketball coach. He served as head basketball coach at the University of the Pacific in Stockton California, the University of California, Berkeley, and at Eastern Montana College—now known as Montana State University Billings—compiling a career college basketball coaching record of 304–182. Edward was born on June 21, 1930, in Hannibal, Missouri. He died on January 31, 1981, at the age of 50, after suffering an apparent heart attack in Billings, Montana.

== Head coaching record ==
=== College ===
Record table
| Season | Team | Overall | Conference | Standing | Postseason |
|---|---|---|---|---|---|
Pacific Tigers (NCAA University Division independent) (1963–1971)
| 1963–64 | Pacific | 15–11 | | | |
| 1964–65 | Pacific | 13–12 | | | |
| 1965–66 | Pacific | 22–6 | | | NCAA University Division Regional Fourth Place |
| 1966–67 | Pacific | 24–4 | | | NCAA University Division Regional Runner-up |
| 1967–68 | Pacific | 17–9 | | | |
| 1968–69 | Pacific | 17–9 | | | |
| 1969–70 | Pacific | 21–6 | | | |
| 1970–71 | Pacific | 22–6 | | | NCAA University Division Regional Third Place |
Pacific Tigers (Pacific Coast Athletic Association) (1971–1972)
| 1971–72 | Pacific | 17–9 | 8–4 | 2nd | |
| Pacific: | | 168–72 | 8–4 | | |
California Golden Bears (Pacific-8 Conference) (1972–1978)
| 1972–73 | California | 11–15 | 4–10 | 7th | |
| 1973–74 | California | 9–17 | 3–11 | T–7th | |
| 1974–75 | California | 17–9 | 7–7 | 4th | |
| 1975–76 | California | 13–13 | 4–10 | 6th | |
| 1976–77 | California | 12–15 | 7–7 | 6th | |
| 1977–78 | California | 11–16 | 4–10 | 7th | |
| California: | | 73–85 | 26–55 | | |
Eastern Montana Yellowjackets (Frontier Conference) (1978–1981)
| 1978–79 | Eastern Montana | 19–10 | 11–1 | 1st | |
| 1979–80 | Eastern Montana | 23–8 | 12–0 | 1st | |
| 1980–81 | Eastern Montana | 21–7 | | | |
| Eastern Montana: | | 63–25 | 23–1 | | |
| Total: | | 304–182 | | | |
National champion Postseason invitational champion Conference regular season champion Conference regular season and conference tournament champion Division regular season champion Division regular season and conference tournament champion Conference tournament champion
