= California Golden Bears men's basketball =

College men's basketball team representing the University of California, Berkeley

2026–27 California Golden Bears men's basketball team
- University: University of California, Berkeley
- First season: 1907–08; 119 years ago
- Athletic director: Jay Larson and Jenny Simon-O'Neill
- Head coach: Mark Madsen; 4th season, 48–48 (.500)
- Location: Berkeley, California
- Arena: Haas Pavilion (capacity: 11,877)
- NCAA division: Division I
- Conference: ACC
- Nickname: Golden Bears
- Colors: Blue and gold
- Student section: The Bench
- All-time record: 1707–1317 (.564)
- NCAA tournament record: 20–19 (.513)

NCAA Division I tournament champions
- 1959
Other NCAA Division I tournament results
Runner-up	1960
Final Four	1946, 1959, 1960
Elite Eight	1946, 1957, 1958, 1959, 1960
Sweet Sixteen	1957, 1958, 1959, 1960, 1993, 1997
Appearances	1946, 1957, 1958, 1959, 1960, 1990, 1993, 1994, 1996*, 1997, 2001, 2002, 2003, 2006, 2009, 2010, 2012, 2013, 2016

NIT champions
- 1999

Conference regular-season champions
- PCC: 1916, 1921, 1924, 1925, 1926, 1927, 1929, 1932, 1944, 1946, 1957, 1958, 1959 Pac-12: 1960, 2010

Conference division champions
- PCC South: 1923, 1924, 1925, 1926, 1927, 1928, 1929, 1931, 1932, 1939, 1944, 1946, 1948, 1953

Uniforms
Home	Away	Alternate
- * vacated by NCAA

The California Golden Bears men's basketball team is the men's college basketball team representing the University of California, Berkeley, in NCAA Division I, currently playing in the Atlantic Coast Conference (ACC). The program has seen success throughout the years, culminating in a national championship in 1959 under coach Pete Newell, and the team has reached the final four two other times, in 1946 and 1960.

The team plays its home games at Haas Pavilion, which was long known as Harmon Gym before being heavily renovated with money donated in part by the owners of Levi Strauss & Co. The arena was originally known as Men's Gymnasium, then as Harmon Gymnasium until the late 1990s, when it went through renovations which displaced the team for two seasons.

== History ==
The Golden Bears first played basketball intercollegiate in 1907 and began full conference play in 1915. The 1920s was the dominant decade for Cal basketball, as the Bears won six conference titles under coaches E.H. Wright and Nibs Price. Cal was retroactively ranked as the nation's top college team for the 1926–27 season by the Premo-Porretta Power Poll; however, this retroactive poll is not recognized by the NCAA.

Nibs Price coached Cal with great success for 30 years from 1924 to 1954, earning a 449–294 total record, many single season winning records, and an additional three conference titles in the 1930s and 1940s. (Note: Price was also Cal's football coach from 1926 to 1930, leading the 1926 and 1927 Wonder Teams to undefeated seasons.)

Cal reached the pinnacle of the sport during the tenure of Pete Newell, who was head coach from 1955 to 1960. The Golden Bears earned the conference title four out of his five years and in 1959, won the NCAA title. In Newell's last year, Cal came close to another NCAA title, but lost to Ohio State in the final.

The fortunes of Cal men's basketball would never be the same after 1960. Newell retired after the national title win, touching off what would be a mostly dreary quarter-century for the program. From 1960 to 1985, the Bears tallied only two winning seasons in conference play. This was despite having players such as Butch Hays (1981–1984) and Kevin Johnson (1983–1987) who both set school records for assists, with Johnson also setting the school's all-time scoring record at the time of his graduation.

Lou Campanelli served as head coach from 1986 to 1993. The highlight of this era was a 75–67 victory over UCLA in 1986 that ended a 25-year, 52 game losing streak to the Bruins. Also in that first season, Campanelli took the Golden Bears to the 1986 National Invitation Tournament, the first post-season appearance of any sort since 1960. In 1990, Campanelli led the Golden Bears to their first NCAA Tournament in 30 years.

Cal achieved much better success in the 1990s, qualifying for the NCAA tournament five times with future NBA players Jason Kidd (the Golden Bears all-time assists leader) and Lamond Murray, as well as future perennial All-Pro NFL tight end Tony Gonzalez in the early and mid 1990s and Sean Lampley and Shareef Abdur-Rahim in the late 1990s. Cal also won the 1999 National Invitation Tournament, with a thrilling 61–60 victory over Clemson in the title game.

This success came amid a brief period of turmoil in the mid-1990s. Campanelli was fired midway through the 1992–93 season after athletic director Bob Bockrath heard Campanelli berate his players with obscenity-laden tirades following two losses. Assistant Todd Bozeman finished out the season, and was named permanent head coach after leading the Bears to an upset of two-time defending champion Duke in the NCAA Tournament. Bozeman himself was pushed out two months before the 1996–97 season after it emerged that he'd funneled $30,000 over two years to the parents of star recruit Jelani Gardner so they could make the drive to see their son play. Ultimately, the Bears were docked four scholarships over two years and forfeited the entire 1994–95 season and all but one game of the 1995–96 season.

Ben Braun took over for Bozeman just before the 1996–97 season. Inheriting a team expected to be barely competitive in the Pac-10, Braun led the Bears to a second-place finish and took them all the way to the Sweet 16. During Braun's 12-year tenure, Cal qualified for the NCAA tournament three straight times in the 2000s and six times overall. However, after finishing near the bottom of the Pac-10 for the second straight year, Braun was dismissed in late March 2008. The former coach of rival Stanford, Mike Montgomery, succeeded Braun. In his first year the Bears finished tied for third in the Pac-10 and made it to the NCAA tournament, where they were eliminated in the first round to the Maryland Terrapins. In 2006, the Golden Bears reached their first Pacific Life Pac-10 Men's Basketball Tournament championship game. Power forward Leon Powe grabbed a tournament-record 20 rebounds against USC in the first round and then scored a tournament-record 41 points in a double-overtime victory versus Oregon in the semi-finals. Despite California's 71–52 loss to UCLA in the final game, Powe was named Most Valuable Player for the tournament.

In Montgomery's second season, the Bears won their first conference title in 50 years. The team, featuring four seniors as starters, only lost one game at Haas Pavilion but had a rough non-conference schedule featuring losses to elite teams such as Kansas, Ohio State, and Syracuse, which quickly knocked them out of the national rankings after being ranked #13 in the pre-season. Despite losing the Pac-10 tournament, and questions on whether even the conference champion of a down Pac-10 conference would receive an at-large bid to the tournament, the Bears qualified for their second straight NCAA bid as a #8 seed. They one-upped their previous season by winning their first round matchup against the Louisville Cardinals but fell to the eventual national champions, Duke, in the second round. Senior Jerome Randle finished the season and his career as Cal's all-time leading scorer. The highlight of Montgomery's last season as the head coach for Cal was the signature win at home against then undefeated, No. 1 Arizona. In thrilling fashion, senior guard Justin Cobbs hits the game-winning jumper with 0.9 on the clock for a 60–58 victory.

Mike Montgomery announced his retirement shortly after the 2013–14 season's culmination, resulting in the hiring of Cuonzo Martin. The Bears went 18–15 in Martin's first season as head coach. On April 13, 2015, 5-star power forward Ivan Rabb of Bishop O'Dowd High School announced he would attend Cal. A little more than 2 weeks later, 5-star small forward Jaylen Brown announced he too would attend Cal, making this recruiting class the best in Cal history. While the team had a solid regular season, earning a #4 seed in the NCAA tournament, they were upset in the first round by Hawaii. After three seasons, Martin announced his resignation to become the head coach at Missouri. Shortly thereafter, Martin's assistant coach Wyking Jones became Cal's 17th head basketball coach. Jones coached for only two years, with the team finishing in the last place of the Pac-12 during both seasons.

Former Georgia head coach Mark Fox was named Cal's 18th head basketball coach in 2019. Fox continued the Bears' inferiority, with a 38–87 record and 17–61 in conference play. His last season produced a 3–29 record, the worst winning percentage (.093) in Cal history. Attendance plunged from 5,627 in Fox's first year to 2,155, the lowest attendance of any power conference school. Former Stanford forward and Los Angeles Laker Mark Madsen became the head coach in 2023. Madsen improved the Bears to a 13–19 record and signed an extension to the 2029–30 season.

== Coaches ==
No.	Head coach	Years	Win–loss	Pct.
1	Patrick Kilduff	1915–1916	11–5	.688
2	Ben Cherrington	1916–1917	15–1	.938
3	Walter Christie	1917–1918	8–2	.800
4	William Hollender	1918–1920	14–8	.636
5	E. H. Wright	1920–1924	60–20	.750
6	Nibs Price	1924–1954	449–294	.604
7	Pete Newell	1954–1960	119–44	.730
8	Rene Herrerias	1960–1968	92–100	.479
9	Jim Padgett	1968–1972	52–53	.495
10	Dick Edwards	1972–1978	73–85	.462
11	Dick Kuchen	1978–1985	80–112	.417
12	Lou Campanelli	1985–1993	123–108	.532
13	Todd Bozeman	1993–1996	63–35	.643
14	Ben Braun	1996–2008	219–154	.578
15	Mike Montgomery	2008–2014	130–73	.640
16	Cuonzo Martin	2014–2017	62–39	.614
17	Wyking Jones	2017–2019	16–47	.254
18	Mark Fox	2019–2023	38–87	.304
19	Mark Madsen	2023–present	49–50	.495

== Postseason ==
=== NCAA tournament results ===
The Golden Bears have appeared in 19 NCAA tournaments. They were national champions in 1959 and their combined record is 20–19.

Year	Seed	Round	Opponent	Result
1946		Elite Eight; Final Four; National 3rd Place	Colorado; Oklahoma A&M; Ohio State	W 50–44; L 35–52; L 45–63
1957		Round of 23; Sweet Sixteen; Elite Eight	Bye; BYU; San Francisco	— W 86–59; L 46–50
1958		Round of 24; Sweet Sixteen; Elite Eight	Bye; Idaho State #18 Seattle	— W 54–43; L 62–66 ^{OT}
1959		Round of 23; Sweet Sixteen; Elite Eight; Final Four; Championship	Bye #18 Utah; Saint Mary's #5 Cincinnati #10 West Virginia	— W 71–53; W 66–46; W 64–58; W 71–70
1960		Round of 25; Sweet Sixteen; Elite Eight; Final Four; Championship	Idaho State; Santa Clara; Oregon #1 Cincinnati #3 Ohio State	W 71–44; W 69–49; W 70–49; W 77–69; L 55–75
1990	9 E	Round of 64; Round of 32	(8) Indiana (1) #4 Connecticut	W 65–63; L 54–74
1993	6 M	Round of 64; Round of 32; Sweet Sixteen	(11) LSU (3) #10 Duke (2) #9 Kansas	W 66–64; W 82–77; L 76–93
1994	5 W	Round of 64	(12) Green Bay	L 57–61
1996	12 M	Round of 64	(5) #17 Iowa State	L 64–74
1997	5 E	Round of 64; Round of 32; Sweet Sixteen	(12) Princeton (4) #20 Villanova (1) #4 North Carolina	W 55–52; W 75–68; L 57–63
2001	8 S	Round of 64	(9) Fresno State	L 70–82
2002	6 S	Round of 64; Round of 32	(11) Penn (3) #9 Pittsburgh	W 82–75; L 50–63
2003	8 E	Round of 64; Round of 32	(9) NC State (1) #3 Oklahoma	W 76–74 ^{OT} L 65–74
2006	7 S	Round of 64	(10) NC State	L 52–58
2009	7 W	Round of 64	(10) Maryland	L 71–84
2010	8 S	Round of 64; Round of 32	(9) Louisville (1) #3 Duke	W 77–62; L 53–68
2012	12 M	First Four	(12) South Florida	L 54–65
2013	12 E	Round of 64; Round of 32	(5) UNLV (4) #16 Syracuse	W 64–61; L 60–66
2016	4 S	Round of 64	(13) Hawaii	L 66–77

=== NIT results ===
The Golden Bears have appeared in nine National Invitation Tournaments (NIT). Their combined record is 15–9. They were NIT champions in 1999.

Year	Round	Opponent	Result
1986	First Round	Loyola Marymount	L 75–80
1987	First Round; Second Round; Quarterfinals	Cal State Fullerton; Oregon State; Arkansas–Little Rock	W 72–68; W 65–62; L 73–80
1989	First Round; Second Round	Hawaiʻi; Connecticut	W 73–57; L 72–73
1999	First Round; Second Round; Quarterfinals; Semifinals; Championship	Fresno State; DePaul; Colorado State; Oregon; Clemson	W 79–71; W 58–57; W 71–62; W 85–69; W 61–60
2000	First Round; Second Round; Quarterfinals	Long Beach State; Georgetown; Wake Forest	W 70–66; W 60–49; L 59–76
2008	First Round; Second Round	New Mexico; Ohio State	W 68–66; L 56–73
2011	First Round; Second Round	Ole Miss; Colorado	W 77–74; L 72–89
2014	First Round; Second Round; Quarterfinals	Utah Valley; Arkansas; SMU	W 70–52; W 75–64; L 65–67
2017	First Round	Cal State Bakersfield	L 66–73
2026	First Round; Second Round	UIC; Saint Joseph's	W 91–73; L 75–76

- Conference rules (PCC / Pac-8) disallowed participation until 1973.

== Notable players ==
=== Retired numbers ===
California Golden Bears retired numbers
No.	Player	Position	Career	No. retired	Refs.
4	Alfred Grigsby	F	1991–97	1997	
5	Jason Kidd	G	1992–94	2004	
11	Kevin Johnson	G	1983–87	1992	
40	Darrall Imhoff	C	1957–60	2009	

=== All-Americans ===
Player	Year(s)	Team(s)
George Hjelte	1917	Consensus First Team – Helms (1st)
George Dixon	1926	Consensus First Team – Helms (1st)
George Dixon	1927	Consensus First Team – Helms (1st)
Vern Corbin	1929	Consensus First Team –Helms (1st), College Humor (2nd), Christy Walsh Syndicate (1st)
Harold Eifart	1934	Helms (1st)
Bob Herwig	1936	College Humor (2nd)
Andy Wolfe	1946	Helms (2nd)
Andy Wolfe	1948	Consensus Second Team – Helms (1st), Converse (3rd)
Bob Matheny	1954	Look (3rd)
Bob McKeen	1955	INS (2nd)
Larry Friend	1957	AP (3rd)
Darrall Imhoff	1960	Consensus First Team – AP (1st), USBWA (1st), NABC (1st), UPI (1st), NEA (1st), Sporting News (1st)
Mark McNamara	1982	UPI (3rd)
Jason Kidd	1994	Consensus First Team – AP (1st), USBWA (1st), NABC (1st), UPI (1st)
Lamond Murray	1994	Consensus Second Team – AP (3rd), USBWA (2nd), NABC (3rd), UPI (3rd)
Shareef Abdur-Rahim	1996	AP (3rd), NABC (3rd)
Ed Gray	1997	AP (3rd), NABC (3rd)
Leon Powe	2006	Consensus Second Team – AP (2nd), USBWA (2nd), Sporting News (2nd)
Ryan Anderson	2008	Sporting News (2nd)
Jerome Randle	2010	Sporting News (4th)
Allen Crabbe	2013	NABC (3rd), Sporting News (3rd)

=== Golden Bears in international leagues ===
- Shahar Gordon, played in the Israel Basketball Premier League and for the Israeli national basketball team
- Butch Hays, after being drafted by the Chicago Bulls of the NBA played in the National Basketball League (Australia) from 1991 to 2003

=== Golden Bears notable in other fields ===
- Tony Gonzalez, Pro Football Hall of Fame tight end for the Kansas City Chiefs and Atlanta Falcons, played forward from 1994 to 1997
- Solomon Hughes, professor and actor most known for playing Kareem Abdul-Jabbar in the HBO series Winning Time: The Rise of the Lakers Dynasty, played from 1998 to 2002
