= Jim Padgett =

American basketball coach

James Lee Padgett (November 4, 1930 – December 19, 2009) was an American basketball coach. He died of congestive heart failure at 79 years old. He served as head coach at University of California, Berkeley from 1968 to 1972. Padgett coached the University of Nevada from 1972-76. Padgett compiled a 43-61 record in four seasons at Nevada. During his time at Nevada, he coached his son, Pete, who went on to record 1,464 rebounds. This total places Pete in the top 10 all-time in the NCAA's modern era (since 1972–73).

The elder Padgett's legacy continues to the present, as Jim's grandson and Pete's son David, a former player at Kansas and Louisville, is currently in coaching. David began that phase of his career as a strength coach at Louisville before becoming an assistant at IUPUI from 2011 to 2014. He returned to Louisville in 2014 and then the program's director of basketball operations. After the firing of Coach Rick Pitino, David was named to the position of interim head coach.
