= Dick Kuchen =

American basketball coach

Dick Kuchen (born June 22, 1944) is an American basketball coach. He served as head coach at University of California, Berkeley from 1978 to 1985. He then served as the head coach at Yale University from 1986 to 1999. Kuchen served as assistant coach with the 1978 Notre Dame Final Four team.

In 2005 Kuchen was inducted into the Rider College Sports Hall of Fame.
