= Pete Newell =

American college men's basketball coach

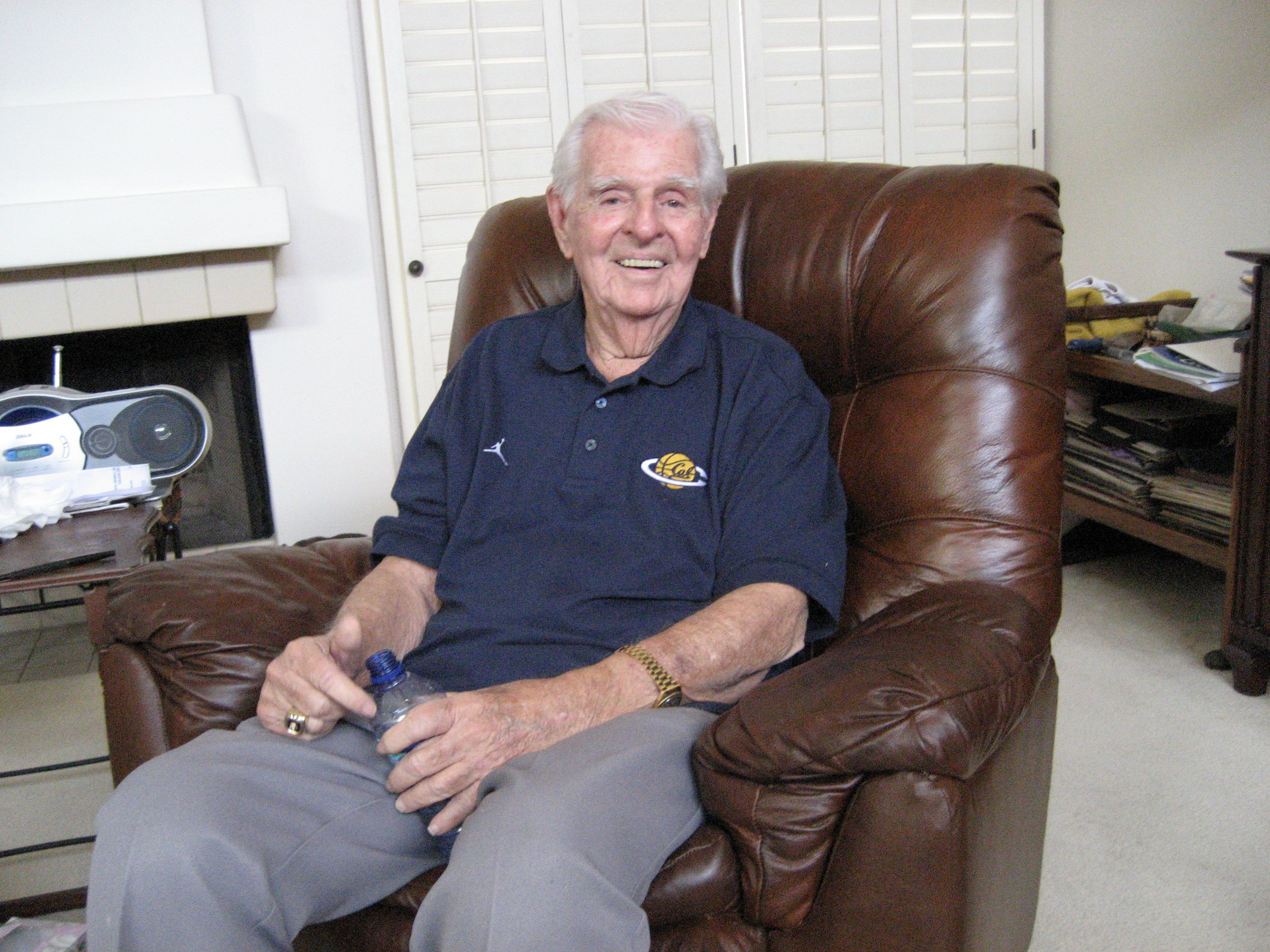
- Newell in 2007

Biographical details
- Born: August 31, 1915; Vancouver, British Columbia, Canada
- Died: November 17, 2008 (aged 93); Rancho Santa Fe, California, U.S.

Playing career

Basketball
- 1939: Loyola Marymount

Coaching career (HC unless noted)

Basketball
- 1946–1950: San Francisco
- 1950–1954: Michigan State
- 1954–1960: California

Baseball
- 1946–1950: San Francisco

Administrative career (AD unless noted)
- 1960–1968: California
- 1968–1971: San Diego Rockets (GM)
- 1972–1976: Los Angeles Lakers (GM)

Head coaching record
- Overall: 233–123 (basketball)

Accomplishments and honors

Championships
- Basketball; NCAA University Division tournament (1959); 2 NCAA University Division Regional—Final Four (1959, 1960); NIT (1949); 3 PCC regular season (1957–1959); AAWU regular season (1960)

Awards
- Henry Iba Award (1960); NABC Coach of the Year (1960); UPI Coach of the Year (1960); FIBA Hall of Fame (2009)
- Basketball Hall of Fame; Inducted in 1979
- College Basketball Hall of Fame; Inducted in 2006
Medal record
Head Coach for United States
Olympic Games
Gold medal – first place	1960 Rome	Team

Peter Francis Newell (August 31, 1915 – November 17, 2008) was an American college men's basketball coach and basketball instructional coach. He coached for 15 years at the University of San Francisco, Michigan State University, and the University of California, Berkeley, compiling an overall record of 234 wins and 123 losses.

He led California to the NCAA title in 1959, and a year later coached the gold medal-winning U.S. team at the 1960 Summer Olympics, a team that would be inducted as a unit to the Naismith Memorial Basketball Hall of Fame in 2010. After his coaching career ended, he ran a world-famous instructional basketball camp and served as a consultant and scout for several National Basketball Association (NBA) teams.

== Early life ==
Born in Vancouver, British Columbia, Newell grew up in Los Angeles, California. Encouraged by his mother, he had small roles in several movies before he turned ten. It is even said that Charlie Chaplin considered him for the title role in his film The Kid (1921), which was later played by Jackie Coogan.

Newell graduated from St. Agnes High School and was a classmate of Phil Woolpert at Loyola University of Los Angeles (now Loyola Marymount University), and played on its basketball and baseball teams.

== Coaching career ==
After serving in the United States Navy from 1942 to 1946, Newell was appointed head men's basketball coach at the University of San Francisco in 1946. During his four-year tenure at USF, Newell compiled a 70–37 record and coached the Dons to the 1949 National Invitation Tournament championship. In 1950 he accepted an appointment as head coach at Michigan State University, where he stayed until 1954.

Newell returned to the West Coast in 1954 when he was hired as head coach at the University of California, Berkeley. Newell was very successful at Cal, compiling a 119–44 (.730) record, winning four consecutive PCC/AAWU titles from 1957 to 1960, and leading the Golden Bears to two straight appearances in the NCAA tournament championship game—which they won in 1959. Newell himself earned national Coach of the Year honors in 1960. At Berkeley, he became a faculty initiate of the Nu chapter of Phi Kappa Tau fraternity where player Darrall Imhoff was a member.

Newell also coached the U.S. men's Olympic basketball team to a gold medal in the 1960 Summer Olympics in Rome, leading a talented squad that featured future National Basketball Association (NBA) stars and Hall of Famers Walt Bellamy, Oscar Robertson, Jerry West, and Jerry Lucas. His win in the Olympics made him one of only three coaches to win the "Triple Crown" of NIT, NCAA, and Olympic championships. Newell is also known to have introduced the reverse-action offense in the late 1950s.

After being advised by doctors to give up coaching because of stress, he served as the Athletic Director at Cal from 1960 to 1968.

Among his various achievements includes having a slight winning record against UCLA head coach John Wooden, their head-to-head record was 10–9 (.526) in Newell's favor; he is considered by some to be the greatest coach in college basketball history.

== NBA work ==
After retiring from coaching, Newell served as team executive or scout for several National Basketball Association (NBA) teams. He served as general manager of the San Diego Rockets from 1968 to 1971, until the team was sold to Houston in June, 1971. After a short stint in Houston, to assist with the transfer, Pete returned to the west coast and later joined the Los Angeles Lakers. As general manager of the Lakers, he was instrumental in trading for star center Kareem Abdul-Jabbar from the Milwaukee Bucks. He served as the Director of Player Development for the NBA. He retired from his job as Lakers general manager in 1976 to spend more time with his ailing wife.

Wayne Embry, who in 1994 became the first African American team president in any major sport (with the Cleveland Cavaliers), said that Newell helped with Embry's transition into the new position by being welcoming toward Embry and respecting his position, with race not being a factor in how Newell perceived him.

== Basketball camps ==
Considered "America's Basketball Guru", Newell conducted an annual training camp for centers and forwards known simply as "Big Man Camp", which has since been informally dubbed "Pete Newell's Big Man Camp". The camp originated when word spread that Newell was working with Kermit Washington. After Washington's game rapidly improved, more and more big men started to work with Newell, and he later opened the camp. The camp's impressive participants list features over 200 current and former NBA players. Newell attracted this list of players due to his reputation of teaching footwork, being what one publication described as "The Footwork Master". Former attendees include Shaquille O'Neal, Hakeem Olajuwon, Bill Walton, and many others. The camp was almost seen as standard for players coming out of college into the NBA; according to ESPN's Ric Bucher, "[f]or the past 24 years, every big man of any significance has spent at least one summer week trying to get close enough to Pete." From the time Newell opened the camp in 1976 until his death, he never accepted any money for his services, stating that "I owe it to the game. I can never repay what the game has given me." The camp has taken place in Honolulu, Hawaii and most recently Las Vegas, Nevada.

In 2001 Newell opened his version of the Big Man Camp for women and dubbed it "Pete Newell's Tall Women's Basketball Camp" with the following simple sentence serving as a summary of its intentions: "The Pete Newell Tall Women's Basketball Camp goal is to continue to do what Pete Newell has done his whole life-to teach the fundamentals and footwork of the game of basketball to young players."

== Personal life ==
Newell's wife, Florence, died in 1984. His four sons have all been involved with basketball. His son, Pete Newell Jr., coached the Santa Cruz High School boys' basketball team to the California state championship in 2005. Greg Newell was a longtime executive at Converse. Another son, Tom Newell, is a longtime NBA scout and assistant coach who has recently worked on international basketball projects in China and Russia. Tom currently is a Fox Sports studio commentator in the network's Northwest region. His 3rd son, Roger, was the first person to bring computer software and analytics to the NBA in 1982 thru 2000 with the Newell Productivity System. This same computer software system was used throughout Jim Harrick's tenure at UCLA including their NCAA Championship season. Roger was also a consultant at Hollywood Park racetrack from 1990 to 1999 before the track was sold to Churchill Downs.

== Death ==
Newell died in Rancho Santa Fe, California on November 17, 2008, at age 93.

== Legacy ==
In 1979 Newell was inducted into the Naismith Memorial Basketball Hall of Fame as a contributor, and in 2010 the 1960 Olympic team he coached was inducted into the Hall as a unit. An annual college basketball tournament was held in his honor in Oakland, California, and frequent participants in the Pete Newell Challenge included USF and Cal—the very schools where Newell coached. In addition in 1987 Cal dedicated the court in Harmon Gym as "Pete Newell Court".

In 1999, author Bruce Jenkins published a biography of Newell entitled A Good Man.

Since 2000, the National Association of Basketball Coaches has annually presented the Pete Newell Big Man Award to the top frontcourt player in the nation.

In an interview with Mike Greenberg on ESPN's Mike and Mike in the Morning on January 2, 2007, Bob Knight singled Newell out as one of the greatest coaches in men's college basketball history. Knight stated that although he had not won as many championships as some other coaches he felt "he was as good as anybody who's ever coached this game." Newell's influence on basketball is often stated in what would seem to be almost exaggerated terms by many Hall of Fame coaches and players. However, his contributions to the game of basketball have been so great that according to many Newell has perhaps had as much or more influence on the game of basketball as any person in the modern era.

== Head coaching record ==
=== Basketball ===
Record table
Season	Team	Overall	Conference	Standing	Postseason
San Francisco Dons (NCAA University Division independent) (1946–1950)
1946–47	San Francisco	13–14			
1947–48	San Francisco	13–11			
1948–49	San Francisco	25–5			NIT Champion
1949–50	San Francisco	19–7			NIT first round
San Francisco:		70–37 (.654)			
Michigan State Spartans (Big Ten Conference) (1950–1954)
1950–51	Michigan State	10–11	5–9	7th	
1951–52	Michigan State	13–9	6–8	5th	
1952–53	Michigan State	13–9	11–7	3rd	
1953–54	Michigan State	9–13	4–10	8th	
Michigan State:		45–42 (.517)	26–34 (.433)		
California Golden Bears (Pacific Coast Conference / Athletic Association of Western Universities) (1954–1960)
1954–55	California	9–16	1–11	4th (South)	
1955–56	California	17–8	10–6	3rd	
1956–57	California	21–5	14–2	1st	NCAA University Division regional final
1957–58	California	19–9	12–4	1st	NCAA University Division regional final
1958–59	California	25–4	14–2	1st	NCAA University Division Champion
1959–60	California	28–2	11–1	1st	NCAA University Division Runner-up
California:		119–44 (.730)	62–26 (.705)		
Total:		234–123 (.655)			
National champion Postseason invitational champion Conference regular season champion Conference regular season and conference tournament champion Division regular season champion Division regular season and conference tournament champion Conference tournament champion

== Selected bibliography ==
- Basketball Methods (1962) with John Benington
- Basketball: The Sports Playbook (1976)
- Basketball Post Play (1995)
- Pete Newell's Defensive Basketball: Winning Techniques and Strategies (Art & Science of Coaching) (2001)

== See also ==
- List of NCAA Division I Men's Final Four appearances by coach

== Sources ==
- Chin, Oliver Clyde. The Tao of Yao: Insights from Basketball's Brightest Big Man, California: Frog, LTD. 2003 ISBN 1-58394-090-1
- Mandelbaum, Michael. The Meaning Of Sports: why americans watch baseball, football and basketball and what they see when they do, New York: Public Affairs 2004 ISBN 1-58648-330-7
- Ramsay, Jack and Halberstam, David. Dr. Jack's Leadership Lessons Learned From a Lifetime in Basketball, New Jersey: John Wiley & Sons. 2004 ISBN 0-471-46929-7
