= 2025 Liga Sudamericana de Básquetbol =

28th season of the Liga Sudamericana de Básquetbol

2025 Liga Sudamericana de Baloncesto
- League: Liga Sudamericana de Baloncesto
- Season: 2025
- Duration: 3–29 October 2025 (group phase); November 2025 (Quarterfinals); 6-7 December 2025 (Final Four)
- Teams: 16 (from 8 countries)

Finals
- Champions: (Argentina) Ferro Carril Oeste (1st title)
- Runners-up: (Argentina) Regatas Corrientes
- Third place: (Uruguay) Defensor Sporting
- Fourth place: (Paraguay) Olimpia Kings

Awards
- Season MVP: (Argentina) Eduardo Vasirani (Ferro Carril Oeste)

Statistical leaders
- Points: (United States) Davaunta Thomas (20.7)
- Rebounds: (United States) Elyjah Clark (7.5)
- Assists: (Brazil) Elio Corazza (6.2)
- Index Rating: (United States) Danjel Purifoy (19.8)

The 2025 Liga Sudamericana de Básquetbol, or 2025 FIBA South American Basketball League, was the 28th season of the Liga Sudamericana de Básquetbol (LSB), the second tier of basketball in South America organised by FIBA Americas. The season began on 3 October and ended on 7 December 2025.

Nacional were the defending champions, but they did not defend their title since they qualified for 2025–26 Basketball Champions League Americas.

== Team allocation ==
The list of teams was confirmed on 2 September 2025 by FIBA. The number of teams was increased from 12 to 16.

- 1st, 2nd, etc.: Position in national league
- WC: Wild card
Location of teams of the 2025 Liga Sudamericana de Baloncesto group stage.
Red: Group A; Green: Group B; Yellow: Group C; Blue: Group D.

| (Argentina) Ferro Carril Oeste | (Bolivia) Universitario de Sucre | (Brazil) Vasco da Gama | (Ecuador) CD Jorge Guzmán |
| (Argentina) Quimsa | (Brazil) Bauru | (Chile) Colegio Los Leones | (Paraguay) Olimpia Kings |
| (Argentina) Oberá TC | (Brazil) Corinthians | (Colombia) Motilones del Norte | (Paraguay) San José |
| (Argentina) Regatas Corrientes | (Brazil) Pinheiros | (Ecuador) Importadora Alvarado | (Uruguay) Defensor Sporting |

== Format ==
The format for this LSB season was altered, as in the group phase there will be four groups of four teams. All team will play each other once, for a total of four games per team. The top two ranked teams will advance to the Quarterfinals. In the Quarterfinals, two new groups will be formed, Groups E and F. The qualified teams from Groups A and B will make up Group E, while those from Groups C and D will compete in Group F. There, teams will once again face each opponent once. The top two from each group will move on to the Final 4. The winners of the Semi-Finals in the Final 4 will play for the championship, while the losing teams will battle for third place.

== Group stage ==
Sixteen teams participate in the group phase, in which each team faced the other teams in the group once. Each group tournament are held at the arena of a host team. The two highest-placed teams advance to the quarterfinals phase. Games are played from 3 to 29 October 2025.

=== Group A ===
The games of Group A were played from 3 to 5 October 2025 in Pilar, Paraguay.

| Pos | Team | Pld | W | L | PF | PA | PD | Pts | Qualification |
|---|---|---|---|---|---|---|---|---|---|
| 1 | (Ecuador) CD Jorge Guzmán | 3 | 3 | 0 | 230 | 196 | +34 | 6 | Advance to quarter-finals |
| 2 | (Paraguay) Olimpia Kings (H) | 3 | 2 | 1 | 232 | 220 | +12 | 5 | Advance to quarter-finals |
| 3 | (Argentina) Oberá TC | 3 | 1 | 2 | 218 | 224 | −6 | 4 | |
| 4 | (Brazil) Bauru | 3 | 0 | 3 | 181 | 221 | −40 | 3 | |

Source: FIBA
(H) Hosts

| 3 October 2025 | CD Jorge Guzmán (Ecuador) | 69–60 | (Brazil) Bauru | Pilar |
| 19:10 UTC−3 | Scoring by quarter: 23–14, 16–14, 12–16, 18–16 |
| | Pts: McKinney 22; Rebs: McKinney 8 Asts: McKinney 4 | Boxscore | Pts: Barbosa 19; Rebs: Barbosa 11; Asts: Garcia, V. Mogi 4 | Arena: Polideportivo Roberto Cabañas; Referees: Orlando Varela (HON), Nicolás Flores (PAR), Franco Anselmo (ARG) |

| 3 October 2025 | Olimpia Kings (Paraguay) | 84–78 | (Argentina) Oberá TC | Pilar |
| 21:40 UTC−3 | Scoring by quarter: 19–22, 16–17, 17–16, 32–23 |
| | Pts: Purifoy 28; Rebs: Hinkle 6 Asts: Riveros 4 | Boxscore | Pts: Brocal 21; Rebs: three players 6 Asts: Brocal 4 | Arena: Polideportivo Roberto Cabañas; Referees: Andrés Bartel (URU), Claudio Osorio (CHI), Cooper Toppings (CAN) |

| 4 October 2025 | Olimpia Kings (Paraguay) | 73–80 | (Ecuador) CD Jorge Guzmán | Pilar |
| 19:10 UTC−3 | Scoring by quarter: 23–19, 22–25, 21–15, 7–21 |
| | Pts: Hinkle 24; Rebs: Purifoy 8 Asts: Wood 6 | Boxscore | Pts: McKinney 22; Rebs: Carabalí 9 Asts: Toney 3 | Arena: Polideportivo Roberto Cabañas; Referees: Andrés Bartel (URU), Franco Anselmo (ARG), João Varella (BRA) |

| 4 October 2025 | Bauru (Brazil) | 59–77 | (Argentina) Oberá TC | Pilar |
| 21:40 UTC−3 | Scoring by quarter: 8–20, 21–19, 16–20, 14–18 |
| | Pts: Barbosa 12; Rebs: Barbosa 12; Asts: V. Mogi 5 | Boxscore | Pts: Vorhees 16; Rebs: Vorhees 7 Asts: Andújar 7 | Arena: Polideportivo Roberto Cabañas; Referees: Orlando Varela (HON), Nicolás Flores (PAR), Cooper Toppings (CAN) |

| 5 October 2025 | Olimpia Kings (Paraguay) | 75–62 | (Brazil) Bauru | Pilar |
| 19:10 UTC−3 | Scoring by quarter: 18–12, 20–16, 19–16, 18–18 |
| | Pts: Riveros 18; Rebs: Wood 12; Asts: Wood 8 | Boxscore | Pts: Silva 21; Rebs: Moreira 10; Asts: Eugeniusz 4 | Arena: Polideportivo Roberto Cabañas; Referees: Claudio Osorio (CHI), Orlando Varela (HON), Franco Anselmo (ARG) |

| 5 October 2025 | Oberá TC (Argentina) | 63–81 | (Ecuador) CD Jorge Guzmán | Pilar |
| 21:40 UTC−3 | Scoring by quarter: 9–17, 16–17, 18–26, 20–21 |
| | Pts: Vorhees 17; Rebs: Azpilicueta 8 Asts: three players 2 | Boxscore | Pts: Robinson 25; Rebs: Barahona, Carabalí 7 Asts: Recalde 10 | Arena: Polideportivo Roberto Cabañas; Referees: Andrés Bartel (URU), Nicolás Flores (PAR), João Varella (BRA) |

=== Group B ===
The games of Group B were played from 9 to 11 October 2025 in Sucre, Bolivia.

| Pos | Team | Pld | W | L | PF | PA | PD | Pts | Qualification |
|---|---|---|---|---|---|---|---|---|---|
| 1 | (Argentina) Ferro Carril Oeste | 3 | 3 | 0 | 254 | 146 | +108 | 6 | Advance to quarter-finals |
| 2 | (Bolivia) Universitario de Sucre (H) | 3 | 2 | 1 | 214 | 200 | +14 | 5 | Advance to quarter-finals |
| 3 | (Brazil) Vasco da Gama | 3 | 1 | 2 | 183 | 181 | +2 | 4 | |
| 4 | (Colombia) Motilones del Norte | 3 | 0 | 3 | 108 | 232 | −124 | 3 | |

Source: FIBA
(H) Hosts

| 9 October 2025 | Vasco da Gama (Brazil) | 40–73 | (Argentina) Ferro Carril Oeste | Sucre |
| 18:10 UTC−4 | Scoring by quarter: 14–19, 9–18, 6–22, 11–14 |
| | Pts: Fioravanti 12; Rebs: three players 4 Asts: Oliveira 3 | Boxscore | Pts: Lezcano 19; Rebs: Rodríguez 9 Asts: Martínez 8 | Arena: Polideportivo Garcilazo Sucre; Attendance: 2,000; Referees: Nicolás Flores (PAR), Yezid Carreño (COL), Andrés Bartel (URU) |

| 9 October 2025 | Universitario de Sucre (Bolivia) | 70–38 | (Colombia) Motilones del Norte | Sucre |
| 20:40 UTC−4 | Scoring by quarter: 19–8, 15–5, 10–15, 26–10 |
| | Pts: Brooks 16; Rebs: Peña 9 Asts: Brooks, Gutiérrez 4 | Boxscore | Pts: Yan 15; Rebs: Morales 6 Asts: Morales 2 | Arena: Polideportivo Garcilazo Sucre; Attendance: 3,000; Referees: Juan Fernández (ARG), Orlando Varela (HON), César Gonçalves (BRA) |

| 10 October 2025 | Ferro Carril Oeste (Argentina) | 92–41 | (Colombia) Motilones del Norte | Sucre |
| 18:10 UTC−4 | Scoring by quarter: 21–13, 20–10, 26–7, 25–11 |
| | Pts: Torresi 17; Rebs: Vasirani 11; Asts: Bettiga, Martínez 8 | Boxscore | Pts: Del Rosario 16; Rebs: Abad 8 Asts: Cabeza 2 | Arena: Polideportivo Garcilazo Sucre; Attendance: 2,000; Referees: Andrés Bartel (URU), Orlando Varela (HON), César Gonçalves (BRA) |

| 10 October 2025 | Universitario de Sucre (Bolivia) | 79–73 | (Brazil) Vasco da Gama | Sucre |
| 20:40 UTC−4 | Scoring by quarter: 19–25, 19–15, 24–17, 17–16 |
| | Pts: Peña 23; Rebs: Peña 13; Asts: Brooks 8 | Boxscore | Pts: Magna 19; Rebs: Nunes 12; Asts: Vernizzi 5 | Arena: Polideportivo Garcilazo Sucre; Attendance: 3,500; Referees: Juan Fernández (ARG), Nicolás Flores (PAR), Yezid Carreño (COL) |

| 11 October 2025 | Motilones del Norte (Colombia) | 29–70 | (Brazil) Vasco da Gama | Sucre |
| 18:10 UTC−4 | Scoring by quarter: 8–20, 9–12, 4–18, 8–20 |
| | Pts: Price 8 Rebs: Del Rosario, Yan 6 Asts: Cabeza, Morales 2 | Boxscore | Pts: Nunes 13; Rebs: Bonizioli 8 Asts: Fioravanti, Vernizzi 5 | Arena: Polideportivo Garcilazo Sucre; Attendance: 2,000; Referees: Juan Fernández (ARG), Nicolás Flores (PAR), Orlando Varela (HON) |

| 11 October 2025 | Universitario de Sucre (Bolivia) | 65–89 | (Argentina) Ferro Carril Oeste | Sucre |
| 20:40 UTC−4 | Scoring by quarter: 15–21, 20–23, 10–29, 20–16 |
| | Pts: Peña 14; Rebs: Peña 9 Asts: Gutiérrez 4 | Boxscore | Pts: Rodríguez 21; Rebs: Bettiga 9 Asts: Bettiga 9 | Arena: Polideportivo Garcilazo Sucre; Attendance: 3,500; Referees: Andrés Bartel (URU), Yezid Carreño (COL), César Gonçalves (BRA) |

=== Group C ===
The games of Group C were played from 24 to 26 October 2025 in São Paulo, Brazil.

| Pos | Team | Pld | W | L | PF | PA | PD | Pts | Qualification |
|---|---|---|---|---|---|---|---|---|---|
| 1 | (Uruguay) Defensor Sporting | 3 | 2 | 1 | 258 | 244 | +14 | 5 (Note: Head-to-head point difference: Defensor Sporting +3, Corinthians −1, Quimsa −2.) | Advance to quarter-finals |
| 2 | (Brazil) Corinthians (H) | 3 | 2 | 1 | 272 | 266 | +6 | 5 | Advance to quarter-finals |
| 3 | (Argentina) Quimsa | 3 | 2 | 1 | 262 | 235 | +27 | 5 | |
| 4 | (Ecuador) Importadora Alvarado | 3 | 0 | 3 | 238 | 285 | −47 | 3 | |

Source: FIBA
(H) Hosts
Notes:

| 24 October 2025 | Quimsa (Argentina) | 78–76 | (Uruguay) Defensor Sporting | São Paulo |
| 17:10 UTC−3 | Scoring by quarter: 24–13, 19–13, 17–29, 18–21 |
| | Pts: Robinson 15; Rebs: Lema 6 Asts: Figueredo, Solanas 4 | Boxscore | Pts: Metzger 22; Rebs: Metzger 10; Asts: Terra 6 | Arena: Ginásio Poliesportivo Wlamir Marques; Attendance: 345; Referees: Daniel García (VEN), Carlos Vélez (COL), Nicolas Zivieri (BRA) |

| 24 October 2025 | Corinthians (Brazil) | 96–89(OT) | (Ecuador) Importadora Alvarado | São Paulo |
| 20:10 UTC−3 | Scoring by quarter: 25–14, 19–21, 19–31, 21–18, Overtime: 12–5 |
| | Pts: Thomas 30; Rebs: Corazza 9 Asts: Corazza 8 | Boxscore | Pts: Cave 23; Rebs: Lugli 8 Asts: Lugli 7 | Arena: Ginásio Poliesportivo Wlamir Marques; Attendance: 234; Referees: Juan Fernández (ARG), Krishna Domínguez (MEX), Carlos Pallares (COL) |

| 25 October 2025 | Importadora Alvarado (Ecuador) | 59–88 | (Argentina) Quimsa | São Paulo |
| 16:10 UTC−3 | Scoring by quarter: 21–18, 15–20, 7–21, 16–26 |
| | Pts: Lugli 20; Rebs: Lugli 10; Asts: Lugli 3 | Boxscore | Pts: Robinson 26; Rebs: Lema 8 Asts: Figueredo, Orresta 5 | Arena: Ginásio Poliesportivo Wlamir Marques; Referees: Daniel García (VEN), Carlos Vélez (COL), Julirys Guzmán (PUR) |

| 25 October 2025 | Corinthians (Brazil) | 76–81 | (Uruguay) Defensor Sporting | São Paulo |
| 19:10 UTC−3 | Scoring by quarter: 30–21, 15–20, 11–22, 20–18 |
| | Pts: Thomas 25; Rebs: Novaes 11; Asts: Clark 7 | Boxscore | Pts: Metzger 30; Rebs: Metzger 11; Asts: Soto, Wilson 4 | Arena: Ginásio Poliesportivo Wlamir Marques; Attendance: 456; Referees: Juan Fernández (ARG), Krishna Domínguez (MEX), Carlos Pallares (COL) |

| 26 October 2025 | Defensor Sporting (Uruguay) | 101–90(OT) | (Ecuador) Importadora Alvarado | São Paulo |
| 16:10 UTC−3 | Scoring by quarter: 27–27, 20–13, 18–26, 23–22, Overtime: 13–2 |
| | Pts: Wilson 26; Rebs: Colmenares 12; Asts: Metzger 5 | Boxscore | Pts: Alaekwe 20; Rebs: Cárdenas 9 Asts: Lugli 8 | Arena: Ginásio Poliesportivo Wlamir Marques; Attendance: 100; Referees: Juan Fernández (ARG), Nicolas Zivieri (BRA), Julirys Guzmán (PUR) |

| 26 October 2025 | Corinthians (Brazil) | 100–96(OT) | (Argentina) Quimsa | São Paulo |
| 19:10 UTC−3 | Scoring by quarter: 16–28, 25–18, 28–21, 20–22, Overtime: 11–7 |
| | Pts: Clark 35; Rebs: Novaes 9 Asts: Corazza 5 | Boxscore | Pts: Robinson 24; Rebs: Meyinsse 9 Asts: Orresta 10 | Arena: Ginásio Poliesportivo Wlamir Marques; Attendance: 233; Referees: Daniel García (VEN), Carlos Vélez (COL), Krishna Domínguez (MEX) |

=== Group D ===
The games of Group D were played from 27 to 29 October 2025 in Asunción, Paraguay.

| Pos | Team | Pld | W | L | PF | PA | PD | Pts | Qualification |
|---|---|---|---|---|---|---|---|---|---|
| 1 | (Paraguay) San José (H) | 3 | 2 | 1 | 220 | 243 | −23 | 5 (Note: San José 81–77 Regatas Corrientes) | Advance to quarter-finals |
| 2 | (Argentina) Regatas Corrientes | 3 | 2 | 1 | 221 | 211 | +10 | 5 | Advance to quarter-finals |
| 3 | (Brazil) Pinheiros | 3 | 1 | 2 | 253 | 219 | +34 | 4 (Note: Pinheiros 96–55 Colegio Los Leones) | |
| 4 | (Chile) Colegio Los Leones | 3 | 1 | 2 | 194 | 215 | −21 | 4 | |

Source: FIBA
(H) Hosts
Notes:

| 27 October 2025 | Regatas Corrientes (Argentina) | 77–75(OT) | (Brazil) Pinheiros | Asunción |
| 17:40 UTC−3 | Scoring by quarter: 17–14, 21–19, 17–16, 13–19, Overtime: 9–7 |
| | Pts: Penha, Santos 15; Rebs: Santos 8 Asts: Sloan 9 | Boxscore | Pts: Corbalán 18; Rebs: three players 5 Asts: Gramajo 6 | Arena: Polideportivo León Coundou; Referees: Andrés Bartel (URU), Nicolás Flores (PAR), Carmelo de la Rosa (PUR) |

| 27 October 2025 | San José (Paraguay) | 52–84 | (Chile) Colegio Los Leones | Asunción |
| 20:10 UTC−3 | Scoring by quarter: 16–22, 13–22, 7–16, 16–24 |
| | Pts: Benítez 13; Rebs: Benítez 7 Asts: Aliende 5 | Boxscore | Pts: Rebolledo 15; Rebs: four players 4 Asts: Herrera 6 | Arena: Polideportivo León Coundou; Referees: Johnny Batista (PUR), Roberto Fernández (CRC), Aline García (URU) |

| 28 October 2025 | Colegio Los Leones (Chile) | 55–67 | (Argentina) Regatas Corrientes | Asunción |
| 17:40 UTC−3 | Scoring by quarter: 21–14, 15–11, 11–17, 8–25 |
| | Pts: Gaddy 18; Rebs: Fleming 8 Asts: Jones 3 | Boxscore | Pts: Corbalán 18; Rebs: Aguirre 8 Asts: Jaime 6 | Arena: Polideportivo León Coundou; Referees: Johnny Batista (PUR), Nicolás Flores (PAR), Carmelo de la Rosa (PUR) |

| 28 October 2025 | San José (Paraguay) | 87–82 | (Brazil) Pinheiros | Asunción |
| 20:10 UTC−3 | Scoring by quarter: 17–17, 27–18, 24–14, 19–33 |
| | Pts: Wrighten 25; Rebs: Peralta, Picton 8 Asts: Dose, Peralta 5 | Boxscore | Pts: de Souza 22; Rebs: Djalo 8 Asts: de Souza 4 | Arena: Polideportivo León Coundou; Referees: Andrés Bartel (URU), Roberto Fernández (CRC), Aline García (URU) |

| 29 October 2025 | Pinheiros (Brazil) | 96–55 | (Chile) Colegio Los Leones | Asunción |
| 17:40 UTC−3 | Scoring by quarter: 30–11, 19–21, 21–9, 26–14 |
| | Pts: Penha 31; Rebs: Santos 10; Asts: de Souza 8 | Boxscore | Pts: Gaddy 15; Rebs: Bieshaar 5 Asts: Herrera, Jones 3 | Arena: Polideportivo León Coundou; Referees: Andrés Bartel (URU), Roberto Fernández (CRC), Nicolás Flores (PAR) |

| 29 October 2025 | San José (Paraguay) | 81–77 | (Argentina) Regatas Corrientes | Asunción |
| 20:10 UTC−3 | Scoring by quarter: 24–24, 14–17, 21–21, 22–15 |
| | Pts: Barber 19; Rebs: Barber, Peralta 8 Asts: Vallejos 4 | Boxscore | Pts: Gramajo 19; Rebs: Jaime 7 Asts: Jaime 7 | Arena: Polideportivo León Coundou; Referees: Johnny Batista (PUR), Carmelo de la Rosa (PUR), Aline García (URU) |

== Quarterfinals ==
The eight teams which advanced from the group phase played in this stage and were split into two groups, in which each team faced the other teams in the group once. Each group tournament was held at the arena of a host team. The two highest-placed teams advance to the Final 4.

=== Group E ===
The games of Group E were played from 7 to 9 November 2025 in Capiatá, Paraguay.

| Pos | Team | Pld | W | L | PF | PA | PD | Pts | Qualification |
|---|---|---|---|---|---|---|---|---|---|
| 1 | (Argentina) Ferro Carril Oeste | 3 | 3 | 0 | 275 | 203 | +72 | 6 | Advance to Final Four |
| 2 | (Paraguay) Olimpia Kings (H) | 3 | 2 | 1 | 277 | 246 | +31 | 5 | Advance to Final Four |
| 3 | (Ecuador) CD Jorge Guzmán | 3 | 1 | 2 | 237 | 232 | +5 | 4 | |
| 4 | (Bolivia) Universitario de Sucre | 3 | 0 | 3 | 179 | 287 | −108 | 3 | |

Source: FIBA
(H) Hosts

| 7 November 2025 | Ferro Carril Oeste (Argentina) | 84–69 | (Ecuador) CD Jorge Guzmán | Capiatá |
| 17:40 UTC−3 | Scoring by quarter: 20–16, 24–19, 20–19, 20–15 |
| | Pts: Torresi 14; Rebs: Vasirani 9 Asts: Gallegos 5 | Boxscore | Pts: McKinney 22; Rebs: De Vaughn 10; Asts: Recalde 5 | Arena: Polideportivo Cooperativa Capiatá; Referees: Andrés Bartel (URU), Carlos Vélez (COL), Fernando Leite (BRA) |

| 7 November 2025 | Olimpia Kings (Paraguay) | 109–65 | (Bolivia) Universitario de Sucre | Capiatá |
| 20:40 UTC−3 | Scoring by quarter: 31–26, 21–20, 27–5, 30–14 |
| | Pts: Purifoy 19; Rebs: three players 6 Asts: Riveros 7 | Boxscore | Pts: Calvo 17; Rebs: Petković 16; Asts: Brooks, Calvo 4 | Arena: Polideportivo Cooperativa Capiatá; Referees: Daniel García (VEN), Alan dos Santos (BRA), Claudio Osorio (CHI) |

| 8 November 2025 | Universitario de Sucre (Bolivia) | 59–102 | (Argentina) Ferro Carril Oeste | Capiatá |
| 17:40 UTC−3 | Scoring by quarter: 15–18, 5–26, 27–25, 12–33 |
| | Pts: Brooks 21; Rebs: Arguello 12; Asts: Brooks, Calvo 3 | Boxscore | Pts: Defelippo 27; Rebs: Bettiga 7 Asts: Bettiga 9 | Arena: Polideportivo Cooperativa Capiatá; Referees: Carlos Vélez (COL), Fernando Leite (BRA), Claudio Osorio (CHI) |

| 8 November 2025 | Olimpia Kings (Paraguay) | 93–92 | (Ecuador) CD Jorge Guzmán | Capiatá |
| 20:40 UTC−3 | Scoring by quarter: 25–28, 21–17, 24–29, 23–18 |
| | Pts: Hinkle 23; Rebs: Riveros 7 Asts: Riveros 8 | Boxscore | Pts: McKinney 26; Rebs: McKinney 7 Asts: Recalde, Robinson 5 | Arena: Polideportivo Cooperativa Capiatá; Referees: Daniel García (VEN), Alan dos Santos (BRA), Edwin Quiles (PUR) |

| 9 November 2025 | CD Jorge Guzmán (Ecuador) | 76–65 | (Bolivia) Universitario de Sucre | Capiatá |
| 17:40 UTC−3 | Scoring by quarter: 13–7, 17–13, 25–10, 21–25 |
| | Pts: Robinson 17; Rebs: Mainoldi 10; Asts: Recalde 7 | Boxscore | Pts: Petković 25; Rebs: Petković 17; Asts: Brooks 6 | Arena: Polideportivo Cooperativa Capiatá; Referees: Daniel García (VEN), Fernando Leite (BRA), Edwin Quiles (PUR) |

| 9 November 2025 | Olimpia Kings (Paraguay) | 75–89 | (Argentina) Ferro Carril Oeste | Capiatá |
| 20:40 UTC−3 | Scoring by quarter: 24–15, 11–27, 17–21, 23–26 |
| | Pts: Purifoy 16; Rebs: França 10; Asts: three players 3 | Boxscore | Pts: Defelippo 15; Rebs: Vasirani 8 Asts: Gallegos 8 | Arena: Polideportivo Cooperativa Capiatá; Referees: Andrés Bartel (URU), Alan dos Santos (BRA), Claudio Osorio (CHI) |

=== Group F ===
The games of Group F were played from 14 to 16 November 2025 in Asunción, Paraguay.

| Pos | Team | Pld | W | L | PF | PA | PD | Pts | Qualification |
|---|---|---|---|---|---|---|---|---|---|
| 1 | (Argentina) Regatas Corrientes | 3 | 3 | 0 | 229 | 197 | +32 | 6 | Advance to Final Four |
| 2 | (Uruguay) Defensor Sporting | 3 | 2 | 1 | 195 | 192 | +3 | 5 | Advance to Final Four |
| 3 | (Brazil) Corinthians | 3 | 1 | 2 | 217 | 227 | −10 | 4 | |
| 4 | (Paraguay) San José (H) | 3 | 0 | 3 | 209 | 234 | −25 | 3 | |

Source: FIBA
(H) Hosts

| 14 November 2025 | Corinthians (Brazil) | 66–72 | (Argentina) Regatas Corrientes | Asunción |
| 17:10 UTC−3 | Scoring by quarter: 14–14, 17–16, 21–22, 14–20 |
| | Pts: Novaes 16; Rebs: Clark, Novaes 9 Asts: Corazza 5 | Boxscore | Pts: Santos 19; Rebs: Santos 10; Asts: four players 3 | Arena: Polideportivo León Coundou; Referees: Johnny Batista (PUR), Carlos Vélez (COL), Roberto Fernández (CRC) |

| 14 November 2025 | San José (Paraguay) | 54–64 | (Uruguay) Defensor Sporting | Asunción |
| 20:10 UTC−3 | Scoring by quarter: 12–8, 14–20, 21–22, 7–14 |
| | Pts: Wrighten 14; Rebs: Barber, Vallejos 6 Asts: Sharpe, Wrighten 2 | Boxscore | Pts: Terra 17; Rebs: three players 7 Asts: Colmenares, Metzger 3 | Arena: Polideportivo León Coundou; Referees: Roberto Vázquez (PUR), Daniel García (VEN), Orlando Varela (HON) |

| 15 November 2025 | Regatas Corrientes (Argentina) | 72–56 | (Uruguay) Defensor Sporting | Asunción |
| 16:40 UTC−3 | Scoring by quarter: 22–13, 19–18, 22–16, 9–9 |
| | Pts: Corbalán 12; Rebs: Santos 9 Asts: Jaime 7 | Boxscore | Pts: Metzger 13; Rebs: Metzger 9 Asts: Terra 6 | Arena: Polideportivo León Coundou; Referees: Johnny Batista (PUR), Daniel García (VEN), Yezid Carreño (COL) |

| 15 November 2025 | San José (Paraguay) | 80–85 | (Brazil) Corinthians | Asunción |
| 19:40 UTC−3 | Scoring by quarter: 22–25, 13–20, 23–21, 22–19 |
| | Pts: Barber, Wrighten 14; Rebs: Barber 6 Asts: Vallejos 5 | Boxscore | Pts: Thomas 20; Rebs: De Almeida 10; Asts: Corazza 9 | Arena: Polideportivo León Coundou; Referees: Roberto Vázquez (PUR), Carlos Vélez (COL), Orlando Varela (HON) |

| 16 November 2025 | Defensor Sporting (Uruguay) | 75–66 | (Brazil) Corinthians | Asunción |
| 16:40 UTC−3 | Scoring by quarter: 27–14, 15–17, 16–16, 17–19 |
| | Pts: Weaver 29; Rebs: Colmenares, Wright II 9 Asts: Terra 5 | Boxscore | Pts: Clark, Thomas 15; Rebs: Clark 9 Asts: Corazza 6 | Arena: Polideportivo León Coundou; Referees: Johnny Batista (PUR), Daniel García (VEN), Orlando Varela (HON) |

| 16 November 2025 | San José (Paraguay) | 75–85 | (Argentina) Regatas Corrientes | Asunción |
| 19:40 UTC−3 | Scoring by quarter: 16–23, 22–23, 22–20, 15–19 |
| | Pts: Peralta 20; Rebs: Peralta 8 Asts: Picton 4 | Boxscore | Pts: Chiarini 14; Rebs: Jaime 14; Asts: Aguirre 5 | Arena: Polideportivo León Coundou; Referees: Carlos Vélez (COL), Roberto Fernández (CRC), Yezid Carreño (COL) |

== Final Four ==
The Final Four will take place on 6 and 7 December 2025 at the Complejo CONMEBOL SUMA in Luque, Paraguay.

=== Bracket ===
Semifinals
6 December
(Argentina) Ferro Carril Oeste | 80
(Uruguay) Defensor Sporting | 65
6 December
(Argentina) Regatas Corrientes | 64
(Paraguay) Olimpia Kings | 62

Final
7 December
(Argentina) Ferro Carril Oeste | 85
(Argentina) Regatas Corrientes | 68
Third place game
7 December
(Uruguay) Defensor Sporting | 98
(Paraguay) Olimpia Kings | 63

=== Semifinals ===
| 6 December 2025 | Ferro Carril Oeste (Argentina) | 80–65 | (Uruguay) Defensor Sporting | Luque |
| 17:10 | Scoring by quarter: 23–9, 17–16, 20–26, 20–14 |
| | Pts: Lezcano 20; Rebs: Vasirani 8 Asts: Gallegos 7 | Boxscore | Pts: Carrera 25; Rebs: Carrera 8 Asts: Carrera 5 | Arena: Complejo CONMEBOL SUMA; Referees: Daniel García (VEN), Alan dos Santos (BRA), Julirys Guzmán (PUR) |

| 6 December 2025 | Regatas Corrientes (Argentina) | 64–62 | (Paraguay) Olimpia Kings | Luque |
| 19:40 | Scoring by quarter: 17–17, 8–21, 17–13, 22–11 |
| | Pts: Corbalán 18; Rebs: Ramírez Barrios 9 Asts: Aguirre 4 | Boxscore | Pts: Purifoy 20; Rebs: Purifoy 11; Asts: Peralta 4 | Arena: Complejo CONMEBOL SUMA; Referees: Julio Anaya (PAN), Fernando Leite (BRA), Orlando Varela (HON) |

=== Third place game ===
| 7 December 2025 | Defensor Sporting (Uruguay) | 98–63 | (Paraguay) Olimpia Kings | Luque |
| 17:10 | Scoring by quarter: 21–23, 31–13, 22–17, 24–10 |
| | Pts: Weaver 22; Rebs: Terra 7 Asts: Terra 9 | Boxscore | Pts: Hinkle 13; Rebs: Purifoy 6 Asts: Hinkle 2 | Arena: Complejo CONMEBOL SUMA |

=== Final ===
| 7 December 2025 | Ferro Carril Oeste (Argentina) | 85–68 | (Argentina) Regatas Corrientes | Luque |
| 19:40 | Scoring by quarter: 16–19, 20–18, 33–13, 16–18 |
| | Pts: Vasirani 19; Rebs: Defelippo 8 Asts: Martínez 5 | Boxscore | Pts: Ramírez Barrios 20; Rebs: Ramírez Barrios 10; Asts: Gramajo 5 | Arena: Complejo CONMEBOL SUMA |

=== MVP ===
| Player | Team |
|---|---|
| (Argentina) Eduardo Vasirani | (Argentina) Ferro Carril Oeste |

=== All-Tournament Team ===
| Player | Team |
