= FIBA Basketball World Cup =

Basketball tournament

- Upcoming season or competition: 2027 FIBA Basketball World Cup
- Sport: Basketball
- Founded: 1950; 76 years ago
- First season: 1950
- No. of teams: 32 (finals)
- Countries: FIBA members
- Continent: FIBA (International)
- Most recent champions: Germany (1st title)
- Most titles: United States / Yugoslavia (5 titles each)
- Website: www.fiba.basketball/history

The FIBA Basketball World Cup is an international basketball competition between the senior men's national teams of the members of the International Basketball Federation (FIBA), the sport's global governing body. It takes place every four years and is considered the flagship event of FIBA.

From its inception in 1950 until 2010, the tournament was known as the FIBA World Championship.

The tournament structure is similar, but not identical, to that of the FIFA World Cup; the current format of the tournament involves 32 teams competing for the title at venues within the host nation. The FIBA Basketball World Cup and the FIFA World Cup were played in the same year as each other from 1970 through 2014. A parallel event for women's teams, now known as the FIBA Women's Basketball World Cup, is also held quadrennially. From 1986 through 2014, the men's and women's edition were held in the same year, though in different countries. Following the 2014 FIBA World Cup for men and championships for women, the men's World Cup was scheduled on a new four-year cycle to avoid conflict with the FIFA World Cup. The men's World Cup was held in 2019, in the year following the FIFA World Cup. The women's championship, which was renamed from "FIBA World Championship for Women" to "FIBA Women's Basketball World Cup" after its 2014 edition, will remain on the previous four-year cycle, with championships in the same year as the FIFA World Cup.

The winning team receives the Naismith Trophy, first awarded in 1967. The current champion is Germany, which defeated Serbia in the final of the 2023 tournament.

== History ==
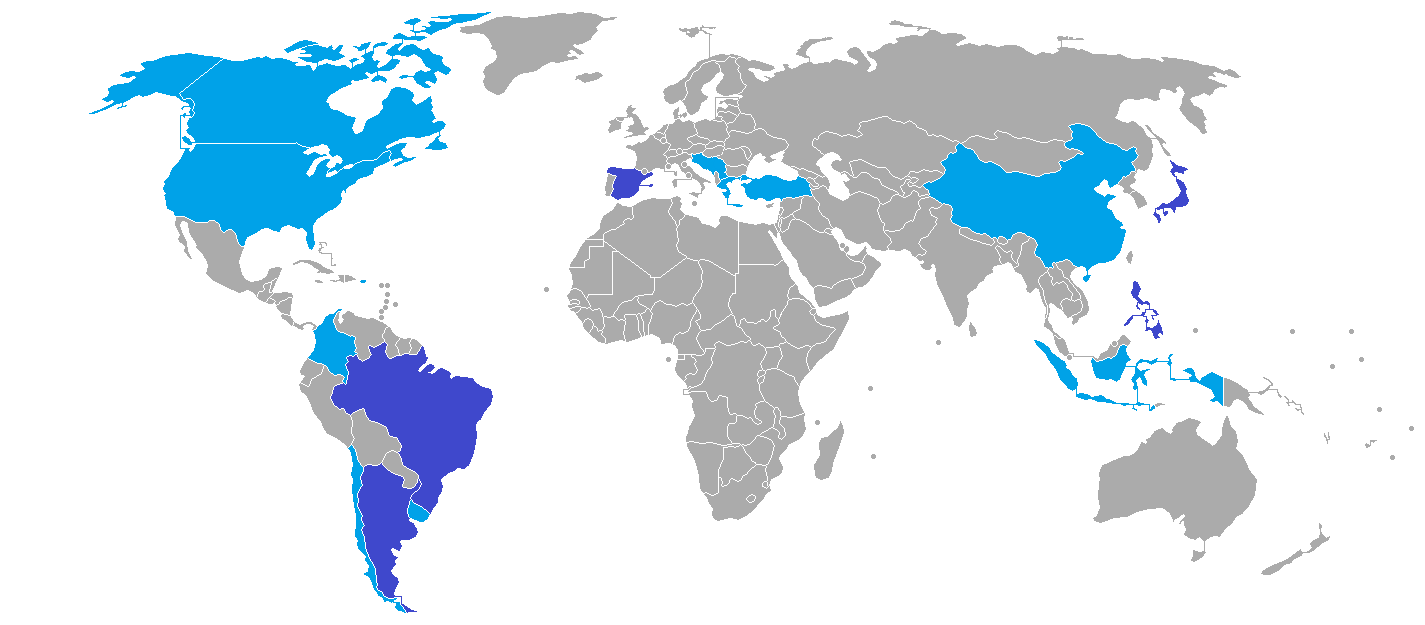
World map depicting the number of times a country has hosted the World Cup. Dark blue: twice; light blue: once.

The FIBA Basketball World Cup was conceived at a meeting of the FIBA World Congress at the 1948 Summer Olympics in London. Long-time FIBA Secretary-General Renato William Jones urged FIBA to adopt a World Championship, similar to the FIFA World Cup, to be held in every four years between Olympiads. The FIBA Congress, seeing how successful the 23-team Olympic tournament was that year, agreed to the proposal, beginning with a tournament in 1950. Argentina was selected as host, largely because it was the only country willing to take on the task. Argentina took advantage of the host selection, winning all their games en route to becoming the first FIBA World Champion.

The first five tournaments were held in South America, and teams from the Americas dominated the tournament, winning eight of nine medals at the first three tournaments. By 1963, however, teams from Eastern Europe and Southeast Europe — the Soviet Union and Yugoslavia, in particular — began to catch up to the teams from the American continents. Between 1963 and 1990, the tournament was dominated by the United States, the Soviet Union, Yugoslavia, and Brazil, which together accounted for every medal at the tournament.

The 1994 FIBA World Championship held in Toronto marked the beginning of a new era, as currently active American NBA players participated in the tournament for the first time (prior to that only European and South American professionals were allowed to participate as they were still classified as amateurs), while the Soviet Union and Yugoslavia split into many new states. The United States dominated that year and won gold, while former states of the USSR and Yugoslavia, Russia and Croatia, won silver and bronze. The 1998 FIBA World Championship, held in Greece (Athens and Piraeus), lost some of its luster when the 1998–99 NBA lockout prevented NBA players from participating. The new Yugoslavian team, now consisting of the former Yugoslav republics of Serbia and Montenegro, won the gold medal over Russia, while the USA, with professional basketball players playing in Europe and two college players, finished third.

In 2002, other nations caught up to the four powerhouse countries and their successor states. FR Yugoslavia, led by Peja Stojaković of the Sacramento Kings and Dejan Bodiroga of FC Barcelona, won the final game against Argentina, while Dirk Nowitzki, who was the tournament's MVP, led Germany to the bronze, its first ever World Championship medal. Meanwhile, the United States team, this time made up of NBA players, struggled to a sixth-place finish. This new era of parity convinced FIBA to expand the tournament to 24 teams for the 2006, 2010, and 2014 editions of the tournament.

In 2006, emerging powerhouse Spain beat Greece in the first appearance in the final for both teams. Spain became only the seventh team (Yugoslavia and FR Yugoslavia are counted separately in the FIBA records) to capture a World Championship gold. The USA, which lost to Greece in a semi-final, won against Argentina in the third-place match and claimed bronze.

In the 2010 FIBA World Championship final, the USA defeated Turkey and won gold for the first time in 16 years, while Lithuania beat Serbia and won bronze. The next time around, the United States became the third country to defend the championship, winning against Serbia at the 2014 edition of the tournament. France beat Lithuania in the bronze medal game.

After the 2014 edition, FIBA instituted significant changes to the World Cup. The final competition was expanded from 24 to 32 teams. Also, for the first time since 1967, the competition would no longer overlap with the FIFA World Cup. To accommodate this change, the 2014 FIBA World Cup was followed by a 2019 edition in China.

Total times teams hosted by confederation Confederations and years italicized & in bold have an upcoming competition.
Confederation	Total	(Hosts) Years
FIBA Africa	0	
FIBA Americas	10	(Argentina) 1950, (Brazil) 1954, (Chile) 1959, (Brazil) 1963, (Uruguay) 1967, (Puerto Rico) 1974, (Colombia) 1982, (Argentina) 1990, (Canada) 1994, (United States) 2002
**FIBA Asia**	5	(Philippines) 1978, (Japan) 2006, (China) 2019, (Indonesia) (Japan) (Philippines) 2023, (Qatar) **2027**
**FIBA Europe**	6	(Socialist Federal Republic of Yugoslavia) 1970, (Spain) 1986, (Greece) 1998, (Turkey) 2010, (Spain) 2014, (France) **2031**

== Qualification ==
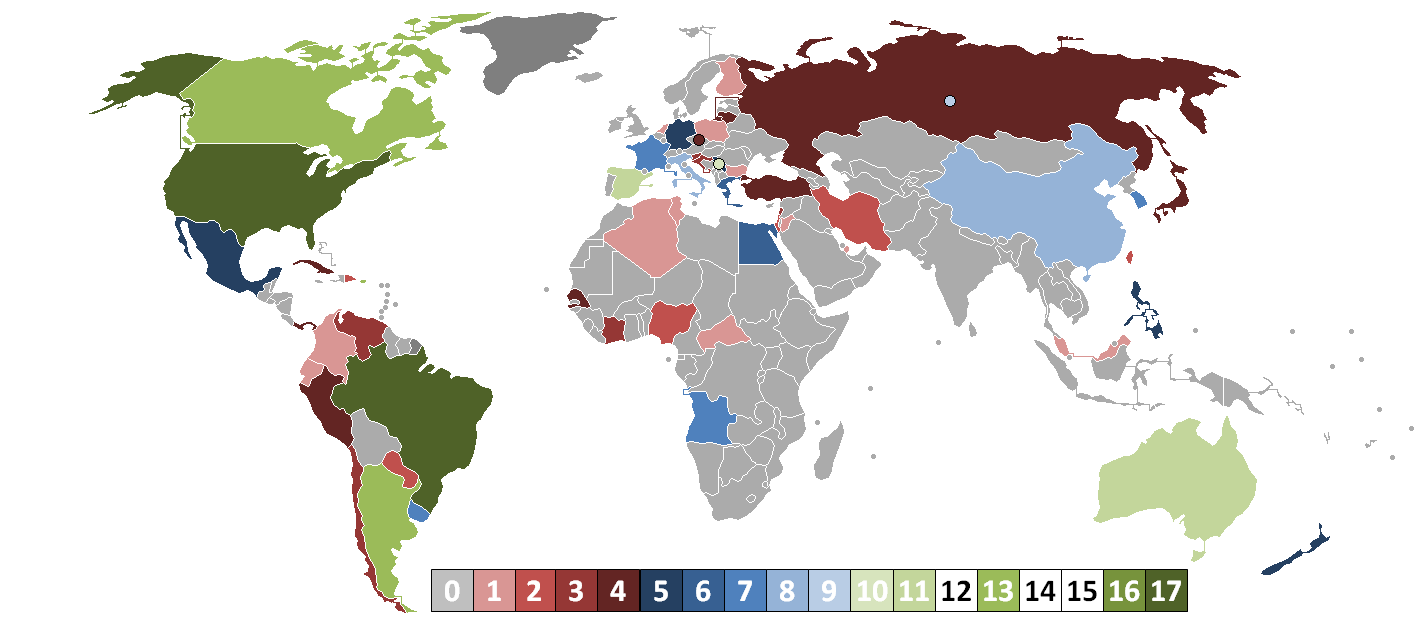
World map depicting the number of times a national team has participated in the World Cup as of 2014.

The Basketball World Cup has used various forms of qualification throughfive tournaments were held in South America and participation was dominated by teams from the Americas. At the first tournament, FIBA intended for the three Olympic medalists to compete, plus the host Argentina and two teams each from Europe, Asia, and South America. However, no Asian team was willing to travel to the event, so six of the ten teams were from the Americas (all three Olympic medalists were from the Americas, plus the zone received two continental berths and an Asia's berth). The former European powerhouse Soviet Union, later made their first tournament appearance in 1959, after missing the first two events.

In the tournament's early years, only Europe and South America had established continental tournaments, so participation in the tournament was largely by invitation. Later, Asia added a continental championship in 1960, followed by Africa in 1962, Central America in 1965, and Oceania in 1971, As a result of these changes, qualification became more formalized starting with the 1967 tournament. In that year, the Asian champion received an automatic berth in the tournament, joining the top European and South American teams. In 1970, the African and Oceanian champion each received a berth, while the Centrobasket champion and runner-up were each invited. For most of these years, the tournament host, defending World Champion, and top Olympic basketball tournament finishers also qualified for the event.

From 1970 through the 2014 World Cup, qualification continued to be based on the continental competitions and the Olympic tournament. The only major change came in the 1990 FIBA World Championship, when the tournament started taking qualifiers from the newly redesigned FIBA Americas Championship rather than from North, Central, and South America individually. After the tournament expanded to 24 teams in 2006, the tournament allocated qualification as follows:

- FIBA EuroBasket (Europe) – 6 berths
- FIBA AfroBasket (Africa) – 3 berths
- FIBA Asia Cup (Asia) – 3 berths
- FIBA AmeriCup (Americas) – 5 berths
- FIBA Oceania Championship (Oceania) – 2 berths
- Defending Olympic Champion – 1 berth, removed from the zone of the Olympic champion
- Host team – 1 berth
- FIBA-selected wild cards – 4 berths

Each of the five continental championships also served as qualification for the Olympics, so all were held every two years. The year immediately preceding the World Championship was used to determine the berths at the tournament. For example, all of the berths at the 2010 FIBA World Championship were determined by continental championships held in 2009. After the first 20 teams qualified, FIBA then selected four wild card teams, based on sporting, economic, and governance criteria, as well as a required registration fee from each team to be considered by the FIBA board. Of the four wild cards, only three could come from one continental zone. In each of the two tournaments that the wild card system was in place, FIBA selected the maximum three European teams to compete in the event.

FIBA instituted major changes to its competition calendar and the qualifying process for both the World Cup and Olympics in 2017.

First, the continental championships are now held once every four years, specifically in years that immediately follow the Summer Olympics. The continental championships no longer play a role in qualifying for either the World Cup or Olympics.

The 2019 World Cup qualifying process, which began in 2017, is the first under a new format. Qualifying takes place over a two-year cycle, involving six windows of play. Qualifying zones mirror the FIBA continental zones, except that FIBA Asia and FIBA Oceania are now combined into a single Asia-Pacific qualifying zone. In each qualifying zone, nations are divided into Division A and Division B, with promotion and relegation between the two. FIBA did not initially reveal full details of the new process, but announced that at least in opening phases, it would feature groups of three or four teams, playing home-and-away within the group. Below is the list of distribution of berths according to each FIBA qualifying zone.

- FIBA Europe – 12 berths
- FIBA Americas – 7 berths
- FIBA Africa – 5 berths
- Asia-Pacific (FIBA Asia and FIBA Oceania) – 7 berths
- Host team – 1 berth

== Tournament format ==
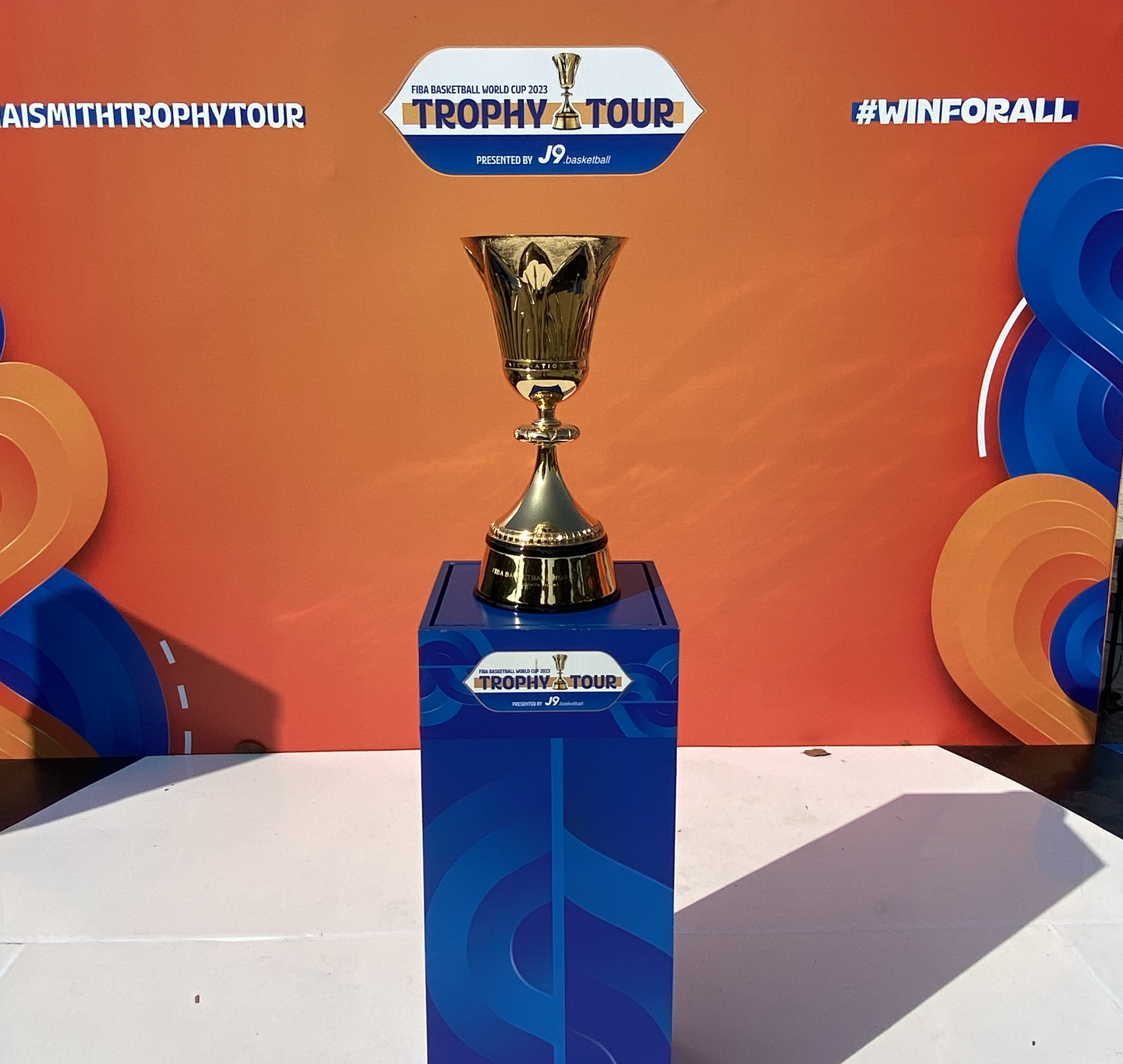
Naismith Trophy

The Basketball World Cup has existed in several different formats throughout the years, as it has expanded and contracted between 10 and 24 teams. The first tournament, in 1950, began with a ten-team double-elimination tournament, followed by a six-team round robin round to determine the champion. Between 1954 and 1974, each tournament started with a group stage preliminary round; the top teams in each preliminary round group then moved on to a final round robin group to determine the champion. In 1978, FIBA added a gold medal game between the top two finishers in the final group and a bronze medal game between the third and fourth place teams. In each year between 1959 and 1982, the host team received a bye into the final group. Of the seven host teams in this era, only three won medals, despite the head start. As a result, FIBA made the host team compete in the preliminary round starting in 1986.

In 1986, the tournament briefly expanded to 24 teams. Four groups of six teams each competed in the preliminary round group stage. The top three teams in each group then competed in the second group stage, followed by a four-team knockout tournament between the top two finishers in each group. The championship contracted back down to 16 teams for the 1990 tournament. The three tournaments between 1990 and 1998 each had two group stages followed by a four-team knockout tournament to determine the medalists. The 2002 tournament expanded the knockout round to eight teams.

In 2006, FIBA made the decision to expand back to 24 teams and introduced the format that was in place through 2014. Under that format, the teams were divided into four preliminary round groups of six teams each. The top 4 teams in each group then advanced to the Round of 16 in a single-elimination knockout round.

In 2019, the final tournament expanded to 32 teams.
If the teams should be tied at the end of the preliminary round, the ties are broken by the following criteria in order:

1. Game results between tied teams
2. Goal average between games of the tied teams
3. Goal average for all games of the tied teams
4. Drawing of lots

The top two teams in each group then advance to a second group-stage round, formed by the top 2 teams from pairs of first-round groups; the match between teams coming from each first-round group carries over as a result in that group, and each plays the 2 teams from the other group. The top 2 teams in each of 4 second-round groups then advance to the quarterfinals in the final, single-elimination round. In that final round, the semifinal losers play in the bronze medal game, while the quarterfinal losers play in a consolation bracket to determine fifth through eighth places.

== Naismith Trophy ==
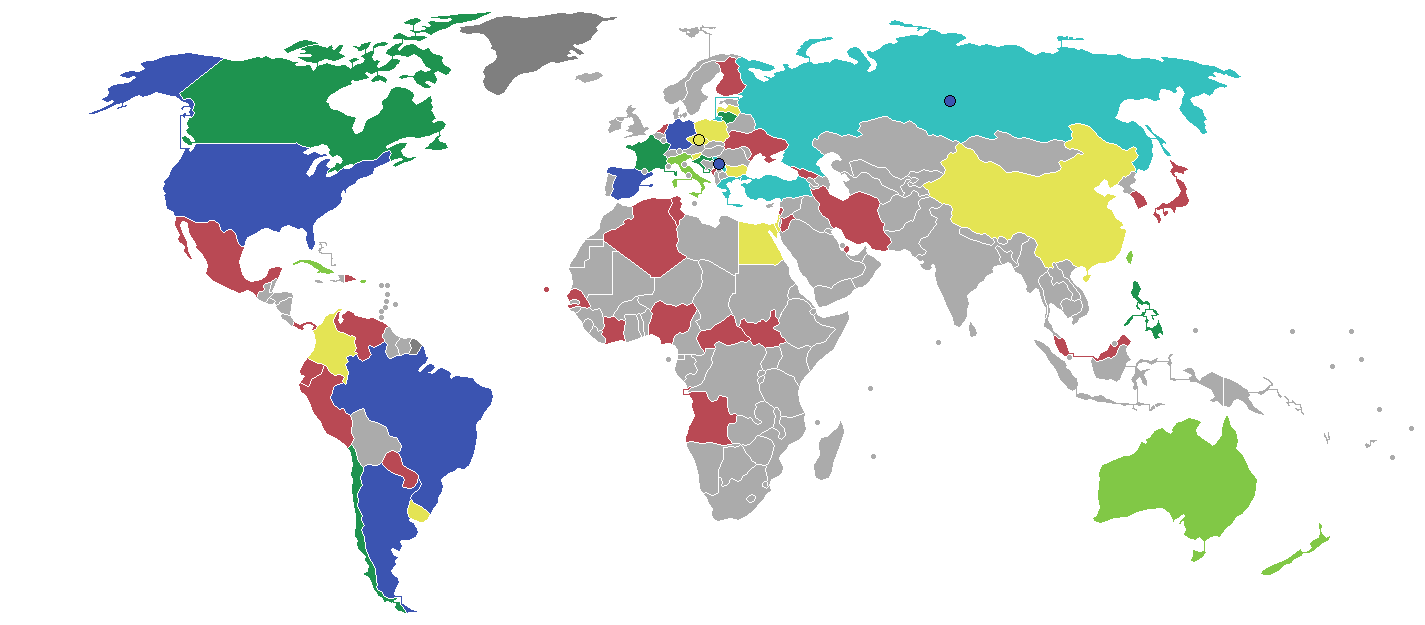
Map of best finishes per team. Defunct countries are denoted by circles.

Since 1967, the champion of each tournament has been awarded the Naismith Trophy, named in honor of basketball's inventor, James Naismith. A trophy had been planned since the first World Championship in 1950, but did not come to fruition until FIBA finally commissioned a trophy in 1965, after receiving a US$1,000 donation. The original trophy was used from 1967 through 1994 and now sits at the Pedro Ferrándiz Foundation in Spain. An updated trophy was introduced for the 1998 FIBA World Championship and the newest version of the trophy was made in 2017 by British silversmith, Thomas Lyte, for the 2019 tournament in China

The second trophy is designed in an Egyptian-inspired lotus shape, upon which there are carved maps of the continents and precious stones symbolizing the five continents (FIBA Americas represents both North America and South America). Dr. Naismith's name is engraved on all four sides in Latin, Arabic, Chinese, and Egyptian hieroglyphs. The trophy stands 47 centimeters (18.5 inches) tall and weighs nine kilograms (twenty pounds).

The most recent Naismith Trophy design was revealed in the 2019 FIBA World Cup Qualifiers Draw Ceremonies, last 7 May 2017. The trophy, which stands about 60 centimeters high (13 cm. higher than the 1998 version), is made almost entirely out of gold, and features the names of the previous world cup champions at the base. FIBA's original name (Federation Internationale de Basketball Amateur) is also engraved at the trophy's "hoop". The trophy was designed by Radiant Studios Ltd, and handcrafted by the silversmith Thomas Lyte.

== Summary ==
Edition	Year	Hosts	Final			Third place game			Number of teams
Edition	Year	Hosts	Champion	Score	Runner-up	Third place	Score	Fourth place	Number of teams
1	1950	Argentina	Argentina	64–50; No playoffs (Note: No final was played; teams played each other once in the final group round-robin; the team with the best record wins the championship.)	United States	Chile	51–40; No playoffs	Brazil	10
2	1954	Brazil	United States	62–41; No playoffs	Brazil	Philippines	66–60; No playoffs	France	12
3	1959	Chile	Brazil	81–67; No playoffs	United States	Chile	86–85; No playoffs	Formosa	13
4	1963	Brazil	Brazil	90–71; No playoffs	Yugoslavia	Soviet Union	75–74; No playoffs	United States	13
5	1967	Uruguay	Soviet Union	71–59; No playoffs	Yugoslavia	Brazil	80–71; No playoffs	United States	13
6	1970	Yugoslavia	Yugoslavia	80–55; No playoffs	Brazil	Soviet Union	62–58; No playoffs	Italy	13
7	1974	Puerto Rico	Soviet Union	79–82; No playoffs	Yugoslavia	United States	83–70; No playoffs	Cuba	14
8	1978	Philippines	Yugoslavia	82–81 (OT); Araneta Coliseum, Quezon City	Soviet Union	Brazil	86–85; Araneta Coliseum, Quezon City	Italy	14
9	1982	Colombia	Soviet Union	95–94; Coliseo El Pueblo, Cali	United States	Yugoslavia	119–117; Coliseo El Pueblo, Cali	Spain	13
10	1986	Spain	United States	87–85; Palacio de Deportes, Madrid	Soviet Union	Yugoslavia	117–91; Palacio de Deportes, Madrid	Brazil	24
11	1990	Argentina	Yugoslavia	92–75; Estadio Luna Park, Buenos Aires	Soviet Union	United States	107–105 (OT); Estadio Luna Park, Buenos Aires	Puerto Rico	16
12	1994	Canada	United States	137–91; SkyDome, Toronto	Russia	Croatia	78–60; SkyDome, Toronto	Greece	16
13	1998	Greece	(Federal Republic of Yugoslavia); FR Yugoslavia	64–62; Olympic Indoor Hall, Athens	Russia	United States	84–61; Olympic Indoor Hall, Athens	Greece	16
14	2002	United States	(Federal Republic of Yugoslavia); FR Yugoslavia	84–77 (OT); Conseco Fieldhouse, Indianapolis	Argentina	Germany	117–94; Conseco Fieldhouse, Indianapolis	New Zealand	16
15	2006	Japan	Spain	70–47; Saitama Super Arena, Saitama	Greece	United States	96–81; Saitama Super Arena, Saitama	Argentina	24
16	2010	Turkey	United States	81–64; Sinan Erdem Dome, Istanbul	Turkey	Lithuania	99–88; Sinan Erdem Dome, Istanbul	Serbia	24
17	2014	Spain	United States	129–92; Palacio de Deportes, Madrid	Serbia	France	95–93; Palacio de Deportes, Madrid	Lithuania	24
18	2019	China	Spain	95–75; Wukesong Arena, Beijing	Argentina	France	67–59; Wukesong Arena, Beijing	Australia	32
19	2023	Philippines; Japan; Indonesia	Germany	83–77; Mall of Asia Arena, Pasay	Serbia	Canada	127–118 (OT); Mall of Asia Arena, Pasay	United States	32
20	2027	Qatar	Future event Lusail Sports Arena, Lusail			Future event Lusail Sports Arena, Lusail			32
21	2031	France	Future event Paris La Défense Arena, Paris			Future event Paris La Défense Arena, Paris			32

(OT): game decided after overtime.

=== Medal table ===
In the most current medal table released by FIBA as seen on the FIBA official website, the 2014 championship is taken into account, and the records of SFR Yugoslavia and FR Yugoslavia are combined under "Yugoslavia".

Previously, FIBA had a medal table from 1950 to 2006, and another medal table that included results from 1950 to 2006, that separated the results of SFR Yugoslavia/FR Yugoslavia and Serbia and Montenegro respectively into "Yugoslavia" or "Serbia and Montenegro". The ranking of teams between the latter two medal tables are different, with the FIBA.com ranking by number of total medals, while the FIBA World Cup website's ranking is by number of gold medals. The number of medals won by the United States differs between the latter two medal tables, despite encompassing the same period. The latter two medal tables also do not include the results of the 2010 and 2014 championships.

Finally, a FIBA.com PDF linked from the FIBA.com history section that documents the championships from 1950 to 2002 also has a medal table that included tournaments from 1950 to 1998, which also separated pre-breakup Yugoslavia, called as "Yusgoslavia" [sic] from the post-breakup Yugoslavia, called as "Serbia and Montenegro", and ranked the teams by the number of total medals.

The FIBA archive also lists the achievements of each national team, separating it per IOC codes. The national team representing Serbia's first international tournament is listed as 2007, Serbia and Montenegro's tournament participation lasted from 2003 to 2006, and Yugoslavia's participation was from 1947 to 2002. Chinese Taipei was listed not to have participated in the World Cup, indeed its first participation in any FIBA tournament started in 1986; a team called "Taiwan" participated from 1960 to 1973, and a "Formosa" team joined from 1954 to 1959.

Below is the FIBA table as seen from the FIBA official website, updated with results since 1998. The records of SFR Yugoslavia and FR Yugoslavia (counted together as "Yugoslavia") are separated from records of Serbia, and Serbia and Montenegro. In the case of the Soviet Union, their records also didn't carry over to Russia.

Source: FIBA official website
Rank	Nation	Gold	Silver	Bronze	Total
1	United States	5	3	4	12
2	(Socialist Federal Republic of Yugoslavia) Yugoslavia / (Federal Republic of Yugoslavia) FR Yugoslavia	5	3	2	10
3	Soviet Union	3	3	2	8
4	Brazil	2	2	2	6
5	Spain	2	0	0	2
6	Argentina	1	2	0	3
7	Germany	1	0	1	2
8	Russia	0	2	0	2
8	Serbia	0	2	0	2
10	Greece	0	1	0	1
10	Turkey	0	1	0	1
12	Chile	0	0	2	2
12	France	0	0	2	2
14	Canada	0	0	1	1
14	Croatia	0	0	1	1
14	Lithuania	0	0	1	1
14	Philippines	0	0	1	1
Totals (17 entries)		19	19	19	57

== Participating nations ==
A total of 65 national teams have made at least one appearance in the final tournament.

== Most successful players ==
Boldface denotes active basketball players and highest medal count among all players (including these who not included in these tables) per type.

=== Multiple gold medalists ===
The table shows players who have won at least 2 gold medals at the World Cups.

Rank	Player	Country	From	To	Gold	Silver	Bronze	Total
1	Krešimir Ćosić	Yugoslavia	1967	1978	2	2	–	**4**
1	Wlamir Marques	Brazil	1954	1970	2	2	–	**4**
3	Amaury Pasos	Brazil	1954	1967	2	1	1	**4**
3	Sergei Belov	Soviet Union	1967	1978	2	1	1	**4**
5	Carmo de Souza	Brazil	1959	1970	2	1	–	3
6	Vlade Divac	Yugoslavia; FR Yugoslavia	1986	2002	2	–	1	3
6	Jatyr Schall	Brazil	1959	1967	2	–	1	3
6	Modestas Paulauskas	Soviet Union	1967	1974	2	–	1	3
6	Priit Tomson	Soviet Union	1967	1974	2	–	1	3
10	Dejan Bodiroga	FR Yugoslavia	1998	2002	2	–	–	2
10	**Stephen Curry**	United States	2010	2014	2	–	–	2
10	Predrag Drobnjak	FR Yugoslavia	1998	2002	2	–	–	2
10	Rudy Fernández	Spain	2006	2019	2	–	–	2
10	Marc Gasol	Spain	2006	2019	2	–	–	2
10	Rudy Gay	United States	2010	2014	2	–	–	2
10	Derrick Rose	United States	2010	2014	2	–	–	2
10	Dejan Tomašević	FR Yugoslavia	1998	2002	2	–	–	2
10	Waldemar Blatskauskas	Brazil	1959	1963	2	–	–	2

=== Multiple medalists ===
The table shows players who have won at least 4 medals in total at the World Cups.

Rank	Player	Country	From	To	Gold	Silver	Bronze	Total
1	Krešimir Ćosić	Yugoslavia	1967	1978	**2**	2	–	4
1	Wlamir Marques	Brazil	1954	1970	**2**	2	–	4
3	Amaury Pasos	Brazil	1954	1967	**2**	1	1	4
3	Sergei Belov	Soviet Union	1967	1978	**2**	1	1	4
5	Alexander Belostenny	Soviet Union	1978	1990	1	**3**	–	4
6	Ubiratan "Bira" Pereira Maciel	Brazil	1963	1978	1	1	**2**	4
6	Dražen Dalipagić	Yugoslavia	1974	1986	1	1	**2**	4

== Other records and statistics ==
Thirteen players – Ubiratan "Bira" Pereira Maciel, Marcel de Souza, Marcelinho Machado, Anderson Varejão, Leandro Barbosa, Alex Garcia and Marcelo Huertas of Brazil, Phil Smyth of Australia, Daniel Santiago and Jerome Mincy of Puerto Rico, Eduardo Mingas of Angola, Luis Scola of Argentina and Rudy Fernández of Spain – have appeared in five tournaments.

Brazilian legend Oscar Schmidt is the runaway all-time leading scorer, scoring 906 career points in four tournaments between 1978 and 1990. Nikos Galis of Greece is the all-time leading scorer for a single tournament, averaging 33.7 points per game for the Greeks at the 1986 FIBA World Championship.

Serbian coach and former player Željko Obradović is the only person who won the title both as a coach and a player. He was a member of the Yugoslavia team that won the 1990 FIBA World Championship and coached the Yugoslavia team that won the 1998 FIBA World Championship.

== Awards ==
FIBA names a Most Valuable Player for each tournament. Since the tournament opened to NBA players at the 1994 tournament for the first time, NBA players have won seven of the eight MVP trophies awarded – Shaquille O'Neal for the United States in 1994, Germany's Dirk Nowitzki at the 2002 tournament, Spain's Pau Gasol at the 2006 tournament, Kevin Durant for the United States at the 2010 tournament, Kyrie Irving for the United States at the 2014 tournament, Spain's Ricky Rubio at the 2019 tournament and Germany's Dennis Schröder at the 2023 tournament. The only exception was Dejan Bodiroga of FR Yugoslavia, who was the MVP of the 1998 tournament, when the NBA players were not able to participate due to the 1998–99 NBA lockout.

== Tournament growth and popularity ==
=== 2006 Tournament ===
At the 2006 championship, the accumulated TV audience figure was 800 million viewers.

=== 2010 Tournament ===
The 2010 FIBA World Championship reached a global TV audience of close to 1 billion people in nearly 200 countries. Both numbers broke the previous records set at the 2006 FIBA World Championship and at the EuroBasket 2009. Three of the games involving Lithuania were among the highest rated programs in that country. In China, 65 million watched the Chinese national team's game against Greece, in the preliminary round. This was an improvement from the 2006 FIBA World Championship, which was held in Japan, and was shown in 150 countries. This meant that games aired in the morning in Europe and at night in the Americas; despite this, audiences broke records, with Italy's game against Slovenia achieving a 20% viewing share in Italy, Serbia's game against Nigeria netting a 33% share in Serbia, and a 600,000-audience in the United States for the US national team's game against Puerto Rico at 1 am.

Before the 2010 FIBA World Championship started in Turkey, FIBA had already sold 350,000 tickets, for a revenue of between US$8 to 10 million. The number of tickets sold was 10% higher than 2006, although the revenue was less than 2006's US$18 million, which was widely attributed to the strong Japanese yen. Meanwhile, FIBA got two-thirds of marketing rights revenue, of which one-third, or about US$8 million, went to the local organizers. FIBA had also successfully negotiated TV rights deals, which all went to FIBA, worth US$25 million, including a TV rights deal with ESPN. In 2006, the Japanese organizers were targeting to sell 180,000 tickets, mostly to a Japanese audience; as for the overseas audience, the Japanese organizers didn't "expect them in great numbers". This was seen as a big improvement from the 2002 tournament, which was a financial loss for USA Basketball and Indianapolis, in which all games were held in one city. This led to the Japanese organizers to hold games throughout the country, instead of just in a single city.

=== 2014 Tournament ===
At the re-branded 2014 FIBA Basketball World Cup, in Spain, FIBA reported impressive ratings from nations which were participating in the tournament during the first week of the group phase. Most games involving European teams had a market share of at least 20%, including a 40% market share in Finland, for the Finnish national team's game against the Dominican Republic. The TV ratings in the United States beat out the 2014 US Tennis Open, but some US sports media still described viewers in the US as not caring about the FIBA Basketball World Cup. In the Philippines, the entire tournament had an average reach of 67.8%.

=== 2019 Tournament ===
According to FIBA, the TV audience for the 2019 tournament reached 3 billion, with a further 1.5 billion views on social media. A total of 160 million people around the world watched Spain defeat Argentina in the final. In Spain over 10 million tuned into the final while 6.2 million watched the full game, making it the country’s most successful basketball game ever. The tournament’s average TV audience increased by more than 80% from 2014. On-site attendance also increased, with the total attendance reaching 794,951.

=== 2023 Tournament ===
The total attendance for the 2023 tournament was 700,665, including the record-breaking FIBA Basketball World Cup crowd of 38,115 at the Philippine Arena for the game between the co-hosts and the Dominican Republic. In Germany 5.9 million viewers (4.6 million on ZDF, plus 1.3 million on MagentaSport) watched the final between Germany and Serbia.

== See also ==
- Basketball at the Summer Olympic Games
- FIBA Under-19 Basketball World Cup
- FIBA Under-17 Basketball World Cup
- FIBA Women's Basketball World Cup
- FIBA Under-19 Women's Basketball World Cup
- FIBA Under-17 Women's Basketball World Cup
