= 1965 FIBA Intercontinental Cup Test Tournament =

1965 FIBA Intercontinental Cup Test
S.C. Corinthians Paulista	Real Madrid
(Brazil)	(Spain)
118	109
- Date: July 5, 1965
- Venue: Ginásio Poliesportivo Parque São Jorge, São Paulo
- Attendance: 10,000

The 1965 FIBA Intercontinental Cup Test Tournament was the test edition of the FIBA Intercontinental Cup. The game was contested by S.C. Corinthians Paulista, and the 1965 FIBA European Champions Cup (EuroLeague) champions, Real Madrid.

The 1965 FIBA Intercontinental Cup Test was played with a single-game format, in São Paulo, Brazil, on 5 July 1965.

== Venue ==
The championship game was held at the Ginásio Poliesportivo Parque São Jorge, the home arena of S.C. Corinthians Paulista. The arena is located in São Paulo, Brazil. The arena opened in 1963, and it has a seating capacity of 7,000 people, with a standing room capacity of 10,000.

São Paulo	1965 FIBA Intercontinental Cup Test Tournament (Brazil)
Ginásio Poliesportivo Parque São Jorge	1965 FIBA Intercontinental Cup Test Tournament (Brazil)
Capacity: 7,000 seating capacity 10,000 standing room	1965 FIBA Intercontinental Cup Test Tournament (Brazil)

== Match details ==
The game was contested between S.C. Corinthians Paulista of the Brazilian Championship, and the FIBA European Champions Cup (EuroLeague) champions, Real Madrid of the Spanish Primera División. Wlamir Marques of S.C. Corinthians Paulista, was the game's top scorer, with 51 points.

5 July 1965	S.C. Corinthians Paulista (Brazil)	118–109	(Spain) Real Madrid	São Paulo, Brazil
	Pts: Wlamir 51; Bira 23; Branca 15; Renê 12; Yves 12; Edvar 5 Head coach: Daiuto		Pts: Luyk 33; Rodríguez 30; Monsalve 16; Sainz 13; Sevillano 13; González 4 Descartín 0 Head coach: Busnel	Arena: Ginásio Poliesportivo Parque São Jorge; Attendance: 10,000

1965 Intercontinental Cup Test champions

S.C. Corinthians Paulista
(unofficial)
