= Wlamir Marques =

Brazilian basketball player and coach (1937–2025)

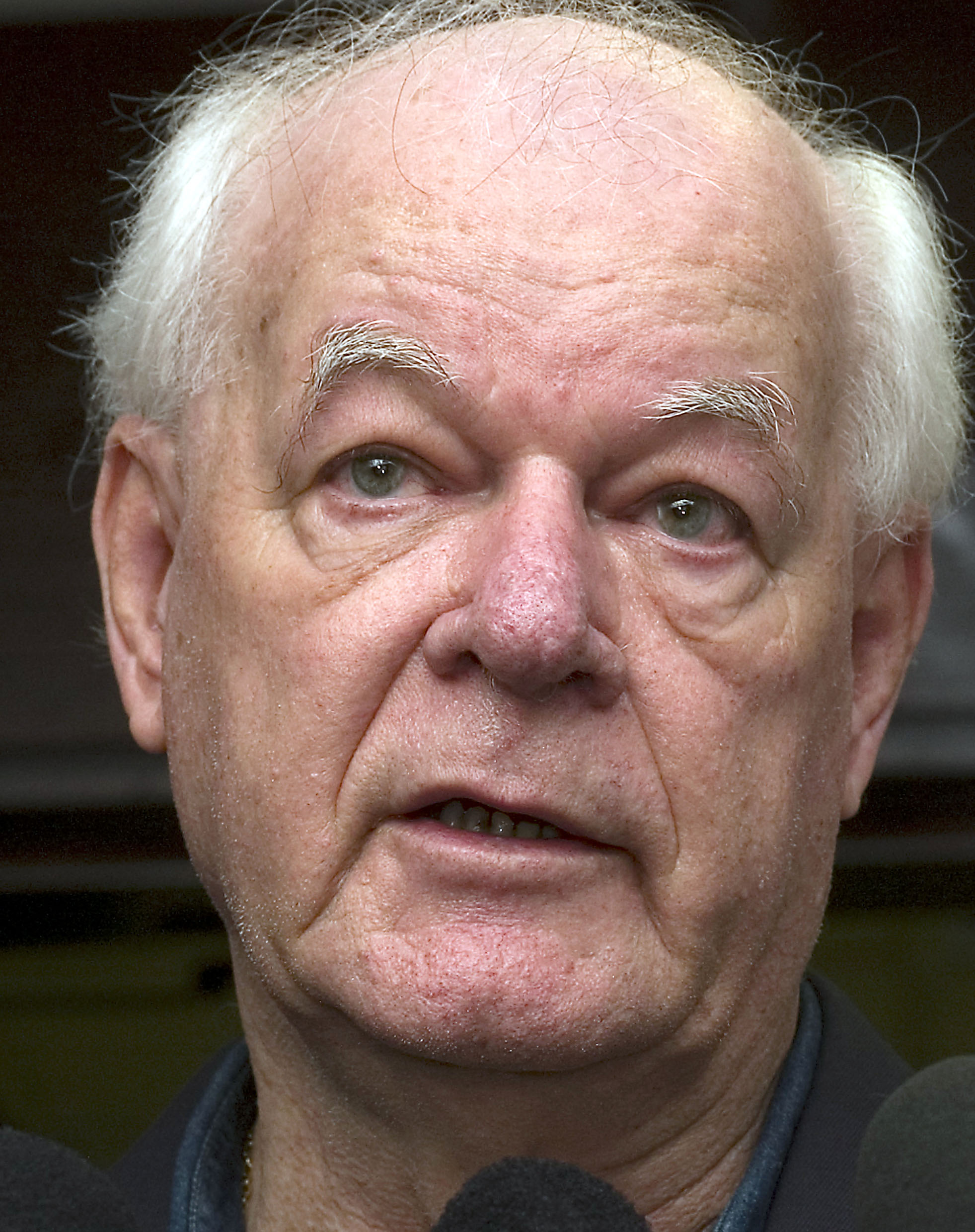

Personal information
- Born: July 16, 1937 São Vicente, Brazil
- Died: March 18, 2025 (aged 87) São Paulo, Brazil
- Listed height: 1.85 m (6 ft 1 in)
- Listed weight: 86 kg (190 lb)

Career information
- Playing career: 1953–1973
- Position: Small forward
- Number: 5
- Coaching career: 1961–1988

Career history

Playing
- 1953–1954: Clube de Regatas Piracicaba
- 1955–1961: XV de Novembro
- 1962–1972: S.C. Corinthians Paulista
- 1973: Tênis Clube de Campinas

Coaching
- 1961: Limeira
- 1963–1964: S.C. Corinthians Paulista women
- 1968: XV de Novembro women
- 1970–1971: S.C. Corinthians Paulista
- 1975: Palmeiras
- 1977: Hebraica
- 1981–1982: São Caetano women
- 1987–1988: Cerquilho

Career highlights
- As a player: FIBA's 50 Greatest Players (1991); FIBA World Cup MVP (1963); FIBA Intercontinental Test Cup champion (1965); Best Athlete of South America (1961); 2× South American Club Champion (1964, 1969); 3× Brazilian Champion (1965, 1966, 1969); 7× São Paulo State Champion (1957, 1960, 1964–1966, 1968, 1969); No. 5 retired by S.C. Corinthians Paulista (2018)
- FIBA Hall of Fame
Medals
Men's basketball
Representing Brazil
Summer Olympics
Bronze medal – third place	1960 Rome	Team
Bronze medal – third place	1964 Tokyo	Team
World Cup
Gold medal – first place	1959 Chile	Team
Gold medal – first place	1963 Brazil	Team
Silver medal – second place	1954 Brazil	Team
Silver medal – second place	1970 Yugoslavia	Team
Pan American Games
Silver medal – second place	1963 São Paulo	Team
Bronze medal – third place	1955 Mexico City	Team
Bronze medal – third place	1959 Chicago	Team
FIBA South American Championship
Gold medal – first place	1958 Chile	Team
Gold medal – first place	1960 Argentina	Team
Gold medal – first place	1961 Brazil	Team
Gold medal – first place	1963 Peru	Team
Bronze medal – third place	1955 Colombia	Team

Wlamir Marques (July 16, 1937 – March 18, 2025), also known simply as Wlamir, was a Brazilian basketball player and coach who is considered to be one of the best Brazilian basketball players of all time, and to have been one of the best players in the world during the 1960s. Alongside fellow countrymen Amaury Pasos, Algodão, and Rosa Branca, he led the best basketball generation Brazil ever had. At a height of 1.85 m (6 ft 1 in) tall, he played at the small forward position. He was nicknamed "The Flying Saucer", and "The Blonde Devil".

Along with Kresimir Cosic, Marques is one of the top two medalists in FIBA World Cup history, having won two gold medals and two silver medals. He was named one of FIBA's 50 Greatest Players in 1991. The Ginásio Poliesportivo Wlamir Marques arena is named after him, in his honor.

== Club career ==
At the club level, Marques played as a junior with São Vicente, and at the senior level with XV de Novembro, S.C. Corinthians, and Tênis Clube Campinas. He won the Brazilian League in 1965, 1966, and 1969, with S.C. Corinthians. He won the FIBA Intercontinental Cup's 1965 Test Cup championship, a game in which he scored 51 points.

== National team career ==
Marques played for the senior men's Brazilian national team, and with them he won the 1959 FIBA World Championship and the 1963 FIBA World Championship gold medals. He was the MVP of the 1963 FIBA World Championship. He also won silver medals at the 1954 FIBA World Championship and 1970 FIBA World Championship.

He won bronze medals at the 1960 Summer Olympic Games and the 1964 Summer Olympic Games, a silver medal at the 1963 Pan American Games, and bronze medals at the 1955 Pan American Games and 1959 Pan American Games.

== Post-playing career ==
After his basketball playing career ended, Marques worked as a head basketball coach. He then worked as a sports commentator for basketball games on ESPN Brasil, and has been an active personality on the show called, "Brazilian Basketball Reborn", working as an important voice on TV and internet channels.

== Death ==
Marques died at Santa Magiore Hospital in São Paulo, on 18 March 2025, at the age of 87.
