= SC Corinthians Paulista (basketball) =

S.C. Corinthians Paulista
- Leagues: New Basket Brazil
- Founded: 1910; 116 years ago (parent athletic club); 1928; 98 years ago (basketball club)
- Arena: Ginásio Wlamir Marques
- Capacity: 7,000
- Team colors: White, black
- President: Augusto Melo
- Head coach: Léo Figueiró
- Championships: 1 FIBA Intercontinental Cup (test tournament); 3 South American Club Championship; 4 Brazilian Championship; 1 Liga Ouro
- Website: corinthians.com.br
Home	Away

Sport Club Corinthians Paulista, abbreviated as either S.C. Corinthians Paulista or S.C.C.P., is a Brazilian men's professional basketball club that is based in São Paulo, Brazil. It is a part of the multi-sports club S.C. Corinthians Paulista.

== History ==
Corinthians' basketball section was founded in 1928. The club won the Brazilian Championship title 4 times, in the years 1965, 1966, 1969, and 1996. They also won the South American Club Championship three times, in the years 1965, 1966 and 1969. The club also won the 1965 FIBA Intercontinental Cup Test Tournament.

The club has also played in the current top level professional Brazilian League, the NBB, starting with the 2018–19 season.

== Roster ==
=== Current roster ===
Note: Flags indicate national team eligibility at FIBA-sanctioned events. Players may hold other non-FIBA nationalities not displayed.

Corinthians roster
Players
Coaches

Pos.	No.	Nat.	Name	Ht.	Wt.	Age
G/F	0	(United States)	Davaunta Thomas	1.84 m (6 ft 0 in)	78 kg (172 lb)	31 – 8 January 1995
PG	1	(Brazil)	Tiago Faria	1.77 m (5 ft 10 in)		22 – 5 March 2003
F	2	(Brazil)	Alisson	1.90 m (6 ft 3 in)	89 kg (196 lb)	20 – 21 April 2005
F	3	(Brazil)	Felipe Queirós	2.01 m (6 ft 7 in)	90 kg (198 lb)	27 – 31 March 1998
G/F	4	(Brazil)	Cauê Borges	1.86 m (6 ft 1 in)	86 kg (190 lb)	35 – 13 February 1991
F	6	(Brazil)	Samis Calderon	1.96 m (6 ft 5 in)	82 kg (181 lb)	21 – 25 November 2004
F	7	(Brazil)	Isaac Gonçalves	1.96 m (6 ft 5 in)	90 kg (198 lb)	35 – 2 July 1990
F	9	(Brazil)	Jonathan da Costa	1.91 m (6 ft 3 in)	82 kg (181 lb)	23 – 18 May 2002
F	10	(Brazil)	Pedro Nunes	1.91 m (6 ft 3 in)	86 kg (190 lb)	25 – 23 August 2000
C	12	(Brazil)	Lázaro Rojas	2.11 m (6 ft 11 in)	94 kg (207 lb)	29 – 18 November 1996
C	17	(Brazil)	Kauan Raymundo	2.01 m (6 ft 7 in)	98 kg (216 lb)	20 – 13 March 2005
G	21	(Brazil)	J. V. Martins	1.85 m (6 ft 1 in)	80 kg (176 lb)	21 – 23 April 2004
G	22	(Brazil)	Gabriel Landeira	1.97 m (6 ft 6 in)	85 kg (187 lb)	21 – 8 July 2004
F	32	(United States)	Zach Graham	1.95 m (6 ft 5 in)	89 kg (196 lb)	36 – 29 March 1989
C	35	(Brazil)	Maique Oliveira	2.11 m (6 ft 11 in)	108 kg (238 lb)	32 – 26 June 1993
F	45	(Brazil)	Mãozinha Pereira	1.98 m (6 ft 6 in)	88 kg (194 lb)	25 – 28 August 2000

Head coach

- (Brazil) Léo Figueiró

Legend

- (C) Team captain
- Injured

- Roster
Updated: 02 January 2023

== Arena ==
Corinthians plays its home games at the 7,000 seat Ginásio Poliesportivo Wlamir Marques, which is named after the club's former player, Wlamir Marques.

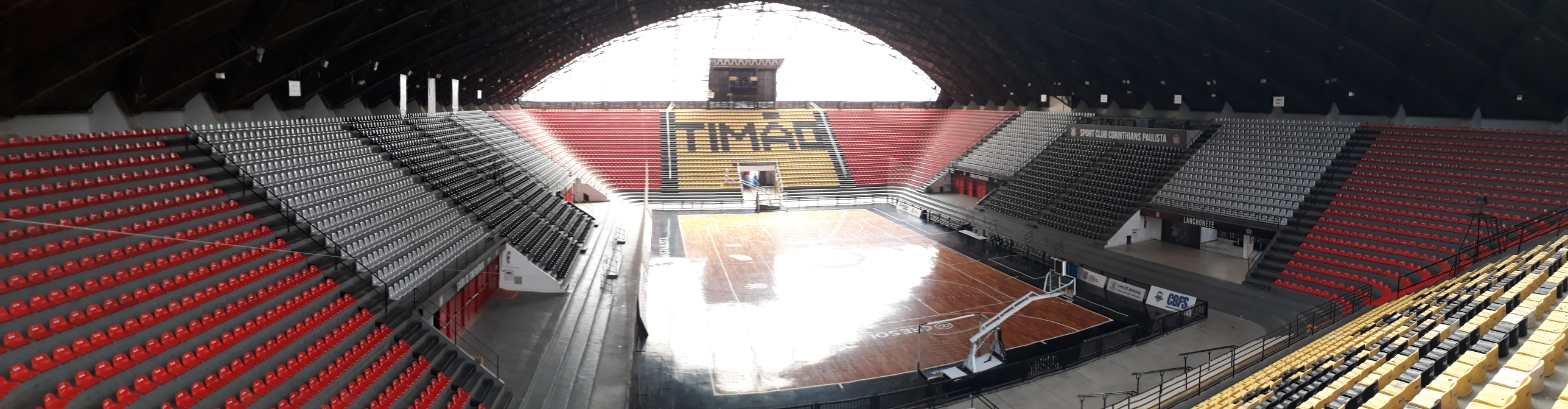
Ginásio Wlamir Marques panorama.

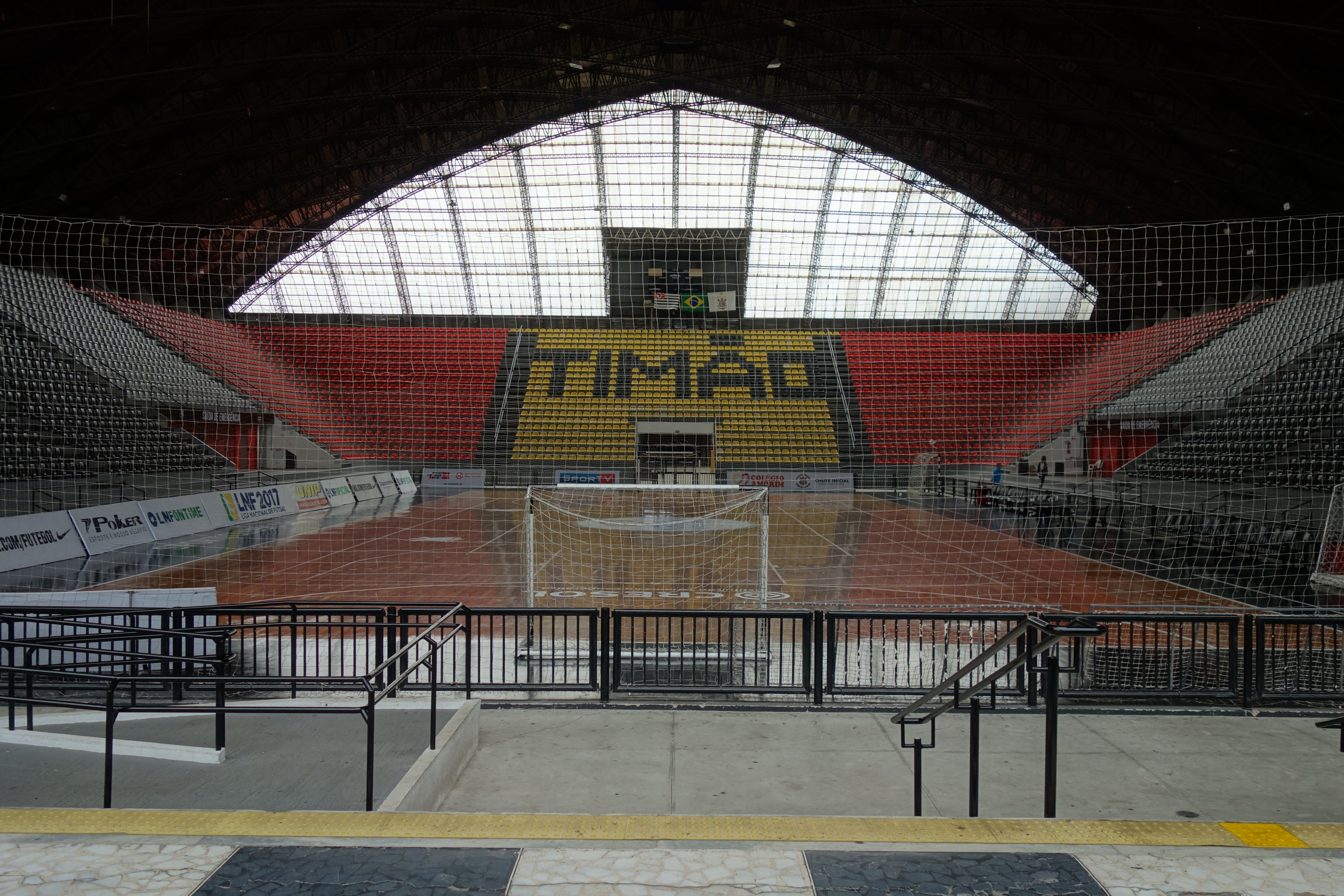
Ginásio Wlamir Marques interior view.

== Honors and titles ==
=== Worldwide ===
- FIBA Intercontinental Cup
  - Champions (1): 1965 (test edition)
  - Runners-up (1): 1966
  - Third place (1): 1970
  - Fourth place (2): 1967, 1986

=== Continental ===
- South American Club Championship
  - Champions (3): 1965, 1966, 1969
- FIBA South American League
  - Runners-up (3): 1996, 1997, 2019

=== National ===
- Brazilian Championship
  - Champions (4): 1965, 1966, 1969, 1996
  - Runners-up (5): 1967, 1968, 1970, 1983, 1986 (I)
- Brazilian second division
  - Champions (1): 2018

=== Regional ===
- São Paulo State Championship
  - Champions (14): 1935, 1939, 1947, 1951, 1952, 1954, 1955, 1964, 1965, 1966, 1968, 1969, 1983, 1985
  - Runners-up (5): 1967, 1982, 1984, 2003, 2019, 2023

== Retired numbers ==
S.C. Corinthians Paulista retired numbers
N°	Nat.	Player	Position	Tenure	Date Retired
5	(Brazil)	Wlamir Marques	SF	1962–1972	2018

== Notable players ==
Note: Flags indicate national team eligibility at FIBA-sanctioned events. Players may hold other non-FIBA nationalities not displayed.

Criteria

To appear in this section a player must have either:

- Set a club record or won an individual award while at the club
- Played at least one official international match for their national team at any time
- Played at least one official NBA match at any time.

- (Brazil) Eduardo Agra
- (Brazil) Israel Andrade
- (Brazil) José Aparecido
- (Brazil) Emil Assad Rached
- (Brazil) Edson Bispo
- (Brazil) Fúlvio de Assis
- (Brazil) Josuel dos Santos
- (Brazil) Rosa Branca
- (Brazil) Wagner da Silva
- (Brazil) Zé Geraldo
- (Brazil) Guilherme Giovannoni
- (Brazil) Marquinhos Leite
- (Brazil) Bira Maciel
- (Brazil) Wlamir Marques
- (Brazil) Fernando Minucci
- (Brazil) Victor Mirshauswka
- (Brazil) Adilson Nascimento
- (Brazil) Amaury Pasos
- (Brazil) Hélio Rubens
- (Brazil) Oscar Schmidt
- (Brazil) Humberto Silva
- (Brazil) Edvar Simões
- (Brazil) Marcel Souza
- (Brazil) Gerson Victalino
- (Brazil) Marcelo Vido
- (Brazil) Marquinhos Vieira
- (Brazil) Paulinho Villas Boas
- (Puerto Rico) Mario Butler
- (Puerto Rico) James Carter
- (Uruguay) Luciano Parodi
- (United States) Kyle Fuller
- (United States) Rocky Smith

== Notable coaches ==
- (Brazil) Moacyr Daiuto
- (Brazil) Wlamir Marques
- (Brazil) Cláudio Mortari
- (Puerto Rico) Flor Meléndez

== See also ==
- SC Corinthians Paulista
- SC Corinthians Paulista (women)
- SC Corinthians Paulista (futsal)
- SC Corinthians Paulista (beach soccer)
- Corinthians Steamrollers (american football)
- SC Corinthians Paulista (Superleague Formula team)
