= Ginásio Poliesportivo Wlamir Marques =

Indoor arena in Tatuapé, São Paulo, Brazil

Ginásio Wlamir Marques
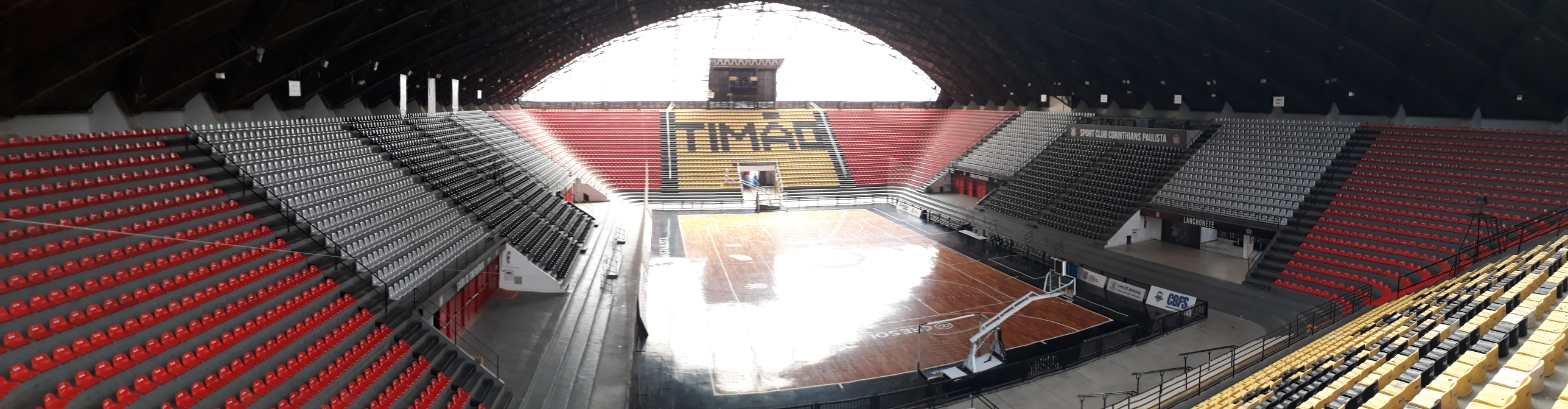
- The interior of Ginásio Wlamir Marques.
- Interactive map of Ginásio Wlamir Marques
- Full name: Ginásio Poliesportivo Wlamir Marques
- Former names: Ginásio Poliesportivo Parque São Jorge
- Location: Tatuapé, São Paulo, Brazil
- Coordinates: 23.52559°S 46.56625°W
- Capacity: Futsal: 7,000

Construction
- Opened: May 1963

Tenant
- S.C. Corinthians Paulista

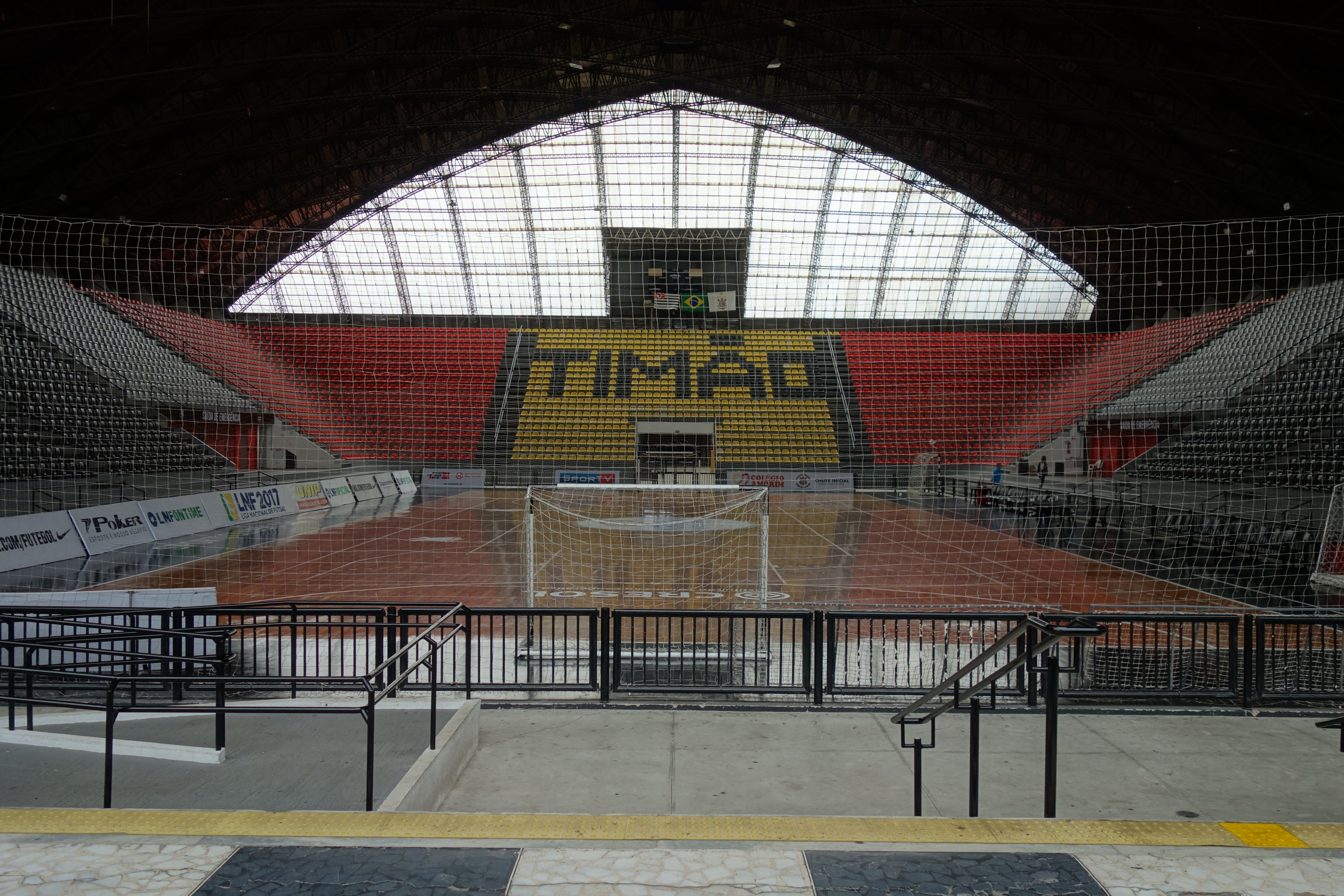
Ginásio Wlamir Marques in futsal configuration.

The Ginásio Poliesportivo Wlamir Marques (English: Wlamir Marques Multi-sport Gymnasium), previously known as the Ginásio Poliesportivo Parque São Jorge (São Jorge Park Multi-sport Gymnasium), is a multipurpose indoor arena that is located in the Tatuapé district of São Paulo, Brazil. It is a part of the Parque São Jorge multi-sports complex. The arena is primarily used to host futsal games, for which it has a seating capacity of 7,000 people.

== History ==
The arena opened in May 1963. It hosted the original Test Tournament of the FIBA Intercontinental Cup, in July 1965, in which the local club, S.C. Corinthians Paulista, beat the Spanish Primera División club Real Madrid, by a score of 118–109. Over the years, the arena has been used as the home arena of the professional basketball team S.C. Corinthians Paulista, of the Brazilian League (NBB).

The arena was named after the well-known Brazilian basketball player, Wlamir Marques, in October 2016.

== Major sporting events held at the arena ==
Event	Date
1965 FIBA Intercontinental Cup Test	7/5/1965
2019 FIBA World Cup qualifiers	11/30/2018, 12/3/2018

Preceded by None	FIBA Intercontinental Cup; Final Venue; 1965	Succeeded by Pabellón de la Ciudad Deportiva; Madrid
