= 2010 FIBA World Championship qualification =

Qualifying for the 2010 FIBA World Championship in Turkey commenced as early as 2007 and will culminate in the five continental championships in each of the five FIBA zones. The final ranking of each continental championship determines which teams go to Turkey for the world championship, with FIBA allocating slots partly based on a zone's strength.

In addition to the host, the gold medalists in the 2008 Olympic basketball championship are also allocated automatic berths to the championship. Teams that failed to crack the top positions in their respective continental championships may still be selected as wild cards to fill out the 24-team cast.

A total of 106 countries participated in qualification to the world championship. This is less than in the 2010 FIFA World Cup (204) and 2010 FIVB Men's World Championship (109), but more than the 2011 Rugby World Cup (98) and the 2011 Cricket World Cup (about 100).

== Qualified teams ==
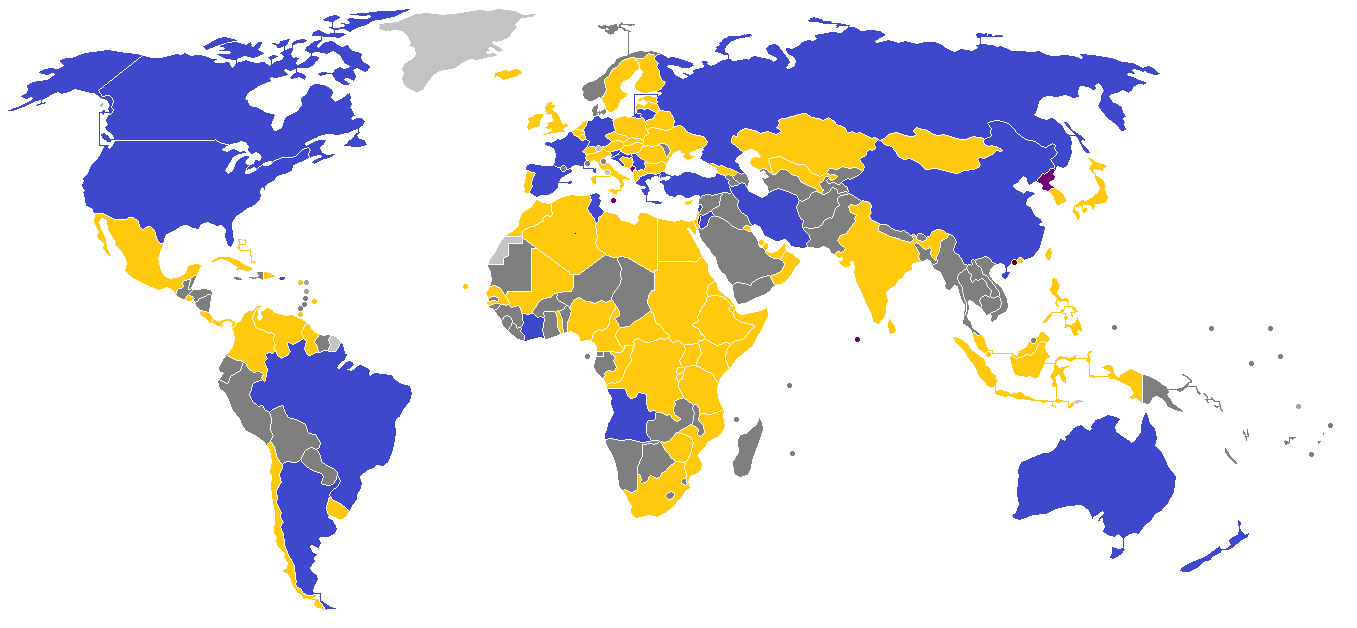
Qualifying for the 2010 World Championship.

Turkey is automatic qualifier as the host country. The USA also received an automatic berth for winning the 2008 Olympic men's basketball tournament.

Eighteen other teams qualified through continental qualifying tournaments, and FIBA invited four more "wild card" teams to fill out the 24-team field. Each FIBA zone is allocated a certain amount of automatic berths based upon the strength of its zone: the weakest zone, Oceania, gets only two automatic berths each, while Europe gets six.

Certain peculiarities include:

- On the Oceanian championship, only two teams registered to compete, and with Oceania having two automatic berths, both were automatically qualified.
- Turkey, despite being qualified already, still played at the European championships. Had Turkey finished sixth or higher, the seventh-placed team would also have qualified.
- The USA did not send a team to the Americas championship because they had automatically qualified by winning the gold medal in the men's Olympic basketball tournament.

Qualifying tournaments:

Qualifying tournament	Duration	Location	Berths	Teams qualified
Host	–	Turkey	1	Turkey
2008 Olympic men's basketball tournament	August 10–24, 2008	China	1	United States
FIBA Africa Championship 2009	August 4–14, 2009	Libya	3	Angola; Ivory Coast; Tunisia
FIBA Asia Championship 2009	August 6–16, 2009	China	3	Iran; China; Jordan
FIBA Oceania Championship 2009	August 23–25, 2009	Australia; New Zealand	2	New Zealand; Australia
FIBA Americas Championship 2009	August 26-September 6, 2009	Puerto Rico	4	Brazil; Puerto Rico; Argentina; Canada
EuroBasket 2009	September 7–20, 2009	Poland	6	Spain; Serbia; Greece; Slovenia; France; Croatia
Wild cards	December 12–13, 2009	Turkey	4	Russia; Lebanon; Lithuania; Germany

The draw for the championship took place in Istanbul on December 15, 2009.

== Summary ==
Qualified for the Championship outright
Qualified automatically
Selected as a wild card
Qualified via continental qualifying tournament

These are the final standings of the different World Championship qualifying tournaments. The venues are as follows, with the city of the knockout stage mentioned first:

- Men's Olympic basketball tournament: Beijing (China)
- FIBA Africa Championship 2009: Benghazi, Tripoli (Libya)
- FIBA Americas Championship 2009: San Juan (Puerto Rico)
- FIBA Asia Championship 2009: Tianjin (China)
- EuroBasket 2009: Gdańsk, Poznań, Warsaw, Wrocław, Bydgoszcz, Łódź, Katowice (Poland)
- FIBA Oceania Championship 2009: Sydney (Australia) and Wellington (New Zealand)
- Wild cards: Istanbul (Turkey)

Rank	Olympics	Africa	Americas	Asia	Europe	Oceania	Wildcard
1st	United States	Angola	Brazil	Iran	Spain	New Zealand	Germany; Lebanon; Lithuania; Russia
2nd	Spain	Ivory Coast	Puerto Rico	China	Serbia	Australia	Germany; Lebanon; Lithuania; Russia
3rd	Argentina	Tunisia	Argentina	Jordan	Greece		Germany; Lebanon; Lithuania; Russia
4th	Lithuania	Cameroon	Canada	Lebanon	Slovenia		Germany; Lebanon; Lithuania; Russia
5th	Greece	Nigeria	Dominican R.	Chinese Taipei	France		
6th	Croatia	C.A.R.	Uruguay	Qatar	Croatia		
7th	Australia	Senegal	Mexico	South Korea	Russia		
8th	China	Mali	Panama	Philippines	Turkey		
9th	Russia	Rwanda	Venezuela	Kazakhstan	North Macedonia; Poland		
10th	Germany	Egypt	Virgin Islands	Japan	North Macedonia; Poland		
11th	Iran	Libya		Kuwait	Germany; Lithuania		
12th	Angola	Morocco		UAE	Germany; Lithuania		
13th		Cape Verde		India	Latvia; Israel; Great Britain; Bulgaria		
14th		Mozambique		Uzbekistan	Latvia; Israel; Great Britain; Bulgaria		
15th		South Africa		Indonesia	Latvia; Israel; Great Britain; Bulgaria		
16th		Congo		Sri Lanka	Latvia; Israel; Great Britain; Bulgaria		
