= Raven Barber =

American basketball player (born 1991)

No. 35 – Toros Laguna
- Position: Power forward / center
- League: CIBACOPA

Personal information
- Born: October 2, 1991 (age 35) Edgewood, Maryland, U.S.
- Listed height: 6 ft 9 in (2.06 m)
- Listed weight: 235 lb (107 kg)

Career information
- High school: Paul VI (Fairfax, Virginia)
- College: Mount St. Mary's (2009–2013)
- NBA draft: 2013: undrafted
- Playing career: 2013–present

Career history
- 2013–2014: Halifax Rainmen
- 2014: Södertälje Kings
- 2014–2015: Ústí nad Labem
- 2015: Once Caldas
- 2016–2018: Benfica
- 2018–2019: Palma
- 2019–2020: Obras Sanitarias
- 2021: Cáceres Ciudad del Baloncesto
- 2021: Hapoel Midgal Haemek
- 2022: U.D. Oliveirense
- 2022-2024: Boca Juniors
- 2024-2025: União Corinthians
- 2026–present: Toros Laguna

Career highlights
- LPB champion (2017); LPB MVP 2017; MVP Taça Hugo dos Santos 2018; NBL Canada Rookie of the Year (2014); NBL Canada All-Rookie Team (2014)

Raven Barber (born 2 October 1991) is an American professional basketball player for União Corinthians of the Novo Basquete Brasil. He has experience playing with multiple teams in Europe, and was named Rookie of the Year in his initial season with the Halifax Rainmen in the National Basketball League of Canada (NBL). Barber played four years of college basketball with Mount St. Mary's after graduating from Paul VI Catholic High School in Fairfax, Virginia.

On March 1, 2022, Barber signed with U.D. Oliveirense.
