= 2006 FIBA World Championship final =

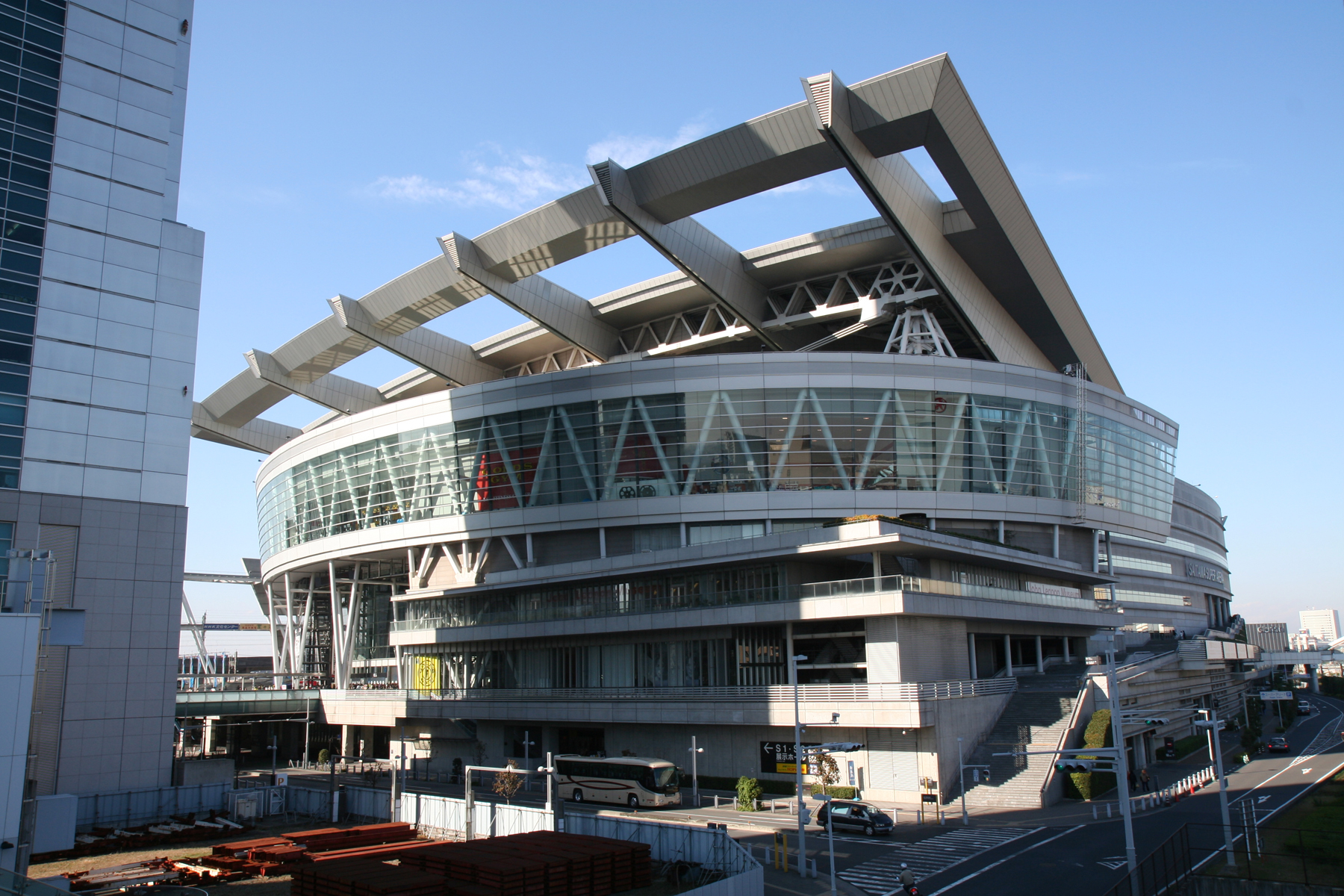
- The Saitama Super Arena in Saitama hosted the final
- Event: 2006 FIBA World Championship
Greece	Spain
(Greece)	(Spain)
47	70
	1	2	3	4	Total
Greece	12	11	11	13	47
Spain	18	25	11	16	70
- Date: 3 September 2006
- Venue: Saitama Super Arena, Saitama
- Attendance: 18,500

The 2006 FIBA World Championship final was a basketball game between the men's national teams of Greece and the Spain that took place on September 3, 2006, at the Saitama Super Arena in Saitama, Japan.

It was the first finals appearance for Spain, whose best achievement in the World Cup was the fourth place in 1982. Greece also made its first Final appearance, after finishing fourth in the last two tournaments.

Spain won the final 70–47, and won its first World Cup title. Also, Spain qualified for the 2008 Summer Olympics.

== Route to the final ==
Spain		Round	Greece	
Opponent	Result	Season	Opponent	Result
1st in Group B (5–0)		Regular season	1st in Group C (5–0)	
Serbia and Montenegro	87–75	Round of 16	China	95–64
Lithuania	89–67	Quarter-finals	France	73–56
Argentina	75–74	Semi-finals	United States	101–95

== Match details ==
Spain play the final without their star player, later to be named tournament MVP, Pau Gasol, who suffered partial fracture of his fifth metatarsal in his left foot in the Semi-final against Argentina. Greece just came off a stunning victory against the United States in their semi-final.

3 September 2006	Greece	47–70	Spain	Saitama
19:30	Scoring by quarter: 12–18, 11–25, 11–11, 13–16
	Pts: Kakiouzis 17; Rebs: Kakiouzis 9 Asts: Papaloukas, Diamantidis 3	Boxscore	Pts: Garbajosa, Navarro 20; Rebs: Jiménez 11; Asts: Garbajosa, Rodríguez 4	Arena: Saitama Super Arena; Attendance: 18,500; Referees: Carl Jungebrand (FIN), Terry Moore (USA), Pablo Alberto Estévez (ARG)

Greece	Spain

Starters:			Pts	Reb	Ast
PG	13	Dimitris Diamantidis	4	4	3
SG	7	Vassilis Spanoulis	4	2	2
SF	15	Michalis Kakiouzis	17	9	1
PF	9	Antonis Fotsis	7	3	0
C	14	Lazaros Papadopoulos	2	0	0
Reserves:					
G	4	Theodoros Papaloukas	10	5	3
C	5	Sofoklis Schortsanitis	2	0	0
G	6	Nikos Zisis	DNP		
SG	10	Nikos Chatzivrettas	0	3	0
F	8	Panagiotis Vasilopoulos	0	2	0
F	11	Dimos Dikoudis	1	2	4
F	12	Kostas Tsartsaris	0	2	1
Head coach:
(Hellenic Basketball Federation) Panagiotis Giannakis

Game rules
Game was played under FIBA rules.

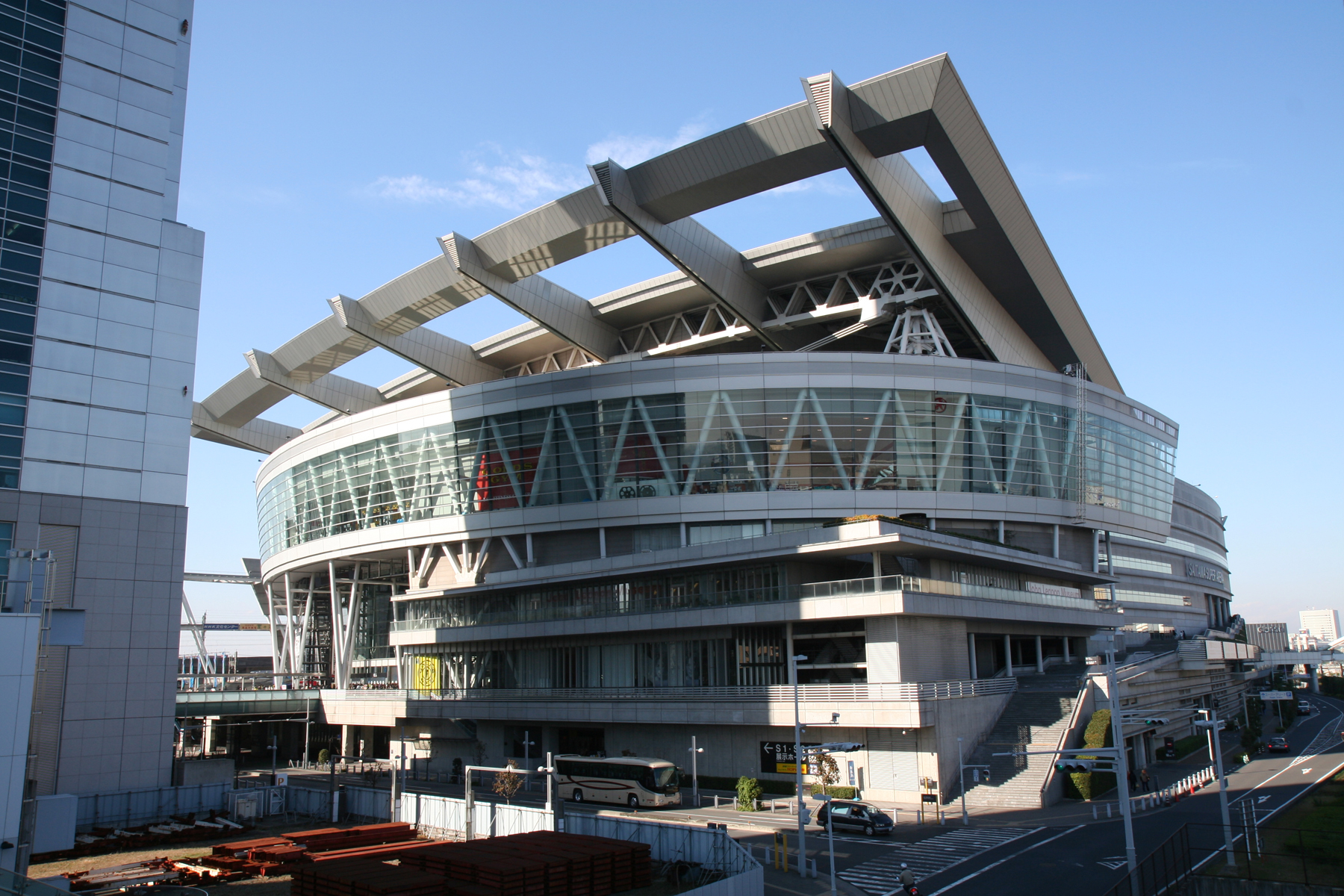
Saitama Super Arena

2006 World Champions

Spain
1st title

Starters:			Pts	Reb	Ast
PG	8	José Calderón	7	1	1
SG	7	Juan Carlos Navarro	20	4	3
SF	10	Carlos Jiménez	4	11	0
PF	9	Felipe Reyes	10	3	0
C	15	Jorge Garbajosa	20	10	4
Reserves:					
PG	5	Rudy Fernández	0	0	0
G	6	Carlos Cabezas	1	1	1
G	11	Sergio Rodríguez	0	1	3
G	12	Berni Rodríguez	6	4	3
C	13	Marc Gasol	2	7	0
F	14	Álex Mumbrú	0	1	0
C	4	Pau Gasol (injured)	DNP		
Head coach:
(Spanish Basketball Federation) Pepu Hernández

Greece	Statistics	Spain
18/55 (32.7%)	2-pt field goals	26/61 (42.6%)
5/21 (23.8%)	3-pt field goals	12/30 (40%)
6/12 (50%)	Free throws	6/11 (54.5%)
10	Offensive rebounds	14
22	Defensive rebounds	26
32	Total rebounds	40
9	Assists	16
18	Turnovers	17
4	Steals	9
4	Blocks	2
19	Fouls	12
