= 2012 NBA Europe Live Tour =

- Sport: Basketball
- Duration: 5–9 October 2012
- Teams: 6

NBA Europe Live Tour seasons
- ← 2010

The 2012 NBA Europe Live Tour was a basketball exhibition tour featuring teams from the NBA and the Euroleague, as a part of the NBA Europe Live Tour. The hosting countries were Turkey, Germany, Italy and Spain.

== Teams ==
The NBA teams that participated were:

- (United States) Boston Celtics (2nd participation)
- (United States) Dallas Mavericks

The Euroleague teams that participated were:

- (Turkey) Fenerbahçe Ülker
- (Germany) Alba Berlin
- (Italy) Olimpia Milano (2nd participation)
- (Spain) FC Barcelona Regal (3d participation)

== Games ==
5 October 2012

Boxscore

Boston Celtics (United States)	91–97	(Turkey) Fenerbahçe Ülker

Ülker Sports Arena, Istanbul

6 October 2012

Boxscore

Dallas Mavericks (United States)	89–84	(Germany) Alba Berlin

O2 World, Berlin

7 October 2012

Boxscore

Boston Celtics (United States)	105–75	(Italy) Olimpia Milano

Mediolanum Forum, Milan

9 October 2012

Boxscore

Dallas Mavericks (United States)	85–99	(Spain) FC Barcelona Regal

Palau Sant Jordi, Barcelona

== Stats ==
Club	Games	Record
(Spain) Barcelona	1	1–0
(Turkey) Fenerbahçe Ülker	1	1–0
(United States) Dallas Mavericks	2	1–1
(United States) Boston Celtics	2	1-1
(Germany) Alba Berlin	2	1-1
(United States) Olimpia Milano	1	0-1

Topscorer:

- (United States) Jeff Green (33 pts - 2 games)

== See also ==
- 2012 EuroLeague American Tour
- List of NBA versus international games
