= NBA Europe Live Tour (2006-2012) =

Series of basketball games

The NBA Europe Live Tour (also known as NBA Europe Live) was a series of annual basketball exhibition tours that featured teams from the NBA and teams from Europe's top professional leagues on European soil. It was launched by the National Basketball Association and the Euroleague Basketball and it would take place during the NBA's pre-season in September of October and lasted from 2006 until 2012.

Most of the European teams were playing in the ULEB-inititated EuroLeague and Europe's 2nd-tier level EuroCup. The games of the NBA Europe Live Tour Tour were played by the NBA rules. Many legendary players like Kevin Garnett, Carmelo Anthony, Paul Pierce, Allen Iverson, Tony Parker, Tim Duncan, Manu Ginobili have featured in the series from 2006 until 2012.

== History ==
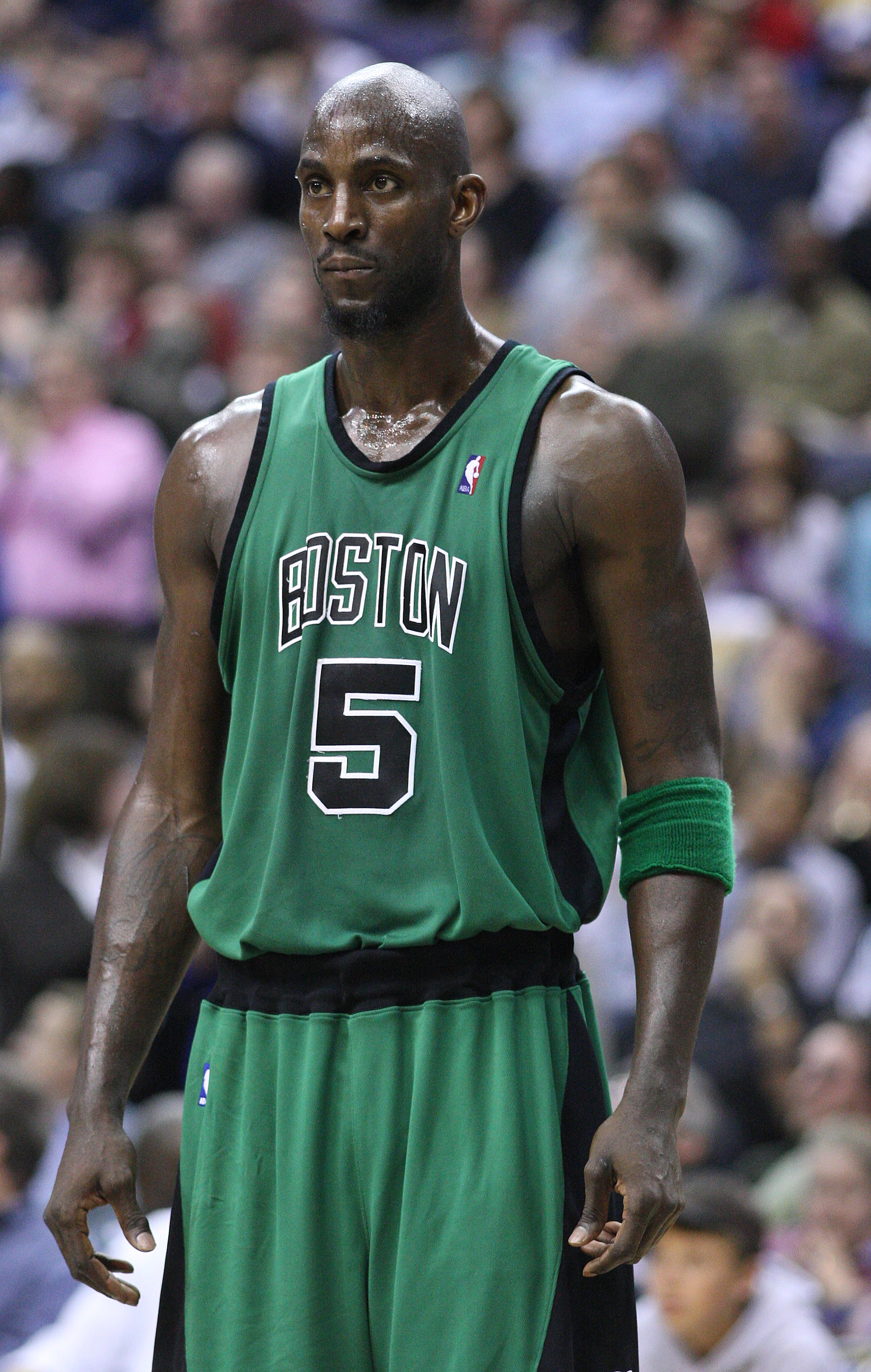
Kevin Garnett participated with the Boston Celtics in the 2007 edition.

On June 14, 2005, NBA and Euroleague Basketball announced the launch of the NBA Europe Tour as part of a 2-year partnership agreement with Electronic Arts. The series' website (as www.nba.com/europelive) went live in December 2005.

In October 2006, four NBA teams travelled to different European countries to conduct their first week of training camp overseas: the Philadelphia 76ers in Barcelona, Spain; the Los Angeles Clippers in Moscow, Russia; the San Antonio Spurs in France; and the Phoenix Suns in Treviso, Italy. The 76ers and the Suns also participated in the Cologne tournament which was on by the Philadelphia 76ers. It was the first time since the last McDonald's Championship in 1999 that NBA teams faced top European clubs in a tournament. The final game of the Tour in Barcelona attracted 16,236 fans which was the edition's record (Philadelphia 76ers against Barcelona).

The 2008 edition featured only four NBA teams playing against each other in European cities. In 2009 the EuroLeague American Tour started alongside the NBA Europe Live with Euroleague teams touring the USA to face NBA teams.

There was no tour in 2011 due to the NBA lock-out and the series resumed in 2012 for its final edition.

== Editions ==
Year	Host countries	Team with best record	Record
2006	Germany, Russia, France, Italy, and Spain	(United States) San Antonio Spurs (Russia) PBC CSKA Moscow	2-0
2007	England, Italy, Spain and Turkey	(United States) Boston Celtics	2-0
2008	England, France, Germany and Spain	(United States) New Jersey Nets (United States) New Orleans Hornets	2-0
2009	England, and Spain	(United States) Indiana Pacers (United States) Phoenix Suns (United States) Philadelphia 76ers	2-0
2010	England, France, and Spain	(United States) Minnesota Timberwolves	2-0
2012	Germany, Turkey, Italy, and Spain	(United States) Boston Celtics	2-0

- Philadelphia 76ers won the Cologne tournament in the 2006 edition beating PBC CSKA Moscow in the final.

== Topscorers ==
Year	Player	Points	Games	Team
2006	(United States) Allen Iverson	57	3	Philadelphia 76ers
2007	(Italy) Andrea Bargnani	49	3	Toronto Raptors
2008	(United States) Dwyane Wade	39	2	Miami Heat
2009	(United States) Carmelo Anthony	62	2	Denver Nuggets
2010	(United States) (Israel) Amar'e Stoudemire	43	2	New York Knicks
2012	(United States) Jeff Green	33	2	Boston Celtics

== Teams with most participations ==
Club	Participations	Editions
(Spain) FC Barcelona Regal	3	2006, 2011, 2012
(United States) San Antonio Spurs	2	2009, 2012
(United States) Phoenix Suns	2	2006, 2009
(United States) Memphis Grizzlies	2	2010, 2012
(United States) Philadelphia 76ers	2	2006, 2009
(United States) Boston Celtics	2	2007, 2012
(United States) Los Angeles Clippers	2	2006, 2009
(United States) Minnesota Timberwolves	2	2007, 2010
(United States) New York Knicks	2	2009, 2010
(Italy) Olimpia Milano	2	2010, 2012
(Israel) Maccabi Tel Aviv	2	2006, 2009
(Italy) Lottomatica Roma	2	2006, 2007
(Spain) Real Madrid	2	2007. 2009

== See also ==
- EuroLeague American Tour
- List of NBA versus international games
- McDonald's Championship
- NBA Global Games
- NBA versus EuroLeague games

== Sources ==
- 2006 Live tour
- Attendances
