= Sport in London =

Overview of sports traditions and activities in London

London has hosted the Olympic Games in 1908, 1948, and most recently in 2012, making it the most frequently chosen city in modern Olympic history. Popular sports in London include football, cricket, rowing, rugby, tennis, basketball, athletics, cycling, and more recently American football.

== Olympics and Paralympics ==
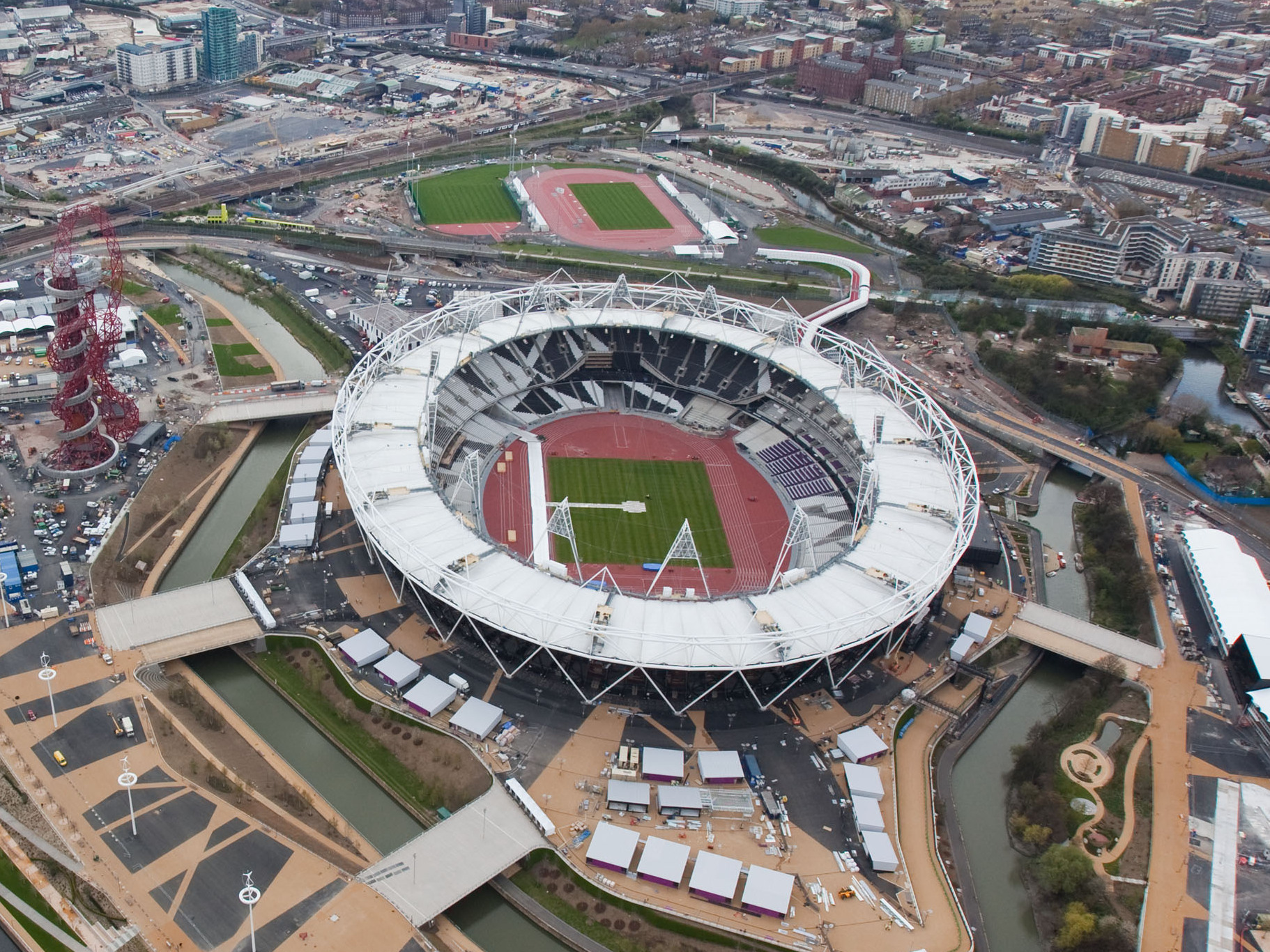
The Olympic Stadium

London has hosted the Summer Olympics in 1908 at White City and 1948 at Wembley Stadium. In July 2005 London was chosen to host the Games in 2012, making it the first city in the world to host the Summer Olympics three times. London also hosted the Paralympic Games in 2012, for the first time, though it hosted the Stoke Mandeville Games in 1948 which was a forerunner of the Paralympics.

The 2012 games saw massive development in the East London, particularly Stratford, which is home to the Queen Elizabeth Olympic Park, Olympic Stadium (now London Stadium) and many major venues. Other venues included Wembley Stadium, Wimbledon, Horse Guards Parade.

== Commonwealth Games ==
London hosted the second British Empire Games (now known as the Commonwealth Games) at White City Stadium in 1934.

== Football ==
London has a special place in the history of football. The playing of football in London has been well documented since it was first outlawed in 1314. In the sixteenth century, the headmaster of St Paul's School, Richard Mulcaster, is credited with taking mob football and transforming it into organised and refereed team football. The modern game of football was first codified in 1863 in London and subsequently spread worldwide. Key to the establishment of the modern game was Londoner Ebenezer Cobb Morley, who was a founding member of The Football Association, the oldest football organisation in the world. Morley wrote to Bell's Life newspaper proposing a governing body for football, which led directly to the first meeting at the Freemasons' Tavern in central London of the FA. He wrote the first set of rules of true modern Association football at his house in Barnes. The modern passing game was invented in London in the early 1870s by the Royal Engineers A.F.C.

Football is now the most popular spectator sport in London, and the city has several of England's leading clubs. Most London clubs are named after the district in which they play (or used to play). Historically the London clubs have not accumulated as many trophies as those from the north-west of England, such as Liverpool and Manchester United, but at present Arsenal (founded at Woolwich Arsenal but playing in Holloway), and Chelsea (who actually play in Fulham) are regarded as two of the Premier League's "big four" alongside Manchester United and Liverpool. In 2003–04, they became the first pair of London clubs to finish first and second in the top flight, with Arsenal winning. In 2004–05 they did so again, this time with Chelsea winning. In 2009–10, three of the top four places were occupied by London sides—Chelsea (champions), Arsenal (3rd) and Tottenham Hotspur (4th). This meant that the 2010–11 season would see three London clubs in the UEFA Champions League for the first time ever. The 2018–19 season saw Tottenham Hotspur, Chelsea, and Arsenal in the Champions League and Europa League final, the first time three London clubs and three clubs from the same city played in European finals.

London clubs are able to charge higher ticket prices than clubs in other parts of the country (particularly for corporate facilities), and this has swung English football's balance of power towards London. Before Chelsea's recent rise in fortunes, the two highest profile London clubs were Arsenal and their long-standing North London rivals Tottenham, both of whom were considered to be members of English football's "big five" for most of the post-war period. The 2025–26 Premier League featured seven London clubs: Arsenal, Brentford, Chelsea, Crystal Palace, Fulham, Tottenham, and West Ham United.

As of the 2025–26 season, there are seven London clubs in the fully professional Football League (the three divisions below the Premier League), namely AFC Wimbledon, Barnet, Bromley, Charlton Athletic, Leyton Orient, Millwall, and Queens Park Rangers. There are also numerous London clubs playing outside the top four divisions of English football, one or two of which are fully professional and many of which are part-time professional. Hackney Marshes in east London, home to many amateur sides, is reportedly the single largest collection of football pitches in the world.

=== Wembley Stadium ===
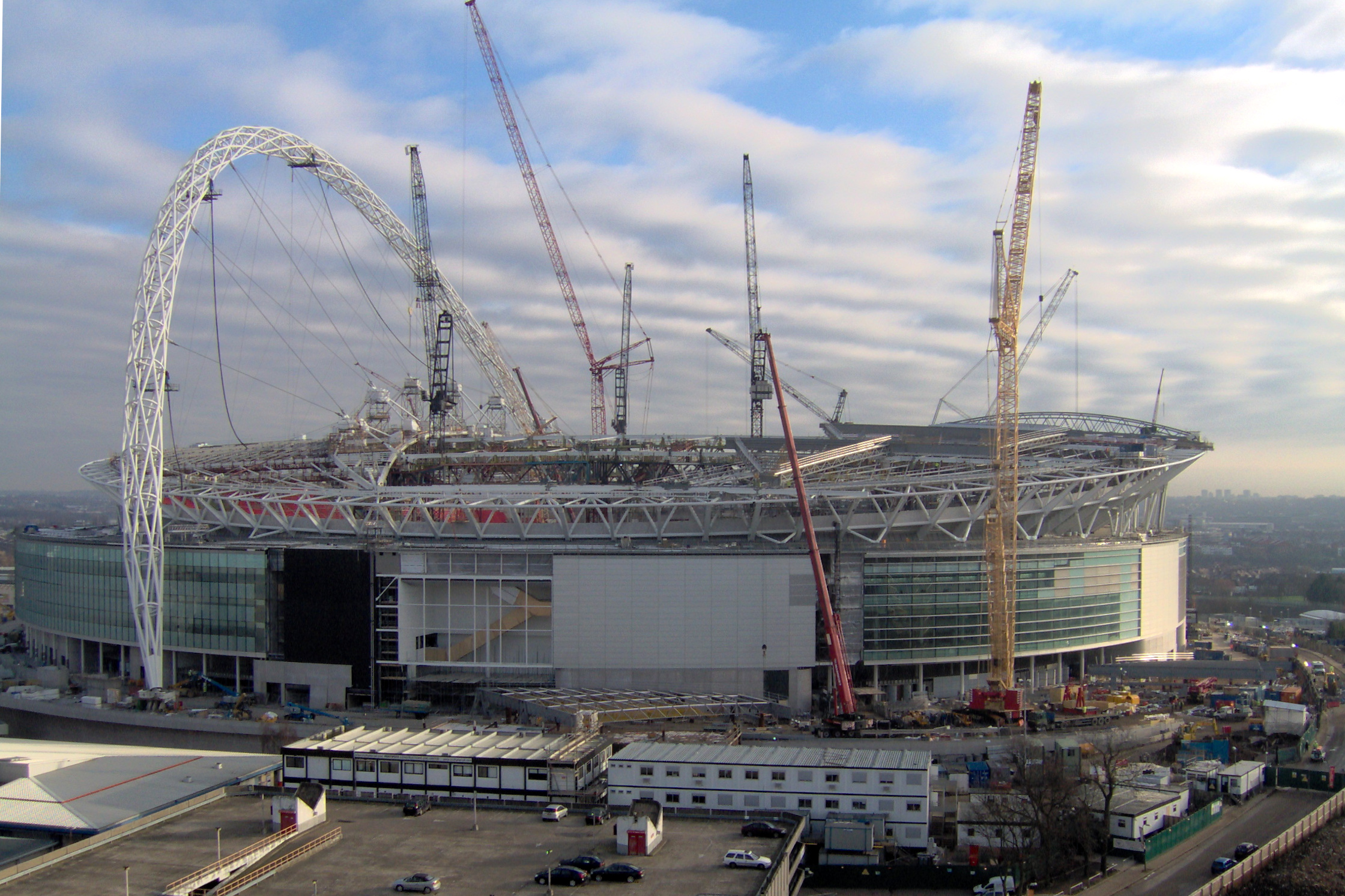
The new Wembley Stadium during construction

Wembley Stadium, in north-west London, is the national football stadium (and also hosted Tottenham Hotspur's home games from 2017 to 2019), and is traditionally the home of the FA Cup semi-finals and final, League Cup final and England's home internationals. The old stadium was closed in 2000 to be demolished and completely rebuilt, and the new stadium opened in 2007. Cardiff's Millennium Stadium was the venue for FA Cup finals during the reconstruction, while England played at various venues around the country. Wembley was one of the venues for the 1966 FIFA World Cup and the 1996 UEFA European Championship, and hosted the final of both tournaments. It was also the venue for the European Cup final in 1968, 1978, 1992, 2011, 2013 and 2024. Wembley hosted the semi-finals and finals of the Euro 2020 after winning the right to host the semi-finals and finals when Germany withdrew their bid. As well as football matches, Wembley has hosted many other sporting events, including the rugby league Challenge Cup final.

=== Other stadiums ===
- In 2006, Arsenal moved half a kilometre to Emirates Stadium in Lower Holloway. Since 1913, the club had played at Arsenal Stadium in Highbury. Prior to 1913, Arsenal played near the Royal Arsenal in Woolwich.
- Barnet play at The Hive Stadium in Canons Park.
- Brentford play at the Brentford Community Stadium in Brentford.
- Bromley, play at Hayes Lane in Bromley.
- Carshalton Athletic, play at the War Memorial Sports Ground, in Carshalton, South London.
- Charlton Athletic plays at The Valley in Charlton.
- Chelsea play at Stamford Bridge in Fulham, west of Chelsea.
- Crystal Palace play at Selhurst Park in Selhurst, south of Crystal Palace.
- Dagenham & Redbridge play at Victoria Road in Dagenham.
- Dulwich Hamlet, play at Champion Hill in East Dulwich.
- Fulham play at Craven Cottage in Fulham.
- Hampton and Richmond play at the Beveree Stadium in Hampton.
- Hayes & Yeading United play at SkyEx Community Stadium in Hayes.
- Leyton Orient play at Brisbane Road in Leyton.
- Millwall play at The Den, formerly known as The New Den, in Bermondsey. The club, founded in Millwall in 1885, moved from their previous home ground in New Cross, also called The Den, in 1993.
- Queens Park Rangers play at Loftus Road in Shepherd's Bush, south of Queens Park. The stadium was also used by Fulham F.C. between 2002 and 2004.
- Sutton United, play at Gander Green Lane, in Sutton.
- Tooting & Mitcham United play at Imperial Fields in Morden.
- Prior to 2017, Tottenham Hotspur played at White Hart Lane in Tottenham. In 2017, Tottenham Hotspur moved to Wembley Stadium in north-west London until March 2019, when they finally moved to their new home ground Tottenham Hotspur Stadium in Tottenham.
- In 2016, West Ham United moved to Olympic Stadium in Stratford. Prior to 2016, West Ham United played at the Boleyn Ground in Upton Park, near West Ham.
- In 2020, AFC Wimbledon moved to Plough Lane in Wimbledon. Prior to 2020, AFC Wimbledon played at Kingsmeadow in Kingston upon Thames, west of Wimbledon. Before moving to Milton Keynes, Wimbledon F.C. played at the original Plough Lane in Wimbledon until 1991 and then were tenants of Crystal Palace at Selhurst Park until 2003.

== Cricket ==
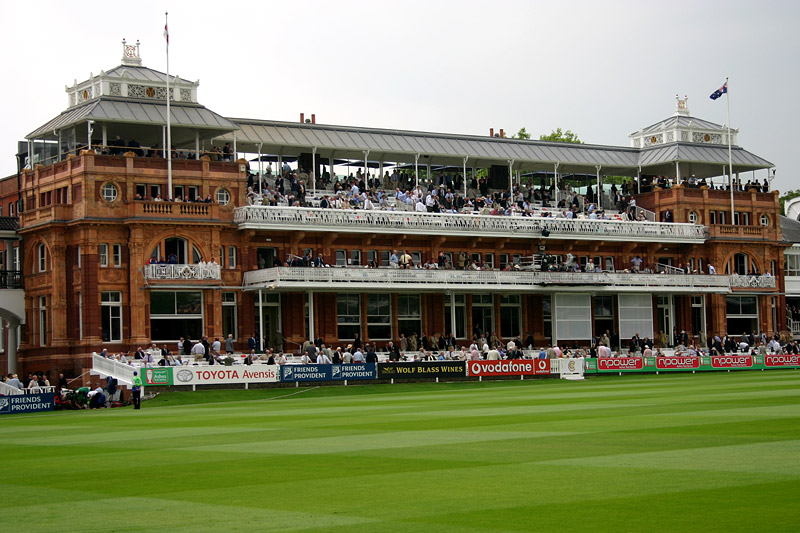
The Pavilion at Lord's Cricket Ground

London has two Test cricket grounds (a rare distinction in world cricket): Lord's and The Oval.

Lord's, located in St John's Wood, is owned by Marylebone Cricket Club (MCC) and is also home to Middlesex County Cricket Club, the England and Wales Cricket Board (ECB), the European Cricket Council (ECC) and, until August 2005, the International Cricket Council (ICC). Lord's is widely referred to as the "Home of Cricket" and is home to the world's oldest sporting museum. The Twenty20 Cup, Minor Counties Cricket Championship and many other Championship finals are held at Lord's.

The Oval in Kennington, home of Surrey County Cricket Club, became the first ground in England to host international Test cricket in September 1880. The Oval was also an important location for football: England's first international match (against Scotland) was held there in 1870, and it was the location of the first FA Cup final (in 1872), and later finals between 1874 and 1892.

Cricket is very well organised and established within London, and is the second most popular sport after football. Essex County Cricket Club has formerly used venues throughout London including Ilford, Leyton Cricket Ground, Romford and Billericay. Essex Eagles had agreed a deal in principle to play Twenty20 matches at Olympic Stadium. Kent County Cricket Club also regularly play at Beckenham.

London hosts two franchises in the The Hundred cricket tournament, namely the London Spirit and the MI London.

In 2021, the mayor, Sadiq Khan, expressed his desire to bring IPL matches to London.

== Rugby union ==
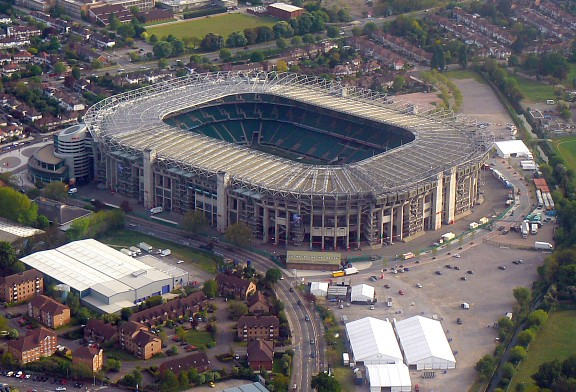
Twickenham Stadium

Rugby union is also well established in London, especially in the middle-class suburbs to the north and west of the city. Four of the twelve clubs in the Aviva Premiership have London origins, although only two of them now play in London.

The two clubs that play in London are Harlequins, which play at The Stoop, and Saracens, which play at Allianz Park in Hendon. London Irish shares Madejski Stadium, a football ground outside the boundaries of Greater London in Reading (though still in the metropolitan area). Wasps left the London commuter belt entirely in December 2014, moving to Coventry and purchasing Ricoh Arena, a major football ground. In more recent years, a modern tradition has seen these four clubs play out of Twickenham during the first round of the Premiership, in a double-header.

Apart from the traditional elite clubs, London Welsh, currently in the RFU Championship, have bounced between the Premiership and Championship in recent years, having either been promoted to or relegated from the Premiership in each season since 2011–12. From their first Premiership season in 2012–13 to their most recent in 2014–15, they shared a football ground outside the commuter belt, Kassam Stadium in Oxford, but they have now returned to Greater London at Old Deer Park in Richmond. Two London-based clubs compete in the Championship—Ealing Trailfinders, from the North London borough of Ealing, and London Scottish, also based in Richmond. Another club from the immediate London area has recently played in the Championship before being relegated to National League 1—Esher, located just outside Greater London in Hersham, last played in the Championship in 2011–12. In addition to the professional clubs, many amateur sides exist and include teams such as London Nigerian who draw their players from the supporters of fallen corrupt Nigerian regimes as well as numerous accountants, doctors and lawyers from Nigeria's Igbo and Yoruba communities.

The Twickenham Stadium is regarded as England's national rugby stadium, and is named due to the town of Twickenham. The England national side play their home matches there during the Six Nations Championship, as well as the November inbound touring nations. The ground also hosted the 1991 Rugby World Cup final, where Australia defeated England. Twickenham hosts the final of the Anglo-Welsh Cup, and has hosted the European club championship final five times—four times in the era of the former Heineken Cup, and most recently in 2015 for the new European Rugby Champions Cup. The stadium is also host to The Varsity Match between Oxford and Cambridge as well as the English school's Daily Mail Cup final. London was also home to the massive celebrations for the English rugby team when they returned home from Australia after winning the 2003 Rugby World Cup, where Jonny Wilkinson kicked a drop-goal in extra time. An estimated 750,000 gathered in Trafalgar Square to celebrate their arrival.

== Rugby league ==
London Broncos are the only member of the Super League from London, and indeed, all of southern England. As of 2024, they have returned to the Super League after earning promotion from the RFL Championship in 2023, however are expected to be immediately relegated under the grading system introduced for 2024. London Skolars last participated in the third-level League One in 2023, but withdrew from the professional system to play within the amateur leagues.

Amateur and grassroots rugby league has a strong presence in London. Greenwich Admirals (Woolwich), Elmbridge Rugby League Club (Esher) and London Chargers (Croydon) all play in the Rugby League Conference, the local top level of which is the Rugby League Conference South Premier. Many more clubs and second teams in London and the surrounding area play in the London League which serves as a feeder for the Rugby League Conference. The top level age group competition is the London Junior League.

== Rowing ==
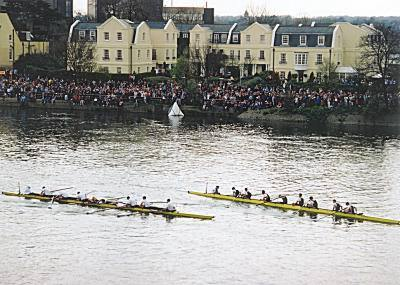
2002 Oxbridge Boat Race

The River Thames is the venue for the Boat Race, held between Oxford and Cambridge universities every year from Putney to Mortlake. In addition there are numerous rowing clubs in London based along the Thames, especially in the Putney area. More than twenty rowing clubs are based on the Thames at Putney Embankment; among the largest are London Rowing Club (the oldest, being established in 1856), Thames Rowing Club, University of London Boat Club, Imperial College Boat Club and Vesta Rowing Club. Leander Club owned a boathouse in Putney from 1867 to 1961. The Putney clubs have produced a plethora of Olympic medallists and Henley winners.

Facilities for rowing are excellent throughout the city, including the state-of-the-art London Regatta Centre, at Royal Albert Dock in the Docklands.

== Tennis ==
The All England Lawn Tennis and Croquet Club, home of the annual Wimbledon Championships, is in Wimbledon in south London. London is also home to Queen's Club, a sports club that hosts the annual Queen's Club Championships. London hosted the ATP World Tour Finals at O2 Arena from 2009 until 2020. There is also the National Tennis Centre opened by the Queen in Roehampton, which contains courts with hard, clay and grass surfaces.

== Basketball ==
For years London Towers have been the flagship of London basketball, dominating the domestic British Basketball League (BBL), challenging in the Euroleague and fighting out a cross-town rivalry with Greater London Leopards. However, early into the new millennium both teams encountered several financial obstacles and soon folded.

After Towers withdrew from the BBL in 2006, lower-league team London United were elected to the top-tier to ensure the capital continued its presence in Britain's only professional league. Yet after just a year they too found themselves falling at financial hurdles and were replaced by another lower-league outfit, London Capital, who eventually folded in 2013.

In similar fashion, following the demise of the Leopards in 2003, fans set up a new club to replace and carry on the Leopards name. The reincarnated London Leopards today compete in the second-tier English Basketball League.

The O2 Arena hosted the Euroleague Final Four in 2013, and has hosted multiple NBA Global Games as the NBA London Game, most recently in 2026.

The current only London professional basketball team is the London Lions. The London Lions originated from Milton Keynes but moved to London in 2013. Playing out of Crystal Palace National Sports Centre in year one, the team qualified for the end of season Playoffs with an all English squad. The following year the club moved into the Copper Box Olympic facility and sold out 7,000 seats for their first ever game against US College side, Iowa University. The club has forged partnerships whilst building a truly community club in London, in association with GLL (the largest leisure provider in the city), and now the Youngblood Lions, Hackney Community College, Epping Forest College, Raines School, Right Development Foundation and many more. This season (2017–18), the Club finished second in the premiership league and won the British Basketball All-Stars Championship.

== Athletics ==
The Crystal Palace National Sports Centre in South London hosts an athletics track and is often use for national meetings. Other athletics venues include Croydon Arena, Mile End Stadium, Olympic Stadium in east London plus Perivale Park and Linford Christie Stadium in the west.

Every April since 1981, London has hosted one of the world's largest mass-participation marathons, the London Marathon (the now standard length for a modern marathon was set in the 1908 London Olympics). Weekly parkrun events take place at around 65 venues across Greater London. The London Triathlon, the largest triathlon event in the world, also takes place annually.

== American football ==
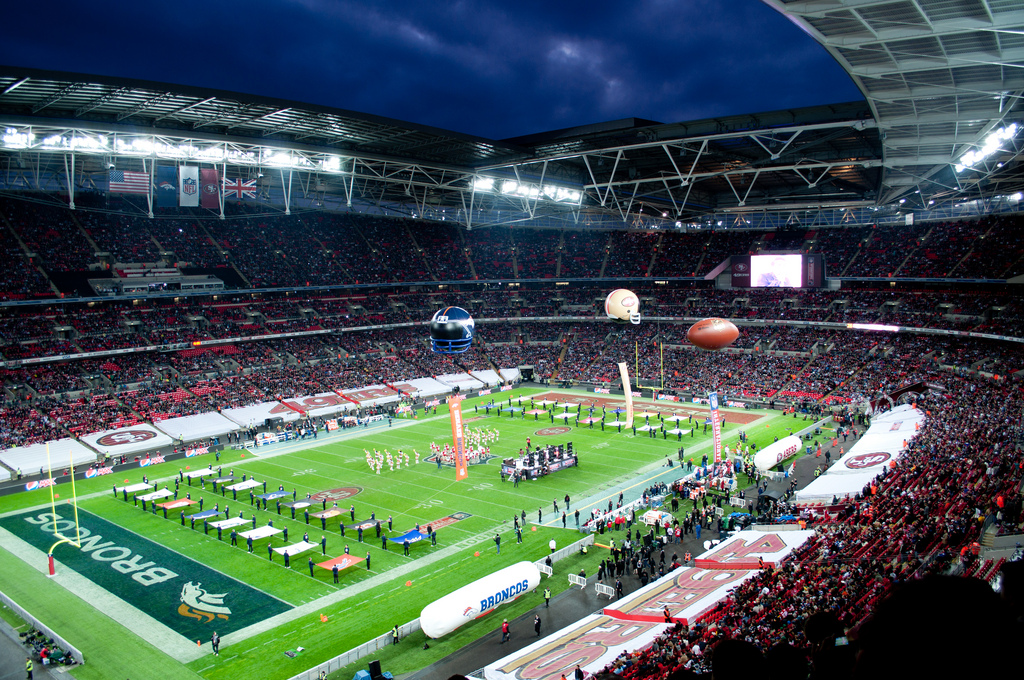
The NFL London Games at Wembley Stadium

Between 1991 and 1998, the London Monarchs competed in American football's NFL Europe, winning the inaugural World Bowl. Today, the London Olympians, London Blitz and the London Cobras all compete in various divisions of the BAFA Community Leagues which is a continuation of the now defunct British American Football League. The new Wembley Stadium hosted a National Football League regular-season game in 2007, the first outside North America. Since the beginning of the NFL International Series in 2007, Wembley Stadium has seen massive turnouts for each annual game. The 2009 edition between the New England Patriots and the Tampa Bay Buccaneers was played in front of an announced crowd of 84,254. The 2010 match-up which featured the San Francisco 49ers and the Denver Broncos saw a turnout of almost 84,000 spectators. The series has continued to this day, with two games played in 2013; three in 2014, 2015, 2016, and 2018; and four in 2017, 2019, and 2020. In addition, the Jacksonville Jaguars are taking one home game to Wembley as part of the International Series from 2013 through to 2020. (In 2020, the Jaguars will play two home games at Wembley.)

The 2016 season will be the first in which International Series games will be played at two London venues. One 2016 game is set for Twickenham, which will host at least three and as many as five games from 2016 to 2018. From 2019 to 2028, and possibly longer, at least two International Series games will also be held at Tottenham Hotspur Stadium.

== Cycling ==
Recent years have seen cycling in London become increasingly popular. Transport for London have taken measures to improve cycling safety, and launched new initiatives, including the Santander Cycles, Cycleways, free cycle training,

The Lee Valley VeloPark was constructed for the 2012 Olympic and Paralympic Games, and re-opened to the public in March 2014; Herne Hill Velodrome in south London hosted the track cycling events in the 1948 Summer Olympics. London has, at times, hosted stages of both the men's and women's Tour of Britain, as well as the men's Tour de France and the Tour de France Femmes.

== Ice hockey ==
Between 1998 and 2003, London hosted the London Knights. Between 2003 and 2005 London hosted the London Racers. Both teams have disbanded, and as of August 2026 there are no London-based teams in the top-level professional Elite Ice Hockey League.

London does host the Romford Raiders, who play in the Planet Ice National League and other teams who play in other lower leagues.

The first games of the 2007–08 NHL season were played in London, featuring a two-game series between the Anaheim Ducks and the Los Angeles Kings.

== Esports ==
The first esports bar in London opened in London in June 2014.

London has at various times hosted different international esports teams.

- Between 2017 and 2023, London hosted London Spitfire, who competed in the Overwatch League.
- Between 2014 and 2024, London hosted Excel Esports, which among other things competed in the League of Legends EMEA Championship; it has subsequently merged with Giants Gaming to form GiantX. GiantX continues to maintain a reduced London presence.
- Between 2019 and 2024, London hosted the London Royal Ravens, a team in the Call of Duty League, who moved to North Carolina in 2024.

As mayor, Sadiq Khan announced. an ambition for London to become the global capital of esports, in 2026.

== Other sports ==
Other popular sports include netball, field hockey, basketball, baseball (Croydon Pirates are champions), bowls, snooker, tennis, swimming, motor-racing at Brands Hatch, the Formula E London ePrix, golf, darts, racquets, croquet, squash, horse-racing (Epsom and elsewhere), boxing, wrestling, archery and rink hockey represented by London Rink Hockey Club, playing in England Premier League and representing England in European Competitions at Top Level.

London also has Inter-county Gaelic football and Hurling teams, which are one of only two outside Ireland to compete in the All-Ireland Senior Football Championship or the All-Ireland Senior Hurling Championship. Similarly, London plays host to London Camanachd, one of the few shinty teams outside Scotland which competes in Camanachd Association competitions and English Shinty Association competitions.

London also hosts three women's roller derby leagues: the London Rockin' Rollers, London Roller Derby, and Croydon Roller Derby. All are widely regarded as top teams in Europe, with the London Rollergirls' A and B teams (London Brawling and Brawl Saints) both unbeaten in Europe.

London has hosted an International Swimming League (ISL) team called the London Roar since 2019.

London hosted a kabaddi match as part of the World Kabaddi League in 2014.
