= 2009 NBA Europe Live Tour =

- Sport: Basketball
- Duration: 3–20 October 2009
- Teams: 14

NBA Europe Live Tour seasons
- ← 2008 2010 →

The 2009 NBA Europe Live Tour was a basketball exhibition tour featuring teams from the NBA and Real Madrid from the Euroleague, as a part of the NBA Europe Live. The hosting countries were England and Spain.

The 2009 tour was combined with the Euroleague American Tour to create an eleven-game global preseason schedule.

== Teams ==
The NBA teams that participated were:

- (United States) Utah Jazz
- (United States) Chicago Bulls
- (United States) Denver Nuggets
- (United States) Phoenix Suns (2nd participation)
- (United States) San Antonio Spurs (2nd participation)
- (United States) New York Knicks
- (United States) L.A. Clippers (2nd participation)
- (United States) Indiana Pacers
- (United States) Cleveland Cavaliers
- (United States) Philadelphia 76ers (2nd participation)

The Euroleague teams that participated were:

- (Serbia) Partizan Belgrade
- (Spain) Real Madrid (2nd participation)
- (Greece) Olympiacos
- (Israel) Maccabi Tel Aviv (2nd participation)

== Games ==
3 October 2009

Boxscore

| Partizan Belgrade (Serbia) | 70–102 | (United States) Denver Nuggets |

Pepsi Center, Denver (United States)

6 October 2009

Boxscore

| Partizan Belgrade (Serbia) | 80–111 | (United States) Phoenix Suns |

US Airways Center, Phoenix (United States)

6 October 2009

Boxscore

| Utah Jazz (United States) | 101–102 | (United States) Chicago Bulls |

The O2 Arena, London (United Kingdom)

8 October 2009

Boxscore

| Utah Jazz (United States) | 109–87 | (Spain) Real Madrid |

Palacio de Deportes, Madrid (Spain)

8 October 2009

Boxscore

| Denver Nuggets (United States) | 104–126 | (United States) Indiana Pacers |

Taipei Arena, Taipei (Taiwan)

9 October 2009

Boxscore

| Olympiacos (Greece) | 89–107 | (United States) San Antonio Spurs |

AT&T Center, San Antonio (United States)

11 October 2009

Boxscore

| Indiana Pacers (United States) | 128–121 | (United States) Denver Nuggets |

Wukesong Indoor Stadium, Beijing (China)

12 October 2009

Boxscore

| Olympiacos (Greece) | 94–111 | (United States) Cleveland Cavaliers |

Quicken Loans Arena, Cleveland (United States)

18 October 2009

Boxscore

| Maccabi Tel Aviv (Israel) | 91–106 | (United States) New York Knicks |

Madison Square Garden, New York (United States)

18 October 2009

Boxscore

| Philadelphia 76ers (United States) | 116–94 | (United States) Phoenix Suns |

Monterrey Arena, Monterrey (Mexico)

20 October 2009

Boxscore

| Maccabi Tel Aviv (Israel) | 96–108 | (United States) L.A. Clippers |

Staples Center, Los Angeles (United States)

== Stats ==
| Club | Games | Record |
|---|---|---|
| (United States) Indiana Pacers | 2 | 2–0 |
| (United States) Phoenix Suns | 2 | 2–0 |
| (United States) Philadelphia 76ers | 2 | 2–0 |
| (United States) New York Knicks | 1 | 1–0 |
| (United States) Chicago Bulls | 1 | 1–0 |
| (United States) Los Angeles Clippers | 1 | 1–0 |
| (United States) San Antonio Spurs | 1 | 1–0 |
| (United States) Cleveland Cavaliers | 1 | 1–0 |
| (United States) Utah Jazz | 2 | 1–1 |
| (United States) Denver Nuggets | 2 | 1–1 |
| (Spain) Real Madrid | 1 | 0-1 |
| (Greece) Olympiacos | 2 | 0-2 |
| (Serbia) Partizan Belgrade | 2 | 0-2 |
| (Israel) Maccabi Tel Aviv | 2 | 0-2 |

Topscorer:

- (United States) Carmelo Anthony (62 pts)

== See also ==
- 2009 EuroLeague American Tour
