= London Game =

London Game may refer to:

- NBA London Game, in basketball
- The London Game, a board game
