= 2012 EuroLeague American Tour =

2009 EuroLeague American Tour
- Sport: Basketball
- Duration: 5-9 October 2012
- Number of teams: 6

EuroLeague American Tour seasons

The 2012 Euroleague American Tour was a basketball exhibition tour featuring teams from the Euroleague and the NBA, as a part of the Euroleague American Tour. The hosting countries were the United States and Canada.

== Participants ==
Continent	Teams	Clubs			
Europe	2	(Spain) Real Madrid	(Italy) Mens Sana Siena		
North America	4	(United States) Cleveland Cavaliers	(Canada) Toronto Raptors	(United States) Memphis Grizzlies	(United States) San Antonio Spurs

== Games ==
6 October 2012

Boxscore

Real Madrid (Spain)	93–105	(United States) Memphis Grizzlies

FedExForum, Memphis, Tennessee

6 October 2012

Boxscore

Mens Sana Basket (Italy)	77–106	(United States) San Antonio Spurs

AT&T Center, San Antonio, TX

8 October 2012

Boxscore

Real Madrid (Spain)	95–102	(Canada) Toronto Raptors

Air Canada Centre, Toronto, ON

8 October 2012

Boxscore

Mens Sana Siena (Italy)	85–91	(United States) Cleveland Cavaliers

Quicken Loans Arena, Cleveland, OH

== Stats ==
Club	Games	Record
(United States) Memphis Grizzlies	1	1–0
(United States) San Antonio Spurs	1	1–0
(United States) Cleveland Cavaliers	1	1-0
(Canada) Toronto Raptors	1	1-0
(Spain) Real Madrid	2	0-2
(Italy) Mens Sana Siena	2	0-2

Topscorer:

- (United States) Bobby Brown (42 pts - 2 games)

== See also ==
- 2009 Euroleague American Tour
- 2010 Euroleague American Tour
- List of games played between NBA and international teams
