= NBA London Game =

Basketball game played annually from 2011 until 2019 in London

- First played: 2011
- Last played: January 18, 2026
- Site: The O2 Arena in London

The NBA London Game is a National Basketball Association (NBA) game held in London, that was played annually from 2011 until 2019 (except in 2012). It is played at The O2 Arena in London.

== History ==
The first NBA game played in London, was an October 30, 1993 preseason game between the Orlando Magic and the Atlanta Hawks. The teams played again the following day. The next game in London was not until 2007, as part of the Europe Live Tour. Three more Europe Live Tour games were played in London, one each year in 2008, 2009, and 2010. The first NBA London Game was, which was the first regular season game played in Europe, was played on March 4, 2011, between the Toronto Raptors and New Jersey Nets. The teams played again the following day.

== Games ==
No.	Date	Away team	Home team	Score	Attendance	Ref.
1	March 4, 2011	Toronto Raptors	New Jersey Nets	103–116	18,689	
2	March 5, 2011	Toronto Raptors	New Jersey Nets	136–137 (3 OT)	18,689	
3	January 17, 2013	New York Knicks	Detroit Pistons	102–87	18,689	
4	January 16, 2014	Brooklyn Nets	Atlanta Hawks	127–110	18,689	
5	January 15, 2015	New York Knicks	Milwaukee Bucks	79–95	18,689	
6	January 14, 2016	Toronto Raptors	Orlando Magic	106–103 (OT)	18,689	
7	January 12, 2017	Indiana Pacers	Denver Nuggets	112–140	18,689	
8	January 11, 2018	Boston Celtics	Philadelphia 76ers	114–103	19,078	
9	January 17, 2019	New York Knicks	Washington Wizards	100–101	19,078	
10	January 18, 2026	Orlando Magic	Memphis Grizzlies	109–126	18,424	

== Standings ==
Team	Games	W–L	Pct	Most recent
New Jersey/Brooklyn Nets	3	3–0	1.000	4
Milwaukee Bucks	1	1–0	1.000	5
Denver Nuggets	1	1–0–0	1.000	7
Boston Celtics	1	1–0	1.000	8
Washington Wizards	1	1–0	1.000	9
Toronto Raptors	3	1–2	.333	6
New York Knicks	3	1–2	.333	9
Detroit Pistons	1	0–1	.000	3
Atlanta Hawks	1	0–1	.000	4
Orlando Magic	1	0–1	.000	6
Indiana Pacers	1	0–1	.000	7
Philadelphia 76ers	1	0–1	.000	8
Team	Games	W–L	Pct	Most recent

== Hiatus and Return ==
Beginning with the 2019–20 season, the NBA London Game was replaced by the NBA Paris Game, though the league stated that the goal was broadening their reach in Europe before returning to London. The NBA returned to the United Kingdom with a London game in 2026 and the first ever Manchester Game in 2027.
