= London Triathlon =

Triathlon competition in London, England

Coordinates: 51°30.3′N 0°2′E

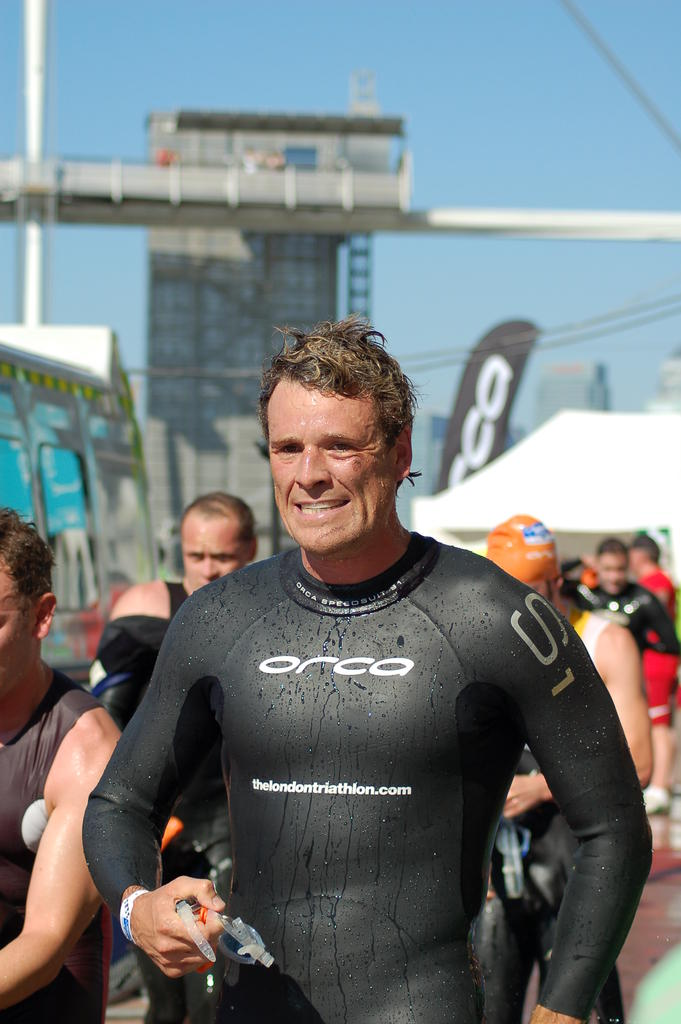
James Cracknell at the London Triathlon 2007

The modern London Triathlon was launched in 1997, with Michael Smithwick of sports marketing company Esprit as event manager. Smithwick sought to model the event on the successful formula of the London Marathon, combining mass participation with elite competition and charitable fundraising. The inaugural event was held in London's Docklands on 21 September 1997 and was limited to 3,000 competitors, with a further 2,000 applicants reportedly turned away; at the time it was the largest Olympic-distance triathlon in Europe. Simon Lessing won the men's race. Contemporary and later accounts associated the event's launch with Smithwick and Esprit.

The London Triathlon (currently known as the "AJ Bell London Triathlon", and previously the Virgin Active London Triathlon, Mazda London Triathlon and the Michelob ULTRA London Triathlon, for sponsorship reasons) is an annual triathlon event in London, England. Until 2015 it was the largest triathlon in the world. Since the relocation of the International Triathlon Union London event to Leeds, it is the only triathlon held in central London.

Participants can choose between four individual distances or two team relay distances:

Class	Swim	Bike	Run
Super Sprint	400 m	10 km	2.5 km
Sprint	750 m	20 km	5 km
Olympic	1500 m	40 km	10 km
Olympic Plus	1500 m	80 km	10 km

The course passes some of the city's landmarks such as the London Eye, Westminster, London Bridge and the O2.

Participants can fundraise for one of the events official charity partners, with Bloodwise and Macmillan being the two gold charities for 2016.

Held annually in London, England, the race attracts a field of elite athletes and in excess of 13,000 competitors and 30,000 spectators to the ExCeL Exhibition Centre, in the London Docklands. Previous winners include Tim Don, Stuart Hayes, Vicky Holland, Helen Jenkins, Jodie Swallow and Emma Snowsill. The 2015 elite male and female races were won by Peter Kerr and Helen Jenkins, respectively. The event is owned by IMG.

Thousands of pounds is raised every year and the 2015 Gold Charity was Macmillan Cancer Support. A large number of companies take part in the corporate waves.

An hour highlights show of the event is broadcast on Channel 4, Sky Sports and British Eurosport in the weeks following the event.

== See also ==
- Sport in London
- London Marathon
