= 2007 NBA Europe Live Tour =

- Sport: Basketball
- Duration: 6–11 October 2007
- Teams: 9

NBA Europe Live Tour seasons
- ← 2006 2008 →

The 2007 NBA Europe Live Tour was a basketball exhibition tour featuring teams from the NBA and teams from Europe's top professional leagues, as part of the NBA Europe Live. The hosting countries were England, Italy, Spain and Turkey. The NBA teams traveled to Europe to begin their training camps, and played a series of exhibition matches against the European teams, and preseason games against other NBA teams. The games took place from October 6 to October 11 and the NBA teams prevailed 5 games to 2 over the European teams.

== Teams ==
The four NBA teams that participated and the locations of their training camps:

- (United States) Boston Celtics, Rome
- (United States) Toronto Raptors, Treviso
- (United States) Memphis Grizzlies, Málaga
- (United States) Minnesota Timberwolves, Istanbul

The European participants:

- (Turkey) Efes Pilsen, TBL
- (Italy) Lottomatica Roma, Serie A (2nd participation)
- (Spain) Unicaja Málaga, ACB
- (Spain) Real Madrid, ACB
- (Spain) Estudiantes, ACB

== Games ==
6 October 2007

Boxscore

Efes Pilsen (Turkey)	81–84	(United States) Minnesota Timberwolves

Abdi İpekçi Arena, Istanbul (Turkey)

6 October 2007

Boxscore

Boston Celtics (United States)	89–85	(Canada) Toronto Raptors

PalaLottomatica, Rome (Italy)

7 October 2007

Boxscore

Lottomatica Roma (Italy)	87–93	(Canada) Toronto Raptors

PalaLottomatica, Rome (Italy)

9 October 2007

Boxscore

Unicaja Málaga (Spain)	102–99	(United States) Memphis Grizzlies

Palacio José María Martín Carpena, Málaga (Spain)

10 October 2007

Boxscore

Minnesota Timberwolves (United States)	81–92	(United States) Boston Celtics

The O2 Arena, London (United Kingdom)

11 October 2007

Boxscore

Estudiantes (Spain)	73–98	(United States) Memphis Grizzlies

Palacio de Deportes, Madrid (Spain)

11 October 2007

Boxscore

Real Madrid (Spain)	104–103	(Canada) Toronto Raptors

Palacio de Deportes, Madrid (Spain)

== Stats ==
Club	Games	Record
(United States) Boston Celtics	2	2-0
(Spain) Real Madrid	1	1-0
(Spain) Unicaja Málaga	1	1-0
(United States) Memphis Grizzlies	2	1–1
(United States) Minnesota Timberwolves	2	1–1
(Canada) Toronto Raptors	3	1-2
(Spain) Estudiantes	1	0-1
(Turkey) Lottomatica Roma	1	0-1
(Italy) Efes Pilsen	1	0-1

Topscorer:

- (Italy) Andrea Bargnani (49 pts - 3 games)

== Notes ==
- The participating teams were announced before Kevin Garnett was traded from the Minnesota Timberwolves to the Boston Celtics, the meeting between his current and former team was coincidental.
- The Boston Celtics were the only team not to play against a FIBA opponent.
- Toronto Raptors forwards Andrea Bargnani and Jorge Garbajosa played for Benetton Treviso before coming to the NBA. Jorge Garbajosa played for Unicaja Málaga as well.

== Trivia ==
- The Grizzlies' loss to Unicaja Málaga and the Raptors' loss to Real Madrid marked the 2nd and 3rd losses, out of 4 games, by NBA franchises to ACB Spanish teams since the beginning of NBA Global Games in 2006.
- The Grizzlies' loss to Unicaja Málaga and the Raptors' loss to Real Madrid marked the 7th and 8th losses by NBA franchises to Euroleague teams since 1978.
- Only Maccabi Tel Aviv (4 times: 1978, 1984 twice, 2005), the Soviet Union National Team (1988), FC Barcelona (2006) and CSKA Moscow (2006) had won against an NBA team before.

== See also ==
- List of NBA versus international games
- McDonald's Championship
