= 2006 NBA Europe Live Tour =

- Sport: Basketball
- Duration: 5–11 October 2006
- Teams: 10

NBA Europe Live Tour seasons
- 2007 →

The 2006 NBA Europe Live Tour was an international basketball exhibition and competition produced jointly by the National Basketball Association and the Euroleague, as part of the NBA Europe Live. The tour featured four NBA teams training and playing matches against European teams in Germany, Russia, France, Italy, and Spain. Four standalone games were played, along with two tournaments in Moscow and Cologne. The tour took place between 5 October and 11 October 2006.

== Summary ==
Four NBA teams went to different countries to conduct their first week of training camp overseas: the Philadelphia 76ers in Barcelona, Spain; the Los Angeles Clippers in Moscow, Russia; the San Antonio Spurs in France; and the Phoenix Suns in Treviso, Italy. The 76ers and the Suns also participated in the Cologne tournament won by the former against CSKA Moscow and led by coach Maurice Cheeks. Allen Iverson was the tournament's topscorer. The Clippers finished second in the Moscow tournament won by CSKA Moscow.
San Antonio Spurs played only one game, while Clippers played two and 76ers with Suns three (including the Cologne tournament).

== Teams ==
The four NBA teams that participated and the locations of their training camps:

- (United States) Philadelphia 76ers, Spain, Cologne
- (United States) San Antonio Spurs, France
- (United States) Los Angeles Clippers, Moscow
- (United States) Phoenix Suns, Treviso, Cologne

The European participants:

- (Russia) BC Khimki, BSL
- (Russia) CSKA Moscow, BSL
- (Italy) Lottomatica Roma, Serie A
- (Israel) Maccabi Tel Aviv
- (Spain) Barcelona, ACB
- (France) ASVEL Basket

== Games ==
=== In France, Italy and Spain ===
5 October 2006

Boxscore

ASVEL Lyon-Villeurbanne (France)	90–115	(United States) San Antonio Spurs

Astroballe, Villeurbanne (France)

5 October 2006

Boxscore

FC Barcelona (Spain)	104–99	(United States) Philadelphia 76ers

Palau Sant Jordi, Barcelona (Spain)

6 October 2006

Boxscore

Lottomatica Roma (Italy)	93–100	(United States) Phoenix Suns

PalaLottomatica, Rome (Italy)

8 October 2006

Boxscore

Maccabi Tel Aviv (Israel)	84–97	(United States) San Antonio Spurs

Palais Omnisports de Paris-Bercy, Paris (France)

=== In Moscow (tournament) ===
5 October 2006

CSKA Moscow (Russia)	94–78	(Russia) BC Khimki

CSKA Universal Sports Hall, Moscow (Russia)

6 October 2006

Boxscore

BC Khimki (Russia)	91–98	(United States) Los Angeles Clippers

CSKA Universal Sports Hall, Moscow (Russia)

7 October 2006

Boxscore

CSKA Moscow (Russia)	94–75	(United States) Los Angeles Clippers

CSKA Universal Sports Hall, Moscow (Russia)

=== In Cologne (tournament) ===
10 October 2006

CSKA Moscow (Russia)	90–81	(Israel) Maccabi Tel Aviv

Kölnarena, Cologne (Germany)

10 October 2006

Boxscore

Philadelphia 76ers (United States)	103–100	(United States) Phoenix Suns

Kölnarena, Cologne (Germany)

11 October 2006

Boxscore

Maccabi Tel Aviv (Israel)	102–119	(United States) Phoenix Suns

Kölnarena, Cologne (Germany)

11 October 2006

Boxscore

CSKA Moscow (Russia)	71–85	(United States) Philadelphia 76ers

Kölnarena, Cologne (Germany)

The tournament was played in a Final Four system as follows:

Semi-finals
10 October
(Russia) CSKA Moscow	90
(Israel) Maccabi Tel Aviv	81
10 October
(United States) Philadelphia 76ers	103
(United States) Phoenix Suns	100

Final
11 October
(Russia) CSKA Moscow	71
(United States) Philadelphia 76ers	85
Third place
11 October
(Israel) Maccabi Tel Aviv	102
(United States) Phoenix Suns	119

- Cologne Tournament Topscorer: (United States) Allen Iverson (57 pts)

== Stats ==
Club	Games	Record
(United States) San Antonio Spurs	2	2–0
(Russia) CSKA Moscow	2	2-0
(United States) Phoenix Suns	3	2–1
(United States) Philadelphia 76ers	3	2–1
(Spain) Barcelona	1	1-0
(United States) Los Angeles Clippers	1	1–1
(France) ASVEL Basket	1	0-1
(Italy) Lottomatica Roma	1	0-1
(Russia) BC Khimki	2	0-2
(Israel) Maccabi Tel Aviv	2	0-2

== Significance ==
Many legendary NBA coaches led their teams in the first edition of the Europe Live Tour, such as Mike Dunleavy Sr. and Greg Popovich, while Mike D'Antoni was the only to coach both in USA and Europe. Ettore Messina was in charge of CSKA Moscow, Dusko Ivanovic of Barcelona and Jasmin Repesa of Roma. The 76ers' loss to FC Barcelona and the Clippers' loss to CSKA Moscow marked the fifth and sixth losses by NBA franchises to Euroleague teams since 1978. Prior to this tournament only Maccabi Tel Aviv (4 times: 1978, 1984 twice, 2005) and the Soviet Union National Team (once in 1988) had beaten an NBA team.

== See also ==
- List of NBA versus international games
- McDonald's Championship

== Sources ==
- 2006 Live tour
- Historical standings
- Attendances
