= 2010 NBA Europe Live Tour =

- Sport: Basketball
- Duration: 3–7 October 2010
- Teams: 5

NBA Europe Live Tour seasons
- ← 2009 2012 →

The 2010 NBA Europe Live Tour was a basketball exhibition tour featuring teams from the NBA and the Euroleague, as a part of the NBA Europe Live. The hosting countries were England, France and Spain.

NBA Europe Live combined with the Euroleague American Tour to create a nine-game global preseason schedule.

== Teams ==
The NBA teams who participated in NBA Europe Live were:

- (United States) Los Angeles Lakers
- (United States) Minnesota Timberwolves (2nd participation)
- (United States) New York Knicks (2nd participation)

The Euroleague teams who participated were:

- (Spain) Barcelona
- (Italy) Olimpia Milano

== Games ==
3 October 2010

Boxscore

New York Knicks (United States)	125–113	(Italy) Olimpia Milano

Mediolanum Forum, Milan (Italy)

4 October 2010

Boxscore

Los Angeles Lakers (United States)	92–111	(United States) Minnesota Timberwolves

The O2 Arena, London (United Kingdom)

6 October 2010

Boxscore

New York Knicks (United States)	100–106	(United States) Minnesota Timberwolves

Palais Omnisports de Paris-Bercy, Paris (France)

7 October 2010

Boxscore

Los Angeles Lakers (United States)	88–92	(Spain) Barcelona

Palau Sant Jordi, Barcelona (Spain)

== Stats ==
Club	Games	Record
(United States) Minnesota Timberwolves	2	2–0
(Spain) Barcelona	1	1–0
(United States) New York Knicks	2	1–1
(Italy) Olimpia Milano	1	0-1
(United States) Los Angeles Lakers	2	0-2

Topscorer:

- (United States) Amar'e Stoudemire (43 pts - 2 games)

== See also ==
- 2010 EuroLeague American Tour
