= 2009 EuroLeague American Tour =

- Sport: Basketball
- Duration: 3-20 October 2009
- Teams: 9

EuroLeague American Tour seasons
- 2010 →

The 2009 Euroleague American Tour inaugurated a yearly basketball exhibition Tour organized by the Euroleague in the United States. The aim of the Euroleague American Tour is to expose to American basketball fans a different basketball approach than the one presented by the NBA, a lot more similar to the NCAA one.

The Euroleague teams that participated in that first edition were Partizan Belgrade, Olympiacos and Maccabi Tel Aviv. On the other hand, the NBA franchises that played against them were the Denver Nuggets, the Phoenix Suns, the San Antonio Spurs, the New York Knicks and the Cleveland Cavaliers. The NBA rules that applied to the event combined with the fact that the opponents were all top class NBA teams led to consecutive losses for the Euroleague representants. In Partizan's case, things were even worse as they competed without future All-Euroleague point guard Bo McCalebb and power forward Lawrence Roberts.

The three EuroLeague teams lost all six games against their NBA opponents.

== Participants ==
Continent	Teams	Clubs					
Europe	3	(Greece) Olympiacos	(Serbia) Partizan Belgrade	(Israel) Maccabi Tel Aviv			
North America	6	(United States) Denver Nuggets	(United States) New York Knicks	(United States) Phoenix Suns	(United States) Cleveland Cavaliers	(United States) San Antonio Spurs	(United States) Los Angeles Clippers

== Games ==
3 October 2009

Boxscore

Partizan Belgrade (Serbia)	70–102	(United States) Denver Nuggets

Pepsi Center, Denver (United States)

6 October 2009

Boxscore

Partizan Belgrade (Serbia)	80–111	(United States) Phoenix Suns

US Airways Center, Phoenix (United States)

9 October 2009

Boxscore

Olympiacos (Greece)	89–107	(United States) San Antonio Spurs

AT&T Center, San Antonio (United States)

12 October 2009

Boxscore

Olympiacos (Greece)	94–111	(United States) Cleveland Cavaliers

Quicken Loans Arena, Cleveland (United States)

18 October 2009

Boxscore

Maccabi Tel Aviv (Israel)	91–106	(United States) New York Knicks

Madison Square Garden, New York (United States)

20 October 2009

Boxscore

Maccabi Tel Aviv (Israel)	98–108	(United States) L.A. Clippers

Staples Center, Los Angeles (United States)

== Stats ==
Club	Games	Record
(United States) Denver Nuggets	1	1–0
(United States) New York Knicks	1	1–0
(United States) Cleveland Cavaliers	1	1–0
(United States) Los Angeles Clippers	1	1–0
(United States) San Antonio Spurs	1	1–0
(United States) Phoenix Suns	1	1–0
(Greece) Olympiacos	2	0-2
(Serbia) Partizan Belgrade	2	0-2
(Israel) Maccabi Tel Aviv	2	0-2

Topscorer:

- (Australia) (Serbia) Aleks Marić (35 pts - 2 games)

== See also ==
- 2010 Euroleague American Tour
