= 2008 NBA Europe Live Tour =

- Sport: Basketball
- Duration: 9–17 October 2008
- Teams: 4

NBA Europe Live Tour seasons
- ← 2007 2009 →

The 2008 NBA Europe Live Tour was a basketball exhibition tour featuring teams from the NBA, as a part of the NBA Europe Live Tour. The hosting countries were England, France, Germany and Spain. The NBA teams traveled to Europe to play preseason games against each other from October 9 to October 17.

== Teams ==
The four NBA teams that participated were:

- (United States) Miami Heat
- (United States) New Jersey Nets
- (United States) New Orleans Hornets
- (United States) Washington Wizards

== Games ==
9 October 2008

Boxscore

New Jersey Nets (United States)	100–98	(United States) Miami Heat

Palais Omnisports de Paris-Bercy, Paris (France)

12 October 2008

Boxscore

New Jersey Nets (United States)	94–92	(United States) Miami Heat

The O2 Arena, London (United Kingdom)

14 October 2008

Boxscore

Washington Wizards (United States)	80–96	(United States) New Orleans Hornets

O2 World, Berlin (Germany)

17 October 2008

Boxscore

Washington Wizards (United States)	80–102	(United States) New Orleans Hornets

Palau Sant Jordi, Barcelona (Spain)

== Stats ==
Club	Games	Record
(United States) New Jersey Nets	2	2-0
(United States) New Orleans Hornets	2	2-0
(United States) Miami Heat	2	0-2
(United States) Washington Wizards	2	0-2

Topscorer:

- (United States) Dwyane Wade (39 pts)
