= EuroLeague American Tour =

Series of basketball games

The EuroLeague American Tour was a series of games organized in 2009, 2010 and 2012. Its purpose was for the EuroLeague and sometimes 2nd-tier level EuroCup teams to play against National Basketball Association teams. The games of the EuroLeague American Tour were played by NBA rules.

The EuroLeague American Tour continued a tradition of friendly competition between NBA and EuroLeague teams that dates back to 1978, when Maccabi Tel Aviv played the Washington Bullets in Tel Aviv, Israel. Combined with the NBA Global Games, that also regularly present clashes between EuroLeague and NBA squads. Many legendary players like LeBron James, Carmelo Anthony, Tony Parker, Tim Duncan, Manu Ginobili have featured in the series from 2006 until 2012.

== History ==
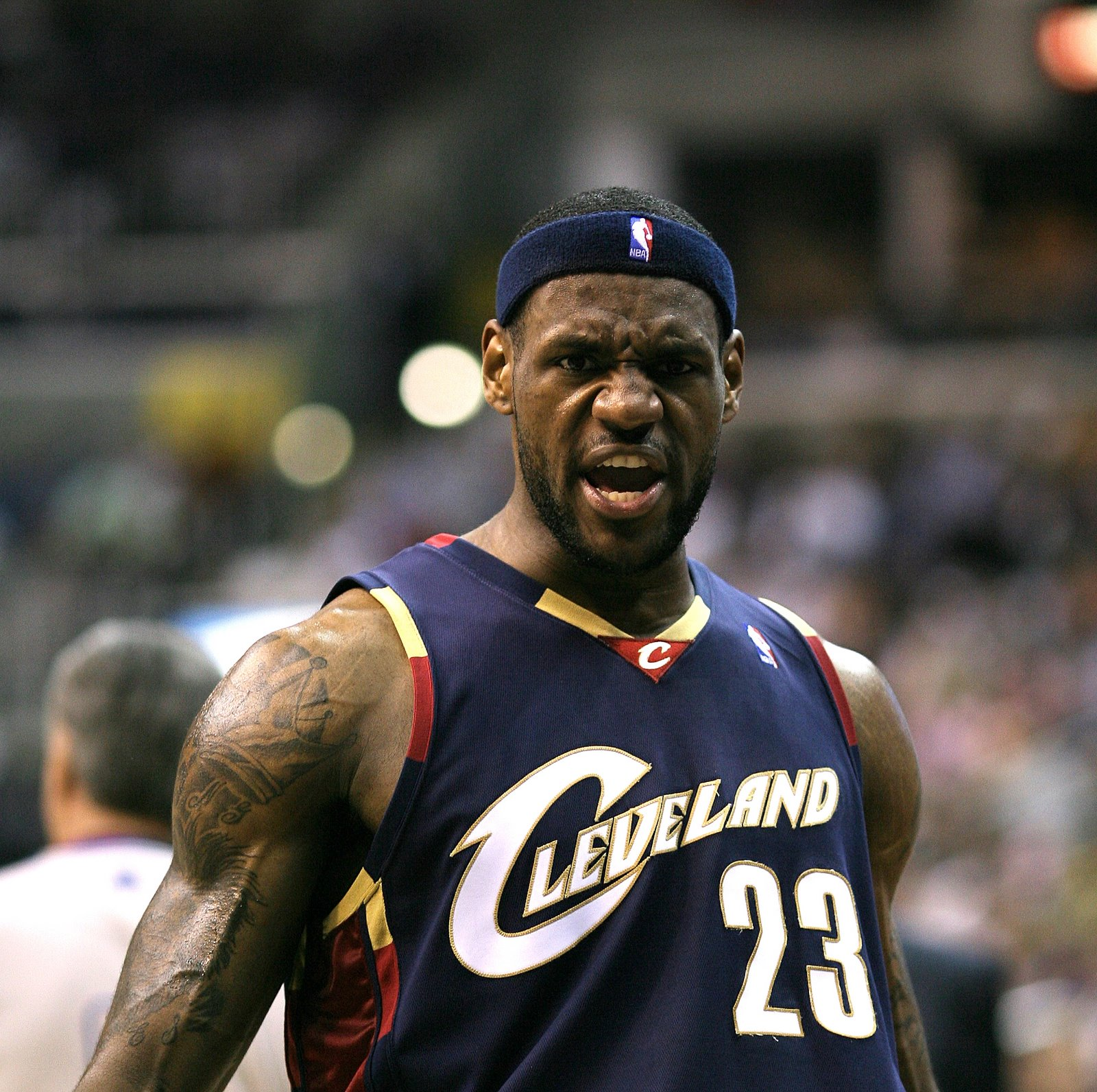
LeBron James participated with the Cleveland Cavaliers in the 2009 edition and with Miami Heat in 2010.

=== 2009 Edition ===
The first event that took place in 2009 involved Olympiacos, Maccabi Tel Aviv and Partizan Belgrade from the EuroLeague. They played against the San Antonio Spurs, the Cleveland Cavaliers, the Denver Nuggets and the Phoenix Suns, losing all four games.

=== 2010 Edition ===
The second event in 2010 involved CSKA Moscow and Caja Laboral against the Memphis Grizzlies, the Miami Heat, the Oklahoma City Thunder, the Cleveland Cavaliers and the San Antonio Spurs.

=== 2012 Edition ===
The third edition of the EuroLeague American Tour took place in 2012, involving Real Madrid and Mens Sana Siena against the Memphis Grizzlies, the Toronto Raptors, the Cleveland Cavaliers and the San Antonio Spurs.

=== Later years (2013-2015) ===
In 2013, CSKA Moscow traveled to the United States to play against the Minnesota Timberwolves and the San Antonio Spurs.

In 2014, Maccabi Tel Aviv played in the USA against the Cleveland Cavaliers and the Brooklyn Nets.

In 2015, Maccabi Tel Aviv played against Olimpia Milano in New York City and Chicago. That was the first time two European teams met to play against each other in the United States.

== Top scorers ==
Year	Player	Points	Games	Team
2009	(Australia) (Serbia) Aleks Marić	35	2	Partizan Belgrade
2010	(Lithuania) Ramunas Siskauskas	54	3	CSKA Moscow
2012	(United States) Bobby Brown	42	2	Mens Sana Siena

== Participations ==
Team	No of Editions	Years
(United States) Cleveland Cavaliers	3	2009, 2010, 2012
(United States) San Antonio Spurs	3	2009, 2010, 2012
(United States) Memphis Grizzlies	2	2010, 2012
(United States) Miami Heat	1	2010
(Canada) Toronto Raptors	1	2012
(United States) Denver Nuggets	1	2009
(United States) Los Angeles Clippers	1	2009
(United States) New York Knicks	1	2009
(Spain) Real Madrid	1	2012
(Spain) Caja Laboral	1	2010
(Italy) Mens Sana Siena	1	2012
(Israel) Maccabi Tel Aviv	1	2009
(Russia) CSKA Moscow	1	2010
(Serbia) Partizan Belgrade	1	2009
(Greece) Olympiacos	1	2009

== See also ==
- NBA Europe Live Tour
- NBA Global Games
- NBA Canada Series
- List of games played between NBA and international teams
- NBA versus EuroLeague games
- McDonald's Championship
- Naismith Cup
