= 2010 EuroLeague American Tour =

Series of basketball games

2009 EuroLeague American Tour
- Sport: Basketball
- Duration: 7-17 October 2010
- Teams: 4

EuroLeague American Tour seasons
- 2012 →

The 2010 Euroleague American Tour was the second American Tour organized by the Euroleague in the USA. The games were part of the NBA's preseason schedule and allowed the Euroleague teams to display some of their very particular characteristics to the American public, even under NBA rules. The Euroleague teams that participated in the second edition were CSKA Moscow and Caja Laboral. On the other hand, the NBA franchises that played against them were the Miami Heat, the Memphis Grizzlies, the San Antonio Spurs, the Oklahoma City Thunder, and the Cleveland Cavaliers.

== Participants ==
Continent	Teams	Clubs				
Europe	2	(Spain) Caja Laboral	(Russia) CSKA Moscow			
North America	5	(United States) Cleveland Cavaliers	(United States) Miami Heat	(United States) Memphis Grizzlies	(United States) Oklahoma City Thunder	(United States) San Antonio Spurs

== Games ==
In the opening game on October 12, CSKA Moscow was determined to compete against the Heat even though they were playing without two starters, Victor Khryapa and J. R. Holden. Miami on the other hand was missing Dwyane Wade and needed LeBron James alongside Chris Bosh to step up. After a first half in which Ramūnas Šiškauskas and Trajan Langdon gave the opposite defense a tough challenge to face, CSKA was leading 44–39. In the second half James and Bosh were the leaders of a Heat comeback that eventually led to a 96–85 victory. They had 22 and 17 points respectively for the winners, whereas Langdon led all CSKA scorers with 20 points, Jamont Gordon had 17 and Šiškauskas 15.

On October 14, Caja Laboral fell short of a victory in Memphis against the Grizzlies, as they lost 110–105. Mike Conley Jr. led all scorers with 27 points, while Sam Young had 21. Mirza Teletović led the Spanish team with 24 points and 9 rebounds, Fernando San Emeterio scored 15 points and Marcelinho Huertas had an all-around performance with 7 points, 5 rebounds and 11 assists. The Thunder played the same day against CSKA in Oklahoma City, winning 97–89. Kevin Durant had 20 points, 5 rebounds and 7 assists for the winners, and Šiškauskas scored 17 for CSKA.

The last day of the tour was a history-changing one, as CSKA beat the Cavaliers to become the first international team ever to defeat an NBA franchise on US soil. In a game where both teams played without several key players (Khryapa and Holden for CSKA, Varejão, Parker, Jamison and Williams for the Cavs), the 2008 Euroleague MVP Ramūnas Šiškauskas made the difference by scoring 22 points and grabbing 5 rebounds. Jamont Gordon also was excellent with 19 points, 7 rebounds and 6 assists, whereas Trajan Langdon's 14 points were more than crucial. Cleveland gave a strong fight mainly through Daniel Gibson who scored 21 points, Ryan Hollins who had 17 and Ramon Sessions with 14. In the other game of the night Caja Laboral was unable to threaten the Spurs in San Antonio losing 108–85. Tony Parker led the winners with 22 points, while David Logan and Mirza Teletović scored 20 and 18 respectively.

12 October 2010

Boxscore

CSKA Moscow (Russia)	85–96	(United States) Miami Heat

AmericanAirlines Arena, Miami (United States)

14 October 2010

Boxscore

Caja Laboral (Spain)	105–110	(United States) Memphis Grizzlies

FedExForum, Memphis, Tennessee (United States)

14 October 2010

Boxscore

CSKA Moscow (Russia)	89–97	(United States) Oklahoma City Thunder

Ford Center, Oklahoma City (United States)

16 October 2010

Boxscore

Caja Laboral (Spain)	85–108	(United States) San Antonio Spurs

AT&T Center, San Antonio (United States)

16 October 2010

Boxscore

CSKA Moscow (Russia)	90–87	(United States) Cleveland Cavaliers

Quicken Loans Arena, Cleveland (United States)

== Stats ==
Club	Games	Record
(United States) Miami Heat	1	1–0
(United States) Memphis Grizzlies	1	1–0
(United States) San Antonio Spurs	1	1–0
(United States) Oklahoma City Thunder	1	1–0
(United States) Cleveland Cavaliers	1	0-1
(Russia) CSKA Moscow	3	1-2
(Spain) Caja Laboral	2	0-2

Topscorer:

- (Lithuania) Ramunas Siskauskas (54 pts - 3 games)

== See also ==
- 2012 Euroleague American Tour
