= List of games played between NBA and international teams =

The following is a history of the list of games played between NBA and international teams. Teams from the National Basketball Association (NBA) have played numerous basketball games against various international teams from around the world. NBA teams, from both the United States and Canada, have played many games against international clubs from various different professional basketball leagues, as well as against some league all-star teams and senior national teams.

== History ==
One of the first basketball games between an NBA and an international team was held in 1978, in Tel Aviv, Israel. Maccabi Tel Aviv of the EuroLeague and Israeli League surprisingly beat the defending NBA champions, the Washington Bullets, by a score of 98–97.

Since then, six other EuroLeague teams have defeated an NBA franchise: Barcelona, Málaga and Real Madrid from the Spanish League, CSKA Moscow of the Russian top-tier level VTB United League, Fenerbahçe from the Turkish League, and Alba Berlin from the German League.

In addition to defeating the Washington Bullets in 1978, Maccabi Tel Aviv also beat the New Jersey Nets and Phoenix Suns in 1984, in Israel, and beat the Toronto Raptors, 103–105, in Toronto in 2005. This was the first loss of an NBA team on North American soil.

The first Barcelona and CSKA wins came during the 2006 NBA Europe Live Tour, where Barcelona beat the Philadelphia 76ers 104–99, and the Moscow team won by 19 over the Los Angeles Clippers (94–75), being the widest victory so far of any international team.

During the 2007 NBA Europe Live Tour, Málaga defeated Memphis Grizzlies 102–99, and Real Madrid overcame Toronto by a narrow 104–103. In 2010, Barcelona and CSKA Moscow again, beat NBA teams, by narrow margins. More recent EuroLeague victories came during the 2012 NBA Europe Live Tour, when Fenerbahçe defeated the Boston Celtics, by a score of 97–91, and Barcelona beat the Dallas Mavericks, by a score of 99–85. In 2013, CSKA beat the Minnesota Timberwolves by a score of 108–106, and in 2014, Alba Berlin beat the San Antonio Spurs by a score of 94–93. In 2016, Real Madrid beat the Oklahoma City Thunder in overtime, by a score of 142–137.

Many of these games were initially played as part of the now-defunct McDonald's Championship, which NBA teams win all of the editions. After 2006, they were mostly played during the NBA Europe Live Tour and the EuroLeague American Tour. In addition to the EuroLeague teams that have beaten NBA teams, one senior men's European national team, the Soviet Union, beat the Atlanta Hawks, by a score of 132–123, in an exhibition game in Moscow, in 1988.

So far, only one non-European team has beaten an NBA team (Israeli teams participate in European competitions). The Adelaide 36ers, a team from the NBL, which is the top-tier professional league of Australia and New Zealand, beat the Phoenix Suns, by a score 134–124, in 2022.

== NBA vs. international teams ==
=== 1970s ===
8 September 1978

Report

Washington Bullets (United States)	97–98	(Israel) Maccabi Elite Tel Aviv

(Israel) Yad Eliyahu Arena, Tel Aviv

24 August 1979

Report

Washington Bullets (United States)	96–85	(China) Bayi Rockets

(China) Beijing

29 August 1979

Washington Bullets (United States)	113–80	China

(China) Shanghai

4 September 1979

Report

Washington Bullets (United States)	133–123	Philippines All-Stars

(Philippines) Araneta Coliseum, Quezon City

=== 1980s ===
24 August 1984

Seattle SuperSonics (United States)	94–87	(West Germany) SSV Hagen

(West Germany) Ischelandhalle, Hagen

25 August 1984

Seattle SuperSonics (United States)	119–95	(West Germany) ASC 1846 Göttingen

(West Germany) Georg-Sehring-Halle, Langen

28 August 1984

Phoenix Suns (United States)	111–91	(Israel) Hapoel Tel Aviv

(Israel) Yad Eliyahu Arena, Tel Aviv

28 August 1984

New Jersey Nets (United States)	97–104	(Israel) Maccabi Elite Tel Aviv

(Israel) Yad Eliyahu Arena, Tel Aviv

29 August 1984

New Jersey Nets (United States)	101–82	(Israel) Hapoel Tel Aviv

(Israel) Yad Eliyahu Arena, Tel Aviv

29 August 1984

Phoenix Suns (United States)	98–113	(Israel) Maccabi Elite Tel Aviv

(Israel) Yad Eliyahu Arena, Tel Aviv

29 August 1984

Seattle SuperSonics (United States)	123–101	(Italy) Benetton Treviso

(Italy) Palaverde, Villorba

31 August 1984

Seattle SuperSonics (United States)	111–110	(Switzerland) Vevey

(Switzerland) Galeries du Rivage, Vevey

5 September 1984

Seattle SuperSonics (United States)	106–76	(West Germany) ASC 1846 Göttingen

(West Germany) Georg-Sehring-Halle, Langen

5 September 1984

Phoenix Suns (United States)	127–109	(Italy) Ciaocrem Varese

(Italy) Palazzo dello Sport di San Siro, Milan

5 September 1984

New Jersey Nets (United States)	127–80	(Italy) Simac Milano

(Italy) Palazzo dello Sport di San Siro, Milan

7 September 1984

Phoenix Suns (United States)	118–93	(Italy) Simac Milano

(Italy) Palazzo dello Sport di Piazza Azzarita, Bologna

7 September 1984

New Jersey Nets (United States)	142–106	(Italy) Granarolo Bologna

(Italy) Palazzo dello Sport di Piazza Azzarita, Bologna

9 September 1984

Seattle SuperSonics (United States)	109–86	(West Germany) Bayer 04 Leverkusen

(West Germany) Wilhelm-Dopatka-Halle Leverkusen

9 September 1984

Phoenix Suns (United States)	121–87	(Italy) Granarolo Bologna

(Italy) Palazzo dello Sport Lino Oldrini, Varese

9 September 1984

New Jersey Nets (United States)	123–111	(Italy) Ciaocrem Varese

(Italy) Palazzo dello Sport Lino Oldrini, Varese

23 October 1987

Milwaukee Bucks (United States)	123–111	(Italy) Tracer Milano

(United States) The MECCA, Milwaukee

25 October 1987

Milwaukee Bucks (United States)	127–100	Soviet Union

(United States) The MECCA, Milwaukee

25 July 1988

Atlanta Hawks (United States)	85–84	Soviet Union

(Soviet Union) Tbilisi Sports Palace, Tbilisi

27 July 1988

Atlanta Hawks (United States)	110–105 (OT)	Soviet Union

(Soviet Union) Sporto Rūmai, Vilnius

30 July 1988

Atlanta Hawks (United States)	123–132	Soviet Union

(Soviet Union) Lenin Sports Palace, Moscow

9 October 1988

Philadelphia 76ers (United States)	108–107	(Israel) Maccabi Elite Tel Aviv

(United States) The Spectrum, Philadelphia

21 October 1988

Boston Celtics (United States)	113–85	(Socialist Federal Republic of Yugoslavia) Yugoslavia

(Spain) Palacio de Deportes, Madrid

23 October 1988

Boston Celtics (United States)	111–96	(Spain) Real Madrid

(Spain) Palacio de Deportes, Madrid

12 October 1989

Miami Heat (United States)	101–95	(Israel) Maccabi Elite Tel Aviv

(United States) Miami Arena, Miami

20 October 1989

Denver Nuggets (United States)	137–103	(Spain) FC Barcelona Banca Catalana

(Italy) PalaEUR, Rome

22 October 1989

Denver Nuggets (United States)	135–129	(Socialist Federal Republic of Yugoslavia) Jugoplastika

(Italy) PalaEUR, Rome

=== 1990s ===
11 October 1990

New York Knicks (United States)	119–115 (OT)	(Italy) Scavolini Pesaro

(Spain) Palau Sant Jordi, Barcelona

13 October 1990

New York Knicks (United States)	117–101	(Socialist Federal Republic of Yugoslavia) POP 84

(Spain) Palau Sant Jordi, Barcelona

16 October 1990

Los Angeles Lakers (United States)	129–106	(Israel) Maccabi Elite Tel Aviv

(United States) The Forum, Inglewood

18 October 1991

Los Angeles Lakers (United States)	132–101	(France) Limoges CSP

(France) Palais Omnisports de Paris-Bercy, Paris

19 October 1991

Los Angeles Lakers (United States)	116–114	(Spain) Montigalà Joventut

(France) Palais Omnisports de Paris-Bercy, Paris

24 October 1991

Los Angeles Clippers (United States)	146–112	(Israel) Maccabi Elite Tel Aviv

(United States) San Diego Sports Arena, San Diego

27 October 1991

Los Angeles Clippers (United States)	98–93	(Israel) Maccabi Elite Tel Aviv

(United States) LA Memorial Sports Arena, Los Angeles

22 October 1993

Phoenix Suns (United States)	145–115	(Spain) Real Madrid Teka

(Germany) Olympiahalle, Munich

23 October 1993

Phoenix Suns (United States)	112–90	(Italy) Buckler Beer Bologna

(Germany) Olympiahalle, Munich

20 October 1994

Golden State Warriors (United States)	122–104	(Spain) 7up Joventut

(Spain) Pavelló Olímpic de Badalona, Badalona

21 October 1994

Charlotte Hornets (United States)	114–107	(Italy) Buckler Beer Bologna

(Italy) PalaMalaguti, Casalecchio di Reno

20 October 1995

Houston Rockets (United States)	116–72	(Australia) Perth Wildcats

(United Kingdom) London Arena, London

21 October 1995

Houston Rockets (United States)	126–112	(Italy) Buckler Beer Bologna

(United Kingdom) London Arena, London

17 October 1997

Chicago Bulls (United States)	89–82	(France) PSG Racing

(France) Palais Omnisports de Paris-Bercy, Paris

18 October 1997

Chicago Bulls (United States)	104–78	(Greece) Olympiacos

(France) Palais Omnisports de Paris-Bercy, Paris

11 October 1999

Miami Heat (United States)	126–91	(Israel) Maccabi Elite Tel Aviv

(Israel) Yad Eliyahu Arena, Tel Aviv

15 October 1999

San Antonio Spurs (United States)	96–86	(Italy) Varese Roosters

(Italy) Fila Forum, Assago

16 October 1999

San Antonio Spurs (United States)	103–68	(Brazil) Vasco da Gama

(Italy) Fila Forum, Assago

Games played under NBA rules:

=== 2000s ===
10 October 2003

Report

Memphis Grizzlies (United States)	91–80	(Spain) FC Barcelona

(Spain) Palau Sant Jordi, Barcelona

10 October 2003

Toronto Raptors (Canada)	100–76	(Greece) Panathinaikos

Air Canada Centre, Toronto

20 October 2004

Toronto Raptors (Canada)	86–83	(Italy) Benetton Treviso

Air Canada Centre, Toronto

16 October 2005

Toronto Raptors (Canada)	103–105	(Israel) Maccabi Elite Tel Aviv

Air Canada Centre, Toronto

19 October 2005

Orlando Magic (United States)	93–79	(Israel) Maccabi Elite Tel Aviv

(United States) TD Waterhouse Centre, Orlando

5 October 2006

Boxscore

San Antonio Spurs (United States)	115–90	(France) ASVEL

(France) Astroballe, Villeurbanne

5 October 2006

Boxscore

Philadelphia 76ers (United States)	99–104	(Spain) Winterthur FC Barcelona

(Spain) Palau Sant Jordi, Barcelona

6 October 2006

Boxscore

Phoenix Suns (United States)	100–93	(Italy) Lottomatica Roma

(Italy) PalaLottomatica, Rome

6 October 2006

Boxscore

Los Angeles Clippers (United States)	98–91	(Russia) Khimki

(Russia) CSKA Universal Sports Hall, Moscow

7 October 2006

Boxscore

Los Angeles Clippers (United States)	75–94	(Russia) CSKA Moscow

(Russia) CSKA Universal Sports Hall, Moscow

8 October 2006

Boxscore

San Antonio Spurs (United States)	97–84	(Israel) Maccabi Elite Tel Aviv

(France) Palais Omnisports de Paris-Bercy, Paris

10 October 2006

Boxscore

Denver Nuggets (United States)	118–102	(Turkey) Efes Pilsen

(United States) Pepsi Center, Denver

11 October 2006

Boxscore

Phoenix Suns (United States)	119–102	(Israel) Maccabi Elite Tel Aviv

(Germany) Kölnarena, Cologne

11 October 2006

Boxscore

Philadelphia 76ers (United States)	85–71	(Russia) CSKA Moscow

(Germany) Kölnarena, Cologne

12 October 2006

Boxscore

Golden State Warriors (United States)	120–66	(Turkey) Efes Pilsen

(United States) Oracle Arena, Oakland

17 October 2006

Boxscore

Cleveland Cavaliers (United States)	93–67	(Israel) Maccabi Elite Tel Aviv

(United States) Quicken Loans Arena, Cleveland

19 October 2006

Boxscore

Toronto Raptors (Canada)	118–84	(Israel) Maccabi Elite Tel Aviv

Air Canada Centre, Toronto

6 October 2007

Boxscore

Minnesota Timberwolves (United States)	84–81	(Turkey) Efes Pilsen

(Turkey) Abdi İpekçi Arena, Istanbul

7 October 2007

Boxscore

Toronto Raptors (Canada)	93–87	(Italy) Lottomatica Roma

(Italy) PalaLottomatica, Rome

9 October 2007

Boxscore

Memphis Grizzlies (United States)	99–102	(Spain) Unicaja

(Spain) Palacio José María Martín Carpena, Málaga

11 October 2007

Boxscore

Memphis Grizzlies (United States)	98–73	(Spain) MMT Estudiantes

(Spain) Palacio de Deportes, Madrid

11 October 2007

Boxscore

Toronto Raptors (Canada)	103–104	(Spain) Real Madrid

(Spain) Palacio de Deportes, Madrid

11 October 2007

Boxscore

New York Knicks (United States)	112–85	(Israel) Maccabi Elite Tel Aviv

(United States) Madison Square Garden, New York City

11 October 2007

Boxscore

Houston Rockets (United States)	107–70	(Greece) Panathinaikos

(United States) Toyota Center, Houston

13 October 2007

Boxscore

San Antonio Spurs (United States)	113–91	(Greece) Panathinaikos

(United States) AT&T Center, San Antonio

15 October 2007

Boxscore

Golden State Warriors (United States)	107–88	(Lithuania) Žalgiris

(United States) Oracle Arena, Oakland

17 October 2007

Boxscore

Toronto Raptors (Canada)	105–99	(Lithuania) Žalgiris

Air Canada Centre, Toronto

18 October 2007

Boxscore

Orlando Magic (United States)	116–92	China

Venetian Arena, Macau

19 October 2007

Boxscore

Washington Wizards (United States)	115–96	(Lithuania) Žalgiris

(United States) Verizon Center, Washington, D.C.

10 October 2008

Boxscore

Orlando Magic (United States)	94–66	(Russia) CSKA Moscow

(United States) Amway Arena, Orlando

14 October 2008

Boxscore

Toronto Raptors (Canada)	86–78	(Russia) CSKA Moscow

Air Canada Centre, Toronto

18 October 2008

Boxscore

Los Angeles Lakers (United States)	108–104	(Spain) Regal FC Barcelona

(United States) Staples Center, Los Angeles

19 October 2008

Boxscore

Los Angeles Clippers (United States)	114–109	(Spain) Regal FC Barcelona

(United States) Staples Center, Los Angeles

21 October 2008

Boxscore

Golden State Warriors (United States)	126–106	(Lithuania) Lietuvos rytas

(United States) Oracle Arena, Oakland

3 October 2009

Boxscore

Denver Nuggets (United States)	102–70	(Serbia) Partizan

(United States) Pepsi Center, Denver

6 October 2009

Boxscore

Phoenix Suns (United States)	111–80	(Serbia) Partizan

(United States) US Airways Center, Phoenix

8 October 2009

Boxscore

Utah Jazz (United States)	109–87	(Spain) Real Madrid

(Spain) Palacio de Deportes, Madrid

9 October 2009

Boxscore

San Antonio Spurs (United States)	107–89	(Greece) Olympiacos

(United States) AT&T Center, San Antonio

12 October 2009

Boxscore

Cleveland Cavaliers (United States)	111–94	(Greece) Olympiacos

(United States) Quicken Loans Arena, Cleveland

18 October 2009

Boxscore

New York Knicks (United States)	106–91	(Israel) Maccabi Electra Tel Aviv

(United States) Madison Square Garden, New York City

20 October 2009

Boxscore

Los Angeles Clippers (United States)	108–96	(Israel) Maccabi Electra Tel Aviv

(United States) Staples Center, Los Angeles

=== 2010s ===
3 October 2010

Boxscore

New York Knicks (United States)	125–113	(Italy) Armani Jeans Milano

(Italy) Mediolanum Forum, Assago

3 October 2010

Boxscore

New Jersey Nets (United States)	108–70	(Israel) Maccabi Haifa

(United States) Prudential Center, Newark

7 October 2010

Boxscore

Los Angeles Lakers (United States)	88–92	(Spain) Regal FC Barcelona

(Spain) Palau Sant Jordi, Barcelona

12 October 2010

Boxscore

Miami Heat (United States)	96–85	(Russia) CSKA Moscow

(United States) American Airlines Arena, Miami

14 October 2010

Boxscore

Memphis Grizzlies (United States)	110–105	(Spain) Caja Laboral

(United States) FedExForum, Memphis

14 October 2010

Boxscore

Oklahoma City Thunder (United States)	97–89	(Russia) CSKA Moscow

(United States) Ford Center, Oklahoma City

16 October 2010

Boxscore

San Antonio Spurs (United States)	108–85	(Spain) Caja Laboral

(United States) AT&T Center, San Antonio

16 October 2010

Boxscore

Cleveland Cavaliers (United States)	87–90	(Russia) CSKA Moscow

(United States) Quicken Loans Arena, Cleveland

5 October 2012

Boxscore

Boston Celtics (United States)	91–97	(Turkey) Fenerbahçe Ülker

(Turkey) Ülker Sports Arena, Istanbul

6 October 2012

Boxscore

Dallas Mavericks (United States)	89–84	(Germany) Alba Berlin

(Germany) O_{2} World, Berlin

6 October 2012

Boxscore

Memphis Grizzlies (United States)	105–93	(Spain) Real Madrid

(United States) FedExForum, Memphis

6 October 2012

Boxscore

San Antonio Spurs (United States)	106–77	(Italy) Montepaschi Siena

(United States) AT&T Center, San Antonio

7 October 2012

Boxscore

Boston Celtics (United States)	105–75	(Italy) EA7 Emporio Armani Milano

(Italy) Mediolanum Forum, Assago

8 October 2012

Boxscore

Toronto Raptors (Canada)	102–95	(Spain) Real Madrid

Air Canada Centre, Toronto

8 October 2012

Boxscore

Cleveland Cavaliers (United States)	91–85	(Italy) Montepaschi Siena

(United States) Quicken Loans Arena, Cleveland

9 October 2012

Boxscore

Dallas Mavericks (United States)	85–99	(Spain) FC Barcelona Regal

(Spain) Palau Sant Jordi, Barcelona

11 October 2012

Boxscore

Golden State Warriors (United States)	108–100	(Israel) Maccabi Haifa

(United States) Oracle Arena, Oakland

16 October 2012

Boxscore

Minnesota Timberwolves (United States)	114–81	(Israel) Maccabi Haifa

(United States) Target Center, Minneapolis

5 October 2013

Boxscore

Oklahoma City Thunder (United States)	95–82	(Turkey) Fenerbahçe Ülker

(Turkey) Ülker Sports Arena, Istanbul

6 October 2013

Boxscore

Philadelphia 76ers (United States)	106–104	(Spain) Bilbao

(Spain) Bizkaia Arena, Barakaldo

7 October 2013

Boxscore

Minnesota Timberwolves (United States)	106–108 (OT)	(Russia) CSKA Moscow

(United States) Target Center, Minneapolis

7 October 2013

Boxscore

Phoenix Suns (United States)	130–89	(Israel) Maccabi Haifa

(United States) US Airways Center, Phoenix

8 October 2013

Boxscore

Detroit Pistons (United States)	91–69	(Israel) Maccabi Haifa

(United States) Palace of Auburn Hills, Auburn Hills

9 October 2013

Boxscore

San Antonio Spurs (United States)	95–93 (OT)	(Russia) CSKA Moscow

(United States) AT&T Center, San Antonio

13 October 2013

Boxscore

Memphis Grizzlies (United States)	116–70	(Israel) Maccabi Haifa

(United States) FedExForum, Memphis

5 October 2014

Boxscore

Cleveland Cavaliers (United States)	107–80	(Israel) Maccabi Electra Tel Aviv

(United States) Quicken Loans Arena, Cleveland

7 October 2014

Boxscore

Brooklyn Nets (United States)	111–94	(Israel) Maccabi Electra Tel Aviv

(United States) Barclays Center, New York City

8 October 2014

Boxscore

San Antonio Spurs (United States)	93–94	(Germany) Alba Berlin

(Germany) O_{2} World, Berlin

8 October 2014

Boxscore

Phoenix Suns (United States)	100–88	(Brazil) Flamengo

(United States) US Airways Center, Phoenix

11 October 2014

Boxscore

San Antonio Spurs (United States)	96–90	(Turkey) Fenerbahçe Ülker

(Turkey) Ülker Sports Arena, Istanbul

15 October 2014

Boxscore

Orlando Magic (United States)	106–88	(Brazil) Flamengo

(United States) Amway Center, Orlando

15 October 2014

Boxscore

Washington Wizards (United States)	101–95	(Israel) Maccabi Haifa

(United States) Verizon Center, Washington, D.C.

17 October 2014

Boxscore

Memphis Grizzlies (United States)	112–72	(Brazil) Flamengo

(United States) FedExForum, Memphis

17 October 2014

Boxscore

Portland Trail Blazers (United States)	121–74	(Israel) Maccabi Haifa

(United States) Moda Center, Portland

18 October 2014

Boxscore

Sacramento Kings (United States)	91–59	(Israel) Maccabi Haifa

(United States) Sleep Train Arena, Sacramento

22 October 2014

Boxscore

Toronto Raptors (Canada)	92–85	(Israel) Maccabi Haifa

Air Canada Centre, Toronto

5 October 2015

Boxscore

Brooklyn Nets (United States)	96–101	(Turkey) Fenerbahçe

(United States) Barclays Center, New York City

6 October 2015

Boxscore

Boston Celtics (United States)	124–91	(Italy) EA7 Emporio Armani Milano

(Italy) Mediolanum Forum, Assago

7 October 2015

Boxscore

New York Knicks (United States)	100–81	(Brazil) Bauru

(United States) Madison Square Garden, New York City

8 October 2015

Boxscore

Boston Celtics (United States)	111–96	(Spain) Real Madrid

(Spain) Barclaycard Center, Madrid

8 October 2015

Boxscore

Memphis Grizzlies (United States)	97–84	(Israel) Maccabi Haifa

(United States) FedExForum, Memphis

9 October 2015

Boxscore

Oklahoma City Thunder (United States)	111–81	(Turkey) Fenerbahçe

(United States) Chesapeake Energy Arena, Oklahoma City

11 October 2015

Boxscore

Washington Wizards (United States)	134–100	(Brazil) Bauru

(United States) Verizon Center, Washington, D.C.

11 October 2015

Boxscore

Los Angeles Lakers (United States)	126–83	(Israel) Maccabi Haifa

(United States) Staples Center, Los Angeles

17 October 2015

Boxscore

Orlando Magic (United States)	90–73	(Brazil) Flamengo

(Brazil) HSBC Arena, Rio de Janeiro

2 October 2016

Boxscore

Houston Rockets (United States)	131–94	(China) Shanghai Sharks

(United States) Toyota Center, Houston

3 October 2016

Boxscore

Oklahoma City Thunder (United States)	137–142 (OT)	(Spain) Real Madrid

(Spain) Barclaycard Center, Madrid

5 October 2016

Boxscore

Oklahoma City Thunder (United States)	92–89	(Spain) FC Barcelona Lassa

(Spain) Palau Sant Jordi, Barcelona

10 October 2016

Boxscore

Sacramento Kings (United States)	135–96	(Israel) Maccabi Haifa

(United States) Golden 1 Center, Sacramento

14 October 2016

Boxscore

Toronto Raptors (Canada)	122–105	(Argentina) San Lorenzo

Air Canada Centre, Toronto

2 October 2017

Boxscore

Washington Wizards (United States)	126–96	(China) Guangzhou Long-Lions

(United States) Capital One Arena, Washington, D.C.

2 October 2017

Boxscore

Utah Jazz (United States)	108–83	(Australia) Sydney Kings

(United States) Vivint Smart Home Arena, Salt Lake City

4 October 2017

Boxscore

Utah Jazz (United States)	117–78	(Israel) Maccabi Haifa

(United States) Vivint Smart Home Arena, Salt Lake City

5 October 2017

Boxscore

Houston Rockets (United States)	144–82	(China) Shanghai Sharks

(United States) Toyota Center, Houston

8 October 2017

Boxscore

Oklahoma City Thunder (United States)	86–85	(Australia) Melbourne United

(United States) Chesapeake Energy Arena, Oklahoma City

10 October 2017

Boxscore

Indiana Pacers (United States)	108–89	(Israel) Maccabi Haifa

(United States) Bankers Life Fieldhouse, Indianapolis

13 October 2017

Boxscore

Portland Trail Blazers (United States)	129–81	(Israel) Maccabi Haifa

(United States) Moda Center, Portland

13 October 2017

Boxscore

Phoenix Suns (United States)	114–93	(Australia) Brisbane Bullets

(United States) Talking Stick Resort Arena, Phoenix

28 September 2018

Boxscore

Philadelphia 76ers (United States)	104–84	(Australia) Melbourne United

(United States) Wells Fargo Center, Philadelphia

29 September 2018

Boxscore

Dallas Mavericks (United States)	116–63	(China) Beijing Ducks

(United States) American Airlines Center, Dallas

29 September 2018

Boxscore

Utah Jazz (United States)	130–72	(Australia) Perth Wildcats

(United States) Vivint Smart Home Arena, Salt Lake City

30 September 2018

Boxscore

Los Angeles Clippers (United States)	110–91	(Australia) Sydney Kings

(United States) Stan Sheriff Center, Honolulu

3 October 2018

Boxscore

Phoenix Suns (United States)	91–86	New Zealand Breakers

(United States) Talking Stick Resort Arena, Phoenix

5 October 2018

Boxscore

Orlando Magic (United States)	119–82	(Brazil) Flamengo

(United States) Amway Center, Orlando

5 October 2018

Boxscore

Toronto Raptors (Canada)	120–82	(Australia) Melbourne United

(Canada) Scotiabank Arena, Toronto

5 October 2018

Boxscore

Denver Nuggets (United States)	96–88	(Australia) Perth Wildcats

(United States) Pepsi Center, Denver

5 October 2018

Boxscore

Utah Jazz (United States)	129–99	(Australia) Adelaide 36ers

(United States) Vivint Smart Home Arena, Salt Lake City

8 October 2018

Boxscore

Sacramento Kings (United States)	132–100	(Israel) Maccabi Haifa

(United States) Golden 1 Center, Sacramento

9 October 2018

Boxscore

Houston Rockets (United States)	128–86	(China) Shanghai Sharks

(United States) Toyota Center, Houston

11 October 2018

Boxscore

Los Angeles Clippers (United States)	124–76	(Israel) Maccabi Haifa

(United States) Staples Center, Los Angeles

12 October 2018

Boxscore

Washington Wizards (United States)	140–111	(China) Guangzhou Long-Lions

(United States) Capital One Arena, Washington, D.C.

30 September 2019

Boxscore

Houston Rockets (United States)	140–71	(China) Shanghai Sharks

(United States) Toyota Center, Houston

4 October 2019

Boxscore

Brooklyn Nets (United States)	137–89	(Brazil) Sesi/Franca

(United States) Barclays Center, New York City

5 October 2019

Boxscore

Utah Jazz (United States)	133–81	(Australia) Adelaide 36ers

(United States) Vivint Smart Home Arena, Salt Lake City

6 October 2019

Boxscore

Memphis Grizzlies (United States)	123–88	(Israel) Maccabi Haifa

(United States) FedExForum, Memphis

6 October 2019

Boxscore

Los Angeles Clippers (United States)	127–87	(China) Shanghai Sharks

(United States) Stan Sheriff Center, Honolulu

7 October 2019

Boxscore

Cleveland Cavaliers (United States)	120–89	(Argentina) San Lorenzo

(United States) Rocket Mortgage FieldHouse, Cleveland

8 October 2019

Boxscore

Memphis Grizzlies (United States)	108–94	New Zealand Breakers

(United States) FedExForum, Memphis

8 October 2019

Boxscore

Philadelphia 76ers (United States)	144–86	(China) Guangzhou Long-Lions

(United States) Wells Fargo Center, Philadelphia

9 October 2019

Boxscore

Washington Wizards (United States)	137–98	(China) Guangzhou Long-Lions

(United States) Verizon Center, Washington, D.C.

10 October 2019

Boxscore

Portland Trail Blazers (United States)	104–68	(Israel) Maccabi Haifa

(United States) Moda Center, Portland

10 October 2019

Boxscore

Oklahoma City Thunder (United States)	110–84	New Zealand Breakers

(United States) Chesapeake Energy Arena, Oklahoma City

13 October 2019

Boxscore

Minnesota Timberwolves (United States)	131–101	(Israel) Maccabi Haifa

(United States) Target Center, Minneapolis

13 October 2019

Boxscore

Los Angeles Clippers (United States)	118–100	(Australia) Melbourne United

(United States) Staples Center, Los Angeles

=== 2020s ===
30 September 2022

Boxscore

Los Angeles Clippers (United States)	121–81	(Israel) Maccabi Ra'anana

(United States) Climate Pledge Arena, Seattle

2 October 2022

Boxscore

Phoenix Suns (United States)	124–134	(Australia) Adelaide 36ers

(United States) Footprint Center, Phoenix

6 October 2022

Boxscore

Oklahoma City Thunder (United States)	131–98	(Australia) Adelaide 36ers

(United States) Paycom Center, Oklahoma City

6 October 2022

Boxscore

Portland Trail Blazers (United States)	138–85	(Israel) Maccabi Ra'anana

(United States) Moda Center, Portland

9 October 2022

Boxscore

Oklahoma City Thunder (United States)	144–97	(Israel) Maccabi Ra'anana

(United States) Paycom Center, Oklahoma City

10 October 2023

Boxscore

Dallas Mavericks (United States)	123–127	(Spain) Real Madrid

(Spain) WiZink Center, Madrid

10 October 2023

Boxscore

Portland Trail Blazers (United States)	106–66	New Zealand Breakers

(United States) Moda Center, Portland

10 October 2023

Boxscore

Washington Wizards (United States)	145–82	(Australia) Cairns Taipans

(United States) Capital One Arena, Washington, D.C.

12 October 2023

Boxscore

Brooklyn Nets (United States)	135–103	(Israel) Maccabi Ra'anana

(United States) Barclays Center, New York City

15 October 2023

Boxscore

Toronto Raptors (Canada)	134–93	(Australia) Cairns Taipans

(Canada) Scotiabank Arena, Toronto

16 October 2023

Boxscore

Cleveland Cavaliers (United States)	120–89	(Israel) Maccabi Ra'anana

(United States) Rocket Mortgage FieldHouse, Cleveland

16 October 2023

Boxscore

Utah Jazz (United States)	114–94	New Zealand Breakers

(United States) Delta Center, Salt Lake City

17 October 2023

Boxscore

Minnesota Timberwolves (United States)	138–111	(Israel) Maccabi Ra'anana

(United States) Target Center, Minneapolis

20 October 2023

Boxscore

Orlando Magic (United States)	109–76	(Brazil) Flamengo

(United States) Amway Center, Orlando

4 October 2024

Boxscore

Utah Jazz (United States)	116–87	New Zealand Breakers

(United States) Delta Center, Salt Lake City

7 October 2024

Boxscore

Philadelphia 76ers (United States)	139–84	New Zealand Breakers

(United States) Wells Fargo Center, Philadelphia

10 October 2024

Boxscore

Oklahoma City Thunder (United States)	117–89	New Zealand Breakers

(United States) BOK Center, Tulsa

16 October 2024

Boxscore

Portland Trail Blazers (United States)	111–100	(Germany) Ratiopharm Ulm

(United States) Moda Center, Portland

3 October 2025

Boxscore

New Orleans Pelicans (United States)	107–97	(Australia) Melbourne United

(Australia) Rod Laver Arena, Melbourne

4 October 2025

Boxscore

Brooklyn Nets (United States)	123–88	(Israel) Hapoel Jerusalem

(United States) Barclays Center, New York City

5 October 2025

Boxscore

New Orleans Pelicans (United States)	127–92	(Australia) South East Melbourne Phoenix

(Australia) Rod Laver Arena, Melbourne

6 October 2025

Boxscore

San Antonio Spurs (United States)	119–88	(China) Guangzhou Loong Lions

(United States) Frost Bank Center, San Antonio

9 October 2025

Boxscore

Los Angeles Clippers (United States)	142–95	(China) Guangzhou Loong Lions

(United States) Frontwave Arena, Oceanside

13 October 2025

Boxscore

Minnesota Timberwolves (United States)	134–74	(China) Guangzhou Loong Lions

(United States) Target Center, Minneapolis

12 October 2026

Boxscore

Portland Trail Blazers (United States)	119–66	(United Kingdom) London Lions

(United States) Moda Center, Portland

== Team, league, and country records ==
=== NBA teams ===
Team	GP	W	L	Pct
(United States) Atlanta Hawks	3	2	1	.667
(United States) Boston Celtics	6	5	1	.833
(United States) Brooklyn / New Jersey Nets	11	9	2	.818
(United States) Charlotte Hornets	1	1	0	1.000
(United States) Chicago Bulls	2	2	0	1.000
(United States) Cleveland Cavaliers	7	6	1	.857
(United States) Dallas Mavericks	4	2	2	.500
(United States) Denver Nuggets	5	5	0	1.000
(United States) Detroit Pistons	1	1	0	1.000
(United States) Golden State Warriors	5	5	0	1.000
(United States) Houston Rockets	7	7	0	1.000
(United States) Indiana Pacers	1	1	0	1.000
(United States) Los Angeles Clippers	12	11	1	.917
(United States) Los Angeles Lakers	6	5	1	.833
(United States) Memphis Grizzlies	10	9	1	.900
(United States) Miami Heat	3	3	0	1.000
(United States) Milwaukee Bucks	2	2	0	1.000
(United States) Minnesota Timberwolves	6	5	1	.833
(United States) New Orleans Pelicans	2	2	0	1.000
(United States) New York Knicks	6	6	0	1.000
(United States) Oklahoma City Thunder	9	8	1	.889
(United States) Orlando Magic	7	7	0	1.000
(United States) Philadelphia 76ers	6	5	1	.833
(United States) Phoenix Suns	15	13	2	.867
(United States) Portland Trail Blazers	6	6	0	1.000
(United States) Sacramento Kings	3	3	0	1.000
(United States) San Antonio Spurs	12	11	1	.917
(United States) Seattle SuperSonics	6	6	0	1.000
(Canada) Toronto Raptors	13	11	2	.846
(United States) Utah Jazz	7	7	0	1.000
(United States) Washington Wizards (Bullets)	11	10	1	.909
Totals	188	169	19	.899

=== International teams ===
Team	GP	W	L	Pct
(Australia) Adelaide 36ers	4	1	3	.250
(Germany) Alba Berlin	2	1	1	.333
(Turkey) Anadolu Efes	3	0	3	.000
(France) ASVEL	1	0	1	.000
(Spain) Baskonia	2	0	2	.000
(Brazil) Bauru	2	0	2	.000
(Germany) Bayer Giants Leverkusen	1	0	1	.000
(China) Bayi Rockets	1	0	1	.000
(China) Beijing Ducks	1	0	1	.000
(Spain) Bilbao Basket	1	0	1	.000
(Australia) Brisbane Bullets	1	0	1	.000
(Australia) Cairns Taipans	2	0	2	.000
China	2	0	2	.000
(Russia) CSKA Moscow	9	3	6	.333
(Spain) Estudiantes	1	0	1	.000
(Spain) FC Barcelona	8	3	5	.375
(Turkey) Fenerbahçe	5	2	3	.400
(Brazil) Flamengo	6	0	6	.000
(Brazil) Franca	1	0	1	.000
(Germany) Göttingen	2	0	2	.000
(China) Guangzhou Long-Lions	7	0	7	.000
(Germany) Hagen	1	0	1	.000
(Israel) Hapoel Jerusalem	1	0	1	.000
(Israel) Hapoel Tel Aviv	2	0	2	.000
(Spain) Joventut Badalona	2	0	2	.000
(Russia) Khimki	1	0	1	.000
(France) Limoges	1	0	1	.000
(United Kingdom) London Lions	1	0	1	.000
(Israel) Maccabi Haifa	21	0	21	.000
(Israel) Maccabi Ra'anana	6	0	6	.000
(Israel) Maccabi Tel Aviv	20	4	16	.200
(Spain) Málaga	1	1	0	1.000
(Australia) Melbourne United	5	0	5	.000
(Italy) Mens Sana	2	0	2	.000
New Zealand Breakers	5	0	5	.000
(Italy) Olimpia Milano	6	0	6	.000
(Greece) Olympiacos	3	0	3	.000
(Greece) Panathinaikos	3	0	3	.000
(Serbia) Partizan	2	0	2	.000
(Australia) Perth Wildcats	3	0	3	.000
(Philippines) Philippine Basketball Association	1	0	1	.000
(France) PSG Racing	1	0	1	.000
(Spain) Real Madrid	9	3	6	.333
(Lithuania) Rytas	1	0	1	.000
(Argentina) San Lorenzo	2	0	2	.000
(China) Shanghai Sharks	5	0	5	.000
Soviet Union	4	1	3	.250
(Australia) South East Melbourne Phoenix	1	0	1	.000
(Croatia) Split	2	0	2	.000
(Australia) Sydney Kings	2	0	2	.000
(Italy) Treviso	2	0	2	.000
(Italy) Varese	3	0	3	.000
(Brazil) Vasco da Gama	1	0	1	.000
(Switzerland) Vevey	1	0	1	.000
(Italy) Victoria Libertas	1	0	1	.000
(Italy) Virtus Bologna	5	0	5	.000
(Italy) Virtus Roma	2	0	2	.000
(Socialist Federal Republic of Yugoslavia) Yugoslavia	1	0	1	.000
(Lithuania) Žalgiris	3	0	3	.000
Totals	188	19	169	.101

=== By countries (international teams) ===
Team	GP	W	L	Pct
Argentina	2	0	2	.000
Australia	18	1	17	.056
Brazil	10	0	10	.000
China	16	0	16	.000
SR Croatia (Yugoslavia)	2	0	2	.000
France	2	0	2	.000
Germany	6	1	5	.167
Greece	6	0	6	.000
Great Britain	1	0	1	.000
Israel	50	4	46	.080
Italy	21	0	21	.000
Lithuania	4	0	4	.000
New Zealand	5	0	5	.000
Philippines	1	0	1	.000
Russia	10	3	7	.300
Serbia	2	0	2	.000
Soviet Union	4	1	3	.000
Spain	25	7	18	.280
Switzerland	1	0	1	.000
Turkey	8	2	6	.250
Yugoslavia	1	0	1	.000
Totals	188	19	169	.101

== See also ==
- NBA Global Games
- NBA Canada Series
- NBA versus EuroLeague games
- McDonald's Championship
- EuroLeague American Tour
- Naismith Cup
- NBA records
