= NBA Global Games =

NBA basketball games outside the USA and Canada

The NBA Global Games are a series of games featuring NBA teams that are played outside the United States and Canada. Its purpose is to bring teams from the National Basketball Association (NBA) to play games against either another NBA team or a foreign club.

The games themselves are played under NBA rules, which differ slightly from the FIBA rules under which the foreign teams normally play. Court markings and dimensions also differ slightly.

== History ==
The first official overseas game featuring an NBA team was an exhibition matchup between the Washington Bullets and Maccabi Tel Aviv on September 7, 1978. The then-defending champions lost 98–97 at the Yad Eliyahu Arena in Tel Aviv, Israel. The Bullets would play three more exhibition games the following year in Beijing and Shanghai in China, and in Quezon City in the Philippines.

In 1984, a series of exhibition matches pitting the New Jersey Nets, Phoenix Suns and Seattle SuperSonics against local European clubs were held in Israel, Italy, West Germany and Switzerland. Then in 1988, the Atlanta Hawks played against the Soviet Union national basketball team in a three-game series in Tbilisi, Vilnius and Moscow, becoming the first NBA team to play in the Soviet Union.

In 1987, the McDonald's Championship was introduced. While the first edition was held in Milwaukee, the following editions of the event were held in Europe, with the NBA teams emerging victorious against their European counterparts in each staging. The McDonald's Championship was discontinued in 1999.

The first regular season NBA games outside North America were held in Tokyo, Japan in 1990, with the Phoenix Suns and the Utah Jazz splitting the two-game series. Since then four other editions of the NBA Japan Games were held, with the last games being played in Saitama in 2003.

In 1991, the Miami Heat and the Washington Bullets played a preseason game in Nassau, Bahamas, marking the first NBA preseason game in the Caribbean. The following year, the Houston Rockets and the Dallas Mavericks played a preseason game in Mexico City, in the first NBA game held in Latin America. Several other preseason matches would follow in the Dominican Republic and Puerto Rico (under the name NBA Challenge - the Seattle SuperSonics won the NBA Challenge tournament in 1994 and the Dallas Mavericks won in 1996), but it was not until 1997 that the NBA decided to hold its first regular season game in Latin America, featuring the Mavericks and the Rockets in Mexico City.

While the NBA has had a history of sending teams to Europe to play against the local clubs, it was not until 1993 that the league decided to send two of its teams to Europe to play a pair of preseason matches against each other. An exhibition series between the Orlando Magic and the Atlanta Hawks was held in London, United Kingdom, a precursor of what would later be called the NBA Europe Live Tour. Further games were held in Italy, France, Germany, Russia, Spain and Turkey. It was not until 2011, however, that a regular season matchup was first played in Europe. The first regular season games in London pitted the New Jersey Nets against the Toronto Raptors, with the Nets sweeping the two-game series.

In 2004, the NBA held a pair of preseason games in Shanghai and Beijing, as part of the NBA China Games. The two-game series between the Sacramento Kings and the Houston Rockets also marked the homecoming of sorts for Yao Ming, who as the top overall pick of the 2002 NBA draft and a perennial all-star, helped popularize the NBA in China. The China Games eventually became a regular in the NBA's preseason schedule.

In 2013, the NBA decided to unify its overseas tours under one banner: the "NBA Global Games". The newly renamed event witnessed the first NBA preseason game held in Southeast Asia, with the Indiana Pacers and the Houston Rockets facing each other in the Philippines. In addition, a preseason game between the Washington Wizards and the Chicago Bulls in Brazil marked the first NBA preseason match in South America. The league was scheduled to hold a pair of regular season matches in Mexico and United Kingdom, but the game in Mexico City between the San Antonio Spurs and the Minnesota Timberwolves on December 4 never started due to a generator malfunction inside the Mexico City Arena, and was postponed to April 8, 2014, at the Target Center in Minneapolis.

The 2014 NBA Global Games began in October with two San Antonio Spurs friendlies versus EuroLeague teams Alba Berlin and Fenerbahçe Ülker at Berlin and Istanbul respectively. The Cleveland Cavaliers and Miami Heat played a preseason game at the HSBC Arena in Rio de Janeiro. Then the Brooklyn Nets and Sacramento Kings played two matches at the Mercedes-Benz Arena in Shanghai and the MasterCard Center in Beijing. Like the previous season, two regular season Global Games were scheduled in Mexico City and London; the Mexico City game between the Timberwolves and the Rockets on November 12 was played without incident.

For the 2015–16 season, the NBA scheduled two regular season games to be played outside the United States and Canada. The first game, between the Boston Celtics and the Sacramento Kings, was scheduled to be played on December 3, 2015, at the Mexico City Arena; the Celtics defeated the Kings 114–97. It marked the NBA's third regular-season game in Mexico City. The second game, between the Orlando Magic and the Toronto Raptors, was played on January 14, 2016, at The O_{2} Arena in London. It marked the NBA's sixth regular-season game in London.

In October 2019, the games in China were met with backlash following Houston Rockets general manager Daryl Morey's support of the 2019–2020 Hong Kong protests over the proposed extradition bill, which Hong Kongers feared would allow mainland Chinese officials to detain them despite Hong Kong's autonomy. The Chinese Basketball Association's suspended of its relationship with the Rockets and all Houston Rockets-related items were removed from the Tmall and JD.com sites and the team's games were removed from broadcasting on Tencent. Several days later, Morey and the NBA each issued a separate statement addressing the original tweet, with Morey saying that he never intended his tweet to cause any offense and the NBA saying that it was regrettable, which resulted in backlash from American politicians who called it "a betrayal of fundamental American values". Further fallout from the tweet included the decision by China Central Television to cancel the broadcasting of two NBA preseason games, pro-Hong Kong protest demonstrations held at preseason games in the United States involving teams from the Chinese Basketball Association, the cancellation of NBA Cares community events in Shanghai, criticism by then-president Donald Trump of the perceived double standards by the reactions of specific coaches to NBA response relative to their past criticisms of his policies, and the suspension/termination of all mainland Chinese sponsors of the NBA. The NBA eventually returned to China in 2025 after signing a five year deal to play two preseason games at Venetian Arena in Macau.

Following years of hiatus due to the COVID-19 pandemic, the NBA Global Games returned for the 2022–23 season with two regular season matchups. The NBA Mexico City Game 2022 saw the Heat face the Spurs on December 17, 2022, at the Mexico City Arena in Mexico City. The NBA Paris Game 2023 featured a matchup between the Chicago Bulls and the Detroit Pistons on January 19, 2023, at the Accor Arena in Paris.

In November 2021, the NBA and the United Arab Emirates signed a multiyear partnership agreement. The NBA made its first trip to Abu Dhabi for two preseason games between the Atlanta Hawks and the Milwaukee Bucks in October 2022. The second time two preseason games between the Dallas Mavericks and the Minnesota Timberwolves were held, in October 2023. The NBA returned to the Etihad Arena third time for two preseason games between the Denver Nuggets and the Boston Celtics, held on October 4 and 6, 2024. The league faced criticism from rights groups, with the Human Rights Watch accusing the NBA of helping the United Arab Emirates in "sportswashing" its poor human rights record. On September 30, 2024, HRW sent a letter to the NBA, asking it to ensure that the preseason games do not become a distraction, alleging the United Arab Emirates of using major sporting events to polish its image. A group of human rights organizations also called for the NBA to cancel the Abu Dhabi games, citing the country's involvement in the ongoing Sudan crisis. The planned 2026 Abu Dhabi preseason games and a potential preseason game in Doha as part of the lead up to the 2027 FIBA World Cup were cancelled due to the outbreak of the 2026 Iran war, however the league plans to return to the region when possible.

== List of preseason games ==
September 11, 1984

Phoenix Suns	148–121	New Jersey Nets

(Italy) Palazzo dello Sport di San Siro, Milan

October 20, 1991

Miami Heat	109–98	Washington Bullets

(The Bahamas) Carnival's Crystal Palace Resort, Nassau

October 27, 1992

Houston Rockets	104–102	Dallas Mavericks

Palacio de los Deportes, Mexico City

October 24, 1993

New York Knicks	103–93	Houston Rockets

Palacio de los Deportes, Mexico City

October 30, 1993

Miami Heat	109–103	Denver Nuggets

Coliseo de Puerto Rico, San Juan

October 30, 1993

Orlando Magic	120–95	Atlanta Hawks

(United Kingdom) London Arena, London

October 31, 1993

Atlanta Hawks	113–101	Orlando Magic

(United Kingdom) London Arena, London

October 18, 1994

Golden State Warriors	132–116	Charlotte Hornets

(France) Palais Omnisports de Paris-Bercy, Paris

October 21, 1994

Miami Heat	104–99	Atlanta Hawks

Coliseo de Puerto Rico, San Juan

October 23, 1994

Atlanta Hawks	103–99	Miami Heat

Coliseo de Puerto Rico, San Juan

October 28, 1994

San Antonio Spurs	121–112	Houston Rockets

Palacio de los Deportes, Mexico City

October 28, 1994

Seattle SuperSonics	133–105	Los Angeles Clippers

Palacio de los Deportes, Mexico City

October 29, 1994

Seattle SuperSonics	124–95	San Antonio Spurs

Palacio de los Deportes, Mexico City

October 29, 1994

Houston Rockets	111–103	Los Angeles Clippers

Palacio de los Deportes, Mexico City

October 28, 1995

San Antonio Spurs	125–107	Washington Bullets

Palacio de los Deportes, Mexico City

October 29, 1995

Detroit Pistons	110–99	Washington Bullets

Palacio de los Deportes, Mexico City

October 18, 1996

Indiana Pacers	98–95	Seattle SuperSonics

(Germany) Deutschlandhalle, Berlin

October 20, 1996

Seattle SuperSonics	82–72	Indiana Pacers

(Spain) Palacio Municipal de Deportes San Pablo, Seville

October 26, 1996

Cleveland Cavaliers	104–92	Phoenix Suns

Palacio de los Deportes, Mexico City

October 26, 1996

Dallas Mavericks	107–102	Utah Jazz

Palacio de los Deportes, Mexico City

October 27, 1996

Utah Jazz	111–105	Phoenix Suns

Palacio de los Deportes, Mexico City

October 27, 1996

Dallas Mavericks	88–86	Cleveland Cavaliers

Palacio de los Deportes, Mexico City

October 24, 1999

Golden State Warriors	117–91	New Jersey Nets

Palacio de los Deportes, Mexico City

October 14, 2000

Philadelphia 76ers	84–80	Washington Wizards

Palacio de los Deportes, Mexico City

October 11, 2002

Box score

Miami Heat	85–90	Minnesota Timberwolves

(Dominican Republic) Palacio de los Deportes Virgilio Travieso Soto, Santo Domingo

October 5, 2003

Box score

Dallas Mavericks	85–90	Utah Jazz

Palacio de los Deportes, Mexico City

October 7, 2003

Box score

Philadelphia 76ers	79–86 (OT)	Miami Heat

(Puerto Rico) Roberto Clemente Coliseum, San Juan

October 8, 2003

Box score

Memphis Grizzlies	93–105	San Antonio Spurs

(France) Palais Omnisports de Paris-Bercy, Paris

October 14, 2004

Box score

Sacramento Kings	86–88	Houston Rockets

(China) Shanghai Indoor Stadium, Shanghai

October 17, 2004

Box score

Houston Rockets	89–91	Sacramento Kings

(China) Capital Stadium, Beijing

October 14, 2005

Box score

Memphis Grizzlies	101–91	Miami Heat

Coliseo de Puerto Rico Jose Miguel Agrelot, San Juan

October 10, 2006

Box score

Philadelphia 76ers	103–100	Phoenix Suns

(Germany) Kölnarena, Cologne

October 10, 2006

Box score

Detroit Pistons	84–64	Miami Heat

Coliseo de Puerto Rico Jose Miguel Agrelot, San Juan

October 14, 2006

Box score

Golden State Warriors	121–115	Denver Nuggets

(Mexico) Arena Monterrey, Monterrey

October 6, 2007

Box score

Toronto Raptors	85–89	Boston Celtics

(Italy) PalaLottomatica, Rome

October 10, 2007

Box score

Boston Celtics	92–81	Minnesota Timberwolves

(United Kingdom) The O_{2} Arena, London

October 17, 2007

Box score

Orlando Magic	90–86	Cleveland Cavaliers

(China) Qizhong Forest Sports City Arena, Shanghai

October 20, 2007

Box score

Cleveland Cavaliers	84–100	Orlando Magic

Cotai Arena, Macau

October 9, 2008

Box score

New Jersey Nets	100–98 (OT)	Miami Heat

(France) Palais Omnisports de Paris-Bercy, Paris

October 12, 2008

Box score

Miami Heat	92–94	New Jersey Nets

(United Kingdom) The O_{2} Arena, London

October 14, 2008

Box score

Washington Wizards	80–96	New Orleans Hornets

(Germany) O_{2} World, Berlin

October 15, 2008

Report

Golden State Warriors	94–98	Milwaukee Bucks

(China) Guangzhou Gymnasium, Guangzhou

October 17, 2008

Report

Milwaukee Bucks	108–109	Golden State Warriors

(China) Beijing Olympic Basketball Arena, Beijing

October 17, 2008

Box Score

New Orleans Hornets	102–80	Washington Wizards

(Spain) Palau Sant Jordi, Barcelona

October 6, 2009

Box score

Utah Jazz	101–102	Chicago Bulls

(United Kingdom) The O_{2} Arena, London

October 8, 2009

Box score

Denver Nuggets	104–126	Indiana Pacers

(Taiwan) Taipei Arena, Taipei

October 11, 2009

Box score

Indiana Pacers	112–128	Denver Nuggets

(China) Wukesong Arena, Beijing

October 18, 2009

Box score

Philadelphia 76ers	116–94	Phoenix Suns

(Mexico) Arena Monterrey, Monterrey

October 4, 2010

Box score

Los Angeles Lakers	92–111	Minnesota Timberwolves

(United Kingdom) The O_{2} Arena, London

October 6, 2010

Box score

New York Knicks	100–106	Minnesota Timberwolves

(France) Palais Omnisports de Paris-Bercy, Paris

October 12, 2010

Box score

San Antonio Spurs	100–99	Los Angeles Clippers

Palacio de los Deportes, Mexico City

October 13, 2010

Box score

New Jersey Nets	81–91	Houston Rockets

(China) Wukesong Arena, Beijing

October 16, 2010

Box score

Houston Rockets	95–85	New Jersey Nets

(China) Guangzhou Gymnasium, Guangzhou

October 7, 2012

Box score

Orlando Magic	80–85	New Orleans Hornets

Mexico City Arena, Mexico City

October 11, 2012

Box score

Miami Heat	94–80	Los Angeles Clippers

(China) MasterCard Center, Beijing

October 14, 2012

Miami Heat	89–99	Los Angeles Clippers

(China) Mercedes-Benz Arena, Shanghai

October 8, 2013

Box score

Oklahoma City Thunder	103–99	Philadelphia 76ers

(United Kingdom) Phones 4u Arena, Manchester

October 10, 2013

Box score

Houston Rockets	116–96	Indiana Pacers

(Philippines) Mall of Asia Arena, Manila

October 12, 2013

Box score

Chicago Bulls	116–81	Washington Wizards

(Brazil) HSBC Arena, Rio de Janeiro

October 13, 2013

Box score

Indiana Pacers	98–107	Houston Rockets

(Taiwan) Taipei Arena, Taipei

October 15, 2013

Box score

Golden State Warriors	100–95	Los Angeles Lakers

(China) MasterCard Center, Beijing

October 18, 2013

Box score

Los Angeles Lakers	89–115	Golden State Warriors

(China) Mercedes-Benz Arena, Shanghai

October 11, 2014

Cleveland Cavaliers	122–119 (OT)	Miami Heat

(Brazil) HSBC Arena, Rio de Janeiro

October 12, 2014

Box score

Brooklyn Nets	97–95	Sacramento Kings

(China) Mercedes-Benz Arena, Shanghai

October 15, 2014

Box score

Sacramento Kings	117–129 (OT)	Brooklyn Nets

(China) MasterCard Center, Beijing

October 11, 2015

Box score

Los Angeles Clippers	94–106	Charlotte Hornets

(China) Shenzhen Universiade Sports Centre, Shenzhen

October 14, 2015

Box score

Charlotte Hornets	113–71	Los Angeles Clippers

(China) Mercedes-Benz Arena, Shanghai

October 9, 2016

Box score

New Orleans Pelicans	117–123	Houston Rockets

(China) Mercedes-Benz Arena, Shanghai

October 12, 2016

Box score

Houston Rockets	116–104	New Orleans Pelicans

(China) LeSports Center, Beijing

October 5, 2017

Box score

Minnesota Timberwolves	111–97	Golden State Warriors

(China) Shenzhen Universiade Sports Centre, Shenzhen

October 8, 2017

Box score

Minnesota Timberwolves	110–142	Golden State Warriors

(China) Mercedes-Benz Arena, Shanghai

October 5, 2018

Box score

Philadelphia 76ers	120–114	Dallas Mavericks

(China) Mercedes-Benz Arena, Shanghai

October 8, 2018

Box score

Dallas Mavericks	115–112	Philadelphia 76ers

(China) Shenzhen Universiade Sports Centre, Shenzhen

October 4, 2019

Boxscore

Sacramento Kings	131–132 (OT)	Indiana Pacers

(India) Sardar Vallabhbhai Patel Indoor Stadium, Mumbai

October 5, 2019

Boxscore

Indiana Pacers	130–106	Sacramento Kings

(India) Sardar Vallabhbhai Patel Indoor Stadium, Mumbai

October 8, 2019

Boxscore

Houston Rockets	129–134	Toronto Raptors

(Japan) Saitama Super Arena, Saitama

October 10, 2019

Boxscore

Toronto Raptors	111–118	Houston Rockets

(Japan) Saitama Super Arena, Saitama

October 10, 2019

Boxscore

Los Angeles Lakers	111–114	Brooklyn Nets

(China) Mercedes-Benz Arena, Shanghai

October 12, 2019

Boxscore

Brooklyn Nets	91–77	Los Angeles Lakers

(China) Shenzhen Universiade Sports Centre, Shenzhen

September 30, 2022

Boxscore

Golden State Warriors	96–87	Washington Wizards

(Japan) Saitama Super Arena, Saitama

October 2, 2022

Boxscore

Washington Wizards	95–104	Golden State Warriors

(Japan) Saitama Super Arena, Saitama

October 6, 2022

Boxscore

Milwaukee Bucks	113–123	Atlanta Hawks

(United Arab Emirates) Etihad Arena, Abu Dhabi

October 8, 2022

Boxscore

Atlanta Hawks	118–109	Milwaukee Bucks

(United Arab Emirates) Etihad Arena, Abu Dhabi

October 5, 2023

Boxscore

Dallas Mavericks	99–111	Minnesota Timberwolves

(United Arab Emirates) Etihad Arena, Abu Dhabi

October 7, 2023

Boxscore

Minnesota Timberwolves	104–96	Dallas Mavericks

(United Arab Emirates) Etihad Arena, Abu Dhabi

October 4, 2024

Boxscore

Boston Celtics	107–103	Denver Nuggets

(United Arab Emirates) Etihad Arena, Abu Dhabi

October 6, 2024

Boxscore

Denver Nuggets	104–130	Boston Celtics

(United Arab Emirates) Etihad Arena, Abu Dhabi

October 2, 2025

Boxscore

Philadelphia 76ers	84–99	New York Knicks

(United Arab Emirates) Etihad Arena, Abu Dhabi

October 4, 2025

Boxscore

New York Knicks	113–104	Philadelphia 76ers

(United Arab Emirates) Etihad Arena, Abu Dhabi

October 4, 2025

Boxscore

Orlando Magic	126–118	Miami Heat

Coliseo de Puerto Rico Jose Miguel Agrelot, San Juan

October 10, 2025

Boxscore

Phoenix Suns	132–127 (OT)	Brooklyn Nets

Venetian Arena, Macau

October 12, 2025

Boxscore

Brooklyn Nets	111–109	Phoenix Suns

Venetian Arena, Macau

October 9, 2026

Boxscore

Houston Rockets	135–117	Dallas Mavericks

Venetian Arena, Macau

October 11, 2026

Boxscore

Dallas Mavericks	132–115	Houston Rockets

Venetian Arena, Macau

== List of regular season games ==
November 2, 1990

Report

Phoenix Suns	119–96	Utah Jazz

(Japan) Tokyo Metropolitan Gymnasium, Tokyo

November 3, 1990

Report

Utah Jazz	102–101	Phoenix Suns

(Japan) Tokyo Metropolitan Gymnasium, Tokyo

November 6, 1992

Report

Seattle SuperSonics	111–94	Houston Rockets

(Japan) Yokohama Arena, Yokohama

November 7, 1992

Report

Houston Rockets	85–89	Seattle SuperSonics

(Japan) Yokohama Arena, Yokohama

November 4, 1994

Portland Trail Blazers	121–100	Los Angeles Clippers

(Japan) Yokohama Arena, Yokohama

November 5, 1994

Report

Los Angeles Clippers	95–112	Portland Trail Blazers

(Japan) Yokohama Arena, Yokohama

November 7, 1996

Box score

Orlando Magic	108–95	New Jersey Nets

(Japan) Tokyo Dome, Tokyo

November 9, 1996

Box score

New Jersey Nets	82–86	Orlando Magic

(Japan) Tokyo Dome, Tokyo

December 7, 1997

Report

Houston Rockets	108–106	Dallas Mavericks

Palacio de los Deportes, Mexico City

November 6, 1999

Box score

Minnesota Timberwolves	95–100	Sacramento Kings

(Japan) Tokyo Dome, Tokyo

November 7, 1999

Box score

Sacramento Kings	101–114	Minnesota Timberwolves

(Japan) Tokyo Dome, Tokyo

October 30, 2003

Box score

Los Angeles Clippers	100–109	Seattle SuperSonics

(Japan) Saitama Super Arena, Saitama

November 1, 2003

Box score

Seattle SuperSonics	124–105	Los Angeles Clippers

(Japan) Saitama Super Arena, Saitama

March 4, 2011

Box score

Toronto Raptors	103–116	New Jersey Nets

(United Kingdom) The O_{2} Arena, London

March 5, 2011

Box score

Toronto Raptors	136–137	New Jersey Nets

(United Kingdom) The O_{2} Arena, London

January 17, 2013

Box score

New York Knicks	102–87	Detroit Pistons

(United Kingdom) The O_{2} Arena, London

January 16, 2014

Box score

Brooklyn Nets	127–110	Atlanta Hawks

(United Kingdom) The O_{2} Arena, London

November 12, 2014

Box score

Houston Rockets	113–101	Minnesota Timberwolves

Mexico City Arena, Mexico City

January 15, 2015

Box score

New York Knicks	79–95	Milwaukee Bucks

(United Kingdom) The O_{2} Arena, London

December 3, 2015

Box score

Boston Celtics	114–97	Sacramento Kings

Mexico City Arena, Mexico City

January 14, 2016

Box score

Toronto Raptors	106–103	Orlando Magic

(United Kingdom) The O_{2} Arena, London

January 12, 2017

Box score

Indiana Pacers	112–140	Denver Nuggets

(United Kingdom) The O_{2} Arena, London

January 12, 2017

Box score

Dallas Mavericks	113–108	Phoenix Suns

Mexico City Arena, Mexico City

January 14, 2017

Box score

San Antonio Spurs	105–108	Phoenix Suns

Mexico City Arena, Mexico City

December 7, 2017

Box score

Oklahoma City Thunder	95–100	Brooklyn Nets

Mexico City Arena, Mexico City

December 9, 2017

Box score

Miami Heat	101–89	Brooklyn Nets

Mexico City Arena, Mexico City

January 11, 2018

Box score

Boston Celtics	114–103	Philadelphia 76ers

(United Kingdom) The O_{2} Arena, London

December 13, 2018

Box score

Chicago Bulls	91–97	Orlando Magic

Mexico City Arena, Mexico City

December 15, 2018

Box score

Utah Jazz	89–96	Orlando Magic

Mexico City Arena, Mexico City

January 17, 2019

Box score

New York Knicks	100–101	Washington Wizards

(United Kingdom) The O_{2} Arena, London

December 12, 2019

Box score

Dallas Mavericks	122–111	Detroit Pistons

Mexico City Arena, Mexico City

December 14, 2019

Box score

San Antonio Spurs	121–119 (OT)	Phoenix Suns

Mexico City Arena, Mexico City

January 24, 2020

Box score

Milwaukee Bucks	116–103	Charlotte Hornets

(France) AccorHotels Arena, Paris

December 17, 2022

Box score

Miami Heat	111–101	San Antonio Spurs

Mexico City Arena, Mexico City

January 19, 2023

Box score

Chicago Bulls	126–108	Detroit Pistons

(France) Accor Arena, Paris

November 9, 2023

Box score

Orlando Magic	119–120	Atlanta Hawks

Mexico City Arena, Mexico City

January 11, 2024

Box score

Brooklyn Nets	102–111	Cleveland Cavaliers

(France) Accor Arena, Paris

November 2, 2024

Box score

Miami Heat	118–98	Washington Wizards

Mexico City Arena, Mexico City

January 23, 2025

Box score

San Antonio Spurs	140–110	Indiana Pacers

(France) Accor Arena, Paris

January 25, 2025

Box score

Indiana Pacers	136–98	San Antonio Spurs

(France) Accor Arena, Paris

November 1, 2025

Box score

Dallas Mavericks	110–122	Detroit Pistons

Mexico City Arena, Mexico City

January 15, 2026

Box score

Memphis Grizzlies	111–118	Orlando Magic

(Germany) Uber Arena, Berlin

January 18, 2026

Box score

Orlando Magic	109–126	Memphis Grizzlies

(United Kingdom) The O_{2} Arena, London

November 7, 2026

Box score

Denver Nuggets	114–102	Indiana Pacers

Mexico City Arena, Mexico City

January 14, 2027

New Orleans Pelicans	vs.	San Antonio Spurs

(France) Accor Arena, Paris

January 17, 2027

San Antonio Spurs	vs.	New Orleans Pelicans

(United Kingdom) Co-op Live, Manchester

2028

TBD	vs.	TBD

(Germany) Uber Arena, Berlin

2028

TBD	vs.	TBD

(France) Accor Arena, Paris

== See also ==
- NBA Canada Series
- List of games played between NBA and international teams
- NBA versus EuroLeague games
- NBLxNBA
- McDonald's Championship
- EuroLeague American Tour
- Naismith Cup
