= Naismith Cup =

Annual NBA exhibition game

- Sport: Basketball
- Founded: 1995; 31 years ago
- Folded: 2005; 21 years ago
- Country: Canada
- Last champion: Maccabi Tel Aviv

The Naismith Cup was an annual pre-season National Basketball Association (NBA) exhibition game. From the 1995 season through 2000, it was played between the two Canadian NBA rivals, the Toronto Raptors and the Vancouver Grizzlies, at neutral venues across Canada. The cup was named after James Naismith, the Canadian inventor of basketball, and was originally created to raise money for Canada Basketball, similar to the Pearson Cup competition between Canada's Major League Baseball teams the Toronto Blue Jays and Montreal Expos (which have since relocated to Washington). Following the Grizzlies relocation to Memphis the cup was laid dead, though the Raptors continued the tradition of hosting neutral site pre-season games in Canadian cities under the NBA Canada Series name. The Raptors won the series against Vancouver 4–1.

Prior to the 2003 season, the cup was revived as an international match between the Raptors and a European team, played at the Air Canada Centre in Toronto. In 2003 the opponent was the Panathinaikos A.O. of Athens, Greece, while in 2004 the Benetton Treviso of Treviso, Italy visited Toronto. The final competition in 2005 saw the Raptors' only international loss, against Maccabi Tel Aviv of Tel Aviv, Israel. The current whereabouts of the Naismith Cup are unknown.

== Results ==
Season	Date	Location	Arena	Visiting team	Score	Home team	Attendance
Toronto–Vancouver series
1995	October 21	(Canada) Winnipeg	Winnipeg Arena	(Canada) Toronto Raptors	98–77	(Canada) Vancouver Grizzlies	11,203
1996	October 27	(Canada) Calgary	Canadian Airlines Saddledome	(Canada) Toronto Raptors	77–80	(Canada) Vancouver Grizzlies	15,104
1997	October 20	(Canada) Halifax	Halifax Metro Centre	(Canada) Vancouver Grizzlies	98–107	(Canada) Toronto Raptors	8,190
1998	October 19	(Canada) Vancouver	General Motors Place	Toronto Raptors @ Vancouver Grizzlies; Cancelled due to 1998–99 NBA lockout			
1999	October 18	(Canada) Edmonton	Skyreach Centre	(Canada) Toronto Raptors	110–84	(Canada) Vancouver Grizzlies	12,852
2000	October 12	(Canada) Ottawa	Corel Centre	(Canada) Vancouver Grizzlies	92–97	(Canada) Toronto Raptors	14,783
International series
2003	October 10	(Canada) Toronto	Air Canada Centre	(Greece) Panathinaikos	76–100	(Canada) Toronto Raptors	17,749
2004	October 20	(Canada) Toronto	Air Canada Centre	(Italy) Benetton Treviso	83–86	(Canada) Toronto Raptors	10,668
2005	October 16	(Canada) Toronto	Air Canada Centre	(Israel) Maccabi Elite Tel Aviv	105–103	(Canada) Toronto Raptors	17,281

== Other neutral site Raptors games and international opponents ==
In addition to the Naismith Cup games, the Raptors have played several other neutral site preseason games in Canadian cities. During their first two seasons of play (1995–1997), prior to the completion of construction on their new home the Air Canada Centre, the Raptors played three regular season games at Copps Coliseum in Hamilton, Ontario. The team also lost a preseason game to the Miami Heat 119–89 at Marine Midland Arena in nearby Buffalo, New York before 12,748 fans on 18 October 1996. A second game, against the New York Knicks, was scheduled for 15 October 1998 at the arena, but was cancelled due to the 1998–99 NBA lockout. The team has subsequently discussed the possibility of playing additional preseason and regular season games in Buffalo. The Buffalo Braves played a total of 16 regular season games at Maple Leaf Gardens in Toronto from 1971 to 1975. Blue Cross Arena in Rochester, New York hosted a Raptors pre-season 103-81 victory over the Cleveland Cavaliers in 2006 before 9,429 fans. More recently, the team has participated in a number of games as part of the NBA Canada Series.

Season	Date	Location	Arena	Visiting team	Score	Home team	Attendance	Ref
1995	October 14	Halifax, Nova Scotia	Halifax Metro Centre	Philadelphia 76ers	107–120	Toronto Raptors	9,367	
1995	October 16	Saint John, New Brunswick	Harbour Station	Philadelphia 76ers	121–93	Toronto Raptors	6,297	
1995	October 19	Saskatoon	Saskatchewan Place	Atlanta Hawks	106–105 (OT)	Toronto Raptors	5,648	
1996	October 11	Halifax, Nova Scotia	Halifax Metro Centre	Atlanta Hawks	100–82	Toronto Raptors	7,589	
1996	October 13	Ottawa	Corel Centre	New York Knicks	73–78	Toronto Raptors	9,662	
1997	October 24	Hamilton, Ontario	Copps Coliseum	Denver Nuggets	114–100	Toronto Raptors	10,962	
2003	October 23	St. John's, Newfoundland and Labrador	Mile One Stadium	Cleveland Cavaliers @ Toronto Raptors; Cancelled due to wet playing surface			7,500	
2004	October 17	London, Ontario	John Labatt Centre	Toronto Raptors	103–108	Philadelphia 76ers	7,619	
2005	October 24	Winnipeg	MTS Centre	Portland Trail Blazers	105–98	Toronto Raptors	10,900	
2008	October 21	Edmonton	Rexall Place	Denver Nuggets	105–94	Toronto Raptors	17,534	
2009	October 6	London, Ontario	John Labatt Centre	Toronto Raptors	98–107	Philadelphia 76ers	7,213	
2010	October 6	Vancouver	Rogers Arena	Toronto Raptors	129–78	Phoenix Suns	18,123	
2010	October 22	Montreal	Bell Centre	New York Knicks	103–108	Toronto Raptors	22,114	
2012	October 19	Montreal	Bell Centre	New York Knicks	88–107	Toronto Raptors	22,114	
2014	October 5	Vancouver	Rogers Arena	Sacramento Kings	94–99	Toronto Raptors	18,900	
2014	October 24	Montreal	Bell Centre	New York Knicks	80–83	Toronto Raptors	20,738	
2015	October 4	Vancouver	Rogers Arena	Los Angeles Clippers	73–93	Toronto Raptors	19,000	
2015	October 14	Ottawa	Canadian Tire Centre	Toronto Raptors	87–89	Minnesota Timberwolves	15,522	
2015	October 23	Montreal	Bell Centre	Washington Wizards	82–92	Toronto Raptors	20,072	
2016	October 1	Vancouver	Rogers Arena	Golden State Warriors	93–97	Toronto Raptors	19,000	
2016	October 3	Calgary	Scotiabank Saddledome	Denver Nuggets	108–106	Toronto Raptors	19,600	
2018	September 29	Vancouver	Rogers Arena	Portland Trail Blazers	104-122	Toronto Raptors	18,654	
2018	October 10	Montreal	Bell Centre	Brooklyn Nets	91-118	Toronto Raptors	20,526	
2022	October 2	Edmonton	Rogers Place	Utah Jazz	82-114	Toronto Raptors	17,100	
2022	October 14	Montreal	Bell Centre	Boston Celtics	134-137 (OT)	Toronto Raptors	21,900	
2023	October 8	Vancouver	Rogers Arena	Sacramento Kings	99-112	Toronto Raptors	18,654	
2024	October 6	Montreal	Bell Centre	Washington Wizards	98-125	Toronto Raptors	21,900	
2025	October 6	Vancouver	Rogers Arena	Denver Nuggets	112-108	Toronto Raptors	18,654	
2026	October 3	Quebec City	Videotron Centre	Miami Heat	129-105	Toronto Raptors	18,474	
2026	October 10	Vancouver	Rogers Arena	LA Clippers	106-114	Toronto Raptors	18,872	

Since the end of the Naismith Cup, the Raptors have continued to play international opponents. They hosted Maccabi Tel Aviv of Israel again in 2006, Žalgiris Kaunas of Lithuania in 2007, CSKA Moscow of Russia in 2008, Real Madrid of Spain in 2012, and Maccabi Haifa of Israel in 2014, and have played away games against Lottomatica Roma of Italy and Real Madrid of Spain in 2007. They hosted San Lorenzo de Almagro of Argentina during the 2016 preseason, and Melbourne United of Australia in 2018.

Toronto has also participated in NBA Global Games, playing a preseason game against the Boston Celtics in Rome, Italy in 2007, two regular season games against the New Jersey Nets in London, England in 2011, a regular season game in London against the Orlando Magic in 2016, and two preseason games against the Houston Rockets in Saitama, Japan in 2019.

== See also ==
- NBA Global Games
- NBA Canada Series
- List of games played between NBA and international teams
- NBA versus EuroLeague games
- McDonald's Championship
- EuroLeague American Tour
