= Dan MacKenzie =

Canadian sports administrator and marketing executive

- Born: Guelph, Ontario, Canada
- Education: BComm, B.Ed., MBM
- Alma mater: McMaster University; Brock University; George Brown College; Ohio University
- Occupations: Sports marketing and sport management
- Employer: Canadian Hockey League
- Known for: Vice-president and managing director of NBA Canada (2014–2019)

Dan MacKenzie is a Canadian sports administrator and marketing executive. He has served as president of the Canadian Hockey League since September 2019. He served as the vice-president and managing director of National Basketball Association (NBA) Canada from 2014 to 2019, and previously worked for The Sports Network. During his tenure with NBA Canada, he implemented marketing strategies targeted to younger demographics to grow the game in Canada, and he increased the NBA presence using television, advertising, social media and community involvement. He oversaw events which included managing the development NBA Global Games in Europe, 3x3 basketball tournaments in Canada, the NBA Canada Series, and the 2016 NBA All-Star Game.

== Early life and education ==
MacKenzie was born and raised in Guelph, Ontario, and is a former school teacher. He played ice hockey as a youth in Guelph, and attended Guelph Platers games.

He completed a Bachelor of Commerce degree in marketing at McMaster University in 1992, a Bachelor of Education degree at Brock University in 1995, the sport and event marketing program at George Brown College in 1997, and a Master of Management in sport at Ohio University in 2019.

== Canadian basketball ==
MacKenzie began working for National Basketball Association (NBA) Canada in 1998, managing events and development of basketball in Canada. From December 2002 to October 2003, he led an NBA project to host exhibition games in Europe as part of NBA Global Games. He worked for The Sports Network as the senior marketing manager from October 2003 to October 2004. He returned to NBA Canada in October 2004 as its director of marketing until September 2006. He was promoted to be NBA Canada's general manager in October 2006, and its managing director in January 2011. He was named vice-president and managing director of NBA Canada in January 2014, and serves in the same capacity as of August 2019.

Example of 3x3 basketball

MacKenzie brought in corporate partners to sponsor NBA events which included 3x3 basketball tournaments in Canada. By 2008, he had working relationships with partners Parmalat Canada, Speed Stick and the Wrigley Company, and aimed to promote basketball in Canada specifically to a young and diverse demographic. In 2013, Financial Post Business noted that NBA revenue in Canada grew 224% since 2008, and MacKenzie attributed the growth to marketing strategy combined with the sport's appeal to the young Asian Canadians demographic. He noted that recent trends of immigration to Canada showed people were coming from countries where basketball was already a popular sport. He also noted there was significant support from Filipino Canadians and Chinese Canadians, and felt it was related to the former Philippine Basketball League and NBA efforts in China including exhibition games, skills programs, and coaching programs. He also targeted first-generation Canadians as a market for basketball.

From 2010 to 2013, the growth rate for Canadians participating in basketball increased 16%. As of 2010, basketball was the most popular team sport in Canada from the ages of 12 and 17. MacKenzie attributed this to basketball being "easy and inexpensive to play, and a safe sport". He also noted that since the Toronto Raptors began play in 1995, "what you are seeing now with the growth of the sport, is the first generation of kids who have grown up with the NBA being a strong element in their lives".

MacKenzie aimed to increase apparel sales, social media presence and broadcasts for basketball in Canada. He stated that in 2013, Adidas basketball apparel sales had increased 103% in one year, and that the NBA was recognized by Mashable as one of the top-engaged brands on Twitter in 2013. He wanted to increase accessibility of NBA basketball games in Canada through cable television packages which included NBA League Pass to see Toronto Raptors and other out-of-town games. He stated that broadcast ratings grew approximately 19% in one year. As of 2013, fans could view up to 300 games per year on television. He used local events to engage new fans, which coincided with the NBA Canada Series beginning in 2012. He also wanted to ensure leaving a legacy in those communities, which including upgrades to local recreational and basketball facilities. In 2013, the NBA added a "Play Ball" section to its web site in English and French, to facilitate increased player registrations in youth clubs across Canada.

NBA statement on MacKenzie...

"Under Dan's leadership, basketball and the NBA's popularity in Canada have grown to all-time highs. Among Dan's many accomplishments, he oversaw the success of NBA All-Star 2016 in Toronto, the expansion of our Jr. NBA program, and most recently a record-setting season for the NBA in Canada."

— Mark Tatum, deputy commissioner, July 2019

In 2013, MacKenzie was part of Toronto's successful bid to host the 2016 NBA All-Star Game, and stated that "the time was right" to bring the event outside of the United States for the first time. He estimated that it would bring $80 million to $100 million into Toronto's economy. He also announced contracts with Air Miles and Bank of Montreal, and said that Canadian-based sponsors were coming onboard due to the growing fan base in Canada, highlighting that the NBA had 650,000 Canadian followers on Twitter by 2016.

In May 2019, MacKenzie stated the NBA had reached a peak in Canadian sponsorship to date, with 32 partners including Bell Canada, Molson Coors Brewing Company and the Ontario Lottery and Gaming Corporation. He also noted the increasing number of Canadians playing in the NBA in recent years. He said that during the playoff run leading Toronto's victory in the 2019 NBA Finals, the Canadian audience from outside of Ontario grew, viewership increased 163% and sales of NBA merchandise rose 26% from the previous season, and that basketball's popularity in Canada was at an all-time high. In June 2019, he announced a partnership with Canada Basketball to create a Junior NBA Leadership Council to promote programs offered to local youth community groups, and expanded television coverage of the Women's National Basketball Association to be available via Sportsnet, TSN and NBA TV Canada.

MacKenzie resigned effective August 15, 2019, and was succeeded by Leah MacNab.

== Canadian Hockey League ==
On July 30, 2019, the Canadian Hockey League (CHL) announced MacKenzie was hired as its first full-time president. CHL president David Branch said that, "Dan has a unique combination of league operations, sports marketing and business experience along with being a former school teacher. His experience will help the CHL continue to grow and expand our programs and player experience". MacKenzie has stated he looks forward to building on the relationships that CHL teams have with their communities. He took over in September 2019 from Branch, who had served as president since 1996.

The Memorial Cup trophy

In October 2019, MacKenzie stated it was a priority to grow the CHL's brand and build upon the experience for players and spectators, and to bring national events such as the Memorial Cup to smaller communities. He also stated the need to promote the CHL's scholarship program, which exceeds a $10-million investment each year for the future of players who have careers outside of hockey.

On October 16, 2019, MacKenzie announced Kubota as the title sponsor of the CHL/NHL Top Prospects Game beginning with the 2020 event. In November 2019, he announced that Wawanesa Insurance had partnered with the CHL for a Christmas Toy drive.

In March 2020, the CHL and its constituent leagues cancelled the remainder of the 2019–20 regular seasons, playoffs and the 2020 Memorial Cup, due to the COVID-19 pandemic in North America. MacKenzie stated a desire to begin the 2020–21 on its normal schedule, but would wait until public health authorities deem it is safe to play. He also stated no decision has been made to restart play without fans in attendance as proposed in some professional leagues.

When the CHL Top Prospects Game was replaced by the CHL USA Prospects Challenge involving the USA Hockey National Team Development Program in 2024, MacKenzie felt that the new event would "[serve] as a best-on-best showcase [to] provide our top draft-eligible players from across the CHL with a great opportunity to demonstrate their elite talent and world-class skill set as they work towards hearing their name called at the NHL draft".

== Personal life ==
MacKenzie resides in Guelph, Ontario, and is married with two children as of 2019. He became a volunteer board member for the Sponsorship Marketing Council of Canada (SMCC) in 2010, and was elected its new chairman in January 2013. He stepped down from the SMCC in 2015. He later volunteered for the board of directors of Licensing Industry Merchandiser's Association Canada, and has been a committee member for the sports celebrity festival hosted by Special Olympics Canada.

== Awards ==
MacKenzie was named one of the George Brown College alumni Five to Watch, and received the college's Alumni Achievement Award. He served as co-chairman of the Five to Watch event in 2013.
