= 2016 NBA All-Star Game =

Exhibition basketball game

| | 1 | 2 | 3 | 4 | Total |
|---|---|---|---|---|---|
| West | 40 | 52 | 53 | 51 | 196 |
| East | 43 | 47 | 46 | 37 | 173 |
- Date: February 14, 2016
- Arena: Air Canada Centre and Ricoh Coliseum
- City: Toronto
- MVP: Russell Westbrook (West)
- National anthem: Nelly Furtado (Canadian); Ne-Yo (American)
- Halftime show: Sting
- Attendance: 18,298
- Network: TSN and Sportsnet (Canada); TNT and TBS (United States)
- Announcers: Marv Albert, Reggie Miller, Chris Webber, Craig Sager, and David Aldridge; Kevin Harlan, Ernie Johnson, Reggie Miller, Kenny Smith, Charles Barkley, Shaquille O'Neal, and Kevin Hart (All-Star Saturday Night); Matt Winer, Grant Hill and Chris Webber (Rising Stars Challenge)

NBA All-Star Game
| < 2015 | 2017 > |

The 2016 NBA All-Star Game was an exhibition basketball game that was played on February 14, 2016, during the National Basketball Association's (NBA) 2015–16 season. It was the 65th edition of the NBA All-Star Game, and was played at Air Canada Centre in Toronto, home of the Toronto Raptors. The Western Conference defeated the Eastern Conference, 196–173. Russell Westbrook was named the All-Star Game Most Valuable Player. The Raptors were awarded the All-Star Game in an announcement on September 30, 2013. This was the first time that the NBA All-Star Game was held outside the United States. TSN and Sportsnet televised the game nationally in Canada, while TNT and TBS televised the game nationally in the United States. This was also the 18th and final All-Star Game in which Kobe Bryant participated, as a result of his retirement after the season.

== Background ==
Toronto's bid to host the 2016 NBA All-Star Game was led by NBA Canada vice-president and managing director Dan MacKenzie. It was the culmination of years of planning to grow basketball in Canada, and by 2013 he stated that "the time was right" to bring the event outside of the United States for the first time. He estimated that it would bring $80 million to $100 million into Toronto's economy. He also highlighted that the NBA had 650,000 Canadian followers on Twitter by 2016.

== All-Star Game ==
=== Coaches ===
Although the Golden State Warriors had the best record in the Western Conference, no coach may coach two consecutive All-Star Games, therefore making Steve Kerr ineligible. San Antonio Spurs head coach Gregg Popovich served as the Western Conference coach due to the Spurs having the second-best record in the West. The Cleveland Cavaliers had the best record in the Eastern Conference, but on January 22, the team fired head coach David Blatt and replaced him with Tyronn Lue. Lue was named the Eastern Conference head coach on January 27, even though he had only coached four games up to that point.

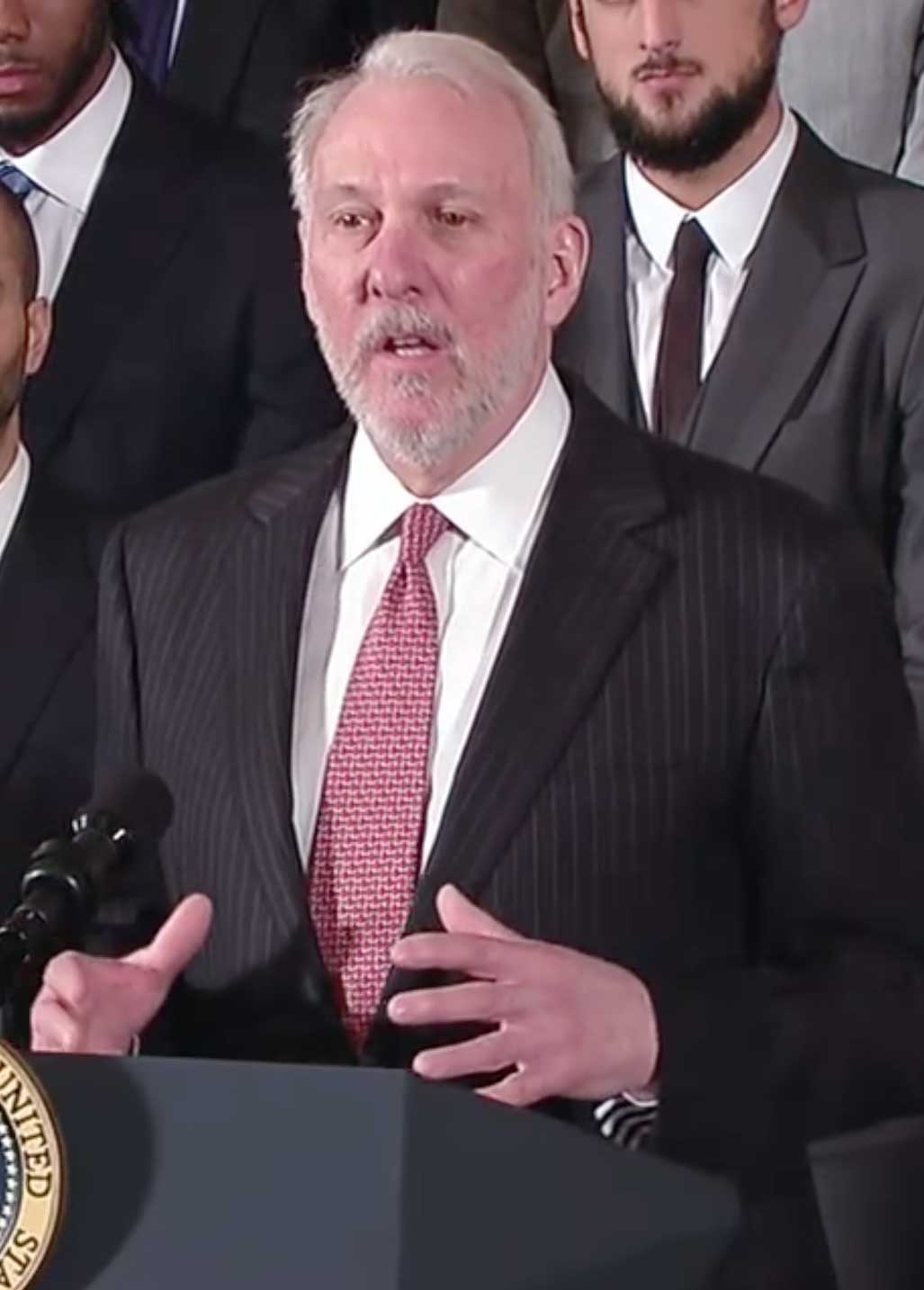
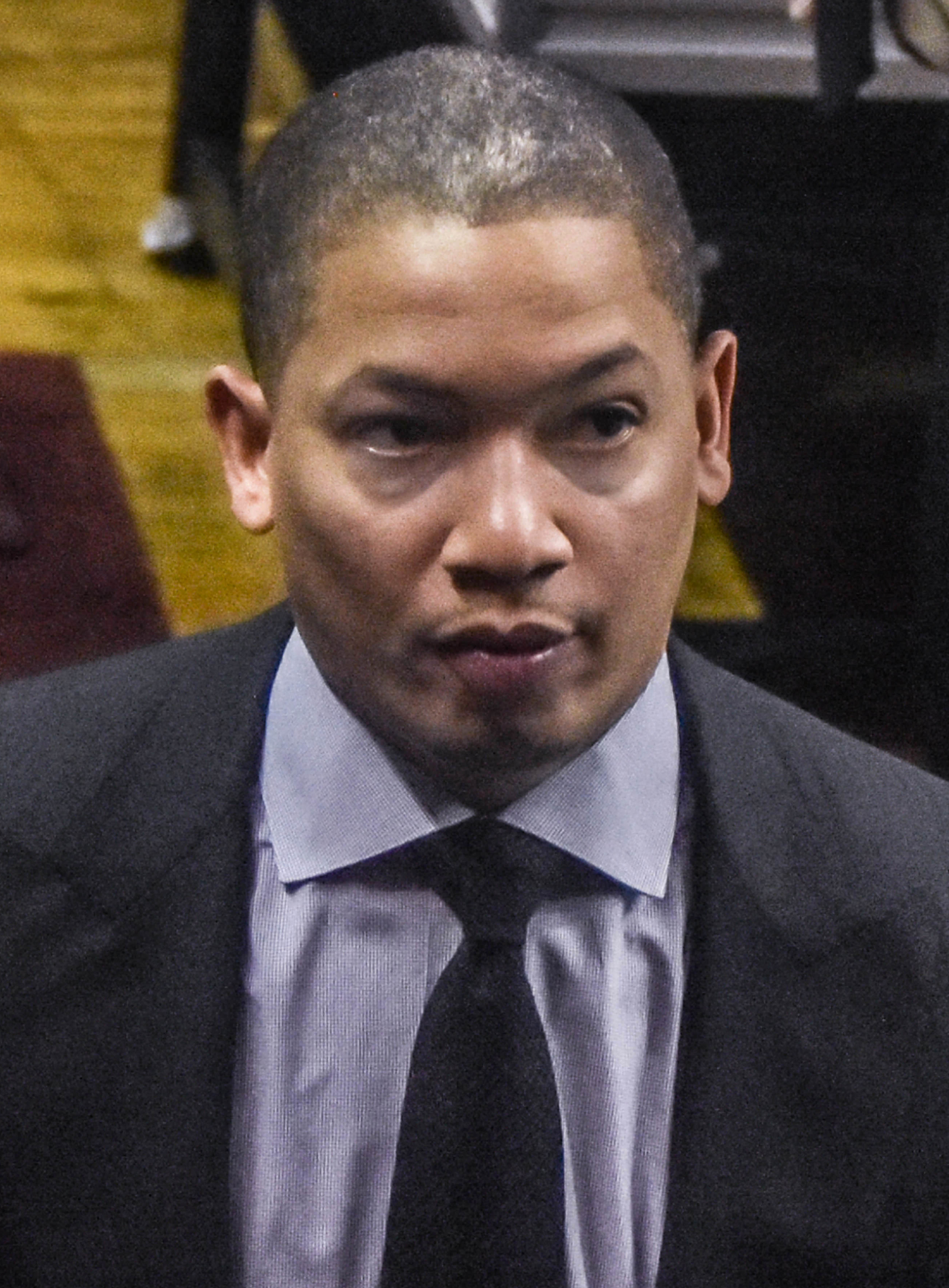
Gregg Popovich (left) and Tyronn Lue were selected as the West and East head coach, respectively.

=== Rosters ===
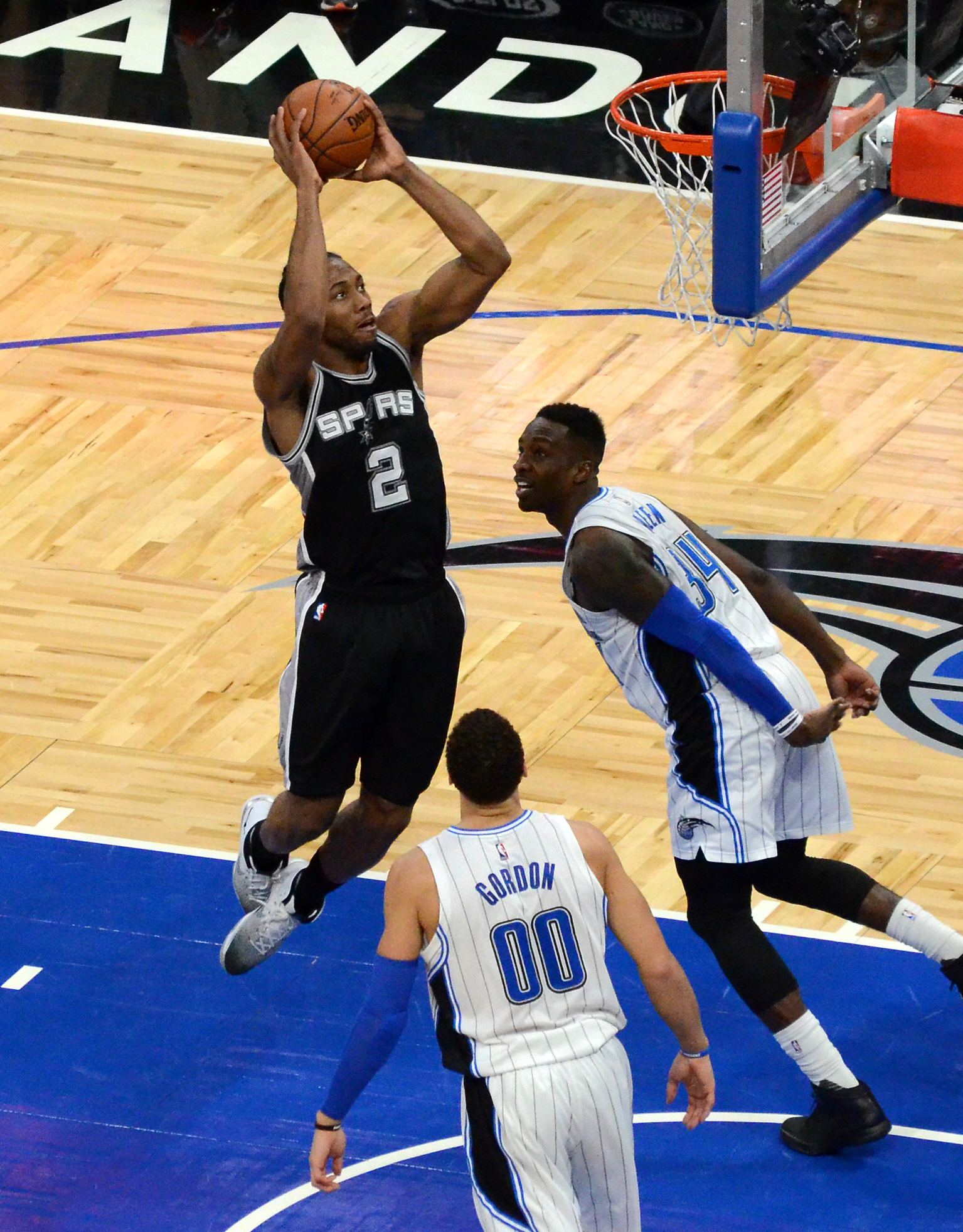
Kawhi Leonard was selected by fans as an All-Star starter for the first time.

The rosters for the All-Star Game were selected through a voting process. The starters are chosen by the fans. Two guards and three frontcourt players who received the highest vote are named the All-Star starters. NBA head coaches vote for the reserves for their respective conferences, none of which can be players on their own team. Each coach selects two guards, three frontcourt players and two wild cards, with each selected player ranked in order of preference within each category. If a multi-position player is to be selected, coaches are encouraged to vote for the player at the position that was "most advantageous for the All-Star team," regardless of where the player was listed on the All-Star ballot or the position he was listed in box scores.

Kobe Bryant of the Los Angeles Lakers topped the ballots this year with 1,891,614 votes, earning Bryant his 18th all-star appearance in his final season in the NBA, and also beating out the 2015 leading vote getter Stephen Curry of the Golden State Warriors, who was second this year in total votes with 1,604,325. This is the fourth time that Bryant has been the leading vote getter. The other players named to the Western Conference starting roster include Russell Westbrook and Kevin Durant of the Oklahoma City Thunder, named to their fifth and seventh All-Star Games respectively, and Kawhi Leonard of the San Antonio Spurs, who was named to his first career All-Star Game.

LeBron James of the Cleveland Cavaliers, with 1,089,206 votes, was the leading vote getter in the Eastern Conference, earning James his 12th career all-star nod. Dwyane Wade of the Miami Heat was also named a starter to his 12th career All-Star Game, with a total of 941,466 votes. Rounding out the rest of the Eastern Conference starting lineup was Kyle Lowry of the Toronto Raptors (second all-star nod), Paul George of the Indiana Pacers (3rd all-star nod), and Carmelo Anthony of the New York Knicks, who was named to his ninth career All-Star Game.

The West Reserves included Klay Thompson and Draymond Green of the Golden State Warriors, Chris Paul of the Los Angeles Clippers, James Harden of the Houston Rockets, Anthony Davis of the New Orleans Pelicans, DeMarcus Cousins of the Sacramento Kings, and LaMarcus Aldridge, who made the All-Star Game as a member of the San Antonio Spurs for the first time.

The East Reserves included John Wall of the Washington Wizards, DeMar DeRozan of the Toronto Raptors, Jimmy Butler of the Chicago Bulls, Isaiah Thomas of the Boston Celtics, Chris Bosh of the Miami Heat, Paul Millsap of the Atlanta Hawks, and Andre Drummond of the Detroit Pistons. Jimmy Butler and Chris Bosh ultimately had to sit out the All-Star Game due to a knee and calf injury, respectively. Pau Gasol of the Chicago Bulls and Al Horford of the Atlanta Hawks were named as Butler and Bosh's replacements.

Eastern Conference All-Stars
| Pos | Player | Team | No. of selections | Votes |
Starters
| G | Dwyane Wade | Miami Heat | 12 | 941,466 |
| G | Kyle Lowry | Toronto Raptors | 2 | 646,441 |
| F | LeBron James | Cleveland Cavaliers | 12 | 1,089,206 |
| F | Paul George | Indiana Pacers | 3 | 711,595 |
| F | Carmelo Anthony | New York Knicks | 9 | 567,348 |
Reserves
| G/F | Jimmy Butler^{INJ1} | Chicago Bulls | 2 | — |
| F/C | Chris Bosh^{INJ2} | Miami Heat | 11 | — |
| G | John Wall | Washington Wizards | 3 | — |
| F | Paul Millsap | Atlanta Hawks | 3 | — |
| G | DeMar DeRozan | Toronto Raptors | 2 | — |
| C | Andre Drummond | Detroit Pistons | 1 | — |
| G | Isaiah Thomas | Boston Celtics | 1 | — |
| F/C | Pau Gasol^{REP1} | Chicago Bulls | 6 | — |
| C/F | Al Horford^{REP2} | Atlanta Hawks | 4 | — |
Head coach: Tyronn Lue (Cleveland Cavaliers)

Western Conference All-Stars
| Pos | Player | Team | No. of selections | Votes |
Starters
| G | Stephen Curry | Golden State Warriors | 3 | 1,604,325 |
| G | Russell Westbrook | Oklahoma City Thunder | 5 | 772,009 |
| G | Kobe Bryant | Los Angeles Lakers | 18 | 1,891,614 |
| F | Kevin Durant | Oklahoma City Thunder | 7 | 980,787 |
| F | Kawhi Leonard | San Antonio Spurs | 1 | 782,339 |
Reserves
| G | Chris Paul | Los Angeles Clippers | 9 | — |
| F/C | LaMarcus Aldridge | San Antonio Spurs | 5 | — |
| G | James Harden | Houston Rockets | 4 | — |
| F/C | Anthony Davis | New Orleans Pelicans | 3 | — |
| C | DeMarcus Cousins | Sacramento Kings | 2 | — |
| G | Klay Thompson | Golden State Warriors | 2 | — |
| F | Draymond Green | Golden State Warriors | 1 | — |
Head coach: Gregg Popovich (San Antonio Spurs)

^INJ1 Jimmy Butler was unable to participate due to a knee injury.
^REP1 Pau Gasol was selected as Butler's replacement.
^INJ2 Chris Bosh was unable to participate due to a calf injury.
^REP2 Al Horford was selected as Bosh's replacement.

=== Game ===
TNT, TBS

February 14, 2016
8:30 pm ET

Box score

Western Conference 196, Eastern Conference 173
Scoring by quarter: 40–43, 52–47, 53–46, 51–37
| Pts: Russell Westbrook 31; Rebs: Russell Westbrook 8 Asts: Chris Paul 16 | Pts: Paul George 41; Rebs: Andre Drummond 13; Asts: Kyle Lowry 10 |

Air Canada Centre, Toronto, Ontario
Attendance: 18,298
Referees:
- Matt Boland
- Zach Zarba
- Danny Crawford

Russell Westbrook earned his second-straight MVP award in his first All-Star start as the West won 196–173 over the East. He scored a team-high 31 points and added eight rebounds, five assists, and five steals in 22 minutes. Kobe Bryant, who planned to retire after the season, had 10 points, six rebounds, and seven assists in his final All-Star Game. The 369 total points in the game broke the previous year's record by 48, and both sides exceeded the prior team record of 163.

Stephen Curry added 26 points for the West, and teammates Anthony Davis scored 24 on 12-of-13 shooting and Kevin Durant tallied 23. The East's Paul George scored 41, which tied Westbrook's total from 2015 and was one short of Wilt Chamberlain's record. LeBron James totaled 13 points for a career record of 291 to pass Bryant, who retired with 290.

Westbrook became the first black player in All-Star history to win consecutive MVPs outright. Bob Pettit is the other player to have won back-to-back awards, winning in 1958 and sharing it with Elgin Baylor in 1959. West players offered to feed Bryant the ball in an attempt to get him a record fifth All-Star MVP, but he declined.

== All-Star Weekend ==
=== Celebrity Game ===
The 2016 NBA Celebrity All-Star Game was played on February 12, 2016, at the Ricoh Coliseum in Toronto.

The game was a matchup of Team Canada vs. Team USA, coached by Canadian rapper Drake, and 4-time Celebrity Game MVP Kevin Hart, respectively. It featured 21 players, including actors Stephan James, Jason Sudeikis, Anthony Anderson, O'Shea Jackson, Jr., Joel David Moore, and Tom Cavanagh, and TV hosts Nick Cannon, Terrence Jenkins, and the Property Brothers. The game also included four NBA legends in Chauncey Billups, Muggsy Bogues, Tracy McGrady, and Rick Fox, as well as Elena Delle Donne and Tammy Sutton-Brown of the WNBA.

Despite the efforts of head coach Kevin Hart who later played in the game in the second half, Team Canada won 74–64 and Win Butler was named MVP of the game.

ESPN

February 12
7:00 pm ET

Recap

Team USA 64, Team Canada 74
Scoring by quarter: 15–20, 13–17, 18–16, 18–21

Ricoh Coliseum, Toronto

Team USA
| Player | Background |
|---|---|
| Anthony Anderson (3) | Actor |
| Chauncey Billups | Former NBA player |
| Muggsy Bogues (2) | Former NBA player |
| Nick Cannon (8) | TV personality, actor |
| Elena Delle Donne (2) | WNBA player |
| O'Shea Jackson, Jr. | Actor |
| Terrence J (4) | TV personality, actor |
| Marc Lasry | Milwaukee Bucks owner |
| Joel David Moore (2) | Actor |
| Jason Sudeikis (2) | Actor, comedian |
Head coach: Kevin Hart (actor)
Assistant coach: Becky Hammon (NBA assistant coach, San Antonio Spurs)
Assistant coach: Isaiah Thomas (NBA player, Boston Celtics)
Assistant coach: Andre Drummond (NBA player, Detroit Pistons)

Team Canada
| Player | Background |
|---|---|
| Eugenie Bouchard | Professional tennis player |
| Win Butler (2) | Singer, Arcade Fire |
| Tom Cavanagh (2) | Actor |
| Rick Fox (4) | NBA TV analyst |
| Stephan James | Actor |
| Tracy McGrady | Former NBA player |
| Milos Raonic | Professional tennis player |
| Drew Scott (2) | TV host, Property Brothers |
| Jonathan Scott (2) | TV host, Property Brothers |
| Tammy Sutton-Brown | Former WNBA player |
| Kris Wu | Actor, rapper |
Head coach: Drake (rapper)
Assistant coach: Steve Nash (former NBA player)
Assistant coach: José Bautista (MLB player, Toronto Blue Jays)
Assistant coach: DeMar DeRozan (NBA player, Toronto Raptors)

=== Rising Stars Challenge ===
Team USA
| Pos. | Player | Team | R/S |
|---|---|---|---|
| G | Jordan Clarkson | Los Angeles Lakers | Sophomore |
| G | Rodney Hood | Utah Jazz | Sophomore |
| G | Zach LaVine | Minnesota Timberwolves | Sophomore |
| C/F | Nerlens Noel^{INJ1} | Philadelphia 76ers | Sophomore |
| C | Jahlil Okafor | Philadelphia 76ers | Rookie |
| F | Jabari Parker | Milwaukee Bucks | Sophomore |
| G | Elfrid Payton | Orlando Magic | Sophomore |
| G | D'Angelo Russell | Los Angeles Lakers | Rookie |
| G | Marcus Smart | Boston Celtics | Sophomore |
| C | Karl-Anthony Towns | Minnesota Timberwolves | Rookie |
| G | Devin Booker^{REP1} | Phoenix Suns | Rookie |
Head coach: Larry Drew (Cleveland Cavaliers)

Team World
| Pos. | Nat. | Player | Team | R/S |
|---|---|---|---|---|
| F/G | (Croatia) | Bojan Bogdanović | Brooklyn Nets | Sophomore |
| C | (Switzerland) | Clint Capela | Houston Rockets | Sophomore |
| G/F | (Croatia) | Mario Hezonja | Orlando Magic | Rookie |
| C | (Serbia) | Nikola Jokić | Denver Nuggets | Rookie |
| F | (Montenegro) | Nikola Mirotić^{INJ2} | Chicago Bulls | Sophomore |
| G | (Democratic Republic of the Congo) | Emmanuel Mudiay | Denver Nuggets | Rookie |
| G | (Brazil) | Raul Neto | Utah Jazz | Rookie |
| F/C | (Latvia) | Kristaps Porziņģis | New York Knicks | Rookie |
| F/C | (Canada) | Dwight Powell | Dallas Mavericks | Sophomore |
| F/G | (Canada) | Andrew Wiggins | Minnesota Timberwolves | Sophomore |
| F | (Canada) | Trey Lyles^{REP2} | Utah Jazz | Rookie |
Head coach: (Italy) Ettore Messina (San Antonio Spurs)

^INJ1 Nerlens Noel was unable to participate due to injury.
^REP1 Devin Booker was named as Noel's replacement.
^INJ2 Nikola Mirotić was unable to participate due to injury.
^REP2 Trey Lyles was named as Mirotić's replacement.

TNT

February 12
9:00 pm ET

Boxscore

Team USA 157, Team World 154
Scoring by half: 88–79, 69–75
| Pts: Zach LaVine 30; Rebs: LaVine, Towns 7 Asts: D'Angelo Russell 7 | Pts: Porziņģis, Mudiay 30; Rebs: Dwight Powell 11; Asts: Emmanuel Mudiay 10 |

Air Canada Centre, Toronto
Attendance: 18,298
Referees:
- #72 J. T. Orr
- #52 Scott Twardoski
- #46 Ben Taylor

Team USA won 157–154 in the highest scoring game in Rising Stars Challenge history. Zach LaVine was named MVP, leading all of the USA team with 30 points while also recording 7 rebounds and 4 assists. Jordan Clarkson, D'Angelo Russell, and Devin Booker all scored over 20 points, with Russell also recording 7 assists. Kristaps Porziņģis and Emmanuel Mudiay led the way for Team World with 30 points each, with Andrew Wiggins also scoring 29 points.

=== Skills Challenge ===
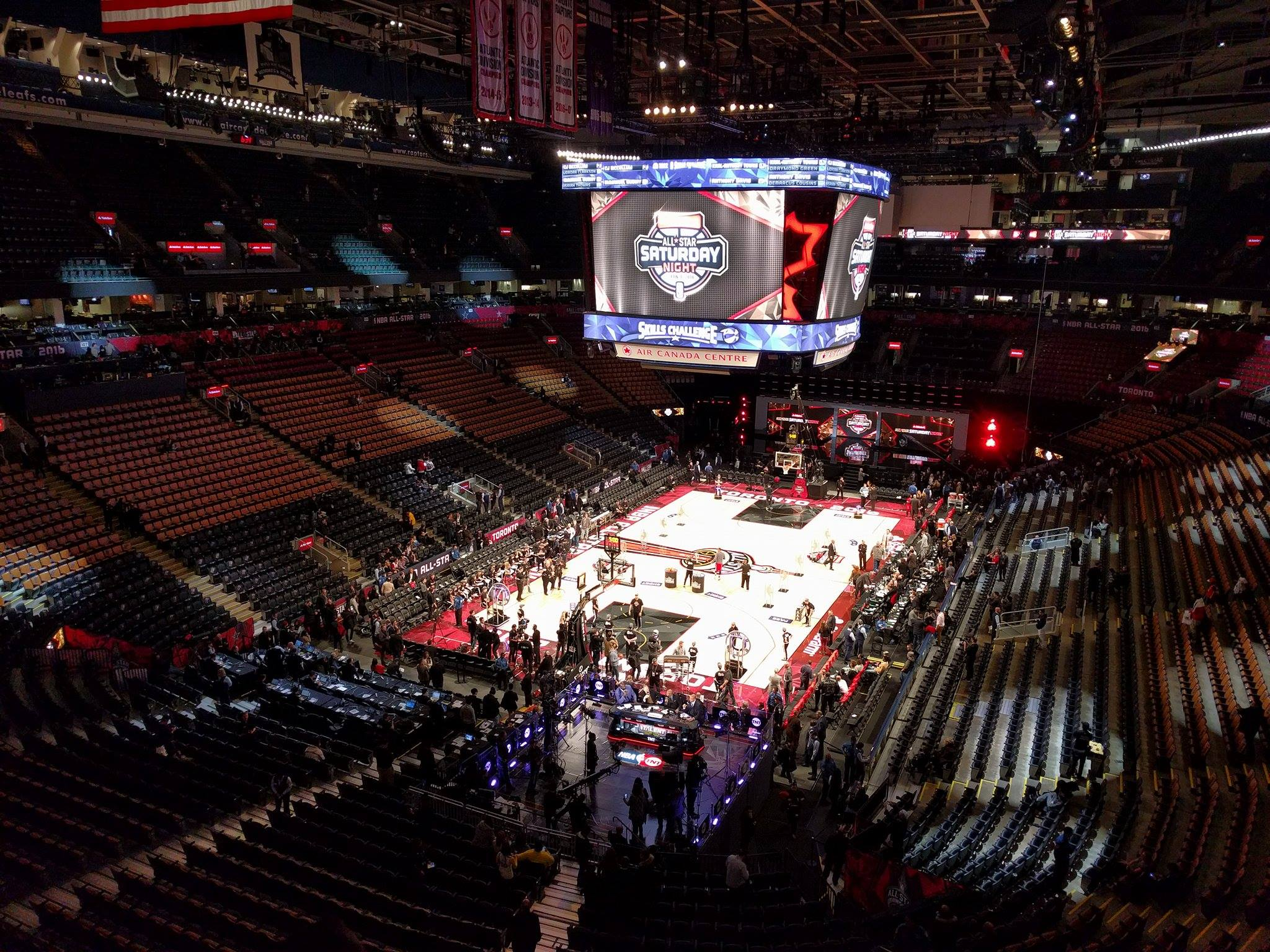
Skills Challenge Competition 2016 Toronto

Contestants
| Pos. | Player | Team | Height | Weight |
|---|---|---|---|---|
| G | Patrick Beverley^{INJ} | Houston Rockets | 6–1 | 185 |
| G | Jordan Clarkson | Los Angeles Lakers | 6–5 | 194 |
| G | CJ McCollum | Portland Trail Blazers | 6–3 | 190 |
| G | Isaiah Thomas | Boston Celtics | 5–9 | 185 |
| G | Emmanuel Mudiay^{REP} | Denver Nuggets | 6–5 | 200 |
| C | DeMarcus Cousins | Sacramento Kings | 6–11 | 270 |
| F/C | Anthony Davis | New Orleans Pelicans | 6–11 | 253 |
| F | Draymond Green | Golden State Warriors | 6–7 | 230 |
| C | Karl-Anthony Towns | Minnesota Timberwolves | 7–0 | 244 |

^INJPatrick Beverley was unable to participate due to an ankle injury.
^REPEmmanuel Mudiay was selected to replace Beverley.

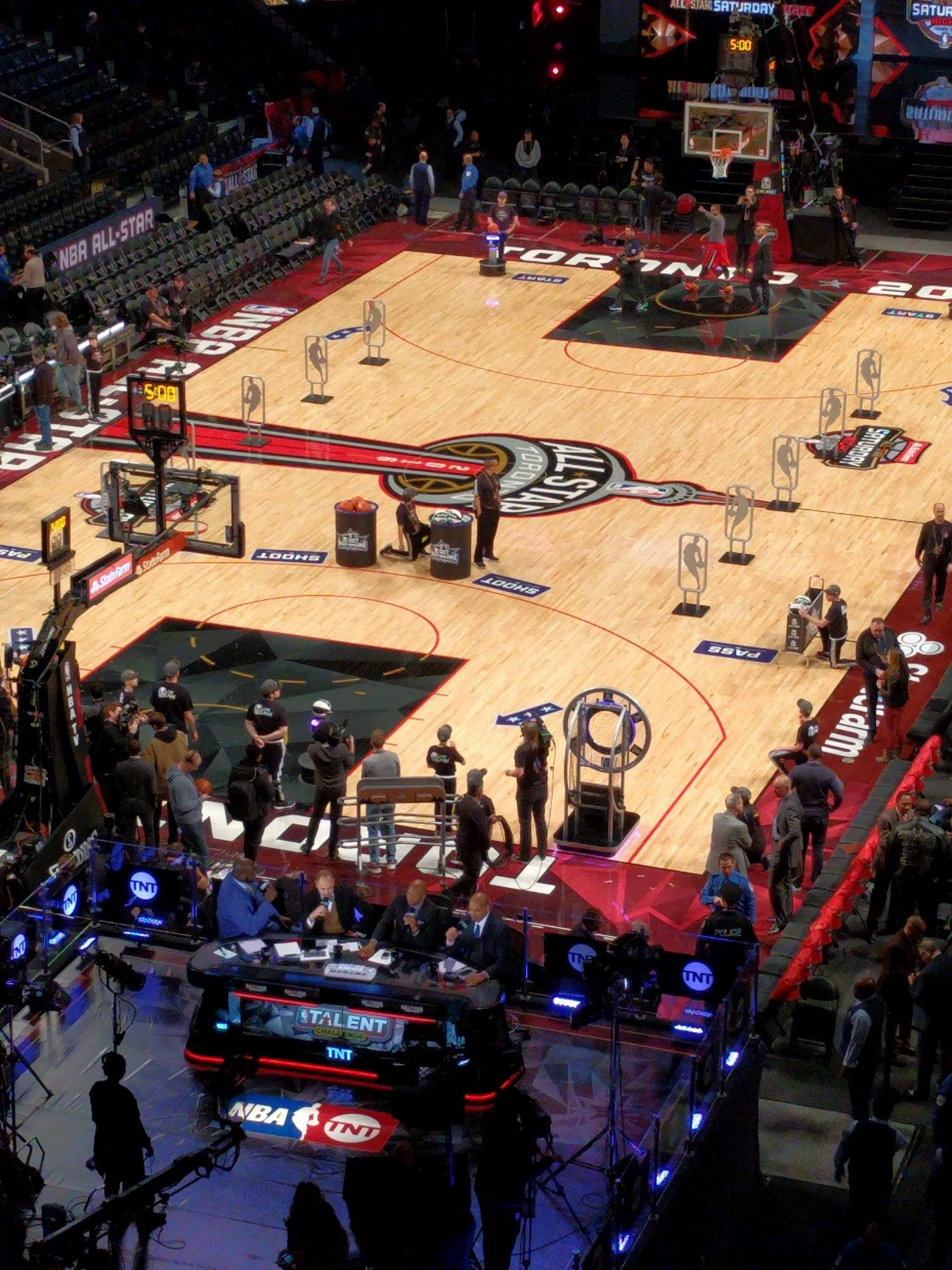
Skills Challenge Competition 2016 Toronto

Quarterfinals
CJ McCollum (Portland) | O
Jordan Clarkson (L.A. Lakers) | X
Isaiah Thomas (Boston) | O
Emmanuel Mudiay (Denver) | X
Draymond Green (Golden State) | X
Karl-Anthony Towns (Minnesota) | O
DeMarcus Cousins (Sacramento) | O
Anthony Davis (New Orleans) | X

Semifinals
CJ McCollum (Portland) | X
Isaiah Thomas (Boston) | O
Karl-Anthony Towns (Minnesota) | O
DeMarcus Cousins (Sacramento) | X

Finals
Isaiah Thomas (Boston) | X
Karl-Anthony Towns (Minnesota) | O

=== Three-Point Contest ===
Teammates Stephen Curry and Klay Thompson of the Golden State Warriors, known as the Splash Brothers, were the favorites to win the contest. The betting site, Bovada, listed the defending-champion Curry as the favorite to win with 10–11 odds, while Thompson was second at 9–2. Contestant Devin Booker would be the youngest participant to ever compete in the Three-Point contest at 19 years old. Chris Bosh was announced as a first-time participant for the event, but he would be replaced by CJ McCollum due to an injury before the event.

Contestants
| Pos. | Player | Team | Height | Weight | First round | Final round |
|---|---|---|---|---|---|---|
| G | Klay Thompson | Golden State Warriors | 6–7 | 215 | 22 | 27 |
| G | Stephen Curry | Golden State Warriors | 6–3 | 190 | 21 | 23 |
| G | Devin Booker | Phoenix Suns | 6–6 | 206 | 20 (12) | 16 |
| G | JJ Redick | Los Angeles Clippers | 6–4 | 190 | 20 (9) | — |
| G | James Harden | Houston Rockets | 6–5 | 220 | 20 (8) | — |
| G | Kyle Lowry | Toronto Raptors | 6–0 | 205 | 15 | — |
| G | CJ McCollum^{REP} | Portland Trail Blazers | 6–3 | 190 | 14 | — |
| G/F | Khris Middleton | Milwaukee Bucks | 6–8 | 234 | 13 | — |
| F/C | Chris Bosh^{INJ} | Miami Heat | 6–11 | 235 | — | — |

^INJ Chris Bosh was unable to participate due to a calf injury.
^REP CJ McCollum was selected as Bosh's replacement.

(#) – Indicates score from 30-second tiebreaker

=== Slam Dunk Contest ===
Zach LaVine became the first back-to-back Slam Dunk Contest winner since Nate Robinson, edging out Aaron Gordon with four consecutive perfect scores in the final round.

Contestants
| Pos. | Player | Team | Height | Weight | First round | Final round (Note: Includes two tiebreakers) |
|---|---|---|---|---|---|---|
| G | Zach LaVine | Minnesota Timberwolves | 6–5 | 185 | 99 (50+49) | 200 (50+50+50+50) |
| F | Aaron Gordon | Orlando Magic | 6–9 | 220 | 94 (45+49) | 197 (50+50+50+47) |
| C | Andre Drummond | Detroit Pistons | 6–11 | 279 | 75 (36+39) | – |
| G | Will Barton | Denver Nuggets | 6–6 | 175 | 74 (44+30) | – |
