= Canadian Hockey League =

Governing organization for major junior hockey in Canada

- Sport: Ice hockey
- Founded: 1975; 51 years ago
- President: Dan MacKenzie
- No. of teams: 61
- Countries: Canada; United States
- Most recent champion: Kitchener Rangers (3)
- Broadcasters: TSN; RDS; CBC; Rogers TV (OHL); Eastlink TV/TVA Sports (QMJHL)
- Website: CHL.ca

The Canadian Hockey League (CHL; French: Ligue canadienne de hockey, LCH) is an umbrella organization that represents the three Canada-based major junior ice hockey leagues. The CHL was founded in 1975 as the Canadian Major Junior Hockey League, and is composed of its three member leagues, the Western Hockey League (WHL), Ontario Hockey League (OHL), and Quebec Maritimes Junior Hockey League (QMJHL). For the 2025–26 season, its three leagues and 61 teams represent ten Canadian provinces (52 teams) as well as four American states (nine teams).

The CHL schedule culminates in the Memorial Cup tournament, which sees each of the three league playoff champions, as well as a host team, play a round-robin tournament to determine a national champion. The CHL also hosts the CHL USA Prospects Challenge, for the top draft eligible players in the league, and formerly the CHL Canada/Russia Series, a six-game all-star exhibition series against a team of Russian juniors. In response to the 2022 Russian invasion of Ukraine, the Canadian Hockey League cancelled the event in 2022.

The current president of the CHL is Dan MacKenzie.

== Introduction ==
The Canadian Hockey League (CHL) is the governing body for Major Junior hockey (formerly known as Tier One Junior A), the top level of amateur hockey in Canada. The CHL currently oversees the Western Hockey League (WHL), the Ontario Hockey League (OHL) and the Quebec Maritimes Junior Hockey League (QMJHL), with the OHL and WHL having teams in both Canada and the United States. Each league plays individual regular season schedules, and playoffs. The annual CHL championship is determined by the Memorial Cup tournament held in May.

The CHL is generally considered the world's top junior hockey league for developing professional players and is a key supplier of new players and officials for the many North American professional hockey leagues, such as the National Hockey League, American Hockey League, and the ECHL. If a CHL player does not sign a professional contract, many also opt to play for U Sports (formerly Canadian Interuniversity Sport - CIS) and go to school due to CHL sponsored scholarship programs. Due to the use of paying player stipends and allowing junior players that have signed entry-level contracts with the NHL, CHL players were historically considered to be professionals by the NCAA, and thus ineligible to play college hockey in the United States. However, the NCAA changed its position and decided that CHL players were no longer ineligible as of the 2025–26 season. The decision was made after a class action was filed on behalf of a player who was declared ineligible after having played two exhibition games in the OHL when he was 16 years old.

== History ==
On May 9, 1975, officials from the Western Canada Hockey League, the Ontario Major Junior Hockey League and the Quebec Major Junior Hockey League, announced a constitution to establish the Canadian Major Junior Hockey League (CMJHL) composed of the three leagues under one umbrella. The new organization wanted standard contracts for all players, consistent dollar amounts for development fees paid by professional leagues to sign junior players, and for the National Hockey League and the World Hockey Association to work together on a common drafting program to eliminate bidding wars. The CMJHL sought to represent players directly instead of agents, and proposed an escalating development fee schedule if professional teams wanted to sign a player while he was still eligible for junior hockey. The league also proposed to allow some players under professional contracts to continue playing in junior hockey. Ontario's commissioner Tubby Schmalz defended the validity of the constitution, despite a challenge from Alan Eagleson that it violated antitrust laws in Canada and the United States.

On July 30, 2019, Dan MacKenzie was announced as the new full-time president as of September 2019, taking over for David Branch. In March 2020, the CHL and its constituent leagues cancelled the remainder of the 2019–20 regular seasons, playoffs and the 2020 Memorial Cup, due to the COVID-19 pandemic in North America.

The QMJHL and WHL played a 2020–21 season with limitations; the WHL played a shortened season consisting exclusively of regional play and no playoffs, with "bubbles" used for all B.C. and East Division games. The QMJHL was the only CHL league to play a full season with playoffs, albeit with disruptions and the use of bubbles due to public health orders in Quebec and travel restrictions in Atlantic Canada. Due to public health orders in Ontario, the OHL indefinitely delayed, and later cancelled the 2020–21 season. The Memorial Cup was cancelled and not awarded for the second consecutive season.

On July 21, 2021, the CHL announced a new national media rights deal with Bell Media and the CBC (replacing a long-standing relationship with Sportsnet), under which TSN (English) and RDS (French) will serve as the CHL's national media partners. TSN will carry 30 regular season games per-season, RDS will carry 20 regular season games per-season, and both will carry coverage of selected playoff games and CHL national events (including the Memorial Cup). CBC Sports will also carry coverage of selected games beginning in the 2021–22 season, including a package of early-season games, and a game of the week package on TSN, RDS, and CBC Gem.

=== Exceptional player status ===
Exceptional player status allows skilled, underage hockey players to enter the major junior circuit early. Hockey Canada determines if an underage player is eligible for "exceptional status". The clause was introduced in the CHL rule book in the 2005–06 season. As of 2024, nine players have been granted exceptional status: John Tavares, Aaron Ekblad, Sean Day, Connor McDavid, Joseph Veleno, Shane Wright, Connor Bedard, Michael Misa, and Landon DuPont. The status has been granted six times to OHL prospects, twice in the WHL, and once in the QMJHL. As of 2024, seven have gone number one in their respective major junior drafts and four have been selected first overall in their respective NHL drafts. In 2024, the "Western Canadian Development Model" was approved to allow players granted exceptional status as early as age 12, to play a half season with the local WHL team at age 15, without further application for exceptional status; the change was first exercised by Maddox Schultz.

== Annual events ==
=== Memorial Cup ===
The Memorial Cup Tournament is the championship of Junior Canadian hockey. Each year it features the champions from the WHL, OHL, and QMJHL and the host CHL team. The host team changes from year to year, and is selected by a bidding process prior to the start of each season. The annual event is one of the biggest sporting events in North America, attracting thousands of spectators and generating increasing revenue for both the CHL teams and the host city.

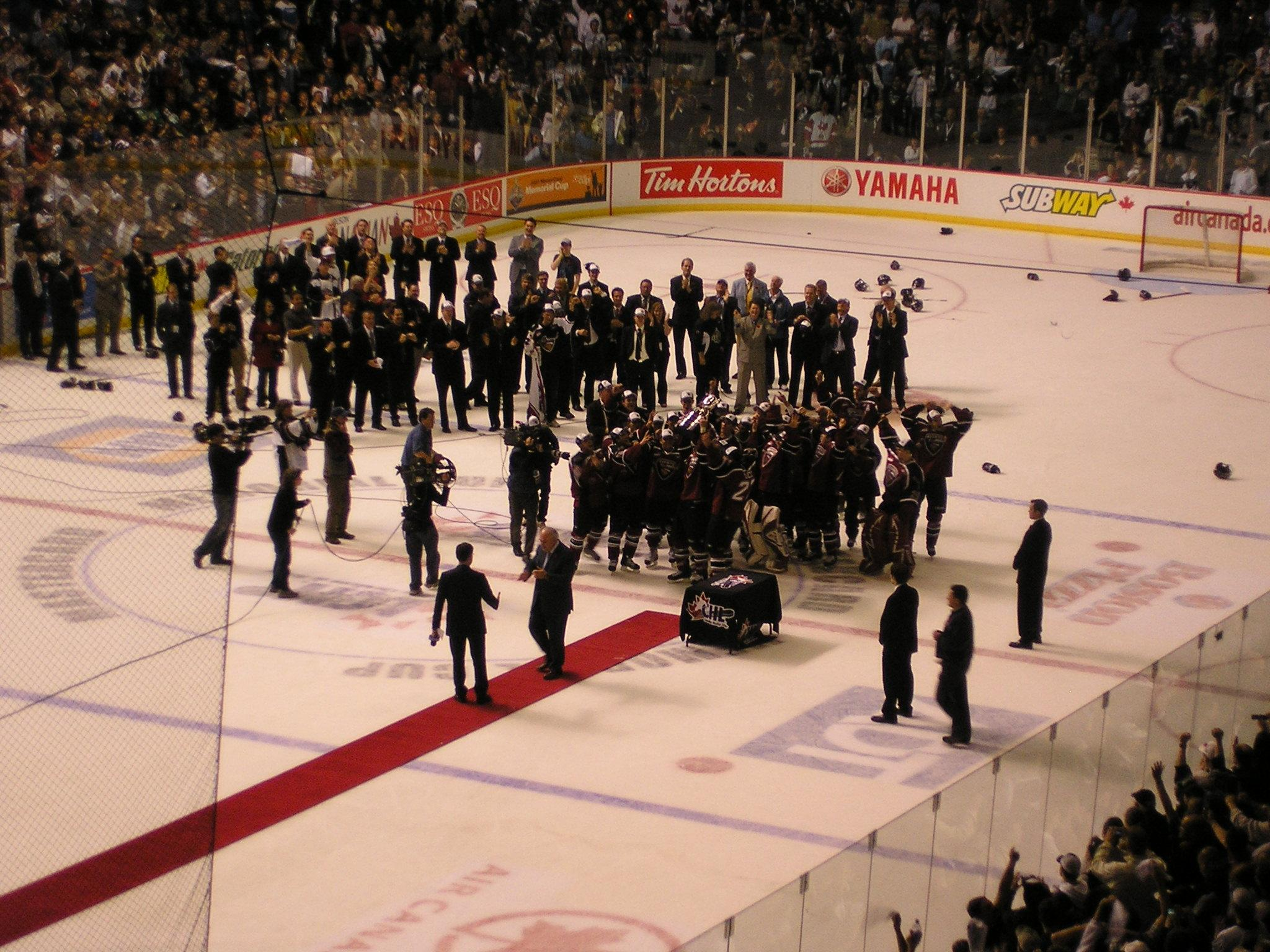
Memorial Cup celebration

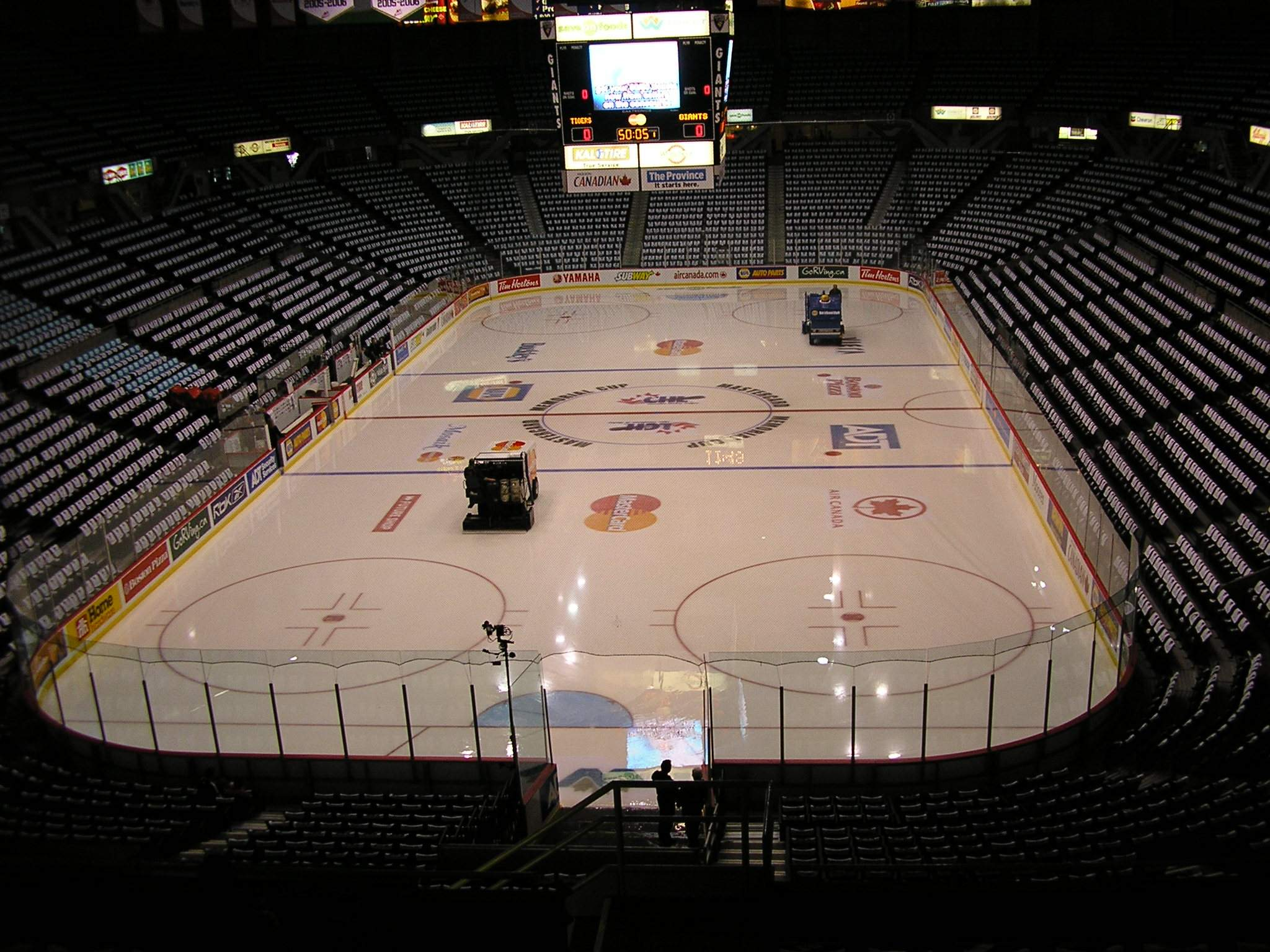
Memorial Cup

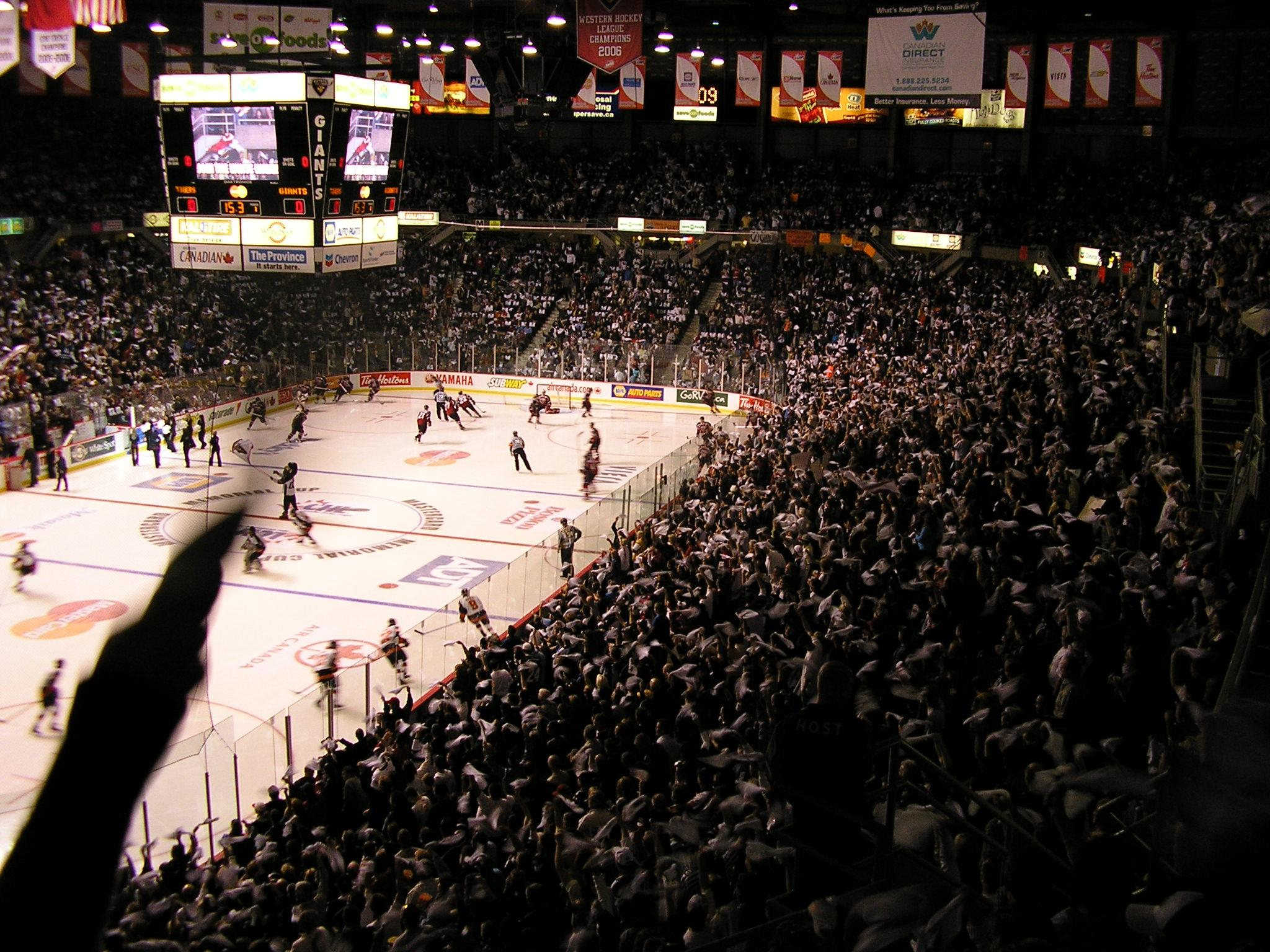
Memorial Cup warmup

=== CHL USA Prospects Challenge ===
The CHL USA Prospects Challenge is an annual series between the CHL and the USA Hockey National Team Development Program. The two-game series showcases the talents of top prospects for the upcoming NHL entry draft, in a collaborative effort with the NHL Central Scouting Bureau to select the participants.

=== CHL Canada/Russia Series ===
The CHL Canada/Russia Series was an annual junior ice hockey exhibition tournament held between a select team of Russian players and all-star teams representing the Quebec Maritimes Junior Hockey League, the Ontario Hockey League and the Western Hockey League. The event was organized by the Canadian Hockey League and consisted of six games total each year, with the Russian Selects playing two games versus each league's all-star team. All games were broadcast nationally in Canada on Sportsnet. The series often featured players from the Canadian national junior team, and the Russian national junior team.

In response to the 2022 Russian invasion of Ukraine, the Canadian Hockey League cancelled the event in 2022.

=== CHL Import Draft ===
The CHL Import Draft is an annual event in which every team in the Canadian Hockey League may select the rights to eligible import players. An import is classified as a player whose parents are not residents of Canada or the United States. The draft is conducted online, during the last week of June, or first week of July. Teams from the Western Hockey League, Ontario Hockey League, and Quebec Maritimes Junior Hockey League, systematically take turns making selections in reverse order of the team's standings in the CHL from the previous season. Teams can have a maximum of two imports, which may only be obtained through the draft.

== Trophies and awards ==
The Canadian Hockey League awards sixteen annual trophies for accomplishments during the regular and at the Memorial Cup to top individuals and teams among its three member leagues. The Memorial Cup is the top award for the championship team at the end-of-season Memorial Cup tournament. A set of five individual awards are given for performance at the tournament. In the regular season, Canadian Hockey League also presents ten annual awards. The nominees for each individual award are determined by the winner of the corresponding award handed out by each of the Canadian Hockey League's three member leagues.

Memorial Cup — Tournament awards
Trophy name	Recognition	Founded
Memorial Cup	Canadian Hockey League champion	1919
Stafford Smythe Memorial Trophy	Most valuable player	1972
George Parsons Trophy	Most sportsmanlike player	1974
Hap Emms Memorial Trophy	Outstanding goaltender	1975
Ed Chynoweth Trophy	Leading scorer	1996
Memorial Cup All-Star Team	Best player at each position	1975

Regular season — Individual awards
Trophy name	Recognition	Founded
Brian Kilrea Coach of the Year Award	Coach of the year	1988
CHL Player of the Year	Most outstanding player	1975
CHL Top Scorer Award	Top scoring player	1994
CHL Goaltender of the Year	Most outstanding goaltender	1988
CHL Defenceman of the Year	Most outstanding defenceman	1988
CHL Rookie of the Year	Most outstanding rookie	1988
CHL Top Draft Prospect Award	Top draft prospect	1991
CHL Scholastic Player of the Year	Top scholastic player	1988
CHL Sportsman of the Year	Most sportsmanlike player	1990
CHL Humanitarian of the Year	Top humanitarian player	1993
CHL Executive of the Year	Most outstanding executive	1989

Trophies and awards in the Canadian Hockey League
Memorial Cup

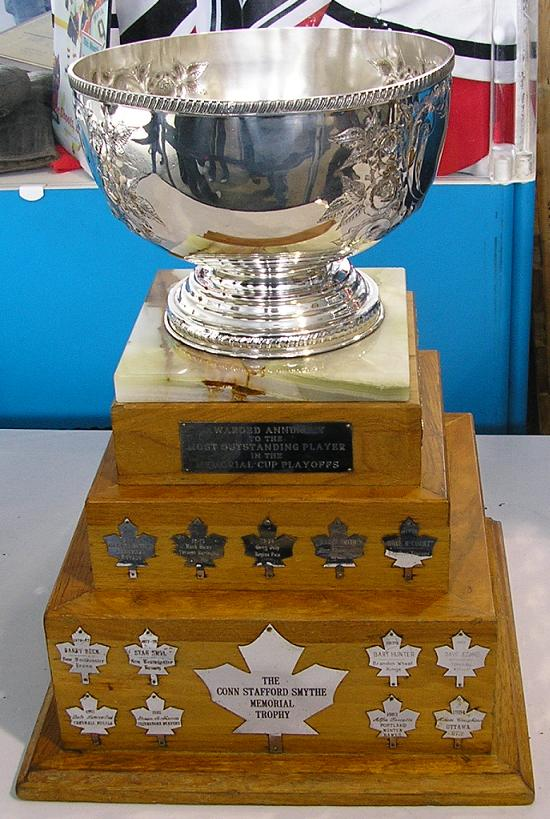
Stafford Smythe Memorial Trophy

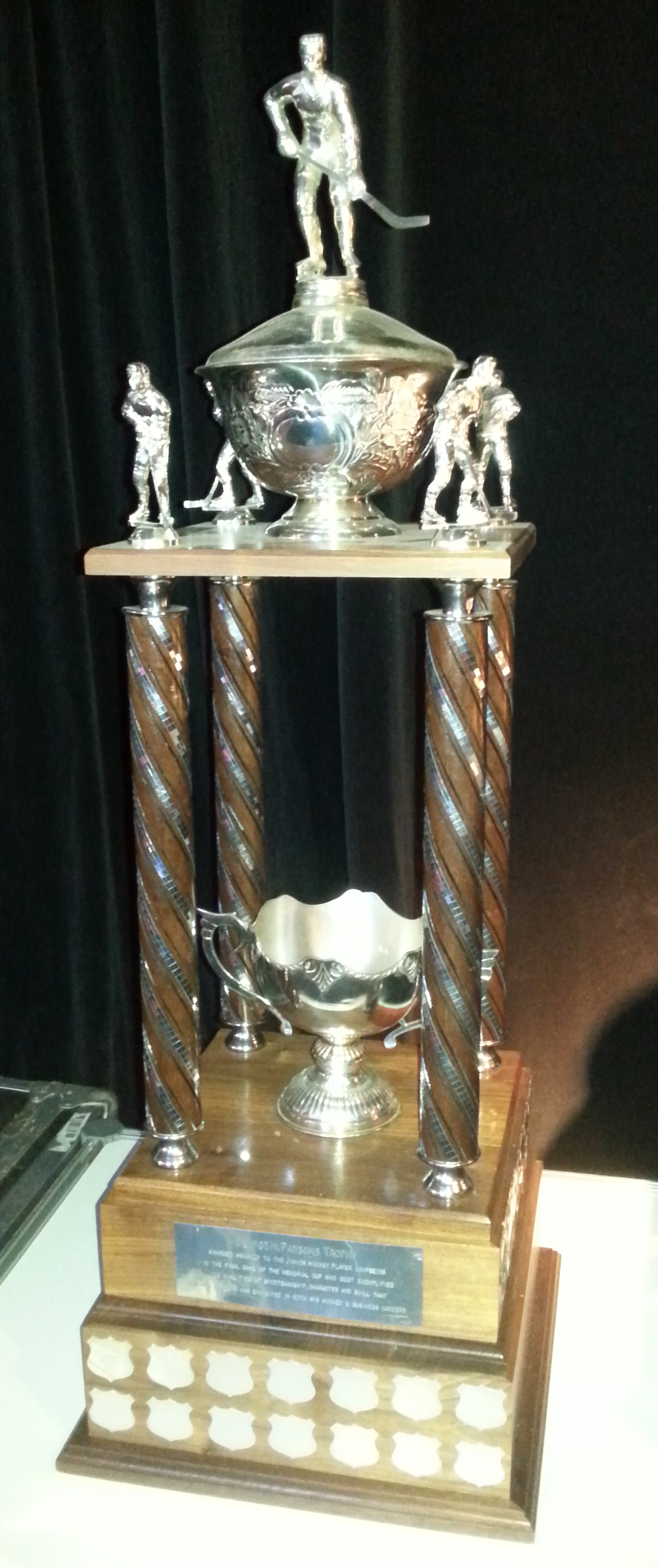
George Parsons Trophy

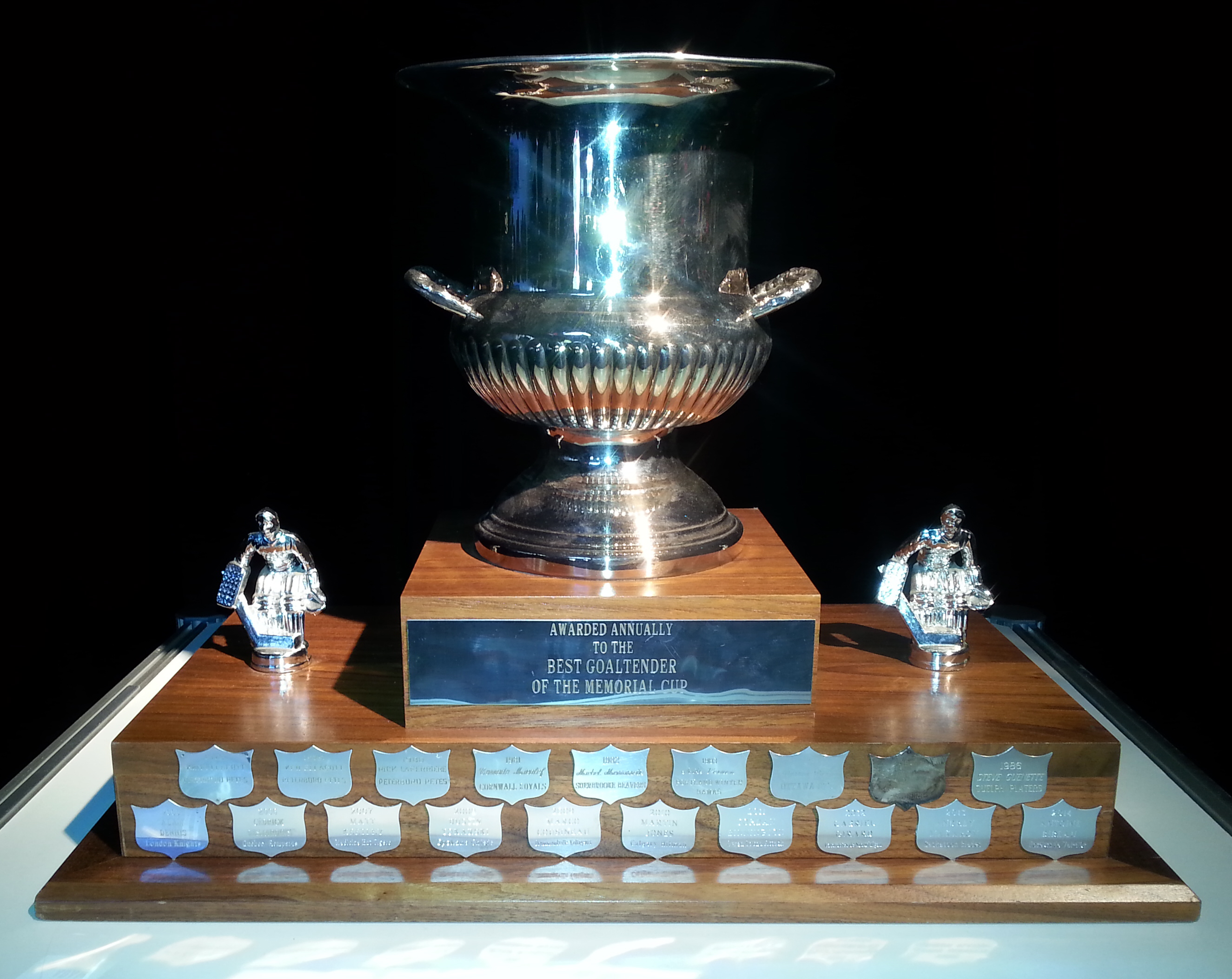
Hap Emms Memorial Trophy

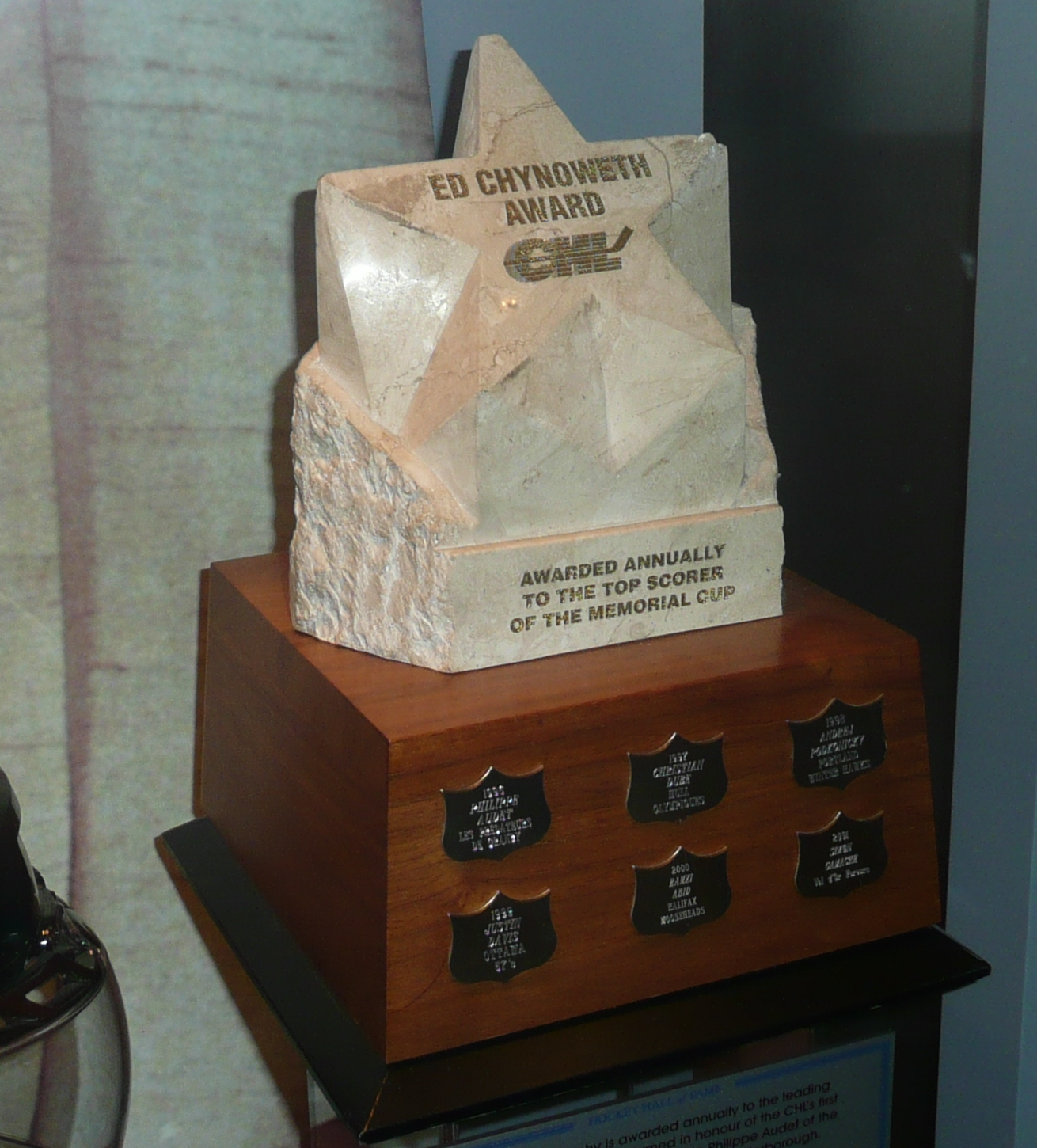
Ed Chynoweth Trophy

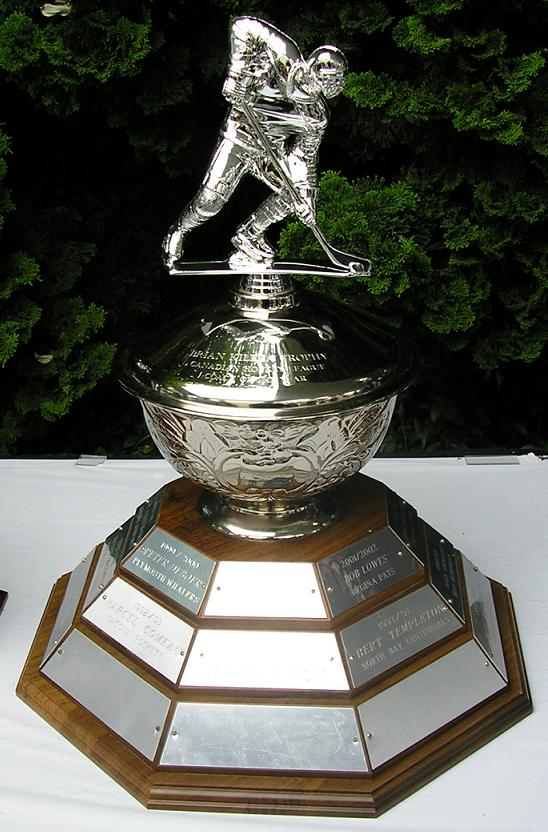
Brian Kilrea Coach of the Year Award

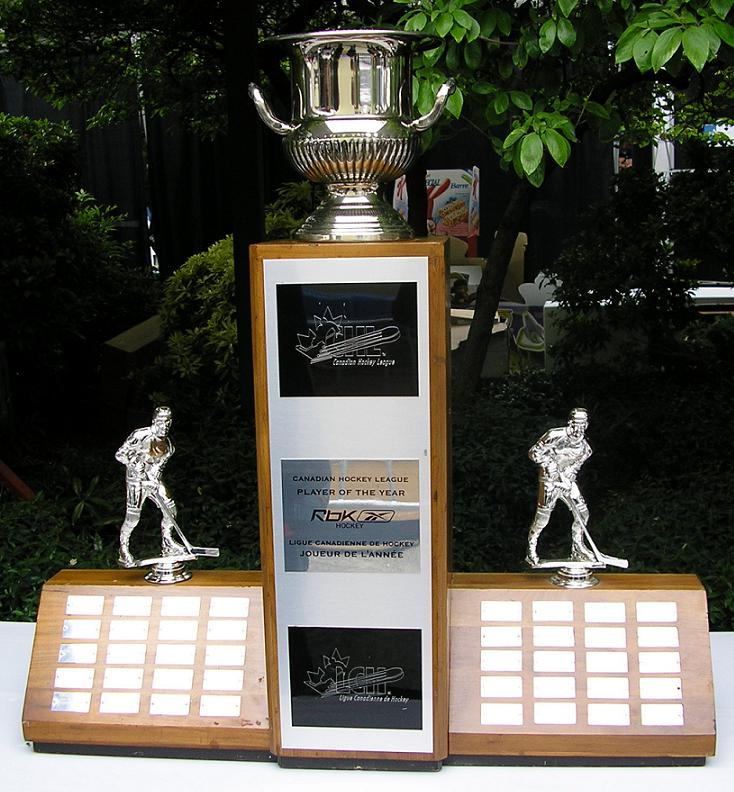
CHL Player of the Year

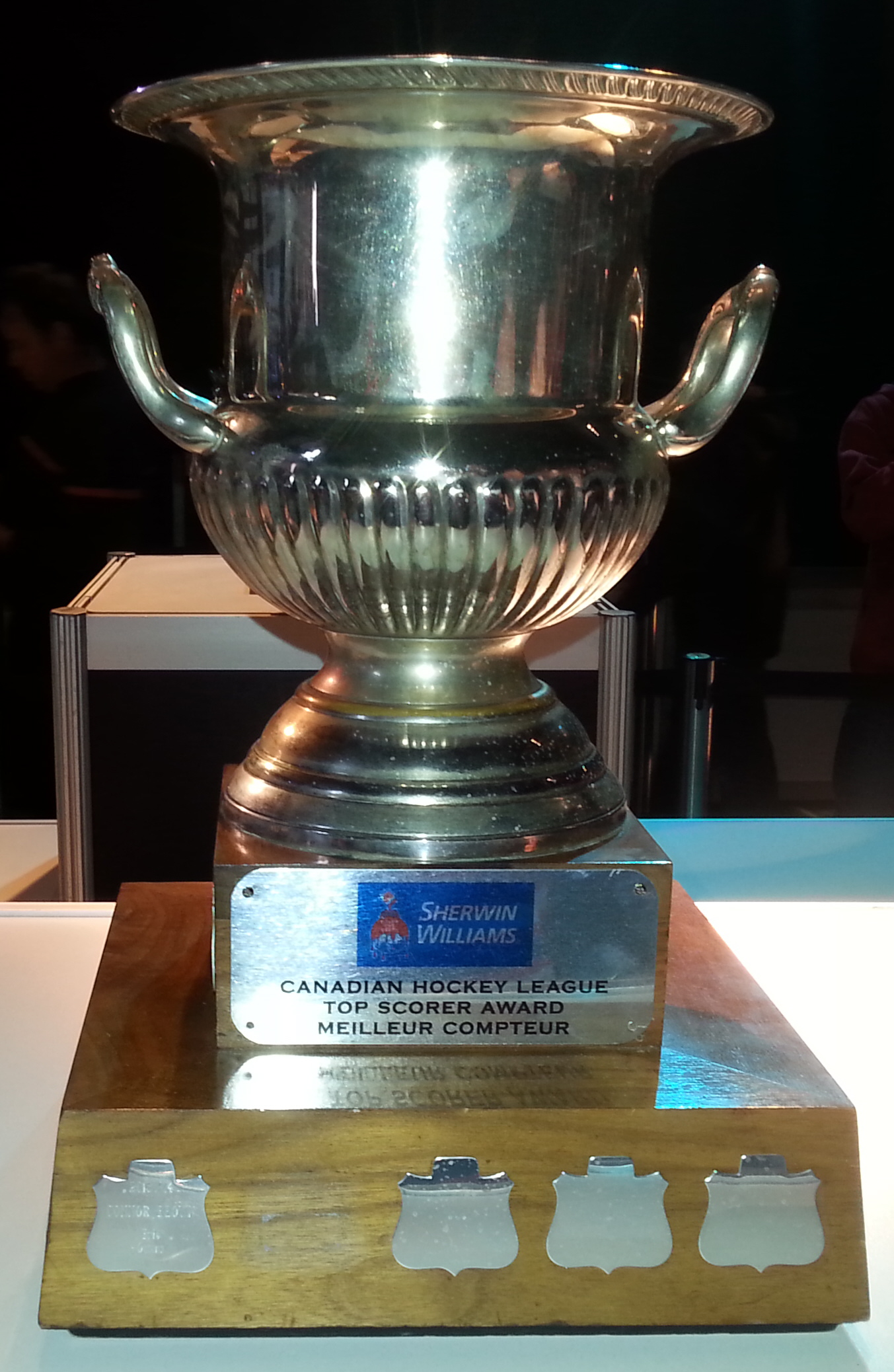
CHL Top Scorer Award

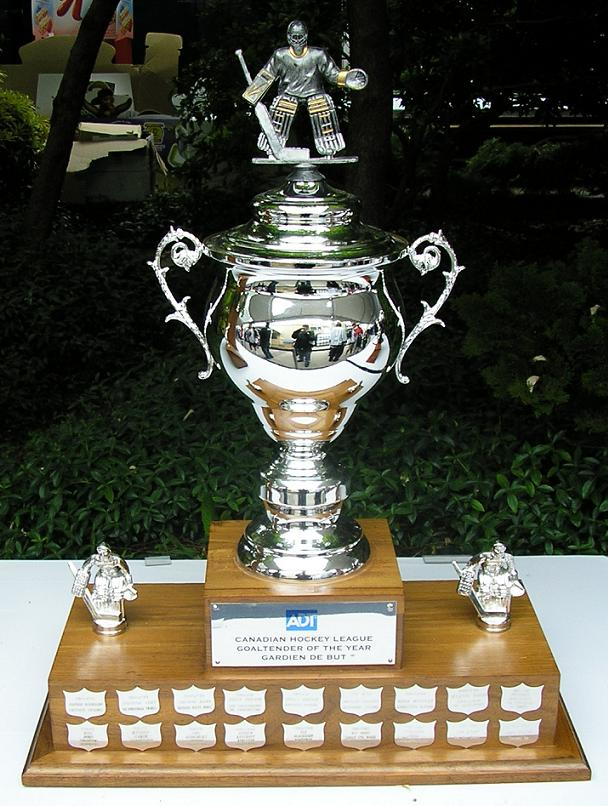
CHL Goaltender of the Year

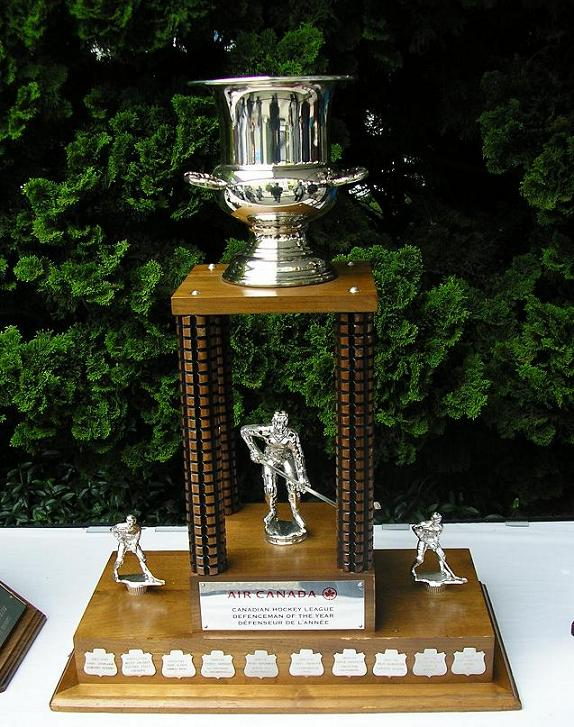
CHL Defenceman of Year

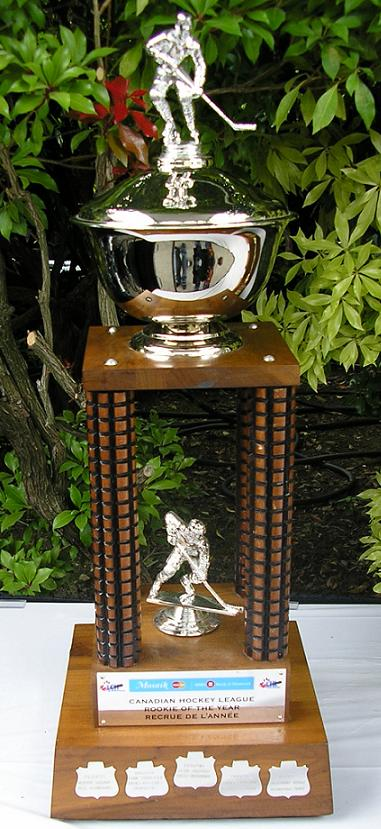
CHL Rookie of the Year

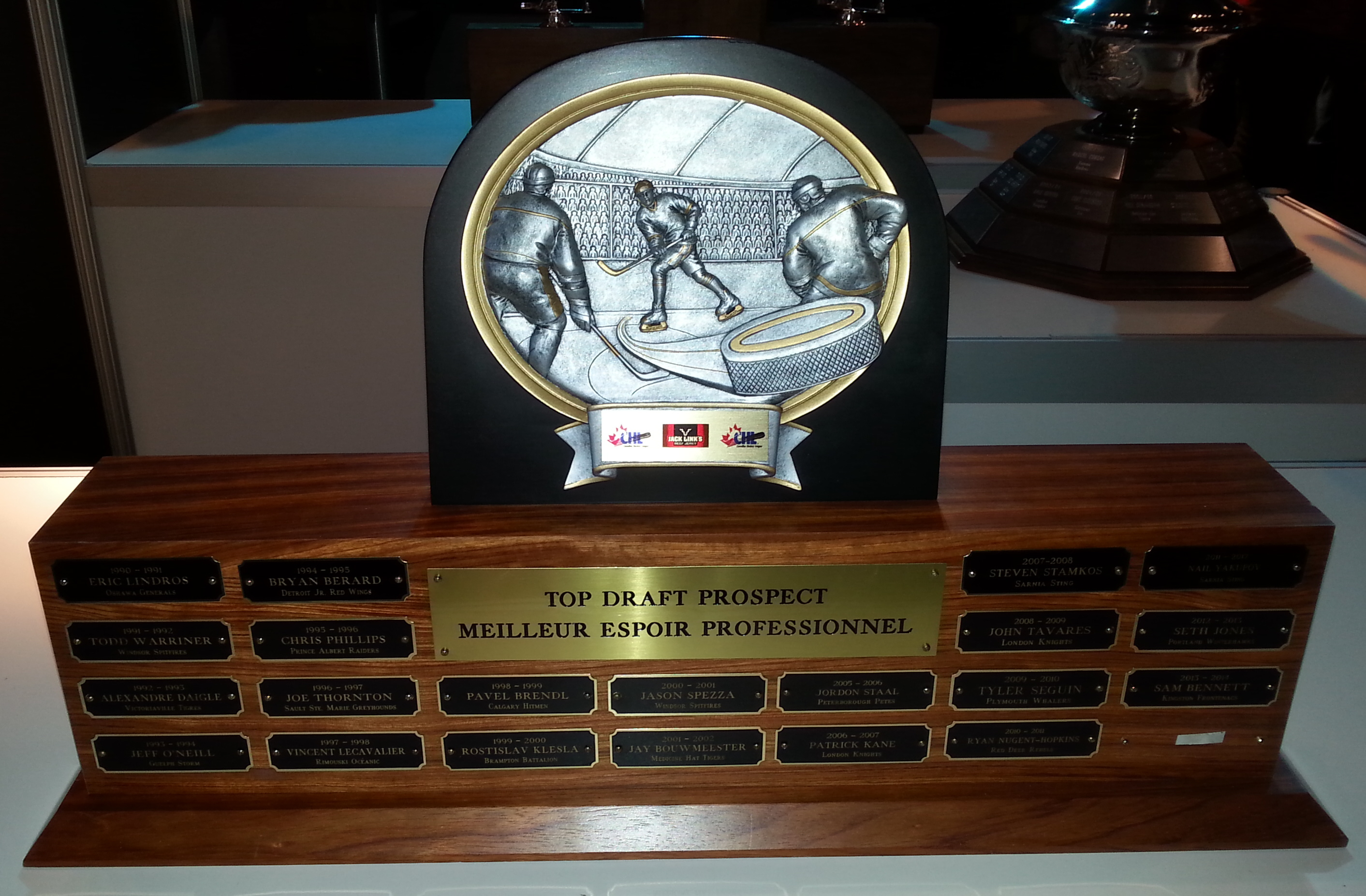
CHL Top Draft Prospect Award

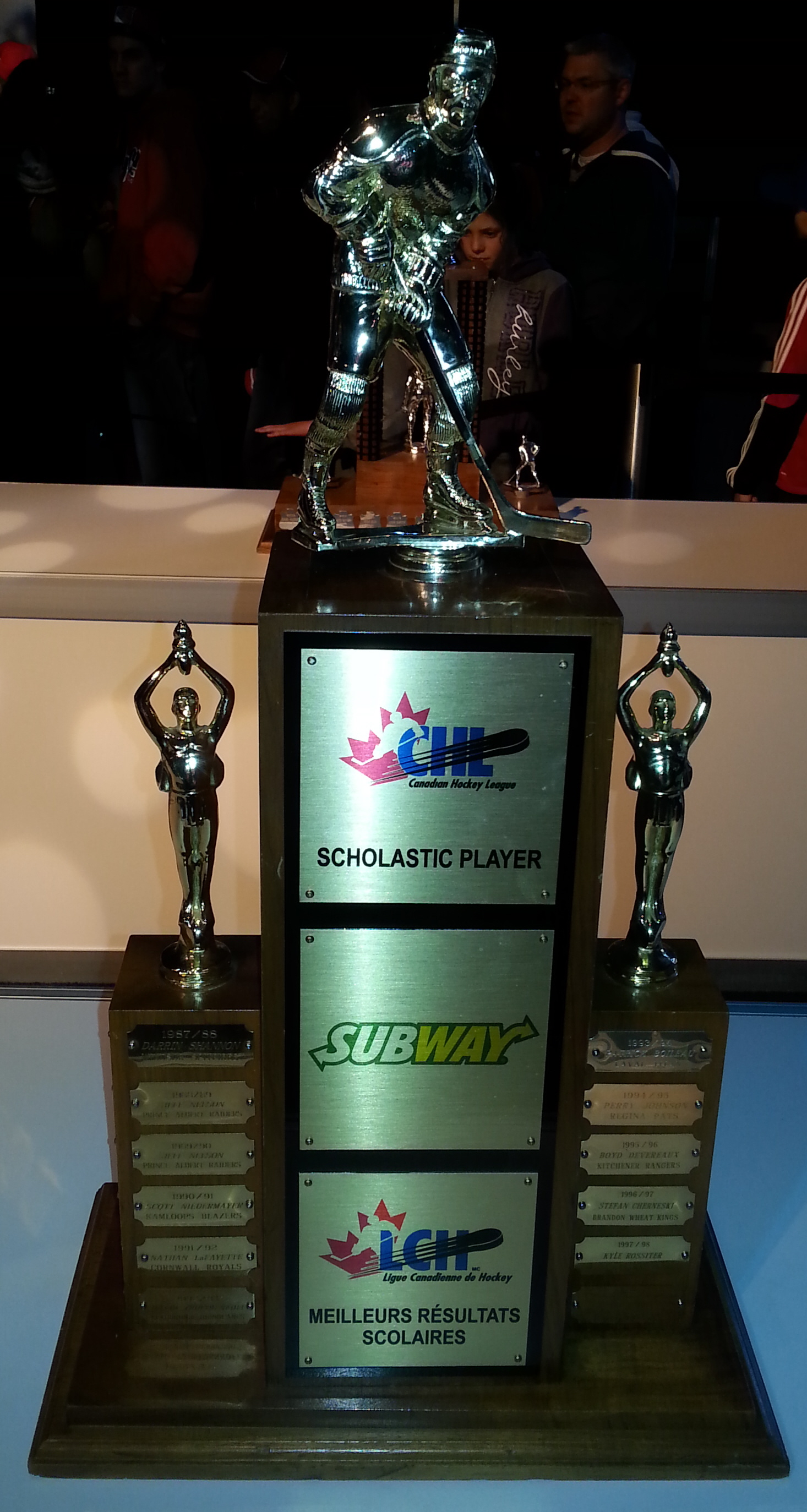
CHL Scholastic Player of the Year

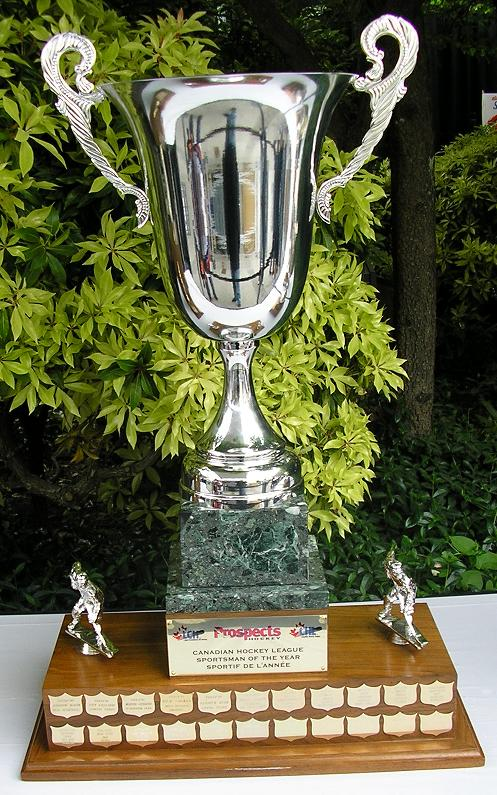
CHL Sportsman of the Year

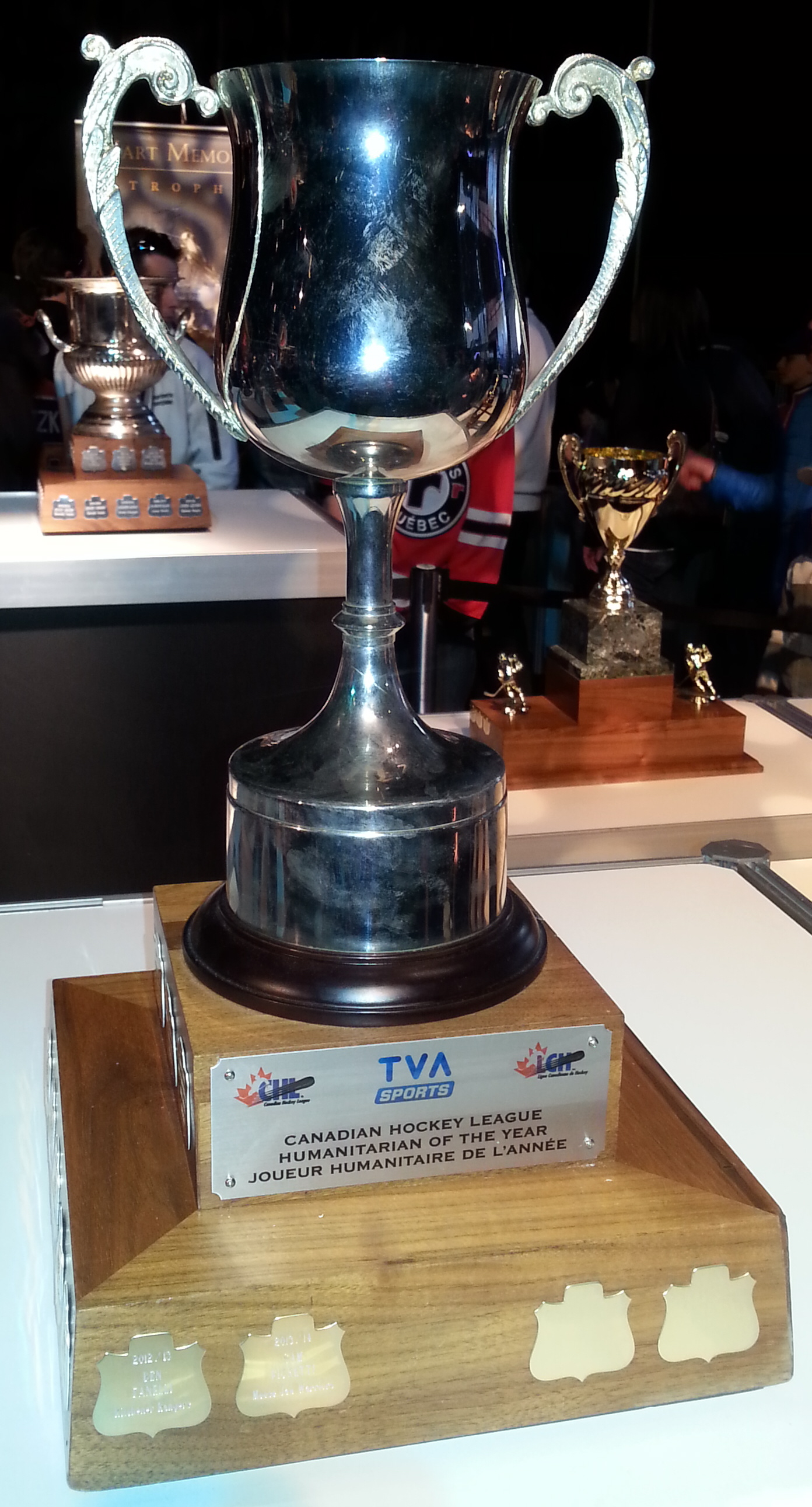
CHL Humanitarian of the Year

== Teams ==
For the 2025–26 season, the league includes 61 teams located in ten Canadian provinces (52 teams) and four American states (9 teams).

- The Western Hockey League, with 23 teams in British Columbia (6), Alberta (5), Saskatchewan (5), Manitoba (1), Washington (5), and Oregon (1).
- The Ontario Hockey League, with 20 teams in Ontario (17), Michigan (2), and Pennsylvania (1).
- The Quebec Maritimes Junior Hockey League, with 18 teams in Quebec (12), New Brunswick (2), Newfoundland and Labrador (1), Nova Scotia (2), and Prince Edward Island (1).

Ontario Hockey League

- Barrie Colts
- Brampton Steelheads
- Brantford Bulldogs
- Erie Otters
- Flint Firebirds
- Guelph Storm
- Kingston Frontenacs
- Kitchener Rangers
- London Knights
- Niagara IceDogs
- North Bay Battalion
- Oshawa Generals
- Ottawa 67's
- Owen Sound Attack
- Peterborough Petes
- Saginaw Spirit
- Sarnia Sting
- Sault Ste. Marie Greyhounds
- Sudbury Wolves
- Windsor Spitfires

Quebec Maritimes Junior Hockey League

- Baie-Comeau Drakkar
- Blainville-Boisbriand Armada
- Cape Breton Eagles
- Charlottetown Islanders
- Chicoutimi Saguenéens
- Drummondville Voltigeurs
- Gatineau Olympiques
- Halifax Mooseheads
- Moncton Wildcats
- Newfoundland Regiment
- Quebec Remparts
- Rimouski Océanic
- Rouyn-Noranda Huskies
- Saint John Sea Dogs
- Shawinigan Cataractes
- Sherbrooke Phoenix
- Val-d'Or Foreurs
- Victoriaville Tigres

Western Hockey League

- Brandon Wheat Kings
- Calgary Hitmen
- Edmonton Oil Kings
- Everett Silvertips
- Kamloops Blazers
- Kelowna Rockets
- Lethbridge Hurricanes
- Medicine Hat Tigers
- Moose Jaw Warriors
- Penticton Vees
- Portland Winterhawks
- Prince Albert Raiders
- Prince George Cougars
- Red Deer Rebels
- Regina Pats
- Saskatoon Blades
- Seattle Thunderbirds
- Spokane Chiefs
- Swift Current Broncos
- Tri-City Americans
- Vancouver Giants
- Victoria Royals
- Wenatchee Wild
