= NBA Canada Series =

Series of basketball games

The NBA Canada Series are a series of basketball games featuring National Basketball Association teams that are played in Canada.

== History ==
The first official series started in 2012, although previous preseason games had been played in Canada outside of Toronto before. Specifically, in October 1990, the Indiana Pacers played three games against the Bullets and Rockets. These 3 games were played in St. John's, Newfoundland and Labrador; Halifax, Nova Scotia; and Kitchener, Ontario. There was no series in 2017 due to the early start of the season. Planning for the series was overseen by Dan MacKenzie, vice president and managing director NBA Canada. There was also no series in 2020 and 2021 due to travel restrictions during the COVID-19 pandemic by the Canadian government that made it impossible for teams to cross the Canada–United States border.

== NBA Canada Series games ==
=== 2012 ===
October 19, 2012

| New York Knicks | 88–107 | Toronto Raptors |

(Canada) Bell Centre, Montreal

October 24, 2012

| Detroit Pistons | 76–95 | Minnesota Timberwolves |

(Canada) MTS Centre, Winnipeg

=== 2013 ===
October 20, 2013

| Boston Celtics | 89–104 | Minnesota Timberwolves |

(Canada) Bell Centre, Montreal

=== 2014 ===
October 5, 2014

| Sacramento Kings | 94–99 | Toronto Raptors |

(Canada) Rogers Arena, Vancouver

October 24, 2014

| New York Knicks | 80–86 | Toronto Raptors |

(Canada) Bell Centre, Montreal

=== 2015 ===
October 4, 2015

| Los Angeles Clippers | 73–93 | Toronto Raptors |

(Canada) Rogers Arena, Vancouver

October 10, 2015

| Chicago Bulls | 114–105 | Minnesota Timberwolves |

(Canada) MTS Centre, Winnipeg

October 14, 2015

| Toronto Raptors | 87–89 | Minnesota Timberwolves |

(Canada) Canadian Tire Centre, Ottawa

October 23, 2015

| Washington Wizards | 82–92 | Toronto Raptors |

(Canada) Bell Centre, Montreal

=== 2016 ===
October 1, 2016

| Golden State Warriors | 93–97 | Toronto Raptors |

(Canada) Rogers Arena, Vancouver

October 3, 2016

| Denver Nuggets | 108–106 | Toronto Raptors |

(Canada) Scotiabank Saddledome, Calgary

=== 2018 ===
September 29, 2018

| Portland Trail Blazers | 104–122 | Toronto Raptors |

(Canada) Rogers Arena, Vancouver

October 10, 2018

| Brooklyn Nets | 91–118 | Toronto Raptors |

(Canada) Bell Centre, Montreal

=== 2019 ===
October 17, 2019

| Los Angeles Clippers | 87–102 | Dallas Mavericks |

(Canada) Rogers Arena, Vancouver

=== 2022 ===
October 2, 2022

| Utah Jazz | 82–114 | Toronto Raptors |

(Canada) Rogers Place, Edmonton

October 14, 2022

| Boston Celtics | 134–137 | Toronto Raptors |

(Canada) Bell Centre, Montreal

=== 2023 ===
October 8, 2023

| Sacramento Kings | 99–112 | Toronto Raptors |

(Canada) Rogers Arena, Vancouver

October 12, 2023

| Detroit Pistons | 128–125 | Oklahoma City Thunder |

(Canada) Bell Centre, Montreal

=== 2024 ===
October 6, 2024

| Washington Wizards | 98–125 | Toronto Raptors |

(Canada) Bell Centre, Montreal

=== 2025 ===
October 6, 2025

| Denver Nuggets | 112–108 | Toronto Raptors |

(Canada) Rogers Arena, Vancouver

=== 2026 ===
October 3, 2026

| Miami Heat | 129–105 | Toronto Raptors |

(Canada) Centre Vidéotron, Quebec City

October 10, 2026

| Los Angeles Clippers | 106–114 | Toronto Raptors |

(Canada) Rogers Arena, Vancouver

== See also ==
- NBA Global Games
- List of games played between NBA and international teams
- NBA versus EuroLeague games
- McDonald's Championship
- EuroLeague American Tour
- Naismith Cup
