= NBA versus EuroLeague games =

Exhibition game series

The following is a list of NBA versus EuroLeague games. The list includes only games in which NBA clubs have played against teams that participated in that same upcoming season's top-tier level EuroLeague competition. The first game was played in the year 1978, by the defending NBA champion, the Washington Bullets, and Maccabi Tel Aviv, prior to the 1978–79 basketball season.

== Rules ==
- FIBA era (1978–1999):

The games between NBA and FIBA EuroLeague teams, that took place between 1978 and 1999, were played under a set of mixed FIBA and NBA rules.

- EuroLeague Basketball era (2003–present):

The games that take place in the United States and Canada, are played under NBA rules, and with three NBA refs. The games that take place outside of the United States and Canada, are played under NBA rules, with two NBA refs and one EuroLeague ref.

== Statistical records of NBA teams against EuroLeague teams ==
=== Records by game rules ===
- FIBA era (1978–1999):
  - NBA teams had a record of 23–4 against FIBA EuroLeague teams, during the FIBA era, when the games were played under a set of mixed NBA and FIBA rules.
- Euroleague Basketball era (2003–present):
  - NBA teams have a combined record of 52–14 against EuroLeague teams, since 2003, playing under NBA rules.
  - NBA teams have a record of 36–4, when playing the games at home, under NBA rules, and with three NBA refs.
  - NBA teams have a record of 16–10, when playing the games away, under NBA rules, with two NBA refs and one EuroLeague ref.
- NBA teams have an overall record of 75–17 against EuroLeague teams.

=== Records by decade ===
- 1970s (mixed rules):
  - FIBA EuroLeague teams had a record of 1–0 against NBA teams.
- 1980s (mixed rules):
  - NBA teams had a record of 8–3 against FIBA EuroLeague teams.
- 1990s (mixed rules):
  - NBA teams had a record of 15–0 against EuroLeague teams.
- 2000s (NBA rules):
  - NBA teams had a record of 32–5 against EuroLeague teams.
- 2010s (NBA rules):
  - NBA teams had a record of 20–8 against EuroLeague teams.
- 2020s (NBA rules):
  - EuroLeague teams have a record of 1–0 against NBA teams.

== Game results, FIBA era (1978–1999) ==
This is a list of NBA versus FIBA EuroLeague games, during the FIBA era, when the FIBA EuroLeague was run by FIBA Europe, from the inaugural 1958 FIBA European Champions Cup season, to the 2000–01 FIBA SuproLeague season. The list includes only games in which NBA clubs have played against teams that participated in that same upcoming season's top-tier level FIBA EuroLeague competition. The first game was played in the year 1978, prior to the 1978–79 basketball season. The games between NBA and FIBA EuroLeague teams, that took place between 1978 and 1999, were played under a set of mixed FIBA and NBA rules.

Games played under mixed NBA and FIBA rules:

=== 1970s ===
September 7, 1978

Washington Bullets (United States)	97–98	(Israel) Maccabi Tel Aviv

(Israel) Yad Eliyahu Arena, Tel Aviv

=== 1980s ===
September 29th, 1981

Philadelphia 76ers (United States)	112–114	(Israel) Maccabi Tel Aviv

(Israel) Yad Eliyahu Arena, Tel Aviv

August 28, 1984

New Jersey Nets (United States)	97–104	(Israel) Maccabi Tel Aviv

(Israel) Yad Eliyahu Arena, Tel Aviv

August 30, 1984

Phoenix Suns (United States)	98–113	(Israel) Maccabi Tel Aviv

(Israel) Yad Eliyahu Arena, Tel Aviv

August 31, 1984

Seattle SuperSonics (United States)	111–110	(Switzerland) Vevey

(Switzerland) Vevey

September 7, 1984

New Jersey Nets (United States)	142–106	(Italy) Granarolo Bologna

(Italy) Palazzo dello Sport di Piazza Azzarita, Bologna

September 9, 1984

Phoenix Suns (United States)	121–87	(Italy) Granarolo Bologna

(Italy) Palazzo dello Sport Lino Oldrini, Varese

October 23, 1987

Milwaukee Bucks (United States)	123–111	(Italy) Tracer Milano

(United States) The MECCA, Milwaukee

October 9, 1988

Philadelphia 76ers (United States)	108–107	(Israel) Maccabi Tel Aviv

(United States) The Spectrum, Philadelphia

October 12, 1989

Miami Heat (United States)	101–95	(Israel) Maccabi Tel Aviv

(United States) Miami Arena, Miami

October 20, 1989

Denver Nuggets (United States)	137–103	(Spain) FC Barcelona Banca Catalana

(Italy) PalaEUR, Rome

October 22, 1989

Denver Nuggets (United States)	135–129	(Socialist Federal Republic of Yugoslavia) Jugoplastika

(Italy) PalaEUR, Rome

=== 1990s ===
October 11, 1990

New York Knicks (United States)	119–115 (OT)	(Italy) Scavolini Pesaro

(Spain) Palau Sant Jordi, Barcelona

October 13, 1990

New York Knicks (United States)	117–101	(Socialist Federal Republic of Yugoslavia) POP 84

(Spain) Palau Sant Jordi, Barcelona

October 16, 1990

Los Angeles Lakers (United States)	129–106	(Israel) Maccabi Tel Aviv

(United States) The Forum, Inglewood

October 19, 1991

Los Angeles Lakers (United States)	116–114	(Spain) Montigalà Joventut

(France) Palais Omnisports de Paris-Bercy, Paris

October 24, 1991

Los Angeles Clippers (United States)	146–112	(Israel) Maccabi Tel Aviv

(United States) San Diego Sports Arena, San Diego

October 27, 1991

Los Angeles Clippers (United States)	98–93	(Israel) Maccabi Tel Aviv

(United States) LA Memorial Sports Arena, Los Angeles

October 22, 1993

Phoenix Suns (United States)	145–115	(Spain) Real Madrid Teka

(Germany) Olympiahalle, Munich

October 23, 1993

Phoenix Suns (United States)	112–90	(Italy) Buckler Beer Bologna

(Germany) Olympiahalle, Munich

October 20, 1994

Golden State Warriors (United States)	122–104	(Spain) 7up Joventut

(Spain) Pavelló Olímpic de Badalona, Badalona

October 21, 1994

Charlotte Hornets (United States)	114–107	(Italy) Buckler Beer Bologna

(Italy) PalaMalaguti, Casalecchio di Reno

October 21, 1995

Houston Rockets (United States)	126–112	(Italy) Buckler Beer Bologna

(United Kingdom) London Arena, London

October 17, 1997

Chicago Bulls (United States)	89–82	(France) PSG Racing

(France) Palais Omnisports de Paris-Bercy, Paris

October 18, 1997

Chicago Bulls (United States)	104–78	(Greece) Olympiacos

(France) Palais Omnisports de Paris-Bercy, Paris

October 11, 1999

Miami Heat (United States)	126–91	(Israel) Maccabi Tel Aviv

(Israel) Yad Eliyahu Arena, Tel Aviv

October 15, 1999

San Antonio Spurs (United States)	96–86	(Italy) Varese Roosters

(Italy) Fila Forum, Assago

== Game results, EuroLeague Basketball era (2003–present) ==
This is a list of NBA versus EuroLeague games during the EuroLeague Basketball era, since the EuroLeague has been run by EuroLeague Basketball, beginning with the EuroLeague 2000–01 season. The list includes only games in which NBA clubs have played against teams that participated in that same upcoming season's top-tier level EuroLeague competition. The first games were played in the year 2003, prior to the 2003–04 basketball season. The games that take place in the United States and Canada are played under NBA rules, and with three NBA refs. The games that take place outside of the United States and Canada are played under NBA rules, with two NBA refs and one EuroLeague ref.

Games played under NBA rules:

=== 2000s ===
October 10, 2003

Memphis Grizzlies (United States)	91–80	(Spain) FC Barcelona

(Spain) Palau Sant Jordi, Barcelona

October 10, 2003

Toronto Raptors (Canada)	100–76	(Greece) Panathinaikos

Air Canada Centre, Toronto

October 20, 2004

Toronto Raptors (Canada)	86–83	(Italy) Benetton Treviso

Air Canada Centre, Toronto

October 16, 2005

Toronto Raptors (Canada)	103–105	(Israel) Maccabi Tel Aviv

Air Canada Centre, Toronto

October 19, 2005

Orlando Magic (United States)	93–79	(Israel) Maccabi Tel Aviv

(United States) TD Waterhouse Centre, Orlando

October 5, 2006

Boxscore

Philadelphia 76ers (United States)	99–104	(Spain) Winterthur FC Barcelona

(Spain) Palau Sant Jordi, Barcelona

October 6, 2006

Boxscore

Phoenix Suns (United States)	100–93	(Italy) Lottomatica Roma

(Italy) PalaLottomatica, Rome

October 7, 2006

Boxscore

Los Angeles Clippers (United States)	75–94	(Russia) CSKA Moscow

(Russia) CSKA Universal Sports Hall, Moscow

October 8, 2006

Boxscore

San Antonio Spurs (United States)	97–84	(Israel) Maccabi Tel Aviv

(France) Palais Omnisports de Paris-Bercy, Paris

October 10, 2006

Boxscore

Denver Nuggets (United States)	118–102	(Turkey) Efes Pilsen

(United States) Pepsi Center, Denver

October 11, 2006

Boxscore

Phoenix Suns (United States)	119–102	(Israel) Maccabi Tel Aviv

(Germany) Kölnarena, Cologne

October 11, 2006

Boxscore

Philadelphia 76ers (United States)	85–71	(Russia) CSKA Moscow

(Germany) Kölnarena, Cologne

October 12, 2006

Boxscore

Golden State Warriors (United States)	120–66	(Turkey) Efes Pilsen

(United States) Oracle Arena, Oakland

October 17, 2006

Boxscore

Cleveland Cavaliers (United States)	93–67	(Israel) Maccabi Tel Aviv

(United States) Quicken Loans Arena, Cleveland

October 19, 2006

Boxscore

Toronto Raptors (Canada)	118–84	(Israel) Maccabi Tel Aviv

Air Canada Centre, Toronto

October 6, 2007

Boxscore

Minnesota Timberwolves (United States)	84–81	(Turkey) Efes Pilsen

(Turkey) Abdi İpekçi Arena, Istanbul

October 7, 2007

Boxscore

Toronto Raptors (Canada)	93–87	(Italy) Lottomatica Roma

(Italy) PalaLottomatica, Rome

October 9, 2007

Boxscore

Memphis Grizzlies (United States)	99–102	(Spain) Unicaja

(Spain) Palacio José María Martín Carpena, Málaga

October 11, 2007

Boxscore

Toronto Raptors (Canada)	103–104	(Spain) Real Madrid

(Spain) Palacio de Deportes, Madrid

October 11, 2007

Boxscore

New York Knicks (United States)	112–85	(Israel) Maccabi Tel Aviv

(United States) Madison Square Garden, New York City

October 11, 2007

Boxscore

Houston Rockets (United States)	107–70	(Greece) Panathinaikos

(United States) Toyota Center, Houston

October 13, 2007

Boxscore

San Antonio Spurs (United States)	113–91	(Greece) Panathinaikos

(United States) AT&T Center, San Antonio

October 15, 2007

Boxscore

Golden State Warriors (United States)	107–88	(Lithuania) Žalgiris

(United States) Oracle Arena, Oakland

October 17, 2007

Boxscore

Toronto Raptors (Canada)	105–99	(Lithuania) Žalgiris

Air Canada Centre, Toronto

October 19, 2007

Boxscore

Washington Wizards (United States)	115–96	(Lithuania) Žalgiris

(United States) Verizon Center, Washington, D.C.

October 10, 2008

Boxscore

Orlando Magic (United States)	94–66	(Russia) CSKA Moscow

(United States) Amway Arena, Orlando

October 14, 2008

Boxscore

Toronto Raptors (Canada)	86–78	(Russia) CSKA Moscow

Air Canada Centre, Toronto

October 18, 2008

Boxscore

Los Angeles Lakers (United States)	108–104	(Spain) Regal FC Barcelona

(United States) Staples Center, Los Angeles

October 19, 2008

Boxscore

Los Angeles Clippers (United States)	114–109	(Spain) Regal FC Barcelona

(United States) Staples Center, Los Angeles

October 21, 2008

Boxscore

Golden State Warriors (United States)	126–106	(Lithuania) Lietuvos Rytas

(United States) Oracle Arena, Oakland

October 3, 2009

Boxscore

Denver Nuggets (United States)	102–70	(Serbia) Partizan

(United States) Pepsi Center, Denver

October 6, 2009

Boxscore

Phoenix Suns (United States)	111–80	(Serbia) Partizan

(United States) US Airways Center, Phoenix, Arizona

October 8, 2009

Boxscore

Utah Jazz (United States)	109–87	(Spain) Real Madrid

(Spain) Palacio de Deportes, Madrid

October 9, 2009

Boxscore

San Antonio Spurs (United States)	107–89	(Greece) Olympiacos

(United States) AT&T Center, San Antonio

October 12, 2009

Boxscore

Cleveland Cavaliers (United States)	111–94	(Greece) Olympiacos

(United States) Quicken Loans Arena, Cleveland

October 18, 2009

Boxscore

New York Knicks (United States)	106–91	(Israel) Maccabi Tel Aviv

(United States) Madison Square Garden, New York City

October 20, 2009

Boxscore

Los Angeles Clippers (United States)	108–96	(Israel) Maccabi Tel Aviv

(United States) Staples Center, Los Angeles

=== 2010s ===
October 3, 2010

Boxscore

New York Knicks (United States)	125–113	(Italy) Armani Jeans Milano

(Italy) Mediolanum Forum, Assago

October 7, 2010

Boxscore

Los Angeles Lakers (United States)	88–92	(Spain) Regal FC Barcelona

(Spain) Palau Sant Jordi, Barcelona

October 12, 2010

Boxscore

Miami Heat (United States)	96–85	(Russia) CSKA Moscow

(United States) American Airlines Arena, Miami

October 14, 2010

Boxscore

Memphis Grizzlies (United States)	110–105	(Spain) Caja Laboral

(United States) FedExForum, Memphis

October 14, 2010

Boxscore

Oklahoma City Thunder (United States)	97–89	(Russia) CSKA Moscow

(United States) Ford Center, Oklahoma City

October 16, 2010

Boxscore

San Antonio Spurs (United States)	108–85	(Spain) Caja Laboral

(United States) AT&T Center, San Antonio

October 16, 2010

Boxscore

Cleveland Cavaliers (United States)	87–90	(Russia) CSKA Moscow

(United States) Quicken Loans Arena, Cleveland

October 5, 2012

Boxscore

Boston Celtics (United States)	91–97	(Turkey) Fenerbahçe Ülker

(Turkey) Ülker Sports Arena, Istanbul

October 6, 2012

Boxscore

Dallas Mavericks (United States)	89–84	(Germany) Alba Berlin

(Germany) O2 World, Berlin

October 6, 2012

Boxscore

Memphis Grizzlies (United States)	105–93	(Spain) Real Madrid

(United States) FedExForum, Memphis

October 6, 2012

Boxscore

San Antonio Spurs (United States)	106–77	(Italy) Montepaschi Siena

(United States) AT&T Center, San Antonio

October 7, 2012

Boxscore

Boston Celtics (United States)	105–75	(Italy) EA7 Emporio Armani Milano

(Italy) Mediolanum Forum, Assago

October 8, 2012

Boxscore

Toronto Raptors (Canada)	102–95	(Spain) Real Madrid

Air Canada Centre, Toronto

October 8, 2012

Boxscore

Cleveland Cavaliers (United States)	91–85	(Italy) Montepaschi Siena

(United States) Quicken Loans Arena, Cleveland

October 9, 2012

Boxscore

Dallas Mavericks (United States)	85–99	(Spain) FC Barcelona Regal

(Spain) Palau Sant Jordi, Barcelona

October 5, 2013

Boxscore

Oklahoma City Thunder (United States)	95–82	(Turkey) Fenerbahçe Ülker

(Turkey) Ülker Sports Arena, Istanbul

October 7, 2013

Boxscore

Minnesota Timberwolves (United States)	106–108	(Russia) CSKA Moscow

(United States) Target Center, Minneapolis

October 9, 2013

Boxscore

San Antonio Spurs (United States)	95–93	(Russia) CSKA Moscow

(United States) AT&T Center, San Antonio

October 5, 2014

Boxscore

Cleveland Cavaliers (United States)	107–80	(Israel) Maccabi Tel Aviv

(United States) Quicken Loans Arena, Cleveland

October 7, 2014

Boxscore

Brooklyn Nets (United States)	111–94	(Israel) Maccabi Tel Aviv

(United States) Barclays Center, New York City

October 8, 2014

Boxscore

San Antonio Spurs (United States)	93–94	(Germany) Alba Berlin

(Germany) O2 World, Berlin

October 11, 2014

Boxscore

San Antonio Spurs (United States)	96–90	(Turkey) Fenerbahçe Ülker

(Turkey) Ülker Sports Arena, Istanbul

October 5, 2015

Boxscore

Brooklyn Nets (United States)	96–101	(Turkey) Fenerbahçe

(United States) Barclays Center, New York City

October 6, 2015

Boxscore

Boston Celtics (United States)	124–91	(Italy) EA7 Emporio Armani Milano

(Italy) Mediolanum Forum, Assago

October 8, 2015

Boxscore

Boston Celtics (United States)	111–96	(Spain) Real Madrid

(Spain) Barclaycard Center, Madrid

October 9, 2015

Boxscore

Oklahoma City Thunder (United States)	111–81	(Turkey) Fenerbahçe

(United States) Chesapeake Energy Arena, Oklahoma City

October 3, 2016

Boxscore

Oklahoma City Thunder (United States)	137–142	(Spain) Real Madrid

(Spain) Barclaycard Center, Madrid

October 5, 2016

Boxscore

Oklahoma City Thunder (United States)	92–89	(Spain) FC Barcelona Lassa

(Spain) Palau Sant Jordi, Barcelona

=== 2020s ===
October 10, 2023

Dallas Mavericks (United States)	123–127	(Spain) Real Madrid

(Spain) WiZink Center, Madrid

== NBA vs. EuroLeague games involving the league champions ==
The following is a list of games that have been played between NBA and EuroLeague teams, in which at least one of the leagues was represented by its defending league champion. The NBA has a record of 19–6 against the EuroLeague in these games.

September 8, 1978

Washington Bullets (United States) (NBA Champions)	97–98	(Israel) Maccabi Tel Aviv

(Israel) Yad Eliyahu Arena, Tel Aviv

October 23, 1987

Milwaukee Bucks (United States)	123–111	(Italy) Olimpia Milano (EuroLeague champions)

(United States) The MECCA, Milwaukee

October 22, 1989

Denver Nuggets (United States)	135–129	(Socialist Federal Republic of Yugoslavia) Split (EuroLeague champions)

(Italy) PalaEUR, Rome

October 13, 1990

New York Knicks (United States)	117–101	(Socialist Federal Republic of Yugoslavia) Split (EuroLeague champions)

(Spain) Palau Sant Jordi, Barcelona

October 20, 1994

Golden State Warriors (United States)	122–104	(Spain) Joventut Badalona (EuroLeague champions)

(Spain) Pavelló Olímpic de Badalona, Badalona

October 21, 1995

Houston Rockets (United States) (NBA Champions)	126–112	(Italy) Virtus Bologna

(England) London Arena, London

October 17, 1997

Chicago Bulls (United States) (NBA Champions)	89–82	(France) PSG Racing

(France) Palais Omnisports de Paris-Bercy, Paris

October 18, 1997

Chicago Bulls (United States) (NBA champions)	104–78	(Greece) Olympiacos Piraeus (EuroLeague champions)

(France) Palais Omnisports, Paris

October 15, 1999

San Antonio Spurs (United States) (NBA champions)	96–86	(Italy) Varese

(Italy) Fila Forum, Assago

October 10, 2003

Report

Memphis Grizzlies (United States)	91–80	(Spain) Barça (EuroLeague champions)

(Spain) Palau Sant Jordi, Barcelona

October 16, 2005

Toronto Raptors (Canada)	103–105	(Israel) Maccabi Tel Aviv (EuroLeague champions)

Air Canada Centre, Toronto

October 19, 2005

Orlando Magic (United States)	93–79	(Israel) Maccabi Tel Aviv (EuroLeague champions)

(United States) TD Waterhouse Centre, Orlando

October 7, 2006

Boxscore

Los Angeles Clippers (United States)	75–94	(Russia) CSKA Moscow (EuroLeague champions)

(Russia) CSKA Universal Sports Hall, Moscow

October 11, 2006

Boxscore

Philadelphia 76ers (United States)	85–71	(Russia) CSKA Moscow (EuroLeague champions)

(Germany) Kölnarena, Cologne

October 11, 2007

Boxscore

Houston Rockets (United States)	107–70	(Greece) Panathinaikos Athens (EuroLeague champions)

(United States) Toyota Center, Houston

October 13, 2007

Boxscore

San Antonio Spurs (United States) (NBA champions)	113–91	(Greece) Panathinaikos Athens (EuroLeague champions)

(United States) AT&T Center, San Antonio

October 10, 2008

Boxscore

Orlando Magic (United States)	94–66	(Russia) CSKA Moscow (EuroLeague champions)

(United States) Amway Arena, Orlando

October 14, 2008

Boxscore

Toronto Raptors (Canada)	86–78	(Russia) CSKA Moscow (EuroLeague champions)

Air Canada Centre, Toronto

October 7, 2010

Boxscore

Los Angeles Lakers (United States) (NBA champions)	88–92	(Spain) Barça (EuroLeague champions)

(Spain) Palau Sant Jordi, Barcelona

October 5, 2014

Boxscore

Cleveland Cavaliers (United States)	107–80	(Israel) Maccabi Tel Aviv (EuroLeague champions)

(United States) Quicken Loans Arena, Cleveland

October 7, 2014

Boxscore

Brooklyn Nets (United States)	111–94	(Israel) Maccabi Tel Aviv (EuroLeague champions)

(United States) Barclays Center, New York City

October 8, 2014

Boxscore

San Antonio Spurs (United States) (NBA champions)	93–94	(Germany) Alba Berlin

(Germany) O2 World, Berlin

October 11, 2014

Boxscore

San Antonio Spurs (United States) (NBA champions)	96–90	(Turkey) Fenerbahçe İstanbul

(Turkey) Ülker Sports Arena, Istanbul

October 8, 2015

Boxscore

Boston Celtics (United States)	111–96	(Spain) Real Madrid (EuroLeague champions)

(Spain) Barclaycard Center, Madrid

October 10, 2023

Boxscore

Dallas Mavericks (United States)	123–127	(Spain) Real Madrid (EuroLeague champions)

(Spain) WiZink Center, Madrid

== NBA champions vs. EuroLeague champions ==
The following is a list of games that have been played between the defending champions of the NBA, and the defending champions of the EuroLeague. The NBA has a record of 2–1 against the EuroLeague in these games.

October 18, 1997

Chicago Bulls (United States) (NBA Champions)	104–78	(Greece) Olympiacos Piraeus (EuroLeague champions)

(France) Palais Omnisports de Paris-Bercy, Paris

October 13, 2007

Boxscore

San Antonio Spurs (United States) (NBA Champions)	113–91	(Greece) Panathinaikos Athens (EuroLeague champions)

(United States) AT&T Center, San Antonio

October 7, 2010

Boxscore

Los Angeles Lakers (United States) (NBA Champions)	88–92	(Spain) Barça (EuroLeague champions)

(Spain) Palau Sant Jordi, Barcelona

== See also ==
- NBA Global Games
- NBA Canada Series
- List of games played between NBA and international teams
- McDonald's Championship
- EuroLeague American Tour
