= LNB All-Star Game (Argentina) =

- Status: Active
- Frequency: Annually
- Inaugurated: 1988
- Most recent: 2025
- Organizer: LNB

The LNB All-Star Game is the All-Star Game of the professional Argentine Basketball League, the Liga Nacional de Básquetbol (LNB). The game is held once every year. It started in 1988.

The rosters for the All-Star Game are chosen by an online voting.

== History ==
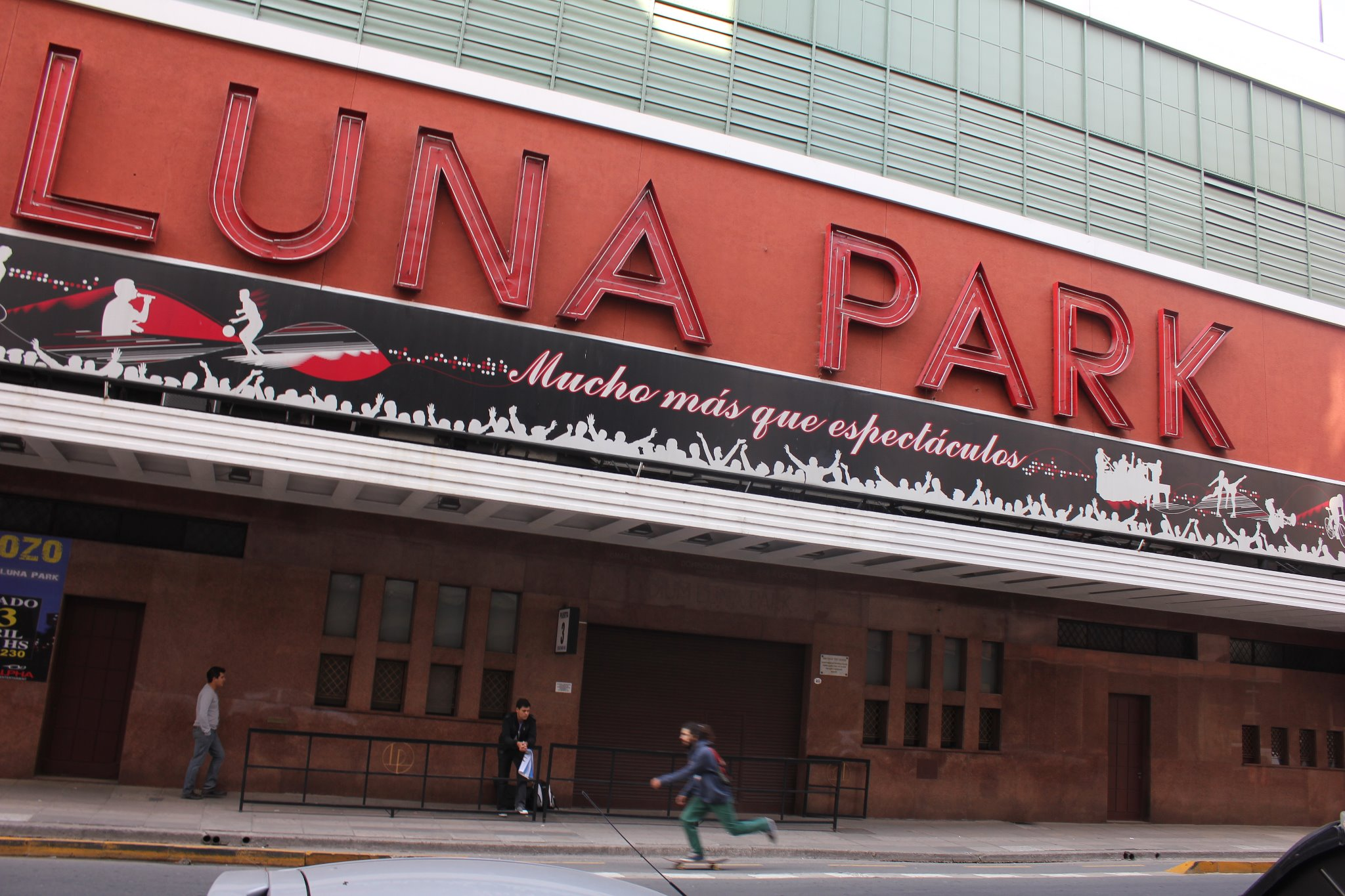
The iconic Luna Park venue hosted the event twice

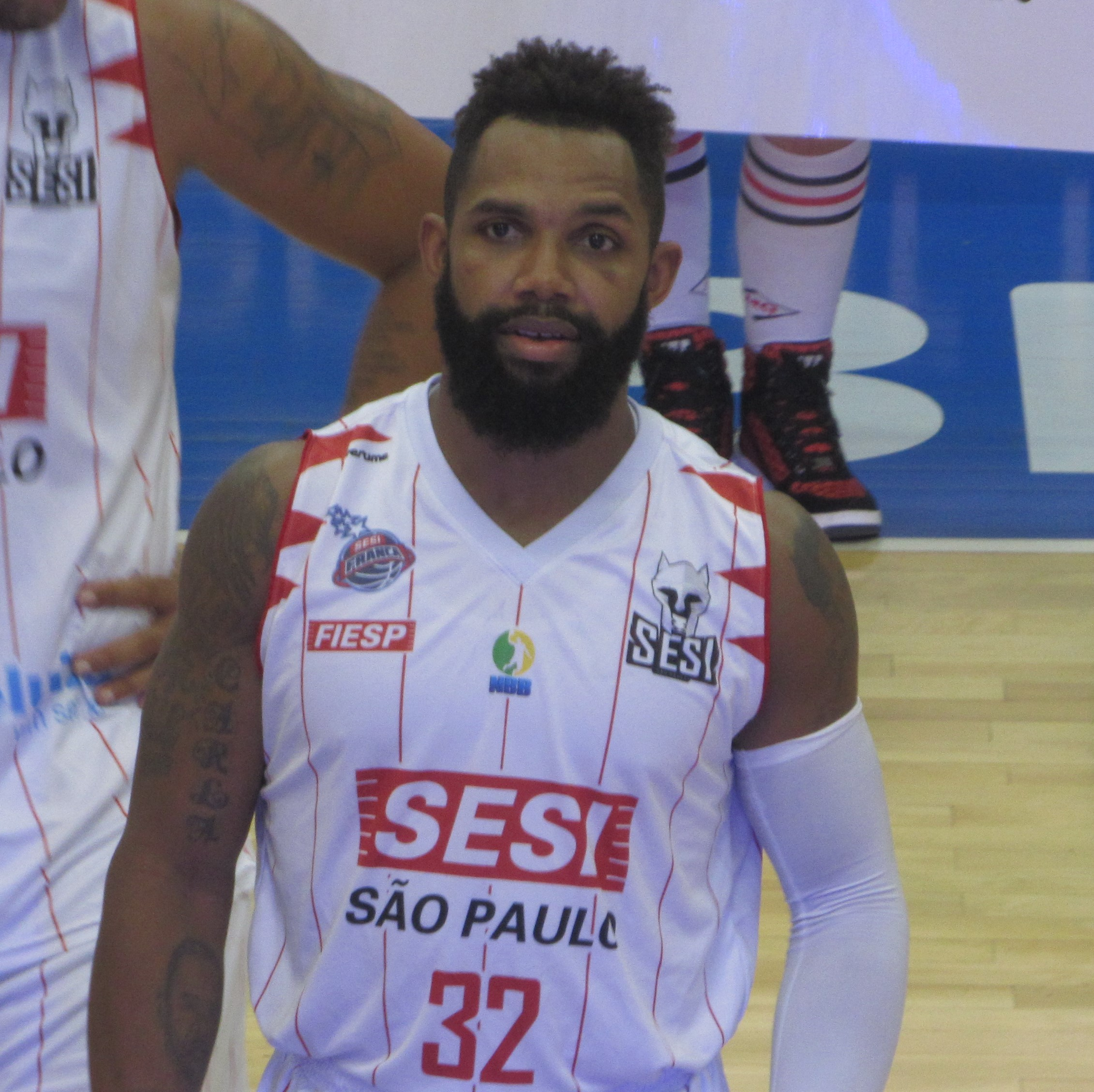
David Jackson was the MVP of the 2013 edition

The All-Star Game was played for the first time on January 30, 1988. It was held at the Mar del Plata Superdome packed with 3,120 spectators. The Blue team (Azul) defeated the White team (Bianco) 112 to 92, and Luis Villar was named the MVP. That first edition also featured the Dunk Tournament and the Three-Point Tournament.

On December 17, 1990, the first All-Star Game was played in Estadio Luna Park, where the White Team defeated the Red Team 104 to 88. In that edition, Julio Ariel Rodríguez was chosen as the MVP in a game that also featured legendary Héctor Campana and Marcelo Milanesio among others.

In 1992, a new era began in the game; now, the teams would be composed of players from the North and South zones of the LNB. In 1993 the game was held in front of 3.500 spectators at the Microestadio Antonio Rotili. This period (North and South selections) lasted for nine editions with the North recording seven wins.

The event wasn't played in 1994, but the following year it returned, at the Ruca Che Stadium in Neuquén, in front of 3,600 spectators, where the South won for the first time. This year also marked the beginning of NBA mascot invitations to the game, with The Gorilla of the Phoenix Suns among them.

In 1999 Néstor García's South beat Ruben Magnano's North in one of the best games.

The event was cancelled in 2020, due to the COVID-19, but it returned in 2021, with the invitation of female players and retired male players this time. The slam-dunk contest was abandoned after the 2019 edition.

== Format ==
Initially there was an All-Star match between two selections and the contests. However, the fourteenth edition in 2002 presented a different format: a quadrangular tournament was played between two LNB teams (top division) and two TNA teams (second division). The game was played outdoors for the first time, in the open-air, in a specially set-up structure in Villa Carlos Paz. The Bordeaux team of LNB players, defeated the Azul team, made up of TNA players, in front of 9,000 people.

This 4-team format of 40 All-Stars lasted until the 2007 edition. In 2009, the Legends Game was played for the first time, a match in which the teams were made up of players who had already retired from the sport. The 2009 edition was the most attended one, with 14,200 spectators.

== Results ==
Year	Score	Venue and location	MVP
I 1988	Azul 112; Blanco 92	Superdomo (Mar del Plata)	(Argentina) Luis Villar (River Plate)
II; 1989	Azul 113; Blanco 100	Polideportivo Carlos Cerutti (Córdoba)	(Argentina) Luis Villar (River Plate)
III; 1990	Blanco 104; Rojo 88	Luna Park (Capital Federal)	(Argentina) Julio Rodríguez (Gimnasia (Pergamino))
IV; 1991	Azul 102; Rojo 99	Estadio Osvaldo Casanova (Bahía Blanca)	(Argentina) Esteban De la Fuente (Independiente (N))
V 1992	Norte 121; Sur 110	Club Juventud (Santiago del Estero)	(Argentina) Héctor Campana (Atenas)
VI; 1993	Norte 123; Sur 106	Microestadio Antonio Rotili (Lanús)	(Argentina) Héctor Campana (Olimpia (VT))
1994	not held		
VII; 1995	Sur 100; Norte 96	Estadio Ruca Che (Neuquén)	(Argentina) Hernán Montenegro (Agente libre)
VIII; 1996	Norte 112; Sur 108	Polideportivo Islas Malvinas (Mar del Plata)	(Argentina) Rubén Wolkowyski (Quilmes)
IX; 1997	Norte 98; Sur 96	Polideportivo Islas Malvinas (Mar del Plata)	(Argentina) Héctor Campana (Atenas)
X 1998	Norte 121; Sur 117	Polideportivo Islas Malvinas (Mar del Plata)	Héctor Campana (Atenas)
XI; 1999	Sur 92; Norte 80	Estadio Municipal (Mar del Plata)	(Argentina) Raúl Merlo (Gimnasia (CR))
XII; 2000	Norte 72; Sur 68	Estadio Municipal (Mar del Plata)	(Argentina) Héctor Campana (Atenas)
XIII; 2001	Norte 101; Sur 90	Polideportivo Ave Fénix (San Luis)	(Argentina) Héctor Campana (Boca Juniors)
XIV; 2002	Bordeaux 54; Azul 40	Villa Carlos Paz	(Argentina) Marcelo Milanesio (Atenas)
XV; 2003	Rojo 51; Negro 38	Polideportivo Islas Malvinas (Mar del Plata)	(Argentina) Héctor Campana (Atenas)
XVI; 2004	Extranjeros 104; Nacionales 97	Estadio Luis Butta (Paraná)	(United States) Joshua Pittman (Atenas)
XVII; 2005	Nacionales 111; Extranjeros 104	Polideportivo Islas Malvinas (Mar del Plata)	(Argentina) Paolo Quinteros (Boca Juniors)
XVIII; 2006	Nacionales 92; Extranjeros 89	Polideportivo Islas Malvinas (Mar del Plata)	(Argentina) Leonardo Gutiérrez (Ben Hur)
XIX; 2007	Extranjeros 76; Nacionales 74	Polideportivo Islas Malvinas (Mar del Plata)	(United States) Robert Brown (Quimsa)
XX; 2008	Nacionales 72; Extranjeros 65	Polideportivo Islas Malvinas (Mar del Plata)	(Argentina) Andrés Pelussi (Libertad (S))
XXI; 2009	Blanco 97; Azul 92	Polideportivo Islas Malvinas (Mar del Plata)	(Argentina) Roman Gonzalez (Peñarol)
XXII; 2010	Nacionales 84; Extranjeros 81	Polideportivo Islas Malvinas (Mar del Plata)	(Argentina) Juan Manuel Locatelli (Atenas)
XXIII; 2011	Extranjeros 68; Nacionales 51	Orfeo Superdomo (Córdoba)	(United States) Kyle Lamonte (Peñarol)
XXIV; 2012	Nacionales 87; Extranjeros 78	Polideportivo Islas Malvinas (Mar del Plata)	(Argentina) Paolo Quinteros (Regatas (C))
XXV; 2013	Extranjeros 113; Nacionales 99	Polideportivo Islas Malvinas (Mar del Plata)	(United States) David Jackson (Gimnasia Indalo)
XXVI; 2014	Extranjeros 126; Nacionales 102	Estadio Héctor Etchart (Capital Federal)	(United States) Walter Baxley (Quilmes)
XXVII; 2015	Extranjeros 90; Nacionales 76	Luna Park (Capital Federal)	(United States) Lee Roberts (Ciclista Olímpico)
XXVIII; 2016	Extranjeros 110; Nacionales 107	Polideportivo Víctor Nethol (La Plata)	(United States) Robert Battle (Quimsa)
XXIX; 2017	Equipo Blanco 92; Equipo Azul 83	Polideportivo Roberto Pando (Capital Federal)	(Argentina) Facundo Campazzo ( (Spain) Real Madrid)
XXX; 2018	Equipo Blanco 110; Equipo Negro 98	Polideportivo Roberto Pando (Capital Federal)	(Argentina) Facundo Campazzo ( (Spain) Real Madrid)
XXXI; 2019	Equipo Blanco 60; Equipo Azul 58	Microestadio Antonio Rotili (Lanús)	(Argentina) Mariano Fierro (Ferro)
2020	not held		
XXXII; 2021	Equipo Blanco 84; Equipo Negro 66	Polideportivo Roberto Pando (Capital Federal)	(Argentina) Florencia Chagas (Empoli Ladies)
XXXIII; 2022	Equipo Blanco 70; Equipo Negro 60	Estadio La Pedrera (Villa Mercedes)	(Argentina) Héctor Campana (retired)
XXXIV; 2023	Equipo Rojo 63; Equipo Blanco 54	Estadio Héctor Etchart (Capital Federal)	(Argentina) Selem Safar (Centauros de Portuguesa)
XXXIV; 2024	Equipo Blanco 58; Equipo Azul 57	Espacio DAM (Zárate)	(Argentina) Paolo Quinteros (retired)
XXXV; 2025	Equipo Blanco 42; Equipo Negro 54	Antonio Rotili Stadium (Lanús )	(Argentina) Walter Herrmann (retired)

=== Players with most MVP awards ===
Player	Wins	Editions
(Argentina) Héctor Campana	8	1992, 1993, 1997, 1998, 2000, 2001, 2003, 2022
(Argentina) Paolo Quinteros	3	2005, 2012, 2024
(Argentina) Facundo Campazzo	2	2017, 2018
(Argentina) Luis Villar	2	1988, 1989

== Score sheets (2004-2025) ==
- 16th All-Star Game 2003-04:

DATE:
VENUE: Estadio Luis Butta, Paraná
SCORE: Nacional All-Stars - Imports All-Stars 97-104

Nacional All-Stars : Facundo Sucatzky 5, Paolo Quinteros 22, Juan Manuel Locatelli 4, Leonardo Gutierrez 13, Diego Osella 4; Diego Prego 18, Claudio Chiappero 4, Sebastian Festa 0, Hector Campana 9, Martin Leiva 18. Coach: Sergio Hernandez.

Imports All-Stars: Lawrence Wallace 16, Josh Pittman 22, David Scott 12, Dwigth McCray 9, Patrick Savoy 12; Charles Jones 3, Jose Vargas 7, Byron Wilson 5, Lazaro Borrell 3, Evric Gray 15. Coach: Nestor Garcia

- 17th All-Star Game 2004-05:

DATE: 24–25 January 2005
VENUE: Polideportivo Islas Malvinas, Mar del Plata
SCORE: Nacional All-Stars - Imports All-Stars 92-89

Nacional All-Stars : Facundo Sucatzky, Sebastian Ginobili, Paolo Quinteros, Julio Mazzaro, Juan Manuel Locatelli, Carlos Matías Sandes, Leonardo Gutierrez, Roberto Lopez, Diego Osella, Martin Leiva. Coach: Julio Lamas

Imports All-Stars: Javier Martinez (PAR), Ryan Carroll, Byron Wilson, Joshua Pittman, Victor Thomas, Dwight McCray, Lazaro Borrell, Williard Ford, Raheim Brown, Carlos Strong. Coach: Sergio Hernandez.

- 19th All-Star Game 2006-07:

DATE: 22–23 January 2007
VENUE: Polideportivo Islas Malvinas, Mar del Plata
SCORE: Nacional All-Stars - Imports All-Stars 74-76

Nacional All-Stars : Sebastian Ginobili, Bruno Lábaque, Diego García, Julio Mazzaro, Leandro Masieri, Diego Cavaco, Gabriel Mikulas, Leonardo Gutierrez, Diego Osella, Martin Leiva. Coach: Oscar Sanchez (Quilmes)

Imports All-Stars: Charles Jones, Javier Martinez (PAR), Cleotis Brown, Stalin Ortiz, Lazaro Borrell, Josh Pittman, Robert Brown, Jason Osborne, Chuck Robinson, Tyler Field. Coach: Julio Lamas (Ben Hur)

- 20th All-Star Game 2007-08:

DATE: 28–29 January 2008
VENUE: Polideportivo Islas Malvinas, Mar del Plata
SCORE: Nacional All-Stars - Imports All-Stars 72-65

Nacional All-Stars : Sebastian Ginobili 3, Sebastian Acosta 6, Juan Manuel Locatelli 10, Leonardo Gutierrez 8, Roman Gonzalez 10 (starters); Andres Pelussi 14, Bruno Lábaque 11, Julio Mazzaro 5, Leandro Palladino 3, Diego García 2. Coach: Julio Lamas (Libertad Sunchales)

Imports All-Stars: Charles Jones 0, Antwon Hall 22, Cleotis Brown 2, Chuck Robinson 3, Robert Battle 12 (starters); Quincy Wadley 13, Byron Johnson 6, Michael Robinson 2, Jason Osborne 2, Jamal Robinson 3. Coach: Silvio Jose Santander

- 21st All-Star Game 2008-09:

DATE: 26–27 January 2009
VENUE: Polideportivo Islas Malvinas, Mar del Plata
SCORE: White Team - Blue Team 97-92

White Team : Bruno Lábaque 8, Juan Espil 14, Federico Kammerichs 9, Leonardo Gutierrez 3, Roman Gonzalez 20 (starters); Pablo Sebastian Rodriguez 10, Andre Laws 7, Maximiliano Maciel 3, Jason Osborne 13, Diego García 8, Mauro Cerone (invited) 2. Coach: Ruben Magnano (Atenas Córdoba)

Blue Team: Sebastian Ginobili 11, Sebastian Acosta 13, Juan Manuel Locatelli 10, Gabriel Mikulas 4, Edward Nelson 15 (starters); Diego Alba 2, Julio Mazzaro 6, Federico Marin 7, Byron Johnson 9, Gabriel Fernandez 11, Ezequiel Sosa (invited) 4. Coach: Sergio Hernandez (Peñarol de Mar del Plata)

- 22nd All-Star Game 2009-10:

DATE: 25–26 January 2010
VENUE: Polideportivo Islas Malvinas, Mar del Plata, att:14.000
SCORE: Nacional All-Stars - Imports All-Stars 84-81

Nacional All-Stars : Lucas Victoriano, Juan Espil, Marcos Mata, Leonardo Gutiérrez, Roman Gonzalez (starters); Pablo Sebastián Rodríguez, Bruno Lábaque, Julio Mazzaro, Juan Manuel Locatelli, Andrés Pelussi, Diego Lo Grippo, Rubén Wolkowyski, Diego Osella, Diego García, Federico Kammerichs (DNP). Coach: Carlos Romano (Quimsa)*

Imports All-Stars: Andre Laws, David Jackson, Laron Profit, Jamaal Levy, Derrick Alston (starters); Andre Smith, Robert McKiver, Cedric Moodie, Cleotis Brown, Maurice Spillers, Jason Osborne, Djibril Kanté, Brice Assie (DNP). Coach: Sergio Hernandez (Peñarol de Mar del Plata)

- Romano replaced Rubén Magnano.

- 23d All-Star Game 2010-11:

DATE: 12–13 March 2011
VENUE: Orfeo Superdomo, Córdoba, att:12.000
SCORE: Nacional All-Stars - Imports All-Stars 51-68

Nacional All-Stars : Bruno Lábaque, Juan Espil, Federico Kammerichs, Leonardo Gutiérrez, Juan Pedro Gutiérrez (starters); Facundo Campazzo, Matías Lescano, Marcos Mata, Gabriel Mikulas, Diego Lo Grippo, Rubén Wolkowyski, Roman Gonzalez, Pepe Sanchez (DNP). Coach: Sergio Hernandez (Peñarol de Mar del Plata)

Imports All-Stars: Andre Laws, David Jackson, Josh Pittman, Gregory Lewis, Robert Battle (starters); Martín Osimani, Gerald Brown, Kyle Lamonte, Ramzee Stanton, Joseph Bunn, Byron Johnson, James Williams. Coach: Julio Lamas (Obras)

- 24th All-Star Game 2011-12:

DATE: 23–24 January 2012
VENUE: Polideportivo Islas Malvinas, Mar del Plata, att:12.000
SCORE: Nacional All-Stars - Imports All-Stars 87-78

Nacional All-Stars : Facundo Campazzo 2, Paolo Quinteros 21, Marcos Mata 7, Leonardo Gutierrez 6, Juan Pedro Gutiérrez 14 (starters); Juan Espil 3, Matias Sandes 5, Diego Lo Grippo 11, Ruben Wolkowyski 10, Martin Leiva 8, Pepe Sanchez 0. Coach: Sergio Hernandez (Peñarol de Mar del Plata)

Imports All-Stars: Martin Osimani 10, Kyle Lamonte 7, Josh Pittman 18, William McFarlan 13, Robert Battle 9 (starters); William Graves 2, Jamaal Levy 2, Larry O'Bannon 9, Jerome Meyinsse 8, Javier Mojica (DNP). Coach: Julio Lamas (Obras)

- 25th All-Star Game 2012-13:

DATE: 21–22 January 2013
VENUE: Polideportivo Islas Malvinas, Mar del Plata, att: 12.500
SCORE: Nacional All-Stars - Imports All-Stars 99-113

Nacional All-Stars : Facundo Campazzo, Paolo Quinteros, Marcos Mata, Leonardo Gutierrez, Juan Pedro Gutiérrez (starters); Nicolás Laprovittola, Pepe Sanchez, Diego García, Federico Van Lacke, Adrián Boccia, Federico Kammerichs, Martín Leiva. Coach: Sergio Hernandez (Peñarol de Mar del Plata)

Imports All-Stars: Martin Osimani, David Jackson, Josh Pittman, John De Groat, Robert Battle (starters); David Teague, Javier Mojica (PUE), Dartona Washam Jr, William Graves, William McFarlan, Daniel Santiago, Darren Phillip. Coach: Nestor Garcia (Boca Juniors)

- 26th All-Star Game 2013-14:

DATE: 12–13 March 2014
VENUE: Estadio Héctor Etchart, att: 3.000
SCORE: Nacional All-Stars - Imports All-Stars 102-126

Nacional All-Stars : Bruno Lábaque, Paolo Quinteros, Walter Herrmann, Leonardo Gutierrez, Martín Leiva (starters); Luis Cequeira, Diego García, Alexis Elsener, Adrián Boccia, Diego Lo Grippo, Diego Romero. Coach: Nicolás Casalánguida (Regatas)

Imports All-Stars: Phillip Hopson, Walter Baxley, Josh Pittman, Ivory Clark, Robert Battle (starters); Lorrenzo Wade, Isaac Sosa, Ricky Sánchez, Gary Flowers, Darren Phillip, Xavier Silas. Coach: Sebastián Ginóbili (Weber Bahía)

- 27th All-Star Game 2014-15:

DATE: 12–13 May 2015
VENUE: Estadio Luna Park, Buenos Aires, att: 6.250
SCORE: Nacional All-Stars - Imports All-Stars 76-90

Nacional All-Stars : Bruno Lábaque 6, Diego García 7, Federico Aguerre 4, Leonardo Gutierrez 15, Marcos Delía 12 (starters); Adrián Boccia 2, Nicolás Aguirre 9, Pablo Espinoza 5, Gabriel Deck 4, Martín Leiva 2, Selem Safar 5, Paolo Quinteros (DNP). Coach: Silvio Santander (Quimsa)

Imports All-Stars: Bruno Fitipaldo 9, Walter Baxley 22, Mauricio Aguiar 11, Ramón Clemente 4, Robert Battle 11 (starters); Martín Osimani 10, Reynaldo García Zamora (CUB) 21, Isaac Sosa 0, Jesse Pellot-Rosa 2, Sam Clancy Jr. 0, Lee Roberts 21, John De Groat (DNP). Coach: Nicolás Casalánguida (Regatas)

- 28th All-Star Game 2015-16:

DATE: 3 May 2016
VENUE: Polideportivo Víctor Nethol, La Plata
SCORE: Nacional All-Stars - Imports All-Stars 107-110

Nacional All-Stars : Diego García 7, Gabriel Deck 2, Walter Herrmann 25, Nicolás de los Santos 2, Marcos Delía 14 (starters); Luca Vildoza 6, Tayavek Gallizi 7, Leonel Schattmann 7, Maximiliano Stanic, Paolo Quinteros 16, Leonardo Gutierrez, Federico Aguerre 21. Coach: Fernando Duró (Club Ciclista Olímpico)

Imports All-Stars: Bruno Fitipaldo 6, Walter Baxley 13, Justin Ray Giddens 14, Dennis Horner 13, Robert Battle 16 (starters); Ramón Clemente, Reynaldo García Zamora (CUB), Marcus Elliot, Mauricio Aguiar 5, David Jackson 13, Darren Phillip 14, Sam Clancy Jr. 0, Lee Roberts, John De Groat (DNP). Coach: Gonzalo García (Club Gimnasia y Esgrima (Comodoro Rivadavia))

- 29th All-Star Game 2016-17:

DATE: 23 July 2017
VENUE: Polideportivo Roberto Pando
SCORE: White Team - Blue Team 92-83

White Team : Franco Balbi 2, Máximo Fjellerup 16, Adrián Boccia 7, Gabriel Deck 4, Ignacio Alessio 10 (starters); José Vildoza 4, Lucas Gargallo 6, Nicolás Romano 8, Patricio Garino 16, Fernando Martina 12, Facundo Campazzo 7, Paolo Quinteros (DNP). Coach: Sergio Hernandez (Argentina national team). Ass: Gabriel Piccato

Blue Team: Luca Vildoza 2, Lucio Redivo 13, Marcos Mata 8, Diego Lo Grippo 10, Roberto Acuña 6 (starters); Juan Pablo Cantero 2, Marcos Delía 10, Selem Safar 6, Nicolás Aguirre 2, Hernán Jasen 0, Eric Flor 12, Nicolás Laprovittola 12. Coach: Gonzalo García (Club Gimnasia y Esgrima (Comodoro Rivadavia)). Ass: Hernán Laginestra

- 30th All-Star Game 2017-18:

DATE: 22 July 2018
VENUE: Polideportivo Roberto Pando
SCORE: White Team - Black Team 110-98

White Team : Walter Herrmann 17, Nicolás de los Santos 7, Ignacio Behr 2, Facundo Campazzo 26, Juan Pablo Cantero 7, Pablo Espinoza 7, Martín Leiva 11, Paolo Quinteros 2, Leo Schattmann 13, Bruno Barovero 8, Ignacio Alessio 8, Adrián Boccia 2. Coach: Gonzalo García (Club Gimnasia y Esgrima (Comodoro Rivadavia)).

Black Team: Nicolás Romano 13, Máximo Fjellerup 16, Luca Vildoza 11, José Vildoza 6, Nicolás Laprovittola 11, Héctor Martirena 10, Maximiliano Stanic 3, Lucio Redivo 0, Javier Saiz 10, Franco Giorgetti 4, Eric Flor 6, Roberto Acuña, 8, Mateo Soñora 0. Coach: Guillermo Narvarte

- 31st All-Star Game 2018-19:

DATE: 14 July 2019
VENUE: Microestadio Antonio Rotili, Lanus
SCORE: White Team - Blue Team 60-58

White Team : Facundo Campazzo 3, Mauro Cosolito 4, Andrés Nocioni 14, Lucio Redivo 3, Damián Tintorelli 6, Eric Flor 4, Máximo Fjellerup 10, Kevin Hernández 14, Nicolás Aguirre. Coach: Silvio Santander

Blue Team: Mariano Fierro 16, Roberto Acuña 4, Nicolás Brussino 8, Héctor Campana 3, Nicolás Laprovittola 8, José Vildoza 10, Paolo Quinteros 5, Ignacio Alessio 4, Luciano González 2. Coach: Julio Lamas.

- 32nd All-Star Game 2020-21:

DATE: 14 July 2021
VENUE: Polideportivo Roberto Pando, San Lorenzo
SCORE: White Team - Black Team 84-66

White Team : Manuel Buendía, Franco Baralle, Florencia Chagas (female), Mauro Cosolito, Carlos Valdovinos, Martin Cuello, Sebastián Vega, Mariana Redi (female), Nicolás Romano, Ivan Basualdo, Juan Pedro Gutiérrez, Kevin Hernández. Coach: Sebastián González

Black Team: Fernando Zurbriggen, Jonatan Alberto Treise, Melisa Gretter (female), Sebastian Festa (DNP), Paolo Quinteros, Federico Marin, Adrián Bocchia, Lucas Gargallo, Evangelina Paiva (female), Mariano Fierro, Juan Aude, Agostina Burani (female), Roberto Acuña. Coach: Gonzalo García

- 33d All-Star Game 2021-22:

DATE: 19 July 2022
VENUE: Estadio La Pedrera
SCORE: White Team - Black Team 70-60

White Team : Sofía Cabrera (female), Franco Barrale, Paolo Quinteros, Lucio Reinaudi, Mauro Cosolito, Hector Campana, Martín Cuello, Carolina Sanchez (female), Agustín Barreiro, Mariano Fierro, Ignacio Alessio. Coach: Sergio Hernandez.

Black Team: Agustina Marin (female), Luvas Faggiano, Leo Schattmann, Mateo Chiarini, Matías Solanas, Sebastián Vega, Esteban Perez, Agustina Jourdheuil (female), Leo Lema, Gustavo Acosta, Tayavek Gallizzi. Coach: Gustavo Fernández

- 34th All-Star Game 2022-23:

DATE: 20 July 2023
VENUE: Estadio Héctor Etchart
SCORE: White Team - Red Team 53-64

White Team : Franco Balbi, Camila Suárez (female), Paolo Quinteros, Mauro Cosolito, Martín Cuello, Candela Gentinetta (female), Fabián Ramírez Barrios, Walter Herrmann, Mariano Fierro, Ignacio Alessio, Sebastián Chaine. Coach: Leandro Ramella

Red Team: Pedro Barral, Sebastián Festa, Nicolás Gianella, Micaela Gonzalez (female), Selem Safar, Federico Marín, Agustina García (female), Nicolás Romano, Matías Nuñez, Lautaro Berra, Kevin Hernández. Coach: Julio Lamas

- 35th All-Star Game 2023-24:

DATE: 25 July 2024
VENUE: Espacio DAM
SCORE: White Team - Blue Team 58-57

White Team : Fernando Zurbriggen, Florencia Chagas (female), Mauro Cosolito, Andrés Nocioni, Roberto Acuña (starters); Sebastián Orresta, Ignacio Laterza, Paolo Quinteros, Agustín Brocal, Agustina Marin, Lucas Arn. Coach: Sebastian Gonzalez

Blue Team: Pedro Barral, Hector Campana, Leo Lema, Carla Miculka (female), Kevin Hernández (starters); Lucas Andújar, Joaquin Valinotti, Galo Terrera, Micaela Gonzalez (female), Eric Flor, Leonardo Lema, Juan Pedro Gutiérrez. Coach: Ruben Magnano

- 36th All-Star Game 2024-25:

DATE: 22 July 2025
VENUE: Estadio Antonio Rotili, Lanús
SCORE: White Team - Black Team 42-54

White Team : Alejandro Montecchia 0, Emiliano Lezcano 8, Julia Fernandez (female) 4, Mauro Cosolito 2, Gabriel Fernandez 5 (starters); Diego Figueredo 10, Victor Fernandez 3, Dalma Piri (female) 3, Leo Lema 12, Selem Safar 0, Ivan Basualdo 0. Coach: Sergio Hernandez.

Blue Team: Franco Balbi 2, Agustina Garcia (female) 4, Agustin Barreiro 5, Walter Herrmann 13, Paolo Quinteros 3 (starters); Agustin Brocal 2, Florencia Martinez (female) 0, Felipe Pais 0, Martin Cuello 3, Lucas Andújar 0, Sebastian Chaine 2. Coach: Julio Lamas

== Slam-dunk winners ==
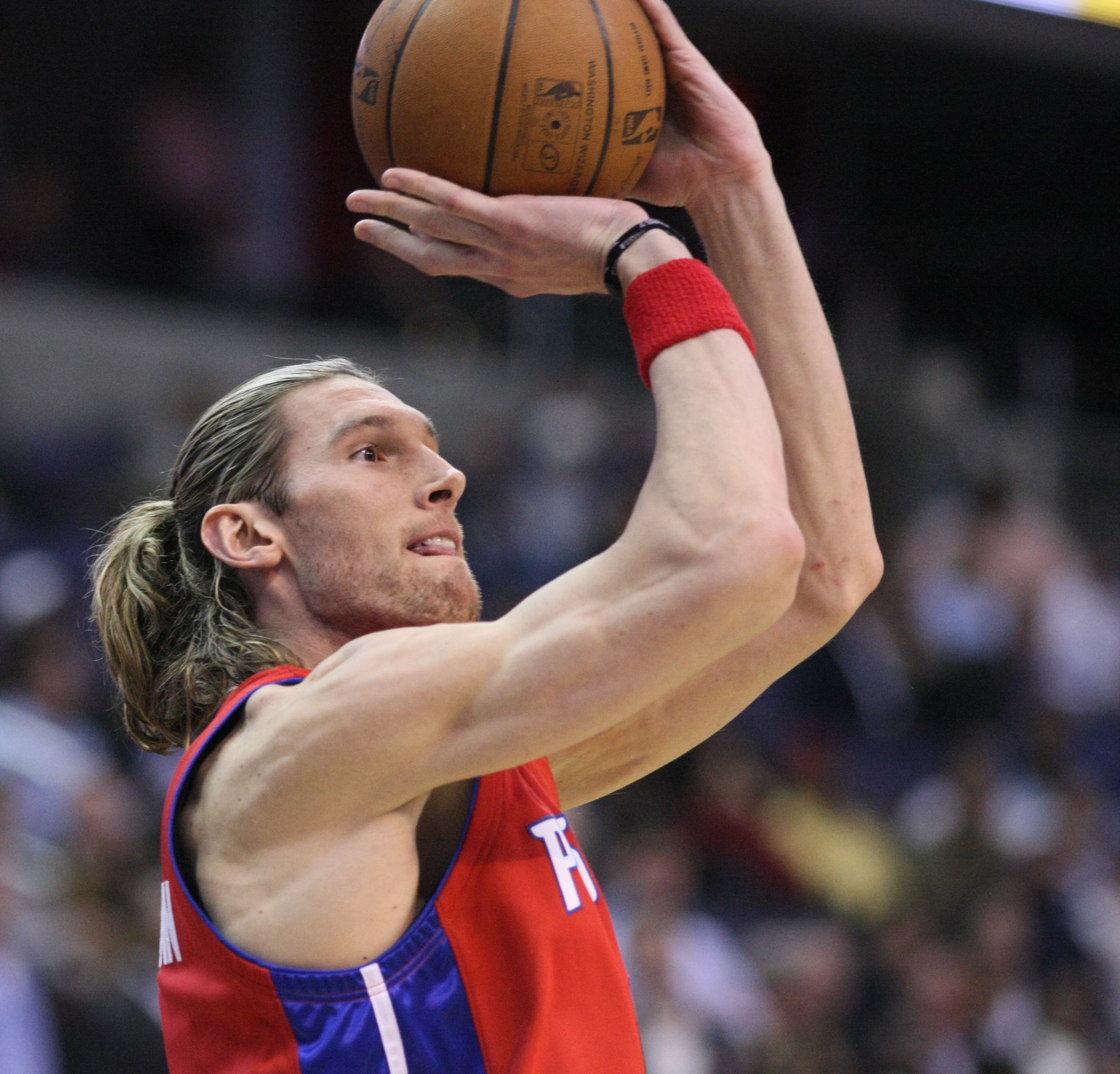
Walter Herrmann won the Slam-dunk contest twice.

Player (#)	Number of how many times the player won the contest
Team (#)	Number of how many times a club won the contest

Edition	Player	Club
1988	(Argentina) Raúl Merlo	River Plate (1)
1989	(Argentina) Luis Villar	River Plate (2)
1990	(Argentina) Héctor Campana	River Plate (3)
1991	(Argentina) Hernán Montenegro	Estudiantes de Bahía Blanca
1992	(Argentina) Jorge Racca	Pico Football Club
1993	(Argentina) Oscar Chiaramello	Gimnasia y Esgrima (Comodoro Rivadavia)
1994	—	—
1995	(Argentina) Fabricio Oberto	Atenas de Córdoba (1)
1996	(Argentina) Leandro Palladino	Atenas de Córdoba (2)
1997	(Argentina) Marcelo Mangiacavalli	Obras Sanitarias (1)
1998	(Argentina) Leonardo Gutiérrez	Olimpia de Venado Tuerto (1)
1999	(Argentina) Walter Herrmann (1)	Olimpia de Venado Tuerto (2)
2000	(Argentina) Walter Herrmann (2)	Olimpia de Venado Tuerto (3)
2001	(Argentina) Diego Ciorciari	Ferro Carril Oeste
2002	(Argentina) Federico Van Lacke	Atlético Echagüe Club (1)
2003	(Argentina) Fernando Funes	Atenas de Córdoba (3)
2004	(United States) Jamaal Thomas	Atlético Echagüe Club (2)
2005	(Argentina) Mariano Fierro	Estudiantes de Olavarría (1)
2006	(Argentina) Pablo Espinoza	Argentino de Junín (1)
2007	(United States) Byron Johnson	Independiente de Neuquén
2008	(United States) Chris Jefferies	Obras Sanitarias (2)
2009	(Argentina) Dragan Capitanich	Quilmes de Mar del Plata (1)
2010	(Argentina) Alan Omar	Obras Sanitarias (3)
2011	(United States) Decorey Young	Instituto de Córdoba
2012	(United States) William Graves	Boca Juniors
2013	(Argentina) Tayavek Gallizi (1)	Quilmes de Mar del Plata (2)
2014	(Argentina) Tayavek Gallizi (2) (United States) Rasheem Barret	Quilmes de Mar del Plata (3); San Lorenzo (Chivilcoy)
2015	(Argentina) Tayavek Gallizi (3)	Quilmes de Mar del Plata (4)
2016	(United States) Anthony Johnson	Weber Bahía
2017	(Argentina) Carlos Buemo	Echagüe
2018	(Argentina) Leandro Cerminato	Estudiantes de Olavarría (2)
2019	(Argentina) Ramiro Trebucq	Argentino de Junín (2)

=== Players with most wins ===
Player	Wins	Editions
(Argentina) Tayavek Gallizi	3	2013, 2014, 2015.
(Argentina) Walter Herrmann	2	1999, 2000.

== Three-point shootout contest ==
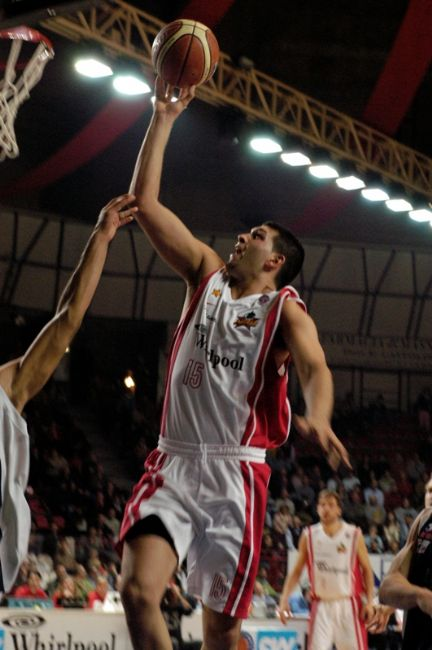
Gabriel Fernández won the contest 3 times.

Player (#)	Number of how many times the player won the contest
Team (#)	Number of how many times a club won the contest

Edition	Player	Club
1988	(Argentina) Carlos Raffaelli	Deportivo San Andrés
1989	(Argentina) Nelio Badaloni (1)	Sport Club Cañadense
1990	(Argentina) Marcelo Milanesio (1)	Atenas (1)
1991	(Argentina) Miguel Cortijo	Peñarol (1)
1992	(Argentina) Nelio Badaloni (2)	Invited
1993	(Argentina) Marcelo Milanesio (2)	Atenas (2)
1994	—	—
1995	(Argentina) Héctor Campana	Peñarol (2)
1996	(Argentina) Mario Milanesio	Luz y Fuerza de Posadas
1997	(Argentina) Jorge Racca	Olimpia (VT)
1998	(Argentina) Leonardo Zanassi	Peñarol (3)
1999	(Argentina) Alejandro Montecchia	Boca Juniors (1)
2000	(Argentina) Gabriel Fernández (1)	Boca Juniors (2)
2001	(Argentina) Gabriel Fernández (2)	Estudiantes (O) (1)
2002	(Argentina) Paolo Quinteros (1)	Estudiantes (O) (2)
2003	(Argentina) Eduardo Dominé (1)	Obras Sanitarias (1)
2004	(Argentina) Eduardo Dominé (2)	Obras Sanitarias (2)
2005	(United States) Williard Ford	Peñarol (4)
2006	(Argentina) Paolo Quinteros (2)	Boca Juniors (3)
2007	(Argentina) Leandro Masieri (1)	Gimnasia (CR) (1)
2008	(Argentina) Leandro Masieri (2)	Club Belgrano
2009	(Argentina) Leandro Masieri (3)	Boca Juniors (4)
2010	(Argentina) Juan Espil (1)	Obras Sanitarias (3)
2011	(Argentina) Juan Espil (2)	Weber Bahía Estudiantes
2012	(Argentina) Leonardo Gutiérrez	Peñarol (5)
2013	(Argentina) Bruno Lábaque (1)	Atenas (3)
2014	(Argentina) Bruno Lábaque (2) (Argentina) Juan Espil (3)	Atenas (4); Estrella
2015	(Puerto Rico) Isaac Sosa	Boca Juniors (5)
2016	(Argentina) Federico Aguerre	Gimnasia Indalo (2)
2017	(Argentina) Eduardo Dominé (3) (Argentina) Lucio Redivo	Estrella; Bahía Basket
2018	(Argentina) Manuel Buendía (1)	Gimnasia (CR) (3)
2019	(Argentina) Manuel Buendía (2)	Gimnasia (CR) (4)
2020	—	—
2021	(Argentina) Paolo Quinteros (3)	Regatas Corrientes
2022	(Argentina) Martín Cuello	Instituto
2023	(Argentina) Selem Safar	Centauros de Portuguesa
2024	(Argentina) Joaquín Valinotti	Peñarol (6)
2025	(Argentina) Martín Cuello	Boca Juniors (6)

=== Players with most wins ===
Player	Wins	Editions
(Argentina) Paolo Quinteros	3	2002, 2006, 2021.
(Argentina) Leandro Masieri	3	2007, 2008, 2009.
(Argentina) Juan Espil	3	2010, 2011, 2013.
(Argentina) Eduardo Dominé	2	2003, 2004, 2017.
(Argentina) Nelio Baladoni	2	1989, 1992.
(Argentina) Marcelo Milanesio	2	1990, 1993.
(Argentina) Gabriel Fernández	2	2000, 2001.
(Argentina) Bruno Lábaque	2	2013, 2014.
(Argentina) Manuel Buendía	2	2018, 2019.

== Long-range shootout contest ==
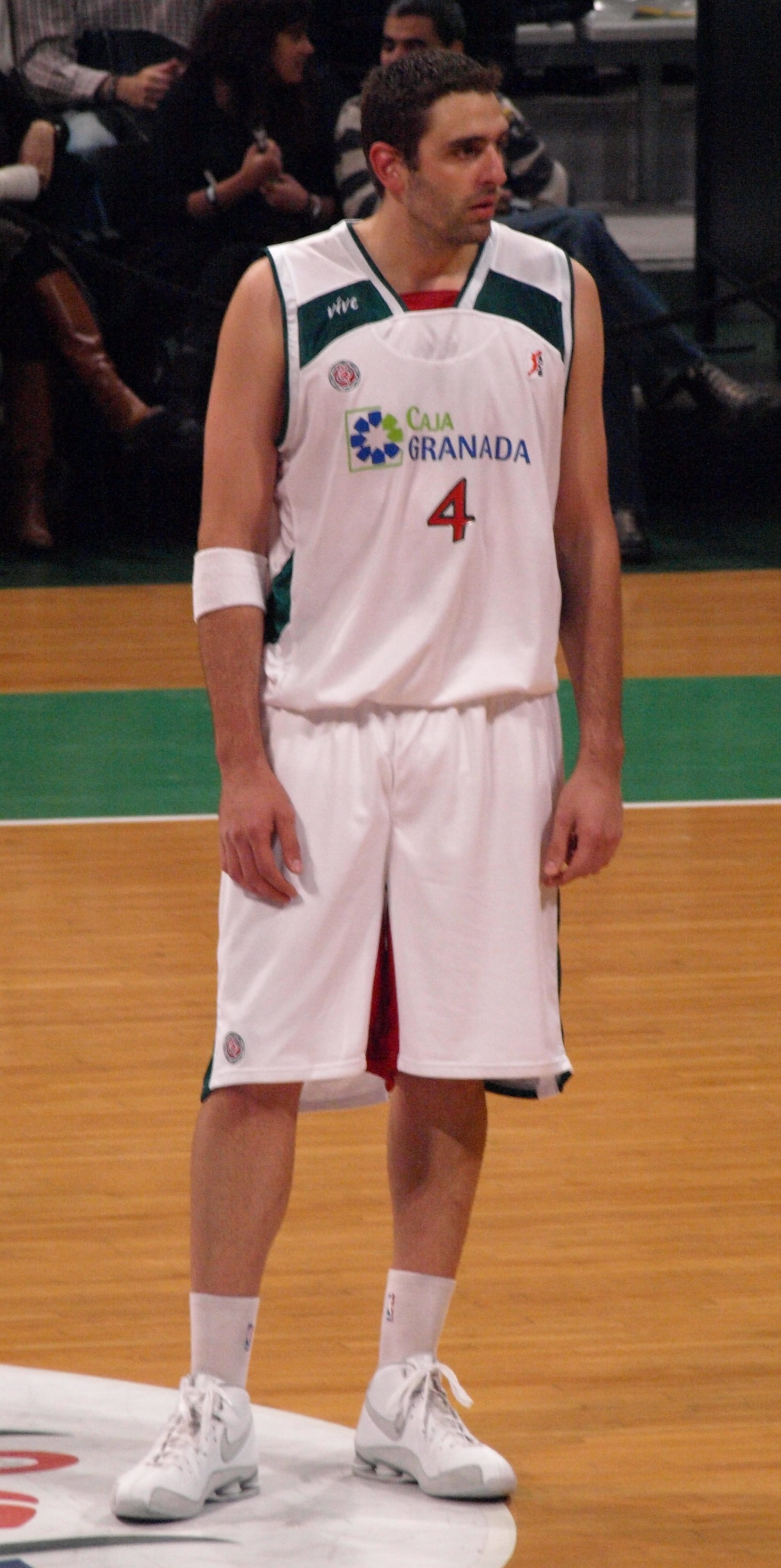
Juan Pedro Gutiérrez won the fourth edition.

Player (#)	Number of how many times the player won the contest
Team (#)	Number of how many times a club won the contest

Edition	Player	Club
2010	(Argentina) Julio Mázzaro (Obras) (Argentina) Héctor Campana (Legend - retired) (Argentina) Verónica Soberón (Women's selection)	14s
2011	(Argentina) Federico Kammerichs (Regatas (C)) (Argentina) Mario Milanesio (Legend - retired) (Argentina) Rocío Rojas (Women's selection)	27s 6
2012	(Argentina) Juan Pablo Cantero (Lanús) (Argentina) Esteban De la Fuente (Legend - retired) (Argentina) Macarena Durso (Women's selection)	18s 2
2013	(Argentina) Juan Pedro Gutiérrez (Obras) (Argentina) Mariano Aguilar (Legend - retired) (Argentina) Macarena Durso (Women's selection)	25s 5
2014	(Argentina) Adrián Boccia (Peñarol) (Argentina) Héctor Campana (Legend - retired) (Argentina) Macarena Durso (Women's selection)	30s 6
2019	(Argentina) Mauro Cosolito (Ferro) (Argentina) Juan Pedro Gutiérrez (Legend - retired) (Argentina) Débora González (Women's selection)	
2021	(Argentina) Paolo Quinteros (Regatas (C)) (Argentina) Esteban Pérez (Legend - retired) (Argentina) Agustina Jourdheuil (Women's selection)	18s 1
2022	Sebastián Vega (Gimnasia (CR)); Agostina Burani (Women's selection); Juan Aude (Paralympian Argentina national team )	42s 5
2023	(Argentina) Ignacio Alessio (Unión (SF)) (Argentina) Walter Herrmann (Legend - retired) (Argentina) Candela Gentinetta (Women's selection)	28s 8
2024	(Argentina) Héctor Campana (Legend - retired) (Argentina) Juan Pedro Gutiérrez (Legend - retired) (Argentina) Carla Miculka (Women's selection)	38s 3
2025	(Argentina) Walter Herrmann (Legend - retired) (Argentina) Paolo Quinteros (Legend - retired) (Argentina) Agustina García (Women's selection)	56.5 and 1.16.4

== Topscorers ==
Year	Player	Team
2004	(Argentina) Paolo Quinteros (United States) Josh Pittman (22 pts)	Boca Juniors; Atenas
2006	(Argentina) Leonardo Gutierrez (24 pts)	Ben Hur
2007	(Argentina) Leonardo Gutierrez (20 pts)	Boca Juniors
2008	(United States) Antwon Hall (22 pts)	Quilmes de Mar del Plata
2010	(Argentina) Juan Manuel Locatelli (25 pts)	Atenas
2011	(United States) Kyle Lamonte (14 pts)	Club Atlético Peñarol (Mar del Plata)
2012	(Argentina) Paolo Quinteros (21 pts)	Regatas Corrientes
2013	(United States) David Jackson (30 pts)	Gimnasia Indalo
2014	(Argentina) Walter Herrmann (24 pts)	Atenas
2015	(United States) Walter Baxley (22 pts)	Quilmes de Mar del Plata
2016	(Argentina) Walter Herrmann (25 pts)	Atenas
2017	(Argentina) Máximo Fjellerup (Argentina) Patricio Garino (16 pts)	Weber Bahia (United States) Orlando Magic
2018	(Argentina) Facundo Campazzo (26 pts)	(Spain) Real Madrid
2022	(Argentina) Hector Campana (13 pts)	(Retired)
2025	(Argentina) Walter Herrmann (13 pts)	(Retired)

== Players with most selections ==
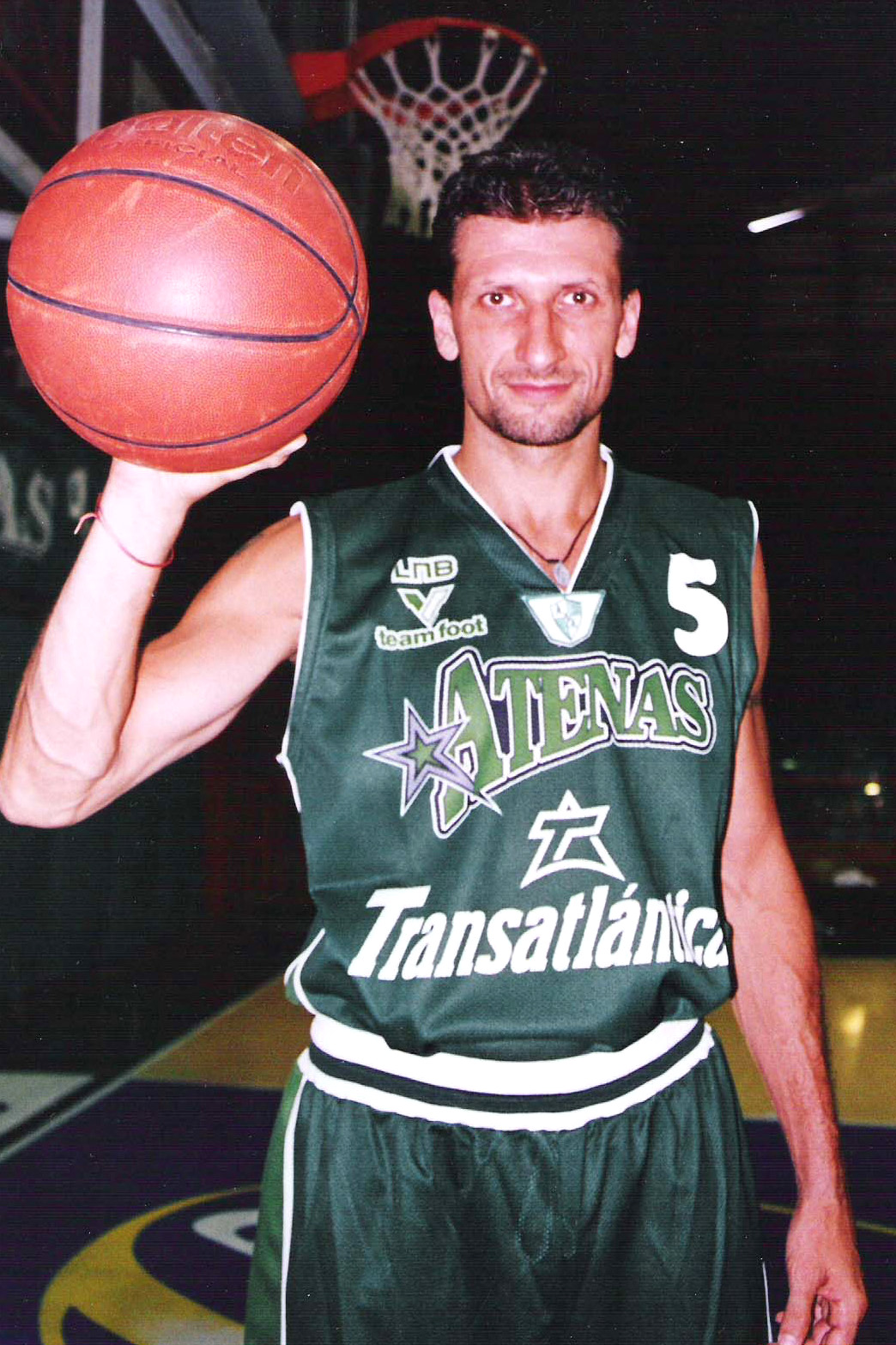
Héctor Campana is the player with most MVP awards (8) in the history of the LNB All-Star Game

Player	Selections	Editions	Notes
(Argentina) (Italy) Paolo Quinteros	18	2002, 2003, 2004, 2005, 2012, 2013, 2014, 2015 (DNP), 2016, 2017 (DNP), 2018, 2019, 2021, 2022, 2023, 2024, 2025 (retired)	3x MVP (2005, 2012, 2024)
(Argentina) Héctor Campana	17	1988, 1989, 1990, 1992, 1993, 1995, 1996, 1997, 1998, 1999, 2000, 2001, 2003, 2004, 2019, 2022, 2024 (retired)	8x MVP (1992, 1993, 1997, 1998, 2000, 2001, 2003, 2022
(Argentina) Leonardo Gutiérrez	16	2000, 2001, 2004, 2005, 2006, 2007, 2008, 2009, 2010, 2011, 2012, 2013, 2014, 2015, 2016	1x MVP (2006)
(Argentina) Diego Osella	15	1989, 1990, 1992, 1993, 1995, 1996, 1997, 1998, 1999, 2010	
(Argentina) Marcelo Milanesio	11	1988, 1989, 1990, 1992, 1993, 1996, 1997, 1998, 1999, 2000, 2001	2x Three-point winner (1990, 1993)
(Argentina) Martín Leiva	10	2012, 2013, 2014, 2015	
(Argentina) Rubén Wolkowyski	10	1993, 1995, 1996, 1997, 1998, 1999, 2000, 2010, 2011, 2012	1x MVP (1996)
(Argentina) Esteban Pérez	9	1988, 1991, 1993, 1995, 1996, 1997, 1998, 1999, 2022 (retired)	
(Argentina) Julio Mázzaro	8	2003, 2005, 2006, 2007, 2008, 2009, 2010, 2011	
(Argentina) Walter Herrmann	8	1999, 2000, 2001, 2002, 2014, 2016, 2023, 2025 (retired)	2x Slam-dunk winner
(Argentina) Juan Espil	8	1991, 1993, 1995, 2010, 2011, 2012	3x Thee-point winner
(Argentina) Juan Manuel Locatelli	7	2010, 2011, 2012	
(United States) Josh Pittman	7	2004, 2005, 2007, 2011, 2012, 2013, 2014	1x MVP (2004)
(United States) Robert Battle	7	2008, 2011-2016	1x MVP (2016)
(Argentina) Jorge Racca	7	1991, 1992, 1993, 1996, 1997, 1998, 1999	1x Slam-dunk winner and 1x Thee-point winner
(Argentina) Bruno Lábaque	7	2002, 2003, 2007, 2009, 2010, 2011, 2014, 2015	
(Argentina) Diego García	7	2007-2010, 2013, 2014, 2015, 2016	
(Argentina) Alejandro Montecchia	6	1993, 1996, 1997, 1998, 1999, 2025 (retired)	1x Thee-point winner (1999)
(Argentina) Daniel Farabello	6	1997, 1998, 1999, 2000, 2001, 2002	
(Argentina) Diego Lo Grippo	6	2010, 2012, 2014, 2017	
(Argentina) Adrián Boccia	5	2013, 2014, 2015, 2017, 2021	
(Argentina) Pablo Sebastián Rodríguez	5	2010	
(Argentina) Marcos Mata	5	2010, 2011, 2012, 2013, 2017	
(Argentina) Facundo Campazzo	5	2011, 2012, 2013 and 2017, 2018 (guest)	2x MVP (2017, 2018)
(Argentina) Fabricio Oberto	4	1995, 1996, 1997, 1998	1x MVP (1998), 1x Slam-dunk winner (1998)
(Argentina) Hernán Montenegro	4	1991, 1995, 1998, 1999	1x MVP (1995) and 1x Slam-dunk winner (1991)
(United States) David Jackson	4	2009–2011, 2013	1x MVP
(Argentina) Luis Villar			2x MVP (1988, 1989)
(Argentina) Matías Sandes	4	2005, 2006, 2012	
(Argentina) Nicolás Laprovittola	4	2013, 2017-2019	
(Argentina) Román González	4	2008, 2009, 2010, 2011	
(Argentina) Federico Kammerichs	4	2011, 2013	
(Argentina) (Spain) Juan Pedro Gutiérrez	4	2011, 2012, 2013, 2025	
(Argentina) Gabriel Mikulas	3	2007, 2009, 2011	
(United States) (England) Darren Phillip	3	2013, 2014, 2016	
(Argentina) Lucas Victoriano	2	2010	
(Argentina) Pepe Sanchez	2	2013	
(Uruguay) Martín Osimani	4	2013, 2015	
(Argentina) Marcelo Richotti	4	1997-2000	
(United States) Stanley Easterling	3	2000, 2003, 2004	
(Argentina) Andres Nocioni	3	1999, 2019, 2024	
(United States) William Graves	2	2013	
(United States) Kyle Lamonte	2	2012	
(Argentina) Sebastián Uranga	2	1991, 1992	
(Argentina) Gabriel Cocha	2	1996, 1997	
(Argentina) Raúl Merlo	2	1999, 2000	
(Argentina) Hernan Jansen	2	1999, 2017	

== Distinctions ==
=== FIBA Hall of Fame ===
- (Argentina) Fabricio Oberto

== See also ==
- Liga Nacional de Básquetbol

== Sources ==
- All finals 1988-2024
- Se desarrolló el Juego de las Estrellas
