= 2013–14 Liga Nacional de Básquet season =

- League: Liga Nacional de Básquet
- Sport: Basketball
- Duration: 9 October 2013 – 5 April 2014 (regular season); 9 April – 5 June 2014 (playoffs)
- Number of teams: 16
- TV partner(s): TyC Sports
- Season MVP: (Argentina) Walter Herrmann
- Top scorer: (United States) Walter Baxley

2014 Liga Nacional de Básquet Playoffs
- Finals champions: Peñarol
- Runners-up: Regatas Corrientes
- Finals MVP: (Argentina) Facundo Campazzo (Peñarol)

Liga Nacional de Básquet seasons
- ← 2012–13 2014–15 →

The 2013–14 Liga Nacional de Básquet season was the 30th season of the top professional basketball league in Argentina. The regular season started on 9 October 2013. Peñarol won their fifth title, defeating defending champions Regatas Corrientes in the finals. This was the first season without relegations to the Torneo Nacional de Ascenso.

== Promotions and relegations ==
Torneo Nacional de Ascenso Champions from the previous season Estudiantes Concordia and runners-up Quilmes were promoted.

== Clubs ==
Team	City	Arena	Capacity
Argentino de Junín	Junín	El Fortín de las Morochas	1,465
Atenas	Córdoba	Carlos Cerutti	3,730
Bahía Basket	Bahía Blanca	Osvaldo Casanova	3,950
Boca Juniors	Buenos Aires	Luis Conde	2,000
Ciclista Olímpico	La Banda	Luis Conde	2,000
Estudiantes Concordia	Concordia	Gigante Verde	1,610
Gimnasia y Esgrima (Comodoro Rivadavia)	Comodoro Rivadavia	Socios Fundadores	2,276
Juventud Sionista	Paraná	Estadio Moisés Flesler	2,100
Lanús	Lanús	Antonio Rotili	4,000
Libertad	Sunchales	El Hogar de los Tigres	4,000
Obras Sanitarias	Buenos Aires	Estadio Obras	3,100
Peñarol	Mar del Plata	Islas Malvinas	8,000
Quilmes	Mar del Plata	Once Unidos	3,000
Quimsa	Santiago del Estero	Estadio Ciudad	5,200
Regatas Corrientes	Corrientes	José Jorge Contte	4,000
La Unión	Formosa	Cincuentenario	4,500

== Regular season ==
=== First stage ===
The first stage took place between 10 October and 24 November 2013. Teams were divided into two zones. The top four teams from each zone competed in the Torneo Súper 8 that took place in December.

==== North Zone ====
Pos	Team	Pld	W	L	Pts	Qualification
1	Regatas Corrientes	14	12	2	26	Qualified to Torneo Súper 8
2	Atenas	14	9	5	23	Qualified to Torneo Súper 8
3	Libertad	14	8	6	22	Qualified to Torneo Súper 8
4	Quimsa	14	7	7	21	Qualified to Torneo Súper 8
5	Estudiantes Concordia	14	6	8	20	
6	Juventud Sionista	14	6	8	20	
7	La Unión	14	5	9	19	
8	Ciclista Olímpico	14	3	11	17	

==== South Zone ====
Pos	Team	Pld	W	L	Pts	Qualification
1	Gimnasia Indalo	14	11	3	25	Qualified to Torneo Súper 8
2	Peñarol	14	9	5	23	Qualified to Torneo Súper 8
3	Quilmes	14	8	6	22	Qualified to Torneo Súper 8
4	Obras Sanitarias	14	8	6	22	Qualified to Torneo Súper 8
5	Boca Juniors	14	7	7	21	
6	Argentino de Junín	14	6	8	20	
7	Bahía Basket	14	4	10	18	
8	Lanús	6	3	3	9	

=== Torneo Súper 8 ===
The ninth edition of Torneo Súper 8 took place on 18–21 December 2013 in the city of San Martín, Mendoza. Peñarol won their fourth title, defeating Quimsa in the Final, and were granted a berth in the 2014 Liga Sudamericana de Básquetbol.

Quarterfinals
Gimnasia Indalo	61
Quimsa	76
Atenas	91
Quilmes	74
Regatas Corrientes	82
Obras Sanitarias	57
Peñarol	82
Libertad	77

Semifinals
Quimsa	92
Atenas	84
Regatas Corrientes	89
Peñarol	96

Final
Quimsa	76
Peñarol	82

=== Second stage ===
The second stage started on 28 November 2013. All 16 teams were ranked together. Each team carried over half of the points obtained in the first stage.

Pos	Team	Pld	W	L	Pts	Qualification
1	Regatas Corrientes	30	25	5	68	Conference quarterfinals
2	Peñarol	30	24	6	65.5	Conference quarterfinals
3	Boca Juniors	30	22	8	62.5	Conference quarterfinals
4	Libertad	30	16	14	57	Conference quarterfinals
5	Atenas	30	15	15	56.5	Reclassification playoffs
6	Argentino de Junín	30	16	14	56	Reclassification playoffs
7	Gimnasia Indalo	30	13	17	55.5	Reclassification playoffs
8	Juventud Sionista	30	15	15	55	Reclassification playoffs
9	Quilmes	30	14	16	55	Reclassification playoffs
10	Obras Sanitarias	30	14	16	55	Reclassification playoffs
11	Ciclista Olímpico	30	16	14	54.5	Reclassification playoffs
12	Quimsa	30	14	16	54.5	Reclassification playoffs
13	Estudiantes Concordia	30	14	16	54	
14	Bahía Basket	30	12	18	51	
15	Lanús	30	6	24	44.5	
16	La Unión	30	4	26	43.5	

== Playoffs ==
The Playoffs started on 9 April 2014 and ended on 5 June 2014. Peñarol defeated Regatas Corrientes in the Finals and won their fifth title. Both teams were qualified for the 2015 FIBA Americas League. Since Peñarol had also qualified to the 2014 Liga Sudamericana de Básquetbol after winning the Torneo Súper 8, their berth was given to the next best team that was not qualified yet, in this case Libertad.

Reclassification
5	Atenas	1
12	Quimsa	3
4	Argentino de Junín	3
11	Ciclista Olímpico	0
8	Juventud Sionista	0
9	Quilmes	3
7	Gimnasia Indalo	3
10	Obras Sanitarias	1

Quarterfinals
1	Regatas Corrientes	3
12	Quimsa	1
4	Libertad	1
6	Argentino de Junín	3
2	Peñarol	3
9	Quilmes	1
3	Boca Juniors	3
7	Gimnasia Indalo	1

Semifinals
1	Regatas Corrientes	3
6	Argentino de Junín	0
2	Peñarol	3
3	Boca Juniors	0

Final
1	Regatas Corrientes	2
2	Peñarol	4

== Clubs in international competitions ==
Team	Competition	Progress
Lanús	FIBA Americas League	Group stage
Regatas Corrientes	FIBA Americas League	Semifinals
Argentino de Junín	Liga Sudamericana de Básquetbol	Semifinals
Boca Juniors	Liga Sudamericana de Básquetbol	Fourth place
Peñarol	Liga Sudamericana de Básquetbol	Semifinals

== Awards ==
=== Yearly Awards ===
- Most Valuable Player: Walter Herrmann, Atenas
- Best Foreign Player: Walter Baxley, Quilmes
- Sixth Man of the Year: Marcos Delía, Boca Juniors
- Rookie of the Year: Matías Bortolín, Regatas Corrientes
- Coach of the Year: Nicolás Casalánguida, Regatas Corrientes
- Most Improved Player: Fernando Martina, Regatas Corrientes
- All-Tournament Team:
  - F Walter Herrmann, Atenas
  - F Leonardo Gutiérrez, Peñarol
  - C Sam Clancy Jr., Gimnasia Indalo
  - G Facundo Campazzo, Peñarol
  - G Paolo Quinteros, Regatas Corrientes
