= Selem Safar =

Argentine basketball player

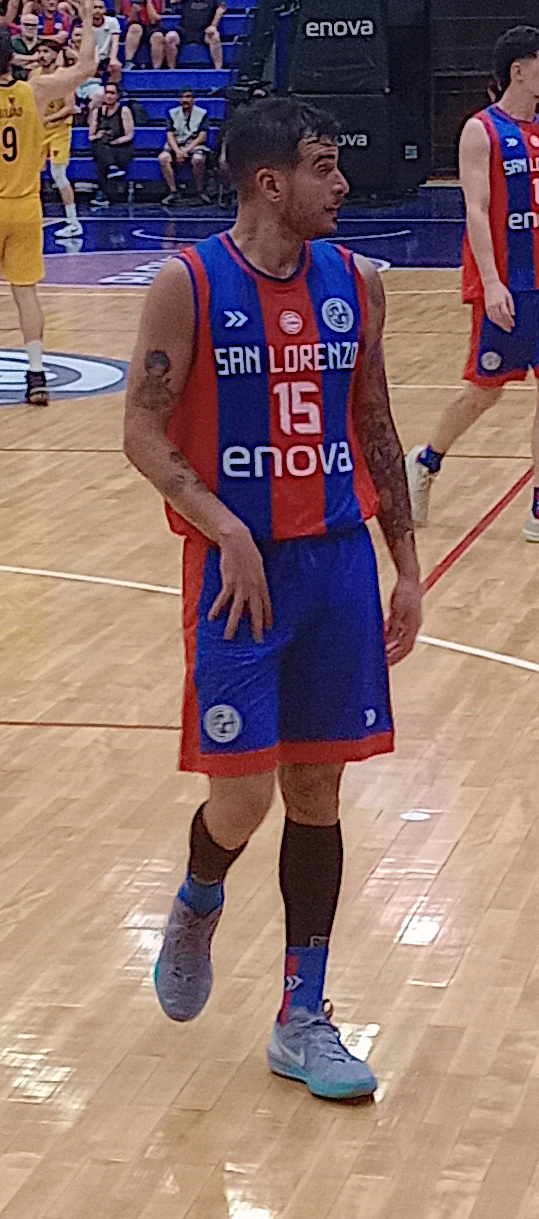
- Safar in 2025 playing for San Lorenzo

San Lorenzo
- Position: Shooting guard
- League: Liga Nacional de Básquet

Personal information
- Born: 6 May 1987 (age 39) Mar del Plata, Argentina
- Listed height: 6 ft 3.75 in (1.92 m)
- Listed weight: 208 lb (94 kg)

Career information
- Playing career: 2003–present

Career history
- 2003–2005: Quilmes de Mar del Plata
- 2005–2006: Olimpia
- 2006–2007: Ciclista Juninense
- 2007–2008: Quilmes de Mar del Plata
- 2008–2010: Club Atlético Argentino de Junín
- 2010–2013: Peñarol de Mar del Plata
- 2013–2014: Boca Juniors
- 2014–2016: Obras Sanitarias
- 2016–2018: San Lorenzo
- 2018–2020: Club Comunicaciones
- 2020–2021: Titanes de Barranquilla
- 2022–present: Club Atlético Riachuelo
Medals
Men's Basketball
Representing Argentina
FIBA AmeriCup
Silver medal – second place	2015 Mexico City
Bronze medal – third place	2013 Caracas
FIBA South American Championship
Gold medal – first place	2012 Argentina
Silver medal – second place	2014 Venezuela

Selem Safar (born 6 May 1987) is an Argentine professional basketball player of Syrian origin. He has also been a member the senior Argentine national basketball team, and their junior teams in the past.

== Professional career ==
Safar has played in the top-tier level Argentine League.

== National team career ==
As a member of the senior Argentine national basketball team, Safar played at the 2013 FIBA Americas Championship, the 2014 FIBA World Cup, and the 2015 FIBA Americas Championship.

== Awards and accomplishments ==
=== Club career ===
Peñarol de Mar del Plata

- 2× Liga Nacional de Básquet: (2011, 2012)
- Torneo Súper 8: (2011)
- Argentine Cup: (2010)

San Lorenzo

- FIBA Americas League: (2018)
- 3× Liga Nacional de Básquet: (2012, 2017, 2018)
- Torneo Súper 4: (2017)

Titanes de Barranquilla

- 3× Baloncesto Profesional Colombiano: (2020, 2021-I, 2021-II)

=== National team ===
Argentina

- FIBA Americas Championship (bronze) bronze medal: (2013)

=== Individual ===
- Baloncesto Profesional Colombiano Finals MVP: (2020)
