= Ginóbili =

Ginóbili is a surname. Notable people with this surname include:

- Manu Ginóbili (born 1977), Argentinian basketball player
- Sebastián Ginóbili (born 1972), Argentinian basketball player
