= Bruno Lábaque =

Argentine basketball player

Personal information
- Born: November 11, 1977 (age 49) Córdoba

Career information
- Playing career: 1994–2017
- Position: Point guard

Career history
- 1994–2003: Atenas
- 2003–04: Rimini Crabs
- 2004–05: Tenerife
- 2005–06: River Plate
- 2006: Sebastiani Rieti
- 2006–09: Atenas
- 2009–10: Obras Sanitarias
- 2010–17: Atenas

Bruno Lábaque (born November 11, 1977, in Córdoba) is an Argentine former professional basketball player. His position on the field was point guard. Lábaque spent most of his career at Atenas, where he won 12 titles with the team. Lábaque played more the 900 games for Atenas, with near 9,000 points scored.

== Career ==
=== Club ===
Lábaque started his career in Atenas, debuting in the Liga Nacional de Básquet on November 13, 1994, vs. Quilmes (MDP).

On March 8, 2017, Lábaque played his 900th game in the Liga Nacional de Básquet, when Atenas played Estudiantes (Concordia). Lábaque became the 6th player to attend more than 900 games. His best performance was in May 2017 when he scored 41 points in a game.

In May 2017 Lábaque played his last game, when his team, Atenas, lost to Instituto de Córdoba. That night Atenas announced that number "7" would be retired in his honour.

=== National team ===
Lábaque's debut in the Argentina national basketball team was in the 2003 South American Basketball Championship held in Montevideo, against Chile. Lábaque also played the 1997 U-23 World Championship, 2003 PanAmerican Games and the 2004 South American Championship.

== Honours ==
=== Club ===
Atenas

- Liga Nacional de Básquet: (5): 1997-98, 1998–99, 2001–02, 2002–03, 2008–09
- Torneo Copa de Campeones(2): 1998, 1999
- Copa Argentina (1): 2008
- Torneo Super 8 (1): 2010
- Campeonato Panamericano (1): 1996
- Liga Sudamericana (2): 1997, 1998

=== Individual ===
- LNB All-Star 2002, 2003, 2007, 2009, 2011, 2015
- N° 7 retired by Atenas
