= Estadio Héctor Etchart =

Indoor stadium in Buenos Aires, Argentina

Héctor Etchart Arena
- Estadio Héctor Etchart
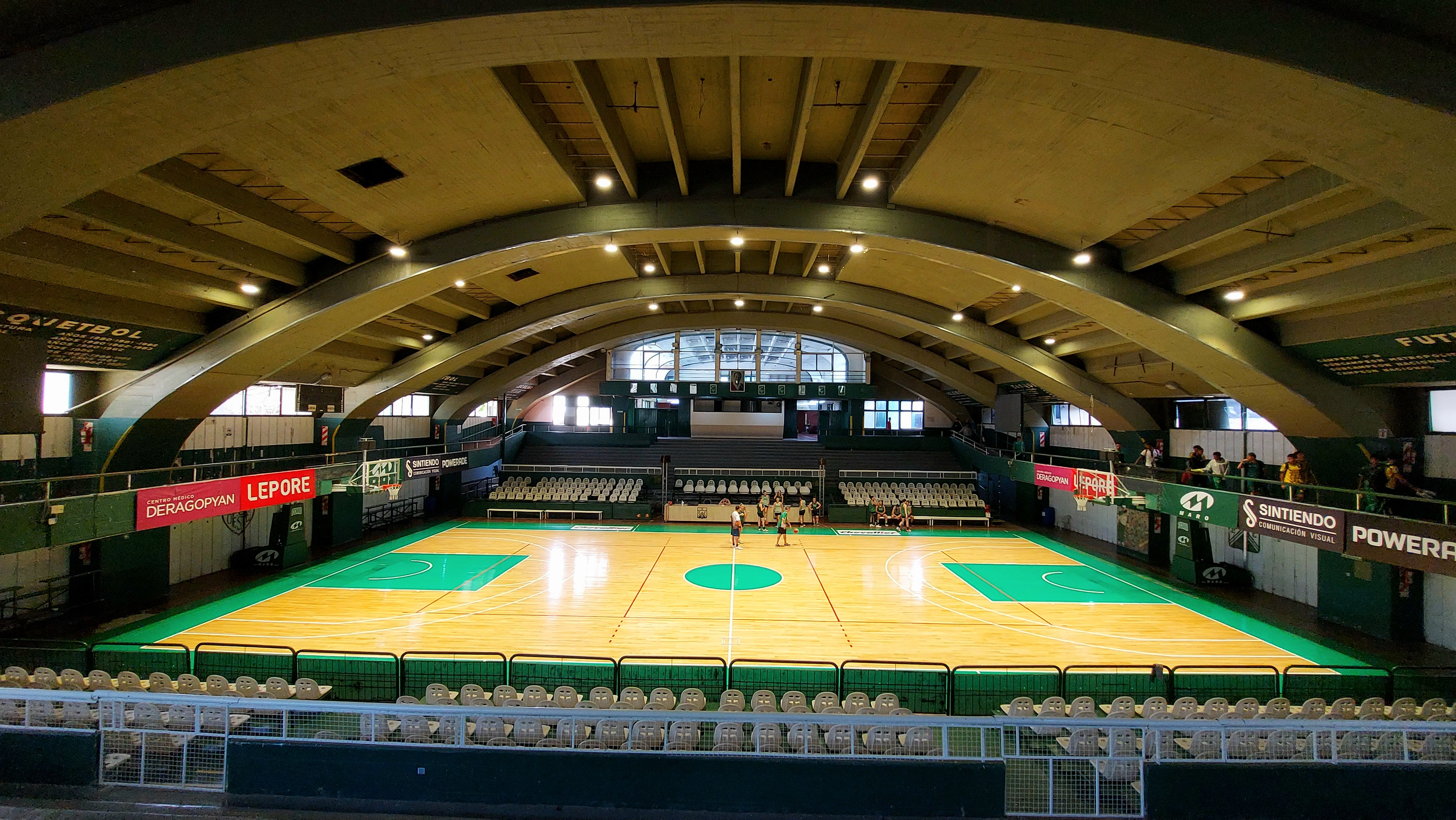
- The arena in 2024
- Interactive map of Héctor Etchart Arena
- Address: Av. Avellaneda 1240; Buenos Aires; Argentina
- Owner: Club Ferro Carril Oeste
- Operator: Club Ferro Carril Oeste
- Capacity: 4,500
- Type: Arena
- Current use: Basketball; Volleyball; Handball; Futsal

Construction
- Opened: 1972; 54 years ago
- Architect: Ricardo Etcheverri

Tenant
- Ferro Carril Oeste basketball

Estadio Héctor Etchart is an arena in the Caballito neighborhood of Buenos Aires, Argentina. Owned and operated by club Ferro Carril Oeste, the arena is located just below the south grandstand of Estadio Arquitecto Ricardo Etcheverri, serving as home venue to Ferro's basketball teams.

The arena was opened in October 1972 and named after Héctor Etchart (1889–1971), honorary member of the club that was part of its executive committee in several occasions. Etchart was also a tennis player for the club and served as president of the Argentine Tennis Association.

Héctor Etchart arena also serves as venue to other sports practised at the club such as volleyball, handball, and futsal.

== History ==
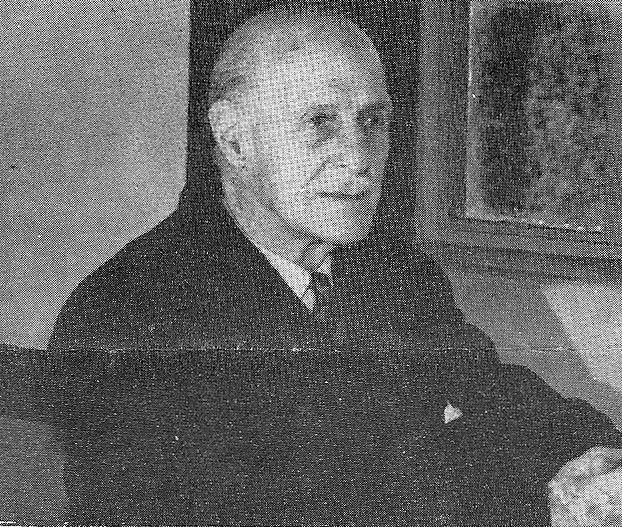
The arena was named after Héctor Etchart (pictured)

By 1967, Ferro's basketball team was about to return to the first division, and to achieve this, it needed a properly licensed gymnasium, which the club didn't have at the time. There wasn't enough space in the headquarters building for such a project, so the focus was on the football stadium, which also needed to be remodeled. Thus began the idea of building a gymnasium and a covered seating area.

A great deal of collaboration was required to undertake such projects, overcoming difficult times such as the football team's relegation to Primera División B in 1968.

After the stadium's inauguration on October 17, 1972, the first match played there was the "Pampero Doble Básquet" a friendly competition with Palmeiras and River Plate played each other. The championship crowned Olimpo de Bahía Blanca.

The arena was refurbished in 2024 after it had been severely damaged by a storm.

== Notable events ==
- Liga Nacional de Básquet finals: 1985, 1986, 1987, 1989
- 2005 Copa Argentina de Básquet
- 2014 LNB All-Star Game

== See also ==
- Ferro Carril Oeste (basketball)
