= Sebastián Vega (basketball) =

Argentine basketball player (born 1988)

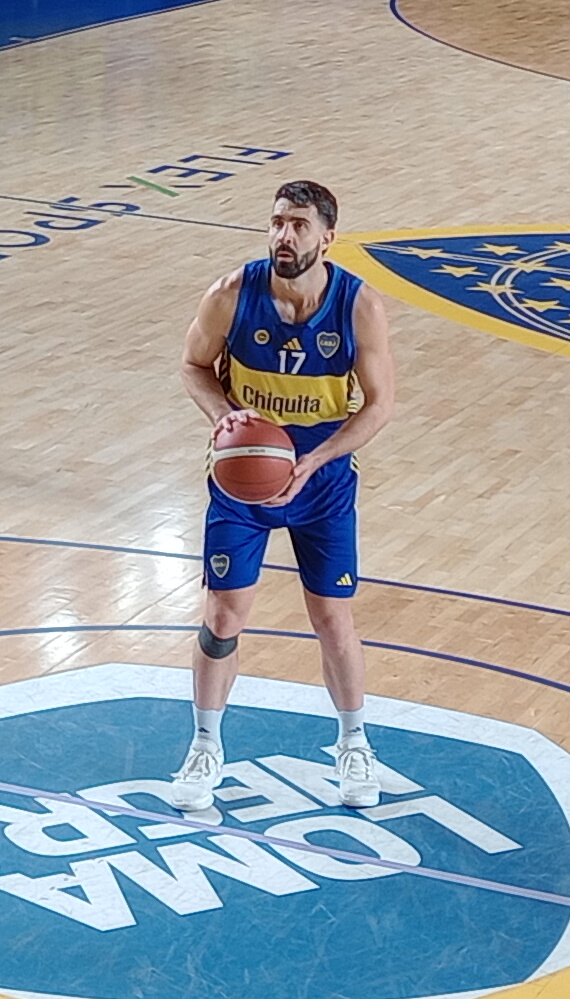

No. 17 – Boca Juniors
- Position: Small forward
- League: Liga Nacional de Básquet

Personal information
- Born: July 9, 1988 (age 38) Gualeguaychú, Argentina
- Listed height: 6 ft 7 in (2.01 m)

Career information
- Playing career: 2004–present

Career history
- 2004–2008: Central Entrerriano
- 2008–2010: Peñarol Mar del Plata
- 2010–2011: Boca Juniors
- 2011–2016: Quimsa
- 2016–2017: Libertad de Sunchales
- 2017–2018: Quimsa
- 2018–2022: Gimnasia y Esgrima de Comodoro Rivadavia
- 2022–2023: Unifacisa Basquete
- 2023–present: Boca Juniors
Medals
Men's basketball
Representing Argentina
FIBA South American Championship
Silver medal – second place	2010 Neiva

Sebastián Ernesto Vega (born July 9, 1988) is an Argentine professional basketball player for Boca Juniors, in the Liga Nacional de Básquet. At 6 feet 7 inches (2.01 m), he plays as a small forward.

He made his debut for Central Entrerriano in 2004, and later spent five years in Quimsa. Vega has played for Gimnasia y Esgrima since 2018. Vega has also played for the national basketball team, representing Argentina in the 2010 South American Basketball Championship.

== Professional career ==
Vega's debut was in 2004, for the local Central Entrerriano club in Gualeguaychú, Entre Ríos. He would later play for Peñarol de Mar del Plata from 2008 to 2010, and for Boca Juniors from 2010 to 2011. In 2011 he signed up for Quimsa, where he played until 2016. After a season in Libertad de Sunchales, he returned to Quimsa in 2017. In 2018, he began playing for Gimnasia y Esgrima de Comodoro Rivadavia.

Following a season at Unifacisa Basquete, in 2023 he signed once again with Boca Juniors. Vega has formed part of the Boca Juniors rosters that have won the 2023–24 and 2024–25 Liga Nacional de Básquetbol championships.

== National team career ==
Vega formed part of the Argentina men's basketball team at the 2005 South American Youth Championship, the 2006 American Youth Championship, and the 2007 U19 World Championship. In addition, he competed in the 2010 South American Championship in Neiva, Colombia.

== Personal life ==
Vega's sister, Gisela Vega, is also a professional basketball player currently playing for Quimsa. He is nicknamed "Monoco".

In 2020, Vega came out as gay through a post on his Twitter account, becoming the first professional basketball player in Argentina to do so. In 2022, during a game against Quimsa in Santiago del Estero, Vega was subject to homophobic slurs coming from the audience. The game was momentarily stopped and Quimsa was sanctioned by the LNB.

In 2017, he graduated with a technician's degree on labour relations from Universidad Siglo XXI.
