= Sebastián Ginóbili =

Argentine basketball coach

Club La Unión
- Position: Head coach
- League: Liga Nacional de Básquetbol

Personal information
- Born: 10 June 1972 (age 54) Bahía Blanca, Buenos Aires, Argentina
- Coaching career: 2013–present

Career history

Playing
- 1991–1996: Quilmes de Mar del Plata
- 1996–1997: Deportivo Roca
- 1997–1999: Estudiantes de Bahía Blanca
- 1999–2001: Quilmes de Mar del Plata
- 2001–2002: Estudiantes de Olavarría
- 2002–2004: Cantabria Baloncesto
- 2004–2006: Club Deportivo Libertad
- 2006–2007: Quilmes de Mar del Plata
- 2007–2012: Club Deportivo Libertad
- 2012: Bahiense del Norte

Coaching
- 2013–2019: Bahía Basket
- 2019–2021: Instituto
- 2021: Panteras de Aguascalientes
- 2022–: Club La Unión
- 2024: Plateros de Fresnillo

Sebastián Fernando Ginóbili (born 10 June 1972) is an Argentine basketball coach. He is the head coach of the Plateros de Fresnillo.

== Career ==
Ginóbili made his debut in the Argentine National Basketball League on September 22, 1991, wearing the Quilmes jersey in a game against his archrival Peñarol. He played five seasons with the Mar del Plata team before joining Deportivo Roca. In his only season with that club, he averaged 16.6 points, 3 rebounds, 4.7 assists, and 2 steals per game.

In 1997, he signed with Estudiantes de Bahía Blanca, where he played a season alongside his brother Emanuel Ginóbili. After one more year with the team, he agreed to return to Quilmes, which had moved back to the top division after competing in the National Promotion Tournament. He played two seasons at a high level, leading the team to the playoffs.

For the 2001–02 season, he moved to Estudiantes de Olavarría, while the point guard of that team, Daniel Farabello, joined Quilmes. They faced each other in the semifinal series. Playing very intensely, Ginóbili's team won 3-2 and advanced to the finals, where they were thoroughly beaten by Atenas de Córdoba.

After that, Ginóbili left Argentina to play for Lobos Cantabria in the LEB Oro, with the specific goal of returning the team to the ACB. However, in his two years there, he was unable to achieve that.

He returned to Argentina to begin what would be his first stint with Libertad, which lasted two years and ended with a runner-up finish in the 2005-06 LNB season.

In mid-2006, the point guard chose to return to Quilmes, a club where he was highly regarded. However, even though he had a relatively good season and finished as the LNB's leader in assists, he decided to part ways with the Mar del Plata team due to a salary dispute.

This led to his second stint with Libertad, from 2007 to 2012, which included two titles: the 2007 Super 8 Tournament and the 2007-08 LNB championship. He retired from the LNB after playing 935 games, scoring 10,791 points, and recording 3,223 assists. His final minutes as a player were spent with Bahiense del Norte, the club where he was trained, in the semi-professional First Division tournament of the Bahiense Basketball Association.

== Personal life ==
Sebastián Ginóbili is the brother of former basketball players Manu Ginóbili and Leandro Ginóbili. He played professionally with both: with Leandro during his early years at Quilmes and Deportivo Roca, and with Emanuel during his time at Estudiantes de Bahía Blanca.
