= Roberto Acuña (basketball) =

Argentine basketball player

No. 35 – Ciclista Olímpico
- Position: Center
- League: LNB

Personal information
- Born: September 14, 1990 (age 36) Rafaela, Santa Fe, Argentina
- Listed height: 6 ft 10 in (2.08 m)
- Listed weight: 240 lb (109 kg)

Career information
- NBA draft: 2012: undrafted
- Playing career: 2010–present

Career history
- 2010–2013: San Isidro
- 2013–2015: Ciclista Juninense
- 2015–2017: Peñarol
- 2017–2019: Quimsa
- 2019–2020: Gimnasia y Esgrima
- 2020–2021: San Lorenzo
- 2021–2022: Gimnasia y Esgrima
- 2022–present: Ciclista Olímpico

Roberto Acuña (born in Rafaela, September 14, 1990) is an Argentine professional basketball player, who plays with Ciclista Olímpico of Liga Nacional de Básquet (LNB).

== Professional career ==
In his pro career, Acuña has played with San Isidro, in the Argentine 2nd Division; and with Ciclista Juninense, Peñarol and Quimsa, in the Argentine 1st Division.

== National team career ==
Acuña has competed internationally as a member of the senior Argentina national basketball team: at the 2016 South American Championship, and at the 2016 Summer Olympics.
