= Gonzalo García (basketball) =

Argentine professional basketball coach (born 1967)

San Lorenzo
- Position: Head coach
- League: Liga Nacional de Básquetbol

Personal information
- Born: May 12, 1967 (age 59) San Martín, Buenos Aires, Argentina
- Coaching career: 1994–present

Career history

Coaching
- 1994–1999: Libertad de Sunchales
- 1999–2000: Deportivo San Andrés
- 2000–2004: Gimnasia y Esgrima La Plata
- 2004–2006: Libertad de Sunchales
- 2006–2007: Regatas Corrientes
- 2007–2008: Paysandú
- 2008–2009: Club Ciclista Olímpico
- 2011–2012: Flamengo
- 2012: Club La Unión
- 2012–2013: Club Atlético Obras Sanitarias
- 2013–2017: Gimnasia y Esgrima de Comodoro Rivadavia
- 2017–present: San Lorenzo

Career highlights
- As head coach: FIBA Americas League champion (2018); Argentine League champion (2018); Argentine Super 8 Cup winner (2005); Argentine Super 4 Cup winner (2015); 3× Argentine 2nd Division champion (1998, 2001, 2008); Argentine 3rd Division champion (1996)

Gonzalo Eugenio García (born May 12, 1967) is an Argentine professional basketball coach, currently the head coach at San Lorenzo of the Liga Nacional de Básquetbol.

== Coaching career ==
=== Pro clubs ===
García was the head coach of Gimnasia-Indalo Esgr.Comodoro Rivadavia, of Argentina’s top-tier level Liga Nacional de Básquet (LNB), from 2009 to 2017. In 2017, García was named Argentina’s co-basketball coach of the year.

=== National teams ===
García has worked as an assistant coach of the senior Argentine national basketball team.
