= Will Graves =

American basketball player (born 1988)

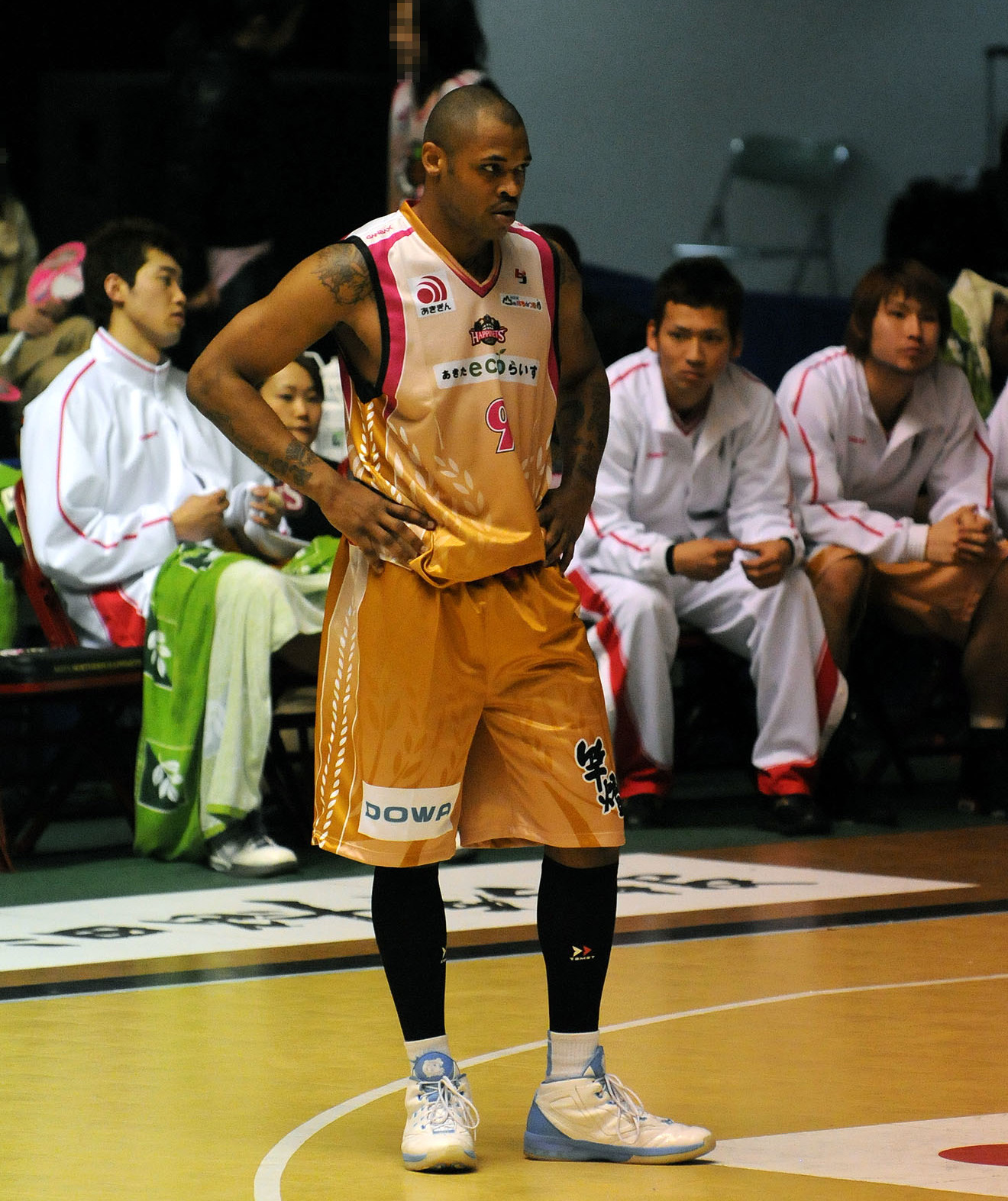
- Graves with Hapoel Haifa in 2018

Personal information
- Born: May 15, 1988 (age 38) Greensboro, North Carolina, U.S.
- Listed height: 6 ft 6 in (1.98 m)
- Listed weight: 234 lb (106 kg)

Career information
- High school: James B. Dudley (Greensboro, North Carolina)
- College: North Carolina (2007–2010)
- Playing career: 2011–2020
- Position: Small forward / power forward

Career history
- 2011: Akita Northern Happinets
- 2011–2012: Boca Juniors
- 2012: Marinos de Anzoátegui
- 2012–2014: Club Deportivo Libertad
- 2013: Club Malvín
- 2014: Keflavík
- 2014–2017: Maccabi Haifa
- 2019: FC Porto
- 2019–2020: APOEL B.C.

Career highlights
- Israeli League All-Star (2016); North Carolina Mr. Basketball (2006)

William Thomas Graves (born May 15, 1988) is an American former basketball player. He played college basketball for North Carolina before playing professionally in Japan, Argentina, Venezuela, Iceland, Israel and Portugal.

== Early life and college career ==
Graves attended James B. Dudley High School in Greensboro, North Carolina, where he averaged 25.1 points and shooting 44 percent from beyond the arc, leading the team to two state championships. Graves was named North Carolina High School Player of the Year in 2006.

Graves played three years of college basketball for the University of North Carolina. He averaged 9.8 points and 4.6 rebounds in his junior year.

== College statistics ==
Year	Team	GP	GS	MPG	FG%	3P%	FT%	RPG	APG	SPG	BPG	PPG
2007–08	North Carolina	36	0	5.2	.391	.442	.583	1.44	0.33	0.14	0.08	2.22
2008–09	North Carolina	23	0	10.5	.427	.263	.889	2.30	0.70	0.30	0.09	3.57
2009–10	North Carolina	36	34	24.2	.366	.371	.806	4.64	0.89	0.64	0.19	3.81
Career		95	34	13.7	.380	.367	.783	2.86	0.63	0.37	0.13	5.42

== Professional career ==
=== Early years (2011–2014) ===
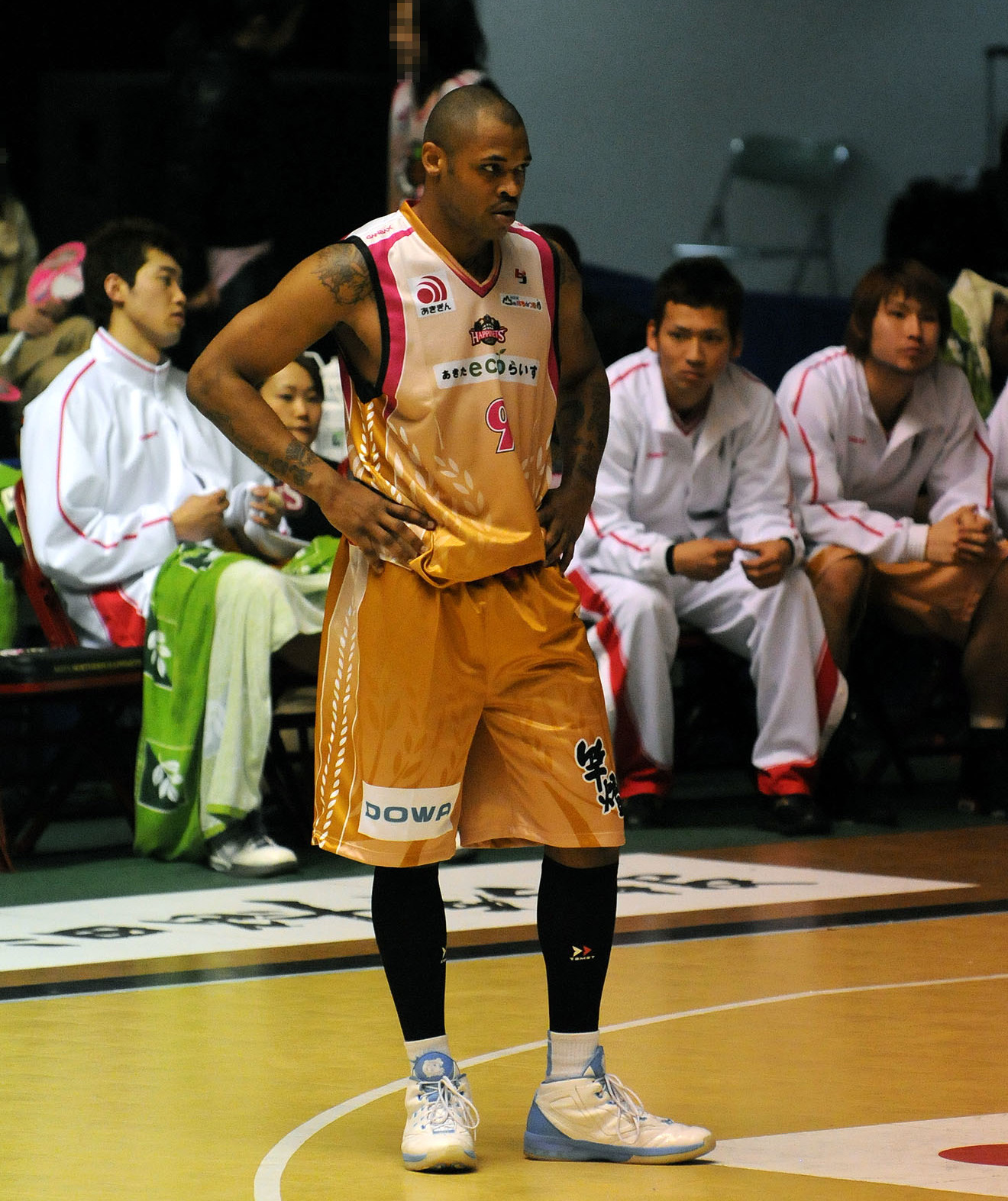
Graves with the Akita Northern Happinets in 2011

On February 10, 2011, Graves signed with the Akita Northern Happinets of Japan and started his professional career. Over the next few seasons, he played for Boca Juniors (2011–2012), Marinos de Anzoátegui (2012), Club Deportivo Libertad (2012–2014) and Club Malvín (2013).

=== Iceland (2014) ===
On October 6, 2014, Graves signed with Keflavík of the Icelandic Úrvalsdeild. On November 13, 2014, Graves recorded a career-high 39 points, shooting 15-of-26 from the field, along with six rebounds, six assists and three blocks in a 87–82 win over ÍR Reykjavíkur. In 10 games played for Keflavík, he averaged 22.9 points and 8 rebounds per game.

=== Israel (2014–2018) ===
On December 17, 2014, Graves parted ways with Keflavík to join the Israeli team Maccabi Haifa for the rest of the season. On March 25, 2016, Graves participated in the 2016 Israeli League All-Star Game. In his second season with Maccabi Haifa, Graves helped the team reach the 2016 Israeli League Playoffs as the third seed, but they eventually lost to Maccabi Rishon LeZion in the Quarterfinals.

On February 27, 2017, Graves recorded an Israeli League career-high 34 points, shooting 12-of-20 from the field, along with eight rebounds in a 96–97 loss to Maccabi Tel Aviv. On April 20, 2017, Graves suffered a season-ending injury in a match against Maccabi Tel Aviv.

On August 4, 2017, Graves signed a one-year contract extension with Maccabi Haifa. However, on November 5, 2017, Graves parted ways with Haifa after playing three seasons with the team.

On August 8, 2018, Graves signed a one-year deal with Hapoel Haifa of the Israeli National League. However, on October 24, 2018, he parted ways with Hapoel Haifa before appearing in an official game for them.

=== Portugal (2019–2020) ===
On February 27, 2019, Graves signed with the Portuguese team FC Porto for the rest of the season. In 20 games played for Porto, he averaged 13 points, 6.1 rebounds and 1.1 assists per game. Graves helped the team reach the Portuguese League Semifinals, where they eventually fell short to Benfica.

== Musical endeavour ==
In his off-court life, Graves is a rapper, who has published original songs under the recording name Willy G.

== Career statistics ==
Legend
GP	Games played	GS	Games started	MPG	Minutes per game
FG%	Field goal percentage	3P%	3-point field goal percentage	FT%	Free throw percentage
RPG	Rebounds per game	APG	Assists per game	SPG	Steals per game
BPG	Blocks per game	PPG	Points per game	**Bold**	Career high

=== Regular season ===
Year	Team	GP	GS	MPG	FG%	3P%	FT%	RPG	APG	SPG	BPG	PPG
2010–11	Akita	16	15	32.1	.388	.348	.741	11.2	1.7	0.8	0.3	22.2
2011–12	Boca	39	38	28.9	.386	.261	.865	6.28	0.92	0.59	0.26	10.74
2011–12	Marinos	11	4	20.9	.411	.389	.778	2.91	0.82	0.73	0.36	9.27
2011–12	Libertad	11	11	33.2	.414	.362	.723	8.64	1.36	0.64	0.00	15.91
2012–13	Libertad	31	22	25.9	.448	.409	.821	5.39	0.77	0.52	0.16	12.87
2012–13	Malvin	12		33.6	.442	.301	.808	7.3	2.2	0.8	0.3	16.3
2013–14	Libertad	12	4	13.7	.365	.414	.600	2.83	0.58	0.25	0.33	5.08
2014–15	Keflavík	10	10	31.3	.445	.349	.659	8.00	2.80	1.00	1.20	22.90
2014–15	Haifa	23	3	25.7	.413	.410	.750	4.70	1.22	0.30	0.17	12.61
2015–16	Haifa	31	23	28.6	.372	.325	.761	4.65	1.26	0.84	0.42	11.61
2016–17	Haifa	28	7	24.3	.416	.415	.771	4.29	1.14	0.57	0.46	11.11
2017–18	Haifa	5	2	20.6	.185	.071	1.000	2.00	0.40	0.40	0.00	2.40
2018–19	Porto	20	18	24.6	.395	.324	.691	6.15	1.15	0.55	0.40	13.00

=== Playoffs ===
Year	Team	GP	GS	MPG	FG%	3P%	FT%	RPG	APG	SPG	BPG	PPG
2010–11	Akita	2		27.0	.333	.286	.500	10.0	0.5	0.0	0.0	13.5
2011–12	Libertad	8		34.1	.407	.300	.769	9.6	1.3	0.8	0.0	17.1
2014–15	Haifa	3		17.0	.381	.273	.571	4.3	1.3	0.0	0.0	7.7
2015–16	Haifa	5		33.8	.382	.250	.850	4.0	1.6	1.2	0.6	15.6
