= Julio Lamas =

Argentine basketball coach

Personal information
- Born: June 9, 1964 (age 62) Buenos Aires, Argentina
- Coaching career: 1987–present

Career history

Coaching
- 1987–1988: S.C. Cañadense (assistant)
- 1988–1992: S.C. Cañadense
- 1992–1995: Venado Tuerto
- 1995–1997: Boca Juniors
- 1999–2000: Saski Baskonia
- 2000–2001: Obras Sanitarias
- 2001–2003: Lucentum Alicante
- 2003–2004: Real Madrid
- 2004–2007: Ben Hur Rafaela
- 2007–2009: Libertad Sunchales
- 2014–2015: Obras Sanitarias
- 2015–2017: San Lorenzo de Almagro

Career highlights
- As head coach: 2× FIBA South American League champion (2006, 2011); InterLeagues Tournament champion (2011); 5× Argentine League champion (1997, 2005, 2008, 2016, 2017); 7× Argentine League Coach of the Year (1991, 1997, 2005–2008, 2011); Spanish 2nd Division champion (2002); Spanish 2nd Division Cup winner (2002)
Medals
Men's basketball
Representing Argentina
FIBA AmeriCup
Bronze medal – third place	1999 Puerto Rico
Gold medal – first place	2011 Argentina
Bronze medal – third place	2013 Venezuela
FIBA South American Championship
Silver medal – second place	1999 Argentina
Gold medal – first place	2012 Argentina

Julio César Lamas (born June 9, 1964) is an Argentine professional basketball coach. He was head coach of the Japan men's national team from 2017 to 2021. He has also been the head coach of the Argentina men's national team.

== Club coaching career ==
=== Argentina ===
Lamas has won 5 Argentine League championships, in 1997 with Boca Juniors, in 2005 with Ben Hur, in 2008 with Libertad de Sunchales, and in 2016 and 2017, with San Lorenzo de Almagro. He also won the FIBA South American League with Ben Hur in 2006.

=== Spain ===
Lamas also coached in Spain. He coached in the Spanish League with Tau Cerámica (1999–2000), and in the Spanish 2nd Division with Lucentum Alicante, with which he won the Spanish 2nd Division league championship, and the Spanish 2nd tier cup competition, the Copa Príncipe, in 2002. He also coached in the Spanish League with Real Madrid (2003–2004).

== National team coaching career ==
=== Argentina national team ===
Lamas was the head coach of the senior men's Argentina national basketball team at the 1998 FIBA World Cup. He was also the assistant coach to Sergio Hernández on the Argentine 2008 Summer Olympics team that won the bronze medal. On December 16, 2010, his return to the head coach position of the Argentina national team was officially announced, as he replaced Sergio Hernández.

He, as head coach of Argentina, brought home a gold medal from the 2011 FIBA AmeriCup, coached the defenders of Argentina at the 2012 Summer Olympics, brought home bronze medal from the 2013 FIBA AmeriCup, and coached the defenders of Argentina at the 2014 FIBA World Cup.

=== Japan national team ===
Lamas became the head coach of the senior Japan men's national basketball team in 2017. In 2019, the team appeared in the 2019 FIBA World Cup, the first time the team had made it to the World Cup in 13 years.

On September 21, 2021, he announced that he would be stepping down following a contract expiration.
