= Charles Jones (basketball, born 1975) =

American basketball player

Personal information
- Born: July 17, 1975 (age 51) Brooklyn, New York, U.S.
- Listed height: 6 ft 3 in (1.91 m)
- Listed weight: 180 lb (82 kg)

Career information
- High school: Bishop Ford Central Catholic (Brooklyn, New York)
- College: Rutgers (1993–1995); LIU Brooklyn (1996–1998)
- NBA draft: 1998: undrafted
- Playing career: 1999–2010
- Position: Point guard / shooting guard
- Number: 11, 2

Career history
- 1999: Chicago Bulls
- 1999–2000: Los Angeles Clippers
- 2000–2001: BingoSNAI Montecatini
- 2001–2002: Ionikos Egnatia Bank
- 2003: Brooklyn Kings
- 2003: Maccabi Rishon LeZion
- 2003–2004: Libertad de Sunchales
- 2004–2005: PBC Lukoil Academic
- 2005: Albany Patroons
- 2005–2006: Gimnasia y Esgrima de Comodoro Rivadavia
- 2006: Long Island Primetime
- 2006–2008: Gimnasia y Esgrima de Comodoro Rivadavia
- 2008: Ciclista Olímpico
- 2009: BC Levski Sofia
- 2010: Gimnasia y Esgrima de Comodoro Rivadavia

Career highlights
- Bulgarian League champion (2005); Bulgarian Cup champion (2009); Liga Nacional de Básquet champion (2006); Liga Nacional de Básquet Allstar (2006, 2007); 2× NCAA scoring champion (1997, 1998); Haggerty Award winner (1997); 2× NEC Player of the Year (1997, 1998); 2× First-team All-NEC (1997, 1998); Second team All-America Adidas Blue Ribbon (1997-1998); Second team NABC (1997-1998)
- Stats at NBA.com
- Stats at Basketball Reference

Charles Rahmel Jones (born July 17, 1975) is an American former professional basketball player who played in the National Basketball Association (NBA) for the Chicago Bulls and Los Angeles Clippers.

== Biography ==
Raised in Bedford–Stuyvesant, Brooklyn, New York, Jones was one of two children of Charles and Cathy Jones and graduated from Bishop Ford Central Catholic High School in 1993. His brother Lamont Jones is also a basketball player. In 1997, Jones estimated to The New York Times that around 15 of his friends from Bedford-Stuyvesant were killed on the streets. He played at The Soul in the Hole in Brooklyn.

Jones attended Rutgers University and Long Island University, before spending two seasons in the NBA for the Chicago Bulls (1998–99) and the Los Angeles Clippers (1999–2000). He would later decline a contracts before signing in Italy. Due to a fracture of his shooting hand, he would continue to play abroad despite never receiving therapy, notable stops in Greece, Bulgaria & Argentina. When League & cup titles in Bulgaria & a league title in Argentina

While playing for Long Island University, he led the league in scoring during the 1996–97 and 1997–98 seasons. In the 1996–97 season he averaged 30.1 points per game, becoming the last player to average at least 30 points in a season until Marcus Keene reached that mark in 2016–17. During his senior season he ranked among the top ten in NCAA Division I men's basketball in several categories, finishing fifth in assists and ninth in steals while leading his conference in points per game, assists per game, and steals per game. He set several school and conference records for scoring and remains among the most statistically productive players in the program’s history.
