= Liga Nacional de Básquetbol =

Argentine basketball top division

- Organising body: Asociación de Clubes de Básquetbol
- Founded: 1985; 41 years ago by León Najnudel
- Country: Argentina
- Number of teams: 20
- Level on pyramid: 1
- Relegation to: La Liga Argentina
- International cup: Champions League Americas
- Current champions: Gimnasia y Esgrima (CR) (2nd title) (2025–26)
- Most championships: Atenas (9 titles)
- Most appearances: Leonardo Gutiérrez (1,106)
- All-time top scorer: Héctor Campana (17,359)
- President: Eduardo Tassano
- TV partners: TyC Sports; DSports
- Website: laliganacional.com.ar

The Liga Nacional de Básquetbol (abbreviated LNB, and literally in English, "National Basketball League"), also commonly referred to as "La Liga de Básquet" ("The Basketball League"), is the top-tier level of the Argentine basketball league system. The league is under the auspices of the Basketball Clubs' Association (in Spanish: Asociación de Clubes de Básquetbol). The LNB's predecessor league is the now defunct Campeonato Argentino de Clubes, which was organized by the Argentine Basketball Confederation.

The league was created through the efforts of basketball coach León Najnudel, and sports journalist Osvaldo Orcasitas, in the 1980s, to make Argentine men's club basketball more competitive, through the merging of the many existing local leagues. It is designed like the NBA, with a regular season, all-star game, and playoffs. However, unlike the NBA, the LNB has a promotion and relegation system, with the La Liga Argentina (LLA), the league level that is immediately below the LNB.

A tribute to Najnudel's vision, is the string of successes of the senior men's Argentine national basketball team, culminating with the team's Summer Olympic Games gold medal won at the 2004 Summer Olympics, and the international careers of many players who started in the league.

== History ==
=== Creation ===
Before the league was established, the regular tournament was Campeonato Argentino de Clubes where teams from all the provinces took part. The league had a regional format and playoffs.

For the 1984 edition there was 64 teams. The association decided to retire 10 teams, moving them to "Primera Nacional A". Of those teams, 4 were from city of Buenos Aires, and the provinces of Buenos Aires, Córdoba and Santa Fe were represented by 2 teams each.

As a result, a number of 54 teams played the Argentino de clubes. At the end of the tournament, the six best placed team would promote to Primera A, and the rest of the clubs would be relegated to Primera B (second division).

=== First seasons ===
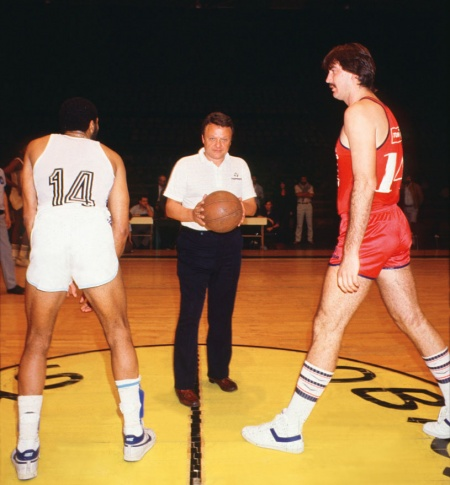
León Najnudel with the ball in the first LNB game ever: Argentino de Firmat v. San Lorenzo (in red uniform), 26 April 1985

The first edition of Liga Nacional was played within 1985, with 16 teams participating although Independiente de Tucumán abandoned the championship for economic reasons. The first game was played on April 26, 1985, when San Lorenzo de Almagro faced Argentino de Firmat at Estadio Obras Sanitarias.

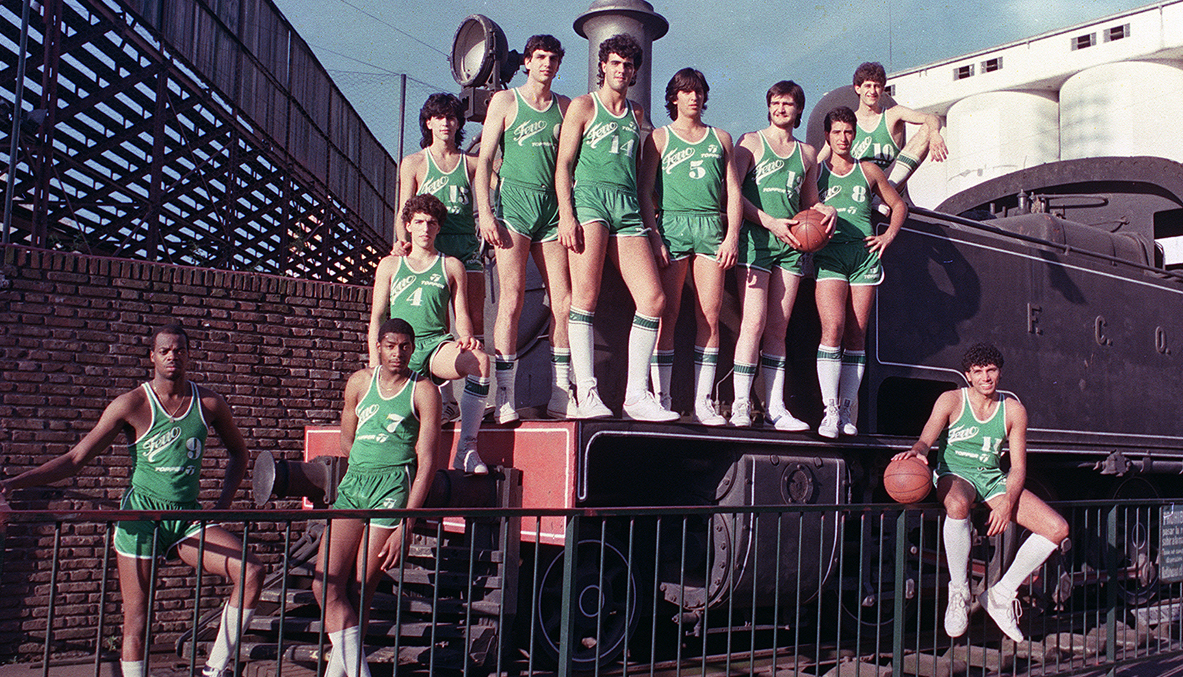
Ferro Carril Oeste, the first champion of the LNB

Ferro Carril Oeste was the first LNB champion after defeating Atenas de Córdoba in 3 games. The next season (1986), Ferro Carril Oeste won its second consecutive title, beating Olimpo de Bahía Blanca in 5 games (3–1 on aggregate). The Verdolaga played its third consecutive final series in 1987, but was finally defeated by Atenas, that won the first of 9 titles, being the most winning LNB team to date.

In 1988 Atenas won a second championship beating River Plate and the next year Ferro won another title, being the only title won by León Najnudel as coach.

== Competition format ==
Following a system similar to the European basketball leagues, the Liga Nacional features promotion and relegation. Contested by 20 teams, the top division is divided in two stages: the first one consists of a double round-robin competition, with standings decided by a points system. At the end of the season, teams placed 1st to 16th advance to the playoffs, while the last 2 teams play a series to avoid relegation.

The playoffs stage is divided in four parts, where winning teams qualify to the next stage while defeated teams retire from the tournament. The successive stages are quarter finals, semi-finals and the finals. Quarter and semi-finals are played in a 2-2-1 format (best-of-five) while finals are played in a 2-2-1-1-1 format, which rounds are best-of-seven series.

== Clubs (2026–27 season) ==
Club	City	Province	Arena	Capacity	Est.
Argentino	Junín	Buenos Aires	El Fortín de las Morochas	1,465	1935
Atenas	Córdoba	Córdoba	Carlos Cerutti	3,500	1938
Boca Juniors	Buenos Aires	(autonomous city)	Luis Conde	2,000	1905
Ciclista Olímpico	La Banda	Santiago del Estero	Vicente Rosales	3,964	1921
Ferro Carril Oeste	Buenos Aires	(autonomous city)	Héctor Etchart	4,500	1904
Gimnasia y Esgrima	Comodoro Rivadavia	Chubut	Socios Fundadores	2,276	1919
Independiente [es]	Oliva	Córdoba	El Gigante	1,800	1921
Instituto	Córdoba	Córdoba	Angel Sandrin	2,000	1918
Lanús	Lanús	Buenos Aires	Microestadio Antonio Rotili [es]	3,000	1915
Oberá Tenis Club	Oberá	Misiones	Dr. Luis Augusto Derna	2,000	1940
Peñarol	Mar del Plata	Buenos Aires	Islas Malvinas	8,000	1922
Platense	Florida	Buenos Aires	Microestadio Vicente López (Note: The team plays its home games at Obras Sanitarias stadium, with capacity for 3,000 spectators.)	800	1905
Quimsa	Santiago del Estero	Santiago del Estero	Estadio Ciudad	5,200	1989
Racing Club [es]	Chivilcoy	Buenos Aires	Grilon Arena	1,200	1914
Regatas	Corrientes	Corrientes	José Jorge Contte	4,000	1923
San Lorenzo	Buenos Aires	(autonomous city)	Roberto Pando	2,700	1908
San Martín	Corrientes	Corrientes	Raúl A. Ortiz	2,500	1932
La Unión	Formosa	Formosa	Cincuentenario	4,500	2004
Unión	Santa Fe	Santa Fe	Ángel Malvicino	5,000	1907

== Champions ==
=== List of finals ===
Ed.	Season	Champion	Series	Runner-up	Winning Coach	Finals MVP
1	1985	Ferro Carril Oeste (1)	2–1	Atenas	Luis Martínez [es]	Sebastián Uranga [es]
2	1986	Ferro Carril Oeste (2)	3–1	Olimpo	Luis Martínez	Mike Schlegel
3	1987	Atenas (1)	3–1	Ferro Carril Oeste	Walter Garrone [es]	Héctor Campana
4	1988	Atenas (2)	3–0	River Plate	Walter Garrone	Carlos Cerutti
5	1989	Ferro Carril Oeste (3)	3–2	Atenas	León Najnudel	Jim Thomas
6	1990	Atenas (3)	3–0	Cañadense	Walter Garrone	Marcelo Milanesio
7	1990–91	GEPU (1)	4–2	Estudiantes (BB)	Daniel Rodríguez	Héctor Campana
8	1991–92	Atenas (4)	4–1	GEPU	Rubén Magnano	Héctor Campana
9	1992–93	GEPU (2)	4–2	Atenas	Orlando Ferratto	Juan Espil
10	1993–94	Peñarol (MDP) (1)	4–1	Independiente (GP)	Nestor García	Esteban De la Fuente
11	1994–95	Independiente (GP) (1)	4–1	Olimpia (VT)	Mario Guzmán	Esteban De la Fuente
12	1995–96	Olimpia (VT) (1)	4–3	Atenas	Horacio Seguí	Jorge Racca
13	1996–97	Boca Juniors (1)	4–1	Independiente (GP)	Julio Lamas	Byron Wilson
14	1997–98	Atenas (5)	4–0	Boca Juniors	Rubén Magnano	Fabricio Oberto
15	1998–99	Atenas (6)	4–3	Independiente (GP)	Rubén Magnano	Diego Osella
16	1999–00	Estudiantes (O) (1)	4–3	Atenas	Sergio Hernández	Rubén Wolkowyski
17	2000–01	Estudiantes (O) (2)	4–1	Libertad	Sergio Hernández	Byron Wilson
18	2001–02	Atenas (7)	4–1	Estudiantes (O)	Horacio Seguí	Walter Herrmann
19	2002–03	Atenas (8)	4–2	Boca Juniors	Oscar Sánchez	Diego Lo Grippo
20	2003–04	Boca Juniors (2)	4–2	Gimnasia y Esgrima (LP)	Sergio Hernández	Byron Wilson
21	2004–05	Ben Hur (1)	4–1	Boca Juniors	Julio Lamas	Leonardo Gutiérrez
22	2005–06	Gimnasia y Esgrima (CR) (1)	4–2	Libertad	Fernando Duró [es]	Gabriel Cocha [es]
23	2006–07	Boca Juniors (3)	4–2	Peñarol	Gabriel Piccato [es]	Leonardo Gutiérrez
24	2007–08	Libertad (1)	4–0	Quimsa	Julio Lamas	Laron Profit
25	2008–09	Atenas (9)	4–2	Peñarol	Rubén Magnano	Andre Laws [es]
26	2009–10	Peñarol (MDP) (2)	4–1	Atenas	Sergio Hernández	Leonardo Gutiérrez
27	2010–11	Peñarol (MDP) (3)	4–1	Atenas	Sergio Hernández	Leonardo Gutiérrez
28	2011–12	Peñarol (MDP) (4)	4–2	Obras Sanitarias	Sergio Hernández	Facundo Campazzo
29	2012–13	Regatas (C)	4–0	Lanús	Nicolás Casalánguida	Paolo Quinteros
30	2013–14	Peñarol (MDP) (5)	4–2	Regatas	Fernando Rivero	Facundo Campazzo
31	2014–15	Quimsa (1)	4–2	Gimnasia y Esgrima (CR)	Silvio Santander	Robert Battle
32	2015–16	San Lorenzo (1)	4–0	La Unión	Julio Lamas	Walter Herrmann
33	2016–17	San Lorenzo (2)	4–1	Regatas	Julio Lamas	Gabriel Deck
34	2017–18	San Lorenzo (3)	4–2	San Martín (C)	Gonzalo García	Gabriel Deck
35	2018–19	San Lorenzo (4)	4–3	Instituto (C)	Gonzalo García	Dar Tucker
36	2019–20	(season unfinished due to the COVID-19 pandemic)				
37	2020–21	San Lorenzo (5)	3–2	Quimsa	Silvio Santander	José Vildoza
38	2021–22	Instituto (C) (1)	3–1	Quimsa	Lucas Victoriano	Martín Cuello [es]
39	2022–23	Quimsa (2)	4–1	Boca Juniors	Leandro Ramella	Eric Anderson
40	2023–24	Boca Juniors (4)	4–2	Instituto (C)	Gonzalo Pérez	José Vildoza
41	2024–25	Boca Juniors (5)	4–3	Instituto (C)	Gonzalo Pérez	José Vildoza
42	2025–26	Gimnasia y Esgrima (CR) (2)	4–2	Quimsa	Pablo Favarel	Seba Carrasco [es]

Source: Básquet Plus

=== Titles by club ===
Club	Titles	Years won
Atenas	9	1987, 1988, 1990, 1991–92, 1997–98, 1998–99, 2001–02, 2002–03, 2008–09
Peñarol	5	1993–94, 2009–10, 2010–11, 2011–12, 2013–14
Boca Juniors	5	1996–97, 2003–04, 2006–07, 2023–24, 2024–25
San Lorenzo	5	2015–16, 2016–17, 2017–18, 2018–19, 2020–21
Ferro Carril Oeste	3	1985, 1986, 1989
GEPU	2	1990–91, 1992–93
Estudiantes (O)	2	1999–2000, 2000–01
Quimsa	2	2014–15, 2022–23
Gimnasia y Esgrima (CR)	2	2005–06, 2025-26
Independiente	1	1994–95
Olimpia	1	1995–96
Ben Hur	1	2004–05
Libertad	1	2007–08
Regatas Corrientes	1	2012–13
Instituto	1	2021–22

== Awards ==
These are the yearly individual awards are given by the league as a recognition to the most valuable player (in both, regular season and finals) and the top scorer. Leonardo Gutiérrez was chosen finals MVP a record of 4 times, while Joe Bunn is the most times top scorer (5 seasons).

== Retired numbers ==
As of July 2025, 18 players have their jerseys retired. Atenas was the team which started this practice (in 2002, with legendary Marcelo Milanesio's #9).

N°	Club	Player	Pos.	Tenure	No. ret. year	Ref.
4	Quilmes (MdP)	(Argentina) Eduardo Dominé	SG	1990, 1991–2001	2009	
5	Atenas	(Argentina) Héctor Campana	SG	1987–88, 1991–92, 1996–2000, 2002–04	2005	
5	Estudiantes (BB) (Note: Number retired for both teams, as Bahía Basket was recognised as a continuity of Estudiantes in the LNB.)	(Argentina) Hernán Jasen	SF	1996–99, 2012–18	2018	
7	Quilmes (MdP)	(Argentina) Esteban De la Fuente	SG	1991–93, 1995–97, 2004–05	2013	
7	Atenas	(Argentina) Bruno Lábaque	PG	1994–2003, 2006–09, 2010–17	2017	
7	Gimnasia y Esgrima (CR)	(Argentina) Pablo Moldú	SG	1994–2006	2019	
7	Quimsa	(Argentina) Nicolás Aguirre	PG	2011–13, 2014–15	2019	
8	Peñarol (MdP)	(Argentina) Tato Rodríguez	PG	1994–1998, 1999–2003, 2004–2011	2011	
8	Quilmes (MdP)	(Argentina) Guillermo García Oyaga	PG	1970s–80s	2013	
8	Gimnasia y Esgrima (CR)	(Argentina) Gabriel Cocha	SG	1991–92, 1994–98, 2003–07	2019	
8	Quimsa	(Argentina) Fernando Small	PG	1998–2004, 2005–08	2019	
9	Atenas	(Argentina) Marcelo Milanesio	PG	1982–2002	2002	
10	Estudiantes (BB)	(Argentina) Juan Espil	SG	1988–1992, 2010–12	2013	
11	Atenas	(Argentina) Diego Osella	C	1988–1992, 1993–2001, 2003–2010	2011	
11	Quimsa	(Argentina) Miguel Cortijo	PG	1998–2000	2011	
13	Regatas Corrientes	(Argentina) Paolo Quinteros	SG	2011–22	SG	
14	Estudiantes (BB)	(Argentina) Alberto Cabrera (Note: Although Cabrera did not play for Bahía Basket (he left basketball in 1984), the number 14 is also retired in the franchise.)	PG	1961–84	2004	
14	Quimsa	(Argentina) Gabriel Deck	SF	2010–16	2019	

== See also ==
- LNB All-Star Game
