= Gimnasia y Esgrima de Comodoro Rivadavia =

Basketball team

Gimnasia y Esgrima (CR)
- Nickname: El Verde (The Green)
- Leagues: Liga Nacional de Básquet; Liga Sudamericana
- Founded: 13 February 1919; 106 years ago
- Arena: Estadio Socios Fundadores (capacity: 2,276)
- Location: Comodoro Rivadavia, Chubut Province, Argentina
- President: Juan Pablo Luque
- Head coach: Gonzalo García
- Championships: 1 Liga Nacional de Básquet
- Website: gimnasiacomodoro.com
Home	Away

Club Gimnasia y Esgrima de Comodoro Rivadavia is an Argentine basketball and team handball club based in the city of Comodoro Rivadavia in Chubut Province. The basketball team currently plays in the Liga Nacional de Básquet, the top level of the Argentine league system. Its home arena is the Estadio Socios Fundadores.

== History ==
A group of inhabitants of Comodoro Rivadavia (most of them with Spanish ancestors) established Club Gimnasia y Esgrima on February 13, 1919. Eloy Cánovas was elected president of the club although the club was registered 20 years later. At the beginning, Gimnasia was a social club rather a sports institution. Gimnasia was first based on España street, moving then to San Martín street of the same city.

Gimnasia y Esgrima organized the traditional "Maratón de los Barrios" (Marathon of the neighborhoods) for the first time in 1942. This competition was one of the most notable running events in Comodoro Rivadavia. The club was also a tennis pioneer in the city, apart from many sports activities hosted by the club, such as athletics, football, rugby union, fencing, roller hockey, martial arts, chess, roller coaster and volleyball.

The club inaugurated its headquarters on San Martín street in 1953, being erected for over 50 years. Due to serious economic problems, Gimnasia had to sell the building in 1994, causing that all the sports departments of the club (with the exception of basketball) were closed.

Basketball began to be practised at Gimnasia in 1930. The club won its first Chubut Basketball Federation championship in 1941. The club later registered to Liga Nacional de Básquetbol where it still competes. In 1985 Gimnasia y Esgrima inaugurated its own stadium, named "Socios Fundadores" (Founding Members). Four years later Gimnasia won the second division title, therefore promoting to the top level, just two weeks before the end of the championship.

During the 1992–93 season Gimnasia y Esgrima (coached by León Najnudel) finished 4th in the Liga Nacional. Another great campaign was in the 1999–00 season when the team finished 3rd. This performance allowed Gimnasia to play the Liga Sudamericana de Clubes (South American championship), being the first time a team from Patagonia played an international competition. Gimnasia y Esgrima was a finalist, finally losing to Estudiantes de Olavarría.

Nevertheless, the most important achievement to date was the Primera División championship won in 2005–06. The team, coached by Fernando Duró, defeated Libertad de Sunchales by 4–2 at the finals. Previously, Gimnasia had eliminated Boca Juniors and Ben Hur. The roster was: Sebastián Festa, Santiago Haag, Nicolás de los Santos, Gabriel Cocha, Pablo Moldú, Charles Jones, Leandro Masieri, Matías Barberis, Jervaughn Scales, Ruperto Herrera, Diego Romero and Bruce Zabukovic. Cocha was also named MVP of the finals.

In July 2011, Grupo Indalo (a group of companies based on Comodoro Rivadavia) associated with the club, which changed its name to "Gimnasia Indalo" before the 2011–12 season. Marcelo Richotti came back as coach of the team.

== Players ==
=== Current roster ===
Gimnasia y Esgrima (CR) roster
Players
Coaches

Pos.	No.	Nat.	Name	Ht.	Age
SG	3	(Argentina)	Barrera, Bernardo	1.95 m (6 ft 5 in)	27 – 4 October 1997
G	4	(Argentina)	Rivero, Juan Manuel	1.91 m (6 ft 3 in)	40 – 2 February 1985
SF	6	(Argentina)	Ferraría, Franco	1.91 m (6 ft 3 in)	22–23 – Missing required parameter 1=month! 2002
C	9	(Cuba)	Bombino, Pedro	2.07 m (6 ft 9 in)	24–25 – Missing required parameter 1=month! 2000
PG	10	(Argentina)	Buendia, Carlos	1.77 m (5 ft 10 in)	30 – 13 March 1995
PG	11	(Argentina)	Treise, Jonatan	1.90 m (6 ft 3 in)	40 – 1 February 1985
SF	17	(Argentina)	Vega, Sebastián	2.00 m (6 ft 7 in)	36 – 9 July 1988
SF	22	(Argentina)	Giorgetti, Franco	2.00 m (6 ft 7 in)	32 – 2 December 1992
PG	33	(Argentina)	Luchino, Gaston	1.80 m (5 ft 11 in)	43 – 6 February 1982
C	35	(Argentina)	Acuña, Roberto	2.08 m (6 ft 10 in)	27 – 14 September 1997
C	77	(Argentina)	Romero, Diego	2.00 m (6 ft 7 in)	42 – 7 September 1982
C	79	(Argentina)	Fogel, Leandro	2.00 m (6 ft 7 in)	25 – 14 May 2000
SF	88	(United States)	Shaw, Matthew	2.03 m (6 ft 8 in)	37 – 23 February 1988

Head coach

- (Argentina) Gonzalo García

Assistant coach(es)

- (Argentina) Martín Villagran

Legend

- (C) Team captain
- Injured

- Roster
Updated: 2020-3-19

=== Retired numbers ===
Gimnasia y Esgrima retired numbers
N°	Nat.	Player	Pos.	Tenure	N° Ret.	Ref.
7	(Argentina)	Pablo Moldú	SG	1994–2006	2019	
8	(Argentina)	Gabriel Cocha	SG	1991–92, 1994–98, 2003–07	2019	

== Honours ==
- Liga Nacional de Básquet (1):

2005–06

== Notable players ==
Note: Flags indicate national team eligibility at FIBA-sanctioned events. Players may hold other non-FIBA nationalities not displayed.

Criteria

To appear in this section a player must have either:

- Set a club record or won an individual award while at the club
- Played at least one official international match for their national team at any time
- Played at least one official NBA match at any time.

- (Argentina) Federico Aguerre
- (Argentina) Diego Alba
- (United States) Charles Jones
