= Esteban De la Fuente =

Argentine basketball player

Esteban Pablo De la Fuente (born November 18, 1968, in Buenos Aires) is a retired Argentine male professional basketball player. At a height of 1.97 meters (6'5¾") tall, and a weight of 105 kg (232 lbs.), he played at the shooting guard and small forward positions. His number 7 jersey was retired by Quilmes (MdP), in 2013.

== Professional career ==
De la Fuente was a two time Argentine League Finals MVP, in 1994 and 1995.

== National team career ==
De la Fuente represented the senior men's Argentine national basketball team at the 1996 Summer Olympic Games, in Atlanta, Georgia, where his team finished in ninth place in the overall-rankings. A year earlier he helped claim Argentina's first ever gold medal in senior men's Panamerican basketball, at the 1995 Pan American Games, after defeating the United States in the final, in Mar del Plata, Argentina.
