= Estadio Socios Fundadores =

Indoor arena in Argentina

Coordinates: 45°52′S 67°29′W

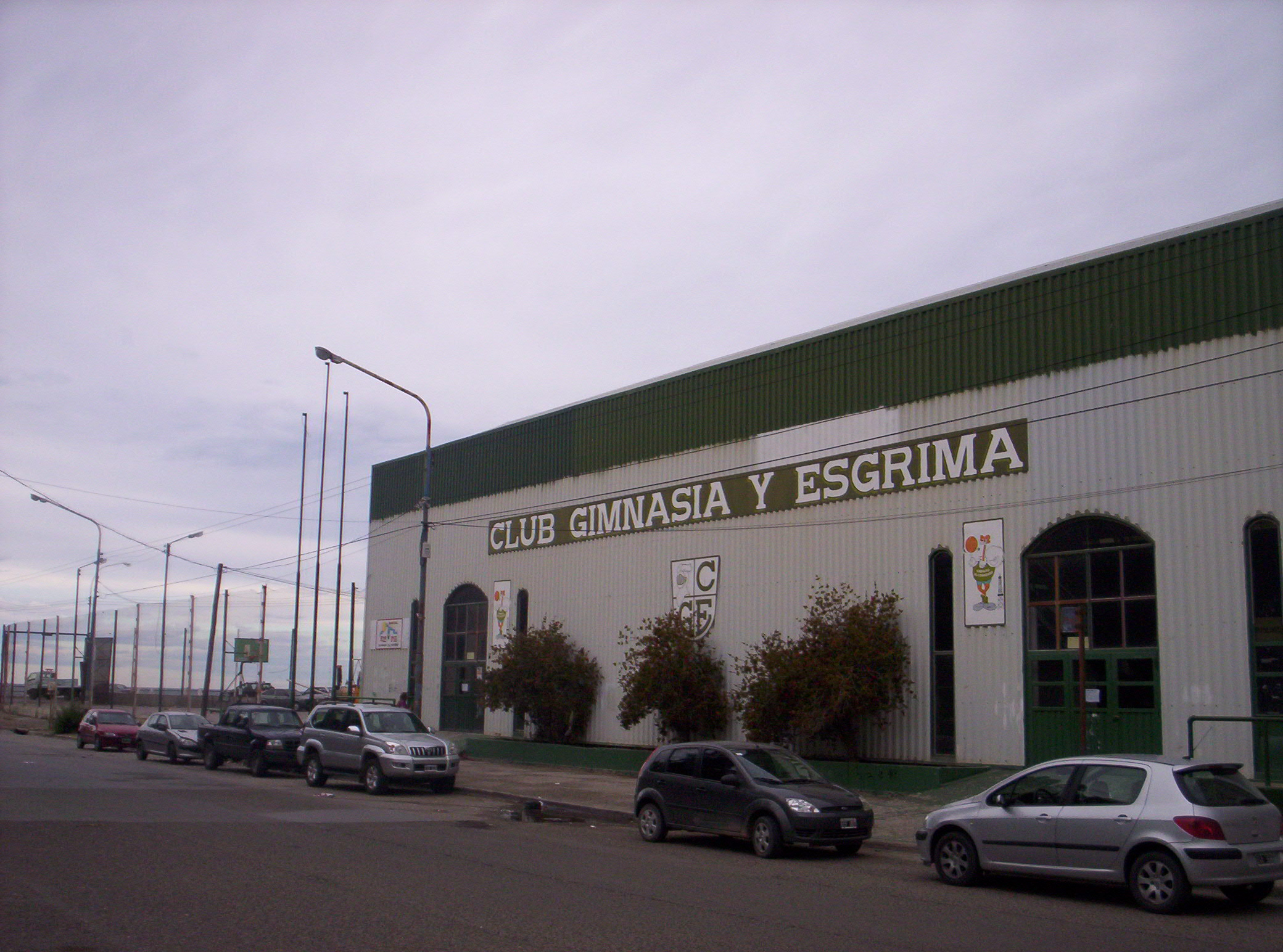
- Interactive map of Estadio Socios Fundadores
- Location: Comodoro Rivadavia, Argentina
- Capacity: 1,900

Construction
- Opened: 1985

Tenant
- Gimnasia y Esgrima de Comodoro Rivadavia

The Estadio Socios Fundadores is an indoor arena in Comodoro Rivadavia, Argentina which was opened in 1985. It is primarily used for basketball and is the home arena of Gimnasia y Esgrima de Comodoro Rivadavia. It holds 1,900 people.

In 2015 it hosted the South American qualification for the FIVB Volleyball Women's World Cup.
