= Quilmes de Mar del Plata =

Quilmes (Mar del Plata)
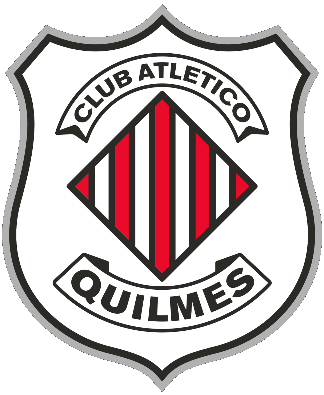
- Nickname: Cervecero, Tricolor, Quilmeño
- Leagues: LNB
- Founded: 12 April 1922; 104 years ago
- Arena: Estadio Once Unidos (capacity: 2,300)
- Location: Mar del Plata, Argentina
- Team colors
- President: Pablo Zabala
- Head coach: Javier Bianchelli
- Website: clubquilmes.org
Home	Away

Club Atlético Quilmes (mostly known as Quilmes de Mar del Plata) is a sports club based in Mar del Plata, Buenos Aires Province, Argentina. Although other sports are practised in the club, Quilmes is mostly known for its basketball team, which currently plays in the Liga Nacional de Básquet, the top division of Argentine league system.

Other activities practised in Quilmes are dance, field hockey, football, gymnastics, martial arts and roller skating. Quilmes' arch-rival is Peñarol, from the same city.

== History ==
=== Origins in football ===
Quilmes was founded on April 12, 1922, by a group of young people who used to play football in some of the many unoccupied lands that existed in Mar del Plata in those times. They want to participate in competitions organised by "Asociación Marplatense de Foot-Ball" so they founded a club with the purpose of registering to the Association.

Born as a football club, Quilmes adopted the colors worn by River Plate in the 1920s

At the beginning those boys did not have a physical place for their meetings and because of that the Club Ferroviario (founded and integrated by employees of the Buenos Aires Great Southern Railway ("Ferrocarril Sud" in Spanish) allowed them to use their buildings. The raising club also was helped by people from the neighbourhood, who made their contributions. Furthermore, the most important donation was given by the legal representatives of beer company Quilmes in Mar del Plata, José Deyaccobi, who donated the club a set of uniform jerseys, which were equal to River Plate kit. That was the origin of the name and colours of the club.

Quilmes' first President was Eugenio Moure, who also composed the official anthem of the club along with the musicians Luis Duhalde and Francisco Mafia.

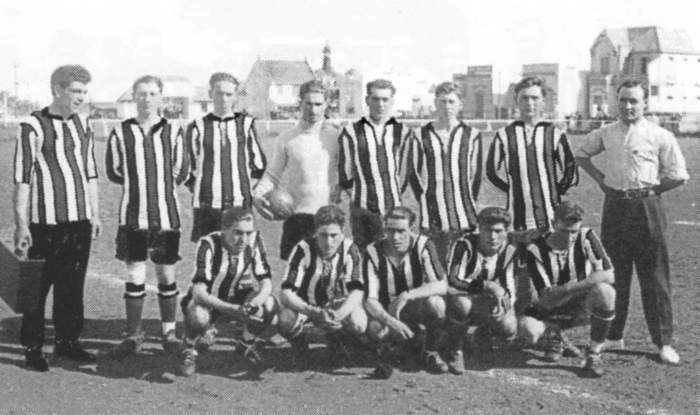
A Quilmes squad of 1925, posing in Plaza España venue

Like most of Argentine clubs, football was the first sport practised in Quilmes, which is considered a pioneer in the city. Moreover, Quilmes' stadium was the frequent host of all the matches played in Mar del Plata. At the beginning, Quilmes' headquarters were located on 25 de Mayo streets. A basketball court would be added later. The basketball section was added in the 1930s, winning its first title in 1947.

The first football venue was built where Moreno Park is located nowadays. In that venue Quilmes played a friendly match v. Santos FC with Pelé as an outstanding host of the city, in the 1960s. The football squad also took part in the 1970 Copa Argentina, being eliminated by Argentinos Juniors (1–4 on aggregate).

In 1983, Quilmes played the "Torneo Regional", after qualifying in a group with Alvarado, Peñarol and C.D. Nicanor Otamendi, but the team was eliminated in first round. The last Quilmes' participation was in the 1996–97 Torneo Argentino B. After qualifying for the second stage, Quilmes was finally eliminated by Sporting (Punta Alta) and Empleados de Comercio (Bolívar).

=== Basketball ===
In 1944, Quilmes affiliated to "Asociación Marplatense de Básquetbol", entering to the second division. The club won the championship that same season, therefore promoting to the first level, "Primera División". In 1947 Quilmes won its first title at the top level of "Marplatense" basketball. The team has won that championship a total of 23 times to date.

In 1987 Quilmes participated in their first national competition, the LNB "C" (third division), where the squad defeated Regatas (San Nicolás) crowning champion and promoting to "Liga Nacional B". After several years playing in that division, Quilmes won the 1990–91 title, promoting to the LNB "A" after defeating Pico Fútbol Club by 101–91. Coached by Oscar Sánchez, the players that took part of the team were Sebastián Ginóbili, Eduardo Dominé, Leandro Ginóbili, Alejandro Alegretti, Fabián Crivaro, Adolfo Perazzo, Michael Wilson, Mario Romay, Javier Bianchini, Juan Pablo Vignolo, Santiago Cuñado and Adrián Martínez.

Quilmes debuted in the LNB in September 1991 v. arch-rival Peñarol, winning the game by 72–69.

== Players ==
=== Current roster ===
Quilmes de Mar del Plata roster
Players
Coaches

Pos.	No.	Nat.	Name	Ht.	Wt.	Age
SF		(Argentina)	Lencina, Ariel	1.88 m (6 ft 2 in)		28 – 5 December 1997
PF	11	(Argentina)	Morales, Sebastian	2.02 m (6 ft 8 in)		38 – 26 January 1988
SF	13	(Argentina)	Maciel, Maximiliano	1.90 m (6 ft 3 in)		42 – 21 September 1983
PG	22	(Argentina)	Tantos, Luciano	1.85 m (6 ft 1 in)		38 – 16 March 1988
PG	23	(United States)	Frazier, Winsome	1.93 m (6 ft 4 in)		44 – 2 August 1982
PG		(Argentina)	Errecalde, Santiago	1.81 m (5 ft 11 in)		32 – 30 May 1994
PG		(Argentina)	González Cheppi, Juan	1.75 m (5 ft 9 in)		29 – 12 August 1997
PF		(Argentina)	Merchant, Jefrey	1.98 m (6 ft 6 in)		28 – 9 September 1997
C	56	(Argentina)	Reimundo, Tomás	2.01 m (6 ft 7 in)		27 – 4 December 1998

Head coach

- (Argentina) Leandro Ramella

Assistant coach(es)

- (Argentina) Maríano Rodríguez

Legend

- (C) Team captain
- Injured

- Roster
Updated: 2019-05-01

=== Retired numbers ===
Quilmes retired numbers
N°	Nat.	Player	Pos.	Tenure	No. ret.	Ref.
4	(Argentina)	Eduardo Dominé	SG	1990, 1991–2001	2009	
7	(Argentina)	Esteban De la Fuente	SG	1991–93, 1995–97, 2004–05	2013	
8	(Argentina)	Guillermo García Oyaga	n/i	1970s–80s	2013	

== Statistics ==
Note: Statistics are correct as of the end of the 2013–14 season.

Season	Division	Position	W	L	Win%	Playoffs
1991–92	1 (LNB)	5th	21	21	.500	Lost Quarterfinals to Olimpo de Bahía Blanca 1–3
1992–93	1 (LNB)	10th	26	25	.510	Won Relegation Play-offs vs. Banco de Córdoba 3–0
1993–94	1 (LNB)	8th	25	27	.481	Lost Quarterfinals vs. Olimpia de Venado Tuerto 0–3
1994–95	1 (LNB)	13th	25	31	.446	Lost Re-Classification Play-offs vs. Peñarol de Mar del Plata 1–3
1995–96	1 (LNB)	6th	26	27	.490	Lost Quarterfinals
1996–97	1 (LNB)	10th	27	27	.500	Lost Re-Classification Play-offs
1997–98	1 (LNB)	16th	15	39	.277	Lost Relegation Play-offs to Belgrano de San Nicolás
1998–99	2 (TNA)	1st	–	–	–	Won Promotion Play-offs vs. Central Entrerriano 3–2
1999–00	1 (LNB)	8th	25	26	.490	Lost Quarterfinals to Estudiantes de Olavarría 1–3
2000–01	1 (LNB)	4th	22	36	.379	Lost Semifinals to Libertad de Sunchales 1–3
2001–02	1 (LNB)	3rd	34	20	.629	Lost Semifinals to Estudiantes de Olavarría 2–3
2002–03	1 (LNB)	8th	20	24	.454	Lost Quarterfinals to Boca Juniors 1–3
2003–04	1 (LNB)	6th	30	22	.577	Lost Quarterfinals to Atenas 1–3
2004–05	1 (LNB)	11th	22	27	.449	Lost Re-Classification to Peñarol de Mar del Plata 2–3
2005–06	1 (LNB)	11th	22	26	.458	Lost Re-Classification to Boca Juniors 1–3
2006–07	1 (LNB)	5th	28	20	.583	Lost Quarterfinals to Regatas Corrientes 1–3
2007–08	1 (LNB)	8th	25	27	.481	Lost Quarterfinals to Libertad de Sunchales 1–3
2008–09	1 (LNB)	12th	22	26	.458	Lost Re-Classification Play-offs to Juventud Sionista 1–3
2009–10	1 (LNB)	15th	20	29	.408	Lost Relegation Play-offs to Ciclista Olímpico 1–3
2010–11	2 (TNA)	1st	28	16	.636	Won Promotion Play-offs vs. San Martín de Corrientes 3–1
2011–12	1 (LNB)	15th	12	36	.250	Lost Relegation Play-offs to 9 de Julio 1–3
2012–13	2 (TNA)	2nd	29	15	.659	Won Promotion Play-offs vs. San Martín de Corrientes 3–1
2013–14	1 (LNB)	9th	14	16	.467	Lost Quarterfinals vs. Peñarol de Mar del Plata 1–3

== Titles ==
=== National ===
- Torneo Nacional de Ascenso (3): 1991, 1999, 2011

=== Regional ===
- Liga Marplatense (23): 1947, 1949, 1950, 1951, 1953, 1954, 1955, 1958, 1961, 1964, 1966, 1967, 1968, 1970, 1972, 1973, 1974, 1976, 1985, 1987, 1991, 1995, 1996
