= 2014–15 Liga Nacional de Básquet season =

Liga Nacional de Básquet
- Season: 2014–15
- Dates: 29 September 2014 – 9 May 2015 (regular season); 12 May – 15 July 2015 (playoffs)
- Games played: 471 (Regular season); 34–57 (Playoffs)
- Teams: 20
- TV partner(s): TyC Sports

Regular season
- FIBA Americas League: Quimsa; Gimnasia Indalo
- Liga Sudamericana: Obras Sanitarias; San Martín de Corrientes; Quilmes
- Season MVP: (Argentina) Nicolás Aguirre
- Promoted: San Martín de Corrientes; Ciclista Juninense

Finals
- Champions: Quimsa
- Runners-up: Gimnasia Indalo
- Semifinalists: San Martín de Corrientes; Quilmes
- Finals MVP: (United States) Robert Battle

Statistical leaders
Points	(United States) Walter Baxley	21.2
Rebounds	(United States) Lee Roberts	10.3
Assists	(Argentina) Philip Hopson	5.9

The 2014–15 Liga Nacional de Básquet season was the 31st season of the top professional basketball league in Argentina. The regular season started on 29 September 2014 and the defending champions were Peñarol. Quimsa won their first title, defeating Gimnasia Indalo in the finals.

== Promotions and relegations ==
Torneo Nacional de Ascenso Champions from the previous season San Martín de Corrientes and runners-up Ciclista Juninense were promoted. As in the previous season, there were no relegations in this tournament.

== Clubs ==
Team	City	Arena	Capacity
Argentino de Junín	Junín	El Fortín de las Morochas	1,465
Atenas	Córdoba	Carlos Cerutti	3,730
Bahía Basket	Bahía Blanca	Osvaldo Casanova	3,950
Boca Juniors	Buenos Aires	Luis Conde	2,000
Ciclista Juninense	Junín	Coliseo del Boulevard	1,500
Ciclista Olímpico	La Banda	Luis Conde	2,000
Estudiantes Concordia	Concordia	Gigante Verde	1,610
Gimnasia y Esgrima (Comodoro Rivadavia)	Comodoro Rivadavia	Socios Fundadores	2,276
Instituto (Córdoba)	Córdoba	Angel Sandrin	2,000
Juventud Sionista	Paraná	Estadio Moisés Flesler	2,100
Lanús	Lanús	Antonio Rotili	4,000
Libertad	Sunchales	El Hogar de los Tigres	4,000
Obras Sanitarias	Buenos Aires	Estadio Obras	3,100
Peñarol	Mar del Plata	Islas Malvinas	8,000
Quilmes	Mar del Plata	Once Unidos	3,000
Quimsa	Santiago del Estero	Estadio Ciudad	5,200
Regatas Corrientes	Corrientes	José Jorge Contte	4,000
San Martín de Corrientes	Corrientes	Raúl A. Ortiz	2,500
La Unión	Formosa	Cincuentenario	4,500

== Regular season ==
=== League table ===
==== North Conference ====
Pos	Team	Pld	W	L	PCT	Qualification or relegation
1	Quimsa	52	43	9	.827	Conference quarterfinals
2	Regatas Corrientes	52	37	15	.712	Conference quarterfinals
3	San Martín de Corrientes	52	31	21	.596	Conference quarterfinals
4	Atenas	52	31	21	.596	Conference quarterfinals
5	Estudiantes Concordia	52	23	29	.442	Conference quarterfinals
6	Ciclista Olímpico	52	23	29	.442	Conference quarterfinals
7	La Unión	52	22	30	.423	Conference quarterfinals
8	Libertad	52	19	33	.365	Reclassification playoffs
9	Juventud Sionista	52	19	33	.365	Reclassification playoffs

==== South Conference ====
Pos	Team	Pld	W	L	PCT	Qualification or relegation
1	Obras Sanitarias	52	34	18	.654	Conference quarterfinals
2	Gimnasia Indalo	52	32	20	.615	Conference quarterfinals
3	Peñarol	52	30	22	.577	Conference quarterfinals
4	Argentino de Junín	52	25	27	.481	Conference quarterfinals
5	Quilmes	52	25	27	.481	Conference quarterfinals
6	Bahía Basket	52	24	28	.462	Conference quarterfinals
7	Boca Juniors	52	21	31	.404	Conference quarterfinals
8	Lanús	52	17	35	.327	Reclassification playoffs
9	Ciclista Juninense	52	12	40	.231	Reclassification playoffs

== Playoffs ==
=== Reclassification playoffs ===
Finals
N8	Libertad	1
N9	Juventud Sionista	2

Finals
S8	Lanús	1
S9	Ciclista Juninense	2

=== Championship playoffs ===
Quarterfinals	Semifinals
N1	Quimsa	3
N9	Juventud Sionista	0
N1	Quimsa	3
N4	Atenas	1
N4	Atenas	3
N5	Estudiantes Concordia	1
North Conference
N2	Regatas Corrientes	1
N7	La Unión	3
N3	San Martín de Corrientes	3
N7	La Unión	2
N3	San Martín de Corrientes	3
N6	Ciclista Olímpico	1
S1	Obras Sanitarias	3
S9	Ciclista Juninense	0
S1	Obras Sanitarias	2
S5	Quilmes	3
S4	Argentino de Junín	2
S5	Quilmes	3
South Conference
S2	Gimnasia Indalo	3
S7	Boca Juniors	2
S2	Gimnasia Indalo	3
S3	Peñarol	1
S3	Peñarol	3
S6	Bahía Basket	2

Conference Finals
N1	Quimsa	3
N3	San Martín de Corrientes	1
S5	Quilmes	0
S2	Gimnasia Indalo	3

Championship finals
N1	Quimsa	4
S2	Gimnasia Indalo	2

== Clubs in international competitions ==
Team	Competition	Progress
Peñarol	FIBA Americas League	Fourth place
Regatas Corrientes	FIBA Americas League	Quarterfinals
Argentino de Junín	Liga Sudamericana de Básquetbol	Semifinals
Boca Juniors	Liga Sudamericana de Básquetbol	Third place
Libertad	Liga Sudamericana de Básquetbol	Group stage

== Awards ==
=== Yearly Awards ===
- Most Valuable Player: Nicolás Aguirre, Quimsa
- Best Foreign Player: Robert Battle, Quimsa
- Sixth Man of the Year: Santiago Scala, Gimnasia Indalo / Nicolás Brussino, Regatas Corrientes
- Rookie of the Year: Juan Pablo Vaulet, Bahía Basket
- Coach of the Year: Silvio Santander, Quimsa
- Most Improved Player: Gabriel Deck, Quimsa
- All-Tournament Team:
  - F Jeremiah Wood, San Martín de Corrientes
  - F Sam Clancy Jr., Gimnasia Indalo
  - C Federico Aguerre, Gimnasia Indalo
  - G Nicolás Aguirre, Quimsa
  - G Walter Baxley, Quilmes
