= 2011–12 Liga Nacional de Básquet season =

- League: Liga Nacional de Básquet
- Sport: Basketball
- Duration: 23 September 2011 – 13 March 2012 (regular season); 16 March – 31 May 2012 (playoffs)
- Number of teams: 16
- TV partner(s): TyC Sports
- Season MVP: (Argentina) Juan Pedro Gutiérrez
- Top scorer: (United States) Joe Troy Smith

2012 Liga Nacional de Básquet Playoffs
- Finals champions: Peñarol
- Runners-up: Obras Sanitarias
- Finals MVP: (Argentina) Facundo Campazzo (Peñarol)

Liga Nacional de Básquet seasons
- ← 2010–11 2012–13 →

The 2011–12 Liga Nacional de Básquet season was the 28th season of the top professional basketball league in Argentina. The regular season started on 23 September 2011. Peñarol won their fourth title, defeating Obras Sanitarias in the finals.

== Promotions and relegations ==
Torneo Nacional de Ascenso champions Quilmes and runners-up San Martín de Corrientes were promoted, occupying the berths left by El Nacional and Argentino de Junín. Quilmes and San Martín de Corrientes would be relegated at the end of the season.

== Clubs ==
Team	City	Arena	Capacity
9 de Julio de Río Tercero	Río Tercero	Estadio José Albert	
Atenas	Córdoba	Carlos Cerutti	3,730
Bahía Basket	Bahía Blanca	Osvaldo Casanova	3,950
Boca Juniors	Buenos Aires	Luis Conde	2,000
Ciclista Olímpico	La Banda	Luis Conde	2,000
Gimnasia y Esgrima (Comodoro Rivadavia)	Comodoro Rivadavia	Socios Fundadores	2,276
Juventud Sionista	Paraná	Estadio Moisés Flesler	2,100
Lanús	Lanús	Antonio Rotili	4,000
Libertad	Sunchales	El Hogar de los Tigres	4,000
Obras Sanitarias	Buenos Aires	Estadio Obras	3,100
Peñarol	Mar del Plata	Islas Malvinas	8,000
Quilmes	Mar del Plata	Islas Malvinas	8,000
Quimsa	Santiago del Estero	Estadio Ciudad	5,200
Regatas Corrientes	Corrientes	José Jorge Contte	4,000
San Martín de Corrientes	Corrientes	Estadio Raúl Argentino Ortiz	2,500
La Unión	Formosa	Cincuentenario	4,500

== Regular season ==
=== First stage ===
The first stage took place between 23 September and 13 November 2011. Teams were divided into two zones. The top four teams from each zone competed in the Torneo Súper 8 that took place in November.

==== North Zone ====
Pos	Team	Pld	W	L	Pts	Qualification
1	Regatas Corrientes	14	11	3	25	Qualified to Torneo Súper 8
2	Libertad	14	9	5	23	Qualified to Torneo Súper 8
3	Quimsa	14	9	5	23	Qualified to Torneo Súper 8
4	Juventud Sionista	14	7	7	21	
5	La Unión	14	6	8	20	
6	Ciclista Olímpico	14	5	9	19	
7	Atenas	14	5	9	19	
8	San Martín de Corrientes	14	4	10	18	

==== South Zone ====
Pos	Team	Pld	W	L	Pts	Qualification
1	Obras Sanitarias	14	11	3	25	Qualified to Torneo Súper 8
2	Bahía Basket	14	10	4	24	Qualified to Torneo Súper 8
3	Peñarol	14	9	5	23	Qualified to Torneo Súper 8
4	Lanús	14	7	7	21	Qualified to Torneo Súper 8
5	Boca Juniors	14	7	7	21	Invited to Torneo Súper 8
6	Gimnasia Indalo	14	6	8	20	
7	9 de Julio de Río Tercero	14	4	10	18	
8	Quilmes	14	2	12	16	

=== Torneo Súper 8 ===
The eighth edition of Torneo Súper 8 took place on 23–26 November 2011 in the city of Mar del Plata, Buenos Aires. Home team Peñarol won their third title, defeating Libertad in the Final.

Quarterfinals
Libertad	72
Quimsa	66
Regatas Corrientes	85
Boca Juniors	74
Obras Sanitarias	80
Lanús	77
Peñarol	75
Bahía Basket	74

Semifinals
Libertad	85
Regatas Corrientes	68
Obras Sanitarias	81
Peñarol	83

Final
Libertad	75
Peñarol	78

=== Second stage ===
The second stage started on 17 November 2011. All 16 teams were ranked together. Each team carried over half of the points obtained in the first stage.

Pos	Team	Pld	W	L	Pts	Qualification or relegation
1	Obras Sanitarias	30	20	10	62.5	Quarterfinals
2	Peñarol	30	21	9	62.5	Quarterfinals
3	Libertad	30	20	10	61.5	Quarterfinals
4	Lanús	30	19	11	59.5	Quarterfinals
5	Quimsa	30	17	13	58.5	Reclassification playoffs
6	Juventud Sionista	30	17	13	57.5	Reclassification playoffs
7	Regatas Corrientes	30	15	15	57.5	Reclassification playoffs
8	Gimnasia Indalo	30	16	14	56	Reclassification playoffs
9	La Unión	30	16	14	56	Reclassification playoffs
10	Atenas	30	16	14	55.5	Reclassification playoffs
11	Bahía Basket	30	13	17	55	Reclassification playoffs
12	Boca Juniors	30	11	19	51.5	Reclassification playoffs
13	Ciclista Olímpico	30	11	19	50.5	Relegation playoffs
14	9 de Julio de Río Tercero	30	11	19	50	Relegation playoffs
15	Quilmes	30	9	21	47	Relegation playoffs
16	San Martín de Corrientes	30	8	22	47	Relegation playoffs

== Playoffs ==
=== Championship playoffs ===
The Playoffs started on 16 March 2012 and ended on 31 May 2012. Peñarol defeated Obras Sanitarias in the Finals.

Reclassification
5	Quimsa	1
12	Boca Juniors	3
7	Regatas Corrientes	3
10	Atenas	0
6	Juventud Sionista	0
11	Bahía Basket	3
8	Gimnasia Indalo	3
9	La Unión	2

Quarterfinals
1	Obras Sanitarias	3
12	Boca Juniors	1
4	Lanús	2
5	Regatas Corrientes	3
2	Peñarol	3
8	Bahía Basket	2
3	Libertad	3
6	Gimnasia Indalo	1

Semifinals
1	Obras Sanitarias	3
7	Regatas Corrientes	0
2	Peñarol	3
3	Libertad	1

Final
1	Obras Sanitarias	2
2	Peñarol	4

=== Relegation playoffs ===
The relegation series began on 16 March. San Martín de Corrientes and Quilmes lost their respective series and were relegated to the Torneo Nacional de Ascenso.

Finals
13	Ciclista Olímpico	3
16	San Martín de Corrientes	2

Finals
14	9 de Julio de Río Tercero	3
15	Quilmes	1

== Clubs in international competitions ==
Team	Competition	Progress
Lanús	FIBA Americas League	Runners-up
Libertad	Liga Sudamericana de Básquetbol	Semifinals
Obras Sanitarias	Liga Sudamericana de Básquetbol	Semifinals
Peñarol	Liga Sudamericana de Básquetbol	Final four
Regatas Corrientes	Liga Sudamericana de Básquetbol	Champions

== Awards ==
=== Yearly Awards ===
- Most Valuable Player: Juan Pedro Gutiérrez, Obras Sanitarias
- Best Foreign Player: Robert Battle, Lanús
- Sixth Man of the Year: Tyler Field, Obras Sanitarias
- Rookie of the Year: Alejandro Konsztadt, Obras Sanitarias
- Coach of the Year: Silvio Santander, Lanús
- Most Improved Player: Facundo Campazzo, Peñarol
- All-Tournament Team:
  - F Tony Washam, Obras Sanitarias
  - F Leonardo Gutiérrez, Peñarol
  - C Juan Pedro Gutiérrez, Obras Sanitarias
  - G Facundo Campazzo, Peñarol
  - G Joe Troy Smith, La Unión
