= 2010–11 Liga Nacional de Básquet season =

- League: Liga Nacional de Básquet
- Sport: Basketball
- Duration: 15 October 2010 – 3 April 2011 (regular season); 6 April – 5 June 2011 (playoffs)
- Teams: 16
- TV partner: TyC Sports
- Season MVP: (Argentina) Juan Pedro Gutiérrez

2011 Liga Nacional de Básquet Playoffs
- Finals champions: Peñarol
- Runners-up: Atenas
- Finals MVP: (Argentina) Leonardo Gutiérrez (Peñarol)

Liga Nacional de Básquet seasons
- ← 2009–10 2011–12 →

The 2010–11 Liga Nacional de Básquet season was the 27th season of the top professional basketball league in Argentina. The regular season started on 15 October 2010. Peñarol won their third title, defeating Atenas in the finals.

== Promotions and relegations ==
Monte Hermoso Básquet and Argentino de Junín, respectively the champions and runners-up of the Torneo Nacional de Ascenso were promoted. Quilmes and Central Entrerriano were relegated.

== Clubs ==
Team	City	Arena	Capacity
9 de Julio de Río Tercero	Río Tercero	Estadio José Albert	
Argentino de Junín	Junín	El Fortín de las Morochas	1,800
Atenas	Córdoba	Carlos Cerutti	3,730
Bahía Basket	Bahía Blanca	Osvaldo Casanova	3,950
Boca Juniors	Buenos Aires	Luis Conde	2,000
Ciclista Olímpico	La Banda	Luis Conde	2,000
Gimnasia y Esgrima (Comodoro Rivadavia)	Comodoro Rivadavia	Socios Fundadores	2,276
Juventud Sionista	Paraná	Estadio Moisés Flesler	2,100
Lanús	Lanús	Antonio Rotili	4,000
Libertad	Sunchales	El Hogar de los Tigres	4,000
Monte Hermoso Básquet	Monte Hermoso	Polideportivo Municipal	2,000
Obras Sanitarias	Buenos Aires	Estadio Obras	3,100
Peñarol	Mar del Plata	Islas Malvinas	8,000
Quimsa	Santiago del Estero	Estadio Ciudad	5,200
Regatas Corrientes	Corrientes	José Jorge Contte	4,000
La Unión	Formosa	Cincuentenario	4,500

== Regular season ==
=== First stage ===
The first stage took place between 15 October and 3 December 2010. Teams were divided into two zones. The top three teams from each zone plus the best fourth team overall and a wildcard competed in the Torneo Súper 8 that took place in December.

==== North Zone ====
Pos	Team	Pld	W	L	Pts	Qualification
1	Regatas Corrientes	14	10	4	24	Qualified to Torneo Súper 8
2	Libertad	14	9	5	23	Qualified to Torneo Súper 8
3	Atenas	14	9	5	23	Qualified to Torneo Súper 8
4	Ciclista Olímpico	14	7	7	21	Qualified to Torneo Súper 8
5	La Unión	14	7	7	21	Qualified to Torneo Súper 8 (Host)
6	Quimsa	14	6	8	20	
7	Juventud Sionista	14	5	9	19	
8	9 de Julio de Río Tercero	14	3	11	17	

==== South Zone ====
Pos	Team	Pld	W	L	Pts	Qualification
1	Peñarol	14	13	1	27	Qualified to Torneo Súper 8
2	Obras Sanitarias	14	12	2	26	Qualified to Torneo Súper 8
3	Lanús	14	8	6	22	Qualified to Torneo Súper 8
4	Bahía Basket	14	7	7	21	
5	Monte Hermoso Básquet	14	6	8	20	
6	Gimnasia y Esgrima (CR)	14	5	9	19	
7	Argentino de Junín	14	4	10	18	
8	Boca Juniors	14	1	13	15	

=== Torneo Súper 8 ===
The seventh edition of Torneo Súper 8 took place on 16–20 December 2010 in the city of Formosa. Atenas won their first title, defeating Peñarol in the Final.

Quarterfinals
Libertad	65
Lanús	60
Atenas	82
Obras Sanitarias	73
Peñarol	80
Ciclista Olímpico	68
La Unión	67
Regatas Corrientes	79

Semifinals
Libertad	60
Atenas	86
Peñarol	81
Regatas Corrientes	67

Final
Atenas	92
Peñarol	85

=== Second stage ===
The second stage started on 6 December 2010. All 16 teams were ranked together. Each team carried over half of the points obtained in the first stage.

Pos	Team	Pld	W	L	Pts	Qualification or relegation
1	Obras Sanitarias	30	21	9	64	Quarterfinals
2	Peñarol	30	20	10	63.5	Quarterfinals
3	Libertad	30	18	12	59.5	Quarterfinals
4	Atenas	30	17	13	58.5	Quarterfinals
5	La Unión	30	18	12	58.5	Reclassification playoffs
6	Lanús (Note: Lanús lost one point following incidents in a home game against Peñarol.)	30	18	12	58	Reclassification playoffs
7	Bahía Basket	30	17	13	57.5	Reclassification playoffs
8	Regatas Corrientes	30	15	15	57	Reclassification playoffs
9	Gimnasia Indalo	30	15	15	54.5	Reclassification playoffs
10	Quimsa	30	13	17	53	Reclassification playoffs
11	9 de Julio de Río Tercero	30	14	16	52.5	Reclassification playoffs
12	Ciclista Olímpico	30	12	18	52.5	Reclassification playoffs
13	Boca Juniors	30	13	17	50.5	Relegation playoffs
14	Monte Hermoso Básquet	30	10	20	50	Relegation playoffs
15	Juventud Sionista	30	10	20	49.5	Relegation playoffs
16	Argentino de Junín	30	9	21	48	Relegation playoffs

== Playoffs ==
=== Championship playoffs ===
The Playoffs started on 6 April 2011 and ended on 5 June 2011. Peñarol defeated Atenas in the Finals.

Reclassification
7	Bahía Basket	2
10	Quimsa	3
5	La Unión	3
12	Ciclista Olímpico	1
8	Regatas Corrientes	3
9	Gimnasia y Esgrima (CR)	1
6	Lanús	3
11	9 de Julio de Río Tercero	0

Quarterfinals
1	Obras Sanitarias	1
10	Quimsa	3
4	Atenas	3
5	La Unión	1
2	Peñarol	3
8	Regatas Corrientes	2
3	Libertad	3
6	Lanús	2

Semifinals
4	Atenas	3
10	Quimsa	0
2	Peñarol	3
3	Libertad	0

Final
4	Atenas	1
2	Peñarol	4

=== Relegation playoffs ===
The relegation series began on 8 April. Monte Hermoso Básquet and Argentino de Junín lost their respective series and were relegated to the Torneo Nacional de Ascenso.

Finals
13	Boca Juniors	3
16	Argentino de Junín	0

Finals
14	Monte Hermoso Básquet	1
15	Juventud Sionista	3

== Clubs in international competitions ==
Team	Competition	Progress
Obras Sanitarias	FIBA Americas League	Final four
Quimsa	FIBA Americas League	Group stage
Regatas Corrientes	FIBA Americas League	Group stage
La Unión	FIBA Americas League	Final four
Atenas	Liga Sudamericana de Básquetbol	Fourth place
Obras Sanitarias	Liga Sudamericana de Básquetbol	Champions

== Awards ==
=== Yearly Awards ===
- Most Valuable Player: Juan Pedro Gutiérrez, Obras Sanitarias
- Best Foreign Player: David Jackson, Libertad
- Sixth Man of the Year: Juan Espil, Bahía Basket
- Rookie of the Year: Miguel Gerlero, Atenas
- Coach of the Year: Julio Lamas, Obras Sanitarias
- Most Improved Player: Alexis Elsener, Obras Sanitarias
- All-Tournament Team:
  - F Alex Galindo, Libertad
  - F Federico Kammerichs, Regatas Corrientes
  - C Juan Pedro Gutiérrez, Obras Sanitarias
  - G Juan Ignacio Sánchez, Bahía Basket
  - G David Jackson, Libertad
