= Nicolás Laprovíttola =

Argentine basketball player (born 1990)

- Laprovíttola with Joventut in 2026

No. 10 – Joventut Badalona
- Position: Point guard / shooting guard
- League: Liga ACB; FIBA Champions League

Personal information
- Born: January 31, 1990 (age 36) Morón, Argentina
- Listed height: 6 ft 3 in (1.91 m)
- Listed weight: 180 lb (82 kg)

Career information
- NBA draft: 2012: undrafted
- Playing career: 2007–present

Career history
- 2007–2013: Lanús
- 2013–2015: Flamengo
- 2015: Lietuvos rytas
- 2015–2016: Estudiantes
- 2016: San Antonio Spurs
- 2017: Baskonia
- 2017–2018: Zenit Saint Petersburg
- 2018: →Joventut Badalona
- 2018–2019: Joventut Badalona
- 2019–2021: Real Madrid
- 2021–2026: FC Barcelona
- 2026–present: Joventut Badalona

Career highlights
- EuroLeague 50–40–90 club (2022); Liga ACB champion (2023); 2× Catalan League champion (2022, 2023); 3× Spanish Supercup winner (2019, 2020, 2026); 2× Spanish Cup winner (2020, 2022); Liga ACB MVP (2019); 2× All-Liga ACB First Team (2019, 2022); All-Liga ACB Second Team (2023); Liga ACB Top Scorer (2019); Liga ACB assists leader (2019); Liga ACB Best Latin American Player (2019); Spanish Supercup MVP (2026); 2× Catalan League MVP (2022, 2023); FIBA Intercontinental Cup champion (2014); FIBA Intercontinental Cup MVP (2014); FIBA Americas League champion (2014); All-FIBA Americas League First Team (2014); 2× FIBA Americas League assists leader (2014, 2015); 2× NBB champion (2014, 2015); NBB Finals MVP (2015); All-NBB Team (2014); 2× Brazilian All-Star (2014, 2015)
- Stats at NBA.com
- Stats at Basketball Reference
Medals
Event	1st	2nd	3rd
FIBA World Cup	0	1	0
FIBA South American Championship	1	1	0
Pan American Games	1	0	0
FIBA AmeriCup	1	2	1
Total	3	4	1
Men's basketball
Representing Argentina
World Cup
Silver medal – second place	2019 China	
FIBA South American Championship
Gold medal – first place	2012 Argentina	
Silver medal – second place	2014 Venezuela	
Pan American Games
Gold medal – first place	2019 Lima	
FIBA AmeriCup
Gold medal – first place	2022 Brazil	
Silver medal – second place	2015 Mexico	
Silver medal – second place	2017 Argentina	
Bronze medal – third place	2013 Venezuela	

Nicolás "Nico" Laprovíttola (born January 31, 1990) is an Argentine professional basketball player for Joventut Badalona of the Spanish Liga ACB and the FIBA Champions League. He is also a member of the Argentina national basketball team.

== Professional career ==
=== Club Atlético Lanús (2007–2013) ===
Laprovíttola's beginnings in basketball first started with Deportivo Morón, and then at Lanús, when he was 17 years old. In 2007, he made his pro debut with Lanús when the team played in the Argentine 2nd Division. They achieved promotion that season to the top Argentine League. Laprovíttola led his team to the Argentine League Final Series in the 2012–13 season against Regatas Corrientes. But the experience of the opposing team, led by Paolo Quinteros, Federico Kammerichs, and Jerome Meyinsse, was crucial during the series, and the team of Corrientes won the national title. Laprovíttola played for six seasons with Club Atlético Lanús.

=== Flamengo (2013–2015) ===
During his preparation for the 2013 FIBA Americas Championship, Laprovíttola spoke about how excited he was that he was going to be playing with Flamengo, to whom he gave several compliments. He was named MVP of the 2014 edition of the FIBA Intercontinental Cup.

=== Lithuania and Spain (2015–2016) ===
On August 2, 2015, Laprovíttola signed a one-year deal with the Lithuanian club Lietuvos rytas. On December 31, 2015, he parted ways with Lietuvos rytas and signed with Spanish club Estudiantes through to the end of the 2016–17 season.

=== San Antonio Spurs (2016) ===
On September 26, 2016, Laprovíttola signed with the San Antonio Spurs. He played his debut NBA game on October 25, 2016, in a 129 - 100 win against the Golden State Warriors. In his debut, Laprovíttola played for three and a half minute and recorded 2 assists while not attempting any field goals.

On November 5, 2016, he scored a season-high 11 points against the Los Angeles Clippers. Laprovíttola was assigned to the Spurs' G-League affiliate team, the Austin Spurs on November 27, 2016. However, he would not play a game for the G - League team as he was immediately recalled to the San Antonio Spurs the next day.

Laprovíttola would play 18 games with the Spurs (with the team winning 15 of those 18 games) before being waived on December 27, 2016. In those 18 games, he averaged 3.3 points and 1.6 assists in 9.7 minutes. As of 2026, Laprovíttola has not played in the NBA since being released by the Spurs.

=== Spain and Russia (2017–2021) ===
On January 18, 2017, Laprovíttola signed with the Spanish club Baskonia for the rest of the season.

On July 7, 2017, Laprovíttola signed a 1+1 deal with Russian club Zenit Saint Petersburg. On January 22, 2018, he was loaned to Club Joventut of the Liga ACB for the rest of the 2017-18 season.

On August 8, 2018, Laprovíttola extended his stay by signing a one-year deal with Joventut. He was named the Liga ACB MVP of the 2018–19 season and was the season's top scorer.

On July 9, 2019, Laprovíttola signed a two-year deal with Real Madrid. On July 1, 2021, Laprovíttola officially parted ways with the Spanish team.

=== FC Barcelona (2021–2026) ===
Laprovíttola would later join Madrid's rivals FC Barcelona as a free agent, signing a 2-season contract in July 2021. The contract would later be extended to 2026. In the 2022–23 season, he would help the Catalans win the 2023 ACB finals. On April 4, 2024, Laprovíttola hit the game-winning 3-pointer as Barcelona defeated Maccabi Tel Aviv 92 – 89 to secure a spot in the 2024 EuroLeague Playoffs.

In October 2024, he was helped off the court by his teammates after hurting his knee during a Liga ACB game against Baskonia. Immediate tests showed a knee ligament sprain. He would have to undergo surgery later that month after having torn his cruciate ligaments, which put an end to his 2024–25 season.

After making his return at the beginning of the 2025–26 season, Laprovíttola suffered another major injury while training in March 2026. He suffered an abductor tendon rupture on his right thigh, which would sideline him for three months.

=== Return to Joventut Badalona (2026–present) ===
On July 15, 2026, Laprovíttola signed a three–year deal with Joventut Badalona of the Liga ACB.

== National team career ==
Laprovíttola played with the junior national team of Argentina at the 2008 FIBA Americas Under-18 Championship in Taiwan, where he won a gold medal and qualified for the 2009 FIBA Under-19 World Championship in New Zealand. Argentina finished in fifth place at the Under-19 World Championship. He also played at the 2011 Pan American Games.

In 2012, Laprovíttola played with the senior men's Argentine national basketball team at the 2012 South American Championship, in Resistencia, where he won the gold medal. After the 2012–13 season, Laprovíttola was selected for the Argentine national team at the FIBA Stanković Cup tournament in China. He was also selected by coach Julio Lamas to represent Argentina at the 2013 FIBA Americas Championship, where he won the bronze medal, the 2014 South American Championship, where he won the silver medal and the 2014 FIBA Basketball World Cup. Laprovíttola also played at the 2015 Pan American Games, at the 2015 FIBA Americas Championship, where he won the silver medal, and at the 2016 Summer Olympics.

In 2019, he participated in the team that won the Pan American gold medal in Lima. He also competed in the 2020 Tokyo Summer Olympics, held during 2021 because of the COVID-19 pandemic, and his highlights included scoring 27 points in Argentina's preliminary round loss to Spain.

In 2022, Laprovittola won the gold medal in the 2022 FIBA AmeriCup held in Recife, Brazil. He was one of Argentina's starting guards in the tournament.

== Career statistics ==
Legend
GP	Games played	GS	Games started	MPG	Minutes per game
FG%	Field-goal percentage	3P%	3-point field-goal percentage	FT%	Free-throw percentage
RPG	Rebounds per game	APG	Assists per game	SPG	Steals per game
BPG	Blocks per game	PPG	Points per game	PIR	Performance index rating
**Bold**	Career high

=== NBA ===
==== Regular season ====
Year	Team	GP	GS	MPG	FG%	3P%	FT%	RPG	APG	SPG	BPG	PPG
2016–17	San Antonio	18	3	9.7	.426	.370	1.000	.6	1.6	.2	.1	3.3
Career		18	3	9.7	.426	.370	1.000	.6	1.6	.2	.1	3.3

=== EuroLeague ===
Year	Team	GP	GS	MPG	FG%	3P%	FT%	RPG	APG	SPG	BPG	PPG	PIR
2016–17	Baskonia	14	0	9.1	.265	.226	.833	.9	2.2	.3	—	2.7	1.2
2019–20	Real Madrid	23	0	13.5	.418	.283	.867	1.4	3.0	.3	—	5.0	5.5
2020–21	Real Madrid	34	13	17.6	.380	.347	.868	1.6	3.8	.7	—	6.8	8.1
2021–22	Barcelona	38	28	20.4	.477	.440	**.882**	1.8	3.1	.7	—	9.6	9.8
2022–23	Barcelona	**39**	**39**	**23.7**	.438	.418	.868	**2.2**	4.6	.7	—	10.4	11.1
2023–24	Barcelona	33	26	22.7	.450	.388	.779	2.0	4.8	.5	—	**12.3**	11.9
2024–25	Barcelona	4	0	22.0	**.583**	**.538**	.625	1.0	**6.2**	**1.0**	—	10.0	**13.2**
Career		185	106	19.2	.511	.390	.844	1.8	3.8	.6	—	8.6	9.0

=== EuroCup ===
Year	Team	GP	GS	MPG	FG%	3P%	FT%	RPG	APG	SPG	BPG	PPG	PIR
2015–16	Lietuvos rytas	**10**	**10**	**27.3**	.404	.269	.760	**4.3**	**5.5**	**1.6**	—	**12.1**	**13.5**
2017–18	Zenit	7	0	17.1	**.450**	**.389**	**.952**	2.1	3.6	1.1	—	9.0	11.4
Career		17	10	23.2	.416	.300	.848	3.4	4.7	1.4	—	10.8	12.6

=== FIBA Americas League ===
Year	Team	GP	GS	MPG	FG%	3P%	FT%	RPG	APG	SPG	BPG	PPG
2012–13	Lanús	**9**	**8**	27.9	.523	.450	.880	1.3	4.2	1.1	**.2**	11.0
2013–14	Flamengo	8	**8**	30.6	.408	.354	.750	3.2	6.2	.6	—	14.4
2014–15	Flamengo	8	7	**30.9**	**.568**	**.522**	**.909**	**3.9**	**7.1**	**1.5**	—	**17.0**
Career		25	23	29.7	.500	.439	.821	2.8	5.8	1.1	.1	14.0

=== Domestic leagues ===
Year	Team	League	GP	MPG	FG%	3P%	FT%	RPG	APG	SPG	BPG	PPG
2008–09	(Argentina) Lanús	LNB-S	14	18.9	.542	.536	.533	1.2	1.3	1.0	.1	6.2
2008–09	(Argentina) Lanús	LNB	30	20.4	.411	.292	.778	1.6	1.6	.9	.1	5.6
2009–10	(Argentina) Lanús	LNB-S	14	18.4	.407	.310	.700	1.2	2.1	1.1	—	6.8
2009–10	(Argentina) Lanús	LNB	30	21.8	.508	.368	.789	1.9	2.1	.9	.0	9.1
2010–11	(Argentina) Lanús	LNB-S	13	25.7	.451	.375	.745	2.9	2.2	1.8	.2	10.4
2010–11	(Argentina) Lanús	LNB	30	21.1	.461	.393	.864	1.9	2.6	1.6	.1	4.5
2011–12	(Argentina) Lanús	LNB-S	13	23.5	.482	.400	.821	2.8	3.1	1.2	.1	9.7
2011–12	(Argentina) Lanús	LNB	30	29.6	.492	.386	.794	3.0	4.0	1.2	.1	10.3
2012–13	(Argentina) Lanús	LNB-S	14	30.8	.511	.425	.854	2.1	3.9	1.6	.1	10.3
2012–13	(Argentina) Lanús	LNB	30	29.5	.469	.410	.788	2.8	3.9	1.3	.1	10.1
2013–14	(Brazil) Flamengo	NBB	36	31.9	.455	.445	.807	3.3	4.9	1.1	—	14.9
2014–15	(Brazil) Flamengo	NBB	39	27.5	.500	.421	.810	3.3	5.7	1.1	—	11.9
2015–16	(Lithuania) Lietuvos rytas	LKL	17	23.1	.468	.444	.912	2.2	3.8	1.2	.1	10.3
2015–16	(Spain) Estudiantes	ACB	20	29.0	.400	.375	.794	2.8	4.4	1.5	—	13.8
2016–17	(Spain) Baskonia	ACB	22	14.9	.402	.397	.783	1.4	3.1	.6	—	6.2
2017–18	(Russia) Zenit	VTBUL	9	15.3	.317	.200	1.000	1.3	2.8	.4	—	4.2
2017–18	(Spain) Joventut Badalona	ACB	17	31.4	.437	.313	.797	2.8	6.9	1.7	—	16.4
2018–19	(Spain) Joventut Badalona	ACB	36	30.5	.468	.394	.792	2.5	6.4	1.1	.1	17.1
2019–20	(Spain) Real Madrid	ACB	26	15.1	.402	.457	.730	1.9	2.9	.4	—	6.0
2020–21	(Spain) Real Madrid	ACB	32	20.5	.450	.425	.842	2.4	3.9	.5	—	9.5
2021–22	(Spain) Barcelona	ACB	44	20.2	.439	.372	.896	1.7	2.5	.9	.1	9.3
2022–23	(Spain) Barcelona	ACB	42	22.7	.456	.415	.850	2.3	3.8	.6	—	12.4
2023–24	(Spain) Barcelona	ACB	33	20.6	.434	.370	.815	1.7	3.6	.8	—	11.3

== Personal life ==
Laprovíttola is the son of Argentinian politician Margarita Stolbizer.
