= Byron Wilson =

American basketball player (born 1971)

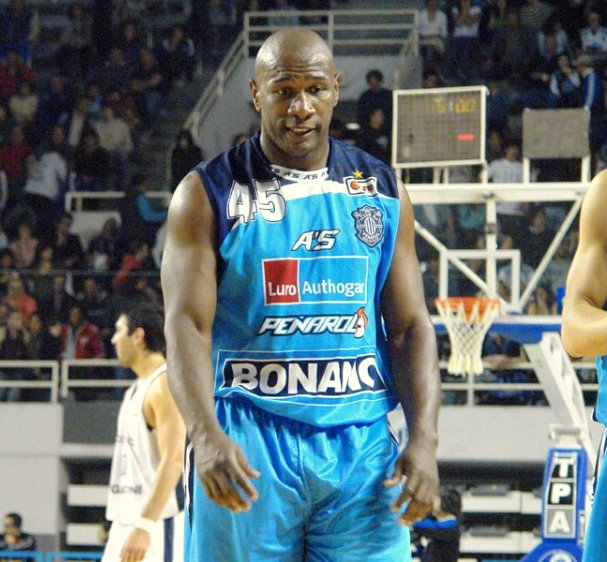
- Wilson playing for Peñarol

Personal information
- Born: September 1, 1971 (age 55) Gary, Indiana, U.S.
- Listed height: 6 ft 3 in (1.91 m)
- Listed weight: 215 lb (98 kg)

Career information
- High school: Lew Wallace (Gary, Indiana)
- College: Utah (1990–1993)
- NBA draft: 1993: 2nd round, 54th overall pick
- Drafted by: Phoenix Suns
- Playing career: 1993–2010
- Position: Guard

Career history
- 1993–1994: Oklahoma City Cavalry
- 1994–1995: Sport Club Cañadense
- 1995–1996: Deportivo Roca
- 1996–1997: Boca Juniors
- 1997–1998: Deportivo Roca
- 1998: Vaqueros de Bayamón
- 1998–1999: Estudiantes de Bahía Blanca
- 1999–2000: Quilmes de Mar del Plata
- 2000–2001: Estudiantes de Olavarría
- 2001–2002: Lucentum Alicante
- 2002–2003: Atenas
- 2003–2005: Boca Juniors
- 2005–2006: Quilmes de Mar del Plata
- 2006–2007: Obras Sanitarias
- 2007: Guaiqueríes de Margarita
- 2007: Peñarol de Mar del Plata
- 2007–2008: Monte Hermoso
- 2008–2009: Ciclista Juninense
- 2009–2010: Asociación Italiana de Charata

Career highlights
- 4× Argentinian League champion (1997, 2001, 2003, 2004); 3× Argentinian League Finals MVP (1997, 2001, 2004); 2× Argentinian Cup champion (2004, 2005); South American Basketball League champion (2001); Campeonato Panamericano de Clubes champion (2000); Argentinian League Best Import (1998); CBA All-Rookie Second Team (1994); First-team All-WAC (1993)
- Stats at Basketball Reference

Byron Neal Wilson (born September 1, 1971) is an American former professional basketball player who also holds Argentinian nationality. A 6-foot-3 guard, he played college basketball at Utah for 3 years, sitting out his freshman year due to Proposition 48. He was selected by the Phoenix Suns in the second round of the 1993 NBA draft (54th overall), but he was cut before the beginning of the 1993–94 NBA season and started his professional career in the CBA. He then moved to Argentina and began a long career there, playing 570 games in the Liga Nacional de Básquet, scoring 11,149 points, and winning 4 national championships, 3 Finals MVP titles, and one Liga Sudamericana title. He retired in 2010 after a 17-year professional career.

== High school career ==
Wilson was born and raised in Gary, Indiana, where he attended Lew Wallace High School: he averaged 19 points, 10.6 rebounds and 3.8 assists per game as a senior in high school, shooting 52% from the field. He also shot 80% from the free throw line in high school. At the end of his last year at Lew Wallace he was an All-City, All-Conference and All-State selection.

== College career ==
Wilson was recruited by Wisconsin and Utah: he committed to Utah and signed on May 30, 1989, being one of the first recruits brought to the program by newly appointed head coach Rick Majerus. However, Wilson was declared academically ineligible by the NCAA, following the recently introduced Proposition 48, and he had to sit out his first year of college basketball. He regained his eligibility in 1990, and after being suspended in the first game of his sophomore year for being late to practice he debuted with the Utes on November 27, 1990, against Seattle Pacific. Coach Majerus gave Wilson a starting spot on the team, and the guard ranked third in scoring behind Josh Grant and Walter Watts with 8.7 points per game over 32 appearances (30 starts).

Wilson's junior season saw him lead the team in steals with 1.3 per game, and he was the second best scorer with 12.1 points per game behind Paul Afeaki: he also recorded a career-high of 25 points on February 19, 1991, against BYU. On January 30, 1992, Wilson scored a half-court buzzer beater against UTEP giving Utah a 57–54 win. On February 9, 1992, he shot 100% (5/5) on three-pointers against San Diego State, a new single-game record for the Utes, and he was named WAC Player of the Week on February 10, 1992. At the end of his junior season he recorded career-highs in all shooting categories, including a 39.6% from the 3-point line.

Wilson played 31 games in his senior season, recording per game career-highs in rebounds (5.7), assists (2.8), steals (1.3) and points (12.5): he ranked third on the team in scoring, second in rebounding and third in assists. He also shot a career-best 47.4% from the field. He was named WAC player of the week on January 18, 1993, and at the end of the year he was a first-team All-WAC selection. Wilson ended his career at Utah with 1,087 points and 449 rebounds.

=== College statistics ===
Year	Team	GP	GS	MPG	FG%	3P%	FT%	RPG	APG	SPG	BPG	PPG
1990–91	Utah	32	30	21.3	.429	.343	.663	3.0	1.5	0.8	0.5	8.7
1991–92	Utah	35	18	24.6	.440	.396	.780	5.1	1.8	1.3	0.3	12.1
1992–93	Utah	31		30.1	.474	.362	.759	5.7	2.8	1.3	0.3	12.5
Career		98		25.3	.449	.370	.745	4.6	2.0	1.1	0.4	11.1

== Professional career ==
After the end of his senior season, Wilson was automatically eligible for the 1993 NBA draft, during which he was selected by the Phoenix Suns with the 27th and last pick in the second round (54th overall). He participated in the Rocky Mountain Revue in Salt Lake City with the Suns, but he was cut before the beginning of the 1993–94 NBA season, being released on October 16, 1993. He then signed for the Oklahoma City Cavalry of the Continental Basketball Association and played 50 games (26 starts) averaging 13.1 points, 2.6 rebounds, 1.8 assists and 1.1 steals in 24.3 minutes per game. Wilson was selected to the CBA All-Rookie Second Team.

In 1994 he signed for Sport Club Cañadense, an Argentine club in Cañada de Gómez, and contributed to save the team from relegation. In 1995 he joined Deportivo Roca and in 1996 he signed for Boca Juniors, where he won the league title, being named the LNB Finals MVP; during the 1996–97 finals he scored a career-high 47 points on May 19, 1997, against Independiente de Pico in 48 minutes of play. In 1997 he moved back to Deportivo Roja and was named LNB Best Foreign Player for the 1997–98 season after averaging 28.3 points over 51 games of regular season play. In 1998 he signed for Vaqueros de Bayamón of Baloncesto Superior Nacional in Puerto Rico, averaging 18.6 points, 3.9 rebounds and 2.2 assists in 11 games.

In 1999 he went back to Argentina and signed for Quilmes de Mar del Plata, where he won the Campeonato Panamericano de Clubes de Básquetbol. In 2000 he joined Estudiantes de Olavarría and he had the most successful season of his career: he won the league title, the Finals MVP award and the 2001 Liga Sudamericana de Básquetbol. He averaged 20.8 points in 49 games of LNB play with Estudiantes and also scored 37 in a finals game against Libertad de Sunchales. In 2001 he had his only experience in Europe: he transferred to Spain, signing with CB Lucentum Alicante: he played 30 regular season games in the LEB, averaging 13.8 points, 3.4 rebounds and 1.5 assists in 30.3 minutes per game, and appeared in 8 playoff games with averages of 9.1 points, 2.8 rebounds and 0.3 assists in 22 minutes of playing time. In 2002 he returned to Argentina and signed for Atenas, where he won the league title for the third time in his career.

In 2003 he went back to Boca Juniors, and played two more season, winning the 2004 LNB championship and being named Finals MVP. In his 3 seasons with Boca Juniors he scored a total of 2,873 points. In 2005–06 he spent another season with Quilmes, while in 2006–07 he was part of the roster of Obras Sanitarias. In 2007 he had a brief experience in Venezuela, playing for Guaiqueríes de Margarita, and then moved to Peñarol, where he averaged 14.9 minutes per game. In 2008 he was the first foreign player to reach 11,000 points in the history of LNB while playing for Monte Hermoso.

He spent the 2008–09 season with Ciclista Juninense and he retired after the 2009–10 season played for Asociación Italiana de Charata in the Torneo Nacional de Ascenso. He scored a total of 11,149 points in 570 games in the Liga Nacional de Básquet.
