= 2009–10 Liga Nacional de Básquet season =

- League: Liga Nacional de Básquet
- Sport: Basketball
- Duration: 7 October 2009 – 28 March 2010 (regular season); 31 March – 25 May 2010 (playoffs)
- Teams: 16
- TV partner: TyC Sports
- Season MVP: (Argentina) Leonardo Gutiérrez

2010 Liga Nacional de Básquet Playoffs
- Finals champions: Peñarol
- Runners-up: Atenas
- Finals MVP: (Argentina) Leonardo Gutiérrez (Peñarol)

Liga Nacional de Básquet seasons
- ← 2008–09 2010–11 →

The 2009–10 Liga Nacional de Básquet season was the 26th season of the top professional basketball league in Argentina. The regular season started on 7 October 2009. Peñarol won their second title, defeating Atenas in the finals.

== Promotions and relegations ==
Torneo Nacional de Ascenso Champions from the previous season La Unión and runners-up Unión de Sunchales were promoted, occupying the berths left by Ben Hur and Monte Hermoso. Central Entrerriano, also from the second-tier tournament, traded places with Independiente de Neuquén, who had to sell their berth due to financial difficulties.

== Clubs ==
Team	City	Arena	Capacity
Atenas	Córdoba	Carlos Cerutti	3,730
Bahía Blanca Estudiantes	Bahía Blanca	Osvaldo Casanova	3,950
Boca Juniors	Buenos Aires	Luis Conde	2,000
Central Entrerriano	Gualeguaychú	Estadio José María Bértora	2,000
Ciclista Olímpico	La Banda	Luis Conde	2,000
Gimnasia y Esgrima (Comodoro Rivadavia)	Comodoro Rivadavia	Socios Fundadores	2,276
Juventud Sionista	Paraná	Estadio Moisés Flesler	2,100
Lanús	Lanús	Antonio Rotili	4,000
Libertad	Sunchales	El Hogar de los Tigres	4,000
Obras Sanitarias	Buenos Aires	Estadio Obras	3,100
Peñarol	Mar del Plata	Islas Malvinas	8,000
Quilmes	Mar del Plata	Estadio Once Unidos	2,000
Quimsa	Santiago del Estero	Estadio Ciudad	5,200
Regatas Corrientes	Corrientes	José Jorge Contte	4,000
La Unión	Formosa	Cincuentenario	4,500
Unión de Sunchales	Sunchales	La Fortaleza del Bicho; Coliseo del Sur	

== Regular season ==
=== First stage ===
The first stage took place between 7 October and 25 November 2009. Teams were divided into two zones. The top three teams from each zone plus the best fourth team overall and a wildcard competed in the Torneo Súper 8 that took place in December.

==== North Zone ====
Pos	Team	Pld	W	L	Pts	Qualification
1	Atenas	14	9	5	23	Qualified to Torneo Súper 8
2	Quimsa	14	9	5	23	Qualified to Torneo Súper 8
3	Juventud Sionista	14	9	5	23	Qualified to Torneo Súper 8
4	Libertad	14	7	7	21 (Note: Libertad wins head-to-head against La Unión 2–0.)	Qualified to Torneo Súper 8
5	La Unión	14	7	7	21	
6	Unión de Sunchales	14	6	8	20	
7	Regatas Corrientes	14	6	8	20	
8	Ciclista Olímpico	14	1	13	15	

==== South Zone ====
Pos	Team	Pld	W	L	Pts	Qualification
1	Peñarol	14	10	4	24	Qualified to Torneo Súper 8
2	Boca Juniors	14	9	5	23	Qualified to Torneo Súper 8
3	Obras Sanitarias	14	8	6	22	Qualified to Torneo Súper 8
4	Central Entrerriano	14	7	7	21	
5	Quilmes	14	7	7	21	Qualified to Torneo Súper 8 (wildcard)
6	Lanús	14	5	9	19	
7	Gimnasia y Esgrima (CR)	14	5	9	19	
8	Bahía Blanca Estudiantes	14	5	9	19	

=== Torneo Súper 8 ===
The sixth edition of Torneo Súper 8 took place on 17–20 December 2009 in the city of Mar del Plata. Peñarol won their second title, defeating Atenas in the Final.

Quarterfinals
Juventud Sionista	94
Quimsa	77
Peñarol	93
Quilmes	87
Atenas	80
Obras Sanitarias	66
Boca Juniors	87
Libertad	73

Semifinals
Juventud Sionista	65
Peñarol	78
Atenas	75
Boca Juniors	71

Final
Peñarol	74
Atenas	67

=== Second stage ===
The second stage started on 27 November 2010. All 16 teams were ranked together. Each team carried over half of the points obtained in the first stage.

Pos	Team	Pld	W	L	Pts	Qualification or relegation
1	Peñarol	30	23	7	65	Quarterfinals
2	Atenas	30	22	8	63.5	Quarterfinals
3	Juventud Sionista	30	17	13	58.5	Quarterfinals
4	Libertad	30	17	13	57.5	Quarterfinals
5	Boca Juniors	30	16	14	57.5	Reclassification playoffs
6	Quimsa	30	15	15	56.5	Reclassification playoffs
7	La Unión	30	16	14	56.5	Reclassification playoffs
8	Unión de Sunchales	30	17	13	56	Reclassification playoffs
9	Regatas Corrientes	30	16	14	55	Reclassification playoffs
10	Lanús	30	14	16	53.5	Reclassification playoffs
11	Bahía Blanca Estudiantes	30	13	17	52.5	Reclassification playoffs
12	Obras Sanitarias	30	11	19	52	Reclassification playoffs
13	Gimnasia y Esgrima (CR)	30	12	18	51.5	Relegation playoffs
14	Quilmes	30	11	19	51.5	Relegation playoffs
15	Ciclista Olímpico	30	14	16	51	Relegation playoffs
16	Central Entrerriano	29	6	23	45.5	Relegation playoffs

== Playoffs ==
=== Championship playoffs ===
The Playoffs started on 31 March 2011 and ended on 25 May 2011. Peñarol defeated Atenas in the Finals.

Reclassification
7	La Unión	2
10	Lanús	3
5	Boca Juniors	3
12	Obras Sanitarias	0
8	Unión de Sunchales	1
9	Regatas Corrientes	3
6	Quimsa	3
11	Bahía Blanca Estudiantes	1

Quarterfinals
1	Peñarol	3
10	Lanús	0
4	Libertad	1
5	Boca Juniors	3
2	Atenas	3
9	Regatas Corrientes	2
3	Juventud Sionista	3
6	Quimsa	1

Semifinals
1	Peñarol	3
10	Boca Juniors	0
2	Atenas	3
3	Juventud Sionista	2

Final
1	Peñarol	4
2	Atenas	1

=== Relegation playoffs ===
The relegation series began on 2 April. Central Entrerriano and Quilmes lost their respective series and were relegated to the Torneo Nacional de Ascenso.

Finals
13	Gimnasia y Esgrima (CR)	3
16	Central Entrerriano	0

Finals
14	Quilmes	2
15	Ciclista Olímpico	3

== Clubs in international competitions ==
Team	Competition	Progress
Atenas	FIBA Americas League	Group stage
Obras Sanitarias	FIBA Americas League	Group stage
Peñarol	FIBA Americas League	Champions
Quimsa	FIBA Americas League	Final four
Libertad	Liga Sudamericana de Básquetbol	Final four
Juventud Sionista	Liga Sudamericana de Básquetbol	Final four
Quimsa	Liga Sudamericana de Básquetbol	Champions

== Awards ==
=== Yearly Awards ===
- Most Valuable Player: Leonardo Gutiérrez, Peñarol
- All-Tournament Team:
  - F Leonardo Gutiérrez, Peñarol
  - F Juan Locatelli, Atenas
  - C Román González, Quimsa
  - G Juan Pablo Figueroa, Atenas
  - G David Jackson, Libertad
