= Peter Ezugwu =

English basketball player (born 1976)

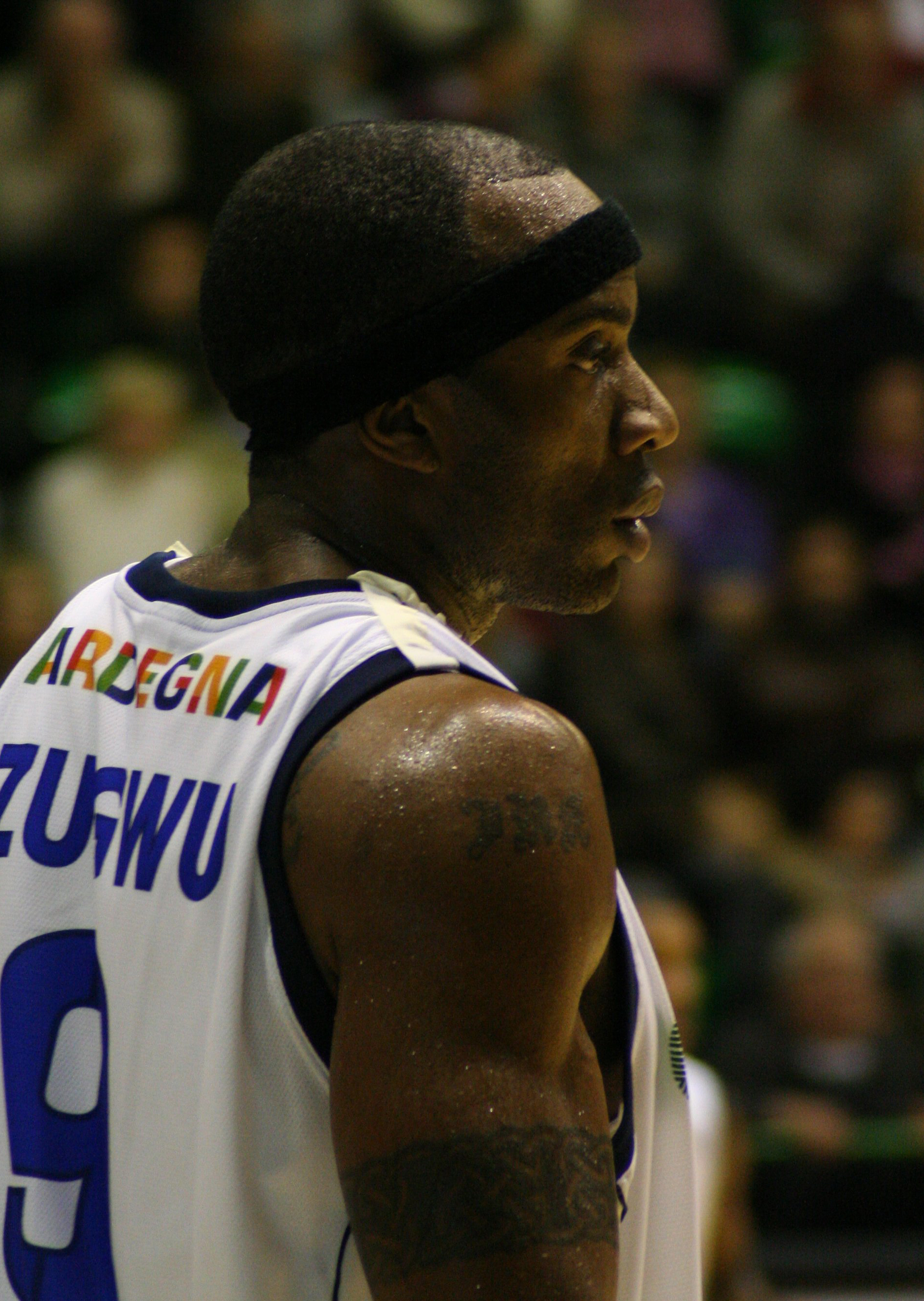
- Peter Ezugwu

Personal information
- Born: 10 September 1976 (age 50) Shrewsbury, England
- Listed height: 2.02 m (6 ft 8 in)
- Listed weight: 222 lb (101 kg)

Career information
- College: Eastern Michigan (1994–1998)
- Playing career: 1998–2012
- Position: Center
- Number: 9

Career history
- 1999–2000: Aurora Jesi
- 2000–2001: Melilla
- 2001: Joventut Badalona
- 2001–2002: Breogán
- 2002: Robur Osimo
- 2002–2003: Scafati
- 2003–2004: Inca
- 2004–2005: S.S. Felice Scandone
- 2005: Zaragoza
- 2005–2007: Pavia
- 2007–2008: Andrea Costa Imola
- 2008: Široki
- 2008–2009: Dinamo Sassari
- 2009–2010: Andrea Costa Imola
- 2010: 9 de Julio de Río Tercero
- 2010: Boca Juniors
- 2011: Unione Cestistica Casalpusterlengo
- 2012: La Banda Olympic Cyclist

Nkechinyelu Peter Ezugwu // is an English business person and former professional basketball player.

== Playing career ==
In 2000, he played in the Italian squad of Aurora Jesi of the Serie A2 where he came off the bench. After two years in Spain where he played for Melilla, Joventut Badalona and Breogán, in 2002 he returned to the Seria A2 where he joined Robur Osimo, but ended the season with Scafati. Then again he went to Spain where he played for Inca in the LEB.

In the 2004–05 Lega Basket Serie A season, Ezugwu made his debut in Italy's top division when he was a permanent member of Air Avellino's starting lineup. From here, after a brief interlude at Zaragoza, he played another three seasons in Italy's Serie A2, two with Pavia and one with Andrea Costa Imola. In April 2008 he has a brief stunt with experience with Široki of Bosnia and Herzegovina, then he returned to the Serie A2 at Dinamo Sassari, with which he reaches the final of the play-offs with a personal contribution of 9.9 points and 6.9 rebounds. The following year he returned to Andrea Costa Imola, playing again in the Serie A2.

In January 2011, after a brief engagement in the 2009–10 Liga Nacional season with 9 de Julio de Río Tercero and Boca Juniors, he returned once again to the Serie A2 where he played for Unione Cestistica Casalpusterlengo. In the summer of 2012 he played with La Banda Olympic Cyclist.
