= 2001 Liga Sudamericana de Básquetbol =

Liga Sudamericana de Básquetbol
- Season: 2001
- Dates: 12 February – 13 April 2001
- Teams: 16

Finals
- Champions: (Argentina) Estudiantes de Olavarría
- Runners-up: (Argentina) Gimnasia y Esgrima (CR)
- Semifinalists: (Argentina) Atenas (Brazil) Flamengo

The 2001 Liga Sudamericana de Básquetbol, or 2001 FIBA South American League, was the sixth edition of the top-tier tournament for basketball teams from South America. The tournament began on 12 February 2001 and finished on 13 April 2001. Argentine team Estudiantes de Olavarría won their first title, defeating Gimnasia y Esgrima de Comodoro Rivadavia in the finals. This tournament saw the only appearance of a team from outside South America, the NBDL Ambassadors from the United States, coached by Nate Archibald. The team played their only home game in the stadium of Unión de Santa Fe in the quarterfinals, where they lost the series 1–2 against Brazilian team Flamengo.

== Format ==
Teams were split into four groups of four teams each, and played each other in a round-robin format. The top two teams from each group advanced to the final stage, a best-of-three direct playoff elimination in the quarterfinals and the semifinals, and a best-of-five elimination series in the Grand Finals, where the champion was decided.

== Teams ==
Country	Team
Argentina	Atenas
Argentina	Estudiantes de Olavarría
Argentina	Gimnasia y Esgrima de Comodoro Rivadavia
Bolivia	Real Santa Cruz
Brazil	Flamengo
Brazil	Uberlândia
Brazil	Vasco da Gama
Chile	Provincial Osorno
Chile	Universidad de Concepción
Colombia	Piratas de Bogotá
Ecuador	ESPE
Paraguay	San José
Peru	Universidad Alas Peruanas
United States	NBDL Ambassadors
Uruguay	Welcome
Venezuela	Cocodrilos de Caracas

== Group stage ==
=== Group A ===
Pos	Team	Pld	W	L	Pts	Qualification
1	(Argentina) Gimnasia y Esgrima de Comodoro Rivadavia	3	3	0	6	Advances to final stage
2	(Brazil) Vasco da Gama	3	2	1	5	Advances to final stage
3	(Chile) Provincial Osorno	3	1	2	4	
4	(Peru) Universidad Alas Peruanas	3	0	3	3	

Source: FIBA Archive

12 February 2001	Vasco da Gama (Brazil)	87–88	(Argentina) Gimnasia y Esgrima de Comodoro Rivadavia	Osorno, Chile

12 February 2001	Provincial Osorno (Chile)	92–77	(Peru) Universidad Alas Peruanas	Osorno, Chile

13 February 2001	Vasco da Gama (Brazil)	111–57	(Peru) Universidad Alas Peruanas	Osorno, Chile

13 February 2001	Provincial Osorno (Chile)	86–109	(Argentina) Gimnasia y Esgrima de Comodoro Rivadavia	Osorno, Chile

13 February 2001	Provincial Osorno (Chile)	71–88	(Brazil) Vasco da Gama	Osorno, Chile

13 February 2001	Gimnasia y Esgrima de Comodoro Rivadavia (Argentina)	95–78	(Peru) Universidad Alas Peruanas	Osorno, Chile

=== Group B ===
Pos	Team	Pld	W	L	Pts	Qualification
1	(Argentina) Estudiantes de Olavarría	3	3	0	6	Advances to final stage
2	(Brazil) Uberlândia	3	2	1	5	Advances to final stage
3	(Colombia) Piratas de Bogotá	3	1	2	4	
4	(Bolivia) Real Santa Cruz	3	0	3	3	

Source: FIBA Archive

14 February 2001	Estudiantes de Olavarría (Argentina)	86–82	(Brazil) Uberlândia	Bogotá, Colombia

14 February 2001	Piratas de Bogotá (Colombia)	83–73	(Bolivia) Real Santa Cruz	Bogotá, Colombia

15 February 2001	Estudiantes de Olavarría (Argentina)	136–68	(Bolivia) Real Santa Cruz	Bogotá, Colombia

15 February 2001	Piratas de Bogotá (Colombia)	65–83	(Brazil) Uberlândia	Bogotá, Colombia

16 February 2001	Estudiantes de Olavarría (Argentina)	90–86	(Colombia) Piratas de Bogotá	Bogotá, Colombia

16 February 2001	Uberlândia (Brazil)	98–74	(Bolivia) Real Santa Cruz	Bogotá, Colombia

=== Group C ===
Pos	Team	Pld	W	L	Pts	Qualification
1	(Argentina) Atenas	3	3	0	6	Advances to final stage
2	(United States) NBDL Ambassadors	3	2	1	5	Advances to final stage
3	(Paraguay) San José	3	1	2	4	
4	(Chile) Universidad de Concepción	3	0	3	3	

Source: FIBA Archive

15 February 2001	Atenas (Argentina)	90–75	(Chile) Universidad de Concepción	Mar del Plata, Argentina
				Arena: Polideportivo Islas Malvinas

15 February 2001	NBDL Ambassadors (United States)	87–76	(Paraguay) San José	Mar del Plata, Argentina
				Arena: Polideportivo Islas Malvinas

16 February 2001	Atenas (Argentina)	93–74	(Paraguay) San José	Mar del Plata, Argentina
				Arena: Polideportivo Islas Malvinas

16 February 2001	NBDL Ambassadors (United States)	94–84	(Chile) Universidad de Concepción	Mar del Plata, Argentina
				Arena: Polideportivo Islas Malvinas

17 February 2001	Atenas (Argentina)	103–93	(United States) NBDL Ambassadors	Mar del Plata, Argentina
				Arena: Polideportivo Islas Malvinas

17 February 2001	San José (Paraguay)	97–80	(Chile) Universidad de Concepción	Mar del Plata, Argentina
				Arena: Polideportivo Islas Malvinas

=== Group D ===
Pos	Team	Pld	W	L	Pts	Qualification
1	(Brazil) Flamengo	3	2	1	5	Advances to final stage
2	(Uruguay) Welcome	3	3	0	6	Advances to final stage
3	(Colombia) Cocodrilos de Caracas	3	1	2	4	
4	(Ecuador) ESPE	3	0	3	3	

Source: FIBA Archive

17 February 2001	Cocodrilos de Caracas (Colombia)	83–72	(Uruguay) Welcome	Rio de Janeiro, Brazil

17 February 2001	Flamengo (Brazil)	118–66	(Ecuador) ESPE	Rio de Janeiro, Brazil

18 February 2001	Cocodrilos de Caracas (Colombia)	96–56	(Ecuador) ESPE	Rio de Janeiro, Brazil

18 February 2001	Flamengo (Brazil)	91–96	(Uruguay) Welcome	Rio de Janeiro, Brazil

19 February 2001	Cocodrilos de Caracas (Colombia)	82–116	(Brazil) Flamengo	Rio de Janeiro, Brazil

19 February 2001	Welcome (Uruguay)	107–63	(Ecuador) ESPE	Rio de Janeiro, Brazil

== Final stage ==
Quarterfinals
(Argentina) Estudiantes de Olavarría	2
(Brazil) Vasco da Gama	0
(Argentina) Atenas	2
(Uruguay) Welcome	1
(Argentina) Gimnasia y Esgrima (CR)	2
(Brazil) Uberlândia	1
(Brazil) Flamengo	2
(United States) NBDL Ambassadors	1

Semifinals
(Argentina) Estudiantes de Olavarría	2
(Argentina) Atenas	1
(Argentina) Gimnasia y Esgrima (CR)	2
(Brazil) Flamengo	1

Grand Finals
(Argentina) Estudiantes de Olavarría	3
(Argentina) Gimnasia y Esgrima (CR)	1

=== Quarterfinals ===
==== Game 1 ====
5 March 2001	Uberlândia (Brazil)	83–89 (Series: 0–1)	(Argentina) Gimnasia y Esgrima (CR)	Uberlândia, Brazil

5 March 2001	NBDL Ambassadors (United States)	114–100 (Series: 1–0)	(Brazil) Flamengo	Santa Fe, Argentina

9 March 2001	Welcome (Uruguay)	88–83 (Series: 1–0)	(Argentina) Atenas	Montevideo, Uruguay

9 March 2001	Vasco da Gama (Brazil)	67–91 (Series: 0–1)	(Argentina) Estudiantes de Olavarría	Rio de Janeiro, Brazil

==== Game 2 ====
12 March 2001	Flamengo (Brazil)	93–90 (Series: 1–1)	(United States) NBDL Ambassadors	Rio de Janeiro, Brazil

12 March 2001	Gimnasia y Esgrima (CR) (Argentina)	90–91 (Series: 1–1)	(Brazil) Uberlândia	Comodoro Rivadavia, Argentina
				Arena: Estadio Socios Fundadores

12 March 2001	Flamengo (Brazil)	93–90 (Series: 1–1)	(United States) NBDL Ambassadors	Rio de Janeiro, Brazil

16 March 2001	Atenas (Argentina)	101–74 (Series: 1–1)	(Uruguay) Welcome	Córdoba, Argentina
				Arena: Polideportivo Municipal Carlos Cerutti

16 March 2001	Estudiantes de Olavarría (Argentina)	107–106 (Series: 2–0)	(Brazil) Vasco da Gama	Olavarría, Argentina
				Arena: Parque Carlos Guerrero

==== Game 3 ====
13 March 2001	Gimnasia y Esgrima (CR) (Argentina)	120–68 (Series: 2–1)	(Brazil) Uberlândia	Comodoro Rivadavia, Argentina
				Arena: Estadio Socios Fundadores

13 March 2001	Flamengo (Brazil)	95–92 (Series: 2–1)	(United States) NBDL Ambassadors	Rio de Janeiro, Brazil

18 March 2001	Atenas (Argentina)	91–86 (Series: 2–1)	(Uruguay) Welcome	Córdoba, Argentina
				Arena: Polideportivo Municipal Carlos Cerutti

=== Semifinals ===
==== Game 1 ====
24 March 2001	Atenas (Argentina)	92–81 (Series: 1–0)	(Argentina) Estudiantes de Olavarría	Córdoba, Argentina
				Arena: Polideportivo Municipal Carlos Cerutti

24 March 2001	Flamengo (Brazil)	112–105 (Series: 1–0)	(Argentina) Gimnasia y Esgrima (CR)	Rio de Janeiro, Brazil

==== Game 2 ====
30 March 2001	Estudiantes de Olavarría (Argentina)	79–69 (Series: 1–1)	(Argentina) Atenas	Olavarría, Argentina
				Arena: Parque Carlos Guerrero

30 March 2001	Gimnasia y Esgrima (CR) (Argentina)	108–91 (Series: 1–1)	(Brazil) Flamengo	Comodoro Rivadavia, Argentina
				Arena: Estadio Socios Fundadores

==== Game 3 ====
31 March 2001	Estudiantes de Olavarría (Argentina)	84–80 (Series: 2–1)	(Argentina) Atenas	Olavarría, Argentina
				Arena: Parque Carlos Guerrero

31 March 2001	Gimnasia y Esgrima (CR) (Argentina)	108–105 (Series: 2–1)	(Brazil) Flamengo	Comodoro Rivadavia, Argentina
				Arena: Estadio Socios Fundadores

=== Grand Finals ===
6 April 2001	Gimnasia y Esgrima (CR) (Argentina)	93–88 (Series: 1–0)	(Argentina) Estudiantes de Olavarría	Comodoro Rivadavia, Argentina
				Arena: Estadio Socios Fundadores

7 April 2001	Gimnasia y Esgrima (CR) (Argentina)	86–100 (Series: 1–1)	(Argentina) Estudiantes de Olavarría	Comodoro Rivadavia, Argentina
				Arena: Estadio Socios Fundadores

11 April 2001	Estudiantes de Olavarría (Argentina)	106–84 (Series: 2–1)	(Argentina) Gimnasia y Esgrima (CR)	Olavarría, Argentina
				Arena: Parque Carlos Guerrero

12 April 2001	Estudiantes de Olavarría (Argentina)	100–78 (Series: 3–1)	(Argentina) Gimnasia y Esgrima (CR)	Olavarría, Argentina
				Arena: Parque Carlos Guerrero

== Finals rosters ==
Estudiantes de Olavarría: Gustavo Fernández, Daniel Farabello, Byron Wilson, DeWayne McCray, Gabriel Fernández - Victor Baldo, Paolo Quinteros. Coach: Sérgio Hernández

Gimnasia de Comodoro Rivadavia: Leonardo Diebold, Pablo Moldú, David Scott, Leandro Masieri, Stanley Easterling. Coach: Fernando Duró

== Season MVP ==
- (Argentina) Daniel Farabello
