= Nicolás Caprio =

Argentine footballer (born 1989)

Personal information
- Full name: Nicolás Andrés Caprio
- Date of birth: 26 May 1989 (age 37)
- Place of birth: Santa Fe, Argentina
- Height: 1.84 m (6 ft 0 in)
- Position: Goalkeeper

Team information
- Current team: Chaco For Ever

Senior career*
Years	Team	Apps	(Gls)
2007–2011	Unión de Santa Fe	5	(0)
2011–2012	Libertad de Sunchales	3	(0)
2012–2013	Unión de Santa Fe		
2013–2014	San Jorge de Tucumán	30	(0)
2014	Unión Aconquija		
2015–2021	Cipolletti	67	(0)
2016–2017	→ Deportivo Petapa (loan)	16	(0)
2017–2018	→ Ferro Carril Oeste (GP) (loan)	22	(0)
2019–2020	→ Sarmiento (loan)	3	(0)
2021–2023	Monagas S.C.	66	(0)
2023–2024	Central Norte	9	(0)
2024–2025	Olimpo	11	(0)
2025–	Chaco For Ever	9	(0)
- * Club domestic league appearances and goals as of 17:46, 24 April 2026 (UTC)

Nicolás Andrés Caprio (born 26 May 1989) is an Argentine footballer who plays as a goalkeeper for Chaco For Ever.

== Honors ==
Monagas S.C.

- Venezuelan Primera División runner-up: 2022
