= Polideportivo Gimnasia y Esgrima La Plata =

Indoor arena in La Plata, Argentina

Víctor Nethol Sports Centre
- Polideportivo Víctor Nethol
- El Poli

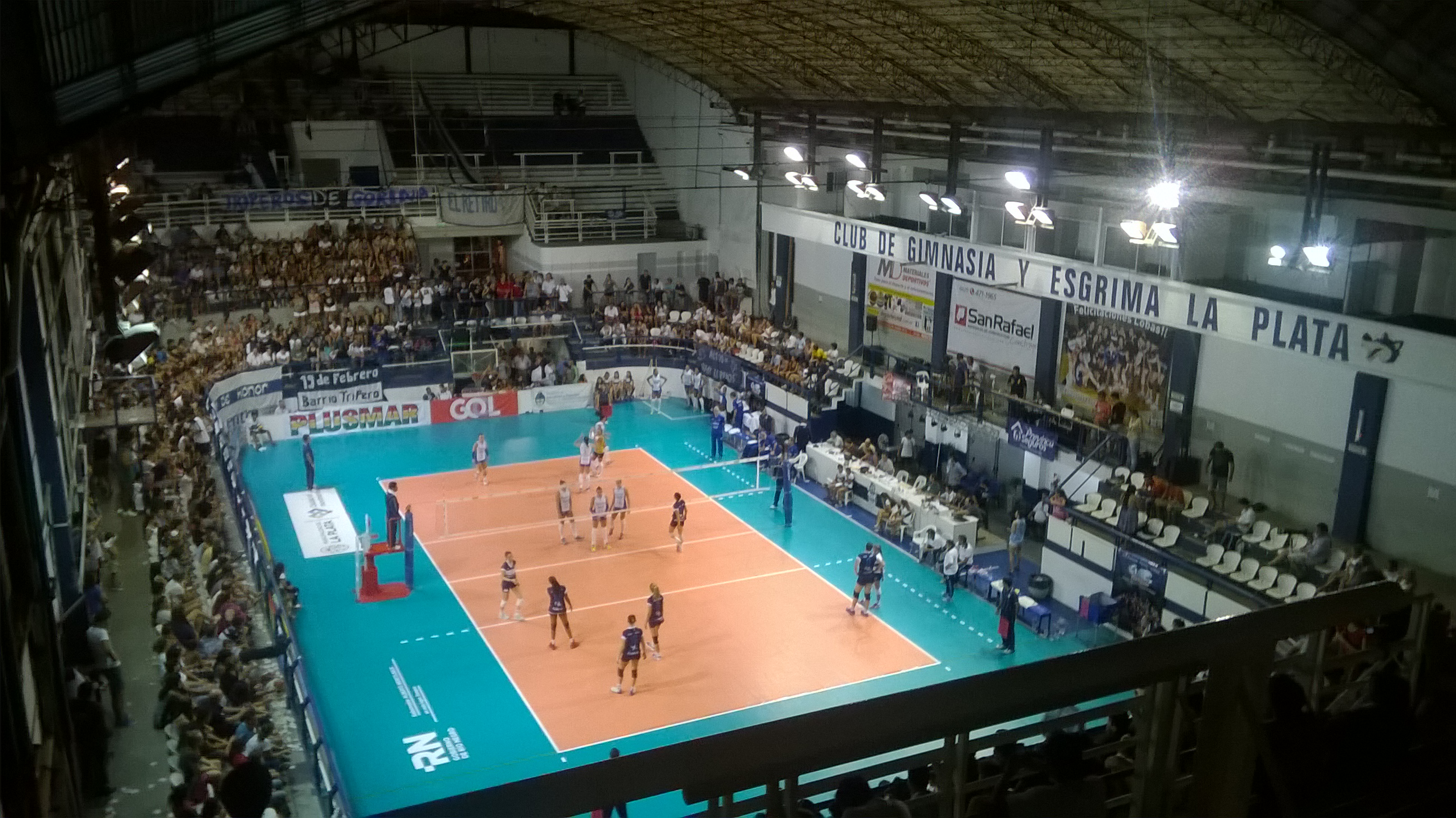
- The arena during a volleyball game in 2016
- Interactive map of Víctor Nethol Sports Centre
- Location: La Plata, Argentina
- Coordinates: 34.9132°S 57.9456°W
- Owner: Gimnasia y Esgrima La Plata
- Capacity: 3,000 (sporting events); 5,000 (other events)
- Type: Sports centre

Construction
- Opened: 1978; 48 years ago
- Renovated: 2009

Tenants
- Gimnasia y Esgrima basketball; Gimnasia y Esgrima volleybal; Gimnasia y Esgrima futsal

The Polideportivo Víctor Nethol is a sports centre located in the city of La Plata in Buenos Aires Province of Argentina. Opened in 1978, it includes gymnasium, roller skating rink, sauna, and a main indoor arena with capacity for 3,000 spectators.

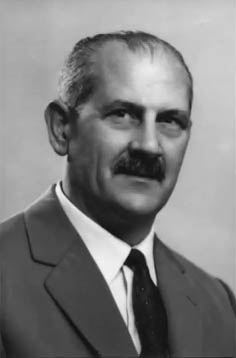
The complex was named after Víctor Nethol, former vice-president of GELP

The complex is owned and operated by Club Gimnasia y Esgrima, and serves as home venue for the club's basketball, futsal, and volleyball teams. The arena is also used for concerts and other cultural events on which its capacity is increased to 5,000.

It was named after doctor in biochemistry Víctor Nethol (1915–1977), who served as teacher at the National University of La Plata and president of the Chemistry Professional Council in the same city.

As a sports enthusiast, he served as vice-president of Gimnasia y Esgrima and president of "Liga Amateur de Football". Nethol died in a car accident in Recoquista, Santa Fe, two days after giving a conference.

== Events hosted ==
- Torneo Nacional de Ascenso: 2001 Finals
- Liga Nacional de Básquet: 2004 Finals, 2016 All-star game
- Women's South American Volleyball Club Championship: 2016
- Supercopa of Liga Femenina de Básquet: 2019

| Preceded by Gimnasio José Liberatti; São Paulo | Women's South American; Volleyball Club Championship; 2016 | Succeeded by Centro Olímpico (Uberaba); Arena Praia (Uberlândia) |
