= Gimnasia y Esgrima (basketball) =

- Leagues: La Liga Argentina
- Founded: 1924; 102 years ago
- Arena: Polideportivo Víctor Nethol
- Capacity: 3,000
- Location: La Plata, Argentina
- Team colors
- Website: gimnasia.org.ar/basquet
Home	Away

The Gimnasia y Esgrima basketball section is part of the Argentine sports club Gimnasia y Esgrima La Plata. The professional senior team currently competes in La Liga Argentina de Básquet (former "Torneo Nacional de Ascenso"), the second division of Argentine basketball league system.

Gimnasia y Esgrima plays its home venues at Polideportivo Víctor Nethol, a multi-purpose stadium with capacity of 3,000.

== History ==
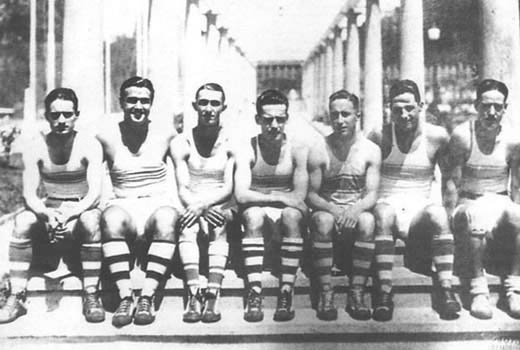
The first team of the club, 1924

Basketball was practiced for the first time at the club in the 1920s. In 1924 the institution built a stadium on the corner of 60 and 118 streets. Since that time, it would become one of the major sports in the club.

In December 1970, Gimnasia y Esgrima went to a tour on Europe. The team participated in the "Torneo de Navidad" (Christmas Tournament) organised by Spanish club Real Madrid. Gimnasia finished 3rd (of 4) after beating Puerto Rico national team 87–82 and lost to Real Madrid (title holder) 83–64 and Joventut Badalona. Coached by Miguel Angel Ripullone, touring players were: Marcelo Arnal, Eduardo "Tato" Bava, Orlando "Chungo" Butta, Ernesto Gehrmann, Santos Melluso, Adolfo "Gurí" Perazzo, Carlos Ratier, Carlos "Gallego" González, Jorge Becerra, Gustavo Chazarreta, Carlos Pellandini. Gimnasia y Esgrima also played Spanish team Santander and Italian side Asti.

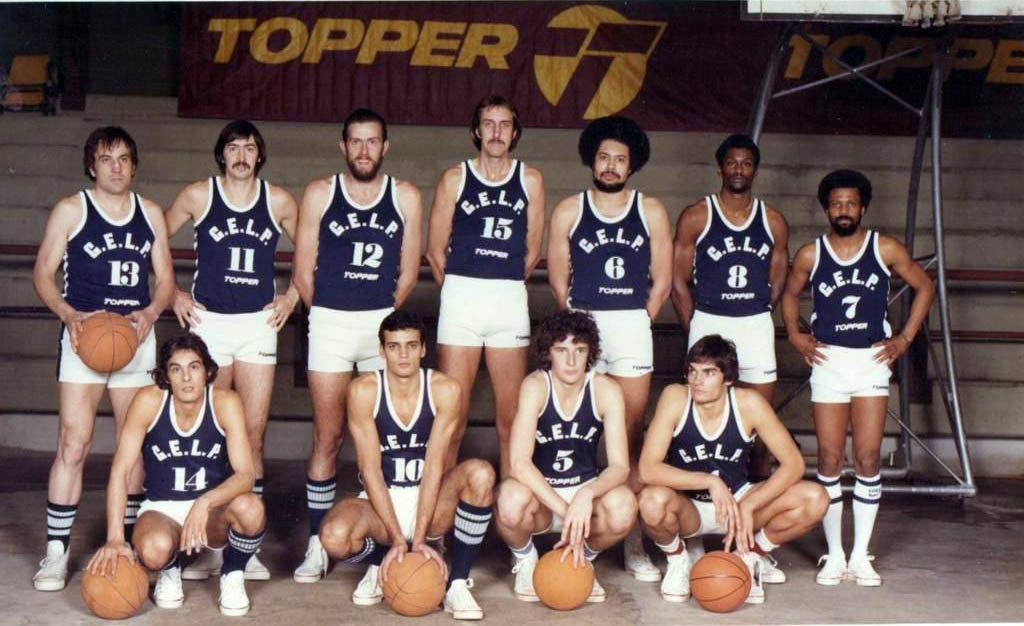
The 1979 team that won the Campeonato Argentino, considered by some journalist as GELP's best team ever

The basketball team peaked during the 1978 and 1979 campaigns, when it won two Metropolitano championships. In both cases, team prevailed over favorite Obras Sanitarias, Argentina's powerhouse at the time. The team included players such as "Gallego" González, "Finito" Gehrmann, Peinado, as well as some Americans: Michael Jackson, Lawrence Jackson Jr., and the team leader and star, point-guard Clarence Edgar Metcalfe, chosen as the league MVP in 1979. The twice-champions were coached by Rolando Sfeir.

After the 1993–94 season, Gimnasia promoted to Torneo Nacional de Ascenso (TNA), the second division. In the following season, the team finished 6th (of 16). At the end of 1996–97, Gimnasia played a relegation series against Atlético Echagüe of Paraná, Entre Ríos, finally winning the series and remaining in the division. In 1999–2000 and being coached by Adrián Gómez, GELP reached the finals v Belgrano (Tucumán), losing 3–2. Belgrano promoted to LNB, the first division. Nevertheless, the following season Gimnasia achieved promotion to Primera after beating Regatas Corrientes 3–1 in the final series. Some notable players were Fabián Horvath, Javier Bulfoni, Walter Storani, Roberto López, Boubacar Aw, and Pop Thorton.

Gimnasia was also runner-up in the 2003–04 Liga Nacional de Básquetbol's Primera División tournament, when it was defeated by Boca Juniors 4–2 in the final series.

In the following season, the team was relegated to the TNA (Second Division) after president Juan José Muñoz decreased substantially the basketball budget, thereby causing the loss of its principal players.

== Notable players ==
Note: Flags indicate national team eligibility at FIBA-sanctioned events. Players may hold other non-FIBA nationalities not displayed.

Criteria

To appear in this section a player must have either:

- Set a club record or won an individual award while at the club
- Played at least one official international match for their national team at any time
- Played at least one official NBA match at any time.

- (Argentina) Carlos A. González #15 (1969–72, 1978–94)
- (Argentina) Ernesto Ghermann #13 (1963–71, 1977–83)
- (Argentina) Alberto Cabrera (1976)
- (Argentina) Raúl Guitart #11
- (Argentina) Jorge Benítez
- (Bolivia) Raul Salvatierra (2015–)
- (United States) Mel Daniels #8 (1979–84)

== Venue ==
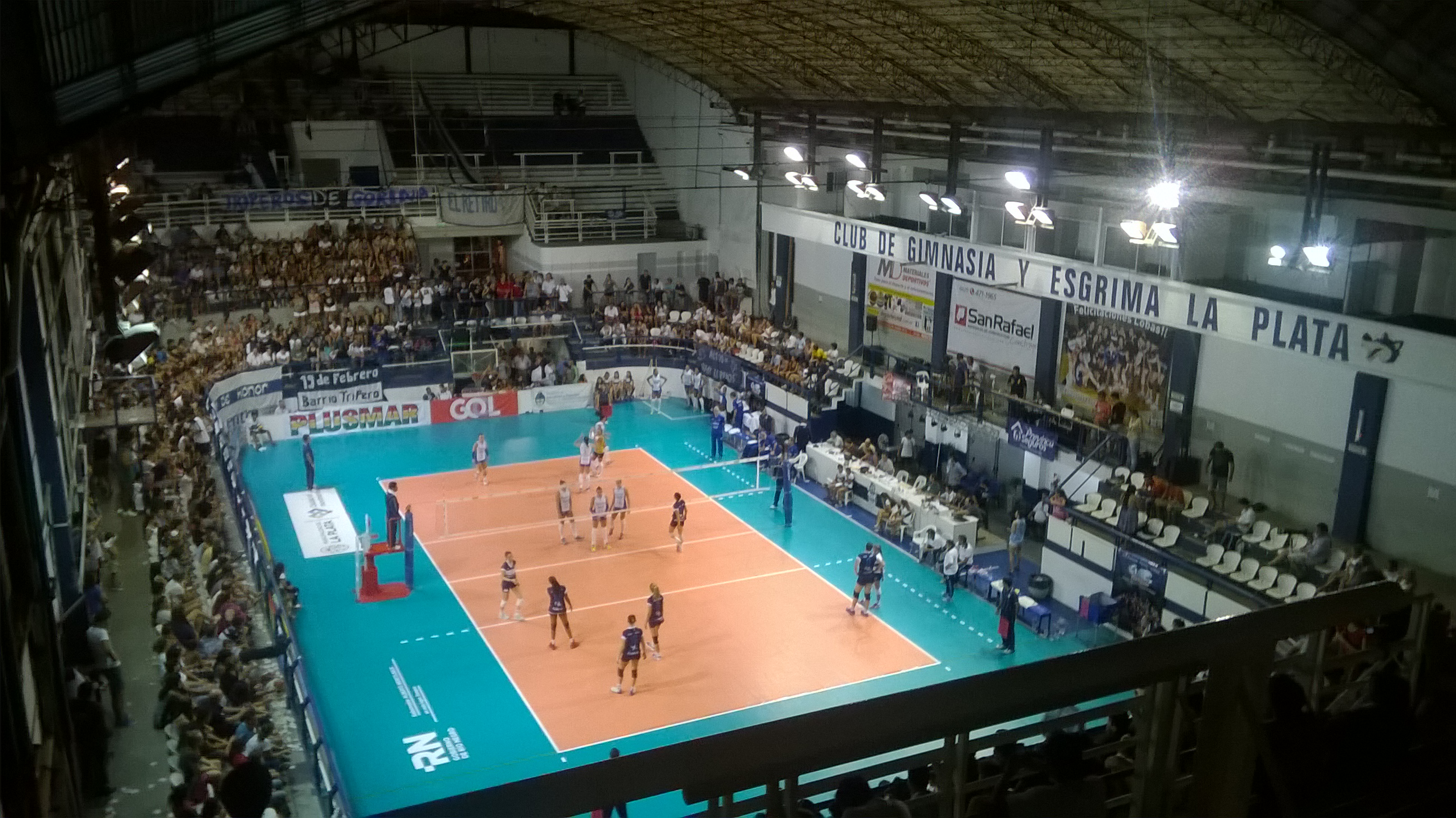
Polideportivo, home venue

Gimnasia y Esgrima plays its home venues at Polideportivo Víctor Nethol, a multi-purpose stadium with capacity of 3,000. It is placed in the club headquarters, on Calle 4.

When the team started in 1924, the squad played at a basketball court located in 60 and 188 streets. It was also rebuilt on the same place. From 1937 to 1978 GyE played its games at the club's headquarters. The "Polideportivo" has held basketball games since 1978.

== Honours ==
- Campeonato Argentino de Clubes (2): 1979, 1980
- Torneo Nacional de Ascenso (1): 2000–01
- Liga de la Asociación Platense de Básquetbol (13): 1958, 1961, 1962, 1963, 1965, 1966, 1967, 1968, 1969, 1970, 1971, 1972, 1973
- Liga de la Federación de Capital Federal (5): 1937, 1978, 1979, 1984, 1985
- Copa "Ismael Genaro Cerisola" (1): 1996
