= Ezequiel Lezcano =

Argentine footballer

Ezequiel Lezcano (born 15 April 1982 in Esperanza (Santa Fe), Argentina) is an Argentine footballer currently playing for 9 de Julio de Morteros of the Torneo Argentino B in Argentina.

== Teams ==
- (Argentina) Unión de Santa Fe 2001–2002
- (Paraguay) Tacuary 2003
- (Argentina) La Perla del Oeste 2004
- (Argentina) Patronato de Paraná 2004–2005
- (Argentina) Libertad de Sunchales 2005–2006
- (Argentina) Unión de Sunchales 2006–2008
- (Argentina) Libertad de Sunchales 2008–2013
- (Argentina) 9 de Julio de Morteros 2013-
