= Central Entrerriano =

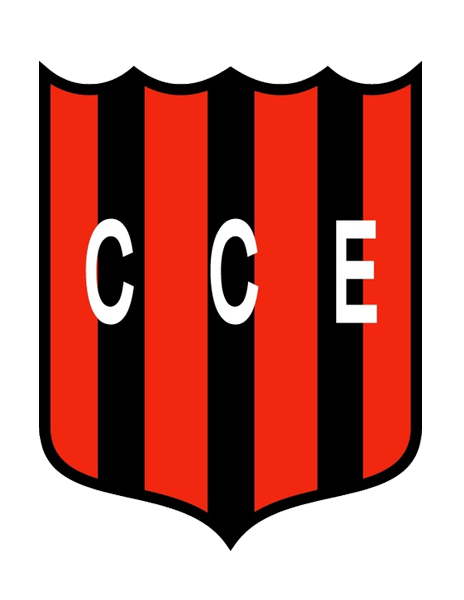
- League: Liga Argentina
- Founded: 15 April 1913; 113 years ago
- Arena: Estadio José María Bértora
- Capacity: 2,000
- Location: Gualeguaychú, Argentina
- Team colors: (black and red)
- President: Francisco Claret
- Vice-president: Carlos Agesta
- Website: cce.com.ar
Main kit	Second kit

Club Central Entrerriano is an Argentine sports club located in Gualeguaychú, a city in Entre Ríos Province. The club is mostly known for its basketball team, which currently plays in La Liga Argentina de Básquet, the second division of the Argentine league system. In past years, Central Entrerriano participated in the top division, Liga Nacional de Básquet. Their home arena is Estadio José María Bértora.

Apart from basketball, the club hosts several sporting activities such as football, field hockey, handball, volleyball, roller hockey, and rugby union.

== History ==
The club was founded on April 15, 1913, by a group of young men who wanted to create a club to practice various sports, but primarily football. One of the first stars of the local league was Alberto Zozaya, who won two titles with the club (1926 and 1928) before moving to Estudiantes de La Plata, where he would make a successful career, becoming a prominent goal scorer.

The club's football team achieved its best campaign in Torneo del Interior (a regional competition) in 1981, coming very close to qualifying for Primera B Nacional, the second division of the Argentine league system, but lost to Chaco For Ever 1–0 in the second leg (the first leg had ended in a 1–1 tie).

Notable footballers that started their career at Central Entrerriano are Víctor Marchesini, Marcelo Broggi, Marcelo Bauzá, Joaquín Irigoytía, Darío Lema, and Diego Herner.

=== Basketball ===
It wasn't until 1992 that Central Entrerriano entered the lower divisions of Argentine basketball, when a group of young enthusiasts accepted an invitation from "Asociación de Clubes" (AdC) to compete in the 1992–93 Primera B [es]). Central Entrerriano debuted in 1992 v El Tala of San Francisco. They spent a couple of seasons in that division before finally achieving promotion to Torneo Nacional de Ascenso, in May 1995.

On Saturday, May 17, 2003, Central Entrerriano promoted to Liga Nacional after defeating Conarpesa. One month later, the team crowned champion of TNA after defeating Argentino de Junín in the 5th game of the finals.

The club debuted in LNB in the 2003–04 season, achieving their best performance in 2005–06 when they finished 6th. Some notable players during those years include Sebastián Vega, Patricio Simoni, Dionisio Gómez Camargo, Alejandro Burgos, and Fernando Funes. In the 2009–10 season, Central Entrerriano was relegated to the second division. Nevertheless, the club refused to participate in TNA due to economic reasons. Central Entrerriano continued playing in Torneo Federal de Básquet [es], where they won the 2018–19 title after defeating Villa Mitre 91–64 (2–1 in the final series). Besides, Adrián Forastieri was named MVP.

Entrerriano returned to TNA in the 2019–20 season, but after the season was interrupted because of the COVID-19 pandemic and changes implemented to TNA (now renamed "La Liga Argentina") the club was unable to afford the expenses associated with a competitive squad, they declined the promotion, returning to Torneo Federal.

== Players ==
=== Current roster ===
Central Entrerriano roster
Players
Coaches

Pos.	No.	Nat.	Name	Ht.	Age
		(Argentina)	Berna, Valentino		21 – 7 October 2004
	6	(Argentina)	Caballero, Tomás		19 – 19 June 2007
			Castillo, Johu		26 – 4 October 1999
			Catalín, Justo		27 – 2 August 1999
			Fux, Simón		17 – 17 March 2009
			Ghersetti, Mario		44 – 16 October 1981
			Siboldi, Juan		19 – 11 December 2006

Head coach

- (Argentina) Carlos Pascal

Legend

- (C) Team captain
- Injured

- Roster
Updated: 17 Aug 2026

== Honours ==
=== Basketball ===
- Torneo Nacional de Ascenso (1): 2002–03
- Torneo Federal de Básquet [es] (2): 2018–19, 2025)
- Primera B [es] (1): 1994-95
- Liga Provincial de Básquet: 1983, 1985, 2014, 2024

=== Football ===
- Liga Departamental de Fútbol de Gualeguaychú (25): 1920, 1921, 1926, 1928, 1930, 1931, 1948, 1950, 1963, 1969, 1970, 1975, 1976, 1978, 1981, 1990 Cl, 1996, 1997, 1998, 2002, 2003, 2007, 2009, 2016 Ap, 2016 Cl
