= Víctor Cejas =

Argentine footballer

Personal information
- Birth name: Víctor Hugo Cejas
- Date of birth: February 23, 1983 (age 43)
- Place of birth: Santa Fe, Argentina
- Height: 1.72 m (5 ft 8 in)
- Position: Midfielder

Senior career*
Years	Team	Apps	(Gls)
2004–2012	Libertad de Sunchales	161	(15)
2010–2011	→ Talleres (loan)	8	(1)
2013	Racing	13	(0)
2013–2014	Deportivo San Jorge	11	(0)
2014	Unión	6	(0)
2021–2022	Libertad de Sunchales	20	(2)
Total		260	(22)
- * Club domestic league appearances and goals

Víctor Hugo Cejas (born February 23, 1983, in Lehmann, Santa Fe, Argentina) is an Argentine footballer currently playing for Libertad de Sunchales of the Torneo Argentino A in Argentina.

== Teams ==
- (Argentina) Libertad de Sunchales 2004–2010
- (Argentina) Talleres de Córdoba 2010–2011
- (Argentina) Libertad de Sunchales 2011–2012
- (Argentina) Deportivo San Jorge 2013–2014
- (Argentina) Unión 2014
- (Argentina) Libertad de Sunchales 2021–2022
