= Walter Cuder =

Argentine footballer

Personal information
- Full name: Walter Cayetano Cuder
- Date of birth: 25 December 1982 (age 43)
- Place of birth: Villaguay, Entre Ríos, Argentina
- Height: 1.70 m (5 ft 7 in)
- Position: Midfielder

Senior career*
Years	Team	Apps	(Gls)
2003–2004	Unión de Santa Fe		
2004–2005	Liverpool (Uruguay)	18	(3)
2005	Paysandú	13	(0)
2006–2007	Unión de Santa Fe		
2007–2008	Central Norte	32	(10)
2008–2009	Crucero del Norte	23	(2)
2009–2010	Libertad (S)		
2010–2011	Crucero del Norte	12	(0)
2011–2013	Libertad (S)		
2013–2014	Unión (S)		
2014	Atlético Bell Ville		
2015–2018	Atlético Gualeguay		
- * Club domestic league appearances and goals

Walter Cayetano Cuder (born 25 December 1982) is an Argentine footballer who played professionally in both Argentina and Uruguay.
