= Parque Carlos Guerrero =

Sports complex in Olavarría, Argentina

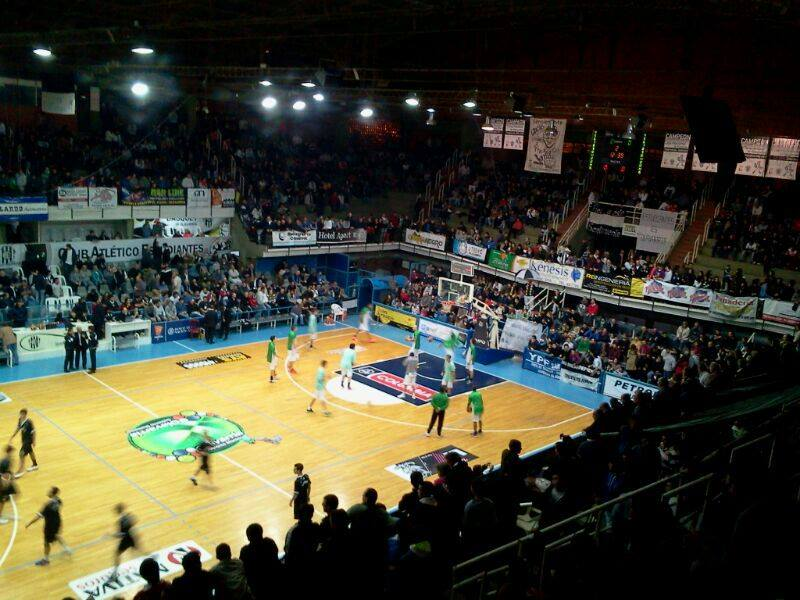
- Basketball match at the Maxi Gimnasio of Parque Carlos Guerrero
- Interactive map of Parque Carlos Guerrero
- Coordinates: 36.896°S 60.333°W
- Capacity: 6,070

Parque Carlos Guerrero is a sports complex in Olavarría, Argentina. Its arena is primarily used for basketball and is home to the Estudiantes de Olavarria. The arena has a capacity of 6,070 people.
