= Estudiantes de Olavarría =

Estudiantes (Olavarría)
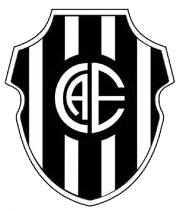
- Full name: Club Atlético Estudiantes
- Founded: April 12, 1912; 113 years ago
- Ground: Parque Carlos Guerrero
- Location: Olavarría, Buenos Aires Province
- Activities: artistic roller skating, association football, basketball, field hockey, golf, rowing, rugby union, softball, tennis, volleyball
- President: Eduardo Pugnaloni
- Colours
- Website: http://caeolavarria.com/

Club Atlético Estudiantes, usually called Estudiantes de Olavarría, is an Argentine sports club based in Olavarría, Buenos Aires Province. Club's nickname is Albinegro.

Estudiantes gained notoriety in late 1990s when the basketball team won two Liga Nacional de Básquet titles, in 1999–00 and 2000–01, coached by Sergio Hernández. The club also won the Liga Sudamericana in 2001. The team currently plays in the Liga Nacional B, the third level of the Argentine league system. Its home arena is Parque Carlos Guerrero.

Apart from basketball, the club hosts a large variety of sports, such as artistic roller skating, association football, field hockey, golf, rowing, rugby union, softball, tennis and volleyball.

== History ==
In 1911, a group of students of one school of Olavarría joined to form a football team, encouraged by their physical education teacher, Alejandro Bertolozzi. The squad, captained by Daniel Márquez, was named "Los Normales" (referring to the name of the school), using a black and white striped jersey.

Those football enthusiasts then decided to establish a club, meeting at one of the team players' house, on April 12, 1912. After a brief discussion, the recently formed club designed its first management commission, with José Rípoli as its first president. "Fútbol Club Estudiantes" was the name chosen for the institution.

When the club played its first official game on August 11, 1912, its name had changed to "Estudiantes Unidos" because of the addition of players from other schools. Estudiantes faced Tiro Federal, winning by 3–1. As years passed by, others sports were added to the club, such as gymnastics, boxing and wrestling (1914), tennis (1915) and bocce (1916).

In basketball, Estudiantes reached its peak in 2000–2001, when the team won two straight Liga Nacional de Básquet titles, after defeating Libertad by 4–1 at the 2001 finals. In 2000, they also won the Copa de Campeones and Panamericano de Clubes. In 2001, Estudiantes won all the tournaments they played in, including the Liga Sudamericana. The club also became one of the few bi-champions of Liga Nacional, along with Atenas de Córdoba and Ferro Carril Oeste.

Center Gabriel Fernández and Paolo Quinteros were some of the most notable players of the team coached by Sergio Hernández, who also choose Byron Wilson to replace J.J. Eubanks, top scorer of the previous season. Wilson would be elected MVP at the end of the final series.

== Honours and titles ==
=== Basketball ===
- Argentine League (2): 1999–00, 2000–01
- FIBA South American League (1): 2001
- Cup of Champions (1): 2001
- Pan American Club Championship (1): 2000
- Top 4 Tournament (1): 2001–02
