= Ciclista Juninense =

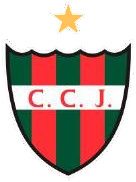
- Nickname: Verdirrojo
- Leagues: Liga Argentina
- Founded: November 6, 1923; 102 years ago
- Arena: Raúl "Chuni" Merlo Stadium (capacity: 2,000)
- Location: Junín, Argentina
- Team colors: (Red and green)
- President: Marcelo Chalé
- Head coach: Mauricio Santángelo
Home	Away

Club Ciclista Juninense is an Argentine sports club based in Junín, Buenos Aires. It was founded in 1923 as a cycling club, but basketball would become the main sport in successive years.

The squad plays in Liga Argentina (formerly "Torneo Nacional de Ascenso", the second division of the Argentine league system). Ciclista's home arena is the Raúl "Chuni" Merlo Stadium.

== History ==
=== Beginning ===
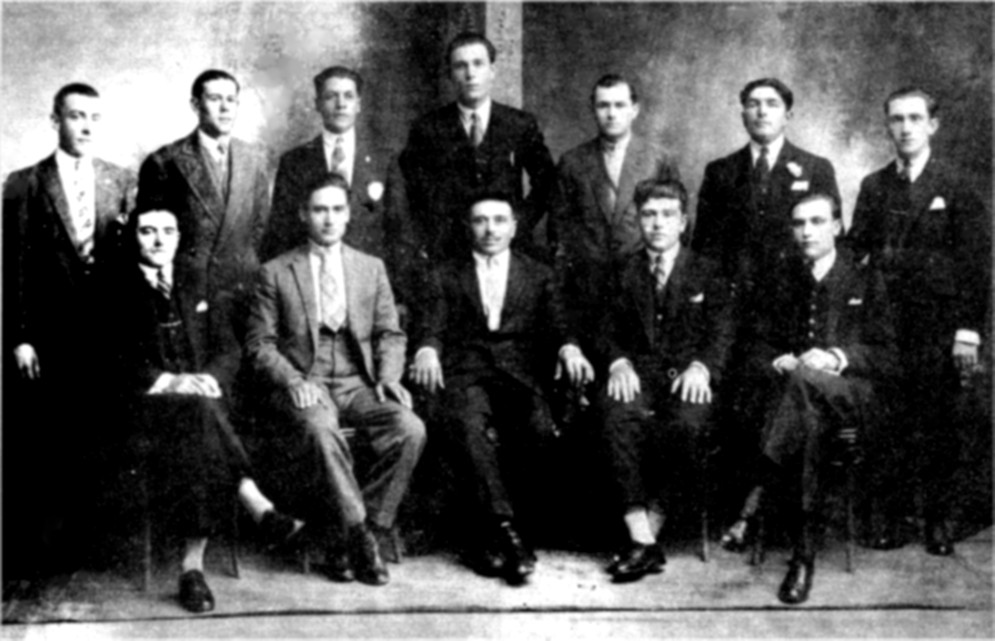
Ciclista's executive committee in 1925

The club was founded on 6 November 1923, by a group of friends with the purpose of encouraging the practise of cycling in the city of Junín. Its first president was Salvador Campo, and the club rented a land to the charity Hospital of the city, to make a circuit there. Once the circuit was finished, the first racing was held on November 11, 1923.

In 1925 the colors green, red, and white were adopted as club's official colors, remaining to date.

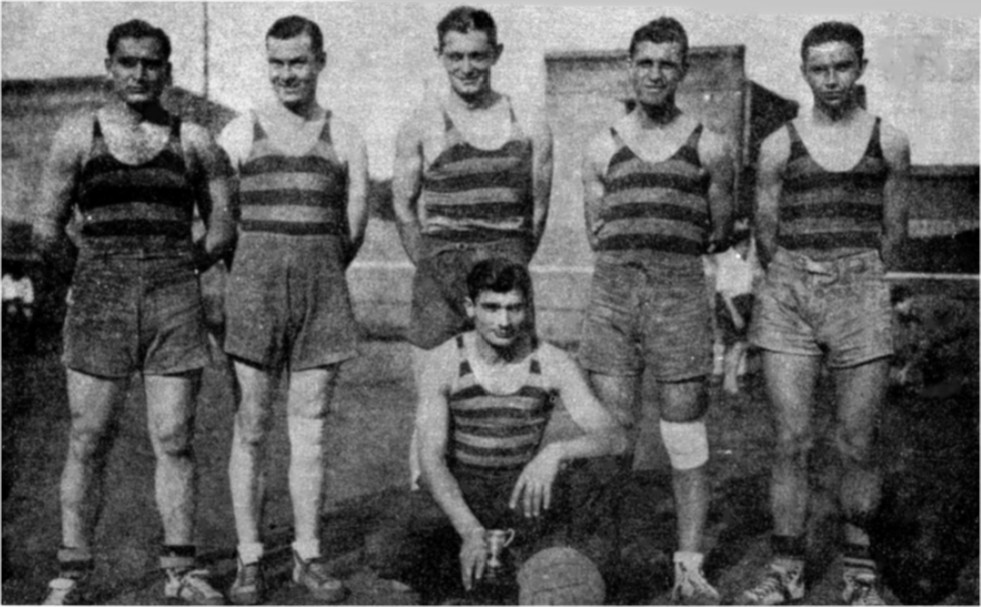
Basketball team of 1935

Basketball began to be practised at the club at the end of the 1920s. In 1929 Ciclista won its first title, defeating team "Los Indios" by 12-11. In 1931 Ciclista inaugurated its basketball arena, erected on Aristóbulo del Valle street.

By those years the Municipality of Junín temporarily gave the club a land in order to build a new cycling circuit there, which was finished and opened on December 6, 1931. In 1942 Ciclista acquired the land where its basketball court had been built years before, which was considered a great achievement for the club and its members.

The basketball squad won two other titles, in 1952 and 1954, defeating San Martín and Los Indios respectively. One year later the club inaugurated a new basketball stadium.

=== National competition ===
In 1994, the club was invited by Asociación de Clubes de Básquet to join the competitions organised by the body. On September 18, 1994, the Verdirrojo made their debut in Torneo Nacional de Ascenso, the second division. The opening game was played away against Obras Sanitarias, a 96–106 loss in extra time. At the end of the season, Ciclista was relegated after losing to Belgrano de San Nicolás 81–92.

In 1995 Ciclista regained their place in TNA, exchanging it for the TV rights, nevertheless the team would be relegated again. After playing two years in Primera B [es], the club could get a new place in TNA when they purchased it from Club SIDERCA of Campana for US$ 96,000.

In 2005, the club achieved promotion to the top division, Liga Nacional, after defeating Juventud Sionista 76–70 at the Coliseo del Boulevard in front of a full attendance (3–2 in the series). The coach was Adrián Capelli. Ciclista made a great campaign in their first season (2005–06) in the first division although they finally lost to Ben Hur in quarter finals.

Ciclista Juninense's tenure on first division came to an end in the 2006–07 season when they were relegated to TNA after a 86–100 loss to Boca Juniors. Nevertheless Ciclista returned to LNB after crowning champions of TNA in the 2013–14 season, after winning the series 3–0 v Cordoban team Instituto. Besides, Luciano Massarelli was named season's MVP. The team was coached was Julián Pagura.

== Venue ==
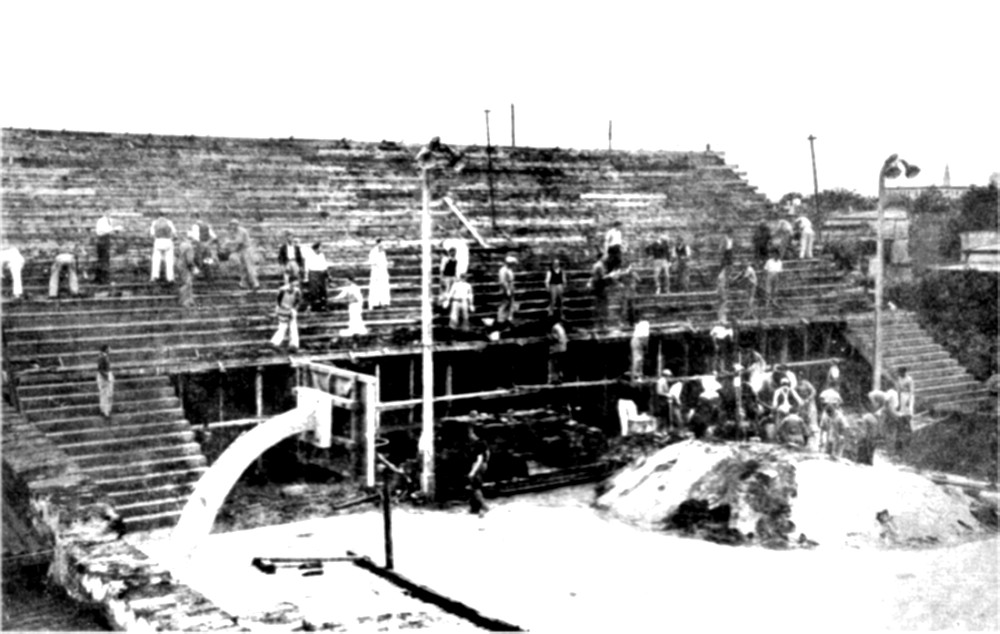
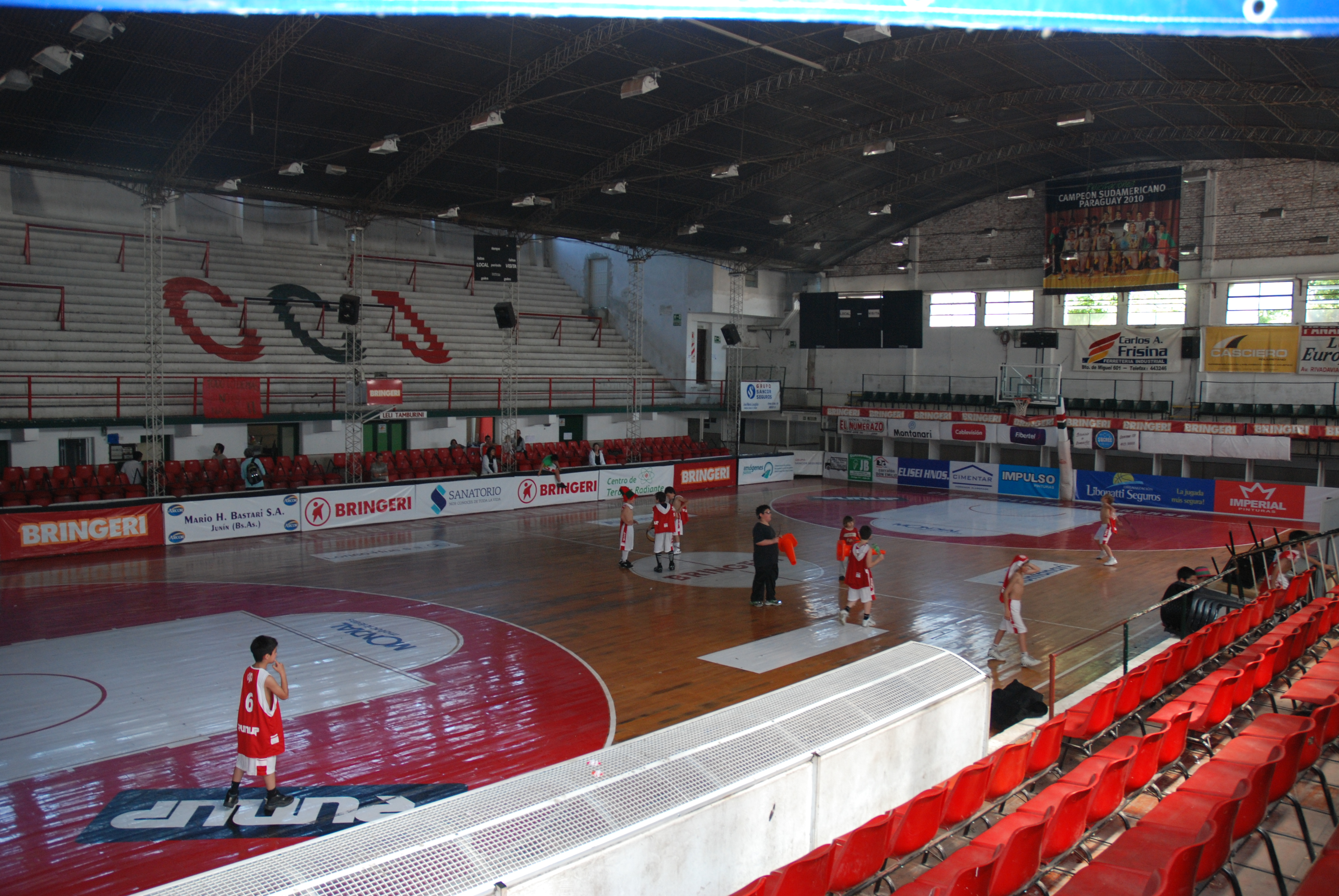
The stadium under construction in 1952 (left), and view of the court and stands in 2012

Ciclista Juninense play their home games at Raúl "Chuni" Merlo Stadium, with an estimated capacity of 2,000. The stadium was opened on 10 December 1955 and was originally known as El Coliseo del Boulevard.

In August 2008, the arena was renamed in honor of Raúl Merlo [es], a notable shooting guard with an extense career of over 30 years that played for Ciclista three times (2000, 2001–04, 2006–07).

== Players ==
=== Current roster ===
Ciclista Juninense roster
Players
Coaches

Pos.	No.	Nat.	Name	Ht.	Age
		(Argentina)	Baracat, Salvador		21 – 7 October 2004
		(Argentina)	Calabró, Francisco		17 – 11 February 2009
		(Argentina)	Costa, Valentín		26 – 25 October 1999

Head coach

- (Argentina) Julián Pagura

Legend

- (C) Team captain
- Injured

- Roster
Updated: 16 Aug 2026

== Titles ==
- Torneo Nacional de Ascenso (1): 2013–14
- Liga Juninense de Básquet (3): 1929, 1952, 1954
