= Estadio Luis Conde =

Indoor arena in Buenos Aires, Argentina

Luis Conde Arena
- Estadio Luis Conde
- La Bombonerita
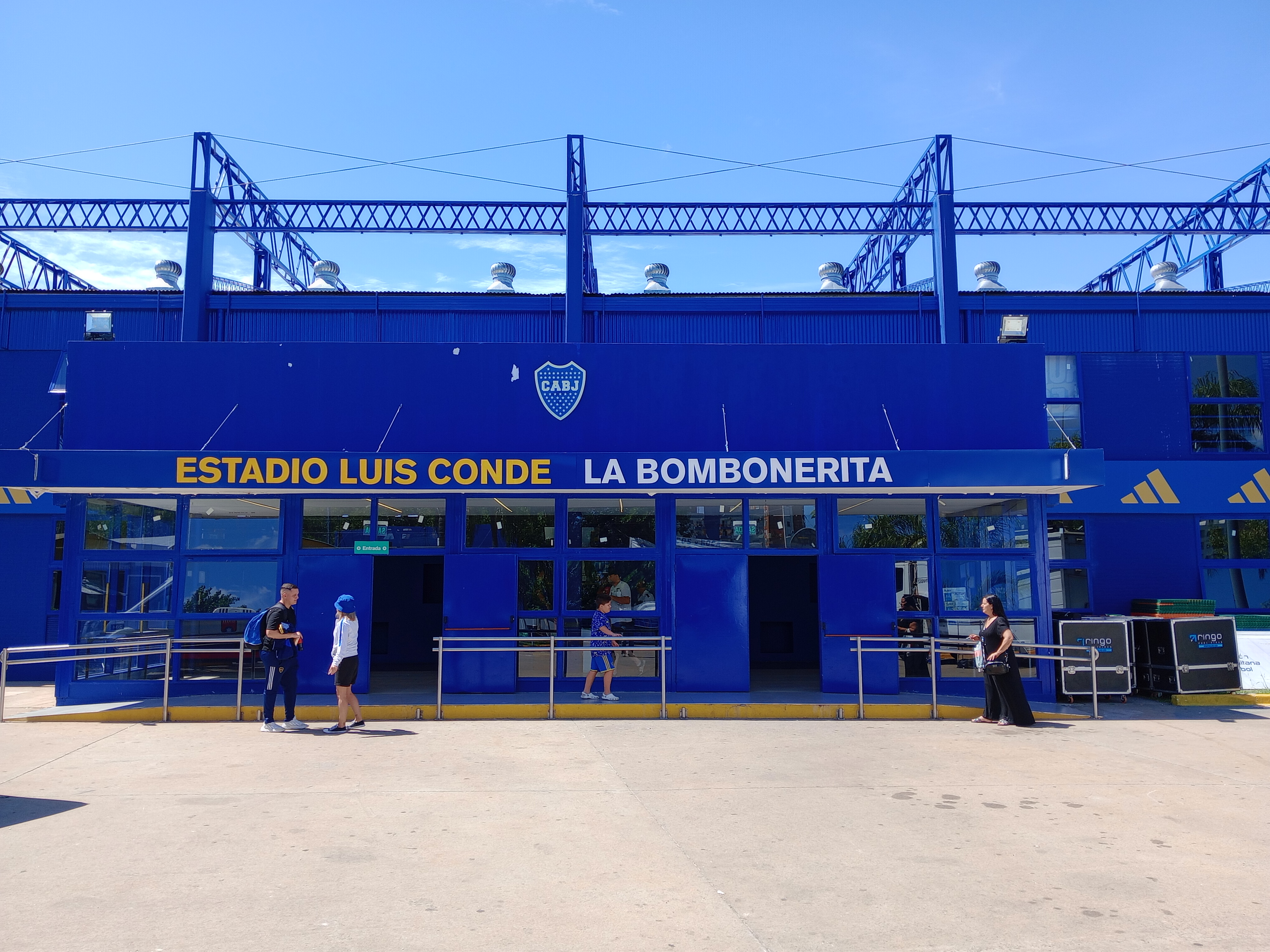
- Exterior view of the arena in 2023
- Interactive map of Luis Conde Arena
- Address: Arzobispo Espinoza 600
- Location: La Boca, Buenos Aires
- Owner: Boca Juniors
- Capacity: 2,400
- Type: Arena
- Surface: Parquet

Construction
- Opened: June 29, 1996; 30 years ago

Tenants
- Boca Juniors teams: basketball, volleyball

The Estadio Luis Conde (also known as La Bombonerita, honoring famous Boca Juniors football stadium, La Bombonera) is an indoor arena located in La Boca, Buenos Aires. Owned by C.A. Boca Juniors, the stadium is the home venue for club's basketball and volleyball teams, that compete at the LNB and Serie A1, respectively.

== Overview ==
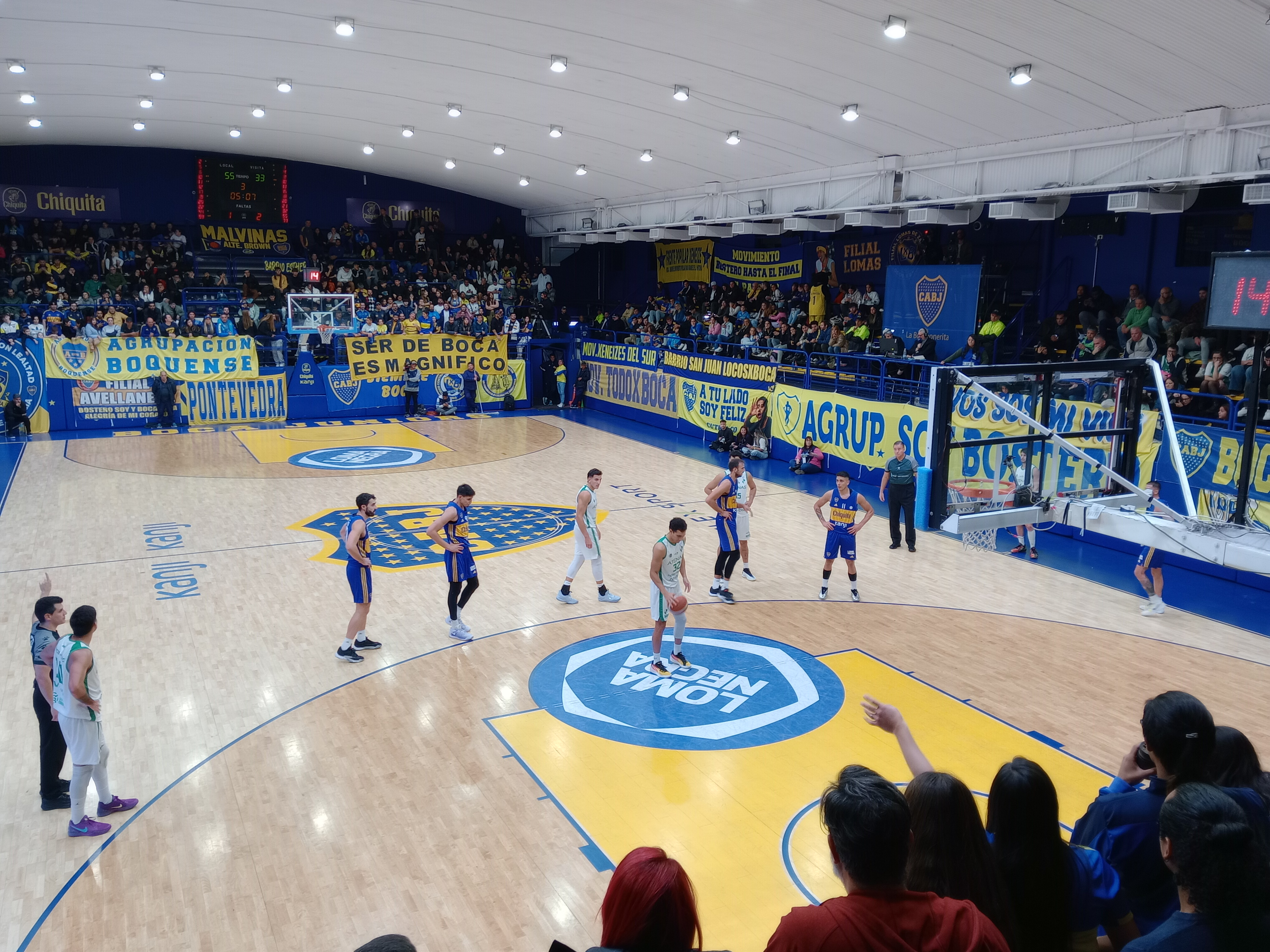
View of the court during the 2024–25 LNB finals

The arena, opened in June 1996, has a capacity for 2,400 people. Boca Juniors played its local games there during the 2002-03, 2003–04, 2004-04 and 2006-07 LNB finals. The Luis Conde stadium was also used by San Martín de Corrientes when the team played the Torneo Nacional de Ascenso finals in 2012-13 because of the Corrientes venue had been closed.

The Boca Juniors volleyball team played the 1996-97 and 2011-12 Liga A1 finals at the Luis Conde. In 1996 Boca played Peñarol de Mar del Plata but lost the title. Other tournament played there by Boca Juniors was the 2012 Copa Master, although the team did not qualify for the finals.

Boca reached another final in 2012 but lost to UPCN San Juan.
