= 9 de Julio de Río Tercero =

9 de Julio
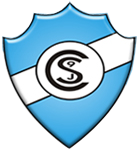
- Full name: Club Sportivo 9 de Julio
- Nickname(s): Patriotas
- Founded: 11 August 1927; 97 years ago
- Ground: Aniceto Hortal, Río Tercero, Córdoba Province (Argentina)
- Capacity: 4500 / 2000
- Chairman: Sergio Sclausero
- Manager: César Miravet (basketball)
- League: Torneo Argentino C (football)
- Website: http://www.9basquet.com.ar/
Home colours	Away colours

Club Sportivo 9 de Julio, known as 9 de Julio or 9 de Julio de Río Tercero, is a sports club based in Río Tercero, Córdoba Province (Argentina). Its football team currently plays in Torneo Argentino C, the regionalised 5th level of Argentine football league system.

== Basketball ==
The basketball team currently plays in the Torneo Nacional de Ascenso, which is the second division of the Argentine Basketball Federation. 9 de Julio home games are played at Estadio José Albert.

=== Notable players ===
- Jerome Meyinsse (born 1988)
