= Monte Hermoso Básquetbol =

- Leagues: Liga Nacional de Básquet
- Founded: 2006; 20 years ago
- Arena: Polideportivo Municipal
- Location: Monte Hermoso, Buenos Aires Province, Argentina
- President: Fernando Alejo
- Head coach: Mauricio Santangelo
- Championships: 1 Torneo Nacional de Ascenso
- Website: montehermosobasket.com.ar
Home	Away

Monte Hermoso Básquetbol is a basketball club located in Monte Hermoso, Buenos Aires Province, Argentina.

== Honours ==
- Torneo Nacional de Ascenso (1):

2006–07
