= La Liga Argentina de Básquet =

La Liga Argentina de Básquetbol
- Organising body: Asociación de Clubes de Básquet
- Founded: 1992; 34 years ago
- Country: Argentina
- Divisions: 2
- Number of teams: 34
- Level on pyramid: 2
- Promotion to: Liga Nacional
- Relegation to: Torneo Federal
- Current champions: Lanús (2025–26)
- Most championships: Libertad; Quilmes (MdP); La Unión; (2 titles each)
- TV partners: Básquet Pass; DeporTV; DirecTV Sports
- Website: lnb.com.ar/laligaargentina

La Liga Argentina de Básquetbol (in English "The Argentine Basketball League"), previously known as the Torneo Nacional de Ascenso (abbreviated "TNA", in English "National Promotion Tournament") is the second division of the Argentine basketball league system.

The La Liga's predecessor is the Torneo Federal de Básquetbol, which became the third division when the LLA was created in 1992.

== History ==
The competition was established in 1992, originally named "Torneo Nacional de Ascenso" (National Promotion Tournament), therefore then second division Primera Nacional B [es] became the third division. The new tournament featured a division with sixteen participants, one direct promotion, and two relegations. Additionally, a "relegation playoff" series was held between the second-to-last team in the Liga Nacional and the runner-up of the Torneo Nacional, a format that ran from the inaugural season (1992-93) until the 1998-99 season.

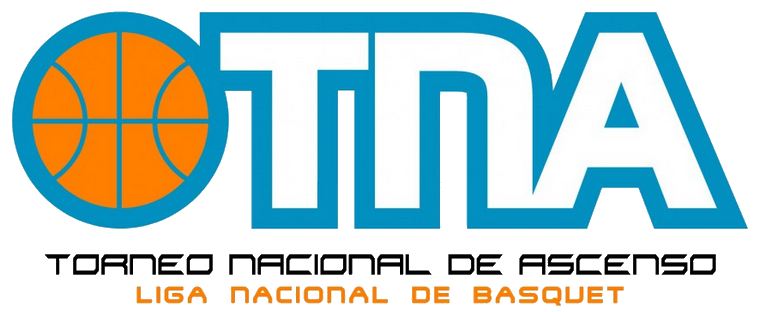
Logo of "Torneo Nacional de Ascenso", Liga Argentina's original name in 1992

Until the 2000–01 season, the tournament had sixteen teams; the following season saw fourteen, a trend that lasted two seasons before returning to the original number the next. However, this number fluctuated for several seasons. Throughout these seasons, the competition format consisted of two regular phases. In the first phase, teams were divided according to their geographical location in Argentina, and in the second phase, they were divided according to the results obtained in the first stage. In the 2008-09 season, an additional stage was added to the tournament: the playoff for the second promotion spot. This included the teams eliminated in the semifinals and the team that lost the final.

In 2011, the league decided to invite more participants, reaching twenty-one teams, and then settling at twenty for 2012. The 2011–12 season was the last to use the old format, as in 2012–13 a new system was implemented whereby teams from the northern region of the country would not face those from the southern region until the later stages, thus ensuring that both regions had guaranteed participation throughout the tournament.

In 2013, before the start of the 2013–14 season, the "Asociación de Clubes de Básquet" (ACB), organizer of the top two national divisions, decided to implement a relegation freeze in the top division. This affected the TNA, reducing the number of teams competing by two.

In 2014, before the start of the 2014–15 season, the organization decided to hold the season without relegations to the Torneo Federal de Básquetbol (Federal Basketball Tournament) but with promotions to the Liga Nacional (National League), thus maintaining the number of teams in the tournament. That same year, a few months after announcing the league's closure, the number of teams was increased to 24.

In 2015, the league expanded again, going from 24 to 28 teams, further regionalizing the competition. However, this plan failed, and the 2015-16 season was played with 26 teams, a number that was repeated the following season.

Finally, the league reached 28 teams for the 2017–18 season, the same season in which the tournament was renamed "La Liga Argentina" (The Argentine League). In that same tournament, a particular event occurred when Club Atlético Temperley was suspended from the tournament for repeated offenses, including several intrusions by the club president onto the playing field and the disregard for the measures taken by the organization by both the club and the president. As a result, Temperley's place was suspended for 120 days, while the teams that had to compete to avoid relegation, Echagüe de Paraná and Gimnasia de La Plata, maintained their place in the league.

== Competition format ==
La Liga Argentina consists of 34 teams, which are divided into two conferences, "norte" and "sur", with 17 teams per zone. The competition format is similar to that of Liga Nacional, with a regular season divided into two stages. In the first stage, teams from the same division compete in a double round-robin tournament format, with standings determined by a points system.

The twelve best placed teams of each zone qualify to the post season, with stages of reclassification, quarter finals, semifinals, and finals. The four best placed teams (1st to 4th) of each zone qualify directly to quarter finals while teams positioned 5th to 12th must play a reclassification stage (where teams play each other in order to qualify to quarter finals).

== Current clubs (2025–26) ==
=== Norte conference ===
Club	City	Province	Venue	Capac.
Amancay	La Rioja	La Rioja	Cristóbal Romero	
Barrio Parque [es]	Córdoba	Córdoba	El Teatro del Parque	700
Bochas SC	Colonia Caroya [es]	Córdoba	José Pepe Nou	
Colón	Santa Fe	Santa Fe	Roque Otrino	400
Comunicaciones	Mercedes	Buenos Aires	Estadio Comunicaciones	3,500
Estudiantes [es]	San Miguel	Tucumán	Coco Ascarate	1,300
Fusión Riojana	La Rioja	La Rioja		
Hindú	Córdoba	Córdoba	Eduardo Pintos	
Huracán [es]	Las Heras	Mendoza	Vicente Polimeni	
Independiente [es]	Santiago del Estero	Santiago del Estero	Israel Parnas	1,000
Jujuy Básquet	San Salvador	Jujuy	Federación de Básquet	2,000
CD Rivadavia	Rivadavia	Mendoza	Leopoldo Brozovix	900
Salta Básket [es]	Salta	Salta	Estadio Delmi	10,000
San Isidro [es]	San Francisco	Córdoba	Antonio Manno	2,200
Santa Paula	Gálvez	Santa Fe	Víctor Comelli	
Sportivo Suardi	Suardi [es]	Santa Fe	Gigante de la Avenida	
Tomás de Rocamora [es]	Concepción del Uruguay	Entre Ríos	Julio Paccagnella	1,000
Villa San Martín [es]	Resistencia	Chaco	Estadio Villa San Martín	

=== Sur conference ===
Club	City	Province	Venue	Capac.
Centenario FCCD	Venado Tuerto	Santa Fe	Mateo Migiliore	
Central Entrerriano	Gualeguaychú	Entre Ríos	José María Bértora	
Ciclista Juninense	Junín	Buenos Aires	Coliseo del Boulevard	2,500
Deportivo Norte	Armstrong	Santa Fe	Jorge Ferrero	1,200
Deportivo Viedma	Viedma	Río Negro	Ángel Arias	2,500
El Talar [es]	Buenos Aires	(autonomous city)	Polideportivo Las Malvinas	
Gimnasia y Esgrima	La Plata	Buenos Aires	Víctor Nethol	3,000
Lanús	Lanús	Buenos Aires	Antonio Rotili	3,000
La Unión [es]	Colón	Entre Ríos	Carlos Delasoie	1,300
Pergamino Básquet	Pergamino	Buenos Aires	Ricardo Merlo	200
Pico FC [es]	General Pico	La Pampa	Parque Ángel Larrea	2,000
Provincial	Rosario	Santa Fe	Salvador Bonilla	
Quilmes	Mar del Plata	Buenos Aires	José Martinez	1,000
Racing Club	Avellaneda	Buenos Aires	Centro Deportivo Racing	
Unión	Mar del Plata	Buenos Aires	Polideportivo Islas Malvinas	8,000
Villa Mitre	Bahía Blanca	Buenos Aires	Jose Martinez	2,800

== List of champions ==
=== Finals ===
#	Season	Champion	Series	Runner-up
1	1992–93	Deportivo Roca	3–0	Independiente (GP)
2	1993–94	Deportivo Valle Inferior (Note: From Viedma.)	3–2	Pico FC
3	1994–95	Luz y Fuerza (Note: From Posadas, Misiones)	3–2	Mendoza de Regatas
4	1995–96	Obras Sanitarias	3–1	Estudiantes (O)
5	1996–97	Belgrano (SN)	3–0	Newell's Old Boys
6	1997–98	Libertad	3–2	SIDERCA (Note: From Campana in Buenos Aires Province.)
7	1998–99	Quilmes (MdP)	3–2	Central Entrerriano
8	1999–00	Belgrano (T) (Note: From San Miguel de Tucumán)	3–2	Gimnasia y Esgrima (LP)
9	2000–01	Gimnasia y Esgrima (LP)	3–1	Regatas (C)
10	2001–02	Ben Hur	3–0	Ciclista Juninense
11	2002–03	Central Entrerriano	3–2	Argentino (J)
12	2003–04	River Plate	3–0	Regatas (C)
13	2004–05	La Unión	3–1	Ciclista Juninense
14	2005–06	Sionista	3–0	Quimsa
15	2006–07	El Nacional	2–0	Independiente (N)
16	2007–08	Ciclista Olímpico	2–0	Lanús
17	2008–09	La Unión (2)	3–0	Unión (Sun)
18	2009–10	Argentino (J)	3–0	San Martín (C)
19	2010–11	Quilmes (MdP) (2)	3–1	San Martín (C)
20	2011–12	Unión Progresista (Note: From Villa Ángela in Chaco province.)	3–0	Argentino (J)
21	2012–13	Estudiantes (C)	3–2	San Martín (C)
22	2013–14	Ciclista Juninense	3–0	Instituto
23	2014–15	Instituto	3–2	9 de Julio (RT)
24	2015–16	Hispano Americano	3–2	Barrio Parque
25	2016–17	Comunicaciones (M)	3–2	Estudiantes (O)
26	2017–18	Libertad (2)	3–0	Estudiantes (O)
27	2018–19	Platense	3–2	San Isidro (SF)
28	2019–20	(unfinished season due to COVID-19 pandemic)		
29	2021	Unión (SF)	3–1	Villa Mitre
30	2021–22	Independiente (O)	3–0	Zárate Básket
31	2022–23	Zárate Básket	3–2	Ameghino (Note: From Villa María in Córdoba province.)
32	2023–24	Atenas	3–0	Racing (Ch)
33	2024–25	Racing (Ch)	3–0	San Isidro (SF)
34	2025–26	Lanús	3–0	San Isidro (SF)

== Titles by club ==
Club	Titles	Winning years
Libertad	2	1997–98, 2017–18
Quilmes (MdP)	2	1998–99, 2010–11
La Unión	2	2004–05, 2008–09
