= Club Deportivo Libertad =

Argentine sports club

Libertad
- Full name: Club Deportivo Libertad
- Nickname(s): Tigre; Cañonero
- Founded: 25 May 1910; 115 years ago
- Ground: Hogar de Los Tigres, Sunchales, Santa Fe Province
- Capacity: 4,000
- Chairman: Ernesto Bosco
- Manager: Fabio Demti
- League: Torneo Argentino A (football)
- 2011–12: 8th
- Website: http://www.libertadsunchales.com.ar/
Home colours	Away colours

Club Deportivo Libertad (usually called simply Libertad or Libertad de Sunchales) is a sports club from Argentina, with homebase in the Sunchales city of Santa Fe Province. The club is better known for both its association football and basketball teams.

Apart from those sports, other disciplines hosted by Libertad are bocce, equestrianism, karate, roller skating, tennis, and volleyball.

== Football ==
The club's football team was founded in May 1910 and defeated the now-defunct Atlético Sunchales 3-1 in its first friendly match. The club now plays in the Torneo Argentino A, the regionalized 3rd level of Argentine football. Club's most important achievement has been gaining promotion to the Argentino A during the 2006–07 season of the Torneo Argentino B.

== Squad of 2011–12 ==
Note: Flags indicate national team as defined under FIFA eligibility rules; some limited exceptions apply. Players may hold more than one non-FIFA nationality.

No.	Pos.	Nation	Player
—	GK	(Argentina) ARG	Iván Baigorra
—	GK	(Argentina) ARG	Nicolás Caprio
—	GK	(Argentina) ARG	Emanuel Celiz
—	DF	(Argentina) ARG	Jesús De Los Santos
—	DF	(Argentina) ARG	Federico Allende
—	DF	(Argentina) ARG	Javier Felipe
—	DF	(Argentina) ARG	Walter Ferrero
—	DF	(Argentina) ARG	Hugo Ficetto
—	DF	(Argentina) ARG	Marcelo Juarez
—	DF	(Argentina) ARG	Mauricio Mansilla
—	DF	(Argentina) ARG	Aníbal Roldán
—	DF	(Argentina) ARG	Sebastián Vezzani
—	DF	(Argentina) ARG	Gabriel Zuvinikar
—	MF	(Argentina) ARG	Víctor Hugo Cejas
—	MF	(Argentina) ARG	Walter Cuder
—	MF	(Argentina) ARG	Luciano D'Antoli

No.	Pos.	Nation	Player
—	MF	(Argentina) ARG	Flavio Díaz
—	MF	(Argentina) ARG	Jonathan Lastra
—	MF	(Argentina) ARG	Ezequiel Lezcano
—	MF	(Argentina) ARG	Matías Morgada
—	MF	(Argentina) ARG	Gerardo Puchetta
—	MF	(Argentina) ARG	César Quiroga
—	MF	(Argentina) ARG	Marcos Quiroga
—	MF	(Argentina) ARG	Francisco Rinaudo
—	MF	(Argentina) ARG	Ezequiel Saavedra
—	FW	(Argentina) ARG	Maximiliano Antonelli
—	FW	(Argentina) ARG	Paolo Berardi
—	FW	(Argentina) ARG	Leonardo Elizalde
—	FW	(Argentina) ARG	Emiliano Ghietto
—	FW	(Argentina) ARG	Emiliano Nieto
—	FW	(Argentina) ARG	Leonardo Secondi
—	FW	(Argentina) ARG	Rodrigo Mannara

== Basketball ==
The basketball team currently plays at the top division of Argentine league system, the Liga Nacional de Básquet (LNB). The club's home arena is the Hogar de Los Tigres. Libertad won the Argentine league once (2007–08 season), and the South American league twice (2002 and 2007). They also won the Torneo Top 4 of the 2002–03 season.

=== Kit uniform ===
Home Kit	Away Kit

=== Current roster ===
Libertad roster
Players
Coaches

Pos.	No.	Nat.	Name	Ht.	Age
PF	5	(Argentina)	Ingratta, Bruno	2.00 m (6 ft 7 in)	40 – 19 April 1985
SF	8	(Argentina)	Sotelo, Gonzalo	2.00 m (6 ft 7 in)	32 – 1 May 1993
PG	9	(Argentina)	Figueredo, Diego	1.85 m (6 ft 1 in)	33 – 27 December 1991
SG	12	(Argentina)	Zago, Ernesto	2.00 m (6 ft 7 in)	39 – 4 October 1985
SF	13	(Argentina)	Ceruti, Mariano	1.95 m (6 ft 5 in)	45 – 15 July 1979
PF	14	(Venezuela)	Ruiz, Miguel	2.02 m (6 ft 8 in)	34 – 20 December 1990
SG	22	(Argentina)	Saglietti, Marcos	1.90 m (6 ft 3 in)	39 – 2 January 1986
C	24	(United States)	Roberts, Lee	2.02 m (6 ft 8 in)	38 – 10 February 1987
SF	44	(Argentina)	Cuello, Martín	1.90 m (6 ft 3 in)	32 – 12 March 1993

Head coach

- (Argentina) Federico Muller

Assistant coach(es)

- (Argentina) Gustavo Lucato

Legend

- (C) Team captain
- Injured

- Roster
Updated: 2019-07-01

=== Honours ===
- Torneo Nacional de Ascenso (2): 1997–98, 2017–18
