= Ciclista Olímpico =

Olímpico
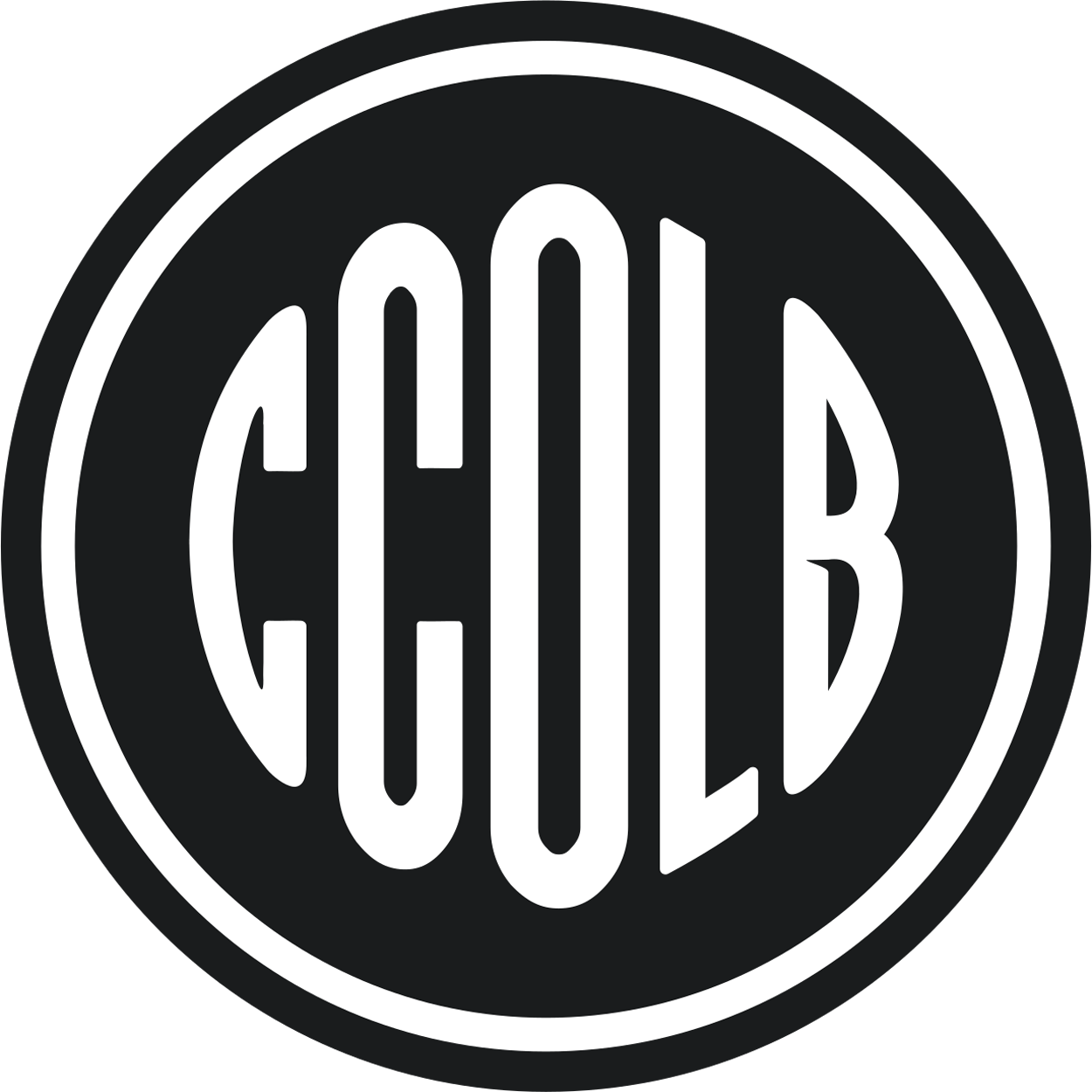
- Nickname: Negro
- Leagues: Liga Nacional de Básquet; Liga Sudamericana
- Founded: 9 December 1921; 104 years ago
- Arena: Vicente Rosales
- Location: La Banda, Santiago del Estero, Argentina
- Team colors
- President: Luis Moukarsel
- Head coach: Guillermo Narvarte
- Website: ciclistaolimpico.com.ar
Home	Away

Club Olímpico La Banda, also known as simply Olímpico La Banda, is an Argentine sports club based in La Banda, Santiago del Estero. The club is mostly known for its basketball team, which currently plays in the Liga Nacional de Básquet (LNB), the top division of the Argentine league system.

Other sports practised at the club are field hockey, women's football, rugby union, swimming, tennis and volleyball.

== History ==
The club was founded as "Ciclista Olímpico" ("Olympic Bicycle racer" in English) on December 9, 1921, first with bicycle racing as the main activity such as its name indicated. Soon, the club incorporated basketball as a new activity, being the first club in Santiago del Estero where members could play that sport.

== Current roster ==
Olímpico La Banda roster
Players
Coaches

Pos.	No.	Nat.	Name	Ht.	Age
G	2	(Venezuela)	Mijares, Edwin	1.86 m (6 ft 1 in)	33 – 26 October 1992
SG	4	(Argentina)	Barco, Jeremias	2.00 m (6 ft 7 in)	21 – 16 June 2005
PF	6	(Argentina)	Romegialli, Santino	2.04 m (6 ft 8 in)	23 – 27 May 2003
G/F	7	(Argentina)	Forestier, Valentín	1.94 m (6 ft 4 in)	23 – 8 July 2003
G	8	(Argentina)	Vieta, Franco	1.89 m (6 ft 2 in)	33 – 3 November 1992
PG	9	(Argentina)	Facello, Agustín	1.83 m (6 ft 0 in)	27 – 18 August 1999
PG	10	(Argentina)	Aliende, Guillermo	1.79 m (5 ft 10 in)	29 – 31 July 1997
G	11	(Argentina)	Pérez, Santiago	1.88 m (6 ft 2 in)	24 – 10 August 2002
C	12	(Argentina)	Bressán, Gonzalo	2.06 m (6 ft 9 in)	24 – 16 November 2001
PF/C	13	(Venezuela)	Ascanio, José	2.03 m (6 ft 8 in)	30 – 10 January 1996
F	14	(Argentina)	Ballarín, Gonzalo	2.01 m (6 ft 7 in)	19 – 16 July 2007
PF	32	(United States)	Granberry, Richard	2.03 m (6 ft 8 in)	32 – 22 August 1993

Head coach

- (Argentina) Leonardo Gutierrez

Assistant coach(es)

- (Argentina) Julian Pagura

PD:.-.

Legend

- (C) Team captain
- Injured

- Roster
Updated: 2020-02-23

== Notable players ==
To appear in this section a player must have either:
- Set a club record or won an individual award as a professional player.
- Played at least one official international match for his senior national team at any time.

- (Argentina) Iván Basualdo
- (Argentina) Alejandro Diez
- (Argentina) Juan Pablo Figueroa
- (Argentina) Jonatan Machuca
- (Colombia) Michaell Jackson
- (Dominican Republic) Gelvis Solano
- (North Macedonia) Jeremiah Massey
- (Puerto Rico) Ramon Clemente
- (Puerto Rico) Guillermo Diaz
- (United States) Dionte Christmas
- (United States) Djibril Kante
- (United States) Kyle Lamonte
- (United States) Darren Phillip
- (United States) Justin Williams

== Head coaches ==
- (Argentina) (Italy) Fernando Duró
- (Argentina) Adrian Capelli
