= Liga Nacional de Básquet Awards =

The Liga Nacional de Básquet Awards (English: National Basketball League Awards) are the yearly individual awards that are given by Argentina's top-tier level men's professional club basketball league, the Liga Nacional de Básquet (LNB), or "La Liga".

== MVP ==
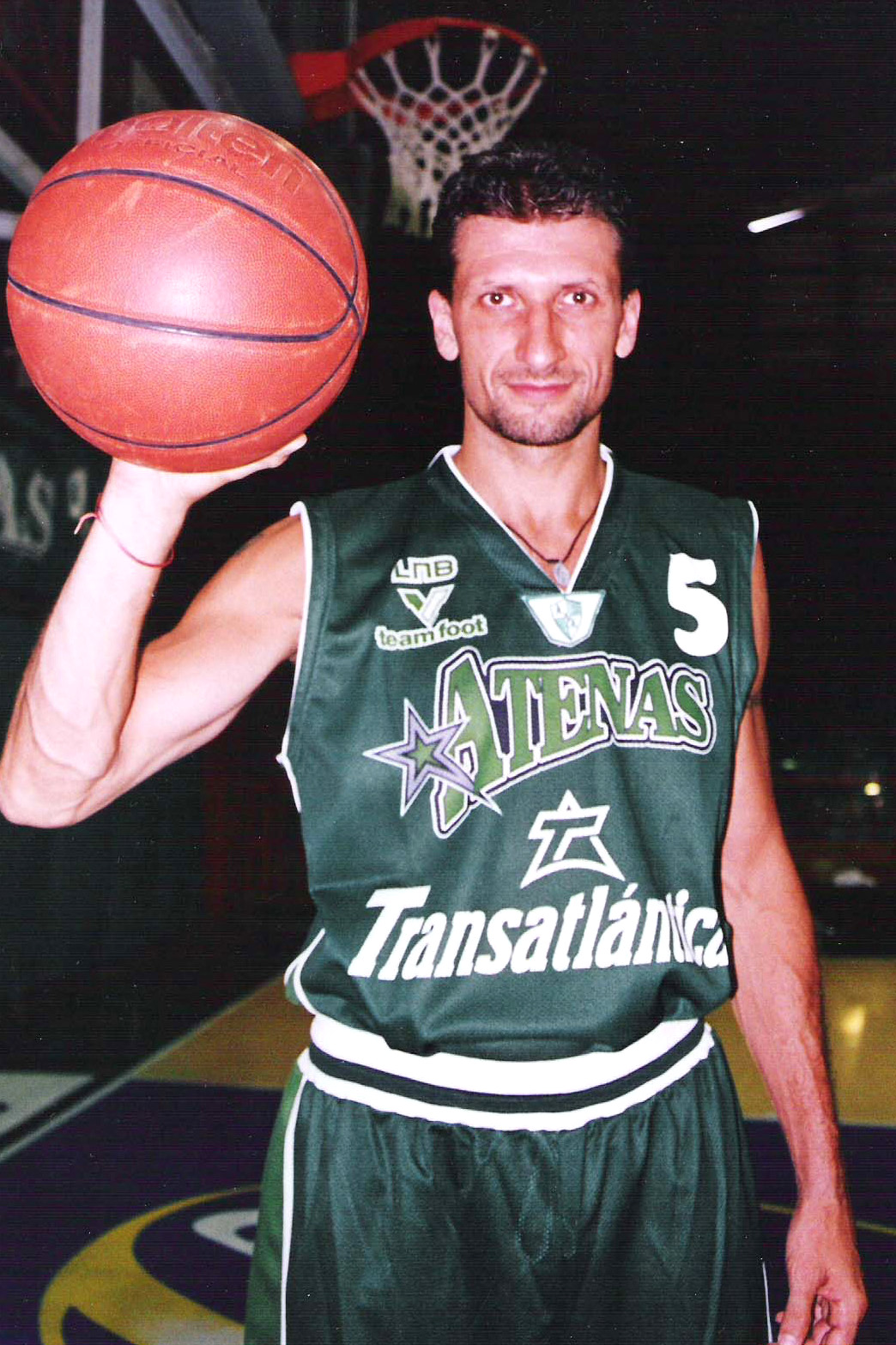
Héctor Campana, 4× Argentine League MVP (1989, 1990, 1991, 1999).

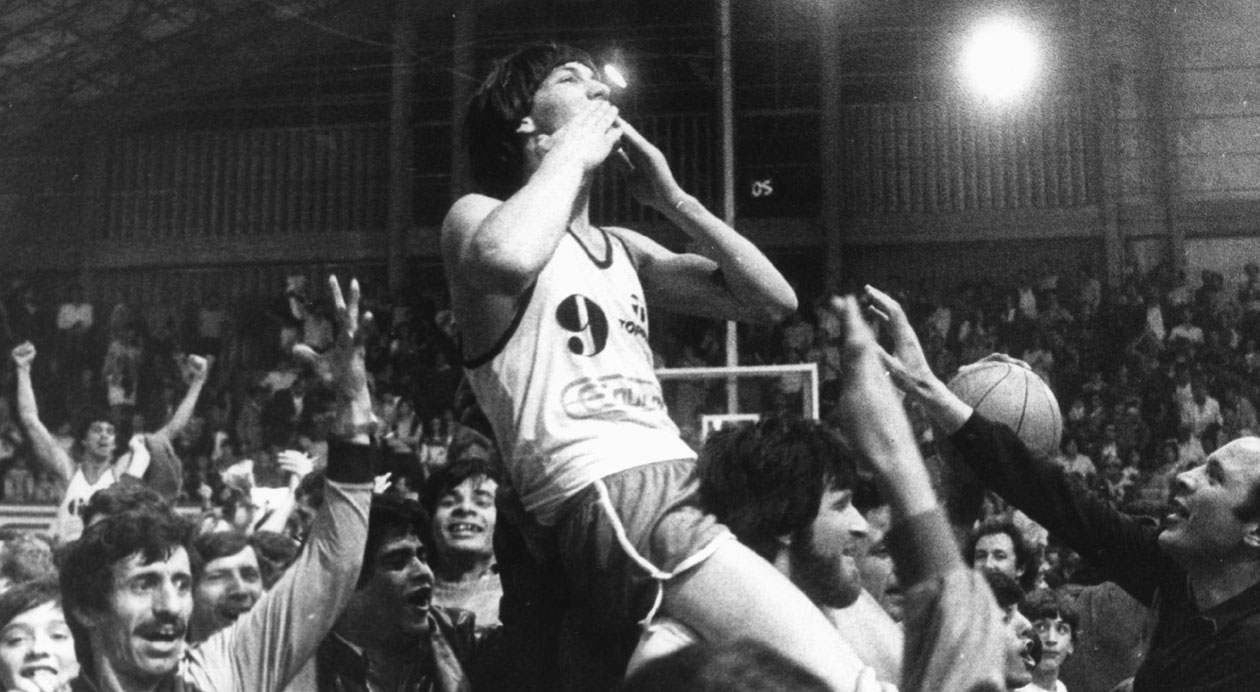
Marcelo Milanesio (#9), 2× Argentine League MVP (1992, 1994).

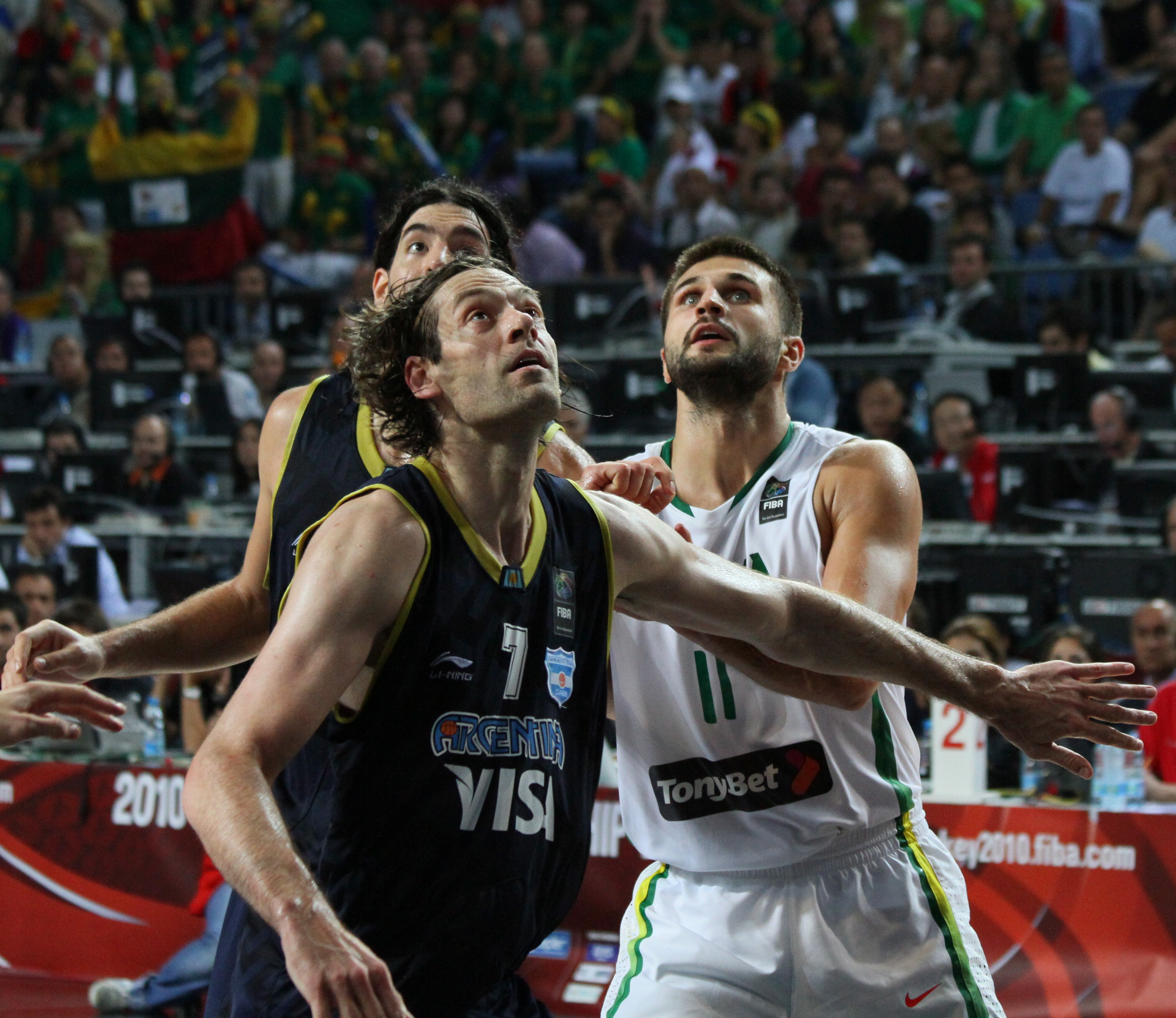
Fabricio Oberto (#7 in dark blue), Argentine League MVP (1998).

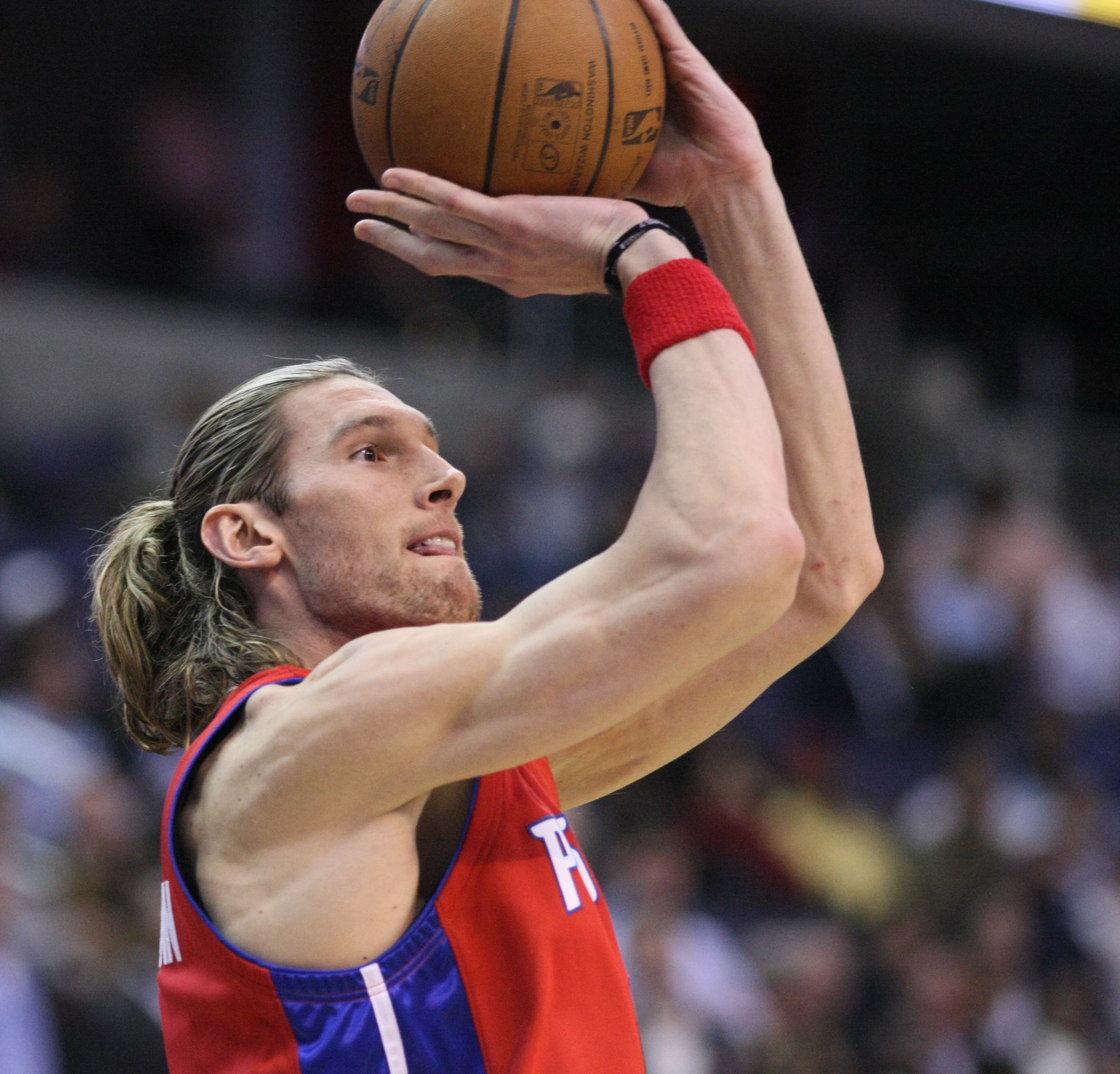
Walter Herrmann, 2× Argentine League MVP (2001, 2014).

- Player nationality by national team:

The Liga Nacional de Básquet (LNB) MVP is an annual award that is given to the Most Valuable Player of the regular season of the Argentine Basketball League. The award first began with the 1987 season.

Player (X)	Denotes the number of times the player has been selected.

Season	League MVP	Club
1987	(Argentina) Germán Filloy	Atenas
1988	(not selected)	(not selected)
1989	(Argentina) Héctor Campana	River Plate
1990	(Argentina) Héctor Campana (2)	River Plate
1990–91	(Argentina) Héctor Campana (3)	GEPU
1991–92	(Argentina) Marcelo Milanesio	Atenas
1992–93	(Argentina) Juan Espil	GEPU
1993–94	(Argentina) Marcelo Milanesio (2)	Atenas
1994–95	(Argentina) Hernán Montenegro	Gimnasia (CR)
1995–96	(Argentina) Jorge Racca	Olimpia (VT)
1996–97	(Argentina) Jorge Racca (2)	Olimpia (VT)
1997–98	(Argentina) Fabricio Oberto	Atenas
1998–99	(Argentina) Héctor Campana (4)	Atenas
1999–00	(Argentina) Rubén Wolkowyski	Estudiantes (O)
2000–01	(Argentina) Walter Herrmann	Atenas
2001–02	(Argentina) Dani Farabello	Quilmes (MDP)
2002–03	(Argentina) Bruno Lábaque	Atenas
2003–04	(Argentina) Roberto López	GELP
2004–05	(Argentina) Leo Gutiérrez	Ben Hur
2005–06	(Argentina) Leo Gutiérrez (2)	Ben Hur
2006–07	(Argentina) Gabriel Mikulas	Peñarol
2007–08	(Argentina) Leo Gutiérrez (3)	Boca Juniors
2008–09	(United States) David Jackson	Peñarol
2009–10	(Argentina) Leo Gutiérrez (4)	Peñarol
2010–11	(Argentina) J. P. Gutiérrez	Obras Sanitarias
2011–12	(Argentina) J. P. Gutiérrez (2)	Obras Sanitarias
2012–13	(Argentina) Paolo Quinteros	Regatas
2013–14	(Argentina) Walter Herrmann (2)	Atenas
2014–15	(Argentina) Nicolás Aguirre	Quimsa
2015–16	(United States) Justin Williams	Ciclista Olímpico
2016–17	(Jordan) Dar Tucker	Estudiantes Concordia
2017–18	(Argentina) Gabriel Deck	San Lorenzo
2018–19	(Argentina) Marcos Mata	San Lorenzo
2019–20	Cancelled due to COVID-19 pandemic	
2020–21	(Argentina) Fernando Zurbriggen	Obras Sanitarias
2021–22	(United States) Eric Anderson	Quimsa
2022–23	(Cuba) Yoanki Mencia	Gimnasia y Esgrima
2023–24	(United States) Brandon Robinson	Quimsa
2024–25	(Argentina) José Vildoza	Boca Juniors

=== Players with multiple MVP awards ===
Player	Awards Won	Years won
(Argentina) Héctor Campana	4	(1989, 1990, 1991, 1999)
(Argentina) Leo Gutiérrez	4	(2005, 2006, 2008, 2010)
(Argentina) Marcelo Milanesio	2	(1992, 1994)
(Argentina) Jorge Racca	2	(1996, 1997)
(Argentina) Walter Herrmann	2	(2001, 2014)
(Argentina) J. P. Gutiérrez	2	(2011, 2012)

== Finals MVP ==
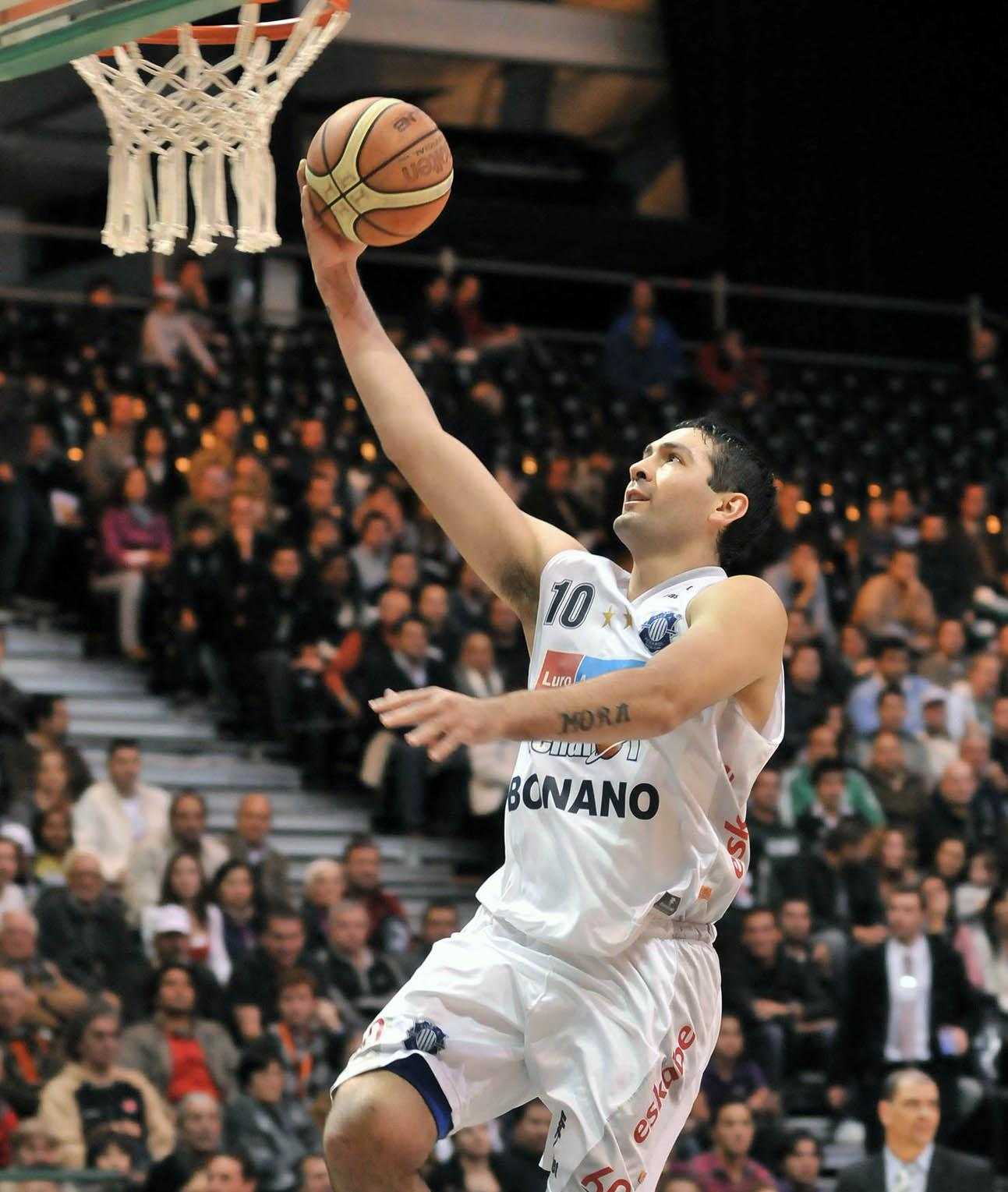
Leo Gutiérrez, 4× Argentine League Finals MVP (2005, 2007, 2010, 2011).

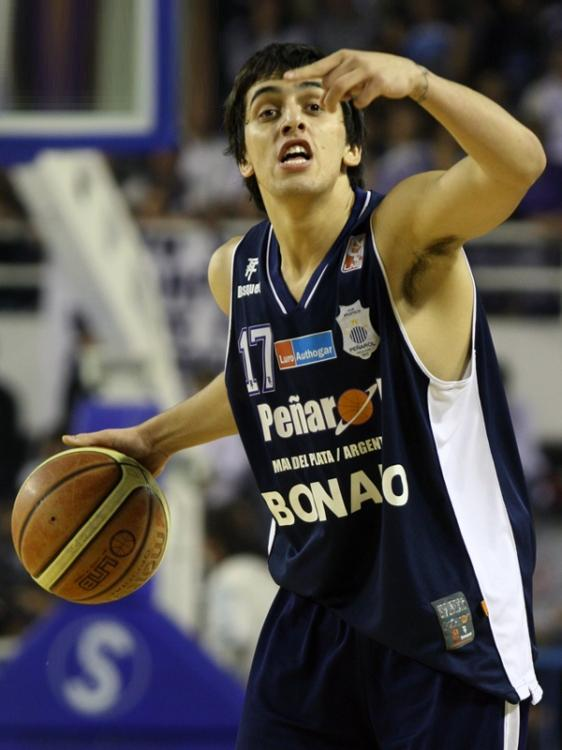
Facu Campazzo, 2× Argentine League Finals MVP (2012, 2014).

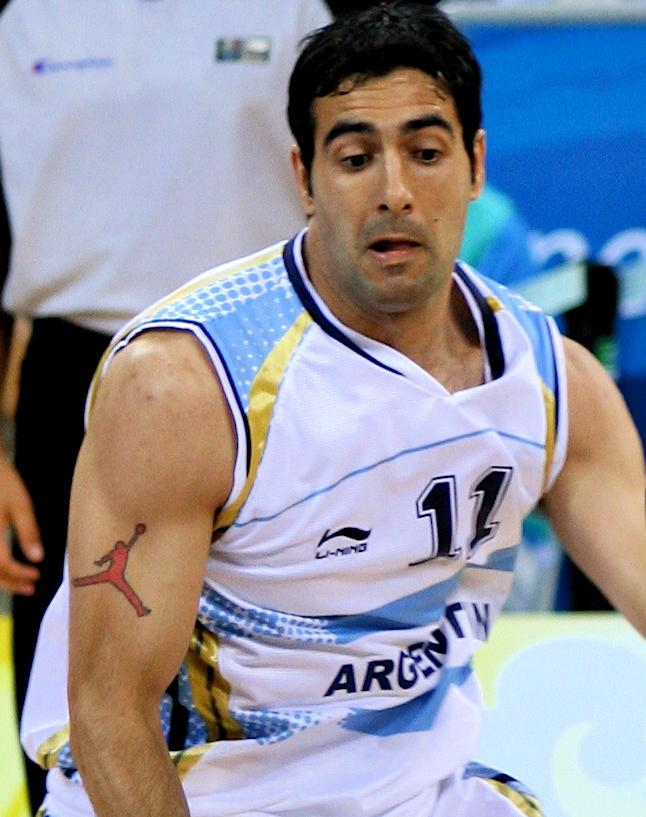
Paolo Quinteros, Argentine League Finals MVP (2013).

- Player nationality by national team:

The Liga Nacional de Básquet (LNB) Finals MVP is an annual award that is given to the Most Valuable Player of the Argentine Basketball League's Playoff's Finals. The award first began with the 1985 season.

Player (X)	Denotes the number of times the player has been selected.
Player (in bold)	Indicates a player that also won the LNB MVP award in the same season.

Season	Finals MVP	Club
1985	(Argentina) Sebastián Uranga	Ferro
1986	(United States) Mike Schlegel	Ferro
1987	(Argentina) Héctor Campana	Atenas
1988	(Argentina) Carlos Cerutti	Atenas
1989	(United States) Jim Thomas	Ferro
1990	(Argentina) Marcelo Milanesio	Atenas
1990–91	(Argentina) Héctor Campana (2)	GEPU
1991–92	(Argentina) Héctor Campana (3)	Atenas
1992–93	(Argentina) Juan Espil	GEPU
1993–94	(Argentina) Esteban De la Fuente	Peñarol
1994–95	(Argentina) Esteban De la Fuente (2)	Independiente (GP)
1995–96	(Argentina) Jorge Racca	Olimpia (VT)
1996–97	(United States) Byron Wilson	Boca Juniors
1997–98	(Argentina) Fabricio Oberto	Atenas
1998–99	(Argentina) Diego Osella	Atenas
1999–00	(Argentina) Rubén Wolkowyski	Estudiantes (O)
2000–01	(United States) Byron Wilson (2)	Estudiantes (O)
2001–02	(Argentina) Walter Herrmann	Atenas
2002–03	(Argentina) Diego Lo Grippo	Atenas
2003–04	(United States) Byron Wilson (3)	Boca Juniors
2004–05	(Argentina) Leo Gutiérrez	Ben Hur
2005–06	(Argentina) Gabriel Cocha	Gimnasia y Esgrima (CR)
2006–07	(Argentina) Leo Gutiérrez (2)	Boca Juniors
2007–08	(United States) Laron Profit	Libertad
2008–09	(United States) Andre Laws	Atenas
2009–10	(Argentina) Leo Gutiérrez (3)	Peñarol
2010–11	(Argentina) Leo Gutiérrez (4)	Peñarol
2011–12	(Argentina) Facu Campazzo	Peñarol
2012–13	(Argentina) **Paolo Quinteros**	Regatas (C)
2013–14	(Argentina) Facu Campazzo (2)	Peñarol
2014–15	(United States) Robert Battle	Quimsa
2015–16	(Argentina) Walter Herrmann (2)	San Lorenzo
2016–17	(Argentina) Gabriel Deck	San Lorenzo
2017–18	(Argentina) **Gabriel Deck** (2)	San Lorenzo
2018–19	(Jordan) Dar Tucker	San Lorenzo
2019–20	Cancelled due to COVID-19 pandemic	
2020–21	(Argentina) José Vildoza	San Lorenzo
2021–22	(Argentina) Martín Cuello	Instituto
2022–23	(United States) Eric Anderson	Quimsa
2023–24	(Argentina) José Vildoza (2)	Boca Juniors
2024–25	(Argentina) **José Vildoza** (3)	Boca Juniors

=== Players with multiple Finals MVP awards ===
Player	Awards Won	Years won
(Argentina) Leo Gutiérrez	4	(2005, 2007, 2010, 2011)
(Argentina) Héctor Campana	3	(1987, 1991, 1992)
(United States) Byron Wilson	3	(1997, 2001, 2004)
(Argentina) José Vildoza	3	(2021, 2024, 2025)
(Argentina) Esteban De la Fuente	2	(1994, 1995)
(Argentina) Walter Herrmann	2	(2002, 2016)
(Argentina) Facu Campazzo	2	(2012, 2014)
(Argentina) Gabriel Deck	2	(2017, 2018)

== Best Foreign Player ==
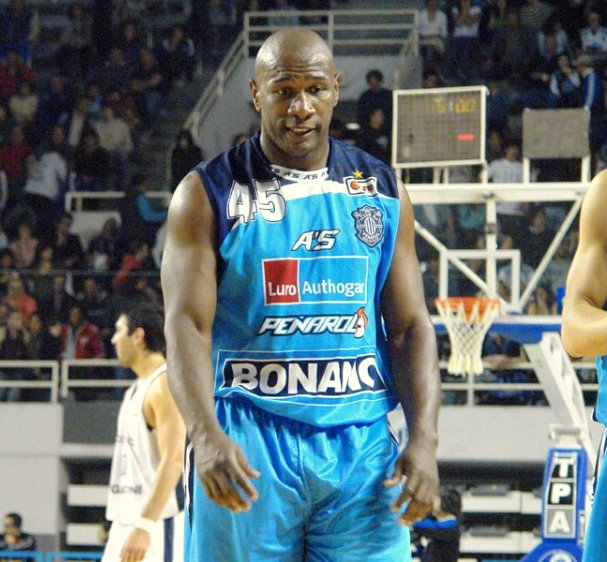
Byron Wilson, Argentine League Best Foreign Player (1998).

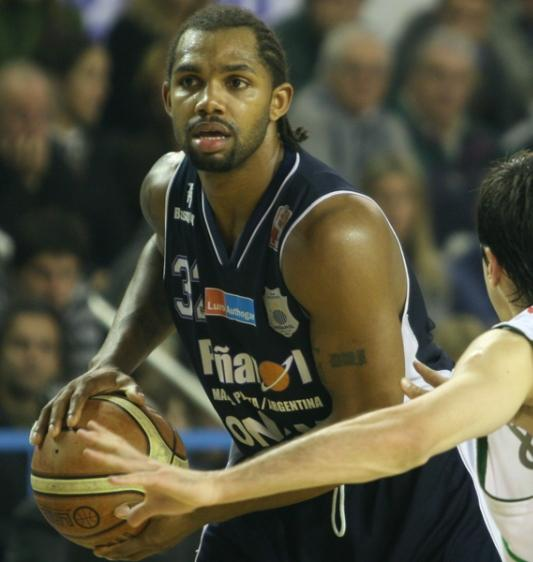
David Jackson (with the ball), 3× Argentine League Best Foreign Player (2009, 2010, 2011).

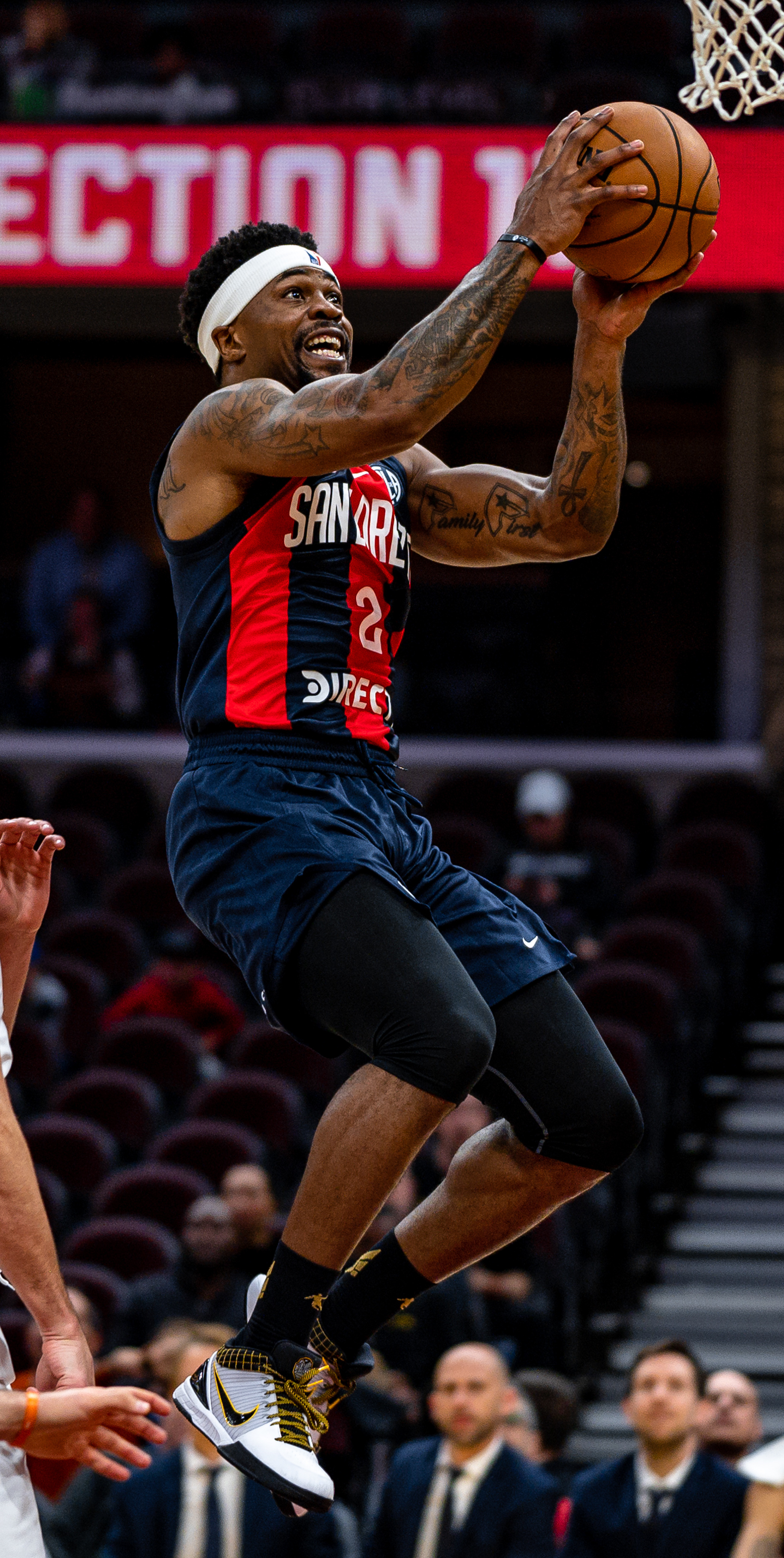
Dar Tucker, 2× Argentine League Best Foreign Player (2017, 2019).

- Player nationality by national team:

The Liga Nacional de Básquet (LNB) Best Foreign Player is an annual award that is given to the Argentine Basketball League's best player that was not born in Argentina. The award first began in the 1990–91 season.

Player (X)	Denotes the number of times the player has been selected.
Player (in bold)	Indicates a player that also won the LNB MVP award in the same season.

Season	Best Foreign Player	Club
1990–91	(United States) Clarence Hanley	Sport Club Cañadense
1991–92	(United States) Carey Scurry	Gimnasia y Esgrima y Pedernera Unidos
1992–93	(Uruguay) Horacio López	Ferro Carril Oeste
1993–94	(United States) Jervis Cole	Atenas de Córdoba
1994–95	(United States) Melvin Johnson	Independiente de General Pico
1995–96	(United States) Michael Wilson	Olimpia de Venado Tuerto
1996–97	(United States) Jerome Mincy	Boca Juniors
1997–98	(United States) Byron Wilson	Deportivo Roca
1998–99	(United States) Corey Allen	Pico Football Club
1999–00	(United States) J. J. Eubanks	Estudiantes de Olavarría
2000–01	(United States) Joe Bunn	Peñarol de Mar del Plata
2001–02	(Nigeria) Ben Ebong	Quilmes de Mar del Plata
2002–03	(Puerto Rico) Lazaro Borrell	Obras Sanitarias
2003–04	(United States) Josh Pittman	Atenas de Córdoba
2004–05	(United States) Sherell Ford	Peñarol de Mar del Plata
2005–06	(Panama) Antonio García	Estudiantes de Olavarría
2006–07	(United States) Jason Osborne	Peñarol de Mar del Plata
2007–08	(United States) Robert Battle	Libertad de Sunchales
2008–09	(United States) **David Jackson**	Peñarol de Mar del Plata
2009–10	(United States) David Jackson (2)	La Unión
2010–11	(United States) David Jackson (3)	La Unión
2011–12	(United States) Robert Battle (2)	Libertad de Sunchales
2012–13	(United States) John De Groat	Boca Juniors
2013–14	(United States) Walter Baxley	Quilmes de Mar del Plata
2014–15	(United States) Sam Clancy Jr.	Gimnasia Indalo
2015–16	(United States) Justin Williams	Ciclista Olímpico
2016–17	(Jordan) **Dar Tucker**	Estudiantes Concordia
2017–18	(United States) Donald Sims	Atenas
2018–19	(Jordan) Dar Tucker (2)	San Lorenzo
2019–20	Cancelled due to COVID-19 pandemic	
2020–21	(United States) Kelsey Barlow	Hispano Americano
2021–22	(United States) **Eric Anderson**	Quimsa
2022–23	(Cuba) **Yoanki Mencia**	Gimnasia y Esgrima
2023–24	(United States) **Brandon Robinson**	Quimsa
2024–25	(United States) **Chris Clarke**	Obras Sanitarias

=== Players with multiple Best Foreign Player awards ===
Player	Awards Won	Years won
(United States) David Jackson	3	(2009, 2010, 2011)
(United States) Robert Battle	2	(2008, 2012)
(Jordan) Dar Tucker	2	(2017, 2019)

== Most Improved Player ==
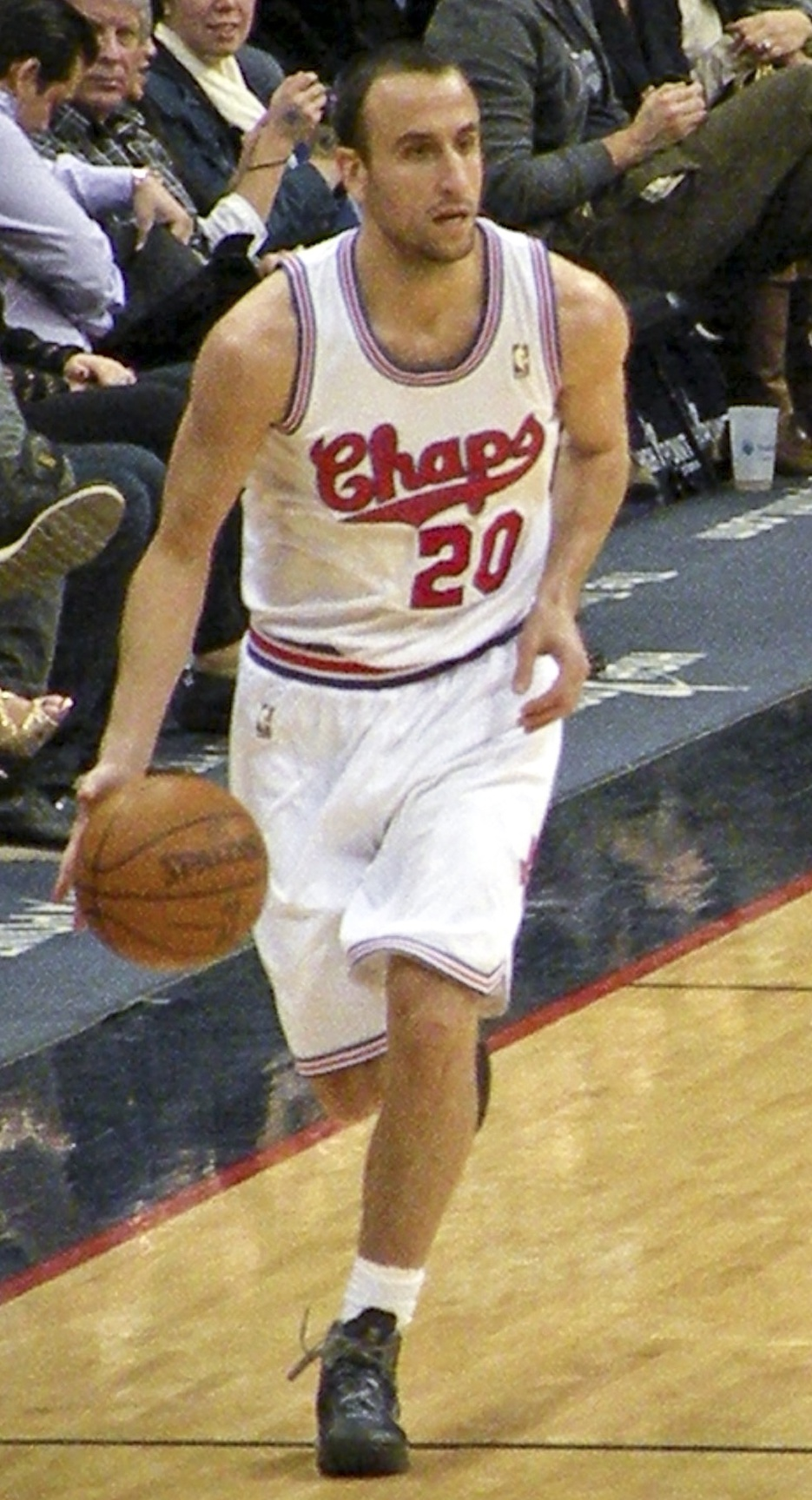
Manu Ginóbili, Argentine League Most Improved Player (1998).

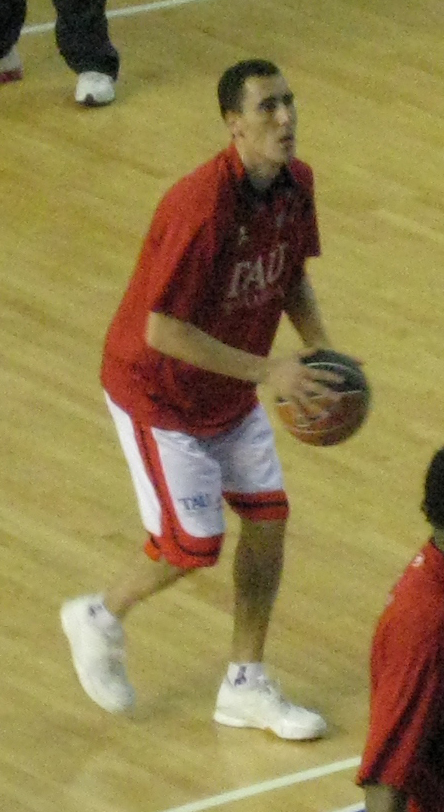
Pablo Prigioni, Argentine League Most Improved Player (1999).

- Player nationality by national team:

The Liga Nacional de Básquet (LNB) Most Improved Player (MIP) is an annual award that is given to the Most Improved Player of the regular season of the Argentine Basketball League. The award first began with the 1995–96 season.

Player (X)	Denotes the number of times the player has been selected.

Season	MIP	Club
1995–96	(Argentina) Marcos Nóbile	Atenas de Córdoba
1996–97	(Argentina) Mauricio Beltramella	Ferro Carril Oeste
1997–98	(Argentina) Manu Ginóbili	Estudiantes de Bahía Blanca
1998–99	(Argentina) Pablo Prigioni	Obras Sanitarias
1999–00	(Argentina) Mariano Ceruti	Libertad
2000–01	(Argentina) Federico Kammerichs	Ferro Carril Oeste
2001–02	(Argentina) Diego Prego	Libertad (2)
2002–03	(Argentina) Julio Mázzaro	Estudiantes de Olavarría
2003–04	(Argentina) Fernando Funes	Atenas de Córdoba
2004–05	(Argentina) Diego García	Ben Hur
2005–06	(Argentina) Pedro Calderón	Quilmes de Mar del Plata
2006–07	(Argentina) Mariano Byró	Sionista
2007–08	(Argentina) Marcos Saglietti	Libertad
2008–09	(Argentina) Juan Pablo Cantero	Sionista
2009–10	(Argentina) Leonel Schattmann	Unión de Sunchales
2010–11	(Argentina) Alexis Elsener	Obras Sanitarias
2011–12	(Argentina) Facu Campazzo	Peñarol de Mar del Plata
2012–13	(Argentina) Adrián Boccia	Lanús
2013–14	(Argentina) Fernando Martina	Regatas Corrientes
2014–15	(Argentina) Gabriel Deck	Quimsa
2015–16	(Argentina) Lucio Redivo	Bahía Basket
2016–17	(Argentina) Eric Flor	Quilmes
2017–18	(Argentina) Jonathan Maldonado	La Unión de Formosa
2018–19	(Argentina) Agustín Caffaro	Libertad
2019–20	Cancelled due to COVID-19 pandemic	
2020–21	(Argentina) Matías Solanas	San Martín
2021–22	(Argentina) Bruno Sansimoni	Peñarol
2022–23	(Argentina) Enzo Filippetti	Argentino
2023–24	(Argentina) Joaquín Valinotti	Peñarol
2024–25	(Argentina) Alex Negrete	Instituto

== Revelation of the Year ==
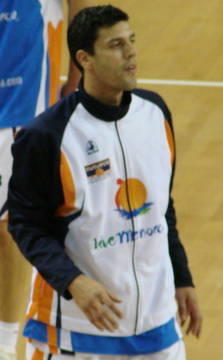
Dani Farabello, Argentine League Revelation of the Year (1993).

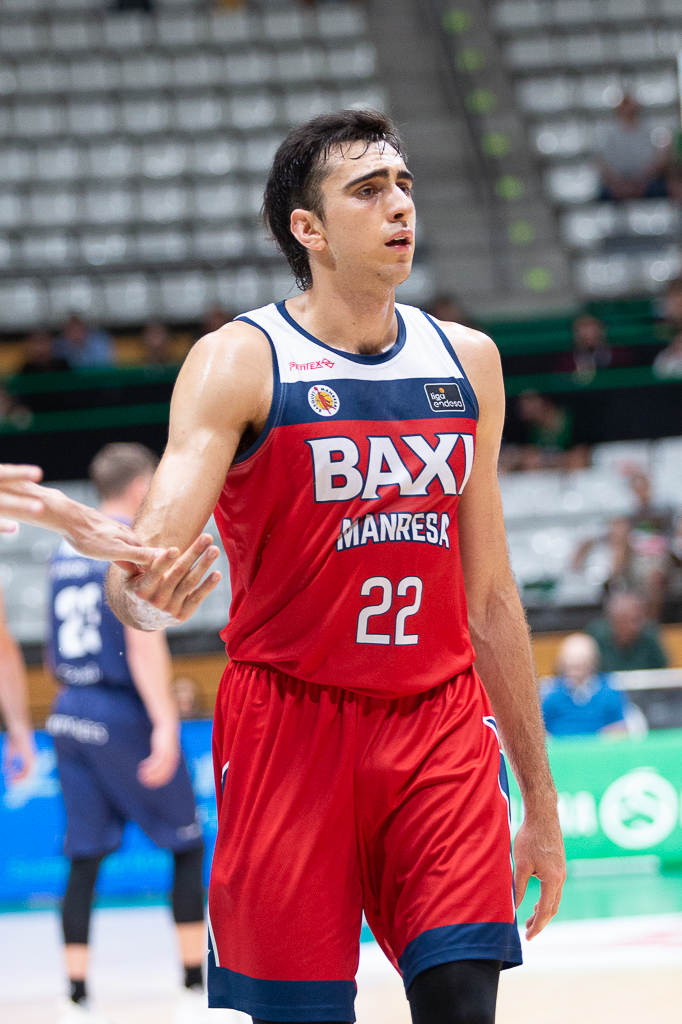
Juan Vaulet, Argentine League Revelation of the Year (2015).

- Player nationality by national team:

The Liga Nacional de Básquet (LNB) Revelation of the Year (ROY) is an annual award that is given to the Rookie of the Year of the regular season of the Argentine Basketball League. The award first began with the 1989 season.

Player (X)	Denotes the number of times the player has been selected.

Season	ROY	Club
1989	(Argentina) Juan Espil	Estudiantes de Bahía Blanca
1990	(Argentina) Alejandro Montecchia	Sport Club Cañadense
1990–91	(Argentina) Horacio Beigier	Boca Juniors
1991–92	(Argentina) Mauricio Hedman	Sport Club Cañadense
1992–93	(Argentina) Dani Farabello	Sport Club Cañadense
1993–94	(Argentina) Leopoldo Ruiz Moreno	Deportivo Roca
1994–95	(Argentina) Fabricio Oberto	Atenas
1995–96	(Argentina) Manu Ginóbili	Andino Sport Club
1996–97	(Argentina) Luciano Masieri	Obras Sanitarias
1997–98	(Argentina) Pablo Albertinazzi	Deportivo Roca
1998–99	(Argentina) Walter Herrmann	Olimpia de Venado Tuerto
1999–00	(Argentina) Mauricio Pedemonte	Obras Sanitarias
2000–01	(Argentina) Paolo Quinteros	Estudiantes de Olavarría
2001–02	(Argentina) Javier Bulfoni	Gimnasia y Esgrima (La Plata)
2002–03	(Argentina) J. P. Gutiérrez	Obras Sanitarias
2003–04	(Argentina) Juan Pablo Figueroa	Atenas
2004–05	(Argentina) Facundo Venturini	Gimnasia y Esgrima (La Plata)
2005–06	(Argentina) Agustín Carabajal	Ciclista Juninense
2006–07	(Argentina) Alejandro Zilli	Centro Juventud Sionista
2007–08	(Argentina) Federico Ferrini	Monte Hermoso
2008–09	(Argentina) Germán Sciutto	Gimnasia y Esgrima (Comodoro Rivadavia)
2009–10	(Argentina) Facu Campazzo	Peñarol de Mar del Plata
2010–11	(Argentina) Miguel Gerlero	Atenas
2011–12	(Argentina) Alejandro Konsztadt	Obras Sanitarias
2012–13	(Argentina) Federico Van Lacke	Boca Juniors
2013–14	(Argentina) Matías Bortolín	Regatas Corrientes
2014–15	(Argentina) Juan Vaulet	Weber Bahía
2015–16	(Argentina) Pablo Bertone	Lanús
2016–17	(Argentina) Mateo Chiarini	Atenas
2017–18	(Argentina) Fernando Zurbriggen	Obras Sanitarias
2018–19	(Argentina) Victor Fernandez	Quilmes
2019–20	Cancelled due to COVID-19 pandemic	
2020–21	(Argentina) Franco Pennacchiotti	Peñarol
2021–22	(Argentina) Andrés Jaime	Unión
2022–23	(Argentina) Salvador Giletto	Independiente
2023–24	(Argentina) Lucas Andújar	Zárate
2024–25	(Argentina) Jano Martínez	Ferro Carril Oeste

== Sixth Man of the Year ==
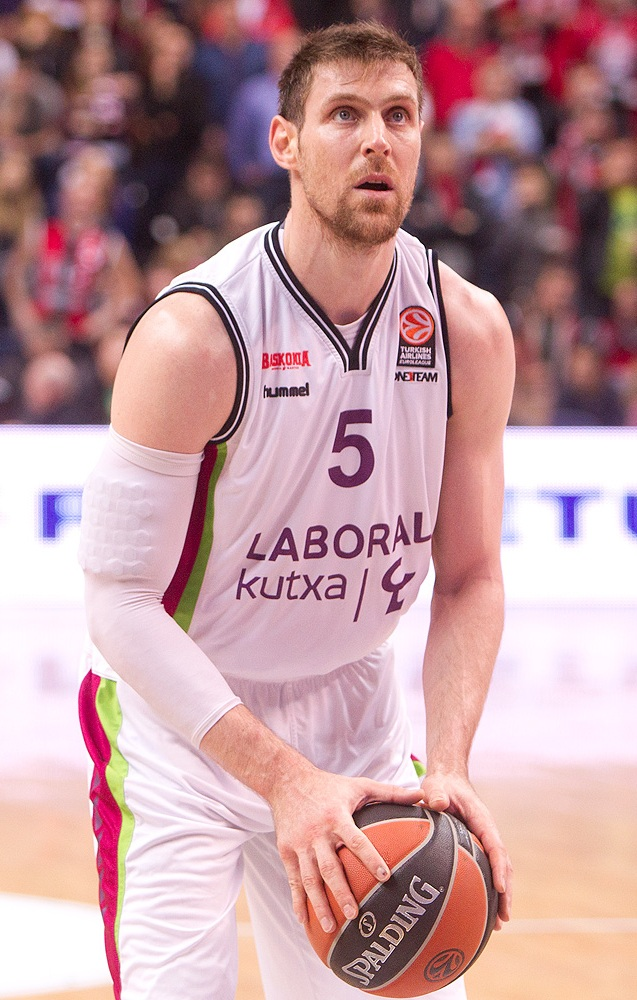
Andrés Nocioni, Argentine League Co-Sixth Man of the Year (1999).

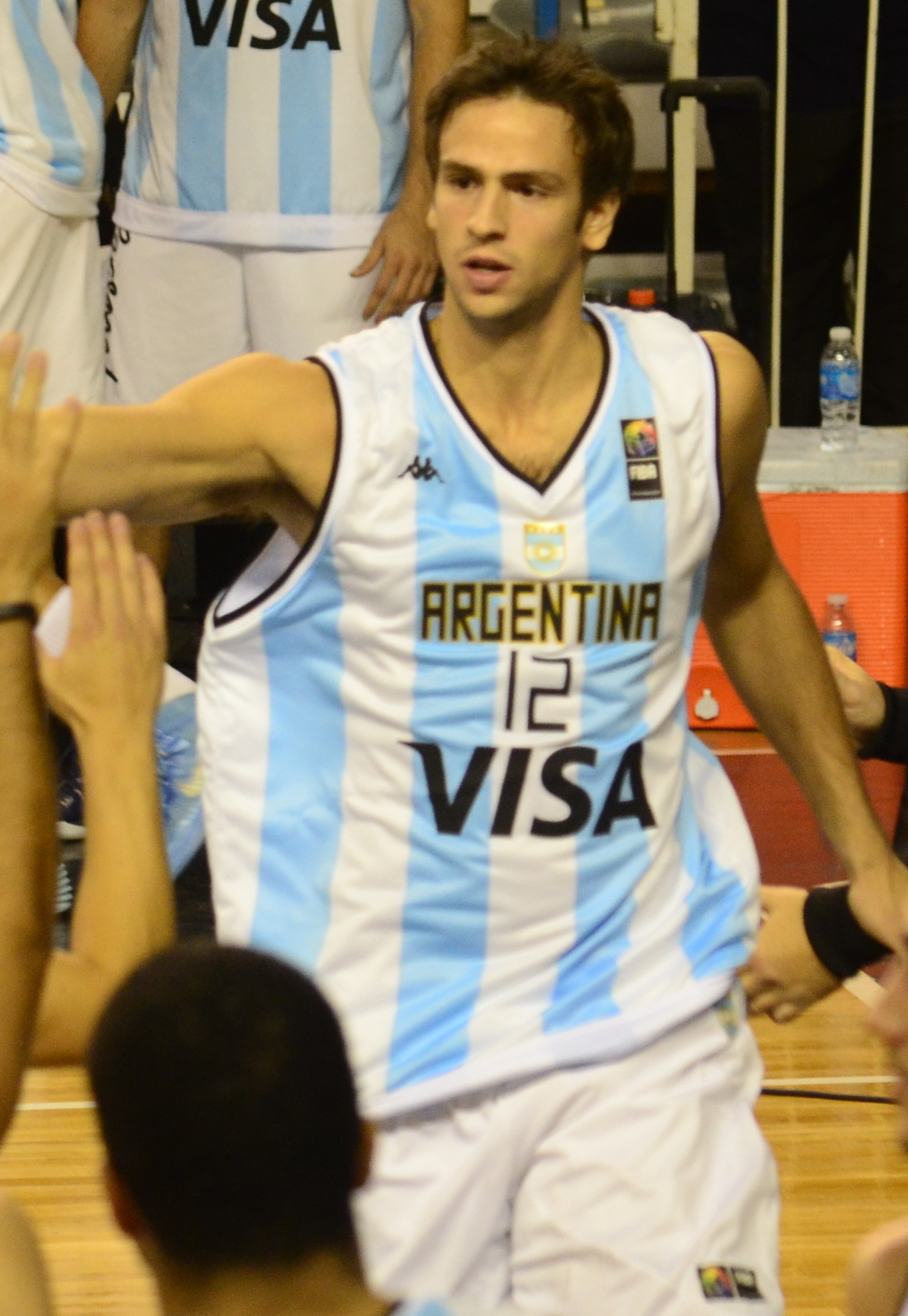
Marcos Delía (#12), Argentine League Sixth Man of the Year (2014).

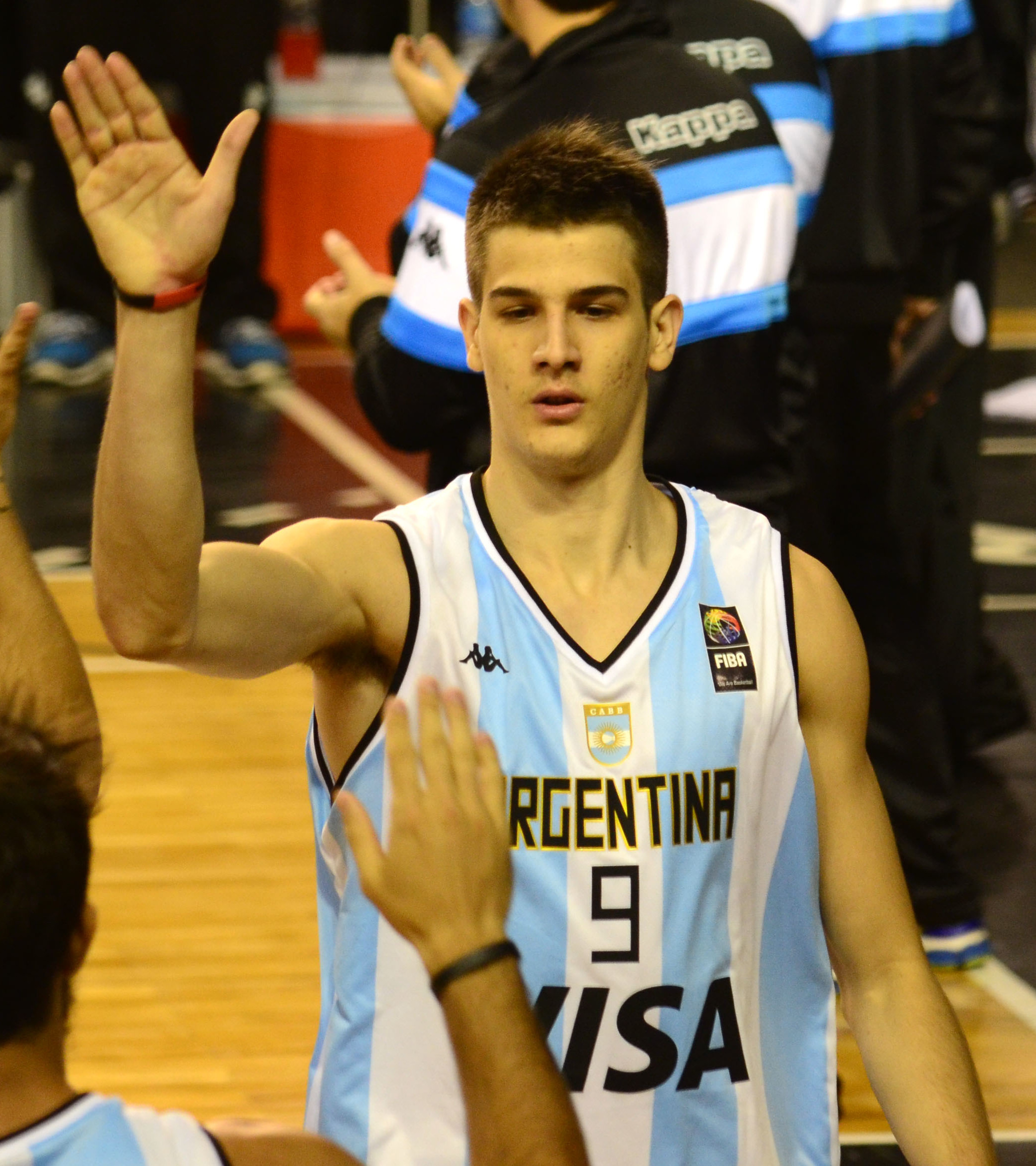
Nico Brussino (#9), Argentine League Co-Sixth Man of the Year (2015).

- Player nationality by national team:

The Liga Nacional de Básquet (LNB) Sixth Man of the Year is an annual award that is given to the best 6th man of the regular season of the Argentine Basketball League. The award first began with the 1990–91 season.

Player (X)	Denotes the number of times the player has been selected.

Season	6th Man of the Year	Club
1990–91	(United States) Edgard Merchant	Gimnasia y Esgrima y Pedernera Unidos
1991–92	(Argentina) Germán Filloy	Atenas de Córdoba
1992–93	(Argentina) Eduardo Dominé	Quilmes de Mar del Plata
1993–94	(Argentina) Ernesto Michel	Atenas de Córdoba
1994–95	(Argentina) Jorge Racca	Olimpia de Venado Tuerto
1995–96	(Argentina) Leopoldo Ruíz Moreno	Atenas de Córdoba
1996–97	(Argentina) Fabricio Oberto	Atenas de Córdoba
1997–98	(Argentina) Leandro Palladino	Atenas de Córdoba
1998–99	(Argentina) Andrés Nocioni	Independiente de General Pico
1998–99	(Argentina) Leandro Palladino (2)	Atenas de Córdoba
1999–00	(Argentina) Leandro Palladino (3)	Atenas de Córdoba
2000–01	(Argentina) Víctor Baldo	Estudiantes de Olavarría
2001–02	(Argentina) Pablo Gil	Quilmes de Mar del Plata
2002–03	(Argentina) Diego Prego	Boca Juniors
2003–04	(Argentina) Matías Sandes	Boca Juniors
2004–05	(Argentina) Matías Sandes (2)	Boca Juniors
2005–06	(Argentina) Walter Storani	Club Sportivo Ben Hur
2006–07	(Argentina) Luis Cequeira	Boca Juniors
2007–08	(Argentina) Marcos Saglietti	Libertad de Sunchales
2008–09	(Argentina) Juan Pablo Figueroa	Atenas de Córdoba
2009–10	(Argentina) Juan Pablo Cantero	Atenas de Córdoba
2010–11	(Argentina) Juan Espil	Estudiantes de Bahía Blanca
2011–12	(United States) Tyler Field	Obras Sanitarias
2012–13	(Argentina) Nicolás Romano	Club de Regatas Corrientes
2013–14	(Argentina) Marcos Delía	Boca Juniors
2014–15	(Argentina) Santiago Scala	Gimnasia Indalo
2014–15	(Argentina) Nicolás Brussino	Regatas Corrientes
2015–16	(Argentina) Mauro Cosolito	Ciclista Olímpico
2016–17	(Argentina) José Vildoza	Libertad
2017–18	(United States) Justin Keenan	San Martín (C)
2018–19	(Argentina) Luciano González	Instituto
2019–20	Cancelled due to COVID-19 pandemic	
2020–21	(Argentina) Manuel Buendía	Boca Juniors
2021–22	(Argentina) Joaquín Valinotti	Peñarol
2022–23	(Argentina) Víctor Fernández	Platense
2023–24	(Argentina) Bautista Lugarini	Instituto
2024–25	(Argentina) Juan Pablo Corbalán	Riachuelo

=== Players with multiple Best Sixth Man awards ===
Player	Awards Won	Years won
(Argentina) Leandro Palladino	3	(1998, 1999, 2000)
(Argentina) Matías Sandes	2	(2004, 2005)

== Ideal Quintet ==
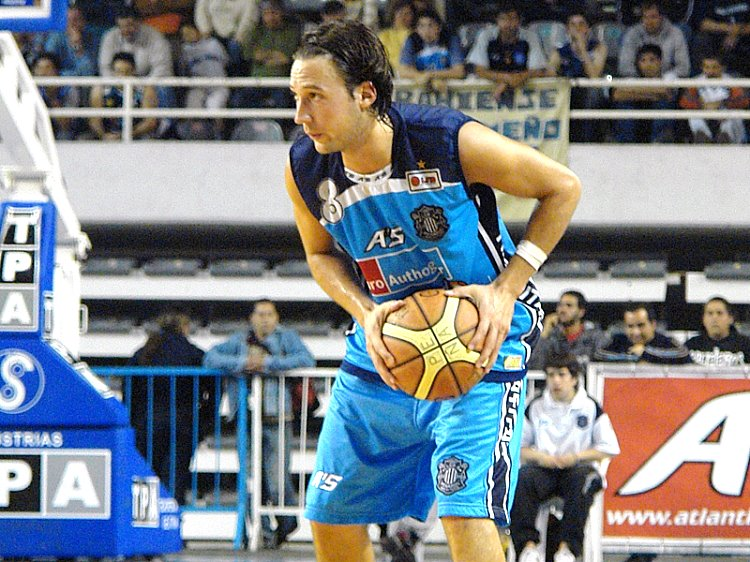
Tato Rodríguez, 3× Argentine League Ideal Quintet (2005, 2007, 2010).

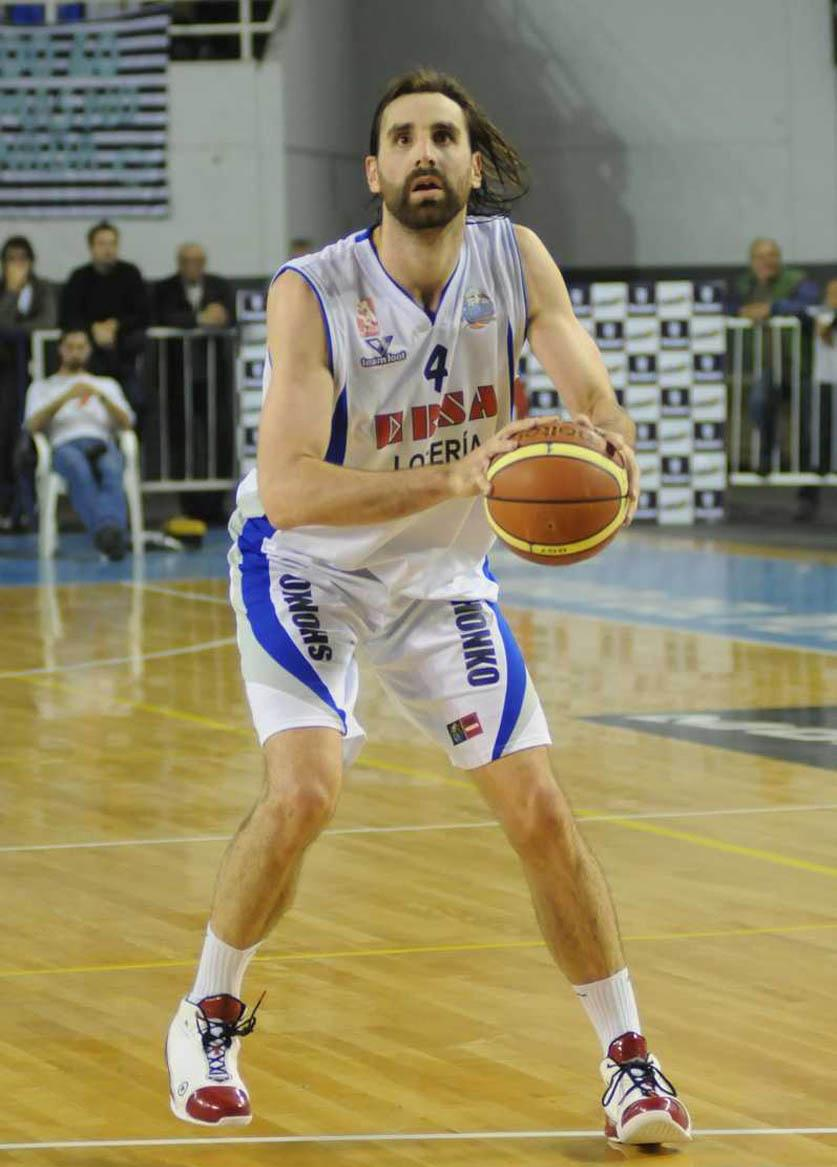
Federico Kammerichs, 2× Argentine League Ideal Quintet (2009, 2011).

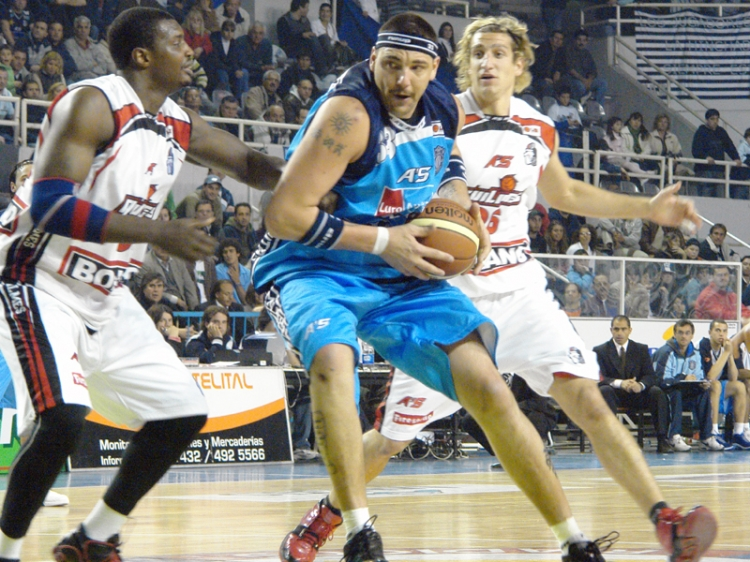
Román González (with the ball), 2× Argentine League Ideal Quintet (2009, 2010).

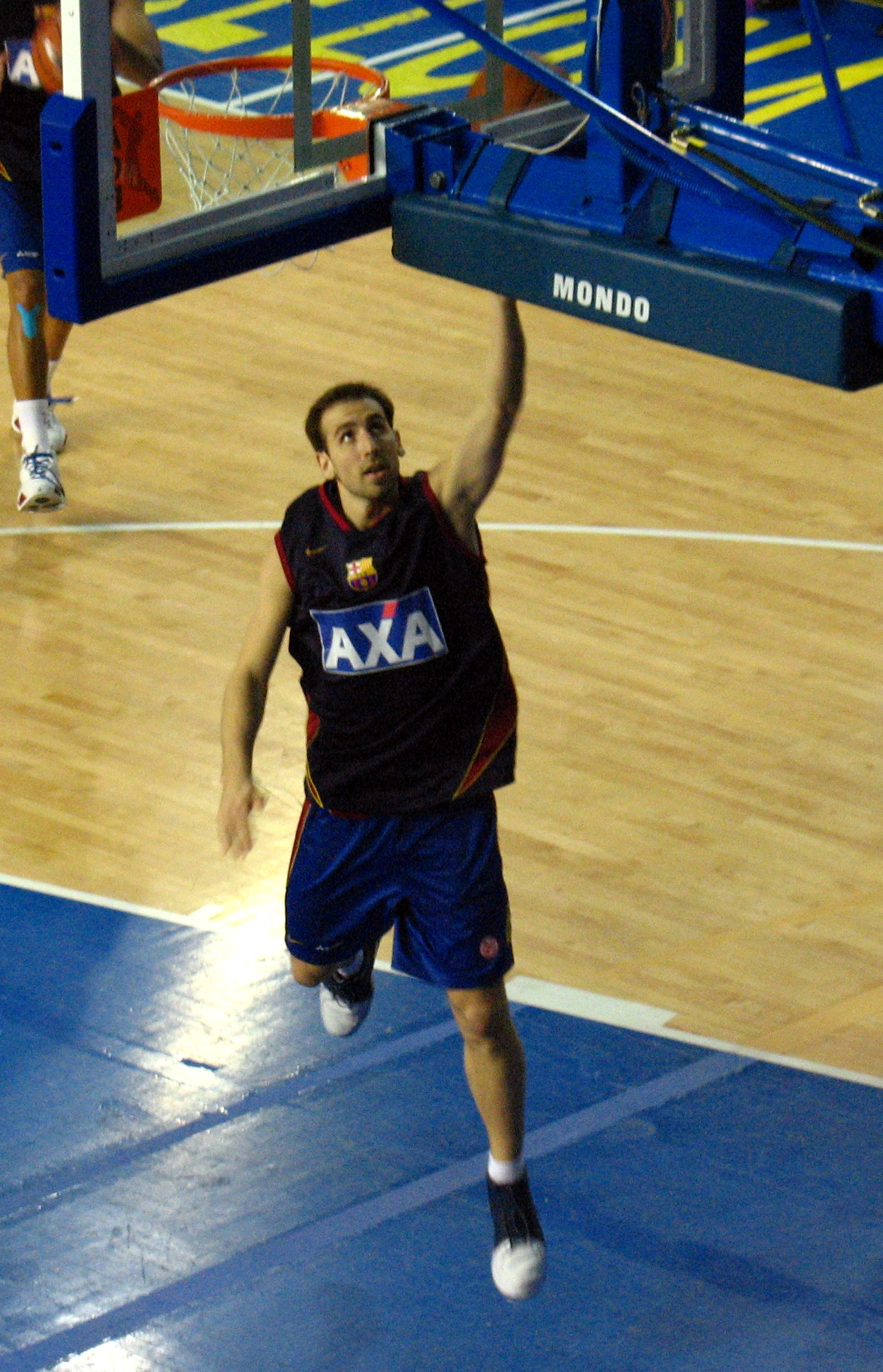
Pepe Sánchez, Argentine League Ideal Quintet (2011).

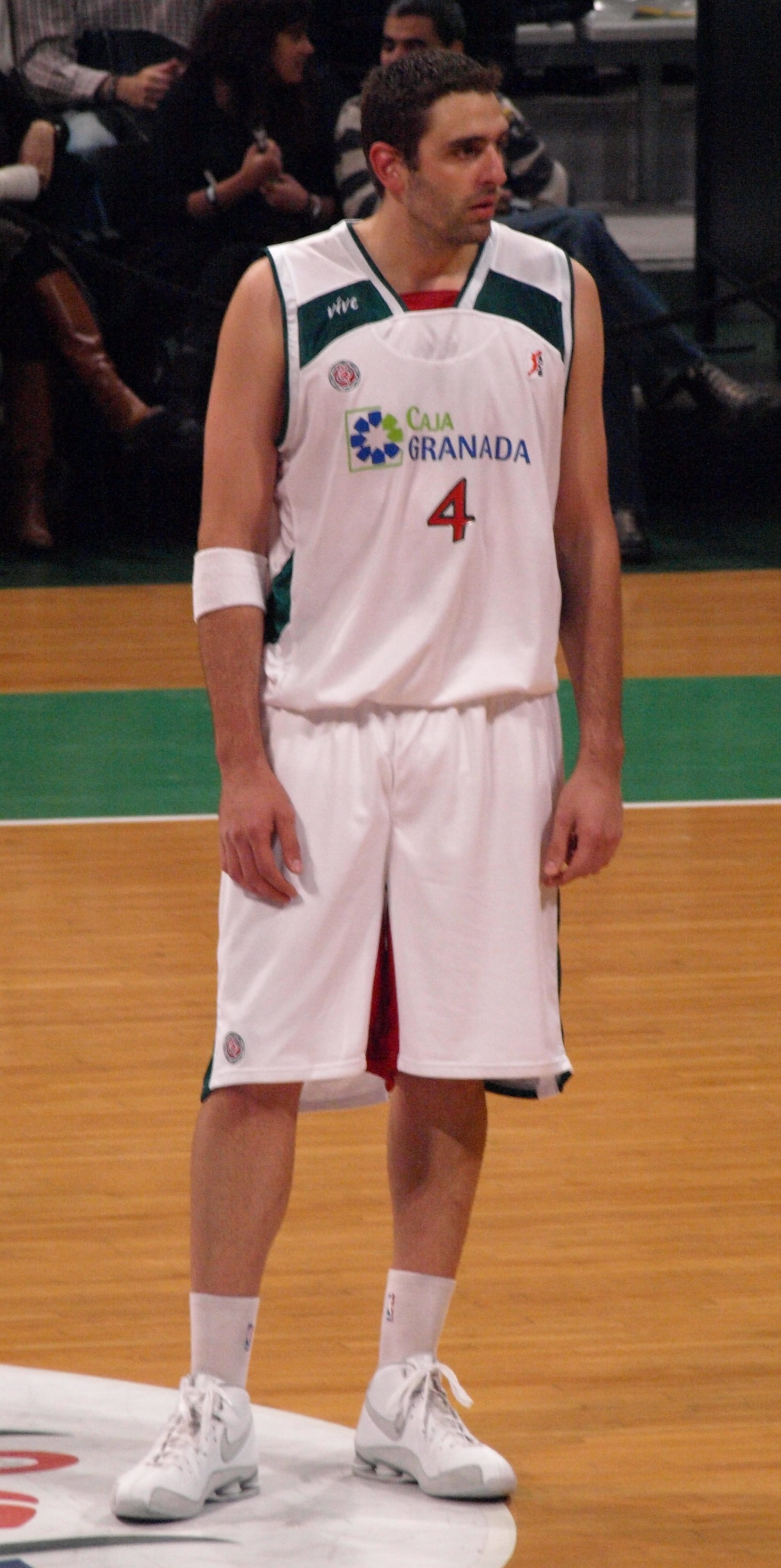
J. P. Gutiérrez, 2× Argentine League Ideal Quintet (2011, 2012).

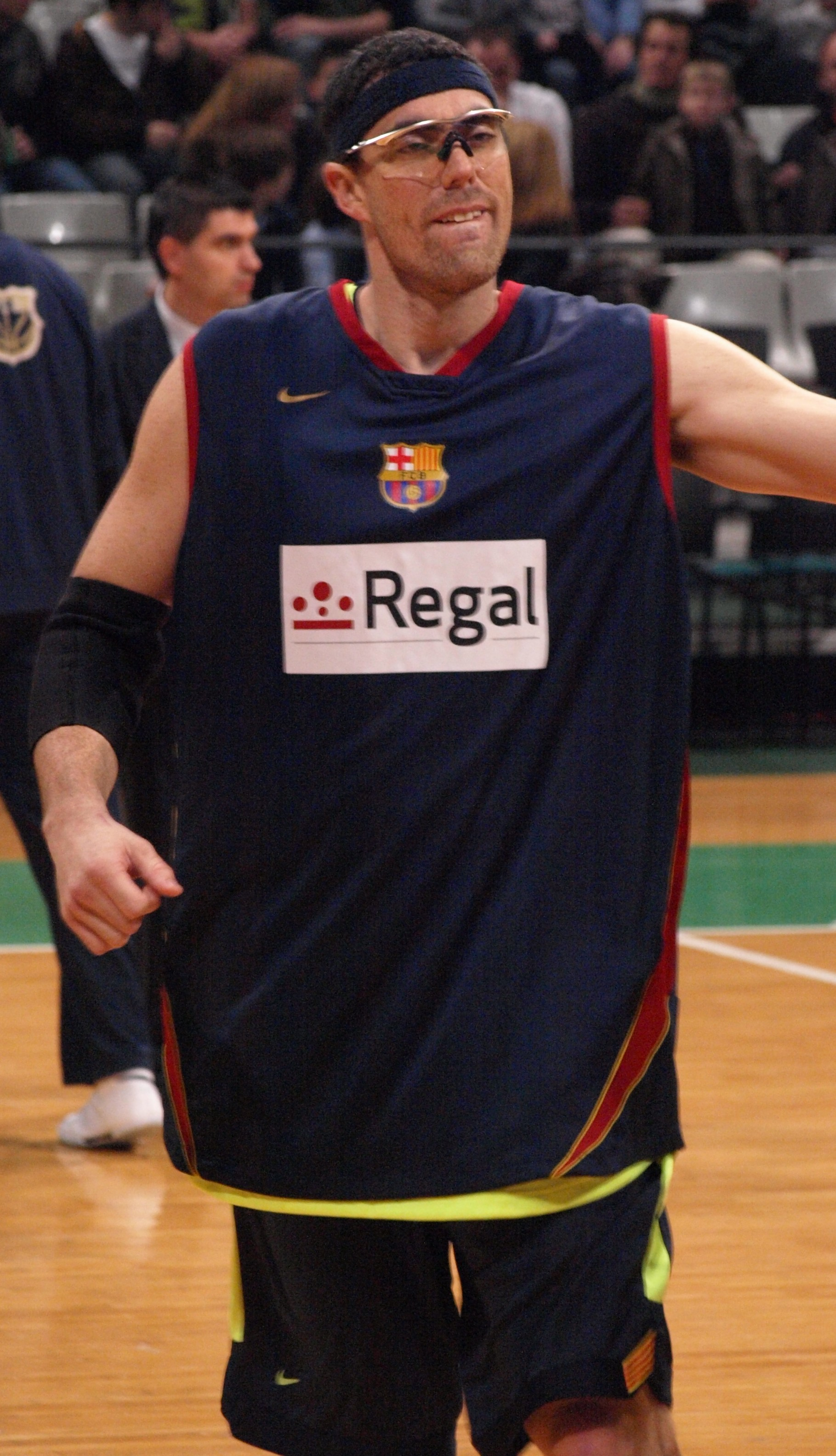
Daniel Santiago, Argentine League Ideal Quintet (2013).

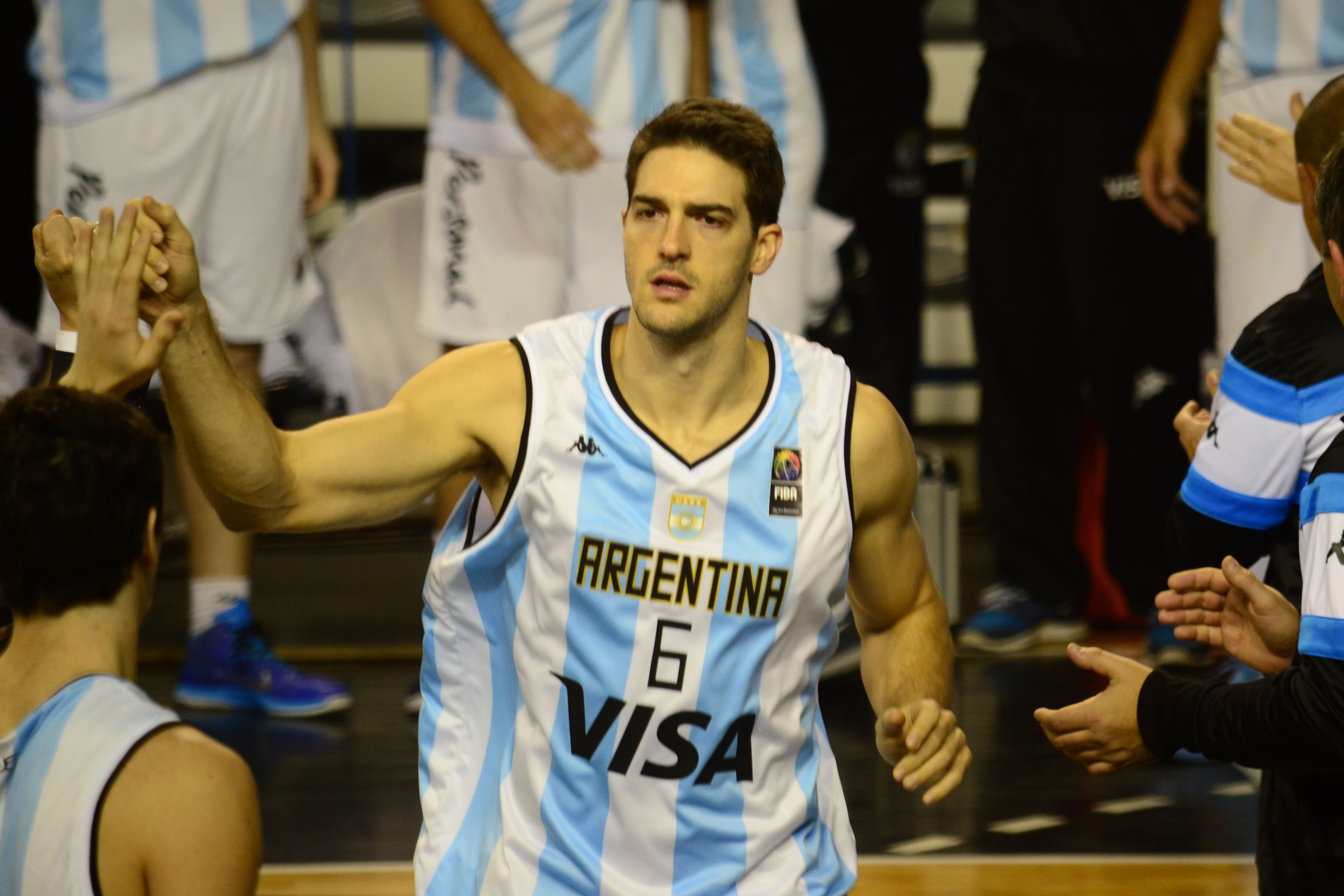
Marcos Mata (#6), 4× Argentine League Ideal Quintet (2013, 2017, 2018, 2019).

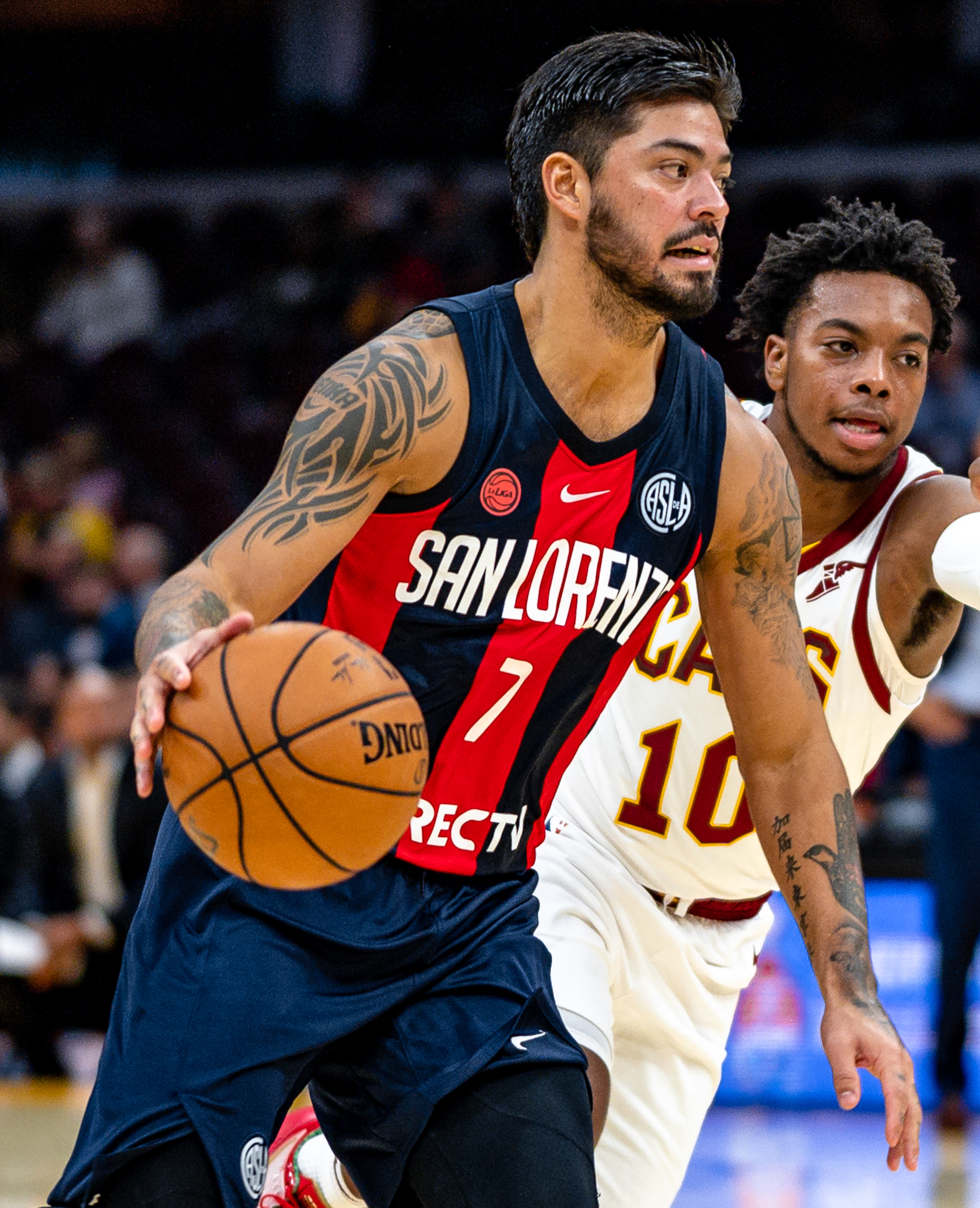
Nicolás Aguirre (with the ball), Argentine League Ideal Quintet (2015).

- Player nationality by national team:

The Liga Nacional de Básquet (LNB) Ideal Quintet is the Argentine Basketball League's annual award for the five best players of each season. The Ideal Quintet consists of one player per position: point guard, shooting guard, small forward, power forward, and center. The award first began with the 2004–05 season.

Player (X)	Denotes the number of times the player has been selected.
Player (in bold)	Indicates a player that also won the LNB MVP award in the same season.

Season
Season	Ideal Team	
Season	Player	Club
2004–05	(Argentina) Tato Rodríguez	Peñarol
2004–05	(Argentina) Paolo Quinteros	Boca Juniors
2004–05	(Argentina) Matías Sandes	Boca Juniors
2004–05	(Argentina) **Leo Gutiérrez**	Ben Hur
2004–05	(United States) Chuckie Robinson	Argentino de Junín
2005–06	(Argentina) Sebastián Ginóbili	Libertad
2005–06	(Argentina) Paolo Quinteros (2)	Boca Juniors
2005–06	(United States) Ramzee Stanton	Ben Hur
2005–06	(Argentina) **Leo Gutiérrez** (2)	Ben Hur
2005–06	(Panama) Antonio García	Estudiantes de Olavarría
2006–07	(Argentina) Tato Rodríguez (2)	Peñarol
2006–07	(Argentina) Diego García	Regatas Corrientes
2006–07	(United States) Josh Pittman	Peñarol
2006–07	(United States) Jason Osborne	Peñarol
2006–07	(Argentina) **Gabriel Mikulas**	Peñarol
2007–08	(Argentina) Javier Martínez	Regatas Corrientes
2007–08	(Argentina) Sebastián Acosta	Atenas
2007–08	(United States) Cleotis Brown	Quimsa
2007–08	(Argentina) **Leo Gutiérrez** (3)	Boca Juniors
2007–08	(United States) Robert Battle	Libertad
2008–09	(Argentina) Juan Pablo Cantero	Sionista
2008–09	(United States) **David Jackson**	Peñarol
2008–09	(Argentina) Juan Manuel Locatelli	Atenas
2008–09	(Argentina) Federico Kammerichs	Regatas Corrientes
2008–09	(Argentina) Román González	Peñarol
2009–10	(Argentina) Tato Rodríguez (3)	Peñarol
2009–10	(United States) David Jackson (2)	La Unión de Formosa
2009–10	(Argentina) Juan Manuel Locatelli (2)	Atenas
2009–10	(Argentina) **Leo Gutiérrez** (4)	Peñarol
2009–10	(Argentina) Román González (2)	Quimsa
2010–11	(Argentina) Pepe Sánchez	Estudiantes de Bahía Blanca
2010–11	(United States) David Jackson (3)	La Unión de Formosa
2010–11	(Puerto Rico) Alex Galindo	Libertad
2010–11	(Argentina) Federico Kammerichs (2)	Regatas
2010–11	(Argentina) **J. P. Gutiérrez**	Obras Sanitarias
2011–12	(Argentina) Facu Campazzo	Peñarol
2011–12	(United States) Joe Troy Smith	La Unión de Formosa
2011–12	(Argentina) Dartona Washam	Obras Sanitarias
2011–12	(Argentina) Leo Gutiérrez (5)	Peñarol
2011–12	(Argentina) **J. P. Gutiérrez** (2)	Obras Sanitarias
2012–13	(Argentina) Facu Campazzo (2)	Peñarol
2012–13	(Argentina) **Paolo Quinteros** (3)	Regatas Corrientes
2012–13	(Argentina) Marcos Mata	Peñarol
2012–13	(United States) John De Groat	Boca Juniors
2012–13	(Puerto Rico) Daniel Santiago	Boca Juniors
2013–14	(Argentina) Facu Campazzo (3)	Peñarol
2013–14	(Argentina) Paolo Quinteros (4)	Regatas Corrientes
2013–14	(Argentina) **Walter Herrmann**	Atenas
2013–14	(Argentina) Leo Gutiérrez (6)	Peñarol
2013–14	(United States) Sam Clancy, Jr.	Gimnasia Indalo
2014–15	(Argentina) **Nicolás Aguirre**	Quimsa
2014–15	(United States) Walter Baxley	Quilmes
2014–15	(Argentina) Federico Aguerre	Gimnasia Indalo
2014–15	(United States) Jeremiah Wood	San Martín de Corrientes
2014–15	(United States) Sam Clancy, Jr. (2)	Gimnasia Indalo
2015–16	(Argentina) Maxi Stanic	Ciclista Olímpico
2015–16	(United States) Walter Baxley (2)	Quilmes
2015–16	(Argentina) Federico Aguerre (2)	Gimnasia Indalo
2015–16	(Argentina) Walter Herrmann (2)	San Lorenzo (BA)
2015–16	(United States) **Justin Williams**	Ciclista Olímpico
2016–17	(Argentina) Franco Balbi	Ferro (BA)
2016–17	(Jordan) **Dar Tucker**	Estudiantes Concordia
2016–17	(Argentina) Marcos Mata (2)	San Lorenzo (BA)
2016–17	(Argentina) Gabriel Deck	San Lorenzo (BA)
2016–17	(Cuba) Javier Justiz	Estudiantes Concordia
2017–18	(United States) Donald Sims	Atenas
2017–18	(United States) Dwayne Davis	Instituto
2017–18	(Argentina) Marcos Mata (3)	San Lorenzo (BA)
2017–18	(Argentina) **Gabriel Deck** (2)	San Lorenzo (BA)
2017–18	(United States) Jerome Meyinsse	Atenas
2018–19	(Argentina) Pedro Barral	Obras Sanitarias
2018–19	(Jordan) Dar Tucker (2)	San Lorenzo (BA)
2018–19	(Argentina) **Marcos Mata** (4)	San Lorenzo (BA)
2018–19	(Cuba) Jasiel Rivero	Boca Juniors
2018–19	(Dominican Republic) Eloy Vargas	Gimnasia (CR)
2019–20	Cancelled due to COVID-19 pandemic	
2020–21	(Argentina) **Fernando Zurbriggen**	Obras Sanitarias
2020–21	(United States) Brandon Robinson	Quimsa
2020–21	(United States) Kelsey Barlow	Hispano Americano
2020–21	(Argentina) Mariano Fierro	Comunicaciones
2020–21	(Argentina) Tayavek Gallizzi	Regatas
2021–22	(Argentina) Franco Baralle	Quimsa
2021–22	(United States) Melvin Johnson	Oberá
2021–22	(Argentina) Sebastián Vega	Gimnasia y Esgrima
2021–22	(Argentina) Nicolás Romano	Instituto
2021–22	(United States) **Eric Anderson**	Quimsa
2022–23	(Argentina) Franco Balbi (2)	Boca Juniors
2022–23	(Argentina) Leonel Schattmann	Boca Juniors
2022–23	(United States) Thomas Cooper	La Unión
2022–23	(Cuba) **Yoanki Mencia**	Gimnasia y Esgrima
2022–23	(Argentina) Tayavek Gallizzi (2)	Instituto
2023–24	(Argentina) José Vildoza	Boca Juniors
2023–24	(United States) **Brandon Robinson** (2)	Quimsa
2023–24	(United States) Andre Spight	Obras Sanitarias
2023–24	(Argentina) Fabián Ramírez Barrios	Quimsa
2023–24	(Argentina) Tayavek Gallizzi (3)	Quimsa
2024–25	(Argentina) **José Vildoza** (2)	Boca Juniors
2024–25	(Argentina) Agustín Brocal	Oberá
2024–25	(United States) Chris Clarke	Obras Sanitarias
2024–25	(Argentina) Agustín Barreiro	Oberá
2024–25	(United States) Al Thornton	Peñarol

=== Players with multiple Ideal Quintet selections ===
Player	Number of Selections	Years Selected
(Argentina) Leo Gutiérrez	6	(2005, 2006, 2008, 2010, 2012, 2014)
(Argentina) Paolo Quinteros	4	(2005, 2006, 2013, 2014)
(Argentina) Marcos Mata	4	(2013, 2017, 2018, 2019)
(Argentina) Tato Rodríguez	3	(2005, 2007, 2010)
(United States) David Jackson	3	(2009, 2010, 2011)
(Argentina) Facu Campazzo	3	(2012, 2013, 2014)
(Argentina) Tayavek Gallizzi	3	(2021, 2023, 2024)
(Argentina) Juan Manuel Locatelli	2	(2009, 2010)
(Argentina) Román González	2	(2009, 2010)
(Argentina) Federico Kammerichs	2	(2009, 2011)
(Argentina) J. P. Gutiérrez	2	(2011, 2012)
(United States) Sam Clancy, Jr.	2	(2014, 2015)
(Argentina) Walter Herrmann	2	(2014, 2016)
(United States) Walter Baxley	2	(2015, 2016)
(Argentina) Federico Aguerre	2	(2015, 2016)
(Argentina) Gabriel Deck	2	(2017, 2018)
(Jordan) Dar Tucker	2	(2017, 2019)
(Argentina) Franco Balbi	2	(2017, 2023)
(United States) Brandon Robinson	2	(2021, 2024)
(Argentina) José Vildoza	2	(2024, 2025)

== Coach of the Year ==
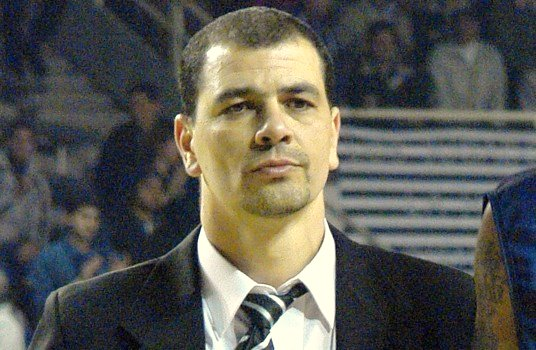
Sergio Hernández, 4× Argentine League Coach of the Year (1993, 2001, 2002, 2010).

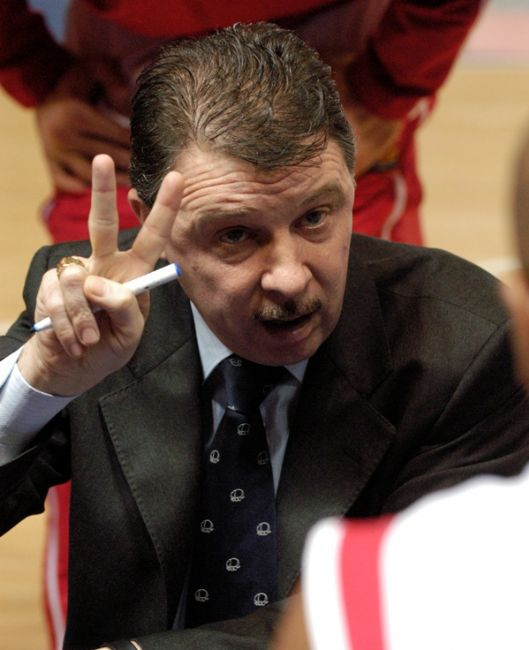
Rubén Magnano, Argentine League Coach of the Year (2000).

The Liga Nacional de Básquet (LNB) Coach of the Year (COY) is an annual award that is given to the best head coach of the regular season of the Argentine Basketball League. The award first began with the 1989 season.

Head coach (X)	Denotes the number of times the head coach has been selected.
Club (in bold)	Indicates a head coach that also won the league championship in the same season.

Season	COY	Club	Win/Loss Record
1989	(Argentina) León Najnudel	**Club Ferro Carril Oeste**	22–6
1990	(Uruguay) Miguel Volcán Sánchez	Atlético Echagüe Club	17–9
1990–91	(Argentina) Julio Lamas	Sport Club Cañadense	24–14
1991–92	(Argentina) Oscar Sánchez	Quilmes de Mar del Plata	
1992–93	(Argentina) Sergio Hernández	Sport Club Cañadense	24–20
1993–94	(Argentina) Mario Guzmán	Independiente de General Pico	
1994–95	(Argentina) Mario Guzmán (2) (Argentina) Pablo Coleffi	**Independiente de General Pico**; Atenas de Córdoba	
1995–96	(Argentina) Horacio Seguí	**Olimpia de Venado Tuerto**	
1996–97	(Argentina) Julio Lamas (2)	**Boca Juniors**	32–12
1997–98	(Argentina) Daniel Rodríguez	Estudiantes de Bahía Blanca	
1998–99	(Argentina) Enrique Tolcachier	Club Ferro Carril Oeste	
1999–00	(Argentina) Rubén Magnano	Boca Juniors	
2000–01	(Argentina) Sergio Hernández (2)	**Estudiantes de Olavarría**	35–9
2001–02	(Argentina) Sergio Hernández (3)	**Estudiantes de Olavarría**	33–11
2002–03	(Argentina) Carlos Bualó	Pico	24–12
2003–04	(Argentina) Gonzalo García	Gimnasia y Esgrima (La Plata)	
2004–05	(Argentina) Julio Lamas (3)	**Club Sportivo Ben Hur**	36–8
2005–06	(Argentina) Julio Lamas (4)	Club Sportivo Ben Hur	31–12
2006–07	(Argentina) Julio Lamas (5)	Club Sportivo Ben Hur	23–21
2007–08	(Argentina) Julio Lamas (6)	**Libertad de Sunchales**	42–13
2008–09	(Argentina) Nicolás Casalánguida	Gimnasia y Esgrima (Comodoro Rivadavia)	26–22
2009–10	(Argentina) Sergio Hernández (4)	**Peñarol de Mar del Plata**	43–12
2010–11	(Argentina) Julio Lamas (7)	Obras Sanitarias	34–14
2011–12	(Argentina) Silvio Santander	Lanús	28–21
2012–13	(Argentina) Adrián Capelli	Argentino de Junín	28–24
2013–14	(Argentina) Nicolás Casalánguida (2)	Club de Regatas Corrientes	45–12
2014–15	(Argentina) Silvio Santander (2)	**Asociación Atlética Quimsa**	56–13
2015–16	(Argentina) Fernando Duró	Club Ciclista Olímpico	36–20
2016–17	(Argentina) Hernán Langinestra	Estudiantes Concordia	39–21
2017–18	(Argentina) Sebastián González	Club San Martín de Corrientes	40–17
2018–19	(Argentina) Gonzalo García (2)	San Lorenzo	32–6
2019–20	Cancelled due to COVID-19 pandemic		
2020–21	(Argentina) Sebastián González (2)	Quimsa	31–7
2021–22	(Argentina) Sebastián González (3) (Argentina) Leandro Ramella	Quimsa; Peñarol	30–8 25–13
2022–23	(Argentina) Lucas Victoriano	Instituto	31–7
2023–24	(Argentina) Leandro Ramella (2)	Quimsa	32–6
2024–25	(Argentina) Fabio Demti	Oberá	26–12

=== Head coaches with multiple Coach of the Year awards ===
Player	Awards Won	Years won
(Argentina) Julio Lamas	7	(1991, 1997, 2005, 2006, 2007, 2008, 2011)
(Argentina) Sergio Hernández	4	(1993, 2001, 2002, 2010)
(Argentina) Sebastián González	3	(2018, 2021, 2022)
(Argentina) Mario Guzmán	2	(1994, 1995)
(Argentina) Nicolás Casalánguida	2	(2009, 2014)
(Argentina) Silvio Santander	2	(2012, 2015)
(Argentina) Gonzalo García	2	(2004, 2019)
(Argentina) Leandro Ramella	2	(2022, 2024)

== Bibliography ==
- Liga Nacional de Básquetbol Guía Oficial 2015/2016, p. 184 (awards) and p. 211 (leaders).
