= 2012–13 Liga Nacional de Básquet season =

- League: Liga Nacional de Básquet
- Sport: Basketball
- Duration: 14 September 2012 – 10 March 2013 (regular season); 13 March – 15 May 2013 (playoffs)
- Number of teams: 16
- TV partner(s): TyC Sports
- Season MVP: (Argentina) Paolo Quinteros
- Top scorer: (United States) Darren Phillip

2013 Liga Nacional de Básquet Playoffs
- Finals champions: Regatas Corrientes
- Runners-up: Lanús
- Finals MVP: (Argentina) Paolo Quinteros (Regatas Corrientes)

Liga Nacional de Básquet seasons
- ← 2011–12 2013–14 →

The 2012–13 Liga Nacional de Básquet season was the 29th season of the top professional basketball league in Argentina. The regular season started on 14 September 2012. Regatas Corrientes won their first title, defeating Lanús in the finals.

== Promotions and relegations ==
Torneo Nacional de Ascenso Champions from the previous season Unión Progresista and runners-up Argentino de Junín were promoted, occupying the berths left by Quilmes and San Martín de Corrientes. Unión Progresista would be relegated at the end of the season, together with 9 de Julio de Río Tercero.

== Clubs ==
Team	City	Arena	Capacity
Argentino de Junín	Junín	El Fortín de las Morochas	1,465
Atenas	Córdoba	Carlos Cerutti	3,730
Bahía Basket	Bahía Blanca	Osvaldo Casanova	3,950
Boca Juniors	Buenos Aires	Luis Conde	2,000
Ciclista Olímpico	La Banda	Luis Conde	2,000
Gimnasia y Esgrima (Comodoro Rivadavia)	Comodoro Rivadavia	Socios Fundadores	2,276
Juventud Sionista	Paraná	Estadio Moisés Flesler	2,100
Lanús	Lanús	Antonio Rotili	4,000
Libertad	Sunchales	El Hogar de los Tigres	4,000
Obras Sanitarias	Buenos Aires	Estadio Obras	3,100
Peñarol	Mar del Plata	Islas Malvinas	8,000
Quimsa	Santiago del Estero	Estadio Ciudad	5,200
Regatas Corrientes	Corrientes	José Jorge Contte	4,000
La Unión	Formosa	Cincuentenario	4,500
Unión Progresista	Villa Ángela	Estadio Carlos "Mona" Lobera	1,750

== Regular season ==
=== First stage ===
The first stage took place between 14 September and 28 October 2012. Teams were divided into two zones. The top four teams from each zone competed in the Torneo Súper 8 that took place in November.

==== North Zone ====
Pos	Team	Pld	W	L	Pts	Qualification
1	Libertad	14	10	4	24	Qualified to Torneo Súper 8
2	Ciclista Olímpico	14	10	4	24	Qualified to Torneo Súper 8
3	Regatas Corrientes	14	9	5	23	Qualified to Torneo Súper 8
4	Quimsa	14	8	6	22	Qualified to Torneo Súper 8
5	Juventud Sionista	14	7	7	21	
6	Atenas	14	6	8	20	
7	Unión Progresista	14	4	10	18	
8	La Unión	14	2	12	16	

==== South Zone ====
Pos	Team	Pld	W	L	Pts	Qualification
1	Peñarol	14	12	2	26	Qualified to Torneo Súper 8
2	Lanús	14	9	5	23	Qualified to Torneo Súper 8
3	Argentino de Junín	14	8	6	22	Qualified to Torneo Súper 8
4	Boca Juniors	14	7	7	21	Qualified to Torneo Súper 8
5	Bahía Basket	14	6	8	20	
6	Gimnasia Indalo	14	6	8	20	
7	Obras Sanitarias	14	4	10	18	
8	9 de Julio de Río Tercero	14	4	10	18	

=== Torneo Súper 8 ===
The eighth edition of Torneo Súper 8 took place on 7–10 November 2012 in the city of Corrientes, Corrientes. Regatas Corrientes won their second title, defeating Quimsa in the Final, and were granted a berth in the 2013 Liga Sudamericana de Básquetbol.

Quarterfinals
Libertad	74
Regatas Corrientes	81
Lanús	67
Boca Juniors	69
Ciclista Olímpico	81
Argentino de Junín	72
Peñarol	66
Quimsa	74

Semifinals
Regatas Corrientes	71
Boca Juniors	67
Ciclista Olímpico	71
Quimsa	72

Final
Regatas Corrientes	77
Quimsa	63

=== Second stage ===
The second stage started on 1 November 2013. All 16 teams were ranked together. Each team carried over half of the points obtained in the first stage.

Pos	Team	Pld	W	L	Pts	Qualification or relegation
1	Regatas Corrientes	30	24	6	65.5	Conference quarterfinals
2	Lanús	30	21	9	62.5	Conference quarterfinals
3	Peñarol	30	18	12	61	Conference quarterfinals
4	Boca Juniors	30	20	10	60.5	Conference quarterfinals
5	Argentino de Junín	30	17	13	58	Reclassification playoffs
6	Quimsa	30	16	14	57	Reclassification playoffs
7	Ciclista Olímpico	31	15	16	58	Reclassification playoffs
8	Atenas	30	16	14	56	Reclassification playoffs
9	Juventud Sionista	30	15	15	55.5	Reclassification playoffs
10	Gimnasia Indalo	30	15	15	55	Reclassification playoffs
11	Libertad	30	13	17	55	Reclassification playoffs
12	Bahía Basket	30	14	16	54	Reclassification playoffs
13	Obras Sanitarias	30	13	17	52	Relegation playoffs
14	La Unión	30	9	21	48	Relegation playoffs
15	9 de Julio de Río Tercero	30	8	22	46	Relegation playoffs
16	Unión Progresista	30	6	24	45	Relegation playoffs

== Playoffs ==
=== Championship playoffs ===
The Playoffs started on 13 March 2013 and ended on 15 May 2013. Regatas Corrientes defeated Lanús in the Finals and won their first title. Both teams were qualified for the 2014 FIBA Americas League. Since Regatas Corrientes had also qualified to the 2013 Liga Sudamericana de Básquetbol after winning the Torneo Súper 8, their berth was given to the next best team that was not qualified yet, in this case Argentino de Junín.

Reclassification
7	Ciclista Olímpico	0
10	Gimnasia Indalo	3
5	Argentino de Junín	3
12	Bahía Basket	2
8	Atenas	=3
9	Juventud Sionista
6	Quimsa	3
11	Libertad	2

Quarterfinals
1	Regatas Corrientes	3
10	Gimnasia Indalo	2
4	Boca Juniors	3
5	Argentino de Junín	0
2	Lanús	3
8	Atenas	0
3	Peñarol	3
6	Quimsa	1

Semifinals
1	Regatas Corrientes	3
4	Boca Juniors	2
2	Lanús	3
3	Peñarol	2

Final
1	Regatas Corrientes	4
2	Lanús	0

=== Relegation playoffs ===
The relegation series began on 14 March. Unión Progresista and 9 de Julio de Río Tercero lost their respective series and were relegated to the Torneo Nacional de Ascenso.

Finals
13	Obras Sanitarias	3
16	Unión Progresista	0

Finals
14	9 de Julio de Río Tercero	1
15	La Unión	3

== Clubs in international competitions ==
Team	Competition	Progress
Lanús	FIBA Americas League	Runners-up
Libertad	Liga Sudamericana de Básquetbol	Semifinals
Obras Sanitarias	Liga Sudamericana de Básquetbol	Semifinals
Peñarol	Liga Sudamericana de Básquetbol	Final four
Regatas Corrientes	Liga Sudamericana de Básquetbol	Champions

== Awards ==
=== Yearly Awards ===
- Most Valuable Player: Paolo Quinteros, Regatas Corrientes
- Best Foreign Player: Darren Phillip, Unión Progresista
- Sixth Man of the Year: Nicolás Romano, Regatas Corrientes
- Rookie of the Year: Federico Van Lacke, Boca Juniors
- Coach of the Year: Adrián Capelli, Argentino de Junín
- Most Improved Player: Adrián Boccia, Lanús
- All-Tournament Team:
  - F John de Groat, Boca Juniors
  - F Marcos Mata, Peñarol
  - C Daniel Santiago, Boca Juniors
  - G Facundo Campazzo, Peñarol
  - G Paolo Quinteros, Regatas Corrientes
