= Nicolás Aguirre =

Nicolás Aguirre may refer to:

- Nicolás Aguirre (basketball) (born 1988), Argentine basketball player
- Nicolás Aguirre (footballer) (born 1990), Argentine footballer
