= J'Vonne Parker =

American football player (born 1982)

No. 69, 60, 72, 98
- Position: Defensive tackle

Personal information
- Born: June 7, 1982 (age 44); Roanoke Rapids, North Carolina, U.S.
- Listed height: 6 ft 5 in (1.96 m)
- Listed weight: 338 lb (153 kg)

Career information
- College: Rutgers
- NFL draft: 2005: undrafted

Career history
- Cleveland Browns (2005); Dallas Cowboys (2006); Cleveland Browns (2006); Baltimore Ravens (2007–2008); Atlanta Falcons (2008)*; Carolina Panthers (2008); Denver Broncos (2009)
- * Offseason or practice squad member only

Career NFL statistics
- Total tackles: 5
- Fumble recoveries: 1
- Stats at Pro Football Reference

J'Vonne Dieunti Parker (born June 7, 1982) is an American former professional football player who was a defensive tackle in the National Football League (NFL). He was signed by the Cleveland Browns as an undrafted free agent in 2005. He played college football at Rutgers.

Parker was also a member of the Dallas Cowboys, Baltimore Ravens, Atlanta Falcons, Carolina Panthers, and Denver Broncos.

== Early life ==
Parker attended Newark Tech High School and West Side High School.

== College career ==
Parker played college football at Rutgers. As a senior, he played in 11 games, recording 19 tackles.

== Professional career ==
=== First stint with Browns ===
Parker was signed by the Cleveland Browns as an undrafted rookie free agent on April 29, 2005. After spending some time on their active roster where he played in four games and made five tackles, he was waived on September 3, 2006.

=== Dallas Cowboys ===
The following day, he was claimed by the Dallas Cowboys and appeared in two games before being waived.

=== Second stint with Browns ===
He was again signed by the Browns and played in four games.

=== Baltimore Ravens ===
On October 18, 2007, Parker was signed to the practice squad of the Baltimore Ravens. He was released on October 8, 2008.

=== Atlanta Falcons ===
On October 29, 2008, Parker was signed to the practice squad of the Atlanta Falcons. The team released defensive end Sean Conover to make room for Parker.

=== Carolina Panthers ===
Carolina Panthers signed Parker on December 23, 2008, when defensive tackle Gary Gibson was placed on Injured reserve.

=== Denver Broncos ===
On March 10, 2009, he was signed by the Denver Broncos. He was placed on season-ending injured reserve on August 8. On March 11, 2010, the Denver Broncos released Parker along with ILB Andra Davis.
