= Robert Battle (basketball) =

American professional basketball player

Robert Clark Battle (born May 5, 1981) is an American professional basketball player who plays for Quimsa of the Liga Nacional de Basquetbol of Argentina (LNB). Standing at 6-foot 8-inches, 230 pounds, Battle is a power forward and center. He is a two-time Super 8 champion in Argentina, one-time league champion in Argentina, Venezuela, Mexico, and in Spain's LEB Oro. Battle is also a six-time Argentina All-star, two-time Import Player of the Year in Argentina, one-time Player of the Year and MVP in LEB Oro, and a one-time Finals MVP in Mexico.

== High school career ==
Battle attended Northeast High School in Philadelphia, where he began playing basketball in ninth grade. He also was a standout in volleyball and football and was recruited by some Division II universities for football. In his senior year, Battle averaged 13 points and 12 rebounds per game. Despite being overshadowed for much of the year by a teammate, he performed well for the championship Hunting Park club team at the postseason Donofrio Classic in Conshohocken, Pennsylvania. After considering an offer from North Carolina A&T, Battle committed to Drexel on July 8, 1999.

== College career ==
At Drexel, Battle played four years though not receiving much playing time his freshmen and sophomore year under coach Steve Seymour. Not until his junior and senior year, under coach Bruiser Flint, did Battle become one of the top players in the Colonial Athletic Association (CAA). Before his college-career came to an end, he became a one thousand-point scorer, two-time defensive player of the year, two-time CAA first team selectee, and still holds the single season record in blocks with 116 and the single game record for blocks with nine. In his college career, he averaged 10.9 points and 6.0 rebounds per game. "It came out more successful than I thought it would," Battle said off his Drexel career in which he turned from a role player as a junior to the offensive and defensive force he became as a junior and senior. "I just didn't think I'd be able to do what I've done. But I waited my turn, and it worked out for the better."

== Professional career ==
In 2008, Battle averaged 12.9 points, 8.8 rebounds, and 2.0 blocks to lead Valladolid to the championship Spain's LEB Oro, the second division. He played for the Sacramento Kings in the 2009 NBA Summer League after going on a vacation to Las Vegas and met a team agent In 2013–14. Battle was on the Aerochaco Boca Juniors Capital Feder team in Argentina. He averaged 13.6 points per game and 9.0 rebound per game in five games in the Liga Sudamericana. He signed with Asociacion Quimsa Santiago del Estero in 2014.

He was named the Argentine League Finals MVP in 2015.
