= Newark Tech High School =

Technical school in Newark, New Jersey, United States

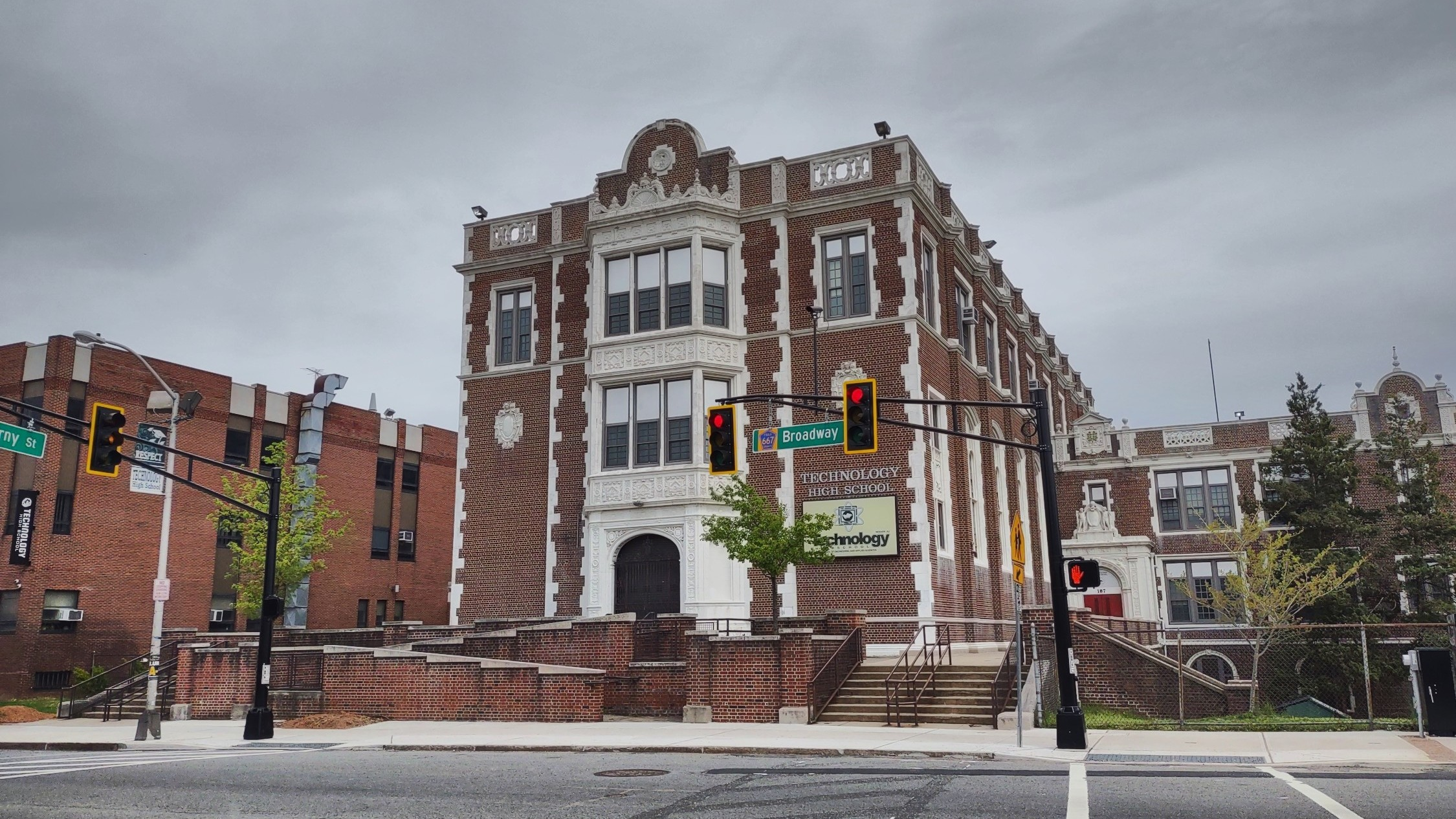
- Front facade

Location
- 91 West Market Street; Newark, Essex County, New Jersey 07103; United States; 40.739794°N 74.181867°W

Information
- Type: Vocational Public high school
- School district: Essex County Vocational Technical Schools
- NCES School ID: 340480000137
- Principal: Jenabu C. Williams
- Faculty: 56.0 FTEs
- Grades: 9-12
- Enrollment: 606 (as of 2024–25)
- Student to teacher ratio: 10.8:1
- Colors: Purple and white
- Athletics conference: Super Essex Conference
- Sports: cheerleading, cross country, bowling, soccer, volleyball, softball, baseball, basketball, track and field
- Team name: Terriers
- Website: www.essextech.org/o/ecnt

Newark Tech High School is a regional public high school located in Newark, that offers occupational and academic instruction for students in Essex County, in the U.S. state of New Jersey, serving students in ninth through twelfth grades as part of the Essex County Vocational Technical Schools.

As of the 2024–25 school year, the school had an enrollment of 606 students and 56.0 classroom teachers (on an FTE basis), for a student–teacher ratio of 10.8:1. There were 439 students (72.4% of enrollment) eligible for free lunch and 83 (13.7% of students) eligible for reduced-cost lunch.

Students are required to abide by the school's uniform / dress code policy.

== Awards, recognition and rankings ==
In 2015, Newark Tech was one of 15 schools in New Jersey, and one of nine public schools, recognized as a National Blue Ribbon School in the exemplary high performing category by the United States Department of Education.

The school was the 156th-ranked public high school in New Jersey out of 322 schools statewide, in New Jersey Monthly magazine's September 2010 cover story on the state's "Top Public High Schools", after being ranked 165th in 2008 out of 316 schools. The school was ranked 204th in the magazine's September 2006 issue, which surveyed 316 schools across the state.

== Athletics ==
The Newark Tech Terriers compete in the Super Essex Conference, which was established following a reorganization of sports leagues in Northern New Jersey by the New Jersey State Interscholastic Athletic Association (NJSIAA). The school had previously competed in the Mountain Valley Conference before the 2010 realignment. With 593 students in grades 10–12, the school was classified by the NJSIAA for the 2019–20 school year as Group II for most athletic competition purposes, which included schools with an enrollment of 486 to 758 students in that grade range. Colors are purple, silver, and black.

=== Track and field ===
As of 2011, the girls' track and field was ranked number 3 in the nation for the Shuttle hurdles relay and the boys 4x400 team competed in the New Balance nationals. Both boys and girls team were successful in the Penn Relays track meet, with the boys winning first place in their heat in the 4x400 relay meter dash.

The girls' spring track team won the Group I state championship in 2011 and 2012.

In 2012, the girls' track team won their second consecutive Group I outdoor track and field championship with 93 points, more than double the score earned by the second-place team Weequahic High School which earned 44 points.

The girls' indoor relay team won the Group I state championship in 2013.

=== Basketball ===
==== Boys ====
The boys' basketball team won the Group II state championship in 1991 (defeating South River High School in the tournament final)and won the Group II title in 2013 (vs. Burlington County Institute of Technology Medford Campus), 2014 (vs. Camden High School) and 2015 (vs. Camden). The 2013 team won the Group II title with a 56–44 win against Medford Tech in the championship game played at the Rutgers Athletic Center. The team won the Group II title in 2014 with a 48–44 win in the tournament final, overcoming a Camden lead of seven points with eight minutes left to play.

==== Girls ====
The girls' basketball team won the North II Group II state sectional championships in 2015, defeating top-seeded Lincoln High School by a score of 47–39 in the tournament final. The NJSIAA considered forcing the team to vacate the sectional title, after finding that two players who had attended a charter school had played on the team, in violation of eligibility rules.

The team repeated as North II Group II sectional champion in 2016 with a 40–26 win against Ridgefield Park High School and won third title in four years in 2018 with an 81–50 victory against Hanover Park High School in the tournament final.

The team won the Essex County Tournament for the first time in 2017, defeating West Orange High School with a last-second layup in overtime to win 55–53 in the final. The team went on to repeat as Essex County Tournament Champion in 2018, defeating University High School by a score of 71–62.

== Administration ==
The school's principal is Jenabu C. Williams.

== Notable alumni ==
- Eric Anderson (born 1993), professional basketball player who last played for FC Porto in the Liga Portuguesa de Basquetebol
- Amara Kamara (born 1988, class of 2007), former gridiron football linebacker
- J'Vonne Parker (born 1982), former American football defensive tackle
