= Silvio Santander =

Argentine basketball coach (born 1972)

Personal information
- Born: 19 January 1972 (age 54) Lanús, Argentina
- Position: Head coach
- Coaching career: 2001–present

Career history

Coaching
- 2001–2002: Atlético Echagüe
- 2003: Peñarol
- 2003–2005: Regatas Corrientes
- 2005–2006: Argentino de Junín
- 2006: Soles de Mexicali
- 2006–2009: Regatas Corrientes
- 2009–2013: Club Lanús
- 2013–2019: Quimsa
- 2020–2021: San Lorenzo
- 2021: Guaiqueríes de Margarita
- 2023–2024: Corinthians
- 2024: Marinos B.B.C.
- 2025: Soles de Mexicali
- 2026: El Calor de Cancún

Silvio José Santander (born 19 January 1972) is an Argentine basketball coach. He is the head coach of the Soles de Mexicali.

== Coaching career ==
Santander started his coaching career in Argentina with Atlético Echagüe. From 2013 to 2019 he was the head coach of Quimsa where he won the championship. In 2023 he joined Corinthians of the Novo Basquete Brasil. In 2024, he signed with Marinos B.B.C.. In 2025, he became the coach of Soles de Mexicali.
