= Carlos Cerutti =

Argentine basketball player

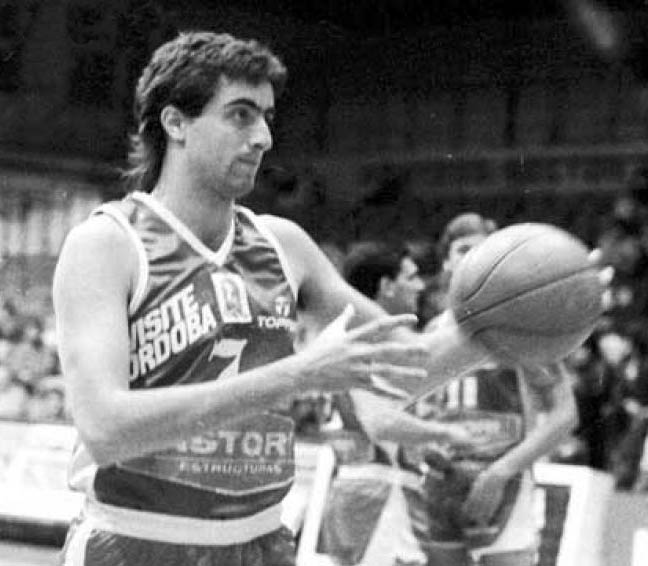
- Cerutti while playing for Atenas

Personal information
- Born: February 12, 1969 Morteros, Córdoba Province, Argentina
- Died: May 3, 1990 (aged 21) Córdoba, Córdoba Province, Argentina
- Listed height: 6 ft 8.5 in (2.04 m)

Career information
- Playing career: 1985–1990
- Position: Center

Career history
- 1985–90: Atenas (Argentina)

Career highlights
- Argentine League Finals MVP (1988); 3× LNB Champion (1987–1988, 1990)
Medals
Representing bk
Men's Basketball
FIBA South American Championship
Gold medal – first place	1987 Asunción	National Team

Carlos Alberto Cerutti (Morteros, February 12, 1969 – Córdoba, May 3, 1990) was an Argentine professional basketball player. He was a 2.04 m (6 ft 8 1/2 in) tall center. One of the most promising basketball players of his era, Cerutti died in a car accident in May 1990.

In 1992, the Polideportivo San Martín of Córdoba was renamed "Carlos Cerutti" in his honor.

== Biography ==
Cerutti was a three time Argentine league champion with Atenas (in 1987, 1988, and 1990). He was selected as the league's finals Most Valuable Player in 1988, and also participated in the league's all-star games of 1989 and 1990.

Cerutti also represented the Argentine national team. He won the 1987 South American Championship, and the 1988 Youth South American Championship with his country.

Cerutti suffered serious injuries in a car accident on April 21, 1990. He was admitted to a hospital at Córdoba City, where died on May 3, 1990, aged 21. Cerutti died after the last game of the 1990 Argentine basketball league's regular season. His team, Atenas, went on to win the league's championship.

== Honours ==
=== Club ===
Atenas

- Liga Nacional de Básquet (3): 1987, 1988, 1990

=== Individual ===
- LNB Finals MVP (1): 1988
- Municipal Arena of Córdoba named in his honour
