= Juan Pedro Gutiérrez =

Argentine-Spanish basketball player

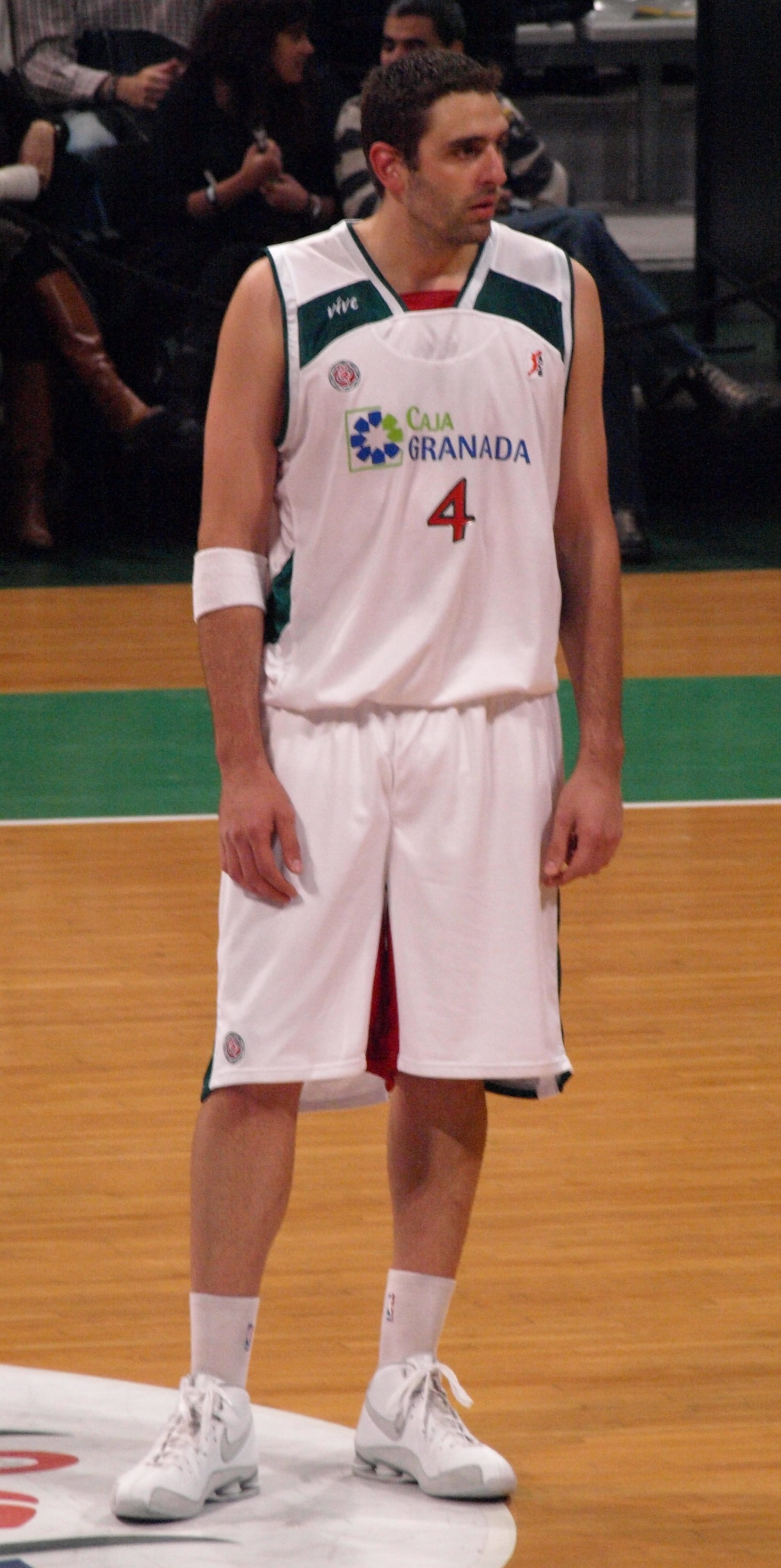
- Gutiérrez wearing the jersey of Granada, in 2009.

Personal information
- Born: October 10, 1983 (age 43) Nueve de Julio, Buenos Aires, Argentina
- Listed height: 6 ft 8.75 in (2.05 m)
- Listed weight: 250 lb (113 kg)

Career information
- Playing career: 2001–2016
- Position: Power forward / center
- Number: 4

Career history
- 2001–2004: Obras Sanitarias
- 2004–2010: Granada
- 2010–2013: Obras Sanitarias
- 2013–2014: CB Canarias
- 2014–2016: Obras Sanitarias

Career highlights
- FIBA South American League MVP (2011); 2× Argentine League MVP (2011, 2012); Argentine League rebounding leader (2011)
Medals
Men's basketball
Representing Argentina
Summer Olympic Games
Bronze medal – third place	2008 Beijing
FIBA Diamond Ball
Gold medal – first place	2008 Nanjing
FIBA AmeriCup
Gold medal – first place	2011 Mar del Plata
Silver medal – second place	2005 Santo Domingo
Silver medal – second place	2007 Las Vegas
Bronze medal – third place	2009 Puerto Rico
Bronze medal – third place	2013 Venezuela
FIBA South American Championship
Gold medal – first place	2004 Rio de Janeiro
Gold medal – first place	2008 Puerto Montt
Gold medal – first place	2012 Resistencia
Silver medal – second place	2010 Neiva
Bronze medal – third place	2006 Caracas

Juan Pedro Gutiérrez Lanas, commonly known as either Juampi Gutiérrez or J. P. Gutiérrez, (born October 10, 1983) is a former Argentine-Spanish professional basketball player. He played at the power forward and center positions.

== Professional career ==
Gutiérrez began his professional career in the Liga Nacional de Básquet with Obras Sanitarias during the 2001–02 season. In 2004, he joined the Spanish ACB League club Granada. He returned to Obras Sanitarias in 2010, where he played for two seasons, when the club won two titles. He signed with the Spanish League club CB Canarias for the 2013–14 season.

== National team career ==
Gutiérrez defended Argentina, making his debut in 2004 at the FIBA South American Championship, bringing home a gold medal at the 2011 FIBA Americas Championship, silver medals at the 2005 FIBA Americas Championship and the 2007 FIBA Americas Championship, and bronze medals at the 2008 Summer Olympic Games and the 2009 FIBA Americas Championship.

== Awards and accomplishments ==
=== Pro career ===
- FIBA South American League MVP: (2011)
- 2× Argentine League MVP: (2011, 2012)

=== Argentina national team ===
- 2004 FIBA South American Championship: Gold
- 2005 FIBA Americas Championship: Silver
- 2006 FIBA South American Championship: Bronze
- 2007 FIBA Americas Championship: Silver
- 2008 FIBA South American Championship: Gold
- 2008 FIBA Diamond Ball Tournament: Gold
- 2008 Summer Olympic Games: Bronze
- 2009 FIBA Americas Championship: Bronze
- 2010 FIBA South American Championship: Silver
- 2011 FIBA Americas Championship: Gold
- 2012 FIBA South American Championship: Gold
