= Nicolás Aguirre (basketball) =

Argentine basketball player

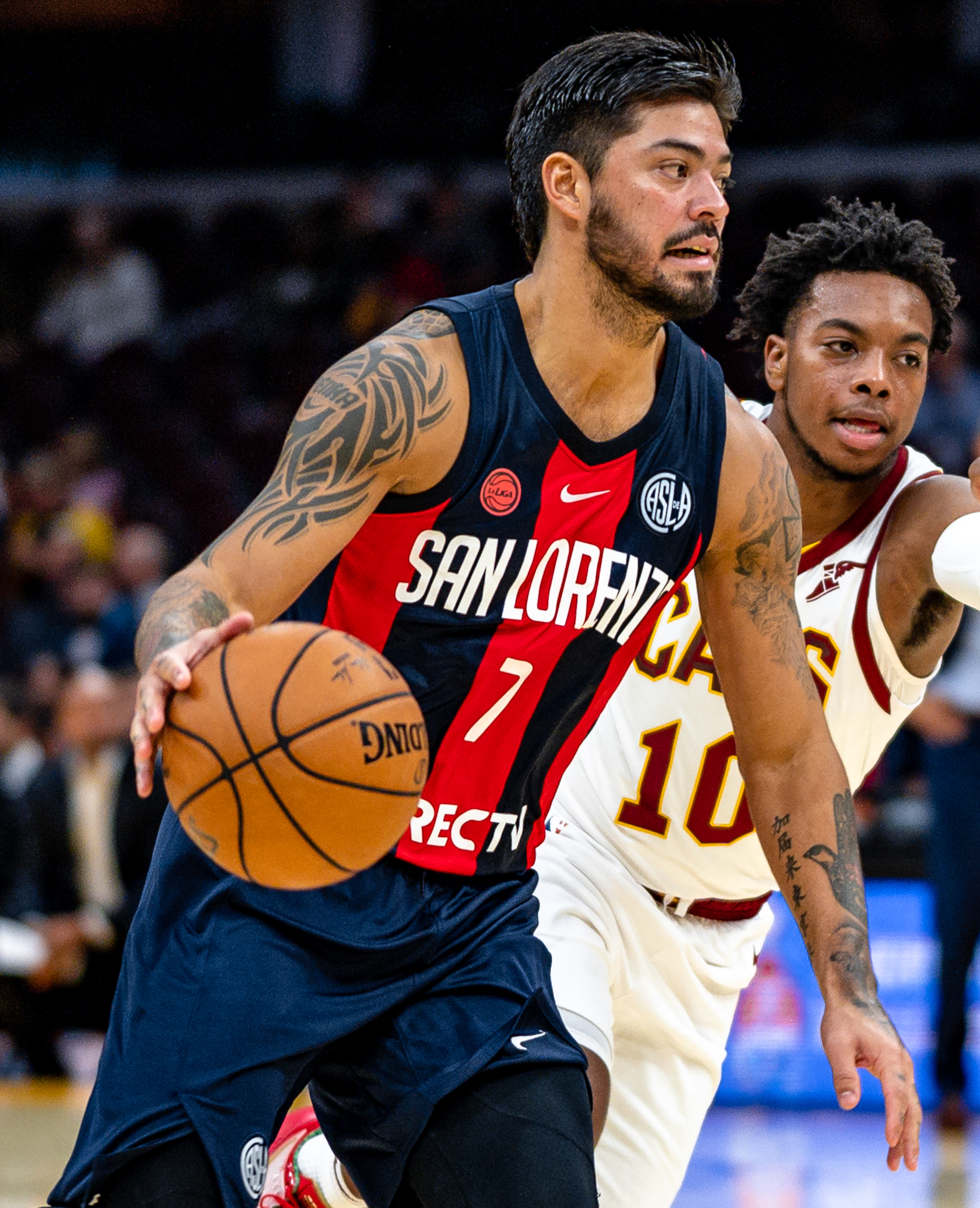
- Aguirre with San Lorenzo in 2019

No. 7 – Flamengo
- Position: Point guard / shooting guard
- League: Liga Nacional de Básquet; BCL Americas

Personal information
- Born: 31 March 1988 (age 38) Santiago del Estero, Argentina
- Listed height: 6 ft 3 in (1.91 m)
- Listed weight: 185 lb (84 kg)

Career information
- Playing career: 2007–present

Career history
- 2007–2008: Quilmes de Mar del Plata
- 2008–2010: Boca Juniors
- 2010–2011: La Unión de Formosa
- 2011–2013: Quimsa
- 2014: Juventud Sionista
- 2014–2017: Quimsa
- 2017–2021: San Lorenzo
- 2021–2022: Fuerza Regia de Monterrey
- 2022–present: Flamengo

Career highlights
- No. 7 retired by Quimsa; 5× Argentine League champion (2015–2018, 2021); Argentine Super 4 Cup winner (2017); Argentine Super 8 Cup winner (2014); Argentine League MVP (2015); Argentine Super 8 Cup MVP (2014)

Gustavo Nicolás Aguirre (born 31 March 1988) is an Argentine professional basketball player, currently playing for Flamengo Basketball of the New Basketball Brazil.

== Professional career ==
Aguirre was the Argentine Super 8 Cup MVP in 2014, and the Argentine League's MVP in 2015.

== National team career ==
Aguirre represented the senior Argentine national basketball team at the 2015 Pan American Games, in Toronto, Canada.
