= Polideportivo Municipal Carlos Cerutti =

Sports arena in Córdoba, Argentina

Carlos Cerutti Municipal Arena
- Polideportivo Municipal Carlos Cerutti
- Interactive map of Carlos Cerutti Municipal Arena
- Address: Pinzón 1050; Córdoba; Argentina
- Owner: Municipality of Córdoba
- Capacity: 3,500
- Type: Arena
- Surface: Parquet
- Parking: yes

Construction
- Opened: 1988
- Renovated: 2021

Tenant
- A.D. Atenas

Polideportivo Municipal Carlos Cerutti is an arena located in the city of Córdoba, Argentina. Owned by the Municipal Government, the arena is primarily used for basketball games, serving as the home arena of local club Atenas. The Polideportivo also hosts several other activities and sports organised by the municipality, including futsal, volleyball, roller hockey and boxing.

The arena, which has a capacity for 3,500 people, was named after Carlos Cerutti, an Atenas player who died in a car accident in May 1990. One of the most promising basketball players during those years, Cerutti was one of the occupants of a Peugeot 504 that crashed in the city of Morteros. He died after 14 days of being hospitalised.

In 2021, the arena was refurbished by the Municipality. Works included the installation of new LED devices, painting, and the repair of roof and playing surface. Before of that, all the repairs had been costed by Club Atenas.

The local government also tributed some of the most notable Cordobese players and coaches in the history of Liga Nacional de Básquet when in 2023, their names were given to different sectors of the arena. Players honored included Marcelo Milanesio, Rubén Magnano, Fabricio Oberto, Héctor Campana, among other key figures.
