= Eric Anderson (basketball, born 1993) =

American professional basketball player

Nacional
- Position: Power forward / center

Personal information
- Born: April 15, 1993 (age 33)
- Listed height: 2.04 m (6 ft 8 in)
- Listed weight: 235 lb (107 kg)

Career information
- High school: Newark Tech (Newark, New Jersey)
- College: New Haven (2011–2015)
- NBA draft: 2015: undrafted
- Playing career: 2015–present

Career history
- 2015: Gladiators Trier
- 2015–2016: T71 Dudelange
- 2016–2017: Tokyo Cinq Rêves
- 2017: T71 Dudelange
- 2017–2018: Villa Mitre
- 2018–2019: Obras Sanitarias
- 2019–2020: Maccabi Haifa
- 2020–2021: FC Porto
- 2024–present: Nacional

Career highlights
- Total League Defensive Player of the Year (2016); 3× Northeast-10 Defensive Player of the Year (2013–2015); 2× First-team All-Northeast-10 (2014, 2015)

Eric Anderson (born April 15, 1993) is an American professional basketball player who last played for FC Porto in the Liga Portuguesa de Basquetebol. He played college basketball for the University of New Haven before playing professionally in Germany, Luxembourg, Japan, Argentina and Israel.

== Early life and college career ==
Anderson attended Newark Tech High School in Newark, New Jersey, where he was named an All-Conference, All-County and All-State selection in 2010–11 as a senior.

Anderson played college basketball at the University of New Haven, where he played for head coach Ted Hotaling. He was named the Northeast-10 Conference Defensive Player of the Year for three consecutive seasons. Anderson averaged an NCAA Division II best 13.1 rebounds, to go with 16.7 points, 3.8 assists and 1.5 blocks per game in his senior year.

== Professional career ==
=== 2015–16 season ===
On August 3, 2015, Anderson started his professional career with Gladiators Trier of the German ProA. In 10 games, he averaged 10.5 points, 8.0 rebounds, 1.5 assists and 1.0 blocks per game.

On December 14, 2015, Anderson signed with T71 Dudelange of Luxembourg's Total League. In 18 games with Dudelange during the 2016–17 season, he finished second on the team with a 51.3 percent effort from the field (117-of-228), averaging 17.1 points per game. He also pulled in a team-best 12.6 rebounds per contest and led the team with 2.2 blocks per outing. Anderson helped lead Dudelange to a 23–7 overall record. On May 16, 2016, Anderson was named the Total League Defensive Player of the Year.

=== 2016–17 season ===
On August 23, 2016, Anderson signed with Tokyo Cinq Rêves of the Japanese B.League. In 26 B.League games played during the 2016–17 season, he averaged 13.5 points, 9.9 rebounds, 1.5 assists, 1.2 steals and 1.5 blocks per game. On February 27, 2017, Anderson parted ways with Tokyo Cinq Rêves to join T71 Dudelange for a second stint, signing for the rest of the season.

=== 2017–18 season ===
On October 11, 2017, Anderson signed with Villa Mitre of the Argentine LLA, the second division of the Argentine league system. On March 11, 2018, Anderson recorded a career-high and a double-double of 35 points and 16 rebounds, shooting 14-of-18 from the field, along with three blocks and three steals in a 90–79 win over Gimnasia La Plata. In 46 games played for Villa Mitre, he averaged 17.9 points, 11.6 rebounds and 2.3 assists per game with the team falling to Estudiantes de Olavarría in the quarterfinal round.

=== 2018–19 season ===
On May 9, 2018, Anderson signed with Obras Sanitarias of the Argentine LNB. In 42 games played during the 2018–19 season, he finished the season as the league fourth-leading rebounder with 8.9 rebounds per game, to go with 14.5 points, 1 assist and 1.3 blocks per game.

=== 2019–20 season ===
On June 26, 2019, Anderson signed a one-year deal with Maccabi Haifa of the Israeli Premier League. On October 10, 2019, Anderson has been ruled for three months after he suffered a foot injury during a pre-season match against the Memphis Grizzlies. He averaged 4.5 points and 3 rebounds per game.

=== 2020–21 season ===
On August 18, 2020, Anderson signed with FC Porto in the Liga Portuguesa de Basquetebol.
