= Argentino de Junín =

Professional basketball club in Junín, Argentina

- Leagues: LNB
- Founded: October 1, 1935; 91 years ago
- Arena: El Fortín de las Morochas
- Location: Junín, Buenos Aires, Argentina
- Team colors: Blue, White
- President: Joaquin Marcaccio
- Head coach: Julian Pagura
Home	Away

Club Atlético Argentino de Junín, known simply as Argentino de Junín, is a professional basketball club based in Junín, Buenos Aires Province, Argentina. It was founded in 1938, and its home arena is the El Fortín de las Morochas, which has recently been remodeled to increase its capacity.

== Players ==
=== Current roster ===
Argentino (J) roster
Players
Coaches

Pos.	No.	Nat.	Name	Ht.	Age
PG	1	(Argentina) (United States)	Árias, Juan	1.77 m (5 ft 10 in)	19 – 25 April 2007
SF	2	(Argentina)	Pablo, Aaron	1.98 m (6 ft 6 in)	26 – 7 January 2000
PG	4	(Argentina)	Frontera, Jeremias	1.85 m (6 ft 1 in)	26 – 12 January 2000
SF	11	(Argentina)	Reyes, Ángel	2.01 m (6 ft 7 in)	24 – 10 May 2002
G	14	(Uruguay)	Trelles, Martín	1.87 m (6 ft 2 in)	30 – 24 January 1996
C	15	(Brazil)	Demetrio, JP	2.08 m (6 ft 10 in)	31 – 20 May 1995
C	19	(Argentina)	Podesta, Fernando	2.05 m (6 ft 9 in)	34 – 10 March 1992
SG	20	(Argentina)	Bilbao, Santiago	1.96 m (6 ft 5 in)	21 – 4 January 2005
PG	22	(Argentina)	Sandrini, Jeremias	1.85 m (6 ft 1 in)	33 – 3 May 1993

Head coach

- (Argentina) Julian Pagura

Assistant coach(es)

- (Argentina) Diego Camún

Legend

- (C) Team captain
- Injured

- Roster
Updated: 2020-01-01
