= 2018–19 Liga Nacional de Básquet season =

Liga Nacional de Básquet
- League: Liga Nacional de Básquet
- Season: 2018–19
- Duration: 22 September 2018 – 12 May 2019 (regular season)
- TV partner(s): TyC Sports; DirecTV Sports

Regular season
- Champions League Americas: San Lorenzo; Instituto
- Liga Sudamericana: Ferro Carril Oeste; Ciclista Olímpico
- Season MVP: (Argentina) Marcos Mata
- Promoted: Libertad
- Relegated: Quilmes

Finals
- Champions: San Lorenzo; 4th title
- Runners-up: Instituto
- Finals MVP: (Jordan) Dar Tucker
- All statistics correct as of 5 July 2019.

The 2018–19 Liga Nacional de Básquet season is the 35th season of the top professional basketball league in Argentina. The season started on 22 September 2017 with the Torneo Súper 20, which finished on 22 December 2018. The regular season began on 5 December 2018 and finished on 12 May 2019. Following the last season, the competition continues with all 20 teams being placed in a single group, playing a double round-robin, where the best 16 teams at the end of the season qualify for the championship playoffs, while the two teams with the worst record play in a best-of-five relegation series. Before the start of the regular season, the Torneo Súper 20 took place, which awarded two berths to the 2019 Liga Sudamericana de Básquetbol. Quilmes was relegated after losing the playoff series against Atenas.

== Relegation and promotion ==
La Liga Argentina de Básquet Champions Libertad covered the berth left by Salta Basket, who lost the relegation playoffs against Ferro Carril Oeste.

== Clubs ==
Team	City	Arena	Capacity
Argentino (J)	Junín	El Fortín de las Morochas	1,500
Atenas	Córdoba	Carlos Cerutti	3,730
Boca Juniors	Buenos Aires	Luis Conde	2,000
Ciclista Olímpico	La Banda	Vicente Rosales	3,400
Comunicaciones	Mercedes	Estadio de Comunicaciones	3,500
Estudiantes Concordia	Concordia	Gigante Verde	1,610
Ferro Carril Oeste	Buenos Aires	Estadio Héctor Etchart	4,500
Gimnasia y Esgrima (CR)	Comodoro Rivadavia	Socios Fundadores	2,276
Hispano Americano	Río Gallegos	Gimnasio Boxing Club	3,000
Instituto	Córdoba	Angel Sandrin	2,000
La Unión	Formosa	Cincuentenario	4,500
Libertad	Sunchales	El Hogar de los Tigres	4,000
Obras Basket	Buenos Aires	Estadio Obras	3,100
Peñarol	Mar del Plata	Islas Malvinas	8,000
Quilmes	Mar del Plata	Once Unidos	3,000
Quimsa	Santiago del Estero	Estadio Ciudad	5,200
Regatas Corrientes	Corrientes	José Jorge Contte	4,000
San Lorenzo	Buenos Aires	Polideportivo Roberto Pando	2,200
San Martín (C)	Corrientes	Raúl A. Ortiz	2,500
Weber Bahía	Bahía Blanca	Osvaldo Casanova	3,950

== Torneo Súper 20 ==
The second edition of the pre-season tournament Torneo Súper 20 took place between 22 September and 22 december 2018. Four groups of five teams each were formed, and played a double round-robin. The top three teams from each group advanced to the playoff stage directly, while the fourth and fifth teams of each group were paired in four best-of-three series to grant the four remaining berths for the playoff stage. The playoff stage consisted of best-of-three series up to the semifinals, where a final four, single-elimination match format was used.

=== First stage ===
==== Group A ====
Pos	Team	Pld	W	L	PCT	Qualification
1	Estudiantes Concordia	8	5	3	.625	Playoffs
2	La Unión	8	4	4	.500	Playoffs
3	Comunicaciones	8	4	4	.500	Playoffs
4	San Martín (C)	8	4	4	.500	Repechage
5	Regatas Corrientes	8	3	5	.375	Repechage

Source: LNB

==== Group B ====
Pos	Team	Pld	W	L	PCT	Qualification
1	Atenas	8	5	3	.625	Playoffs
2	Instituto	8	5	3	.625	Playoffs
3	Quimsa	8	4	4	.500	Playoffs
4	Libertad	8	3	5	.375	Repechage
5	Ciclista Olímpico	8	3	5	.375	Repechage

Source: LNB

==== Group C ====
Pos	Team	Pld	W	L	PCT	Qualification
1	San Lorenzo	8	7	1	.875	Playoffs
2	Obras Basket	8	5	3	.625	Playoffs
3	Ferro Carril Oeste	8	4	4	.500	Playoffs
4	Boca Juniors	8	3	5	.375	Repechage
5	Hispano Americano	8	1	7	.125	Repechage

Source: LNB

==== Group D ====
Pos	Team	Pld	W	L	PCT	Qualification
1	Peñarol	8	6	2	.750	Playoffs
2	Gimnasia y Esgrima (CR)	8	5	3	.625	Playoffs
3	Argentino (J)	8	3	5	.375	Playoffs
4	Weber Bahía	8	3	5	.375	Repechage
5	Quilmes	8	3	5	.375	Repechage

Source: LNB

=== Playoffs ===
Repechage
D4	Weber Bahía	2
D5	Quilmes	0
B4	Libertad	0
B5	Ciclista Olímpico	2
C4	Boca Juniors	0
C5	Hispano Americano	2
A4	San Martín (C)	0
A5	Regatas Corrientes	2

First round
C1	San Lorenzo	2
D4	Weber Bahía	0
D2	Gimnasia y Esgrima (CR)	0
C3	Ferro Carril Oeste	2
A1	Estudiantes Concordia	0
B5	Ciclista Olímpico	2
B2	Instituto	1
A3	Comunicaciones	2
D1	Peñarol	1
C5	Hispano Americano	2
C2	Obras Basket	2
D3	Argentino (J)	0
B1	Atenas	1
A5	Regatas Corrientes	2
A2	La Unión	1
B3	Quimsa	2

Quarterfinals
C1	San Lorenzo	2
C3	Ferro Carril Oeste	0
A3	Comunicaciones	2
B5	Ciclista Olímpico	1
C2	Obras Basket	2
C5	Hispano Americano	0
B3	Quimsa	2
A5	Regatas Corrientes	0

Semifinals
C1	San Lorenzo	88
A3	Comunicaciones	81
C2	Obras Basket	67
B3	Quimsa	78

Final
C1	San Lorenzo	70
B3	Quimsa	76

== Regular season ==
=== League table ===
Pos	Team	Pld	W	L	PCT	Qualification or relegation
1	San Lorenzo	38	32	6	.842	Championship Playoffs
2	Instituto	38	25	13	.658	Championship Playoffs
3	Gimnasia y Esgrima (CR)	38	23	15	.605	Championship Playoffs
4	Comunicaciones	38	23	15	.605	Championship Playoffs
5	Ferro Carril Oeste	38	23	15	.605	Championship Playoffs
6	Obras Sanitarias	38	22	16	.579	Championship Playoffs
7	Regatas Corrientes	38	21	17	.553	Championship Playoffs
8	Boca Juniors	38	20	18	.526	Championship Playoffs
9	Estudiantes Concordia	38	20	18	.526	Championship Playoffs
10	San Martín (C)	38	19	19	.500	Championship Playoffs
11	Ciclista Olímpico	38	18	20	.474	Championship Playoffs
12	Quimsa	38	18	20	.474	Championship Playoffs
13	Libertad	38	17	21	.447	Championship Playoffs
14	La Unión	38	17	21	.447	Championship Playoffs
15	Weber Bahía	38	15	23	.395	Championship Playoffs
16	Hispano Americano	38	15	23	.395	Championship Playoffs
17	Argentino (J)	38	14	24	.368	
18	Peñarol	38	14	24	.368	
19	Atenas	38	12	26	.316	Relegation playoffs
20	Quilmes	38	12	26	.316	Relegation playoffs

Source: LNB

== Playoffs ==
Playoffs began on 15 May. The relegation series between Atenas and Quilmes began on 18 May.

=== Championship playoffs ===
First round
1	San Lorenzo	3
16	Hispano Americano	0
8	Boca Juniors	3
9	Estudiantes Concordia	2
4	Comunicaciones	3
13	Libertad	2
5	Ferro Carril Oeste	3
12	Quimsa	1
2	Instituto	3
15	Weber Bahía	0
7	Regatas Corrientes	3
10	San Martín (C)	1
3	Gimnasia (CR)	1
14	La Unión	3
6	Obras Sanitarias	2
11	Ciclista Olímpico	3

Quarterfinals
1	San Lorenzo	3
8	Boca Juniors	2
4	Comunicaciones	2
5	Ferro Carril Oeste	3
2	Instituto	3
7	Regatas Corrientes	2
11	Ciclista Olímpico	3
14	La Unión	2

Semifinals
1	San Lorenzo	3
5	Ferro Carril Oeste	1
2	Instituto	3
11	Ciclista Olímpico	0

Championship finals
1	San Lorenzo	4
2	Instituto	3

=== Finals ===
Team 1	Series	Team 2	Game 1	Game 2	Game 3	Game 4	Game 5	Game 6	Game 7
San Lorenzo	4–3	Instituto	71–69	78–74	66–75	80–83	96–80	78–96	79–71

=== Relegation playoffs ===
Finals
19	Atenas	3
20	Quilmes	0

== Clubs in international competitions ==
Team	Competition	Progress
Atenas	FIBA Americas League	Second stage
San Martín (C)	FIBA Americas League	First stage
San Lorenzo	FIBA Americas League	Champions
Instituto	Liga Sudamericana de Básquetbol	Runners-up
Libertad	Liga Sudamericana de Básquetbol	Semifinals
Quimsa	Liga Sudamericana de Básquetbol	Semifinals

== Awards ==
The regular season awards were presented on 13 May.

=== Yearly Awards ===
- Most Valuable Player: Marcos Mata, San Lorenzo
- Best Argentine Player: Marcos Mata, San Lorenzo
- Best Foreign Player: Dar Tucker, San Lorenzo
- Sixth Man of the Year: Luciano González, Instituto
- Rookie of the Year: Víctor Fernández, Quilmes
- Most Improved Player: Agustín Caffaro, Libertad
- Coach of the Year: Gonzalo García, San Lorenzo
- All-Tournament Team:
  - C Eloy Vargas, Gimnasia y Esgrima (CR)
  - PF Jasiel Rivero, Boca Juniors
  - SF Marcos Mata, San Lorenzo
  - SG Dar Tucker, San Lorenzo
  - PG Pedro Barral, Obras Sanitarias
