= José Vildoza =

Argentine basketball player (born 1996)

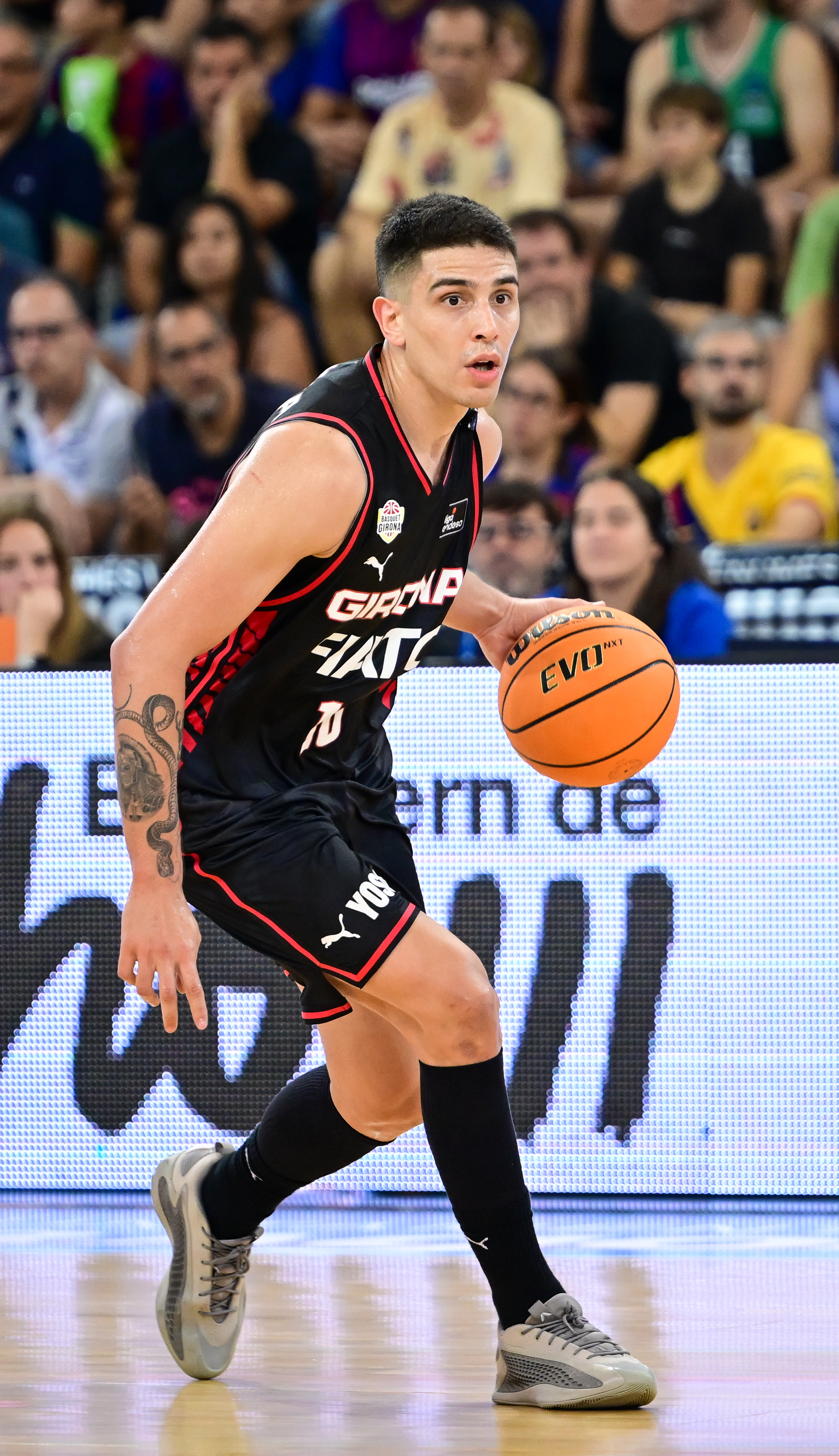
- Vildoza with Bàsquet Girona in 2025

No. 11 – Boca Juniors
- Position: Point guard
- League: Liga ACB

Personal information
- Born: January 15, 1996 (age 30) Córdoba, Argentina
- Listed height: 1.91 m (6 ft 3 in)
- Listed weight: 85 kg (187 lb)

Career information
- Playing career: 2012–present

Career history
- 2012–2017: Libertad
- 2017: Trotamundos
- 2017–2021: San Lorenzo
- 2021–2022: Cibona
- 2022–2023: Flamengo
- 2023–2025: Boca Juniors
- 2025–2026: Bàsquet Girona
- 2026–present: Boca Juniors

Career highlights
- Sixth Man of the Year of the LNB (2016-17); 5× Liga Nacional de Básquet champion (2017-18, 2018-19, 2020-21, 2023-24, 2024-25); 3× Supercopa de La Liga (2017, 2018, 2024); 2× FIBA Americas League champion (2018, 2019); U-23 Player of the Year (2018-19); Torneo Súper 20 (2019); Sixth Man of the Year in the BCLA (2019-20); 3× LNB Finals MVP (2020-21, 2023-24, 2024-25); Croatian Basketball League (2021–22); Krešimir Ćosić Cup (2021–22); 2× LNB Ideal Starting Five (2023-24, 2024-25); 2x LNB top scorer (2023-24, 2024-25); 2x LNB top three-point scorer (2023-24, 2024-25); LNB Season MVP (2024-25); Best Argentine Player of the LNB (2024–25); Copa Súper 20 champion (2025); FIBA AmeriCup's top three-point scorer (2025); All-FIBA AmeriCup Second Team (2025)
Medals
Event	1st	2nd	3rd
FIBA AmeriCup	1	1	0
Summer Youth Olympics	0	0	1
Total	1	1	1
Men's basketball
Representing Argentina
FIBA AmeriCup
Gold medal – first place	2022 Brazil	
Silver medal – second place	2025 Managua	
Summer Youth Olympics (3x3 basketball)
Bronze medal – third place	Nanjing 2014	

José Ignacio Vildoza (born 15 January 1996) is an Argentine professional basketball player for Boca Juniors of the Liga Nacional de Básquetbol. He is a 1.91 m tall point guard.

== Professional career ==
=== Libertad ===
José Vildoza joined Libertad de Sunchales in 2011 from Club Maipú in Córdoba, after standing out in the Argentine U17 Championship with the provincial team, where he was named Most Valuable Player. After that tournament, he was contacted by former player and now agent Luis Emilio Villar, who was interested in adding him to his team. According to Vildoza himself, the first time they met in person was when the agent traveled to Córdoba to meet him and jokingly proposed a one-on-one game on a neighborhood court. Vildoza accepted the challenge and ended up winning the informal match.

Following that first meeting, Villar supported him at the start of his professional career and secured a tryout for him at Libertad de Sunchales. The club added him to its youth program that same year.

He made his debut in the Liga Nacional de Básquet on September 14, 2012, at just 16 years old, under the coaching of Javier Bianchelli.

During his time at the club, he went through various stages of professional and personal growth. In several later interviews, Vildoza recalled that in March 2015 he considered leaving Libertad due to adaptation difficulties, but was unable to do so because there were no available buses back to his hometown.

During his time with the Santa Fe-based club, Vildoza played six consecutive seasons (2012–2017), progressively establishing himself as one of Argentina's top basketball prospects. In the 2016–17 season, he was named Sixth Man of the Year, averaging 16.2 points, 3.1 assists, and 3 rebounds per game, playing all 56 regular season matches.

In July 2017, following Libertad's decision to sell its top-division license due to financial reasons, Vildoza left the club and signed with San Lorenzo de Almagro. In his farewell, he expressed gratitude to the institution for having shaped him both athletically and personally.

=== Trotamundos ===
In June 2017, he was signed by Trotamundos de Carabobo, a team from the Liga Profesional de Baloncesto de Venezuela, to strengthen their roster ahead of the playoffs. Coming from Libertad de Sunchales, where he had been named Sixth Man of the Year of Argentina's Liga Nacional de Básquet, Vildoza joined the team coached by Argentine head coach Rubén Magnano.

His arrival aimed to provide playmaking and offensive versatility from the point guard position. The official announcement was made on June 5, 2017, and he made his debut in Game 3 of the conference semifinals against Guaros de Lara.

He played a total of two official games in the series, averaging 3.5 points, 2.5 rebounds, and 1.5 assists. The series ended with Trotamundos being eliminated 4–1. After his brief stint with the Venezuelan team, he returned to Libertad de Sunchales.

=== San Lorenzo ===
José Vildoza joined San Lorenzo in mid-July 2017. His arrival was part of the club's ambitious sporting project, which at the time dominated both Argentine and South American basketball. He made his debut during the team's tour of Spain, where San Lorenzo achieved notable victories against Real Madrid and Barcelona.

He was part of the roster that won three Liga Nacional de Básquet titles in the 2017–18, 2018–19, and 2020–21 seasons. In the latter championship, he was named Finals MVP after an outstanding performance against Quimsa.

He was also a back-to-back champion in the Liga de las Américas in 2018 and 2019, and also won the Torneo Súper 20 2019 and the Supercup in the 2017 and 2018 editions.

At the international level, he was part of the team that won the bronze medal at the FIBA Intercontinental Cup in the 2019 and 2020 editions. His performance with the club earned him national recognition and established him as one of the most prominent point guards in the country.

=== Cibona Zagreb ===
On June 4, 2021, José Vildoza was officially presented as a new player for Cibona Zagreb, one of the most important clubs in Croatia, which competes in the Croatian Basketball League (Premijer Liga) and the ABA League. He signed a two-season (1+1) contract under the guidance of coach Vladimir Jovanović.

During the 2021–22 season, Vildoza played 20 games in the ABA League, averaging 9.4 points, 3.7 assists, and 2.6 rebounds in 24.6 minutes per game, with shooting percentages of 39.7% from the field, 37.9% from three-point range, and 88.2% from the free-throw line. He had standout performances, such as in the victory over SC Derby on January 29, 2022, where he was the game's top scorer with 18 points and 6 assists.

On February 20, 2022, he was crowned champion of the Krešimir Ćosić Cup, after Cibona's 67–65 win over Cedevita Junior. In the final, Vildoza contributed 12 points (with 3/5 in three-pointers), 2 rebounds, 1 assist, and 1 steal. A few months later, on June 10, he won the Croatian League after defeating Zadar 3–2 in the finals series, although he was unable to play in the fifth game due to injury.

=== Flamengo ===
In July 2022, José Vildoza was announced as a new addition to Flamengo. The Argentine point guard signed with the team to strengthen its leadership in the Novo Basquete Brasil (NBB) and the Basketball Champions League Americas, filling the spot left vacant by fellow countryman Franco Balbi.

He made his official debut on October 16, 2022, in a win over Minas Tênis Clube, recording 19 points, 9 assists, 2 steals, and 1 rebound in 34 minutes of play, showing a quick adaptation to the team and the league. Throughout the 2022–23 season, Vildoza established himself as one of the most consistent players on the Rio de Janeiro squad, averaging 10.8 points, 3 assists, and 4 rebounds per game between the NBB and BCL Americas.

On January 14, 2023, he was one of the standout players in the quarterfinals of the Torneo Súper 8, delivering a performance of 26 points, 8 rebounds, and 5 assists against Paulistano. However, Flamengo failed to win titles that season, finishing as runners-up in the Basketball Champions League Americas 2022–23 after falling to Sesi Franca and later being eliminated in the semifinals of the national league.

=== Boca Juniors ===
After being approached by teams from the Liga ACB and Hebraica y Macabi of the Uruguayan Basketball League, his signing with Boca Juniors was confirmed on July 19, 2023, replacing point guard Franco Balbi for the Liga Nacional de Básquet 2023–24 and the Basketball Champions League Americas 2023–24.

Throughout the season, he quickly established himself as one of the team's leaders and a key piece in the offensive setup under head coach Carlos Duro.

During the playoffs, Boca eliminated San Lorenzo in the quarterfinals, defeated top seed Quimsa from Santiago del Estero in the semifinals, and defeated Instituto de Córdoba 4–2 in the finals. With that, the team became champions of the Liga Nacional for the fourth time in its history.

In Game 6 of the finals, played at Estadio Ángel Sandrín in Córdoba, Vildoza was decisive with 19 points, leadership, and poise at crucial moments. For his performance throughout the series, he was named Finals MVP, averaging 15.9 points, 4.8 rebounds, and 3.8 assists.

He ended the season averaging 16.3 points, 4.7 rebounds, and 3.6 assists in 38 official games, standing out as one of the league's top performers.

In August 2024, he confirmed his continuity at the club for two more seasons, despite receiving offers from abroad, including teams from Spain, Greece, and Poland.

On January 18, 2025, he won the 2024 Liga Supercup, scoring 24 points and 4 rebounds in the win over Quimsa by 90–75.

In March 2025, he won the 2025 Súper 20 Cup, defeating Obras 91–82 in the semifinals (after a tie at 72 in regulation), and Instituto 71–65 in the final. He averaged 15.5 points, 3 rebounds, and 3.5 assists.

On July 20, 2025, he was crowned back-to-back league champion in a series that went to seven games.

He played in 38 games during the regular season, averaging 16.3 points, 4.7 rebounds, and 3.7 assists in approximately 29 minutes per game. His performance earned him multiple accolades: MVP of the season, Best Argentine player, and starting point guard in the league's Ideal Five.

He maintained a high level in the playoffs and was once again named Finals MVP, as he had been the previous season. In the championship series against Instituto, he averaged 14.6 points, 5.1 rebounds, 3.6 assists, and 1.1 steals, with an average efficiency rating of 14.1 per game, totaling 102 points across the seven games of the final.

On August 1, 2025, José Vildoza officially announced his departure from Boca Juniors with the aim of continuing his career in Spain's Liga ACB. During his time with the xeneize team, he played a total of 119 official games, recording 1804 points, 553 rebounds, and 447 assists, with overall averages of 15.2 points, 4.6 rebounds, and 3.8 assists per game. His tenure at the club included the achievement of four titles and recognition with six individual awards.

=== Girona ===
On August 4, 2025, Vildoza signed a one-season contract with Bàsquet Girona of the Liga ACB.

== National team career ==
Vildoza was part of Argentina's youth national teams between 2011 and 2015. He competed in the 2011 South American U-15 Championship and the 2013 South American U-17 Championship, earning MVP honors in both tournaments. He also took part in the 2014 FIBA Americas U-18 Championship and the 2015 FIBA U-19 World Cup. Additionally, he was a member of the squad that won the bronze medal in the 3x3 basketball tournament at the 2014 Summer Youth Olympics in Nanjing.

In July 2016, he was selected by head coach Silvio Santander to represent Argentina at the Stanković Continental Cup in China. The roster was composed primarily of domestic-based young players. Argentina finished as runners-up after losing 70–57 to France in the final.

He made his senior national team debut on 20 February 2020 and was subsequently included in multiple squads under head coach Pablo Prigioni. He was part of the team that won the 2022 FIBA AmeriCup in Brazil, where Argentina defeated the host nation in the final. In the tournament, he appeared in five games and averaged 2.2 points, 0.8 rebounds, and 1.4 assists per game.

Vildoza also featured in the qualifying windows for the 2022 and 2025 editions of the FIBA AmeriCup. In the 2022 cycle, he averaged 9.0 points, 3.5 rebounds, and 3.0 assists across six games. During the 2025 qualifiers, he posted 12.8 points, 2.8 rebounds, 2.5 assists, and 2.5 steals per game in four appearances, emerging as one of Argentina's leading point guard options.

José Vildoza was part of the Argentine national team that played in the 2025 FIBA AmeriCup, held in Managua, Nicaragua, where the team finished as runner-up after losing the final to Brazil. In the tournament, Vildoza was the team captain and played six games in which he totaled 89 points (14.8 per game) in 189 minutes, shooting 28.0% on two-pointers (7/25), 46.7% on three-pointers (21/45), and 92.3% from the free-throw line (12/13). He also contributed 11 defensive rebounds, 3 offensive rebounds, 7 steals (1.2 per game), and stood out as one of the team's main playmakers with 32 assists overall (5.3 per game).

He had a standout performance in the semifinal against Canada, where he scored 26 points, including 7/9 in three-pointers, along with 6 assists and 3 rebounds, being one of Argentina's key players in reaching the final. Vildoza finished the tournament as the third-highest scorer, the leader in three-point field goals made, and the third-best assist provider, in addition to being selected to the All-FIBA AmeriCup Second Team.

== Statistics ==
Won the championship
Led the league

=== Club career ===
Team	Season / Competition	GP	PTS	MPG	Two-point field goals		Three-point field goals		Free throws		Rebounds		Ast
Team	Season / Competition	GP	PTS	MPG	M	Att	M	Att	M	Att	Def	Off	Ast
(Argentina) Libertad	LNB 2012-13	19	21	100	5	16	1	7	8	14	18	3	3
(Argentina) Libertad	TS8 2013	1	0	13	0	1	0	1	0	0	1	0	4
(Argentina) Libertad	LNB 2013-14	40	118	448	30	59	11	35	25	33	45	13	49
(Argentina) Libertad	LSC 2014	3	12	37	3	4	2	5	0	0	2	0	4
(Argentina) Libertad	LNB 2014-15	46	185	597	37	104	26	82	33	51	52	10	39
(Argentina) Libertad	TS4 2015	1	8	20	0	1	2	4	2	2	1	0	0
(Argentina) Libertad	LNB 2015-16	65	609	1374	126	275	83	250	108	136	135	28	91
(Argentina) Libertad	LNB 2016-17	58	937	1618	204	445	119	354	172	222	146	27	177
(Argentina) Libertad	Total	233	1890	4207	405	905	244	738	348	458	400	81	367
(Venezuela) Trotamundos	LPB 2017	2	7	29	1	5	1	4	2	2	3	2	3
(Venezuela) Trotamundos	Total	2	7	29	1	5	1	4	2	2	3	2	3
(Argentina) San Lorenzo	TS20 2017	10	51	148	9	24	8	26	9	11	12	1	10
(Argentina) San Lorenzo	S2017	1	11	40	2	4	2	7	1	2	4	0	4
(Argentina) San Lorenzo	LNB 2017-18	56	339	1089	60	123	64	169	27	39	93	12	111
(Argentina) San Lorenzo	LLA 2018	8	49	99	10	12	8	19	5	6	7	1	19
(Argentina) San Lorenzo	TS20 2018	14	82	223	10	30	18	44	8	14	14	1	22
(Argentina) San Lorenzo	S2018	1	6	9	0	0	2	3	0	0	2	0	0
(Argentina) San Lorenzo	LNB 2018-19	54	529	1264	109	229	86	244	53	78	128	20	138
(Argentina) San Lorenzo	LDA 2019	8	71	156	14	28	14	34	1	4	14	4	20
(Argentina) San Lorenzo	TS20 2019	11	112	260	26	50	17	46	9	14	34	3	34
(Argentina) San Lorenzo	LNB 2019–20	20	164	406	41	75	19	77	25	28	37	3	55
(Argentina) San Lorenzo	BCLA 2019-20	9	79	190	19	38	12	36	5	10	27	2	25
(Argentina) San Lorenzo	LNB 2020–21	42	625	1316	137	274	86	243	93	118	113	21	177
(Argentina) San Lorenzo	BCLA 2021	5	93	170	14	35	18	41	11	13	10	3	28
(Argentina) San Lorenzo	Total	239	2211	5370	451	922	354	989	247	337	495	71	643
(Croatia) Cibona Zagreb	KKC 2021–22	3	34	52	3	6	7	12	7	8	7	0	11
(Croatia) Cibona Zagreb	ADR 2021–22	20	187	504	29	69	33	87	30	34	45	7	73
(Croatia) Cibona Zagreb	CRO 2021–22	31	210	631	24	64	44	115	30	40	51	7	97
(Croatia) Cibona Zagreb	Total	54	431	1187	56	139	84	214	67	82	103	14	181
(Brazil) Flamengo	BCLA 2022-23	10	108	248	16	29	21	60	13	21	36	4	30
(Brazil) Flamengo	CS8 2022–23	3	57	96	12	24	9	17	6	9	22	1	13
(Brazil) Flamengo	NBB 2022–23	33	305	754	47	103	56	168	43	51	74	11	98
(Brazil) Flamengo	Total	46	470	1098	75	156	86	245	62	81	132	15	141
(Argentina) Boca Juniors	BCLA 2023-24	6	82	193	23	40	9	31	9	10	18	4	34
(Argentina) Boca Juniors	LNB 2023–24	53	854	1673	187	329	121	330	117	150	212	39	180
(Argentina) Boca Juniors	S2024	1	24	35	3	7	4	11	6	8	3	1	0
(Argentina) Boca Juniors	CS20 2025	2	31	70	5	11	4	15	9	10	6	0	7
(Argentina) Boca Juniors	BCLA 2024-25	10	123	290	20	47	23	62	14	17	31	1	46
(Argentina) Boca Juniors	LNB 2024–25	51	745	1572	134	276	118	342	123	144	232	16	187
(Argentina) Boca Juniors	Total	123	1859	3833	372	710	279	791	278	339	502	61	454
Career total		697	6868	15724	1360	2837	1048	2981	1004	1299	1635	244	1789

=== National team ===
Team	Tournament	GP	PTS	MPG	Two-point field goals		Three-point field goals		Free throws		Rebounds		Ast
Team	Tournament	GP	PTS	MPG	M	Att	M	Att	M	Att	Def	Off	Ast
(Argentina) National Team	FIBA AmeriCup 2022 Qualifiers	6	54	157	13	26	8	25	4	4	21	0	18
(Argentina) National Team	2022 FIBA AmeriCup	5	11	46	0	1	2	10	5	6	4	0	7
(Argentina) National Team	2023 World Cup Qualifiers	7	39	126	7	15	6	21	7	8	14	2	13
(Argentina) National Team	FIBA AmeriCup 2025 Qualifiers	4	51	116	12	19	7	25	6	6	7	4	9
(Argentina) National Team	2025 FIBA AmeriCup	6	89	189	7	25	21	45	12	13	11	3	32
(Argentina) National Team	Total	28	244	634	39	86	44	126	34	37	57	9	79

== Awards and accomplishments ==
=== Clubs ===
Title	Club	Country	Season
Liga Nacional de Básquet	San Lorenzo	Argentina	2017–18
Supercopa de La Liga	San Lorenzo	Argentina	2017–18
FIBA Americas League	San Lorenzo	Argentina	2018
Liga Nacional de Básquet	San Lorenzo	Argentina	2018–19
Supercopa de La Liga	San Lorenzo	Argentina	2018–19
FIBA Americas League	San Lorenzo	Argentina	2019
Torneo Súper 20	San Lorenzo	Argentina	2019
Liga Nacional de Básquet	San Lorenzo	Argentina	2020–21
Croatian League	Cibona Zagreb	Croatia	2021–22
Krešimir Ćosić Cup	Cibona Zagreb	Croatia	2021–22
Liga Nacional de Básquet	Boca Juniors	Argentina	2023–24
Supercopa de La Liga	Boca Juniors	Argentina	2024
Copa Súper 20	Boca Juniors	Argentina	2025
Liga Nacional de Básquet	Boca Juniors	Argentina	2024–25

=== National team ===
Team	Tournament
Argentina	Gold 2022 FIBA AmeriCup
Argentina	Silver 2025 FIBA AmeriCup

=== Individual ===
- Updated as of July 20, 2025.

Award	Club	Country	Season
Sixth Man of the Year	Libertad	Argentina	2016–17
All-Star Game	Libertad	Argentina	2017
All-Star Game	San Lorenzo	Argentina	2018
Best U-23	San Lorenzo	Argentina	2018–19
All-Star Game	San Lorenzo	Argentina	2019
Sixth Man of the Year	San Lorenzo	Argentina	2019–20
Finals MVP	San Lorenzo	Argentina	2020–21
All-Tournament Team	Boca Juniors	Argentina	2023–24
Finals MVP	Boca Juniors	Argentina	2023–24
Season MVP	Boca Juniors	Argentina	2024–25
All-Tournament Team	Boca Juniors	Argentina	2024–25
Best Argentine player	Boca Juniors	Argentina	2024–25
Finals MVP	Boca Juniors	Argentina	2024–25
