= 2017 Liga Sudamericana de Básquetbol =

Liga Sudamericana de Básquetbol
- Season: 2017
- Dates: 3 October – 15 December 2017
- Games played: 40
- Teams: 16

Regular season
- Season MVP: Heissler Guillént

Finals
- Champions: (Venezuela) Guaros de Lara (1st title)
- Runners-up: (Argentina) Estudiantes Concordia

The 2017 Liga Sudamericana de Básquetbol, or 2017 FIBA South American League, was the 22nd edition of the second-tier level continental professional club basketball competition in the South America, the FIBA South American League. Sixteen teams from across South America competed over three rounds, to determine the champion.

== Team allocation ==
	Teams entering in this round	Teams advancing from previous round
Group phase (16 teams)	16 qualified teams	
Semifinal Phase (8 teams)		4 group winners from the group phase; 4 group runners-up from the group phase
Finals (2 teams)		2 group winners from the semifinal phase

=== Teams ===
Group phase
(Argentina) San Martín de Corrientes (3rd)	(Brazil) Pinheiros (3rd)	(Uruguay) Hebraica Macabi (1st)	(Ecuador) HR Portoviejo (1st)
(Argentina) Quilmes (4th)	(Brazil) Vitória (4th)	(Uruguay) Aguada (2nd)	(Paraguay) Olimpia (1st)
(Argentina) Estudiantes Concordia (5th)	(Brazil) Flamengo (5th)	(Uruguay) Malvín (CW)	(Venezuela) Guaros de Lara (2nd)
(Chile) Osorno (2nd)	(Colombia) Cimarrones (1st)	(Bolivia) Calero (1st)	(Peru) Regatas Lima (1st)

The labels in the parentheses show how each team qualified for the place of its starting round (TH: Americas League title holders):

- LC: Qualified through a licensed club with a long-term licence
- 1st, 2nd, etc.: League position after Playoffs
- CW: Cup winner

== Group phase ==
Sixteen teams participated in the group phase, in which each team faced the other teams in the group once. Each group tournament was held at the arena of a host team. The two highest-placed teams in each group advanced to the semifinal phase. Games were played from 3 to 26 October 2017.

=== Group A ===
Venue: Quibdó, Colombia

Pos	Team	Pld	W	L	PF	PA	PD	Pts	Qualification
1	(Brazil) Flamengo	3	3	0	247	202	+45	6	Advance to semifinal phase
2	(Colombia) Cimmarones (H)	3	2	1	229	228	+1	5	Advance to semifinal phase
3	(Argentina) San Martín de Corrientes	3	1	2	225	220	+5	4	
4	(Uruguay) Hebraica Macabi	3	0	3	192	243	−51	3	

Source: FIBA
(H) Hosts

=== Group B ===
Venue: Montevideo, Uruguay

Pos	Team	Pld	W	L	PF	PA	PD	Pts	Qualification
1	(Brazil) Pinheiros	3	2	1	262	227	+35	5	Advance to semifinal phase
2	(Argentina) Quilmes	3	2	1	262	235	+27	5	Advance to semifinal phase
3	(Uruguay) Aguada (H)	3	2	1	264	224	+40	5	
4	(Chile) Osorno	3	0	3	213	315	−102	3	

Source: FIBA
(H) Hosts

=== Group C ===
Venue: Salvador, Brazil

Pos	Team	Pld	W	L	PF	PA	PD	Pts	Qualification
1	(Venezuela) Guaros de Lara	3	3	0	245	204	+41	6	Advance to semifinal phase
2	(Argentina) Estudiantes Concordia	3	2	1	218	204	+14	5	Advance to semifinal phase
3	(Brazil) Universo/Vitória (H)	3	1	2	205	237	−32	4	
4	(Uruguay) Malvín	3	0	3	194	217	−23	3	

Source: FIBA
(H) Hosts

=== Group D ===
Venue:

Pos	Team	Pld	W	L	PF	PA	PD	Pts	Qualification
1	(Paraguay) Olimpia	3	3	0	266	205	+61	6	Advance to semifinal phase
2	(Peru) Regatas Lima	3	2	1	221	219	+2	5	Advance to semifinal phase
3	(Bolivia) Deportivo Calero	3	1	2	245	251	−6	4	
4	(Ecuador) HR Portoviejo	3	0	3	226	284	−58	3	

Source: FIBA

== Semifinal phase ==
The eight teams which advanced from the group phase, played in this stage in which each team faced the other teams in the group once. Each group tournament was held at the arena of a host team. The highest-placed teams in each group advanced to the Grand Finals. Games were played from 7 to 16 November 2017.

=== Group E ===
Venue: Rio de Janeiro, Brazil

Pos	Team	Pld	W	L	PF	PA	PD	Pts	Qualification
1	(Argentina) Estudiantes Concordia	3	2	1	218	223	−5	5	Advance to Finals
2	(Brazil) Pinheiros	3	2	1	254	215	+39	5	
3	(Paraguay) Olimpia	3	1	2	214	254	−40	4	
4	(Brazil) Flamengo (H)	3	1	2	239	233	+6	4	

Source: FIBA
(H) Hosts

=== Group F ===
Venue: Barquisimeto, Venezuela

Pos	Team	Pld	W	L	PF	PA	PD	Pts	Qualification
1	(Venezuela) Guaros de Lara (H)	3	3	0	251	233	+18	6	Advance to Finals
2	(Argentina) Quilmes	3	1	2	249	238	+11	4	
3	(Colombia) Cimarrones	3	1	2	277	275	+2	4	
4	(Uruguay) Aguada	3	1	2	228	259	−31	4	

Source: FIBA
(H) Hosts

== Grand Finals ==
The Grand Finals were decided in a best-of-five playoff format. Games were played on 6, 7, 13 and 14 December 2017. The team with the better record in the LSB would play Games 1, 2 and 5 (if necessary) at home.

Team 1	Series	Team 2	Game 1	Game 2	Game 3	Game 4
Guaros de Lara (Venezuela)	3–1	(Argentina) Estudiantes Concordia	77–74	88–83	68–74	82–79
