= 2022 Liga Sudamericana de Básquetbol =

25th season of the Liga Sudamericana de Básquetbol

- League: Liga Sudamericana de Básquetbol
- Season: 2022
- Duration: 30 September – 4 December 2022
- Teams: 16

Finals
- Champions: (Brazil) Bauru (2nd title)
- Runners-up: (Argentina) San Martin
- Third place: (Colombia) Titanes de Barranquilla
- Fourth place: (Argentina) Oberá

Awards
- Season MVP: Danilo Fuzaro (Bauru)

The 2022 Liga Sudamericana de Básquetbol, or 2022 FIBA South American Basketball League, was the 25th season of the Liga Sudamericana de Básquetbol (LSB), the second tier of basketball in South America organised by FIBA Americas. It was the first edition since the 2019 season, after the league had a 3-year hiatus due to the COVID-19 pandemic. The season began 30 September 2022 and ended on 4 December 2022 with the Grand Final. The quarter-finals, semi-finals and Grand Final were all hosted in Buenos Aires.

Botafogo was the defending champion, having won the 2019 title, but did not qualify for this season. Bauru won its second LSB championship after defeating San Martín in the Grand Final.

== Team allocation ==
The following teams have been confirmed for the upcoming season:

- 1st, 2nd, etc.: Position in national league
- WC: Wild card

Teams in the 2022 Liga Sudamericana de Básquetbol
(Argentina) San Martín (3rd)	(Brazil) São Paulo (4th)	(Bolivia) Pichincha de Potosí (1st)	(Colombia) Titanes de Barranquilla (1st)
(Argentina) Boca Juniors (5th)	(Brazil) Bauru (5th)	(Uruguay) Aguada (4th)	(Colombia) Tigrillos Medellín (WC)
(Argentina) Regatas Corrientes (6th)	(Brazil) Unifacisa (6th)	(Uruguay) Olimpia (8th)	(Chile) Los Leones de Quilpué (2nd)
(Argentina) Oberá (9th)	(Brazil) Sorocabana (2nd)	(Paraguay) San José (1st)	(Ecuador) Punto Rojo LR (1st)

== Group stage ==
=== Group A ===
The games of Group A were played from 30 September to 2 October 2022 in Barranquilla, Colombia.

Pos	Team	Pld	W	L	PF	PA	PD	Pts	Qualification
1	(Argentina) San Martín	3	2	1	233	210	+23	5 (Note: Titanes de Barranquilla 65–82 San Martín)	Advance to quarterfinals
2	(Colombia) Titanes de Barranquilla (H)	3	2	1	218	185	+33	5	Advance to quarterfinals
3	(Ecuador) Punto Rojo LR	3	1	2	205	221	−16	4 (Note: Sorocabana 60–77 Punto Rojo LR)	
4	(Brazil) Sorocabana	3	1	2	180	220	−40	4	

Source: FIBA
(H) Hosts

=== Group B ===
The games of Group B were played from 7 October to 9 October 2022 in Oberá, Argentina.

Pos	Team	Pld	W	L	PF	PA	PD	Pts	Qualification
1	(Brazil) Bauru	3	2	1	224	186	+38	5 (Note: Head-to-head point difference: Bauru +28, Oberá +2, Regatas Corrientes −30.)	Advance to quarterfinals
2	(Argentina) Oberá (H)	3	2	1	247	205	+42	5	Advance to quarterfinals
3	(Argentina) Regatas Corrientes	3	2	1	224	251	−27	5	
4	(Bolivia) Pichincha de Potosí	3	0	3	220	273	−53	3	

Source: FIBA
(H) Hosts

=== Group C ===
The games of Group C were played from 13 October to 15 October 2022 in Buenos Aires, Argentina.

Pos	Team	Pld	W	L	PF	PA	PD	Pts	Qualification
1	(Argentina) Boca Juniors (H)	3	3	0	223	176	+47	6	Advance to quarterfinals
2	(Uruguay) Aguada	3	2	1	230	206	+24	5	Advance to quarterfinals
3	(Uruguay) Olimpia	3	1	2	209	236	−27	4	
4	(Chile) Los Leones de Quilpué	3	0	3	204	248	−44	3	

Source: FIBA
(H) Hosts

=== Group D ===
The games of Group D were played from 21 October to 24 October in Campina Grande, Brazil.

Pos	Team	Pld	W	L	PF	PA	PD	Pts	Qualification
1	(Brazil) Unifacisa (H)	3	2	1	245	201	+44	5 (Note: Head-to-head point difference: Unifacisa +9, São Paulo −1, San José −8.)	Advance to quarterfinals
2	(Brazil) São Paulo	3	2	1	259	218	+41	5	Advance to quarterfinals
3	(Paraguay) San José	3	2	1	288	234	+54	5	
4	(Colombia) Tigrillos Medellín	3	0	3	191	330	−139	3	

Source: FIBA
(H) Hosts

== Quarterfinals ==
The eight teams that advanced from the group stage will be paired according to their records.

All times are local (GMT-3)

=== Bracket ===
Third round
(Argentina) San Martín ✓	88
(Brazil) Unifacisa	84

Second round
(Argentina) San Martín	85
(Brazil) São Paulo	81
(Argentina) Oberá	72
(Argentina) Boca Juniors	68

First round
(Brazil) Bauru	62
(Colombia) Titanes	82
(Brazil) Unifacisa	75
(Uruguay) Aguada	73
(Argentina) San Martín	56
(Argentina) Oberá	78
(Argentina) Boca Juniors	79
(Brazil) São Paulo	71

Second round
(Colombia) Titanes ✓	75
(Brazil) Unifacisa	69
(Argentina) Oberá ✓	72
(Argentina) Boca Juniors	68

Third round
(Brazil) Bauru ✓	65
(Argentina) Boca Juniors	61

- ✓ indicates a team qualified for the Final Four.

=== First round ===
29 November 2022	Bauru (Brazil)	62–84	(Colombia) Titanes de Barranquilla	Buenos Aires
13:30	Scoring by quarter: 17–27, 14–24, 21–21, 10–12
	Pts: Fuzaro 15; Rebs: Taylor, Rodrigues 4 Asts: Fuzaro, Taylor 3	Boxscore	Pts: Oglivie 23; Rebs: Rodríguez 8 Asts: Zamora 7	Arena: Estadio Obras Sanitarias; Referees: Roberto Vásquez (PUR), Carlos Peralta (ECU), Franco Anselmo (ARG)

29 November 2022	Unifacisa (Brazil)	75–73	(Uruguay) Aguada	Buenos Aires
16:00	Scoring by quarter: 11–21, 24–11, 7–20, 33–21
	Pts: Gaskins 25; Rebs: Hubner 11; Asts: De Oliveira, Góes 2	Boxscore	Pts: Metzger 20; Rebs: Santiso, Vargas 9 Asts: Planells, Santiso 3	Arena: Estadio Obras Sanitarias; Referees: Juan Fernández (ARG), Kristian Páez (ECU), Felipe Ibarra (CHI)

29 November 2022	San Martín (Argentina)	56–78	(Argentina) Oberá	Buenos Aires
18:30	Scoring by quarter: 9–19, 21–16, 17–23, 9–20
	Pts: Basabe 11; Rebs: four players 4 Asts: Solanas 7	Boxscore	Pts: Maldonado 16; Rebs: Carreras, Sandes 7 Asts: Maldonado 7	Arena: Estadio Obras Sanitarias; Referees: Julio Anaya (PAN), Johnny Batista (PUR), Gustavo Mathias (BRA)

29 November 2022	Boca Juniors (Argentina)	79–71	(Brazil) São Paulo	Buenos Aires
21:00	Scoring by quarter: 26–21, 10–21, 24–14, 19–15
	Pts: Balbi 18; Rebs: Balbi, Mata, Mainoldi 8 Asts: Balbi 10	Boxscore	Pts: Ralfi 18; Rebs: Ralfi 12; Asts: four players 2	Arena: Estadio Obras Sanitarias; Referees: Daniel García (VEN), Andrés Bartel (URU), Carlos Vélez (COL)

=== Second round ===
30 November 2022	Aguada (Uruguay)	64–68	(Brazil) Bauru	Buenos Aires
12:30	Scoring by quarter: 18–15, 22–22, 11–13, 13–18
	Pts: Vargas 14; Rebs: Vargas 17; Asts: four players 4	Boxscore	Pts: Gemerson 18; Rebs: Gemerson 10; Asts: Taylor 5	Arena: Estadio Obras Sanitarias; Referees: Julio Anaya (PAN), Johnny Batista (PUR), Carlos Vélez (COL)

30 November 2022	Unifacisa (Brazil)	69–75	(Colombia) Titanes de Barranquilla	Buenos Aires
15:00	Scoring by quarter: 14–31, 19–19, 15–15, 21–10
	Pts: Gaskins 22; Rebs: Hubner 8 Asts: Góes 5	Boxscore	Pts: Rodríguez, Zamora 18; Rebs: Oglivie 9 Asts: Zamora 6	Arena: Estadio Obras Sanitarias; Referees: Juan Fernández (ARG), Daniel García (VEN), Kristian Páez (ECU)

30 November 2022	San Martín (Argentina)	85–81	(Brazil) São Paulo	Buenos Aires
17:30	Scoring by quarter: 13–20, 26–20, 14–22, 32–19
	Pts: Ferreyra 22; Rebs: Basabe 15; Asts: Ferreyra 5	Boxscore	Pts: Bennett 22; Rebs: Ralfi 13; Asts: Elinho 4	Arena: Estadio Obras Sanitarias; Referees: Carlos Peralta (ECU), Andrés Bartel (URU), Felipe Ibarra (CHI)

30 November 2022	Oberá (Argentina)	72–68	(Argentina) Boca Juniors	Buenos Aires
20:00	Scoring by quarter: 17–23, 18–14, 19–15, 18–16
	Pts: Mitchell 25; Rebs: Mitchell 8 Asts: De Los Santos, Maldonado, Sandes 4	Boxscore	Pts: Tucker 13; Rebs: Barber, Mainoldi 9 Asts: Schattmann 4	Arena: Estadio Obras Sanitarias; Referees: Roberto Vásquez (PUR), Gustavo Mathias (BRA), Franco Anselmo (ARG)

=== Third round ===
1 December 2022	San Martín (Argentina)	88–84	(Brazil) Unifacisa	Buenos Aires
17:30	Scoring by quarter: 22–21, 26–16, 21–20, 19–27
	Pts: Solanas 23; Rebs: Basabe 7 Asts: Ferreyra 7	Boxscore	Pts: Gaskins 22; Rebs: Jimmy, Góes 7 Asts: Góes 6	Arena: Estadio Obras Sanitarias; Referees: Daniel García (VEN), Carlos Peralta (ECU), Johnny Batista (PUR)

1 December 2022	Bauru (Brazil)	65–61	(Argentina) Boca Juniors	Buenos Aires
20:30	Scoring by quarter: 15–7, 25–16, 6–22, 19–16
	Pts: Fuzaro 18; Rebs: Gemerson 11; Asts: Garcia 4	Boxscore	Pts: Mata, Mainoldi 13; Rebs: Mata 13; Asts: Mata 5	Arena: Estadio Obras Sanitarias; Referees: Julio Anaya (PAN), Andrés Bartel (URU), Kristian Páez (ECU)

== Final Four ==
=== Bracket ===
Semifinals
3 December
(Argentina) Oberá	69
(Argentina) San Martín	78
3 December
(Colombia) Titanes de Barranquilla	62
(Brazil) Bauru	85

Grand Final
4 December
(Argentina) San Martín	57
(Brazil) Bauru	66
Third place game
4 December
(Argentina) Oberá	84
(Colombia) Titanes de Barranquilla	89

=== Semifinals ===
3 December 2022	Titanes de Barranquilla (Colombia)	62–85	(Brazil) Bauru	Buenos Aires
18:30	Scoring by quarter: 13–20, 16–21, 17–23, 16–21
	Pts: Zamora 17; Rebs: Zamora 9 Asts: Zamora 6	Boxscore	Pts: Gemerson 28; Rebs: Taylor 6 Asts: Taylor 6	Arena: Estadio Obras Sanitarias; Referees: Julio Anaya (PAN), Daniel García (VEN), Johnny Batista (PUR)

3 December 2022	Oberá (Argentina)	69–78	(Argentina) San Martín	Buenos Aires
21:00	Scoring by quarter: 17–20, 15–21, 16–18, 21–19
	Pts: Mitchell 20; Rebs: Mitchell 10; Asts: De Los Santos 5	Boxscore	Pts: Ferreyra 20; Rebs: Basabe 11; Asts: Solanas 6	Arena: Estadio Obras Sanitarias; Referees: Carlos Peralta (ECU), Carlos Vélez (COL), Kristian Páez (ECU)

=== Third place game ===
4 December 2022	Oberá (Argentina)	84–89	(Colombia) Titanes de Barranquilla	Buenos Aires
17:00	Scoring by quarter: 19–25, 15–27, 24–21, 26–16
	Pts: Carreras 20; Rebs: Sandes 9 Asts: De Los Santos, Giorgetti 4	Boxscore	Pts: Oglivie 26; Rebs: Oglivie 8 Asts: Zamora 6	Arena: Estadio Obras Sanitarias; Referees: Daniel García (VEN), Johnny Batista (PUR), Kristian Páez (ECU)

=== Grand Final ===
4 December 2022	San Martín (Argentina)	57–66	(Brazil) Bauru	Buenos Aires
20:00	Scoring by quarter: 20–17, 10–15, 16–27, 11–7
	Pts: Basabe, Ferreyra 12; Rebs: Basabe, Saiz 5 Asts: Basabe 4	Boxscore	Pts: Gemerson 17; Rebs: six players 4 Asts: Garcia 4	Arena: Estadio Obras Sanitarias; Referees: Julio Anaya (PAN), Carlos Peralta (ECU), Carlos Vélez (COL)

== Individual awards ==
The winners of the individual awards were announced after the Grand Final on 4 December.

=== MVP ===
- (Brazil) Danilo Fuzaro (Bauru)

=== All-Tournament Team ===
- G (Brazil) Danilo Fuzaro (Bauru)
- G (Argentina) Santiago Ferreyra (San Martín)
- F (Brazil) Gemerson Silva (Bauru)
- F (Panama) Ernesto Oglivie (Titanes de Barranquilla)
- C (United States) Charles Mitchell (Obéra)
