= 2017–18 Liga Nacional de Básquet season =

Liga Nacional de Básquet
- League: Liga Nacional de Básquet
- Season: 2017–18
- Duration: 20 September 2017 – 2 May 2018 (regular season)
- TV partner(s): TyC Sports; DirecTV Sports

Regular season
- FIBA Americas League: San Lorenzo; San Martín de Corrientes
- Liga Sudamericana: Instituto; San Martín de Corrientes
- Season MVP: (Argentina) Gabriel Deck
- Promoted: Salta Basket; Club Comunicaciones
- Relegated: Salta Basket

Finals
- Champions: San Lorenzo
- Runners-up: San Martín de Corrientes
- Finals MVP: (Argentina) Gabriel Deck

Statistical leaders
- Points: (United States) Maurice Kemp (20.7)
- All statistics correct as of 8 May 2018.

The 2017–18 Liga Nacional de Básquet season is the 34th season of the top professional basketball league in Argentina. The season started on 20 September 2017 with the Torneo Súper 20, which finished on 18 November 2017. The regular season began on 29 November 2017 and finished on 6 May 2018. Starting this season, the competition format underwent significant changes. Instead of two conferences (North and South), all 20 teams are placed in a single group and play a double round-robin, where the best 16 teams at the end of the season qualify for the championship playoffs, while the two teams with the worst record play in a best-of-five relegation series. Before the start of the regular season, the Torneo Súper 20 took place, which awarded two berths to the 2018 Liga Sudamericana de Básquetbol. Salta Basket was relegated after losing the playoff series against Ferro Carril Oeste. San Lorenzo won their third consecutive title, defeating San Martín de Corrientes in the finals.

== Relegation and promotion ==
Torneo Nacional de Ascenso Champions Club Comunicaciones covered the berth left by Atlético Echagüe, who lost the relegation playoffs against Boca Juniors. Libertad conceded their spot due to financial difficulties, and traded places with Salta Basket in the Torneo Nacional de Ascenso, thus ending a streak of 19 seasons in the top flight of Argentine basketball.

== Clubs ==
Team	City	Arena	Capacity
Atenas	Córdoba	Carlos Cerutti	3,730
Bahía Basket	Bahía Blanca	Osvaldo Casanova	3,950
Boca Juniors	Buenos Aires	Luis Conde	2,000
Ciclista Olímpico	La Banda	Luis Conde	2,000
Comunicaciones	Mercedes	Estadio de Comunicaciones	3,500
Estudiantes Concordia	Concordia	Gigante Verde	1,610
Ferro Carril Oeste	Buenos Aires	Estadio Héctor Etchart	4,500
Gimnasia y Esgrima (Comodoro Rivadavia)	Comodoro Rivadavia	Socios Fundadores	2,276
Hispano Americano	Río Gallegos	Estadio Tito Wilson	
Instituto (Córdoba)	Córdoba	Angel Sandrin	2,000
Obras Sanitarias	Buenos Aires	Estadio Obras (Templo del Rock)	3,100
Peñarol	Mar del Plata	Islas Malvinas	8,000
Quilmes	Mar del Plata	Once Unidos	3,000
Quimsa	Santiago del Estero	Estadio Ciudad	5,200
Regatas Corrientes	Corrientes	José Jorge Contte	4,000
Salta Basket	Salta	Polideportivo Delmi	6,000
San Lorenzo	Buenos Aires	Estadio Héctor Etchart	4,500
San Martín de Corrientes	Corrientes	Raúl A. Ortiz	2,500
La Unión	Formosa	Cincuentenario	4,500

== Torneo Súper 20 ==
The inaugural edition of the pre-season tournament Torneo Súper 20 took place between 20 September and 18 November 2017. Four groups of five teams each were formed, and played a double round-robin. The top three teams from each group advanced to the playoff stage directly, while the fourth and fifth teams of each group were paired in four best-of-three series to grant the four remaining berths for the playoff stage. The playoff stage consisted of best-of-three series up to the semifinals, where a final four, single-elimination match format was used. The two teams that reached the final were granted a berth in the 2018 Liga Sudamericana de Básquetbol.

=== First stage ===
==== Group A ====
Pos	Team	Pld	W	L	PCT	Qualification
1	San Martín de Corrientes	8	7	1	.875	Playoffs
2	La Unión	8	6	2	.750	Playoffs
3	Estudiantes Concordia	8	3	5	.375	Playoffs
4	Regatas Corrientes	8	2	6	.250	Repechage
5	Comunicaciones	8	2	6	.250	Repechage

Source: LNB

==== Group B ====
Pos	Team	Pld	W	L	PCT	Qualification
1	Instituto (Córdoba)	8	7	1	.875	Playoffs
2	Salta Basket	8	4	4	.500	Playoffs
3	Ciclista Olímpico	8	3	5	.375	Playoffs
4	Atenas	8	3	5	.375	Repechage
5	Quimsa	8	3	5	.375	Repechage

Source: LNB

==== Group C ====
Pos	Team	Pld	W	L	PCT	Qualification
1	San Lorenzo	8	8	0	1.000	Playoffs
2	Ferro Carril Oeste	8	4	4	.500	Playoffs
3	Hispano Americano	8	3	5	.375	Playoffs
4	Obras Sanitarias	8	3	5	.375	Repechage
5	Boca Juniors	8	2	6	.250	Repechage

Source: LNB

==== Group D ====
Pos	Team	Pld	W	L	PCT	Qualification
1	Gimnasia y Esgrima (Comodoro Rivadavia)	8	5	3	.625	Playoffs
2	Weber Bahía	8	4	4	.500	Playoffs
3	Argentino de Junín	8	4	4	.500	Playoffs
4	Quilmes	8	4	4	.500	Repechage
5	Peñarol	8	3	5	.375	Repechage

Source: LNB

=== Playoffs ===
Repechage
B4	Atenas	2
B5	Quimsa	0
C4	Obras Sanitarias	0
C5	Boca Juniors	2
D4	Quilmes	2
D5	Peñarol	0
A4	Regatas Corrientes	2
A5	Comunicaciones	0

First round
A1	San Martín de Corrientes	2
B4	Atenas	0
B2	Salta Basket	2
3A	Estudiantes Concordia	1
D1	Gimnasia y Esgrima (CR)	2
C5	Boca Juniors	0
C2	Ferro Carril Oeste	2
D3	Argentino de Junín	1
C1	San Lorenzo	2
D4	Quilmes	0
D2	Weber Bahía	2
C3	Hispano Americano	1
B1	Instituto (Córdoba)	2
A4	Regatas Corrientes	0
A2	La Unión	2
B3	Ciclista Olímpico	1

Quarterfinals
A1	San Martín de Corrientes	2
B2	Salta Basket	0
D1	Gimnasia y Esgrima (CR)	2
C2	Ferro Carril Oeste	0
C1	San Lorenzo	2
D2	Weber Bahía	0
B1	Instituto (Córdoba)	2
A2	La Unión	0

Semifinals
A1	San Martín de Corrientes	85
D1	Gimnasia y Esgrima (CR)	83
C1	San Lorenzo	72
B1	Instituto (Córdoba)	82

Final
A1	San Martín de Corrientes	83
B1	Instituto (Córdoba)	74

== Regular season ==
=== League table ===
Pos	Team	Pld	W	L	PCT	Qualification or relegation
1	San Lorenzo	38	30	8	.789	Championship Playoffs
2	San Martín de Corrientes	38	29	9	.763	Championship Playoffs
3	Atenas	38	27	11	.711	Championship Playoffs
4	Instituto (Córdoba)	38	26	12	.684	Championship Playoffs
5	Quimsa	38	24	14	.632	Championship Playoffs
6	La Unión	38	23	15	.605	Championship Playoffs
7	Gimnasia y Esgrima (Comodoro Rivadavia)	38	22	16	.579	Championship Playoffs
8	Obras Sanitarias	38	20	18	.526	Championship Playoffs
9	Weber Bahía	38	18	20	.474	Championship Playoffs
10	Argentino de Junín	38	18	20	.474	Championship Playoffs
11	Hispano Americano	38	16	22	.421	Championship Playoffs
12	Estudiantes Concordia	38	16	22	.421	Championship Playoffs
13	Regatas Corrientes	38	16	22	.421	Championship Playoffs
14	Ciclista Olímpico	38	15	23	.395	Championship Playoffs
15	Boca Juniors	38	15	23	.395	Championship Playoffs
16	Peñarol	38	14	24	.368	Championship Playoffs
17	Quilmes	38	14	24	.368	
18	Comunicaciones	38	13	25	.342	
19	Ferro Carril Oeste	38	13	25	.342	Relegation playoffs
20	Salta Basket	38	11	27	.289	Relegation playoffs

Source: LNB

== Playoffs ==
Playoffs began on 6 May. The relegation series between Ferro Carril Oeste and Salta Basket is set to begin on 9 May.

=== Championship playoffs ===
First round
1	San Lorenzo	3
16	Peñarol	1
8	Obras Sanitarias	3
9	Weber Bahía	0
4	Instituto (Córdoba)	3
13	Regatas Corrientes	0
5	Quimsa	3
12	Estudiantes Concordia	1
2	San Martín de Corrientes	3
15	Boca Juniors	2
7	Gimnasia y Esgrima (CR)	3
10	Argentino de Junín	1
3	Atenas	3
14	Ciclista Olímpico	2
6	La Unión	3
11	Hispano Americano	1

Quarterfinals
1	San Lorenzo	3
8	Obras Sanitarias	1
4	Instituto (Córdoba)	3
5	Quimsa	1
2	San Martín de Corrientes	3
7	Gimnasia y Esgrima (CR)	2
3	Atenas	3
6	La Unión	2

Semifinals
1	San Lorenzo	3
4	Instituto (Córdoba)	2
2	San Martín de Corrientes	3
3	Atenas	0

Championship finals
1	San Lorenzo	4
2	San Martín de Corrientes	2

=== Relegation playoffs ===
Finals
19	Ferro Carril Oeste	3
20	Salta Basket	2

== Clubs in international competitions ==
Team	Competition	Progress
Estudiantes Concordia	FIBA Americas League	Semifinals
Ferro Carril Oeste	FIBA Americas League	Second stage
Regatas Corrientes	FIBA Americas League	Semifinals
San Lorenzo	FIBA Americas League	Champions
Estudiantes Concordia	Liga Sudamericana de Básquetbol	Runners-up
San Martín de Corrientes	Liga Sudamericana de Básquetbol	First round
Quilmes	Liga Sudamericana de Básquetbol	Semifinals

== Awards ==
The regular season awards were presented on 10 May.

=== Yearly Awards ===
- Most Valuable Player: Gabriel Deck, San Lorenzo
- Best Argentine Player: Gabriel Deck, San Lorenzo
- Best Foreign Player: Donald Sims, Atenas
- Sixth Man of the Year: Justin Keenan, San Martín de Corrientes
- Rookie of the Year: Fernando Zurbriggen, Obras Sanitarias
- Most Improved Player: Jonathan Maldonado, La Unión
- Coach of the Year: Sebastián González, San Martín de Corrientes
- All-Tournament Team:
  - F Marcos Mata, San Lorenzo
  - F Gabriel Deck, San Lorenzo
  - C Jerome Meyinsse, Atenas
  - G Dwayne Davis, Instituto (Córdoba)
  - G Donald Sims, Atenas
