= 2016–17 Liga Nacional de Básquet season =

Liga Nacional de Básquet
- League: Liga Nacional de Básquet
- Season: 2016–17
- Duration: 22 September 2016 – 13 May 2017 (regular season)
- Games played: 560 (Regular season); 34–57 (Playoffs)
- TV partner(s): TyC Sports

Regular season
- FIBA Americas League: Regatas Corrientes; San Lorenzo
- Liga Sudamericana: Estudiantes Concordia; San Martín de Corrientes; Quilmes
- Season MVP: (United States) Dar Tucker
- Promoted: Atlético Echagüe; Hispano Americano
- Relegated: Atlético Echagüe

Finals
- Champions: San Lorenzo
- Runners-up: Regatas Corrientes
- Finals MVP: (Argentina) Gabriel Deck

Statistical leaders
- Points: (United States) Dar Tucker (21.7)
- All statistics correct as of 16 July 2017.

The 2016–17 Liga Nacional de Básquet season was the 33rd season of the top professional basketball league in Argentina. The regular season started on 22 September 2016. San Lorenzo won their second title in a row, defeating Regatas Corrientes in the finals.

== Relegation and promotion ==
Torneo Nacional de Ascenso Champions Hispano Americano covered the berth left by Juventud Sionista, who lost the relegation playoffs against Lanús. Lanús, however, withdrew from the League due to financial difficulties and sold its spot. The berth was purchased by Atlético Echagüe, who would be relegated at the end of the season after losing the relegation series against Boca Juniors.

== Clubs ==
Team	City	Arena	Capacity
Atenas	Córdoba	Carlos Cerutti	3,730
Atlético Echagüe	Paraná	Luis Butta	2,300
Bahía Basket	Bahía Blanca	Osvaldo Casanova	3,950
Boca Juniors	Buenos Aires	Luis Conde	2,000
Ciclista Olímpico	La Banda	Luis Conde	2,000
Estudiantes Concordia	Concordia	Gigante Verde	1,610
Ferro Carril Oeste	Buenos Aires	Estadio Héctor Etchart	4,500
Gimnasia y Esgrima (Comodoro Rivadavia)	Comodoro Rivadavia	Socios Fundadores	2,276
Hispano Americano	Río Gallegos	Estadio Tito Wilson	
Instituto (Córdoba)	Córdoba	Angel Sandrin	2,000
Libertad	Sunchales	El Hogar de los Tigres	4,000
Obras Sanitarias	Buenos Aires	Estadio Obras (Templo del Rock)	3,100
Peñarol	Mar del Plata	Islas Malvinas	8,000
Quilmes	Mar del Plata	Once Unidos	3,000
Quimsa	Santiago del Estero	Estadio Ciudad	5,200
Regatas Corrientes	Corrientes	José Jorge Contte	4,000
San Lorenzo	Buenos Aires	Estadio Héctor Etchart	4,500
San Martín de Corrientes	Corrientes	Raúl A. Ortiz	2,500
La Unión	Formosa	Cincuentenario	4,500

== Regular season ==
=== League table ===
==== North Conference ====
Pos	Team	Pld	W	L	PCT	Qualification or relegation
1	San Martín de Corrientes	56	40	16	.714	Conference semifinals
2	Estudiantes Concordia	56	38	18	.679	Conference semifinals
3	Regatas Corrientes	56	34	22	.607	Conference quarterfinals
4	Ciclista Olímpico	56	32	24	.571	Conference quarterfinals
5	Instituto (Córdoba)	56	31	25	.554	Conference quarterfinals
6	Libertad	56	29	27	.518	Conference quarterfinals
7	Quimsa	56	26	30	.464	
8	Atenas	56	23	33	.411	
9	La Unión	56	22	34	.393	
10	Atlético Echagüe	56	8	48	.143	Relegation playoffs

Source: LNB

==== South Conference ====
Pos	Team	Pld	W	L	PCT	Qualification or relegation
1	San Lorenzo	56	40	16	.714	Conference semifinals
2	Ferro Carril Oeste	56	34	22	.607	Conference semifinals
3	Bahía Basket	56	31	25	.554	Conference quarterfinals
4	Argentino de Junín	56	29	27	.518	Conference quarterfinals
5	Gimnasia y Esgrima (Comodoro Rivadavia)	56	28	28	.500	Conference quarterfinals
6	Quilmes	56	26	30	.464	Conference quarterfinals
7	Obras Sanitarias	56	26	30	.464	
8	Peñarol	56	24	32	.429	
9	Hispano Americano	56	22	34	.393	
10	Boca Juniors	56	17	39	.304	Relegation playoffs

Source: LNB

== Playoffs ==
Playoffs are set to begin on 22 May. The relegation series between Boca Juniors and Atlético Echagüe is set to begin on 24 May.

=== Championship playoffs ===
Conference quarterfinals	Conference semifinals
N1	San Martín de Corrientes	3
N4	Ciclista Olímpico	1
N4	Ciclista Olímpico	3
N5	Instituto (Córdoba)	1
North Conference
N2	Estudiantes Concordia	1
N3	Regatas Corrientes	3
N3	Regatas Corrientes	3
N6	Libertad	1
S1	San Lorenzo	3
S5	Gimnasia y Esgrima (CR)	0
S4	Argentino de Junín	1
S5	Gimnasia y Esgrima (CR)	3
South Conference
S2	Ferro Carril Oeste	2
S6	Quilmes	3
S3	Bahía Basket	2
S6	Quilmes	3

Conference Finals
N1	San Martín de Corrientes	1
N3	Regatas Corrientes	3
S1	San Lorenzo	3
S6	Quilmes	0

Championship finals
N3	Regatas Corrientes	1
S1	San Lorenzo	4

=== Relegation playoffs ===
Finals
S10	Boca Juniors	3
N10	Atlético Echagüe	2

== Clubs in international competitions ==
Team	Competition	Progress
La Unión	FIBA Americas League	Group stage
San Lorenzo	FIBA Americas League	Semifinals
Bahía Basket	FIBA Americas League	Runners-up
Ciclista Olímpico	Liga Sudamericana de Básquetbol	Semifinals
Gimnasia y Esgrima (Comodoro Rivadavia)	Liga Sudamericana de Básquetbol	Semifinals
Bahía Basket	Liga Sudamericana de Básquetbol	Runners-up

== Awards ==
The regular season awards were presented on 18 May.

=== Yearly Awards ===
- Most Valuable Player: Dar Tucker, Estudiantes Concordia
- Best Argentine Player: Gabriel Deck, San Lorenzo
- Best Foreign Player: Dar Tucker, Estudiantes Concordia
- Sixth Man of the Year: José Vildoza, Libertad
- Rookie of the Year: Mateo Chiarini, Atenas
- Most Improved Player: Eric Flor, Quilmes
- Coach of the Year: Hernán Laginestra, Estudiantes Concordia
- All-Tournament Team:
  - F Marcos Mata, San Lorenzo
  - F Gabriel Deck, San Lorenzo
  - C Javier Justiz, Estudiantes Concordia
  - G Franco Balbi, Ferro Carril Oeste
  - G Dar Tucker, Estudiantes Concordia

=== Player of the Week ===
Date	Player	Team
3 October	(United States) Dar Tucker	Estudiantes Concordia
10 October	(Argentina) Máximo Fjellerup	Bahía Basket
17 October	(Argentina) Leonardo Mainoldi	San Martín de Corrientes
24 October	(United States) Pete Mickeal	Atenas
31 October	(United States) Justin Williams	Ciclista Olímpico
7 November	(Argentina) Gabriel Deck	San Lorenzo
14 November	(United States) Dennis Horner	Obras Sanitarias
21 November	(Argentina) Marcos Mata	San Lorenzo
28 November	(United States) Donald Sims	Regatas Corrientes
5 December	(Argentina) Luca Vildoza	Quilmes
12 December	(United States) Chaz Crawford	Argentino de Junín
19 December	(Puerto Rico) Ramón Clemente	Ferro Carril Oeste
15 January	(Argentina) Nicolás Gianella	Boca Juniors
22 January	(Argentina) Gabriel Deck	San Lorenzo
29 January	(Argentina) Gabriel Deck	San Lorenzo
5 February	(United States) Rodney Green	Instituto (Córdoba)
12 February	(United States) Dar Tucker	Bahía Basket
19 February	(Argentina) Leonardo Mainoldi	San Martín de Corrientes
26 February	(United States) Rodney Green	Instituto (Córdoba)
5 March	(Argentina) Federico Van Lacke	Ciclista Olímpico
12 March	(United States) Jerome Meyinsse	San Lorenzo
19 March	(Argentina) Walter Herrmann	Obras Sanitarias
26 March	(Argentina) Emiliano Basabe	Argentino de Junín
2 April	(United States) Justin Williams	Ciclista Olímpico
9 April	(Argentina) Franco Balbi	Ferro Carril Oeste
16 April	(Cuba) Javier Justiz	Estudiantes Concordia
23 April	(Argentina) Lucio Redivo	Bahía Basket
30 April	(Argentina) Gabriel Deck	San Lorenzo

=== Player of the Month ===
Month	Player	Team
October	(United States) Dar Tucker	Estudiantes Concordia
November	(United States) Dar Tucker	Estudiantes Concordia
December	(United States) Chaz Crawford	Argentino de Junín
January	(United States) Jeremiah Wood	San Martín de Corrientes
February	(United States) Dar Tucker	Estudiantes Concordia
March	(United States) Dar Tucker	Estudiantes Concordia
