= Charles Mitchell (basketball) =

American basketball player

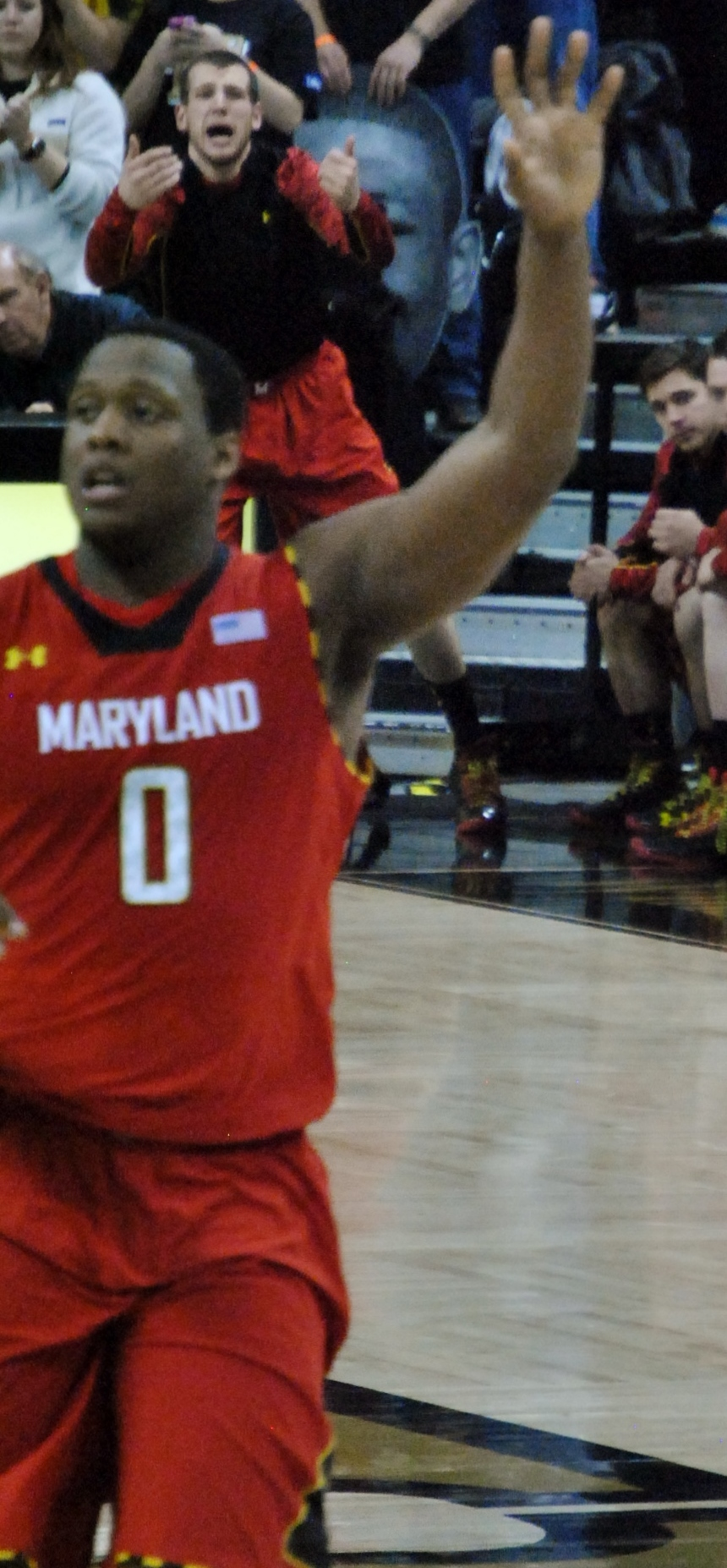
- Mitchell with Maryland

No. 21 – Gambusinos de Fresnillo
- Position: Power forward / center
- League: Liga Nacional de Baloncesto Profesional

Personal information
- Born: October 23, 1993 (age 32) Marietta, Georgia
- Listed height: 6 ft 8 in (2.03 m)
- Listed weight: 268.4 lb (122 kg)

Career information
- High school: Joseph Wheeler
- College: Maryland (2012–2014); Georgia Tech (2014–2016)
- NBA draft: 2016: undrafted
- Playing career: 2016–present

Career history
- 2016–2017: Den Bosch
- 2017–2018: Olomoucko
- 2018–2019: Ferro
- 2019–2020: Bank of Taiwan
- 2020–2021: Nacional
- 2021: Dorados de Chihuahua
- 2022: Dorados de Chihuahua
- 2022: Regatas Corrientes
- 2022–2023: Oberá
- 2023: Urunday Universitario
- 2023–2024: Oberá
- 2024–2026: Dorados de Chihuahua
- 2026–present: Gambusinos de Fresnillo

Career highlights
- All-LSB Team (2022); LSB scoring champion (2022); DBL rebounding leader (2017)

Charles Mitchell (born October 23, 1993) is an American basketball player who last played for Dorados de Chihuahua. He typically plays as either a power forward or as a center, and has played professionally in Taiwan, the Netherlands, the Czech Republic, Uruguay, Mexico, and Argentina.

== Early life ==
Mitchell is from Marietta, Georgia and was born on October 23, 1993, one of three children of Harriett Mitchell. He attended Joseph Wheeler High School, graduating in 2012.

== College career ==
Mitchell began his collegiate career at Maryland. As a sophomore, he averaged 6.5 points and 6.3 rebounds per game. Following the season he transferred to the Georgia Institute of Technology to be closer to his ailing grandmother, and he played for its Yellow Jackets basketball team. He averaged 10.1 points and 9.7 rebounds per game as a senior before graduating in 2016.

== Professional career ==
Mitchell began his professional basketball career with the Dutch basketball team Den Bosch in late 2016. He played for Den Bosch until 2017. Mitchell played for the Argentine basketball team Ferro in 2018 and the Czech basketball team BK Olomoucko from 2017 to 2018.

On September 17, 2019, Mitchell signed with Bank of Taiwan of Super Basketball League (SBL). Mitchell averaged 18.5 points, 12 rebounds, 2.7 assists and 1.7 steals in 30 games.

On June 11, 2020, Mitchell signed with Niigata Albirex BB of the B.League. On October 9, 2020, his contract was terminated due to medical examination. On October 31, 2020, Mitchell signed with Nacional of the Liga Uruguaya de Básquetbol.

In 2022, Mitchell played for the Argentine club Oberá Tenis Club. He also played in the 2022 Liga Sudamericana de Básquetbol, where he averaged 18.1 points per game, the most in the league. After the tournament, Mitchell was named to the All-Tournament Team.
