= Diego Ciorciari =

Argentine-Italian basketball player

Personal information
- Born: March 2, 1980 (age 46) Santa Fe, Argentina
- Listed height: 6 ft 1 in (1.85 m)

Career information
- Playing career: 1998–2018
- Position: Point guard

Career history

Playing
- 1998–2002: Ferro Carril Oeste (Argentina)
- 2002: Arkadia Traiskirchen (Austria)
- 2002: De Vizia Avellino (Italy)
- 2002–2003: Vip Rimini (Italy)
- 2003–2004: CAI Zaragoza (Spain)
- 2004–2005: Bilbao Basket (Spain)
- 2005–2006: Calpe Aguas (Spain)
- 2006–2007: Leche Río Breogán (Spain)
- 2007–2009: Melilla Baloncesto (Spain)
- 2009–2011: Menorca Bàsquet (Spain)
- 2011: Otto Caserta (Italy)
- 2011–2013: Gimnasia y Esgrima (CR) (Argentina)
- 2013: Cangrejeros de Santurce (Puerto Rico)
- 2013–2014: Libertad de Sunchales (Argentina)
- 2014–2016: San Martín de Corrientes (Argentina)
- 2016–2017: Instituto ACC (Argentina)
- 2017–2018: Hispano Americano (Argentina)

Coaching
- 2022–2023: San Pablo Burgos (assistant)

Career highlights
- Copa Príncipe de Asturias champion (2004)
Medals
Representing Argentina
Men's Basketball
FIBA U21 World Championship
Bronze medal – third place	2001 Saitama	National Team

Diego Andrés Ciorciari (born 2 March 1980) is an Argentine professional basketball coach and former player who played at the point guard position. He is assistant coach for San Pablo Burgos of the Spanish LEB Oro.

== Early years ==
He began to play basketball in an amateur club called Rivadavia Juniors, in his home city, Santa Fe.

== Professional career ==
Ciorciari first started to play as a professional in Argentina in 1997, when he was only 17, playing for Ferro Carril Oeste with Luis Scola and Federico Kammerichs among others. Because he was the youngest player of the team, the speaker nicknamed him El 'pichón' Ciorciari, being pichón a baby bird. Despite his height, in 2001 he won the LNB Slam Dunk Contest against Walter Herrmann, after having lost the final the year before.

Afterwards he moved to Austria, where he played only for two months before he moved to Italy, where he played in Serie A and Legadue. In 2003 he signed for CAI Zaragoza, of Spanish second division LEB, and on 4 November 2004 he made his debut in ACB with Bilbao Basket. From 2005 to 2010 he played in the LEB league in different teams, and in May 2010 he won the LEB Play-off with Menorca basket and promoted to ACB.

Unfortunately, his team relegated to the second division and he decided to leave the LEB after 7 seasons in Spain. In 2011, Diego moved to Italy and started playing for Pepsi Caserta but at the end of the year he returned to Argentina after almost ten years abroad and joined Club Gimnasia y Esgrima (Comodoro Rivadavia)

== Coaching career ==
Following retirement, he has started his coaching career by becoming assistant coach for San Pablo Burgos of the Spanish LEB Oro.
