= 2019 FIBA Americas League =

FIBA Americas League
- Season: 2019
- Dates: 18 January – 31 March 2019
- Games played: 40
- Teams: 16

Finals
- Champions: (Argentina) San Lorenzo (2nd title)
- Runners-up: (Venezuela) Guaros de Lara
- Third place: (Brazil) Paulistano
- Fourth place: (Mexico) Capitanes de la Ciudad de México

Awards
- Grand Final MVP: (Jordan) Dar Tucker

The 2019 FIBA Americas League was the 12th edition of the top-tier level intercontinental professional club basketball competition in the Americas and last for the FIBA Americas League. Sixteen teams from across the Americas competed over three rounds, to determine the champion.

San Lorenzo won its second continental title, giving them the right to play in the 2020 FIBA Intercontinental Cup.

== Team allocation ==
	Teams entering in this round	Teams advancing from previous round
Group phase (16 teams)	16 qualified teams	
Semifinal Phase (8 teams)		4 group winners from the group phase; 4 group runners-up from the group phase
Final Four (4 teams)		2 group winners from the semifinal phase; 2 group runners-up from the semifinal phase

=== Teams ===
Group phase
(Argentina) San Lorenzo ^{TH} (1st)	(Brazil) Mogi das Cruzes (2nd)	(Mexico) Soles de Mexicali (1st)	(Puerto Rico) Capitanes de Arecibo (1st)
(Argentina) San Martín de Corrientes (2nd)	(Brazil) Franca ^{LSC}	(Mexico) Capitanes de la Ciudad de México (2nd)	(Puerto Rico) Leones de Ponce (4th)
(Argentina) Atenas (3rd)	(Chile) Las Animas (1st)	(Mexico) Libertadores de Querétaro (WC)	(Uruguay) Malvín (1st)
(Brazil) Paulistano (1st)	(Colombia) Titanes de Barranquilla (1st)	(Nicaragua) Real Estelí	(Venezuela) Guaros de Lara (1st)

The labels in the parentheses show how each team qualified for the place of its starting round:

- 1st, 2nd, etc.: League position after Playoffs
- TH: Americas League title holders
- LSC: Liga Sudamericana winners
- WC: Qualified through Wild Card

Notes

Note Wild Cards (WC): As Panamanian champions Universitarios declined to participate, FIBA invited Libertadores de Querétaro to the competition.

== Group phase ==
Sixteen teams participated in the group phase, in which each team faced the other teams in the group once. Each group tournament was held at the arena of a host team. The two highest-placed teams in each group advance to the semifinal phase. Games were played from 18 January until 10 February 2019.

=== Group A ===
Venue: São Paulo, Brazil

Pos	Team	Pld	W	L	PF	PA	PD	Pts	Qualification
1	(Brazil) Paulistano (H)	3	3	0	262	180	+82	6	Advance to semifinal phase
2	(Argentina) Atenas	3	1	2	217	227	−10	4	Advance to semifinal phase
3	(Uruguay) Malvín	3	1	2	214	253	−39	4	
4	(Colombia) Titanes de Barranquilla	3	1	2	231	284	−53	4	

Source: FIBA
(H) Hosts

=== Group B ===
Venue: Mexico City, Mexico

Pos	Team	Pld	W	L	PF	PA	PD	Pts	Qualification
1	(Brazil) Franca	3	3	0	285	224	+61	6	Advance to semifinal phase
2	(Mexico) Capitanes (H)	3	2	1	254	246	+8	5	Advance to semifinal phase
3	(Mexico) Soles de Mexicali	3	1	2	225	249	−24	4	
4	(Nicaragua) Real Estelí	3	0	3	235	280	−45	3	

Source: FIBA
(H) Hosts

=== Group C ===
Venue: Valdivia, Chile

Pos	Team	Pld	W	L	PF	PA	PD	Pts	Qualification
1	(Argentina) San Lorenzo	3	3	0	267	207	+60	6	Advance to semifinal phase
2	(Chile) Las Animas (H)	3	2	1	252	271	−19	5	Advance to semifinal phase
3	(Argentina) San Martín de Corrientes	3	1	2	211	215	−4	4	
4	(Brazil) Mogi das Cruzes	3	0	3	254	291	−37	3	

Source: FIBA
(H) Hosts

=== Group D ===
Venue: Ponce, Puerto Rico

Pos	Team	Pld	W	L	PF	PA	PD	Pts	Qualification
1	(Venezuela) Guaros de Lara	3	3	0	259	245	+14	6	Advance to semifinal phase
2	(Puerto Rico) Capitanes de Arecibo	3	2	1	261	252	+9	5	Advance to semifinal phase
3	(Mexico) Libertadores de Querétaro	3	1	2	272	287	−15	4	
4	(Puerto Rico) Leones de Ponce (H)	3	0	3	281	289	−8	3	

Source: FIBA
(H) Hosts

== Semifinal phase ==
The eight teams which advance from the group phase, played in this stage in which each team faced the other teams in the group once. Each group tournament was held at the arena of a host team. The two highest-placed teams in each group advance to the final four. Games were played from 8 March until 17 March 2019.

=== Group E ===
Venue: Franca, Brazil

Pos	Team	Pld	W	L	PF	PA	PD	Pts	Qualification
1	(Brazil) Paulistano	3	3	0	275	231	+44	6	Advance to Final Four
2	(Mexico) Capitanes de la Ciudad de México	3	2	1	253	246	+7	5	Advance to Final Four
3	(Brazil) Franca (H)	3	1	2	255	243	+12	4	
4	(Argentina) Atenas	3	0	3	219	282	−63	3	

Source: FIBA
(H) Hosts

=== Group F ===
Venue: Buenos Aires, Argentina

Pos	Team	Pld	W	L	PF	PA	PD	Pts	Qualification
1	(Venezuela) Guaros de Lara	3	3	0	245	209	+36	6	Advance to Final Four
2	(Argentina) San Lorenzo (H)	3	2	1	241	181	+60	5	Advance to Final Four
3	(Puerto Rico) Capitanes de Arecibo	3	1	2	228	254	−26	4	
4	(Chile) Las Animas	3	0	3	186	256	−70	3	

Source: FIBA
(H) Hosts

== Final Four ==
The final four tournament decided the champion of the 2019 season. The tournament was held from 30 March and 31 March 2019 in the Polideportivo Roberto Pando in Buenos Aires, Argentina.

Semifinals
30 March
(Brazil) Paulistano	58
(Argentina) San Lorenzo	76
30 March
(Venezuela) Guaros de Lara	81
(Mexico) Capitanes de la Ciudad de México	66

Grand Final
31 March
(Argentina) San Lorenzo	64
(Venezuela) Guaros de Lara	61
Third place
31 March
(Brazil) Paulistano	100
(Mexico) Capitanes de la Ciudad de México	78
