= San Lorenzo de Almagro (basketball) =

Basketball team in Buenos Aires, Argentina

San Lorenzo
- Nickname: Azulgrana
- Conference: Sur
- Leagues: LNB; Champions League Americas
- Founded: 1935; 91 years ago (Basketball section)
- Arena: Polideportivo Roberto Pando
- Capacity: 2,700
- Location: Buenos Aires, Argentina
- Team colors
- President: Marcelo Moretti
- Head coach: Sebastián Burtin
- Championships: 2 FIBA Americas League; 5 Argentine Leagues; 1 Argentine Club Championship; 1 Súper 4
- Website: sanlorenzo.com.ar/basquet
Home	Away

San Lorenzo de Almagro Básquet is the men's professional club basketball section of the homonymous sports club based in Buenos Aires, Argentina. The team plays in the Liga Nacional de Básquet (LNB), which is the first division of the Argentine basketball league system, and Pan-America's premier men's basketball league, the Basketball Champions League Americas. Their home arena is the Estadio Ciudad de Santiago del Estero. The team is currently coached by Silvio Santander.

In the period 1942-1973, he stood out for what he did at the amateur and semi-amateur level, in which he won 29 regional titles, won the Argentine Club Championship, and was South American runner-up in 1958. In addition, he was one of the founding clubs of the National League, playing the opening game of said tournament on April 26, 1985. Although the club is known mainly for its soccer part, it is also one of the most important basketball clubs in the country and South America, being a multi-champion at various times in its history. He has to his credit five Leagues (2015-16, 2016-17, 2017-18, 2018-19 and 2020-21), two Liga de las Américas, and other titles such as a Super 4, and two Super Cups. San Lorenzo is the first, and so far, the only Argentine basketball team to face an NBA team. It is the only club that has been four-time and five-time champion of the National League.

== History ==
=== Beginning and golden years ===
San Lorenzo affiliated to the Argentine Association in the 1930s decade, and won a large number of championships from the 1930s to the 1970s, being nicknamed The Cathedral of Basketball. 1942 was the year when San Lorenzo achieved its first titles, winning the Torneo Apertura (Opening Tournament) and the Official championship, organised by the Buenos Aires Basketball Association. One year later, the team won another Apertura title, and they then won the 1946, 1949, and 1950 Apertura official titles. The club's most notable players of that era were Alfredo Belli, Salvador Capece, and Alberto Trama. Other notable members of the team were Armando Bo and Francisco Sommariva.

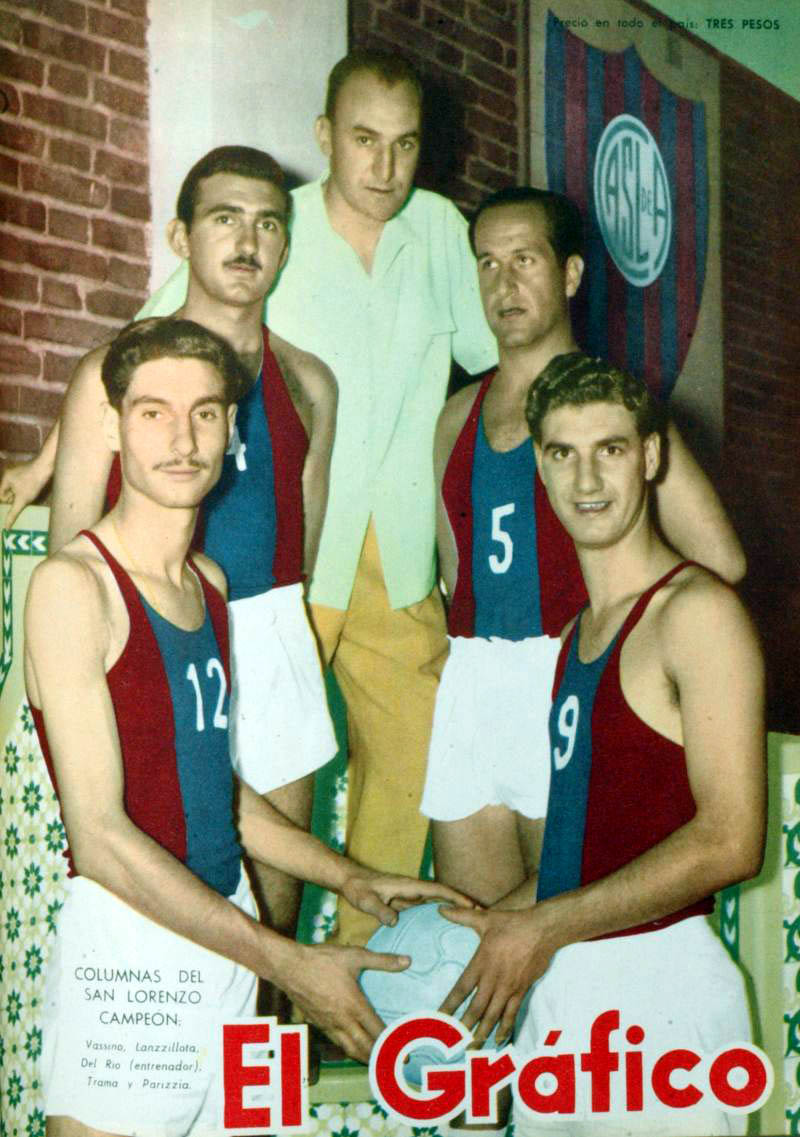
The 1956 champions posing for El Gráfico

In 1951, San Lorenzo played against The Harlem Globetrotters, at the Estadio Luna Park, in Buenos Aires. That same year, the team won the Apertura championship (and repeated again in 1952), and the Official in 1954. Two years later, the team won another Official title, remaining unbeaten, and its first Torneo Metropolitano (Metropolitan Tournament) title. In 1957, San Lorenzo made its first international tour of Brazil, where the squad won 8 of 12 games played. Players on the tour were: Ricardo Lanzillotta (team captain), Herberto Fagnani, Edgar Parizzia, Oscar Zagatti, Carlos Vasino, Vicente Lazzara, Erio Cassetai, and Carlos Marranzino, with Francisco del Río being the head coach of the team.

San Lorenzo won its first national title in 1958, the Campeonato Argentino (Argentine Championship of Clubs). That allowed the team to play its first official tournament outside of Argentina, as the club competed in the South American top-tier level South American Championship of Champions Clubs, where San Lorenzo finished second, behind Defensor Sporting. At the Argentine national domestic level, San Lorenzo won the 1958 Apertura title, and finished third in the Buenos Aires championship (although the squad won the 1959 and 1960 titles). In 1966, San Lorenzo won the Apertura title finishing unbeaten, and both the Metropolitano and Buenos Aires championships, in 1968.

=== European tour ===
The 1970s began with the 1970 Metropolitano championship, and the club then winning two titles else in 1971. That same year, San Lorenzo toured in Europe, marking the first time that an Argentine team played there. The club's layers were Oscar Visciglia, Gustavo Aguirre, Carlos Perroni, Carlos Garro, Dante Massolini, Norberto Pacheco, Carlos Perales, Abel Rojas, Néstor Delgui, and Emilio Dumani, with Edgard Parizzia acting as the team's head coach. San Lorenzo defeated OKK Beograd, Yugoslavian national league club, and six rivals from Italy. They also played against the Spain national team. During that tour, the team was nicknamed, La Catedral (The cathedral), after a speech from team player Emilio Dumani, saying: "This is a team that always fights, and never turns off... like the lights of a Cathedral".

Note: Wins are highlighted in bold

1971 tour of Europe details
Date	Country	City	Rival	Result
30 Apr	Spain	Balaguer	Spain	49–94
1 May	Spain	Balaguer	(United States) Gillette	73–75
2 May	Spain	Balaguer	(Serbia) OKK Beograd	**78–74**
6 May	Italy	Bari	(Serbia) OKK Beograd	88–89
7 May	Italy	Bari	(Italy) Fides Napoli	63–93
8 May	Italy	Bari	(Italy) Tropicali Pesaro	70–72
9 May	Italy	Roseto	(Italy) Monti Roseto	**90–69**
12 May	Italy	Rome	(Italy) Patriarca	**89–80**
14 May	Italy	Reggio Emilia	(Italy) La Torre Reggio Emilia	**81–57**
15 May	Italy	Brugherio	(Italy) Candy	70–74
16 May	Italy	Turin	(Italy) Riber	**94–79**
17 May	Italy	Genoa	(Italy) Athletic Genova	**75–63**
19 May	Italy	Rome	(Italy) Lazio Snadiero	**93–85**

Despite those successful years, the 1973 Buenos Aires championship was their last title until the 2010s.

=== Liga Nacional and decline ===
On April 26, 1985, San Lorenzo played the opening game of the recently created Liga Nacional de Básquet (LNB) (National Basketball League), facing Argentino de Firmat at the Obras Sanitarias venue. Nevertheless, the team was relegated that same year.

The basketball section of the club was inactive between 1986 and 1993, returning only at youth levels. In 1996, San Lorenzo's senior squad returned to first division tournaments of the city of Buenos Aires. The club also won the Under-22 championship (2004), and the 2012 Copa De Oyarbide (Oyarbide Cup).

=== Return to glory ===
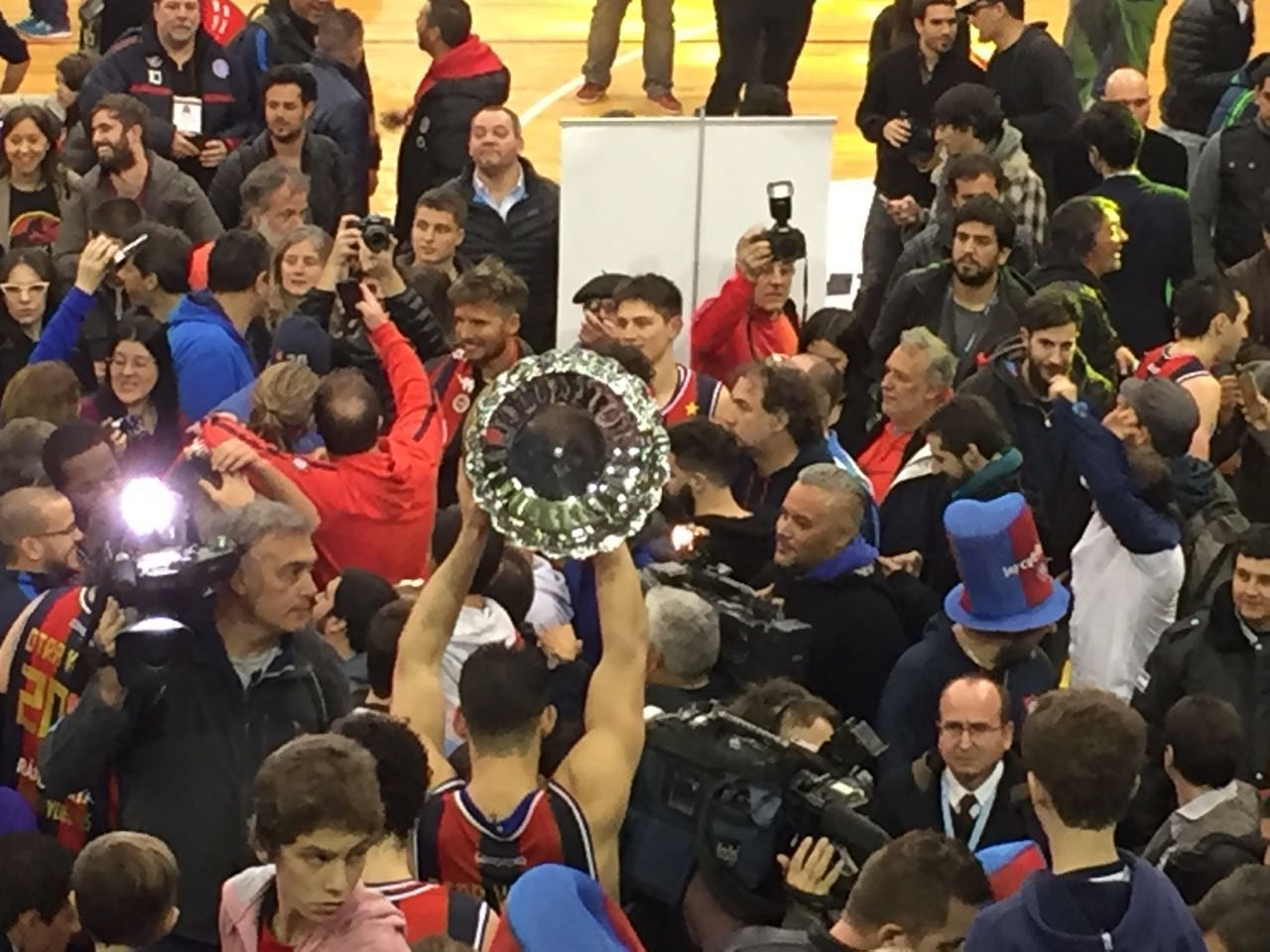
San Lorenzo players celebrating the 2015–16 season LNB title.

In 2014, San Lorenzo debuted in the Torneo Nacional de Ascenso (TNA) (National Promotion Tournament), the second tier level division of professional basketball in Argentina. In 2015, San Lorenzo acquired a vacant place in the Argentine top-tier level Liga Nacional de Básquet (LNB) (National Basketball League), because of a merger with the club 9 de Julio de Río Tercero. 30 years after its debut in the LNB, San Lorenzo returned to the top division on September 22, 2015, and beat Quimsa, by a score of 79–64.

San Lorenzo won its first LNB title in 2016, after beating La Unión, with a 4–0 series sweep in the league's finals. San Lorenzo player, Walter Herrmann, was chosen as MVP of the Finals.

In the following season, San Lorenzo won its 2nd consecutive Argentine League title, after defeating Regatas Corrientes, 4–1 at the finals. The team became the most winning team in the LNB's history, with a 23–3 record. Gabriel Deck was chosen as the Final's MVP. Unlike the 2015–16 series, San Lorenzo played its home games at Roberto Pando arena, in Boedo, Buenos Aires.

== Arena ==
San Lorenzo plays its home games at the Polideportivo Roberto Pando, which is located in Boedo, Buenos Aires. The arena has a seating capacity of 2,700 people.

== Players ==
=== Current roster ===
San Lorenzo roster
Players
Coaches

Pos.	No.	Nat.	Name	Ht.		Age
G	3	(Argentina)	Alonso, Augusto	1.87 m (6 ft 2 in)		27 – 12 May 1998
G	4	(Argentina)	Perez, Lucas	1.85 m (6 ft 1 in)		38 – 18 December 1987
PF	5	(Argentina)	Nesci, Valentino	2.02 m (6 ft 8 in)		21 – 5 March 2004
SG	8	(Argentina)	Latorre, Lucas	1.83 m (6 ft 0 in)		23 – 28 August 2002
SG	9	(Argentina)	Sanchez, Alejo	1.92 m (6 ft 4 in)		35 – 6 July 1990
F	10	(Argentina)	Villarroel, Iván	1.90 m (6 ft 3 in)		21 – 28 October 2004
G	11	(Argentina)	Barrios, Lautaro	1.83 m (6 ft 0 in)		21 – 18 September 2004
G	12	(Argentina) (Italy)	Rutenberg, Facundo	1.90 m (6 ft 3 in)		25 – 6 January 2001
SG	15	(Argentina) (Syria)	Safar, Selem	1.92 m (6 ft 4 in)	94 kg (207 lb)	38 – 6 May 1987
SF	17	(Argentina)	Cardo, Cristian	1.98 m (6 ft 6 in)		27 – 17 January 1999
PF/C	18	(Argentina)	Bednarek, Ignacio	2.04 m (6 ft 8 in)		23 – 19 March 2002
C	35	(Argentina)	Nally, Tomàs	2.04 m (6 ft 8 in)		23 – 16 October 2002

Head coach

- (Argentina) Gonzalo García

Legend

- (C) Team captain
- Injured

- Roster
Updated: 2020–01–01

=== Notable players ===
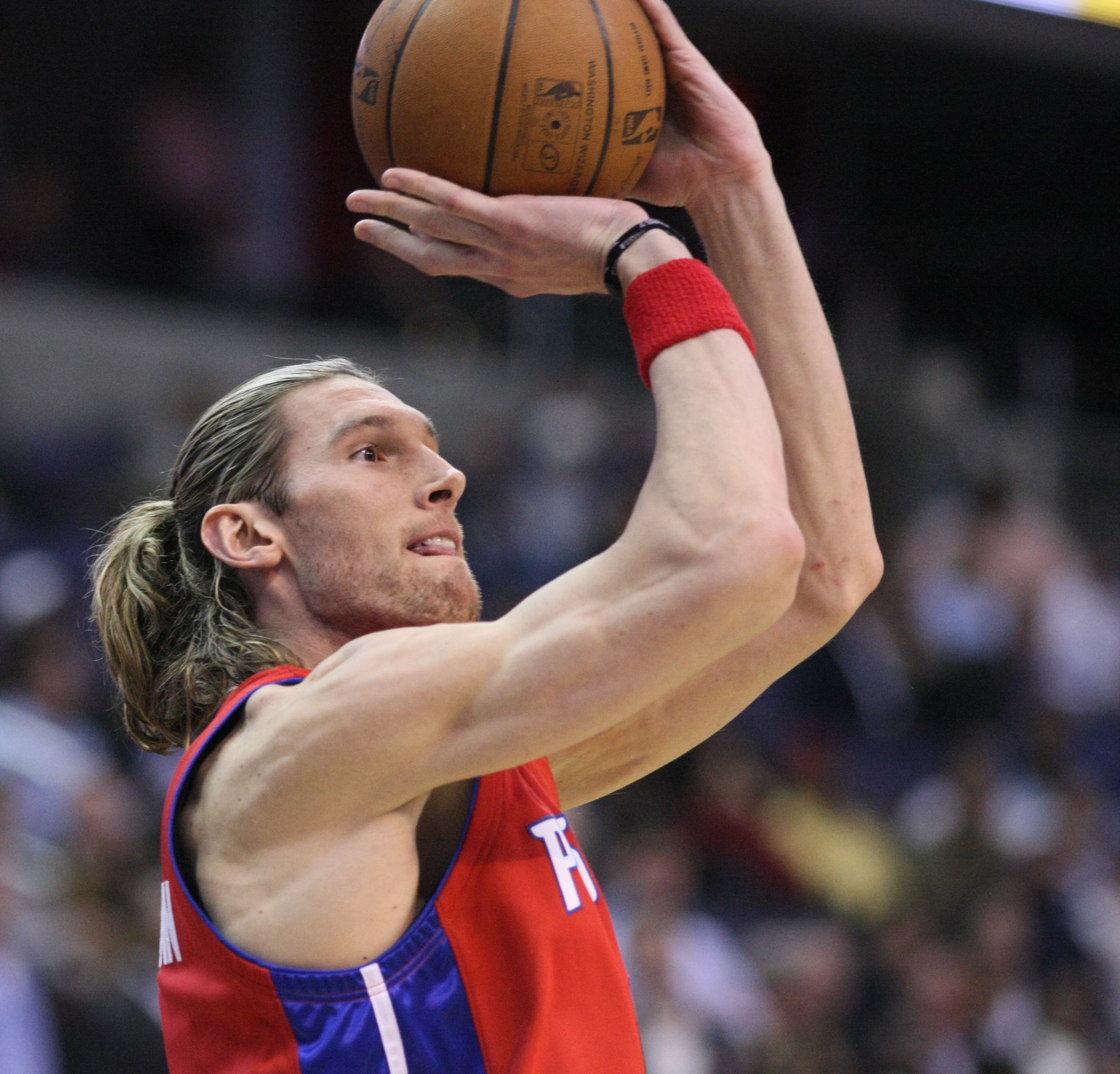
Walter Herrmann, the club's key player of their Argentine LNB 2015–16 season title.

Note: Flags indicate national team eligibility at FIBA-sanctioned events. Players may hold other non-FIBA nationalities not displayed.

Criteria

To appear in this section a player must have either:

- Set a club record or won an individual award while at the club
- Played at least one official international match for their national team at any time
- Played at least one official NBA match at any time.

- (Argentina) Román González
- (Argentina) Walter Herrmann
- (Argentina) Nicolás Aguirre
- (Argentina) Marcos Mata
- (Argentina) Gabriel Deck
- (Argentina) Selem Safar
- (Argentina) Matías Sandes
- (Argentina) Máximo Fjellerup
- (Uruguay) Mathías Calfani
- (Cuba) Javier Justiz Ferrer
- (Puerto Rico) Guillermo Díaz
- (United States) DeJuan Blair
- (United States) Jerome Meyinsse
- (United States) Donald Sims
- (Canada) Joel Anthony
- (United Kingdom) Matthew Bryan-Amaning
- (Spain) Juan Domingo de la Cruz
- (Nigeria) Gani Lawal
- (Jordan) Dar Tucker
- (Lithuania) Tautvydas Lydeka

== Head coaches ==
- (Argentina) Oscar Rigiroli
- (Argentina) Elpidio Pertuzzo
- (Argentina) José Biggi
- (Argentina) Francisco Del Rio
- (Argentina) Alberto Trama
- (Argentina) José Bellino
- (Argentina) Edgar Parizzia
- (Argentina) Julio Lamas
- (Argentina) Gonzalo García

== Statistics ==
=== Games versus NBA and European-wide league teams ===
==== Versus NBA teams ====
14 October 2016	Toronto Raptors (Canada)	122–105	(Argentina) San Lorenzo	Air Canada Centre, Toronto, Canada
	Scoring by quarter: 32–22, 21–33, 34–27, 35–23
	Pts: VanVleet 31; Rebs: Poeltl 6 Asts: VanVleet, Heslip 5	Game Report; Box Score	Pts: 22 Meyinsse; Rebs: 7 Aguirre, Mata; Asts: 11 Aguirre	Attendance: 15,113; Referees: Pat Fraher, Lauren Holtkamp, Scott Wall

7 October 2019	Cleveland Cavaliers (United States)	120–89	(Argentina) San Lorenzo	Rocket Mortgage FieldHouse, Cleveland, Ohio
	Scoring by quarter: 21–24, 43–29, 26–21, 30–15
	Pts: Clarkson 17; Rebs: Thompson 10; Asts: Osman 5	Game Report; Box Score	Pts: 20 Batista; Rebs: 11 J. Williams; Asts: 7 Aguirre	Attendance: 9,902; Referees: Brent Barnaky, Ken Mauer, Phenizee Ransom

==== Versus EuroLeague teams (Tier 1) ====
12 September 2017	Real Madrid (Spain)	81–84	(Argentina) San Lorenzo	Ciudad Deportiva Príncipe Felipe, Madrid, Spain
	Scoring by quarter: 19–26, 23–15, 26–18, 13–25
	Pts: Campazzo 16	Game Report	Pts: 25 Tucker	Attendance: 150; Referees: Fernández, Zamorano, Serrano

15 September 2017	Barcelona (Spain)	85–95	(Argentina) San Lorenzo	Pabellón de Balaguer, Balaguer, Catalonia, Spain
	Scoring by quarter: 19–31, 20–25, 23–19, 23–20
	Pts: Moerman 21; Rebs: Moerman 5 Asts: Heurtel 7	Game Report	Pts: 23 Deck; Rebs: 14 Deck; Asts: 4 Mata	Referees: O. Perea, J. Oyón, V. Mas

==== Versus FIBA Saporta Cup teams (Tier 2) ====
7 May 1971	San Lorenzo (Argentina)	63–93	(Italy) Fides Napoli	Bari, Italy
		Game Report

==== Versus FIBA Champions League teams (Tier 2) ====
15 February 2019	San Lorenzo (Argentina)	64–86	(Greece) AEK Athens	Rio de Janeiro, Brazil

== Honours ==
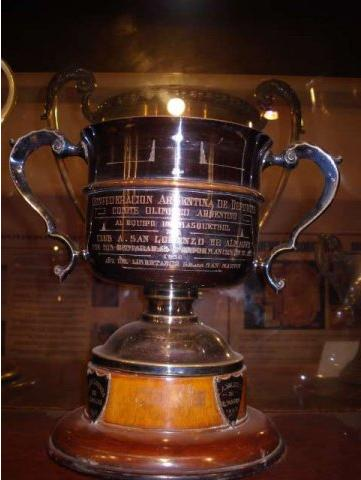
Copa Confederación Argentina de Deportes (Argentine Sports Confederation Cup).

=== National ===
- Campeonato Argentino de Clubes (1): 1958
- Liga Nacional de Básquet (5): 2015–16, 2016–17, 2017–18, 2018–19, 2020-21
- Torneo Súper 4 (1): 2016–17

=== Regional ===
- Asociación de Buenos Aires Championship (12): 1942, 1946, 1949, 1950, 1954, 1956, 1957, 1959, 1960, 1968, 1971, 1973
- Torneo Metropolitano (5): 1956, 1967, 1968, 1979, 1971

=== International ===
- Liga de las Américas (2): 2018, 2019

=== Others ===
- Arganda del Rey, Spain Invitational Game: 2017

== In international competitions ==
=== Latin America ===
Champions Runners-up Third place Fourth place

Year	Competition	Round	W	L	W%
2017	FIBA Americas League	Second Group Stage	4	2	.667
2018	FIBA Americas League	Champions	8	0	1.000
2019	FIBA Americas League	Champions	7	1	.875
2019–20	BCL Americas	Semifinals	7	3	.700
2021	BCL Americas	Quarterfinals	4	1	.800
2024	FIBA South American League	Runners-up	4	2	.667
Total	2 Titles		34	9	.791

=== FIBA Intercontinental Cup ===
Champions Runners-up Third place Fourth place

Year	Round	W	L	W%
(Brazil) 2019	Third place	1	1	.500
(Spain) 2020	Third place	1	1	.500
Total	0 Titles	2	2	.500

== See also ==
- San Lorenzo de Almagro
