= Punto Rojo LR =

- League: Liga Ecuatoriana de Baloncesto; Liga Sudamericana de Básquetbol
- Founded: 27 January 2018; 7 years ago
- History: Punto Rojo LR; 2018–present
- Location: Ibarra, Ecuador
- President: Edwin Robles
- Championships: 1 (2022)

Punto Rjo Lenin Robles, better known as Punto Rojo LR, is an Ecuadorian basketball team based in Ibarra, Imbabura Province. The team was founded on 27 January 2018 to tribute the late Lenin Robles Guevara, a former successful player in Ecuador. Punto Rojo plays in the Liga Ecuatoriana de Baloncesto (LEB), and won its first championship in 2022.

In 2022, Punto Rojo made its continental debut when it played in the Liga Sudamericana de Básquetbol.

== Honours ==
Liga Ecuatoriana de Baloncesto

- Champions (1): 2022
