= Dar Tucker =

American-Jordanian basketball player

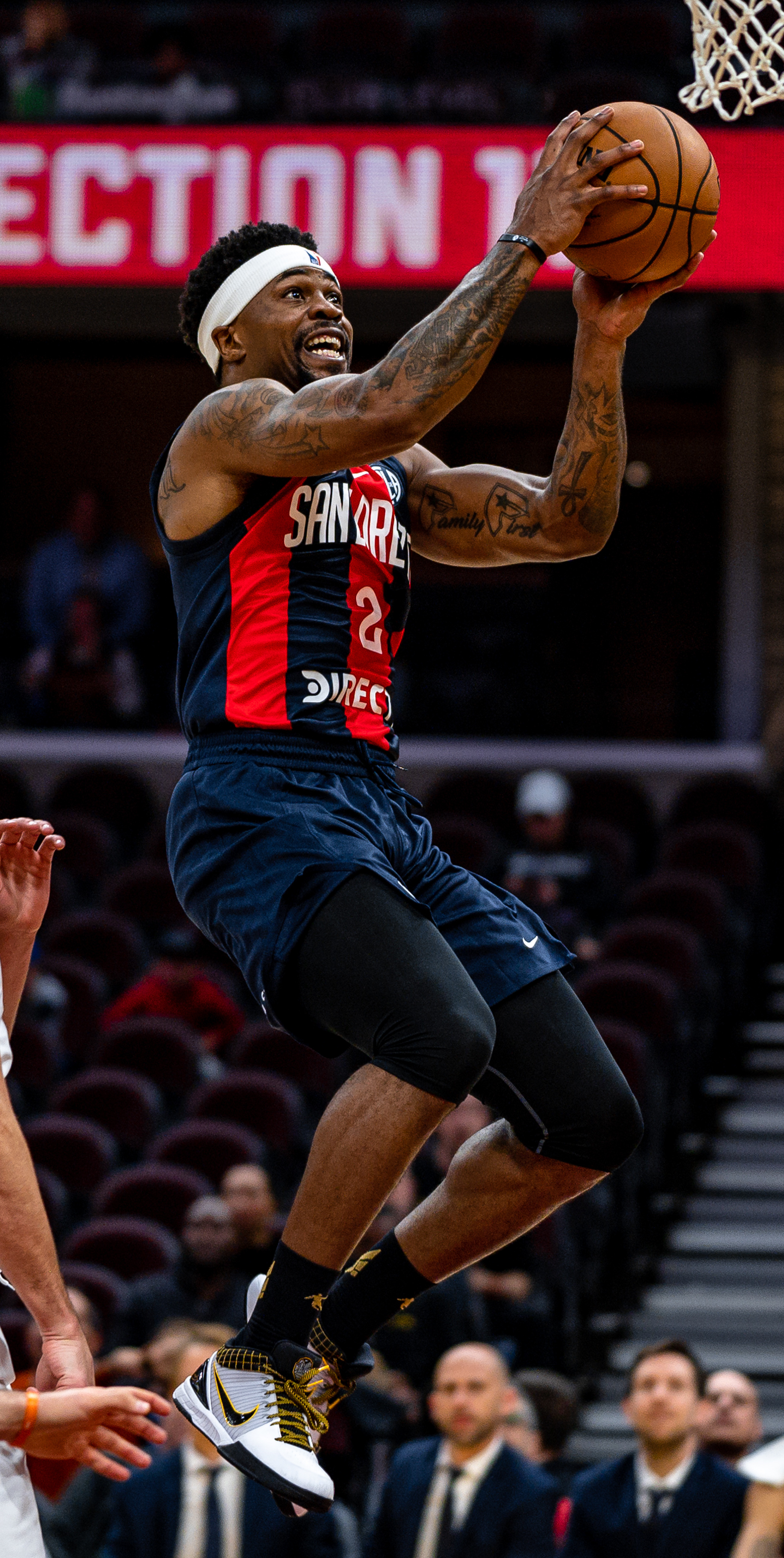
- Tucker with San Lorenzo in 2019

Personal information
- Born: April 11, 1988 (age 38) Saginaw, Michigan, U.S.
- Listed height: 6 ft 4 in (1.93 m)
- Listed weight: 205 lb (93 kg)

Career information
- High school: Arthur Hill (Saginaw, Michigan)
- College: DePaul (2007–2009)
- NBA draft: 2009: undrafted
- Playing career: 2009–2026
- Position: Shooting guard

Career history
- 2009–2010: Los Angeles D-Fenders
- 2010: Texas Legends
- 2010–2011: New Mexico Thunderbirds
- 2011–2012: Aix Maurienne
- 2012–2013: Reno Bighorns
- 2013: Cañeros del Este
- 2013–2014: Aix Maurienne
- 2015: Reno Bighorns
- 2015: Trotamundos de Carabobo
- 2015: Al Manama
- 2016: Estudiantes Concordia
- 2016: Huracanes del Atlántico
- 2016–2017: Estudiantes Concordia
- 2017: Hunan Yongsheng
- 2017–2021: San Lorenzo
- 2021–2022: Flamengo
- 2022–2023: Boca Juniors
- 2023–2024: Beirut Club
- 2024: Reales de La Vega
- 2024: Mineros de Zacatecas
- 2024–2025: Hsinchu Toplus Lioneers

Career highlights
- FIBA Intercontinental Cup champion (2022); 2× Americas League champion (2018, 2019); Americas League Grand Final MVP (2019); Argentine League MVP (2017); Argentine League Finals MVP (2019); Argentine League Top Scorer (2017); 4× Argentine League champion (2017–2019, 2021); Argentine League Best Foreign Player (2017); NBA D-League Most Improved Player (2011); 2× NBA D-League Slam Dunk Contest Champion (2010, 2011); Third-team Parade All-American (2007)

Darquavis Lamar "Dar" Tucker (born April 11, 1988) is an American-Jordanian former professional basketball player. He played college basketball at DePaul University.

== High school ==
Tucker attended Arthur Hill High School, in Saginaw, Michigan, where he played high school basketball.

== College career ==
Tucker played college basketball at DePaul University, with the DePaul Blue Demons, from 2007 to 2009.

== Professional career ==
In both 2010 and 2011, Tucker won the D-League Slam Dunk Contest and was named the D-League's Most Improved Player in 2011.

For the 2011–12 season, he played Aix Maurienne Savoie Basket of France. He returned to Aix Maurienne for 2013–14.

On March 16, 2015, he was acquired by the Reno Bighorns of the NBA Development League, returning to the team for a second stint. On March 28, he tied the NBA D-League's single-game scoring record when he scored 58 points in a game against the Texas Legends and averaged 34.6 points, 10.1 rebounds and 1.6 assists per contest in 8 games. On April 23, after the conclusion of the 2014–2015 D-League season, he signed with Trotamundos de Carabobo of the Venezuelan Liga Profesional de Baloncesto. On May 30, he signed with Al-Manama of the Bahraini Premier League.

On December 23, 2024, Tucker signed with the Hsinchu Toplus Lioneers of the Taiwan Professional Basketball League (TPBL).

On February 12, 2025, Hsinchu Toplus Lioneers terminated the contract relationship with Tucker.

On September 16, 2026, Tucker announced his retirement from professional basketball.

== National team career ==
Tucker has been a member of the senior Jordanian national basketball team. With Jordan, he played at the 2016 FIBA Asia Challenge.
