= Liga Ecuatoriana de Baloncesto =

- Current season, competition or edition: 2024–25 Liga Ecuatoriana de Baloncesto season
- Sport: Basketball
- Founded: 1992
- No. of teams: 10
- Country: Ecuador
- Continent: FIBA Americas
- Most recent champion: IMP Alvarado (3rd title) (2026)
- Most titles: ESPE (6 titles)
- Website: ligas.feb.ec

The Liga Nacional de Baloncesto (abbreviated LNB) is the top professional basketball league in Ecuador. For sponsorship reasons the league is called the DirecTV Cup. The league is usually in session from June to October.

== Current clubs ==
Team	City, Province
Andes BC	Ibarra
ATUC BC	Cuenca
Calderón Tu Pasión	Calderón
Formativas Piratas	Ibarra
Henko	Cuenca
IMP Alvarado	Ambato
Monsters	Quito
Santa Maria	Machala
Sevilla's Team	Quito
Spartans Academy	Quito

== Champions ==
=== National Basketball League era (1999–2010) ===
Season	Champions	Runners-up
1999	UTE	ESPE
2000	ESPE	La Salle
2001	Mavort	UTE
2002	ESPE (2)	Mavort
2003	ESPE (3)	La Salle
2004	ESPE (4)	Deportivo Quevedo
2005	ESPE (5)	UTE
2006	ESPE (6)	Espoli
2007	Cancelled	
2008	Barcelona	ESPE
2009	Mavort (2)	UTE
2010	UTE (2)	ESPE

=== LEB era (2011–present) ===
Season	Champions	Runners-up	Finals score
2011	Mavort (3)	ESPOL	2–1
2012	Importadora Alvarado	Asociación Deportiva Naval	2–1
2013	CKT	Guerreros de Nuemane	3–1
2014	UTE (3)	CKT	4–2
2015	CKT (2)	UTE	4–1
2016	HR Portoviejo	ICCAN Macas	2–1
2017	ICCAN Macas	Piratas de Los Lagos	4–2
2018	Deportivo Juvenil de Vinces	ICCAN Macas	2–1
2019	Cancelled due to logistical issues		
2020	Cancelled due to the COVID-19 pandemic in Ecuador		
2021	Santa María	CyC Portoviejo	1–0
2022	Punto Rojo LR	Caballeros	2–0

=== LNB era (2022–present) ===
Season	Champions	Runners-up	Finals score
2023	Caballeros	Club Valle	2–0
2024	Santa Maria (2)	Ambato Soldiers	2–1
2025	Importadora Alvarado (2)	Andes	2–0
2026	Importadora Alvarado (3)	Andes	2–0

== Sources ==
- History
