= Oberá Tenis Club =

- Leagues: Liga Nacional
- Founded: 1940; 85 years ago
- Location: Oberá, Argentina
- Website: oberatenisclub.com.ar
Home	Away

Oberá Tenis Club is an Argentinean professional sports club located in Oberá. It is best known for its basketball team, which currently competes in the Torneo Nacional de Ascenso.

The club is internationally known because some of its players have represented their South American national teams at the FIBA Americas Championship.

== Notable players ==
To appear in this section a player must have either:

- Set a club record or won an individual award as a professional player.
- Played at least one official international match for his senior national team or one NBA game at any time.
- (Belize) Alex Carcamo
- (Paraguay) Jose Fabio
