= 2018 Liga Sudamericana de Básquetbol =

South American basketball league season

Liga Sudamericana de Básquetbol
- Season: 2018
- Dates: 2 October – 14 December 2018
- Games played: 38
- Teams: 16

Regular season
- Season MVP: David Jackson

Finals
- Champions: (Brazil) Franca (1st title)
- Runners-up: (Argentina) Instituto

The 2018 Liga Sudamericana de Básquetbol, or 2018 FIBA South American Basketball League, was the 23rd edition of the second-tier level continental professional club basketball competition in the Americas, the FIBA Americas League. Sixteen teams from South America competed over three rounds to determine the champion. The defending champions, Guaros de Lara, did not have the opportunity to defend their title, after the Venezuelan Basketball Federation failed to register the team in the competition, alleging financial troubles. Franca of Brazil won their first Liga Sudamericana de Básquetbol championship in team history by beating Instituto of Argentina.

== Team allocation ==
	Teams entering in this round	Teams advancing from previous round
Group phase (16 teams)	16 qualified teams	
Semifinal Phase (8 teams)		4 group winners from the group phase; 3 group runners-up from the group phase; 1 group third placed from the group phase
Finals (2 teams)		2 group winners from the semifinal phase

=== Teams ===
Group phase
(Argentina) Instituto (3rd)	(Brazil) Flamengo (3rd)	(Chile) Leones de Quilpué (2nd)	(Paraguay) Olimpia (1st)
(Argentina) Quimsa (5th)	(Brazil) Bauru (4th)	(Colombia) Fastbreak del Valle (2nd)	(Uruguay) Welcome (4th)
(Argentina) Libertad (CW)	(Brazil) Franca (5th)	(Ecuador) ICCAN Macas (1st)	(Uruguay) Goes (5th)
(Bolivia) Deportivo Calero (1st)	(Brazil) Minas Tênis Clube (WC)	(Ecuador) Piratas de los Lagos (WC)	(Uruguay) Aguada (WC)

The labels in the parentheses show how each team qualified for the place of its starting round:

- 1st, 2nd, etc.: League position after Playoffs
- CW: Cup winner
- WC: Wild card

== Group phase ==
Sixteen teams participated in the group phase, in which each team faced the other teams in the group once. Each group tournament was held at the arena of a host team. The two highest-placed teams in groups A, C, and D, and the highest-placed team in group B advanced to the semifinal phase. Also, the best third-placed team from groups A, C and D advanced to the semifinal phase. Games were played from 2 to 24 October, 2018.

=== Group A ===
Pos	Team	Pld	W	L	PF	PA	PD	Pts	Qualification
1	(Brazil) Franca (H)	3	3	0	268	218	+50	6	Advance to Semifinal Phase
2	(Argentina) Instituto	3	2	1	231	220	+11	5	Advance to Semifinal Phase
3	(Chile) Leones de Quilpué	3	1	2	220	249	−29	4	
4	(Uruguay) Club Atlético Aguada	3	0	3	226	258	−32	3	

Source: FIBA
(H) Hosts

Venue: Franca, Brazil

=== Group B ===
Pos	Team	Pld	W	L	PF	PA	PD	Pts	Qualification
1	(Paraguay) Olimpia	3	3	0	264	212	+52	6	Advance to Semifinal Phase
2	(Ecuador) ICCAN Macas (H)	3	2	1	234	212	+22	5	
3	(Bolivia) Club Deportivo Calero	3	1	2	234	270	−36	4	
4	(Ecuador) Piratas de los Lagos	3	0	3	229	267	−38	3	

Source: FIBA
(H) Hosts

Venue: Macas, Ecuador

=== Group C ===
Pos	Team	Pld	W	L	PF	PA	PD	Pts	Qualification
1	(Argentina) Quimsa	3	3	0	248	222	+26	6	Advance to Semifinal Phase
2	(Brazil) Bauru	3	2	1	237	222	+15	5	Advance to Semifinal Phase
3	(Brazil) Minas Tênis Clube	3	1	2	218	223	−5	4	Advance to Semifinal Phase
4	(Colombia) Fastbreak del Valle (H)	3	0	3	225	261	−36	3	

Source: FIBA
(H) Hosts

Venue: Cali, Colombia

=== Group D ===
Pos	Team	Pld	W	L	PF	PA	PD	Pts	Qualification
1	(Brazil) Flamengo	3	3	0	277	239	+38	6	Advance to Semifinal Phase
2	(Argentina) Libertad	3	2	1	252	235	+17	5	Advance to Semifinal Phase
3	(Uruguay) Welcome	3	1	2	226	240	−14	4	
4	(Uruguay) Goes (H)	3	0	3	214	255	−41	3	

Source: FIBA
(H) Hosts

Venue: Montevideo, Uruguay

=== Best third-placed team ===
Pos	Grp	Team	Pld	W	L	PF	PA	PD	Pts	Qualification
1	C	(Brazil) Minas Tênis Clube	3	1	2	218	223	−5	4	Advance to Semifinal Phase
2	D	(Uruguay) Welcome	3	1	2	226	240	−14	4	
3	A	(Chile) Leones de Quilpué	3	1	2	220	249	−29	4	

Source: FIBA

== Semifinal phase ==
The eight teams which advanced from the group phase played in this stage. The eight teams were split into two groups, in which each team faced the other teams in the group once. Each group tournament was held at the arena of a host team. The highest-placed teams in each group advanced to the Grand Final series. Games were played from 13 to 22 November 2018.

=== Group E ===
Pos	Team	Pld	W	L	PF	PA	PD	Pts	Qualification
1	(Brazil) Franca	3	2	1	257	231	+26	5 (Note: Franca 1–1, +9; Libertad 1–1, +5; Olimpia 1–1, –14)	Advance to Finals
2	(Argentina) Libertad	3	2	1	255	245	+10	5	
3	(Paraguay) Olimpia (H)	3	2	1	241	239	+2	5	
4	(Argentina) Quimsa	3	0	3	226	264	−38	3	

Source: FIBA
(H) Hosts
Notes:

Venue: Asunción, Paraguay

=== Group F ===
Pos	Team	Pld	W	L	PF	PA	PD	Pts	Qualification
1	(Argentina) Instituto	3	3	0	257	207	+50	6	Advance to Finals
2	(Brazil) Flamengo (H)	3	2	1	277	242	+35	5	
3	(Brazil) Minas Tênis Clube	3	1	2	207	240	−33	4	
4	(Brazil) Bauru	3	0	3	200	252	−52	3	

Source: FIBA
(H) Hosts

Venue: Rio de Janeiro, Brazil

== Grand Finals ==
The Grand Finals were decided in a best-of-three playoff format. Games were played on 7, 13, and 14 December 2018. The team with the better record in the Semifinal phase played Games 2 and 3 (if necessary) at home.

Team 1	Series	Team 2	Game 1	Game 2	Game 3
Instituto (Argentina)	1–2	(Brazil) Franca	90–92	79–68	90–94
