= Club Deportivo Hispano Americano =

Hispano Americano
- Leagues: Liga Nacional de Básquet
- Founded: 1925; 100 years ago
- Arena: Estadio Tito Wilson
- Location: Río Gallegos, Santa Cruz, Argentina
- Team colors
- Head coach: Marcelo Richotti
Home	Away

Club Deportivo Hispano Americano is a professional basketball club based in Río Gallegos, Santa Cruz, Argentina. The club currently competes in the Liga Nacional de Básquet league.

On August 1, 2018, the club officially announced that it will compete again for the 2018–19 season under head coach Marcelo Richotti.

In 2016, Hispano Americano became the first club ever from the Santa Cruz Province to win promotion to the Liga Nacional de Básquet, Argentina's top basketball league.

== Players ==
=== Current roster ===
Note: Flags indicate national team eligibility at FIBA-sanctioned events. Players may hold other non-FIBA nationalities not displayed.

Hispano Americano roster
Players
Coaches

Pos.	No.	Nat.	Name
PG	0	(Haiti)	Hernst Laroche
F	1	(Argentina)	Diego Koch
PG	3	(Argentina)	Paletta, Nicolas	1.80 m (5 ft 11 in)	37 – 14 November 1987
G	4	(Uruguay)	Garcia, Diego	1.86 m (6 ft 1 in)
F	6	(Argentina)	Tabarez, Patricio	1.90 m (6 ft 3 in)	33 – 26 June 1991
C	7	(Argentina)	Fernando Podesta
PG	8	(Argentina)	Diego Ciorciari
F/C	14	(Argentina)	Gonzalo Torres
	21	(Argentina)	Eduardo Vasirani
PG	22	(Argentina)	Franco Bazani
G/F	32	(Argentina)	Mariano Byro

Head coach

(Argentina) Marcelo Richotti

Legend

- (C) Team captain
- Injured

- Roster
Updated: 7 July 2018

=== Notable former players ===
- (Argentina) Sebastián Acosta
- (Argentina) Diego Belvedere
- (Argentina) Diego Ciorciari
- (United States) Larry O'Bannon
- (United States) Kevin Ware
