= Estudiantes Concordia =

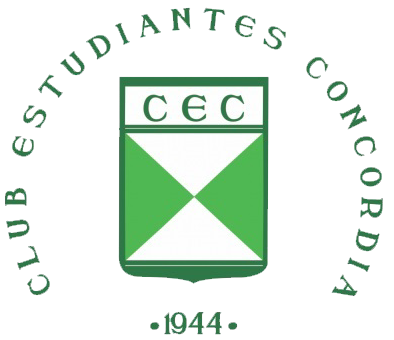
- Nickname: Verde
- Leagues: LNB
- Founded: May 9, 1944; 82 years ago
- Arena: San Luis 418
- Capacity: 1,600
- Location: Concordia, Entre Ríos
- Team colors
- President: Hugo Galarza
- Website: clubestudiantesconcordia.org
Home	Away

Club Estudiantes Concordia is an Argentine sports club located in the city of Concordia, Entre Ríos. The club is mostly known for its basketball team, which plays at Liga Nacional de Básquet, the top division of Argentine basketball league system. Estudiantes' arena is known as El Gigante Verde, which has a capacity of 1,600 spectators.

Association football is other notable sport of Estudiantes. In 2013 the team promoted to the first division of "Liga Concordiense de Fútbol", the regional league of Concordia. The squad currently plays at Torneo Federal C, a tournament similar to the old Torneo Argentino C, where teams from regional leagues take part in.

Apart from basketball and football, other sports practised at Estudiantes are karate, artistic roller skating and volleyball.

== History ==
The club was established by a group of students ("Estudiantes" in Spanish) from the city of Concordia, with the purpose of joining students of the city through sports disciplines. At the beginning, association football was the main sport of the club. The green color represented "hope" and the white, "purity".

For over the years Estudiantes was adding activities, such as basketball. Estudiantes rented the facilities of Club Vasco on La Rioja and Catamarca streets, where works began to make the arena suitable for the practise of that sport.

In 1951, Estudiantes added a female basketball section. Eleven years later, the Municipality of Concordia gave Estudiantes a land next to Mitre Park, which was destinated to the practise of football until the 1990s when the Municipality took over the land again. Other sections added were karate (in late 1990s) and volleyball in 2003.

In 1984 Estudiantes promoted to the second division (Liga B), winning the championship one year later. Gustavo Aguirre, Eduardo Pagella, Eduardo López, Esteban de la Fuente and American James Milton Bradley were some of the notable players of that team, coached by Edgardo Vecchio.

Estudiantes won the last round of that tournament facing Ciclista Olímpico, Peñarol, Sportivo 9 de Julio, Gimnasia y Esgrima (LP) and Sportivo San Salvador, winning the series with 6 victories and 4 losses therefore promoting the first division, Liga Nacional.

=== Liga Nacional ===
Estudiantes debuted in the first division of Argentina in 1987, playing its home venues at Ferrocarril stadium which has higher capacity. Estudiantes reaches the playoffs, being defeated by Gimnasia y Esgrima (LP). The next season the team also reached the playoffs when it lost to Deportivo San Andrés.

Estudiantes played its third season in 1989 but the club abandoned the championship for economic reasons. The LNB sent the team to the second division. After playing in regional leagues, in 2011 the Basketball Clubs Association of Argentina approved the entry of six clubs to Torneo Nacional de Ascenso, being Estudiantes among them. Estudiantes debuted in the second division playing the 2011–12 season, where finished 4th.

In the 2012–13 Estudiantes promoted to LNB, beating Quilmes de Mar del Plata, and San Martín de Corrientes at semifinals and finals, respectively. Estudiantes has been playing in LNB since then.

== Players ==
=== Current roster ===
Logo of the basketball section

Estudiantes Concordia roster
Players
Coaches

Pos.	No.	Nat.	Name	Ht.	Age
SF	0	(United States)	Draper, Daviyon	2.01 m (6 ft 7 in)	32 – 6 August 1994
PG	3	(Argentina)	Cuelho, Santiago	1.75 m (5 ft 9 in)	29 – 11 February 1997
C	4	(Argentina)	Dominguez, Emilio	2.02 m (6 ft 8 in)	38 – 13 December 1987
SG	7	(Argentina)	Grun, Federico	1.91 m (6 ft 3 in)	29 – 13 November 1996
SG	9	(Venezuela)	Chourio, Pedro	1.86 m (6 ft 1 in)	36 – 13 March 1990
PG	10	(Argentina)	Cafferata, Enzo	1.86 m (6 ft 1 in)	38 – 6 March 1988
SF	13	(Dominican Republic)	Carreras, Xavier	1.98 m (6 ft 6 in)	31 – 9 October 1994
SF	22	(Argentina)	Uranga, Sebastián	2.00 m (6 ft 7 in)	37 – 25 April 1989
SG	23	(Argentina)	Catani, Iván	1.94 m (6 ft 4 in)	27 – 27 August 1998

Head coach

- (Argentina) Lucas Victoriano

Assistant coach(es)

- (Argentina) Bernardo Murphy

Legend

- (C) Team captain
- Injured

- Roster
Updated: 2020-01-01

=== Notable players ===
Note: Flags indicate national team eligibility at FIBA-sanctioned events. Players may hold other non-FIBA nationalities not displayed.

Criteria

To appear in this section a player must have either:

- Set a club record or won an individual award while at the club
- Played at least one official international match for their national team at any time
- Played at least one official NBA match at any time.

- (Argentina) Matias Nocedal
- (Argentina) Jonatan Slider
- (Cuba) Javier Justiz Ferrer
- (Cuba) Jasiel Rivero
- (United States) Lee Roberts
- (United States) Darquavis Tucker
- (Cuba) Jasiel Rivero

== Honours ==
- Primera Nacional B (1): 1986
- Torneo Nacional de Ascenso (1): 2012–13
