= Club San Martín de Corrientes =

San Martín (Corrientes)
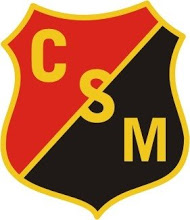
- Nickname: Rojinegro
- Leagues: LNB
- Founded: 24 January 1932; 93 years ago
- Arena: El Fortín Rojinegro
- Location: Corrientes Province, Argentina
- Team colors
- President: Alberto Sottile
- Head coach: Ariel Rearte
- Website: sanmartincorrientes.com
Home	Away

Club San Martín is a sports club based in Corrientes, Argentina. The basketball team currently plays in the Torneo Nacional de Ascenso (TNA), the second division of the Argentine Liga Nacional de Básquetbol league system.

== History ==
San Martín was founded in 1932 by some management leaders of Club 9 de Julio, which had recently closed. The club was originally named "Robson Tenis Club" after local tennis champion Guillermo Robson. Antonio Peluffo was the first president.

From the beginning the club hosted diverse activities such as basketball, tennis, track and field, table tennis and swimming.

The following year, San Martín acquired land on the corner of Salta and Moreno streets to set up its headquarters, still current.

In 2022, San Martin was the runner-up in the 2022 Liga Sudamericana de Básquetbol, losing to Bauru from Brazil in the Grand Final in Buenos Aires.

== Players ==
=== Current roster ===
2019-20 season:

San Martín de Corrientes roster
Players
Coaches

Pos.	No.	Nat.	Name	Ht.	Age
PG	3	(Argentina)	Faggiano, Lucas	1.88 m (6 ft 2 in)	36 – 21 March 1989
PG	9	(Argentina)	Iglesias, Ramiro	6 ft 1 in (1.85 m)	34 – 12 September 1990
SF	17	(Argentina)	Basabe, Emiliano	1.92 m (6 ft 4 in)	33 – 2 July 1992
PG	51	(Argentina)	Cafferata, Enzo	6 ft 1 in (1.85 m)	37 – 6 March 1988
SF	18	(Argentina)	Zanzottera, Tomás	1.90 m (6 ft 3 in)	31 – 8 December 1993
SF	21	(Argentina)	Eslava, Ariel	2.04 m (6 ft 8 in)	46 – 11 April 1979
C	22	(Argentina)	Tintorelli, Damián	2.06 m (6 ft 9 in)	43 – 4 December 1981
PF	24	(United States)	Roberts, Lee	2.01 m (6 ft 7 in)	38 – 10 February 1987
PF	30	(Ireland)	Fitzpatrick, Brian	2.03 m (6 ft 8 in)	35 – 6 November 1989
F/C	40	(United States)	Keenan, Justin	6 ft 7 in (2.01 m)	37 – 2 May 1988
G/F	44	(Argentina)	Lescano, Matias	6 ft 5 in (1.96 m)	45 – 29 September 1979
C	88	(Argentina)	Orlietti, Pablo	2.05 m (6 ft 9 in)	35 – 17 January 1990

Head coach

- (Argentina) Sebastian Gonzales

Legend

- (C) Team captain
- Injured

- Roster
Updated: 2020-01-01

=== Notable players ===
Note: Flags indicate national team eligibility at FIBA-sanctioned events. Players may hold other non-FIBA nationalities not displayed.

Criteria

To appear in this section a player must have either:

- Set a club record or won an individual award while at the club
- Played at least one official international match for their national team at any time
- Played at least one official NBA match at any time.

- (United States) Justin Keenan

== Honours ==
- Liga Sudamericana de Básquetbol
  - Runners-up (1): 2022
