= Juventud Sionista =

Sionista Basquet
- Leagues: Liga Federal [es]
- Founded: 25 May 1930; 96 years ago
- Arena: Moisés Flesler Stadium
- Capacity: 2,150
- Location: Enrique Carbó 149, Paraná, Entre Ríos, Argentina
- Team colors: (Sky blue, white, orange)
- President: Daniel Soskin
- Championships: 1 TNA
| Home | Away |

Centro Juventud Sionista, also known as Sionista de Paraná or Sionista Basquet, is an Argentine sports club based in Paraná, Entre Ríos. It was founded on 25 May 1930. Although the club participates in several sporting and social activities, it is best known for its basketball team, which currently competes in Liga Federal de Básquet [es], the third division of Argentine basketball organised by CABB.

The club's headquarters are located at 149 Enrique Carbó Street in Paraná. The basketball team plays its home games at the Moisés Flesler Stadium, which has a capacity of approximately 2,150 spectators.

Sionista's greatest sporting achievement was winning the 2005–06 Torneo Nacional de Ascenso, which secured promotion to the Liga Nacional de Básquet, the highest division of Argentine basketball. The club remained in the top division for ten consecutive seasons, reaching the league semifinals twice and participating in the Torneo Súper 8 in 2006, 2007, and 2009.

In 2016, Sionista lost the relegation playoff against Lanús and was relegated to the Torneo Nacional de Ascenso. Following its relegation, the club withdrew from competitions organised by the Asociación de Clubes, including the second division. Its place in the competition was subsequently transferred to Villa San Martín of Chaco through an agreement between the clubs.

== History ==
Centro Juventud Sionista was founded on 25 May 1930 by a group of young people seeking to organise sporting, cultural and social projects for Paraná's Jewish community while also strengthening links with the wider local community. During the same year, the club became affiliated with the Entre Ríos Basketball Federation.

Volleyball was added to the club's activities in 1980, followed by chess in 1990. Sionista won the tournament organised by the Paraná Basketball Association in 1996 and 1997.

=== Torneo Nacional de Ascenso ===
Sionista competed for several seasons in the Primera Nacional B, commonly known as Liga B. It reached that division in 1999 after winning the Liga Provincial de Clubes.

During the 2002–03 season, the club competed in Liga B and also participated in the inaugural edition of the Copa Argentina de Básquet, an official preseason competition. Sionista was eliminated in the first round of the 2002 Copa Argentina after losing its two-legged series against Belgrano de San Nicolás.

The season was nevertheless the club's last in Liga B. Sionista earned promotion to the Torneo Nacional de Ascenso after defeating Unión de Sunchales in the promotion semifinals. Although it lost the championship final to Olimpia de Venado Tuerto, Sionista was promoted to the second division.

Sionista began the 2003–04 season by competing in the 2003 Copa Argentina, its second appearance in the competition. It was eliminated in the first round by Obras Sanitarias after losing both games.

In the 2003–04 season, the team was coached by Sebastián Svetliza. It competed in the TNA 2 group, finishing fifth and failing to qualify for the next stage.

Sionista was again eliminated in the first round of the 2004 Copa Argentina, this time by Boca Juniors. The squad for the 2004–05 season included returning players Santiago Vesco, Salvador Bahler, Emiliano Martina, and Martín Dobry, together with new signings Juan Pablo Cantero, Oscar Heis, and Alejandro Zilli. Svetliza remained as head coach.

After the first phase, Sionista finished among the leading four teams in TNA 1 and qualified for the quarterfinals. It defeated Olimpia de Venado Tuerto, a former national and South American champion, before being eliminated by Ciclista Juninense, which ultimately earned promotion.

In 2005, Sionista recorded its best performance in the Copa Argentina. It first eliminated Regatas Corrientes after winning both matches. It then drew its series with Atenas at one game apiece but advanced on aggregate point difference, having scored ten more points than its opponent. Sionista was subsequently eliminated by Libertad, which qualified for the competition's final four.

In the 2005–06 season, Sionista competed in TNA 2 before advancing to the reclassification round. It defeated the Racing–Pedro Echagüe combined team in four games and then eliminated Gimnasia y Esgrima La Plata to reach the promotion final against Regatas San Nicolás.

After defeating Regatas and securing promotion, Sionista faced Quimsa in the championship series. Sionista defeated Quimsa in three games to win its first title in Argentine professional basketball.

The championship-winning squad consisted of Pedro Franco, Oscar Heis, Todd Williams, Emiliano Martina, Alejandro Zilli, Santiago Vesco, Juan Salvador Bahler, Daniel Hure, Martín Dobry, and Marcelo Bondarenco. Sebastián Svetliza was the team's head coach.

=== Liga Nacional de Básquet era ===
Sionista began the 2006–07 season in Copa Argentina. The competition had adopted a group-stage format, and Sionista was drawn alongside Belgrano de San Nicolás, Regatas de San Nicolás and Echagüe de Paraná. The team won five games and lost one, advancing to the semifinals before being eliminated by Regatas Corrientes.

Sionista began its first Liga Nacional campaign with nine victories and five defeats, qualifying for the 2006 Torneo Súper 8, its first appearance in the competition. The team was eliminated in its opening match in Neuquén, losing by one point to Boca Juniors.

Sionista's performance declined during the national phase, and it finished ninth before entering the reclassification round against Deportivo Madryn.

In the following season, Sionista finished second in its Copa Argentina group but failed to advance. In Liga Nacional, the team finished third in the first phase and qualified for the 2007 Torneo Súper 8 for the second consecutive year. Sionista reached the semifinals, where it lost to Libertad, the eventual champion. The club finished ninth in the national phase of the league and was eliminated by Obras Sanitarias in the reclassification round. Sionista failed to progress from the first round of the 2008 Copa Argentina. In 2008–09 LNB, it did not qualify for the Súper 8 but finished fifth in the national phase.

The club defeated Quilmes de Mar del Plata in the reclassification round and then eliminated Gimnasia y Esgrima de Comodoro Rivadavia to reach the Liga Nacional semifinals for the first time. Sionista faced Atenas de Córdoba, which eliminated the club after winning the third match of the series in Paraná.

In 2009, Sionista reached the final four of the Copa Argentina, held in Trelew. The club lost all of its matches and finished fourth. It also qualified for the 2009 Torneo Súper 8, where it was eliminated by Peñarol de Mar del Plata, the eventual champion.

Sionista achieved its best regular-season Liga Nacional finish during the 2009–10 season, placing third. This result gave the club direct qualification for the quarterfinals and a place in the inaugural Torneo InterLigas.

Sionista defeated Quimsa in the quarterfinals and again faced Atenas in the semifinals. The series lasted five games, with Atenas winning the deciding match.

In 2010, Sionista was eliminated in the semifinals of the Copa Argentina. The club struggled during the 2010–11 season, losing nine of its fourteen first-phase matches and twenty of its thirty second-phase matches. It was consequently required to contest a relegation series against El Nacional Monte Hermoso.

Sionista won the opening game away from home but lost the second match in Monte Hermoso. After the series moved to Paraná, Sionista won the third game 80–78 and then won the fourth game to retain its place in the top division.

The 2011–12 season did not include a Copa Argentina and began directly with the Liga Nacional. Sionista finished the first phase with seven wins from fourteen matches. It did not participate in the 2011 Torneo Súper 8 following a decision by the competition organisers.

The team improved during the second phase, winning seventeen of thirty games and finishing sixth. This gave Sionista home-court advantage in the reclassification round, where it faced Bahía Blanca Basket. Bahía won the first three games and eliminated Sionista.

In the 2012–13 LNB season, Sionista again failed to qualify for the Súper 8. It won fifteen of its thirty matches in the second phase and was paired with Atenas in the playoffs. The two clubs had previously met in several elimination series, all of which had been won by Atenas. The Córdoba club again won the series.

In its eighth season in the top division, Sionista again failed to qualify for the Súper 8. It finished eighth in the second phase and was eliminated by Quilmes de Mar del Plata in three games. The competition format changed significantly during Sionista's ninth Liga Nacional season. The club reached the conference quarterfinals, equivalent to the national round of 16, but was eliminated by Quimsa.

Sionista began its tenth Liga Nacional campaign positively, opening with four consecutive victories and completing the first phase with an equal number of wins and losses. The team's performance declined substantially during the second phase. It won only eleven of thirty-eight matches and finished last in the Northern Conference with three games still to play. Head coach Sebastián Svetliza resigned during the season and was replaced by Miguel Volcán Sánchez. Its last-place finish required Sionista to contest a relegation playoff against the bottom team from the Southern Conference. The opponent was Lanús, which held home-court advantage. Lanús won the first match, while Sionista won the second. Lanús then won both games in Paraná, relegating Sionista to the Torneo Nacional de Ascenso.

Across its ten Liga Nacional seasons, Sionista played a reported 515 games, recording 236 victories and 276 defeats. Daniel Hure made the most appearances for the club in the competition, while Alejandro Zilli was its leading scorer.

Following relegation, uncertainty surrounded the club's continued participation in national basketball. Club president Marcelo Svetliza stated that a decision had not yet been made regarding participation in the second division.

The club later confirmed its withdrawal from the Torneo Nacional de Ascenso, ending its period in Argentina's professional national competitions.

In September 2016, an agreement between Sionista and Villa San Martín of Chaco was officially announced. Under the agreement, Sionista's place in the Torneo Nacional de Ascenso was transferred to Villa San Martín.

=== Return through Liga Federal ===
In 2023, Sionista returned to national competition after finishing as runner-up in Conference 2 of the 2022 Entre Ríos Prefederal Tournament. The club participated in the 2023 Liga Federal de Básquetbol [es] as a member of Group 1 in the Litoral Conference. After finishing fifth and advancing through two play-in stages, Sionista was eliminated by Provincial de Rosario in the conference playoffs. Provincial later became one of the promoted teams.

In 2024, Sionista returned to Liga Federal after winning Conference 3, known as the Región Dos Orillas, of the 2023 Prefederal Tournament.

== Players ==
=== Current roster ===
Sionista Basquet roster
Players
Coaches

| Pos. | No. | Nat. | Name | Ht. | Age |
|---|---|---|---|---|---|
| | | (Argentina) | Bender, Victor | | 19 – 21 October 2006 |
| | | (Argentina) | Bria, Fausto | | 19 – 24 April 2007 |
| | | (Argentina) | Follmer, Jerónimo | | 19 – 13 May 2007 |
| | | (Argentina) | Golda, Ramiro | | 19 – 17 March 2007 |
| | | (Argentina) | González, Franco S. | | 22 – 23 April 2004 |

Head coach

- (Argentina) n/a

Legend

- (C) Team captain
- Injured

- Roster
Updated: 16 Aug 2026

=== Notable former players ===
- (Argentina) Daniel Hure (2004–11, 2011–14, 2015–16, 2023) (Note: most Liga Nacional appearances for Sionista; winner of the shoot-out competition at the 2014 FIBA 3x3 World Cup.)
- (Argentina) Alejandro Zilli (2004–08, 2009–14) (Note: most points and rebounds for Sionista in the Liga Nacional.)
- (Argentina) Juan Pablo Cantero (2007–09, 2013–15) (Note: most assists for Sionista in the Liga Nacional.)
- (Argentina) Luis Cequeira (2009–10, 2011–13)
- (Argentina) Mariano Byró (2006–08, 2013–14)
- (Paraguay) Javier Martínez (2008–10)
- (United States) Darren Phillip (2014–15)
- (United States) Chukie Robinson (?–2010)

== Head coaches ==
- (Argentina) Sebastián Svetliza (2003–16)
- (Uruguay) Miguel Sánchez (2016)

== Club records ==
=== Liga Nacional de Básquet ===
- Seasons: 10, from 2006–07 to 2015–16.
  - Best finish: Third overall and semifinalist in 2009–10.
  - Worst finish: Tenth in its conference and twentieth overall in 2015–16, followed by relegation through the survival playoff.

=== Torneo Nacional de Ascenso ===
- Seasons: 3, from 2003–04 to 2005–06.
  - Best finish: Champion and promoted in 2005–06.
  - Worst finish: Thirteenth of sixteen teams in 2003–04.

=== Third division ===
- Total seasons: 6.
  - Four seasons in Liga B, from 1999–2000 to 2002–03.
  - Two listed seasons in the Liga Federal de Básquetbol: 2023 and 2024.

== Honours ==
=== National ===
- Torneo Nacional de Ascenso (1): 2005–06

=== Regional ===
- Asociación Paranaense de Básquetbol (9): 1996, 1997, 2000, 2001 Ap, 2001 Cl, 2002 Ap, 2005 Cl, 2007 Ap, 2011 Ap
- Torneo Dos Orillas (Note: Contested by teams affiliated to both, Asociación Santafesina de Básquetbol (ASB) and Asociación Paranaense de Básquet (APB) from Entre Ríos and Santa Fe provinces of Argentina.) (1): 2008
- Torneo Pre Federal de Básquet (Región Dos Orillas) (1): 2023

== Other sports and activities ==
In addition to basketball, Centro Juventud Sionista promotes a range of sporting and recreational activities. These include adult volleyball, women's gymnastics, gymnastics programmes for older adults, a weight-training gym, introductory sports activities for children aged six and seven, women's adult volleyball, adult football and children's football for participants between four and twelve years old.
