= Marcos Mata =

Argentine basketball player (born 1986)

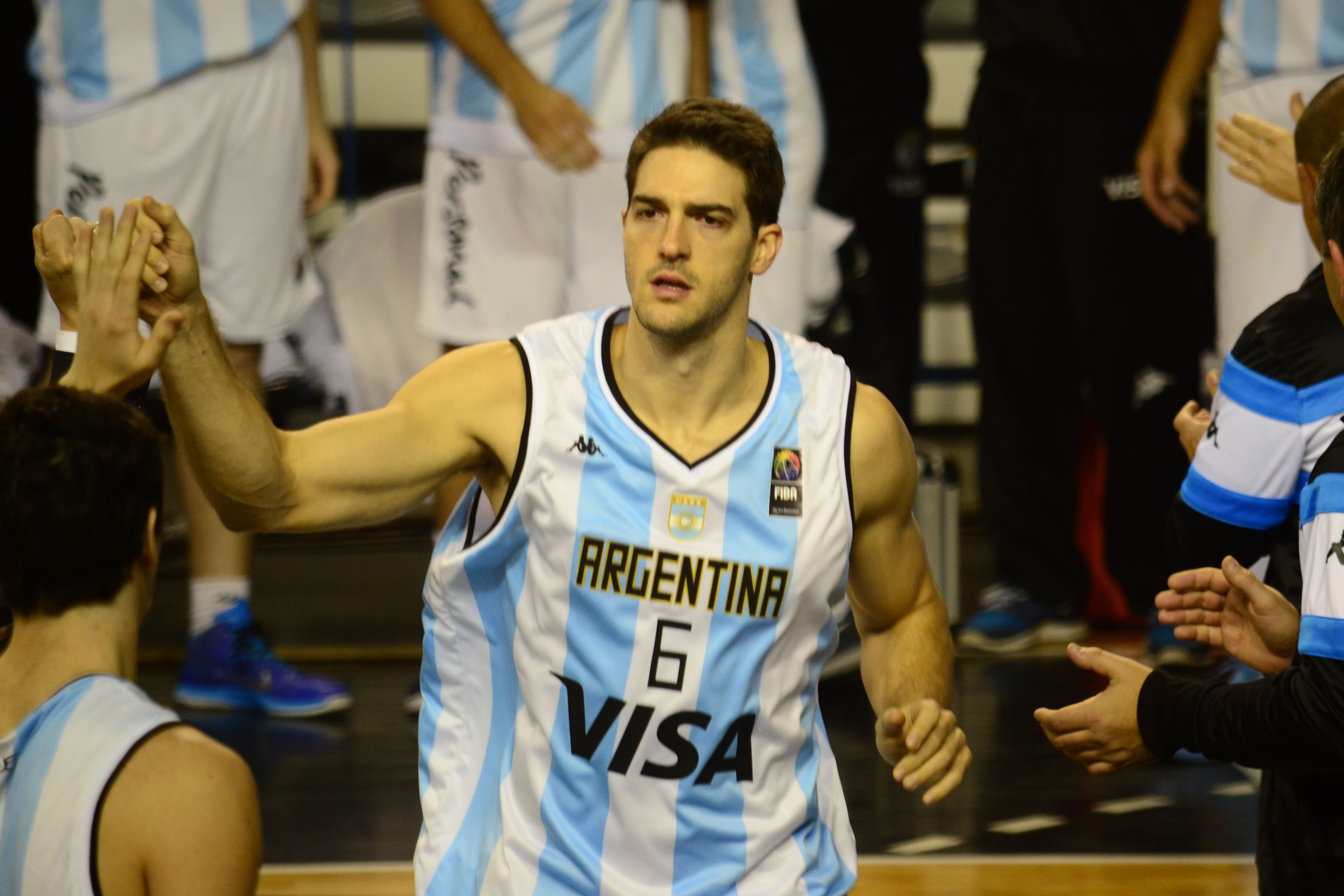
- Mata playing with Argentina, in 2015.

No. 6 – Obras Sanitarias
- Position: Small forward
- League: LNB

Personal information
- Born: August 1, 1986 (age 40) Mar del Plata, Argentina
- Listed height: 6 ft 7 in (2.01 m)
- Listed weight: 235 lb (107 kg)

Career information
- Playing career: 2003–present

Career history
- 2003–2013: Peñarol Mar del Plata
- 2013–2014: Sevilla
- 2014–2015: Franca
- 2015–2020: San Lorenzo
- 2020–2021: Saga Ballooners
- 2021–2022: Aguada
- 2022–2024: Boca Juniors
- 2024-present: Obras Sanitarias

Career highlights
- 4× FIBA Americas League champion (2008, 2010, 2018, 2019); 2× InterLeagues Tournament champion (2010, 2012); 6× Argentine League champion (2010, 2011, 2012, 2016, 2017, 2018); Argentine Cup winner (2010); 3× Argentine Super 8 Cup winner (2006, 2009, 2011); Argentine Super 4 Tournament winner (2017)
Medals
Representing Argentina
Men's Basketball
FIBA AmeriCup
Bronze medal – third place	2013 Venezuela
FIBA South American Championship
Gold medal – first place	2008 Puerto Montt
Silver medal – second place	2010 Neiva
Gold medal – first place	2012 Resistencia
Silver medal – second place	2014 Venezuela

Marcos Daniel Mata (born August 1, 1986) is an Argentine professional basketball player. He is a small forward, but he can also play at the shooting guard position. He plays professionally for Obras Sanitarias, and has also been a member of the senior men's Argentine national basketball team.

== Professional career ==
Mata began his pro career playing in the Argentine League with Peñarol Mar del Plata. In the 2009–10 season, he helped the team win its first ever Argentine League title, while also winning the FIBA Americas League 2009–10 season. He moved to the Spanish League club CB Sevilla before the 2013–14 season.

On July 27, 2020, Mata signed with Saga Ballooners of the Japanese B. League.

== National team career ==
Mata is also a member of the senior men's Argentine national basketball team. He made his debut with the senior Argentina national team at the 2008 South American Championship, helping the team to a gold medal. He later won a silver medal with the team at the 2010 South American Championship.

In 2010, Mata was named to Argentina's 2010 FIBA World Championship squad – his first major international tournament – when long-time Argentina national team player, Andrés Nocioni, withdrew from the tournament. He also played with Argentina at the 2012 Summer Olympics, and at the 2013 FIBA Americas Championship, where he won a bronze medal.
