= Carlos Matías Sandes =

Argentine-Italian basketball player

Matías Sandes
Personal information
- Born: June 14, 1984 (age 42) Mendoza, Argentina
- Listed height: 6 ft 7.5 in (2.02 m)
- Listed weight: 230 lb (104 kg)

Career information
- Playing career: 2001–2023
- Position: Power forward
- Number: 22

Career history
- 2001–2006: Boca Juniors
- 2006: Saski Baskonia
- 2006–2007: → Atapuerca Burgos
- 2007–2010: Fuenlabrada
- 2010–2011: Boca Juniors
- 2011–2013: Juventud Sionista
- 2013–2014: Quimsa
- 2014–2015: Boca Juniors
- 2015–2016: Gimnasia de Comodoro
- 2016–2018: San Lorenzo
- 2018–2020: Boca Juniors
- 2020: Hebraica Macabi
- 2021: Peñarol
- 2021: Israelita Macabi
- 2021-22: San Lorenzo
- 2022-23: Oberá Tenis Club
- 2023-24: Israelita Macabi
- 2025: Anzorena
- 2025-present: Israelita Macabi

Career highlights
- Spanish Supercup winner (2006); 3× South American Club Championship champion (2004, 2005, 2006); 3× Argentine League champion (2004, 2017, 2018); 4× Argentine Cup winner (2002, 2003, 2004, 2005); Argentine Top 4 Tournament winner (2004); Argentine League Best Quintet (2005); 2× Argentine League Best Sixth Man (2004, 2005); 3× Argentine League All-Star (2004, 2006, 2012)
Medals
Representing Argentina
Men's Basketball
FIBA AmeriCup
Silver medal – second place	2007 Las Vegas
Bronze medal – third place	2009 San Juan
FIBA South American Championship
Bronze medal – third place	2006 Caracas
Silver medal – second place	2010 Neiva
Gold medal – first place	2012 Resistencia
Marchand Cup
Silver medal – second place	2007 San Juan

Carlos Matías Sandes Steinmetz, commonly known as Matías Sandes (born June 14, 1984) is an Argentine-Italian professional basketball player. He currently plays with the Argentine club Israelita Macabi. Sandes has also represented the senior Argentina national basketball team. He plays mainly at the power forward position, but he can also play as a small forward and center.

== Professional career ==
Sandes began his pro career spending five years with Boca Juniors in the Argentine League. While Sandes was a member of Boca Juniors, they won the Argentine League championship (2003–04), four Argentine Cups (2002, 2003, 2004, 2005), and three consecutive South American Club Championships (2004, 2005, 2006). Sandes also played three seasons (2007–08, 2008–09, 2009–10) with Fuenlabrada of the Spanish Liga ACB.

== National team career ==
=== Argentine junior national team ===
With Argentina's junior national teams, Sandes played at the 2003 FIBA Under-19 World Cup, and at the 2005 FIBA Under-21 World Cup.

=== Argentine senior national team ===
Sandes has also represented the senior Argentina national basketball team. He made his senior national team debut at the 2006 FIBA South American Championship, where he won a bronze medal. With the senior Argentina national team, he also won a silver medal at the 2007 FIBA AmeriCup, and a bronze medal at the 2009 FIBA AmeriCup, where he averaged 3.6 points and 2.8 rebounds per game, in nine games of action. Sandes also won a silver medal at the 2010 FIBA South American Championship, and a gold medal at the 2012 FIBA South American Championship.

He also played with Argentina at the 2007 Marchand Continental Cup, the 2009 Marchand Continental Cup, and the 2019 FIBA Americas World Cup qualification.

== Personal life ==
Sandes was born in Mendoza, Argentina. Sandes' cousin, Ezequiel Bullaude, is a professional footballer.
