= Nicolás Casalánguida =

Argentine basketball coach

Club Atlético Boca Juniors
- Position: Head coach
- League: LNB

Personal information
- Born: 11 March 1979 (age 47) Comodoro Rivadavia, Chubut, Argentina
- Coaching career: 2008–present

Career history

Coaching
- 2008–2011: Gimnasia y Esgrima de Comodoro Rivadavia
- 2011–2016: Regatas Corrientes
- 2016–2017: Obras Sanitarias
- 2017–2019: Asociación Deportiva Atenas
- 2019–2020: Aguacateros de Michoacán
- 2021: Guaiqueríes de Margarita
- 2021–2022: Fuerza Regia de Monterrey
- 2022: Club Atlético Aguada
- 2022: Halcones Rojos Veracruz
- 2024–2026: Diablos Rojos del México
- 2026–present: Boca Juniors

Nicolás Casalánguida (Italian: [kazaˈlaŋɡwida]; born 11 March 1979) is an Argentine basketball coach. He is the head coach of the Boca Juniors.

== Coaching career ==
Casalánguida started his coaching career in Argentina with Gimnasia y Esgrima de Comodoro Rivadavia in the Liga Nacional de Básquetbol, the national first tier, where he was awarded as the best coach of the year in the season 2008–09.

In 2011 he joined Regatas Corrientes where the team won the Torneo Súper 8 de Básquet in 2012, the national championship of the 2012–13 season and the editions 2014 and 2015 of the Juego de las Estrellas. Individually he won for the second time coach of the year for the 2013–14.

On 2021, he signed with Fuerza Regia de Monterrey, where the team won the 2021 season championship.

In 2024, Casalánguida signed with the Diablos Rojos del México, a newly established team in Mexico City. In his first season, he reached the LNBP finals with Diablos, winning one championship.
