= Boca Juniors (basketball) =

- Nickname: Xeneizes
- Leagues: LNB
- Founded: 1929; 97 years ago (Basketball section)
- Arena: Estadio Luis Conde (capacity: 2,000)
- Location: Buenos Aires, Argentina
- Team colors: blue and gold
- President: Juan Román Riquelme
- Head coach: Nicolás Casalánguida
- Championships: 1 Basketball Champions League Americas; 3 Sudamericano de Clubes; 5 Liga Nacional de Básquet; 1 Argentine Club Championship; 1 Supercopa de La Liga (es); 5 Copa Argentina; 1 Torneo Top 4; 1 Copa Súper 20 (es); 6 Torneo Apertura; 6 Torneo Metropolitano; 7 Campeonato Oficial
- Website: bocajuniors.com.ar/basquet
Home	Away

Boca Juniors basketball section is part of the Boca Juniors sports club based in Buenos Aires, Argentina. The team plays in the Liga Nacional de Básquet (LNB), the first division of the Argentine league system. Boca's home games are played at the Estadio Luis Conde, also called the Bombonerita (in English: "Small Bombonera"), as a reference to the club's football stadium known as the La Bombonera.

At the local level, the Club has five championships of the LNB (1996–97, 2003–04, 2006–07, 2023–24 and 2024–25), and eight national cups, in which they stand out five editions of Copa Argentina consecutively (top winner of the contest: 2002, 2003, 2004, 2005 and 2006), one Torneo Top 4 in 2004, one Supercopa in 2024 and one Copa Súper 20 in 2025. It also has 22 titles in the amateur era, the most notable being the 1963 Argentine Club Championship (the highest category of Argentine basketball in the amateur era).

At the international level, it has won four titles: three in the South American Championship of Champion Clubs (2004, 2005 and 2006) and one in the Basketball Champions League Americas (2025-26).

Combining national and international competitions, it is the second most successful club in the history of Argentine basketball, with 18 official titles, behind Atenas (20).

== History ==
The origins of Boca Juniors' basketball section can be traced to 1929, when the club executives decided to open a basketball section, when the sport was still amateur in the country. Boca Juniors started competing one year later, when the club affiliated to "Federación Argentina de Básquetbol", the only regulation body by then.

Boca would then play in another basketball associations such as "Asociación de Básquet de Buenos Aires", where most of the football clubs played. In successive years, Boca would win a considerable amount of championships not only in the amateur or semi-professional leagues but also in professional Liga Nacional.

== Team image ==
=== Uniforms ===
for a detailed list see Boca Juniors Basketball kits on Commons

Historically, basketball kits have used similar patterns to football's, according to models by uniform suppliers. Away kits have varied from gold/yellow to white uniforms. Nevertheless in the 1990s, the traditional gold band was removed from the shirts, replacing it with the word "Boca" on a plain blue background.

In 1996, Boca Juniors signed a contract with Nike to provide uniforms to all the club disciplines. Until then, the basketball section had worn uniforms by different brands than the football section.

Between the 2001–02 and 2019 seasons, during the partnership with Nike, basketball jerseys were not sold to the public. According to various reports, the apparel was available at the beginning of the contract, even in a mobile store at La Bombonera, but subsequently ceased to be offered without official explanation. There were also no clear efforts by the club to reverse this situation, as acknowledged by the marketing manager in 2015. In a context of economic crisis and the brand's lower priority for basketball, the jerseys became a secondary concern.

In 2019, after failing to match the offer presented by Adidas, the partnership with Nike ended, and since 2020, apparel has once again been sold under the new agreement with the German company.

== Home arena ==
=== Luis Conde Stadium ===
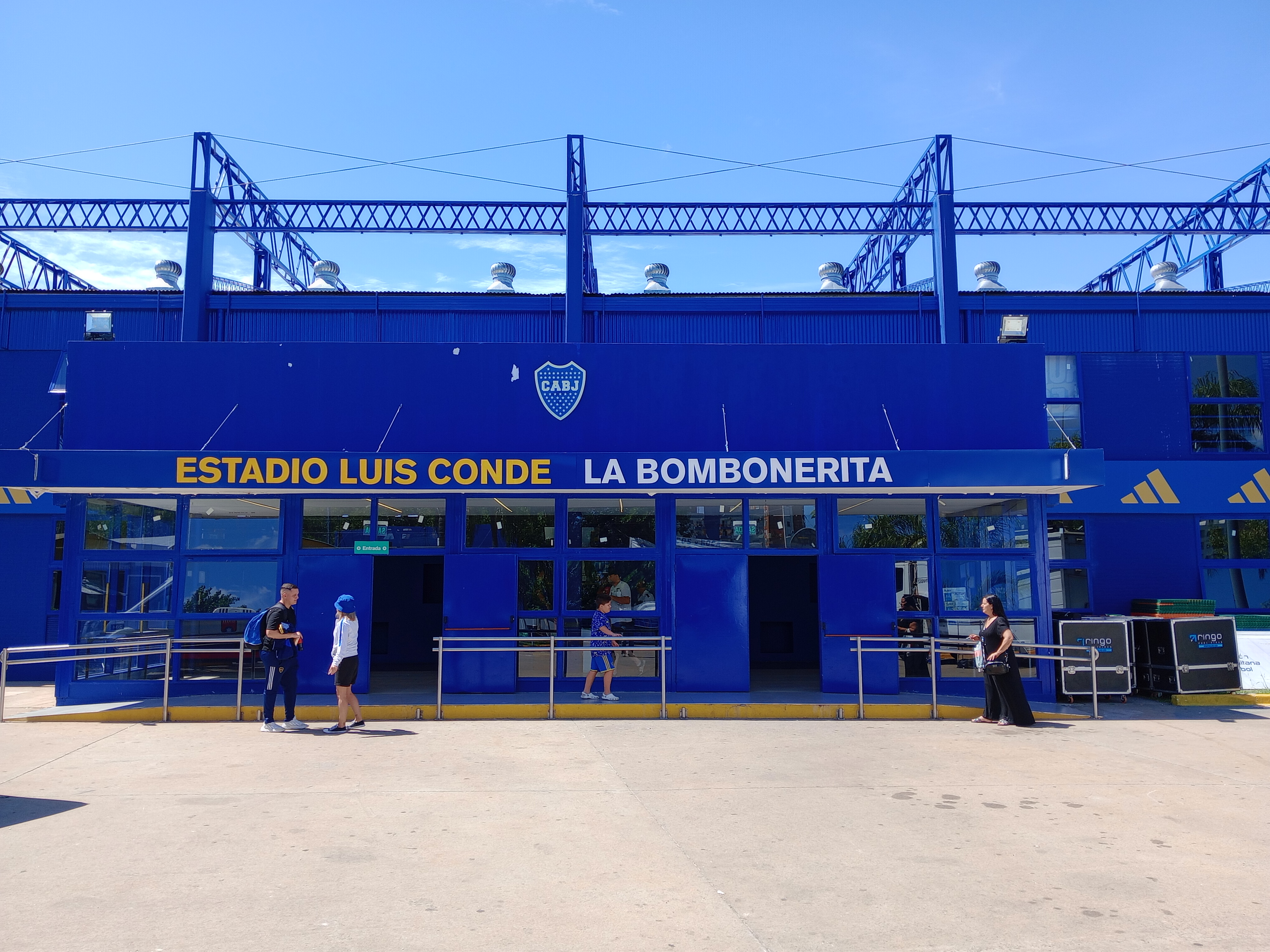
Luis Conde Arena, home venue, as seen in 2023

Located at Arzobispo Espinosa 600, in the Buenos Aires neighborhood of La Boca, the Luis Conde Stadium, known as "La Bombonerita", was inaugurated on 29 June 1996 and has a capacity of 2,000 spectators. On that date, its baptism took place with a friendly confrontation between the local team and Obras Sanitarias, which ended 85–74 for the homeowner.

In June 2022, a series of renovations were announced that were estimated to be completed by October of that same year, but were finally completed in January 2023. The renovation of the stadium, according to the head of the club basketball, was inspired by the Roberto Pando Sports Center, and consisted of replacing the game field, with FIBA certification; a 5700K LED projector lighting system; a reconditioning of changing rooms, offices, entrances and exterior, in addition to the installation of central air conditioning. The stadium was re-inaugurated on January 16 with the match between Boca and the Ciclista Olímpico Club for the 2022–23 National Basketball League, which culminated in Boca's victory by 84–76.

== Players ==
=== Current roster ===
2026–27 season

Boca Juniors roster
Players
Coaches

Pos.	No.	Nat.	Name	Ht.	Age
SG	0	(United States)	Warren, Micheal	1.96 m (6 ft 5 in)	30 – 7 November 1995
PG	3	(Argentina)	Faggiano, Lucas	1.88 m (6 ft 2 in)	33 – 21 March 1993
SF	4	(Argentina)	Stenta, Nicolás	2.00 m (6 ft 7 in)	22 – 30 January 2004
C	7	(Latvia)	Helmanis, Krišs	2.11 m (6 ft 11 in)	24 – 7 April 2002
PG	11	(Argentina)	Vildoza, José **(C)**	1.91 m (6 ft 3 in)	30 – 15 January 1996
SF	13	(Argentina)	Monacchi, Tomás	1.96 m (6 ft 5 in)	28 – 10 November 1997
PF	14	(Argentina)	Finetti, Valentino	2.06 m (6 ft 9 in)	21 – 5 August 2005
C	15	(Argentina)	Petri, Nicholas	2.08 m (6 ft 10 in)	20 – 3 February 2006
PF	19	(Argentina)	Barreiro, Agustín	2.05 m (6 ft 9 in)	27 – 2 February 1999
PF	20	(Argentina)	Lema, Leonardo	2.03 m (6 ft 8 in)	28 – 20 June 1998
C	22	(Argentina)	Cáffaro, Francisco	2.16 m (7 ft 1 in)	26 – 19 May 2000
SG	44	(Argentina)	Cuello, Martín	1.93 m (6 ft 4 in)	33 – 12 March 1993

Head coach

- (Argentina) Nicolás Casalánguida

Assistant coach(es)

- (Argentina) Gianluca Brignardello
- (Argentina) Agustín Lukac

Legend

- **(C)** Team captain
- Injured

- Roster
Updated: July 18, 2026

=== Depth chart ===
Pos.	Starting 5	Bench
C	**Francisco Cáffaro**	Krišs Helmanis
PF	**Leonardo Lema**	Agustín Barreiro
SF	**Tomás Monacchi**	Nicolás Stenta
SG	**Michael Warren**	Martín Cuello
PG	**José Vildoza**	Lucas Faggiano

=== Notable former players ===
Players who participated in the NBA are indicated in boldface, while those who became champions with the club are marked with the symbol. Likewise, players who set a club record are identified with the symbol, players who achieved an individual honor are marked with the symbol, and players who were part of the national team are indicated in italics.

Note: Flags indicate national team eligibility at FIBA-sanctioned events. Players may hold other non-FIBA nationalities not displayed.

Criteria

To appear in this section a player must have either:

- Set a club record or won an individual award while at the club
- Played at least one official international match for their national team at any time
- Played at least one official NBA match at any time.

- (Argentina) Horacio Beigier
- (Argentina) Carlos Raffaelli
- (Argentina) Rubén Scolari
- (Argentina) Julio Ariel Rodríguez
- (Argentina) Miguel Cortijo
- (Argentina) Gabriel Cocha
- (Argentina) Jorge Racca
- (Argentina) Mauricio Hedman
- (Argentina) Sebastián Festa
- (Argentina) Luis Villar
- (Argentina) Gustavo Ismael Fernández
- (Argentina) Diego Prego
- (Argentina) Ariel Eslava
- (Argentina) Gabriel Fernández
- (Argentina) Ariel Bernardini
- (Argentina) Daniel Farabello
- (Argentina) Rubén Wolkowyski
- (Argentina) Esteban de la Fuente
- (Argentina) Alejandro Montecchia
- (Argentina) Adrián Boccia
- (Argentina) Marcos Nóbile
- (Argentina) Héctor Campana
- (Argentina) Maximiliano Maciel
- (Argentina) Juan Pablo Sartorelli
- (Argentina) Matías Sandes
- (Argentina) Maximiliano Stanic
- (Argentina) Leandro Masieri
- (Argentina) Martín Leiva
- (Argentina) Pablo Sebastián Rodríguez
- (Argentina) Lucas Ortíz
- (Argentina) Fernando Malara
- (Argentina) Paolo Quinteros
- (Argentina) Luis Cequeira
- (Argentina) Leonardo Gutiérrez
- (Argentina) Raymundo Legaria
- (Argentina) Federico Aguerre
- (Argentina) Gustavo Oroná
- (Argentina) Leandro Palladino
- (Argentina) Leonel Schattmann
- (Argentina) Nicolás Aguirre
- (Argentina) Juan Espil
- (Argentina) Marcos Delia
- (Argentina) Sebastián Vega
- (Argentina) Nicolás Copello
- (Argentina) Federico Van Lacke
- (Argentina) Lucas Gargallo
- (Argentina) Patricio Prato
- (Argentina) Selem Safar
- (Argentina) Fabián Ramírez Barrios
- (Argentina) Kevin Hernández
- (Argentina) Nicolás Gianella
- (Argentina) Agustín Cáffaro
- (Argentina) **Carlos Delfino**
- (Argentina) Carlos Buendía
- (Argentina) Nicolás de los Santos
- (Argentina) Leandro Vildoza
- (Argentina) Marcos Mata
- (Argentina) Franco Balbi
- (Argentina) Leonardo Mainoldi
- (Argentina) José Vildoza
- (Argentina) José Defelippo
- (Argentina) Martín Cuello
- (Argentina) Franco Giorgetti
- (Argentina) Facundo Piñero
- (Argentina) Santiago Scala
- (Argentina) Juan Martín Guerrero
- (Argentina) Nicolás Stenta
- (Argentina) Francisco Cáffaro
- (Argentina) Lucas Faggiano
- (Argentina) Agustín Barreiro
- (United States) **Joe Cooper**
- (United States) **Derrick Gervin**
- (United States) **Alvin Heggs**
- (United States) Byron Wilson
- (United States) **Mike Higgins**
- (United States) **Ed O'Bannon**
- (United States) Leon Trimmingham
- (United States) **Ruben Nembhard**
- (United States) Dwigth Mc Cray
- (United States) **Sherell Ford**
- (United States) **Jamal Robinson**
- (United States) **Norman Richardson**
- (United States) Mark Bortz
- (United States) **Derrick Alston**
- (United States) Will Graves
- (United States) John De Groat
- (United States) Robert Battle
- (United States) **Kevinn Pinkney**
- (United States) **Allan Ray**
- (United States) Raven Barber
- (United States) Wayne Langston
- (United States) Thomas Cooper
- (United States) Michael Smith
- (Puerto Rico) Jerome Mincy
- (Puerto Rico) Eddie Casiano
- (Puerto Rico) **Daniel Santiago**
- (Puerto Rico) Isaac Sosa
- (Puerto Rico) Jasiel Rivero
- (Nigeria) Gabe Muoneke
- (Nigeria) Derrick Obasohan
- (Nigeria) Andy Ogide
- (Cuba) **Lázaro Borrell**
- (Mexico) Israel Gutiérrez
- (Uruguay) Martín Osimani
- (Venezuela) Windi Graterol
- (The Bahamas) Tavario Miller
- (Dominican Republic) Eloy Vargas
- (Jordan) Dar Tucker
- (Colombia) Andrés Ibargüen

== Head coaches ==
- This list only includes coaches of Club Atlético Boca Juniors from 1987 onwards, when it began competing in the professional era of Argentine basketball.

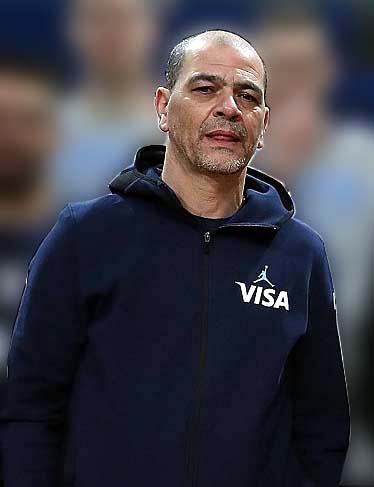
Sergio Hernández coached the team in 2003–05

N°	Coach	Tenure
1	Horacio Greco	1987
2	Horacio Seguí [es]	1988
3	Alberto Finger	1989–92
4	Ronaldo Córdoba	1992–93
5	León Najnudel	1993–95
6	Julio Lamas	1995–97
7	Néstor García	1997–99
8	Rubén Magnano	1999–00
9	Néstor García	2000–01
10	Fernando Duró [es]	2001–03
11	Sergio Hernández	2003–05
12	Carlos Duro [es]	2005–06
13	Eduardo Cadillac [es]	2006
14	Gabriel Piccato [es]	2006–08
15	Oscar Sánchez [es]	2008
16	Fernando Duró	2008–09
17	Pablo D'Angelo [es]	2009–10
18	Oscar Sánchez	2010–12
19	Néstor García	2012–13
20	Carlos Duro	2013–14
21	Ronaldo Córdoba	2014–15
22	Adrián Capelli [es]	2015–16
23	Ronaldo Córdoba	2016–17
24	Gustavo Fernández [es]	2017–18
25	Guillermo Narvarte	2018–20
26	Gonzalo García	2020–23
27	Carlos Duro	2023–24
28	Gonzalo Pérez [es]	2024–2026
29	Nicolás Casalánguida	2026–present

== Honours ==
Competition	Titles	Winning years
International
Basketball Champions League Americas	1	2025-26
South American Championship	3	2004, 2005, 2006
National
Liga Nacional de Básquet	5	1996–97, 2003–04, 2006–07, 2023–24, 2024–25
Argentine Championship	1	1963
Supercopa de La Liga (es)	1	2024
Copa Súper 20 (es)	1	2025
Copa Argentina	1	2002, 2003, 2004, 2005, 2006
Torneo Top 4	1	2004
Liga Nacional B	1	1988
Torneo Apertura	6	1938, 1939, 1961, 1962, 1963, 1964
Campeonato Argentino	1	1963
Campeonato Metropolitano	6	1957, 1959, 1961, 1962, 1963, 1969
Campeonato oficial	8	1940, 1941, 1962, 1963, 1965, 1966, 1967, 1970

== Season by season ==
- This list only includes the statistics of Boca Juniors from 1987, when it began competing in the professional era of Argentine basketball.

=== National League ===
Season	Division	Pos.	V-D	W%
1987	2.°	23.°	?	?
1988	2.°	1.°	?	?
1989	1.°	14.°	12–19	.387
1990	2.°	2.°	?	?
1990–91	1.°	10.°	16–25	.390
1991–92	1.°	13.°	17–29	.370
1992–93	1.°	13.°	23–29	.442
1993–94	1.°	12.°	18–30	.375
1994–95	1.°	4.°	30–21	.588
1995–96	1.°	8.°	28–24	.538
1996–97	1.°	1.°	42–16	.724
1997–98	1.°	2.°	39–16	.709
1998–99	1.°	5.°	32–17	.653
1999–00	1.°	5.°	32–17	.653
2000–01	1.°	3.°	32–20	.615
2001–02	1.°	4.°	33–17	.660
2002–03	1.°	2.°	38–11	.776
2003–04	1.°	1.°	44–13	.772
2004–05	1.°	2.°	40–16	.714
2005–06	1.°	5.°	31–21	.596
2006–07	1.°	1.°	36–24	.600
2007–08	1.°	5.°	29–19	.604
2008–09	1.°	7.°	26–27	.491
2009–10	1.°	3.°	31–23	.574
2010–11	1.°	13.°	17–30	.362
2011–12	1.°	8.°	22–30	.423
2012–13	1.°	4.°	32–20	.615
2013–14	1.°	3.°	32–20	.615
2014–15	1.°	14.°	23–34	.404
2015–16	1.°	17.°	25–31	.446
2016–17	1.°	19.°	20–41	.328
2017–18	1.°	14.°	17–26	.395
2018–19	1.°	7.°	25–23	.521
2019–20	1.°	9.°	13–13	.500
2020–21	1.°	3.°	27–15	.643
2021–22	1.°	4.°	29–19	.604
2022–23	1.°	2.°	35–19	.648
2023–24	1.°	1.°	34–19	.642
2024–25	1.°	1.°	39–14	.736
2025–26	1.°	4.°	29–17	.630
Totals	—	5 Titles	1048–806	.565

Champions Runners-up Promoted Relegated

=== In international competitions ===
Year	Competition	Round	W	L	W%
1998	FIBA South American League	Semifinals	9	2	.818
1999	FIBA South American League	Runners-up	6	4	.600
2000	FIBA South American League	Quarterfinals	3	3	.500
2004	FIBA South American League	Semifinals	5	4	.556
2004	South American Basketball Club Championship	Champions	4	1	.800
2005	FIBA South American League	Semifinals	5	3	.625
2005	South American Basketball Club Championship	Champions	4	1	.800
2006	FIBA South American League	Quarter finals	2	3	.400
2006	South American Basketball Club Championship	Champions	5	0	1.000
2007	South American Basketball Club Championship	Runners-up	4	1	.800
2007-08	FIBA Americas League	Group stage	1	2	.333
2008	FIBA South American League	Semifinals	5	4	.556
2010	FIBA South American League	Semifinals	4	3	.571
2013	FIBA South American League	Semifinals	3	4	.429
2014	FIBA South American League	Semifinals	5	3	.625
2019	Interleague Basketball Tournament	Group stage	1	2	.333
2021–22	BCL Americas	Quarterfinals	4	3	.571
2022	FIBA South American League	Quarterfinals	4	2	.667
2023–24	BCL Americas	Group stage	2	4	.333
2024–25	BCL Americas	Runners-up	7	4	.636
2025–26	BCL Americas	Champions	8	2	.800
2026	FIBA Intercontinental Cup	Semifinals	2	2	.500
Total	4 Titles	—	93	57	.620

Champions Runners-up Third place

== Franchise accomplishments and awards ==
=== Individual awards ===
MVP of the season

- Leonardo Gutierrez – 2007-08
- José Vildoza – 2024-25
- Francisco Cáffaro – 2025-26

Finals MVP

- Byron Wilson – 1996-97, 2003-04
- Leonardo Gutierrez – 2006-07
- José Vildoza – 2023-24, 2024-25

Best starting five of the season

- Paolo Quinteros – 2004-05, 2005-06
- Matías Sandes – 2004-05
- Leonardo Gutierrez – 2007-08
- John De Groat – 2012-13
- Daniel Santiago – 2012-13
- Jasiel Rivero – 2018-19
- Franco Balbi – 2022-23
- Leonel Schattmann – 2022-23
- José Vildoza – 2023-24, 2024-25
- Francisco Cáffaro – 2025-26

Best Sixth Man

- Diego Prego – 2002-03
- Matías Sandes – 2003-04, 2004-05
- Luis Cequeira – 2006-07
- Marcos Delia – 2013-14
- Carlos Buendía – 2020-21

Best Foreigner of the Year

- Jerome Mincy – 1996-97
- John De Groat – 2012-13

Best national player

- Leonel Schattmann – 2023-24
- José Vildoza – 2024-25
- Francisco Cáffaro – 2025-26

Revelation/Debutante

- Horacio Beigier – 1990-91
- Federico Van Lacke – 2012-13
- Francisco Cáffaro – 2025-26

Coach of the Year

- Julio Lamas – 1996-97
- Rubén Magnano – 1999-00

=== Records ===
- Match with the most points scored: Boca 146–129 Ferro (1995-96)
- Match with the most goals: Boca 141–137 Peñarol (1992)
- Biggest win: Boca 139–66 Andino (2002-03)
- Biggest defeat: Boca 65–111 Andino (1995-96)
  Boca 65–111 Peñarol (2009-10)
- Most consecutive wins: (14 games) (1997-98)
- Most consecutive home wins: (21 matches) (2002-03)
- Player with the most points scored in a game: (United States) Robert Siller (51 points) (1994-95)
- Player with the most points scored in a season: (Puerto Rico) Eddie Casiano (1366 points) (1997-98)

=== Historical players ===
==== Games played (1987–2025) ====
Player	Seasons	Matches
(Argentina) Martín Leiva	2001-2007, 2019-2020, 2020-2021, 2022-2023	378
(Argentina) Matías Sandes	2001-2006, 2014-2015, 2018-2020	331
(Argentina) Sebastián Festa	1994-2000, 2004	314
(Argentina) Adrián Boccia	1998-2001, 2015-2016, 2017-2022	312
(Argentina) Lucas Gargallo	2013-2020	290

==== Scoring leaders (1987-2025) ====
Player	Seasons	Matches	Points	Percentage
(Argentina) Adrián Boccia	1998-2001, 2015-2016, 2017-2022	312	3650	11.6
(Argentina) Paolo Quinteros	2003-2006	159	3338	20.9
(Argentina) Martín Leiva	2001-2007, 2019-2020, 2020-2021, 2022-2023	378	3270	8.6
(United States) Byron Wilson	1996-1997, 2003-2005	160	2873	17.9
(Argentina) Matías Sandes	2001-2006, 2014-2015, 2018-2020	331	2727	8.2

==== Assist leaders (1987-2025) ====
Player	Seasons	Matches	Assists	Percentage
(Argentina) Adrián Boccia	1998-2001, 2015-2016, 2017-2022	312	754	2.41
(Argentina) Sebastián Festa	1994-2000, 2004	314	726	2.31
(Argentina) Maximiliano Stanic	2001-2002, 2011-2013	154	624	4.05
(Argentina) Juan Sartorelli	2001-2005, 2007-2008	243	590	2.42
(Argentina) Matías Sandes	2001-2006, 2014-2015, 2018-2020	331	589	1.77

==== Total rebounds (1987-2025) ====
Player	Seasons	Matches	Rebounds	Percentage
(Argentina) Martín Leiva	2001-2007, 2019-2020, 2020-2021, 2022-2023	378	2108	5.57
(Argentina) Matías Sandes	2001-2006, 2014-2015, 2018-2020	331	1668	5.04
(Argentina) Adrián Boccia	1998-2001, 2015-2016, 2017-2022	312	1243	3.98
(Argentina) Gabriel Fernández	1996-2000, 2008, 2008-2009	266	1060	3.98
(Argentina) Federico Aguerre	2006-2008, 2012-2014, 2019-2022	237	987	4.16

==== Top scorers in three-pointers (1987-2025) ====
Player	Seasons	Matches	3-point	Percentage
(Argentina) Leonel Schattmann	2007-2008, 2020-2024	194	451	2.32
(Argentina) Paolo Quinteros	2003-2006	159	412	2.59
(Argentina) Sebastián Festa	1994-2000, 2004	314	358	1.14
(Argentina) Leonardo Gutiérrez	2006-2008	105	333	3.17
(Argentina) Gabriel Cocha	1993-1994, 1999-2003	174	314	1.80

==== Top scorers in doubles (1987-2025) ====
Player	Seasons	Matches	Double	Percentage
(Argentina) Martín Leiva	2001-2007, 2019-2020, 2020-2021, 2022-2023	378	1337	3.53
(Argentina) Adrián Boccia	1998-2001, 2015-2016, 2017-2022	312	1253	4.01
(Argentina) Matías Sandes	2001-2006, 2014-2015, 2018-2020	331	965	2.91
(Argentina) Luis Villar	1995-1998, 2000-2001	192	832	4.33
(Argentina) Paolo Quinteros	2003-2006	159	713	4.48

==== Top free throw scorers (1987-2025) ====
Player	Seasons	Matches	Free throws	Percentage
(Argentina) Gabriel Fernández	1996-2000, 2008, 2008-2009	266	683	2.56
(Argentina) Paolo Quinteros	2003-2006	159	676	4.25
(United States) Byron Wilson	1996-1997, 2003–2005	160	631	3.94
(Puerto Rico) Jerome Mincy	1996-1997, 1997-1998	107	541	5.05
(Argentina) Sebastián Festa	1994-2000, 2004	358	520	1.45
