= Sergio Hernández (basketball) =

Argentine basketball coach

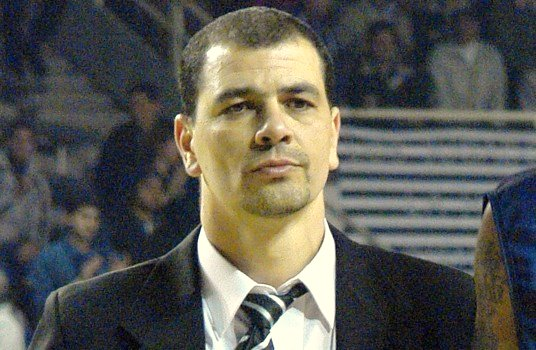
- Sergio Hernández in 2007.

Flamengo
- Position: Head coach
- League: NBB

Personal information
- Born: November 1, 1963 (age 63) Bahía Blanca, Argentina
- Listed height: 6 ft 0 in (1.83 m)
- Listed weight: 180 lb (82 kg)
- Coaching career: 1992–present

Career history

Coaching
- 1992–1995: Sport Club Cañadense
- 1995–1997: Deportivo Roca
- 1997–1998: Club de Regatas San Nicolás
- 1998–2002: Estudiantes de Olavarría
- 2002–2003: Alerta Cantabria Lobos
- 2003–2005: Boca Juniors
- 2007–2013: Peñarol de Mar del Plata
- 2013–2014: UniCEUB/BRB/Brasília
- 2014–2015: Piratas de Quebradillas
- 2015–2016: Peñarol de Mar del Plata
- 2020–2021: Casademont Zaragoza
- 2023: Leones de Ponce
- 2025–: Flamengo
- 2005–2010, 2015–2020, 2021: Argentina

Career highlights
- As head coach: Basketball Champions League Americas champion (2024-25); 2× FIBA Americas League champion (2008, 2010); FIBA South American League champion (2001); South American Club Championship champion (2004); Top 4 Tournament winner (2004); 6× Argentine League champion (2000, 2001, 2004, 2010–2012); 3× Argentine Cup winner (2003, 2004, 2010); 4× Argentine League Coach of the Year (1993, 2001, 2002, 2010)
Medals
Men's basketball
Head coach for Argentina
Olympic Games
Bronze medal – third place	2008 Beijing	Team
FIBA Basketball World Cup
Silver medal – second place	2019 China
FIBA Diamond Ball
Gold medal – first place	2008 Nankin
FIBA AmeriCup
Silver medal – second place	2005 Dominican Republic
Silver medal – second place	2007 USA
Silver medal – second place	2015 Mexico
Silver medal – second place	2017 Argentina
Bronze medal – third place	2009 Puerto Rico
Pan American Games
Gold medal – first place	2019 Lima
FIBA South American Championship
Gold medal – first place	2008 Chile
Bronze medal – third place	2006 Venezuela

Sergio Santos Hernández (born November 1, 1963) is an Argentine professional basketball coach for Flamengo of the NBB.

== Head coaching career ==
=== Pro clubs ===
As a head coach, Hernández has won numerous titles over his career. They include: 6 Argentine League championships (2000, 2001, 2004, 2010, 2011, 2012), the South American League championship (2001), 3 Argentine Cups (2003, 2004, 2010), the Top 4 Tournament (2004), the South American Club Championship (2004), and 2 FIBA Americas League championships (2008, 2010).

On November 3, 2020, he has signed with Casademont Zaragoza of the Spanish Liga ACB.

=== Argentina national team ===
Hernández was the head coach the senior men's Argentina national basketball team from 2005 to 2010. He succeeded Rubén Magnano in the position, and was the team's head coach at the 2006 FIBA World Championship, the 2008 FIBA Diamond Ball (where the team won the gold medal), the 2008 Summer Olympics (where the team won a bronze medal), and at the 2010 FIBA World Championship (where Argentina finished in 5th place).

After his contract to coach the Argentina national team expired in 2010, Hernández did not accept the 4–6 years renewal offered by the Argentine Basketball Federation, therefore ending his tenure as the national team's head coach. He did, however, return to the team as an assistant coach for the 2012 Summer Olympics.

He then returned as the head coach of Argentina for the 2015 FIBA Americas Championship, where he led Argentina to a silver medal. He was also the head coach of Argentina at the 2016 Summer Olympics.

In 2019, he coached the Argentina´s team that won the 2019 Pan American gold medal in Lima.

In 2019, Hernandez coached the men's Argentina national basketball team at the 2019 FIBA Basketball World Cup, where he led Argentina to a silver medal; securing them a spot in the 2020 Summer Olympics.
