= Juan Pablo Cantero =

Argentine basketball player (born 1982)

No. 21 – Unión de Santa Fe
- Position: Point guard
- League: LNB

Personal information
- Born: September 19, 1982 (age 44) Paraná, Entre Ríos, Argentina
- Listed height: 6 ft 0.25 in (1.84 m)
- Listed weight: 185 lb (84 kg)

Career history
- 2005–2006: Dinamo Sassari
- 2006–2007: RB Montecatini Terme
- 2007–2009: Juventud Sionista
- 2009–2010: Atenas
- 2010–2011: Libertad Sunchales
- 2011–2012: Club Atlético Lanús
- 2012–2013: Quimsa
- 2013–2015: Juventud Sionista
- 2015–2016: Club Atlético Lanús
- 2018: Olimpia Kings
- 2018–2019: Benfica
- 2020–2022: Peñarol Mar del Plata
- 2022–present: Unión de Santa Fe
Medals
Men's basketball
Representing Argentina
FIBA AmeriCup
Bronze medal – third place	2009 San Juan
FIBA South American Championship
Silver medal – second place	2010 Neiva

Juan Pablo Cantero (born September 19, 1982) is an Argentine professional basketball player for Unión de Santa Fe of the Liga Nacional de Básquet (LNB).

== Professional career ==
In 2007–08, Cantero averaged 11.2 points and 3.2 assists per game with Juventud Sionista of the Argentine League. In 2008–09, he averaged 13.2 points and 4.1 assists per game with the same club.

== National team career ==
On the heels of his successful 2008–09 season, Cantero was called up to the Argentine national basketball team for the first time at the 2009 Marchand Cup. He also competed with the team at the FIBA Americas Championship 2009, providing depth off the bench in helping the team qualify for the 2010 FIBA World Championship.

== Awards and accomplishments ==
=== Argentine national team ===
- 2009 FIBA Americas Championship: Bronze
- 2010 South American Championship: Silver
