= Román González (basketball) =

Argentine-Italian basketball player

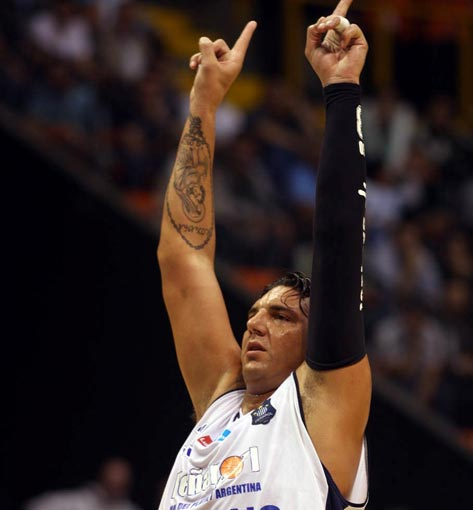
- González wearing the Peñarol jersey

Atenas
- Position: Center
- League: Argentine League

Personal information
- Born: January 28, 1978 (age 48) Lanús, Buenos Aires Province, Argentina
- Listed height: 6 ft 11 in (2.11 m)
- Listed weight: 275 lb (125 kg)

Career information
- Playing career: 1996–present

Career history
- 1996–1998: Gimnasia (CR)
- 1998: Gimnasia (LP)
- 1998–2000: Deportivo San Andrés
- 2000–2002: Libertad
- 2002–2003: Aguada BC
- 2003–2005: Basket Rimini Crabs
- 2005–2006: Argentino de Junín
- 2006: Baloncesto León
- 2006: Carife Ferrara
- 2006: Al-Ittihad BC
- 2006–2007: Regatas
- 2007: Trotamundos
- 2007–2009: Peñarol
- 2009–2011: Quimsa
- 2011: Quilmes de Mar del Plata
- 2012: Atenas de Córdoba

Career highlights
- Super 8 Tournament MVP (2005); Argentine League All-Star Game MVP (2009); Liga Nacional de Básquet rebounding leader (2003)
Medals
Men's basketball
Representing Argentina
Summer Olympic Games
| Bronze medal – third place | 2008 Beijing |
FIBA Diamond Ball
| Gold medal – first place | 2008 Nanjing |
FIBA AmeriCup
| Silver medal – second place | 2005 Santo Domingo |
| Silver medal – second place | 2007 Las Vegas |
| Bronze medal – third place | 2009 Puerto Rico |
FIBA South American Championship
| Silver medal – second place | 2003 Montevideo |
| Gold medal – first place | 2004 Rio de Janeiro |
| Gold medal – first place | 2008 Puerto Montt |
| Silver medal – second place | 2010 Neiva |

Román Javier González (El Chuzo, El Gigante (The Giant), El Gordo (The Fat Man), born January 28, 1978, in Lanús, Buenos Aires Province, Argentina) is an Argentine-Italian professional basketball player. He is a 2.11 m (6 ft 11 in), 125 kg (276 lb) center. González has dual Argentine and Italian citizenship.

== Professional career ==
González is widely reputed to be a globetrotter, as he cannot settle with a team for a long period of time. González has played in the following leagues: Argentine First Division, Argentine Second Division, Bolivian League, Uruguayan League, Italian Second Division, Spanish Second Division, Saudi Arabian League, Venezuelan League, and the Dominican Republic League. Having started his career in 1996, González debuted in Argentina with Gimnasia y Esgrima Comodoro Rivadavia, averaging 2.6 points per game in 7 games. Continuing with Gimnasia in the 1997–98 season, he only averaged 0.8 points per game in 28 games. In 1998, González signed with San Andres of the TNA League (Argentine Second Division), where he played until 2000.

González signed with Libertad de Sunchales in August 2000. There he went on to win several honors with that team, including one South American Championship in 2002, averaging 11.1 points in 49 games. In 2002, González had a short spell in the Bolivian League club Real Santa Cruz, but he made a comeback to Libertad for the 2002–03 season; averaging 20.2 points in 20 games played. However, González left Libertad in 2003, due to an undisciplined record. He signed with the Uruguayan League club Aguada BC in March 2003, where he averaged 19.3 points per game in 16 games. Therefore, he was regarded as one of the best players in the Uruguayan League in 2003, along with his fellow Argentine national basketball team teammate Paolo Quinteros.

Later that year, González signed a contract with the Basket Crabs Rimini of the Italian Second Division. It was the first time González played in Europe. There too, he was successful with his team, averaging 11.3 points in 35 games in 2003-04 and 14.8 points in 33 games in the 2004–05 season. González helped Rimini to reach the quarterfinals of the league both seasons. González, having claimed that he had declined the chance to continue in Italy, left the team after the 2004–5 season; and returned to Argentina.

González debuted with Argentino Atletico de Junin in September 2005. In 44 games he averaged 18.1 points per game. His performance in that team was stellar, as he led Argentino de Junin to a second-place finish at the 2005 Super 8 Tournament (for Argentine clubs). He was one of the best players on the team and in turn he named was the MVP of that year's Super 8 competition.

2006 was a roundabout year for González, as he played for five different clubs during that year.

== National team career ==
González is also a member of the senior men's Argentine national basketball team. With Argentina's senior national team, he won silver medals at both the 2005 FIBA Americas Championship and the 2007 FIBA Americas Championship. He also won bronze medals at both the 2008 Olympic Basketball Tournament and the 2009 FIBA Americas Championship.

== Personal ==
González was born in Lanús, but when he was young, he moved to Puerto Madryn, and then to Punta Alta. He played for some time with Manu Ginóbili in Bahiense del Norte. He is married to Raxanne, with whom he has two children.

His son is also named Román. He has vacationed in the Dominican Republic.

== Awards and accomplishments ==
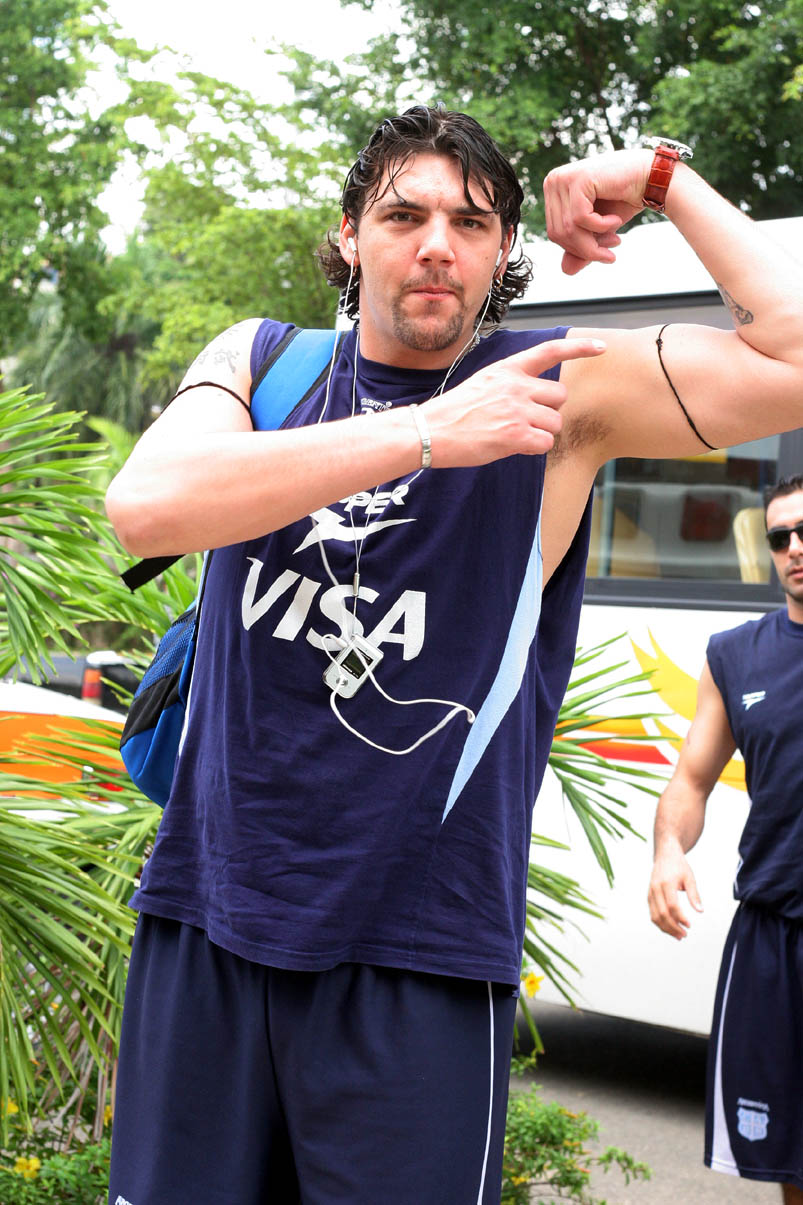
González with the Argentine national team.

=== Pro career ===
- 2× South American League Champion: (2002, 2010)
- Super 8 Tournament MVP: (2005)
- FIBA Americas League Champion: (2008)
- Argentine League All-Star Game MVP: (2009)
- Super 8 Tournament Champion: (2009)
- Argentine Cup Champion: (2009)

=== Argentine national team ===
- 2003 South American Championship: Silver
- 2004 South American Championship: Gold
- 2005 FIBA Americas Championship: Silver
- 2007 FIBA Americas Championship: Silver
- 2008 South American Championship: Gold
- 2008 FIBA Diamond Ball Tournament: Gold
- 2008 Summer Olympic Games: Bronze
- 2009 FIBA Americas Championship: Bronze
- 2010 South American Championship: Silver
