= Basketball at the 2008 Summer Olympics =

17th Olympic Basketball Tournament
- Beijing 2008

Tournament details
- Olympics: 2008 Summer Olympics
- Host nation: China
- City: Beijing
- Venue: Beijing Olympic Basketball Gymnasium
- Duration: August 9–24, 2008

Men's tournament
- Teams: 12
Medals
Gold medalists	United States
Silver medalists	Spain
Bronze medalists	Argentina

Women's tournament
- Teams: 12
Medals
Gold medalists	United States
Silver medalists	Australia
Bronze medalists	Russia

Official website
- www.olympicbasketball.fiba.com

Tournaments
← Athens 2004	London 2012 →

Basketball at the 2008 Summer Olympics was the seventeenth appearance of the sport of basketball as an official Olympic medal event. It was held from 9 August to 24 August 2008. Competitions were held at the Wukesong Indoor Stadium in Beijing, China.

== Medalists ==
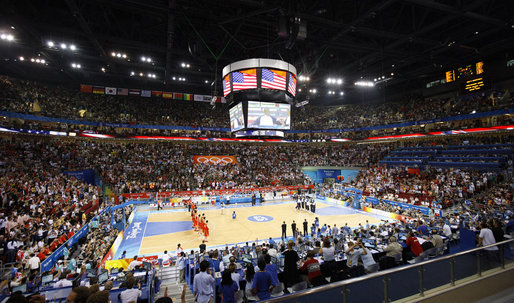
Beijing Wukesong Arena, basketball venue for the 2008 Summer Olympics

Event	Gold	Silver	Bronze
Men	United States Carmelo Anthony; Carlos Boozer; Chris Bosh; Kobe Bryant; Dwight Howard; LeBron James; Jason Kidd; Deron Williams; Chris Paul; Tayshaun Prince; Michael Redd; Dwyane Wade	Spain José Calderón; Rudy Fernández; Jorge Garbajosa; Marc Gasol; Pau Gasol; Carlos Jiménez; Raúl López; Álex Mumbrú; Juan Carlos Navarro; Felipe Reyes; Berni Rodríguez; Ricky Rubio	Argentina Carlos Delfino; Manu Ginóbili; Román González; Juan Pedro Gutiérrez; Leonardo Gutiérrez; Federico Kammerichs; Andrés Nocioni; Fabricio Oberto; Pablo Prigioni; Antonio Porta; Paolo Quinteros; Luis Scola
Women	United States Seimone Augustus; Sue Bird; Tamika Catchings; Sylvia Fowles; Kara Lawson; Lisa Leslie; DeLisha Milton-Jones; Candace Parker; Cappie Pondexter; Katie Smith; Diana Taurasi; Tina Thompson	Australia Suzy Batkovic; Tully Bevilaqua; Rohanee Cox; Hollie Grima; Kristi Harrower; Lauren Jackson; Erin Phillips; Emma Randall; Jenni Screen; Belinda Snell; Laura Summerton; Penny Taylor	Russia Svetlana Abrosimova; Becky Hammon; Marina Karpunina; Ilona Korstin; Marina Kuzina; Ekaterina Lisina; Irina Osipova; Oxana Rakhmatulina; Tatiana Shchegoleva; Irina Sokolovskaya; Maria Stepanova; Natalia Vodopyanova

=== Medal count ===
Rank	Nation	Gold	Silver	Bronze	Total
1	United States	2	0	0	2
2	Australia	0	1	0	1
2	Spain	0	1	0	1
4	Argentina	0	0	1	1
4	Russia	0	0	1	1
Totals (5 entries)		2	2	2	6

== Flag bearers ==
Basketball players that carried their flags at the opening ceremony were Yao Ming (for the People's Republic of China), Šarūnas Jasikevičius (for Lithuania), Dirk Nowitzki (for Germany), Andrei Kirilenko (for the Russian Federation), and Manu Ginóbili (for Argentina).

== Events ==
Two sets of medals were awarded in the following events:

- Basketball – Men
- Basketball – Women

== Qualification ==
A NOC may enter one men's team with 12 players and one women's team with 12 players. The reigning world champions and the host country qualify automatically, as do the winners of the five continental championships (plus the men's runners-up from Europe and the Americas).

The best teams from the continental championships that did not automatically qualify participated in the FIBA World Olympic Qualifying Tournament or FIBA World Olympic Qualifying Tournament for Women to determine the final spots in Beijing.

Italicized teams qualified via the wildcard tournaments.

=== Basketball – Men ===
Africa	Americas	Asia	Europe	Oceania	Automatic qualifiers
Angola	United States; Argentina	Iran	Russia; Lithuania; Croatia; Greece; Germany	Australia	Spain – World champions China – Olympic hosts

=== Basketball – Women ===
Africa	Americas	Asia	Europe	Oceania	Automatic qualifiers
Mali	United States; Brazil	South Korea	Russia; Spain; Czech Rep. Latvia; Belarus	New Zealand	Australia – World champions China – Olympic hosts

== Format ==
- Twelve teams are split into two preliminary round groups of six teams each.
- The top four teams from both groups qualify for the knockout stage.
- Fifth-placed teams from both groups are ranked 9th–10th by basis of their records.
- Sixth-placed teams from both groups are ranked 11th–12th by basis of their records.
- In the quarterfinals, the matchups are as follows: A1 vs. B4, A2 vs. B3, A3 vs. B2 and A4 vs. B1.
  - The eliminated teams at the quarterfinals are ranked 5th–8th by basis of their preliminary round records
- The winning teams from the quarterfinals meet in the semifinals as follows: A1/B4 vs. A3/B2 and A2/B3 vs. A4/B1.
- The winning teams from the semifinals contest the gold medal. The losing teams contest the bronze.

Tie-breaking criteria:

1. Head to head results
2. Goal average (not the goal difference) between the tied teams
3. Goal average of the tied teams for all teams in its group

== Calendar ==
Preliminary round	Quarterfinals	Semifinals	M	Event finals

August	9th S	10th S	11th M	12th T	13th W	14th T	15th F	16th S	17th S	18th M	19th T	20th W	21st T	22nd F	23rd S	24th S	Gold medals
Men																M	1
Women															M		1

== Rosters ==
Each team is limited to twelve players on its roster.

== Men ==
=== Preliminary round ===
Qualified for the quarterfinals

The four best teams from each group advanced to the quarterfinal round.

==== Group A ====
Team	W	L	PF	PA	PD	Pts
Lithuania	4	1	425	400	+25	9
Argentina	4	1	425	361	+64	9
Croatia	3	2	399	380	+19	8
Australia	3	2	457	405	+52	8
Russia	1	4	387	406	−19	6
Iran	0	5	323	464	−141	5

August 10, 2008
Russia	71 – 49	Iran
Lithuania	79 – 75	Argentina
Australia	82 – 97	Croatia
August 12, 2008
Iran	67 – 99	Lithuania
Croatia	85 – 78	Russia
Argentina	85 – 68	Australia
August 14, 2008
Australia	106 – 68	Iran
Lithuania	86 – 79	Russia
Argentina	77 – 53	Croatia
August 16, 2008
Russia	80 – 95	Australia
Croatia	73 – 86	Lithuania
Iran	82 – 97	Argentina
August 18, 2008
Iran	57 – 91	Croatia
Australia	106 – 75	Lithuania
Argentina	91 – 79	Russia

==== Group B ====
Team	W	L	PF	PA	PD	Pts
United States	5	0	515	354	+161	10
Spain	4	1	418	369	+49	9
Greece	3	2	415	375	+40	8
China	2	3	366	400	−34	7
Germany	1	4	330	390	−60	6
Angola	0	5	321	477	−156	5

2008-08-10
Germany	95 – 66	Angola
Spain	81 – 66	Greece
United States	101 – 70	China
2008-08-12
Greece	87 – 64	Germany
China	75 – 85 (OT)	Spain
Angola	76 – 97	United States
2008-08-14
Germany	59 – 72	Spain
Angola	68 – 85	China
United States	92 – 69	Greece
2008-08-16
Greece	102 – 61	Angola
China	59 – 55	Germany
Spain	82 – 119	United States
2008-08-18
Greece	91 – 77	China
Angola	50 – 98	Spain
United States	106 – 57	Germany

=== Tournament bracket ===
Quarterfinals (2008-08-20)
A2	Argentina	80
B3	Greece	78
B1	United States	116
A4	Australia	85
B2	Spain	72
A3	Croatia	59
A1	Lithuania	94
B4	China	68

Semifinals (2008-08-22)
A2	Argentina	81
B1	United States	101
B2	Spain	91
A1	Lithuania	86

Gold medal game (2008-08-24)
B1	United States	118
B2	Spain	107
Bronze medal game
A2	Argentina	87
A1	Lithuania	75

== Women ==
=== Preliminary round ===
Qualified for the quarterfinals

The four best teams from each group advanced to the quarterfinal round.

==== Group A ====
Team	W	L	PF	PA	PD	Pts
Australia	5	0	349	264	+85	10
Russia	4	1	278	258	+20	9
Belarus	2	3	320	332	−12	7
South Korea	2	3	352	360	−8	7
Latvia	1	4	266	315	−49	6
Brazil	1	4	337	354	−17	6

2008-08-09
Belarus	64 – 83	Australia
South Korea	68 – 62 (OT)	Brazil
Latvia	57 – 62	Russia
2008-08-11
South Korea	72 – 77	Russia
Latvia	57 – 79	Belarus
Australia	80 – 65	Brazil
2008-08-13
Belarus	65 – 71	Russia
Brazil	78 – 79	Latvia
South Korea	62 – 90	Australia
2008-08-15
Latvia	73 – 96	Australia
Russia	74 – 64	Brazil
South Korea	53 – 63	Belarus
2008-08-17
Australia	75 – 55	Russia
South Korea	72 – 68	Latvia
Brazil	68 – 53	Belarus

==== Group B ====
Team	W	L	PF	PA	PD	Pts
United States	5	0	491	276	+215	10
China	4	1	358	346	+12	9
Spain	3	2	357	324	+33	8
Czech Republic	2	3	346	356	−10	7
New Zealand	1	4	320	423	−103	6
Mali	0	5	255	402	−147	5

2008-08-09
Mali	72 – 76	New Zealand
China	67 – 64	Spain
Czech Republic	57 – 97	United States
2008-08-11
New Zealand	62 – 85	Spain
Czech Republic	81 – 47	Mali
China	63 – 108	United States
2008-08-13
Spain	74 – 55	Czech Republic
China	80 – 63	New Zealand
Mali	41 – 97	United States
2008-08-15
Czech Republic	90 – 59	New Zealand
China	69 –48	Mali
United States	93–55	Spain
2008-08-17
Mali	47 – 79	Spain
China	79 – 63	Czech Republic
New Zealand	60 – 96	United States

=== Tournament bracket ===
Quarterfinals (2008-08-19)
A2	Russia	84
B3	Spain	65
B1	United States	104
A4	South Korea	60
B2	China	77
A3	Belarus	62
A1	Australia	79
B4	Czech Republic	46

Semifinals (2008-08-21)
A2	Russia	52
B1	United States	67
B2	China	56
A1	Australia	90

Gold medal game (2008-08-23)
B1	United States	92
A1	Australia	65
Bronze medal game
A2	Russia	94
B2	China	81

== Final standings ==
Rank	Men				Women			
Rank	Team	Pld	W	L	Team	Pld	W	L
1st place, gold medalist(s)	United States	8	8	0	United States	8	8	0
2nd place, silver medalist(s)	Spain	8	6	2	Australia	8	7	1
3rd place, bronze medalist(s)	Argentina	8	6	2	Russia	8	6	2
4th	Lithuania	8	5	3	China	8	5	3
Eliminated at the quarterfinals
5th	Greece	6	3	3	Spain	6	3	3
6th	Croatia	6	3	3	Belarus	6	2	4
7th	Australia	6	3	3	Czech Republic	6	2	4
8th	China	6	2	4	South Korea	6	2	4
Preliminary round 5th placers
9th	Russia	5	1	4	Latvia	5	1	4
10th	Germany	5	1	4	New Zealand	5	1	4
Preliminary round 6th placers
11th	Iran	5	0	5	Brazil	5	1	4
12th	Angola	5	0	5	Mali	5	0	5

== See also ==
- Wheelchair basketball at the 2008 Summer Paralympics
