= Paolo Quinteros =

Argentine-Italian basketball player

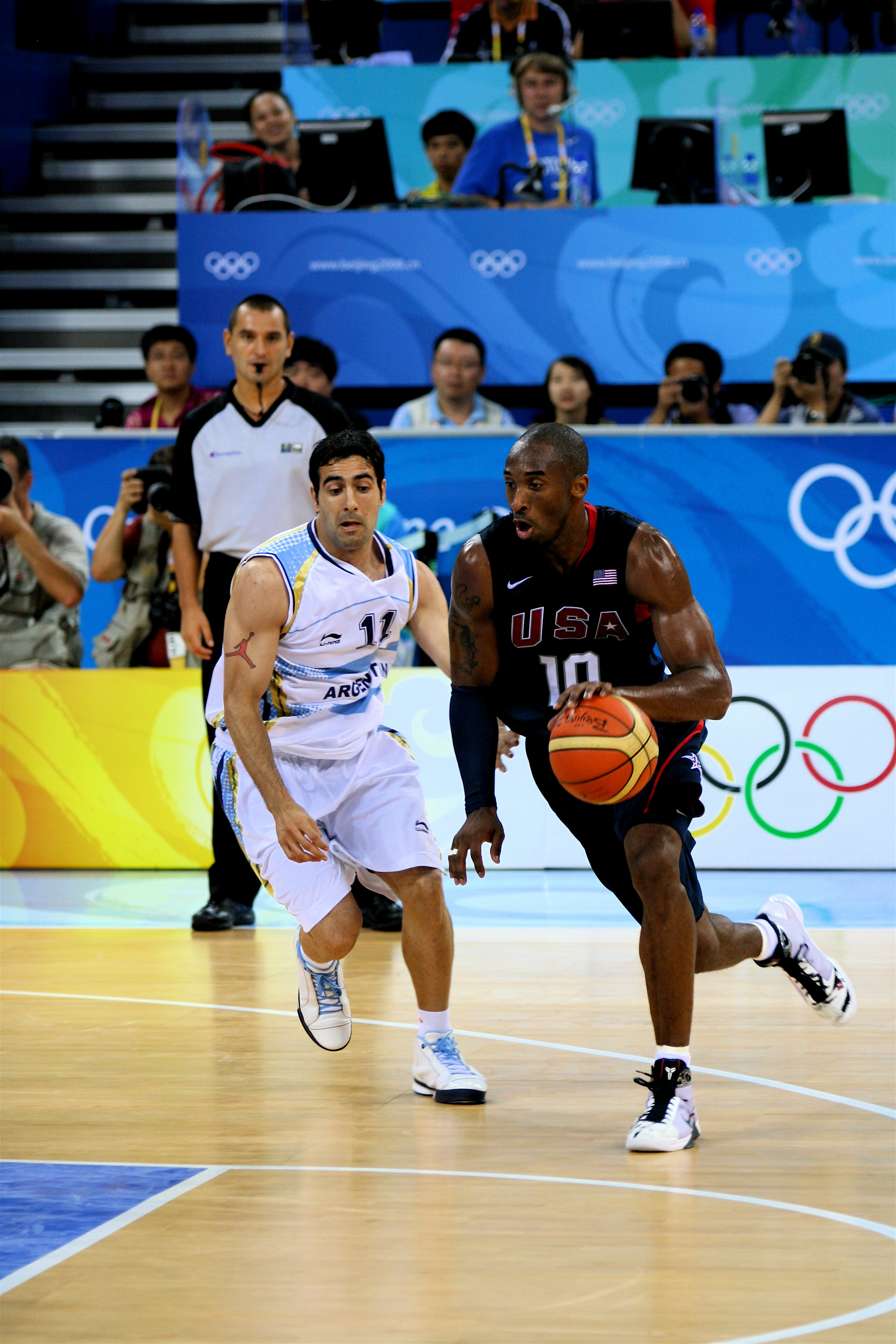
- Quinteros (left) in the 2008 Summer Olympic Games.

Personal information
- Born: January 15, 1979 (age 47) Colón, Entre Ríos, Argentina

Career information
- Playing career: 1996–2022
- Position: Point guard / shooting guard

Career history
- 1996–1997: Club Parque Sur
- 1997–2000: Club La Unión
- 2000–2002: Estudiantes Olavarria
- 2002–2003: Trouville
- 2003–2006: Boca Juniors
- 2006–2007: León Caja España
- 2007–2011: CAI Zaragoza
- 2011–2022: Regatas Corrientes

Career highlights
- FIBA South American League MVP (2012); South American Club Championship MVP (2004); Argentine League MVP (2013); Argentine League Finals MVP (2013); Argentine League Top Scorer (2005); 2× Argentine League All-Star Game MVP (2005, 2012); Super 8 Tournament MVP (2012); Super 8 Tournament Top Scorer (2012); Spanish Prince's Cup MVP (2007)
Medals
Men's basketball
Representing Argentina
Summer Olympic Games
Bronze medal – third place	2008 Beijing
FIBA Diamond Ball
Gold medal – first place	2008 Nanjing
FIBA AmeriCup
Silver medal – second place	2005 Santo Domingo
Silver medal – second place	2007 Las Vegas
Bronze medal – third place	2009 Puerto Rico
Gold medal – first place	2011 Mar del Plata
FIBA South American Championship
Silver medal – second place	2003 Montevideo
Bronze medal – third place	2006 Caracas
Gold medal – first place	2008 Puerto Montt
FIBA Stanković Cup
Silver medal – second place	2005 Beijing

Paolo Alfredo Quinteros (born January 15, 1979) is an Argentine-Italian former professional basketball player. He plays mainly at the shooting guard position, but he can also play at the point guard position.

== Professional career ==
Quinteros began his professional career in the Argentine 2nd Division with Club Parque Sur in 1996. He then joined the top Argentine League club La Unión in 1997. He then moved to the Argentine League club Estudiantes Olavarria in 2000. In 2002, he moved to the Uruguayan League team Club Trouville in Montevideo.

He then returned to the Argentine League to play with the Boca Juniors in 2003. He joined León Caja España of the Spanish Second Division in 2006. He moved to Basket Zaragoza 2002 of the Spanish Second Division in the year 2007.

Quinteros was named the South American Club Championship MVP in 2004, and the Spanish Prince's Cup (Spanish 2nd level Cup) MVP in 2007. He played in the top-tier level division of Spain, the Spanish ACB League, for the first time in the 2008–09 season.

== National team career ==
Quinteros is also a member of the senior men's Argentine national basketball team. With Argentina's senior national team, he won silver medals at both the 2005 FIBA AmeriCup and the 2007 FIBA AmeriCup. He also won bronze medals at both the 2008 Summer Olympic Games and the 2009 FIBA AmeriCup.

He also won the gold medal at the 2011 FIBA AmeriCup.

== Awards and accomplishments ==
=== Pro career ===
- 2× FIBA South American League Champion: (2001, 2012)
- 3× Argentine League Champion: (2001, 2004, 2013)
- 2× Argentine League Triples Tournament Champion: (2002, 2006)
- 2× Torneo Top 4: Winner (2002, 2004)
- 3× South American Club Championship Champion: (2004, 2005, 2006)
- South American Club Championship MVP: (2004)
- 3× Argentine Cup Winner: (2004, 2005, 2006)
- 2× Argentine League All-Star Game MVP: (2005, 2012)
- 4× Argentine League Best Quintet: (2005, 2006, 2013, 2014)
- Argentine League Top Scorer: (2005)
- Spanish Prince's Cup (Spanish 2nd Cup) Winner: (2007)
- Spanish Prince's Cup (Spanish 2nd Cup) MVP: (2007)
- 2× Spanish Second Division Champion: (2008, 2010)
- Super 8 Tournament Champion: (2012)
- Super 8 Tournament Top Scorer: (2012)
- Super 8 Tournament MVP: (2012)
- FIBA South American League MVP: (2012)
- Argentine League MVP: (2013)
- Argentine League Finals MVP: (2013)

=== Argentine senior national team ===
- 2003 FIBA South American Championship: Silver
- 2005 FIBA Mini World Cup: Silver
- 2005 FIBA AmeriCup: Silver
- 2006 FIBA South American Championship: Bronze
- 2007 FIBA AmeriCup: Silver
- 2008 FIBA South American Championship: Gold
- 2008 FIBA Diamond Ball: Gold
- 2008 Summer Olympic Games: Bronze
- 2009 FIBA AmeriCup: Bronze
- 2011 FIBA AmeriCup: Gold
