= Leonardo Gutiérrez =

Argentine basketball player and coach

Leo Gutiérrez
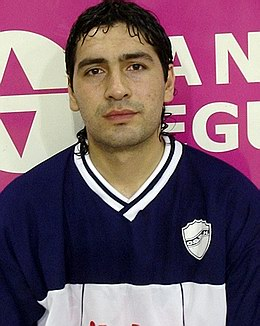
- Gutiérrez, in 2008.

Ciclista Olímpico
- Position: Head coach

Personal information
- Born: May 16, 1978 (age 48) Marcos Juárez, Argentina
- Listed height: 6 ft 7 in (2.01 m)
- Listed weight: 252 lb (114 kg)

Career information
- Playing career: 1993–2017

Career history

Playing
- 1993–1998: Olimpia Venado Tuerto
- 1998–2002: Atenas de Córdoba
- 2002–2003: Inca
- 2003: Paisas Antioquia de Medellin
- 2003–2004: Obras Sanitarias
- 2004–2006: Ben Hur de Rafaela
- 2006–2008: Boca Juniors
- 2008–2009: Atenas de Cordoba
- 2009–2017: Peñarol

Coaching
- 2019–present: Ciclista Olímpico

Career highlights
- FIBA South American League MVP (2006); 2× InterLeagues MVP (2010, 2012); 4× Argentine League MVP (2005, 2006, 2008, 2010); 4× Argentine League Finals MVP (2005, 2007, 2010, 2011); Argentine League Top Scorer (2008); Super 8 Tournament MVP (2009); Super 8 Tournament Top Scorer (2009); Argentine All-Star Game MVP (2006)
Medals
Men's basketball
Representing Argentina
Summer Olympic Games
Gold medal – first place	2004 Athens
Bronze medal – third place	2008 Beijing
FIBA World Cup
Silver medal – second place	2002 Indianapolis
FIBA Diamond Ball
Gold medal – first place	2008 Nanjing
FIBA AmeriCup
Gold medal – first place	2001 Neuquén
Silver medal – second place	2003 San Juan
Silver medal – second place	2005 Santo Domingo
Silver medal – second place	2007 Las Vegas
Bronze medal – third place	2009 San Juan
Gold medal – first place	2011 Mar del Plata
FIBA South American Championship
Gold medal – first place	2001 Valdivia
Gold medal – first place	2004 Rio de Janeiro
Gold medal – first place	2012 Resistencia
Silver medal – second place	2003 Montevideo
Bronze medal – third place	2006 Caracas
Goodwill Games
Silver medal – second place	2001 Brisbane

Leonardo "Leo" Martín Gutiérrez (born May 16, 1978) is an Argentine former professional basketball coach and former player. He played as a power forward.

== Professional career ==
Gutiérrez had a career average of 13.1 points per game in the top-tier level Liga Nacional de Básquetbol, while playing in 1,106 games over 23 seasons. He scored a total of 14,531 points in the Argentina top League. He is also first all-time in games played in the Argentine League, and third all-time in total points scored.

He holds the record for Liga Nacional de Básquet as defending the most Argentine League championships won, at 10.

== National team career ==
Gutiérrez defended Argentina, bringing home from FIBA Americas Championships: a gold medal in 2001 and 2011, silver medals at the 2002, 2003, 2005 and 2007, and a bronze medal in 2009.

He defended Argentina in Summer Olympic Games bringing home medals in 2004, and a bronze medal at the 2008.

== Personal life ==
Gutiérrez met his wife at Venado Tuerto, while playing for Olimpia. He married his longtime fiancée on June 17, 2006. They have two children. The first child in 1999, and his daughter, Mora, in 2009.

== Awards and accomplishments ==
=== Pro career ===
- 2× FIBA South American League Champion: (1996, 2006)
- 10× Argentine League Champion: (1996, 1999, 2002, 2005, 2007, 2009, 2010, 2011, 2012, 2014)
- Argentine League Dunk Tournament Champion: (1998)
- 13× Argentine League All-Star Game: (2000, 2001, 2002, 2004, 2005, 2006, 2007, 2008, 2009, 2010, 2011, 2012, 2013)
- 4× Argentine League MVP: (2005, 2006, 2008, 2010)
- 6× Argentine League Ideal Quintet Team: (2005, 2006, 2008, 2010, 2012, 2014)
- 4× Argentine League Finals MVP: (2005, 2007, 2010, 2011)
- 3× Argentine Cup Winner: (2006, 2008, 2010)
- Argentine All-Star Game MVP: (2006)
- South American Club Championship Champion: (2006)
- FIBA South American League MVP: (2006)
- Argentine League Top Scorer: (2008)
- 3× Super 8 Tournament Winner: (2009, 2011, 2013)
- Super 8 Tournament Top Scorer: (2009)
- Super 8 Tournament MVP: (2009)
- Konex Award Merit Diploma - One of five best basketball player from last decade in Argentina: (2010)
- 2× InterLeagues Tournament Champion: (2010, 2012)
- InterLeagues MVP: (2010)
- FIBA Americas League Champion: (2010)
- Argentine League Triples Tournament Champion: (2012)

=== Argentina national team ===
- 2001 FIBA South American Championship: Gold
- 2001 FIBA Americas Championship: Gold
- 2002 FIBA World Championship: Silver
- 2003 FIBA South American Championship: Silver
- 2003 FIBA Americas Championship: Silver
- 2004 FIBA South American Championship: Gold
- 2004 Summer Olympic Games: Gold
- 2005 Stanković Continental Champions' Cup: Silver
- 2005 FIBA Americas Championship: Silver
- 2006 FIBA South American Championship: Bronze
- 2007 FIBA Americas Championship: Silver
- 2008 FIBA Diamond Ball Tournament: Gold
- 2008 Summer Olympic Games: Bronze
- 2009 FIBA Americas Championship: Bronze
- 2011 FIBA Americas Championship: Gold
- 2012 FIBA South American Championship: Gold
