= Facundo Campazzo =

Argentine basketball player (born 1991)

- Campazzo with Real Madrid in 2026

No. 7 – Real Madrid
- Position: Point guard
- League: Liga ACB; EuroLeague

Personal information
- Born: 23 March 1991 (age 35) Córdoba, Argentina
- Listed height: 5 ft 10 in (1.78 m)
- Listed weight: 185 lb (84 kg)

Career information
- NBA draft: 2013: undrafted
- Playing career: 2008–present

Career history
- 2008–2014: Peñarol
- 2014–2020: Real Madrid
- 2015–2017: →UCAM Murcia
- 2020–2022: Denver Nuggets
- 2022: Dallas Mavericks
- 2022–2023: Crvena zvezda
- 2023–present: Real Madrid

Career highlights
- 2× EuroLeague champion (2015, 2018); All-EuroLeague First Team (2024); EuroLeague SuperCup champion (2026); FIBA Americas League champion (2010); All-FIBA Americas League First Team (2013); All-FIBA Americas League Team Second Team (2015); EuroCup steals leader (2017); 5× Liga ACB champion (2015, 2018, 2019, 2024, 2025); 3× Spanish Cup winner (2015, 2020, 2024); 5× Spanish Supercup winner (2014, 2018–2020, 2023); Liga ACB MVP (2024); 2× Liga ACB Finals MVP (2019, 2025); 3× All-Liga ACB First Team (2019, 2020, 2024); 2× All-Liga ACB Second Team (2017, 2018); Liga ACB Most Spectacular Player (2017); 3× Liga ACB steals leader (2016–2018); 2× Spanish Cup MVP (2020, 2024); 3× Spanish Supercup MVP (2019, 2020, 2023); Serbian league champion (2023); Serbian league steals leader (2023); Serbian Cup winner (2023); All-ABA League Team (2023); 2× InterLeagues Tournament champion (2010, 2012); 4× LNB champion (2010–2012, 2014); Argentine Challenge Cup winner (2010); 3× Argentine Super 8 Tournament winner (2009, 2011, 2013); Argentine Cup winner (2010); 2× LNB Finals MVP (2012, 2014); 3× All-LNB Team (2012–2014); 3× LNB assists leader (2012–2014); 2× LNB steals leader (2013, 2014); 3× LNB All-Domestic Players Team (2012–2014); LNB Most Improved Player (2012); LNB Revelation of the Year (2010); 3× LNB All-Star (2011–2013); LNB All-Star Skills Challenge winner (2012); 2× Argentine Super 8 Tournament MVP (2011, 2013); Argentine Cup MVP (2010)
- Stats at NBA.com
- Stats at Basketball Reference
Medals
Event	1st	2nd	3rd
FIBA World Cup	0	1	0
FIBA AmeriCup	1	2	1
Pan American Games	1	0	0
FIBA South American Championship	1	1	0
South American Games	1	0	0
Total	4	4	1
Men's basketball
Representing Argentina
World Cup
Silver medal – second place	2019 China	
FIBA AmeriCup
Gold medal – first place	2022 Brazil	
Silver medal – second place	2015 Mexico	
Silver medal – second place	2017 Argentina	
Bronze medal – third place	2013 Venezuela	
Pan American Games
Gold medal – first place	2019 Lima	Team
FIBA South American Championship
Gold medal – first place	2012 Argentina	
Silver medal – second place	2014 Venezuela	
South American Games
Gold medal – first place	2014 Chile	Team

Facundo "Facu" Campazzo Avedano (born 23 March 1991) is an Argentine professional basketball player for Real Madrid of the Spanish Liga ACB and the EuroLeague. At a height of 5 ft 10 in (1.78 m) tall, he plays at the point guard position. He is also a member of the senior Argentina national basketball team.

As a member of Real Madrid, Campazzo earned an All-EuroLeague First Team selection in 2024 and won two EuroLeague championships in 2015 and 2018. While representing Argentina, he played a crucial role on the way of a silver medal at the 2019 FIBA World Cup.

== Professional career ==
=== Peñarol (2008–2014) ===
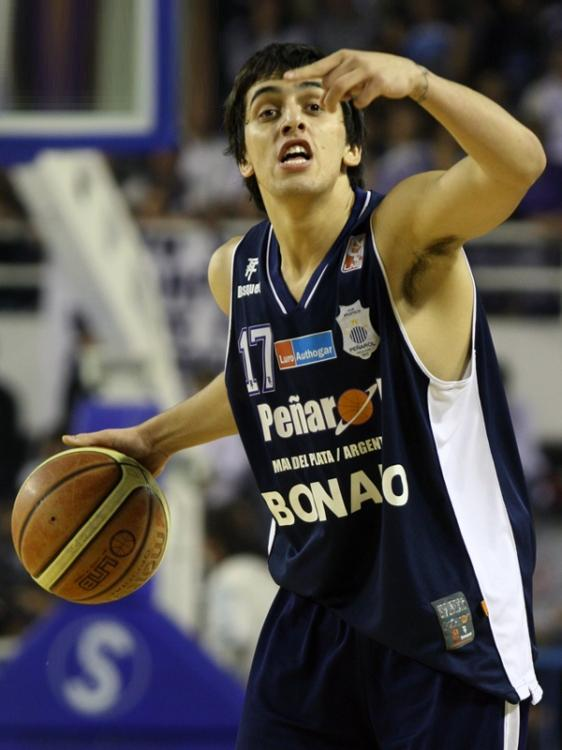
Campazzo with Peñarol in 2009

Campazzo began playing for the Argentine League club Peñarol de Mar del Plata in 2008. With Peñarol, he won the following tournaments: the Argentine League championship four times (2010, 2011, 2012, 2014), the Argentine Cup (2010), the Argentine Challenge Cup (2010), the Argentine Super 8 Tournament three times (2009, 2011, 2013), the InterLeagues Tournament twice (2010, 2012), and the FIBA Americas League championship (2010).

He was named the Argentine League Revelation of the Year and the Argentine Cup MVP in 2010. He was named the Argentine Super 8 Tournament MVP in 2011 and 2013 and the Argentine League Most Improved Player in 2012. He was also named the Argentine League Finals MVP in 2012 and 2014.

=== Real Madrid (2014–2020) ===
On 30 August 2014, Campazzo signed a three-year deal with the Spanish League club Real Madrid. In the 2014–15 season, Real Madrid won the EuroLeague championship, after defeating the Greek club Olympiacos, by a score of 78–59, in the league's final game. Real Madrid eventually finished the season by winning the Spanish ACB League's 2014–15 season's league playoff finals, after a 3–0 series sweep in the finals series against Barcelona. By winning that title, Real Madrid also won the triple crown.

On 20 August 2015, Campazzo was loaned to Spanish club UCAM Murcia. He spent both the 2015–16 ACB season, and the 2016–17 ACB season with Murcia. He returned to Real Madrid for the 2017–18 ACB season.

In May 2018, Real Madrid won the 2017–18 EuroLeague season's championship after defeating the Turkish club Fenerbahçe Doğuş in the finals, by a score of 85–80. Over 30 EuroLeague games played, Campazzo averaged 7.9 points, 4.5 assists and 2.4 rebounds per game. On 24 May 2018, he finished in fourth place in voting for the Spanish Liga ACB's MVP award of the 2017–18 season.

On 26 June 2018, he re-signed to a three-year deal with Real Madrid. On 3 May 2019, he was named the EuroLeague MVP for the month of April. In the third place game of the 2019 EuroLeague Final Four, Campazzo set an all-time record for assists in a Final Four game, with 15. He surpassed Terrell McIntyre's previous record from 2008.

On 6 February 2020, Campazzo joined Stefan Jović at the top of the EuroLeague's all-time single-game assists chart after he dished out 19 assists in a 103–97 win over the German club Alba Berlin.

=== Denver Nuggets (2020–2022) ===
On 30 November 2020, Campazzo was signed by the Denver Nuggets of the NBA to a multiyear contract. On 13 April 2022, Campazzo was suspended for Game 1 of the first round of the 2022 NBA playoffs. The suspension stemmed from him shoving Lakers guard Wayne Ellington in a game three days earlier.

=== Dallas Mavericks (2022) ===
On 18 October 2022, Campazzo signed a contract with the Dallas Mavericks. On 28 November 2022, he was waived when the Mavericks signed guard Kemba Walker.

=== Crvena zvezda (2022–2023) ===
On 19 December 2022, Campazzo signed a contract with Serbian team Crvena zvezda.

=== Return to Real Madrid (2023–present) ===
On July 18, 2023, Campazzo made his official return to Real Madrid after three seasons, signing a four-year deal.

On February 18, 2024, Campazzo won his third Spanish Cup with Madrid and was named the tournament's MVP for a second time in his career. He recorded 18 points and 6 assists in the final against Barcelona.

On October 4, 2024, Campazzo protested a late no-call and was ejected from the game. His heated reaction was met by his teammates restraining him to avoid further and more intense complaints to the referees. It was announced that he received a one-game suspension and a fine.

== National team career ==
=== Junior national team ===
Campazzo was a member of Argentina's junior national teams. With Argentina's under-16 junior national team, he played at the 2007 FIBA South American Under-16 Championship, where he won a gold medal.

=== Senior national team ===
Campazzo competed for the senior Argentina national basketball team at the 2012 London Summer Olympics. He also played for Argentine teams that won gold medals at the 2012 South American Championship and the 2014 South American Games, silver medals at the 2014 South American Championship, the 2015 FIBA Americas Championship, and the 2017 FIBA AmeriCup, and a bronze medal at the 2013 FIBA Americas Championship. He also played with Argentina at the 2014 FIBA World Cup and at the 2016 Rio Summer Olympics.

He helped Argentina bring home a gold medal from the 2019 Pan American tournament, which was held in Lima, Peru. He also won the silver medal at the 2019 FIBA World Cup.

In 2022, Campazzo won the gold medal in the 2022 FIBA AmeriCup held in Recife, Brazil. He was Argentina's starting point guard in the tournament. After the final game against Brazil, he was named in the All-Tournament Team.

Campazzo was named to the FIBA AmeriCup's All-Tournament Team in 2013, 2017 and 2022.

== Career statistics ==
Legend
GP	Games played	GS	Games started	MPG	Minutes per game
FG%	Field-goal percentage	3P%	3-point field-goal percentage	FT%	Free-throw percentage
RPG	Rebounds per game	APG	Assists per game	SPG	Steals per game
BPG	Blocks per game	PPG	Points per game	PIR	Performance index rating
**Bold**	Career high

=== NBA ===
==== Regular season ====
Year	Team	GP	GS	MPG	FG%	3P%	FT%	RPG	APG	SPG	BPG	PPG
2020–21	Denver	**65**	**19**	**21.9**	**.381**	**.352**	**.879**	**2.1**	**3.6**	**1.2**	.2	**6.1**
2021–22	Denver	**65**	4	18.2	.361	.301	.769	1.8	3.7	1.0	**.4**	5.1
2022–23	Dallas	8	0	6.5	.231	.273	.500	.3	1.1	.8	—	1.3
Career		138	23	19.3	.369	.326	.825	1.8	3.3	1.1	.3	5.3

==== Playoffs ====
Year	Team	GP	GS	MPG	FG%	3P%	FT%	RPG	APG	SPG	BPG	PPG
2021	Denver	**10**	**9**	**27.0**	**.392**	**.396**	**.842**	**3.0**	**4.1**	**1.4**	**.4**	**9.3**
2022	Denver	4	0	3.3	.000	.000	—	.8	.5	—	—	0.0
Career		14	9	20.2	.382	.380	.842	2.4	3.1	1.0	.3	6.6

=== EuroLeague ===
†	Denotes season in which Campazzo won the EuroLeague
*	Led the league

Year	Team	GP	GS	MPG	FG%	3P%	FT%	RPG	APG	SPG	BPG	PPG	PIR
2014–15†	Real Madrid	11	1	8.6	**.476**	.364	.700	.5	2.0	.5	**.1**	2.8	3.0
2017–18†	Real Madrid	30	28	23.1	.396	.376	.833	2.4	4.5	1.4	**.1**	7.9	10.3
2018–19	Real Madrid	34	14	23.6	.385	.374	.893	2.6	5.2	1.6	—	8.7	13.0
2019–20	Real Madrid	28*	27	23.9	.403	.310	.870	2.3	**7.1**	1.4	—	9.9	15.4
2020–21	Real Madrid	10	8	25.7	.380	.275	.826	2.5	6.7	**2.0**	—	9.3	13.5
2022–23	Crvena zvezda	9	7	**28.6**	.436	.333	**.897**	2.8	5.9	1.9	—	**15.0**	**18.7**
2023–24	Real Madrid	37	36	25.3	.452	.322	.866	2.9	6.5	1.3	.0	11.5	16.7
2024–25	Real Madrid	39	33	25.7	.450	.338	.860	**3.1**	6.0	1.0	**.1**	12.0	14.8
2025–26	Real Madrid	**44**	**37**	24.2	.437	**.421**	.844	1.9	5.1	1.1	.0	12.0	14.4
Career		242	191	23.4	.425	.357	.860	2.4	5.6	1.3	.0	10.3	14.3

=== EuroCup ===
Year	Team	GP	GS	MPG	FG%	3P%	FT%	RPG	APG	SPG	BPG	PPG	PIR
2016–17	UCAM Murcia	13	12	30.2	.367	.318	.739	2.7	6.7	2.2	.2	13.2	15.8
Career		13	12	30.2	.367	.318	.739	2.7	6.7	2.2	.2	13.2	15.8

=== FIBA Liga Sudamericana de Baloncesto ===
Year	Team	GP	GS	MPG	FG%	3P%	FT%	RPG	APG	SPG	BPG	PPG
2012–13	Peñarol	**9**	**8**	**31.3**	.430	.436	**.857**	**4.1**	**5.7**	**2.7**	**.1**	13.4
2013–14	Peñarol	3	3	28.5	**.618**	**.500**	.789	2.7	**5.7**	2.0	—	**22.0**
Career		12	11	30.7	.487	.456	.836	3.8	5.7	2.5	.1	15.6

=== Domestic leagues ===
Year	Team	League	GP	MPG	FG%	3P%	FT%	RPG	APG	SPG	BPG	PPG
2008–09	(Argentina) Peñarol	LNB	25	5.0	.273	.241	.500	.6	.5	.3	—	1.4
2009–10	(Argentina) Peñarol	LNB	48	18.9	.376	.352	.731	2.0	1.6	1.4	.5	5.7
2010–11	(Argentina) Peñarol	LNB	57	18.9	.455	.337	.667	2.1	1.9	1.1	.0	6.8
2011–12	(Argentina) Peñarol	LNB	58	31.9	.495	.424	.747	4.4	6.0	2.4	.1	14.1
2012–13	(Argentina) Peñarol	LNB	52	33.1	.453	.302	.737	4.0	6.0	2.4	.1	14.4
2013–14	(Argentina) Peñarol	LNB	51	31.7	.491	.379	.755	4.1	5.9	2.1	.2	16.2
2014–15	(Spain) Real Madrid	ACB	31	12.2	.400	.324	.583	1.0	1.5	.7	—	3.1
2015–16	(Spain) UCAM Murcia	ACB	37	26.5	.397	.337	.778	2.9	5.3	2.0	.2	12.6
2016–17	(Spain) UCAM Murcia	ACB	31	28.5	.392	.310	.802	2.8	5.9	1.6	.0	14.1
2017–18	(Spain) Real Madrid	ACB	33	21.9	.472	.363	.756	1.8	4.0	1.5	.1	9.0
2018–19	(Spain) Real Madrid	ACB	41	23.9	.410	.371	.899	2.7	4.9	1.4	.0	10.4
2019–20	(Spain) Real Madrid	ACB	26	22.6	.427	.410	.897	2.5	5.0	1.1	.0	11.2
2020–21	(Spain) Real Madrid	ACB	10	21.8	.452	.350	.903	2.4	4.6	2.3	—	10.8
2022–23	(Serbia) Crvena zvezda	KLS	2	28.5	.429	.286	.778	2.0	6.0	3.0	—	10.5
2022–23	(Serbia) Crvena zvezda	ABA	24	24.8	.406	.364	.750	2.8	6.5	2.0	.0	13.0
2023–24	(Spain) Real Madrid	ACB	39	23.1	.478	.403	.927	2.3	5.6	1.6	.0	11.7
2024–25	(Spain) Real Madrid	ACB	40	23.2	.479	.358	.876	2.1	4.9	1.5	.0	11.1
2025–26	(Spain) Real Madrid	ACB	31	22.4	.417	.308	.873	1.9	4.6	1.1	.0	9.3

== Awards and accomplishments ==
=== Pro career ===
- FIBA Americas League Champion: 2009–10
- 4× Argentine League Champion: (2010, 2011, 2012, 2014)
- 2× Argentine League Finals MVP: (2012, 2014)
- 3× Argentine Super 8 Tournament Winner: (2009, 2011, 2013)
- 2× Argentine Super 8 Tournament MVP: (2011, 2013)
- 2× InterLeagues Tournament Champion: (2010, 2012)
- Argentine Cup Winner: (2010)
- Argentine Cup MVP: (2010)
- Argentine Challenge Cup Winner: (2010)
- Argentine League Revelation of the Year: (2010)
- 3× Argentine League All-Star: (2011, 2012, 2013)
- 3× Eurobasket.com's Argentine League All-Domestic Players Team: (2012–2014)
- 3× Eurobasket.com's Argentine League All-Defensive Team: (2012–2014)
- 3× Argentine League Ideal Quintet Team: (2012, 2013, 2014)
- Argentine League Most Improved Player: (2012)
- 4× Spanish Supercup Winner: (2014, 2018, 2019, 2020)
- 2× Spanish King's Cup Winner: (2015, 2020)
- 2× EuroLeague Champion: (2015, 2018)
- 3× Spanish League Champion: (2015, 2018, 2019)
- Triple Crown Winner: (2015)
- Eurobasket.com's EuroCup Defensive Player of the Year: (2017)
- 4× All-Spanish League Team:
  - 2× All-Spanish League Second Team: (2017, 2018)
  - 2× All-Spanish League First Team: (2019, 2020)
- Spanish League Most Spectacular Player: (2017)
- EuroLeague's MVP of the Month of April: (2019)
- Spanish League Finals MVP: (2019)
- 2× Spanish Supercup MVP: (2019, 2020)
- Spanish Cup MVP: (2020)

=== Argentina junior national team ===
- 2007 FIBA South American Under-16 Championship: Gold

=== Argentina senior national team ===
- 2012 South American Championship: Gold
- 2013 FIBA Americas Championship: Bronze
- 2013 FIBA Americas Championship: All-Tournament Team
- 2014 South American Games: Gold
- 2014 South American Championship: Silver
- 2015 FIBA Americas Championship: Silver
- 2017 FIBA AmeriCup: Silver
- 2017 FIBA AmeriCup: All-Tournament Team
- 2019 Pan American Games: Gold
- 2019 World Cup: Silver
- 2022 FIBA Americup: Gold
- 2022 FIBA Americup: All-Tournament Team
