= Román González =

Román González may refer to:

- Román González (basketball) (born 1978), Argentine basketball player
- Román González (boxer) (born 1987), Nicaraguan boxer
