= Torneo Súper 8 de Básquet =

Torneo Súper 8
- Founded: 2005
- First season: 2005–06
- Folded: 2014
- Country: Argentina
- Number of teams: 8
- Related competitions: Liga Nacional de Básquet; Copa Argentina
- Last champions: Regatas Corrientes (2nd title)
- Most championships: Peñarol de Mar del Plata (4 titles)

The Torneo Súper 8 de Básquet (English: Super 8 Basketball Tournament) was a professional basketball national domestic cup competition that took place each year between teams from Argentina's top-tier level basketball league, the Liga Nacional de Básquet (LNB).

== Format ==
The Torneo Súper 8 took place during the middle of the season, usually in the month of December, before the Argentine League's year-end recess. It was an 8 team single-elimination knockout tournament, and was held in one arena. It was held under a format similar to that of the Spanish King's Cup. The winner of the tournament received a place in the FIBA South American League.

== History ==
The Torneo Súper 8 tournament began in 2005, and it was the replacement for the earlier Torneo Top 4 (Top 4 Tournament) cup tournament.

== Winners ==
Year Season	Host City	Winner	Runner-up	Top Scorer	MVP
2005; 2005–06	Junín	Club Deportivo Libertad	Argentino de Junín		Román González
2006; 2006–07	Neuquén	Peñarol de Mar del Plata	Boca Juniors		Gabriel Mikulas
2007; 2007–08	Mar del Plata	Club Deportivo Libertad	Regatas Corrientes		Robert Battle
2008; 2008–09	Buenos Aires	Regatas Corrientes	Obras Sanitarias		Federico Kammerichs
2009; 2009–10	Mar del Plata	Peñarol de Mar del Plata	Asociación Deportiva Atenas	Leonardo Gutiérrez	Leonardo Gutiérrez
2010; 2010–11	Formosa	Asociación Deportiva Atenas	Peñarol de Mar del Plata		Miguel Gerlero
2011; 2011–12	Mar del Plata	Peñarol de Mar del Plata	Club Deportivo Libertad		Facundo Campazzo
2012; 2012–13	Corrientes	Regatas Corrientes	Quimsa	Paolo Quinteros	Paolo Quinteros
2013; 2013–14	San Martín	Peñarol de Mar del Plata	Quimsa	Walter Herrmann	Facundo Campazzo
2014; 2014–15	Varias sedes y Santiago del Estero	Quimsa	Obras Sanitarias	Diego García	Nicolás Aguirre

== See also ==
- LNB
- Torneo Top 4
- Copa Argentina
- Torneo InterLigas
