= Francisco Cáffaro =

Argentine basketball player

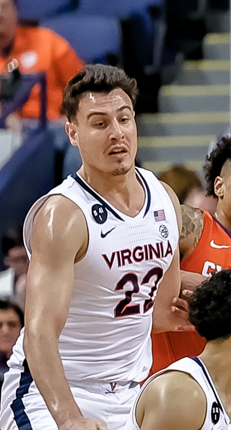
- Cáffaro in 2023

No. 22 – Boca Juniors
- Position: Center
- League: Liga Nacional de Básquet

Personal information
- Born: 19 May 2000 (age 26) San Jorge, Santa Fe, Argentina
- Listed height: 7 ft 1 in (2.16 m)
- Listed weight: 242 lb (110 kg)

Career information
- High school: NBA Global Academy
- College: Virginia (2019–2023); Santa Clara (2023–2024)
- NBA draft: 2024: undrafted
- Playing career: 2024–present

Career history
- 2024: Estudiantes
- 2024–2025: Bàsquet Girona
- 2025–present: Boca Juniors
Medals
Men's basketball
Representing Argentina
FIBA AmeriCup
Silver medal – second place	2025 Managua
FIBA Americas Under-18 Championship
Bronze medal – third place	2018 Canada

Francisco Cáffaro (born 19 May 2000) is an Argentine basketball player who last played for Boca Juniors of the Liga Nacional de Básquetbol. He played college basketball for the Virginia Cavaliers and Santa Clara Broncos.

Cáffaro represented the senior Argentina men's national basketball team at the 2020 Summer Olympics.

== Early life ==
Cáffaro was born in San Jorge, Argentina, and grew up in Santa Fe, Argentina. From 2016 to 2018, he attended the NBA Global Academy in Canberra, Australia and was one of the first graduates of the school to sign with an NCAA university.

=== Recruiting ===
College recruiting
Name	Hometown	School	Height	Weight	Commit date
Francisco Cáffaro; C	Santa Fe, Argentina	—	7 ft 0 in (2.13 m)	215 lb (98 kg)	May 1, 2018
Francisco Cáffaro; C	Recruit ratings: Rivals: 247Sports: (NR)				
Overall recruit ranking: 247Sports: 148
Note: In many cases, Scout, Rivals, 247Sports, On3, and ESPN may conflict in their listings of height and weight.; In these cases, the average was taken. ESPN grades are on a 100-point scale.; Sources: "Virginia 2018 Basketball Commitments". Rivals.; "2018 Virginia Cavaliers Recruiting Class". ESPN.; "2018 Team Ranking". Rivals.

== College career ==
Cáffaro spent Virginia's 2019 NCAA championship season on the bench while redshirting. As a redshirt freshman, he saw action in 20 games, averaging 1.4 points and 1.2 rebounds. He posted a career-high, 10 points and seven rebounds against UNC. As a redshirt sophomore, Cáffaro saw limited action in only 17 games, and posted collegiate career lows in games, minutes, and points due to the deep depth of the team.

== International career ==
Cáffaro won the bronze medal at the 2018 FIBA Under-18 Americas Championship when he was named to the all-tournament team. He represented the senior Argentina national basketball team at the 2020 Summer Olympics men's tournament.

== Career statistics ==
Legend
GP	Games played	GS	Games started	MPG	Minutes per game
FG%	Field goal percentage	3P%	3-point field goal percentage	FT%	Free throw percentage
RPG	Rebounds per game	APG	Assists per game	SPG	Steals per game
BPG	Blocks per game	PPG	Points per game	**Bold**	Career high

=== College ===
Year	Team	GP	GS	MPG	FG%	3P%	FT%	RPG	APG	SPG	BPG	PPG
2018–19	Virginia	Redshirt										
2019–20	Virginia	**20**	**2**	**7.5**	**.529**	–	.667	**1.2**	.0	**.1**	**.3**	**1.4**
2020–21	Virginia	17	0	6.9	.500	–	**.800**	**1.2**	**.1**	.0	.1	1.2
Career		37	2	7.2	.517	–	.720	1.2	.1	.1	.2	1.3
