= Patricio Prato =

Argentine basketball player

Patricio Prato (born November 24, 1979, in Buenos Aires) is a 194 cm tall Argentine basketballer. His father, Fernando, was a player as well. Currently, he plays for NGC Cantu. He played his college ball in the United States for St. Bonaventure University.

== Clubs ==
- Atenas de Córdoba
- Skipper Bologna
- S.S. Felice Scandone
- Solsonica Rieti

College

- St. Bonaventure University

== Titles ==
With the Argentina national basketball team

- 1996 South American Under-18 Championship
- 2003 South American Championship - 2nd place
- 2007 Pan American Games - 4th place

He also played for the Cordoba select teams: cadets in 1995 and mayor in 2000, 2001 and 2002.
