= Torneo Interligas de Básquet =

- Founded: 2010
- First season: 2009–10
- Folded: 2012
- Country: Argentina; Brazil
- Related competitions: Liga Nacional de Básquet; Novo Basquete Brasil
- Last champions: Peñarol (2nd title)
- Most championships: Peñarol (2 titles)

The Torneo Interligas de Básquet (Portuguese: Torneio Interligas Brasil-Argentina) (English: InterLeagues Basketball Tournament) was an international professional club basketball competition between the four best-placed teams in the top-tier level Argentine and Brazilian leagues.

== History ==
The presidents of the Asociación de Clubes de Basquetbol of Argentina and of the Brazilian Liga Nacional de Basquete do Brasil met on March 12, 2010, in São Paulo, Brazil, to discuss the creation of a tournament between the top clubs from both countries. The tournament was held from 2010 to 2012.

== Format ==
In the first stage, the eight teams were divided in two groups of four teams each. Each group had two teams from Argentina, and two teams from Brazil. One group was played in Argentina, while the other group was played in Brazil. The teams played against the other teams of their respective groups once. The winner of each group placed in the final. The finals were played in Argentina, if there was at least one Argentine team. If there were two Brazilian teams, the final was played in Brazil.

== Participating teams ==
=== 2010 Torneo InterLigas ===
Group A	Group B	Final
Brasília (Brazil)	Mar del Plata (Argentina)	Mar del Plata (Argentina)
(Brazil) Brasília	(Argentina) Peñarol Mar del Plata	(Argentina) Peñarol Mar del Plata 90–78 (Brazil) Brasília
(Brazil) Flamengo	(Argentina) Atenas de Córdoba	April 15
(Argentina) Sionista	(Brazil) Minas TC
(Argentina) Libertad Sunchales	(Brazil) Franca

=== 2011 Torneo InterLigas ===
Group A	Group B	Final
Mendoza (Argentina)	Franca (Brazil)	São Paulo (Brazil)
(Argentina) Obras Sanitarias	(Brazil) Franca	(Brazil) Pinheiros 77–80 (Argentina) Obras Sanitarias
(Argentina) Peñarol Mar del Plata	(Brazil) Pinheiros	April 21
(Brazil) Brasília	(Argentina) Libertad Sunchales
(Brazil) Flamengo	(Argentina) Atenas de Córdoba

=== 2012 Torneo InterLigas ===
Group A	Group B	Final
Uberlândia (Brazil)	Buenos Aires (Argentina)	Mar del Plata (Argentina)
(Brazil) Pinheiros	(Argentina) Peñarol Mar del Plata	(Argentina) Peñarol Mar del Plata 88–75 (Brazil) Pinheiros
(Brazil) Unitri Uberlândia	(Argentina) Obras Sanitarias
(Argentina) Lanús	(Brazil) Bauru
(Argentina) Libertad Sunchales	(Brazil) Paulistano

== List of champions ==
Year	Venue	Champion	Result	Runner-up
2010	Mar del Plata, Argentina	Peñarol	90–78	Brasília
2011	São Paulo, Brazil	Obras Sanitarias	80–77	Pinheiros
2012	Mar del Plata, Argentina	Peñarol	88–75	Pinheiros

== Performances ==
=== By club ===
Team	Winners	Years Won
(Argentina) Peñarol	2	2010, 2012
(Argentina) Obras Sanitarias	1	2011

=== By country ===
Nation	Winners
Argentina	3
Brazil	0

== MVPs ==
- 2010: (Argentina) Leonardo Gutiérrez (Peñarol Mar del Plata)
- 2011: (United States) William McFarlan (Obras Sanitarias)
- 2012: (Argentina) Leonardo Gutiérrez (Peñarol Mar del Plata)

== See also ==
- Liga Nacional de Básquet
- Torneo Súper 8
- Torneo Top 4
- Copa Argentina
- Novo Basquete Brasil
