= Regatas Corrientes =

- Nickname: Remero
- Leagues: Liga Nacional de Básquet
- Founded: 27 September 1923; 102 years ago
- Arena: José Conte
- Capacity: 2,600
- Location: Corrientes, Argentina
- Team colors
- President: Emilio Lanari
- Head coach: Fabio Demti
- Championships: 2 Liga Sudamericana; 1 FIBA Americas League; 1 LNB; 1 Copa Argentina
- Website: crc.org.ar
Home	Away

Club de Regatas Corrientes, usually just Regatas Corrientes, is a sports club of Corrientes, Argentina, located on the river side of the Paraná River. Although Regatas was born as a rowing institution, the club is mostly recognized due to its basketball team, which plays in the Liga Nacional de Básquet (Argentine first division). Its home stadium is the Estadio José Jorge Conte, that holds 5,000 people.

Apart from basketball, the club hosts a large variety of sports such as rowing, association football, cestoball, chess, gymnastics, judo, karate, swimming, table tennis, taekwondo, volleyball and weight lifting.

== History ==
The club was founded on September 27, 1923, by a group of enthusiastic rowers and swimmers. The first president was Dr. José Chapo. At the beginning, the Regatas had few members and a large beach over the Río Paraná coast. The institution was expanding itself developing activities such as rowing, swimming and sailing ship.

Some of the most relevants sailors of that time were Antonio Leconte, the Miholvisevich Brothers, Fages and Ismael Condado, all of them representing Regatas in diverse competitions. Other clubs that also participated were Club de Regatas de Resistencia (Chaco), Club Náutico de Formosa (Formosa), Náutico de Monte Caseros (Corrientes), Náutico de Eldorado (Misiones), Rowing Club de Posadas and the Paraguayan clubs Deportivo de Puerto Sajonia and Mbigua.

During the 70's, Regatas incorporated a lot of new members, who came attracted by its beach where they could spend long periods of time during Summertime. The club received also funds from the Government used to build a roofed stadium, Estadio José Jorge Conte, which was able for the practice of basketball and volleyball and had a capacity of 2,600 seats.

In 2008, Regatas won the Liga Sudamericana defeating Flamengo 3–2 (in matches won) in the final.

== Players ==
=== Current roster ===
Note: Flags indicate national team eligibility at FIBA-sanctioned events. Players may hold other non-FIBA nationalities not displayed.

Regatas Corrientes roster
Players
Coaches

Pos.	No.	Nat.	Name	Ht.	Age
G/F	0	(Argentina)	Bender, Viktor	1.97 m (6 ft 6 in)	18 – 21 October 2006
PG	1	(Argentina)	Corbalán, Juan	1.85 m (6 ft 1 in)	27 – 27 August 1998
G	2	(Argentina)	Chiarini, Mateo	1.89 m (6 ft 2 in)	27 – 4 September 1998
SG	5	(Argentina)	Gramajo, Pablo	1.93 m (6 ft 4 in)	29 – 2 February 1996
G	7	(Argentina)	Aguirre, Gustavo	1.88 m (6 ft 2 in)	37 – 31 March 1988
PG	10	(Argentina)	Jaime, Andres	1.85 m (6 ft 1 in)	25 – 13 March 2000
F	11	(Argentina)	Ferraro, Francisco	1.96 m (6 ft 5 in)	21 – 9 February 2004
C	15	(Argentina)	Ortega, Ignacio	2.05 m (6 ft 9 in)	21 – 15 March 2004
SF	16	(Argentina)	Lugo, Sebastián	1.98 m (6 ft 6 in)	27 – 26 March 1998
PF	21	(Argentina)	Larraza, Juan	2.00 m (6 ft 7 in)	21 – 26 December 2003
F	33	(Argentina)	Ramirez, Fabián	1.95 m (6 ft 5 in)	35 – 23 February 1990
C	42	(Dominican Republic)	Santos, Luis	2.03 m (6 ft 8 in)	30 – 6 December 1994

Head coach

- (Argentina) Nicolas Casalanguida

Assistant coach(es)

- (Argentina) Eduardo Pfleger

Legend

- (C) Team captain
- Injured

- Roster
Updated: 2020-01-01

=== Retired numbers ===
Regatas Corrientes retired numbers
N°	Player	Pos.	Tenure	No. ret.	Ref.
13	(Argentina) Paolo Quinteros	SG	2011–22	2022	

=== Notable players ===
Note: Flags indicate national team eligibility at FIBA-sanctioned events. Players may hold other non-FIBA nationalities not displayed.

Criteria

To appear in this section a player must have either:

- Set a club record or won an individual award while at the club
- Played at least one official international match for their national team at any time
- Played at least one official NBA match at any time.

- (Argentina) Nicolas Brussino (2012–2015)
- (Iceland) Ægir Steinarsson (2019)

== Honours ==
=== National ===
- Liga Nacional de Básquet (1):: 2012–13
- Copa Argentina de Básquet (1):: 2007

=== International ===
- Liga Sudamericana (2):: 2008, 2012
- FIBA Americas League (1):: 2010–11
