= Torneo Top 4 de Básquet =

Argentinian professional basketball cup competition

Torneo Top 4
- Founded: 2002
- First season: 2001–02
- Folded: 2004
- Country: Argentina
- Number of teams: 4
- Related competitions: Liga Nacional de Básquet
- Last champions: Boca Juniors (1st title)
- Most championships: Estudiantes de Olavarría; Libertad de Sunchales; Atenas; Boca Juniors (1 title)
- Website: laliganacional.com.ar

The Torneo Top 4 de Básquet (English: Top 4 Basketball Tournament) was a national domestic professional basketball cup tournament that was contested between clubs from Argentina's top-tier level Liga Nacional de Básquet (LNB). A similar system was planned for 2015-16.

== Format ==
The Torneo Top 4 was contested between the top four placed clubs in the regular season league standings of the Argentine top-tier level league, the Liga Nacional de Básquet (LNB). The tournament took place after the first half of the league's regular season was completed. The top four placed teams at the half-way point of the LNB's regular season contested the cup tournament.

== History ==
The Torneo Top 4 was originally contested between 2002 and 2004. In 2005 it was replaced by the Torneo Súper 8 (Super 8 Tournament).

== Winners ==
| Year (Season) | Venue | Winners | Runners-up |
|---|---|---|---|
| 2002 I 2001–02 | Estadio Ángel Malvicino (Santa Fe) | Estudiantes de Olavarría | Atenas |
| 2002 II; 2002–03 | Estadio Ángel Malvicino (Santa Fe) | Libertad de Sunchales | Boca Juniors |
| 2003; 2003–04 | Estadio Coliseo del Sur (Rafaela) | Atenas | Boca Juniors |
| 2004; 2004–05 | Estadio Universidad Tecnológica, Santa Fe (Santa Fe) | Boca Juniors | Club Sportivo Ben Hur |

== See also ==
- LNB
- Torneo Súper 8
- Copa Argentina
- Torneo InterLigas
