= Copa Argentina de Básquet =

- Founded: 2002
- Folded: 2010; 16 years ago
- Country: Argentina
- Related competitions: LNB; TNA; Súper 8 Top 4
- Last champions: Peñarol (1st title)
- Most championships: Boca Juniors (5 titles)

The Copa Argentina de Básquet (English: Argentina Cup of Basketball) was an Argentine men's professional club basketball national cup competition. The competition was contested between the teams of the top-tier level –Liga Nacional de Básquet (LNB), and the second-tier level –Torneo Nacional de Ascenso.

In 2011, the Pre-Olympic Tournament (2011 FIBA Americas Championship) that was held from August 30 to September 11 in the city of Mar del Plata, prevented the 2011 Argentine Cup from being played, for this reason, the cup was canceled for that year. The competition was never resumed.

Nine editions of the cup were played, with Boca Juniors being the most winning team with 5 titles.

== Champions ==
#	Year	Champion	Runner-up	Final		Tournament MVP	Ref.
#	Year	Champion	Runner-up	Venue	City	Tournament MVP	Ref.
1	2002	Boca Juniors (1)	Atenas	Estadio Once Unidos	Mar del Plata		
2	2003	Boca Juniors (2)	Atenas	Polideportivo Carlos Cerutti	Córdoba		
3	2004	Boca Juniors (3)	River Plate	Estadio Luis Conde	Buenos Aires		
4	2005	Boca Juniors (4)	River Plate	Estadio Héctor Etchart	Buenos Aires		
5	2006	Boca Juniors (5)	Peñarol	Estadio Cubierto Newell's	Rosario		
6	2007	Regatas (C) (1)	Peñarol	Polideportivo Municipal	Monte Hermoso	Javier Martínez	
7	2008	Atenas (1)	Peñarol	Estadio Osvaldo Casanova	Bahía Blanca	Juan M. Locatelli	
8	2009	Quimsa (1)	Gimnasia y Esgrima (CR)	Gimnasio Municipal 1	Trelew		
9	2010	Peñarol (1)	La Unión	Estadio Ciudad	Santiago del Estero	Facundo Campazzo	

== See also ==
- LNB
- Torneo Súper 8
- Torneo Top 4
- Torneo InterLigas
