= Club Atlético Peñarol (Mar del Plata) =

Argentine sports club

Peñarol (MDP)
- Nickname: Milrayitas (thousand-strips)
- Leagues: LNB
- Founded: 7 November 1922; 103 years ago
- Arena: Polideportivo Islas Malvinas
- Location: Mar del Plata, Buenos Aires Province, Argentina
- Team colors
- President: Domingo Robles
- Head coach: Leonardo Gutiérrez
- Championships: 5 Argentine championships 2 FIBA Americas League; 2 Torneo InterLigas; 3 Torneo Super 8; 2 Copa Desafío; 1 Copa Argentina
- Website: penarolmdp.com.ar
Home	Away

Club Atlético Peñarol (usually called Peñarol de Mar del Plata or simply Peñarol) is an Argentine sports club based in Mar del Plata. The club is mostly known for its basketball team, which is currently playing in the Liga Nacional de Básquet (LNB), the top level of the Argentine league system. Their home arena is the Polideportivo Islas Malvinas.

The team had its most successful campaign during 2010, winning 5 official tournaments (FIBA Americas League, Liga Nacional, InterLigas, and Copa Argentina).

Apart from basketball, other activities held in Peñarol are football and martial arts.

== Players ==
=== Current roster ===
Note: Flags indicate national team eligibility at FIBA-sanctioned events. Players may hold other non-FIBA nationalities not displayed.

Peñarol Mar del Plata roster
Players
Coaches

Pos.	No.	Nat.	Name	Ht.	Age
G	2	(Argentina)	Tolosa, Facundo	1.90 m (6 ft 3 in)	24 – 12 April 2002
F/C	3	(Argentina)	Basualdo, Iván	2.03 m (6 ft 8 in)	36 – 16 January 1990
PG	4	(Argentina)	Guerra, Luciano	1.84 m (6 ft 0 in)	29 – 2 September 1997
PG	9	(Argentina)	Vazquez, Facundo	1.85 m (6 ft 1 in)	28 – 23 April 1998
F	11	(Argentina)	Chapero, Martín	2.00 m (6 ft 7 in)	18 – 24 November 2007
F	15	(Argentina)	Chiaraviglio, Nicolás	1.99 m (6 ft 6 in)	22 – 1 April 2004
G	18	(Argentina)	Perez, Agustín	1.87 m (6 ft 2 in)	27 – 25 May 1999
F	19	(Argentina)	Aman, Gonzalo	1.90 m (6 ft 3 in)	18 – 21 April 2008
PG	33	(Argentina) (Italy)	Rossi, Gianluca	1.70 m (5 ft 7 in)	21 – 7 January 2005
C	35	(Argentina)	Acuña, Roberto	2.08 m (6 ft 10 in)	36 – 14 September 1990
SF	73	(Dominican Republic) (Argentina)	Carreras, Xavier		32 – 9 October 1994

Head coach

- (Argentina) Adrian Capelli

Assistant coach(es)

- (Argentina) Mariano Rodriguez
- (Argentina) Hernan Ferrero

Legend

- (C) Team captain
- Injured

- Roster
Updated: 2024-05-26

=== Retired numbers ===
Peñarol's retired numbers
N°	Nat.	Player	Pos.	Tenure	Num. Retirement
8	(Argentina)	Tato Rodríguez	PG	1994–1998, 1999–2003, 2004–2011	23 Nov 2011

=== Notable players ===
Note: Flags indicate national team eligibility at FIBA-sanctioned events. Players may hold other non-FIBA nationalities not displayed.

Criteria

To appear in this section a player must have either:

- Set a club record or won an individual award while at the club
- Played at least one official international match for their national team at any time
- Played at least one official NBA match at any time.

- (Argentina) Sergio Aispurúa (1989–91, 2002–03)
- (Argentina) Ariel Bernardini (1993–99)
- (United States) Billy Thompson (1997–98)
- (United States) Rodney Blake (2000–01)
- (Argentina) Facundo Campazzo (2008–14)
- (Argentina) Andrés Nocioni (2011)
- (Argentina) Nicolás Brussino (2015–16)
- (United States) Al Thornton (2021–present)

== Head coaches ==
- (Argentina) Sergio Hernández

== Titles ==
=== National ===
- Liga Nacional (5): 1993–94, 2009–10, 2010–11, 2011–12, 2013–14
- Copa Argentina (1): 2010
- Torneo Súper 8 (4): 2006, 2009, 2011, 2013
- Copa Desafío (2): 2007, 2010

=== International ===
- FIBA Americas League (2): 2007–08, 2009–10
- Torneo InterLigas (2): 2010, 2012
- Campeonato Panamericano Runner-up (1): 1995

== Individual accomplishments ==
=== Olympic team selection ===
- (Argentina) Leonardo Gutiérrez – 2004, 2008
- (Argentina) Sergio Hernández (coach) – 2008
