= Asociación Deportiva Atenas =

Argentine sports club

Atenas
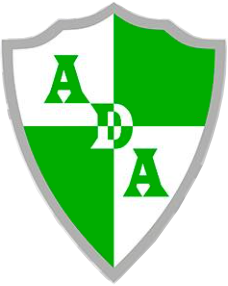
- Nickname: Griego
- Leagues: LAB
- Founded: 17 April 1938; 88 years ago
- Arena: Polideportivo Carlos Cerutti
- Location: Córdoba, Argentina
- Team colors: Green, White
- President: Felipe Lábaque
- Head coach: Alejandro Lotterio
- Championships: List: 9 LNB; 3 Liga Sudamericana; 2 Sudamericano de Clubes; 2 Copa de Campeones; 1 Campeonato Panamericano; 1 Super 8; 1Top 4; 1 Copa Argentina
- Website: atenas.com.ar
Home	Away

Asociación Deportiva Atenas, mostly known as Atenas de Córdoba, is a sports club based in Córdoba, Argentina. It was founded in 1938, and is mostly known for its achievements in basketball. The club is the most successful team in Argentina holding 20 titles. The club's home arena is Polideportivo Carlos Cerutti. Until 2020, Atenas hosted some high attendance games at the Orfeo Superdomo.

Apart from basketball, other sports practised at Atenas are rhythmic gymnastics and volleyball.

== History ==
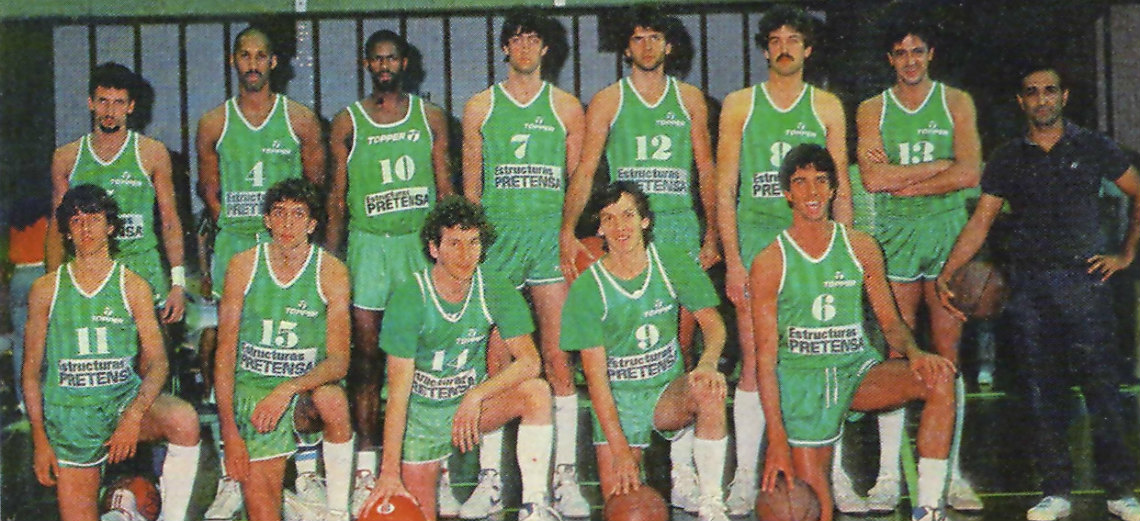
The 1987 roster that won the first title for the club

The club was founded on March 7, 1938, mainly by former members of the New Tennis Club.

Before the creation of the Liga Nacional de Básquet (first Argentine nationwide professional league), Atenas was successful at the Cordobese basketball league, winning the championship consecutively between 1948 and 1957 (exception made of 1953).

Since the creation of the Liga Nacional in 1984, Atenas has become the most successful team in the league, winning the championship 9 times: 1987, 1988, 1990, 1991–92, 1997–98, 1998–99, 2001–02, 2002–03 and 2008–09. Moreover, the Córdoba outfit has won the Liga Sudamericana (South American League) in 1997, 1998 and 2004, and the former Campeonato Sudamericano de Clubes (South American Clubs Championship) in 1993, 1994, and 1996.

Many Argentine internationals have played in Atenas, namely Fabricio Oberto, Walter Herrmann, Marcelo Milanesio, Héctor Campana, Patricio Prato, Gabriel Mikulas, Diego Lo Grippo, Fernando Prato, Bruno Lábaque, Leonardo Gutiérrez, Juan Manuel Locatelli, Diego Osella, Carlos Cerutti and Juan Espil, among others.

In May 2023, Atenas was relegated to La Liga Argentina, the second division of Argentine basketball, for the first time in their history. Atenas lost to San Lorenzo 73–61 in the 5th. game of promotion/relegation playoffs.

== Players ==
=== Current roster (2025-26) ===
Atenas roster
Players
Coaches

Pos.	No.	Nat.	Name	Ht.	Age
F	1	(United States)	Sanders, Nakye	2.03 m (6 ft 8 in)	28 – 1 November 1997
F	2	(United States)	Loving, Marc	2.03 m (6 ft 8 in)	31 – 16 September 1994
G	3	(Argentina)	Ferreyra, Santiago	1.88 m (6 ft 2 in)	29 – 11 March 1997
PG	4	(Argentina)	Buendia, Manuel Carlos	1.77 m (5 ft 10 in)	31 – 13 March 1995
PG	8	(Argentina)	Zurschmitten, Nicolàs	1.83 m (6 ft 0 in)	30 – 2 August 1995
G	10	(Dominican Republic)	Montero, José	1.93 m (6 ft 4 in)	31 – 2 January 1995
SF	13	(Argentina) (Chile)	Bustamante, Lucas Arn	1.97 m (6 ft 6 in)	37 – 24 April 1989
PG	18	(Argentina)	Imaz, Benjamín	1.80 m (5 ft 11 in)	22 – 26 June 2004
G/F	15	(Argentina)	Ledesma, Ramiro	1.92 m (6 ft 4 in)	25 – 30 August 2000
G/F	21	(Argentina) (Brazil)	Misetich, Germán	1.93 m (6 ft 4 in)	21 – 3 March 2005
F	55	(Argentina)	Oberto, Juan Cruz	2.00 m (6 ft 7 in)	29 – 25 January 1997
G	77	(Argentina)	Tomatis, Tiago	1.94 m (6 ft 4 in)	19 – 25 October 2006

Head coach

- (Argentina) Gustavo Peirone

Legend

- (C) Team captain
- Injured

- Roster
Updated: 16 Apr 2024

=== Retired numbers ===
Atenas has retired a total of four numbers, being Marcelo Milanesio's n° 9 the first number to be retired in the history of LNB, when the club put it out of circulation in 2002.

Atenas retired numbers
N°	Nat.	Player	Pos.	Seasons with the team	No. ret.	Ref.
5	(Argentina)	Héctor Campana	SG	1987–88, 1991–92, 1996–2000, 2002–04	2005	
7	(Argentina)	Bruno Lábaque	PG	1994–2003, 2006–09, 2010–17	2017	
9	(Argentina)	Marcelo Milanesio	PG	1982–2002	2002	
11	(Argentina)	Diego Osella	C	1988–1992, 1993–2001, 2003–2010	2011	

== Titles ==
=== National ===
- Liga Nacional (9): 1987, 1988, 1990, 1991–92, 1997–98, 1998–99, 2001–02, 2002–03, 2008–09
- Copa de Campeones (2): 1998, 1999
- Super 8 (1): 2010–11
- Top 4 (1): 2003–04
- Copa Argentina (1): 2008

=== International ===
- Liga Sudamericana (3): 1997, 1998, 2004
- Campeonato Sudamericano (2): 1993, 1994
- Campeonato Panamericano (1): 1996

== Records and facts ==
- Largest win: 140–81 to Independiente de Tucumán (1985-08-29)
- Worst defeat: 49–83 to Gimnasia y Esgrima LP (2004-01-06)
- The Argentine team with most national (14) and international (6) titles
- All-time topscorer: Marcelo Milanesio (10,835)
- Most games played: Marcelo Milanesio (848)
