= Obras Sanitarias =

- Nickname: Tachero, Aurinegro
- Leagues: LNB
- Founded: 27 March 1917; 109 years ago
- History: 1926 – Present (basketball section)
- Arena: Estadio Obras Sanitarias
- Capacity: 3,100
- Location: Núñez, Buenos Aires, Argentina
- Team colors
- President: Fabián Borro
- Head coach: Diego Vadell
- Championships: 1 Intercontinental Cup; 1 South American League; 1' InterLeagues Tournament; 3 Argentine Club Championships; 1 National Ascention Tournament
- Website: obrasbasket.com
Home	Away

Club Atlético Obras Sanitarias de la Nación (mostly known simply as Obras Sanitarias or Obras) is an Argentine professional sports club that is located in the district of Núñez, Buenos Aires. Although originally conceived as a rugby union club, Obras Sanitarias is mostly known for its basketball team, which currently plays in the Liga Nacional de Básquet, which is the first division of the Argentine basketball league system. Apart from basketball and rugby union, other disciplines practiced at the club are chess, judo, swimming, table tennis, and tennis.

Obras Sanitarias has been nicknamed Los Tacheros, a lunfardo word used to refer to Argentine taxi drivers, because taxi cabs are painted in black and yellow, which are the same colors of Obras' jersey uniforms.

== History ==
Obras Sanitarias was founded in 1917, by employees of the state-owned water supply company, "Obras Sanitarias de la Nación". On March 22, 1925, the club opened its sports facilities, allowing members to practice athletics, basque pelota, bowls, football, rugby union, swimming and tennis there. In 1941, Obras inaugurated its headquarters in the city of Buenos Aires, for the practice of indoor sports.

In 1978, Obras inaugurated its indoor arena, named Estadio Obras Sanitarias, and two years later, the first synthetic field hockey pitch in South America.

== Basketball ==
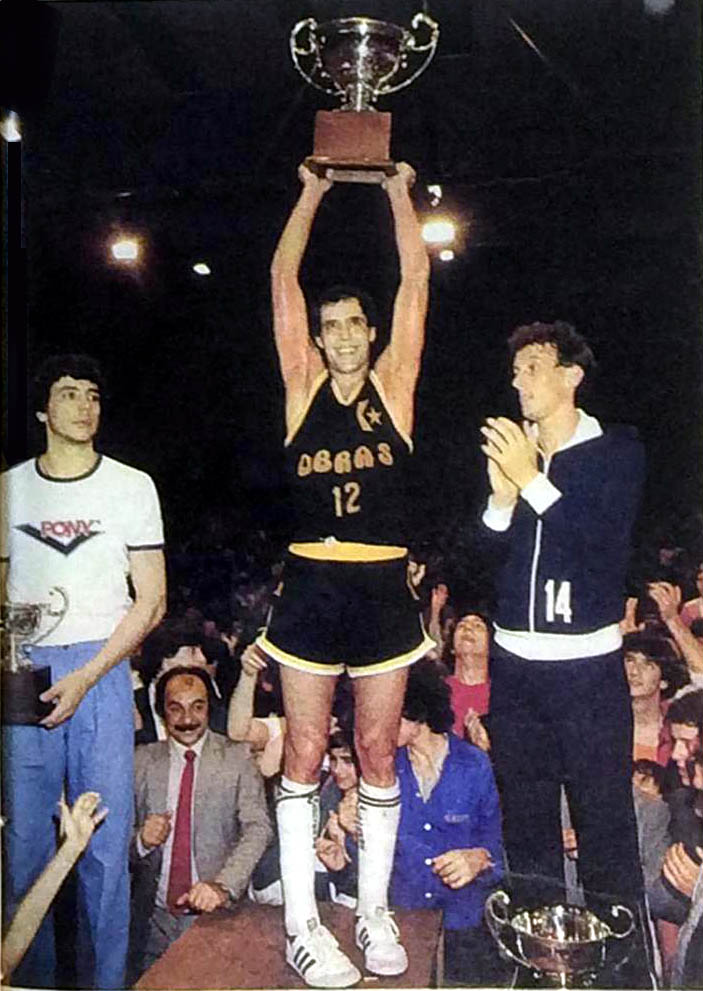
Eduardo Cadillac raising the 1983 FIBA Intercontinental Cup, which was won by Obras Sanitarias.

Obras Sanitarias, along with the Brazilian clubs Sírio and Flamengo, and the Venezuelan club Guaros de Lara is one of only four South American basketball clubs that have won the FIBA Intercontinental Cup title. Obras did so in the 1983 FIBA Intercontinental Cup, by defeating the Italian League club Jollycolombani Cantù. In February 2012, Obras won the South American League championship for the first time, after winning the 2011 edition of the tournament, after beating the Brazilian club Pinheiros, by a score of 88–73 in the final.

=== Current roster ===
Note: Flags indicate national team eligibility at FIBA-sanctioned events. Players may hold other non-FIBA nationalities not displayed.

Obras Sanitarias roster
Players
Coaches

Pos.	No.	Nat.	Name	Ht.	Age
F	1	(United States)	Corum, Andrew	2.00 m (6 ft 7 in)	29 – 1 September 1997
G	2	(Chile)	Inyaco, Felipe	1.92 m (6 ft 4 in)	24 – 2 May 2002
PG	3	(Argentina)	Barral, Pedro	1.87 m (6 ft 2 in)	31 – 20 October 1994
PG	5	(Argentina)	Brussino, Juan	1.85 m (6 ft 1 in)	35 – 14 March 1991
F	8	(Argentina)	Zezular, Federico	1.97 m (6 ft 6 in)	24 – 9 November 2001
F	6	(Argentina)	Mata, Marcos	2.01 m (6 ft 7 in)	40 – 1 August 1986
PF	9	(Spain)	Bilbao, Jorge	2.03 m (6 ft 8 in)	31 – 27 June 1995
C	12	(Argentina) (Italy)	Delía, Marcos	2.08 m (6 ft 10 in)	34 – 8 April 1992
G	22	(United States)	Sabin, Ty	1.90 m (6 ft 3 in)	31 – 15 October 1994
PF/C	26	(Argentina)	Lopez, Joaquín	2.05 m (6 ft 9 in)	21 – 26 May 2005
PF/C	44	(Argentina)	Lopez, Valentino Finetti	2.05 m (6 ft 9 in)	21 – 5 August 2005
G	88	(Argentina)	Respaud, Juan	1.90 m (6 ft 3 in)	21 – 7 July 2005

Head coach

- (Argentina) Gregorio Martinez

Assistant coach(es)

- (Argentina) Iván Najnudel

Legend

- (C) Team captain
- Injured

- Roster
Updated: 2020-01-01

=== Notable players ===
Note: Flags indicate national team eligibility at FIBA-sanctioned events. Players may hold other non-FIBA nationalities not displayed.

Criteria

To appear in this section a player must have either:

- Set a club record or won an individual award while at the club
- Played at least one official international match for their national team at any time
- Played at least one official NBA match at any time.

- (Argentina) / (Italy) Pablo Prigioni
- (Cuba) Lazaro Borrell
- (Finland) Samuel Haanpää
- (Panama) Rolando Frazer
- (Panama) Mario Butler
- (United States) Norton Barnhill
- (United States) Maurice Kemp
- (United States) Charles Smith

== Rugby union ==
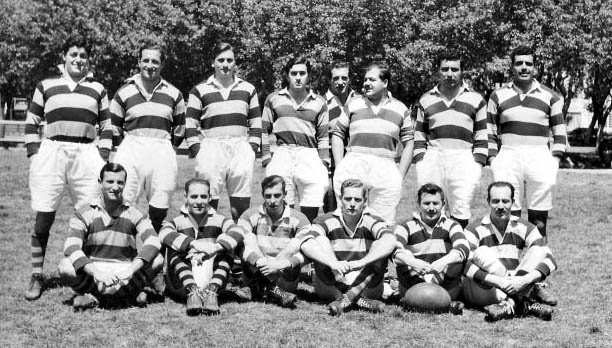
The rugby squad that won the 1953 championship

The club's rugby installations are located in La Matanza Partido, of Greater Buenos Aires. The club was affiliated to the Unión de Rugby de Buenos Aires in 1917, soon after its establishment.

In 1953, Obras won the RPRU championship, which is its only title to date. For that tournament, Obras formed a squad that was a mixture of experienced players, along with young talents that had won the reserves championship two years before, with 8 players being promoted to the senior team. During the tournament, Obras Sanitarias only lost one match (versus Hindú by a score of 11–3). In the penultimate round of the tournament, when Obras beat Pucará, by a score of 5–0, with a try conversion by Alberto Dramis.

With Olivos keeping the club's chances to get the title alive, Obras achieved another win versus Deportiva Francesa, in the last fixture, winning the championship with no sharing of the title. The top scorer was Alberto Bublath, with 27 points.

Obras Sanitarias currently plays in Desarrollo, the 7th. division of the URBA league system. The club also has a women's rugby team, which competes in the "Torneo Femenino", which is organized by the same governing body.

== Titles ==
=== Basketball ===
- Campeonato Argentino de Clubes (3): 1975, 1976, 1982
- FIBA Intercontinental Cup (1): 1983
- Liga Sudamericana (1): 2011
- Torneo InterLigas (1): 2011
- Torneo Nacional de Ascenso (1): 1996

=== Rugby union ===
- Torneo de la URBA (1): 1953
