= Liga Nacional de Básquet Statistical Leaders =

The Liga Nacional de Básquet Statistical Leaders are the statistical leaders in various different categories of Argentina's top-tier level men's professional club basketball league, the Liga Nacional de Básquet (LNB), or "La Liga".

== Top Scorers by season ==
- Player nationality by national team:

Season	Nat.	Player	Club	Pts.	Avg.	G
1985	(Uruguay)	Wilfredo Ruiz (1)	Estudiantes (BB)	1,117	32.9	34
1986	(Uruguay)	Wilfredo Ruiz (2)	Estudiantes (BB)	1,008	31.5	32
1987	(Uruguay)	Wilfredo Ruiz (3)	Estudiantes (BB)	913	30.4	30
1988	(Argentina)	Luis GonzáleZ	Atlético Echagüe	896	28.9	31
1989	(Argentina)	Héctor Campana (1)	River Plate	1,041	29.7	35
1990	(Argentina)	Héctor Campana (2)	River Plate	1,148	44.2	26
1990–91	(Argentina)	Héctor Campana (2)	GEPU	1,448	31.5	46
1991–92	(Argentina)	Héctor Campana (4)	Atenas	1,360	27.8	49
1992–93	(Argentina)	Juan Espil (1)	GEPU	1,672	28.8	58
1993–94	(United States)	Andrew Moten [es]	Gimnasia y Esgrima (CR)	896	29.9	30
1994–95	(Argentina)	Juan Espil (2)	Atenas	1,470	28.8	51
1995–96	(Argentina)	Juan Espil (3)	Atenas	1,782	31.3	57
1996–97	(United States)	Charlie Burke	Pico F.C. [es]	1,088	29.4	37
1997–98	(United States)	Corey Allen	Pico F.C.	1,415	28.9	49
1998–99	(United States)	J. J. Eubanks (1)	Estudiantes (O)	1,060	25.9	41
1999–00	(United States)	J. J. Eubanks (2)	Estudiantes (O)	1,514	27.5	55
2000–01	(United States)	Joe Bunn (1)	Peñarol (MdP)	1,208	25.2	48
2001–02	(United States)	Joe Bunn (2)	Atenas	625	26.0	24
2002–03	(United States)	Josh Pittman	Quilmes (MdP)	626	26.1	24
2003–04	(United States)	Joe Bunn (3)	Peñarol (MdP)	1,209	32.7	37
2004–05	(Argentina)	Paolo Quinteros	Boca Juniors	1,232	22.4	55
2005–06	(United States)	Joe Bunn (4)	Estudiantes (BB)	739	28.6	48
2006–07	(Colombia)	Stalin Ortiz	Quilmes (MdP)	981	20.4	32
2007–08	(Argentina)	Leo Gutiérrez	Boca Juniors	993	23.1	48
2008–09	(United States)	Ed Nelson	Estudiantes (BB)	946	20.1	47
2009–10	(United States)	David Jackson	La Unión	927	18.9	49
2010–11	(United States)	Joe Bunn (5)	Argentino de Junín	882	19.6	45
2011–12	(United States)	Joe Troy Smith	La Unión	745	17.3	43
2012–13	(United States)	Darren Phillip	Unión Progresista	823	18.3	45
2013–14	(United States)	Walter Baxley (es) (1)	Quilmes (MDP)	983	19.3	51
2014–15	(United States)	Walter Baxley (es) (2)	Quilmes (MDP)	1,290	20.5	63
2015–16	(United States)	Walter Baxley (es) (3)	Quilmes (MDP)	1,328	23.7	56
2016–17	(United States)	Dar Tucker	Estudiantes (C)	1,256	21.7	58
2017–18	(United States)	Maurice Kemp	Obras Sanitarias	910	20.7	44
2018–19	(Cuba)	Jasiel Rivero	Boca Juniors	707	19.1	37
2019–20	(Brazil)	Caio Pacheco (es)	Bahía Basket	408	19.4	21
2020–21	(United States)	Kelsey Barlow	Hispano Americano	707	19.1	37
2021–22	(United States)	Jordan Williams	Platense	447	20.3	22
2022–23	(United States)	Thomas Cooper (es)	La Unión (F)	742	17.7	42
2023–24	(United States)	Andre Spight (es)	Obras Sanitarias	770	18.4	42
2024–25	(United States)	Al Thornton	Peñarol (MdP)	669	18.0	37
2025–26	(United States)	Ty Sabin	Obras Sanitarias	701	17.5	40

=== Players with most top-scorer awards ===
Total points

Nat.	Player	Awards	Winning seasons
(United States)	Joe Bunn	5	2000–01, 2001–02, 2003–04, 2005–06, 2010–11
(Argentina)	Héctor Campana	4	1989, 1990, 1990–91, 1991–92
(Argentina)	Juan Espil	3	1992–93, 1994–95, 1995–96
(Uruguay)	Wilfredo Ruiz	3	1985, 1986, 1987
(United States)	Walter Baxley (es)	3	2013–14, 2014–15, 2015–16
(United States)	J. J. Eubanks	2	1998–99, 1999–00

== Top rebounders by season ==
Season	Player	Pos.	Team	Games played	Total rebounds	Rebounds per game
1988	(United States) Dennis Still	C	Atlético Echagüe	33	593	18.0
1989	(United States) Dennis Still (2×)	C	Atlético Echagüe	25	450	18.0
1990	(United States) Thomas Jordan	C	Atenas	37	445	12.0
1990–91	(United States) Donald Jones	C	Olimpia Venado Tuerto	47	484	10.3
1991–92	(United States) Carl Davis	C	Banco Córdoba	26	330	12.7
1992–93	(United States) Dennis Still (3×)	C	Santa Paula de Gálvez	46	680	14.8
1993–94	(United States) Dennis Still (4×)	C	Santa Paula de Gálvez	46	612	13.3
1994–95	(United States) Brian Shorter	PF	Andino	38	500	13.2
1995–96	(United States) John Devereaux	PF	Peñarol MdP	44	469	10.7
1996–97	(United States) Dennis Still (5×)	C	Obras Sanitarias	51	766	15.0
1997–98	(United States) Dennis Still (6×)	C	Regatas San Nicolás	42	593	14.1
1998–99	(United States) Mike Ravizze	PF	Regatas San Nicolás	25	296	11.8
1999–00	(United States) Shelly Clark	C	Obras Sanitarias	44	414	9.4
2000–01	(United States) Ryan Perryman	F/C	Regatas San Nicolás	47	474	10.1
2001–02	(United States) Jared Prickett	PF	Peñarol MdP	26	246	9.5
2002–03	(Argentina) Román González	C	Libertad	20	199	10.0
2003–04	(Nigeria) Chima Igwe	F/C	Estudiantes (O)	28	330	11.8
2004–05	(United States) Ryan Perryman (2×)	F/C	Conarpesa	55	476	8.7
2005–06	(Panama) Antonio García	C	Estudiantes (O)	47	707	15.8
2006–07	(United States) Tyler Field	C	Obras Sanitarias	44	388	8.8
2007–08	(United States) Robert Battle	F/C	Libertad	55	518	9.4
2008–09	(Argentina) Federico Kammerichs	F	Regatas (C)	49	524	10.7
2009–10	(Argentina) Federico Kammerichs (2×)	F	Regatas (C)	42	496	11.8
2010–11	(Argentina) J. P. Gutiérrez	F/C	Obras Sanitarias	48	482	10.0
2011–12	(Dominican Republic) Jack Michael Martínez	F/C	San Martín (C)	23	285	12.4
2012–13	(United States) Sam Clancy Jr.	F/C	Ciclista Olímpico	43	463	10.8
2013–14	(United States) Sam Clancy Jr. (2×)	F/C	Gimnasia y Esgrima (CR)	53	610	11.5
2014–15	(United States) Sam Clancy Jr. (3×)	F/C	Gimnasia y Esgrima (CR)	63	711	11.5
2015–16	(United States) Justin Williams	F/C	Ciclista Olímpico	62	693	11.2
2016–17	(United States) Justin Williams (2×)	F/C	Ciclista Olímpico	64	744	11.6
2017–18	(United States) Eric Dawson	PF	Comunicaciones	23	308	13.4
2018–19	(Dominican Republic) Eloy Vargas	C	Gimnasia y Esgrima (CR)	38	360	9.5

== Top assists by season ==
Season	Player	Club	Games played	Total assists	Assists per game
1988	(Argentina) Marcelo Richotti (1)	Club Atlético Pacífico	34	237	7.0
1989					
1990					
1990-91					
1991–92	(Argentina) Miguel Cortijo	Ferro Carril Oeste	42	212	5.0
1992–93	(Argentina) Marcelo Richotti (2)	Peñarol de Mar del Plata	51	329	6.5
1993–94	(Argentina) Héctor Haile	Atlético Echagüe	52	271	5.2
1994–95	(Argentina) Facundo Sucatzky (1)	Independiente de General Pico	55	302	5.5
1995–96	(Argentina) Facundo Sucatzky (2)	Independiente de General Pico	52	393	7.6
1996–97	(Argentina) Facundo Sucatzky (3)	Independiente de General Pico	54	298	5.5
1997–98	(Argentina) Facundo Sucatzky (4)	Independiente de General Pico	48	293	6.1
1998–99	(Argentina) Facundo Sucatzky (5)	Independiente de General Pico	64	297	4.6
1999–00	(Argentina) Facundo Sucatzky (6)	Independiente de General Pico	48	268	5.6
2000–01	(Argentina) Facundo Sucatzky (7)	Libertad de Sunchales	58	324	5.6
2001–02	(Argentina) Facundo Sucatzky (8)	Libertad de Sunchales	51	377	7.4
2002–03	(Argentina) Facundo Sucatzky (9)	Libertad de Sunchales	40	364	9.1
2003–04	(Argentina) Facundo Sucatzky (10)	Atenas de Córdoba	53	302	5.7
2004–05	(Argentina) Pablo Rodríguez (1)	Peñarol de Mar del Plata	52	253	4.9
2005–06	(Argentina) Pablo Rodríguez (2)	Peñarol de Mar del Plata	48	287	6.0
2006–07	(Argentina) Sebastián Ginóbili	Quilmes de Mar del Plata	47	200	4.3
2007–08	(Paraguay) Javier Martínez	Regatas Corrientes	44	235	5.3
2008–09	(Argentina) Hernando Salles	Regatas Corrientes	47	224	4.8
2009–10	(Argentina) Luis Cequeira	Sionista	50	220	4.4
2010–11	(Argentina) Juan Ignacio Sánchez	Estudiantes de Bahía Blanca	44	305	6.9
2011–12	(Argentina) Facundo Campazzo (1)	Peñarol de Mar del Plata	59	350	5.9
2012–13	(Argentina) Facundo Campazzo (2)	Peñarol de Mar del Plata	52	315	6.1
2013–14	(Argentina) Facundo Campazzo (3)	Peñarol de Mar del Plata	51	302	5.9
2014–15	(United States) - (Argentina) Mac Hopson	Regatas Corrientes	54	322	6.0
2015–16	(Argentina) Franco Balbi (1)	Argentino de Junín	61	381	6.2
2016–17	(Argentina) Maximiliano Stanic (1)	Olímpico	62	399	6.4
2017–18	(Argentina) Maximiliano Stanic (2)	Olímpico	43	279	6.5
2018–19	(Argentina) Leandro Vildoza	Estudiantes Concordia	43	265	6.2
2019–20	(Brazil) Caio Pacheco (1)	Bahía Basket	21	126	6.0
2020–21	(Brazil) Caio Pacheco (2)	Bahía Basket	32	164	5.1
2021–22	(Argentina) Nicolás Aguirre	Regatas Corrientes	31	163	5.3
2022–23	(Argentina) Franco Balbi (2)	Boca Juniors	38	201	5.3
2023–24	(Argentina) Lucas Andújar	Zárate Basket	38	241	6.9

== All-time leaders ==
=== Most games played ===
As of 5 December 2018; player nationality by national team:

Pos.	Player	Games	Seasons
1	(Argentina) Leonardo Gutiérrez	1,106	23
2	(Argentina) Diego Osella	1,096	23
3	(Argentina) Gabriel Cocha	959	23
4	(Argentina) Sebastián Ginóbili	935	19
5	(Argentina) Bruno Lábaque	920	21
6	(Argentina) Diego Cavaco	916	19
7	(Argentina) Marcelo Milanesio	848	18
8	(Argentina) Facundo Sucatzky	839	20
9	(Argentina) Gabriel Díaz	822	20
10	(Argentina) Julio Rodríguez	808	19

=== All-Time top scorers by total points scored ===
As of December 2018; player nationality by national team:

Pos.	Player	Points	Seasons	Games
1	(Argentina) Héctor Campana	17,359	19	785
2	(Argentina) Julio Rodríguez	16,252	19	808
3	(Argentina) Leonardo Gutiérrez	14,531	23	1,106
4	(Argentina) Juan Espil	12,472	13	589
5	(Argentina) Diego Osella	12,358	23	1,096
6	(Argentina) Esteban Pérez	12,169	17	715
7	(United States) Byron Wilson	11,149	13	570
8	(Argentina) Marcelo Milanesio	10,835	18	848
9	(Argentina) Sebastián Ginóbili	10,791	19	935
10	(Argentina) Gabriel Cocha	10,761	23	959

=== All-Time top scorers by points per game ===
As of May 2024; player nationality by national team:

Pos.	Player	Points Per Game	Seasons
1	(Uruguay) Wilfredo "Fefo" Ruiz	28.8	5

== Players with the most championships won ==
- Player nationality by national team:
- 10×: (Argentina) Leo Gutiérrez: (1996, 1999, 2002, 2005, 2007, 2009, 2010, 2011, 2012, 2014)
- 7×: (Argentina) Héctor Campana: (1987, 1988, 1990, 1991, 1992, 1998, 1999)
- 7×: (Argentina) Marcelo Milanesio: (1987, 1988, 1990, 1992, 1998, 1999, 2002)
- 6×: (Argentina) Diego Osella: (1988, 1990, 1992, 1998, 1999, 2009)
- 6×: (Argentina) Martín Leiva: (2004, 2007, 2010, 2011, 2012, 2014)
- 6x: (Argentina) Marcos Mata: (2010, 2011, 2012, 2016, 2017, 2018)
- 5×: (Argentina) Gustavo Ismael Fernández: (1991, 1993, 1997, 2000, 2001)
- 5×: (Argentina) Bruno Lábaque: (1998, 1999, 2002, 2003, 2009)
- 5×: (Argentina) Diego Maggi: (1985, 1986, 1989, 1991, 1994)
- 4×: (Argentina) Andrés Pelussi: (1998, 2002, 2003, 2008)
- 4×: (Argentina) Germán Filloy: (1987, 1988, 1990, 1992)
- 4×: (Argentina) Alejandro Reinick: (2003, 2010, 2011, 2012)
- 4×: (Argentina) Facu Campazzo: (2010, 2011, 2012, 2014)
- 4×: (Argentina) Nicolás Aguirre: (2015, 2016, 2017, 2018)

== Championships won by head coach ==
Pos.	Coach	Titles	Years won
1	(Argentina) Sergio Hernández	6	2000, 2001, 2004, 2010, 2011, 2012
2	(Argentina) Julio Lamas	5	1997, 2005, 2008, 2016, 2017
3	(Argentina) Rubén Magnano	4	1992, 1998, 1999, 2009
4	(Argentina) Walter Garrone	3	1987, 1988, 1990
5	(Argentina) Luis Martínez	2	1985, 1986
5	(Argentina) Horacio Seguí	2	1996, 2002
6	(Argentina) León Najnudel	1	1989
6	(Argentina) Daniel Rodríguez	1	1991
6	(Argentina) Orlando Ferratto	1	1993
6	(Argentina) Néstor García	1	1994
6	(Argentina) Mario Guzmán	1	1995
6	(Argentina) Oscar Alberto Sánchez	1	2003
6	(Argentina) Fernando Duró	1	2006
6	(Argentina) Gabriel Picatto	1	2007
6	(Argentina) Nicolás Casalánguida	1	2013
6	(Argentina) Fernando Rivero	1	2014
6	(Argentina) Silvio Santander	1	2015
6	(Argentina) Gonzalo García	1	2018

== Bibliography ==
- Liga Nacional de Básquetbol Guía Oficial 2015/2016, pages 209–216.
