= Hernán Montenegro =

Argentine basketball player

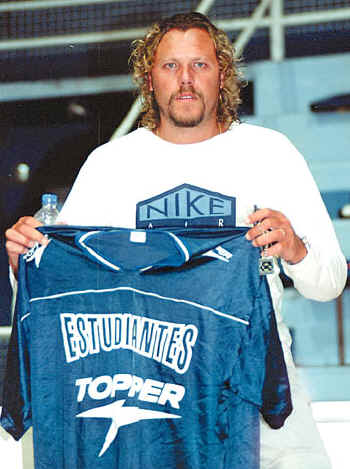
- Montenegro in 2009

Personal information
- Born: August 10, 1966 (age 60) Bahía Blanca, Buenos Aires Province
- Listed height: 2.06 m (6 ft 9 in)

Career information
- NBA draft: 1988: 3rd round, 57th
- Drafted by: Philadelphia 76ers
- Position: Center
- Number: 4, 8, 14, 22

Career history
- 1986: Olimpo
- 1987: Unión de Santa Fe
- 1988: Olimpo
- ?: Gigantes de Carolina
- 1989–90: Annabella Pavia
- 1990–91: Estudiantes (BB)
- 1992: Brescia
- 1993–94: GEPU San Luis
- 1994–95: Gimnasia y Esgrima (CR)
- 1995–96: Estudiantes (BB)
- 1996–97: Dep. Valle Inferior
- 1997: Guaiqueríes (Venezuela)
- 1997–98: Independiente (GP)
- 1998–99: Estudiantes (O)
- 1999–2000: Estudiantes (BB)
- 2001: Peñarol (MdP)
- 2006: Villa Mitre
- 2009: Obras Sanitarias
- 2010, 2012: Del Progreso (Viedma, Río Negro)

Career highlights
- Argentine League MVP (1995)
- Stats at Basketball Reference

Hernán Abel Montenegro (born August 8, 1966) is an Argentine former basketball player. He is considered one of the best Latin America centers ever by journalists and colleagues. Montenegro was also a very charismatic player, nicknamed "El Loco" ("The Crazy One" in Spanish), due to his eccentric behaviour on and off the court.

Due to his skill to play basketball, Montenegro has been compared with talented players such as Puerto Rican José Piculín Ortiz, Brazilian Oscar Schmidt or Spanish Fernando Martín Espina.

== Career ==
=== The beginning ===
Montenegro started to play basketball at 5 years old, taking advantage of his unusual height at that age. He debuted in the Senior category of Club Leandro N. Alem, playing with teammates 10 years older than him. He later played at Club Villa Mitre. In 1981, Montenegro was called to the youth Argentina national team to play the Pan American Games hosted in Montevideo.

Two years later, Montenegro disputed the Youth World Cup in Spain, where Argentina finished 7th. It was in that tournament when Montenegro was observed by a talent-searcher who was interested in his services; subsequently, he would later be signed by CAI Zaragoza at the age of 17.

=== Europe and NBA ===
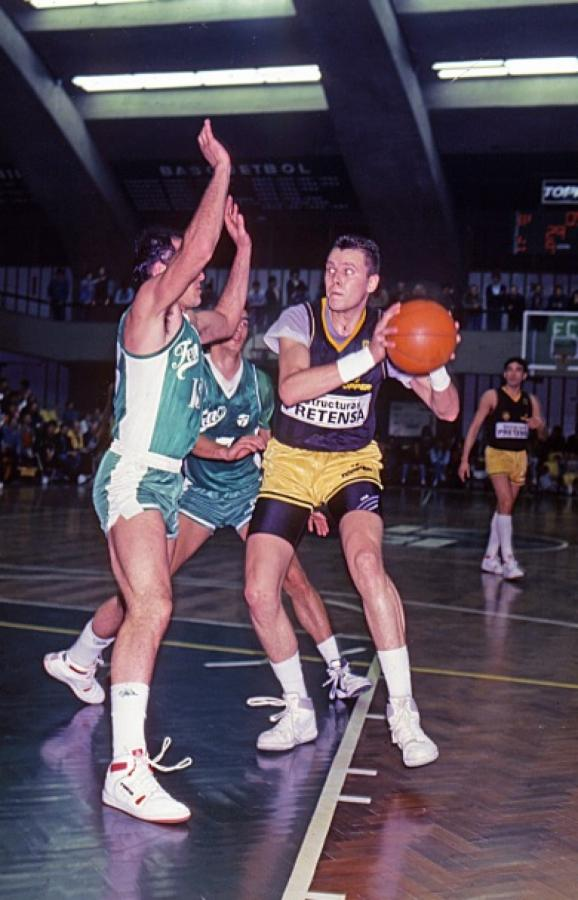
Montenegro playing for Olimpo v Ferro in 1988

In 1985, Montenegro was called to the Senior Argentina national basketball team for the first time to play the South American championship in Medellín. At the national level, he debuted in the Liga Nacional de Básquet (LNB) playing for Olimpo at age 19. Olimpo reached the finals of the LNB] that year although the team was defeated by Ferro Carril Oeste with Miguel Cortijo as its star player.

With the national team, Montenegro took part in the 1986 FIBA World Championship, where Argentina finished 12th. In 1987, Montenegro was traded to Unión de Santa Fe where after playing a few games, he returned to Olimpo for the play-offs.

In Puerto Rico, Montenegro was recruited by the Gigantes de Carolina, where he played 12 games averaging 10.2 rebounds per game. He later received a basketball scholarship to play at Louisiana State University of the NCAA, but after suffering a broken left ankle one day before the season started, he chose to end his college career because he needed to support his family. In the US, Montenegro took part in the 1988 NBA draft, being chosen in the 57th position by the Philadelphia Sixers and becoming along with Giant Jorge González (drafted #54), in the first Argentine players drafted in the NBA, although they would not play any official games after being released before the regular season started.

In 1989, Montenegro arrived to Italy in order to play for Annabella Pavia, a team of the second division. He played 43 matches with an average of 20 points and 10 rebounds per game.

=== Return to Argentina ===
Although Montenegro did not keep in mind coming back to Argentina, some disciplinary affairs and personal problems with the managers caused a premature return to his native country. The return to the Liga Nacional was in 1990, when Montenegro signed with Estudiantes de Bahía Blanca, his home town club. The matches of the 1990–91 season disputed for Estudiantes are considered the best Montenegro's performances of his career, leading a team where also played other prominent players such as Juan Espil, Javier Maretto and José Luis Gil. Estudiantes made a great campaign, reaching the Liga Nacional finals but the team was finally defeated by GEPU San Luis (a team that no longer exists), leadered by Héctor Campana. Montenegro finished the season with 22 points and 8.7 rebounds per game.

One of the most memorable moments was the semi-final disputed against Sport Club Cañadense that qualified Estudiantes to the final games. Montenegro shot to the basket, making a 2-point conversion at the same time the buzzer announced the end of the match.

=== 1992 Pre-Olympic Games ===
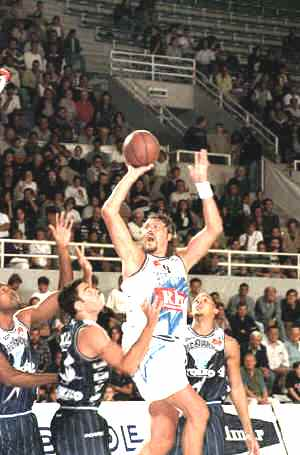
(Left): Montenegro with Argentina jumping against Charles Barkley at the 1992 Tournament of the Americas; (right): Montenegro trying to score during his last professional period in Argentina

Due to his good performances in the Liga Nacional, Montenegro was called again to the national team that disputed the 1992 Tournament of the Americas in Portland. Montenegro took part of a team that also had Marcelo Milanesio and Héctor Campana as relevant players. Argentina reached the semi-finals being defeated by the USA "Dream Team" (regarded as the best basketball team ever by journalists and experts) with Michael Jordan, Charles Barkley and Larry Bird as its outstanding players.

Just before that game, Montenegro had tattooed the number "22" in his nape (a number which means "the crazy man" in Argentina), causing that the American channel NBC's broadcaster said: "Tonight, Robinson and Ewing gonna dream on the 'crazy twenty-two'." Since then, Montenegro's partners, rivals and even journalists began to nickname him "El Loco" ("The Crazy", in Spanish), due his strange behaviour inside and outside the courts.

=== Late career ===
In 1992, Montenegro is transferred to Brescia, a team of the Italian Lega 2. Nevertheless, he soon returned to Argentina again to play the 1993–94 season for GEPU San Luis, and the next (1994–95) for Gimnasia y Esgrima de Comodoro Rivadavia where he achieved his best record in rebounds (8.8).

In 1995–96, Montenegro returned to Estudiantes and then he signed with Valle Inferior, a team from Viedma, Río Negro, playing only 11 matches and finishing that year in Venezuela Gauiqueries. The 1997–98 season found Montenegro defending the colors of Club Sportivo Independiente, playing along with raising star Andrés Nocioni.

=== Return and definite retirement ===
In February 2012, two years after his retirement, Montenegro signed with Del Progreso, a club from Río Negro Province, to play a new season of Torneo Federal, the third division of Argentine basketball league system.

Montenegro retired from basketball in April 2012, at the age of 45, due to heart problems. He announced his retirement through his official page on Facebook.

== Honors ==
Montenegro has awarded the following honors during his career:

- Winner of the 1991 Argentine League slam dunk contest.
- Argentine League MVP in 1995.
- Argentine League All-Star Game in 1991, 1995, 1998.

== In his own words ==
The talent for playing was something I would have not preferred to born with.

I have a very big problem, which usually happens to talented people... I have skills to make something that I could not be fulfilled with. I always had that inner struggle against basketball.

In my opinion, Beto Cabrera was better than Ginóbili. Manu is an extraordinary athlete and a very good player who quickly learnt all he needed to learn, but Ginóbili never was as talented as Cabrera, Pichi Campana or I were.

Cabrera played today's basketball, but 30 years before.

Goodbye, "Orange". (Note: Familiarly referring to the color of basketballs.) Thanks for everything you gave me, it's almost been 40 years together, beautiful and hard years but plenty of mutual respect... There was always this kind of necessary complicity to live a great love with passion!
