= Basketball in Argentina =

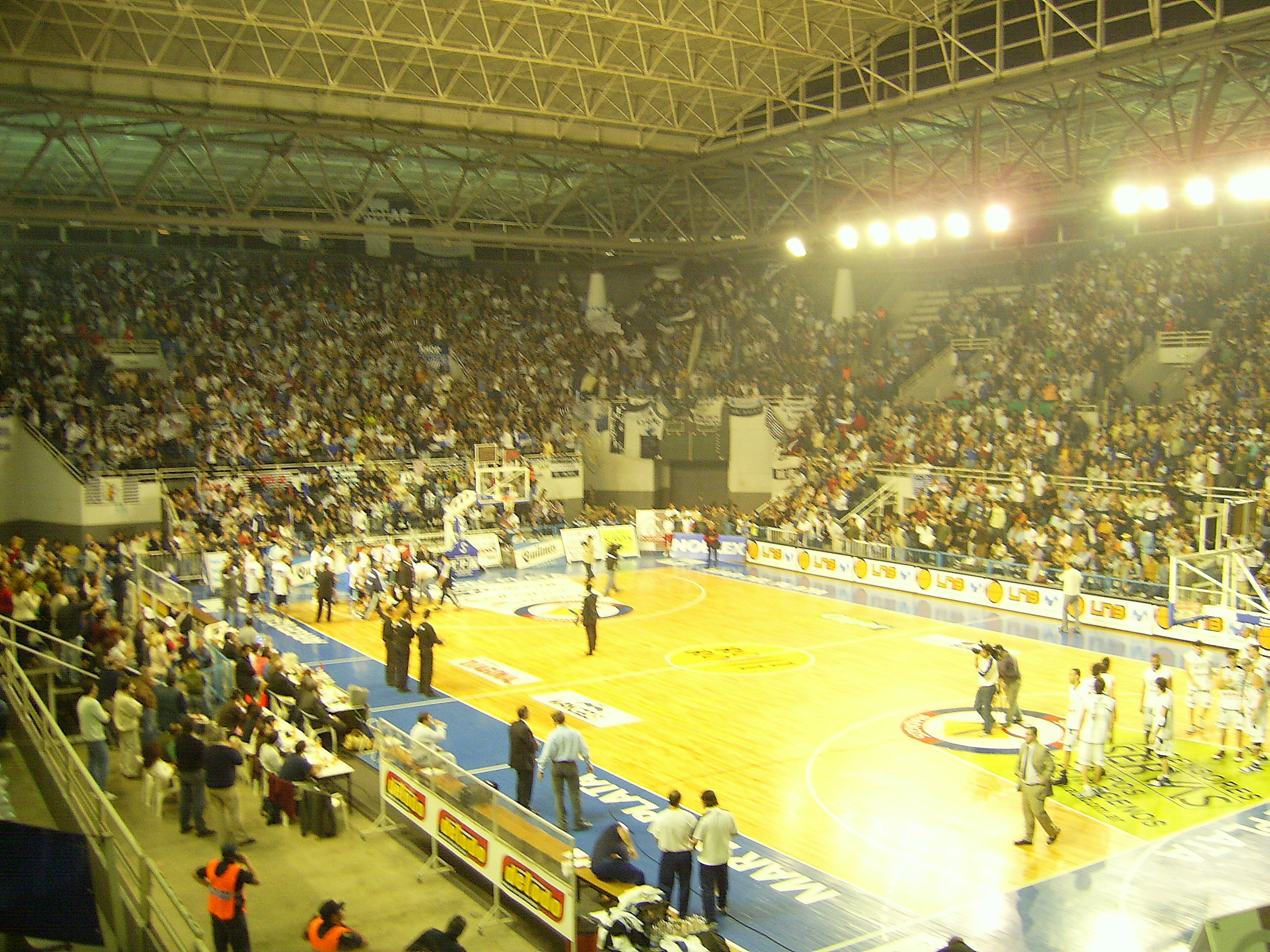
- Game at Polideportivo Islas Malvinas, crowd attendance: 8,000
- Country: Argentina
- Governing body: Argentine Basketball Confederation
- National team: Argentina
- First played: 1912

Club competitions
- Liga Nacional de Básquet; Liga Argentina de Básquet; Liga Federal (es)

International competitions
- FIBA World Cup; FIBA AmeriCup; South American Championship

Basketball was introduced in Argentina in 1912 by the "Asociación Cristiana de Jóvenes" (YMCA), with the first Federation created in 1921 to organise the competitions. In 1929, the Argentine Basketball Confederation ("Confederación Argentina de Basketball") was established. The body currently controls the Argentina national team.

The Campeonato Argentino de Clubes was the top clubs competition of Argentina until 1984 when the Liga Nacional was created as the request of León Najnudel. The league is controlled by the "Asociación de Clubes de Básquetbol"

Regarding the national team, Argentina is the only national team in the FIBA Americas zone that has won the quintuplet crown: FIBA World Cup (they won the first edition, in 1950), Olympic Gold Medal (2004) (the higher honor and most important title in the history of the national team), FIBA Diamond Ball (2008), FIBA AmeriCup (2001, 2011 and 2022) and Pan American Gold Medal (1995 and 2019). They have also won 13 South American Basketball Championships, as well as many youth championships.

The Argentine representative was also the first to defeat a United States national team with a full squad of NBA players. They did so by 87–80 in the 2002 FIBA World Championship held in Indianapolis.

== History ==
=== Beginning and consolidation ===
The practice of basketball in Argentina was started by Asociación Cristiana de Jóvenes (YMCA) in 1912. Canadian Professor Paul Phillip was in charge to teach basketball at YMCA headquarters in Paseo Colón Avenue, Buenos Aires.

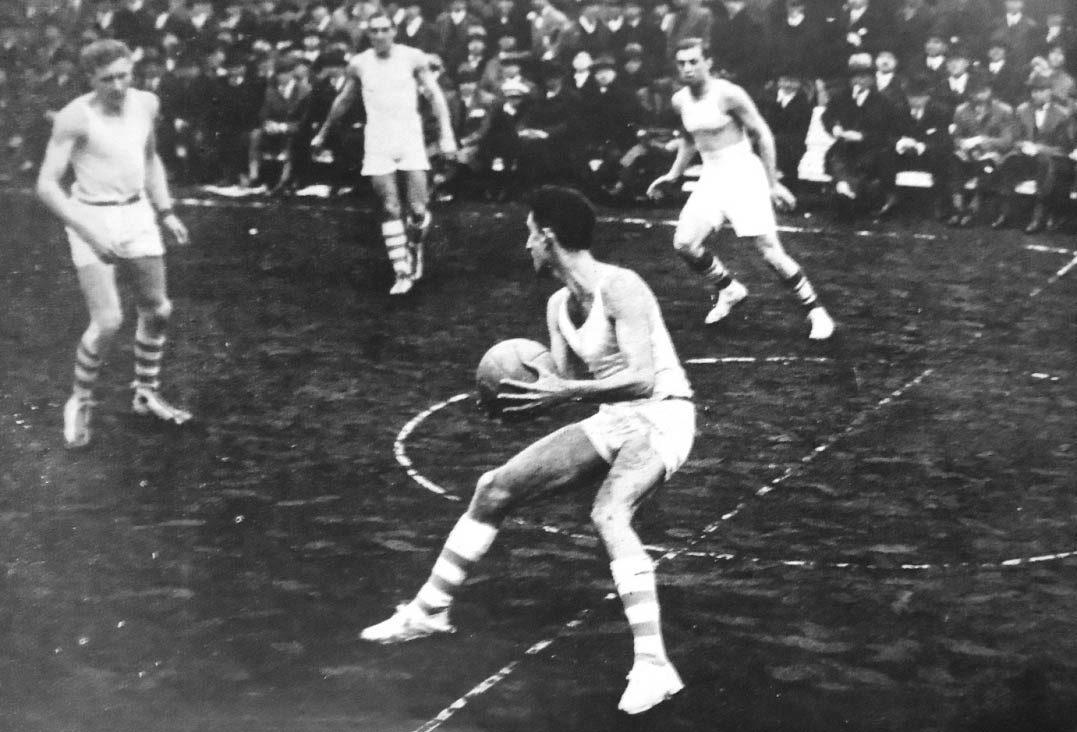
Argentina and Uruguay national sides, playing in 1925

The first basketball clubs in Argentina were YMCA, Hindú and Independiente. By 1912 the first basketball games were held by YMCA headquarters in Buenos Aires. In 1913 the first games between Argentine and Uruguayan YMCA are played. One year later, the YMCA organised the first internal championship. In 1919 the Uruguay national team played a game v. local team Nacional, in Buenos Aires.

In 1921 the "Argentine Basketball Federation" (original name: "Federación Argentina de Basket-Ball" – FABB) was established to organise competitions not only in Buenos Aires but in several cities around Argentina, such as Bahía Blanca and Córdoba where basketball would develop significantly in successive years. Argentina played its first international game (representing the FABB) against Uruguay in 1921. The players chosen to play that match were: S.G. Romero, J.C. Rodríguez Quiroga (captain), A. Birba, M. Hernandorena, J. Barbier.

The first "big" of Argentine basketball was Hindú, winning 5 consecutive titles (1922–26). In 1926 the team toured on Europe to play a series of friendly matches. Hindú played a total of 6 games, remaining unbeaten.

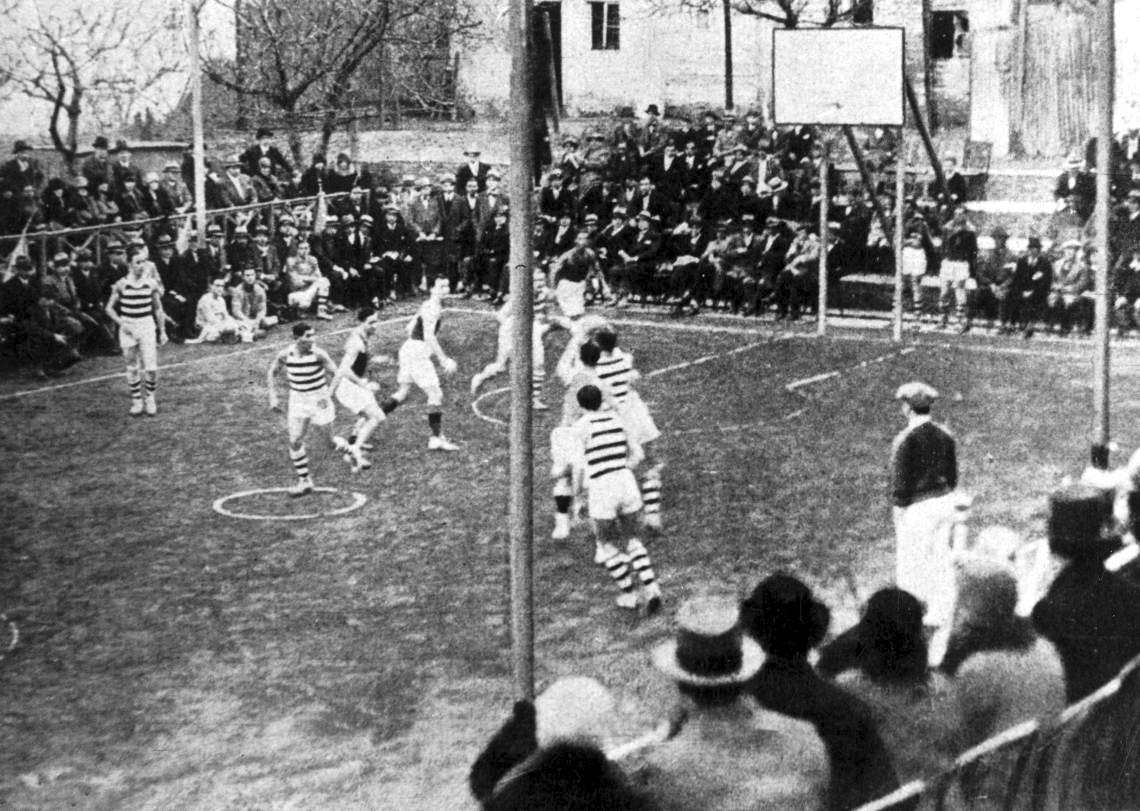
First game of Campeonato Argentino, Santa Fe v. Córdoba, 1928

In successive years, other clubs such as Ñaró, Estudiantes (LP), River Plate, Gimnasia y Esgrima, Universitario and Racing) registered their teams to the Federation. In 1928, the "Campeonato Argentino de Básquet" was created The competition was established in 1928 with the purpose of organising a competition for provincial representatives. Until then, there was only local leagues such as Torneo Metropolitano, where teams of Buenos Aires took part.

The first edition of Campeonato Argentino was held in the clay court field of YMCA of Buenos Aires. Santa Fe, Córdoba and two teams from FABB took part of the tournament. Córdoba was the first team outside Buenos Aires to win a championship, in 1932 and 1933. Other provincial sides such as Santa Fe (1934–1935) and Santiago del Estero (1937, with Rafael Lledó as notable player) would win their first national titles also.

Buenos Aires Province was the most winning team between 1966 and 1978, with Bahiense players Alberto Pedro Cabrera, Atilio Fruet and José De Lizaso, plus other players from La Plata, Gehrmann, Galliadi, Sfeir, Carlos González. Buenos Aires played 13 consecutive finals, winning 10 of them.

On August 30, 1929, the Argentine Basketball Federation (current "Confederación Argentina") was established, with founder members from Buenos Aires, Córdoba, Santa Fe, La Rioja, North Federation and Bahía Blanca. The Federación Argentina focused on the spread of basketball in Buenos Aires as in the rest of the provinces of Argentina.

=== Club competitions, 1936-1984 ===
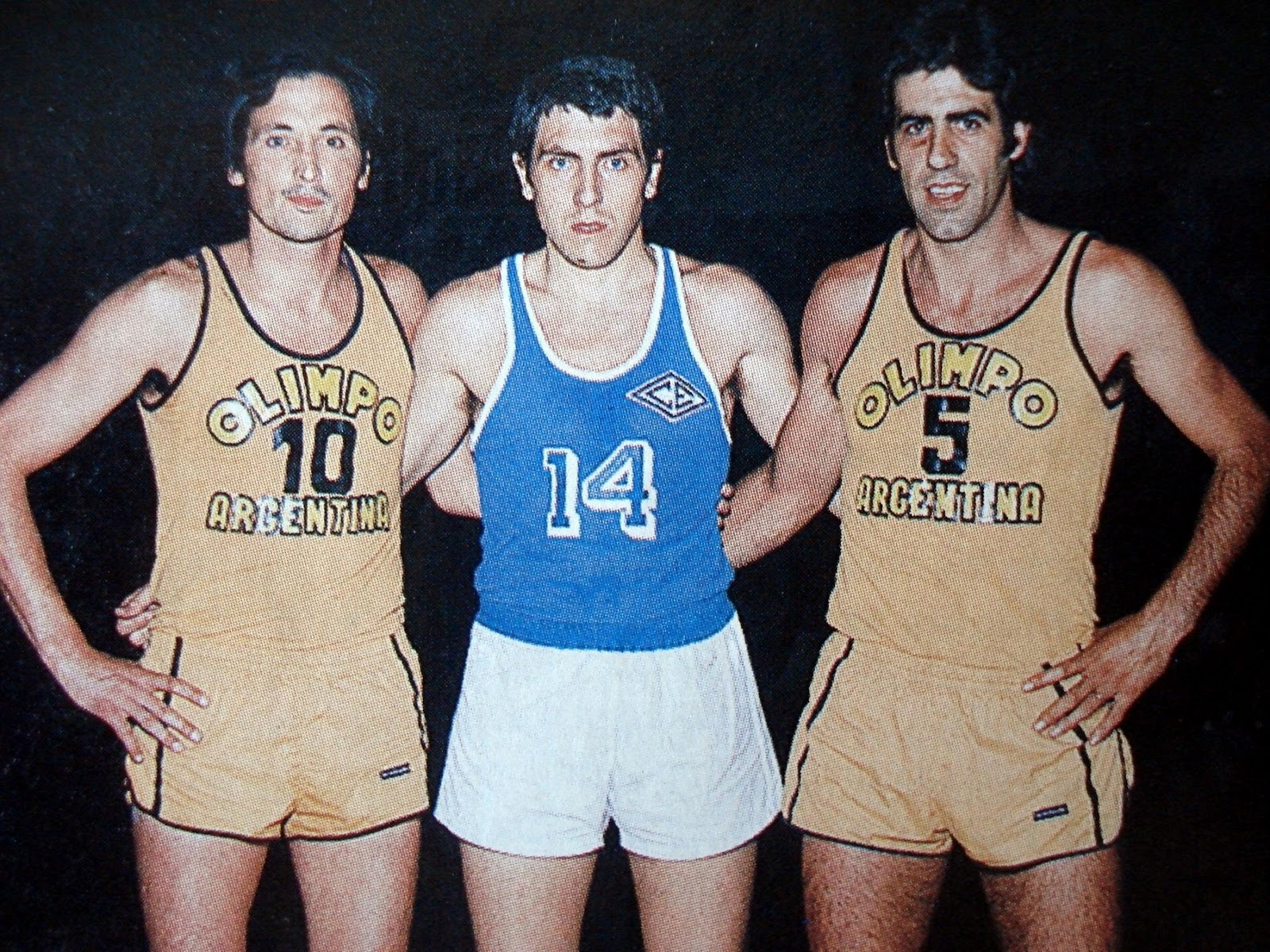
Atilio Fruet, Alberto Cabrera and José De Lizaso, The Three Musketeers of basketball

The Campeonato Argentino was the first club competition in Argentina, where the champions of each region took part. The first edition was held in 1936, being won by Huracán (Rosario). The last edition of Campeonato Argentino was held in 1984 and won by Deportivo San Andrés, a club from General San Martín Partido, after defeating River Plate at the finals. Obras Sanitarias was the most winning team with 3 championships (1975, 1976, 1982).

Some of the most notable players during those years were Atilio Fruet, José De Lizaso and Alberto Cabrera, who played for "Bahiense" teams Olimpo and Estudiantes respectively. They were nicknamed The Three Musketeers of basketball in the 1960s. Because of their contributions, Bahía Blanca was regarded as "the capital city of Argentine basketball".

In 1984 the competition was replaced by the Liga Nacional de Básquet.

=== Inception of Liga Nacional ===
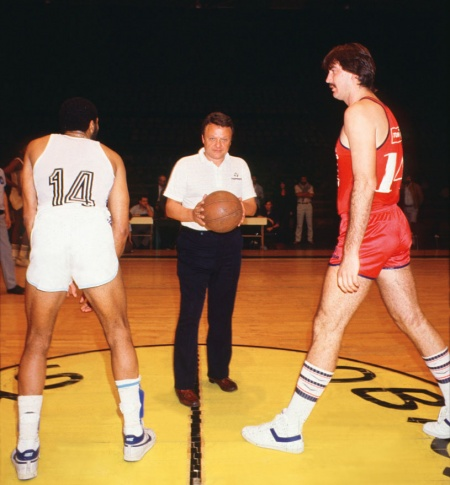
León Najnudel with the ball in the first LNB game ever: Argentino de Firmat v. San Lorenzo (in red uniform), 26 April 1985.

The Liga Nacional de Básquet was created through the efforts of basketball coach León Najnudel, and sports journalist Osvaldo Orcasitas, in the 1980s, to make Argentine men's club basketball more competitive, through the merging of the many existing local leagues. It is designed like the NBA, with a regular season, all-star game, and playoffs. However, unlike the NBA, the LNB has a promotion and relegation system, with the Torneo Nacional de Ascenso (TNA), the league level that is immediately below the LNB.

Before the league was established, the regular tournament was Campeonato Argentino de Clubes where teams from all the provinces took part. The league had a regional format and playoffs.

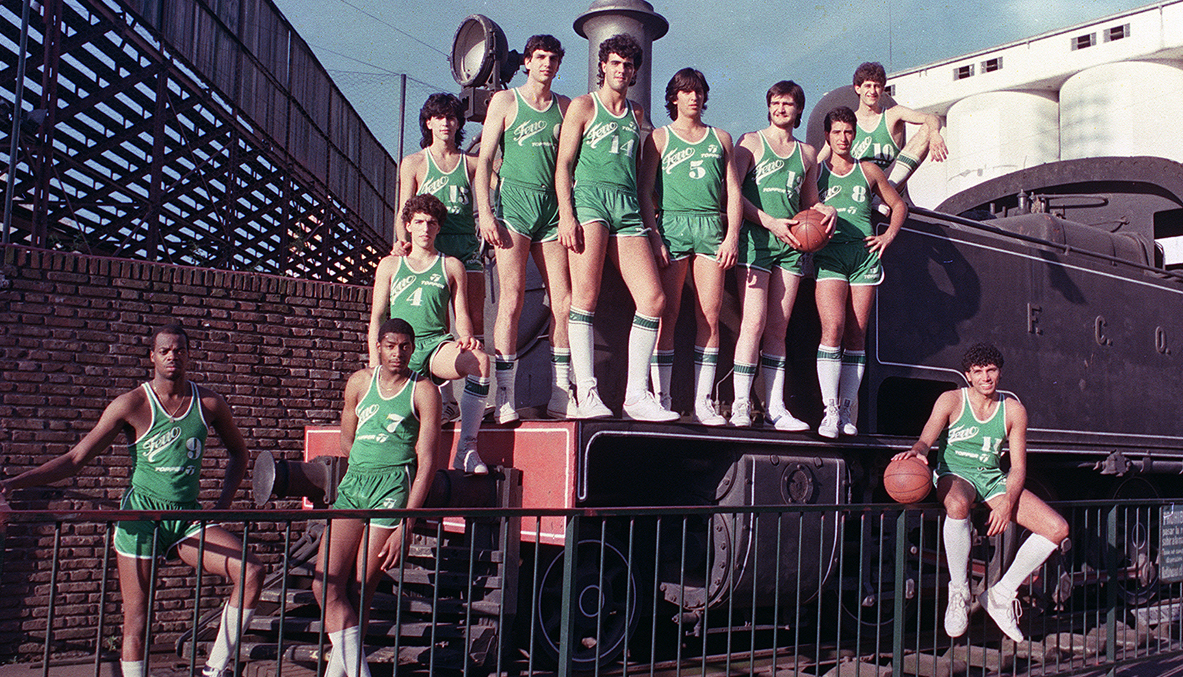
Ferro C. Oeste, the first champion of the LNB

For the 1984 edition there was 64 teams. The association decided to retire 10 teams, moving them to "Primera Nacional A". Of those teams, 4 were from city of Buenos Aires, and the provinces of Buenos Aires, Córdoba and Santa Fe were represented by 2 teams each.

Ferro Carril Oeste was the first LNB champion after defeating Atenas de Córdoba in 3 games. The next season (1986), Ferro Carril Oeste won its second consecutive title, beating Olimpo de Bahía Blanca in 5 games (3–1 on aggregate). The Verdolaga played its third consecutive final series in 1987, but was finally defeated by Atenas, that won the first of 9 titles, being the most winning LNB team to date.

In 1988 Atenas won a second championship beating River Plate and the next year Ferro won another title, being the only title won by León Najnudel as coach. Atenas won a total of 9 LNB titles, being the most winning team since the inception of the league in 1985.

In the 2011–12 season a third level of competition, the "Torneo Federal de Básquetbol", was created. The Federal encompassed a wide array of teams from all over the country, being organized by the Argentine Basketball Confederation.

== League system ==
Following a system similar to the European basketball leagues, there are two levels of competition: the Liga Nacional (LNB, first division) and Liga Argentina (formerly, "Torneo Nacional de Ascenso" – TNA, "National Promotion Tournament" in English, the second division). Both tournaments feature promotions and relegations and are organized by the "Asociación Argentina de Clubes" (Argentine Clubs Association).

== Competitions ==
Since the first tournament held in 1921, many competitions have been held in Argentine basketball. The list includes the following championships:

=== Current tournaments ===
Competition	Div.	Since
Liga Nacional de Básquet	1	1985
Liga Argentina de Básquet	2	1985
Liga Federal (es)	3	1992
Supercopa de la Liga (es)	1	2017
Copa Islas Malvinas (es)	1	2026
Campeonato Argentino (Note: The oldest active competition in Argentina, contested by teams representing Argentine's provincial sides.)	-	1928

=== Past tournaments ===
Competition	Div.	Years
Campeonato Argentino de Clubes	1	1936–1984
Copa de Campeones (es)	1	1997–2000
Torneo Top 4	1	2002–2004
Copa Argentina	1	2002–2010
Torneo Súper 8	1	2005–2014
Torneo Súper 20 (es)	1	2017–2021
Copa Súper 20 (es)	1	2023–2025
