= Bahía Basket =

- Leagues: LNB
- Founded: 25 May 2010; 15 years ago
- Arena: Dow Center
- Capacity: 4,000
- Location: Bahía Blanca, Buenos Aires Province, Argentina
- Team colors
- President: Juan Ignacio Sánchez
- Head coach: José L. Pisani
- Website: bahiabasket.com.ar
Home	Away

Bahía Basket is a professional Argentine basketball team based in Bahía Blanca, Buenos Aires Province. The club plays in the Liga Nacional de Básquet (LNB), the top division of the Argentine league system as a successor of Estudiantes de Bahía Blanca after the club sold its vacant position in the league.

Bahía Basket's first home venue was Estadio Osvaldo Casanova, rented to its owner, Estudiantes. Since 2020, Bahía Basket venue is the Dow Center, with capacity for 4,000 spectators.

== History ==
Bahía Basket began as a personal project of former player Pepe Sánchez in an attempt to keep Bahía Blanca's place in the top division of Argentine basketball.

Initially, the main sponsor of the project was the Weber Saint-Gobain Group, which gave assistant in administration issues, as a result, the first name of the team was "Weber Bahía Estudiantes".

One of the first by the committee was to refurbish the Osvaldo Casanova stadium, renovating its surface, grandstands and access. In addition, some players signed with the team, including Pepe Sánchez himself (at 34 years old) and Juan Espil. Other players that came to Bahía Basket were Lucas Faggiano, Pablo Gil, Facundo Giorgi, Ariel Eslava and Facundo Aguerre.

In June 2013, the Basketball Clubs Association forced Bahía Blanca Estudiantes to change its name, therefore it renamed "Bahía Basket". As the club did not have a venue to host its home games, it rented the Osvaldo Casanova Stadium, property of Estudiantes, to remain in the city. Sebastián Ginóbili was hired as head coach while a bunch of players added to the team. Some of them were Lucio Redivo, Gastón Whelan, Martín Ambrosino, Mateo Gaynor, Lisandro Rasio, Matías Nocedal, Diego Gerbaudo, Ivory Clark James and Nicolás Lauría.

Bahía Basket played a series of preseason games in China, a total of 10 matches there.

In April 2021, Bahía Basket was relegated to the second division, La Liga Argentina, after losing to Atenas 70–60.

== Facilities ==
Bahía Basket venue is the "Dow Center" (named for sponsorship reasons), a modern training center that includes 3 training courts and a stadium for 4,000 spectators. The center also has offices, gym, medical ward, videoconferencing room, and even an art center for players. Down Center was thought to become the main training center in Latin America. Dow Center is a 7,500m2 sustainable building inspired on university campus and training facilities of the United States.

Until the Dow Center was inaugurated, the senior team trained at "Polideportivo Norte", built on abandoned sheds. It is currently used for the youth divisions.

All must be started in 1996, when I went to my first training at the University of Temple. I remember it well: I entered the stadium and didn't want to go out. I was astounded... that sense of motivation is what we aim to recreate here. This is what I would like to have experienced before departing to the United States...

— Pepe Sánchez talking about the Dow Center, January 2020

== Players ==
=== Current roster ===
Note: Flags indicate national team eligibility at FIBA-sanctioned events. Players may hold other non-FIBA nationalities not displayed.

Bahía Basket roster
Players
Coaches

Pos.	No.	Nat.	Name	Ht.	Age
PG	0	(Argentina)	Paz, Ezequiel	1.90 m (6 ft 3 in)	24 – 20 July 2001
SG	2	(Argentina)	Tolosa, Facundo	1.82 m (6 ft 0 in)	23 – 12 April 2002
PF	6	(Argentina)	Lugarini, Bautista	2.01 m (6 ft 7 in)	24 – 31 January 2001
SG	8	(Argentina)	Marini, Juan Cruz	1.90 m (6 ft 3 in)	25 – 8 February 2000
PG	9	(Brazil)	Pacheco, Caio	1.90 m (6 ft 3 in)	26 – 22 February 1999
PF	11	(Argentina)	Chapero, Tomás	2.06 m (6 ft 9 in)	24 – 10 June 2001
SG	12	(Argentina)	González, Joaquín	1.88 m (6 ft 2 in)	24 – 16 January 2001
PF	13	(Brazil)	Paulichi, Rafael	1.78 m (5 ft 10 in)	27 – 25 May 1998
SG	16	(Argentina)	Elías, Federico	1.88 m (6 ft 2 in)	25 – 24 September 1999
PF	17	(Brazil)	Novaes Souza, Gabriel	2.07 m (6 ft 9 in)	24 – 16 February 2001
PF	18	(Brazil)	Languas, Pedro	2.03 m (6 ft 8 in)	27 – 16 March 1998
PF	20	(United States)	Martin, Drew	2.03 m (6 ft 8 in)	31 – 26 April 1994
SF	22	(Argentina)	Ruesga, Fausto	1.98 m (6 ft 6 in)	25 – 18 July 2000
PG	23	(United States)	Weatherington, Travis	1.88 m (6 ft 2 in)	29 – 13 November 1995
PF	24	(Panama)	Levy, Jamaal	2.06 m (6 ft 9 in)	43 – 8 January 1982
PG	31	(United States)	Lynch, John	1.78 m (5 ft 10 in)	32 – 15 November 1992

Head coach

- (Argentina) José Luis Pisani

Assistant coach(es)

- (Argentina) Juan Milito

Legend

- (C) Team captain
- Injured

- Roster
Updated: 2020-3-14

=== Notable players ===
Note: Flags indicate national team eligibility at FIBA-sanctioned events. Players may hold other non-FIBA nationalities not displayed.

Criteria

To appear in this section a player must have either:

- Set a club record or won an individual award while at the club
- Played at least one official international match for their national team at any time
- Played at least one official NBA match at any time.

- (Argentina) Juan Ignacio Sánchez (2010–13)
- (Argentina) Juan Espil (2010–12)
- (Argentina) Víctor Baldo
- (Argentina) Hernán Jasen (2012–18)
- (Argentina) Lucio Redivo (2012–17)
- (Argentina) Juan Pablo Vaulet (2014)
- (Panama) Trevor Gaskins (2014–15)
- (United States) Ed Nelson (2010–11)

=== Retired numbers ===
As Bahía Basket is recognised as a continuity of Estudiantes in the LNB, the club retired the same numbers than its predecessor.

Bahía Basket retired numbers
N°	Nat.	Player	Position	Tenure	Date of retirement
5	(Argentina)	Hernán Jasen	SF	2012–18 (Note: It counts only the tenure in the franchise. He also played for Estudiantes in 1996–99)	2018
10	(Argentina)	Juan Espil	SG	2010–12 (Note: It counts only the tenure in the franchise. He also played for Estudiantes in 1988–92)	22 February 2013
14	(Argentina)	Alberto Cabrera	PG	1961–1984 (Note: Although Cabrera did not play for Bahía Basket (he left basketball in 1984), the number 14 is also retired in the franchise.)	3 October 2004
