= Diego Acoglanis =

Argentine footballer

Personal information
- Full name: Diego Hernán Acoglanis
- Date of birth: 3 February 1982 (age 44)
- Place of birth: Córdoba, Argentina
- Height: 1.75 m (5 ft 9 in)
- Position: Midfielder

Team information
- Current team: Central Córdoba Rosario (assistant)

Youth career
- Newell's Old Boys
- Rosario Central

Senior career*
Years	Team	Apps	(Gls)
2002-2003	Rosario Central	0	(0)
2004–2005	Central Córdoba Rosario	46	(0)
2006	Coquimbo Unido	4	(0)
2006–2007	Lalín	–	(–)
2007–2008	Nuovo Campobasso	32	(1)
2008–2009	Hirpinia	–	(–)
2009–2010	Juve Stabia	24	(1)
2010	Fidene	2	(0)
2010–2011	Avellino	12	(1)
2011–2012	Paganese	7	(0)
2012–2013	Tiro Federal	21	(1)
2014	El Porvenir del Norte	–	(–)
2015	Coronel Aguirre	23	(2)
2016	ADIUR	–	(–)
2016	PSM Fútbol	13	(2)
2017	Cañadense	–	(–)
2017	Belgrano San Nicolás	18	(1)
2018	Unión Arroyo Seco	–	(–)
Total		202	(9)

Managerial career
- 2019: Tiro Federal
- 2020: Arroyo Seco Athletic
- 2021: Argentino de Rosario (assistant)
- 2022–2023: Argentino de Rosario
- 2023–2024: Arroyo Seco Athletic
- 2024–: Central Córdoba Rosario (assistant)
- * Club domestic league appearances and goals

Diego Hernán Acoglanis (born 3 February 1982) is an Argentine football manager and former player who played as a midfielder.

== Playing career ==
Acoglanis was with Newell's Old Boys before joining Rosario Central, with whom he started his career. He made his debut with Central Córdoba de Rosario in the Argentine Primera B.

In 2006, he moved abroad and signed with Coquimbo Unido in the Chilean Primera División. In August of the same year, he moved to Europe and signed with Spanish club Lalín.

From 2007 to 2012, he played for clubs in the minor categories in Italy, such as Nuovo Campobasso, Juve Stabia, among others.

He returned to Argentina in 2012 and signed with Tiro Federal from Rosario.

In his last years, he played at minor categories of the Argentine football for clubs such as El Porvenir del Norte, Coronel Aguirre, ADIUR, PSM Fútbol, Cañadense, among others.

== Coaching career ==
Following his retirement, Acloglanis started his coaching career with Tiro Federal in 2019.

In 2022 and 2023, he led Argentino de Rosario and won the 2022 Copa Santa Fe, the first official title for the club. After, he coached Arroyo Seco Athletic Club before joining the technical staff of Daniel Teglia as assistant coach in Central Córdoba Rosario in April 2024.

== Personal life ==
Acoglanis holds Italian citizenship.

He is nicknamed Tata.

His brother, Leonardo, is a football coach with whom he has worked in Argentino de Rosario.
