= Ed Nelson (basketball) =

American basketball player (born 1982)

Personal information
- Born: March 18, 1982 (age 44) Brockton, Massachusetts, U.S.
- Listed height: 6 ft 8 in (2.03 m)
- Listed weight: 255 lb (116 kg)

Career information
- High school: St. Thomas Aquinas (Fort Lauderdale, Florida)
- College: Georgia Tech (2001–2003); UConn (2004–2006)
- NBA draft: 2006: undrafted
- Playing career: 2006–2014
- Position: Power forward / center

Career highlights
- Argentine League Top Scorer (2009); ACC Rookie of the Year (2002)

Edward Richard Nelson (born March 18, 1982) is an American professional basketball player and former ACC Rookie of the Year. A 2004 NCAA Champion with Connecticut, he retired from professional basketball in 2015.

== High school ==
Nelson was rated one of the top 25 high school basketball players in America by Sports Illustrated and was named Florida Player of the Year by USA Today. He averaged 26 points and 11 rebounds per game as a senior and led St. Thomas Aquinas to the Class 5A state title, with a 29–3 record. He was named the state Player of the Year for Class 6A-5A-4A by the Fort Lauderdale Sun-Sentinel and was Most Valuable Player of the state tournament, including 29 points and 10 rebounds in the semifinal game. He was named to the first-team all-county by the Miami Herald and scored a season-high 39 points on two occasions. He was one of 14 players selected for the Capital Classic all-star game at the MCI Center in Washington, D.C.

Nelson averaged 21.5 points and 9.3 rebounds as a junior, leading his team to a 30–4 record and a berth in the 5A state championship game. He also reached the state title game as a sophomore, when he helped St. Thomas Aquinas to a 23–9 record while averaging 12.4 points, eight rebounds, and 2.3 assists per game. The team was coached by Steve Strand.

== College career ==
Nelson began his college basketball career as a power forward for Georgia Tech in 2001. He won the ACC's Rookie of the Year award in 2002. After two years, he transferred to the University of Connecticut to be closer to his family.

=== Sports Illustrated cover ===
In 2005, Nelson appeared on the cover of Sports Illustrated.

== Professional career ==
In the summer 2007, Nelson had NBA workouts with Memphis Grizzlies, New Orleans Hornets and Toronto Raptors. In 2009, he played for Estudiantes de Bahía Blanca in the Liga Nacional de Básquet (Argentine first division), where he was the teammate of former NBA point guard Pepe Sánchez. Nelson was the leading scorer of the Liga Nacional de Básquet in the 2008–09 season, averaging 20.1 points per game and 8.4 rebounds per game. He played one season for Regatas, one for Quilmes de Mar del Plata, and one more in Bahía Basket, before becoming a player of Gimnasia Indalo.

== Television ==
Nelson appeared on the ESPN hit show Outside the Lines. It was a short documentary about his transition from a college basketball star to an NFL tight end. Nelson was discovered and signed by top NFL agent Joe Linta. Over 15 NFL scouts came to watch the 6'8 255 pound Nelson do a private workout with San Diego Chargers tight ends coach Rob Chudzinski on the UConn Campus. Nelson showcased good speed and catching ability, and surprised most scouts when he showcased a 34-inch vertical jump. On Draft Day 2006 Ed Nelson signed with the St. Louis Rams.
