= Drew Martin =

American basketball player (born 1994)

Bahía Basket
- Position: Forward
- League: Liga Nacional de Básquet

Personal information
- Born: April 26, 1994 (age 32)
- Listed height: 6 ft 8 in (2.03 m)
- Listed weight: 210 lb (95 kg)

Career information
- High school: Sunset (Beaverton, Oregon)
- College: New Mexico Highlands (2012–2014); Concordia (Oregon) (2015–2017)
- NBA draft: 2017: undrafted
- Playing career: 2017–present

Career history
- 2017–2018: Tokyo Cinq Reves
- 2018–2019: Verdirrojo de Montevideo
- 2019-2019: Bahía Basket

Drew Martin (born April 26, 1994) is an American professional basketball player who played last for Bahía Basket of the Argentine Liga Nacional de Básquet.

== Professional career ==
Martin started his professional career with BBC US Hiefenech Heffingen in the Total League before signing with Tokyo Cinq Reves in the B.League during the 2017–2018 season, where he went on to average 17.9 points and 7.4 rebounds per game. After starting the season with Verdirrojo de Montevideo in the Liga Uruguaya de Basketball, Martin signed with Bahía Basket of the Argentine Liga Nacional de Básquet in January 2019. He was released by Bahía in end of April 2019.
