= Héctor Campana =

Argentine basketball player

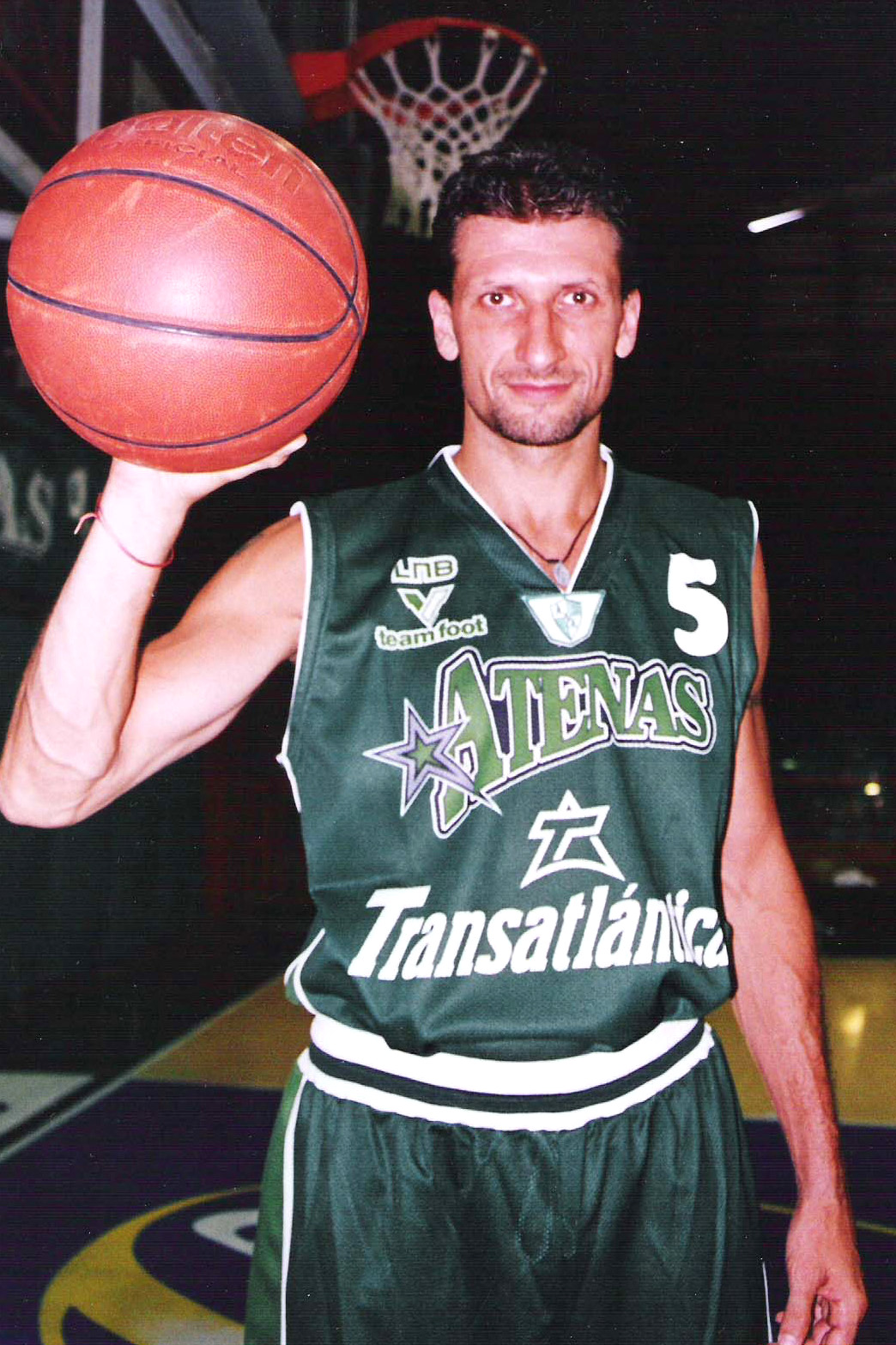
- Campana with Atenas in 2004

Personal information
- Born: November 10, 1964 (age 62) Córdoba, Argentina
- Listed height: 1.85 m (6 ft 1 in)
- Listed weight: 82 kg (181 lb)

Career information
- Playing career: 1976–2004
- Position: Shooting guard
- Number: 5

Career history
- 1976–1982: Redes Cordobesas
- 1982–1985: Obras Sanitarias
- 1985–1986: Sport Club Cañadense
- 1987–1988: Atenas
- 1989–1990: River Plate
- 1990–1991: GEPU
- 1991–1992: Atenas
- 1992–1993: Banco de Córdoba
- 1993–1995: Olimpia de Venado Tuerto
- 1995–1996: Peñarol
- 1996–2000: Atenas
- 2000–2002: Boca Juniors
- 2002–2004: Atenas

Career highlights
- FIBA Intercontinental Cup champion (1983); Pan American Club Championship champion (1996); 3× FIBA South American League champion (1997, 1998, 2004); FIBA South American League MVP (2004); 7× Argentine National League champion (1987, 1988, 1990, 1991, 1992, 1998, 1999); 4× Argentine National League MVP (1989, 1990, 1991, 1999); 3× Argentine National League Finals MVP (1987, 1991, 1992); 4× Argentine National League Top Scorer (1989, 1990, 1991, 1992); 15× Argentine National League All-Star (1988-1990, 1992, 1993, 1995-2001, 2003, 2004, 2022); Argentine National League All-Star Game Slam Dunk Champion (1990); Argentine National League All-Star Game 3-Point Shootout Champion (1995); Argentine National League All-Time Top Scorer; N° 5 jersey retired by Atenas (2005)
Medals
Men's basketball
Representing Argentina
FIBA South American Championship
Silver medal – second place	1989 Ecuador
Bronze medal – third place	1985 Colombia

Héctor Oscar "Pichi" Campana Marcomini (born November 10, 1964) is an Argentine former professional basketball player, and the former Vice Governor of his native Córdoba Province, in Argentina, serving for the Justicialist Party, from 2007 to 2011. During his basketball career, while playing at the club level, Campana won the FIBA Intercontinental Cup championship in 1983, the Pan American Club Championship in 1996, three FIBA South American League championships, in 1997, 1998, and 2004, and a total of seven LNB (Argentine First Division) championships. Campana is also the all-time top scorer in the top-tier level league in Argentina, the Liga Nacional de Básquet (LNB), with 17,359 points.

Campana also played with the senior Argentine national team, and he represented Argentina at the FIBA World Cups editions of 1986, 1990, and 1994. He has also participated in a record 15 Argentine All-Star Games with the last being in 2022, eighteen years after his retirement.

== Professional career ==
Campana started his pro club career with Redes Cordobesas, in the Córdoba Province local league, in 1976. He subsequently joined the Buenos Aires side Obras Sanitarias, in 1982, and debuted with the club in the Liga Nacional de Básquet (Argentine First Division) in 1984, the year of the league's inception. During his 28-year-long club career, he played exclusively in Argentina. The shooting guard had four spells with Córdoba's biggest team, Atenas, which was the club that he retired with in 2004, at the age of 39.

Campana was the Argentine National League Final's MVP three times, twice with Atenas (1987 and 1991–92), and once with Gimnasia y Esgrima y Pedernera Unidos (GEPU) (1990–91). He was also named the league's season MVP four times, twice with River Plate (1989 and 1990), once with GEPU (1990–91), and once with Atenas (1998–99). Campana's four league MVP selections is an Argentine National League record that he shares with Leonardo Gutiérrez. Campana was also the league's top scorer in four consecutive seasons, from 1989 to 1991–92. Moreover, Campana's seven Argentine National League championships are tied with Marcelo Milanesio, for the second most ever in the league's history, behind only Leonardo Gutiérrez's ten league championships. The most points he ever scored in a single game, in Argentina's top-tier level league, was 62 points, in a game during the 1990 season.

== National team career ==
=== Argentine junior national team ===
Campana was a member of the junior youth national teams of Argentina. With Argentina's junior national team, he played at the 1982 FIBA South American Youth Championship, the 1982 Pan American Youth Championship, and the 1983 FIBA Under-19 World Cup.

=== Argentine senior national team ===
Campana was a member of the senior men's Argentine national team. He played with Argentina at the following tournaments: the 1985 FIBA South American Championship, the 1986 FIBA World Cup, the 1989 FIBA South American Championship, the 1990 FIBA World Cup, the 1992 FIBA AmeriCup, the 1994 Goodwill Games, the 1994 FIBA World Cup, and the 1997 FIBA AmeriCup.

== Political career ==
After he retired from playing professional club basketball, Campana started a political career. As a member of the Justicialist Party, he was elected the Vice Governor of Córdoba Province, in Argentina. He served in that governmental position from 2007 to 2011.

== Personal life ==
Campana's daughter was diagnosed with a heart condition, while she was still in utero. She has therefore had to go through a total of 11 cardiac procedures since she was born. As a consequence, Campana founded the Fundación Corazoncito (in English: Little Heart Foundation), that helps to build hospital infrastructures and to train Cordobese medics abroad.

== Honours and awards ==
Club

Atenas:

- Argentine National League (6): 1987, 1988, 1990, 1991–92, 1997–98, 1998–99
- FIBA South American League (3): 1997, 1998, 2004

GEPU:

- Argentine National League (1): 1990–91

Individual

- Argentine National League Finals MVP (3): (1987, 1991, 1992)
- Argentine National League MVP (4): (1989, 1990, 1991, 1999)
- Argentine National League Top Scorer (4): (1989, 1990, 1991, 1992)
- FIBA South American League MVP (1): 2004
- Argentine National League All-Time Top Scorer
- Number 5 jersey retired by Atenas: (2005)
