= Wilfredo Ruiz =

Uruguayan basketball player

Wilfredo "Fefo" Ruiz
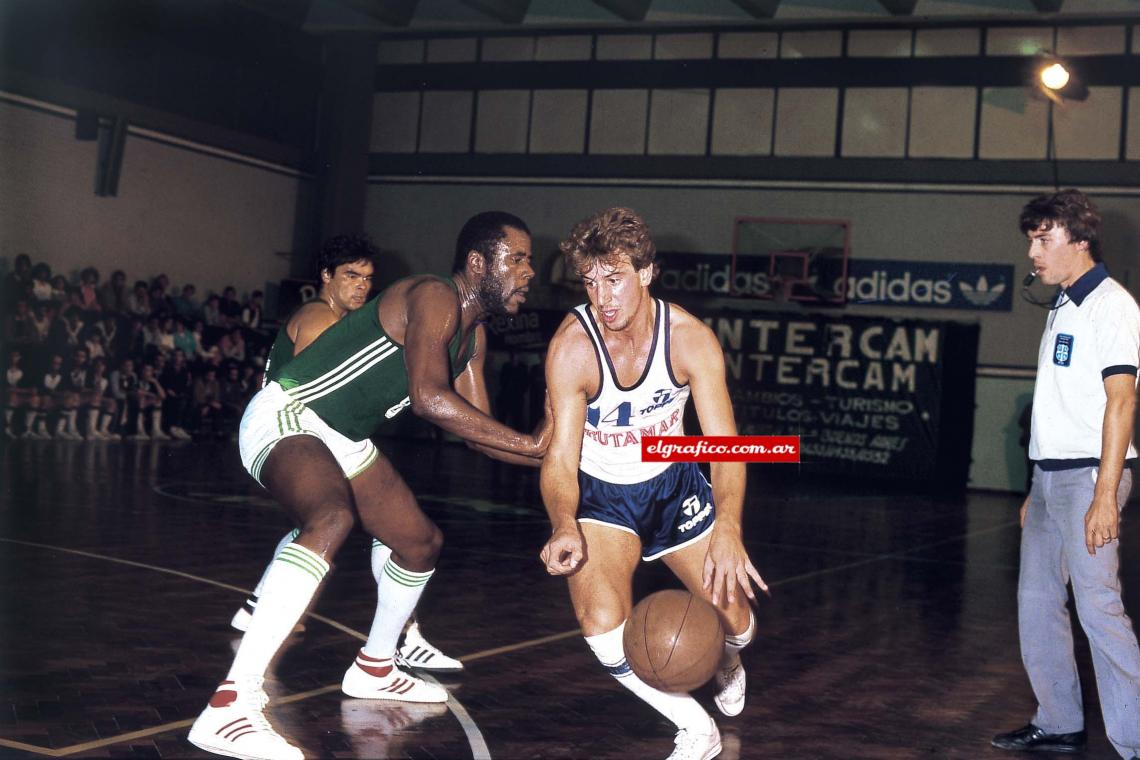
- Ruiz (#14 in white with the ball), playing with the Argentine League club Estudiantes BB.

Personal information
- Born: January 6, 1961 Montevideo, Uruguay
- Listed height: 6 ft 4 in (1.93 m)
- Listed weight: 185 lb (84 kg)

Career information
- Playing career: 1976–2002
- Position: Shooting guard / Small forward

Career history
- 1976–1979: Atlético Welcome
- 1980–1982: Atlético Aguada
- 1982: Atlético Peñarol
- 1982: Club Atlético Bohemios
- 1983–1985: Club Neptuno
- 1985–1987: Estudiantes de Bahía Blanca
- 1987: Nacional
- 1987–1989: Olimpo de Bahía Blanca
- 1989: Monte Líbano
- 1989: Mérida
- 1990: Atlético Welcome
- 1990: Club Neptuno
- 1991: Atlético Peñarol
- 1992–1997: Atlético Welcome
- 1997: Nacional
- 1998: Club Neptuno
- 2001: Club Ferro Carril de Salto
- 2002: Club Universitario de Salto

Career highlights
- FIBA South American Championship Top Scorer (1981); 3× Argentine National League Top Scorer (1985–1987); 4× Uruguayan Federal Championship Top Scorer (1981–1984); Uruguayan Federal Championship All-Time Top Scorer
Medals
Men's basketball
Representing Uruguay
FIBA AmeriCup
Silver medal – second place	1984 Brazil
FIBA South American Championship
Gold medal – first place	1981 Uruguay
Bronze medal – third place	1983 Brazil
Silver medal – second place	1985 Colombia

Wilfredo Eduardo "Fefo" Ruiz Bruno (born January 6, 1961) is a retired Uruguayan professional basketball player. At a height of 1.93 m (6 ft 4 in) tall, and a weight of 84 kg (185 lb), he played at the shooting guard and small forward positions. He holds the all-time career record for the most total points scored in the Uruguayan Federal Championship (CFB). He also holds the all-time career record for the highest points per game scoring average in the history of the Argentine National League (LNB).

== Professional career ==
During his club basketball career, Ruiz played in Uruguay, Argentina, and Brazil. In 1979, when he played with Atlético Welcome, Ruiz had a 70-point game in the Uruguayan Second Division. On 12 November 1983, while playing with Club Neptuno, he set the Uruguayan Federal Championship (Uruguayan First Division)'s all-time single game scoring record, when he scored 84 points in a league game against Colón.

In that same Uruguayan Federal Championship 1983 season, he also had a 70-point game against Bohemios, on 7 November 1983, and a 72-point game against Hebraica Macabi. His scoring average during the Uruguayan Federal Championship 1984 season was 50.8 points per game. He finished his career in Uruguay as the Uruguayan Federal Championship (CFB)'s all-time leader in career points scored, having scored a total of 18,512 points in the league.

As a member of Estudiantes de Bahía Blanca, of the top-tier level Argentine National League (LNB), he was the league's best scorer, during its first three years of existence (1985–1987). He averaged 32.9 points per in the Argentine LNB League's 1985 season, 31.5 points per game in the Argentine LNB League's 1986 season, and 30.4 points per game in the Argentine LNB League's 1987 season. The most points he ever scored in a single game, in the top-tier level Argentine League, was 60 points, in a game during the 1985 season. He is the all-time leader in scoring average, in the history of the Argentine National League, with a career scoring average of 28.8 points per game.

== National team career ==
In the FIBA World Cup of 1982, while playing with the senior men's Uruguayan national team, Ruiz averaged 23.4 points per game. At the FIBA Summer Olympic Games in Los Angeles, in 1984, Ruiz was one of the leaders of the Uruguayan national team, along with Carlos Peinado and Horacio “Tato” López. The team finished the tournament in sixth place, and Ruiz averaged 19.5 points per game during the tournament.
