= Argentine Basketball Confederation =

Governing basketball body of Argentina

Argentine Basketball Confederation Confederación Argentina de Básquetbol
- Sport: Basketball
- Jurisdiction: Argentina
- Abbreviation: CAB (formerly CABB)
- Founded: 30 August 1929; 96 years ago
- Affiliation: FIBA
- Affiliation date: FIBA: 18 June 1932; 93 years ago FIBA Americas: 11 October 1975; 50 years ago
- Regional affiliation: FIBA Americas
- Headquarters: Buenos Aires
- Location: Montevideo 496
- President: Sergio Gatti
- Vice president: Oscar Ledesma Abdala
- Secretary: Santiago Losada

Official website
- argentina.basketball
- (Argentina)

The Argentine Basketball Confederation (Spanish: Confederación Argentina de Básquetbol, (Note: The word básquetbol is specific to Rioplatense Spanish, the standard Spanish dialect of Argentina. In most other forms of Spanish, this word would be baloncesto.) also known as CAB, formerly CABB) is the governing body of basketball in Argentina. It is also one of the founding members of the International Basketball Federation (FIBA), in 1932.

It is a member of the FIBA Americas, and it is responsible for the Men's and the Women's national teams. Currently there are approximately 1,200 clubs registered with the association, as well as 130,500 male and 11,000 female players.

== Composition ==
The CAB is composed of 24 Provincial Federations, as well as the "Asociación de Clubes de Básquetbol" which organises the first and second division league championships. On the other hand, the CAB itself organises the third division of club basketball, "Liga Federal de Básquetbol". The body also organises women's championship as "Liga Federal Femenina de Básquetbol".

In youth divisions, the CAB organises U19, U17 and other youth championships, including a female tournament.

Unlike men's basketball, the women's division consists of only one national federation.

== See also ==
- Basketball in Argentina
