= Ryan Perryman =

American basketball player (born 1977)

Personal information
- Born: April 13, 1976 (age 50) Oak Park, Michigan, U.S.
- Listed height: 6 ft 7 in (2.01 m)
- Listed weight: 228 lb (103 kg)

Career information
- High school: Oak Park (Oak Park, Michigan)
- College: Dayton (1994–1998)
- NBA draft: 1998: undrafted
- Playing career: 1999–2008
- Position: Power forward

Career highlights
- 2× Liga Nacional de Básquet rebounding leader (2001, 2005); NCAA rebounding leader (1998); First-team All-Atlantic 10 (1998)

Ryan Perryman (born April 13, 1976) is an American former expatriate basketball player who spent time playing professionally in Hungary, South Korea, Chile, the Dominican Republic and Argentina. He is best remembered, however, for his collegiate career at the University of Dayton between 1994–95 and 1997–98. Perryman played for the Flyers after attending Oak Park High School in Oak Park, Michigan. During his four-year career, the 6 ft 7 in (2.01 m), 228-pound power forward compiled 1,524 points and 1,156 rebounds. As a senior in 1997–98, Perryman led NCAA Division I in rebounding with a 12.5 per game average. He holds the school records for rebounds in a game (23) and offensive rebounds in a season (166).

Perryman did not get selected in the NBA draft but had tryouts with the Milwaukee Bucks and Sacramento Kings. Perryman came out of college in 1998, the year of the NBA lockout so tryouts with teams were cut short. He then went on to spend his first year out of college as a teacher in Michigan before becoming a professional basketball player. He had the most success while playing for Argentino de Junín in Buenos Aires. He led the Argentine league in rebounding every single season he was there and even developed a cult following among the team's fans. He also played briefly in the Continental Basketball Association for the Grand Rapids Hoops during the 1998–99 season, averaging 3 points and 5 rebounds per game in limited action.

Today he is an executive manager for IXL Learning. He lives in Columbus, Ohio, and is married with three children.

== See also ==
- List of NCAA Division I men's basketball season rebounding leaders
