= Juan Pablo Vaulet =

Argentine basketball player (born 1996)

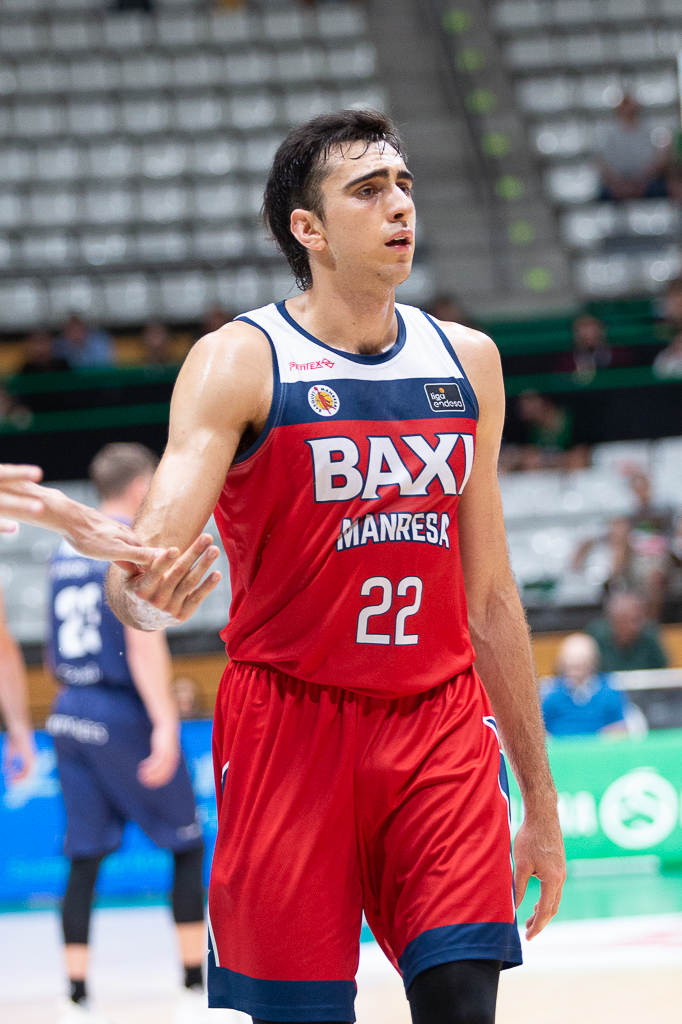
- Vaulet in action with Manresa.

No. 22 – CB Estudiantes
- Position: Small forward
- League: Primera FEB

Personal information
- Born: March 22, 1996 (age 30) Córdoba, Argentina
- Listed height: 6 ft 8 in (2.03 m)
- Listed weight: 227 lb (103 kg)

Career information
- NBA draft: 2015: 2nd round, 39th overall pick
- Drafted by: Charlotte Hornets
- Playing career: 2014–present

Career history
- 2014–2018: Bahía Basket
- 2018–2019: Club Atlético Peñarol
- 2019–2021: Manresa
- 2021: AEK Athens
- 2021–2024: Baxi Manresa
- 2024–2025: Zunder Palencia
- 2025–present: Estudiantes
- Stats at Basketball Reference
Medals
Men's basketball
Representing Argentina
FIBA AmeriCup
Gold medal – first place	2022 Brazil
Silver medal – second place	2025 Managua

Juan Pablo Vaulet, or simply Juan Vaulet (born March 22, 1996) is an Argentine professional basketball player for Movistar Estudiantes of the Primera FEB.

== Professional career ==
As a junior, Vaulet played for such clubs as Parque Vélez Sarsfield, Unión Eléctrica, General Paz Juniors and Hindú Club.

In 2014, Vaulet began his professional career, signing with Weber Bahía Estudiantes of the Liga Nacional de Básquet. He averaged 7.2 points and 4.1 rebounds in 34 games in his rookie season. Manu Ginobili's brother, Sebastián, was the coach of the team.

On July 18, 2019, Vaulet signed a two-year with Spanish club Baxi Manresa.

On July 6, 2021, it was announced that Vaulet would be joining Greek club AEK Athens of the Basketball Champions League after the Tokyo Olympic Games basketball tournament. On August 21, 2021, the transfer officially materialized in a two-year deal. His contract with AEK Athens was mutually terminated on December 20, 2021.

On December 21, 2021, he has signed with Baxi Manresa of the Spanish Liga ACB.

On July 30, 2024, Vaulet signed with Zunder Palencia of the Primera FEB.

=== NBA rights ===
Vaulet entered the 2015 NBA draft as its youngest international early entrant to remain eligible on draft day. On June 25, 2015, he was drafted with the 39th overall pick by the Charlotte Hornets, who later traded his draft rights to the Brooklyn Nets in exchange for two future second-round picks and cash considerations.

On October 6, 2021, Vaulet's draft rights were traded to the Indiana Pacers in exchange for Edmond Sumner and a 2025 second-round pick. On February 9, 2023, his rights were returned to the Brooklyn Nets as part of the multi-team trade featuring Kevin Durant. On July 6, 2024, his rights were traded to the New York Knicks.

== National team career ==
Vaulet has been a starter for the Argentina national team at multiple junior FIBA competitions.

In 2022, Vaulet won the gold medal with the senior team in the 2022 FIBA AmeriCup held in Recife, Brazil. He was one of Argentina's small forwards in the tournament.
