= Campeonato Argentino de Básquet =

Basketball competition in Argentina

- First season: 1928; 97 years ago
- Country: Argentina
- Number of teams: 12
- Level on pyramid: First Division
- Current champions: Córdoba (2018)
- Most championships: Capital Federal (19)

The Campeonato Argentino de Básquet ("Argentine Basketball Championship" in English) is the oldest basketball competition still running in Argentina. The first edition of the tournament was held in 1928, having been played (with some interruptions) to present days. The Campeonato Argentino is played by teams representing Argentine's provincial sides.

Due to being contested by provinces all over Argentina, his competition has been called "The most Argentine championship of all".

== History ==
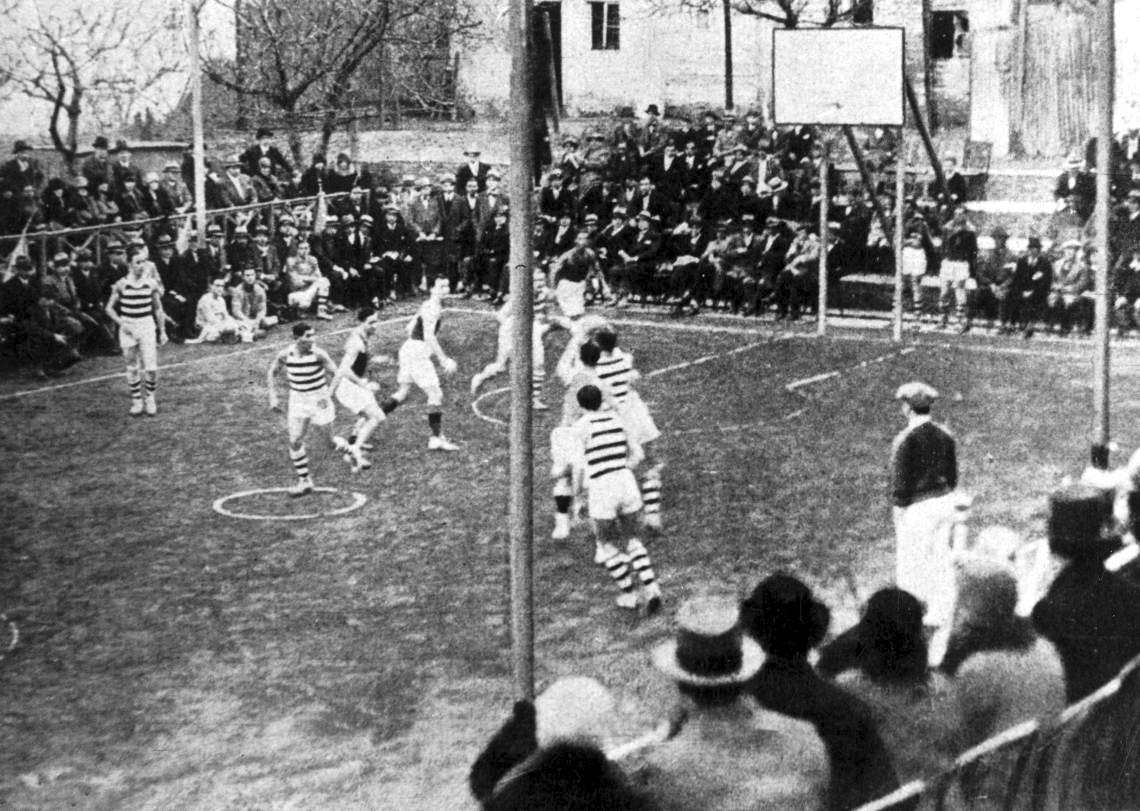
The first game of the inaugural season, Santa Fe v. Córdoba at YMCA, 1928

The first edition of Campeonato Argentino was held in the clay court field of YMCA of Buenos Aires. Santa Fe, Córdoba and two teams from FABB took part of the tournament. Córdoba was the first team outside Buenos Aires to win a championship, in 1932 and 1933. Other provincial sides such as Santa Fe (1934-1935) and Santiago del Estero (1937, with Rafael Lledó as notable player) would win their first national titles also.

Buenos Aires Province was the most winning team between 1966 and 1978, with Bahiense players Alberto Pedro Cabrera, Atilio Fruet and José De Lizaso, plus other players from La Plata, Gehrmann, Galliadi, Sfeir, Carlos González. Buenos Aires played 13 consecutive finals, winning 10 of them.

== Champions ==
Year	Champion
1928	Cap Federal
1929	Buenos Aires
1930	Capital Federal
1931	Capital Federal
1932	Córdoba
1933	Córdoba
1934	(Not held)
1935	Santa Fe
1936	Santa Fe
1937	Santiago del Estero
1938	(Not held)
1939	Capital Fed
1940	Santa Fe
1941	Capital Fed
1942	Santa Fe
1943	Santa Fe
1944	Santa Fe
1945	Santa Fe
1946	(Not held)
1947	Capital Fed
1948	Santiago del Estero
1949	Santa Fe
1950	(Not held)
1951	(Not held)
1952	(Not held)
1953	Cap Federal
1954	Córdoba
1955	Tucumán
1956	(Not held)
1957	Buenos Aires
1958	Cap Federal
1959	Mendoza
1960	Santa Fe
1961	Córdoba
1962	Santiago del Estero
1963	Córdoba
1964	Cap Federal
1965	Santiago del Estero
1966	Buenos Aires
1967	Buenos Aires
1968	Santiago del Estero
1969	Buenos Aires
1970	Buenos Aires
1971	Buenos Aires
1972	Buenos Aires
1973	Buenos Aires
1974	Buenos Aires
1975	Cap Federal
1976	Buenos Aires
1977	Santa Fe
1978	Buenos Aires
1979	Cap Federal
1980	Cap Federal
1981	Buenos Aires
1982	Cap Federal
1983	Cap Federal
1984	Cap Federal
1985	Cap Federal
1986	Buenos Aires
1987	Córdoba
1988	Córdoba
1989	Entre Ríos
1990	(Not held)
1991	Santiago del Estero
1992	San Luis
1993	Tucumán
1994	Cap Federal
1995	Neuquén
1996	Chaco
1997	Santa Fe
1998	Tucumán
1999	Entre Ríos
2000	Córdoba
2001	Córdoba
2002	Entre Ríos
2003	Entre Ríos
2004	Santa Fe
2005	Entre Ríos
2006	Cap Federal
2007	Santa Fe
2008	Entre Ríos
2009	Córdoba
2010	Córdoba
2011	Santiago del Estero
2012	Chaco
2013	Entre Ríos
2014	Corrientes
2015	Tucumán
2016	Tucumán
2017	Neuquén
2018	Córdoba

== Titles by team ==
Team	N° titles
Capital Federal	19
Buenos Aires	14
Santa Fe	13
Córdoba	12
Entre Ríos	7
Santiago del Estero	6
Tucumán	6
Neuquén	2
Chaco	2
Corrientes	1
San Luis	1
Mendoza	1
