= Justin Williams (basketball) =

American basketball player (born 1984)

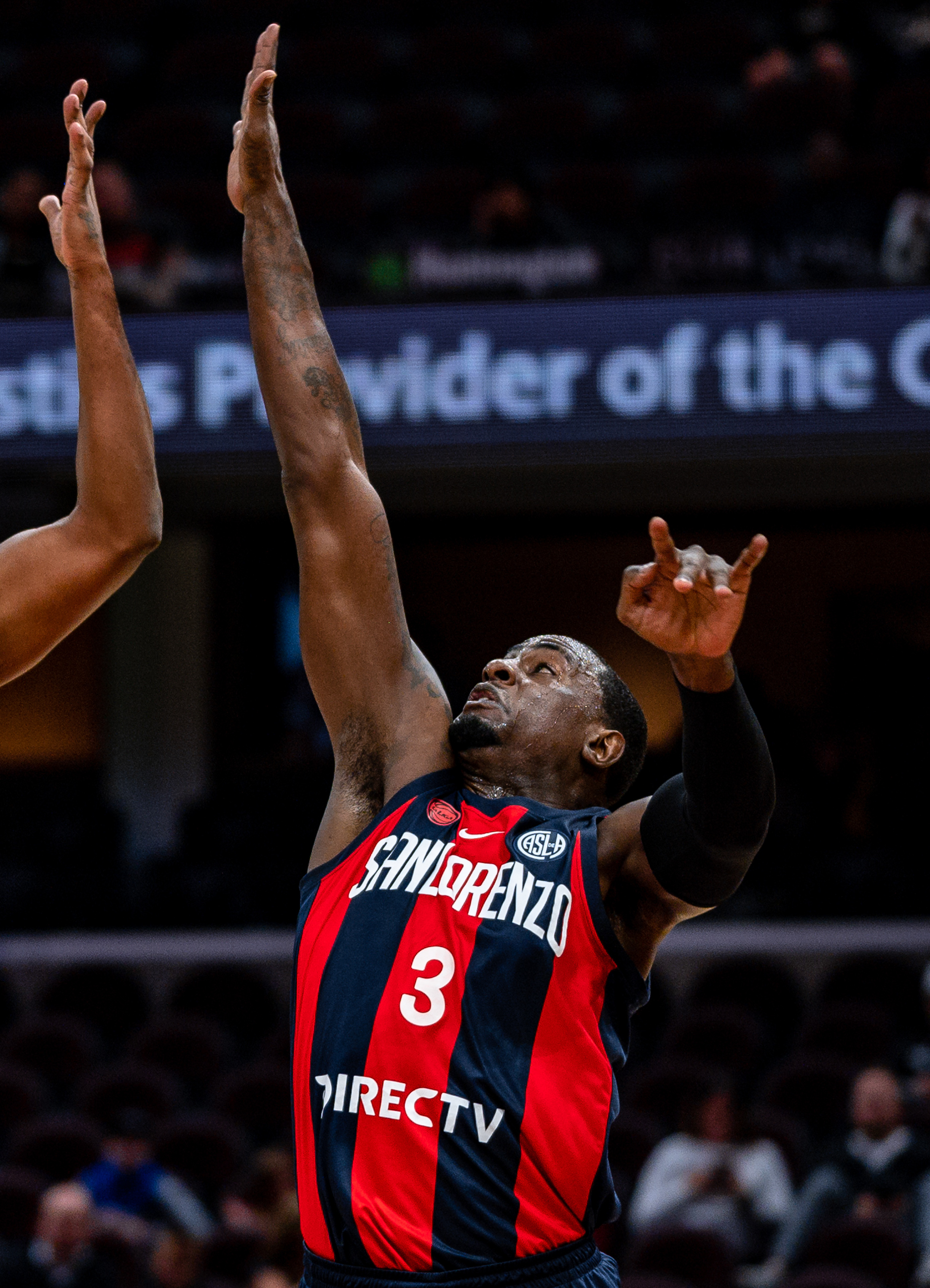
- Williams with San Lorenzo de Almagro in 2019

Personal information
- Born: May 12, 1984 (age 42) Chicago, Illinois, U.S.
- Listed height: 6 ft 10 in (2.08 m)
- Listed weight: 260 lb (118 kg)

Career information
- High school: Thornwood (South Holland, Illinois)
- College: Colby CC (2002–2004); Wyoming (2004–2006)
- NBA draft: 2006: undrafted
- Playing career: 2006–2021
- Position: Power forward / center
- Number: 30

Career history
- 2006–2007: Dakota Wizards
- 2007–2008: Sacramento Kings
- 2008: Houston Rockets
- 2012: Los Angeles D-Fenders
- 2013: GlobalPort Batang Pier
- 2013: San Miguel Beermen
- 2014–2015: Saigon Heat
- 2015–2018: Ciclista Olímpico
- 2018–2019: Guaros de Lara
- 2019–2020: San Lorenzo
- 2021: Titanes de Barranquilla

Career highlights
- ABL champion (2013); ABL Defensive Player of the Year (2014); Argentine League MVP (2016); 2× Liga Nacional de Básquet rebounding leader (2016, 2017); BCL Americas blocks leader (2021)
- Stats at NBA.com
- Stats at Basketball Reference

Justin Williams (born May 12, 1984) is an American former professional basketball player. He is a 6 ft 10 in (2.08 m), 260 pounds (120 kg) power forward-center.

== High school ==
Born in Chicago, Illinois, Williams attended Thornwood High School, in South Holland, Illinois, where he played high school basketball.

== College career ==
Williams played college basketball the Colby Community College, from 2002 to 2004, and at the University of Wyoming, with the Wyoming Cowboys, from 2004 to 2006.

== Professional career ==
Williams went undrafted by an NBA team and started to play with the NBA Development League's Dakota Wizards, averaging 12.1 points, 12.3 rebounds and 3.08 blocks in 12 games. He was signed by the Sacramento Kings to a first 10-day contract on January 5, 2007. After the Kings released power forward Maurice Taylor on January 23, Williams was signed for the rest of season after his two 10-day contracts expired.

On February 16, 2008, Williams was waived by Sacramento together with teammate Dahntay Jones to make room for a trade that sent the Kings' veteran point guard Mike Bibby to the Atlanta Hawks. On March 7, he was signed by the Houston Rockets to a 10-day contract. He played in one game for the Rockets.

Williams was brought to Golden State Warriors training camp on September 27, 2008, but he was cut after appearing in two pre-season games.

On October 16, 2008, Williams was signed by the Charlotte Bobcats. But six days later, he was waived again after failing to impress in three pre-season games.

In 2012, Williams signed with the Los Angeles D-Fenders of the NBA D-League. He played in one game for the D-Fenders recording just one foul in two minutes of play.

In 2013, he was signed as an import for GlobalPort Batang Pier in the Philippines. He was replaced midseason by Walter Sharpe. He later joined the San Miguel Beermen.

=== Argentine League ===
Williams joined Ciclista Olímpico for the 2015 Argentine league Liga Nacional de Básquet.

=== Titanes de Barranquilla (2021) ===
In 2021, Williams played for the Colombian team Titanes de Barranquilla in the 2021 BCL Americas season. He led the league in blocks with 2.8 blocks per game.

== Player profile ==
Williams is best known for his shot-blocking and rebounding abilities. While playing for the University of Wyoming in the 2006 Mountain West Conference Tournament on March 11, he recorded a triple-double in a second-round game against the University of Utah with 10 points, 15 rebounds, and 12 blocked shots. In 2015, Williams lead the Argentine league in rebounds (11.2) and blocks (3.9).

== Sexual assault case ==
On October 17, 2007, Sacramento police searched Williams' home in a northern Sacramento neighborhood. The following day, at a press conference, a police spokesman indicated that they were conducting an ongoing sexual assault investigation, resulting from a young woman's appearance at a local hospital.

Williams, who was traveling with the Sacramento Kings for an exhibition game in Albuquerque, New Mexico, was put on a leave of absence and sent home in order to hire legal counsel. On November 13, 2007, Sacramento District Attorney Jan Scully concluded that Williams would not be charged for anything due to evidence not supporting the filing of any criminal charges in the case.

== Awards and accomplishments ==
=== Club ===
GlobalPort Batang Pier

- ASEAN Basketball League: (2013)

=== Individual ===
- BCL Americas blocks leader: (2021)
- 2× Liga Nacional de Básquet rebounding leader: (2016, 2017)
- Argentine League MVP: (2016)
- ABL Defensive Player of the Year: (2014)
