= Joe Bunn =

American basketball player (born 1975)

Personal information
- Born: May 18, 1975 (age 51)
- Listed height: 6 ft 6 in (1.98 m)
- Listed weight: 232 lb (105 kg)

Career information
- Playing career: 1998–2013
- Position: Power forward / center

Career highlights
- 5× Argentine League Top Scorer (2001, 2002, 2004, 2006, 2011)

Joseph Ray Bunn Stallins (born May 18, 1975) is an American former professional basketball player. At 6'6" tall and 232 lbs. (105 kg) in weight, he played at the power forward and center positions.

== Professional career ==
Bunn played college ball at the North Carolina A & T University (1994–95) where he was named MEAC Rookie of the Year. From there, he transferred to the Old Dominion University (1995–96) and Phillips University (1997–98) in the NAIA.

He was signed for the 1998–99 season by the Lucentum Alicante in the Spanish LEB league. The following season, he played for Lleida, still in the LEB and then moved to Argentina in 2000–2001 and signed with Penarol Mar Del Plata.

Bunn was the Argentine top-tier level Liga Nacional de Básquet (LNB)'s Top Scorer five times (2001, 2002, 2004, 2006, 2011).

== Playing career ==
- 1994/95 (United States) North Carolina A&T Aggies
- 1995/96 (United States) Old Dominion Monarchs
- 1997/98 (United States) Phillips University
- 1998/99 (Spain) Lucentum Alicante
- 1999/00 (Spain) Caprabo Lleida
- 2000/01 (Argentina) Peñarol
- 2000/01 (Venezuela) Gaiteros
- 2000/01 (Dominican Republic) Metropolitanos
- 2000/01 (Puerto Rico) Indios
- 2001/02 (Argentina) Atenas
- 2001/02 (Philippines) Red Bull Thunder
- 2001/02 (Venezuela) Toros
- 2002/03 (Spain) Cantabria Baloncesto
- 2002/03 (Dominican Republic) Metropolitanos
- 2002/03 (Puerto Rico) Capitanes
- 2002/03 (Puerto Rico) Toritos
- 2003/04 (Argentina) Peñarol
- 2004/05 (South Korea) Anyang Stars
- 2004/05 (Puerto Rico) Gallitos
- 2004/05 (Venezuela) Guaiqueries
- 2005/06 (Argentina) Peñarol
- 2006/07 (Italy) Viola Reggio Calabria
- 2006/07 (Puerto Rico) Maratonistas de Coamo
- 2007/08 (France) BCM Gravelines
- 2008/09 (Italy) Andrea Costa Imola
- 2009/10 (Argentina) San Martín de Marcos Juárez
- 2009/11 (Argentina) Argentino de Junín
- 2011/13 (Mexico) Fuerza Guinda de Nogales
- 2013 (Argentina) Estudiantes de Concordia
- 2013 (Argentina) Tomás de Rocamora
