= Gimnasia y Esgrima y Pedernera Unidos =

Gimnasia y Esgrima y Pedernera Unidos (GEPU)
- Nickname: Lobo
- Leagues: LNB
- Founded: 1925; 100 years ago
- Arena: Emilio Perazzo
- Capacity: 2,000
- Location: San Luis, Argentina
- Team colors: Black, Yellow, White
- Head coach: José Franzi
| Home | Away |

Club Gimnasia y Esgrima y Pedernera Unidos (mostly known for its acronym GEPU) is a sports club from San Luis, Argentina. Established in 1925, basketball has been the most notable sport of the club, which senior team competed at the Liga Nacional, the top division of Argentine basketball league system, in the 1990s, winning two titles.

Nowadays the basketball team competes at Torneo Federal, the third division of Argentine basketball.

Other sports practised at GEPU are basque pelota, football, gymnastics, table tennis, tennis and volleyball.

== History ==
The club was founded as "Club Gimnasia y Esgrima" on June 28, 1925, by a group of friends led by Emilio Perazzo (who would be the first president of the institution). As its name indicated, fencing was the main sport of the club, with teacher Raúl Ruffa being part of the Argentine Olympic team at the 1936 games.

During the 1940s, the basketball team of Club Olimpia moved to Gimnasia y Esgrima, adding this sport to the club. In 1979, another institution of San Luis that focused on football and cycling, Club Pedernera, merged to GyE, therefore the club was renamed as "Gimnasia y Esgrima Pedernera Unidos". From then on, the inhabitants of San Luis familiarly referred to the club as "GEPU". The club added sports sections by then, such as gymnastics, tennis, basque pelota, paddle and swimming.

In 1989 the basketball team promoted to Liga Nacional, second to Gimnasia y Esgrima de Comodoro Rivadavia. In 1994 the team left the LNB after being eliminated at quarterfinals.

GEPU won its first LNB title in 1990–91 season, being coached by Daniel Rodríguez. Héctor Campana was elected MVP of both, regular season and finals, totalizing 1,448 points in 46 games (with an average of 31,5 per game and achieving the 3rd best scoring ever at the national league.

The team played the finals against Estudiantes de Bahía Blanca by 4–2.

In the next season, GEPU reached the finals again but the team was defeated at the hands of Atenas de Córdoba by 4–2, with Campana (now playing for Atenas) being named MVP for a second consecutive term.

GEPU won its second title in 1992–93, taking revenge on Atenas for the previous defeat. GEPU won the series by 4–2, with Juan Espil being named MVP of both, season and finals. Espil was also the topscorer with an average of 28,8 points per game (totalizing 1,672 in 58 matches), the second in the LNB history.

== Notable players ==
Note: Flags indicate national team eligibility at FIBA-sanctioned events. Players may hold other non-FIBA nationalities not displayed.

Criteria

To appear in this section a player must have either:

- Set a club record or won an individual award while at the club
- Played at least one official international match for their national team at any time
- Played at least one official NBA match at any time.

- Héctor Campana
- Hernán Montenegro
- Carlos Romano
- Juan Espil
- Diego Maggi
- Esteban Pérez

== Honors ==
- Liga Nacional (2):
  - 1990–91, 1992–93
