= Estudiantes de Bahía Blanca =

Estudiantes (Bahía Blanca)
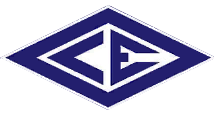
- Nickname: Albo (White)
- Leagues: Asociación Bahiense de Básquetbol
- Founded: 21 March 1918; 108 years ago
- Arena: Estadio Osvaldo Casanova
- Capacity: 5,000
- Location: Bahía Blanca, Buenos Aires Province, Argentina
- Team colors
- President: Federico Hiebaum
- Head coach: Ariel Ugolini
- Website: https://clubestudiantesbb.com/
Home	Away

Club Estudiantes de Bahía Blanca is an Argentine sports club based in Bahía Blanca, Buenos Aires Province. The club is best known for its basketball team, that currently played in the main levels of Argentina, including Campeonato Argentino and Liga Nacional de Básquet (LNB). Estudiantes is nicknamed Albo (in English: "White") for the traditional white color of its uniform. The team currently competes in "Asociación Bahiense", the regional league of Bahía Blanca.

Manu Ginóbili (notable former player of NBA's San Antonio Spurs) played for Estudiantes prior to moving to the Italian league in 1998.

Apart from basketball, other activities at the club are gymnastics, handball, judo, karate, volleyball and yoga.

== History ==
=== Beginning and consolidation ===
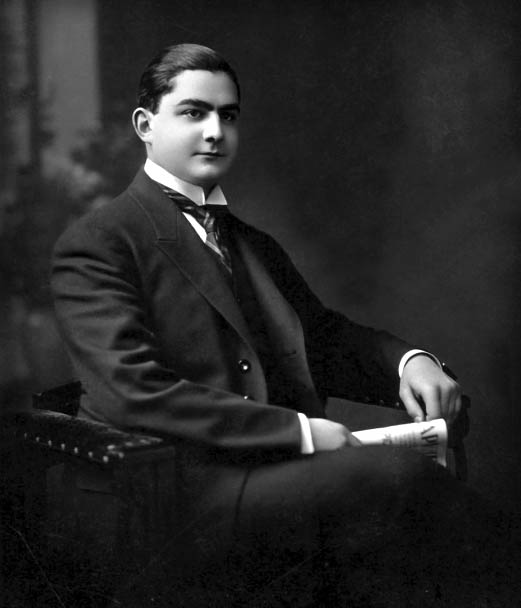
Haroldo Casanova, first president of the club

By 1908, a considerable amount of European immigrants arrived in the port of Bahía Blanca. Football in the city was introduced by those immigrants, as an exclusive game practised by the British executives at the beginning but then spreading to mass classes. That same year, a group of students ("Estudiantes" in Spanish) of local school met to compete in the Liga del Sur, a regional football competition. They formed a team, which took part in those leagues, although the team would be dissolved soon after.

In 1912, the Sáenz Peña Law had been promulgated by the Argentine National Congress which established the universal, secret and compulsory male suffrage. That event influenced students, who claimed for a reform in the education system, more specifically in the University of the city. As a result, in 1917 a group of students formed a committee, presided by Haroldo Casanova of 18 years old. It was named "Centro de Estudiantes Secundarios de Bahía Blanca".

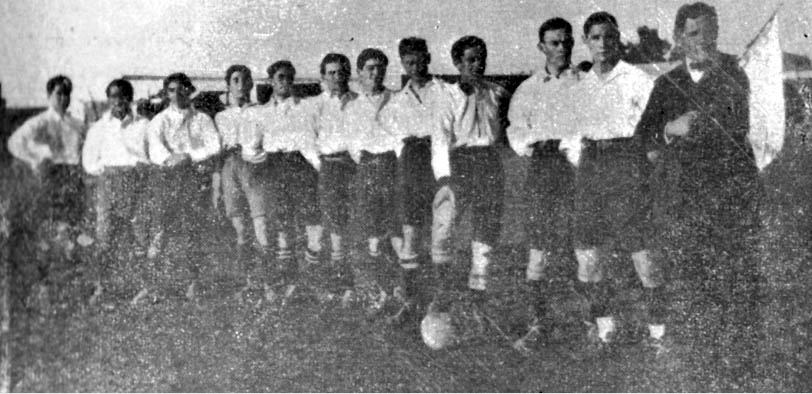
Football team of the club, 1918 champions

One year after, the student center had facilities located on Parque de Mayo, close to the railway line, for the practical of several sports while the administrative office set in the "Sociedad Laurak Bat", a social club established by the Basque community. The original statute specified that candidates should be students to become members of the club, although this clause would be amended later.

By 1920 Estudiantes had teams competing in football and basketball, playing in provisories venues so they did not have one. Some of those venues were Club Porteño and Correos y Telégrafos. Nevertheless, the club got an own venue in Parque de Mayo, after arrangements made by club executives. British firm Hardcastle gave wooden goods to build sports clothing. Ten years after, the club had a venue with grandstands, a running track and football and basketball fields.

=== Basketball ===
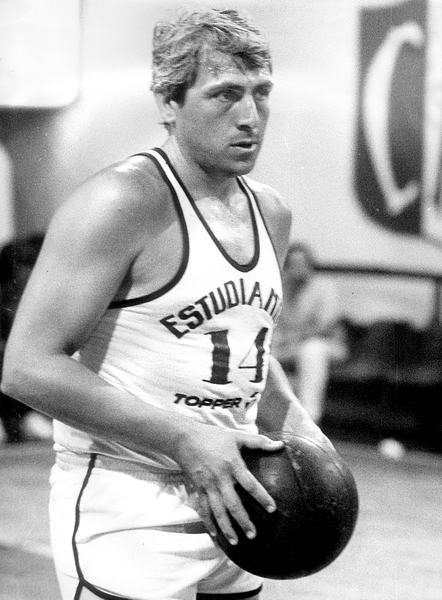
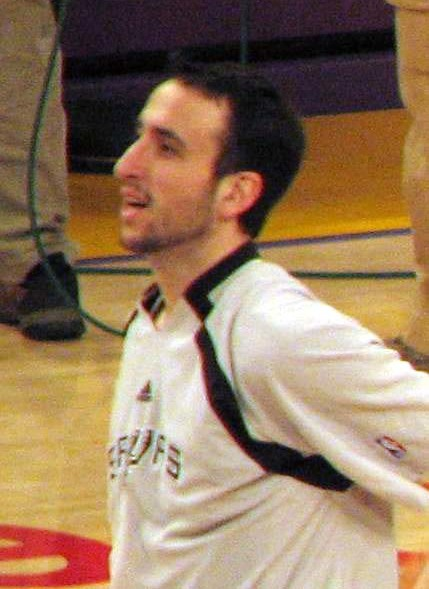
Beto Cabrera (left) had been regarded as Estudiantes' best player ever until the huge success of Manu Ginóbili (right) Cabrera stayed more than 23 years for the club, with his #14 being retired by Estudiantes. On the other side, Ginóbili only played two years before being traded to Viola Reggio Calabria in 1998

With the consolidation of basketball in Argentina, Estudiantes would play a long tenure in the main club competition of the country, the Campeonato Argentino, established in 1936. Until then, there was only a tournament where provincial sides took part, as a part of local leagues, such as the Torneo Metropolitano, for teams of Buenos Aires. Although the club did not win any title, Estudiantes reached the finals in 1975, losing to Obras Sanitarias.

Estudiantes began participating in the first Liga Nacional de Básquet championship in 1985, finishing 4th. Its best performance was in the 1990–91, when the team finished as runner-up after being beat by then champion GEPU in the finals.

In the 2002–03 season Estudiantes was relegated to Torneo Nacional de Ascenso (second division), after a poor campaign that include 29 defeats and only 7 wins. Estudiantes played a playoff relegation vs Ferro Carril Oeste, losing its place in the top division.

After some irregular campaigns in the second level, the club acquired a vacant position to River Plate, therefore returning to LNB.

At the end of the 2007–08 season, the club had to struggle with severe economic problems, as a result Estudiantes sold its vacancy. Nevertheless, the apparition of some sponsors allowed the team to remain in LNB. Prior to the 2008–09 season, and inspired on the Monte Hermoso Básquetbol case (where Club El Nacional associated with the Municipality of Monte Hermoso to keep its position in the league), Estudiantes changed its name to "Bahía Blanca Estudiantes".

In the 2010–11 season Estudiantes changed its name to "Weber Bahía Estudiantes" for sponsorship reasons. Before the 2013–14 championship started, Estudiantes leave its vacancy to Bahía Basket, a project of former player Pepe Sánchez to keep a team from Bahía Blanca in the top division. Therefore Estudiantes left the LNB, competing in the "Asociación Bahiense de Básquetbol" (Bahía Blanca Basketball Association) since then.

== Players ==
=== Notable players ===
Note: Flags indicate national team eligibility at FIBA-sanctioned events. Players may hold other non-FIBA nationalities not displayed.

Criteria

To appear in this section a player must have either:

- Set a club record or won an individual award while at the club
- Played at least one official international match for their national team at any time
- Played at least one official NBA match at any time.

- (Argentina) Alberto Cabrera (1961–84)
- (Argentina) Raúl P. Álvarez
- (Argentina) José Luis Gil (?–1995)
- (Argentina) Jorge Faggiano (1983, 1985–88, 1991–94, 1996–97)
- (Argentina) Hernán Montenegro (1990–91, 1995–96, 1999–2000)
- (Argentina) Juan Espil (1988–92)
- (Argentina) Juan Ignacio Sánchez (1995–96)
- (Argentina) Manu Ginóbili (1996–98)
- (Uruguay) Fefo Ruiz (1985–1987)
- (United States) Ed Nelson (2008–09)

=== Retired numbers ===
Estudiantes' retired numbers
N°	Nat.	Player	Position	Tenure	Date of retirement
5	(Argentina)	Hernán Jasen	SF	1996–99	2018
10	(Argentina)	Juan Espil	SG	1988–1992	22 February 2013
14	(Argentina)	Alberto Cabrera	PG	1961–1984	3 October 2004
