= León Najnudel =

Argentine basketball player and coach

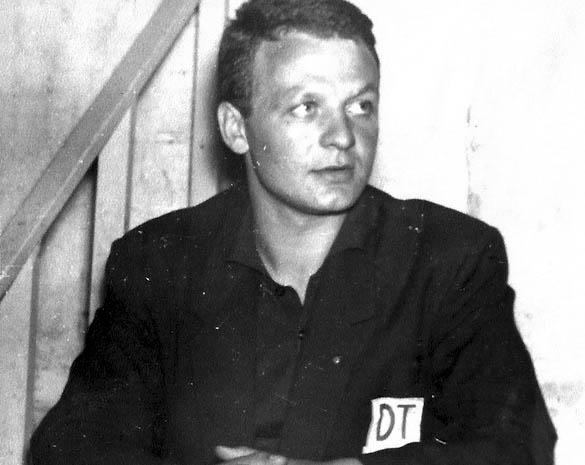

Personal information
- Born: 14 July 1941
- Died: April 22, 1998 (aged 56)
- Coaching career: 1963–1996

Career history
- 1963: Atlanta
- 1976–82: Ferro Carril Oeste
- 1983–84: CB Zaragoza
- 1985: Argentina national team
- 1986–88: SC Cañadense
- 1988–90: Ferro Carril Oeste
- 1991: Deportivo San Andrés
- 1992–93: Gimnasia y Esgrima (CR)
- 1994–95: Boca Juniors
- 1995: Racing
- 1996: Ferro Carril Oeste

León David Najnudel (14 July 1941 – 22 April 1998) was an Argentine professional basketball player and basketball coach, and the main driving force in the creation of the Liga Nacional de Básquet, the first nationwide yearly professional basketball league in Argentina.

Najnudel is considered the most prominent figure in the history of basketball in Argentina, and also named "the father of Argentine basketball".

He coached several teams along his career, including the Argentina national team

== Biography ==
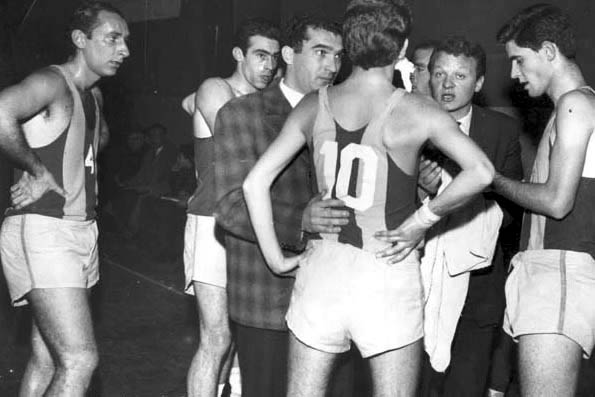
Najnudel (2nd. from right) as coach of C.A. Atlanta

Najnudel had a strong passion for basketball since his early age. He played in Villa Crespo, Victoria, Barracas Juniors and Atlanta. He started his coaching career at the Atlanta's children and youth divisions, when the club was presided by León Kolbowski, one of the most prominent executives in its history.

When Atlanta fired its basketball senior coach Jaime Pérez in 1963, Kolbowski asked Najnudel (who was only 21 by then) to take over the team. Under his guidance, Atlanta made a great campaign and promoted to Primera División after defeating Deportivo Español in the final. Najnudel continued coaching Atlanta until 1971.

In 1969 Najnudel was hired by the Basketball Association of Junín to coach the local team at the provincial championship. He also coached Santiago del Estero team in the 1970 Argentine Championship in Catamarca.

In 1976 Najnudel was hired as coach of Ferro Carril Oeste, where he won the Campeonato Sudamericano de Clubes in 1981 and 1982. During those years, Najnudel forged a relationship with Ferro's football coach Carlos Griguol, who used to visit him at the training sessions to adapt Najnudel's tactic moves to the football team, which would win the 1982 and 1984 Primera División titles, the only senior titles for the club to date.

Najnudel, along coaches José María Cavallero and Horacio Seguí, as well as journalist Osvaldo Ricardo Orcasitas (nicknamed ORO), were the main proponents of the creation of the Liga Nacional de Básquet. Sports magazine El Gráfico gave a strong support to the initiative. The goal was finally achieved on 26 April 1985, when the first game of the league was played.

The new nationwide league allowed basketball to grow in cities other than Buenos Aires, like in Bahía Blanca and Córdoba, that became important basketball centers.

“I always understood that our players were spread too thin across the country and were unable to compete among and against the best. There wasn't a need to allow for their development, as there wasn't a stable, unique, attractive, and national-scale championship that covered the entire eight months of the season

— Najnudel on El Gráfico

In 1985 Najnudel became coach of the Argentina national team, qualifying for the 1986 World Cup after finishing 3rd. in the qualification round. It was the return to the top competition after 12 years of absence.

Najnudel's coaching career continued in Sport Club Cañadense (1986-1988), Ferro Carril Oeste (his second run on the team, winning the LNB title in 1989), Deportivo San Andrés (1990–91), Gimnasia y Esgrima de Comodoro Rivadavia (1991–93), Boca Juniors (1993–95), Racing Club (1995–96), and a second return to Ferro C. Oeste (1996–97) to end his career. In Liga Nacional, Najnudel set a record of 241 wins and 207 loses.

After his retirement, Najnudel served as adviser at the Secretariat of Sports of Argentina.

Najnudel died of leukemia in 1998, after one year and a half of battling the disease.

== Coaching career ==
=== Teams ===
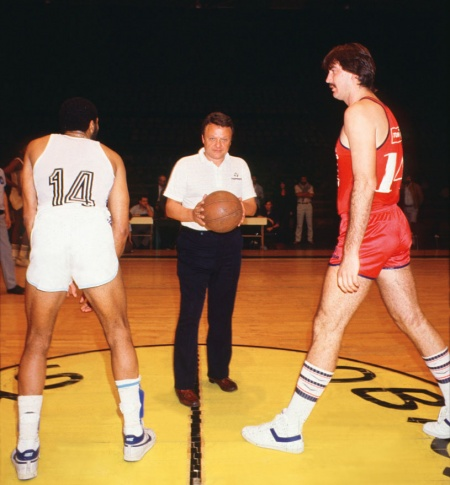
León Najnudel holding the ball before the first LNB match ever, San Lorenzo v. Argentino de Firmat, 1985

Nat.	Team	Tenure	Ref.
(Argentina)	Atlanta	1963–1971	
(Argentina)	Corrientes youth team	1971–1975	
(Argentina)	Ferro Carril Oeste	1976–1982	
(Spain)	CB Zaragoza	1983–1984	
(Argentina)	Argentina national team	1985	
(Argentina)	Sport Club Cañadense	1986–1988	
(Argentina)	Ferro Carril Oeste	1988–1990	
(Argentina)	Deportivo San Andrés	1991	
(Argentina)	Gimnasia y Esgrima (CR)	1992–1993	
(Argentina)	Boca Juniors	1994–1995	
(Argentina)	Racing Club	1995	
(Argentina)	Ferro Carril Oeste	1996	

=== Titles ===
Ferro Carril Oeste

- Campeonato Sudamericano de Clubes: 1981, 1982
- Liga Nacional de Básquet: 1989

CB Zaragoza

- Copa del Rey de Baloncesto: 1983

== Statistics ==
- League games: 448 games with 241 wins and 207 losses (53,80%)
- Regular Series: 388 games with 207 wins and 181 losses (53,35%)
- Post-Season: 60 games with 34 wins and 26 losses (56,66%)
