= Juan Alberto Espil =

Argentine-Italian basketball player

Juan Espil
Personal information
- Born: 5 January 1968 (age 58) Bahía Blanca, Argentina
- Listed height: 1.95 m (6 ft 5 in)
- Listed weight: 90 kg (198 lb)

Career information
- Playing career: 1988–2012
- Position: Shooting guard / small forward
- Number: 10

Career history
- 1988–1992: Estudiantes (BB)
- 1992–1994: GEPU San Luis
- 1994–1996: Atenas
- 1996–2000: TAU Cerámica
- 2000–2001: Adr Roma
- 2001–2003: Joventut Badalona
- 2003–2005: Ricoh Manresa
- 2005–2006: Tenerife
- 2006: Bilbao Berri
- 2006–2008: Ricoh Manresa
- 2008–2009: Boca Juniors
- 2009–2010: Obras Sanitarias
- 2010–2012: Bahía Basket

Career highlights
- Argentine League champion (1993); Argentine League Finals MVP (1993); Argentine League MVP (1993); 3× Argentine League Top Scorer (1993, 1995, 1996); Spanish Cup winner (1999); 3× Liga ACB Free Throw Percentage leader (1998, 2004, 2005); Spanish League 3 Point Shootout Champion (1996–97); Italian Supercup winner (2000); N° 10 jersey retired by Estudiantes (BB) (2013)
Medals
Men's basketball
Representing Argentina
Pan American Games
Gold medal – first place	1995 Mar del Plata
FIBA AmeriCup
Silver medal – second place	1995 Neuquén
Bronze medal – third place	1993 San Juan
Bronze medal – third place	1999 San Juan

Juan Alberto Espil Vanotti (born 5 January 1968) is a retired Argentine-Italian professional basketball player, who played as a shooting guard-small forward.

== Professional career ==
Espil's last pro club was Bahía Basket (successor of Estudiantes in the LNB), where he retired in 2012.

In February 2013, Estudiantes honoured Espil by retiring the #10 jersey that he had worn during his two tenures on the club.

== National team career ==
Espil helped Argentina to claim the country's first ever gold medal in men's basketball at the Pan American Games, as Argentina defeated the Team USA, in the final of the 1995 Pan American Games, in Mar del Plata, Argentina.

Espil also competed with the senior men's Argentine national basketball team at the 1996 Summer Olympics in Atlanta, Georgia, where his team finished in ninth place in the overall standings.
