= Ariel Eslava =

Argentine basketball player

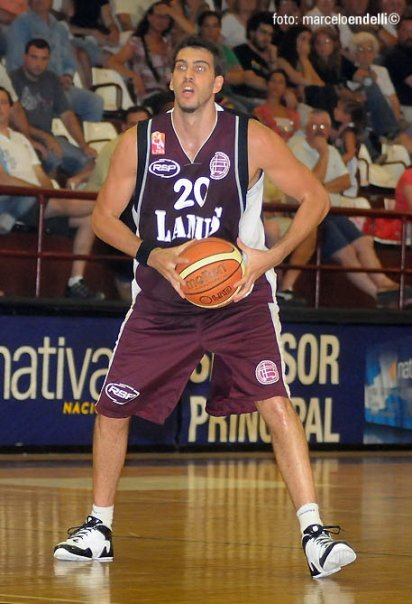

Personal information
- Born: 11 April 1979 (age 47)
- Listed height: 204 cm (6 ft 8 in)
- Listed weight: 98 kg (216 lb)

Career information
- Playing career: 1995–2019
- Position: Forward
Medals
- Liga ACB champion (2000)
- Spanish King's Cup Winner (2009)
- 2× Spanish Super Cup winner (2006, 2008)

Ariel Julio Eslava Steinmetz is an Argentine basketball player. He was born in Buenos Aires and his birthdate is April 11, 1979. He is 2.04 m (6 ft 8 in) in height and 98 kg (216 lb) in weight. He currently plays for Saski Baskonia and previously played for Real Madrid Baloncesto, Boca Juniors, CB Cáceres and Melilla Baloncesto in the LEB. He has not played for the Argentina national basketball team but for the regional team. He holds dual Argentine and Spanish passports. He won the Spanish championship with Real Madrid in 2000 and the Spanish King's Cup in 2009 with TAU Cerámica.
