= Pepe Sánchez (basketball) =

Argentine basketball player (born 1977)

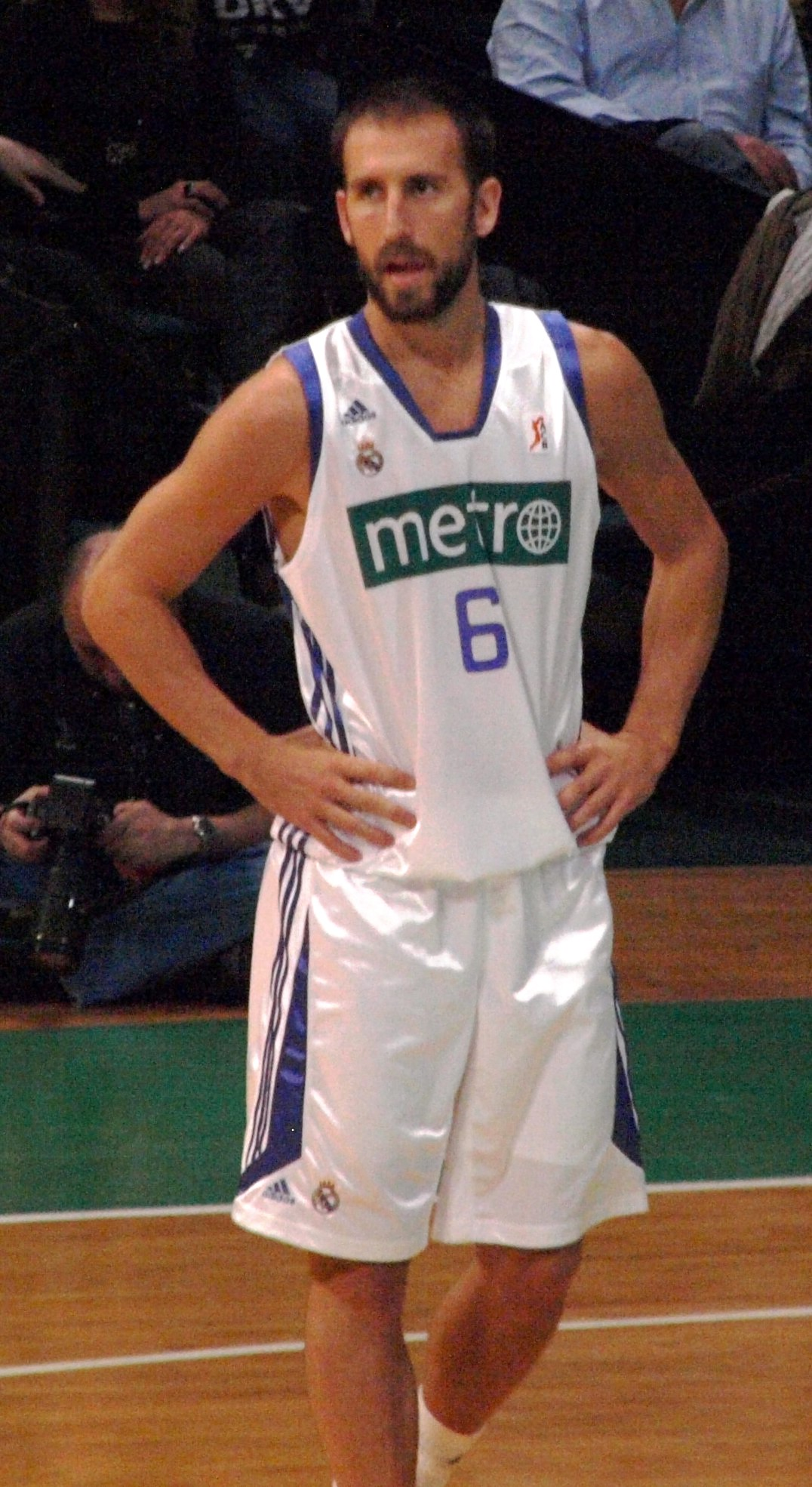
- Sánchez with the Real Madrid in 2008

Personal information
- Born: May 8, 1977 (age 49) Bahía Blanca, Argentina
- Listed height: 6 ft 4 in (1.93 m)
- Listed weight: 194 lb (88 kg)

Career information
- College: Temple (1996–2000)
- NBA draft: 2000: undrafted
- Playing career: 1994–2013
- Position: Point guard
- Number: 24, 4, 6

Career history
- 1994–1995: Deportivo Roca
- 1995–1996: Estudiantes de Bahía Blanca
- 2000–2001: Philadelphia 76ers
- 2001: Atlanta Hawks
- 2001: Philadelphia 76ers
- 2001–2002: Panathinaikos
- 2002–2003: Detroit Pistons
- 2003–2004: Etosa Alicante
- 2004–2007: Unicaja Málaga
- 2007–2008: AXA FC Barcelona
- 2008–2009: Real Madrid
- 2010: Obras Sanitarias
- 2010–2013: Weber Bahía Estudiantes

Career highlights
- EuroLeague champion (2002); Spanish League champion (2006); Spanish Cup winner (2005); Third-team All-American – AP, NABC (2000); Atlantic 10 Player of the Year (2000); 2× Robert V. Geasey Trophy (1999, 2000); 2× First-team All-Atlantic 10 (1999, 2000)
- Stats at NBA.com
- Stats at Basketball Reference
Medals
Men's basketball
Representing Argentina
Summer Olympic Games
Gold medal – first place	2004 Athens
FIBA World Cup
Silver medal – second place	2002 Indianapolis
FIBA AmeriCup
Gold medal – first place	2001 Neuquen
Silver medal – second place	2003 San Juan
Gold medal – first place	2011 Mar del Plata
FIBA South American Championship
Silver medal – second place	1999 Bahia Blanca
FIBA Diamond Ball
Bronze medal – third place	2004 Belgrade

Juan Ignacio Sánchez Brown (born May 8, 1977), commonly known as Pepe Sánchez, is an Argentine former professional basketball player. He played at the point guard position. He was a part of Argentina's 2004 Olympic gold medal team and was the first Argentine to play in the NBA. He played two seasons in the NBA, playing in a total of 38 games with the Philadelphia 76ers (24 games), Atlanta Hawks (5 games), and the Detroit Pistons (9 games), averaging only 5 minutes per game.

== Professional career ==
=== Early years ===
At age 12, he began playing for the youth team of Club Bahiense del Norte, together with future NBA star Emanuel Ginóbili. At age 17 he moved to Deportivo Roca for the 1994–95 season of the Argentine League, where he played point guard. The following year, he accepted a scholarship offer from Temple University in Philadelphia, but stayed in Argentina during the 1995–96 season, playing for Estudiantes de Bahía Blanca.

After his participation in the 1996 Youth Panamerican Tournament in Puerto Rico, where he represented the junior national team of Argentina, he moved to Philadelphia where he played for the Temple Owls college team for 4 years under Hall of Fame coach John Chaney, and finished his career as the #2 player in the NCAA in steals (he is currently in fifth place in career steals). As a junior, the crafty point guard guided the Owls to an appearance in the Elite Eight, where they fell to Duke. Despite averaging only 5.6 points per game as a senior, he was named a Third Team All-American by the Associated Press. He earned a degree in history at Temple in 2000.

=== NBA ===
On October 2, 2000, he was signed as an undrafted free agent by the Philadelphia 76ers, after not being selected in the NBA draft. On October 31, 2000, he became the first Argentine to play in a regular season game in the National Basketball Association, firsting countryman Rubén Wolkowyski by a few minutes.

On February 22, 2001, he was traded along with Toni Kukoč, Nazr Mohammed and Theo Ratliff to the Atlanta Hawks, in exchange for Roshown McLeod and Dikembe Mutombo. He was waived on March 12, 2001.

On March 15, 2001, he was signed as a free agent by the Philadelphia 76ers. On October 10, 2002, he signed as a free agent with the Detroit Pistons.

On August 21, 2003, he was traded along with Clifford Robinson to the Golden State Warriors, in exchange for Bob Sura. He was waived on October 31, 2003.

Sánchez played a total of 38 games in his NBA career and recorded a total of 20 points, 21 rebounds, 49 assists and 16 steals. His final game was on April 16, 2003, in a 92–99 loss to the Boston Celtics where he played for 6 minutes and the only stat he recorded was 1 rebound.

=== Europe ===
In Europe, Sánchez won the EuroLeague championship in the 2001–02 season, while playing with the Greek Basket League club Panathinaikos. He also played in the Spanish League with Etosa Alicante. He transferred to the Spanish League club Unicaja Málaga in 2004, with whom he won the 2005–06 ACB League; Unicaja's first Spanish League title. After three years at Unicaja, he left as a free agent when his contract expired at the end of the 2006–07 season. On August 13, 2007, he signed with FC Barcelona.

In July 2008, he signed with Real Madrid, but he was released in April 2009.

== National team career ==
Sánchez was first called up to the senior men's Argentine national basketball team in 1998. With Argentina, he played at the: FIBA World Cup, at both the 1998 FIBA World Championship and the 2002 FIBA World Championship (where he won the silver medal), the 1999 South American Championship (where he won the silver medal), and at the 2004 Summer Olympic Games (where he won the gold medal).

Sánchez's performance at the 2006 FIBA World Championship was quite satisfactory, with the Argentine press choosing him as the most outstanding player of the team.

== Career statistics ==
=== Domestic leagues ===
Season	Team	League	GP	MPG	FG%	3P%	FT%	RPG	APG	SPG	BPG	PPG
2001–02	Panathinaikos	GBL	20	20.9	.420	.188	.690	2.3	4.0	1.7	.0	4.0
2003–04	Etosa Alicante	ACB	21	27.5	.463	.224	.706	3.7	6.3	1.8	.1	7.5
2004–05	Unicaja	ACB	37	20.2	.381	.318	.657	2.7	3.2	1.2	.1	5.0
2005–06	Unicaja	ACB	44	22.5	.569	.372	.846	4.2	3.8	1.3	.0	6.6
2006–07	Unicaja	ACB	44	21.1	.378	.311	.769	2.8	4.6	1.2	.0	4.4
2007–08	FC Barcelona	ACB	41	20.6	.433	.301	.837	3.3	5.0	1.2	.1	4.8
2008–09	Real Madrid	ACB	15	14.5	.167	.067	1.000	1.0	2.9	.8	.0	.7
2009–10	Obras Sanitarias	LNB	7	23.3	.467	.357	.727	2.6	6.3	1.6	.0	5.3
2010–11	Weber Bahía Estudiantes	LNB	43	30.4	.462	.330	.733	5.2	6.9	3.3	.1	10.0
2011–12	Weber Bahía Estudiantes	LNB	45	26.1	.485	.370	.763	5.5	5.5	1.5	.1	10.7
2012–13	Weber Bahía Estudiantes	LNB	26	19.1	.329	.333	.810	2.9	2.8	.8	.0	7.4

== See also ==
- List of NCAA Division I men's basketball career steals leaders
