= Sport Club Cañadense =

Argentine sports club

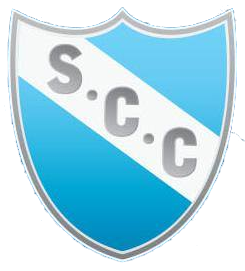
- Full name: Sport Club Cañadense
- Nickname(s): Celeste
- Founded: 5 August 1913; 112 years ago
- Chairman: Guillermo Conejo
- League: Liga Cañadense de Fútbol
- Website: http://www.sportcc.com.ar/
Home colours	Away colours

Sport Club Cañadense is an Argentine sports club from Cañada de Gómez, Santa Fe Province. Although many sports are practised at the club, the institution is mostly known for both its football and basketball teams.

The club's football team plays in the Liga Cañadense de Fútbol, a local tournament which Sport Club won 19 times, becoming the second team with most titles in league history behind Sportivo Las Parejas. The basketball squad plays at La Liga Federal (LFB), the Third division of the Liga Nacional de Básquetbol.

Renowned people such as Gigante Gonzalez, Leon Najnudel, Sergio Hernandez and Daniel Farabello passed through the basketball club, in addition to Hugo Sconochini and Francisco Farabello, Daniel's Son, who emerged from the youth teams of the club

Other sports hosted by Sport Club are field hockey, gymnastics, roller skating, swimming and tennis.
