= Alberto Pedro Cabrera =

Argentine basketball player (1945–2000)

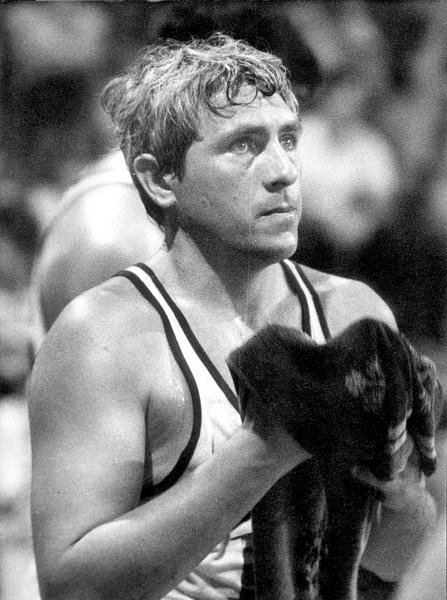
- Cabrera during his run on Estudiantes de Bahía Blanca

Personal information
- Born: December 16, 1945 Bahía Blanca, Argentina
- Died: August 12, 2000 (aged 54)
- Listed height: 6 ft 1 in (1.85 m)

Career information
- Playing career: 1961–1984
- Position: Point guard
- Number: 14

Career history
- 1961–1984: Estudiantes (BB)
- 1976: Gimnasia y Esgrima (LP)

Career highlights
- 1× Campeonato Sudamericano champion; 9× Torneo Argentino champion; 5× Torneo Oficial champion; 12× Torneo Bahiense champion; 12× Torneo Bonaerense champion; 3× Olimpia de Plata awards; N° 14 retired by Estudiantes (BB) (2004)

Alberto Pedro "Beto" Cabrera (December 16, 1945 – August 12, 2000) was an Argentine basketball player. At club level, Cabrera won 17 championships with his former club, Estudiantes de Bahía Blanca and 12 titles playing for the Bahía Blanca City team. He played 8 years for the Argentina national team, also being its captain. He was nicknamed Mago or Mandrake because of his playing skills.

Cabrera had been considered the best Argentine basketball player ever before the huge success achieved by Manu Ginóbili playing in the NBA. Cabrera was also named Sportsman of the 20th Century by his hometown, Bahía Blanca, in 1999. The city is also considered "Capital Nacional del Básquet#" (National Capital City of Basketball) in Argentina due to the popularity of the sport there.

== Basketball career ==
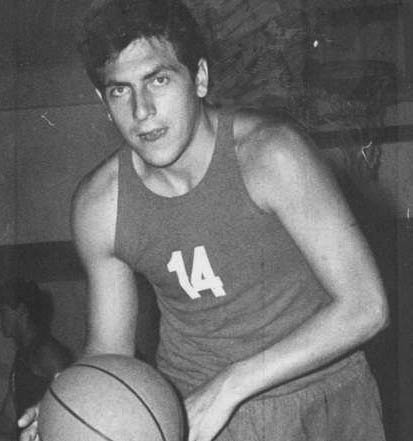
Cabrera during his first years in Estudiantes.

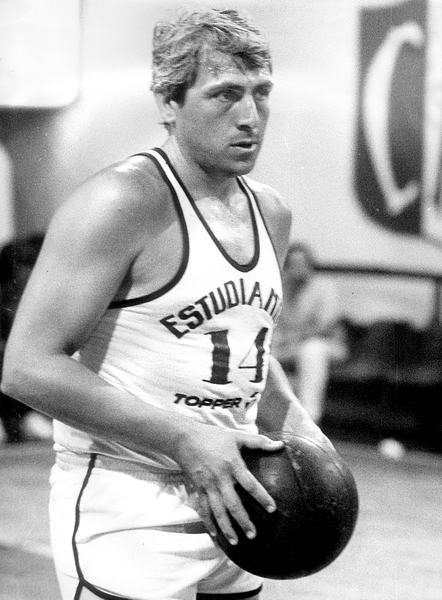
Cabrera at the end of his career.

Cabrera was born on December 16, 1945, in Bahía Blanca and started to play at 7 years old in Estudiantes de Bahía Blanca. Although he had not a stylized physique, his first movements on the field showed that Cabrera was specially skilled to control and pass the ball and he was also able to defend, being an outstanding blocker due to his timing to jump. He was not only a strategist but a great scorer, achieving an average of 28 points in one season. Moreover, his experience after many years of career and his permanent interest in the game made Cabrera deserver of nicknames such as "El Mago" (The Magician, in Spanish).

His debut in Primera División was on November 30, 1961. In 1963 Cabrera won his first title with Estudiantes, defeating 49-42 to Independiente in the final game. He was only 17.

During the 1970s, Estudiantes (led by Cabrera) played some of the most relevant games against arch-rival Olimpo, with Atilio Fruet as its most notable player. Cabrera and Fruet would become rivals inside the court and friends outside.

"We used to say that we were rivals because of being in different teams, but we consider each other a friend. When "Beto" received an award I felt like if I had won the prize and not him. Some people discussed about who was better, Cabrera or me. But I felt flattered due to the fact of being compared with him: he was an exquisite player while I was rather an enthusiastic one. He was an extraordinary basketball player and he will be always remembered as a giant."

— Atilio Fruet

Cabrera also played 8 years for the Argentina national basketball team, with a total of 16 matches disputed. His debut was in the Mundial Extra hosted in Chile in 1966, playing then the 1967 and 1974 FIBA World Championships which took place in Uruguay and Puerto Rico, respectively. His score average was 11,5 points.

On January 16, 1984, Cabrera retired from the activity winning a Torneo Bahiense championship. He died of leukemia on August 12, 2000.

== Honors and awards ==
=== Championships ===
Club

- Estudiantes (BB)
  - Torneo Oficial (5): 1965, 1970, 1974, 1975, 1982, 1983
  - Torneo Bahiense (12): 1962, 1963, 1966, 1967, 1970, 1971, 1972, 1974, 1975, 1980, 1982, 1983

Special teams

- Bahia Blanca city team
  - Torneo Bonaerense (12): 1964, 1965, 1966, 1967, 1968, 1969, 1970, 1971, 1973, 1974, 1975, 1978
- Buenos Aires province team:
  - Torneo Argentino (9): 1966, 1967, 1969, 1970, 1971, 1972, 1973, 1976, 1979

National team

- Argentina
  - Campeonato Sudamericano (1): 1979

=== Awards and recognition ===
- Olimpia de Plata (for basketball player of the year in Argentina): 3 (1970, 1973, 1974)
- "Sportsman of the 20th Century", named by his home town, Bahia Blanca, in 1999
- N° 14 retired by Estudiantes de Bahía Blanca on October 3, 2004
- Total Games played: 724
