= EuroLeague records =

Club level basketball competition

The EuroLeague is the highest level tier and most important professional club competition between basketball teams in Europe, with teams from up to 18 countries, from members of FIBA Europe, mostly consisting of teams from ULEB member national domestic leagues. The EuroLeague's records for individual players, coaches, and teams have been set over two different eras of the competition. The league's first era, when the competition was organized by FIBA, and the league's second era, organized by EuroLeague Basketball.

The FIBA era records of the competition were set from 1958 to 2001, including the lone season of the FIBA SuproLeague competition. While the EuroLeague Basketball era records of the competition have been set since 2000. There are also the overall historical records of the EuroLeague, which are the records for all formats and organizing bodies of the league's history, since 1958.

== FIBA EuroLeague records (1958–2001) ==
=== Player records ===
The following records include only games played when the EuroLeague competition was under the control of FIBA, from the 1958 FIBA European Champions Cup season to the 2000–01 FIBA SuproLeague season. These records do not include any games played in the EuroLeague from the 2000–01 EuroLeague season to the present, since the competition has been controlled by the EuroLeague Basketball Company.

=== Game ===
- Most points scored in a game

- 99 by (Socialist Federal Republic of Yugoslavia) Radivoj Korać ( (Socialist Federal Republic of Yugoslavia) OKK Beograd), against Alviks on January 14, 1965

- Most total rebounds in a game

- 30 by (Greece) Michalis Romanidis ( (Greece) Aris Thessaloniki), against BV Den Helder on December 5, 1991
- 30 by (United States) John Pinone ( (Spain) Estudiantes), against Aris Thessaloniki on November 7, 1991

- Most assists in a game

- 20 by (Bulgaria) Codi Miller-McIntyre ( (Spain) Baskonia), against LDLC ASVEL on February 8, 2024

- Most steals in a game

- 11 by (France) Jimmy Nébot ( (France) ASVEL Lyon), against Efes Istanbul on April 3, 1997
- 11 by (United States) Marcus Webb ( (Russia) CSKA Moscow), against PAOK on January 8, 1998

- Most blocked shots in a game

- 10 by (Croatia) Stojko Vranković ( (Italy) PAF Bologna), against Cibona on February 8, 2001

- Most 3-point field goals made in a game

- 11 by (Germany) Andreas Obst ( (Germany) FC Bayern Munich), against Barcelona on November 22, 2024

=== Season ===
Note: Average leaders only include players who played in at least 50% of the games in the season

- Most points scored

- 661 by (Greece) Nikos Galis ( (Greece) Aris), 1988–89

- Highest scoring average

- 54.8 by (Socialist Federal Republic of Yugoslavia) Radivoj Korać ( (Socialist Federal Republic of Yugoslavia) OKK Beograd), 1964–65

- Most total rebounds

- 256 by (Croatia) Stojko Vranković ( (Greece) Panathinaikos), 1994–95

- Highest total rebounds per game average

- 12.8 by (United States) Roy Tarpley ( (Greece) Olympiacos), 1993–94

- Most assists

- 143 by (Russia) Vasily Karasev ( (Russia) CSKA Moscow), 1995–96

- Highest assists per game average

- 7.2 by (Russia) Vasily Karasev ( (Russia) CSKA Moscow), 1995–96

- Most steals

- 71 by (Italy) Riccardo Pittis ( (Italy) Olimpia Milano), 1991–92

- Highest steals per game average

- 3.7 by (Italy) Riccardo Pittis ( (Italy) Olimpia Milano), 1991–92

- Most blocked shots

- 47 by (Russia) Andrei Kirilenko ( (Russia) CSKA Moscow), 2000–01

- Highest blocked shots per game average

- 2.1 by (Russia) Andrei Kirilenko ( (Russia) CSKA Moscow), 2000–01

=== Career ===
- Most games played

- 205 by (Israel) Miki Berkovich

- Most points scored

- 4,047 by (Greece) Nikos Galis

- Most points per game average

- 43.6 by (Socialist Federal Republic of Yugoslavia) Radivoj Korać

- Most steals

- 256 by (Italy) Riccardo Pittis

== EuroLeague Basketball records (2001–present) ==
=== Player records ===
The following records include only games played since the EuroLeague competition came under the control of the EuroLeague Basketball Company, starting with the 2000–01 EuroLeague season. These records do not include any games played in the EuroLeague from the 1958 FIBA European Champions Cup season to the 2000–01 FIBA SuproLeague season, when FIBA Europe controlled the competition.

=== Game ===
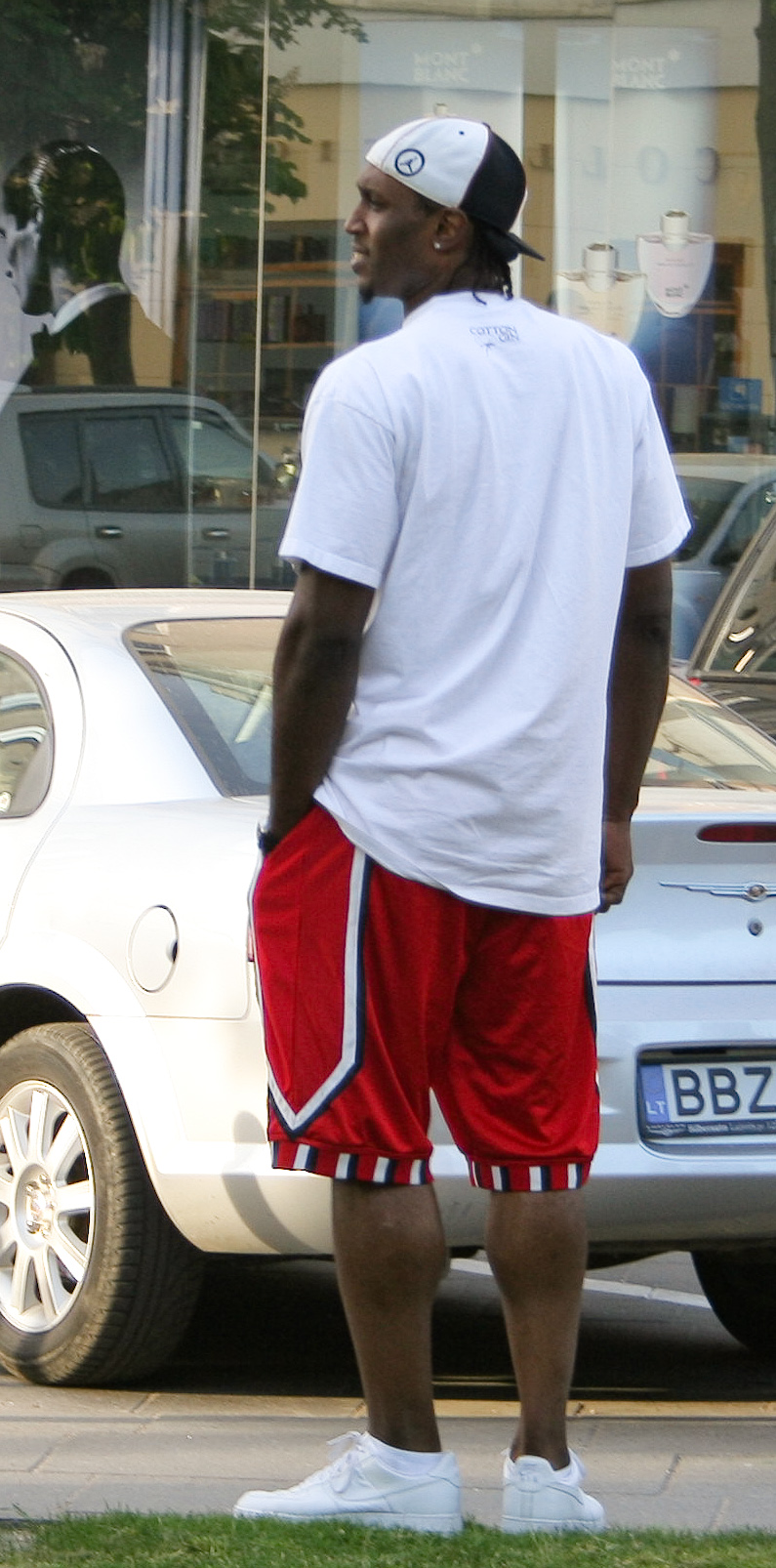
Tanoka Beard holds the record for the most PIR in a game with 63

- Most PIR in a game

- 63 by (United States) Tanoka Beard ( (Lithuania) Žalgiris Kaunas), against Skipper Bologna on January 22, 2004

- Most points scored in a game

- 50 by (United States) Nigel Hayes-Davis ( (Turkey) Fenerbahçe), against Alba Berlin on March 29, 2024

- Most total rebounds in a game

- 24 by (Greece) Antonis Fotsis ( (Russia) Dynamo Moscow), against Benetton Basket on March 21, 2007

- Most offensive rebounds in a game

- 16 by (Serbia) Nikola Milutinov ( (Russia) CSKA Moscow), against Olimpia Milano on December 30, 2020

- Most defensive rebounds in a game

- 18 by (Lithuania) Donatas Motiejūnas ( (Poland) Asseco Prokom), against Union Olimpija on December 7, 2011

- Most assists in a game

- 20 by (Bulgaria) Codi Miller-McIntyre ( (Spain) Saski Baskonia), against ASVEL Basket on February 8, 2024

- Most steals in a game

- 11 by (United States) Jeff Trepagnier ( (Turkey) Ülker), against Partizan on January 26, 2006

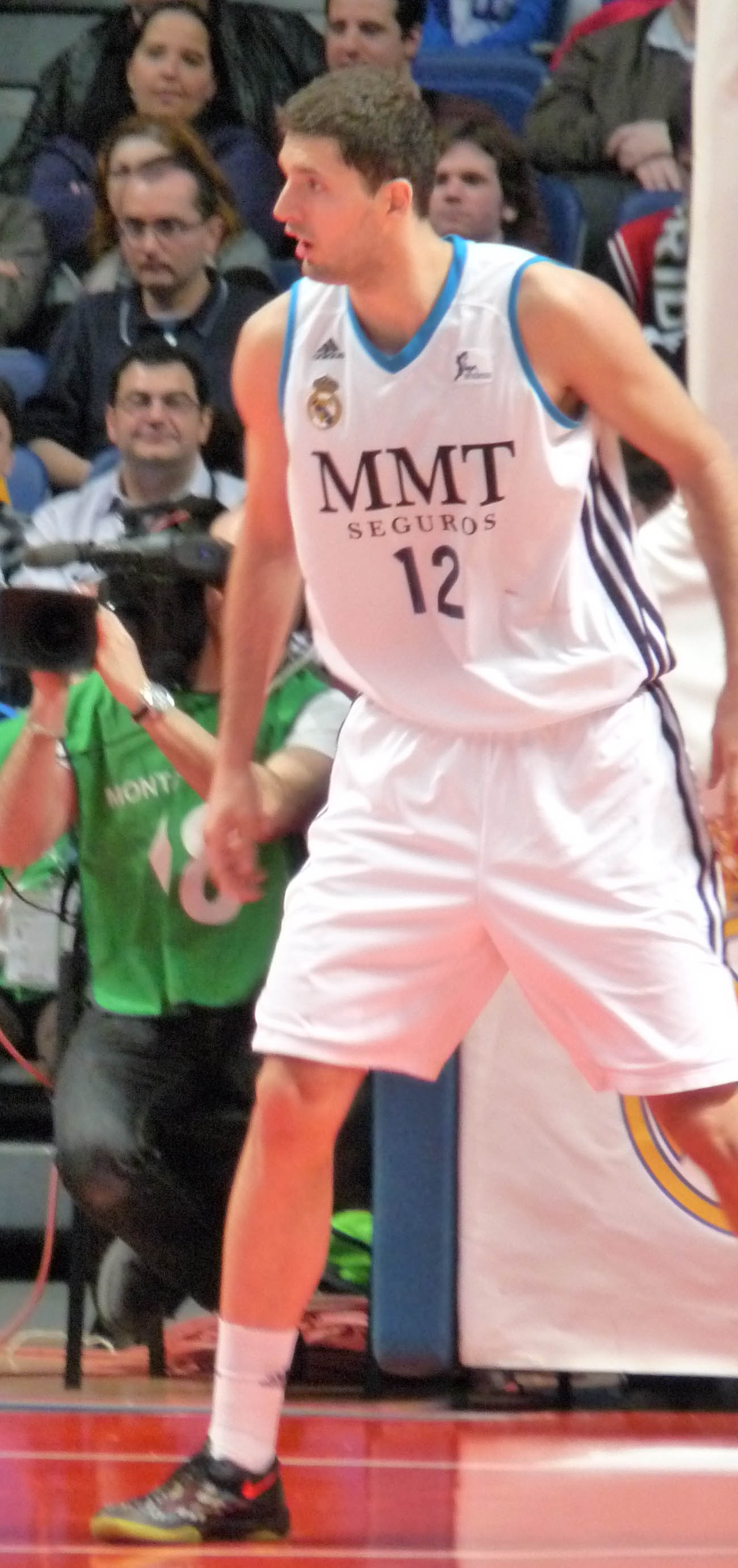
Nikola Mirotić holds the records for the most free throws made and free throws made without a miss

- Most blocked shots in a game

- 10 by (Croatia) Stojko Vranković ( (Italy) PAF Bologna), against Cibona on February 8, 2001

- Most turnovers in a game

- 11 by (Russia) Sergei Bazarevich ( (Russia) St. Petersburg Lions), against AEK Athens on December 13, 2000

- Most free throws made in a game

- 18 by (Spain) Nikola Mirotić ( (Spain) Real Madrid), against Žalgiris Kaunas on March 17, 2013 (18/18)

- Most free throws made in a game without a miss

- 18 by (Spain) Nikola Mirotić ( (Spain) Real Madrid), against Žalgiris Kaunas on March 17, 2013

- Most free throws attempted in a game

- 21 by (United States) Bobby Brown ( (Italy) Montepaschi Siena), against Fenerbahçe on November 2, 2012 (16/21)

- Most 2-point field goals made in a game

- 18 by (Latvia) Kaspars Kambala ( (Turkey) Efes Pilsen), against FC Barcelona on October 30, 2002 (18/28)

- Most 2-point field goals made in a game without a miss

- 11 by (Mexico) Gustavo Ayón ( (Spain) Real Madrid), against Fenerbahçe on May 19, 2019

- Most 2-point field goals attempted in a game

- 28 by (Latvia) Kaspars Kambala ( (Turkey) Efes Pilsen), against FC Barcelona on October 30, 2002 (18/28)

- Most 3-point field goals made in a game

- 11 by (Germany) Andreas Obst ( (Germany) Bayern Munich), against Barcelona on November 22, 2024 (11/16)

- Most 3-point field goals made in a game without a miss

- 9 by (Lithuania) Saulius Štombergas ( (Spain) Tau Ceramica), against AEK Athens on April 4, 2001

- Most 3-point field goals attempted in a game

- 21 by (Russia) Alexey Shved ( (Russia) Khimki), against Olympiacos on December 18, 2019 (7/21)

=== Season ===
Note: Average leaders only include players who played in at least 51% of the games in the season

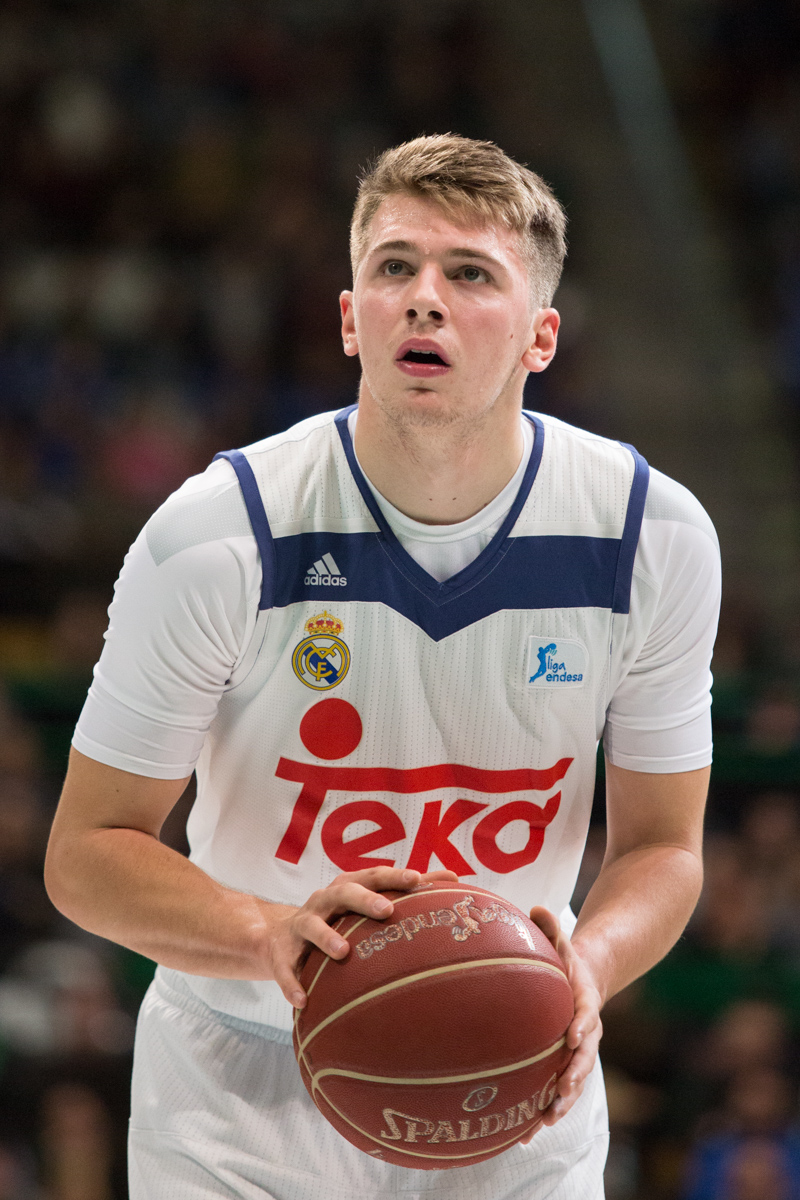
Luka Dončić holds the record for the most total PIR accumulated in a single season

- Most minutes played

- 1,138 by (United States) Brad Wanamaker ( (Turkey) Darüşşafaka), 2016–2017

- Most minutes per game

- 38.35 by (United States) Derrick Hamilton ( (Russia) Spartak Saint Petersburg), 2000–01

- Most PIR

- 711 by (Slovenia) Luka Dončić ( (Spain) Real Madrid), 2017–18

- Highest PIR per game average

- 30.92 by (Federal Republic of Yugoslavia) Dejan Tomašević ( (Federal Republic of Yugoslavia) Budućnost), 2000–01

- Most points scored

- 740 by (Russia) Alexey Shved ( (Russia) Khimki), 2017–18

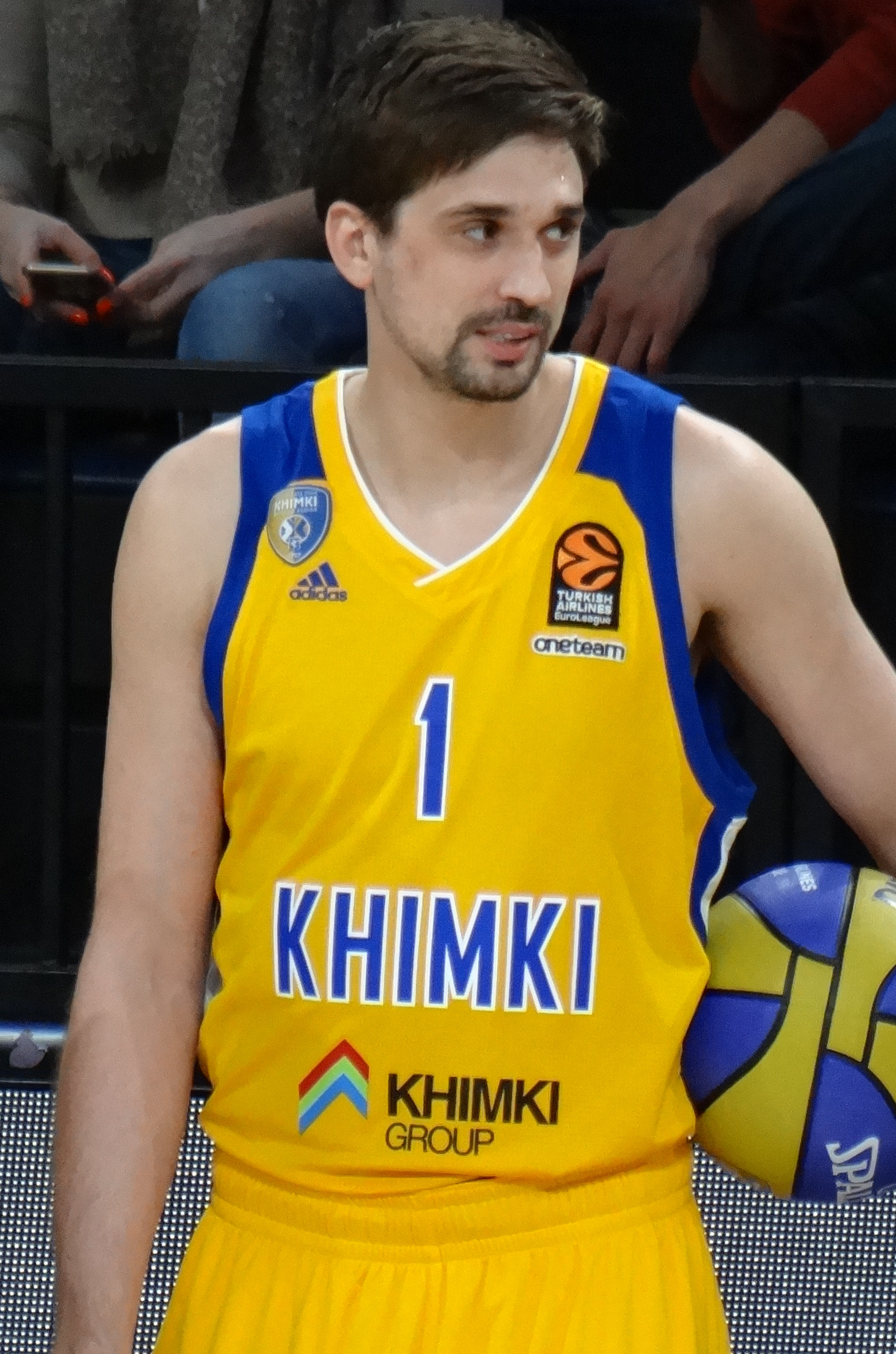
Alexey Shved holds the records for the most total points and 3-pointers made in a single season

- Highest scoring average

- 26.0 by (United States) Alphonso Ford ( (Greece) Peristeri), 2000–01

- Most total rebounds

- 282 by (France) Vincent Poirier ( (Spain) Baskonia), 2018–19

- Highest total rebounds per game average

- 12.8 by (Turkey) Mirsad Türkcan ( (Russia) CSKA Moscow), 2001–02

- Most offensive rebounds

- 117 by (France) Vincent Poirier ( (Spain) Baskonia), 2018–19

- Highest offensive rebounds per game average

- 5.0 by (Federal Republic of Yugoslavia) Dejan Tomašević ( (Federal Republic of Yugoslavia) Budućnost), 2000–01

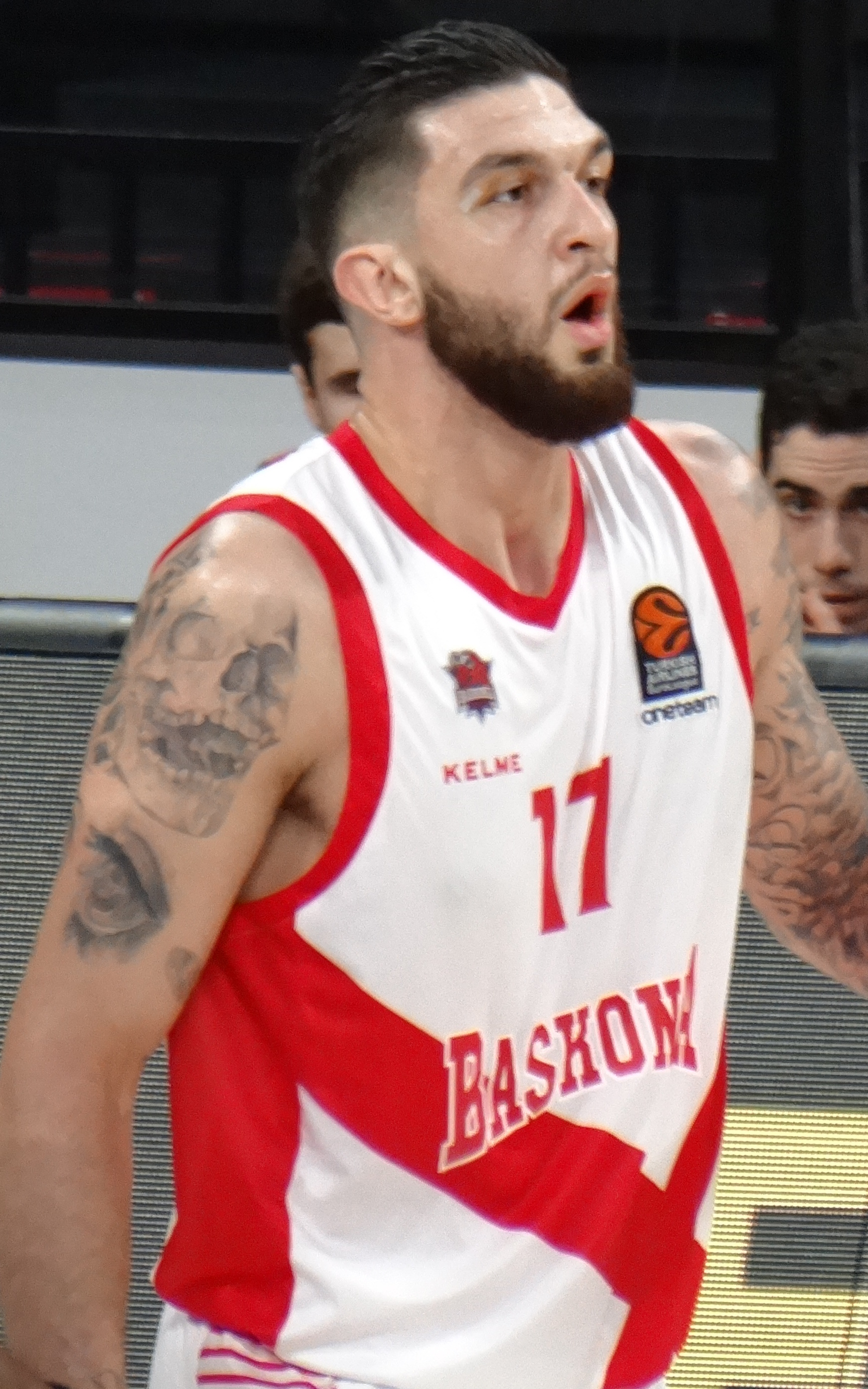
Vincent Poirier holds the record for most total rebounds in a season, with 282

- Most defensive rebounds

- 202 by (Greece) Ioannis Bourousis ( (Spain) Baskonia), 2015–16

- Highest defensive rebounds per game average

- 8.95 by (Turkey) Mirsad Türkcan ( (Italy) Montepaschi Siena), 2002–03

- Most assists

- 286 by (Greece) Nick Calathes ( (Greece) Panathinaikos), 2018–19

- Highest assists per game average

- 9.11 by (Greece) Nick Calathes ( (Greece) Panathinaikos), 2019–20

- Most steals

- 64 by (Argentina) Manu Ginóbili ( (Italy) Kinder Bologna), 2000–01

- Highest steals per game average

- 3.7 by (United States) Jemeil Rich ( (Switzerland) Lugano Snakes), 2000–01
- 3.7 by (Croatia) Ivica Marić ( (Croatia) Zadar), 2000–01

- Most blocked shots

- 68 by (Nigeria) Ekpe Udoh ( (Turkey) Fenerbahçe), 2016–17

- Highest blocked shots per game average

- 3.21 by (Ukraine) Grigorij Khizhnyak ( (Lithuania) Žalgiris Kaunas), 2001–02

- Most free throws made

- 168 by (United States) Keith Langford ( (Russia) UNICS Kazan), 2016–17

- Most free throws attempted

- 202 by (United States) Keith Langford ( (Russia) UNICS Kazan), 2016–17

- Highest free throw percentage

- 98.21% by (Israel) John DiBartolomeo ( (Israel) Maccabi Tel Aviv), 2022–23

- Most field goals made

- 239 by (Russia) Alexey Shved ( (Russia) Khimki), 2017–18

- Most field goals attempted

- 587 by (Russia) Alexey Shved ( (Russia) Khimki), 2017–18

- Highest field goal percentage

- 80.49% by (Greece) Giannis Giannoulis ( (Greece) Panathinaikos), 2001–02

- Most 2-point field goals made

- 176 by (Uganda) Brandon Davies ( (Lithuania) Žalgiris), 2018–19

- Most 2-point field goals attempted

- 315 by (Uganda) Brandon Davies ( (Lithuania) Žalgiris), 2018–19

- Highest 2-point field goal percentage

- 82.5% by (Greece) Giannis Giannoulis ( (Greece) Panathinaikos), 2001–02
- 82.5% by (United States) Terence Morris ( (Spain) FC Barcelona), 2009–10

- Most 3-point field goals made

- 107 by (Russia) Alexey Shved ( (Russia) Khimki), 2017–18

- Most 3-point field goals attempted

- 324 by (Russia) Alexey Shved ( (Russia) Khimki), 2017–18

- Highest 3-point field goal percentage

- 60.0% by (Poland) Paweł Wiekiera ( (Poland) Śląsk Wrocław), 2002–03

=== Career ===
Note: Average leaders only include players that played in at least 31 EuroLeague games over their career

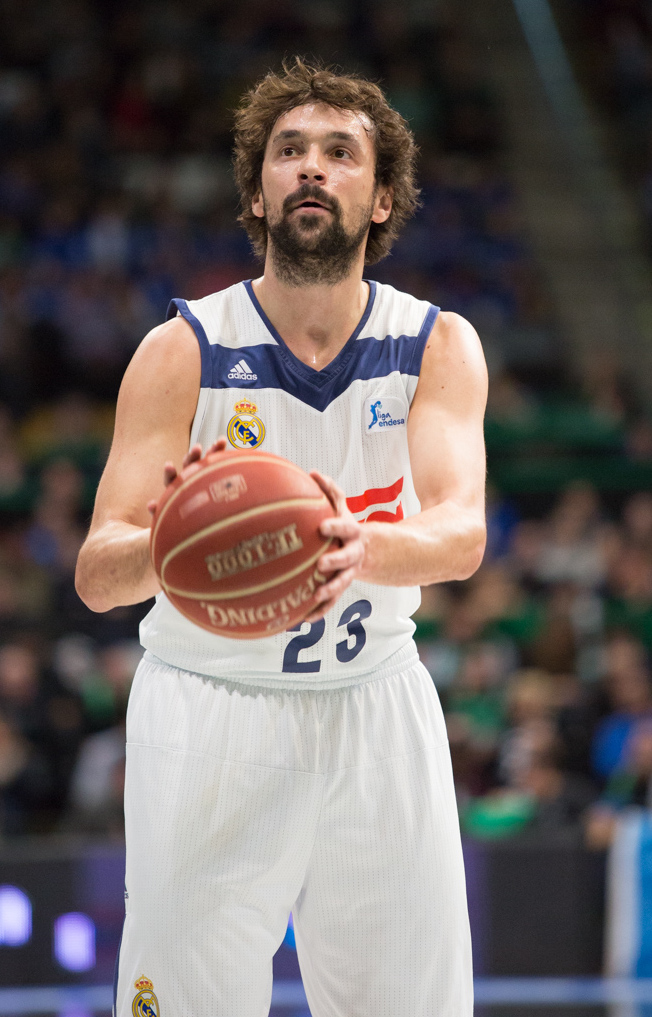
Sergio Llull has the most minutes and games played, and the most 3-point field goals made as well in Euroleague history

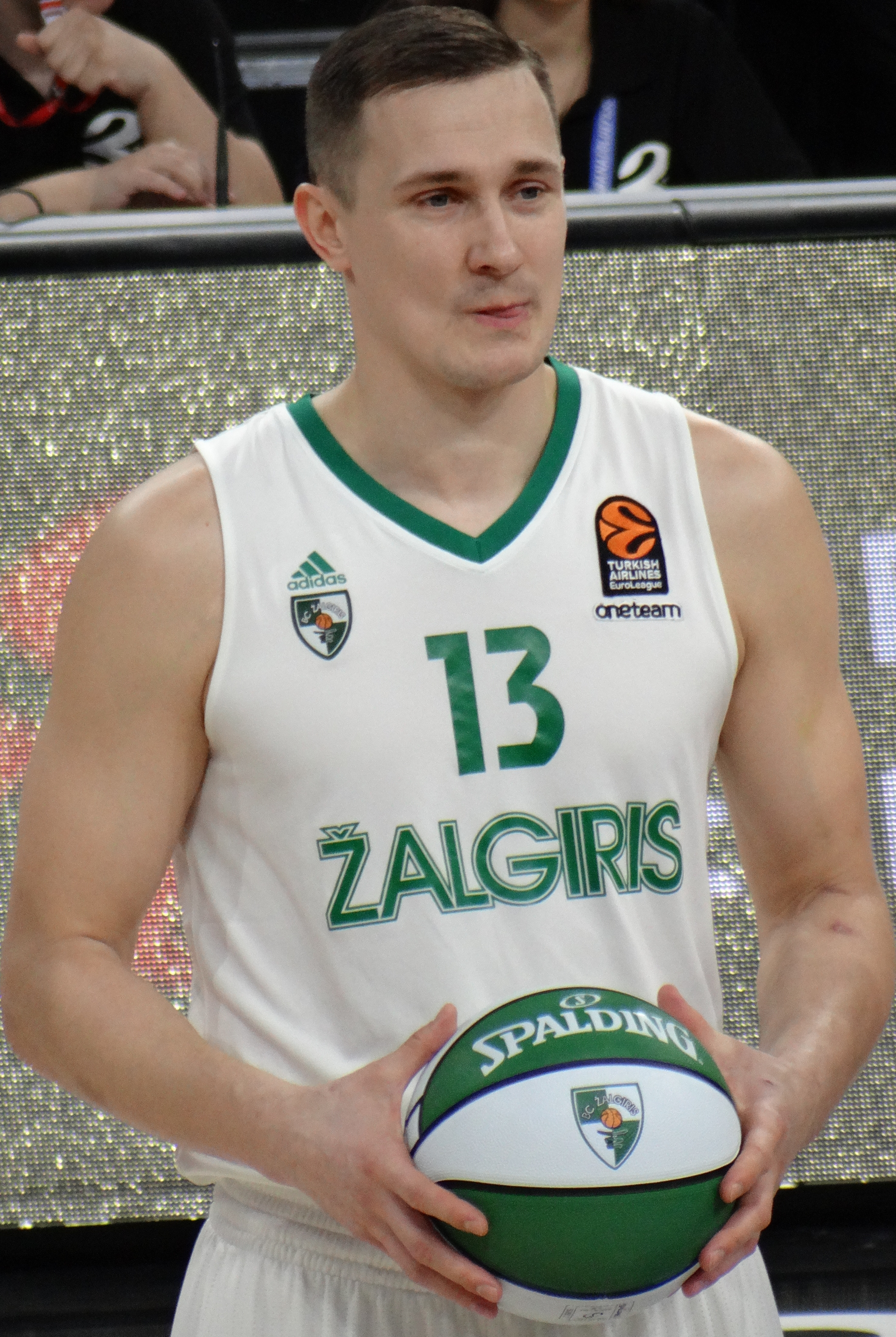
Paulius Jankūnas has the most total rebounds in EuroLeague history

- Most games played

- 426 by (Spain) Sergio Llull

- Most games started

- 321 by (Greece) Kostas Papanikolaou

- Most minutes played

- 9,440 by (Spain) Sergio Llull

- Most minutes per game

- 35.0 by (United States) Anthony Parker

- Most PIR

- 5,284 by (France) Nando de Colo

- Most PIR per game average

- 21.41 by (United States) Anthony Parker

- Most points scored

- 4,922 by (United States) Mike James

- Most points per game average

- 22.22 by (United States) Alphonso Ford

- Most seasons leading league in points per game average

- 2 by (United States) Alphonso Ford
- 2 by (Serbia) Igor Rakočević

- Most total rebounds

- 2,010 by (Lithuania) Paulius Jankūnas

- Most total rebounds per game average

- 10.1 by (United States) Joseph Blair

- Most seasons leading league in rebounds per game average

- 5 by (Turkey) Mirsad Türkcan

- Most offensive rebounds

- 824 by (United States) Kyle Hines

- Most offensive rebounds per game average

- 3.4 by (United States) Tanoka Beard

- Most defensive rebounds

- 1,453 by (Lithuania) Paulius Jankūnas

- Most defensive rebounds per game average

- 6.99 by (Turkey) Mirsad Türkcan

- Most assists

- 2,092 by (Greece) Nick Calathes

- Most assists per game average

- 5.82 by (Greece) Nick Calathes

- Most seasons leading league in assists per game average

- 3 by (Greece) Nick Calathes

- Most steals

- 451 by (Greece) Nick Calathes

- Most steals per game average

- 2.77 by (Argentina) Manu Ginóbili

- Most seasons leading league in steals per game average

- 3 by (Greece) Nick Calathes

- Most blocked shots

- 451 by (Cape Verde) Edy Tavares

- Most blocked shots per game average

- 3.19 by (Ukraine) Grigorij Khizhnyak

- Most seasons leading league in blocked shots per game average

- 5 by (Cape Verde) Edy Tavares

- Most free throws made

- 1,139 by (France) Nando de Colo

- Most free throws attempted

- 1,451 by (Greece) Vassilis Spanoulis

- Highest free throw percentage

- 93.1% by (France) Nando de Colo

- Most 2-point field goals made

- 1,555 by (Czech Republic) Jan Veselý

- Most 2-point field goals attempted

- 2,512 by (Czech Republic) Jan Veselý

- Highest 2-point field goals percentage

- 72.35% by (Cape Verde) Edy Tavares

- Most 3-point field goals made

- 664 by (Spain) Sergio Llull

- Most 3-point field goals attempted

- 1,995 by (Spain) Sergio Llull

- Highest 3-point field goals percentage

- 50.45% by (Croatia) Fran Pilepić

== FIBA EuroLeague & EuroLeague Basketball records (1958–present) ==
=== Player records ===
The following records include all of the games played under all of the league's formats, since the EuroLeague competition was first created, starting with the 1958 FIBA European Champions Cup season.

=== Career ===
Note: Average leaders only include players that played in at least 31 EuroLeague games over their career

- Most games played

- 428 by (Spain) Sergio Llull

- Most games started

- 321 by (Greece) Kostas Papanikolaou

- Most minutes played

- 9,440 by (Spain) Sergio Llull

- Most PIR

- 5,284 by (France) Nando de Colo

- Most points scored

- 4,942 by (United States) Mike James

- Most points per game average

- 32.4 by (Greece) Nikos Galis

- Most total rebounds

- 2,010 by (Lithuania) Paulius Jankūnas

- Most seasons leading league in rebounds per game average

- 5 by (Turkey) Mirsad Türkcan

- Most assists

- 2,095 by (Greece) Nick Calathes

- Most seasons leading league in assists per game average

- 4 by (Greece) Nick Calathes

- Most steals

- 452 by (Greece) Nick Calathes

- Most seasons leading league in steals per game average

- 4 by (Italy) Riccardo Pittis

- Most blocked shots

- 451 by (Cape Verde) Edy Tavares

- Most blocked shots per game average

- 2.22 by (Nigeria) Ekpe Udoh

- Most seasons leading league in blocked shots per game average

- 5 by (Cape Verde) Edy Tavares

- Most 3-point field goals made

- 666 by (Spain) Sergio Llull

- Most 3-point field goals attempted

- 1,995 by (Spain) Sergio Llull

=== Team records ===
- Most points – regulation

- 172 – (Bulgaria) Academic against (Morocco) Renaissance Berkane on November 15, 1973

- Fewest points

- 17 – (Northern Ireland) Celtic against (Iceland) ÍR on December 5, 1964

- Fewest points in a half

- 5 – (Northern Ireland) Celtic against (Iceland) ÍR on December 5, 1964

- Largest margin of victory

- 119 – (Bulgaria) Academic (172) against (Morocco) Renaissance Berkane (53) on November 15, 1973

- Most points in 2nd half

- 96 – (Bulgaria) Academic against (Morocco) Renaissance Berkane on November 15, 1973

== Awards ==
Since the 1958 EuroLeague season:

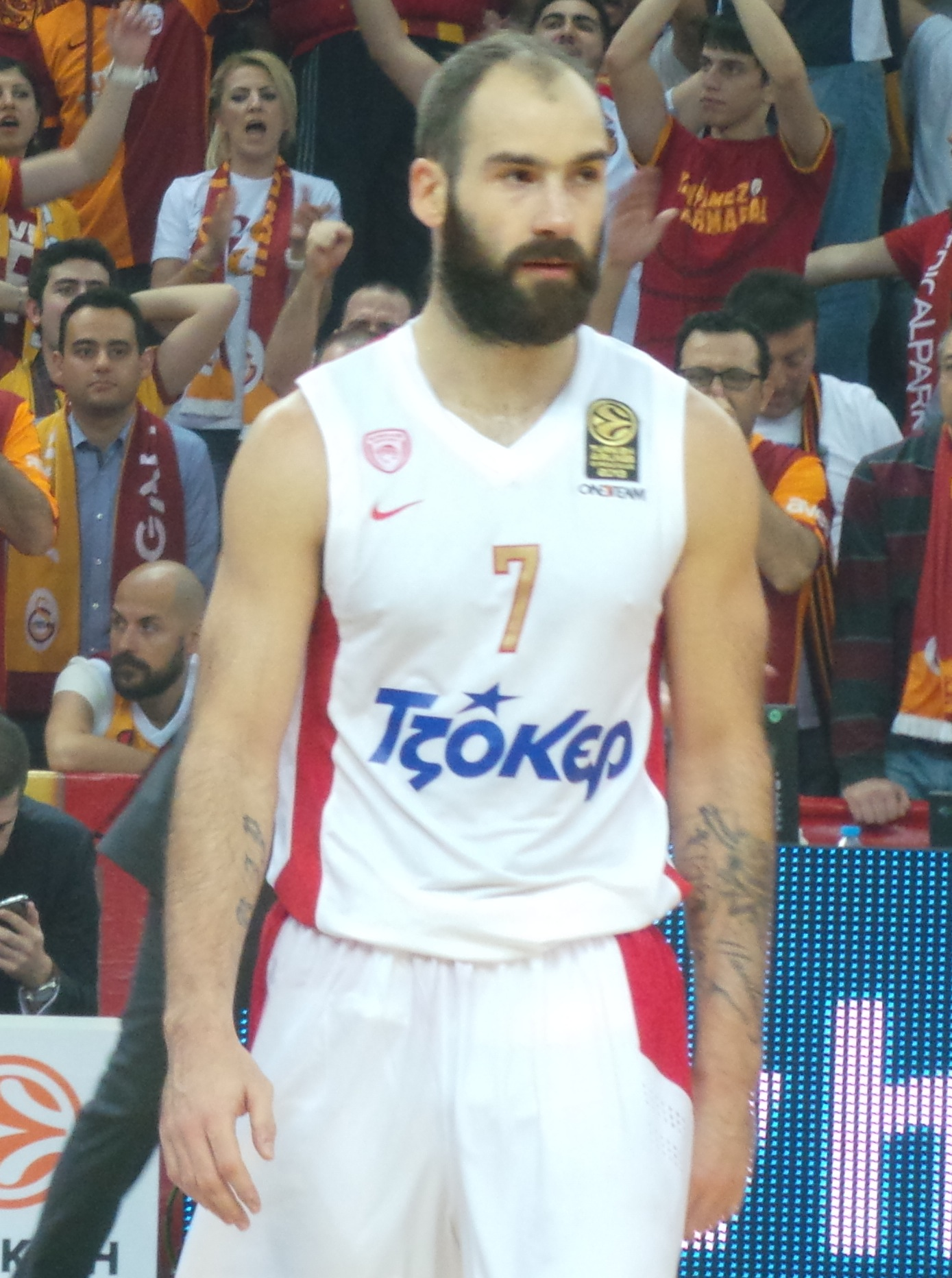
Vassilis Spanoulis has won the EuroLeague Final Four MVP three times

- Most EuroLeague MVP Awards

- 2 by (United States) Anthony Parker

- Most EuroLeague Final Four MVP Awards

- 3 by (Croatia) Toni Kukoč
- 3 by (Greece) Vassilis Spanoulis

- Most EuroLeague Finals Top Scorer Awards

- 3 by (Soviet Union) Jānis Krūmiņš
- 3 by (Soviet Union) Sergei Belov

- Most All-EuroLeague First Team honors

- 5 by (Spain) Juan Carlos Navarro

- Most FIBA European Selection / FIBA EuroStar / All-EuroLeague Team honors

- 8 by (Greece) Vassilis Spanoulis

- Most EuroLeague MVP of the Month Awards

- 7 by (Spain) Nikola Mirotić

- Most EuroLeague MVP of the Round Awards

- 17 by (United States) (Turkey) Shane Larkin

- Most Alphonso Ford Trophies

- 3 by (Serbia) Igor Rakočević

- Most EuroLeague Rising Star awards

- 2 by (Spain) Nikola Mirotić
- 2 by (Serbia) Bogdan Bogdanović
- 2 by (Slovenia) Luka Dončić

- Most EuroLeague Best Defender awards

- 6 by (Greece) Dimitris Diamantidis

- Most EuroLeague Coach of the Year awards

- 3 by (Greece) Giorgos Bartzokas
- 3 by (Serbia) Željko Obradović

== Team records since the 2000–01 EuroLeague season ==
=== Game ===
- Most PIR

- 175 – (Israel) Maccabi Tel Aviv against (Italy) Scavolini Pesaro on November 25, 2004

- Fewest PIR

- (-2) – (Italy) Montepaschi Siena against (Greece) Olympiacos on March 22, 2011

- Most points – overtime

- 134 – (Spain) FC Barcelona against (Spain) Baskonia on December 20, 2025

- Most points – regulation

- 125 – Monaco against (France) Paris Basketball on December 4, 2025

- Most points in a quarter

- 43 – (Israel) Maccabi Tel Aviv against (Italy) Montepaschi Siena on March 4, 2010

- Most combined points in the first quarter

- 72 – (Spain) Real Madrid (32) against (Serbia) Partizan (40) on November 24, 2022

- Most combined points in a quarter

- 77 – (Lithuania) Žalgiris (41) against (France) Nancy (36) on January 9, 2009

- Most points in 1st half

- 67 – (Spain) Saski Baskonia against (Israel) Hapoel Tel Aviv on March 27, 2026

- Most points in 2nd half

- 70 – (Spain) Real Madrid against (Portugal) Ovarense on December 20, 2000

- Most combined points at halftime

- 131 – (Spain) Saski Baskonia (67) against (Israel) Hapoel Tel Aviv (64) on March 27, 2026

- Most combined points after 3 quarters

- 181 – (Spain) Real Madrid (91) against (Israel) Maccabi Tel Aviv (90) on January 14, 2025

- Most combined points – regulation

- 229 – (Spain) Real Madrid (116) against (Israel) Maccabi Tel Aviv (113) on January 14, 2025

- 229 – Monaco (125) against (France) Paris Basketball (104) on December 4, 2025

- Most combined points – overtime

- 258 – (Spain) FC Barcelona (134) against (Spain) Baskonia (124) in 3 overtimes on December 20, 2025

- Fewest points

- 35 – (Slovenia) KK Krka against (Russia) CSKA Moscow on November 19, 2003

- Fewest points in a quarter

- 2 – (Italy) Benetton Basket against (Turkey) Efes Pilsen on March 10, 2005
- 2 – (Greece) Maroussi against (Serbia) KK Partizan on February 11, 2011

- 2 – (Lithuania) Žalgiris Kaunas against (Turkey) Anadolu Efes on December 4, 2014

- 2 - Monaco against (Greece) Olympiacos BC on May 19, 2023

- Fewest points in a half

- 9 – (Italy) Montepaschi Siena against (Greece) Olympiacos on March 22, 2011

- Fewest points after 3 quarters

- 22 – (Italy) Montepaschi Siena against (Greece) Olympiacos on March 22, 2011

- Largest margin of victory

- 63 – (Italy) Montepaschi Siena (112) against (Montenegro) KK Budućnost (49) on February 13, 2003

- Largest margin at half-time

- 38 – (Greece) Olympiacos (47) against (Italy) Montepaschi Siena (9) on March 22, 2011

- Most field goals made

- 46 – (Spain) Real Madrid against (Croatia) KK Zadar on January 10, 2002
- 46 – (Turkey) Anadolu Efes against (Spain) Real Madrid on January 5, 2024

- Most field goals attempted

- 91 – (Italy) Virtus Bologna against (United Kingdom) London Towers on February 7, 2002

- Best field goals percentage

- 77.78 % – (Spain) Laboral Kutxa against (Italy) AJ Milano on February 25, 2009

- Most free throws made

- 34 – (Spain) Real Madrid against (Russia) Ural Great on March 27, 2002

- Most 3-point field goals made

- 24 – (Turkey) Fenerbahçe against (Spain) Valencia Basket on March 14, 2024

- Most 3-point field goals attempted

- 52 – (France) Paris Basketball against (Germany) Alba Berlin on October 29, 2024

- Best 3-point field goals percentage

- 84.62 % – (Spain) FC Barcelona against (Croatia) Cibona on February 5, 2003

- Most Rebounds

- 62 – (Poland) Asseco Prokom against (Italy) Montepaschi Siena on December 13, 2012

- Most Offensive Rebounds

- 30 – (Russia) CSKA Moscow against (Italy) Olimpia Milano on December 30, 2020
- 30 – (Turkey) Fenerbahçe against (France) Paris Basketball on March 3, 2025

- Most Defensive Rebounds

- 43 – (Poland) Asseco Prokom against (Spain) Unicaja on February 3, 2010

- Most Assists

- 38 – (Israel) Maccabi Tel Aviv against (Italy) Virtus Bologna on March 28, 2023

- Most Steals

- 33 – (Italy) Virtus Bologna against (Spain) Adecco Estudiantes on February 1, 2001

- Most Blocks

- 12 – (Lithuania) Žalgiris Kaunas against (Spain) Adecco Estudiantes on December 14, 2000
- 12 – (Lithuania) Žalgiris Kaunas against (Poland) Asseco Prokom on December 18, 2008

- Most Turnovers

- 35 – (Spain) Unicaja against (Spain) DKV Joventut on December 20, 2006

- Fewest Turnovers

- 2 – (Spain) Real Madrid against (Russia) CSKA Moscow on March 20, 2014

- Most Fouls Committed

- 41 – (Italy) Skipper Bologna against (Greece) Panathinaikos on January 14, 2004

=== Season ===
- Best Record

- 20–2 – (Spain) FC Barcelona, 2009–10

- Worst Record

- 0–14 – (United Kingdom) London Towers, 2001–02

- Worst Record, qualified to top 16

- 2–8 – (Poland) Asseco Prokom, 2008–09

- Longest winning streak

- 18 – (Russia) CSKA Moscow, 2006–07

- Longest winning streak from season start

- 17 – (Russia) CSKA Moscow, 2004–05

- Longest losing streak

- 17 – (Russia) Khimki, 2020–21

- Most PIR per game

- 111.92 – (Israel) Maccabi Tel Aviv, 2004–05

- Fewest PIR per game

- 42.29 – (United Kingdom) London Towers, 2001–02

- Most points per game

- 92.04 – (Israel) Maccabi Tel Aviv, 2004–05

- Fewest points per game

- 58.90 – (Slovenia) Union Olimpija, 2011–12

- Most assists per game

- 19.13 – (Russia) Khimki Moscow, 2012–13

- Most steals per game

- 17.10 – (Switzerland) Lugano Snakes, 2000–01

- Most blocks per game

- 5.58 – (Lithuania) Žalgiris Kaunas, 2000–01

- Most turnovers per game

- 20.50 – (Portugal) Ovarense, 2000–01

- Fewest turnovers per game

- 9.85 – (Turkey) Galatasaray, 2013–14

- Highest free throw percentage

- 82.64 % – (Croatia) KK Zagreb, 2011–12

- Highest 2-point field goals percentage

- 59.18 % – (Spain) Real Madrid, 2001–02

- Highest 3-point field goals percentage

- 45.38 % – (Serbia) KK Partizan, 2001–02
