= Marijan Kraljević =

Slovene basketball player

Marijan Mario Kraljević
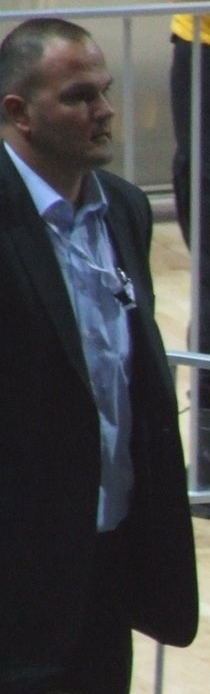
- Mario Kraljevič 2009

Personal information
- Born: 30 April 1970 (age 56) Pforzheim, West Germany
- Listed height: 6 ft 11 in (2.11 m)

Career information
- Playing career: 1989–2004
- Position: Center

Career history
- 1987–1988: Jugoplastika
- 1988–1989: Cibona
- 1989–1994: Smelt Olimpija
- 1994–1996: Krško
- 1996: Atlantic City Seagulls
- 1996–1999: Union Olimpija
- 1999–2000: Türk Telekom
- 2000: Zepter Śląsk Wrocław
- 2000–2001: Saint Petersburg Lions
- 2001: Bipop-Carire Reggio Emilia
- 2001–2002: Slovakofarma Pezinok
- 2002–2003: Lokomotiv Mineralnye Vody
- 2003–2004: Panellinios
- 2004: Slovan

Career highlights
- FIBA Saporta Cup champion (1994); 6x Slovenian League champion (1992, 1993, 1994, 1997, 1998, 1999); 6x Slovenian Cup winner (1992, 1993, 1994, 1997, 1998, 1999); Slovak League champion (2002); Slovak Cup winner (2002); Greek 2nd Division champion (2004)
Medals
Men's basketball
Representing Yugoslavia
European Championship for Cadets
Gold medal – first place	1987 Hungary	under-16
European Championship for Juniors
Gold medal – first place	1988 Yugoslavia	Under-18

Marijan Mario Kraljević (born April 30, 1970 in Pforzheim, West Germany) is former Slovenian-Croatian professional basketball player.

== National team career ==
Kraljević was a member of the senior Slovenia national basketball team. He competed at EuroBasket 1993, EuroBasket 1995, EuroBasket 1999, EuroBasket 2001, and EuroBasket 2003. He represented Slovenia officially in 73 games, and scored a total of 219 points.

== Personal life ==
His son Luka, is also a basketball player.

== Career statistics ==
Legend
GP	Games played	GS	Games started	MPG	Minutes per game
FG%	Field-goal percentage	3P%	3-point field-goal percentage	FT%	Free-throw percentage
RPG	Rebounds per game	APG	Assists per game	SPG	Steals per game
BPG	Blocks per game	PPG	Points per game	PIR	Performance index rating
**Bold**	Career high

=== EuroLeague ===
Year	Team	GP	GS	MPG	FG%	3P%	FT%	RPG	APG	SPG	BPG	PPG	PIR
2000–01	Saint Petersburg Lions	**9**	**4**	**17.0**	**.462**	**.000**	**.563**	**2.7**	**.7**	**.7**	**.1**	**5.0**	**4.1**
