= Florida Mr. Basketball =

Honor awarded to high school basketball players

Each year the Florida Mr. Basketball award is given to the person chosen as the best high school boys basketball player in the U.S. state of Florida.

The winner of the Mr. Basketball Award, sponsored by Florida Dairy Farmers, Inc. and the Florida Athletic Coaches Association, is determined in voting by a statewide panel of high school basketball coaches and prep media representatives.

== Award winners ==
Year	Player	High School	College	NBA Draft
2026	Caleb Gaskins	Christopher Columbus High School, Miami	Miami (FL)	
2025	Cameron Boozer (3)	Christopher Columbus High School, Miami	Duke	2026 NBA draft: Round 1, 3rd overall by the Memphis Grizzlies
2024	Cameron Boozer (2)	Christopher Columbus High School, Miami	Duke	2026 NBA draft: Round 1, 3rd overall by the Memphis Grizzlies
2023	Cameron Boozer	Christopher Columbus High School, Miami	Duke	2026 NBA draft: Round 1, 3rd overall by the Memphis Grizzlies
2022	Brice Sensabaugh	Lake Highland Preparatory School, Orlando	Ohio State	2023 NBA draft: Round 1, 28th overall by the Utah Jazz
2021	Dallan Coleman	West Nassau High School, Callahan	Georgia Tech	
2020	Isaiah Adams	Paxon School for Advanced Studies, Jacksonville	Central Florida / Buffalo	
2019	Vernon Carey Jr. (2)	NSU University School, Fort Lauderdale	Duke	2020 NBA draft: Round 2, 32nd overall by the Charlotte Hornets
2018	Vernon Carey Jr.	NSU University School, Fort Lauderdale	Duke	2020 NBA draft: Round 2, 32nd overall by the Charlotte Hornets
2017	Kevin Knox II	Tampa Catholic High School, Tampa	Kentucky	2018 NBA draft: 1st Rnd, 9th overall by the New York Knicks
2016	Tony Bradley	Bartow High School, Bartow	North Carolina	2017 NBA draft: 1st Rnd, 28th overall by the Los Angeles Lakers
2015	Antonio Blakeney	Oak Ridge High School, Orlando	LSU	
2014	Joel Berry II (3)	Lake Highland Preparatory School, Apopka	North Carolina	
2013	Joel Berry II (2)	Lake Highland Preparatory School, Apopka	North Carolina	
2012	Joel Berry II	Lake Highland Preparatory School, Apopka	North Carolina	
2011	Austin Rivers	Winter Park High School, Winter Park	Duke	2012 NBA draft: 1st Rnd, 10th overall by the New Orleans Hornets
2010	Brandon Knight (2)	Pine Crest School, Fort Lauderdale	Kentucky	2011 NBA draft: 1st Rnd, 8th overall by the Detroit Pistons
2009	Brandon Knight	Pine Crest School, Fort Lauderdale	Kentucky	2011 NBA Draft: 1st Rnd, 8th overall by the Detroit Pistons
2008	Ray Shipman	Monsignor Edward Pace High School, Miami Gardens	Florida/Central Florida(football)	
2007	Nick Calathes (2)	Lake Howell High School, Winter Park	Florida	2009 NBA draft: 2nd Rnd, 45th overall by the Minnesota Timberwolves
2006	Nick Calathes	Lake Howell High School, Winter Park	Florida	2009 NBA Draft: 2nd Rnd, 45th overall by the Minnesota Timberwolves
2005	Keith Brumbaugh	DeLand High School, DeLand	Hillsborough CC (FL)	
2004	Darius Washington	Edgewater High School, Orlando	Memphis	
2003	Chris Richard	Kathleen High School, Lakeland	Florida	2007 NBA draft: 2nd Rnd, 41st overall by the Minnesota Timberwolves
2002	Amar'e Stoudemire	Cypress Creek High School, Orlando	None	2002 NBA draft: 1st Rnd, 9th overall by the Phoenix Suns
2001	Adrian McPherson	Southeast High School, Bradenton	Florida State (football)	2005 NFL draft: 5th Rnd, 152nd overall by the New Orleans Saints
2000	Orien Greene	Gainesville High School, Gainesville	Florida/UL Lafayette	2005 NBA draft: 2nd Rnd, 53rd overall by the Boston Celtics
1999	Casey Sanders	Tampa Preparatory School, Tampa	Duke	
1998	Teddy Dupay	Mariner High School, Cape Coral	Florida	
1997	Jason Pryor	Fort Walton Beach High School, Fort Walton Beach	Clemson	Undrafted 2001
1996	Luke Barnes	South Miami High School, Miami	Miami	
1995	Vince Carter	Mainland High School, Daytona Beach	North Carolina	1998 NBA draft: 1st Rnd, 5th overall by the Golden State Warriors
1994	LeRon Williams	Southeast High School, Bradenton	Florida	
1993	James Collins	Andrew Jackson High School, Jacksonville	Florida State	1997 NBA draft: 2nd Rnd, 37th overall by the Philadelphia 76ers
1992	Steve Edwards (2)	Miami Senior High School, Miami	Miami	
1991	Steve Edwards	Miami Senior High School, Miami	Miami	
1990	Clifford Rozier	Southeast High School, Bradenton	North Carolina/Louisville	1994 NBA draft: 1st Rnd, 16th overall by the Golden State Warriors
1989	Doug Edwards	Miami Senior High School, Miami	Florida State	1993 NBA draft: 1st Rnd, 13th overall by the Atlanta Hawks
1988	Johnny Walker	Shanks High School, Quincy	Florida	
1987	Chris Corchiani (2)	Hialeah-Miami Lakes High School, Hialeah	North Carolina State	1991 NBA draft: 2nd Rnd, 36th overall by the Orlando Magic
1986	Chris Corchiani	Hialeah-Miami Lakes High School, Hialeah	North Carolina State	1991 NBA Draft: 2nd Rnd, 36th overall by the Orlando Magic
1985	Toney Mack	Brandon High School, Brandon	Georgia	1989 NBA draft: 2nd Rnd, 54th overall by the Philadelphia 76ers
1984	Vernon Maxwell	Buchholz High School, Gainesville	Florida	1988 NBA draft: 2nd Rnd, 47th overall by the Denver Nuggets
1983	Frank Ford	Osceola High School, Kissimmee	Auburn	

== Most winners by college ==
Number	Program
9	Florida
7	Duke
6	North Carolina
4	Kentucky
3	Florida State
3	Miami
2	North Carolina State
2	Ohio State

== Most winners by high school ==
Number	High School Program
4	Lake Highland Preparatory School
3	Christopher Columbus High School
3	Miami Senior High School
3	Southeast High School
2	Hialeah-Miami Lakes High School
2	Lake Howell High School
2	NSU University School
2	Pine Crest School
