= Miodrag Vesković =

Serbian basketball coach (born 1950)

Personal information
- Born: 23 July 1950 (age 76) Sarajevo, PR BiH, FPR Yugoslavia

Career history

Coaching
- Željezničar Women
- 1990–1991: Elemes Šibenik
- 1991: SFR Yugoslavia Women
- Hemofarm Women
- 1999: FR Yugoslavia Women
- 2000–2001: Saint Petersburg Lions
- 2001–2002: Arkadia Traiskirchen
- 2003: Serbia and Montenegro Women
- 2003–2005: Lavezzini Parma
- 2007–2010: Spartak Noginsk
- 2010–2011: Serbia Women

Career highlights
- Yugoslav Women's League champion (1991)
Medals
Women's Basketball
Head coach for Yugoslavia
EuroBasket Women
Silver medal – second place	1991 Israel	Team

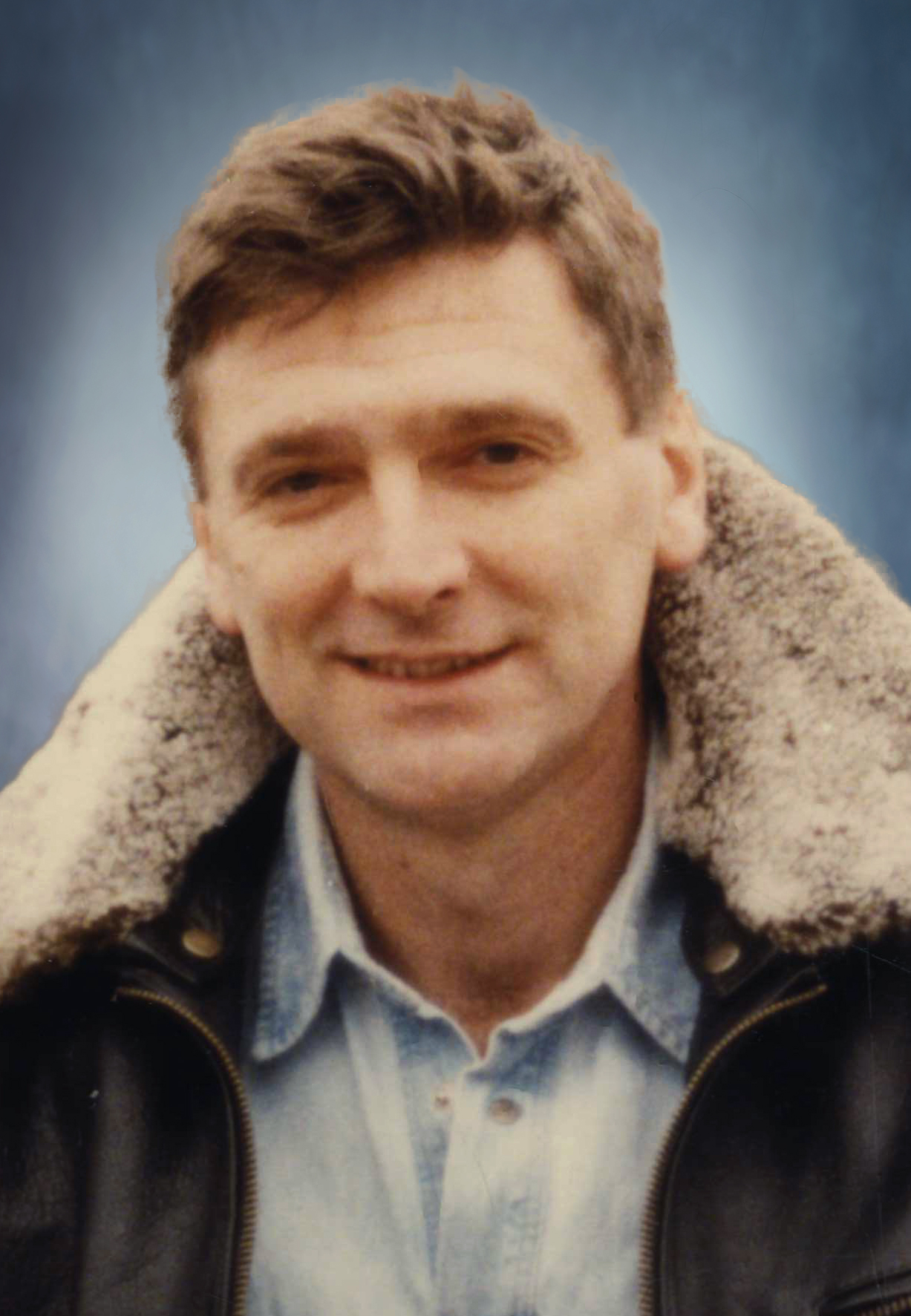
Miodrag Vesković

Miodrag Vesković (Serbian Cyrillic: Миодраг Весковић, born July 23, 1950) is a Serbian professional basketball coach.

== Coaching career ==
Vesković coached the Željezničar Sarajevo and Elemes Šibenik in the Yugoslav Women's League. With Elemes Šibenik he won the National Championship in 1990–91 season. Later, he coached Hemofarm in the Basketball League of Serbia and Montenegro, Lavezzini Parma in the Italian Serie A1 and Spartak Noginsk in the Russian Premier League.

Vesković coached men's teams such as Saint Petersburg Lions for the 2000–01 Euroleague season and Arkadia Traiskirchen in the Austrian Bundesliga.

=== National team ===
Vesković was appointed four times as the head coach for women's national team of Yugoslavia and Serbia. He coached the national team under all four state names: SFR Yugoslavia, FR Yugoslavia, Serbia and Montenegro and Serbia. He coached SFR Yugoslavia national team at the 1991 European Women Basketball Championship where he won silver medal. Vesković coached FR Yugoslavia and Serbia and Montenegro national teams at 1999 EuroBasket Women and 2003 EuroBasket Women.

== Career achievements ==
- Yugoslav Women's League champion: 1 (with Elemes Šibenik: 1990–91)
- FR Yugoslavia Women's Cup winner: 1 (with Hemofarm: 1998–99)

== Personal life ==
Vesković married Gordana Grubin (born 1972), a Serbian retired basketball player.
