= 1998 Liga Sudamericana de Básquetbol =

Liga Sudamericana de Básquetbol
- Season: 1998
- Dates: 4 February – 12 May 1998
- Teams: 16

Finals
- Champions: (Argentina) Atenas
- Runners-up: (Brazil) Cougar Franca
- Semifinalists: (Argentina) Boca Juniors (Argentina) Independiente de General Pico

The 1998 Liga Sudamericana de Básquetbol, or 1998 FIBA South American League, was the third edition of the second-tier tournament for professional basketball clubs from South America. The tournament began on 4 February 1998 and finished on 12 May 1998. Defending champions Atenas won their second title, defeating Brazilian club Cougar Franca in the Grand Finals.

== Format ==
Teams were split into four groups of four teams each, and played each other in a home-and-away round-robin format. The top two teams from each group advanced to the final stage, a best-of-three direct playoff elimination where the champion was decided.

== Participations ==
Universidad Católica finished third in Chile, but they made their debut in the competition after the runners-up Colo Colo, declined to participate.

Cordón de Montevideo, the Uruguayan Champions made their debut in the competition as the previous year they had declined the invitation. Leopardos de Bucaramanga were runners-up in Colombia, but took the place of Colombian champions, Caimanes del Llano who did not participate.

Ciudad de Loja from Ecuador were a club formed especially to represent Ecuador in the competition. ESOFAP from Lima, were runners-up in Peru, but the club made their debut in the competition as Champions Regatas Lima, refused to participate.

Report-Valtra Mogi das Cruzes finished third in Brazil but the club also made their debut in the competition, replacing the runners-up, Corinthians de Santa Cruz do Sul.

Bolivian Champions Ingavi de La Paz had played in the two previous editions.

== Teams ==
Country	Team
Argentina	Atenas
Argentina	Boca Juniors
Argentina	Independiente de General Pico
Bolivia	Ingavi de La Paz
Brazil	Marathon Franca
Brazil	Mogi das Cruzes
Chile	Universidad Católica
Chile	Universidad de Concepción
Colombia	Leopardos de Bucamaranga
Ecuador	Ciudad de Loja
Paraguay	San José
Peru	Esofa de Lima
Uruguay	Aguada
Uruguay	Cordón
Venezuela	Cocodrilos de Caracas
Venezuela	Guaiqueríes de Margarita

== Group stage ==
=== Group A ===
Pos	Team	Pld	W	L	Pts	Qualification	ATE	SAN	CON	AGU
1	(Argentina) Atenas	6	6	0	12	Advances to final stage	—	112–71	123–86	92–78
2	(Paraguay) San José	6	3	3	9	Advances to final stage	59–88	—	86–78	89–86
3	(Chile) Universidad de Concepción	6	2	4	8		71–94	85–81	—	96–90
4	(Uruguay) Aguada	6	1	5	7		81–89	86–98	99–72	—

Source: FIBA Archive

=== Group B ===
Pos	Team	Pld	W	L	Pts	Qualification	FRA	LEO	GUA	LOJ
1	(Brazil) Cougar Franca	6	6	0	12	Advances to final stage	—	116–86	139–114	147–56
2	(Colombia) Leopardos de Bucamaranga	6	3	3	9	Advances to final stage	73–87	—	110–86	93–78
3	(Venezuela) Guaiqueríes de Margarita	6	2	4	8		67–88	101–100	—	102–74
4	(Ecuador) Ciudad de Loja	6	1	5	7		71–103	71–90	100–94	—

Source: FIBA Archive

=== Group C ===
Pos	Team	Pld	W	L	Pts	Qualification	BOC	COD	UCA	ING
1	(Argentina) Boca Juniors	6	6	0	12	Advances to final stage	—	126–86	112–68	134–104
2	(Uruguay) Cordón	6	4	2	10	Advances to final stage	80–104	—	110–80	101–60
3	(Chile) Universidad Católica	6	2	4	8		101–143	84–87	—	100–96
4	(Bolivia) Ingavi de La Paz	6	0	6	6		89–114	81–100	71–104	—

Source: FIBA Archive

=== Group D ===
Pos	Team	Pld	W	L	Pts	Qualification	IND	MOG	COC	ESO
1	(Argentina) Independiente de General Pico	6	6	0	12	Advances to final stage	—	109–106	130–66	123–62
2	(Brazil) Mogi das Cruzes	6	4	2	10	Advances to final stage	88–96	—	98–77	143–85
3	(Venezuela) Cocodrilos de Caracas	6	2	4	8		96–103	69–74	—	97–61
4	(Peru) Esofa de Lima	6	0	6	6		61–96	73–99	87–127	—

Source: FIBA Archive

== Final stage ==
Quarterfinals
(Brazil) Cougar Franca	2
(Brazil) Mogi das Cruzes	0
(Argentina) Independiente de General Pico	2
(Colombia) Leopardos de Medellin	0
(Argentina) Boca Juniors	2
(Paraguay) San José	0
(Argentina) Atenas	2
(Uruguay) Cordón	0

Semifinals
(Brazil) Cougar Franca	2
(Argentina) Independiente de General Pico	1
(Argentina) Boca Juniors	1
(Argentina) Atenas	2

Grand Finals
(Brazil) Cougar Franca	0
(Argentina) Atenas	2

== Finals Series ==
The matches were played on 6 and 12 May 1998.

- Atenas - Cougar Franca 88–62
- Cougar Franca - Atenas 75-78

== Finals rosters ==
Atenas Cordoba: Marcelo Milanesio, Steve Edwards, Darrell Anderson, Fabricio Oberto, Diego Osella - Héctor Campana, Leandro Palladino. Coach: Rubén Magnano

Cougar Franca: Helinho, Demétrius Conrado Ferraciú, Chuí, Rogério Klafke, Jose Vargas - Christopher Knight. Coach: Hélio Rubens

== Season MVP ==
- (Argentina) Fabricio Oberto
