= 1992 McDonald's All-American Boys Game =

American high school basketball game

West	East
100	85
	1st half	2nd half	Total
West	50	50	100
East	40	45	85
- Date: April 19, 1992
- Venue: Alexander Memorial Coliseum, Atlanta, GA
- MVP: Othella Harrington
- Referees: 1 Richard Paparo; 2 Mike Wood; 3 Zelton Steed
- Attendance: 7,589
- Network: CBS

McDonald's All-American

The 1992 McDonald's All-American Boys Game was an All-star basketball game played on Sunday, April 19, 1992 at the Alexander Memorial Coliseum in Atlanta, Georgia. The game's rosters featured the best and most highly recruited high school boys graduating in 1992. The game was the 15th annual version of the McDonald's All-American Game first played in 1978.

== 1992 game ==
The game was telecast live by CBS. The event took place on Easter; while several players were undecided at the time of selection, only Othella Harrington had still not made a choice about his college career when the game started: Bright, Edwards, Lloyd and Wallace all committed in April, just a few days before the All-American game. Since the game was played in Atlanta, the local favorite was Carlos Strong of Athens, Georgia, one of the top-ranked recruits at the time: he had a good performance, scoring 19 points. Harrington received the MVP award after 19 points and 21 rebounds; other players who starred were Corliss Williamson, who also had a double-double with 14 points and 10 rebounds; Jason Kidd, who entertained the crowd with his passing and handling skills, ending the game with 12 points and 6 rebounds; Tony Delk, who scored 15 points; and Michael Lloyd, who scored 17. Of the 20 players, 6 went on to play at least 1 game in the NBA.

=== East roster ===
No.	Name	Height	Weight	Position	Hometown	High school	College of Choice
00	Tony Delk	6-3	189	G	Brownsville, TN, U.S.	Haywood	Kentucky
3	Rodrick Rhodes	6-6	197	F	Jersey City, NJ, U.S.	St. Anthony	Kentucky
10	Duane Simpkins	6-0	165	G	Hyattsville, MD, U.S.	DeMatha	Maryland
15	Michael Lloyd	6-2	180	G	Baltimore, MD, U.S.	Dunbar	Arkansas
22	Carlos Strong	6-8	225	F	Athens, GA, U.S.	Cedar Shoals	Georgia
23	Martice Moore	6-8	210	F	Mouth of Wilson, VA, U.S.	Oak Hill Academy	Georgia Tech
32	Steve Edwards	6-6	200	G	Miami, FL, U.S.	Miami Senior	Miami
33	Donta Bright	6-6	200	F	Baltimore, MD, U.S.	Dunbar	Massachusetts
44	John Wallace	6-8	225	F	Rochester, NY, U.S.	Greece Athena	Syracuse
55	Serge Zwikker	7-2	240	C	Potomac, MD, U.S.	Harker Prep	North Carolina

=== West roster ===
No.	Name	Height	Weight	Position	Hometown	High school	College of Choice
3	Greg Simpson	6-2	180	G	Lima, OH, U.S.	Lima Senior	Ohio State
20	Chris Collins	6-3	175	G	Northbrook, IL, U.S.	Glenbrook North	Duke
23	Richard Keene	6-5	205	G	Collinsville, IL, U.S.	Collinsville	Illinois
24	Othella Harrington	6-9	220	C	Jackson, MS, U.S.	Murrah	Undecided; Committed later to Georgetown.
32	Jason Kidd	6-4	205	G	Alameda, CA, U.S.	St. Joseph Notre Dame	California
33	Kenyon Murray	6-6	200	F	Battle Creek, MI, U.S.	Battle Creek Central	Iowa
34	Corliss Williamson	6-7	235	F	Russellville, AR, U.S.	Russellville Senior	Arkansas
35	Chris Davis	6-7	220	F	Mouth of Wilson, VA, U.S.	Oak Hill Academy	Kansas
44	Duane Spencer	6-10	190	C	New Orleans, LA, U.S.	W. L. Cohen	Georgetown
51	Charles Macon	6-8	220	F	Michigan City, IN, U.S.	Elston	Ohio State

=== Coaches ===
The East team was coached by:

- Head Coach Wendell Byrd of South Lakes High School (Reston, Virginia)

The West team was coached by:

- Head Coach Willie Boston of Westover High School (Albany, Georgia)

== All-American Week ==
=== Contest winners ===
- The 1992 Slam Dunk contest was won by Carlos Strong.
- The 1992 3-point shoot-out was won by Chris Collins.
