= Serge Zwikker =

Dutch basketball player

Personal information
- Born: April 28, 1973 (age 53) Vlaardingen, Netherlands
- Listed height: 7 ft 3 in (2.21 m)
- Listed weight: 273 lb (124 kg)

Career information
- High school: Flint Hill (Oakton, Virginia); Harker Prep (Potomac, Maryland)
- College: North Carolina (1993–1997)
- NBA draft: 1997: 2nd round, 29th overall pick
- Drafted by: Houston Rockets
- Playing career: 1997–2000
- Position: Center

Career history
- 1998–1999: TAU Ceramica
- 1999: Gorizia
- 1999–2000: CB Breogán
- 2000: Conesco Den Helder

Career highlights
- Third-team All-ACC (1997); Third-team Parade All-American (1992); McDonald's All-American (1992)
- Stats at Basketball Reference

Serge Zwikker (born April 28, 1973) is a Dutch former basketball player.

== High school career ==
Zwikker, the son of a police officer and a mother who worked in the flower business, first came to the United States in 1988, playing for Don Kent at Monsignor Clancy Memorial High School in Queens, New York. He then transferred to Flint Hill Preparatory School, and then finished his prep career at Harker Prep in Potomac, Maryland. Zwikker was a 1992 McDonald's All-American.

== College career ==
After redshirting one year, he played four years of college basketball for the University of North Carolina at Chapel Hill under coach Dean Smith. He saw limited playing time his first two years, usually coming off the bench for Rasheed Wallace. Zwikker's college career breakthrough came March 17, 1995 against Murray State University. Plagued by an ankle injury, Wallace scored only six points before Smith went to the uninjured Zwikker in relief. Zwikker went on to score 19 points as he and Jerry Stackhouse led the Tar Heels to an 80–70 win. Zwikker became the Tar Heels' starting center following Wallace's departure in the 1995 NBA draft. As a senior, he averaged 11.5 points and 8.1 rebounds per game, while serving as a team captain with Shammond Williams.

== Professional career ==
=== Houston Rockets (1997–1998) ===
Zwikker was selected by the Houston Rockets with the first pick of the second round (29th overall) in the 1997 NBA draft, and spent one season on the Rockets' bench. However, he did not record any playing time. Due to the 1998 NBA lockout, he signed a three-year contract with TAU Cerámica in Vitoria-Gasteiz, Spain.

On January 22, 1999, the Rockets renounced the rights to Zwikker.

=== Return to Europe (1998–2000) ===
Zwikker played Euroleague basketball in 1998–99, first playing for TAU Cerámica in Vitoria-Gasteiz, Spain, and then for Gorizia in Italy. After only ten games with Gorizia, his season ended due to a back injury. At the beginning of the 2000–01 season, he played three games for Conesco Den Helder in his native Netherlands.

=== National team ===
Zwikker played in the 1990 European Championship for Junior Men and later also represented the Dutch men's national team.

== Personal life ==
After his basketball career ended, Zwikker, who had earned a degree in communication, started a career in IT in the United States.
