= Steven Edwards (basketball) =

American basketball player (born 1973)

Personal information
- Born: March 1, 1973 (age 53) Miami, Florida, U.S.
- Listed height: 6 ft 5 in (1.96 m)
- Listed weight: 200 lb (91 kg)

Career information
- High school: Miami Senior (Miami, Florida)
- College: Miami (Florida) (1992–1996)
- NBA draft: 1996: undrafted
- Playing career: 1996–2008
- Position: Shooting guard / small forward

Career history
- 1996–1997: KK Žito Vardar
- 1997–1999: Atenas de Córdoba
- 1999–2000: Boca Juniors
- 2000–2001: St. Petersburg Lions
- 2001: Atenas de Córdoba
- 2001–2002: Universidad Complutense
- 2002: Cantabria Lobos
- 2002–2003: Defensor Sporting
- 2003–2008: UB La Palma

Career highlights
- 2× LNB champion (1998, 1999); Liga Sudamericana champion (1998); Big East All-Rookie team (1993); McDonald's All-American (1992); Third-team Parade All-American (1992); 2× Florida Mr. Basketball (1991, 1992)

Steven Edwards (born March 1, 1973) is an American former professional basketball player.

== High school career ==
Edwards attended Miami Senior High School, where he had a very successful career and was named Florida Mr. Basketball twice: in his junior year, when he averaged 23.5 points, 7.0 rebounds and 6.0 assists, and in his senior year, when his averages were 18.1 points, 8.0 rebounds and 5.0 assists. Edwards won 2 state championships (1990 and 1991) and was a runner-up in the 1992 tournament with Miami Senior. His performances during his high school career earned him several honors; he was selected in the Parade All-America Third Team and was the Florida Gatorade Player of the Year in 1992, and some sources ranked him among the top 10 seniors of his class. He was also selected as a McDonald's All-American: he played in the 1992 McDonald's All-American Boys Game where he wore 32, his jersey number at Miami Senior, and scored 3 points (his only made field goal being a 3-point shot).

== College career ==
Edwards decided to stay in his hometown and committed to Miami. He immediately made an impact in his freshman season, which for him was the best in many statistical categories: he started 25 games of the 27 Miami played that season, and led the Big East in 3-point field goal percentage with an average of .382. He was the top scoring freshman in the conference and had a career-high 26-points game against Pitt on January 23, 1993. He was named in the 1993 Big East All-Rookie team and was the leading scorer for the Hurricanes that season. His sophomore season saw a sharp decline in his scoring average due to a knee injury suffered during the preseason. He played less minutes and started only 11 games. The following season he could start again for the Hurricanes, was the top scorer of the team and improved his rebounding average, which went up to 4.5 per game; he also recorded a .771 free throw percentage, which was the best of his college career and among the best of the Big East (ranked 4th in the conference). He was named team co-captain for his senior season (the other being Alex Fraser), and led again the Hurricanes in scoring with a 12.9 points per game average. He finished his college career with 110 games, 91 starts, and scoring a total of 1,393 points. At the end of his career he was also the leader for 3-pointers made in Hurricanes history (he has since been surpassed and now ranks 2nd).

=== College statistics ===
Year	Team	GP	GS	MPG	FG%	3P%	FT%	RPG	APG	SPG	BPG	PPG
1992–93	Miami	27	25	29.2	.418	.382	.693	3.4	3.9	2.1	0.3	15.9
1993–94	Miami	27	11	22.7	.357	.348	.607	3.4	2.4	0.6	0.1	9.0
1994–95	Miami	28	28	29.1	.358	.328	.771	4.5	2.2	1.1	0.5	12.8
1995–96	Miami	28	27	30.2	.386	.325	.673	4.3	2.9	1.3	0.4	12.9
Career		110	91	27.8	.382	.346	.699	3.9	2.8	1.3	0.3	12.7

== Professional career ==
After the end of his senior season, Edwards was automatically eligible for the 1996 NBA draft, but he was not selected by any team. He began his professional career in Argentina and signed for Atenas de Córdoba: he was a 2-time national champion during his first 2 years at Atenas, and also won the 1998 Liga Sudamericana de Básquetbol. After a season at Boca Juniors he was part of the summer roster of the Utah Jazz in 2000 before being released in July 2000.

Edwards then moved to Europe and was part of the roster of the St. Petersburg Lions: with the Russian team he played 5 Euroleague games, averaging 13.4 points and 3.8 rebounds. After the season ended he came back to Atenas, and stayed there for one more season. He spent part of the 2001–02 season with Universidad Complutense, and in April 2002 he signed for the Cantabria Lobos, with which he played 4 games in the top level of Spanish basketball, averaging 5.5 points and 1 rebound. After a year in Uruguay he played 5 season at UB La Palma.

== Personal life ==
Edwards was born in Miami, Florida to John Benny and Laura Mae Edwards. His brothers Doug and Allen have also been basketball players: Doug played in the NBA for the Atlanta Hawks and the Vancouver Grizzlies, while Allen has played college basketball for Kentucky and went on to coaching.
