= Casey Sanders =

American basketball player (born 1979)

Personal information
- Born: October 23, 1979 (age 47)
- Listed height: 6 ft 11 in (2.11 m)
- Listed weight: 215 lb (98 kg)

Career information
- High school: Tampa Prep (Tampa, Florida)
- College: Duke (1999–2003)
- NBA draft: 2003: undrafted
- Position: Center

Career history
- 2005: Roanoke Dazzle

Career highlights
- NCAA champion (2001); USA Today All-high school basketball team (1999); Florida Mr. Basketball (1999); McDonald's All-American (1999)

Casey Sanders (born October 23, 1979) is a retired American professional basketball player better known for his high school and collegiate careers in the United States. He was the starting center in the 2001 NCAA tournament national championship game for Duke, who won the game and were crowned national champions during his sophomore season.

== Playing career ==
=== High school ===
Sanders played for Tampa Preparatory School in Tampa, Florida from 1995 to 1999. During his four-year varsity career, he scored over 2,400 points and recorded more than 500 blocks. His average of 7.0 blocks per game in one season is the second-highest average in United States high school history, while his single game (19) and career blocks totals set Florida state all-time prep records. Sanders led Tampa Prep to three consecutive state tournament appearances over his final three seasons while the team went a combined 89–10 during that span. In his senior year, Sanders averaged 22 points, 11 rebounds and 7 blocks per game; he was named Florida's Class AAA Player of the Year, Florida Mr. Basketball, and a McDonald's All-American. He also recorded 26 triple-doubles during his high school career.

=== College ===
Sanders played for Duke University between 1999 and 2003. During his freshman year he averaged 1.8 points and 1.2 rebounds per game but was part of a freshman class who averaged a collective 40.5 points per game, which at the time was the fourth-highest total by a freshman class in Atlantic Coast Conference (ACC) history. His contributions increased slightly the following year when he averaged 2.5 points, 1.8 rebounds and 0.9 blocks per game. During a home game against Maryland late in the ACC season, Duke's starting center Carlos Boozer broke his foot, leaving the Blue Devils—an already undersized team—without a veteran "big man" heading into the NCAA Tournament. Sanders made his first career start in the ACC tournament championship game against Maryland, but his athleticism made Duke even quicker than before as they won the game. He went on to anchor Duke's defense throughout the NCAA Tournament. On April 2, 2001, the Blue Devils defeated Arizona 82–72 in the national championship game with Sanders as their starting center.

His final two seasons at Duke were not as successful. The Blue Devils did not reach beyond the Sweet 16 in either year, and Sanders' season averages were still very low for a player who came out of high school as a top recruit. In his senior year in 2002–03, he accumulated more personal fouls (102) than made field goals (58).

=== Professional ===
No team selected Sanders in the 2003 NBA draft after his college career ended. With the exception of a 31-game stint for the NBA Development League's Roanoke Dazzle in 2005, he played his entire professional career overseas. Teams he played for include LF Basket in Sweden, Panteras de Miranda in Venezuela, and Unia Tarnów in Poland.

== Personal life ==
Casey Sanders is the son of Jesse and Alice Jackson. He has two sisters and two brothers. During college he held an internship for GlaxoSmithKline, saying that he "really enjoyed [his] internship" and that "it was really good for [him]."
