= Joel Berry II =

American basketball player (born 1995)

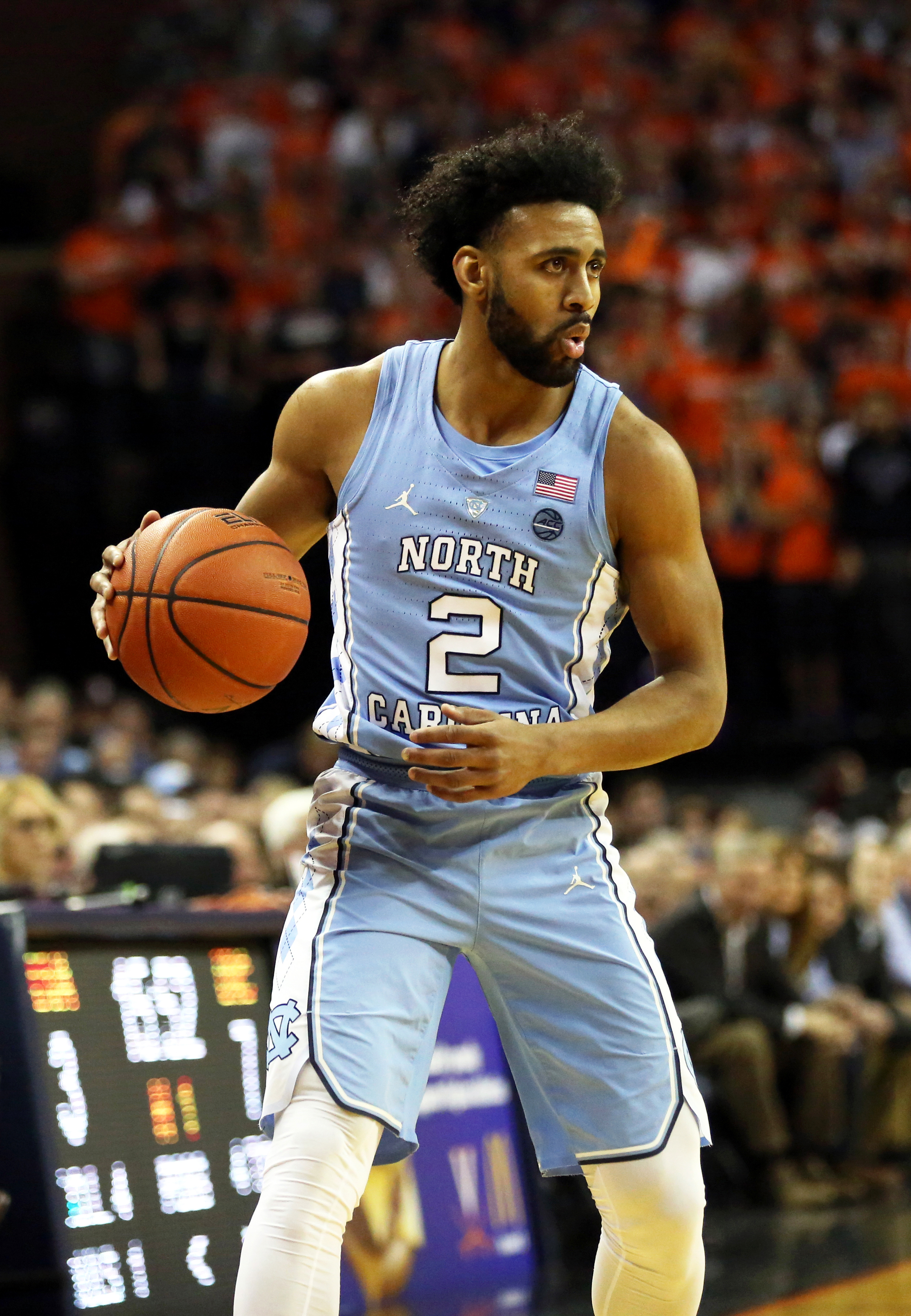
- Berry with the North Carolina Tar Heels in 2017

Personal information
- Born: April 1, 1995 (age 31) Orlando, Florida, U.S.
- Listed height: 6 ft 0 in (1.83 m)
- Listed weight: 195 lb (88 kg)

Career information
- High school: Lake Highland Preparatory (Orlando, Florida)
- College: North Carolina (2014–2018)
- NBA draft: 2018: undrafted
- Playing career: 2018–2021
- Position: Point guard
- Number: 2, 18, 21

Career history
- 2018–2019: South Bay Lakers
- 2019–2020: Greensboro Swarm
- 2020–2021: Beşiktaş

Career highlights
- NCAA champion (2017); NCAA Final Four Most Outstanding Player (2017); Third-team All-American – NABC (2018); First-team All-ACC (2018); Second-team All-ACC (2017); ACC tournament MVP (2016); No. 2 honored by North Carolina Tar Heels; McDonald's All-American (2014); First-team Parade All-American (2014); 3× Florida Mr. Basketball (2012–2014)
- Stats at Basketball Reference
Medals
Representing the United States
FIBA World U17 Championship
Gold medal – first place	2012 Lithuania	National team

Joel DeWayne Berry II (born April 1, 1995) is an American former professional basketball player. He played college basketball for the North Carolina Tar Heels and led the team to the 2017 national championship as well as two Atlantic Coast Conference (ACC) regular season and one ACC tournament championship. Berry played professionally for two seasons in the NBA G League and one season in Turkey before his retirement in 2021.

== High school career ==
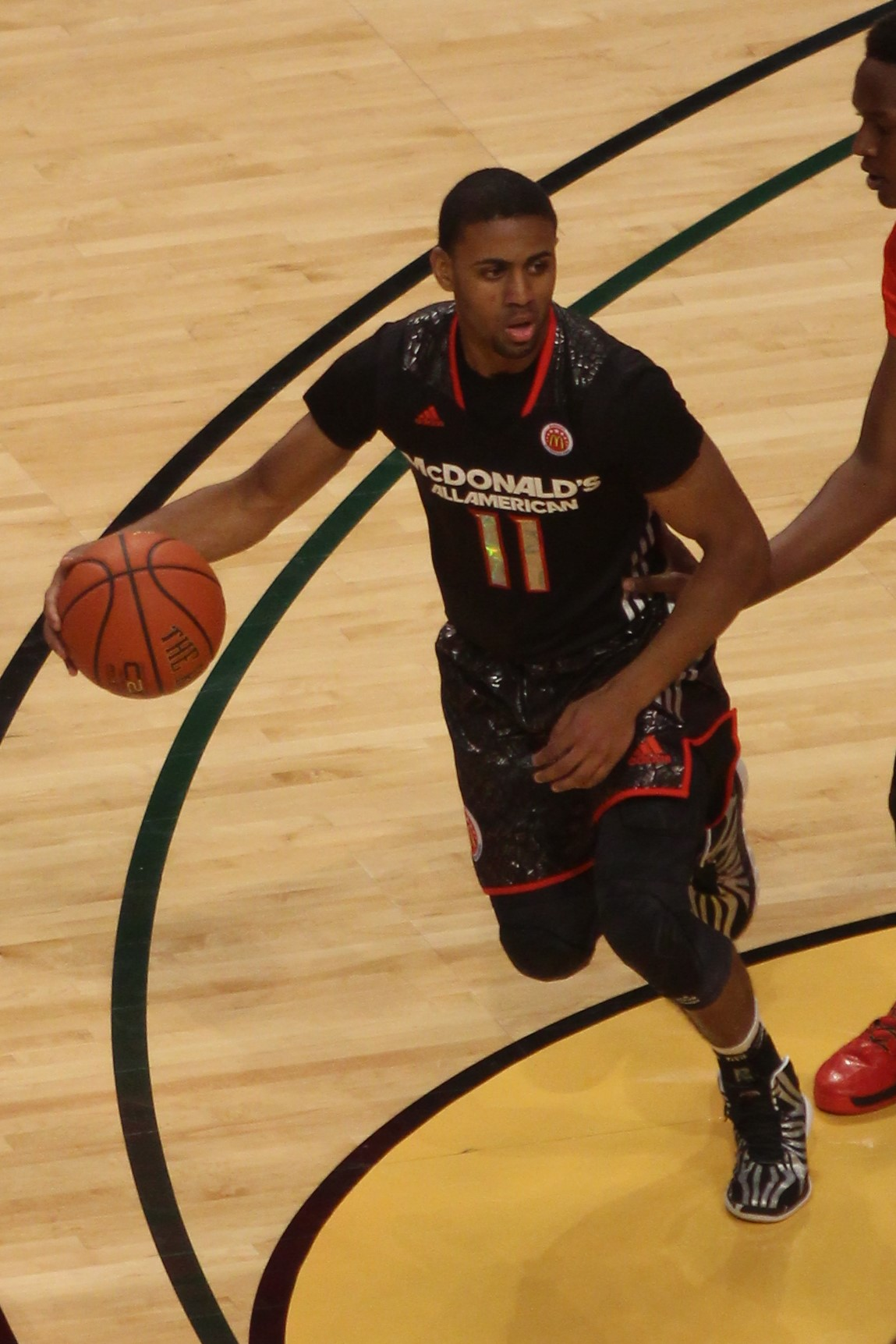
Berry during the 2014 McDonald's All-American Game

Berry, a 6'0" point guard, played high school basketball at Lake Highland Preparatory School in Orlando, Florida. He led his team to two state titles and was the first player named Florida Mr. Basketball three times. He was named a Parade All-American and McDonald's All-American as a senior in 2014.

== College career ==
=== Freshman season (2014–15) ===
Berry's freshman season was hampered by injury. He averaged 4.2 points and 1.5 assists per game backing up junior Marcus Paige at point guard.

=== Sophomore season (2015–16) ===
As a sophomore, Berry moved into the starting lineup at point guard, with Paige shifting over to shooting guard, resulting in a dramatic increase in Berry's offensive production. Berry helped the team to the 2015–16 Atlantic Coast Conference (ACC) regular season title. He then helped the team to the 2016 ACC tournament championship, averaging 17 points per game and coming away with Most Valuable Player honors. In the post-season, Berry and the Tar Heels made the Final Four and 2016 NCAA championship game. During the championship game, Berry scored 20 points and dished out four assists, but North Carolina fell short on a last-second three-pointer to Villanova, 77–74.

=== Junior season (2016–17) ===
As a junior, Berry led the Tar Heels to the 2016–17 ACC regular season title. In the NCAA Tournament, despite playing with injuries to both ankles, Berry led the Tar Heels to a 2017 NCAA men's basketball championship. In the national title game against Gonzaga, Berry scored 22 points and had six assists, and was thereafter named Most Outstanding Player of the Final Four, becoming the first player since Bill Walton to score 20 points or more in back-to-back title games. While Berry was one out of 182 players that declared early entry into the 2017 NBA draft, he ultimately decided to return to North Carolina for his senior season instead, announcing his decision on April 25, 2017.

=== Senior season (2017–18) ===
In his senior year, Berry led the Tar Heels to the ACC tournament final. Despite losing in the second round of the 2018 NCAA tournament, he averaged 17.1 points and 3.2 assists per game and had 93 three-pointers. He was named the winner of the Dean Smith Most Valuable Player award at the 2017–18 UNC men's basketball awards ceremony, and was one of eight finalists for the James E. Sullivan Award, which is presented by the Amateur Athletic Union (AAU) to the top amateur athlete in the United States. He was also voted a third team All-American by the National Association of Basketball Coaches (NABC). Berry earned this distinction just two weeks after being named a 2018 first team All-ACC selection.

== Professional career ==
=== South Bay Lakers (2018–2019) ===
After going undrafted in the 2018 NBA draft, Berry played with the Los Angeles Lakers' Summer League team, and they signed him to an NBA contract afterwards. On October 8, 2018, he was waived by the Lakers after appearing in three pre-season games. He was subsequently signed by the Lakers' G League affiliate, the South Bay Lakers. On March 2, 2019, Berry was removed from the active roster by the Lakers due to a season-ending injury.

=== Greensboro Swarm (2019–2020) ===
The Greensboro Swarm, the NBA G League affiliate of the Charlotte Hornets, on September 27, 2019, acquired the rights to Berry in a trade with the South Bay Lakers (Los Angeles Lakers affiliate). In return, the Swarm sent its second-round selection in the 2019 NBA G League draft (No. 40 overall) to South Bay. On March 6, 2020, Berry scored a career-high 44 points on 17-for-29 shooting from the field and 8-for-15 from three to go along with two assists and three rebounds in the Greensboro Swarm's 134–129 loss to the Erie Bayhawks.

=== Beşiktaş (2020–2021) ===
On November 24, 2020, Berry signed with Beşiktaş of the Basketball Super League (BSL). On August 4, 2021, Berry was added to the Charlotte Hornets Summer League roster. On August 24, 2021, Berry announced his retirement from professional basketball on the "Ceiling is the Roof" podcast.

== Post-playing career ==
On October 12, 2021, Berry joined ACC Network as a college basketball studio analyst on the show Nothing but Net.

== Career statistics ==
Legend
GP	Games played	GS	Games started	MPG	Minutes per game
FG%	Field goal percentage	3P%	3-point field goal percentage	FT%	Free throw percentage
RPG	Rebounds per game	APG	Assists per game	SPG	Steals per game
BPG	Blocks per game	PPG	Points per game	**Bold**	Career high

=== Professional ===
Year	Team	League	GP	MPG	FG%	3P%	FT%	RPG	APG	SPG	BPG	PPG
2018–19	South Bay Lakers	NBA G League	21	22.4	.391	.272	.800	1.3	2.5	.6	.3	11.1
2019–20	Greensboro Swarm	NBA G League	34	17.4	.425	.325	.700	2.1	2.1	1	.2	8.0
2020–21	Beşiktaş	Basketball Super League	26	23.3	.420	.365	.854	1.7	3.3	1.1	.0	9.2

=== College ===
Year	Team	GP	GS	MPG	FG%	3P%	FT%	RPG	APG	SPG	BPG	PPG
2014–15	North Carolina	30	0	13.2	.404	.354	.757	.9	1.5	.4	0	4.8
2015–16	North Carolina	**40**	**39**	30.7	**.448**	.376	.872	3.3	**3.8**	**1.5**	.2	13.4
2016–17	North Carolina	38	37	30.4	.426	**.383**	.774	3.1	3.6	1.4	.1	14.7
2017–18	North Carolina	36	36	**33.1**	.396	.344	**.893**	**3.5**	3.2	1.2	**.3**	**17.1**
Career		144	112	27.6	.420	.365	.834	2.8	3.1	1.1	.2	12.7
