= Saint Petersburg Lions =

- Founded: 2000
- Folded: 2001
- Arena: Yubileyny Sports Palace
- Capacity: 7,700
- Location: Saint Petersburg, Russia
- Team colors: Green and white
- President: Luciano Capicchioni
- Head coach: Miodrag Vesković
Home	Away

Saint Petersburg Lions was a professional basketball team in Saint Petersburg, Russia. The team was created in 2000 by a consortium of Italian and Swiss sponsors at the lead of Interperformances basketball agency. They were banned by the Russian Basketball Federation due to their participation in the newly created Euroleague run by Euroleague Basketball Company during the 2000-01 season. The Russian federation had agreed to send its representatives to the SuproLeague, run by FIBA Europe. When the merger of the two competitions the following year occurred, the Lions were dissolved.

== Roster ==
The roster of the Lions in their only season included:

- Sergei Bazarevich
- Steven Edwards
- Derek Hamilton
- Keith Jennings
- Marijan Kraljević
- Stjepan Stazić
- Evgeny Kisurin
- Head coach: Miodrag Vesković
