= Derreck Hamilton =

American basketball player (born 1966)

Personal information
- Born: May 20, 1966 (age 60) Mobile, Alabama, U.S.
- Listed height: 6 ft 7 in (2.01 m)
- Listed weight: 225 lb (102 kg)

Career information
- High school: B.C. Rain (Mobile, Alabama)
- College: Southern Miss (1984–1988)
- NBA draft: 1988: 3rd round, 52nd overall pick
- Drafted by: New Jersey Nets
- Playing career: 1988–2004
- Position: Small forward

Career history
- 1988: Miami Tropics
- 1989: Hapoel Tel Aviv
- 1989–1991: FC Cartagena CB
- 1990: Pepsi Mega Hotshots
- 1991–1992: Sporting Athens
- 1992–1993: AEK
- 1993: Apollon Patras
- 1993–1994: Hapoel Givatayim
- 1994: Sporting Athens
- 1995: RUS Mariembourg
- 1995–1996: Alaska Aces
- 1996-1997: Hapoel Holon
- 1997–1998: Hapoel Eliat
- 1998: Olimpija Ljubljana.
- 1998–2000: Hapoel Jerusalem
- 2000: Saint Petersburg Lions
- 2000–2001: Irakleio
- 2001–2002: Varese
- 2002: Dynamo Moscow
- 2003: Basket Rimini Crabs
- 2003–2004: Maccabi Habik'a

Career highlights
- All-EuroLeague First Team (2001); Greek League All-Star (1991)
- Stats at Basketball Reference

Derreck Lamont Hamilton (born May 20, 1966) is an American former professional basketball player. He played college basketball at the University of Southern Mississippi in the late 1980s. Hamilton was drafted by the New Jersey Nets in the third round of the 1988 NBA draft but was not signed to a contract. He would later play for several teams in Europe.

== Professional career ==
Hamilton was drafted by the New Jersey Nets in the third round of the 1988 NBA draft but did not sign a contract with them. Despite not making the NBA, Hamilton had a long career in European leagues. He had a notable career in the Greek League playing for Sporting, AEK Athens, Apollon Patras and Irakleio. He also played in the Spanish second division, with Proexinca CB Cartagena for two seasons and in the Israeli League with Hapoel Jerusalem, where he was nicknamed "The Glue", due to his tremendous contribution to team chemistry.

Prior to that, he also played with the Israeli clubs Hapoel Holon and Hapoel Eilat. He played at the end of his career in Europe with the Russian Super League club Dynamo Moscow.

== Personal life ==
Hamilton is the cousin of former Duke basketball player Antonio Lang, who won 2 NCAA titles and had playing stints in the NBA, CBA and overseas, before embarking into coaching; He is also the older brother of Angelo Hamilton, who led Connors State College to the 1990 NJCAA national title, and later played at the University of Oklahoma, before embarking on stints overseas and with the Continental Basketball Association. His son Kyle Hamilton is a safety for the Baltimore Ravens of the NFL.
