= Tampa Preparatory School =

Private school in Tampa, Florida, US

Location
- 727 West Cass Street; Tampa, Florida 33606; United States; 27°57′4″N 82°28′5″W

Information
- Type: Private, middle and high college-preparatory school
- Motto: More than just a college preparatory school... a preparation for life with a higher purpose than self
- Established: 1974
- Head of school: Kevin M. Plummer
- Grades: 6–12
- Gender: Co-educational
- Colors: Red and Gold
- Athletics conference: FHSAA
- Accreditation: Southern Association of Colleges and Schools
- Website: www.tampaprep.org

Tampa Preparatory School is a 6–12 private, co-educational middle and high college-preparatory school in Tampa, Florida, United States. It was established in 1974.

The school is accredited by the Southern Association of Colleges and Schools and the Florida Council of Independent Schools, and is a member of the National Association of Independent Schools, the College Board, the Secondary School Admissions Test Board, the National Association of College Admissions Counseling, the Southern Association of College Admissions Counseling, and the Educational Records Bureau.

== History ==
Tampa Preparatory School was established in 1974, with George Wolfenden as Headmaster. Joe Wandke was the Headmaster at the School from 1979 to 1983, before he left for Pebble Beach, California, to become president at the Robert Louis Stevenson School until 2015. In 1991 the seventh and eighth grades were added, and in 1997 the sixth grade was added. In 2002 the school moved to its new site across the street from the University of Tampa, whose campus it once shared.

== Campus ==
The school's 11.2-acre (45,000 m^{2}) campus includes a 150,000-square-foot (14,000 m^{2}) school complex including a 32,000-square-foot (3,000 m^{2}) sports complex. Both the muddle and uppers school’s feature Active Learning Environments (ALEs). The Peifer Library houses over 12,000 books and periodicals. Tampa Preparatory School opened a new Student Center in January 2013. In May 2023, Tampa Preparatory School began constructing the Genshaft & Greenbaum Building of Learning & Discovery (BOLD), a four-story complex set to become the central hub of the campus by late fall 2024.

== Athletics ==
Tampa Prep is a member of the Florida High School Athletic Association and fields teams in sports including lacrosse, baseball, bowling, cross-country, swimming and diving, crew, volleyball, soccer, basketball, track and field, golf, tennis, wrestling, and softball.

== Notable alumni ==
- Jay Bowie, professional basketball player
- Santiago Castañeda, professional soccer player
- Chris Colwill, U.S. Olympic diver
- Casey Sanders, professional basketball player
