= Sergei Bazarevich =

Russian basketball player and coach (born 1964

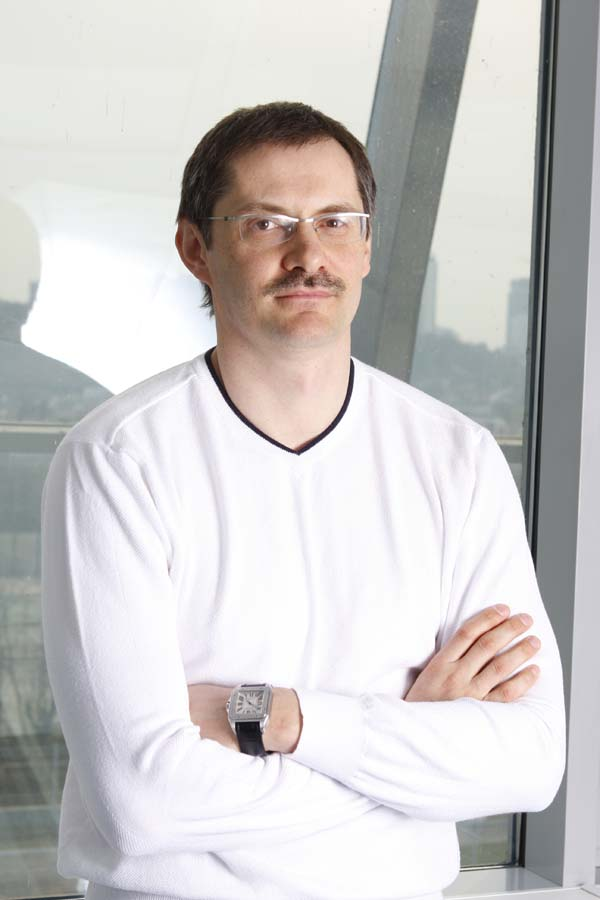

BC Samara
- Title: Head coach
- League: VTB United League

Personal information
- Born: March 16, 1965 (age 61) Moscow, Russian SFSR, Soviet Union
- Listed height: 191 cm (6 ft 3 in)
- Listed weight: 79 kg (174 lb)

Career information
- NBA draft: 1987: undrafted
- Playing career: 1983–2003
- Position: Point guard / shooting guard
- Number: 5
- Coaching career: 2001–present

Career history

Playing
- 1983–1988: CSKA Moscow
- 1988–1992: Dynamo Moscow
- 1992: CSKA Moscow
- 1992–1993: Yıldırımspor
- 1993–1994: Tofaş S.K.
- 1994: Atlanta Hawks
- 1995: Caceres
- 1995–1996: Dynamo Moscow
- 1996–1997: CSKA Moscow
- 1997–1998: Türk Telekom
- 1998: CSKA Moscow
- 1999: Gorizia
- 1999–2000: PAOK Thessaloniki
- 2000–2001: St. Petersburg Lions
- 2001: Coop Nordest Trieste
- 2001–2003: Dynamo Moscow

Coaching
- 2001–2003: Dynamo Moscow
- 2004–2005: CSKA Moscow (Juniors)
- 2005–2006: VVS Samara
- 2007–2009: Dynamo Moscow (assistant)
- 2009–2011: Dynamo Moscow
- 2011–2014: Krasnye Krylia
- 2014–2015: Lokomotiv Kuban
- 2015–2016: Pallacanestro Cantù
- 2016–2017: Trabzonspor Medical Park
- 2016–2021: Russia
- 2022–present: Samara

Career highlights
- As player: 3× FIBA European Selection (1991, 1995, 1996); 2× FIBA EuroStar (1996, 1997); 3× USSR League champion (1983, 1984, 1988); 2× Russian Championship champion (1997, 1998); Honored Master of Sports of Russia (1994); As head coach: FIBA EuroChallenge champion (2013); 2× Russian Cup winner (2012, 2013)
- Stats at NBA.com
- Stats at Basketball Reference
Medals
Men's basketball
Representing Soviet Union
FIBA World Cup
Silver medal – second place	1990 Argentina
European U-18 Championship
Gold medal – first place	1984 Sweden	Under-18
Summer Universiade
Gold medal – first place	1985 Japan
Representing Russia
FIBA World Cup
Silver medal – second place	1994 Canada
EuroBasket
Silver medal – second place	1993 Germany

Sergei Valerianovich Bazarevich (Russian: Сергей Валерьянович Базаревич; born 16 March 1965) is a Russian basketball coach and former basketball player. At 191 cm (6 ft 3 in) and 79 kg (174 lb), he played at the point guard and shooting guard positions.

Bazarevich was a regular member of the senior Russian national basketball team, with whom he won silver medals at the EuroBasket 1993 and the 1994 FIBA World Championship. He was named to the All-Tournament Team in both competitions. He also holds Greek citizenship, under the name Sergei Bazarevits (Greek: Σεργκέι Μπαζάρεβιτς).

He was the head coach of the Russian national team from 2016 to 2021.

== Professional career ==
Bazarevich started his career with in 1983, with CSKA Moscow, in the USSR League. With CSKA, he won 3 USSR League championships, in the years 1983, 1984, and 1988. He then moved to the USSR League club Dynamo Moscow in 1988.

He was a member of the FIBA European Selection in 1991. In 1992, he moved to the Turkish League club Yıldırımspor, and in 1993, he joined the Turkish League club Tofas Bursa.

After an impressive performance at the 1994 FIBA World Championship, where he finished second to Shaquille O'Neal in MVP balloting, Bazarevich signed with the NBA's Atlanta Hawks, for the 1994–95 season. He was released by the Hawks on 15 December after averaging 3.0 points and 1.4 assists in 10 games.

After being released by the Hawks, he signed with the Spanish League club Caceres Club Baloncesto. He was also a member of the FIBA European Selection in 1995 and 1996.

He moved back to Dynamo Moscow for the 1995–96 season, and then back to CSKA Moscow. He was also a two time FIBA EuroStar selection, in 1996 and 1997. While a member of CSKA, he won two Russian Championships, in the years 1997 and 1998.

He also played with the Turkish League club Türk Telekom, the Italian League club Pallacanestro Gorizia, the Greek League club PAOK Thessaloniki, the EuroLeague club St. Petersburg Lions, and the Italian League club Pallacanestro Trieste, before finally returning once again to Dynamo Moscow.

== National team career ==
Bazarevich was a member of the junior national teams of the Soviet Union. He played with the Soviet Union's junior national team at the 1984 FIBA Europe Under-18 Championship, where he won the gold medal. He also represented the Soviet Union at the 1985 Summer Universiade, where he also won a gold medal.

He was also a member of the senior men's Soviet Union national team. He played at the 1990 FIBA World Championship, where he won the silver medal.

After the Soviet Union broke up, Bazarevich represented Russia. He played with the senior men's Russian national team at the FIBA EuroBasket 1993, where he won a silver medal, and at the 1994 FIBA World Championship, where he won another silver medal. He was named to the All-Tournament Team in both competitions.

He also represented Russia at the EuroBasket 1995. In addition to this, he was also a member of the CIS Olympic team at the 1992 Summer Olympics and the Russian Olympic team at the 2000 Summer Olympics.

== Awards and accomplishments ==
=== Pro clubs ===
- 3× USSR League Champion: (1983, 1984, 1988)
- 3× FIBA European Selection: (1991, 1995, 1996)
- 2× FIBA EuroStar: (1996, 1997)
- 2× Russian Championship Champion: (1997, 1998)

=== Soviet junior national team ===
- 1984 FIBA Europe Under-18 Championship: Gold
- 1985 Summer Universiade: Gold

=== Soviet senior national team ===
- 1990 FIBA World Championship: Silver

=== Russian senior national team ===
- 1993 EuroBasket: Silver
- 1993 EuroBasket: All-Tournament Team
- 1994 FIBA World Championship: Silver
- 1994 FIBA World Championship: All-Tournament Team
- Honored Master of Sports of Russia: (1994)

=== Pro clubs ===
- 2× Russian Cup Winner: (2012, 2013)
- FIBA EuroChallenge Champion: (2013)

== NBA career statistics ==
Legend
GP	Games played	GS	Games started	MPG	Minutes per game
FG%	Field goal percentage	3P%	3-point field goal percentage	FT%	Free throw percentage
RPG	Rebounds per game	APG	Assists per game	SPG	Steals per game
BPG	Blocks per game	PPG	Points per game	**Bold**	Career high

=== Regular season ===
Year	Team	GP	GS	MPG	FG%	3P%	FT%	RPG	APG	SPG	BPG	PPG
1994–95	Atlanta	10	0	7.4	.500	.167	.778	0.7	1.4	.1	.1	3.0
Career		10	0	7.4	.500	.167	.778	0.7	1.4	.1	.1	3.0
