= 2000–01 Euroleague =

Sports season

- Season: 2000–01
- Teams: 24

Finals
- Champions: (Italy) Kinder Bologna (2nd title)
- Runners-up: (Spain) Tau Cerámica
- Finals MVP: (Argentina) Manu Ginóbili

Awards
- Regular Season MVP: (Federal Republic of Yugoslavia) Dejan Tomašević

Statistical leaders
Points	(United States) Alphonso Ford	26.0
Rebounds	(Federal Republic of Yugoslavia) Dejan Tomašević	11.5
Assists	(Croatia) Ivica Marić	5.9
Index Rating	(Federal Republic of Yugoslavia) Dejan Tomašević	30.9

The 2000–01 ULEB Euroleague was the inaugural basketball season of the EuroLeague, under ULEB and its newly formed Euroleague Basketball Company authority. Overall it was the 44th season of the premier competition for European men's professional basketball clubs overall. Initially it was not recognised or sanctioned by FIBA and considered a breakaway competition. It started on October 16, 2000, with a regular season game between hosts Real Madrid Teka and Olympiacos, which was held at the Raimundo Saporta Pavilion, in Madrid, Spain, and it ended with the last championship finals game on May 10, 2001, which was held at the PalaMalaguti arena, in Bologna, Italy.

This season did not feature all of the top-tier level European club basketball teams, as some of them opted to compete in the 2000–01 FIBA SuproLeague competition instead, after the row erupted between the previous EuroLeague governing body, FIBA, and the newly established Euroleague Basketball Company. It was the first time in European basketball that several clubs did not qualify to a European competition based on performance, but instead wild cards were given. Top clubs also signed licences with the right to participate in upcoming seasons regardless of their domestic league ranking.

A total of 24 teams competed for the EuroLeague title, which was ultimately won by Kinder Bologna. Dejan Tomašević was the EuroLeague Regular Season MVP, and Manu Ginóbili was the Finals MVP.

== European Champions' Cup teams divided ==
The FIBA European Champions' Cup was originally established by FIBA and it operated under its umbrella from 1958 until the summer of 2000, concluding with the 1999–2000 season. Euroleague Basketball Company was created by ULEB clubs in 2000. At the time the leagues of ULEB were Spain, Italy, Greece, Belgium, Portugal, England and Switzerland. However against the will of their domestic leagues clubs from Lithuania, Croatia, Russia, Israel and Slovenia opted for the Euroleague competition despite the fact that their leagues were not members of ULEB.

FIBA had never trademarked the "EuroLeague" name and had no legal recourse on the usage of that name, so they had to find a new name for their league. The following 2000–01 season started with two top European professional club basketball competitions: FIBA SuproLeague (renamed from the FIBA EuroLeague) and Euroleague.

Top clubs were split between the two leagues: Panathinaikos, Maccabi Elite Tel Aviv, CSKA Moscow, and Efes Pilsen stayed with FIBA, while Olympiacos, Kinder Bologna, Real Madrid, FC Barcelona, Tau Cerámica, and Benetton Treviso joined Euroleague Basketball. Lugano Tigers the Swiss champions were the last team to join the ULEB side and enter the competition.

== Rules, format changes and dates ==
On 11 July 2000 in Thessaloniki during the ULEB Assembly format changes and dates were set for the new competition The Official List of the teams will include a minimum of 12 and a maximum of 16 players. Ten players will be allowed on the bench while 2 USA players per team are permitted. There was no Final Four but a best of three series in the Final.

Andrea Bassani (ex-General Manager of the Italian League) was appointed in the Assembly as the Manager of Marketing and Media of the Euroleague.

=== Referees ===
Kostas Rigas was elected commissioner. Three referees will officiate every Euroleague game. The team of officials will be made up of 45 referees who have signed guaranteed contracts for three years with no age restriction. However FIBA did not allow them to officiate in their domestic leagues in 2000-01.

=== Dates ===
Games will be played on Thursdays, with the possibility of moving them forward to Wednesday when necessary.

- Regular season: 19 October 2000 to 8 January 2001
- Play-offs 1/8 finals- 1,8,15 February 2001
- Play-offs ¼ finals: 22 Feb, 1, 8 March 2001
- Semi-finals: 27, 29 March, 3, 5, 12 April 2001
- Finals: 17, 19 April, 1, 3, 10 May 2001

== Team allocation ==
A total of 24 teams from 14 countries participate in the competition.

=== Distribution ===
The table below shows the default access list.

	Teams entering in this round	Teams advancing from previous round
Regular season (24 teams)	4 best-placed teams from: Greece; Italy; Spain; 2 best-placed teams from Croatia; 1 best-placed teams from: Belgium; Germany; Great Britain; Lithuania; Portugal; Slovenia; Switzerland; Yugoslavia; 2 Wild cards	
Playoffs (16 teams)		4 group winners from the regular season; 4 group runners-up from the regular season; 4 group third-placed teams from the regular season; 4 group fourth-placed teams from the regular season

The competition culminated in a best 3 out of 5 playoff series.

=== Teams ===
The labels in the parentheses show how each team qualified for the place of its starting round

- 1st, 2nd, etc.: League position after Playoffs
- WC: Wild card

Regular season
(Greece) PAOK (2nd)	(Italy) Kinder Bologna (3rd)	(Croatia) Cibona VIP (1st)	(Lithuania) Žalgiris (2nd)
(Greece) Olympiacos (3rd)	(Italy) Müller Verona (4th)	(Croatia) Zadar (2nd)	(Portugal) Ovarense Aerosoles (1st)
(Greece) AEK (4th)	(Spain) Real Madrid Teka (1st)	(Belgium) Spirou Charleroi (4th)	(Russia) Saint Petersburg Lions (WC)
(Greece) Peristeri (5th)	(Spain) FC Barcelona (2nd)	(Germany) Opel Skyliners (3rd)	(Slovenia) Union Olimpija (3rd)
(Italy) Paf Wennington Bologna (1st)	(Spain) Adecco Estudiantes (3rd)	(United Kingdom) Haribo London Towers (1st)	(Switzerland) Lugano Snakes (1st)
(Italy) Benetton Treviso (2nd)	(Spain) Tau Cerámica (4th)	(Israel) Hapoel Jerusalem (WC)	(Federal Republic of Yugoslavia) Budućnost (1st)

== Regular season ==
The first phase was a regular season, in which the competing teams were drawn into four groups, each containing six teams. Each team played every other team in its group at home and away, resulting in 10 games for each team in the first stage. The top 4 teams in each group advanced to the next round, The Top 16. The complete list of tiebreakers is provided in the lead-in to the Regular Season results.

If one or more clubs were level on won-lost record, tiebreakers were applied in the following order:

1. Head-to-head record in matches between the tied clubs
2. Overall point difference in games between the tied clubs
3. Overall point difference in all group matches (first tiebreaker if tied clubs were not in the same group)
4. Points scored in all group matches
5. Sum of quotients of points scored and points allowed in each group match

=== Group A ===
Pos	Team	Pld	W	L	PF	PA	PD	Qualification	(Italy) PAF	(Greece) PER	(Lithuania) ZAL	(Spain) EST	(Switzerland) LUG	(Croatia) ZAD
1	(Italy) Paf Wennington Bologna	10	8	2	812	760	+52	Advance to Playoffs	—	71–69	91–85	81–72	81–66	81–77
2	(Greece) Peristeri	10	7	3	841	786	+55	Advance to Playoffs	83–70	—	74–92	91–81	85–68	92–73
3	(Lithuania) Žalgiris	10	6	4	866	816	+50	Advance to Playoffs	73–56	86–73	—	77–80	105–89	97–85
4	(Spain) Adecco Estudiantes	10	4	6	820	821	−1	Advance to Playoffs	76–90	86–91	87–77	—	97–76	93–81
5	(Switzerland) Lugano Snakes	10	3	7	777	914	−137		72–100	80–91	95–87	77–76	—	75–74
6	(Croatia) Zadar	10	2	8	840	859	−19		87–91	79–92	86–87	80–72	118–79	—

Source: Euroleague

=== Group B ===
Pos	Team	Pld	W	L	PF	PA	PD	Qualification	(Italy) KIN	(Greece) AEK	(Spain) TAU	(Croatia) CIB	(Russia) SPL	(Belgium) SPI
1	(Italy) Kinder Bologna	10	9	1	835	734	+101	Advance to Playoffs	—	81–66	76–73	106–88	84–78	106–87
2	(Greece) AEK	10	8	2	805	746	+59	Advance to Playoffs	78–77	—	64–52	83–75	84–73	97–73
3	(Spain) Tau Cerámica	10	6	4	749	700	+49	Advance to Playoffs	59–65	85–65	—	92–66	97–88	76–64
4	(Croatia) Cibona	10	3	7	773	832	−59	Advance to Playoffs	69–74	72–81	62–60	—	75–70	85–70
5	(Russia) Saint Petersburg Lions	10	2	8	778	840	−62		78–82	69–90	79–81	92–90	—	83–77
6	(Belgium) Spirou Charleroi	10	2	8	769	857	−88		58–80	89–97	71–74	100–91	80–68	—

Source: Euroleague

=== Group C ===
Pos	Team	Pld	W	L	PF	PA	PD	Qualification	(Greece) OLY	(Spain) RMB	(Slovenia) UOL	(Italy) BEN	(Israel) JER	(Portugal) OVA
1	(Greece) Olympiacos	10	7	3	861	738	+123	Advance to Playoffs	—	91–84	82–70	82–73	102–69	101–67
2	(Spain) Real Madrid Teka	10	7	3	859	789	+70	Advance to Playoffs	75–73	—	82–70	64–75	104–64	116–94
3	(Slovenia) Union Olimpija	10	7	3	823	752	+71	Advance to Playoffs	69–73	88–79	—	78–74	95–68	102–79
4	(Italy) Benetton Treviso	10	6	4	847	777	+70	Advance to Playoffs	95–87	87–88	69–71	—	78–71	106–81
5	(Israel) Hapoel Jerusalem	10	3	7	784	881	−97		83–70	74–87	76–88	79–104	—	106–71
6	(Portugal) Ovarense Aerosoles	10	0	10	746	983	−237		53–100	73–80	70–92	76–86	82–94	—

Source: Euroleague

=== Group D ===
Pos	Team	Pld	W	L	PF	PA	PD	Qualification	(Spain) FCB	(Greece) PAO	(Federal Republic of Yugoslavia) POD	(Italy) VER	(United Kingdom) LON	(Germany) SKY
1	(Spain) FC Barcelona	10	8	2	856	757	+99	Advance to Playoffs	—	58–67	92–75	96–84	82–76	86–60
2	(Greece) PAOK	10	7	3	846	773	+73	Advance to Playoffs	91–102	—	89–72	97–94	70–58	100–70
3	(Federal Republic of Yugoslavia) Budućnost	10	7	3	844	819	+25	Advance to Playoffs	77–85	83–71	—	77–73	101–83	79–73
4	(Italy) Müller Verona	10	6	4	920	854	+66	Advance to Playoffs	94–90	102–88	86–91	—	102–76	90–70
5	(United Kingdom) Haribo London Towers	10	1	9	775	878	−103		82–97	61–93	88–95	89–98	—	86–61
6	(Germany) Opel Skyliners	10	1	9	696	856	−160		51–68	73–80	79–94	80–97	79–76	—

Source: Euroleague

== Playoffs ==
=== Bracket ===
Teams in bold advanced to the next round. The numbers to the left of each team indicate the team's seeding, the numbers to the right indicate the result of games including result in bold of the team that won in that game, and the numbers furthest to the right indicate the number of games the team won in that round.

First Round
**A1**	**(Italy) Paf Bologna**	**76**	**75**	**2**
B4	(Croatia) Cibona	64	74	0
**C2**	**(Spain) Real Madrid Teka**	**91**	**76**	**2**
D3	(Federal Republic of Yugoslavia) Budućnost	63	62	0
**B1**	**(Italy) Kinder Bologna**	**113**	**85**	**2**
A4	(Spain) Adecco Estudiantes	70	80	0
D2	(Greece) PAOK	**75**	77	69	1
**C3**	**(Slovenia) Union Olimpija**	64	**85**	**73**	**2**
**C1**	**(Greece) Olympiacos**	**94**	**96**	**2**
D4	(Italy) Müller Verona	92	84	0
A2	(Greece) Peristeri	79	68	0
**B3**	**(Spain) Tau Cerámica**	**81**	**81**	**2**
D1	(Spain) FC Barcelona	85	82	0
**C4**	**(Italy) Benetton Treviso**	**86**	**99**	**2**
**B2**	**(Greece) AEK**	**69**	**73**	**2**
A3	(Lithuania) Žalgiris	60	71	0

QuarterFinal
**A1**	**(Italy) Paf Bologna**	**74**	57	**88**	**2**
C2	(Spain) Real Madrid Teka	68	**88**	70	1
**B1**	**(Italy) Kinder Bologna**	**80**	**81**	**2**
C3	(Slovenia) Union Olimpija	79	79	0
C1	(Greece) Olympiacos	72	76	0
**B3**	**(Spain) Tau Cerámica**	**78**	**98**	**2**
**B2**	**(Greece) AEK**	**97**	74	**71**	**2**
C4	(Italy) Benetton Treviso	89	**90**	56	1

SemiFinal
**B1**	**(Italy) Kinder Bologna**	**103**	**92**	**74**	**3**
A1	(Italy) Paf Bologna	76	84	70	0
B2	(Greece) AEK	67	65	62	0
**B3**	**(Spain) Tau Cerámica**	**70**	**90**	**76**	**3**

Final
**B1**	**(Italy) Kinder Bologna**	65	**94**	**80**	79	**82**	**3**
B3	(Spain) Tau Cerámica	**78**	73	60	**96**	74	2

=== First Round ===
In a best-of-three series the remaining 16 teams were placed against each other. The games were held between the 31st of January and the 14th of February, 2001, with the top 8 teams advancing to the Playoffs.

Team 1	Agg.	Team 2	1st leg	2nd leg	3rd leg
**Paf Bologna** (Italy)	2–0	(Croatia) Cibona	76–64	75–74	
**Kinder Bologna** (Italy)	2–0	(Spain) Adecco Estudiantes	113–70	85–80	
Peristeri (Greece)	0–2	(Spain) **Tau Cerámica**	79–81	68–81	
**AEK** (Greece)	2–0	(Lithuania) Žalgiris	69–60	73–71	
**Olympiacos** (Greece)	2–0	(Italy) Müller Verona	94–92	96–84	
FC Barcelona (Spain)	0–2	(Italy) **Benetton Treviso**	85–86	82–99	
**Real Madrid Teka** (Spain)	2–0	(Federal Republic of Yugoslavia) Budućnost	91–63	76–62	
PAOK (Greece)	1–2	(Slovenia) **Union Olimpija**	75–64	77–85	69–73

=== Quarterfinals ===
In a best-of-three series the remaining eight teams were placed against each other. The games were held between 21 February and 7 March 2001, with the top 4 teams advancing to the semifinals.

Team 1	Agg.	Team 2	1st leg	2nd leg	3rd leg
**Paf Bologna** (Italy)	2–1	(Spain) Real Madrid Teka	74–68	57–88	88–70
**Kinder Bologna** (Italy)	2–0	(Slovenia) Union Olimpija	80–79	81–79	
Olympiacos (Greece)	0–2	(Spain) **Tau Cerámica**	72–78	76–98	
**AEK** (Greece)	2–1	(Italy) Benetton Treviso	97–89	74–90	71–56

=== Semifinals ===
In a best-of-five series the remaining four teams were placed against each other. The games were held between the 27th of March and the 7th of April, 2001.

Team 1	Agg.	Team 2	1st leg	2nd leg	3rd leg	4th leg	5th leg
**Kinder Bologna** (Italy)	3–0	(Italy) Paf Wennington Bologna	103–76	92–84	74–70		
AEK (Greece)	0–3	(Spain) **Tau Cerámica**	65–90*	67–70	62–76		

- Note:The game was replayed between the second and the third game. AEK won the originally game 75-74 after overtime. Dimos Dikoudis scored the winning basket into appears. After Tau's appeal, ULEB's judge decided the replay of the game.

=== Finals ===
The culminating stage of the Euroleague season, the two remaining teams that won the semifinal series played each other in a best-of-five series.

Team 1	Agg.	Team 2	1st leg	2nd leg	3rd leg	4th leg	5th leg
**Kinder Bologna** (Italy)	3–2	(Spain) Tau Cerámica	65–78	94–73	80–60	79–96	82–74

2000–01 Euroleague Champions

**Kinder Bologna**
**2nd Title**

== Awards ==
=== Top Scorer ===
Player	Team
(United States) Alphonso Ford	(Greece) Peristeri

=== Regular season MVP ===
Player	Team
(Federal Republic of Yugoslavia) Dejan Tomašević	(Federal Republic of Yugoslavia) Budućnost

=== Finals MVP ===
Player	Team
(Argentina) Manu Ginóbili	(Italy) Kinder Bologna

=== Finals Top Scorer ===
Player	Team
(Argentina) Manu Ginóbili	(Italy) Kinder Bologna
(United States) Elmer Bennett	(Spain) Tau Cerámica
(United States) Victor Alexander	(Spain) Tau Cerámica

=== All-Euroleague First Team ===
Player	Team
(United States) Louis Bullock	(Italy) Müller Verona
(United States) Alphonso Ford	(Greece) Peristeri
(United States) Derrick Hamilton	(Russia) Saint Petersburg Lions
(Italy) Gregor Fučka	(Italy) Paf Wennington Bologna
(Federal Republic of Yugoslavia) Dejan Tomašević	(Federal Republic of Yugoslavia) Budućnost

=== All-Euroleague Second Team ===
Player	Team
(United States) Jemeil Rich	(Switzerland) Lugano Snakes
(Greece) Panagiotis Liadelis	(Greece) PAOK
(Spain) Pau Gasol	(Spain) FC Barcelona
(Greece) Ioannis Giannoulis	(Greece) PAOK
(United States) Rashard Griffith	(Italy) Kinder Bologna

=== Round MVP ===
==== Regular season ====
Week	Player	Team	PIR
1	(Greece) Panagiotis Liadelis	(Greece) PAOK	42
2	(Federal Republic of Yugoslavia) Dejan Tomašević	(Federal Republic of Yugoslavia) Budućnost	34
2	(Italy) Gianluca Basile	(Italy) Paf Wennington Bologna	34
3	(Federal Republic of Yugoslavia) Milenko Topić	(Federal Republic of Yugoslavia) Budućnost	39
4	(Federal Republic of Yugoslavia) Dejan Tomašević (2)	(Federal Republic of Yugoslavia) Budućnost	42
5	(United States) Derrick Hamilton	(Russia) St. Petersburg Lions	38
6	(Croatia) Darko Krunić	(Croatia) Zadar	39
7	(Italy) Gregor Fučka	(Italy) Paf Wennington Bologna	42
8	(United States) Kebu Stewart	(Israel) Hapoel Jerusalem	47
9	(United States) Derrick Hamilton (2)	(Russia) St. Petersburg Lions	40
10	(Argentina) Marcelo Nicola	(Italy) Benetton Treviso	36

==== Playoffs ====
Game	Player	Team	PIR
8thF G1	(United States) Alphonso Ford	(Greece) Peristeri	45
8thF G2	(Federal Republic of Yugoslavia) Dejan Tomašević (3)	(Federal Republic of Yugoslavia) Budućnost	34
8thF G2	(Croatia) Dino Rađja	(Greece) Olympiakos	34
8thF G2	(Italy) Riccardo Pittis	(Italy) Benetton Treviso	34
8thF G3	(Greece) Angelos Koronios	(Greece) PAOK	20
8thF G3	(Croatia) Emilio Kovačić	(Slovenia) Union Olimpija	20
4F G1	(Italy) Gregor Fučka (2)	(Italy) Paf Wennington Bologna	43
4F G2	(United States) Rashard Griffith	(Italy) Kinder Bologna	32
4F G3	(Italy) Carlton Myers	(Italy) Paf Wennington Bologna	45
SF G1	(Lithuania) Saulius Štombergas	(Spain) Tau Cerámica	43
SF G2	(United States) Elmer Bennett	(Spain) Tau Cerámica	33
SF G3	(Argentina) Fabricio Oberto	(Spain) Tau Cerámica	25
Final G1	(United States) Victor Alexander	(Spain) Tau Cerámica	32
Final G2	(France) Antoine Rigaudeau	(Italy) Kinder Bologna	21
Final G3	(Argentina) Manu Ginóbili	(Italy) Kinder Bologna	31
Final G4	(United States) Elmer Bennett (2)	(Spain) Tau Cerámica	28
Final G5	(United States) Rashard Griffith (2)	(Italy) Kinder Bologna	25

== Individual statistics ==
=== Rating ===
Rank	Name	Team	Games	Rating	PIR
1.	(Federal Republic of Yugoslavia) Dejan Tomašević	(Federal Republic of Yugoslavia) Budućnost	12	371	30.92
2.	(United States) Derrick Hamilton	(Russia) Saint Petersburg Lions	10	283	28.30
3.	(United States) Alphonso Ford	(Greece) Peristeri	12	305	25.42

=== Points ===
Rank	Name	Team	Games	Points	PPG
1.	(United States) Alphonso Ford	(Greece) Peristeri	12	312	26.00
2.	(Federal Republic of Yugoslavia) Dejan Tomašević	(Federal Republic of Yugoslavia) Budućnost	12	275	22.92
3.	(Greece) Panagiotis Liadelis	(Greece) PAOK	13	295	22.69

=== Rebounds ===
Rank	Name	Team	Games	Rebounds	RPG
1.	(Federal Republic of Yugoslavia) Dejan Tomašević	(Federal Republic of Yugoslavia) Budućnost	12	138	11.50
2.	(Croatia) Dino Rađa	(Greece) Olympiacos	14	137	9.79
3.	(Belgium) Ron Ellis	(Belgium) Region Wallone Spirou	10	96	9.60

=== Assists ===
Rank	Name	Team	Games	Assists	APG
1.	(Croatia) Ivica Marić	(Croatia) Zadar	10	59	5.90
2.	(United States) Elmer Bennett	(Spain) Tau Cerámica	22	120	5.45
3.	(Italy) Riccardo Pittis	(Italy) Benetton Treviso	14	54	3.86

=== Other statistics ===
Category	Player	Team	Games	Average
Steals	(Croatia) Ivica Marić	(Croatia) Zadar	10	3.70
Steals	(United States) Jemeil Rich	(Switzerland) Lugano Snakes	10	3.70
Blocks	(Ukraine) Grigorij Khizhnyak	(Lithuania) Žalgiris	12	3.17
Turnovers	(Russia) Sergei Bazarevich	(Russia) Saint Petersburg Lions	10	4.50
Fouls drawn	(Greece) Panagiotis Liadelis	(Greece) PAOK	13	7.08
Minutes	(United States) Derrick Hamilton	(Russia) Saint Petersburg Lions	10	38:35
2P%	(France) Stéphane Risacher	(Greece) Olympiacos	14	73.7%
3P%	(Argentina) Jorge Racca	(Greece) PAOK	13	59.3%
FT%	(United States) Henry Williams	(Italy) Müller Verona	12	94.7%

=== Individual game highs ===
Category	Player	Team	Statistic
PIR	(United States) Kebu Stewart	(Israel) Hapoel Jerusalem	47
Points	(Italy) Carlton Myers	(Italy) Paf Wennington Bologna	41
Points	(United States) Alphonso Ford	(Greece) Peristeri	41
Rebounds	(United States) Victor Alexander	(Spain) Tau Cerámica	19
Assists	(United States) Elmer Bennett	(Spain) Tau Cerámica	13
Steals	(Argentina) Manu Ginóbili	(Italy) Kinder Bologna	7
Steals	(Federal Republic of Yugoslavia) Bojan Bakić	(Federal Republic of Yugoslavia) Budućnost	7
Blocks	(Croatia) Stojan Vranković	(Italy) Paf Wennington Bologna	10
Three pointers	(Lithuania) Saulius Štombergas	(Spain) Tau Cerámica	9
Turnovers	(Russia) Sergei Bazarevich	(Russia) Saint Petersburg Lions	11

== Aftermath ==
In May 2001, Europe had two continental champions, Maccabi Tel Aviv of the FIBA SuproLeague and Kinder Bologna of Euroleague Basketball Company's EuroLeague. The leaders of both organizations realized the need to come up with a new single competition. Negotiating from the position of strength ULEB dictated proceedings, and FIBA essentially had no choice but to agree to their terms. As a result, the EuroLeague was fully integrated under Euroleague Basketball Company's umbrella, and teams that competed in the FIBA SuproLeague during the 2000–01 season joined it as well. It is today officially admitted that European basketball had two champions that year, Maccabi of the FIBA SuproLeague and Kinder Bologna of the Euroleague Basketball Company's EuroLeague.

A year later, Euroleague Basketball Company and FIBA decided that Euroleague Basketball's EuroLeague competition would be the main basketball tournament on the continent, to be played between the top level teams of Europe. FIBA Europe would also organize a European league for third-tier level teams, known as the FIBA Europe League competition, while Euroleague Basketball would also organize its own second-tier level league, combining FIBA's long-time Korać Cup and Saporta Cup competitions into one new competition, the EuroCup. In 2005, Euroleague Basketball and FIBA decided to cooperate with each other, and did so jointly until 2016.

In essence, the authority in European professional basketball was divided over club-country lines. FIBA stayed in charge of national team competitions (like the FIBA EuroBasket, the FIBA World Cup, and the Summer Olympics), while Euroleague Basketball took over the European professional club competitions. From that point on, FIBA's Korać Cup and Saporta Cup competitions lasted only one more season before folding and merged to the FIBA Europe Champions Cup in 2002 which was when Euroleague Basketball launched the ULEB Cup.

== See also ==
- 2000–01 FIBA SuproLeague
- 2000–01 FIBA Saporta Cup
- 2000–01 FIBA Korać Cup

== Sources ==
- 2000-01 at Eurobasket.com
- Results
