= 1996 FIBA Intercontinental Cup =

Olimpia	Panathinaikos
(Argentina)	(Greece)
1	2

First leg
Olimpia	Panathinaikos
89	83
- Date: September 4, 1996
- Venue: Claudio Newell, Rosario

Second leg
Panathinaikos	Olimpia
83	78
- Date: September 10, 1996
- Venue: Olympic Indoor Hall, Maroussi

Third leg
Olimpia	Panathinaikos
76	101
- Date: September 12, 1996
- Venue: Olympic Indoor Hall, Maroussi

The 1996 FIBA Intercontinental Cup was the 22nd edition of the FIBA Intercontinental Cup for men's professional basketball clubs and the 21st edition of the tournament being in the form of a true intercontinental tournament. It was contested through a best-of-three playoff format, in September 1996, in order to determine the world club champion. It was contested between the winners of the 1995–96 season of the FIBA European League, Panathinaikos, and Olimpia, the winners of the 1996 edition of the FIBA South American League.

The first game of the 3 game series was held on 4 September 1996, at the Estadio Cubierto Newell's Old Boys, the home arena of Olimpia. Olimpia won the first game of the series by a score of 89–83. The Olympic Indoor Hall hosted the last 2 games, on 10 September 1996, and 12 September 1996. Panathinaikos won the second and third games of the series, and became the 1996 world club champions.

== Series summary ==
Game	Date	Home team	Result	Road team
Game 1	September 4	Olimpia	89–83	Panathinaikos
Game 2	September 10	Panathinaikos	83–78	Olimpia
Game 3	September 12	Panathinaikos	101–76	Olimpia

Panathinaikos won the series 2-1.

=== Game 1 ===
September 4
2:00

Olimpia (Argentina)	89–83	(Greece) Panathinaikos
Pts: Racca 25		Pts: Amaechi 23

Estadio Cubierto Newell's Old Boys, Rosaria, Argentina
Attendance: 7,000
Referees: Juan Figueroa (PUR), José Lapaix (DOM)

Olimpia: Montecchia 6, Racca 25, Wilson 8, Jadlow 21, Uranga 7, Victoriano 12, Gutiérrez 2, Nocioni 2, Zulberti 6.

Panathinaikos: Dinkins 7, Alvertis 21, Koch 0, Amaechi 23, Martínez 8, Oikonomou 8, Georgikopoulos 0, Sconochini 16.

=== Game 2 ===
September 10
16:00

Report

Panathinaikos (Greece)	83–78	(Argentina) Olimpia
Scoring by half: 37-34, 46-44
Pts: Alvertis 30; Rebs: Amaechi 9 Asts: Dinkins 5		Pts: Victoriano 23; Rebs: Wilson 10; Asts: Victoriano 5

Olympic Indoor Hall, Maroussi, Athens
Attendance: 20,000
Referees: Wiesław Zych (POL), Danko Radić (CRO)

Panathinaikos: Dinkins 7, Sconochini 3, Alvertis 30, Oikonomou 16, Amaechi 19, Koch 8, Martínez 0.

Olimpia: Montecchia 5, Racca 11, Wilson 15, Uranga 4, Jadlow 9, Gutiérrez 5, Victoriano 23, Zulberti 0, Nocioni 6.

=== Game 3 ===
September 12
16:00

Report

Panathinaikos (Greece)	101–76	(Argentina) Olimpia de Venado Tuerto
Scoring by half: 47-40, 54-36
Pts: Dinkins 24; Rebs: Amaechi 10; Asts: Dinkins 6		Pts: Racca 28; Rebs: Uranga 7 Asts: Victoriano 3

Olympic Indoor Hall, Maroussi, Athens
Attendance: 20,000
Referees: Wiesław Zych (POL), Danko Radić (CRO)

Panathinaikos: Dinkins 24, Sconochini 12, Alvertis 8, Oikonomou 9, Amaechi 18, Koch 9, Martínez 13, Georgikopoulos 5, Skoutaris 3.

Olimpia: Montecchia 1, Racca 28, Wilson 6, Uranga 2, Jadlow 20, Gutiérrez 0, Victoriano 14, Zulberti 5, Nocioni 0, Burgos 0.

1996 FIBA Intercontinental Cup Champions

Panathinaikos
1st title

== Rosters ==
Panathinaikos	Olimpia

Panathinaikos
Pos	No.	Player
SF	4	(Greece) Fragiskos Alvertis
SG	5	(Greece) Ioannis Georgikopoulos
PG	6	(Germany) Michael Koch
PF	8	(Greece) Nikos Oikonomou
PG	9	(United States) Byron Dinkins
SG/SF	11	(Argentina) (Italy) Hugo Sconochini
F/C	13	(Spain) Ferran Martínez
SF	14	(Greece) Leonidas Skoutaris
C	15	(England) John Amaechi
PF		(Argentina) (Italy) Marcelo Nicola
Did not play
PG	10	(Greece) (United States) Jon Korfas
SG		(Greece) Vangelis Vourtzoumis
C		(Greece) Saša Marković-Theodorakis
Head coach:
(Serbia) Božidar Maljković

Olimpia de Venado Tuerto
Pos	No.	Player
SF	5	(United States) Michael Lamont Wilson
PG	6	(Argentina) (Italy) Alejandro Montecchia
PG	8	(Argentina) (Spain) Lucas Victoriano
F	10	(Argentina) Leonardo Gutiérrez
F/C	11	(Argentina) Alejandro Burgos
F/C	12	(Argentina) Sebastián Uranga
SG/SF	13	(Argentina) (Italy) Jorge Racca
F/C	15	(United States) Todd Jadlow
F		(Argentina) (Italy) Andrés Nocioni
F		(Argentina) Jorge Zulberti
Head coach:
(Argentina) Horacio Seguí
