= List of Panathinaikos B.C. notable players =

These are the list of Panathinaikos B.C. players. It also includes some current and former players of the club.

Note: Flags indicate national team eligibility at FIBA-sanctioned events. Players may hold other non-FIBA nationalities not displayed.

Criteria

To appear in this section a player must have either:

- Set a club record or won an individual award while at the club
- Played at least one official international match for their national team at any time
- Played at least one official NBA match at any time.

- (Greece) Dimitrios Agravanis
- (Greece) Fragiskos Alvertis
- (England) John Amaechi
- (Greece) Liveris Andritsos
- (Greece) Kostas Antetokounmpo
- (Greece) Thanasis Antetokounmpo
- (United States) Hilton Armstrong
- (Greece) Zach Auguste
- (Greece) Neoklis Avdalas
- (United States) Anthony Avent
- (United States) Dwayne Bacon
- (Poland) Aleksander Balcerowski
- (Greece) Georgios Balogiannis
- (United States) Marcus Banks
- (Uruguay) Esteban Batista
- (United States) Michael Batiste
- (Slovenia) Sani Bečirovič
- (Ghana) Ben Bentil
- (Latvia) Jānis Blūms
- (Greece) Lefteris Bochoridis
- (Serbia) Dejan Bodiroga
- (Greece) Nikos Boudouris
- (Greece) Ioannis Bourousis
- (Greece) Michael Bramos
- (Spain) Lorenzo Brown
- (Republic of Ireland) Pat Burke
- (Greece) Nick Calathes
- (Greece) Pat Calathes
- (Greece) Vassilis Charalampopoulos
- (Greece) Nikos Chatzivrettas
- (Greece) Fanis Christodoulou
- (United States) Ramel Curry
- (United States) Antonio Davis
- (United States) Tony Delk
- (Greece) Dimitris Diamantidis
- (Greece) Dimos Dikoudis
- (Greece) Dimitris Dimakopoulos
- (United States) Byron Dinkins
- (United States) Jeremy Evans
- (United States) Kenneth Faried
- (Puerto Rico) James Feldeine
- (Germany) Patrick Femerling
- (United States) Yogi Ferrell
- (Greece) Antonis Fotsis
- (United States) Jimmer Fredette
- (United States) Kenny Gabriel
- (South Sudan) Wenyen Gabriel
- (Greece) Nikos Galis
- (Greece) Minas Gekos
- (Italy) Alessandro Gentile
- (Italy) Ferdinando Gentile
- (Greece) Panagiotis Giannakis
- (Greece) Giannis Giannoulis
- (United States) James Gist
- (Greece) Andreas Glyniadakis
- (Slovenia) Jurica Golemac
- (United States) Jerian Grant
- (Lithuania) Marius Grigonis
- (Lithuania) Artūras Gudaitis
- (United States) Marcus Haislip
- (United States) Nigel Hayes-Davies
- (Spain) Juancho Hernangómez
- (Croatia) Mario Hezonja
- (Greece) Memos Ioannou
- (United States) Mike James
- (Greece) Vlado Janković
- (Lithuania) Šarūnas Jasikevičius
- (Lithuania) Robertas Javtokas
- (United States) Wesley Johnson
- (United States) Edgar Jones
- (Greece) Kostas Kaimakoglou
- (Greece) Georgios Kalaitzakis
- (Greece) Panagiotis Kalaitzakis
- (Greece) Georgios Kalaitzis
- (United States) Jason Kapono
- (Greece) Georgios Karagkoutis
- (Greece) Chris Kefalos
- (Germany) Michael Koch
- (Greece) Dimitris Kokolakis
- (Greece) Giorgos Kolokithas
- (Croatia) Arijan Komazec
- (Greece) Apostolos Kontos
- (Greece) Takis Koroneos
- (Greece) Jon Korfas
- (Turkey) İbrahim Kutluay
- (Serbia) Ognjen Kuzmić
- (Slovenia) Jaka Lakovič
- (United States) Keith Langford
- (Gabon) Stéphane Lasme
- (Cameroon) Paris Lee
- (Lithuania) Lukas Lekavičius
- (France) Mathias Lessort
- (Poland) David Logan
- (Belgium) Matt Lojeski
- (Greece) Michalis Lountzis
- (Lithuania) Jonas Mačiulis
- (United States) Shelvin Mack
- (United States) Daryl Macon
- (Greece) Lefteris Mantzoukas
- (Australia) Aleks Marić
- (Spain) Ferran Martínez
- (Greece) Faidon Matthaiou
- (Greece) Loukas Mavrokefalidis
- (Slovenia) Ariel McDonald
- (United States) Darryl Middleton
- (Greece) Nikos Milas
- (Greece) Kostas Missas
- (Greece) Dinos Mitoglou
- (Greece) Dimitrios Moraitis
- (Croatia) Damir Mulaomerović
- (United States) Tracy Murray
- (Greece) Christos Myriounis
- (Serbia) Nemanja Nedović
- (United States) DeMarcus Nelson
- (United States) Drew Nicholas
- (United States) Demetris Nichols
- (Argentina) Marcelo Nicola
- (United States) Kendrick Nunn
- (Nigeria) Julius Nwosu
- (Greece) Nikos Oikonomou
- (Turkey) Cedi Osman
- (United States) Andy Panko
- (Greece) Missas Pantazopoulos
- (Greece) Lazaros Papadopoulos
- (Greece) Georgios Papagiannis
- (Greece) Dimitrios Papanikolaou
- (Greece) Argiris Papapetrou
- (Greece) Ioannis Papapetrou
- (Greece) Charis Papazoglou
- (Greece) Nikos Pappas
- (Serbia) Žarko Paspalj
- (Greece) Kostas Patavoukas
- (Serbia) Aleksandar Pavlović
- (United States) Adreian Payne
- (Serbia) Miroslav Pecarski
- (Greece) Argyris Pedoulakis
- (Montenegro) Nikola Peković
- (Greece) Stratos Perperoglou
- (Greece) Kostas Politis
- (Poland) Mateusz Ponitka
- (Croatia) Nikola Prkačin
- (Croatia) Dino Rađa
- (Serbia) Željko Rebrača
- (Montenegro) Tyrese Rice
- (United States) K. C. Rivers
- (Greece) Dušan Šakota
- (United States) John Salley
- (Greece) Alexandros Samodurov
- (Argentina) Pepe Sánchez
- (Cuba) Howard Sant-Roos
- (Central African Republic) Romain Sato
- (Montenegro) Vlado Šćepanović
- (Greece) Sofoklis Schortsanitis
- (Argentina) Hugo Sconochini
- (United States) Byron Scott
- (Lebanon) Rony Seikaly
- (China) Shang Ping
- (Georgia (country)) Giorgi Shermadini
- (North Macedonia) T.J. Shorts
- (United States) Chris Singleton
- (Lithuania) Ramūnas Šiškauskas
- (Poland) A. J. Slaughter
- (Greece) Kostas Sloukas
- (Greece) Vassilis Spanoulis
- (Greece) David Stergakos
- (Estonia) Tiit Sokk
- (Serbia) Milenko Tepić
- (Greece) Nikos Rogkavopoulos
- (United States) Deshaun Thomas
- (Serbia) Dejan Tomašević
- (Greece) Kostas Tsartsaris
- (Croatia) Roko Ukić
- (Greece) George Vassilakopoulos
- (Argentina) Luca Vildoza
- (Ukraine) Alexander Volkov
- (Greece) Ian Vougioukas
- (Greece) Vangelis Vourtzoumis
- (Croatia) Stojko Vranković
- (Serbia) Miloš Vujanić
- (United States) Aaron White
- (United States) Okaro White
- (United States) Dominique Wilkins
- (United States) Derrick Williams
- (North Macedonia) Kennedy Winston
- (United States) Nate Wolters
- (Bosnia and Herzegovina) Zack Wright
- (Greece) Vassilis Xanthopoulos
- (Turkey) Ömer Yurtseven
- (Croatia) Andrija Žižić
