= Fragiskos Alvertis =

Greek basketball player

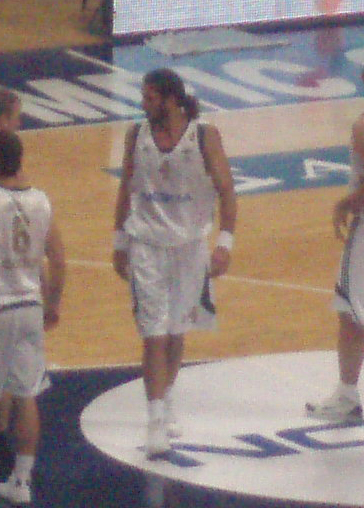
- Alvertis with Panathinaikos in 2008

Personal information
- Born: 11 June 1974 (age 52) Athens, Greece
- Listed height: 6 ft 9 in (2.06 m)
- Listed weight: 225 lb (102 kg)

Career information
- NBA draft: 1996: undrafted
- Playing career: 1990–2009
- Position: Small forward
- Number: 4
- Coaching career: 2014–2014

Career history

Playing
- 1990–2009: Panathinaikos

Coaching
- 2014: Panathinaikos

Career highlights
- As player: FIBA Intercontinental Cup champion (1996); 5× EuroLeague champion (1996, 2000, 2002, 2007, 2009); 50 Greatest EuroLeague Contributors (2008); 101 Greats of European Basketball (2018); 2× Triple Crown winner (2007, 2009); 11× Greek League champion (1998–2001, 2003–2009); 8× Greek Cup winner (1993, 1996, 2003, 2005–2009); Greek League MVP (2003); Greek Cup Finals MVP (2003); Greek Cup Finals Top Scorer (2003); 12× Greek League All-Star (1994 II, 1996 I, 1996 II, 1997, 1998, 2001–2007); Greek League All-Star Game MVP (2001); 3× Greek All-Star Game 3-Point Shootout Champion (1996 I, 1996 II, 1997); Acropolis Tournament MVP (2000); No. 4 retired by Panathinaikos (2009); Greek Basket League Hall of Fame (2022); As head coach: Greek League champion (2014); As General Manager: Greek League champion (2021); Greek Cup winner (2021); Greek Super Cup winner (2021)
Medals
Men's basketball
Representing Greece
FIBA Europe Under-16 Championship
Silver medal – second place	1991 Greece	Under-16
FIBA Europe Under-20 Championship
Silver medal – second place	1992 Greece	Under-20

Fragiskos "Frankie" Alvertis (alternate spelling: Fragkiskos, Greek: Φραγκίσκος "Φράνκι" Αλβέρτης; born 11 June 1974) is a Greek former professional basketball player and general manager of Panathinaikos Athens. As a player, he was the long-time captain of Panathinaikos, where he spent his whole professional career. In 1990, Alvertis joined Panathinaikos, after moving to the club from Glyfada. Alvertis is first on the list of the EuroLeague championships won by a player, with five, since the competition went to the Final Four format, beginning with the 1987–88 season. The former Italian player Dino Meneghin, is first overall, with seven EuroLeague championships won, when including all formats of the competition, dating back to the competition's inaugural 1958 season.

As a member of the Greens, he won eleven Greek League championships, five EuroLeague Championships, eight Greek Cup titles, and one FIBA Intercontinental Cup title. Alvertis is commonly referred to as one of the best pure shooters of European basketball during the 1990s decade, and the beginning of the new millennium. He won the Greek League Three-Point Shootout Contest three years in a row (1996 I, 1996 II, 1997), and he shot 41.0 percent from three-point range throughout his EuroLeague career.

Alvertis played in the EuroLeague Final Four for the eight and final time in 2007. On February 3, 2008, Alvertis was chosen as one of the 50 Greatest EuroLeague Contributors, over the previous half-century by the EuroLeague Basketball Experts Committee, in recognition of his major contribution to Panathinaikos' rise on the European continental scene.

Alvertis retired from playing professional club basketball, following the 2008–09 season. At the beginning of the 2009–10 season, his number 4 jersey was retired by the club. It was the first Panathinaikos basketball shirt number that the club had ever retired. The retired number 4 jersey was hung up in the rafters above the playing court of the Nikos Galis Olympic Indoor Hall, along with the club's trophy banners. In 2018, he was named one of the 101 Greats of European Basketball. He was inducted into the Greek Basket League Hall of Fame in 2022.

Alvertis was a member of the Greece men's national basketball team, from 1995 to 2004. As a member of the Greece men's national team, he made it to the FIBA World Championship semifinals in 1998, and twice made it to the EuroBasket semifinals, in 1995 and 1997.

== Club career ==
=== 1990–1996 ===
Alvertis' eventful transfer to Panathinaikos from Glyfada, cost Panathinaikos' men's water polo department, as it included the trade of the Panathinaikos Water Polo Club's main star, Dimitris Seletopoulos, in order to get Alvertis. A great deal had been accomplished for Panathinaikos in the trade however, as the years to come would demonstrate. Alvertis was indeed an intriguing prospect at the time, almost 10 cm (4 inches) taller than the conventional shooting guard. His potential was proven to be great in the 1991 FIBA Europe Under-16 Championship, where Alvertis led the Greek team to the silver medal alongside Panagiotis Liadelis. At the same time, Panathinaikos was going through a transition period during which the lackluster team of the late 1980s strove to become a European powerhouse. Consequently, young Alvertis had to wait until the 1993–94 season to get significant playing time on a team with high ambitions, as PAO reached the EuroLeague Final Four. The star of the twenty-year-old player shone right away, particularly in the Top 8 playoff series against reigning champions Limoges. Alvertis averaged 13 points per game, forcing Head Coach Božidar Maljković to state that he already was to be counted as one of the very best players in Europe.

Panathinaikos had a status to confirm in the 1994–95 season and Alvertis helped them do so by elevating his play to an even higher level. Using his sharp shooting with a rare maturity for a player his age, he was a major contributor to his team's march towards a second consecutive EuroLeague Final Four. In the Top 8 playoffs against Kinder Bologna and Predrag Danilović, he averaged 12.7 points and 3.3 rebounds, while holding Danilović to just 8 points and 4–15 from the field in the decisive Game 3. Although the semifinal against Olympiacos proved to be tough, as he only shot 1-10 from the field for only 3 points, he scored a season high 29 points in the third place game against Limoges. Alvertis finished his EuroLeague season averaging 12 points per game.

In the 1995–96 season, Alvertis saw NBA legend Dominique Wilkins join the team and the EuroLeague title seemed closer than ever. He averaged 10.8 points per game in the competition, led Panathinaikos in scoring during the winning Final against Barcelona with 17 points, and was selected to the EuroLeague All-Final Four Team. In the Greek League semifinals, Panathinaikos faced a Panionios team under Dušan Ivković, featuring the likes of Žarko Paspalj and Fanis Christodoulou. Alvertis scored 12 points in the last eight minutes of a dramatic Game 3, leading Panathinaikos to the Finals where they fell to Olympiacos. He also won the 1996 FIBA Intercontinental Cup, as he averaged 19.7 points per game against Olimpia de Venado Tuerto, who were the defending Argentine National League and FIBA South American League champions at the time.

=== 1996–2004 ===
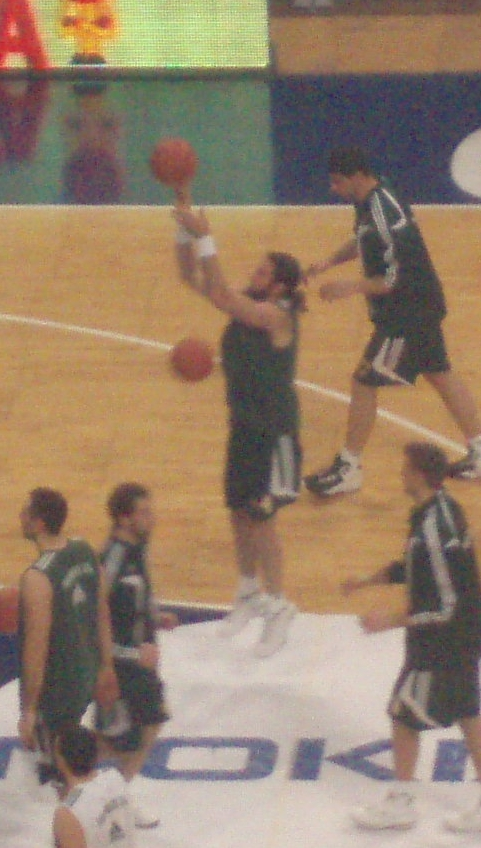
Alvertis during a shoot-around

Alvertis cemented his role as one of Panathinaikos' main stars, in spite of the fact that the team experienced a dispiriting 1996–97 season. Although he increased his scoring average to 12.7 points per game, he was unable to help PAO reach the 1997 EuroLeague Final Four as they were bested by eventual champions Olympiacos in the quarterfinal playoffs. His 35 points facing Caja San Fernando set his EuroLeague personal record. The Greek League outcome would add up to the season's drama, as Alvertis' 29 points against PAOK in Game 2 of the quarterfinal playoffs were not enough to prevent a 90–85 defeat.

Strengthened by the addition of another NBA legend in Byron Scott for the 1997–98 season, Panathinaikos won their first national league title since 1984. In the memorable semifinal playoff series, AEK was coming off of a 1998 Euroleague Finals campaign, led by the likes of Bane Prelević, Willie Anderson and Victor Alexander. Alvertis averaged 16.7 points per game and led Panathinaikos in scoring. Following the win in the final series against PAOK and Peja Stojaković, he was voted to the All-Greek League Team, alongside teammate Dino Radja.

After an unexpected failure to reach the EuroLeague Top 8 in the 1998–99 season, Alvertis won one more Greek League title. Panathinaikos beat Olympiacos in the finals, after breaking home court advantage and winning the decisive Game 5 in the Peace and Friendship Stadium.

In the 1999–00 season, having missed an important part of the season due to an injury, Alvertis still came back on time. Performing efficient basketball, he helped Panathinaikos win their second EuroLeague championship, at the 2000 Thessaloniki EuroLeague Final Four, as well as their third straight Greek League championship, downing PAOK in the final. Together with Dejan Bodiroga, he led Panathinaikos in scoring in the final playoff series, averaging 15.7 points per game.

The following season, Alvertis helped lead Panathinaikos to the 2001 SuproLeague Final Four, averaging 13.4 points per game. The Greens lost to Maccabi Tel Aviv in the final. As for the Greek League, Olympiacos had once again a very solid team that year, featuring Dino Radja, David Rivers and Nikos Oikonomou. After the final series was tied at 2–2, Alvertis scored 23 points in Game 5, including seven straight points in the clutch, thus offering Panathinaikos one more Greek League title. His legend, especially among the green fans, was still growing.

After winning everything at the club level, Alvertis' thirst for titles did not subside nonetheless. In the 2001–02 season he led the Panathinaikos offense along with Dejan Bodiroga, Damir Mulaomerović and İbrahim Kutluay, averaging 10.2 points per game; in the 2002 EuroLeague Final against Kinder Bologna, he scored 11 points, showing great leadership throughout the game. By lifting his third EuroLeague title, Alvertis proved that the sky was the limit concerning the number of his titles.

Owing to the renovation of the Nikos Galis Olympic Indoor Hall for the 2004 Athens Olympic Games, Panathinaikos had to move to the 2,500 capacity Sporting Arena for the 2002–03 season. The club's budget consequently decreased by nearly half, thus hurting the team's strength. Despite that, Panathinaikos led its regular season EuroLeague group with an 11–3 record. After averaging 12.7 points per game in the first three Top 16 games, Alvertis’ season was cut short by an injury which caused him to miss the remaining three games. As a result, Panathinaikos did not manage to make it to the 2003 EuroLeague Final Four, without its natural leader. In the Greek League, Alvertis was there to assure PAO's dominance, winning its fifth title in six seasons. He averaged 12 points per game in the finals against AEK, and was voted the Greek League MVP. Prior to that, he had led the Greens to their first Greek Cup since 1996, scoring 22 points in the final against Aris, and being named the tournament's MVP.

The 2003–04 season presented many similarities to the previous one, as Panathinaikos remained in the Sporting Arena. Despite Alvertis averaging 11.2 points per game and providing veteran leadership in the locker room, his EuroLeague season ended again on an injury in the fourth game of the Top 16 against Barcelona. Panathinaikos was not able to reach further to the 2004 EuroLeague Final Four. Alvertis’ sixth Greek League title came after averaging 11 points in the playoffs, including a 21 points outing against Olympiacos in the quarterfinals. The latter was the seventh and last time he led all Panathinaikos scorers in a playoff matchup versus their archrivals.

=== 2004–2009: A new role for a leader ===
The 2004–05 season meant an adjustment for the captain of Panathinaikos. Unable to contribute to Head Coach Obradović's demanding systems as efficiently as before, he was not starting in any of the games anymore. Nevertheless, he came off the bench as a spot shooter, who gave the team valuable perimeter scoring and experience. Along with the team's new stars Dimitris Diamantidis, Jaka Lakovič, and Mike Batiste, PAO made it to the 2005 EuroLeague Final Four in Moscow, where they lost to Šarūnas Jasikevičius' and Anthony Parker's Maccabi Tel Aviv. Alvertis finished the EuroLeague season with an average 8.4 points per game, the lowest since his first EuroLeague campaign in the 1993–94 season. Finally that same season, he lifted another Greek League trophy, after averaging 12 points per game against AEK in the Greek League's Finals.

During his sixteenth season with Panathinaikos, Alvertis had the same role as in the previous year. Coming off the bench, he helped his team make the EuroLeague Top 8. In their playoff series, TAU Ceramica pulled off an upset during the decisive third game in Athens, thus preventing PAO from reaching the 2006 EuroLeague Final Four. This disappointment was slightly relieved by the team's sweep against Olympiacos, in the Greek League Finals.

The 2006–07 season was a great one for Panathinaikos, as they won the EuroLeague Final in Athens, as well as the Greek League and the Greek Cup titles. Alvertis’ contribution had not been significant on the court, but the captain of the Greens was ready to serve his team whenever they needed him. The 2007–08 season confirmed that, with Alvertis being the soul of the Greens in the locker room, even though his contribution on the court was again limited. PAO won both the Greek League and the Greek Cup yet another time. The 2008–09 season was his last on the team's roster, as his role was at that point had become merely symbolic.

2009-Today

“Fragi” is always a symbol for Panathinaikos. After his retirement, Alvertis have never get out of this team. He was always there to help the team achieve all the targets. From 2009, until 2020 he has contributed in many positions: technical director, coach, assistant coach, Panathinaikos academies manager. In 2020, he became the co-general manager of the Greek club Panathinaikos Athens. On April 12, 2022, Fragkiskos Alvertis was removed from his administrative positions and replaced with Argyris Pedoulakis, after a rather unfortunate season in EuroLeague. As general manager in two years, Alvertis won 3 titles: 2020–21 Greek Basket League, Greek Basketball Cup 2020-21, 2021-22 Greek Basketball Super Cup .

== National team career ==
=== Greek junior national team ===
As one of the best European prospects at the age of 17, Alvertis was selected to the Greek junior national team. With Greece's junior national team, he won the silver medal at the 1991 FIBA Europe Under-16 Championship. He also played at the 1992 FIBA Europe Under-18 Championship, in which Greece finished in fourth place. He won another silver medal with Greece's junior national team, at the 1992 FIBA Europe Under-20 Championship.

=== 1995–1998: The first steps ===
Alvertis' first appearance with the Greece men's national basketball team, was in a friendly game against Germany on 28 May 1993, when he was 18. The first major tournament in which Alvertis represented the Greece men's national basketball team was the EuroBasket 1995, when he was 21. Greece made it to the tournament's semifinals and finished the competition in fourth place. Serving as Giorgos Sigalas' substitution, Alvertis did not start in any of the games, nor did he get very significant playing time. He finished the tournament averaging 4.9 points per game.

The following year, Alvertis was already a permanent member of the Greek team and took part at the 1996 Summer Olympic Games in Atlanta, Georgia. Even though he still was not starting the games, his contribution rose to 8.6 points per game, as Greece finished at an all-time Olympics best fifth position. It was obvious however, that the departure of the legendary Greece men's national team player Panagiotis Giannakis, and the imminent departure of another Greek legend, Fanis Christodoulou, would increase Alvertis’ responsibilities.

At the EuroBasket 1997, Greece once again started the tournament with very high ambitions, and a victory against title contender Russia, in the qualifying group raised their hopes even higher. Alvertis’ role on the team remained unaltered, as he remained a secondary, but significant option on offense, averaging 6.9 points per game. Greece eventually fell to the tournament's eventual champions, FR Yugoslavia, in the semifinal, losing by a score of 80–88. The Greek team finished in fourth place, losing the bronze medal game to Russia, by a score of 98–78.

=== 1998–2001: Leader of the national team ===
Eager to confirm they were a part of the world basketball elite, Greece aimed at reaching the semifinals in the 1998 FIBA World Championship, in Athens. Head Coach Panagiotis Giannakis was confident that the Greek team would fulfill its mission, and he put Alvertis, alongside his Panathinaikos teammate Nikos Oikonomou, in charge of the team's offense. Alvertis averaged 13.2 points and a surprisingly high 6.2 rebounds per game, being a major contributor to Greece's fourth-place finish at the tournament. He most notably scored the three-pointer that sealed the fate of the quarterfinals match against Spain, giving Greece a 65–58 advantage with 53 seconds left in the game. His leading role in the team had become indisputable, especially since the great Greek player Panagiotis Fasoulas had retired from the national team after the end of the tournament.

At the EuroBasket 1999, Alvertis seemed ready to lead Greece to its first medal since 1989. After leading the team in offense, with an average of 18.1 points per game in the qualifying round, everything seemed to indicate a great upcoming EuroBasket for the Greek star. Nevertheless, misfortune is part of the game of basketball. A few days before the tournament, Alvertis suffered a severe injury during practice. That injury caused him to not only miss the EuroBasket tournament, but also a major part of the 1999–00 club season. Without its offensive leader, and without key players Nikos Oikonomou and Efthimios Rentzias, who were also injured, Greece finished in an embarrassing sixteenth and last place at the tournament. They consequently failed to qualify for the 2000 Summer Olympics, and were doomed to two years of exclusion from every major tournament.

Greece had to wait for the EuroBasket 2001 in order to make its comeback on the international scene. The team was obviously in the middle of a transition period, during which its young stars Theo Papaloukas, Antonis Fotsis, and Lazaros Papadopoulos were unable to build a highly competitive team right away. Alvertis, coming off a great club year with Panathinaikos, and Giorgos Sigalas, had to show to the younger generation of Greek players the road to success. The first game against reigning champion Italy proved that Alvertis was ready to fulfill his role as a leader. His buzzer-beating three pointer gave Greece a very impressive 83–82 win. The team, however, had not reached the level of a medal contender yet. The 105–82 loss against Russia in the next game confirmed that. Consequently, in order to reach the quarterfinals, Greece's game against rising power Germany appeared to be a difficult task. After leading the game by 22 points in the eighteenth minute of the game, the Greek team eventually collapsed against the frontcourt of Dirk Nowitzki, Ademola Okulaja and Shawn Bradley, and lost by a score of 80–75. Alvertis averaged 16 points in the tournament, but Greece ended up in ninth place. It was his last opportunity to reach success with the national team as its leader, especially since Greece had not qualified for the 2002 FIBA World Championship. The transition period to the young generation was soon going to be over.

=== 2001–2004: The last years ===
Prior to the EuroBasket 2003, Alvertis was a player whose leadership and experience with Panathinaikos and the Greece national team were priceless. Consequently, although his role within the Greece national team had become secondary on the court, it was still a leading one off the court. He was in charge of transmitting values such as commitment, partnership, and ambition to the new generation of Greek stars. After Greece finished in fifth place at both the EuroBasket 2003 and the 2004 Summer Olympics, the veteran star announced his retirement from the Greece men's National Team. Alvertis kept his word that he was staying retired from the national team, even though Head Coach Giannakis initially thought about including him on the Greek team that would eventually win the gold medal at the EuroBasket 2005. Alvertis had already seen that the future of the Greece national team was in good hands.

In total, Alvertis had 155 appearances with the Greece men's national team. In those 155 appearances, he scored a total of 1,605 points, for a career scoring average of averaging 10.4 points per game.

== Player profile ==
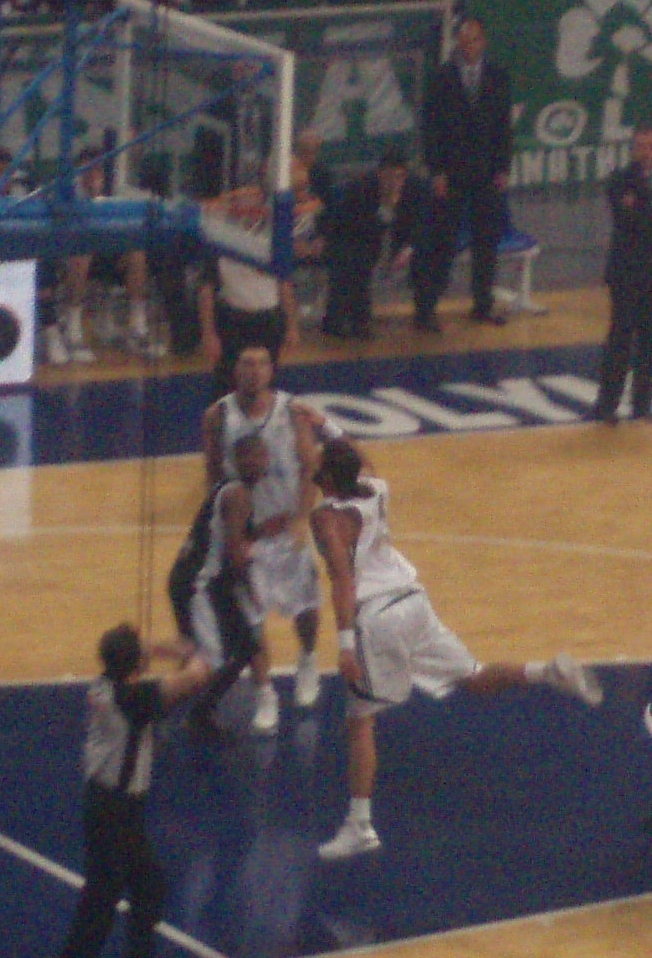
Alvertis attempting a layup

Alvertis was regarded for most of his career as one of the best sharp shooters in Europe. While his relative lack of athleticism and average all around skills did not allow him to create his own shot on a consistent basis, his exceptional shooting prowess, with a rare combination of height and mechanics, turned him into a very hard to defend mismatch on the perimeter. As a consequence, he converted at a quite efficient rate, in numerous clutch situations over the years.

Alvertis was also an accomplished defender, that was often credited with effectively defending the opposing team's shooting guard or small forward. Over the last five years of his career, he mainly played at the power forward position, due to his height and size, thus adjusting to the increased pace of the game in the new millennium.

Alvertis served as captain of Panathinaikos and was regarded as a team leader both on and off the court. Panathinaikos head coach Željko Obradović praised his leadership, stating, "Alvertis is the best captain I ever had."

== Awards and accomplishments ==
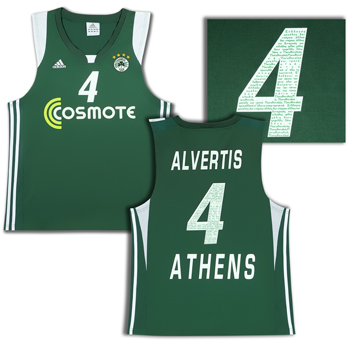
Alvertis' retired #4 Panathinaikos jersey

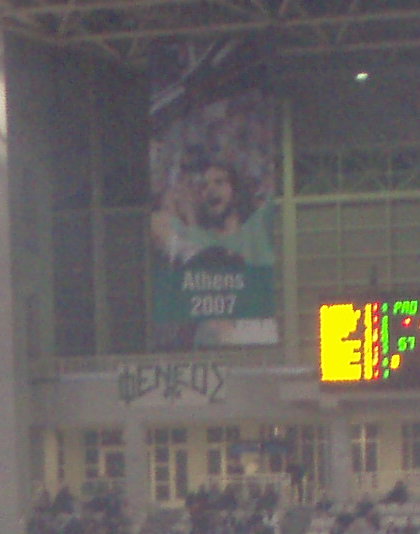
Giant portrait of "Fragi" on Nikos Galis Olympic Indoor Hall's roof

=== As a player ===
==== Panathinaikos ====
- 5× EuroLeague Champion: (1996, 2000, 2002, 2007, 2009)
- 11× Greek League Champion: (1998, 1999, 2000, 2001, 2003, 2004, 2005, 2006, 2007, 2008, 2009)
- 8× Greek Cup Winner: (1993, 1996, 2003, 2005, 2006, 2007, 2008, 2009)
- 2× Triple Crown Winner: (2007, 2009)
- FIBA Intercontinental Cup Champion: (1996)
- EuroLeague All-Final Four Team: (1996)
- 12× Greek League All-Star: (1994 II, 1996 I, 1996 II, 1997, 1998, 2001–2007)
- 3× consecutive Greek All-Star Game 3 Point Shootout Contest Champion: (1996 I, 1996 II, 1997)
- Greek Cup Finals Top Scorer: (2003)
- Greek Cup MVP: (2003)
- Greek League MVP: (2003)
- In his pro club career with Panathinaikos, he won a total of 25 titles.
- Selected to the EuroLeague's 50th anniversary 50 Greatest EuroLeague Contributors: (2008)
- No. 4 retired by Panathinaikos: (2009)
- 101 Greats of European Basketball: (2018)
- Greek Basket League Hall of Fame (2022)

==== National basketball team ====
- Acropolis Tournament MVP: (2000)
- Eurobasket.com website's 1998 FIBA World Championship: All-Tournament Third Team (unofficial)

=== As a team manager ===
- 3× Greek League Champion: (2010, 2011, 2013)
- 3× Greek Cup Winner: (2012, 2013, 2014)
- EuroLeague Champion: (2011)

=== As a head coach ===
- Greek League Champion: (2014)

== Career statistics ==
Legend
GP	Games played	GS	Games started	MPG	Minutes per game
FG%	Field-goal percentage	3P%	3-point field-goal percentage	FT%	Free-throw percentage
RPG	Rebounds per game	APG	Assists per game	SPG	Steals per game
BPG	Blocks per game	PPG	Points per game	PIR	Performance index rating
**Bold**	Career high

=== EuroLeague ===
†	Denotes seasons in which Alvertis won the EuroLeague

Year	Team	GP	GS	MPG	FG%	3P%	FT%	RPG	APG	SPG	BPG	PPG	PIR
1993–94	Panathinaikos	21	—	23.0	.432	.446	.636	2.6	0.5	0.4	.0	8.0	—
1994–95	Panathinaikos	21	—	28.0	.426	.354	.776	2.9	1.0	0.9	.0	12.0	—
1995–96†	Panathinaikos	21	—	**29.4**	.456	.400	.773	3.3	1.3	0.8	.0	10.8	—
1996–97	Panathinaikos	20	—	28.5	.447	.391	.884	3.3	0.6	0.8	.0	12.7	—
1998–99	Panathinaikos	17	—	29.3	.468	.410	.750	3.2	**1.4**	0.9	.0	11.5	—
1999–00†	Panathinaikos	10	—	22.5	**.528**	.438	**.900**	1.8	0.7	0.4	0.1	7.9	—
2000–01 (SuproLeague)	Panathinaikos	**24**	—	26.5	.446	.415	.800	**3.4**	1.2	**1.0**	0.1	**13.4**	—
2001–02†	Panathinaikos	22	**13**	26.0	.463	.373	.810	3.0	0.7	0.9	**0.2**	10.2	**9.1**
2002–03	Panathinaikos	17	12	23.7	.462	.436	.833	1.6	0.4	0.8	.0	9.9	6.9
2003–04	Panathinaikos	16	6	23.7	.474	.429	.826	1.9	1.1	0.3	0.1	11.2	8.4
2004–05	Panathinaikos	20	0	18.6	.457	.478	.756	1.4	0.7	0.7	0.2	8.4	6.5
2005–06	Panathinaikos	16	0	17.0	.500	**.500**	.864	1.3	0.3	0.8	0.1	8.0	6.6
2006–07†	Panathinaikos	11	2	9.2	.323	.304	.818	0.5	0.5	0.1	.0	3.3	0.8
2007–08	Panathinaikos	12	1	8.3	.286	.375	.259	0.8	0.3	0.3	0.1	3.0	1.6
2008–09†	Panathinaikos	1	0	3.8	.000	.000	.000	.0	.0	.0	.0	.0	-2.0
Career		249	—	23.4	.450	.410	.798	2.2	0.8	0.7	0.1	9.8	6.2

- During his club career, Alvertis played in a total of 15 EuroLeague seasons, including the 2000–01 FIBA SuproLeague season. In his last EuroLeague season (2008–09), Alvertis played in just one game, in which he came off the bench. During that game, he registered no stats, except for two missed three-point field goal attempts, in four minutes of playing time.
