= Liga Sudamericana de Básquetbol MVP =

Annual basketball award

The Liga Sudamericana de Básquetbol MVP, or FIBA South American League MVP, is an annual basketball award, that is given by the professional South American second-tier level Liga Sudamericana de Básquetbol (LSB), which is commonly known as the FIBA South American League, to its Most Valuable Player of each league season. The award began with the league's inaugural 1996 season. The first award winner was Jorge Racca. The player with the most awards won so far is Guilherme Giovannoni, whom won the award twice, in 2010 and 2013.

== List of winners ==
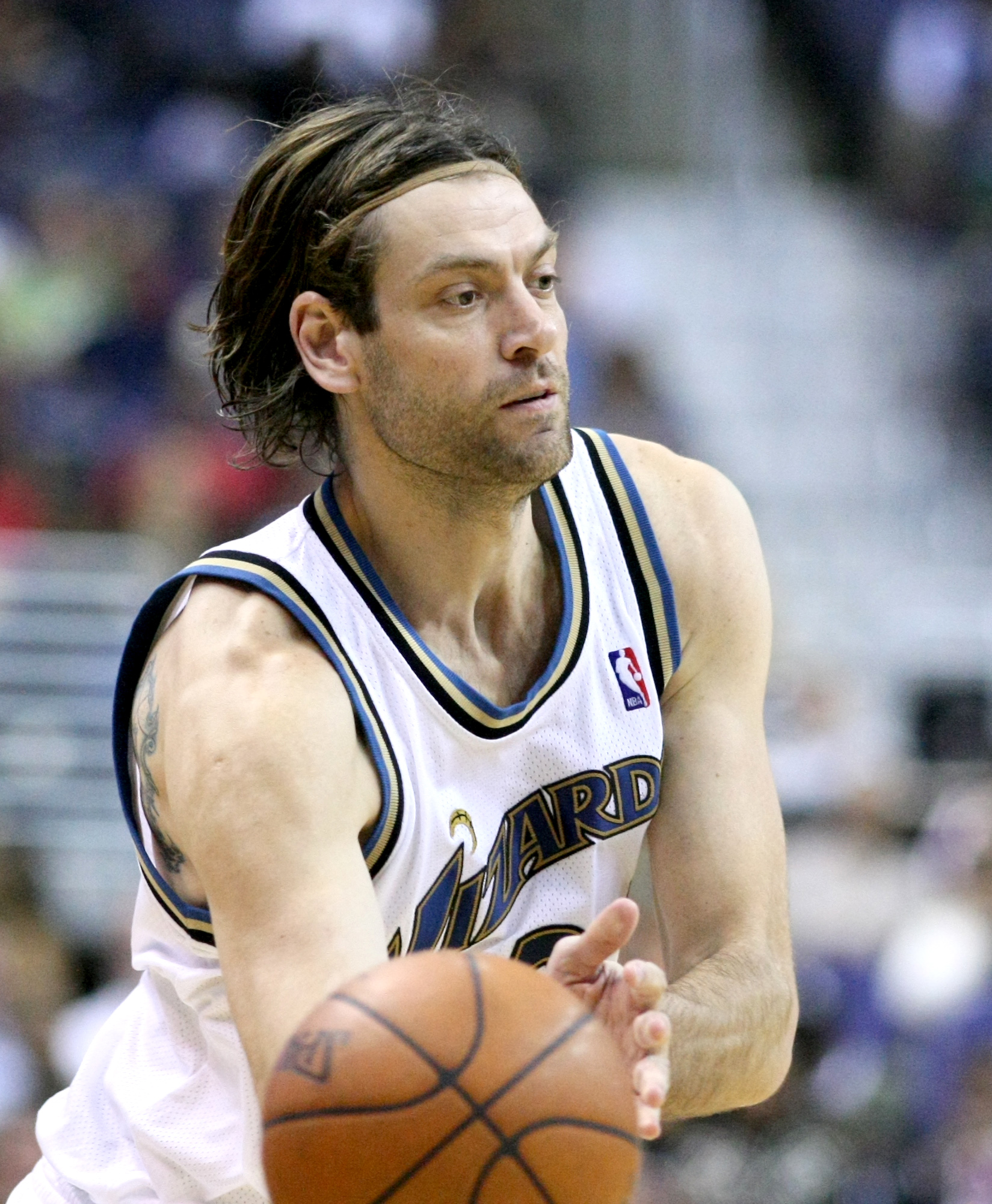
Fabricio Oberto won the FIBA South American League MVP in 1998.

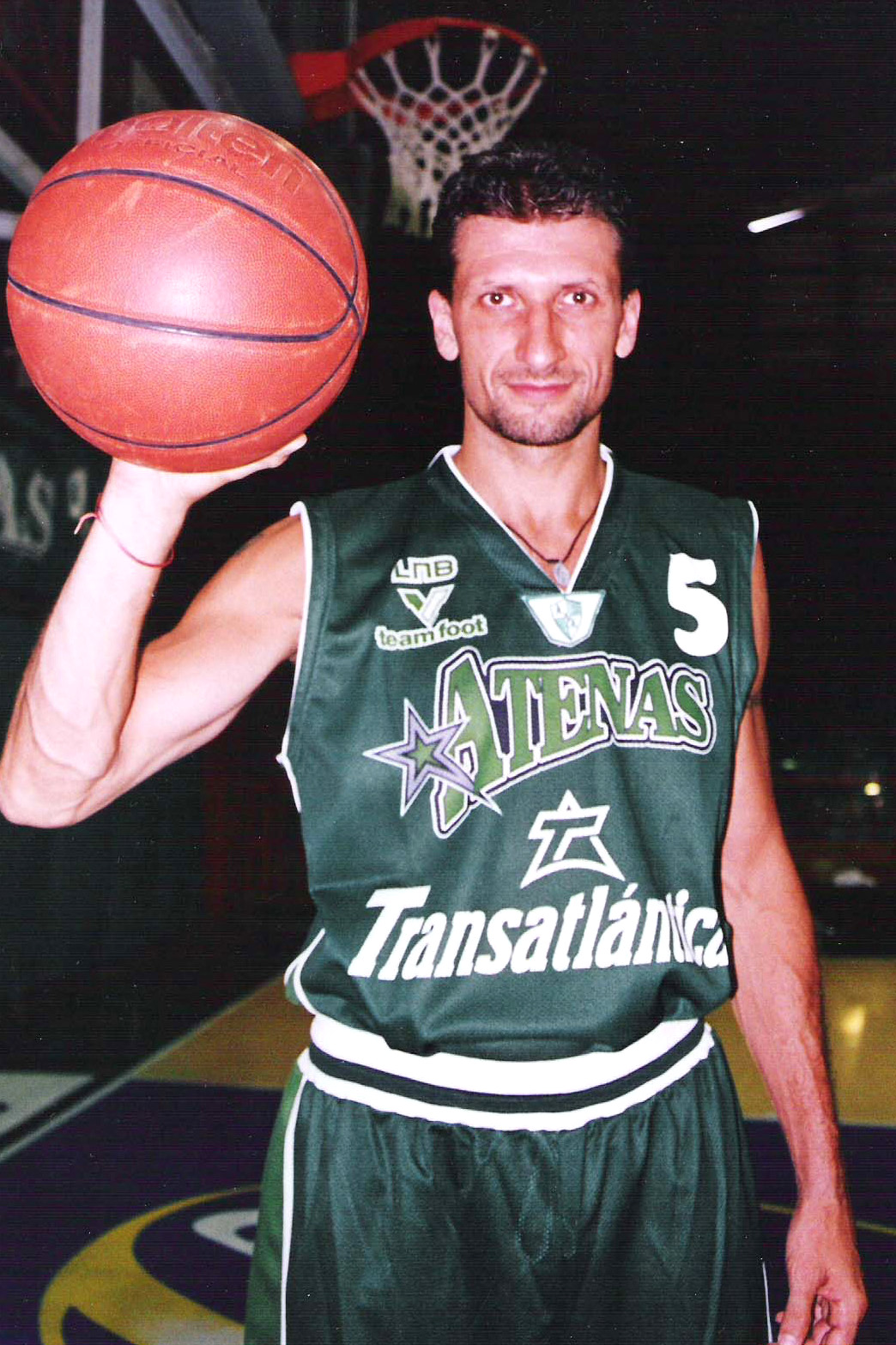
Héctor Campana won the FIBA South American League MVP in 2004.

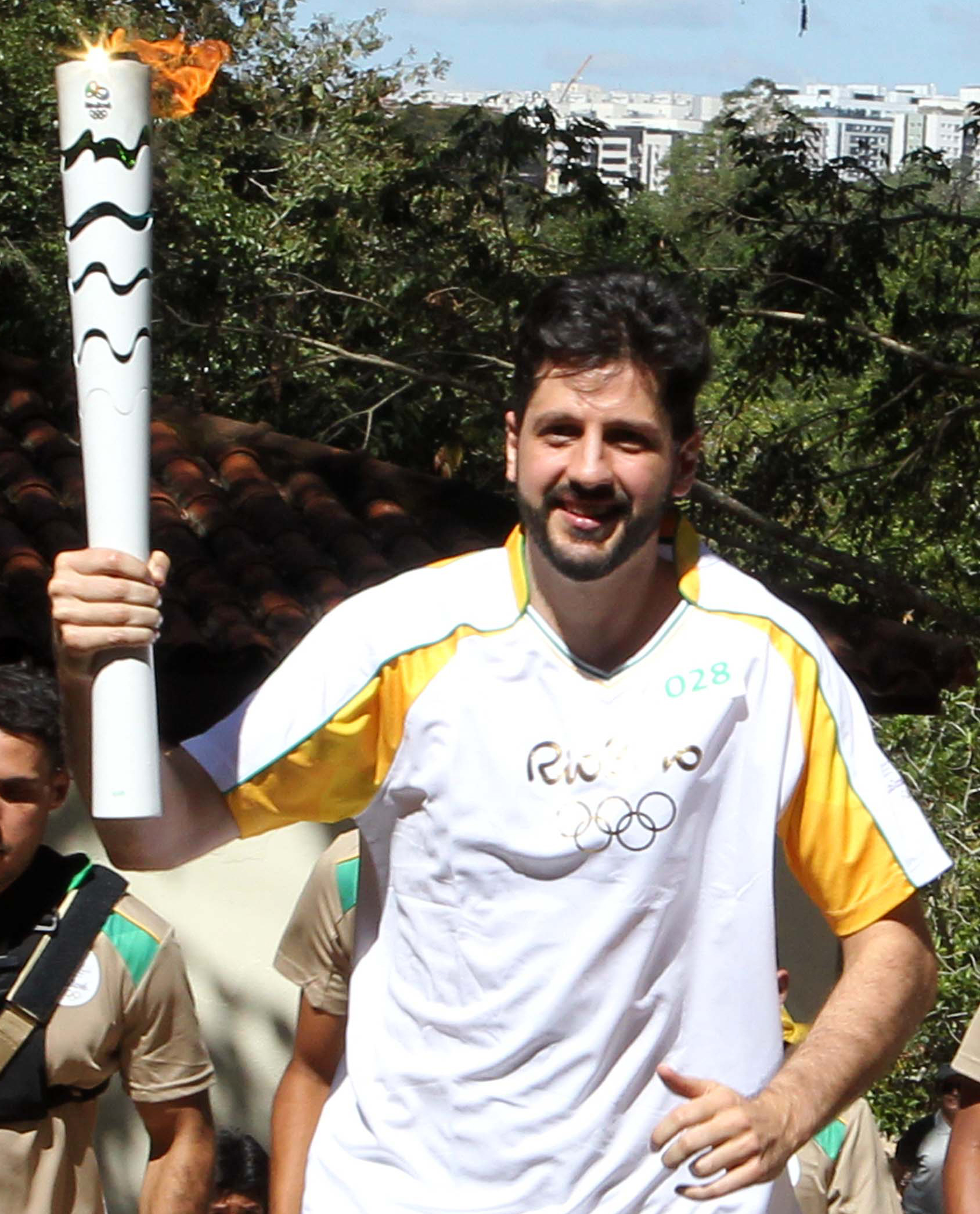
Guilherme Giovannoni won the FIBA South American League MVP twice (2010, 2013).

Season	MVP	Club	Ref.
South American 2nd Tier (1996–2000)
1996	(Argentina) Jorge Racca	(Argentina) Olimpia	
1997	(United States) Greg Dennis	(Argentina) Atenas	
1998	(Argentina) Fabricio Oberto	(Argentina) Atenas	
1999	(United States) Charles Byrd	(Brazil) Vasco da Gama	
2000	(Dominican Republic) José Vargas	(Brazil) Vasco da Gama	
South American 1st Tier (2001–2007)
2001	(Argentina) Dani Farabello	(Argentina) Estudiantes	
2002	(Argentina) Mariano Cerutti	(Argentina) Libertad	
2003	season not held		
2004	(Argentina) Héctor Campana	(Argentina) Atenas	
2005	(Brazil) Valtinho da Silva	(Brazil) Unitri Uberlândia	
2006	(Argentina) Leo Gutiérrez	(Argentina) Ben Hur	
2007	(United States) Cleotis Brown	(Argentina) Libertad	
South American 2nd Tier (2008–Present)
2008	(Argentina) Alejandro Montecchia	(Argentina) Regatas Corrientes	
2009 (I)	(Brazil) Marcelinho Machado	(Brazil) Flamengo	
2009 (II)	(Argentina) Julio Mázzaro	(Argentina) Quimsa	
2010	(Brazil) Guilherme Giovannoni	(Brazil) Brasília	
2011	(Argentina) J. P. Gutiérrez	(Argentina) Obras Sanitarias	
2012	(Argentina) Paolo Quinteros	(Argentina) Regatas Corrientes	
2013	(Brazil) Guilherme Giovannoni	(Brazil) Brasília	
2014	(Brazil) Alex Garcia	(Brazil) Bauru	
2015	(Brazil) Deryk Ramos	(Brazil) Brasília	
2016	(United States) Shamell	(Brazil) Mogi das Cruzes	
2017	(Venezuela) Heissler Guillént	(Venezuela) Guaros de Lara	
2018	(United States) David Jackson	(Brazil) Franca	
2019	(Brazil) Cauê Borges	(Brazil) Botafogo	
2022	(Brazil) Danilo Fuzaro	(Brazil) Bauru	
2023	(United States) Nathan Hoover	(Argentina) Instituto	
2024	(Chile) Manny Suárez	(Uruguay) Nacional	
2025	(Argentina) Eduardo Vasirani	(Argentina) Ferro Carril Oeste	

== Players with multiple MVPs won ==
Player	MVPs	Years won
(Brazil) Guilherme Giovannoni	2	2010, 2013

== See also ==
- Basketball Champions League Americas
- FIBA Americas League
- FIBA Americas League Grand Final MVP
- FIBA South American League
