= Sacred Heart High School (Kansas) =

Sacred Heart Junior-Senior High School

Location
- 234 East Cloud Street; Salina, Saline, Kansas 67401; United States; 38°48′40″N 97°36′22″W

Information
- School type: Private, Coeducational, High School
- Religious affiliation: Roman Catholic
- Denomination: Diocese of Salina
- Founded: 1908
- Superintendent: Nick Compagnone
- CEEB code: 72675
- NCES School ID: 00489316
- Principal: John Krajicek
- Staff: 10
- Teaching staff: 27
- Grades: 7 – 12
- Gender: coed
- Enrollment: 246 (2012-13)
- Student to teacher ratio: 13:1
- Hours in school day: 7.3
- Colors: Royal blue Vegas Gold
- Slogan: In all that we do... Bring glory and honor to God.
- Athletics: KSHSAA
- Athletics conference: North Central Activity Association
- Sports: See Athletics section
- Mascot: Knights
- Nickname: Sacred Heart Knights
- Accreditation: North Central Association of Colleges and Schools
- Publication: The Knightline
- Affiliations: KSHSAA
- Alumni: See Notable Alumni section
- Website: www.shknights.com

Sacred Heart High School is a private Roman Catholic junior-senior high school in Salina, Kansas. It is in the Roman Catholic Diocese of Salina.

== Extracurricular activities ==
=== Athletics ===
Sacred Heart is a member of the Kansas State High School Activities Association. The school has won 40 state championships in various sports. The school offers numerous sports.

High school sports

- Baseball
- Basketball
- Bowling
- Cross country
- Football
- Golf (boys)
- Softball
- Tennis (girls)
- Track & field
- Volleyball

Junior high sports

- Basketball
- Cross country
- Football
- Track & field
- Volleyball

=== State championships ===
State championships
Season	Sport	Number of championships	Year(s)
Fall	Football	3	1969, 1974, 1979
Fall	Cross country, boys	3	1964, 1968, 1969
Fall	Cross country, girls	3	1979, 2003, 2004
Fall	Tennis, girls	1	2021
Fall	Volleyball	3	1979, 2000, 2004
Winter	Basketball, boys	9	1933, 1934, 1937, 1954, 1975, 1979, 1980, 1981, 2017
Winter	Indoor track & field, boys	1	1967
Spring	Golf, boys	8	1997, 2015, 2016, 2017, 2018, 2019, 2021, 2022
Spring	Baseball	3	1992, 2000, 2003
Spring	Softball	6	1998, 1999, 2001, 2005, 2006, 2007
Spring	Track & field, boys	3	1984, 2012, 2013
Total		43	

=== Clubs/Organizations ===
Sacred Heart offers many clubs and organizations to the students, sponsored by the teachers.

- Student council
- Yearbook
- Junior Civitan
- Spirit team
- Scholar's bowl
- National Honor Society
- Debate/public speaking
- Chorus
- Culture and diversity club
- Instrumental music
- Annual play/musical
- Publicity
- Relay for Life
- Art competition
- Mathcounts
- Foreign language
- Seatbelts Are For Everyone (SAFE)

== Notable alumni ==
- Kurt Budke, former NCAA coach for Oklahoma State University Cowgirls
- Todd Jadlow, former college and professional basketball player
- Pat Meares, former MLB player for Minnesota Twins, Pittsburgh Pirates

== See also ==
- List of high schools in Kansas
- List of unified school districts in Kansas
