= Leonidas Skoutaris =

Greek basketball player

Leonidas Skoutaris (Greek: Λεωνίδας Σκούταρης; born 28 August 1976 in Athens, Greece), is a retired Greek professional basketball player.

== College career ==
Skoutaris played college basketball at Cleveland State, with the Cleveland State Vikings.

== Professional career ==
On 12 September 1996, Skoutaris won the FIBA Intercontinental Cup championship while playing for Panathinaikos. In the 3rd game of the Intercontinental Cup between Panathinaikos and Olympia Tuerto, Skoutaris scored 3 points.

He also played for Ilysiakos and Panerythraikos.
