= Czechoslovakia men's national under-20 basketball team =

Czechoslovakia
- FIBA zone: FIBA Europe
- National federation: Basketball Federation of Czechoslovakia

U20 European Championship
- Appearances: 1
- Medals: None

The Czechoslovakia men's national under-20 basketball team was a national basketball team of Czechoslovakia. It represented the country in men's international under-20 basketball competitions. The team finished in 5th place at the 1992 FIBA Europe Under-20 Championship.

== Team results ==
12 July 1992

Boxscore

Greece	76–63	Czechoslovakia

13 July 1992

Boxscore

Israel	74–60	Czechoslovakia

14 July 1992

Boxscore

Czechoslovakia	66–59	Poland

15 July 1992

Boxscore

Czechoslovakia	81–75	Spain

16 July 1992

Boxscore

Germany	81–88	Czechoslovakia

18 July 1992

Boxscore

Czechoslovakia	64–63	Belgium

19 July 1992

Boxscore

Spain	66–74	Czechoslovakia

== See also ==
- Czechoslovakia men's national basketball team
- Czechoslovakia men's national under-18 basketball team
