= Haris Brkić =

Yugoslav basketball player

Personal information
- Born: 24 July 1974 Sarajevo, SR Bosnia-Herzegovina, SFR Yugoslavia
- Died: 15 December 2000 (aged 26) Belgrade, Serbia, FR Yugoslavia
- Listed height: 2.00 m (6 ft 7 in)

Career information
- NBA draft: 1996: undrafted
- Playing career: 1992–2000
- Position: Shooting guard / small forward
- Number: 5, 6

Career history
- 1992–1999: Partizan
- 1992–1993: → Borac Čačak
- 1999–2000: Budućnost Podgorica
- 2000: Partizan

Career highlights
- 4× Yugoslav champion (1995–1997, 2000); 3× Yugoslav Cup winner (1994, 1995, 1999)

Haris Brkić (Serbian: Харис Бркић; 24 July 1974 – 15 December 2000) was a Yugoslavian basketball player. He achieved greatest results in Partizan and he is still remembered by fans for his great contribution to the club.

== Club career ==
Born to a Bosniak father, Ismet (1945–2018), and a Serb mother, Radmila (born 1951), Brkić started playing basketball when he was 10 years old in Bosna from Sarajevo.

In spring 1992, with the outbreak of the Bosnian War, seventeen-year-old Brkić fled to Serbia where he initially stayed with his maternal grandmother in Požarevac. Within weeks, a tryout was arranged with KK Partizan and the player got added to the club's youth team. Simultaneously, the club's full squad led by the debutante head coach Željko Obradović and coaching consultant Aleksandar Nikolić had just won the Euroleague title at the Final Four in Istanbul. Training in the club's youth system for the last few months of the 1991-92 season, Brkić didn't see any action with the full squad.

In the summer of 1992, Brkić got sent out on loan to KK Borac Čačak where his professional career began in earnest.

A year later, he returned to Belgrade, beginning the 1993–94 season with the Partizan first team led by the also newly arrived head coach Željko Lukajić. Brkić played for Partizan in the next six seasons, winning three national championships and three domestic cups. Haris was one of the best players in Partizan team which played in 1997–98 EuroLeague Final Four.

During the 1999–2000, season he played for Budućnost Podgorica where he won Yugoslav league once again. Brkić started the 2000–01 season at Podgorica, but in November 2000 came back to Partizan. After his comeback to Belgrade he played just three more games for Partizan.

== National team ==
=== Youth ===
Brkić was a member of the Yugoslav national junior team that won the bronze medal at the 1996 FIBA Europe Under-20 Championship in Turkey. Playing in the team led by head coach Rajko Toroman, together with Partizan teammates Predrag Drobnjak and Dragan Lukovski as well as Vlado Šćepanović and Jovo Stanojević, Brkić averaged 11.0 points per game over seven games at the championship.

=== Senior ===
Brkić suited up for the Yugoslav national basketball team in several preparation friendly games, never managing to make the final cut for the big competitions.

== Death ==
On 12 December 2000, Brkić left a practice session early after not feeling well. He was shot by an unknown assailant while unlocking his car at the parking lot in front of Pionir Hall in Belgrade. Haris died three days later. It is still not known who had killed him.

Every summer, his former teams Bosna, Partizan, and Budućnost organize a memorial tournament. Grobari, fans of Partizan, often chant during Partizan games: "You left us Haris, only sadness remains, you will be always loved by Grobari from South stand!"

On 18 December 2023, an episode of "Na mestu zločina sa Mašanom" (At the crime scene with Mašan) was released, covering the death of Haris.

== See also ==
- List of basketball players who died during their careers
- List of unsolved murders
