= 1996 Liga Sudamericana de Básquetbol =

South American basketball tournament

Liga Sudamericana de Básquetbol
- Season: 1996
- Dates: 6 February – 1 May 1996
- Teams: 16

Finals
- Champions: (Argentina) Olimpia
- Runners-up: (Brazil) Corinthians
- Semifinalists: (Brazil) Dharma Yara Franca (Brazil) Rio Claro

The 1996 Liga Sudamericana de Básquetbol, or 1996 FIBA South American League, was the first edition of the second-tier tournament for professional basketball clubs from South America. The tournament began on 6 February 1996 and finished on 1 May 1996. Argentine club Olimpia won the tournament, defeating Brazilian club Corinthians in the Grand Finals.

== Format ==
Teams were split into four groups of four teams each and played each other in a home-and-away round-robin format. The top two teams from each group advanced to the final stage, a best-of-three direct playoff elimination where the champion was decided.

== Teams ==
Country	Team
Argentina	Independiente de General Pico
Argentina	Olimpia
Bolivia	Ingavi de La Paz
Brazil	Corinthians
Brazil	Dharma Yara Franca
Brazil	Rio Claro
Chile	Universidad de Concepción
Chile	Universidad de Temuco
Colombia	Caimanes de Barranquilla
Ecuador	Filanbanco
Paraguay	Sol de América
Peru	Regatas Lima
Uruguay	Aguada
Uruguay	Hebraica y Macabi
Venezuela	Cocodrilos de Caracas
Venezuela	Panteras de Miranda

== Group stage ==
=== Group A ===
Pos	Team	Pld	W	L	Pts	Qualification	DHA	IND	ING	REG
1	(Brazil) Dharma Yara Franca	6	5	1	11	Advances to final stage	—	100–95	134–83	112–93
2	(Argentina) Independiente de General Pico	6	4	2	10	Advances to final stage	123–119	—	154–84	94–75
3	(Bolivia) Ingavi de La Paz	6	2	4	8		117–120	96–114	—	93–89
4	(Peru) Regatas Lima	6	1	5	7		77–82	88–84	99–78	—

Source: FIBA Archive

=== Group B ===
Pos	Team	Pld	W	L	Pts	Qualification	RIO	CAI	SOL	AGU
1	(Brazil) Rio Claro	6	6	0	12	Advances to final stage	—	94–79	118–85	80–79
2	(Colombia) Caimanes de Barranquilla	6	4	2	10	Advances to final stage	87–92	—	97–89	98–94
3	(Paraguay) Sol de América	6	1	5	7		72–85	96–102	—	123–90
4	(Uruguay) Aguada	6	1	5	7		77–100	84–104	97–79	—

Source: FIBA Archive

=== Group C ===
Pos	Team	Pld	W	L	Pts	Qualification	COR	PAN	FIL	CON
1	(Brazil) Corinthians	6	6	0	12	Advances to final stage	—	98–71	109–78	128–108
2	(Venezuela) Panteras de Miranda	6	3	3	9	Advances to final stage	92–106	—	127–86	104–91
3	(Ecuador) Filanbanco	6	2	4	8		81–99	106–126	—	97–91
4	(Chile) Universidad de Concepción	6	1	5	7		98–103	124–103	107–109	—

Source: FIBA Archive

=== Group D ===
Pos	Team	Pld	W	L	Pts	Qualification	OLI	HEB	COC	TEM
1	(Argentina) Olimpia	6	5	1	11	Advances to final stage	—	84–83	119–93	107–98
2	(Uruguay) Hebraica y Macabi	6	4	2	10	Advances to final stage	98–94	—	107–81	113–100
3	(Venezuela) Cocodrilos de Caracas	6	3	3	9		97–107	113–110	—	91–83
4	(Chile) Universidad de Temuco	6	0	6	6		82–107	91–93	99–104	—

Source: FIBA Archive

== Final stage ==
Quarterfinals
(Brazil) Dharma Yara Franca	2
(Venezuela) Panteras de Miranda	1
(Argentina) Olimpia	2
(Colombia) Caimanes de Barranquilla	0
(Brazil) Corinthians	2
(Argentina) Independiente de General Pico	0
(Brazil) Rio Claro	2
(Uruguay) Hebraica y Macabi	1

Semifinals
(Brazil) Dharma Yara Franca	0
(Argentina) Olimpia	2
(Brazil) Corinthians	2
(Brazil) Rio Claro	0

Grand Finals
(Argentina) Olimpia	2
(Brazil) Corinthians	0

== Finals series ==
The matches were played on 23 and 30 April 1996.

- Olimpia (VT) - SC Corinthians 112–97
- SC Corinthians - Olimpia (VT) 100–101

== Finals rosters ==
Olimpia de Venado Tuerto: Alejandro Montecchia, Walter Guiñazú, Jorge Racca, Michael Wilson, Todd Jadlow - Sebastián Uranga, Lucas Victoria, Leonardo Gutiérrez. Coach: Horacio Segui

Corinthians: James Carter, Fernando Minucci, Oscar Schmidt, Mingão, Rich McIver. Coach: Flor Meléndez

== Season MVP ==
- (Argentina) Jorge Racca

== Sources ==
- 1996 season - Latinbasket.Com
- Olimpia 1996
