= CIS men's national under-20 basketball team =

Commonwealth of Independent States
- FIBA zone: FIBA Europe

U20 European Championship
- Appearances: 1
- Medals: None

The CIS men's national under-20 basketball team was a national basketball team of the Commonwealth of Independent States. It represented the country in men's international under-20 basketball competitions. The team finished in 7th place at the 1992 FIBA Europe Under-20 Championship.

== Team results ==
12 July 1992

Boxscore

Romania	67–87	CIS

13 July 1992

Boxscore

CIS	60–61	France

14 July 1992

Boxscore

CIS	105–79	Italy

15 July 1992

Boxscore

Turkey	75–72	CIS

16 July 1992

Boxscore

Belgium	73–89	CIS

18 July 1992

Boxscore

CIS	93–94	Spain

19 July 1992

Boxscore

CIS	107–90	Belgium

== See also ==
- Soviet Union men's national basketball team
- Soviet Union men's national under-18 basketball team
