= 1997 Liga Sudamericana de Básquetbol =

Liga Sudamericana de Básquetbol
- Season: 1997
- Dates: 18 February – 9 May 1997
- Teams: 15

Finals
- Champions: (Argentina) Atenas
- Runners-up: (Brazil) Corinthians
- Semifinalists: (Argentina) Olimpia (Brazil) Cougar Franca

The 1997 Liga Sudamericana de Básquetbol, or 1997 FIBA South American League, was the second edition of the second-tier tournament for professional basketball clubs from South America. The tournament began on 18 February 1997 and finished on 9 May 1997. Argentine club Atenas won the tournament, defeating Brazilian club Corinthians in the Grand Finals.

== Format ==
Teams were split into three groups of four teams each and one group of three teams, and played each other in a home-and-away round-robin format. The top two teams from each group advanced to the final stage, a best-of-three direct playoff elimination where the champion was decided.

== Teams ==
Country	Team
Argentina	Andino Sport Club
Argentina	Atenas
Argentina	Olimpia
Bolivia	Ingavi de La Paz
Brazil	Corinthians
Brazil	Cougar Franca
Brazil	Corinthians de Santa Cruz do Sul
Chile	Español de Talca
Chile	Deportivo Petrox
Colombia	Paisas de Medellín
Colombia	Piratas de Bogotá
Paraguay	Sol de América
Peru	Deportivo SIPESA
Peru	Regatas Lima
Venezuela	Gaiteros del Zulia

== Group stage ==
=== Group A ===
Pos	Team	Pld	W	L	Pts	Qualification	OLI	PET	SOL	ING
1	(Argentina) Olimpia	6	6	0	12	Advances to final stage	—	109–88	105–86	151–88
2	(Chile) Deportivo Petrox	6	3	3	9	Advances to final stage	83–97	—	92–99	127–89
3	(Paraguay) Sol de América	6	2	4	8		94–102	87–105	—	101–90
4	(Bolivia) Ingavi de La Paz	6	1	5	7		101–114	91–106	120–113	—

Source: FIBA Archive

=== Group B ===
Pos	Team	Pld	W	L	Pts	Qualification	FRA	PAI	GAI
1	(Brazil) Cougar Franca	4	4	0	8	Advances to final stage	—	118–83	w/o
2	(Colombia) Paisas de Medellín	4	1	3	5	Advances to final stage	78–108	—	w/o
3	(Venezuela) Gaiteros del Zulia (Note: Gaiteros withdrew from the tournament after playing two matches.)	4	1	3	5		76–86	92–78	—

Source: FIBA Archive

=== Group C ===
Pos	Team	Pld	W	L	Pts	Qualification	COR	AND	REG	ESP
1	(Brazil) Corinthians	6	4	2	10	Advances to final stage	—	99–92	106–84	123–122
2	(Argentina) Sport Club Andino	6	4	2	10	Advances to final stage	87–81	—	94–69	110–81
3	(Peru) Regatas Lima	6	3	3	9		81–74	62–96	—	97–73
4	(Chile) Español de Talca	6	1	5	7		80–81	103–94	54–56	—

Source: FIBA Archive

=== Group D ===
Pos	Team	Pld	W	L	Pts	Qualification	ATE	PIR	COS	SIP
1	(Argentina) Atenas	7	6	1	13	Advances to final stage	—	103–84	98–82	105–46
2	(Colombia) Piratas de Bogotá	6	4	2	10	Advances to final stage	57–77	—	87–79	85–77
3	(Brazil) Corinthians de Santa Cruz do Sul	6	2	4	8		91–103	w/o	—	104–77
4	(Peru) Deportivo SIPESA	6	0	6	6		72–86	65–96	86–96	—

Source: FIBA Archive

== Final stage ==
Quarterfinals
(Brazil) Atenas	2
(Colombia) Paisas de Medellín	0
(Argentina) Olimpia	2
(Argentina) Sport Club Andino	1
(Brazil) Corinthians	2
(Chile) Deportivo Petrox	0
(Brazil) Cougar Franca	2
(Colombia) Piratas de Bogotá	1

Semifinals
(Argentina) Atenas	2
(Argentina) Olimpia	1
(Brazil) Corinthians	2
(Brazil) Cougar Franca	0

Grand Finals
(Argentina) Atenas	2
(Brazil) Corinthians	1

== Finals series ==
The matches were played on 1, 8 and 9 May 1997.

- Corinthians - Atenas 85-82
- Atenas - Corinthians 97-98
- Corinthians - Atenas 80-98

== Finals rosters ==
Atenas Cordoba: Marcelo Milanesio, Greg Dennis, Thomas Jordan, Fabricio Oberto, Diego Osella - Héctor Campana, Leandro Palladino. Coach: Rubén Magnano

Corinthians: Luiz Augusto Zanon, Robyn Davis, Oscar Schmidt, Brasilia, Caio Silveira. Coach: Zé Boquinha

== Season MVP ==
- (United States) Greg Dennis
