= Ferran Martínez =

Spanish basketball player

Personal information
- Born: 25 April 1968 (age 58) Barcelona, Spain
- Listed height: 7 ft 0 in (2.13 m)
- Listed weight: 260 lb (118 kg)

Career information
- NBA draft: 1990: undrafted
- Playing career: 1985–2002
- Position: Power forward / center
- Number: 13

Career history
- 1985–1988: FC Barcelona
- 1988–1989: Grupo IFA
- 1989–1990: FC Barcelona
- 1990–1994: Joventut Badalona
- 1994–1996: FC Barcelona
- 1996–1998: Panathinaikos
- 1998–1999: Peristeri
- 1999–2001: Joventut Badalona
- 2001–2002: Peristeri
- 2002: Fabriano Basket

Career highlights
- FIBA Intercontinental Cup champion (1996); FIBA European Supercup champion (1986); EuroLeague champion (1994); FIBA Saporta Cup champion (1986); FIBA Korać Cup champion (1987); 7× Spanish League champion (1987, 1988, 1990–1992, 1995, 1996); 2× Spanish Cup winner (1987, 1988); Greek League champion (1998)

Ferran Martínez Garriga (born 25 April 1968) is a retired Spanish professional basketball player. At a height of 2.13 m (7 ft 0 in) tall, he played in the power forward and center positions.

== Professional career ==
During his pro club career, Martínez won the EuroLeague championship in 1994, and was the top scorer of the finals. He also won the FIBA Intercontinental Cup championship in 1996.

== National team career ==
Martínez played in 156 games with the senior Spain men's national basketball team at the following tournaments: the 1987 EuroBasket, the 1988 Summer Olympics, the 1989 EuroBasket, the 1990 FIBA World Championship, the 1993 EuroBasket, the 1994 FIBA World Championship, the 1995 EuroBasket, and the 1997 EuroBasket.

== Awards and accomplishments ==
=== Catalonia ===
- Lliga Catalana (Catalan League) (6): (1985–86, 1989–90, 1990–91, 1991–92, 1992–93, 1995–96)

=== Spain ===
- Liga ACB (Spanish League) (7): 1986–87, 1987–88, 1989–90, 1990–91, 1991–92, 1994–95, 1995–96
- Copa del Rey (Spanish King's Cup) (2): 1986–87, 1987–88
- Copa Príncipe de Asturias ACB (Spanish Prince of Asturias' Cup) (2): 1987–88, 1990–91

=== Greece ===
- Greek Basket League (1): 1997–98

=== Europe ===
- FIBA Saporta Cup (1): 1985–86
- FIBA European Super Cup (1): 1986
- FIBA Korać Cup (1): 1986–87
- EuroLeague (1): 1993–94

=== World ===
- FIBA Intercontinental Cup (1): 1996
