= Nikos Oikonomou =

Greek basketball player and coach

Nikos Oikonomou Νίκος Οικονόμου
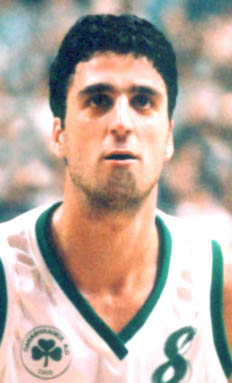
- Nikos Oikonomou, as a player of Panathinaikos.

Ermis Schimatariou
- Title: Head coach
- League: Greek Elite League

Personal information
- Born: February 19, 1973 (age 53) Nikaia, Piraeus, Greece
- Listed height: 6 ft 10 in (2.08 m)
- Listed weight: 240 lb (109 kg)

Career information
- Playing career: 1990–2007
- Position: Power forward
- Number: 8, 11, 14
- Coaching career: 2008–present

Career history

Playing
- 1990–1991: Ionikos Nikaias
- 1991–1999: Panathinaikos
- 1999–2000: Virtus Bologna
- 2000–2001: Olympiacos
- 2001–2002: Barcelona
- 2002–2003: Olympia Larissa
- 2003–2004: Dynamo Moscow
- 2004–2006: Panionios
- 2007: Panellinios

Coaching
- 2008: Spata
- 2008: Ionikos N.F.
- 2008: Olympias Patras
- 2008–2012: Ikaros Kallitheas (assistant)
- 2012–2014: Panionios (assistant)
- 2013–2014: Ikaroi Serron
- 2014–2015: Livadeia
- 2015–2016: Ionikos Nikaias
- 2016–2017: Panionios
- 2018: Apollon Patras
- 2018–2019: Panionios
- 2019–present: Ermis Schimatariou / AGE Chalkida

Career highlights
- As a player: FIBA Intercontinental Cup champion (1996); EuroLeague champion (1996); 4× FIBA EuroStar (1996–1999); 2× Greek League champion (1998, 1999); 2× Greek Cup winner (1993, 1996); All-Greek League Team (2005); 6× Greek All-Star (1996 I, 1996 II, 1998, 2003, 2005, 2006); Greek League Top Scorer (2005); Greek League Hall of Fame (2022); FIBA Europe Under-16 Championship MVP (1989); As a head coach: Greek 2nd Division Champion (2017)
Medals
Men's basketball
Representing Greece
Mediterranean Games
| Silver medal – second place | 1991 Greece | Under-26 |
FIBA Europe Under-20 Championship
| Silver medal – second place | 1992 Greece | Under-20 |
FIBA Europe Under-16 Championship
| Gold medal – first place | 1989 Spain | Under-16 |

Nikolaos "Nikos" Oikonomou (alternate spellings: Ikonomou, Ekonomou) (Greek: Νικόλαος "Νίκος" Οικονόμου; born February 19, 1973) is a former Greek professional basketball player, and a current professional basketball coach for Ermis Schimatariou. During his playing career, the 2.08 m (6 ft 10 in) tall power forward was a four-time FIBA EuroStar selection. He was inducted into the Greek Basket League Hall of Fame in 2022. Oikonomou also runs Basket4All, a basketball camp for young children. He hails from Emmanouil Pappas, Serres.

== Club playing career ==
Oikonomou started his playing career with the Greek club Ionikos Nikaias. From 1991 to 1998, he was a member of the Greek club Panathinaikos. He was one of the leaders of the team for many years. In 1993, he won the Greek Cup with Panathinaikos. He also played in the EuroLeague Final Four, at Tel Aviv, in 1994, and at Saragoza in 1995, coming in 3rd place both times.

In 1996, he won with Panathinaikos, the EuroLeague championship, the Greek Cup, and the FIBA Intercontinental Cup, all in the same year. In 1998, he won with Panathinaikos, the Greek League championship, the first Greek championship of the team since 1984. He then moved to Italy, to play in the Italian League in 1999, where he played with Virtus Bologna, and after a year, he moved from there back to Greece, to play for Olympiacos.

In 2001, he transferred to Spanish club Barcelona of the Spanish League. He later returned to the Greek League to play for Olympia Larissa, and he then left Greece once again, to play in Russia for Dynamo Moscow of the Russian Super League.

He then continued his career playing back in Greece with Panionios, and finally, his last team was the Greek club Panellinios.

== National team career ==
Oikonomou was a longtime member of the senior men's Greek national team. Some of the senior tournaments that he played at were the EuroBasket 1993, where Greece finished in 4th place, the EuroBasket 1995, where Greece again finished in 4th place, and the EuroBasket 1997, where Greece also finished in 4th place.

He also played at the 1996 Summer Olympic Games, where Greece finished in 5th place, and at the 1998 FIBA World Championship, where Greece came in 4th place.

== Coaching career ==
Oikonomou began his basketball coaching career in 2008, when he became the head coach of the local Greek amateur club Spata, of the lower Greek divisions. The next team he coached was Ionikos NF, which was playing in the 4th-tier Greek national amateur level at the time. He was then the head coach of was Olympias Patras, which was competing in the Greek 2nd Division at the time.

He was next an assistant coach, working first as an assistant coach with Ikaros Kallitheas, and then as an assistant coach with Panionios. In 2013, he became the head coach of Ikaroi Serron, which was playing in the Greek 2nd Division at the time. In 2014, he became the head coach of Livadeia, a team that was also playing in Greece's 2nd Division.

He was then the head coach of Ionikos Nikaias, a team that was playing in Greece's 3rd-tier level national semi-pro competition at the time. In 2016, he became the head coach of the Greek 2nd Division club Panionios.

== Awards and accomplishments ==
=== Greek junior national team ===
- 1989 FIBA Europe Under-16 Championship: Gold
- 1989 FIBA Europe Under-16 Championship: All-Tournament Team
- 1989 FIBA Europe Under-16 Championship: MVP
- 1992 FIBA Europe Under-20 Championship: Silver

=== Pro career ===
- 2× Greek Cup Winner: (1993, 1996)
- 6× Greek League All-Star: (1996 I, 1996 II, 1998, 2003, 2005, 2006)
- EuroLeague Champion: (1996)
- FIBA Intercontinental Cup Champion: (1996)
- 4× FIBA EuroStar: (1996, 1997, 1998, 1999)
- 2× Greek League Champion: (1998, 1999)
- Greek League Best Five: (2005)
- Greek Basket League Hall of Fame: (2022)

=== Head coaching career ===
- Greek 2nd Division Champion: (2017)
