= Byron Dinkins =

American basketball player (born 1967)

Personal information
- Born: June 15, 1967 (age 59) Charlotte, North Carolina, U.S.
- Listed height: 1.91 m (6 ft 3 in)
- Listed weight: 170 lb (77 kg)

Career information
- High school: East Mecklenburg (Charlotte, North Carolina)
- College: Charlotte (1985–1989)
- NBA draft: 1989: undrafted
- Playing career: 1989–2005
- Position: Point guard
- Number: 9, 4, 5

Career history
- 1989–1990: Houston Rockets
- 1990: San Antonio Spurs
- 1990–1991: Rapid City Thrillers
- 1991: Indiana Pacers
- 1991–1992: Columbus Horizon
- 1992–1993: Brandt Hagen
- 1993–1995: Rapid City Thrillers
- 1995–1996: Panionios
- 1996–1997: Panathinaikos
- 1998–2000: Iraklis
- 2000–2002: Peristeri
- 2002–2003: Apollon Limassol
- 2004–2005: Carolina Thunder

Career highlights
- FIBA Intercontinental Cup champion (1996); 4× Greek League All-Star (1996 I, 1996 II, 1999, 2001); 2× Greek League assists leader (1996, 2000); Sun Belt Player of the Year (1988); 2× First-team All-Sun Belt (1988, 1989); No. 4 retired by Charlotte 49ers
- Stats at NBA.com
- Stats at Basketball Reference

Byron Stewart Dinkins (born June 15, 1967) is an American former professional basketball player, who played two seasons in the NBA, from 1989 to 1991. He played college basketball for UNC Charlotte. After his stint in the NBA, Dinkins pursued a professional career in Greece.

== College career ==
Dinkins, a 6-foot-1-inch (1.85 m) point guard, that was born in Charlotte, North Carolina, attended and graduated from East Mecklenburg, where he played high school basketball. After high school, Dinkins was recruited to play college basketball by UNC Charlotte. He stayed with the Charlotte 49ers for four seasons, as he averaged 15.5 points per game, 2.8 rebounds per game, 4.8 assists per game, and 1.2 steals per game, in 107 games played.

Dinkins achieved a career-high in scoring, during his junior season, as he averaged 21.4 points per game. Dinkins led his school to the Sun Belt Conference Tournament title. He was also honored as the Sun Belt Player of the Year. Dinkins was also named to the All-Sun Belt Conference First Team in his junior and senior seasons.

== Professional career ==
=== NBA ===
Dinkins played in the NBA, with the Houston Rockets, during the 1989–90 NBA season. He split time with the San Antonio Spurs and Indiana Pacers, during the 1990–91 season. In his NBA career, Dinkins played in a total of 45 games played, and he scored a total of 151 points, for a soring average of 3.4 points per game.

=== Greece ===
Although Dinkins never played for an NBA team after 1991, he did have a prosperous professional club basketball career playing in the Greek League for Peristeri Athens, Panionios Athens, Panathinaikos Athens, and Iraklis Thessaloniki. Dinkins led the Greek League in assists per game, in the 1995–96 season. In the 1996–97 season, he played with Panathinaikos, and in September 1996, he helped them win the 1996 edition of the FIBA Intercontinental Cup.

== Personal life ==
After his basketball playing career ended, Dinkins returned to his birthplace of Charlotte, North Carolina. He now serves as the head coach of the Carmel Christian School varsity boys basketball team, and the middle school's gym teacher. Professional basketball player K. C. Rivers, is his nephew.

== Career statistics ==
Legend
GP	Games played	GS	Games started	MPG	Minutes per game
FG%	Field goal percentage	3P%	3-point field goal percentage	FT%	Free throw percentage
RPG	Rebounds per game	APG	Assists per game	SPG	Steals per game
BPG	Blocks per game	PPG	Points per game	**Bold**	Career high

=== NBA ===
==== Regular season ====
Year	Team	GP	GS	MPG	FG%	3P%	FT%	RPG	APG	SPG	BPG	PPG
1989–90	Houston	**33**	0	11.0	.404	**.111**	.867	**1.2**	**2.3**	**.6**	**.1**	**3.5**
1990–91	San Antonio	10	0	**14.4**	.394	–	**.889**	1.1	1.9	.2	.0	3.4
1990–91	Indiana	2	0	2.5	**1.000**	–	–	.5	.0	.0	.0	1.0
Career		45	0	11.4	.406	.111	.872	1.2	2.1	.5	.0	3.4
