= 1998 FIBA EuroLeague Final Four =

European league basketball contest

Tournament details
- Arena: Palau Sant Jordi; Barcelona, Spain
- Dates: April 1998

Final positions
- Champions: (Italy) Kinder Bologna (1st title)
- Runners-up: (Greece) AEK
- Third place: (Italy) Benetton Treviso
- Fourth place: (Federal Republic of Yugoslavia) Partizan Zepter

Awards and statistics
- MVP: (Federal Republic of Yugoslavia) Zoran Savić

The 1998 FIBA EuroLeague Final Four was the 1997–98 season's FIBA EuroLeague Final Four tournament, organized by FIBA Europe.

Kinder Bologna won its first title, after defeating AEK in the EuroLeague Finals, in the lowest scoring final ever.

== Bracket ==
Semi-finals
(Federal Republic of Yugoslavia) Partizan Zepter	61
(Italy) Kinder Bologna	83
(Italy) Benetton Treviso	66
(Greece) AEK	69

Final
(Italy) Kinder Bologna	58
(Greece) AEK	44
Third place
(Federal Republic of Yugoslavia) Partizan Zepter	89
(Italy) Benetton Treviso	96

== Semifinals ==
=== Partizan Zepter – Kinder Bologna ===
April 21
18:15

Boxscore

Partizan Zepter (Federal Republic of Yugoslavia)	61–83	(Italy) Kinder Bologna
Scoring by half: 25–45, 36–38
Pts: Brkić 17; Rebs: Lukovski 10; Asts: Brkić 2		Pts: Savić 23; Rebs: Abbio 5 Asts: Danilović 6

Palau Sant Jordi, Barcelona
Attendance: 9,000
Referees: Miguel Ángel Betancor (ESP), Armand De Keyser (BEL)

=== Benetton Treviso – AEK ===
April 21
20:30

Boxscore

Benetton Treviso (Italy)	66–69	(Greece) AEK
Scoring by half: 36–37, 30–32
Pts: Williams 19; Rebs: Rebrača, Rusconi 5 Asts: Bonora 5		Pts: Anderson 21; Rebs: Andersen 7 Asts: three players 2

Palau Sant Jordi, Barcelona
Attendance: 10,500
Referees: Iztok Rems (SLO), Romualdas Brazauskas (LTU)

== Third Place Game ==
April 23
18:15

Boxscore

Partizan Zepter (Federal Republic of Yugoslavia)	89–96	(Italy) Benetton Treviso
Scoring by half: 46–54, 43–42
Pts: Drobnjak 22; Rebs: Tomašević 12; Asts: Lukovski 3		Pts: Williams 24; Rebs: Sciarra 7 Asts: four players 2

Palau Sant Jordi, Barcelona
Attendance: 11,900
Referees: Romualdas Brazauskas (LTU), Armand De Keyser (BEL)

== Final ==
April 23
20:30

Boxscore

Kinder Bologna (Italy)	58–44	(Greece) AEK
Scoring by half: 28–20, 30–24
Pts: Rigaudeau 14; Rebs: Nesterović 9 Asts: Abbio, Sconochini 2		Pts: Lasa 7 Rebs: Tsakalidis 6 Asts: Lasa, Prelević 3

Palau Sant Jordi, Barcelona
Attendance: 11,900
Referees: Miguel Ángel Betancor (ESP), Iztok Rems (SLO)

Kinder Bologna	AEK

Starters:			P	R	A
PG	14	(France) Antoine Rigaudeau	14	2	0
SG	5	(Federal Republic of Yugoslavia) Saša Danilović (C)	13	5	1
SF	10	(Argentina) Hugo Sconochini	10	8	2
PF	12	(Federal Republic of Yugoslavia) Zoran Savić	7	6	0
C	8	(Slovenia) Rašo Nesterović	6	9	0
Reserves:			P	R	A
SG	6	(Italy) Claudio Crippa	DNP		
SG	7	(Italy) Alessandro Abbio	6	1	2
C	11	(Italy) Augusto Binelli	2	1	0
PF	12	(Italy) Riccardo Morandotti	DNP		
PF	15	(Italy) Alessandro Frosini	0	0	0
Head coach:
(Italy) Ettore Messina

1997–98 FIBA EuroLeague
Champions

Kinder Bologna
First Title

Starters:			P	R	A
PG	4	(Italy) Claudio Coldebella	3	1	0
SG	7	(Federal Republic of Yugoslavia) Bane Prelević (C)	6	0	3
SF	8	(United States) Willie Anderson	4	4	1
PF	15	(United States) Victor Alexander	5	5	0
C	12	(Greece) Jake Tsakalidis	4	6	1
Reserves:			P	R	A
PG	5	(Spain) José Lasa	7	1	3
SG	9	(Greece) Nikos Chatzis	4	2	1
C	10	(Denmark) Mikkel Larsen	2	0	0
PF	11	(Greece) Michalis Kakiouzis	5	2	0
C	14	(Denmark) Michael Andersen	4	4	0
Head coach:
(Greece) Giannis Ioannidis

== Awards ==
=== FIBA EuroLeague Final Four MVP ===
- (Federal Republic of Yugoslavia) Zoran Savić (Virtus Bologna)

=== FIBA EuroLeague Finals Top Scorer ===
- (France) Antoine Rigaudeau (Virtus Bologna)

=== FIBA EuroLeague All-Final Four Team ===
FIBA EuroLeague All-Final Four Team
Player	Team	Ref.
(France) Antoine Rigaudeau	Kinder Bologna	
(Federal Republic of Yugoslavia) Saša Danilović	Kinder Bologna	
(United States) Henry Williams	Benetton Treviso	
(Federal Republic of Yugoslavia) Dejan Tomašević	Partizan Zepter	
(Federal Republic of Yugoslavia) Zoran Savić (MVP)	Kinder Bologna	
