= Jorge Racca =

Argentine-Italian basketball player

Personal information
- Born: September 4, 1971 (age 55) General Pico, La Pampa, Argentina
- Listed height: 6 ft 6 in (1.98 m)
- Listed weight: 218 lb (99 kg)

Career information
- Playing career: 1992–2007
- Position: Shooting guard / small forward

Career history
- 1992–1993: Regatas San Nicolás
- 1993–1994: Boca Juniors
- 1994–1997: Olimpia
- 1997–1998: Quilmes
- 1998–2000: Gran Canaria
- 2000–2001: PAOK
- 2001–2002: Pico
- 2002–2004: Breogán
- 2004–2005: Tenerife
- 2006: Viola Reggio Calabria
- 2007: Olimpia

Career highlights
- Spanish League All-Star (1999); FIBA South American League champion (1996); FIBA South American League MVP (1996); Argentina League champion (1996); 2× Argentine League MVP (1996, 1997); Argentine League Finals MVP (1996); Argentine League Best Sixth Man (1995); 5× Argentine League All-Star (1991, 1992, 1993, 1996, 1997); Argentine All-Star Game Slam Dunk champion (1992); Argentine All-Star Game 3 Point Shootout champion (1997)
Medals
Men's basketball
Representing Argentina
FIBA AmeriCup
Silver medal – second place	1995 Argentina
Pan American Games
Gold medal – first place	1995 Argentina
FIBA South American Championship
Silver medal – second place	1993 Brazil

Jorge Oscar Racca (born September 4, 1971, in General Pico, La Pampa, Argentina) is an Argentine-Italian retired male professional basketball player. At 6 ft 6 in (1.98 m) and 218 pounds (99 kg), he played at the shooting guard and small forward positions. Nicknamed "Pampa" during his career, Racca was a member of Argentina's national basketball team at the 1996 Summer Olympics.

== Professional career ==
Racca was named the MVP of the Argentine League Finals in 1996, and the season's league MVP of the Argentine League in 1996, and 1997, while he was playing with Olimpia de Venado Tuerto. In his most productive season, with Canarias Telecom in the Spanish professional league Liga ACB, Racca averaged 17.4 points per game over 32 games in 1999–2000. Racca holds the Argentine national league record in field goals per game, with 23.24 (7,227 in 311 games). He was also named the MVP of the FIBA South American League in 1996.

== National team career ==
Racca played with the senior men's Argentine national basketball team at the 1994 FIBA World Championship. He won a gold medal with Argentina at the 1995 Pan American Games.

He also played with Argentina at the 1996 Summer Olympic Games in Atlanta, Georgia, where Argentina finished in ninth place in the overall standings. Racca wore uniform number 9.

At the Summer Games in 1996, Argentina competed in seven games, finishing with a record of 3–4.

20 Jul. 1996	vs USA	68-96
22 Jul. 1996	vs LTU	65-61
24 Jul. 1996	vs CHN	77-87
26 Jul. 1996	vs CRO	75-90
28 Jul. 1996	vs ANG	66-62
30 Jul. 1996	vs KOR	97-79
2 Aug. 1996	vs PUR	87-77

In a loss to the United States (The Dream Team) 96–68, Racca tallied 6 points, 3 rebounds, and 2 assists. In six games at the Olympics, Racca averaged 7.2 points, 3 rebounds, and 2 assists in 21.3 minutes per game.
