= Hugo Sconochini =

Argentine basketball player

Personal information
- Born: 10 April 1971 (age 55) Cañada de Gómez, Santa Fe, Argentina
- Listed height: 6 ft 4.5 in (1.94 m)
- Listed weight: 223 lb (101 kg)

Career information
- Playing career: 1989–2012
- Position: Shooting guard / Small forward
- Number: 10

Career history
- 1989–1990: Sport Club Cañadense
- 1990–1993: Panasonic Reggio Calabria
- 1993–1995: Olimpia Milano
- 1995–1996: Nuova Tirrena Roma
- 1996–1997: Panathinaikos
- 1997–2001: Kinder Bologna
- 2001–2002: Tau Cerámica
- 2002–2004: Olimpia Milano
- 2004–2006: Lottomatica Roma
- 2007–2009: UC Piacentina
- 2009–2010: Gamma Marconi Segrate
- 2010–2012: Bettinzoli Monticelli

Career highlights
- FIBA Intercontinental Cup champion (1996); 2× EuroLeague champion (1998, 2001); Spanish League champion (2002); Spanish Cup winner (2002); 2× Italian League champion (1998, 2001); 2× Italian Cup winner (1999, 2001)
Medals
Men's basketball
Representing Argentina
Olympic Games
| Gold medal – first place | 2004 Athens |
FIBA World Cup
| Silver medal – second place | 2002 Indianapolis |
FIBA Diamond Ball
| Bronze medal – third place | 2004 Serbia |
Goodwill Games
| Silver medal – second place | 2001 Australia |
FIBA AmeriCup
| Gold medal – first place | 2001 Neuquén |
| Bronze medal – third place | 1999 San Juan |
FIBA South American Championship
| Gold medal – first place | 2001 Chile |
FIBA Americas Under-20 Championship
| Gold medal – first place | 1993 Argentina |
FIBA South American Under-17 Championship
| Gold medal – first place | 1988 Argentina |

Hugo Ariel Sconochini (born 10 April 1971) is an Argentine retired professional basketball player. He played at the shooting guard and small forward positions. During his professional club career, Sconochini won the FIBA Intercontinental Cup championship in 1996, and two EuroLeague championships, in 1998 and 2001.

He was also a member of the senior Argentine national team that won the gold medal at the 2004 Athens Summer Olympic Games.

== Professional career ==
In the 1996–97 season, Sconochini played with the Greek Basket League club Panathinaikos Athens. With Panathinaikos, he won the 1996 edition of the FIBA Intercontinental Cup. As a member of Virtus Bologna, Sconochini won the Italian League championship in 1998 and 2001, and the Italian Cup title in 1999 and 2001 with Bologna. With Bologna, Sconochini also won the EuroLeague championship at both the 1998 EuroLeague Final Four and the 2001 EuroLeague Finals. As a member Baskonia, Sconochini won the Spanish League championship and the Spanish Cup title in the year 2002.

== National team career ==
Sconochini was a regular member of the senior men's Argentine national team. He was a part of Argentina's "Golden Generation". With Argentina, he played at the 1998 FIBA World Championship. He won a bronze medal with Argentina at the 1999 FIBA Americas Championship.

Sconochini also won gold medals with Argentina at the 2001 FIBA South American Championship and the 2001 FIBA Americas Championship. He also won a silver medal with Argentina at the 2002 FIBA World Championship. In addition to that, Sconochini was a member of Argentina's gold medal-winning team at the 2004 Summer Olympics.
