= Lucas Victoriano =

Argentine-Spanish basketball player

Personal information
- Born: November 5, 1977 (age 49) Tucumán, Argentina
- Listed height: 6 ft 3 in (1.91 m)
- Listed weight: 201 lb (91 kg)

Career information
- Playing career: 1995–2014
- Position: Point guard

Career history
- 1995–1997: Olimpia Venado Tuerto
- 1997–1998: Real Canoe NC
- 1998–2002: Real Madrid
- 1999–2000: → Caprabo Lleida
- 2000–2001: → Belgrano Tucumán
- 2001: → Bingo Snai Montecatini
- 2001–2002: → Caprabo Lleida
- 2002–2004: Real Madrid
- 2004–2005: Casademont Girona
- 2005–2006: Eurorida Scafati
- 2006–2009: CAI Zaragoza
- 2009–2011: Lanús
- 2011–2012: Club San Martín de Corrientes
- 2013–2014: Club Atlético Independiente de Tucumán
Medals
Men's basketball
Representing Argentina
FIBA World Cup
| Silver medal – second place | 2002 Indianapolis |
FIBA AmeriCup
| Gold medal – first place | 2001 Neuquén |
| Silver medal – second place | 2003 San Juan |
FIBA South American Championship
| Silver medal – second place | 1999 Bahía Blanca |
| Gold medal – first place | 2001 Valdivia |

Lucas Javier Victoriano Acosta (born November 5, 1977, in Tucumán) is a former Argentine-Spanish professional basketball player.

== Professional career ==
In his pro career, Victoriano played in the Argentine League, the Spanish League, the Italian League, and the EuroLeague.

== National team career ==
Victoriano was a member of the senior Argentine national basketball team. With Argentina, he played at the following tournaments: the 1999 South American Championship, where he won a silver medal, the 2001 South American Championship, where he won a gold medal, the 2001 FIBA Americas Championship, where he won a gold medal, the 2002 FIBA World Cup, where he won a silver medal, and the 2003 FIBA Americas Championship, where he won a silver medal

== Honours ==
=== Pro clubs ===
- Italian 2nd Division Champion: (1)
  - 2006

=== Argentine national team ===
- 1999 South American Championship: Silver
- 2001 South American Championship: Gold
- 2001 FIBA Americas Championship: Gold
- 2002 FIBA World Cup: Silver
- 2003 FIBA Americas Championship: Silver
