= Alejandro Montecchia =

Argentine basketball player

Personal information
- Born: January 1, 1972 (age 54) Bahía Blanca, Argentina
- Listed height: 6 ft 0 in (1.83 m)
- Listed weight: 190 lb (86 kg)

Career information
- Playing career: 1994–2009
- Position: Point guard

Career history
- 1994–1998: Olimpia de Venado Tuerto (Argentina)
- 1998–1999: Boca Juniors (Argentina)
- 1999–2002: Viola Reggio Calabria (Italy)
- 2002–2005: Pamesa Valencia (Spain)
- 2006: Armani Jeans Milano (Italy)
- 2006–2009: Regatas Corrientes (Argentina)

Career highlights
- EuroCup champion (2003); FIBA South American League champion (1996); FIBA South American League MVP (2008); Argentine League champion (1996)
Medals
Men's basketball
Representing Argentina
Summer Olympic Games
Gold medal – first place	2004 Athens
FIBA World Cup
Silver medal – second place	2002 Indianapolis
FIBA AmeriCup
Silver medal – second place	2003 San Juan
Bronze medal – third place	1999 San Juan
FIBA South American Championship
Gold medal – first place	2001 Valdivia

Alejandro Ariel Montecchia (born 1 January 1972) is an Argentine retired professional basketball player. He played at the point guard position.

== Professional career ==
In his pro career, Montecchia won the South American League and Argentine League championships in 1996. He also won the European-wide 2nd-tier level EuroCup championship in the 2002–03 season. He was the South American League's MVP in 2008.

== National team career ==
Montecchia was a regular on Argentina's senior national team, with which he won a gold medal at the 2004 Summer Olympic Games.
