= Todd Jadlow =

American former professional basketball player

Personal information
- Born: April 26, 1966 (age 60) Salina, Kansas
- Listed height: 6 ft 9 in (2.06 m)
- Listed weight: 235 lb (107 kg)

Career information
- High school: Sacred Heart (Salina, Kansas)
- College: Barton CC (1984–1985); Indiana (1985–1989)
- NBA draft: 1989: undrafted
- Playing career: 1989–2002
- Position: Center / power forward

Todd Michael Jadlow (born April 26, 1966) is an American former professional basketball player. He played the center and forward positions. 6'9" tall, he played collegiately for the Indiana University (Bloomington) Hoosiers from 1985 to 1989 and was a member of Coach Bob Knight's junior college recruits and one of Knight's all-time favorite players.

== Career ==
At Indiana University, Jadlow saw action in a total of 84 games, averaging 6.8 points as well as 3.5 rebounds per contest. He won the 1987 NCAA Division I Men's Basketball National Championship with the Hoosiers, but did not appear in the championship game against Syracuse.

Of all of Knight's former players, Jadlow might have taken the Coach's dismissal from IU his hardest. "I don't know what I'm going to do with all my Indiana stuff," Jadlow said after Knight's firing. "I'm sure not going to be wearing anything Indiana. For the first time in my life I'm ashamed to say that I'm a graduate of Indiana." He went on to say: "I, personally, don't believe the two-faced [IU] administration… It's just sad the way things transpired. This is a guy [Knight] who should have a monument of him erected."

Out of college, Jadlow played for the Pensacola Tornados in the CBA in 1989–90, but also spent time with French LNB side Caen BC the same season, averaging 25.4 points and 7.7 rebounds a game for Caen. In 1990–91 (Bellinzona Basket) and 1991–92 (Fribourg Olympic Basket), Jadlow played in Switzerland. With Fribourg, playing for coach Joe Whelton, he captured the 1992 Swiss national championship title. In 1992–93, Jadlow had stints at Telindus Oostende in Belgium and Berck in France. Later in his playing career, he turned out for Estudiantes de Bahía Blanca and Olímpia de Venado Tuerto in Argentina, winning the 1996 Argentina championship. Jadlow was a member of USBL's Salina Cagerz in the late 1990s.

== Profile ==
Season Rankings
	Game	Minutes	Field Goals	Field Goal Attempts	Three Pointers	Free Throws	Free Throw Attempts	Rebounds	Fouls	Assists	TO	Blocks	Points
Barton County Community College	1984–85	27	132	271	126	164	181	80	51	53	10	30	390
Indiana University	1985–86	22	23	45	12	23	32	39	6	19	5	7	58
Indiana University	1986–87	Redshirt											
Indiana University	1987–88	28	49	93	0	0	56	69	89	67	6	24	154
Indiana University	1988–89	34	113	229	0	0	133	184	172	96	12	58	359

== Other ==
Jadlow was portrayed by Mike Weekes in the 2002 Television video A Season on the Brink. The movie was about "A Year with Bob Knight and the Indiana Hoosiers" is based on the best-selling book by John Feinstein. The movie chronicles Indiana's 1985–86 season, when Knight granted Feinstein unprecedented access to the team and its practices, meetings, and huddles." It was the first ESPN film. The movie would achieve fair reviews. For instance, On the IMDb most found the film as: A Final Four performance, if not better". Also on the site it received a 4.9/10 average of ratings. It was directed by Robert Mandel.

Todd Jadlow went on to return to his roots in Salina, Kansas. There he worked as the local 'celebrity' at a bank and on the end of the bench of the USBL Kansas Cagerz.

After writing a book, Jadlow: On the Rebound, Jadlow appeared with Jim Rome on his radio show on CBS Sports Radio on October 27, 2016, to discuss his time as a Hoosier. In the book Jadlow accuses Knight of emotional and physical abuse, claiming Knight had grabbed him and other players by the genitals and also enclosing a picture, showing fingerprints on his abdomen, which he claims was done by Knight. Despite the alleged abuse, Jadlow still considers himself a Knight fan and supporter. He also discusses in his book his struggles with substance abuse and his time spent in prison.
