= 1992 FIBA Europe Under-20 Championship =

International basketball competition

1992 FIBA U20 European Championship
1st FIBA Under-20 European Basketball Championship

Tournament details
- Host country: Greece
- Dates: 12–19 July 1992
- Teams: 12 (from 1 federation)
- Venue: (in 1 host city)

Final positions
- Champions: Italy (1st title)

Tournament statistics
- Top scorer: (Romania) Mureșan (23.3)
- PPG (Team): CIS (87.6)

The 1992 FIBA Europe Under-20 Championship (known at that time as 1992 European Championship for Men 'Under22 and Under') was the first edition of the FIBA Europe Under-20 Championship. The city of Athens, in Greece, hosted the tournament. Italy won their first title.

== Teams ==
- Belgium
- CIS
- Czechoslovakia
- France
- Germany
- Greece
- Israel
- Italy
- Romania
- Spain
- Poland
- Turkey

== Preliminary round ==
The twelve teams were allocated in two groups of six teams each.

=== Group A ===
Team	Pld	W	L	PF	PA	PD	Pts	Qualification
Italy	5	4	1	412	371	+41	9	Advanced to Semifinals
France	5	3	2	318	309	+9	8 (Note: CIS 60–61 FRA)	Advanced to Semifinals
CIS	5	3	2	413	355	+58	8	Competed in 5th–8th playoffs
Belgium	5	2	3	324	376	−52	7 (Note: TUR 65–72 BEL)	Competed in 5th–8th playoffs
Turkey	5	2	3	349	380	−31	7	Competed in 9th–12th playoffs
Romania	5	1	4	347	372	−25	6	Competed in 9th–12th playoffs

Notes:

12 July
Italy	86–65	Turkey	Athens
Belgium	64–61	France	Athens
Romania	67–87	CIS	Athens
13 July
Italy	92–64	Belgium	Athens
Romania	78–83	Turkey	Athens
CIS	60–61	France	Athens
14 July
Romania	56–64	France	Athens
Turkey	65–72	Belgium	Athens
CIS	105–79	Italy	Athens
15 July
Romania	69–51	Belgium	Athens
Turkey	75–72	CIS	Athens
France	60–68	Italy	Athens
16 July
Belgium	73–89	CIS	Athens
France	72–61	Turkey	Athens
Romania	77–87	Italy	Athens

=== Group B ===
Team	Pld	W	L	PF	PA	PD	Pts	Qualification
Greece	5	5	0	383	337	+46	10	Advanced to Semifinals
Israel	5	4	1	399	356	+43	9	Advanced to Semifinals
Czechoslovakia	5	3	2	358	365	−7	8	Competed in 5th–8th playoffs
Spain	5	1	4	383	400	−17	6 (Note: ESP 1–1 (+4); POL 1–1 (−1); GER 1–1 (−3))	Competed in 5th–8th playoffs
Poland	5	1	4	353	388	−35	6	Competed in 9th–12th playoffs
Germany	5	1	4	340	370	−30	6	Competed in 9th–12th playoffs

Notes:

12 July
Israel	86–74	Spain	Athens
Greece	76–63	Czechoslovakia	Athens
Poland	70–73	Germany	Athens
13 July
Israel	74–60	Czechoslovakia	Athens
Greece	75–59	Poland	Athens
Spain	68–62	Germany	Athens
14 July
Israel	76–64	Germany	Athens
Czechoslovakia	66–59	Poland	Athens
Spain	81–84	Greece	Athens
15 July
Czechoslovakia	81–75	Spain	Athens
Greece	68–60	Germany	Athens
Israel	89–78	Poland	Athens
16 July
Germany	81–88	Czechoslovakia	Athens
Poland	87–85	Spain	Athens
Greece	80–74	Israel	Athens

== Knockout stage ==
=== 9th–12th playoffs ===
Playoffs
18 July, Athens
Poland	75
Romania	87
18 July, Athens
Turkey	104
Germany	70

Ninth place
19 July, Athens
Romania	81
Turkey	69
Eleventh place
19 July, Athens
Poland	82
Germany	60

=== 5th–8th playoffs ===
Playoffs
18 July, Athens
Spain	94
CIS	93
18 July, Athens
Czechoslovakia	64
Belgium	63

Fifth place
19 July, Athens
Spain	66
Czechoslovakia	74
Seventh place
19 July, Athens
CIS	107
Belgium	90

=== Championship ===
Semifinals
18 July, Athens
Greece	82
France	51
18 July, Athens
Israel	83
Italy	101

Final
19 July, Athens
Greece	63
Italy	65
Third place
19 July, Athens
France	63
Israel	60

1992 FIBA Europe U-20 Championship

Italy
First title

== Final standings ==
Rank	Team
Gold medal	Italy
Silver medal	Greece
Bronze medal	France
4th	Israel
5th	Czechoslovakia
6th	Spain
7th	CIS
8th	Belgium
9th	Romania
10th	Turkey
11th	Poland
12th	Germany
