= Liga Sudamericana de Baloncesto =

Liga Sudamericana de Baloncesto South American Basketball League
- Founded: 1996; 30 years ago
- First season: 1996
- Country: ABASU members
- Confederation: FIBA Americas
- Number of teams: 10
- Level on pyramid: 2 (1996–2000, 2008–Present); 1 (2000–2007)
- Promotion to: BCL Americas
- Current champions: (Argentina) Ferro Carril Oeste (1st title)
- Most championships: (Argentina) Atenas (Brazil) Brasília (3 titles each)
- TV partners: DirecTV
- Website: www.fiba.basketball/en/events/liga-sudamericana-de-baloncesto-fiba-2026
- 2026 Liga Sudamericana de Básquetbol

The Liga Sudamericana de Baloncesto (LSB), or FIBA Liga Sudamericana de Baloncesto (Portuguese: Liga Sul-Americana de Basquete, English: South American Basketball League), also commonly known as FIBA South American League, is the second-tier level South American professional basketball competition at the club level, with the first-tier level now considered the panamerican competition of the Champions League. The competition is organized by the South American Basketball Association (ABASU), which operates as a regional sub-zone of FIBA Americas, following the dissolution of the South American Basketball Confederation (CONSUBASQUET). The winner of each year's competition gets a place at the upcoming edition of the Basketball Champions League Americas.

The league usually includes some national domestic champions, and some runners-up, from the best national leagues and basketball countries on the South American continent. Depending on the country, places may be awarded on the basis of performance in the previous season's national domestic league, or over the previous two or three national domestic seasons. The tournament has been played since 1996, aside from 2003, 2020 and 2021.

== History ==
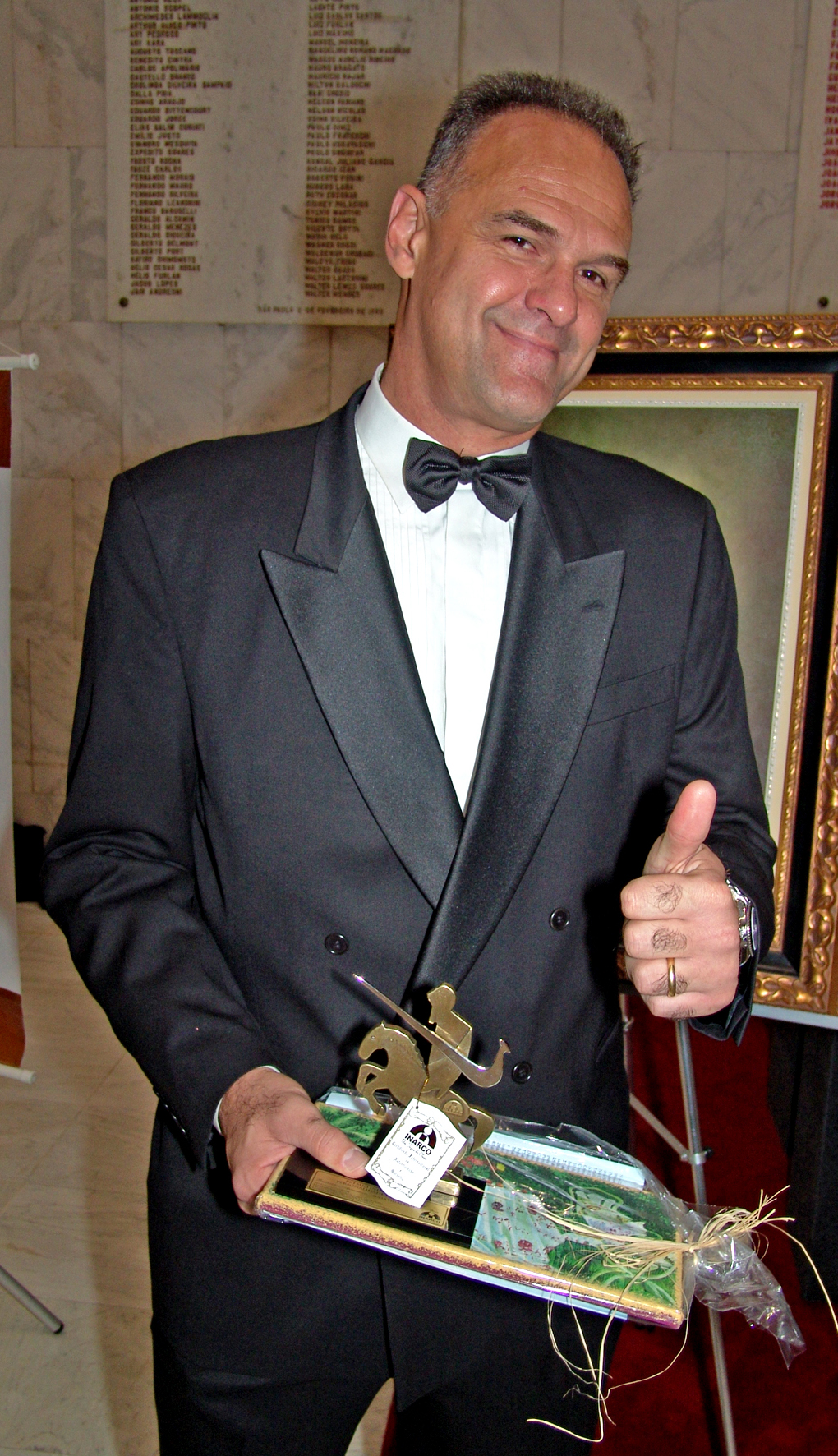
Basketball's 2nd all-time top scorer, Oscar Schmidt, played in the FIBA South American League Grand Finals twice, in 1996 and 1997.

The South American Championship of Champions Clubs, which was founded in 1946, was the first international club tournament played between basketball clubs from South America, and it was the first-tier and most important club competition in South America. In 1993, the Pan American Club Championship was launched including also Central American teams and was held annually until 2000.
The FIBA South American League was founded in 1996 and became the top South American competition, with the historical South American Basketball Championship becoming now the second tier. The champions of the FIBA South American League would automatically earn a spot to the biennial World club competition of the McDonald's Championship which was supported by FIBA. Atenas in 1997 and Vasco da Gama in 1999 were the only two teams that represented South America in the competition which also included NBA champions. Atenas also represented South America as champions in the 1996 FIBA Intercontinental Cup.

With the emergence of the new panamerican competition called the FIBA Americas League, in December 2007, the FIBA South American League became the second-tier international club championship in South America, beginning with the 2008 edition of the competition. The winner was also allocated a spot in the following year's FIBA Americas League.

On 24 September 2019, FIBA launched the competition, which derives its name and branding from the European Basketball Champions League. The competition replaced the FIBA Americas League as premier league in the Americas. The competition will consist of twelve teams, which have to qualify through their domestic leagues. The inaugural season is expected to start in October 2019.

The 2020 and 2021 seasons were cancelled because of the effects of the COVID-19 pandemic. In 2022, the league returned.

=== FIBA South American League levels on the South American pyramid ===
- 1st-tier: (2001 – 2007)
- 2nd-tier: (1996 – 2000, 2008 – Present)

=== Names of the top-tier level South American / Latin American competition ===
- CONSUBASQUET era: (1946–2007)
  - Campeonato Sudamericano de Clubes Campeones de Básquetbol (English: South American Basketball Championship of Champions Clubs): (1946–1992)
  - Campeonato Panamericano de Clubes de Básquetbol (English: Pan American Basketball Club Championship): (1993–2000)
  - Liga Sudamericana de Básquetbol (LSB) (English: South American Basketball League): (2001–2007)
- FIBA Americas era: (2007–present)
  - FIBA Americas League: (2007 – 2019)
  - Basketball Champions League Americas: (2019 – present)

== Title holders ==
- 1996 (Argentina) Olimpia
- 1997 (Argentina) Atenas
- 1998 (Argentina) Atenas
- 1999 (Brazil) Vasco da Gama
- 2000 (Brazil) Vasco da Gama
- 2001 (Argentina) Estudiantes
- 2002 (Argentina) Libertad
- 2003 Not held
- 2004 (Argentina) Atenas
- 2005 (Brazil) Unitri Uberlândia
- 2006 (Argentina) Ben Hur
- 2007 (Argentina) Libertad
- 2008 (Argentina) Regatas Corrientes
- 2009 (Brazil) Flamengo (I)
- 2009 (Argentina) Quimsa (II)
- 2010 (Brazil) Brasília
- 2011 (Argentina) Obras Sanitarias
- 2012 (Argentina) Regatas Corrientes
- 2013 (Brazil) Brasília
- 2014 (Brazil) Bauru
- 2015 (Brazil) Brasília
- 2016 (Brazil) Mogi das Cruzes
- 2017 (Venezuela) Guaros de Lara
- 2018 (Brazil) Franca
- 2019 (Brazil) Botafogo
- 2022 (Brazil) Bauru
- 2023 (Argentina) Instituto
- 2024 (Uruguay) Nacional
- 2025 (Argentina) Ferro Carril Oeste

== Grand Finals ==
Year	Grand Final			Semifinalists	
Year	Champion	Score	Second place	Third place	Fourth place
1996; Details	(Argentina); Olimpia BBC	2–0 series	(Brazil); Corinthians	(Brazil); Dharma Yara Franca	(Brazil); Rio Claro Basquete
1997; Details	(Argentina); Atenas	2–1 series	(Brazil); Corinthians	(Argentina); Olimpia BBC	(Brazil); Marathon Franca
1998; Details	(Argentina); Atenas	2–0 series	(Brazil); Marathon Franca	(Argentina); Boca Juniors	(Argentina); Independent de General Pico
1999; Details	(Brazil); Vasco da Gama	2–0 Series	(Argentina); Boca Juniors	(Argentina); Independent de General Pico	(Uruguay); Welcome
2000; Details	(Brazil); Vasco da Gama	3–2 series	(Argentina); Atenas	(Brazil); Marathon Franca	(Uruguay); Welcome
2001; Details	(Argentina); Estudiantes de Olavarría	3–1 series	(Argentina); GECR	(Argentina); Atenas	(Brazil); Flamengo
2002; Details	(Argentina); Libertad de Sunchales	3–1 series	(Brazil); Vasco da Gama	(Venezuela); Cocodrilos de Caracas	(Argentina); Estudiantes de Olavarría
2004; Details	(Argentina); Atenas	3–2 series	(Brazil); Unitri Uberlândia	(Argentina); Boca Juniors	(Argentina); Libertad
2005; Details	(Brazil); Unitri Uberlândia	3–1 series	(Brazil); Universo Ajax	(Argentina); Boca Juniors	(Venezuela); Cocodrilos de Caracas
2006; Details	(Argentina); Ben Hur	3–1 series	(Brazil); COC Ribeirão Preto	(Brazil); Unitri Uberlândia	(Argentina); Libertad
2007; Details	(Argentina); Libertad de Sunchales	3–2 series	(Brazil); Unimed Franca	(Argentina); Ben Hur	(Argentina); GECR
2008; Details	(Argentina); Regatas Corrientes	3–2 series	(Brazil); Flamengo	(Argentina); Boca Juniors	(Brazil); Lobos Brasília
2009 (I); Details	(Brazil); Flamengo	Final group	(Argentina); Quimsa	(Colombia); Norte	(Argentina); Regatas Corrientes
2009 (II); Details	(Argentina); Quimsa	Final group	(Argentina); Libertad de Sunchales	(Argentina); Juventud Sionista	(Brazil); Minas Tênis Clube
2010; Details	(Brazil); Lobos Brasília	98-86	(Brazil); Flamengo	(Argentina); Boca Juniors	(Argentina); Quimsa
2011; Details	(Argentina); Obras Sanitarias	88-73	(Brazil); Pinheiros Sky	(Brazil); Lobos Brasília	(Argentina); Atenas
2012; Details	(Argentina); Regatas Corrientes	Final group	(Brazil); Lobos Brasília	(Brazil); Flamengo	(Argentina); Peñarol de Mar del Plata
2013; Details	(Brazil); Lobos Brasília	93–81	(Uruguay); Aguada	(Brazil); Paschoalotto Bauru	(Argentina); Boca Juniors
2014; Details	(Brazil); Paschoalotto Bauru	79–53	(Brazil); Mogi das Cruzes	(Argentina); Boca Juniors	(Uruguay); Malvín
2015; Details	(Brazil); Brasília	2–0 series	(Argentina); San Martín de Corrientes	Semifinal groups	
2016; Details	(Brazil); Mogi das Cruzes	3–0 series	(Argentina); Bahía Basket	Semifinal groups	
2017; Details	(Venezuela); Guaros de Lara	3–1 series	(Argentina); Estudiantes Concordia	Semifinal groups	
2018; Details	(Brazil); Franca	2–1 series	(Argentina); Instituto	Semifinal groups	
2019; Details	(Brazil); Botafogo	2–1 series	(Brazil); Corinthians	Semifinal groups	
2020	Not played due to the COVID-19 pandemic				
2021	Not played due to the COVID-19 pandemic				
2022; Details	(Brazil); Bauru	66–57	(Argentina); San Martín de Corrientes	(Colombia); Titanes de Barranquilla	(Argentina); Oberá
2023; Details	(Argentina); Instituto	81–72	(Colombia); Titanes de Barranquilla	(Argentina); Gimnasia y Esgrima (CR)	(Colombia); Caribbean Storm
2024; Details	(Uruguay); Nacional	77–76 (OT)	(Argentina); San Lorenzo	(Argentina); Ciclista Olímpico	(Uruguay); Defensor Sporting
2025; Details	(Argentina); Ferro Carril Oeste	85–68	(Argentina); Regatas Corrientes	(Uruguay); Defensor Sporting	(Paraguay); Olimpia Kings

== Titles by club ==
Titles	Club	Years
3	(Argentina) Atenas	1997, 1998, 2004
3	(Brazil) Lobos Brasília	2010, 2013, 2015
2	(Brazil) Vasco da Gama	1999, 2000
2	(Brazil) Bauru	2014, 2022
2	(Argentina) Libertad	2002, 2007
2	(Argentina) Regatas Corrientes	2008, 2012
1	(Argentina) Olimpia	1996
1	(Argentina) Estudiantes	2001
1	(Brazil) Uberlândia	2005
1	(Argentina) Ben Hur	2006
1	(Brazil) Flamengo	2009 (I)
1	(Argentina) Quimsa	2009 (II)
1	(Argentina) Obras Sanitarias	2011
1	(Brazil) Mogi das Cruzes	2016
1	(Venezuela) Guaros de Lara	2017
1	(Brazil) Franca	2018
1	(Brazil) Botafogo	2019
1	(Argentina) Instituto	2023
1	(Uruguay) Nacional	2024
1	(Argentina) Ferro Carril Oeste	2025

== Titles by country ==
Titles	Country
14	Argentina
12	Brazil
1	Venezuela
1	Uruguay

== Statistical leaders per season ==
The season usually started in February and ended in May until 2009 (I). Then after the South American Champions Cup folded, it to moved to October until November.

=== Top scorers ===
Since the beginning of the 1996 season (Points Per Game):

- 2007 (United States) Cleotis Brown III (Libertad de Sunchales): 17.4
- 2008 (Uruguay) (Italy) Leandro García Morales (Club Atlético Aguada): 23.5
- 2009 (I) (Brazil) Marcelinho Machado (Flamengo Basketball): 24.9
- 2009 (II) (Brazil) Guilherme Giovannoni (Brasilia): 23.7
- 2010 (Brazil) Marcelinho Machado (Flamengo Basketball): 25.6
- 2011 (Brazil) Marcelinho Machado (Flamengo Basketball): 18.8
- 2012 (Brazil) Paulinho Boracini (Pinheiros): 22.3
- 2013 (Uruguay) (Italy) Leandro García Morales (Club Atlético Aguada): 25.9
- 2014 (Brazil) Guilherme Giovannoni (Brasilia): 22
- 2015 (United States) Jeremiah Wood (Club San Martín de Corrientes): 18.5
- 2016 (Uruguay) (Italy) Leandro García Morales (Hebraica Macabi): 23.3
- 2017 (Venezuela) Heissler Guillent (Guaros de Lara): 16.8
- 2018 (Brazil) Marquinhos Vieira (Flamengo Basketball): 22
- 2019 (United States) Samuel Yeager (Piratas de los Lagos ): 26.9
- 2022 (United States) Charles Mitchell (Regatas Corrientes): 18.1
- 2023 (Venezuela) Emilio Cappare Guzmán (Caballeros de Culiacan): 20.7
- 2024 (United States) Derrick Woods (ABA Ancud): 20.5
- 2025 (United States) Davaunta Thomas (Corinthians): 20.7

=== Most rebounds ===
Since the beginning of the 1996 season (rebounds Per Game):

- 2007 (United States) Robert Battle (Libertad de Sunchales): 10.9
- 2008 (Brazil) Shilton dos Santos (Joinville): 8.6
- 2009 (I) (Mexico) Roberto Sebastian Lopez (Regatas de Corrientes): 8.2
- 2009 (II) (Brazil) Murilo Becker (Minas Tênis Clube): 9.8
- 2010 (Brazil) Ricardo Luis Probst (Minas Tênis Clube): 9.8
- 2011 (Argentina) Federico Kammerichs (Regatas): 11.6
- 2012 (Argentina) Juan Pedro Gutiérrez (Obras Sanitarias): 9.3
- 2013 (Brazil) Murilo Becker (Minas Tênis Clube): 10
- 2014 (Brazil) Bruno Fiorotto (Limeira): 9.5
- 2015 (Uruguay) Mathías Calfani (Club Malvín): 8.5
- 2016 (United States) Justin Douglas Williams (Ciclista Olímpico): 13
- 2017 (Venezuela) Néstor Colmenares (Guaros de Lara): 8.8
- 2018 (Argentina) Pablo Espinoza (Instituto Atlético Central Córdoba): 8.6
- 2019 (Argentina) Erik Thomas (Ferro Carril Oeste ): 7.4
- 2022 (Dominican Republic) Eloy Vargas (Club Atlético Aguada): 11.6
- 2023 (Dominican Republic) Eloy Vargas (Titanes de Barranquilla): 11
- 2024 (United States) Derrick Woods (ABA Ancud): 10.8
- 2025 (United States) Elyjah Clark (Corinthians): 7.5

=== Most assists ===
Since the beginning of the 1996 season (assists Per Game):

- 2007 (Brazil) Helio Rubens Garcia Filho (Unitri/Uberlândia ): 5.9
- 2008 (Argentina) Facundo Sucatzky (Minas Tênis Clube): 5.8
- 2009 (I) (Brazil) Valtinho da Silva (Brasilia): 5
- 2009 (II) (Brazil) Valtinho da Silva (Brasilia): 8
- 2010 (Brazil) Nezinho dos Santos (Brasilia): 5.3
- 2011 (Brazil) Nezinho dos Santos (Brasilia): 5.3
- 2012 (Brazil) Nezinho dos Santos (Brasilia): 6.5
- 2013 (Brazil) Nezinho dos Santos (Brasilia): 6
- 2014 (Brazil) Fúlvio de Assis (Brasilia): 7.5
- 2015 (Argentina) Diego Ciorciari (Club San Martín de Corrientes): 5
- 2016 (Argentina) Maximiliano Stanic (Ciclista Olímpico): 8
- 2017 (Argentina) Leandro Vildoza (Estudiantes Concordia): 4
- 2018 (Brazil) Gegê Chaia (Minas Tênis Clube): 7.2
- 2019 (United States) Cordero Bennett (Esporte Clube Pinheiros): 5
- 2022 (Venezuela) (Spain) Jhornan Zamora (Titanes de Barranquilla): 6.3
- 2023 (United States) Joshua Webster (Club Gimnasia & Esgrima Comodoro Rivadavia): 5.6
- 2024 (Argentina) Lucas Perez (San Lorenzo): 8.8
- 2025 (Brazil) Elio Corazza (Corinthians): 6.2

=== Index rating ===
- 2007 (United States) Robert Battle (Libertad de Sunchales): 21.5
- 2008 (Brazil) Marcelinho Machado (Flamengo Basketball): 25.8
- 2009 (I) (Brazil) Marcelinho Machado (Flamengo Basketball): 25.5
- 2009 (II) (Brazil) Murilo Becker (Minas Tênis Clube): 27
- 2010 (Brazil) Marcelinho Machado (Flamengo Basketball): 21.9
- 2011 (Argentina) Federico Kammerichs (Regatas): 24.6
- 2012 (Argentina) Juan Pedro Gutiérrez (Obras): 21.8
- 2013 (Brazil) Alex Garcia (Brasilia): 23.3
- 2014 (Brazil) Guilherme Giovannoni (Brasilia): 24.5
- 2015 (United States) Jeremiah Wood (Club San Martín de Corrientes): 24.3
- 2016 (Uruguay) (Italy) Leandro García Morales (Hebraica Macabi): 22.2

== Awards ==
=== Liga Sudamericana Series Finals Top Scorers ===
The competition was held in a play-off format of at least 2 games, before it shifted to a single final.

Season	Top scorer	Club	Total points Scored	References
1996	(Brazil) Oscar Schmidt	(Brazil) Corinthians	(2 games)	
1997	(Brazil) Oscar Schmidt	(Brazil) Corinthians	(3 games)	
2004	(United States) Josh Pittman	(Argentina) Atenas	88+ (5 games)	
2010	(Brazil) Marcelinho Machado	(Brazil) Flamengo Basketball	28 (1 game)	
2011	(United States) Dartona Washam	(Argentina) Obras Sanitarias	23 (1 game)	
2013	(Uruguay) Leandro García Morales	(Uruguay) Atletico Aguada	29 (1 game)	
2014	(Brazil) Rafael Hettsheimeir	(Brazil) Bauru	18 (1 game)	
2015	(Brazil) Deryk Evandro»	(Brazil) Brasilia	47 (2 games)	
2016	(United States) Shamell Stallworth	(Brazil) Mogi Das Cruzes	60 (3 games)	

== See also ==
- List of basketball champions of the Americas
- South American Women's Basketball League
- Basketball Champions League Americas
- FIBA Americas League
- Pan American Championship
- South American Championship of Champions Clubs

== Sources ==
- Stats leaders on fiba.basketball
- Editions
