= Olimpia Basketball Club =

Olimpia
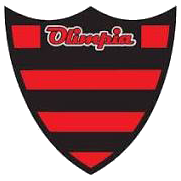
- Founded: August 26, 1940; 84 years ago
- Arena: Estadio Olimpia
- Capacity: 3,150
- Location: Venado Tuerto, Santa Fe, Argentina
- Team colors
- Championships: 1 FIBA South American League; 1 Argentine Championship
Home	Away

Olimpia Basketball Club, commonly known as Olimpia de Venado Tuerto (Spanish pronunciation: [oˈlimpja ðe βeˈnaðo ˈtweɾto], abbreviated Olimpia BBC) is an Argentine professional basketball club, that is based in the city of Venado Tuerto, Santa Fe Province.

== History ==
The club was established on August 26, 1940, in Barrio San Martín of Venado Tuerto. In 1991, the team was promoted to the top-tier level Argentine League (LNB). In the 1994–95 season, Olimpia reached the Argentine League finals, where they were beaten by Club Sportivo Independiente.

Olimpia won its first Argentine LNB title in the 1995–96 season. The roster for that season was: Alejandro Montecchia, Walter Guiñazú, Federico Helale, Jorge Racca, Leonardo Gutiérrez, Lucas Victoriano, Sebastián Uranga, Todd Jadlow, Andrés Rodríguez, Carlos López Jordan, Alejandro Burgos, and Michael Lamont Wilson. The team's head coach was Horacio Seguí, while Jorge Racca was named the Argentine League MVP. That same year, Olimpia also won the FIBA South American League, after defeating the Brazilian Championship team S.C. Corinthians Paulista, in the final. Jorge Racca was also the MVP of that competition. The club also competed at the 1996 edition of the FIBA Intercontinental Cup.

Nevertheless, the club then entered into a crisis, due to financial problems. By 2009, Olimpia had a debt of $1.5 million, and due to that critical situation, the basketball team disaffiliated itself from the top level Argentine League. The club was still in bankruptcy until 2017, when it finally cleared its debts.

== Honours ==
=== Domestic ===
- Liga Nacional

Winners (1): 1995–96
Runners-up (1): 1994–95

=== International ===
- Liga Sudamericana

Winners (1): 1996

- Campeonato Panamericano

Runners-up (1): 1994

- Campeonato Sudamericano

Runners-up (1): 1994

- FIBA Intercontinental Cup

Runners-up (1): 1996

== Notable players ==
Note: Flags indicate national team eligibility at FIBA-sanctioned events. Players may hold other non-FIBA nationalities not displayed.

Criteria

To appear in this section a player must have either:

- Set a club record or won an individual award while at the club
- Played at least one official international match for their national team at any time
- Played at least one official NBA match at any time.

- (Argentina) Héctor Campana (1993–95)
- (Argentina) Carlos Delfino (1998–99)
- (Argentina) Leonardo Gutiérrez (1993–98)
- (Argentina) Wálter Herrmann (1996–2000)
- (Argentina) Alejandro Montecchia (1994–98)
- (Argentina) Andrés Nocioni (1996–97)
- (Argentina) Esteban Pérez (1999–2000)
- (Argentina) Jorge Racca (1994–97, 2007)
- (Argentina) Selem Safar (2005–2006)
- (Argentina) Sebastián Uranga (1994–97, 1998–99)
- (Argentina) Lucas Victoriano (1995–97)
- (United States) Pat Durham (1992–93)
- (United States) Todd Jadlow
- (United States) Levy Middlebrooks (2000)
- (United States) Michael Lamont Wilson

== Head coaches ==
- (Argentina) Horacio Seguí
